= Gilbert (surname) =

Gilbert is a surname. Notable people with the surname include:

== A ==
- Adrian Gilbert (born 1954), British author and military historian
- Alan Gilbert (Australian academic) (1944–2010), Australian, President and BR Vice Chancellor of the University of Manchester
- Alan Gilbert (conductor) (born 1967), American conductor
- Aletha Gilbert (1870-1931), American civic leader
- Alex Gilbert (adoption advocate) (born 1992), New Zealand adoption advocate
- Alfred Gilbert (1854–1934), English sculptor and goldsmith
- Alfred Carlton Gilbert (1884–1961), American inventor, athlete, toy-maker and businessman
- Alvarus E. Gilbert (1825–1891), American farmer and politician
- Amy Gilbert (1895–1980), American historian
- Anthony Gilbert (composer), British composer
- Arthur Gilbert (triathlete) (1921–2015), English triathlon competitor
- Arthur Hill Gilbert (1894–1970), American Impressionist painter
- Arik Gilbert (born 2002), American football player
- Augustin Nicolas Gilbert (1858–1927), French physician and medical researcher

== B ==
- Barrie Gilbert (1937–2020), English-born electronics engineer, inventor of the Gilbert cell
- Bartholomew Gilbert (died 1603), English explorer, sailor, captain
- Benjamin Gilbert (died 1780), Pennsylvania settler captured by Indians
- Billy Gilbert (1894–1971), American comedian and actor
- Billy Gilbert (baseball) (1876–1927), American baseball player
- Billy Gilbert (silent film actor) (1891–1961), American silent-film actor and director
- Brad Gilbert (born 1961), American tennis coach, television tennis commentator, and former professional tennis player
- Brantley Gilbert (born 1985), American country singer, songwriter
- Brenda Gilbert, Canadian film producer
- Bruce Gilbert (born 1946), English musician

== C ==
- C. P. H. Gilbert (1861–1952), American architect
- Cass Gilbert (1859–1934), American architect
- Chad Gilbert (born 1981), American musician and record producer
- Chaleeda Gilbert (born 2001), Thai singer and actress
- Charles Henry Gilbert (1859–1928), American ichthyologist
- Chris Gilbert (disambiguation)

== D ==
- Dana Gilbert (born 1959), American tennis player
- Daniel Gilbert (disambiguation)
- DaRon Gilbert (born 2001), American football player
- David Gilbert (disambiguation)
- Davies Gilbert (1767–1839), British engineer, author, and politician
- Dennis Gilbert (disambiguation)
- Dorothée Gilbert (born 1983), étoile at the Ballet de l'Opéra National de Paris

== E ==
- Ed Gilbert (1931–1999), American actor
- Eddie Gilbert (cricketer) (1905–1978), Queensland Aboriginal cricketer
- Edgar Gilbert (1923–2013), American mathematician and coding theorist
- Edouard-Jean Gilbert (1888–1954), French mycologist
- Edward Joseph Gilbert (1936–2025), American-born Catholic Archbishop of Port of Spain, Trinidad and Tobago
- Edwin Gilbert (1907–1976), German-born American novelist
- Edwin Fisher Gilbert (1929–2020), American swimmer
- Elena Gilbert, fictional character in television series, The Vampire Diaries, portrayed by Nina Dobrev
- Elizabeth Gilbert (born 1969), American author
- Elmer G. Gilbert (1930–2019), control systems engineer
- Ethel S. Gilbert, American biostatistician and expert in the risks of radiation-induced cancer
- Eugène Gilbert (1889–1918), French pilot

== F ==
- Fabiola Cabeza de Baca Gilbert (1894–1991), American educator and author
- Felix Gilbert (1905–1991), German-born American historian

== G ==
- Gale Gilbert (born 1961), American football quarterback
- Garrett Gilbert (born 1991), American football player
- George G. Gilbert (1849–1909), U.S. Representative from Kentucky
- George Gilbert (Jesuit) (1559–1583), English Roman Catholic convert and activist
- Gillian Gilbert (born 1961), English guitarist, keyboardist, and vocalist for New Order
- Glenroy Gilbert (born 1968), Canadian athlete
- Glyn Gilbert (1920–2003), English Major-General in Bermuda
- Goldsmith C. Gilbert, American pioneer and early resident of Muncie, Indiana
- Greg Gilbert (born 1962), Canadian ice hockey player
- Grove Karl Gilbert (1843–1918), American geologist
- Gustave Gilbert (1911–1977), American psychologist

== H ==
- Helen Gilbert (artist) (1922–2012), American artist
- Helen Gilbert (actress) (1915–1995), American actress
- Henry F. Gilbert (1868–1928), American composer
- Herb Gilbert (1888–1972), Australian rugby footballer
- Herb Gilbert, Jr. (1917–1983), Australian rugby league footballer
- Herschel Burke Gilbert (1918–2003), American composer
- Homer Gilbert (1909–1943), American football player
- Humphrey Gilbert (c. 1537–1583), English adventurer

== J ==
- Jack Gilbert (disambiguation)
- James Gilbert (disambiguation)
- Jane Gilbert (actress) (1919–2004), American actress
- Jane Gilbert (educationalist), New Zealand educationalist
- Janice Gilbert (c. 1920 – 1992), American actress and bridge expert
- Jean Gilbert (1879–1942), German operetta composer
- Jessie Gilbert (1987–2006), British chess player
- Joan Gilbert (1906−1991), English broadcaster
- Joanne Gilbert (born 1932), American television and film actress
- John Gilbert (disambiguation)
- Johnny Gilbert (born 1928), American game show announcer
- Jordan Gilbert (born 1990), American professional Counter-Strike player

== K ==
- Kenneth Gilbert (1931–2020), Canadian harpsichordist
- Kenneth Gilbert (actor) (1931–2015), English actor
- Kent Gilbert (born 1952), American actor in Japan
- Kerrea Gilbert (born 1987), English footballer
- Keshon Gilbert (born 2003), American basketball player
- Kieran Gilbert, Australian journalist and television presenter
- Kristen Gilbert (born 1967), American serial killer nurse

== L ==
- Larry Gilbert (disambiguation)
- Lewis Gilbert (1920–2018), British film director
- Logan Gilbert (born 1997), American professional baseball player

== M ==
- Mads Gilbert (born 1947), Norwegian doctor
- Marcus Gilbert (disambiguation)
- Mary Ann Gilbert (c. 1776–1845), English agronomist
- Mat Gilbert (born 1985), English rugby union footballer
- Matt Gilbert (academic) (born 1978), American historian
- Melissa Gilbert (born 1964), American actress
- Mark Gilbert (born 1956), former Baseball player and United States ambassador to New Zealand
- Mark Gilbert (American football) (born 1997), American football player
- Michael Gilbert (disambiguation)

== P ==
- Paul Gilbert (born 1966), American guitarist
- Philippe Gilbert (born 1982), Belgian road bicycle racer
- Peggy Gilbert (1905–2007), American jazz saxophonist and bandleader

== R ==
- Rhod Gilbert (born 1968), Welsh comedian
- Richard Gilbert (disambiguation)
- Robert Gilbert (disambiguation)
- Rod Gilbert (1941–2021), Canadian-American ice hockey player
- Ron Gilbert, American video-game designer
- Ronnie Gilbert (1926–2015), American folk-singer
- Ruby Gilbert (1929–2010), American politician
- Ruby I. Gilbert (1851–1945), American business woman

== S ==
- Sam Gilbert (Australian footballer) (born 1986), Australian rules footballer
- Sandra Gilbert (1936–2024), American professor, literary critic and poet
- Sara Gilbert (born 1975), American actress
- Sean Gilbert (born 1970), American Football player
- Seymour Parker Gilbert (1892–1938), American lawyer, banker, politician and diplomat
- Shannan Gilbert (1986–2010), American murder victim
- Mari Gilbert (1964–2016), American activist and murder victim advocate
- Simon Gilbert (disambiguation)
- Sky Gilbert (born 1952), Canadian writer, actor, academic and drag performer

== T ==
- Tere Gilbert, New Zealand early childhood educator and Māori language advocate
- Thomas Gilbert (disambiguation)
- Tim Gilbert (journalist) (born 1967), Australian journalist
- Timothy Gilbert (1797–1865), American piano manufacturer, abolitionist and religious organizer
- Todd Gilbert (born 1970), American politician from Virginia
- Tyler Gilbert (born 1993), American baseball player

== U ==
- Ulysees Gilbert III (born 1997), American football player

== W ==
- Walter Gilbert (born 1932), American Nobel Prize (biology) recipient
- William Gilbert (disambiguation)
- William Schwenk Gilbert (1836–1911), English dramatist, librettist, poet and illustrator

== Z ==
- Zyon Gilbert (born 1999), American football player

== See also ==
- Gilbert (disambiguation)
