= Graffiti in Iran =

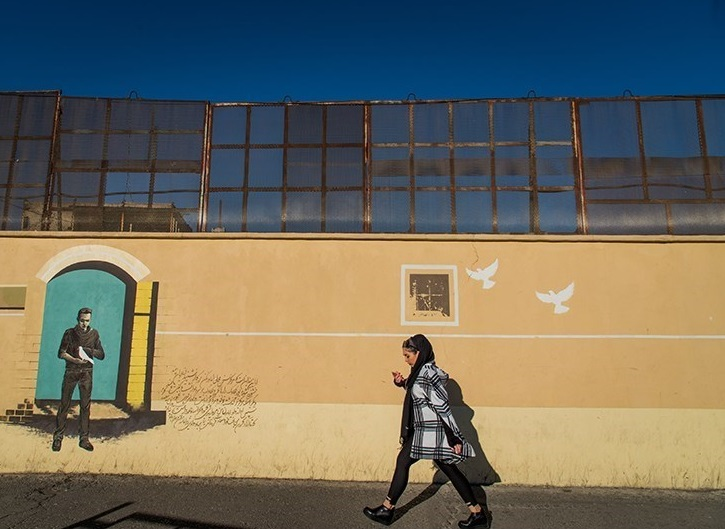
Government-supported graffiti in Tarasht, Tehran.

Graffiti in Iran consists of different styles. Some are slogans painted by governmental organizations, and some are works of art by regular citizens. During the last few years, Tehran Municipality has been drawing graffiti (more properly named "murals") in order to beautify the city. Much governmental graffiti regards the Iranian Revolution, Islamic Republic of Iran policies and The Politics of Resistance. Pro-democracy activists are also continuing a political graffiti campaign in Tehran. Islamic graffiti can also be seen around the city. Graffiti has long served as a medium of expression through Iran's complicated political history.

Since the establishment of the Islamic Republic in 1979, public spaces have become critical elements in the use of public art projects. Walls are used as an expression of societal values, and people have always been in contact with the current strategies of government conveyed through wall paintings and other imagery. The government and the public express themselves by interfering with and occupying the public space. It is a mutual relationship, which reveals the social climate of its region.

== Background ==
Graffiti art is one of the new popular phenomena, especially in terms of its relationships with youth subcultures; youth protest culture and street art in big cities around the world. Graffiti is also a way to express political and cultural opinions of marginalized and excluded groups have no serious access to the official propaganda facilities. Not only is graffiti a way to express their ideas and ideals symbolically, but also it is a way to distinguish their culture (the underground culture) from the official culture. According to some sources, the first graffiti was done by ECNCE in 1995-1996 in the capital city of Tehran.

There is a hidden link between graffiti and other elements of the Iranian youth lifestyle (especially the underground music) in major cities (Tehran, Karaj, Mashhad, and Shiraz). Although one can see political and social criticism in the Iranian graffiti as well, the most striking aspect of it is the social one. There is no serious experience in graffiti in the pre-revolutionary Iran. Stencils and murals with revolutionary themes are the most common forms of graffiti in the post-revolutionary Iran. The Iranian new graffiti creators are young people who do not act in line with the official culture, but sometimes conflict with it and even find fun in such an experience. It is a way of identification for them. According to this view, the Iranian youth take diverse elements from different cultures and integrate them into a new integrated whole. Thus, the present youth culture or subculture is composed of elements borrowed from the West and indigenous elements. This culture, more than anywhere else is visible in the underground culture (music and graffiti). The underground youth cultures, thus, has a critical stance towards the status quo socially, culturally and sometime politically. So, their culture is in accordance with what is called ‘the global youth culture’.

There is no serious research on the social background of the Iranian graffiti creators, thus at the present time one can only suggest some primary hypothesis. Observers believe that there is no clear link between social class and graffiti in Iran.

== Related films ==
=== Writing on the City ===
Writing on the City (2016) is a documentary by Keywan Karimi about Iranian graffiti made in 2015.

- Notable point, Iranian authorities sentenced filmmaker Keywan Karimi to one year in prison and 223 lashes after finding him guilty of "insulting sanctities." The charges stem from his documentary on political graffiti in Iran.

=== Mutiny of Colours ===
Mutiny Of Colours is a feature length documentary co-directed by Paliz Khoshdel and Zeinab Tabrizy and produced by Paliz Khoshdel. Mutiny Of Colours about street art & freedom of expression in Iran. Mutiny Of Colours tells the story of day to day life and especially the art-life of five Iranian street artists in 4 episodes. Documentary is based on showing known Iranian artists' point of view, artworks and Idealism and the fact all the message they want to spread is about peace, love, children and women rights. These Iranian artists are risking their freedom while working on their projects and they are facing a continuous struggle with the police.

=== Tehran Ratz ===
Given that those who display their art on the street for everyone to see have been particularly targeted, it comes as no surprise that the work of Tehran Ratz, a dynamic duo of graffiti artists, has been banned. In this short film, the members of the Tehran Ratz discuss their efforts to use graffiti to challenge the legitimacy of the Iranian regime and to change international assumptions about their country’s people.

== Notable artists ==
=== Icy & Sot ===
Hailing from Tabriz, brothers and stencil artists Icy & Sot started their professional career in 2008, but have been creating work on the streets since 2005. Their graffiti addresses issues of peace, war, love, hate, hope, despair, children, society and Iranian culture. They have held numerous exhibitions worldwide and their unofficial street artworks have appeared in Iran and throughout Europe, South America and the United States. In August 2012, the artists attended one of their exhibitions outside of Iran for the first time. “Made in Iran”, held at the Openhouse Gallery in New York City, featured their new works and site-specific installations. Since then, Icy & Sot have been based in New York City – which provides a better platform for their creative endeavors and greater freedom of movement – leaving behind a rich underground street art scene in Iran.

=== Black Hand ===
Black Hand epitomizes the illegal aspect of mural and graffiti art in Iran. Censorship is harsh and Black Hand is compelled to keep his anonymity, as he explains to The Guardian "I hide my identity for security reasons. Under the Iranian municipality laws, writing on walls or advertising without official permission is a crime." In April 2014, the artist organized an exhibition of his own work that took place in an abandoned house in central Tehran which was under the protection of the Historical Preservation Society for its unique architecture, but which the authorities had decided to demolish anyway. Black Hand is considered Iran’s Banksy by many, and has revealed that he takes inspiration and is heavily influenced by the UK artist’s style and artistic philosophy. Like Banksy, Black Hand engages with social and political issues. His art is provocative but is not meant as protest – rather, as a way to find peace.

An example of his art (shown in gallery), which went viral on social media, is a mural of a woman holding up a bottle of dishwashing liquid as if it were a sports cup. Black Hand painted it after the Iranian government barred women from sports stadiums in June 2014. Two weeks later, the municipal government had painted over it in bright blood red.

=== GhalamDAR ===
GhalamDAR started his career at fifteen, and from 2011 to 2014 he teamed up with the Elf Crew, one of the first graffiti groups to emerge in Iran. He has a distinctive style that sets him apart from the rest of his fellow street art practitioners. Rather than being influenced by the mainstream graffiti styles coming in from the West, he takes inspiration from traditional Iranian art forms such as calligraphy (khattati or khoshnevesi) and miniature painting (negargari). GhalamDAR’s art exemplifies a new direction in Iranian street art, positioning street art within the context of Iranian art history.

The recent urban beautification projects initiated by the Iranian government that sanction some street artists and their works have helped artists like GhalamDAR to feel less threatened by the illegal nature of their practices. Finding locations around the city has become easier and people’s responses to street art are less negative than before. He told AMC: "Sometimes we talk to the residents in a particular area to ask them if we can paint there. I show them my ID and tell them that I’m a university art student. I remember once in a while they would come out to see what I was painting, but after a while they stopped being suspicious of our work and didn’t mind us."

=== Mehdi Ghadyanloo ===
Tehran-based artist and designer Mehdi Ghadyanloo began decorating his native city’s high-rises and office buildings about eight years ago, with monumental surrealist and hyper-realist murals produced by himself and his company, Blue Sky Painters. Ghadyanloo’s graffiti blurs the lines between architecture, art and the urban environment, as well as between reality and fiction. Ghadyanloo currently teaches a course on mural art at Soodeh University in Tehran. His art is sanctioned and supported by Tehran’s municipal government, as he told Young Persian Artists: "...most of my large-scale work is financed by the municipality. Some 8 years ago, the municipality set up a committee to help promote mural art in Tehran. The city is an architectural mishmash with buildings often having only one facade and the other three just left blank and grey. This doesn’t make for a beautiful city but it is a great environment for mural work. I think the municipality really felt the need to bring some cohesion or at least colour to the often confused and smog-smeared architectural face of the city."

== Graffiti in Tehran ==
Waliasr square graffiti, as the biggest graffiti in Tehran, Iran, started its activity in 2012. The approximate length of this graffiti is 47 meters and its width is 18 meters. Among the titles of the examples of the graffiti(s) in Wali-e-asr Square, are:

- "Who was more innocent from these pure children?"
- "Ya-Mansoor-e-Ummat".
- "I sympathize, friend"
- "...killed his child

Etc.

== Gallery ==
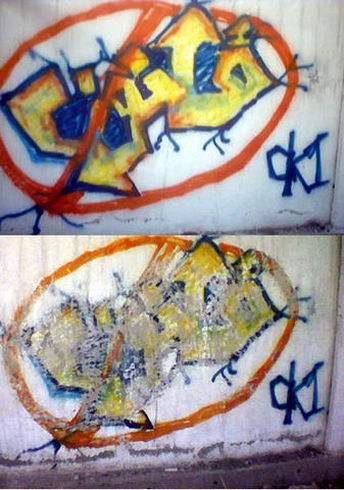
by Keyvan Shovir (Ck1)

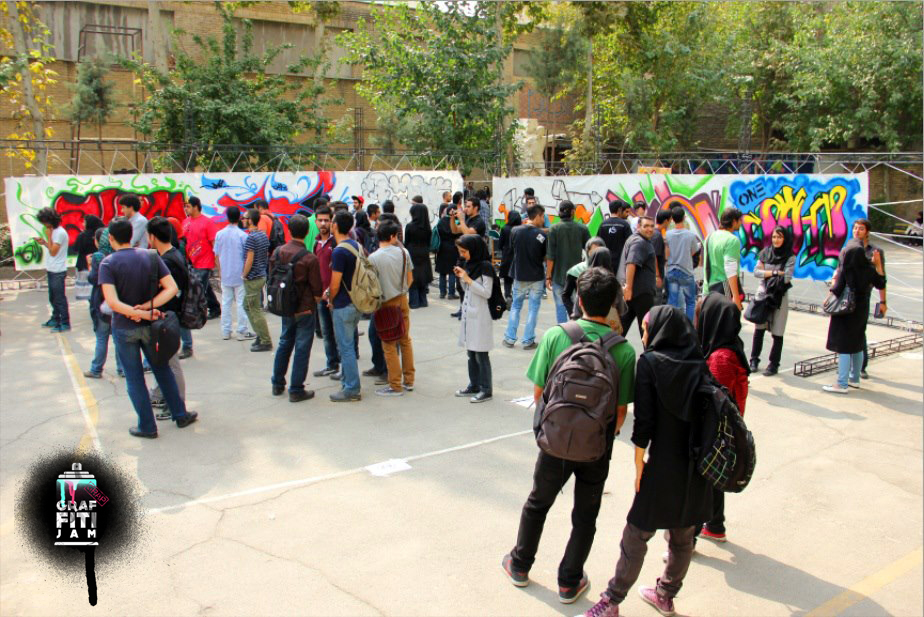
2012 Art university Graffiti Festival

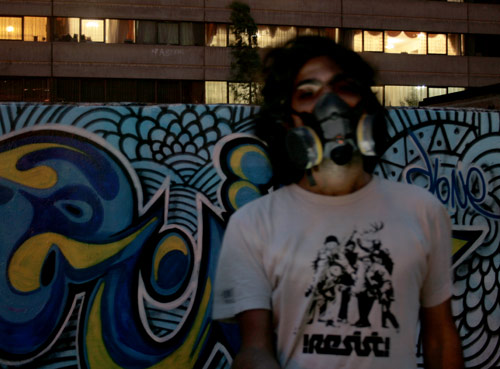
a1one
