= David Gilbert =

David Gilbert may refer to:

== Politics ==
- David Gilbert (activist) (born 1944), American radical leftist organizer and convicted felon
- Dave Gilbert (politician) (1935–2019), politician in Newfoundland, Canada
- Tony Gilbert (activist) (David Gilbert, 1914–1992), British political activist

== Sports ==
- Dave Gilbert (Australian cricketer) (born 1960), former Australian cricketer
- David Gilbert (English cricketer) (1827–?), English cricketer
- Dave Gilbert (footballer) (born 1963), English former footballer
- David Gilbert (snooker player) (born 1981), English snooker player
- Dave Gilbert (snooker player, born 1961) (born 1961), English snooker player

== Other ==
- David Gilbert (artist) (born 1982), American contemporary photographer
- David Gilbert (author) (born 1967), American novelist
- Dave Gilbert (game designer) (born 1976), designer of adventure games
- David M. Gilbert, American biologist
- Dave Gilbert, singer with The Rockets (Detroit band)

== See also ==
- Brian David Gilbert, video producer formerly with Polygon
