= 108 =

108 may refer to:

- 108 (number), the natural number following 107 and preceding 109
- AD 108, a year
- 108 BC, a year
- 108 (artist) (born 1978), Italian street artist
- 108 (band), an American hardcore band
- 108 (emergency telephone number), an emergency telephone number in several states in India
- 108 (Lost)
- Route 108 (MBTA), a bus route in Massachusetts, US
- 108 (New Jersey bus), a bus route in Newark, New Jersey, US
- Peugeot 108, a city car.
- 108 Heroes, the famous set of outlaws from Water Margin
- 108 Hecuba, a main-belt asteroid
- Australia 108, largest building in Australia excluding structures above the roof.

== See also ==
- 10/8 (disambiguation)
- Hassium, a chemical element with atomic number 108
