= National Conference on Crimes Against Children =

Conference in 1993 and 1994 on children's issues

The National Conference on Crimes Against Children held in Washington, D.C., in 1993 and 1994 was noted for its impact on judicial, prosecutorial, educational, and legislative issues. The conference was one of the first bipartisan-supported conferences that involved three presidential administrations and more than three hundred national experts on the sexual exploitation of children, gangs, and trafficking of children.

The 1993 conference's focus was "The Sexual Exploitation of Children: Creating an Investigative and Research Agenda for the 21st Century." The 1994 conference focus was "The Physical and Sexual Exploitation of Children: Evolving Strategies & Challenges to Research, Investigation and Prosecution."

The conference founder and director was Randel (Randy) H. Skinner, a consultant to federal, state, and local law enforcement agencies. Skinner continues his work in this arena in over forty states with a major emphasis in Georgia, California, Mississippi (historic civil rights cases), and Texas.

The conference included noted speakers from the Reagan, Bush, and Clinton administrations, and nationally recognized scholars on child advocacy. The conferences were also instrumental in the advocacy of the Jacob Wetterling Crimes Against Children Sexually Violent Offender Registration Act, which passed in 1994.

== History ==
In 1989, Skinner coordinated a group of fifteen concerned law enforcement agencies from across Georgia, who met to explore the connection between white supremacist groups and the increase in crimes against African American youth. They also explored the increase in aberrant religious belief systems tied to familial homicides and the use of Santeria and Palo Mayombe in drug trafficking cases. This collaborative work developed into an educational component used to train law enforcement agencies nationwide throughout the 1990s.

Skinner—concerned about the amount of violence against children, notably the increase in inner-city gang violence across the nation, increase in trafficking of children, and rise in the sexual exploitation of children—decided to bring together the leading authorities on prosecution, investigation, and public policy to combat crimes against children. This led to the formation of the 1993 and 1994 Conference on Crimes Against Children.

In 1995, the focus turned to crimes against children across Mississippi and California, leading to work in both states with national experts to increase the protection of children. In Mississippi, Skinner traveled over 100,000 miles between 1996 and 1999, expanding his work on historic civil rights cases whose murders were unsolved. Skinner worked with statewide groups on racial reconciliation and restoration, calling for justice in the unsolved cases. By 1999, over twelve civil rights murder cases were solved, with convictions of the murderers.

== Speakers ==
The conference speakers included United States Attorney General Ed Meese and nationally known advocate Miss America Marilyn Van Derber. Some of the noted scholars in the field of child advocacy included Dr. Ann Burgess PhD, Dr. Bruce D. Perry, PH.D, Dr. Robert Kirshner, M.D., Hon. Sol Gothard, and Hon. Kathleen Kearney.

Advocates included Sherry Quirk of Washington, D.C., Dee Jepsen of Enough is Enough, and Susan Hall of Alliance for the Children in Virginia.

Law enforcement experts were Det. William Dworin of Los Angeles, Det. Brian Killacky and Jerry Simandl of Chicago, Florida State Attorney Larry Lawson, U.S. Customs Expert John Sullivan and Lt. Toby Tyler and Al Valdez of California.

Other noted speakers included Hon. Charles B. Schudson, Hon. Gene Malpus, Lloyd deMaus, Brian Fassett, author Jason Berry, Dr. M Sharian Julian, Hon. Rob Showers, Paul Thomson, Dr. Marlene Young, Dr. Jack Enter, Ken Wooden, Hon Joy Watson among many others.

== 1993 Conference topics and speakers ==
- Interviewing and Communication Techniques with the Sexually Abused Child
- The Police Response and Investigation of Child Sex Abuse in Institutions
- Forensic and Legal Implications of Interviewing Sexually Abused Children
- The Response to Political Pressure in Child Sex Abuse Cases
- The Toxic Effects of Investigating Child Sex Abuse Cases
- The Law Enforcement Response to Investigative Reporters
- Expert Testimony Regarding Child Sexual Abuse
- Children in Court: Techniques for Direct Examination/Cross Examination
- Prosecution of Child Sexual Offenders in Institutions (Day Care, etc.)
- The Attorney's Challenge the Findings of Sexual Assault and Evidentiary Exam
- A Psychological Profile of Childhood Histories of Incest and Involvement in Pornography and/or Destructive Cults
- The Recruitment Techniques of Destructive Cults
- Problems of Dissociation, Amnesia and Multiple Personality Disorder in Assessing Survivor Accounts
- Techniques on How the Sexual Perpetrator Breaks down a child's barriers
- Redefining Existing Profiles of the Child Molester
- Management Strategies in Child Sexual Abuse: A Comparison of Law Enforcement, Medical and Child Protective Services
- Selected State Legislation on the Sexual Abuse of Children
- Gang Violence and Its Effects on our Nation's Children
- Profiling Youth Susceptible to Cults, Gangs, and Neo-Nazi Movement
- Targeting Professions which Attract Child Sex Offenders
- Developing Guidelines and Policy for Organizations and Institutions at Risk

== 1994 Conference topics ==
- ″Law Enforcement and Prosecutorial Strategies″
- Introduction to West Coast Gangs and Intervention - Al Valdez, Spec. Invest.
- Profiling Pedophilia Activity: Victim Interviewing Insights – Det. Bill Dworin
- Children in Court: The Task Force Concept for Successful Pros. - Hon. Gene Malpus
- An Approach to Organized Child Abuse - Sgt. Kurt Jackson, Beaumont, Calif PD
- Sting Operation Methods Using Ads and Media – Lt. Toby Tyler, California
- Targeting Professions Which Attract Child Offenders - Panel: Inv. Larry Lawson, Special Agent Don Robinson, Inv. Ronnie Blasingame, Joan Pennington, Hon. Gene Malpus
- Sexual Assault and Evidentiary Exams - Rob Showers, Pres. Of Natl. Law Center
- The Art and Science of Forensic Interviewing Techniques - Panel: Steven Mayo - Forensics, William Dworin, Brian Killacky, Toby Tyler
- Enterprising Investigative Techniques for Successful Prosecutions - Workshop by Ronnie Blasingame
- Making Courts Safe for Children - Hon. Charles Schudson, Wisconsin
- Street Gangs Today - Identification of Midwest Street Gangs - Jerry Simandl, Chicago
- The Investigation of Interpersonal Violence Against Children - Brian Killacky, Chicago
- The Use of Scientific and Psychological Testimony in Court - Hon Kathleen Kearney
- Investigation of Multi-Victim/Multi-Perpetrator Child Abuse Crimes - Larry Lawson
- Case Evaluation Strategies: Turning Difficult Cases - Stephen Mayor, Forensics
- Gangs, A National Epidemic - Al Valdez, Jerry Simandl, Spec. Agent Don Robinson
- Investigators Championing for Children - Toby Tyler, Bill Dworin, Jim Souza
- Concentric Circles: Understanding Child Pornography, Child Prostitution and Ritual
- Abuse Through Case Link Analysis - Jim Souza, M.ED
- Sexual Assault and Evidentiary Exams - Rob Showers, Esq
- Investigation and Prosecution of Child Abuse - Robert Parrish, Asst. Utah Atty. Gen.
- Juvenile Prostitution: The Overlooked Form of Child Sexual Abuse - Sgt. Bryron Fassett
- Panel: The Art and Science of Forensic Interviewing Techniques - Steven Mayo, Forensic Consultant, Sgt. Kurt Jackson, Det. William Dworin, Det. Brian Killacky, Sgt. Toby Tyler.
- ″Medical and Psychiatric Issues″
- Personal Account of Childhood Sexual Abuse - Marlyn Van Derber
- Psychological Profile of Adults with Repressed Childhood Memories - Ann Burgess, Ph.D.
- Neurological Development of Children Raised in Psychologically Destructive Cults - Bruce Perry, Ph.D.
- Understanding Traumatization and Multiple Personality Victims - Jim Freisen, Ph.D.
- Are We Letting People Get Away With Murder? Medical Aspects of Child Abuse - Robert Kirschner, M.D.
- Are the Victims Lying? False Memory, False Science or Falsifying the Truth? Defining and Proving Child Sexual Abuse in Various Courts - Hon. Sol Gothard, J.D. MSW,
- Panel: A Historical, Medical, & Psychological Profile of the Child Abuse Victims - Shari Julian, Ph.D., Ann Burgess Ph.D., and Robert Kirschner, Ph.D.
- The Battle of the Backlash: Myth and Realities in Sexual Abuse of Children - Hon. Sol Gothard, JS, MSW, ACSW Court of Appeals
- False Memory Issues and Mandated Reporting Laws - Sherry Quirk, Esg., Sharri Julian, Ph.D., Hon. Kathleen Kearney, Hon. Sol Gothard and Renee Rich
- Treating the Ritual Abuse Victim - Randy Noblitt, Ph.D.
- Victims of the Female Perpetrator - Sharri Julian, Ph.D.
- Concentric Circles: Understanding Child Pornography, Child Prostitution and Ritual
- Abuse Through Case Link Analysis - Jim Souza, M.ED
- Child Abuse Trends and the Diagnosis - Sue Hawthorn, Mississippi
- Programming: Utilizing Accessing Techniques in the Evaluation & Treatment of Ritual Abuse in Victims - Randy Noblitt, Ph.D.
- Youth Susceptible to Cults: A Profile- Bill Reisman, Consultant Rapha Hospital
- The Use of Scientific and Psychological Testimony in Court - Hon. Kathy Kearney
- Making Courts Safe for Children - Judge Charles Schudson
- Panel: False Memory Issues: Attorney's Challenging the Findings - Hon. Kathy Kearney, Sherry Quirk, Esg.
- Priest Pedophilia Scandals: A Mirror of the Larger Crisis - Jason Berry, Journalist
- ″Child Advocacy and Legislation″
- The Forgotten Child - Joan Pennington, National Center for Protective Parents
- Childhood Sexual Abuse: Legislative Issues and Developments – Sherry Quirk, Esq
- Legislation and Its Impact on Reducing Sexual Violence Against Women and Children – Dee Jepsen
- Wake Up Call – Issues that Threaten the Very Existence of Child Advocates
- The International Exploitation of Children - Paul B. Thompson, VP of World Vision
- Building Effective Advocacy Organizations Influencing State Leg. – Susan Hall
- Targeting Professions Which Attract Child Offenders - Panel: Inv. Larry Lawson, Spec. Agent Don Robinson, Inv. Ronnie Blasingame, Joan Pennington, Gene Malpus
- Strategic Community Assistance to Victims of Physical and Sexual Abuse - Marlene Young Ph.D.
- Developing and Implementing Effective State Legislation - Panel: Rob Parrish, Susan Barker Hall, Sue Hawthorn, Sherry Quirk
- Building a National Communication Network - Panel: Spec. Agent Don Robinson, Robert Parrish, Sgt. Kurt Jackson, Inv. Ronnie Blasingame
- Case Evaluation Strategies: Turning Around Difficult Cases - Stephen Mayo
