= John Gilbert =

John Gilbert may refer to:

== Arts and media ==
- John Gilbert (actor) (1897–1936), American actor of the silent film era
- John Gilbert (broadcaster) (1930–1998), from Canada
- John Gilbert (film editor) (born c. 1960), New Zealand film editor
- Sir John Gilbert (painter) (1817–1897), British artist
- John Gibbs Gilbert (1810–1889), American comedian
- Sir John Thomas Gilbert (1829–1898), Irish archivist, historian, and writer
- Johnny Gilbert (born 1928), American television game show presenter
- John Selwyn Gilbert (born 1943), former British television scriptwriter, director and producer

== Politicians and public servants ==
- John Gilbert (alderman) (1871–1934), chairman of the London County Council
- John Gilbert (Canadian politician) (1921–2006), NDP MP from Ontario
- John Gilbert (MP for Derby), see Derby
- John Gilbert, Baron Gilbert (1927–2013), British Labour Party politician
- John I. Gilbert (1837–1904), New York politician
- John Orman Gilbert (1907–1995), British diplomat, British Resident to Brunei

== Religion ==
- John Gilbert (bishop of St Davids) (died 1397), Bishop of Hereford, 1375–1389
- John Gilbert (archbishop of York) (1693–1761), Archbishop of York

== Scientists ==
- John Gilbert (naturalist) (1812–1845), British naturalist and explorer who worked with John Gould
- John Davies Gilbert (1811–1854), English scientist
- John J. Gilbert (born 1937), American zoologist
- John Wesley Gilbert (1864–1923), African American archaeologist and missionary

== Sports ==
- Brian Gilbert (tennis) (John Brian Gilbert, 1887–1974), British tennis player
- John Gilbert (baseball) (1864–1903), Major League Baseball shortstop
- John Gilbert (cricketer, born 1816) (1816–1887), English cricketer
- John Gilbert (cricketer, born 1910) (1910–1992), English cricketer
- John Gilbert (rugby league), rugby league footballer of the 1970s and 1980s

== Other people ==
- John Gilbert (agent) (1724–1795), land agent and engineer
- John Gilbert (bushranger) (1842–1865), Australian bushranger
- John Henry Gilbert (1901–1974), British philatelist
- John Phil Gilbert (born 1949), U.S. federal judge

== See also ==
- Jack Gilbert (disambiguation)
- John Graham-Gilbert (1794–1866), Scottish portrait painter and art collector
- Jon Gilbert, English bibliophile and historian
- Jonathan Gilbert (born 1967), American actor
