= Sharmin Mojtahedzadeh =

Iranian film director and producer

- شارمین مجتهدزاده
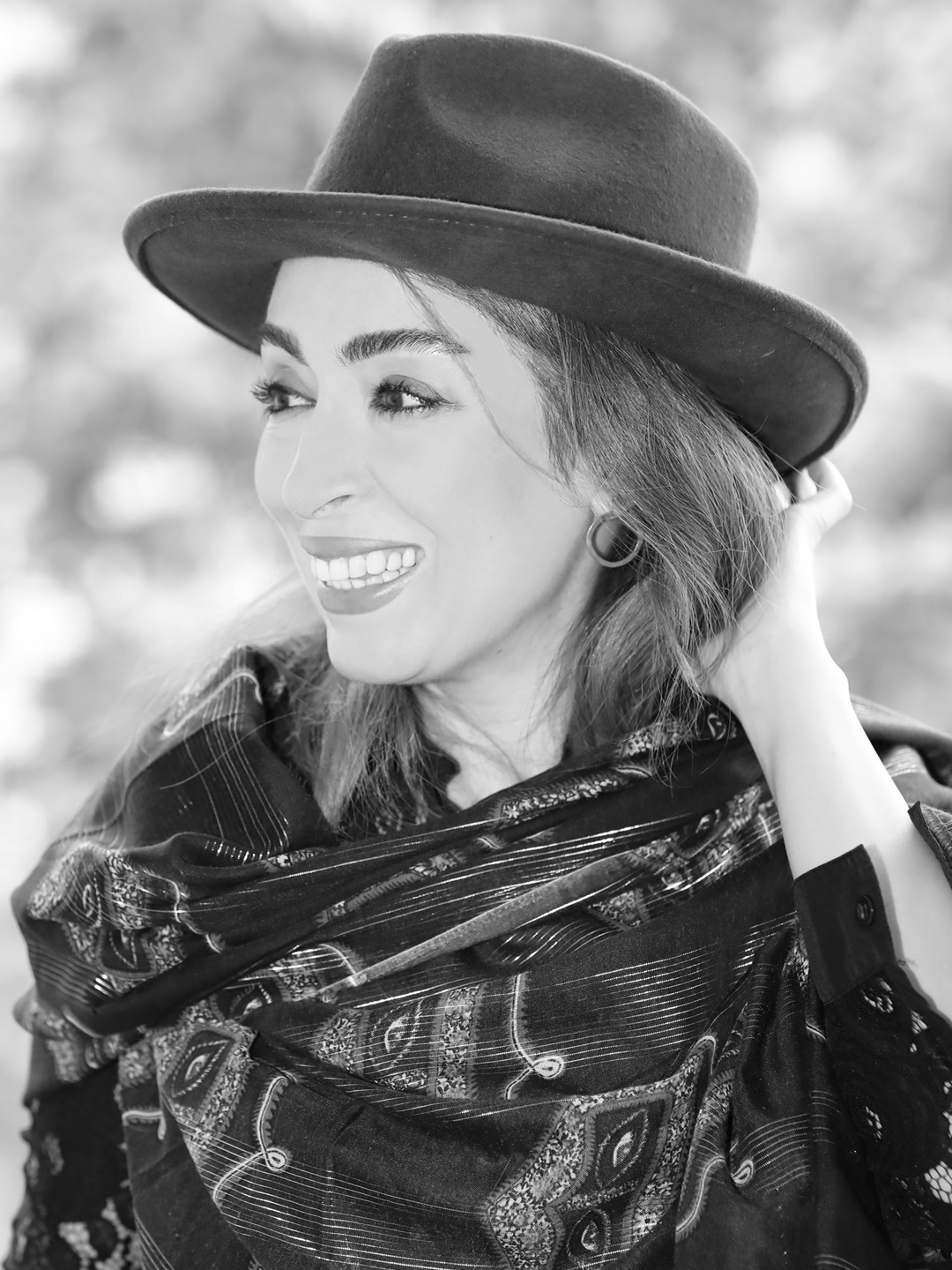
- Born: Tehran, Iran
- Education: MBA in Executive Management BA in Business Management
- Occupations: Film Director, Producer, Photographer
- Movement: Iranian underground filmmaker

Sharmin Mojtahedzadeh (Persian: شرمین مجتهدزاده) (she/her/hers) is an Iranian film director and producer. She was born in Tehran, Iran. She started her career as a filmmaker in 2012. Her body of work focuses mostly on aspects of humanity, human rights and women issues that have rarely been told.

In October 2022, Sharmin Mojtahedzadeh won the best documentary award (Mecenat Award) from Busan International Film Festival (Republic of Korea) for co-directing and co-producing The Football Aficionado long feature documentary film along with Paliz Khoshdel.

Title	Time	Format	Year
Life in War	10 MIN	HD	2013
Life as Gift	17 MIN	HD	2013
Boat Raising Sailes	7 MIN	HD	2016
The Wind Catchers of Tehran	40 min	HD	2017
The Football Aficionado	85 MIN	4k	2022
Centaur	10 min	4K	2025

Filmography

As director

• Life in War (2013)

• Life as Gift (2013)

• Boat Raising Sails (2016)

• The Wind Catchers of Tehran (2017)

• The Football Aficionado (2022)

• Centaur (2025)

As producer

• Life in War (Documentary-Multimedia 2013)

• Life as Gift (Documentary 2013)

• Boat Raising Sails (Experimental 2016)

• The Wind Catchers of Tehran (Documentary 2017)

• The Football Aficionado (Documentary 2022)

National awards

• Won “Best Documentary” Award in Salamat Film Festival 2015

== International awards and screening ==
The Football Aficionado has been awarded as the best Asian documentary film, the Mecenat Award, at 27 Busan International Film Festival (BIFF) in October 2022.

• Official Selection at International Documentary Film Festival Flahertiana,, Perm, Russia 2023

• Official Selection at Action on Film (AOF) Film Festival, California, US, 2016 and 2017

• Official Selection at Feminist Border Arts Film Festival, New Mexico, 2017

• Runner Up at Insight Half Short Film Festival, Kerala, India, 2017

• Film Screening at Kerala International Documentary and Short Film Festival, Kerala, India, 2023

• Film Screening at Cinéma(s) D’Iran 2023

• Film Screening at Iranian Independent Female Filmmakers Festival (IFIF), Switzerland, 2014

• Film Screening at Venice International Experimental Art Festival, Venice, Italy, 2017

• Film Screening at BODYSPACES | HUMANS+HYBRIDSArt Festival, Rome, Italy, 2017
