= Gilbart =

Gilbart is an alternative spelling for Gilbert. It may refer to:

- Andrew Gilbart (1950–2018), judge of the High Court of England and Wales
- James William Gilbart (1794–1863), British, General Manager of the London and Westminster Bank

== See also ==
- Gilbert (disambiguation)
- Gilbert (surname)
