= Mahan Khomamipour =

Documentary Filmmaker

Mahan Khomamipour (born 1992 in Tehran, Iran) is a Documentary Filmmaker, Director of Photography, and a Performer. He started his career in 2011 by directing the half-length documentary "On Underground" about break dancing in Iran, produced by Paliz Khoshdel in 2011.

== Filmography ==
=== As director ===
- “On Underground” 2012, semi-long Documentary Film, (as Director)
- “Better than life” 2014, semi-long Documentary Film, (as Director)
- “A Pair of City” 2017, short video performance (as Director & Producer)
- “Watching the other” 2018, short Documentary Film, (as Director)
- “Simulation of Mr. Yellow” 2018, short Documentary film (as Director & Co-producer)
- The Dream of Invers tree” 2019, Semi long Documentary Film (as Director)
- ASIE” 2020, short animation, (as Director)
- HIPPOSANTE” 2021 Short Documentary (as Director)

== International awards and screening ==
- 'Simulation of Mr. Yellow' wins at Andaras Film Fest
- 'Simulation of Mr. Yellow' wins at Sheffield Short Film Fest.
- The Calgary International Film Festival (CIFF) (Official Selection) for “Simulation of Mr. Yellow
- International Film Festival Shorts (Official Selection) for “Simulation of Mr. Yellow
- 2ANNAS ISFF 2020 (Official Selection) for “Simulation of Mr. Yellow
- Lyon Young Film Festival (Official selection) for “Simulation of Mr. Yellow
- DERBY Film festival 2019 (Official Selection) for “Simulation of Mr. Yellow”
