= Michael Gilbert (disambiguation) =

Michael Gilbert was an English solicitor and crime-fiction author.

Michael Gilbert may also refer to:

- Michael Gilbert (goldsmith) (died 1590), Scottish jeweller and financier
- Michael T. Gilbert, American comic book artist and writer
- Michael William Gilbert, American music composer
- Michael Gilbert, victim of 2009 murder
- Michael Gilbert (artist), American fan artist

== See also ==
- Mike Gilbert, sports agent
- Mike Gilbert (rugby), New Zealand rugby union and rugby league player
