= Jeffrey Gilbert =

Jeff(rey) or Geoffrey Gilbert may refer to:

== Musicians ==
- Geoffrey Gilbert, English flautist
- Jeffrey Gilbert (musician), American musician and a member of Christian rock band Kutless

== Others ==
- Jeffrey Gilbert (judge) (1674–1726), English judge, active in Ireland and England, and writer of legal treatises
- Jeff Gilbert (police officer), police chief of Quartzsite, Arizona, 2004–2013

== See also ==
- Gilbert (surname)
