= Salvatore Macchia =

American classical composer

Salvatore Macchia (born 1947) is an American composer of contemporary classical music.

Macchia studied music composition with Yehudi Wyner and Hall Overton at the Yale School of Music, where he earned a DMA.

In a career spanning 35 years, Macchia has created over 140 works. His catalog contains music in virtually every genre, including fifteen large orchestral works, an oboe concerto, 4 chamber concertos, a cantata and a ballet, as well as four chamber operas. In addition there is a large amount of solo and chamber music comprising six string quartets, a piano quartet, a substantial repertoire of music for diverse small ensembles and an ongoing series of pieces for solo instruments and tape. His works have been performed throughout the United States as well as in Europe, Russia and Japan.

As a contrabassist he has performed in the European and jazz traditions throughout America and Europe and has premiered nearly 100 compositions featuring the contrabass.

He has recorded with, among others, Michael William Gilbert.

A 2006-2007 Samuel Conti Award fellowship winner, Salvatore Macchia is a professor of composition and contrabass at the University of Massachusetts Amherst, where he served as chair of the Department of Music and Dance from 2019 to 2022.
