= Sheida Soleimani =

Iranian American artist

- Born: 1990 (age 35–36); Indianapolis, Indiana, U.S.
- Education: University of Cincinnati, Cranbrook Academy of Art
- Occupations: artist, educator
- Years active: 2015–present
- Known for: fine artist, activist
- Website: sheidasoleimani.com

Sheida Soleimani (born 1990) is an Iranian-American multimedia artist, activist, and professor. Her works have generated conversations in the field of 'constructed' tableau photography, as well as the intersections of art and protest, with a focus on Iranian human-rights violations.

== Early life and education ==
Sheida Soleimani was born in 1990 in Indianapolis, Indiana, and she grew up in Cincinnati, Ohio. Her parents are political refugees who were persecuted by the Iranian government in the early 1980s during the Iranian Revolution. Soleimani has mentioned her personal experience as an Iranian growing up in America, which made her aware of the "stereotypes of Middle Eastern culture by the West" at a young age.

Soleimani received her BFA degree in photography from the University of Cincinnati in 2012. She continued her studies and received a MFA degree in Photography from Cranbrook Academy of Art in 2015.

== Career ==
Soleimani's work highlights the relationships between powerful political people, groups, governments, and corporations, in order to raise questions from the viewer. The themes of her work are topics not often discussed in the West, for example, highlighting the women executed in Iran, and the relationship between power, exploitation and oil, among others. The work is often displayed as a photograph or video of a staged image, Soleimani uses various materials in the work including, soft sculpture "dolls", photography, props, masks, and cut-outs of digital prints.

Her work has gained international recognitions in exhibitions and on publications such as Artforum, The New York Times, The Huffington Post, Interview (magazine), Vice (magazine) etc. Soleimani has presented multiple series of works, namely Medium of Exchange (2018-current), To Oblivion (2016), and National Anthem (2015). Soleimani documented her experience during the COVID-19 pandemic with a series of photographs that were featured in The New York Times in 2021. In 2022, Soleimani participated in the group exhibition "Eyes on Iran" at Franklin D. Roosevelt Four Freedoms State Park, Roosevelt Island, New York; in response to the Mahsa Amini protests. Other artists in the "Eyes on Iran" exhibition included Shirin Neshat, Sepideh Mehraban, Shirin Towfiq, Icy and Sot, and Aphrodite Désirée Navab.

From August 20, 2023, to June 23, 2024, the Museum of Fine Arts, Boston commissioned Soleimani to create a work for their Banner Project that was displayed in their Linde Family Wing for Contemporary Art.

In 2025, Soleimani presented Panjereh, a solo exhibition at the International Center of Photography in New York City, featuring work from the Ghostwriter series. The exhibition was curated by Elisabeth Sherman and on view from June 19, 2025, through September 28, 2025. The Contemporary Arts Center in Cincinnati, Ohio, presented "Sheida Soleimani: What a Revolutionary Must Know," from October 18, 2025, through January 25, 2026. The exhibition brought together all the work from her "Ghostwriter" series, showcasing her work in photography, sculpture, and collage to tell the story of her parents escape from the Iranian Revolution in 1979.

Soleimani is currently an Assistant Professor of Studio Art at Brandeis University. She previously taught at Rhode Island School of Design (RISD).

Soleimani is the founder and executive director of Congress of the Birds, Rhode Island's first avian release and rehabilitation clinic that cares for over 2,000 birds a year.

== See also ==
- David Gilbert (artist)
