= Simulation of Mr. Yellow =

- Directed by: Mahan Khomamipour
- Written by: Mahan Khomamipour
- Produced by: Mahan Khomamipour
- Cinematography: Mahan Khomamipour
- Edited by: Paliz Khoshdel
- Music by: Mohammad mousavi
- Release date: 2019
- Running time: 16 minutes
- Country: Iran
- Language: English

The simulation of Mr. Yellow (Persian: شبیه سازی آقای زرد) is a documentary directed by Mahan Khomamipour. The Simulation of Mr. Yellow is a short documentary about love of an old man in yellow who lives alone in the war-torn city of Aleppo. This film is the fourth collaboration between Mahan Khomamipour and Paliz Khoshdel as an editor.

== Synopsis ==
Simulation of Mr. Yellow is a short experimental documentary about a journalist named Shahrazad, who travels to her motherland, Syria (specifically Aleppo), to make reports for the media. In Aleppo, a city devastated by war, she encounters an old man dressed entirely in yellow. Intrigued by the yellow-clad figure, she desires to report on him, but the man remains silent. Undeterred, Shahrazad begins to search for the true story of this enigmatic figure amidst the whispers of the war-torn city.

== International awards and screening ==
- 'Simulation of Mr. Yellow' wins at Andaras Film Fest
- 'Simulation of Mr. Yellow' wins at Sheffield Short Film Fest.
- The Calgary International Film Festival (CIFF) (Official Selection) for “Simulation of Mr. Yellow
- International Film Festival Shorts (Official Selection) for “Simulation of Mr. Yellow
- 2ANNAS ISFF 2020 (Official Selection) for “Simulation of Mr. Yellow
- Lyon Young Film Festival (Official selection) for “Simulation of Mr. Yellow
- DERBY Film festival 2019 (Official Selection) for “Simulation of Mr. Yellow”

== See also ==
- The Yellow Man of Aleppo
