= Tower 13 =

Condemned building in Paris taken over by graffiti artists

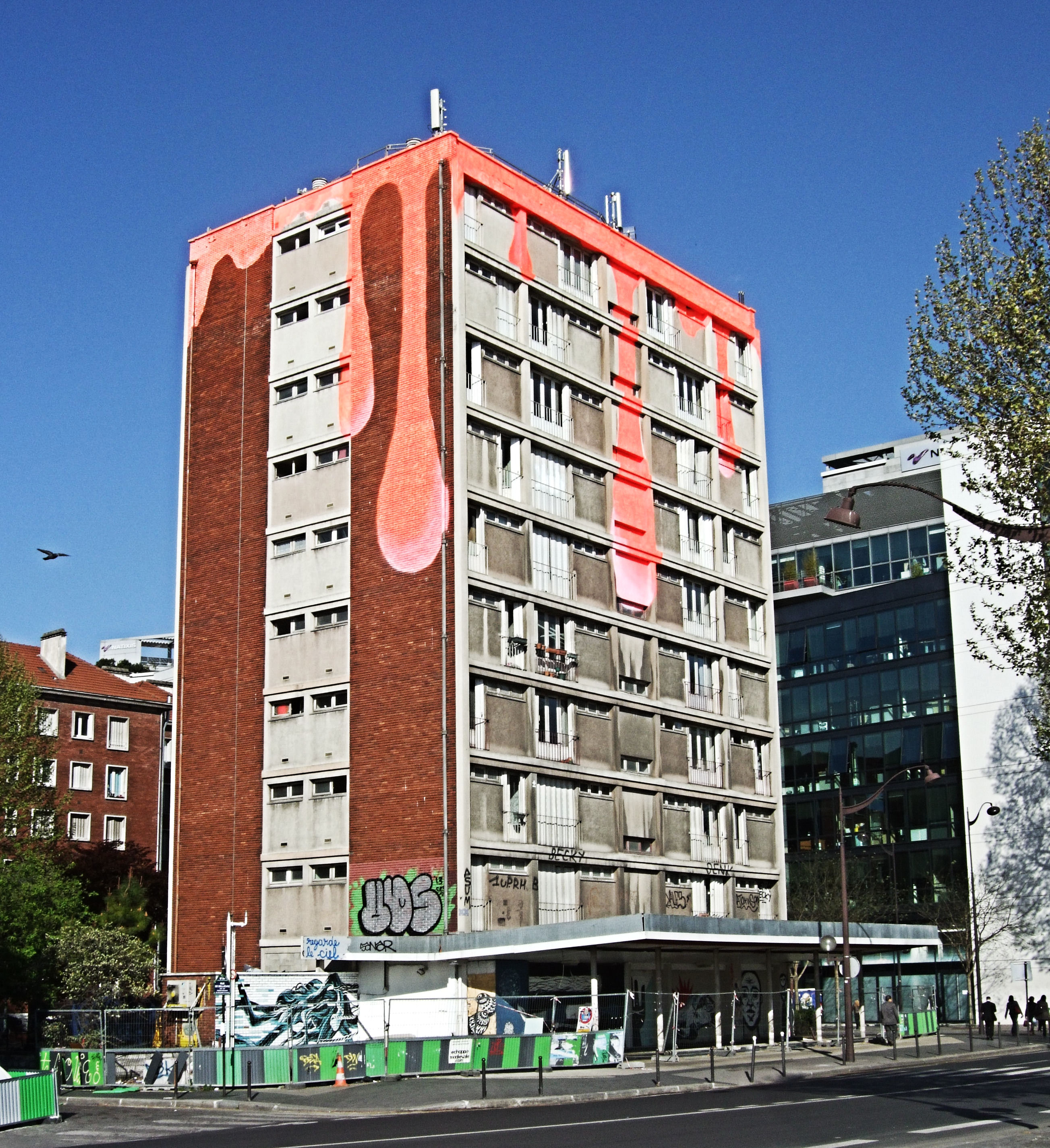
- Interactive map of the Tower 13 area
- Alternative names: Paris Tower 13

General information
- Status: Demolished
- Location: Paris, France, 5 rue Fulton, Paris, Paris, France
- Coordinates: 48.8384°N 2.3719°E
- Construction started: 1950s
- Demolished: 2013

Tower 13 (French: Tour 13), also known as Paris Tower 13 (French: Tour Paris 13) was a building used for an ephemeral street art exhibition in the 13th arrondissement of Paris, France. The conversion of the building into a street art exhibition began in September 2013 and ended on 31 October 2013, after which the building was officially evacuated prior to demolition.

== Use of the building prior to the street art project ==
Built in the 1950s and finished in 1960, Tower 13 was originally a 10-story brick and cement residential building in a low-income housing project. It was scheduled to be demolished in early 2014, as part of a broader urban renewal project. The building was located in Paris' 13th arrondissement on the banks of the Seine.

== Launch of the project ==
Mehdi Ben Cheikh, who learned of Tower 13's planned demolition because he lived in the surrounding neighbourhood of Paris, is a Tunisian-born art teacher and founder of the Galerie Itinerrance.

Recognising the potential of the building as a venue for hosting street artists, he obtained the rights for an art exhibition in the tower as part of a collaboration with Jérôme Coumet, the mayor of the 13th arrondissement of Paris. The plan was to "invite well known urban artists to create a collective open air museum." Cheikh spent six months recruiting 80 street artists from 18 countries to decorate the interior and exterior of the building. This process would ultimately convert the building's entire10 stories into works of art, doomed to destruction.

Cheikh stated that the project had "absolutely no commercial aspect". Offers from art collectors to purchase pieces from the exhibition were rejected because the works were to be displayed as "true art, not decoration for the home or for magazines." Notable artists who worked on Tower 13 include EL Seed, A1one, Guy Denning, C215, 108, and Add Fuel. The artists did not receive financial compensation, and were required to pay for their own travel expenses and materials. Work on the Tower 13 exhibition began in March 2013. At the time, several tenants still refused to leave the building.

Over the course of seven months the artists created more than 4,500 square feet (420 m^{2}) of art and completely painted 36 apartments. The façades and entry areas were also painted.

== The exhibition ==
The exhibition was opened to the public for the month of October 2013. Admission was free, and only 49 visitors were allowed inside the building at once due to safety concerns. Because of this constraint, waiting times were routinely upwards of several hours and could extend to the entire day. Many visitors started queuing in the early hours of the morning. The role of social media in creating this exceptional exhibition makes Tour 13 a case study in how such media can amplify social phenomena.

The exhibit attracted 30,000 visitors during its one-month duration.

== Demolition ==
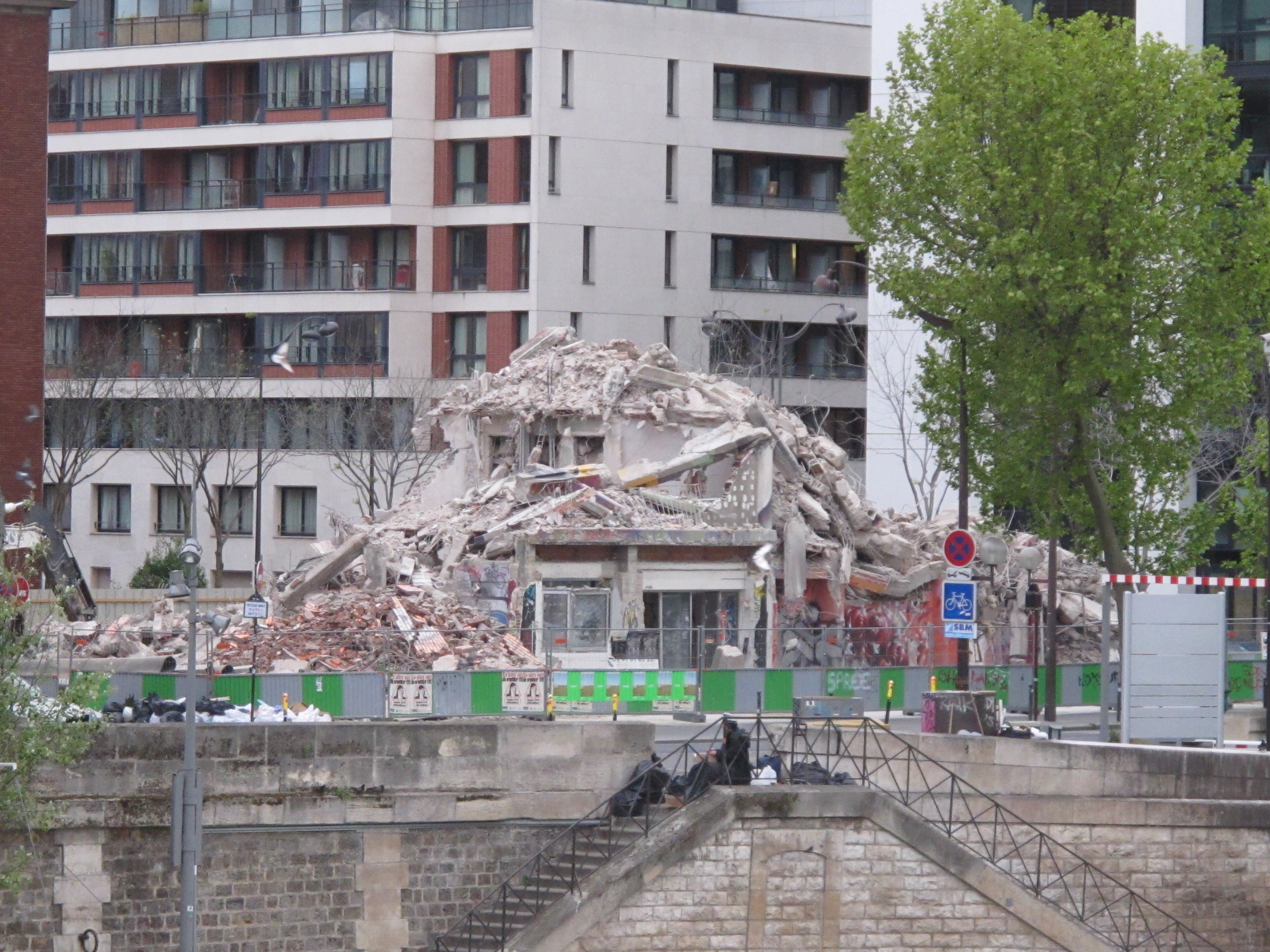
The building and art work, demolished

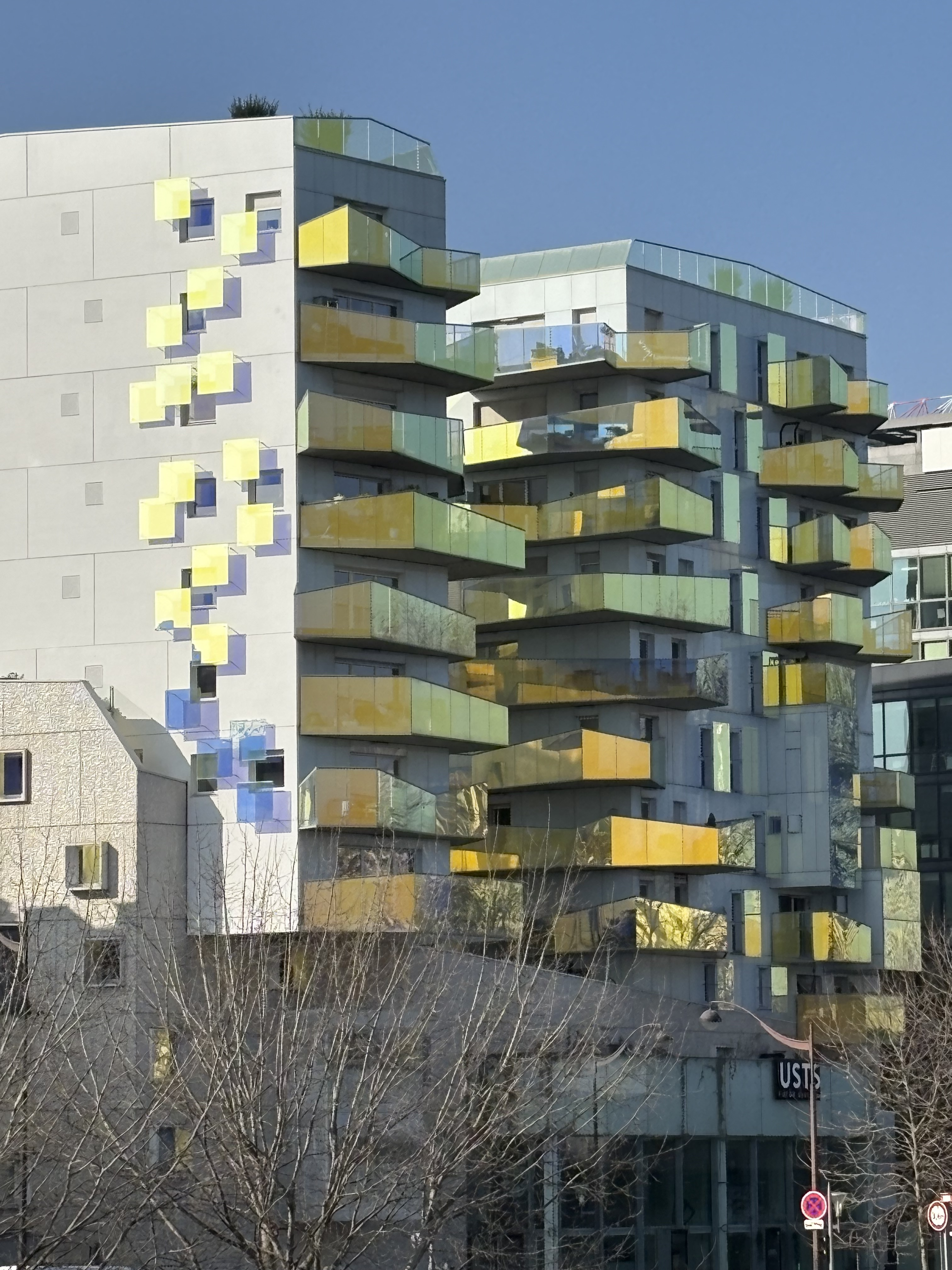
Building that replaced the Tower 13

After the exhibit closed on 31 October 2013, the demolition process began. All of the artwork in the building was destroyed in this process, though purchase offers had been made. The demolition used the technique of grignotage, which involves the deployment of specialised machinery to bring down the building slowly, without recourse to explosives.

== Legacy ==
Before the demolition, artworks at Tower 13 were documented in social media (e.g. on Instagram at #tourparis13) and web formats. Tower 13 was the subject of a 2014 documentary film showcasing the artwork and artists. Mehdi Ben Cheikh wrote two books documenting the experience (see Bibliography below).

== See also ==
- Oceanwide Plaza
- 5 Pointz
- Street art

== Annexes ==
=== Bibliography ===
- Mehdi Ben Cheikh, Tour paris 13, l'evenement Street Art Éditions Albin Michel, 2014, 256 p. ISBN 9782226259035
- Mehdi Ben Cheikh, Boulevard Paris 13: Le musée de street art à ciel ouvert Éditions Albin Michel, 2020, 95 p. ISBN 978-2226446749

=== External links ===
- Media related to Tour Paris 13 at Wikimedia Commons
