= Jack Gilbert (disambiguation) =

Jack Gilbert (1925–2012) was an American poet.

Jack Gilbert may also refer to:

- Jack Gilbert (baseball) (1875–1941), American baseball player
- Jack Gilbert (footballer) (1875–1973), Australian rules footballer
- Jack Gilbert (rugby league), Australian rugby league footballer

== See also ==
- Jack Gilbert Graham (1932–1957), mass-murderer
- John Gilbert (disambiguation)
