= The Yellow Man of Aleppo =

Syrian man known for wearing only yellow since 1983

Abu Zakkour (Arabic: أبو زكور), widely known as The Yellow Man (Arabic: الرجل الأصفر), is a resident of Aleppo, Syria, known for wearing exclusively yellow clothing and accessories since 1983. His unique commitment to the color has made him a local icon and part of the city's cultural image.

== Early life and personal background ==
Abu Zakkour was born around 1953 and currently resides in the Maari neighborhood of Aleppo. A widower and father of three who live outside the country, he lives alone in a small apartment, which is also predominantly yellow in color. Despite his popularity, Abu Zakkour prefers to keep certain details of his personal life private, including his real name.

== Yellow attire and lifestyle ==
Abu Zakkour’s commitment to yellow began in 1983, a date he described as the start of his "yellow journey". He says he views the color as a symbol of love and uniqueness. Since then, he has worn only yellow garments, including suits, shirts, ties, underwear, socks, shoes, and glasses. Even his accessories, such as his mobile phone cover and suitcase, are yellow. Items that are not available in yellow are painted using yellow nail polish to maintain his monochromatic style.

His apartment reflects his commitment to the color, featuring yellow bed sheets, a yellow tablecloth, yellow furniture, and even a yellow trashcan.

== Public recognition ==
Abu Zakkour has become a beloved figure in Aleppo, often attracting attention in public spaces such as the Saadallah al-Jabiri Square.

In recognition of his unique persona, a restaurant owner in Aleppo has erected a statue of Abu Zakkour, dubbing him "The Trump of Aleppo", referencing the U.S. president's hair color. The statue stands alongside portraits of other Aleppo icons, such as the famous singer Sabah Fakhri and the citadel of Aleppo.

== During the Syrian Civil War ==
During the 2012–2016 battle of Aleppo, when parts of the city were under rebel control, Abu Zakkour was detained by fighters who accused him of collaborating with government forces. A video circulated online reportedly showing him being interrogated and harassed by rebels. Despite this ordeal, Abu Zakkour refused to abandon his yellow clothing.

== Legacy and aspirations ==
Abu Zakkour says he considers his dedication to wearing yellow a lifelong mission, vowing never to wear another color. He has expressed interest in being recognized by the Guinness World Records for his decades-long commitment to his monochromatic lifestyle. Locals and media often refer to him as part of Aleppo’s cultural and historical identity.

He said that the reason he only wears yellow will be revealed only after his death, as it is detailed in his will.

== See also ==
- Simulation of Mr. Yellow, a 2019 documentary
- List of people from Aleppo
- Elizabeth Eaton Rosenthal, known as the "Green Lady of Brooklyn"
