= Mark Gilbert (disambiguation) =

Mark Gilbert (born 1956), is an American baseball player and ambassador.

Mark Gilbert may also refer to:

- Mark Gilbert (American football) (born 1997), American football player
- Mark Gilbert (editor-in-chief) of Jazz Journal

== See also ==
- Marcus Gilbert (disambiguation)
