= The Football Aficionado =

- Directed by: Sharmin mojtahedzadeh and Paliz khoshdel
- Written by: Paliz khoshdel and Sharmin mojtahedzadeh
- Produced by: Paliz khoshdel and Sharmin mojtahedzadeh
- Starring: Zahra khoshnavaz
- Cinematography: Paliz Khoshdel and Sharmin mojtahedzadeh
- Edited by: Paliz Khoshdel
- Music by: Mohammad mousavi
- Release date: 2022
- Running time: 86 minutes
- Country: Iran
- Languages: Persian; English

The Football Aficionado is a long-feature social documentary film co-directed by Sharmin Mojtahedzadeh and Paliz Khoshdel and co-produced by Paliz Khoshdel and Sharmin Mojtahedzadeh. The subject of the film targets gender discrimination and women's rights in Iran.

== Story ==
The film's story is about Zahra, a 27-year-old Iranian girl living in Tehran and a big fan of Persepolis, one of the capital’s biggest football teams. She has always wished to watch her favorite team as well as the Iranian national team’s games at the stadium. However, according to an unwritten law, women are not allowed to go to stadiums and watch football games. For this reason, Zahra decides to disguise herself as a man to be able to enter the stadium without foreseeing that her action would go viral across social media and be covered by the popular press, giving the example to other women and starting a movement against this discrimination.

== International awards and screening ==
- The film has been awarded the best Asian documentary, the Mecenat Award, at 27 Busan International Film Festival (BIFF) in October 2022
- Official Selection at International Documentary Film Festival Flahertiana,, Perm, Russia 2023
- Film Screening at Kerala International Documentary and Short Film Festival, Kerala, India, 2023
- Film Screening at Cinéma(s) D’Iran 2023
