= James Gilbert =

James Gilbert may refer to:

- James Gilbert (footballer), Scottish footballer
- James Gilbert (producer) (1923–2016), British television producer and director
- James Daniel Gilbert (1864–1941), British Liberal politician, banker and City merchant
- James Isham Gilbert (1823–1884), Union general in the American Civil War
- James Freeman Gilbert (1931–2014), American geophysicist
- James H. Gilbert (born 1947), Justice of the Minnesota Supreme Court
