= Familial homicide =

Form of crime recognised in England and Wales

Familial homicide is a form of homicide recognised in England and Wales by the Domestic Violence, Crime and Victims Act 2004 and carries a prison sentence of up to 14 years.

The Act closes a legal loophole that allows those jointly accused of the murder of a child or vulnerable adult to avoid prosecution by remaining silent or blaming each other; it puts a clear legal responsibility on adults who have frequent contact with a child or vulnerable adult to take reasonable steps of protection if they knew or should have known the child or vulnerable adult was at significant risk of serious physical harm from members of that household.

== Cases and convictions ==
On Friday, 15 December 2006, Rebecca Lewis was sentenced to six years imprisonment for failing to prevent the murder of her 13-month-old son by her boyfriend in Wales.

A number of people were charged with this offence in connection with the discovery of a headless and dismembered body (which later proved to be that of Michael Gilbert ) in the Blue Lagoon, Arlesey, Bedfordshire, an English beauty spot. On 23 April 2010 James Watt, his girlfriend Natasha Oldfield, and his brother's girlfriend Nichola Roberts were convicted of murder whilst James's brothers Richard Watt and Robert Watt and his mother Jennifer Smith-Dennis were convicted of the familial homicide of Michael Gilbert.
