= Tere Gilbert =

New Zealand early childhood and Māori language educator

Tere Gilbert ONZM
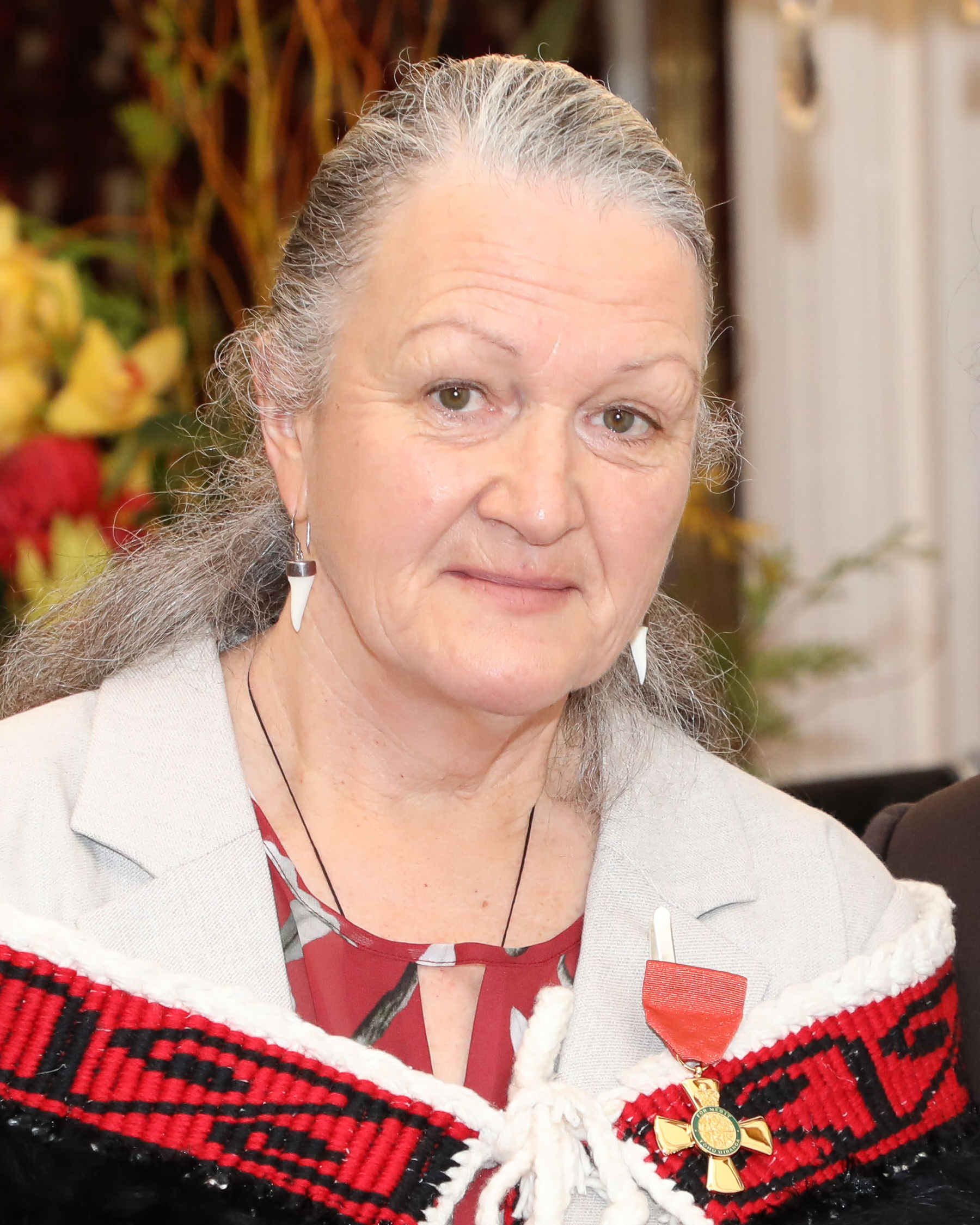
- Gilbert in 2024
- Awards: Officer of the New Zealand Order of Merit

Academic background
- Education: University of Waikato

Tere Ngawai Gilbert ONZM is a New Zealand early childhood educator and advocate for the te reo Māori language. In 2024 Gilbert was appointed an Officer of the New Zealand Order of Merit for services to early childhood and Māori language education.

== Early life and education ==
Gilbert is Māori, and affiliates to Te Āti Awa, Ngāti Hauiti, Ngāti Raukawa and Ngāti Kahungunu iwi. Gilbert attended the University of Waikato where she earned a Bachelor and a higher diploma of teaching, a postgraduate diploma in education, and a Master of Business Administration.

== Career ==
Gilbert has been a part of the Māori language revival movement, Kōhanga Reo, for more than thirty years. Gilbert was the kaiako (teacher) and tumuaki (manager) of the University of Waikato on-campus early childhood education centre from 1994 until 2015. In 2015 she established the first puna reo for Te Kōhao Health in Hamilton, providing kaupapa Māori immersion education for children up to the age of six, that is, education both in the te reo Māori language and within a Māori cultural framework. That puna reo, Te Kōhao Health, was so popular that a second, Te Puna Reo o Te Kōhao, was established two years later.

Gilbert founded the collective for puna reo in New Zealand, Ngā Puna Reo o Aotearoa, and chaired it since its inception in 2021. The organisation represents 54 puna reo around the country, and advocates for better resourcing for puna reo and pay parity with kindergarten teachers. Gilbert represents Ngā Puna Reo o Aotearoa on the Ministry of Education's Early Childhood Advisory Committee.

== Honours and awards ==
In the 2024 Queen's Birthday Honours Gilbert was appointed an Officer of the New Zealand Order of Merit for services to early childhood and Māori language education.
