= Simon Gilbert =

Simon Gilbert may refer to:

- Simon Gilbert (journalist) (born 1984), English journalist
- Simon Gilbert (musician) (born 1965), English drummer
- Simon Gilbert (tenor) (born before 1967), English actor and tenor
