= Thomas Gilbert =

Thomas Gilbert may refer to:

- Thomas Gilbert (architect) (1706–1776), British architect
- Thomas Gilbert (military officer) (1715–1797), American Revolution figure
- Thomas Gilbert (engineer) (1927–1995), American engineer
- Thomas Gilbert (pioneer) (1786–1873), South Australian pioneer
- Thomas Gilbert (politician) (1720–1798), British politician
- Thomas Gilbert (sea captain), who spotted the islands of Gilbert and Ellice Islands, now in Kiribati, which are named after him
- Thomas Gilbert (minister) (1613–1694), English ejected minister
- Thomas Gilbert (clergyman), Church of England clergyman and college principal
- Thomas Drummond Gilbert, Royal Navy officer
- Tom Gilbert (ice hockey) (born 1983), American ice hockey player
- Tom Gilbert (politician) (1926–2016), Canadian politician
- Tom Gilbert (rugby league) (born 2000), Australian rugby league player
- Eddie Gilbert (wrestler) (Thomas Edward Gilbert, Jr., 1961–1995), American professional wrestler and booker
- Marcus Thomas Pius Gilbert (born 1977), also known as Tom Gilbert, British evolutionary biologist
- Thomas Gilbert (gangster), member of the Peaky Blinders street gang
