= James Gilbert (footballer) =

Scottish footballer

Personal information
- Full name: James Gilbert
- Place of birth: Scotland
- Position: Centre forward

Senior career*
Years	Team	Apps	(Gls)
1916–1919	Heart of Midlothian	4	(3)
- * Club domestic league appearances and goals

James Gilbert was a Scottish professional footballer who played in the Scottish League for Heart of Midlothian as a centre forward.

== Personal life ==
Gilbert served as a bombardier in the 1/1st Lowland Heavy Battery of the Royal Garrison Artillery during the First World War.

== Career statistics ==
Appearances and goals by club, season and competition
Club	Season	League			National Cup		Total	
Club	Season	Division	Apps	Goals	Apps	Goals	Apps	Goals
Heart of Midlothian	1916–17	Scottish First Division	4	3	—		4	3
Career total			4	3	0	0	4	3
