= Larry Gilbert (disambiguation) =

Larry or Lawrence Gilbert may refer to:

- Larry Gilbert (1942–1998), American professional golfer
- Larry Gilbert (baseball), (1891–1965), American baseball outfielder
- Larry Gilbert, one of the two men executed for the 1977 murder of Ralph Stoudemire
- Lawrence Gilbert, character played by Josh Hamilton (actor)
- Lawrence E. Gilbert (born 1942), American botanist and entomologist
- Larry Gilbertz (1929–2011), American politician
