= William Gilbert =

William Gilbert may refer to:

== Arts ==
- William Gilbert (author) (1804–1890), English novelist and surgeon (father of W. S. Gilbert)
- W. S. Gilbert (1836–1911), British dramatist who was part of the comic opera team of Gilbert and Sullivan
- Billy Gilbert (silent film actor) or William V. Campbell (1891–1961), American silent film actor
- Billy Gilbert (1894–1971), American comedian born William Barron
- Willie Gilbert (1916–1980), American author and playwright

== Politicians ==
- William Gilbert (MP for Derby) (fl. 1530), Member of Parliament (MP) for Derby
- William Gilbert (politician) (1829–1919), South Australian parliamentarian and philanthropist
- William A. Gilbert (1815–1875), American politician

== Sports ==
- William Gilbert (cricketer) (1856–1918), English cricketer
- Bill Gilbert (baseball) (1868–1927), American baseball player
- Billy Gilbert (baseball) (1876–1927), Major League Baseball second baseman
- Willy Gilbert (1881–1956), Norwegian sailor
- Billy Gilbert (footballer) (born 1959), English former footballer
- Bill Gilbert (speedway rider), English speedway rider

== Others ==
- William Gilbert (physicist) (1544?–1603), English physicist, physician and natural philosopher
- William W. Gilbert (c. 1746–1832), American silversmith
- William Gilbert (rugby) (1799–1877), British cobbler & rugby-ball maker
- William Ball Gilbert (1847–1931), American judge
- William Gilbert (pastoralist) (1850–1923), South Australian pastoralist and vigneron
- Bill Gilbert (intelligence service director) (1916–1987), New Zealand military leader and intelligence service director
