= David Gilbert (English cricketer) =

English cricketer

Personal information
- Full name: David Gilbert
- Born: 15 June 1827; Rotherfield, Sussex, England
- Batting: Unknown
- Bowling: Unknown

Domestic team information
- Years: Team
- 1851–1857: Sussex

Career statistics
Competition	First-class
Matches	7
Runs scored	33
Batting average	3.00
100s/50s	–/–
Top score	8
Balls bowled	225
Wickets	7
Bowling average	13.87
5 wickets in innings	–
10 wickets in match	–
Best bowling	3/18
Catches/stumpings	2/–
- Source: Cricinfo, 17 December 2011

David Gilbert (15 June 1827 – date of death unknown) was an English cricketer. Gilbert's batting and bowling styles are unknown. He was born at Rotherfield, Sussex.

Gilbert made his first-class debut for Sussex against Kent in 1851. He made five further first-class appearances for Sussex, the last of which came against the Marylebone Cricket Club in 1857. In his six first-class matches for the county, he took 4 wickets at an average of 22.50, with best figures of 3/18. With the bat, he scored 28 runs at an average of 3.11, with a high score of 8.

He also made a single first-class appearance for a combined Kent and Sussex team against an All England XI in 1853. He took figures of 3/18 from nine overs in the All England Eleven's first-innings, while in their second-innings he took 1/3 from four overs. The match ended in a draw.
