= Dennis Gilbert =

Dennis Gilbert may refer to:

- Dennis Gilbert (baseball) (born 1947), baseball player, agent, and executive
- Dennis Gilbert (sociologist) (born 1943), professor and chair of sociology at Hamilton College in Clinton, New York
- Dennis Gilbert (ice hockey) (born 1996), American ice hockey player
