= Marcus Gilbert =

Marcus Gilbert may refer to:

- Marcus Gilbert (actor) (1958–2026), British actor
- Marcus Gilbert (American football) (born 1988), American football player
- Marcus Gilbert (basketball) (born 1993), American basketball player

== See also ==
- Mark Gilbert (disambiguation)
