= Chris Gilbert =

Chris or Christopher Gilbert may refer to:

- Chris Gilbert (cricketer) (born 1984), English cricketer
- Chris Gilbert (American football) (1946–2026), American football player
- Chris Payne Gilbert (born 1972), American actor
- Christopher Gilbert (1949–2007), American poet
- Christopher Gallard Gilbert (1936–1998), British furniture historian and museum curator
