= Jack Gilbert (footballer) =

Australian rules footballer

Personal information
- Full name: John Walter Gilbert
- Born: 25 March 1875; Fitzroy, Victoria
- Died: 4 January 1973 (aged 97); Glen Iris, Victoria
- Original team: Fitzroy Crescent

Playing career^{1}
Years	Club	Games (Goals)
1899–1900	Carlton	9 (3)
- ^{1} Playing statistics correct to the end of 1900.

John Walter Gilbert (25 March 1875 – 4 January 1973) was an Australian rules footballer who played with Carlton in the Victorian Football League (VFL).

Gilbert was born in Fitzroy with the name John Walter Giblett but used the surname Gilbert for all his adult life.
