= Islamic graffiti =

Graffiti in Muslim societies

Islamic graffiti is a genre of graffiti created by people who usually relate to the Middle East or North Africa, using Arabic or other languages for social or political messages. It is a popular art genre created by "artists, graffiti writers, designers and typographers from the Middle East and around the world who merge Arabic calligraphy with the art of graffiti writing, street art and urban culture."

Containing social themes, this type of art finds expression in a variety of forms. The most common languages used are English and Arabic. Like all other forms of art, graffiti can serve as a medium for instigating political or social change, or as a form of self-expression.

== Sociopolitical ==
=== Sticker art ===
Sticker art refers to the practice of posting images or phrases to convey a message. A collaborative project called "INSIDE OUT: Artocracy in Tunisia" uses sticker art to promote the spirit of democracy in post-revolutionary Tunisia. Prior to the revolution, only presidential photography could be found in the public space. A group of six photographers, along with a French graffiti artist called JR, replaced these pictures with black and white photographs of anonymous Tunisian people. Their goal is to inspire the people of Tunisia to see themselves in a new light. One of the photographers states: "If people want to tear them down, or write something on them, that's part of the project, that's okay."

=== Subvertising ===
Subvertising refers to the practice of making spoofs or parodies of political advertisements. Princess Hijab, an anonymous street artist from Paris, paints Muslim veils on advertisements in the subway. She refers to this as "hijabisation." Since the enforcement of the "burqa ban," in which women are prohibited from wearing the burqa in public places, her art has sparked feminist and fundamentalist questions. It is not known if Princess Hijab is a Muslim or even a woman. "The real identity behind Princess Hijab is of no importance," she has been quoted. Inspired by Naomi Klein's No Logo, she drew her first veil in 2006 on the French rapper Diam's, who subsequently happened to convert to Islam and now wears a veil. Graffiti on the subways in Paris is considered vandalism. Consequently, Princess Hijab has become highly selective and only paints four to five advertisements a year. She chooses to combine veils with advertisements because they are both "dogmas that can be questioned."

Celik is renowned for her broad range of work on the built environments of the contemporary Mediterranean. She focuses on Ottoman and North African growing cities and architecture. The Giorgio Levi della Vida prize for difference in Islamic studies, created in 1967 by Center founder Gustave E. Grunebaum to honor the life and work of that Italian Jewish scholar, was given to Celik in 2019 by UCLA's Center for Near Eastern Studies.

=== Spray paint ===
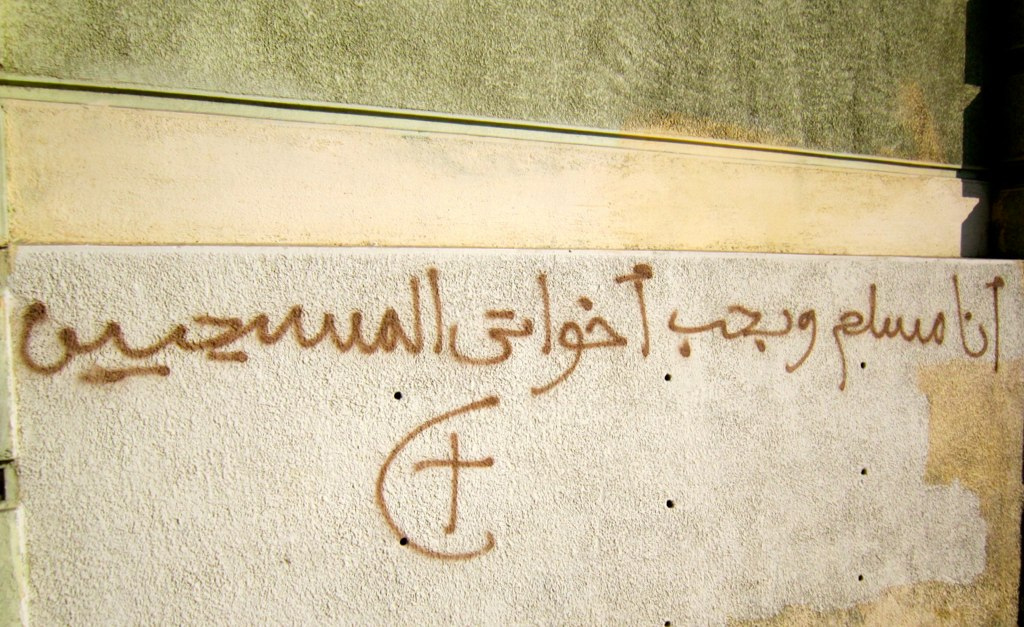
Mural in Cairo reads "I am Muslim and I love my Christian siblings."

Graffiti as a form of communication in Palestine began in 1987 during the first Intifada. This was a period in which there were no Palestinian TV or Radio stations in the Gaza Strip. Murals commemorated martyrs as well as called protestors to action. Israeli military would force Palestinians to wash off graffiti from their homes. If graffiti artists are caught in the act of putting graffiti in public areas, they face jail time and the owner of the place will have to pay a fine.The Dome of the Rock was common among murals in Palestine. In 2006, Hamas took over the graffiti scene. Hamas would encourage people to perform the first of the day's five prayers through street art. Currently, the West Bank wall is covered in graffiti. Numerous messages can be found including marriage proposals, notes to friends, and jokes. Also common are messages of peace. One reads: "Mirror, mirror on the wall. When will this senseless object fall?" "Trying to imagine a clear view between Palestine and Israel," is another. Messages such as these splatter across the wall, and some graffiti artists will paint your message for a fee.

== Notable graffiti artists ==
=== Middle East ===
From Lebanon, Yazan Halwani has developed his form of graffiti based on Arabic calligraphy, figures and culture. His style mixes portraiture and Arabic calligraphy on large walls in Beirut. Halwani thinks that graffiti in the Arab world and Beirut should not evolve into a form of vandalism and therefore he says that his murals try to adapt to their environment and not against it.

From Tehran, a graffiti artist by the name "A1one (a.k.a. Tanha)" has been credited with starting the modern street art movement in Tehran and Middle East. He started his career as an artist in the late 1990s with indoor painting. Now he is an international artist, known for his innovative Arabic and Persian calligraphic street art painted in various countries. In 2003, he moved outdoors by spraying a 30x40cm stencil on university walls to express to the "uncommon pressure" at the university which was "endured in silence." However, the motivations behind his art are not protest. He states that his art is simply personal expression: "A drawing on the street is similar to a letter: It proves that there is a writer."

In the Arab World, three major areas of interest can be identified: Lebanon, the Palestinian Territories and the Arab states that were involved in the Arab Spring. In these areas, graffiti has been perceived, both by the public and the media, as a barometer of the society. Lebanon's religious and ethnic diversity and its position at the crossroad of the Mediterranean basin and the Arab World have contributed to the appearance and development of an active youth culture and graffiti is part of it. Secondly, the Palestinian Territories are a space where graffiti is one of the most powerful forms of protest against what its inhabitants perceive as a contemporary form of colonization. Last but not least, the social importance of graffiti and its militant functions have recently been reflected by the international media, within the coverage of the uprisings in Tunisia, Egypt, Libya, Syria and Sudan. A graffiti artist from Sudan is Diab. The media coverage of the Arab Spring has drawn attention to a type of both artistic and political expression typical for the young people in the MENA region.

=== Europe ===
After growing up in Paris during the late 80s and early 90s, graffiti artist eL Seed found himself inspired by hip-hop culture. With parents from Temoula, Tunisia, he explored his North African origins by learning calligraphy. Before becoming an artist, he pursued degrees in marketing and business. After befriending a graffiti artist known as Hest1, he began to combine his love of graffiti and calligraphy. Today, he creates both personal exhibitions as well as murals for commission.

Also combining calligraphy with graffiti, Niels Meulman (also known as SHOE) coined the phrase "calligraffiti." Born in Amsterdam, SHOE has worked for ad agencies such as BBDO and the television channel MTV. The Metropolitan Museum of Art called calligraffiti "a new explosive art form."

=== West Africa ===
Another notable graffiti artist goes by the name of Pape Diop. He is notable for his Mystical Graffiti which is spiritual and social art. He's created a spiritual graffiti piece on the outside of a post office. It contained lots of photographs of Amadou Bamba, crosses, many photographs of a priest and at the top it says "Music in the time/ Man of the time." His art stands out from the other artists in the streets of Dakar because of the way he layers his art on top of each other to create an 3D effect.

== See also ==
- Islamic art
- Islamic calligraphy
