= Richard Gilbert =

Richard Gilbert may refer to:

- Richard Gilbert (professor), professor of economics
- Richard Gilbert (printer) (1794–1852), English printer and compiler of reference works
- Richard Gilbert (cricketer) (born 1980), English cricketer
- Richard fitz Gilbert (1030–1091), Norman lord
- Rick Gilbert (born 1943), American diver
- Dick Gilbert (rugby union), English rugby union player

== See also ==
- Dick Gilbert, American actor
