= A1one =

Iranian artist (born 1981)

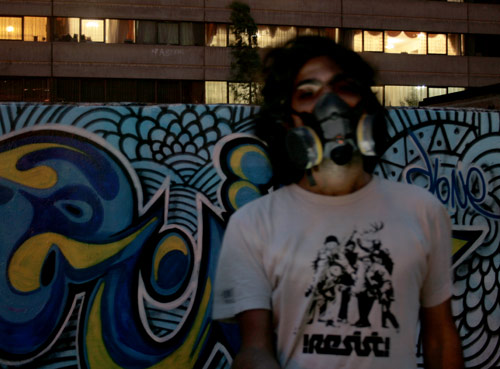
- Born: Karan Rashad; 1981 (age 44–45); Tehran, Iran
- Known for: Graffiti; Street art Underground art Sculpture; Islamic graffiti Social commentary Design
- Website: a1one.info

A1one (1981; pronounced /əˈloʊn/ alone; Persian: تنها, romanized: Tanhâ) is the pseudonym of Karan Reshad, an Iranian visual artist who pioneered graffiti and street art in Iran. His career as a street artist began in his hometown Tehran.

== Life and career ==
Born in 1981, A1one grew up in Iran during a period of war and the Khatami reform era (1997–2005). A1one studied for 5 years at the Faculty of Art and Architecture in one of the Universities in Tehran. While still a student, he began painting graffiti on the walls of his campus, as a protest against students' conditions. He was eventually expelled by the university's principal following a disagreement over religious restrictions.

After being expelled from the university, his graffiti activities in the city of Tehran increased. A1one was the first person to start painting on the city walls. Therefore, his name can be interpreted as "Alone" or "First One". A1one started painting walls in the late 1990s. He is the pioneer of the urban art scene in the Middle East. When he began, it was a time when nobody knew what graffiti was in his country. He had a very influential role in the rise of street art and stenciling within Iran.

Already involved in urban arts in general, he met the rapper, Nima, in 2005, who told him everything about the graffiti culture, which triggered A1one's desire to grow in that direction. His first significant work was a painting under the Tehran-Karaj expressway called Searching for Friends.

He started his street art project in 2003 and inspired his close friends at that time to also begin painting on the streets. Artists such as Elle, isba, K.T., and Magoi were the first people to join him in Tehran. With his public space art, he describes his view on Iranian society and puts himself regularly in danger.

"When I decided to do my painting on walls I bought some spray cans – at that time we had just some very low-quality colors in Iran. My first work was a very simple work titled "searching for friends" painted on a wall right next to the Tehran-Karaj expressway late at night. It was a frightening night for me... The next morning I got three calls from friends who recognized my style of painting. They were shocked to see my work on a public wall. My first stencil was a Munch's Scream Print on Art University walls and after that, experimented with many techniques and methods, but I continue with stencils, graffiti, and sticker art."

In 2007, he was invited to illustrate the cover of a book, Young and Defiant in Iran; a contemporary ethnographic work by Shahram Khosravi. In 2008, he was invited to show his work at the annual Melbourne Stencil Festival, taking 40 pieces of work with him to his first trip in a non-dictatorship country, thus experimenting exhibiting his artwork without the fear of reprisals for the first time.

By 2010, A1One was an established name within Tehran's youth culture and a key figure in the emergence of Iranian street art.

== Style ==
A1one's art world is dynamic and made of many different styles, from portraits to calligraphy and funky characters which he mostly uses for his stickers. A1one's art combines Persian calligraphy and Western graffiti. His art has been documented by many photographers and featured in Art Asia Pacific Magazine.

The artist has been working on a distinctly Iranian style of calligraffiti, which is "a fusion of hip-hop graffiti and Persian typography". His style is recognized across the Islamic graffiti world. He has made multiple style walls with Arabic letter graffiti since 2004.

== Selected exhibitions ==
=== Group shows (selected) ===
- 2005 "Portrait and Expression", Behzad Art Gallery, Tehran, Iran
- 2006 "Start Propaganda II", Los Angeles, USA
- 2007 "Process Invisible", Street Level Gallery, Portland, USA
- 2007 "Resist", La Condition Pablique, Roubaix, France
- 2007 "Spray 2007", Mehrin Art Gallery, Tehran, IRAN
- 2008 "Iranian Contemporary Artists Expo", Molavi Organization Hall, Tehran, IRAN
- 2008 "Visual Slang", Henry Art Settlement, NY, USA
- 2008 "400 ML", Paris, France
- 2008 "Melbourne Stencil Festival 08", Yarra Sculpture Gallery, Melbourne, Australia
- 2008 "Spray1387", Arete Gallery, Tehran, IRAN
- 2008 12 Inch Art, Winnipeg Canada
- 2008 Vinyl Killers, Portland, USA
- 2009 Your Kid Can't Do this / Group show Touring Australia
- 2009 Visual Slang III / New York
- 2009 Urban Art Agenda / Melbourne / Brisbane, Australia
- 2009 Brot And Kunst / Famous when Dead Gallery /Melbourne
- 2009 Group Show / Seyhoun Art Gallery / Tehran
- 2010 "Public Provocations", Carhartt Gallery – Weil am Rhein, Germany
- 2012 "Public Provocations", Carhartt Gallery – Weil am Rhein, Germany
- 2015 " Urban Art Biennale 2015", Voelklingen, Germany
- 2017 Signs of the Time, Gold Coast City Gallery, Australia

=== Solo shows ===
- 2005 "Alone / Pain Things", Seyhoun Art Gallery, Tehran, IRAN
- 2006 "October 1385", Mehrin Art Gallery, Tehran, IRAN
- 2007 "I am Not Political" (private Solo show), Kolahstudio, Tehran, IRAN
- 2008 "Spray it to the nation", Mehrin Art Gallery, Tehran, IRAN
- 2010 Ishq, Mathgoth Galerie, Paris, France
- 2010 Solo Show, Seyhoun Gallery, Tehran, IRAN
- 2013 The First Sign, Mathgoth Galerie, Paris, France
- 2019 From another world, S.F. Gallery, Essen, Germany

== Publications ==
- 2002 Turn the Night / As Author and Translator / The most credible book about the story of Rock and heavy metal music in the Persian language / ISBN 964-7380-10-0 / Mess Publications IRAN
- 2007 Street Art and the War on Terror ISBN 978-0-9553398-8-2 / Rebellion Books/ UK
- 2008 Young and Defiant in Tehran ISBN 0-8122-4039-1 /University of Pennsylvania Press (PENN)
- 2008 Arabesque / Die Gestalten Verlag / ISBN 978-3-89955-206-5 / Germany
- 2008 Stencil Nation / ISBN 978-1-933149-22-6 / ManicdPress USA
- 2008 400 ml ISBN 978-2-85980-011-6 / Kitchen93
- 2009 Stickers2 ISBN 978-3-89955-262-1 / Die Gestalten verlag /Germany
- 2009 The Ark ISBN 978-988-18-4701-0 / Systems-Design Limited (IDN)/ HongKong
- 2009 Urban IRAN ISBN 978-0-9799666-1-3 /Markbatty Publisher/USA
- 2010 Street Knowledge by King Adz ISBN 978-0007318698 Collins UK/Overlook Press (US)
- 2011 Graffiti 365 by Jayson Eddin ISBN 0810997444 Abrams (1 October 2011) (US)

== See also ==
- Islamic graffiti
- Tower 13
