= 10/8 =

10/8 may refer to:

- October 8 (month-day date notation)
- August 10 (day-month date notation)
- 10 shillings and 8 pence in UK predecimal currency
