= John Henry Gilbert =

British philatelist

John Henry Edwards Gilbert (10 April 1901 – 22 January 1974) was a British philatelist who was added to the Roll of Distinguished Philatelists in 1971.
