= Robert Gilbert =

Robert Gilbert may refer to:

- Robert Gilbert (chemist) (born 1946), Australian chemist
- Robert Gilbert (musician) (1899–1978), German musician
- Robert Gilbert (bishop) (died 1448), dean of York, bishop of London, 1436–1448
- Bobby Gilbert, Irish footballer
- Robert Gilbert (MP for Weymouth), member of parliament for Weymouth, 1390
- Robert Gilbert (MP for Gloucester) (fl. 1415–1432), MP for Gloucester
- Robert A. Gilbert (1870–1942), African-American nature photographer
- Bob Gilbert (1923–1991), Australian rugby league footballer
- Rob Gilbert (Robby Gilbert), American animator, illustrator, and cartoonist
- Robert Gilbert (actor), English and American actor, musician under the name Captain Backfire
