= Street Sultans =

Street Sultans Poster
- Directed by: Paliz Khoshdel and Zeinab Tabrizy
- Written by: Zeinab Tabrizy and Paliz Khoshdel
- Produced by: Zeinab Tabrizy and Jamshid Khoshdel
- Starring: Farid Lotfi; Farzad karami; Farnaz Nikokar; Reza Minoo
- Cinematography: Paliz Khoshdel and Farz Fesharaki
- Edited by: Paliz Khoshdel and Zeinab Tabrizy
- Production company: AVAN Film Productions
- Release date: 2010
- Running time: 39 minutes
- Country: Iran
- Language: Persian/English

Street Sultans is a Documentary about parkour in Iran.

== Story ==
There are several young people who were the pioneer of a dangerous street sport: Parkour. The sport is derived from modern cultural society. They are trying to hold a festival in Tehran.

== National awards ==
- Won “Special Award For The Best Film” from Iranian Critics and Writers Association, 2010
- Won “Best Semi-Long Film” Award from Independent “Image of the Year” Festival, 2010
- Won “Best Director” Award in Semi-Long Documentary section at “City” International Film Festival, 2011
- Won “Best Semi-Long Documentary Film” Award from “Iranian Cinema Ceremony“ at Iranian House Of Cinema 2011.

== International awards and screening ==
- Won “Best Film” Award at Six Weeks of Iranian Art, Canadian Film Festival 2012
- Earned “Certificate of Achievement” at Canada's 2nd Iranian Film Festival 2010
- Film Screening at Online Women Filmmakers (of Iran) Uppsala Film Festival, Sweden 2012
- Film Screening at DHfest film festival in Mexico city, 2014
- Film Screening at Cinéma(s) D’Iran 2014
- Film Screening at UCLA Celebration of Iranian Cinema, U.S.A 2013
- Participated at Media Wave Film Festival, Hungary 2013
