= David Gilbert (artist) =

American photographer (born 1982)

- Born: 1982 (age 43–44); New York City, United States
- Education: Tisch School of the Arts (BFA); University of California, Riverside (MFA)
- Known for: Photography

David Gilbert (born 1982) is an American contemporary photographer. His work explores intimacy, theatricality, and the act of world-building through staged studio tableaux. Using materials such as fabric, paper, and paint, he constructs temporary installations that he photographs in natural light before dismantling. His images transform these fragile constructions into enduring moments of tenderness and desire, situating his practice within contemporary dialogues on queer materiality and photographic performance. He is based in Los Angeles.

== Early life and education ==
Gilbert was born in 1982, in New York City. He received a Bachelor of Fine Arts degree from New York University's Tisch School of the Arts in 2004, and a Master of Fine Arts degree from the University of California, Riverside in 2011.

After relocating to Los Angeles, he developed a studio practice shaped by the city’s dramatic light and atmosphere, which mirrors the theatrical sensibility of his photographs.

== Career and work ==
Gilbert builds small, improvised sets in his studio—painted fabric, string, paper, and tape arranged with care and photographed in natural light. Once captured, these assemblages are dismantled, leaving the photograph as their only trace.

The studio functions as a private theater where Gilbert performs a form of queer world-making, constructing spaces that feel both intimate and otherworldly. Light operates as a central metaphor—revealing, touching, and binding the materials together in moments of tenderness and desire. His process, though rooted in the tradition of constructed photography, is driven less by concept than by feeling; it is intuitive and improvisational, more about care than control.

Gilbert has exhibited widely in the United States and abroad, including solo exhibitions at Klaus von Nichtssagend Gallery (New York), Rebecca Camacho Presents (San Francisco), and the North Carolina Museum of Art in Raleigh. His work is held in the collections of the Los Angeles County Museum of Art.

== Style and themes ==
Gilbert’s photographs blend autobiography and fiction, presenting objects as performers within a brief, illuminated moment.

Theatrical yet restrained, his work reflects a distinctly Los Angeles sensibility, using light as both subject and structure. Through these images, Gilbert builds a visual language of intimacy and desire, positioning his practice within contemporary dialogues on queer materiality and photographic performance.

== Solo exhibitions ==
- 2025: I Capture the Castle, Chris Sharp Gallery, Los Angeles, California
- 2024: Flutter, North Carolina Museum of Art, Raleigh, North Carolina
- 2018: House & Garden, Klaus von Nichtssagend Gallery, New York City, New York

== Group exhibitions ==
- 2023: 30th Artissima art fair, Milan, Italy

== See also ==
- Queer art
- Sheida Soleimani
