= John Gilbert (cricketer, born 1816) =

English cricketer

John Gilbert (7 March 1816 – 22 November 1887) was an English first-class cricketer active 1843–48 who played for Nottinghamshire. He was born and died in Mansfield.
