= Randy H. Skinner =

Randel (Randy) Hershel Skinner (born March 30, 1957) is a political, judicial and criminal justice consultant.

== Greater Dallas Justice Revival ==
Skinner received Mayor of Dallas Tom Leppert’s blessing in the fall of 2008 to begin planning for an urban summit. The summit would bring the West Dallas transformation model to South Dallas’ impoverished areas. The transformation process involved leaders from nearly every denomination and major non-profit in Dallas. Don Williams, noted developer and chairman of Trammel Crow, had formed the Foundation for Community Empowerment to eradicate poverty and crime in Dallas. Williams assisted in sponsoring the event. Skinner was chosen by Mayor Leppert to represent him in the movement, which grew to 300 city leaders, resulting in the launch of the Greater Dallas Justice Revival (GDJR). The GDJR was held in November 2009 in Dallas Market Hall Speakers at the event included noted, national leaders such as conservative Hispanic Republican Sam Rodriquez, Mayor Tom Leppert and noted Christian artists Jaci Velasqez, Salvador, Fred Hammond, and Israel Houghton and New Breed.

In the fall of 2009, the city leaders asked that Skinner lead the Greater Dallas Justice Revival movement. GDJR had agreed to focus on improving 25 inner city schools as well as the placement of 700 additional units of permanent supportive housing for homeless by 2014.

== City of Dallas Ethics Advisory Commission ==
Skinner was chosen by then Mayor Tom Leppert in 2008 to become chairman of the City of Dallas Ethics Advisory Commission. Mayor Leppert worked closely with Chairman Skinner to bring strong ethical reform to the city of Dallas. Some of the items passed by the advisory commission included the requirement that lobbyists register with the city of Dallas, a limit to the amount of campaign contributions that came from developers, the disclosure of gifts to council members over $50, and two city council members were now required to “second” major zoning cases certifying they had reviewed the details of the case before the matter could be voted on.

Mayor Leppert resigned as Dallas Mayor in 2011 in order to run for the Republican nomination of the U.S. Senate.

In the fall of 2011, newly elected Mayor Mike Rawlings asked Skinner to remain as chairman of the City of Dallas Ethics Commission and work with Dallas City Councilman Jerry Allen for a stronger culture of ethics within the city government

Skinner has been supported in his work to strengthen ethics in city government by the Dallas Morning News editorial board.

As a result of Skinner and Councilman Jerry Allen's leadership, an Ethics and Diversity Office was created to address ethics issues for city employees. In May 2014, an ethics officer was hired by the City of Dallas to work closely with the City Manager on ethical education and reform. Since that time, the Ethics Office has completed training for over 12,000 city employees using a two-hour training designed by nationally recognized Ethics Consultant Firm, Navigant.

Skinner began anew in 2013 working with Dallas Mayor Mike Rawlings to push for tighter ethical reform that included putting guidelines over the Mayor and City Councils office accounts, proper protocol on town hall meetings, guidelines on political activities for employees, and allowing the EAC (Ethics Advisory Commission) to begin working on the City of Dallas Election (Chapter 15A) guidelines for office holders and candidates.
