= Matt Gilbert =

American scholar and academic

Matthew Sakiestewa Gilbert
- Born: 1978 (age 47–48); Upper Moenkopi, Arizona, U.S.
- Citizenship: American
- Education: The Master's College (B.A.); Talbot School of Theology (M.A.); University of California, Riverside (M.A., Ph.D.)
- Occupations: Historian, professor
- Employer: University of Illinois at Urbana–Champaign
- Known for: Native American history, Hopi studies, Indian boarding schools
- Notable work: Education Beyond the Mesas; Hopi Runners; The Indian School on Magnolia Avenue (co-editor)
- Awards: Conrad Humanities Scholar Award (2015–2020); Dean's Fellowship (2015–2017); Spur Award (2013)

Matthew Sakiestewa Gilbert is a distinguished professor in the department of history at the University of Arizona. He is an enrolled member of the Hopi Tribe. A graduate of The Master's College, Talbot School of Theology, and the University of California, Riverside, Gilbert specializes in researching and teaching on Native American history and the American West.

== Education and career ==
Originally from the small village of Upper Moenkopi in northeastern Arizona, Gilbert graduated from The Master's College located in Santa Clarita, California, in 1999 with a B.A. in history. In 2001, he received an M.A. at the Talbot School of Theology in La Mirada, California. From there, he attended University of California, Riverside, and received an M.A. (2004) and Ph.D. (2006) in history. He examines the history of American Indian education, the Indian boarding school experience, and American Indians and sports. Gilbert became a full associate professor in August 2013 in the American Indian Studies and History and now holds his position in the department of history at the University of Illinois at Urbana–Champaign. Prior to this full-time teaching posts, he held the postdoctoral research associate in American Indian Studies. Prior to his postdoctoral position, he was an adjunct faculty member at The Master's College, University of Redlands, Azusa Pacific University, and San Bernardino Community College. His first book Education Beyond the Mesas examines the Hopi experience at Sherman Institute, an off reservation Indian boarding school in Riverside, CA. In this work, he demonstrates the intersection between education, indigenous studies, and history. The book reveals the complex ways that Hopi history and culture intersected with U.S. government policies. While providing a historical narrative, Gilbert's book challenges the dominant narrative that a study on the Indian boarding school experience must be unpacked primarily through a narrow view of the Indian education policies. He instead highlights Native agency and uncovers the ways Indian students—Navajos, Apaches, Zunis, and other Indian people—brought their personal identities to school and the ways they reacted to their boarding school experience as people from indigenous communities.

His second book Hopi Runners: Crossing the Terrain Between Indian and American, 1908-1932 (currently under contract) explores the manners in which Hopi marathon runners negotiated between school loyalties, U.S. nationalism, and tribal dynamics. He is also a co-editor of the anthology The Indian School on Magnolia Avenue: Voices and Images from Sherman Institute. Furthermore, Gilbert is the co-editor (with Coll Thrush and Charlotte Cote) of the book series Indigenous Confluences with the University of Washington Press.

He also served on the editorial board of the History of Education Quarterly, and he is a past board member of the Hopi Education Endowment Fund (2011–2013).

== Research interests ==
- 20th-century U.S. history
- Native American history
- History of the American West
- Southwest Indian history
- American Indian studies

== Works ==
=== Books ===
- Gilbert, Matthew Sakiestewa (2010). Education Beyond the Mesas: Hopi Students at Sherman Institute, 1902-1929. Indigenous education. Lincoln: University of Nebraska Press. ISBN 9780803216266. OCLC 729955947.
- ———; Trafzer, Clifford E.; Sisquoc, Lorene (2012). The Indian School on Magnolia Avenue: Voices and Images from Sherman Institute. First peoples. Corvallis: Oregon State University Press. ISBN 978-0-87071-693-5. OCLC 900091104.
- ——— (2018). Hopi Runners: Crossing the Terrain Between Indian and American. University Press of Kansas. ISBN 9780700626984. OCLC 1080608718.

=== Journal articles ===
- ——— (2008). "Hopi Summer: Letters from Ethel to Maud (review)". The American Indian Quarterly. 33 (1): 163–164. doi:10.1353/aiq.0.0032. S2CID 162375424.

== Honors and awards ==
- Conrad Humanities Scholar Award, College of Liberal Arts and Sciences, University of Illinois at Urbana-Champaign, 2015-2020
- Dean's Fellowship, College of Liberal Arts and Sciences, University of Illinois at Urbana-Champaign, 2015-2017
- Helen Corley Petit Scholar Award, College of Liberal Arts and Sciences, University of Illinois at Urbana-Champaign, 2013–2014. Award given to junior faculty with tenure and promotion cases of "outstanding merit."
- Spur Award for "Marathoner Louis Tewanima and the Continuity of Hopi Running, 1908-1912" (Western Historical Quarterly), Best Western Short Nonfiction, Western Writers of America (2013)
