= Daniel Gilbert =

Daniel Gilbert may refer to:

- Daniel A. Gilbert (1889–1970), American police officer
- Daniel Gilbert (psychologist) (born 1957), American psychology professor
- Dan Gilbert (born 1962), US businessman, majority owner of the Cleveland Cavaliers
- Daniel Gilbert (basketball) (born 1983), American basketball player
