= Murder of Michael Gilbert =

2009 murder in England

Michael Gilbert
- Born: 3 September 1982
- Died: 21/22 January 2009 (age 26)
- Cause of death: murder
- Body discovered: Arlesey, England, United Kingdom

The murder of Michael Gilbert occurred in 2009 in the United Kingdom. His decapitated body was found in a lake in Arlesey, England. He had for years been kept as a slave and subjected to abuse by the Watt family, six of whom – including James Watt, the ringleader – were jailed for their role in the murder. Gilbert, who had an unstable childhood, was considered a vulnerable and naive man who was easily exploited.

After his death, reports were published by Luton Safeguarding Vulnerable Adults Board (LSVAB) and the Independent Police Complaints Commission (IPCC) which identified failings by public services involved in Gilbert's case.

== Background ==
Gilbert was born in 1982 into an unstable home, and spent parts of his childhood in care. He was the third of five children. The family moved frequently. In 1993, his sister accused him of having sexually assaulted her; the result of this sexual assault investigation was inconclusive. In 1997, his mother told police that Gilbert had sexually assaulted a boy. He attended Halyard High School and was bullied at school, and underwent a mastectomy when he was 13. He met Watt in 1998 when they were both living in a children's home. He was also bullied at children's homes and seen as easy to manipulate. By 2000, Gilbert had several criminal convictions and cautions, and had spent time in prison and in a Young offenders' institution; Watt was also well known to the police.

== Abuse and death ==
After leaving the children's home, Gilbert continued to associate with Watt, moving in and out of Watt's various Luton homes until his death. While living with the Watt family, he was frequently beaten and tortured, forced to work as a slave, and had his benefit money taken from him. The abuse, some of which was captured on video, included: being stabbed, hit with a baseball bat, shot at with an air pistol, forced to drink his own urine, and forced to stand in boiling water. He was also forced to sleep chained to his bed to stop him from escaping. When he did escape, the Watt family would use his National Insurance number to find out where he was claiming his benefits so they could bring him back, although there were occasions when he returned of his own volition. Gilbert's sister was Watt's girlfriend and lived with him during the early part of the abuse; she later told the court she had seen Gilbert being attacked and had suffered violence herself.

The Watt family was described by the LSVAB report as a "caricature of the neighbours from hell", and was, according to Julian Sturdy of BBC News, "Luton's most notorious anti-social neighbours." The family, most of whom were unemployed, moved addresses continuously, kept pit-bull-type dogs and giant lizards, and were known for their violence and criminality; by 2001 the police had visited the family 112 times.

On 10 May 2009, Gilbert's decapitated body, with various other parts missing, was found in the Blue Lagoon; the head and the other parts were not found until February 2010. Detectives believe he died overnight between 21 and 22 January 2009. A murder investigation was started and several arrests were made. The pathologist who examined the body found that the aorta had been cut, there were stab wounds on the chest, and internal injuries to the stomach and intestine, but was unsure of the precise cause of death.

== Trial ==
The trial into the murder began in February 2010. In April, James Watt; his girlfriend, Natasha Oldfield; and Nichola Roberts, the girlfriend of James's brother Richard, were found guilty of Gilbert's murder. Richard Watt; Robert Watt, James's brother; and the mother of the brothers, Jennifer Smith-Dennis, were found guilty of familial homicide. (Note: Introduced by the Domestic Violence, Crime and Victims Act 2004, familial homicide is "the offence of causing or allowing the death of a child or vulnerable adult" and was "designed to ensure those jointly accused of the murder of such a person cannot avoid prosecution by blaming each other or remaining silent".) All six were also found guilty of perverting the course of justice. Antonio Watt, the father of the brothers, was acquitted of familial homicide and perverting the course of justice. James Watt received a sentence of 36 years, Oldfield 18, Roberts 15, Richard 6, Robert 8, and Smith-Dennis 10. The judge, John Bevan, considered giving James Watt a whole-life sentence, but did not because he thought he would have regarded it as a "badge of honour". Bevan described the case as a "grotesque story", and said Michael Gilbert had died a "cruel, lonely and violent death".

In May 2011, Richard Watt had his sentence reduced to four years on appeal because he helped to convict the others and to find the other body parts. The appeals of Watt, Oldfield, and Roberts were rejected.

== Aftermath ==
LSVAB published a Serious Case Review in 2011 which found that the response by police, social workers and medical professionals involved in his case was inadequate. It made eight recommendations for improvement. The report said that Gilbert's childhood led to his being "literally and emotionally abandoned without consistent or predictable guidance".

A report was published by the IPCC in 2011 which found that three police investigations involving Gilbert were flawed.

Following the report by the Luton board, Trevor Holden, chief executive of Luton Borough Council, said "the council and its partners are determined to learn the lessons from this Serious Case Review".

== See also ==
- List of solved missing person cases (post-2000)

== Notes and references ==
Notes

== Sources ==
- Flynn, Margaret. "The Murder of Adult A (Michael Gilbert): A Serious Case Review" (PDF). Archived from the original (PDF) on 29 September 2011. (91.3 KB). Luton Safeguarding Vulnerable Adults Board. May 2010. Retrieved 8 July 2011. 9 July 2011.
