= David M. Gilbert =

American molecular biologist

- Education: University of California, San Diego (BA); Stanford University (PhD)
- Scientific career
- Fields: Molecular biology
- Institutions: SUNY Upstate Medical University; Florida State University; San Diego Biomedical Research Institute

David M. Gilbert is an American molecular biologist, known for work in DNA replication. He is an investigator at the San Diego Biomedical Research Institute. Gilbert was formerly a professor of molecular biology in the Department of Biological Science and was co-founder and a director of the Center for Genomics and Personalized Medicine at Florida State University.

== Education and career ==
Gilbert received his BA degrees in Biochemistry/Cell Biology and Philosophy from the University of California, San Diego and his PhD in Genetics from Stanford University. He did two post-doctoral training periods, first as an EMBO fellow with Pierre Chambon in Strasbourg, France, studying transcriptional control, and second as a Roche fellow with Melvin DePamphilis studying replication origin recognition.

He joined the faculty at State University of New York (SUNY) Upstate Medical University in 1994 and was appointed full professor in 2003. In 2006, he moved to Florida State University. He was elected as a fellow of the American Association for the Advancement of Science (AAAS) in 2008, as well as becoming a member of the American Society of Hematology in 2013 and the International Society for Stem Cell Research in 2014. Gilbert's other awards include being named Florida State University Distinguished Research Professor (2015), the Pfeiffer Endowed Professorship for Cancer Research (2015), and the Florida State University Graduate Mentorship award (2016).

Gilbert’s work focuses on the mechanisms regulating DNA replication during the cell cycle and the relationship between DNA replication and structural and functional organization of chromosomes, most recently during differentiation in human and mouse embryonic stem cells and in pediatric leukemia.

He is a former principal investigator in the NIH Encyclopedia of DNA Elements (ENCODE) Consortium (2011–2017), and is a member of the NIH 4D Nucleome consortium and the Southeast Stem Cell Consortium (SESCC). He has served on American Cancer Society (1996–2004) and NIH study sections (1997–present), is an editorial member of the Epigenetics Society and is on the editorial board of the Journal of Cell Biology (2008–2021). He also maintains ReplicationDomain, a free online database resource for storing, sharing and visualizing large-scale chromosome mapping data.

In 2020, Florida State University conducted an investigation into Gilbert's behavior prompted by accusations of sexual misconduct. The report concluded that Gilbert’s “gendered, sexualized and invasive behaviors were severe and pervasive”, and Florida State University removed Gilbert's endowed chair and suspended him without pay for ten days. Gilbert acknowledged some of the alleged incidents and said others were "hearsay, taken out of context, or false", and attributed some of his behavior to "poor judgement" resulting from events in his personal life. He resigned and moved to the San Diego Biomedical Research Institute in June 2021, taking two NIH grants with him. Even though NIH policy required FSU to alert the agency of the investigation and its conclusion in initiating the grant transfers, FSU did not share the report with NIH. NIH later learned the severity of the violations, but awarded another grant to Gilbert in May 2022.
