= Paliz Khoshdel =

Iranian documentary filmmaker

- پالیز خوشدل
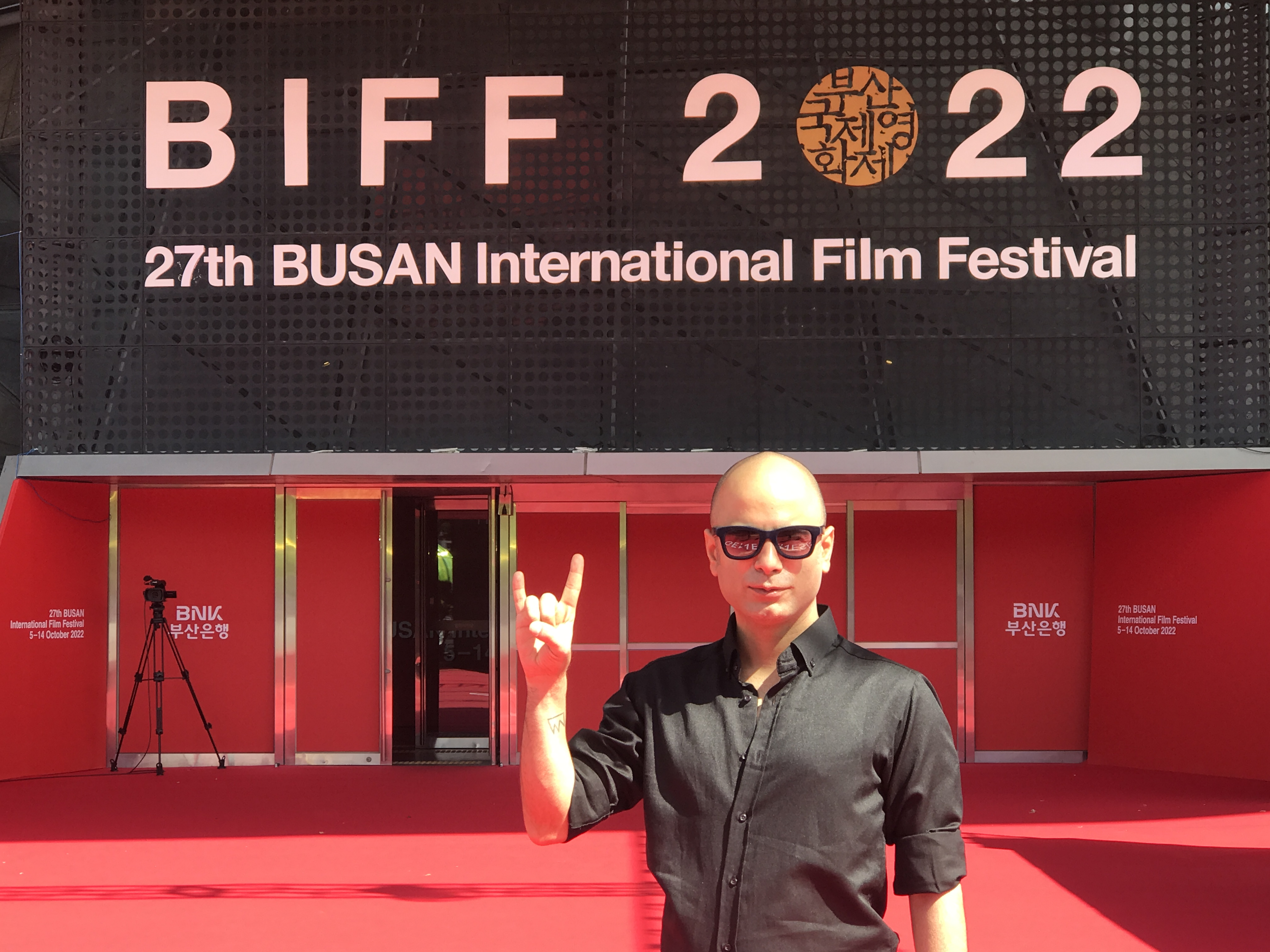
- Khoshdel at the Busan International Film Festival in 2022
- Born: 25 November 1985 (age 40); Rasht, Iran
- Occupations: Film director, producer, editor, cinematographer, painter
- Years active: 2006-present
- Known for: Documentary and experimental filmmaking
- Notable work: The Football Aficionado Street Sultans; Mutiny of Colours Makhoola Rises!
- Awards: Mecenat Award – Busan International Film Festival (2022) Best Documentary – Madrid (2024) Best Sports Documentary – India (2023)
- Website: paliz.art

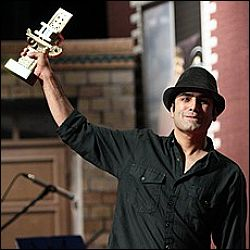
Paliz Khoshdel in 2011

Paliz Khoshdel (Persian: پالیز خوشدل; born 25 November 1985) is an Iranian documentary filmmaker, producer, editor, cinematographer and painter. He was born in Rasht, Iran. His films have focused on Iranian youth culture, underground communities, street art, parkour and women's access to public life in Iran.

Khoshdel directed and produced films including Ancient Heritage, Street Sultans, Mutiny of Colours, Apnea, Makhoola Rises! and The Football Aficionado. In 2022, he co-directed and co-produced The Football Aficionado, a documentary about Zahra Khoshnavaz, an Iranian football supporter who challenged restrictions on women entering football stadiums. The film had its world premiere in the Wide Angle section of the 27th Busan International Film Festival, where it won the BIFF Mecenat Award for Asian documentary.

== Career ==
Khoshdel began working as a documentary and experimental filmmaker in the late 2000s. DAFilms lists his early work as including Street Sultans and Mutiny of Colours, and credits him as producer of On Underground and Remission. His early work also included cinematography credits on documentary projects such as Asbe Chobi, Waltz for Tehran and I Am a Happy Actor, according to Iranian documentary and experimental-cinema listings.

Street Sultans documents young parkour practitioners in Iran and follows their attempts to organize a festival in Tehran. The film's subject includes the obstacles faced by the parkour community while trying to hold a public festival in the city. DAFilms credits Khoshdel as a director, screenwriter, editor and cinematographer on the film.

Mutiny of Colours focuses on street art and graffiti in Iran. Coverage of the project described it as following several Iranian street artists and discussing the social and legal pressures surrounding street art in the country. Artists connected with the project included CK1, Icy & Sot and Omet.

On Underground is a documentary about two hip-hop dancers in Iran; Khoshdel produced and edited the film.

Makhoola Rises! continued Khoshdel's documentary work around Makhoola. The film concerns the Iranian alternative-rock group as the band worked on its first album and sought to stage concerts in Rasht and Tehran.

The Football Aficionado follows Zahra, a football fan in Tehran, and addresses the exclusion of women from Iranian football stadiums. The film was later distributed by Journeyman Pictures and screened at festivals including the Kerala International Documentary and Short Film Festival, Impact Human Rights Film Festival of Catalonia and the Iranian Documentary Film Festival Munich.

In 2026, Khoshdel co-directed the short science-fiction film ''Centaur'' with Sharmin Mojtahedzadeh. The film follows a woman who discovers that her pregnancy and her husband are part of a controlled experiment involving artificial creation. The project was produced using generative tools from Google AI Studio.

Paliz Khoshdel receiving an Athletic Club Bilbao jersey at the 2024 Thinking Football Film Festival in Bilbao, Spain.

== Documentary films ==
Title	Time	Format	Year
Ancient Heritage	20 min	DV	2009
Street Sultans	40 min	DV	2010
Mutiny of Colours	70 min	HD	2017
Makhoola Rises!	70 min	HD	2020-2024
Apnea	9 min	HD	2019
The Football Aficionado	85 min	4K	2018-2022
Centaur	10 min	4K	2026

== Filmography ==
Year	Title	Role(s)	Notes
2009	Ancient Heritage	Director, editor, Cinematographer	Short Documentary
2010	Street Sultans	Director, writer, editor, cinematographer, producer	Documentary about parkour in Iran.
2011	Asbe Chobi	Editor, Cinematographer	Short Documentary
2011	Waltz for Tehran	Cinematographer	Documentary about Street Music in Tehran.
2012	On Underground	Producer, editor	Documentary about two hip-hop dancers in Iran; listed by DAFilms in Khoshdel's filmography.
2013	Better Than Life	Producer, editor, Cinematographer	Documentary about Video Game industry
2015	Without Ticket	Editor	Listed by Cinema Verite.
2017	Mutiny of Colours	Director, producer, editor, cinematographer	Documentary about Iranian street art.
2017	Watching the Other	Editor	Short documentary.
2018	Simulation of Mr. Yellow	Editor	Listed by Cinema Verite.
2019	I Am a Happy Actor	Cinematographer	Listed by Cinema Verite.
2019	Apnea	Director, producer, editor, Cinematographer	Experimental short.
2022	The Football Aficionado	Director, producer, editor, cinematographer	Winner of the BIFF Mecenat Award at the 27th Busan International Film Festival.
2023	Re/Cinema	Producer, editor	Short Documentary.
2024	Makhoola Rises!	Director, producer, editor, Cinematographer	Documentary.
2024	The Scar	Producer, editor, VFX	Feature film directed by Moein Rezaei Rad; FilmFreeway lists Khoshdel among the producers.
2026	Centaur	Director, Producer, editor	Short, Ai Movie
	Middle of Middle East	Editor, producer	Documentary.

== Awards and screenings ==
Year	Work	Event	Result
2010	Street Sultans	Iranian Critics and Writers Association	Special Award for Best Film
2010	Street Sultans	Tehran International Short Film Festival	International distributor award
2010	Street Sultans	Image of the Year Festival	Best Semi-Long Film
2010	Street Sultans	Canada's 2nd Iranian Film Festival	Certificate of Achievement
2011	Street Sultans	City International Film Festival	Nominated, Best Film and Best Director
2011	Street Sultans	City International Film Festival	Best Director, Semi-Long Documentary
2011	Street Sultans	Iranian House of Cinema	Nominated for editing, music, cinematography and directing
2011	Street Sultans	Iranian House of Cinema	Best Semi-Long Documentary Film
2012	Street Sultans	Six Weeks of Iranian Art, Canadian Film Festival	Best Film
2012	Street Sultans	Online Women Filmmakers of Iran, Uppsala Film Festival	Screening
2013	Street Sultans	UCLA Celebration of Iranian Cinema	Screening
2013	Street Sultans	Mediawave Film Festival	Participation
2014	Street Sultans	DHfest, Mexico City	Screening
2014	Street Sultans	Cinéma(s) d'Iran	Screening
2013	On Underground	Image of the Year Festival	Best Documentary
2014	On Underground	Khorshid Independent Film Festival	Honorary diploma
2014	On Underground	Tehran International Short Film Festival	Nominated for Best Director and Best Editing
2014	On Underground	Cinema Verite	Nominated for Best Director
2022	The Football Aficionado	Busan International Film Festival	BIFF Mecenat Award, Asian documentary
2023	The Football Aficionado	Cinema of The World International Film Festival	Best Documentary, sports category
2023	The Football Aficionado	International Documentary Film Festival Flahertiana	Official selection
2023	The Football Aficionado	Kerala International Documentary and Short Film Festival	Screening
2023	The Football Aficionado	Festival del Cinema dei Diritti Umani di Napoli	Screening
2023	The Football Aficionado	Cinéma(s) d'Iran	Screening
2024	The Football Aficionado	Madrid International Festival of Independent Cinema	Best Documentary Film
2024	The Football Aficionado	Northern Character International Film Festival	Diploma for Strong Character and Love for Football
2024	The Football Aficionado	Impact Human Rights Film Festival of Catalonia	Official selection
2024	The Football Aficionado	Iranian Documentary Film Festival Munich	Official selection
