= 108 (artist) =

Italian artist (born 1978)

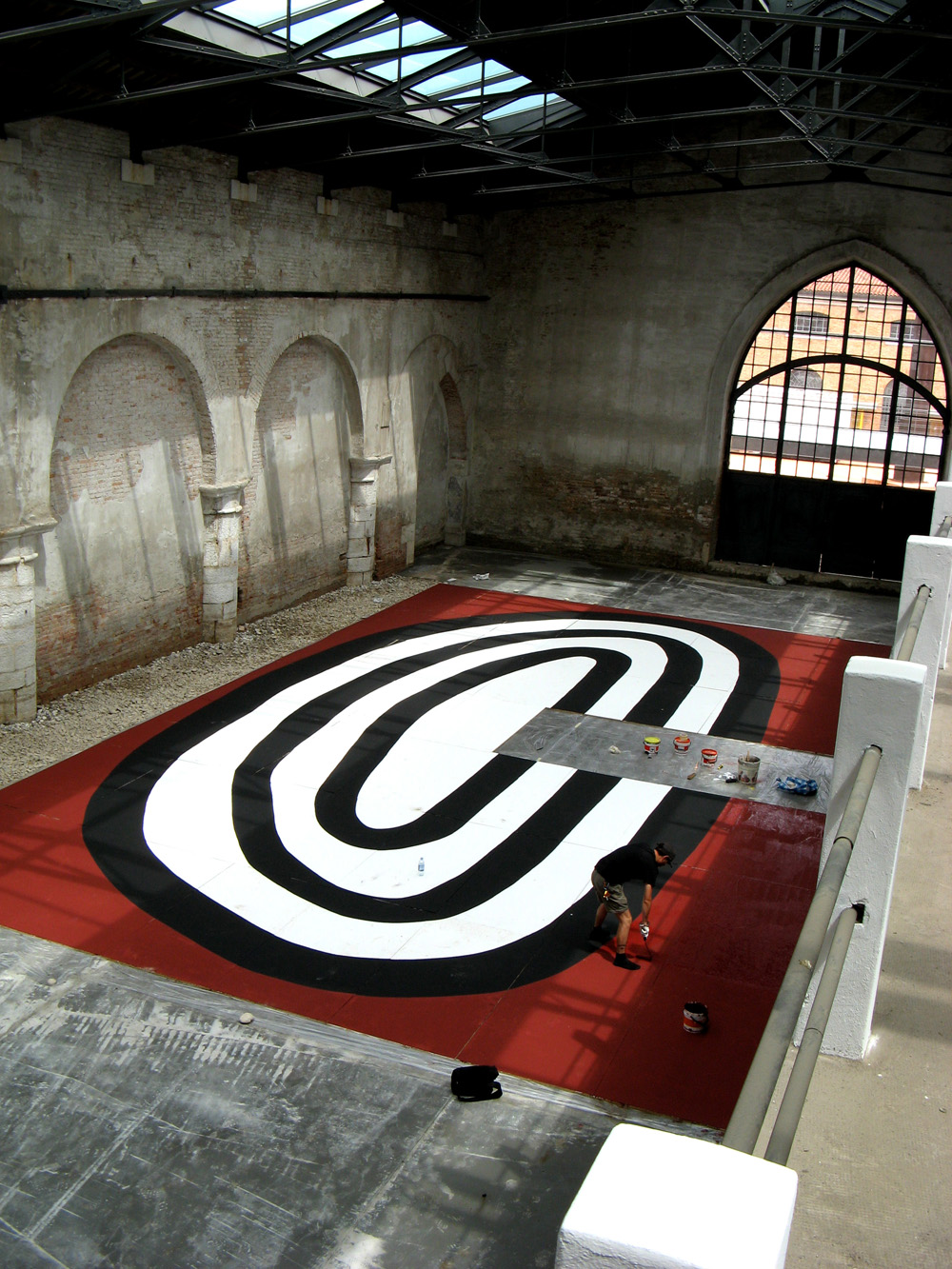
- 108 working in Venezia
- Born: 1978 (age 47–48); Alessandria, Piedmont, Italy
- Known for: Graffiti, Street Art
- Website: http://www.108nero.com/

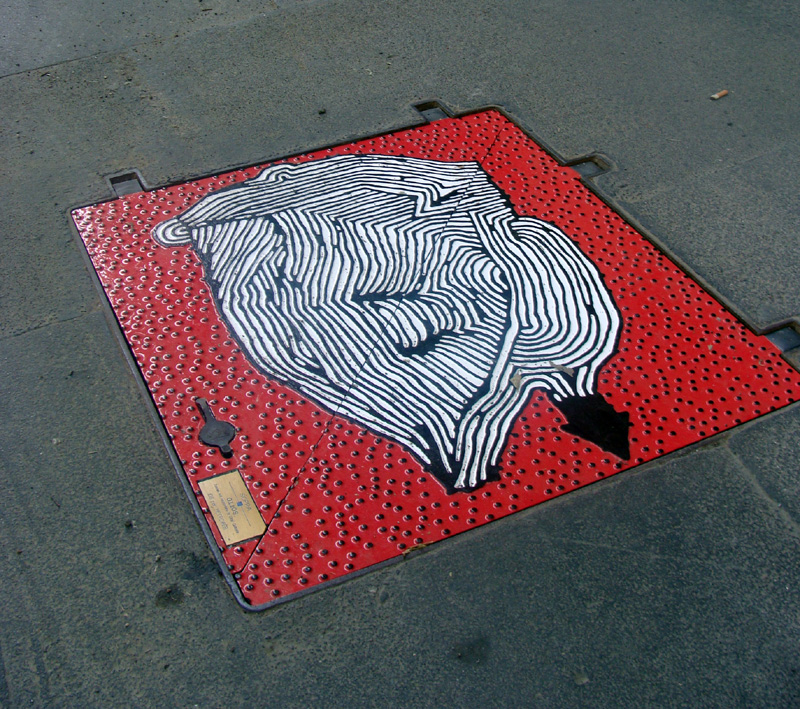
Manhole cover painted by 108 in Milan, Italy.

108 (born 1978) is an Italian artist in the field of street art and contemporary art from Alessandria.

== Career ==
108 has moved from working in traditional graffiti art to painting large and mysterious figures that invade public spaces. He was the first writer to use numbers instead of letters for his name. He started to work when he was a child on the streets of Alessandria, and used different names. His work has appeared on the streets of Milan, Paris, London, Berlin, and New York City. His first works known by people are enigmatic “blob”-like yellow shapes. It is his firm intention to make visual chaos. His new works are labyrinths, dead trees, non figurative 3D objects and installations, but especially black and gloomy shapes, becoming one of the biggest and influential artists in graffiti abstractism. In the last years, he took part in a lot of international exhibitions: Nusign 2.4 in Paris, Urban Edge Show in Milan, Segundo and Tercer Asalto in Zaragoza and, in 2007 he was invited to join the project called Walls inside the Biennale di Venezia with JR and Daim. During March 2008 he was invited to join Nomadaz (a show curated by Pablo Aravena) in Los Angeles with Eltono, Dem, Microbo and other artists to represent Europe in the U.S.A. 108's doomy black abstractions are engaging and challenging in equal measure. Whether it be within the confines of a small room in the abandoned monastery, where the large triangular constructions are most effective and have the effect of warping and playing with the room's dimensions as the viewer attempts to back away and comprehend the pieces, or as a surreal floating void on a wall beside a busy road.

== Principal exhibits ==
- 2014 - Genius Loci, Sale d'Arte City of Alessandria, Italy.
- 2013 - La Tour, Curated by Galerie Itinerrance, Paris, France.
- 2012 - Seventeen Dens, solo show, Ego Gallery, Lugano, Switzerland.
- 2011 - Fame festival 2010, Grottaglie, Taranto, Italy.
- 2011 - La forma dell'inverno, solo show, curated by Pietro Rivasi, Spazio Avia Pervia, Modena, Italy.
- 2010 - Agli antipodi della realtà, Solo show, curated by Guillaume Von Holden, Zelle Arte Contemporanea, Palermo, Italy.
- 2010 - Sweet Sheets (Moves to Modica), Palazzo della Cultura di Modica, Modica, Italy.
- 2010 - Fame festival 2010, Grottaglie, Taranto, Italy.
- 2009 - L'eterno ascoltare delle pietre, solo show, Studiodieci - Vercelli, Italy.
- 2008 - Nomadaz, Los Angeles, US.
- 2007 - ASA, curated by Cesare Bignotti, Palazzetto Santa Maria, Genoa, Italy.
- 2007 - Walls - Venice Biennale, Venezia.
- 2006 - Segundo Asalto, Zaragoza, Spain.
- 2006 - EVES, curated by Cesare Bignotti, Loggia Piazza Banchi, Genoa, Italy.
- 2005 - Urban Edge Show, Milan.
- 2004 - Nusign 2.4, Paris.
- 2003 - Street art show, Leeds.
