= Michael William Gilbert =

- Born: August 17, 1954 (age 72)
- Origin: New York, New York, United States
- Genres: Electronic music World Music; Avant-garde rock
- Occupations: Musician, Computer Research Analyst
- Instruments: Synthesizer; Percussion; Flute; Guitar
- Years active: 1978–present
- Labels: Gibex Recordings; Palace of Lights
- Website: www.mwgilbert.com

Michael William Gilbert (born August 17, 1954) is an American music composer working in the genres of electronic music and world music.

== Biography ==
Michael William Gilbert grew up in Connecticut and Brussels, Belgium. While living in Europe he first encountered the music of Varese, Stockhausen, and Pierre Henry, as well as music of India, Africa, and Japan. After studying electrical engineering at MIT, he continued studies in music at the Boston School of Electronic Music, later as a teacher and designer of synthesis systems. He graduated with a degree in music from Hampshire College, and shortly thereafter became the technical director of electronic music studios at Amherst College, Smith College, Hampshire College, and the University of Massachusetts Amherst. He has since taught electronic music at Hampshire College, the University of Massachusetts Amherst, and Holyoke Community College.

MW Gilbert has been composing and recording actively from the 1970's through the present. In 1978 he released his first LP, “Moving Pictures”, with the goal of humanizing electronic music, using wooden flutes, percussion, and voice to complement synthesized sounds and textures. “The Call” (1980), his second LP, grew out of a desire to set jazz-influenced solo lines against a backing of drone, percussion, and soundscapes, also evoking aspects of Eastern music. “The Call” marks MW Gilbert's first work with multi-wind and reed player Tim Moran, experimental percussionist/vocalist David Moss, and acoustic bassist Salvatore Macchia. The LP “In the Dreamtime” (1982) followed and is a refinement of ideas germinated on the first two records. It uses a theme of dream imagery, exploring and merging distinctions between electronics, new jazz, and world music, and features work with Moran, Moss, and Macchia, as well as master drummer Royal Hartigan.

Moving to compact disc as one of the first independent artists to do so, MW Gilbert released “The Light in the Clouds” (1987), and “Point of Views” (1988). A collaboration with percussionist Tony Vacca, bassist Salvatore Macchia, and synthesist Roy Finch, “The Light in the Clouds” brings together African, Jewish, Christian, and Shinto music traditions and melds them with clear sound quality and rhythmic elements. “Point of Views” is a solo recording realized entirely in his (then new) MIDI/computer-based studio, weaving elements of jazz, world, and electronic into an ethereal and distinct blend. “Point of Views” received a four-star rating in Downbeat Magazine. Although primarily a solo work, it features percussion by Tony Vacca on one track. MW Gilbert signed a recording contract with Penta Disc Recordings (WEA) for the Canadian release of music from this repertoire.

After a few long breaks from recording, two new CD projects were released. “Other Voices” (2000), with more collaboration with Tony Vacca and Roy Finch. This was followed by “I Can See from Here” (2010), a complex weave of jazz, folk, electronic soundscape, world music, and electroacoustic ambience. It features a track with guitarist and friend Peter Kaukonen (Black Kangaroo, Jefferson Airplane, Jefferson Starship, Johnny Winter).

MW Gilbert's first three LP recordings, “Moving Pictures”, “The Call”, and “In the Dreamtime” were remastered and rereleased on CD, making the complete catalog to date available again, on both disc and digital distribution channels.

Composed with the aim of creating music for potential live performance, “Secret Stories” (2015) is a complex work encompassing many faces of electronic music old and new, jazz, contemporary classical, and influences from multicultural folk music. He released “Radio Omnibus” (2018), with cutting edge electronic music, two acoustic chamber pieces, and features collaborations with Adam Holzman (Miles Davis, Steven Wilson) and Mark Walker (Oregon, Lyle Mays).

This was followed by “Voice Ping Strum”, a vinyl only release. It has two extended suites, one on each side. It was realized in the studio using Eurorack modular, voice, and piano. It comes on the 40th anniversary of the release of his first album, “Moving Pictures”.

In recent years, MW Gilbert has released a series of singles and albums (see Discography below), often working with Adam Holzman.

MW Gilbert's music has been played in concerts and festivals in North America and Europe and has been used by choreographers in conjunction with modern dance works, including Susan Waltner, Valerie Feit, Jan Wodynski, and Paula Josa-Jones.

MW Gilbert retired from an almost 30-year career as Adviser for Technology Initiatives and Services for the University of Massachusetts Amherst. On campus and in the community, he was engaged in research on internet media technologies, mobile devices, virtual teaching, strategic planning, as well as developing/supporting internet and technology cloud services. He is now able to work full time on music and is a consultant with his son Daniel's business Tall Dog Electronics, which has a growing line of Euro rack modules, all used on “Voice Ping Strum”!

In 2025 Gilbert released a genre-divergent EP, "Tangled Roots Project". It explores the distinctly American music—jazz, blues, rock, folk, bluegrass, R&B that he grew up surrounded by. While these influences shaped his work in electronic and electroacoustic music, this project deliberately and directly explores the tangled mix of roots.

Gilbert continues to release new works of original electronic/electroacoustic fusion music. His latest release is the single "They Are Us / They Fly Away".

== Discography ==
- Moving Pictures (Gibex 001), 1978
- The Call (Gibex 002), 1980
- In The Dreamtime (Palace of Lights 02/2000), 1982
- The Light in the Clouds (Gibex 003), 1986
- Point of Views (Gibex 004), 1988
- Other Voices (Gibex 005), 2000
- I Can See from Here (Gibex 006), 2010
- Secret Stories (Gibex 007), 2015
- Radio Omnibus (Gibex 008), 2018 (with Adam Holzman)
- Voice Ping Strum (Gibex 009), 2019
- The Outside Inside (Gibex 010), 2020 (EP)
- She Looked Back (Gibex 011), 2020 (Single, with Adam Holzman)
- Miles to Go (Gibex 012), 2020 (Single, with Adam Holzman)
- Moving On (Gibex 013), 2021 (Single)
- The Vanished Day (Gibex 014), 2021 (EP)
- The Light That Wraps Me and All Things (Gibex 015), 2022 (Single, with Adam Holzman)
- Samsara (Gibex 016), 2022 (with Adam Holzman)
- Surround(ings) (Gibex 017), 2023 (EP, with Adam Holzman) Dolby Atmos versions of 3 Samsara tracks
- Cognitive Dissonance (Live) (Gibex 018), 2023 (Single)
- Densities of Light / Shimmering Lake (Gibex 019), 2023 (Single, with Adam Holzman)
- Signals (Gibex 020), 2024 (Single)
- Enhanced Surround(ings) (Gibex 021), 2024 (with Adam Holzman)
- Shadow Memories (Gibex 022), 2024 (Single)
- Dancing in the Lighthouse (Gibex 023), 2024 (Single)
- Flowers of Edo LIVE (Gibex 024), 2025 (EP)
- Endangered Species (Gibex 025), 2025 (Single)
- Tangled Roots Project (Gibex 026), 2025 (EP)
- Radiant Departures (Gibex 027), 2026 (Single)
- Electronic Music (Gibex 028), 2026
- Wheel Within the Wheel (Gibex 029), 2026 (EP)
- They Are Us / They Fly Away (Gibex 030), 2026 (Single)

(albums, unless otherwise noted)
