= Saman and Sasan Oskouei =

Iranian artist duo and activists (born 1985 and 1991)

Saman Oskouei (born 1985) and Sasan Oskouei (born 1991) also known as Icy & Sot, are Iranian multidisciplinary artist and activists, and brothers from Tabriz, Iran, currently located in Brooklyn, New York. The brothers collaboratively create nuanced political work, known for its simplicity yet resiliency and positive undertone. They address humanitarian topics such as borders and refugees, capitalism and inequalities, women's rights, and environmental issues. While the nature of the messages Saman and Sasan convey is quite consistent throughout their work, the techniques and materials used are versatile and playful; from paintings and sculptures, performances and interventions, to videos and photography. In their approach, the medium is secondary to the message and serves to support and deliver the latter.

== Career ==
Saman and Sasan Oskouei started their art practice in the streets of Tabriz, Iran in the 2000s. Under their nickname Icy & Sot, the duo first combined its interest for skateboarding, its aesthetic and culture, with street art using mainly stencils. Their work addressed social and humanitarian issues in an environment with limited tolerance for freedom of thoughts and speech. Navigating this environment required speed of execution and discretion, which influenced their work and led them to explore methods that enable complex work to be quickly executed in an urban setting.

The duo migrated to Brooklyn, United States, in 2012, where they practice under their names, Saman and Sasan Oskouei, together forming Oskouei Studio. While the first decade of their work was that of street artists, the second decade greatly focused on interventions, installations and sculptures using materials such as wood or steel.

Amongst others, they are known for revisiting chain-link fences to create sculptures surfacing realities of borders, migration and identity. An example of these works is their permanent art installation in Lisbon, Portugal, of a European flag made of steel fence and barbed wire, evoking the physical barriers and difficult conditions faced by asylum seekers while conveying the hope that takes them through that journey.

== Work ==
=== Publication ===
“Let her be free”, a book featuring ten years of work, which they signed under the name Icy & Sot, was published in 2016.

=== Public art installations ===
- 2018, The New America, Times Square Arts (New York, USA)
- 2018, Open door, The Crystal Ship Festival (Ostend, Belgium)
- 2020, EU FLAG, Permanent Public Art Intervention (Lisbon, Portugal)
- 2021, Untitled, Bien Urbain Festival (Besançon, France)
- 2022, Golden Pyramid, Völklingen Hütte (Saarbrücken, Germany)
- 2022, Bricks of a revolution, Four freedom park (New York, USA)

=== Solo exhibitions ===
- 2012, Made in Iran, Openhouse Gallery (New York, United States)
- 2015, CUTitALISM, Reed Projects Gallery (Stavanger, Norway)
- 2018, A Moment of Clarity, MOCO museum (Amsterdam, the Netherlands)
- 2020, Fences Faces, Danysz Gallery (Paris, France)

=== Selected group exhibitions ===
- 2009, From the Streets of Iran, Crewest Gallery (California, United States)
- 2012, Stencil, Dastan Basement Gallery (Tehran, Iran)
- 2012, Street Art – The New Generation, Pori Art Museum (Pori, Finland)
- 2014, NYC to Tehran, Seyhoun Art Gallery (Tehran, Iran)
- 2015, Brotherhood, Jonathan LeVine Gallery (New York, United States)
- 2016, Magic City Life (Dresden, Germany and Stockholm, Sweden)
- 2017, Flourish, Mesa Contemporary Arts Museum (Arizona, United States)
- 2017, UNstoppable, Urban Nation Museum for Urban Contemporary Art (Berlin, Germany)
- 2018, IMAGO, MUCA Museum of Urban and Contemporary Art (Munich, Germany)
- 2019, The Value of Sanctuary: Building a House Without Walls, Cathedral of St. John the Divine (New York, United States)
- 2019, Conquête Urbaine, Museum of Fine Arts (Calais, France)
- 2021, Beyond the streets on paper, Southampton Arts Center (New York, United States)
- 2022, Urbain.es, La Condition Publique (Roubaix, France)
