= 28th Busan International Film Festival =

2023 edition of film festival

- BIFF official poster
- Opening film: Because I Hate Korea by Jang Kun-jae
- Closing film: The Movie Emperor by Ning Hao
- Location: Busan Cinema Center
- Founded: 1995
- Awards: New Currents Award: Boli – The Wrestler by Iqbal Chowdhury, Bangladesh; September 1923 by Tatsuya Mori, Japan; KIM Jiseok Award: Paradise by Prasanna Vithanage, Sri Lankan-Indian co-production; Bride Abduction by Mirlan Abdikhalikov, Kyrgyzstan; Korean Film Achievement Award: Yoon Jeong-hee; The Asian Filmmaker of the Year: Chow Yun-fat
- Hosted by: Supported by: Ministry of Culture, Sports and Tourism; Metropolitan City of Busan; Korean Film Council
- No. of films: 269
- Festival date: Opening: October 4, 2023; Closing: October 13, 2023
- Website: BIFF 2023

Busan International Film Festival
- 29th 27th

The 28th Busan International Film Festival (Korean: 제28회 부산국제영화제) opened on October 4 at the Busan Cinema Center in Busan, South Korea. Song Kang-ho of Parasite fame welcomed filmmakers as host of the festival, while Park Eun-bin acted as the moderator of the ceremony, which was broadcast live on YouTube channel and Naver TV. Opening with South Korean film Because I Hate Korea by Jang Kun-jae, 269 films were screened, including 209 officially invited films from 69 countries and 60 community beef screenings. Jung Sung-il, South Korean film critic, director and screenwriter served as chairman of the jury for its main competition section.

BIFF this year opened special program, ‘Renaissance of Indonesian Cinema’ paying attention to Indonesia with 7 feature films and 5 short films, including a series to be released on Netflix. Chow Yun-fat, a Hong Kong star, received the Asian Filmmaker of the Year award, whereas Yoon Jeong-hee posthumously received the Korean Film Achievement Award.

BIFF closed on October 13 with Go Min-si and Hong Kyung acting as master of ceremonies, and the Chinese film industry satire The Movie Emperor by Ning Hao, screened as closing film.

The main award of the festival New Currents Award was given to Bangladeshi film Boli – The Wrestler by Iqbal H. Chowdhary, which follows an eccentric old fisherman who trains rigorously in a traditional form of wrestling; and Japanese film September 1923 by Tatsuya Mori, a historical feature marking 100 years of Great Kanto earthquake, which dramatises a massacre that followed the natural disaster.

== Overview ==
The film registration for the festival began in March 2023 with the closing date for submission fixed for July 19, 2023.

The poster for 28th edition of the festival was unveiled on August 15, 2023. Based on Shin Bong-cheol's To My Star, director Choi Soon-dae, who has been working as an art director since the 2nd Busan International Film Festival planned and designed it. The poster has a motif derived from the harmonious interaction of colorful colors and forms of light passing through a rotating prism. Which brings to mind light cast on a screen through a projector lens, and the beautifully blended light on a black background brings to mind a variety of films. It also symbolizes the Busan International Film Festival, full of dazzling light energy.

The line-up for Korean Cinema Today – Special Premiere and On Screen strands was unveiled on August 24. In the On Screen section, this year six world premieres – five from Korea and one from Indonesia are included. It also includes I Am a Running Mate, which marks the directorial debut of Han Jin-won, the co-writer for Bong Joon-ho’s Parasite. The Korean Cinema Today – Special Premiere section, this year includes two Netflix's films Believer 2, the sequel to Believer (2018), by Baek Jong-yul and Ballerina by Lee Chung-hyun. On August 30, the line-up of ten films each for New Currents competition along with Jiseok section were unveiled. New Currents is a section for first and second films by up-and-coming Asian filmmakers, whereas Jiseok section selects films from Asian directors with more than three feature films to their credit and honours two such directors with Jiseok awards. On September 1, 10 films for the section 'Korean Cinema Today - Vision Section' were announced. This year's selection has profound themes of life, agony, family affection, and personal introspection. On September 5, BIFF unveiled full line-up for its 2023 edition and announced Chow Yun-fat the winner of Asian Filmmaker of the Year award. The opening film of the festival was Jang Kun-jae’s Because I Hate Korea and closing film Ning Hao’s Chinese film industry satire The Movie Emperor.

The festival has started a new award for new Asian directors and independent film creators with LG Electronics, the LG OLED New Currents Award and the LG OLED Vision Award starting this year. These awards, will go to new directors who lead Asian films and Korean independent films with outstanding originality and vision, and receive a prize of ₩30 million and a plaque.

The eve event to wish the success of the festival was held on October 3, at the outdoor stage of BIFF Square in Jung-gu. It was attended by Busan Metropolitan City, Busan Jung-gu Office, and key guests of the festival. The event hosted by film actors Kim Hye-na and Lee Dong-gyu, had a celebratory performance by legendary diva Jung Hoon-hee, and singer-songwriter Juniel.

== Opening and closing ceremonies ==
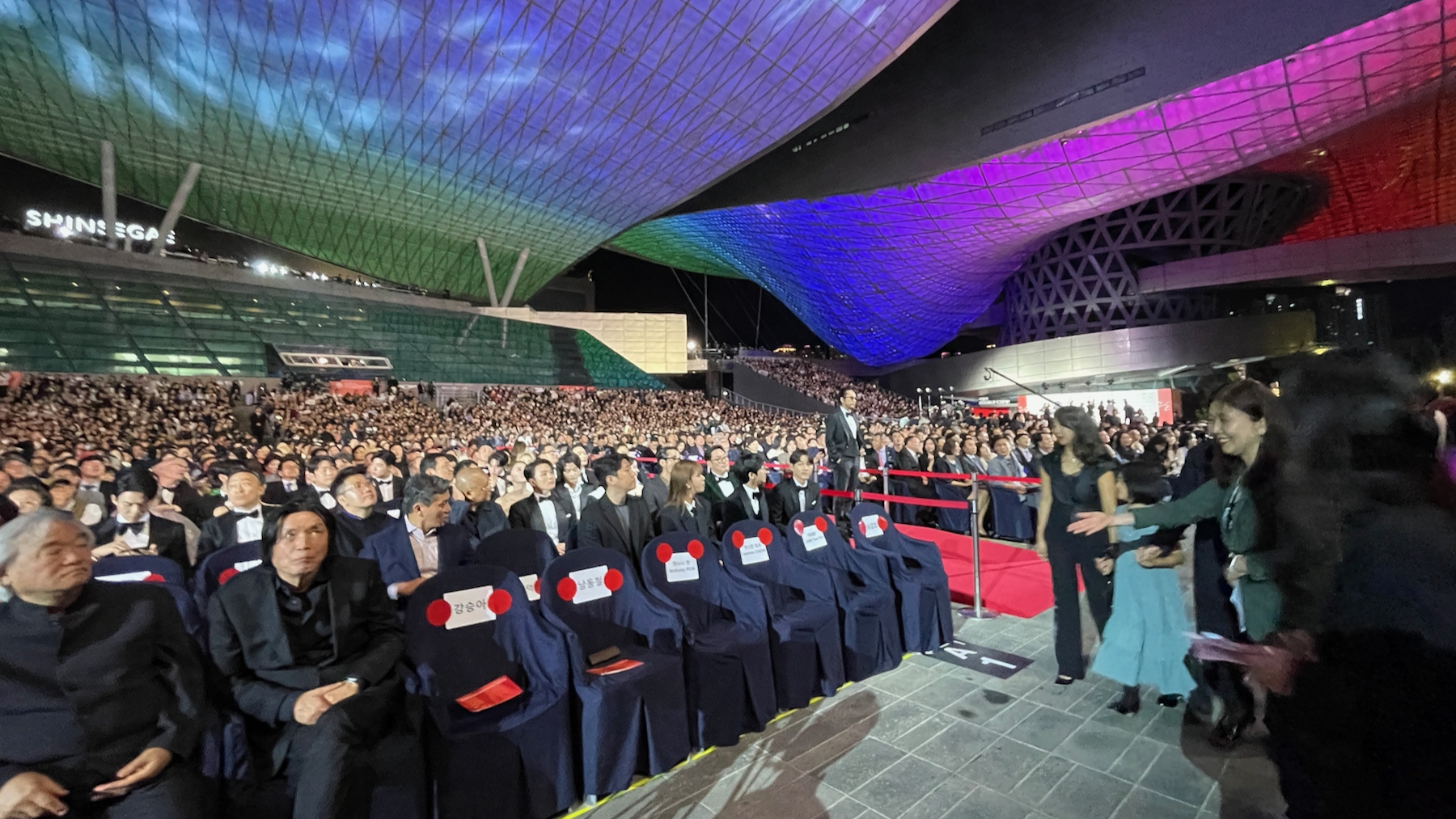
2023 Opening ceremony of the festival

Opening ceremony of the festival was held at Busan Cinema Center Outdoor Theater on October 4. It was broadcast live on the official YouTube channel of the festival and Naver TV.

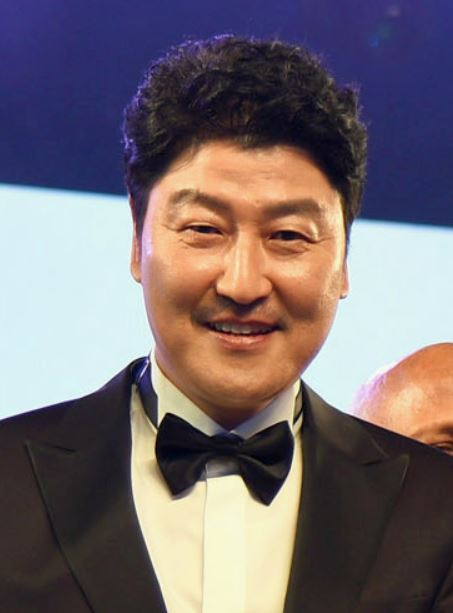
Song Kang-ho, host of the opening ceremony

Song Kang-ho of Parasite fame welcomed the guests at the opening ceremony, while Park Eun-bin acted as moderator.

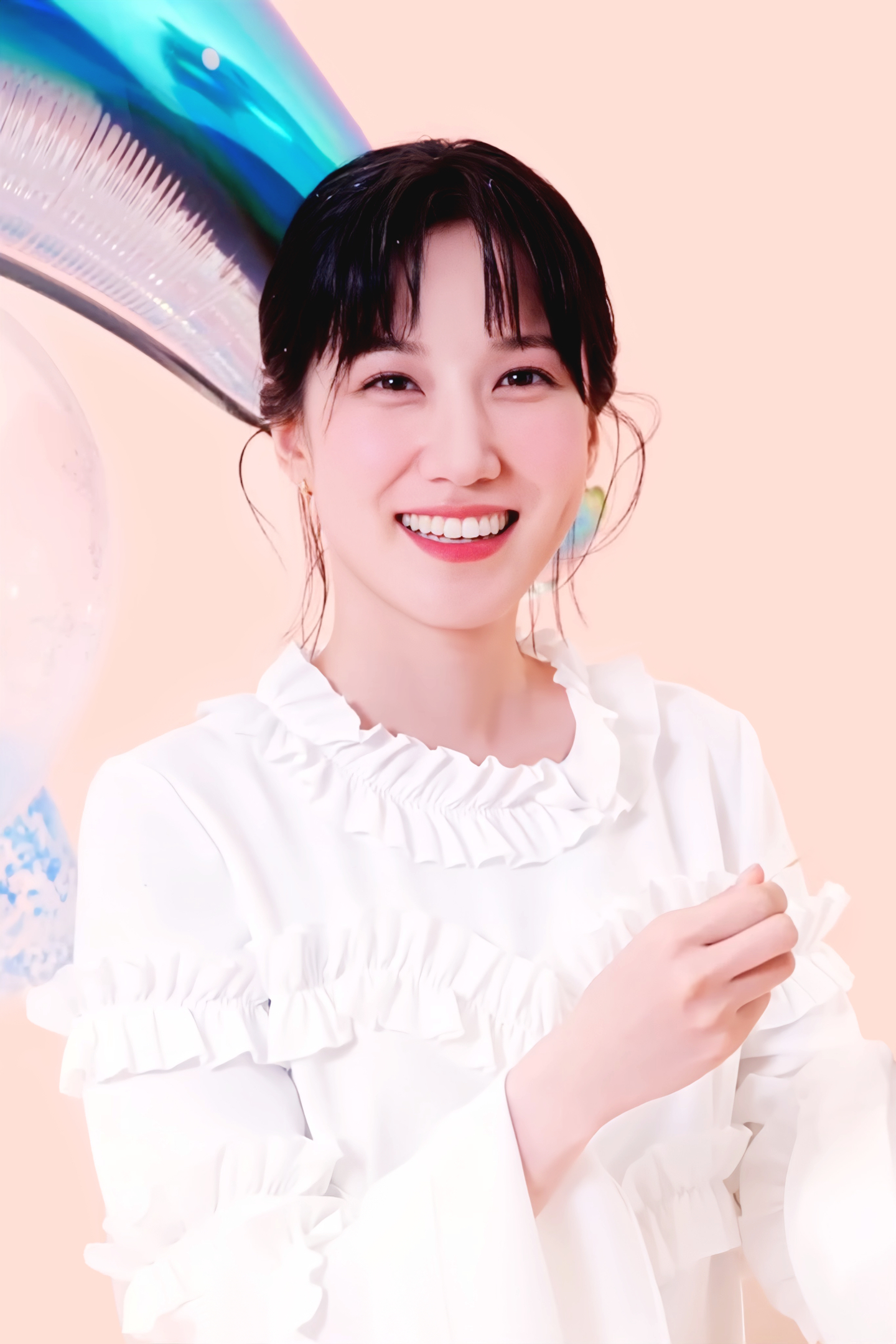
Park Eun-bin, Moderator of the opening ceremony

Busan Mayor Park Hyeong-jun, the Filmmaker of the Year awardee Hong Kong actor Chow Yun-fat, Japanese actress and model Suzu Hirose, Rie Miyazawa, Hana Sugisaki, Aina the End and Chinese star Fan Bingbing and South Korean actresses Jin Seo-yeon, Youn Yuh-jung, Im Soo-jung, Krystal Jung and Jeon So-nee attended the ceremony among others. The Korean Film Achievement Award went to the late actor Yoon Jeong-hee, and the Asian Film Actor Award went to Hong Kong actor Chow Yun-fat. The screening of films opened with the South Korean film Because I Hate Korea by Jang Kun-jae.

=== Closing ceremony ===
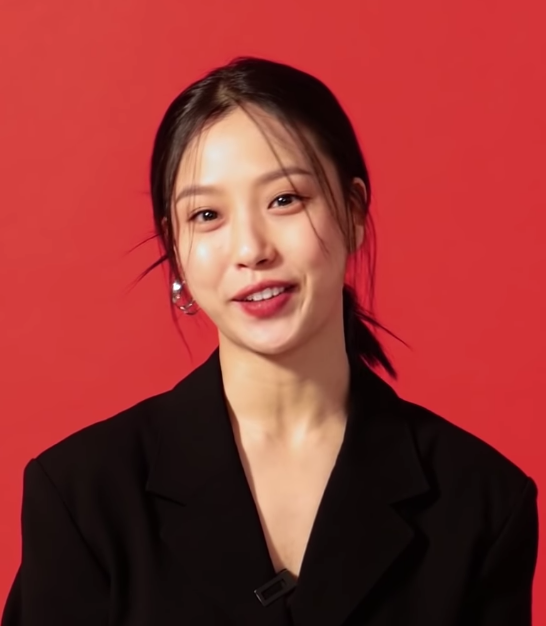
Go Min-si

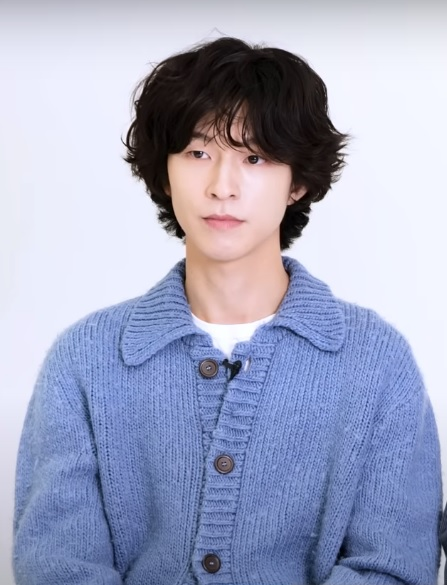
Hong Kyung

MCs of the closing ceremony

Closing ceremony was held at Busan Cinema Center Outdoor Theater on October 13, with Go Min-si and Hong Kyung acting as master of ceremonies. After the red carpet event, awards were announced, including the New Currents Award, Ji Seok Award, and Actor of the Year Awards. 142,432 people attended the film festival since the opening day with 82% audience share. 269 films from 70 countries were screened in 4 theaters and 25 screens, whereas 12 open talks, 11 outdoor stage greetings, 4 Actors House, 1 master class, 2 special talks, and 252 guest meetings were held during the 10 days of the festival. The festival closed with the screening of Chinese film industry satire The Movie Emperor by Ning Hao.

== Events ==
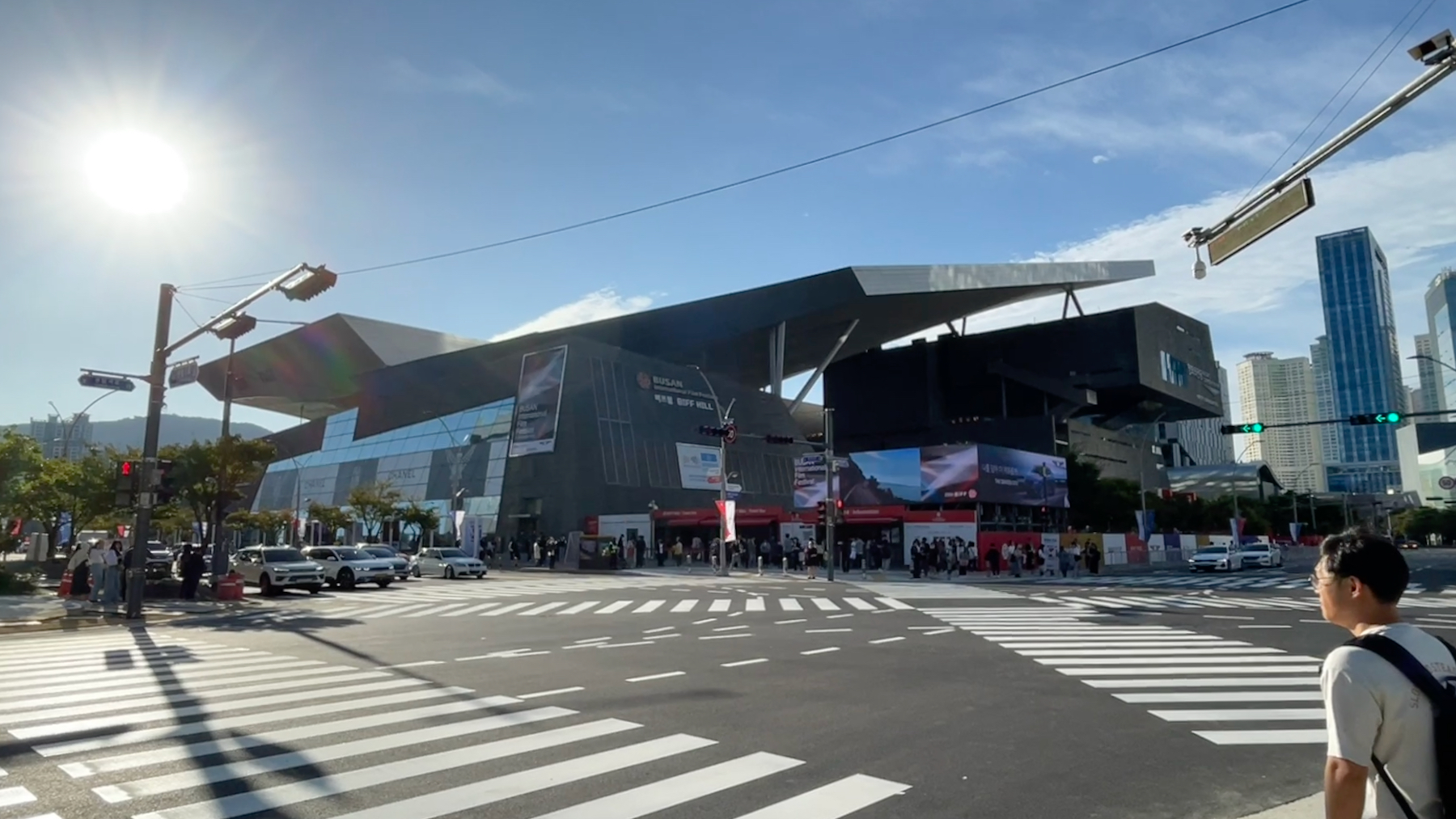
Busan Cinema Center, BIFF 2023

- Actors House: In this edition the following actors shared unknown behind-the-scenes stories and their future plans with the audience:
  - John Cho
  - Song Joong-ki
  - Youn Yuh-jung
  - Han Hyo-joo

Actors House will be held from October 5 to 7 at KNN Theater, 1st Basement Floor, KNN Tower.

- Master class: On October 9, Kazuo Hara, the Japanese documentary film director gave a lecture about his documentary perspective and world of work and had an in-depth conversation with the audience at KNN Theater, B1 – KNN Tower, Busan.
- Open Talk and Outdoor stage greetings: The open talk and outdoor stage greetings were held from October 5 to 7, on the BIFF X GENESIS outdoor stage. An audience participation program for all visitors to the festival, it was broadcast live online through Naver.
- Hand printing: Hand printing event was attended by Chow Yun-fat, winner of the 2023 Asian Film Maker of the Year Award. The event was held on October 5, after the open talk.
- Special talk: On October 10, after the screening of 2023 Japanese drama film Evil Does Not Exist, written and directed by Ryusuke Hamaguchi, a special talk was held at Busan Cinema Center, Middle Theater.
- 2023 Asia Contents Awards & Global OTT Awards: The awards ceremony to recognise the achievements of excellent content made for TV, OTT, and online across Asia, took place on October 8, 2023, at BIFF Theater, Busan Cinema Center, Busan, South Korea.

== Jury ==
=== New Currents Award ===
- Jung Sung-il, South Korean film critic, director and screenwriter, (Chairman of jury)
- Ava Cahen, French journalist, Cannes Film Festival Critics' Week Executive Committee Chairman
- Edwin, Indonesian film director, producer, and screenwriter
- Christina Oh, American film producer
- Han Jun-hee, South Korean film director and screenwriter

=== Kim Jiseok Award ===
- Martin Thérouanne, executive director of the Vesoul International Film Festival of Asian Cinema
- Miwa Nishikawa, Japanese director and screenwriter
- Lee Kwang-kuk, South Korean film director and screenwriter

=== BIFF Mecenat Award ===
- Kazuo Hara, Japanese documentary film director
- Kyung-soon, South Korean documentary films director
- Anke Rebeke, German film critic

=== Sonje Award ===
- Jang Kun-jae, South Korean film director, screenwriter and cinematographer
- Wei Shujun, Chinese screenwriter and filmmaker
- Bianca Balbuen, Filipino producer, and managing director of Anima, a studio affiliated with Chroma Entertainment

=== Lee Chun-yeon Film Impression Award ===
- Kang Je-gyu South Korean film director.
- Shim Jae-myeong, South Korean film producer, film planner, film marketer (CEO of Myung Film)
- Yoo Ji-tae, South Korean actor, film director and screenwriter
- Jeong Han-seok, Busan International Film Festival programmer.

=== KBS Independent Film Awards ===
- Kim Cho-hee, South Korean director
- Lee Jin-sook, South Korean producer
- Joo Seong-cheol, South Korean film critic

=== CGK Cinematography Award ===
- Lee Seon-yeong, South Korean cinematographer
- Yoon Ji-woon, South Korean cinematographer
- Lee Doo-man, South Korean cinematographer

=== Critic B Award ===
- Moon Hyung-seok, South Korean film critic
- Kim Pil-nam, South Korean film critic
- Koo Hyung-Jun, South Korean film critic, editor-in-chief of OTT criticism magazine BeOTT

=== FIPRESCI Award ===
- Gulbara Tolomushova, Kyrgyzstani film critic, film historian, TV director and TV Presenter..
- Sebastian Lindvall, Swedish curator and film critic
- Kim Hye-shin, South Korean film critic

=== NETPAC Award ===
- Mark Schilling, American film critic, journalist, translator, and author
- Song Eunji, South Korean programmer
- Sōzō Teruoka, Japanese film critic, director, screenwriter

=== LG OLED Vision Award ===
- Park In-je, South Korean director
- Jang Young-yeop, South Korean film reporter
- Hong Eun-mi, South Korean critic

=== Korean Film Directors Association Plus M Award Judge ===
- Park Yong-ji, a South Korean director
- Inan, South Korean director
- Lee Su-yeon, South Korean director

=== Actor of the Year Award ===
- Jung Woo, South Korean actor
- Han Yeri, South Korean actress

== Program sections ==
The festival has following sections:

- Gala Presentation
- Icons
- New Currents
- Jiseok
- A Window on Asian Cinema
- Korean Cinema Today - Panorama
- Korean Cinema Today Vision Section
- Korean Cinema Today - Special Premiere
- World Cinema
- Flash Forward
- Wide Angle
- Open Cinema
- Midnight Passion
- On Screen
- Special Program in Focus
  - Indonesian Cinema Renaissance
  - The True Colors of Chow Yun-Fat's Heroes
  - Korean American Special Exhibition: Korean Diaspora
  - Special Screening

=== Opening and closing films ===
Year	English title	Original title	Director(s)	Production countrie(s)
Opening film
2023	Because I Hate Korea	한국이 싫어서	Jang Kun-jae	South Korea
Closing film
2023	The Movie Emperor	红毯先生	Ning Hao	China

=== Gala Presentation ===
English title	Original title	Director(s)	Production countrie(s)
The Beast	La Bête	Bertrand Bonello	France
Green Night	綠夜	Han Shuai	Hong Kong, China
Monster	怪物	Koreeda Hirokazu	Japan

=== Icons ===
English title	Original title	Director(s)	Production countrie(s)
About Dry Grasses	Kuru Otlar Üstüne	Nuri Bilge Ceylan	Turkey, France, Germany
Anselm	Anselm – Das Rauschen der Zeit	Wim Wenders	Germany
Anatomy of a Fall	Anatomie d'une chute	Justine Triet	France
A Brighter Tomorrow	Il sol dell'avvenire	Nanni Moretti	Italy, France
The Book of Solutions	Le Livre des solutions	Michel Gondry	France
Close Your Eyes	Cerrar los ojos	Víctor Erice	Spain, Argentina
Do Not Expect Too Much from the End of the World	Nu aștepta prea mult de la sfârșitul lumii	Radu Jude	Romania, Luxembourg, France, Croatia
Elegies	詩	Ann Hui	Hong Kong
Essential Truths of the Lake		Lav Diaz	Philippines, France, Singapore, Portugal, Italy, Switzerland, United Kingdom
Eureka		Lisandro Alonso	France, Argentina, Germany, Portugal, Mexico
Evil Does Not Exist	悪は存在しない	Ryusuke Hamaguchi	Japan
Fallen Leaves	Kuolleet lehdet	Aki Kaurismäki	Finland
Green Border	Zielona granica	Agnieszka Holland	Poland, France, Czech Republic, Belgium
The Holdovers		Alexander Payne	United States
In Our Day	우리의 하루	Hong Sang-soo	South Korea
in Water	물 안에서	Hong Sang-soo	South Korea
Kidnapped	Rapito	Marco Bellocchio	Italy, France, Germany
The Killer		David Fincher	United States
La chimera		Alice Rohrwacher	Italy, France, Switzerland
Last Summer	L'Été dernier	Catherine Breillat	France
Menus-Plaisirs – Les Troisgros		Frederick Wiseman	France, United States
Music		Angela Schanelec	German, France, Serbia
The Old Oak		Ken Loach	United Kingdom, France, Belgium
On the Adamant	Sur l'Adamant	Nicolas Philibert	France, Japan
Pictures of Ghosts	Retratos Fantasmas	Kleber Mendonça Filho	Brazil
The Plough	Le grand chariot	Philippe Garrel	France, Switzerland
Poor Things		Yorgos Lanthimos	Ireland, United Kingdom, United States
The Pot-au-Feu	La Passion de Dodin Bouffant	Tran Anh Hung	France
The Shadowless Tower	白塔之光	Zhang Lü	China
Youth (Spring)	青春	Wang Bing	China, France, Luxembourg, Netherlands

=== New Currents ===
The selected titles are eligible for multiple awards, including the New Currents Award, the FIPRESCI Award, the NETPAC Award, and the KB New Currents Audience Award.

Highlighted title indicates award winner

English title	Original title	Director(s)	Production countrie(s)
After a Fever		Akira Yamamoto	Japan
Borrowed Time		Choi Ji	China
Heritage	부모 바보	Lee Jong-soo	South Korea
Now, Oasis		Chia Chee Sum	Malaysia
September 1923	福田村事件	Tatsuya Mori	Japan
Solid by the Sea		Patiparn Buntharik	Thailand
Spark		Rajesh Zala	India
Stranger	Agantuk	Biplop Sarkar	Bangladesh
That Summer Lie	그 여름날의 거짓말	Son Hyeon-rok	South Korea
Boli – The Wrestler	বলী	Iqbal H. Chowdhury	Bangladesh

=== Jiseok ===
This section selected films from Asian directors with a portfolio of more than three feature films, and from the line-up of ten films, two were honored with Jiseok awards.

Highlighted title indicates award winner

English title	Original title	Director(s)	Production countrie(s)
24 Hours with Gaspar	24 Jam Bersama Gaspar	Yosep Anggi Noen	Indonesia
At the end of this film	이 영화의 끝에서	Ahn Seon-kyung	South Korea
Blesser	그녀에게	Lee Sang-cheol	South Korea
Bride Abduction		Mirlan Abdikhalikov	Kyrgyzstan
Doi Boy		Nontawat Numbenchapol	Thailand
Ichiko	市子	Akihiro Toda	Japan
Moro		Brillante Mendoza	Philippines
Paradise		Prasanna Vithanage	Sri Lanka, India
Something Like an Autobiography		Mostofa Sarwar Farooki	Bangladesh
The Moon	月	Yuya Ishii	Japan

=== A Window on Asian Cinema ===
English title	Original title	Director(s)	Production countrie(s)
Agra		Kanu Behl	India
Ali Topan		Sidharta Tata	Indonesia
Beyond The Fog	Kiri No Fuchi	Daichi Murase	Japan
A Boy and a Girl		Li-da Hsu	Taiwan
City of Wind	Сэр сэр салхи	Lkhagvadulam Purev-Ochir	France, Mongolia, Portugal, Netherlands, Germany, Qatar
Critical Zone	Mantagheye bohrani	Ali Ahmadzadeh	Iran, Germany
Following the Sound	彼方のうた	Kyoshi Sugita	Japan
Guras		Saurabh Ray	India, Nepal
If Only I Could Hibernate		Zoljargal Purevdash	Mongolia, France, Switzerland, Qatar
In Flames		Zarrar Kahn	Canada, Pakistan
Inshallah a Boy		Amjad Al Rasheed	Jordan, Saudi Arabia, Qatar, France
Inside the Yellow Cocoon Shell	Bên trong vỏ kén vàng	Pham Thien An	Vietnam, Singapore, France, Spain
Joram		Devashish Makhija	India
Kyrie	キリエのうた	Shunji Iwai	Japan
The Monk and the Gun		Pawo Choyning Dorji	Bhutan, France, United States, Taiwan
Morrison		Phuttiphong Aroonpheng	France, Thailand,
One Second Ahead, One Second Behind	1秒先の彼	Nobuhiro Yamashita	Japan
Only the River Flows	河边的错误	Wei Shujun	China
Rapture	Rimdogittanga	Dominic Sangma	India, China, Switzerland, Netherlands, Qatar
Remembering Every Night	Subete no Yoru wo Omoidasu	Yui Kiyohara	Japan
Ripples	波紋	Naoko Ogigami	Japan
A Road to a Village	गाउ आएको बाटो	Nabin Subba	Nepal
Salli		Lien Chien Hong	Taiwan, France
Sara		Ismail Basbeth	Indonesia
The Scavenger of Dreams		Suman Ghosh	India
Scream	Айқай	Kensebek Shaikakov	Kazakhstan
A Song Sung Blue	小白船	Geng Zihan	China
Ten Years Myanmar		Thaiddhi, Nay Wunn Ni, Myo Thar Khin, Aung Min	Myanmar
Whispering Mountains	රහස් කියන කඳු	Jagath Manuwarna	Sri Lanka
Women from Rote Island		Jeremias Nyangoen	Indonesia

=== Korean Cinema Today - Panorama ===
English title	Original title	Director(s)
Honey Sweet	달짝지근해: 7510	Lee Han
It's Okay!	괜찮아 괜찮아 괜찮아!	Kim Hye-young
A Man of Reason	보호자	Jung Woo-sung
Ms. Apocalypse	세기말의 사랑	Lim Sun-ae
Picnic	소풍	Kim Yong-gyun
Ransomed	비공식작전	Kim Seong-hoon
Soul Mate	소울메이트	Min Yong-geun

=== Korean Cinema Today - Vision Section ===
This year 10 films were showcased as world premiere.

English title	Original title	Director(s)
The Berefts	한 채	Jung Beom and Heo Jang
Concerning My Daughter	딸에 대하여	Lee Mi-rang
Delivery	딜리버리	Jang Min-joon
FAQ	막걸리가 알려줄거야	Kim Da-min
The Guest	301호 모텔 살인 사건	Yeon Je-gwang
House of the Seasons	장손	Oh Jung-min
Isle of Snakes	바얌섬	Kim Yoo-min
Last Summer	지난 여름	Choi Seung-woo
Sorigouldari: The Sound Underpass	소리굴다리	Gupasu Ryun-hoi
Work to Do	해야 할 일	Park Hong-joon

=== Korean Cinema Today - Special Premiere ===
English title	Original title	Director(s)
Believer 2	독전 2	Baek Jong-yul
Ballerina	발레리나	Lee Choong-hyun
Hopeless	화란	Kim Chang-hoon

=== World Cinema ===
English title	Original title	Director(s)	Production countrie(s)
Adagio		Stefano Sollima	Italy
Alemania		María Zanetti	Argentina, Spain
Behind the Mountains	Oura el jbel	Mohamed Ben Attia	Tunisia, Belgium, France, Italy, Saudi Arabia, Qatar
Blaga's Lessons	Urotcite na Blaga	Stefan Komanderev	Bulgaria, Germany
Blackbird Blackbird Blackberry		Elene Naveriani	Switzerland, Germany, Georgia
Club Zero		Jessica Hausner	Austria, Denmark, France, Germany, United Kingdom
The Delinquents	Los Delincuentes	Rodrigo Moreno	Argentina, Brazil, Chile, Luxembourg
Explanation for Everything	Magyarázat mindenre	Gábor Reisz	Hungary, Slovakia
Finally Dawn	Finalmente l'alba	Saverio Costanzo	Italy
The Goldman Case	Le Procès Goldman	Cédric Kahn	France
Here		Bas Devos	Belgium
Holly		Fien Troch	Belgium, Netherlands, Luxembourg, France
Housekeeping for Beginners		Goran Stolevski	Poland, Serbia, Australia, Croatia, Kosovo, North Macedonia, United States
The King Tide		Christian Sparkes	Canada
Last Night of Amore	L'ultima notte di Amore	Andrea Di Stefano	Italy
Marguerite's Theorem	Le Théorème de Marguerite	Anna Novion	France, Switzerland
Myself, Jerry		Law Chen	United States
The Promised Land	Bastarden	Nikolaj Arcel	Denmark, Germany, Sweden
Red Rooms	Les Chambres rouges	Pascal Plante	Canada
The Teachers' Lounge	Das Lehrerzimmer	İlker Çatak	Germany
Vincent Must Die	Vincent doit mourir	Stéphan Castang	France, Belgium
Woman Of...	Kobieta z...	Malgorzata Szumowska, Michał Englert	Poland, Sweden

=== Flash Forward ===
A competition among non-Asian filmmakers’ first or second features that take an innovative and original approach to cinema. The winner is decided by the audience and awarded the Flash Forward Award.

English title	Original title	Director(s)	Production countrie(s)
An Endless Sunday	Una Sterminata Domenica	Alain Parroni	Italy, Ireland, Germany
The Dreamer	L'homme d'argile	Anaïs Tellenne	France
How to Have Sex		Molly Manning Walker	United Kingdom
The Peasants		DK Welchman, Hugh Welchman	Poland, Serbia, Lithuania
The Rye Horn	O Corno	Jaione Camborda	Spain, Portugal, Belgium
Shayda		Noora Niasari	Australia
Upon Open Sky	A cielo abierto	Mariana Arriaga, Santiago Arriaga	Mexico, Spain
The Vanishing Soldier	החייל הנעלם	Dani Rosenberg	Israel

=== Wide Angle ===
==== Korean Short Film Competition ====
Highlighted title indicates award winner

English title	Original title	Director(s)
Christmas in Summer	8월의 크리스마스	Lee Ga-hong
She Wants True Love	덕희는 ㅇㅇ이 있다	Yeom On
MYDEAR	마이디어	Jeon Do-hee and Kim So-hee
Fisher Boy	물고기 소년	Nam Dong-hyun
Sally	샐리	Lee Jeong-joo
KARMA	업보	Choi Soo-hyuk
New Morning of an Artificial World	인공 세상의 새로운 아침	Song Jin-wook
Flavor of Sisterhood	자매의 맛	Hwang In-won
Three Questions That Lead to Love	초면에 발생한 분쟁을 조정하는 세 가지 질문	Ko Eun-grace
Home	홈	Lee Hye-bin

==== Asian Short Film Competition ====
Highlighted title indicates award winner

English title	Original title	Director(s)	Production country(s)
21 weeks later		Nasreen Mohammadpur	Iran
Reclaim My Summer		Chen Haowei	Taiwan
Everybody's Gotta Love Sometimes		Sain Ryan Toon	France, Myanmar, Indonesia
Roller Coaster		Chen Xinyan, Zhang Jingchen	China
The Rootless Bloom		Rein Maychaelson	Indonesia
Lamb Lamb Lamb		Song Dongxu	China
Headless Horsemen		Ovsanna Gevorgyan	Armenia, Serbia
The Witness Tree		Niranjan Raj Bhetwal	Nepal

==== Documentary Competition ====
Highlighted title indicates award winner

English title	Original title	Director(s)	Production country(s)
The Daughters of That Day	그날의 딸들	Koh Hoon	South Korea
Flickering Lights		Anupama Srinivasan, Anirban Dutta	India
The Voices of the Silenced	되살아나는 목소리	Park Ma-ui, Park Soo-nam	South Korea, Japan
Rather be Ashes Than Dust		Alan Lau	Hong Kong, China, Canada, United Kingdom
The Night of the Factory Girls	여공의 밤	Kim Geon-hee	South Korea
An Owl, A Garden & The Writer		Sara Dolatabadi	France, Switzerland, Iran
Republic		Jin Jiang	Singapore, China
SHOW ME THE JUSTICE	청년정치백서-쇼미더저스티스	Lee Il-ha	South Korea

==== Documentary Showcase ====
Dear Jinri capturing the late K-pop star Sulli’s final interview is included in this year's selection.

English title	Original title	Director(s)	Production countrie(s)
Against the Tide		Sarvnik Kaur	India, France
And the King Said, What a Fantastic Match...		Axel Danielson, Maximilien Van Aertryck	Sweden, Denmark
Beyond Utopia		Madeleine Gavin	United States
Dear Jinri	진리에게	Jung Yoon-suk	South Korea
Four Daughters	بنات ألفة	Kaouther Ben Hania	France, Tunisia, Germany, Saudi Arabia
Kiss the Future		Nenad Cicin-Sain	United States, Bosnia and Herzegovina, Ireland, United Kingdom
Kiarostami at Work		Seifollah Samadian	Iran
The List		Hana Makhmalbaf	United Kingdom, Afghanistan, Iran
The Mother of All Lies		Asmae El Moudir	Morocco, Egypt, Saudi Arabia, Qatar
Promise	약속	Min Byung-hun	South Korea
Talking with Rivers		Mohsen Makhmalbaf	Iran, United Kingdom
Watercolors	워터컬러스	Lee In-hoon, Kim Nam-suk, Kim Hyun-soo	South Korea
Yellow Door: ′90s Lo-fi Film Club	노란문: 세기말 시네필 다이어리	Lee Hyuk-rae	South Korea

=== Open Cinema ===
A collection of new films, screened at the hallmark outdoor theater.

English title	Original title	Director(s)	Production countrie(s)
The Animal Kingdom	Le Règne animal	Thomas Cailley	France
Rocky Aur Rani Kii Prem Kahaani		Karan Johar	India
Dogman		Luc Besson	France
One More Chance	別叫我“賭神"	Anthony Pun	Hong Kong
Revolver Lily	リボルバー・リリー	Isao Yukisada	Japan

=== Midnight Passion ===
A collection of thrillers, horror and action films.

English title	Original title	Director(s)	Production countrie(s)
Deadland		Lance Larson	United States
Raging Grace		Paris Zarcilla	United Kingdom
Birth/Rebirth		Laura Moss	United States
Pathum		Juan Galignanes	Spain

=== On Screen ===
In this section 5 Korean and 1 Indonesian works will be released for the first time in the world.

English title	Original title	Director(s)	Production countrie(s)	Platform / Network
Cigarette Girl	Gadis Kretek	Kamila Andini, Ifa Isfansyah	Indonesia	Netflix
A Bloody Lucky Day	운수 오진 날	Pil Gam-seong	South Korea	TVING
LTNS		Lim Dae-hyung, Jeon Go-woon	South Korea	TVING
Running Mate	러닝메이트	Han Jin-won	South Korea	TVING
The Deal	거래	Lee Jung-Gon	South Korea	Wavve
Vigilante	비질란테	Choi Jeong-yeol	South Korea	Disney+

== Special program in focus ==
=== Indonesian Cinema Renaissance ===
The festival screened the works of notable female directors Mouly Surya and Kamila Andini, horror director Joko Anwar, directors Edwin and Yosep Anggi Noen and the works of noteworthy new directors.

Year	English title	Original title	Director(s)	Genre
2023	24 Hours with Gaspar	24 Jam Bersama Gaspar	Yosep Anggi Noen	Drama
2023	Cigarette Girl	Gadis Kretek	Kamila Andini, Ifa Isfansyah	Drama, Romance TV Series
2016	Tales of the Otherwords	Ziarah	B. W. Purbanegara	Drama
2017	Posesif		Edwin	Psychological drama
2022	The Passion of Sarah		Ismail Basbeth	Drama
2013	What They Don't Talk About When They Talk About Love	Yang Tidak Dibicarakan Ketika Membicarakan Cinta	Mouly Surya	Drama
2019	Impetigore	Perempuan Tanah Jahanam	Joko Anwar	Horror
2023	Basri & Salma in a Never-Ending Comedy	Basri & Salma Dalam Komedi Yang Terus Berputar	Khozy Rizal	Short film
2022	Dancing Colors		M. Reza Fahriansyah	Short film
2021	The Sea Calls For Me	Laut Memanggilku	Tumpal Tampubolon	Short film
2022	Vania on Lima Street		Bayu Prihantoro Filemon	Short film
2023	Where the Wild Frangipanis Grow		Nirartha Bas Diwangkara	Short film

=== The True Colors of Chow Yun-Fat's Heroes ===
Year	English title	Original title	Director(s)	Country of origin
2023	One More Chance	別叫我“賭神"	Anthony Pun	Hong Kong
2000	Crouching Tiger, Hidden Dragon	卧虎藏龙	Ang Lee	China, Taiwan, Hong Kong, United States
1986	A Better Tomorrow	英雄本色	John Woo	Hong Kong

=== Korean American Special Exhibition: Korean Diaspora ===
Steven Yeun, John Cho, director Lee Isaac Chung and director Justin Chon attended the festival.

Year	English title	Original title	Director(s)	Country of origin
2018	Burning	버닝	Lee Chang-dong	South Korea, Japan
2017	Columbus		Kogonada	United States
2023	Jamojaya	자모자야	Justin Chon	United States
2020	Minari	미나리	Lee Isaac Chung	United States
2023	Past Lives		Celine Song	United States
2018	Searching		Aneesh Chaganty	United States

=== Special Screening ===
This year to commemorate the late actor Yoon Jeong-hee, who died in 2023, a special screening of her masterpieces were held. In addition, Ryuichi Sakamoto: Opus, which contains performance scenes of the late Ryuichi Sakamoto, who died in March, were also screened.

Year	English title	Original title	Director(s)
2010	Poetry	시	Lee Chang-dong
1967	Mist	안개	Kim Soo-yong
2023	Ryuichi Sakamoto: Opus		Neo Sora

== Awards and winners ==
Image	Recipient	Country	Ref.
The Asian Filmmaker of the Year
	Chow Yun-fat	Hong Kong	
Korean Film Achievement Award
	Yoon Jeong-hee	South Korea	

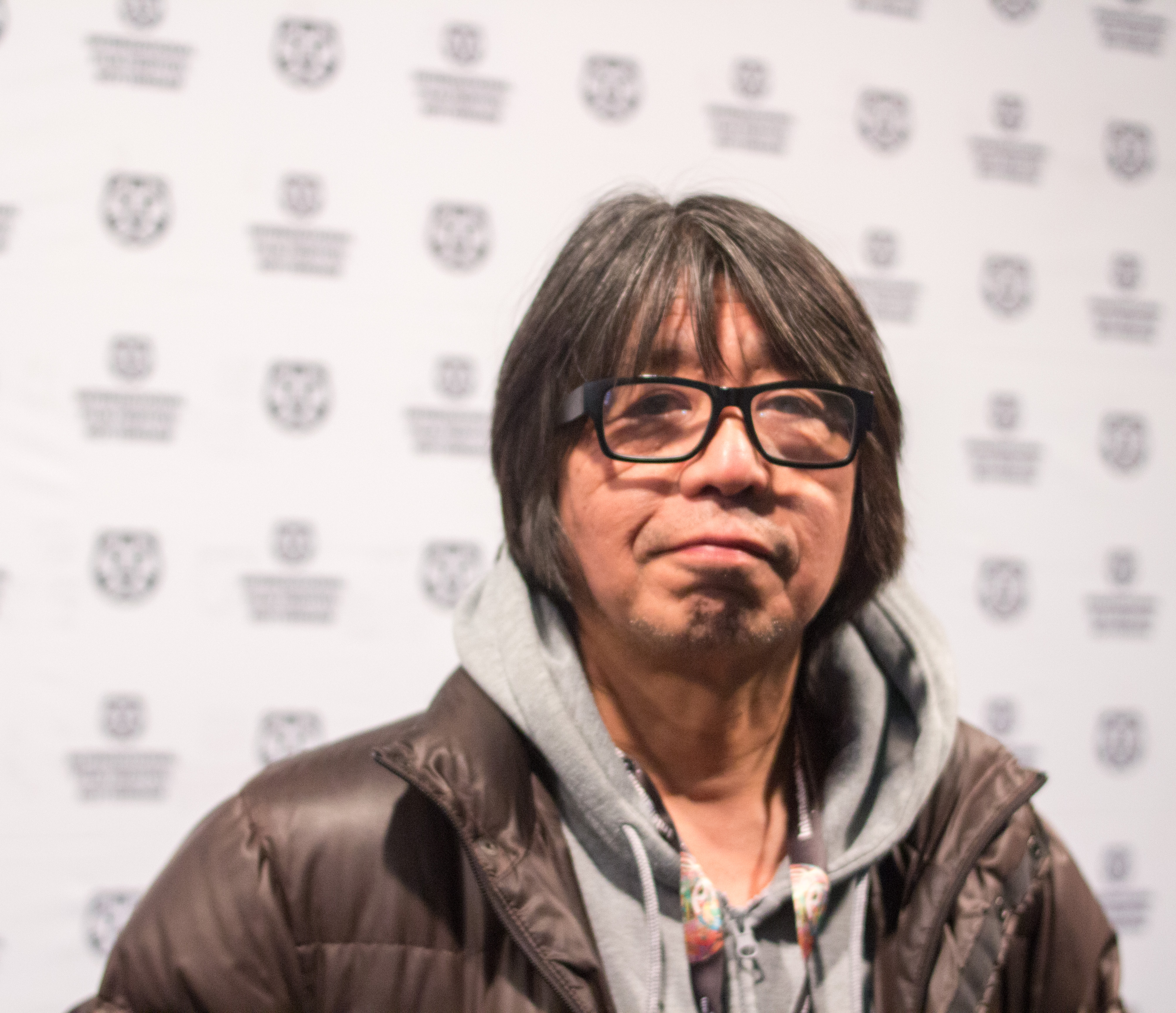
Tatsuya Mori, 2023 New Currents Award winner for September 1923

- New Currents Award:
  - Boli – The Wrestler by Iqbal Chowdhury, Bangladesh
  - September 1923 by Tatsuya Mori, Japan
- KIM Jiseok Award:
  - Paradise by Prasanna Vithanage, Sri Lankan-Indian co-production
  - Bride Abduction by Mirlan Abdikhalikov, Kyrgyzstan
- Sonje Award:
  - Mydear by Jeon Do-hee and Kim So-hee, South Korea
  - 21 weeks later by Nasreen Mohammadpur, Iran
- BIFF Mecenat Award
  - Republic by Jin Jiang, Singapore, China
  - The Voices of the Silenced by Park Ma-ui, Park Soo-nam, South Korea, Japan
- Actors of the Year:
  - Jang Seong-beom, Work to Do, Actor, South Korea
  - Oh Min-ae, Concerning My Daughter, Actress, South Korea
- KB New Currents Audience Award:
  - Heritage by Lee Jong-soo, South Korea
- Flash Forward Audience Award:
  - The Dreamer by Anaïs Tellenne, France
- FIPRESCI Award: (Note: The FIPRESCI Award is given to the most exceptional film that reflects the creator’s experimental and progressive spirit, among those presented in the New Currents section.)
  - That Summer Lie by Sohn Hyun-lok
- NETPAC Award: (Note: The NETPAC Award is given to the best film selected by the NETPAC jury among the films screened in the New Currents section. NETPAC is an international organization founded in 1990, and is devoted to the expansion of Asian film distribution and screening.)
  - Solids by the Sea by Patiparn Buntharik
- LG OLED New Currents Award:
  - Solids by the Sea' by Patiparn Buntharik
- LG OLED Vision Award:
  - The Berefts by Jung Beom, Heo Jang
- DGK Plus M Award (joint winners): (Note: The DGK Plus M Award goes to two Korean films from the Korean Cinema Today – Vision section. Each winner will be granted ₩5 million. This cash prize is sponsored by the Directors Guild of Korea and Plus M.)
  - Work to Do by Park Hong-joon
  - Isle of Snakes by Kim Yoo-min
- CGV Award: (Note: The CGV Award was created to spotlight innovative films that present a new vision of Korean cinema from the Korean Cinema Today – Vision section. The winner receives a cash prize of ₩10 million sponsored by CJ CGV.)
  - Concerning My Daughter' by Lee Mi-rang
- KBS Independent Film Award: (Note: The KBS Independent Film Award is given to support Korean independent films. One Korean film was selected from the Korean Cinema Today – Vision and New Currents sections to receive ₩10 million sponsored by KBS.)
  - House of the Seasons by Oh Jung-min
- CGK Award:
  - House of the Seasons, Lee Jin-keun, Cinematographer
- Critic b Award:
  - Last Summer by Choi Seung-woo
- Aurora Media Award (joint winners):
  - House of the Seasons by Oh Jung-min
  - FAQ by Kim Da-min
- Watcha Short Award (joint winners):
  - Mydear by Jeon Do-hee and Kim So-hee
  - Karma by Choi Soo-hyuk
- Citizen Critics’ Award:
  - The Berefts by Jung Beom, Heo Jang
- Busan Cinephile Award:
  - Yellow Door: ′90s Lo-fi Film Club by Lee Hyuk-rae
- The Choon-yun Award
  - Kim Ji-yeon, producer, South Korea
