= New Currents =

Section of Busan International Film Festival

- Awarded for: Best first or second feature films by Asian directors
- Country: South Korea
- Presented by: Busan International Film Festival
- First award: 1996
- Final award: 2024
- Currently held by: The Land of Morning Calm by Park Yi-woong, South Korea; Ma – Cry of Silence by The Maw Nang, Myanmar, South Korea, Singapore, France, Norway, Qatar
- Website: biff.kr

New Currents is a competitive section of Busan International Film Festival's official selection. The section was introduced at the festival's inaugural edition, in 1996.

It showcases the first or second feature films by up-and-coming Asian directors. The two winning directors are awarded each a prize of US$30,000.

From 2025 'The New Currents' section was merged into the newly created Competition and Vision sections, the festival retained the New Currents Award, recognizing a debut feature by a first-time filmmaker chosen from entries in the Competition and Vision categories. A dedicated jury oversees the selection for this award.

== Selection ==
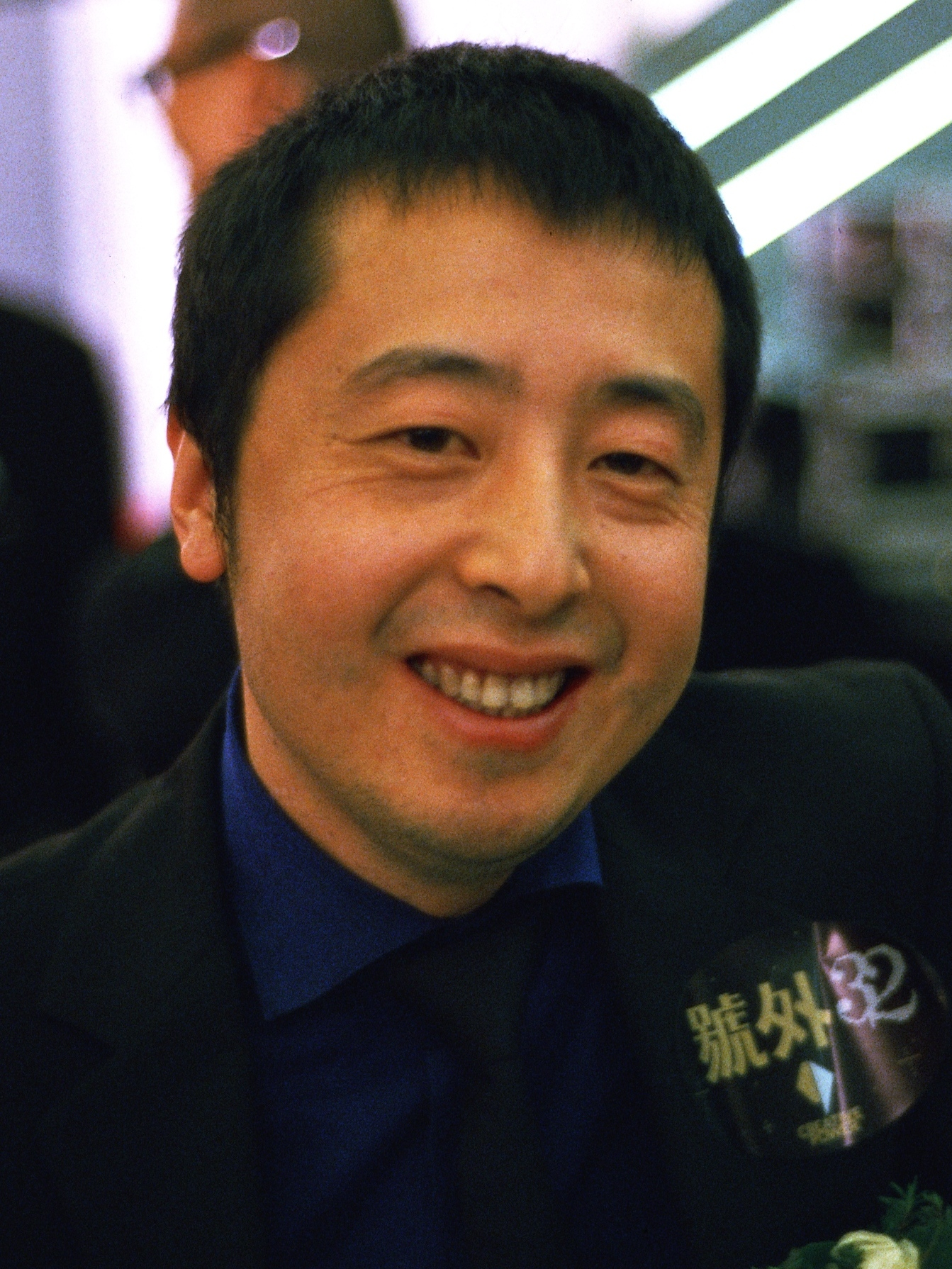
Jia Zhangke, 1998 winner

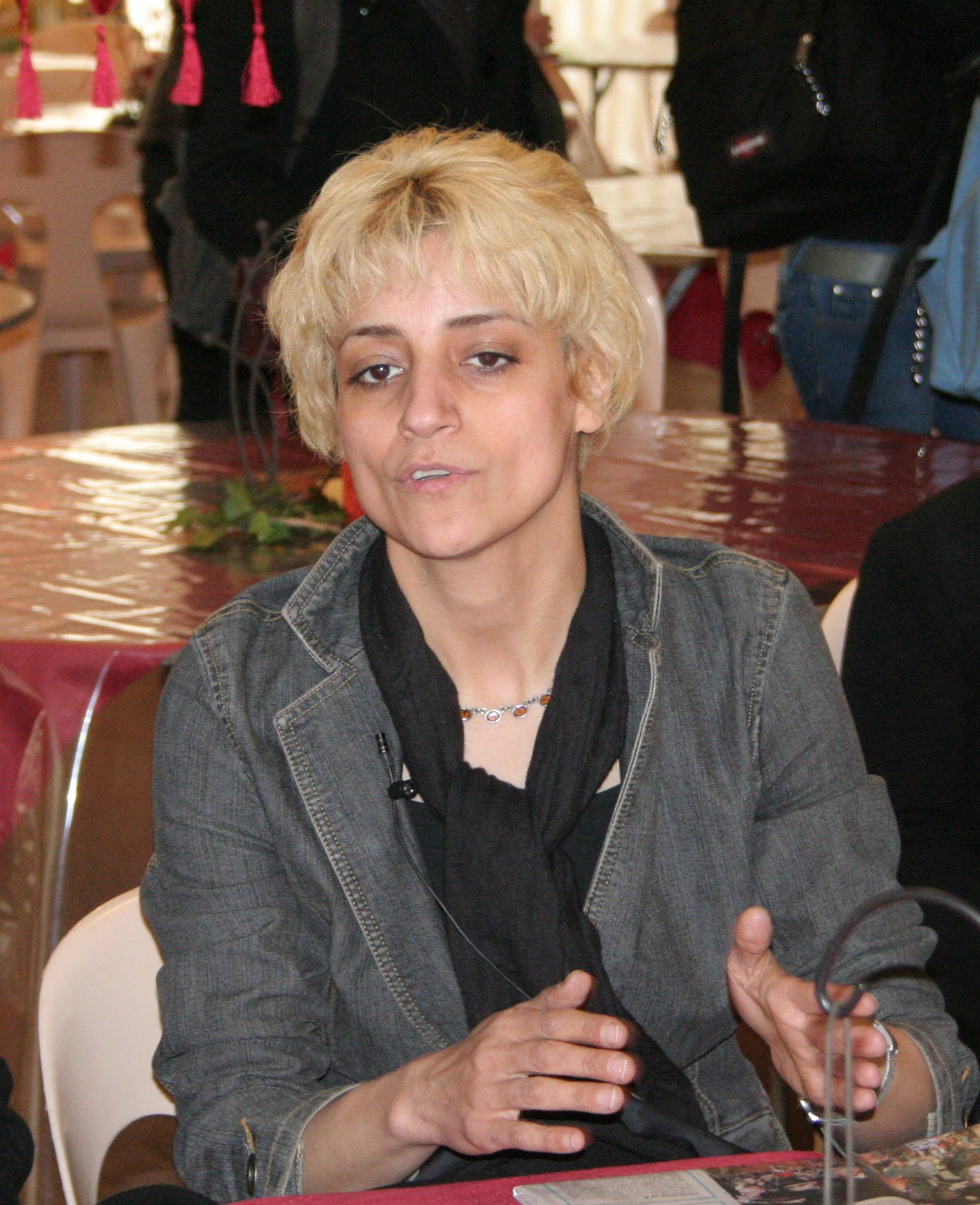
Marzieh Meshkini, 2000 winner

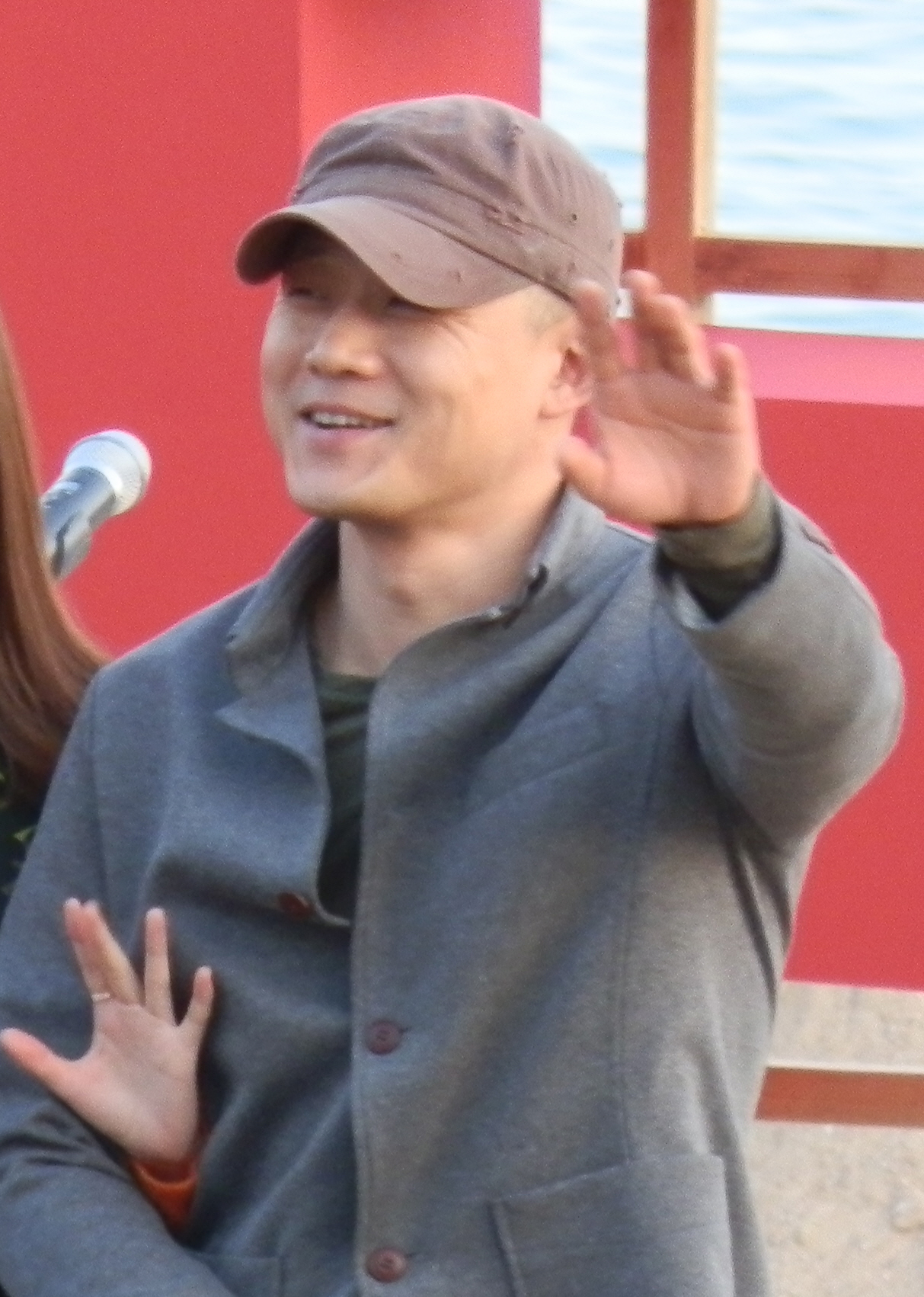
Song Il-gon, 2001 winner

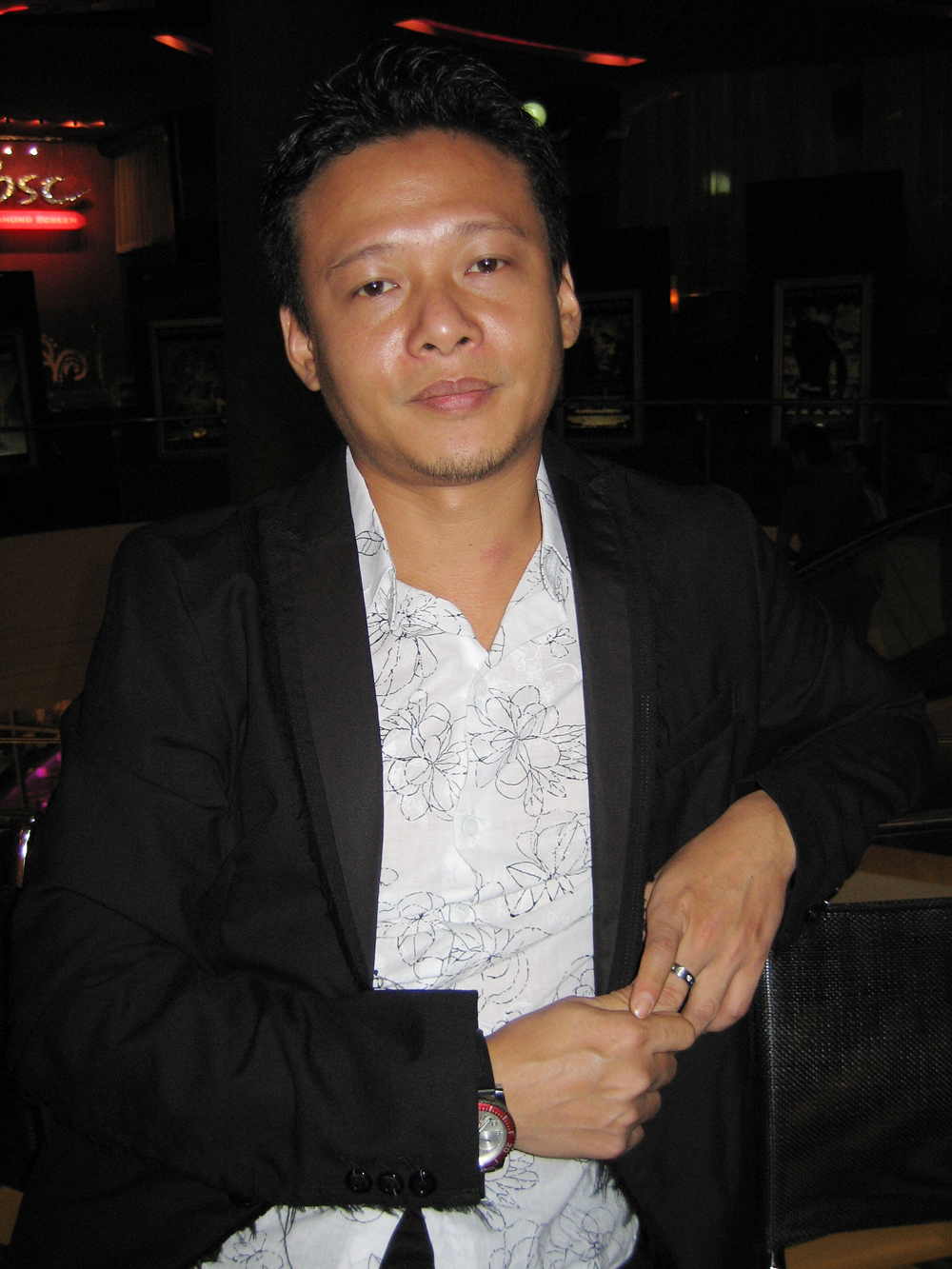
Lee Kang-sheng, 2003 co-winner

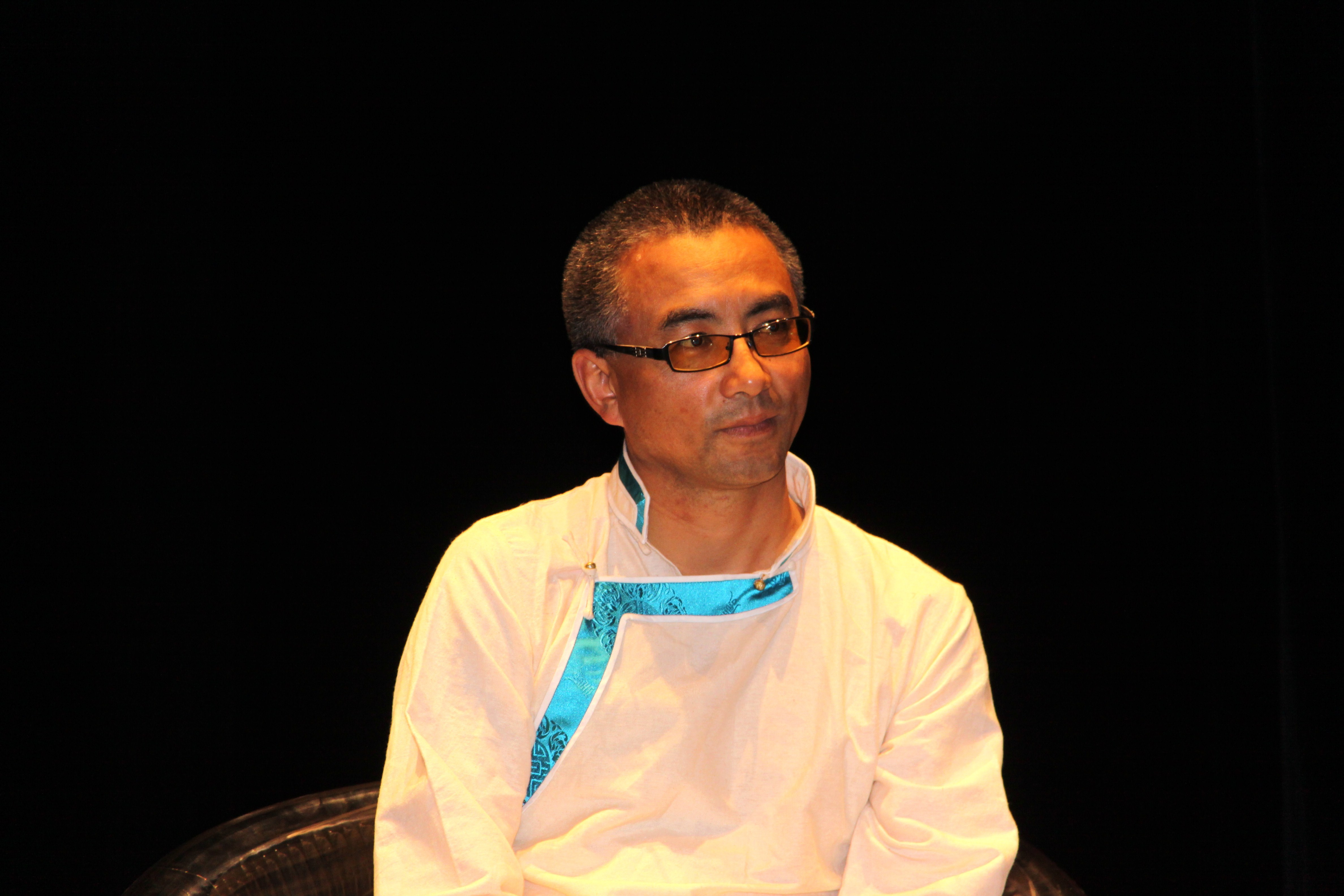
Wanma Caidan, 2005 Special Mention winner

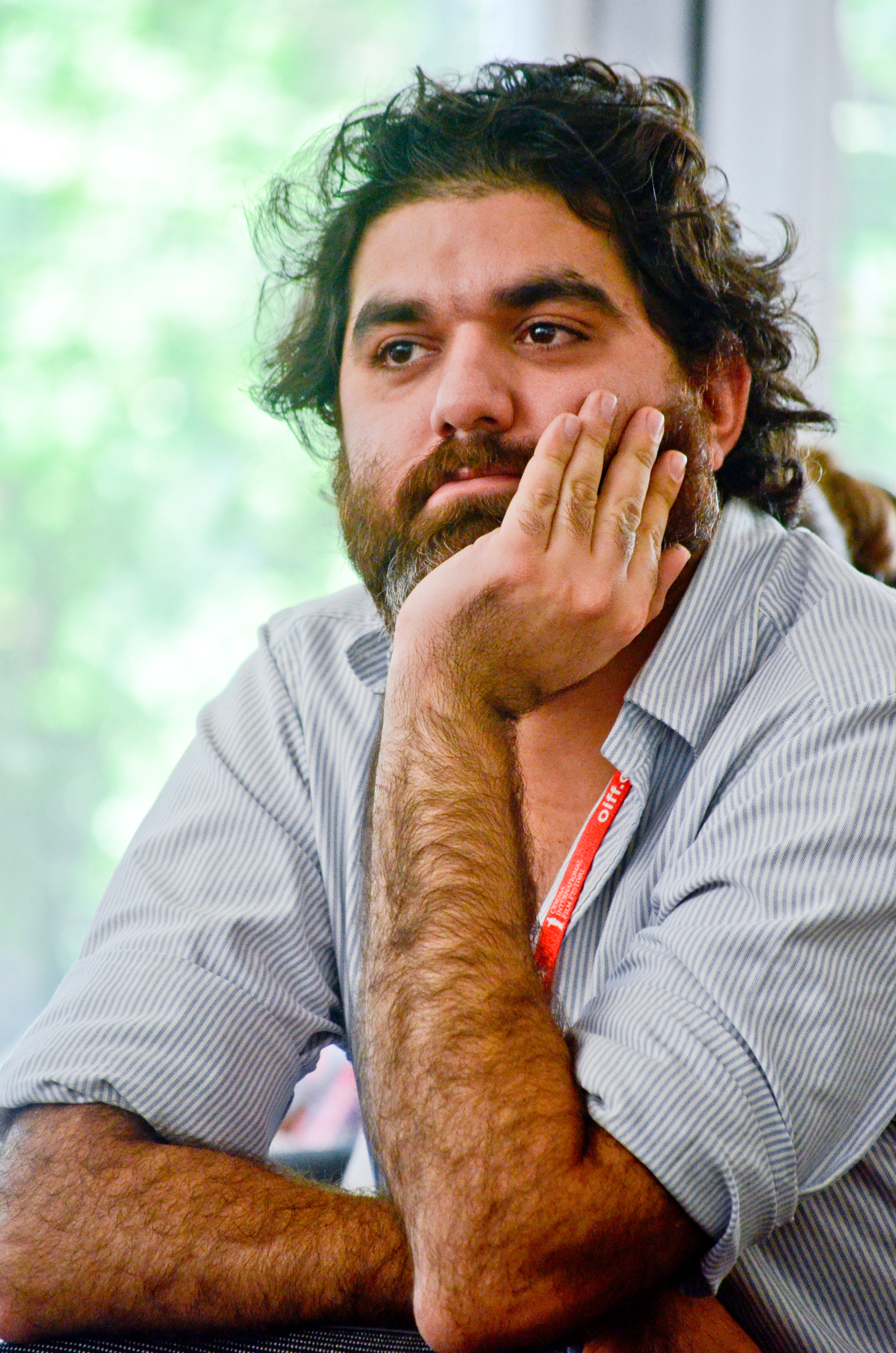
Morteza Farshbaf, 2011 co-winner

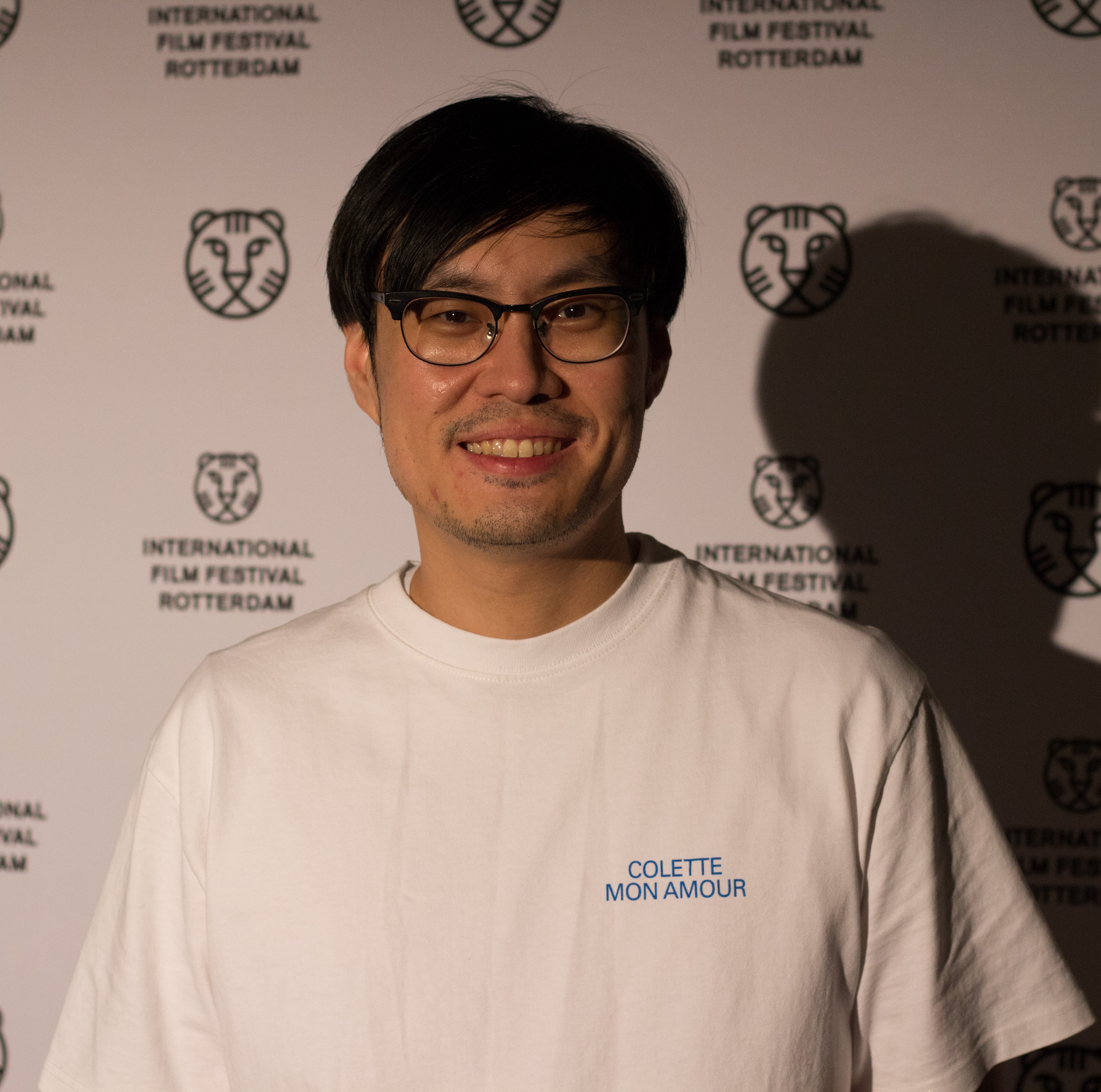
Nawapol Thamrongrattanarit, 2012 co-winner

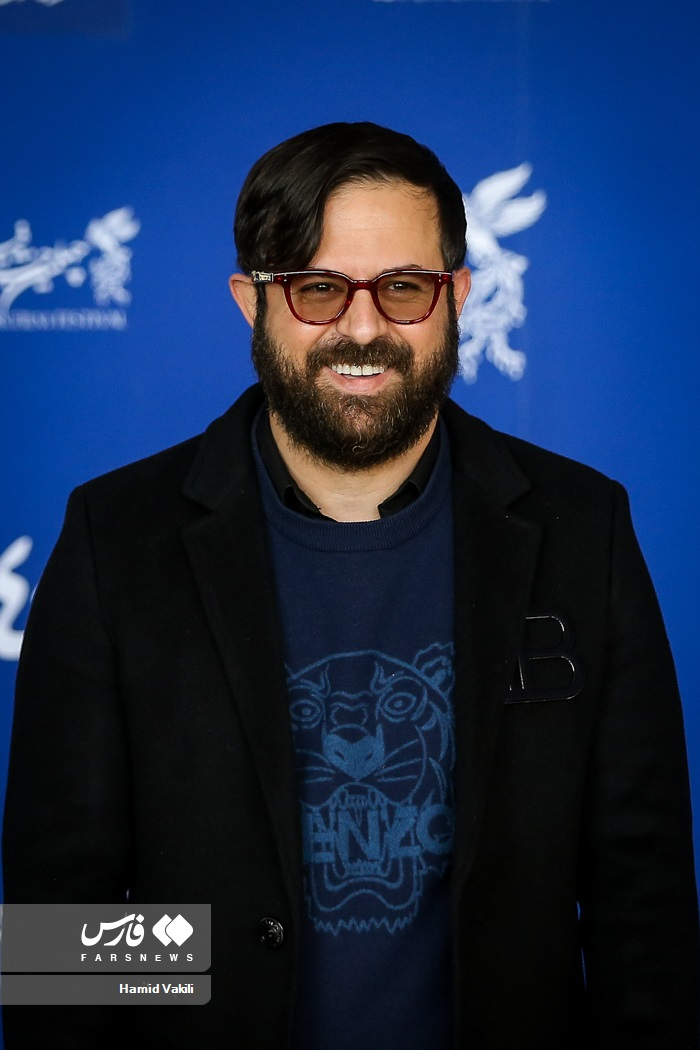
Houman Seyyedi, 2014 co-winner

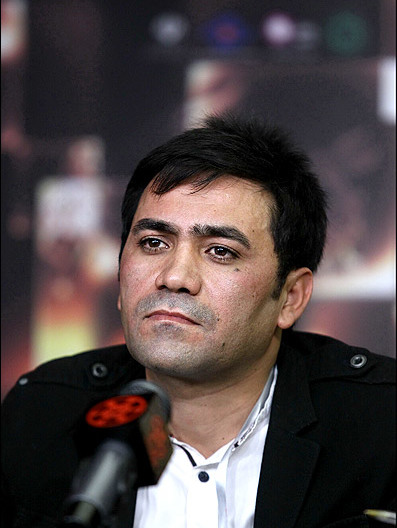
Seyed Hadi Mohaghegh, 2015 co-winner

Key
‡	Indicates New Currents winners
†	Indicates Special Mention winner

=== 1990s ===
Year	English title	Original title	Director(s)	Production countrie(s)
1996	Rain Clouds over Wushan‡	巫山云雨	Zhang Ming	China
1996	Accidental Legend	飛天	Wang Shaudi	Taiwan
1996	Ah-Chung	忠仔	Chang Tso-chi	Taiwan
1996	All Usual in the Village	Xiaocun wu gushi	Yu Xiangyuan	China
1996	Common Plight	Dard-e moshtarak	Yassamin Maleknasr	Iran
1996	Dark Night of the Soul	Anantha Rathriya	Prasanna Vithanage	Sri Lanka
1996	Mee Pok Man		Eric Khoo	Singapore
1996	Nineteenth April	উনিশে এপ্রিল	Rituparno Ghosh	India
1996	Okaeri	おかえり	Makoto Shinozaki	Japan
1996	Three Friends	세친구	Yim Soon-rye	South Korea
1996	Time Lasts	시간은 오래 지속된다	Kim Eung-soo	South Korea
1996	The White Balloon	بادکنک سفید	Jafar Panahi	Iran
1996	Yuri	유리	Yang Yun-ho	South Korea
1997	Motel Cactus‡	모텔 선인장	Park Ki-yong	South Korea
1997	After the Crescent	月未老	Chang Wai Chung	Hong Kong
1997	Falling Up Waking Down		Arthur Chyu	Taiwan
1997	Fiction	Kahini	Malay Bhattacharya	India
1997	Fun Bar Karaoke	ฝัน บ้า คาราโอเกะ	Pen-ek Ratanaruang	Thailand
1997	Green Fish	초록물고기	Lee Chang-dong	South Korea
1997	Just Another Day	いつものように	Satoshi Kenmochi	Japan
1997	Made in Hong Kong	香港製造	Fruit Chan	Hong Kong
1997	My Secret Cache	ひみつの花園	Shinobu Yaguchi	Japan
1997	Paper Airplanes	Mooshak e Kaghazi	Farhad Mehranfar	Iran
1997	Wind Echoing in My Being	내 안에 우는 바람	Jeon Soo-il	South Korea
1998	Xiao Wu‡	小武	Jia Zhangke	China
1998	After Life	ワンダフルライフ	Hirokazu Kore-eda	Japan
1998	Fly Low	하우등	Kim Si-un	South Korea
1998	Girls' Night Out	처녀들의 저녁식사	Im Sang-soo	South Korea
1998	Ikinai	生きない	Hiroshi Shimizu	Japan
1998	The Making of Steel	长大成人	Lu Xuechang	China
1998	Paradise Sea	楽園	Koji Hagiuda	Japan
1998	Too Many Ways to Be No. 1	一個字頭的誕生	Wai Ka-fai	Hong Kong
1998	The Tree of Life	Derakht-e-jan	Farhad Mehranfar	Iran
1998	The Weight of Cotton	Rui Ka Bojh	Subhash Agrawal	India
1998	Who Is Running?	ท้าฟ้าลิขิต	Oxide Pang	Thailand
1998	Yellow Flower	둘 하나 섹스	Lee Ji-sung	South Korea
1999	Timeless Melody‡	タイムレスメロディ	Hiroshi Okuhara	Japan
1999	Autumn Blossoms	あつもの	Shunsaku Ikehata	Japan
1999	The Bird Who Stops in the Air	새는 폐곡선을 그린다	Jeon Soo-il	South Korea
1999	Black Hole	구멍	Kim Kuk-hyeong	South Korea
1999	The Cup	ཕོར་པ།	Khyentse Norbu	Bhutan, Australia
1999	Love Will Tear Us Apart	天上人間	Yu Lik-wai	Hong Kong, China
1999	Men and Women	男男女女	Liu Bingjian	China
1999	O-Negative	รัก-ออกแบบไม่ได้	Pinyu Roothum	Thailand
1999	The Outcast	Padadaya	Linton Semage	Sri Lanka
1999	Postcard	明信片	Cheng Wen-tang	Taiwan
1999	Sri		Marselli Sumarno	Indonesia
1999	Throne of Death	Marana Simhasanam	Murali Nair	India

=== 2000s ===
Year	English title	Original title	Director(s)	Production countrie(s)
2000	The Day I Became a Woman‡	روزی که زن شدم	Marzieh Meshkini	Iran, Italy
2000	Die Bad	죽거나 혹은 나쁘거나	Ryoo Seung-wan	South Korea
2000	Djomeh	جمعه	Hassan Yektapanah	Iran
2000	Father	冤家父子	Wang Shuo	China
2000	Fluffy Rhapsody	起毛球了	Wu Mi-sen	Taiwan
2000	Hidden Whisper	小百无禁忌	Vivian Chang	Taiwan
2000	Interview	인터뷰	Daniel H. Byun	South Korea
2000	Not Forgotten	忘れられぬ人々	Makoto Shinozaki	Japan
2000	The Paper	纸	Ding Jiancheng	China
2000	Pomildong Blues		Kim Hee-jin	South Korea
2000	Sunflower	ひまわり	Isao Yukisada	Japan
2000	Twelve Nights	十二夜	Lam Oi-Wah	Hong Kong
2001	Flower Island‡	꽃섬	Song Il-gon	South Korea
2001	Blue Spring	青い春	Toshiaki Toyoda	Japan
2001	Conjugation	动词变位	Emily Tang	Hong Kong
2001	Dejavu		Biju Viswanath	India
2001	A Drowning Man	溺れる人	Naoki Ichio	Japan
2001	Going By	از کنار هم میگذریم	Iraj Karimi	Iran
2001	Maya		Digvijay Singh	India
2001	Seafood	海鲜	Zhu Wen	China
2001	Take Care of My Cat	고양이를 부탁해	Jeong Jae-eun	South Korea
2001	The Unfinished Song	Qateh-ye natamam	Maziar Miri	Iran
2001	Whispering Sands	Pasir Berbisik	Nan T. Achnas	Indonesia
2002	Jealousy Is My Middle Name‡	질투는 나의 힘	Park Chan-ok	South Korea
2002	The Rite... A Passion‡	Thilaadanam	K. N. T. Sastry	India
2002	Ardor	밀애	Byun Young-joo	South Korea
2002	Border Line		Lee Sang-il	Japan
2002	Brave 20	鹹豆漿	Wang Ming Tai	Taiwan
2002	Eliana, Eliana		Riri Riza	Indonesia
2002	The Missing Gun	寻枪	Lu Chuan	China
2002	Too Young to Die	죽어도 좋아	Park Jin-pyo	South Korea
2002	The Trigger	扣板机	Alex Yang	Taiwan
2002	Woman of Water	水の女	Hidenori Sugimori	Japan
2002	Women's Prison	زندان زنان	Manijeh Hekmat	Iran
2003	The Missing‡	不見	Lee Kang-sheng	Taiwan
2003	Tiny Snowflakes‡	Danehaye rize barf	Alireza Amini	Iran
2003	15		Royston Tan	Singapore
2003	An Estranged Paradise	陌生天堂	Yang Fudong	China
2003	Dancing in the Dust	رقص در غبار	Asghar Farhadi	Iran
2003	The Floating Landscape	戀之風景	Carol Lai	Hong Kong
2003	Matrubhoomi: A Nation Without Women	मातृभूमि	Manish Jha	India
2003	One Night Husband	คืนไร้เงา	Pimpaka Towira	Thailand
2003	The Only Sons	山清水秀	Xiao'er Gan	China
2003	Osama	اُسامه	Siddiq Barmak	Afghanistan, Iran
2003	River	リバー	Takayuki Suzui	Japan
2003	The Road Taken	선택	Hong Ki-seon	South Korea
2003	Uniform	制服	Diao Yinan	China
2004	This Charming Girl‡	여자, 정혜	Lee Yoon-ki	South Korea
2004	Sanctuary†		Yuhang Ho	Malaysia
2004	The Cat of Hollywood		Pierre Lam	Hong Kong
2004	Dogs & Cats	犬猫	Nami Iguchi	Japan
2004	Holiday Dreaming	梦游夏威夷	Fu-chun Hsu	Taiwan
2004	The Killing	Danav	Makarand Deshpande	India
2004	My Generation	마이 제너레이션	Noh Dong-seok	South Korea
2004	The Rainmaker	Impian Kemarau	Ravi Bharwani	Indonesia
2004	So Cute	귀여워	Kim Soo-hyun	South Korea
2004	Soap Opera		Wuershan	China
2004	Survive Style 5+		Gen Sekiguchi	Japan
2004	Waiting Alone	独自等待	Dayyan Eng	China
2005	Grain in Ear‡	芒种	Zhang Lü	China, South Korea
2005	The Silent Holy Stones†	静静的嘛呢石	Wanma Caidan	China
2005	Big River	ビッグ・リバー	Atsushi Funahashi	Japan
2005	One Summer with You	与你同在的夏天	Xie Dongshen	Hong Kong
2005	The Peter Pan Formula	피터팬의 공식	Cho Chang-ho	South Korea
2005	Poet of the Wastes	شاعر زباله‌ها	Mohammad Ahmadi	Iran, Japan
2005	Reaching Silence	Nisshabd	Jahar Kanungo	India, France
2005	The Shoe Fairy	人鱼朵朵	Robin Lee	Taiwan, Hong Kong
2005	Ssunday Seoul	썬데이 서울	Park Sung-hun	South Korea
2005	The Unforgiven	용서받지 못한 자	Yoon Jong-bin	South Korea
2005	Writing on the Earth	Yadasht Bar Zamin	Ali Mohammad Ghasemi	Iran
2006	Betelnut‡	槟榔	Yang Heng	China
2006	Love Conquers All‡		Tan Chui Mui	Malaysia
2006	Distance	Yuanli	Wei Tie	China
2006	Driving with My Wife's Lover	아내의 애인을 만나다	Kim Tai-sik	South Korea
2006	Eternal Summer	盛夏光年	Leste Chen	Taiwan
2006	Just Like Before	Tulad ng Dati	Mike Sandejas	Philippines
2006	Luxury Car	江城夏日	Wang Chao	China, France
2006	The Railroad	경의선	Park Heung-sik	South Korea
2006	The Summer of Stickleback	ハリヨの夏	Mayu Nakamura	Japan
2006	The White Silk Dress	Áo Lụa Hà Đông	Lưu Huỳnh	Vietnam
2006	Wool 100%	ウール100%	Mai Tominaga	Japan
2007	Life Track‡	Gwedo	Jin Guanghao	China, South Korea
2007	Flower in the Pocket‡	口袋裏的花	Liew Seng Tat	Malaysia
2007	Wonderful Town‡	เมืองเหงาซ่อนรัก	Aditya Assarat	Thailand
2007	Asyl: Park and Love Hotel	パーク アンド ラブホテル	Izuru Kumasaka	Japan
2007	A Bao A Qu		Naoki Sato	Japan
2007	Endless Night		Jianlin Pan	China
2007	God Man Dog	流浪神狗人	Singing Chen	Taiwan
2007	Milky Way Liberation Front	은하해방전선	Yoon Seong-ho	South Korea
2007	My Song Is...	나의 노래는	Ahn Seul-gi	South Korea
2007	The Red Awn	红色康拜因	Cai Shangjun	China
2007	Tribe	Tribu	Jim Meer Libiran	Philippines
2008	Land of Scarecrows‡	Gwedo	Roh Gyeong-tae	South Korea, France
2008	Naked of Defenses‡	無防備	Masahide Ichii	Japan
2008	Er Dong†	二冬	Yang Jin	China
2008	Members of the Funeral†	장례식의 멤버	Baek Seung-bin	South Korea
2008	100		Chris Martinez	Philippines
2008	Blind Pig Who Wants to Fly	Babi Buta yang Ingin Terbang	Edwin	Indonesia
2008	Empty Chair	صندلی خالی	Saman Estereki	Iran
2008	Jalainur	Zha lai nuo er	Zhao Ye	China
2008	A Light in the Fog	Cheraghi dar meh	Panahbarkhoda Rezaee	Iran
2008	A Moment in June	ณ ขณะรัก	O. Nathapon	Thailand
2008	Ocean of an Old Man		Rajesh Shera	India
2008	The Pot	독	Kim Tae-gon	South Korea
2008	Routine Holiday	黄金周	Li Hongqi	China
2008	Turmoil	Аурелен	Sabit Kurmanbekov, Kanymbek Kassymbekov	Kazakhstan
2009	Kick Off‡	شوێنێک بۆ یاری	Shawkat Amin Korki	Iraq
2009	I'm in Trouble!‡	나는 곤경에 처했다!	So Sang-min	South Korea
2009	Squalor†	Astig	G.B. Sampedro	Philippines
2009	Dead Slowly	慢性中毒	Rita Hui	Hong Kong
2009	Lan	我们天上见	Jiang Wenli	China
2009	Lost Paradise in Tokyo	ロストパラダイス・イン・トーキョー	Kazuya Shiraishi	Japan
2009	A Man Who Ate His Cherries	Mardi ke gilass hayash ra khord	Payman Haghani	Iran
2009	Mundane History	เจ้านกกระจอก	Anocha Suwichakornpong	Thailand
2009	My Daughter	理发店的女儿	Charlotte Lim	Malaysia
2009	Paju	파주	Park Chan-ok	South Korea
2009	True Noon	Qiyami roz	Nosir Saidov	Tajikistan
2009	Vihir		Umesh Vinayak Kulkarni	India

=== 2010s ===
Year	English title	Original title	Director(s)	Production countrie(s)
2010	The Journals of Musan‡	무산일기	Park Jung-bum	South Korea
2010	Bleak Night‡	파수꾼	Yoon Sung-hyun	South Korea
2010	Ashamed	창피해	Kim Soo-hyeon	South Korea
2010	Eternity	ที่รัก	Sivaroj Kongsakul	Thailand
2010	The Floating Lives	Cánh đồng bất tận	Quang Binh Nguyen Phan	Vietnam, Singapore
2010	Lover's Discourse	恋人絮语	Derek Tsang, Jimmy Wan	Hong Kong, China
2010	Memories in March		Sanjoy Nag	India
2010	My Spectacular Theatre	盲人电影院	Lu Yang	China
2010	The Old Donkey	老驢頭	Li Ruijun	China
2010	The Quarter of Scarecrows	Garaqi daholakan	Hassan-Ali Mahmoud	Iraq
2010	Sampaguita, National Flower		Francis Xavier Eusebio Pasion	Philippines
2010	Strawberry Cliff	贖命	Chris Chow	Hong Kong, China, United States, France
2010	Ways of the Sea	Halaw	Sheron Dayoc	Philippines
2011	Mourning‡	Soog	Morteza Farshbaf	Iran
2011	Niño‡		Loy Arcenas	Philippines
2011	August Drizzle	නිකිණි වැස්ස	Aruna Jayawardana	Sri Lanka
2011	Choked	가시	Kim Joong-hyun	South Korea
2011	Damn Life	ダムライフ	Hitoshi Kitagawa	Japan
2011	Here...or There?	Do Hay Day	Siu Pham	Vietnam, Switzerland
2011	I Carried You Home	ปาดังเบซาร์	Tongpong Chantarangku	Thailand
2011	Lost in Mountain	空山軼	Gao Zipeng	China
2011	The Mirror Never Lies	Laut Bercermin	Kamila Andini	Indonesia
2011	The Passion of a Man Called Choe Che-u	동학, 수운 최제우	Stanley Park	South Korea
2011	Return to Burma		Midi Z	Myanmar, Taiwan
2011	Starry Starry Night	星空	Tom Lin Shu-yu	Taiwan, China, Hong Kong
2011	Watch Indian Circus	Dekh Indian Circus	Mangesh Hadawale	India
2012	36‡		Nawapol Thamrongrattanarit	Thailand
2012	Kayan‡		Maryam Najafi	Lebanon, Canada
2012	Filmistaan†		Nitin Kakkar	India
2012	About 111 Girls	درباره ی ۱۱۱ دختر	Nahid Ghobadi, Bijan Zmanpira	Iraq
2012	Apparition	Aparisyon	Isabel Sandoval (Note: Credited as Vincent Sandoval.)	Philippines
2012	Fatal	가시꽃	Lee Don-ku	South Korea
2012	Together	甜.秘密	Hsu Chao-jen	Taiwan
2012	The Town of Whales	くじらのまち	Keiko Tsuruoka	Japan
2012	Touch of the Light	逆光飛翔	Chang Jung-chi	Taiwan, Hong Kong, China
2012	Your Time Is Up	누구나 제 명에 죽고 싶다	Kim Seung-hyun	South Korea
2013	Pascha‡	파스카	Ahn Seon-kyoung	South Korea
2013	Remote Control‡	Алсын Удирдлага	Byamba Sakhya	Mongolia, Germany
2013	Transit†		Hannah Espia	Philippines
2013	10 Minutes	10분	Lee Yong-seung	South Korea
2013	Again	ゆるせない、逢いたい	Junichi Kanai	Japan
2013	Concrete Clouds	ภวังค์รัก	Lee Chatametikool	Thailand
2013	The Isthmus	ที่ว่างระหว่างสมุทร	Sopawan Boonnimitra, Peerachai Kerdsint	Thailand
2013	Sarikend		Mehdi Parizad	Iran
2013	Steel Cold Winter	소녀	Choi Jin-sung	South Korea
2013	The Story of an Old Woman	История одной старушки	Alexey Gorlov	Kazakhstan
2013	Toilet Blues		Dirmawan Hatta	Indonesia
2013	Water	Jal	Girish Malik	India
2014	End of Winter‡	철원기행	Kim Dae-hwan	South Korea
2014	13†	۱۳	Houman Seyyedi	Iran
2014	(Sex) Appeal	寒蟬效應	Wang Wei-ming	Taiwan
2014	Don't Say That Word	ガンバレとかうるせえ	Takuma Sato	Japan
2014	The Face of the Ash		Shakhwan Idrees	Iraq
2014	Ghadi	غدي	Amin Dora	Lebanon, Qatar
2014	Jalal's Story	জালালের গল্প	Abu Shahed Emon	Bangladesh
2014	Mariquina		Milo Sogueco	Philippines
2014	Nezha	少女哪吒	Li Xiaofeng	China
2014	Sunrise		Partho Sen-Gupta	India, France
2014	We Will Be OK	그들이 죽었다	Baek Jae-ho	South Korea
2014	What's the Time in Your World?	در دنیای تو ساعت چند است؟	Safi Yazdanian	Iran
2015	Immortal‡	ممیرو	Seyed Hadi Mohaghegh	Iran
2015	Walnut Tree‡	Zhangak tal	Yerlan Nurmukhambetov	Kazakhstan
2015	Black Horse Memories	خاطرات اسب سیاه	Shahram Alidi	Iran, Turkey
2015	Communication & Lies	소통과 거짓말	Lee Seung-won	South Korea
2015	Go Home		Jihane Chouaib	Lebanon, France, Switzerland, Belgium
2015	Night and Fog in Zona	천당의 밤과 안개	Jung Sung-il	South Korea
2015	Radio Set	Radiopetti	Hari Viswanath	India
2015	West North West	西北西	Takuro Nakamura	Japan
2016	The Donor‡	捐赠者	Zang Xichuan	China
2016	Knife in the Clear Water‡	清水里的刀子	Xuebo Wang	China
2016	Parting†	رفتن	Navid Mahmoudi	Iran, Afghanistan
2016	A Billion Colour Story		Padmakumar Narasimhamurthy	India
2016	Burning Birds	දැවෙන විහඟුන්	Sanjeewa Pushpakumara	Sri Lanka, France, Netherlands, Qatar
2016	Her Mother	HER MOTHER 娘を殺した死刑囚との対話	Yoshinori Sato	Japan
2016	In Between Seasons	환절기	Lee Dong-eun	South Korea
2016	Lady of the Lake	Loktak Lairembee	Haobam Paban Kumar	India
2016	Merry Christmas Mr. Mo	메리 크리스마스 미스터 모	Lim Dae-hyung	South Korea
2016	Someone to Talk to	一句顶一万句	Liu Yulin	China, Hong Kong
2016	White Ant	白蟻─慾望謎網	Chu Hsien-che	
2017	After My Death‡	죄 많은 소녀	Kim Ui-seok	South Korea
2017	Blockage‡	سد معبر	Mohsen Gharaei	Iran
2017	Ajji		Devashish Makhija	India
2017	Ashwatthama		Pushpendra Singh	India, South Korea
2017	End of Summer	西小河的夏天	Zhou Quan	China
2017	How to Breathe Underwater	물속에서 숨 쉬는 법	Ko Hyun-seok	South Korea
2017	Last Child	살아남은 아이	Shin Dong-seok	South Korea
2017	The Last Verse	最後的詩句	Ying-Ting Tseng	Taiwan
2017	One Night on the Wharf	在码头	Han Dong	China
2017	Somewhere Beyond the Mist	藍天白雲	Cheung King-wai	Hong Kong, China
2018	Clean Up‡	호흡	Kwon Man-ki	South Korea
2018	Savage‡	雪暴	Cui Si Wei	China
2018	Aurora		Bekzat Pirmatov	Kyrgyzstan
2018	Gold Carrier	حمال طلا	Touraj Aslani	Iran
2018	His Lost Name	夜明け	Nanako Hirose	Japan
2018	House of Hummingbird	벌새	Kim Bora	South Korea
2018	House of My Fathers	නොමියෙන මතකය	Suba Sivakumaran	Sri Lanka
2018	The Red Phallus		Tashi Gyeltshen	Bhutan
2018	Second Life	선희와 슬기	Park Young-ju	South Korea
2018	Vanishing Days	漫游	Zhu Xin	China
2019	Ròm‡		Tran Thanh Huy	Vietnam
2019	Haifa Street‡	شارع حيفا	Mohanad Hayal	Iraq
2019	Among the Hills	در میان تپه‌ها	Mohammadreza Keivanfar	Iran
2019	Boluomi	菠蘿蜜	Kek Huat Lau, Vera Chen	Taiwan
2019	Diapason	شب اول 18 سالگی	Hamed Tehrani	Iran
2019	The Education	에듀케이션	Kim Duk-joong	South Korea
2019	John Denver Trending		Arden Rod Condez	Philippines
2019	Just Like That	Aise Hee	Kislay Kislay	India
2019	Lucky Monster	럭키 몬스터	Bong Joon-young	South Korea
2019	My Identity	神様のいるところ	Sae Suzuki	Japan
2019	An Old Lady	69세	Lim Sun-ae	South Korea
2019	Over the Sea	少年与海	Aoqian Sun	China
2019	A Road to Spring	通往春天的列车	Li Ji	China
2019	Running to the Sky	Жөө Күлүк	Mirlan Abdykalykov	Kyrgyzstan

=== 2020s ===
Year	English title	Original title	Director(s)	Production countrie(s)
2020	A Balance‡	由宇子の天秤	Yujiro Harumoto	Japan
2020	Three‡	Tpu	Ruslan Pak	Kazakhstan, South Korea, Uzbekistan
2020	Bilesuvar		Elvin Adigozel	Azerbaijan, France
2020	Butterfly on a Windowpane	ऐना झ्यालको पुतली	Sujit Bidari	Nepal
2020	Chnchik		Aram Shahbazyan	Armenia, Germany, Netherlands
2020	Harami	हरामी	Shyam Madiraju	India, United States
2020	A Leave	휴가	Lee Ran-hee	South Korea
2020	Money Has Four Legs	ခြေလေးချောင်	Maung Sun	Myanmar
2020	Snowball	최선의 삶	Lee Woo-jung	South Korea
2020	Summer Blur	汉南夏日	Han Shuai	China
2021	Farewell, My Hometown‡	再见，乐园	Wang Er Zhuo	China
2021	The Apartment with Two Women‡	같은 속옷을 입는 두 여자	Kim Se-in	South Korea
2021	The Absent Director	در نبود کارگردان	Arvand Dashtaray	Iran
2021	Asteroid	سیارک	Mehdi Hosseinivand Aalipour	Iran
2021	House of Time	কালকোকখো	Rajdeep Paul, Sarmistha Maiti	India
2021	Memoryland	Miền ký ức	Kim Quy Bui	Vietnam, Germany
2021	Missing	さがす	Shinzo Katayama	Japan
2021	Pedro		Natesh Hedge	India
2021	Photocopier	Penyalin Cahaya	Wregas Bhanuteja	Indonesia
2021	Red Pomegranate	қызыл анар	Sharipa Urazbayeva	Kazakhstan
2021	Seire	세이레	Kang Park	South Korea
2022	A Wild Roomer‡	괴인	Lee Jeong-hong	South Korea
2022	Shivamma‡		Jaishankar Aryar	India
2022	Ajoomma	아줌마	He Shuming	Singapore, South Korea
2022	Blue Again	บลู อะเกน	Thapanee Loosuwan	Thailand
2022	Long Live Hell	지옥만세	Im Oh-jeong	South Korea
2022	Memento Mori: Earth	Memento Mori: Đất	Marcus Mạnh Cường Vũ	Vietnam
2022	No End	Bi payan	Nader Saeivar	Iran
2022	A Place of Silence		Sam Quah	Malaysia
2022	A Thousand and One Nights	千夜、一夜	Nao Kubota	Japan
2022	The Winter Within	Maagh	Aamir Bashir	India
2023
2023	Boli – The Wrestler	বলী	Iqbal Hossain Chowdhury	Bangladesh
2023	September 1923‡	福田村事件	Tatsuya Mori	Japan
2023	After a Fever		Akira Yamamoto	Japan
2023	Borrowed Time		Choi Ji	China
2023	Heritage	부모 바보	Lee Jong-soo	South Korea
2023	Now, Oasis		Chia Chee Sum	Malaysia
2023	Solids by the Seashore	ทะเลของฉันมีคลื่นเล็กน้อยถึงปานกลาง	Patiparn Boontarig	Thailand
2023	Spark		Rajesh Zala	India
2023	Stranger	Agantuk	Biplop Sarkar	Bangladesh
2023	That Summer Lie	그 여름날의 거짓말	Son Hyeon-rok	South Korea
2024
2024	The Land of Morning Calm	아침바다 갈매기는	Park Yi-woong	South Korea
2024	Ma – Cry of Silence		The Maw Nang	Myanmar, Korea, Singapore, France, Norway, Qatar
2024	Able		Elzak Eskendir	Kazakhstan
2024	As the River Goes By		Charles Hu	China
2024	For Rana		Iman Yazadi	Iran
2024	The Height of the Coconut Trees		Du Jie	Japan
2024	Kaneko’s Commissar		Furukawa Go	Japan
2024	Montages of a Modern Motherhood	虎毒不	Oliver Chan	Hong Kong
2024	Tale of the Land		Loeloe Hendra	Indonesia, Philippines, Qatar
2024	Waterdrop	수연의 선율	Choi Jong-yong	South Korea

== New Currents Award (Debut Feature) ==
Year	English title	Original title	Director(s)	Production countrie(s)
2025	En Route To	지우러 가는 길	Yoo Jae-in	South Korea
2026	Birds in the Dark	ਹਨ੍ਹੇਰੇ ਦੇ ਪੰਛੀ (Hanere de Panchhi)	Shashank Walia	India
