= Fukuda Village Incident =

1923 mass murder in Chiba, Japan

The Fukuda Village Incident (Japanese: 福田村事件; also Fukudamura Incident) was a mass murder committed as part of the larger Kantō Massacre in Fukuda Village (now in Noda), Chiba Prefecture, Empire of Japan on September 6, 1923. Nine ethnic Japanese people, including women and children, were killed on suspicion that they were ethnic Koreans.

== Background ==
Immediately after the destructive Great Kantō Earthquake, rumors emerged that ethnic Koreans were planning to commit crimes across Japan. These rumors were, in part, supported by a cable sent under the name of Fumio Gotō, then director general of the Police Affairs Bureau of the Ministry of the Interior. The cable stated, "Taking advantage of the earthquake, Koreans are setting fires in various places, and...in Tokyo there are those who possess bombs, pour oil, and set fires". It urged regional directors to "strictly control the behavior" of Koreans.

Lynch mobs soon formed, armed with swords and weapons. People were questioned at random as to whether or not they were Korean. Koreans who were positively identified were often killed, although victims also included Chinese and misidentified Japanese.

== Incident ==
A group of 15 traveling merchants was stopped by a lynch mob. Nine of them were killed after being mistakenly identified as Korean; among the dead were children and a pregnant woman, who were from the severely disadvantaged former burakumin caste.

== Legacy ==
On September 1, 2023, a film about the events in Fukuda entitled September 1923 was released on the 100th anniversary of the Kantō Massacre.
