= September 1923 (film) =

2023 historical film by Tatsuya Mori

- Theatrical release poster
- Directed by: Tatsuya Mori
- Written by: Haruhiko Arai
- Starring: Arata Iura; Rena Tanaka; Eita Nagayama
- Cinematography: Tadashi Kuwabara
- Edited by: Chieko Suzaki
- Music by: Keiichi Suzuki
- Release date: 1 September 2023 (Japan)
- Running time: 137 minutes
- Country: Japan
- Language: Japanese

September 1923 (Japanese: 福田村事件, Hepburn: Fukudamura jiken; lit. 'Fukuda Village Incident') is a Japanese film about the Fukuda Village Incident, in which nine ethnic Japanese people, including women and children, were killed on suspicion that they were ethnic Koreans. It was released on September 1, 2023, the 100th anniversary of the Kantō Massacre.

The film won the New Currents award at the 28th Busan International Film Festival.

== Cast ==
- Arata Iura as Tomokazu Sawada
- Rena Tanaka as Shizuko Sawada
- Eita Nagayama
- Akira Emoto
- Masahiro Higashide
- Kosuke Toyohara
- Pierre Taki

== Production ==
The director, Tatsuya Mori, first learned of this incident through a small newspaper article about a movement to establish a memorial to the victims. However, he had difficulty finding records on the details of the incident. The contemporary president of the neighborhood association that the victims came from speculated that the six surviving members may have avoided speaking out about the incident, as they felt that they would have been ignored as burakumin. However, the president also expressed apprehension about the film, and said "Digging up the incident might lead to younger generations experiencing discrimination against our community once again. We don't want our children to experience the discrimination we went through".

Mori described his motivation as follows:

In modern Japan, I think there is a strong and growing tendency to look away from our negative history. But I believe that people grow up by remembering their mistakes.

They had difficulty raising funds for the film due to its subject matter, but eventually managed to raise 35 million yen ($253,000) through a crowdfunding campaign. They also had difficulty with casting, as talent agencies often avoid having their actors appear in controversial films. In spite of this, well-known actors, including Rena Tanaka and Arata Iura, ended up appearing in the film. Tanaka stated that she was motivated to participate in the film due to parallels that she felt between the murders and events in the contemporary Russian invasion of Ukraine. Iura admired Mori's goals for creating the film, and had already acted in films with strong social messages before.

Principal photography for the film began on August 20, 2022, and lasted until mid-September. Shooting took place mainly in Kyoto and Shiga prefectures.

== Accolades ==
Award	Category	Recipient(s)	Result	Ref.
28th Busan International Film Festival	New Currents Award	September 1923	Won	
47th Japan Academy Film Prize	Best Film	September 1923	Nominated	
47th Japan Academy Film Prize	Best Director	Tatsuya Mori	Nominated	
47th Japan Academy Film Prize	Best Screenplay	Toshimichi Saeki, Jun'ichi Inoue, and Haruhiko Arai	Nominated	
