= The Movie Emperor =

2023 Chinese-Hong Kong film by Ning Hao

- Theatrical release poster
- Traditional Chinese: 紅毯先生
- Simplified Chinese: 红毯先生
- Literal meaning: Mr Red Carpet
- Directed by: Ning Hao
- Written by: Liu Xiaodan; Wang Ang; Daniel Yu
- Produced by: Wang Yibing; Daniel Yu; Winnie Liao; Xing Aina
- Starring: Andy Lau
- Cinematography: Wang Boxue
- Edited by: Du Yuan
- Music by: Raymond Wong; Russel C J Wong
- Production companies: Huanxi Media Group Limited (Shanghai); Huanxi Media Group Limited; Huanxi Media Group Limited (Beijing); Dirty Monkeys (Shanghai) Culture Communication Ltd.
- Distributed by: CMC Pictures
- Release dates: 15 September 2023 (TIFF); 15 March 2024 (China)
- Running time: 127 minutes
- Countries: China; Hong Kong
- Languages: Mandarin; Cantonese
- Budget: ¥261 million
- Box office: ¥94.18 million

The Movie Emperor (Chinese: 红毯先生; pinyin: Hóng tǎn xiānshēng; lit. 'Mr. Red carpet') is a 2023 satirical comedy film directed by Ning Hao and starring Andy Lau. The film is a co-production between China and Hong Kong, and had its premiere at the 2023 Toronto International Film Festival in Gala Presentations section on 15 September 2023. It was also the closing film of the 28th Busan International Film Festival where it was screened on 13 October 2023.

== Synopsis ==
The film tells the story of a Hong Kong film star, Dany Lau Wai-chi, who collaborates with a mainland Chinese director, Lin Hao, to create an awards-baiting arthouse film, where Lau stars as a peasant farmer.

== Cast ==
- Andy Lau as Dany Lau Wai-chi (English name an anagram of Andy; Chinese name an amalgam of Andy Lau, Tony Leung Chiu-wai and Stephen Chow Sing-chi)
- Ning Hao as Lin Hao
- Rima Zeidan as Summer
- Pal Sinn as Lau's manager
- Kelly Lin as Lau's ex-wife
- Miriam Yeung as herself (cameo)
- Tony Leung Ka-fai as Leung Kin-fai (cameo)
- Wong Jing as Wong Kam (cameo)

== Production ==
In February 2022, the opening ceremony of the film was held in Shenzhen. Principal photography began on 23 February 2022. The filming locations also included Guangzhou, Shanwei, Haifeng County and Haikou, and filming was wrapped up on 21 April 2022.

== Release ==
The film was premiered at 2023 Toronto International Film Festival in Gala Presentations section on 15 September 2023 at Roy Thomson Hall. It was also selected in Gala Selection of the 36th Tokyo International Film Festival and was screened on 25 October 2023.

The film was initially scheduled for release in mainland China on 17 November 2023. However, on 8 November 2023, the film changed the release date to 10 February 2024, the first day of the Chinese New Year. Due to poor box office performance and low scheduling rates (representing the percentage of screenings in China) during the Chinese New Year, the film was withdrawn from its competitive slot on 16 February 2024, and rescheduled for later release on 15 March 2024. Ultimately, the film grossed only 94.18 million yuan in mainland China, becoming one of the year's biggest flops, and marking a rare misfire for both Andy Lau and Ning Hao.

== Reception ==
Kevin L. Lee reviewing for AwardsWatch at Toronto Film Festival, graded the film A− and praised the performance of lead actor writing, "[Andy] Lau not only continues to cement his place as a Hong Kong legend in cinema, but he strolls right in and delivers a comedic performance like no other."

Lee Marshall of ScreenDaily reviewing in Busan Film Festival opined that the film is "packed with references to Lau's career and to Hong Kong and mainland Chinese films and celebrity culture, [and] is a film that has been precision-engineered for local audiences." He concluded, "While there are more than a few China-specific in-jokes here, Hao's knowing comedy makes a good case for the cross-border universality of the world it portrays." Lee cited as an example "Yumeji's Theme" from the 2000 Hong Kong film In the Mood for Love, which is used as a repeated motif in the film.

Peter Debruge giving a positive review for Variety wrote that the film is "one of the year’s savvier satires."

== Controversy ==
One of the film's trailers featured a scene suggesting the "seat-swapping" controversy between Eddie Peng and Li Bingbing during the 2018 Weibo Movie Night. At the ceremony, Peng, who was supposed to be in the second row, allegedly took a first-row spot reserved for Li, infuriating the actress. However, the scene was cut from the theater version.
