= Gulbara Tolomushova =

Kyrgyz film critic

Gulbara Tolomushova Гульбара Толомушова
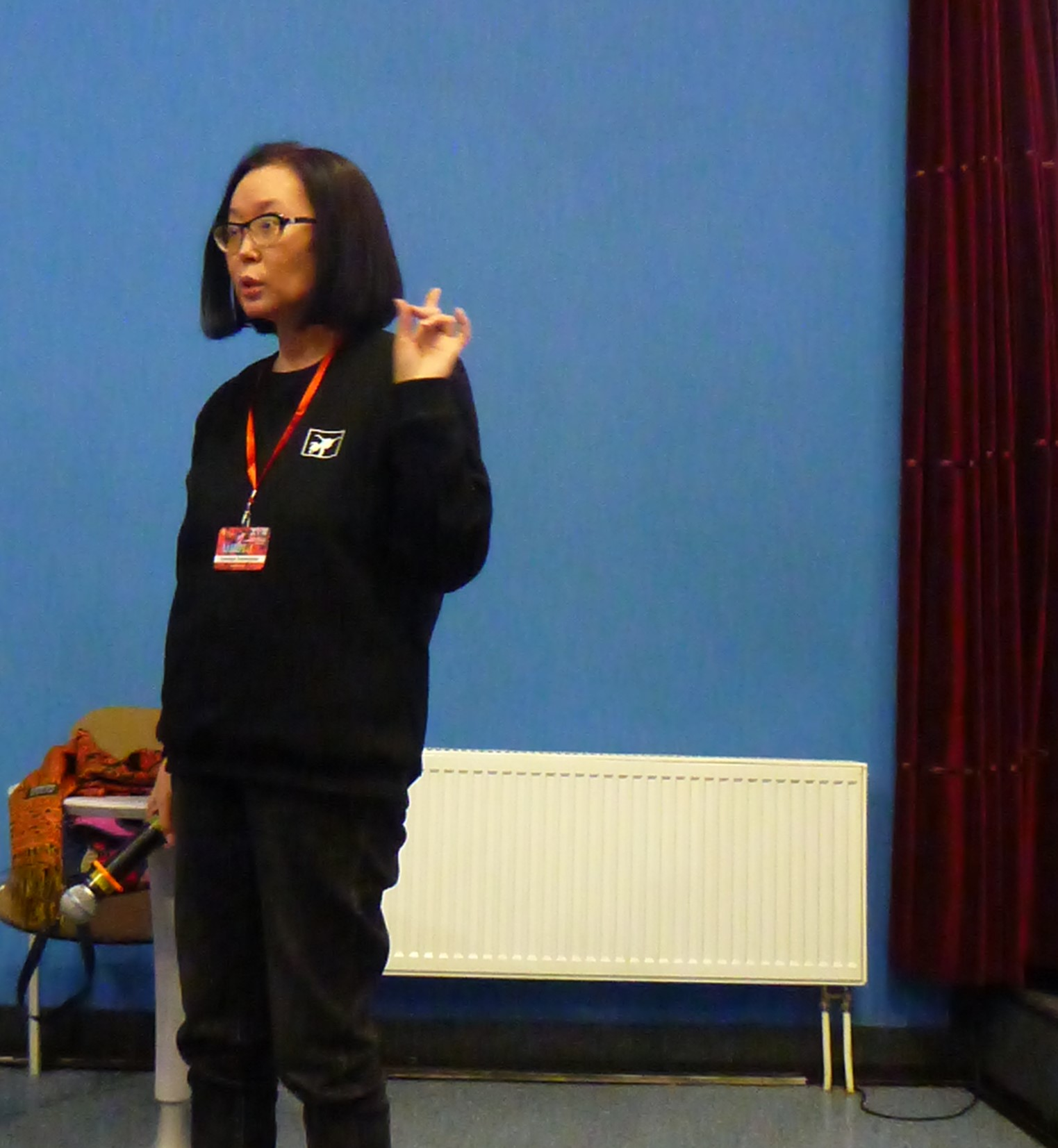
- Citizenship: Soviet Union→Kyrgyzstan
- Occupations: Kyrgyz TV director, Film historian, and film critic.

Gulbara Tolomushova (Russian: Гульбара Толомушова) is a Kyrgyzstani film critic, film historian, TV director and TV Presenter.

She was born in Frunze (now Bishkek), as the daughter of a film editor mother who traveled frequently to Moscow for work. She went on to study cinematography in Moscow, graduating from the Russian State Institute of Cinematography in 1989. Since then, she has directed numerous TV films and written about the medium for both internet and print publications. She has also served as a jury member on a number of film festivals. As a TV director, she specializes in documentaries on the subject of Kyrhyz cinema, art and culture. Employed by the Department of Cinematography of the Ministry of Culture and Tourism, she is a member of the International Federation of Film Critics and the Network for the Promotion of Asian Cinema. From 2004 until 2010, she was the deputy chair of the Kyrgyz Union of Filmmakers. She has also worked as a researcher at the Aitmatov Institute for Literature and Languages at the Kyrgyz Academy of Sciences. She has received a number of awards from the government of Kyrgyzstan for her work. Tolomushova has called Battleship Potemkin the first truly great film that she saw in her life. Officer of the Order of Arts and Letters, France, 04.07.2024.
