= Boli – The Wrestler =

2025 Bangladeshi sports drama film

- Poster
- Directed by: Iqbal Hossain Chowdhury
- Written by: Iqbal Hossain Chowdhury
- Produced by: Piplu R Khan; Shaiful Azim; Gousul Alam Shaon
- Starring: Nasir Uddin Khan; Priyam Archi; AKM Itmam; Angel Noor
- Cinematography: Tuhin Tajimul
- Edited by: Jharol Mendoza
- Music by: Ranadas Badsha
- Production companies: Applebox Films; Bangladesh Government
- Distributed by: Tiger Media
- Release date: 7 February 2025
- Country: Bangladesh
- Language: Bengali

Boli – The Wrestler is 2025 Bangladeshi sports drama film. It is directorial debut film of Iqbal Hossain Chowdhury and it is produced by Piplu R Khan under the banner of Applebox Films. The film stars Nasir Uddin Khan in the lead role as the title character alongside Priyam Archi, AKM Itmam, Angel Noor and others. The film was received a grant from the Bangladesh government in 2021 and it is based on the tradition of 'Jabbarer Boli Khela' in Chittagong and 'Coastal Myths'.

== Cast ==
- Nasir Uddin Khan as Moju
- Priyam Archi as Shafu
- AKM Itmam as Dofor
- Angel Noor as Rashu
- Tahadil Ahmed as Milon
- Prangan Shuvo
- Tanveer Ahmed

== Release ==
Boli directed by Iqbal Hossain Chowdhury is being released in 8 theaters across the Bangladesh on 7 February 2025. Before it is release, the film also screened at several prestigious film festivals around the world and also screened at the Dhaka International Film Festival. The film also screened at the Shanghai International Film Festival.

== Reception ==
Wroted by International Feature's survey "It is a film that feels both deeply grounded in regional authenticity and rich with esoteric mystery".

Writing for Screen Daily, John Berra noted that Iqbal H. Chowdhury's debut feature The Wrestler differs significantly from Darren Aronofsky's 2009 film of the same name. Instead of a tragic drama, Chowdhury's film offers a metaphysical exploration of mortality through Boli Khela, a traditional Bangladeshi wrestling form native to the Bay of Bengal region that relies on precise clinching, joint locking and pinning techniques.

Reviewing the film for Variety, Siddhant Adlakha described Iqbal H. Chowdhury’s directorial debut, The Wrestler, as a meticulous and slow-burning drama that mirrors the methodical nature of traditional Bangladeshi Boli khela. Adlakha noted that, the film uses an oblique, observational approach to explore masculine boundaries within a rural coastal setting, ultimately transitioning into a surreal and tragic portrayal of obsession.

Writing for The Times of India, Priyanka Dasgupta noted that, the film centers on an eccentric elderly fisherman training in the traditional Boli Khela wrestling style to challenge a village champion in Chittagong. Dasgupta also highlighted, the strong representation of Bangladeshi cinema at the festival, contrasting it with the absence of films from West Bengal's Tollywood industry.

== Awards ==
- The film won the Best Film award at the 28th Busan International Film Festival in 2023.
- Bangladesh has been officially selected the film in the 'Best International Feature Film Category' at the 97th Oscars.
