= Busan Cinema Center =

Movie complex in Busan, South Korea

Coordinates: 35.1712°N 129.1272°E

- 영화의전당
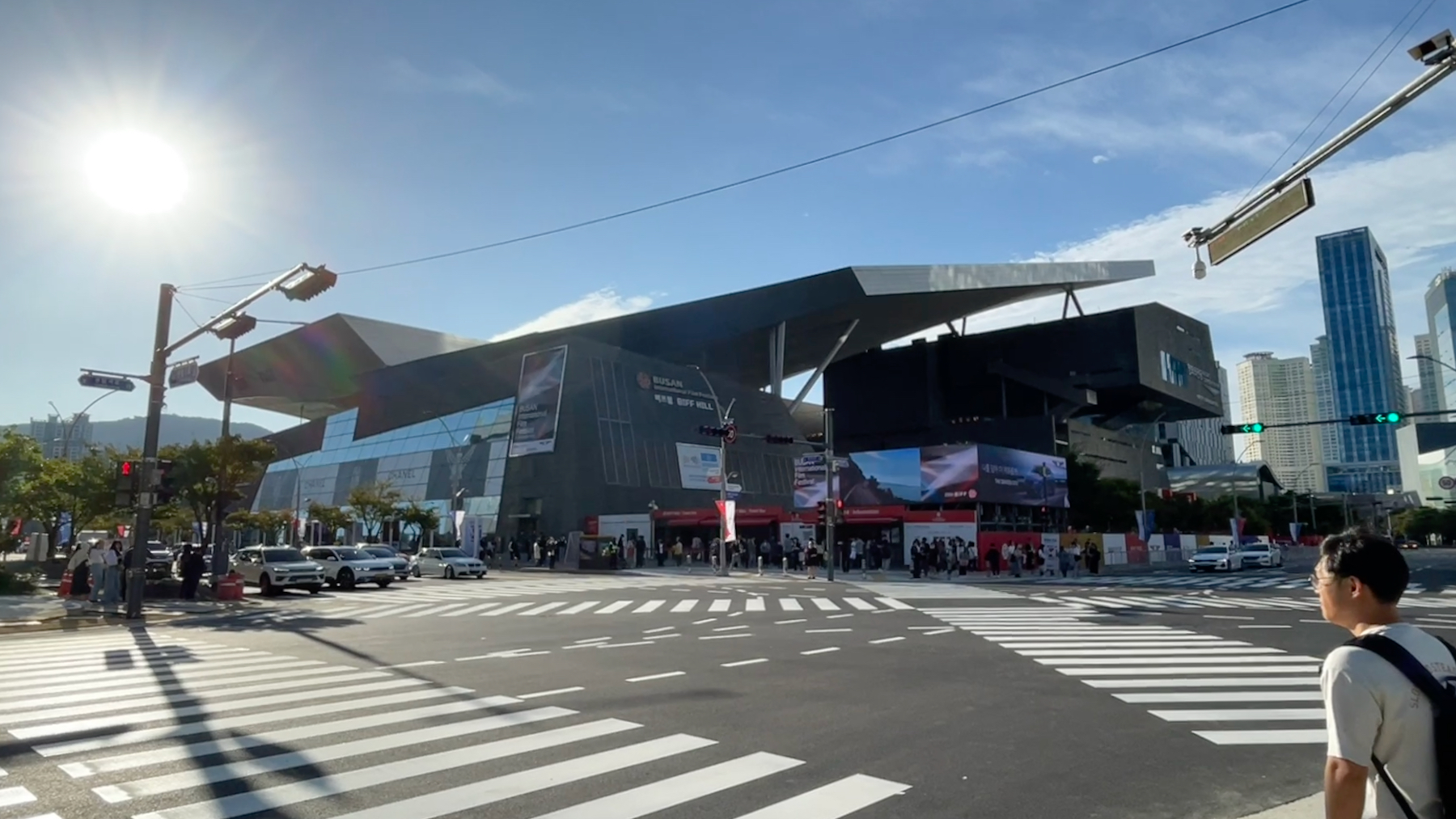
- Interactive map of Busan Cinema Center
- Address: 120 Suyeonggangbyeon-daero, Haeundae-gu; Busan; South Korea
- Owner: Busan Metropolitan City
- Operator: Busan Cinema Center
- Capacity: BIFF Theater: 4,000; Haneulyeon Theater: 841; Cinema I: 413; Cinema II: 212; Cinematheque: 212
- Type: Cinemas, theaters, concert halls, etc.

Construction
- Opened: September 29, 2011
- Architect: Coop Himmelb(l)au

Website
- https://www.dureraum.org/bccen/main/main.do

- Busan Cinema Center
- Hangul: 영화의전당
- Hanja: 映畫의殿堂
- Revised Romanization: Yeonghwaui-Jeondang
- McCune–Reischauer: Yŏnghwaŭi-Chŏndang

The Busan Cinema Center (Korean: 영화의전당), also called Dureraum (두레라움; lit. 'enjoying seeing movies together'), is the official venue of the Busan International Film Festival (BIFF), located in Centum City, Busan, South Korea. The about US$150 million (KRW 167.85 billion) center opened on September 29, 2011, almost three years after construction began.

The building won the International Architecture Award and the Chicago Athenaeum in 2007. As of July 2013, it has the Guinness World Record for the longest cantilever roof. The center was designed by the Austrian architectural design firm Coop Himmelb(l)au and constructed by Hanjin Heavy Industries.

== Facilities ==
The center comprises three buildings (Cine Mountain, Biff Hill, and Double Cone), Biff Theater (an outdoor theater) with the Small Roof, and Dureraum Square with the Big Roof. The Busan Cinema Center, built on a 32,137 m^{2} plot, occupies 54,335 m^{2} of performance, dining, entertainment, and administrative space. The center has two steel roofs. The Big Roof is 163 m long x 60 m wide with an 85 m cantilever portion and weighs 6,376 (metric) tons. The Small Roof covering the outdoor theater BIFF Theater has a span of 70 m and an area of 66 m x 100 to 120 m and weighs 1,236 (metric) tons. The Big Roof is the longest cantilever roof certified by Guinness World Records. The ceilings of the Big and Small Roofs are clad with 23,910 and 18,690 LED lights, respectively.

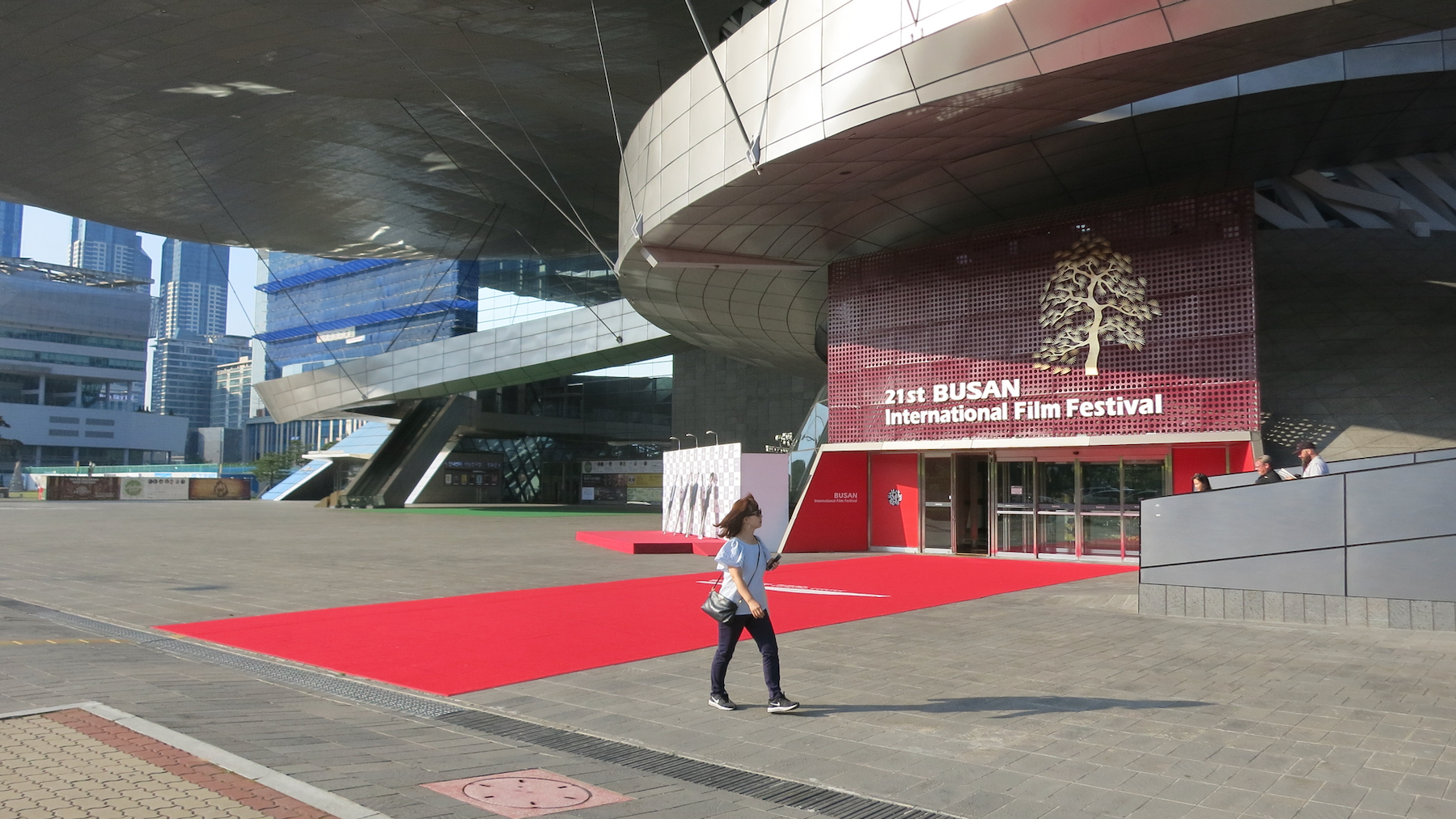
Busan Cinema Center entrance in 2014

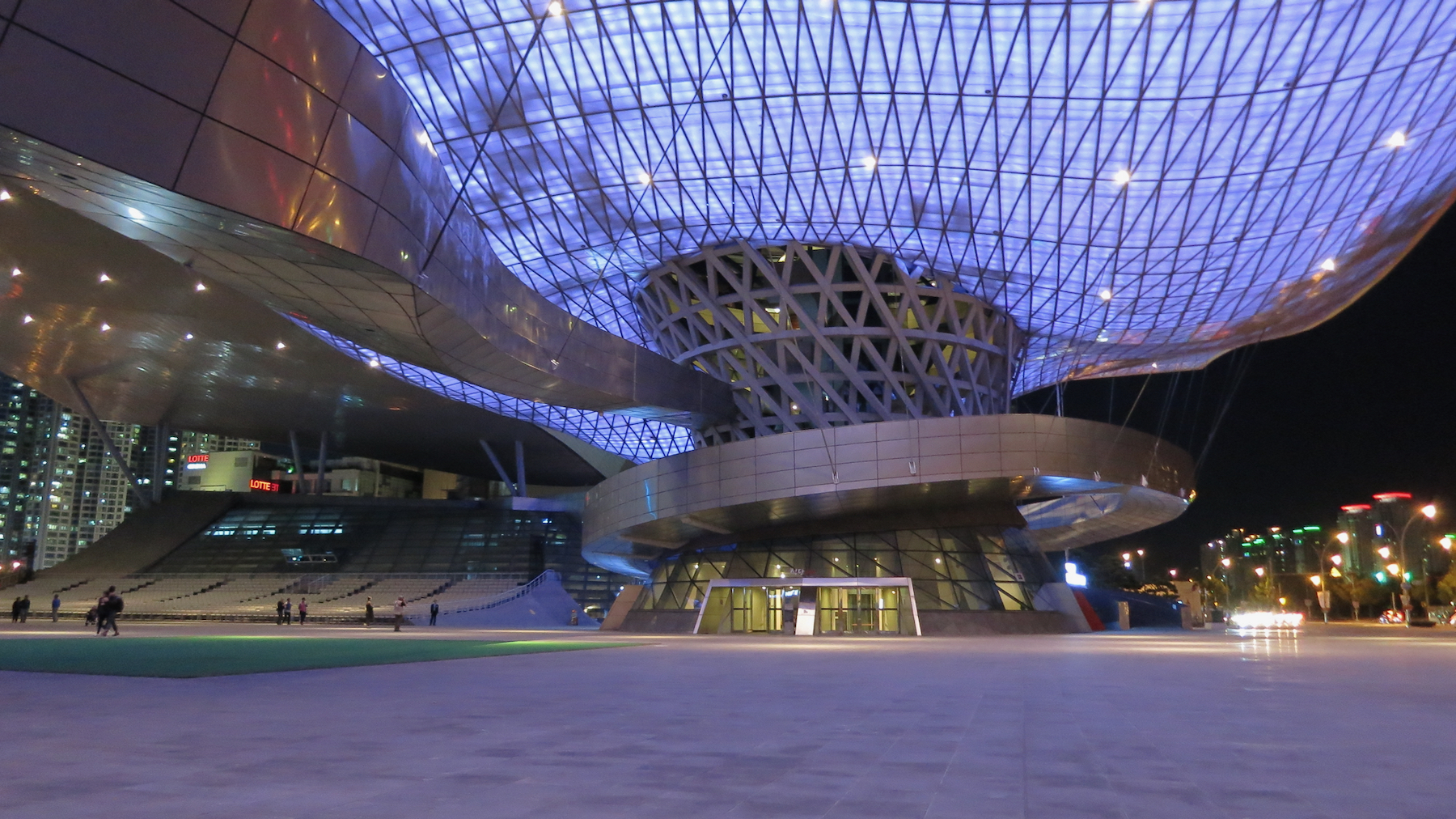
Busan Cinema Center features the longest cantilever roof in the world

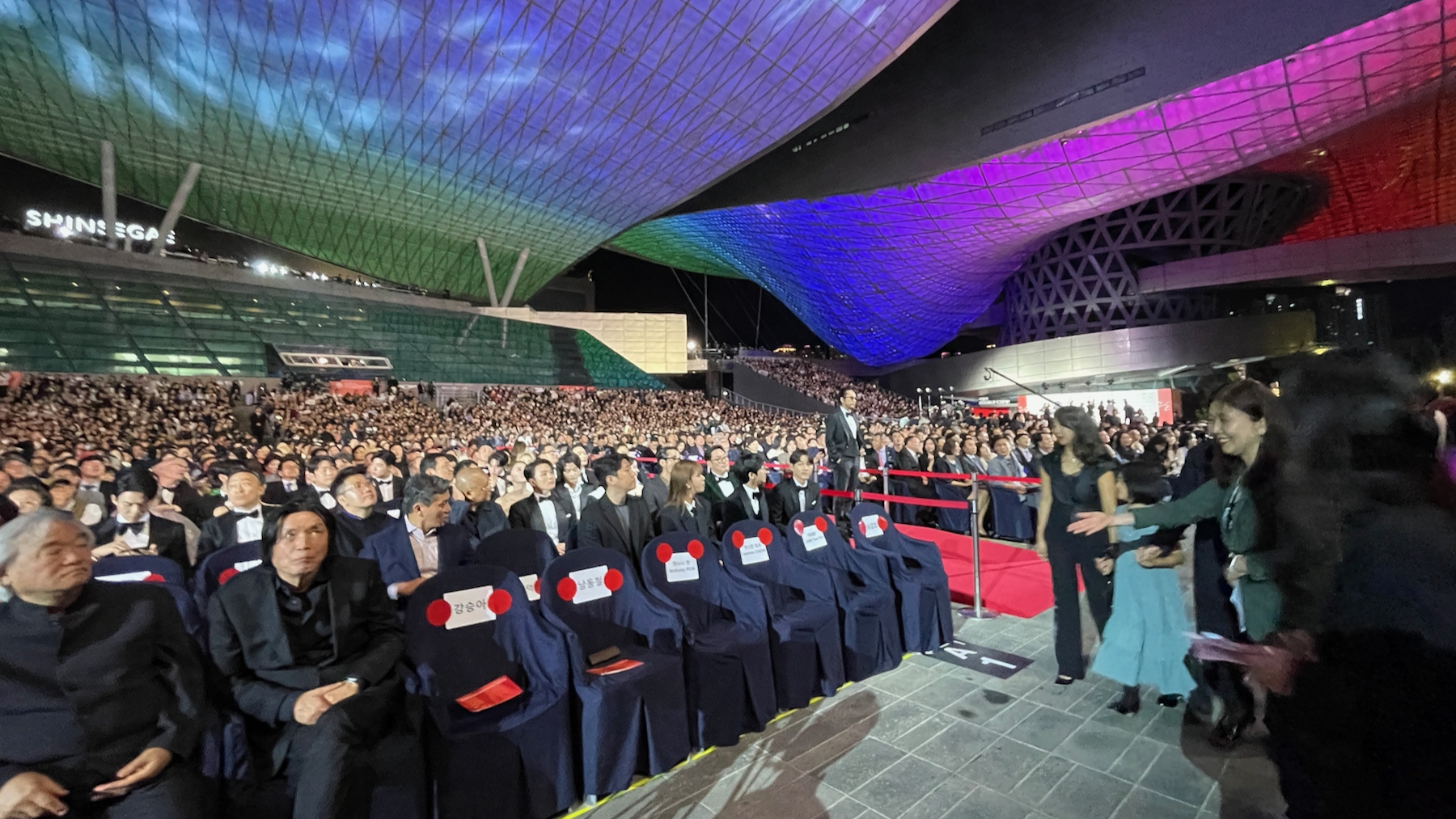
Busan Cinema Center during BIFF 2023

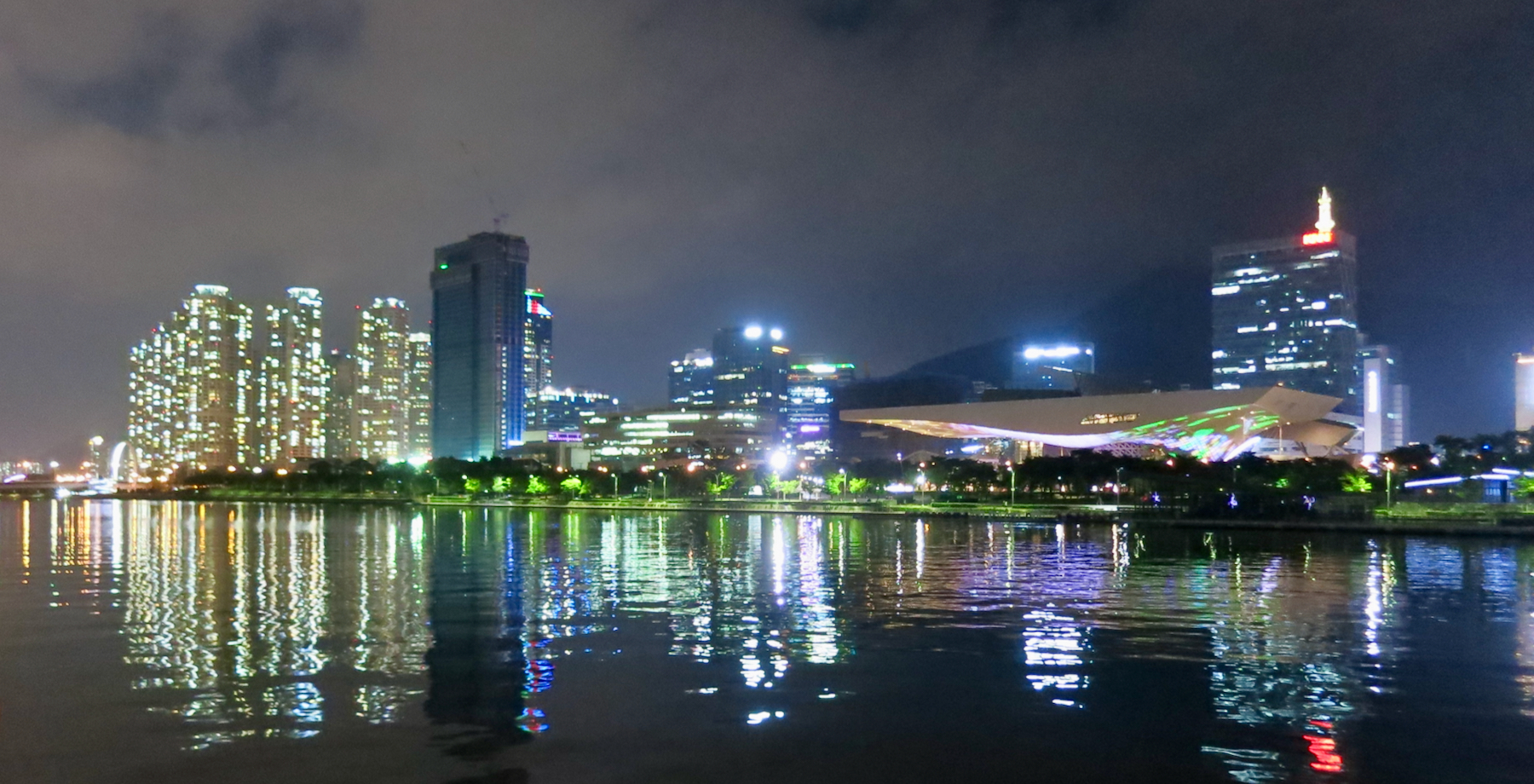
Busan Cinema Center from across the Suyeong River
