= Tatsuya Mori =

Japanese filmmaker (born 1956)

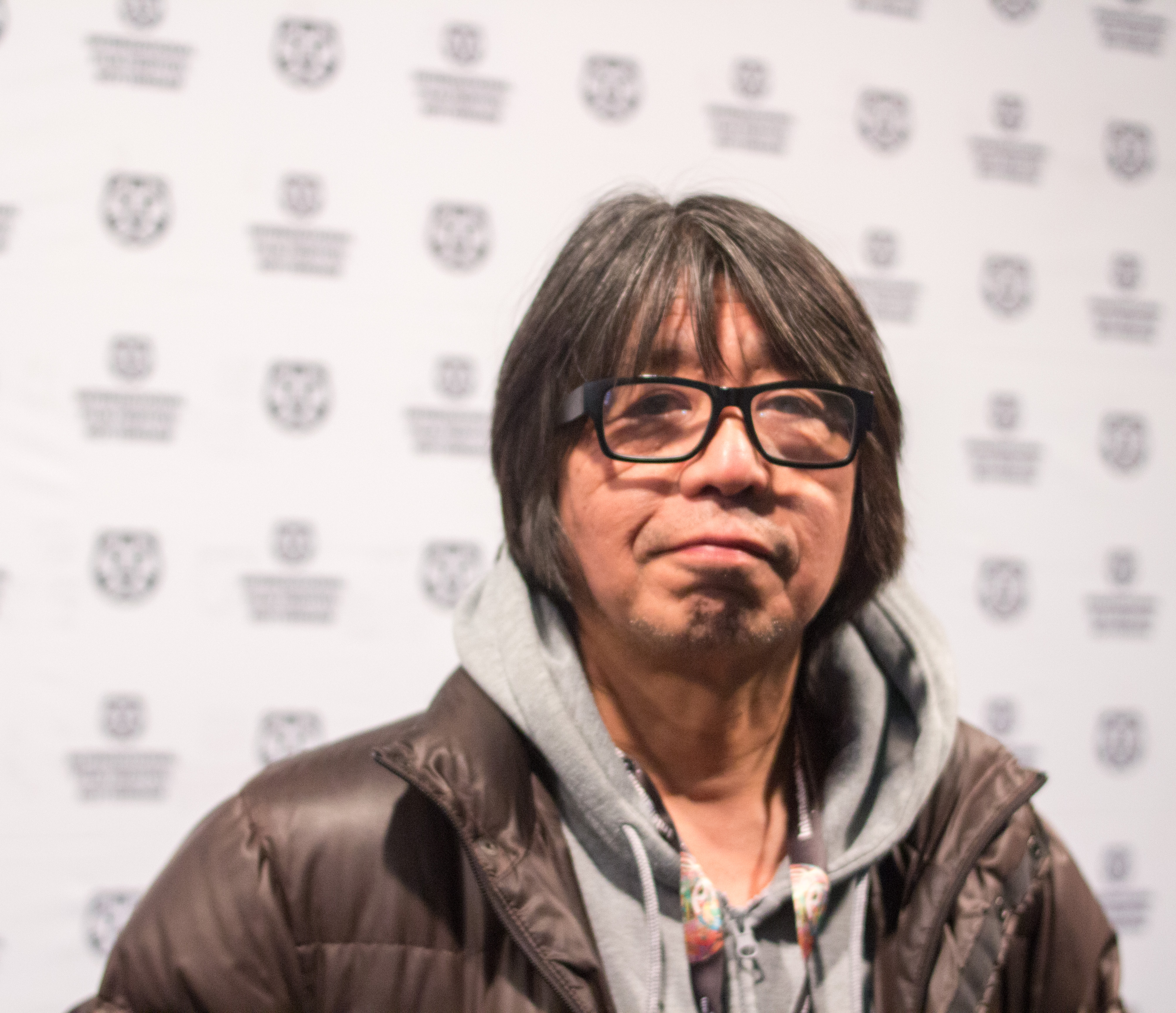
Mori Tatsuya at the premiere of "Fake"

Tatsuya Mori (森 達也, Mori Tatsuya; born 10 May 1956) is a Japanese documentary filmmaker, TV director, and author.

== Career ==
Born in Hiroshima Prefecture, Mori graduated from Rikkyo University, where he appeared in the student films of Kiyoshi Kurosawa. After graduating, he tried acting and even appeared in Kurosawa's feature debut, the pink film Kandagawa Pervert Wars. He worked at other odd jobs before finally finding employment at a TV production company in 1989, where he began working on documentaries. While working freelance or under contract, he made a number of television documentaries before making A (1998) and A2 (2001), two documentary movies about the everyday life of Aum Shinrikyo followers. Aum Shinrikyo is a controversial Japanese religious group most known for its involvement in a series of incidents including the Tokyo subway gas attack. A showed at the Berlin Film Festival, and A2 won two prizes at the 2001 Yamagata International Documentary Film Festival.

One particular scene from A, in which a plainclothes policeman attacks an Aum follower who is then arrested for attacking the actual attacker (Mori was filming from a distance), sparked controversy among the audience watching the film. The footage was later introduced in court and the 'Aum attacker' was acquitted as a result. Filmmaker Mori was accused of staging the improbable incidents and using actors. Some even refused to believe the footage was shot inside the Aum facilities.

When A2, Mori's second controversial film about the cult was completed, the filmmaker declared his unwillingness to return to the Aum theme in the future. By his own admission, the efforts invested in production of the two documentaries did not bring him anything more than financial damage and troubles, due to limited scale of theatrical screening and refusal of TV broadcasting corporations to license the films (Mori refused to allow isolated scenes to be used in video sets to Aum-related news broadcasts). However, in 2010 he wrote a critically acclaimed book on the intervening decade of Aum entitled A3.

While his documentaries on Aum Shinrikyo were very controversial when they were being filmed and shown, Mori is today considered amongst Japan's most talented independent non-fiction filmmakers. His 2001 film 311 is a collaborative work about the aftermath of the Tohoku earthquake.

He has also published many books on social issues and the media.

== Selected filmography ==
- A (1998)
- A2 (2001)
- 311 (2011)
- Fake (2016)
- i: Documentary of the Journalist (2019)
- September 1923 (2023)
