= 20th Busan International Film Festival =

2015 edition of film festival

- Opening film: Zubaan
- Closing film: Mountain Cry
- Location: Busan Cinema Center, Busan, South Korea
- Founded: 1995
- Hosted by: Song Kang-ho; Marina Golbahari
- Festival date: October 1–10, 2015

Busan International Film Festival
- 21st 19th

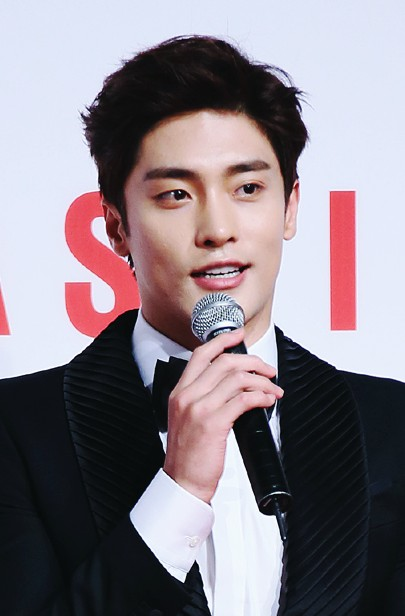
Sung Hoon at Busan International Film Festival, 5 October 2015

The 20th Busan International Film Festival was held from October 1 to October 10, 2015 at South Korea's Busan Cinema Center and was hosted by Song Kang-ho and Marina Golbahari.

In this year's festival, a total of 302 films from 75 countries was screened, with 94 serving as world premieres and 31 serving as international premieres.

The 302 films, which includes films from countries such as Japan, India, the Philippines, Thailand, Indonesia and Iran, were played on 35 screens at six theaters in Busan, including Busan Cinema Center, CGV Centum City, Lotte Cinema Centum City, Dongseo University Sohyang Theater, Megabox Haeundae and Megabox Busan Theater.

== Program ==
=== Opening ===
- Zubaan - Mozez Singh (India)

=== Gala Presentation ===
- A Bigger Splash - Luca Guadagnino (Italy)
- Color of Asia - Masters - Wang Xiaoshuai, Im Sang-soo, Naomi Kawase, Apichatpong Weerasethakul (China/Korea/Japan/Thailand)
- Mountains May Depart - Jia Zhangke (China/Japan/France)
- Our Little Sister - Hirokazu Koreeda (Japan)
- The Assassin - Hou Hsiao-hsien (Taiwan/China/Hong Kong, China/France)
- Un plus une - Claude Lelouch (France)

=== A Window on Asian Cinema ===
- 3000 Nights - Mai Masri (Palestine/France/Jordan/Lebanon/United Arab Emirates/Qatar)
- 3688 - Royston Tan (Singapore )
- 7 Letters - Royston Tan, Tan Pin Pin, Boo Junfeng, Kelvin Tong, Eric Khoo, Jack Neo, K. Rajagopal (Singapore)
- A Copy of My Mind - Joko Anwar (Indonesia)
- A Flag without a Country - Bahman Ghobadi (Iraq)
- A Tale of Three Cities - Mabel Cheung (China)
- Afternoon - Tsai Ming-liang (Taiwan)
- Aligarh - Hansal Mehta (India)
- Avalanche - Morteza Farshbaf (Iran)
- Bad Guys Always Die - Sun Hao (China/Korea)
- Being Good - Mipo O (Japan)
- Big Father, Small Father and Other Stories - Phan Dang Di (Vietnam/France/Germany/Netherlands)
- Blanka - Hasei Kohki (Italy/Philippines/Japan)
- Cemetery of Splendour - Apichatpong Weerasethakul (Thailand/United Kingdom/France/Germany/Malaysia/Korea/Mexico/United States/Norway)
- Chaotic Love Poems - Garin Nugroho (Indonesia)
- Dark in the White Light - Vimukthi Jayasundara (Sri Lanka/France)
- Ever Since We Love - Li Yu (China)
- Farewell, Berlin Wall - Nguyen Phan Quang Binh (Vietnam/Germany)
- Guilty - Meghna Gulzar (India)
- In the Room - Eric Khoo (Hong Kong, China/Singapore)
- Journey to the Shore - Kiyoshi Kurosawa (Japan/France)
- Kothanodi - Bhaskar Hazarika (India)
- Leopard Do Not Bite - Prasanna Jayakody (Sri Lanka)
- Looking for Rohmer - Wang Chao (China/France)
- Masaan - Neeraj Ghaywan (India/France)
- Mother - Jami Mahmood (Pakistan/United States)
- Murmur of the Hearts - Sylvia Chang (Taiwan/Hong Kong, China)
- Nahid - Ida Panahandeh (Iran)
- O Kadhal Kanmani - Mani Ratnam (India)
- Office - Johnnie To (China/Hong Kong, China)
- Orange Candy - Biju Viswanath (India)
- Paradise - Sina Dena Ataeian (Iran/Germany)
- Paths of the Soul - Zhang Yang (China)
- Peace Haven - Suman Ghosh (India)
- Pink and Gray - Isao Yukisada (Japan)
- Sentence Me Guilty - Sun Liang (China)
- Taklub - Brillante Mendoza (Philippines)
- Taxi - Jafar Panahi (Iran)
- Tharlo - Pema Tseden (China)
- The Black Hen - Min Bahadur Bham (Nepal/France/Germany)
- The Idol - Hany Abu-Assad (United Kingdom/Palestine/Qatar/Netherlands/United Arab Emirates)
- The Long Farewell - Farzad Motamen (Iran)
- The Mad King of Taipei - Nelson Yeh (Taiwan)
- The Man Who Became a Horse - Amir Hossein Saghafi (Iran)
- The Sea and the Flying Fish - Mehrdad Ghafarzadeh (Iran)
- The Virgin Psychics - Sion Sono (Japan)
- Three Stories of Love - Ryōsuke Hashiguchi (Japan)
- Toll Bar - Zhassulan Poshanov (Kazakhstan)
- Underground Fragrance - Pengfei (France/China)
- Undertone - Li Ruiqi (China)
- Zinnia Flower - Tom Lin Shu-yu (Taiwan)

=== New Currents ===
- Black Horse Memories - Shahram Alidi (Iran/Turkey)
- Communication & Lies - Lee Seung-won (Korea)
- Go Home - Jihane Chouaib (France/Switzerland/Belgium/Lebanon)
- Immortal - Seyed Hadi Mohaghegh (Iran)
- Night and Fog in Zona - Jung Sung-il (Korea)
- Radio Set - Hari Viswanath (India)
- Walnut Tree - Yerlan Nurmukhambetov (Kazakhstan)
- West North West - Nakamura Takuro (Japan)

=== Korean Cinema Today - Panorama ===
- Fourth Place - Jung Ji-woo (Korea)
- A Break Alone - Cho Jae-hyun (Korea)
- A Korean in Paris - Jeon Soo-il (Korea/France)
- Assassination - Choi Dong-hoon (Korea)
- Circle of Atonement - Park Eun-gyoung, Lee Dong-ha (Korea)
- Love and... - Zhang Lu (Korea)
- Madonna - Shin Su-won (Korea)
- Ode to My Father - Yoon Je-kyoon (Korea)
- Office - Hong Won-chan (Korea)
- One Way Trip - Choi Jeong-yeol (Korea)
- Ordinary People - Kim Byung-June (Korea)
- Proj. Get-up-and-go - Lee Keun-woo (Korea)
- Right Now, Wrong Then - Hong Sang-soo (Korea)
- STOP - Kim Ki-duk - (Korea)
- The Classified File - Kwak Kyung-taek (Korea)
- The Piper - Kim Gwang-tae (Korea)
- The Royal Tailor - Lee Won-suk (Korea)
- The Shameless - Oh Seung-uk (Korea)
- The Silenced - Lee Hae-young (Korea)
- Twenty - Lee Byeong-heon (Korea)
- The Unfair - Kim Sung-je (Korea)
- Twenty Again - Park Heung-sik (Korea)
- Two Rooms, Two Nights - David Cho (Korea)
- Veteran - Ryoo Seung-wan (Korea)

=== Korean Cinema Today - Vision ===
- ALONE - Park Hong-min (Korea)
- Another Night - Choi Yong-suk (Korea)
- Another Way - Cho Chang-ho (Korea)
- Blossom - Kim Jin-do (Korea)
- Eyelids - O Muel (Korea)
- Girl on the Edge (aka School Girl) - Park Geun-buem (Korea)
- Overman - Seo Eun-young (Korea)
- Recording - Park Min-kook (Korea)
- Steel Flower - Park Suk-young (Korea)
- The Battle of Gwangju - Lee Ji-sang (Korea)
- The Boys Who Cried Wolf - Kim Jin-hwang (Korea)

=== Korean Cinema Retrospective ===
==== Hidden Masterpieces of the 1960s ====
- A Bloodthirsty Killer - Lee Yong-min (Korea)
- The Body Confession - Jo Keung-ha (Korea)
- The Cash Is Mine - Lee Sang-eon (Korea)
- The DMZ - Park Sang-ho (Korea)
- The Door of the Body - Lee Bong-rae (Korea)
- The General's Mustache - Lee Sung-gu (Korea)
- Trees Stand on Slope - Choi Ha-won (Korea)
- When Night Falls at Myeongdong - Lee Hyung-pyo (Korea)

=== World Cinema ===
- 11 Minutes - Jerzy Skolimowski (Poland/Ireland)
- Aferim! - Radu Jude (Romania/Bulgaria/Czech Republic)
- Anna - Charles-Olivier Michaud (Canada)
- Arabian Nights Volume 1 - Miguel Gomes (Portugal/France/Germany/Switzerland)
- Arabian Nights Volume 2 - Miguel Gomes (Portugal/France/Germany/Switzerland)
- Arabian Nights Volume 3 - Miguel Gomes (Portugal/France/Germany/Switzerland)
- Blood of My Blood - Marco Bellocchio (Italy/France/Switzerland)
- Body - Małgorzata Szumowska (Poland)
- Chronic - Michel Franco (Mexico)
- Dheepan - Jacques Audiard (France)
- Embrace of the Serpent - Ciro Guerra (Colombia)
- Freeheld - Peter Sollett (United States)
- In the Shadow of Women - Philippe Garrel (France/Switzerland)
- Into the Forest - Patricia Rozema (Canada)
- Jailbirds - Audrey Estrougo (France)
- King of Life - Jerzy Zieliński (Poland)
- Last Cab To Darwin - Jeremy Sims (Australia)
- Louder Than Bombs - Joachim Trier (Norway/France/Denmark)
- Ma Ma - Julio Medem (Spain/France)
- My Golden Days - Arnaud Desplechin (France)
- Paulina - Santiago Mitre (Argentina/Brazil/France)
- Regression - Alejandro Amenábar (Spain/Canada)
- Sicario - Denis Villeneuve (United States)
- Sleeping Giant - Andrew Cividino (Canada)
- Son of Saul - László Nemes (Hungary)
- Summertime - Catherine Corsini (France)
- Tale of Tales - Matteo Garrone (Italy/France)
- Tangerine - Sean S. Baker (United States)
- Tess - Roman Polanski (France/United Kingdom)
- The 33 - Patricia Riggen (United States)
- The Apostate - Federico Veiroj (Spain/France/Uruguay)
- The Brand New Testament - Jaco Van Dormael (Belgium/France/Luxembourg)
- The Companion - Pavel Giroud (Cuba/Colombia/France/Panama/Venezuela)
- Braqueurs - Julien Leclercq (France)
- The Daughter - Simon Stone (Australia)
- The Dressmaker - Jocelyn Moorhouse (Australia)
- The Endless River - Oliver Hermanus (South Africa/France)
- The Final Lesson - Pascale Pouzadoux (France)
- The High Sun - Dalibor Matanić (Croatia/Slovenia/Serbia)
- The Kind Words - Shemi Zarhin - (Israel/Canada)
- The Lobster - Yorgos Lanthimos (United Kingdom/Greece/Ireland)
- The Measure of a Man - Stéphane Brizé (France)
- The People vs. Fritz Bauer - Lars Kraume (Germany)
- The Sweet Escape - Bruno Podalydès (France)
- The Very Private Life of Mister Sim - Michel Leclerc (France)
- The Weather Inside - Isabelle Stever (Germany)
- Truman - Cesc Gay (Spain)
- Urban Hymn - Michael Caton-Jones (United Kingdom)
- Viva - Paddy Breathnach (Ireland)
- Winter Song - Otar Iosseliani (France/Georgia)
- Youth - Paolo Sorrentino (Italy)

=== Flash Forward ===
- As I Open My Eyes - Leyla Bouzid (France/Tunisia/Belgium/United Arab Emirates)
- Babai - Visar Morina (Germany/Kosovo/Macedonia/France)
- Banat - Adriano Valerio (Italy/Bulgaria/Macedonia/Romania)
- Chicken - Joe Stephenson (United Kingdom)
- Clever - Federico Borgia, Guillermo Madeiro (Uruguay)
- Closet Monster - Stephen Dunn (Canada)
- Eye of the Storm - Sékou Traoré (France/Burkina Faso)
- Flocking - Beata Gårdeler (Sweden)
- Frenzy - Emin Alper (Turkey/France/Qatar)
- Highway to Hellas - Aron Lehmann - (Germany)
- Home Care - Slávek Horák (Czech Republic/Slovak Republic)
- Ixcanul - Jayro Bustamante (Guatemala/France)
- Krisha - Trey Edward Shults (United States)
- Lamb - Yared Zeleke (Ethiopia/France/Germany)
- Land and Shade - César Augusto Acevedo (Colombia/France/Spain)
- Les Cowboys - Thomas Bidegain (France)
- Long Live the Bride - Ascanio Celestini (Italy/France)
- Looking for Her - Ounie Lecomte (France)
- Mustang - Deniz Gamze Ergüven (France/Germany/Turkey/Qatar)
- Panama - Pavle Vučković (Serbia)
- Parasol - Valéry Rosier (Belgium)
- Raging Rose - Julia Kowalski (France/Poland)
- Rams - Grímur Hákonarson (Iceland/Denmark)
- Road to La Paz - Francisco Varone (Argentina/Netherlands/Germany/Qatar)
- The Automatic Hate - Justin Lerner (United States)
- The Devout - Connor Gaston (Canada)
- The Exile - Arturo Ruiz Serrano (Spain)
- The Project of the Century - Carlos M. Quintela (Argentina/Cuba/Germany/Switzerland)
- The Summer of Sangailė - Alantė Kavaitė (Lithuania/France/Netherlands)
- The Thin Yellow Line - Celso R. García (Mexico)

=== Wide Angle ===
==== Korean Short Film Competition ====
- A Place Left Behind - Moon Ji-won (Korea)
- Anna - Je Jung-mo (Korea)
- Bargain - Lee Chung-hyun (Korea)
- Boy with Guitar - Kwon Hyo (Korea)
- DESK - Kim You-June (Korea)
- Dishonor - Kim Ui-suk (Korea)
- Family - Chong Seung-hyun (Korea)
- Shame Diary - Lee Eun-jeong (Korea)
- The Chicken of Wuzuh - Byun Sung-bin (Korea)
- The Transfer Student - Park Ji-in (Korea)

==== Asian Short Film Competition ====
- For We Are Strangers - Nicole Midori Woodford (Singapore)
- Hpakant Jade Life - Lee Yong Chao (Taiwan)
- Nia's Door - Lau Kek Huat (Taiwan)
- Octopus - Jaypee Hamoc Jr. (Philippines)
- Opus - Sugita Satoru (Japan)
- Rapture - Nima Farahi (Iran)
- Spring Awakening - Cheng Ya-Chih (Taiwan)
- The Shame - Sushan Prajapati (Nepal)
- Three Wheels - Neang Kavich (Cambodia/France)
- Time to Die - Wang Tong (China)

==== Short Film Showcase ====
- Ave Maria - Basil Khalil (Palestine/France/Germany)
- Color of Asia - Newcomers - Asmita Shrish, Fateme Ahmadi, Phuttiphong Aroonpheng, Cheng Liang, Lee Han-jong (China/Korea/Nepal/Thailand)
- Dancing Cat - Min Yong-keun (Korea)
- Durga - Vivek Kajaria (India)
- Junilyn Has - Carlo Francisco Manatad (Philippines)
- Life on the Border - Hazem Khodeide, Zohur Saeid, Basmeh Soleiman, Delovan Kekha, Diar Omar, Mahmod Ahmad, Rounahi Ezaddin, Sami Hossein (Syria/Iraq)
- Love Story Not - Yosep Anggi Noen (Indonesia)
- RED EYE - Yoon Eun-hye - (Korea)
- The Audition - Martin Scorsese (United States)
- The Best Director - Moon So-ri (Korea)
- Where Mermaids Go - Kim Tae-yong (Korea)
- William Wilson - Emmanuel Ollivier (France)

==== Documentary Competition ====
- Boys Run - Kang Seok-pil (Korea)
- Fireflies in the Abyss - Chandrasekhar Reddy (India/United Kingdom)
- Look Love - Ye Yun (China)
- Reach For The SKY - Choi Woo-young, Steven Dhoedt (Korea/Belgium)
- Shahrzaad's Tale - Shahin Parhami (Iran/Canada/Korea)
- Still and All - Kim Young-jo (Korea)
- Twenty Two - Guo Ke (China/Korea)
- We Shall Overcome - Mikami Chie (Japan)
- Where am I?: Beyond Girl and Woman - Kim Hyo-jung (Korea)
- Zen and Bones - Nakamura Takayuki (Japan)

==== Documentary Showcase ====
- A Young Patriot - Du Haibin (China/France/United States)
- Ashes to Ashes - Shin Sang-hoon (Korea)
- Beyond My Grandfather Allende - Marcia Tambutti Allende (Chile/Mexico)
- Drifting City - Kim Jeong (Korea)
- Francofonia - Alexander Sokurov (France/Germany/Netherlands)
- Grozny Blues - Nicola Bellucci - (Switzerland)
- Hong Kong Trilogy: Preschooled Preoccupied Preposterous - Christopher Doyle (Hong Kong, China)
- Horizon - Friðrik Þór Friðriksson, Bergur Bernburg (Iceland/Denmark)
- Ice and the Sky - Luc Jacquet (France)
- In Jackson Heights - Frederick Wiseman (United States)
- Jai Ho - Umesh Aggarwal (India)
- Jia Zhangke, a Guy from Fenyang - Walter Salles (Brazil)
- My Land - Fan Jian (China)
- Special Annie - Kim Hyun-kyung (Korea/United States)
- The Dream of Shahrazad - François Verster (South Africa/Egypt/France/Netherlands/Jordan)
- The Master - Nawapol Thamrongrattanarit (Thailand)
- The Other Side - Roberto Minervini (Italy/France)
- The Pearl Button - Patricio Guzmán (Chile/France/Spain)
- Twinsters - Samantha Futerman, Ryan Miyamoto (United States/Korea/United Kingdom)

==== Cinekids ====
- Boonie Bears: Mystical Winter - Leon Ding (China)
- Dumbo - Ben Sharpsteen (United States)
- Rainbow - Nagesh Kukunoor (India)
- Raven the Little Rascal - The Big Race - Sandor Jesse, Ute von Münchow-Pohl (Germany)
- The Incredible Story of the Stone Boy - Miguel Uriegas, Miguel Bonilla, Jaime Romandía, Pablo Aldrete (Mexico)
- Trenk, the Little Knight - Anthony Power (Germany/Austria)

==== Animation Showcase ====
- Adama - Simon Rouby (France)
- Cafard - Jan Bultheel (Belgium/France/Netherlands)
- Long Way North - Rémi Chayé (France/Denmark)
- Only Yesterday - Isao Takahata (Japan)
- The Magic Mountain - Anca Damian (Romania/Poland/France)

=== Open Cinema ===
- Baahubali: The Beginning - S. S. Rajamouli - (India)
- Brother Bajrangi - Kabir Khan - (India)
- Collective Invention - Kwon Oh-kwang - (Korea)
- Courted - Christian Vincent - (France)
- Monster Hunt - Raman Hui - (Hong Kong, China)
- My Neighbor Totoro - Hayao Miyazaki - (Japan)
- Our Times - Frankie Chen - (Taiwan)
- The Wait - Piero Messina - (Italy)

=== Special Programs in Focus ===
==== Asian Cinema 100 ====
- A Brighter Summer Day - Edward Yang (Taiwan)
- A City of Sadness - Hou Hsiao-hsien (Taiwan)
- Pather Panchali - Satyajit Ray (India)
- Close-Up - Abbas Kiarostami (Iran)
- Rashomon - Akira Kurosawa (Japan)
- Seven Samurai - Akira Kurosawa (Japan)
- Spring in a Small Town - Fei Mu (China)
- Still Life - Jia Zhangke (China)
- The Housemaid - Kim Ki-young (Korea )
- Tokyo Story - Yasujirō Ozu (Japan)

(For the top 100 Asian films of all time, see Asian Cinema 100 Ranking)

==== My French Cinema ====
- A Man and a Woman - Claude Lelouch (France)
- A Prophet - Jacques Audiard (France)
- A Room in Town - Jacques Demy (France)
- Bad Blood - Leos Carax (France)
- Bellamy - Claude Chabrol (France)
- Holy Motors - Leos Carax (France)
- Just for Laughs - Lucas Belvaux (France)
- Marianne of My Youth - Julien Duvivier (France)
- My Sex Life... or How I Got into an Argument - Arnaud Desplechin (France)
- Summer Hours - Olivier Assayas (France)

=== Midnight Passion ===
- Backtrack - Michael Petroni (United Kingdom/Australia)
- Convergence - Drew Hall (United States)
- Ghost Theater - Hideo Nakata (Japan)
- Green Room - Jeremy Saulnier (United States)
- Made in France - Nicolas Boukhrief (France)
- Litchi Hikari Club - Eisuke Naito (Japan)
- Numb - Jason R. Goode (Canada)
- SPL II: A Time for Consequences - Cheang Pou-soi (Hong Kong, China/China)
- Summer Camp - Alberto Marini (Spain/United States)
- The Hallow - Corin Hardy (United Kingdom)
- The Invitation - Karyn Kusama (United States)
- The Visit - M. Night Shyamalan (United States )

=== Closing ===
- Mountain Cry - Larry Yang (China/United States)

== Awards ==
- New Currents Award
  - Immortal - Seyed Hadi Mohaghegh (Iran)
  - Walnut Tree - Yerlan Nurmukhambetov (Kazakhstan)
- BIFF Mecenat Award
  - Boys Run - Kang Seok-pil (Korea)
  - Look Love - Ye Yun (China)
  - Special Mention: Still and All - Kim Young-jo (Korea)
- Sonje Award
  - Shame Diary - Lee Eun-jeong (Korea)
  - Nia's Door - Lau Kek Huat (Taiwan)
- Actor & Actress of the Year Award
  - Lee Ju-won - ALONE (Korea)
  - Sun Jang - Communication & Lies (Korea)
- FIPRESCI Award
  - Immortal - Seyed Hadi Mohaghegh (Iran)
- NETPAC Award
  - Communication & Lies - Lee Seung-won (Korea)
- Daemyung Culture Wave Award
  - Overman - Seo Eun-young (Korea)
- KNN Award
  - Radio Set - Hari Viswanath (India)
- Busan Bank Award
  - Highway to Hellas - Aron Lehmann (Germany)
- Citizen Critics’ Award
  - ALONE - Park Hong-min (Korea)
- Busan Cinephile Award
  - The Other Side - Roberto Minervini (Italy/France)
- CGV Arthouse Award
  - Eyelids - O Muel (Korea)
- DGK Award
  - The Boys Who Cried Wolf - Kim Jin-hwang (Korea)
  - Eyelids - O Muel (Korea)
- The Asian Filmmaker of the Year
  - Studio Ghibli (Japan)
- Korean Cinema Award
  - Wieland Speck (German)

== Asian Cinema 100 ==
Asian Cinema 100 ranks top 100 Asian films of all time and it was completed with the help from directors, critics, film scholars, and journalists from various countries. 73 film professionals participated in the project with a total of 113 films (including joint rankings) and 106 directors listed in the "Asian Cinema Directors 100". It will be updated every 5 years and is expected to focus more attention and studies on Asian films.

=== Asian Cinema 100 Ranking ===
Rank	Title	Director	Year	Country
1	Tokyo Story	Yasujirō Ozu	1953	Japan
2	Rashomon	Akira Kurosawa	1950	Japan
3	In the Mood for Love	Wong Kar-wai	2000	Hong Kong
4	The Apu Trilogy	Satyajit Ray	1955; 1957; 1959	India
5	A City of Sadness	Hou Hsiao-hsien	1989	Taiwan
6	Seven Samurai	Akira Kurosawa	1954	Japan
7	A Brighter Summer Day	Edward Yang	1991	Taiwan
8	Spring in a Small Town	Fei Mu	1948	China
8	Still Life	Jia Zhangke	2006	China
10	The Housemaid	Kim Ki-young	1960	Korea
10	Close-Up	Abbas Kiarostami	1990	Iran
12	Yi Yi	Edward Yang	2000	Taiwan
12	Spring, Summer, Fall, Winter... and Spring	Kim Ki-duk	2003	Korea
12	Oldboy	Park Chan-wook	2003	Korea
15	Late Spring	Yasujirō Ozu	1949	Japan
15	Taste of Cherry	Abbas Kiarostami	1998	Iran
15	Uncle Boonmee Who Can Recall His Past Lives	Apichatpong Weerasethakul	2010	Thailand
18	Ugetsu Monogatari	Kenji Mizoguchi	1953	Japan
18	The Music Room	Satyajit Ray	1958	India
18	The Cloud-Capped Star	Ritwik Ghatak	1960	India
18	Where Is the Friend's Home?	Abbas Kiarostami	1987	Iran
18	Raise the Red Lantern	Zhang Yimou	1991	China
18	Seopyeonje	Im Kwon-taek	1993	Korea
18	Crouching Tiger, Hidden Dragon	Ang Lee	2000	Taiwan
18	Spirited Away	Hayao Miyazaki	2001	Japan
18	Tropical Malady	Apichatpong Weerasethakul	2004	Thailand
18	Mother	Bong Joon-ho	2008	Korea
18	Poetry	Lee Chang-dong	2010	Korea
18	A Separation	Asghar Farhadi	2011	Iran
30	A Touch of Zen	King Hu	1969	Taiwan
30	Manila in the Claws of Light	Lino Brocka	1975	Philippines
30	Mandala	Im Kwon-taek	1981	Korea
30	A Moment of Innocence	Mohsen Makhmalbaf	1996	Iran
30	Happy Together	Wong Kar-wai	1997	Hong Kong
30	The River	Tsai Ming-liang	1997	Taiwan
30	Blissfully Yours	Apichatpong Weerasethakul	2002	Thailand
37	Awara	Raj Kapoor	1951	India
37	Floating Clouds	Mikio Naruse	1955	Japan
37	Pyaasa	Guru Dutt	1957	India
37	The Lonely Wife	Satyajit Ray	1964	India
37	The Cow	Dariush Mehrjui	1969	Iran
37	Red Sorghum	Zhang Yimou	1987	China
37	Days of Being Wild	Wong Kar-wai	1990	Hong Kong
37	Farewell My Concubine	Chen Kaige	1993	China
37	Vive L'Amour	Tsai Ming-liang	1994	Taiwan
37	The Adopted Son	Aktan Abdykalykov	1998	Kyrgyzstan
37	Peppermint Candy	Lee Chang-dong	1999	Korea
48	I Was Born, But...	Yasujirō Ozu	1932	Japan
48	The Story of the Last Chrysanthemums	Kenji Mizoguchi	1939	Japan
48	Living	Akira Kurosawa	1952	Japan
48	Sansho the Bailiff	Kenji Mizoguchi	1954	Japan
48	The House Is Black	Forough Farrokhzad	1963	Iran
48	The Woman in the Dunes	Hiroshi Teshigahara	1964	Japan
48	Scattered Clouds	Mikio Naruse	1967	Japan
48	Daughter-In-Law	Khodzhakuli Narliev	1972	Turkmenistan
48	Dersu Uzala	Akira Kurosawa	1975	Japan
48	In the Realm of the Senses	Nagisa Oshima	1976	Japan
48	The Time to Live and the Time to Die	Hou Hsiao-hsien	1985	Taiwan
48	Through the Olive Trees	Abbas Kiarostami	1994	Iran
48	Children of Heaven	Majid Majidi	1997	Iran
48	Osama	Siddiq Barmak	2003	Afghanistan
48	Tie Xi Qu: West of the Tracks	Wang Bing	2003	China
48	Paradise Now	Hany Abu-Assad	2005	Palestine
48	Mukhsin	Yasmin Ahmad	2006	Malaysia
48	Secret Sunshine	Lee Chang-dong	2007	Korea
66	The Goddess	Wu Yonggang	1934	China
66	Humanity and Paper Balloons	Sadao Yamanaka	1937	Japan
66	Street Angel	Yuan Muzhi	1937	China
66	The Life of Oharu	Kenji Mizoguchi	1952	Japan
66	Mother India	Mehboob Khan	1957	India
66	Floating Weeds	Yasujirō Ozu	1958	Japan
66	Good Morning	Yasujirō Ozu	1959	Japan
66	Paper Flowers	Guru Dutt	1959	India
66	The Naked Island	Kaneto Shindo	1960	Japan
66	Intentions of Murder	Shohei Imamura	1964	Japan
66	A Man Vanishes	Shohei Imamura	1967	Japan
66	A Day Off	Lee Man-hee	1968	Korea
66	The Cruel Sea	Khalid Al Siddiq	1972	Kuwait
66	Insiang	Lino Brocka	1976	Philippines
66	Vengeance Is Mine	Shohei Imamura	1979	Japan
66	Batch '81	Mike De Leon	1982	Philippines
66	Taipei Story	Edward Yang	1984	Taiwan
66	The Runner	Amir Naderi	1985	Iran
66	My Neighbor Totoro	Hayao Miyazaki	1988	Japan
66	Ju Dou	Zhang Yimou	1990	China
66	Life, and Nothing More...	Abbas Kiarostami	1992	Iran
66	The Puppetmaster	Hou Hsiao-hsien	1993	Taiwan
66	Chungking Express	Wong Kar-wai	1994	Hong Kong
66	The Scent of Green Papaya	Tran Anh Hung	1994	Vietnam, France
66	Gabbeh	Mohsen Makhmalbaf	1995	Iran
66	The White Balloon	Jafar Panahi	1995	Iran
66	The Day a Pig Fell into the Well	Hong Sang-soo	1996	Korea
66	Hana-bi	Takeshi Kitano	1997	Japan
66	Flowers of Shanghai	Hou Hsiao-hsien	1998	Taiwan
66	Chunhyang	Im Kwon-taek	1999	Korea
66	The Color of Paradise	Majid Majidi	1999	Iran
66	A Poet	Garin Nugroho	1999	Indonesia
66	Blackboards	Samira Makhmalbaf	2000	Iran
66	The Circle	Jafar Panahi	2000	Iran
66	The Day I Became a Woman	Marzieh Meshkini	2000	Iran
66	Devils on the Doorstep	Jiang Wen	2000	China
66	Platform	Jia Zhangke	2000	China
66	Kandahar	Mohsen Makhmalbaf	2001	Iran
66	Sympathy for Mr. Vengeance	Park Chan-wook	2002	Korea
66	The Wind Will Carry Us	Abbas Kiarostami	2002	Iran
66	Memories of Murder	Bong Joon-ho	2003	Korea
66	The World	Jia Zhangke	2004	China
66	Bright Future	Kiyoshi Kurosawa	2004	Japan
66	The Host	Bong Joon-ho	2006	Korea
66	Melancholia	Lav Diaz	2008	Philippines
66	Wadjda	Haifaa al-Mansour	2012	Saudi Arabia
66	Ilo Ilo	Anthony Chen	2013	Singapore
66	The Owners	Adilkhan Yerzhanov	2014	Kazakhstan

=== Asian Cinema Directors 100 Ranking ===
Rank	Director	Country
1	Yasujirō Ozu	Japan
2	Hou Hsiao-hsien	Taiwan
3	Abbas Kiarostami	Iran
4	Akira Kurosawa	Japan
5	Satyajit Ray	India
6	Wong Kar-wai	Hong Kong
6	Apichatpong Weerasethakul	Thailand
8	Jia Zhangke	China
8	Kenji Mizoguchi	Japan
8	Edward Yang	Taiwan
11	Zhang Yimou	China
12	Tsai Ming-liang	Taiwan
13	Kim Ki-duk	Korea
13	Ritwik Ghatak	India
15	Im Kwon-taek	Korea
16	Lee Chang-dong	Korea
16	Lino Brocka	Philippines
18	Hong Sang-soo	Korea
18	Mikio Naruse	Japan
20	Nagisa Oshima	Japan
20	King Hu	Hong Kong
22	Mohsen Makhmalbaf	Iran
23	Hayao Miyazaki	Japan
24	Shohei Imamura	Japan
24	Takeshi Kitano	Japan
26	Kim Ki-young	Korea
26	Jafar Panahi	Iran
26	Ang Lee	Taiwan
26	Bong Joon-ho	Korea
26	Lav Diaz	Philippines
26	Rithy Panh	Cambodia-France
32	Park Chan-wook	Korea
32	Jiang Wen	China
32	Asghar Farhadi	Iran
32	Tsui Hark	Hong Kong
32	John Woo	Hong Kong
32	Majid Majidi	Iran
32	Lester James Peries	Sri Lanka
32	Dariush Mehrjui	Iran
32	Gerardo de León	Philippines
41	Aktan Abdykalykov	Kyrgyzstan
41	Yoji Yamada	Japan
41	Yasmin Ahmad	Malaysia
41	Shin Sang-ok	Korea
41	Sadao Yamanaka	Japan
41	Raj Kapoor	India
41	Hany Abu-Assad	Israel
41	Tran Anh Hung	Vietnam
41	P. Ramlee	Malaysia
41	Sun Yu	China
41	Brillante Mendoza	Philippines
41	Wang Bing	China
41	Adoor Gopalakrishnan	India
41	Chen Kaige	China
41	Fei Mu	China
41	Guru Dutt	India
41	Ishmael Bernal	Philippines
41	Anurag Kashyap	India
41	Masaki Kobayashi	Japan
41	Darezhan Omirbaev	Kazakhstan
41	Lee Man-hee	Korea
62	Chang Cheh	China
62	Kiyoshi Kurosawa	Japan
62	Garin Nugroho	Indonesia
62	Mehboob Khan	India
62	Juzo Itami	Japan
62	Tolomush Okeyev	Kyrgyzstan
62	Shaken Aimanov	Kazakhstan
62	Seijun Suzuki	Japan
62	Forough Farrokhzad	Iran
62	Adilkhan Yerzhanov	Kazakhstan
62	Siddiq Barmak	Afghanistan
62	Zhang Yuan	China
62	Rustem Abdrashev	Kazakhstan
62	Davlat Khudonazarov	Tajikistan
62	Khodzhakuli Narliev	Turkmenistan
62	Elyor Ishmuhamedov	Uzbekistan
62	Li Han-hsiang	Hong Kong
62	Bahram Beyzai	Iran
62	Jang Sun-woo	Korea
62	Vichit Kounavudhi	Thailand
62	Lu Ban	China
62	Lo Wei	Hong Kong
62	Kon Ichikawa	Japan
62	Naomi Kawase	Japan
62	Ziad Doueiri	Lebanon
62	Karazan Kader	Iraq
62	Hirokazu Koreeda	Japan
62	Đặng Nhật Minh	Vietnam
62	Rattana Pestonji	Thailand
62	G. Aravindan	India
62	Hiroshi Shimizu	Japan
62	Hussein Haniff	Singapore
62	Mike De Leon	Philippines
62	Lamberto V. Avellana	Philippines
62	Mario O'Hara	Philippines
62	Johnnie To	Hong Kong
62	Stephen Chow	Hong Kong
62	Ann Hui	Hong Kong
62	Tan Pin Pin	Singapore
62	Amir Naderi	Iran
62	Mira Nair	India
62	Elia Suleiman	Israel
62	Kidlat Tahimik	Philippines
