= Busan International Film Festival =

Annual film festival held in Busan, South Korea

Coordinates: 35°09′43″N 129°09′50″E

- Busan International Film Festival Logo
- Location: Busan, South Korea
- Founded: 13 September 1996; 30 years ago
- Most recent: 2025
- Awards received: UNESCO Fellini Award (2007); UNESCO Creative Cities of film (2014); The most prestigious film festival in Asia Time (USA)
- Awards: The Asian Filmmaker of the Year; Korean Cinema Award; Camellia Award; Busan Awards; New Currents
- No. of films: 241 in 2025
- Language: International
- Website: www.biff.kr/kor/

Current: 30th
- 31st 29th

- Busan International Film Festival
- Hangul: 부산국제영화제
- Hanja: 釜山國際映畫祭
- RR: Busan gukje yeonghwaje
- MR: Pusan kukche yŏnghwaje

The Busan International Film Festival (BIFF; Korean: 부산국제영화제), formerly the Pusan International Film Festival (PIFF), held annually in Haeundae District, Busan, South Korea, is one of the most significant film festivals in Asia. The first festival, held from 13 to 21 September 1996, was also the first international film festival in Korea.

The main focus of the BIFF is to introduce new films and first-time directors, especially those from Asian countries. Another notable feature is the appeal of the festival to young people, both in terms of the large youthful audience it attracts and through its efforts to develop and promote young talent.

In 1999, the Pusan Promotion Plan (renamed Asian Project Market in 2011) was established to connect new directors to funding sources. The 16th BIFF in 2011 saw the festival move to a new permanent home, the Busan Cinema Center in Centum City.

For the 99th Academy Awards, Academy of Motion Picture Arts and Sciences (AMPAS) introduced a new eligibility pathway for the International Feature Film category through six designated international film festivals and BIFF is the only Asia-based festival included among the qualifying festivals, alongside Cannes, Berlin, Venice, Sundance, and Toronto. BIFF was also recognized as an "A Festival" under the revised accreditation framework of the International Federation of Film Producers Associations (FIAPF) and is one of 17 film festivals worldwide to hold the designation.

== History ==
=== 1990s ===
- 1st Busan International Film Festival, 13–21 September 1996

Films screened: 173 films from 31 countries
Opening Film: Secrets & Lies, Mike Leigh, UK/France
Closing Film: In Expectation, Ming Zhang, China
Participating guests: 224 guests from 27 countries
Total audience: 184,071

- 2nd Busan International Film Festival, 10–18 October 1997

Films screened: 163 films from 33 countries
Opening Film: Chinese Box, Wayne Wang, UK/France/USA/Japan
Closing Film: Eighteen Springs, Ann Hui, Hong Kong-China
Participating guests: 450 guests from 30 countries
Total audience: 170,206

- 3rd Busan International Film Festival, 24 September – 1 October 1998

Films screened: 211 films from 41 countries
Opening Film: The Silence, Mohsen Makhmalbaf, Iran/France
Closing Film: Kanzo sensei, Shohei Imamura, Japan
Participating guests: 659 guests from 25 countries
Total audience: 192,547 (paid audiences: 174,870)

- 4th Busan International Film Festival, 14–23 October 1999

Films screened: 207 films from 53 countries
Opening Film: Peppermint Candy, Lee Chang-Dong, Korea
Closing Film: Not One Less, Zhang Yimou, China
Participating guests: 555 guests from 36 countries
Total audience: 180,914

=== 2000s ===
- 5th Busan International Film Festival, 6–14 October 2000

Films screened: 207 films from 55 countries
Opening Film: The Wrestlers, Buddhadeb Dasgupta, India
Closing Film: In the Mood for Love, Wong Kar-wai, Hong Kong-China
Participating guests: 3017 guests from 39 countries
Total audience: 181,708 people

- 6th Busan International Film Festival, 9–17 November 2001

Films screened: 201 films from 60 countries
Opening Film: The Last Witness, Bae Chang-ho, Korea
Closing Film: The Legend of Suriyothai, Chatrichalerm Yukol, Thailand
Participating guests: 3,761 guests from 30 countries
Total audience: 143,103 people

- 7th Busan International Film Festival, 14–23 November 2002

Films screened: 226 films from 57 countries
Opening Film: The Coast Guard, Kim Ki-duk, Korea
Closing Film: Dolls, Kitano Takeshi, Japan
Participating guests: 4,387 guests from 35 countries
Total audience: 167,349 people

- 8th Busan International Film Festival, 2–10 October 2003

Films screened: 243 works from 61 countries
Opening Film: Doppelganger, Kiyoshi Kurosawa, Japan
Closing Film: Acacia, Park Ki-hyung, Korea
Participating guests: 2,523 people from 44 countries
Invited guests: 4,387 people from 50 countries (Inc. PPP& Press)
Total audience: 165,102(paid audiences: 145,041)

- 9th Busan International Film Festival, 7–15 October 2004

Films screened: Total 262 films from 63 countries
Opening Film: 2046, Wong Kar-wai, Hong Kong-China
Closing Film: The Scarlet Letter, Daniel H. Byun, Korea
Participating guests: Total 5,638 guests from 50 countries
Total audience: 166,164

- 10th Busan International Film Festival, 6–14 October 2005

Films screened: 307 films from 73 countries
Opening Film: Three Times, Hou Hsiao-hsien, Taiwan
Closing Film: Wedding Campaign, Hwang Byung-kook, Korea
Participating guests: 6,088 from 55 countries
Total audience: 192,970

- 11th Busan International Film Festival, 12–20 October 2006

Films screened: 245 films from 63 countries
Opening Film: Traces of Love, Kim Dae-seung, Korea
Closing Film: Crazy Stone, Ning Hao, China/Hong Kong-China
Participating guests: 8,321 from 51 countries (inc. ASIAN FILM MARKET & press)
Total audience: 162,835

- 12th Busan International Film Festival, 4–12 October 2007

Films Screened: 271 films from 64 countries in 770 screenings
Opening Film: Assembly, Feng Xiaogang, China
Closing Film: Evangelion 1.0: You Are (Not) Alone, Kazuya Tsurumaki, Hideaki Anno, Masayuki, Japan
Participating guests: 7,361(exc. ASIAN FILM MARKET)
Total audience: 198,603

- 13th Busan International Film Festival, 2–10 October 2008

Films screened: 315 films from 60 countries. 827 screenings.
Opening Film: The Gift to Stalin, Rustem Abdrashev, Russia/Kazakhstan/Israel/Poland
Closing Film: I Am Happy, Yoon Jong-chan, Korea
Participating guests: 11,110 in total (inc. ASIAN FILM MARKET)
Total audience: 198,818

- 14th Busan International Film Festival, 8–16 October 2009

Films Screened: 355 films from 70 countries. 803 screenings.
World Premiere: 98 Films (72 Feature Films, 26 Short Films)
International Premiere: 46 Films (41 Feature Films, 5 Short Films)
Opening Film: Good Morning President, Jang Jin, Korea
Closing Film: The Message, Gao Qunshu, Chen Kuo-fu, China
Invited Guests (exc. Asian Film Market): 8,602 in total (Guests: 6,400, Press: 2,202)
Total audience: 173,516

=== 2010s ===
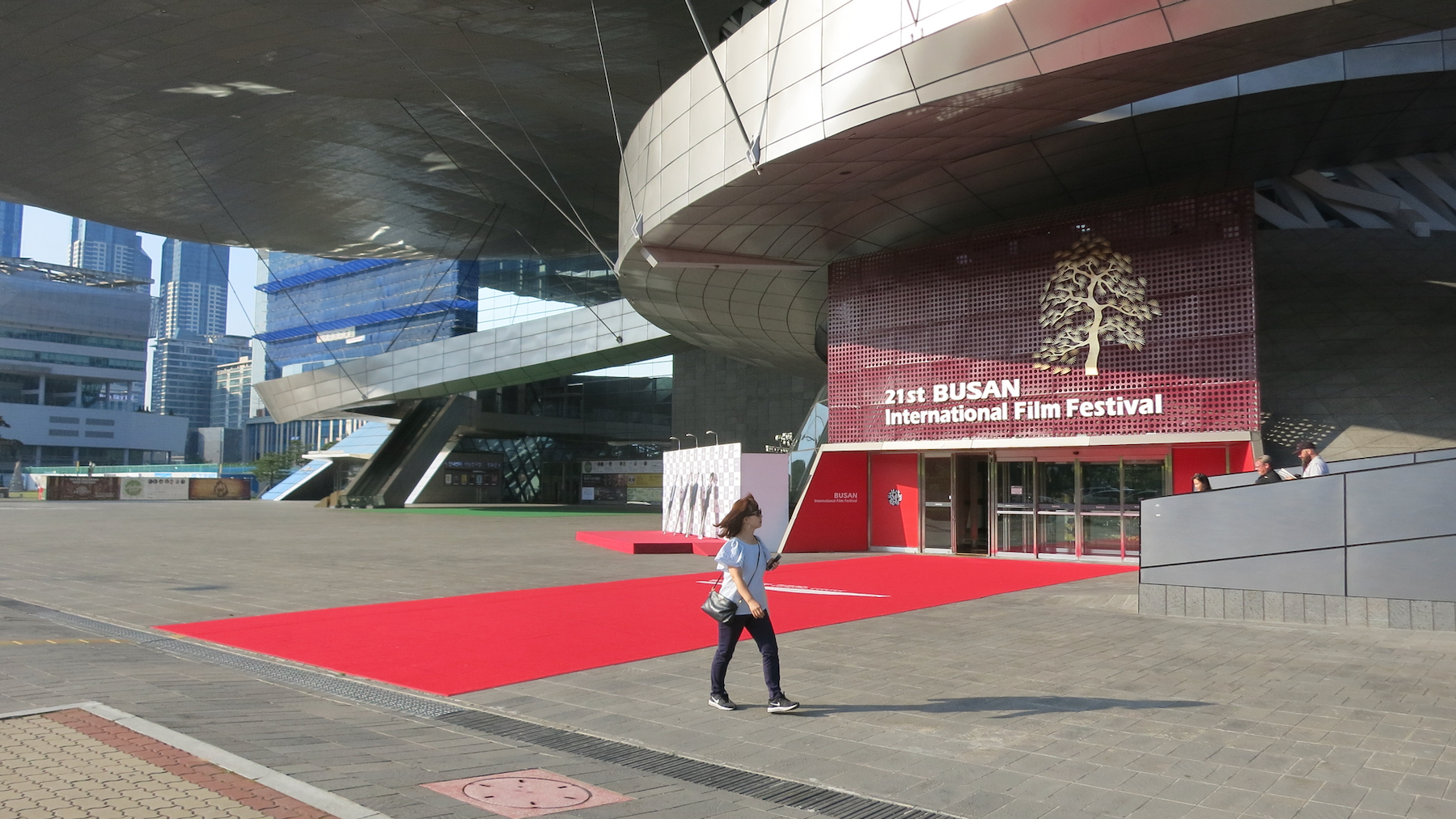
Entrance to BIFF Cone with 2016 branding

- 15th Busan International Film Festival, 7–15 October 2010

Films Screened: 306 films from 67 countries（101 World Premieres / 52 International Premieres）
Screening Venue: Total of 232,851 seats and 36 screens at 6 theaters
Opening Film: Under the Hawthorn Tree, Zhang Yimou, China
Closing Film: Camellia, Wisit Sasanatieng, Isao Yukisada, Jang Joon-hwan, Thailand/Japan/Korea
Participating guests: 9,367
3,784 from Korea
906 from out of Korea
1,651 Cinephiles
789 Market participants
2,237 Press Accreditations
Total audience: 182,046

- 16th Busan International Film Festival, 6–14 October 2011

Films Screened: 307 films from 70 countries（86 World Premieres / 45 International Premieres）
Screening Venue: Total of 235,907 seats and 36 screens at 5 theaters
Opening Film: Always, Song Il-gon, South Korea
Closing Film: Chronicle of My Mother, Masato Harada, Japan
Participating guests: 11,268
Domestic: 4,482
International: 765
Cinephile: 1,999
Market: 1,080
Busan Cinema Forum: 502
Accredited Press: 2,440
* Market and Forum participants include only the numbers accredited with the Badge
Total audience: 196,177

- 17th Busan International Film Festival, 4–13 October 2012

Films Screened: 304 films from 75 countries（96 World Premieres / 39 International Premieres）
Screening Venue: 37 screens at 7 theaters
Opening Film: Cold War, Longman Leung, Sunny Luk, Hong Kong
Closing Film: Television, Mostofa Sarwar Farooki, Bangladesh
Participating guests: 11,519
Domestic: 4,830
International: 806
Cinephile: 2,149
Market: 1,098
Busan Cinema Forum: 279
Accredited Press: 2,357
Total audience: 221,002

- 18th Busan International Film Festival, 3–12 October 2013

Films Screened: 299 films from 70 countries（94 World Premieres / 40 International Premieres）
Screening Venue: 35 screens at 7 theaters (Market and unofficial screenings excluded)
Opening Film: Vara: A Blessing, Khyentse Norbu, Bhutan
Closing Film: The Dinner, Kim Dong-hyun, Korea
Participating guests: 9,991
Domestic: 3,423
Foreign: 751
Cinephile: 1,667
Market: 1,272
BC&F: 616
Accredited Press: 2,262（Domestic: 1,963, Foreign:299）
Total audience: 217,865

- 19th Busan International Film Festival, 2–11 October 2014

Films Screened: 312 from 79 countries（96 World Premieres / 36 International Premieres）
Screening Venue: 33 screens at 7 theaters (Market and unofficial screenings excluded)
Opening Film: Paradise in Service, Doze Niu, Taiwan
Closing Film: Gangster Payday, Lee Po-cheung, Hong Kong
Participating guests: 10,173
Domestic: 3,362
Foreign: 775
Cinephile: 1,429
Market: 1,566
BC&F: 750
Accredited Press: 2,291
Total audience: 226,473

- 20th Busan International Film Festival, 1–10 October 2015

Films Screened: 302 from 75 countries（94 World Premieres / 31 International Premieres）
Screening Venue: 35 screens at 6 theaters (Market and unofficial screenings excluded)
Opening Film: Zubaan, Mozez Singh, India
Closing Film: Mountain Cry, Larry Yang, China/United States
Participating guests: 9,685
Domestic: 3,226
Foreign: 775
Cinephile: 1,405
Market: 1,571
BC&F: 403
Accredited Press: 2,325
Total audience: 227,377

- 21st Busan International Film Festival, 6–15 October 2016

Films Screened: 299 from 69 countries
Opening Film: A Quiet Dream – Zhang Lu, Korea
Closing Film: The Dark Wind, Hussein Hassan, Iraq/Germany/Qatar
Participating guests: 5,759, excluding the press
Total audience: 165,149

- 22nd Busan International Film Festival, 12–21 October 2017

Films Screened: 300 from 76 countries
Opening Film: Glass Garden – Shin Su-won, South Korea
Closing Film: Love Education, Sylvia Chang, China/Taiwan
Total audience: 192,991

- 23rd Busan International Film Festival, 4–13 October 2018

Films Screened: 324 from 79 countries
Opening Film: Beautiful Days - Jéro Yun, South Korea
Closing Film: Master Z: The Ip Man Legacy, Yuen Woo-ping, Hong Kong/China
Total audience: 191,000

- 24th Busan International Film Festival, 3–12 October 2019

Films Screened: 299 from 85 countries
Opening Film: The Horse Thieves. Roads of Time - Yerlan Nurmukhambetov, Lisa Takeba, Kazakhstan/Japan
Closing Film: Moonlit Winter - Lim Dae-hyung, South Korea
Total audience: 189,116

=== 2020s ===
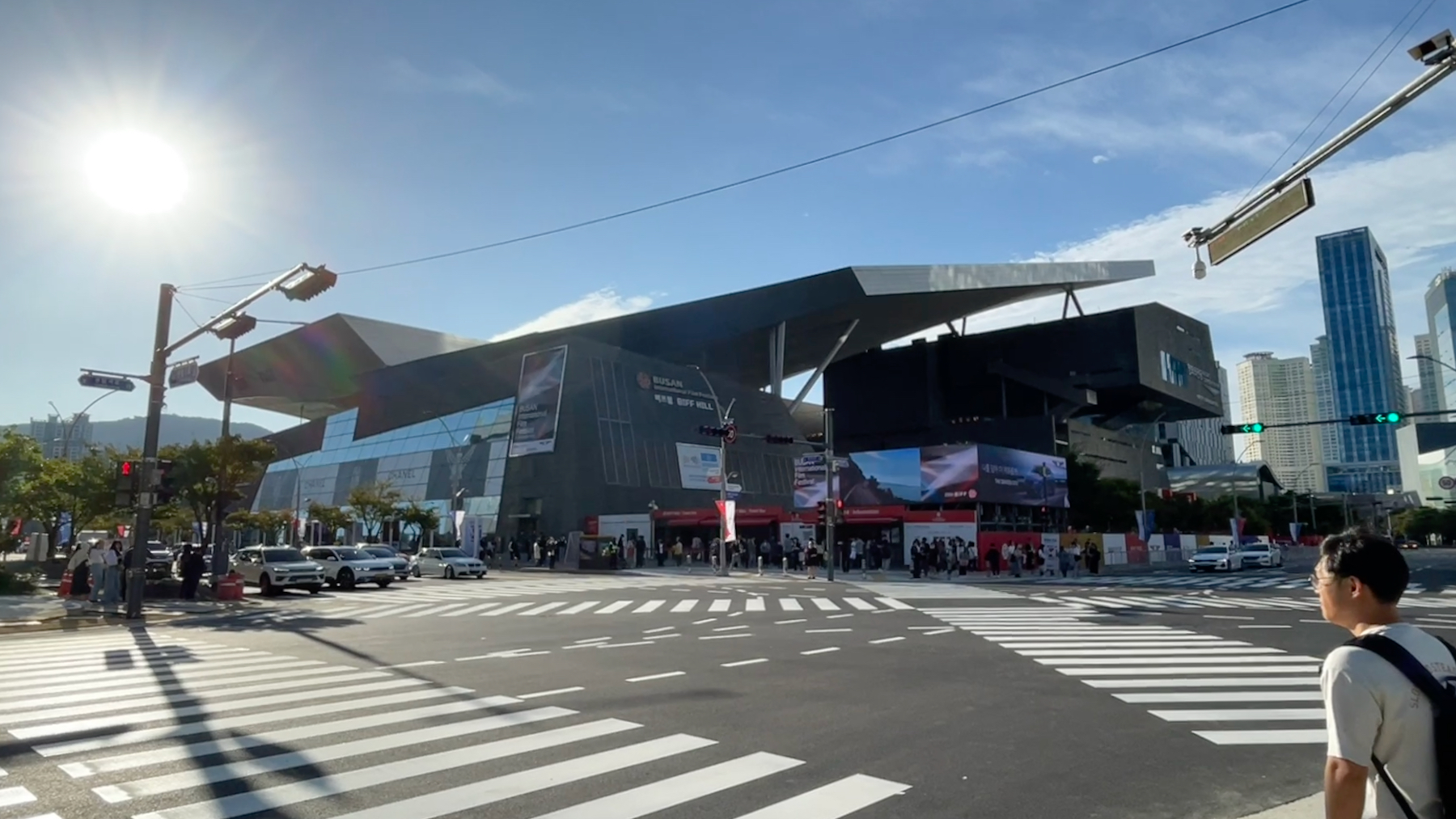
Busan Cinema Center, BIFF 2023

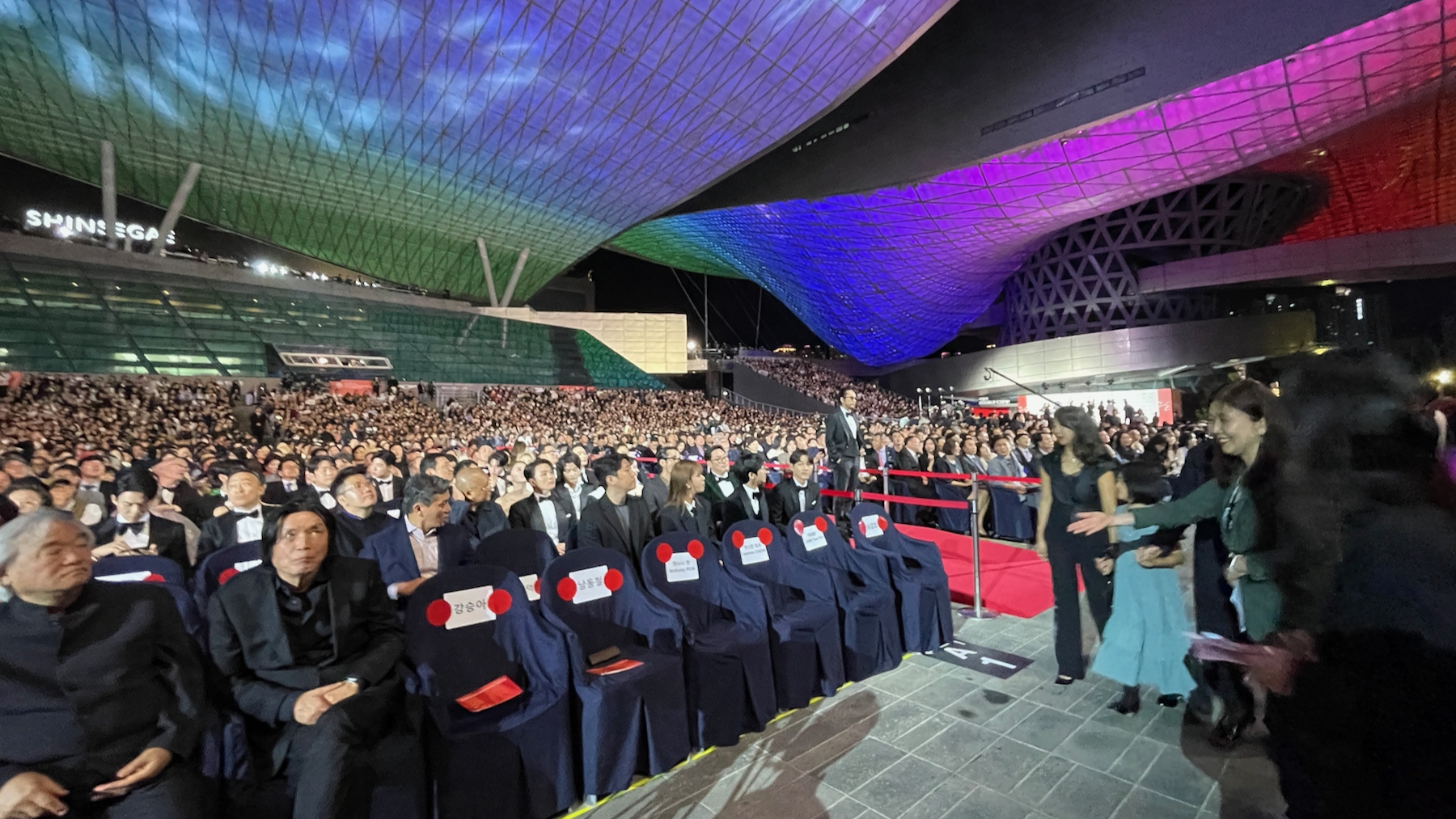
BIFF opening ceremony, 2023

- 25th Busan International Film Festival, 21–30 October 2020

Films Screened: 192 films from 68 countries
Opening Film: Septet: The Story of Hong Kong - Johnnie To, Ringo Lam, Hark Tsui, Sammo Hung, Ann Hui, Patrick Tam Yuen, Wo Ping, Hong Kong, China/China
Closing Film: Josee, the Tiger and the Fish - Tamura Kotaro, Japan
Total audience: 20,135

- 26th Busan International Film Festival, 6 to 15 October 2021

Films Screened: 223 films from 70 countries
Opening Film: Heaven: To the Land of Happiness by Im Sang-soo
Closing Film: Anita by Longman Leung
Total audience:76,072

- 27th Busan International Film Festival, 5 to 14 October 2022.

Films Screened: 242 films from 71 countries
Opening Film: Scent of Wind - Hadi Mohaghegh, Iran
Closing Film: A Man - Ishikawa Kei, Japan

- 28th Busan International Film Festival, 4 to 13 October 2023.

Films Screened: 269 films from 69 countries
Opening Film: Because I Hate Korea - Jang Kun-jae, South Korea
Closing Film: The Movie Emperor - Ning Hao, China

- 29th Busan International Film Festival, 2 to 11 October 2024.

Films Screened: 278 films from 63 countries
Opening Film: Uprising – Kim Sang-man, South Korea
Closing Film: Spirit World – Eric Khoo, France, Singapore, Japan

- 30th Busan International Film Festival, 17 to 26 September 2025. Starting with this edition, the festival introduced a new competition section to Asian cinema. This section showcased around 14 selected Asian films competing for five major honors: the Grand Prize, Best Director, Special Jury Prize, Best Actor/Actress, and Award for Artistic Contribution. Marking a significant departure from tradition, the film that wins the Grand Prize is presented as the festival's closing screening, replacing the previously chosen standalone title.

Films Screened: 241 films from 64 countries
Opening Film: No Other Choice – Park Chan-wook, South Korea
Closing Film: Gloaming in Luomu – Zhang Lü, China

- 31st Busan International Film Festival, 6 to 15 October 2026.

President of jury: Zhang Yimou, Chinese filmmaker
Films Screened: 315 films from 59 countries
Opening Film: The Table: Day and Night – Kim Jong-kwan, South Korea

== Official program sections ==
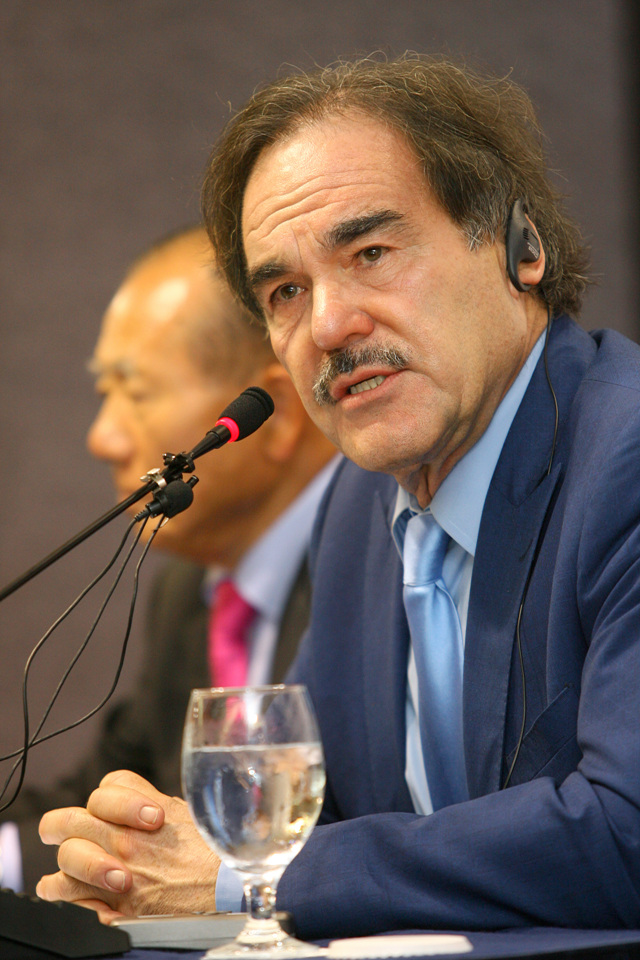
Gala Presentation Wall Street: Money Never Sleeps, 2010

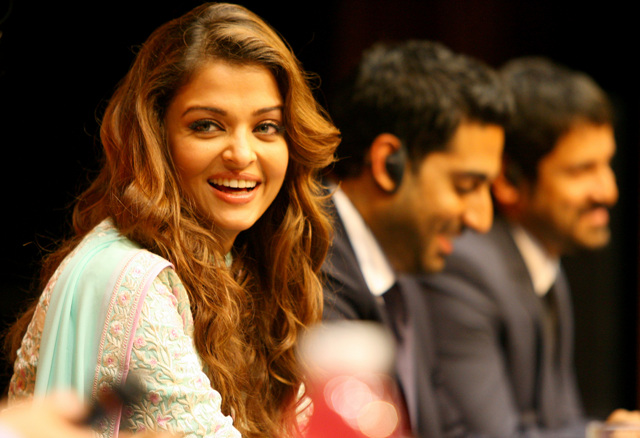
Gala Presentation Raavan & Raavanan, 2010

The Busan International Film Festival is organized in various sections

- Competition section for Asian cinema: From its 30th edition in 2025, the festival launched a competition section for the Asian cinema. Fourteen Asian films will compete in the festival's official competition, contending for five primary awards: the Grand Prize, Best Director, Special Jury Prize, Best Actor/Actress, and Artistic Contribution. The film awarded the Grand Prize will be presented as the festival's closing feature instead of separately selected film.
- Gala Presentation: Gala Presentation screens new master cineastes, films, and premieres.
- Icons: A showcase of the latest films of contemporary iconic filmmakers from around the world.
- Vision: This section showcases the latest independent films from Korea and Asia with outstanding artistry and original vision. Various awards are given out.
- A Window on Asian Cinema: A showcase of new and/or representative films by Asian filmmakers.
- Korean Cinema Today: Selected Korean feature films are shown in three sub-sections, Special Premiere, Panorama and Vision. These three sub-sections recognize the current production trend of Korean cinema and anticipate its future.
- Korean Cinema Retrospective: Revisiting the history of Korean cinema by spotlighting films of a certain notable director or films with a significant theme.
- World Cinema: Presentation of new works by filmmakers along with films that help understanding the recent trends in world cinema.
- Flash Forward: This section is a collection of first or second films of up-and-coming filmmakers from non-Asian countries.
- Wide Angle: A section showing short films, animation, documentaries, and experimental films.
- Open Cinema: outdoor screening venue where a collection of new films, combining both art and mass popularity, are shown.
- Midnight Passion: A collection of horror, SF, and thriller films that are certain to keep diehard film fans awake throughout the night.
- On Screen: Presentation of highly anticipated or most talked about drama series of the year.
- Special Programs in Focus /Special Planning Program: A retrospective and special showcase of films of a certain notable director or genre.
- Withdrawn sections
  - Jiseok: A competition section for established Asian filmmakers with three or more feature films. The two best films are presented with the Kim Jiseok Award. The award was created in commemoration of the late Kim Jiseok, program director who devoted his life to nurture and support Asian cinema.
  - New Currents: The only international competition section featuring the first or the second feature films by future directors of Asian cinema.

== Official divisions ==
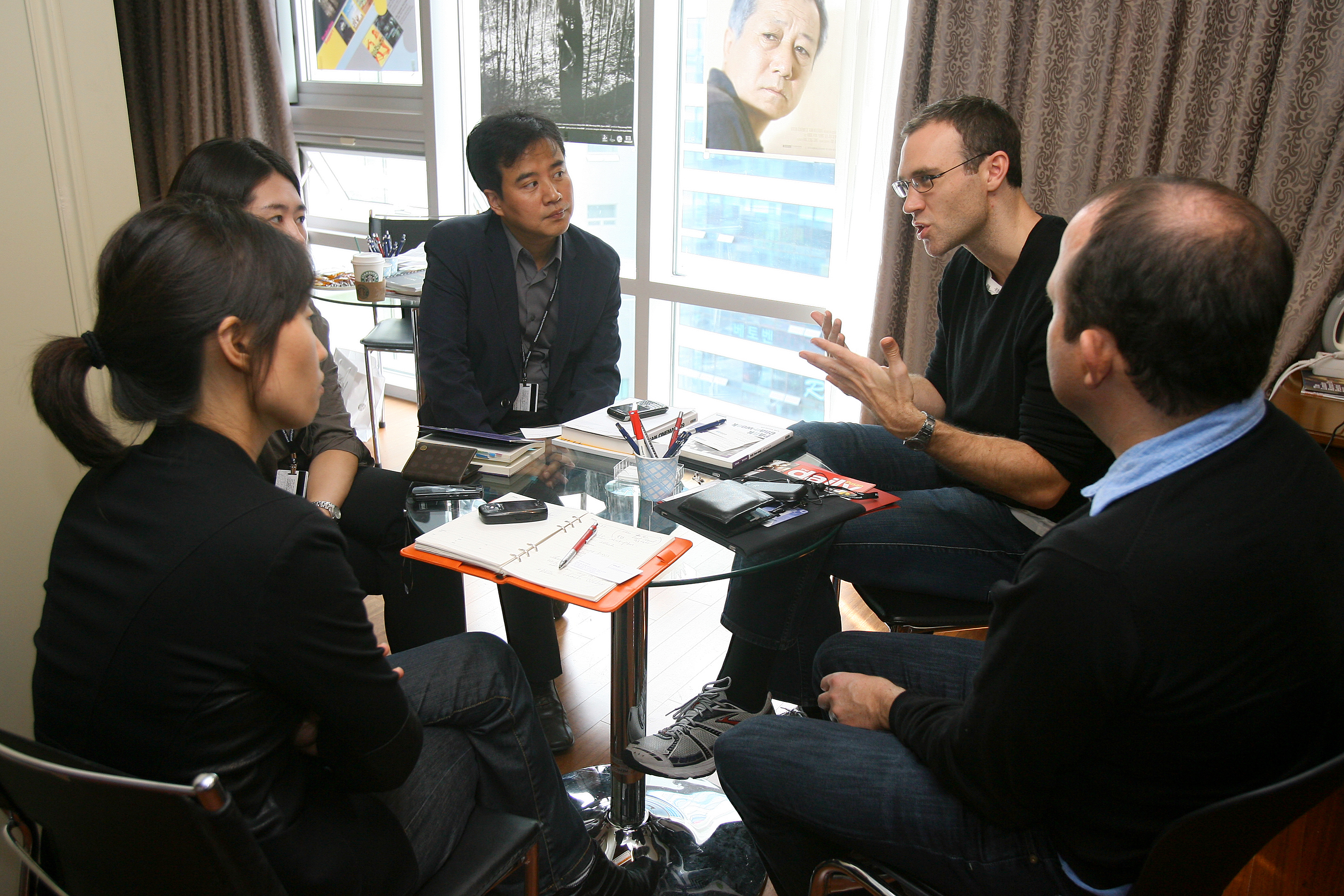
Asian Film Market

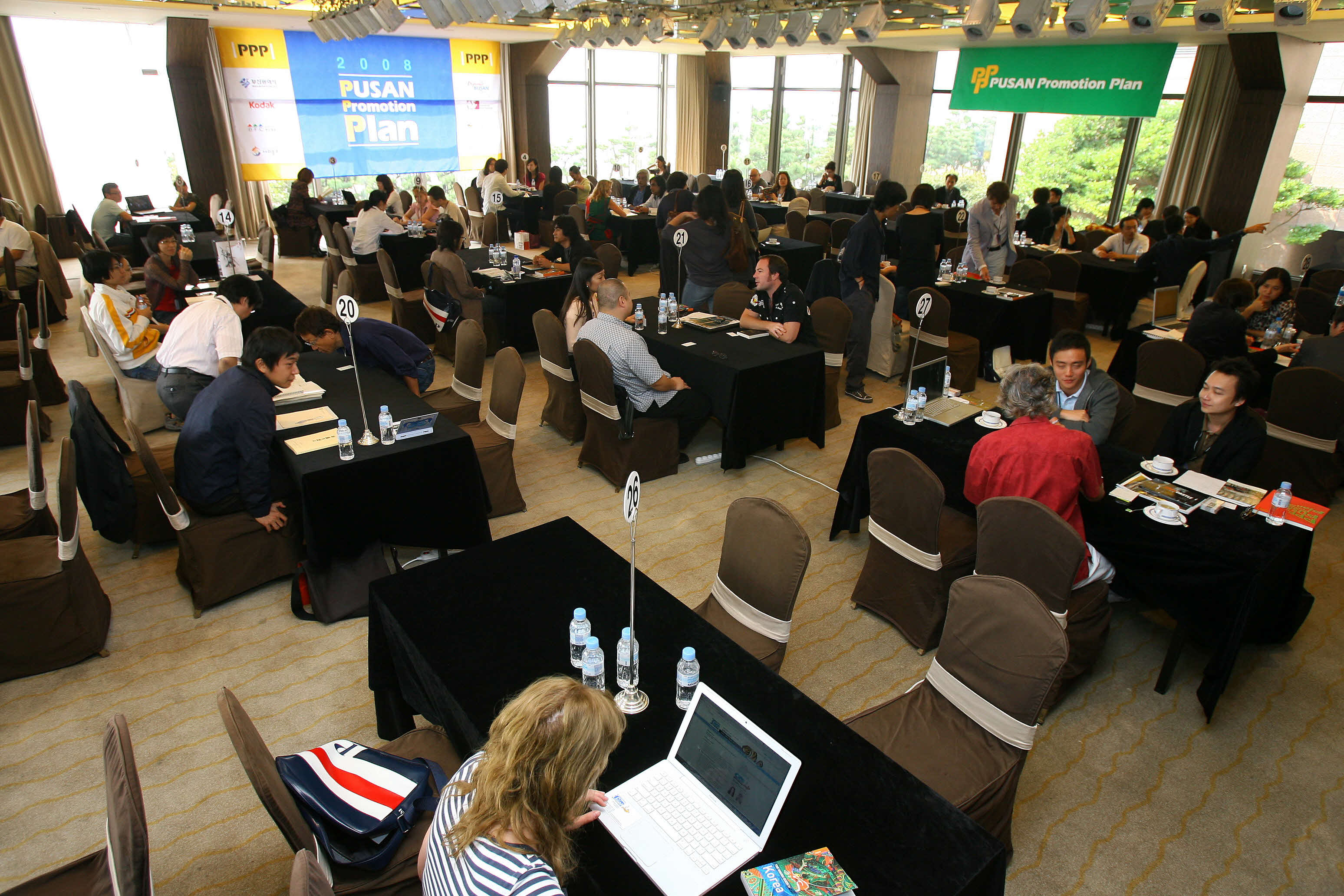
PPP(Pusan Promotion Plan) meeting

- Asian Contents & Film Market (ACFM): Launched in 2006 as a marketplace for the industry events at the Busan International Film Festival.
  - Asian Project Market (former PPP: Pusan Promotion Plan) is a pre-market.
- Asian Cinema Fund: The Asian Cinema Fund is a funding program to help activate more independent film productions and to set up a stable production environment. It supports projects in various stages and categories. The 900 million won (approximately US$900,000) Asian Cinema Fund will be used to provide support to seven projects in script development, five post-productions, and thirteen documentary films.
  - The Script Development Fund is aimed at helping screenwriters complete their scripts.
  - The Post-Production Fund is made possible through the support of Korean post-production companies and the Korean Film Council. With this fund, the director is invited to Korea to work on sound and DI with Korean post-production houses. It will help the director complete his or her film in 35mm.
  - The Asian Network of Documentary Fund was initiated in 2002 and sponsored by six universities and corporations in the Busan region. As a part of the Busan International Film Festival, and holds master classes and clinics to stabilise the environment for documentary productions.
- BIFF Asian Film Academy (BAFA) is an educational program where prospective filmmakers and established directors from Asia gather to deliberate and prepare for the future of Asian cinema.

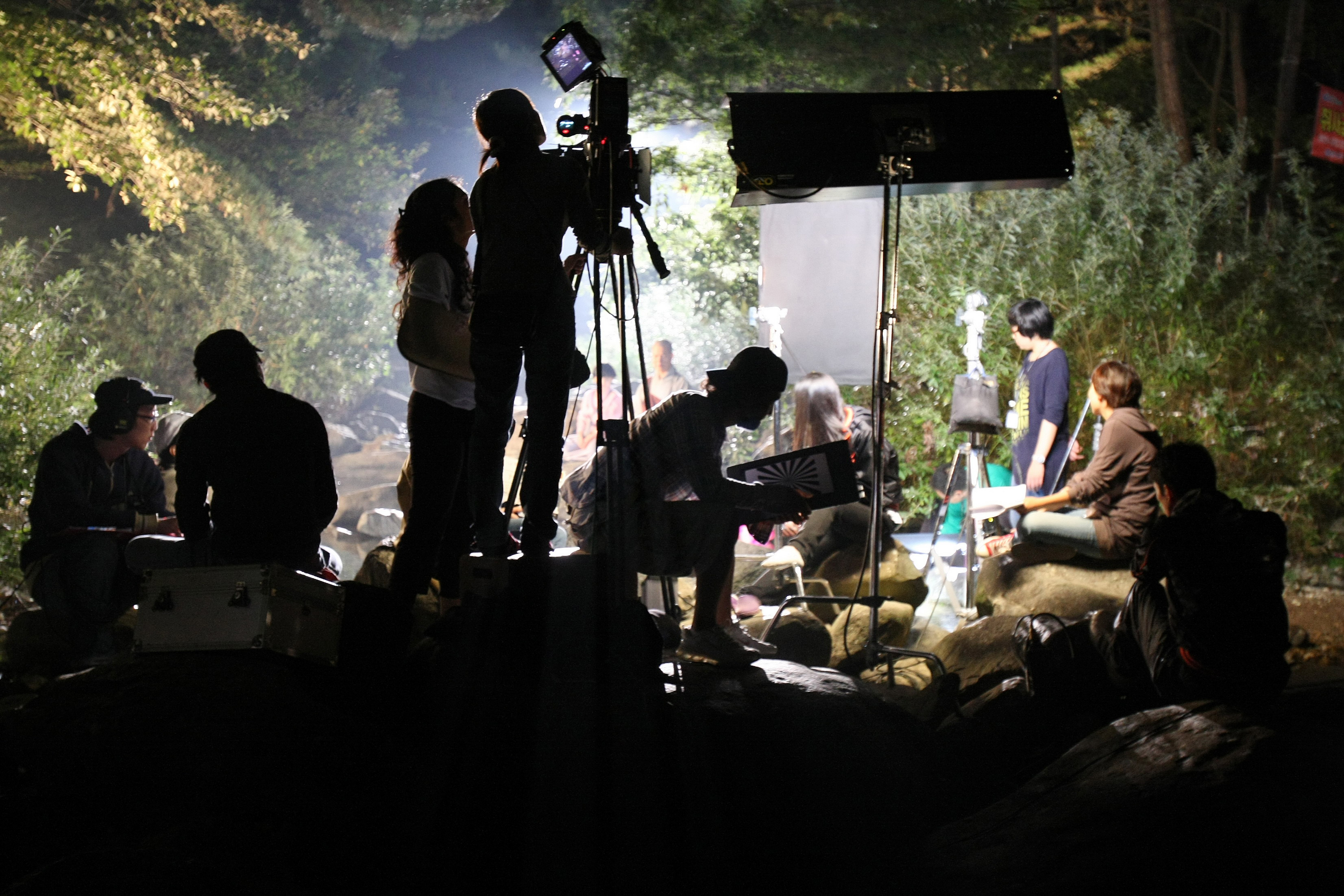
Asian Film Academy

- Busan Cinema Forum (BCF) is an academic event for filmmakers and scholars, launched on 10 October 2011. It aims to enhance the knowledge and support of the film industry and film aesthetics.
- Platform BUSAN
- BIFF Film Academy
- Community BIFF

== Direction and management ==
Chairpersons:

- 1996–1998: Moon Jung-soo
- 1998–2004: Ahn Sang-yeong
- 2004–2014: Hur Nam-sik
- 2014–2016: Suh Byung-soo
- 2016–2017: Kim Dong-ho
- 2018–2023: Lee Yong-gwan
- 2024-: Park Kwang-su

Festival Directors:

- 1996–2010: Kim Dong-ho
- 2007–2016: Lee Yong-gwan
- 2015–2017: Kang Soo-yeon
- 2018–2020: Jeon Yang-jun
- 2021–2023: Huh Moon-yung
- 2025–present: Jung Hanseok

Managing Directors:

- 2023: Cho Jong-kook

== Awards ==
A number of awards are handed out each year, including:

=== The Asian Filmmaker of the Year ===
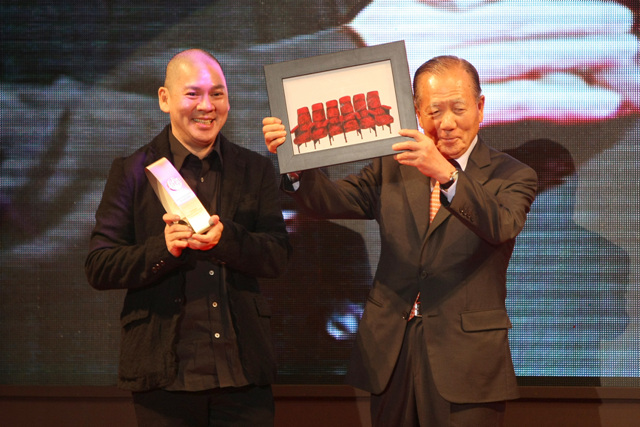
Tsai Ming-liang, Asian Filmmaker of the Year, Pusan International Film Festival 2010

The Asian Filmmaker of the Year (올해의 아시아영화인상) is granted to the Asian filmmaker who has made the most significant contribution to the advancement of Asian film industry and culture throughout the year.

No.	Year	Name	Country/Region
8	2003	Mohsen Makhmalbaf	Iran
9	2004	Hou Hsiao-hsien	Taiwan
10	2005	NHK	Japan
11	2006	Andy Lau	Hong Kong
12	2007	Edward Yang (1947–2007)	Taiwan
13	2008	Gulnara Sarsenova	Kazakhstan
14	2009	Yash Chopra	India
15	2010	Tsai Ming-liang	Taiwan
16	2011	Tsui Hark	Hong Kong
17	2012	Kōji Wakamatsu	Japan
18	2013	Rithy Panh	Cambodia
19	2014	Ann Hui	Hong Kong
20	2015	Studio Ghibli	Japan
21	2016	Abbas Kiarostami	Iran
22	2017	Seijun Suzuki	Japan
23	2018	Ryuichi Sakamoto	Japan
24	2019	Hirokazu Kore-eda	Japan
26	2021	Im Kwon-taek	South Korea
27	2022	Tony Leung	Hong Kong, China
28	2023	Chow Yun-fat	Hong Kong
29	2024	Kiyoshi Kurosawa	Japan
30	2025	Jafar Panahi	Iran
31	2026	Michelle Yeoh	Malaysian actress

=== Korean Cinema Award ===
The Korean Cinema Award (한국영화공로상) is presented to cineastes that have made a notable contribution in the globalization of Korean cinema.

No.	Year	Name	Country
1	1996	Adriano Aprà	Italy
1	1996	Tony Rayns	UK
1	1996	Alain Jalladeau	France
1	1996	Ulrich Gregor	Germany
1	1996	Larry Kadish	USA
1	1996	Ancha Flubacher-Rhim	Switzerland
1	1996	Simon Field	UK
2	1997	Aruna Vasudev	India
2	1997	Sato Tadao	Japan
3	1998	Gilles Jacob	France
3	1998	Moritz de Hadeln	Germany
4	1999	Serge Losique	Canada
4	1999	Lee Young-il	South Korea
5	2000	Martin & Anna Louisa Girod	Switzerland
6	2001	Eva Zaoralová	Czech Republic
7	2002	Alain Patel	France
8	2003	Park Byoung-yang	Japan
8	2003	Lee Bong-ou	Japan
9	2004	Yano Kazuyki	Japan
9	2004	Phillip Cheah	Singapore
10	2005	Dieter Kosslick	Germany
10	2005	Thierry Fremaux	France
11	2006	Martial Knaebell	Switzerland
11	2006	Terawaki Ken	Japan
12	2007	Sabrina Baracetti	Italy
12	2007	Jean-Francois Rauger	France
13	2008	Richard Pena	USA
14	2009	Riccardo Gelli	Italy
14	2009	Jeannette Paulson Hereniko	USA
15	2010	Bruno Barde	France
16	2011	Julietta Sichel	Czech Republic
17	2012	Hayashi Kanako	Japan
18	2013	Charles Tesson	France
19	2014	Corinne Siegrist-Oboussier	Switzerland
20	2015	Wieland Speck	German
21	2016	Laurence Herszberg	France
22	2017	Christoph Terhechte	Germany
23	2018	Martine Thérouanne	France
23	2018	Jean-Marc Thérouanne	France
24	2019	Bae Yongjae	South Korea
24	2019	Yoo Dongsuk	South Korea
26	2021	Lee Choon-yun	South Korea
27	2022	Goran Topalovic	US
28	2023	Yoon Jeong-hee	South Korea
29	2024	Lee Sun-kyun	South Korea
30	2025	Chung Ji-young	South Korea

=== The Choon-yun Award ===
The Choon-yun Award (이춘연 영화인상) was established in honor of the late Chairman of the Korean Association of Film Art & Industry, Lee Choon-yun. This award is given to one newly emerging producer with a cash prize of KRW 10,000,000, sponsored by IOK Company.

No.	Year	Name	Country
27	2022	Baek Jaeho	South Korea
28	2023	Kim Ji-yeon	South Korea
29	2024	Park Kwan-su	South Korea

=== New Currents Award ===
The New Currents Award (뉴 커런츠상) is given to the two best feature films selected from the first or second feature of new Asian directors introduced in the New Currents section. A grand prize of USD 30,000 is awarded to each film. The jury consists of world-renowned film experts who will choose winners to discover and encourage the hidden jewels of Asian cinema.

No.	Year	Film	Director	Country/Region
1	1996	Rain Clouds over Wushan	Zhang Ming	China
2	1997	Motel Cactus	Park Ki-yong	South Korea
3	1998	Xiao Wu	Jia Zhangke	China
4	1999	Timeless Melody	Hiroshi Okuhara	Japan
5	2000	The Day I Became a Woman	Marziyeh Meshkini	Iran
6	2001	Flower Island	Song Il-gon	South Korea
7	2002	Jealousy Is My Middle Name	Park Chan-ok	South Korea
7	2002	The Rite... A Passion	K.N.T. Sastry	India
8	2003	The Missing	Lee Kang-sheng	Taiwan
8	2003	Tiny Snowflakes	Alireza Amini	Iran
9	2004	This Charming Girl	Lee Yun-ki	South Korea
10	2005	Grain in Ear	Zhang Lu	China
11	2006	Betelnut	Heng Yang	China
11	2006	Love Conquers All	Tan Chui Mui	Malaysia
12	2007	Wonderful Town	Aditya Assarat	Thailand
12	2007	Life Track	Guang Hao Jin	China/Korea
12	2007	Flower in the Pocket	Liew Seng Tat	Malaysia
13	2008	Land of Scarecrows	Roh Gyeong-tae	South Korea
13	2008	Naked of Defenses	Masahide Ichii	Japan
14	2009	Kick Off	Shawkat Amin Korki	Iraq/Japan
14	2009	I'm in Trouble	So Sang-min	South Korea
15	2010	The Journals of Musan	Park Jung-bum	South Korea
15	2010	Bleak Night	Yoon Sung-hyun	South Korea
16	2011	Mourning	Morteza Farshbaf	Iran
16	2011	Nino	Loy Arcenas	Philippines
17	2012	36	Nawapol Thamrongrattanarit	Thailand
17	2012	Kayan	Maryam Najafi	Lebanon/Canada
18	2013	Pascha	Ahn Sun-kyoung	South Korea
18	2013	Remote Control	Byamba Sakhya	Mongolia/Germany
19	2014	End of Winter	Kim Dae-hwan	South Korea
20	2015	Immortal	Seyed Hadi Mohaghegh	Iran
20	2015	Walnut Tree	Yerlan Nurmukhambetov	Kazakhstan
21	2016	The Donor	Zang Qiwu	China
21	2016	Knife in the Clear Water	Wang Xuebo	China
22	2017	After My Death	Kim Ui-seok	Korea
22	2017	Blockage	Mohsen Gharaei	Iran
23	2018	Clean Up	Kwon Man-ki	South Korea
23	2018	Savage	Cui Siwei	China
24	2019	Haifa Street	Mohanad Hayal	Iraq/Qatar
24	2019	Rom	Tran Thanh Huy	Vietnam
25	2020	A Balance	Harumoto Yujiro	Japan
25	2020	Three	Ruslan Pak	Kazakhstan/ Korea/ Uzbekistan
26	2021	The Apartment with Two Women	Kim Se-in	South Korea
26	2021	Farewell, My Hometown	Wang Er Zhou	China
27	2022	a Wild Roomer	Lee Jeong-hong	South Korea
27	2022	Shivamma	Jaishankar Aryar	India
28	2023	Boli – The Wrestler	Iqbal Chowdhury	Bangladesh
28	2023	September 1923	Tatsuya Mori	Japan
29	2024	The Land of Morning Calm	Park Yi-woong	South Korea
29	2024	MA - Cry of Silence	The Maw Naing	Myanmar, South Korea, Singapore, France, Norway, Qatar

From 2025 'The New Currents' section was merged into the newly created Competition and Vision sections, the festival retained the New Currents Award, recognizing a debut feature by a first-time filmmaker chosen from entries in the Competition and Vision categories. A dedicated jury oversees the selection for this award.

No.	Year	Film	Director	Country/Region
30	2026	En Route To	Yoo Jae-in	South Korea

=== Kim Jiseok Award ===
The KIM Jiseok Award (지석상), Established in 2017, is to remember and honor the late Kim Jiseok who devoted his whole life to discovering and supporting the growth of Asian cinema. The award is given to the films in the competition category for the Korean and Asian directors who have directed more than 3 feature films, and two best films are selected and awarded a cash prize of USD 10,000 each sponsored by BIFF Supporters Association.

No.	Year	Film	Director	Country/Region
22	2017	Malila: The Farewell Flower	Anucha Boonyawatana	Thailand
22	2017	The Scythian Lamb	Daihachi Yoshida	Japan
23	2018	The Rib	Zhang Wei	China
23	2018	Rona, Azim's Mother	Jamshid Mahmoudi	Afghanistan/Iran
24	2019	Circus of Life	Sarmad Khoosat	Pakistan
24	2019	Market	Pradip Kurbah	India
25	2020	Drowning in Holy Water	Navid Mahmoudi	Afghanistan/Iran
25	2020	The Slaughterhouse	Abbas Amini	Iran
26	2021	The Rapist	Aparna Sen	India
26	2021	Gensan Punch	Brillante Mendoza	Philippines
27	2022	Scent of Wind	Seyed Hadi Mohaghegh	Iran
27	2022	Alteration	Yalkin Tuychiev	Uzbekistan
28	2023	Paradise	Prasanna Vithanage	Sri Lanka
28	2023	Bride Abduction	Mirlan Abdikhalikov	Kyrgyzstan
29	2024	Village Rockstars 2	Rima Das	India

=== BIFF Mecenat Award ===
BIFF Mecenat Award (비프메세나상) is granted to the best documentary from Korea and Asia in Wide Angle competitive section. The winner will be granted KRW 10,000,000 with the purpose of assisting their next production.

No.	Year	Film	Director	Country/Region
Woonpa Award
1	1996	Wind Echoing in My Being	Jeon Soo-il	South Korea
2	1997	The Six Day Fight in Myong Dong Cathedral	Kim Dong-won	South Korea
3	1998	Reclaiming Our Names	Hong Hyung-sook	South Korea
4	1999	My Own Breathing	Byun Young-joo	South Korea
4	1999	Mindullae	Choi Ha Dong-ha, Lee Jeong-soon	South Korea
5	2000	Sky-Blue Hometown	Kim So-young	South Korea
6	2001	Farewell	Hwang Yun	South Korea
7	2002	On the Right Track	Lee Ji-young	South Korea
7	2002	Mudang: Reconciliation Between the Living and the Dead	Park Ki-bok	South Korea
8	2003	And Thereafter	Lee Ho-sup	South Korea
9	2004	What Do People Live For?	Lee Jeong-soon	South Korea
10	2005	Coreen 2495	Ha Joon-so	South Korea
10	2005	Annyoung Sayonara	Kim Tae-il, Kumiko Katō	South Korea
11	2006	Our School	Kim Myeong-joon	South Korea
11	2006	People Crossing the River	Kim Duk-chul	South Korea
12	2007	Grandmother's Flower	Moon Jung-hyun	South Korea
Renamed as BIFF Mecenat Award
13	2008	Mental	Kazuhiro Soda	Japan
13	2008	Old Partner	Lee Chung-ryoul	South Korea
14	2009	Earth's Woman	Kwon Woo-jung	South Korea
14	2009	The Other Song	Saba Dewan	India
15	2010	Miracle on Jongno Street	Lee Hyuk-sang	South Korea
15	2010	New Castle	Guo Hengqi	China
16	2011	Sea of Butterfly	Park Bae-il	South Korea
16	2011	Shoji & Takao	Ide Yoko	Japan
17	2012	Anxiety	Min Hwan-ki	South Korea
17	2012	Embers	Tamara Stepanyan	Lebanon/Qatar/Armenia
18	2013	Jalanan ("Streetside")	Daniel Ziv	Indonesia
18	2013	Non-fiction Diary	Jung Yoon-suk	South Korea
19	2014	Collapse	Mun Jeong-hyun, Lee Won-woo	South Korea
19	2014	The Storm Makers	Guillaume Suon	Cambodia
20	2015	Boys Run	Kang Seok-pil	South Korea
20	2015	Look Love	Ye Yun	China
21	2016	The Crescent Rising	Sheron Dayoc	Philippines
21	2016	Neighborhood	Sung Seung-taek	South Korea
22	2017	Soseongri	Park Bae-il	South Korea
22	2017	Sennan Asbestos Disaster	Kazuo Hara	Japan
23	2018	Army	Kelvin Park Kyung-kun	South Korea
23	2018	Opening Closing Forgetting	James T. Hong	Taiwan
24	2019	Noodle Kid	Huo Ning	China
24	2019	Underground	Kim Jeong-keun	South Korea
25	2020	The Art of Living in Danger	Mina Keshavarz	Iran/Germany
25	2020	Sister J	Lee Soojung	South Korea
26	2021	Self-Portrait: Fairy Tale in 47 km	Zhang Meng-Chi	China
26	2021	206: Unearthed	Heo Cheol-nyeong	South Korea
27	2022	A Table for Two	Kim Boram	South Korea
27	2022	The Football Aficionado	Sharmin Mojtahedzadeh, Paliz Khoshdel	Iran
28	2023	The Voices of the Silenced	Park Ma-ui, Park Soo-nam	South Korea/Japan
28	2023	Republic	Jin Jiang	Singapore/China

=== Sonje Award ===
Sonje Award (선재상) is given to the best Korean and Asian short films in the Wide Angle section, to assist them in producing next project by providing KRW 10,000,000 to each director.

No.	Year	Film	Director	Country/Region
1	1996	Arrival of the Train	Andrej Sheleznjakov	Russia
2	1997	The Saltmen of Tibet	Ulrike Koch	Switzerland
3	1998	Lachrymal	Lim Chang-jae	South Korea
3	1998	Heavy	Park Chan-ok	South Korea
4	1999	28 October 1979, A Sunny Sunday	Kwon Jong-kwan	South Korea
5	2000	Bardo	Yoon Young-ho	South Korea
6	2001	Siam Hard Romance	Kim Jeong-gu	South Korea
7	2002	Chapter Two: How to Breathe	Lee Hyung-suk	South Korea
8	2003	The Spring and the Delight	Park Jung-seon	South Korea
8	2003	The Third Tongue	Son Kwang-ju	South Korea
9	2004	Punk Eek	Son Kwang-ju	South Korea
9	2004	Gold Fish	Park Shin-woo	South Korea
10	2005	Tea & Poison	Joung Yong-ju	South Korea
10	2005	A Bowl of Tea	Kim Young-nam	South Korea
11	2006	Portfolio	Yoon Seong-ho	South Korea
11	2006	The Wind Stirs	Lee Jin-woo	South Korea
12	2007	Woong's Story	Lee Ha-song	South Korea
12	2007	A Man Under the Influenza	Jung July	South Korea
13	2008	Andong	Rommel Tolentino	Philippines
13	2008	Girl	Hong Sung-hoon	South Korea
14	2009	Somewhere Unreached	Kim Jae-won	South Korea
14	2009	Rare Fish	Basil Mironer	Singapore/Indonesia
15	2010	Broken Night	Yang Hyo-joo	South Korea
15	2010	Inhalation	Edmund Yeo	Malaysia/Japan
16	2011	See You Tomorrow	Lee Woo-jung	South Korea
16	2011	Thug Beram	Venkat Amudhan	India
17	2012	The Night of The Witness	Park Buem	South Korea
17	2012	A Little Farther	Nikan Nezami	Iran
18	2013	A Lady Caddy Who Never Saw a Hole in One	Yosep Anggi Noen	Indonesia
18	2013	In the Summer	Son Tae-gyum	South Korea
19	2014	Stairway	Matt Wu	Taiwan
19	2014	The Night	Choi Ki-yun	South Korea
20	2015	Nia's Door	Lau Kek Huat	Taiwan
20	2015	Shame Diary	Lee Eun-jeong	South Korea
21	2016	Off-season	Yelzat Eskendir	Kazakhstan
21	2016	Viewer	Kim So-youn	South Korea
22	2017	A Hand-written Poster	Kwak Eun-mi	South Korea
22	2017	Madonna	Sinung Winahyoko	Indonesia
23	2018	Cat Day Afternoon	Kwon Sung-mo	South Korea
23	2018	Nooreh	Ashish Pandey	India
24	2019	Dragon's Tail	Saeed Keshavarz	Iran
24	2019	Hello	Jin Seong-moon	South Korea
25	2020	Georgia	Jayil Pak	South Korea
25	2020	Mountain Cat	Lkhagvadulam Purev-Ochir	Mongolia/United Kingdom
26	2021	A Winter Glove	Lee Hyeonju	South Korea
26	2021	The Sea Calls for Me	Tumpal Tampubolon	Indonesia
27	2022	Southern Afternoon	Lan Tian	China
27	2022	I'm Here	Jeong Eunuk	South Korea
28	2023	MYDEAR	Jeon Do-hee, Kim So-hee	South Korea
28	2023	21 weeks later	Nasreen Mohammadpur	Iran

=== Actor & Actress of the Year ===
The Actor of the Year (올해의 배우상) is the award to focus on the newcomer in the independent Korean films among the New Currents and Korean Cinema Today – Vision section. The renowned Korean actor and actress select one actor and one actress with outstanding performance. The winners will be awarded at the closing ceremony with a cash prize of KRW 5,000,000 each.

No.	Year	Actor	Film	Country	Actress	Film	Country
19	2014	Choi Woo-shik	Set Me Free	South Korea	Cho Soo-hyang	Wild Flowers	South Korea
20	2015	Lee Ju-won	ALONE	South Korea	Sun Jang	Communication & Lies	South Korea
21	2016	Koo Kyo-hwan	Jane	South Korea	Lee Min-ji	Jane	South Korea
22	2017	Park Jong-hwan	Hit the Night	South Korea	Jeon Yeo-been	After My Death	South Korea
23	2018	—N/a	—N/a	—N/a	Choi Hee-seo; Lee Joo-young	Our Body; Maggie	South Korea
24	2019	Kim Jun-hyung	The Education	South Korea	Mun Hye-in	The Education	South Korea
25	2020	Ji Soo	Our Joyful Summer Days	South Korea	Lim Seong-mi	FIGHTER	South Korea
26	2021	Kwon Daham	Through My Midwinter	South Korea	Lim Ji-ho	The Apartment with Two Women	South Korea
27	2022	Kim Youngsung	Big Sleep	South Korea	Kim Geumsoon	Star of Ulsan	South Korea
28	2023	Jang Sung-bum	Work to Do	South Korea	Oh Min-ae	Concerning My Daughter	South Korea

=== KB New Currents Audience Award ===
KB New Currents Audience Award(KB 뉴 커런츠 관객상; formerly KNN Award) is given to the film that is most highly rated by festival audiences from the New Currents section. Sponsored by KB Kookmin Bank, KRW 20,000,000 is awarded to the director.

No.	Year	Film	Director	Country/Region
PSB Award
3	1998	April Story	Iwai Shunji	Japan
4	1999	Gemini	Shinya Tsukamoto	Japan
5	2000	Die Bad	Ryoo Seung-wan	South Korea
6	2001	Flower Island	Song Il-gon	South Korea
7	2002	Too Young to Die	Park Jin-pyo	South Korea
8	2003	The Road Taken	Hong Ki-sun	South Korea
8	2003	Osama	Siddiq Barmak	Afghanistan
9	2004	Survive Style 5+	Gen Sekiguchi	Japan
10	2005	The Unforgiven	Yoon Jong-bin	South Korea
Renamed as KNN Award
11	2006	The White Silk Dress	Luu Huynh	Vietnam
12	2007	Flower in the Pocket	Liew Seng Tat	Malaysia
13	2008	100	Chris Martinez	Philippines
14	2009	Lan	Jiang Wenli	China
15	2010	My Spectacular Theatre	Lu Yang	China
16	2011	Watch Indian Circus	Mangesh Hadawale	India
17	2012	Touch of the Light	Chang Jung-Chi	Taiwan
18	2013	10 Minutes	Lee Yong-seung	South Korea
19	2014	Ghadi	Amin Dora	Lebanon
20	2015	Radio Set	Hari Viswanath	India
21	2016	In Between Seasons	Lee Dong-eun	South Korea
22	2017	End of Summer	Zhou Quan	China
23	2018	House of Hummingbird	Kim Bora	South Korea
24	2019	An Old Lady	Lim Sun-ae	South Korea
Renamed as KB New Currents Audience Award
26	2021	The Apartment with Two Women	Kim Se-in	South Korea
27	2022	The Winter Within	Aamir Bashir	India/France/Qatar
28	2023	Heritage	Lee Jong-su	South Korea

=== Flash Forward Audience Award ===
Flash Forward Audience Award (플래시 포워드 관객상) is given to the film that is most highly rated by festival audiences from the Flash Forward section. Sponsored by BIFF Supporters Association, KRW 10,000,000 is awarded to the director.

No.	Year	Film	Director	Country
Flash Forward Award
14	2009	Last Cowboy Standing	Zaida Bergroth	Finland/Germany
15	2010	Pure	Lisa Langseth	Sweden
16	2011	Là-bas: A Criminal Education	Guido Lombardi	Italy
17	2012	Flower Buds	Zdeněk Jirasky	Czech Republic
Renamed as Busan Bank Award
18	2013	Home	Maximilian Hult	Sweden/Iceland
19	2014	The Boss, Anatomy of a Crime	Sebastián Schindel	Argentina
20	2015	Highway to Hellas	Aron Lehmann	Germany
21	2016	Night of a 1000 Hours	Virgil Widrich	Luxembourg/Austria/Netherlands
22	2017	Pulse	Stevie Cruz-Martin	Australia
23	2018	The Little Comrade	Moonika Siimets	Estonia
24	2019	Fabulous	Mélanie Charbonneau	Canada
Renamed as Flash Forward Award
25	2020	Tigers	Ronnie Sandahl	Sweden/Italy/ Denmark
Renamed as Flash Forward Audience Award
26	2021	Mass	Fran Kranz	USA
27	2022	Riceboy Sleeps	Anthony Shim	Canada
28	2023	The Dreamer	Anais Tellenne	France

=== FIPRESCI Award ===
FIPRESCI (International Federation of Film Critics) Award (국제영화비평가연맹상) is given to well-made works that reflect its experimental and progressive spirit, among those presented in the New Currents section.

No.	Year	Film	Director	Country/Region
2	1997	Made in Hong Kong	Fruit Chan	Hong Kong, China
3	1998	Ikinai	Hiroshi Shimizu	Japan
4	1999	The Cup	Khyentse Norbu	Bhutan
5	2000	Sunflower	Isao Yukisada	Japan
6	2001	Flower Island	Song Il-gon	South Korea
6	2001	One Fine Spring Day	Hur Jin-ho	South Korea
7	2002	Too Young to Die	Park Jin-pyo	South Korea
8	2003	Deep Breath	Parviz Shahbazi	Iran
9	2004	Soap Opera	Wuershan	China
10	2005	The Unforgiven	Yoon Jong-bin	South Korea
11	2006	Love Conquers All	Tan Chui Mui	Malaysia
12	2007	The Red Awn	Cai Shangjun	China
13	2008	Jalainur	Ye Zhao	China
14	2009	Kick Off	Shawkat Amin Korki	Iraq/Japan
15	2010	The Journals of Musan	Park Jung-bum	South Korea
16	2011	Mourning	Morteza Farshbaf	Iran
17	2012	36	Nawapol Thamrongrattanarit	Thailand
18	2013	10 Minutes	Lee Yong-seung	South Korea
19	2014	What's the Time in Your World?	Safi Yazdanian	Iran
20	2015	Immortal	Hadi Mohaghegh	Iran
21	2016	White Ant	Chu Hsien-che	Taiwan
22	2017	Last Child	Shin Dong-seok	South Korea
23	2018	The Red Phallus	Tashi Gyeltshen	Bhutan/Germany/Nepal
24	2019	Running to the Sky	Mirlan Abdykalykov	Kyrgyzstan
25	2020	Summer Blur	Han Shuai	China
26	2021	Seire	Park Kang	South Korea
27	2022	Thousand and One Nights	Nao Kubota	Japan
28	2023	That Summer Lie	Son Hyeon-rok	South Korea

=== NETPAC Award ===
The NETPAC Award (아시아영화진흥기구상) is given to the best film selected by the NETPAC(The Network for the Promotion of Asian Cinema) jury among the films screened in the New Currents section.

No.	Year	Film	Director	Country
1	1996	Three Friends	Yim Soon-rye	South Korea
2	1997	Timeless, Bottomless Bad Movie	Jang Sun-woo	South Korea
3	1998	The Power of Kangwon Province	Hong Sang-soo	South Korea
4	1999	The Bird Who Stops in the Air	Jeon Soo-il	South Korea
5	2000	Chunhyang	Im Kwon-taek	South Korea
6	2001	Take Care of My Cat	Jeong Jae-eun	South Korea
7	2002	Road Movie	Kim In-sik	South Korea
8	2003	Untold Scandal	E J-yong	South Korea
9	2004	3-Iron	Kim Ki-duk	South Korea
10	2005	The Unforgiven	Yoon Jong-bin	South Korea
11	2006	The Last Dining Table	Roh Gyeong-tae	South Korea
12	2007	Hello Stranger	Kim Dong-hyun	South Korea
12	2007	With a Girl of Black Soil	Jeon Soo-il	South Korea
13	2008	Members of the Funeral	Baek Seung-bin	South Korea
13	2008	Treeless Mountain	Kim So-yong	South Korea
14	2009	Paju	Park Chan-ok	South Korea
15	2010	Dooman River	Zhang Lu	China
16	2011	The King of Pigs	Yeon Sang-ho	South Korea
17	2012	Jiseul	O Muel	South Korea
18	2013	Shuttlecock	Lee Yu-bin	South Korea
19	2014	Socialphobia	Hong Seok-jae	South Korea
20	2015	Communication & Lies	Lee Seung-won	South Korea
21	2016	Merry Christmas Mr. Mo	Lim Dae-hyung	South Korea
22	2017	February	Kim Joong-hyun	South Korea
23	2018	House of Hummingbird	Kim Bo-ra	South Korea
24	2019	Moving On	Yoon Dan-bi	South Korea
25	2020	FIGHTER	Jéro Yun	South Korea
26	2021	The Apartment with Two Women	Kim Se-in	South Korea
27	2022	a Wild Roomer	Lee Jeong-hong	South Korea
28	2023	Solid by the Sea	Patiparn Buntharik	Thailand

=== LG OLED New Currents Award ===
The LG OLED New Currents Award(LG 올레드 뉴 커런츠상) is established in 2023, is given to an Asian feature film in the New Currents section, that demonstrates an innovation in visual aesthetics. The award recipient will be chosen by the New Currents jurors, and will be granted prizes sponsored by LG OLED including ₩30,000,000 cash award.

No.	Year	Film	Director	Country
28	2023	Solid by the Sea	Patiparn Buntharik	Thailand

=== LG OLED Vision Award ===
The LG OLED Vision Award(LG 올레드 비전상; formerly Daemyung Culture Wave Award, KTH Award, Watcha Award) is given to one Korean film in the Korean Cinema Today - Vision and New Currents section, that demonstrates an innovation in visual aesthetics. The award recipient will be granted prizes sponsored by LG OLED including ₩30,000,000 cash award.

No.	Year	Film	Director	Country
Daemyung Culture Wave Award
19	2014	The Liar	Kim Dong-myung	South Korea
20	2015	Overman	Seo Eun-young	South Korea
21	2016	Yongsoon	Shin Joon	South Korea
Renamed as KTH Award
23	2018	Clean up	Kwon Man-ki	South Korea
23	2018	A Boy and Sungreen	Ahn Ju-young	South Korea
24	2019	Lucky Monster	Bong Joon-young	South Korea
24	2019	Moving On	Yoon Dan-bi	South Korea
25	2020	Snowball	Lee Woo-jung	South Korea
25	2020	Young Adult Matters	Lee Hwan	South Korea
Renamed as Watcha Award
26	2021	Through My Midwinter	Oh Seong-ho	South Korea
26	2021	The Apartment with Two Women	Kim Se-in	South Korea
27	2022	Peafowl	Byun Sung-bin	South Korea
27	2022	Greenhouse	Lee Sol-hui	South Korea
Renamed as LG OLED Vision Award
28	2023	The Berefts	Jung Beom, Heo Jang	South Korea

=== DGK PLUS M Award ===
The DGK PLUS M Award(한국영화감독조합 플러스엠상; formerly DGK Award) goes to two Korean films from the Korean Cinema Today - Vision section. Each winner will be granted KRW 5,000,000. This cash prize is sponsored by Directors Guild of Korea and PLUS M.

No.	Year	Recipient	Category	Film	Country
DGK Award
16	2011	Yeon Sang-ho	Director	The King of Pigs	South Korea
16	2011	Ha Hyun-kwan	Actor	Beautiful Miss Jin	South Korea
16	2011	Han Song-hee, Hwang Jung-min	Actress	Jesus Hospital	South Korea
17	2012	O Muel	Director	Jiseul	South Korea
17	2012	Shin Yeon-shick	Director	The Russian Novel	South Korea
17	2012	Shim Hee-sub, Ahn Jae-hong, Kim Chang-hwan	Actor	Sunshine Boys	South Korea
17	2012	Jang Young-nam	Actress	Azooma	South Korea

No.	Year	Film	Director	Country
DGK Award
19	2014	A Midsummer's Fantasia	Jang Kun-jae	South Korea
19	2014	Socialphobia	Hong Seok-jae	South Korea
20	2015	The Boys Who Cried Wolf of	Kim Jin-hwang	South Korea
20	2015	Eyelids	O Muel	South Korea

No.	Year	Director	Film	Country
Vision-Director's Award
21	2016	Jang Woo-jin	Autumn, Autumn	South Korea
21	2016	Ahn Seon-kyoung	Hyeon's Quartet	South Korea
22	2017	Kim Joong-hyun	February	South Korea
22	2017	Jeong Ga-young	Hit the Night	South Korea

No.	Year	Film	Director	Country
DGK Award
23	2018	Bori	Kim Jin-yu	South Korea
23	2018	Sub-zero Wind	Kim Yu-ri	South Korea
24	2019	Moving On	Yoon Dan-bi	South Korea
24	2019	Lucky Chan-sil	Kim Cho-hee	South Korea
Renamed as DGK Megabox Award
25	2020	Young Adult Matters	Lee Hwan	South Korea
25	2020	Good Person	Jung Wook	South Korea
26	2021	Through My Midwinter	Oh Seong-ho	South Korea
26	2021	A Lonely Island in the Distant Sea	Kim Miyoung	South Korea
27	2022	Big Sleep	Kim Taehoon	South Korea
27	2022	Star of Ulsan	Jung Kihyuk	South Korea
28	2023	Work to Do	Park Hong-joon	South Korea
28	2023	Isle of Snakes	Kim Yoo-min	South Korea

=== CGV Award ===
CGV Award(CGV상) was newly created in 2011 in collaboration with CJ CGV to shed new light on the Korean Cinema Today - Vision section. The winner will receive a cash prize of KRW 10,000,000 sponsored by CJ CGV.

No.	Year	Film	Director	Country
Movie Collage Award
16	2011	The King of Pigs	Yeon Sang-ho	South Korea
Renamed as CGV Movie Collage Award
17	2012	Jiseul	O Muel	South Korea
18	2013	Han Gong-ju	Lee Su-jin	South Korea
19	2014	A Matter of Interpretation	Lee Kwang-kuk	South Korea
Renamed as CGV Arthouse Award
20	2015	Eyelids	O Muel	South Korea
21	2016	Jane	Cho Hyun-hoon	South Korea
22	2017	Microhabitat	Jeon Go-woon	South Korea
23	2018	Maggie	Yi Ok-seop	South Korea
24	2019	Lucky Chan-sil	Kim Cho-hee	South Korea
25	2020	Good Person	Jung Wook	South Korea
26	2021	Chorokbam	Yoon Seo-jin	South Korea
Renamed as CGV Award
27	2022	Greenhouse	Lee Sol-hui	South Korea
28	2023	Concerning My Daughter	Lee Mi-rang	South Korea

=== KBS Independent Film Award ===
The KBS Independent Film Award(KBS독립영화상) is given to support Korean independent films. One Korean film will be selected among Korean Cinema Today - Vision and New Currents section to receive KRW 10,000,000. This cash prize is sponsored by Korean Broadcasting System.

No.	Year	Film	Director	Country
23	2018	Maggie	Yi Ok-seop	South Korea
24	2019	Lucky Chan-sil	Kim Cho-hee	South Korea
25	2020	LIMECRIME	Lee Seunghwan, Yoo Jaewook	South Korea
26	2021	Hot in Day, Cold at Night	Park Song-yeol	South Korea
27	2022	a Wild Roomer	Lee Jeong-hong	South Korea
28	2023	House of the Seasons	Oh Jung-min	South Korea

=== CGK Award ===
The CGK Award(CGK촬영상), sponsored by Cinematographers Guild of Korea, is given to one Korean film from either New Currents or Korean Cinema Today - Vision section. The winner's cinematographer will be granted KRW 5,000,000.

No.	Year	Film	Cinematographer	Country
CGK&SamyangXEEN Award
24	2019	Kyungmi's World	Kim Gilja	South Korea
25	2020	Snowball	Lee Jae-u	South Korea
Renamed as CGK Award
26	2021	Chorokbam	Choo Kyeong-yeob	South Korea
27	2022	Hail to Hell	Jung Grim	South Korea
28	2023	House of the Seasons	Lee Jinkeun	South Korea

=== Critic b Award ===
Critic b Award(크리틱b상) is given to one film chosen by Busan Film Critics Association among the selections in the New Currents and the Korean Cinema Today - Vision section. The winner will receive KRW 10,000,000.

No.	Year	Film	Director	Country
26	2021	Hot in Day, Cold at Night	Park Song-yeol	South Korea
27	2022	a Wild Roomer	Lee Jeong-hong	South Korea
28	2023	Last Summer	Choi Seung-woo	South Korea

=== Watcha Short Award ===
Watcha Short Award (왓챠단편상) is established to support short film directors in Korean cinema. Two short films chosen from Wide Angle - Korean Short Competition section will be given a cash prize of KRW 5,000,000. This cash prize is sponsored by Watcha.

No.	Year	Film	Director	Country
27	2022	Other Life	Roh Dohyeon	South Korea
28	2023	MYDEAR	Jeon Do-hee, Kim So-hee	South Korea
28	2023	KARMA	Choi Soo-hyuk	South Korea

=== Aurora Media Award ===
Aurora Media Award (오로라미디어상) is established to support new directors in Korean cinema. Two Korean films chosen from the New Currents and the Korean Cinema Today - Vision section will be given a cash prize of KRW 10,000,000 respectively. This cash prize is sponsored by Aurora Media.

No.	Year	Film	Director	Country
27	2022	Greenhouse	Lee Sol-hui	South Korea
27	2022	Big Sleep	Kim Taehoon	South Korea
28	2023	House of the Seasons	Oh Jung-min	South Korea
28	2023	FAQ	Kim Da-min	South Korea

=== Citizen Critics' Award ===
Citizen critics from the Busan Cinematheque choose the best film from those screened in Korean Cinema Today - Vision section. Citizen Critics' Award (시민평론가상) is awarded KRW 10,000,000 for supporting the director's next production.

No.	Year	Film	Director	Country
16	2011	Romance Joe	Lee Kwang-kuk	South Korea
17	2012	Jiseul	O Muel	South Korea
18	2013	Han Gong-ju	Lee Su-jin	South Korea
18	2013	Shuttlecock	Lee Yu-bin	South Korea
19	2014	Set Me Free	Kim Tae-yong	South Korea
20	2015	ALONE	Park Hong-min	South Korea
21	2016	Jamsil	Lee Wan-min	South Korea
22	2017	Possible Faces	Lee Kang-hyun	South Korea
23	2018	Maggie	Yi Ok-seop	South Korea
24	2019	Moving On	Yoon Dan-bi	South Korea
26	2021	Chorokbam	Yoon Seo-jin	South Korea
27	2022	Birth	Yoo Ji-young	South Korea
28	2023	The Berefts	Jung Beom, Heo Jang	South Korea

=== Busan Cinephile Award ===
Busan Cinephile Award (부산시네필상) is given to the best Korean and Asian documentary film presented in the Wide Angle documentary showcase section. The winner is awarded KRW 5,000,000. The jury of college students, including numerous students from the cinema-related departments of six universities in Busan region, select the winner.

No.	Year	Film	Director	Country
16	2011	The Twin	Gustav Danielsson	Sweden
17	2012	5 Broken Cameras	Emad Burnat, Guy Davidi	Palestine/Israel/ France/Netherlands
18	2013	Father's Garden – The Love of My Parents	Peter Liechti	Switzerland
19	2014	The Look of Silence	Joshua Oppenheimer	Denmark
20	2015	The Other Side	Roberto Minervini	Italy/France
21	2016	The Apology	Tiffany Hsiung	Canada
22	2017	A Free Man	Andreas Hartmann	Germany/Japan
23	2018	Bruce Lee and the Outlaw	Joost Vandebrug	United Kingdom/Netherlands/ Czech Republic
24	2019	Que Sea Ley (Let It Be Law)	Juan Diego Solanas	France/Argentina/Uruguay
26	2021	I′m So Sorry	Zhao Liang	Hong Kong/France/Netherlands
27	2022	While We Watched	Vinay Shukla	United Kingdom
28	2023	Yellow Door: ′90s Lo-fi Film Club	Lee Hyuk-rae	South Korea

=== Camellia Award ===
In 2024, the "Camellia Award" was introduced, named after Busan's city flower, the camellia. This award, established with the involvement of Chanel, aims to elevate the status of women in the film industry. The first recipient of this honor was Ryu Seong-hie, a South Korean film art director.

No.	Year	Recipient	Vocation	Country
29	2024	Ryu Seong-hie	Art director	South Korea
30	2025	Sylvia Chang	Director, screenwriter, and producer	Taiwan
31	2026	Ann Hui	Hong Kong filmmaker and actress	Hong Kong

== Busan Awards ==
From 2025, in celebration of the 30th anniversary, festival started a new competition segment featuring approximately 14 Asian films, and various 'Busan Awards' such as Best Film, Best Director, Special Jury Prize, Best Actor for two individuals, and an Artistic Contribution accolade.

=== Best Film Award ===
No.	Year	English title	Original title	Director	Country
30	2025	Gloaming in Luomu	罗目的黄昏	Zhang Lü	China

=== Special Jury Award ===
No.	Year	English title	Original title	Director	Country
30	2025	Funky Freaky Freaks	충충충	Han Chang-lok	South Korea

=== Best Director Award ===
No.	Year	Director	Film	Nationality of director
30	2025	Shu Qi	Girl 女孩	Taiwan

=== Best Actor Award ===
No.	Year	Actor	Film	Nationality of actor
30	2025	Lee Ji-won	En Route To	South Korea
30	2025	Takumi Kitamura	Baka's Identity	Japan
30	2025	Yuta Hayashi	Baka's Identity	Japan
30	2025	Go Ayano	Baka's Identity	Japan
31	2026	Zhou Xun	The First Taste of Loneliness	China
31	2026	Kashun Himeno	Satoko Always	Japan

=== Artistic Contribution Award ===
No.	Year	Recipient(s)	Film	Native title	Country
30	2025	Liu Qiang, Tu Nan	Resurrection	狂野时代	China

== Gallery ==
Busan Cinema Center, the BIFF's headquarters

Busan Cinema Center

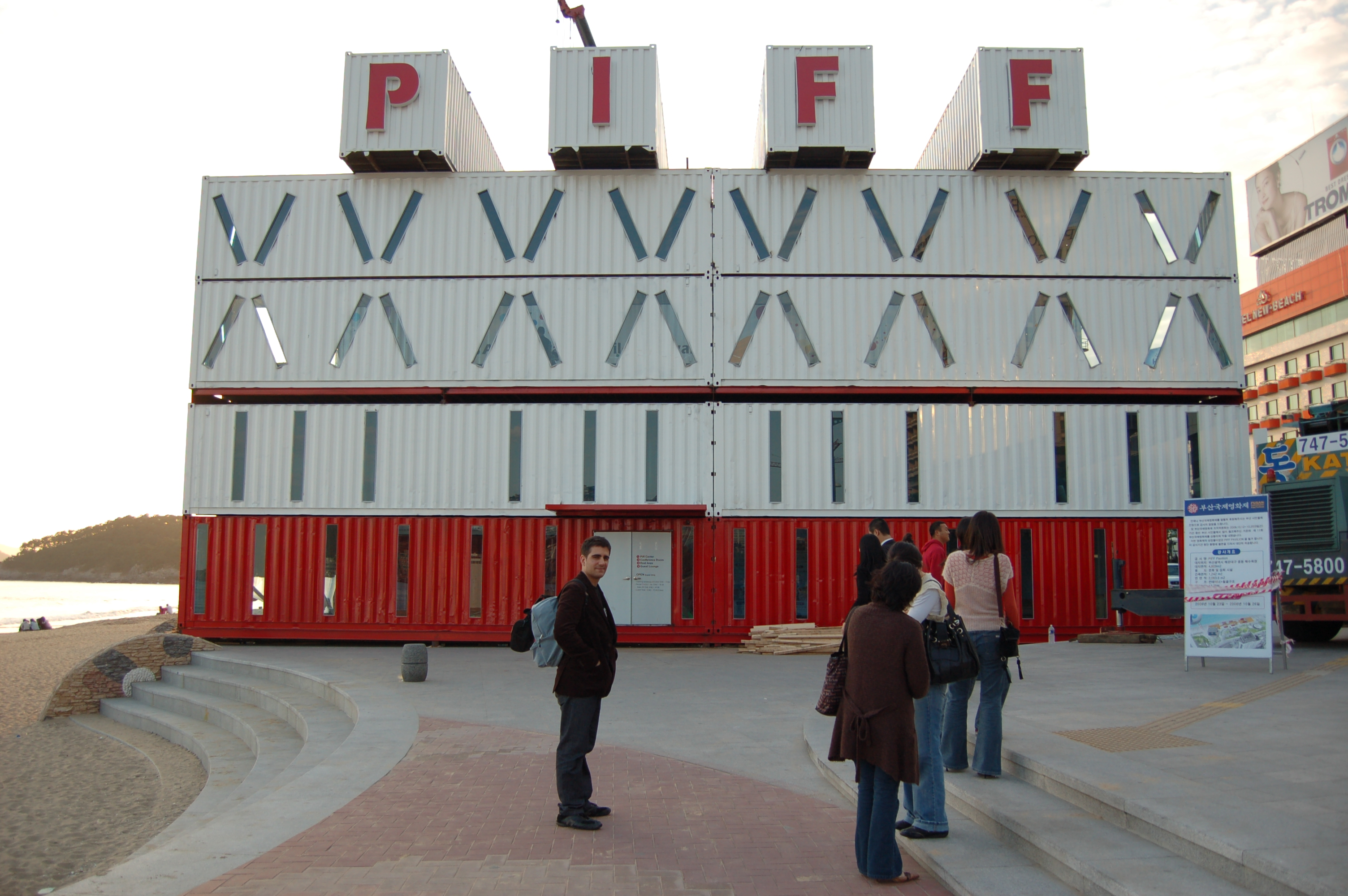
2006 BIFF Pavilion in Haeundae Beach

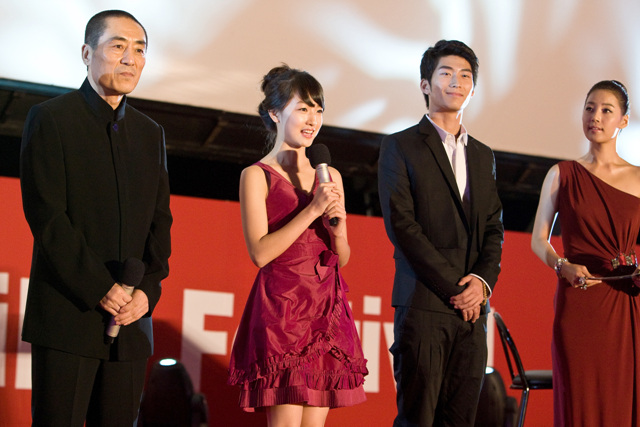
The Opening Film Under the Hawthorn Tree by the dir. Zhang Yimou, 2010

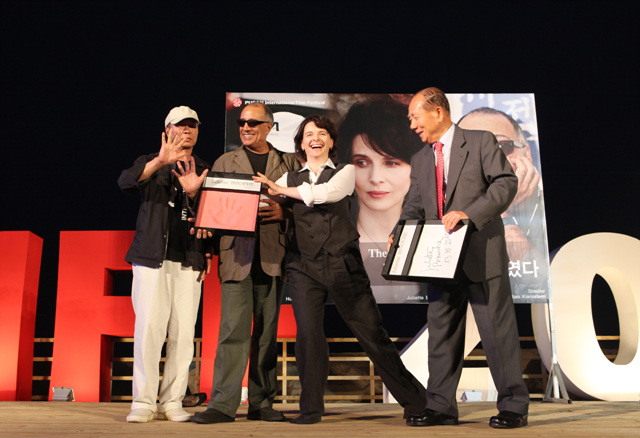
Handprinting, Abbas Kiarostami Juliette Binoche, 2010

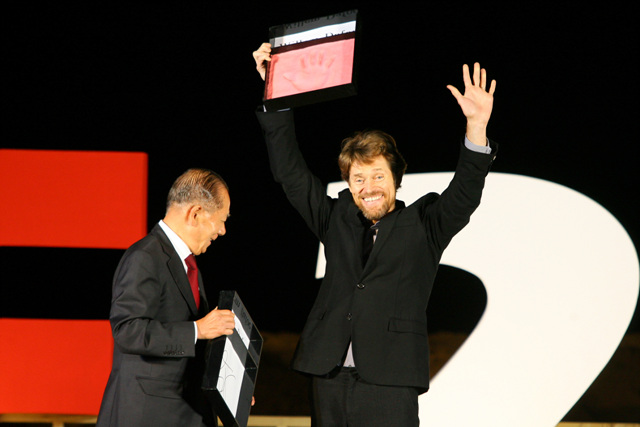
Handprinting, Willem Dafoe, 2010

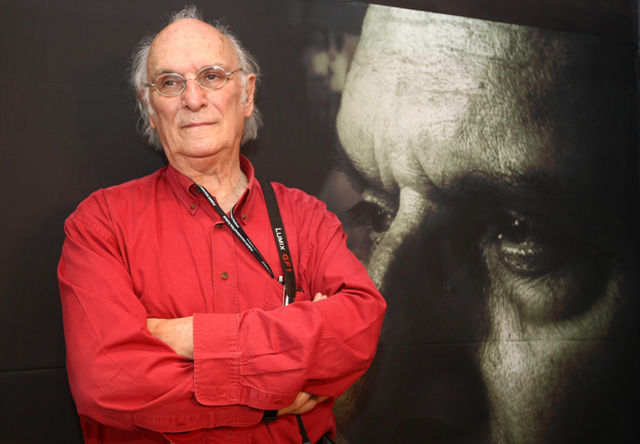
Master Class, Carlos Saura, 2010

== See also ==
- List of film festivals in South Korea
- Cinema of Korea
- Busan International Comedy Festival
- Busan International Fireworks Festival
- Busan International Mobility Show (BIMOS)
- Culture of South Korea
