= Shin Sun-nam =

Shin Sun-nam may refer to:

- Nikolai Shin (1928–2006), Uzbekistani painter of Korean descent
- Shin Sun-nam (footballer) (born 1981), South Korean footballer
