= Jung Hanseok =

South Korean film critic

Jung Hanseok (Korean: 정한석) is the director of the Busan International Film Festival, a position he was appointed to in 2025. He is serving a four-year term that began on March 21, 2025.

== Career ==
He served as a journalist and critic for the Korean film magazine Cine21, where he was noted for his industry analysis. Jung initially caught the film industry’s attention by winning the Cine21 Film Criticism Award in 2002.

Before being appointed as festival director, Jung had served as the festival’s Korean cinema programmer for six years, starting in 2019, where he made an effort to bridge the local South Korean film industry with the festival. In that role, he also was credited for discovering and supporting emerging Korean filmmaking talent.

== Busan International Film Festival Director ==
Initially, Jung had not applied for the festival director job, which had been empty since a series of high-profile resignations in 2023 including festival director Huh Moonyung and managing director Cho Jongkook. After three rounds of the search for the director fell through, Jung applied in the fourth round, in part because of the time pressures of the approaching 30th anniversary festival in September 2025.

In his first year as the festival director in 2025, Jung launched the festival’s first-ever competition section, which he considered an integration form of the previous New Currents and Jiseok sections.

In 2025, with six months of preparation, the new competition section resulted in increased geographic balance, with the BIFF selections including representation across Japan, China, and Korea. The competition also featured an inaugural trophy, designed by Palme d’Or winner Apichatpong Weerasethakul. For BIFF 2025, Jung also included a Special Program in Focus, which was titled “Defining Moments of Asian Cinema Forum” intended to address pressing issues in Asian cinema today.

Jung has stated that his focus for BIFF lies in paving “a truly transformative journey” where “all sections “coexist, none falling behind or being neglected, but working in harmony as a whole” to recement the Korean film industry.
