= Walnut Tree (2015 film) =

- Film poster
- Directed by: Yerlan Nurmukhambetov
- Written by: Yerlan Nurmukhambetov; Yerzhan Rustembekov
- Produced by: Yerzhan Akhmetov
- Starring: Rustem Zhaniamanov; Balnur Asyl
- Cinematography: Murat Nugmanov
- Edited by: Aibol Kasymzhanov
- Music by: Sultan Abetov
- Production company: Kazakhfilm
- Release date: October 2015 (BIFF)
- Running time: 81 minutes
- Country: Kazakhstan
- Language: Kazakh

Walnut Tree (Kazakh: Жаңғақ тал, Jangaq tal) is a 2015 Kazakhstani film directed by Yerlan Nurmukhambetov in his feature debut. It tells the story of a wedding comedy that shows the everyday lives of people living in a small village in Kazakhstan. It made its world premiere at the 20th Busan International Film Festival in 2015 and won the New Currents Award. It also won the Critics Jury Award at the Vesoul International Film Festival of Asian Cinema in France, and the Tulpar Award for Best Film at the Kazakh National Academy of Cinema Arts and Sciences on September 30, 2016.

== Synopsis ==
Gabit and Aisulu, a young couple from a village in southern Kazakhstan, falls in love and plans to get married. But according to the local tradition, the groom ought to steal the future bride.

== Cast ==
- Rustem Zhanyamanov
- Balnur Asyl
- Nurzhan Zhumanov
- Asylbek Musabekov

== Film festivals ==
- Busan International Film Festival 2015 — New Currents — GRAND PRIX;
- Warsaw International Film Festival 2015;
- Vesoul International Film Festival 2016 — MENTION SPECIALE JURY INTERNATIONAL;
- Fajr International Film Festival 2016 — BEST ASIAN FILM;
- Minneapolis St. Paul International Film Festival 2016 (MSPIFF — 35th) — Asian Frontiers;
- International Film Festival Innsbruck 2016 — AUDIENCE AWARD;
- Screening at National Museum of Ethnology, Osaka, Japan;
- Focus on Asia International Film Festival 2016, Fukuoka, Japan;
- Film festival in Tokyo by MoFA, Japan;
- Kazakh National «TULPAR» awards 2016 — Director of the year, Film of the year;
- Kazakh Critic's Choice 2016 — Best Film
- Petaluma International Film Festival, USA
- Hanoi International Film Festival 2016
- International Bosphorus Film Festival 2016, Turkey (nominees — Best Director, Best DOP, Best Editor, Best Actor)
- San Paolo International Film Festival 2016

== Awards and nominations ==
Year	Award	Category	Recipient	Result
2015	20th Busan International Film Festival	New Currents Award	Walnut Tree	Won
2016	Vesoul International Film Festival	Critics Jury Award	Walnut Tree	Won
