= Eyelids (film) =

- Theatrical poster
- Hangul: 눈꺼풀
- RR: Nunkkeopul
- MR: Nunkkŏp'ul
- Directed by: O Muel
- Written by: O Muel
- Produced by: Kwon Mi-hui
- Starring: Moon Seok-beom; Lee Sang-hee; Sung Min-chul; Lee Ji-hoon; Kang Hee
- Cinematography: Sung Min-chul
- Edited by: O Muel
- Music by: Chung Chae-woong
- Distributed by: Jinjin Pictures
- Release dates: October 3, 2015 (BIFF); April 12, 2018 (South Korea)
- Running time: 85 minutes
- Country: South Korea
- Language: Korean
- Box office: US$7,892

Eyelids (Korean: 눈꺼풀) is a 2015 South Korean drama starring Moon Seok-beom. Written and directed by O Muel, it follows an old man living a monk-like ascetic life on an island. Feeling frustrated and powerless while watching the news coverage in the aftermath of the Sewol ferry disaster on April 16, 2014, O wrote the script in three days to offer a way to console the souls of the dead. It made its world premiere at the 20th Busan International Film Festival in 2015 and won the CGV Arthouse Award and DGK Award.

== Plot ==
An old man (Moon Seok-beom) living a monk-like ascetic life on an island. A phone rings, followed by a visitor for whom the man prepares the rice cakes, the last meal before the visitor journeys to the next world.

== Cast ==
- Moon Seok-beom as old man
- Lee Sang-hee
- Sung Min-chul
- Lee Ji-hoon
- Kang Hee

== Awards and nominations ==
Year	Award	Category	Recipient	Result
2015	20th Busan International Film Festival	CGV Arthouse Award	Eyelids	Won
2015	20th Busan International Film Festival	DGK Award	Eyelids	Won
2019	6th Wildflower Film Awards	Best Music	Chung Chae-woong	Won
