= Immortal (2015 film) =

- Directed by: Seyed Hadi Mohaghegh
- Written by: Seyed Hadi Mohaghegh
- Produced by: Reza Mohaghegh; Majid Barzegar
- Starring: Yadolah Shadmani; Meysam Farhomand
- Cinematography: Rozbeh Raiga
- Edited by: Majid Barzegar
- Production company: Majid Barzegar Productions
- Release date: October 2015 (BIFF)
- Running time: 94 minutes
- Country: Iran
- Language: Luri

Immortal (translit. Mamiro) is a 2015 Iranian film directed by Seyed Hadi Mohaghegh. The second feature film by Mohaghegh, it tells the story of an old man who tries to end his life repeatedly from guilt over the loss of his family in a tragic accident. World premiered at the 20th Busan International Film Festival in 2015 and described by the jury Sylvia Chang as "an extraordinary feat of visual storytelling, filled with emotion," it won the top prize for the New Currents competition section, as well as the FIPRESCI award.

== Plot ==
Ayaz is filled with grief and guilt over the loss of his family. A few years ago, when returning from a wedding party, he was driving the mini-bus that killed all his family. He had attempted to end his life numerous times but is saved by his grandson, Ebrahim, who tries to help him overcome his misery.

== Cast ==
- Yadolah Shadmani as Ayaz
- Meysam Farhomand as Ebrahim
- Fatemeh Bahador as Narges
- Parisa Viseli
- Mahyar Abravan
- Tolo Jahanbazi

== Reception ==
BIFF's jury Sylvia Chang: "Immortal is an extraordinary feat of visual storytelling, filled with emotion. It is partly about how to die, but mostly about how to live, and how to keep our dignity as human beings. It is a beautiful film."

BIFF's Kim Ji-seok: "...It is hard to find a film such as this one that is so thoroughly able to deliver to the audience the pain of a being human."

FIPRESCI's Hiroaki Saito: "Why do humans continue to live and why do humans die? Audiences from different cultures can universally identify their own end of life with the theme. The film has a magical power and can let everyone can share in it."

NETPAC Asia's Andreas Ungerböck: "This Iranian film is outstanding in the true sense of the word, both visually and in regard to its narrative and its storytelling...Together they have created a stunning and extraordinary film which deserves all the attention it can get."

FIPRESCI's Mo Abdi: "Mamiroo is a great experience from a young filmmaker (after his first feature, Bardou), who is walking on the edge in this film and is not scared to create a visual structure to build an experience."

== Awards and nominations ==
| Year | Award | Category | Recipient | Result |
|---|---|---|---|---|
| 2015 | 20th Busan International Film Festival | New Currents Award | Immortal | Won |
| 2015 | 20th Busan International Film Festival | FIPRESCI Award | Immortal | Won |
| 2016 | 14th Pune International Film Festival | Best Film | Immortal | Won |
| 2016 | 13th Yerevan International Film Festival | Silver Apricot for Feature Film | Immortal | Won |
| 2016 | 13th Yerevan International Film Festival | Ecumenical Jury Award | Immortal | Won |
| 2016 | 14th Pacific Meridian Film Festival | NETPAC Award | Immortal | Won |
