= Scent of Wind =

2022 film by Hadi Mohaghegh

- Persian: درب
- Directed by: Hadi Mohaghegh
- Written by: Hadi Mohaghegh
- Produced by: Reza Mohaghegh
- Starring: Hadi Mohaghegh; Mohammad Eghbali
- Cinematography: Mansour Abd-Rezaei
- Edited by: Farshad Abbasi
- Music by: Mohammad Darabifar
- Distributed by: Persian Film Distribution
- Release date: October 5, 2022 (BIFF)
- Running time: 90 minutes
- Country: Iran
- Language: Persian

Scent of Wind (Persian: درب, lit. 'Derb') is a 2022 Iranian drama film written and directed by Hadi Mohaghegh. It stars Mohaghegh and Mohammad Eghbali in lead roles. The film premiered as the opening film of the 27th Busan International Film Festival and won the Kim Jiseok Award there. It later received the Silver Montgolfière at the Festival des 3 Continents.

== Cast ==
- Hadi Mohaghegh as the electrician
- Mohammad Eghbali as the father
- Amir Abbas Eskandari
- Hamdollah Azizi
- Abdollah Nouri
- Tolokhan Jahanbazi
- Yavar Takhsha
- Golijan Fathi
- Rohollah Barzegar
- Mehdi Beheshtipoor
- Maryam Beheshtipoor
- Hosein Eskandari
- Mohammad Vaseli
- Mohammad Kamal Alavi
- Jesus Kheybarmanesh
- Amir-Mehdi Nouri
- Maahatb Azizi

== Release ==
The film had its international premiere as the opening film of the 27th Busan International Film Festival on 5 October 2022.

It was subsequently selected for the official competition of the 44th Festival des 3 Continents in Nantes.

In May 2023, the film was released theatrically in France by Persian Film Distribution.

== Reception ==
Writing for Variety, Peter Debruge described the film as a simple tale of kindness and situated it in the tradition of Iranian art cinema. Reviewing the film for Screen Daily, Allan Hunter wrote that its static compositions and unhurried pacing produce a gentle, meditative drama, drawing comparisons with the work of Abbas Kiarostami.

== Awards and nominations ==
The film won the Kim Jiseok Award at the Busan International Film Festival and the Silver Montgolfière at the Festival des 3 Continents. It was also nominated for the Golden Montgolfière at the latter festival.

Year	Award / festival	Category	Result	Ref.
2022	Busan International Film Festival	Kim Jiseok Award	Won	
2022	Festival des 3 Continents	Golden Montgolfière	Nominated	
2022	Festival des 3 Continents	Silver Montgolfière	Won	
