= Nikolai Shin =

Korean Soviet painter (1928–2006)

Korean name
- Hangul: 신순남
- Hanja: 申順南
Transcriptions
- Revised Romanization: Sin Sunnam
- McCune–Reischauer: Sin Sunnam

Russian name
- Russian: Николай Сергеевич Шин
- Romanization: Nikolay Sergeevich Shin

Nikolai Shin (1928 in Dalnegorsk, Primorsky Krai, Soviet Union – August 18, 2006 in Tashkent, Uzbekistan) was an Uzbekistani painter of Korean descent, sometimes referred to by Korean newspapers as the "Picasso of Asia".

== Biography ==
=== Early life ===
Shin's childhood was filled with hardships. His father died at the age of 21, when Shin was only 4. His mother remarried the following year, sending him and his sister to live with their grandmother. In 1937, he and his family were deported to Central Asia along with all other ethnic Koreans in the Russian Far East. After the deportations, his family stayed in the Kazakh SSR for a few years before eventually settling in Tashkent, Uzbek SSR (now Uzbekistan) in 1940. His sister became infected with malaria and died at the age of 16, leaving Shin as sole breadwinner for his mother and grandmother; Shin spoke of his memories of tilling the rocky soil with his bare hands, trying to eke out a living. Eventually, unable to care for his grandmother, he sent her to live with relatives in the Kazakh SSR, where she too died.

=== Artistic career ===
A panel from Requiem

In 1949, Shin graduated from Tashkent's Benkov Art School, and began his career in painting, first receiving acclaim for his work in 1957, when he won the grand prize at the International Youth Festival in Moscow and the second prize in the Republican Festival of Young Artists of Uzbekistan. In 1960, he graduated from Atropsky Art College, also in Tashkent; after his graduation, he began work on his painting Requiem, which would take him until 1982 to complete. Requiem, painted on a canvas three metres tall and forty-four metres wide in primary colors, depicts people without eyes, noses, or mouths; Shin has stated that this was meant to represent the sense of enslavement and namelessness felt by the Koryo-saram as a result of the deportations. Following his completion of Requiem, Shin would go on to paint other works on the theme of the deportations and of Korean culture in Central Asia; he began to become well known in the West with his solo exhibition in Moscow in 1990, and another in Tashkent in 1991. Eventually, his art attracted the attention of the Central Asian-American Enterprise Fund, who offered him financial support, enabling him to hold further exhibitions. His work was recognised by the Korean government in 1997, when they awarded him with the Order of Culture Merit (문화훈장); he then donated Requiem to the Museum of Contemporary Art.

Aside from his own artwork, Shin also took up a teaching post at his alma mater, the Benkov Art School, despite the low salary; he became a mentor to his student Elena Lee, another Uzbekistani painter of Korean descent, whose work was featured in 2004 at an exhibition in Almaty, Kazakhstan. He died August 18, 2006, in Tashkent, Uzbekistan. He is survived by a wife and three sons.

== Documentary ==
- Sky-Blue Hometown
- Hangul: 하늘색 고향
- Hanja: 하늘色 古鄉
- RR: Haneulsaek gohyang
- MR: Hanŭlsaek kohyang

In 2001, Shin's life story was made into a documentary film Sky-Blue Hometown, directed by Kim So-young. Kim stated that she was inspired to tell Shin's story after seeing Requiem displayed at the National Museum of Contemporary Art and reading articles in the domestic press about Koreans in Uzbekistan. Through the film, she hoped "to convey the earnest wishes and lost dreams of the victims, rather than render a bleak ambiance of the hurt and resentment endured by Koreans as a minority race in the former Soviet Union and Central Asia at the present time." After completing the film, she was disappointed by the initial lack of domestic interest; though it won grand prize at the Seoul International Documentary and Film Festival and was honoured as the best Korean documentary at the Pusan International Film Festival, local distributors remained uninterested in the film. Sky-Blue Hometown would go on to be invited to several international film festivals in 2001, including the Asian American International Film Festival in New York, the Yamagata International Documentary Film Festival in Japan, the International Documentary Film Festival Amsterdam, and the International Festival of Audio-visual Programs in Paris. In November of the following year, it won the Network for the Promotion of Asian Cinema prize at the Taiwan International Documentary Festival. However, it was not shown in cinemas in Korea until 2003.

=== Credits ===
- Director: Kim So-young
- Production: Cine-Maya
- Screenplay: Kim So-young
- Photography: Nikolay Gerasimov
- Editing: Kim So-young
- Sound: Won-jong Soh
- Music: Duck Hyun, Jun-sung Kim, Young-jo Lee
- World Sales: Cine-Maya
- Screening copy: Korean Film Commission

== Works ==
=== Exhibitions ===
- 1990: Trechakopskaya Art Gallery, Moscow
- 1991: National Museum of Art, Tashkent
- 1995: National Museum of Art, Tashkent
- 1997: Korean National Museum of Contemporary Art, Seoul
- 2006: Korean Culture Day, Tashkent

=== Paintings ===
Works in chronological order
Title (Hangul and RR)	Translation	Year of completion	Size	Comments
어머니와 딸 (Eomeoniwa Ddal)	Mother and daughter	1980	Unknown	
레퀴엠 (Rekuiem)	Requiem	1982	44×3 metres	
장미색의 눈 (Jangmisaek'eui Nun)	Rose-coloured snow	1985	Unknown	
수콕 메달들 (Sukok Medaldeul)	Sukok medals	1987	240×170 cm	
하늘색의 고향 (Haneulsaek'eui Gohyang)	Sky-blue hometown	1988	8×3 metres	4 panels of 200×300 cm
되살린 부채 (Toesallin Buchae)		1989	80×100 cm	
또다른 세계로-천국에서의 신혼 (Ddodareun Segyero - Cheongukeso'eui Sinhon)	To another world - newlywed in paradise	1990	8×3 metres	4 panels of 200×300 cm
나와 아내 (Nawa Anae)	Me and my wife	1991	Unknown	
고려인 (Goryeoin)	Koryo people	Unknown	Unknown	
검은 용 (Geomeun Yong)	Black dragon	Unknown	Unknown	
전설 (Jeonseol)	Legend	Unknown	52×3 metres	26 panels of 200×300 cm
자화상 (Jahwajang)	Self-portrait	Unknown	Unknown	
나와 나의 신부 (Nawa Na'eui Shinbu)	Me and my bride	Unknown	Unknown	
수코크의 아이들 (Sukokeu'eui Aideul)	The children of Sukok	Unknown	Unknown	
울음 (Uleum)	Tears	Unknown	Unknown	
