= Shahin Parhami =

Iranian director

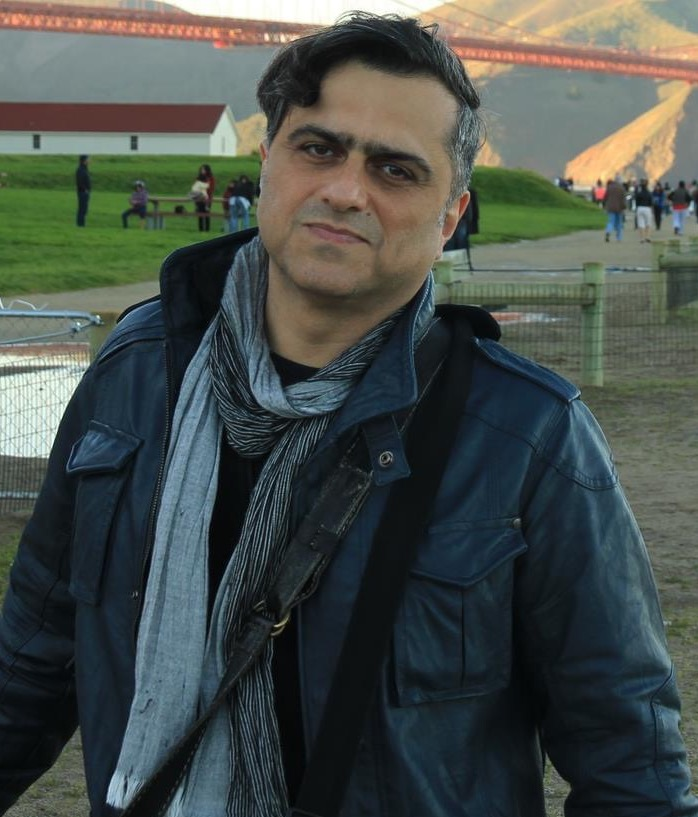
- Parhami in 2013
- Born: 1967; Shiraz, Iran
- Died: 13 March 2021 (aged 53–54); Montreal, Quebec, Canada
- Citizenship: Iran; Canada
- Education: Concordia University (B.F.A)
- Occupations: Director; writer; producer; editor; cinematographer
- Years active: 1997–2021

Shahin Parhami (Persian: شاهين پرهامى, born 1967) was an Iranian-Canadian film director, writer, editor, and cinematographer based in Montreal, Quebec. He is best known for his work on the documentaries Amin and Shahrzaad's Tale.

== Life and career ==
Parhami was born in Shiraz, Iran in 1967 and immigrated to Canada in 1988, where he studied film first at Carleton University in Ottawa, later earning his B.F.A in Film Production from Concordia University in Montreal. He started his film career with the early trilogy, Nasoot (1997), Lahoot (1998), and Jabaroot (2003).

In 2010, Parhami's documentary AMIN, which chronicles the efforts of a Qashqai violinist to preserve his community's musical traditions, won the Award of Excellence at the Yamagata International Documentary Film Festival. In 2015, his film Shahrzaad's Tale, about an iconic star of popular Iranian cinema, was nominated for Best Feature Documentary at the Asia Pacific Screen Awards. His work has received acclaim from film critics. Peter Rist praises "the challenging, experimental approach to film form that he consistently adopts." A new film, Marcel, centers the art and life of a major Canadian sculptor and is currently in post-production. It is set for release in 2021, along with his feature fiction debut, Every Angel is Terrifying.

Parhami died from a rare and aggressive cancer called plasma cell leukemia in Montreal on 13 March 2021. Parhami leaves behind his brother and sister, nieces and nephews, and a wide circle of friends.

== Filmography ==
| Year | Title | Contribution | Note |
|---|---|---|---|
| 1997 | Nasoot | Writer/Director/Cinematographer/Editor/Producer | |
| 1998 | Lahoot | Writer/Director/Cinematographer/Editor/Producer | |
| 2002 | Amnesia | Writer/Director/Cinematographer/Editor/Producer | |
| 2003 | Jabaroot | Writer/Director/Cinematographer/Editor/Producer | |
| 2004 | Raga Malkauns | Writer/Director/Cinematographer/Editor/Producer | |
| 2007 | Faces | Writer/Director/Cinematographer/Editor/Producer | |
| 2009 | Shiraz 1340... | Director/Producer | |
| 2010 | Amin | Director/Cinematographer/Editor/Producer | |
| 2015 | Shahrzaad's Tale | Writer/Director/Cinematographer/Editor/Producer | |
| 2021 | Marcel | Writer/Director/Cinematographer/Editor/Producer | |
| 2021 | Every Angel is Terrifying | Writer/Director/Cinematographer/Editor/Producer | |
