= Seyed Hadi Mohaghegh =

Iranian film director and screenwriter

Seyed Hadi Mohaghegh سید هادی محقق
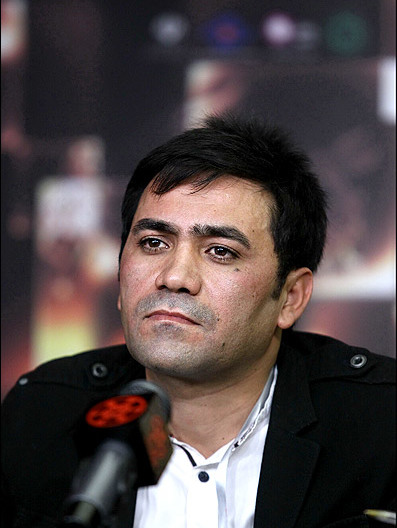
- Born: 1979 (age 46–47); Dehdasht, Kohgiluyeh and Boyer-Ahmad province, Iran
- Occupations: Film director screenwriter
- Years active: 1990-present

Seyed Hadi Mohaghegh (Persian: سید هادی محقق; born 1979) is an Iranian film director and screenwriter.

== Career ==
Born in Dehdasht, Iran, in 1979, Mohaghegh studied Automobile Mechanics. He began his artistic career in 1990 as a theatre actor and director, and in 2000 for television as an actor, designer and assistant director. In 2010, he started making films for television. In 2013, he made his first feature film Bardou which won Best Film, Best Director and Best Original Screenplay at the 2013 Isfahan IFF for Children and Young Adults. His second feature Immortal (2015), based on a story about an old woman but was adapted to that of an old man as showing of the female body is not permitted in Iran, won numerous awards at film festivals.

== Filmography ==
Year	Film	Credited as		Length	Notes
Year	Film	Director	Writer	Length	Notes
2010	Brothers of My Land	Yes		90 minutes	TV drama
2012	A Look into the Sky	Yes		42 minutes	Documentary
2012	It May Also Happen to You	Yes		45 minutes	Short fiction
2013	Bardou	Yes	Yes	85 minutes	Feature
2015	Immortal	Yes	Yes	94 minutes	Feature
2018	Here	Yes	Yes	82 minutes	Feature
2022	Scent of Wind	Yes	Yes	90 minutes	Feature

== Awards ==
- 2013 Isfahan Film Festival for Children and Young Adults: Best Director (Bardou)
