= IU filmography =

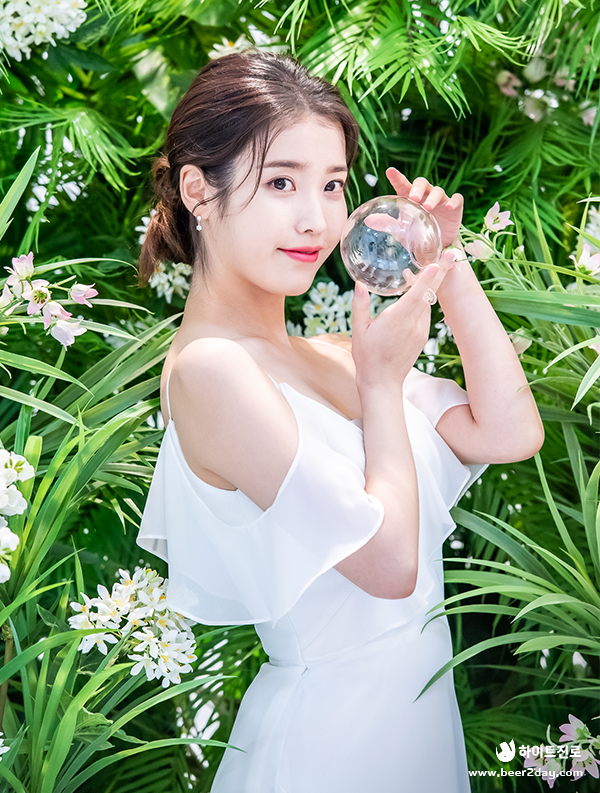
- IU in 2021
- Film: 5
- Television series: 12
- Web series: 1
- Television show: 3
- Hosting: 10
- Others: 2

Lee Ji-eun (born May 16, 1993), professionally known as IU, is a South Korean singer-songwriter and actress.

== Film ==
Year	Film	Role	Notes	Ref.
2012	A Turtle's Tale 2: Sammy's Escape from Paradise	Ella (voice)	Korean dub	
2017	Real	A ceremony guide	Cameo	
2019	Shades of the Heart	Mi-young		
2022	Broker	Moon So-young		
2023	Dream	Lee So-min		
2023	IU Concert: The Golden Hour	Herself		
2025	IU Concert: The Winning	Herself		

== Television series ==
Year	Title	Role	Notes	Ref.
2011	Dream High	Kim Pil-suk		
2012	Salamander Guru and The Shadows	Pickpocket Jieun	Cameo (Episode 6)	
2012	Dream High 2	Kim Pil-suk	Cameo (Episode 1)	
2013	You Are the Best!	Lee Soon-shin		
2013	Bel Ami	Kim Bo-tong		
2015	The Producers	Cindy		
2016	Moon Lovers: Scarlet Heart Ryeo	Go Ha-jin / Hae Soo		
2018	My Mister	Lee Ji-an		
2019	Persona	IU / Eun / Han-na / Ji-eun	Anthology series	
2019	Hotel del Luna	Jang Man-wol		
2025	When Life Gives You Tangerines	Oh Ae-sun / Yang Geum-myeong		
2026	Perfect Crown	Seong Hui-ju		

== Television shows ==
Year	Title	Role	Notes	Ref.
2010–2011	Heroes	Cast member		
2011	Welcome to the Show	Herself		
2011	Kim Yuna's Kiss & Cry	Contestant	As figure skater	
2017	Hyori's Homestay (Season 1)	Cast member		

== Hosting ==
Year	Title	Ref.
2009	IU Star Nutrition	
2009–2010	Gomtv Music Chart Show (GMC)	
2010	28th MBC Creative Synchronicity Festival	
2011	50 years TV entertainment	
2011–2013	Inkigayo	
2012	Quiz Show Q	
2012	SBS Gayo Daejeon	
2014	Tray Relay Song	
2015	SBS Gayo Daejeon	
2017	SBS Gayo Daejeon	

== Video games ==
Year	Title	Developer	Role	Notes	Ref.
2012–2013	Aion: The Tower of Eternity	NCSoft	Supporting role	Spokesmodel and In-game model	
2013	Sudden Attack	Nexon	Supporting role	In-game model	
2019	Sudden Attack	Nexon	Supporting role	In-game model	
