= Fashion King =

Fashion King may also refer to:

- Fashion King (manhwa), a 2011 manhwa
- Fashion King (film), a 2014 film
- Fashion King (TV series), a 2012 TV series
- Fashion King Korea, a 2013 TV series
