= Sulli =

South Korean singer and actress (1994–2019)

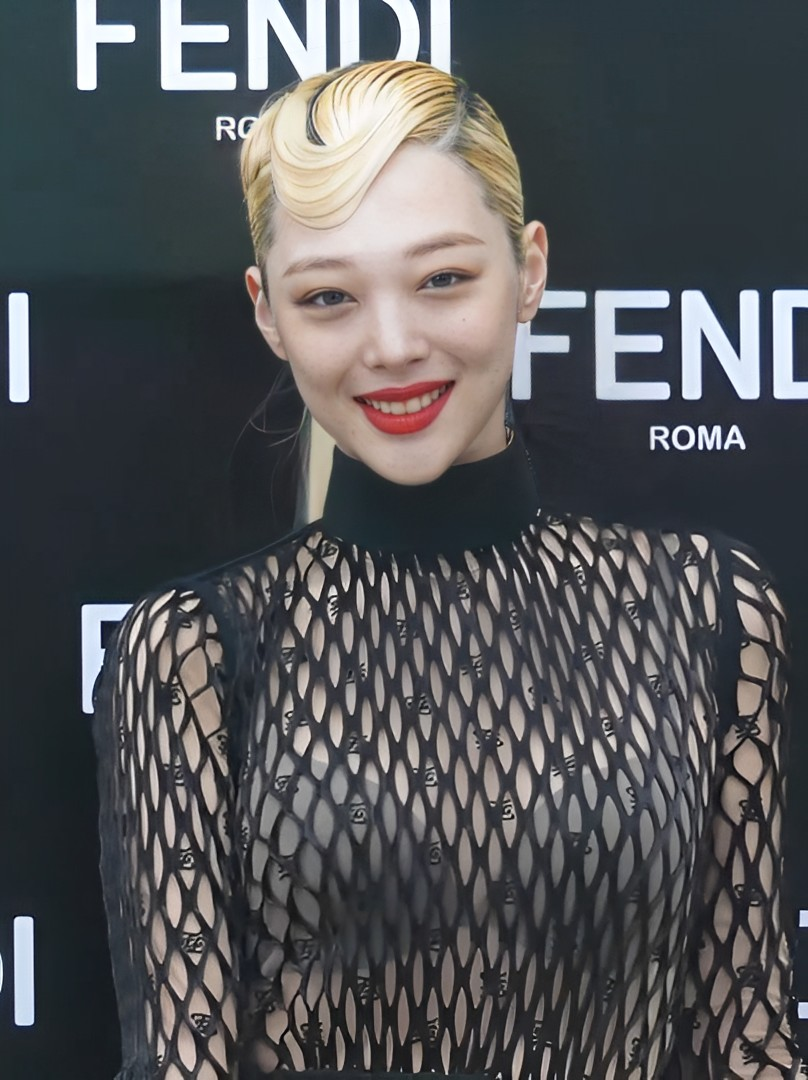
- Sulli in September 2019
- Born: Choi Jin-ri; March 29, 1994; Busan, South Korea
- Died: October 13, 2019 or October 14, 2019 (aged 25); Seongnam, South Korea
- Cause of death: Suicide by hanging
- Burial place: Yangsu-ri, Seoul, South Korea
- Occupations: Singer; actress
- Years active: 2005–2019
- Musical career
- Genre: K-pop
- Instrument: Vocals
- Years active: 2009–2015; 2018–2019
- Label: SM
- Formerly of: f(x)

Korean name
- Hangul: 최진리
- Hanja: 崔真理
- RR: Choe Jinri
- MR: Ch'oe Chilli
- IPA: t͡ɕʰwe̞ t͡ɕiɭ.ɭi

Stage name
- Hangul: 설리
- Hanja: 雪梨
- RR: Seolri
- MR: Sŏlli
- IPA: sʰʌɭ.ɭi

Signature
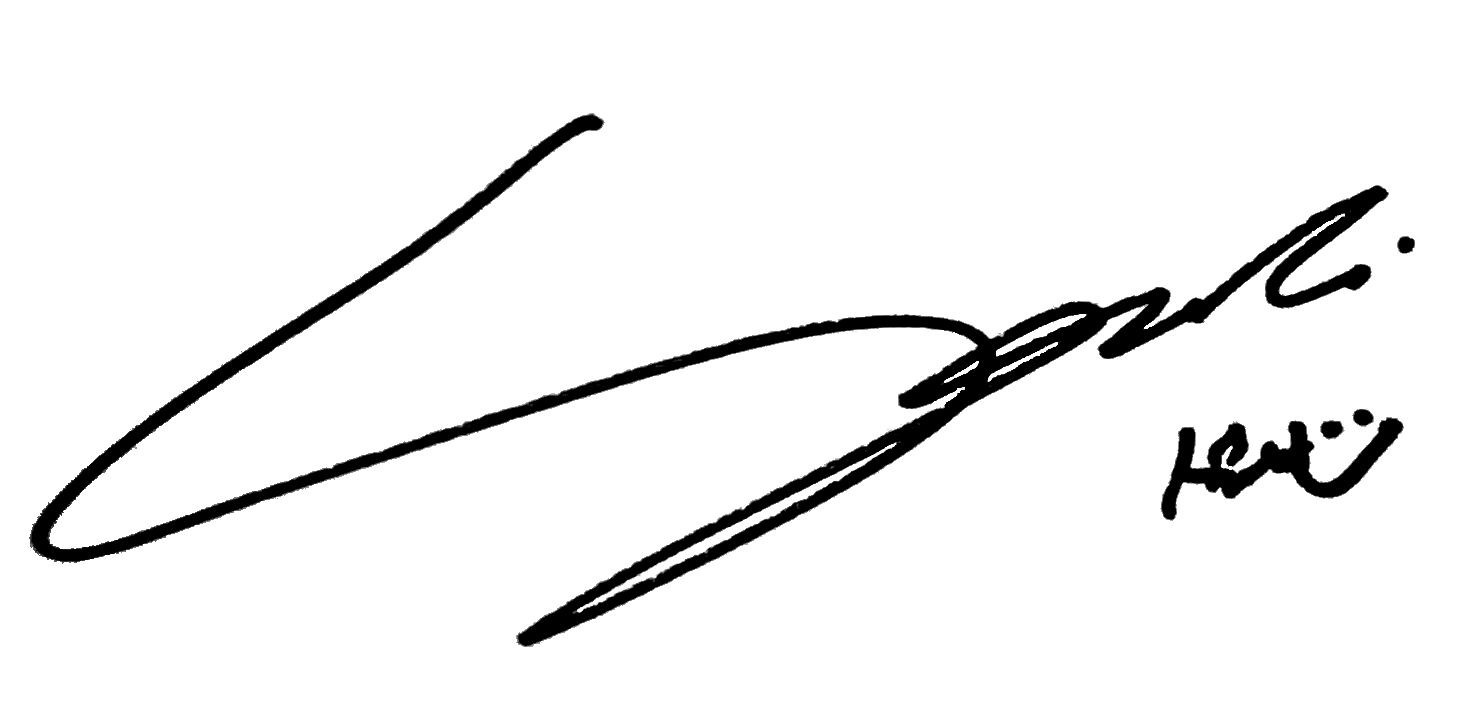

Choi Jin-ri (Korean: 최진리; March 29, 1994 – October 13 or 14, 2019), known professionally as Sulli (/ˈsʌli/), was a South Korean singer and actress. She first made her debut as a child actress, appearing as a supporting cast member on the SBS historical drama Ballad of Seodong (2005). Following this, she earned a number of guest roles, appearing in the television series Love Needs a Miracle (2005) and Drama City (2007), and the film Vacation (2006). She then subsequently appeared in the independent films Punch Lady (2007) and BA:BO (2008), the former being her first time cast in a substantial dramatic role.

After signing a record deal with SM Entertainment, Sulli rose to prominence as a member of the girl group f(x) formed in 2009. The group achieved both critical and commercial success, with four Korean number-one singles and international recognition after becoming the first K-pop act to perform at SXSW. Concurrently with her music career, Sulli returned to acting by starring in the SBS romantic comedy series, To the Beautiful You (2012), a Korean adaptation of the shōjo manga Hana-Kimi where her performance was positively received and earned her two SBS Drama Awards and a nomination at the 49th Paeksang Arts Awards.

Sulli's film career progressed with her starring in the fantasy swashbuckler The Pirates (2014) and the coming-of-age drama Fashion King (2014). During the press tour for The Pirates, Sulli took a hiatus from the entertainment industry due to health issues and following a year long absence from promoting with f(x), she left the group in August 2015. Between 2015 and 2017, she embarked on a number of modelling campaigns before becoming an endorsement model for Estée Lauder. Sulli garnered attention for her role in the experimental neo-noir thriller Real (2017). She later returned to the music industry in 2018, making a guest appearance on Dean's single "Dayfly" and releasing her debut single album Goblin in June 2019, which was her last musical project prior to her death.

Sulli was recognized as a known figure in Korean popular culture for her outspoken persona, becoming the most Googled person in South Korea in 2017.

== Early life ==
Sulli was born on March 29, 1994, in Busan, South Korea. Aspiring to be an actress, Sulli attended Jungbu Elementary School before moving to Seoul by herself in 2004, while in fourth grade, in order to attend the Seoul branch of the MTM Academy, a part-time theatre school where she studied singing, dancing, and acting. She had previously been enrolled in another acting school by her mother at a young age.

Prior to her debut as a child actress and following her signing to SM Entertainment, her stage name was changed from Choi Jin-ri; which means "the truth" in Korean, to Sulli at the suggestion of a reporter who felt her birth name was "too Christian" and that people from other religions would not like it. In one interview, she interpreted her stage name to mean "pear blossoms in the snow".

== Career ==
=== 2005–2008: Career beginnings ===
In 2005, Sulli began acting professionally at the age of 11, when she was selected to play young Princess Seonhwa of Silla in the SBS drama Ballad of Seodong. She continued to take on minor roles in television dramas and movies such as Vacation (2006), Punch Lady (2007), The Flower Girl is Here (2007) and BABO (2008).

When Sulli was in fourth grade, she attended an SM Entertainment audition, during which she sang the S.E.S. song titled Chingu ("Friend"). After the audition she was officially cast as an S.M. trainee and during the same year, moved into a dormitory with Taeyeon and Tiffany of Girls' Generation. She continued to stay there up until the debut of Girls' Generation, in 2007.

=== 2009–2017: Debut with f(x), hiatus, and continued acting career ===
On September 5, 2009, Sulli debuted as a member of the group f(x), with the single "La Cha Ta".

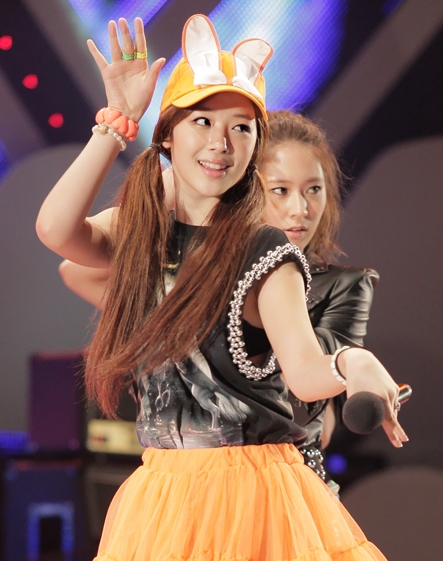
Sulli performing at Seoul Plaza in 2011

In August 2012, Sulli starred as the lead role in To the Beautiful You, based on the famous Japanese shōjo manga series Hanazakari no Kimitachie. The drama series started broadcasting on August 15, 2012, on SBS. Sulli plays Gu Jae-hee, who disguises as a boy in order to attend the same school as her crush. In order to prepare for her role, Sulli who was known for her long hair cut 60 cm of it. She later won the New Star Award at the SBS Drama Awards for her performance in the drama.

In 2013, Sulli and group mate Krystal Jung became the new faces of the makeup brand, Etude House.

In the midst of Red Light promotions, on July 24, 2014, SM Entertainment announced that Sulli decided to take a break from the South Korean entertainment industry due to being mentally and physically exhausted from the continuous malicious comments and rumors of her dating Dynamic Duo rapper Choiza, which was not confirmed at the time, and false rumors of her being pregnant.

Due to her hiatus, she did not participate in the promotion of the 2014 period adventure film The Pirates alongside Son Ye-jin and Kim Nam-gil, where she played a supporting character named Heuk-myo, a young girl who became a pirate after being saved by the female captain. Later that same year, she resumed her acting career by attending the promotion of the 2014 comedy film Fashion King, based on the webtoon series of the same name, where she played a leading role alongside Joo Won and Kim Sung-oh. In August 2015, a year into her hiatus, SM Entertainment announced that Sulli had officially withdrawn from the group.

Between 2015 and 2017, Sulli took part in modelling for various campaigns including for Estée Lauder as an endorsement model. In 2017, Sulli starred in a leading role in the film Real with Kim Soo-hyun as Song Yoo-hwa, a rehabilitation therapist at the hospital which Kim's character frequents. The film was released in June of that year.

=== 2018–2019: Solo career and final projects ===
Sulli was a featured singer in Dean's single "Dayfly", which was released on November 9, 2018, and served as her first release since leaving f(x) in 2015. On June 29, 2019, Sulli made her debut as a solo artist with the single album Goblin, on which she co-wrote and co-produced all of the tracks, and held a special stage Peaches Go!blin on the same day at SM Town Theater.

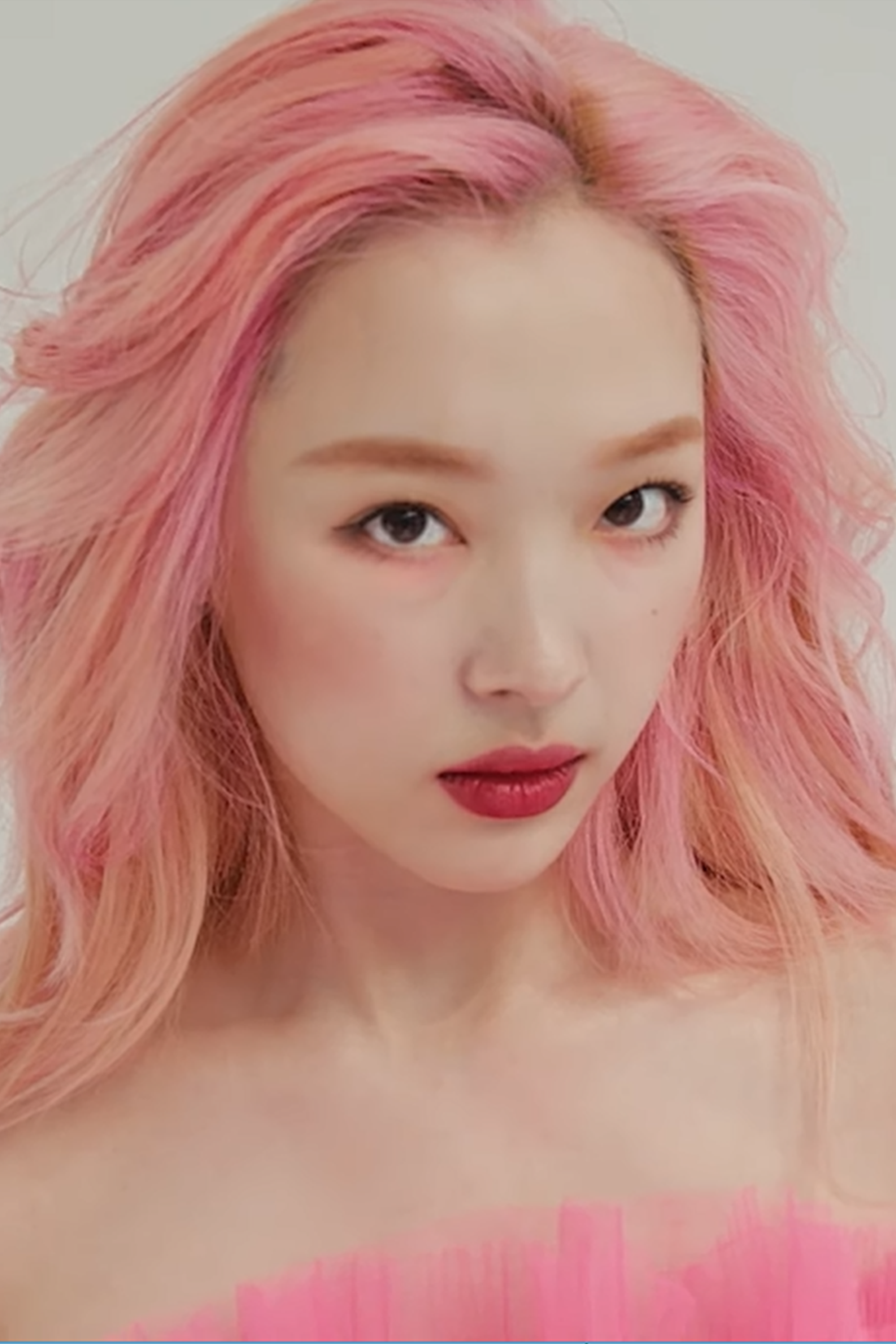
Sulli in a promotional shoot for Esteé Lauder in July 2019

In 2019, Sulli joined the JTBC2 variety program The Night of Hate Comments, which discussed celebrity's reactions to hateful comments, malicious rumors and cyberbullying they had encountered online. On the first episode, during Sulli's turn, she responded cheerfully to the mean spirited comments, a demeanor that gained her a label on the show, "the nuclear bomb of hate comments". She agreed with a commenter that said her biggest success is her social presence on SNS and that she is an attention seeker. She disagreed with a commenter who said she looked like a "druggie" because of her large dilated pupils, saying that she has done nothing illegal, but had studied drug behavior during method acting for her film Real.

She denied going braless to seek attention, saying that for her it was more comfortable, as well as "more natural and prettier", and that she sees bras as an accessory that she sometimes wears. She said, "I wish people would look at me and think, 'Well, someone like that exists!' Accept the difference". While discussing past malicious comments she had received, she said she had started to sue once, but the commenter, a student at a prestigious college, had sent a long letter of apology, and she had forgiven them. However, she said she would not do the same again. On October 14, 2019, the cast and producers recorded another episode, per a Monday scheduling, unaware of Sulli's death, which was reported later in the day.

Sulli was cast as the main lead in the second season of the omnibus Netflix series Persona. On October 23, 2019, Mystic Story revealed they have decided to temporarily suspend production, as Sulli was in the midst of filming the second out of five planned episodes for the series when she died.

== Personal life ==
Between September 2013 and March 2017, Sulli dated Dynamic Duo rapper Choiza, during which both celebrities endured malicious comments and cyberbullying throughout their public relationship.

In October 2018, Sulli revealed that she had struggled with panic disorder and social anxiety disorder since she was young. Prior to her death, Sulli was suffering from severe depression.

== Death and impact ==
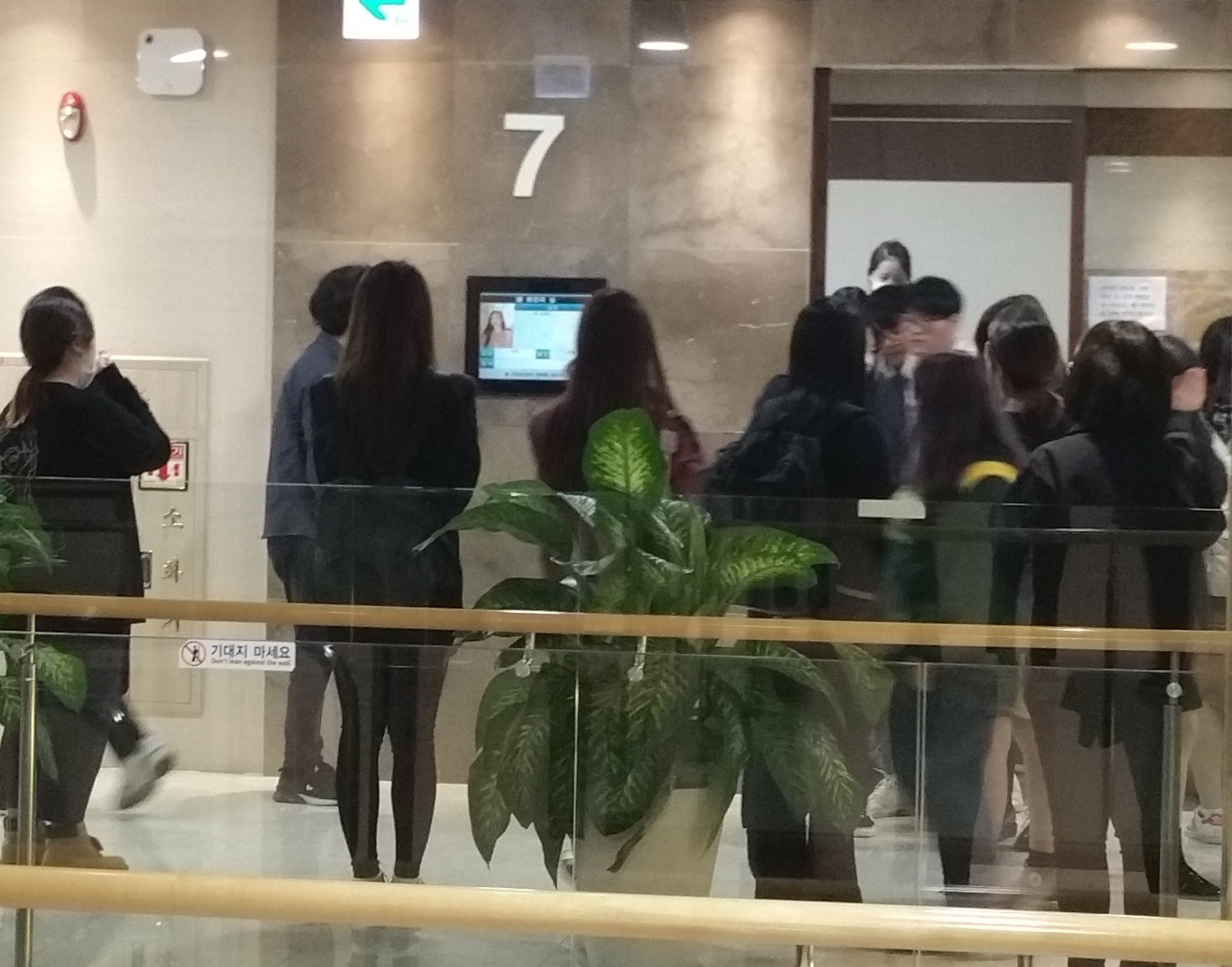
Fans at entrance of memorial hall, Severance Hospital, October 16, 2019

News leaked by an employee in the emergency response center revealed that on October 14, 2019, at approximately 3:20 p.m. KST, Sulli's brother, who was also her manager, found her hanging dead on the second floor of her house in Seongnam, south of Seoul. He reportedly visited the house when he was not able to reach her, having spoken with Sulli on the phone the previous day around 6:30 p.m. KST. Police stated that they were investigating the death as a possible suicide as there were no signs of foul play or a break-in.

They found a handwritten note in her diary in which she described her feelings, but concluded that it was not a suicide note. On October 15, police filed for an autopsy to confirm the cause of death and performed it the following morning, concluding that her body did not show any signs of death due to external force, and it is likely a suicide that occurred on the night of October 13 or the morning of October 14.

The funeral was initially closed to the media as well as fans and was privately held by family members and friends. SM Entertainment opened a separate venue in Severance Hospital's funeral hall in Sinchon-dong, Seoul, on October 15 and 16 for fans wishing to pay tribute. Various celebrities and companies, such as previous bandmates Krystal, Victoria Song, Amber Liu, and Luna, fellow singer and friend IU, Dynamic Duo, and the premiere of the film Gift, canceled their activities in order to mourn Sulli. On October 17, following a four-day private funeral and mourning ceremony at a Seoul hospital, Sulli's remains were buried at an undisclosed location.

Multiple media outlets linked Sulli's death to depression caused by cyberbullying. Prior to her death, it was revealed that Sulli had repeatedly asked her agency, SM Entertainment, to take strong measures against malicious comments and cyberbullying. A total of seven petitions were posted at the South Korean presidential office website demanding tougher punishment for cyberbullying and strengthening use of the real-name system when posting comments and creating accounts.

Political circles discussed various ways to prevent similar events. An act with the proposed title "Sulli Act" was mentioned at a general audit of the Korea Communications Commission on October 21, where Rep. Park Dae-chool of the Liberty Korea Party said he was writing a legislative proposal to enact a new law to increase the responsibility of comments by introducing an Internet real-name system. On October 25, Rep. Park Seon-sook proposed a partial amendment to the Act on Promotion of Information and Communications Network Utilization and Information Protection, which imposes an obligation for information and communication service providers to delete hate comments.

The amendment included marking malicious comments as illegal information, and provide anyone who saw malicious comments, not just the one being attacked, the ability to request its deletion. On the same day, Rep. Park Dae-chool also proposed an amendment to the Act on Promotion of Information and Communications Network Utilization and Information Protection which would allow the disclosure of full names of people posting comments under usernames and strengthen accountability of online comments by disclosing IPs. On October 25, 2019, Kakao announced that they were temporarily disabling comments on entertainment news to prevent hate comments and removing related search terms when searching people's names for a year.

Following her death, "Love You Sulli" (설리 사랑해) started trending in an attempt by fans to hide negative search results. IU's song "Peach", which was written about Sulli, re-entered music charts. Goo Hara, who was Sulli's close friend, died by suicide a month after Sulli's death.

Dear Jinri, a documentary film structured around Sulli's final interview that was shot during the production of Persona shortly before her death, premiered at the 28th Busan International Film Festival on October 7, 2023. The film was released worldwide by Netflix that November, serving as the second episode of Persona: Sulli.

== Public image ==
When I first posted pictures of me braless, there were so many different reactions. I could have been frightened and hide, but I didn't. I wanted people's prejudices to disappear.

— Sulli on the first episode of The Night of Hate Comments in 2019

Following her departure from f(x), Sulli received renewed press attention for her unconventional persona which polarized public reception. Some members of the media branded her as "eccentric" and "forward-thinking", while conservative media outlets considered her to be "inappropriate" and "absurd". Sulli's persona had been parodied on Saturday Night Live Korea.

A number of media outlets attributed the backlash against Sulli to the fact that her public image was not as carefully constructed as many of her contemporaries in the idol industry were, and she directly challenged societal expectations of women in Korean culture. The Associated Press described Sulli as someone who "was known for her feminist voice and outspokenness that was rare among female entertainers in deeply conservative South Korea."

On August 14, 2018, Sulli expressed support for Comfort Women Day, a national memorial day to honor the victims of sexual slavery during World War II by the Imperial Japanese Army. Additionally, Sulli proclaimed that she was an advocate for the no bra movement, having previously been criticized for going braless on several social media posts.

Sulli, in real life, spoke out against cyberbullying, which affected her personally as she was often the target of online abuse for her dichotomous public image. She expressed her hope that people could accept each other's differences and said, "there are so many unique types of people in this country with so much talent and I feel like they're wasting it by putting their energy into critiquing others like this online." Following her appearance on the JTBC2 variety program The Night of Hate Comments, Billboard K-Town's Jeff Benjamin expressed that Sulli's appearance on the show seemed to reflect her controversial lifestyle. He said that, "as the youngest and most outspoken host", she talked about many personal topics, including "her pregnancy rumors, family plans, dating preferences and more."

Sulli was an artist, with one of her drawings (captioned "Portrait") being the inspiration for IU's song "Red Queen" from her 2015 Chat-Shire album. Sulli was also the inspiration for IU's song "Peach".

== Discography ==
=== Single albums ===
List of single albums, showing selected details
| Title | Details |
|---|---|
| Goblin | Released: June 29, 2019; Label: SM; Formats: Digital download, streaming |

=== Singles ===
List of singles, with selected chart positions and sales
| Title | Year | Peak chart positions | | | Album |
| Title | Year | KOR | KOR Hot | US World | Album |
As lead artist
| "Goblin" (고블린) (Note: "Goblin" was digitally released as Sulli's debut single along two b-sides "On The Moon" and "Dorothy".) | 2019 | — | 96 | 14 | Goblin |
As featured artist
| "Dayfly" (하루살이) (Dean featuring Sulli & Rad Museum) | 2018 | 37 | — | — | Non-album single |
"—" denotes releases that did not chart or were not released in that region.

=== Other guest appearances ===
List of other guest appearances
| Title | Year | Artist(s) | Album |
|---|---|---|---|
| "The Way an Idol Breaks Up" (아이돌이 헤어지는 방법) | 2011 | Kim Hee-chul featuring Sulli | Super Show 3 - The 3rd Asia Tour Concert Album |

=== Composition credits ===
All song credits are adapted from the Korea Music Copyright Association's database unless stated otherwise.

List of songs, showing year released, artist name, and name of the album
| Title | Year | Artist | Album | Composer | Lyricist |
|---|---|---|---|---|---|
| "Goblin" (고블린) | 2019 | Sulli | Goblin | Yes | Yes |
| "On the Moon" (온더문) | 2019 | Sulli | Goblin | Yes | Yes |
| "Dorothy" (도로시) | 2019 | Sulli | Goblin | Yes | Yes |

== Filmography ==
=== Film ===
| Year | Title | Role | Notes | Ref. |
|---|---|---|---|---|
| 2006 | Vacation | Young Jin-joo | Part 4: Eternal | |
| 2007 | Punch Lady | Gwak Chun-sim | | |
| 2008 | BABO | Young Ji-ho | | |
| 2010 | A Turtle's Tale: Sammy's Adventures | Shelly (voice) | Korean dub | |
| 2012 | I Am | Herself | Documentary of SM Town Live '10 World Tour at Madison Square Garden | |
| 2012 | SM Town Live in Tokyo Special Edition in 3D | Herself | Documentary of SM Town Live World Tour III at Tokyo | |
| 2014 | The Pirates | Heuk-myo | | |
| 2014 | Fashion King | Kwak Eun-jin | | |
| 2017 | Real | Song Yoo-hwa | | |
| 2023 | Dear Jinri | Herself | Posthumous documentary film | |

=== Television series ===
| Year | Title | Role | Notes | Ref. |
|---|---|---|---|---|
| 2005 | Drama City: "Goblins Are Alive" | Herself | | |
| 2005 | Ballad of Seodong | Young Princess Seonhwa of Silla | | |
| 2005 | Love Needs a Miracle | Na Sun-ju | Cameo | |
| 2006 | Drama City: "The Flower Girl is Here" | Noh Yu-ran | | |
| 2010 | Oh! My Lady | Runway model | Cameo (Episode 1) | |
| 2012 | To the Beautiful You | Goo Jae-hee | Korean version of Hana Kimi | |
| 2019 | Hotel del Luna | Jung Ji-eun | Cameo (Episode 10) | |

=== Web series ===
| Year | Title | Role | Notes | Ref. |
|---|---|---|---|---|
| 2023 | Persona: Sulli | Herself | 2 episodes, including Dear Jinri | |

=== Television shows ===
| Year | Title | Role | Ref. |
|---|---|---|---|
| 2010–2011 | Inkigayo | Host | |
| 2011 | Welcome to the Show | Fictional version of herself | |
| 2011 | TV Animal Farm | Special MC | |
| 2018 | Jin Ri's Market | Lead role | |
| 2019 | The Night of Hate Comments | MC | |

== Awards and nominations ==
Name of the award ceremony, year presented, category, nominee of the award, and the result of the nomination
| Award ceremony | Year | Category | Nominee / Work | Result | Ref. |
|---|---|---|---|---|---|
| Baeksang Arts Awards | 2013 | Most Popular Actress (Television) | To the Beautiful You | Nominated | |
| Baeksang Arts Awards | 2015 | Most Popular Actress (Film) | Fashion King | Nominated | |
| Mnet 20's Choice Awards | 2012 | 20's Upcoming 20's | Sulli | Nominated | |
| SBS Drama Awards | 2012 | New Star Award | To the Beautiful You | Won | |
| SBS Drama Awards | 2012 | Netizen Popularity Award | To the Beautiful You | Nominated | |

== See also ==
- Suicide in South Korea
