= Dear Jinri =

2023 South Korean documentary film

- Commercial release poster
- Hangul: 진리에게
- Lit.: To the truth
- RR: Jinriege
- MR: Chilliege
- Directed by: Jung Yoon-suk
- Written by: Jung Yoon-suk
- Produced by: Ko Yoo-hee
- Starring: Choi Jin-ri
- Cinematography: Kim Duk-joon
- Edited by: Jung Yoon-suk
- Music by: Cho Kwang-ho
- Production company: Mystic Story
- Distributed by: Netflix
- Release dates: October 7, 2023 (BIFF); November 13, 2023 (Netflix)
- Running time: 101 minutes
- Country: South Korea
- Language: Korean

Dear Jinri (Korean: 진리에게; lit. 'To the truth') is a 2023 South Korean documentary film directed by Jung Yoon-suk. The film is built around the final interview of Choi Jin-ri, better known as K-pop star Sulli, and was filmed shortly before her death in 2019. The film premiered at the 28th Busan International Film Festival on October 7, 2023, and was released commercially by Netflix on November 13. It serves as the second episode of Persona: Sulli. Choi was filming season two of Persona at the time of her death.

Despite initial concerns about the possibility of the film's release being exploitative or disrespectful, Dear Jinri was received positively by audiences, who felt it respectfully commemorated and remembered Choi. Some critics felt that the film was too vague about Choi's death and backstory, instead relying on the audience already being familiar with the subject matter. The film contains elements of L. Frank Baum's The Wonderful Wizard of Oz, used as a framing device on intertitles, as a tribute to "Dorothy", the name of Choi's final song.

== Background ==
Choi Jin-ri, better known as Sulli, began her career in the entertainment industry as a child actress in the 2005 drama series Ballad of Seodong. In 2009, at the age of 15, Choi debuted in the SM Entertainment girl group f(x). In 2014, Choi took a hiatus from the group for mental and physical health reasons after becoming the subject of malicious rumors. She withdrew from the group entirely in 2015 and decided to focus on her acting career. In June 2019, Choi returned to music and released her debut single album, Goblin.

On August 31, 2019, it was announced that Choi would star in season two of Netflix's Persona anthology series, with filming scheduled to start later that year. In mid-October 2019, Choi committed suicide by hanging, widely attributed by the media to depression caused by cyberbullying. At the time of her death, she had completed one of five planned episodes of Persona. Mystic Story, the company producing the series, confirmed to OSEN on October 23 that production was suspended.

== Synopsis ==
Dear Jinri is based on Choi's final project, the Netflix series Persona that was in production at the time of her death. The core of the film is a lengthy interview with director Jung Yoon-suk, interweaved with personal writings, artwork, video diaries, and archival clips. In the interview, Choi reflects on the challenges of fame, societal expectations, and her commitment to individuality and mental health advocacy.

The film opens by stating in the opening credits that the interview was recorded "shortly before her passing", the only reference made to Choi's October 2019 suicide. Choi enters the interview set, wearing a plain white shirt and jeans. "Hello, I'm Choi Jin-ri," she says. Choi discusses her childhood and battles with body image in an industry intensely focused on appearance, saying: "Since you are born as a pretty woman, you don't have to know anything," before adding, "it's obnoxious to say your life was hard because you are a pretty woman."

Choi also discusses the pressures of being a K-pop star, saying that she was told that her goal was to be "the highest quality product" and likens her experience to the protagonist of Luc Besson's La Femme Nikita (1990), a film that depicts a woman who is trained to become an assassin and is isolated from the outside world. People "couldn't recognize that we were human beings," she remarks.

Other topics touched on were feminism in socially conservative South Korea. Choi says that she "rooted for women who spoke out" even if their views were contrary to hers, and Choi's decision to drop a lawsuit and grant forgiveness to one of the perpetrators of cyberbullying against her.

Dear Jinri employs elements of L. Frank Baum's The Wonderful Wizard of Oz as a framing device, making reference to "Dorothy", the final song on Choi's album, Goblin. The film ends with "Dorothy" being played over scenery of clouds while the song's lyrics appear on-screen.

== Production ==
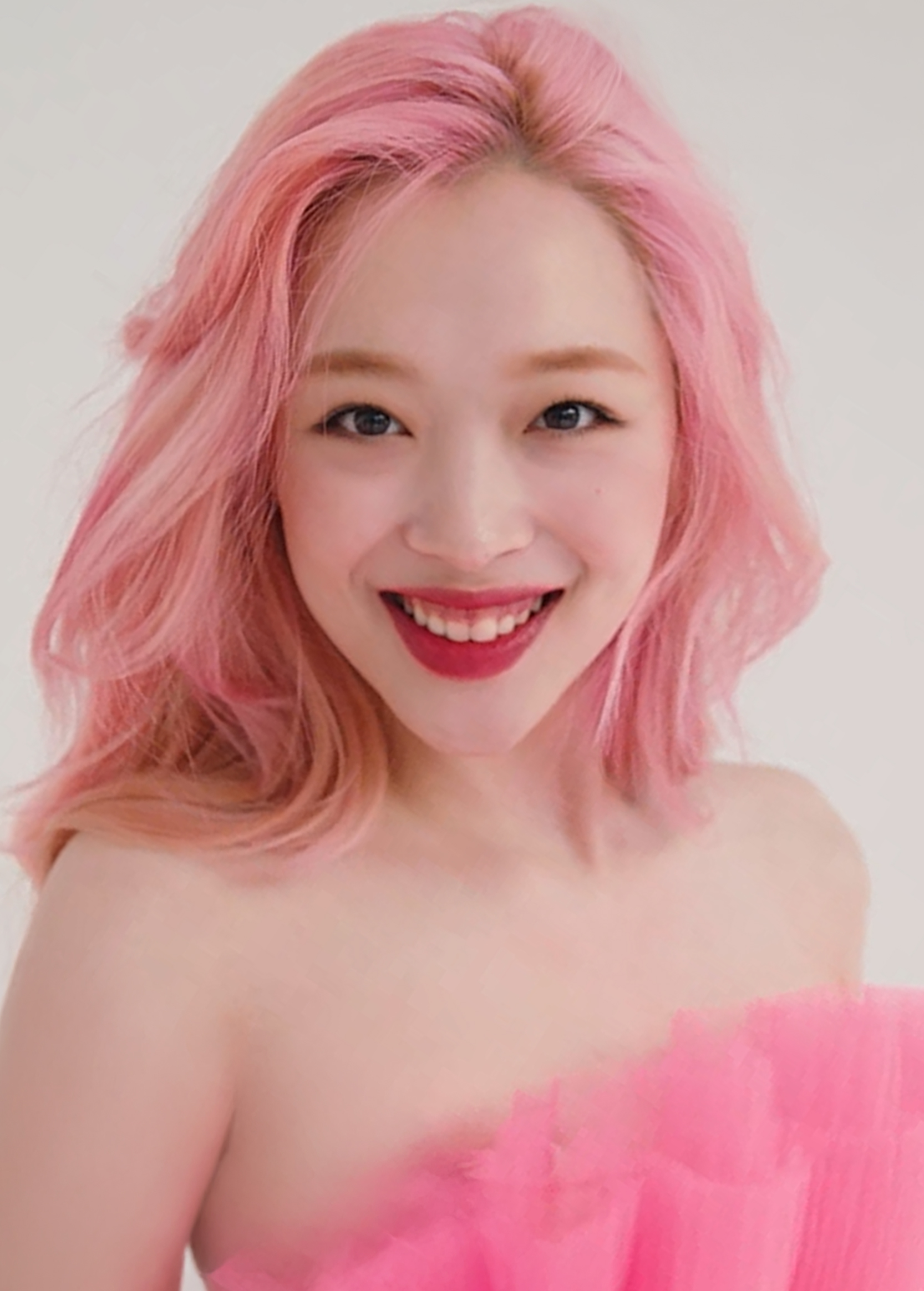
Choi Jin-ri, better known as K-pop star Sulli, in a photoshoot for Marie Claire Korea, July 2019

The interview for Dear Jinri was shot shortly before Choi's death in October 2019. The interview was originally planned to be released as part of Netflix's Persona series, but was canceled after Choi's death.

The film's footage sat unused until 2023 when director Jung Yoon-suk decided to make it into a documentary. Jung worked closely with a psychologist and human rights lawyers to review the material used in the film and to ensure it was respectful to Choi's memory. Speaking at the film's premiere at the Busan International Film Festival on October 7, Jung said: "To protect the deceased's honor and bereaved family, I received advice from two female human rights lawyers from the editing stage and verified every scene one by one. I also discussed with a psychiatrist about how the main character's (Choi's) words should be conveyed to the audience."

Jung also said that as part of his research for the film he read several articles and interviews from Choi's fourteen-year entertainment career, saying: "I thought those articles were the deceased's heirlooms."

== Release ==
The first news of the film's release came on May 20, 2023, when a short clip of the film circulated on Twitter claiming to cite its source as Netflix Brazil. At the time, Netflix did not confirm any information about the film or its potential release. At the time, some expressed concerns over the film's release, citing that it may pose emotional issues to other K-pop artists and cause fans to relive the trauma of her 2019 suicide. Two days later, a Netflix spokesperson confirmed that discussion was underway on whether to release the film, along with when the potential release would occur. Further speculation of the film's release came in June, when the film passed through its mandatory age certification by the Korea Media Rating Board.

On September 6, production company Mystic Story announced that Dear Jinri would premiere at the 28th Busan International Film Festival, scheduled to take place between October 4 and 13. At the same time, a trailer for the film was released, showing photographs of Choi's childhood, before she sits down for the interview and introduces herself. At the time, a commercial release of the film was not confirmed. Dear Jinri premiered on October 7 as part of the "Wide Angle – Documentary Showcase" section of the festival. The film, for which all three screenings sold out immediately upon the opening of ticket sales, was "the most talked-about film" at the festival.

The film's commercial release was announced by Mystic Story on October 26, who confirmed that the film would be released worldwide by Netflix as the second episode of the Persona: Sulli series on November 13.

== Reception ==
Despite concerns before its release about the possibility of the film's subject matter being sensationalized exploitative, Dear Jinri was positively received by audiences on its release, who felt it respectfully commemorated and remembered Choi.

In a review for the South China Morning Post, film critic James Marsh gave the film three out of five stars and opined that the film "tip-toed" around Choi's suicide and her history with cyberbullying, calling it "frustrating" that the filmmaker assumed that the audience was already familiar with Choi and her backstory. Regarding Choi's interview, he remarked that the film made it "painfully clear that (Choi) is a victim of her own success, an object of beauty thrust into the limelight by an industry that subsequently failed to adequately protect her from the attention it engendered" and that the result was "heartbreaking, but perhaps not in the way the filmmaker intended." Writing for United Press International, Thomas Maresca felt that the film was a "provocative portrait" of Choi, while again noting that the film "avoids filling in much narrative context, assuming a familiarity with Choi's work and real-world incidents she references." He opined that the Jung leaned into including portions that normally would have been edited out, such as pauses, sighs, and faltering starts, but noted this often "leads to answers that are remarkably honest and insightful, revealing truths about an industry in which her goal was to become 'the highest quality product'."

Claire Lee, writing for Agence France-Presse, wrote that "the interview is punctuated by frequent pauses as the camera lingers silently on its subject, the pain and sorrow palpable on her face." Lee noted that frequent sobs could be heard from the audience throughout its screening at the Busan International Film Festival. In summing up the film, she wrote that "the film paints a portrait of a contemplative, resilient figure who, in the ways she could, resisted the pressure to conform, striving instead to forge her own understanding of the world and her place in it."
