= List of Hana-Kimi chapters =

The cover of Hana-Kimi volume 8 as released by Viz Media on October 11, 2005, in North America.

Hana-Kimi or known originally as Hanazakari no Kimitachi e (花ざかりの君たちへ?, For You in Full Blossom) in Japan, is a shōjo manga series written and illustrated by Hisaya Nakajo. The series was first serialized in the 20th issue of Hakusensha's semi-monthly shōjo manga magazine, Hana to Yume in 1996. Its serialization continued where the series ended with 23 tankōbon volumes with 144 chapters without including 5 special chapters that were published during the series' serialization and another 5 special chapters that were published after the series ended.

The series' 23 volumes were first published under the Hana to Yume Comics. It was then later re-published into 12 volumes of aizōban under the Hana to Yume Comics Special imprint. Each volume featured a new cover illustration and design as well as colored pages.

Hana-Kimi was also published in English by Viz Media. The English release was previously only limited to Waldenbooks from February to May 2004. It was then made available to other retail stores after May that year. The English title originated from a fan abbreviation of the original Japanese title as the official U.S. translation ends the title with a he instead of e.

== Volume list ==
No.	Original release date	Original ISBN	English release date	English ISBN
1	April 18, 1997	978-4-592-11602-8	September 7, 2004	978-1-59116-329-9
Chapters 1-4; Extra: "The Cage of Summer"
Mizuki Ashiya travels to Japan and enrolls in an all-boys boarding school, Osaka High, to see her idol, Izumi Sano, high jump. During a soccer match with Shuichi Nakatsu, she is knocked unconscious and carried by Sano when he realizes she is a girl. The school doctor, Hokuto Umeda, also learns about her gender and after learning about her goals and resolve, keeps quiet about her secret. Later, Sano's junior high manager from the high jump club attempts to persuade him to retake the sport. Soon after, Mizuki and Sano argue about his reluctance to retake the sport; Sano eventually accepts Mizuki as a support and decides to try high jumping again.
2	August 19, 1997	978-4-592-12852-6	November 3, 2004	978-1-59116-398-5
Chapters 5-10
Sano is provoked by high jumper Makoto Kagurazaka to win an upcoming high jump competition. When Sano becomes drunk, he kisses Mizuki which causes her to distance herself for a while. Mizuki is later the target of a bullying by Senri Nakao who became envious after seeing her with Minami Nanba. Mizuki is able to amend her relationship with him soon after. Next, Mizuki's brother, Shizuki, travels to Japan and after learning she is attending an all-boys school, threatens to take her back to Japan if Sano fails at the competition. After seeing her relationship with Sano and his jump at the competition, Shizuki decides to let Mizuki stay in Japan.
3	January 19, 1998	978-4-592-12853-3	January 11, 2005	978-1-59116-399-2
Chapters 11-16
Due to construction at the school, students are forced to return home for the summer. Mizuki, Sano, and Nakatsu instead decide to work at the Hayama chalet, a chalet owned by the Umeda family. There, they find Kagurazaka and his siblings who are vacationing at the inn. While working there, Io Nanba discovers Mizuki's gender and decides to support her in keeping her secret. Later, an employee at the chalet drives Mizuki out for some tasks and attempts to rape her on the way. Sano saves her but the two fall into a ravine shortly after. Nakatsu is able to find them and the three return to school after the summer ends.
4	May 19, 1998	978-4-592-12854-0	February 16, 2005	978-1-59116-458-6
Chapters 17-20
The school festival begins and the different dorms compete for a prize. The first contest consists of athletic activities. An unknown culprit attempts to injure Mizuki during the contest but fails when Sano and Nakatsu saves her. The second contest consists of a beauty pageant where the students dress as females. Nakatsu overhears the culprits plan to injure Mizuki to prevent her from participating in the race at the end. At the same time, the voting for the beauty pageant begins.
5	September 17, 1998	978-4-592-12855-7	April 5, 2005	978-1-59116-497-5
Chapters 21-25; Bonus chapter
Mizuki is kidnapped by the opposing team who prepare to strip her but are foiled by Sano and Nakatsu. For the finale race, Mizuki is able to help her dorm become the winners of the school festival. Afterwards, Nakatsu is conflicted by his attraction towards Mizuki and a confession he received from a girl. While Mizuki is asleep, he approaches to kiss her.
6	November 19, 1998	978-4-592-12856-4	June 7, 2005	978-1-59116-498-2
Chapters 26-30; Bonus chapter
Nakatsu decides his attraction to Mizuki is unhealthy and dates the girl he received a confession from. Realizing his feelings still remain, he decides to break up with the girl and confess to Mizuki. Afterwards, Mizuki's school is planning a trip to Hokkaido. Mizuki's friend from America, Julia, accompanies her to go shopping before the trip. At the end of the trip, Julia decides to pretend to be Mizuki's girlfriend to watch Sano's reaction.
7	February 19, 1999	978-4-592-12857-1	August 16, 2005	978-1-59116-499-9
Chapters 31-36
Julia begins to suspect Sano knows Mizuki is a girl. During the trip to Hokkaido Julia confirms hers suspicions. While there, Sano sees into his younger brother, Shin, in a street fight. Shin berates Sano for running away from home before leaving. Sano reveals he ran away since his mother died in a car accident while driven by his father. His father, since then, became extremely strict and forced Sano and Shin into high jumping.
8	May 19, 1999	978-4-592-12858-8	October 11, 2005	978-1-4215-0007-2
Chapters 37-42
Returning to their daily life, Julia decides to directly confront Sano about Mizuki's gender. After Sano confesses he knows she is a girl since the beginning and had been keeping it a secret. Julia, relieved that Mizuki's secret is protected by Sano, returns to America. Later, Sano, Nakatsu, and Nanba are featured on a magazine causing them to become popular with girls. The three are later scouted by Akiha Hara who asks them to become models. While undecided in their decision, a series of events cause Nakatsu to become accused of cheating on a test.
9	August 19, 1999	978-4-592-12859-5	December 20, 2005	978-1-4215-0138-3
Chapters 43-48
The substitute principal aggressively tries to have Nakatsu sign a confession or be forced off the soccer team. However, Mizuki and friends learn that the principal is using Nakatsu as an example to the other students due to a traumatic past. The students rally and are able to convince the principal to overcome his past and forgive Nakatsu. Later, Hara invites Mizuki and her friends to his gallery to model for some pictures.
10	November 19, 1999	978-4-592-12860-1	February 21, 2006	978-1-4215-0264-9
Chapters 49-55
The photo shoot confirms Hara's theory that Mizuki is a girl. While Mizuki, Nakatsu, and Nanba agree to being models, Sano refuses. Hara decides to use Mizuki as bait in order to have Sano agree to be a model as he believes free will is necessary to make his photos look good. The four become models for a brand of clothing which ends in success. Later, Mizuki, Sano, Nakatsu, Hokuto, and their psychic classmate Taiki Kayashima are invited to clean a villa. There, a spirit calls for Mizuki.
11	March 17, 2000	978-4-592-17661-9	April 18, 2006	978-1-4215-0394-3
Chapters 56-61
The group discovers the boy spirit is longing for his lover that looks exactly like Mizuki. Eventually, the lover's spirit returns to the villa to escort the boy to the afterlife. Next, Osaka High is set to have a couple's dance with St. Blossoms academy, an all girls school. To make up for the shortage of girls, students from Osaka High are selected to cross dress for the ball; Mizuki volunteers in return for money to buy Sano a birthday present. Mizuki is selected to be Nakatsu's partner for the dance while Sano is paired with Rio Umeda, Hokuto's sister and Mizuki's friend. To prepare for the dance, Mizuki and friends are trained by Rio.
12	August 18, 2000	978-4-592-17662-6	June 20, 2006	978-1-4215-0542-8
Chapters 62-67
On the day of the dance, Nakatsu faints from excitement and Rio arranges Mizuki to dance with Sano where the two receive the best couples award; a myth explains those who receive that award will be together forever. Mizuki returns to America for the New Years where she spends the time with her family and Gilbert, a male friend from the past. Coincidentally, she runs into Sano and Nakatsu who were sent to a nearby university for training and the two are invited to stay over at Mizuki's. Gilbert learns about Mizuki's situation and after the holidays, provokes Sano by declaring he was Mizuki's first kiss.
13	November 17, 2000	978-4-592-17663-3	August 15, 2006	978-1-4215-0543-5
Chapters 68-73
After returning to Japan, Mizuki works at Hara's studio for extra money where she meets the model Alex. A series of events cause Mizuki to become interested in Alex's purpose of being in Japan. She learns from Alex that he is searching for a friend whom he grew up at the orphanage with. Unable to find him, Alex returns to America, for the time being. Later, the siblings of Masao Himejima travel to Osaka High and Kayashima's first meeting with Nakatsu is revealed.
14	February 19, 2001	978-4-592-17664-0	October 17, 2006	978-1-4215-0544-2
Chapters 74-79
A dorm's plumbing needs to be replaced causing students to share rooms with those who need it. Mizuki and Sano share with Shōtarō Kadoma who almost discovers Mizuki's gender by accident. Later, Hokuto reminisces about his past love while on the way to meet with that person.
15	June 19, 2001	978-4-592-17665-7	December 19, 2006	978-1-4215-0545-9
Chapters 80-85
Nakatsu confronts Sano about his feelings towards Mizuki. Realizing they both like her, Nakatsu becomes conflicted with his feelings of love towards Mizuki and friendship with Sano. After coming up with a conclusion, he tells Sano they should remain friends even if they are rivals of love.
16	October 19, 2001	978-4-592-17262-8	February 20, 2007	978-1-4215-0991-4
Chapters 86-91
A friendly exhibition match between high jumpers is scheduled and Sano, Shin, and Kagurazaka prepare for it. Sano and Shin attempt to make amends after five years apart and are initially successful until Sano argues with Shin after learning he is being coached by their father.
17	March 19, 2002	978-4-592-17263-5	April 17, 2007	978-1-4215-0992-1
Chapters 92-97
Mizuki attempts to amend the relationship between the two brothers. Shin reveals that, unlike before, he is training in high jumping on his own free will and not their father's; this revelation quells Sano's anger. Later, Sano's and Shin's father make the judges turn the exhibition match into an official contest, angering Shin who feels he can not lose to his father's expectations. Mizuki later meets Sano's father who regrets his relationship with Sano. Shin reveals their father's drunk driving caused their mother's death and feud Sano's hatred. When Sano shouts down to Mizuki who attempts to calm him down, Nakatsu comforts her and urges her to leave Sano.
18	July 19, 2002	978-4-592-17264-2	June 19, 2007	978-1-4215-0993-8
Chapters 98-104
Mizuki rejects Nakatsu's offer and leaves him heart broken. The high jump competition takes completes off-screen and Sano returns to his dorm. He learns his father fainted and is in the hospital and there, makes amends between the two of them. Sano then views the results for the high jump and sees that he, Shin, and Kagurazaka made it into the next round.
19	November 19, 2002	978-4-592-17265-9	August 21, 2007	978-1-4215-0994-5
Chapters 105-111
Sano and Kagurazaka make it into the finals where Sano is declared the winner. Before Sano's family returns to Hokkaido, Shin tells Mizuki he will confess to her when he beats Sano in high jumping. Next the students are asked to choose a university and their major which causes Mizuki anxiety. She realizes she can not maintain her identity as a boy her whole life and resolves to returning home and never seeing Sano again after graduating. Later, Nakatsu's mother visits him and tells him to give her a final answer three days from then.
20	April 18, 2003	978-4-592-17266-6	October 16, 2007	978-1-4215-0995-2
Chapters 112-119
Nakatsu reveals his mother is making him decide whether to pursue his dreams of being a professional soccer player or to return home and take over the family business. Nakatsu decides to pursue soccer resulting in an argument with his mother. Nakatsu's mother reveals to Mizuki she is testing his resolve and will welcome her son home whether he succeeds or not. On Valentine's day, Nakao confesses to Nanba and is turned down. Mizuki gives Sano chocolate where at that moment, Sano meets the owner Yuujiro, his dog. After a tense moment, Yuujiro decides to remain with Sano and Sano and Mizuki return to school holding hands.
21	October 17, 2003	978-4-592-17267-3	December 18, 2007	978-1-4215-0996-9
Chapters 120-129
The next day, Mizuki and friends go bowling where Sano confesses to her. Unable to discern the confession, Sano does an even more direct confession and Mizuki reveals she shares the same feelings but is conflicted since she thinks Sano believes she is a male. Mizuki is spotted changing and is later confronted by Nanba.
22	May 19, 2004	978-4-592-17877-4	February 19, 2008	978-1-4215-1534-2
Chapters 130-135
Mizuki confesses her gender to Nanba and the dorm heads before Sano barges into the meeting. Sano reveals he also knows and the four decides to keep quiet about it and return to their daily lives. The dorm head, Megumi Tennoji, tells his girlfriend which results in the rumor that a girl is enrolled in Osaka High.
23	November 19, 2004	978-4-592-17878-1	April 15, 2008	978-1-4215-1721-6
Chapters 136-144; "Hana Kimi Special Ending"
Ignoring the rumors, Mizuki collaborates with her friends to help set up the graduation event for the seniors. While working, Mizuki falls and is knocked unconscious. While Nakatsu tries to relieve her breathing by unbuttoning her shirt, her gender is discovered by him and on-lookers and information is spread around the school. Mizuki's classmates protect her from the student's sexual harassment and when Nanba is chided by the school, Mizuki decides to resign and return to America. A year later, she is reunited with Sano who is enrolling in a nearby university to be with her. Two years afterwards, the two return to Japan to attend a classmates wedding where they learn what their friends are up to after graduation. After the wedding, Sano tells Mizuki he will propose after his graduation.
