= Mario Adrion =

German-American comedian (born 1994)

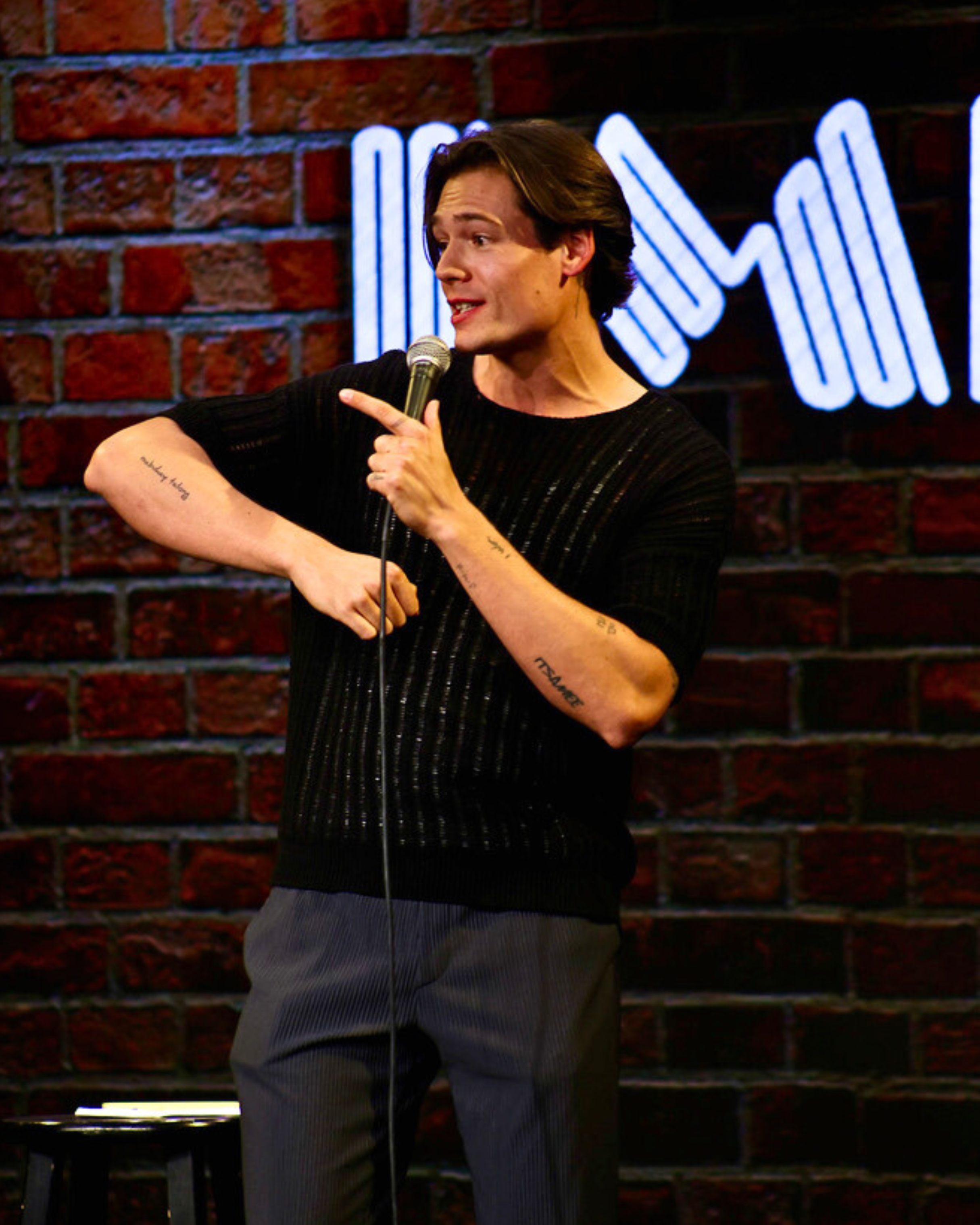
- Adrion in 2023
- Born: Mario Leon Adrion; 21 January 1994 (age 32); Alpirsbach, Baden-Württemberg, Germany
- Occupations: Social media personality; actor; model; comedian
- Years active: 2012–present

YouTube information
- Channel: Mario Adrion
- Genres: Vlog; Comedy
- Subscribers: 945 thousand
- Views: 175 million
- Last updated: July 12, 2026
- Modeling information
- Height: 1.88 m (6 ft 2 in)
- Hair color: Brown
- Eye color: Brown

Comedy career
- Medium: Stand-up; film; television; content creation
- Genres: Satirical comedy, observational comedy, character comedy, comedy of mannerisms
- Subjects: Everyday life, self-deprecation, parenting, current events, pop culture, race relations, relationships
- Website: marioadrion.com

Mario Leon Adrion (born 21 January 1994) is a German-American comedian, YouTuber, and former fashion model, who has appeared in Vogue magazine, and on ABC, Pro7 as well as Jimmy Kimmel Live! He is best known for his comedy content on YouTube, international stand-up tours and his catwalk with Katy Perry on American Idol.

== Early life ==
Adrion was born in Alpirsbach in the Black Forest, Germany. His family lineage is rooted in lumbering. His parents got divorced when he was five. At the age of 15, he went to Peru for a year as part of a student exchange. He moved to the United States when he was 18 while he was an undergraduate university student in Berlin.

== Career ==
=== Modeling ===
Adrion started his modeling career at age 18 after he was scouted via Facebook to partake in the New York Fashion Week. He moved to Harlem, New York and later started traveling full time between New York, Italy and Asia represented by different agencies including ONE Management, Louisa Models and Wilhelmina agency. As a model, he featured for fashion brands including Tommy Hilfiger, Calvin Klein, and Gucci. He also modelled for Hudson Jeans, Banana Republic, Puma, Bloomingdale's, amongst others, and walked the runways of the New York and Milan Fashion Weeks. He appeared on Vogue, Jimmy Kimmel Live, Vanity Teen and ABC.

In 2019, he was one of the judges on season 14 of Germany's Next Topmodel with Heidi Klum.

=== YouTube ===
He later switched careers, moving on from modelling and citing sexual harassments behind his decision to follow a new career path. On his already established YouTube channel, he transitioned into vlogging, which entailed making comedy content and story telling; two forms of art he already had a true passion for from a young age. He did this as a way of documenting his life as a male model while, at the same time, making fun of the fashion industry and sharing his life experience.

He released two comedy songs titled Brojob, featuring singer J Rand, and American Idol.

=== Comedy ===
In 2020, Adrion decided to move to Los Angeles, making videos with his best friends Travis Bryant, Jeff Kasser, and Jiaoying Summers. He went to his first comedy open mic in 2020. He started training in Improv at the Second City Theatre in Hollywood and proceeded to make comedy appearances at comedy club venues including The Stand, The Hollywood Improv, and Laugh Factory. In 2021, he participated in American Idol, wearing a Speedo and catwalking alongside Katy Perry. He has a podcast called UNCENSORED with Mario Adrion, and has regularly collaborated with comedians and influencers Godfrey, Jiaoying Summers, and Peet Montzingo.

== Personal life ==
At the age of 21, whilst working in Asia on a modelling assignment, Adrion was raped by a man who was influential in the fashion world. In a YouTube video addressing the incident, he said that he took a small amount of ketamine, and describes quickly feeling 'out of control' and unable to coordinate his movements.

In September 2023, while performing stand-up comedy in Chicago, Adrion proposed to his girlfriend, Veta, live on stage in her hometown of Chicago in front of her family and friends. They married in March 2024. They are expecting their first child in November 2026.

== Filmography ==
=== Television ===
Year	Title	Role
2019	Persona	Eun's Foreign Friend
2019	Germany's Next Topmodel (season 14)	Judge
2021	American Idol	Himself

=== Films ===
Year	Title	Role	Notes
2016	The Escape	Tom	Short film
2018	Shit List	Dirk	Drama; Comedy
