= Baby (Yoasobi song) =

Single by Yoasobi

from the EP The Book For,
- Language: Japanese
- A-side: "Adrena"
- Released: January 11, 2026
- Length: 3:50
- Label: Echoes; Sony Japan
- Songwriter: Ayase
- Producer: Ayase

Yoasobi singles chronology
"Adrena" (2026)	"Baby" (2026)	"Orion" (2026)

Music video
- "Baby" on YouTube; English version on YouTube

"Baby" is a song by Japanese duo Yoasobi from their fourth EP, The Book For, (2026). It was released as a single through Echoes and Sony Music Entertainment Japan on January 11, 2026. Based on Yasuko Aoki's short story My Dear......, the song serves as an ending theme for the 2026 anime series Hana-Kimi.

== Background and release ==
An anime adaptation of the manga series Hana-Kimi was first announced in May 2024 by Aniplex. A year later, on September 14, 2025, the company revealed that Yoasobi would perform both opening and ending themes for the anime series, which is set to premiere in January 2026. The themes' titles and snippets—opening theme "Adrena" and ending theme "Baby"—were unveiled through the anime's promotional video, uploaded on November 8.

On January 6, following the premiere of the first episode, the duo announced the release date of "Baby" as January 11, along with its cover artwork, designed by Kisuke Ōta, featuring the protagonist Mizuki Ashiya's face. The limited double A-side CD single, alongside "Adrena", was released on March 4, additionally containing the English, "anime edit", and instrumental versions of both songs. The English version was included on the duo's English-language EP E-Side 4 (2026), while the original version on the duo's fourth Japanese-language EP, The Book For, (2026).

== Composition and lyrics ==
Lyrically, "Baby" expresses an emotional conflict between pure, straightforward, yet unspeakable love for a person. Yasuko Aoki of Studio Monado wrote a short story for the song, titled My Dear......, published on January 10, 2026. It depicts the protagonist Mizuki's bittersweet love with her crush Izumi Sano as she lives in the United States; her friend Julia Maxwell always encourages her. Writing for Rockin'On Japan, Tomohiro Ogawa described the song's lyrics a reminiscence of the duo's song "Ano Yume o Nazotte".

== Music video ==
An accompanying music video for "Baby" premiered on January 11, 2026, the same day as the release of the single. Described as "delicate and warm," the animated visual is a story that follows the song's basis, My Dear......; Mizuki's life in the United States and her bittersweet love with Izumi. The English version's music video was uploaded on April 25.

== Track listing ==
- Digital download and streaming
1. "Baby" – 3:50
- CD single
1. "Adrena" (アドレナ) – 3:07
2. "Baby" – 3:52
3. "Adrena" (English version) – 3:07
4. "Baby" (English version) – 3:52
5. "Adrena" (anime edit) – 1:30
6. "Baby" (anime edit) – 1:28
7. "Adrena" (instrumental) – 3:07
8. "Baby" (instrumental) – 3:52

== Credits and personnel ==
- Ayase – songwriting, arrangement, instruments
- Ikura – vocals
- Konnie Aoki – lyrics (English version), lyrical and vocal recording direction (English version)
- BFNK – English version lyrical and vocal recording direction
- Rockwell – acoustic guitar
- Sota Morimitsu – bass
- Yasuko Aoki (Studio Monado) – based story writer
- Manami Sugishita – vocal recording
- Takayuki Saitō – vocal recording
- Kunio Nishikawara – vocal recording (English version)
- Masahiko Fukui – mixing
- Hidekazu Sakai – mastering

== Charts ==
Chart performance for "Baby"
Chart (2026)	Peak position
Japan (Oricon) with "Adrena"	19
Japan Anime Singles (Oricon) (with "Adrena")	9
Japan Digital Singles (Oricon)	6
Japan Hot 100 (Billboard)	58
Japan Hot Animation (Billboard Japan)	19

== Release history ==
Release dates and formats for "Baby"
Region	Date	Format	Version	Label	Ref.
Various	January 11, 2026	Digital download; streaming	Original	Echoes; Sony Japan	
Japan	March 4, 2026	CD	Limited (with "Adrena")	Echoes; Sony Japan	
