= Kian84 =

South Korean manhwaga

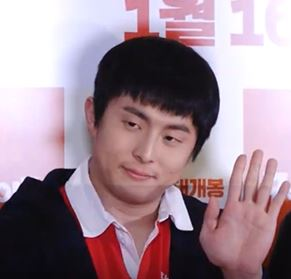
- Kian84 in 2018
- Born: Kim Hee-min; October 22, 1984 (age 41); Yeoju, Gyeonggi Province, South Korea
- Other name: 기안84
- Education: Suwon University
- Occupation: Comic Creator
- Years active: 2008-present
- Agent: AOMG
- Height: 180 cm (5 ft 11 in)
- Awards: 2023 MBC 방송 연예대상

Korean name
- Hangul: 김희민
- RR: Gim Huimin
- MR: Kim Hŭimin

Pen name
- Hangul: 기안84
- RR: Gian84
- MR: Kian84

Kim Hee-min (Korean: 김희민; born October 22, 1984), better known by his pen name Kian84 (기안84), is a South Korean manhwaga and entertainer. He is best known for writing the webtoon Fashion King and as a member of Korean variety show I Live Alone.

== Personal life ==
On March 8, 2022, it was confirmed that Kian will hold His first solo exhibition, titled 1st Solo Exhibition (subtitle: Full所有), which will run from March 25, 2022 to April 5, 2022.

In April 2023, Kian84 signed with AOMG.

=== Philanthropy ===
On May 24, 2022, he donated 87 million won to the Children's Orphanage. It also revealed the details of the donations for 15 youths studying the arts.

== Filmography ==
=== Television series ===
Year	Title	Role	Network	Ref.
2017	Last Minute Romance / Terms of Romance	Hwang Geum Son	jTBC/Naver TV	

=== Film ===
Year	Title	Role	Ref.
2014	Fashion King	Special appearance as Woo Ki-myung's bully friend	Link
2020	Hitman: Agent Jun	Special appearance as situation room NIS agent	Pic

=== Variety shows ===
Year	Title	Role	Notes
2016–present	I Live Alone	Cast Member	
2022	Around the World at Birth	Cast Member	
2022	Adventure by Accident	Cast Member	
2023	Adventure by Accident 2	Cast Member	
2023	Adventure by Accident 3	Cast Member	
2024	Music Adventure by Accident	Cast Member	
2025	Adventure by Accident 4	Cast Member	
2025	Extreme84	Cast Member	

=== Web shows ===
Year	Title	Role	Notes	Ref.
2023	Cartoon Rip	Cast Member		
2025	Kian's Bizarre B&B	Cast Member	with Jin and Ji Ye-eun	
2026	Kian's Bizzare B&B 2	Cast Member	with Lee Jun-ho, Kazuha, Kim Yeon-koung	

=== Music video appearances ===
Year	Title	Artist	Album	Ref.
2018	"My Star" (너란 별)	K.Will	The 4th Album Part.2 [想像; Mood Indigo]	video

== Awards and nominations ==
Year	Award	Category	Nominee / Work	Result	Ref.
2017	17th MBC Entertainment Awards	Rookie Award	I Live Alone	Nominated	
2017	17th MBC Entertainment Awards	Best Couple Award with Park Na-rae	I Live Alone	Won	
2018	18th MBC Entertainment Awards	Excellence Award	I Live Alone	Won	
2018	18th MBC Entertainment Awards	Best Couple Award with Park Na-rae	I Live Alone	Nominated	
2019	19th MBC Entertainment Awards	Top Excellence Award	I Live Alone	Nominated	
2019	19th MBC Entertainment Awards	Best Teamwork Award with Lee Si-eon, Sung Hoon, and Henry Lau	I Live Alone	Won	
2019	19th MBC Entertainment Awards	Best Couple Award with Henry Lau	I Live Alone	Won	
2022	2022 MBC Entertainment Awards	Multiplayer Award	I Live Alone	Won	
2023	59th Baeksang Arts Awards	Best Male Variety Performer	I Live Alone	Nominated	
2023	50th Korean Broadcasting Awards	Best Entertainer Award	I Live Alone and Adventure by Accident	Won	
2023	2023 MBC Entertainment Awards	Grand Prize (Daesang)	I Live Alone and Adventure by Accident	Won	
2023	2023 MBC Entertainment Awards	Entertainer of the Year	I Live Alone and Adventure by Accident	Won	
2023	2023 MBC Entertainment Awards	Best Couple Award with Pani Bottle and Dex	Adventure by Accident	Won	
2024	60th Baeksang Arts Awards	Best Male Variety Performer	Kian84	Nominated	
2026	62nd Baeksang Arts Awards	Best Male Variety Performer	Kian84	Won	
