= Goblin (single album) =

Single album by Sulli
- Released: June 29, 2019
- Genres: K-pop; new age; city pop
- Length: 11:29
- Languages: Korean; English
- Labels: SM; Dreamus
- Producers: Johan Gustafson; Simo; Joo Yeong-eun

Singles from Goblin
- 1. "Goblin" Released: June 29, 2019

Music video
- "Goblin" on YouTube

Goblin is the first and only single album by South Korean singer Sulli. The three track single album was released by SM Entertainment on June 29, 2019, three months prior to the singer's death that October. The album was released along with the lead single of the same name. A K-pop album with new age and city pop influences, Goblin contains self-written songs about topics such as dissociative identity disorder, the singer's dreams, and her hopes for the future.

== Background and release ==
Sulli debuted in the SM Entertainment girl group f(x) in 2009 with the single "La Cha Ta". In 2014, she took a hiatus from the group for mental health reasons after becoming the subject of malicious rumours, eventually withdrawing from the group entirely in 2015 to focus on her acting career. Sulli returned to the music industry in November 2018, collaborating with R&B singer Dean on his single "Dayfly".

Goblin, Sulli's debut single album, was announced by SM on June 17, simultaneously announcing the album's track listing and confirming that Sulli participated in writing lyrics for all three tracks. The album was released on June 29, 2019, simultaneously with the title track and its accompanying music video.

== Composition ==
Lyrics for all three tracks on Goblin were written by Sulli. "Goblin", the album's title track and lead single, is an "organic" pop song with "French flavour" with lyrics describing a person with dissociative identity disorder. The song's music video depicted the singer playing a character with the disorder. The second track, "On the Moon", is a city pop song about a fantasy character. "Dorothy", the album's final track, is a new-age inspired track about the feelings of venturing into dreams and "otherworldly" places. In the song, Sulli speaks about Dorothy through "jealousy, love, truth, splendor, cowardice and the desert and icebergs, metaphorically", and talks about her dreams of the future.

"Yes, [Dorothy] is about my dreams. In one town there's an elderly woman – I go there and we chat. In another town, I have a friend. I go there and we wander around until I drift further in, to find a rural village. I know the geographies of all the towns, but I can't go whenever I want. These dreams just happen and I realize, 'Oh, I've come back!'"

— Sulli speaking on the inspiration behind "Dorothy" at the "Peaches Go!blin" fan-meeting on the album's release day.

== Promotion ==
On the day of the album's release, Sulli held a fan-meeting concert titled "Sulli's Special Stage 'Peaches Go!blin'" at the SM Town Theater in Samseong-dong, Seoul. She also began hosting the JTBC variety show The Night of Hate Comments shortly before the album's release.

== Commercial reception ==
On its release, no songs from Goblin entered any major charts. After Sulli's death, "Goblin" entered Billboard's World Digital Song Sales chart at number fourteen for the chart dated October 26. The entrance became Sulli's highest ranking on the chart, previously peaking at number seventeen with her featured appearance on Dean's single "Dayfly". The song also entered the K-pop Hot 100 at number 96 for the chart issued October 19.

== Track listing ==
All lyrics are written by Sulli and Jibin.

Goblin track listing
No.	Title	Music	Arrangement	Length
1.	"Goblin"	Johan Gustafson; Cazzi Opeia	Gustafson	3:13
2.	"On the Moon"	Simo; Jung Min-kyu	Simo; Joo Yeong-eun	4:15
3.	"Dorothy"	Simo; Jung	Simo; Joo	4:00
Total length:				11:29

== Charts ==
Chart performance for "Goblin"
Chart (2019)	Peak position
South Korea (K-pop Hot 100)	96
US World Digital Song Sales (Billboard)	14

== Release history ==
Release history for Goblin
Region	Date	Format	Label
Various	June 29, 2019	Digital download; streaming	SM; Dreamus
