= Adrena =

Single by Yoasobi

from the EP The Book For,
- Language: Japanese; English
- A-side: "Baby"
- Released: January 4, 2026
- Genre: Pop
- Length: 3:05
- Label: Echoes; Sony Japan
- Songwriter: Ayase
- Producer: Ayase

Yoasobi singles chronology
"Gekijō" (2025)	"Adrena" (2026)	"Baby" (2026)

Music video
- "Adrena" on YouTube; English version on YouTube

"Adrena" (Japanese: アドレナ, Hepburn: Adorena) is a song by Japanese duo Yoasobi from their fourth EP, The Book For, (2026). It was released as a single on January 4, 2026, through Echoes and Sony Music Entertainment Japan. The song serves as the opening theme for the 2026 anime series Hana-Kimi, and was based on Fuyu Tsuyama's short story Magical.

== Background and release ==
Aniplex first announced an anime adaptation of the manga series Hana-Kimi in May 2024. On September 14, 2025, at Aniplex Online Fest 2025, it was announced that Yoasobi would perform opening and ending themes for the anime series, set to premiere in January 2026. On November 8, the songs, alongside their titles—opening theme "Adrena" and ending theme "Baby"—and snippets, were revealed through the anime's promotional video.

On January 1, 2026, Yoasobi announced the release of "Adrena" for the next three days, the same day as the anime's premiere, via digital music and streaming platforms. Its cover artwork, illustrated by Naji Yanagida, features the anime protagonist Mizuki Ashiya. The limited double A-side CD single, alongside "Baby", was released on March 4, additionally containing the English, "anime edit", and instrumental versions of both songs. The English version was included on the duo's English-language EP, E-Side 4 (2026), while the original version on the duo's fourth Japanese-language EP, The Book For, (2026).

== Composition and lyrics ==
Fuyu Tsuyama wrote the short story Magical specifically for "Adrena". Published on the Hana-Kimi anime's website on January 3, 2026, it depicts a prequel to Mizuki's feelings for her love interest, Izumi Sano, and her experiences at school since then. Lyrically, the song expresses the protagonist's exhilaration and confusion and "straightforward yet awkward" and unrelenting love, as she pursues her dream boy, driven by "up-tempo pop track with comical sound and dizzying electronic developments".

== Music video ==
An accompanying music video for "Adrena" premiered on January 6, 2026. Directed by Tsuribu Tokyo, who previously handled Yoasobi's "Players" music video, the comical 3D-animated visual features characters from Hana-Kimi, including the protagonist, Mizuki, who runs, flies, and passes others amid a chaotic atmosphere. The English version's music video was uploaded on April 24.

== Live performances ==
Yoasobi debuted the performance of "Adrena" at Pentatonic music festival on January 24, 2026, at Yokohama Buntai. The duo later performed the song at the 2026 Central Music & Entertainment Festival and the Music Stadium in April.

== Track listing ==
- Digital download and streaming
1. "Adrena" (アドレナ) – 3:05
- CD single
1. "Adrena" – 3:07
2. "Baby" – 3:52
3. "Adrena" (English version) – 3:07
4. "Baby" (English version) – 3:52
5. "Adrena" (anime edit) – 1:30
6. "Baby" (anime edit) – 1:28
7. "Adrena" (instrumental) – 3:07
8. "Baby" (instrumental) – 3:52

== Credits and personnel ==
- Ayase – songwriting, arrangement, instruments
- Ikura – vocals
- Konnie Aoki – English version lyrics, English version lyrical and vocal recording direction
- BFNK – English version lyrical and vocal recording direction
- Fuyu Tsuyama – based story writer
- Masahiro Tamoto – vocal recording
- Manami Sugishita – vocal recording
- Kunio Nishikawara – vocal recording (English version)
- Masahiko Fukui – mixing
- Hidekazu Sakai – mastering

== Charts ==
Chart performance for "Adrena"
Chart (2026)	Peak position
Japan (Oricon) with "Baby"	19
Japan Combined Singles (Oricon)	42
Japan Anime Singles (Oricon) (with "Baby")	9
Japan Hot 100 (Billboard)	24
Japan Hot Animation (Billboard Japan)	9

== Release history ==
Release dates and formats for "Adrena"
Region	Date	Format	Version	Label	Ref.
Various	January 4, 2026	Digital download; streaming	Original	Echoes; Sony Japan	
Japan	March 4, 2026	CD	Limited (with "Baby")	Echoes; Sony Japan	
