= The Night of Hate Comments =

Korean television program

- Promotional poster with original hosts
- Also known as: The Night of Vicious Comments, Reply Night
- Hangul: 악플의 밤
- RR: Akpeurui bam
- MR: Akp'ŭrŭi pam
- Genre: Variety show, Talk show
- Directed by: Lee Na-ra; Jeong Jae-hoon; Chu Mi-rye
- Starring: Shin Dong-yup; Kim Sook; Kim Jong-min; Sulli
- Country of origin: South Korea
- Original language: Korean
- No. of episodes: 16

Production
- Running time: 60 minutes

Original release
- Network: JTBC2
- Release: June 21 – October 11, 2019

The Night of Hate Comments (Korean: 악플의 밤), also called The Night of Vicious Comments or Reply Night, was a South Korean variety show on JTBC2 which first aired on June 21, 2019. Through the sixteenth episode, the show's inaugural four hosts, Shin Dong-yup, Kim Sook, Kim Jong-min and Sulli welcomed celebrity guest(s) each week to discuss their reactions to hateful comments, malicious rumors, and cyberbullying they had encountered online. JTBC called it a new show "to help the stars become stronger psychologically". The show also brings up proper internet manners and etiquette.

On October 21, 2019, the show was cancelled after 16 episodes following Sulli's death.

== Background ==
The show's producing director is Lee Na-ra who produced another JTBC variety show, LAN Cable Life. Along with three hosts in their 40s, it was the first long-term hosting role for 25-year-old Sulli and her return to TV work after a number of years.

The show's format includes celebrity guests reading and discussing their own social media comments, and was noted to resemble Jimmy Kimmel's Celebrities Read Mean Tweets by Kang Hae-ryun in The Washington Post. On the first episode there were no guests and the four hosts set the show's tone, responding to comments about themselves, sometimes acknowledging agreement or disagreement.

On October 14, 2019, the cast and producers recorded another episode, per a Monday scheduling, unaware of the death of co-host Sulli, which was reported later in the day. Trailers and an upcoming episode were immediately cancelled, followed by an October 21 announcement that the show would not continue.

== Reception ==
Upon co-host Sulli's death, some viewers said that the show should be abolished due to the mental anguish it appeared to cause the celebrities as they read and discussed the hateful comments directed at them, and questioned whether such comments might have affected Sulli's psychological state prior to her death. But, others said they felt Sulli participated on the show to fight the culture of cyberbullying and admired her for it; and appreciated the show's efforts.

== Episode list ==
Ep.#	Date	Guest(s)	Name(s)	Summary	Ref.
1	June 21	No guest	Shin Dong-yup	There is a comment which says that Shin does not contribute anything to Animal Farm, where animals do all the work and My Little Old Boy, where mothers do all the work. Hence he is an old guy or "old fox" who appears on easy shows; which he disagrees. Another comment mentioned that he always wittily makes inappropriate comments, but he is actually nothing but a successful pervert; which he agrees.	
1	June 21	No guest	Kim Sook	One commenter says they are sick of seeing Kim on every show on every channel; which Kim disagrees with. Another comment says she should use dental floss to floss her teeth rather than slicing a watermelon with it.	
1	June 21	No guest	Kim Jong-min	A comment says that Kim does not know the value of the TV licence fee. Another comment says that he dances like "a wind doll flailing outside a karaoke".	
1	June 21	No guest	Sulli	One comment says that Sulli's SNS is her biggest success and she is an attention seeker; which she agrees with. Another says that she is a druggie; she disagrees and says that she does not take drugs or do anything illegal.	
2	June 28	Song Ga-in; Hong Ja; Park Sung-yeon	Song Ga-in	One comment says that when she sings, there is no emotion in it and it sounds like a robot. In addition, she will just disappear if she does not release any hit songs. For this hate comment, she did not acknowledge. She did acknowledge another comment which says that she has a typical pig face and she looks like a steamed bun that has been pressed when it is piping hot. She also disagreed with another hate comment asking her if she had a good night's sleep after selecting Hong Ja during the death match on 'Miss Trot'.	
2	June 28	Song Ga-in; Hong Ja; Park Sung-yeon	Hong Ja	There is a comment saying Hong Ja is just like the name of a Makgeolli bar owner. Therefore, she will only appeal to middle-aged fans. Another comment also said that she cannot sing traditional trot songs. The other comment also commented that she is kept on sticking with Song Ga-in even after 'Miss Trot' had ended. In addition, the person who wrote the comment also asked why she would do that when she was not at the same level as Song Ga-in. Hong Ja did not acknowledge all the above hate comments.	
2	June 28	Song Ga-in; Hong Ja; Park Sung-yeon	Park Sung-yeon	A comment asked if Sung-yeon has any connection since she did not reach Top 5 on the survival show, but she still appears on TV. Hence, for this statement, she refuted by saying that her company is too small for any connection. Another comment said that she got a full makeover which she agreed and admitted that she indeed went for plastic surgery before her debut. Sung-yeon disagreed the next statement which commented on her teeth being yellow, and said that she should just get them whitened. Lastly, she disagreed another comment pointing on her dancing while singing trot song on an event which ruined the whole trot music.	
3	July 5	Jun Jin (Shinhwa); Kim Seung-hyun			
4	July 12	Kim Ji-min; Sandeul (B1A4)			
5	July 19	Shin Ji (Koyote); Seunghee (Oh My Girl)	Shin Ji	She disagrees a comment which asked what had she done to make her face so messed up, one side is collapsing, and the other is too firm. It is as if she has those lumps of evil spirits that goblins have. Another comment said that she was a liar to lie that she only weighs 46 kg. Next comment also told since Shin Ji mentioned before that she was uncomfortable with Jong-min, so just let him go; which she agreed both statements.	
5	July 19	Shin Ji (Koyote); Seunghee (Oh My Girl)	Seunghee		
6	July 26	Tony An; BewhY			
7	August 2	Song Kyung-ah; Giant Pink			
8	August 9	Choi Hyun-seok; Oh Se-deuk			
9	August 16	Jang Su-won; John Park			
10	August 23	Hong Kyung-min; Seo Yu-ri			
11	August 30	Ham So-won; Hong Seok-cheon			
12	September 6	Joo Young-hoon; Norazo	Joo Young-hoon	He agreed on the statement saying that he always cause trouble with his reckless comments. He also agreed on another comment telling him to not get back on SNS again after closing his account during a bad situation and open backs when the situation had resolved.	
12	September 6	Joo Young-hoon; Norazo	Norazo	They agreed on the comments that their songs are like endless copies and they are duplicates of each other. They also agreed to the statement that they either took drugs or didn't take drugs that they should take while working on their songs. Won Heum also agreed that he is like a wallflower.	
13	September 20	Ji Sang-ryeol; Chun Myung-hoon			
14	September 27	Ha:tfelt; Nucksal			
15	October 4	Kim Soo-yong; Park Sung-kwang			
16	October 11	Alberto Mondi; Park Ki-ryang			
