= Fashion King (film) =

- Poster
- Directed by: Oh Ki-hwan
- Written by: Yoon In-wan
- Based on: Fashion King by Kian84
- Produced by: Cha Seung-jae
- Starring: Joo Won; Choi Jin-ri; Ahn Jae-hyun; Park Se-young; Kim Sung-oh
- Music by: Lee Jun-oh
- Production companies: YLAB; Nomad Films
- Distributed by: Next Entertainment World
- Release date: November 6, 2014
- Running time: 114 minutes
- Country: South Korea
- Language: Korean

Fashion King (Korean: 패션왕; RR: Paesyeonwang) is a 2014 South Korean coming-of-age romantic comedy film directed by Oh Ki-hwan, starring Joo Won, Choi Jin-ri, Ahn Jae-hyun, Park Se-young and Kim Sung-oh. This film that comically depicts coming of age a high school student as he matures into adulthood and discovers a passion for fashion design.

It is a film adaptation of the popular webtoon series Fashion King written by Kian84 (whose real name is Kim Hee-min), which was published on Naver from May 5, 2011, to June 6, 2013, and received four million hits.

== Plot ==
Woo Ki-myung, a completely ordinary high school student, has a crush on Hye-jin, the prettiest, most popular girl in class. So to win her heart, he decides to transform his image and become the coolest, best dressed person in the world. As his mentor Nam-jung introduces him to the world of fashion, Ki-myung finds himself entering into a rivalry with Won-ho, the school's toughest fighter. Meanwhile, he doesn't notice Eun-jin, who harbors a secret crush on him.

== Cast ==
- Joo Won as Woo Ki-myung
- Choi Jin-ri as Kwak Eun-jin
- Ahn Jae-hyun as Kim Won-ho
- Park Se-young as Park Hye-jin
- Kim Sung-oh as Kim Nam-jung
- Lee Il-hwa as Ki-myung's mother
- Shin Ju-hwan as Kim Chang-joo
- Min Jin-woong as Kim Doo-chi
- Kim Ian as Hyuk-soo
- Park Doo-shik as Sung-chul
- Woo Sang-jeon as Old monk
- Lee Geung-young as Won-ho's father (cameo)
- Kian84 as Woo Ki-myung's bully friend in previous school (cameo)
- Lee Dong-hwi as Duo man 2 (cameo)
- Han Hye-jin as herself, MC (cameo)
- Hong Seok-cheon as himself, MC (cameo)
- Kim Na-young as herself, MC (cameo)
- Horan (Clazziquai) as Female assistant (cameo)
- Lee Joo-young as Fashion King Korea judge (cameo)
- Jung Doo-young as Fashion King Korea judge (cameo)
- Oh Se-il as Fashion King Korea judge (cameo)
- Ahn Sun-young as Hanbok judge (cameo)
- Lee Hyo-jae as Hanbok judge (cameo)
- Hwang Byung-gook as Ki-myung's homeroom teacher (cameo)
- Nana as Kim Hae-na (cameo)

== Reception ==
The film received mixed reviews. IMDb rated the film 5.3/10.
