= Peet Montzingo =

American entertainer (born 1990)

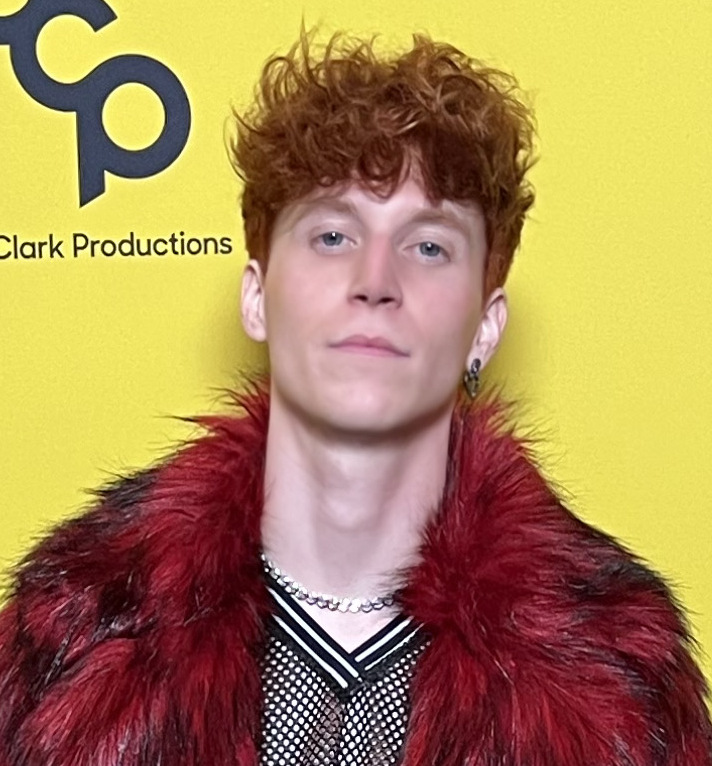
- Montzingo in 2023
- Born: Peter Montzingo; May 2, 1990 (age 36)
- Citizenship: United States
- Occupations: Internet personality, musician, writer

TikTok information
- Page: peetmontzingo
- Followers: 14.4 million

YouTube information
- Channel: Peet Montzingo
- Subscribers: 22.3 million
- Views: 17 billion
- Last updated: May 10, 2025

Peter "Peet" Montzingo (born May 2, 1990) is an American internet personality, musician and writer.

He is known best for his YouTube and TikTok videos showcasing a variety of content, which includes his family, all of whom have dwarfism.

== Biography and career ==
Montzingo is the third child of Darrel and Vicki Montzingo. In a piece published by The Seattle Times in January 1991, when he was several months old, it was stated "Everyone but Peter, who they aren't sure about yet, is a dwarf" and that "genetically, there's a 75 percent chance Peter will be, too. 'If he's going to be a dwarf, he had better start dwarfing soon,' Darrel says. 'At seven months he's only three pounds behind Andrew, who is about half the size of a normal 4-year-old.' Or maybe he'll take after the rest of Darrel's family, where the average height of the other four brothers hovers above 6 feet."

After completing his degree in film at Central Washington University, Montzingo studied acting.

Montzingo has twenty-four million followers across his social-media platforms. His YouTube channel was ranked seventeenth among the "Top 50 Most Viewed U.S. YouTube Channels" by Tubefilter. His videos show what it is like to be a tall person raised by a dwarf mother, besides serious videos tackling mental-health awareness and fascination with the supernatural, as he formerly lived across the street from the Cecil Hotel in Los Angeles, which has been the site of numerous incidents of deaths and violence. He also records and shares his experiences on TikTok.

In 2019, as a recording artist with the band 5WEST, he toured South Africa and Europe. The band did its first arena tour as the supporting act for Boyzone in the autumn of 2019.

In 2022, Montzingo co-wrote a picture book titled Little Imperfections: A Tall Tale of Growing Up Different, along with Rockwell Sands. The book covers the theme of being different, and is told through the perspective of Montzingo himself.

== Selected work ==
Credits
Year	Title	Role	Reference
2010	iCarly	iCarly's Biggest Fan	
2010	Meadowoods	Ryan's Friend	
2011	The X Factor	Auditionee	
2013	The Homecoming	Jonas	
2016	Breaking Free	Calum	
2021	Jeff Lewis Live	Peet Montzingo	
2022	Jax Writes Songs	Peet Montzingo	

== Bibliography ==
- Little Imperfections (ISBN 9798986283609)

== Music ==
On March 15, 2024, Peet released his debut single “Party With A Weirdo” Produced by HARV (Justin Bieber, Post Malone) and co-written with Felisha King Harvey (Normani, Mario). He then followed with his next songs Carousel, Bitch Let Me Go Off, and Paranoia
