= Real (2017 film) =

- Theatrical release poster
- Hangul: 리얼
- RR: Rieol
- MR: Riŏl
- Directed by: Lee Sa-rang
- Screenplay by: Lee Jung-sub
- Produced by: Kim Mi-hye; Lee Jeong-seok
- Starring: Kim Soo-hyun; Sung Dong-il; Lee Sung-min; Choi Jin-ri; Jo Woo-jin
- Cinematography: Kim Jung-won; Kim Seong-jin
- Edited by: Kim Chang-ju
- Music by: Lee Jae-jin
- Distributed by: CJ E&M (South Korea); Alibaba Pictures (China); Global Road Entertainment (International)
- Release dates: June 28, 2017 (South Korean); May 5, 2018 (United States)
- Running time: 137 minutes
- Country: South Korea
- Language: Korean
- Budget: US$10 million
- Box office: US$3 million

Real (Korean: 리얼) is a 2017 South Korean neo-noir action thriller film directed by Lee Sa-rang. It stars Kim Soo-hyun, Sung Dong-il, Lee Sung-min, Sulli, and Jo Woo-jin. The film was released on June 28, 2017, in South Korea.

== Synopsis ==
In the underworld of a fictional city, Jang Tae-yeong is a successful crime syndicate boss and owner of a large casino set to open under the name Siesta. However, his world is shaken when Jo Won-geun, a powerful underworld kingpin, appears and claims ownership of the casino, putting Jang's empire at risk. To secure his future, Jang searches for an investor to solve his financial troubles.

At the same time, Jang struggles with an entirely different personality lurking within himself, one that threatens his control over his own mind. Jang decides to seek the help of Dr. Choi Jin-ki, who comes up with an elaborate plan to rid him of this other self. But the treatment yields unexpected consequences—a mysterious investor, identical in both name and appearance, suddenly emerges. What then ensues is a battle between the real and fake Jang Tae-Yeong.

== Cast ==
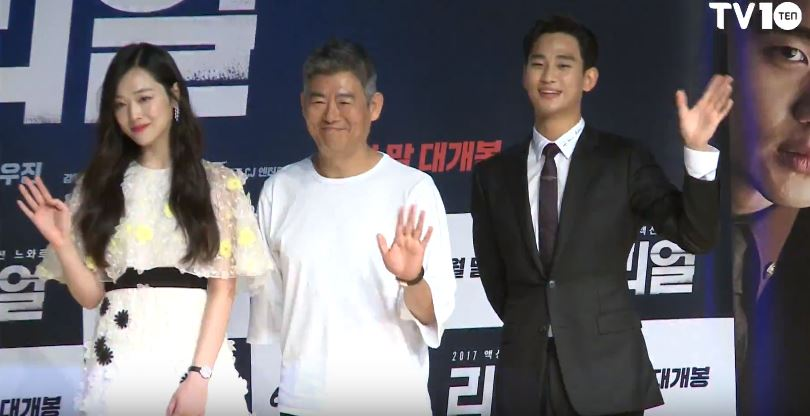
Sulli, Sung Dong-il and Kim Soo-hyun at the press conference

- Kim Soo-hyun as Jang Tae-yeong
- Sung Dong-il as Jo Won-geun
- Lee Sung-min as Dr. Choi Jin-ki
- Choi Jin-ri as Song Yoo-hwa
- Jo Woo-jin as Sa Do-jin
- Kim Hong-pa as Choi Nak-hyeon
- Jung In-gyeom as Professor Kim
- Choi Kwon as Head of Department Baek
- Han Ji-eun as Han Ye-won
- Ko Kyu-pil as Bald head
- Jung Yi-Hyun as Secret room club addict
- Park Min-jung as Private hospital room nurse
- Lee Sang-hoon
- Yoon Ji-kyeon
- Yoon Kyung-ho as Broker
- Hyun Bong-sik as Chinese gangster
- Nam Kyung as Casino Waitress
- Lee Geung-young as Noh Yeom
- Rich Ting as Ryu Gil-soo
- Park Seo-joon as Dressed-up bodyguard
- Son Hyun-joo as Patient with disability
- Kim Da-som as Rehabilitation therapist
- Park Gyeong-ree as Restaurant Waitress
- Ahn So-hee as Chinatown's sewing room worker
- Lee Ji-eun as Awards ceremony guide
- Suzy as Song Yoo-hwa's best friend
- Park Min-ha as Siesta's serving fairy

== Production ==
- On October 12, 2015, Alibaba Pictures signed an agreement at the 20th Busan International Film Festival to fund the film. Paradise Group also co-invested with additional US$7 million. It also filmed in the corporation's resort, Paradise City.
- Director Lee Jung-sub dropped out of the film and was replaced by Lee Sa-rang, first-time filmmaker, owner of the production company of Real.
- Filming began on January 3, 2016, and ended on June 30, 2016, in Paradise City, Yeongjongdo, Incheon.

== Release ==
The film was released cinematically on 28 June 2017, and later digitally in mid-July in South Korea.

Taiwan became the first region outside of South Korea to have a cinematic release of the film, on 4 August 2017. It was released in Hong Kong on 16 November 2017 and in Japan on 14 April 2018.

== Reception ==
Real received mostly negative reviews. MaxMovie's review stated that despite Kim Soo-hyun giving justice to his dual roles, the film's plot is non-existent, the editing and special effects are amateurish, in addition to its action scenes being boring. One critic felt the story was confusing and named the film "one of the most distastrous films ever made".

One critic proclaims Real to be a "future camp cult classic" that "is the 'real' deal". Sitges Film Festival, one of the world's foremost international festivals specialising in fantasy and horror films, has included Real in its 2017 catalogue. The experimental adventure that is Real is in Kim Soo Hyun's words, not an endearing film that is easy for moviegoers to fall in love with. Yet, in the end, love it or hate it, there is no denying that Real is "one of the most singular Korean films to emerge in years".

When Real was released for Digital Cable TV VOD and IPTV subscription in South Korea, it topped the charts at its initial release. In contrast to its box office response, the movie fared reasonably well on the VOD chart. While it is released via VOD platform only in mid July, the movie ranked quite high on the overall chart of July 2017.

Real received positive reviews upon its opening in Taiwan in early August. Critics praised Kim Soo Hyun's acting, proclaiming that both main characters, despite looking identical, were easily distinguished through his use of body language, mannerisms, and voice acting.

Expat Korean movie critic/blogger Pierce Conran included Real in his list of top 15 Korean movies of 2017 for its uniqueness and originality.

== Box office ==
Real grossed over $1M NTD (New Taiwan Dollar) in its first weekend of release in Taiwan. It was the highest initial week box office take for a Korean film at the time. The film grossed over $4.7M NTD in Taiwan.
