= Welcome to the Show (TV series) =

- Promotional poster
- Also known as: 웰컴 투 더 쇼
- Genre: Comedy, Sitcom
- Written by: Choi Moon-kyung; Woo Chul-won
- Directed by: Park Seung-min
- Starring: Lim Seul-ong; Sulli; Nichkhun; Kim Jang-hoon; Kim Kwang-kyu
- Country of origin: South Korea
- Original languages: Korean; English
- No. of episodes: 1

Production
- Running time: approx. 80 minutes Wednesday at 23:15

Original release
- Network: SBS
- Release: March 16, 2011

Welcome to the Show (Korean: 웰컴 투 더 쇼) was a 2011 South Korean television sitcom that aired on SBS. It starred Lim Seul-ong, Sulli, Nichkhun, Kim Jang-hoon, and Kim Kwang-kyu. SBS's real life show Inkigayo serves as the backdrop to the show.

== Synopsis ==
The sitcom shows the behind-the-scenes action of idol singers, studio artists, managers and producers on SBS's Inkigayo. The show drew its stories from idols, seniors, juniors, managers, and producers that actually run Inkigayo.

Sulli and Nickhun are supposedly dating and seem like they are very much in the honeymoon phase. Seulong likes Sulli as well, but cannot do anything about it due to the fact that he believes Sulli and Nickhun are together. During the live recording he tries to incite trouble for Nickhun, much to the dismay of his co-MCs and crew. Meanwhile, the singer Maestro 'Mae' (Kim Jang-hoon), who can be petulant and arrogant, is having his comeback stage after 5 years, but suffers from the lack of respect given to him by juniors. He and his manager (Kim Kwang-kyu), cautious and careful not to anger Mae, have a comedic, but moving tumultuous relationship.

== History ==
On February 14, 2011 SBS revealed that they had Kim Jang-hoon, Kim Kwang-kyu, 2AM's Im Seulong, f(x)'s Sulli Choi, and 2PM's Nichkhun in its upcoming sitcom, which they had started preparing the year before. An SBS representative said, "The new cast had their first recording on the 13th at SBS's Inkigayo studio. There will be a big idol cast with a 'mellow line' between them. Other older actors and singers will also be taking part. Although the broadcast date hasn't been finalized yet, we're aiming for a March release." The producers also revealed that though the show was being prepared as a series that they will observe viewer responses after the pilot airs before making any final decisions.

On March 9, SBS confirmed that TVXQ, IU, BEAST, and other idol singers would be making appearances. It was later revealed that day that the show would air on March 16. On March 14, SBS released a teaser for the show.

The pilot aired on March 16, 2011. Due to poor ratings the show was scrapped despite viewers liking the new concept.

== Cast ==
The main cast of Welcome to the Show. From left to right: Kim Kyung-jin, Nickhun, Lee Hae-in, IU, Sulli, Kim Kwang-kyu, Kim Jang-hoon, and Seulong.

Main cast

- Lim Seul-ong as Seul-ong
- Sulli as Sulli
- Nichkhun as Nickhun
- Kim Jang-hoon as Maestro, a singer
- Kim Kwang-kyu as Manager
- Park Gwang-hyun as PD
- Lee Hae-in as Assistant Director
- Kim Kyung-jin as FD
- Lee Ji-eun as Herself
- Krystal Jung as Herself
- Yoon Gi-won as Manager of 2AM & Oska (Secret Garden)
- Seo Hyun-chul as Technical Director

Cameos

- Jung Yun-ho
- Shim Chang-min
- Lee Jung
- Seungho
- G.O
- Thunder
- Yong Jun-hyung
- Yang Yo-seob
- Dal Shabet
- Infinite
- Jewelry
- ZE:A
- G.NA
- Stellar
- Eric Mun
- Teen Top
- Girls' Generation

== Music ==
- "Hana Yori Dango Returns Main Theme" by Yamashita Kosuke
- "Yayaya" by T-ARA
- "BTD" by INFINITE
- "Keep Your Head Down" by TVXQ
- "Can't Let You Go Even If I Die" by 2AM
- "Hoot" by Girls' Generation

== Ratings ==
Episode	Broadcast date	TNmS ratings	
Episode	Broadcast date	Average audience share	
Episode	Broadcast date	Entire Country	Seoul National Capital Area
1	March 16, 2011	7.6%	8.3%
