= Persona (TV series) =

2019 South Korean television series

- Promotional poster
- Hangul: 페르소나
- RR: Pereusona
- MR: P'erŭsona
- Genre: Anthology series
- Created by: Yoon Jong-shin
- Written by: Lee Kyoung-mi; Yim Pil-sung; Jeon Go-woon; Kim Jong-kwan
- Directed by: Lee Kyoung-mi; Yim Pil-sung; Jeon Go-woon; Kim Jong-kwan
- Starring: Lee Ji-eun
- Country of origin: South Korea
- Original language: Korean
- No. of episodes: 4

Production
- Producer: Park Kwansu
- Running time: 19–27 minutes
- Production companies: Mystic Story; Kirin Productions

Original release
- Network: Netflix
- Release: April 11, 2019

Persona (Korean: 페르소나) is a South Korean anthology television series starring Lee Ji-eun. It contains separate stories each directed by a different director. The first season was released on April 11, 2019.

== Plot ==
The series is separated into four segments: Love Set, Collector, Kiss Burn and Walking at Night.

== Cast ==
=== Season 1 ===
==== Main ====
- Lee Ji-eun as IU / Eun / Han-na / Ji-eun

==== "Love Set" ====
- Bae Doona as Doona
- Kim Tae-hoon as IU's father
- Pierce Conran as Pierce

==== "Collector" ====
- Park Hae-soo as Baek Jeong-u
- Jung Ki-hoon as Eun's yoga friend
- Bae So-young as Ji-soo
- Jo Hyun-sub as Ji-soo's boyfriend
- Andrew Royce Beasley as Eun's foreign friend
- Mario Adrion as Eun's foreign friend

==== "Kiss Burn" ====
- Shim Dal-gi as Hye-bok
- Lee Sung-wook as Jung-geun

==== "Walking at Night" ====
- Jung Joon-won as K

== Episodes ==
=== Season 1 (2019) ===
No. overall	No. in season	Title	Directed by	Written by	Original release date
1	1	"Love Set"	Lee Kyoung-mi	Lee Kyoung-mi	April 11, 2019
2	2	"Collector"	Yim Pil-sung	Yim Pil-sung	April 11, 2019
3	3	"Kiss Burn"	Jeon Go-woon	Jeon Go-woon	April 11, 2019
4	4	"Walking at Night"	Kim Jong-kwan	Kim Jong-kwan	April 11, 2019

== Release ==
The first season was originally set to be released on Netflix on April 5, 2019 but the release was postponed to April 11 out of respect for the victims of the Gangwon Province Fire.

The second season, Persona: Sulli, will be released as a feature film in the second half of 2023 and is divided into two parts: the first one, titled 4: Clean Island, stars Sulli, while the second one is a documentary/interview titled Dear Jinri. In particular, Dear Jinri will premiere at the 28th Busan International Film Festival.

== Production ==
Mystic Story revealed on October 23, 2019, that they had decided to temporarily suspend the production of the second season as Sulli, who was cast as the main lead, was in the midst of filming the second out of five planned episodes for the series when she died.

== Reception ==
Persona was the sixth most popular program on Netflix in Korea in 2019.
