= Fashion King (manhwa) =

South Korean manhwa by Kian84

패션왕 RR: Paesyeonwang MR: P'aesyŏnwang
- Genre: Romantic comedy
- Author: Kian84
- Publisher: (South Korea) Joongang Books
- Magazine: Naver WEBTOON
- Original run: 2011–2013
- Collected volumes: 2

Fashion King (Korean: 패션왕) is a South Korean manhwa series written and illustrated by Kian84. Started on May 5, 2011, this webtoon manhwa was released on Naver WEBTOON. The print release of the first volume of Fashion King was released on December 2, 2012. The comics have been adapted into a film of the same name.
