= Hana-Kimi =

Japanese manga series written by Hisaya Nakajo

- North American cover of the eighth manga volume featuring (clockwise from top) Hokuto Umeda, Shuichi Nakatsu, Minami Nanba and Izumi Sano

花ざかりの君たちへ (Hanazakari no Kimitachi e)
- Genre: Romance
- Manga
- Written by: Hisaya Nakajo
- Published by: Hakusensha
- English publisher: NA: Viz Media
- Imprint: Hana to Yume Comics
- Magazine: Hana to Yume
- Original run: September 20, 1996 – August 20, 2004
- Volumes: 23
- Anime television series
- Directed by: Natsuki Takemura
- Written by: Takao Yoshioka
- Music by: Masaru Yokoyama
- Studio: Signal.MD
- Licensed by: Crunchyroll
- Original network: Tokyo MX, BS11, MBS, CBC, RKB (S1-2); GYT, GTV (S2)
- Original run: January 4, 2026 – September 24, 2026
- Episodes: 25
- Television drama
- Hanazakarino Kimitachihe (2006, Taiwan); Hana-Kimi (2007, Japan); Hanazakari no Kimitachi e (2011, Japan); To the Beautiful You (2012, South Korea); Hana-Kimi (2026, Japan)

Hanazakari no Kimitachi e (花ざかりの君たちへ; lit. 'For You in Full Blossom'), abbreviated as Hana-Kimi, is a Japanese manga series written and illustrated by Hisaya Nakajo. it was serialized in Hakusensha's semi-monthly shōjo manga magazine Hana to Yume from September 1996 to August 2004. The series is also published in English by Viz Media, with the final volume released in April 2008. It was also adapted into several live-action television dramas. An anime television series adaptation produced by Signal.MD aired from January to March 2026. A second season aired from July to September of the same year.

The series centers on Mizuki Ashiya, a Japanese girl who lives in the United States. One day, she sees a track and field competition on TV, and becomes attracted to one of the high jump competitors, Izumi Sano. She begins to idolize the young athlete and eventually transfers to Japan to attend the same school that Sano attends. Sano attends an all-boys high school named Osaka Gakuen and Mizuki attempts to disguise herself as a boy to enter.

== Setting ==
Osaka Gakuen (桜咲学園; Ohsaka Academy) is an all-boys school and the setting of the series. Its sister school is St. Blossoms, an all-girls high school.

The three grade levels are divided into three classes. These nine classes are divided into three dormitories, as most of the students do not stay around the school area. The cultures within the individual dormitories are immensely different.

Most students residing in the first dormitory are athletes who were accepted into Osaka High on a sports scholarship. The students in the second dorm are a mix of athletes and scholars who have sports or academic scholarships. The third dormitory consists mainly of artistic and intelligent people. Inter-dorm rivalries are common and become particularly intense during the school's cultural festival.

== Plot ==
Mizuki Ashiya, a Japanese girl living in the United States, watches a program on TV featuring a high jumper named Izumi Sano. She was amazed by his performance and begins following his athletic career. Years later, she does research on him and discovers that he is currently attending Osaka High School. The school is unfortunately an all-boys school and Mizuki convinces her parents to send her to Japan by herself.

Oblivious to the fact that their daughter is going to attend a boys' school, her parents let her go. Wanting to enter the school, Mizuki cuts off her long hair, disguises herself as a man, and tries her best to give hope to Sano after hearing that he no longer does the high jump. As she settles in, an accident reveals her identity to Hokuto Umeda, the school doctor, and Izumi Sano. Izumi hides his knowledge of Mizuki's gender and tries to help her keep her secret, which may not be easy because many situations land Mizuki in compromising positions that will reveal her true gender.

== Characters ==
Mizuki Ashiya (芦屋 瑞稀, Ashiya Mizuki)
Voiced by: Houko Kuwashima (drama CD), Aya Yamane (anime) (Japanese); Katelyn Barr (English)
Mizuki Ashiya is the cheerful and fun-loving female protagonist of the series, who admired Izumi Sano the moment she saw him participating in a high jump tournament on TV. Mizuki disguises herself as a boy to enroll herself into the all-boys Osaka Academy.
Izumi Sano (佐野 泉, Sano Izumi)
Voiced by: Atsushi Kisaichi (drama CD), Taku Yashiro (anime) (Japanese); Wyatt Baker (English)
Izumi Sano is the male protagonist of the series. A former professional high jumper, Sano stopped for personal reasons when he entered high school. Sano found out Mizuki's true gender due to an accident early in the series.
Shūichi Nakatsu (中津 秀一, Nakatsu Shūichi)
Voiced by: Showtaro Morikubo (drama CD), Kikunosuke Toya (anime) (Japanese); Dallas Reid (English)
Shūichi Nakatsu is one of the students in living in the second dormitory. He likes Mizuki but does not know her true gender, causing some of his classmates to believe that he is homosexual.
Minami Nanba (難波 南, Nanba Minami)
Voiced by: Shin-ichiro Miki (drama CD), Yūichirō Umehara (anime) (Japanese); Joshua Waters (English)
Minami Nanba is the head of the second dormitory.
Hokuto Umeda (梅田北斗, Umeda Hokuto)
Voiced by: Kazuya Ichijō (drama CD), Jun Fukuyama (anime) (Japanese); Reagan Murdock (English)
Senri Nakao (中央 千里, Nakaō Senri)
Voiced by: Chiharu Tezuka (drama CD), Reiji Kawashima (anime) (Japanese); Justin Briner (English)
Daiki Kayashima (萱島 大樹, Dayashima Taiki)
Voiced by: Kentarō Itō (drama CD), Koki Uchiyama (anime) (Japanese); Ethan Condon (English)
Kyogo Sekime (関目 京悟, Sekime Kyōgo)
Voiced by: Wataru Komada (anime) (Japanese); Tom Henry (English)
Shinji Noe (野江 伸二, Noe Shinji)
Voiced by: Hiroyuki Yoshino (drama CD), Anan Furuya (anime) (Japanese); Ben Stegmair (English)
Wataru Nihonbashi (日本 橋渉, Nihonbashi Wataru)
Voiced by: Koutaro Nishiyama (anime) (Japanese); Tyson Rinehart (English)
Julia Maxwell (ジュリア・マックスウェル, Jyuria Makkusuweru)
Voiced by: Yūko Natsuyoshi (anime) (Japanese); Jaclyn Thomas (English)
Makoto Kagurazaka (神楽坂 真言, Kagurazaka Makoto)
Voiced by: Satoshi Hino (anime) (Japanese); Alex Hom (English)
Megumi Tennoji (天王寺 恵, Tennōji Megumi)
Voiced by: Toshiyuki Morikawa (drama CD), Masaaki Mizunaka (anime)
Itsuki Kujo (九条 威月, Kujō Itsuki)
Voiced by: Ryōtarō Okiayu (drama CD), Junya Enoki (anime) (Japanese); Aaron Dismuke (English)
Masao Himejima (姫島 正夫, Himejima Masao)
Voiced by: Takehito Koyasu (drama CD, anime)

== Media ==
=== Manga ===
The series' volumes were first published under the Hana to Yume Comics imprint, which were then later re-published into 12 volumes of aizōban under the Hana to Yume Comics Special imprint. Each volume featured a new cover illustration and design, as well as colored pages.

The series was also published in English by Viz Media, which was initially only limited to Waldenbooks from February to May 2004, and then made available to other retail stores after May of that same year. In March 2012, Viz Media released a 3-in-1 edition of all the previously published Hana-Kimi manga in North America, which instead of the series' volumes, spans a total of eight 3-in-1 large manga special edition books. The last volume was published in April 2014.

=== Books ===
An illustration collection, titled Hanazakari no Kimi-tachi e: Hisaya Nakajō Kakushu (花ざかりの君たちへ—中条比紗也画集), was released on May 19, 2004. 11 days later, on May 30, a character book, titled Hanazakari no Kimi-tachi e: Hisaya Nakajō Character Book (花ざかりの君たちへ—中条比紗也キャラクターブック, Hanazakari no Kimi-tachi e: Nakajō Hisaya Kyarakutā Bukku; For You in Full Blossom: Hisaya Nakajo Character Book). The illustration collection was also licensed in English by Viz Media under the title The Art of Hana-Kimi, which was released on November 21, 2006.

On August 20, 2009, a manga anthology was published as a tribute to the series was released under the Hana to Yume Comics Special imprint. Titled Hanazakari no Kimitachi e Tribute: 35th Anniversary Hana to Yume Memorial (花ざかりの君たちへトリビュ-ト — 35周年花とゆめメモリアル, Hanazakari no Kimi-tachi e Toribyūto: 35-shūnen Hana to Yume Memoriaru), it was drawn by various manga artists, including Satoshi Morie, who was affiliated with the magazine where Hana-Kimi was serialized. The cover was illustrated by the original author herself.

=== Drama CDs ===
There were a number of drama CDs released for the series. Only 2 were released commercially by Hakusensha and Marine Entertainment. The first drama CD was released on April 26, 2000. The second drama CD, titled Hanazakari no Kimitachi e II (花ざかりの君たちへ II), was released on August 23, 2002.

=== Live-action drama ===
Hana-Kimi was adapted into several television dramas around the Asia, one in Taiwan in 2006, two in Japan in 2007 and 2011, and one in South Korea in 2012. A third Japanese television drama was announced on November 7, 2026 to commemorate the manga's 30th anniversary. The series is set to premiere on Nippon TV on December 5, 2026, and will run for eight episodes.

=== Anime ===
On May 15, 2024, an anime adaptation was announced by Aniplex, which was later confirmed to be a television series produced by Signal.MD and directed by Natsuki Takemura, with Shigeru Ueda serving as assistant director, Takao Yoshioka handling series composition, Su Shi Yi designing the characters, and Masaru Yokoyama composing the music. The series aired from January 4 to March 22, 2026, on Tokyo MX and other networks. The opening theme song is "Adrena" (アドレナ, Adorena), while the ending theme song is "Baby", both performed by Yoasobi. Crunchyroll is streaming the series.

Following the airing of the final episode, a second season was announced, and aired from July 2 to September 24, 2026. (Note: Tokyo MX listed the season premiere on July 1 at 24:30, which is effectively July 2 at 12:30 a.m. JST.) The opening theme song is "Flashbulb", while the ending theme song is "Bouquet" (花束, Hanataba), both performed by Omoinotake.

==== Episodes ====
===== Season 1 (2026) =====
No. overall	No. in season	Title	Directed by (Note: Production staff information is taken from the ending credits of each episode.)	Storyboarded by	Original release date
1	1	"Please Be My Friend!"; Transliteration: "Otomodachi ni Natte Kudasai!" (Japanese: お友達になってください！)	Son Seung-Hui	Son Seung-Hui	January 4, 2026
Mizuki convinces her parents to transfer her to Osaka Academy in Japan. However, her parents are unaware she is transferring to meet Sano, a high-jumper she admires. She also has not told her parents Osaka is an all-boys school and she will be disguising herself as male. On her first day, she asks to be Sano's friend but is misinterpreted as asking him on a date, causing their classmates to mistake her as homosexual. Sano's friend Nakatsu shows her Dormitory 2 where he, Sano, and Mizuki will be living. Mizuki also meets school doctor Umeda. Mizuki is shocked to learn boys share rooms and her roommate is Sano. Pet dog Yujiro is immediately taken with Mizuki, surprising Nakatsu as Yujiro only shows affection to girls. After learning Mizuki is his fan Sano reveals he recently quit high jumping. Dormitory Rep Nanba reveals Mizuki already has admirers for being cute, upsetting the dorm's previous idol Nakao. During PE class, Mizuki breaks Nakatsu's record for the 100m sprint, becoming a recruitment target for all the sports clubs. She finds Sano asleep in the garden and is tempted to kiss him but stops herself. Nakatsu challenges her to a football game but accidentally knocks her unconscious. Sano carries her to Umeda's clinic, who discovers her true gender.
2	2	"I Want to Be with You"; Transliteration: "Issho ni Itai no" (Japanese: 一緒にいたいの)	Yuuichi Satou & Kazuya Ishiguri	Atsushi Ōtsuki	January 11, 2026 (Note: From Episode 2, episodes are released on Prime Video and Crunchyroll a week before their televised airings.)
Sano interrupts before Mizuki and Umeda can talk. She worries Sano might notice while carrying her. Meanwhile, Sano noticed and is surprised no one else has. Classmate Nihonbashi posts a compromising picture of Mizuki and Sano in the garden, so Mizuki punches him. Nakatsu is confused when Mizuki makes his heart race without reason. Mizuki overhears a girl called Rika talking to Sano about an accident where he saved her but hurt his leg. She urges him to return to jumping now his leg has healed, but Sano refuses. Sano catches Mizuki eavesdropping and explains Rika was a middle school classmate. Sano saves Mizuki from a speeding car, causing Mizuki to realise she wants to be with him and should tell him the truth. Nakatsu becomes excited at the chance for an indirect kiss with Mizuki via a bottle of tea, but becomes confused why it excited him. Mizuki sees Sano watching the high jumping club and is happy he still does high jump. Sano admits he spoke to Rika again. A flashback shows Mizuki stood up to Umeda and refused to drop out of school in order to support Sano in returning to jumping. That night, Sano almost sees her in the shower, making him wonder if she is oblivious or trying to be exposed on purpose.
3	3	"I Won't Lose!"; Transliteration: "Makerumonka!" (Japanese: 負けるもんか！)	Takeshi Kabumoto	Rei Nakahara	January 18, 2026
Nakatsu frets about his attraction to Mizuki. Mizuki gets her period and is forced to ask Umeda for medication. Rika demands Mizuki stop distracting Sano from returning to jumping and tries to slap her but is stopped by Sano, who reveals he quit jumping because he could not stand the pressure. He is surprised Mizuki becomes mad at him for being cruel to Rika. Mizuki receives a package from her parents and shares the sweets with Nakatsu, Sekimei, and Noe. Unfortunately, the package also contains a dress she quickly claims is a prank. Sano stops speaking to her after their fight. Nanba, Umeda's nephew, remembers his mother sent him a package for Umeda. Nakatsu finds Mizuki crying over her fight with Sano and awkwardly consoles her. Nakatsu confronts Sano about Mizuki and they almost fight. Sano spots Nanba talking to Mizuki and panics as Nanba is a notorious womaniser. He loses them and is forced to threaten the eavesdropping Nihonbashi into revealing they went to the student council room. Luckily, he finds them just sharing coffee but Nanba subtly warns Sano to be nicer to Mizuki. Sano admits to Mizuki he hesitates under pressure, so he quit and missed his chance for an athletic scholarship. He is tired of being scared and wants to jump again, and they awkwardly reconcile. Nakatsu vents his frustration by punishing Nihonbashi for stalking Mizuki.
4	4	"The Source of Strength"; Transliteration: "Genki no Moto" (Japanese: 元気の素)	Shigeru Ueda	Shigeru Ueda	January 25, 2026
Sano rejoins the track team. Mizuki learns everyone is excited for a football game, since their opponents are co-ed so there will be girls. Nakatsu asks Mizuki to watch him play but is disappointed when she turns up with Sano, Sekimei and Noe. Sano's old jumping rival, Kagurazaka, mocks his return to jumping, angering Mizuki. Kayashima's family send him an entire box of lemons so Mizuki suggests a hot-pot party. Kagurazaka upsets Mizuki yet is shocked when she slaps him. He leaves after challenging Sano to a rematch while Sano can't help laughing. It is unclear whether Kagurazaka realised Mizuki is a girl. While walking Yujiro Mizuki tells him she came to Japan for Sano. Overhearing this, Sano invites her to watch him jump. Unfortunately, he is out of practise and can't clear the middle height jumps. Umeda assures Mizuki Sano's problem is psychological, and will probably need her support as he works through the stress. Nanba finally leaves Umeda's gift from his sister at the dorm's front desk, a bottle of alcohol, which is accidentally mixed in with the non-alcoholic drinks of the hot-pot party. Sano drinks most of it and Mizuki finds him drunk in their room where he suddenly kisses her.
5	5	"Do They Hate Me?"; Transliteration: "Kirawareten no Kanā" (Japanese: 嫌われてんのかなぁ)	Kazuya Ishiguri & Takanori Yano	Daisuke Kurose	February 1, 2026
Mizuki punches him and runs away. Sano awakens the next morning with amnesia and a black eye. Mizuki feigns ignorance but Nanba knows something happened, so he tells her about the alcohol. Mizuki is relieved Sano must have been drunk. Umeda is amused Nanba is being manipulative. Someone else eavesdropping is so angry they fill Mizuki's shoe locker with thumbtacks. Mizuki pretends not to care, even when her school shoes are soaked in water, but again she ignores it. Nakao tries to pick on Mizuki but is sent away by Nakatsu and Nanba. Next, Mizuki's desk is vandalised so she accuses Nakao and he admits he is in love with Nanba, so when Nanba took an interest in Mizuki he became angry. Mizuki admits there is someone she loves too, so she convinces Nakao to become friends. Kagurazaka returns to challenge Sano to beat him in the preliminary competitions. Mizuki is surprised when a girl gives her a gift, not to confess, but to thank her for standing up to Kagurazaka. Then her friend does confess to Sano, and Mizuki is both relieved and frustrated when he turns her down. She asks Umeda for advice and he deduces she is jealous other girls can confess while she can't. Mizuki's brother announces he is coming to Japan as he got a job nearby.
6	6	"My Big Brother's Coming!"; Transliteration: "Nī-chan ga Kuru!" (Japanese: 兄ちゃんが来る！)	Masayuki Matsumoto	Ichizō Kobayashi	February 8, 2026
Mizuki visits Umeda, interrupting him with his friend-with-benefits Misaki, and asks to borrow clothes from his sister Rio. Dressed as a girl she meets her brother Shizuki. Mizuki is glad Shizuki is actually only staying two weeks and hopes he doesn't encounter Sano as he never liked him. The next day Shizuki catches her dressed as a boy and meets Sano. Grasping the situation quickly, and without mentioning Mizuki is a girl, he demands Sano jump the high bar at the preliminaries or he will take Mizuki home. Nakatsu helps Mizuki feel better by taking her for okonomiyaki. Sano notices Mizuki is worrying so he reassures her his main goal is still beating Kagurazaka, not impressing Shizuki. Umeda catches Shizuki spying and guesses he is Mizuki's sister, so he torments him for a while. Sano asks Mizuki to stay in Japan even if he doesn't make the jump. Shizuki arrives to mock him, then faints when Mizuki says she hates him. Mizuki tries to buy Sano a good luck charm but buys a love and marriage charm by mistake, which Sano accepts anyway. During the preliminaries Sano easily clears the top bar but fails to make it to the next stage, making Mizuki cry. Shizuki returns to America but insists Mizuki visit for Christmas.
7	7	"Because I'm a Guy!"; Transliteration: "Ore, Otoko desu Kara!" (Japanese: おれ、男ですから！)	Shigeru Ueda	Shigeki Awai	February 15, 2026
With the dormitory being renovated Mizuki, Sano and Nakatsu have nowhere to stay. Sano worries about Mizuki returning to America during the renovations. Nakatsu offers to let Mizuki stay with him at his parents' house, but she refuses as the risk of discovery is too high. Sano invites her to his home, which she considers since they already share a room. That night Mizuki climbs into Sano's bed while half asleep and he is forced to let her stay when he can't wake her. The next morning she is humiliated but tries to pass it off as meaningless. Mizuki asks Umeda for a place to stay and ends up being manipulated into helping at his older sister Io's boarding house. Sano and Nakatsu end up volunteering as well. At the boarding house employee Makita notices Mizuki is a girl straight away and decides to seduce her, despite her insistence she is male. The situation worsens when Kagurazaka arrives as a guest with his sisters, the older of whom, Tamami, has a crush on Sano. The baby sister, Kyomi, has the same personality as Kagurazaka and aggravates Nakatsu. Tamami asks Mizuki if Sano has a girlfriend, and when Mizuki panics and admits he doesn't, Tamami decides to seduce Sano.
8	8	"It's Not Like We Could Become Lovers"; Transliteration: "Koibito ni Nanka, Narenai no Ni" (Japanese: 恋人になんか、なれないのに)	Yuya Tanaka	Kiyotaka Ohata	February 22, 2026
Mizuki fears she is gaining weight as it is becoming more difficult to hide her breasts. She later collapses after wrapping her chest too tightly, but Sano covers her up while she is unconscious. She later has a bath but forgets to lock the door and Nakatsu walks in. Fortunately, he gets a nosebleed and passes out without seeing anything. Tamami continues clinging to Sano while Makita tries to get closer to Mizuki. In the end Kagurazaka warns her about Makita, and to stop letting Tamami do whatever she wants. Mizuki naively assumes everything is fine, then argues with Sano when he warns her about Makita too. Mizuki realises she hasn't gained weight, but her breasts have grown. During a trip to the beach Mizuki tries to talk to Sano but is interrupted by Tamami so she goes for a walk instead. She is grabbed by two perverts so Sano rushes to save her, but she is saved by Makita first, deliberately aggravating Sano. That night she and Sano both apologise for arguing but he realises he still has to protect her as she is still hopelessly naïve with no instinct for danger. Makita confronts Sano, demanding an honest conversation.
9	9	"Can Things Stay This Way?"; Transliteration: "Kono Mamade Īno?" (Japanese: このままでいいの？)	Kazuya Ishikuri	Kazuya Ishikuri	March 1, 2026
Tamami is frustrated Sano won't pay her any attention. Mizuki realises by getting to know Sano as a boy she probably won't ever confess to him. After getting wet playing with Kyomi in the pool, Mizuki changes clothes but is seen naked by Io and forced to admit everything. Io warns her she can't keep lying indefinitely. Later, Makita takes Mizuki shopping but tries to rape her. Having been suspicious anyway, Sano follows them and beats up Makita. Due to running away in a panic, Mizuki and Sano fall partway down a cliff, spraining Mizuki's ankle. Mizuki admits it was her fault for not believing anyone about Makita. Sano realises Mizuki has another fever and when she becomes delirious he is forced to help her drink water via a kiss. With Yujiro's help, Nakatsu locates them quickly. The next morning Makita quits his job and disappears. Mizuki vaguely remembers Sano's kiss but can't decide if it was real or her delirium. As it is time to go home everyone prepares to leave the boarding house. The usually stoic Kyomi cries, revealing she has become attached to Nakatsu, so he promises to see her again. Tamami refuses to say goodbye, causing Mizuki to guess she confessed to Sano but was rejected.
10	10	"I Don't Look Good In Women's Clothing!"; Transliteration: "Josō Nanka Niawanai yo!" (Japanese: 女装なんか似合わないよ！)	Shigeru Ueda	Mitsuru Sasaki	March 8, 2026
School festival arrives and Mizuki learns dormitories compete to win special privileges. Nanba is challenged by Megumi, leader of Dorm 1 along with his subordinates Kitahanada and Kujo. Nanba announces one activity is a cross-dressing beauty pageant. Sano worries when Mizuki signs up to the Chicken Fight event without knowing what it is. She is also pressured into the beauty pageant. Megumi reveals Kadoma, a pretty boy from Dorm 1, will enter the pageant. Megumi decides to enter the Chicken Fight and defeat Mizuki. Io visits with a reinforced vest for Mizuki to hide her larger breasts. Sano and his team win at basketball but Dorm 1 win two swimming events. Kujo stares at Mizuki, worrying her as he is notorious for violence. Mizuki and her team lose at volleyball. Dorm 3's leader, Himejima, asks Mizuki to transfer to Dorm 3 but is sent away by Nakatsu. Nanba wins the Cheer event. Mizuki and Nakatsu win the 500m relay, putting their dorm in second place behind Dorm 1. Mizuki sees Nanba with an upset woman and wonders what was happening. Members of Dorm 1, having seen Mizuki in the 500m relay, decide to injure her in the Chicken Fight so she can't compete in the 2000m relay.
11	11	"Nanba-Senpai?"; Transliteration: "Nanba-senpai?" (Japanese: 難波先輩？)	Kōhei Kamiya	Ichizō Kobayashi	March 15, 2026
Mizuki is deliberately knocked to the ground during the Chicken Fight but is caught by Sano and Nakatsu. Mizuki suspects Kujo arrange it, but doesn't tell Sano. Mizuki's class cross-dresses while running the café. The boys from before contemplate other ways of making sure Mizuki misses the 2000m relay. Mizuki accidentally eavesdrops on Nanba and the woman again. Umeda reveals the woman was Nanba's girlfriend but broke up with him without explanation. The woman leaves and Nanba is embarrassed Mizuki overheard their fight. He admits seeing her again made him realise he still loves her, only to be heartbroken again as she is now engaged. Sano eavesdrops on them and isn't happy. Nanba catches Nihonbashi distributing pictures of him when he cross-dressed as a first year, so as punishment he forces Nihonbashi to cross-dress. Dorm 3's haunted house outperforms the café, leaving Dorm 2 in last place with only one day remaining. Sano becomes angry at Mizuki. Umeda explains Sano might be jealous of Nanba. He also warns Mizuki something will have to change between her and Sano. Sano apologises for his bad mood. Someone tries to drop a flowerpot on Mizuki, scaring her. Megumi apologises for the student who attacked her during the Chicken Fight as it was unsportsmanlike. Kujo however, hints he arranged the flowerpot incident.
12	12	"I Was The Same"; Transliteration: "Ore mo Sōdatta Mono" (Japanese: おれもそうだったもの)	Shigeru Ueda	Daisuke Kurose	March 22, 2026
Mizuki has a nightmare about Kujo so the half-asleep Sano pulls her into his bed, only for Nakatsu to catch them next morning. Nakatsu overhears it was members of dorm 1 who threw the flowerpot to scare Mizuki, so he warns Sano. Kadoma lures Mizuki away to be kidnapped. Sano accuses Kujo, but a regretful Kadoma admits Kujo actually had nothing to do with it. Furious at Kitahanda's cheating, Kujo joins Nakao, Nakatsu and Sano as they find Mizuki and beat up the kidnappers. As Mizuki, Nakao and Kadoma missed the beauty pageant an anonymous entrant from dorm 3 is declared winner, revealed to be Nihonbashi. Kujo informs Megumi of Kitahanda's cheating, so Megumi apologises to Mizuki and Kujo expels the kidnappers from the karate team. Mizuki apologises for suspecting Kujo but his staring made him seem suspicious. Megumi reveals Kujo is karate obsessed and often stares at people he thinks has potential. Nakatsu reveals he sprained an ankle beating up the kidnappers, so he can't run the 2000m relay. Nanba decides to replace him, and together with Mizuki they win the relay and gain enough points for dorm 2 to win the entire festival. Sano almost confesses to Mizuki but decides not to.

===== Season 2 (2026) =====
No. overall	No. in season	Title	Directed by	Storyboarded by	Original release date
13	1	"Definitely Weird"; Transliteration: "Zettai Hendayo" (Japanese: 絶対変だよ)	Hong Pei Ni	Ichizō Kobayashi	July 2, 2026
14	2	"Please Make Me Stronger!"; Transliteration: "Tsuyoku Shitekudasai!" (Japanese: 強くしてください！)	Chen Xiao Can	Chen Xiao Can	July 9, 2026
15	3	"How Did You Know?!"; Transliteration: "Nande Wakatta no!?" (Japanese: なんでわかったの！？)	Yūta Mikami	Yūta Mikami	July 16, 2026
16	4	"I'll Wait"; Transliteration: "Mattete Ageru" (Japanese: 待っててあげる)	Yūichi Satō	Tetsuya Takahashi	July 23, 2026
17	5	"I Can't Not Think About It"; Transliteration: "Ishiki Shichau" (Japanese: 意識しちゃう)	Kinya Nakamura	Tetsuya Takahashi	July 30, 2026
18	6	"It's Fine, Right?"; Transliteration: "Daijōbuda yo ne?" (Japanese: 大丈夫だよね？)	Kazuya Ishiguri	Ichizō Kobayashi	August 6, 2026
19	7	"Because I Want to Stay By Your Side Forever"; Transliteration: "Zutto Soba ni Itaikara" (Japanese: ずっとそばにいたいから)	Yūya Tanaka	Ichizō Kobayashi	August 13, 2026
20	8	"Teacher's Boyfriend?"; Transliteration: "Sensei no Kareshi?" (Japanese: 先生のカレシ？)	Claire Barbou des Courières	Hiroshi Hara	August 20, 2026
21	9	"Don't Look!!"; Transliteration: "Micha Dame!!" (Japanese: 見ちゃダメ!!)	Shigeru Ueda	Kiyotaka Ōhata	August 27, 2026
22	10	"Did You Do It?!"; Transliteration: "Kimi ga Yatta no ka!?" (Japanese: 君がやったのか!?)	Natsuki Takemura & Yūya Tanaka	Natsuki Takemura & Nozomi Wakabayashi	September 3, 2026
23	11	"What Do You Want?"; Transliteration: "Hoshīmono tte nani?" (Japanese: 欲しいものってなに？)	Pei Ni Hong	Ōki Maesawa	September 10, 2026
24	12	"It Can't Be Helped"; Transliteration: "Shikatanai yo ne" (Japanese: 仕方ないよね)	Kinya Nakamura	Atsushi Ōtsuki	September 17, 2026
25	13	"I'm So Happy!"; Transliteration: "Suggoku Shiawase!" (Japanese: すっごく幸せ！)	Shigeru Ueda	Shigeru Ueds, Natsuki Takemura & Nozomi Wakabayashi	September 24, 2026

=== Stage play ===
A stage play adaptation was also announced on November 7, 2026 to commemorate the manga's 30th anniversary. It will run in Osaka on February 13-15, 2027, in Aichi on February 18-19 and in Tokyo on March 13-22.

== Reception ==
The series sold over 17 million copies in Japan. The English release of Volume 6 was ranked ninth in the Bookscan chart, while Volume 9 came in fifth as one of the top-selling graphic novels in North America 6 months later. The English release of the series' first two volumes were nominated under the Graphic Novel category of The Quills Awards in 2005. The series came in third place for Top Shōjo Manga in Singapore in February 2007. According to Tohan, aizōban volumes 11 and 12 ranked sixth place for the week of September 12, 2007.

The English release of Volume 17 was ranked eighth in the Publishers Weekly Comics Bestseller list. The 23rd volume of Hana-Kimi was released by Viz Media on April 1, 2008, and was ranked fifth in the monthly Top 20 Graphic Novels rankings for the period between March 31 to April 27, 2008.

The total sales for the series' Japanese volumes came in fifth after Death Note in the ranking of the most read series throughout 2007. The series ranked 37th place in Matt Blind's Top 300 series in 2008, and was later chosen as one of the series for School Library Journal's Good Comics for Kids Summer Reading Challenge in 2009.

Maria Lin noted that although she normally disliked female protagonists in manga, she praised Mizuki as an exception, crediting her with lifting the manga above other "pretty boy manga", enjoying her "never-give-up attitude". Moreover, Lin enjoyed the art style but she found the male characters' designs sometimes generic. By Volume 4 and 5, even with the increase in cast characters, Lin felt that the storyline was still coherent despite this.

Sheena McNeil felt that the premise was "shallow", but upon reading, found herself "caught up in the story". McNeil praised the art, citing its importance in a story of deception, enjoying the "gorgeous" character designs, but appreciating the departure from strict aesthetics for humor.

Liann Cooper felt that Hana-Kimi was one of Viz's most important shōjo properties due to its combination of humor, angst and the artwork, but criticized their cover design.

Kat Avila found she enjoyed Hana-Kimi better than Girl Got Game, due to Volume 4's humor and attractive male characters.
