= The Film 3 =

2025 video album by Yoasobi

Video by Yoasobi
- Released: October 1, 2025
- Recorded: November 10, 2024 – June 9, 2025
- Venue: Tokyo Dome (Tokyo); Singapore Indoor Stadium (Singapore); Wembley Arena (London)
- Length: 401:00
- Language: Japanese
- Label: Echoes; Sony Japan

Yoasobi video chronology
The Film 2 (2024)	The Film 3 (2025)

The Film 3 is the third video album by Japanese duo Yoasobi. It was released on Blu-ray exclusively by Echoes and Sony Music Entertainment Japan on October 1, 2025, the duo's sixth anniversary. Similar to its predecessors The Film (2022) and The Film 2 (2024), the video album features of Yoasobi's selected live performances from 2024 to 2025, consisting of the final Tokyo Dome show of the Chō-genjitsu Dome Live, the Chō-genjitsu Asia Tour in Singapore, and the one-off concert at Wembley Arena in London.

== Background and release ==
On July 12, 2025, Yoasobi announced their third video album, titled The Film 3, set to be released on October 1, coinciding with the duo's sixth anniversary. Initially, the duo revealed that the Blu-ray discs would conprise the footage of the final show of the Chō-genjitsu Dome Live at Tokyo Dome in November 2024, and undisclosed selected performances, as well as the concerts' documentary, behind-the-scenes, and binder-styled photobook. On September 10, the two other concerts included on the Blu-ray were unveiled: the Singapore show of Chō-genjitsu Asia Tour on January 23, 2025, and the one-off concert at OVO Arena Wembley, London on June 9.

== Promotion ==
Ahead of the release, Yoasobi uploaded the trailer for The Film 3 on September 25. To promote the video album, since September 30, the duo held a panel exhibition, displaying photographs taken at the concerts and unreleased behind-the-scenes footage at 41 CD shops throughout Japan. The duo also exhibited the costumes they wore at the Chō-genjitsu Dome Live at three Tower Records Japan shops: Shibuya, Nagoya Kintetsu Pass'e, and Umeda NU Chayamachi. The duo uploaded a live performances of "Seventeen" at the Chō-genjitsu Dome Live via YouTube on September 30, "Monotone" at the Wembley Arena the next day, and, although they were not included on the video album, "Biri-Biri" with NewJeans and "Tabun" with AKMU's Lee Su-hyun at the Incheon shows on October 7.

== Track listing ==
All tracks are written by Ayase.

Disc 1 – Chō-genjitsu Dome Live (November 10, 2024)
No.	Title	Length
1.	"Seventeen"
2.	"Shukufuku"
3.	"Kaibutsu"
4.	"Undead"
5.	"Halzion"
6.	"Suki da"
7.	"Mō Sukoshi Dake"
8.	"Umi no Manimani"
9.	"Yasashii Suisei"
10.	"Tabun"
11.	"Haruka"
12.	"New Me"
13.	"Yūsha"
14.	"Ano Yume o Nazotte"
15.	"Sangenshoku"
16.	"Idol"
17.	"Monotone"
18.	"Encore"
19.	"Heart Beat"
20.	"Loveletter"
21.	"Adventure"
22.	"Tsubame"
23.	"Gunjō"
24.	"Butai ni Tatte" (encore)
25.	"Yoru ni Kakeru" (encore)

Disc 1 – Chō-genjitsu Asia Tour in Singapore (February 23, 2025)
No.	Title	Length
26.	"Seventeen"
27.	"Shukufuku"
28.	"Undead"
29.	"New Me"
30.	"Suki da"
31.	"Mō Sukoshi Dake"
32.	"Halzion"
33.	"Tabun"
34.	"Monotone"
35.	"Yasashii Suisei"
36.	"Kaibutsu"
37.	"Yūsha"
38.	"Ano Yume o Nazotte"
39.	"Idol"
40.	"Heart Beat"
41.	"Gunjō"
42.	"Butai ni Tatte" (encore)
43.	"Yoru ni Kakeru" (encore)

Disc 2 – OVO Arena Wembley in London (June 9, 2025)
No.	Title	Length
1.	"Seventeen"
2.	"Shukufuku"
3.	"Undead"
4.	"Players"
5.	"Suki da"
6.	"Halzion"
7.	"Watch Me!"
8.	"Tabun"
9.	"Monotone"
10.	"Yasashii Suisei"
11.	"Kaibutsu"
12.	"Yūsha"
13.	"Ano Yume o Nazotte"
14.	"Idol"
15.	"Heart Beat"
16.	"Gunjō"
17.	"Butai ni Tatte" (encore)
18.	"Yoru ni Kakeru" (encore)

Disc 2 – Yoasobi Live Documentary
No.	Title	Length
19.	"2024.10-11 Yoasobi 5th Anniversary Dome Live 2024 'Chō-genjitsu'"
20.	"2024.12-2025.2 Yoasobi Asia Tour 2024-2025 'Chō-genjitsu'"
21.	"2025.6 Yoasobi Live at OVO Arena Wembley"
Total length:		401:00

== Charts ==
Chart performance for The Film 3
Chart (2025)	Peak position
Japanese Blu-ray Disc (Oricon)	2
Japanese Music DVD and Blu-ray (Oricon)	3

== Release history ==
Release dates and formats for The Film 3
Region	Date	Format	Label	Ref.
Japan	October 1, 2025	Blu-ray	Echoes; Sony Japan	
