= Super Planet Tour =

2026–2027 concert tour by Yoasobi

- Tour by Yoasobi
- Japan promotional poster
- Location: Asia; Oceania
- Associated albums: The Book For,
- Start date: October 24, 2026
- End date: April 17, 2027
- Legs: 2
- No. of shows: 18
- Website: Official website

Yoasobi concert chronology
- Never Ending Stories Tour (2026); Super Planet Tour (2026–2027)

The Super Planet Tour (Japanese: 超惑星, Hepburn: Chō-wakusei; officially titled 11-City Asia-Oceania Tour 2026–2027 "Super Planet") is the ongoing ninth concert tour by Japanese duo Yoasobi. The tour comprises 18 shows in 11 cities, commenced in Osaka, Japan on October 24, 2026, and will conclude in Goyang, South Korea on April 17, 2027.

== Background and ticketing ==
On November 30, 2025, during the final show of their Wandara Hall Tour at Okinawa Convention Center in Ginowan, Okinawa, Yoasobi announced the concert tour, tentatively titled Asia 10-City Dome & Stadium Tour 2026–2027. Described as the biggest tour in the duo's career, the concerts will be held in five cities in Japan: Osaka, Nagoya, Sapporo, Fukuoka, and Tokyo, and five other cities in Asia: Taipei, Seoul, Hong Kong, Singapore, and one undisclosed city. On January 1, 2026, the duo revealed the dates and venues for the Japan leg. Ticket pre-sales for official fan club pre-sale for the Japan leg began on January 4. A serial number for the advance ticket lottery entry for the Japan leg was included on the duo's fourth EP, The Book For,.

On July 31, 2026, Yoasobi unveiled the tour's official title, Asia 10-City Dome & Stadium Tour 2026–2027 "Super Planet", alongside its promotional poster and 3D-like-designed merchandise. The title embodies "[their] desire to create a landscape that transcends conventional wisdom and imagination," and "no one has ever seen before," by using the duo's music to "encounter new worlds one after another," like "travel through space from star to star." In August, the dates and venues for Singapore and Taipei shows were announced, set to hold in early 2027; the duo will be the first Japanese act to headline a solo concert at Singapore National Stadium and Taipei Dome.

On November 9, Yoasobi announced the dates and venues (except venue for South Korea show) for the remaining Asian shows and two additional shows in Melbourne and Sydney, Australia, and renamed the tour "11-City Asia-Oceania Tour 2026–2027 'Super Planet' ". The duo said they cancelled previously planned shows in some countries and venues after discussions in light of "the current situation". The venue for South Korea show was revealed later on November 16, being Goyang Stadium.

== Marketing ==
On September 12, Yoasobi revealed the tour's official merchandise. To commemorate the tour, the duo launched a promotional project, "Tekuteku Yoasobi", to partner with local businesses in Japan, consisting of beika manufacturer Mochikichi, FBS's radio show Jimoto Kensho Variety: Fukuoka-kun, Zen-Noh's Mikan 100 Japanese mandarin juice, amusement store chain Round1, Nagoya-based ZIP-FM radio station, Wakasaimo Honpo's Hokkaido An Potato, Masuya's onigiri senbei pocketable bag, café St. Moritz, etc. Other partnerships include Kyōto Station building and Aoao Sapporo. On October 17, Ikura surprisingly held her first street performance in eight years ahead of the concert in Sapporo at Soseigawa Park. She performed "Yoru ni Kakeru", "Sakihokore", and "Ano Yume o Nazotte".

== Setlist ==
This setlist is representative of the shows in Osaka on October 24, 2026. It is not intended to represent all shows.

1. "Shukufuku"
2. "Undead"
3. "Kaibutsu"
4. "Taishō Roman"
5. "Gekijō"
6. "Killa"
7. "Players"
8. "Loveletter"
9. "Yasashii Suisei"
10. "Baby"
11. "Encore"
12. "Orion"
13. "Yūsha"
14. "Heart Beat"
15. "Ano Yume o Nazotte"
16. "Seventeen"
17. "Idol"
18. "Adventure"
19. "Tsubame"
20. "Sakihokore"

Encore

21. "Watch Me!"
22. "Gunjō"
23. "Killa"
24. "Yoru ni Kakeru"

== Shows ==
List of 2026 concerts, showing date, city, country, and venue
Date (2026)	City	Country	Venue
October 24	Osaka	Japan	Kyocera Dome Osaka
October 25	Osaka	Japan	Kyocera Dome Osaka
November 7	Nagoya	Japan	Vantelin Dome Nagoya
November 8	Nagoya	Japan	Vantelin Dome Nagoya
November 14	Sapporo	Japan	Daiwa House Premist Dome
November 15	Sapporo	Japan	Daiwa House Premist Dome
November 28	Fukuoka	Japan	Mizuho PayPay Dome Fukuoka
November 29	Fukuoka	Japan	Mizuho PayPay Dome Fukuoka
December 5	Tokyo	Japan	Tokyo Dome
December 6	Tokyo	Japan	Tokyo Dome

List of 2027 concerts, showing date, city, country, and venue
Date (2027)	City	Country	Venue
January 9	Taipei	Taiwan	Taipei Dome
January 10	Taipei	Taiwan	Taipei Dome
January 21	Hong Kong	China	AsiaWorld–Arena
January 22	Hong Kong	China	AsiaWorld–Arena
February 20	Singapore		Singapore National Stadium
March 17	Melbourne	Australia	Rod Laver Arena
March 19	Sydney	Australia	Afterpay Arena
April 17	Goyang	South Korea	Goyang Stadium

== Personnel ==
Yoasobi

- Ayase – keyboard, synthesizer, sampler
- Ikura – vocals

Band

- Sota Morimitsu – bandmaster, bass guitar
- Ash – guitar
- Ena Suzuki – keyboard
- Hiroki Oono – drums
- Kazuya Oi – electronic drums

Others

- Yuya Haryu – orchestral arrangement
