= Chō-genjitsu Asia Tour =

2024–2025 concert tour by Yoasobi

- Tour by Yoasobi
- Promotional poster
- Location: Asia
- Start date: December 7, 2024
- End date: February 27, 2025
- Duration: c. 90 minutes
- Legs: 1
- No. of shows: 14
- Guests: NewJeans (Incheon); AKMU (Incheon)
- Attendance: 140,000

Yoasobi concert chronology
- Chō-genjitsu Dome Live (2024–2024); Chō-genjitsu Asia Tour (2024–2025); Yoasobi Live at Wembley Arena (2025)

The Chō-genjitsu Asia Tour (超現実; lit. 'Surrealism'; officially titled Yoasobi Asia Tour 2024–2025 "Chō-genjitsu") was the third overseas concert tour and sixth overall by Japanese duo Yoasobi. Comprising fourteen shows, the tour began in Incheon, South Korea on December 7, 2024, and concluded in Jakarta, Indonesia on February 27, 2025, for 140,000 audiences.

== Background and ticket sales ==
Yoasobi embarked on their first Asia tour between late 2023 and early 2024, visiting seven cities in Asia. Throughout 2024, the duo attended several musics festival in Asia: Bubbling Boiling Music & Arts Festival and Dream Future Kiloglow Music Festival in China, Weverse Con Festival in South Korea, and Summer Sonic Bangkok in Thailand. Prior to the announcement, in mid August, it was reported that Shanghai Municipal Administration of Culture and Tourism granted permission for Yoasobi to hold concerts at the Mercedes-Benz Arena on February 15 and 16, 2025. On August 26, Yoasobi formally announced the second Asia tour, visiting Incheon, Hong Kong, Bangkok, Taipei, Shanghai, Singapore, and Jakarta between December 7, 2024 and February 27, 2025. The official title of the tour "Chō-genjitsu", the same as the previous dome tour, was unveiled on October 29.

News outlets reported that the Hong Kong shows' tickets were sold out in one second, while the two Incheon shows in one minute. On November 21, Yoasobi announced guest appearances for Incheon shows, which would be NewJeans on December 7 and AKMU the next day. Pop-up stores opened at The Hyundai Seoul in collaboration with clothing brand Heights and illustrator Kitti Ri; and Airside, Hong Kong. Following Yoon Suk Yeol's martial law declaration on December 3, Yoasobi confirmed that the concerts in South Korea would proceed as scheduled. The footages of the second Singapore show was later included on Yoasobi's third video album The Film 3, released in October 2025.

== Setlist ==
This set list is representative of the shows in Hong Kong on December 26, 2024. It is not intended to represent all shows.

1. "Seventeen"
2. "Shukufuku"
3. "Undead"
4. "Halzion"
5. "Mr." (day 1) / "Suki da" (day 2)
6. "Mō Sukoshi Dake"
7. "Tabun"
8. "New Me"
9. "Monotone"
10. "Yasashii Suisei"
11. "Kaibutsu"
12. "Yūsha"
13. "Ano Yume o Nazotte"
14. "Idol"
15. "Heart Beat"
16. "Gunjō"

Encore

17. "Butai ni Tatte"
18. "Yoru ni Kakeru"

Notes

- For Incheon shows, "Heart Beat" was not performed and guests appeared between "Yasashii Suisei" and "Kaibutsu".
  - Day 1: NewJeans performed "How Sweet", "Right Now", and "Biri-Biri"; the latter two with Ikura.
  - Day 2: Lee Su-hyun and Yoasobi sung "Tabun", which was moved to perform after "Yasashii Suisei"; AKMU solely performed "Dinosaur", and "Love Lee", which Ikura joined the latter song.
- Starting in Shanghai, "Halzion" and "New Me" were switched.
- For Shanghai show, "Ano Yume o Nazotte" was performed between "Tabun" and "New Me".

== Shows ==
List of 2024 concerts, showing date, city, country, venue, guest and attendance
Date (2024)	City	Country	Venue	Guest(s)	Attendance
December 7	Incheon (Note: Promoted as Seoul)	South Korea	Inspire Arena	NewJeans	26,000
December 8	Incheon	South Korea	Inspire Arena	AKMU	26,000
December 26	Hong Kong	China	AsiaWorld–Arena	—N/a	—
December 27	Hong Kong	China	AsiaWorld–Arena	—N/a	—

List of 2025 concerts, showing date, city, country, venue and attendance
Date (2025)	City	Country	Venue	Attendance
January 25	Bangkok	Thailand	BITEC Live	—
January 26	Bangkok	Thailand	BITEC Live	—
February 8	Taipei	Taiwan	Taipei Arena	24,000
February 9	Taipei	Taiwan	Taipei Arena	24,000
February 15	Shanghai	China	Mercedes-Benz Arena	20,000
February 16	Shanghai	China	Mercedes-Benz Arena	20,000
February 22	Singapore		Singapore Indoor Stadium	20,000
February 23	Singapore		Singapore Indoor Stadium	20,000
February 26	Jakarta	Indonesia	Istora Senayan	—
February 27	Jakarta	Indonesia	Istora Senayan	—
Total				140,000

== Personnel ==
Yoasobi

- Ayase – keyboard, synthesizer, sampler
- Ikura – vocals

Other performers

- NewJeans – guest (Incheon day 1)
- AKMU – guest (Incheon day 2)

Band

- AssH – guitar (Incheon, Hong Kong, Bangkok)
- Satoru Taguchi – guitar (Taipei, Singapore, Jakarta)
- Sōta Morimitsu – bass
- Kazuya Ōi – drums (Incheon)
- Tatsuya Amano – drums (Hong Kong, Taipei, Singapore, Jakarta)
- Hiroki Oono – drums (Bangkok)
- Ena Suzuki – keyboard (Hong Kong, Bangkok, Taipei, Singapore, Jakarta)
- Shōko Nagasaki – keyboard (Incheon)
