= Never Ending Stories Tour =

2026 concert tour by Yoasobi

- Tour by Yoasobi
- Promotional poster
- Location: North America
- Associated albums: E-Side 4
- Start date: July 31, 2026
- End date: August 16, 2026
- Legs: 1
- No. of shows: 8
- Attendance: 70,000
- Website: Official website

Yoasobi concert chronology
- Wandara Hall Tour (2026); Never Ending Stories Tour (2026); Super Planet Tour (2026–2027)

The Never Ending Stories Tour (officially Yoasobi North America Tour 2026 "Never Ending Stories") was the fourth overseas concert tour and eighth overall by Japanese duo Yoasobi. The tour commenced on July 31, 2026, at the Osheaga Festival in Montreal, Canada, and concluded on August 16 in Los Angeles, the United States, which amassed 70,000 attendees

== Background and marketing ==
In early 2026, Yoasobi was confirmed to perform in two North American music festivals—Osheaga Festival in Montreal, Canada on July 31; and Lollapalooza in Chicago, the United States on August 2. On April 15, 2026, the duo announced the North America concert tour, titled Never Ending Stories, alongside their English-language EP, E-Side 4. The tour's regular shows is scheduled to begin in Boston on August 4 and conclude in Los Angeles on the 16th, and includes the festival date of Osheaga and Lollapalooza. The duo became the first Japanese act to perform at historic Hollywood Bowl.

The tour's title, Never Ending Stories, reflects the duo's slogan "novel into music", aiming to "deliver their stories to North America and connect them to the future." The Crunchyroll ticket pre-sales went on April 21, and followed by the artist's pre-sales the next day and general sales the next two days. The tour's official key visual was revealed on June 5. The duo collaborated with Complex for a pop-up store in Los Angeles on August 18 and 19.

== Setlist ==
This set list is representative of the shows in Los Angeles on August 16, 2026. It is not intended to represent all shows.

1. "Idol"
2. "Shukufuku"
3. "Undead"
4. "Players"
5. "Biri-Biri"
6. "Watch Me!"
7. "Baby"
8. "Tabun"
9. "Halzion"
10. "Suki da"
11. "Yasashii Suisei"
12. "Orion"
13. "Yūsha"
14. "Kaibutsu"
15. "Seventeen"
16. "Ano Yume o Nazotte"
17. "Butai ni Tatte"
18. "Gunjō"

Encore

19. "Adrena"
20. "Yoru ni Kakeru"

== Shows ==
List of concerts, showing date, city, country, and venue
Date (2026)	City	Country	Venue	Attendance
July 31 (Note: This concert is part of Osheaga Festival.)	Montreal	Canada	Parc Jean-Drapeau	—
August 2 (Note: This concert is part of Lollapalooza.)	Chicago	United States	Grant Park	—
August 4	Boston	United States	TD Garden	—
August 6	New York City (Note: Labelled as Brooklyn in promotional material.)	United States	Barclays Center	—
August 8	Hamilton	Canada	TD Coliseum	—
August 12	Seattle	United States	Climate Pledge Arena	—
August 14	Oakland	United States	Oakland Arena	—
August 16	Los Angeles	United States	Hollywood Bowl	—
Total				70,000

== Personnel ==
Yoasobi

- Ayase – keyboard, synthesizer, sampler
- Ikura – vocals

Band

- Ash – guitar
- Sota Morimitsu – bass guitar
- Ena Suzuki – keyboard
- Hiroki Oono – drums
