= The Film 2 =

2024 video album by Yoasobi

Video by Yoasobi
- Released: April 10, 2024
- Recorded: June 4, 2023 – January 26, 2024
- Venue: Saitama Super Arena (Saitama); Tiger Dome (Seoul); Zepp Haneda (Tokyo); Brookside at the Rose Bowl (Pasadena)
- Length: 314:00
- Language: Japanese
- Label: Sony Japan
- Director: Masamichi Shimizu (T-S-ing)

Yoasobi video chronology
The Film (2022)	The Film 2 (2024)	The Film 3 (2025)

The Film 2 is the second video album by Japanese duo Yoasobi. It was released on Blu-ray exclusively on April 10, 2024, through Sony Music Entertainment Japan. Similar to the previous The Film (2022), the video album contains the selected 2023–2024 live performances from three concert tours—the Denkōsekka Arena Tour in Saitama, the Asia Tour 2023–2024 in Seoul, and the Pop Out Zepp Tour in Tokyo—as well as their documentary about the tours. Commercially, The Film 2 topped the Oricon Blu-ray Disc Chart with 16,751 copies.

== Background and promotion ==
On January 25, 2024, at the first show of their Pop Out Zepp Tour, Yoasobi announced their second video album, titled The Film 2, alongside their fifth anniversary Dome Live 2024 (later the title was changed to Chō-genjitsu). Scheduled to be released on April 10, it was initially unveiled that comprised footage of the Denkōsekka Arena Tour at Saitama Super Arena on June 4, 2023, and two other concerts, as well as behind-the-scenes.

On March 19, the duo revealed additional contents, which are the performances of their Asia Tour 2023–2024 at Tiger Dome, Korea University, Seoul, South Korea, on December 17, 2023, and the Pop Out Zepp Tour at Zepp Haneda, Tokyo on January 26, 2024, as well as a behind-the-scene documentary at the Denkosekka Arena Tour, the 2023 Head in the Clouds Festival at Pasadena, California, the United States, and the first Asia Tour.

To commemorate the release, costumes Yoasobi wore and megaphone used by Ikura, and selected photos taken at the live performances were displayed as an exhibition at selected record shops in Japan between April 9 and 15. They also uploaded the performances of "Seventeen" and "Heart Beat" at Pop Out Zepp Tour, and "Gunjō" at the Asia Tour to promote the album.

== Track listing ==
All tracks are written by Ayase.

Disc 1 – Denkōsekka Arena Tour at Saitama Super Arena (June 4, 2023)
No.	Title	Length
1.	"Shukufuku"
2.	"Yoru ni Kakeru"
3.	"Sangenshoku"
4.	"Seventeen"
5.	"Mr."
6.	"Umi no Manimani"
7.	"Suki da"
8.	"Yasashii Suisei"
9.	"Moshi mo Inochi ga Egaketara"
10.	"Tabun"
11.	"Halzion"
12.	"Haruka"
13.	"Tsubame"
14.	"Kaibutsu"
15.	"Gunjō"
16.	"Idol" (encore)

Disc 1 – Yoasobi Asia Tour 2023–2024 at Tiger Dome (December 17, 2023)
No.	Title	Length
17.	"Yoru ni Kakeru"
18.	"Shukufuku"
19.	"Sangenshoku"
20.	"Seventeen"
21.	"Mr."
22.	"Biri-Biri"
23.	"Yasashii Suisei"
24.	"Yūsha"
25.	"Mō Sukoshi Dake"
26.	"Halzion"
27.	"Tabun"
28.	"Ano Yume o Nazotte"
29.	"Kaibutsu"
30.	"Gunjō"
31.	"Adventure"
32.	"Idol" (encore)

Disc 2 – Pop Out Zepp Tour at Zepp Haneda (January 26, 2024)
No.	Title	Length
1.	"Seventeen"
2.	"Shukufuku"
3.	"Halzion"
4.	"Taishō Roman"
5.	"Sangenshoku"
6.	"Tabun"
7.	"Biri-Biri"
8.	"Kaibutsu"
9.	"Moshi mo Inochi ga Egaketara"
10.	"Yasashii Suisei"
11.	"Tsubame"
12.	"Idol"
13.	"Yūsha"
14.	"Adventure"
15.	"Gunjō"
16.	"Heart Beat"
17.	"Yoru ni Kakeru" (encore)

Disc 2 – Yoasobi Live Documentary
No.	Title	Length
18.	"Yoasobi Arena Tour 2023 'Denkōsekka'"
19.	"Head in the Clouds Los Angeles"
20.	"Yoasobi Asia Tour 2023–2024"
Total length:		314:00

== Charts ==
Chart performance for The Film 2
Chart (2024)	Peak position
Japanese Blu-ray Disc (Oricon)	1
Japanese Music DVD and Blu-ray (Oricon)	2

== Release history ==
Release dates and formats for The Film 2
Region	Date	Format	Label	Ref.
Japan	April 10, 2024	Blu-ray	Sony Japan	
