= Wandara Hall Tour =

2025 concert tour by Yoasobi

- Tour by Yoasobi
- Promotional poster
- Location: Japan
- Start date: July 13, 2025
- End date: November 30, 2025
- Legs: 1
- No. of shows: 40
- Attendance: 75,000
- Website: Official website

Yoasobi concert chronology
- Yoasobi Live at Wembley Arena (2025); Wandara Hall Tour (2025); Never Ending Stories Tour (2026)

The Wandara Hall Tour (officially Yoasobi Hall Tour 2025 Wandara) was the fourth Japanese concert tour and seventh overall by Japanese duo Yoasobi. Focusing on small cities and venues in Japan rather than the big ones, the tour consists of 40 shows in 15 cities, commenced in Kumamoto on July 13, 2025, and was concluded in Ginowan on November 30, and attracted 75,000 attendees.

== Background and marketing ==
On November 11, 2024, Yoasobi announced their concert tour in Japan, tentatively titled Yoasobi Hall Tour 2025. The tour comprises 40 shows in 15 cities of 14 prefectures in Japan, where "they have never held solo shows before". The exclusive tickets for official fan club first went on November 13, 2024, and the second round came on April 19, 2025. The general ticket sales began on June 28.

On June 25, 2025, Yoasobi revealed the tour's official title, Wandara, taking from "wonderland", as the duo acted themselves as "a caravan travelling from town to town" to "deliver a wonderland-like excitement." Ryota Daimon illustrated the tour's official promotional poster, featuring three dogs in red, blue, and green, inspired by the similarity of "Wandara" and dog barking onomatopoeia. On July 4, the duo unveiled the tour's official merchandises, including a collaboration with arcade Vaultroom, as well as Wanpaku Matsuri at the venue's outside on selected date. The shows at Kumamoto and Ginowan shows also have a public screening outside the venues. The final show of the Wandara Hall Tour in Ginowan was available for streaming on Wowow on January 10, 2026.

During the tour, Yoasobi collaborated with numerous local businesses. On July 13, the first Kumamoto show, Kumamoto Prefecture's mascot Kumamon joined Yoasobi onstage for "Tsubame". On August 5, the duo surprisingly held a 500-drone show displaying messages for fans outside of Hondanomori Hokuden Hall for ten minutes following the show ended. Other partnerships include Samsung Galaxy S25 Ultra, the gold leaf manufacturer Katani Sangyō for Kanazawa shows, the Senbei company Masuya for Tsu shows, JR East for the shows in Tōhoku region, Nankai Electric Railway for the Wakayama shows, Shiawase Farm's Pâtisserrie Lait de Chèvre for Morioka shows, and the confectionery store Midorido for Yamaguchi shows, etc.

== Setlist ==
This set list is representative of the shows in Ginowan on November 29 and 30, 2025. It is not intended to represent all shows.

1. "Idol"
2. "Shukufuku"
3. "Undead" (day 2)
4. "Halzion" (day 1) / "Watch Me!" (day 2)
5. "Watch Me!" (day 1) / "Halzion"
6. "Loveletter" (acoustic) (day 1) / "Ano Yume o Nazotte" (acoustic) (day 2)
7. "Ano Yume o Nazotte" (acoustic) (day 1) / "Loveletter" (acoustic) (day 2)
8. "Monotone"
9. "Yasashii Suisei"
10. "Yūsha"
11. "Butai ni Tatte"
12. "Kaibutsu"
13. "Seventeen"
14. "Gunjō"
15. "Players"

Encore

16. "Gekijō"
17. "Kaishin no Ichigeki" (Radwimps cover) (day 1)
18. "Yoru ni Kakeru"

== Shows ==
List of concerts, showing date, city, country, venue, and attendance
Date (2025)	City (Note: Labelled as each prefecture the city located showing in promotional material.)	Country	Venue	Attendance
July 13	Kumamoto	Japan	Kumamoto-jō Hall	—
July 16	Kumamoto	Japan	Kumamoto-jō Hall	—
July 18	Kumamoto	Japan	Kumamoto-jō Hall	—
July 19	Kumamoto	Japan	Kumamoto-jō Hall	—
August 5	Kanazawa	Japan	Hondanomori Hokuden Hall	—
August 6	Kanazawa	Japan	Hondanomori Hokuden Hall	—
August 8	Kanazawa	Japan	Hondanomori Hokuden Hall	—
August 9	Kanazawa	Japan	Hondanomori Hokuden Hall	—
August 18	Shizuoka	Japan	Shimizu Culture Hall	—
August 19	Shizuoka	Japan	Shimizu Culture Hall	—
August 21	Shizuoka	Japan	Shimizu Culture Hall	—
August 22	Shizuoka	Japan	Shimizu Culture Hall	—
September 2	Niigata	Japan	Niigata Prefectural Civic Center	—
September 3	Niigata	Japan	Niigata Prefectural Civic Center	—
September 5	Niigata	Japan	Niigata Prefectural Civic Center	—
September 6	Niigata	Japan	Niigata Prefectural Civic Center	—
September 9	Tsu	Japan	Mie Cultural Center	—
September 11	Tsu	Japan	Mie Cultural Center	—
September 12	Tsu	Japan	Mie Cultural Center	—
September 17	Yonago	Japan	Yonago Convention Center	—
September 18	Yonago	Japan	Yonago Convention Center	—
September 25	Wakayama	Japan	Wakayama Prefectural Cultural Hall	—
September 27	Wakayama	Japan	Wakayama Prefectural Cultural Hall	—
September 28	Wakayama	Japan	Wakayama Prefectural Cultural Hall	—
October 10	Morioka	Japan	Tosai Classic Hall Iwate	—
October 11	Morioka	Japan	Tosai Classic Hall Iwate	—
October 16	Kurashiki	Japan	Kurashiki Civic Hall	—
October 17	Kurashiki	Japan	Kurashiki Civic Hall	—
October 24	Obihiro	Japan	Obihiro Cultural Hall	—
October 25	Obihiro	Japan	Obihiro Cultural Hall	—
October 27	Hakodate	Japan	Hakodate Citizen Hall	—
October 28	Hakodate	Japan	Hakodate Citizen Hall	—
October 30	Iwaki	Japan	Alios Iwaki Performing Arts Center	—
October 31	Iwaki	Japan	Alios Iwaki Performing Arts Center	—
November 12	Matsuyama	Japan	Matsuyama Civic Hall	—
November 13	Matsuyama	Japan	Matsuyama Civic Hall	—
November 15	Yamaguchi	Japan	KDDI Ishin Hall	—
November 16	Yamaguchi	Japan	KDDI Ishin Hall	—
November 29	Ginowan	Japan	Okinawa Convention Center	—
November 30	Ginowan	Japan	Okinawa Convention Center	—
Total				75,000

== Personnel ==
Yoasobi

- Ayase – keyboard, synthesizer, sampler
- Ikura – vocals

Band

- AssH – guitar
- Sota Morimitsu – bass
- Kazuya Ōi – drums (Kumamoto, Kanazawa, and Niigata day 3, and Matsuyama, Yamaguchi)
- Hiroki Oono – drums (Shizuoka, Niigata day 1–2, 4, Tsu, Yonago, Wakayama, Morioka, Kurashiki, Obihiro, Hakodate, Iwaki, and Ginowan)
- Ena Suzuki – keyboard (Kumamoto day 1–2, Kanazawa day 4 and later)
- Shōko Nagasaki – keyboard (Kumamoto day 3–4, and Kanazawa day 1–3)
