= Chō-genjitsu Dome Live =

2024 concert tour by Yoasobi

- Tour by Yoasobi
- Promotional poster
- Location: Japan
- Start date: October 26, 2024
- End date: November 10, 2024
- Legs: 1
- No. of shows: 4
- Attendance: 170,000
- Website: Official website

Yoasobi concert chronology
- Yoasobi Live in the USA (2024); Chō-genjitsu Dome Live (2024); Chō-genjitsu Asia Tour (2024–2025)

The Chō-genjitsu Dome Live (Japanese: 超現実; lit. 'surrealism'; officially titled Yoasobi 5th Anniversary Dome Live 2024 "Chō-genjitsu") was the third Japanese concert tour and fifth overall by Japanese duo Yoasobi for their fifth anniversary commemoration since the formation. Comprising four all-dome shows, it began in Osaka on October 26, 2024, and concluded in Tokyo on November 10, and amassed 170,000 attendees. The tour's accompanying concert film premiered in theaters on February 21, 2025, and its live album was released on November 4, 2026.

== Background and promotion ==
During their Pop Out Zepp Tour at Zepp Haneda on January 25, 2024, Yoasobi announced their upcoming concert tour, tentatively titled Dome Live 2024 to commemorate their fifth anniversary since their debut. It scheduled to hold on October 26 and 27 at Kyocera Dome Osaka and November 9 and 10 at Tokyo Dome. Tickets for official fan club members went on sale from January 25 to March 10; and lottery tickets went on sale from May 20 to June 10. On August 29, the official tour title, Chō-genjitsu, and promotional poster were revealed.

According to the duo, the tour title, meaning "surrealism", reflects on "the five years that have passed, and embodies the current Yoasobi that has emerged during that time." In a Sponichi Annex interview, the duo expressed the meaning behind of title: "We spent those strange days feeling like reality was distorted, so we want to bring something exciting and unusual to this reality."

The concert tour collaborated on promotional campaigns with local businesses: Namba Parks, Namba City, and Keihan Mall in Osaka and Miyashita Park in Tokyo. Sports Hochi published special newspapers, featuring Yoasobi on the front page, published on the concert dates at selected stores around Kyocera Dome Osaka and Tokyo Dome.

== Concert synopsis ==
The concert starts with the opening video, which is interspersed with footage from Yoasobi's past live performances, accompanied by an ominous sound effect overlaid with the announcement "Welcome to the surreal world" (超現実の世界へようこそ, Chō-genjitsu no sekai e yōkoso). The claws and eyes of a giant monster appear from a crack in the LED screens as "Seventeen" begins, followed by "Shukufuku". Then, the duo's silhouettes suddenly transform before moving on to "Kaibutsu". Finally, the entire stage comes into view, illuminated by pillars of fire rising from all over. The show moves to Yoasobi and the band members, while a strange monster wriggles in to cut in with their song "Undead".

Coupled with the urban background, Yoasobi sings "Halzion", "Mr." (first day) or "Suki da" (second day), and "Mō Sukoshi Dake". The sets changed to the seaside with vending machines and benches on the left side for "Umi no Manimani", and a starry sky for "Yasashii Suisei". After the documentary film looks back on the duo's activity, the reproduction of Ayase's temporary room at his sister's house, where he wrote Yoasobi's songs in their early career, is situated on the center platform, during which "Tabun" was performed. The duo performs "Haruka" and debuts the unreleased track "New Me". After the duo left the stage, the band members—Zacro Misohagi (keyboard), AssH (guitar), Honogumo (drums), and Hikaru Yamamoto (bass)—performed solo.

In the second part, Ayase calls Ikura to say that the show will begin. She appears wearing an elegant veil and continues to sing "Yūsha", the a cappella version of "Ano Yume o Nazotte", "Sangenshoku", and "Idol". "Monotone", "Encore", and "Heart Beat". On the second day of the Tokyo show, guitarist Satoru Taguchi and drummer Tatsuya Amano joined the stage before "Ano Yume o Nazotte". Marked as a "climax" of the concert, Yoasobi performed "Loveletter", where the duo is in a hot air balloon. In contrast, "Adventure" is performed in carts that leap off the stage in a festive atmosphere. The duo calls child dancers to go on the stage to perform "Tsubame" (Midories appears on the second day of the Tokyo show), before aiming to be the one with "Gunjō"; Ikura marches around the venue during the second verse. The concert concluded with the encore from "Butai ni Tatte" (which Ikura played the electric guitar) and "Yoru ni Kakeru".

== Setlist ==
This setlist is representative of the show in Osaka on October 26 and 27, 2024. It is not intended to represent all shows.

1. "Seventeen"
2. "Shukufuku"
3. "Kaibutsu"
4. "Undead"
5. "Halzion"
6. "Mr." (day 1) / "Suki da" (day 2)
7. "Mō Sukoshi Dake"
8. "Umi no Manimani"
9. "Yasashii Suisei"
10. "Tabun"
11. "Haruka"
12. "New Me"
13. "Yūsha"
14. "Ano Yume o Nazotte"
15. "Sangenshoku"
16. "Monotone"
17. "Encore"
18. "Heart Beat"
19. "Loveletter"
20. "Adventure"
21. "Tsubame"
22. "Idol"
23. "Gunjō"

Encore

24. "Butai ni Tatte"
25. "Yoru ni Kakeru"

Notes

- During the Tokyo shows, "Idol" was performed between "Sangenshoku" and "Monotone".

== Shows ==
List of concerts, showing date, city, country, venue and attendance
Date (2024)	City	Country	Venue	Attendance
October 26	Osaka	Japan	Kyocera Dome Osaka	70,000
October 27	Osaka	Japan	Kyocera Dome Osaka	70,000
November 9	Tokyo	Japan	Tokyo Dome	100,000
November 10	Tokyo	Japan	Tokyo Dome	100,000
Total				170,000

== Personnel ==
Yoasobi

- Ayase – keyboard, synthesizer, sampler
- Ikura – vocals

Other performers

- Midories – performer (Tokyo day 2)

Band

- Zacro Misohagi – keyboard chorus
- AssH – guitar
- Honogumo – drums
- Hikaru Yamamoto – bass
- Satoru Taguchi – guitar (Tokyo day 2)
- Tatsuya Amano – drums (Tokyo day 2)

== Concert film ==
Yoasobi 5th Anniversary Dome Live 2024 "Surrealism"
- Theatrical release poster
- Kanji: 劇場版 YOASOBI 5th ANNIVERSARY DOME LIVE 2024 "超現実"
- Revised Hepburn: Gekijōban Yoasobi Fifusu Anibāsarī Domu Raibu Nisennijūyon "Chō-genjitsu"
- Directed by: Junichi Hirayama
- Starring: Ayase; Ikura
- Music by: Yoasobi
- Production companies: Wowow; 19 Juke
- Distributed by: Wowow Films
- Release date: February 21, 2025
- Running time: 158 minutes
- Country: Japan
- Language: Japanese

A concert film of the Chō-genjitsu Dome Live, filmed on the final day's show at Tokyo Dome, premiered on Wowow on December 28, 2024, as part of the three-month special event to commemorate the duo's fifth anniversary. Yoasobi uploaded performances of "Undead", "Butai ni Tatte", "Monotone", and "New Me", filmed at Tokyo Dome from December 2024 to January 2025 via the duo's YouTube channel.

The theatrical edition of the concert film, titled Yoasobi 5th Anniversary Dome Live 2024 "Surrealism", which additionally included the tour's documentary, was announced on December 28, 2024. It was released by Wowow Films on February 21, 2025, in Japan, Hong Kong, Macau, South Korea, and Taiwan, simultaneously. The pre-screen event held one day before in selected 30 theaters in Japan. The performance of "Idol" at the show was uploaded on February 25, 2025, to promote the film. Yoasobi appeared for the stage greeting at Toho Cinemas in Hibiya, Tokyo on March 2.

The film was premiered in Thailand between July 17 and 27, 2025, as part of anime film festival Jamnime Matsuri 2025, at Major Cineplex Ratchayothin and SF Cinema MBK Center, and subsequently received regular release on August 21. The duo later included the concert's footages on the duo's third video album The Film 3, released on October 1, 2025, and preceded by the live performance of "Seventeen" at the tour on September 30. In support of the publication of the bunkobon edition of Hajimete no (2026), the live performances of "Umi no Manimani" and "Suki da" was uploaded in October 2026.

== Live album ==
Yoasobi 5th Anniversary Dome Live 2024 "Chō-genjitsu" at Tokyo Dome

Live album by Yoasobi
- Released: November 4, 2026
- Recorded: November 10, 2024
- Venue: Tokyo Dome
- Length: 110:00
- Language: Japanese
- Labels: Echoes; Sony Japan
- Producer: Ayase

Yoasobi chronology
The Book For, (2026)	Yoasobi 5th Anniversary Dome Live 2024 "Chō-genjitsu" at Tokyo Dome (2026)

Yoasobi announced a live album for the Chō-genjitsu Dome Live, titled Yoasobi 5th Anniversary Dome Live 2024 "Chō-genjitsu" at Tokyo Dome, on October 29, 2026. Recorded on November 10, 2024, the second and final show at Tokyo Dome, it was released on November 4 to digital music and streaming platforms.

=== Track listing ===
All tracks are written by Ayase.

Yoasobi 5th Anniversary Dome Live 2024 "Chō-genjitsu" at Tokyo Dome track listing
No.	Title	Length
1.	"Opening"	1:18
2.	"Seventeen"	3:38
3.	"Shukufuku"	3:29
4.	"Kaibutsu"	4:44
5.	"Undead"	3:35
6.	"Halzion"	3:20
7.	"Suki da"	3:43
8.	"Mō Sukoshi Dake"	3:45
9.	"Umi no Manimani"	4:58
10.	"Yasashii Suisei"	3:42
11.	"Tabun"	4:24
12.	"Haruka"	4:09
13.	"New Me"	3:42
14.	"Band Session"	3:42
15.	"Yūsha"	4:18
16.	"Ano Yume o Nazotte"	4:54
17.	"Sangenshoku"	4:29
18.	"Idol"	4:47
19.	"Monotone"	3:37
20.	"Encore"	4:42
21.	"Heart Beat"	5:41
22.	"Loveletter"	3:34
23.	"Adventure"	4:24
24.	"Tsubame"	3:40
25.	"Gunjō"	4:59
26.	"Butai ni Tatte"	3:53
27.	"Yoru ni Kakeru"	4:53
Total length:		110:00

Notes

- All tracks are noted as "Yoasobi 5th Anniversary Dome Live 2024 'Chō-genjitsu' ".

=== Charts ===
Chart performance for Yoasobi 5th Anniversary Dome Live 2024 "Chō-genjitsu" at Tokyo Dome
Chart (2026)	Peak position
Japanese Digital Albums (Oricon)	5
Japanese Hot Albums (Billboard Japan)	32
