= The Book For, =

- Standard cover

EP by Yoasobi
- Released: June 26, 2026
- Length: 42:26
- Language: Japanese
- Labels: Echoes; Sony Japan
- Producer: Ayase

Yoasobi chronology
E-Side 4 (2026)	The Book For, (2026)	Yoasobi 5th Anniversary Dome Live 2024 "Chō-genjitsu" at Tokyo Dome (2026)

Singles from The Book For,
- 1. "Biri-Biri" Released: November 18, 2023; 2. "Heart Beat" Released: December 26, 2023; 3. "Undead" Released: July 1, 2024; 4. "Butai ni Tatte" Released: July 26, 2024; 5. "Monotone" Released: October 1, 2024; 6. "New Me" Released: November 11, 2024; 7. "Players" Released: March 21, 2025; 8. "Watch Me!" Released: May 18, 2025; 9. "Gekijō" Released: October 2, 2025; 10. "Adrena" Released: January 4, 2026; 11. "Baby" Released: January 11, 2026; 12. "Orion" Released: June 26, 2026

The Book For, is the fourth Japanese-language EP (ninth overall) by Japanese duo Yoasobi. Released on June 26, 2026, through Echoes and Sony Music Entertainment Japan, it is the follow-up to the duo's third EP The Book 3 (2023), and served as the fourth and final installment of the "reading CD"-themed The Book series. The EP was solely written and produced by the member Ayase.

12 singles supported The Book For,, including RIAJ-certified singles—Monogatari: Off & Monster Season's theme song "Undead" and 2024 NHK's sport event theme "Butai ni Tatte"—and a collaborative track with Overwatch, "Orion". Commercially, the EP peaked at number seven on the Oricon Albums Chart and the Billboard Japan Hot Albums.

== Background ==
Yoasobi released their first three EPs with the concept of "reading CD" and a binder package—The Book, The Book 2 (both 2021), and The Book 3 (2023). Between November 2023 and January 2026, the duo released a series of singles, including Billboard Japan Hot 100 top-20 "Biri-Biri", commemorating the first anniversary of the role-playing video games Pokémon Scarlet and Violet (2022); "Undead" a theme for the original net animation Monogatari: Off & Monster Season (2024); "Butai ni Tatte" a theme for NHK's coverage of sports event broadcastings in 2024; and "Watch Me!", the first opening theme for the anime series Witch Watch (2025). On May 13, 2026, the video game Overwatch hinted at a collaboration with the duo via a screenshot of a text conversation between them.

== Music and lyrics ==
The Book For, opens with "Orion", which centers around the relationship between Overwatch characters Genji, Hanzo, and Kiriko by comparing to Orion's Belt. Musically, it is a "futuristic" drum and bass and futurecore track incorporated the sound of Japanese traditional string instrument koto. "Adrena", an upbeat pop song with comical sound and dizzying electronic sound, depicting the protagonist's exhilaration and confusion and "straightforward yet awkward" and unrelenting love to her love interest. The EDM-track, "Undead", talks about living the lives to the fullest in the present without being bound by the past or the future.

Next, "Players" is a PlayStation-esque electropop song that conveys a push in the real world and inspires hope for the future among PlayStation players. A pop song with obbligato melody, "Monotone" delicates "feelings toward loved ones." The song was inspired by the "relationships between people" that were shown in Fureru (2024), expressing loneliness and feelings of missing someone in one's own life. "Baby" is about the protagonist's emotional conflict between pure, straightforward, yet unspeakable love for a person.

For the second half, "Watch Me!", a bright J-pop and bubbly electropop song, focuses on Witch Watch character Nico Wakatsuki's pure romantic feelings for her childhood friend, Morihito Otogi. An electropop song with Pokémon-styled sound, "Biri-Biri" is about the bond between rivals, with the lyrics referred to the various Pokémon video games. "New Me" is a mid-tempo electropop with the theme of "a new rebirth of oneself", describing "the changes in the protagonist's state of mind as they move forward into new days while grappling with their own struggles."

"Heart Beat" expresses positive feelings and attitudes of trying new things to move forward despite the anxiety inside. A guitar rock song, "Butai ni Tatte" shows conflicts, excitements, struggles, and hopes that athletes face in their mind to take a courageous step forward, which compares to artist career. The EP concludes with "Gekijō", an electronic rock that depicts the emotional transition of a hopeless and tired-of-life protagonist, based on the theme of "the world is a stage, and all humans are actors."

== Release and promotion ==
On May 15, 2026, Yoasobi announced their fourth Japanese-language EP, titled The Book For, scheduled for release on June 26. The EP is the fourth and final installment of The Book series, combining "four" and "for" to express their desire to reach "everyone who receives this work." Its comma at the end represents the "continuing story of Yoasobi". Its pre-order available on the same day in formats of CD with a binder package and two overseas-exclusive vinyls: Overwatch edition, featuring Genji, Hanzo, and Kiriko; and Yoasobi Art edition, illustrated by Nina Ai. The Japanese LP edition was issued on July 31 with the same cover artwork as the Yoasobi Art edition, but a different color reminiscent of the night.

The duo revealed the track list for The Book For, on June 5, including the Overwatch collaborative track, titled "Orion", which had been confirmed before. Despite being labelled as an EP, it consists of 12 tracks of singles released since November 2023. In an interview with Music Natalie, Ayase said: "I wanted to keep it to 8 or 9 tracks, like before, but I could not find the right timing, and before I knew it, I had accumulated a lot of songs." The EP also contains 12 different original index for special binder for each store. To commemorate the release, between June 25 and July 1, an in-store campaign was held by receiving a special receipt with the duo's message and autograph. On the release date, the duo uploaded the EP's trailer video, and visited the Empire State Building to celebrate the release.

To promote the EP, Yoasobi appeared at the Platinum Live segment of a two-hour special CDTV Live! Live! for two consecutive weeks, on June 29 and July 6, to perform their songs, including debuting the performance of "Orion". It was filmed at Toyota Arena Tokyo with 600 fans. The footage of the Tokyo show of their Chō-genjitsu Dome Live was streamed on July 2 and 5 through TikTok. They held an exhibition, The Book of Scenes The Book 1–3 and The Book For, between July 24 and September 13 at New Gallery, Chiyoda, Tokyo. The duo give an interview with Music Natalie, Hypebeast, Anime Trending, Anime Corner, and Forbes, and featured on the covers for Weekly Lawson Ticket and Rockin'On Japan. Yoasobi embarked on their North America tour, Never Ending Stories, in August, including the shows at Osheaga Festival and Lollapalooza; as well as their dome tour in Japan and stadium tour in Asia, titled Super Planet. It will commence at Kyocera Dome, Osaka in October 2026 and conclude in 2027.

== Commercial performance ==
Upon its release, with three days of tracking, The Book For, debuted at number seven on the Oricon Albums Chart and the Combined Albums Chart issued on July 6, 2026, selling 21,836 CD copies. Additionally, the EP topped the Digital Albums Chart for four consecutive weeks. On its first week, it sold 2,842 digital sales in its first week and became their fourth album to top the chart since The Book 3 (2023). On the Billboard Japan, The Book For, entered the Hot Albums for chart issued on July 1 at number nine, before reached the peak at number seven the next two weeks. The EP earned 23,121 CDs and 2,263 downloads on its first week, landed at number eight on the Top Albums Sales and number one on the Download Albums for three consecutive weeks.

== Track listing ==
All tracks are written by Ayase, except where noted.

The Book For, track listing
No.	Title	Lyrics	Length
1.	"Orion" (オリオン)	Ayase; Konnie Aoki	3:26
2.	"Adrena" (アドレナ)		3:07
3.	"Undead"		3:02
4.	"Players"		3:21
5.	"Monotone" (モノトーン)		3:30
6.	"Baby"		3:52
7.	"Watch Me!"		3:05
8.	"Biri-Biri"		3:07
9.	"New Me"		3:27
10.	"Heart Beat"		5:34
11.	"Butai ni Tatte" (舞台に立って)		3:29
12.	"Gekijō" (劇上)		3:20
Total length:			42:26

== Credits and personnel ==
- Ayase – vocals (12), songwriter (all), English lyrics (1), producer (all), instruments (all), sampler (3–4, 7, 9), keyboards (3)
- Ikura – vocals (all)
- Konnie Aoki – English lyrics (1), background chorus lyrics (3–4)
- Haley Lewis – chorus (3)
- Missy Suzuki – chorus (3)
- Leona Ortiz – chorus (3)
- Dylan Ortiz – chorus (3)
- Jonas Whitaker – chorus (3)
- Plusonica – chorus (4, 10)
- 18Fes participants – chorus (10), based story writer (10)
- Satoru Taguchi – guitar (3)
- Rockwell – guitar (6, 11–12)
- Ash – guitar (7, 9)
- Sota Morimitsu – bass (6)
- Yukiko Tanaka – chorus arrangement (10)
- E. C. Myers – based story writer (1)
- Fuyu Tsuyama – based story writer (2)
- Nisio Isin – based story writer (3)
- X users who submitted story via #MemoryOfPlay – based story writer (4)
- Mari Okada – based story writer (5)
- Kenta Shinohara – based story writer (7)
- Ayano Takeda – based story writer (8)
- Mado Arute – based story writer (9)
- Jun Esaka – based story writer (11)
- Kōki Mitani – based story writer (12)
- Takayuki Saitō – recording (all)
- Manami Sugishita – recording (2, 6), chorus recording (4)
- Masahiro Tamato – recording (12)
- Masahiko Fukui – mixing (all)
- Hidekazu Sakai – mastering (all)

== Charts ==
=== Weekly charts ===
Weekly chart performance for The Book For,
Chart (2026)	Peak position
Japanese Albums (Oricon)	7
Japanese Combined Albums (Oricon)	7
Japanese Hot Albums (Billboard Japan)	7
UK Independent Albums Breakers (Official Charts)	16
US Top Album Sales (Billboard)	40
US World Albums (Billboard)	15

=== Monthly charts ===
Monthly chart performance for The Book For,
Chart (2026)	Position
Japanese Albums (Oricon)	17

== Release history ==
Release dates and formats for The Book For,
Region	Date	Format	Version	Label	Ref.
Various	June 26, 2026	Digital download; streaming	Digital	Echoes; Sony Japan	
Japan	June 26, 2026	CD	Limited	Echoes; Sony Japan	
Various	June 26, 2026	LP	Overwatch; Yoasobi Art	Echoes; Sony Japan	
Various	June 30, 2026	Digital download	Voice Memo	Echoes; Sony Japan	
Japan	July 31, 2026	LP	Analog	Echoes; Sony Japan	
