= Pop Out Zepp Tour =

2024 concert tour by Yoasobi

- Tour by Yoasobi
- Promotional poster
- Location: Japan
- Associated albums: The Book 3
- Start date: January 25, 2024
- End date: March 9, 2024
- Legs: 1
- No. of shows: 12
- Attendance: 25,000
- Website: Official website

Yoasobi concert chronology
- Yoasobi Asia Tour (2023–2024); Pop Out Zepp Tour (2024); Yoasobi Live in the USA (2024)

The Pop Out Zepp Tour (officially titled Yoasobi Zepp Tour 2024 "Pop Out") was the third concert tour by Japanese duo Yoasobi in support of their third extended play The Book 3. It began on January 25, 2024, in Tokyo, and concluded on March 9 in Nagoya, comprising twelve shows at Zepp venues across Japan. The concert featured immersive 3D display by wearing 3D glasses, and received total 25,000 attendees.

== Background and overview ==
On October 1, 2023, Yoasobi announced their first Zepp tour and third overall tour, titled Pop Out. The tour will consist of 12 shows in Zepp concert halls in six cities throughout Japan. The duo's third extended play The Book 3, released on October 4, 2023, included the tour's serial number for lottery ticketing exclusively to official fan club. The general ticket sales went on January 13, 2024. Zepp's brand ZPZP collaborated for the first time with Yoasobi and for the tour's official goods. The Tokyo second day show was released to Wowow on March 10.

Before the encore at Tokyo first show, Yoasobi announced their then-upcoming fifth-anniversary concert tour, initially titled Dome Live 2024 (later was changed to Chō-genjitsu Dome Live), to hold from October 26 to November 10 at Kyocera Dome Osaka and Tokyo Dome, as well as their second video album The Film 2, released on April 10, which included the footage of the second day of the Tokyo shows.

== Critical reception ==
Rockin'On Japan's Marina Ōhashi praised the first Tokyo show of Pop Out Zepp Tour as "an intense and overwhelming 90 minutes filled with 'Pop Out' tricks that ran through at a speed like a roller coaster," and "super three-dimensional, moving between physical and virtual, and is so immersive that you forget you're in a live house." Tomoyuki Mori of Real Sound wrote that the duo "showed off their high potential as a live band and their even more evolved entertainment ability."

== Setlist ==
1. "Seventeen"
2. "Shukufuku"
3. "Sangenshoku"
4. "Halzion"
5. "Suki da" (day 1) / "Mr." (day 2)
6. "Tabun"
7. "Biri-Biri"
8. "Kaibutsu"
9. "Moshi mo Inochi ga Egaketara"
10. "Yasashii Suisei"
11. "Tsubame"
12. "Idol" (contains element of "Interlude 'Worship'")
13. "Yūsha"
14. "Adventure"
15. "Gunjō"
16. "Heart Beat"

Encore

17. "Yoru ni Kakeru"

Notes

- During the first day show in Tokyo, Yoasobi did not perform "Sangenshoku" and performed both "Suki da" and "Mr."
- During the second day show in Tokyo, Yoasobi did not perform "Suki da" and "Mr." and performed "Taishō Roman" and "Sangenshoku" instead.

== Shows ==
List of concerts, showing date, city, country, venue and attendance
Date (2024)	City (Note: Labelled as each prefecture the city located showing in promotional material.)	Country	Venue	Attendance
January 25	Tokyo	Japan	Zepp Haneda	25,000
January 26	Tokyo	Japan	Zepp Haneda	25,000
February 1	Sapporo	Japan	Zepp Sapporo	25,000
February 2	Sapporo	Japan	Zepp Sapporo	25,000
February 8	Yokohama	Japan	KT Zepp Yokohama	25,000
February 9	Yokohama	Japan	KT Zepp Yokohama	25,000
February 15	Fukuoka	Japan	Zepp Fukuoka	25,000
February 16	Fukuoka	Japan	Zepp Fukuoka	25,000
February 22	Osaka	Japan	Zepp Osaka Bayside	25,000
February 23	Osaka	Japan	Zepp Osaka Bayside	25,000
March 8	Nagoya	Japan	Zepp Nagoya	25,000
March 9	Nagoya	Japan	Zepp Nagoya	25,000

== Personnel ==
Yoasobi

- Ayase – keyboard, synthesizer, sampler
- Ikura – vocals

Band

- Zacro Misohagi – keyboard chorus
- AssH – guitar
- Honogumo – drums (Tokyo, Fukuoka, Osaka)
- Tatsuya Amano – drums (Sapporo, Yokohama, Nagoya)
- Hikaru Yamamoto – bass
