= Gekijo =

Gekijo, Gekijō, or Gekijyo may refers to:

- "Gekijō" (Shizuka Kudo song), 1996
- "Gekijō" (Yoasobi song), 2025
