= E-Side 4 =

EP by Yoasobi
- Released: April 24, 2026
- Length: 32:28
- Language: English
- Labels: Echoes; Sony Japan
- Producer: Ayase

Yoasobi chronology
| E-Side 3 (2024) | E-Side 4 (2026) | The Book For, (2026) |

Singles from E-Side 4
- 1. "On the Stage" Released: August 11, 2024; 2. "Monotone (English version)" Released: October 2, 2024; 3. "Undead (English version)" Released: February 28, 2025; 4. "Players (English version)" Released: May 23, 2025; 5. "Watch Me! (English version)" Released: May 30, 2025; 6. "New Me (English version)" Released: July 11, 2025

E-Side 4 is the fourth English-language EP (eighth overall) by Japanese duo Yoasobi. It was released on April 24, 2026, through Echoes and Sony Music Entertainment Japan. Like the previous E-Side EP series, the nine-track EP contains the duo's songs recorded in English. Six singles preceded the EP: the English versions of "On the Stage", "Monotone", "Undead", "Players", "Watch Me!", and "New Me".

== Background and release ==
Japanese duo Yoasobi has issued three English-language EPs since 2021: E-Side, E-Side 2, and E-Side 3. Following the release of E-Side 3, the duo continued releasing six other English versions of their songs from August 2024 to July 2025—"On the Stage", an NHK's coverage of 2024 sports event broadcastings; "Monotone", a theme for the Japanese animated film Fureru (2024); "Undead", a theme for the original net animation Monogatari: Off & Monster Season (2024); "Players", using for commemorating the 30th anniversary of the first PlayStation release; "Watch Me!", the first opening theme for the anime series Witch Watch (2025); and "New Me", a jingle for Recruit's Mada, Koko ni Nai, Deai, Koko ni Nai, Ongaku project commercial, "Wakaranai mama, Sore de mo".

In early 2026, Yoasobi was confirmed to participate in two North American major music festivals—Osheaga Festival, held in Montreal, Canada on July 31; and Lollapalooza, held in Chicago, the United States on August 2. On April 13, the duo launched their official store for US customers. The next two days, the duo announced their fourth English-language EP, titled E-Side 4, alongside its cover artwork and track list, set to be released the next week, on April 24, as well as their concert tour in North America, titled Never Ending Stories Tour, in August. Music videos for the English versions of "Adrena", "Baby", and "Heart Beat" premiered between April 24 and 26.

== Track listing ==
All tracks are written by Ayase, and translated into English by Konnie Aoki. Track 4 was additionally translated by BFNK.

E-Side 4 track listing
| No. | Title | Length |
|---|---|---|
| 1. | "Adrena" | 3:07 |
| 2. | "Undead" | 3:02 |
| 3. | "Watch Me!" | 3:05 |
| 4. | "Baby" | 3:52 |
| 5. | "New Me" | 3:23 |
| 6. | "Monotone" | 3:30 |
| 7. | "On the Stage" | 3:28 |
| 8. | "Players" | 3:21 |
| 9. | "Heart Beat" | 5:34 |
| Total length: | | 32:28 |

Notes

- All tracks are noted as "English version".

== Charts ==
Chart performance for E-Side 4
| Chart (2026) | Peak position |
|---|---|
| Japanese Digital Albums (Oricon) | 7 |
| Japanese Download Albums (Billboard Japan) | 9 |

== Release history ==
Release dates and formats for E-Side 4
| Region | Date | Format | Label | Ref. |
|---|---|---|---|---|
| Various | April 24, 2026 | Digital download; streaming | Echoes; Sony Japan | |
