= Orion (Yoasobi song) =

- English version cover

Single by Yoasobi

from the EP The Book For,
- Language: Japanese; English
- Released: June 26, 2026
- Genre: Drum and bass; futurecore
- Length: 3:26
- Label: Echoes; Sony Japan
- Composer: Ayase
- Lyricists: Ayase; Konnie Aoki
- Producer: Ayase

Yoasobi singles chronology
"Baby" (2026)	"Orion" (2026)	"Sakihokore" (2026)

Music video
- "Orion" on YouTube; English version on YouTube

"Orion" (Japanese: オリオン) is a song by Japanese duo Yoasobi from their fourth EP, The Book For,. It was released through Echoes and Sony Music Entertainment Japan on June 26, 2026, concurrently with its parent EP. Written by Ayase, co-written English lyrics by Konnie Aoki, and based on E. C. Myers's short story The Fall of a Sparrow, the song serves as a promotional song for the duo's collaborative project to commemorate the 10th anniversary of the video game franchise Overwatch and the launch of the game's third seasonal content after its rebranding, "Into the Tiger's Den". A-1 Pictures and Ijigen Tokyo produced its music video, which premiered on July 4.

== Background and release ==
On May 13, 2026, video game franchise Overwatch posted a screenshot of a text conversation between Overwatch and Japanese duo Yoasobi. It shows each appreciating the other side, and Overwatch said, "Imagine what we could do together," hinting at a collaboration for the video game's tenth anniversary. Following the announcement of the duo's fourth Japanese-language EP, The Book For, it was confirmed that the collaborative track will be added on the EP.

On May 28, the duo appeared at the Overwatch × Yoasobi Collaboration and New Season Announcement Event in Tokyo, where the collaboration was formally announced and began on July 1, alongside the game's Tokyo-themed new map Neon Junction, which later became part of the game's third seasonal content, "Into the Tiger's Den". The contents consists of the original short story The Fall of a Sparrow (地に堕ちた雀, Ji ni Ochita Suzume), the song "Orion", animated music video produced by A-1 Pictures, and skins for the game's characters. "Orion" was released as a track of The Book For, on June 26. The English version was released on July 10.

== Lyrics and composition ==
American writer E. C. Myers wrote a short story specifically for "Orion", titled The Fall of a Sparrow. It was published on the Overwatch official website on May 28, 2026. The story depicts Genji returns to Tokyo to reconnoiter about Hashimoto Clan criminal organization that assassinated his and Hanzo's father, Sojiro Shimada, and discovering their alliance with the terrorist organization Talon, and discovering reports of mysterious weapons, resembling those once forged for the Shimada clan. Hanzo and Kiriko also join the mission. Genji allows himself to be captured by Hashimoto to gather more information. After the release, Genji meets a mysterious character with "a mechanical, robotic tinge to her voice."

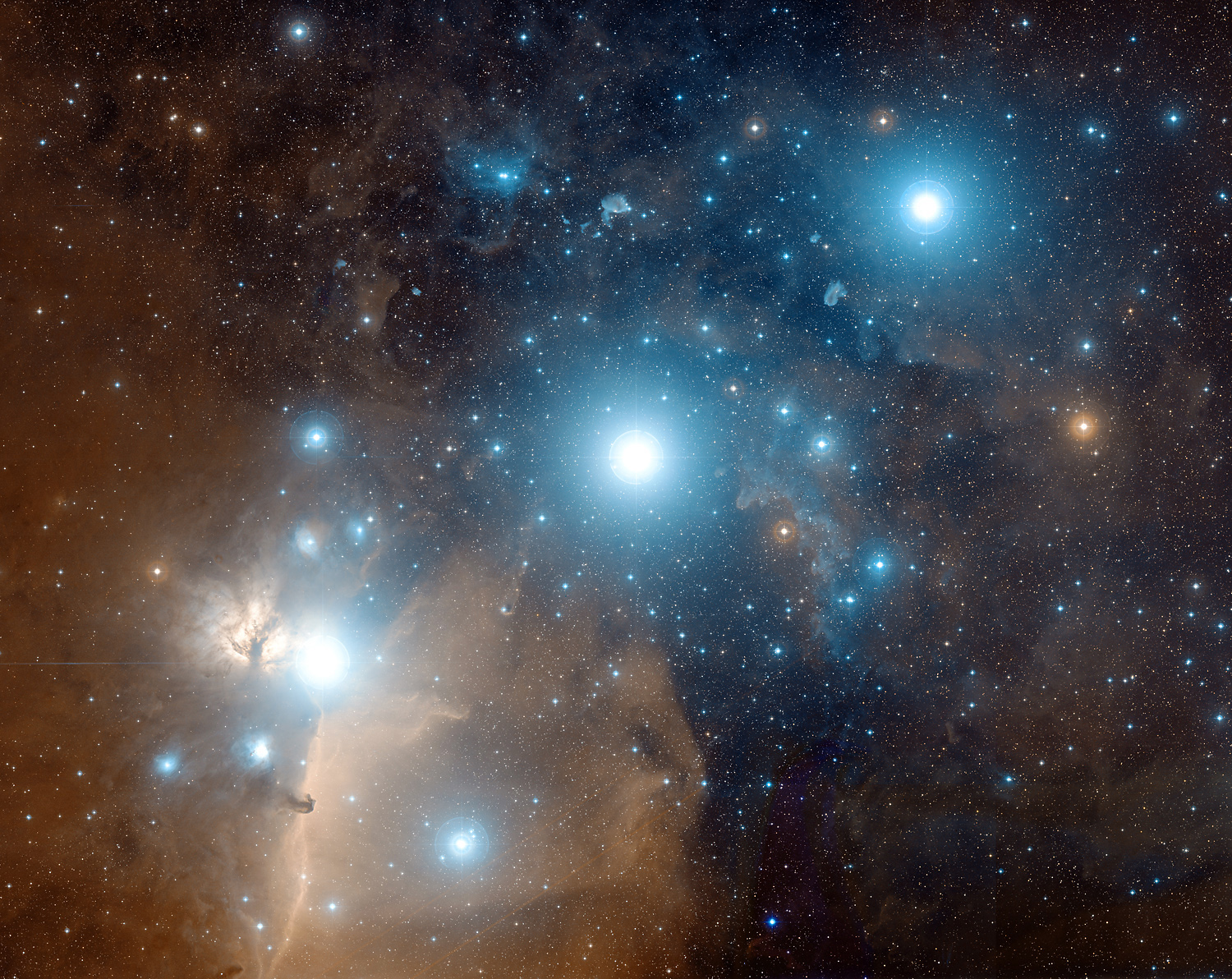
The lyrics of "Orion" compare Genji, Hanzo, and Kiriko to Orion's Belt (pictured)

Lyrically, "Orion" centers on the relationship among Genji, Hanzo, and Kiriko, as they retrace their memories and confront their own feelings, likening them to the three stars of Orion's Belt, which appear close together despite their great distance from one another. The lyrics switch perspectives between Kiriko and a "bird's-eye view" narrator. Driven by "futuristic" drum and bass and futurecore, the song incorporated the sound of Japanese traditional string instrument koto, and contains star-sparkling sound effect. Writing for Read Sound, music critic Tomoyuki Mori additionally noted "Orion" about its lyrics that using "realistic" words, in contrast with the game's fictional worldview, as well as J-pop-styled lyricism and "stylishly polished soundscape".

== Music video ==
An accompanying music video for "Orion" premiered on July 4, 2026, preceded by a teaser video. Produced by A-1 Pictures and Ijigen Tokyo, the animated visuals follow the story of The Fall of a Sparrow, which expresses the pasts and struggles of Genji, Hanzo, and Kiriko, as well as action scenes. The English version's music video was uploaded on July 10.

== Live performances ==
Yoasobi debuted the performance of "Orion" on June 29, 2026, at the Platinum Live segment of CDTV Live! Live!. Filmed at Toyota Arena Tokyo with 600 fans, its footage was uploaded via YouTube for limited period on July 6. The duo added the song to the setlist for their North American Never Ending Stories Tour and BlizzCon 2026.

== Credits and personnel ==
- Ayase – songwriter, English lyrics, producer, instruments
- Ikura – vocals
- Konnie Aoki – English lyrics
- E. C. Myers – based story writer
- Takayuki Saitō – vocal recording
- Masahiko Fukui – mixing
- Hidekazu Sakai – mastering

== Charts ==
Chart performance for "Orion"
Chart (2026)	Peak position
Japan Digital Singles (Oricon)	7
Japan Hot 100 (Billboard)	25

== Release history ==
Release dates and formats for "Orion"
Region	Date	Format	Version	Label	Ref.
Various	June 26, 2026	Digital download; streaming	Original	Echoes; Sony Japan	
Various	July 10, 2026	Digital download; streaming	English	Echoes; Sony Japan	
Various	September 14, 2026	Digital download; streaming	Psyqui remix	Echoes; Sony Japan	
