= Yoasobi Asia Tour 2023–2024 =

2023–2024 concert tour by Yoasobi

- Tour by Yoasobi
- Seoul promotional poster
- Location: Asia
- Associated albums: The Book 3
- Start date: December 1, 2023
- End date: January 21, 2024
- Legs: 1
- No. of shows: 8
- Attendance: 42,000

Yoasobi concert chronology
- Denkōsekka Arena Tour (2023); Yoasobi Asia Tour (2023–2024); Pop Out Zepp Tour (2024)

The Yoasobi Asia Tour 2023–2024 was the second concert tour and first overseas by Japanese duo Yoasobi. Consisting of eight shows, the tour began on December 1, 2023, in Hong Kong, China, as part of Clockenflap music festival, and concluded on January 21, 2024, in New Taipei City, Taiwan.

== Background and ticketing ==
On September 19, 2023, Yoasobi announced their concert tour in Asia, visiting Hong Kong, Taipei, Seoul, Singapore, and Kuala Lumpur from December 1, 2023, to January 21, 2024, which shows in Hong Kong and Taipei on December 3 were part of music festivals Clockenflap and Simple Life Festival, respectively. Ticket for original Seoul show, holding at Tiger Dome, Korea University, went on sale on October 4, and on October 18 for additional show on December 17 due to overwhelming demand. The duo announced venue for Taipei own show on October 23, being Zepp New Taipei. Taipei show tickets went on sales on October 28. All three shows were sold out in one minute.

On November 25, Sozo, the tour's promoter in Southeast Asia, revealed venues for shows in Kuala Lumpur and Singapore, which were Zepp Kuala Lumpur and Resorts World Sentosa, and announced addition show in Jakarta, to hold on January 16 at Istora Senayan. The three shows went on sale on December 1. For the Singapore show, numerous fans reported that during ticket paying process by Ticketmaster, personal information, such as name, e-mail address, and phone number, got leaked by showing the others instead of their owns. The second day of Seoul show footage was included on the duo's video album The Film 2, released on April 10, 2024.

== Critical reception ==
For Clockenflap show, Clash's Bryson Edward Howe called Yoasobi's stage a "magnetic communion". JX Soo from NME praised that the performance was "not disappointed" and "impeccabl[e]" production. Hwang Sun-up of IZM described that the Seoul shows "were like watching a racehorse running at full speed from start to finish, to the point where it seemed like a strategy targeting Generation Z, who have difficulty concentrating." The Straits Times journalist Jan Lee admired the Singapore show "an efficient 90-minute party with almost no breaks and filled to the brim with good songs," and, during upbeat songs, "the atmosphere was almost akin to a nightclub rave instead of a concert."

== Setlist ==
This set list is representative of the show in Singapore on January 12, 2024. It is not intended to represent all shows.

1. "Yoru ni Kakeru" †
2. "Shukufuku" †
3. "Sangenshoku" †
4. "Seventeen" †
5. "Biri-Biri" †
6. "Mr." †
7. "Yasashii Suisei" †
8. "Yūsha" †
9. "Mō Sukoshi Dake"
10. "Haruka"
11. "Halzion"
12. "Tabun" †
13. "Ano Yume o Nazotte"
14. "Kaibutsu" †
15. "Gunjō" †
16. "Adventure"

Encore

17. "Idol"

Notes

- The songs featured on music festivals were marked with a dagger (†).
- During the festivals and Seoul shows, "Mr." was performed before "Biri-Biri".
- During the festivals shows, "Yūsha" was performed between "Tabun" and "Kaibutsu".
- During the two Seoul shows, only "Haruka" was performed on the first day, and "Halzion" on the second day.
- During the Jakarta and New Taipei City shows, Pokémon mascots—Pikachu, Sprigatito, Fuecoco, and Quaxly—joined Yoasobi on stage to perform "Biri-Biri".

== Shows ==
List of 2023 concerts, showing date, city, country, venue and attendance
Date (2023)	City	Country	Venue	Attendance
December 1 (Note: This concert was part of Clockenflap)	Hong Kong	China	Central Harbourfront Event Space	10,000
December 3 (Note: This concert was part of Simple Life Festival)	Taipei	Taiwan	Huashan 1914 Creative Park	10,000
December 16	Seoul	South Korea	Tiger Dome, Korea University	8,500
December 17	Seoul	South Korea	Tiger Dome, Korea University	8,500

List of 2024 concerts, showing date, city, country, venue and attendance
Date (2024)	City	Country	Venue	Attendance
January 11	Singapore		Resorts World Ballroom	5,500
January 14	Kuala Lumpur	Malaysia	Zepp Kuala Lumpur	—
January 16	Jakarta	Indonesia	Istora Senayan	6,000
January 21	New Taipei City (Note: Promoted as Taipei)	Taiwan	Zepp New Taipei	2,000
Total				42,000

== Personnel ==
Yoasobi

- Ayase – keyboard, synthesizer, sampler
- Ikura – vocals

Band

- Zacro Misohagi – keyboard chorus
- AssH – guitar
- Hikaru Yamamoto – bass
- Tatsuya Amano – drums (Hong Kong, Taipei, Seoul)
- Honogumo – drums (Singapore, Malaysia, Indonesia, New Taipei City)
