= New Me =

Single by Yoasobi

from the EP The Book For,
- Language: Japanese; English
- Released: November 11, 2024
- Genre: Electropop
- Length: 3:26
- Label: Echoes; Sony Japan
- Songwriter: Ayase
- Producer: Ayase

Yoasobi singles chronology
"Monotone" (2024)	"New Me" (2024)	"Players" (2025)

Music video
- "New Me" on YouTube; English version on YouTube

"New Me" is a song by Japanese duo Yoasobi from their fourth EP, The Book For, (2026). It was released on November 11, 2024, through Echoes and Sony Music Entertainment Japan. Based on Mado Arute's short story Hakusan-dōri Enjō no Ken, the song was used as a jingle for Recruit's Mada, Koko ni Nai, Deai, Koko ni Nai, Ongaku project commercial, "Wakaranai mama, Sore de mo".

== Background and release ==
In August 2023, literary magazine Bungei partnered with creative writing social media Monogatary.com for Bungei × Monogatary.com Collaboration Award at the novel contest Monocon 2023. Seven winners from a total of 879 stories were announced on February 28, 2024; one of all is short story Hakusan-dōri Enjō no Ken (Japanese: 白山通り炎上の件; lit. 'The Hakusan Street Incident'), written by Mado Arute. An action genre, it is about Nozomi, a female freelancer who struggled at workplace due to a pressure from her male colleagues, meets a mysterious guy from dating app, which later find that he is an assassin. The two are chased by and fight against their enemies, leading Nozomi to discover unexpected truths about herself.

On the same day, it was announced that the duo Yoasobi would perform the song based on the winning story. Furthermore, this song would be used as a tie-up for human resources company Recruit's second part of the project Mada, Koko ni Nai, Deai, Koko ni Nai, Ongaku television advertisement, scheduled for airing in late 2024. On October 1, Yoasobi's fifth anniversary, the song, titled "New Me", first unveiled on the 15-second commercial for the project "Wakaranai mama, Sore de mo" (わからないまま、それでも; lit. 'Without knowing, nevertheless'), and was made available to digital music and streaming platforms on November 11, 2024. It later featured on the duo's fourth Japanese-language EP, The Book For, (2026). The re-arranged English version of the song was released on July 11, 2025, and included on the duo's English-language EP, E-Side 4 (2026).

== Title and composition ==
According to a Recruit interview with Yoasobi in October 2024, Ayase chose the title "New Me" because he "wanted to use an English phrase that conveys something like 'a new birth', 'a new encounter', or 'a new change in yourself' at first glance," and it was "catchy and cute-sounding." Musically, the song is a mid-tempo electropop song with "sticky" bass line, depicting the theme of "a new rebirth of oneself", about the change and journey in the protagonist's state of mind as they moves forward with each new day despite their own conflicts.

== Music video ==
An accompanying music video for "New Me", directed by Havtza, premiered on November 30, 2024, at 22:00 JST, preceded by a ten-second teaser video two days before. Based on Hakusan-dōri Enjō no Ken, the animated music video expresses Nozomi, the protagonist from the story, who is troubled by interpersonal relationships at work, getting caught up in a thrilling action scene due to an unexpected event which lead Nozomi to discover the truths about herself. The English version's music video, directed by Hana Watanabe, was uploaded on July 11, 2025. It stars Tsugumi and depicts her everyday life both in a room and outside.

== Live performances ==
Yoasobi included "New Me" on the setlist for Chō-genjitsu Dome Live as the twelfth song, which they debuted the performance at Kyocera Dome for the Osaka show on October 27, 2024, before the song's release. The duo performed the song with the reproduction situated at the center platform of Ayase's temporary room at his sister's house, where he wrote Yoasobi's songs in their early career. The duo performed the song, alongside "Idol", at the 2024 Melon Music Awards on November 30 at Inspired Arena, Incheon, South Korea, where they won J-pop Favorite Artist, as well as music program The Show three days later.

== Track listing ==
- Digital download and streaming
1. "New Me" – 3:26
- Digital download and streaming – English version
1. "New Me" (English version) – 3:22

== Credits and personnel ==
- Ayase – songwriter, producer, sampler
- Ikura – vocals
- Konnie Aoki – English version lyrics
- Ash – guitar
- Mado Arute – based story writer
- Takayuki Saitō – vocal recording
- Masahiko Fukui – mixing
- Hidekazu Sakai – mastering

== Charts ==
Chart performance for "New Me"
Chart (2024)	Peak position
Japan Digital Singles (Oricon)	2
Japan Hot 100 (Billboard)	40

== Release history ==
Release dates and formats for "New Me"
Region	Date	Format	Version	Label	Ref.
Various	November 11, 2024	Digital download; streaming	Original	Echoes; Sony Japan	
Various	July 11, 2025	Digital download; streaming	English	Echoes; Sony Japan	
