= Gekijō (Yoasobi song) =

Single by Yoasobi

from the EP The Book For,
- Language: Japanese
- English title: "The Show"
- Released: October 2, 2025
- Genre: Electronic rock; dance-pop
- Length: 3:18
- Label: Echoes; Sony Japan
- Songwriter: Ayase
- Producer: Ayase

Yoasobi singles chronology
"Watch Me!" (2025)	"Gekijō" (2025)	"Adrena" (2026)

Music video
- "Gekijō" on YouTube

"Gekijō" (Japanese: 劇上; lit. 'on the stage') is a song by Japanese duo Yoasobi from their fourth EP, The Book For, (2026). It was released as a single through Echoes and Sony Music Entertainment Japan on October 2, 2025. The song serves as a theme for the Fuji TV television serial drama series Pray Speak What Has Happened (2025), the duo's first time to perform a song for the medium, and that features vocals from the member Ayase.

Musically, "Gekijō" is an upbeat electronic rock about the former stage actor protagonist questioning his role in life while watching a dance performance at a dance hall, resulting in regaining a positive attitude, as well as modern people's anxiety about being evaluated by others, based on the series writer Kōki Mitani's autobiographical short story Gekijō Monogatari. The song's music video stars Ayase and Ikura for the first time, alongside the supporting band and the series casts Masaki Suda and Fumi Nikaido.

== Background and release ==
On September 2, 2025, the new Fuji TV Wednesday 22:00 slot's television serial drama series Pray Speak What Has Happened was announced. During the series' test screening event on September 21, Yoasobi announced via the video that they would perform a theme for the series, titled "Gekijō". The song is the duo's first song that provides for television drama and features vocals from the member Ayase. Yoasobi teased the snippets of the song on September 28 and 30, and October 1 via their social media. The duo discussed the song production's behind-the-scenes during their sixth anniversary livestream via YouTube on October 1. The full-length version was released to digital music and streaming platforms the next day, the day after the series' first episode airing. "Gekijō" was later included on the duo's fourth Japanese-language EP, The Book For, (2026).

== Composition and reception ==
"Gekijō" was sourced from the autobiographical short story Gekijō Monogatari (劇場ものがたり; lit. 'theater story'), written by Pray Speak What Has Happened writer Kōki Mitani, which was available for reading since October 1 via FOD. Centered on the theme of "the world is a stage, and all humans are actors," and condensing the current state of the duo, Yoasobi themselves called the song their own response to William Shakespeare's phrase "all the world's a stage" from his pastoral comedy As You Like It. The song is described as an upbeat electronic rock with "driving yet powerful" guitar and synthesizer, and dynamic rhythm, and has 130 beats per minute.

Lyrically, "Gekijō" depicts the emotional transition of a hopeless and tired-of-life protagonist. He arrives at a quiet dance hall and, while watching a dance performance, begins to question his role in life by comparing himself to a performer on the stage. It results in the protagonist regaining a positive attitude and making a decision through a reminiscence of his time as a stage actor. The song also reflects modern people's anxiety about the mercy of being evaluated by others, as a performer exposed to the audience's gaze, tossed about between applause and ridicule. However, it is still encouraged to live life to the fullest.

Ine Tanaka from Eiga Channel commented that "Gekijō" is "very Reiwa feel", despite the 1980s Shōwa setting of the series. Rockin'On Japan's Tomoyuki Mori praised the song "levates the dire current situation into a sparkling pop song." Electric Bloom Webzine chose "Gekijō" one of the best J-pop songs in 2025, called it "a punchy, live-band-forward cut with driving guitars, dance-pop bounce, and vocalist Ikura's signature rapid-fire sing-talk delivery that just avoids the rap label."

== Music video ==
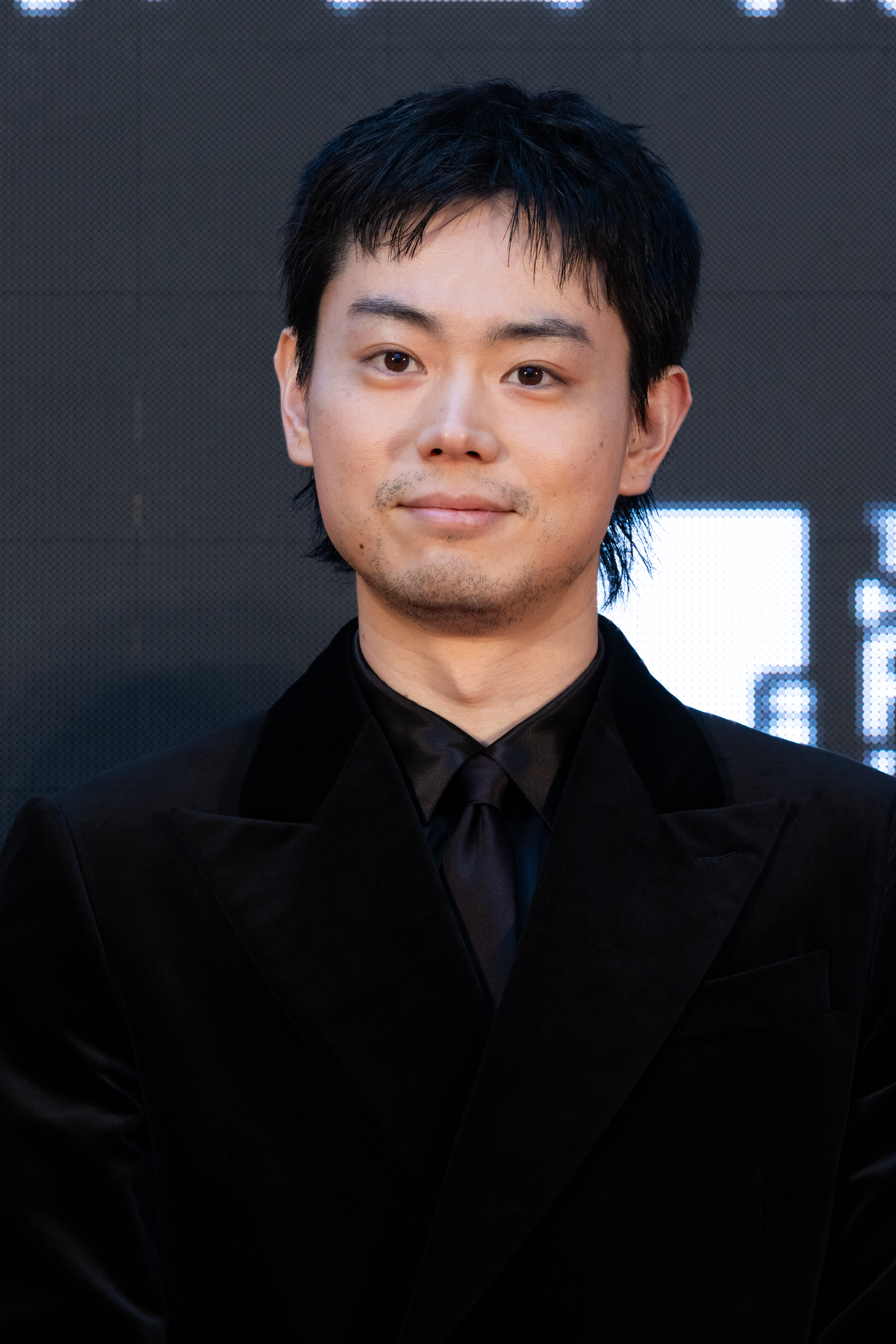
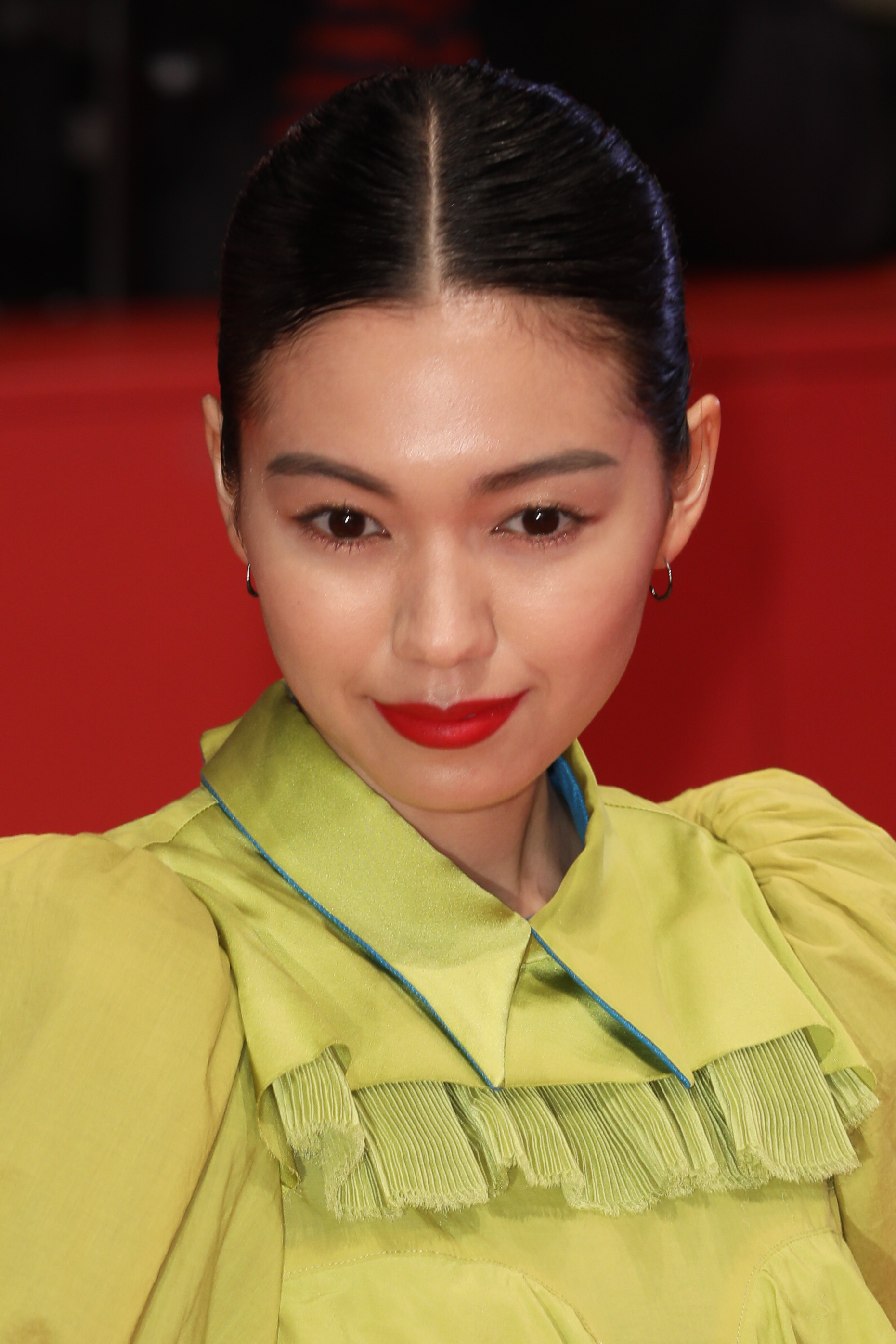
Pray Speak What Has Happened casts Masaki Suda (left) and Fumi Nikaido (right) star on the "Gekijō" music video.

An accompanying music video for "Gekijō", directed by Pennacky, premiered on October 8 at 23:15 JST, immediately after the second episode of Pray Speak What Has Happened aired, preceded by a teaser video two days before. Unlike the previous animated works, it became the first live-action music video that stars Yoasobi's members Ayase and Ikura, as well as its supporting band: guitarist AssH, bassist Sota Morimitsu, drummer Hiroki Oono, and keyboardist Yomn.

The music video, as a theme of the song, depicts a "story within a story", with multiple cameras held by camera operators filming Yoasobi and the supporting band while performing without the audience's applause and jeers. The video also featured cameos of Masaki Suda and Fumi Nikaido, ensemble casts of Pray Speak What Has Happened. It shows both actors reading scripts and acting while directing themselves.

== Promotion and live performances ==
Yoasobi debuted the live performance of "Gekijō" at the Morioka show of Wandara Hall Tour on October 10, 2025, and included it on the tour's setlist. Then, the duo performed the song at the music event Zozofes, held at K-Arena Yokohama on October 13, which the footage was uploaded via their YouTube on October 22. The duo appeared on the Pray Speak What Has Happened special episode of the music variety show The Weekly 99 Music on October 15, alongside Suda, Nikaido, and Mitani.

== Credits and personnel ==
- Ayase – vocals, writer, producer, instruments
- Ikura – vocals
- Rockwell – guitar
- Kōki Mitani – based story writer
- Takayuki Saitō – Ikura's vocal recording
- Masahiro Tamato – Ayase's vocal recording
- Masahiko Fukui – mixing
- Hidekazu Sakai – mastering

== Charts ==
=== Weekly charts ===
Weekly chart performance for "Gekijō"
Chart (2025)	Peak position
Japan Digital Singles (Oricon)	4
Japan Hot 100 (Billboard)	24

=== Year-end charts ===
Year-end chart performance for "Gekijō"
Chart (2025)	Position
Japan Download Songs (Billboard Japan)	97

== Release history ==
Release dates and formats for "Gekijō"
Region	Date	Format	Label	Ref.
Various	October 2, 2025	Digital download; streaming	Echoes; Sony Japan	
