= E. C. Myers =

American writer

- Born: Eugene Charles Myers; 1978 (age 47–48)
- Education: Clarion West Writers Workshop
- Occupation: Novelist
- Writing career
- Genres: Science fiction
- Notable works: Fair Coin; The Silence of Six
- Notable awards: Andre Norton Award
- Website: ecmyers.net

Eugene Charles Myers (born 1978), better known by his pen name E. C. Myers, is an American writer best known as the writer of the 2012 Andre Norton Award-winning Young Adult (YA) science fiction novel Fair Coin, and his 2014 YA hacktivist novel The Silence of Six. Myers is a graduate of the Clarion West Writers Workshop.

== Works ==
- Fair Coin (2012)
- Quantum Coin (2012)
- The Silence of Six (2014)
- Against All Silence (2016)
- A Thousand Beginnings and Endings (Contributing Writer) (2018)
- RWBY: After the Fall (2019)
- RWBY: Before the Dawn (2020)
- RWBY: Fairy Tales of Remnant (2020)
- RWBY: Roman Holiday (2021)
- Five Nights at Freddy's: Interactive Novel #0 - VIP (2024)
- Five Nights at Freddy's: Interactive Novel #1 - The Week Before (2024)
- Little Nightmares: The Lonely Ones (2025)
