= Players (Yoasobi song) =

Single by Yoasobi

from the EP The Book For,
- Language: Japanese; English
- Released: March 21, 2025
- Genre: Electropop
- Length: 3:21
- Label: Echoes; Sony Japan
- Songwriter: Ayase
- Producer: Ayase

Yoasobi singles chronology
"New Me" (2024)	"Players" (2025)	"Watch Me!" (2025)

Music video
- "Players" on YouTube; English version on YouTube

"Players" is a song by Japanese duo Yoasobi from their fourth EP, The Book For, (2026). It was released as a single on March 21, 2025, through Echoes and Sony Music Entertainment Japan. Based on "a game you want to erase your memory of and play again" stories collected from users via X (formerly Twitter) hashtag #MemoryOfPlay, the song is used to commemorate the 30th anniversary of the first PlayStation release.

== Background and release ==
On December 3, 2024, Yoasobi and PlayStation announced a collaboration project to commemorate the 30th anniversary of the home video game console's first release, called Project: Memory Card. The duo would perform a song based on stories about "a game you want to erase your memory of and play again" to "save PlayStation memories in Yoasobi's song" submitted by users via X's hashtag #MemoryOfPlay until January 31, 2025. The duo and the game first teased the upcoming song via X on March 17, featuring the text "3.21", before confirmed the next two day, titled "Players", to be available digitally on March 21. The song is also used as a jingle on PlayStation's 30th anniversary commercial. The English version was released on May 23, and included on the duo's English-language EP, E-Side 4 (2026). The original version featured on the duo's fourth Japanese-language EP, The Book For, (2026).

== Composition ==
"Players" is described as a pop track with electronic elements and four-on-the-floor beats, interspersed with PlayStation-esque video game sound. The lyrics feature repeated opening chant "Play on! You & me! Set on the legacy!" and chorus "Mō ikkai mō ikkai," (Note: Japanese: もう一回 もう一回, lit. 'one more time, one more time'; "Now retry, now retry" in English version) and contain positive messages to some people in gloomy daily life who once have played PlayStation of giving a push in the real world and inspiring hopes for the future from the song's protagonists in the game world. The song featured uncredited chorus by current and former members of musical group Plusonica.

== Music video ==
An accompanying music video for "Players", directed by Suzkikenta and Tsuribu Tokyo, and produced by Takemi Inagaki and Upcoming Imoto, premiered on April 17, 2025, at 20:00 JST. The story begins with a man finding a memory card and use it to play on PlayStation, which he reminisces his childhood when he played the game console. The video features 30 video games created by 30 creators, paying homage to various old and new console games running on PlayStation.

== Live performances ==
Yoasobi gave the debut performance of "Players" on April 5 and 6, 2025, at Echoes Baa, a part of the Central Music & Entertainment Festival 2025, at Yokohama Red Brick Warehouse, Yokohama. On May 10, the performance of the first day was uploaded via the festival's YouTube channel, while the second day via the duo's channel. The duo performed the song on the 2025 Music Awards Japan, held at Rohm Theatre Kyoto, where was staged as a "PlayStation-meets-sci-fi" and futuristic set, and included it on the setlist for the one-off concert at Wembley Arena, London, England, and the Wandara Hall Tour, etc.

== Track listing ==
- Digital download and streaming
1. "Players" – 3:21
- Digital download and streaming – English version
1. "Players" (English version) – 3:21

== Credits and personnel ==
- Ayase – songwriter, English background chorus lyrics, producer, sampler
- Ikura – vocals
- Plusonica (Note: Consisting of Emihono, Teno Kayamoto, Kuu, Sui, Hikaru Naruke, Kantarō, Tetsuto, Kosei Nishiyama, and Ryoem) – chorus
- Andrew "Drew" Soda – English version chorus
- Awai Baptiste – English version chorus
- Christian Hatcher – English version chorus
- Ebony Bowens – English version chorus
- Imani J. Dawson – English version chorus
- Marrista K. Stubbs – English version chorus
- Konnie Aoki – English background chorus lyrics, English version lyrics
- X users who submitted story via #MemoryOfPlay – based story writer
- Takayuki Saitō – vocal recording
- Manami Sugishita – chorus recording
- Masahiko Fukui – mixing
- Hidekazu Sakai – mastering

== Charts ==
=== Weekly charts ===
Weekly chart performance for "Players"
Chart (2025)	Peak position
Japan Digital Singles (Oricon)	1
Japan Hot 100 (Billboard)	51

=== Year-end charts ===
Year-end chart performance for "Players"
Chart (2025)	Position
Japan Download Songs (Billboard Japan)	93

== Release history ==
Release dates and formats for "Players"
Region	Date	Format	Version	Label	Ref.
Various	March 21, 2025	Digital download; streaming	Original	Echoes; Sony Japan	
Various	May 23, 2025	Digital download; streaming	English	Echoes; Sony Japan	
