= Watch Me! =

Single by Yoasobi

from the EP The Book For,
- Language: Japanese
- Released: May 18, 2025
- Genre: Electropop
- Length: 3:06
- Label: Echoes; Sony Japan
- Songwriter: Ayase
- Producer: Ayase

Yoasobi singles chronology
| "Players" (2025) | "Watch Me!" (2025) | "Gekijō" (2025) |

Music video
- "Watch Me!" on YouTube; English version on YouTube

"Watch Me!" is a song by Japanese duo Yoasobi, taken from their fourth EP, The Book For, (2026). It was released as a single on May 18, 2025, through Echoes and Sony Music Entertainment Japan, and served as the first opening theme for the anime series Witch Watch (2025). Based on Kenta Shinohara's short story Kokoro Kororon, the song depicts the point of view of the anime's protagonist, Nico Wakatsuki, for her romantic feelings toward her childhood friend, Morihito Otogi. Commercially, "Watch Me!" reached number 22 on the Oricon Combined Singles Chart and number 16 on the Billboard Japan Hot 100.

== Background and release ==
An anime adaptation of Kenta Shinohara's manga series Witch Watch was first announced on August 19, 2024. The second trailer of the anime series was uploaded on February 17, 2025, unveiling the opening theme titled "Watch Me!", performed by Yoasobi. In the press release, Ayase revealed that he is a fan of the manga, as well as other Shinohara's manga series Sket Dance. "Watch Me!" was additional spoiled on the anime's opening sequence, first aired on April 6.

On May 11, following the anime's sixth episode ended, Yoasobi announced that "Watch Me!" would be available on digital music and streaming platforms on May 18, the next week. The English version was released on May 30, and included on the duo's English-language EP, E-Side 4 (2026). The CD single format was issued on June 25 with a one-sided phosphorescent box that uses key charm to unlock the inner box. The original version later featured on the duo's fourth Japanese-language EP, The Book For, (2026).

== Composition ==
"Watch Me!" is sourced from a short story, Kokoro Kororon, written by Witch Watch's manga artist Kenta Shinohara about the anime's protagonist, Nico Wakatsuki, before her witch training, depicting Nico and her childhood friend, Morihito Otogi, being troubled by their supernatural powers and their bond. Musically, "Watch Me!" is a "bright and bubbly" electropop track with "light and bouncy" beats, "cute" melody, and "dizzying" tune. The song lyrically focuses on Nico's point of view of her pure romantic feelings towards Morihito.

== Critical reception ==
Writing for Rockin'On Japan, critic Tomoki Takahashi praised "Watch Me!" that "condenses the footprints of Yoasobi's evolution since their debut, in which they have dismantled and reconstructed the common sense and stereotypes of the music scene," and is "an exhilarating and thrilling song that suggests that Ayase and Ikura's musical adventure is about to take another step into a new stage." Time Out ranked the song number 35 in the 40 best songs of 2025 list.

== Music video ==
An accompanying music video for "Watch Me" premiered on May 18, 2025, the same day as the single's release, at 17:30 JST. Produced by Folium's Daisuke Chiba and directed by Yū Nakagaito, the animated visual incorporates selected scenes from Witch Watch anime and original cuts exclusively for the music video, featuring all characters from the anime, including the protagonists Nico and Morihito. The English version's music video was released on June 8, and the collaborative music video with the manga Witch Watch on June 14.

== Live performances ==
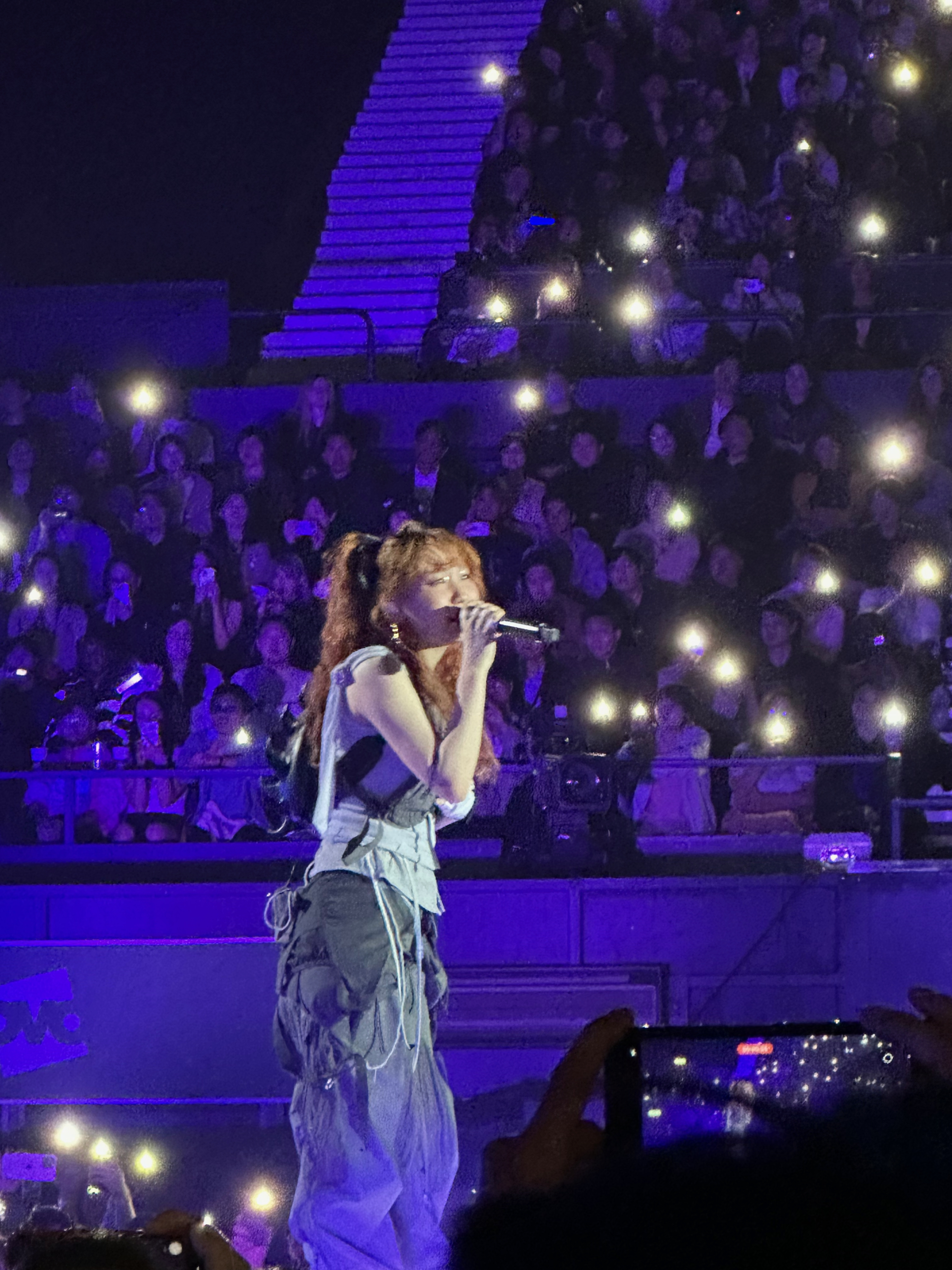
Ikura (pictured) at the Yoasobi concert in London, where the duo debuted the performance of "Watch Me!"

Yoasobi performed "Watch Me!" live for the first time at their one-off concert held in Wembley Arena, London, England on June 8 and 9, 2025. The duo later included the song on the setlist for the Wandara Hall Tour (2025).

== Accolades ==
Awards and nominations for "Watch Me!"
| Ceremony | Year | Award | Result | Ref. |
|---|---|---|---|---|
| AnimaniA Awards | 2026 | Best Anime Song | Nominated | |
| Anime Trending Awards | 2026 | Opening Theme Song of the Year | Nominated | |
| Crunchyroll Anime Awards | 2026 | Best Anime Song | Nominated | |
| Crunchyroll Anime Awards | 2026 | Best Opening Sequence | Nominated | |
| Japan Expo Awards | 2026 | Daruma for Best Opening | Nominated | |

== Track listing ==
- Digital download and streaming
1. "Watch Me" – 3:06
- Digital download and streaming – English version
1. "Watch Me" (English version) – 3:06
- CD single
1. "Watch Me" – 3:06
2. "Watch Me" (English version) – 3:06
3. "Watch Me" (anime edit) – 1:30
4. "Watch Me" (instrumental) – 3:06

== Credits and personnel ==
- Ayase – songwriter, producer, sampler
- Ikura – vocals
- Konnie Aoki – lyrics (English version), lyrical and vocal recording direction (English version)
- AssH – guitar
- Kenta Shinohara – based story writer
- BFNK – lyrical and vocal recording direction (English version)
- Takayuki Saitō – vocal recording
- Kunio Nishikawara – vocal recording (English version)
- Masahiko Fukui – mixing
- Hidekazu Sakai – mastering

== Charts ==
=== Weekly charts ===
Weekly chart performance for "Watch Me!"
| Chart (2025) | Peak position |
|---|---|
| Japan (Oricon) | 17 |
| Japan Combined Singles (Oricon) | 22 |
| Japan Anime Singles (Oricon) | 6 |
| Japan Hot 100 (Billboard) | 16 |
| Japan Hot Animation (Billboard Japan) | 6 |
| South Korea Download (Circle) | 186 |

=== Year-end charts ===
Year-end chart performance for "Watch Me!"
| Chart (2025) | Position |
|---|---|
| Japan Download Songs (Billboard Japan) | 54 |

== Release history ==
Release dates and formats for "Watch Me!"
| Region | Date | Format | Version | Label | Ref. |
|---|---|---|---|---|---|
| Various | May 18, 2025 | Digital download; streaming | Original | Echoes; Sony Japan | |
| Various | May 30, 2025 | Digital download; streaming | English | Echoes; Sony Japan | |
| Japan | June 25, 2025 | CD single | Limited | Echoes; Sony Japan | |
