= Biri-Biri =

Single by Yoasobi

from the EP The Book For,
- Language: Japanese; English
- Released: November 18, 2023
- Genre: Electropop
- Length: 3:07
- Label: Sony Japan
- Songwriter: Ayase
- Producer: Ayase

Yoasobi singles chronology
"Yūsha" (2023)	"Biri-Biri" (2023)	"Heart Beat" (2023)

Music video
- "Biri-Biri" on YouTube; English version on YouTube

"Biri-Biri" (from Japanese ビリビリ, onomatopoeia for electric shock) is a song by Japanese duo Yoasobi from their fourth EP, The Book For, (2026). It was released as a single on November 18, 2023, by Sony Music Entertainment Japan to commemorate the first anniversary of the 2022 role-playing video games Pokémon Scarlet and Violet. Written by Ayase, the song was based on the novelist Ayano Takeda's short story Kimi to Ameagari o.

An electropop track with video game music elements, "Biri-Biri" is about a bond between rivals, referring to the various Pokémon video games and using numerous Japanese sound symbolism. The 3D-animated music video for the song was directed by Ryō Sasaki and depicts the journey of two girls with various Pokémon. Commercially, "Biri-Biri" reached number 14 on the Billboard Japan Hot 100 and number 19 on the Oricon Combined Singles Chart.

== Background and release ==
On November 16, 2023, Yoasobi and The Pokémon Company announced a collaboration with the song titled "Biri-Biri", slated for release in both Japanese- and English-language versions, the latter translated by Konnie Aoki, simultaneously on November 18, 2023, the same date as the first anniversary of the role-playing video games Pokémon Scarlet and Violet. The limited CD single (in black and white editions) and 12-inch vinyl (in scarlet and violet color editions) were released on March 13, 2024, which included a code for receiving a special Pawmot in the games. The English-language version was included on the duo's third English-language EP, E-Side 3 (2024), and the Japanese version on their fourth Japanese-language EP, The Book For, (2026).

== Lyrics and composition ==
"Biri-Biri" was inspired by the game-based short story Kimi to Ameagari o (きみと雨上がりを; lit. 'After the Rain with You'), written by novelist Ayano Takeda. The story tells about "treasure hunting" of the video games' characters: Nemona, a student council president at Naranja Academy in Paldea region, and Anna, a transfer student. Lyrically, the song is about the bond between rivals, which the lyrics reference of the various Pokémon video games, from Red and Blue to the most recent Scarlet and Violet. In a Vogue Taiwan interview in December 2023, Ayase explained about the song that "does not want to convey any life message, nor does it want to tell you how to live in the future. It simply expresses our love for Pokémon."

Musically, "Biri-Biri" was described as an electropop song with hip-hop elements, and drum and bass rhythms, adding Pokémon-styled video game music, while the intro contains the battle music sounds. The song frequently uses Japanese onomatopoeia, such as "kira kira" (キラキラ; sound of sparkling), "doki doki" (ドキドキ; sound of heartbeat), "biri biri" (ビリビリ; sound of electric shock), "jiri jiri" (ジリジリ; sound of alarm bell), and "hiri hiri" (ヒリヒリ; sound of irritating). The English version expresses the rhythmic word plays replacing the original forms, such as "give me, give me" and "living living".

== Music video ==
An accompanying music video for "Biri-Biri" premiered on November 18, 2023, the same date as the single release, at 22:00 JST. Directed by Ryō Sasaki, the 3D-animated visual features Nemona and Anna's journey and bond with a variety of Pokémon, including Sprigatito, Fuecoco, Fidough, and Gengar. It also shows Pokémon battles and Nemona and Anna riding Cyclizar and Koraidon together. Later, the English version's music video was uploaded on December 4.

== Live performances ==
Yoasobi performed "Biri-Biri" for the first time on December 1, 2023, at Clockenflap music festival in Hong Kong, as part of their first Asia Tour, which was included on the tour's setlist. In the Jakarta and New Taipei City shows, Pikachu, Sprigatito, Fuecoco, and Quaxly mascots also joined the performance. It was also a part of the setlist for their Pop Out Zepp Tour, and Coachella festival. The duo debuted the televised performance of the song at Music Station Super Live 2023 on December 22, featuring augmented reality of various Pokémon. Yoasobi performed the song with NewJeans at the Bunnies Camp 2024 Tokyo Dome and the first Incheon show of Chō-genjitsu Asia Tour.

== Track listing ==
- Digital download and streaming
1. "Biri-Biri" – 3:07
2. "Biri-Biri" (English version) – 3:07
- CD single and 12-inch vinyl
1. "Biri-Biri" – 3:07
2. "Biri-Biri" (English version) – 3:07
3. "Biri-Biri" (instrumental) – 3:07

== Credits and personnel ==
- Ayase – songwriter, producer
- Ikura – vocals
- Ayano Takeda – based story writer
- Konnie Aoki – English lyrics, English version vocal direction
- BFNK – English lyrics, English version vocal direction
- Takayuki Saitō – vocal recording (original)
- Kunio Nishikawara – vocal recording (English version)
- Masahiko Fukui – mixing
- Hidekazu Sakai – mastering

== Charts ==
=== Weekly charts ===
Weekly chart performance for "Biri-Biri"
Chart (2023–2024)	Peak position
Japan (Oricon)	4
Japan Combined Singles (Oricon)	19
Japan Anime Singles (Oricon)	1
Japan Hot 100 (Billboard)	14
US World Digital Song Sales (Billboard)	9

=== Monthly charts ===
Monthly chart performance for "Biri-Biri"
Chart (2024)	Position
Japan (Oricon)	21
Japan Anime Singles (Oricon)	6

== Release history ==
Release dates and formats for "Biri-Biri"
Region	Date	Format	Label	Ref.
Various	November 18, 2023	Digital download; streaming	Sony Japan	
Japan	March 13, 2024	CD single; 12-inch vinyl	Sony Japan	
