= Monotone (song) =

Single by Yoasobi

from the EP The Book For,
- Language: Japanese
- Released: October 1, 2024
- Genre: Pop
- Length: 3:30
- Label: Echoes; Sony Japan
- Songwriter: Ayase
- Producer: Ayase

Yoasobi singles chronology
"Butai ni Tatte" (2024)	"Monotone" (2024)	"New Me" (2024)

Music video
- "Monotone" on YouTube

"Monotone" (Japanese: モノトーン, Hepburn: Monotōn) is a song by Japanese duo Yoasobi from their fourth EP, The Book For, (2026). It was released as a single on October 1, 2024, through Echoes and Sony Music Entertainment Japan and served as a theme for the 2024 Japanese animated film Fureru. The song was written by Ayase and was based on the short story Fureru. no, Zen'ya. written by the film's writer Mari Okada.

== Background and release ==
The animated film Fureru, directed by Tatsuyuki Nagai and written by Mari Okada, was first announced in December 2023. Alongside casts and premiere date, on July 5, 2024, the film unveiled the accompanied theme song performed by Yoasobi, titled "Monotone", which first featured on the film's first trailer. The CD single was announced on August 23 and released on October 2, including picture book-styled booklet about the legend of the film's titular mysterious creature. The different snippet was later featured on the second trailer on September 4. Nagai revealed in the press release that he believed only Yoasobi could create music with unique lyrics that really "touches" people's heart.

"Monotone" premiered on September 9 on the radio show, Nippon Broadcasting System 70th Anniversary All Night Nippon Music Week, where Yoasobi hosted. On September 24, the duo gave an interview about the theme song at the Fureru special program broadcast via Abema. Shortly after the program ended, Yoasobi announced that the song would be available for digital music and streaming platforms on October 1, the duo's fifth anniversary, as well as the English version the next day, and later included on the duo's English-language EP, E-Side 4 (2026). The original version featured on their fourth Japanese-language EP, The Book For, (2026).

== Composition ==
Fureru writer Mari Okada wrote the short story on which "Monotone" is based, titled Fureru. no, Zen'ya. (ふれる。の、前夜。; lit. 'The Night Before Fureru'). It was first published via the anime official website on September 25, 2024. The song is a pop track with catchy synth obbligato melody that can be found on Yoasobi's songs in early career such as "Yoru ni Kakeru" and "Gunjō". It is centered on the theme of "people are always alone" and the "delicate feelings toward loved ones." According to Yoasobi, the song was inspired by the "relationships between people" depicted in the film, expressing loneliness and feelings of missing someone in one's own life. Writing for Rockin'On Japan, Tomoki Takahashi described that the song's "oriental and rhythmic melodies create a cheerful, yet sad, insane sentiment that even exudes a sense of mystery."

== Music video ==
A music video for "Monotone" premiered on October 1, 2024, at 20:00 JST. Directed by Toshitaka Shinoda and produced by Ijigen Tokyo, the music video depicts the same visuals as the film, showing Fureru and childhood friends Aki, Ryō, and Yūta, that not feature in the film.

== Live performances ==
Yoasobi included "Monotone" on the setlist of their Chō-genjitsu Dome Live, where they performed live for the first time at Kyocera Dome Osaka for the Osaka show on October 26, 2024.

== Track listing ==
- Digital download and streaming
1. "Monotone" (モノトーン) – 3:30
- Digital download and streaming – English version
1. "Monotone" (English version) – 3:30
- CD single
1. "Monotone" – 3:30
2. "Monotone" (English version) – 3:30
3. "Monotone" (movie edit) – 4:41
4. "Monotone" (instrumental) – 3:30

== Credits and personnel ==
- Ayase – songwriter, producer
- Ikura – vocals
- Mari Okada – based story writer
- Konnie Aoki – English lyrics
- Takayuki Saitō – vocal recording (original)
- Kunio Nishikawara – vocal recording (English version)
- Masahiko Fukui – mixing
- Hidekazu Sakai – mastering

== Charts ==
Chart performance for "Monotone"
Chart (2024)	Peak position
Japan (Oricon)	16
Japan Combined Singles (Oricon)	24
Japan Anime Singles (Oricon)	5
Japan Hot 100 (Billboard)	22
Japan Hot Animation (Billboard Japan)	5
South Korea Download (Circle)	160

== Release history ==
Release dates and formats for "Monotone"
Region	Date	Format	Version	Label	Ref.
Various	October 1, 2024	Digital download; streaming	Original	Echoes; Sony Japan	
Various	October 2, 2024	Digital download; streaming	English	Echoes; Sony Japan	
Japan	October 2, 2024	CD single	Limited	Echoes; Sony Japan	
