= Butai ni Tatte =

Single by Yoasobi

from the EP The Book For,
- Language: Japanese
- English title: "On the Stage"
- Released: July 26, 2024
- Genre: Guitar rock
- Length: 3:27
- Label: Sony Japan
- Songwriter: Ayase
- Producer: Ayase

Yoasobi singles chronology
"Undead" (2024)	"Butai ni Tatte" (2024)	"Monotone" (2024)

Music video
- "Butai ni Tatte" on YouTube "On the Stage" on YouTube

"Butai ni Tatte" (Japanese: 舞台に立って; lit. 'Standing on the stage') is a song by Japanese duo Yoasobi from their fourth EP, The Book For, (2026). It was released as a single through Sony Music Entertainment Japan on July 26, 2024. The "NHK Sports Theme 2024", the song serves as a theme for NHK's coverage of sports event broadcastings in 2024, as well as the 2024 Summer Olympics and Paralympics.

The song was written by Ayase and based on three short stories by Jun Esaka from three one-shot manga: Taizan 5's Hanareta Futari, Yūki Kirishima's Parallel Lane, and Hirusagari Haruno's Owaranai Deuce. Commercially, "Butai ni Tatte" peaked at number 16 on the Billboard Japan Hot 100, and number 29 on the Oricon Combined Singles Chart.

== Background and release ==
On May 22, 2024, NHK announced that Yoasobi would be in charge of "NHK Sports Theme 2024", a song using for the broadcaster's coverage of sports event broadcastings in 2024, including the 2024 Summer Olympics and Paralympics, taking place in Paris, France. The song's title "Butai ni Tatte" was revealed on June 27. It debuted on the 108th Japan Championships in Athletics broadcasting the next day, featuring the montage of Japanese athletes in various sports.

The song was available for digital music and streaming platforms on July 26, 2024, in conjunction with the Summer Olympics opening ceremony. and later featured on the duo's fourth Japanese-language EP, The Book For, (2026). The English version of the song, titled "On the Stage", was released on August 11, 2024, the same day as the last day of competition and the closing ceremony, and included on the duo's English-language EP, E-Side 4 (2026).

== Based stories ==
The song was based on three short stories written by Jun Esaka, sourced from three sport-themed one-shot manga: Hanareta Futari (はなれたふたり; lit. 'Separated two of us') by Taizan 5, Parallel Lane (パラレルレーン, Parareru Rēn) by Yūki Kirishima, and Owaranai Deuce (終わらないデュース, Owaranai Dyūsu; lit. 'Endless deuce') by Hirusagari Haruno. All manga were published digitally via manga platform Shōnen Jump+ between July 26 and 28, respectively.

The first, Hanareta Futari, is about the changing relationship after attending high school between Kotaro and Subaru, who have been playing in goalkeeper and striker positions, respectively, in the same football team since elementary school. Next, Parallel Lane expresses the swimmer Ren Natsunagi losing his right leg due to a traffic accident, making him depressed. He meets Ibuki Samejima, who was born physically disabled, who transfers to his class. Ibuki inspired him to become "the world's best para swimmer". Owaranai Deuce depicts the women's singles tennis world championship between world-famous Merle Angelica and Ichi Yamada, with a 100-time deuce score.

== Composition ==
Musically, "Butai ni Tatte" is described as a guitar rock track about conflicts, excitements, struggles, and hopes that athletes face in their mind to take a courageous step forward, which compares to their artist career. In Yoasobi's News Watch 9 interview on July 5, 2024, Ayase told that he imagined a slightly lighter shade of blue for the song, expressing "sometimes it is sweat and tears, or the struggle to reach something, which I think is very youthful, regardless of era or age." Writing for Real Sound, Eriko Ishii called the song's sound "surprisingly straightforward, almost like a standard for youth rock bands."

== Commercial performance ==
"Butai ni Tatte" topped on the Oricon Digital Singles for the issue dated August 5, 2024, with 11,236 digital sales, becoming their 14th song to top the chart and the second most number-one song on the chart at that time (14), behind only Kenshi Yonezu (15). The song debuted at number 43 on the Billboard Japan Hot 100 dated July 31 with three-day tracking period, and rose to number 16 the next week. For its component charts, the song reached number one on the Download Songs with 10,735 downloads, and number 35 on the Streaming Songs.

== Music video ==
An accompanying music video for "Butai ni Tatte" was first previewed on July 26, 2024, before premiere on August 6 at 20:00 JST. Directed by Margt of Perimetron, the animated visual depicts the protagonist keep running with determination, facing forward, difficulties, and setbacks along the way. It also features athletes in various sports, including from Hanareta Futari, Parallel Lane, and Owaranai Deuce. The music video for the English version was uploaded on August 11.

== Live performances ==
Yoasobi included "Butai ni Tatter" on the setlist of their Chō-genjitsu Dome Live, where they debuted the performance at Kyocera Dome Osaka for the Osaka show on October 26, 2024.

== Other uses ==
"Butai ni Tatte" featured on the Tokyo Projection Mapping Project's "Tokyo Night & Light" projection mapping created by Kuma!, starting on July 26, 2024, at the exterior of the Tokyo Metropolitan Government Building No. 1, Shinjuku. The song featured as a jingle on commercials for Haruyama suits, starring Fumiya Takahashi and Natsuki Deguchi; and Samsung Galaxy S25 Ultra, which the first two shows audience using the smartphone filming the performance of the song at the Chō-genjitsu Asia Tour in Singapore, and the other one expresses the singer-songwriter Unas trying to perform "Butai ni Tatte" on the skyway during noise.

== Track listing ==
- Digital download and streaming
1. "Butai ni Tatte" (舞台に立って) – 3:27
- Digital download and streaming – English version
1. "On the Stage" – 3:27

== Credits and personnel ==
- Ayase – writer, producer
- Ikura – vocals
- Konnie Aoki – English lyrics
- Rockwell – guitar
- Jun Esaka – based story writer
- Takayuki Saitō – vocal recording
- Masahiko Fukui – mixing
- Hidekazu Sakai – mastering

== Charts ==
=== Weekly charts ===
Weekly chart performance for "Butai ni Tatte"
Chart (2024)	Peak position
Japan Combined Singles (Oricon)	29
Japan Hot 100 (Billboard)	16

=== Year-end charts ===
Year-end chart performance for "Butai ni Tatte"
Chart (2024)	Position
Japan Download Songs (Billboard Japan)	40

== Certifications ==
Certifications for "Butai ni Tatte"
Region	Certification	Certified units/sales
Streaming
Japan (RIAJ)	Gold	50,000,000^{†}
^{†} Streaming-only figures based on certification alone.

== Release history ==
Release dates and formats for "Butai ni Tatte"
Region	Date	Format	Version	Label	Ref.
Various	July 27, 2024	Digital download; streaming	Original	Sony Japan	
Various	August 11, 2024	Digital download; streaming	English	Sony Japan	
