= Heart Beat (Yoasobi song) =

Single by Yoasobi

from the EP The Book For,
- Language: Japanese
- Released: December 26, 2023
- Genre: J-pop
- Length: 5:35
- Label: Sony Japan
- Songwriter: Ayase
- Producer: Ayase

Yoasobi singles chronology
"Biri-Biri" (2023)	"Heart Beat" (2023)	"Undead" (2024)

Music video
- "Heart Beat" on YouTube; English version on YouTube

"Heart Beat" is a song by Japanese duo Yoasobi, taken from their fourth EP, The Book For, (2026). It was released as a single on December 26, 2023, by Sony Music Entertainment Japan, and served as the theme for the seventh iteration of the annual television special, 18Fes. Under the theme of "heartbeat", the song was written by Ayase and based on messages, essays, and video submissions from the program's 1,000 teenage participants.

== Background and composition ==
On June 12, 2023, NHK announced the seventh iteration of television special 18Fes collaborated with Yoasobi, where they solicited message or performance videos under the theme of "heartbeat" from 1,000 teenagers between 17 and 20 years old in Japan, to create music based on those videos, scheduled for filming in November with those teenagers. Shortly after the broadcast the day before, the song, titled "Heart Beat" was available for digital music and streaming platforms on December 26. Lyrically, the song shows positive feelings and attitudes of trying new things to move forward despite the anxiety inside. The English version was included on the duo's English-language EP, E-Side 4 (2026), and the original version on their fourth Japanese-language EP, The Book For, (2026).

== Music video ==
An accompanying music video for "Heart Beat" premiered on December 26, 2023, the same day as the release, at 20:00 JST. Directed by Atsushi Makino, who previously directed the duo's "Gunjō" music video (2020), it depicts facing yourself, while struggling to find true identity via puppet show and blacklights. The English version's music video was uploaded on April 26, 2026.

== Live performances and other uses ==
Yoasobi gave the debut performance of "Heart Beat" at 18Fes on December 25, alongside band members and 1,000 selected teenagers. Besides 18Fes, Yoasobi included the song on the setlist for their Pop Out Zepp Tour. Since February 2024, Mizuho Bank used "Heart Beat" for the "New Life Support" advertising campaign by a music video illustrated by manga artist Tina Yamashina, which first premiered on screens at Shibuya Crossing, as well as television advertisement. From January to March 2025, "Heart Beat" featured at the duo's exhibition, Semiconductors Create New Realities, at Ginza Sony Park.

== Credits and personnel ==
- Ayase – writer, producer
- Ikura – vocals
- Konnie Aoki – English version lyrics
- 18Fes participants – based story writer, chorus
- Plusonica (Note: Consisting of Miku Motomatsu, Kuu, Hikaru Narue, Iyo, Kantarō, Atsuya Nagitoro, and Rayta) – chorus
- Chloe Kibble – chorus (English version)
- Ebony Bowens – chorus (English version)
- Imani J Dawson – chorus (English version)
- Marrista Stubbs – chorus (English version)
- Awai Baptiste – chorus (English version)
- Neil Fandel – chorus (English version)
- Drew – chorus (English version)
- Christian Hatcher – chorus (English version)
- Yukiko Tanaka – chorus arrangement
- Atsushi Makino – cover artwork design, music video
- Takayuki Saitō – vocal recording
- Masahiko Fukui – mixing
- Hidekazu Sakai – mastering

== Charts ==
Chart performance for "Heart Beat"
Chart (2024)	Peak position
Japan Combined Singles (Oricon)	47
Japan Hot 100 (Billboard)	33

== Release history ==
Release dates and formats for "Heart Beat"
Region	Date	Format	Label	Ref.
Various	December 26, 2023	Digital download; streaming	Sony Japan	
