= Undead (Yoasobi song) =

Single by Yoasobi

from the EP The Book For,
- Language: Japanese
- Released: July 1, 2024
- Genre: EDM
- Length: 3:02
- Label: Sony Japan
- Songwriter: Ayase
- Producer: Ayase

Yoasobi singles chronology
"Heart Beat" (2023)	"Undead" (2024)	"Butai ni Tatte" (2024)

Music video
- "Undead" on YouTube; English version on YouTube

"Undead" is a song by Japanese duo Yoasobi from their fourth EP, The Book For, (2026), released as a single on July 1, 2024, by Sony Music Entertainment Japan, serving as the theme (Note: "Undead" is sometimes considered as ending theme, as it features on the anime's end credits.) for the 2024 original net animation Monogatari: Off & Monster Season. Written by Ayase, the song was based on Monogatari writer Nisio Isin's short stories Nadeko Past and Shinobu Future. Commercially, "Undead" reached number ten on the Billboard Japan Hot 100 and number 14 on the Oricon Combined Singles Chart, and received streaming double platinum and download gold certifications from the Recording Industry Association of Japan (RIAJ).

== Background and release ==
In January 2024, an anime adaptation of two sagas of light novel series Monogatari—"Off" and "Monster" seasons—was announced, set to premiere in the same year. Later, on May 1, the official website of the anime series teased the upcoming announcement by countdown with an image of the letter "Y" on a red-pink background, as well as posted the image by the official X (formerly Twitter) account for the writer Nisio Isin's anime project. The next day, the anime series confirmed that Yoasobi would perform the theme song for Monogatari Series: Off & Monster Season, titled "Undead".

In the press release, Ayase stated: "The Monogatari series has such a strong attachment to me that when asked about my favorite anime, I always answers Bakemonogatari." He also revealed in a Comic Natalie interview that he wrote the song about the Monogatari character Hitagi Senjōgahara when he was 18–19 and often performed it live with his rock band. A snippet of the song was previewed via the trailer of the anime's first two arcs Orokamonogatari and Nademonogatari on May 3. Two months later, on June 24, the duo additionally teased the song via their social media. Five days later, they revealed the song's release date, to be July 1, 2024, and its cover artwork, featuring the character Yotsugi Ononoki making a V sign with both hands. The song later featured on the duo's fourth Japanese-language EP, The Book For, (2026). The English version was released on February 28, 2025, and included on the duo's English-language EP, E-Side 4 (2026).

== Lyrics and composition ==
"Undead" was sourced from two short stories written by Nisio, Nadeko Past (なでこパスト) and Shinobu Future (しのぶフューチャー), published on the anime's website on July 1, 2024, the same day as the song release. Both stories told the Monogatari characters Nadeko Sengoku and Shinobu Oshino lying on a sofa and receiving counseling from Yotsugi Ononoki about their nervousness. Ayase compared the short stories to his mental gloom at the time he wrote about his musical novelty losing, and questioning himself about what happiness and life is following burning out after the success of the duo's 2023 single "Idol".

Musically, "Undead" is an EDM track that was composed the "danceable and very bright" music based on the image of Monogatari as a whole, rather than the short stories. Tomoyuki Mori from Real Sound described it as a "perfect blend of kick and bass that reaches deep into the body," the track that "intertwines brilliant and sharp synth phrases," and the inorganic melody that reminisces about early Vocaloid music. Lyrically, the song talks about living the lives to the fullest in the present without being bound by the past or the future.

== Commercial performance ==
"Undead" debuted at number two on the Oricon Digital Singles Chart for the issue dated July 15, 2024, with 18,199 digital sales, behind Be:First and Ateez's "Hush-Hush", and peaked at number 14 on the Combined Singles Chart. For Billboard Japan charts, the song entered the Japan Hot 100 dated July 10 at number ten. It also landed at number two on the component Download Songs and number 17 on the Streaming Songs, earning 17,284 downloads and 4,791,166 streams in its first week. The latter later peaked at number 13. Additionally, "Undead" debuted at number four on the specific-genre Hot Animation chart. The Recording Industry Association of Japan (RIAJ) certified "Undead" double platinum for 200 million streams and gold for 100,000 downloads.

== Music video ==
An accompanying music video for "Undead" premiered on September 14, 2024, at 22:30 JST. Toshitaka Shinoda of Ijigen Tokyo directed it, featuring characters from Monogatari: Off & Monster Season, with the footages including the ending sequence. It surpassed 100 million views in June 2026. The music video for the English version was uploaded on February 28, 2025.

== Live performances and other uses ==
Yoasobi included "Undead" in the Yoasobi Live in the USA setlist in New York City and Boston. The duo debuted the live performance of "Undead" on August 6, 2024, at Radio City Music Hall, New York City. The song also appeared on the setlist for the duo's Chō-genjitsu Dome Live, etc.

On May 12, 2025, Lil League from Exile Tribe performed a newly created choreography for "Undead" at CDTV Live! Live!. In July 2025, the song was used on the Suntory Draft Beer commercial as part of "Yoasobeer Project", starring comedian group Daw90000's Hasumi Shō, Shōta Sonoda, and Yūta Uehara.

== Accolades ==
Awards and nominations for "Undead"
Ceremony	Year	Award	Result	Ref.
Anime Grand Prix	2025	Best Theme Song	10th place	

== Track listing ==
- Digital download and streaming
1. "Undead" – 3:02
- Digital download and streaming – English version
1. "Undead" (English version) – 3:02

== Credits and personnel ==
- Ayase – writer, producer, sampler, keyboards
- Ikura – vocals
- Konnie Aoki – background chorus lyrics, English version lyrics
- Haley Lewis – background chorus
- Missy Suzuki – background chorus
- Leona Ortiz – background chorus
- Dylan Ortiz – background chorus
- Jonas Whitaker – background chorus
- Satoru Taguchi – guitar
- Nisio Isin – based story writer
- Takayuki Saitō – vocal recording
- Masahiko Fukui – mixing
- Hidekazu Sakai – mastering

== Charts ==
=== Weekly charts ===
Weekly chart performance for "Undead"
Chart (2024)	Peak position
Global Excl. US (Billboard)	181
Japan Combined Singles (Oricon)	14
Japan Hot 100 (Billboard)	10
Japan Hot Animation (Billboard Japan)	4

=== Year-end charts ===
2024 year-end chart performance for "Undead"
Chart (2024)	Position
Japan Download Songs (Billboard Japan)	35

2025 year-end chart performance for "Undead"
Chart (2025)	Position
Japan Hot 100 (Billboard)	31
Japan Hot Animation (Billboard Japan)	12

== Certifications ==
Certifications for "Undead"
Region	Certification	Certified units/sales
Japan (RIAJ) Digital	Gold	100,000^{*}
Streaming
Japan (RIAJ)	2× Platinum	200,000,000^{†}
^{*} Sales figures based on certification alone.^{†} Streaming-only figures based on certification alone.

== Release history ==
Release dates and formats for "Undead"
Region	Date	Format	Version	Label	Ref.
Various	July 1, 2024	Digital download; streaming	Original	Sony Japan	
Various	February 28, 2025	Digital download; streaming	English	Echoes; Sony Japan	
