= Yūsha (song) =

Single by Yoasobi

from the EP The Book 3
- Language: Japanese
- English title: "The Brave"
- Released: September 29, 2023
- Genre: J-pop; anime song
- Length: 3:14
- Label: Sony Japan
- Songwriter: Ayase
- Producer: Ayase

Yoasobi singles chronology
"Idol" (2023)	"Yūsha" (2023)	"Biri-Biri" (2023)

Alternative cover
- Limited CD single cover

Music video
- "Yūsha" on YouTube "The Brave" on YouTube

"Yūsha" (Japanese: 勇者; lit. 'Hero'; alternatively titled "The Brave" in English) is a song by Japanese duo Yoasobi from their third EP, The Book 3 (2023). It was released as a single by Sony Music Entertainment Japan on September 29, 2023, serving as the first opening theme for the 2023 Japanese anime series Frieren: Beyond Journey's End.

Written by Ayase and based on the short story Fanfare for Frieren written by Jirō Kiso, the song expresses the protagonist Frieren's emotions and memories towards the hero Himmel. Commercially, "Yūsha" peaked at number two on the Billboard Japan Hot 100, and number three on the Oricon Combined Singles Chart, and was certified triple platinum for streaming by the Recording Industry Association of Japan (RIAJ).

== Background and release ==
In September 2022, an anime adaptation of manga series by Kanehito Yamada and Tsukasa Abe, Frieren: Beyond Journey's End, was first announced. One year later, on September 1, 2023, the anime released the third trailer, teasing its first opening and ending themes, "Yūsha" by Yoasobi and "Anytime Anywhere" by Milet, respectively. On the same day, the duo also announced their third EP The Book 3, set to be released on October 4, which "Yūsha" appears as the first track.

Before the release of "Yūsha", Yoasobi, alongside Milet, appeared via a screen at the completed screening event of Frieren: Beyond Journey's End on September 23, talking about the themes. On September 27, the duo announced that the song would be released as a single to digital music and streaming platforms the next two days, the same day as the two-hour first four episodes premiere. The buried treasure-styled limited CD single was released on December 13, including the English version, "The Brave", translated by Konnie Aoki, which was released ahead of on November 24, and appeared on the duo's third English-language EP E-Side 3, released on April 12, 2024.

== Lyrics and composition ==
A source for "Yūsha" is the short story Fanfare for Frieren (奏送, Sōsō), written by Jirō Kiso and supervised by the manga writer Yamada. It tells about protagonist Frieren visiting a small town called "Music City" five years after the death of the hero Himmel. She receives a difficult request from an old woman whom she meets in a place filled with music.

Despite funky and upbeat sounds, "Yūsha" incorporates the main character Frieren's emotional changes and memories towards the hero Himmel, expressing the anime's lonely and melancholy atmosphere. Originally, the opening theme would focus on the worldview of Frieren's journey, but Ayase and Shuya Yamamoto, the duo's creative director, were not satisfied due to the song's "little too much emphasis on the atmosphere". So, Ayase decided to rework the song though he submitted the song to the anime team.

== Critical reception ==
Rockin'On Japan's Mie Sugiura praised "Yūsha" for the structure expressing the story of Frieren: Beyond Journey's End itself densely and interpreted to have a connection with Yoasobi's 2022 single "Shukufuku", an opening theme for Mobile Suit Gundam: The Witch from Mercury, highlighting the "meaning of life" and "the miracle that we have met". Writing for Real Sound, Eriko Ishii admired the lyrics that look like the words popping out one after another from the anime's story and oriental-styled phrase. She also praised Ikura's vocals, which "keeps running to the next melody without leaving any trace, and conveys a tremendous sense of speed, independent of the actual tempo." The Nerd Stash ranked the song as the sixth-best anime opening song in 2023.

== Commercial performance ==
With three days of tracking, "Yūsha" debuted at number nine on the Billboard Japan Hot 100 for the issue dated October 4, 2023, with 22,086 digital sales, 2,426,245 streams, and 5.2 million video views. In its full-tracking second week, the song ascended the peak at number two, behind only Ado's "Show". The song's digital sales slightly decreased to 21,267 units, while the audio streams and video views were increased to 8,139,175 and 9 million, respectively. The song also peaked at number one on the component Download Songs for two consecutive weeks, and number four on the Streaming Songs. Additionally, the song landed at number four on the Hot Animation and ascended to number one the next week.

For Oricon charts, "Yūsha" entered the Digital Singles (Single Track) Chart at number one for the issue dated October 9, 2023, with 25,958 downloads, becoming Yoasobi's thirteen chart-topper, the second most behind only Kenshi Yonezu (14); and topped the chart for three-consecutive weeks. The song also peaked at number four on the Streaming, number three on the Combined Singles, and number seven on the physical Singles Charts. As of August 2026, "Yūsha" received triple platinum certification from the Recording Industry Association of Japan (RIAJ), surpassing 300 million on-demand streams in Japan.

== Music video ==
An accompanying music video for "Yūsha" premiered on September 29, 2023, at 23:00 JST, shortly after the first four episodes of Frieren: Beyond Journey's End premiere. It was directed by Keiichirō Saitō, and produced by Madhouse studio, who both worked on the anime. The visual depicts an adventure by the heroic group consisting of Frieren, hero Himmel, warrior Eisen, and priest Heiter, using the same visuals as the anime. As of February 2025, it reached 200 million views. The music video of the English version was uploaded on November 24.

== Promotion and other uses ==
To promote "Yūsha" alongside the anime, Yoasobi gave interviews at news programs Zip!, and News Every, as well as the November edition of Oggi, and the 2024 second issue of Weekly Shōnen Sunday magazines. The duo gave the debut performance of "Yūsha" at music festival Nex_Fest on November 3, 2023. The song was added to the setlist for the opening act at British rock band Coldplay's Music of the Spheres World Tour in Tokyo, and the duo's 2023–2024 first Asia Tour, Pop Out Zepp Tour, and Coachella, etc. The duo performed "Yūsha" on television for the first time at the special two-hour debut episode of With Music. "Yūsha" was added to the video game Fortnite Festival in December 2024.

== Accolades ==
Awards and nominations for "Yūsha"
Ceremony	Year	Award	Result	Ref.
AnimaniA Awards	2024	Best Anime Song	Nominated	
Anime Grand Prix	2024	Best Theme Song	6th place	
Anime Trending Awards	2025	Opening Theme Song of the Year	Nominated	
Asian Pop Music Awards	2023	Best OST	Nominated	
Crunchyroll Anime Awards	2025	Best Anime Song	Nominated	

== Track listing ==
- Digital download and streaming
1. "Yūsha" (勇者) – 3:14
- Digital download and streaming – English version
1. "The Brave" – 3:14
- CD single
1. "Yūsha" – 3:14
2. "The Brave" – 3:14
3. "Yūsha" (anime edit) – 1:32
4. "Yūsha" (instrumental) – 3:14

== Credits and personnel ==
- Ayase – writer, producer
- Ikura – vocals
- Jirō Kiso – based story writer
- Konnie Aoki – background chorus lyrics, English lyrics
- Imani J. Dawson – background chorus
- Ebony Bowens – background chorus
- Mimiko Goldstein – background chorus
- Marrista – background chorus
- Sofia Ray – background chorus
- Shore Cienna – background chorus
- Haley Lewis – background chorus
- Jonas Gen Whitaker – background chorus
- Missy Suzuki – background chorus
- Ivy – background chorus
- Velvet – background chorus
- Emily – background chorus
- Takayuki Saitō – vocal recording
- Kunio Nishikawara – background chorus recording
- Yūki Iwata – background chorus recording
- Masahiko Fukui – mixing
- Hidekazu Sakai – mastering

== Charts ==
=== Weekly charts ===
Weekly chart performance for "Yūsha"
Chart (2023)	Peak position
Global 200 (Billboard)	63
Hong Kong (Billboard)	13
Japan (Oricon)	7
Japan Combined Singles (Oricon)	3
Japan Anime Singles (Oricon)	2
Japan Hot 100 (Billboard)	2
Japan Hot Animation (Billboard Japan)	1
Taiwan (Billboard)	4
US World Digital Song Sales (Billboard)	9

Weekly chart performance for "The Brave"
Chart (2023)	Peak position
Japan Digital Singles (Oricon)	22

=== Monthly charts ===
Monthly chart performance for "Yūsha"
Chart (2023)	Position
Japan (Oricon)	19
Japan Anime Singles (Oricon)	4

=== Year-end charts ===
2023 year-end chart performance for "Yūsha"
Chart (2023)	Position
Japan Digital Singles (Oricon)	6
Japan Hot 100 (Billboard)	81
Japan Hot Animation (Billboard Japan)	16

2024 year-end chart performance for "Yūsha"
Chart (2024)	Position
Japan Hot 100 (Billboard)	14
Japan Hot Animation (Billboard Japan)	6

== Certifications and sales ==
Certifications and sales for "Yūsha"
Region	Certification	Certified units/sales
Japan Physical	—	17,792
Japan (RIAJ) Digital	Gold	100,000^{*}
Streaming
Japan (RIAJ)	3× Platinum	300,000,000^{†}
^{*} Sales figures based on certification alone.^{†} Streaming-only figures based on certification alone.

== Release history ==
Release dates and formats for "Yūsha"
Region	Date	Format	Version	Label	Ref.
Various	September 29, 2023	Digital download; streaming	Original	Sony Japan	
Various	November 24, 2023	Digital download; streaming	English	Sony Japan	
Japan	December 13, 2023	CD single	Limited	Sony Japan	
Taiwan	December 29, 2023	CD single	Limited	Sony Taiwan	
