= Shukufuku =

2022 single by Yoasobi

Single by Yoasobi

from the EP The Book 3
- Language: Japanese
- English title: "The Blessing"
- Released: October 1, 2022
- Genre: Electropop; dance-pop
- Length: 3:16
- Label: Sony Japan
- Songwriter: Ayase
- Producer: Ayase

Yoasobi singles chronology
"Suki da" (2022)	"Shukufuku" (2022)	"Umi no Manimani" (2022)

Alternative cover
- Limited CD single cover

Music video
- "Shukufuku" on YouTube "The Blessing" on YouTube

"Shukufuku" (祝福; lit. "Blessing", alternatively titled "The Blessing" in English) is a song by Japanese duo Yoasobi from their third EP, The Book 3 (2023). It was released as a single on October 1, 2022, by Sony Music Entertainment Japan, served as the opening theme of the first season of the Japanese mecha anime series Mobile Suit Gundam: The Witch from Mercury (2022).

The song was based on the Mobile Suit Gundam: The Witch from Mercury writer Ichirō Ōkouchi's short story Yurikago no Hoshi, depicting the perspective of XVX-016 Gundam Aerial to Suletta Mercury. It peaked at number three on the Oricon Combined Singles Chart, and number two on the Billboard Japan Hot 100, and was certified platinum for downloads and triple platinum for streaming by the Recording Industry Association of Japan (RIAJ).

== Background and release ==
Starting on September 2, 2022, Yoasobi uploaded three mysterious teaser images of the unknown black shape with a white background featuring the text "941", "730", and "Coming Soon!!!" for three days. (Note: Later signifying the Mobile Suit Gundam: The Witch from Mercury emblem) Two days later, the second promotional video of the Japanese mecha anime series Mobile Suit Gundam: The Witch from Mercury was announced, revealing that Yoasobi would be handling its opening theme "Shukufuku". The song was based on Yurikago no Hoshi (ゆりかごの星; lit. "Cradle Planet"), a short story written by Ichirō Ōkouchi, who is also in charge of writing the anime. The story was published on the anime's official website on October 2.

The anime edit version of "Shukufuku" was unveiled on September 16 on the special radio show All Night Nippon Music Week, which the duo hosted for one night only to commemorate the 55th anniversary of All Night Nippon. The digital cover artwork was unveiled on September 25. The song was available for digital music and streaming platforms on October 1, one day before the anime's first episode premiere. The music video, directed by Nobutaka Yoda with animation direction by Yutaro Kubo, premiered via the duo's YouTube channel the next day. It portrays the same visuals as the anime but is "warmer" than the main theme.

A limited CD single of "Shukufuku" was subsequently issued on December 9, including the English version titled "The Blessing", the anime edit version, and the instrumental version, its based novel, original Gunpla Demi-Trainer, and XVX-016 Gundam Aerial decal in an exclusive collaboration with the duo. Yoasobi shared the snippet of the song recorded the English on November 3 after the music video surpassed 10 million views. The English version was released digitally as a standalone single on the same day as the CD single, and included on the duo's second English-language EP E-Side 2, released on November 18. The anime edit version later featured on the soundtrack album to the anime, while the full version appeared on the duo's third EP The Book 3, released on October 4, 2023.

== Composition and reception ==
"Shukufuku" is an electropop and dance-pop song with "catchy" melodies and "throbbing" beats, written and produced by Ayase, a half of the duo. It depicts the relationship between the main protagonists Suletta Mercury and her XVX-016 Gundam Aerial, narrated from the perspective of the Gundam, fighting alongside their host and watching her lead-up to the events of the anime and reminding "the adherence to and liberation from oppression." It was composed in the key of E minor, 170 beats per minute with a running time of three minutes and 16 seconds.

Real Sound's Tsuki no Hito described the composition of "Shukufuku" that "the piano sound is gorgeous, and the arrangement is full of sprinting, but the uneasiness hidden throughout the phrase has a thrilling feel suitable for Gundam works with many battle scenes," while said that "the sound image [of "Shukufuku"] coexists suppleness, beauty, and strength, highlighting the world view of The Witch from Mercury while vividly demonstrating Yoasobi's innovation." Nahda Nabiilah from Game Rant praised the song as "providing an upbeat tune that can raise the listener's energy and build up their enthusiasm to start the anime episodes." Writing for Rockin'On Japan, Fumiaki Amano compared "Shukufuku" that "may be as close as possible to what lies between Ayase and Ikura", likening "Yoasobi's theme song".

== Commercial performance ==
With two days of tracking, "Shukufuku" debuted at number 14 on the Billboard Japan Hot 100 in the chart issue dated October 5, 2022, with 23,298 units, charted on the Download Songs at number two. The next week, the song surged up 12 spots to number two after its first full week of tracking, behind SKE48's "Zettai Inspiration". It earned 30,499 downloads, landed at number one on the Download Songs; 6,203,733 streams, debuted at number seven on the Streaming Songs; and 1,397,032 video views. For the specific-genre Hot Animation chart, "Shukufuku" debuted at number seven and ascended to number one the following week. Upon the CD single release, Billboard Japan reported that "Shukufuku" sold 24,926 copies for its first week, debuted at number four on the Top Singles Sales chart.

For Oricon charts, "Shukufuku" entered the Combined Singles Chart for the issue dated October 10 at number 23, and ascended to number three the following week. The song debuted at number two on the Digital Singles Chart, selling 26,736 units. Then, it peaked at number one the chart on the week of October 17 with 34,563 units, becoming the tenth number-one song on the chart. The single also peaked at number six on the Streaming Chart issue dated October 17, collected 6,390,883 streams. Following the release of its CD single, "Shukufuku" landed at number three on the Oricon Singles Chart and number one on the Anime Singles Chart of November 21 with 23,845 CD sales. Internationally, the song debuted at number 76, 27, and 12 on the Billboard Global 200, Global Excl. U.S, and Hits of the World's Hong Kong Songs, respectively. "Shukufuku" was certified platinum for download figures and triple platinum for streaming by the Recording Industry Association of Japan (RIAJ).

== Live performances and covers ==
Yoasobi gave a debut performance of "Shukufuku" at the two-hour special edition of CDTV Live! Live! on November 7, 2022, shot at Gundam Factory Yokohama. The members and the band performed in front of an 18-meter life-size movable Gundam statue. The song was included on the setlist of their concert tours Denkōsekka Arena Tour, and 2023–2024 first Asia Tour. Yoasobi also performed the song at several music festivals since 2022, such as Head in the Clouds Festival, Unibaru! Live 2023, and Rock in Japan Festival, etc. Japanese voice actress Lynn covered "Shukufuku", uploaded on her YouTube channel and released to music streaming platform on February 28, 2024.

== Accolades ==
Awards and nominations for "Shukufuku"
Ceremony	Year	Award	Result	Ref.
Anime Grand Prix	2023	Best Anime Song	2nd place	
Anime Trending Awards	2023	Opening Theme Song of the Year	Nominated	
Newtype Anime Awards	2023	Best Theme Song	3rd place	
Reiwa Anisong Awards	2022	Best Work Award	Nominated	

== Track listing ==
- Digital download / streaming
1. "Shukufuku" (祝福) – 3:16
- Digital download / streaming – English version
1. "The Blessing" (English version) – 3:13
- CD single
1. "Shukufuku" – 3:14
2. "The Blessing" (English version) – 3:14
3. "Shukufuku" (anime edit) – 1:30
4. "Shukufuku" (instrumental) – 3:12

== Credits and personnel ==
- Ayase – songwriter, producer
- Ikura – vocals
- Konnie Aoki – English version translator
- Ichirō Ōkouchi – based story writer
- Takeruru – guitar
- Hikaru Yamamoto – bass
- Ichirō Ōkouchi – based story writer
- Takayuki Saitō – vocal recording
- Masahiko Fukui – mixing
- Hidekazu Sakai – mastering

== Charts ==
=== Weekly charts ===
Weekly chart performance for "Shukufuku"
Chart (2022)	Peak position
Global 200 (Billboard)	76
Hong Kong (Billboard)	12
Japan (Oricon)	3
Japan Combined Singles (Oricon)	3
Japan Anime Singles (Oricon)	1
Japan Hot 100 (Billboard)	2
Japan Hot Animation (Billboard Japan)	1

Weekly chart performance for "The Blessing"
Chart (2022)	Peak position
Japan Digital Singles (Oricon)	25

=== Monthly charts ===
Monthly chart performance for "Shukufuku"
Chart (2022)	Position
Japan (Oricon)	15
Japan Anime Singles (Oricon)	3

=== Year-end charts ===
2022 year-end chart performance for "Shukufuku"
Chart (2022)	Position
Japan Digital Singles (Oricon)	7
Japan Hot 100 (Billboard)	74
Japan Hot Animation (Billboard Japan)	15

2023 year-end chart performance for "Shukufuku"
Chart (2023)	Position
Japan Digital Singles (Oricon)	9
Japan Hot 100 (Billboard)	15
Japan Hot Animation (Billboard Japan)	7

2024 year-end chart performance for "Shukufuku"
Chart (2024)	Position
Japan Hot 100 (Billboard)	75

== Certifications and sales ==
Certifications and sales for "Shukufuku"
Region	Certification	Certified units/sales
Japan Physical	—	25,622
Japan (RIAJ) Digital	Platinum	250,000^{*}
Streaming
Japan (RIAJ)	3× Platinum	300,000,000^{†}
^{*} Sales figures based on certification alone.^{†} Streaming-only figures based on certification alone.

== Release history ==
Release dates and formats for "Shukufuku"
Region	Date	Format	Version	Label	Ref.
Various	October 1, 2022	Digital download; streaming	Original	Sony Japan	
Various	November 9, 2022	Digital download; streaming	English	Sony Japan	
Japan	November 9, 2022	CD single	Limited	Sony Japan	
Taiwan	November 25, 2022	CD single	Limited	Sony Taiwan	
