= Yoasobi discography =

- Yoasobi's official logo
- EPs: 9
- Live albums: 1
- Singles: 35
- Promotional singles: 4
- Video albums: 3
- Music videos: 40

Japanese duo Yoasobi has released nine extended plays (four Japanese and four English), one live album, 35 singles (14 of which were additionally released in English version), four promotional singles, three video albums, and 40 music videos (31 were additionally accompanied by the English version). As of October 2026, the duo has sold 3.5 million certified units across physical and digital formats and earned 5.9 billion certified streams, according to the Recording Industry Association of Japan (RIAJ). In July 2026, Billboard Japan reported that the duo has exceeded 10 billion streams in Japan, the fourth artist to do so, after Mrs. Green Apple, Official Hige Dandism, and Back Number.

Yoasobi's debut single, "Yoru ni Kakeru" (2019), gained massive popularity during the COVID-19 pandemic in Japan. It peaked at number one on both the Oricon Combined Singles Chart and the Billboard Japan Hot 100. For the latter chart, the song stayed at the top for three consecutive weeks and six total weeks, and became the first non-CD single to top the year-end chart. It also became the first diamond and double-diamond track by the RIAJ for surpassing 500 million and one billion streams, respectively. The song was followed by multi-platinum singles: "Ano Yume o Nazotte", "Halzion", "Tabun", "Gunjō", and "Haruka".

The duo's first two EPs, The Book and The Book 2 (2021), reached number two on the Oricon Albums Chart, and the latter topped the Billboard Japan Hot Albums. Their single "Kaibutsu" was Japan's best-selling digital song in 2021. The third EP The Book 3 (2023) includes top-five "Shukufuku", "Idol", and "Yūsha". "Idol" was an immediate commercial success, topping the Japan Hot 100 for 22 weeks (21 were consecutive), the longest-running in the chart history, and the best-performing song of 2023 in Japan. Globally, the song was the first Japanese song to top the Billboard Global Excl. US, and the 19th best-selling song globally in 2023, according to the International Federation of the Phonographic Industry (IFPI). Their fourth EP, The Book For,, was released in June 2026 to conclude The Book series.

In addition to their regular releases, Yoasobi began exploring English-language songs by translating the original Japanese songs. It resulted in EPs, E-Side (2021), E-Side 2 (2022), E-Side 3 (2024), and E-Side 4 (2026). Outside their regular work, the duo also collaborated with four Naoki Prize-winning professional novelists—Rio Shimamoto, Mizuki Tsujimura, Miyuki Miyabe, and Eto Mori—to perform four songs based on their short stories, resulting the book Hajimete no (2022), and its companion EP (2023).

== Extended plays ==
List of extended plays, showing selected details, chart positions, sales, and certifications
Title	Details	Peak positions					Sales	Certifications
Title	Details	JPN	JPN Cmb.	JPN Hot	US Sales	US World	Sales	Certifications
The Book	Released: January 6, 2021; Label: Sony Japan; Formats: CD, LP, DL, streaming	2	2	2	—	—	JPN: 310,000 (Note: Japan physical and digital combined sales figures for The Book)	RIAJ: Gold (phy.); Gold (dig.)
E-Side	Released: November 12, 2021; Label: Sony Japan; Formats: DL, streaming	—	19	9	—	—	JPN: 9,500	
The Book 2	Released: December 1, 2021; Label: Sony Japan; Formats: CD, LP, DL, streaming	2	2	1	—	—	JPN: 203,000 (Note: Japan physical and digital combined sales figures for The Book 2)	RIAJ: Gold (phy.)
E-Side 2	Released: November 18, 2022; Label: Sony Japan; Formats: DL, streaming	—	42	10	—	—	JPN: 5,300	
Hajimete no – EP	Released: May 10, 2023; Label: Sony Japan; Formats: CD+BC, Mini CD, DL, streaming	— (Note: Due to being considered to be a single, Hajimete no – EP did not enter any Oricon album charts, but peaked at number nine on both the Singles and Combined Singles Chart.)	—	— (Note: Due to being considered to be a single, Hajimete no – EP did not enter any Billboard Japan album charts, but peaked at number 12 on the Top Singles Sales.)	—	—	JPN: 11,900	
The Book 3	Released: October 4, 2023; Label: Sony Japan; Formats: CD, LP, DL, streaming	2	2	2	—	—	JPN: 205,000 (Note: Japan physical and digital combined sales figures for The Book 3)	RIAJ: Gold (phy.)
E-Side 3	Released: April 12, 2024; Label: Sony Japan; Formats: DL, streaming	—	—	16	—	—	JPN: 2,800	
E-Side 4	Released: April 24, 2026; Label: Echoes, Sony Japan; Formats: DL, streaming	—	—	—	—	—	JPN: 900	
The Book For,	Released: June 26, 2026; Label: Echoes, Sony Japan; Formats: CD, LP, DL, streaming	7	7	7	40	15	JPN: 50,400 (Note: Japan physical and digital combined sales figures for The Book For,)	
"—" denotes releases that did not chart or were not released in that region.

== Live albums ==
List of live albums, showing selected details, chart positions, and sales
Title	Details	Peaks	Sales
Title	Details	JPN Hot	Sales
Yoasobi 5th Anniversary Dome Live 2024 "Chō-genjitsu" at Tokyo Dome	Released: November 4, 2026; Label: Echoes, Sony Japan; Formats: DL, streaming	32	JPN: 900

== Singles ==
List of singles as lead artist, showing year released, selected chart positions, certifications, and album name
Title	Year	Peak chart positions										Certifications	Album
Title	Year	JPN	JPN Cmb.	JPN Hot	HK	KOR	NZ Hot	SGP	TWN	US World	WW	Certifications	Album
"Yoru ni Kakeru"	2019	—	1	1	13	—	—	— (Note: "Yoru ni Kakeru" did not enter the RIAS Top Streaming Chart, but peaked at number 20 on the Top Regional Chart.)	—	24	16	RIAJ: 3× Platinum (dig.); 2× Diamond (st.); RMNZ: Gold	The Book
"Ano Yume o Nazotte"	2020	—	29	32	—	—	—	—	—	—	—	RIAJ: Gold (dig.); 3× Platinum (st.)	The Book
"Halzion"	2020	—	7	10	—	—	—	—	—	—	— (Note: "Halzion" did not enter the Billboard Global 200, but peaked at number 125 on the Global Excl. US.)	RIAJ: Gold (dig.); 3× Platinum (st.)	The Book
"Tabun"	2020	—	11	15	—	—	—	—	—	—	— (Note: "Tabun" did not enter the Billboard Global 200, but peaked at number 139 on the Global Excl. US.)	RIAJ: Gold (dig.); 2× Platinum (st.)	The Book
"Gunjō"	2020	—	9	6	20	—	—	—	—	14	44	RIAJ: Platinum (dig.); Diamond (st.)	The Book
"Haruka"	2020	—	18	17	—	—	—	—	—	—	— (Note: "Haruka" did not enter the Billboard Global 200, but peaked at number 121 on the Global Excl. US.)	RIAJ: Gold (dig.); 3× Platinum (st.)	The Book
"Kaibutsu"	2021	2	2	2	—	—	—	—	—	12	87	RIAJ: Platinum (dig.); Diamond (st.)	The Book 2
"Yasashii Suisei"	2021	2	2	14	—	—	—	—	—	—	— (Note: "Yasashii Suisei" did not enter the Billboard Global 200, but peaked at number 97 on the Global Excl. US.)	RIAJ: Gold (dig.); Platinum (st.)	The Book 2
"Mō Sukoshi Dake"	2021	—	4	4	—	—	—	—	—	—	103	RIAJ: Gold (dig.); 2× Platinum (st.)	The Book 2
"Sangenshoku"	2021	—	3	4	—	—	—	—	—	—	31	RIAJ: Gold (dig.); 3× Platinum (st.)	The Book 2
"Loveletter"	2021	—	3	4	—	—	—	—	—	—	— (Note: "Loveletter" did not enter the Billboard Global 200, but peaked at number 96 on the Global Excl. US.)	RIAJ: Platinum (st.)	The Book 2
"Taishō Roman"	2021	—	5	2	—	—	—	—	—	—	105	RIAJ: Platinum (st.)	The Book 2
"Tsubame" (featuring Midories)	2021	—	29	19	—	—	—	—	—	—	—	RIAJ: Gold (dig.); Platinum (st.)	The Book 2
"Mr."	2022	—	19	11	—	—	—	—	—	—	— (Note: "Mr." did not enter the Billboard Global 200, but peaked at number 143 on the Global Excl. US.)	RIAJ: Gold (st.)	The Book 3 (Note: "Mr.", "Suki da", "Umi no Manimani", and "Seventeen" also appear on Hajimete no – EP.)
"Suki da"	2022	—	23	8	—	—	—	—	—	—	—	RIAJ: Gold (st.)	The Book 3
"Shukufuku"	2022	3	3	2	12	—	—	—	—	—	76	RIAJ: Platinum (dig.); 3× Platinum (st.)	The Book 3
"Umi no Manimani"	2022	—	—	68	—	—	—	—	—	—	—		The Book 3
"Adventure"	2023	—	48	30	—	—	—	—	—	—	—	RIAJ: Platinum (st.)	The Book 3
"Seventeen"	2023	—	32	21	—	—	—	—	—	—	—	RIAJ: Platinum (st.)	The Book 3
"Idol"	2023	2	1	1	2	68	19	10	2	7	7	RIAJ: 2× Platinum (dig.); Diamond (st.)	The Book 3
"Yūsha"	2023	7	3	2	13	—	—	—	4	9	63	RIAJ: Gold (dig.); 3× Platinum (st.)	The Book 3
"Biri-Biri"	2023	4	19	14	—	—	—	—	—	9	—		The Book For,
"Heart Beat"	2023	—	47	33	—	—	—	—	—	—	—		The Book For,
"Undead"	2024	—	14	10	—	—	—	—	—	—	— (Note: "Undead" did not enter the Billboard Global 200, but peaked at number 181 on the Global Excl. US.)	RIAJ: Gold (dig.); 2× Platinum (st.)	The Book For,
"Butai ni Tatte"	2024	—	29	16	—	—	—	—	—	—	—	RIAJ: Gold (st.)	The Book For,
"Monotone"	2024	16	24	22	—	—	—	—	—	—	—		The Book For,
"New Me"	2024	—	—	40	—	—	—	—	—	—	—		The Book For,
"Players"	2025	—	—	51	—	—	—	—	—	—	—		The Book For,
"Watch Me!"	2025	17	22	16	—	—	—	—	—	—	—		The Book For,
"Gekijō"	2025	—	—	24	—	—	—	—	—	—	—		The Book For,
"Adrena"	2026	19	42	24	—	—	—	—	—	—	—		The Book For,
"Baby"	2026	19	—	58	—	—	—	—	—	—	—		The Book For,
"Orion"	2026	—	—	25	—	—	—	—	—	*	—		The Book For,
"Sakihokore"	2026	—	35	12	—	—	—	—	—	*	—		TBA
"Killa"	2026	—	96	41	—	—	—	—	—	*	—		TBA
"—" denotes releases that did not chart or were not released in that region.

== Promotional singles ==
List of promotional singles, showing year released, selected chart positions, certifications, and album name
Title	Year	Peak positions			Certifications	Album
Title	Year	JPN Cmb.	JPN Hot	WW	Certifications	Album
"Encore"	2021	9	8	177	RIAJ: Gold (dig.); 2× Platinum (st.)	The Book
"Moshi mo Inochi ga Egaketara"	2022	37	35	—	RIAJ: Gold (st.)	The Book 2
"The Noise" (with Le Sserafim)	2025	—	—	—		Non-album promotional single
"Kaishin no Ichigeki"	2025	22	15	—		Dear Jubilee: Radwimps Tribute
"—" denotes releases that did not chart or were not released in that region.

== Guest appearances ==
List of non-single guest appearances, showing year released, other performing artists, and album name
Title	Year	Other artist(s)	Album
"Chūō Freeway"	2023	Yumi Matsutoya	Yuming Kanpai!!: Yumi Matsutoya 50th Anniversary Collaboration Best Album

== Videography ==
=== Video albums ===
List of video albums, showing selected details, chart positions, and sales
Title	Details	Peaks	Sales
Title	Details	JPN BD	Sales
The Film	Released: March 23, 2022; Label: Sony Japan; Formats: BD	1	JPN: 21,000
The Film 2	Released: April 10, 2024; Label: Sony Japan; Formats: BD	1	JPN: 18,900
The Film 3	Released: October 1, 2025; Label: Echoes, Sony Japan; Formats: BD	2	JPN: 13,200

=== Music videos ===
List of music videos, showing year released, and directors
Title	Year	Director(s)	Ref.
"Yoru ni Kakeru"	2019	Nina Ai	
"Ano Yume o Nazotte"	2020	Koron Koronosuke	
"Halzion"	2020	Toshitaka Shinoda	
"Tabun"	2020	Saho Nanjō	
"Gunjō"	2020	Atsushi Makino	
"Haruka"	2020	Kanae Izumi	
"Kaibutsu"	2021	Rina Mitsuzumi	
"Encore"	2021	Bun	
"Yasashii Suisei"	2021	Kōhei Kadowaki	
"Sangenshoku" (Ahamo Special Movie)	2021	Mado Matsumoto	
"Sangenshoku"	2021	Masashi Ishihama	
"Loveletter"	2021	Satoru Ohno	
"Taishō Roman"	2021	Yūsuke Takase	
"Mō Sukoshi Dake"	2021	Hmng	
"Tsubame"	2021	Nina Ai	
"Moshi mo Inochi ga Egaketara"	2021	Asami Kiyokawa	
"Ano Yume o Nazotte" (Ballade version)	2022	Yuta Amano	
"Mr."	2022	Toshitaka Shinoda	
"Shukufuku"	2022	Nobutaka Yoda	
"Suki da"	2022	Kazuaki Seki	
"Adventure"	2023	Jun Tamukai	
"Umi no Manimani"	2023	Asuka Dokai	
"Seventeen"	2023	Masatsugu Nagasoe	
"Idol"	2023	Naoya Nakayama	
"Yūsha"	2023	Keiichirō Saitō	
"Biri-Biri"	2023	Ryō Sasaki	
"Heart Beat"	2023	Atsushi Makino	
"Butai ni Tatte"	2024	Margt	
"Undead"	2024	Toshitaka Shinoda	
"Monotone"	2024	Toshitaka Shinoda	
"New Me"	2024	Havtza	
"Players"	2025	Suzkikenta; Tsuribu Tokyo	
"Watch Me!"	2025	Yū Nakagaito	
"New Me" (English version)	2025	Hana Watanabe	
"Gekijō"	2025	Pennacky	
"The Noise" (with Le Sserafim)	2025	Unknown	
"Adrena"	2026	Tsuribu Tokyo	
"Baby"	2026	Yūhei Sakuragi	
"Orion"	2026	Maco	
"Sakihokore"	2026	Nina Ai; Nobuhide Kariya	

== See also ==
- List of artists who reached number one on the Japan Hot 100
