= Yoasobi Live in the USA =

2024 concert tour by Yoasobi

- Tour by Yoasobi
- Los Angeles and San Francisco promotional poster
- Location: United States
- Start date: April 18, 2024
- End date: August 8, 2024
- Duration: c. 90 minutes
- Legs: 2
- No. of shows: 4
- Attendance: 21,000
- Website: yoasobi-music.jp/live/51960

Yoasobi concert chronology
- Pop Out Zepp Tour (2023–2024); Yoasobi Live in the USA (2024); Chō-genjitsu Dome Live (2024)

The Yoasobi Live in the USA was the second overseas concert tour and fourth overall by Japanese duo Yoasobi. Consisting of four shows, it began in Los Angeles on April 18, 2024, and concluded in Boston on August 8. Like the previous Pop Out Zepp Tour, the concerts featured 3D display by wearing 3D glasses. The tour received 21,000 audiences.

== Background and ticketing ==
Yoasobi first performed in the United States at Head in the Clouds Festival in August 2023 at Pasadena, California, and participated the Coachella Valley Music & Arts Festival in April 2024. In early 2024, Yoasobi announced that they would perform at two major music festivals in the United States–Coachella in April and Lollapalooza in August. On February 21, 2024, Crunchyroll announced that they would sponsor two concert shows in the United States by Yoasobi on April 18 at the Shrine Auditorium and Expo Hall, Los Angeles, and April 21 at the Warfield Theatre, San Francisco. It was reported that the tickets were sold out in 30 minutes.

On April 22, following the conclusion of the San Francisco show, Yoasobi announced two additional shows in the East Coast of the United States in August, the same month as their Lollapalooza performance — at Radio City Music Hall in New York City on August 6 and the MGM Music Hall at Fenway in Boston on August 8. Pre-sales began on April 25 and general ticket sales began the next day.

== Setlist ==
This set list is representative of the show in San Francisco on April 21, 2024. It is not intended to represent all shows.

1. "Seventeen"
2. "Shukufuku"
3. "Halzion"
4. "Suki da"
5. "Ano Yume o Nazotte"
6. "Tabun"
7. "Biri-Biri"
8. "Mr."
9. "Moshi mo Inochi ga Egaketara"
10. "Yasashii Suisei"
11. "Tsubame"
12. "Idol"
13. "Yūsha"
14. "Kaibutsu"
15. "Gunjō"
16. "Heart Beat"

Encore

17. "Yoru ni Kakeru"

Notes

- Starting in New York City, "Undead" replaced "Ano Yume o Nazotte" and was moved to the first song, while "Seventeen" was performed between "Shukufuku" and "Halzion".

== Shows ==
List of concerts, showing date, city, country, venue and attendance
Date (2024)	City	Country	Venue	Attendance
April 18	Los Angeles	United States	Shrine Auditorium and Expo Hall	5,000
April 21	San Francisco	United States	Warfield Theatre	5,000
August 6	New York City	United States	Radio City Music Hall	6,000
August 8	Boston	United States	MGM Music Hall at Fenway	—
Total				21,000

== Personnel ==
Yoasobi

- Ayase – keyboard, synthesizer, sampler
- Ikura – vocals

Band

- Zacro Misohagi – keyboard chorus
- AssH – guitar
- Tatsuya Amano – drums (Los Angeles, San Francisco)
- Honogumo – drums (New York City, Boston)
- Hikaru Yamamoto – bass
