= Idol (Yoasobi song) =

Single by Yoasobi

from the EP The Book 3
- Language: Japanese
- Released: April 12, 2023
- Genre: Bubblegum pop; trap; gothic
- Length: 3:33
- Label: Sony Japan
- Songwriter: Ayase
- Producer: Ayase

Yoasobi singles chronology
"Seventeen" (2023)	"Idol" (2023)	"Yūsha" (2023)

Alternative cover
- Limited CD single cover (Note: The 7-inch vinyl cover features an aquamarine case instead of pink, while the 14-inch has no case.)

Music video
- "Idol" on YouTube; English version on YouTube

"Idol" (Japanese: アイドル, Hepburn: Aidoru) is a song by Japanese duo Yoasobi from their third EP, The Book 3 (2023). It was released as a single on April 12, 2023, through Sony Music Entertainment Japan. The song served as the opening theme to the first season of the 2023 Japanese anime series Oshi no Ko. A bubblegum pop, trap, and gothic track, one half of the duo Ayase wrote "Idol", based on Aka Akasaka's short story 45510. The lyrics depict the two-faced nature of a star in the Japanese idol industry, delineating multiple perspectives on the anime's central character, the idol Ai Hoshino, namely those of her fans and media, her fellow groupmates, and herself. It additionally features shouts by B-boy group Real Akiba Boyz and gospel-like background vocals.

"Idol" received positive reviews from music critics, with particular praise for its representation of the anime's central character. The song was a massive commercial success in Japan and worldwide. It reached the top on the Oricon Combined Singles Chart and Billboard Japan Hot 100, including the 2023 year-end charts. The song topped the Japan Hot 100 for 22 non-consecutive weeks, making it the longest-running number-one in the chart history, and also broke the record for the fastest song to achieve diamond certification, with 500 million streams recorded by the Recording Industry Association of Japan (RIAJ) in 295 days. Globally, "Idol" became the first Japanese-language song to top the Billboard Global Excl. US, and was marked at number seven on the Billboard Global 200, the highest peak by a Japanese act at that time. According to the International Federation of the Phonographic Industry (IFPI), the single was the 19th best-selling song in 2023.

Naoya Nakayama directed the animated music video for "Idol", which premiered on April 13, 2023, and exceeded 100 million views with 35 days, the fastest among Japanese acts. The song won several awards, including Best Animation Video and Song of the Year at the 2023 MTV Video Music Awards Japan, Best Anime Song at the 8th Crunchyroll Anime Awards, Song of the Year in both download and streaming at the 38th Japan Gold Disc Award, Gold Prize at the 2024 and 2025 JASRAC Awards, and Top Global Hit from Japan, Best Anime Song, Best Music Video, and Song of the Year for Creators at the 2025 Music Awards Japan. After numerous domestic and overseas performances, the first Japanese televised performance of "Idol" took place at the 74th NHK Kōhaku Uta Gassen, featuring selected members of the participated Japanese and Korean idol groups, (Note: Seventeen, Nogizaka46, NiziU, Be:First, NewJeans, JO1, Stray Kids, Sakurazaka46, Le Sserafim, and MiSaMo) Ano, Kanna Hashimoto, Real Akiba Boyz, and Avantgardey, which was considered to be the most attracted show of the event.

== Background and release ==
An anime adaptation of manga series Oshi no Ko was announced in June 2022. During a livestream on its official YouTube channel on February 19, 2023, the anime series revealed the opening theme which would be performed by Yoasobi, titled "Idol". As a "super huge" fan of the manga, Ayase had personally read Oshi no Ko before and written a demo about it around 2022. It was initially titled "Kyūkyoku no Ōgi", (Note: Japanese: 究極の奥義, lit. 'Ultimate Secret Techniques') portraying a girl who is the strongest and unbeatable fighter, showing some dark side, reminiscing about Street Fighter character Chun-Li. The demo was originally expected to be released as a Vocaloid song. However, Ayase abandoned the plan after the duo received an offer to perform the opening theme song for Oshi no Ko; he interwove the demo and the new composition to make the final version. The song first previewed on the anime's official trailer, uploaded on February 19, and the full-length song premiered in an extended 90-minute first episode, "Mother and Children", theatrically released on March 17 at selected cinemas in Japan.

After the debut performance of the song at their Denkōsekka Arena Tour on April 5 at Nippon Gaishi Hall, Nagoya, Yoasobi announced that "Idol" would be available on digital music and streaming platforms on April 12, the same date as the anime's televised premiere. A month later, the duo teased a snippet of the English version as a video clip, showing Ikura recording the song in the studio, uploaded via Twitter; the full-length was issued digitally on May 26. The limited CD and 7-inch vinyl of the single were released on June 21 and July 26, respectively; both formats contains the Japanese, English, anime edit, and instrumental versions. Subsequently, "Idol" featured on Yoasobi's third EP The Book 3 (2023), and the English version on their third English-language EP E-Side 3 (2024). Milan Records released the single in 12-inch vinyl, along with the B-side "Tabun", in November 2024.

== Composition and production ==
"Idol" is three minutes and thirty-three seconds long, and combines aspects from pop, hip-hop, rock, and video game music, with a gospel choir-like rendition, rapping, and Japanese idol song-styled interjection, completely departing from Yoasobi's previous style. Fzine described its genre, "a disorienting miasma of bubblegum pop, trap, and gothic orchestrals". Starting with programmed percussion sound, it is driven by the "bright and poppy", "idol-like bubblegum", and "reign of the king" atmosphere-like sounds, and includes "complicated" structure and "dizzying" transitions, such as jazz-funk slap bass, "gritty" sub-bass, orchestral and electronic-sounded chorus, and "dark" trap metal-like melody. As in previous songs, Ayase, a member of Yoasobi, solely wrote and produced the song. According to him, the production of "Idol" was inspired by strong lows by American musician Ghostemane and bass guitar played during the live performance of Indonesia rapper Rich Brian at the 2022 Head in the Clouds Festival. "Idol" features uncredited background cheering shouts by Akihabara-based B-boy group and YouTuber Real Akiba Boyz, and gospel-styled background vocals sung in English for praise idol.

The Japan Times's Patrick St. Michel described the song as "a mix of varied influences that draws from Akihabara livehouses and Atlanta hip-hop," that is "connected by a piano dash that has come to define Ayase's production." JX Soo of NME said the song "conjur[ing] up the technicolor pop" like Kyary Pamyu Pamyu and Yellow Magic Orchestra. Writing for Shūkan Bunshun, music critic Hwang Sun-up noted that "Idol" "reflects a lot of K-pop elements" in terms of sound and composition, citing Blackpink's "How You Like That" for grand intro, and Nmixx's "O.O" for mixed structure. Ikura's vocals in the song are described as alternating between "cutest idol in the world"-like "sweet and clear" voice and "frenzy" and "introspection" with "deep sarcastic" snarls and "K-pop-esque" "rapid-fire" trap beat-styled rapping.

== Lyrics and interpretations ==
["Idol"] only depicts the story up to the end of [Oshi no Ko's] first episode. I thought that if the opening theme song was always one about what Ai was thinking when she was alive, what happened to her, and her love for Aqua and Ruby, that people would never forget about Ai, and she would become a legend.

— Ayase on the lyrics of "Idol", Billboard Japan

Told only until the end of Oshi no Ko's first episode, the lyrics of "Idol" express the two-faced nature of people in the entertainment industry, specifically Japanese idols, including idol's perfection and ultimate, and their fan's culture, psychology, and idolatry. The song shows the three perspectives on Ai Hoshino. The first part expresses the eyes of outsiders—fans and media—about her perfection. In the intro, she silences the media with her "invincible smile" and makes herself seem mysterious to fans, earning praise as a "perfect liar" and a "genius idol". The first verse shows Ai answering fans and her questions about not knowing how to love someone and no longer distinguishing between truths and lies. In the first chorus, the song speaks up about Ai's perfection and how she captivates everyone with her smile and saying "I love you" even though it is all a lie.

The second part sarcastically tells the story of the girl group B-Komachi's other members' jealousy of the "absolute" center, Ai, as they were relegated to her supporting roles as backup dancers. At the same time, the members cannot tolerate Ai's whining or her true feelings, and they want her always to be perfect and stronger than anyone else as an idol (also known as cult image). In the third and final part, the song depicts Ai's point of view on her reasons for lying, greed, and imperfection. She hides the secret that she is the mother of twin children, Ruby and Aquamarine. Metaphorized as Mary, mother of Jesus, she is convinced of her love's strength and believes the "singing and dancing" will hide the truth. Though outsiders view her as a perfect idol, Ai describes herself as a "greedy idol" and expresses her honesty and the magnitude of her desire for love. In conclusion, she hopes someday her lies become true and does not lie about loving her children.

=== 45510 ===
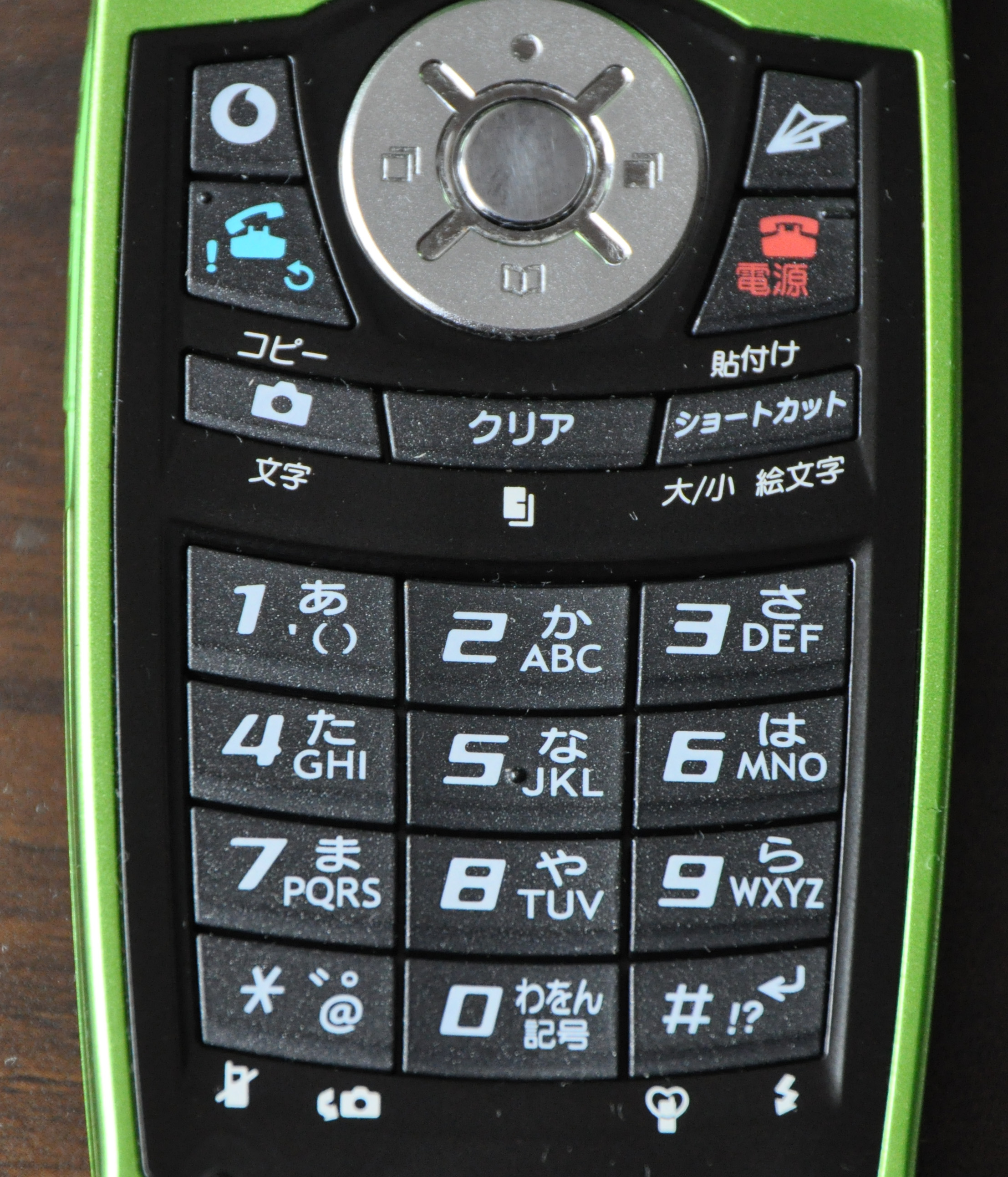
A mobile phone keypad with Latin and Japanese characters, which the latter refers to the title of 45510

The source of "Idol" is 45510, a short story written by Oshi no Ko's writer Aka Akasaka. The title refers to the initials of the manga's fictional idol girl group B-Komachi founding members: Takamine, Nino, Ai, and Watanabe, when typing on a telephone keypad. Each number corresponds when feeding kana inputs: "ta" (た) as "4", "ni" (に) as "55", "a" (あ) as "1", and "wa" (わ) as "0". The story was first published via Weekly Young Jump's website on April 13, shortly after the anime's first episode televised premiere, before being included as a poster booklet on the single physical releases.

The story is told from the perspective of an unidentified former founding member of B-Komachi, who discovers the livestream of their former groupmate and center, Ai Hoshino, 16 years after her death. The video shows Ai talking to her fans, prompting the former member to reminisce about her jealousy of Ai. After the video ended and she could not find more videos, the former member decided to log in to B-Komachi's blog, run by four founding members, using the password "45510". She found Ai's unpublished posts, written about her negative feelings and her desire to return to the past. The former member decided to delete the posts because she did not want to show Ai's weak side to everyone. Although she disliked Ai, the protagonist also respected Ai as a "perfect and ultimate idol".

== Critical reception ==
Upon its release, "Idol" received critical acclaim. Danny Guan from Game Rant praises "Idol" as a "perfect" representation of Ai Hoshino, and "jumping from brooding rap verses to energetic J-pop melodies with ease, flipping moods at the drop of a hat." Writing for Yahoo! News Japan, Suzie Suzuki compared the song as a parody of Kyoko Koizumi's 1985 single "Nantettatte Idol" and 2010s female idols, and commented, "It is too well done and has reached a metastructure of 'more idol song-like than a normal idol song.' " Real Sound's Mio Komachi dubbed the song "standing out" among Yoasobi discography, feeling "the essence of a Vocaloid song", and the "perfect" portrayal of Ai with an "almost inorganic" voice, while Tsuki no Hito described the song as "having this chaotic sense of balance incorporated K-pop homage [...], and exploded with a clear chorus that is typical of J-pop."

In a Rolling Stone Japan interview, Spotify Japan's Noriko Ashizawa said that "Idol" "has a composition in which the scene changes rapidly in a different sense from K-pop," and "the Vocaloid-like irregular melody progression is not similar to any overseas song." Rockin'On Japan's Miho Takahashi called the song "a perfect work that could not be better." Mikiki's S.H.I. dubbed "Idol" "a song representing 2023", stated about "emphasiz[ing] the impression of the performer's presence rather than the musicality." Patrick St. Michel of The Japan Times wrote that the song is "disorienting [...] but it's certainly catchy." Music critics Tássia Assis called the song "their magnum opus so far". Billboard Japan's chart director Seiji Isozaki and music journalist Tomonori Shiba lauded "Idol" as a representative song of the Reiwa era.

Nick Valdez from ComicBook.com praised the English version, "captured the spirit of the original version perfectly." Cinemas+'s Gumi commended the English version for retaining most of the message conveyed by the Japanese original lyrics. Writing for Screen Rant, Joshua Fox gave the English version a mixed review, commenting, "while still great to listen to, falls short of the Japanese version"; "the lyrics are largely exact translations with little to no alterations," so "the flow of the English version ends up feeling off in some parts." Fox compared the song to the complete English-language re-writing of Hikaru Utada's "Simple and Clean". Economist and entrepreneur Yūsuke Narita dubbed the Japanese and English versions as Matsuo Bashō's hokku "furu ike ya kawazu tobikomu mizu no oto" and its English translations in the 21st century. Music theorist Noriko Manabe analyzed the way in which the juxtaposition of several genres in "Idol" tells a story through the historical and cultural associations of these genres.

Critics' rankings of "Idol"
Critic/Publication	Accolade	Rank	Ref.
Anime News Network	The Best Songs of 2023	—N/a	
Bandwagon Asia	Top Songs of 2023	—N/a	
Destructoid	Top 10 Best Anime Openings (OPs) of All Time	5	
Genius	50 Best Songs of 2023	30	
IGN Brasil	The 7 Best Anime Openings of 2023	6	
The Nerd Stash	Top 10 Anime Openings of 2023	1	
Screen Rant	10 Best Anime Openings of 2023	1	
Suzie Suzuki	Best Ten of the Year (2023)	4	
Young Post	The Best Songs of 2023	—N/a	

== Commercial performance ==
=== Japan ===
"Idol" was an immediate commercial success in Japan. According to Oricon and Billboard Japan, the song became the fastest song to reach 100 million on-demand streams in Japan within five weeks, breaking the six weeks of Official Hige Dandism's "Subtitle" and BTS's "Butter". (Note: In 2025, Kenshi Yonezu's "Iris Out" surpassed "Idol" to became the fastest song to reach 100 million streams in Japan within four weeks.) It later broke a string of records for the fastest song to accumulate 200, 300, 400, 500, 600, 700, 800, 900 million, and one billion streams within 137 weeks. (Note: On Oricon, "Idol" took nine weeks for 200 million, 13 weeks for 300 million, 19 weeks for 400 million, 28 weeks for 500 million, 39 weeks for 600 million, 51 weeks for 700 million, 69 weeks for 800 million, 95 weeks for 900 million, and 137 weeks for one billion streams.) (Note: On Billboard Japan, "Idol" took nine weeks for 200 million, 14 weeks for 300 million, 21 weeks for 400 million, 30 weeks for 500 million, 41 weeks for 600 million, 54 weeks for 700 million, 72 weeks for 800 million streams, 100 weeks for 900 million streams, and 144 weeks for one billion streams.) (Note: In July 2026, Mrs. Green Apple's "Lilac" surpassed "Idol" to become the fastest song to reach one billion streams within 117 weeks.) The single became the first-ever song to reach one billion streams in Oricon history, and the second song on the Billboard Japan after the duo's own "Yoru ni Kakeru". As of April 2024, the Recording Industry Association of Japan (RIAJ) certified "Idol" double platinum for digital sales, exceeding 500,000 units; and diamond for streaming, surpassing 500 million times. The latter marked the song as the fastest song to achieve diamond certification in the RIAJ history within 295 days after the single release. The Japanese Society for Rights of Authors, Composers and Publishers (JASRAC) reported that "Idol" was the highest earned royalties in Japan for two consecutive years, from 2023 to 2024, and the sixth in 2025.

==== Oricon ====
For the issue dated April 24, 2023, "Idol" entered the Oricon Digital Singles Chart at number two, earning 33,867 digital sales, behind Man with a Mission and Milet's "Kizuna no Kiseki", and rose to the top the next week with 34,070 sales, making Yoasobi the most number-one song on the chart with 12 songs, tying with Kenshi Yonezu. (Note: Yonezu returned to the artist with the most number-one songs on the Oricon Digital Singles Chart again with 13 songs after "Tsuki o Miteita" debuting atop the chart.) It spent ten non-consecutive weeks atop the chart, the fifth song to reach it in history. (Note: Following Kenshi Yonezu's "Lemon" and "Uma to Shika", Lisa's "Homura", and Official Hige Dandism's "Subtitle") The song debuted atop the Streaming Chart with 10,328,178 on-demand streams, the duo's third number-one following "Yoru ni Kakeru" and "Kaibutsu", and topped the chart for 22 consecutive weeks, the second most weeks at number one, behind Official Hige Dandism's "Pretender" (34), (Note: Surpassed by the 23 consecutive weeks of Creepy Nuts' "Bling-Bang-Bang-Born" in 2024) and the fifth song to reach number one on the chart for more than ten weeks. (Note: Following Aimyon's "Marigold", and Official Hige Dandism's "Pretender", "I Love…" and "Subtitle") With 29,975,897 streams in the week of June 26, it became the duo's and 2023 biggest, and the second most accumulated streams in a single week in Oricon history, behide "Butter" (31 million streams), (Note: In 2025, Kenshi Yonezu's "Iris Out" surpassed "Idol" to become the second most accumulated streams in a single week in Oricon history with 32 million streams.) as well as the song with the most weeks exceeding 20 million streams (12), besting "Subtitle" (4). Moreover, "Idol" is the second song in 2023 since Be:First's "Boom Boom Back", and by the duo to reach number one on both the Oricon Digital Single and Streaming charts in the same week and topped for ten non-consecutive weeks, tying with "Subtitle".

"Idol" first opened at number five on the Oricon Combined Singles Chart dated April 24, and ascended to number one in the week of May 29, as the duo's second song since "Yoru ni Kakeru", after staying in the top five for five weeks. The song returned to number one in the week dated January 22, 2024, eight months after the first top. The CD single debuted at number two on the Oricon Singles Chart for the week of July 3, selling 49,385 copies, behind King & Prince's "Nanimono", while the English version peaked at number eight on the Digital Singles Chart with 6,080 units. "Idol" finished at number one on three Oricon 2023 year-end charts: Combined Singles, Digital Singles, and Streaming, earning 557,295 downloads and 570,368,238 streams.

==== Billboard Japan ====
"Idol" debuted at number one on the Billboard Japan Hot 100 for the week of April 19, 2023, scoring Yoasobi's second number-one song in the country since "Yoru ni Kakeru" in 2020. It earned 29,327 digital sales, 8,868,810 streams, and 4,334,923 video views in its first week. The song stayed at the number-one position for 21 consecutive weeks, beating "Subtitle" as the song with the most both consecutive and total weeks at number one in the chart history, which previously was eight consecutive weeks and 13 overall weeks, respectively. In the week of September 13, the song was finally unseated in the top position by Snow Man's "Dangerholic" and descended to number four. Four months later, the song re-peaked at number one in the week of January 17, 2024, expanding the longest number-one song record to 22 total weeks. "Idol" also topped the specific-genre Hot Animation, the third song following "Kaibutsu" and "Shukufuku", for 21 consecutive weeks, tying with Yonezu's "Kick Back"; and 37 total weeks, the second longest after 39 weeks of Lisa's "Gurenge". During that time, it was succeeded by King Gnu's "Specialz" for two weeks, and the duo's "Yūsha" for one week, and finally dethroned by Creepy Nuts' "Bling-Bang-Bang-Born" in the week of January 31, 2024.

For component charts, "Idol" opened at number two on the Download Songs, blocked from Man with a Mission and Milet's "Kizuna no Kiseki", and surged up to the top the next week with 30,505 downloads and spent ten non-consecutive weeks on the chart. On the Streaming Songs, the song debuted at number one, and topped for 24 non-consecutive weeks. It received 25,860,696 streams in the week of May 17, giving the song the second most streams overall in a single week at that time, behind BTS's "Butter" (30 million streams). (Note: In 2025, Kenshi Yonezu's "Iris Out" surpassed "Idol" to become the second most streams overall in a single week in Billboard Japan history with 28 million streams.) The "Idol" CD single sold 53,589 copies on its release week, landing at number two on the Top Singles Sales dated June 26, behind only King & Prince's "Nanimono". Following the 7-inch vinyl release, the single jumped from number 84 to 12 in the week of August 2 with 3,884 copies. Billboard Japan named "Idol" the best-performing song of 2023 on the Japan Hot 100. It became the most-streamed, most-downloaded, and most-heard-on-the-radio song in the country that fiscal year, receiving 527,143,965 streams, 148,838,759 video views, and 509,751 digital sales in 2023, which topped both the year-end Streaming Songs and Download Songs.

=== Worldwide ===
Music critic Motohiko Tokuriki compared the success of "Idol" to Fujii Kaze's "Shinunoga E-Wa", which was a hit overseas in 2022, and commented that it "has the potential to be a big step for the Japanese music industry in that it has clearly seen the world from the beginning and has been successful." Two weeks after its release, Yoasobi's distributor The Orchard reported that "Idol" had been streamed and viewed over 100 million times. The song first entered the Billboard Global Excl. US at number 135 for the issue dated April 22, 2023, within two days of tracking and then surged up 130 spots to number five the next week. Following the English version release and spent the first six of seven weeks in the top ten, the song rose atop the Global Excl. US—collecting 24,000 digital sales and 45.7 million streams in that week—becoming the first-ever Japanese-language song to top the chart, and stayed on it for three non-consecutive weeks. On the Billboard Global 200, "Idol" debuted at number 14 dated April 29, 2023, and peaked at number seven nine weeks later, setting a new record as the highest position by Japanese act on the chart at that time, surpassing Lisa's "Homura" (8). (Note: Kenshi Yonezu's "Iris Out" broke the "Idol" record in 2025 to become the highest peak on the Billboard Global 200 with number five.)

According to Luminate, as of June 2023, "Idol" had been streamed 722.71 million times worldwide in both audio and video platforms. In the inaugural week of September 14, 2023, the song debuted at number one on the Billboard Japan's newly launched Global Japan Songs Excl. Japan, which tracks the most streamed and digitally sold Japanese songs outside Japan in over 200 territories, and topped for 12 non-consecutive weeks. The song was the highest charted song at number 42 and 19 on the 2023 year-end Global 200 and Global Excl. US, respectively, the highest Japanese song in history. For music streaming services, the song reached number one on the global charts of both Apple Music and YouTube Music. On Apple Music, the song was the eighth most streamed song globally in 2023, the best-performing Japanese act, and the 291st most-listened-to song of all time, during 2015–2025. The International Federation of the Phonographic Industry (IFPI) reported that "Idol" was the nineteenth best-selling song in 2023, earning 1.01 billion subscription streams equivalents globally.

== Music video ==
A scene in "Idol" music video shows Ai Hoshino seeing their teen children Aqua and Ruby watching her on a television.

An accompanying music video for "Idol" premiered on Yoasobi's YouTube and Ayase's Niconico channels on April 13, 2023, at 0:30 JST, shortly after the televised premiere of Oshi no Ko. Directed by Naoya Nakayama and produced by Doga Kobo, who also was in charge of anime production, the visual features the same animated visuals as the anime, depicting the "bright and dark" symbolism of Ai Hoshino, and her twin children, Aqua and Ruby. In the end of video, it shows Aqua and Ruby as high school students watching her mother Ai performing on television, which does not appear in the anime. The director described the scene as "the world that Ai wanted to see".

The "Idol" music video became the duo's fourth music video to accrue 100 million views on YouTube, following "Yoru ni Kakeru", "Kaibutsu", and "Gunjō", as well as the fastest music video to reach this mark by any Japanese act within 35 days, surpassing the 62 days of NiziU's "Make You Happy". It became the 2023 most-viewed music-related video on YouTube in Japan. As of September 2026, the video has gained over 689 million views on YouTube, and 10 million views on Niconico, achieving "Legendary Status". The English version's music video was released later, alongside the song, on May 26, 2023.

== Live performances ==
Yoasobi debuted the performance of "Idol" on April 5, 2023, a week before the song's release, on their first show of Denkōsekka Arena Tour at Nippon Gaishi Hall, Nagoya, and included it on the tour's setlist as the only song of the encore. The duo also performed the song at the free TikTok special live concert at Theater Milano-za in Shinjuku, Tokyo on April 24 as the last song. Since then, "Idol" became a part of setlists for the duo's several music festivals and concert tours, including the 2023–2024 Asia tour, the Pop Out Zepp Tour (2024), the 2024 US tour, 2024 Coachella and Lollapalooza, the Chō-genjitsu Dome Live (2024), and Asia Tour (2024–2025), the Wandara Hall Tour (2025), etc.

The performance of "Idol" at the 2023 Summer Sonic Festival was recorded and broadcast via television special NHK Music Expo 2023 on September 14, 2023, while the Clockenflap festival via the 65th Japan Record Awards on December 30. In South Korea, Yoasobi gave the debut televised performance of the song at M Countdown on September 21, 2023, which has been rarely for Japanese artists to appear on South Korean music shows. In 2024, the duo performed "Idol" at the 8th Crunchyroll Anime Awards after they won Best Anime Song, the 16th Melon Music Awards, where they received J-pop Favorite Artist award and music show The Show, the latter two along with "New Me".

=== 74th NHK Kōhaku Uta Gassen ===
On November 13, 2023, NHK announced the lineup for the 2023 edition of New Year's Eve television special NHK Kōhaku Uta Gassen, held at NHK Hall, Shibuya, Tokyo on December 31, which Yoasobi would participate as a part of red team. It was the duo's third appearance on the television special after the attendances in 2020 and 2021 and the absence in 2022. A song to perform, "Idol", was revealed on five days before the show. Choreographed and staged by Ganmi's Sota Kawashima, "Idol" was presented as the 42nd show (excluding special performances), preceded by Fumiya Fujii's "True Love" and "Shiroi Kumo no Yō ni" with Hiroiki Ariyoshi, and succeeded by Masaharu Fukuyama's "Hello" and "Sōbō" medley.

Alongside the duo and the band members, the show featured numerous guests, beginning with dance troupe Avantgardey and B-boy group Real Akiba Boyz. Following the first verse, selected members from that year's ten participating Japanese and Korean idol groups—Seventeen (Hoshi, DK, Mingyu, and Seungkwan), Nogizaka46 (Minami Umezawa, Renka Iwamoto, Mizuki Yamashita, Haruka Kaki, Mayu Tamura, and Nao Yumiki), NiziU (Mako, Riku, Ayaka, Mayuka, and Miihi), Be:First (Sota, Leo, Junon, and Manato), NewJeans (Minji, Hanni, and Danielle), JO1 (Shosei Ohira, Syoya Kimata, Sukai Kinjo, Junki Kono, and Ruki Shiroiwa), Stray Kids (Felix, Seungmin, and I.N), Sakurazaka46 (Yui Kobayashi, Rina Matsuda, Yui Takemoto, Hikaru Morita, and Rena Moriya), Le Sserafim (Sakura, Kim Chaewon, Huh Yunjin, and Kazuha), and MiSaMo—performed one after another. Next, singer Ano and actress and the program's host Kanna Hashimoto—former member of idol groups You'll Melt More! and Rev. from DVL, respectively, who both gained attention from fan-taken photo comparisons of the two during their idol careers, nicknamed "the final battle between angel and devil"—appeared and did their viral posture. The show concluded by all performers performing together.

Despite the lowest rating (31.9% audience share) since 1989, the "Idol" show was considered to be the "highlight" and "the most attracted attention" of the event, especially online. The Japan News's Yohei Kitagawa praised the duo having a "strong and unrivaled" presence and "unifying force for all of the other stars on stage". However, the show had been criticized by some K-pop fans who argued that their favorite idols might have been degraded to "mere backup dancers". In contrast, others saw the performance as evidence for the international dominance of K-pop. The show recorded viewership rating of 34.2% in the Kantō region, the third highest following Misia's medley of "Ai o Arigatō", "Kizu-darake no Ōja", and "Ai no Katachi" and Pocket Biscuits and Black Biscuits' "Yellow Yellow Happy" and "Timing". The partial performance uploaded on NHK Music YouTube channel received 11.28 million views before it had been made private, the most among the channel's video.

== Cover versions and other uses ==
"Idol" has been covered by several other singers, musicians and idols, notably including singer and actress Airi Suzuki, who performed the song at TV Asahi YouTube program Dōga, Hajimete Mimashita on June 10, 2023, which accumulated ten million views as of September. Later, she included the song on the "Self-Cover Medley" of her performance at the 2023 Rock in Japan Festival in August. YouTuber Hikakin uploaded his parody music video for "Idol" on July 22, which replaced Ai Hoshino by himself. Dance company Avantgardey performed a routine to the song mashed up with the Japanese and English versions combined at the semi-final round of the 18th season of American talent show competition America's Got Talent.

Rie Takahashi, who voiced Ai for the anime, covered "Idol" on November 26 at Ichigo Production Fan Thanksgiving 2023, and uploaded her cover's music video on February 2, 2024. Retired figure skater Marin Honda, wearing as Ai, performed Oshi no Ko-themed ice skate show, featuring "Idol", at the BISF25 × The World of Anime on January 28, 2025, at Ovision Ice Arena, Fukuoka. Other notable covers included Yuya Tegoshi, Eunha of Viviz, Jorin of 4Eve, Tim Henson of Polyphia, Ayaka Hirahara and Avantgardey, Aya Shimazu, Toshi of X Japan, Junretsu, La Diva, and NiziU, Me:I, Fruits Zipper, Candy Tune, Sweet Steady and Cutie Street, etc.

In December 2024, "Idol" accompanied a projection mapping created by Yukihiro Oka for the Tokyo Night & Light project to display on the exterior of the Tokyo Metropolitan Government Building No. 1. The song appears in the racing game Forza Horizon 6 (2026), set in a fictionalized representation of Japan, as a track played on the fictional radio station Gacha City Radio.

== In popular culture ==
In late April 2023, Shortly after "Idol" release, a recreated video of the title sequence of Oshi no Ko connecting to the title sequence of Shin Getter Robo vs Neo Getter Robo, in which "Idol" was changed in the middle of the chorus to JAM Project's "Storm", "Kimi wa kanpeki de kyūkyoku no Gettā", (Note: Japanese: 君は完璧で究極のゲッター, lit. 'You are the perfect and ultimate Getter') went viral and became an Internet meme, which both Yoasobi and JAM Project former member Ichirou Mizuki's official Twitter accounts each responded the video. This meme resulted in "Storm" being officially released on music streaming services on July 3, 2023. The phrase "Kimi wa kanpeki de kyūkyoku no Gettā" won Gold Award at the 2023 Internet Buzzword Award, and Niconico Award and second place of Top 20 Words Award at the 2023 Internet Buzzwords 100.

Fan-made choreographies by Kotaro Ide and Ransensei, and the wotagei-styled dance of "Idol" also gained attention as a TikTok Internet challenge, covered by Japanese and Korean idols, among others. As of December 2023, the song garnered 7.9 billion views on TikTok. "Idol" was the most-searched and the third most-humed-to-search song on Google in 2023. The song was chosen as the best anime song of the Reiwa era by the survey from 10,000 people by TV Asahi television special 1 Man Nin ga Erabu! Tsui ni Kettei! Reiwa vs Heisei vs Shōwa Anison Ranking, and the second-most voted best anime song on the survey by 1,740 overseas anime fans from the TV Asahi television special Gaikokujin ga Gachi de Tōhyō! Sekai Anison Sōsenkyo, behind only Yoko Takahashi's "A Cruel Angel's Thesis".

== Accolades ==
At the 65th Japan Record Awards in 2023, despite the success of the song, "Idol" did not receive the Song of the Year award, which is a nomination for the main Grand Prize. Instead, Ayase won Best Composition Award for composing the song, and Yoasobi won the Special International Music Award. The gesture spawned several media and fans questioning how the nomination process for the Japan Record Awards works.

Awards and nominations for "Idol"
Ceremony	Year	Award	Result	Ref.
Abema Anime Trend Awards	2023	Anime Song Award	Won	
AnimaniA Awards	2024	Best Anime Song	Nominated	
Anime Grand Prix	2024	Best Theme Song	2nd place	
Anime Trending Awards	2024	Opening Theme Song of the Year	Won	
Crunchyroll Anime Awards	2024	Best Anime Song	Won	
Crunchyroll Anime Awards	2024	Best Opening Sequence	Nominated	
CX Award	2023	CX Award (Note: Awarded to Sony Music Entertainment Japan)	Won	
Japan Anime Record Awards	2023	Anime Song Award	Won	
Japan Expo Awards	2024	Daruma for Best Opening	Won	
Japan Gold Disc Award	2024	Song of the Year by Download (Japan)	Won	
Japan Gold Disc Award	2024	Best 3 Songs by Download	Won	
Japan Gold Disc Award	2024	Song of the Year by Streaming (Japan)	Won	
Japan Gold Disc Award	2024	Best 5 Songs by Streaming	Won	
Japan Record Awards	2023	Best Composition Award (Note: Awarded to Ayase)	Won	
JASRAC Awards	2024	Gold Prize	Won	
JASRAC Awards	2025	Gold Prize	Won	
Music Awards Japan	2025	Song of the Year	Nominated	
Music Awards Japan	2025	Top Global Hit from Japan	Won	
Music Awards Japan	2025	Best Japanese Song	Nominated	
Music Awards Japan	2025	Best Japanese Dance Pop Song	Nominated	
Music Awards Japan	2025	Best Anime Song	Won	
Music Awards Japan	2025	Best Music Video	Won	
Music Awards Japan	2025	Best Viral Song	Nominated	
Music Awards Japan	2025	Best Japanese Song in Asia	Nominated	
Music Awards Japan	2025	Best Japanese Song in Europe	Nominated	
Music Awards Japan	2025	Best Japanese Song in Latin America	Nominated	
Music Awards Japan	2025	Best of Listeners' Choice: Japanese Song	Nominated	
Music Awards Japan	2025	Song of the Year for Creators	Won	
MTV Video Music Awards Japan	2023	Video of the Year	Nominated	
MTV Video Music Awards Japan	2023	Best Animation Video	Won	
MTV Video Music Awards Japan	2023	Song of the Year	Won	
Newtype Anime Awards	2023	Best Theme Song	2nd place	
Reiwa Anisong Awards	2023	Best Work Award	Won	
Reiwa Anisong Awards	2023	Best Anime Song Award	Won	
Reiwa Anisong Awards	2023	User Voting Award	4th place	
TikTok Trend Awards	2023	Best Music	Won	
U-Can New Words and Buzzwords Awards	2023	New Words and Buzzwords Awards (Note: Nominated alongside Oshi no Ko)	Nominated	
Yahoo! Japan Search Awards	2023	Best Music	Won	

== Track listing ==
- Digital download and streaming
1. "Idol" (アイドル) – 3:33
- Digital download and streaming – English version
1. "Idol" (English version) – 3:33
- CD single and 7-inch vinyl
1. "Idol" – 3:31
2. "Idol" (English version) – 3:31
3. "Idol" (anime edit) – 1:29
4. "Idol" (instrumental) – 3:31
- 12-inch vinyl
1. "Idol" – 3:31
2. "Idol" (English version) – 3:31
3. "Idol" (anime edit) – 1:29
4. "Idol" (sped up and pitch up version) – 2:56
5. "Idol" (instrumental) – 3:31
6. "Tabun" – 4:16
7. "Tabun" (sped up and pitch up version) – 2:59
8. "Tabun" (instrumental) – 4:16

== Credits and personnel ==
- Ayase – writer, producer
- Ikura – vocals
- Aka Akasaka – based story writer
- Konnie Aoki – background chorus lyrics, English lyrics, English lyrical and vocal direction
- BFNK – English lyrical and vocal direction
- Real Akiba Boyz – background shouts
- Ebony Bowens – background chorus
- Chloe Kibble – background chorus
- Marista Stubbs – background chorus
- Imani J. Dawson – background chorus
- Kyte – background chorus
- Lyle Carr – background chorus
- Andrew Soda – background chorus
- Takayuki Saitō – vocal recording
- Kunio Nishikawara – vocal recording (English version)
- Hiroaki Okuda – background chorus and shouts recording
- Masahiko Fukui – mixing
- Hidekazu Sakai – mastering

== Charts ==
=== Weekly charts ===
Weekly chart performance for "Idol"
Chart (2023)	Peak position
Global 200 (Billboard)	7
Hong Kong (Billboard)	2
Japan (Oricon)	2
Japan Combined Singles (Oricon)	1
Japan Anime Singles (Oricon)	1
Japan Hot 100 (Billboard)	1
Japan Hot Animation (Billboard Japan)	1
Malaysia (Billboard)	19
New Zealand Hot Singles (RMNZ)	19
Singapore (RIAS)	10
South Korea (Circle)	68
Taiwan (Billboard)	2
US World Digital Song Sales (Billboard)	7
Vietnam Hot 100 (Billboard)	27

Weekly chart performance for "Idol" (English version)
Chart (2023)	Peak position
Japan Digital Singles (Oricon)	8

=== Monthly charts ===
Monthly chart performance for "Idol"
Chart (2023)	Position
Japan (Oricon)	9
Japan Anime Singles (Oricon)	2
South Korea (Circle)	69

=== Year-end charts ===
2023 year-end chart performance for "Idol"
Chart (2023)	Position
Global 200 (Billboard)	42
Global Singles (IFPI)	19
Japan (Oricon)	90
Japan Combined Singles (Oricon)	1
Japan Hot 100 (Billboard)	1
Japan Hot Animation (Billboard Japan)	1
South Korea (Circle)	158

2024 year-end chart performance for "Idol"
Chart (2024)	Position
Global 200 (Billboard)	186
Japan Combined Singles (Oricon)	8
Japan Hot 100 (Billboard)	4
Japan Hot Animation (Billboard Japan)	2

2025 year-end chart performance for "Idol"
Chart (2025)	Position
Japan Hot 100 (Billboard)	42
Japan Hot Animation (Billboard Japan)	13

== Certifications and sales ==
Certifications and sales for "Idol"
Region	Certification	Certified units/sales
Japan Physical	—	60,797
Japan (RIAJ) Digital	2× Platinum	500,000^{*}
Streaming
Japan (RIAJ)	Diamond	500,000,000^{†}
Summaries
Worldwide (IFPI)	—	1,010,000,000
^{*} Sales figures based on certification alone.^{†} Streaming-only figures based on certification alone.

== Release history ==
Release dates and formats for "Idol"
Region	Date	Format	Version	Label	Ref.
Various	April 12, 2023	Digital download; streaming	Original	Sony Japan	
Various	May 26, 2023	Digital download; streaming	English	Sony Japan	
Japan	June 21, 2023	CD single	Limited	Sony Japan	
Taiwan	June 30, 2023	CD single	Limited	Sony Taiwan	
Japan	July 26, 2023	7-inch vinyl	Limited	Sony Japan	
Taiwan	August 18, 2023	7-inch vinyl	Limited	Sony Taiwan	
Various	November 15, 2024	12-inch vinyl	Vinyl (+ "Tabun")	Milan	
Various	December 2024	12-inch vinyl	Vinyl (+ "Tabun")	Sony Japan; Black Screen	

== See also ==
- List of best-selling singles in Japan
- List of Billboard Global 200 number ones of 2023
- List of Billboard Global 200 top-ten singles in 2023
- List of Hot 100 number-one singles of 2023 (Japan)
- List of Hot 100 number-one singles of 2024 (Japan)
