= Yoasobi =

Japanese musical duo

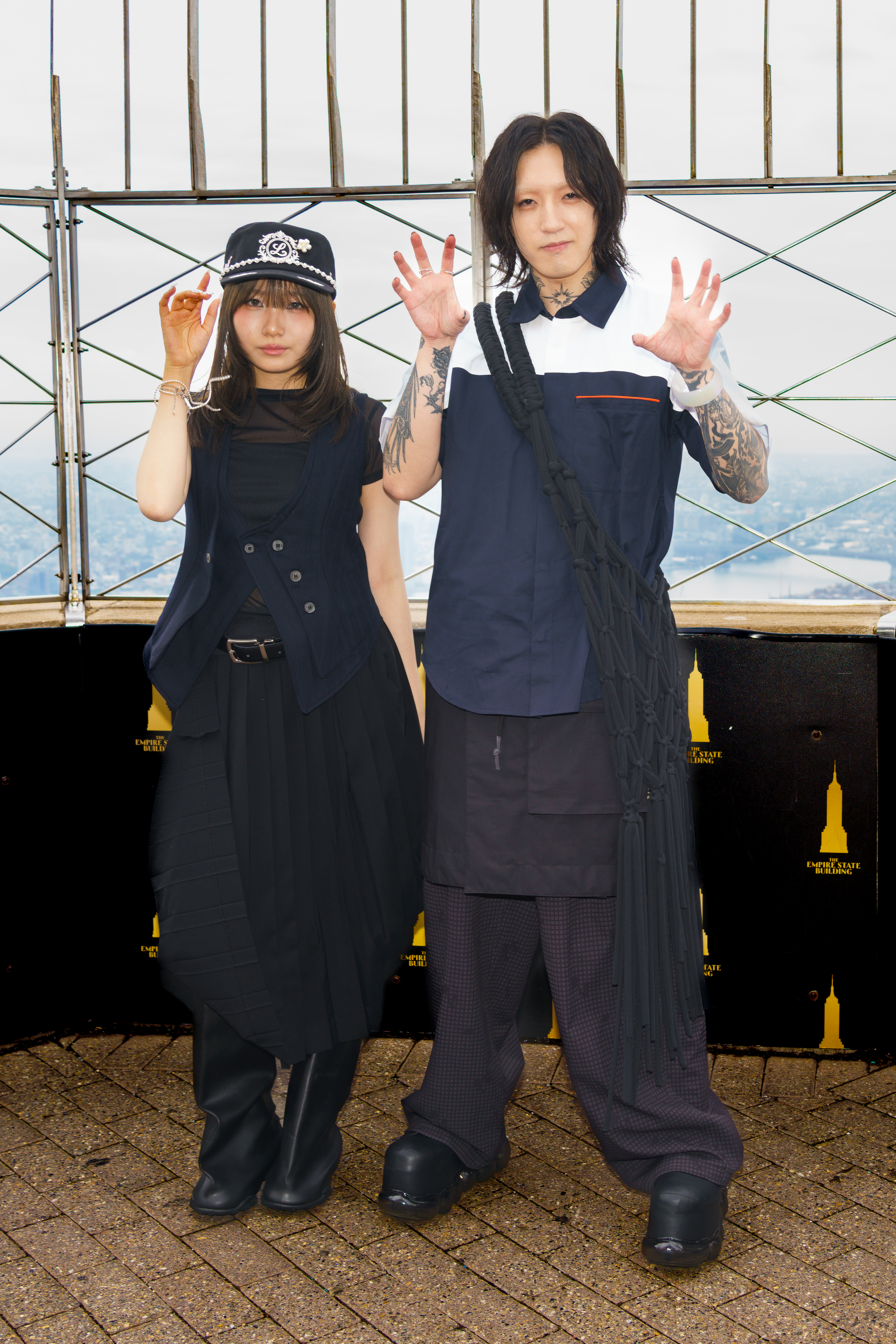
- Yoasobi in 2026; L-R: Ikura and Ayase

Background information
- Origin: Tokyo, Japan
- Genres: J-pop; electropop; electronic rock; pop rock; synth-pop
- Works: Discography; live performances
- Years active: 2019–present
- Labels: Sony Japan; Echoes
- Awards: Full list
- Members: Ayase; Ikura
- Website: yoasobi-music.jp

Yoasobi (Note: Japanese pronunciation: [joaꜜsobi]; stylized in all caps and officially spelled in Latin script in Japanese) is a Japanese musical duo formed in 2019. It consists of songwriter and producer Ayase and vocalist Ikura. Represented by the slogan "novel into music", the duo's narrative-driven songs are originally based on selected fictional stories posted on the website Monogatary.com. Later, sources also come from various media, such as fiction written by professional authors, books, letters, messages, plays, and social media posts. Known for its fast pace and complex structure, their music has been characterized as a blend of J-pop and Vocaloid music.

Rising to prominence during 2020 in Japan, Yoasobi's debut single, "Yoru ni Kakeru", topped the Billboard Japan Hot 100 for six non-consecutive weeks and its 2020 year-end chart, the first ever non-CD single to do so, as well as receiving the first ever diamond and double diamond certifications for streaming figures from the Recording Industry Association of Japan (RIAJ). Three other songs were also certified diamond: Blue Period-inspired "Gunjō" and anime series openers "Kaibutsu" from Beastars and "Idol" from Oshi no Ko. The latter set the record for the longest-running number one on the Japan Hot 100 history with 22 non-consecutive weeks, the first Japanese act to top the Billboard Global Excl. US, and was one of the best-selling songs worldwide in 2023. Several publications dubbed the duo a representative of J-pop of the 2020s and the Reiwa era.

Yoasobi's first four EPs—The Book, The Book 2 (2021), The Book 3 (2023), and The Book For, (2026)—explore the "reading CD" theme and peaked in the top ten on the Oricon Albums Chart. The duo entered the English-language market by translating their songs into English and releasing the E-Side EP series. Furthermore, the duo also collaborated with four Naoki Prize winners in the short story collection Hajimete no and performed songs based on each story. Yoasobi has received many accolades, including CD Shop Awards, Japan Gold Disc Awards, Japan Record Awards, MTV Video Music Awards Japan, Music Awards Japan, and Space Shower Music Awards.

== Name ==
The duo's name, Yoasobi, originates from the Japanese word yoasobi (夜遊び), literally meaning "nightlife". Ayase, who came up with the name, explained that it expresses his wish for him and Ikura to take on various playful challenges, comparing their individual careers to daytime and Yoasobi's to nighttime. The duo represents themselves by the slogan "novel into music" (Japanese: 小説を音楽にするユニット, Hepburn: shōsetsu o ongaku ni suru yunitto; lit. 'the band that turns novels into music'). When the song is not based on a fictional story, the duo will credit separately, as Ayase and Lilas Ikuta. The official fanclub is Yoa's (pronounced yours), which officially changed from Club Yoasobi (Club 夜遊) in October 2025.

== History ==
=== 2019–2021: Formation, "Yoru ni Kakeru", and The Book ===
Both members of Yoasobi had active music careers before the formation. Ayase was active as a vocalist for the rock band Davinci from 2012 to 2018; the band disbanded in 2020. He began producing music by using Vocaloid software Hatsune Miku during his hospital treatment for peptic ulcer disease. He uploaded his first song, "Sentensei Assault Girl", on Niconico in 2018 and gained popularity with "Last Resort" a year later. He released his debut EP, Ghost City Tokyo, in December 2019. Lilas Ikuta, who adopted the stage name Ikura for Yoasobi, started performing guitar on the streets and small venues at the age of 14, and uploading her music and covers via YouTube. In 2016, she participated in Sony Music Entertainment Japan's artist training course, the Lesson, and created her demo, 15 no Omoi. Later, Ikuta joined the cover group Plusonica until 2021, and issued her first two EPs: Rerise (2018) and Jukebox (2019) via independent label After School.

Yoasobi's first key visual (2019–2026)

In 2019, Yohei Yashiro, a founder of Monogatary.com, a social media platform for creative writing owned by SMEJ, presented the idea of a project to produce songs inspired by selected story submissions published on the website as a prize to authors instead of a book or anime adaptation, though not all were successful. Yashiro enlisted SMEJ's A&R Shuya Yamamoto to the project after they met at a party and shared the idea to him. In the mid-year, Ayase received an offer from Yashiro and Yamamoto to produce songs for the project. During the vocalist discussion, he discovered Ikura covering Aimyon's "Kimi wa Rock o Kikanai" on Instagram. He contacted her directly to recruit her to form a duo. Yoasobi announced their debut via a teaser video on October 1, 2019. Planned to be a trial-run project, the duo first produced two songs based on the Sony Music Award winners at Monogatary.com's novel contest, Monocon 2019. They consist of "Yoru ni Kakeru" from Mayo Hoshino's short story Thanatos no Yūwaku and "Ano Yume o Nazotte" from Sōta Ishiki's Yume no Shizuku to Hoshi no Hana.

A music video for "Yoru ni Kakeru" was uploaded on November 16, 2019, and accrued one million views on YouTube within a month. The song was subsequently released to digital music and streaming platforms the next month, on December 15, independently from SMEJ's labels and distributed by the Orchard. During the beginning of the COVID-19 pandemic in early 2020, "Yoru ni Kakeru" went viral on social media, topping the Spotify's Viral Top 50 chart in January. Its The Home Take live performance by Ikura also boosted the song's popularity. Six months after its release, the song ascended to number one on the Oricon Combined Singles Chart, and the Billboard Japan Hot 100. It spent a total of six weeks atop the latter chart, of which three weeks were consecutive. Eventually, "Yoru ni Kakeru" finished 2020 as the year's number-one Japan Hot 100 song, making it the first-ever year-end chart topper with no physical release. The song won the Song of the Year at the 2020 MTV Video Music Awards Japan and the 2021 Space Shower Music Awards, and the Silver Prize at the 2023 JASRAC Awards.

Following their debut single, Yoasobi released "Ano Yume o Nazotte" on January 18, 2020. Four months later, "Halzion" was released on May 11 as part of Suntory's Immersive Song Project to advertise energy drink Zone. Sourced from Shunki Hashizume's Soredemo, Happy End, it was the duo's first collaboration with a professional novelist, whereas the first two were amateur writers. In the second half of the year, they continually released three more singles. "Tabun" was released on July 20 and was based on the short story of the same name by Shinano, which won the Yoasobi Contest Vol. 1. Used on Bourbon's Alfort Mini Chocolate commercial, "Gunjō", featuring uncredited chorus from Plusonica, was released on September 1. The song was sourced from the short story written by the brand's creative team Ao o Mikata ni, inspired by the manga series Blue Period. On December 18, the duo released the single "Haruka", a collaboration with screenwriter Osamu Suzuki for its based short story Tsuki Ōji.

On December 31, Yoasobi concluded 2020 at the year-end television special 71st NHK Kōhaku Uta Gassen with the debut live performance of "Yoru ni Kakeru" as a duo, along with the band members, filmed at Bookshelf Theater, Kadokawa Culture Museum in Tokorozawa. It made the duo the first-ever artist to perform at the TV special without any physical releases. All previously released singles were featured on the duo's debut EP The Book, released on January 6, 2021, expressing a theme of "reading CD" with binder package. It additionally included "Encore", based on Yoasobi Contest Vol. 1-winning Sekai no Owari to, Sayonara no Uta by Kanami Minakami and featured on Google Pixel 5 and Pixel 4a (5G) advertisement. The EP debuted at number two on the Oricon Albums Chart and the Billboard Japan Hot Albums. As of 2021, The Book has sold 150,000 CD and 100,000 digital sales, the latter making it the only album to reach the milestone that year, and was certified gold for the both by the RIAJ. The EP won Special Award at the CD Shop Awards.

=== 2021: The Book 2 ===
First announced in late 2020, Yoasobi recorded both the opening and ending themes for the second season of the Japanese anime series Beastars. Its opening theme, "Kaibutsu", was released on January 6, 2021, while its ending theme, "Yasashii Suisei", came on the 20th. Both songs were based on short stories written by the anime's writer Paru Itagaki—Jibun no Mune ni Jibun no Mimi o Oshi Atete and Shishiza Ryūseigun no Mama ni, respectively. The double A-side CD single of both tracks reached number two on the Oricon Singles Chart, and made "Kaibutsu" peaking at number two on the Japan Hot 100. "Kaibutsu" won four awards for Song of the Year (Japan) in both download and streaming categories at the 36th Japan Gold Disc Award, and ranked number five in Time's 10 Best Songs of 2021, the only Japanese act to appear on the list. In support of The Book, the duo held their first livestream concert, Keep Out Theater, on February 14 at the construction site of former Shinjuku Milano-za (today Tokyu Kabukicho Tower) for 40,000 online audiences. The duo hosted their Tuesday slot of radio program All Night Nippon X from March 2021 to March 2022.

Yoasobi's song "Mō Sukoshi Dake", based on the Yoasobi Contest Vol.3 with Mezamashi TV-winning story Meguru by Chiharu, served as the 2021 theme for the morning show Mezamashi TV since April and was released on May 10. The duo's "Sangenshoku" was released on July 2, using as jingle for NTT Docomo's mobile network operator Ahamo commercial since February, based on scriptwriter Yūichirō Komikado's RGB. On August 9, they released "Loveletter", sourced from Hatsune's letter, "Ongaku-san e", which won Japan Post Service-owned radio show Sunday's Post's Letter Song Project. From September 9 to 13, the duo and Sony Park Exhibition held an exhibition, Semiconductors Create New Realities, at Ginza Sony Park, where their song "Taishō Roman" accompanied the event. The song was adapted from Natsumi's short story Taishō Romance, a winner of Yoasobi Contest Vol.2, and was released two days after the exhibition ended. The duo was in charge of a theme for Sustainable Development Goals (SDGs) children's television shows Hirogare! Irotoridori, "Tsubame", featuring vocal group Midories. The song was released on October 25, and based on Nana Ototsuki's short story Chiisana Tsubame no Ōkina Yume. In the same month, they appeared on YouTube Music's Artist Spotlight Stories.

Yoasobi released their second EP, The Book 2, on December 1, 2021. Alongside their all singles released that year, it included "Moshi mo Inochi ga Egaketara", a theme for and based on the 2021 play of the same name written and directed by Osamu Suzuki, performed in August and September 2021. The EP debuted at number two on the Oricon Albums Chart, and topped the Billboard Japan Hot Albums for the first time. It won Special Award at the CD Shop Awards. In support of The Book 2, Yoasobi held their first face-to-face one-off concert, Nice to Meet You, at Nippon Budokan on December 4 and 5, receiving 14,000 offline attendees, and starred on an episode of documentary program Jōnetsu Tairiku on December 12. The duo participated in the 72nd NHK Kōhaku Uta Gassen on December 31, where they performed "Gunjō" for the main show, featuring a symphony orchestra, and "Tsubame" as part of "Colorful Special Segment" with Midories and mascots from Hirogare! Irotoridori.

Furthermore, in 2021, Yoasobi began exploring the English-language market by translating the original Japanese song into English, as suggested by the Orchard. The first single, "Into the Night", translated from "Yoru ni Kakeru", was released on July 2. Afterwards, the duo released three more singles: "RGB" ("Sangenshoku"), "Monster" ("Kaibutsu") in July, and "Blue" ("Gunjō") in October. All singles featured on their debut English-language EP E-Side, released digitally on November 12. Commercially, the EP peaked at number 19 on the Oricon Combined Albums Chart, and number nine on the Billboard Japan Hot Albums. Yoasobi won Artist of the Year at the 2021 MTV Video Music Awards Japan and the 2022 Space Shower Music Awards, as well as the Special Achievement Award at the 63rd Japan Record Awards.

=== 2022–2023: Hajimete no, "Idol" and The Book 3 ===
Yoasobi collaborated with four Naoki Prize winners—Rio Shimamoto, Mizuki Tsujimura, Miyuki Miyabe, and Eto Mori—to perform songs based on their short stories under the theme of "a story to read when you do [something] for the first time". All stories contain Shimamoto's Watashi Dake no Shoyūsha, Tsujimura's Yūrei, Miyabe's Iro Chigai no Trump, and Mori's Hikari no Tane. The short story collection was published as Hajimete no by Suirinsha on February 16, 2022. The first single of the project based on Shimamoto's story, "Mr.", was released in conjunction with the book publication. It was followed by Mori's story-based "Suki da" on May 30, Tsujimura's story-based "Umi no Manimani" on November 18, and Miyabe's story-based "Seventeen" on March 27 the next year. All songs were collected on the book's companion EP, issued on May 10, 2023. It peaked at number nine on the Oricon Singles Chart.

Yoasobi participated in an outdoor music festival for the first time in August 2022, starting at the Rock in Japan Festival. The duo performed the first opening theme of the mecha anime series Mobile Suit Gundam: The Witch from Mercury, "Shukufuku", based on the short story Yurikago no Hoshi by the anime's writer Ichirō Ōkouchi. The song was released on October 1 and peaked at number two on the Japan Hot 100. They released their second English-language EP E-Side 2 on November 18. The EP debuted at number ten on the Billboard Japan Hot Albums. Yoasobi performed overseas for the first time in December 2022 at the Head in the Clouds Festival in Indonesia. The duo collaborated with Universal Studios Japan's student support campaign Unibaru for a theme song based on the story that won the campaign's contest under the theme "unforgettable memories in school age at the [USJ] park". The winning story was Lens Goshi no Kirameki o by Nagi, resulted in the song "Adventure", released on February 15, 2023.

In 2023, Yoasobi was in charge of the opening theme of the anime series Oshi no Ko, titled "Idol". It was based on manga artist Aka Akasaka's short story 45510, and released on April 12. The song was a massive success, topped both the Oricon Combined Singles Chart and Billboard Japan Hot 100. Stayed for 22 non-consecutive weeks, it became the longest running number-one song in the Japan Hot 100 history. Globally, "Idol" peaked at number seven on the Billboard Global 200, and topped the Global Excl. US, the first-ever Japanese-language song to do so. Its music video also set a record as the fastest by a Japanese act to reach 100 million views on YouTube in 35 days. The song won various industrial awards, including Best Animation Video and Song of the Year at the 2023 MTV Video Music Awards Japan, Best Anime Song at the 8th Crunchyroll Anime Awards, Song of the Year in both download and streaming categories at the 38th Japan Gold Disc Award, Gold Prize at the 2024 and 2025 JASRAC Awards. and four awards at the 2025 Music Awards Japan, including the main Top Global Hit from Japan. "Idol" became the 2023 best-performing song in Japan, while the International Federation of the Phonographic Industry (IFPI) ranked the song as the 19th best-selling song in 2023 globally.

The duo embarked on their first concert tour in 2023, Denkōsekka Arena Tour, in seven cities with fourteen shows throughout Japan, commenced in Nagoya on April 5 and concluded in Yokohama on June 24, which amassed 130,000 attendees. During the tour, they held a livestream concert through TikTok on April 24 at Theater Milano-za, the same venue as the Keep Out Theater when it was under construction. The duo had their first performance in the Western Hemisphere at the Head in the Clouds Festival in the United States in August. Yoasobi released their third EP, The Book 3, on October 4, comprising all singles from 2022 to the September 2023, which included the first opening theme for the anime series Frieren: Beyond Journey's End, titled "Yūsha", based on Jirō Kiso's short story Fanfare for Frieren with supervision by the manga's writer Kanehito Yamada. The song was released ahead on the EP on September 27 and peaked at number two on the Japan Hot 100. The Book 3 debuted at number two on both the Oricon Albums Chart and Billboard Japan Hot Albums.

=== 2023–2025: Overseas expansion and fifth anniversary ===
In November 2023, Yoasobi was the opening act for the two Tokyo shows of Coldplay's Music of the Spheres World Tour, and released the single "Biri-Biri", inspired by the short story written by Ayano Takeda Kimi to Ameagari o, to commemorate the first anniversary of the release of the role-playing video games Pokémon Scarlet and Violet. The next month, the duo were featured on Yumi Matsutoya's 50th anniversary greatest hit album Yuming Kanpai!!, for the remake of "Chūō Freeway", originally from 14 Banme no Tsuki (1976), adding new materials sourced from Matsutoya's biographical novel Subete no Koto wa Message Shōsetsu Yuming (2022) by Mariko Yamauchi. They also participated in the seventh iteration of television special 18Fes, performed one-time-only "Heart Beat" with 1,000 teenagers between 17 and 20 years old, broadcast on December 25 and the song was released the next day.

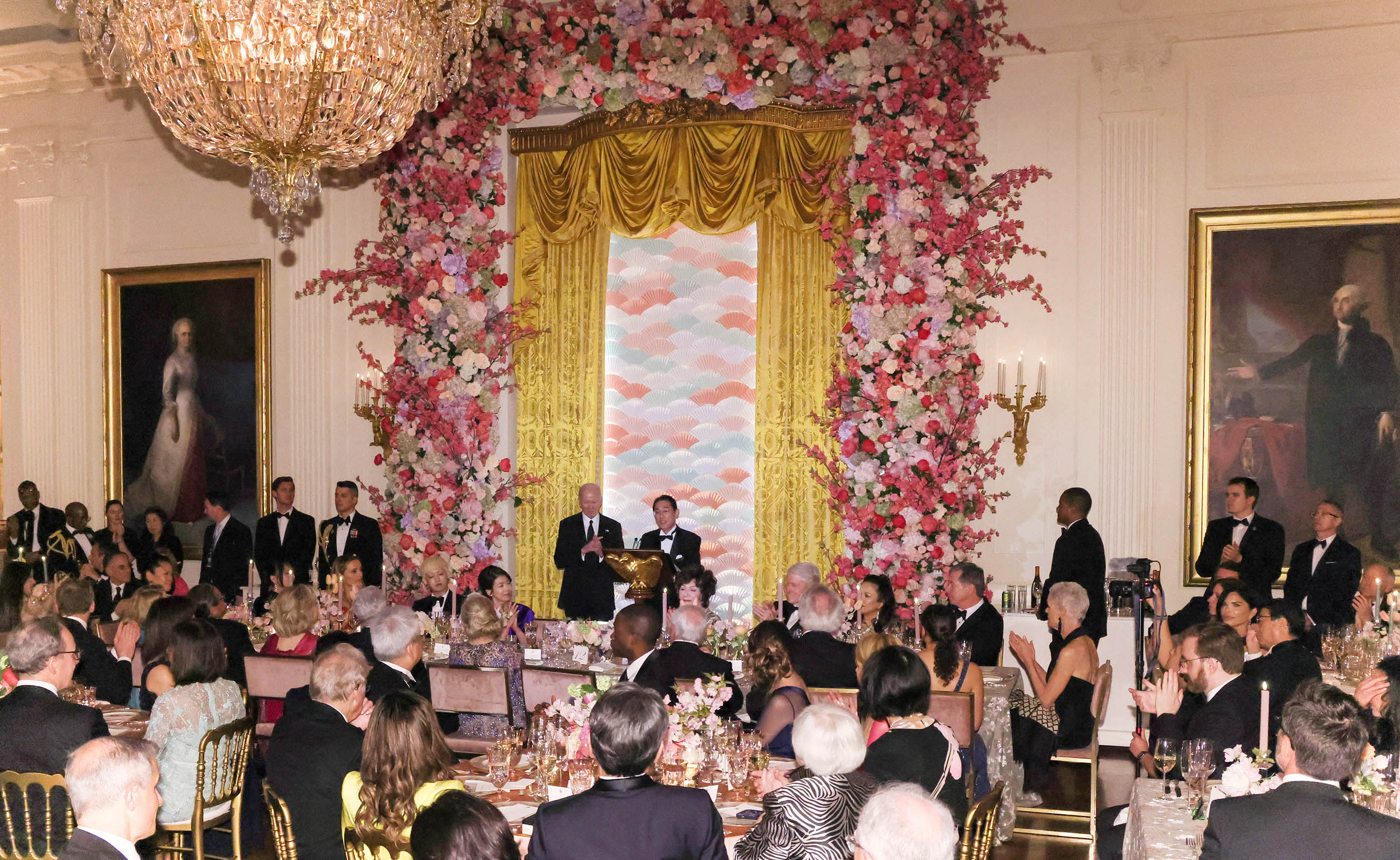
Yoasobi (sitting left of where Joe Biden and Fumio Kishida stand) during a state dinner at the East Room, White House

On December 31, 2023, Yoasobi performed "Idol" at the 74th NHK Kōhaku Uta Gassen, joined by selected members of Japanese and Korean idol groups from Seventeen, Nogizaka46, NiziU, Be:First, NewJeans, JO1, Stray Kids, Sakurazaka46, Le Sserafim, and MiSaMo, actress Kanna Hashimoto, singer Ano, dance troupe Avantgardey, and b-boy group Real Akiba Boyz. The duo embarked on their first Asia tour from December 2023 to January 2024, and continued with the Pop Out Zepp Tour in Japan between January and March 2024, The duo released their third English-language EP E-Side 3 on April 12. In the same month, they were invited to the US President Joe Biden-hosted state dinner for Japanese Prime Minister Fumio Kishida at the White House, and signed an agent contract with Creative Artists Agency. In April and August, they finished two US major music festivals and a concert tour: Coachella, Lollapalooza, and the Yoasobi Live in the USA. They made a guest appearance on NewJeans' Bunnies Camp 2024 Tokyo Dome on June 26.

Yoasobi performed a theme for original net animation Monogatari Series: Off & Monster Season, titled "Undead". It was released on July 1, 2024, and sourced from two short stories, Nadeko Past and Shinobu Future, written by Monogatari writer Nisio Isin. The song reached number ten on the Japan Hot 100. In the same month, on July 25, the duo released "Butai ni Tatte", a theme for NHK's 2024 coverage of sports events, including the Summer Olympics and Paralympics. It was based on short story adaptations written by Jun Esaka of three one-shot manga: Taizan 5's Hanareta Futari, Yūki Kirishima's Parallel Lane, and Hirusagari Haruno's Owaranai Deuce. On September 12, it was announced that Yoasobi had moved to SMEJ's newly established talent agency and record label, Echoes. The duo recorded a theme song for the 2024 animated film Fureru, titled "Monotone", issued on October 1. The film's writer Mari Okada wrote a short story for the song Fureru. no, Zen'ya.

To commemorate their fifth anniversary, Yoasobi collaborated with magazine Vi/Nyl to hold an exhibition titled Yoasobi Keep Out Gallery from October 5 to 14 at Ginza Sony Park, and publish Vi/Nyl Super Yoasobi 5th Anniversary Book on October 30. The duo also embarked on their Chō-genjitsu Dome Live from October to November, received 170,000 audiences. The tour's concert film was released to theaters on February 21, 2025, and its live album came out on November 4, 2026. At the tour, they debuted "New Me" and released it on November 11. The song was sourced from Mado Arite's short story Hakusan-dōri Enjō no Ken, winning Bungei × Monogatary.com Collaboration Award at the Monocon 2023, and used as a jingle for Recruit's second part of Mada, Koko ni Nai, Deai, Koko ni Nai, Ongaku project commercial, "Wakaranai mama, Sore de mo". Yoasobi ran their second Asia tour of the same name as the dome tour from December 2024 to February the next year, attracting 140,000 people.

=== 2025–present: The Book For, ===
Released on March 21, 2025, "Players" is a collaboration between Yoasobi and PlayStation for the Project: Memory Card based on "a game you want to erase your memory of and play again" collected from X users via hashtag #MemoryOfPlay to commemorate the 30th anniversary of the home video game console's first release. On May 17, the duo released "Watch Me!", the first opening theme for the anime series Witch Watch, sourced from Kenta Shinohara's short story Kokoro Kororon. They travelled in Europe to participate at Primavera Sound in Barcelona, Spain, and held a one-off concert at Wembley Arena, London, England in June, and returned to Japan to embark on their Wandara Hall Tour between July and November, focusing on small cities rather than the big ones, and open for the Saitama show of Billie Eilish's Hit Me Hard and Soft: The Tour.

Yoasobi and South Korean girl group Le Sserafim collaborated on the song "The Noise" to celebrate the 20th anniversary of fashion e-commerce website Zozotown. It contains a sample of the duo's "Yoru ni Kakeru", and was released on September 26. On October 2, their first television drama series theme, "Gekijō", for Pray Speak What Has Happened, was issued. Based on the series writer Kōki Mitani's Gekijō Monogatari, it is the duo's first song that provides the vocals from Ayase, and its live-action music video features the members, their band members, and actors Masaki Suda and Fumi Nikaido. In November, the duo covered Radwimps' "Kaishin no Ichigeki" (2013), which featured on the band's tribute album Dear Jubilee: Radwimps Tribute, and was selected as one of the openers on the band's 20th anniversary tour.

In January 2026, Yoasobi updated their key visual, and released "Adrena" and "Baby", opening and ending themes for the anime adaptation of the manga series Hana-Kimi (2026), sourced from Fuyu Tsuyama's short story, Magical and Yasuko Aoki's My Dear......, respectively. The duo hosted an exhibition in collaboration with Sony PCL, Into the World, from March 11 to 15 at Sony headquarters. Yoasobi released their fourth English-language EP, E-Side 4, on April 24, and their fourth Japanese-language EP, The Book For, on June 26, serving as the final installment of The Book series. The latter EP included the collaboration with Overwatch, "Orion", based on E. C. Myers's short story The Fall of a Sparrow, and peaked at number seven on the Oricon Albums Chart and the Billboard Japan Hot Albums. In the second half of 2026, the duo ran their Never Ending Stories Tour in North America in July and August, including the Osheaga debut, and embarked on the Super Planet Tour in Japan, Asia, and Australia from October 2026 to April 2027.

Yoasobi recorded a theme for the 115th asadora, Blossom (2026), "Sakihokore". Based on Risa Wataya's Hana no Inochi wa Fumetsu nari, it was released on October 14. The sequel project of Hajimete no, Hajimete no Bungei-bu, which was previously announced in September 2022, comprises Kozumu Ayane's Kono Roku de mo Nai Yatsu Shika Inai Sekai de, Rei Hachikawa's Restart, Naruse Hazuki's Shiawase no Katachi, and Yoa Mabyō's Senpai o Koroshitai no de Josō Suru. The latter was published in October 2026 and was adapted into the song "Killa", released on November 11. Co-arranged by Tsumiki, it is the first time that the duo has an outside musician involved the song.

== Artistry ==
=== Influences ===
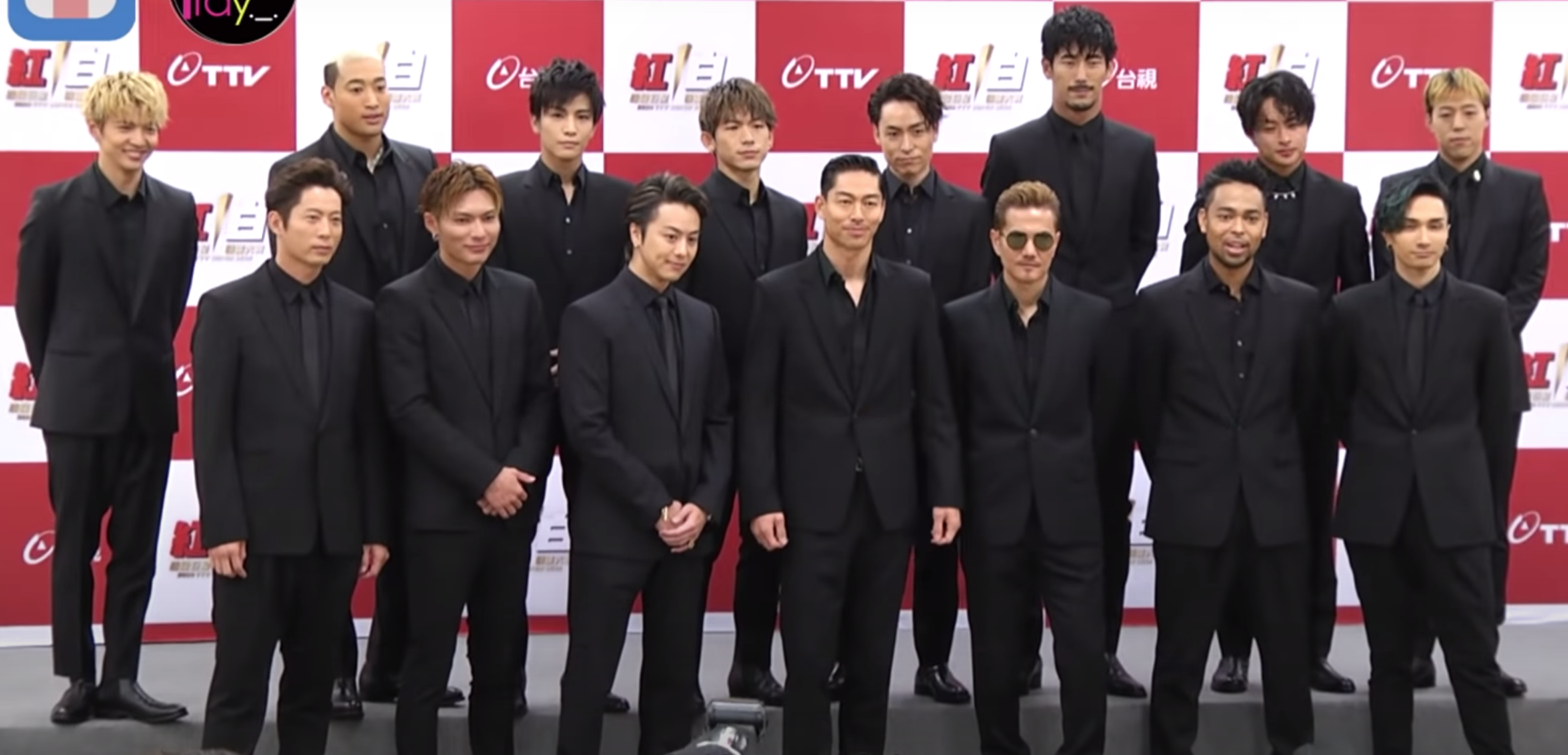
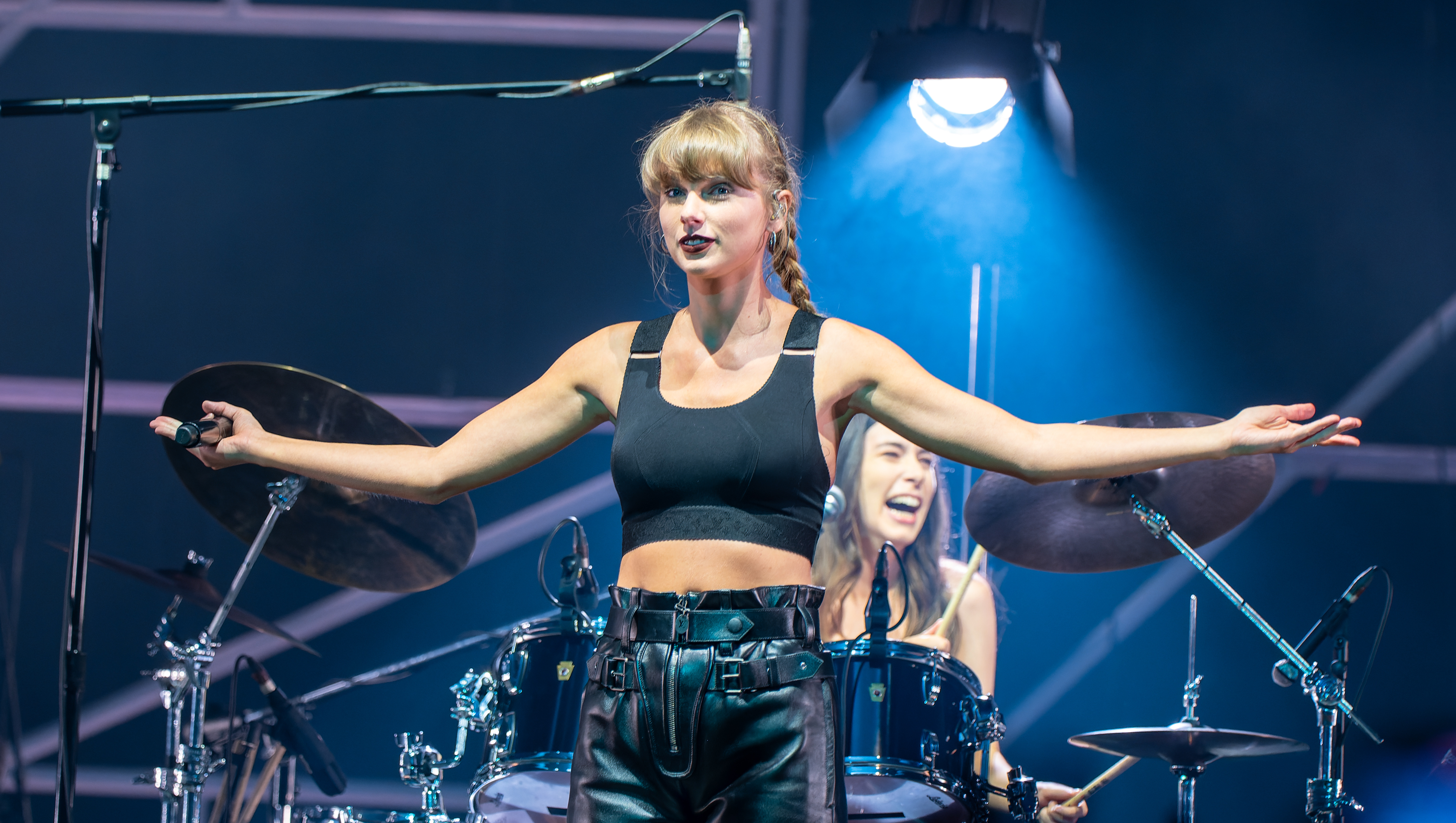
Exile (top) and Taylor Swift (bottom) are Ayase's and Ikura's respective major musical influences.

In their childhood, Ayase was influenced by '80s and '90s music, K-pop, J-pop, and folk music, while Ikura enjoyed Western music such as songs from Disney, folk, and country music, as well as Japanese R&B and hip-hop. Ayase named the boy band Exile as an inspiration to pursue a musical career. He also mentioned various rock bands as his musical influences, such as Sukima Switch, Kobukuro, Radwimps, Maximum the Hormone, Coldrain, Crossfaith, SiM, Slipknot, and Bring Me the Horizon, as well as non-rock acts Aiko, Post Malone, Yumi Matsutoya, Mariya Takeuchi, and Toshinobu Kubota. Ikura cites Taylor Swift as her major musical influences. The others include Arashi, Ikimonogakari, Radwimps, and Yui.

=== Musical styles ===
Yoasobi's musical style combines elements of pop, rock, and electronic, with Vocaloid root. More specifically, the duo's genre has been categorized as pop rock, synth-pop, electropop, and electronic rock; Billboard Japan noted that the latter genre is the current direction Yoasobi has taken, as they emphasize on live performances. In the Associated Press interview in September 2024, Ayase explained their transcending music genre: "We think that Yoasobi is its own genre. There's no specific genre they're going after we're going after. We're definitely influenced by J-pop in general." Yoasobi's music is often described as a "fast" and "relentless" pace and complex structures with shifting rhythms, key changes, and octave jumps, as well as "catchy melodies and memorable hooks". Billboard wrote that their music is an "unmistakable pop". The Asahi Shimbun reviewed Ikura's vocals on the duo' songs "effortlessly clear[ing] high notes and sails through rapid-fire lyrics in time with their tempos, even showing off some playful rap [...]." Per music theorist Noriko Manabe, the way that Yoasobi juxtaposes several genres in songs like "Idol" forms a narrative through the historical and cultural associations of these genres.

The duo, their music, and their visuals have been compared to other Japanese musical acts such as Yorushika and Zutomayo, which are also known for their Vocaloid roots and animated music videos. These three groups are collectively described by the meme, Internet culture, and neologistic genre called "Yakōsei" (夜好性; lit. 'night-loving scene'), as all of them have the word "夜" (read ya, yo, yoru, etc. depend on words), meaning "night" in their name, and express a "quiet nighttime" feeling, which surged in popularity during the COVID-19 pandemic. In an interview with Pen, music critic Tomonori Shiba called that the duo represents of the current generation of "male producer and female vocalist" band with "Mr. Children-like" creative process. Writing for Brutus, critic Suzie Suzuki dubbed the duo' music "a Reiwa-like appearance and a Shōwa-like inner self", citing frequent uses of F–G–Em–Am chord progression. Furthurmore, Yoasobi often titled their songs with "straightforward" word, e.g. "Gunjō", "Idol", and "Yūsha", as "the best words to describe the music, not the story itself."

=== Songwriting ===
Unlike traditional songwriting, Yoasobi's lyrics are narrative, mostly rooted in fictional stories submitted by general public on Monogatary.com, or written by professional novelist or manga artist, while some are non-fiction, such as letter for "Loveletter", messages, essays, and videos for "Heart Beat", social media posts for "Players", etc. Manga and anime itself do not being used as the song's source material. Ayase described the duo's music as "creating new stories and sharing them with everyone" rather than "making music" and "connection" between "meaning to melodies". Tomonori Shiba called the duo's genre a "story music". Writing for Paper, Crystal Bell told Yoasobi's narrative "is often pensive, even melancholic." Real Sound's Natsume Sogami described the duo's music as a "derivative work", which creates styles contrasting with other musicians and songwriters. Hiroaki Nagahata from Pen wrote that their songs "reflect modern motifs, including negative things that no one would dare say in public." Ikura's signature "ah" vocable also frequently appears on the duo's songs, both in lyrics and not. In their recent career, the duo has also put more choir into their songs.

Before working on a Yoasobi song, Ayase repeatedly reads the original story to understand its content and choose suitable sounds and melodies. He interprets and writes the songs that reflects on his feelings and experiences as they relate to the story by not including everything of the story. Ayase defines emotions and impressions of songs he created as color. Ikura sings the duo's songs from the perspective of the story's protagonist, storyteller, or narrator, not from herself. Described as "DIY", "hands-on", and "handmade"-styled production, Ayase uses minimal hardware and software for creating a demo—MacBook Pro, EarPods, Logic Pro and Splice—and rarely uses real musical instruments. He records vocals by using Vocaloid (mostly Hatsune Miku) before real vocals, allowing him to avoid any distortion based on a human vocalist's interpretation. After receiving the demo, Ikura writes her first impression of the lyrics and chooses the best way to sing them before recording. Music director and record producer Konnie Aoki usually translates Yoasobi's songs into English. His word choices maintain sound structure and the rhythm of the original Japanese lyrics.

== Endorsements and collaborations ==
Similar to other Japanese singers, Yoasobi's songs have been used in affiliation with various media, including anime series and films, advertisements, television shows, events, video games, etc. In June 2021, Uniqlo's T-shirt brand UT partnered with the duo to produce T-shirts with patterns inspired by their song's visuals. To promote the collaboration, they held the free livestream concert Sing Your World at Uniqlo City Tokyo, Ariake and streamed via the duo's official YouTube channel on July 4, received 280,000 online viewers globally. The collaboration returned in 2026 with T-shirts designed by Ai Nina, Gillochindox Gillochindae, Ryota Daimon, and Qingyi. In September 2021, the duo was chosen as a mascot for the 59th Sendenkaigi Awards.

The duo partnered with Book Truck in July 2022 to launch a pop-up bookstore and café, Tabi Suru Honya-san Yoasobi-gō, which first debuted at Curry & Music Japan 2022 that same month. For the event, the duo supervised special curries: Ayase's "White Yama Curry" and Ikura's "Angel's Chicken Curry". In June 2023, Acecook's Super Cup 1.5x partnered with the duo to produce two special flavors for instant noodles, which are Ikura's salted tonkotsu and Ayase's spicy soy sauce. Since December 2023, Yoasobi and Suntory Draft Beer collaborated on numerous projects, such as a pop-up store at Shinagawa Station, limited screened beer cans, "Yoasobeer Project" commercials, etc. In 2024, the duo collaborated with character Pickles the Frog for special goods to celebrate Ayase's 30th birthday, and battle royale game PUBG: Battlegrounds for its emote. Sportswear brand Asics partnered with the duo for pop-up gallery, Just a Little Step, at Rayard Miyashita Park in November 2024, and launched collaborative products with the concept "Just a Little Step" in March 2026.

In April 2025, the duo was appointed as the brand ambassador for cosmetics brand Shu Uemura, and starred on the smartphone Samsung Galaxy S25 Ultra commercial, portraying themselves being filming on the stage. In 2025–2026, the duo collaborated with PlayStation and cloth brand F. C. Real Bristol for a long-sleeve jersey for selling in-person at the duo's one-off concert in London and online in Japan, Zozotown and Doublet, and PlayStation and arcade Vaultroom for T-shirt and hoodie. In 2026, Yoasobi partnered with Apple Fitness+ to launch exercise playlists designed around the duo's songs, Overwatch for the characters' skins inspired by the duo's aesthetic, featuring ambient VFX, Kanji-inspired motifs, and dance emote, Taco Bell Japan for limited special Y-Burrito, Ultra Milk for a promotional campaign, and Line Friends for stickers.

== Impact and achievements ==
Yoasobi has been credited as a pioneer and representative of Japanese pop scene in the 2020s (Note: Attributed to Real Sound, Billboard Japan, and The Japan Times.) and the Reiwa era. (Note: Attributed to Brutus, Diamond, and Real Sound.) According to Oricon, the duo was the top-ten best-selling artist in Japan in 2021, 2023, and 2024, grossing ¥6.07 billion, ¥5.75 billion, and ¥4.37 billion, respectively. For digital platforms, the duo also grossed ¥3.147 billion in 2022, ¥4.59 billion in 2023 (the best-selling of that year), ¥3.61 billion in 2024, and ¥2.59 billion in 2025. As of December 2023, Oricon named the duo the tenth best-selling artist in Reiwa era so far, earning ¥17.06 billion; "Yoru ni Kakeru", "Kaibutsu" / "Yasashii Suisei", "Idol", and "Gunjō" inside the top-20 best-selling singles; and The Book the twentieth best-selling album. As of August 2026, Yoasobi was the third most streamed artist in Japan on Oricon, following Mrs. Green Apple and Official Hige Dandism, with 8.96 billion times, grossing ¥18.81 billion.

For the Billboard Japan, the duo has placed in the top ten on the year-end Artist 100 (formerly Top Artist) since 2020: number eight in 2020, number two in 2021 and 2022, number one in 2023, number three in 2024, and number nine in 2025. In July 2026, the duo exceeded ten billion streams in Japan, compiled by Billboard Japan, the fourth artist to achieve this milestone, following Mrs. Green Apple, Official Hige Dandism, and Back Number. Since Billboard Japan and Oricon began tracking on-demand streams, "Yoru ni Kakeru" became the first-ever song to surpass 500 million and one billion on-demand streams in Japan. These resulted in the Recording Industry Association of Japan (RIAJ) certifying the song the first-ever diamond and double diamond in history. Abema Times dubbed the success of "Yoru ni Kakeru" as a symbol of the beginning of the streaming era in Japan, where originally favored the CD format. Furthermore, "Idol" also broke the record for the fastest song to exceed 100 million to one billion streams at that time in 137 weeks, and to be certified streaming diamond by the RIAJ within 295 days since its release.

Yoasobi is credited as one of the artists who re-popularize J-pop internationally, following the decline in the 2010s. The popularity includes in South Korea, where the import of Japanese culture used to be prevented due to Japanese occupation of Korea for 35 years. Content creator and Tamago Production founder Kim Gye-ran cited Yoasobi, as well as manga series Oshi no Ko and Bocchi the Rock!, inspired him to form a all-female rock band QWER. According to the online magazine Nippon.com, Yoasobi is the most listened-to Japanese artist since 2023. Spotify reported that the duo was the most-streamed Japanese artist outside Japan for four consecutive years, from 2021 to 2024, (Note: References:) and the second most-streamed in 2025. Apple Music listed their songs "Yoru ni Kakeru", "Idol", and "Gunjō" among the 500 most-streamed songs for the service between 2015 and 2025.

== Accolades ==
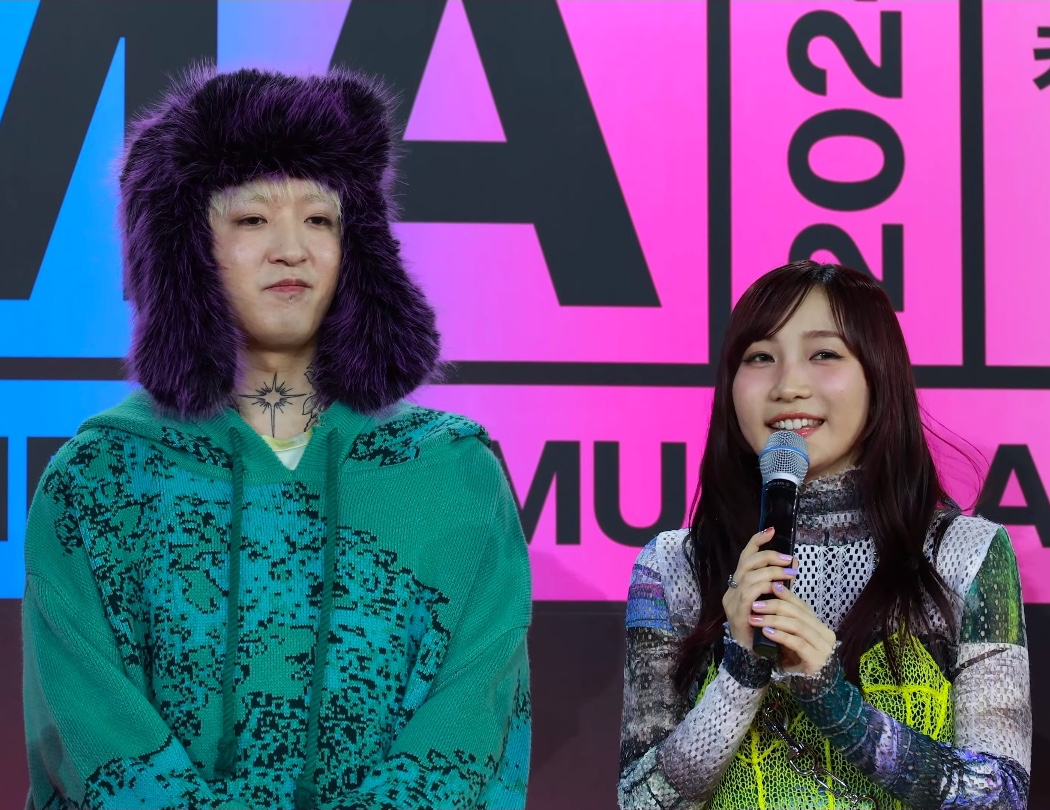
Yoasobi at the 2024 Melon Music Awards

Yoasobi has won numerous industrial awards throughout their career, including ten Japan Gold Disc Awards, five CD Shop Awards, four MTV Video Music Awards Japan, three Music Awards Japan, three Space Shower Music Awards, three Reiwa Anisong Awards, two Japan Record Awards, one Crunchyroll Anime Award, and one Melon Music Award, among others. In 2021, Yoasobi received the Noma Publishing Culture Award by Kodansha in honors of excellent contributions to publishing, regardless of its forms, alongside manga artist Hajime Isayama, author and lyricist Shizuka Ijūin, and Kadokawa Culture Museum. The duo won Person of the Year at the 2023 Japan PR Awards, organized by the Public Relations Society of Japan. In 2025, Yoasobi was nominated at the inaugural Music Awards Japan for 14 categories, three for the artist and 11 for "Idol". It is the third most nomination following Fujii Kaze (17) and Creepy Nuts (15), which "Idol" won four awards—Top Global Hit from Japan, Best Anime Song, Best Music Video, and Song of the Year for Creators.

== Members ==
- Ayase – songwriter, producer, keyboards, synthesizer, sampler
- Ikura – vocals

Current band members

- Ash – guitar
- Sota Morimitsu – bass guitar
- Ena Suzuki – keyboard
- Kazuya Oi – drums
- Hiroki Oono – drums

Former band members

- Zacro Misohagi – keyboards, backing vocals
- Honogumo – drums
- Hikaru Yamamoto – bass guitar, synth bass
- Satoru Taguchi – guitar
- Tatsuya Amano – drums

== Discography ==
Japanese-language EPs

- The Book (2021)
- The Book 2 (2021)
- Hajimete no – EP (2023)
- The Book 3 (2023)
- The Book For, (2026)

English-language EPs

- E-Side (2021)
- E-Side 2 (2022)
- E-Side 3 (2024)
- E-Side 4 (2026)

== Filmography ==
=== Film ===
| Title | Year | Role | Note | Ref. |
|---|---|---|---|---|
| Yoasobi 5th Anniversary Dome Live 2024 "Surrealism" | 2025 | Themselves | Concert film | |

=== Television ===
| Title | Year | Role | Note | Ref. |
|---|---|---|---|---|
| Jōnetsu Tairiku | 2021 | Themselves | Documentary | |
| NHK Music Special Yoasobi: Shōsetsu o Ongaku ni Suru Mahō | 2023 | Themselves | Television special | |
| Yoasobi 18Fes | 2023 | Themselves | Television special | |
| NHK Special: Sekai ni Hibiku Uta, Nikkan Pops Shinjidai | 2024 | Themselves | Television special | |
| Yoasobi Sekai o Kakeru | 2025 | Themselves | Television special | |
| Renzoku Terebi Shōsetsu "Blossom" Shudaika ga Dekiru made | 2026 | Themselves | Television special | |

=== Radio shows ===
| Title | Year | Role | Ref. |
|---|---|---|---|
| Yoasobi's All Night Nippon X | 2021–2022 | Host | |
| Yoasobi's Otsumami Radio | 2023–2024 | Host | |
| Yoasobi's Yoareal | 2026 | Host | |

== Concert tours ==
Headlining

- Denkōsekka Arena Tour (2023)
- Yoasobi Asia Tour (2023–2024)
- Pop Out Zepp Tour (2024)
- Yoasobi Live in the USA (2024)
- Chō-genjitsu Dome Live (2024)
- Chō-genjitsu Asia Tour (2024–2025)
- Wandara Hall Tour (2025)
- Never Ending Stories Tour (2026)
- Super Planet Tour (2026–2027)

Supporting

- Coldplay – Music of the Spheres World Tour (2023)
- Billie Eilish – Hit Me Hard and Soft: The Tour (2025)
- Radwimps – Radwimps 20th Anniversary Live Tour (2025)

== Bibliography ==
- The Yoasobi Magazine. Magazine House. November 2021. ISBN 978-48-38-75522-6.
- 別冊カドカワ 総力特集 YOASOBI [Separate Kadokawa Special Volume Yoasobi]. Kadokawa Shoten. October 4, 2023. ISBN 978-40-48-97655-8.
- Vi/Nyl Super Yoasobi 5th Anniversary Book. Caelum. October 30, 2024.
