= E-Side =

EP by Yoasobi
- Released: November 12, 2021
- Genre: J-pop
- Length: 31:49
- Language: English
- Label: Sony Japan
- Producer: Ayase

Yoasobi chronology
The Book (2021)	E-Side (2021)	The Book 2 (2021)

Singles from E-Side
- 1. "Into the Night" Released: July 2, 2021; 2. "RGB" Released: July 16, 2021; 3. "Monster" Released: July 30, 2021; 4. "Blue" Released: October 29, 2021

E-Side is the debut English-language EP (second overall) by Japanese duo Yoasobi. It was released on November 12, 2021, through Sony Music Entertainment Japan. The EP consists of eight tracks from the duo's songs in the English language, including their previous-release singles "Into the Night", "RGB", "Monster", and "Blue". Konnie Aoki is in charge of translating all tracks into English. Commercially, E-Side debuted at number 19 on the Oricon Combined Albums Chart and number nine on the Billboard Japan Hot Albums.

== Background ==
Yoasobi released their first English-language song, titled "Into the Night" on July 2, 2021, which was translated from the duo's "Yoru ni Kakeru" by Konnie Aoki. It was peaked at number 44 on the Oricon Combined Singles Chart, and number two on the Digital Singles Chart. Later, they also released "RGB" from "Sangenshoku" on July 16, "Monster" from "Kaibutsu" on July 30, and "Blue" from "Gunjō" on October 29, the same day as E-Side announcement. All tracks debuted on the Oricon Digital Singles Chart at number ten, eleven, and thirteen, respectively.

The duo revealed on their radio show, Yoasobi's All Night Nippon X that the EP title E-Side was decided by Nippon Broadcasting System. According to Ayase in a Paper interview, the meanings of the songs had not been changed in the EP and that Yoasobi was trying to appeal to overseas fans. In a Nylon interview in February 2022, Yoasobi said that they take into consideration the sound structure to choose the songs to make an English version. They said that the songs they chose should not interfere with the original and should still be able to be understood in English.

== Release and promotion ==
Yoasobi announced their first English-language EP, titled E-Side on October 29, 2021, the same day as "Blue" release, alongside its track listing, and cover artwork, scheduled for release on November 12 to digital music and streaming platforms only, as part of "Yoasobi Nice to Meet You Countdown" to announce the duo's new information every Friday for ten weeks until their one-off concert Nice to Meet You. The cover artwork of E-Side depicts a red pixel art on the bottom of the gray background with darker gray pixels and places the duo's slogan "Novel into Music" below the EP's title, designed by Mina Sakurai.

The EP contains four previous-release English songs, and four new English-translated songs: "Haven't" from "Tabun", "Comet" from "Yasashii Suisei, "Encore", and "Tracing a Dream" from "Ano Yume o Nazotte". The duo uploaded the EP's snippets as the "crossfade movie" on November 7. The full song of "Comet", and "Tracing a Dream" were played for the first time at their radio show Yoasobi's All Night Nippon X on November 10, due to asking fans via Twitter poll. The accompanying music videos of the all new tracks were premiered alongside the EP release since midnight JST. LED billboards for advertising the EP were also placed in New York City, United States.

== Commercial performance ==
In Japan, E-Side entered the Oricon Combined Albums Chart at number 19 and debuted atop the Digital Albums Chart, selling 3,305 units. The EP entered Billboard Japan Hot Albums at number nine. It opened with 2,847 digital sales, charting number two on the Download Albums, behind only Silk Sonic's An Evening with Silk Sonic, which debuted atop with 2,891 digital sales.

== Track listing ==
All tracks are written by Ayase and translated to English by Konnie Aoki.

E-Side track listing
No.	Title	Length
1.	"Into the Night"	4:19
2.	"Haven't"	4:16
3.	"Monster"	3:25
4.	"Comet"	3:33
5.	"RGB"	3:39
6.	"Encore"	4:30
7.	"Blue"	4:06
8.	"Tracing a Dream"	4:01
Total length:		31:49

Notes

- All tracks are noted as "English version" in some music streaming services.

== Credits and personnel ==
Credits adapted from the official website.

- Ayase – songwriter, producer
- Ikura – vocals
- Konnie Aoki – English translation

== Charts ==
=== Weekly charts ===
Weekly chart performance for E-Side
Chart (2021)	Peak position
Japanese Combined Albums (Oricon)	19
Japanese Hot Albums (Billboard Japan)	9

=== Year-end charts ===
2021 year-end chart performance for E-Side
Chart (2021)	Position
Japanese Download Albums (Billboard Japan)	63

2022 year-end chart performance for E-Side
Chart (2022)	Position
Japanese Download Albums (Billboard Japan)	35

== Sales ==
Sales figures for E-Side
Region	Certification	Certified units/sales
Japan Digital	—	9,468

== Release history ==
Release dates and formats for E-Side
Region	Date	Format	Label	Ref.
Various	November 12, 2021	Digital download; streaming	Sony Japan	
