= The Noise (song) =

Promotional single by Le Sserafim and Yoasobi
- Language: Japanese; English
- Released: September 26, 2025
- Genre: City pop; soul; R&B
- Label: Source; Virgin
- Songwriters: Ayase; Hiroshi Fujiwara; Matt Cab; Matz; Grace
- Producer: Tokyo Coffee Break

Music video
- "The Noise" on YouTube

"The Noise" is a song by South Korean girl group Le Sserafim and Japanese duo Yoasobi. It was released as a promotional single through Source Music and Virgin Music on September 26, 2025, to commemorate the 20th anniversary of the fashion e-commerce website Zozotown. Written by Ayase, Hiroshi Fujiwara, Matt Cab, Matz, and Grace, the song sampled Yoasobi's 2019 single "Yoru ni Kakeru".

== Background and release ==
On July 30, 2025, fashion e-commerce website Zozotown announced Zozofes, to commemorate the 20th anniversary of the website, to be held at K-Arena Yokohama on October 12 and 13. It was described as a special event that "combines fashion and music", centered on the theme of "Y2K". The first lineup to perform on October 13 was revealed concurrently, with Le Sserafim and Yoasobi. The event stated that the attending artists would perform a collaborative song for the commemoration. On September 22, a collaborative song by Le Sserafim and Yoasobi was unveiled, titled "The Noise", and was released on September 26.

== Composition ==
"The Noise" contains a sample of Yoasobi's 2019 single "Yoru ni Kakeru" and the producer team Tokyo Coffee Break handled the partially new lyrics, remixing, and re-arrangement, fusing the city pop and Y2K styles, which suited Zozofes's theme. Compared to the original, the song was transformed to a slower BPM, and a "sweet and soft" soul and R&B sound. Ikura sang the original lyrics, while Le Sserafim sang the newly written lyrics.

== Promotion and other uses ==
Le Sserafim and Yoasobi's Ikura debuted the live performance of "The Noise" at Zozofes, held at K-Arena Yokohama on October 13, 2025. The song was featured on Zozotown's online commercials "Suki ni, Kiyō ze", starring Airu Kubozuka and Mei Hata. An accompanying music video for the song was released on November 27.

== Credits and personnel ==
- Ikura – vocals
- Le Sserafim – vocals
- Ayase – songwriter
- Hiroshi Fujiwara – songwriter
- Matt Cab – songwriter
- Matz – songwriter
- Grace – songwriter
- Hama Okamoto – bass guitar
- Ryusei – mixing engineering

== Charts ==
Chart performance for "The Noise"
Chart (2025)	Peak position
Japan Download Songs (Billboard Japan)	60

== Release history ==
Release dates and formats for "The Noise"
Region	Date	Format	Label	Ref.
Various	September 26, 2025	Digital download; streaming	Source; Virgin	
