= Halzion =

2020 single by Yoasobi

Single by Yoasobi

from the EP The Book
- Language: Japanese
- Released: May 11, 2020
- Genre: J-pop
- Length: 3:18
- Label: Sony Japan
- Songwriter: Ayase
- Producer: Ayase

Yoasobi singles chronology
| "Ano Yume o Nazotte" (2020) | "Halzion" (2020) | "Tabun" (2020) |

Music video
- "Halzion" on YouTube; English version on YouTube

"Halzion" or "Harujion" (Japanese: ハルジオン; lit. 'Philadelphia fleabane') is a song by Japanese duo Yoasobi from their debut EP, The Book (2021). It was released as a single on May 11, 2020, through Sony Music Entertainment Japan. The song depicts the protagonist who spends days of disappointment after parting with her lover, finding hope while re-questioning her dreams and the meaning of life, and regains her motivation to move into the future. The English version of the song was included on the duo's second English-language EP E-Side 2, released on November 18, 2022.

"Halzion" was based on Soredemo, Happy End, a short story written by Hashizume Shunki, marking the first time that Yoasobi collaborated with a professional novelist. Unlike the duo's former two songs, the source material was not based on the novel-centered social media Monogatary.com. The song and the story it is based on were released as part of an advertising campaign Immersive Song Project by Suntory, to promote their new energy drink branded Zone.

== Usage in media ==
Besides Zone, "Halzion" also appeared in EA's 2014 video game, The Sims 4, which was added into the base game via the November 10, 2020 game update. It can be heard through the S-Pop (Sim-Pop) radio station and has been re-written in Simlish language. Additionally, the song appeared on the 2020 Gekidan No Meets stage Mukō no Kuni, and Nintendo Switch 2021 televised advertisement Jibun Jikan-hen.

== Credits and personnel ==
Song

- Ayase – producer, songwriter
- Ikura – vocals
- Shunki Hashizume – based story writer
- Takayuki Saitō – vocal recording
- Masahiko Fukui – mixing
- Hidekazu Sakai – mastering

Music video

- Toshitaka Shinoda (Ijigen Tokyo) – director
- Yuuki "Youkiss" Ookubo (Ijigen Tokyo) – production
- Rabbit Machine – 2D animation director
- No.1Ø – 2D lead animator
- Fungakki – 2D animator
- Yuta Kuniyasu (Calf) – illustrator, animation director, animator
- Ryo Okawara – animation director, animator
- Shuma Hirose (Calf) – animation producer
- Ippei Kurahashi – animator
- Kanae Miya – animator
- Yoshihiko Shimoda – animator
- Takayuki Oguma – composite editor (DTJ)
- Matawe Wongpuak – assistant editor (DTJ)

== Charts ==
=== Weekly charts ===
Weekly chart performance for "Halzion"
| Chart (2020–2021) | Peak position |
|---|---|
| Global Excl. US (Billboard) | 125 |
| Japan Combined Singles (Oricon) | 7 |
| Japan Hot 100 (Billboard) | 10 |

=== Year-end charts ===
2020 year-end chart performance for "Halzion"
| Chart (2020) | Position |
|---|---|
| Japan Hot 100 (Billboard) | 34 |

2021 year-end chart performance for "Halzion"
| Chart (2021) | Position |
|---|---|
| Japan Hot 100 (Billboard) | 26 |

2022 year-end chart performance for "Halzion"
| Chart (2022) | Position |
|---|---|
| Japan Streaming Songs (Billboard Japan) | 92 |

== Certifications ==
Certifications for "Halzion"
| Region | Certification | Certified units/sales |
|---|---|---|
| Japan (RIAJ) | Gold | 100,000^{*} |
Streaming
| Japan (RIAJ) | 3× Platinum | 300,000,000^{†} |
^{*} Sales figures based on certification alone.^{†} Streaming-only figures based on certification alone.

== Release history ==
Release dates and formats for "Halzion"
| Region | Date | Format | Label | Ref. |
|---|---|---|---|---|
| Various | May 11, 2020 | Digital download; streaming | Sony Japan | |
