= Monogatary.com =

Japanese social network service

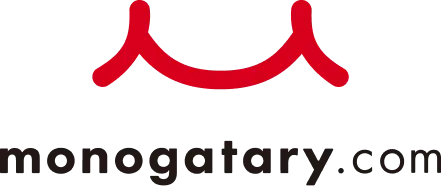
- Logo used since 2023
- Company type: Subsidiary
- Website type: Social networking service
- Available in: Japanese
- Headquarters: Tokyo, Japan
- Area served: Worldwide
- Owner: Sony Music Entertainment Japan
- Founder: Yohei Yashiro
- Website: monogatary.com
- Launched: October 30, 2017
- Current status: Active

Monogatary.com (stylized in all lowercase) is a social networking service website, owned by Japanese entertainment conglomerate Sony Music Entertainment Japan. Taking its name from Japanese word monogatari (物語; lit. 'story'), the website focuses on creative writing and illustration, where users can submit works based on a daily-updated theme. The creative writing can be short stories, essays, poems, haiku, etc. Furthermore, it also incorporates social network service features. The works submitted on Monogatary.com have been adapted into various forms, such as books, audio-books, anime series, films, games, or songs, etc.

Yohei Yashiro launched the website on October 30, 2017. In 2014, Sony Music Marketing (now Sony Music Solutions), a subsidiary of SMEJ, proposed creating a creative writing submission website. Despite internal positive reception, the idea did not align with the company's primary focus on music marketing. A year later, when SMEJ launched its business program EnterLab, SMM's then-supervisor suggested that Yohei Yashiro, who had previously helped with the unsuccessful project, resume the creative writing submission website. Since 2018, the website has hosted an annual fiction contest, Monocon, divided into various categories and awards.

Monogatary.com is best known for its fictional stories that have become sources for songs performed by duo Yoasobi. Notable works include "Yoru ni Kakeru", based on Monocon 2019's one of Sony Music Award winners, Mayo Hoshino's Thanatos no Yūwaku, which was a massive commercial success in early 2020 and established their musical career. The duo and the website later held another contest, the Yoasobi Contest, for three times. Other musical collaborations include Halca, Omoinotake, Kana Nishino, Adieu, Hitsujibungaku, Tatsuya Kitani, Tomori Kusunoki, Reona, Yama, etc.
