= The Book (Yoasobi EP) =

EP by Yoasobi
- Released: January 6, 2021
- Genre: J-pop
- Length: 30:12
- Language: Japanese
- Label: Sony Japan
- Producer: Ayase

Yoasobi chronology
The Book (2021)	E-Side (2021)

Singles from The Book
- 1. "Yoru ni Kakeru" Released: December 15, 2019; 2. "Ano Yume o Nazotte" Released: January 18, 2020; 3. "Halzion" Released: May 11, 2020; 4. "Tabun" Released: July 20, 2020; 5. "Gunjō" Released: September 1, 2020; 6. "Haruka" Released: December 18, 2020

Professional ratings
Review scores
Source	Rating
Sputnikmusic	3.6/5

The Book is the debut EP by Japanese duo Yoasobi. It was released through Sony Music Entertainment Japan on January 6, 2021, the same date as their single "Kaibutsu", which accompanied the second season of the anime series Beastars. A concept of "reading CD" with binder package, the EP consists of all singles released from 2019 to 2020, including their other track "Encore".

The track-by-track cover EP Mikunoyoasobi by Ayase with Vocaloid voicebank Hatsune Miku was released on the same day exclusively at Tower Records Japan.

== Commercial performance ==
The Book debuted at number two on the Oricon Albums Chart, behind SixTones's 1ST, selling 72,238 copies in its first week. and 146,745 copies as of 2021. It topped Oricon Digital Albums Chart for five consecutive weeks and the year-end chart with 100,656 downloads in 2021 alone, becoming the only album to reach this milestone in the year. For Billboard Japan Hot Albums, The Book entered at number two with 74,601 CD copies, and 10,069 download units. The Book received a gold certification for both physical and digital release by Recording Industry Association of Japan (RIAJ). All tracks of the EP, excluding the intro and outro, are also certified platinum or higher for streaming by RIAJ.

== Accolades ==
Awards and nominations for The Book
Ceremony	Year	Category	Result	Ref.
CD Shop Awards	2022	Grand Prix (Red)	Nominated	
CD Shop Awards	2022	Finalist Award	Won	
CD Shop Awards	2022	Special Award	Won	

== Track listing ==
All tracks are written by Ayase.

The Book track listing
No.	Title	Length
1.	"Epilogue"	0:50
2.	"Encore" (アンコール)	4:30
3.	"Halzion" (ハルジオン)	3:18
4.	"Ano Yume o Nazotte" (あの夢をなぞって)	4:03
5.	"Tabun" (たぶん)	4:23
6.	"Gunjō" (群青)	4:08
7.	"Haruka" (ハルカ)	4:04
8.	"Yoru ni Kakeru" (夜に駆ける)	4:21
9.	"Prologue"	0:35
Total length:		30:12

== Credits and personnel ==
- Ayase – songwriter, producer
- Ikura – vocals (2–9)
- Rockwell – guitar (4–5)
- AssH – guitar (6)
- Takeruru – guitar (8)
- Plusonica (Note: Consisting of Narita Ayori, Hikari Codama, Miki Maria, Masa, Miku Motomatsu, Natsumi, Kosei Nishiyama, Saki, Suzu, and Tetsuto) – chorus (6)
- Kanami Minakami – based story writer (2)
- Shunki Hashizume – based story writer (3)
- Sōta Ishiki – based story writer (4)
- Shinano – based story writer (5)
- Alfort Creative Team – based story writer (6)
- Osamu Suzuki – based story writer (7)
- Mayo Hoshino – based story writer (8)
- Takayuki Saitō – vocal recording (2–8)
- Masahiko Fukui – mixing
- Hidekazu Sakai – mastering

== Charts ==
=== Weekly charts ===
Weekly chart performance for The Book
Chart (2021)	Peak position
Japanese Albums (Oricon)	2
Japanese Combined Albums (Oricon)	2
Japanese Hot Albums (Billboard Japan)	2

=== Monthly charts ===
Monthly chart performance for The Book
Chart (2021)	Position
Japanese Albums (Oricon)	2

=== Year-end charts ===
2021 year-end chart performance for The Book
Chart (2021)	Position
Japanese Albums (Oricon)	25
Japanese Combined Albums (Oricon)	5
Japanese Hot Albums (Billboard Japan)	4

2022 year-end chart performance for The Book
Chart (2022)	Position
Japanese Digital Albums (Oricon)	9
Japanese Hot Albums (Billboard Japan)	45

2023 year-end chart performance for The Book
Chart (2023)	Position
Japanese Hot Albums (Billboard Japan)	78

2024 year-end chart performance for The Book
Chart (2024)	Position
Japanese Download Albums (Billboard Japan)	28

2025 year-end chart performance for The Book
Chart (2025)	Position
Japanese Hot Albums (Billboard Japan)	41

== Certifications and sales ==
Certifications and sales figures for The Book
Region	Certification	Certified units/sales
Japan (RIAJ) Physical	Gold	172,512
Japan (RIAJ) Digital	Gold	137,059

== Release history ==
Release dates and formats for The Book
Region	Date	Format	Label	Ref.
Various	January 6, 2021	Digital download; streaming	Sony Japan	
Japan	January 6, 2021	CD	Sony Japan	
Taiwan	October 20, 2023	CD	Sony Taiwan	
Various	July 26, 2024	Vinyl	Sony Germany; Black Screen	
Japan	October 23, 2024	Vinyl	Echoes; Sony Japan	
Various	December 2025	Vinyl	Sony Germany; Black Screen	
