= Ano Yume o Nazotte =

2020 single by Yoasobi

Single by Yoasobi

from the EP The Book
- Language: Japanese
- English title: "Tracing That Dream"
- Released: January 18, 2020
- Genre: J-pop
- Length: 4:02
- Label: Sony Japan
- Songwriter: Ayase
- Producer: Ayase

Yoasobi singles chronology
"Yoru ni Kakeru" (2019)	"Ano Yume o Nazotte" (2020)	"Halzion" (2020)

Alternative cover
- Ballade version cover

Music video
- "Ano Yume o Nazotte" on YouTube "Tracing a Dream" on YouTube "Ano Yume o Nazotte" (ballade version) on YouTube

"Ano Yume o Nazotte" (Japanese: あの夢をなぞって; lit. 'Tracing That Dream') is a song by Japanese duo Yoasobi from their debut EP, The Book (2021). It was released as a single on January 18, 2020, through Sony Music Entertainment Japan. The song was based on the Monocon 2019's Sony Music Award-winning short story, Yume no Shizuku to Hoshi no Hana, written by Sōta Ishiki. The song and its based story are about a love story at a fireworks festival displayed by a high school girl and her classmate boy who would confess to her in her dream. The music video was released two days later.

The English version of the song, titled "Tracing a Dream", was included on the duo's first English-language EP E-Side, released on November 12, 2021. The ballade version, featured on CalorieMate television advertisement, Midnight Train, was released on March 30, 2022. The song also accompanied the live action movie of its based story Yume no Shizuku to Hoshi no Hana, which was released to the vertical theater application Smash on March 24.

The song was playable in the smartphone music game BanG Dream! Girls Band Party! for a limited time between October and November 2021. During a special collaboration event between BanG Dream! franchise and VTuber agency Hololive "Ano Yume o Nazotte" has been covered by Poppin'Party and Tokino Sora. The song featured on Puré Gummy's 2026 commercial, starring Marika Itō.

== Track listing ==
- Digital download and streaming
1. "Ano Yume o Nazotte" (あの夢をなぞって) – 4:02
- Digital download and streaming (ballade version)
1. "Ano Yume o Nazotte" (ballade version) – 3:44

== Credits and personnel ==
- Ayase – songwriter, producer
- Ikura – vocals
- Rockwell – guitar
- Sōta Ishiki – based story writer
- Takayuki Saitō – vocal recording
- Masahiko Fukui – mixing
- Hidekazu Sakai – mastering
- Harumotsu (Koron Koronosuke) – music video animation, cover artwork design

== Charts ==
=== Weekly charts ===
Weekly chart performance for "Ano Yume o Nazotte"
Chart (2020)	Peak position
Japan Combined Singles (Oricon)	29
Japan Hot 100 (Billboard)	32

Weekly chart performance for "Ano Yume o Nazotte" (ballade version)
Chart (2022)	Peak position
Japan Digital Singles (Oricon)	4
Japan Download Songs (Billboard Japan)	5

=== Year-end charts ===
2020 year-end chart performance for "Ano Yume o Nazotte"
Chart (2020)	Position
Japan Download Songs (Billboard Japan)	69
Japan Streaming Songs (Billboard Japan)	76

2021 year-end chart performance for "Ano Yume o Nazotte"
Chart (2021)	Position
Japan Hot 100 (Billboard)	67

2022 year-end chart performance for "Ano Yume o Nazotte"
Chart (2022)	Position
Japan Streaming Songs (Billboard Japan)	90

== Certifications ==
Certifications for "Ano Yume o Nazotte"
Region	Certification	Certified units/sales
Japan (RIAJ)	Gold	100,000^{*}
Streaming
Japan (RIAJ)	3× Platinum	300,000,000^{†}
^{*} Sales figures based on certification alone.^{†} Streaming-only figures based on certification alone.

== Release history ==
Release dates and formats for "Ano Yume o Nazotte"
Region	Date	Format	Version	Label	Ref.
Various	January 19, 2020	Digital download; streaming	Original	Sony Japan	
Various	March 30, 2022	Digital download; streaming	Ballade	Sony Japan	
