= Avantgardey =

Japanese dance company

- Origin: Japan
- Years active: 2022–present
- Members: Nona; Pani; Moca; Fuka; Seira; Nagano; Ayane; Sono; Harune; Miyuu; Macchan; Aimu; Kotone; Kohana; Chacha; Ui
- Past members: Mizuho; Kanami; Aoi; Rico; Oya
- Website: akanekikaku.com/avantgardey

Avantgardey (アバンギャルディ, Abangyarudi) is a Japanese dance troupe formed in 2022 that performs internationally and in Japan.

== History ==
Akane is the founder and lead choreographer of Avantgardey in 2022 and the dance troupe was managed under choreographer’s independent production banner Akane Kikaku.

Avantgardey is a troupe of 16 female dancers who wear jumper skirt uniforms and bob hairstyles. Some of the dancers were originally from the Tomioka High School dance club. They perform highly synchronized routines and reportedly have exaggerated expressions and deadpan stares.

According to the Japanese government, the troupe has worldwide popularity. The group participated in the USA on television in 2023 on America's Got Talent. Their choreography has been described as precise, humor laced, and quirky.

The troupe has appeared in Singapore and Hong Kong. The troupe has also performed in Malaysia and Taiwan. In Malaysia, one of their performances was attended by the Ambassador of Japan to Malaysia.

The Government of Macau has designated the troupe as "internationally renowned" in November 2025. Avantgardey was also the recipient of the Blooming Yako Flowering Award in December 2025.

== Members ==
=== Current members ===
- Nona
- Pani
- Moca
- Fuka
- Seira
- Nagano
- Ayane
- Sono
- Harune
- Miyuu
- Macchan
- Aimu
- Kotone
- Kohana
- Chacha
- Ui

=== Former members ===
- Mizuho (2022–2023)
- Kanami (2022–2023)
- Aoi (2022–2024)
- Rico (2022–2024)
- Oya (2022–2026)
