= Encore (Yoasobi song) =

2021 promotional single by Yoasobi

Promotional single by Yoasobi

from the EP The Book
- Language: Japanese
- Released: July 2, 2021
- Genre: J-pop
- Length: 4:30
- Label: Sony Japan
- Songwriter: Ayase
- Producer: Ayase

Music video
- "Encore" on YouTube; English version on YouTube

"Encore" (Japanese: アンコール, Hepburn: Ankōru) is a song by Japanese duo Yoasobi, taken from their debut EP The Book, released on January 6, 2021, through Sony Music Entertainment Japan. Later, the song was released as a promotional single on July 2, to commemorate the song's 100 million streams achievement and its own cover artwork. The English version was included on the duo's first English-language EP, E-Side, released on November 12.

The song was based on the short story Sekai no Owari to, Sayonara no Uta ("The End of the World, and the Goodbye Song") written by Kanami Minakami and won the Yoasobi Contest Vol. 1. The story is about a man and a woman who meet in a warehouse full of old musical instruments before the world ends. The song also featured in Google Pixel 5, Pixel 4a (5G) advertisement.

== Credits and personnel ==
Song

- Ayase – producer, songwriter
- Ikura – vocals
- Kamina Minakami – based story writer
- Takayuki Saitō – vocal recording
- Masahiko Fukui – mixing
- Hidekazu Sakai – mastering

Music video

- Bun – illustration, animation
- Ocha – assistant
- Kairi – motion graphic, animation

== Charts ==
=== Weekly charts ===
Weekly chart performance for "Encore"
Chart (2021)	Peak position
Global 200 (Billboard)	177
Japan Combined Singles (Oricon)	9
Japan Hot 100 (Billboard)	8

=== Year-end charts ===
Year-end chart performance for "Encore"
Chart (2021)	Position
Japan Hot 100 (Billboard)	32

== Certifications ==
Certifications for "Encore"
Region	Certification	Certified units/sales
Japan (RIAJ)	Gold	100,000^{*}
Streaming
Japan (RIAJ)	2× Platinum	200,000,000^{†}
^{*} Sales figures based on certification alone.^{†} Streaming-only figures based on certification alone.

== Release history ==
Release dates and formats for "Encore"
Region	Date	Format	Label	Ref.
Various	July 2, 2021	Digital download; streaming	Sony Japan	
