= Yoru ni Kakeru =

Single by Yoasobi

from the EP The Book
- Language: Japanese
- English title: "Into the Night"
- Published: November 16, 2019
- Released: December 15, 2019
- Genre: J-pop
- Length: 4:21
- Label: Sony Japan
- Songwriter: Ayase
- Producer: Ayase

Yoasobi singles chronology
"Yoru ni Kakeru" (2019)	"Ano Yume o Nazotte" (2020)

Music video
- "Yoru ni Kakeru" on YouTube "Into the Night" on YouTube

"Yoru ni Kakeru" (Japanese: 夜に駆ける; lit. 'Racing into the Night') is the debut single by Japanese duo Yoasobi from their debut EP, The Book (2021). Its music video was first uploaded via YouTube on November 16, 2019, before being officially released on December 15, 2019, by Sony Music Entertainment Japan. The song was based on Mayo Hoshino's short story, An Invitation from Thanatos (タナトスの誘惑, Tanatosu no Yūwaku; lit. 'The Temptation of Thanatos'), which won the Sony Music Award at the novel contest Monocon 2019 and was published on the creative writing social media Monogatary.com.

The song and story depict a man who is fascinated by a personification of death, Thanatos, who sent him a message, "goodbye", and he tries to stop his girlfriend from suicide by jumping from height. The Hatsune Miku covered version of the song was included on member Ayase's EPs Ghost City Tokyo (2019), and Mikunoyoasobi (2021). The English version translated by Konnie Aoki, titled "Into the Night", was released on July 2, 2021, as Yoasobi's first English song. The song won Song of the Year at the MTV Video Music Awards Japan and landed Yoasobi a position as one of the Best 5 New Artists at the 35th Japan Gold Disc Award.

== Reception ==
An accompanying music video for "Yoru ni Kakeru" was first published on Ayase's YouTube channel on November 16, 2019, and its view count surpassed 10 million in 5 months. Soon after its release, the song topped the popularity charts on Spotify and Line Music, and went viral on social media during the COVID-19 pandemic in Japan. Abema Times called the song a symbol of the beginning of streaming era in Japan. "Yoru ni Kakeru" was widely used as meme about contrasting between bubbly pop sound and the lyrics about depression and suicide.

"Yoru ni Kakeru" debuted at number 76 on the Billboard Japan Hot 100 for the issue dated March 30, 2020, and peaked at number one two months later. The song topped the chart for three consecutive weeks, total six weeks. The song finished 2020 as the year's top Japan Hot 100 song, becoming the first single not released on CD to do so. On September 13, 2023, Billboard Japan reported that the song was the first ever to surpass 1 billion streams in the chart's history. On April 12, 2024, Oricon named the song the most streamed song in the Reiwa era so far (2019–) with 859 million streams. On May 28, 2025, "Yoru ni Kakeru" became the first song to exceed 1 billion streams since Oricon began tracking streams.

In October 2021, "Yoru ni Kakeru" was certified diamond by the Recording Industry Association of Japan (RIAJ). It exceeded 500 million on-demand streams in Japan, and went double diamond for one billion streams in April 2025, making it the first ever song to reach these milestones in RIAJ history. Apple Music ranked the song number 91 in the most streamed song on the platform of all time (2015–2025), the best-performing Japanese act.

== Live performances and usage in media ==
On May 15, 2020, Yoasobi's member Ikura appeared on the YouTube channel The First Take to perform the re-arranged version of "Yoru ni Kakeru", as The Home Take. Yoasobi, as a duo with band members, gave the televised debut performance of "Yoru ni Kakeru" at 71st NHK Kōhaku Uta Gassen on December 31, filmed at Bookshelf Theater, Kadokawa Culture Center. It made the duo the first-ever artist to perform at the TV special without any album release. During their debut EP The Book promotion, they performed the song at CDTV Live! Live! on January 18, alongside "Encore", and Music Station on January 22.

"Yoru ni Kakeru" was used in several McDonald's Japan's advertisements, such as the 2024 McDouble commercial, and the 2025 "Tirori Mix" with Ado's "Yoru no Pierrot" and Hoshimachi Suisei's "Bibbidida".

In 2025, Yoasobi collaborated with South Korean girl group Le Sserafim on the song "The Noise", a promotional single which contains a sample of "Yoru ni Kakeru".

== Accolades ==
Awards and nominations for "Yoru ni Kakeru"
Award ceremony	Year	Award	Result	Ref.
JASRAC Awards	2023	Silver Prize	Won	
MTV Video Music Awards Japan	2020	Song of the Year	Won	
Space Shower Music Awards	2021	Song of the Year	Won	

== Track listing ==
- Digital download and streaming
1. "Yoru ni Kakeru" (夜に駆ける) – 4:21
- Digital download and streaming (English version)
1. "Into the Night" – 4:22
- Digital download and streaming (The First Take version)
1. "Yoru ni Kakeru" – From the First Take – 4:08

== Credits and personnel ==
- Ayase – songwriter, producer
- Ikura – vocals
- Takeruru – guitar
- Mayo Hoshino – based story writer
- Takayuki Saitō – vocal recording
- Masahiko Fukui – mixing
- Hidekazu Sakai – mastering
- Nina Ai – music video animation, cover artwork design

== Charts ==
=== Weekly charts ===
Weekly chart performance for "Yoru ni Kakeru"
Chart (2020–2022)	Peak position
Global 200 (Billboard)	16
Hong Kong (Billboard)	13
Japan Combined Singles (Oricon)	1
Japan Hot 100 (Billboard)	1
Singapore Regional (RIAS)	20
US World Digital Song Sales (Billboard)	24

Weekly chart performance for "Into the Night"
Chart (2021)	Peak position
Japan Combined Singles (Oricon)	44

Weekly chart performance for "Yoru ni Kakeru" (from The First Take)
Chart (2023)	Peak position
Japan Digital Singles (Oricon)	48
Japan Download Songs (Billboard Japan)	69

=== Year-end charts ===
2020 year-end chart performance for "Yoru ni Kakeru"
Chart (2020)	Position
Japan Combined Singles (Oricon)	9
Japan Hot 100 (Billboard)	1

2021 year-end chart performance for "Yoru ni Kakeru"
Chart (2021)	Position
Global 200 (Billboard)	55
Japan Combined Singles (Oricon)	5
Japan Hot 100 (Billboard)	3

2022 year-end chart performance for "Yoru ni Kakeru"
Chart (2022)	Position
Global Excl. US (Billboard)	185
Japan Hot 100 (Billboard)	15

2023 year-end chart performance for "Yoru ni Kakeru"
Chart (2023)	Position
Japan Hot 100 (Billboard)	34

2024 year-end chart performance for "Yoru ni Kakeru"
Chart (2024)	Position
Japan Hot 100 (Billboard)	50

2025 year-end chart performance for "Yoru ni Kakeru"
Chart (2025)	Position
Japan Streaming Songs (Billboard Japan)	74

=== All-time charts ===
All-time chart performance for "Yoru ni Kakeru"
Chart (2008–2022)	Position
Japan Hot 100 (Billboard)	2

== Certifications ==
Certifications for "Yoru ni Kakeru"
Region	Certification	Certified units/sales
Japan (RIAJ)	3× Platinum	750,000^{*}
New Zealand (RMNZ)	Gold	15,000^{‡}
Streaming
Japan (RIAJ)	2× Diamond	1,000,000,000^{†}
^{*} Sales figures based on certification alone.^{‡} Sales+streaming figures based on certification alone.^{†} Streaming-only figures based on certification alone.

== Release history ==
Release dates and formats for "Yoru ni Kakeru"
Region	Date	Format	Version	Label	Ref.
Various	December 15, 2019	Digital download; streaming	Original (Japanese)	Sony Japan	
Various	October 29, 2021	Digital download; streaming	English ("Into the Night")	Sony Japan	
Various	September 21, 2023	Digital download; streaming	From The First Take	Sony Japan	

== See also ==
- List of Hot 100 number-one singles of 2020 (Japan)
