= Tabun (song) =

2020 single by Yoasobi

Single by Yoasobi

from the EP The Book
- Language: Japanese
- English title: "Haven't"
- Released: July 20, 2020
- Genre: J-pop
- Length: 4:18
- Label: Sony Japan
- Songwriter: Ayase
- Producer: Ayase

Yoasobi singles chronology
"Halzion" (2020)	"Tabun" (2020)	"Gunjō" (2020)

Music video
- "Tabun" on YouTube "Haven't" on YouTube

"Tabun" (Japanese: たぶん; lit. 'Probably') is a song by Japanese duo Yoasobi from their debut EP, The Book (2021). It was released as a single on July 20, 2020, through Sony Music Entertainment Japan. The song was based on the short story of the same name by Shinano and won the Yoasobi Contest Vol. 1. A middle tempo song, it depicts a couple breaking up in the morning. The song also featured on the film, Tabun, based on the same story.

The English version of the song, titled "Haven't", was included on the duo's first English-language EP E-Side, released on November 12, 2021. The song went viral on TikTok in 2022 through its use in artificial intelligence manga filter.

== Credits and personnel ==
- Ayase – songwriter, producer
- Ikura – vocals
- Rockwell – guitar
- Shinano – based story writer
- Takayuki Saitō – vocal recording
- Masahiko Fukui – mixing
- Hidekazu Sakai – mastering
- Saho Nanjō – music video animation, cover artwork design

== Charts ==
=== Weekly charts ===
Weekly chart performance for "Tabun"
Chart (2020–2021)	Peak position
Global Excl. US (Billboard)	139
Japan Combined Singles (Oricon)	11
Japan Hot 100 (Billboard)	15

=== Year-end charts ===
2020 year-end chart performance for "Tabun"
Chart (2020)	Position
Japan Hot 100 (Billboard)	89

2021 year-end chart performance for "Tabun"
Chart (2021)	Position
Japan Hot 100 (Billboard)	59

== Certifications ==
Certifications for "Tabun"
Region	Certification	Certified units/sales
Japan (RIAJ)	Gold	100,000^{*}
Streaming
Japan (RIAJ)	2× Platinum	200,000,000^{†}
^{*} Sales figures based on certification alone.^{†} Streaming-only figures based on certification alone.

== Release history ==
Release dates and formats for "Tabun"
Region	Date	Format	Label	Ref.
Various	July 20, 2020	Digital download; streaming	Sony Japan	
