= List of Yoasobi live performances =

Yoasobi live performances
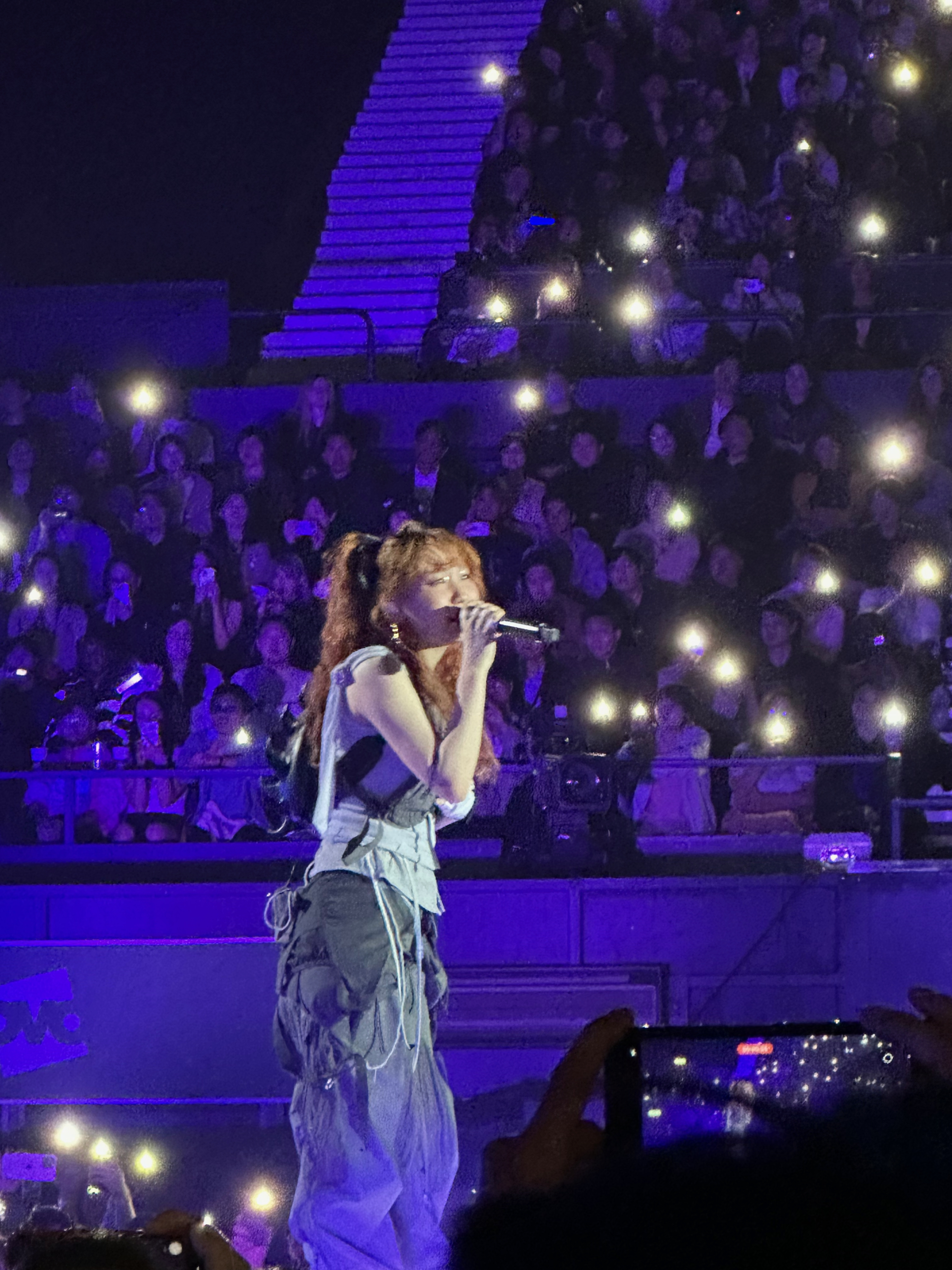
- Ikura on the 2025 concert at Wembley Arena, London
- Concert tours: 9
- One-off concerts: 5
- Music festivals: 29
- Awards shows: 5
- Television shows: 22
- Radio shows: 1
- Other performances: 10

The following is a comprehensive list of live performances by Japanese duo Yoasobi. They have performed on nine concert tours and five one-off concerts, as well as numerous music festivals, award shows, and live performances on television, radio, and online in Japan and overseas.

Debuted in late 2019, Yoasobi did not perform live during their early career due to COVID-19 pandemic, except The Home Take, the pandemic-restricted edition of The First Take in May 2020, where only Ikura appeared to perform the re-arranged "Yoru ni Kakeru", which boosted the song's popularity. Initially did not attend, Yoasobi made their debut live performance of "Yoru ni Kakeru" as a duo on December 31, 2020, at the 71st edition of the year-end television special NHK Kōhaku Uta Gassen, making them the first-ever artist to perform at the event without any physical releases.

In 2021, in support of their debut EP, The Book, Yoasobi held two livestream concerts: Keep Out Theater in February and Uniqlo-sponsored Sing Your World in July. The duo launched their first face-to-face one-off concert, Nice to Meet You, in December at Nippon Budokan. They also debuted on various music programs that year before concluding the year at the 72nd NHK Kōhaku Uta Gassen with the performances of "Gunjō" with symphony orchestra, and "Tsubame", featuring Midories. Since 2022, Yoasobi has attended numerous music festivals, debuting at the Rock in Japan Festival in August and at their first overseas Head in the Clouds Festival in Indonesia in December.

In 2023, Yoasobi embarked on their first headlining concert tour, Denkōsekka Arena Tour, between April and June, amassed 130,000 attendees, and opened Tokyo shows for British rock band Coldplay's Music of the Spheres World Tour in November. At the 74th NHK Kōhaku Uta Gassen, the duo debuted the televised performance of "Idol" in Japan, featuring selected members of the participating Japanese and Korean idol groups—Seventeen, Nogizaka46, NiziU, Be:First, NewJeans, JO1, Stray Kids, Sakurazaka46, Le Sserafim, and MiSaMo— Ano, Kanna Hashimoto, Avantgardey, and Real Akiba Boyz. The show was considered the event's biggest draw, especially online.

Yoasobi is continuing touring concerts in both Japan and overseas, such as the 2023–2024 Asia tour, 2024 US tour, Pop Out Zepp Tour, Chō-genjitsu Dome Live and Asia tour, Wandara Hall Tour, Never Ending Stories Tour, and Super Planet Tour; the Chō-genjitsu Dome Live received 170,000 audiences. The duo also participated in numerous music festivals, including Clockenflap, Coachella, Lollapalooza, Summer Sonic Festival, etc. They made a guest appearance on NewJeans's Bunnies Camp 2024 at Tokyo Dome. In 2025, the duo travelled to Europe for Primavera Sound in Spain and a one-off concert in England, and opened for Billie Eilish's Hit Me Hard and Soft: The Tour for the Saitama show.

== Concert tours ==
Title	Date(s)	Associated album(s)	Location	Shows	Setlist	Attendance	Ref.
Denkōsekka Arena Tour	April 5 – June 24, 2023	—N/a	Japan	14	Setlist: 1. "Kaibutsu" (day 1) / "Shukufuku" (day 2); 2. "Yoru ni Kakeru"; 3. "Sangenshoku"; 4. "Seventeen"; 5. "Mr."; 6. "Umi no Manimani"; 7. "Suki da" 8. "Encore" (day 1) / "Yasashii Suisei" (day 2); 9. "Moshi mo Inochi ga Egaketara"; 10. "Tabun"; 11. "Taishō Roman" (day 1) / "Halzion" (day 2); 12. "Mō Sukoshi Dake" (day 1) / "Haruka" (day 2); 13. "Loveletter" (day 1) / "Tsubame" (day 2); 14. "Shukufuku" (day 1) / "Kaibutsu" (day 2); 15. "Gunjō"; 16. "Adventure"; 17. "Idol" (encore)	130,000	
Yoasobi Asia Tour 2023–2024	December 1, 2023 – January 21, 2024	The Book 3	Asia	8	Setlist: 1. "Yoru ni Kakeru"; 2. "Shukufuku"; 3. "Sangenshoku"; 4. "Seventeen"; 5. "Biri-Biri"; 6. "Mr."; 7. "Yasashii Suisei"; 8. "Yūsha"; 9. "Mō Sukoshi Dake"; 10. "Haruka"; 11. "Halzion"; 12. "Tabun"; 13. "Ano Yume o Nazotte"; 14. "Kaibutsu"; 15. "Gunjō"; 16. "Adventure"; 17. "Idol" (encore)	42,000 (Note: Cumulative attendees in Hong Kong, Taipei, Seoul, Singapore, Jakarta, and New Taipei)	
Pop Out Zepp Tour	January 25 – March 31, 2024	The Book 3	Japan	12	Setlist: 1. "Seventeen"; 2. "Shukufuku"; 3. "Sangenshoku"; 4. "Halzion"; 5. "Suki da" (day 1) / "Mr." (day 2); 6. "Tabun"; 7. "Biri-Biri"; 8. "Kaibutsu"; 9. "Moshi mo Inochi ga Egaketara"; 10. "Yasashii Suisei"; 11. "Tsubame"; 12. "Idol"; 13. "Yūsha"; 14. "Adventure"; 15. "Gunjō"; 16. "Heart Beat"; 17. "Yoru ni Kakeru" (encore)	25,000	
Yoasobi Live in the USA	April 18 – August 8, 2024	—N/a	United States	4	Setlist: 1. "Seventeen" (April) / "Undead" (August); 2. "Shukufuku"; 3. "Seventeen" (August); 4. "Halzion"; 5. "Suki da" 6. "Ano Yume o Nazotte" (April); 7. "Tabun"; 8. "Biri-Biri"; 9. "Mr."; 10. "Moshi mo Inochi ga Egaketara"; 11. "Yasashii Suisei"; 12. "Tsubame"; 13. "Idol"; 14. "Yūsha"; 15. "Kaibutsu"; 16. "Gunjō"; 17. "Heart Beat"; 18. "Yoru ni Kakeru" (encore)	16,000 (Note: Cumulative attendees for three shows in Los Angeles, San Francisco, and New York City)	
Chō-genjitsu Dome Live	October 26 – November 10, 2024	—N/a	Japan	4	Setlist: 1. "Seventeen"; 2. "Shukufuku"; 3. "Kaibutsu"; 4. "Undead"; 5. "Halzion"; 6. "Mr." (day 1) / "Suki da" (day 2); 7. "Mō Sukoshi Dake"; 8. "Umi no Manimani"; 9. "Yasashii Suisei"; 10. "Tabun"; 11. "Haruka"; 12. "New Me"; 13. "Yūsha"; 14. "Ano Yume o Nazotte"; 15. "Sangenshoku"; 16. "Monotone"; 17. "Encore"; 18. "Heart Beat"; 19. "Loveletter"; 20. "Adventure"; 21. "Tsubame"; 22. "Idol"; 23. "Gunjō"; 24. "Butai ni Tatte" (encore); 25. "Yoru ni Kakeru" (encore)	170,000	
Chō-genjitsu Asia Tour	December 7, 2024 – February 27, 2025	—N/a	Asia	14	Setlist: 1. "Seventeen"; 2. "Shukufuku"; 3. "Undead"; 4. "Halzion"; 5. "Mr." (day 1) / "Suki da" (day 2); 6. "Mō Sukoshi Dake"; 7. "Tabun"; 8. "New Me"; 9. "Monotone"; 10. "Yasashii Suisei"; 11. "Kaibutsu"; 12. "Yūsha"; 13. "Ano Yume o Nazotte"; 14. "Idol"; 15. "Heart Beat"; 16. "Gunjō"; 17. "Butai ni Tatte" (encore); 18. "Yoru ni Kakeru" (encore)	140,000	
Wandara Hall Tour	July 13 – November 30, 2025	—N/a	Japan	40	Setlist: 1. "Idol"; 2. "Shukufuku"; 3. "Undead"; 4. "Seventeen"; 5. "Yūsha"; 6. "Encore" (acoustic); 7. "Halzion" (acoustic); 8. "Tabun"; 9. "Mō Sukoshi Dake"; 10. "Watch Me!"; 11. "Tsubame"; 12. "Gunjō"; 13. "Kaibutsu"; 14. "Yoru ni Kakeru"; 15. "Players"; 16. "Adventure" (encore); 17. "Sangenshoku" (encore)	75,000	
Never Ending Stories Tour	July 31 – August 16, 2026	E-Side 4	North America	8	Setlist: 1. "Idol"; 2. "Shukufuku"; 3. "Undead"; 4. "Players"; 5. "Biri-Biri"; 6. "Watch Me!"; 7. "Baby"; 8. "Tabun"; 9. "Halzion"; 10. "Suki da" 11. "Yasashii Suisei"; 12. "Orion"; 13. "Yūsha"; 14. "Kaibutsu"; 15. "Seventeen"; 16. "Ano Yume o Nazotte"; 17. "Butai ni Tatte"; 18. "Gunjō"; 19. "Adrena" (encore); 20. "Yoru ni Kakeru" (encore)	70,000	
Super Planet Tour	October 24, 2026 – April 17, 2026	The Book For,	Asia, Oceania	18	Setlist: 1. "Shukufuku"; 2. "Undead"; 3. "Kaibutsu"; 4. "Taishō Roman"; 5. "Gekijō"; 6. "Killa"; 7. "Players"; 8. "Loveletter"; 9. "Yasashii Suisei"; 10. "Baby"; 11. "Encore"; 12. "Orion"; 13. "Yūsha"; 14. "Heart Beat"; 15. "Ano Yume o Nazotte"; 16. "Seventeen"; 17. "Idol"; 18. "Adventure"; 19. "Tsubame"; 20. "Sakihokore"; 21. "Watch Me!" (encore); 22. "Gunjō" (encore); 23. "Killa" (encore); 24. "Yoru ni Kakeru" (encore)	TBA	

== One-off concerts ==
Title	Date(s)	Associated album(s)	Location	Venue	Setlist	Attendance	Ref.
Keep Out Theater	February 14, 2021	The Book	Worldwide	Construction site of former Shinjuku Milano-za	Setlist: 1. "Ano Yume o Nazotte"; 2. "Halzion"; 3. "Tabun"; 4. "Haruka"; 5. "Kaibutsu"; 6. "Encore"; 7. "Yoru ni Kakeru"; 8. "Gunjō"	40,000 (online)	
Sing Your World	July 4, 2021	—N/a	Worldwide	Uniqlo City Tokyo	Setlist: 1. "Sangenshoku"; 2. "Halzion"; 3. "Mō Sukoshi Dake"; 4. "Tabun"; 5. "Kaibutsu"; 6. "Encore"; 7. "Yoru ni Kakeru"; 8. "Haruka" (with Osaka Tōin Senior High School Brass Band Club); 9. "Gunjō" (with Osaka Tōin Senior High School Brass Band Club)	280,000 (online)	
Nice to Meet You	December 4–5, 2021	The Book 2	Tokyo, Japan	Nippon Budokan	Setlist: 1. "Ano Yume o Nazotte"; 2. "Taishō Roman"; 3. "Halzion"; 4. "Sangenshoku"; 5. "Mō Sukoshi Dake"; 6. "Haruka"; 7. "Tabun"; 8. "Moshi mo Inochi ga Egaketara"; 9. "Yoru ni Kakeru"; 10. "Kaibutsu"; 11. "Yasashii Suisei"; 12. "Encore"; 13. "Tsubame"; 14. "Gunjō"; 15. "Loveletter" (encore)	14,000 (offline)	
Yoasobi TikTok Live	April 24, 2023	—N/a	Worldwide	Theater Milano-za	Setlist: 1. "Shukufuku"; 2. "Yoru ni Kakeru"; 3. "Seventeen"; 4. "Halzion"; 5. "Tabun"; 6. "Tsubame"; 7. "Kaibutsu"; 8. "Gunjō"; 9. "Adventure"; 10. "Idol"	630,000 (online)	
Yoasobi Live at Wembley Arena	June 8–9, 2025	—N/a	London, England	Wembley Arena	Setlist: 1. "Seventeen"; 2. "Shukufuku"; 3. "Undead"; 4. "Players"; 5. "New Me" (day 1) / "Suki da" (day 2); 6. "Halzion"; 7. "Watch Me!"; 8. "Tabun"; 9. "Monotone"; 10. "Yasashii Suisei"; 11. "Kaibutsu"; 12. "Yūsha"; 13. "Ano Yume o Nazotte"; 14. "Idol"; 15. "Heart Beat"; 16. "Gunjō"; 17. "Butai ni Tatte" (encore); 18. "Yoru ni Kakeru" (encore)	18,000	

== Festival appearances ==
Title	Date	Location	Performed song(s)	Ref.
Rock in Japan Festival 2022	August 6, 2022	Chiba, Japan	"Yoru ni Kakeru"; "Sangenshoku"; "Halzion"; "Taishō Roman"; "Mō Sukoshi Dake"; "Mr."; "Moshi mo Inochi ga Egaketara"; "Encore"; "Tsubame"; "Suki da"; "Kaibutsu"; "Loveletter"; "Gunjō"	
Rising Sun Rock Festival 2022	August 12, 2022	Ishikari, Japan	"Yoru ni Kakeru"; "Sangenshoku"; "Mō Sukoshi Dake"; "Mr."; "Encore"; "Tsubame"; "Suki da"; "Kaibutsu"; "Loveletter"; "Gunjō"	
Sweet Love Shower 2022	August 28, 2022	Minamitsuru, Japan	"Yoru ni Kakeru"; "Sangenshoku"; "Halzion"; "Taishō Roman"; "Encore"; "Kaibutsu"; "Tsubame"; "Gunjō"	
Head in the Clouds 2022	December 4, 2022	Jakarta, Indonesia	"Yoru ni Kakeru"; "Shukufuku"; "Mr."; "Tabun"; "Moshi mo Inochi ga Egaketara"; "Kaibutsu"; "Gunjō"; "Ano Yume o Nazotte"; Finale in Jakarta: "Into the Night"; "Monster" (with Warren Hue)	
Head in the Clouds 2022	December 9, 2022	Manila, Philippines	"Yoru ni Kakeru"; "Shukufuku"; "Mr."; "Tabun"; "Moshi mo Inochi ga Egaketara"; "Kaibutsu"; "Gunjō"; "Ano Yume o Nazotte"; Finale in Jakarta: "Into the Night"; "Monster" (with Warren Hue)	
Unibaru! Live 2023	March 11, 2023	Osaka, Japan	"Gunjō"; "Sangenshoku"; "Mō Sukoshi Dake"; "Loveletter"; "Shukufuku"; "Kaibutsu"; "Tsubame"; "Suki da"; "Haruka"; "Yoru ni Kakeru"; "Adventure"	
Head in the Clouds 2023	August 6, 2023	Pasadena, United States	"Shukufuku"; "Yoru ni Kakeru"; "Mr."; "Tabun"; "Moshi mo Inochi ga Egaketara"; "Kaibutsu"; "Gunjō"; "Idol"; Finale: "Kaibutsu" (with Warren Hue); "Idol" (with Atarashii Gakko!)	
Rock in Japan Festival 2023	August 13, 2023	Chiba, Japan	"Shukufuku"; "Yoru ni Kakeru"; "Sangenshoku"; "Seventeen"; "Mr."; "Tabun"; "Halzion"; "Tsubame"; "Kaibutsu"; "Gunjō"; "Adventure"; "Idol" (encore)	
Summer Sonic 2023	August 19, 2023	Chiba, Japan	"Yoru ni Kakeru"; "Shukufuku"; "Sangenshoku"; "Seventeen"; "Mr."; "Moshi mo Inochi ga Egaketara"; "Tabun"; "Halzion"; "Adventure"; "Tsubame"; "Kaibutsu"; "Gunjō"; "Idol"	
Summer Sonic 2023	August 20, 2023	Osaka, Japan	"Yoru ni Kakeru"; "Shukufuku"; "Sangenshoku"; "Seventeen"; "Mr."; "Moshi mo Inochi ga Egaketara"; "Tabun"; "Halzion"; "Adventure"; "Tsubame"; "Kaibutsu"; "Gunjō"; "Idol"	
Wild Bunch Fest. 2023	September 19, 2023	Yamaguchi, Japan	"Yoru ni Kakeru"; "Shukufuku"; "Sangenshoku"; "Seventeen"; "Mr."; "Tabun"; "Halzion"; "Adventure"; "Tsubame"; "Kaibutsu"; "Gunjō"; "Idol"; "Ano Yume o Nazotte" (encore)	
Nex_Fest 2023	November 3, 2023	Tokyo, Japan	"Yoru ni Kakeru"; "Shukufuku"; "Seventeen"; "Mr."; "Yūsha"; "Moshi mo Inochi ga Egaketara"; "Tabun"; "Kaibutsu"; "Gunjō"; "Idol"	
Full Power Fest 2023	November 4, 2023	Hiroshima, Japan	"Yoru ni Kakeru"; "Shukufuku"; "Sangenshoku"; "Seventeen"; "Yūsha"; "Tabun"; "Kaibutsu"; "Gunjō"; "Idol"	
Clockenflap 2023	December 1, 2023	Hong Kong, China	"Yoru ni Kakeru"; "Shukufuku"; "Sangenshoku"; "Seventeen"; "Mr."; "Biri-Biri"; "Yasashii Suisei"; "Tabun"; "Yūsha"; "Kaibutsu"; "Gunjō"; "Idol"	
2023 Simple Life Festival	December 3, 2023	Taipei, Taiwan	"Yoru ni Kakeru"; "Shukufuku"; "Sangenshoku"; "Seventeen"; "Mr."; "Biri-Biri"; "Yasashii Suisei"; "Tabun"; "Yūsha"; "Kaibutsu"; "Gunjō"; "Idol"	
Coachella 2024	April 12, 2024	Indio, United States	"Yoru ni Kakeru"; "Shukufuku"; "Seventeen"; "Biri-Biri"; "Tabun"; "Yūsha"; "Kaibutsu"; "Gunjō"; "Idol"	
Coachella 2024	April 14, 2024 (Note: As part of 88rising Futures)	Indio, United States	"Tabun"; "Idol" (with Atarashii Gakko!)	
Coachella 2024	April 19, 2024	Indio, United States	"Yoru ni Kakeru"; "Shukufuku"; "Biri-Biri"; "Tabun"; "Moshi mo Inochi ga Egaketara"; "Yūsha"; "Kaibutsu"; "Idol"	
Bubbling Boiling Music & Arts Festival	May 1, 2024	Tianjin, China	"Yoru ni Kakeru"; "Shukufuku"; "Seventeen"; "Biri-Biri"; "Mr."; "Tabun"; "Yasashii Suisei"; "Idol"; "Yūsha"; "Kaibutsu"; "Gunjō"	
Dream Future Kiloglow Music Festival	May 4, 2024	Hangzhou, China	"Yoru ni Kakeru"; "Shukufuku"; "Seventeen"; "Biri-Biri"; "Mr."; "Tabun"; "Yasashii Suisei"; "Idol"; "Yūsha"; "Kaibutsu"; "Gunjō"	
2024 Weverse Con Festival	June 15, 2024	Incheon, South Korea	"Yoru ni Kakeru"; "Kaibutsu"; "Tabun"; "Idol"	
Dead Pop Festival 2024	June 30, 2024	Kawasaki, Japan	"Yoru ni Kakeru"; "Shukufuku"; "Seventeen"; "Mr."; "Idol"; "Yūsha"; "Kaibutsu"; "Gunjō"	
Lollapalooza 2024	August 3, 2024	Chicago, United States	"Yoru ni Kakeru"; "Shukufuku"; "Seventeen"; "Mr."; "Biri-Biri"; "Suki da"; "Tabun"; "Moshi mo Inochi ga Egaketara"; "Yasashii Suisei"; "Yūsha"; "Idol"; "Kaibutsu"; "Gunjō"	
Summer Sonic Bangkok 2024	August 25, 2024	Pak Kret, Thailand	"Yoru ni Kakeru"; "Shukufuku"; "Seventeen"; "Biri-Biri"; "Tabun"; "Idol"; "Yūsha"; "Kaibutsu"; "Gunjō"	
Matsuri '25: Japanese Music Experience Los Angeles	March 16, 2025	Los Angeles, United States	"Seventeen"; "Shukufuku"; "Undead"; "Tabun"; "Yūsha"; "Kaibutsu"; "Yoru ni Kakeru"; "Gunjō"; "Idol"	
Central Music & Entertainment Festival 2025 (Note: As part of Echoes Baa stage)	April 5, 2025	Yokohama, Japan	"Idol"; "Yoru ni Kakeru"; "Undead"; "Mr."; "Players"; "Haruka"; "Halzion"; "Shukufuku"; "Kaibutsu"; "Gunjō"	
Central Music & Entertainment Festival 2025	April 6, 2025	Yokohama, Japan	"Idol"; "Yoru ni Kakeru"; "Undead"; "Seventeen"; "Players"; "Yasashii Suisei"; "Yūsha"; "Shukufuku"; "Kaibutsu"; "Ano Yume o Nazotte"; "Gunjō"	
Primavera Sound 2025	June 6, 2025	Barcelona, Spain	"Yoru ni Kakeru"; "Shukufuku"; "Undead"; "Seventeen"; "Players"; "Tabun"; "Yūsha"; "Gunjō"; "Kaibutsu"; "Idol"	
Zozofes	October 13, 2025	Yokohama, Japan	"The Noise" (Note: Featured only Ikura); "Idol"; "Shukufuku"; "Undead"; "Seventeen"; "Players"; "Yūsha"; "Gekijō"; "Kaibutsu"; "Gunjō"; "Yoru ni Kakeru"	
Pentatonic	January 24, 2026	Yokohama, Japan	"Idol"; "Shukufuku"; "Undead"; "Seventeen"; "Players"; "Adrena"; "Gunjō"; "Kaibutsu"; "Yoru ni Kakeru"	
Central Music & Entertainment Festival 2026	April 4, 2026	Yokohama, Japan	"Idol"; "Shukufuku"; "Undead"; "Seventeen"; "Players"; "Yūsha"; "Adrena"; "Kaibutsu"; "Gunjō"; "Yoru ni Kakeru"	
The Music Stadium 2026	April 5, 2026	Tokyo, Japan	"Idol"; "Shukufuku"; "Undead"; "Adrena"; "Players"; "Tabun"; "Yasashii Suisei"; "Yūsha"; "Seventeen"; "Kaibutsu"; "Ano Yume o Nazotte"; "Gunjō"; "Yoru ni Kakeru"; "Wherever You Are" (with One Ok Rock)	
Osheaga 2026	July 31, 2026	Montreal, Canada	"Idol"; "Shukufuku"; "Undead"; "Adrena"; "Tabun"; "Orion"; "Yūsha"; "Kaibutsu"; "Gunjō"; "Yoru ni Kakeru"	
Lollapalooza 2026	August 2, 2026	Chicago, United States	"Idol"; "Shukufuku"; "Undead"; "Adrena"; "Players"; "Tabun"; "Orion"; "Yūsha"; "Kaibutsu"; "Ano Yume o Nazotte"; "Gunjō"; "Yoru ni Kakeru"	

== Awards shows ==
Title	Date	City	Performed song(s)	Ref.
63rd Japan Record Awards	December 30, 2021	Tokyo, Japan	"Kaibutsu"; "Yasashii Suisei"; "Moshi mo Inochi ga Egaketara"	
65th Japan Record Awards	December 30, 2023	Tokyo, Japan	"Idol" (recorded at the Clockenflap 2023)	
8th Crunchyroll Anime Awards	March 2, 2024	Tokyo, Japan	"Idol"	
2024 Melon Music Awards	November 30, 2024	Incheon, South Korea	"Idol"; "New Me"	
2025 Music Awards Japan	May 22, 2025	Kyoto, Japan	"Players"	

== Television shows and specials ==
Title	Date	City	Performed song(s)	Ref.
71st NHK Kōhaku Uta Gassen	December 31, 2020	Tokorozawa, Japan	"Yoru ni Kakeru"	
CDTV Live! Live!	January 18, 2021	Tokyo, Japan	"Yoru ni Kakeru"; "Encore"	
Music Station	January 22, 2021	Tokyo, Japan	"Yoru ni Kakeru"	
Best Artist 2021	November 17, 2021	Tokyo, Japan	"Gunjō"	
2021 FNS Music Festival	December 1, 2021	Tokyo, Japan	"Mō Sukoshi Dake"	
Songs	December 2, 2021	Tokyo, Japan	"Loveletter"; "Taishō Roman"; "Tsubame" (with Midories)	
Music Station Ultra Super Live 2021	December 24, 2021	Tokyo, Japan	"Sangenshoku"	
72nd NHK Kōhaku Uta Gassen	December 31, 2021	Tokyo, Japan	"Gunjō"; "Tsubame" (with Midories) (Note: The show featured guest appearances from Nogizaka46, Bish, Hiromi Go, Masayuki Suzuki, Hiroshi Miyama, Haruna Kawaguchi, Yo Oizumi, Mayuko Wakuda, and mascots Ao and Kii.)	
Kimi no Koe ga Kikitai	May 6, 2022	Tokyo, Japan	"Sun" (with Gen Hoshino)	
CDTV Live! Live!	November 7, 2022	Yokohama, Japan	"Shukufuku"	
NHK Music Special Yoasobi: Shōsetsu o Ongaku ni Suru Mahō	May 11, 2023	Tokyo, Japan	"Mr."; "Suki da"; "Umi no Manimani"; "Seventeen"	
NHK Music Expo 2023	September 14, 2023	Tokyo, Japan	"Idol" (recorded at the Summer Sonic Festival 2023)	
M Countdown	September 21, 2023	Seoul, South Korea	"Idol"	
Sugo E Fes Live Broadcast Special	November 25, 2023	Tokyo, Japan	"Tsubame"	
CDTV Live! Live! Christmas SP	December 18, 2023	Osaka, Japan	"Adventure"	
Music Station Super Live 2023	December 22, 2023	Tokyo, Japan	"Biri-Biri"	
Yoasobi 18Fes	December 25, 2023	Tokyo, Japan	"Heart Beat"	
74th NHK Kōhaku Uta Gassen	December 31, 2023	Tokyo, Japan	"Idol" (Note: The show featured guest appearances from Avantgardey, Real Akiba Boyz, Seventeen (Hoshi, DK, Mingyu, and Seungkwan), Nogizaka46 (Minami Umezawa, Renka Iwamoto, Mizuki Yamashita, Haruka Kaki, Mayu Tamura, and Nao Yumiki), NiziU (Mako, Riku, Ayaka, Mayuka, and Miihi), Be:First (Sota, Leo, Junon, and Manato), NewJeans (Minji, Hanni, and Danielle), JO1 (Shosei Ohira, Syoya Kimata, Sukai Kinjo, Junki Kono, and Ruki Shiroiwa), Stray Kids (Felix, Seungmin, and I.N), Sakurazaka46 (Yui Kobayashi, Rina Matsuda, Yui Takemoto, Hikaru Morita, and Rena Moriya), Le Sserafim (Sakura, Kim Chaewon, Huh Yunjin, and Kazuha), MiSaMo, Ano, and Kanna Hashimoto.)	
With Music Haru no 2 Jikan Special	March 30, 2024	Tokyo, Japan	"Yūsha"	
The Show	December 3, 2024	Seoul, South Korea	"Idol"; "New Me"	
CDTV Live! Live!	June 29, 2026	Tokyo, Japan	"Idol"; "Shukufuku"; "Undead"; "Players"; "Gekijō"; "Yūsha"; "Orion"	
CDTV Live! Live!	July 6, 2026	Tokyo, Japan	"Adrena"; "Kaibutsu"; "Seventeen"; "Ano Yume o Nazotte"; "Gunjō"; "Yoru ni Kakeru"	
77th NHK Kōhaku Uta Gassen	December 31, 2026	Tokyo, Japan	TBA	

== Radio shows ==
Title	Date	City	Performed song(s)	Ref.
All of It with Alison Stewart	March 20, 2025	New York City, United States	"Yoru ni Kakeru"; "Tabun"; "Gunjō"	

== Other live performances ==
Title	Date	City	Performed song(s)	Ref.
The Home Take	May 15, 2020	Tokyo, Japan	"Yoru ni Kakeru"	
The First Take	February 26, 2021	Tokyo, Japan	"Gunjō"	
The First Take	March 10, 2021	Tokyo, Japan	"Yasashii Suisei"	
Music of the Spheres World Tour	November 6–7, 2023	Tokyo, Japan	"Yoru ni Kakeru"; "Shukufuku"; "Mr."; "Yūsha"; "Yasashii Suisei"; "Kaibutsu"; "Gunjō"; "Idol"	
Bunnies Camp 2024 Tokyo Dome	June 26, 2024	Tokyo, Japan	"Right Now" (with NewJeans); "Biri-Biri" (with NewJeans); "Idol"	
Hit Me Hard and Soft: The Tour	August 16, 2025	Saitama, Japan	"Yoru ni Kakeru"; "Kaibutsu"; "Tabun"; "Idol"	
Radwimps 20th Anniversary Live Tour	November 24, 2025	Yokohama, Japan	"Idol"; "Shukufuku"; "Undead"; "Seventeen"; "Players"; "Yūsha"; "Gekijō"; "Kaibutsu"; "Gunjō"; "Yoru ni Kakeru"; "Kaishin no Ichigeki"; "Sparkle" (encore; with Radwimps)	
BlizzCon 2026	September 13, 2026	Anaheim, United States	"Idol"; "Undead"; "Yoru ni Kakeru"; "Kaibutsu"; "Orion"	
Spotlight: Yoasobi	September 14, 2026	Los Angeles, United States	"Tabun"; "Yasashii Suisei"; "Orion"; "Idol"; "Yoru ni Kakeru"	
Spotted:	October 17, 2026	Sapporo, Japan	"Yoru ni Kakeru"; "Sakihokore"; "Ano Yume o Nazotte"	
Spotify on Stage Tokyo 2026: 10th Anniversary with Yoasobi	December 19, 2026	Tokyo, Japan	TBA	
