= Denkōsekka Arena Tour =

2023 concert tour by Yoasobi

- Tour by Yoasobi
- Promotional poster
- Location: Japan
- Start date: April 5, 2023
- End date: June 24, 2023
- Legs: 1
- No. of shows: 14
- Attendance: 130,000
- Website: yoasobi-music.jp/live/49695

Yoasobi concert chronology
- Nice to Meet You (2021); Denkōsekka Arena Tour (2023); Yoasobi Asia Tour (2023–2024)

The Denkōsekka Arena Tour (電光石火; means "fast as lightning"; officially titled Yoasobi Arena Tour "Denkōsekka") was the first concert tour by Japanese duo Yoasobi. The all-arena fourteen-show tour began on April 5, 2023, at Nagoya, Japan and concluded on June 24 in Yokohama. The shows received total 130,000 attendees.

== Background and marketing ==
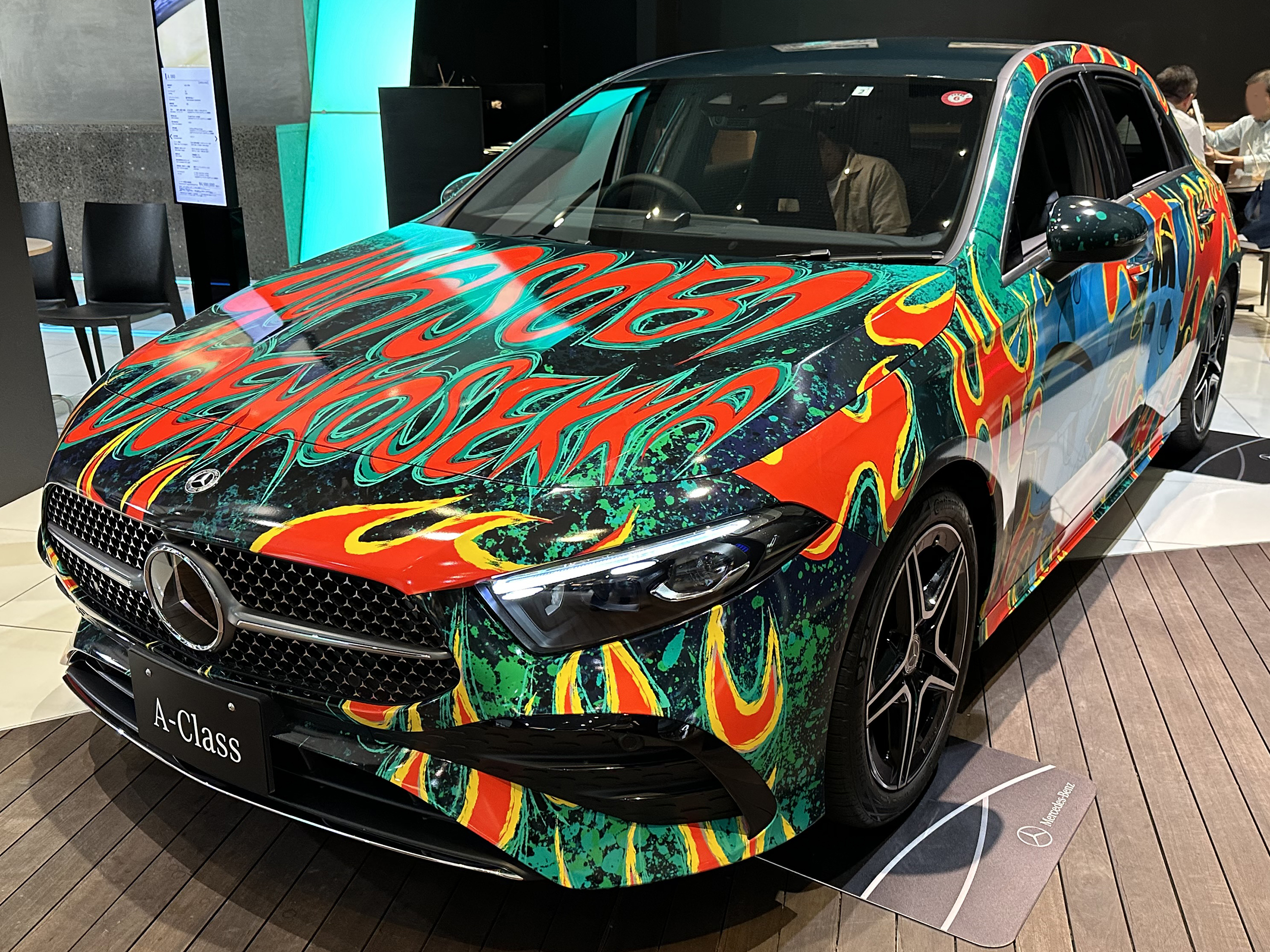
Mercedes-Benz A-Class wrapped with an original illustration drawn by Niina Ai (pictured).

Since the debut, Yoasobi previously held two livestream concerts in 2021–Keep Out Theater in February, and Sing Your World, a collaboration with Uniqlo, in July–and one face-to-face one-off concert Nice to Meet You in December, as well as several Japanese music festivals. On September 17, 2022, during the special episode of All Night Nippon Music Week hosted by the duo, Yoasobi announced that they would hold their first all-arena concert tour in 2023, initially titled "Yoasobi Arena Tour 2023", in six cities throughout Japan. The tour started on April 5 at Nippon Gaishi Hall, Nagoya, and originally concluded on June 4 at Saitama Super Arena, Saitama, with a total of twelve performances in two days at each venue. The official title "Denkōsekka" was announced on January 17, 2023, alongside the official promotional poster.

Tickets were pre-sold to the official fan club from September to November 2022, and the general public in November 2022 and January 2023. At the first show in Nagoya, Yoasobi announced two additional shows at Pia Arena MM, Yokohama on June 23–24. The tour's special exhibition was held from May 21 onwards at Shibu Hachi Box. The Saitama show on June 4 was broadcast as pay-per-view livestream via Lemino in Japan and Beyond Live elsewhere, while the June 3 show was broadcast via Wowow Prime and Wowow On Demand on July 8.

Mercedes-Benz Japan partnered with Yoasobi for a ticket lottery campaign and exhibiting Mercedes-Benz A-Class and B-Class wrapped with an original illustration drawn by Niina Ai, who works with Yoasobi's several music videos and cover artworks, including "Yoru ni Kakeru" and "Gunjō". The duo collaborated with Acecook to produce the new two special flavors with Denkōsekka-patterned lid for instant noodles brand Super Cup 1.5x to commemorate 35th anniversary of the brand. The product was sold at Saitama shows' venue exclusively before the official release on June 5. The concert at Saitama Super Arena was included on the duo's video album The Film 2, released on April 10, 2024.

== Reception ==
Billboard Japan's Tomonori Shiba praised the Saitama show about Yoasobi's "solid" performance, not a "kick-ass live act", as well as their "powerful stage that brought the entire arena together with their passionate vocals and whole-hearted performance." Music critic Akimasa Munakata dubbed Yoasobi at the Yokohama show as "J-pop pioneer", and the "cutting edge of 2023". Mie Sugiura from Rockin'On Japan described the second day of Saitama show as "a spectacular, overwhelming live performance". Denkōsekka Arena Tour amassed 130,000 attendees throughout 14 shows.

== Setlist ==
This set list is representative of the shows on June 23 and 24, 2023, in Yakohama. It is not intended to represent all shows.

1. "Kaibutsu" (day 1) / "Shukufuku" (day 2)
2. "Yoru ni Kakeru"
3. "Sangenshoku"
4. "Seventeen"
5. "Mr."
6. "Umi no Manimani"
7. "Suki da"
8. "Encore" (day 1) / "Yasashii Suisei" (day 2)
9. "Moshi mo Inochi ga Egaketara"
10. "Tabun"
11. "Taishō Roman" (day 1) / "Halzion" (day 2)
12. "Mō Sukoshi Dake" (day 1) / "Haruka" (day 2)
13. "Loveletter" (day 1) / "Tsubame" (day 2)
14. "Shukufuku" (day 1) / "Kaibutsu" (day 2)
15. "Gunjō"
16. "Adventure"

Encore

17. "Idol"

Notes

- During Nagoya shows, "Taishō Roman" / "Halzion" were originally placed between "Sangenshoku" and "Seventeen".

== Shows ==
List of concerts, showing date, city, country, venue and attendance
Date (2023)	City (Note: Labelled as each prefecture the city located showing in promotional material.)	Country	Venue	Attendance
April 5	Nagoya	Japan	Nippon Gaishi Hall	—
April 6	Nagoya	Japan	Nippon Gaishi Hall	—
April 8	Osaka	Japan	Osaka-jō Hall	—
April 9	Osaka	Japan	Osaka-jō Hall	—
April 15	Sapporo	Japan	Hokkai Kitayell	—
April 16	Sapporo	Japan	Hokkai Kitayell	—
May 4	Sendai	Japan	Xebio Arena Sendai	—
May 5	Sendai	Japan	Xebio Arena Sendai	—
May 21	Kitakyushu	Japan	West Japan General Exhibition Center	—
May 22	Kitakyushu	Japan	West Japan General Exhibition Center	—
June 3	Saitama	Japan	Saitama Super Arena	—
June 4 (Note: Streamed simultaneously on Lemino and Beyond Live.)	Saitama	Japan	Saitama Super Arena	—
June 23	Yokohama	Japan	Pia Arena MM	—
June 24	Yokohama	Japan	Pia Arena MM	—
Total				130,000

== Personnel ==
Yoasobi

- Ayase – keyboard, synthesizer, sampler
- Ikura – vocals

Band

- Zacro Misohagi – keyboard chorus
- AssH – guitar
- Honogumo – drums
- Hikaru Yamamoto – bass
