= The Film (video) =

2022 video album by Yoasobi

Video by Yoasobi
- Released: March 23, 2022
- Recorded: 2021
- Venue: Shinjuku Milano (Tokyo); Uniqlo City (Tokyo); Nippon Budokan (Tokyo)
- Length: 182:50
- Language: Japanese
- Label: Sony Japan
- Director: Masamichi Shimizu (T-S-ing)

Yoasobi video chronology
The Film (2022)	The Film 2 (2024)

The Film is the first video album by Japanese duo Yoasobi. It was released on March 23, 2022, through Sony Music Entertainment Japan, on Blu-ray exclusively. It consists of the duo's 2021 three concerts: Keep Out Theater, Sing Your World, and Nice to Meet You (day 2); and the enlarged version of their episode of documentary program Jōnetsu Tairiku, broadcast in December 2021. The Film debuted atop both the Oricon Blu-ray Disc Chart, and the Music DVD and Blu-ray Chart, selling 21,000 copies in its first week.

== Background and release ==
On January 26, 2022, Yoasobi announced to release the video album, titled The Film, on March 23. It contains two Blu-ray discs on bookbinder of the duo's three concert films–the first livestream concert, Keep Out Theater; the collaboration with Uniqlo's UT free livestream concert, Sing Your World; and the second day of their first in-person concert Nice to Meet You, as well as unreleased footage from for the Yoasobi episode of Jōnetsu Tairiku, a MBS TV documentary program which aired on December 12, 2021. It also included a photobook taken during the concerts.

To commemorate the release, the duo teased three concerts by four performances uploaded via YouTube: "Ano Yume o Nazotte" from Keep Out Theater on February 15, "Gunjō" from Sing Your World on March 1, and "Moshi mo Inochi ga Egaketara" and "Tsubame" from Nice to Meet You on March 8 and 23, respectively.

== Track listing ==
All tracks are written by Ayase.

Disc 1 – Yoasobi 1st Online Live "Keep Out Theater"
No.	Title	Length
1.	"Ano Yume o Nazotte"	4:26
2.	"Halzion"	3:23
3.	"Tabun"	4:22
4.	"Haruka"	4:13
5.	"Kaibutsu"	3:47
6.	"Encore"	4:36
7.	"Yoru ni Kakeru"	4:48
8.	"Gunjō"	4:08

Disc 1 – UT×Yoasobi Online Live "Sing Your World"
No.	Title	Length
9.	"Sangenshoku"	4:09
10.	"Halzion"	3:18
11.	"Mō Sukoshi Dake"	3:16
12.	"Tabun"	4:18
13.	"Kaibutsu"	4:09
14.	"Encore"	4:45
15.	"Yoru ni Kakeru"	4:25
16.	"Haruka" (with Osaka Tōin Senior High School brass band club)	4:02
17.	"Gunjō" (with Osaka Tōin Senior High School brass band club)	4:31
Total length:		70:36

Disc 2 – Yoasobi Live at Budokan "Nice to Meet You"
No.	Title	Length
1.	"Ano Yume o Nazotte"	4:36
2.	"Taishō Roman"	2:52
3.	"Halzion"	3:18
4.	"Sangenshoku"	4:34
5.	"Mō Sukoshi Dake"	4:39
6.	"Haruka"	4:10
7.	"Tabun"	4:24
8.	"Moshi mo Inochi ga Egaketara"	3:33
9.	"Yoru ni Kakeru"	4:24
10.	"Kaibutsu"	4:08
11.	"Yasashii Suisei"	3:43
12.	"Encore"	4:41
13.	"Tsubame"	3:53
14.	"Gunjō"	6:34
15.	"Loveletter" (encore)	3:49

Disc 2 – Jonetsu Tairiku
No.	Title	Length
16.	"Personal documentary program Jonetsu Tairiku" (MBS TV production / TBS nationwide television broadcast; enlarged version)	49:44
Total length:		112:14

Notes

- Track 1–8 of disc 1 is noted as "2021.2.14 Yoasobi 1st Online Live "Keep Out Theater" at Shinjuku Milano Former Site"
- Track 9–17 of disc 1 is noted as "2021.7.4 UT×Yoasobi Online Live "Sing Your World" at Uniqlo Ariake Headquarters / Uniqlo City Tokyo"
- Track 1–15 of disc 2 is noted as "2021.12.5 Yoasobi Live at Budokan "Nice to Meet You" at Nippon Budokan"

== Charts ==
Chart performance for The Film
Chart (2022)	Peak position
Japanese Blu-ray Disc (Oricon)	1
Japanese Music DVD and Blu-ray (Oricon)	1

== Sales ==
Sales for The Film
Region	Certification	Certified units/sales
Japan	—	20,456

== Release history ==
Release dates and formats for The Film
Region	Date	Format	Label	Ref.
Japan	March 23, 2022	Blu-ray	Sony Japan	
