= E-Side 2 =

EP by Yoasobi
- Released: November 18, 2022
- Genre: J-pop
- Length: 27:26
- Language: English
- Label: Sony Japan
- Producer: Ayase

Yoasobi chronology
The Book 2 (2021)	E-Side 2 (2022)	Hajimete no – EP (2023)

Singles from E-Side 2
- 1. "The Swallow" Released: November 4, 2022; 2. "The Blessing" Released: November 9, 2022

E-Side 2 is the second English-language EP and fourth overall by Japanese duo Yoasobi. It was released on November 18, 2022, through Sony Music Entertainment Japan. The EP consists of eight tracks from the duo's songs in the English language which are not included in their first English-language EP E-Side, preceded by two singles–"The Swallow", and "The Blessing"–released in the same month.

== Background and release ==
Yoasobi released their first English-language EP, titled E-Side, on November 12, 2021, containing eight tracks original in Japanese translated to English, preceded by four singles–"Into the Night" ("Yoru ni Kakeru"), "RGB" ("Sangenshoku"), "Monster" ("Kaibutsu"), and "Blue" ("Gunjō"). The EP peaked at number 19 on the Oricon Combined Albums Chart, and number nine on the Billboard Japan Hot Albums, earned 9,100 downloads as of January 2022.

On November 4, 2022, Yoasobi released the English version of Hirogare! Irotoridori's theme "Tsubame", titled "The Swallow". Five days later, "The Blessing", an English version of the Mobile Suit Gundam: The Witch from Mercury opening theme "Shukufuku", was issued. It was included on the CD single version of "Shukufuku". On the same day, the duo announced the second English-language EP, titled E-Side 2, scheduled for release on November 18 to digital music and streaming platforms, the same date as "Umi no Manimani", the third single from the duo's novel collection project Hajimete no. The snippet video called "crossfade movie" was revealed two days before the release.

== Commercial performance ==
E-Side 2 debuted at number 42 on the Oricon Combined Albums Chart, and number two on the Digital Albums Chart with 1,904 digital sales. For Billboard Japan, the EP entered the Hot Albums chart at number ten. It earned 1,489 downloads, peaking at number two on the component Download Albums, behind Lisa's album Lander.

== Track listing ==
All tracks are written by Ayase and translated to English by Konnie Aoki, except tracks 4, 6, and 7, which additionally included BFNK as a translator.

E-Side track listing
No.	Title	Length
1.	"The Blessing"	3:12
2.	"If I Could Draw Life"	3:22
3.	"Romance"	2:46
4.	"The Swallow" (featuring Midories)	3:37
5.	"Halzion"	3:18
6.	"Just a Little Step"	3:39
7.	"Haruka"	4:02
8.	"Love Letter"	3:30
Total length:		27:26

== Charts ==
=== Weekly charts ===
Weekly chart performance for E-Side 2
Chart (2022)	Peak position
Japanese Combined Albums (Oricon)	42
Japanese Hot Albums (Billboard Japan)	10

=== Year-end charts ===
Year-end chart performance for E-Side 2
Chart (2023)	Position
Japanese Download Albums (Billboard Japan)	60

== Sales ==
Sales figures for E-Side 2
Region	Certification	Certified units/sales
Japan Digital	—	5,274

== Release history ==
Release dates and formats for E-Side 2
Region	Date	Format	Label	Ref.
Various	November 18, 2022	Digital download; streaming	Sony Japan	
