= The Book 2 =

EP by Yoasobi
- Released: December 1, 2021
- Genre: J-pop
- Length: 27:29
- Language: Japanese
- Label: Sony Japan
- Producer: Ayase

Yoasobi chronology
E-Side (2021)	The Book 2 (2021)	E-Side 2 (2022)

Singles from The Book 2
- 1. "Kaibutsu" Released: January 6, 2021; 2. "Yasashii Suisei" Released: January 20, 2021; 3. "Mō Sukoshi Dake" Released: May 10, 2021; 4. "Sangenshoku" Released: July 2, 2021; 5. "Loveletter" Released: August 9, 2021; 6. "Taishō Roman" Released: September 15, 2021; 7. "Tsubame" Released: October 25, 2021

The Book 2 is the second Japanese-language EP (third overall) by Japanese duo Yoasobi. It was released on December 1, 2021, through Sony Music Entertainment Japan, eleven months after their debut EP The Book (2021). It consists of eight tracks, preceded by their all singles released in 2021, and included the new song "Moshi mo Inochi ga Egaketara".

In support of the EP, the duo held their first face-to-face concert Nice to Meet You on December 4–5 at Nippon Budokan. Commercially, The Book 2 debuted at number two on the Oricon Albums Chart, and atop Billboard Japan Hot Albums and certified gold by Recording Industry Association of Japan (RIAJ).

== Background and release ==
In 2021, Yoasobi released the debut EP The Book, preceded by the singles released from 2019 to 2020. It peaked at number two on both Oricon Albums Chart, and Billboard Japan Hot Albums, and atop the Oricon Digital Albums Chart for five consecutive weeks. According to Oricon, the EP sold over 200,000 units in Japan in the first half of 2021 and was certified gold for physical release and later downloads by Recording Industry Association of Japan (RIAJ).

On September 30, 2021, Yoasobi tweeted "IOOI / NOON" with the mysterious four images of the cartoonish vertical and horizontal rotating bookshelf. They show the colored cover books with the title "Yoasobi Story", the dates, and the word "noon", and the book spines with the duo's English song title, the latest livestream concert title Sing Your World, and the slogan "novel into music" among mostly plain and a few colored book spines. A day later, on the duo's second anniversary, they announced the second EP, titled The Book 2, alongside its track listing and cover artwork, scheduled for release on December 1. Pre-orders began on the same day of the announcement. The playlist of the EP and each song's based story in audio formats was published via Spotify on December 1.

In 2024, the vinyl format of The Book 2 was released elsewhere by Sony Music Germany and Black Screen Records in July 26, and in Japan with the different cover artwork illustrated by EIM (Junhwi Kang) on October 23.

== Promotion ==
On December 1, 2022, the same day as The Book 2 announcement, they also announced "Nice to Meet You Countdown" for the new announcement every Friday at noon (JST) for ten weeks until December 3, The second revealing was the release as standalone single of "Tsubame" on October 25, and the final announced the duo's appearance at the documentary program Jōnetsu Tairiku, broadcast on December 12. On November 23, Yoasobi released the EP's snippets "crossfade movie" and announced a phone call campaign as they did when promoting The Book. Fans can make a telephone call on November 23–30 for commentary of The Book 2's tracks daily. On the last day of the campaign, during their radio show, Yoasobi's All Night Nippon X, fans can call directly with the duo.

=== Live performances ===
Yoasobi appeared on Best Artist 2021, performing "Gunjō" for the first time via television on November 17. They debuted the televised performance of "Mō Sukoshi Dake" on December 1 at 2021 FNS Music Festival. The duo appeared on Songs the next day, and performed "Loveletter", "Taishō Roman", and "Tsubame" together with Midories for the first time. They performed "Sangenshoku" at the six-hour special edition of Music Station, titled Music Station Ultra Super Live 2021 on December 24. Yoasobi gave debut performances of "Kaibutsu", "Yasashii Suisei", and "Moshi mo Inochi ga Egaketara" on December 30 at the 63th Japan Record Awards, and participated the 72nd NHK Kōhaku Uta Gassen on the New Year's Eve to perform "Gunjō" and "Tsubame" with Midories.

=== Nice to Meet You ===
Yoasobi "Nice to Meet You"
- One-off concert by Yoasobi
- Location: Tokyo, Japan
- Venue: Nippon Budokan
- Associated album: The Book 2
- Date: December 4–5, 2021
- Duration: c. 110 minutes
- No. of shows: 2
- Attendance: 14,000 (offline)

Yoasobi concert chronology
- Sing Your World (2021); Nice to Meet You (2021); Denkōsekka Arena Tour (2023)

On October 1, 2021, the same day as the EP announcement, Yoasobi announced their one-off concert, titled Nice to Meet You in support of The Book 2. It was held from December 4 to 5 at Nippon Budokan, Tokyo, marking their first face-to-face concert since their debut in 2019. The performance of "Kaibutsu" from the first day of the concert was lived via YouTube as part of the virtual online music festival YouTube Music Weekend. In addition to in-venue, livestream was also available for the official fan club website Club Yoasobi via Stagecrowd.

The first-day show was re-run via Wowow streaming service on January 22, 2022. The footage of the concert was included on the duo's first video album The Film, released on March 23, which use the concert performances of "Moshi mo Inochi ga Egaketara" and "Tsubame" to promote the album. The duo uploaded three shows from the first day of the concert, which originally broadcast through Wowow, between July 26 to 28 at 17:00 JST, consisting of "Kaibutsu", "Yasashii Suisei", and "Gunjō".

==== Set list ====
This set list is representative of the show on both December 4 and 5, 2021.

1. "Ano Yume o Nazotte"
2. "Taishō Roman"
3. "Halzion"
4. "Sangenshoku"
5. "Mō Sukoshi Dake"
6. "Haruka"
7. "Tabun"
8. "Moshi mo Inochi ga Egaketara"
9. "Yoru ni Kakeru"
10. "Kaibutsu"
11. "Yasashii Suisei"
12. "Encore"
13. "Tsubame"
14. "Gunjō"

Encore

15. "Loveletter"

== Commercial performance ==
The Book 2 debuted at number two on both Oricon Albums Chart and Combined Albums Chart of December 13, 2021, selling 80,015 CDs in its first week, behind HKT48's Outstanding. It also peaked atop Digital Albums Chart, collecting 10,448 downloads, scored Yoasobi their third number-one digital albums of the chart, after The Book, and E-Side. For Billboard Japan, The Book 2 debuted at number one on the Hot Albums, making it the first number-one album of the chart. It opened with 83,585 CD copies (number two on the Top Albums Sales), and 8,717 download albums (number one on the Download Albums). The EP certified gold for physical release by RIAJ on January 14, 2022.

== Accolades ==
Awards and nominations for The Book 2
Ceremony	Year	Category	Result	Ref.
CD Shop Awards	2022	Grand Prix (Red)	Nominated	
CD Shop Awards	2022	Finalist Award	Won	
CD Shop Awards	2022	Special Award	Won	

== Track listing ==
All tracks are written by Ayase.

The Book 2 track listing
No.	Title	Length
1.	"Tsubame" (ツバメ; featuring Midories)	3:36
2.	"Sangenshoku" (三原色)	3:40
3.	"Taishō Roman" (大正浪漫)	2:46
4.	"Mō Sukoshi Dake" (もう少しだけ)	3:38
5.	"Yasashii Suisei" (優しい彗星)	3:33
6.	"Kaibutsu" (怪物)	3:25
7.	"Moshi mo Inochi ga Egaketara" (もしも命が描けたら)	3:21
8.	"Loveletter" (ラブレター)	3:30
Total length:		27:29

== Credits and personnel ==
- Ayase – songwriter, producer
- Ikura – vocals
- Midories – chorus (1)
- AssH – chorus (2), guitar (1–2, 4–6)
- Honogumo – chorus (2)
- Hikaru Yamamoto – chorus (2)
- Zaquro Misohagi – chorus (2)
- Nana Ototsuki – based story writer (1)
- Yūichirō Komikado – based story writer (2)
- Natsumi – based story writer (3)
- Chiharu – based story writer (4)
- Paru Itagaki – based story writer (5–6)
- Osamu Suzuki – based story writer (7)
- Takayuki Saitō – vocal recording
- Masahiko Fukui – mixing
- Hidekazu Sakai – mastering

== Charts ==
=== Weekly charts ===
Weekly chart performance for The Book 2
Chart (2021)	Peak position
Japanese Albums (Oricon)	2
Japanese Combined Albums (Oricon)	2
Japanese Hot Albums (Billboard Japan)	1

=== Monthly charts ===
Monthly chart performance for The Book 2
Chart (2021)	Position
Japanese Albums (Oricon)	3

=== Year-end charts ===
2021 year-end chart performance for The Book 2
Chart (2021)	Position
Japanese Albums (Oricon)	40

2022 year-end chart performance for The Book
Chart (2022)	Position
Japanese Albums (Oricon)	87
Japanese Digital Albums (Oricon)	3
Japanese Hot Albums (Billboard Japan)	11

2023 year-end chart performance for The Book 2
Chart (2023)	Position
Japanese Hot Albums (Billboard Japan)	82

2024 year-end chart performance for The Book 2
Chart (2024)	Position
Japanese Download Albums (Billboard Japan)	31

2025 year-end chart performance for The Book 2
Chart (2025)	Position
Japanese Download Albums (Billboard Japan)	78

== Certifications and sales ==
Certifications and sales figures for The Book 2
Region	Certification	Certified units/sales
Japan (RIAJ) Physical	Gold	133,974
Japan Digital	—	69,436

== Release history ==
Release dates and formats for The Book 2
Region	Date	Format	Label	Ref.
Various	December 1, 2021	Digital download; streaming	Sony Japan	
Japan	December 1, 2021	CD	Sony Japan	
Taiwan	October 20, 2023	CD	Sony Taiwan	
Various	July 26, 2024	Vinyl	Sony Germany; Black Screen	
Japan	October 23, 2024	Vinyl	Echoes; Sony Japan	
Various	December 2025	Vinyl	Sony Germany; Black Screen	

== See also ==
- List of Billboard Japan Hot Albums number ones of 2021
