= The Film =

The Film may refer to:

- The Film (film), 2005 Indian film
- The Film (video), 2022 video album by Japanese duo Yoasobi
- The Film (Sumac and Moor Mother album), 2025
