= Tsubame (song) =

2021 single by Yoasobi

Single by Yoasobi featuring Midories

from the EP The Book 2
- Language: Japanese
- English title: "The Swallow"
- Released: October 25, 2021
- Genre: J-pop
- Length: 3:37
- Label: Sony Japan
- Songwriter: Ayase
- Producer: Ayase

Yoasobi singles chronology
"Taishō Roman" (2021)	"Tsubame" (2021)	"Mr." (2022)

Music video
- "Tsubame" on YouTube "The Swallow" on YouTube

"Tsubame" (Japanese: ツバメ; lit. 'swallow') is a song by Japanese duo Yoasobi, featuring vocal group Midories, from their second EP, The Book 2 (2021). It was released as a single on October 25, 2021, by Sony Music Entertainment Japan. The song featured as a theme for SDGs children's television program series Hirogare! Irotoridori.

Written by Ayase and based on Nana Ototsuki's short story Chiisana Tsubame no Ōkina Yume, "Tsubame" expresses aspects and behavior of humans towards nature and sympathy for others from the perspective of a swallow. Commercially, the song debuted at number 19 on the Billboard Japan Hot 100 and number 29 on the Oricon Combined Singles Chart. The accompanying music video premiered on December 2.

== Background ==
On April 20, 2021, Yoasobi announced being in charge of performing a theme for Hirogare! Irotoridori, a television show series by NHK to introduce children about the Sustainable Development Goals (SDGs). The song would be written and based on the winner's original story from the project Yoasobi to Tsukuru Mirai no Uta, under the heading "living together". The winning story was announced on July 9, titled Chiisana Tsubame no Ōkina Yume (小さなツバメの大きな夢; lit. 'A Big Dream of a Small Swallow'), written by 15-year-old Nana Ototsuki, from a total of more than 700 works.

The title, "Tsubame", was revealed on September 28. Ayase explained about the song, "I wanted to make a song that brightens the message of what we can do about the perspective of swallows flying in the sky, the activities and problems of the people we can see from there, just by listening to it." The group formed by NHK, called Midories, was also announced on the same day, consists of five elementary school students from the first to the fifth grades—Atsuki, Ukyou, Lexie, Ririna, and Yumeri—to feature vocals of the song with Yoasobi. In addition, the song also featured as Minna no Uta's on-air song in October and November 2021.

== Release ==
On October 1, 2021, Yoasobi announced their second EP, The Book 2, which included their singles released that year, and added two tracks "Tsubame" and "Moshi mo Inochi ga Egaketara", a theme of the stage of the same name. It would be released on December 1, 2021. A week later, on October 8, the song was announced to release as a standalone single on October 25 to digital music and streaming platforms. The full song was first aired at the duo's radio show Yoasobi's All Night Nippon X on October 19 and played at several places in Japan before release, including Lawson, FamilyMart, Ministop, Matsuya, Sukiya, Shibuya Center Gai, and Takeshita Street. A cover artwork for "Tsubame" depicts a painting of a swallow flying toward the city in the distance, designed by Nina Ai, who also teamed up with "Yoru ni Kakeru", and "Gunjō". The English version, titled "The Swallow", was released on November 4, 2022, preceded the duo's second English-language EP E-Side 2, released on November 18.

== Lyrics and composition ==
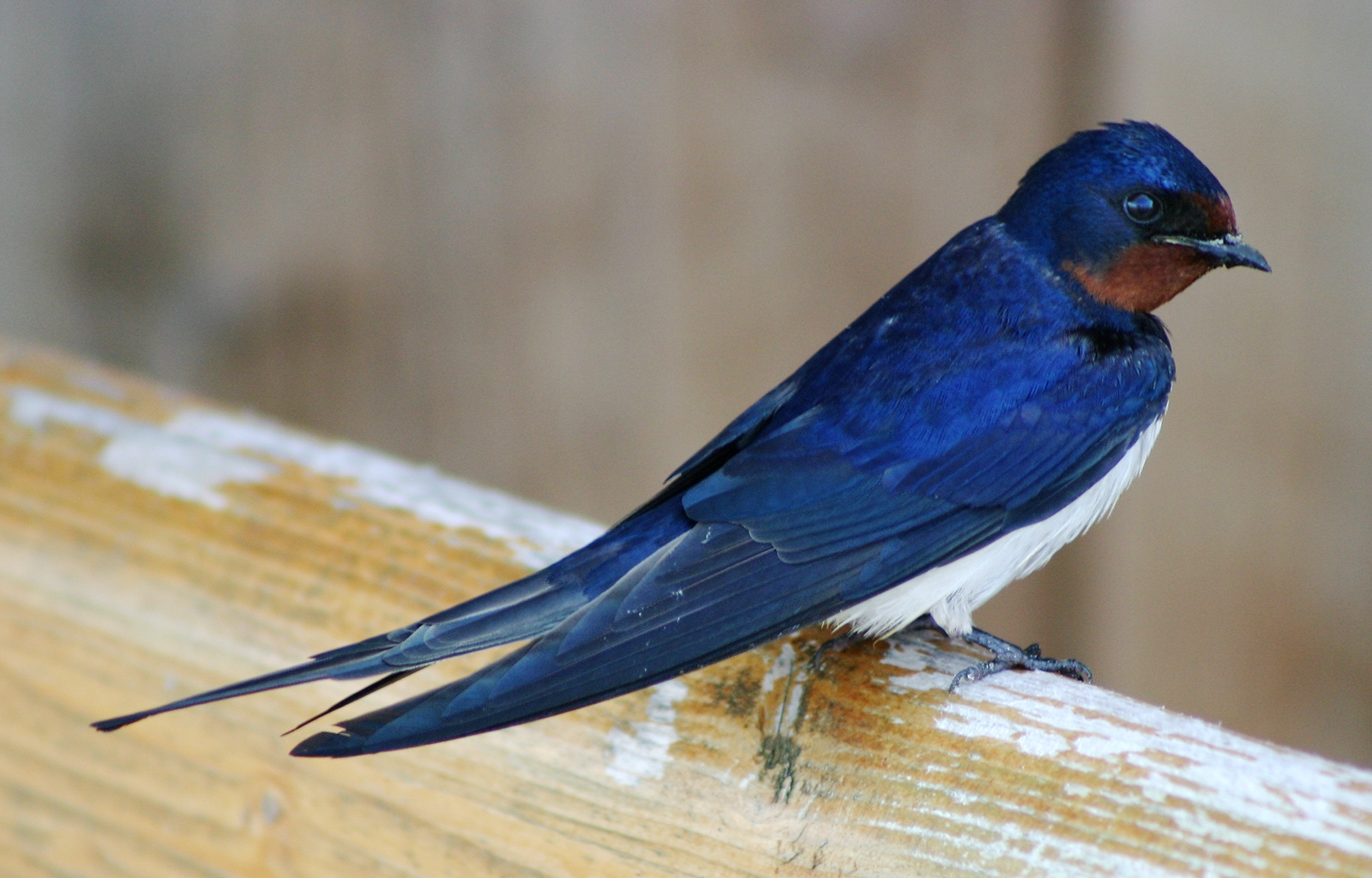
"Tsubame" means a swallow (pictured) in Japanese.

"Tsubame" was written by Ayase, a member and producer of Yoasobi, and recorded with the vocals of the duo Ikura, featuring the vocals of Midories. It was composed in the key of E♭ major, 105 beats per minute, with a running time of three minutes and 37 seconds. Lyrically, like the based story Chiisana Tsubame no Ōkina Yume, "Tsubame" tells from the perspective of a swallow as a protagonist, shows the tragedy of the sea it went through, positive and negative aspects and behavior of humans towards nature, sympathy for others, and ends up with a scene where swallows bring happiness to people. The song incorporates the idea that even small swallows can achieve big things if they cooperate, which leads to the efforts of the SDGs.

== Commercial performance ==
In Japan, "Tsubame" entered Billboard Japan Hot 100 at number 19, and also debuted at number three on the Download Songs with 13,355 download units, and number 77 on the Streaming Songs. The song landed on the Oricon Combined Singles Chart at number 29, and the Digital Singles Chart at number three, selling 15,660 units in its first week.

== Music video ==
An accompanying music video of "Tsubame" premiered on December 2, 2021, illustrated and directed by Nina Ai. The NHK E's children program Zawazawa'en no Ganpē-chan released their own version of the music video on October 21. The full version of the dance music video was uploaded on October 25, the same day as the single release on Hirogare! Irotoridori official website and NHK's official YouTube channel.

The music video for the English version "The Swallow" was uploaded on November 4, 2022, alongside the release. The "World version" music video premiered via NHK E's Aokiiro on November 7, featuring characters from Sesame Street and children from 23 countries supported by Japan International Cooperation Agency (JICA).

== Live performances ==
Midories and Hirogare! Irotoridori's mascots, Ao and Kii, performed the two-minute and twenty-second version of "Tsubame" for the first time on October 1 at Minna no Uta. Mikiko handled its choreography, shows flying hopefully to the future like a swallow, called "tsubame dance". Yoasobi gave a debut performance of "Tsubame" with Midories for the first time at music show Songs on December 2, 2021, alongside "Loveletter", and "Taishō Roman". The duo performed the song at the 72nd NHK Kōhaku Uta Gassen as part of Colorful Special Project on December 31, and Sugo E Fes Live Broadcast Special on November 25, 2023.

== Other versions ==
A cover of "Tsubame" by Japanese ska and jazz band Tokyo Ska Paradise Orchestra, featuring Midories, Neru Nagahama, and Tokyo Metropolitan Katakura High School brass band club, was released digitally on May 11, 2022, alongside the performance video, for the special edition Minna no Uta, Minna no Uta: Hirogare! Irotoridori, aired in May.

On July 4, 2022, the sole Midories version of "Tsubame" was released through digital music platforms, including on their studio album Tsubame to SDGs no Uta, collaborated with Ryūnosuke Kamiki and Fumi Nikaido, who voiced the Hirogare! Irotoridori's mascot Ao, and Kii, respectively. It was released on July 27.

== Track listing ==
- Digital download / streaming
1. "Tsubame" (ツバメ) – 3:37
- Digital download / streaming
1. "The Swallow" (English version) – 3:37

== Credits and personnel ==
- Ayase – songwriter, producer
- Ikura – vocals
- Midories – chorus
- AssH – guitar
- Nana Ototsuki – based story writer
- Takayuki Saitō – vocal recording
- Masahiko Fukui – mixing
- Hidekazu Sakai – mastering
- Nina Ai – cover artwork design, music video animation

== Charts ==
=== Weekly charts ===
Weekly chart performance for "Tsubame"
Chart (2021)	Peak position
Japan Combined Singles (Oricon)	29
Japan Hot 100 (Billboard)	19

=== Year-end charts ===
Year-end chart performance for "Tsubame"
Chart (2022)	Position
Japan Download Songs (Billboard Japan)	59

== Certifications ==
Certifications for "Tsubame"
Region	Certification	Certified units/sales
Japan (RIAJ) Digital	Gold	100,000^{*}
Streaming
Japan (RIAJ)	Platinum	100,000,000^{†}
^{†} Streaming-only figures based on certification alone.

== Release history ==
Release dates and formats for "Tsubame"
Region	Date	Format	Version	Label	Ref.
Various	October 25, 2021	Digital download; streaming	Original (Japanese)	Sony Japan	
Various	November 4, 2022	Digital download; streaming	English	Sony Japan	
