= Mō Sukoshi Dake =

2021 single by Yoasobi

Single by Yoasobi

from the EP The Book 2
- Language: Japanese
- English title: "Just a Little Step"
- Released: May 10, 2021
- Genre: J-pop
- Length: 3:40
- Label: Sony Japan
- Songwriter: Ayase
- Producer: Ayase

Yoasobi singles chronology
"Yasashii Suisei" (2021)	"Mō Sukoshi Dake" (2021)	"Sangenshoku" (2021)

Music video
- "Mō Sukoshi Dake" on YouTube "Just a Little Step" on YouTube

"Mō Sukoshi Dake" (Japanese: もう少しだけ; lit. "Just a Little More") is a song by Japanese duo Yoasobi from their second EP, The Book 2 (2021). It was released as a single on May 10, 2021, by Sony Music Entertainment Japan. Written by Ayase and based on Chiharu's short story Meguru, the song is a pop song, telling about giving the courage to take a little more at the beginning of a day. The song featured as a theme song for Fuji TV's morning news, Mezamashi TV.

Upon its release, the song received acclaim from music critics, who complimented its encouraging lyricism, comfortable, warm, and gentle feeling, as well as friendly and colorful vocals. An accompanying music video premiered on November 22, 2021. Commercially, the song debuted atop the Oricon Digital Singles Chart with 53,000 download units, and number four on both the Oricon Combined Singles Chart and Billboard Japan Hot 100, and was certified gold for downloads and two-time platinum for streaming by Recording Industry Association of Japan (RIAJ).

== Background and release ==
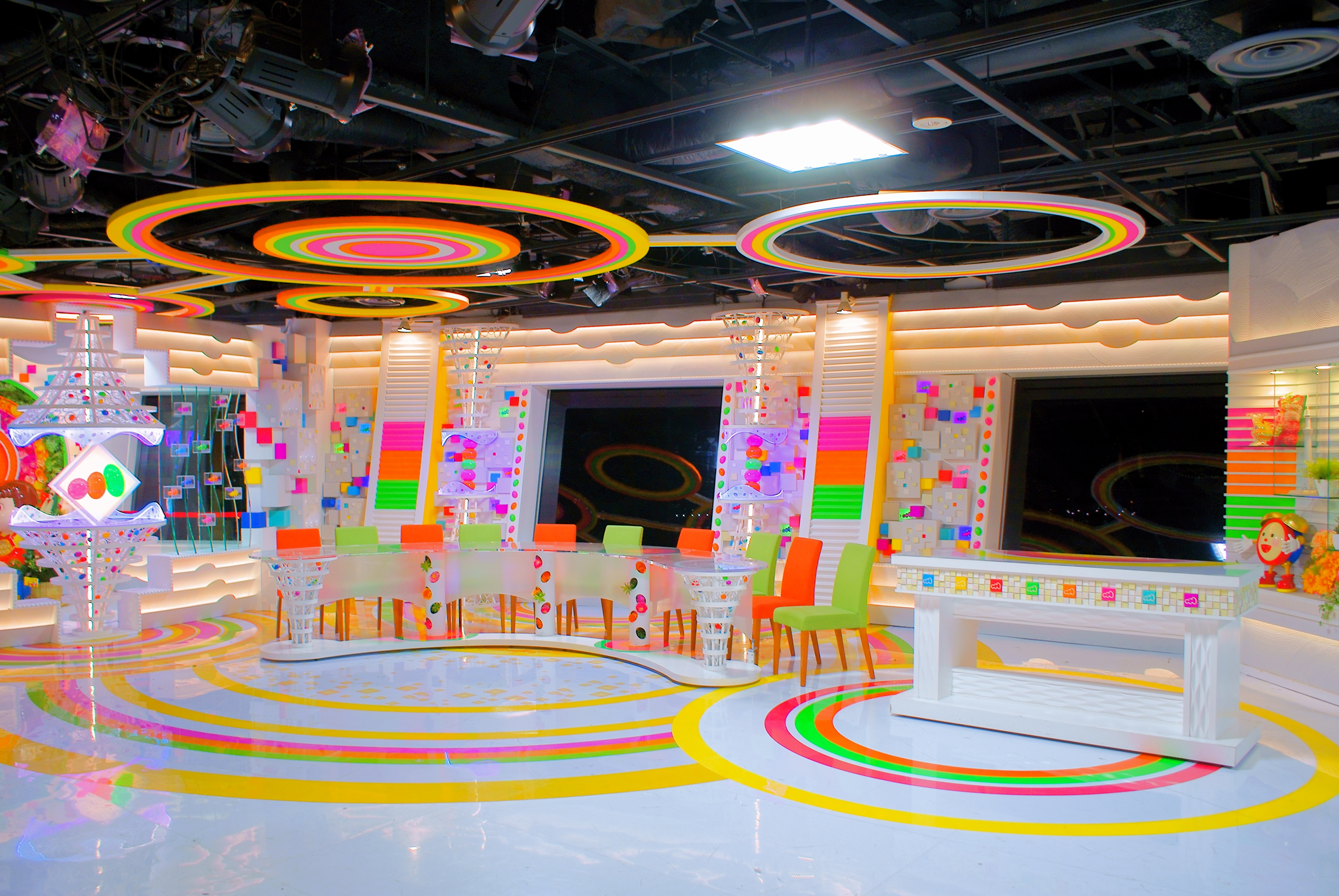
Mezamashi TV (studio in 2012) appointed "Mō Sukoshi Dake" as the theme song in April 2021.

On January 18, 2021, Yoasobi announced they would be in charge of performing a theme for morning news Mezamashi TV since April 2021. The new theme would be based on a short story which was chosen from contest Yoasobi Contest Vol.3 with Mezamashi TV held by Mezamashi TV and Sony Japan's creative writing social media, Monogatary.com. The selected story was announced on March 15, titled Meguru (めぐる。; lit. "It Will Come Around"), which was written by Chiharu, from a total of 5,605 short stories. It is about a chain of small happiness, starting from a slight happening that occurs in three characters: a salaryman, an elderly woman, and a high school girl, who saw the same fortune-telling in the morning.

The title of the song "Mō Sukoshi Dake" was announced on March 29, and used as a theme for the morning show for one year since the same day. The full song was first aired on May 4 on their radio show Yoasobi's All Night Nippon X and released officially on May 10 to digital music and streaming platforms. The cover artwork, designed by animation director and character creator Hmng, shows a world view of the short story and the music from the fortune-telling of the television screen, and the illustration cuts out the moment when the high school girl goes out, which appears in the based short story. "Mō Sukoshi Dake" was included on their second extended play The Book 2, released on December 1. The English version, titled "Just a Little Step", was appeared on the duo's second English-language EP E-Side 2, released on November 18, 2022.

== Lyrics and composition ==
"Mō Sukoshi Dake" is described as a refreshing light melody and light tempo piano pop song, written by Ayase, a member of the duo, and composed in the key of E♭ major, 100 beats per minute with a running time of 3 minutes and 40 seconds. The lyrics describe giving the courage to take just a little more at the beginning of each person's day. Yoasobi described "Mō Sukoshi Dake" as a song which can make a listener feel like a good day "whether it's a refreshing or gloomy morning".

== Critical reception ==
Rockin'On Japan's Miho Takahashi described "Mō Sukoshi Dake" as "matching the timing when you want to take a break", "the song is sung as if walking as usual and saying 'if you can step a little further' and 'may you find a little happiness'", and "Ikura's friendly and colorful voice matches the song and it makes comfortable feeling". Utaten's MarSali wrote that "the song expresses the message contained in Meguru along with the charm of music", and "the meaning of the lyrics will be deeper and more memorable if listen to the song after reading the short story". Salute Project stated that "the song made me warm and gentle" and "I want to be kinder and kinder to others by one step than now from tomorrow".

== Commercial performance ==
In Japan's Oricon weekly chart issue dated May 24, 2021, "Mō Sukoshi Dake" debuted at number one on the Digital Single Chart with 53,131 units, becoming the fifth number-one song on the chart and made Yoasobi becoming the third most number-one song artist on the chart history ("Yoru ni Kakeru", "Gunjō", "Kaibutsu", "Yasashii Suisei" and "Mō Sukoshi Dake"), along with Hikaru Utada, behind Kenshi Yonezu (7) and Bump of Chicken (6). The song debuted at number four on both the Combined Singles Chart and the Streaming Chart with 6,542,525 streams.

"Mō Sukoshi Dake" entered the Billboard Japan Hot 100 at number four dated May 19, 2021, behind Hey! Say! JUMP's "Negative Fighter", HKT48's "Kimi to Dokoka e Ikitai" and Twice's "Kura Kura", making the duo the best debuted-number song on the chart. The song also topped of the Download Songs chart with 45,931 units and debuted at number four on the Streaming Songs chart with 7,022,437 streams. On Billboard Global 200 and Global Excl. U.S charts of May 22, "Mō Sukoshi Dake" debuted at numbers 147 and 57, and peaked at number 103 and 38, respectively the next week. On November 29, 2023, the song received two-time platinum for exceeding 200 million streams from Recording Industry Association of Japan (RIAJ).

== Music video ==
An accompanying music video of "Mō Sukoshi Dake" premiered on November 22, 2021, at 8:00 AM (JST). Directed and with the animation made by Hmng, who also designed the cover artwork, the music video depicts a warm chain of kindness and compassion of people as the based story.

== Live performances and usage in media ==
Yoasobi performed "Mō Sukoshi Dake" for the first time at the free online concert collaborated with Uniqlo's T-shirt brand UT, Sing Your World via the duo's official YouTube channel on July 4, where the song was the number three. The duo gave a television debut performance of "Mō Sukoshi Dake" on December 1 at 2021 FNS Music Festival. Besides featuring Mezamashi TV, "Mō Sukoshi Dake" was also chosen as a theme for the drama produced by Mezamashi TV of the same name as the based story, titled Meguru, broadcast in December 2021.

== Credits and personnel ==
Song

- Ayase – producer, songwriter
- Ikura – vocals
- AssH – guitar
- Chiharu – based story writer
- Takayuki Saitō – vocal recording
- Masahiko Fukui – mixing
- Hidekazu Sakai – mastering
- Hmng – cover artwork design

Music video

- Hmng – director, animation
- Bivi – movie
- Minori Homura – assistant
- Shig – assistant

== Charts ==
=== Weekly charts ===
Weekly chart performance for "Mō Sukoshi Dake"
Chart (2021)	Peak position
Global 200 (Billboard)	103
Japan Combined Singles (Oricon)	4
Japan Hot 100 (Billboard)	4

=== Year-end charts ===
2021 year-end chart performance for "Mō Sukoshi Dake"
Chart (2021)	Position
Japan Hot 100 (Billboard)	48

2022 year-end chart performance for "Mō Sukoshi Dake"
Chart (2022)	Position
Japan Hot 100 (Billboard)	98

== Certifications ==
Certifications for "Mō Sukoshi Dake"
Region	Certification	Certified units/sales
Japan (RIAJ)	Gold	100,000^{*}
Streaming
Japan (RIAJ)	2× Platinum	200,000,000^{†}
^{*} Sales figures based on certification alone.^{†} Streaming-only figures based on certification alone.

== Release history ==
Release dates and formats for "Mō Sukoshi Dake"
Region	Date	Format	Label	Ref.
Various	May 10, 2021	Digital download; streaming	Sony Japan	
