= 72nd NHK Kōhaku Uta Gassen =

- Also known as: 72nd NHK Red & White Year-End Song Festival
- 第72回NHK紅白歌合戦: Colorful〜カラフル〜
- Genre: Music, Variety, Special
- Created by: Tsumoru Kondo
- Directed by: Yukinori Kida
- Presented by: Haruna Kawaguchi; Yo Oizumi; Mayuko Wakuda
- Starring: Shunichi Tokura
- Judges: Kasumi Ishikawa; Kaya Kiyohara; Eiko Koike; Kentaro Sakaguchi; Mami Tani; Kōki Mitani
- Ending theme: "Hotaru no Hikari"
- Composers: Takahiro Kaneko; Tsunaki Mihara
- Country of origin: Japan
- Original language: Japanese

Production
- Production location: Tokyo International Forum
- Running time: 265 minutes
- Production company: NHK Enterprise Inc.

Original release
- Network: NHK-G; NHK World Premium; TV Japan
- Release: December 31, 2021

The 72nd NHK Kōhaku Uta Gassen (第72回NHK紅白歌合戦; lit. 'The 72nd NHK Red & White Song Battle') was the 2021 (Reiwa 3) edition of NHK's television special Kōhaku Uta Gassen, held on December 31, 2021, live from the hall A of Tokyo International Forum (Tokyo, Japan), and broadcast in Japan through NHK General Television and NHK Radio 1, and worldwide through TV Japan (US only) and NHK World Premium. Yo Oizumi, Haruna Kawaguchi & Mayuko Wakuda served as show hosts. The Red Team won this event.

== About the show ==
This year's edition took place on Tokyo International Forum, since the usual venue, NHK Hall is currently undergoing renovations, to be done in time for the 73rd edition (2022). Starting this year, there will be no longer separate hosts for the Red and White team. Instead, the hosts will share duties with the general host, encouraging the performers, regardless of their gender. The theme for the 72nd edition is "Colorful", based on an idea of "I want to make the world as colorful as possible on the last night of 2021". The new logo for the show is also introduced: it is a gradient image that goes from red to white.

This was the first edition in two years to be held with an audience, with a certain number of spectators. After 50 appearances (the last being in 2020), Hiroshi Itsuki announced that he will not participate in this Kouhaku during a concert held on October 17.

Once again, Shunichi Tokura conducted the choir in the closing song "Hotaru no Hikari".

On December 25, Seiko Matsuda, who was scheduled to participate in the event, announced that she would withdraw from the event due to the sudden death of her daughter Sayaka Kanda.

On December 27, the performance order was revealed. LiSA and Hiromi Go will open the show, while Masaharu Fukuyama and MISIA (who makes her second consecutive Ootori) will repeat their closing acts from last year. Rehearsals took place from December 28 until the morning of the live show.

Due to copyright reasons, LiSA's performance from her song "Homura" could not be shown on the NHK World Premium broadcast (due to the use of scenes from the anime Demon Slayer), with only the artist's photo, in this case, LiSA, being shown.

== Artist lineup ==
Debuting artists Returning artists Special performances

Red Team				White Team			
Order	Artist	Appearance	Song	Order	Artist	Appearance	Song
First half
1	LiSA	3	"Akeboshi"	2	Hiromi Go	34	"2 Oku 4 Senman no Hitomi (Exotic Japan)"
4	NiziU	2	"Take a Picture"	3	Dish	1	"Neko"
6	Sakurazaka46	2	"Nagaredama"	5	Keisuke Yamauchi	7	"Yūrakuchō de Aimashō"
Colorful Special Segment: Nippon Zenkoku Ōmisoka no Yoru wa Colorful ni! Yoasobi, Midories and Ao to Kii – "Tsubame"
7	Awesome City Club	1	"Wasurena"	8	Generations from Exile Tribe	3	"Make Me Better"
9	Hinatazaka46	3	"Kimi Shika Katan"	10	Junretsu	4	"Kimi ga Soba ni Iru Kara"
12	Yoshimi Tendo	26	"Anta no Hanamichi" Brass Band SP	11	SixTones	2	"Mascara"
14	Mone Kamishiraishi	1	"Yoake o Kuchizusametara"	13	KAT-TUN	1	"Real Face" #2
16	Milet	2	"Fly High"	15	King & Prince	4	"Koi Furu Tsukiyo ni Kimi Omou"
18	Kaori Mizumori	19	"Ii Hi Tabidachi"	17	Mafumafu	1	"Inochi ni Kirawarete Iru"
				19	Snow Man	1	"D.D."
Ken Matsudaira – "Matsuken Samba II"
Second half
Colorful special segment: Asu e no yūki o kureru uta Tokyo Metropolitan Symphony Orchestra – "Overture" & "And To The Legend..." from Dragon Quest; LiSA – "Homura" from Demon Slayer: Kimetsu no Yaiba – The Movie: Mugen Train; Yoko Takahashi – "A Cruel Angel's Thesis" from Neon Genesis Evangelion
20	Ai	4	"Aldebaran"	21	Kanjani Eight	10	"Re:Live"
22	Bish	1	"Promise the Star"	23	Hiroshi Miyama	7	"Ukiyo Gasa" 5th Kendama Sekai Kiroku e no Michi
				24	Dai Hirai	1	"Stand By Me, Stand By You"
Ketsumeishi – "Life Is Beautiful"
25	Perfume	14	"Polygon Wave"				
26	Millennium Parade × Belle	1	"U"	27	Hiroji Miyamoto	2	"Yoake no Uta"
28	Nogizaka46	7	"Kikkake"				
Colorful special segment: Nippon zenkoku ōmisoka no yoru wa Colorful ni! Takashi Hosokawa – "Bōkyō Jonkara" and "Kita Sakaba"
29	Fuyumi Sakamoto	33	"Yozakura Oshichi"	30	Fujii Kaze	1	"Kirari" "Mo-Eh-Yo"
31	Yoasobi	2	"Gunjō"	32	Masayuki Suzuki	4	"Megumi no Hito" 2021 Kōhaku ver.
				33	Yuzu	12	"Niji"
35	Aimyon	3	"Till I Know What Love Is (I'm Never Gonna Die)"	34	Gen Hoshino	7	"Fushigi"
				36	Bump of Chicken	2	"Tentai Kansoku" "Nanairo"
Masashi Sada – "Dōkeshi no Sonnet"
37	Tokyo Jihen	2	"Ryokushu"				
38	Hiroko Yakushimaru	2	"Woman (W no Higeki) Yori"				
39	Sayuri Ishikawa	44	"Kaji to Kenka wa Edo no Hana" "Tsugaru Kaikyō Fuyugeshiki"	40	Kiyoshi Hikawa	22	"Uta wa Waga Inochi"
				41	Tomoyasu Hotei	1	"Saraba Seishun no Hikari" (Kouhaku SP)
43	Misia	6	"Ashita e"	42	Masaharu Fukuyama	14	"Michishirube"

Songs performed on medleys

- Tomoyasu Hotei: "Battle Without Honor or Humanity", "Sayonara Seishun no Hikari"
- MISIA: "Ashita e", "Higher Love"

Additional music

- "Ode to Joy" - Composed by Ludwig Van Beethoven
- "Next Episode" - Shiro Sagisu (from Neon Genesis Evangelion OST)
- "I Can't Help Falling in Love" - Performed by Hi-STANDARD (Original by Elvis Presley)
- "You've Got a Friend" - Performed by Carole King

=== Guest performers ===
- Midories
- Ryunosuke Kamiki - Aoi voice actor
- Fumi Nikaido - Ki voice actress
- Tokyo Metropolitan Symphony Orchestra - Dragon Quest music performers
- Takayuki Yamada - Dragon Quest VTR narrator
- Natsuki Hanae - Tanjiro Kamado voice actor
- Megumi Ogata - Shinji Ikari voice actress
- Megumi Hayashibara - Rei Ayanami voice actress
- Yuko Miyamura - Asuka Langley voice actress
- Kotono Mitsuishi - Misato Katsuragi voice actress
- Fumihiko Tachiki - Gendou Ikari voice actor
- Yoko Takahashi - Performer on "A Cruel Angel's Thesis"
- Kendama Chiba-chan, Kendama Heroes 2021, Taiyu Shoinji, Zuu Mandrake, DJ KOO, Fuku Suzuki, Mook - Kendama players on Hiroshi Miyama's performance
- Azuma - Flower artist on Yuzu's performance
- Fuu Hanataka - Hiroshi Miyama VTR narrator
- Kreva, Miyavi - Guest performers on Sayuri Ishikawa's performance
- Osaka Toin High School Symphonic Band - Guest musicians on Yoshimi Tendo's performance
- Nobuyoshi Kuwano, Yoshio Sato - Members from Rats & Star, guest vocalists on Masayuki Suzuki's performance
- Hayato Sumino - Piano on Mone Kamishiraishi's performance
- Hitori Gekidan - Reprising his role as a control booth technician from the 2020 Summer Olympics opening ceremony

== Voting system ==
This year, the 3-Point System was used again. One point is given from the six judges, another one from audience in TIF, and last one from the viewers. The team with at least 2 points is declared winner of the 72nd edition.

Results
Method	Votes		Points
Method	RED TEAM	WHITE TEAM	Points
Guest Judges	0	6	WHITE
T.I.F. Audience	1110	1000	RED
Viewers (Japan only)	2.189.150	1.956.996	RED
Winner	RED TEAM		
