= Sangenshoku =

2021 single by Yoasobi

Single by Yoasobi

from the EP The Book 2
- Language: Japanese
- English title: "RGB"
- Released: July 2, 2021
- Genre: J-pop
- Length: 3:44
- Label: Sony Japan
- Songwriter: Ayase
- Producer: Ayase

Yoasobi singles chronology
"Mō Sukoshi Dake" (2021)	"Sangenshoku" (2021)	"Loveletter" (2021)

Music video
- "Sangenshoku" on YouTube "RGB" on YouTube

"Sangenshoku" (Japanese: 三原色; lit. 'three primary colors') is a song by Japanese duo Yoasobi, from their second EP, The Book 2 (2021). It was released as a single on July 2, 2021, through Sony Music Entertainment Japan. The song featured as a background music for mobile service Ahamo advertisement. Based on Yūichirō Komikado's short story RGB, the song depicts relationships between childhood friends that are still connected even though they live in different places.

Commercially, the song debuted atop Oricon Digital Singles Chart with 57,000 download units, number three on the Combined Singles Chart, and number four on Billboard Japan Hot 100. The song also charted in the top 40 of Billboard Global 200 and the top 20 of Global Excl. U.S. The English version, titled "RGB", was released on July 16, 2021, and included on the duo's first English-language EP E-Side (2021).

== Background and release ==
Ahamo, a mobile service by NTT Docomo, released and started broadcasting a new advertisement starring Nana Mori and Fūju Kamio on February 24, 2021. It featured Yoasobi's song, titled "Sangenshoku". The song was based on a short story RGB, written by Gekidan No Meets scriptwriter Yūichirō Komikado. It is about three childhood friends who were estranged since elementary school due to a trivial matter and reunited as adults. The full version of the story was released on March 19, alongside a special interview with Yoasobi about the song via the special website for Ahamo and Yoasobi.

On June 14, cover artwork for "Sangenshoku" was revealed on the special website of the collaboration of Yoasobi and Uniqlo's T-shirt brand UT. On June 25, Yoasobi announced to release the song to digital music and streaming platforms on July, 2, the same day as "Into the Night", the English version of "Yoru ni Kakeru" and the standalone version of "Encore", and aired the full song on June 29 on their radio show Yoasobi's All Night Nippon X. The song was included on their second EP The Book 2, released on December 1.

On July 7, Yoasobi announced the English version of "Sangenshoku", titled "RGB", to be released on July 16, alongside its accompanying music video, and played for the first time on July 13 at their radio show Yoasobi's All Night Nippon X. It is the second English-language song after "Into the Night" and translated by Konnie Aoki. Later, the song was included on the duo's first English-language EP E-Side, released on November 12.

== Composition and lyrics ==
"Sangenshoku" is a pop song with Latin music influence, written by Ayase, a member of the duo, and composed in the key of F minor, 128 beats per minute with a running time of 3 minutes and 44 seconds. Lyrically, "Sangenshoku" expresses the reunion of childhood friends. Ayase put the message in the song, "In a world where you can't meet the people you want, the thread of relationships between people is still connected". The song also features the rapping part for the first time.

== Critical reception ==
Mikiki's Ryūtarō Amano has described "It is a great song that seems to be a condensed version of J-pop, Vocaloid culture, and J-rock, and the pop music of the era when hip-hop became the standard for the past 10 years". Utaten's MarSali wrote that "the song brings out the freshness of youth from the original which depicts changes in position and emotions and the beautiful friendship that does not change", and "it's a fresh song that expresses the expectation and cheerful mood when you meet your dear friends".

== Commercial performance ==
In Japan's Oricon weekly chart issue dated July 12, 2021, "Sangenshoku" debuted at number one on the Digital Single Chart with 56,910 download units with three day tracking, following "Mō Sukoshi Dake" that released on May, becoming Yoasobi's sixth number-one song and making Yoasobi the second most number-one song artist on the chart history ("Yoru ni Kakeru", "Gunjō", "Kaibutsu", "Yasashii Suisei", "Mō Sukoshi Dake", and "Sangenshoku"), alongside Bump of Chicken. The song also peaked at number three on both the Combined Singles Chart and Streaming Chart.

"Sangenshoku" debuted at number four on Billboard Japan Hot 100 for the chart issue date of July 7, 2021, behind BTS' "Butter", NEWS' "Burn", and Kenshi Yonezu's "Pale Blue". The song also peaked at number one on the Download Songs chart with 49,769 units and number 21 on the Streaming Songs chart with 3,802,915 streams. On Billboard Global 200 and Global Excl. U.S charts of July 17, "Sangenshoku" debuted at numbers 31 and 15, respectively.

== Music video ==
The short version of "Sangenshoku" music video, called Ahamo Special Movie, was uploaded on March 30, 2021, directed by Mado Matsumoto and illustrated by Jun Mutsuki. It shows a live-action and animation of the emotional changes until the three protagonists meet again, and the scenes of their memories are expressed in a fused and vivid image. An official music video premiered on July 3 and was handled by animation studio CloverWorks, depicting the world view of the short story RGB. The English version music video premiered on July 16, the same day with the English version song.

== Live performance ==
Yoasobi performed "Sangenshoku" for the first time at the free online concert collaborated with Uniqlo's T-shirt brand UT, Sing Your World via the duo's official YouTube channel on July 4, 2021, where the song was the number one. The duo will give the television debut performance of the song at the 6-hour special edition of TV Asahi's Music Station, titled Music Station Ultra Super Live 2021 on December 24.

== Track listing ==
- Digital download and streaming
1. "Sangenshoku" (三原色) – 3:44
- Digital download and streaming (English version)
1. "RGB" – 3:42

== Credits and personnel ==
Song

- Ayase – producer, songwriter
- Ikura – vocals
- AssH – guitar, chorus
- Honogumo – chorus
- Hikaru Yamamoto – chorus
- Zaquro Misohagi – chorus
- Yūichirō Komikado – based story writer
- Takayuki Saitō – vocal recording
- Masahiko Fukui – mixing
- Hidekazu Sakai – mastering
- Tata – cover artwork design

Ahamo Special Movie

- Sō Matsumoto – director
- Jun Mutsuki – illustrator

Music video

- Masashi Ishihama – storyboard, director, key animation
- Syōko Nakamura – character design, animation director, key animation
- Akihiro Sueta – key animation
- Kaori Itō – key animation
- Ryōsuke Nishii – key animation
- Keiko Nakaji – key animation
- Emiko Shimura – key animation
- Shinobu Mōri – key animation
- Aiko Komamoto – key animation
- Yumi Kobayashi – key animation
- Minami Seki – key animation
- Kazuaki Shimada – key animation
- Mikiko Ura – key animation, in-between animation checking, in-between animation
- Aiko Sonobe – key animation
- Yuki Akutagawa – key animation
- Yui Nakayama – in-between animation checking, in-between animation
- Hikari Imoto – in-between animation
- Rie Sukenaga – in-between animation
- Saori Noda – in-between animation
- Azusa Taniguchi – in-between animation
- Minami Nakamura – in-between animation
- EOTA – in-between animation
- Asuka Yokota – color scheme design, color style, color checking
- Yūko Watanabe – scanning, painting
- Akane Edagawa – scanning, painting
- Rumi Igarashi – scanning, painting
- Kōsuke Shimada – scanning, painting
- Kaoru Okuhara – scanning, painting
- Momoka Tsuji – scanning, painting
- Rina Iwabuchi – scanning, painting
- Miku Marikawa – scanning, painting
- Usui Hisayo – art director, background art
- Izumi Ozawa – background art
- Yayoi Okashima – background art
- Makiko Hirasawa – background art
- Boundary – 3D CGI
- Katsuaki Miyaji – CG works
- Miyuki Kumagai – CG works
- Minoru Tōya – CG works
- Shō Watanabe – CG production assistant
- Yūya Sukuma – compositing director, compositing
- Ruri Satō – compositing
- Sachiko Itō – compositing
- Kaito Ishizaka – compositing
- Natsu Ishioka – compositing
- Hirohisa Kitamura (Silver Link) – plug-in cooperation
- Nami Niinuma – editing
- Q-Tec – online editing
- Nobutaka Yoda (10Glauge) – CM editor
- Kenta Suzuki (Aniplex) – planning cooperation
- Yūichi Fukushima – animation producer
- Kōta Takano – production manager
- Honoka Katō – production setting production
- CloverWorks – animation production
- Akira Ushioda – translation co-operation

== Charts ==
=== Weekly charts ===
Weekly chart performance for "Sangenshoku"
Chart (2021)	Peak position
Global 200 (Billboard)	31
Japan Combined Singles (Oricon)	3
Japan Hot 100 (Billboard)	4

Weekly chart performance for "RGB"
Chart (2021)	Peak position
Japan Digital Singles (Oricon)	10

=== Year-end charts ===
2021 year-end chart performance for "Sangenshoku"
Chart (2021)	Position
Japan Hot 100 (Billboard)	45

2022 year-end chart performance for "Sangenshoku"
Chart (2022)	Position
Japan Hot 100 (Billboard)	58

== Certifications ==
Certifications for "Sangenshoku"
Region	Certification	Certified units/sales
Japan (RIAJ)	Gold	100,000^{*}
Streaming
Japan (RIAJ)	3× Platinum	300,000,000^{†}
^{*} Sales figures based on certification alone.^{†} Streaming-only figures based on certification alone.

== Release history ==
Release dates and formats for "Sangenshoku"
Region	Date	Format	Version	Label	Ref.
Various	July 2, 2021	Digital download; streaming	Original (Japanese)	Sony Japan	
Various	July 16, 2021	Digital download; streaming	English ("RGB")	Sony Japan	
