= Loveletter (Yoasobi song) =

2021 single by Yoasobi

Single by Yoasobi

from the EP The Book 2
- Language: Japanese
- Released: August 9, 2021
- Genre: J-pop
- Length: 3:32
- Label: Sony Japan
- Songwriter: Ayase
- Producer: Ayase

Yoasobi singles chronology
"Sangenshoku" (2021)	"Loveletter" (2021)	"Taishō Roman" (2021)

Music video
- "Loveletter" on YouTube; English version on YouTube

"Loveletter" (Japanese: ラブレター, Hepburn: Raburetā) is a song by Japanese duo Yoasobi from their second EP, The Book 2 (2021). It was released as a single on August 9, 2021, through Sony Music Entertainment Japan. The song was written by Ayase and based on Hatsune's letter Ongaku-san e, which won the Letter Song Project, a collaboration with radio show Sunday's Post. "Loveletter" peaked at number three on the Oricon Combined Singles Chart, and number four on the Billboard Japan Hot 100.

== Background and release ==
On August 30, 2020, Sunday's Post, Tokyo FM's radio show owned by Japan Post Service, announced a collaborative contest with Yoasobi called Letter Song Project to perform a song based on a letter written by listener about thoughts or expectations under the theme "thank you". The winner was announced on July 25, 2021, as sixth-grade student Hatsune's letter, titled Ongaku-san e (音楽さんへ; lit. "To Music"), which spells out gratitude for music. The song, titled "Loveletter", was aired for the first time on the radio show on August 1, and released on August 9 to digital music and streaming platforms. Later, the song appeared on Yoasobi's second extended play The Book 2, released on December 1. The English version was included on the duo's second English-language EP E-Side 2, released on November 18, 2022.

== Composition and lyrics ==
"Loveletter" was written by Ayase, a member of the duo, and composed in the key of G major at 100 beats per minute with a running time of 3 minutes and 32 seconds. The song is described as a "magnificent" song that depicts a vivid spread of music and love with various feelings. "Loveletter" featured brass band club from Osaka Tōin Senior High School, who also co-starred in their online concert, Sing Your World.

== Commercial performance ==
In Japan, "Loveletter" debuted at number one on the Oricon Digital Single Chart dated of August 23, 2021 with 37,281 download units, becoming their seventh number-one song on the chart. The song also peaked at number three on the Combined Singles Chart, and number 18 on the Streaming Chart. For Billboard Japan Hot 100, "Loveletter" opened at number four, behind SixTones's "Mascara", BTS' "Butter" and "Permission to Dance". It also topped the Download Songs with 31,392 download units, and reached number 17 on Streaming Songs. "Loveletter" also peaked at number 96 on the Billboard Global Excl. US.

== Music video ==
An accompanying music video of "Loveletter" was initially set to premiere on August 24, 2021, but had been postponed to August 31 due to production reasons. Directed by Satoru Ohno from ThinkR, art directed by Banishment, and animation directed by Ryō Ishii, the music video depicts the various gratitude contained in the based letter spreading on the music with the vivid scene. The music video begins with a girl holding her letter showing her love in music. It continues as she walks through her school until she sees a heart that explodes into music staves as it flies across the sky, and she runs after it. It ends up with the girl's friends joining her, chasing after the music, and enjoying it together with musical instruments background.

== Live performance and usage in media ==
Yoasobi gave a debut performance of "Loveletter" on music show Songs on December 2, 2021, alongside "Taishō Roman", and "Tsubame". "Loveletter" featured in the 20th anniversary commercial of Puré, starring Marika Itō.

== Credits and personnel ==
Song

- Ayase – producer, songwriter
- Ikura – vocals
- Hatsune – based story writer
- Mikio Gōma – bass arrangement
- Osaka Tōin Senior High School's Brass Band Club – brass instrument
- Takashi Umeda – conductor
- Takayuki Saitō – vocal recording
- Masahiko Fukui – mixing
- Hidekazu Sakai – mastering
- Flat Studio – cover artwork design

Music video

- Satoru Ohno (ThinkR) – director
- Yumi Nakamura – character design, executive animation director, color scheme design
- Kaori Fukui – animation director
- Aoi Yamane – original animation director assistant
- Takahide Ejiri – original animation director assistant
- Yū Kaneshiro – original animation director assistant
- Fumio Matsumoto – key animation
- Yoshito Narimatsu – key animation
- Yū Fukuoka – key animation
- Naoko Hayashi – key animation
- Haruna Hashimoto – key animation
- Mitsutaka Echigo – key animation
- Tetsuya Yoshimoto – second key animation
- Kaichi Baba – second key animation
- Kashiwaten – second key animation
- Ryūnosuke Kamida – second key animation
- Seiko Terashima – second key animation
- Yoshi Kirishima – second key animation
- Celenecosmos – second key animation
- Porkky – second key animation
- Leandro Duarte – second key animation
- Masashi Makino – in-between animation
- Shenron – in-between animation, finishing
- FAI – in-between animation, finishing
- GK Sales – in-between animation, finishing
- Inō Akihiro – in-between animation checking
- Saori Murakoshi – color style, color checking
- Defer Co., Ltd. – checking assistant
  - Hajime Satō
  - Ayumi Nakahara
  - Yuki Tozawa
- Nodoka Kadowaki – production assistant
- Banishment (Flat Studio) – art director, 3D CGI
- Studio WHO – art production assistance
- Sachiko15 – art production assistance
- Anhelo – art production assistance
- Shūsaku Takayanagi – 3D CGI director, compositing director
- V-Sign – 3D CGI
- Acca Effe – compositing
- Emi Irisa – compositing
- Sanneku Animation Co., Ltd. – compositing
- Lucas Cisterne – compositing
- Toshihide Fujii – compositing
- Kiyotake Tamura – compositing
- Hironobu Nagasawa – compositing
- Tomoyuki Ishiyama – compositing
- Shin Kuribayashi (Silver Link.) – compositing assistant
- Konbu – compositing assistant
- Haruka Wakai – graphic design
- Shogo Saitō – production manager
- Matsumoto Kohei (ThinkR) – producer
- Ryō Ishii (Flat Studio) – animation producer

== Charts ==
=== Weekly charts ===
Weekly chart performance for "Loveletter"
Chart (2021)	Peak position
Global Excl. US (Billboard)	96
Japan Combined Singles (Oricon)	3
Japan Hot 100 (Billboard)	4

=== Year-end charts ===
Year-end chart performance for "Loveletter"
Chart (2021)	Position
Japan Download Songs (Billboard Japan)	56

== Certifications ==
Certifications for "Loveletter"
Region	Certification	Certified units/sales
Streaming
Japan (RIAJ)	Platinum	100,000,000^{†}
^{†} Streaming-only figures based on certification alone.

== Release history ==
Release dates and formats for "Loveletter"
Region	Date	Format	Label	Ref.
Various	August 9, 2021	Digital download; streaming	Sony Japan	
