= Moshi mo Inochi ga Egaketara =

2022 promotional single by Yoasobi

Promotional single by Yoasobi

from the EP The Book 2
- Language: Japanese
- English title: "If I Could Draw Life"
- Released: August 12, 2022
- Genre: J-pop
- Length: 3:21
- Label: Sony Japan
- Songwriter: Ayase
- Producer: Ayase

Music video
- "Moshi mo Inochi ga Egaketara" on YouTube "If I Could Draw Life" on YouTube

"Moshi mo Inochi ga Egaketara" (Japanese: もしも命が描けたら; lit. "If I could draw life") is a song by Japanese duo Yoasobi from their second EP, The Book 2. It was first released on December 1, 2021, by Sony Music Entertainment Japan, and later released as a standalone promotional single on August 12, 2022. Written by Ayase, the song featured as a theme song of the play of the same name, Moshi mo Inochi ga Egaketara, written by screenwriter Osamu Suzuki, and based on it.

== Background and promotion ==
On June 2, 2021, Yoasobi was announced to be in charge of writing and singing a theme song for the play Moshi mo Inochi ga Egaketara (もしも命が描けたら), starring Kei Tanaka, Mario Kuroba, and Hijiri Kojima. The play was written by Osamu Suzuki, a screenwriter who also wrote Tsuki Ōji, a based short story for the duo's song "Haruka". Performed on August 12–22 at Tokyo Metropolitan Theatre, the story depicts a man who draws a picture as the time of life gradually decreases in order to share it with someone. On October 1, the duo announced the play's theme would be included on their second EP The Book 2 as the second track, released on December 1.

The full-length version of "Moshi mo Inochi ga Egaketara" was played for the first time at Tokyo FM's Jump Up Melodies Top 20 on November 26. An accompanying music video of "Moshi mo Inochi ga Egaketara" was premiered on December 12, 2021, directed by Asami Kiyokawa, who also handled art direction of the play. Yoasobi gave a debut performance of "Moshi mo Inochi ga Egaketara" on December 30, 2021, at the 63rd Japan Record Awards, alongside "Kaibutsu", and "Yasashii Suisei". The standalone version of the song was surprisingly released on August 12, 2022, to commemorate the first anniversary of the play premiere. The English version of the song, titled "If I Could Draw Life", was included on the duo's second English-language EP E-Side 2, released on November 18, 2022.

== Commercial performance ==
In Japan, "Moshi mo Inochi ga Egaketara" debuted at number 45 on the Oricon Combined Singles Chart and peaked at number 37 the next week. It landed at number three on the Digital Singles Chart, selling 11,823 download units in its first week. The song entered Billboard Japan Hot 100 at number 32, collecting 10,084 downloads (number three on the Download Songs), and ranked number 66 on the Streaming Songs in its first week.

== Credits and personnel ==
- Ayase – writer, producer
- Ikura – vocals
- Osamu Suzuki – based story writer
- Takayuki Saitō – vocal recording
- Masahiko Fukui – mixing
- Hidekazu Sakai – mastering

== Charts ==
Chart performance for "Moshi mo Inochi ga Egaketara"
Chart (2021)	Peak position
Japan Combined Singles (Oricon)	37
Japan Hot 100 (Billboard)	32

== Certifications ==
Certifications for "Moshi mo Inochi ga Egaketara"
Region	Certification	Certified units/sales
Streaming
Japan (RIAJ)	Gold	50,000,000^{†}
^{†} Streaming-only figures based on certification alone.

== Release history ==
Release dates and formats for "Moshi mo Inochi ga Egaketara"
Region	Date	Format	Label	Ref.
Various	August 12, 2022	Digital download; streaming	Sony Japan	
