= Taishō Roman (song) =

2021 single by Yoasobi

Single by Yoasobi

from the EP The Book 2
- Language: Japanese
- English title: "Romance"
- Released: September 15, 2021
- Genre: J-pop
- Length: 2:48
- Label: Sony Japan
- Songwriter: Ayase
- Producer: Ayase

Yoasobi singles chronology
"Loveletter" (2021)	"Taishō Roman" (2021)	"Tsubame" (2021)

Music video
- "Taishō Roman" on YouTube "Romance" on YouTube

"Taishō Roman" (Japanese: 大正浪漫; alternatively titled "Romance") is a song by Japanese duo Yoasobi from their second EP, The Book 2 (2021). It was released as a single on September 15, 2021, by Sony Music Entertainment Japan. Written by Ayase, and based on Natsumi's novel Taishō Romance, the song is about a romance between two people who came from different periods that contact via pen pal. Commercially, the song peaked at number two on the Billboard Japan Hot 100, and number five on the Oricon Combined Singles Chart.

== Background and release ==
On July 20, 2020, Monogatary.com, a creative writing social media operated by Sony Music Entertainment Japan, announced Yoasobi Contest Vol.2, for selecting a story to publish as a book by Futabasha and perform a song by Yoasobi. A winning story was announced on October 30, titled Taishō Romance (大正ロマンス, Taishō Romansu), written by Natsumi, from the total of 2,086 novels. The story is about Tokito, a boy who lives in Reiwa era accidentally received a letter from Chiyoko, a girl from the Taishō era, who later became a pen pal and developed a romance.

On August 9, 2021, at YouTube live streaming, Online Live Viewing Event "Yoasobi Hanseikai", the duo announced to adapt the award-winning story Taishō Romance to produce a song, titled "Taishō Roman", with changing a word from "Romance" (ロマンス) in katakana to "Roman" (浪漫) in kanji instead of the original on September 15, and publish the book of the same new title on the following day, September 16. The song was teased and featured as a main theme of Yoasobi's exhibition, Semiconductors Create New Realities, as part of Sony Park Exhibition, which was held at Ginza Sony Park. "Taishō Roman" officially released on September 15. Later, the song was included on their second extended play The Book 2, released on December 1. The English version, titled "Romance", appeared on the duo's second English-language EP E-Side 2, released on November 18, 2022.

== Composition and lyrics ==
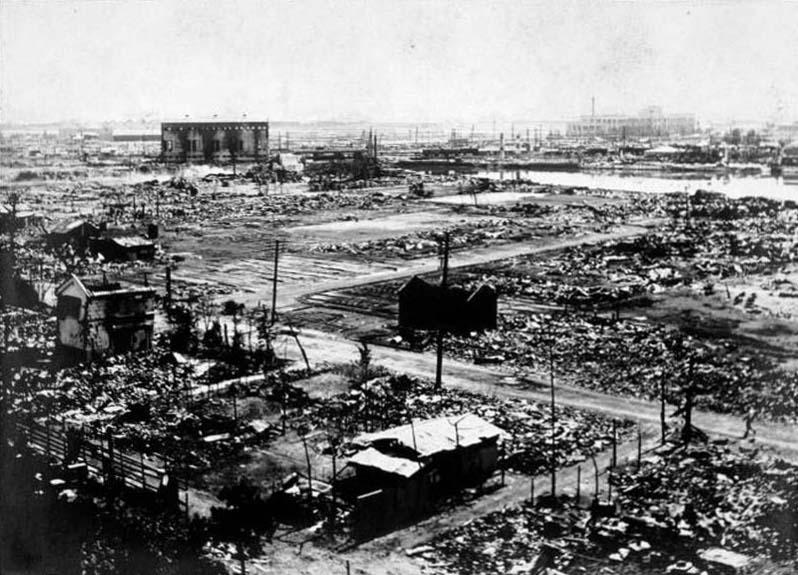
The lyrics of "Taishō Roman" are based upon an eponymous novel which references the 1923 Great Kantō earthquake of the Taishō era.

"Taishō Roman" was written by Ayase, a member, and producer of Yoasobi, and composed in the key of C♯ minor, 130 beats per minute with a running time of 2 minutes and 48 seconds. It is described as a "bittersweet" song with "hooked" piano sound. Valerie Valdez from The Honey Pop said the song is "produce[d] music that gives off the feeling of going through time."

Lyrically, like the based novel, "Taishō Roman" tells a time-lapse romance of two people who span over a hundred years. A boy in present Reiwa era accidentally received a letter written by a girl in Taishō era, 100 years ago. He fell in love with her and would like to meet her, but he could not because of the time difference. The boy learned that the girl was in a period of disaster (1923 Great Kantō earthquake) and wrote to warn her, but she did not reply after that. The girl's letter was sent to him later, described by the boy as "the last love letter". He regarded the letters as proof that girls are alive in her time and are determined to one day convey to her the experience of their own time.

== Commercial performance ==
In Japan's Oricon charts, "Taishō Roman" debuted at number 7 and later peaked at number 5 on the Combined Singles Chart. The song also debuted atop the Digital Singles Chart, earning 32,022 download units, becoming the eighth number-one song of the chart. For Billboard Japan, the song debuted at number two on the Japan Hot 100, behind only Kis-My-Ft2's "Fear", selling 28,042 download units (number one on the Download Songs), and with 4,045,151 steams (number 20 on the Streaming Songs) in first week. The song also entered number 105, and 42 on the Billboard Global 200, and Global Excl. US charts of October 2, respectively.

== Music video ==
An accompanying music video of "Taishō Roman" premiered on September 16, 2021. The duo released a teaser video of the song on September 13, showing Ikura's voice reading passages from the based novel Taishō Romance. For the music video, the characters were designed by Eisaku Kubonouchi, Shinji Kimura was the art director, and collaborated with NTT Docomo's project Quadratic Playground. The virtual reality music video, created by Quadratic Playground, was uploaded on October 26.

=== Synopsis ===
A scene in the music video shows Tokito seeing the giant clock pointing to 11:58, the time that the Great Kantō earthquake occurred.

The music video begins with a vivid background, showing Tokito, a boy who wears contemporary clothes, and Chiyoko, a girl who wears Taishō-era kimono, reading a letter with a showy background of kimono pattern, clocks, and household electric appliances flying past behind them. Then, they read it on the street in their era, Reiwa, and Taishō. The background is changed between a modern railway carriage switch and a wood-paneled railway carriage, shown they read a letter in the end.

After that, Tokito turns around to see the giant clock pointing to 11:58 in the background, which is the time that the Great Kantō earthquake occurred. Suddenly, he runs across the showy background and throws a letter into the door being close. Later, he walks crestfallenly, showing the black lyrics on white background. The door opened to show the letter is sent to Chiyoko. She read it and run to throw her reply letter sent to him. He reads the letter while standing on the hour hand of a clock and meet Chiyoko, which stands on the minute hand. Finally, the pair runs towards each other and embraces, but as quickly, the music video ended up with Chiyoko fading from an explosion of light.

== Live performance ==
Yoasobi performed "Taishō Roman" for the first time, alongside "Loveletter", and "Tsubame" at NHK's music show Songs on December 2, 2021.

== Credits and personnel ==
Song

- Ayase – producer, songwriter
- Ikura – vocals
- Natsumi – based story writer
- Takayuki Saitō – vocal recording
- Masahiko Fukui – mixing
- Hidekazu Sakai – mastering

Music video

- Yusuke Takase – director, storyboard, worldview design
- Eisaku Kubonouchi – character design
- Yasuhiro Nakura – key animation director, key animation
- Shinji Kimura – art director
- Yūki Hirakawa – worldview CG director
- Kohta Morie – character CG director
- Ryūsuke Suzuki – animation producer
- Toshihiko Sakata – CG producer
- Shaft – animation work
- Shin'ya Nishizawa – key animation
- Kumiko Kawashima – key animation
- Yūgo Ōhashi – key animation
- Riku Honda – key animation
- Yūri Ichinose – key animation
- Asami Ueno – 2nd key animation
- Yōichirō Ōtani – 2nd key animation
- Ryō Shimura – 2nd key animation
- Daniella Padilla Barquero – in-between animator
- Shino Yamada – in-between animator
- Jo Seien – in-between animator
- Xu Youzhen – in-between animator
- Momoka Uchida – in-between animator
- Sakura Funayama – in-between animator
- Yang Zhikai – in-between animator
- Yuna Tokudome – in-between animator
- Shintarō Kawakami – in-between animator
- Moemi Sakurai – in-between animator
- Yuka Mori – in-between animator
- Huang Minchun – in-between animator
- Tsuguhisa Furukawa – in-between animator
- Tomoko Murakami – in-between animator
- Miki Matsudo – in-between animator
- Rina Takenawa – in-between animator
- Kaho Katsuya – in-between animation inspection
- Yasuko Watanabe – color design, colorist, inspection
- Fumi Hattori – coloring/clean-up
- Yūko Kawakami – coloring/clean-up
- Onba Hayashi – coloring/clean-up
- Michiko Kado – coloring/clean-up
- Takayuki Aizu – compositing
- +Ring
  - Kenta Katsuno – worldview CG work
  - Ayaka Yamaguchi – worldview CG work
  - Tsukasa Iwaki – worldview CG work
  - Daiki Miura – worldview CG work
  - Akiho Yamada – worldview CG work
- Lipogram
  - Miyū Kimura – worldview CG work
  - Azuma Takuya – worldview CG work
  - Natsumi Katō – worldview CG work
- Modeling Bros
  - Shunsuke Imaizumi – worldview CG work
  - Yū Minoura – worldview CG work
  - Shunsuke Nakajō – worldview CG work
  - Kaede Kurodo – worldview CG work
  - Kaho Naruo – worldview CG work
- Freelance
  - Yasuhito Matsuura – worldview CG work
  - Satoshi Mitobe – worldview CG work
- Morie Inc.
  - Takehiro Shibano – character CG work
  - Naoto Tomita – character CG work
  - Marie Shirai – character CG work
  - Masato Tajima – character CG work
  - Katsura Kidera – character CG work
  - Kōetsu Ogawa – character CG work
  - Shin'ya Sugawara – character CG work
  - Ayūko Kitaoka – character CG work
  - Kento Sakai – character CG work
  - Ryō Tanbara – character CG work
  - Kōtarō Azuma – character CG work
  - Yōsuke Ōno – character CG work
- Hayato Kanayama (Transistor Studio) – character CG work
- Ken'ichi Sasaki – online editing
- Takumi Kudō – online editing
- Hatch Inc.
  - Ryōichirō Honma – producer
  - Seifu Kuroda – producer
  - Tatsuya Maekawa – producer
- Sadanori Maeda – text design
- Feng Hao – production manager
- Kiwa Harada – production manager
- Graphinica
  - Nao Hirasawa – animation work cooperation
  - Ōtsuka Miyū – animation work cooperation
- Ludens
  - Akatsuki Watabe – previs work
  - Natsumi Ogino – previs work
  - Akihiro Satō – previs work
  - Masashi Ueno – previs work
  - Ryō Shimizu – previs work
  - Satoshi Makita – previs work
  - Yoshiaki Ishigaya – previs work
- Ryōtarō Hidaka (Starbase Inc.) – creative director
- Hiroki Aonuma (Starbase Inc.) – creative producer
- Quadratic Playground by NTT Docomo, Inc. – production

== Charts ==
=== Weekly charts ===
Weekly chart performance for "Taishō Roman"
Chart (2021)	Peak position
Global 200 (Billboard)	105
Japan Combined Singles (Oricon)	5
Japan Hot 100 (Billboard)	2

=== Year-end charts ===
Year-end chart performance for "Taishō Roman"
Chart (2021)	Position
Japan Download Songs (Billboard Japan)	58

== Certifications ==
Certifications for "Taishō Roman"
Region	Certification	Certified units/sales
Streaming
Japan (RIAJ)	Platinum	100,000,000^{†}
^{†} Streaming-only figures based on certification alone.

== Release history ==
Release dates and formats for "Taishō Roman"
Region	Date	Format	Label	Ref.
Various	September 15, 2021	Digital download; streaming	Sony Japan	

== See also ==
- Taishō Roman
