= Kaibutsu =

2021 single by Yoasobi

Single by Yoasobi

from the EP The Book 2
- Language: Japanese
- English title: "Monster"
- A-side: "Yasashii Suisei"
- Released: January 6, 2021
- Genre: J-pop; anisong
- Length: 3:26
- Label: Sony Japan
- Songwriter: Ayase
- Producer: Ayase

Yoasobi singles chronology
"Haruka" (2020)	"Kaibutsu" (2021)	"Yasashii Suisei" (2021)

Alternative cover
- Limited double A-side single cover

Music video
- "Kaibutsu" on YouTube "Monster" on YouTube

"Kaibutsu" (Japanese: 怪物; lit. 'Monster') is a song by Japanese duo Yoasobi from their second EP, The Book 2 (2021). It was released as a single through Sony Music Entertainment Japan on January 6, 2021, the same date as the duo's debut EP, The Book. As an opening theme for the second season of the anime television series Beastars, "Kaibutsu" is about a carnivore trying to coexist with herbivores in a cruel world, based on Jibun no Mune ni Jibun no Mimi o Oshi Atete, written by the anime's writer Paru Itagaki.

Commercially, "Kaibutsu" peaked at number two on the Billboard Japan Hot 100, and number 87 on the Global 200. The double A-side CD single with "Yasashii Suisei", released on March 24, debuted at number two on the Oricon Singles Chart. The song earned four wins for both download and streaming categories of Song of the Year (Japan) and Best 5 Songs at the 36th Japan Gold Disc Award, and received diamond streaming certification from Recording Industry Association of Japan (RIAJ). It was featured on Time's 10 Best Songs of 2021 list, becoming the only Japanese song on it.

== Background and release ==
On November 5, 2020, it was announced that Yoasobi would perform the opening theme for the second season of the anime television series Beastars, titled "Kaibutsu". The TV-size version was previewed in the trailer released the same day. The song was based on the short story Jibun no Mune ni Jibun no Mimi o Oshi Atete (自分の胸に自分の耳を押し当てて; "I Press My Own Ear to My Chest"), written by Paru Itagaki, who also wrote and illustrated the manga.

"Kaibutsu" was released to digital music and streaming platforms January 6, 2021. The song was released as a double A-side CD single, together with "Yasashii Suisei" on March 24. The single came in 2 versions: limited edition (anime edition) and fan club limited edition for members of "Club Yoasobi", Yoasobi's official fan club website. Both versions included the original songs, TV-size version songs, and non-credit opening and ending video from Beastars. The fan club limited edition also included the acoustic session of "Tabun" and "Ano Yume o Nazotte". Later, the song was included on their second EP The Book 2, released on December 1.

Yoasobi announced the release of the English version of "Kaibutsu", titled "Monster", on July 30, alongside the accompanying music video, and aired the full song for the first time on their radio show Yoasobi's All Night Nippon X on July 27. It is the duo's third English song after "Into the Night, and "RGB". Later, the song was included on the duo's first English-language EP E-Side, released on November 12.

== Lyrics and composition ==
"Kaibutsu" is an upbeat fast-paced song with a catchy chorus, tells about a carnivore trying to coexist with herbivores in a cruel world. Although this idea is unrealistic, it still protects the herbivore. To adhere to its ideals, it decides to become strong and confront the whole world. The song is in the key of G♯ minor on the verses and break, E major on the first chorus, D♭ major on the bridge and in F major in the final chorus, and is at 170 beats per minute with a running time of 3 minutes and 26 seconds.

== Critical reception ==
American magazine Time ranked "Kaibutsu" number five on its list of the 10 Best Songs of 2021, becoming the only song from a Japanese act on the list, and being described as a "seamless" integration of "a giant pop hook with furious math rock riffs", "jazzy chromatic runs", and "a seismic EDM-esque drop". Additionally, critics said that the song gave "yearning", and "cinematic nature" and was "wholly unsurprised" to be served as the theme song to the anime Beastars.

== Commercial performance ==
"Kaibutsu" debuted at number 14 on the Billboard Japan Hot 100 of January 18, 2021 and peaked at number 2 on the chart of March 31, due to the CD single release. The song also peaked at number 87 on the Billboard Global 200 and number 39 on the Billboard Global Excl. US of January 30. "Kaibutsu" was certified diamond for streaming by Recording Industry Association of Japan (RIAJ) on December 26, 2023, surpassing 500 million streaming, the third song to do so after "Yoru ni Kakeru" and "Gunjō".

The CD single "Kaibutsu / Yasashii Suisei" debuted and peaked at number 2 on the Oricon Singles Chart for the chart issue date of April 5, 2021, selling 23,761 copies, and also number 2 on the Billboard Japan Top Single Sales chart, selling 27,275 copies for the chart issue date of March 31, 2021.

== Music video ==
The music video "Kaibutsu" was premiered on January 13, 2021, directed by Rina Mitsuzumi, with 2D animation by Kaori Onishi and motion graphics by Jun Matsuda and Cafuu. The music video depicts the conflict and determination of the main character, Legoshi, that wears a sense of speed and darkness. The music video surpassed 100 million views on June 22 and 200 million views on April 4, 2022.

== Live performance and cover ==
Yoasobi premiered the live performance "Kaibutsu" at their first online concert—Keep Out Theater on February 14, 2021, where the song was the fifth. The duo gave a television debut performance of the song at the 63rd Japan Record Awards on December 30, alongside "Yasashii Suisei", and "Moshi mo Inochi ga Egaketara".

On February 4, 2021, A cover of "Kaibutsu" by Japanese singer Masayuki Suzuki was released as a promotional single from his 35th anniversary cover greatest hit album Discover Japan DX, scheduled for release on February 23.

== Accolades ==
Awards and nominations for "Kaibutsu"
Ceremony	Year	Award	Result	Ref.
Crunchyroll Anime Awards	2022	Best Opening Sequence	Nominated	
Japan Gold Disc Award	2022	Song of the Year by Download (Japan)	Won	
Japan Gold Disc Award	2022	Best 5 Songs by Download	Won	
Japan Gold Disc Award	2022	Song of the Year by Streaming (Japan)	Won	
Japan Gold Disc Award	2022	Best 5 Songs by Streaming	Won	
Reiwa Anisong Awards	2021	Best Work Award	Nominated	
Reiwa Anisong Awards	2021	Best Artist Song Award	Won	

== Track listing ==
All tracks are written by Ayase.

Digital download and streaming
No.	Title	Length
1.	"Kaibutsu" (怪物)	3:26
Total length:		3:26

Digital download and streaming – English version
No.	Title	Length
1.	"Monster"	3:26
Total length:		3:26

CD single
No.	Title	Length
1.	"Kaibutsu"	3:26
2.	"Yasashii Suisei" (優しい彗星)	3:35
3.	"Kaibutsu" (TV Size version)	1:30
4.	"Yasashii Suisei" (TV Size version)	1:26
Total length:		9:58

DVD – limited edition
No.	Title	Director(s)	Length
1.	"TV Anime Beastars Season 2 Opening Non-Credit Video / Yoasobi 'Kaibutsu'" (TVアニメ「BEASTARS」 第2期オープニング ノンクレジット映像 / YOASOBI「怪物」)	Yamashita Toshiyuki	1:31
2.	"TV Anime Beastars Season 2 Ending Non-Credit Video / Yoasobi 'Yasashii Suisei'" (「TVアニメ「BEASTARS」 第2期エンディング ノンクレジット映像 / YOASOBI「優しい彗星」」)	Kōhei Kadowaki	1:31
Total length:			3:02

Blu-ray – fanclub limited edition
No.	Title	Director(s)	Length
1.	"TV Anime Beastars Season 2 Opening Non-Credit Video / Yoasobi 'Kaibutsu'"		1:31
2.	"TV Anime Beastars Season 2 Ending Non-Credit Video / Yoasobi 'Yasashii Suisei'"		1:31
3.	"Tabun" (acoustic session)	Jun'ichi Hirayama	5:02
4.	"Ano Yume o Nazotte" (acoustic session)	Hirayama	4:27
Total length:			12:31

== Credits and personnel ==
Song

- Ayase – producer, songwriter
- Ikura – vocals
- AssH – guitar
- Paru Itagaki – based story writer
- Takayuki Saitō – vocal recording
- Masahiko Fukui – mixing
- Hidekazu Sakai – mastering
- Kazuyoshi Saitō – cover artwork design

Music video

- Rina Mitsuzumi – director
- Jun Matsuda – motion graphics
- Cafuu – motion graphics
- Kaori Onishi – 2D animation
- AI Rinna – design supporter

== Charts ==
=== Weekly charts ===
Weekly chart performance for "Kaibutsu"
Chart (2021)	Peak position
Global 200 (Billboard)	87
Japan (Oricon) with "Yasashii Suisei"	2
Japan Combined Singles (Oricon) (with "Yasashii Suisei")	2
Japan Hot 100 (Billboard)	2
Japan Hot Animation (Billboard Japan)	1
US World Digital Song Sales (Billboard)	12

Weekly chart performance for "Monster"
Chart (2021)	Peak position
Japan Digital Singles (Oricon)	11

=== Monthly charts ===
Monthly chart performance for "Kaibutsu"
Chart (2021)	Position
Japan (Oricon) (with "Yasashii Suisei")	7

=== Year-end charts ===
2021 year-end chart performance for "Kaibutsu"
Chart (2021)	Position
Global 200 (Billboard)	141
Japan (Oricon) (with "Yasashii Suisei")	94
Japan Combined Singles (Oricon) (with "Yasashii Suisei")	2
Japan Hot 100 (Billboard)	5
Japan Hot Animation (Billboard Japan)	2

2022 year-end chart performance for "Kaibutsu"
Chart (2022)	Position
Japan Hot 100 (Billboard)	20
Japan Hot Animation (Billboard Japan)	7

2023 year-end chart performance for "Kaibutsu"
Chart (2023)	Position
Japan Hot 100 (Billboard)	51
Japan Hot Animation (Billboard Japan)	13

2024 year-end chart performance for "Kaibutsu"
Chart (2024)	Position
Japan Hot 100 (Billboard)	74

=== All-time charts ===
All-time chart performance for "Kaibutsu"
Chart (2008–2022)	Position
Japan Hot 100 (Billboard)	15

== Certifications ==
Certifications for "Kaibutsu"
Region	Certification	Certified units/sales
Japan (RIAJ)	Platinum	250,000^{*}
Streaming
Japan (RIAJ)	Diamond	500,000,000^{†}
^{*} Sales figures based on certification alone.^{†} Streaming-only figures based on certification alone.

== Release history ==
Release dates and formats for "Kaibutsu"
Region	Date	Format	Version	Label	Ref.
Various	January 6, 2021	Digital download; streaming	Original (Japanese)	Sony Japan	
Japan	March 24, 2021	CD+DVD; CD+Blu-ray	Limited; fanclub limited	Sony Japan	
Taiwan	May 28, 2021	CD+DVD	Limited	Sony Taiwan	
Various	July 30, 2021	Digital download; streaming	English ("Monster")	Sony Japan	
