= Yasashii Suisei =

2021 single by Yoasobi

Single by Yoasobi

from the EP The Book 2
- Language: Japanese
- English title: "Comet"
- A-side: "Kaibutsu"
- Released: January 20, 2021
- Genre: J-pop; anisong
- Length: 3:35
- Label: Sony Japan
- Songwriter: Ayase
- Producer: Ayase

Yoasobi singles chronology
"Kaibutsu" (2021)	"Yasashii Suisei" (2021)	"Mō Sukoshi Dake" (2021)

Alternative cover
- Limited double A-side single cover

Music video
- "Yasashii Suisei" on YouTube "Comet" on YouTube

"Yasashii Suisei" (Japanese: 優しい彗星; lit. 'Gentle Comet'; English title: "Comet") is a song by Japanese duo Yoasobi from their second EP, The Book 2 (2021). It was released as a single on January 20, 2021, by Sony Music Entertainment Japan, and released as a double A-side CD single together with "Kaibutsu" on March 24. The song was featured as an ending theme song for the second season of the anime television series Beastars.

== Background and release ==
Following the release of "Kaibutsu" in early January 2021, Yoasobi announced the ending theme for the second season of the anime television series Beastars, titled "Yasashii Suisei". The song was based on the short story Shishiza Ryūseigun no Mama ni (獅子座流星群のままに; "A Leonid, Always"), written by Paru Itagaki, who also wrote and illustrated the manga.

"Yasashii Suisei" was released digitally on January 20, 2021, and released as a double A-side CD single, together with "Kaibutsu" on March 24. The single was released with two versions: limited edition (anime edition) and fan club limited edition for members of "Club Yoasobi", Yoasobi's official fan club website. Both versions included the original songs, TV size version songs, and non-credit opening and ending videos from Beastars. The fan club limited edition also included the acoustic session of "Tabun" and "Ano Yume o Nazotte".

Later, "Yasashii Suisei" was included on their second extended play The Book 2, released on December 1. The English version of the song, titled "Comet" was included on the duo's first English-language EP E-Side, scheduled for release on November 12.

== Lyrics and composition ==
"Yasashii Suisei" is a ballad song with a straightforward message about two people from different backgrounds nurturing a beautiful friendship in a cruel world. The song is composed in the key of F major, 90 beats per minute with a running time of 3 minutes and 33 seconds.

== Commercial performance ==
"Yasashii Suisei" debuted at number 20 on the Billboard Japan Hot 100 of February 1, 2021 and peaked at number 19 on the chart of March 31, 2021, and also peaked at number 97 on the Billboard Global Excl. US of February 6.

The CD single "Kaibutsu / Yasashii Suisei" debuted and peaked at number 2 on the Oricon Singles Chart for the chart issue date of April 5, 2021, selling 23,761 copies, and also number 2 on the Billboard Japan Top Single Sales chart, selling 27,275 copies for the chart issue date of March 31, 2021.

== Music video ==
The music video "Yasashii Suisei" was premiered on March 25, 2021. It was directed and produced by Kōhei Kadowaki, who also produced the ending video for the anime Beastars. The music video focuses on the important characters of the anime, Louis and Ibuki, shows the ephemeral and gentle world view which flows between the two is delicate with over 2,500 illustrations drawn by director.

== Live performance ==
"Yasashii Suisei" was performed for the first time on the YouTube channel The First Take, which premiered on March 10, 2021. The duo gave a televised debut performance of the song at the 63rd Japan Record Awards on December 30, alongside "Kaibutsu", and "Moshi mo Inochi ga Egaketara".

== Accolades ==
Awards and nominations for "Yasashii Suisei"
Ceremony	Year	Award	Result	Ref.
Anime Trending Awards	2022	Ending Theme Song of the Year	Nominated	
Crunchyroll Anime Awards	2022	Best Ending Sequence	Nominated	

== Track listing ==
All tracks are written by Ayase.

Digital download and streaming
No.	Title	Length
1.	"Yasashii Suisei" (優しい彗星)	3:35
Total length:		3:35

CD single
No.	Title	Length
1.	"Kaibutsu" (怪物)	3:26
2.	"Yasashii Suisei"	3:35
3.	"Kaibutsu" (TV Size version)	1:30
4.	"Yasashii Suisei" (TV Size version)	1:26
Total length:		9:58

DVD – limited edition
No.	Title	Director(s)	Length
1.	"TV Anime Beastars Season 2 Opening Non-Credit Video / Yoasobi 'Kaibutsu'" (TVアニメ「BEASTARS」 第2期オープニング ノンクレジット映像 / YOASOBI「怪物」)	Yamashita Toshiyuki	1:31
2.	"TV Anime Beastars Season 2 Ending Non-Credit Video / Yoasobi 'Yasashii Suisei'" (「TVアニメ「BEASTARS」 第2期エンディング ノンクレジット映像 / YOASOBI「優しい彗星」」)	Kōhei Kadowaki	1:31
Total length:			3:02

Blu-ray – fanclub limited edition
No.	Title	Director(s)	Length
1.	"TV Anime Beastars Season 2 Opening Non-Credit Video / Yoasobi 'Kaibutsu'"		1:31
2.	"TV Anime Beastars Season 2 Ending Non-Credit Video / Yoasobi 'Yasashii Suisei'"		1:31
3.	"Tabun" (acoustic session)	Jun'ichi Hirayama	5:02
4.	"Ano Yume o Nazotte" (acoustic session)	Hirayama	4:27
Total length:			12:31

== Credits and personnel ==
Song

- Ayase – producer, songwriter
- Ikura – vocals
- AssH – guitar
- Paru Itagaki – based story writer
- Takayuki Saitō – vocal recording
- Masahiko Fukui – mixing
- Hidekazu Sakai – mastering
- Kōhei Kadowaki – cover artwork design

Music video

- Kōhei Kadowaki – director, producer
- Naoki Okada – assistant
- Satoshi Ono – assistant
- Mayuka Kawamura – assistant
- Tokurō Kitamura – assistant
- Kaoru Kimura – assistant
- Ken'ichirō Tachikawa – assistant
- Rina Machida – assistant
- Mayu Watanabe – assistant

== Charts ==
=== Weekly charts ===
Weekly chart performance for "Yasashii Suisei"
Chart (2021)	Peak position
Global Excl. US (Billboard)	97
Japan (Oricon) with "Kaibutsu"	2
Japan Combined Singles (Oricon) with "Kaibutsu"	2
Japan Hot 100 (Billboard)	14
Japan Hot Animation (Billboard Japan)	6

=== Monthly charts ===
Monthly chart performance for "Yasashii Suisei"
Chart (2021)	Position
Japan (Oricon) (with "Kaibutsu")	7

=== Year-end charts ===
Year-end chart performance for "Yasashii Suisei"
Chart (2021)	Position
Japan (Oricon) with "Kaibutsu"	94
Japan Combined Singles (Oricon) with "Kaibutsu"	2
Japan Hot 100 (Billboard)	70
Japan Hot Animation (Billboard Japan)	11

== Certifications ==
Certifications for "Yasashii Suisei"
Region	Certification	Certified units/sales
Japan (RIAJ)	Gold	100,000^{*}
Streaming
Japan (RIAJ)	Platinum	100,000,000^{†}
^{*} Sales figures based on certification alone.^{†} Streaming-only figures based on certification alone.

== Release history ==
Release dates and formats for "Yasashii Suisei"
Region	Date	Format	Version	Label	Ref.
Various	January 20, 2021	Digital download; streaming	Original	Sony Japan	
Japan	March 24, 2021	CD+DVD; CD+Blu-ray	Limited; fanclub limited	Sony Japan	
Taiwan	May 28, 2021	CD+DVD	Limited	Sony Taiwan	
