= Haruka (Yoasobi song) =

2020 single by Yoasobi

Single by Yoasobi

from the EP The Book
- Language: Japanese
- Released: December 18, 2020
- Genre: J-pop
- Length: 4:04
- Label: Sony Japan
- Songwriter: Ayase
- Producer: Ayase

Yoasobi singles chronology
"Gunjō" (2020)	"Haruka" (2020)	"Kaibutsu" (2021)

Music video
- "Haruka" on YouTube; English version on YouTube

"Haruka" (Japanese: ハルカ) is a song by Japanese duo Yoasobi from their debut EP, The Book (2021). It was released as a single on December 18, 2020, through Sony Music Entertainment Japan. The song was based on the short story, Tsuki Ōji (lit. "Moon Prince"), written by screenwriter Osamu Suzuki. The music video premiered alongside the single release. The English version of the song was included on the duo's second English-language EP E-Side 2, released on November 18, 2022.

== Composition and lyrics ==
"Haruka" was described as a song about encounter and farewell, drawing from the perspective of a mug that has watched over a girl's growth more than anyone else. It is composed in the key of C♯ major at 100 beats per minute with a running time of 4 minutes and 4 seconds.

== Other uses ==
"Haruka" was used as a graduation song in numerous schools. The song featured on Mynavi's web series Kimi no Shinjiru Mono wa?.

== Credits and personnel ==
- Ayase – producer, songwriter
- Ikura – vocals
- Osamu Suzuki – based story writer
- Takayuki Saitō – vocal recording
- Masahiko Fukui – mixing
- Hidekazu Sakai – mastering
- Kanae Izumi – music video animation, cover artwork design

== Charts ==
=== Weekly charts ===
Weekly chart performance for "Haruka"
Chart (2020–2021)	Peak position
Global Excl. US (Billboard)	121
Japan Combined Singles (Oricon)	18
Japan Hot 100 (Billboard)	17

=== Year-end charts ===
2021 year-end chart performance for "Haruka"
Chart (2021)	Position
Japan Hot 100 (Billboard)	37

2022 year-end chart performance for "Haruka"
Chart (2022)	Position
Japan Streaming Songs (Billboard Japan)	85

== Certifications ==
Certifications for "Haruka"
Region	Certification	Certified units/sales
Japan (RIAJ)	Gold	100,000^{*}
Streaming
Japan (RIAJ)	3× Platinum	300,000,000^{†}
^{*} Sales figures based on certification alone.^{†} Streaming-only figures based on certification alone.

== Release history ==
Release dates and formats for "Haruka"
Region	Date	Format	Label	Ref.
Various	December 18, 2020	Digital download; streaming	Sony Japan	
