= Gunjō (song) =

2020 single by Yoasobi

Single by Yoasobi

from the EP The Book
- Language: Japanese
- English title: "Blue"
- Released: September 1, 2020
- Genre: J-pop
- Length: 4:08
- Label: Sony Japan
- Songwriter: Ayase
- Producer: Ayase

Yoasobi singles chronology
"Tabun" (2020)	"Gunjō" (2020)	"Haruka" (2020)

Music video
- "Gunjō" on YouTube "Blue" on YouTube

"Gunjō" (Japanese: 群青; lit. 'Ultramarine') is a song by Japanese duo Yoasobi, featuring an uncredited chorus by cover group Plusonica, from their debut EP, The Book (2021). It was released as a single by Sony Music Entertainment Japan on September 1, 2020. Inspired by Tsubasa Yamaguchi's manga Blue Period and based on a story text Ao o Mikata ni, the song is described as "a cheering song that inspires listeners by immersing themselves in what they like and expressing what they see."

The music video was uploaded on December 1, and surpassed 100 million views on May 30, 2022. The English version, titled "Blue", was released on October 29, 2021. "Gunjō" was certified diamond by the Recording Industry Association of Japan (RIAJ) after surpassing 500 million streams in the country, the duo's second song after "Yoru ni Kakeru".

== Live performances ==
Yoasobi performed "Gunjō" for the first time as a full group, including band members, and Plusonica on the YouTube channel The First Take, uploaded on February 26, 2021. After their second extended play The Book 2 announcement, Yoasobi appeared on Best Artist 2021, giving a televised debut performance of the song on November 17. They performed the song at the year-end television special 72nd NHK Kōhaku Uta Gassen on December 31. The show depicted Ikura standing on the escalator downstairs to perform on the stage, where Ayase, the band members, and the orchestra gathered there.

== Usage in media ==
"Gunjō" was featured on Bourbon's Alfort Mini Chocolate advertisement in 2020. Additionally, it was also used as a theme of Dance One Project '21, a project that supports high school's dance club held by morning show Sukkiri, and accompanied the 94th High School Baseball Tournament entrance march. In January 2024, "Gunjō" was mashed up with Vaundy's "Hana Uranai", and fryer chime's sound, titled "Tirori Remix 2024" for McDonald's Japan's promotional video. The song appeared on the special promotional video for the live-action film adaption of Blue Period.

== Track listing ==
- Digital download and streaming
1. "Gunjō" (群青) – 4:08
- Digital download and streaming (English version)
1. "Blue" – 4:08

== Credits and personnel ==
Song

- Ayase – songwriter, producer
- Ikura – vocals
- Alfort Creative Team – based story writer
- AssH – guitar
- Plusonica (Note: Consisting of Narita Ayori, Hikari Codama, Miki Maria, Masa, Miku Motomatsu, Natsumi, Kosei Nishiyama, Saki, Suzu, and Tetsuto) – chorus
- Takayuki Saitō – vocal recording
- Masahiko Fukui – mixing
- Hidekazu Sakai – mastering
- Nina Ai – artwork cover design

Music video

- Atsushi Makino – director
- Tōru Akamatsu – cinematographer
- Keigo Suzuki – lightning director
- Tomomi Kawano – art
- Toshirō Tabata – editor

== Charts ==
=== Weekly charts ===
Weekly chart performance for "Gunjō"
Chart (2020–2023)	Peak position
Global 200 (Billboard)	44
Hong Kong (Billboard)	20
Japan Combined Singles (Oricon)	9
Japan Hot 100 (Billboard)	6
US World Digital Song Sales (Billboard)	14

Chart performance for "Blue"
Chart (2021)	Peak position
Japan Digital Singles (Oricon)	13

=== Year-end charts ===
2020 year-end chart performance for "Gunjō"
Chart (2020)	Position
Japan Hot 100 (Billboard)	91

2021 year-end chart performance for "Gunjō"
Chart (2021)	Position
Global Excl. U.S. (Billboard)	90
Japan Streaming (Oricon)	7
Japan Hot 100 (Billboard)	8

2022 year-end chart performance for "Gunjō"
Chart (2022)	Position
Japan Hot 100 (Billboard)	16

2023 year-end chart performance for "Gunjō"
Chart (2023)	Position
Japan Hot 100 (Billboard)	32

2024 year-end chart performance for "Gunjō"
Chart (2024)	Position
Japan Hot 100 (Billboard)	57

2025 year-end chart performance for "Gunjō"
Chart (2025)	Position
Japan Streaming Songs (Billboard Japan)	81

=== All-time charts ===
All-time chart performance for "Gunjō"
Chart (2008–2022)	Position
Japan Hot 100 (Billboard)	16

== Certifications ==
Certifications for "Gunjō"
Region	Certification	Certified units/sales
Japan (RIAJ)	Platinum	250,000^{*}
Streaming
Japan (RIAJ)	Diamond	500,000,000^{†}
^{*} Sales figures based on certification alone.^{†} Streaming-only figures based on certification alone.

== Release history ==
Release dates and formats for "Gunjō"
Region	Date	Format	Version	Label	Ref.
Various	September 1, 2020	Digital download; streaming	Original (Japanese)	Sony Japan	
Various	October 29, 2021	Digital download; streaming	English ("Blue")	Sony Japan	
