= List of Mobile Suit Gundam: The Witch from Mercury episodes =

Cover of the first Blu-ray volume by Emotion, featuring Suletta Mercury and Miorine Rembran.

Mobile Suit Gundam: The Witch from Mercury is a 2022 Japanese mecha television anime series and the fifteenth mainline entry in Sunrise's long-running Gundam franchise. The series is directed by both Hiroshi Kobayashi and Ryō Andō and written by Ichirō Ōkouchi. Takashi Ohmama composed the music for the series.

The anime is composed of two seasons and one special. The first season premiered on all JNN stations in Japan, including MBS and TBS on October 2, 2022, on the network's recently revived Nichigo programming block, with the Prologue special premiering on July 14, 2022, four months before the series airing. The second season began airing in April 2023. Crunchyroll licensed the series through Sunrise. Medialink licensed the series in Southeast Asia and is streaming it on their Ani-One Asia YouTube channel, Netflix, and Bilibili. It is also being streamed on the GundamInfo YouTube channel in Asia and Oceania.

Yoasobi performed the series' first opening theme "Shukufuku" (祝福; "The Blessing") while Yama performed the second opening theme "Slash". Shiyui and Ryo performed the ending theme "Kimi yo Kedakaku Are" (君よ 気高くあれ; "You Be Noble"), while Aina the End performed the second ending theme "Red:Birthmark".

== Series overview ==
Season	Episodes	Originally released	
Season	Episodes	First released	Last released
Prologue	1	July 14, 2022	
1	12	October 2, 2022	January 8, 2023
2	12	April 9, 2023	July 2, 2023

== Episodes ==
=== Prologue ===
No. overall	No. in season	Title	Directed by	Written by	Storyboarded by	Original release date
0	0	"Mobile Suit Gundam: The Witch from Mercury – Prologue"; Transliteration: "Kidō Senshi Gandamu: Suisei no Majo – Purorōgu" (Japanese: 機動戦士ガンダム 水星の魔女「PROLOGUE」)	Teruo Sato	Ichirō Ōkouchi	Hiroshi Kobayashi	July 14, 2022
In the far future, humanity has developed GUND technology, allowing them to operate machines with their minds, revolutionizing prosthetics. However, when the technology's developers, the Vanadis Institute, are acquired by arms developer Ochs Earth, they are forced to start developing mobile suits, codenamed GUND-ARMs, or "Gundams". These weapons become controversial because of the strain they put on the pilot, crippling or even killing them. Undeterred, Vanadis experiments with a new prototype Gundam, though the test pilot, Elnora, has so far been unable to activate it. Meanwhile, with their validity being questioned, the weapons industry's self-regulator, the Mobile Suit Development Council, cracks down on Gundams by defunding Ochs Earth and creating a special task force, Cathedra, to enforce the ban. Delling Rembran, the leader of the task force, launches an unsanctioned attack on Vanadis with the Council's security forces, Dominicus; the result is a massacre. Elnora and her daughter, Ericht, take shelter in the prototype when the machine suddenly activates in response to Ericht's bio-signs. This allows Elnora to pilot the Gundam to safety while her husband, Nadim, sacrifices himself to hold off their pursuers.

=== Season 1 (2022–23) ===
No. overall	No. in season	Title	Directed by	Written by	Storyboarded by	Original release date (Note: Season 1 premiered on MBS and TBS on October 2, 2022 at 5:00 p.m. JST.)
1	1	"The Witch and the Bride"; Transliteration: "Majo to Hanayome" (Japanese: 魔女と花嫁)	Ryō Andō	Ichirō Ōkouchi	Hiroshi Kobayashi	October 2, 2022
En route to attend the Asticassia School of Technology, Suletta Mercury rescues a stranded astronaut only to learn that she is Delling's daughter, Miorine Rembran, who was trying to escape. Arriving at Asticassia, Suletta shadows Miorine, prompting the latter to explain the school's regulations: students are divided into Houses sponsored by companies, with the top ones being Jeturk House with Jeturk Heavy Machinery, Grassley House with Grassley Defense Systems, and Peil House with Peil Technologies. The school's top pilot, Holder Guel from Jeturk House, then confronts them and harasses Miorine for trying to flee. Suletta stands up for Miorine, prompting Guel to challenge her to a duel, a fight with a wager between students. However, Miorine commandeers Suletta's Mobile Suit, the Aerial, and faces Guel herself, but is outmatched. Meanwhile, Guel's father, Jeturk's CEO Vim, plans to assassinate Delling, now president of the Benerit Group business conglomerate, to ensure his son's position. Fortunately, Suletta enters the dueling arena with help from Earth House member Nika, retakes control of the Aerial, and easily defeats Guel, prompting Vim to cancel the assassination. Afterward, Suletta is made the new Holder, and Miorine's fiancée, leaving her flabbergasted.
2	2	"Cursed Mobile Suit"; Transliteration: "Noroi no Mobiru Sūtsu" (Japanese: 呪いのモビルスーツ)	Tatsuma Minamikawa	Ichirō Ōkouchi	Tomoki Kyoda	October 9, 2022
Following the duel, Suletta is confined under suspicion of using a Gundam, where she is visited by Peil House head Elan, who has grown interested in her. Taking charge of the investigation, Cathedra launches an inquiry into the Aerial's manufacturer, the Shin Sei Development Corporation. Meanwhile, Miorine feels conflicted over Suletta's arrest when she is informed that her father has transferred her out of Asticassia. Furious, she runs into the smuggler she hired for her previous escape attempt, Feng Jun, and has her take her to him. At the hearing, Shin Sei's CEO, Suletta's mother Elnora, who now goes by "Prospera", denies the Aerial being a Gundam, citing that it does not strain the pilot, but Delling remains unconvinced. Just then, however, Miorine intrudes and, angry at her father controlling her life, challenges him to a duel: if she wins, her transfer and Suletta's charges will be dropped; if Delling wins, Miorine will follow his wishes. Vim, having been blackmailed by Prospera with proof of his assassination plot, then causes a split amongst the Benerit Group, forcing Delling to agree. Afterward, Miorine confronts Suletta and informs her that she must win the duel or be expelled.
3	3	"Guel's Pride"; Transliteration: "Gueru no Puraido" (Japanese: グエルのプライド)	Ryō Andō, Shinnosuke Itō	Ichirō Ōkouchi	Ryō Andō	October 16, 2022
Suletta is reinstated as a student for the upcoming duel, which is a rematch against Guel. To ensure his victory, Vim gives Guel his company's newest mobile suit, the Darilbalde, which comes equipped with an auto-pilot, ignoring his son's wish to fight with his own strength. Meanwhile, Grassley's CEO, Sarius Zenelli, grows suspicious of Prospera and orders his son, Grassley House head Shaddiq, to investigate Suletta. As the duel commences, the arena's heat management system suddenly activates, neutralizing the Aerial's beam weaponry with water. Realizing that Vim has hacked the system, Miorine commandeers a maintenance mobile craft and disables the system. With her weapons operational again, Suletta turns the tide. However, not wanting an AI to fight for him, Guel takes back control and fights back with all of his strength, with Suletta narrowly prevailing over him. Afterward, Suletta shows respect for Guel's piloting skill, causing him to become infatuated with her and propose on the spot, much to her shock.
4	4	"Unseen Trap"; Transliteration: "Mienai Jirai" (Japanese: みえない地雷)	Shouji Ikeno	Ichirō Ōkouchi	Susumu Nishizawa	October 23, 2022
Everybody is shocked by Guel's proposal, including Suletta who rejects him. On the next day, however, Guel denies loving Suletta. Later, Suletta attempts a mobile suit exam but fails due to lacking a House's support. Another student, Earth House member Chuatury "ChuChu" Panlunch also attempts it but fails due to her mobile suit's camera having been sprayed over by bullies. It is revealed ChuChu resents Spacians due to the discrimination Earthians like her suffer. As a result, when Suletta asks Earth House to assist her, ChuChu chases her off. Miorine agrees to assist her, prompting Suletta to confide in her about her dream of founding her own school on Mercury. The next day, Suletta and ChuChu take the makeup test. However, the same bullies have blinded Suletta's mobile suit, and the proctors refuse to let Miorine remove the paint. After numerous failed retries, Suletta breaks down from the pressure, causing ChuChu to assault the two bullies on her behalf and resulting in a fight that forces the makeup test to be rescheduled. Afterward, with ChuChu's begrudging acceptance, Suletta is welcomed into the Earth House.
5	5	"Reflection in an Icy Eye"; Transliteration: "Kōri no Hitomi ni Utsuru no wa" (Japanese: 氷の瞳に映るのは)	Kiyoshi Egami	Ichirō Ōkouchi	Hiroshi Kobayashi, Shinya Watada, Kiyoshi Egami	October 30, 2022
Elan, revealed to be a genetically modified human designed to pilot Gundams, codenamed Elan-04, is ordered by Peil Industries' leadership to investigate Suletta, whom he believes is enhanced like himself. Using his status as a member of Asticassia's Duelling Committee, he convinces Suletta to let him pilot the Aerial as part of a mandatory Mobile Suit check-up. He confirms that it is indeed a Gundam, as it uses the GUND-Format, but also finds that it does not strain him. Concluding that this perfected GUND-Format came solely from the Aerial, Elan-04 loses all interest in Suletta and rejects her attempts at friendship, leaving her devastated. Witnessing this, Guel gets angry at Elan-04 on Suletta's behalf, prompting the latter to challenge him to a duel with the wager being the right to challenge Suletta. Meanwhile, Prospera meets an old colleague from the Vanadis Institute, Belmeria Winston, who now begrudgingly works for Peil Technologies as Elan's caretaker. Back at Asticassia, Elan-04 unveils a new Mobile Suit, the Gundam Pharact, and easily defeats Guel. Afterward, Elan calls Suletta and tells her his wager for their duel: ownership of the Aerial.
6	6	"A Gloomy Song"; Transliteration: "Uttōshii Uta" (Japanese: 鬱陶しい歌)	Akihiro Saitō	Ichirō Ōkouchi	Akihiro Saitō	November 6, 2022
Belmeria tries to convince Prospera to stop seeking revenge for the Vanadis massacre, but the latter brushes her off. Later, she does a physical check-up on Elan-04 where it's revealed that he also serves as a body-double for the real Elan Ceres, Peil Technologies' successor, and that his body can only survive the strain of one more battle. At Asticassia, Guel is kicked out of Jeturk House by his father for losing to Elan-04 while Earth House builds a flight unit for the Aerial to help Suletta in her upcoming duel against Elan-04, which is set to take place in space. Suletta also tries reaching out to Elan-04 again but to no avail, prompting her to make her wager for the duel that he must tell her more about himself. During the duel, Elan-04 eventually corners Suletta by destroying the Aerial's flight unit. However, the Gundam inexplicably activates on its own and uses its GUND-Format to shut down the Pharact, causing Suletta to be declared the victor. Afterward, Elan-04 finally begins opening up to Suletta. However, as Suletta waits to meet up with him the next day, Peil Technologies secretly kills him for his failure.
7	7	"Shall We Gundam?"; Transliteration: "Sharu Ui Gandamu?" (Japanese: シャル・ウィ・ガンダム?)	Shunichi Yoshizawa	Kō Yoneyama	Masahiko Ōkura	November 20, 2022
Still worried about Elan-04, Suletta is invited to the "Incubation Party", an annual meeting for startups held by the Benerit Group. She and Miorine attend together. During the party, Suletta meets Elan Ceres, believing him to be the Elan whom she knows. The CEOs of Peil Technologies publicly confront Suletta with proof that Aerial is a Gundam. To protect Aerial, Miorine announces that she will start a new company called Gund-Arm Inc. to research safe applications for the Gund-Arm technology. She manages to fund the company with her father's symbolic support. Prospera and Miorine cross swords briefly. Prospera admits to Suletta that Aerial is a Gundam.
8	8	"Their Choice"; Transliteration: "Karera no Saitaku" (Japanese: 彼らの採択)	Yoshio Suzuki, Masakazu Sunazawa, Shouji Ikeno, Ryō Andō	Yasuhiro Nakanishi	Hiromitsu Kanazawa	November 27, 2022
Miorine recruits the members of Earth House for the new company and makes it their base of operations. To learn more about the GUND format technology, she consults with both Prospera and Belmeria for information but both she and the rest of her companions are at doubt about working in a company that sells weapons. Meanwhile, Shaddiq makes repeated offers to buy out Gund-Arm since he believes Gundams are the future of the Benerit Group, but Miorine refuses. However, upon learning more about Cardo Nabo and her intentions, Miorine decides that the focus of her company will be improving the GUND format for medical applications which was its original purpose. Having convinced the others about her vision, Miorine prepares to launch her company, until she learns that Shaddiq had the school regulations altered to prevent that, intending to seize Aerial and all technology related to it for himself.
9	9	"If I Could Take One More Step Toward You"; Transliteration: "Ato Ippo, Kimi ni Fumidaseta nara" (Japanese: あと一歩、キミに踏み出せたなら)	Akira Toba, Shinya Watada	Yasuhiro Nakanishi	Hiroshi Kobayashi, Shinya Watada, Susumu Nishizawa	December 4, 2022
Shaddiq attempts to convince Miorine to sign Gund-Arm over to him under the guise of saving the company. However, she deduces that he changed the rules himself to force the situation and challenges him to a team match between Earth House and Grassley House; if Miorine wins, the change to the school regulations will be reverted while Shaddiq will gain control of Gund-Arm if he wins. Suletta also tries asking Guel for help, but he reveals that he has been forbidden from dueling and is later withdrawn from school by his father. As the duel begins, most of Earth House is quickly defeated while the Aerial gets shut down using jamming technology. However, Suletta's bond with her mobile suit allows its Gund-Format to reach a level where it can overwrite anti-Gundam weaponry, allowing her to turn the tide. In the end, Shaddiq catches Suletta off guard but gets sniped by ChuChu, ending the duel in Earth House's victory. Afterward, Shaddiq asks Miorine if things would have been different if he had made more effort to win her affection, to which she just bitterly remarks that his regret is "too little, too late".
10	10	"Circling Thoughts"; Transliteration: "Meguru Omoi" (Japanese: 巡る想い)	Seung-hui Son, Kōtarō Matsunaga, Ryō Andō	Ichirō Ōkouchi	Tomoki Kyoda	December 11, 2022
Two months after forming Gund-Arm, Miorine has been promoting the company while Suletta and Earth House developed a set of prosthetic legs. Miorine also purchases a ship and hires Feng Jun as a pilot, having deduced that she is really an agent from Space Assembly League sent to observe Gund-Arm. However, all of this causes Miorine to grow distanced from Suletta, causing the latter to question if they were ever truly friends. At the same time, Peil Technologies introduces a new body double of Elan, Elan-05, to seduce Suletta into giving out the Aerial's secrets, but she senses something is amiss and rejects his advances. Elsewhere, tired of Delling's authoritarianism, Vim proposes to Sarius that they should assassinate him during an upcoming meeting with Prospera at Plant Quetta. Shaddiq convinces his adoptive father to go along with the plan and he uses Nika's connections to hire the Earth-based mercenary group Dawn of Fold to do the deed. Meanwhile, Guel ran away from home and joined a space transport crew. However, the ship is hijacked by Dawn of Fold en route to Plant Quetta while Shaddiq reveals to his comrades that he actually plans to break up the Benerit Group entirely.
11	11	"The Witches from Earth"; Transliteration: "Chikyū no Majo" (Japanese: 地球の魔女)	Kōhei Kuratomi, Shinya Watada	Ichirō Ōkouchi	Hiromitsu Kanazawa, Shinya Watada, Hiroshi Kobayashi	December 25, 2022
Earth House arrives at Plant Quetta to pick up the newly-rebuilt Aerial, which was damaged during the duel with Grassley House. However, Suletta grows increasingly insecure, fearing her friends intend to discard her. Meanwhile, Prospera and Delling are revealed to be working together on a secret project called Quiet Zero. Elsewhere, Guel and the transport crew he joined are captured by Dawn of Fold while they use their ship to smuggle their men to Plant Quetta, with him noticing that they are using Jeturk mobile suits. Later, as part of their assassination plot, Vim places a tracker on one of Delling's men during a meeting before attempting to leave the Plant, unaware that Shaddiq moved up the timetable of the attack to kill him as well. Back with Suletta, Miorine overhears her worries and, having been told by Nika to pay more attention to the former's feelings, admits that her life has greatly improved since she met her. Just then, however, Dawn of Fold launches its attack. Led by Gundam pilots Sophie and Norea, they separate part of Plant Quetta from the main station, isolating Delling and separating Suletta and Miorine.
12	12	"Keep Marching On Instead of Running Off"; Transliteration: "Nigedasu Yori mo Susumu Koto wo" (Japanese: 逃げ出すよりも進むことを)	Shinnosuke Itō, Akihiro Saitō, Akira Toba, Ryō Andō	Ichirō Ōkouchi	Tomoki Kyoda, Ryō Andō, Hiroshi Kobayashi	January 8, 2023
Dawn of Fold continues their attack on Plant Quetta, swiftly eliminating the local garrison and landing troops inside the station to search for Delling. Nika signals them not to attack Earth House but is caught in the act by House leader Martin. Meanwhile, Miorine meets up with her father but he gets badly wounded while protecting her, prompting her to administer first aid. Elsewhere, Guel escapes his captors and steals a Dawn of Fold mobile suit, only to be attacked by Vim, who took to the frontlines after realizing he was double-crossed. Guel is forced to defend himself and kills Vim, discovering his identity too late. Back with Suletta, she makes her way to Aerial's hangar where she meets up with Elnora, who tells her that, to protect Miorine, she must be willing to kill. Mobilizing the newly upgraded Aerial, she easily overwhelms Sophie and Norea just as Dominicus forces arrive, forcing Dawn of Fold to retreat. Suletta then tracks down Miorine and uses Aerial to crush a stray Dawn of Fold soldier threatening her, leaving Miorine in shock at how Suletta could so casually kill a person.

=== Season 2 (2023) ===
No. overall	No. in season	Title	Directed by	Written by	Storyboarded by	Original release date (Note: Season 2 premiered on MBS and TBS on April 9, 2023 at 5:00 p.m. JST.)
13	1	"Envoys from the Earth"; Transliteration: "Daichi kara no Shisha" (Japanese: 大地からの使者)	Masatoshi Hakata, Moe Suzuki, Akira Toba	Yasuhiro Nakanishi	Hiroshi Kobayashi, Ryō Andō, Kanta Suzuki	April 9, 2023
Two weeks following the Plant Quetta incident, the event was covered up and most of Earth House returned to Asticassia while Miorine stayed with the now comatose Delling. After defending her title in successive matches, Suletta learns of an upcoming open campus where she, as Holder, must participate in a battle royale event. Meanwhile, Sarius is made acting head of the Benerit Group and cracks down on Dawn of Fold while shifting blame to Jeturk Heavy Machineries, now headed by Guel's younger brother Lauda, for letting their mobile suits fall into terrorist hands. Back at Asticassia, Shaddiq has his own plans that involve having Norea and Sophie infiltrate the school and join Earth House, much to Nika's dismay. During the open campus, the duo is ordered to sabotage the Pharact but Nika threatens to expose them, prompting them to attempt to silence her. However, Suletta comes to Nika's aid and challenges the two to a duel, which Sophie accepts. Elsewhere, Prospera meets Miorine and tells her about Quiet Zero, wanting her to continue the project.
14	2	"What They Wish For"; Transliteration: "Kanojotachi no Negai" (Japanese: 彼女たちのネガイ)	Shinnosuke Itō, Kohei Kuratomi, Kōsuke Shimotori	Yasuhiro Nakanishi	Hiroshi Kobayashi, Shinya Watada, Kanta Suzuki	April 16, 2023
Prospera explains to Miorine that Quiet Zero will use the Gund-Format to take control of any technology, effectively eliminating war. At Asticassia, Suletta and other students participate in the battle royale while Sarius bears witness. However, the event is interrupted by Norea and Sophie with their Gundams and an army of drones, injuring and killing participants while causing havoc among the guests. Nika tries to report them but is stopped by Grassley House, the attack being a distraction while they kidnap Sarius. Meanwhile, Belmeria confronts Prospera and realizes that the Aerial contains the mind of the latter's first daughter, Ericht, explaining why it does not strain the pilot: Ericht takes it instead. Prospera then asks for her assistance on Quiet Zero, intending to "rewrite the world so Ericht can be happy". Back at Asticassia, Ericht takes control of the Aerial's Gund-Format and shuts down Sophie's Gundam and drones. However, Sophie refuses to back down and the strain from piloting her Gundam kills her. Afterward, Norea recovers Sophie's body while Earth House is detained for suspected terrorism. Suletta is troubled by Sophie's death, but Ericht convinces her that she did the right thing.
15	3	"Father and Child"; Transliteration: "Chichi to Ko to" (Japanese: 父と子と)	Akira Toba, Akihiro Saitō, Shinnosuke Itō	Kō Yoneyama	Hiroshi Kobayashi, Masahiko Ōkura	April 23, 2023
Since the Plant Quetta incident, Guel has been a Dawn of Fold prisoner. With the Benerit Group cracking down on them, the organization abandons its base and evacuates the refugees they are protecting. At Asticassia, Shaddiq reveals to the imprisoned Nika and Sarius that he intends to sell the Benerit Group's assets to Earth and remove the power imbalance between Earthians and Spacians. On Earth, Dawn of Fold's leader, Naji, handles the evacuation while his lieutenant, Olcott, a former Cathedra soldier who switched sides after losing his son, barely holds off their pursuers at the cost of losing his entire squad. Meanwhile, Guel escapes and tries to save a child who was caught in the crossfire, only for her to die in his arms. Afterward, with Olcott letting him go, Guel resolves to return to space and save his father's company. Elsewhere, Miorine asks Delling's aide, Dominicus head Rajan Zahi, about Quiet Zero. He reveals that her mother came up with the concept, but also cautions her about following in her father's footsteps.
16	4	"Cycle of Sin"; Transliteration: "Zaika no Wa" (Japanese: 罪過の輪)	Shouji Ikeno	Ichirō Ōkouchi	Tomoki Kyoda, Hiromitsu Kanazawa	April 30, 2023
Prospera explains to Belmeria that Ericht died due to her having a weak body, so she transferred her mind into the Aerial, before blackmailing her into joining Quiet Zero, intending to use it to unbind her daughter from the Gundam. With Delling in a coma and Sarius missing, the Benerit Group opts to hold an election for a new president, which Shaddiq intends to win. At the same time, Guel returns to his family and assumes ownership of his father's company. Meanwhile, Dawn of Fold's recent attacks and the Benerit Group's subsequent crackdowns have worsened Earthian and Spacian relations, prompting Feng Jun to intensify her investigation. At Asticassia, Earth House faces amplified discrimination despite being cleared of suspicion while Elan-05 is ordered to steal the Aerial, but Ericht violently ejects him. Miorine also returns to Asticassia and confronts Suletta about her killing, becoming disturbed by her willingness to do anything her mother says. Miorine then confronts Prospera about her using Suletta but is silenced when the latter tells her about the Vanadis massacre before being guilt-tripped into joining Quiet Zero and instructed to win the election.
17	5	"Precious Things"; Transliteration: "Taisetsu na Mono" (Japanese: 大切なもの)	Ayaka Tsujihashi, Toshikazu Yoshizawa, Yohei Shindo	Ichirō Ōkouchi	Tetsuhito Saito, Ryō Andō, Hiroshi Kobayashi	May 7, 2023
Miorine accepts Prospera's demand in return for her freeing Suletta, although the latter warns that her daughter will not willingly part with the Aerial. Meanwhile, Shaddiq allies with Peil Technologies, offering them the rights to Gund-Arm Inc. in return for their support in the election. At Asticassia, Elan-05 confronts Suletta and demands the Aerial but Guel, who just re-enrolled, chases him off, forcing him to blackmail Grassley House into hiding him with Norea and Nika to escape punishment. Guel converses with Suletta about his situation and confesses to her, but she turns him down. However, having overheard their conversation, Miorine has Guel challenge Suletta to a duel after telling him about Prospera and striking a deal: she will marry him and help his company recover if he wins the duel with the bet being ownership of the Aerial. In the end, despite facing trauma from his father's death, Guel manages to win thanks to the Aerial shutting down upon its Gund-Format reaching the level required for Quiet Zero due to a virus that Prospera and Miorine uploaded into it. Afterward, Miorine approaches Suletta, reveals her sabotage, and takes away her Holder title, leaving her heartbroken.
18	6	"Our Empty Selves"; Transliteration: "Karappo na Watashitachi" (Japanese: 空っぽな私たち)	Kohei Kuratomi, Yūshi Ibe, Kōsuke Shimotori	Ichirō Ōkouchi, Kō Yoneyama	Tomoki Kyoda, Hiromitsu Kanazawa, Hiroshi Kobayashi	May 21, 2023
Having lost her Holder title and ownership of the Aerial, Suletta copes by focusing on her studies. However, the Earth House sees that she is bottling up her feelings and takes her to meet Miorine to resolve things. Meanwhile, with Shaddiq leading in the election polls and Guel struggling to rebuild his company, Miorine opts to campaign on peacefully ending the Earthian riots. Elsewhere, Belmeria is assigned to work on Quiet Zero alongside Prospera's aide but is apprehended by Feng Jun for questioning. At Asticassia, it is revealed that Earth House being suspected of terrorism was caused by Martin secretly reporting Nika to the authorities. Arriving at Miorine's location, Suletta is denied a meeting with her and instead led to the Aerial, Ericht having convinced Prospera to let them talk. Ericht then reveals that Suletta is a clone of her and claims to not need her anymore since she can pilot the Aerial by herself now. Afterward, Prospera leaves with the Aerial, telling her daughter to return to Asticassia, causing the abandoned Suletta to break down.
19	7	"Not the Best Way"; Transliteration: "Ichiban ja Nai Yarikata" (Japanese: 一番じゃないやり方)	Akira Toba, Shun Kudo	Ichirō Ōkouchi, Shōgo Yasukawa	Ryō Andō, Hiroshi Kobayashi	May 28, 2023
Abandoned by her family, Suletta has fallen into a depression, much to Earth House's concern. In the end, however, they get her to open up while Martin comes clean about reporting Nika, and is forgiven. On Earth, Miorine negotiates a pause to the riots while Guel reunites with a boy he recognizes from his time as a Dawn of Fold prisoner, who accidentally reveals Shaddiq's connection to them, prompting him to return to Asticassia to collect evidence. However, Prospera then goes rogue and uses the Aerial to hack Earthian weapons into firing on Spacians who promptly retaliate, causing negotiations to break down as the area turns into a warzone, which she uses a distraction to destroy a secret Gundam factory run by the Space Assembly League, who were planning on forcefully suppressing the Benerit Group. Elsewhere, Belmeria cooperates with Feng Jun, who is trying to stop her superiors from starting a war, only for them to be attacked by Prospera's aide, prompting Feng to sacrifice herself to allow Belmeria to escape. Afterward, Suletta watches a broadcast of the violence and realizes that Ericht pushed her away to protect her while Miorine blames herself for Prospera's actions.
20	8	"The End of Hope"; Transliteration: "Nozomi no Hate" (Japanese: 望みの果て)	Shinnosuke Itō, Akihiro Saitō, Motoki Nakanishi, Kohei Kuratomi, Wakako Kume	Yasuhiro Nakanishi	Tomoki Kyoda, Iwao Teraoka, Hiroshi Kobayashi	June 4, 2023
Guel heads back to Asticassia to find evidence of Shaddiq's crimes but is intercepted by Grassley House while they attempt to relocate Sarius. Elan-05, Nika, and Norea are also released and the latter goes on a rampage throughout Asticassia with her Gundam and drones to avenge the Earth Attack, resulting in Suletta witnessing many of her schoolmates being injured and killed in the crossfire. Guel faces off against Shaddiq and, while the latter is ultimately defeated and surrenders with the rest of Grassley House once the authorities arrive, he does inadvertently reveal to Lauda that Guel killed their father. Back at Asticassia, Nika reunites with Earth House and helps them and the other students defend the school. Meanwhile, Elan-05 manages to convince Norea to stop, having bonded while hiding together, only for her to then be killed by security forces, causing him to snap and avenge her with Sophie's Gundam before fleeing. Afterward, Grassley House gets arrested and Sarius is rescued while Suletta helps search for survivors, with the rest of Earth House soon joining her.
21	9	"What We Can Do Now"; Transliteration: "Ima, Dekiru koto wo" (Japanese: 今、できることを)	Shouji Ikeno, Yohei Shindo	Ichirō Ōkouchi, Shōgo Yasukawa	Naoya Ando, Teruo Sato, Atsuo Tobe, Kō Matsuo, Shinpei Sawa	June 11, 2023
Following Shaddiq's arrest, Miorine has automatically been sworn in as the Benerit Group's new president while Prospera is missing. However, Peil Technologies then publicly leaks the various crimes committed by the conglomerate, giving the Space Assembly League a casus belli to forcefully disband them. While Miorine struggles to respond, Prospera comes out of hiding with the now mostly-completed Quiet Zero, a huge battle station equipped with an army of drones operated by Ericht that hack and destroy the League's fleet, causing Miorine to regret her role in the superweapon's creation. Meanwhile, at Asticassia, Earth House aids survivors when they are approached by Belmeria and Feng Jun's partner, Guston, who request Suletta to reason with Prospera. However, she assures them that her mother will not listen to her, accepting that her well-being has always been secondary to Prospera. Guston then suggests an alternative option: Suletta facing Prospera with a Gundam that the League recovered from the Vanadis Institute, the Calibarn. While Belmeria warns that this Mobile Suit has no safeties, Suletta accepts, with Earth House and Elan-05, who overheard them, also joining. Elsewhere, Lauda has taken to blaming Miorine for Jeturk House's misfortunes.
22	10	"The Woven Path"; Transliteration: "Tsumugareru Michi" (Japanese: 紡がれる道)	Nana Harada, Moe Suzuki, Masatoshi Hakada, Kiyoshi Egami, Shouji Ikeno	Ichirō Ōkouchi, Kō Yoneyama	Tomoki Kyoda, Susumu Nishizawa	June 18, 2023
As Prospera continues destroying Space Assembly League forces using Quiet Zero, Miorine becomes depressed. Earth House, joined by Jeturk House member Felsi and Duelling Committee member Rouji, arrive at the Benerit Group Headquarters to retrieve the Calibarn and Guel challenges Suletta to a fencing match for the Holder title, which she wins. He then takes her to meet Miorine and the two have a heart-to-heart during which Suletta convinces her that they must move forward despite their mistakes, causing her to regain her confidence and promise the newly awakened Delling to protect the Group. With Quiet Zero headed toward the headquarters to acquire components to expand its range, Earth House and the Group make a counter-strategy: since only Gundams can resist Quiet Zero's hacking, Suletta will serve as a distraction while Earth House infiltrates the space station. However, just as the operation commences, Lauda tries to assassinate Miorine using the Gundam Schwarzette, which his father secretly developed, forcing Guel to fend him off. Meanwhile, despite the strain that piloting the Calibarn puts on her, Suletta manages to breach Quiet Zero's defenses before being confronted by the Aerial, piloted by Ericht.
23	11	"Unrelenting Tenderness"; Transliteration: "Yuzurenai Yasashisa" (Japanese: 譲れない優しさ)	Akira Toba, Kohei Kuratomi, Kōsuke Shimotori, Shuu Watanabe, Terry	Ichirō Ōkouchi, Yasuhiro Nakanishi	Iwao Teraoka, Yoshiyuki Kaneko, Hiromitsu Kanazawa, Shunichi Yoshizawa, Taisuke Mori, Kia Asamiya, Yoshitomo Yonetani	June 25, 2023
Suletta faces Ericht but gets slowly overwhelmed while the latter's drones intercept Earth House. However, Quiet Zero then momentarily shuts down, seemingly having a will of its own, allowing the team to board the battle station. Meanwhile, Guel refuses to fight Lauda and allows his mobile suit to get stabbed in atonement for their father's death, shocking the latter back to his senses. Fortunately, Felsi intervenes and prevents Guel's mobile suit from exploding. Elsewhere, Delling calls for an emergency session with the Space Assembly League, but they ignore the request and prepare to fire the ILTS, an interplanetary super laser, to destroy both Quiet Zero and the Benerit Group headquarters. Back with Earth House, Prospera intercepts them but is disarmed by Elan-05 while Miorine uses a backdoor into the Quiet Zero's systems left by her mother to shut down the superweapon. However, despite Delling once again requesting them to stand down, the League uses this opportunity to fire the ILTS. Acting quickly to protect her family, Ericht uses the Aerial and Quiet Zero's drones to block the shot, leaving her Gundam body severely damaged.
24	12	"May All Blessings Find Their Way To You, I'm Wishing It"; Transliteration: "Meippai no Shukufuku wo Kimi ni" (Japanese: 目一杯の祝福を君に)	Ryō Andō, Shinya Watada, Shinnosuke Itō, Shouji Ikeno, Akihiro Saitō, Motoki Nakanishi	Ichirō Ōkouchi	Tomoki Kyoda, Shinnosuke Itō, Hiroshi Kobayashi	July 2, 2023
Despite beginning to succumb to the strain of piloting the Calibarn, Suletta brings the Aerial's remains to Quiet Zero where Prospera, who has captured Earth House, orders her to reinstall Ericht onto it. However, she refuses and combines the Gund-Format of the Calibarn, Aerial, Pharact, and Schwarzette to shut down the ILTS before destroying the Gundams and Quiet Zero, with Prospera giving up on her ambitions upon seeing that Ericht has sided with Suletta. Meanwhile, Miorine makes a public announcement where she dissolves the Benerit Group and sells the assets to Earth through an arrangement with Shaddiq, causing the Space Assembly League to lose its intervention justification. Three years later, Nika reunites with Earth House after serving time for her crimes, Guel rebuilds Jeturk Industries, Elan Ceres oversees a re-opened Asticassia, Elan-05 lives free from the now-disbanded Peil Industries, Gund-Arm Inc. has become a successful business, Shaddiq, Delling, and Sarius are taken to court, and Miorine is a negotiator between Earth and Space. Miorine and Earth House then meet up with Suletta, who is now married to the former and living peacefully with Prospera and Ericht, whose mind was transferred into a mechanical keychain, while undergoing rehab and vying to open her own school.
