= Suletta Mercury =

Fictional character in Gundam franchise

- Mobile Suit Gundam: The Witch from Mercury character
- Promotional illustration featuring character design for the anime's first season
- First appearance: "The Witch and the Bride"; Mobile Suit Gundam: The Witch from Mercury; October 2, 2022
- Last appearance: "May All Blessings Find Their Way To You, I'm Wishing It"; Mobile Suit Gundam: The Witch from Mercury; July 2, 2023
- Created by: Sunrise
- Designed by: Mogumo
- Voiced by: Japanese; Kana Ichinose; English; Jill Harris

In-universe information
- Species: Human
- Gender: Female
- Occupation: Pilot
- Family: Prospera Mercury (mother); Nadim Samaya (father, deceased); Ericht Samaya (older sister)
- Significant other: Miorine Rembran (wife)
- Home: Mercury

Suletta Mercury (Japanese: スレッタ・マーキュリー, Hepburn: Suretta Mākyurī) is the protagonist of Mobile Suit Gundam: The Witch from Mercury. Suletta Mercury is a young transfer from Mercury to the Asticassia School of Technology, an academic institute run by the megacorporation Benerit Group. Upon arrival, she encounters a girl escaping the institute, Miorine Rembran, who wants to escape from the control of Delling, her father. Miorine is engaged to be married to the highest scoring duellist in a mobile suit - currently Guel Jeturk. As their paths cross in the academy with different ambitions and goals, Suletta will have to prove her worth as a pilot as she steps into the academy alongside the Gundam Aerial, a mobile suit built with forbidden GUND Format technology.

Suletta was created by director Hiroshi Kobayashi and writer Ichirō Ōkouchi with her design being done by Mogumo. She was written to have a strong relationship with Miorine and Prospera inspired by William Shakespeare's The Tempest. Her voice actress are Kana Ichinose and Jill Harris. Critical response to Suletta's character has been positive for the first female Gundam TV series protagonist with her relationship with Miorine and her mother being highly praised as the story progressed.

== Concept ==
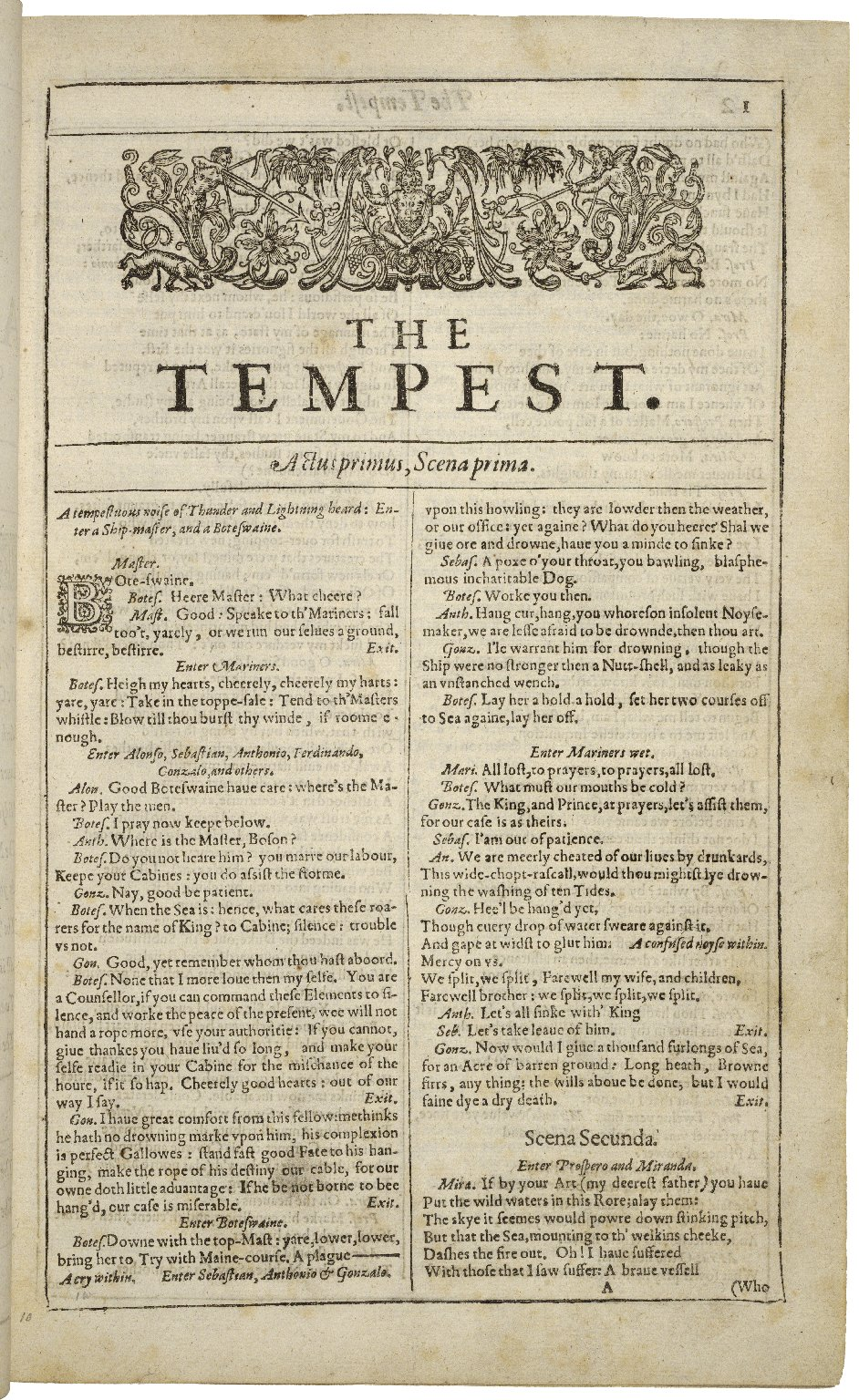
Suletta's character was influenced by William Shakespeare's The Tempest.

According to anime director Hiroshi Kobayashi, Suletta's core character stayed the same in the making of the anime. Conversely, it was parallel with Miorine's arc which led to changes into the making of the series to make their relationship work. The story was based on William Shakespeare's The Tempest resulting in a story where the two characters form a strong bond across the two seasons and Prospera would abandon them. Another major theme of the cast was the focus on father and child relationships which most had issues with. The cliffhanger of the first season where Suletta kills a terrorist with the Aerial was written to be "curse of the Gundam" showing how despite of the character's pacifist ways, she in the end has to use it to kill others in a major dramatic moment.

The major endpoint from the narrative focused on Suletta and Miorine becoming partners and the former's mother giving up revenge similar to The Tempest. They wanted the story to remain ambiguous about good and evil with the sins of Prospera and other adults being passed to Suletta and the remaining young cast. Kobayashi believes that Suletta was prioritized in making this themes work as in the early episodes she was written as an indecisive teenager and becomes more active during the climax. In the end Kobayashi was pleased with how the audience received Suletta.

Writer Ichirō Ōkouchi said that while Suletta is the first female protagonist in the franchise, he did not see it as something noticeable as there were multiple female characters in previous installments like Chris from Mobile Suit Gundam 0080: War in the Pocket or Cagalli from Mobile Suit Gundam SEED who also piloted Gundams. He wanted Suletta not to stand out as he believes all Gundam pilots should be afraid of fights regardless of gender.

The character design of Suletta was made by Mogumo. He took notes from Kobayashi and made an draft of Suletta that fitting for "country bumpkin" from a remote planet. Some changes were done to the facial expressions and hairstyle. Having no knowledge of what would happen in future episodes, Mogumo receives not from the staff to give drawing Suletta like an "awkward girl" with a heroic side fitting of a Gundam protagonist. Suletta Mercury is voiced by Kana Ichinose in Japanese and Jill Harris in English. Ichinose thought that portraying the first female protagonist in a new Gundam series after seven years was fun.

The English dub received controversy due to the decision to have Suletta Mercury be voiced by white voice actor Jill Harris. Suletta Mercury is implied to have Middle Eastern or North African heritage and her father's name Nadim Samaya has Arabic, Hebrew, and Indian origins.

== Appearances ==
=== Mobile Suit Gundam: The Witch from Mercury ===
The series's main protagonist, Suletta, a 17-year-old female Spacian and a second-year student in the piloting department representing Shin Sei Development Corporation, who transferred to the Asticassia School of Technology from Mercury. At Mercury, she was trained to be a mobile suit pilot from a young age and was later sent to the academy by her mother, Prospera Mercury, as part of a bigger revenge scheme against Delling Rembran, the CEO of the Benerit Group. She is shown to be a timid girl who has trouble communicating with people other than her mother; she also has a pathological need to be useful, both towards her housemates and her fiancée Miorine. Despite being a Spacian, she becomes affiliated with the Earth House. As the series progresses, Miorine becomes increasingly conspicuous and egregious on how Suletta is manipulated by Prospera, whose sway over her daughter is so great that she can command her to do anything from abandoning her dreams to committing cold-blooded murder. Suletta pilots the XVX-016 Gundam Aerial, a GUND-Format mobile suit developed by the Shin Sei Development Corporation on Mercury. Its main feature are the "Bit Staves", remote controlled drones that can be used both for offense and defense. It is later upgraded into the XVX-016RN Gundam Aerial Rebuild, which has extra thrusters for improved mobility as well as a new rifle that can combine with the Bit Staves to form a large cannon.

In the second season, she loses in a duel for the first time after a serious fight with mentally broken Guel and the intervention of Miorine, who betrays her in exchange for the opportunity to free Suletta from participating in her mother's cruel plans. Ultimately, the girl meets the spirit of the real Ericht in Aerial, where she reveals the secret of Suletta's origin as her clone and finally lost her connection with her and their mother. Following the events on Prospera's attack on Earth and the Dominicus raid on the academy, she fully found her resolve to correct things that she had done wrong. Following the Quiet Zero Incident, her body is starting to feel the side effects of the Data Storm infection done while piloting the Gundam Calibarn but she persevered further and unlocked the highest Permet Score ever done, stopping the Space Assembly League from firing the ILTS while giving time for Miorine to disband the Benerit Group and dissolve and sell all of its assets. Three years after the incident, she is married to Miorine while ongoing rehabilitation due to the strains on piloting the Gundam. Following the reveal of Prospera's true intentions and the discovery that Aerial contains the mind and biological code of Ericht Samaya, her formerly deceased eldest daughter, the Space Assembly League assigned Suletta to pilot the X-EX01 Gundam Calibarn, a prototype GUND-Format mobile suit developed by the Vanadis Institute and Ochs-Earth and was confiscated by the organization following the incident 21 years ago. People in the institute described the mobile suit as a "monster" due to its lack of Permet Code filtering needed to weather out data storms. It uses a broom-like propulsion unit that doubles as a beam rifle.

=== Other appearances ===
Suletta Mercury appears in Cradle Planet, a prequel novel to the anime. In the novel, she and her mother move to Mercury. The story is from the perspective of Suletta's mecha, Gundam Aerial, who considers Suletta a sister. Gundam Aerial provides a viewpoint for Suletta's backstory as Suletta goes to the Asticassia School of Technology, even though she does not know about Suletta's mother's plans for vengeance. Suletta also appears in a spin-off manga released in 2025, Mobile Suit Gundam: The Witch from Mercury: Seishun Frontier, presented as an alternative version of The Witch from Mercury where they are secondary school students in a "near-future Japan".

Suletta also appears in the Gundam game Gundam Evolution. Regarding media not in the Gundam franchise, she appears in Super Robot Wars Y and Monster Strike. Merchandise featuring or about her includes figures, barrettes, and cosplay pieces.

== Reception ==
=== Popularity ===
Release of anime series and film Mobile Suit Gundam: The Witch From Mercury and Mobile Suit Gundam SEED Freedom marked one of the franchise's milestones at the time, so Suletta was often used to promote the event, along with fellow well-known protagonist Kira Yamato, in many of the franchise's promotions, art, and merchandise. Suletta and Miorinne were also part of a sightseeing tour illustration project through 28 locations the series is broadcast on stations including three prefectures. She was nominated for Crunchyroll's "Must Protect at All Costs" Character in the 2024 Crunchyroll Anime Awards.

=== Critical response ===
James Whitbrook of Gizmodo called Suletta Mercury Gundam's "first-ever primary female protagonist". He stated that her relationship with Miorine Rembran allowed Gundam fans to see what a queer relationship is like. AnimeFeminist praised the usage of female characters in Gundam as main characters, claiming the franchise has a poor portrayal of them describes Suletta as "painfully anxious and an instant target for the cruelest students around her" and saw potential to the themes involving Suletta's and Miorine's origins. Polygon compared her story to Revolutionary Girl Utena and praised her characterization for being different for previous pessismitc protagonists looking for validation but instead a child who wants to befriend others in a slice-of-life story. Screen Rant noted that ever since the early episodes of the series, people started theorizing that Suletta is a clone of Prospera's real child who exists within Aerial. This is further supported by the commentary of how many years pass in between the prologue and the television series with supporting character Elan Ceres also being revealed as a clone dealing with an unstable body with the original appearing in the same episodes. According to Screen Rant, Suletta's relationship with Prospera instead comes across as unhealthy as the mother is actually manipulating the protagonist similar to one of the earliest antagonistic Gundam character Char Aznable whose iconic look is referenced by multiple Gundam antagonist including Prospera. SlashFilm noted parallels between Suletta's ignorance about the power of Aerial with modern audience's knowledge of the franchise which leads to a shocking event for the protagonist when Propspera confesses to her daughter that Aerial is one of multiple mechas labelled as Gundam that are commonly known for its usage in wars. This was further noted to appeal to producer Takuya Okamoto's idea of making Witch from Mercury appeal to modern audiences to know the what the franchise is known for, as he believed it was called "boring" during the release of the series.

The end of the first season of the Witch from Mercury featured Suletta piloting the Gundam Aerial to brutally kill a terrorist. Many viewers and commentators were caught off guard by the sudden act of violence, especially the imagery of Suletta's blood-stained hands and Miorine's horrified reaction. Anime News Network compared the finale to a major twist from Code Geass, another anime project worked by Ichirō Ōkouchi. Both the Witch from Mercury and Code Geass trended on social media as fans reacted to the gruesome scene in Gundam. Japan's Broadcasting Ethics & Program Improvement Organization shared complaints from parents about the violent nature of the episode, with many finding it to be too graphic to show at the 5:00 PM timeslot when children are still up to watch it.

==== Relationship with Miorine Rembram ====
Screen Rant noticed that the series received multiple criticism for being too political despite most Gundam installments providing such type of commentary. As a result, the writer claimed that the series stands out because it is the only anime to portray a LGBTQ+ relationship in a positive fashion in the form of Suletta and Miorine, contrast to negative takes in Gundam Build Divers and Mobile Suit Gundam: Iron-Blooded Orphans. Gizmodo writer James Whitbrok said that the two characters had a strong relationship regardless of the chaos the two are put into like Miroine is shocked by the violence in the first season's cliffhanger and noticed their split from the second season made viewers root for them to be together again. The writer praised the anime's staff for always providing strong scenes when Suletta and Miorine are interacting and how the story focuses on the children's trauma and wonder whether or not the finale will embrace the romance or end in tragedy based on the multiple previous Gundam series that also explored romance and tragic romance. Kenny Nagahama of La República said that the relationship between Suletta and Miorine in the first episode of the anime qualifies this anime for the yuri label.

On July 26, 2023, an interview with Witch from Mercury's voice cast in the September 2023 issue of Gundam Ace magazine included a quote from Kana Ichinose in which she referenced Suletta and Miorine's marriage. Miorine was also directly referenced as Suletta's wife by the official English-language Gundam Twitter account on the day of the finale. Following the release of the magazine interview, the hashtag Sulemio Marriage (スレミオ結婚, Sulemio kekkon) trended in Japan. Days later, however, the digital version of the Gundam Ace interview was edited to remove the direct reference to marriage, causing an immediate backlash from Japanese and Western fans of the show, who claimed the characters' "undisputed" status as a married couple was being deliberately censored.

On July 30, a statement was released by Kadokawa in which they claimed the discrepancy was an error and that the marriage reference was based on conjecture. An accompanying statement was released on the official Witch from Mercury website in which these claims were repeated, in addition to implying the events of the series are open to interpretation by viewers, leading to angry or confused responses from fans and general viewers who pointed out Suletta and Miorine's marriage was objectively confirmed both in the anime's final scene and by the characters' voice actors in an audio commentary for the final episode or official final stream after that, and as such no room for "interpretation" exists.

The wedding itself was not depicted on-screen, but the characters are shown wearing rings in the final scene of the series, and Suletta's sister Ericht refers to herself as Miorine's sister-in-law. The September 2023 issues of the Animage and Animedia magazines published on August 9 provided Mamiko Noto and Lynn's interpretations of the scene as Ericht behaving like an in-law. The queer commentary led to mixed reactions to Polygon as he believed that while it is obvious the two are romanticall involved, it can be left to the viewer's interpretation. Espinof noted the negative backlash to such censorship. According to a writer at Automation, the anime's North American Twitter account confirmed that Suletta Mercury and Miorine Rembran married after the end of the anime, but Japanese sources did not do so. The fact that Japanese sources did not confirm whether Suletta and Miorine married displeased Japanese users. Stephanie Liu of Siliconera wrote that the director said Suletta and Miorine are married, even though Bandai Namco omitted this conclusion and apologized for keeping it previously in December 2023. Kana Ichinose speculated the characters were married to each other in a same-sex marriage, and the director later confirmed it.
