= List of Mobile Suit Gundam: The Witch from Mercury characters =

This is a list of fictional characters from the Japanese anime series Mobile Suit Gundam: The Witch from Mercury.

== Main characters ==
Suletta Mercury (スレッタ・マーキュリー, Suretta Mākyurī)

Voiced by: Kana Ichinose (Japanese); Jill Harris (English)
The series's main protagonist. Suletta, a 17-year-old female Spacian and a second-year student in the piloting department representing Shin Sei Development Corporation, who transferred to the Asticassia School of Technology from Mercury. At Mercury, she was trained to be a mobile suit pilot from a young age and was later sent to the academy by her mother, Prospera Mercury, as part of a bigger revenge scheme against Delling Rembran, the CEO of the Benerit Group. She is shown to be a timid girl who has trouble communicating with people other than her mother; she also has a pathological need to be useful, both towards her housemates and her fiancée Miorine. Despite being a Spacian, she becomes affiliated with the Earth House. As the series progresses, Miorine becomes increasingly conspicuous and egregious on how Suletta is manipulated by Prospera, whose sway over her daughter is so great that she can command her to do anything from abandoning her dreams to committing cold-blooded murder. In the second season, she loses in a duel for the first time after a serious fight with mentally broken Guel and the intervention of Miorine, who betrays her in exchange for the opportunity to free Suletta from participating in her mother's cruel plans. Ultimately, the girl meets the spirit of the real Ericht in Aerial, where she reveals the secret of Suletta's origin as her clone and finally lost her connection with her and their mother. Following the events on Prospera's attack on Earth and the Dominicus raid on the academy, she fully found her resolve to correct things that she had done wrong. Following the Quiet Zero Incident, her body is starting to feel the side effects of the Data Storm infection done while piloting the Gundam Calibarn but she persevered further and unlocked the highest Permet Score ever done, stopping the Space Assembly League from firing the ILTS while giving time for Miorine to disband the Benerit Group and dissolve and sell all of its assets. 3 years after the incident, she is now married to Miorine while ongoing rehabilitation due to the strains on piloting the Gundam.
Suletta pilots the XVX-016 Gundam Aerial, a GUND-Format mobile suit developed by the Shin Sei Development Corporation on Mercury. Its main feature are the "Bit Staves", remote controlled drones that can be used both for offense and defense. It is later upgraded into the XVX-016RN Gundam Aerial Rebuild, which has extra thrusters for improved mobility as well as a new rifle that can combine with the Bit Staves to form a large cannon. Following the reveal of Prospera's true intentions and the discovery that Aerial contains the mind and biological code of Ericht Samaya, her formerly deceased eldest daughter, the Space Assembly League assigned Suletta to pilot the X-EX01 Gundam Calibarn, a prototype GUND-Format mobile suit developed by the Vanadis Institute and Ochs-Earth and was confiscated by the organization following the incident 21 years ago. People in the institute described the mobile suit as a "monster" due to its lack of Permet Code filtering needed to weather out data storms. It uses a broom-like propulsion unit that doubles as a beam rifle.
Miorine Rembran (ミオリネ・レンブラン, Miorine Renburan)
Voiced by: Lynn (Japanese); Natalie Van Sistine (English)
An attractive and academically distinguished second-year female Spacian student in the management strategy department. Miorine is the only daughter of Delling Rembran, the president of the Benerit Group and chairman of the school's board. Her late mother was a botanist, and Miorine kept a small greenhouse on school grounds in her memory. She has a strong rebellious feeling towards her father, who barely acknowledges her beyond her status as his family. Following the Plant Quetta incident, she became the temporarily CEO of the Benerit Group while her father is recovering from his wounds. After becoming engaged to Suletta when the latter wins the Holder title from Guel Jeturk, Miorine slowly but surely grows closer to her new fiancée, as they help each other become stronger and learn not to run away from their problems. Miorine even founds the Gund-Arm Inc. company for Suletta's sake, as a way to keep her Gundam Aerial safe from the Benerit Group's laws which outlaw Gundams. However, after discovering firsthand just how much Suletta was manipulated by her mother, Miorine is coerced into a deal with the latter to keep her from using Suletta as a pawn in her revenge scheme; this deal requires Miorine and Guel to cruelly wrest away both Aerial and the Holder title from Suletta, which they do with heavy hearts. However after Prospera's attack on Earth, she soon realized she is being used by her to advance her plans on Quiet Zero, blaming herself on her lack of reason. At the end of the Quiet Zero Incident, she announced to the Space Assembly League that she will be disbanding the Benerit Group and all of its assets were both dissolved and sold in order to end the conflict between Spacians and Earthians.

== Recurring characters ==
=== Asticassia School of Technology ===
A higher-education facility run by the Benerit Group. It is made up of specialized piloting, mechanical, and management strategy departments. A recommendation from a company affiliated with the Benerit Group is a prerequisite for admission

Guel Jeturk (グエル・ジェターク, Gueru Jetāku)
Voiced by: Yōhei Azakami (Japanese); Bradley Gareth (English)
An heir to Jeturk Heavy Machinery, one of the group's three branches, and a third-year student in the piloting department. First appearing in story as an arrogant, morbidly impulsive and abusive egoist, Guel subsequently endures a series of humiliations and tragedies that turn him into a sensitive and compassionate individual. As the ace pilot of Jeturk House, he had absolute confidence in his own skills, including the rank of "Holder" to signify his status as the top duelist at the school, which makes him Miorine's fiancé, a position he loses to Suletta after he is defeated by her. After knowing more about Suletta, Guel becomes infatuated with her, to the point of asking her in marriage. Due to his repeated defeats, he was kicked out of the Jeturk House, now living solely away from the group. He soon left the academy and joined a private company as a worker under the pseudonym of "Bob" until he was captured by the Dawn of Fold during the Plant Quetta incident and was held hostage. It was only until after the Benerit Group's raid on the Dawn of Fold hideout that he's allowed to go free, with his priority is to go back to space to redeem himself and save his late father's company, taking over as CEO. Upon his return, he along with Miorine devise a plan to free Suletta from her mother's control. This culminates in a Duel, where he wins, albeit heavily scarred and his Mobile Suit damaged. He later accompanies Miorine to Earth for negotiations with the Earthians, where he reunites with Sedo, an orphan whom he befriended during his time as a prisoner, who discloses incriminating evidence on Shaddiq's role in the actions of the Dawn of Fold. Enraged, he along with Kenanji return to space, where he fights against a ruthless Shaddiq, narrowly defeating him in the process, while losing the Darilbalde in the process. When escorting the Dominicus team to Quiet Zero, he is ambushed by a vengeful Lauda, ending in his Dilanza being stabbed in the reactor. Guel narrowly avoids death thanks to the quick thinking of Felsi Rollo, who used a immobilizing gel gun to stop the Mobile Suit from exploding. Three years later, Guel remains the CEO of the Jeturk Company, with the original Elan Ceres as his subordinate.
Guel initially pilots the MD-0032G Guel's Dilanza, a heavily modified Dilanza developed by the Jeturk Heavy Machinery and used primarily for close combat. He later switches to the more powerful MD-0064 Darilbalde, also focusing on close combat with the aid of an experimental Artificial intelligence system. After its debut duel with the Aerial, it is rebuilt with larger shields, a beam firearm, as well as another pair of Ambika drones.
Elan Ceres (エラン・ケレス, Eran Keresu)
Voiced by: Natsuki Hanae (Japanese); Aaron Dismuke (English)
The top pilot backed by Peil Technologies, one of the group's three branches and a third-year student in the piloting department. In reality, Elan's attendance in school and participation in duels is secretly performed by Enhanced Persons, unregistered body doubles created to handle the stresses of the GUND-Format technology. These Enhanced Persons are all modeled in the image of the original Elan Ceres, the next CEO selected by the Peil Grade, an Artificial Intelligence grading system that automatically selects the most capable leader. He oversees the body doubles in his behalf and all of them share the same pseudonym, due to the original Elan Ceres' abysmal piloting skills. The first enhanced person, code-named "Number 4", is a taciturn and solitary person, who does not open his heart to anyone in school. He has an interest in Suletta due to her relation to the GUND Format tech. After his defeat against her, he was killed by Peil Technologies for failing to secure the Aerial. He was replaced by "Number 5", another double who was ordered by Peil Technologies to seduce Suletta in order to gain access to the Aerial. Unlike Number 4, he is more outgoing and talkative, but more manipulative, even coming across as rather "frightening" to Suletta. As he became more and more desperate in securing the Aerial, he attempts to hijack it, only to be met with a painful data storm, along with the digitized ghost of Ericht kicking him out of the cockpit. This culminates in Number 5 physically assaulting Suletta, only to be warded off by Guel Jeturk. He was fully disowned by Peil Technologies afterwards and blackmailed Grassely House to hide him due to his knowledge of the Rumble Ring Incident, along with Norea and Nika. He later falls in love with Norea, which is tragically cut short by her death. Following this, "Number 5" decided to ally himself with Suletta, apologizing in the process for his previous behavior. During the Quiet Zero Incident, he accompanies Miorine and the rest of Earth House in their infiltration of the fortress. He later defends his former handler, Belmeria, by shooting Prospera multiple times. Three years following Norea's death, he began traveling around Earth to find the various places that she drew in her book.
All of the Elan clones pilot the FP/A-77 Gundam Pharact, a long-ranged sniper unit developed by Peil Technologies using GUND-Format technology that uses Corax GUND-BITs that stun mobile suits. The fifth Elan later piloted the EDM-GA-01 Gundam Lfrith Ur during the Dominicus Raid to stop Norea from destroying the academy but to no avail.
Shaddiq Zenelli (シャディク・ゼネリ, Shadiku Zeneri)
Voiced by: Makoto Furukawa (Japanese); Alejandro Saab (English)
Real name "Jeru Ogul" (イエル・オグル, Ieru Oguru), Shaddiq is an adopted child of the CEO of Grassley Defense Systems, one of the group's three branches who leads Grassley House. Although still a third-year student in the piloting department, Shaddiq has shown his skills in business and is a candidate for next generation executive. He was originally a Half-Earthian until he was taken in by Sarius. Later in the series, it is revealed he orchestrated the attacks on both Plant Quetta and the Rumble Ring, the later allowing him to elevate him to CEO position of the company while keeping his adopted father hostage deep inside Grassley House. He is soon captured by Dominicus alongside other members of the Grassley House in a heated battle against Guel.
He pilots the CFK-029 Michaelis, a mobile suit developed by Grassley Defense Systems as a successor to the Beguir-Beu equipped with the Beam Bracer, which uses Non-Kinetic Efectors to disable GUND-Format type mobile suits with a Permet score of 3 or lower. In the later episodes, the unit is equipped with a wire-guided lance for close combat.
Nika Nanaura (ニカ・ナナウラ)
Voiced by: Yume Miyamoto (episodes 1–9, episode 13–onwards), Haruka Shiraishi (episodes 10–12) (Japanese); Bryn Apprill (English)
An Earthian second year student in the Mechanics department born on Earth, was originally an orphan. She welcomes Suletta into the Earth House and convinces the other members to accept her, but also works in the shadows with Shaddiq under orders from Dawn of Fold. Following the Rumble Ring incident, she was captured by the Grassley House when she is about to turn herself in to authorities over her involvement on the Plant Quetta incident. She later escaped Grassley's custody during the Dominicus raid and is reunited with the rest of Earth House. After the Quiet Zero Incident, Nika spends three years in prison for her role in the Plant Quetta Incident, where upon her release, she is reunited once again with the now-former members of Earth House.
Chuatury Panlunch (チュアチュリー・パンランチ, Chuachurī Panranchi)
Voiced by: Miyu Tomita (Japanese); Brittney Karbowski (English)
A first-year Earthian student representing Earth House, a group that represents Earthian workers. Nicknamed "Chuchu", she has a gruff personality and reacts aggressively to Spacians who discriminate against Earthians, sometimes getting into physical fights.
She pilots the MSJ-105CC Demi Trainer Chuchu Custom as her main mobile suit, equipped with a sniper rifle for ranged combat. After the unit was destroyed during the Dominicus raid on the academy, she received the MSJ-R122 Demi-Barding, a unit developed by the Burion Company meant for general purpose combat. It is equipped with a wire-guided backpack unit that can operate without the use of Permet Links.
Secelia Dote (セセリア・ドート, Seseria Dōto)
Voiced by: Aya Yamane (Japanese); Cassie Ewulu (English)
A second-year student in the management strategy department, who belongs to Burion House and a member of the Dueling Committee. Known for making sarcastic and snide remarks to the other members of the Dueling Committee.
Rouji Chante (ロウジ・チャンテ, Rouji Chante)
Voiced by: Gen Satō (Japanese); Kristin Payne (English)
A a first-year student in the mechanical department, who belongs to Burion House and a member of the Dueling Committee. He is rather shy and is mostly seen with his pet Haro robot.

==== Earth House / GUND-ARM INC. ====
A dormitory group composed of Earthian students, in which both Nika and ChuChu belonged. Later in the series, the group became part of the company managed by the Benerit Group named GUND-ARM INC. that focuses on the development of GUND technology for medical purposes.

Martin Upmont (マルタン・アップモント, Marutan Appumonto)
Voiced by: Junya Enoki (Japanese); Matt Shipman (English)
A third-year management strategy student and the leader of the Earth House. He is a rather unreliable and cowardly house leader, by having trouble controlling the behavior of his fellow Earthian students. Despite this, he deeply cares about them, going out of his way to support and comfort them during any difficult times.
Nuno Kargan (ヌーノ・カルガン, Nūno Karugan)
Voiced by: Tasuku Hatanaka (Japanese); Eric Vale (English)
A second-year mechanical department student belonging to the Earth House who has a solid knowledge on computing software. He is friends with Ojelo Gabel.
Ojelo Gabel (オジェロ・ギャベル, Ojero Gyaberu)
Voiced by: KENN (Japanese); Corey Wilder (English)
A second-year mechanical department student belonging to the Earth House. He enjoys betting heavily on school duels. He is friends with Nuno Kargan.
Till Nys (ティル・ネイス, Tiru Neisu)
Voiced by: Kōhei Amasaki (Japanese); Monty Thompson (English)
A third-year mechanical department student belonging to the Earth House. Unlike the other members of Earth House, Till is a quiet and reserved individual, often working behind the scenes to help his house.
Lilique Kadoka Lipati (リリッケ・カドカ・リパティ, Ririkke Kadoka Ripati)
Voiced by: Konomi Inagaki (Japanese); Sara Ragsdale (English)
A first-year management strategy student belonging to the Earth House. She is popular with the male students of Asticassia.
Aliya Mahvash (アリヤ・マフヴァーシュ, Ariya Mafuvāshu)
Voiced by: Miyuri Shimabukuro (Japanese); E.A Castillo (English)
A third-year mechanical department student belonging to the Earth House. She has an interest in divination and is one of the more level-handed members of the house.

==== Jeturk House ====
A dormitory group composed of students loyal to Jeturk Heavy Machinery, which most of the students being the children of Jeturk employees.

Lauda Neill (ラウダ・ニール, Rauda Nīru)
Voiced by: Takeo Ōtsuka (Japanese); Nazeeh Tarsha (English)
Guel's younger half brother and current heir of Jeturk Heavy Machinery. Unlike his brother's initial hot-blooded and aggressive personality, he was calm and collected, often being the more reasonable brother. After Guel was kicked out of the group, the academy appointed him as the next successor to the company while overseeing duels. He later took over the company after the death of Vim Jeturk, though the burden of running it pushed him to exhaustion until Guel returned to the Academy. Lauda is shown to love and care deeply for his older brother so much that he quickly develops a dislike for Suletta and reminds those around him regularly, apparently not caring that due to Guel's demotion, he has taken the lead in the house. He then soon learned about the death of their father during the Dominicus raid and soon plans to assassinate Miorne, blaming her for all the misfortune that befell their family.
Lauda pilots the MD-0031L Lauda's Dilanza, a customized Dilanza unit armed with a large twin-axe halberd for close combat. He later pilots the MDX-0003 Gundam Schwarzette; a GUND-Format type mobile suit equipped with a large mace that doubles as a long-ranged beam machine gun and can transform into six Bit Staves and beam sword when its Permet Score reaches 3.
Petra Itta (ペトラ・イッタ, Petora Itta)
Voiced by: Yuuki Hirose (Japanese); Kimberly Grace (English)
A second-year student in the mechanical department. Loyal to Guel, she resents Suletta for causing his downfall from Jeturk House. Lauda's trusted secretary and love interest, the two started dating after Guel's return. She was critically injured during the Dominicus raid in the academy while she and Suletta were escaping the school alongside other students. Three years after the raid, her right leg was amputated and replaced with a GUND prosthetic.
Felsi Rollo (フェルシー・ロロ, Ferushī Roro)
Voiced by: Yūki Takada (Japanese); Alexis Tipton (English)
A second-year student and mobile suit pilot. Like Petra, she resents Suletta for causing Guel's downfall. She is rather uncomfortable with Earthians, going against odds with Earth House pilot Chuchu several times, but the animosity morphed into a friendship upon her saving both her and Lauda's life in the Rumble Ring Incident. She later intervened in a battle between Lauda and Guel, shooting an immobilizing gel at Guel's damaged Dilanza, saving his life.
Felsi pilots the MD-0031 Dilanza, which is the main mass-production Mobile Suit of the Jeturk Company.

==== Grassley House ====
A dormitory group composed of students loyal to Grassley Defense Systems, which most of the students being the children of Grassley employees.

Sabina Fardin (サビーナ・ファルディン, Sabīna Farudin)
Voiced by: Asami Seto (Japanese); Katelyn Barr (English)
A third-year mobile suit pilot and Shaddiq's right-hand woman, despite being an Earthian. As the most experienced and loyal pilot to him, Sabina leads their squad directly into battle. She is very popular among female students even more than male students. She pilots the CEK-077 Beguir-Pente, a mass production variant of the Beguir-Beu equipped with a Non-Kinetic Shield, which is used to disable GUND-Format type mobile suits with a Permet score of 3 or lower. During the Rumble Ring Incident, she pilots the CFP-010 Heindree, the main mass-production unit of Grassley Defense Systems, along with Renee Costa.
Henao Jazz (エナオ・ジャズ, Enao Jazu)
Voiced by: Shion Wakayama (Japanese); Sarah Wiedenheft (English)
A mysterious third-year mobile suit pilot in Grassley House.
Ireesha Plano (イリーシャ・プラノ, Irīsha Purano)
Voiced by: Ryōko Maekawa (Japanese); Celeste Perez (English)
A timid second-year mobile suit pilot in Grassley House.
Maisie May (メイジー・メイ, Meijī Mei)
Voiced by: Yuka Nukui (Japanese); Dani Chambers (English)
A cheerful second-year mobile suit pilot in Grassley House.
Renee Costa (レネ・コスタ, Rene Kosuta)
Voiced by: Sayumi Suzushiro (Japanese); Brittany Lauda (English)
A second-year mobile suit pilot in Grassley House who is very popular with boys. She develops a rivalry with Lilique after one of her "back-up boyfriends" ask the latter out. During the Rumble Ring Incident, she pilots the CFP-010 Heindree, the main mass-production unit of Grassley Defense Systems, along with Sabina Fardin.

=== Benerit Group ===
The Benerit Group (ベネリットグループ, Beneritto Gurūpu) is a Mega-Cooperation Military major business conglomerate of 157 corporations in mobile suit manufacturing led by CEO Delling Rembran. They are the leader in mobile suit industry, making them the most powerful corporations throughout known space who also wields much authority on Earth. However, for much of that authority, they oppress Earthians, deploying their personal mobile suits to disrupt protests of said Earthians against exploitations by Spacians.

==== Cathedra ====
One organization under the umbrella of protection the Mobile Suit Development Council.

Delling Rembran (デリング・レンブラン, Deringu Renburan)
Voiced by: Naoya Uchida (Japanese); Gabe Kunda (English)
The supervising representative of Cathedra and CEO of Benerit Group, Delling is a former military man who used his influence to plan and order a raid on the Fólkvangr lab where the "GUND Format" technology was being developed, to stop the research before it was finished and the Ochs Earth Corporation along with it. Many years later, Delling became the president of the Benerit Group. In addition, Delling created the Asticassia School of Technology, both to solidify his influence and train the next generation of elites. Delling's Darwinian philosophy that only the strong deserve to survive extends to the policies of his business, his school, and even his own daughter, declaring that only the strongest mobile suit pilot is worthy of marrying her. During the Plant Quetta Incident, Delling helped protect his daughter from an attack, resulting in him being critically injured and comatose. He later awakens during the Quiet Zero Incident, where he became more forgiving towards Miorine upon her election as the CEO of the Benerit Group.

==== Jeturk Heavy Machinery ====
Jeturk Heavy Machinery (ジェターク・ヘビー・マシーナリー, Jetāku Hebī Mashīnarī) is a corporation and one of three branches of the Benerit Group led by Vim Jeturk.

Vim Jeturk (ヴィム・ジェターク, Vimu Jetāku)
Voiced by: Tetsuo Kanao (Japanese); Christopher Sabat (English)
The CEO of Jeturk Heavy Machinery, and father to Guel and Lauda. He's an ambitious person who sees Delling as a thorn to his personal agenda, especially his philosophies. During the Plant Quetta Incident, he was accidentally and brutally killed by Guel in self-defense while piloting a MD-0031UL Dilanza Sol, despite learning about their identities a bit too late.

==== Grassley Defense Systems ====
Grassley Defense Systems (グラスレー・ディフェンス・システムズ, Gurasurē Difensu Shisutemuzu) is a corporation and one of three branches of the Benerit Group led by Sarius Zenelli.

Sarius Zenelli (サリウス・ゼネリ, Sariusu Zeneri)
Voiced by: Atsushi Ono (Japanese); Mike Smith (English)
The CEO of Grassley Defense Systems, and Shaddiq's adoptive father. During the Rumble Ring Incident, Shaddiq betrayed his step-father, by having his faction abduct him, in order to appease the Space Assembly League. He is later freed from captivity after Shaddiq's arrest.

==== Peil Technologies ====
Peil Technologies (ペイル・テクノロジーズ, Peiru Tekunorojīzu) is a corporation and one of three branches of the Benerit Group led by a team of four CEOs who manage the company via a parliamentary system. Following the Dominicus Raid, the company separated itself from the Benerit Group and allied itself with the Space Assembly League after the events that unfolded.

Nugen (ニューゲン, Nyūgen)
Voiced by: Masako Katsuki (Japanese); Wendy Powell (English)
One of the four co-CEOs of Peil Technologies.
Kal (カル, Karu)
Voiced by: Kazue Komiya (Japanese); Kristen McGuire (English)
One of the four co-CEOs of Peil Technologies.
Nevola (ネボラ, Nebora)
Voiced by: Yoko Soumi (Japanese); Brianna Roberts (English)
One of the four co-CEOs of Peil Technologies.
Golneri (ゴルネリ, Goruneri)
Voiced by: Kimiko Saito (Japanese); Molly Searcy (English)
One of the four co-CEOs of Peil Technologies.
Belmeria Winston (ベルメリア・ウィンストン, Berumeria Uinsuton)
Voiced by: Ayumi Tsunematsu (Japanese); Anastasia Munoz (English)
An employee of Peil Technologies and a former member of Vanadis Institute. Belmeria was the handler of Elan Ceres and his doubles. Following Enhanced Person 4's loss to Suletta, she pleaded with the Peil CEOs to spare him, to no avail. She is later assigned to Gund-Arm Inc. as their liaison with Peil Technologies. She is then interrogated by the two agents of the Space Assembly League, confessing to them about Prospera's plans and would make amends on her involvement to her agenda.

==== Dominicus ====
A Special Force by founded Mobile Suit Development Council for to hunting the witch relative-Technology with many deploying Grassley Company Mobile Suit.

Kenanji Avery (ケナンジ・アベリー, Kenanji Aberī)
Voiced by: Yōji Ueda (Japanese); Brandon Acosta (English)
A pilot stationed in the group's Dominicus special forces squad. He was among the soldiers who raided the Fólkvangr lab. 21 years after the Vanadis incident, he had become a ship captain at Dominicus and gained weight.
Kenanji piloted the CEK-040 Beguir-Beu, a mobile suit developed by Grassley Defense Systems armed with remote-controlled pods which disable mobile suits using GUND Format systems. Later in his older years, he pilots a customized CEK-077 Beguir-Pente.

=== Vanadis Institute / Ochs Earth ===
The inventors of the GUND-Format. While initially meant for medical purposes, after being acquired by arms developer Ochs Earth, the institute was forced to shift to using the technology to develop Mobile Suits, creating the Gundams.

Elnora Samaya (エルノラ・サマヤ, Erunora Samaya) / Prospera Mercury (プロスぺラ・マーキュリー, Purosupera Mākyurī)
Voiced by: Mamiko Noto (Japanese); Elizabeth Maxwell (English)
The series's main antagonist. Suletta and Ericht's mother and a test pilot employed by Ochs Earth, a company that researched and developed the GUND-Format technology for use in Mobile Suits. In the past, she had a GUND right arm transplanted by Cardo in order to save her life. Following the Vanadis Incident, she escaped the destruction of the institute and went into hiding. Years after the incident, she joined Shin Sei Development Corporation on Mercury in order to continue development on the GUND-Format and was eventually appointed as their president. She also went under an alias as well, as she dons a mask to hide her true identity as Lady Prospera. Her true motives however is vengeance against Delling's decision to murder the people involved in the GUND-Format technology during the Vanadis Incident and use Quiet Zero as part of her revenge plan.
Elnora herself test piloted the XGF-02 Gundam Lfrith, a GUND-Format Mobile Suit developed by the institute. However, Elnora wasn't able to activate it until its Permet Code was connected to Ericht. Years later, she took over Suletta as the main pilot of the XVX-016RN Gundam Aerial Rebuild when she wanted her not to be involved in their plans. Later on, she commands the Quiet Zero; a project built by both the Benerit Group and the Shin Sei Development Company created as a large mobile fortress and GUND-Format Terminal which can sync with the Gundam Aerial Rebuild when its Permet Score reaches 6 to 8, effectively disabling enemy ships and mobile suits that uses Permet while commanding various unmanned mobile suits named XGF-E3 Gundnode for offensive and defensive capabilities.
Ericht Samaya (エリクト・サマヤ, Erikuto Samaya)
Voiced by: Kana Ichinose (Japanese); Sarah Wiedenheft (English)
Ericht is the first daughter of Prospera Mercury and "older sister" of Suletta Mercury. On her fourth birthday, just prior to the Vanadis Incident, she registered her vital signs on the Gundam Lfrith, accidentally clearing Layer 33 of its GUND-Format, which allowed her and her mother to escape the slaughter during the Vanadis Incident. By AS 122, Ericht was given a new body in the form of the XVX-016 Gundam Aerial, allegedly as a way to save her from the hazards of outer space. Elnora later began cloning her, producing several clones, all of who were integrated as the GUND-BITs of the Aerial, with the exception of Suletta. She controls the mobile suit's GUND-Bits and weathers the data storm in place of Suletta, allowing for spectacular feats with the GUND-Format that do not harm her pilot like a normal Gundam would. However, Ericht has little direct control over the Aerial itself, and her voice can mostly only be heard by Suletta; Prospera's ambition to complete Quiet Zero is partially driven by a desire to grant Ericht "freedom" from this predicament. At the battle in Quiet Zero, Ericht used the Aerial and several Gundnodes by shielding an incoming Solar Laser blast fired by the ILTS, almost destroying the Mobile Suit. Ericht survived the blast, albeit with the Aerial Rebuild severely damaged. Suletta then used the remains of the Aerial Rebuild, the Pharact and the Schwarzette to create a massive data storm, resulting in the complete disintegration of all nearby Mobile Weapons that used the GUND Format. Ericht was able to survive, by transferring her consciousness into a keychain. Three years after the Quiet Zero Incident, Ericht remains as a keychain, reunited with her family.
Nadim Samaya (ナディム・サマヤ, Nadimu Samaya)
Voiced by: Hiroshi Tsuchida (Japanese); Chris Guerrero (English)
Ericht's father who sacrificed himself to give Elnora and Ericht a chance to escape. He piloted the XGF-01 Gundam Lfrith Pre-Production Model, the intended mass-production version of the Gundam Lfrith piloted by Elnora.
Cardo Nabo (カルド・ナボ, Karudo Nabo)
Voiced by: Miyuki Ichijo (Japanese); Laurie Steele (English)
The inventor of GUND Format technology, she was one of the biggest proponents of Gundam development to aid space exploration and developed the Gundam Lfrith. She is killed when Fólkvangr is raided by Cathedra.
Nyla Bertran (ナイラ・バートラン, Naira Bātoran)
Voiced by: Sachiko Kojima (Japanese); Nazia Chaudhry (English)
A Vanadis Institute researcher, she served as an operator and participated in the testing of the Gundam Lfrith. Nyla is killed during the Vanadis Incident.
Wendy Olent (ウェンディ・オレント, Uendi Orento)
Voiced by: Yō Taichi (Japanese); Krystal LaPorte (English)
A Vanadis Institute researcher, she was Elnora's junior as a test pilot, and a close friend of Nyla. She attempts to avenge her friend Nyla during the Vanadis Incident only to be killed by Kenanji.

=== Dawn of Fold ===
An Earth-based resistance organization that aims to end the Benerit Group's rule over Earth.

Sophie Pulone (ソフィ・プロネ, Sofi Purone)
Voiced by: Shiori Izawa (Japanese); Emi Lo (English)
A Gundam pilot and member of Dawn of Fold. She has a rather sadistic and blood-thirsty personality but usually cheerful, in comparison to Norea. She admires Suletta and will do anything to make Suletta her big sister, wanting to have a family and an ordinary life of her own. During the Rumble Ring incident in which the Dawn of Fold launched a terrorist attack on the school, she fought Suletta, only to be killed by going to Permit score 6 to counter an intense data storm caused by Ericht in the Gundam Aerial.
Sophie pilots the EDM-GA-01 Gundam Lfrith Ur, a customized Gundam Lfrith Pre-Production Type developed by Ochs Earth under the supervision of the Space Assembly League which focuses on assault combat and equipped with GUND-Format technology that allows it to control several unmanned mobile suits named EDM-GB Gundvölva when it activates Permet Score 3.
Norea Du Noc (ノレア・デュノク, Norea Deyunoku)
Voiced by: Aoi Yūki (Japanese); Megan Shipman (English)
A Gundam pilot and member of Dawn of Fold. She hates Spacians for ruining Earth and leaving its inhabitants poor and powerless. On the surface, she is a cold and quiet individual, but upon the death of Sophie and later the massacre of Quinharbor, Norea underwent a drastic shift in personality, being more prone to violence as well as weakening her already-weak mental state. During the Dominicus raid on the school, she goes on a rampage with the Thorn, mercilessly killing innocent students to satiate her rage. Elan 5 later arrives to calm her down, only for a Dominicus sniper to shoot the Thorn's cockpit down while she was distracted, instantly killing Norea in the process.
Norea piloted of the EDM-GA-02 Gundam Lfrith Thorn, a customized Gundam Lfrith Pre-Production Type developed by Ochs Earth under the supervision of the Space Assembly League which focuses on ranged support combat, also equipped with GUND-Format technology that allows it to control several Gundvölvas when it activates Permet Score 3.
Naji Geor Hija (ナジ・ゲオル・ヒジャ, Naji Georu Hija)
Voiced by: Taiten Kusunoki (Japanese); Ray Hurd (English)
The leader of Dawn of Fold.
Olcott (オルコット, Orukotto)
Voiced by: Satoshi Mikami (Japanese); Michael Stimac (English)
Naji's second in command. He was a former Dominicus special forces pilot but defected to Dawn of Fold after his son was killed.

=== Space Assembly League ===
Military Congress organization that serves as an administrative body that mediates political problems along the frontiers of space.

Feng Jun (フェン・ジュン, Fen Jun)
Voiced by: Akeno Watanabe (Japanese); Julie Cleburn (English)
Feng is an agent working for the Space Assembly League, a coalition group that spies on corporate activities within both Earth and Space. She alongside Guston both work undercover as smugglers, but she is shown to have her own agenda that differs from that of her superiors. After Belmeria confessed to her regarding Quiet Zero and everything related to it is in Plant Quetta, she was shot and killed by Godoy Haimano, one of Prospera's confidants before she can allow Belmeria and Guston to escape unharmed.
Guston Parche (グストン・パーチェ, Gusuton Pāche)
Voiced by: Junichi Yanagita (Japanese); Van Barr Jr (English)
Feng's accomplice and member of the Space Assembly League. Like her, he also works undercover as a smuggler and shown to have his own agenda like her. Following Feng's death and his escape to Plant Quetta alongside Belmeria, they soon return to the academy to convince Suletta to stop her mother's plans regarding Quiet Zero.
