= BIN (band) =

Japanese rock band

- Origin: Osaka, Japan
- Genres: J-pop; rock
- Years active: 2019–2024
- Labels: Pony Canyon
- Members: Yama; Tomato; T

YouTube information
- Channel: BIN official
- Years active: 2019–2024
- Subscribers: 253 thousand
- Views: 44 million
- Last updated: November 14, 2025

BIN is a Japanese music group consisting of three members: Yamagami (vocalist), Tomato (illustrator; mainly known as WOOMA), and T (producer). They are signed to the record label Pony Canyon.

== Overview ==
On March 16, 2019, the group appeared on the internet music scene with the release of the MV for their first single「チルドレン」(Children) on YouTube. On February 10, 2020, the single「灰」(Ash) was released exclusively on CD for Tower Records. It has five songs. In November of the same year it was chosen as one of four groups that Tower Records was promoting for a month under their project タワレコメン (Tawarekomen), which is a portmanteau of the words タワー (tower) and レコメンド (recommend). On March 24, 2021, their first album "COLONY" was released, On February 28, 2021, their first album "Melt".

== Discography ==
=== Streaming/download singles ===
#	Release date	Title	Ref(s)
1st	May 13, 2020	チルドレン	
1st	May 13, 2020	NEON	
1st	May 13, 2020	インスタント	
1st	May 13, 2020	悪食	
1st	May 13, 2020	龍の鳥	
2nd	June 3, 2020	シニカル	
3rd	August 26, 2020	因果	
4th	November 18, 2020	灰燼	
5th	September 13, 2022	melt	
6th	December 28, 2022	シュシュタイト	
7th	April 20, 2023	朔の贄	
8th	October 18, 2023	Hollow	
9th	December 20, 2023	ハイウェイローナー	

=== CD single ===
#	Release date	Title	Form	Songs
1st	February 10, 2020	灰	CD	1.灰燼; 2.鬼哭; 3.4; 4.CAERULA; 5.灰燼 (Instrumental)

=== Full Album ===
#	Release date	Title	Songs	Highest rank	Ref(s)
Pony Canyon
1st	March 24, 2021	COLONY	1. チルドレン; 2. 籠の鳥; 3. 悪食; 4. インスタント; 5. NEON; 6. シニカル; 7. 因果; 8. 灰燼; 9. 遭難信号; 10. colony	43	
2nd	February 28, 2024	Melt	1. melt 2. ハイウェイローナー; 3. さよなら; 4. mood 5. シュシュタイト; 6. 朔の贄; 7. アンハッピーエンド; 8. Hollow; 9. babylon 10. Sybil		
