= 2.43: Seiin High School Boys Volleyball Team =

Japanese light novel and anime series

- First light novel volume cover

2.43 清陰高校男子バレー部 (Nī Ten Yonsan Seiin Kōkō Danshi Barē-bu)
- Genre: Sports
- Light novel
- Written by: Yukako Kabei
- Illustrated by: Aiji Yamakawa
- Published by: Shueisha
- Imprint: Shueisha Bunko
- Original run: March 2015 – present
- Volumes: 6
- Manga
- Illustrated by: Aiji Yamakawa
- Published by: Shueisha
- Magazine: Cocohana
- Original run: July 2018 – September 2018
- Anime television series
- Directed by: Yasuhiro Kimura
- Written by: Yōsuke Kuroda
- Music by: Yugo Kanno
- Studio: David Production
- Licensed by: Crunchyroll
- Original network: Fuji TV (NoitaminA)
- English network: US: Crunchyroll Channel
- Original run: January 8, 2021 – March 26, 2021
- Episodes: 12
- icon

2.43: Seiin High School Boys Volleyball Team (Japanese: 2.43 清陰高校男子バレー部, Hepburn: Nī Ten Yonsan Seiin Kōkō Danshi Barē-bu) is a Japanese volleyball light novel series written by Yukako Kabei and illustrated by Aiji Yamakawa. Shueisha have published five volumes in three seasons since March 2015 under their Shueisha Bunko imprint. A manga adaptation with art by Yamakawa has been serialized in Shueisha's josei manga magazine Cocohana from July to September 2018. An anime television series adaptation produced by David Production aired from January to March 2021, on the NoitaminA block.

"2.43" refers to the height of the net for male volleyball, 2.43 m.

== Plot ==
Kimichika Haijima, a talented setter, transfers from Tokyo back to his childhood hometown in Fukui after causing an incident with his former middle school volleyball team. He reunites with his childhood friend Yuni Kuroba, a physically gifted player with strong jumping ability but performs poorly under pressure. The two play together in middle school, but after Kuroba collapses under pressure during a crucial tournament match, a conflict forms between them and they become estranged.

Both later enroll at Seiin High School and join the boys' volleyball team, where they are reunited alongside teammates including the determined captain Shinichirou Oda and the tall vice-captain Misao Aoki. As the team trains and competes in prefectural tournaments, Haijima works to rebuild his partnership with Kuroba and help him overcome his mental weaknesses so he can become the team's ace. Together, the Seiin team aims to defeat the dominant teams in Fukui Prefecture and qualify for the Spring High National Tournament.

== Characters ==
Yuni Kuroba (黒羽祐仁, Kuroba Yuni)
Voiced by: Junya Enoki (Japanese); Bryson Baugus (English)
Yuni (or Kuroba his teammates call him) is Kimichika's (Chika's) best friend since kindergarten who was originally upset when his best friend moved back in middle school.
Kimichika Haijima (灰島公誓, Haijima Kimichika)
Voiced by: Kensho Ono (Japanese); Zach Aguilar (English)
Kimichika or Chika is Yuni's best friend since kindergarten. Chika was involved in a scandal at his middle school which caused him to transfer from a prestigious school to the same school as Yuni.
Misao Aoki (青木 操, Aoki Misao)
Voiced by: Yūichirō Umehara (Japanese); Ricco Fajardo (English)
Shinichiro Oda (小田伸一郎, Oda Shinichiro)
Voiced by: Kent Itō (Japanese); Clifford Chapin (English)
Akito Kanno (棺野秋人, Kanno Akito)
Voiced by: Shouta Aoi (Japanese); Khoi Dao (English)
Yusuke Okuma (大隈優介, Okuma Yusuke)
Voiced by: Subaru Kimura (Japanese); Tyson Rinehart (English)
Mimura Subaru (三村統, Subaru Mimura)
Voiced by: Kaito Ishikawa (Japanese); Alejandro Saab (English)
Mitsuomi Ochi (越智光臣, Ochi Mitsuomi)
Voiced by: Kōhei Amasaki (Japanese); Griffin Burns (English)
Naoyasu Uchimura (内村直泰, Uchimura Naoyasu)
Voiced by: Gakuto Kajiwara (Japanese); A.J. Beckles (English)
Kazuma Hakao (外尾一馬, Hakao Kazuma)
Voiced by: Yuu Wakabayashi (Japanese); Matt Shipman (English)
Tomoki Kakegawa (掛川智紀, Kakegawa Tomoki)
Voiced by: Shun Horie (Japanese); Howard Wang (English)
Kohei Tokura (戸倉工兵, Tokura Kōhei)
Voiced by: Genki Okawa (Japanese); Zeno Robinson (English)
Issei Asamatsu (朝松壱成, Asamatsu Issei)
Voiced by: Kaito Takeda (Japanese); Stephen Fu (English)
Keita Yanome (矢野目慶太, Yanome Keita)
Voiced by: Sho Nogami (Japanese); Sean Chiplock (English)
Yūhi Sawatari (猿渡勇飛, Sawatari Yūhi)
Voiced by: Kento Shiraishi (Japanese); David Matranga (English)
Ryūdai Jinno (神野龍大, Jinno Ryūdai)
Voiced by: Takuya Eguchi (Japanese); Aaron Dismuke (English)
Jungo Takasugi (高杉潤五, Takasugi Jungo)
Voiced by: Kenjirō Abegawa (Japanese); Gabe Kunda (English)

== Media ==
=== Light novels ===
No.	Release date	ISBN
1	March 20, 2015	978-4-08-745292-1
2	April 17, 2015	978-4-08-745306-5
3	November 17, 2017	978-4-08-745660-8
4	December 14, 2017	978-4-08-745676-9
5	February 19, 2021	978-4-08-744208-3
6	March 19, 2021	978-4-08-744218-2

=== Anime ===
An anime television series adaptation was announced via Twitter on November 1, 2019. The series is animated by David Production and directed by Yasuhiro Kimura, with Yōsuke Kuroda handling series composition, Yūichi Takahashi designing the characters, and Yugo Kanno composing the music. It aired from January 8 to March 26, 2021, on the NoitaminA programming block. The opening theme song is "Paralysis" (麻痺, "Mahi") performed by yama, and the ending theme song is "Undulation" performed by Sōshi Sakiyama (崎山 蒼志, Sakiyama Sōshi). Funimation licensed the series and streamed it on its website in North America and the British Isles, in Europe through Wakanim, and in Australia and New Zealand through AnimeLab. Following Sony's acquisition of Crunchyroll, the series was moved to Crunchyroll.

No.	Title	Directed by (Note: Information is taken from the ending credits of each episode.)	Written by	Original release date
1	"Childhood Yuni and Chika"; Transliteration: "Shōnen Yuni Chika" (Japanese: 少年ユニチカ)	Kyōhei Suzuki	Yōsuke Kuroda	January 8, 2021 (Note: This episode aired on January 8, 2021 at 1:40 a.m. JST, 45 minutes after the original air time on Fuji TV.)
Kimichika Haijima returns to Monshiro Town after an incident in his old school in Suzuma City. He meets up with his childhood friend Yuni Kuroba. Yuni discovers that Haijima plays Volleyball, and he is a setter. Yuni who also plays volleyball starts to take the game seriously after Haijima reassembles the volleyball team. They decide to go to nationals. Yuni's older cousin stops him from getting involved with Haijima and reveals about the incident in his old school, where because of the pressure of a previous match a kid in the volleyball club attempted suicide and everyone thought it was Haijima's fault because he pressurized him to play better.
2	"The Best and Worst Playmaker"; Transliteration: "Saikō de Saitei no Pureimeikā" (Japanese: 最高で最低のプレイメイカー)	Ayumu Uwano	Yōsuke Kuroda	January 15, 2021
Haijima does not come to school, so Yuni visits him and tells him that he does not mind that incident and trusts Haijima. Haijima feels better. A few months later they participate in the Interhigh tournament. After some time, Yuni feels pressured and is not able to play properly. They win the match, but Haijima insults Yuni and tells him to leave volleyball. Angered, Yuni tells everyone about the incident that night and also badmouths Haijima. The next morning, he doesn't come to the match and then discovers that they lost. Haijimaa reveals that he knows that Yuni told everyone about the incident.
3	"A Dog's Perspective and a Giraffe's Perspective"; Transliteration: "Inu no Mesen to Kirin no Mesen" (Japanese: 犬の目線とキリンの目線)	Shō Sugawara	Yōsuke Kuroda	January 22, 2021
Yuni and Haijima graduate and both join Seiin High School. They enter the boys' volleyball club, but upon learning that Yuni is also there Haijima stops coming. The volleyball team captain Shinichirou Oda and vice-captain and student council member Misao Aoki bring Haijima back during the Club Exchange Program. The whole volleyball club except these three exchange with the baseball club. Oda, who is small in height but can jump high, is impressed by Haijima's set. After the program, Yuni discovers that Haijima is coming to the club, and tells him he wants to play with him more rekindling their friendship.
4	"Higher, Faster, Stronger"; Transliteration: "Takaku, Hayaku, Tsuyoku" (Japanese: 高く、はやく、強く)	Kyōhei Suzuki; Daisuke Tsumagari	Yōsuke Kuroda	January 29, 2021
During their summer camp, Yuusuke Okuma joins the club. During the practice, Haijima insists that Yuni practices only his receives. This gets Yuni frustrated, but is afraid that it can possibly break their friendship once again. During the Interhigh tournament Haijima reveals that Yuni is their ace and secret weapon. this gets Yuni fired up and they win the match. To celebrate Yuni's victory, his cousins Itoko and Yorimichi take him bowling. Yuni irritates Itoko and she hits him. He then discovers that Yorimichi has got into a fight.
5	"Stand By Me"; Transliteration: "Sutando Bai Mī" (Japanese: スタンド・バイ・ミー)	Ayumu Uwano	Yōsuke Kuroda	February 5, 2021
The school finds out about the fight and seeing the mark on Yuni's face where Itoko hit him, they think that he participated in the fight. The volleyball club is told to halt their activities since Yuni refuses to tell where he got that mark. He and Haijima then go to Tokyo to see Haijima's old school. They discover that the kid who "attempted suicide" left the school and that he actually did not attempt it. The incident was just a sick joke by his old classmates to make Haijima "adjust his attitude". Yuni gets angry and shows them a deadly spike, frightening them. Haijima then faints and when he wakes up, he discovers the kid who falsely claimed to have attempted suicide is there to meet him. The two talk and then he leaves. Haijima's old volleyball coach drops them off at the Tokyo Metropolitan Gymnasium. They get a call from Oda that Itoko came to their school revealed the truth and they are allowed to play again.
6	"The Laughing King and Crybaby Jack"; Transliteration: "Warau Kingu to Nakimushi Jakku" (Japanese: 笑うキングと泣き虫ジャック)	Daisuke Tsumagari	Yōsuke Kuroda	February 12, 2021
Fukoho High school, which has the greatest volleyball team in Fukui Prefecture loses a match. Their third-year and ace Subaru Mimiura and manager Mitsuomi Ochi are the brawn and brain of the team. Ochi was a setter but because of an injury he can't play volleyball and becomes the manager. The team learns about Seiin, and how they are improving with their genius setter Haijima. First-year Kouhei Tokura and Ochi go to secretly see their practice, but Tokura gets into a fight with Okuma and Subaru comes to their rescue. He then proposes a practice match which Haijima happily accepts.
7	"The Ruling Hero of the Court"; Transliteration: "Kōto o Suberu Hīrō" (Japanese: コートを統べるヒーロー)	Jun'ichirō Hashiguchi	Yōsuke Kuroda	February 19, 2021
At the practice match between Fukoho and Seiin, both teams take three sets each, though Oda believes Fukoho went easy on Seiin during the three sets they won. Recalling the frequency with which Fukoho hit balls over Oda's reach, Haijima suggests that Uchimura replace Oda if Seiin advances far enough to play Fukoho officially. Haijima receives a call informing him that his grandmother has been hospitalized, and he stays with Yuni for the remainder of the week. Yuni and Haijima discuss family matters, volleyball, and the way Haijima relates to the team. In a post-credits scene, Oda is shown to have taken Haijima's advice regarding the prefect qualifier, listing himself as a reserve player rather than a member of the starting lineup.
8	"Yuni and Chika Re-enter the Battle"; Transliteration: "Yuni Chika, Sai-shutsujin" (Japanese: ユニチカ、再出陣)	Satoshi Ōsedo	Yōsuke Kuroda	February 26, 2021
Seiin and Fukuho both spectate at the Fukui prefecture preliminaries, after which Oda announces the starting lineup for Seiin's first game. With Uchimura's having replaced Oda, Seiin initially pulls ahead, only to lose the first set after Haijima makes a mistake and the team loses focus. With the combined efforts of Yuni and a repositioned Haijima, however, Seiin nevertheless claims victory after winning the subsequent sets. Similarly to Seiin, Fukuho is also victorious against their first opponents. A post-credits scene reveals that after winning several more matches, Seiin manages to advance to the play-offs.
9	"The Unbeaten and the Dark Horse"; Transliteration: "Jōshō to Dāku Hōsu" (Japanese: 常勝とダークホース)	Takahiro Kamei	Yōsuke Kuroda	March 5, 2021
Both Fukuho and Seiin spend time strategizing and practicing to prepare for their upcoming match. Meanwhile, Subaru's doctor informs him that his knees will likely require further surgery and that he will potentially need to refrain from sports for up to two years if he wants to pursue volleyball as a career in the future. Meanwhile, Seiin's coach splits the team into pairs of two for a special practice session. After the session, partners Haijima and Aoki exchange words of encouragement, the former assuring that Seiin will make it to the spring tournament and the latter promising that he will back Haijima's strategic suggestions for the team. Prior to the start of the match between Fukuho and Seiin, Fukuho's manager Ochi is injured and has to be taken to the hospital.
10	"The Hero and The Genius 1"; Transliteration: "Eiyū to Tensai Ichi" (Japanese: 英雄と天才1)	Shō Sugawara	Yōsuke Kuroda	March 12, 2021
Fukuho's coach scolds the team for having accidentally led to Ochi's injury while playing in the snow before the match with Seiin. Subaru continues to conceal the truth about the condition of his knees, and Fukuho is victorious in the first set. Though Seiin manages to win the second set with an impressive performance by Haijima, they suffer a setback when Yuni has a nosebleed after his spiked volleyball is repelled by Fukuho's blockers and hits him in the face. With Yuni out of the game, Seiin loses the third set. In a post-credits scene, Subaru visits the infirmary, where Haijima is checking on Yuni.
11	"The Hero and The Genius 2"; Transliteration: "Eiyū to Tensai Ni" (Japanese: 英雄と天才2)	Tetsuji Nakamura	Yōsuke Kuroda	March 19, 2021
While visiting Haijima and Yuni in the infirmary, Subaru apologizes that Fukuho's block led to Yuni's injury. As the conversation concludes, Yuni begins to suspect that Subaru might have sustained an injury in the past. After Haijima apologizes to Yuni and admits that his reason for putting pressure on Yuni to excel is that he views him as an outstanding athlete, Yuni reenters to the match in time for the fourth set. Ochi returns from the hospital as the set is too close to call. After a tenacious back and forth extending the game to 30 points, Seiin is victorious in the fourth set, meaning that the fifth will determine which team wins the match. Subaru continues to impress in the final set, though a final block by Oda wins the match for Seiin. Haijima begins discovering that volleyball means more to him than simply winning and that he wants to keep playing forever.
12	"Runway"; Transliteration: "Kassōro" (Japanese: 滑走路)	Jirō Fujimoto	Yōsuke Kuroda	March 26, 2021 (Note: This episode aired on March 26, 2021 at 1:35 am. JST, 40 minutes after the original air time on Fuji TV.)
As Seiin and Fukuho line up following the game, Haijima begins to feel faint. Following an exchange of well wishes with Oda, Subaru is revealed to have concealed being in serious pain ever since accidentally colliding knees with Aoki in the fifth set. Ochi finds Subaru alone; and the two share a heartfelt moment, after which the entire Fukuho team cries together and Subaru promises himself that he will return to volleyball following the completion of surgery and physical therapy. Later, Haijima awakens to see the rest of the Seiin team, who have come to bring him a victory medal and drive him to the celebration being held by Yuni's family. After the bracket for the nationals matches are released, Oda announces plans to continue volleyball in college and asks Aoki to join him in the endeavor. Later, the Seiin team attends a joint practice that includes college teams, during which Subaru catches up with Haijima and the two discuss their futures in volleyball. Encouraged by the prospect of representing Japan internationally, Haijima and Yuni resolve to play volleyball as long as they can.

== Reception ==
The anime adaptation's first episode received mixed reviews from Anime News Network's staff during the Winter 2021 season previews. Caitlin Moore critiqued that the episode was a "quieter, slower character piece" akin to Stars Align, praising the "detailed and deliberate" character acting and strong, relatable writing regarding Yuni and Chika, saying it has "come right out the gate with one of the best premieres of winter so far". Nicholas Dupree praised the premiere for Yuni's "tempered but still present earnestness" being delivered with "well written dialogue" containing "character and personality" along with the rest of the cast and Yasuhiro Kimura's environmental work and storyboarding for giving the settings a "sense of place". James Beckett praised David Production for capturing the usual sports melodrama without being "too listless or downbeat" and the above average writing providing "naturalistic and relatable" dialogue for its characters, but was critical of Chika not being "interesting or engaging" beyond his douchebag personality and his relationship with Yuni. Theron Martin found the episode more palatable than Haikyu!! due to its tolerable character designs and personalities showing through their appearances and felt that Chika's "darker-edged intensity" displayed a "more intriguing character", concluding that: "In all, this series seems like it has at least some potential, especially on the dramatic front. Whether or not that will be enough to hold the interest of those who don't normally care for sports series remains to be seen." Rebecca Silverman was taken aback by the "pretty grim" debut being "relentlessly dark" with its bullying plot, both Chika and Yuni having "unsavory elements" in their respective lives and felt it lacked the "dynamic art and animation" of previous sports shows, concluding that: "It's no Haikyu!!, and while it doesn't need to be, it should at least make me want to see these guys develop and win, and this episode isn't giving me those feelings." Fellow ANN editor Christopher Farris reviewed the complete anime series, saying: "Far from the potentially-terrifying wild ride it began as, or the broad espousal of genuine team spirit it nearly grew into, we end up with yet another typical story of a few focused-on friends wanting to play volleyball real good."
