= Kana Ichinose =

Japanese voice actress (born 1996)

- 市ノ瀬 加那
- Ichinose at the 39th Tokyo International Film Festival in 2026
- Born: December 20, 1996 (age 29); Obihiro, Hokkaido, Japan
- Occupation: Voice actress
- Years active: 2016–present
- Agent: Sigma Seven
- Notable work: Darling in the Franxx as Ichigo; In the Heart of Kunoichi Tsubaki as Tachiaoi; Mobile Suit Gundam: The Witch from Mercury as Suletta Mercury; Kaguya-sama: Love Is War as Maki Shijo; Frieren: Beyond Journey's End as Fern
- Height: 148 cm (4 ft 10 in)

Kana Ichinose (市ノ瀬 加那, Ichinose Kana; born December 20, 1996) is a Japanese voice actress. She played her first main role in 2018 as Ichigo in the anime series Darling in the Franxx. Ichinose went on to headline Mobile Suit Gundam: The Witch from Mercury in 2022 as Suletta Mercury, the franchise's first female protagonist of a TV anime. She also voices Fern in Frieren: Beyond Journey's End, Sayu Ogiwara in Higehiro and Marlya Noel in Fairy Gone, all of the characters are also voiced by American voice actress Jill Harris.

== Biography ==
In 2021, Ichinose became a recipient of the Best New Actress Award at the 15th Seiyu Awards. In March 2024, she won the Best Leading Actor Award at the 18th Seiyu Awards.

== Filmography ==
=== TV anime ===
2018

- Darling in the Franxx (Ichigo)
- Iroduku: The World in Colors (Asagi Kazeno)
- Aikatsu Friends! (Chihori Kumano)

2019

- Boogiepop and Others (Aya Orihata)
- Kaguya-sama: Love Is War (Maki Shijo)
- Hitori Bocchi no Marumaru Seikatsu (Kako Kurai)
- Fairy Gone (Marlya Noel)
- Carole & Tuesday (Tuesday Simmons)
- To the Abandoned Sacred Beasts (Miglieglia)
- Dr. Stone (Yuzuriha Ogawa)
- Senki Zesshō Symphogear XV (Elsa)

2020

- If My Favorite Pop Idol Made It to the Budokan, I Would Die (Reina)
- Gleipnir (Chihiro Yoshioka)
- Shachibato! President, It's Time for Battle! (Yutoria)
- Mewkledreamy (Yuri Sawamura)
- Kaguya-sama: Love Is War? (Maki Shijo)
- Golden Kamuy 3rd Season (Enonoka)
- Akudama Drive (Sister)

2021

- Dr. Stone: Stone Wars (Yuzuriha Ogawa)
- Higehiro (Sayu Ogiwara)
- The Saint's Magic Power Is Omnipotent (Aira Misono)
- Amaim Warrior at the Borderline (Shion Shishibe)

2022

- Trapped in a Dating Sim: The World of Otome Games Is Tough for Mobs (Olivia)
- In the Heart of Kunoichi Tsubaki (Tachiaoi)
- Kaguya-sama: Love Is War – Ultra Romantic (Maki Shijo)
- Love After World Domination (Drone Rabbit)
- Made in Abyss: The Golden City of the Scorching Sun (Maaa)
- Extreme Hearts (Michelle Jaeger)
- Mobile Suit Gundam: The Witch from Mercury (Suletta Mercury, Ericht Samaya)
- Do It Yourself!! (Purin)

2023

- Ayakashi Triangle (Suzu Kanade)
- In/Spectre 2nd Season (Marumi Oki)
- The Saint's Magic Power Is Omnipotent 2nd Season (Aira Misono)
- Dr. Stone: New World (Yuzuriha Ogawa)
- Otaku Elf (Isuzu Koimari)
- Frieren: Beyond Journey's End (Fern)
- My Daughter Left the Nest and Returned an S-Rank Adventurer (Seren Bordeaux)

2024

- The Strongest Tank's Labyrinth Raids (Luna)
- An Archdemon's Dilemma: How to Love Your Elf Bride (Nephy)
- Vampire Dormitory (Mito Yamamoto)
- Why Does Nobody Remember Me in This World? (Rinne)
- Narenare: Cheer for You! (Mari Aieda)

2025

- Blue Box (Ayame Moriya)
- Medalist (Hikaru Kamisaki)
- Even Given the Worthless "Appraiser" Class, I'm Actually the Strongest (Alice)
- Honey Lemon Soda (Uka Ishimori)
- Flower and Asura (Misaki Kumori)
- Yaiba: Samurai Legend (Sea Cucumber Man)
- #Compass 2.0: Combat Providence Analysis System (Ruruka)
- The Beginning After the End (Tessia Eralith)
- The Shiunji Family Children (Kotono Shiunji)
- There's No Freaking Way I'll be Your Lover! Unless... (Satsuki Koto)
- Turkey! Time to Strike (Rina Godai)
- Monster Strike: Deadverse Reloaded (Rinne)

2026

- Chained Soldier 2 (Konomi Tatara)
- The Holy Grail of Eris (Constance Grail)
- Hikuidori (Osuzu)
- Frieren 2nd Season (Fern)
- The Food Diary of Miss Maid (Suzume Tachibana)
- A Hundred Scenes of Awajima (Sara Takanashi)
- Saved by the Ice Cold Prince's Embrace (Nina)
- Young Ladies Don't Play Fighting Games (Mio Yorue)
- Sgt. Frog☆ (Angol Mois)
- Tetsuryō! Meet with Tetsudō Musume (Karen Matsukaze)

2027

- 7-nin no Nemuri Hime (Charlotte)

=== Original video animations ===
- Code Geass: Rozé of the Recapture (Chalice)

=== Original net animations ===
2025

- Yu-Gi-Oh! Card Game The Chronicles (Ecclesia)

=== Animated films ===
- Weathering with You (2019), Sasaki
- Kaguya-sama: Love Is War – The First Kiss That Never Ends (2022), Maki Shijo
- Grotesqqque (2026), Elie
- Gekijōban Medalist (2027), Hikaru Kamisaki

=== Video games ===
2018

- Kirara Fantasia (Nijou Omi)

2019

- Final Fantasy XIV: Shadowbringers (Ryne)
- Magia Record (Mikura Komachi)

2020

- #COMPASS (Luruca)
- Action Taimanin (Yozora Hanasaki)
- Azur Lane (USS Ticonderoga, USS Bunker Hill)
- Girls' Frontline (MK 12) (Scout)
- Samurai Shodown (Gongsun Li)

2021

- Kanda Alice mo Suiri Suru. (Alice Kanda)
- Tsukihime -A piece of blue glass moon- (Hisui)
- RED:Pride of Eden (Droia)
- Final Fantasy XIV: Endwalker (Ryne)

2022

- Alchemy Stars (Bethel)
- Soul Tide 2021 (Amane Inori)
- Brave Nine (Devi)
- World II World (Raqqa)
- Onmyoji (Shiki)
- SD Gundam Battle Alliance (Sakura Slash, Suletta Mercury)

2023

- The Idolmaster Cinderella Girls: Starlight Stage (Layla)

2024

- Sword of Convallaria (Edda)
- Persona 5: The Phantom X (Miyu Sahara)
- Final Fantasy XIV: Dawntrail (Ryne, Pandora)

2025

- ToHeart (Akari Kamigishi)

2026

- Echoes of Aincrad (Iori)
