= Yama (singer) =

Japanese singer

- Genres: J-pop
- Occupation: Singer
- Years active: 2018–present
- Label: Sony Music Entertainment Japan
- Member of: BIN

Yama (stylized in lowercase; Japanese: ヤマ) is a Japanese singer affiliated with Sony Music Entertainment Japan. After starting a singing career with Vocaloid covers, they became the vocalist of the rock trio BIN, and they also have performed music for the anime 2.43: Seiin High School Boys Volleyball Team, Ranking of Kings, Spy × Family, Mobile Suit Gundam: The Witch from Mercury, and Sanda.

== Biography ==
While in junior high school, Yama started making Vocaloid covers at home. In March 2018, under the name "Yama" (stylized in lowercase), Yama made their singing debut with a YouTube cover of Picon's "Atatakai Ikimono". In 2019, Yama formed the rock trio BIN, as the group's vocalist under the stage name Yamagami.

In November 2019, Yama participated as a guest vocalist in a special version of Kujira's song "Nemurumachi". In April 2020, Yama's first original song, "Haru wo Tsugeru", was released; it peaked at #7 on the Billboard Japan Hot 100 and #8 at the Oricon Combined Singles Chart.

In 2021, Yama sang "Mahi", the opening theme of 2.43: Seiin High School Boys Volleyball Team, and in February 2021, it was released as a single from Sony Music Records. In September 2021, Yama's first album, The Meaning of Life, was released. Yama later sang "Oz", the ending theme of Ranking of Kings; in November 2021, it was released as part of another single, "Oz/Sekai wa Utsukushī Hazunanda/Smokey Heroine", with all three songs in their 2022 album "Versus the Night".

In 2022, Yama's song "Shikisai", was featured as the ending theme for the second half of Spy × Family's first season; it was released as a single in November 2022. In 2023, Yama performed "Slash", the opening theme of the second season of Mobile Suit Gundam: The Witch from Mercury; it was later released as a single that year, alongside another album the next year. From 28 November to 5 December 2023, Yama held a solo concert tour throughout Southeast Asia and Taiwan, performing in Kuala Lumpur, Singapore, Manila, Bangkok, and Taipei.

Yama uses a genderfluid public image, and their voice has been described by Azrin Tan of Vogue Singapore as "soulful, feminine". Most of Yama's personal life is kept anonymous, including their true identity and gender. When asked about this, Yama cited a lack of self-confidence and a desire to keep a real-life identity separate from their career.

== Discography ==
=== Albums ===
Title	Year	Album details	Peak chart positions		Sales	Ref.
Title	Year	Album details	JPN	JPN Comb.	Sales	Ref.
The Meaning of Life	2021	Released: 1 September 2021; Label: Sony Music Records	7	6	—	
Versus the Night	2022	Released: 31 August 2022; Label: Sony Music Records	18	13	—	
Awake & Build	2024	Released: 24 January 2024; Label: Sony Music Records	20	27	—	
; Semicolon	2025	Released: 5 March 2025; Label: Sony Music Records	39	—	1,563	
"—" denotes releases that did not chart or were not released in that region.

=== Extended playlists ===
Title	Year	Album details	Peak chart positions		Sales	Ref.
Title	Year	Album details	JPN	JPN Comb.	Sales	Ref.
C.U.T	2026	Released: March 18, 2026; Label: Sony Music Records	—	—	—	
"—" denotes releases that did not chart or were not released in that region.

=== Singles ===
Title	Year	Peak chart positions			Certifications	Album	Ref.
Title	Year	JPN	JPN Comb.	JPN Hot	Certifications	Album	Ref.
"Haru o Tsugeru" (春を告げる)	2020	—	8	7		Non-album singles	
"Cream" (クリーム)	2020	—	—	—		Non-album singles	
"Downtown"	2020	—	—	—		Non-album singles	
"A.M.3:21"	2020	—	—	—		Non-album singles	
"Aruihaeiganoyouna" (あるいは映画のような)	2020	—	—	—		Non-album singles	
"Masshiro" (真っ白)	2020	—	—	—		The Meaning of Life	
"Mahi" (麻痺)	2021	15	49	60	RIAJ: Gold (st.)	The Meaning of Life	
"Namae no Nai Hibi e" (名前のない日々へ)	2021	—	—	—		The Meaning of Life	
"Issun no Aka" (一寸の赤)	2021	—	—	—		The Meaning of Life	
"Curtain Call" (カーテンコール)	2021	—	—	65		The Meaning of Life	
"Sleepless Night"	2021	—	—	—		The Meaning of Life	
"Oz."	2021	44	—	63		Versus the Night	
"Sekai wa Utsukushī Hazunanda" (世界は美しいはずなんだ)	2021	44	—	—		Versus the Night	
"Smokey Heroine" (スモーキーヒロイン)	2021	44	—	—		Versus the Night	
"MoonWalker"	2022	—	—	—		Versus the Night	
"Tōgenkyō" (桃源郷)	2022	—	—	—		Versus the Night	
"Color" (色彩)	2022	29	21	14	RIAJ: Gold (dig.); Platinum (st.)	Awake&Build	
"Slash"	2023	20	35	26		Awake&Build	
"Henkou (Movie Edition)" (返光 (Movie Edition))	2023	—	—	—		Non-album single	
"As I Longed For" (憧れのままに) (with Tatsuya Kitani)	2023	—	—	—		Awake&Build	
"Pure Colors" (パレットは透明)	2023	—	—	—		Awake&Build	
"Halo" (ハロ) (with BotchiBoromaru)	2023	—	—	—		Awake&Build	
"Kodama" (こだま)	2024	—	—	—		; Semicolon	
"Statement" (声明)	2024	—	—	—		; Semicolon	
"Origin" (オリジン)	2024	—	—	—		; Semicolon	
"Burn" (with WurtS)	2025	—	—	—		; Semicolon	
"Drop" (雫) (featuring Indigo la End)	2025	—	—	—		; Semicolon	
"Gridout"	2025	—	—	—		Non-album singles	
"Us"	2025	—	—	—		Non-album singles	
"Ever"	2025	—	—	—		Non-album singles	
"Childlike Adults" (アダルトチックチルドレン)	2025	—	—	—		Non-album singles	
"Magical Syndrome" (マジカルシンドローム)	2025	—	—	—		Non-album singles	
"Kisetsu no Tou" (季節の灯)	2025					Non-album singles	
"Twilight"	2025					C.U.T	
"End Roll"	2026					C.U.T	
"Dawn"	2026					C.U.T	
"Sanagi" (蛹)	2026					C.U.T	
"Fly Away" (飛ぶ時)	2026					Non-album singles	
"Way Out" (飛ぼうよ)	2026					Non-album singles	
"U and I"	2026					Non-album singles	
"—" denotes releases that did not chart.
