= Mobile Suit Gundam: The Witch from Mercury =

Japanese anime television series

- Key visual for the series
- 機動戦士ガンダム 水星の魔女
- Genre: Mecha; Military science fiction
- Created by: Hajime Yatate; Yoshiyuki Tomino
- Developed by: Ichirō Ōkouchi
- Directed by: Hiroshi Kobayashi
- Voices of: Kana Ichinose; Lynn; Yōhei Azakami; Natsuki Hanae; Makoto Furukawa; Yume Miyamoto; Miyu Tomita; Mamiko Noto; Naoya Uchida
- Music by: Takashi Ohmama
- Country of origin: Japan
- Original language: Japanese
- No. of seasons: 2
- No. of episodes: 24 (list of episodes)

Production
- Executive producers: Naohiro Ogata; Retsu Tamura; Hirô Maruyama
- Producers: Takuya Okamoto; Toshihiro Maeda
- Animator: Sunrise
- Production companies: Bandai Namco Filmworks; Sotsu; MBS

Original release
- Network: JNN (MBS, TBS)
- Release: October 2, 2022 – July 2, 2023

Related
Further information
Original net animation
Mobile Suit Gundam: The Witch from Mercury – Prologue
Directed by	Hiroshi Kobayashi
Produced by	Naohiro Ogata
Written by	Ichirō Ōkouchi
Music by	Takashi Ohmama
Studio	Sunrise
Licensed by	Crunchyroll (streaming); NA: Sunrise (licensing)
Released	July 14, 2022
Runtime	23 minutes
Episodes	1
Novel
Cradle Planet
Written by	Ichirō Ōkouchi
Published by	Sunrise
Published	October 2, 2022
Light novel
Mobile Suit Gundam: The Witch from Mercury
Written by	Yūya Takashima
Illustrated by	Shūei Takagi
Published by	Kadokawa Shoten
Magazine	Gundam Ace
Original run	November 26, 2022 – present
Manga
Vanadis Heart
Written by	Kō Yoneyama; HISADAKE
Illustrated by	Chika Tōjō
Published by	Kadokawa Shoten
English publisher	NA: Yen Press
Magazine	Gundam Ace
Original run	March 25, 2023 – present
Manga
Frontier of Youth
Written by	HISADAKE
Illustrated by	Hiro Hata
Published by	Kadokawa Shoten
Magazine	Comic Newtype
Original run	May 23, 2025 – present

Mobile Suit Gundam: The Witch from Mercury (Japanese: 機動戦士ガンダム 水星の魔女, Hepburn: Kidō Senshi Gandamu: Suisei no Majo) is a Japanese mecha anime television series and the fifteenth mainline entry in Sunrise's long-running Gundam franchise. It was directed by Hiroshi Kobayashi with scripts by Ichirō Ōkouchi, and aired from October 2022 to July 2023.

Set in a world where numerous companies have advanced into space and constitute a huge economic zone, the story concerns the Mobile Suits known as "GUND-ARMS" ("Gundams" for short), weapons that were developed out of diverted health technology "GUND" which compensates for physical disabilities caused by living in space.

The Witch from Mercury is the first TV series in the Gundam franchise to feature both a female and LGBTQ protagonist, Suletta Mercury. Thematically, the series focuses on capitalism and political corruption, drawing stylistical inspiration from Shakespeare's The Tempest with elements from witch trials, which inspired the titular Gundam technology.

== Story ==
=== Setting ===
The series is set in the new calendar system dubbed the Ad Stella (AS). In this timeline, humanity has advanced into space yet a conflict occurred that caused a split between the inhabitants of space colonies, also called "Spacians" and the Earth-born "Earthians", with a vast economic inequality between the two. These conflicts revolved around the material, Permet, which was mined because of its information-linking properties. Various technologies have been developed by mixing Permet with other materials or propellants for control purposes, including Mobile Suit development. Several megacorporations are established in this timeline which all focus on the development of technology for Spacians but also caused the social and political divide between them and the Earthians.

=== Plot ===
In the year Ad Stella 101, researchers at the Vanadis Institute created "GUND", an advanced brain–computer interface that enabled the human nervous system to control artificial appendages and organs. The purpose of GUND was to enable humans to survive in the harsh environment of space. After receiving funding from mobile suit manufacturer Ochs Earth, the technology was developed into the "GUND Format" and employed for military uses, leading to the creation of "GUND-ARMS": mobile suits that use the GUND Format to increase the performance of their pilots. However, extensive use of GUND-ARMS resulted in pilots being crippled or even killed.

In response, the Mobile Suit Development Council, led by the top mobile suit development companies, ordered an entire permanent ban on the GUND Format and all its applications. Council member Delling Rembran, president of the Benerit Group, deployed the special forces team Dominicus to destroy the Vanadis research facility Fólkvangr, killing everyone aboard to erase all traces of the technology. Only two people survived: mobile suit test pilot Elnora Samaya and her four-year-old daughter Ericht Samaya. In the aftermath, those responsible for the development of the GUND Format were ostracized, and because the team was primarily composed of women, they became known as "witches".

In Ad Stella 122, 21 years after the Vanadis incident, Suletta Mercury transfers from Mercury to the Asticassia School of Technology, an academic institute run by the megacorporation Benerit Group. Upon arrival, she encounters a girl escaping the institute, Miorine Rembran, who wants to escape from the control of Delling, her father. Miorine is engaged to be married to the highest scoring duellist in a mobile suit – currently Guel Jeturk.

As their paths cross in the academy with different ambitions and goals, Suletta will have to prove her worth as a pilot as she steps into the academy alongside the Gundam Aerial, a mobile suit built with forbidden GUND Format technology.

== Media ==
=== Anime ===
A prequel episode known as the "Prologue" was screened at the "Gundam Next Future -Link the Universe-" events in July 2022; it was later released worldwide through official YouTube channels and streaming services in September of the same year. The main television series premiered on MBS and TBS in Japan on October 2, 2022. A second season began airing in April 2023.

Crunchyroll simulcast the series outside of East Asia, while Medialink streamed it in Southeast Asia through Ani-One Asia. Beginning on January 30, 2023, Crunchyroll released an English dub. The series aired on Mexico's Azteca 7 beginning February 16, 2024.

Yoasobi performed the series' first opening theme "Shukufuku" (祝福; "The Blessing") and released an English version alongside an official music video for it; Yama performed the second opening theme "Slash". Shiyui and Ryo performed the first ending theme "Kimi yo Kedakaku Are" (君よ 気高くあれ; "You Be Noble"), while Aina the End performed the second ending theme "Red:Birthmark". Takashi Ohmama composed the music for the series.

=== Print ===
An official web novel titled "Cradle Planet" (ゆりかごの星, Yurikago no Hoshi), written by Ichirō Ōkouchi, was released by Sunrise on their official website on October 2, 2022. The English version was subsequently released on November 10, 2022, translated by Eriko Sugita. The web novel serves as a link between the Prologue and the main series and is told from the point of view of the Gundam Aerial. A live reading of the novel was released on YouTube on November 13, 2022, with Kana Ichinose as the narrator. The anime was later adapted into an ongoing light novel in Kadokawa Shoten's Gundam Ace magazine from November 26, 2022, written by Yūya Takashima with illustrations by Shūei Takagi. The novel adapts both the Prologue and main storylines, and will also include some original characters and subplots

A side-story manga titled Mobile Suit Gundam The Witch from Mercury: Vanadis Heart (Japanese: 機動戦士ガンダム 水星の魔女 ヴァナディースハート, Hepburn: Kidō Senshi Gandamu Suisei no Majo: Vuanadīsu Hāto), written by both Kō Yoneyama and illustrated by Chika Tōjō, with original character designs by mogmo and planning cooperation by Hisadake, began serialization in Kadokawa Shoten's Gundam Ace magazine from March 25, 2023. The manga is set in A.S. 106, five years after the Vanadis incident, and focuses on a witch named Vilda Miren and a pilot named Kiyu Lavot, who pilots the XGF-01[II3] Gundam Lfrith Jiu. In December 2025, Yen Press announced that they had licensed the side-story for English publication beginning in June 2026.

In December 2024, another spinoff manga, Mobile Suit Gundam The Witch from Mercury: Frontier of Youth (Japanese: 機動戦士ガンダム 水星の魔女 青春フロンティア, Hepburn: Kidō Senshi Gandamu Suisei no Majo: Seishun Frontier), written by Hisadake and illustrated by Hiro Hata began serialization on Comic Newtype on May 23, 2025. This time, the events of the manga will take place in an alternative setting closer to modern Japan, retelling the events of the original anime in a more everyday comedy and slice of life vein.

=== Merchandise ===
Alongside other merchandise releases, the series is also part of the long-running Gunpla line of plastic model kits by Bandai Spirits. Kits based on the Mobile Suits in the series were released in 1/144 scale. High Grade and SDEX models of the Gundam Aerial were released in 2022, and a 1/100 scale Full Mechanics kit was released in 2023. Action figure releases include those in the Chogokin, Robot Spirits, and Gundam Universe lines.

According to an official Bandai press release, the High Grade Gundam Aerial recorded the highest initial sales "among the HG TV series lead role Gundam versions", going on to become the best selling Gunpla kit of 2022, while the High Grade Gundam Calibarn became the best selling kit of 2023.

Shortly after the release of the series, Sunrise partnered with Yamazaki Biscuits for a cross-promotion following a string of Internet memes stemming from the Bic Camera branch in Akihabara stocking empty shelves of the Gundam Aerial model kit with YBC Aerial corn chips.

=== Video games ===
The Gundam Aerial, along with Suletta, appeared in the mobile game Mobile Suit Gundam UC Engage as a limited event unit. It also made an appearance in the action RPG video game SD Gundam Battle Alliance as a DLC unit. It reappears as a playable unit again in the arcade game Mobile Suit Gundam Extreme Vs. 2 OverBoost and later supplant by the Gundam Pharact from the First Season and the Darilbalde from the Second Season. The Gundam Aerial is set to appear as a bundle in Call of Duty: Modern Warfare III. In Mobile Suit Gundam Extreme Vs. 2 Infinite Boost, Gundam Aerial Rebuild is a playable unit, however, the unit has two slots with different pilots.

== Reception ==
=== Critical response ===
The Witch from Mercury has been praised by critics for its writing, characters, animation, voice acting, dark drama, yuri elements, and its unique take on the classic Gundam formula. IGN gave the first season of the series a rave review, giving it a 9/10, praising the show's drama and striking imagery. Polygon also gave the show's first season a glowing reviewing, claiming the series is becoming the "ultimate Gundam show" and is finally an anime in the prestige franchise that anyone could enjoy. Kim Morrissy from Anime News Network has also praised the series, citing the show has good emotional moments. Harry Nugraha from Game Rant was less impressed with the first season, finding the school life drama to be "disappointing". However, Nugraha thought the show featured some "thrilling combat scenes" and felt the series was picking up steam in the last few episodes of the season. Vulture listed the first season as the third best anime of 2022. Following the finale of the second season, Tsunehiro Uno of PLANETS criticized the series for failing to adequately engage with the first season's issues of mediocre direction and breaking out of comfort zones, noting that the theme of conflict was ultimately relegated to being an Easter egg of the school life setting.

Mamiko Noto's portrayal of Prospera has received acclaim, with many lauding her theatrical performance and the complexity of her character. Gizmodo positively compared Prospera to the Gundam franchise's iconic villain Char Aznable, referencing how both characters wear masks and the duality of their personalities. Christopher Farris from Anime News Network also raved about the character, applauding her effectiveness as a villain and found her storyline to be "gripping".

The English dub received controversy due to the decision to have Suletta Mercury be voiced by white voice actor Jill Harris. Suletta Mercury is implied to have Middle Eastern or North African heritage and her father's name Nadim Samaya has Arabic, Hebrew, and Indian origins.

=== Reaction to the Season one finale ===
The end of the first season of the Witch from Mercury featured Suletta piloting the Gundam Aerial to smash a terrorist violently. Many viewers and commentators were caught off guard by the sudden act of violence, especially the imagery of Suletta's blood-stained hands and Miorine's horrified reaction. The finale was compared to a major twist from Code Geass, another anime project worked by Ichirō Ōkouchi. Both the Witch from Mercury and Code Geass trended on social media as fans reacted to the gruesome scene in Gundam. Japan's Broadcasting Ethics & Program Improvement Organization shared complaints from parents about the violent nature of the episode, with many finding it to be too graphic to show at the 5:00 PM timeslot when children are still up to watch it.

=== Criticism on working conditions for Season two finale ===
The Witch from Mercury garnered some criticism after the airing of Season Two, Episode 24, when it was revealed that over 90 key animators worked on the series' final episode. The end credits of said episode listed 94 key animators who worked on the series finale, an unusually high amount for one episode of a half-hour animated TV series. One of the credited character designers, Marie Tagashira, praised her colleagues for completing a difficult and impressive work but excluded an unnamed few from her celebratory tweet. Fans and journalists took this as a hint animators involved in the creation of the show suffered from mismanagement that was forced to be addressed via human-wave tactics and overtime.

=== Removed mention of same-sex marriage ===
On July 26, 2023, an interview with Witch from Mercury's voice cast in the September 2023 issue of Gundam Ace magazine included a quote from Kana Ichinose in which she referenced Suletta and Miorine's marriage. Miorine was also directly referenced as Suletta's wife by the official English-language Gundam Twitter account on the day of the finale. Following the release of the magazine interview, the hashtag スレミオ結婚 (SuleMio Marriage) trended in Japan.

Days later, however, the digital version of the Gundam Ace interview was edited to remove the direct reference to marriage, causing an immediate backlash from Japanese and Western fans of the show, who claimed the characters' "undisputed" status as a married couple was being deliberately censored.

On July 30, a statement was released by Kadokawa in which they claimed the discrepancy was a "proofreading mistake" and that the marriage reference was based on "editorial speculation". An accompanying statement was released on the official Witch from Mercury website in which these claims were repeated, in addition to implying the events of the series are open to interpretation by viewers, leading to angry or confused responses from fans and general viewers who pointed out Suletta and Miorine's marriage was objectively confirmed both in the anime's final scene and by the characters' voice actors in an audio commentary for the final episode or official final stream after that, and as such no room for "interpretation" exists.

The wedding itself was not depicted on-screen, but the characters are shown wearing rings in the final scene of the series, and Suletta's sister Ericht refers to herself as Miorine's sister-in-law. The September 2023 issues of the Animage and Animedia magazines published on August 9 provided Mamiko Noto and Lynn's interpretations of the scene as Ericht behaving like an in-law.

Five months after the initial magazine controversy, Witch from Mercury's final Blu-ray volume was released, including an interview with Hiroshi Kobayashi, series director and storyboard artist for the series finale, confirming Suletta and Miorine are indeed married in the story's final scene. Following this confirmation, the hashtag スレミオ結婚 (SuleMio Marriage) once again trended in Japan.

Preceded by Mobile Suit Gundam: Cucuruz Doan's Island	Gundam metaseries (production order); 2022–2023	Succeeded by Gundam Build Metaverse
