= List of Spy × Family episodes =

Key visual for the series

Spy × Family is an anime television series based on Tatsuya Endo's Spy × Family manga series. Produced by Wit Studio and CloverWorks, the series is directed by Kazuhiro Furuhashi, with character designs by Kazuaki Shimada while Kazuaki Shimada and Kyoji Asano are chief animation directors. The music is composed and produced by (K)now Name. It was first announced in October 2021.

The series follows master spy Twilight, who must disguise himself as psychiatrist Loid Forger and build a mock family in order to investigate political leader Donovan Desmond. Unbeknownst to him, his wife, Yor, is actually an assassin known as the Thorn Princess, while his daughter, Anya, has telepathic abilities. The family pet dog, Bond, has powers of premonition, which is partially conferred to Anya whenever she reads his mind.

The first season of the series, which consists of 25 episodes, is separated into two parts known as cours. The first cours, consisting of 12 episodes, aired from April 9 to June 25, 2022, while the second cours, consisting of 13 episodes, aired from October 1 to December 24 of the same year, on TV Tokyo and other networks. In December 2022, a second season and a theatrical film were announced at the Jump Festa '23 event. Ichirō Ōkouchi replaced Furuhashi as scriptwriter, with the remaining staff and cast having returned to reprise their roles. The second season, consisting of 12 episodes, aired from October 7 to December 23, 2023. In June 2024, a third season was announced at a special event for the series. Yukiko Imai replaced Furuhashi and Takahiro Harada as the season's director, while the remaining staff and cast returned to reprise their roles. It aired from October 4 to December 27, 2025. In November 2026, a fourth season and the second theatrical film were announced at a special event for the series. Yasuhiro Akamatsu replaced Imai as the season's director, with Aya Takaha handled the series' composition, and character designs by Kazuaki Shimada and Satoshi Kawadaki. It is set to premiere in 2027.

The anime series is licensed for streaming by Crunchyroll outside of Asia, while Muse Communication holds distribution rights for the series in South and Southeast Asia.

== Series overview ==
Season	Episodes		Originally released	
Season	Episodes		First released	Last released
1	25	12	April 9, 2022	June 25, 2022
1	25	13	October 1, 2022	December 24, 2022
2	12		October 7, 2023	December 23, 2023
3	13		October 4, 2025	December 27, 2025

== Episodes ==
=== Season 1 (2022) ===
No. overall	No. in season	Title	Directed by (Note: Production staff information is taken from the ending credits of each episode)	Written by	Storyboarded by	Original release date	Viewership rating
Part 1
1	1	"Operation Strix"; Transliteration: "Operēshon <Sutorikusu>" (Japanese: オペレーション〈梟(ストリクス)〉)	Kazuhiro Furuhashi	Tomomi Kawaguchi	Kazuhiro Furuhashi	April 9, 2022 (Note: Episodes 1 and 2 were pre-screened on April 1, 2022)	3.1%
2	2	"Secure a Wife"; Transliteration: "Tsuma-yaku o Kakuho Seyo" (Japanese: 妻役を確保せよ)	Takahiro Harada	Rino Yamazaki	Kazuhiro Furuhashi	April 16, 2022	2.7%
3	3	"Prepare for the Interview"; Transliteration: "Juken Taisaku o Seyo" (Japanese: 受験対策をせよ)	Takashi Katagiri	Daishirō Tanimura	Kazuhiro Furuhashi	April 23, 2022	N/A
4	4	"The Prestigious School's Interview"; Transliteration: "Meimonkō Mensetsu Shiken" (Japanese: 名門校面接試験)	Kento Matsui	Rino Yamazaki	Tatsuyuki Nagai	April 30, 2022	N/A
5	5	"Will They Pass or Fail?"; Transliteration: "Gōhi no Yukue" (Japanese: 合否の行方)	Kenji Takahashi	Tomomi Kawaguchi	Shinsaku Sasaki	May 7, 2022	2.7%
6	6	"The Friendship Scheme"; Transliteration: "Nakayoshi Sakusen" (Japanese: ナカヨシ作戦)	Yōsuke Yamamoto	Daishirō Tanimura	Yōsuke Yamamoto	May 14, 2022	2.6%
7	7	"The Target's Second Son"; Transliteration: "Tāgetto no Jinan" (Japanese: 標的(ターゲット)の次男)	Kazuki Horiguchi	Tomomi Kawaguchi	Kazuhiro Furuhashi	May 21, 2022	2.5%
8	8	"The Counter-Secret Police Cover Operation"; Transliteration: "Taihimitsu Keisatsu Gisō Sakusen" (Japanese: 対秘密警察偽装作戦)	Yukiko Imai	Rino Yamazaki	Yukiko Imai	May 28, 2022	2.8%
9	9	"Show Off How in Love You Are"; Transliteration: "Rabu Rabu o Misetsukeyo" (Japanese: ラブラブを見せつけよ)	Takashi Katagiri	Honoka Katō	Takashi Katagiri	June 4, 2022	2.7%
10	10	"The Great Dodgeball Plan"; Transliteration: "Dojjibōru Daisakusen" (Japanese: ドッジボール大作戦)	Kenji Takahashi	Daishirō Tanimura	Kenji Takahashi	June 11, 2022	2.8%
11	11	"Stella"; Transliteration: "<Sutera>" (Japanese: 〈星(ステラ)〉)	Toshifumi Akai	Rino Yamazaki	Toshifumi Akai	June 18, 2022	3.0%
12	12	"Penguin Park"; Transliteration: "Pengin Pāku" (Japanese: ペンギンパーク)	Tomoya Kitagawa	Daishirō Tanimura	Tomoya Kitagawa & Daiki Harashina	June 25, 2022	3.1%
Part 2
13	13	"Project Apple"; Transliteration: "Purojekuto <Appuru>" (Japanese: プロジェクト〈アップル〉)	Yūsuke Kubo	Honoka Katō	Yūsuke Kubo	October 1, 2022	3.6%
14	14	"Disarm the Time Bomb"; Transliteration: "Jigen Bakudan o Kaijo Seyo" (Japanese: 時限爆弾を解除せよ)	Takahiro Harada	Tomomi Kawaguchi	Takahiro Miura	October 8, 2022 (Note: This episode aired at 11:26 p.m. JST, 26 minutes after the original air time on TV Tokyo due to extended coverage of the 2022 World Team Table Tennis Championships China–Japan match. The unscheduled delay sparked an uproar among viewers, prompting TV Tokyo and its affiliates to rebroadcast the episode later in the week.)	2.6%
15	15	"A New Family Member"; Transliteration: "Atarashii Kazoku" (Japanese: 新しい家族)	Kenji Takahashi	Daishirō Tanimura	Takeyoshi Akane & Takashi Katagiri	October 15, 2022	3.3%
16	16	"Yor's Kitchen"; Transliteration: "Yoruzu Kitchin" (Japanese: ヨル's キッチン)	Haruka Tsuzuki	Honoka Katō	Haruka Tsuzuki	October 22, 2022	2.6%
16	16	"The Informant's Great Romance Plan"; Transliteration: "Jōhō-ya no Ren'ai Dai Sakusen" (Japanese: 情報屋の恋愛大作戦)	Haruka Tsuzuki	Honoka Katō	Haruka Tsuzuki	October 22, 2022	2.6%
17	17	"Carry Out the Griffin Plan"; Transliteration: "Gurihon Sakusen o Kekkō Seyo" (Japanese: ぐりほんさくせんを決行せよ)	Shū Honma	Honoka Katō	Shinsaku Sasaki	October 29, 2022	N/A
17	17	"Fullmetal Lady"; Transliteration: "<Furumetaru Redi>" (Japanese: 〈鋼鉄の淑女(フルメタルレディ)〉)	Shū Honma	Honoka Katō	Shinsaku Sasaki	October 29, 2022	N/A
17	17	"Omelet Rice♥"; Transliteration: "Omuraisu♡" (Japanese: オムライス♡)	Shū Honma	Honoka Katō	Shinsaku Sasaki	October 29, 2022	N/A
18	18	"Uncle the Private Tutor"; Transliteration: "Kateikyōshi no Oji" (Japanese: 家庭教師の叔父)	Ryō Kodama	Daishirō Tanimura	Ryō Kodama	November 5, 2022	2.8%
18	18	"Daybreak"; Transliteration: "<Shinonome>" (Japanese: 〈東雲(しののめ)〉)	Ryō Kodama	Daishirō Tanimura	Ryō Kodama	November 5, 2022	2.8%
19	19	"A Revenge Plot Against Desmond"; Transliteration: "Dezumondo e no Fukushū Keikaku" (Japanese: デズモンドへの復讐計画)	Hidekazu Hara	Rino Yamazaki	Hidekazu Hara	November 12, 2022	2.5%
19	19	"Mama Becomes the Wind"; Transliteration: "Haha, Kaze ni Naru" (Japanese: 母、風になる)	Hidekazu Hara	Ayumu Hisao	Hidekazu Hara	November 12, 2022	2.5%
20	20	"Investigate the General Hospital"; Transliteration: "Sōgō Byōin o Chōsa Seyo" (Japanese: 総合病院を調査せよ)	Yukiko Imai	Rino Yamazaki	Yukiko Imai	November 19, 2022	2.4%
20	20	"Decipher the Perplexing Code"; Transliteration: "Nankai na Angō o Kaidoku Seyo" (Japanese: 難解な暗号を解読せよ)	Yukiko Imai	Ayumu Hisao	Yukiko Imai	November 19, 2022	2.4%
21	21	"Nightfall"; Transliteration: "<Tobari>" (Japanese: 〈夜帷(とばり)〉)	Teruyuki Ōmine	Tomomi Kawaguchi	Teruyuki Ōmine	November 26, 2022	2.4%
21	21	"First Fit of Jealousy"; Transliteration: "Hajimete no Shitto" (Japanese: はじめての嫉妬)	Teruyuki Ōmine	Daishirō Tanimura	Teruyuki Ōmine	November 26, 2022	2.4%
22	22	"The Underground Tennis Tournament: The Campbelldon"; Transliteration: "Chika Tenisu Taikai Kyanberudon" (Japanese: 地下テニス大会 キャンベルドン)	Takahiro Harada	Honoka Katō	Takahiro Miura	December 3, 2022	N/A
23	23	"The Unwavering Path"; Transliteration: "Yuruganu Kidō" (Japanese: 揺るがぬ軌道)	Kenji Takahashi & Kazuki Horiguchi	Tomomi Kawaguchi	Mari Motohashi	December 10, 2022	2.2%
24	24	"The Role of a Mother and Wife"; Transliteration: "Haha-yaku to Tsuma-yaku" (Japanese: 母役と妻役)	Yōsuke Yamamoto & Tsurumi Mukōyama	Honoka Katō	Miyuki Kuroki	December 17, 2022	2.1%
24	24	"Shopping with Friends"; Transliteration: "Tomodachi to Kaimono" (Japanese: ともだちとかいもの)	Yōsuke Yamamoto & Tsurumi Mukōyama	Honoka Katō	Miyuki Kuroki	December 17, 2022	2.1%
25	25	"First Contact"; Transliteration: "Fāsuto Kontakuto" (Japanese: 接敵作戦(ファーストコンタクト))	Teruyuki Ōmine & Dai Ageo	Daishirō Tanimura	Kazuhiro Furuhashi	December 24, 2022 (Note: Episode 25 aired at 11:15 p.m. JST, 15 minutes after the original air time on TV Tokyo)	2.3%

=== Season 2 (2023) ===
No. overall	No. in season	Title	Directed by	Written by	Storyboarded by	Original release date	Viewership rating
26	1	"Follow Mama and Papa"; Transliteration: "Chichi to Haha o Bikō Seyo" (Japanese: ちちとははをびこうせよ)	Kazuhiro Furuhashi & Teruyuki Omine	Ayumu Hisao	Kazuhiro Furuhashi	October 7, 2023	3.0%
27	2	"Bond's Strategy to Stay Alive"; Transliteration: "Bondo no Seizon Senryaku" (Japanese: ボンドの生存戦略)	Miyuki Kuroki	Daishirō Tanimura	Miyuki Kuroki	October 14, 2023	3.0%
27	2	"Damian's Field Research Trip"; Transliteration: "Damian no Yagai Gakushū" (Japanese: ダミアンの野外学習)	Miyuki Kuroki	Ichirō Ōkouchi	Miyuki Kuroki	October 14, 2023	3.0%
28	3	"Mission and Family"; Transliteration: "Ninmu to Kazoku" (Japanese: 任務と家族)	Hayato Sakai	Ichirō Ōkouchi & Ayumu Hisao	Hayato Sakai	October 21, 2023	N/A
28	3	"The Elegant Bondman"; Transliteration: "Kareinaru Bondoman" (Japanese: 華麗なるボンドマン)	Hayato Sakai	Ichirō Ōkouchi & Ayumu Hisao	Hayato Sakai	October 21, 2023	N/A
28	3	"The Heart of a Child / Waking Up"; Transliteration: "Kodomo Kokoro / Mezamashi" (Japanese: 子ども心 / 目覚まし)	Hayato Sakai	Ichirō Ōkouchi & Ayumu Hisao	Hayato Sakai	October 21, 2023	N/A
29	4	"The Pastry of Knowledge"; Transliteration: "Chie no Kanmi" (Japanese: 知恵の甘味)	Yoshitsugu Hosokawa	Daishirō Tanimura	Makoto Fuchigami	October 28, 2023	2.6%
29	4	"The Informant's Great Romance Plan II"; Transliteration: "Jōhō-ya no Ren'ai Dai Sakusen II" (Japanese: 情報屋の恋愛大作戦II)	Yoshitsugu Hosokawa	Ayumu Hisao	Makoto Fuchigami	October 28, 2023	2.6%
30	5	"Plan to Cross the Border"; Transliteration: "Ekkyō Sakusen" (Japanese: 越境作戦)	Haruka Tsuzuki	Daishirō Tanimura	Haruka Tsuzuki	November 4, 2023	N/A
31	6	"The Fearsome Luxury Cruise Ship"; Transliteration: "Senritsu no Gōka Kyakusen" (Japanese: 戦慄の豪華客船)	Tsuyoshi Tobita	Daishirō Tanimura	Shinji Itadaki	November 11, 2023	N/A
32	7	"Who Is This Mission For?"; Transliteration: "Dare ga Tame no Ninmu" (Japanese: 誰がための任務)	Shōgo Ono	Daishirō Tanimura	Mamoru Kurosawa	November 18, 2023	2.8%
33	8	"The Symphony Upon the Ship"; Transliteration: "Senjō no Shinfonī" (Japanese: 船上の交響曲(シンフォニー))	Isao Hayashi	Daishirō Tanimura	Isao Hayashi & Yoshiki Kitai	November 25, 2023	2.4%
33	8	"Sis's Herb Tea"; Transliteration: "Ane no Hābutī" (Japanese: 姉のハーブティー)	Isao Hayashi	Daishirō Tanimura	Isao Hayashi & Yoshiki Kitai	November 25, 2023	2.4%
34	9	"The Hand That Connects to the Future"; Transliteration: "Mirai o Tsunagu Te" (Japanese: 未来を繋ぐ手)	Takahiro Harada & Ryōta Karasawa	Daishirō Tanimura	Isao Hayashi & Miyuki Kuroki	December 2, 2023	N/A
35	10	"Enjoy the Resort to the Fullest"; Transliteration: "Rizōto o Mankitsu Seyo" (Japanese: リゾートを満喫せよ)	Hayato Sakai	Rino Yamazaki	Hayato Sakai	December 9, 2023	2.3%
35	10	"Bragging About Vacation"; Transliteration: "Kyūka Jiman" (Japanese: 休暇自慢)	Hayato Sakai	Rino Yamazaki	Hayato Sakai	December 9, 2023	2.3%
36	11	"Berlint in Love"; Transliteration: "Bārinto Rabu" (Japanese: バーリント・ラブ)	Yōsuke Yamamoto	Honoka Katō	Koji Masunari & Takahiro Harada	December 16, 2023	N/A
36	11	"Nightfall's Daily Life"; Transliteration: "<Tobari> no Nichijō" (Japanese: 〈夜帷(とばり)〉の日常)	Yōsuke Yamamoto	Honoka Katō	Koji Masunari & Takahiro Harada	December 16, 2023	N/A
37	12	"Part of the Family"; Transliteration: "Kazoku no Ichiin" (Japanese: 家族の一員)	Yukiko Imai	Ayumu Isao	Yukiko Imai	December 23, 2023	N/A

=== Season 3 (2025) ===
No. overall	No. in season	Title	Directed by	Written by	Storyboarded by	Original release date	Viewership rating
38	1	"Berlint Panic"; Transliteration: "Bārinto Panikku" (Japanese: バーリント・パニック)	Yasuhiro Akamatsu	Aya Yajima & Honoka Katō	Kazuhiro Furuhashi & Takashi Katagiri	October 4, 2025	N/A
38	1	"The Informant and Nightfall"; Transliteration: "Jōhōya to Tobari" (Japanese: 情報屋と〈夜帷〉)	Yasuhiro Akamatsu	Aya Yajima & Honoka Katō	Kazuhiro Furuhashi & Takashi Katagiri	October 4, 2025	N/A
39	2	"Avoid Getting Tonitrus Bolts"; Transliteration: "Tonito wo Kaihi Seyo" (Japanese: 〈雷(トニト)〉を回避せよ)	Ayako Kurata	Rino Yamazaki	Ayako Kurata	October 11, 2025	N/A
39	2	"Twilight's Memories I"; Transliteration: "Twilight no Kioku I" (Japanese: 黄昏の記憶I)	Ayako Kurata	Rino Yamazaki	Ayako Kurata	October 11, 2025	N/A
40	3	"Twilight's Memories II"; Transliteration: "Twilight no Kioku II" (Japanese: 黄昏の記憶II)	Yukiko Imai	Rino Yamazaki	Yukiko Imai	October 18, 2025 (Note: This episode aired at 11:15 p.m. JST, 15 minutes after the regular air time on TV Tokyo.)	2.6%
41	4	"Behind the Scandal"; Transliteration: "Sukyandaru no Uragawa" (Japanese: スキャンダルの裏側)	Kenta Mimuro	Rino Yamazaki	Kenta Mimuro	October 25, 2025	N/A
41	4	"The Path to an Imperial Scholar"; Transliteration: "Inperiaru Sukarā e no Michi" (Japanese: インペリアル・スカラーへの道)	Kenta Mimuro	Rino Yamazaki	Kenta Mimuro	October 25, 2025	N/A
42	5	"The Mommy-Friends Scheme"; Transliteration: "Mama Tomo Sakusen" (Japanese: ママ友作戦)	Ryūichi Man'o	Rino Yamazaki	Tatsuyuki Nagai	November 1, 2025	N/A
43	6	"White Jealousy"; Transliteration: "Shiroi Shitto" (Japanese: 白い嫉妬)	Shinobu Sasaki	Erika Ando	Shinobu Sasaki	November 8, 2025	N/A
43	6	"The Eden College Busjacking Incident"; Transliteration: "Īden Kō Basujakku Jiken" (Japanese: イーデン校バスジャック事件)	Shinobu Sasaki	Erika Ando	Shinobu Sasaki	November 8, 2025	N/A
44	7	"The Red Circus"; Transliteration: "Akai Sākasu" (Japanese: 赤いサーカス)	Takahiro Harada	Erika Ando	Takahiro Harada	November 15, 2025	2.2%
45	8	"Take Down the Busjacker"; Transliteration: "Basu Jakku Han o Seiatsu Seyo" (Japanese: バスジャック犯を制圧せよ)	Keiko Oyamada & Yohei Shindo	Erika Ando	Yoko Kanamori	November 22, 2025	N/A
46	9	"Anya's Era Has Come"; Transliteration: "Anya no Jidai Kichatta" (Japanese: アーニャのじだいきちゃった)	Tsuyoshi Tobita	Erika Ando	Yukiko Imai	November 29, 2025	N/A
47	10	"Austin's Trouble"; Transliteration: "Ōsutin no Kunō" (Japanese: オースティンの苦悩)	Yumeko Iwaoka	Honoka Katō	Yumeko Iwaoka	December 7, 2025 (Note: This episode aired at 12:40 a.m. JST, 1 hour and 40 minutes after the regular air time on TV Tokyo.)	N/A
47	10	"A Normal Mixer"; Transliteration: "Futsū no Nomikai" (Japanese: フツーの飲み会)	Yumeko Iwaoka	Honoka Katō	Yumeko Iwaoka	December 7, 2025	N/A
47	10	"Moon Landing"; Transliteration: "Getsumen Chakuriku" (Japanese: げつめんちゃくりく)	Yumeko Iwaoka	Honoka Katō	Yumeko Iwaoka	December 7, 2025	N/A
48	11	"Extreme Level 3 Situation"; Transliteration: "Reberu 3 Hijō Jitai" (Japanese: レベル3非常事態)	Yoshiki Kitai	Honoka Katō	Yoshiki Kitai	December 13, 2025	N/A
49	12	"Battle to the Death in the Sewers"; Transliteration: "Gesuidō no Shitō" (Japanese: 下水道の死闘)	Yukiko Imai	Honoka Katō	Yukiko Imai	December 20, 2025	N/A
50	13	"A World Where We Cannot Survive"; Transliteration: "Ikinokorenai Sekai" (Japanese: 生き残れない世界)	Asami Nakatani	Honoka Katō	Yukiko Imai	December 27, 2025	N/A
