= Spy × Family season 1 =

First season of Spy × Family

Spy × Family
- Season 1
- Japanese cover art for the first home media volume of the season, featuring Loid Forger / Twilight
- No. of episodes: 25

Release
- Original network: TV Tokyo
- Original release: April 9 – December 24, 2022

Season chronology
- Next → Season 2

The first season of the Spy × Family anime television series was produced by Wit Studio and CloverWorks. The season is directed and written by Kazuhiro Furuhashi, with character designs by Kazuaki Shimada, who also serves as chief animation director along with Kyoji Asano. The music was composed and produced by (K)now Name. The anime was first announced in October 2021. The series follows master spy Twilight, who must disguise himself as psychiatrist Loid Forger and build a mock family in order to investigate political leader Donovan Desmond. Unbeknownst to him, his wife, Yor, is actually an assassin known as the Thorn Princess, while his daughter, Anya, has telepathic abilities.

The first season of the anime series consists of 25 episodes. The titles of its episodes are written as "Mission" with a number (e.g. "Mission 1", "Mission 2", etc.) which the counting continues across seasons. This naming convention follows the original manga's practice, which also uses "Mission" for chapter titles. This season adapts 38 main chapters of the manga, from Mission 1 to Mission 38, along with a couple of side stories: Extra Mission 1 and Short Mission 1 to 5.

The season was separated into two split season cours. The first part consists of 12 episodes and aired in Japan from April 9 to June 25, 2022, on TV Tokyo and other networks. The second part consists of 13 episodes and aired from October 1 to December 24, 2022. For the first part of the season: the first opening theme is directed by Masashi Ishihama and uses the song "Mixed Nuts" (ミックスナッツ) performed by Official Hige Dandism. The first ending theme is directed by Atsushi Nishigori and uses the song "Comedy" (喜劇, Kigeki) performed by Gen Hoshino. For the second part of the season: the second opening theme is directed by Tetsurō Araki and uses the song "Souvenir" performed by Bump of Chicken. The second ending theme is directed by Takayuki Hirao and uses the song "Shikisai" (色彩; lit. 'Color') performed by Yama.

The series is licensed for streaming by Crunchyroll outside of Asia, while it is distributed by Muse Communication in a selection of countries in South and Southeast Asia. (Note: The countries mentioned are Bangladesh, Bhutan, Brunei, Cambodia, India, Indonesia, Laos, Malaysia, Myanmar (Burma), Nepal, Philippines, Singapore, Thailand, Vietnam, and Pakistan)

== Episodes ==
No. overall	No. in season	Title	Directed by (Note: Production staff information is taken from the ending credits of each episode)	Written by	Storyboarded by	Original release date	Viewership rating
Part 1
1	1	"Operation Strix"; Transliteration: "Operēshon <Sutorikusu>" (Japanese: オペレーション〈梟(ストリクス)〉)	Kazuhiro Furuhashi	Tomomi Kawaguchi	Kazuhiro Furuhashi	April 9, 2022 (Note: Episodes 1 and 2 were pre-screened on April 1, 2022)	3.1%
In order to ease tensions between neighboring Westalis and Ostania, Westalis Intelligence (WISE) assigns agent "Twilight" to form a family in Ostania and get close to Donovan Desmond, leader of Ostania's National Unity Party. To do this, he must enroll his "child" into Eden Academy, where he can safely approach Donovan at an event. Twilight, under the identity of Loid Forger, adopts Anya, who secretly has telepathic abilities. While Loid is away, Anya accidentally reveals their location when sending a transmission to Edgar, a minister in Ostania, and is kidnapped. Loid rescues Anya and forces Edgar to withdraw. After passing the admission exam, the two of them are informed that stage two of acceptance into Eden Academy is a formal interview with both parents present.
2	2	"Secure a Wife"; Transliteration: "Tsuma-yaku o Kakuho Seyo" (Japanese: 妻役を確保せよ)	Takahiro Harada	Rino Yamazaki	Kazuhiro Furuhashi	April 16, 2022	2.7%
Yor Briar, a clerk at Berlint City Hall, is ostracized by her colleagues for being single, leading to a fear that her secret assassin job will be exposed as she is speculated to be a spy. At a tailor shop, Loid and Yor encounter each other, and they agree to form a partnership out of convenience. However, on the night Loid is supposed to attend a party with Yor, a side mission causes him to arrive late, and he accidentally introduces himself as her husband. After they leave, they are caught up by the pursuers from his earlier mission. Upon realizing how beneficial their partnership is to her assassin work, Yor asks if they could continue pretending they are married. Loid agrees, using a grenade pin as a ring while pledging their vows.
3	3	"Prepare for the Interview"; Transliteration: "Juken Taisaku o Seyo" (Japanese: 受験対策をせよ)	Takashi Katagiri	Daishirō Tanimura	Kazuhiro Furuhashi	April 23, 2022	N/A
Now legally married, Yor moves in with Loid and Anya. Because Anya and Yor fail the mock interview, Loid organizes a family outing to various cultural activities to give them a better idea of what upper-class family life is like. When he becomes distressed from losing faith in the success of his mission, Yor takes the family to a park to relax. There, they witness a thief robbing an old woman. After Loid, with help from Yor and Anya, apprehends him, the old woman observes that the Forgers make a wonderful family. That night, Loid conducts another mock interview with better results and reassures himself that if they could make the old woman think they are a family, then the mission still has a chance.
4	4	"The Prestigious School's Interview"; Transliteration: "Meimonkō Mensetsu Shiken" (Japanese: 名門校面接試験)	Kento Matsui	Rino Yamazaki	Tatsuyuki Nagai	April 30, 2022	N/A
As the Forgers arrive at Eden Academy for the interview, they impress Henry Henderson, one of the housemasters, as they overcome multiple screening efforts, including stopping an accidental stampede from the school's farm animals. During the interview with the housemasters, they give satisfactory answers, but Murdoch Swan, a divorcé, deliberately tries to taunt and fail them. With the family upset, Loid ends the interview. After the Forgers leave, Henderson punches Swan in defense of the Forgers. At home, Loid is certain they have failed the interview but agrees to leave the rest to luck with Yor and Anya's reassurance.
5	5	"Will They Pass or Fail?"; Transliteration: "Gōhi no Yukue" (Japanese: 合否の行方)	Kenji Takahashi	Tomomi Kawaguchi	Shinsaku Sasaki	May 7, 2022	2.7%
Despite failing the interview, Anya is first on the waiting list, thanks to Henderson's intervention, and is accepted into Eden Academy three days later. While celebrating Anya's acceptance with Franky, a drunken Franky spurs Anya into requesting Loid to reenact a rescue scene from her favorite cartoon, Spy Wars, as a reward. To satisfy her demands, Loid uses WISE's resources to rent a castle and drafts his fellow agents in her reenactment games. After passing through all obstacles and fighting with a drunken Yor, Loid "rescues" Anya, with Anya promising to do her best at school for Loid's sake. Note: Ayumu Hisao serves as a literature consultant for this episode
6	6	"The Friendship Scheme"; Transliteration: "Nakayoshi Sakusen" (Japanese: ナカヨシ作戦)	Yōsuke Yamamoto	Daishirō Tanimura	Yōsuke Yamamoto	May 14, 2022	2.6%
WISE's second phase of Operation Strix involves making Anya an Imperial Scholar to infiltrate the school's gathering and reach Donovan. To do so, Anya must earn eight Stella Stars while avoiding receiving eight Tonitrus Bolts, which is equivalent to an expulsion. While shopping, Yor saves Anya from being kidnapped and agrees to teach her self-defense. On orientation day, Loid secretly arranges for Anya to be in the same class as Damian Desmond, Donovan's second son, as an alternate plan to get her to befriend him. However, during the school tour, Damian's constant bullying of Anya leads her to punch him, earning her a Tonitrus Bolt and souring her relationship with Damian, spoiling both of Loid's plans.
7	7	"The Target's Second Son"; Transliteration: "Tāgetto no Jinan" (Japanese: 標的(ターゲット)の次男)	Kazuki Horiguchi	Tomomi Kawaguchi	Kazuhiro Furuhashi	May 21, 2022	2.5%
Loid continuously pressures Anya to apologize to Damian despite her new friend, Becky Blackbell, discouraging her. Once Anya is able to do so while Becky is away, Damian realizes he has started to develop feelings for her, but he rejects her apology out of embarrassment. Believing his second plan to have failed, Loid urges Anya to study per WISE's original plan, overwhelming her. Yor helps Loid realize he has been pressuring Anya too much, and when he checks on her, he finds her asleep while studying. As Loid questions how it feels to have a family, elsewhere, Yuri Briar, Yor's brother, learns of his sister's marriage.
8	8	"The Counter-Secret Police Cover Operation"; Transliteration: "Taihimitsu Keisatsu Gisō Sakusen" (Japanese: 対秘密警察偽装作戦)	Yukiko Imai	Rino Yamazaki	Yukiko Imai	May 28, 2022	2.8%
In the evening of the next day, Yuri, who secretly works for the Ostanian State Security Service (SSS), visits Yor after interrogating a WISE informant from within the City Council. Yuri, who is deeply attached to Yor, struggles to accept her marriage and barrages Loid with questions to catch him off guard. Realizing that Yuri is following a conversation template used by the Ostanian Intelligence Agency, Loid deduces that he is a member of the SSS. An inebriated Yuri then requests that the couple kiss in front of him after seeing them act uncomfortable from touching hands, threatening to annul their marriage if they fail to do so.
9	9	"Show Off How in Love You Are"; Transliteration: "Rabu Rabu o Misetsukeyo" (Japanese: ラブラブを見せつけよ)	Takashi Katagiri	Honoka Katō	Takashi Katagiri	June 4, 2022	2.7%
Yuri attempts to stop the kiss after having second thoughts and receives a slap from a drunk and embarrassed Yor. Ultimately, Yuri refuses to accept the marriage, albeit recognizing Loid's good nature. Loid begins to suspect Yor's connection with the SSS, while Yor is insecure about her incompetence as a wife. The next day, Loid follows Yor and disguises himself and Franky as SSS officers to extract information from her, but she conclusively clears their doubt. Loid later meets Yor on the way home and advises her to stay true to herself without fretting about her façade as his wife. A relieved Yor expresses her happiness and appreciation for being Loid's partner.
10	10	"The Great Dodgeball Plan"; Transliteration: "Dojjibōru Daisakusen" (Japanese: ドッジボール大作戦)	Kenji Takahashi	Daishirō Tanimura	Kenji Takahashi	June 11, 2022	2.8%
Anya and Damian hear a rumor about a Stella Star being given to the most valuable player in the upcoming dodgeball tournament. On the day of the tournament, Anya and Damian's class faces the athletically gifted Bill Watkins, who eliminates everyone except them. Damian sacrifices his chance of winning a Stella Star to protect Anya. As the last-standing player, Anya uses her training from Yor to make the final throw but fails, losing the game. Ultimately, the rumor is false, while Anya and Damian's relationship sees little improvement.
11	11	"Stella"; Transliteration: "<Sutera>" (Japanese: 〈星(ステラ)〉)	Toshifumi Akai	Rino Yamazaki	Toshifumi Akai	June 18, 2022	3.0%
Loid takes Anya to volunteer at a hospital, hoping to earn Stella Stars through community service. However, her poor performance angers the staff and leads to their dismissal. By chance, Anya detects a drowning patient's distressing thoughts and rushes to save him, ultimately earning her the first Stella Star. At Eden Academy, her classmates spread false rumors about her deeds, although Damian publicly defends her integrity. Listening to Becky and planning to get close to Damian, Anya asks her parents for a dog, to which they agree. Elsewhere, a genetically altered white dog suddenly visualizes the Forgers in his mind.
12	12	"Penguin Park"; Transliteration: "Pengin Pāku" (Japanese: ペンギンパーク)	Tomoya Kitagawa	Daishirō Tanimura	Tomoya Kitagawa & Daiki Harashina	June 25, 2022	3.1%
After working tirelessly on extra side missions, Loid takes Anya and Yor to Berlint Aquarium to convince his neighbors that they are a happy family. However, while there, he is forced to undertake another mission to retrieve a microfilm containing chemical weapon plans that a penguin is smuggling. Anya secretly helps Loid locate the microfilm-carrying penguin and tricks Yor into apprehending the recipient. Successfully retrieving the microfilm and appeasing his neighbors, Loid gives Anya a penguin plushie. Sometime later at home, Anya roleplays a spy mission with her toys. After Loid and Yor reprimand her for attempting to enter their rooms, they are forced to play along to cheer her up.
Part 2
13	13	"Project Apple"; Transliteration: "Purojekuto <Appuru>" (Japanese: プロジェクト〈アップル〉)	Yūsuke Kubo	Honoka Katō	Yūsuke Kubo	October 1, 2022	3.6%
While purchasing a dog for Anya, Loid is called away to an urgent mission to stop a terrorist group of Ostanian students, led by Keith Kepler, who plan to use dogs as bomb carriers to assassinate Westalian Foreign Minister Brantz. Meanwhile, at an animal adoption fair, Anya reads into the mind of a white dog and receives a vision of her family. Intrigued, she follows the dog alone and ends up in the terrorists' hideout. The dog helps her escape, and Anya realizes he can predict the future. Keith corners them, but Yor intervenes, believing him to be a child trafficker.
14	14	"Disarm the Time Bomb"; Transliteration: "Jigen Bakudan o Kaijo Seyo" (Japanese: 時限爆弾を解除せよ)	Takahiro Harada	Tomomi Kawaguchi	Takahiro Miura	October 8, 2022 (Note: This episode aired at 11:26 p.m. JST, 26 minutes after the original air time on TV Tokyo due to extended coverage of the 2022 World Team Table Tennis Championships China–Japan match. The unscheduled delay sparked an uproar among viewers, prompting TV Tokyo and its affiliates to rebroadcast the episode later in the week.)	2.6%
Keith is forced to flee, and as WISE arrests the other students, he takes the last bomb dog and rigs his last hideout's door with a bomb. Anya learns through the dog's future vision that Loid will die from it. Running away from Yor, they arrive at the bomb location and prevent his death by writing a warning outside. Afterwards, Loid disguises himself as Minister Brantz, cutting loose from the Secret Police by car and tricking Keith into following him toward the river. During the chase, Keith releases the bomb dog after Loid, beginning their confrontation.
15	15	"A New Family Member"; Transliteration: "Atarashii Kazoku" (Japanese: 新しい家族)	Kenji Takahashi	Daishirō Tanimura	Takeyoshi Akane & Takashi Katagiri	October 15, 2022	3.3%
Loid manages to lock the bomb dog in a dumpster and throw the bomb into the river, where it explodes harmlessly. Keith flees the scene but crashes his car with a kick from Yor, who is looking for Anya. With the terrorism incident resolved, Loid returns to his family, and they decide to adopt the white dog with Sylvia's approval. The next day, Anya fails to impress Damian with her new dog. Noticing the similarities in appearances and actions between the dog and her favorite fictional hero, Bondman, Anya decides to name the new Forger family member "Bond".
16	16	"Yor's Kitchen"; Transliteration: "Yoruzu Kitchin" (Japanese: ヨル's キッチン)	Haruka Tsuzuki	Honoka Katō	Haruka Tsuzuki	October 22, 2022	2.6%
16	16	"The Informant's Great Romance Plan"; Transliteration: "Jōhō-ya no Ren'ai Dai Sakusen" (Japanese: 情報屋の恋愛大作戦)	Haruka Tsuzuki	Honoka Katō	Haruka Tsuzuki	October 22, 2022	2.6%
"Yor's Kitchen": Worried about losing her family, Yor seeks help from Camilla, Dominic, and Yuri to improve her cooking and finally learns how to cook a stew dish from her childhood. Later at home, after cooking the stew for Loid and Anya, Yor realizes she has grown fond of them. "The Informant's Great Romance Plan": Franky falls in love and requests Loid's help. Despite rehearsing his confession, he is rejected, and Loid cheers him up at the bar, reminding him that they cannot have relationships anyway due to the nature of their profession.
17	17	"Carry Out the Griffin Plan"; Transliteration: "Gurihon Sakusen o Kekkō Seyo" (Japanese: ぐりほんさくせんを決行せよ)	Shū Honma	Honoka Katō	Shinsaku Sasaki	October 29, 2022	N/A
17	17	"Fullmetal Lady"; Transliteration: "<Furumetaru Redi>" (Japanese: 〈鋼鉄の淑女(フルメタルレディ)〉)	Shū Honma	Honoka Katō	Shinsaku Sasaki	October 29, 2022	N/A
17	17	"Omelet Rice♥"; Transliteration: "Omuraisu♡" (Japanese: オムライス♡)	Shū Honma	Honoka Katō	Shinsaku Sasaki	October 29, 2022	N/A
"Carry Out the Griffin Plan": When Anya fails to connect with Damian through Bond, she schemes to win his favor by helping him during the arts and crafts contest, which he hopes to win to impress his father. Anya turns Damian's griffin sculpture into a disaster, but he still wins first prize. "Fullmetal Lady": Sylvia's daily life as a spy is shown as she evades the SSS to meet with Twilight and discuss Operation Strix. "Omelet Rice♥": In a post-credits scene, a flashback shows Yor cooking for Yuri, explaining how Yuri has developed such a durable constitution.
18	18	"Uncle the Private Tutor"; Transliteration: "Kateikyōshi no Oji" (Japanese: 家庭教師の叔父)	Ryō Kodama	Daishirō Tanimura	Ryō Kodama	November 5, 2022	2.8%
18	18	"Daybreak"; Transliteration: "<Shinonome>" (Japanese: 〈東雲(しののめ)〉)	Ryō Kodama	Daishirō Tanimura	Ryō Kodama	November 5, 2022	2.8%
"Uncle the Private Tutor": Anya realizes her midterm exams take place during the new moon when her telepathy does not work, and she cannot cheat. Yor invites Yuri to tutor her, and while they make no progress, Anya becomes inspired to study to help Loid with his missions. "Daybreak": Nervous about Anya's exam results, Loid sneaks into the school's vault to alter her answers. At the same time, he encounters an amateur spy named Daybreak, who is trying to sabotage the Desmond brothers' answers. Loid secretly undoes Daybreak's sabotage and notices that Anya had barely passed on her own.
19	19	"A Revenge Plot Against Desmond"; Transliteration: "Dezumondo e no Fukushū Keikaku" (Japanese: デズモンドへの復讐計画)	Hidekazu Hara	Rino Yamazaki	Hidekazu Hara	November 12, 2022	2.5%
19	19	"Mama Becomes the Wind"; Transliteration: "Haha, Kaze ni Naru" (Japanese: 母、風になる)	Hidekazu Hara	Ayumu Hisao	Hidekazu Hara	November 12, 2022	2.5%
"A Revenge Plot Against Desmond": Anya foils George Glooman's plans to get Damian expelled as revenge for putting his family's company out of business and forcing him to quit school. After gaining his classmates' sympathy, they send George off with a heartfelt farewell. However, that night, George learns that his family's company is not being shut down, and he returns to school the next day, greatly embarrassed. "Mama Becomes the Wind": After sending Anya off to school, Yor suspects she left her gym clothes behind and rushes off to the school to deliver them, only to discover there is no gym class on that day. Loid meets up with Yor and invites her to lunch to improve her mood.
20	20	"Investigate the General Hospital"; Transliteration: "Sōgō Byōin o Chōsa Seyo" (Japanese: 総合病院を調査せよ)	Yukiko Imai	Rino Yamazaki	Yukiko Imai	November 19, 2022	2.4%
20	20	"Decipher the Perplexing Code"; Transliteration: "Nankai na Angō o Kaidoku Seyo" (Japanese: 難解な暗号を解読せよ)	Yukiko Imai	Ayumu Hisao	Yukiko Imai	November 19, 2022	2.4%
"Investigate the General Hospital": For a school report on a career she is interested in, Anya accompanies Loid to learn about his cover job as a psychiatrist. While Loid is away meeting with a WISE agent, Anya sneaks into his office and into his secret escape tunnel, accidentally scaring the other doctors. Anya then gives her report to the class, misleadingly painting Loid's work in a bad light. "Decipher the Perplexing Code": Inspired by an episode of Spy Wars, Anya creates a secret code that tells whoever decodes it to meet at a bridge at 08:00 on Saturday and passes it to all her friends. Only Franky decodes it, believing it to be a secret love letter, and goes to the bridge while Anya sleeps through her alarm.
21	21	"Nightfall"; Transliteration: "<Tobari>" (Japanese: 〈夜帷(とばり)〉)	Teruyuki Ōmine	Tomomi Kawaguchi	Teruyuki Ōmine	November 26, 2022	2.4%
21	21	"First Fit of Jealousy"; Transliteration: "Hajimete no Shitto" (Japanese: はじめての嫉妬)	Teruyuki Ōmine	Daishirō Tanimura	Teruyuki Ōmine	November 26, 2022	2.4%
"Nightfall": Nightfall, a WISE agent under the alias Fiona Frost, visits the Forgers to notify Loid that they will be working together for their next mission. Fiona, who is also secretly in love with Loid, also came with the intention of replacing Yor. However, after realizing Loid is genuinely happy with Yor and Anya, she goes home dejectedly. "First Fit of Jealousy": Bond becomes jealous of Anya's stuffed penguin and destroys it, upsetting her. Loid repairs it and convinces Anya to forgive Bond.
22	22	"The Underground Tennis Tournament: The Campbelldon"; Transliteration: "Chika Tenisu Taikai Kyanberudon" (Japanese: 地下テニス大会 キャンベルドン)	Takahiro Harada	Honoka Katō	Takahiro Miura	December 3, 2022	N/A
Loid and Fiona disguise themselves as a married couple and participate in an underground tennis tournament hosted by Cavi Campbell to win a painting that contains the location of a dossier, whose contents, if revealed, might reignite the war. Fiona wants to take this opportunity to show Loid how capable she is to replace Yor's role in Operation Strix. They defeat all their opponents and reach the finals against Campbell's children; however, Campbell rigs the tournament to give his children the advantage. Meanwhile, Yor is worried about the relationship between her husband and Fiona.
23	23	"The Unwavering Path"; Transliteration: "Yuruganu Kidō" (Japanese: 揺るがぬ軌道)	Kenji Takahashi & Kazuki Horiguchi	Tomomi Kawaguchi	Mari Motohashi	December 10, 2022	2.2%
Loid and Fiona overcome all the cheating tricks the Campbells throw at them and win the tournament. Afterwards, the pair cleverly switch places and steal the targeted painting before the SSS arrive. By chance, they meet Yor, Anya, and Bond at the park, where Fiona promptly challenges Yor to a tennis match, hoping to prove herself a more worthy partner than Yor. However, Yor, thanks to her inhuman strength, completely demolishes Fiona, but the incident still leaves Yor unhappy and troubled. Sometime later, Loid learns, to his confusion, that the "warmonger dossier" is just a misunderstanding.
24	24	"The Role of a Mother and Wife"; Transliteration: "Haha-yaku to Tsuma-yaku" (Japanese: 母役と妻役)	Yōsuke Yamamoto & Tsurumi Mukōyama	Honoka Katō	Miyuki Kuroki	December 17, 2022	2.1%
24	24	"Shopping with Friends"; Transliteration: "Tomodachi to Kaimono" (Japanese: ともだちとかいもの)	Yōsuke Yamamoto & Tsurumi Mukōyama	Honoka Katō	Miyuki Kuroki	December 17, 2022	2.1%
"The Role of a Mother and Wife": Yor believes that Loid will replace her with Fiona, raising rumors and worrying Loid, who immediately arranges a date to clear the issue. The date ends when Loid attempts to seduce a drunk Yor, and she knocks him out in panic. They later have a talk, where Loid reassures Yor about their marriage, making it clear that he is not going to replace her, and the two reconcile. "Shopping with Friends": Becky takes Anya shopping at an exclusive high-class shopping mall for Anya to get Damian's attention. Becky goes on a shopping spree, whereas Anya only gets a matching set of keychains and gifts one to Becky to commemorate the day, making Becky very happy. Becky's butler, Martha, is glad the once haughty and unsociable Becky has found a friend in Anya.
25	25	"First Contact"; Transliteration: "Fāsuto Kontakuto" (Japanese: 接敵作戦(ファーストコンタクト))	Teruyuki Ōmine & Dai Ageo	Daishirō Tanimura	Kazuhiro Furuhashi	December 24, 2022 (Note: Episode 25 aired at 11:15 p.m. JST, 15 minutes after the original air time on TV Tokyo)	2.3%
Loid infiltrates Eden Academy on the day of the Imperial Scholar social gathering, where Donovan Desmond is attending, and learns that Damian is going to meet his father after the gathering. He uses the chance to contact Donovan and probe him for intel. Although unsuccessful, he manages to catch a glimpse into Donovan's psyche and make an impression on his target while defending Damian's feelings. After Loid departs, Damian finally converses with Donovan and receives faint praise for his academic achievements.

== Home media release ==
=== Japanese ===
Toho Animation (Japan – Region 2/A)
Volume	Episodes	Cover character	Release date	Ref.
1	Mission 1–4	Loid Forger	July 20, 2022	
2	Mission 5–8	Anya Forger	September 21, 2022	
3	Mission 9–12	Yor Forger	November 16, 2022	
4	Mission 13–16	Bond Forger	January 18, 2023	
5	Mission 17–20	Yuri Briar	March 15, 2023	
6	Mission 21–25	Fiona Frost	May 17, 2023	

=== English ===
Crunchyroll, LLC (North America – Region 1/A)
Volumes		Episodes	Cover character	Release date	Ref.
Season 1	1	Mission 1–12	Loid Forger, Anya Forger and Yor Forger (primary / alternate cover)	August 9, 2023	
Season 1	2	Mission 13–25	Loid Forger (primary cover) and Anya Forger (alternate cover)	February 13, 2024	
