= Spy × Family (TV series) =

Japanese anime television series

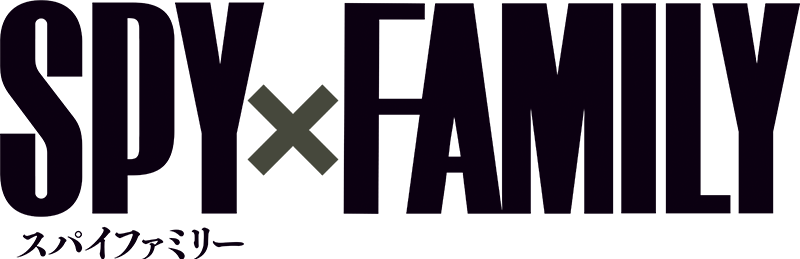
- Genre: Action; Spy comedy; Slice of life
- Based on: Tatsuya Endo
- Created by: Spy × Family
- Directed by: Kazuhiro Furuhashi (S1–2); Takahiro Harada (S2); Yukiko Imai (S3); Yasuhiro Akamatsu (S4)
- Series composition: Kazuhiro Furuhashi (S1); Ichirō Ōkouchi (S2); Rino Yamazaki (S3); Aya Takaha (S4)
- Music by: (K)now Name
- Voices of: Takuya Eguchi; Atsumi Tanezaki; Saori Hayami; Kenichirou Matsuda (Note: As a narrator)
- Opening themes: "Mixed Nuts" by Official Hige Dandism (S1A); "Souvenir" by Bump of Chicken (S1B); "Kura Kura" by Ado (S2); "Hi o Mamoru" by Spitz (S3)
- Ending themes: "Comedy" by Gen Hoshino (S1A); "Color" by Yama (S1B); "Todome no Ichigeki" by Vaundy (S2); "Actor" by Lilas Ikuta (S3)
- No. of seasons: 3
- No. of episodes: 50 (list of episodes)

Production
- Cinematographers: Akane Fushihara (S1, S4); Yūya Sakuma (S2–3)
- Editors: Akari Saito (S1–2, S4); Rina Koguchi (S3)
- Studios: Wit Studio; CloverWorks
- Producers: Maasa Murakami; Masaya Saitō; Mirai Yamauchi; Takako Yamamori; Tetsuya Nakatake; Yūichi Fukushima
- Production companies: Spy × Family Project (Note: Label consisting of various companies.)
- Runtime: 24 minutes

Original release
- Network: TV Tokyo
- Release: 9 April 2022 – present

Related
- Spy × Family Code: White

Spy × Family (stylized as SPY×FAMILY and pronounced "spy family") (Note: X letter in Japan is a symbol for "meets".) is a Japanese anime television series produced by Wit Studio and CloverWorks, based on the manga series Spy × Family by Tatsuya Endo. The series broadcasts on TV Tokyo and its TXN affiliates in Japan. It has been streamed by Crunchyroll outside of Asia. The series is distributed by Muse Communication in the rest of the Asia-Pacific region. It follows master spy Twilight, who must disguise himself as psychiatrist Loid Forger and build a mock family in order to investigate political leader Donovan Desmond. Unbeknownst to him, his wife, Yor, is actually an assassin known as the Thorn Princess, while his adoptive daughter, Anya, has telepathic abilities.

The series has received critical acclaim for its storytelling, humor, action sequences, characters, animation, voice acting, and world-building, as well as numerous awards, including Animation of the Year at the Tokyo Anime Award Festival. A feature film based on the series, Spy × Family Code: White, was released in Japan in December 2023 to positive reviews. A second theatrical film is set to be released in 2027.

== Episodes ==
Season	Episodes		Originally released	
Season	Episodes		First released	Last released
1	25	12	9 April 2022	25 June 2022
1	25	13	1 October 2022	24 December 2022
2	12		7 October 2023	23 December 2023
3	13		4 October 2025	27 December 2025

== Cast and characters ==
Character	Japanese	English
Main characters
Loid Forger (ロイド・フォージャー, Roido Fōjā) / Twilight (黄昏, Tasogare)	Takuya Eguchi	Alex Organ
Anya Forger (アーニャ・フォージャー, Ānya Fōjā)	Atsumi Tanezaki	Megan Shipman; Bryn Apprill (Season 2) (Note: Bryn Apprill temporarily replaced Megan Shipman for the role of Anya Forger in season 2.)
Yor Forger (ヨル・フォージャー, Yoru Fōjā) née Briar (ブライア, Buraia) / Thorn Princess (いばら姫, Ibara Hime)	Saori Hayami	Natalie Van Sistine
Bond Forger (ボンド・フォージャー, Bondo Fōjā)	Kenichirou Matsuda	Tyler Walker
Secondary characters
Franky Franklin (フランキー・フランクリン, Furankī Furankurin)	Hiroyuki Yoshino	Anthony Bowling
Sylvia Sherwood (シルヴィア・シャーウッド, Shiruvia Shāuddo) / Handler (管理官(ハンドラー), Handorā)	Yūko Kaida	Stephanie Young
Henry Henderson (ヘンリー・ヘンダーソン, Henrī Hendāson)	Kazuhiro Yamaji	Barry Yandell
Yuri Briar (ユーリ・ブライア, Yūri Buraia)	Kensho Ono (adult); Mirei Kumagai (young)	Dallas Reid (adult); Sarah Wiedenheft (young)
Damian Desmond (ダミアン・デズモンド, Damian Dezumondo)	Natsumi Fujiwara	Caitlin Glass
Becky Blackbell (ベッキー・ブラックベル, Bekkī Burakkuberu)	Emiri Katō	Dani Chambers
Fiona Frost (フィオナ・フロスト, Fiona Furosuto) / Nightfall (夜帷, Tobari)	Ayane Sakura	Lindsay Seidel (Note: Bryn Apprill temporarily replaced Lindsay Seidel for the role of Fiona in season 1, episode 21.)
Narrator	Kenichirou Matsuda (Note: Kenichirou Matsuda also voices Bond Forger.)	Ben Phillips
Supporting characters
Camilla (カミラ, Kamira)	Umeka Shōji	Morgan Lauré
Millie (ミリー, Mirī)	Manaka Iwami	Katelyn Barr
Sharon (シャロン, Sharon)	Mirei Kumagai	Leah Clark
Dominic (ドミニック, Dominikku)	Shōhei Kajikawa	Jordan Dash Cruz
Emile Elman (エミール・エルマン, Emīru Eruman)	Hana Sato	Macy Anne Johnson
Ewen Egeburg (ユーイン・エッジバーグ, Yūin Ejjibāgu)	Haruka Okamura	Michelle Rojas
Shopkeeper (店長, Tenchō)	Junichi Suwabe	Jim Foronda
Donovan Desmond (ドノバン・デズモンド, Donoban Dezumondo)	Takaya Hashi	John Burgmeier

== Production ==
=== Season 1 ===
Produced by Wit Studio and CloverWorks, the first season of Spy × Family was broadcast on TV Tokyo in 25 episodes divided into two parts. The first part, consisting of 12 episodes, aired from 9 April to 25 June 2022, and the second part, the last 13 episodes, aired from 1 October to 24 December 2022. The first season was directed by Kazuhiro Furuhashi, with music by (K)now Name, character designs by Kazuaki Shimada, while Kazuaki Shimada and Kyoji Asano are chief animation directors. It was first announced in October 2021.

Following the chapter naming practice of the original manga, the episode titles in the anime series are written as "Mission" with a number (e.g. "Mission 1", "Mission 2", etc.) which the counting continues to the subsequent seasons. This season adapts 38 main chapters of the manga, from Mission 1 to Mission 38, along with a couple of side stories: Extra Mission 1 and Short Mission 1 to 5.

=== Season 2 ===
In December 2022, a second season and a theatrical film were announced at the Jump Festa 2023 event. Ichirō Ōkouchi is replacing Furuhashi as scriptwriter, with the remaining staff and cast reprising their roles. The second season, consisting of 12 episodes, aired from 7 October to 23 December 2023.

Continued from last season, the season starts with "Mission 26" and adapts 21 main chapters of the manga, from Mission 39 to Mission 59, along with a couple of side stories: Extra Mission 2 and Short Mission 6 to 7.

=== Season 3 ===
On 9 June 2024, a third season was announced at the Spy × Family Anime Extra Mission special event. Yukiko Imai is replacing Furuhashi and Takahiro Harada as the season's director, while the remaining staff and cast reprising their roles. It aired from 4 October to 27 December 2025.

Continued from last season, the season starts with "Mission 38" and adapts 26 main chapters of the manga, from Mission 60 to Mission 87, along with a side story: Short Mission 10.

=== Season 4 ===
On November 8, 2026, a fourth season was announced at the Spy × Family Anime Extra Mission II special event. Yasuhiro Akamatsu replaced Imai as the season's director, with Aya Takaha handled the series' composition, and character designs by Kazuaki Shimada and Satoshi Kawadaki. It is set to premiere in 2027.

=== International release and distribution ===
This series is licensed by Crunchyroll (Note: The countries and regions mentioned on the list are North America, specifically the United States and Canada; United Kingdom, Ireland for British Isles; Europe outside of the British Isles and Quebec; Australia and New Zealand; and Latin America.) along with streaming and home video, while it is distributed by Muse Communication in a selection of countries in Asia-Pacific. (Note: The countries mentioned are Bangladesh, Bhutan, Brunei, Cambodia, India, Indonesia, Laos, Malaysia, Myanmar (Burma), Nepal, Philippines, Singapore, Thailand, Vietnam, and Pakistan.) In other instances, Netflix handles distribution in the Asia-Pacific.

== Music ==
The music of the Spy × Family anime series was composed and produced by (K)now Name. The opening theme for the first part of the first season uses the song "Mixed Nuts" (ミックスナッツ, Mikkusu Natsu) by Official Hige Dandism and is directed by Masashi Ishihama; while the ending theme uses the song "Comedy" (喜劇, Kigeki) by Gen Hoshino and is directed by Atsushi Nishigori. The opening theme for the second part uses the song "Souvenir" by Bump of Chicken and is directed by Tetsurō Araki; while and the ending theme uses the song "Shikisai" (色彩; lit. "Color") by Yama and is directed by Takayuki Hirao. The second season's opening theme uses the song "Kura Kura" (クラクラ; lit. "Dizzy") by Ado and is directed by Masaaki Yuasa. The ending theme uses the song "Todome no Ichigeki" (トドメの一撃; lit. "Finishing Strike") by Vaundy (feat. Cory Wong) and is directed by Eugene Winter. The third season's opening theme uses the song "Hi o Mamoru" (灯を護る; lit. "Protect the Light") by Spitz and is directed by Shingo Natsume. The ending theme uses the song "Actor" by Lilas Ikuta.

The music of the movie Spy × Family Code: White was also composed and produced by (K)now_Name. On 30 October 2023, the anime social media announced "Soulsoup" by Official Hige Dandism as the main theme song. On the premiere day, they revealed the song "Why" (光の跡, Hikari no Ato; lit. "Trail of Light"), performed by Gen Hoshino, was used for the ending theme.

== Home media release ==
=== Japanese ===
Toho Animation (Japan – Region 2/A)
Volume		Episodes	Cover character	Release date	Ref.
Season 1	1	Mission 1–4	Loid Forger	20 July 2022	
Season 1	2	Mission 5–8	Anya Forger	21 September 2022	
Season 1	3	Mission 9–12	Yor Forger	16 November 2022	
Season 1	4	Mission 13–16	Bond Forger	18 January 2023	
Season 1	5	Mission 17–20	Yuri Briar	15 March 2023	
Season 1	6	Mission 21–25	Fiona Frost	17 May 2023	
Season 2	1	Mission 26–29	Anya Forger, Damian Desmond and Becky Blackbell	20 December 2023	
Season 2	2	Mission 30–33	Yor Forger, Loid Forger, Anya Forger and Bond Forger	21 February 2024	
Season 2	3	Mission 34–37	Loid Forger, Anya Forger, Yor Forger, Yuri Briar and Fiona Frost	17 April 2024	
Season 3	1	Mission 38–43	Anya Forger and Bond Forger	18 February 2026	
Season 3	2	Mission 44–50	Loid Forger and Yor Forger	20 May 2026	

=== English ===
Crunchyroll, LLC (North America – Region 1/A)
Volume		Episodes	Cover character	Release date	Ref.
Season 1	1	Mission 1–12	Loid Forger, Anya Forger and Yor Forger (primary / alternate cover)	9 August 2023	
Season 1	2	Mission 13–25	Loid Forger (primary cover) and Anya Forger (alternate cover)	13 February 2024	
Season 2		Mission 26–37	Loid Forger, Anya Forger, Yor Forger and Bond Forger (primary / alternate cover)	18 March 2025	

== Reception ==
=== Popularity ===
The anime had received high TV rating percentage since its release in April 2022, until the end of its first season. With the premiere of its second cours on 1 October 2022, Spy × Family sets a new record for TV Tokyo in time shift audience ratings. The president of TV Tokyo reveals that the series' second part was the "best among all programs on all stations for the July 2022 season", including the first episode of the second cours into July quarter's statistics. Its debut episode was the second most watched in Japanese streaming site. The series took second place in April and later rose and remained in the first place for the next three months (from May to July) in the Japanese monthly streaming rank lists and VOD rank lists, despite the fact that the anime stopped releasing new episodes in July.

Spy × Family has also started gaining mainstream popularity with a wide range of age groups, from children to adults. An official from Takara Tomy Arts said: "[the series] is popular among a wide range of people, just like Demon Slayer: Kimetsu no Yaiba. Anya is particularly popular. It is likely that there will be even more toys and goods in the future, including products for children." Anya's popularity led to Toho make a music video heavily featuring her. Additionally, a Tamagotchi involving Anya was released in June 2022.

In a survey conducted by FinT, Spy × Family and Anya were ranked first and fourth respectively, on the top trending things among Generation Z in Japan for 2022. In the same survey, "Anya likes peanuts" (アーニャピーナッツが好き) was the no. 1 trending phrase of the year in part due to a mash-up with the song "Renai Circulation" on TikTok.

Spy x Family ranked as the most-watched anime title in the fourth quarter of 2025 in Japan. The series was also the most-watched title on Netflix Japan from 2021–2025, surpassing other anime series such as The Apothecary Diaries, Demon Slayer: Kimetsu no Yaiba, and Dandadan.

=== Critical response ===
The series has met critical acclaim. On review aggregator website Rotten Tomatoes, the first season of Spy × Family holds an approval rating of 100% based on six reviews, with an average rating of 9/10. The reviewers of Anime News Network praised the first episode of the series. Caitlin Moore and James Beckett gave it a perfect score; Moore lauded the show for its "consistent sense of comic timing" which perfectly deliver each joke and calling it a "guaranteed crowd-pleaser and a solid choice for almost everyone," while Beckett wrote that the "breakout star of the show" is Anya though what made him won over the show is its heart. Nicholas Dupree noted that "[the show] operates in a very precarious space between a goofy comedy of coincidences and a serious spy thriller, where the result is a world that mostly runs on cartoon logic." Richard Eisenbeis described Anya as a "fantastic little character" while praising the anime for its characters and world-building. Rebecca Silverman, similar to all of her manga reviews, she called Anya as the "beating heart of the series" while praising the anime for its story and animation.

Kambole Campbell of Polygon noting about Twilight's parenthood to Anya. While the action isn't particularly flashy, Campbell found that the animation in those moments is quite pleasing, and the choreography is precise and snappy. Rafael Motamayor of IGN praised the show for its comedy, action, animation, characters, and poignant commentary on family and class. He also compare Anya to Baby Sinclair of the 1990s comedy series Dinosaurs, while stating that "Spy × Family manages to strike a great balance between commentary, drama, action, and slice-of-life comedy without undermining any of those respective elements in the process." Rebecca Silverman of Anime News Network listed Spy × Family as the best anime of 2022, stated that the story crafts a delightful and emotionally meaningful tale about one family wrapped up in all of this. Silverman also hailed Anya and Bond as the best characters of 2022, due to how wonderful they are as a person and the dog in which they represent the same sign that Anya gets to keep the family she desperately wants.

=== Accolades ===
In 2022, Spy × Family won in the anime category while Anya Forger voice actress Atsumi Tanezaki won in the voice actor category of the Yahoo! Japan Search Awards, based on the number of searches for a particular term compared to the year before. Yor and Anya Forger were ranked fifth and tenth respectively, on the top 10 overall buzzwords list while the anime series was awarded the Pixiv Award at Japan's Internet Buzzword Awards. In 2023, the series received the award for Animation of the Year at the Tokyo Anime Award Festival. At the 7th Crunchyroll Anime Awards, Spy × Family was one of the three series to win the most awards with six; the series won in the categories: Best New Series, Best Comedy, Best Supporting Character and "Must Protect at All Costs" Character (Anya Forger), Best Ending Sequence ("Comedy" by Gen Hoshino), and Best VA Performance – Portuguese (Nina Carvalho as Anya Forger). It was also nominated for twelve other categories, including Anime of the Year. It won the 2023 Excellence Award at Japan's 28th annual Association of Media in Digital (AMD) Awards. In June 2023, the anime series won the Character License Award at the Japan Character Awards by Japan's Character Brand Licensing Association (CBLA).

=== Awards and nominations ===
Year	Award	Category	Recipient	Result	Ref.
2022	MTV Video Music Awards Japan	Best Group Video (Japan)	"Mixed Nuts" by Official Hige Dandism	Won	
2022	12th Newtype Anime Awards	Best Work (TV)	Spy × Family	2nd place	
2022	12th Newtype Anime Awards	Best Character (Male)	Loid Forger	3rd place	
2022	12th Newtype Anime Awards	Best Character (Female)	Anya Forger	4th place	
2022	12th Newtype Anime Awards	Best Character (Female)	Yor Forger	6th place	
2022	12th Newtype Anime Awards	Best Voice Actor	Takuya Eguchi	5th place	
2022	12th Newtype Anime Awards	Best Voice Actress	Saori Hayami	4th place	
2022	12th Newtype Anime Awards	Best Voice Actress	Atsumi Tanezaki	5th place	
2022	12th Newtype Anime Awards	Best Theme Song	"Mixed Nuts" by Official Hige Dandism	5th place	
2022	12th Newtype Anime Awards	Best Director	Kazuhiro Furuhashi	5th place	
2022	12th Newtype Anime Awards	Best Character Design	Kazuaki Shimada	2nd place	
2022	12th Newtype Anime Awards	Best Mascot Character	Anya Forger	Won	
2022	12th Newtype Anime Awards	Best Screenplay	Kazuhiro Furuhashi	3rd place	
2022	12th Newtype Anime Awards	Best Soundtrack	(K)now Name	3rd place	
2022	Yahoo! Japan Search Awards	Anime Category	Spy × Family	Won	
2022	Yahoo! Japan Search Awards	Voice Actor Category	Atsumi Tanezaki	Won	
2022	IGN Awards	Best Anime Series	Spy × Family	Nominated	
2022	28th Manga Barcelona Awards	Best Anime Series Premiere	Spy × Family	Won	
2022	Internet Buzzword Awards	Pixiv Award	Spy × Family	Won	
2022	Reiwa Anisong Awards	Best Work Award	"Mixed Nuts" by Official Hige Dandism	Nominated	
2022	Reiwa Anisong Awards	Composition Award	"Mixed Nuts" by Official Hige Dandism (Note: Satoshi Fujihara credited as nominee.)	Nominated	
2022	Reiwa Anisong Awards	Artist Song Award	"Mixed Nuts" by Official Hige Dandism	Won	
2022	AT-X	Top Anime Ranking	Spy × Family	3rd place	
2023	5th Global Demand Awards	Most In-Demand Anime Series of 2022	Spy × Family	Nominated	
2023	Tokyo Anime Award Festival	Animation of the Year (Television)	Spy × Family	Won	
2023	7th Crunchyroll Anime Awards	Anime of the Year	Spy × Family	Nominated	
2023	7th Crunchyroll Anime Awards	Best Main Character	Loid Forger	Nominated	
2023	7th Crunchyroll Anime Awards	Best Supporting Character	Yor Forger	Nominated	
2023	7th Crunchyroll Anime Awards	Best Supporting Character	Anya Forger	Won	
2023	7th Crunchyroll Anime Awards	"Must Protect at All Costs" Character	Anya Forger	Won	
2023	7th Crunchyroll Anime Awards	Best Animation	Spy × Family	Nominated	
2023	7th Crunchyroll Anime Awards	Best Director	Kazuhiro Furuhashi	Nominated	
2023	7th Crunchyroll Anime Awards	Best Action	Spy × Family	Nominated	
2023	7th Crunchyroll Anime Awards	Best Comedy	Spy × Family	Won	
2023	7th Crunchyroll Anime Awards	Best New Series	Spy × Family	Won	
2023	7th Crunchyroll Anime Awards	Best Character Design	Kazuaki Shimada	Nominated	
2023	7th Crunchyroll Anime Awards	Best Score	(K)now Name	Nominated	
2023	7th Crunchyroll Anime Awards	Best Anime Song	"Comedy" by Gen Hoshino	Nominated	
2023	7th Crunchyroll Anime Awards	Best Opening Sequence	"Mixed Nuts" by Official Hige Dandism	Nominated	
2023	7th Crunchyroll Anime Awards	Best Ending Sequence	"Comedy" by Gen Hoshino	Won	
2023	7th Crunchyroll Anime Awards	Best VA Performance (Japanese)	Atsumi Tanezaki as Anya Forger	Nominated	
2023	7th Crunchyroll Anime Awards	Best VA Performance (English)	Natalie Van Sistine as Yor Forger	Nominated	
2023	7th Crunchyroll Anime Awards	Best VA Performance (Portuguese)	Nina Carvalho as Anya Forger	Won	
2023	7th Crunchyroll Anime Awards	Best VA Performance (Spanish)	Miguel de León as Loid Forger	Nominated	
2023	28th AMD Awards	Excellence Award	Spy × Family	Won	
2023	Japan Character Awards	Character License Award	Spy × Family	Won	
2023	37th Japan Gold Disc Awards	Song of the Year by Download (Japan)	"Mixed Nuts" by Official Hige Dandism	Won	
2023	37th Japan Gold Disc Awards	Best 3 Songs by Download	"Mixed Nuts" by Official Hige Dandism	Won	
2023	37th Japan Gold Disc Awards	Song of the Year by Streaming (Japan)	"Mixed Nuts" by Official Hige Dandism	Won	
2023	37th Japan Gold Disc Awards	Best 5 Songs by Streaming	"Mixed Nuts" by Official Hige Dandism	Won	
2023	Japan Expo Awards	Daruma for Best Anime	Spy × Family	Nominated	
2023	Japan Expo Awards	Daruma for Best Director	Spy × Family	Nominated	
2023	Japan Expo Awards	Daruma for Best Action Anime	Spy × Family	Nominated	
2023	Japan Expo Awards	Daruma for Best Suspense Anime	Spy × Family	Nominated	
2023	Japan Expo Awards	Daruma for Best Slice of Life Anime	Spy × Family	Won	
2023	Japan Expo Awards	Daruma for Best Opening	"Mixed Nuts" by Official Hige Dandism	Nominated	
2023	Japan Expo Awards	Daruma for Best Ending	"Color" by Yama	Nominated	
2023	18th AnimaniA Awards	Best TV Series: Streaming	Spy × Family	Won	
2023	45th Anime Grand Prix	Grand Prix	Spy × Family	3rd place	
2023	45th Anime Grand Prix	Best Character	Anya Forger	Won	
2023	45th Anime Grand Prix	Best Theme Song	"Mixed Nuts" by Official Hige Dandism	Won	
2023	45th Anime Grand Prix	Best Voice Actor	Atsumi Tanezaki	2nd place	
2023	45th Anime Grand Prix	Best Voice Actor	Saori Hayami	8th place	
2023	13th Newtype Anime Awards	Best Character (Male)	Loid Forger	2nd place	
2023	13th Newtype Anime Awards	Best Character (Female)	Yor Forger	8th place	
2023	13th Newtype Anime Awards	Best Theme Song	"Souvenir" by Bump of Chicken	9th place	
2023	13th Newtype Anime Awards	Best Mascot Character	Anya Forger	4th place	
2023	Reiwa Anisong Awards	Composition Award	"Kura Kura" by Ado (Note: Meiyo credited as nominee.)	Nominated	
2023	AT-X	Top Anime Ranking	Spy × Family	12th place	
2023	AT-X 25th Anniversary	Recommended Series	Spy × Family	6th place	
2024	8th Crunchyroll Anime Awards	"Must Protect at All Costs" Character	Anya Forger	Won	
2024	8th Crunchyroll Anime Awards	Best Comedy	Spy × Family	Won	
2024	8th Crunchyroll Anime Awards	Best Continuing Series	Spy × Family	Nominated	
2024	8th Crunchyroll Anime Awards	Best Ending Sequence	"Color" by Yama	Nominated	
2024	8th Crunchyroll Anime Awards	Best VA Performance (Japanese)	Atsumi Tanezaki as Anya Forger	Nominated	
2024	8th Crunchyroll Anime Awards	Best VA Performance (Arabic)	Hiba Snobar as Anya Forger	Nominated	
2024	8th Crunchyroll Anime Awards	Best VA Performance (Castilian)	Majo Montesinos Guzmán as Anya Forger	Nominated	
2024	46th Anime Grand Prix	Best Character	Anya Forger	9th place	
2024	46th Anime Grand Prix	Best Voice Actor	Atsumi Tanezaki	Won	
2024	Japan Expo Awards	Daruma for Best Ending	"Todome no Ichigeki" by Vaundy feat. Cory Wong	Nominated	
2024	19th AnimaniA Awards	Best TV Series: Disc Release	Spy × Family	Won	
2024	19th AnimaniA Awards	Best Director	Kazuhiro Furuhashi	Won	
2024	19th AnimaniA Awards	Best Character Design	Kazuaki Shimada	Won	
2024	19th AnimaniA Awards	Best Studio	Wit Studio and CloverWorks	Won	
2024	19th AnimaniA Awards	Best German Voice Acting	Tim Knauer as Loid Forger	Won	
2024	19th AnimaniA Awards	Best German Voice Acting	Lana Finn Marti as Anya Forger	Nominated	
2024	19th AnimaniA Awards	Best Anime Score	(K)now Name	Won	
2024	19th AnimaniA Awards	Best Anime Song	"Mixed Nuts" by Official Hige Dandism	Nominated	
2024	IGN Awards	Best Anime Series	Spy × Family Season 2	Nominated	
2025	9th Crunchyroll Anime Awards	"Must Protect at All Costs" Character	Anya Forger	Won	
2025	9th Crunchyroll Anime Awards	Best Comedy	Spy × Family Season 2	Nominated	
2025	9th Crunchyroll Anime Awards	Best Continuing Series	Spy × Family Season 2	Nominated	
2025	9th Crunchyroll Anime Awards	Best VA Performance (Arabic)	Basil Al-Rifai as Loid Forger	Nominated	
2025	9th Crunchyroll Anime Awards	Best VA Performance (Arabic)	Hiba Snobar as Anya Forger	Won	
2026	Reiwa Anisong Awards	Artist Song Award	"Hi o Mamoru" by Spitz	Nominated	
2026	10th Crunchyroll Anime Awards	"Must Protect at All Costs" Character	Anya Forger	Won	
2026	10th Crunchyroll Anime Awards	Best Comedy	Spy × Family Season 3	Nominated	
2026	10th Crunchyroll Anime Awards	Best Slice of Life	Spy × Family Season 3	Won	
2026	10th Crunchyroll Anime Awards	Best Continuing Series	Spy × Family Season 3	Nominated	
2026	10th Crunchyroll Anime Awards	Best Ending Sequence	"Actor" by Lilas Ikuta	Nominated	
2026	10th Crunchyroll Anime Awards	Best VA Performance (Arabic)	Hamoud Abu Hassoun as Loid Forger (Childhood)	Nominated	
2026	10th Crunchyroll Anime Awards	Best VA Performance (Arabic)	Raafat Bazo as Yuri Briar	Nominated	
2026	10th Crunchyroll Anime Awards	Best VA Performance (Arabic)	Ghada Omar as Yor Forger	Nominated	
2026	10th Crunchyroll Anime Awards	Best VA Performance (Hindi)	Merlyn James as Anya Forger	Nominated	
2026	Japan Expo Awards	Daruma for Best Ending	"Actor" by Lilas Ikuta	Nominated	
2026	48th Anime Grand Prix	Best Character	Anya Forger	6th place	
2026	48th Anime Grand Prix	Best Voice Actor	Saori Hayami	Won	
2026	48th Anime Grand Prix	Best Voice Actor	Atsumi Tanezaki	4th place	
2026	21st AnimaniA Awards	Best TV Sequel Series: Online	Spy × Family Season 3	Nominated	
