= Spy × Family season 2 =

Second season of Spy × Family

Spy × Family
- Season 2
- Japanese cover art for the first home media volume of the season, featuring Becky Blackbell, Damian Desmond, and Anya Forger
- No. of episodes: 12

Release
- Original network: TV Tokyo
- Original release: October 7 – December 23, 2023

Season chronology
- ← Previous; Season 1 Next → Season 3

The second season of the Spy × Family anime television series was produced by Wit Studio and CloverWorks. It was first announced alongside an animated theatrical film in December 2022, at Jump Festa. Ichirō Ōkouchi replaces Kazuhiro Furuhashi as series scriptwriter, with the remaining staff and cast reprising their roles. The series continues to follow master spy Twilight, under the alias of the psychiatrist Loid Forger, and his pretend family, consisting of his daughter Anya, a telepath, his wife Yor, an assassin known as the Thorn Princess, and the family dog Bond with precognitive power.

The second season of the anime series consists of 12 episodes. The titles of its episodes are written as "Mission" with a number (e.g. "Mission 1", "Mission 2", etc.) which the counting continues across seasons; the first episode of this season is "Mission 26". This naming convention follows the original manga's practice, which also uses "Mission" for chapter titles. This season adapts 21 main chapters of the manga, from Mission 39 to Mission 59, along with a couple of side stories: Extra Mission 2 and Short Mission 6 to 7.

The season aired from October 7 to December 23, 2023. The opening theme is directed by Masaaki Yuasa and uses the song "Kura Kura" (クラクラ; lit. 'Dizzy') performed by Ado. The ending theme is directed by Eugene Winter and uses the song "Todome no Ichigeki" (トドメの一撃; lit. 'Finishing Strike') performed by Vaundy (feat. Cory Wong).

The season is licensed for streaming by Crunchyroll outside of Asia, while it is distributed by Muse Communication in a selection of countries in South and Southeast Asia. (Note: The countries mentioned are Bangladesh, Bhutan, Brunei, Cambodia, India, Indonesia, Laos, Malaysia, Myanmar (Burma), Nepal, Philippines, Singapore, Thailand, Vietnam, and Pakistan)

== Episodes ==
No. overall	No. in season	Title	Directed by (Note: Production staff information is taken from the ending credits of each episode)	Written by	Storyboarded by	Original release date	Viewership rating
26	1	"Follow Mama and Papa"; Transliteration: "Chichi to Haha o Bikō Seyo" (Japanese: ちちとははをびこうせよ)	Kazuhiro Furuhashi & Teruyuki Omine	Ayumu Hisao	Kazuhiro Furuhashi	October 7, 2023	3.0%
While terminating the extremist group Red Circus, Yor is shot and wounded in her rear side. The next day, Loid takes her on a date, believing her pained mood is his fault, while Anya and Franky tail them. Yor's constant pain prevents her from enjoying the date, foiling Loid's plans. At a restaurant, a waiter, a survivor of the Red Circus, recognizes Yor and seeks revenge by poisoning her with blowfish venom, to no avail. Anya thwarts his second assassination attempt, forcing him to concede. The toxin helps numb Yor's pain, letting her enjoy the date. The morning after, the toxin's effects wear off, and Yor is back to her foul mood, confusing Loid again.
27	2	"Bond's Strategy to Stay Alive"; Transliteration: "Bondo no Seizon Senryaku" (Japanese: ボンドの生存戦略)	Miyuki Kuroki	Daishirō Tanimura	Miyuki Kuroki	October 14, 2023	3.0%
27	2	"Damian's Field Research Trip"; Transliteration: "Damian no Yagai Gakushū" (Japanese: ダミアンの野外学習)	Miyuki Kuroki	Ichirō Ōkouchi	Miyuki Kuroki	October 14, 2023	3.0%
"Bond's Strategy to Stay Alive": Bond has a vision where he dies after eating food made by Yor. To prevent that, Bond searches for Loid so that he can come home early and cook dinner instead. Bond eventually finds Loid and helps him steal an experimental truth serum for his mission. "Damian's Field Research Trip": Worried that Damian is studying too hard to achieve a Stella during the holiday break, Emile and Ewen stay behind with Damian after the former got punished for tardiness. Henderson later has the custodian, Mr. Green, bring the boys on a field trip to a nearby lake to teach Damian and the boys a lesson that relaxing and having fun are just as important as studying.
28	3	"Mission and Family"; Transliteration: "Ninmu to Kazoku" (Japanese: 任務と家族)	Hayato Sakai	Ichirō Ōkouchi & Ayumu Hisao	Hayato Sakai	October 21, 2023	N/A
28	3	"The Elegant Bondman"; Transliteration: "Kareinaru Bondoman" (Japanese: 華麗なるボンドマン)	Hayato Sakai	Ichirō Ōkouchi & Ayumu Hisao	Hayato Sakai	October 21, 2023	N/A
28	3	"The Heart of a Child / Waking Up"; Transliteration: "Kodomo Kokoro / Mezamashi" (Japanese: 子ども心 / 目覚まし)	Hayato Sakai	Ichirō Ōkouchi & Ayumu Hisao	Hayato Sakai	October 21, 2023	N/A
"Mission and Family": When the SSS suspect a former reporter named Franklin Perkin is sending anti-Ostania articles to Westalis, Yuri is assigned to observe him and gather evidence. Eventually, after collecting sufficient proof that Franklin has been secretly taking photos of his writing works with falsified narratives and sending them via his post office job, Yuri arrests Franklin, but not before assuring him that his father's well-being will be taken care of. "The Elegant Bondman": Anya watches an episode of Spy Wars where the main character, Bondman, gathers a harem of beautiful women, only for his harem to beat him violently after Bondman refuses to choose only one of them to be his girlfriend. "The Heart of a Child / Waking Up": Loid has a hard time understanding Anya after he and Yor take her out for fun. / In the morning, Damian wakes up early to study before school, while Anya sleeps in and is thus late.
29	4	"The Pastry of Knowledge"; Transliteration: "Chie no Kanmi" (Japanese: 知恵の甘味)	Yoshitsugu Hosokawa	Daishirō Tanimura	Makoto Fuchigami	October 28, 2023	2.6%
29	4	"The Informant's Great Romance Plan II"; Transliteration: "Jōhō-ya no Ren'ai Dai Sakusen II" (Japanese: 情報屋の恋愛大作戦II)	Yoshitsugu Hosokawa	Ayumu Hisao	Makoto Fuchigami	October 28, 2023	2.6%
"The Pastry of Knowledge": Anya, Becky, Damian, Emile, and Ewen play Old Maid games to decide which of them to eat the four special macarons that are rumored to make those who eat them become smarter. Down to the last two players, Damian lets Anya win after seeing her crying. Despite eating the macaron, Anya's grades barely improve, yet Loid notices her talent in Ancient Language. "The Informant's Great Romance Plan II": After failing to get Loid's help, Franky set out by himself to find a lost cat that belongs to a barista he has a crush on. Nevertheless, Yor offers her help and manages to capture the cat. Franky returns the cat to his owner, only to be heartbroken after learning that his crush already has a boyfriend. After her lunch break, Yor receives a phone call from the Shopkeeper about a new mission.: Note: Hiroyuki Tanaka is an assistant director for this episode.
30	5	"Plan to Cross the Border"; Transliteration: "Ekkyō Sakusen" (Japanese: 越境作戦)	Haruka Tsuzuki	Daishirō Tanimura	Haruka Tsuzuki	November 4, 2023	N/A
The Shopkeeper, the leader of Garden, assigns Yor to be the bodyguard of Olka Gretcher and her son, the sole survivors of a deposed crime family, until they can safely escape to a neutral country after boarding the cruise ship Princess Lorelei. Coincidentally, Anya and Loid also win a trip on the same cruise via a shopping mall raffle. Under the guise of City Hall's business, Yor and her manager, Matthew McMahon, who is also her Garden colleague, board the cruise to meet with Olka, her son, and her fake husband. When Matthew is away, Yor escorts Olka and her son outside to have some fresh air. However, their conversation is wiretapped by an informant with extraordinary hearing, allowing the pursuing assassins on the ship to learn about Olka's alias.
31	6	"The Fearsome Luxury Cruise Ship"; Transliteration: "Senritsu no Gōka Kyakusen" (Japanese: 戦慄の豪華客船)	Tsuyoshi Tobita	Daishirō Tanimura	Shinji Itadaki	November 11, 2023	N/A
After dinner, Matthew realizes the mission has been compromised after dispatching two assassins who were sent after them by the informant, and orders Yor to escort their targets to another safe room. Realizing that they are dealing with Garden, the assassins join forces to share information and the bounty. Yor quietly stops any attempts on the Gretchers ascending the ship and is about to be approached by another assassin named Barnaby. At the same time, at a souvenir shop nearby, Anya overhears the assassin's plan to murder them in the middle of the crowd, and distracts Loid by making him try on holiday clothes. Dodging an attack from Barnaby at the last second, Yor prepares to face off against him.
32	7	"Who Is This Mission For?"; Transliteration: "Dare ga Tame no Ninmu" (Japanese: 誰がための任務)	Shōgo Ono	Daishirō Tanimura	Mamoru Kurosawa	November 18, 2023	2.8%
While Yor fights Barnaby, Anya fools the nearby crowd into thinking the fight is a circus act, allowing Yor to defeat Barnaby. Yor's group reconvenes safely at the safe room. After reprimanding Yor for her carelessness and inattentiveness, Matthew leaves Yor to stand guard for the Gretchers, during which she reflects on her feelings about the mission and her family. The next day, Anya tries to distract Loid with the cruise's entertainment so she can find and help Yor, only to get distracted herself. As night falls and people, including Loid and Anya, gather on the main deck to watch the fireworks, Yor escorts the Gretchers to the rendezvous point as the assassins close in.
33	8	"The Symphony Upon the Ship"; Transliteration: "Senjō no Shinfonī" (Japanese: 船上の交響曲(シンフォニー))	Isao Hayashi	Daishirō Tanimura	Isao Hayashi & Yoshiki Kitai	November 25, 2023	2.4%
33	8	"Sis's Herb Tea"; Transliteration: "Ane no Hābutī" (Japanese: 姉のハーブティー)	Isao Hayashi	Daishirō Tanimura	Isao Hayashi & Yoshiki Kitai	November 25, 2023	2.4%
"The Symphony Upon the Ship": Yor tries to take the Gretchers to the rendezvous point via the top deck during the fireworks show, but is ambushed by the assassins there. With Matthew's help, Yor slaughters them until she encounters a powerful shirasaya-wielding assassin who knocks out Matthew. Being cornered, Yor recalls her memories of Yuri, the Forgers, and the Gretchers, helping her realize her reason to fight for her loved ones and giving her the resolve to strike back. "Sis's Herb Tea": Yuri catches a cold while on a mission. While resting at home, he reminisces about his childhood days when Yor took care of him when he was sick.
34	9	"The Hand That Connects to the Future"; Transliteration: "Mirai o Tsunagu Te" (Japanese: 未来を繋ぐ手)	Takahiro Harada & Ryōta Karasawa	Daishirō Tanimura	Isao Hayashi & Miyuki Kuroki	December 2, 2023	N/A
After the fireworks, Loid learns that there are bombs placed all over the ship, which the assassin informant planted with the intent to kill everyone onboard. While a disguised Loid is disarming the bombs, Anya goes to help Yor by secretly throwing Yor's stiletto back, allowing her to defeat the swordsman. As the assassin leader escapes and confronts the informant on his escape boat, Loid discovers a bomb about to explode and throws it overboard, inadvertently blasting the two assassins and capsizing their boat. After an emotional farewell to the Gretchers as they safely left on an escape boat, Matthew tells Yor to enjoy her vacation with her family as a reward for completing their mission.
35	10	"Enjoy the Resort to the Fullest"; Transliteration: "Rizōto o Mankitsu Seyo" (Japanese: リゾートを満喫せよ)	Hayato Sakai	Rino Yamazaki	Hayato Sakai	December 9, 2023	2.3%
35	10	"Bragging About Vacation"; Transliteration: "Kyūka Jiman" (Japanese: 休暇自慢)	Hayato Sakai	Rino Yamazaki	Hayato Sakai	December 9, 2023	2.3%
"Enjoy the Resort to the Fullest": The Forgers reunite as the Princess Lorelei arrives at a resort island where they enjoy various outdoor activities together. When the evening comes, Loid carries an exhausted Yor and Anya back on the ship, and commends Yor on her hard work. After returning to their home in Berlint, Loid discusses the vacation incidents with Sylvia. "Bragging About Vacation": Returning to school after the school break, Anya tries to brag to her friends about the cruise, but it is soon shadowed by Becky's grander party and made fun of by her classmates because of its absurdity. She goes home downhearted and relays the story, only for Loid, Yuri, and Yor to hypocritically tell her that lying is wrong.
36	11	"Berlint in Love"; Transliteration: "Bārinto Rabu" (Japanese: バーリント・ラブ)	Yōsuke Yamamoto	Honoka Katō	Koji Masunari & Takahiro Harada	December 16, 2023	N/A
36	11	"Nightfall's Daily Life"; Transliteration: "<Tobari> no Nichijō" (Japanese: 〈夜帷(とばり)〉の日常)	Yōsuke Yamamoto	Honoka Katō	Koji Masunari & Takahiro Harada	December 16, 2023	N/A
"Berlint in Love": Inspired by her favorite TV drama Berlint in Love, Becky heads to the Forgers' home unannounced with the intention of wooing Loid so that she can marry him. However, her attempts at flirting confuse Loid and make Yor rush her to the hospital, thinking she is drunk. Witnessing Yor's strength, Becky concedes and asks Yor to teach her to be stronger so she can be more appealing to Loid. "Nightfall's Daily Life": While Loid was vacationing with his family on the Princess Lorelei, Fiona volunteered to take Loid's missions and later went to the mountains to train to prove her worth to Loid. After meeting Loid again and receiving his souvenir gift, Fiona secretly becomes giddy with love-sick happiness while still appearing aloof to him.
37	12	"Part of the Family"; Transliteration: "Kazoku no Ichiin" (Japanese: 家族の一員)	Yukiko Imai	Ayumu Isao	Yukiko Imai	December 23, 2023	N/A
While taking Bond out for a walk, Loid tries to train him without much success, because it reminds the latter of the time he was mistreated as an experiment. After getting a future vision of a burning apartment, Bond leads Loid into the fire to rescue a puppy trapped inside and apprehend the arsonist lurking outside. Loid softly chides Bond for his recklessness but reassures Bond of his place as a Forger family member. They return home, where Anya rewards them with her origami Stella stars for their accomplishments.

== Home media release ==
=== Japanese ===
Toho Animation (Japan – Region 2/A)
Volume	Episodes	Cover character	Release date	Ref.
1	Mission 26–29	Anya Forger, Damian Desmond and Becky Blackbell	December 20, 2023	
2	Mission 30–33	Yor Forger, Loid Forger, Anya Forger and Bond Forger	February 21, 2024	
3	Mission 34–37	Loid Forger, Anya Forger, Yor Forger, Yuri Briar and Fiona Frost	April 17, 2024	

=== English ===
Crunchyroll, LLC (North America – Region 1/A)
Volume	Episodes	Cover character	Release date	Ref.
Season 2	Mission 26–37	Loid Forger, Anya Forger, Yor Forger and Bond Forger (primary / alternate cover)	March 18, 2025	
