= Music of Spy × Family =

Anime series discography

This article lists the soundtrack albums attributed to the anime series Spy × Family, featuring music composed and recorded by the Japanese music group (K)now Name.

== Spy × Family Original Soundtrack Vol. 1 ==
Spy × Family Original Soundtrack Vol. 1

Soundtrack album by (K)now Name
- Released: June 26, 2022
- Studios: Sound City; Landmark Studio
- Genres: Anime soundtrack; J-pop; jazz
- Length: 89:23
- Language: English
- Label: Toho Animation
- Producers: Yoshiki Kobayashi; Masaya Saito; Mirei Tsumura

(K)now Name chronology
Spy × Family Original Soundtrack Vol. 1 (2022)	Spy × Family Original Soundtrack (2022)

Singles from Spy × Family Original Soundtrack Vol. 1
- 1. "TBD" Released: May 8, 2022

TV Animation Spy × Family Original Soundtrack Vol. 1 (TVアニメ『SPY×FAMILY』オリジナル・サウンドトラック Vol.1, TV Anime "SPY×FAMILY" Orijinaru・Saundotorakku Vol.1) was released by Toho Animation Records exclusively on digital platforms on June 26, 2022. The album features the jazz-influenced musical score for the series' first season, plus the single "TBD".

=== Track listing ===
All music is composed by (K)now Name (Makoto Miyazaki and Shuhei Mutsuki), except where indicated.

No.	Title	Lyrics	Music	Vocals	Length
1.	"Strix"				2:25
2.	"WISE"				1:41
3.	"Transient Calm"				1:40
4.	"Liar"				1:41
5.	"Disguise"				1:40
6.	"Plan B"				1:55
7.	"Crisis of My Home"				1:45
8.	"Girl's Pastime"				1:41
9.	"Subject 007"				1:44
10.	"Front Line"				1:41
11.	"Elusive Man"				1:42
12.	"Without Tears"				3:58
13.	"Ponder"				1:43
14.	"Thorn Princess"				2:08
15.	"Delusion"				2:06
16.	"Verge of a Setback"				1:52
17.	"Strange Marriage"				3:38
18.	"Housework"				1:42
19.	"Berlint"				1:37
20.	"Gorgeous Step"				1:57
21.	"Try Again"				1:51
22.	"Looks Like a Nice Family"				1:45
23.	"Teacups"				2:10
24.	"Little by Little"				1:47
25.	"Sunset"				1:56
26.	"Very Elegant"				2:15
27.	"Eden College"				2:54
28.	"Cecile Hall"				2:15
29.	"Housemaster"				2:10
30.	"Precocious"				2:21
31.	"Second Son"				1:56
32.	"Twilight"				2:03
33.	"State Security Service"				1:47
34.	"Questioning"				1:55
35.	"Crack Down"				1:44
36.	"Commence"				0:43
37.	"Next Mission"				0:17
38.	"No One Knows"				1:39
39.	"Forever and Ever"				2:04
40.	"As a Mother. As a Wife."				1:50
41.	"Small Daily Life"				1:54
42.	"Snake in the Grass"				2:17
43.	"The Forgers"				2:13
44.	"Bondman"				1:41
45.	"TBD"	AIJ	Miyazaki	Ayaka Tachibana	3:56
Total length:					74:57

== Spy × Family Original Soundtrack ==
Spy × Family Original Soundtrack

Soundtrack album by (K)now Name
- Released: December 21, 2022
- Studios: Sound City; Landmark Studio
- Genres: Anime soundtrack; J-pop; jazz
- Length: 129:52
- Languages: English; Japanese
- Label: Toho Animation
- Producers: Yoshiki Kobayashi; Masaya Saito; Mirei Tsumura

(K)now Name chronology
Spy × Family Original Soundtrack Vol. 1 (2022)	Spy × Family Original Soundtrack (2022)	Spy × Family Season 2 Original Soundtrack (2023)

Singles from Spy × Family Original Soundtrack
- 1. "Good Day" Released: October 8, 2022; 2. "Breeze" Released: November 13, 2022

TV Animation Spy × Family Original Soundtrack (TVアニメ『SPY×FAMILY』オリジナル･サウンドトラック, TV Anime "SPY×FAMILY" Orijinaru・Saundotorakku) is an expanded version of the Vol. 1 soundtrack, released by Toho Animation Records on CD and digital platforms on December 21, 2022. The two-disc album adds more background music tracks and the singles "Good Day" and "Breeze".

=== Track listing ===
All music is composed by (K)now Name (Makoto Miyazaki and Shuhei Mutsuki), except where indicated.

Disc 1
No.	Title	Lyrics	Music	Vocals	Length
1.	"Strix"				2:25
2.	"WISE"				1:41
3.	"Transient Calm"				1:40
4.	"Liar"				1:41
5.	"Disguise"				1:40
6.	"Plan B"				1:55
7.	"Crisis of My Home"				1:45
8.	"Girl's Pastime"				1:41
9.	"Subject 007"				1:44
10.	"Front Line"				1:41
11.	"Elusive Man"				1:42
12.	"Without Tears"				3:58
13.	"Ponder"				1:43
14.	"Thorn Princess"				2:08
15.	"Delusion"				2:06
16.	"Verge of a Setback"				1:52
17.	"Strange Marriage"				3:38
18.	"Housework"				1:42
19.	"Berlint"				1:37
20.	"Gorgeous Step"				1:57
21.	"Try Again"				1:51
22.	"Looks Like a Nice Family"				1:45
23.	"Teacups"				2:10
24.	"Little by Little"				1:47
25.	"Sunset"				1:56
26.	"Very Elegant"				2:15
27.	"Eden College"				2:54
28.	"Cecile Hall"				2:15
29.	"Housemaster"				2:10
30.	"Precocious"				2:21
31.	"Second Son"				1:56
32.	"Twilight"				2:03
33.	"State Security Service"				1:47
34.	"Questioning"				1:55
35.	"Crack Down"				1:44
36.	"TBD"	AIJ	Miyazaki	Ayaka Tachibana	3:56
Total length:					74:57

Disc 2
No.	Title	Lyrics	Music	Vocals	Length
1.	"Bondman"				1:41
2.	"Commence"				0:43
3.	"Next Mission"				0:17
4.	"See You Next Week"				0:13
5.	"No One Knows"				1:39
6.	"Forever and Ever"				2:04
7.	"As a Mother. As a Wife."				1:50
8.	"Small Daily Life"				1:54
9.	"Snake in the Grass"				2:17
10.	"The Forgers"				2:13
11.	"Mother's Cooking"				1:14
12.	"Shoot-out"				1:50
13.	"Final Points"				1:36
14.	"Calling On"				0:17
15.	"Handler"				2:32
16.	"Guard Dog"				1:59
17.	"Gain Wider Knowledge"				1:39
18.	"Bar"				2:33
19.	"Komoriuta" (子守唄; "Lullaby")	Tatsuya Endo	Miyazaki	Yor Forger（CV：Saori Hayami）	2:41
20.	"Sheep"				1:59
21.	"Stella Stars"				2:01
22.	"Stroll"				1:44
23.	"Good Day" (instrumental)		Miyazaki		2:35
24.	"Woolly"				1:43
25.	"Pitapat"				1:43
26.	"Breeze"	Nikiie	Miyazaki	Nikiie	3:24
27.	"Competitor"				1:57
28.	"Jealousy"				1:31
29.	"Nightfall"				2:36
30.	"Good Day"	Nikiie	Miyazaki	Nikiie	2:33
Total length:					54:46

=== Personnel ===
- Ryota Kikuchi – piano
- Kei Sakamoto – flute, alto flute
- Takayuki Mogami – oboe
- Hidehito Naka – clarinet
- Akira Ishikawa – bassoon
- Tatsuhito Yoshikawa – trumpet
- Nobuhide Handa – trombone
- Yoshinari Takegami – alto saxophone, tenor saxophone
- Hitoshi Konno Strings – strings
- Hitoshi Watanabe – wood bass
- Yasuo Sano – drums
- Sassy – drums

== Spy × Family Season 2 Original Soundtrack ==
Spy × Family Season 2 Original Soundtrack

Soundtrack album by (K)now Name
- Released: December 20, 2023
- Studios: Sound City; Landmark Studio
- Genres: Anime soundtrack; J-pop; jazz
- Length: 86:29
- Language: English
- Label: Toho Animation
- Producers: Yoshiki Kobayashi; Masaya Saito; Mirei Tsumura

(K)now Name chronology
Spy × Family Original Soundtrack (2022)	Spy × Family Season 2 Original Soundtrack (2023)	Spy × Family Code: White Original Soundtrack (2023)

Singles from Spy × Family Original Soundtrack
- 1. "Little Steps" Released: October 15, 2023; 2. "Garden" Released: November 26, 2023; 3. "Until the End" Released: December 3, 2023

TV Animation Spy × Family Season 2 Original Soundtrack (TVアニメ『SPY×FAMILY』Season 2 オリジナル・サウンドトラック, TV Anime "SPY×FAMILY" Season 2 Orijinaru・Saundotorakku) was released by Toho Animation Records on December 20, 2023. The two-disc album covers the score for the series' second season and features the singles "Little Steps", "Garden", and "Until the End".

=== Track listing ===
All music is composed by (K)now Name (Makoto Miyazaki and Shuhei Mutsuki), except where indicated.

Disc 1
No.	Title	Lyrics	Music	Vocals	Length
1.	"Strix" (Season 2)				2:12
2.	"Glum Face"				2:03
3.	"No Smoke Without Fire"				1:36
4.	"I Don't Get It."				2:00
5.	"Fun Tailing"				1:31
6.	"Dependable Girl"				1:49
7.	"It's All Over"				3:02
8.	"Little Steps"	(K)now Name; Nikiie	Mutsuki	Nikiie	4:27
9.	"Stella Lake"				2:14
10.	"Creeping Shadow"				2:10
11.	"Thoughtfully"				2:08
12.	"Monitored Target"				2:17
13.	"Make All Ladies Happy"				2:32
14.	"The Pastry of Knowledge"				1:40
15.	"Let's Play Cards!"				1:47
16.	"Angels and Demons"				2:15
17.	"Informant's Determination"				2:08
18.	"Wiretap"				2:17
19.	"Shopkeeper"				2:42
20.	"Big Hit"				1:35
Total length:					44:37

Disc 2
No.	Title	Lyrics	Music	Vocals	Length
1.	"Princess Lorelei"				2:16
2.	"Safe Travels!"				1:39
3.	"City Hall Director"				2:28
4.	"Warm Hug"				1:54
5.	"Crowd of Crows"				1:44
6.	"Barnaby"				2:22
7.	"Clean the Deck"				2:30
8.	"Garden"	(K)now Name; Nikiie	Miyazaki	Nikiie	1:58
9.	"Herb Tea"				1:43
10.	"Live Quietly"				2:45
11.	"Until the End"	(K)now Name; Nikiie	Miyazaki	Ayaka Tachibana	2:53
12.	"For Whom..."				2:18
13.	"Faithful Dog"				2:41
14.	"Graceful"				1:25
15.	"Waves Are Calm"				1:34
16.	"Love Is Blind"				3:33
17.	"Unfriendly and Rebellious"				1:47
18.	"Uneven Fruit"	(K)now Name; Nikiie	Mutsuki	Nikiie	4:05
Total length:					41:44

=== Personnel ===
- Ryota Kikuchi – piano
- Kei Sakamoto – flute, piccolo
- Saburo Tanooka – accordion
- Atsushi Ozawa – trumpet
- Nobuhide Handa – trombone
- Yoshinari Takegami – alto saxophone, tenor saxophone
- Muroya Koichiro Strings – strings
- Toshino Tanabe – bass, wood bass

== Spy × Family Code: White Original Soundtrack ==
Spy × Family Code White Original Soundtrack

Soundtrack album by (K)now Name
- Released: December 20, 2023
- Studios: Sound City; Landmark Studio
- Genres: Anime soundtrack; jazz
- Length: 60:23
- Label: Toho Animation
- Producers: Yoshiki Kobayashi; Masaya Saito; Mirei Tsumura

(K)now Name chronology
Spy × Family Season 2 Original Soundtrack (2023)	Spy × Family Code White Original Soundtrack (2023)

Spy × Family Code: White Original Soundtrack (『劇場版 SPY×FAMILY CODE: White』 オリジナル・サウンドトラック, Gekijōban "SPY×FAMILY Code: White" Orijinaru・Saundotorakku) is the soundtrack album to the 2023 film Spy × Family Code: White, released by Toho Animation Records on December 20, 2023.

=== Track listing ===
All music is composed by (K)now Name (Makoto Miyazaki).

No.	Title	Length
1.	"Masquerade"	0:56
2.	"Pseudo Family"	4:13
3.	"Surveillant on the Roof"	1:12
4.	"Three Signs"	1:40
5.	"The Beginning of the Journey"	2:37
6.	"Treasure Key"	1:46
7.	"Chocolate Thieves"	0:33
8.	"Crisis in the Train"	0:48
9.	"Instant Kill"	0:15
10.	"Frigis"	0:38
11.	"Rubble and Bonds"	1:29
12.	"Leave Request"	0:48
13.	"Hound's Nose"	1:36
14.	"Battle of Accuracy"	1:53
15.	"Quick Shopping"	0:49
16.	"City Market"	0:29
17.	"Shooting Gallery"	1:44
18.	"Wine Doping"	1:14
19.	"The Promise of That Day"	1:30
20.	"Colonel Snidel"	1:07
21.	"Find the Ingredients!"	2:10
22.	"Shall We All Go?"	1:42
23.	"Microfilm"	0:46
24.	"Domitri and Luca"	0:45
25.	"Flying Battleship"	1:24
26.	"Blizzard"	0:41
27.	"Toilet Paradise"	2:10
28.	"Hokd and Rip"	0:31
29.	"Dog Fight"	2:17
30.	"Snow Smoke"	2:03
31.	"Her Long-Awaited"	0:22
32.	"Type F"	1:54
33.	"Enormity"	2:57
34.	"Disguise Doesn't Lose"	1:03
35.	"The Last Warning"	1:29
36.	"Ditching"	2:35
37.	"Diamond Dust"	1:15
38.	"End Up"	0:22
39.	"The Family's Way Home"	1:13
40.	"Cooking Class"	0:37
41.	"Where Should We Go Next"	0:47
42.	"Code: White"	3:37
Total length:		60:23

=== Personnel ===
- Ryota Kikuchi – piano
- Kei Sakamoto – flute, piccolo, ocarina, recorder
- Kenichi Tsujimoto – trumpet
- Yoshihiko Shigei – trumpet
- Tomoki Ando – trumpet
- Hikaru Koga – trombone
- Keisuke Sumigawa – trombone
- Koichi Nonoshita – bass trombone
- Koichiro Muroya – violin
- Masami Horisawa – cello
- Muroya Koichiro Strings – strings
- Ryo Yamagata – drums
- Kaname Hamaji – horn
- Yuji Uesato – horn
- Makoto Yanagiya – horn
- Masaaki Mukai – horn
