= Natalie Van Sistine =

American voice actress

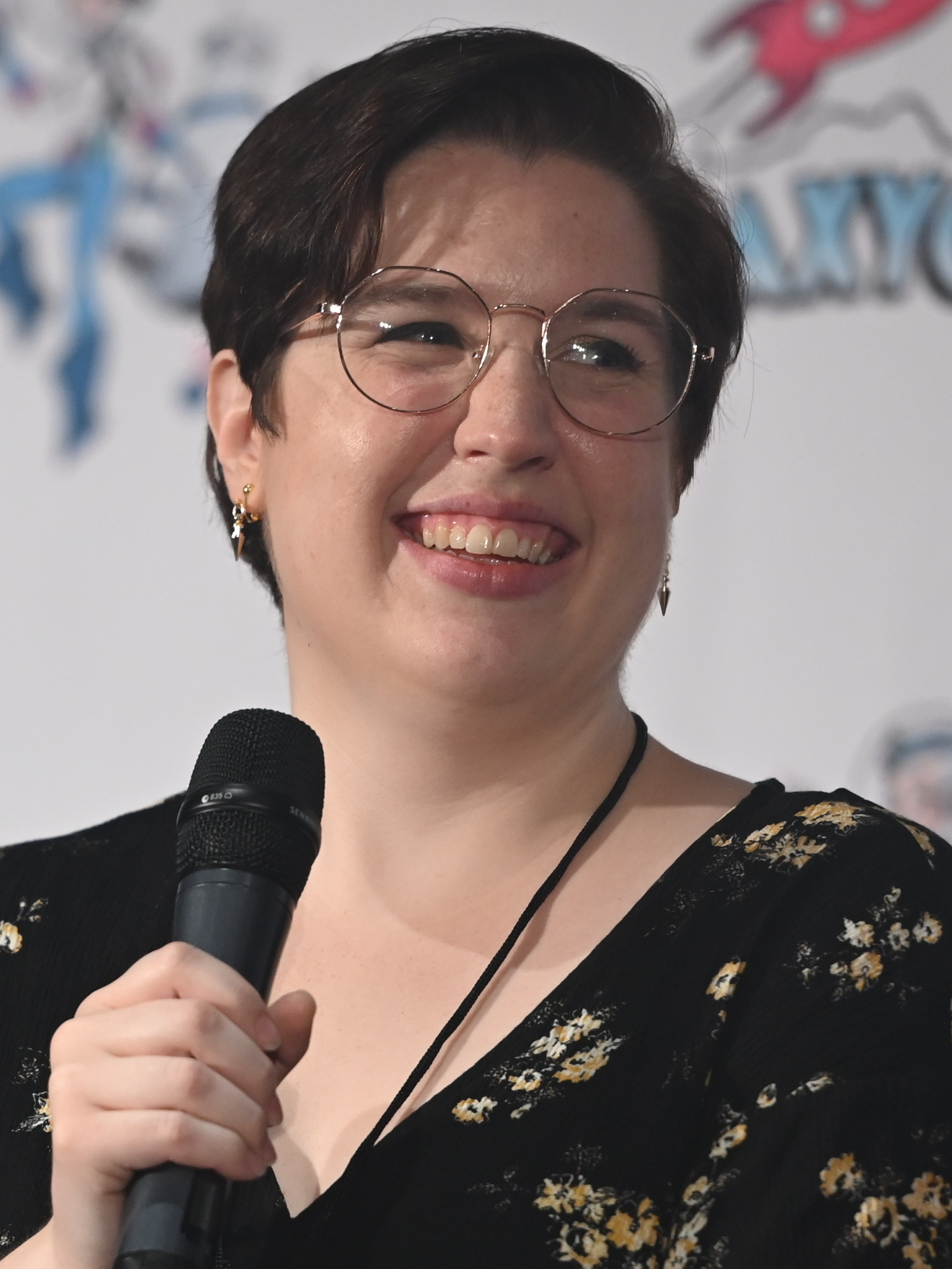
- Van Sistine in 2022
- Years active: 2016–present
- Notable credits: Reona Kisaragi in Full Dive; Yor Forger in Spy × Family; Yihdra in The Red Ranger Becomes an Adventurer in Another World; Miorine in Mobile Suit Gundam: The Witch from Mercury
- Website: www.nvansistine.com

Natalie Van Sistine is an American voice actor, audio engineer and script adaptor, known for her voicework on video games and English dubs of anime.

== Biography and career ==
After initially pursuing a career as a musician, Van Sistine began fostering a hobby in voice acting by participating in indie projects online. She obtained a bachelor's degree in audio engineering and minor in writing, and moved to Texas with the intention of being an audio/recording engineer, and "moonlight" as an actor.

Van Sistine has written adapted scripts for shows like Gunbuster and Mobile Suit Gundam: The Witch from Mercury, and audio engineered for Adachi and Shimamura and Kageki Shojo!!.

At the 7th Crunchyroll Anime Awards in 2023, Van Sistine was nominated in the Best Voice Artist Performance (English) category for her role as Yor Forger in Spy × Family.

== Filmography ==
=== Animated series ===
List of voice performances in animated series
Year	Title	Role	Notes	Ref.
2016	Rio: Rainbow Gate!	Rosa		
2019	Kemono Friends	Silver Fox		
2020	Higurashi: When They Cry - Gou	Nurse		
2021	Attack on Titan: Final Season	Lisa Braus		
2021	Suppose a Kid From the Last Dungeon Boonies Moved to a Starter Town	Sofra		
2021	Full Dive	Reona Kisaragi		
2021	Black Rock Shooter	Saya		
2021	Moriarty the Patriot	Irene Adler/James Bonde		
2021	The Vampire Dies in No Time	Gorgona		
2021	Mieruko-chan	Satoru (young)		
2021	Deep Insanity: The Lost Child	Solvy		
2022	Sasaki and Miyano	Hanzawa's mother		
2022	Spy × Family	Yor Forger		
2022	Classroom of the Elite	Suzune Horikita, Fuka Kiryuin		
2022	Blue Reflection Ray	Miyako's mother		
2022	Love Live! Superstar!!	Ren		
2022	Fire in His Fingertips	Akane		
2022	Overlord	Scama Elbero	Season 4	
2022	The Maid I Hired Recently Is Mysterious	Lilith		
2022	Chainsaw Man	Fox Devil		
2022	PuraOre! Pride of Orange	Runa Hirano, Naomi's mother		
2023	The Iceblade Sorcerer Shall Rule the World	Abbie Garnett	Season 1-2	
2023	Vinland Saga Season 2	Arnheid	Crunchyroll dub	
2023	The Ancient Magus' Bride	Alexandra Heath	Season 2	
2023	A Galaxy Next Door	Miyako Goshiki		
2023	Re: Cutie Honey	Natsuko Aki		
2023	Mobile Suit Gundam: The Witch from Mercury	Miorine		
2023	A Galaxy Next Door	Miyako		
2023	I'm in Love with the Villainess	Melia Francois		
2024	Tsukimichi: Moonlit Fantasy	Aqua		
2024	My Hero Academia Season 7	Star and Stripe		
2024	The Unwanted Undead Adventurer	Mysterious Woman		
2024	Fairy Tail: 100 Years Quest	Selene		
2024	Makeine: Too Many Losing Heroines!	Asami Gondo		
2025	The Red Ranger Becomes an Adventurer in Another World	Yihdra Arvoln		
2025	Tojima Wants to Be a Kamen Rider	Thunder Raiko		
2025	Gnosia	Gina		
2026	Sentenced to Be a Hero	Frenci Mastibolt		
2026	Witch Hat Atelier	Luluci		

=== Films ===
List of voice performances in film
Year	Title	Role	Notes	Ref.
2024	Spy × Family Code: White	Yor Forger		
2024	Mononoke the Movie: Phantom in the Rain	Botan Otomo		
2025	Chainsaw Man – The Movie: Reze Arc	Fox Devil		
2026	That Time I Got Reincarnated as a Slime the Movie: Tears of the Azure Sea	Mio		

=== Video games ===
List of voice performances in video games
Year	Title	Role	Notes	Ref.
2016	Mobile Legends: Bang Bang	Lesley		
2017	Fire Emblem Heroes	Candace		
2021	Cris Tales	Mother Superior		
2022	Goddess of Victory: Nikke	Harran, Soldier FA		
2023	Honkai: Star Rail	Serval Landau		
2025	Death Stranding 2: On the Beach	Bianca North		
2026	Neverness to Everness	Daffodill		
2026	Zenless Zone Zero	Promeia		
2026	Genshin Impact	Danica		
2026	Trails in the Sky 2nd Chapter	Luciola		
