= Anya Forger =

Fictional character from Spy × Family

- Spy × Family character
- Anya Forger by Tatsuya Endo
- First appearance: Spy × Family chapter 1: "Mission 1" (March 25, 2019)
- Created by: Tatsuya Endo
- Voiced by: Atsumi Tanezaki (Japanese); Megan Shipman, Bryn Apprill (English)

In-universe information
- Family: Loid Forger (adoptive father); Yor Forger (adoptive mother)

Anya Forger (Japanese: アーニャ・フォージャー, Hepburn: Ānya Fōjā) is a character from Tatsuya Endo's manga Spy × Family. Anya is a telepath adopted by spy Loid Forger. Loid is tasked with spying on politician Donovan Desmond, leader of the National Unity Party within . However, due to Desmond being notoriously reclusive, the only way he can get close to him is to enroll a child in the same private school as Desmond's son, Damian, and pose as a fellow parent, adopting Anya in the process.

Anya was one of the earliest characters Endo created for the manga, inspired by the protagonist of Rengoku no Ashe. As a child, Endo tried giving her fun stories and a likable design for comedic storylines where she commonly interacts with other students from the academy. Anya is voiced by Atsumi Tanezaki in Japanese. For the English dub, she was voiced by Megan Shipman and Bryn Apprill.

Critical response to Anya's character has been generally positive for her childish behaviour to the point of often being called the series' best character and has become the mascot when it comes to promotion and marketing.

== Creation ==
Manga author Tatsuya Endo first came up with the idea of using a spy and a child in the same manga but eventually wrote Yor to have a mother figure. The core of the cast was three people hiding their true idenities from one another. This trait was in particular inspired by the anime series Code Geass as its main cast also have a tendecy to hide their true personas. Since the series is a comedy, Endo wanted to make a perfect character and tried making her design, particularly her hair, charming. She was originally meant to be taller but changed in storyboards. Anya's schoolmate Damian Desmond's design changed due to negative feedback from his editor, resulting in the chemistry the two children have. When Anya entered into the academy, Endo decided to write absurd stories for her.

With Tista and Blade of the Moon Princess both having a dark tone, the editor told Endo to give Spy × Family a more cheerful one. Anya was inspired by the main character of Rengoku no Ashe. Her extrasensory perception was decided early on, and Lin cited its use for comedic effect as one of the series' strengths. He conceived the series as a on theme of a "fake family", and try a different type of spy that work fiction that tends employ. He had no experience with spy families so he decided that the manga should focus instead on Loid's families and the lies each have.

=== Casting ===
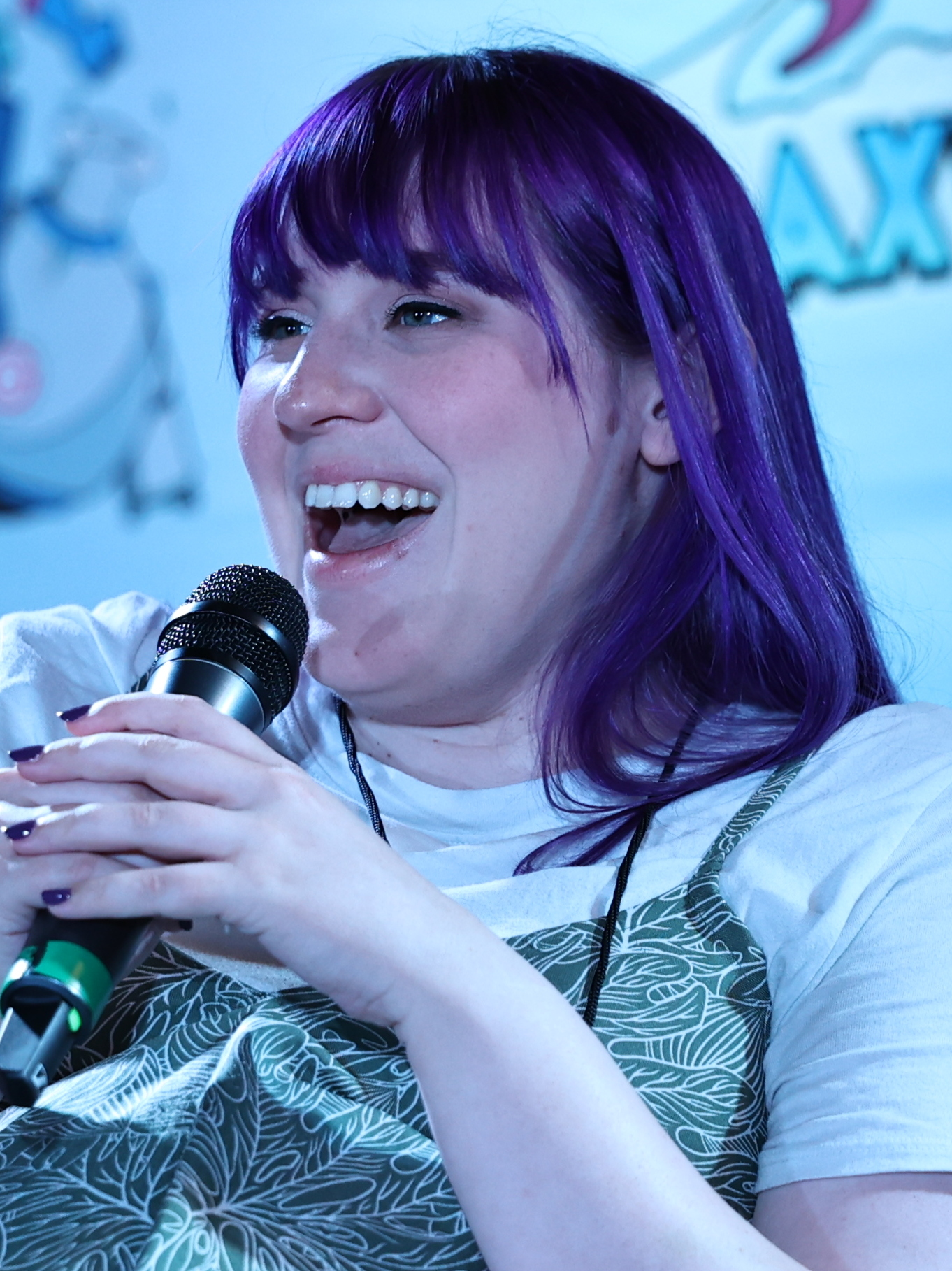
Megan Shipman voices Anya in English

For animated adaptations of the series, Anya is voiced by Atsumi Tanezaki in Japanese. Tanezaki (who had originally received a casting call to audition for Anya's mother, Yor) had personally requested to audition for Anya as well. Endo stated that, during casting, multiple people applied a "cute little girl character" for the role as Anya but he was not looking for this pitch of the character. Instead, he was looking for a voice similar to the title character from Chibi Maruko-chan. Upon hearing Tanezaki's take, the manga author was surprised by her range, praised her and submitted her to work as Anya. He felt that not only Tanezaki made a cute Anya but also comical and exaggerated to fit with the character's imagination.

For the English dub, she was first voiced by Megan Shipman and Bryn Apprill for season 2's episodes 28–29. Shipman found her as one of the best written child characters in Japan especially with how the script writers localized the lines needed for the dub. She found the character funny and at the same time surprising for her age.

She was played by Risa Masuda, Aoi Ikemuda, Miharu Izawa, Miharu Fukuchi, Rana Izutani, Mirei Tsukino, Miyo Nishiyama and Nonoka Murakata.

== Role in Spy × Family ==
Anya is an orphan young girl who can read minds, Anya was adopted by Loid Forger early into Operation Strix's plan.^{[ch. 1]} As she is a very young child, Anya is very innocent and ignorant of the world around her.^{[ch. 1–2, 17]} Thanks to her ability, Anya is the only one who knows the true identity of her family members but she keeps the information for herself, being afraid that, if her adopted parents would discover her ability, they would abandon her. Anya frequently and secretly supports her parents with their missions.^{[ch. 1–3, 9, Extra 2, 47]} Anya attends Eden Academy and tries to befriend Damian Desmond for Operation Strix but because of an altercation with Damian during orientation day, she has been shunned by the whole class but has found a friend in Becky Blackbell.^{[ch. 8–9, 17, 36]} She is unaware of Damian's feelings toward her and does not have a favorable impression of him but still tries to make friends with Damian as per her father's wishes.^{[ch. 9, 36–37, 42, 65]} Thus far, she has received 4 Stella and 3 Tonitrus, much to Loid's dismay about the latter.^{[ch. 8, 16, 61, 75, 93]}

Anya was originally an experimental human test subject dubbed "Subject 007" (被検体007, Hikentai Zero Zero Sebun; lit. "Test Subject 007"). She claimed to be six years old, although per Loid's assessment, she appears to be around age four or five. The only confirmed details of her past are her name, "Anya", and that she had been adopted by several families, only to be returned to the orphanage each time.^{[ch. 1]} Although she displays significant control in her mind-reading power, Anya cannot use it during a new moon or on numerous people's minds simultaneously.^{[ch. 3–4, 26]} Due to the trauma incurred when she was a test subject, she is not good at studying and usually refuses to do so, relying on her mind-reading ability to copy from others, although she appears to be talented in Classic Literature. (Note: Classic Literature is a fictional language in the series. It is written in Japan as "Kogo" (古語; lit. "Ancient Language"); in the anime, it is written as "Ancient Language". It is equivalent to Latin in the real world.)^{[ch. 1, 10, 26–27, 42]} She is quite flexible and quick-witted for a child her age. She also displays her bravery from time to time, such as saving a drowning child, standing up for her friends, and alerting Loid of a bomb trap, despite the danger to herself.^{[ch. 1, 16, 21, 28, 48]}

== Reception ==
=== Popularity ===
Anya's popularity led to Toho make a music video heavily featuring her. Additionally, a Tamagotchi involving Anya was released in June 2022. In a survey conducted by FinT, Spy × Family and Anya were ranked first and fourth respectively, on the top trending things among Generation Z in Japan for 2022. In the same survey, "Anya likes peanuts" (アーニャピーナッツが好き) was the no. 1 trending phrase of the year in part due to a mash-up with the song "Renai Circulation" on TikTok. In the 2021-2022 Newtype Anime Awards, Anya won Best Mascot Character award. She ranked fourth in the Best Female Character award, while Atsumi Tanezaki ranked fifth in Best Voice Actress for her performance as Anya. At the 7th Crunchyroll Anime Awards, Anya won "Best Supporting Character" and "Must Protect at All Costs" Character. Atsumi Tanezaki and Nina Carvalho were nominated in the "Best Voice Artist Performance (Japanese)" and Portuguese categories for their performances as Anya; the former lost to Eren Jaeger's Yuki Kaji while the latter won the award.

At the 45th Anime Grand Prix, Anya won Best Character while Atsumi Tanezaki ranked second in Best Voice Actor for the character's role. At the 8th Crunchyroll Anime Awards, Anya won the second "Must Protect at All Costs" Character award. Tanezaki was nominated in the Japanese voice acting category, while Hiba Snobar and Majo Montesinos Guzmán were also nominated in Arabic and Castilian Spanish categories for their character's portrayals. At the 9th edition, Anya won the same award for the third consecutive year, while Snobar won the Arabic voice acting category as Anya. At the 10th edition, Anya won the award for the fourth consecutive year, while Merlyn James was nominated in Hindi voice acting for the character's performance.

=== Critical reception ===
Antonio Mireles of The Fandom Post enjoyed the comedy of the title dysfunctional family as well as their personalities. He described the family setup of Loid as the straight man, Yor the "dumb character" and Anya the adorable child "that readers fall in love with", as the perfect recipe for a comedy. Writing for IGN, Rafael Motamayor compared Anya to Baby Sinclair of the 1990s comedy series Dinosaurs. Anime News Network wrote that the "breakout star of the show" is Anya though what made him won over the show is its heart. Anime Feminist also noted that the series' popularity is owed to the artwork, most notably Anya's multiple facial expressions and felt that the first episode was appealing thanks to the bond Loid and Anya form when the former adopts the latter, giving potential for Yor's debut.

Morgana Santilli of The Beat enjoyed the chemistry between the arranged family as he notes Anya makes the trio stand out. IGN also enjoyed Anya to the point she could be one of the best characters from 2022, labelling her as the "adorable child character that steals every scene they are in, who will inspire a ludicrous amount of merch" while also addressing how her powers are also a symbolism of how receptive children can be. IGN also praised Yor due to how strong she can be despite early signs of a clumsy woman. Rebecca Silverman of Anime News Network also hailed Anya along with Bond as the best characters of 2022, due to how wonderful they are as a person and the dog in which they represent the same sign that Anya gets to keep the family she desperately wants.
