= Loid Forger =

Fictional character from Spy × Family

- Spy × Family character
- Loid Forger by Tatsuya Endo
- First appearance: Spy × Family chapter 1: "Mission 1" (March 25, 2019)
- Created by: Tatsuya Endo
- Voiced by: Takuya Eguchi (Japanese); Alex Organ (English)

In-universe information
- Spouse: Yor Forger
- Children: Anya Forger (adopted)

Loid Forger (Japanese: ロイド・フォージャー, Hepburn: Roido Fōjā) is the protagonist from Tatsuya Endo's manga Spy × Family. A Westalian agent code-named Twilight (黄昏, Tasogare), the character is tasked with spying on politician Donovan Desmond, leader of the National Unity Party within Ostania. However, due to Desmond being notoriously reclusive, the only way Twilight can get close to him is to enroll a child in the same private school as Desmond's son, Damian, and pose as a fellow parent. To accomplish this and present the image of a happy family, he creates the alias of psychiatrist Dr. Loid Forger, adopts a young orphan girl named Anya, and marries an Ostanian city hall clerk named Yor Briar.

Loid was first created by Endo with the idea of having a spy and a child together as the main core of the story, until he came up with the idea of Yor as the mother of the house. As a result of not being too experienced with works of fiction involving spies, Endo decided the story would focus on the fake family Loid creates for his mission. In Japanese, Takuya Eguchi voices the character while Alex Organ is in charge of the English dub.

The character of Loid was praised by the media for straight head in his family, as well as the growing chemistry he has with Anya, Yor, and Bond. He's proven popular enough to appear in Nintendo Switch exclusive game, Captain Velvet Meteor: The Jump+ Dimensions. With the release of the anime's third season, multiple critics expressed shock when exploring the protagonist's backstory which they found surprisingly dark for the series.

== Creation ==
Manga author Tatsuya Endo first came up with the idea of using a spy and a child in the same manga but eventually wrote Yor to have a mother figure. He always wanted to write spies but did not found his previous ideas interesting. He envisioned Loid as both as a cool character as well as straight man. The core of the cast was three people hiding their true identities from one another. This trait was in particular inspired by the anime series Code Geass as its main cast also have a tendency to hide their true personas. Loid's characterization was made to be ikemen archetype of an individual being cool when doing most of his actions. While planning the fake identities, Loid was always meant to have fairly well-paid occupation, so Endo considered either be a doctor or a lawyer. He chose the role of psychiatrist due to how much he likes it and has studied it in the past. He considered Loid's wardrobe to be difficult to design.

Initially, Endo wanted the story to rely mostly on Loid's work as a spy but then decided to also use Anya's psychic powers for the manga. He conceived the series as a on theme of a "fake family", and try a different type of spy that work fiction that tends employ. He had no experience with spy families so he decided that the manga should focus instead on Loid's families and the lies each have. Endo originally wrote Loid as a charismatic and social person, but lacking good spy skills, causing his reputation to drop with every mission. When the manga was adapted into TV anime series, Endo was impressed by the movements the studio gave Loid and Yor.

=== Casting ===
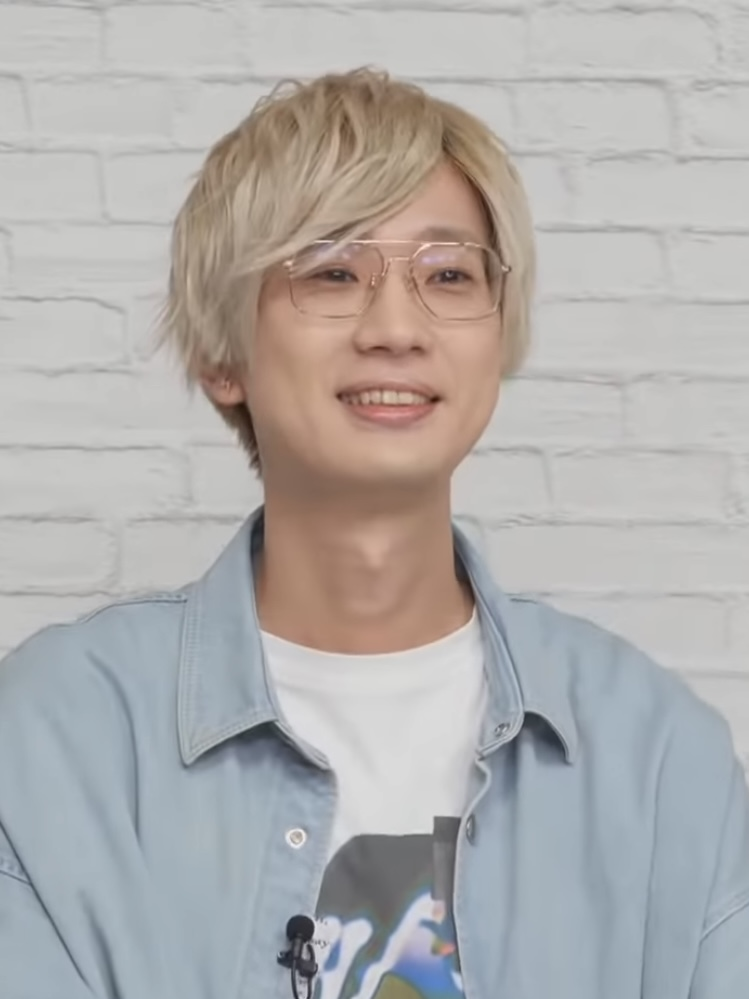
Takuya Eguchi voices Loid in Japanese

The character is voiced by Takuya Eguchi in Japanese. Endo was surprised when hearing Eguchi's deliveries as Loid and was surprised by his deliveries. Eguchi recalls that Loid is first introduced as a character who is always tense as a result of being a spy and having multiple missions. However, him becoming a family man starts slowly affecting his personality and thus grows closer to Yor and Anya. He found his deliveries being difficult as a result of his personality. As a fan of spy movies like 007 and Mission Impossible, Eguchi feels happy with having obtained the role of the spy Loid and looked forward to the first Spy × Family movie upon hearing of the plot.

Alex Organ voices Loid in the English, having obtained the role from localization director due to his experience with Psycho-Pass and Death Parade. He came to enjoy Loid's character as a result of how the spy balances several parts in the work of fiction. Since the dub was recorded after the Japanese, Organ watched the episode in Japanese first and thus use "some due diligence and read ahead a little bit with Loid" in order to fit well with his character. He also related to the Loid since both are not good at dealing with other people which allowed him to greatly connect with his role, often finding areas where the protagonist is more vulnerable.

He has been played by Win Morisaki, Hiroki Suzuki, Genki Hirakata and Kento Kinouchi, while his young persona is voiced by Eima Saitō, Kichinosuke Yonemoto, Sota Tago and Ryo Tokita.

== Role in Spy × Family ==
An unnamed spy from Westalis with extraordinary combat, memory, and information processing capabilities.^{[ch. 1–2]} As a master of disguise, he uses various faces and names for each mission, though he is generally known by his code name "Twilight".^{[vol. 1: extras]} His most recent mission, Operation Strix, requires him to enroll a child in the prestigious Eden Academy to approach a prominent figure in Ostania's warmonger political party, Donovan Desmond.^{[ch. 1]} He subsequently camouflages himself as "Loid Forger", a psychiatrist at Berlint General Hospital, to create a false family by adopting Anya and marrying Yor, although he is ignorant of their hidden identities and talents.^{[ch. 1–3]} He recently succeeded in making a brief contact with Donovan Desmond, although it yielded minimal results due to Desmond's inscrutable and enigmatic personality.^{[ch. 37–38]}

Loid possesses many talents and skills in espionage and the other roles he has to play in his missions. Although he appears manipulative and pragmatic when accomplishing his missions,^{[ch. 1–2, 12, 14, 38]} he slowly reveals his soft side to his family, and as time passes, he grows to care for them genuinely, although he outwardly does not admit it.^{[ch. 4, 10, 14, 35, 56]} As revealed later in the story, Twilight used to live with his parents in Luwen, Westalis, a town close to the Ostanian border. He lost his mother and close friends when the war started, and his father's whereabouts are unknown. He enlisted in the army and was recruited by Westalian Intelligence Agency to be trained in espionage under Sylvia Sherwood.^{[ch. 62]} At some point during his espionage career, he trained Nightfall and instilled her perfectionist and emotionless personality, which has lasted until now.^{[ch. 30]}

In the 2023 movie Spy × Family Code: White, Anya's class is holding a cooking competition, with the winner possibly earning a Stella star. Learning that the judge, the principal, loves a dessert called Meremere from the northern city of Frigis, Loid decides to take the family there to sample and recreate it, hoping to improve Operation Strix.

== Reception ==
=== Popularity ===
Loid Forger is very well-received and quite popular. In the 2022-2023 Newtype Anime Awards, Loid ranked second in the Male Character Award. At the 7th Crunchyroll Anime Awards, he was nominated for "Best Main Character". Miguel de León was nominated in the "Best Voice Artist Performance (Spanish)" category for his performance as Loid. In a survey for the "Cool Male Anime Character" conducted by WonderSpace, Loid was ranked third. In the "Tamahiyo Favorite Papa Ranking", he won first place in 2024 and 2025. Anime! Anime! did a poll regarding spy characters in 2024 and characters who are fathers in 2025, which Loid took first and second place, respectively.

In the Spy × Family popularity poll held in 2025, the character was voted in first place with his younger self being voted in ninth. At the 9th Crunchyroll Anime Awards, Basil Al-Rifai was nominated in the "Best Voice Artist Performance (Arabic)" category for his performance as Loid, but lost to Anya Forger's Hiba Snobar. At the 10th edition, Hamoud Abu Hassoun was nominated in Arabic voice acting for the character's childhood role, but lost to Tariq Obaid's Taro Sakamoto.

=== Critical reception ===
Antonio Mireles of The Fandom Post called Loid as part of a dysfunctional family put into uncanny situations that never pan out as planned due to their unique personalities with him being the straight man as the perfect recipe for a comedy. Morgana Santilli of The Beat stated that Spy × Family does an excellent job balancing fun espionage action with heartwarming family moments. The reviewers of Anime News Network Caitlin Moor praised Loid and Anya's dynamic that gives a "consistent sense of comic timing". Kambole Campbell of Polygon noting about Loid's parenthood to Anya, as well as its mix with entertaining fights.

In a further analysis, Den of Geek finds the Forgers' secrets as another reason for the series' popularity while also highlighting how despite Loid being a competent spy, his mission of becoming a good father is also hilarious. Anime Feminist felt that the first episode was appealing thanks to the bond Loid and Anya form when the former adopts the latter, giving potential for Yor's debut. In "Forging a Family: Subverting the Heteronormative Family Structure and Navigating Identities in the Anime Spy X Family", S. Mukhererjee claims family Loid creates "subverts the heteronormative family structure that is based on blood kinship and creates space for alternative family dynamic". The family creates several dynamics when the cast interact with other characters, resulting in appealing situations. In Otaku Bunka, Loid is found as an entertaining family man for every action will do for the sake of his wife and daughter, making their stories not only funny but charming. Though Yor's and Loid's marriage is arranged for their convenience, ComicBook.com noted a major change in the narrative in 2025 when Yor realizes she has developed romantic feelings for her husband, making a major step forward to how the series was handling the cast since 2019 in the debut chapter, contrasting her new love contrast her dark profession she keeps in secret. The evolution of this relationship was also praised by Screen Rant for providing multiple types of relationship in the manga across the years besides the family act something the writers noted the fans support.

The character's backstory seen in the anime's third season affected viewers according to Comic Book Resources for having lost his parents as a child and lying about his age to join a world war in a notable dark episode. Screen Rant agreed about this development in the story, describing Loid's backstory as the saddest episode in the entire series and comparing his backstory with that of Kuma from One Piece, which also aired in 2025. The writer felt that the cruelest moment for Loid's childhood was how all of his classmates die in the middle of the war shortly after their long time reunion. Anime News Network noted that Loid develops a survivor guilt during his childhood in the war and still associated Loid Forger as a separate person from Agent Twilight when recovering in the Forgers' house. ComicBook.com found Loid's past horrifying, making the anime one of the darkest series from 2025 in contrast to how lighthearted the narrative tends to be.
