= Yor Forger =

Fictional character from Spy × Family

- Spy × Family character
- Yor Forger by Tatsuya Endo
- First appearance: Spy × Family chapter 2: "Mission 2" (April 8, 2019)
- Created by: Tatsuya Endo
- Voiced by: Saori Hayami (Japanese); Natalie Van Sistine (English)

In-universe information
- Family: Yuri Briar (brother)
- Spouse: Loid Forger
- Children: Anya Forger (adopted)

Yor Forger (Japanese: ヨル・フォージャー, Hepburn: Yoru Fōjā), née Briar (ブライア, Buraia) and nicknamed Thorn Princess (いばら姫, Ibara Hime), is a character from Tatsuya Endo's manga Spy × Family. Yor is a professional assassin who also works for the city hall, and was the only person raising her brother Yuri in his childhood. Yor seeks a marriage with Loid Forger as a cover, because single adult women draw suspicion and attention in the paranoid Ostania. Neither Loid nor Yor are aware of each other's true identities, nor that their adoptive child Anya's powers allow her to know their true professions.

Yor was one of the last characters Endo created for the series as a result of needing a figure to balance Loid and Anya. While Endo seeks to balance the comedy derived from the three characters' fake identities, he found it challenging to write her brutal profession as a result of the young demography. The character is voiced by Saori Hayami in Japanese, and Natalie Van Sistine in English.

Critical response to Yor's character has been positive for her dynamic with the family, though some critics were concerned by her lack of screentime and portrayal as a housewife. Nevertheless, Yor's popularity led to a crossover with the fighting game Street Fighter 6.

== Creation ==
Manga author Tatsuya Endo originally only came up with the idea of Loid Forger and his adoptive daughter Anya. He eventually decided to add Yor as a mother figure. The core of the cast is three people hiding their true identities from one another, inspired by the anime series Code Geass and its cast who hide their true personas. Yor's personality was conceived so that she would mention violent commentaries in a polite fashion. Endo researched clothing to make her beautiful despite her violent profession. Due problems with his previous work Gekka Bijin, Endo wanted to try simpler costumes on Yor. In early sketches, Yor's design was not found beautiful so he revised it.

Yor's true profession of being a hired killer posed difficulties for Endo due to the graphic content that would result. Like Loid, Yor is often drawn in a darker fashion to show the character's true persona. Endo had no experience writing spy stories, so he decided that the manga should focus instead on the family dynamic and the lies each character tells.

=== Casting ===
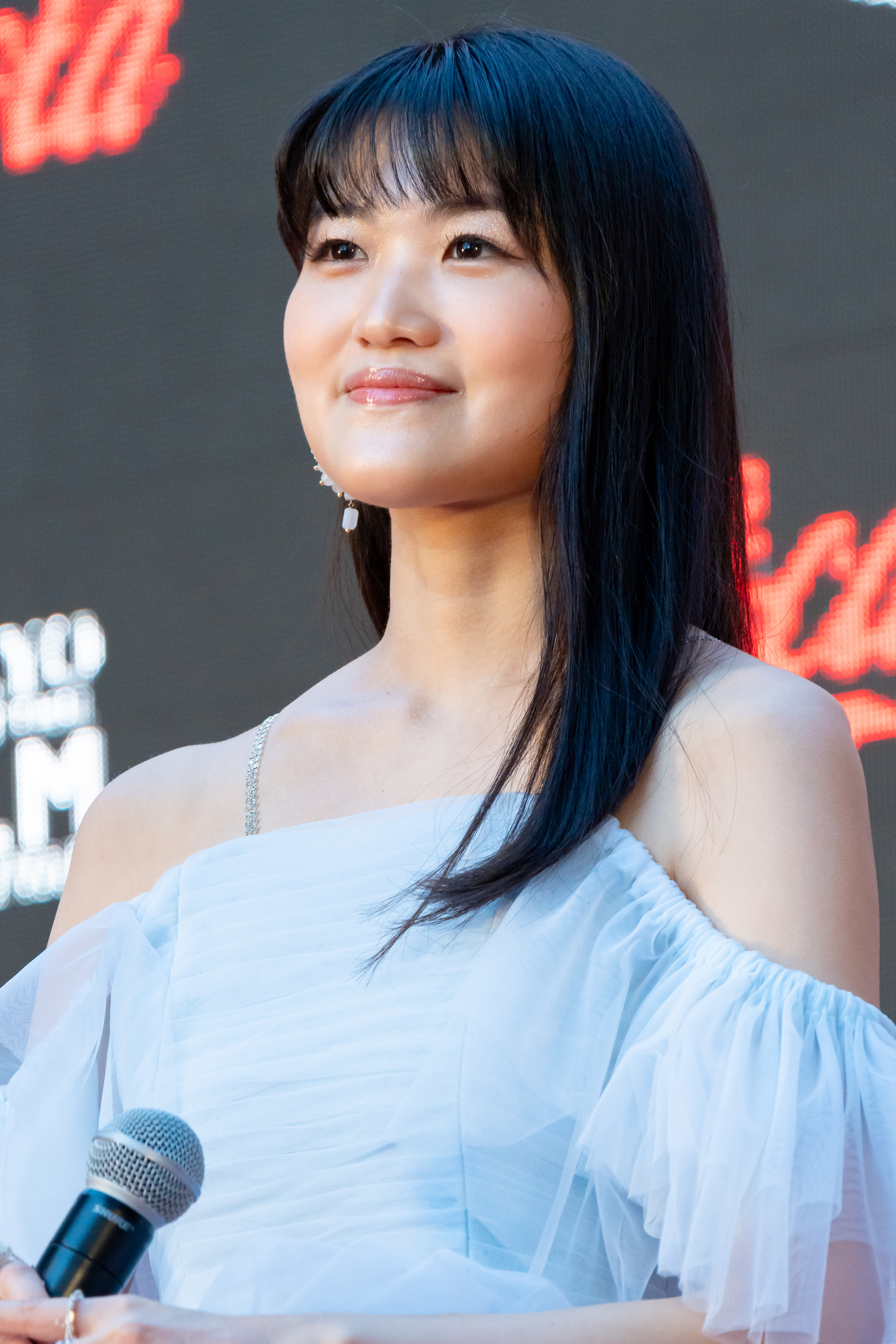
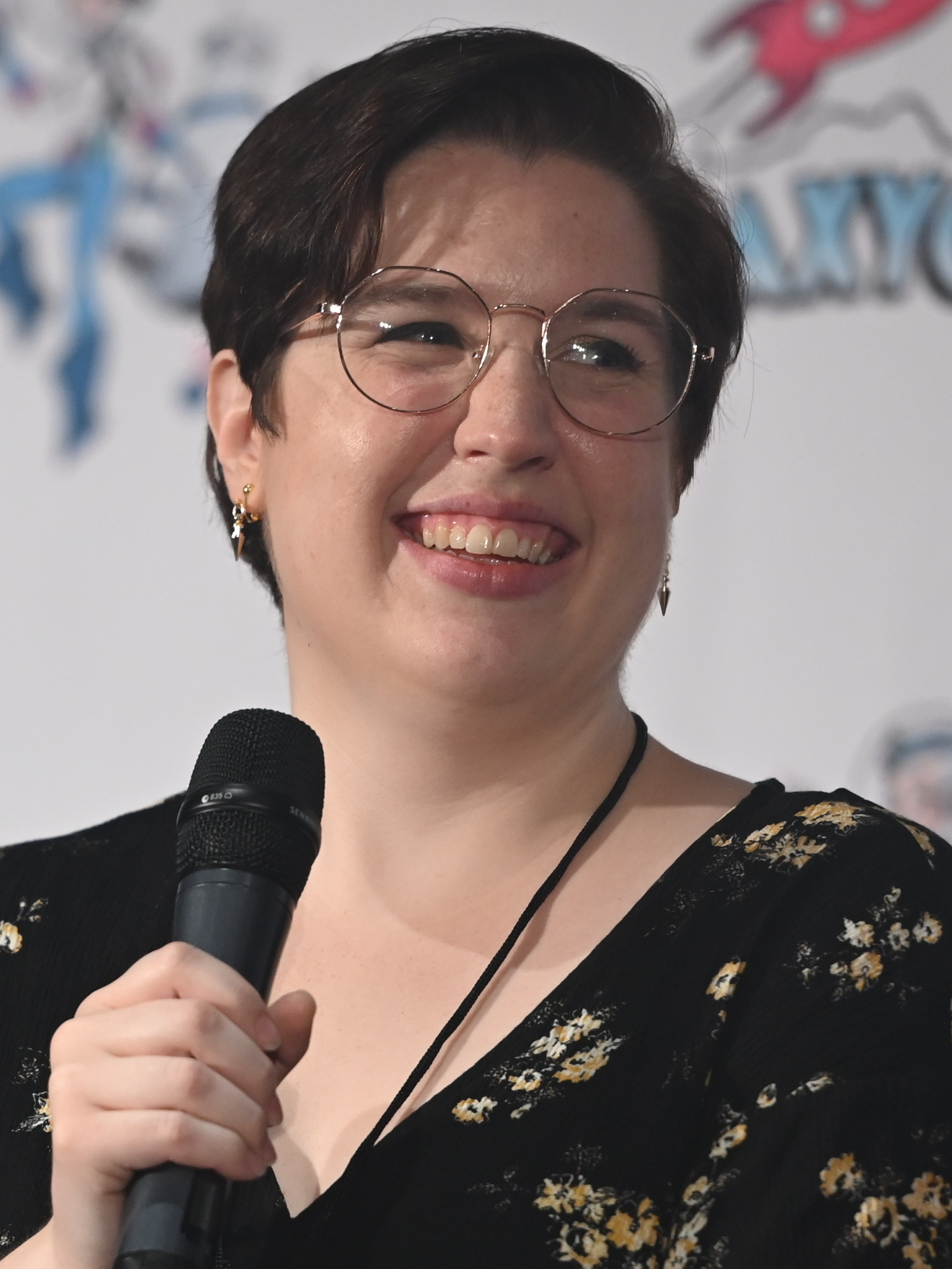
Saori Hayami (left) and Natalie Van Sistine (right) voiced Yor in the original Japanese version and English dub, respectively.

Yor Forger is voiced by Saori Hayami in Japanese. When reading the script of the series, Hayami was immersed into the story as it had a proper balance of drama and comedy. This was mostly due to the large amount of characters the series has to the point she found it difficult to stop reading the manga. As a result found genius the character of Yor and saw her in a completely different light. She was indeed offered an audition. She found the character of Yor very cute, and that is when she hoped to be chosen for the role. She believes Yor is a character worth playing because she requires a certain amount of work, mainly in balancing Yor's two sides.

In the English dub of the series, Yor is voiced by Natalie Van Sistine. Before working in the series, Sistine got roles for Crunchyroll series but always small shows. When offered the position of Yor, Sisitine decided to read the manga's first volume and got mentally attached to the role during the audition. Upon applying for the role, the director behind the English dub was surprised by the quality of her work and hired her. Sistine said that Yor felt like an actress like she immerses as a civilian who also is anxiety-ridden. She was amazed by her assassin persona which she related to due to her change of personality. Yor is also played by Fuka Yuduki, Mirei Sasaki, Sora Kazuki and Maaya Kiho.

== Role in Spy × Family ==
Yor is a 27-year-old professional assassin nicknamed "Thorn Princess", who has a day job as an employee at Berlint City Hall. She agrees to a fake marriage without knowing Loid's true background, as unmarried young women are suspected of being spies.^{[ch. 2]} She believes Loid's lie that Anya is Loid's biological daughter from a previous marriage and accepts the roles of Anya's step mother.^{[ch. 2–3]} In her everyday life, Yor is soft, caring, formally spoken and considerate to others but sometimes hindered by her airhead and absent-minded natures.^{[ch. 3, 24, 46, 65, 79]} Because of this, as well as her lack of communication and social skills, she has difficulties adjusting to the norm and thus is a frequent target of her coworker's bullying.^{[ch. 2, 14, 29, 79]} Despite all that, she always strives to be a good wife and mother for the Forgers, later developing romantic feelings for Loid.^{[ch. 9, 14, 35, 65, 87]} Yor lost her parents early. She raised her younger brother Yuri by herself, and became an assassin for the assassin group Garden at a young age to earn a living for the both of them.^{[ch. 2, 12, 44, Short 6, 53]} Neither she nor her brother are aware of each other's true jobs.^{[ch. 11–14]}

Recently, she met Melinda Desmond, Loid's target's wife, and was invited to join her circle of friends, "The Lady Patriot Society".^{[ch. 65–66]} Yor is extremely powerful and tough, as being she can kick away a speeding car, dice a tennis ball with a racket, survive bullet wounds, and withstand lethal poisons.^{[ch. Extra 2, 22, 34, 65]} She is an expert in using knives and similar sharp weapons, as well as bare hand close-quarter combat. Her weapons of choice are needle-like stilettos; they are long, have no guard, and have a ring pommel, resembling a kunai.^{[ch. 2, 4, 51–54]} Yor is not good with basic household chores, particularly cooking; her homemade meals are bad to the point of being poisonous.^{[ch. 5, 14, 24, 40]} Despite being seemingly immune to poison and her own cooking, she gets drunk easily with a small amount of alcohol.^{[ch. 6, 13, 35]}

== Reception ==
=== Popularity ===
In the 2021-2022 Newtype Anime Awards, Yor ranked sixth in the Best Female Character award while Saori Hayami ranked fourth in Best Voice Actress for her performance as Yor. At the 7th Crunchyroll Anime Awards, Yor was nominated for "Best Supporting Character". Natalie Van Sistine was nominated in the "Best Voice Artist Performance (English)" category for her performance as Yor. At the 10th edition, Ghada Omar was nominated in "Best Voice Artist Performance (Arabic)" for her character's portrayal, but lost to Tariq Obaid's Taro Sakamoto.

On July 2, 2023, it was announced that the movie was going to have a collaboration project with Street Fighter 6. An illustration drawn by Capcom's illustrator and designer Chisato Mita was revealed along with the announcement. On December 4, 2023, Capcom social media released the animated short video of Yor Forger and Street Fighter 6's character Chun-Li dueling on Suval'hal Arena stage. The animation was made by Wit Studio, with Shunsuke Aoki doing key animation and Kyōji Asano working on storyboard and character design. On January 9, 2024, Capcom revealed and released the in-game collab items, which are avatar costumes based on Yor's Thorn Princess outfit.

=== Critical reception ===
Antonio Mireles of The Fandom Post described the family setup in Spy × Family of Loid as the straight man, Yor the "dumb character" and Anya the adorable child "that readers fall in love with", as the perfect recipe for a comedy. However, he felt the humor that comes from Yor being the dumb character was underutilized. Den of Geek finds the Forgers' secrets as another reason for the series' popularity while also highlighting how despite Loid being a competent spy, his mission of becoming a good father is also hilarious. Morgana Santilli of The Beat enjoyed the chemistry between the arranged family as he notes Anya makes the trio stand out. In "I failed at cooking again: Representation of womanhood and motherhood in the action-comedy anime Spy × Family", Yor's role as a housewife was noted to be comical in the sense that her desire to be a good chef backfires and instead produces meals that negatively affect Loid and Anya when consuming it; while Yor's role alligns with societal norms, she is given multiple flaws during the narrative. In "Forging a Family: Subverting the Heteronormative Family Structure and Navigating Identities in the Anime Spy × Family", S. Mukhererjee claims the family Loid creates "subverts the heteronormative family structure that is based on blood kinship and creates space for alternative family dynamics". The family creates several dynamics when the cast interact with other characters, resulting in appealing situations.

Though Yor's and Loid's marriage is arranged for their convenience, ComicBook.com noted a major change in the narrative in 2025 when Yor realizes she has developed romantic feelings for her husband, making a major step forward to how the series was handling the cast since 2019 in the debut chapter, contrasting her new love with her dark profession she keeps secret. The evolution of this relationship was also praised by Screen Rant for providing multiple types of relationship in the manga across the years besides the family act, something the writers noted the fans support.
