= Otori =

Otori (おとり) may refer to:

- Ōtori (おおとり), a Japanese name
  - Ōtori taisha (Ōtori Grand Shrine), a Shinto shrine in Osaka, Japan.
  - Ōtori-class torpedo boat, a class of fast torpedo boats of the Imperial Japanese Navy.
  - Japanese torpedo boat Ōtori, two boats of the Imperial Japanese Navy.
- Otōri (おとおり), a drinking custom in Miyako Island, Okinawa Prefecture, Japan
