= Actor (disambiguation) =

An actor is a person who plays a role in theater, cinema or television.

Actor(s) may also refer to

== Film and entertainment ==
- Actor (album), a 2009 album by St. Vincent
- Actors (band), a Canadian post-punk band
- "Actor" (Joker Xue song), 2015 song
- "Actor" (Lilas Ikuta song), 2025
- Actor (TV series), a 2023 Iranian television series
- Actor (1978 film), a 1978 TV movie by American director Norman Lloyd
- Actor (1993 film), a 1993 film by Iranian director Mohsen Makhmalbaf
- Actor (2016 film), an Indian Kannada psychological thriller
- Actors (2000 film), a French comedy film
- Actors (2021 film), an American drama film
- A Screen Actors Guild Award, also known as the Actor

== Science and computing ==
- Actants, also called "actors", in actor-network theory (a general theory of sociological behaviour), the one who performs the act
- In Interactions of Actors Theory, excitations in any medium able to produce action, a theory of cybernetics
- Actor (UML), in requirements analysis and UML
- Actor model, in concurrency, refers to a model of concurrent computation
- Actor (programming language), an early object-oriented programming integrated development environment (IDE) for the Windows operating system
- Actor, one of the two semantic macroroles in Role and reference grammar

== Other uses ==
- 12238 Actor, Jovian asteroid
- Actor (law)
- Actor (mythology), in Greek mythology, refers to a number of characters, including the father of Menoetius and Astyoche
- Actor (policy debate), the entity that enacts a certain policy action
- ACTOR (A Commitment to Our Roots), former name of The Hero Initiative
- Backhoe, part of a digging machine, sometimes called "back actor"

== See also ==
- State actor
- Non-state actor
- The Actor (disambiguation)
- Actress (disambiguation)
- Dramatis personæ
