= Laugh (Lilas Ikuta album) =

- Standard cover

Studio album by Lilas Ikuta
- Released: December 10, 2025
- Genre: J-pop
- Length: 46:54
- Language: Japanese
- Labels: Echoes; Sony Japan
- Producers: Aki; INFX; Haruyuki Inoue; Carlos K.; Kojirō Kikuike; Tarō Kikuike; KOHD; Lee Chan-hyuk; Mwk; Kengo Ohama; Seo Dong-hwan; Takahito Uchisawa

Lilas Ikuta chronology
Sketch (2023)	Laugh (2025)

Singles from Laugh
- 1. "P.S." Released: July 7, 2023; 2. "With" Released: October 6, 2023; 3. "Seishun Ōka" Released: March 20, 2024; 4. "Humming" Released: June 1, 2024; 5. "Sign" Released: September 16, 2024; 6. "Hyakka Ryōran" Released: January 10, 2025; 7. "Dreamer" Released: March 19, 2025; 8. "Koikaze" Released: April 7, 2025; 9. "Actor" Released: October 11, 2025; 10. "Voyage" Released: October 31, 2025

Laugh is the second studio album by Japanese singer-songwriter Lilas Ikuta. It was released digitally on December 10, 2025, and physically on January 14, 2026, through Echoes and Sony Music Entertainment Japan. The album is the follow-up to her debut studio album Sketch (2023).

Ten singles preceded Laugh, including "Hyakka Ryōran" and "Koikaze", which reached the top 30 on the Billboard Japan Hot 100 and was certified for streaming by the Recording Industry Association of Japan (RIAJ). Commercially, the album reached number six on the Oricon Albums Chart and number 12 on the Billboard Japan Hot Albums.

== Background and release ==
On December 3, 2025, Lilas Ikuta announced her second studio album, titled Laugh, alongside its cover artwork. It is set to be released on December 10 to digital music and streaming platforms, and on January 14, 2026, on CD for limited and standard editions; Pre-orders for the album began on the same day. Ikuta described the album as a "collection that reflects her journey as an artist, having taken on a wide range of challenges." The album's title Laugh is a word play with "Rough".

Ikuta revealed the track list for Laugh on December 6, 2025. It features 13 tracks of all singles released since July 2023 and three new songs: "Latata", "Time Machine", and "Cafe Latte". The limited edition additionally consists of 18 tracks of collaborative, cover songs, and The First Take re-arranged version of "Koikaze", as well as a 36-page photobook taken by photographer Masumi Ishida. The singer uploaded the album's trailer on December 7 and launched its special website the next day.

== Promotion ==
On the digital release date, December 10, 2025, Ikuta partnered with Spotify to host the Laugh listening party event. She performed several songs from the album: "Actor" at the 2025 FNS Music Festival and A-Studio+, "Koikaze" and "Actor" at CDTV Live! Live! Christmas Love Song Fes, "Koikaze", "Actor", and "Voyage" at With Music, and "Koikaze" at The First Take, Music Station Super Live 2025, the 67th Japan Record Awards, and the 76th edition of Kōhaku Uta Gassen. She gave interviews about the album for Billboard Japan and Music Natalie.

The English version of the album track "Cafe Latte" was featured on the South Korean television series Surely Tomorrow (2025–2026). Yamazaki Baking chose the album's track "Latata" for the company's Lunch Pack television commercial, starting on January 1, 2026. In support of Laugh, Ikuta embarked on her second concert tour, the Laugh Live Tour, from May 5 to 24, 2026, at World Memorial Hall in Kobe, Pia Arena MM in Yokohama, and Olympic Hall in Seoul. Marasy appeared as a guest for the second-day Kobe show, Ano for the first-day Yokohama show, and Zico, Choi Ye-na, Moka Kamishiraishi, and Utaha for Seoul shows.

== Track listing ==
All tracks are written by Lilas Ikuta, except where noted.

Laugh track listing
No.	Title	Music	Arrangement	Length
1.	"Actor"		Haruyuki Inoue	3:50
2.	"Koikaze" (恋風)		Carlos K.	3:03
3.	"Latata"	Ikuta; KOHD	KOHD	3:06
4.	"Hyakka Ryōran" (百花繚乱)		KOHD	3:00
5.	"Voyage"	Ikuta; KOHD	KOHD	3:39
6.	"With"		Takahito Uchisawa	3:49
7.	"Sign"		Mwk	4:20
8.	"Cafe Latte"	Seo Dong-hwan; Lee Chan-hyuk	Seo; Lee; INFX	2:49
9.	"Seishun Ōka" (青春謳歌; featuring Ano)		Tarō Kikuike	3:48
10.	"Humming" (ハミング)		Kengo Ohama	3:39
11.	"P.S."		Kojirō Kikuike	2:53
12.	"Dreamer"		Aki	4:07
13.	"Time Machine" (タイムマシン)		K. Kikuike	4:45
Total length:				46:54

Laugh – limited edition bonus track (disc two)
No.	Title	Lyrics	Music	Arrangement	Length
1.	"Aitai" (Miliyah Kato cover)	M. Kato	M. Kato	Nobuaki Tanaka	5:19
2.	"Lens" (Fujifabric featuring Lilas Ikuta)	Shinichi Katō	S. Katō	Fujifabric	3:11
3.	"Sweet Memories" (Seiko Matsuda cover)	Takashi Matsumoto	Masaaki Ōmura	Seiji Kameda	4:09
4.	"0X1=Lovesong (I Know I Love You)" (Japanese version; Tomorrow X Together featuring Ikuta)	Slow Rabbit; RM; Derek "Mod Sun" Smith; Andrew Migliore; Melanie Joy Fontana; "Hitman" Bang; Danke; Will Simms; Gabriel Brandes; Matt Thomson; Max Lynedoch Graham; Kanata Okajima	Slow Rabbit; RM; Smith; Migliore; Fontana; Bang; Danke; Simms; Brandes; Thomson; Graham	Slow Rabbit	3:25
5.	"Hōseki" (宝石; Rei featuring Ikuta)	Ikuta	Ikuta	Esme Mori	4:12
6.	"Omokage" (おもかげ; with Milet and Aimer)	Vaundy	Vaundy	Vaundy	3:07
7.	"Baka Majime" (ばかまじめ; with Creepy Nuts and Ayase)	R-Shitei; Ayase	DJ Matsunaga; Ayase	DJ Matsunaga; Ayase	2:53
8.	"Free Free Free" (Tokyo Ska Paradise Orchestra featuring Ikuta)	Nargo; Atsushi Yanaka	Nargo; Yanaka	Tokyo Ska Paradise Orchestra	4:13
9.	"Senko Hanabi" (線香花火; Chiaki Satō featuring Ikuta)	Satō	Satō	A.G.O	3:18
10.	"Inochi no Namae" (いのちの名前; from Spirited Away)	Wakako Kaku	Joe Hisaishi	Satoshi Takebe	4:28
11.	"Nostalgia" (ノスタルジア; Ikimonogakari cover)	Yoshiki Mizuno	Mizuno	Ryōta Nakano	5:08
12.	"Zezezezettai Seiiki" (絶絶絶絶対聖域; Ano featuring Ikuta)	Ano	TK	TK	3:38
13.	"Like, Kasaneteiku" (LIKE、重ねていく; Ikusaburo Yamazaki featuring Ikuta)	Ryujin Kiyoshi	Kiyoshi	Kiyoshi	3:31
14.	"Shinsekai yori" (SHINSEKAIより; with Ano)	Inio Asano	Asano	Knoak	3:35
15.	"Yume Miru 16 Sai" (夢見る16歳; featuring Masayuki Suzuki; Shanels cover)	Yoshio Satō; Nobuyoshi Kuwano	Suzuki	Shanels	4:10
16.	"Sing Along!!!" (Eiko and Shin featuring Ikuta)	Ikuta	Ikuta	Kenmochi Hidefumi	3:30
17.	"Time to Luv" (PeanutsKun featuring Ikuta)	PeanutsKun	Nerdwitchkomugichan	Nerdwitchkomugichan	4:07
18.	"Koikaze" (from The First Take; with Marasy)	Ikuta	Ikuta	Marasy	3:14
Total length:					125:25

== Charts ==
=== Weekly charts ===
Weekly chart performance for Laugh
Chart (2025–2026)	Peak position
Japanese Albums (Oricon)	6
Japanese Combined Albums (Oricon)	5
Japanese Hot Albums (Billboard Japan)	12

=== Monthly charts ===
Monthly chart performance for Laugh
Chart (2026)	Position
Japanese Albums (Oricon)	16

== Release history ==
Release dates and formats for Laugh
Region	Date	Format	Version	Label	Ref.
Various	December 10, 2025	Digital download; streaming	Standard	Echoes; Sony Japan	
Japan	January 14, 2026	CD	Standard; limited	Echoes; Sony Japan	
