= Spy × Family season 3 =

Third season of Spy × Family

Spy × Family
- Season 3
- Japanese cover art for the first home media volume of the season, featuring Anya Forger and Bond Forger
- No. of episodes: 13

Release
- Original network: TV Tokyo
- Original release: October 4 – December 27, 2025

Season chronology
- ← Previous; Season 2

The third season of the Spy × Family anime television series was produced by Wit Studio and CloverWorks. In June 2024, a third season was announced at a special event for the series. Yukiko Imai is replacing Kazuhiro Furuhashi and Takahiro Harada as the season's director, while the remaining staff and cast reprising their roles. The series continues to follow master spy Twilight, under the alias of the psychiatrist Loid Forger, and his pretend family, consisting of his daughter Anya, a telepath, his wife Yor, an assassin known as the Thorn Princess, and the family dog Bond with precognitive power.

The third season of the anime series consists of 13 episodes. The titles of its episodes are written as "Mission" with a number (e.g. "Mission 1", "Mission 2", etc.) which the counting continues across seasons; the first episode of this season is "Mission 38". This naming convention follows the original manga's practice, which also uses "Mission" for chapter titles. This season adapts 26 main chapters of the manga, from Mission 60 to Mission 87, along with a side story: Short Mission 10.

The season aired from October 4 to December 27, 2025. The opening theme is directed by Shingo Natsume and uses the song "Hi o Mamoru" (灯を護る; lit. 'Protect the Light') by Spitz. The ending theme uses the song "Actor" by Lilas Ikuta.

The season is licensed for streaming by Crunchyroll outside of Asia. Muse Communication licenses and distributes the anime in a selection of countries in the Asia-Pacific. (Note: The countries mentioned are Bangladesh, Bhutan, Brunei, Cambodia, India, Indonesia, Laos, Malaysia, Myanmar (Burma), Nepal, Philippines, Singapore, Thailand, Vietnam, and Pakistan.)

== Episodes ==
No. overall	No. in season	Title	Directed by (Note: Production staff information is taken from the ending credits of each episode)	Written by	Storyboarded by	Original release date	Viewership rating
38	1	"Berlint Panic"; Transliteration: "Bārinto Panikku" (Japanese: バーリント・パニック)	Yasuhiro Akamatsu	Aya Yajima & Honoka Katō	Kazuhiro Furuhashi & Takashi Katagiri	October 4, 2025	N/A
38	1	"The Informant and Nightfall"; Transliteration: "Jōhōya to Tobari" (Japanese: 情報屋と〈夜帷〉)	Yasuhiro Akamatsu	Aya Yajima & Honoka Katō	Kazuhiro Furuhashi & Takashi Katagiri	October 4, 2025	N/A
"Berlint Panic": The Forger family have a fun time at a carnival until Bond has a vision of an excavator attacking the carnival. Anya discovers the culprit is an angry, overworked construction worker who is forced to work overtime at a nearby construction site. Anya tricks her parents into going to the construction site, where Loid stops the construction worker when he finally snaps, while Yor saves an old man nearby. "The Informant and Nightfall": Fiona is assigned to get forged Ostanian trade documents for strawberries to be exported to Westalis for the Westalis Trade Minister's son's birthday party. To help with her task, Fiona contacts Franky, who knows a document forger known as "Mr. Quill" who can make the fake documents. Fiona and Franky head to a disco to meet Mr. Quill, but the latter refuses their request at first. When SSS agents chase after Mr. Quill, Fiona and Franky protect him from the agents and help him escape. Some time later, Fiona manages to get the fake documents from Franky, while Franky wonders whether Fiona set up the encounter with the SSS agents to get Mr. Quill to agree to her request. Nevertheless, Franky vows never to work with Fiona again due to her unlikable demeanor.
39	2	"Avoid Getting Tonitrus Bolts"; Transliteration: "Tonito wo Kaihi Seyo" (Japanese: 〈雷(トニト)〉を回避せよ)	Ayako Kurata	Rino Yamazaki	Ayako Kurata	October 11, 2025	N/A
39	2	"Twilight's Memories I"; Transliteration: "Twilight no Kioku I" (Japanese: 黄昏の記憶I)	Ayako Kurata	Rino Yamazaki	Ayako Kurata	October 11, 2025	N/A
"Avoid Getting Tonitrus Bolts": Donna Schlag, a discipline teacher at Eden Academy who punishes students with Tonitrus Bolts for any infraction, regardless of how minor it is, inspects Anya's class. When Damian fears he will get a Tonitrus Bolt for not bringing his handkerchief, Anya gives her handkerchief to him as she has another one in her bag, only to discover she forgot to bring it, leading Schlag to give her a Tonitrus Bolt. Loid faints after learning of Anya's second Tonitrus Bolt. "Twilight's Memories": Years before he became Loid Forger/Agent Twilight, Loid was a young, happy boy who enjoyed playing soldier with his friends in Eastern Westalis' Luwen Region. However, he had a strict father who disapproved of his dream of joining the Westalis Army, as the boy was ignorant in thinking the Ostanians were evil monsters. Amidst news reports of heightened tensions between the two nations, Loid and his friends are assured by the adults that war is unlikely. After talking with the croquette seller, who has relatives in Ostania, and feeling guilty for lying to his father to get money to buy a soldier toy set, Loid plans to pay back his father and tell the truth. However, the Ostanian Army launches a surprise attack on Westalis, and Loid is caught in an explosion.
40	3	"Twilight's Memories II"; Transliteration: "Twilight no Kioku II" (Japanese: 黄昏の記憶II)	Yukiko Imai	Rino Yamazaki	Yukiko Imai	October 18, 2025 (Note: This episode aired at 11:15 p.m. JST, 15 minutes after the regular air time on TV Tokyo.)	2.6%
A horrified Loid awakes to see his town destroyed and survivors escaping. He and his mother later move to his mother's uncle's house in Kielberg for safety until another bombing raid destroys the home. Years later, with his father nowhere to be found and his mother dead, a teenage Loid joins the Westalis Army by using another person's identity and lying about his age to get revenge and kill as many Ostanian soldiers as he can. While on patrol, he encounters Franky, then an Ostanian infantryman who just deserted, and spares him. As Franky tells Loid he deserted because he believes the war was started by their country's leaders, who lied to their people about who started the war, they are attacked by Ostanian soldiers chasing Franky, and both men escape. Because of the injuries he received, Loid is transferred to Logistics, where he discovers his childhood friends are alive. However, his joy is short-lived when his friends are killed during a poorly planned campaign. Loid becomes disillusioned with the military and realizes that if more information were available, the war and the people who died could have been prevented. A WISE agent then uncovers Loid's identity theft and recruits him as a spy. Loid awakens from remembering his past after fainting from hearing of Anya's Tonitrus Bolt. When he learns she did it to protect Damian, Loid praises her for caring for her friend.
41	4	"Behind the Scandal"; Transliteration: "Sukyandaru no Uragawa" (Japanese: スキャンダルの裏側)	Kenta Mimuro	Rino Yamazaki	Kenta Mimuro	October 25, 2025	N/A
41	4	"The Path to an Imperial Scholar"; Transliteration: "Inperiaru Sukarā e no Michi" (Japanese: インペリアル・スカラーへの道)	Kenta Mimuro	Rino Yamazaki	Kenta Mimuro	October 25, 2025	N/A
"Behind the Scandal": Jonas Wellman, a famed Ostanian Opera singer who is popular in Westalis, will be joining a musical tour to Westalis to improve relations between the two nations. However, Wellman is slandered by Ostania's far-right publications, which spread scandals from questionable sources. Sylvia criticizes a rookie agent for immediately believing stories that later prove false, after most of the news is forced to retract. Nevertheless, WISE takes a death threat against Wellman seriously, and Sylvia and her team stop a disgruntled ex-Ostanian soldier from killing Wellman. With the threat stopped, the rookie hopes to see Wellman's concert to make up for doubting him, only to learn Wellman is defecting to the West after allegedly being caught cheating with the wife of an angry Mafia boss. With the rookie unsure of which story is true, Sylvia advises him to always think with his head as anyone may not be who they seem to be. "The Path to an Imperial Scholar": While Anya is waiting for the late school bus to take her home, Henderson asks her to help him carry some books to his office in exchange for some snacks. During their walk, they discuss her time at school and her second Tonitrus Bolt. Henderson tells Anya not to be discouraged, as many students had several Tonitrus Bolts like her before becoming Imperial Scholars. Despite not understanding Henderson's talk, Anya is inspired to study more and asks Loid to teach her, only for Loid to faint again, thinking she got another Tonitrus Bolt.
42	5	"The Mommy-Friends Scheme"; Transliteration: "Mama Tomo Sakusen" (Japanese: ママ友作戦)	Ryūichi Man'o	Rino Yamazaki	Tatsuyuki Nagai	November 1, 2025	N/A
When Yor heads to a high-class department store to buy snacks for Anya, she saves a rich woman named Melinda from falling down the stairs. Impressed with her agility, Melinda invites Yor to join her friends in the Lady Patriots Society in a game of volleyball. While having lunch, Melinda learns that Yor is Anya's stepmother and introduces herself as Melinda Desmond, the mother of Damian, and the wife of Donovan. While Yor tries to apologize for Anya punching Damian, Melinda strongly insists they drop the subject, since she's fine and it's just kids being kids. Because of Yor learning to be a wife and mother and unfamiliarity with the Desmond family, Melinda befriends Yor and invites her to join her and the Lady Patriots Society. Learning that Yor is now friends with Melinda, Loid hopes to use their relationship to get close to Donovan as a backup plan in case Anya fails to become an Imperial Scholar or befriend Damian. Concerned Loid will replace her with Yor, Anya intensifies her attempts to befriend Damian, only for it to backfire when she accidentally spills food on him after following Becky's advice.
43	6	"White Jealousy"; Transliteration: "Shiroi Shitto" (Japanese: 白い嫉妬)	Shinobu Sasaki	Erika Ando	Shinobu Sasaki	November 8, 2025	N/A
43	6	"The Eden College Busjacking Incident"; Transliteration: "Īden Kō Basujakku Jiken" (Japanese: イーデン校バスジャック事件)	Shinobu Sasaki	Erika Ando	Shinobu Sasaki	November 8, 2025	N/A
"White Jealousy": Loid tries to get more information on Melinda and her inner circle by being their psychiatrist, but hits a roadblock when Gerald Gorey, the hospital director, refuses to give any VIP patients to Loid out of spite due to Gorey's jealousy of Loid's popularity with both the patients and hospital staff alike, especially Fiona, who he has an unrequited crush on. When Gorey's attempts at publicly humiliating Loid all backfire, Gorey contacts the SSS by framing Loid as a spy. However, anticipating this, Franky and Fiona intercept Gorey's phone call, disguise themselves as SSS Agents, and arrest him for corruption. Loid defends Gorey and successfully pleads with the "SSS agents" to let Gorey go, earning Gorey's gratitude and respect. "The Eden College Busjacking Incident": The SSS learns that Billy Squire, one of the leaders of the Red Circus terrorist group, has returned to Ostania from abroad with his comrades. At the same time, the Eden College first-year students have a field trip to the museum. While Anya continues trying to get Damian to invite her family to visit his home, her school bus, along with another one, is hijacked by Billy and the Red Circus.
44	7	"The Red Circus"; Transliteration: "Akai Sākasu" (Japanese: 赤いサーカス)	Takahiro Harada	Erika Ando	Takahiro Harada	November 15, 2025	2.2%
Billy threatens the hostages to obey them as he wants to use their status as the children of the Ostanian elite to pressure the government to release their 17 imprisoned comrades and a safe passage to the neighboring country of Nortica. Anya uses her powers to find out where the Red Circus is bringing the school buses, and with Damian's help to distract the terrorists, Anya and Becky throw a note for help and the location where they are being taken out the window. However, Anya is caught in the act, and Billy places a bomb around her neck to threaten the students. Damien is also fitted with a neck bomb when trying to take Anya's place. However, Anya reads Billy's mind and learns that the bombs are fake. Sylvia learns of the busjacking and, realizing Operation Strix is at risk, covertly assists the manhunt. Berlint Police stop the bus carrying Anya and her class, where Billy threatens the hostages' lives unless the police meet his demands. As the police and SSS are arguing with each other, with the former wanting to save the hostages while the latter wants to kill the terrorists regardless of any civilian deaths in a potential skirmish, Yuri is assigned by the SSS to find the other school bus.
45	8	"Take Down the Busjacker"; Transliteration: "Basu Jakku Han o Seiatsu Seyo" (Japanese: バスジャック犯を制圧せよ)	Keiko Oyamada & Yohei Shindo	Erika Ando	Yoko Kanamori	November 22, 2025	N/A
As the siege continues, Billy allows Henderson to bring food to the school bus and offers to take the place of a teacher who was injured during the bus hijacking. Billy reveals to Henderson that the Red Circus was originally a peaceful student protest movement seeking freedom and equal rights for the people of Ostania, of which his daughter, Biddy, was a member. However, the government violently suppressed the protestors, which killed his daughter and led a grief-stricken Billy to join the now radicalized Red Circus to seek revenge. Elsewhere, Yuri and his SSS team manage to find the second school bus, eliminate the terrorists, and rescue the hostages. With the other bus saved, the SSS threatens Billy and his comrades to surrender or be killed. After finding out that there's a real bomb in the bus and that the SSS is sending a strike team to end the siege violently, Anya stands up to Billy, claiming she wants more food. Billy witnesses Anya's bravery, which reminds him of Biddy, and he has a change of heart, ordering his men to surrender. However, one of the terrorists, Vadim, refuses and takes Anya hostage. Before the SSS tries to shoot them, Anya is saved by Martha, who takes down Vadim with a taser, ending the siege.
46	9	"Anya's Era Has Come"; Transliteration: "Anya no Jidai Kichatta" (Japanese: アーニャのじだいきちゃった)	Tsuyoshi Tobita	Erika Ando	Yukiko Imai	November 29, 2025	N/A
As the rescued Eden students get picked up by their parents, Damian apologizes to Anya for mistreating her in the past after seeing her bravery. At the same time, Anya praises his bravery as well. Yor and Melinda arrive after hearing what happened, and both children start crying and hugging their mothers. Anya realizes Loid is also present, disguised as an SSS soldier, but he decides to quietly return home to maintain his cover. Anya is also disturbed after reading Melinda's mind, who at first loves her son dearly, but her love for him is mixed with hatred when Damian asks Melinda not to tell Donovan that he cried. Thanks to their actions during the bus-jacking incident, Anya, Damian, Becky, and Bill are rewarded with Stella Stars and become popular at Eden. When Damian gets jealous of Anya's popularity with her fellow students, he insults her and her family, which she counters, leading to a petty argument between the two that leaves everyone uninterested after seeing how childish they both are.
47	10	"Austin's Trouble"; Transliteration: "Ōsutin no Kunō" (Japanese: オースティンの苦悩)	Yumeko Iwaoka	Honoka Katō	Yumeko Iwaoka	December 7, 2025 (Note: This episode aired at 12:40 a.m. JST, 1 hour and 40 minutes after the regular air time on TV Tokyo.)	N/A
47	10	"A Normal Mixer"; Transliteration: "Futsū no Nomikai" (Japanese: フツーの飲み会)	Yumeko Iwaoka	Honoka Katō	Yumeko Iwaoka	December 7, 2025	N/A
47	10	"Moon Landing"; Transliteration: "Getsumen Chakuriku" (Japanese: げつめんちゃくりく)	Yumeko Iwaoka	Honoka Katō	Yumeko Iwaoka	December 7, 2025	N/A
"Austin's Trouble": Thomas Austin, the teacher who was injured during the bus jacking incident, seeks psychological help from Loid after waking up having nightmares since the incident. With Fiona's help, Loid learns the actual cause of the nightmares is Austin's wife, who has been harsh to her husband for years, long before the bus-jacking. Realizing Austin failing to be a good husband and helping around the house has caused his wife's mean behavior, Loid advises Austin to talk with his wife and be a better spouse to her. "A Normal Mixer": After helping her coworkers finish office work early, Yor is invited by Camilla, Millie, and Sharon to a mixer for dinner. Yor gets drunk and, misunderstanding her coworkers' comments about their partners, almost heads out to kill Loid to "appear normal." She heads home drunk later and faints when she thinks Loid is about to kiss her after helping her stand up. "Moon Landing": While watching the news about the space race between Westalis and Ostania, Damian and Emile find it boring, while Ewen finds it exciting to go to space. Ewen later bonds with Anya over their shared excitement about space, much to Damian's jealousy.
48	11	"Extreme Level 3 Situation"; Transliteration: "Reberu 3 Hijō Jitai" (Japanese: レベル3非常事態)	Yoshiki Kitai	Honoka Katō	Yoshiki Kitai	December 13, 2025	N/A
While Anya goes to the zoo with Becky and Martha, a mostly-sober Yor feels embarrassed over what happened last night with Loid and talks with him. However, Loid and Yuri are secretly called by their respective organizations for an important mission. Winston Wheeler, an undercover SSS agent who has been working as a mole at WISE HQ in Westalis, is forced to escape back to Ostania after his identity is exposed. In doing so, however, Wheeler managed to steal several encrypted files, including the locations of WISE's Ostania-based agents and information on Operation Strix. Due to the files' importance, both SSS and WISE agents head to the Shellbury region in Northwestern Ostania to either help or capture Wheeler, respectively. The SSS agents, including Yuri, are forced to hide their identities since the Ostanian Government did not approve of their mission. Yuri is contacted by Wheeler, who tells him the extraction point at a hotel has been compromised and tells his handlers to meet him at a park instead. However, when Wheeler meets his handlers at the park, it is revealed that "Wheeler" is actually a disguised Loid, using a yellow-jeweled tie pin to identify himself as Wheeler, which was part of the SSS' ploy to identify the mole within the SSS and catch Loid.
49	12	"Battle to the Death in the Sewers"; Transliteration: "Gesuidō no Shitō" (Japanese: 下水道の死闘)	Yukiko Imai	Honoka Katō	Yukiko Imai	December 20, 2025	N/A
Loid escapes from the SSS to the sewers using booby traps he set up at the park earlier and disguising himself as Yuri. Unfortunately, Loid encounters Yuri himself after the latter figures out that Twilight escaped to the sewers, leading to a fight between the two. Loid knocks Yuri unconscious but doesn't kill him after Yuri mentions Yor's name. Meanwhile, Fiona and some WISE agents trick Wheeler into exposing himself, leading to his capture and the recovery of the files. They plan to bring him back to Westalis, suspecting that Wheeler may have memorized the files, but Wheeler breaks free and escapes to the sewers, with Fiona in pursuit. An injured Loid encounters Wheeler, who figures out that Loid isn't Yuri and defeats him. Fiona catches up and is angered when Wheeler threatens Loid's life. As Wheeler mocks Fiona for having feelings for Loid, as he considered them unnecessary as a spy, an enraged Fiona punches Wheeler's left arm so hard that it breaks, along with Fiona's, much to Wheeler's surprise.
50	13	"A World Where We Cannot Survive"; Transliteration: "Ikinokorenai Sekai" (Japanese: 生き残れない世界)	Asami Nakatani	Honoka Katō	Yukiko Imai	December 27, 2025	N/A
Fiona continues to beat Wheeler ruthlessly while calling him weak for not trusting others, unlike her, as she trusts Loid, before finally knocking him out. An awakened Loid stops Fiona from killing Wheeler, as he might be useful alive in the future. They manage to escape from the SSS with the rest of WISE. Despite the mission's success in preventing WISE's secrets from being exposed, they lose their mole in the SSS. Because of their injuries, Loid and Fiona are ordered to rest and recuperate, during which Fiona, who is being cared for by Sylvia, learns that Sylvia is aware of her feelings for Loid, much to her embarrassment. An exhausted Loid returns home, where Yor explains the misunderstanding between them due to what happened the day before with her coworkers, and she is still glad to be married to him. While Yor takes care of Loid, an injured Yuri arrives, who then becomes suspicious of Loid's injured right arm since he shot Twilight there during their fight, but Loid manages to fool him since he put fake skin on his wound earlier. The episode ends with the Forger family enjoying breakfast while Anya talks about the animals she saw at the zoo.

== Home media release ==
=== Japanese ===
Toho Animation (Japan – Region 2/A)
Volume	Episodes	Cover character	Release date	Ref.
1	Mission 38–43	Anya Forger and Bond Forger	February 18, 2026	
2	Mission 44–50	Loid Forger and Yor Forger	May 20, 2026	
