= Lilas Ikuta =

Japanese singer-songwriter (born 2000)

- 幾田 りら
- Ikuta in 2026
- Born: September 25, 2000 (age 26); Tokyo, Japan
- Other names: Ikura; Lilas
- Education: Nihon University
- Occupations: Singer; songwriter
- Agents: Echoes; Creative Artists Agency
- Musical career
- Origin: Japan
- Genre: J-pop
- Instruments: Vocals; guitar
- Years active: 2015–present
- Labels: Casting Artist Syndicate; After School; Sony Japan; Echoes
- Member of: Yoasobi
- Formerly of: Plusonica
- Website: lilasikuta.jp

Lilas Ikuta (Japanese: 幾田 りら, Hepburn: Ikuta Rira; born September 25, 2000) is a Japanese singer and songwriter. She is best known as the vocalist of the duo Yoasobi with producer Ayase, under the stage name Ikura, and a former member of the cover group Plusonica. After numerous singles and extended play releases, Ikuta released two studio albums, Sketch (2023) and Laugh (2025), which peaked in the Oricon Albums Chart's top ten and were supported by the Japan top-40 singles, "Sparkle", "Lens", "Hyakka Ryōran", and "Koikaze".

== Early life and education ==
Lilas Ikuta was born on September 25, 2000, in Tokyo, Japan, and has three older siblings. She moved to Chicago, United States, in 2001, living there until she was three years old. She learned piano in the first year of elementary school, then acoustic guitar in sixth grade. She was a member of the school's music club from third to sixth grade. She also played trumpet, studied classical ballet, and performed in musicals during her childhood. Ikuta wrote her first song in elementary school and performed her first concert in middle school. She told Cinematoday that her wish to become a musician was set when her parents promised to write songs for each other for Valentine's and White Days. She attended College of Art, Nihon University in April 2019, and graduated in March 2023. As of 2026, she is currently studying abroad in New York City, United States.

== Career ==
=== 2015–2020: Early career and Yoasobi ===
Ikuta began her music career by performing on the streets and small venues with a guitar at the age of 14, as well as uploading her music and covers on YouTube. In 2015, she participated in several casting auditions, including Singin'Japan hosted by Sony Music Entertainment Japan, where she was selected as a finalist. In 2016, she participated in the artist training course, the Lesson, sponsored by Sony Japan and released her demo CD 15 no Omoi. She later became a member of cover group Plusonica until 2021.

In February 2018, Ikuta made her debut televised appearance at Kon'ya, Tanjō! Ongaku Champ. She released her first two extended plays Rerise in April 2018, and Jukebox in November 2019 through independent label After School. In 2020, Ikuta performed the Japanese version of the end-credit song "Rocket to the Moon" for the animated fantasy film Over the Moon, and released a new single, "Hikari", accompanying Kissme's exhibition Atta Koto Aru no ni, Hajime Mashite.

In 2019, Ikuta was contacted by musician and record producer Ayase, who had seen one of her cover videos on Instagram and asked her if she was willing to start a music project with him and the creative writing social media Monogatary.com, which became the start of the duo Yoasobi. Their debut single "Yoru ni Kakeru", which was released in late 2019, went viral and became a musical success in Japan, beginning Yoasobi's rise to popularity in the Japanese music scene.

=== 2021–2023: Sketch ===
On March 9, 2021, Ikuta released "Answer" for Tokio Marine & Nichido Life Insurance's Anshin Disability Insurance advertisement. She covered Seiko Matsuda's "Sweet Memories" for Takashi Matsumoto's 50th-anniversary tribute album Take Me to Kazemachi!. Ikuta re-released "Romance no Yakusoku", originally from her EP Jukebox, on August 14, accompanied love reality series Kyō, Suki ni Narimashita: Himawari-hen. She voiced Hiro-chan in the 2021 animated science fantasy film Belle. Additionally in 2021, Ikuta featured on Fujifabric's "Tarinai Sukunai" from their eleventh studio album I Love You, Tomorrow X Together's Japanese version of "0X1=Lovesong (I Know I Love You)" from the group's first Japanese EP Chaotic Wonderland, and Rei's "Hōseki", and collaborated with Milet and Aimer for The First Take's "Omokage" to advertise Sony's wireless noise-cancelling headphones. The trio performed "Omokage" at the 73rd NHK Kōhaku Uta Gassen on December 31, 2022.

Ikuta's "Sparkle" was released on January 17, 2022, as a theme for the TV program Kyō, Suki ni Narimashita: Mikan-hen and Sotsugyō-hen 2022. She collaborated with hip-hop duo Creepy Nuts and Ayase for the single "Baka Majime", released on March 20. It accompanied the All Night Nippon 55th-anniversary stage Ano Yoru o Oboe Teru. The single "Lens", a theme for the TBS drama Jizoku Kanō na Koi desu ka?: Chichi to Ko no Kekkon Kōshin Kyoku, was released on June 14. Ikuta featured on Tokyo Ska Paradise Orchestra's single "Free Free Free", released on July 27. She was in charge of Fuji TV's 2022 FIFA World Cup's theme "Jump", released on November 20. In January 2023, Ikuta released "Tanpopo" for NHK's Drama 10 Ōoku, which preceded her debut studio album Sketch, issued on March 8. The album debuted at number four on the Oricon Albums Chart, and number two on the Billboard Japan Hot Albums.

=== 2023–2026: Laugh ===
Ikuta features on Chiaki Satō's single "Senkō Hanabi" from her third studio album Butterfly Effect (2023), released on June 14, 2023. She released the singles "P.S." for the film 1 Byō Saki no Kare on July 7, and "With" on October 6, inspired by the 2023 film Analog. In 2024, Ikuta voiced the main character Kadode Koyama in the two-part anime film Dead Dead Demon's Dededede Destruction, and performed songs for the film—"Zezezezettai Seiiki" (Ano featuring Ikuta), and "Seishun Ōka" (Ikuta featuring Ano). The latter was released on March 20. She participated in Ikimonogakari's compilation album Ikimonogakari Meets, covering the song "Nostalgia", and Ikusaburo Yamazaki's album The Handsome on "Like, Kasaneteiku".

Ikuta released "Humming" on June 1, 2024, which was used as a theme for the morning show Mezamashi Saturday, starting on April 6. Her song "Sign" is used as a theme for horror web series Tōmei na Watashi-tachi, which was available on September 16. Ikuta performed "Shinsekai yori" with Ano for the anime series version of Dead Dead Demon's Dededede Destruction. In 2025, Ikuta performed "Hyakka Ryōran", an opening theme for the second season of The Apothecary Diaries, "Nameless Faces" for video game Honkai: Star Rail in both English and Japanese, "Koikaze", a theme for Kyō, Suki ni Narimashita: New Zealand-hen, "Here, Tomorrow" with Kevin Penkin for MOBA game League of Legends, "Actor", an ending theme for the third season of Spy × Family, and "Voyage", a theme for high school dance competition Love Dance 2026.

Ikuta released her second studio album, titled Laugh, digitally on December 10, 2025, and physically on January 14, 2026. To promote the album, she embarked on her concert tour in May. She sang a song for South Korean television series Surely Tomorrow, titled "Caffe Latte", and collaborated with South Korean rapper Zico for "Duet". The singer performed as a soloist for the first time at the 76th NHK Kōhaku Uta Gassen with "Koikaze".

=== 2026–present: Further releases and acting career ===
In 2026, Ikuta released the fourth song accompanying Kyō, Suki ni Narimashita, titled "Puzzle", for Daegu Edition. and performed "Stay with Me" for an anime adaptation of fictional character Rilakkuma by Production I.G, which she also provides the narration. Ikuta collaborated with composer Joe Hisaishi on creating and performing the theme song for video game Professor Layton and the New World of Steam (2026). As an actress, she portrayed Michiyo Azusa in the 2026 historical film Sukiyaki. She will star in the 2027 film Kuroneko as the title role, along with Koshi Mizukami.

== Artistry ==
Ikuta has cited Taylor Swift as her major music influence, as well as Arashi, Ikimonogakari, Radwimps, and Yui. She was influenced by Western music such as songs from Disney, folk, and country music, as well as Japanese R&B and hip-hop. Ikuta's lyrics are mostly about daily life, dream, and love, reflecting her "fragile heart".

== Endorsements ==
In September 2025, Ikuta was chosen to be a global ambassador for Coach New York, alongside Elle Fanning and Soyeon.

== Discography ==
=== Studio albums ===
List of studio albums, showing selected details, chart positions, and sales
Title	Details	Peak positions			Sales
Title	Details	JPN	JPN Cmb.	JPN Hot	Sales
Sketch	Released: March 8, 2023; Label: Sony Japan; Formats: CD, CD+BD, DL, streaming	4	3	2	JPN: 26,841
Laugh	Released: December 10, 2025; Label: Echoes, Sony Japan; Formats: CD, DL, streaming	6	5	12	JPN: 24,226 (Note: Japan physical and digital combined sale figures for Laugh)

=== Extended plays ===
List of extended plays, showing selected details
Title	Details
Rerise	Released: April 21, 2018; Label: After School; Formats: CD; Track listing: 1. "'17"; 2. "Teenager"; 3. "Shiroi Koi" (白い恋); 4. "Yume Oi Bito" (夢追い人); 5. "Haru no Mama de" (春のままで)
Jukebox	Released: November 16, 2019; Label: After School; Formats: CD, DL, streaming; Track listing: 1. "Omajinai" (おまじない); 2. "Tōriame" (通り雨); 3. "Romance no Yakusoku" (ロマンスの約束); 4. "Love Letter" (ラブレター); 5. "Mayonaka no Kimi to" (真夜中の君と)

=== Demos ===
List of demos, showing selected details
Title	Details
15 no Omoi	Released: August 26, 2016; Label: After School; Formats: CD; Track listing: 1. "Kono Chiisana Mune ni" (この小さな胸に); 2. "Anata e" (あなたへ); 3. "One Day"; 4. "Yoake" (夜明け)

=== Singles ===
==== As lead artist ====
List of singles as lead artist, showing year released, selected chart positions, certifications, and album name
Title	Year	Peak positions				Certifications	Album
Title	Year	JPN	JPN Cmb.	JPN Hot	KOR	Certifications	Album
"Rocket to the Moon"	2020	—	—	—	—		Over the Moon (Music from the Netflix Film)
"Hikari"	2020	—	—	—	—		Sketch
"Answer"	2021	—	—	96	—	RIAJ: Platinum (st.)	Sketch
"Sweet Memories"	2021	—	—	—	—		Take Me to Kazemachi!
"Romance no Yakusoku"	2021	—	—	—	—	RIAJ: Gold (st.)	Jukebox and Sketch
"Omokage" (with Milet and Aimer)	2021	—	27	11	—	RIAJ: Platinum (st.)	Non-album singles
"Sparkle"	2022	—	26	35	—	RIAJ: 2× Platinum (st.)	Sketch
"Baka Majime" (with Creepy Nuts and Ayase)	2022	—	50	38	—	RIAJ: Platinum (st.)	Ensemble Play
"Lens"	2022	—	24	12	—	RIAJ: Gold (st.)	Sketch
"Jump"	2022	—	—	61	—		Sketch
"Tanpopo"	2023	—	—	—	—		Sketch
"P.S."	2023	—	—	—	—		Laugh
"With"	2023	—	—	—	—		Laugh
"Seishun Ōka" (featuring Ano)	2024	14	—	—	—		Laugh
"Humming"	2024	—	—	—	—		Laugh
"Sign"	2024	—	—	—	—		Laugh
"Shinsekai yori" (with Ano)	2024	—	—	—	—		Dead Dead Demon's DeDeDeDe Destruction
"Hyakka Ryōran"	2025	11	19	25	—	RIAJ: Gold (st.)	Laugh
"Dreamer"	2025	—	—	—	—		Laugh
"Koikaze"	2025	—	21	19	—	RIAJ: Platinum (st.)	Laugh
"Here, Tomorrow" (with Kevin Penkin)	2025	—	—	—	—		Laugh
"Actor"	2025	18	—	—	—		Laugh
"Voyage"	2025	—	—	—	—		Laugh
"Duet" (with Zico)	2025	—	—	64	39		Non-album singles
"Puzzle"	2026	—	—	57	—		Non-album singles
"Stay with Me"	2026	—	—	—	—		Non-album singles
"Start of Something New (Lilas Version)"	2026	—	—	—	—		Non-album singles
"—" denotes releases that did not chart or were not released in that region.

==== As featured artist ====
List of singles as featured artist, showing year released, selected chart positions, certifications, and album name
Title	Year	Peak positions			Album
Title	Year	JPN	JPN Cmb.	JPN Hot	Album
"Tarinai Sukunai" (Fujifabric featuring Lilas Ikuta)	2021	—	—	—	I Love You
"0X1=Lovesong (I Know I Love You)" (Japanese version) (Tomorrow X Together featuring Lilas Ikuta)	2021	—	42	42	Chaotic Wonderland and Sweet
"Hōseki" (Rei featuring Lilas Ikuta)	2021	—	—	—	Just Wanna Sing
"Free Free Free" (Tokyo Ska Paradise Orchestra featuring Lilas Ikuta)	2022	23	—	24	Junk or Gem
"Senko Hanabi" (Chiaki Satō featuring Lilas Ikuta)	2023	—	—	76	Butterfly Effect
"Zezezezettai Seiiki" (Ano featuring Lilas Ikuta)	2024	13	—	45	Bone Born Bomb
"Like, Kasaneteiku" (Ikusaburo Yamazaki featuring Lilas Ikuta)	2024	—	—	—	The Handsome
"Nameless Faces" (English version) (HoYo-Mix featuring Lilas Ikuta)	2025	—	—	—	Non-album singles
"Nameless Faces" (Japanese version) (HoYoFair featuring Lilas Ikuta)	2025	—	—	—	Non-album singles
"—" denotes releases that did not chart or were not released in that region.

==== Promotional singles ====
List of promotional singles, showing year released, and album name
Title	Year	Album
"Aitai"	2020	Inspire: Miliyah Kato Tribute
"Nostalgia"	2024	Ikimonogakari Meets
"Yume Miru 16 Sai" (Lias featuring Masayuki Suzuki)	2025	All Time Doo Wop
"Caffe Latte" (English version)	2025	Lilas X Surely Tomorrow

=== Guest appearances ===
List of non-single guest appearances, showing year released, other performing artists, and album name
Title	Year	Other artist(s)	Album
"Inochi no Namae"	2023	—N/a	Ghibli o Utau
"Sing Along!!!"	2025	Eiko, Shin	Count on Me
"Time to Luv"	2025	PeanutsKun	Tele Club II
"Perfectos Imperfectos"	2025	Pablo Alborán	KM0
"Plus rien"	2025	Orelsan	La fuite en avant
"Sekishunka"	2026	Sumika	"Honto"

=== Songwriting and production credits ===
All song credits are adapted from the Japanese Society for Rights of Authors, Composers and Publishers's database unless stated otherwise.

List of songs written by Lilas Ikuta for other artists, showing year released, artist name, and name of the album
Song	Year	Artist	Album	Lyricist	Composer	Arranger
"Dreamer"	2023	Eiko	Dreamer	Yes	Yes	No
"True"	2026	Hey! Say! JUMP	Juliet	Yes	Yes	No

== Filmography ==
=== Film ===
Title	Year	Role	Note	Ref.
Belle	2021	Hiro-chan (voice)		
Dead Dead Demon's Dededede Destruction	2024	Kadode Koyama (voice)		
Ya Boy Kongming! The Movie	2024	Herself	Cameo	
Yoasobi 5th Anniversary Dome Live 2024 "Surrealism"	2025	Herself	Concert film	
Sukiyaki	2026	Michiyo Azusa		
Kuroneko	2027	Kuroneko	Lead role	

=== Television ===
Title	Year	Role	Note	Ref.
Ya Boy Kongming!	2023	Herself	Cameo (episode 10)	
Lilas: From Street to Dreams	2026	Herself	Documentary	
Lilas Ikuta Dreams & Memories	2026	Herself	Travel show	

== Concerts ==
- 1st One Man Live: Bouquet (2019)
- MTV Unplugged: Lilas Ikuta (2022)
- 1st One Man Tour: Sketch (2023)
- Laugh Live Tour (2026)

== Awards and nominations ==
Name of the award ceremony, year presented, award category, nominee(s) of the award, and the result of the nomination
Award ceremony	Year	Category	Nominee(s)/work(s)	Result	Ref.
AnimaniA Awards	2026	Best Anime Song	"In Bloom"	Nominated	
Crunchyroll Anime Awards	2026	Best Anime Song	"In Bloom"	Nominated	
Crunchyroll Anime Awards	2026	Best Ending Sequence	"Actor"	Nominated	
Fan ga Atsui, Anime Manga Awards	2025	Best Theme Song	"Hyakka Ryōran"	Won	
Japan Expo Awards	2026	Daruma for Best Opening	"In Bloom"	Nominated	
Japan Expo Awards	2026	Daruma for Best Ending	"Actor"	Nominated	
Japan Record Awards	2025	Grand Prix	"Koikaze"	Nominated	
Japan Record Awards	2025	Excellent Work Award	"Koikaze"	Won	
MAMA Awards	2026	Best Rap & Hip Hop Performance	"Duet"	Won	
MTV Video Music Awards Japan	2025	Video of the Year	"Zezezezettai Seiiki" "Seishun Ōka"	Nominated	
MTV Video Music Awards Japan	2025	Best Collaboration Video (Japan)	"Zezezezettai Seiiki" "Seishun Ōka"	Won	
Music Awards Japan	2026	Best Cross-Over Collaboration Song	"Duet"	Nominated	

== Listicles ==
Name of publisher, year listed, name of listicle, and placement result
Publisher	Year	Listicle	Result	Ref.
Forbes Japan	2026	30 Under 30 Japan	Placed	
