= Joyu =

Joyu or Joyus may refer to:

- An Actress or Joyū, a 1956 Japanese film
- "Actress" or "Joyū", a story in volume 1 of Gigant
- "Actress" or "Joyū", a story in volume 11 of Kasane
- Joyū, a 1992 album by Kan Mikami
- Joyus, an Indian online shopping platform founded by Sukhinder Singh Cassidy

== People with the surname ==
- Fumihiro Joyu (born 1962), spokesman of Japanese new religious group Aum Shinrikyo

== See also ==
- Actress (disambiguation)
- Joyeux (disambiguation)
