= Higashi-hennazaki =

Cape on southeastern Miyako Island, Okinawa Prefecture, Japan

Coordinates: 24°43′08″N 125°28′10″E

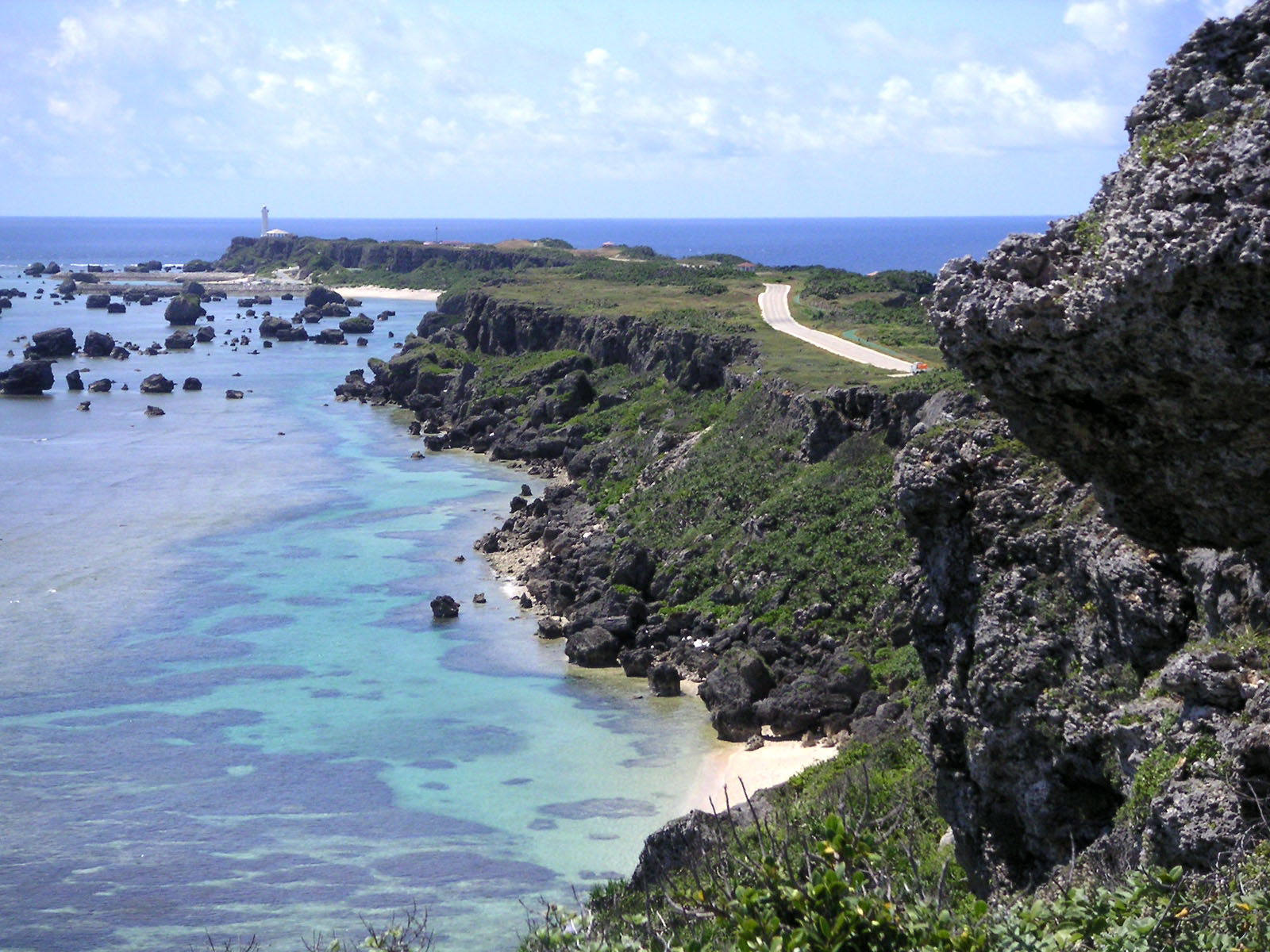
View of Higashi-Hennazaki, Miyakojima

Higashi-hennazaki and Hennazaki lighthouse, 2020

The cape of Higashi-henna-zaki (東平安名岬, Miyako: Agari-pyauna-zaki) is a nationally designated Place of Scenic Beauty located at the southeasternmost point of Miyako Island, Okinawa Prefecture, Japan. It is connected by a road No. 83. The promontory is 2 km long and 140 – 200 m wide.

At the end of the cape is a white lighthouse which gives 320° panorama view of the ocean, a very popular spot for sunrise viewing. The lighthouse was erected in 1967 with assistance from the Japanese government after a man called Mr. Sunakawa, who was head of the local fishing union, had become concerned by several severe boating incidents near the coast of Higashi Hennazaki.
