= Sketch (Lilas Ikuta album) =

- Standard cover

Studio album by Lilas Ikuta
- Released: March 8, 2023
- Genre: J-pop
- Length: 40:12
- Language: Japanese
- Label: Sony Japan
- Producer: Ginnojō Hoshi; Tarō Kikuike; KOHD; Kazuma Nagasawa; Ryōta Nakano; Shūta Nishida; Kengo Ohhama

Lilas Ikuta chronology
Jukebox (2019)	Sketch (2023)	Laugh (2025)

Singles from Sketch
- 1. "Hikari" Released: December 25, 2020; 2. "Answer" Released: March 9, 2021; 3. "Romance no Yakusoku" Released: August 14, 2021; 4. "Sparkle" Released: January 17, 2022; 5. "Lens" Released: June 14, 2022; 6. "Jump" Released: November 20, 2022; 7. "Tanpopo" Released: January 17, 2023

Sketch is the debut studio album by Japanese singer-songwriter Lilas Ikuta. It was released on March 8, 2023, through Sony Music Entertainment Japan. The album was described as her diary and wings flying freely. Commercially, Sketch peaked at number four on the Oricon Albums Chart and number two on the Billboard Japan Hot Albums.

== Background and release ==
On January 17, 2023, on the same day as the single "Tanpopo" release, Ikuta announced her debut studio album, titled Sketch, set to be released on March 8. The CD came in two editions—limited and standard. The album's cover artworks—photographed by Toshio Ohno—for each edition and track list were revealed on February 1, including singles released since 2020, and her performance at Japanese edition of MTV Unplugged in November 2022. Ikuta described Sketch's lyrics as her diary from her heart and melodies as wings that allow feelings to fly freely.

== Promotion ==
To promoted Sketch, Ikuta performed "Sparkle" at Music Station on February 17, 2023, "Jump" at Love Music on March 5, "Lens" at CDTV Live! Live! on March 6, "Answer" and "Tanpopo" at Songs+Plus on March 8. She also gave an interview for the April 2023 issue of Ciao. Four track's music videos were premiered during the album promotion—"Tanpopo" on February 7, "Circle" on March 8, "Answer" on March 25, and "Midnight Talk" on July 5. The singer embarked on her first One Man Tour: Sketch from July 6 to 11 in three cities: Nagoya, Osaka, and Yokohama.

== Commercial performance ==
Sketch debuted at number four on the Oricon Albums Chart for the issue dated March 20, 2023, selling 17,750 CD copies, and topped the Digital Albums Chart with 2,583 units. It resulted in the album peaked at number three on the Combined Chart. For Billboard Japan, Sketch entered the Hot Albums dated March 15 at number two, behind NMB48's NMB13. It earned 18,125 physical units, peaked at number four on the Top Albums Sales; and 2,116 downloads, landed at number one on the Download Albums.

== Track listing ==
All tracks are written by Lilas Ikuta.

Sketch track listing
No.	Title	Arrangement	Length
1.	"Answer"	KOHD	4:02
2.	"Circle" (サークル)	Kazuma Nagasawa	3:15
3.	"Sparkle" (スパークル)	Ryōta Nakano	3:30
4.	"Midnight Talk"	Tarō Kikuike	3:39
5.	"Tanpopo" (蒲公英)	Kengo Ohhama	3:11
6.	"Jump"	KOHD	3:47
7.	"Lens" (レンズ)	KOHD	3:53
8.	"Kichijōji" (吉祥寺)	Ohhama	2:49
9.	"Hikari" (ヒカリ)	Nagasawa	4:04
10.	"Hōseki" (宝石)	Shūta Nishida	4:15
11.	"Romance no Yakusoku" (ロマンスの約束)	Ginnojō Hoshi	3:42
Total length:			40:12

Sketch – CD bonus track
No.	Title	Arrangement	Length
12.	"Sparkle" (from the First Take)	Nakano	3:30
13.	"Lens" (from the First Take)	KOHD	3:53
Total length:			47:36

Sketch – Blu-ray bonus track: MTV Unplugged: Lilas Ikuta
No.	Title	Length
1.	"Hikari"	5:02
2.	"Romance no Yakusoku"	3:32
3.	"Omokage" (おもかげ; solo version)	3:19
4.	"Jump"	3:44
5.	"Lens"	4:11
6.	"Kaijū no Ude no Naka" (怪獣の腕のなか; Kinoko Teikoku cover)	3:41
7.	"Hōseki"	4:41
8.	"Ginger" (Tomoo cover)	3:24
9.	"Sparkle"	3:45
10.	"Answer"	4:22
Total length:		1:39:36

== Charts ==
=== Weekly charts ===
Weekly chart performance for Sketch
Chart (2023)	Peak position
Japanese Albums (Oricon)	4
Japanese Combined Albums (Oricon)	3
Japanese Hot Albums (Billboard Japan)	2

=== Monthly charts ===
Monthly chart performance for Sketch
Chart (2023)	Position
Japanese Albums (Oricon)	11

=== Year-end charts ===
Year-end chart performance for Sketch
Chart (2023)	Position
Japanese Hot Albums (Billboard Japan)	83

== Release history ==
Release dates and formats for Sketch
Region	Date	Format	Version	Label	Ref.
Various	March 8, 2023	Digital download; streaming	Digital	Sony Japan	
Japan	March 8, 2023	CD; CD+Blu-ray	Standard; deluxe	Sony Japan	
Taiwan	April 28, 2023	CD	Standard	Sony Taiwan	
