= Duet (Zico and Lilas Ikuta song) =

Single by Zico and Lilas Ikuta
- Language: Korean; Japanese; English
- Released: December 19, 2025
- Studio: Ingrid (Seoul)
- Genre: Hip-hop
- Length: 2:26
- Label: KOZ
- Composers: Zico; Eun Hee-young; No Identity
- Lyricists: Zico; Lilas Ikuta
- Producer: Zico

Zico singles chronology
"Eko Eko" (2024)	"Duet" (2025)	"Yin and Yang" (2026)

Lilas Ikuta singles chronology
"Voyage" (2025)	"Duet" (2025)	"Puzzle" (2026)

Music video
- "Duet" on YouTube

"Duet" is a song by South Korean rapper Zico and Japanese singer-songwriter Lilas Ikuta. It was released as a single through KOZ Entertainment on December 19, 2025, alongside its accompanying music video. The song won Best Rap & Hip Hop Performance at the 2026 MAMA Awards.

== Background and release ==
While writing "Duet", South Korean rapper Zico needed a vocalist who "could hit high notes while also handling fast-paced parts that were difficult to distinguish between rap and singing." He thought Lilas Ikuta, whom the rapper enjoys in her solo music, including her duo Yoasobi, could handle this perfectly. The song was written for a year before its release, and features Korean, Japanese, and English lyrics.

On December 9, 2025, Zico uploaded a 25-second video captioned "Duet, Anyone?", teasing a snippet of an upcoming song. The footage shows Zico sitting and dancing in the studio to an upbeat track, lamenting, "It's so good, but I haven't found anyone to do it with." The next three days, Japanese singer-songwriter Lilas Ikuta confirmed collaboration on the rapper's song, titled "Duet", with a release date of December 19. On December 13, the rapper posted another video depicting a meeting and discussing between him and Ikuta. The single's concept photos express Zico's free-spirited attire, which contrasts sharply with Lilas's more formal attire.

== Music video ==
An accompanying music video for "Duet" premiered on December 19, 2025, alongside the single's release. A 20-second teaser video was uploaded two days before. Directed by Bang Jae-yeob and filmed in Japan, the visuals depict Zico and Ikuta beginning dancing with arm swing movement before spreading to other people, from children to adults, seemingly in sync across the streets, classrooms, and offices.

== Live performances ==
Zico performed "Duet" for the first time, alongside "Tough Cookie" and "No You Can't" under the theme "Count It!", on December 20, 2025, at the 2025 Melon Music Awards, held at Gocheok Sky Dome. Ikuta made a surprise appearance on the stage. They performed the song at Music Station Super Live 2025 on December 26, The First Take on January 7, 2026, Zico's Tokyo Drive concert at Keio Arena Tokyo on February 7, 2026, and Ikuta's Laugh Live Tour at Olympic Hall, Seoul, on May 25.

== Accolades ==
List of awards and nominations received by "Duet"
Ceremony	Year	Category	Result	Ref.
MAMA Awards	2026	Best Rap & Hip Hop Performance	Won	
Music Awards Japan	2026	Best Cross-Over Collaboration Song	Nominated	

== Credits and personnel ==
Personnel

- Zico – lead vocals, background vocals, lyrics, composition, arrangement, producer
- Lilas Ikuta – lead vocals, background vocals, lyrics
- Eun Hee-young – background vocals, composition, arrangement, bass, brass, electric piano, guitar
- No Identity – composition, arrangement, brass, drums, MIDI, programming, synthesizer, mixing
- Jung Eun-kyung – recording, vocal editing
- Yang Ga – Dolby Atmos mixing
- Kwon Nam-woo – mastering

Locations

- Ingrid Studio – recording, vocal editing
- Hybe Studio – Dolby Atmos mixing
- 821 Sound – mastering

== Charts ==
=== Weekly charts ===
Weekly chart performance for "Duet"
Chart (2025–2026)	Peak position
Japan Hot 100 (Billboard)	64
South Korea (Circle)	39
South Korea Hot 100 (Billboard)	16

=== Monthly charts ===
Monthly chart performance for "Duet"
Chart (2026)	Position
South Korea (Circle)	57

== Release history ==
Release dates and formats for "Duet"
Region	Date	Format	Label	Ref.
Various	December 19, 2025	CD; digital download; streaming	KOZ	
