= Koikaze (song) =

Single by Lilas Ikuta

from the album Laugh
- Language: Japanese
- Released: April 7, 2025
- Genre: J-pop
- Length: 3:02
- Label: Echoes; Sony Japan
- Songwriter: Lilas Ikuta
- Producer: Carlos K.

Lilas Ikuta singles chronology
"Dreamer" (2025)	"Koikaze" (2025)	"Actor" (2025)

Music video
- "Koikaze" on YouTube

"Koikaze" (Japanese: 恋風; lit. 'Love wind') is a song by Japanese singer-songwriter Lilas Ikuta from her second studio album, Laugh (2025). It was released as a single on April 7, 2025, through Echoes and Sony Music Entertainment Japan. "Koikaze" served as the theme song for Abema's dating reality show Kyō, Suki ni Narimashita: New Zealand Edition, the third song recorded for the show.

Commercially, "Koikaze" reached number 19 on the Billboard Japan Hot 100 and number 21 on the Oricon Combined Singles Chart, and was certified platinum for streaming by the Recording Industry Association of Japan (RIAJ). The song won the Excellent Work Award and was nominated for the Grand Prix at the 67th Japan Record Awards. Its accompanying music video, directed by Tsukumi Matsunaga and starring actress Kiara Nakanishi, premiered on June 9.

== Background and release ==
In 2021, Lilas Ikuta's "Romance no Yakusoku" featured as a theme for the Sunflower edition of Abema's dating reality show Kyō, Suki ni Narimashita. The next year, she performed the original song "Sparkle" for the show's Mikan and Graduation 2022 editions. About three years later, on March 25, 2025, Abema announced that Ikuta's song "Koikaze" would serve as a theme for the New Zealand edition of Kyō, Suki ni Narimashita, as well as The First Take's live version of "Sparkle" as an insert song. It was available to digital music and streaming platforms on April 7, alongside "Sparkle" (from The First Take), in conjunction with the first episode of the show premiere. The song was later included on the singer's second studio album, Laugh.

== Composition ==
"Koikaze" evokes the arrival of spring and expresses the protagonist's tender emotions from falling in love and caring for someone who loves, comparing it to a gentle breeze. The song talks about confusion and conflict that come when a new relationship begins, before ultimately deciding to be honest about the protagonist's feelings.

== Music video ==
A special music video for "Koikaze" was uploaded on May 19, 2025, featuring footage from Kyō, Suki ni Narimashita: New Zealand Edition, which aired in April. Afterwards, the official music video premiered later on June 9. Directed by Tsukumi Matsunaga and starring actress Kiara Nakanishi, the dreamy visuals capture an emotional transformation of the protagonist as she falls in love.

== Live performances ==
Ikuta debuted the live performance of "Koikaze" at FNS Music Festival Summer on July 2, 2025. She later performed the song at Best Hits Kayosai on November 13, CDTV Live! Live! Christmas Love Song Fes. on December 15, and With Music on December 20, Music Station Super Live 2025 and The First Take with pianist Marasy on December 26, the 67th Japan Record Awards on December 30, and the 76th edition of Kōhaku Uta Gassen on December 31.

== Accolades ==
Awards and nominations for "Koikaze"
Ceremony	Year	Award	Result	Ref.
Japan Record Awards	2025	Grand Prix	Nominated	
Japan Record Awards	2025	Excellent Work Award	Won	

== Charts ==
=== Weekly charts ===
Weekly chart performance for "Koikaze"
Chart (2025)	Peak position
Japan Combined Singles (Oricon)	21
Japan Hot 100 (Billboard)	19

=== Year-end charts ===
Year-end chart performance for "Koikaze"
Chart (2025)	Position
Japan Hot 100 (Billboard)	56

== Certifications ==
Certifications for "Koikaze"
Region	Certification	Certified units/sales
Streaming
Japan (RIAJ)	Platinum	100,000,000^{†}
^{†} Streaming-only figures based on certification alone.

== Release history ==
Release dates and formats for "Koikaze"
Region	Date	Format	Label	Ref.
Various	April 7, 2025	Digital download; streaming	Echoes; Sony Japan	
