= Paantu =

Japanese annual festival

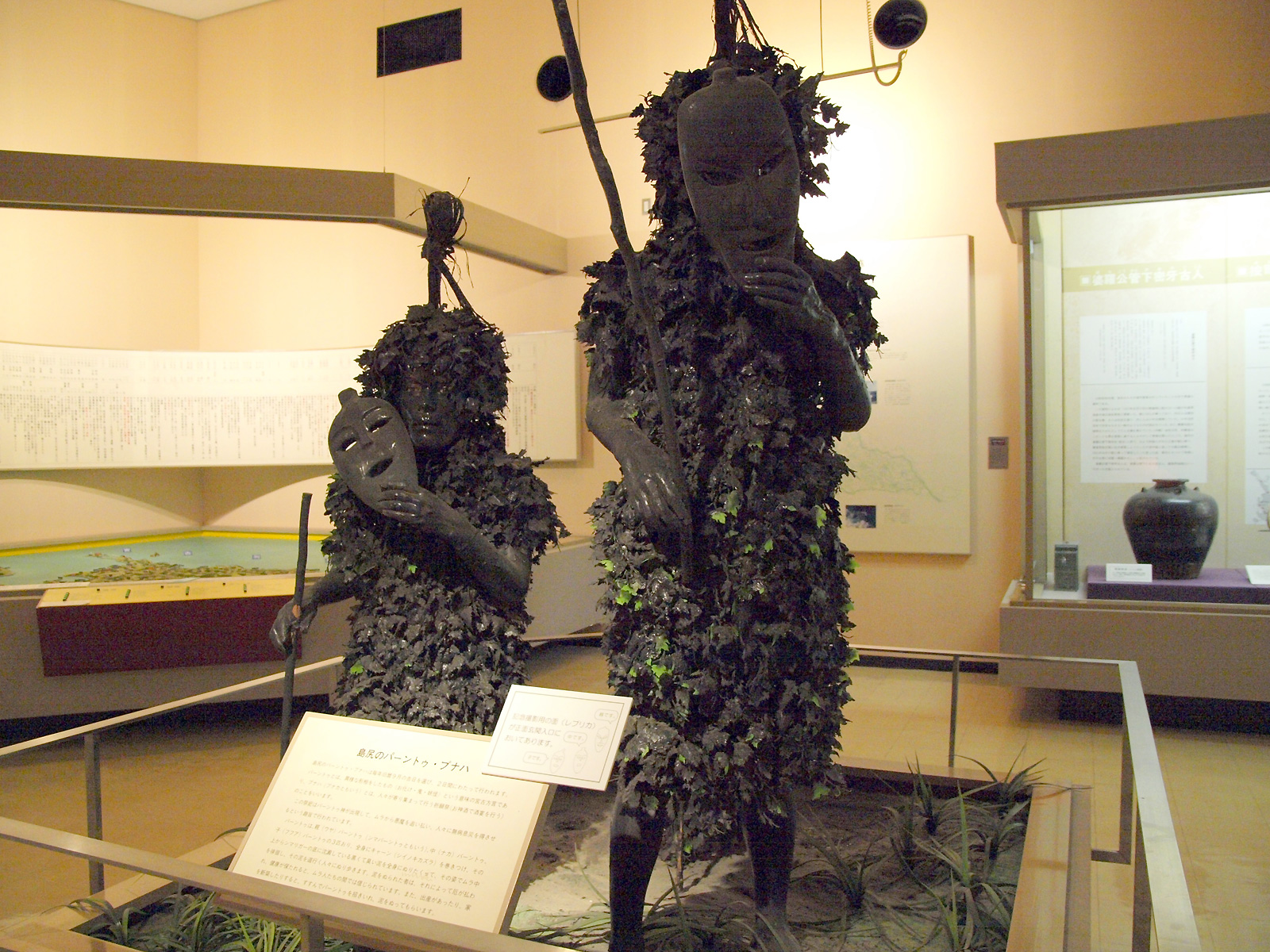
Exhibition of Paantu at Miyakojima City Museum, Miyakojima, Okinawa Prefecture, Japan

The Paantu (Miyako: パーントゥ) festival is an annual festival on the island of Miyako-jima in Japan's Okinawa Prefecture.

Every year during the ninth month of the lunisolar calendar, male villagers will dress up as paantu, supernatural beings meant to spread good luck and scare away evil spirits. The common feature is a wooden mask with a large forehead, small eyes, and a thin mouth, and the spreading of sacred mud onto newly built houses or onto newborn children's faces. In some villages, the Paantu are accompanied by traditional animist noro priestesses.

In other villages, the Paantu will chase after small children, making them cry, or chase after people who are avoiding having their faces smeared with the sacred mud.
