= 76th NHK Kōhaku Uta Gassen =

- 第76回NHK紅白歌合戦
- Genre: Music; variety; special
- Created by: Tsumoru Kondo
- Presented by: Haruka Ayase; Hiroiki Ariyoshi; Mio Imada; Naoko Suzuki
- Opening theme: 100th Anniversary Kōhaku Special Medley
- Ending theme: "Hotaru no Hikari"
- Composers: Takahiro Kaneko; Tsunaki Mihara; Ludwig van Beethoven (incidental music)
- Country of origin: Japan
- Original language: Japanese

Production
- Production locations: NHK Hall, Tokyo
- Camera setup: Multi-camera
- Running time: 260 minutes
- Production company: NHK Enterprise Inc.

Original release
- Network: NHK-G; NHK BSP4K; NHK BS8K; NHK World Premium (outside Japan); Jme (US and Canada only); NHK One; NHK Radio 1; NHK One Radiru Radiru
- Release: December 31, 2025

The 76th NHK Kōhaku Uta Gassen (Japanese: 第76回NHK紅白歌合戦, Hepburn: Dai Nanajūroku Kai Enu Eichi Kei Kōhaku Uta Gassen) was the 2025 (Reiwa 7) edition of NHK's annual New Year's Eve television special Kōhaku Uta Gassen, which took place at NHK Hall, Tokyo on December 31, 2025, and was broadcast live on NHK General TV, BSP4K, BS8K, and Radio 1.

With the theme "connecting, being connected, New Year's Eve", the event was hosted by comedian Hiroiki Ariyoshi, actresses Haruka Ayase and Mio Imada, and news anchor Naoko Suzuki. The White Team won this contest for the 42nd time across all categories as voted on by guest judges, audiences at NHK Hall, and NHK viewers. The event recorded the average viewership rating of 30.8% for the first half and 35.2% for the second half in the Kantō region.

== Overview ==
On September 17, 2025, NHK announced that the 76th edition of Kōhaku Uta Gassen would be held at NHK Hall, Shibuya, Tokyo, and broadcast through NHK General TV, BSP4K, BS8K, and Radio 1 in Japan on December 31, 2025 (Reiwa 7), starting at 19:20 (JST) and wrapping up at 23:45, with 5-minute break for the breaking news and announcement regarding TV licence fees dividing the first and second half between 20:55 and 21:00. The event is also available for simultaneous and on-demand streaming on NHK One and NHK One Radiru Radiru.

The show's hosts were revealed on October 14, being comedian Hiroiki Ariyoshi, actresses Haruka Ayase and Mio Imada, and NHK news anchor Naoko Suzuki, as well as its theme "connecting, being connected, New Year's Eve", (Note: Japanese: つなぐ、つながる、大みそか。, romanized: tsunagu, tsunagaru, ōmisoka) embodying the wish that "wonderful music will continue to connect us for the next 100 years." The event's key visual, designed by Kōta Hikichi, who served as creative director of Expo 2025, depicts a red-and-white circular motif and the hosts "energetically delivering music".

== Performances ==
On November 14, 2025, Kōhaku unveiled the show's original 39 participating artists, containing 20 on the Red Team, 17 on the White Team, and two in the special segment at the press conference at the NHK Broadcasting Center, Shibuya. The appearance of King & Prince made the return of artists under Starto Entertainment (a successor of Johnny & Associates) for the first time since 2022, following the two-year absence due to a consequence of the juvenile sex abuse scandal from Johnny Kitagawa.

The additional performers were announced later: AKB48, Radwimps, SixTones, Back Number, Gen Hoshino, Kōji Tamaki, Yumi Matsutoya, Kenshi Yonezu, Eikichi Yazawa, Koshi Inaba (as a featured artist for Masaharu Fukuyama), and Seiko Matsuda. List of songs they would perform was revealed on December 19, and the performance order on December 26, with Candy Tune opening the show, Mrs. Green Apple serving as original ōtori. Matsuda performed after the regular show as part of the special segment.

On December 18, the short drama Kōhaku Special Edition, based on the asadora Anpan (2025), and a special performance by the series' casts was announced. To commemorate the 100th anniversary of NHK, the opening show, featuring medley of songs that had performed throughout Kōhaku's history, was announced on December 24.

Key
Debuting artists
Returning artists
Special performances

List of performances
Order	Team	Artist	Song	Appearance
First half
Opening (Note: The title is "100th Anniversary Kōhaku Special Medley")		Mrs. Green Apple	"Yume de Aimashō"	—N/a
Opening		King & Prince; Hiromi Go; Hana	"Hyokkori Hyōtanjima"	—N/a
Opening		Aina the End; Mio Imada; Atsuko Maeda	"Haru Ichiban"	—N/a
Opening		Hiroiki Ariyoshi; Candy Tune; Fruits Zipper; Nobuteru Maeda	"Young Man (Y.M.C.A.)"	—N/a
Opening		Lilas Ikuta; Perfume	"Haru yo, Koi"	—N/a
Opening		Haruka Ayase; Sayuri Ishikawa; Fuyumi Sakamoto; Kiyoshi Hikawa; Misia	"Hana wa Saku"	—N/a
Opening		Illit &Team; Number_i; Be:First; Wakey	"Paprika"	—N/a
Opening		Kōhaku volunteer performers	"Ue o Muite Arukō"	—N/a
1	Red	Candy Tune	"Bai Bai Fight!"	1
2	Red	Fruits Zipper	"Watashi no Ichiban Kawaii Tokoro"	1
3	White	Leon Niihama	"Fun! Fun! Fun!"	2
4	White	Orange Range	"Ikenai Taiyō"	3
5	White	King & Prince	"What We Got (Kiseki wa Kimi to)"	6
6	Red	Illit	"Almond Chocolate"	2
7	Red	Yoshimi Tendo	"Anta no Hanamichi" (Myaku-Myaku Dance SP)	30
8	White	&Team	"Firework"	1
9	Red	Lisa	"Shine in the Cruel Night"	4
10	White	Milk	"E Jan"	1
11	Red	Nogizaka46 (Note: Members Hina Kawabata appeared only in the opening show due to a schedule conflict, and Reina Ozu was on hiatus at that time.)	"Same Numbers"	11
12	White	Junretsu	"Ii Yu da na (Vivinon Rock)"	8
13	White	Number_i	"God_i"	2 (Note: Members of Number_i have previously participated seven times as members of King & Prince.)
14	Red	Lilas Ikuta	"Koikaze"	1 (Note: Lilas Ikuta have previously participated three times as members of Yoasobi and once as Milet × Aimer × Lilas Ikuta × Vaundy.)
Special		Kiyoshi Hikawa	"Ai Sansan"	25
15	Red	Aespa (Note: Member Ningning withdrew from the show due to contracting influenza.)	"Whiplash"	1
16	Red	Aina the End	"On the Way"	1 (Note: Aina the End has previously participated once as a member of Bish.)
Special		Masaaki Sakai	"Saraba Koibito" "Bang Bang Bang" "Monkey Magic" "Punsukapin!"	7 (Note: Masaaki Sakai has previously participated six times as a soloist and once as a member of Sans Filtre.)
17	White	Be:First	"Muchū"	4
Special		Masaharu Fukuyama	"Mokusei" (featuring Koshi Inaba)	18
18	White	Hiroshi Miyama	"Sake Akari" (9th Road to Kendama World Records)	11
19	Red	Humbert Humbert	"Smiles and Stumbles"	1
20	Red	Fuyumi Sakamoto	"Yozakura Oshichi"	37
21	Red	Kaori Mizumori	"Õsaka Koi Shizuku" (Kōhaku Domino Challenge 2025)	23
22	White	Vaundy	"Tokimeki"	3
Second half
Special (Note: The title is "Television Drama Series Anpan Special Stage")		Mio Imada; Yuumi Kawai; Nanoka Hara	"Tokyo Boogie Woogie"	—N/a
Special		Takumi Kitamura; Fumiya Takahashi; Koichi Yamadera; Students	"Zuan-ka no Uta"	—N/a
Special		Motoki Ohmori	"Miagete Goran Yoru no Hoshi o"	—N/a
Special		Above performers Kenjiro Tsuda; Ryūsei Nakao; Keiko Toda	"Te no Hira o Taiyō ni"	—N/a
Special		Above performers Anpanman; Baikinman; Uncle Jam; Dokin-chan; Shokupanman; Currypanman	"Anpanman's March"	—N/a
23	White	Radwimps	"Tamamono" "Seikai"	3
24	Red	AKB48 (Note: Including AKB48's former members Atsuko Maeda, Minami Takahashi, Haruna Kojima, Tomomi Itano, Minami Minegishi, Yuko Oshima, Yuki Kashiwagi, and Rino Sashihara.)	"Flying Get" "Heavy Rotation" "Koi Suru Fortune Cookie" "Aitakatta"	13
25	White	Tube	"Season in the Sun" "Koi Shite Mūcho" "Ah Natsuyasumi"	3
26	Red	Hana	"Rose"	1
27	Red	Chanmina	"NG" "Sad Song"	1
28	Red	Hiromi Iwasaki	"Madonna-tachi no Lullaby"	15
Special		Gen Hoshino	"Create"	11
29	White	Sakanaction	"Kaijū" "Shin Takarajima"	3
Special		Eikichi Yazawa	"Shinjitsu" "Tomaranai Ha-Ha" "Travelling Bus"	3
30	White	SixTones	"Imitation Rain" "Barrier" "Kokkara"	4 (Note: SixTones have previously participated once as part of Johnny's Jr. Additionally, members Yugo Kochi and Hokuto Matsumura have previously participated once as part of NYC Boys, and Shintaro Morimoto once as part of Snow Prince Gasshōdan.)
31	White	Hiromi Go	"2 Oku 4 Senman no Hitomi (Exotic Japan)"	38
32	White	Back Number	"Want Want Want" "Suiheisei"	2
33	Red	Aimyon	"Belt of Venus"	7
34	White	Toshinobu Kubota	"1, 2, Play" "Missing" "La La La Love Song"	2
35	Red	Perfume	"Polyrhythm" "Meguloop"	17
36	Red	Mariko Takahashi	"Momoiro Toiki"	7 (Note: Takahashi has previously participated once as member of Pedro&Capricious.)
37	White	Akira Fuse	"My Way"	26
38	Red	Sayuri Ishikawa	"Amagi-goe"	48 (Note: Sayuri Ishikawa has previously participated once as a "special support guest" for the Red Team.)
Special		Yumi Matsutoya	"Ten made Todoke" "Kageriyuku Heya"	7
39	White	Kenshi Yonezu	"Iris Out"	3
40	White	Masaharu Fukuyama	"Kusunoki (Blowing in the Wind of 500 Years)"	18
Special		Kōji Tamaki	"Denen" "Fanfare"	4 (Note: Kōji Tamaki has previously participated twice as a member of Anzen Chitai.)
41	Red	Misia	"Everything" "Ai no Katachi"	10
42	White	Mrs. Green Apple	"Good Day"	3
Special		Seiko Matsuda	"Aoi Sangoshō (Blue Lagoon)"	25

== Voting ==
The winner of the 76th NHK Kōhaku Uta Gassen between White and Red Teams was determined by the 3-Point System, in which each point comes from guest judges, audiences at NHK Hall, and NHK television viewers. Guest judges and audiences in the hall can vote once, while television viewers can vote five times via remote control by pressing the red button for the Red Team and the blue button for White Team. The White Team won the event for the 42nd time across all categories as voted on by guest judges, audiences at NHK Hall, and NHK viewers.

Guest judges

- Tokito Oda – professional wheelchair tennis player
- Akari Takaishi – actress
- Taiga Nakano – actor
- Masako Nozawa – voice actress
- Nanako Matsushima – actress
- Kazuyoshi Miura – professional footballer
- Kaho Miyake – literary critic

Results
Method	Votes		Points
Method	Red Team	White Team	Points
Guest judges	2	5	0–1
Audience judges	878	1520	0–1
Viewers judges	3,361,295	4,397,571	0–1
Winner	White		0–3

== Viewership ==
Average TV viewership ratings in the Kantō region
Part	Average audience share	
Part	Household	Overall (including time-shift)
1	30.8%	33.1%
2	35.2%	37.3%

Average TV viewership ratings by performer
No.	Performers	Average audience share
1	Seiko Matsuda	39.9%
2	Mrs. Green Apple	39.4%
3	AKB48	37.1%
4	Misia	36.7%
5	Tube	36.4%
6	Hiromi Iwasaki	36.3%
7	Eikichi Yazawa	36.0%
7	Kenshi Yonezu	36.0%
9	Kōji Tamaki	35.7%
9	Masaharu Fukuyama	35.7%
