= The Actor =

The Actor may refer to:

- The Actor (painting) (L'acteur), a 1904 work by Pablo Picasso from his "Pink Period"
- "The Actor" (Flight of the Conchords), a 2007 episode of Flight of the Conchords
- "The Actor" (The Moody Blues song), 1968
- "The Actor" (Michael Learns to Rock song), 1991
- The Actor (1990 film), a 1990 documentary film by John Paskievich
- The Actor, a 1993 film by Ahmad Pejman
- The Actor (2025 film), a 2025 film by Duke Johnson
- Actor

== See also ==
- Actor (disambiguation)
