= Miyako Island =

Island within the Ryukyu Islands of Japan

Native name: Myāku
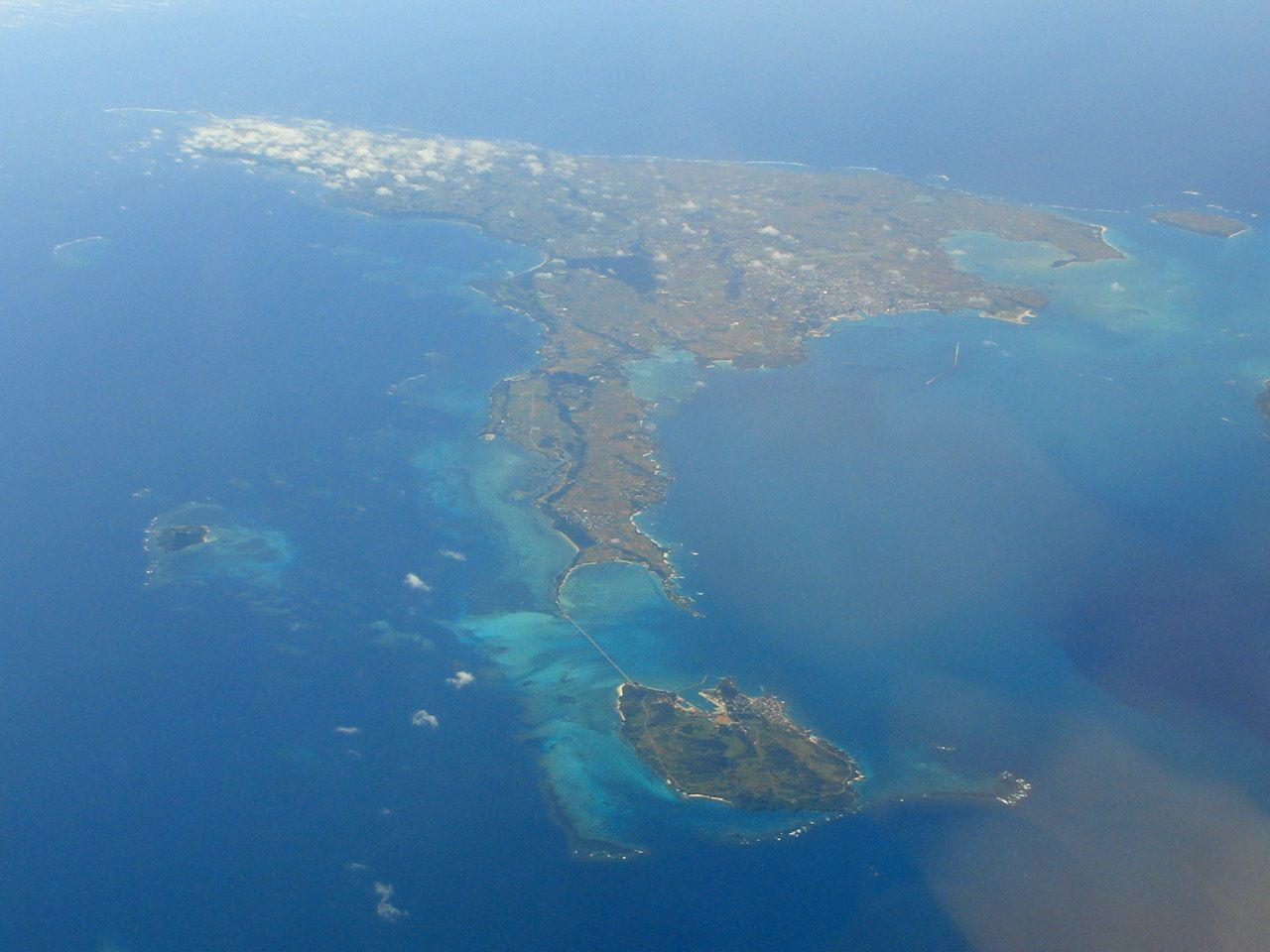
- Aerial view of Miyako Island from northwest

- Location of Miyako within Okinawa Prefecture Location of Miyako within Japan Location of Miyako Islands within the East China Sea

Geography
- Location: Okinawa Prefecture
- Coordinates: 24°46′N 125°19′E
- Archipelago: Miyako Islands
- Adjacent to: East China Sea
- Area: 158.87 km^{2} (61.34 sq mi)
- Highest elevation: 114.8 m (376.6 ft)
- Highest point: Nakao (ナカオ嶺)

Administration
- Japan
- Prefecture: Okinawa Prefecture

Demographics
- Population: 45,625 (2015 census)
- Pop. density: 275.4/km^{2} (713.3/sq mi)
- Ethnic groups: Ryukyuans, Japanese

Miyako Island (Japanese: 宮古島, Hepburn: Miyako-jima; Miyako: Myaaku (ミャーク); Okinawan: Naaku (ナーク)) is the largest and the most populous island among the Miyako Islands of Okinawa Prefecture, Japan. Miyako Island is administered as part of the City of Miyako Island, which includes not only Miyako Island, but also five other islands.

== Geography ==
Miyako Island lies approximately 300 kilometres (186 mi) southwest of Okinawa Island. With an area of 158.70 square kilometres (61.27 mi^{2}), Miyako is the fourth-largest island in Okinawa Prefecture. The island is triangular in shape and is composed of limestone. Miyako Island is subject to drought and is frequently struck by typhoons.

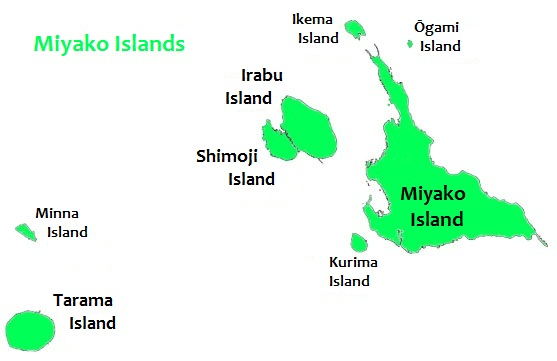
Miyako Island is the largest of the Miyako Islands

Miyako Island is well known for its beauty, particularly the Eastern Cape (東平安名岬, Higashi-hennazaki), a nationally designated Place of Scenic Beauty at the southeasternmost point of Miyako Island. It is considered by many as one of the most beautiful spots in Japan. Other notable locations include Yonaha Maehama beach, Sunayama beach, Painagama Beach and the sights on Irabu-jima. There are three islands nearby which are connected by bridges to Miyako Island, Irabujima (as of early 2015), Ikema Island (池間島, Ikema-jima), and Kurima Island (来間島, Kurima-jima).

Ikema Bridge connects Miyako Island and Ikema Island. It is 1,425 metres (4,675 ft)-long and was completed in February 1992. Yonaha Maehama beach can be viewed from the opposite side on Kurima Island. The Miyako language is one of several Ryukyuan languages and is spoken there to some degree.

=== Climate ===
Miyako Island has a tropical rainforest climate (Af according to the Köppen climate classification), because all twelve months have a mean temperature of at least 18 °C (64 °F).

Climate data for Miyakojima (1991–2020 normals, extremes 1937–present)
Month	Jan	Feb	Mar	Apr	May	Jun	Jul	Aug	Sep	Oct	Nov	Dec	Year
Record high °C (°F)	27.0 (80.6)	27.6 (81.7)	28.6 (83.5)	30.7 (87.3)	33.3 (91.9)	35.1 (95.2)	35.3 (95.5)	34.2 (93.6)	34.2 (93.6)	33.1 (91.6)	30.9 (87.6)	28.8 (83.8)	35.3 (95.5)
Mean maximum °C (°F)	25.1 (77.2)	25.7 (78.3)	26.9 (80.4)	28.7 (83.7)	30.7 (87.3)	32.3 (90.1)	33.2 (91.8)	33.0 (91.4)	32.1 (89.8)	30.3 (86.5)	28.6 (83.5)	26.4 (79.5)	33.4 (92.1)
Mean daily maximum °C (°F)	20.6 (69.1)	21.1 (70.0)	22.8 (73.0)	25.1 (77.2)	27.7 (81.9)	30.3 (86.5)	31.7 (89.1)	31.3 (88.3)	30.1 (86.2)	27.8 (82.0)	25.3 (77.5)	22.2 (72.0)	26.4 (79.5)
Daily mean °C (°F)	18.3 (64.9)	18.6 (65.5)	20.1 (68.2)	22.5 (72.5)	25.0 (77.0)	27.7 (81.9)	28.9 (84.0)	28.6 (83.5)	27.6 (81.7)	25.5 (77.9)	23.1 (73.6)	20.0 (68.0)	23.8 (74.8)
Mean daily minimum °C (°F)	16.3 (61.3)	16.6 (61.9)	17.9 (64.2)	20.4 (68.7)	23.0 (73.4)	25.7 (78.3)	26.8 (80.2)	26.5 (79.7)	25.6 (78.1)	23.8 (74.8)	21.3 (70.3)	18.2 (64.8)	21.9 (71.4)
Mean minimum °C (°F)	11.9 (53.4)	12.5 (54.5)	13.5 (56.3)	16.0 (60.8)	19.4 (66.9)	22.4 (72.3)	24.3 (75.7)	24.3 (75.7)	23.2 (73.8)	21.1 (70.0)	17.7 (63.9)	13.7 (56.7)	11.1 (52.0)
Record low °C (°F)	6.9 (44.4)	7.3 (45.1)	8.6 (47.5)	11.4 (52.5)	15.2 (59.4)	17.4 (63.3)	21.4 (70.5)	21.2 (70.2)	19.7 (67.5)	17.2 (63.0)	12.9 (55.2)	9.6 (49.3)	6.9 (44.4)
Average precipitation mm (inches)	138.8 (5.46)	119.8 (4.72)	138.7 (5.46)	148.7 (5.85)	222.3 (8.75)	194.7 (7.67)	151.6 (5.97)	257.4 (10.13)	259.3 (10.21)	157.9 (6.22)	139.8 (5.50)	147.2 (5.80)	2,076 (81.73)
Average snowfall cm (inches)	0 (0)	0 (0)	0 (0)	0 (0)	0 (0)	0 (0)	0 (0)	0 (0)	0 (0)	0 (0)	0 (0)	0 (0)	0 (0)
Average precipitation days (≥ 0.5 mm)	14.3	12.0	12.4	11.3	11.7	11.0	10.6	14.0	13.2	11.2	12.5	13.9	148.2
Average relative humidity (%)	72	74	76	79	82	84	80	81	79	75	74	71	77
Mean monthly sunshine hours	85.5	90.3	116.0	122.9	149.3	191.9	241.0	210.9	179.3	151.9	112.3	92.7	1,743.9
Source: Japan Meteorological Agency

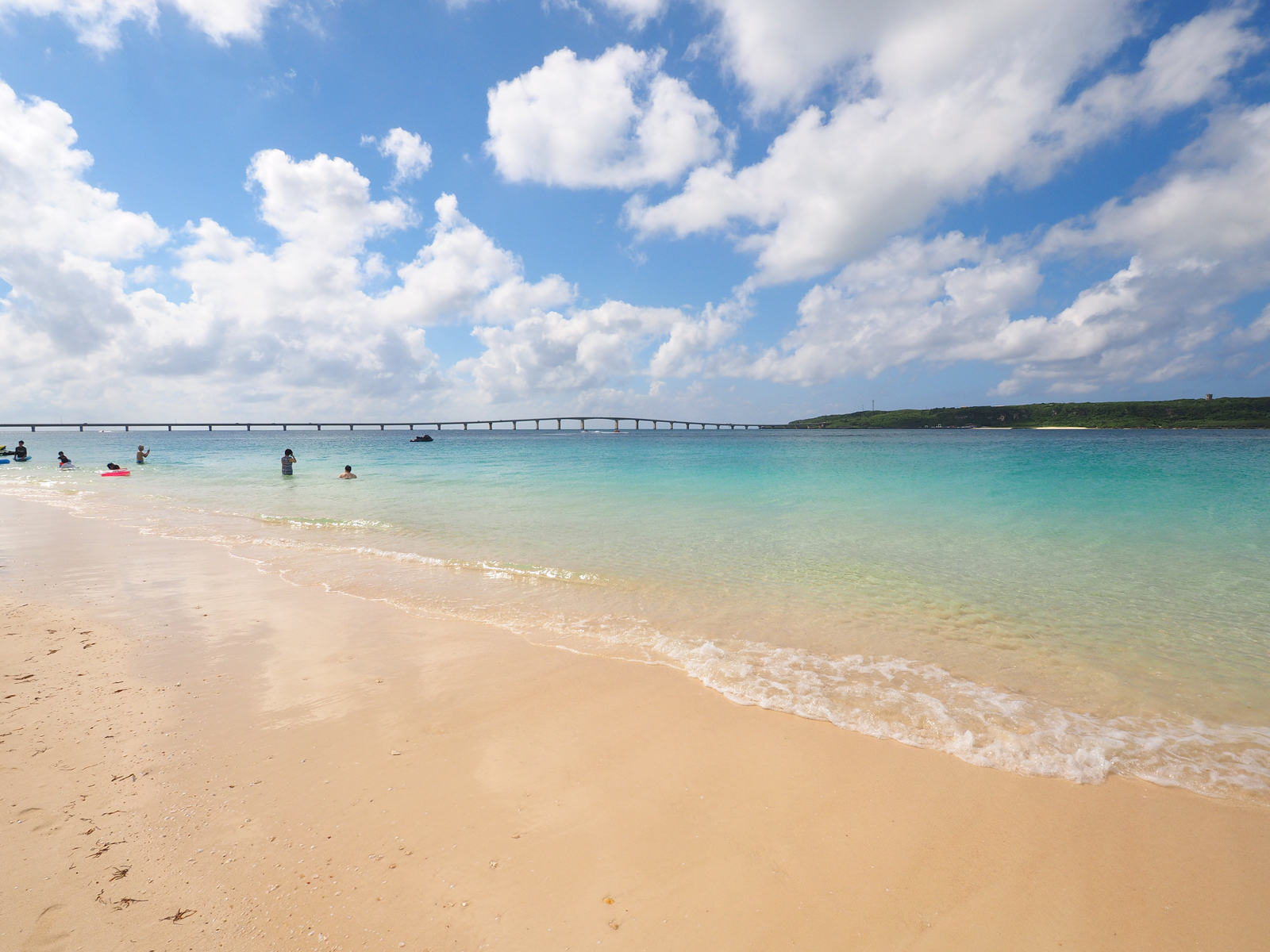
Yonaha Maehama beach.

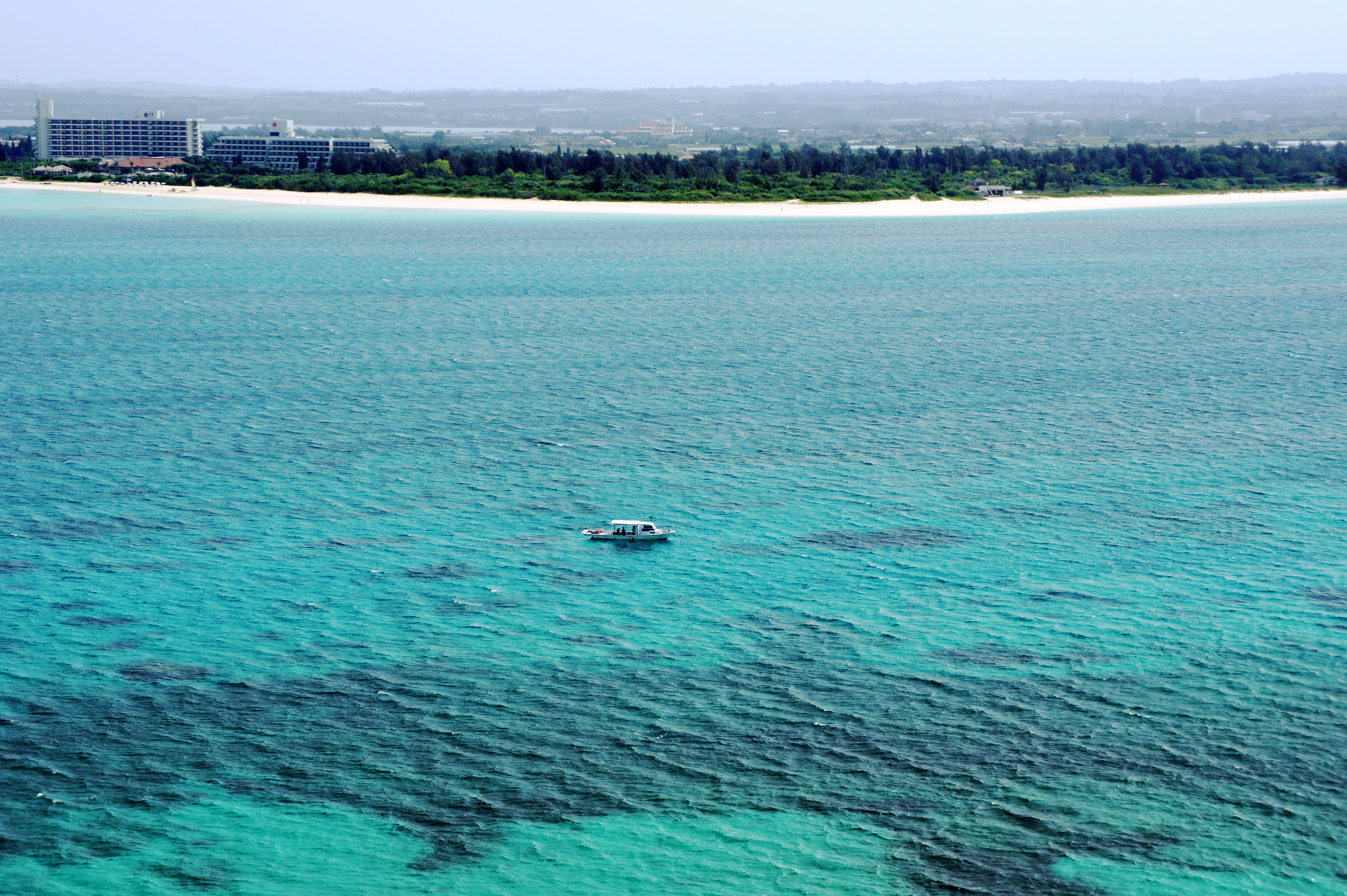
Yonaha Maehama Beach view from Kurima Island.

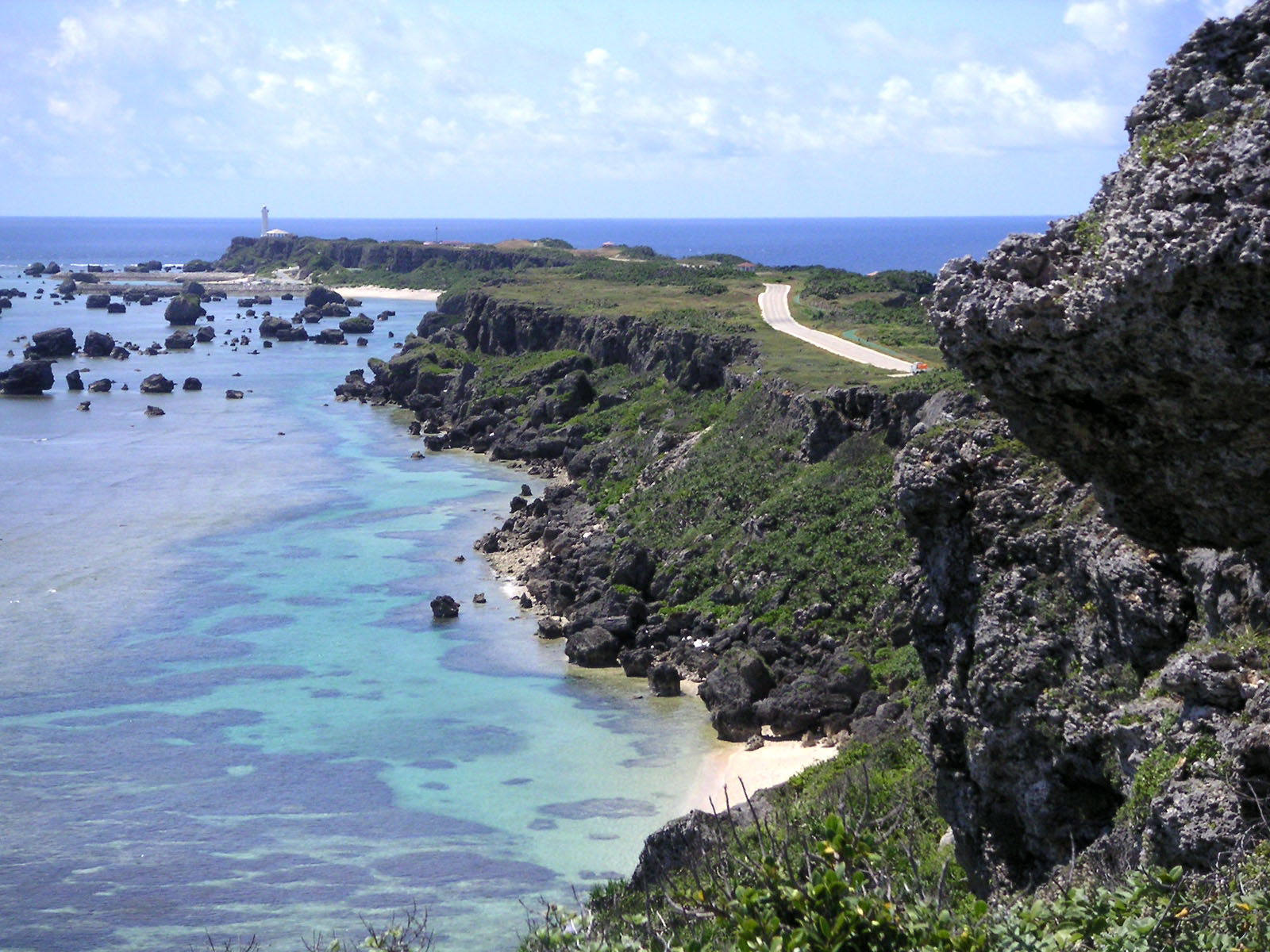
Eastern Cape (Higashi-hennazaki).

== Culture ==
On Miyako Island, Miruku-potoke (Maitreya) is traditionally believed to be an ugly god who arrived from China to create humans, animals, and crops. The handsome god Saku-potoke (the Buddha) then challenges him to a flower contest and steals the flower while the other sleeps. Miruku-potoke is thus defeated and forced to return to China, which is why China is a prosperous country while Miyako is not. Nearly identical creation myths are found in Korea.

Miyako hosts a unique festival, Paantu (パーントゥ), which occurs in the ninth month of the cultural (lunar) calendar. Three men dressed in grass, leaves and mud walk around town smearing mud on houses, cars and people. They carry sticks in one hand and an expressionless mask in the other. Legend holds that those who have been muddied by the Pantu will have a year of protection and good fortune. Owners of new homes will also invite Pantu to give a muddy 'blessing' to their homes.

Miyako has its own version of soba. Otōri is a custom of drinking awamori, a distilled beverage native to Okinawa, Japan. It is performed by people sitting (usually around a table). One offers a toast, drinks from a small glass, and then offers some to each person at the table making a round, and usually going to the right. When the toaster makes their way back to their spot, the person who passed the otori before pours them another glass. They then announce "tsunagimasu" and drink their second glass. After a brief interval, it is then the turn of the next person to pass the otori, which continues until the celebration is ended.

== Economy ==
Miyako is home to sugarcane cultivation, and produces brown sugar. Miyako jōfu is a locally produced hand-woven textile made from ramie fiber. It was formerly known as Satsuma jōfu. The textile traces its production to the Tensho period, 1573–92.

A large tourism boom in Miyako, starting with locals and Taiwanese visitors in the early 2010s, has been steadily growing with the annual number of tourists reaching over 1 million in both 2018 and 2019. The city has been struggling to cope with cruise megaships from mainland China– currently, the central port in Hirara can only handle ships as large as 50,000 tons but port officials hope to service ships as large as 200,000 tons. The effects of this growing tourist industry may change the character of the island as its population is small and rural.

== Defense ==
The Miyako Strait has strategic significance. Chinese warships' passage through the straits is monitored by Japanese forces.

In late April 2015, it was confirmed that the Japanese Ministry of Defense was in advanced planning regarding the permanent deployment of a GSDF security unit to Miyako Island, to begin sometime in fiscal year 2016. This is part of ongoing efforts to improve the defenses of the Nansei Islands. A GSDF security unit is a battalion sized force, of up to 500 personnel, whose role on Miyako Island will include providing the initial response to large-scale disasters in the area as well as acting as a rapid response force to counterattacks on remote islands within its area of responsibility.

The Miyako Island security unit's exact composition is unclear as of April 2015, though given its known taskings, it is likely that the TOE will include both the Komatsu LAV and soft skinned vehicles with all terrain capability.

Consideration is also currently being given to deploying GSDF units equipped with anti-aircraft and anti-ship missiles to the island.

Tokyo has currently earmarked ¥21.2 billion yen ($205 million USD) in FY2021 to build new Japan Coast Guard patrol boats and helicopters for the region, with plans to assign 22 ships of over 1,000 tons in the region by 2024. Miyako Island's Coast Guard station is home to 9 Shimoji-class small patrol vessels and a Tokara-class medium patrol vessel.

Positioned in between the larger commercial ports of Ishigaki and Naha, Coast Guard facilities on Miyako's neighbor islands can provide 3 Tsugarus, a Kunigami, and a Hateruma class patrol vessel based at the 11th Regional Coast Guard Headquarters in Naha and 11 Kunigami-class patrol vessels and 2 Hateruma-class patrol vessels homeported at Ishigaki should the need arise. Along with facilities for housing up to 600 crew, Ishigaki is now JCG's largest base, surpassing even that of Yokohama.

== Points of interest ==
- Miyakojima City Tropical Plant Garden
- Japan Airlines maintains a ticketing office on Miyako Island. It is only for domestic flights.
- Miyakojima 100 km (62 mi) Ultramarathon.
- Higashi-hennazaki Eastern Cape of Miyako Island

=== Transportation ===
==== Airlines ====
- Miyako Airport

==== Lanes ====
- Port of Hirara
- Port of Shimairi – For Ōgami-jima

==== Buses ====
- Miyako Kyoei Bus
- Yachiyo Bus
- Kyowa Bus
- Chuo Kotsu – For Shimojijima Airport in Shimoji-jima

==== Trains ====
- The only railway on this island is operated in Shigira Resort, and conformed as a Chairlift, which connects the westernmost with the southernmost points of railway in Japan.
  - Stations : Shigira-ue – the westernmost railway station in Japan. Shigira-shita – the southernmost railway station in Japan.

== See also ==
- Paantu
- Miyako Airport
- MIM-104F (PAC-3)
- Type 3 Chū-SAM
