= Hyakka Ryōran (song) =

Single by Lilas Ikuta

from the album Laugh
- Language: Japanese
- English title: "In Bloom"
- B-side: "Dreamer"
- Released: January 10, 2025
- Genre: Pop
- Length: 2:59
- Label: Echoes; Sony Japan
- Songwriter: Lilas Ikuta
- Producer: KOHD

Lilas Ikuta singles chronology
| "Shinsekai yori" (2024) | "Hyakka Ryōran" (2025) | "Dreamer" (2025) |

Music video
- "Hyakka Ryōran" on YouTube

"Hyakka Ryōran" (Japanese: 百花繚乱; lit. 'various flowers blooming together'), alternatively titled "In Bloom" in English, is a song by Japanese singer-songwriter Lilas Ikuta, taken from her second studio album, Laugh (2025). It was released as a single through Echoes and Sony Music Entertainment Japan on January 10, 2025. Written by Ikuta, the song served as an opening theme for the second season of the anime series The Apothecary Diaries. Commercially, "Hyakka Ryōran" peaked at number 11 on the Oricon Singles Chart and number 25 on the Billboard Japan Hot 100.

== Background and release ==
On December 10, 2024, it was announced that the opening theme for the second season of anime series The Apothecary Diaries, to premiere on January 10, 2025, would be "Hyakka Ryōran", performed by Lilas Ikuta. It is Ikuta's first solo work to accompany the television anime series. The snippet of the song was first teased in the anime's main trailer, uploaded on the same day. "Hyakka Ryōran" was released digitally on January 10, 2025, coincided with the anime's second-season premiere.

The CD single of "Hyakka Ryōran" was released later on March 10. It includes her self-cover of "Dreamer" as a B-side, originally written for the television drama series Ya Boy Kongming! (2023) and sung by Moka Kamishiraishi, who portrayed the character Eiko Tsukimi. It came in three editions: complete limited, first press limited, and standard. The medicine cabinet-packaged complete limited edition includes the original illustrations from The Apothecary Diaries on a digipack, and its Blu-ray features the anime's season two opening sequence without credits. The first press limited edition's Blu-ray includes the performance of Ikuta's first concert tour, Sketch, in Kanagawa, in July 2023. The English version, "In Bloom", translated by Konnie Aoki, was released on September 5, 2025. It was recorded at Metropolis Studios, London.

== Composition and production ==
A pop track, Ikuta solely wrote the lyrics and composed the music for "Hyakka Ryōran" and KOHD handles the song's arrangement. According to the press release, the song was created to "express the whimsical and charming side of the protagonist Maomao, the glittering and glamorous world of the inner palace, and the mystery that unfolds there." To write the song, Ikuta read all of The Apothecary Diaries light novel and manga, and watched its anime series before writing down similarities between herself and Maomao.

== Critical reception ==
Noboru Nagase from Rockin'On Japan praised the "fast BPM and dizzying arrangement giving a colorful and gorgeous impression," the lyrics that are "carefully written to follow the story but not get too involved," and "only the essential information" that is extracted. These make "this extremely pure pop song both overwhelmingly immediate and addictive. It's as if a thin layer is being peeled away with each work, toward the core of today's perfect form of pop."

== Promotion ==
An accompanying music video for "Hyakka Ryōran" premiered on March 7, 2025. It was directed by Mika Ninagawa and shot at Ninagawa's exhibition Ninagawa Mika with EIM: Lights of the Beyond, Shadows of This World at Kyoto Municipal Museum of Art, Kyoto. Ikuta debuted the live performance of the song at With Music on March 8, featuring footages from The Apothecary Diaries anime and music video on the background. The animated music video for the song's English version was released through Toho Animation Studio's YouTube channel on December 16.

== Accolades ==
Awards and nominations for "Hyakka Ryōran"
| Ceremony | Year | Award | Result | Ref. |
|---|---|---|---|---|
| AnimaniA Awards | 2026 | Best Anime Song | Nominated | |
| Crunchyroll Anime Awards | 2026 | Best Anime Song | Nominated | |
| Fan ga Atsui, Anime Manga Awards | 2025 | Best Theme Song | Won | |
| Japan Expo Awards | 2026 | Daruma for Best Opening | Nominated | |

== Track listing ==
- Digital download and streaming
1. "Hyakka Ryōran" (百花繚乱) – 2:59
- CD single
1. "Hyakka Ryōran" – 2:59
2. "Dreamer" – 4:06
3. "Hyakka Ryōran" (anime edit) – 1:29
4. "Hyakka Ryōran" (instrumental) – 2:59
5. "Dreamer" (instrumental) – 4:06
- Blu-ray (first press limited) – Sketch One Man Tour: Kanagawa Performance
1. "Sparkle" – 3:50
2. "Circle" – 3:09
3. "Omokage" – 3:32
4. "Kichijōji" – 2:57
5. "Midnight Talk" – 3:52
6. "Lens" – 4:02
7. "Tanpopo" – 3:18
8. "Senko Hanabi" – 3:28
9. "Hōseki" – 5:09
10. "Romance no Yakusoku" – 3:55
11. "Hikari" – 4:19
12. "Free Free Free" – 4:39
13. "Jump" – 5:03
14. "Answer" – 4:44
15. "P.S" (encore) – 2:49
- Blu-ray (complete limited)
1. "TV Anime The Apothecary Diaries Season 2 First Opening 'Hyakka Ryōran' Non-Credit Video" – 1:31
- Digital download and streaming – English version
1. "In Bloom" – 2:59

== Charts ==
=== Weekly charts ===
Weekly chart performance for "Hyakka Ryōran"
| Chart (2025) | Peak position |
|---|---|
| Japan (Oricon) | 11 |
| Japan Combined Singles (Oricon) | 19 |
| Japan Anime Singles (Oricon) | 5 |
| Japan Hot 100 (Billboard) | 25 |
| Japan Hot Animation (Billboard Japan) | 5 |

=== Monthly charts ===
Monthly chart performance for "Hyakka Ryōran"
| Chart (2025) | Position |
|---|---|
| Japan (Oricon) | 33 |
| Japan Anime Singles (Oricon) | 10 |

=== Year-end charts ===
Year-end chart performance for "Hyakka Ryōran"
| Chart (2025) | Position |
|---|---|
| Japan Digital Singles (Oricon) | 10 |
| Japan Hot 100 (Billboard) | 70 |
| Japan Hot Animation (Billboard Japan) | 16 |

== Certifications ==
Certifications for "Hyakka Ryōran"
| Region | Certification | Certified units/sales |
Streaming
| Japan (RIAJ) | Gold | 50,000,000^{†} |
^{†} Streaming-only figures based on certification alone.

== Release history ==
Release dates and formats for "Hyakka Ryōran"
| Region | Date | Format | Version | Label | Ref. |
|---|---|---|---|---|---|
| Various | January 10, 2025 | Digital download; streaming | One-track single | Echoes; Sony Japan | |
| Japan | March 10, 2025 | CD + Blu-ray | First press limited; complete limited | Echoes; Sony Japan | |
| Japan | March 10, 2025 | CD | Standard | Echoes; Sony Japan | |
| Various | September 5, 2025 | Digital download; streaming | English | Echoes; Sony Japan | |
