= Actress (disambiguation) =

Actress is a term used interchangeably with "actor" for a female performer in films, plays, radio and TV.

Actress may also refer to:

== Film ==
- The Actress (1928 film), a lost 1928 American silent drama film
- Actress (1943 film), a Soviet comedy film
- The Actress, a 1953 American comedy-drama film
- An Actress (1956), a Japanese film
- Actrius or Actresses, a 1997 Catalan-language film
- Actress (2007 film), a Russian comedy film
- Actresses (film), a 2009 South Korean mockumentary-style drama film by E J-yong
- Actress (2014 film), an American documentary film by Robert Greene

== Music ==
- Actress (band) or New York Dolls, an American hard rock band formed in New York City in 1971
  - Actress – "Birth of the New York Dolls" (1972)
- Actress (musician) or Darren J. Cunningham, British electronic musician

== Other uses ==
- Actress (Greenland), the highest peak of the Lemon Range in Eastern Greenland

== See also ==
- Actresses' Franchise League
- Actress in the House
- Best Actress
- Joyu (disambiguation)
- Lists of actresses
- Model/Actriz
