= Japanese torpedo boat Ōtori =

Two Japanese warships have borne the name Ōtori:

- Japanese torpedo boat Ōtori (1904), a Hayabusa-class torpedo boat launched in 1904 and stricken in 1923
- Japanese torpedo boat Ōtori (1935), an Ōtori-class torpedo boat launched in 1935 and sunk in 1944
