= Ōtori =

Otori (おおとり, Ōtori), also transliterated Ootori and Ohtori is a Japanese word meaning "large bird," "a key performer," or a Japanese name.

== Written forms ==
Ōtori can be written using different kanji characters and can mean:

- 大鳥, "large bird" or "big bird"
- 鴻, "Taiga bean goose" or "large bird" ("Oriental stork", "Whooper swan", etc...)
- 鳳, "Feng" (a male Fenghuang)
- 鳳凰, "Fenghuang" (Chinese phoenix)
- 大鳳, "Big Feng"
- 鵬, "Peng"
- 大鵬, "Big Peng" (Dapeng)
- 鷲, "Eagle"
- 大鷲, "Big Eagle" (Steller's sea eagle)
- 大取 ·大取り, "a key performer; last performer of the day"

The name can also be written in hiragana or katakana.

== Surname ==
- Ōtori Keisuke, a Japanese military commander
- Ran Ohtori, a member of Takarazuka Revue
- Yoshino Ohtori, a Japanese voice actor
- Ōtori Tanigorō, a sumo wrestler

== Fictional characters ==
- Akio Ohtori, Revolutionary Girl Utena
- Amane Ohtori, Strawberry Panic!
- Choutarou Ohtori, The Prince of Tennis
- Gen Ohtori, Ultraman Leo
- Kaede Otori, Komi Can't Communicate
- Keiichiro and Utako Ohtori, Happy!
- Kirino Ootori, Ai Kora
- Kohaku Ōtori or Unity-chan, mascot of Unity
- Kyoya Ootori, Ouran High School Host Club
- Naru Ootori, Oretachi ni Tsubasa wa Nai
- Reika Ootori, Digimon Tamers
- Tsubasa Ōtori, W Wish
- Madoka Ōtori, "Fushigi Yuugi"
- Raging Ōtori, "Uta no Prince-sama"
- Eiichi Ōtori, "Uta no Prince-sama"
- Eiji Ōtori, "Uta no Prince-sama"
- Takeo Otori, Tales of the Otori
- Emu Otori (鳳 えむ), character in Hatsune Miku: Colorful Stage!

== See also ==
- Ōtori taisha (Ōtori Grand Shrine), a Shinto shrine in Osaka, Japan.
- Ōtori-class torpedo boat, a class of fast torpedo boats of the Imperial Japanese Navy.
- Hō, an EP by Maximum the Hormone
- Ho (disambiguation)
- Taiho (disambiguation)
- Washi (disambiguation)
