= Taiho =

Taihō or Taiho can refer to:

- Taihō (era), a Japanese name for the years 701–704
- Taihō Code, a reorganization of the Japanese government at the end of the Asuka period
- Taiho Pharmaceutical
- Taihoku Prefecture, a former administrative district of Taiwan, created during Japanese rule in 1920
- Japanese aircraft carrier Taihō
- A title from the anime series The Twelve Kingdoms
- Taiho Shichauzo, a manga series alternatively titled You're Under Arrest
- Taihō Kōki (1940–2013), Japanese sumo wrestler
- Yasuaki Taiho, Taiwanese professional baseball player
