= Otōri =

Drinking custom in Miyako Island, Okinawa Prefecture, Japan

Otōri (オトーリ, 御通り, おとおり) is a drinking custom in Miyako Island, Okinawa Prefecture, Japan. The custom involves one person offering a toast to each of several other people in a round.

== Custom ==
This group ritual involves people sitting in a circle. One person, the oya (master of ceremonies), makes a speech related to the particular celebration or ceremony being observed, filling his own glass with alcohol, usually an Okinawan distilled beverage called awamori, and drains it. The oya then moves around the circle and pours awamori for everyone. After that he makes a short closing speech and chooses another oya to start the next round.

== History ==
Similar group rituals involving sake were once practiced across Japan. However, because the consumption of sake itself was limited to auspicious occasions, the popularization of otōri happened relatively recently. It is said that multi-turn ōtori started only after Okinawa Prefecture returned to Japan in 1972. Another popularized drinking ritual called Yoron kenpō can be found on Yoron Island, Kagoshima Prefecture.

The word otōri was used by Miyako's northern neighbor, Ryūkyū on Okinawa Island. As part of New Year's rituals, the king offered awamori to the royal family members, and the highest-ranking officials called sanshikan. The first record of otōri on Miyako Island was in the 14th century, when shōchū was shared by soldiers going to fight. In the 16th century, the same custom was recorded on Kurima Island.

In the 1980s, otōri became popular in Miyako Island, Okinawa Prefecture.

== Perspectives ==
Otōri is seen as a root cause of alcohol-related health problems in Miyako. In 2005, Miyako Health Authority started issuing ōtori cards, red cards (off liquor) and yellow cards (giving one's liver a rest), with which people were supposed to decline the offer more easily.

In 2020, Okinawa's prefectural government issued an advisory requesting that people refrain from the practice because of concerns relating to the spread of COVID-19.
