= Actor (Lilas Ikuta song) =

Single by Lilas Ikuta

from the album Laugh
- Language: Japanese
- English title: Actor
- B-side: "Dreamer"
- Released: October 11, 2025
- Genre: Pop
- Length: 3:49
- Label: Echoes: Sony Japan

Music video
- 幾田りら「Actor」Official Music Video on YouTube

"Actor" is a Japanese song by singer-songwriter Lilas Ikuta. It was written to serve as the ending theme for the third season of the TV anime Spy x Family. It was released on October 11, 2025.

== Background and release ==
Singer-songwriter Lilas Ikuta

In promoting the theme a cllaboration visual was made by Yuni Yoshida featuring Ikuta with the character of Anya. Other promotions were by manga author Tatsuya Endo and singer herself Ikuta.

Ikuta wrote the song "Actor" under the belief that everybody plays a role in the daily lives that as we go about our daily lives. She relates these feelings with the role Forger family play in Spy x Family develop in the anime as the grow gentle selves. The three Forger characters serve as the main focus of the song.
