= Joyeux =

Joyeux may refer to:

== People ==
- André Joyeux (born 1871), French artist and teacher
- Malik Joyeux (1980–2005), French Polynesian surfer
- Maurice Joyeux (1910–1991), French writer and anarchist
- Odette Joyeux (1914–2000), French actress, playwright and novelist

== Other uses ==
- Joyeux, Ain, commune in eastern France
- Joyeux Noël, 2005 French World War I film
