= Glass Apple/Sweet Memories =

Song by Seiko Matsuda

"Glass Apple / Sweet Memories"

Single by Seiko Matsuda

from the album Seiko Plaza
- Released: August 1, 1983
- Label: CBS/Sony
- Composers: Haruomi Hosono (#1); Masaaki Omura (#2)
- Lyricist: Takashi Matsumoto (#1, 2)
- Producer: Muneo Wakamatsu

"Glass Apple / Sweet Memories" is the 14th single by Seiko Matsuda, released on August 1, 1983. It was re-released as an 8cm CD in 1989, and again in 2004 as a fully limited 12cm CD with a paper jacket (using the pre-replacement artwork).

== Background ==
"Glass Apple" is said to have been produced with the strong intention by producer Muneo Wakamatsu and others to "win the Japan Record Awards". With top-tier creators—lyrics by Takashi Matsumoto, composition by Haruomi Hosono, and arrangement by Masaaki Omura—the song was strategically released in August to target award season. However, although it won a Gold Award, it failed to secure the Grand Prize. Reasons cited include the stark difference from Matsuda's previous musical style, sluggish sales until "Sweet Memories" gained attention, the overwhelming success of "Sweet Memories" overshadowing "Glass Apple," and divided promotional focus due to "Naniwa Koi Shigure" by Harumi Miyako from the same agency. After this song, Matsuda distanced herself from award competitions.

Meanwhile, it won the Golden Grand Prix at the 9th "All Japan Song Music Festival Chosen by You" (October 25, 1983). This marked her second major award following the previous year's FNS Music Festival Grand Prix for "Etude of Wild Roses." According to Oricon, it sold 857,000 copies, becoming her biggest hit of the 1980s and second-highest-selling single after "I Want to See You (Missing You) / Let's Run Toward Tomorrow."

== Production ==
=== Glass Apple ===
Composer Hosono was asked by the director to create a song like Simon & Garfunkel's "Bridge Over Troubled Water".

Lyricist Matsumoto said that together with songs he provided that year—"Secret Garden" and "Heaven's Kiss"—they shared "a kind of religious world, something supreme," adding that "things like gardens, heaven, apples… are both sexual and sacred."

Usually, Matsumoto and Hosono collaborated starting from lyrics, but Hosono suggested composing first to avoid monotony. However, the process stalled, and Matsumoto ended up quickly writing the lyrics on a sofa in the studio hallway.

Initially, choreography was included even in the intro and A-melody during TV performances, but it gradually disappeared.

The song won numerous awards, including the Gold Award at the 25th Japan Record Awards and Best Vocal Performance at the FNS Music Festival. It was also performed at the 34th Kōhaku Uta Gassen.

=== Sweet Memories ===
Arranger Masaaki Omura, who had worked extensively on Matsuda's songs, was chosen to compose a single for the first time.

Although highly regarded among fans from its release, it gained widespread attention after being used as a commercial song for Suntory Can beer, leading to its re-release as a double A-side in October of the same year. Despite originally being a B-side, it became extremely popular, frequently included in concerts and dinner shows, and widely covered by many artists.

Omura initially struggled after composing the chorus, but producer Wakamatsu joined him in the studio, and the song was completed in about an hour. Matsumoto commented that upon first hearing the demo, "it was completely jazz."

Recording took place on June 26, 1983, at Sony Shinanomachi Studio. Contributors included Hideki Matsutake (synthesizer), Kenji Takamizu (bass), Masaki Matsubara (guitar), Hidetoshi Yamada (keyboard and chorus), and the Kato JOE Group (strings).

The intro was created by Matsutake using a DX7 synthesizer, inspired by an image of "a chilly winter like reversed sound."

The first half of the second verse marked Matsuda's first English lyrics in her songs. She was reportedly surprised at the song's maturity.

The song has been released in many remixed and re-recorded versions.

In 1996, it was included in a high school music textbook published by Kyoiku Publishing.

It was performed at the 50th Kōhaku Uta Gassen in 1999.

In 2020, a new version was used in a McDonald's "Gohan Burger" commercial.

== Impact of commercial tie-in ==
The Suntory can beer commercial featuring "Sweet Memories" showed an animated penguin character (Papipupenguins) in a jazz bar where a female singer performs the song, moving customers to tears. Initially, the singer was uncredited, sparking curiosity about her identity. Due to the different vocal style, many did not recognize Matsuda—even her own mother reportedly did not realize it at first.

Later, her name was displayed, boosting sales. The song helped establish public recognition of her singing ability.

The single initially reached No.1 in its third week, then dropped out of the top 10, but climbed back up due to the popularity of the B-side through the commercial. After re-release as a double A-side, it regained No.1 after 11 weeks.

Ultimately, it spent 2 weeks at No.1 and over 10 weeks in the top 10, selling over 850,000 copies.

The commercial itself became highly popular, leading to a series and eventually the animated film Penguin's Memory: A Tale of Happiness. In 2010, Matsuda appeared in a Boss coffee commercial singing the song in live action.

== Track listing ==
All lyrics by Takashi Matsumoto

1. Glass Apple (3:56)
  Composition: Haruomi Hosono / Arrangement: Hosono & Masaaki Omura
2. Sweet Memories (4:37)
  Composition & Arrangement: Masaaki Omura
