= List of awards and nominations received by Yoasobi =

Yoasobi awards and nominations
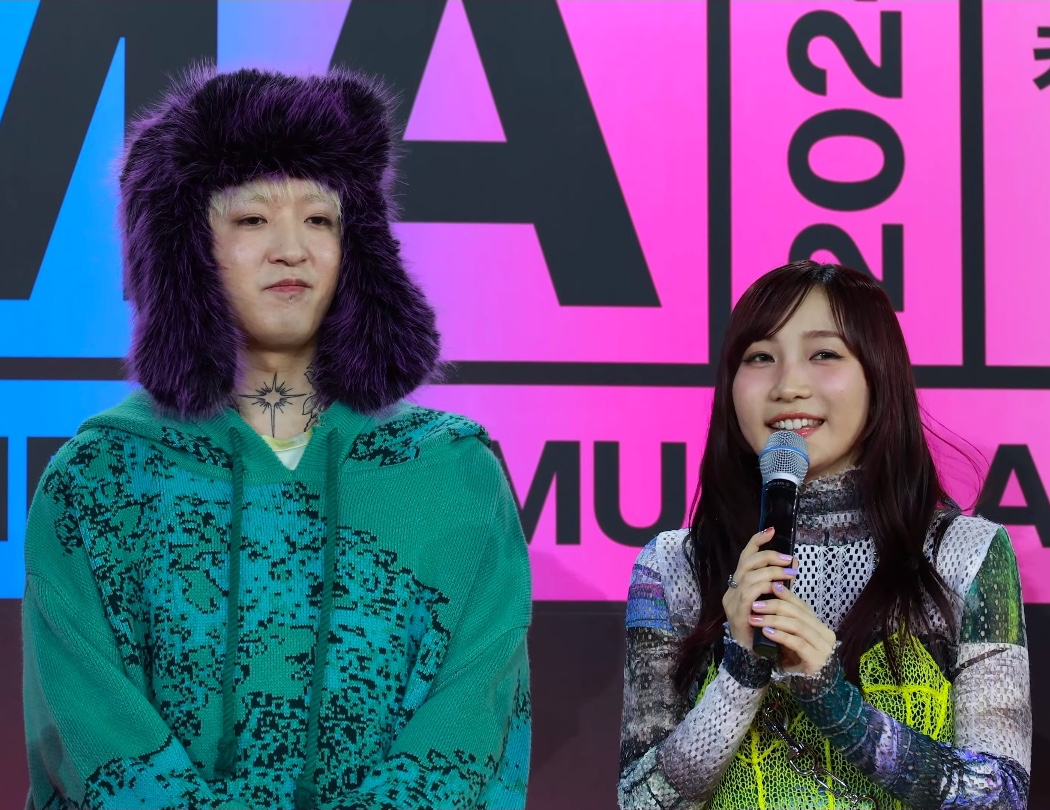
- Yoasobi at the 2024 Melon Music Awards
Awards and nominations
Award	Wins	Nominations
Abema Anime Trend Awards	1	1
AMD Award	1	1
Anan Award	1	1
AnimaniA Awards	0	3
Anime Grand Prix	0	4
Anime Trending Awards	1	5
Asian Pop Music Awards	0	1
CD Shop Awards	5	8
Crunchyroll Anime Awards	1	7
CX Awards	1	1
Dime Trend Award	1	1
Japan Anime Record Awards	1	1
Japan Expo Awards	1	2
Japan Gold Disc Award	10	10
Japan PR Awards	1	1
Japan Record Awards	2	2
JC / JK Buzzword Award	1	1
Line News Awards	1	1
Melon Music Awards	1	1
Music Awards Japan	3	14
MTV Video Music Awards Japan	4	5
Newtype Anime Awards	0	2
Noma Publishing Culture Awards	1	1
Pen Creator Awards	1	1
Reiwa Anisong Awards	3	6
Space Shower Music Awards	3	4
TikTok Trend Awards	1	1
Tokio Hot 100 Award	0	2
Tokyo Anime Award Festival	1	1
U-Can New Words and Buzzword Awards	0	1
Yahoo! Japan Search Awards	1	1

Totals (Note: Certain award groups do not simply award one winner. They acknowledge several different recipients, have runners-up, and have third place. Since this is a specific recognition and is different from losing an award, runner-up mentions are considered wins in this award tally. For simplification and to avoid errors, each award in this list has been presumed to have had a prior nomination.)
- Wins: 48
- Nominations: 84

Japanese duo Yoasobi has received numerous accolades, including ten Japan Gold Disc Awards, five CD Shop Awards, four MTV Video Music Awards Japan, three Music Awards Japan, three Reiwa Anisong Awards, three Space Shower Music Awards, two Japan Record Awards, one Noma Publishing Culture Award, one Crunchyroll Anime Award, and one Melon Music Award, among others.

Yoasobi's debut single "Yoru ni Kakeru" (2019) won Song of the Year at the 2020 MTV Video Music Awards Japan and the Space Shower Music Awards. It made the duo win Best 5 New Artist at the 35th Japan Gold Disc Award. In 2021, the duo received the Noma Publishing Culture Award from Kodansha in honor of excellent contributions to publishing, regardless of its form, as well as Artist of the Year at the MTV VMAJ and Space Shower Music Awards, and Special Achievement Award at the 63rd Japan Record Awards. In 2021, the themes for Beastars, "Kaibutsu" and "Yasashii Suisei", were nominated for Best Opening and Best Ending Sequences, respectively, at the 6th Crunchyroll Anime Awards. The former also won Song of the Year in both Japanese download and streaming categories at the 36th Japan Gold Disc Award.

Oshi no Ko first opening theme, Yoasobi's "Idol", won numerous awards, including Best Anime Song at the 8th Crunchyroll Anime Awards, Special International Music Award at the 65th Japan Record Awards, Best Animation Video and Song of the Year at the 2023 MTV Video Music Awards Japan, and was nominated alongside the anime series for the U-Can New Words and Buzzword Awards. In 2025, the duo had the third-most nominations in 14 categories at the inaugural Music Awards Japan, with 11 for "Idol". The duo won three awards for "Idol", including the main Global Hit from Japan. Furthermore, Yoasobi won Person of the Year at the 2023 Japan PR Awards and J-pop Favorite Artist at the 2024 Melon Music Awards.

== Awards and nominations ==
Name of the award ceremony, year presented, award category, nominee(s) of the award, and the result of the nomination
Award ceremony	Year	Category	Nominee(s)/work(s)	Result	Ref.
Abema Anime Trend Awards	2023	Anime Song Award	"Idol"	Won	
AMD Award	2020	Digital Contents of the Year	Yoasobi	Won	
Anan Award	2020	Trend Culture	Yoasobi	Won	
AnimaniA Awards	2024	Best Anime Song	"Idol"	Nominated	
AnimaniA Awards	2024	Best Anime Song	"Yūsha"	Nominated	
AnimaniA Awards	2026	Best Anime Song	"Watch Me!"	Nominated	
Anime Grand Prix	2023	Best Anime Song	"Shukufuku"	2nd place	
Anime Grand Prix	2024	Best Anime Song	"Idol"	2nd place	
Anime Grand Prix	2024	Best Anime Song	"Yūsha"	6th place	
Anime Grand Prix	2025	Best Anime Song	"Undead"	10th place	
Anime Trending Awards	2022	Ending Theme Song of the Year	"Yasashii Suisei"	Nominated	
Anime Trending Awards	2023	Opening Theme Song of the Year	"Shukufuku"	Nominated	
Anime Trending Awards	2024	Opening Theme Song of the Year	"Idol"	Won	
Anime Trending Awards	2025	Opening Theme Song of the Year	"Yūsha"	Nominated	
Anime Trending Awards	2026	Opening Theme Song of the Year	"Watch Me!"	Nominated	
Asian Pop Music Awards	2023	Best OST	"Yūsha"	Nominated	
CD Shop Awards	2022	Grand Prix (Red)	The Book	Nominated	
CD Shop Awards	2022	Finalist Award	The Book	Won	
CD Shop Awards	2022	Special Award	The Book	Won	
CD Shop Awards	2022	Grand Prix (Red)	The Book 2	Nominated	
CD Shop Awards	2022	Finalist Award	The Book 2	Won	
CD Shop Awards	2022	Special Award	The Book 2	Won	
CD Shop Awards	2024	Grand Prix (Red)	The Book 3	Nominated	
CD Shop Awards	2024	Finalist Award	The Book 3	Won	
Crunchyroll Anime Awards	2022	Best Opening Sequence	"Kaibutsu"	Nominated	
Crunchyroll Anime Awards	2022	Best Ending Sequence	"Yasashii Suisei"	Nominated	
Crunchyroll Anime Awards	2024	Best Anime Song	"Idol"	Won	
Crunchyroll Anime Awards	2024	Best Opening Sequence	"Idol"	Nominated	
Crunchyroll Anime Awards	2025	Best Anime Song	"Yūsha"	Nominated	
Crunchyroll Anime Awards	2026	Best Anime Song	"Watch Me!"	Nominated	
Crunchyroll Anime Awards	2026	Best Opening Sequence	"Watch Me!"	Nominated	
CX Award	2020	CX Award	Yoasobi	Won	
Dime Trend Award	2021	Best Character Award	Yoasobi	Won	
Japan Anime Record Awards	2023	Anime Song Award	"Idol"	Won	
Japan Expo Awards	2024	Daruma for Best Opening	"Idol"	Won	
Japan Expo Awards	2026	Daruma for Best Opening	"Watch Me!"	Nominated	
Japan Gold Disc Award	2021	Best 5 New Artist	Yoasobi	Won	
Japan Gold Disc Award	2022	Song of the Year by Download (Japan)	"Kaibutsu"	Won	
Japan Gold Disc Award	2022	Best 5 Songs by Download	"Kaibutsu"	Won	
Japan Gold Disc Award	2022	Song of the Year by Streaming (Japan)	"Kaibutsu"	Won	
Japan Gold Disc Award	2022	Best 5 Songs by Streaming	"Kaibutsu"	Won	
Japan Gold Disc Award	2022	Special Award	Yoasobi	Won	
Japan Gold Disc Award	2024	Song of the Year by Download (Japan)	"Idol"	Won	
Japan Gold Disc Award	2024	Best 3 Songs by Download	"Idol"	Won	
Japan Gold Disc Award	2024	Song of the Year by Streaming (Japan)	"Idol"	Won	
Japan Gold Disc Award	2024	Best 5 Songs by Streaming	"Idol"	Won	
Japan PR Awards	2023	Person of the Year	Yoasobi	Won	
Japan Record Awards	2021	Special Achievement Award	Yoasobi	Won	
Japan Record Awards	2023	Special International Music Award	Yoasobi	Won	
JC / JK Buzzword Award	2020	Best Person (first half year)	Yoasobi	Won	
Line News Awards	2023	Popular Award – Artist	Yoasobi	Won	
Melon Music Awards	2024	J-pop Favorite Artist	Yoasobi	Won	
Music Awards Japan	2025	Artist of the Year	Yoasobi	Nominated	
Music Awards Japan	2025	Best Japanese Song Artist	Yoasobi	Nominated	
Music Awards Japan	2025	Best Japanese Dance Pop Artist	Yoasobi	Nominated	
Music Awards Japan	2025	Song of the Year	"Idol"	Nominated	
Music Awards Japan	2025	Top Global Hit from Japan	"Idol"	Won	
Music Awards Japan	2025	Best Japanese Song	"Idol"	Nominated	
Music Awards Japan	2025	Best Japanese Dance Pop Song	"Idol"	Nominated	
Music Awards Japan	2025	Best Anime Song	"Idol"	Won	
Music Awards Japan	2025	Best Music Video	"Idol"	Won	
Music Awards Japan	2025	Best Viral Song	"Idol"	Nominated	
Music Awards Japan	2025	Best Japanese Song in Asia	"Idol"	Nominated	
Music Awards Japan	2025	Best Japanese Song in Europe	"Idol"	Nominated	
Music Awards Japan	2025	Best Japanese Song in Latin America	"Idol"	Nominated	
Music Awards Japan	2025	Best of Listeners' Choice: Japanese Song	"Idol"	Nominated	
MTV Video Music Awards Japan	2020	Song of the Year	"Yoru ni Kakeru"	Won	
MTV Video Music Awards Japan	2021	Artist of the Year	Yoasobi	Won	
MTV Video Music Awards Japan	2023	Video of the Year	"Idol"	Nominated	
MTV Video Music Awards Japan	2023	Best Animation Video	"Idol"	Won	
MTV Video Music Awards Japan	2023	Song of the Year	"Idol"	Won	
Newtype Anime Awards	2023	Best Theme Song	"Idol"	2nd place	
Newtype Anime Awards	2023	Best Theme Song	"Shukufuku"	3rd place	
Noma Publishing Culture Awards	2021	Noma Publishing Culture Award	Yoasobi	Won	
Pen Creator Awards	2023	Creator Award	Yoasobi	Won	
Reiwa Anisong Awards	2021	Best Work Award	"Kaibutsu"	Nominated	
Reiwa Anisong Awards	2021	Best Artist Song Award	"Kaibutsu"	Won	
Reiwa Anisong Awards	2022	Best Work Award	"Shukufuku"	Nominated	
Reiwa Anisong Awards	2023	Best Work Award	"Idol"	Won	
Reiwa Anisong Awards	2023	Best Anime Song Award	"Idol"	Won	
Reiwa Anisong Awards	2023	User Voting Award	"Idol"	4th place	
Space Shower Music Awards	2021	Song of the Year	"Yoru ni Kakeru"	Won	
Space Shower Music Awards	2021	Best Breakthrough Artist	Yoasobi	Nominated	
Space Shower Music Awards	2022	Best Pop Artist	Yoasobi	Won	
Space Shower Music Awards	2022	Artist of the Year	Yoasobi	Won	
TikTok Trend Awards	2023	Best Music	"Idol"	Won	
Tokio Hot 100 Award	2023	Best Performance – Japan	Yoasobi	Nominated	
Tokio Hot 100 Award	2023	Best Buzz	Yoasobi	Nominated	
Tokyo Anime Award Festival	2024	Best Music	Yoasobi	Won	
U-Can New Words and Buzzword Awards	2023	New Words and Buzzwords Awards	"Idol"; Oshi no Ko	Nominated	
Yahoo! Japan Search Awards	2023	Best Music	"Idol"	Won	
