= Tokyo Revengers =

Japanese manga series by Ken Wakui, and its franchise

- First tankōbon volume cover, featuring Takemichi Hanagaki

東京卍リベンジャーズ (Note: Stylized with a manji swastika symbol) (Tōkyō Ribenjāzu)
- Genre: Action; Science fiction thriller; Yankī
- Manga
- Written by: Ken Wakui
- Published by: Kodansha
- English publisher: NA: Kodansha USA (digital); Seven Seas Entertainment (print)
- Imprint: Shōnen Magazine Comics
- Magazine: Weekly Shōnen Magazine
- Original run: March 1, 2017 – November 16, 2022
- Volumes: 31
Further information
Anime television series
Directed by	Koichi Hatsumi (S1–3); Maki Kodaira (S4)
Written by	Yasuyuki Mutō; Koichi Hatsumi (S4)
Music by	Hiroaki Tsutsumi
Studio	Liden Films
Licensed by	Crunchyroll (S1); Disney Platform Distribution (S2–4); SA / SEA: Muse Communication (S1)
Original network	MBS, TV Tokyo, TVA, TVh, TVQ, BS Asahi, AT-X, TSK, QAB, RKK, ATV, UTY, RSK (S1–3); MBS, TBS, CBC TV, BS-TBS (Animeism) (S4)
English network	SEA: Animax Asia; US: Adult Swim (Toonami)
Original run	April 11, 2021 – present
Episodes	58
Original net animation
ChibiReve
Directed by	Minoru Ashina
Studio	Studio Puyukai
Released	April 12, 2021 – September 20, 2021
Episodes	24
Live-action film
Tokyo Revengers
Directed by	Tsutomu Hanabusa
Written by	Izumi Takahashi
Music by	Yutaka Yamada
Studio	Warner Bros. Pictures
Licensed by	Crunchyroll
Released	July 9, 2021
Runtime	120 minutes
Manga
Todai Revengers
Written by	Shinpei Funatsu
Published by	Kodansha
English publisher	NA: Seven Seas Entertainment
Magazine	Magazine Pocket
Original run	November 3, 2021 – March 29, 2023
Volumes	6
Manga
Tokyo Revengers: A Letter from Keisuke Baji
Written by	Yukinori Kawaguchi
Published by	Kodansha
English publisher	NA: Seven Seas Entertainment
Magazine	Magazine Pocket
Original run	July 27, 2022 – March 10, 2025
Volumes	6
Live-action film
Tokyo Revengers 2: Bloody Halloween – Destiny
Directed by	Tsutomu Hanabusa
Written by	Izumi Takahashi
Music by	Yutaka Yamada
Studio	Warner Bros. Pictures
Released	April 21, 2023
Runtime	90 minutes
Live-action film
Tokyo Revengers 2: Bloody Halloween – Decisive Battle
Directed by	Tsutomu Hanabusa
Written by	Izumi Takahashi
Music by	Yutaka Yamada
Studio	Warner Bros. Pictures
Released	June 30, 2023
Runtime	96 minutes
Video games
Tokyo Revengers Puzz Reve! (2022); Tokyo Revengers: Last Mission (2024)
- icon

Tokyo Revengers (Japanese: 東京卍リベンジャーズ, Hepburn: Tōkyō Ribenjāzu) is a Japanese manga series written and illustrated by Ken Wakui. It was serialized in Kodansha's shōnen manga magazine Weekly Shōnen Magazine from March 2017 to November 2022, with its chapters collected in 31 tankōbon volumes.

The story follows Takemichi Hanagaki, a 26-year-old part-timer with a gloomy life, who learns that his ex-girlfriend, Hinata Tachibana, has died in a dispute involving the Tokyo Manji Gang. The next day, while returning from his part-time job, Takemichi gets pushed off the subway platform by someone. As he is about to be hit, he jumps twelve years back in time, to the year he was dating Hinata. Discovering this, he makes the decision to do everything to prevent her death.

An anime television series adaptation produced by Liden Films, aired from April to September 2021. A second season aired from January to April 2023. A third season aired from October to December 2023. A fourth season premiered in October 2026. A live-action film adaptation was released in Japan in July 2021, with its two-part sequel released in April and June 2023.

By June 2024, the manga had over 80 million copies in circulation, making it one of the best-selling manga series of all time. In 2020, Tokyo Revengers won the 44th Kodansha Manga Award for the shōnen category.

== Plot ==
In 2017, Takemichi Hanagaki, a 26-year-old freeter, discovers that his former girlfriend, Hinata Tachibana, and her younger brother Naoto have been murdered by the Tokyo Manji Gang. The following day, as he returns from work, an unknown assailant pushes him onto a train platform. Facing imminent death, he is suddenly transported twelve years into the past, to 2005, during his middle school years.

In the past, Takemichi finds his friends coerced into underground fights orchestrated by Kiyomasa, a member of the Tokyo Manji Gang. His growing friendship with Mikey alters the present, preventing Akkun, one of his friends, from being imprisoned—though Akkun later takes his own life out of fear. Realizing the gang poses a greater threat than he anticipated, Takemichi witnesses the Tokyo Manji Gang declare war on the rival Moebius group to avenge Pah-chin's friend. He also learns that Draken, Mikey's second-in-command, will be killed, leading to Mikey's descent into brutality. Though Takemichi reconciles their conflict, the gang is ambushed by Moebius, led by Shūji Hanma of Valhalla. The attack is revealed to be a betrayal by Peh-yan, angered over Pah-chin's arrest, while Kiyomasa stabs Draken for humiliating him. The Tokyo Manji Gang emerges victorious, Draken survives, and Takemichi defeats Kiyomasa.

Returning to the present, Takemichi finds Hinata and his friends still dead, with Tetta Kisaki having transformed the gang into a violent syndicate. Back in 2005, Kisaki exploits Pah-chin's absence to become a division captain. Mikey promises to expel Kisaki if Takemichi retrieves Baji, who had faked his defection to investigate Kisaki. Takemichi joins the gang under Takashi Mitsuya and uncovers Mikey's unresolved hatred for Kazutora, who killed Mikey's brother, Shinichiro, years prior. He also learns Kisaki formed Valhalla intending for Mikey to lead it, with the Tokyo Manji Gang eventually merging into Valhalla after a decisive battle on October 31, 2005—Bloody Halloween. Though the gang wins, Baji dies, but Takemichi prevents Mikey from killing Kazutora, who surrenders to the police.

Yet again, the present reveals the Tokyo Manji Gang has expanded into a criminal empire by absorbing the Black Dragons, and Takemichi's friends remain doomed. Returning to the past, he intervenes in Hakkai Shiba's forced recruitment into the Black Dragons by his abusive brother, Taiju. With Mitsuya's negotiation, Yuzuha is freed from Taiju's control, and Takemichi helps Hakkai defy him. Mikey and Draken's intervention secures victory, disbanding the Black Dragons. Koko and Inupi, now co-leaders of the gang's 11th generation, join the Tokyo Manji Gang under Takemichi.

In the present, the Tokyo Manji Gang has been absorbed by Tenjiku after the Kanto Incident, leaving Mikey broken and responsible for his friends' deaths. Back in the past, Takemichi and Naoto investigate Tenjiku, discovering Kisaki's involvement and Shinichiro's role as the Black Dragons' founder. Ambushed by Tenjiku, they narrowly escape death through another time leap. Takemichi learns that Tenjiku's leader, Izana Kurokawa, resents Mikey due to jealousy over Shinichiro's legacy. In the final confrontation, Mikey and Draken arrive after Hinata reveals Takemichi's time-traveling efforts. Kisaki confesses his motives were personal ambition and an obsession with Hinata.

The present now shows Takemichi's friends alive and thriving, but Mikey has vanished, forming the ruthless Bonten gang. Unable to time-leap through Naoto, Takemichi saves Mikey from suicide, transporting himself to 2008. Here, he navigates a power struggle between Rokuhara Tandai, Brahman, and Mikey's Kanto Manji Gang. After preventing Senju's death, Draken is killed shielding them. The Kanto Manji Gang prevails, absorbing Rokuhara Tandai, while Senju disbands Brahman to spare Takemichi from Mikey's wrath. In their final confrontation, Mikey reveals that Shinichiro had originally died, but a homeless man's stolen time-leap ability allowed him to alter events. In the present, Takemichi goads Mikey into a violent clash, enduring his attacks before being mortally wounded. As he dies, his cries snap Mikey back to sanity, and they time-leap together to 1998.

Reuniting in the past, they vow to rewrite history. Together, they reform the Tokyo Manji Gang, prevent Shinichiro's death, and save Baji, Draken, Emma, and Izana. Kisaki is befriended, and the Shiba siblings' conflict is resolved. By 2008, Mikey disbands the gang, ensuring a peaceful future. Eleven years later, Takemichi and Hinata marry, surrounded by their friends and family.

== Media ==
=== Manga ===
Written and illustrated by Ken Wakui, Tokyo Revengers was serialized in Kodansha's shōnen manga magazine Weekly Shōnen Magazine from March 1, 2017, to November 16, 2022. Kodansha collected its 278 individual chapters in 31 tankōbon volumes, released from May 17, 2017, to January 17, 2023.

In North America, Kodansha USA started the digital release of the manga in 2018. Seven Seas Entertainment started releasing the manga in a print omnibus edition in 2022.

==== Spin-offs ====
A parody spin-off manga by Shinpei Funatsu, titled Tōdai Revengers (東大リベンジャーズ, Tōdai Ribenjāzu), was published on Kodansha's Magazine Pocket digital platform from November 3, 2021, to March 29, 2023. Kodansha collected its chapters in six tankōbon volumes, released from February 17, 2022, to May 17, 2023. Seven Seas Entertainment has also licensed this spin-off in North America.

Another spin-off manga series by Yukinori Kawaguchi, centered around Keisuke Baji and Chifuyu Matsuno, titled Tokyo Revengers: A Letter from Keisuke Baji (東京卍リベンジャーズ ～場地圭介からの手紙～, Tōkyō Ribenjāzu Baji Keisuke kara no Tegami), was published on Magazine Pocket from July 27, 2022, to March 10, 2025. Kodansha collected its chapters in six tankōbon volumes, released from November 17, 2022, to May 16, 2025. Kodansha publishes the spin-off in English on its K Manga service. Seven Seas Entertainment has also licensed the spin-off in North America.

=== Anime ===
In June 2020, an anime television series adaptation was announced. The series is produced by Liden Films and directed by Koichi Hatsumi. The series composition is handled by Yasuyuki Mutō, with character designs by Keiko Ōta, sound direction by Satoki Iida, and music composed by Hiroaki Tsutsumi. It aired on MBS and other networks from April 11 to September 19, 2021. (Note: MBS listed the series premiere on April 10 at 26:20 (effectively April 11 at 2:20 a.m. JST). The following episodes were listed as airing on Saturday at 26:08 (effectively Sunday at 2:08 a.m.).) Official Hige Dandism performed the opening theme song, "Cry Baby", while Eill performed the ending theme song "Koko de Iki o Shite" (ここで息をして; lit. 'Take a Breath Here'). The second ending song is "Tokyo Wonder", performed by Nakimushi.

A series of anime shorts produced by Studio Puyukai featuring chibi versions of the characters, titled ChibiReve (ちびりべ) lit. 'Chibi Revengers', was released on YouTube from April 12 to September 20, 2021.

In December 2021, a second season, adapting the "Christmas Showdown" arc, was announced. It aired from January 8 to April 2, 2023. (Note: MBS listed the series premiere on January 7 at 26:08 (effectively January 8 at 2:08 a.m. JST).) Official Hige Dandism performed the opening theme song "White Noise" (ホワイトノイズ, Howaito Noizu), while Tuyu performed the ending theme song "Kizutsukedo, Aishiteru" (傷つけど、愛してる。; lit. 'It might be painful, but I still love it').

In April 2023, a third season, adapting the "Tenjiku" arc, was announced. It aired for 12 episodes from October 4 to December 27, 2023. (Note: MBS listed the series premiere on October 3 at 24:00 (effectively October 4 at midnight).) The opening theme song is Official Hige Dandism's "White Noise", while Hey-Smith performed the ending theme song "Say My Name".

In June 2024, it was announced that the anime series would have a fourth season. A mini series, titled Dōwa Revengers (童話リベンジャーズ; lit. 'Fairy Tale Revengers'), was also announced, consisting of a Tokyo Revengers version of various fairy tales. Titled Tokyo Revengers: War of the Three Titans Arc (東京リベンジャーズ 三天戦争編, Tōkyō Ribenjāzu: Santen Sensō-hen), the season is produced by Liden Films and directed by Maki Kodaira, replacing Hatsumi from the previous seasons who handled series composition with Mutō. It premiered on October 3, 2026, on the Animeism programming block on MBS, TBS, CBC Television and BS-TBS. (Note: MBS listed the series premiere on October 2 at 26:53 (effectively October 3 at 1:53 a.m. JST).) The opening theme song is "Ignite", performed by JO1, and the ending theme song is "Trick Star", performed by go!go!vanillas.

Crunchyroll streamed the first season worldwide outside of Asia. Disney Platform Distribution licensed both the second and third season, releasing on Hulu in the United States and on Disney+ worldwide. Muse Communication has licensed the series in Southeast Asia and South Asia, streaming it on its Muse Asia YouTube channel and Bilibili. The series premiered on Animax Asia in November 2021. The English dub made its broadcast television premiere in the United States on Adult Swim's Toonami programming block on February 8, 2026.

=== Live-action films ===
A live-action film adaptation was announced in February 2020. The film was directed by Tsutomu Hanabusa, with a screenplay by Izumi Takahashi, and music by Yutaka Yamada. The cast includes Takumi Kitamura, Yūki Yamada, Yosuke Sugino, Nobuyuki Suzuki, Hayato Isomura, Shotaro Mamiya, Ryo Yoshizawa, and Mio Imada. The theme song for the film is "Namae wo Yobu yo" (名前を呼ぶよ) by Super Beaver. In April 2020, it was announced that the film's crew has halted filming due to the COVID-19 pandemic. The film was originally set to open in Japan on October 9, 2020, but due to the continuing effects of COVID-19, the film was delayed to July 9, 2021. Crunchyroll streamed the film outside of Japan.

A sequel titled Tokyo Revengers 2: Bloody Halloween (東京リベンジャーズ2 血のハロウィン編, Tōkyō Ribenjāzu 2 Chi no Harowin-hen), was announced in July 2022. It adapts the "Bloody Halloween" arc and was released in two parts titled Destiny (運命, Unmei) and Decisive Battle (決戦, Kessen). The first film premiered on April 21, 2023, and the second premiered on June 30 of the same year. New cast members include Kento Nagayama, Nijiro Murakami, and Mahiro Takasugi. Super Beaver performed the theme songs for both films titled "Gradation" (グラデーション) and "Hakanakunai" (儚くない), respectively.

=== Stage plays ===
A stage play adaptation produced by Office Endless ran from August 6–22, 2021, with shows taking place in Tokyo, Osaka, and Kanagawa. The play was directed by Naohiro Ise. The theme song of the stage play was "Hero" by Sir Vanity, a pop rock band headlined by voice actors Yūichirō Umehara and Yoshiki Nakajima.

A second stage play, titled Tokyo Revengers: Bloody Halloween, ran from March 18–21, 2022, in Osaka and from March 25 to April 5 in Tokyo.

=== Video games ===
A smartphone puzzle RPG video game published by Goodroid, titled Tokyo Revengers Puzz Reve! (東京リベンジャーズ ぱずりべ！, Tōkyō Ribenjāzu Pazuribe!), was released for iOS and Android devices on December 8, 2022. It was released globally on December 6, 2023.

A free-to-play action role-playing game, subtitled Last Mission, was announced in June 2023 by Victor Entertainment. It was originally set to be released in 2023 in Japan for iOS, Android, PlayStation 4, PlayStation 5, Nintendo Switch, and Windows, but was delayed and released on November 7, 2024. The game ended service on January 21, 2026.

Manjiro Sano and Ken Ryuguji are featured as playable downloadable content characters in Fatal Fury: City of the Wolves. They were added to the roster on October 22, 2026.

== Reception ==
=== Popularity ===
In 2021, Tokyo Revengers won in the anime category of the Yahoo! Japan Search Awards, based on the number of searches for a particular term compared to the year before. The series topped the list of "Trend Rankings Selected by Teens in 2021" by Mynavi Corporation's Mynavi Teens Lab, which conducts teen marketing and research. The anime series was highlighted by Nikkei Entertainment as one of the 2021's biggest hits, ranked in as the top-watched streaming program for both male and female audiences. The series won the "Anime Award" for its popularity on the 2021 Twitter Japan's Trend Awards. The anime adaptation of Tokyo Revengers became the seventh most discussed TV show of 2021 worldwide on Twitter.

=== Manga ===
==== Sales ====
By February 2020, the manga had over 3 million copies in circulation; it had over 17 million copies in circulation by May 2021; over 20 million copies in circulation by June 2021; over 25 million copies in circulation by July 2021; over 35 million copies in circulation by August 2021; over 40 million copies in circulation by September 2021; over 50 million copies in circulation by January 2022; over 65 million copies in circulation by July 2022, including 7 million copies outside of Japan; over 70 million copies in circulation by December 2022; and over 80 million copies in circulation by June 2024.

Tokyo Revengers was the third best-selling manga series in the first half of 2021 with over 5 million copies sold. It was the third best-selling manga in 2021, with over 24.9 million copies sold. It was the second best-selling manga series in 2022, with over 11 million copies sold; volumes 25–29 were among the 25 best-selling manga volumes of the year. Volumes 30 and 31 were among the best-selling manga volumes of 2023.

==== Accolades ====
Tokyo Revengers won the 44th Kodansha Manga Award in the shōnen category in 2020. The series ranked ninth on the 2021 "Book of the Year" list by Da Vinci magazine; it ranked eighteenth on the 2022 list. It ranked twelfth on Takarajimasha's Kono Manga ga Sugoi! 2022 list of best manga for male readers.

=== Anime ===
==== Awards and nominations ====
Year	Award	Category	Recipient	Result	Ref.
2021	MTV Video Music Awards Japan	Video of the Year	"Cry Baby" by Official Hige Dandism	Won	
2021	MTV Video Music Awards Japan	Best Group Video (Japan)	"Cry Baby" by Official Hige Dandism	Won	
2021	27th Salón del Manga de Barcelona	Best Anime Series Premiere on Platforms/TV	Tokyo Revengers	Nominated	
2021	Yahoo! Japan Search Awards	Anime Category	Tokyo Revengers	Won	
2021	Anime Buzzword Awards	Silver Prize	Are there any fence-sitters here?	Won	
2021	Reiwa Anisong Awards	Composition Award	Satoshi Fujihara for "Cry Baby" by Official Hige Dandism	Won	
2021	Reiwa Anisong Awards	Artist Song Award	"Cry Baby" by Official Hige Dandism	Nominated	
2021	Twitter Japan's Trend Awards	Anime Award	Tokyo Revengers	Won	
2022	D-Anime Store Awards	Hottest Anime	Tokyo Revengers	Won	
2022	6th Crunchyroll Anime Awards	Best Antagonist	Tetta Kisaki	Nominated	
2022	6th Crunchyroll Anime Awards	Best Boy	Ken 'Draken' Ryuguji	Nominated	
2022	6th Crunchyroll Anime Awards	Best Boy	Manjiro 'Mikey' Sano	Nominated	
2022	6th Crunchyroll Anime Awards	Best Opening Sequence	"Cry Baby" by Official Hige Dandism	Nominated	
2022	6th Crunchyroll Anime Awards	Best Voice Artist Performance (French)	Olivier Premel as Takemichi Hanagaki	Nominated	
2022	6th Crunchyroll Anime Awards	Best Voice Artist Performance (Portuguese)	Luiz Sergio Vieira as Takemichi Hanagaki	Nominated	
2022	36th Japan Gold Disc Award	Best 5 Songs by Streaming	"Cry Baby" by Official Hige Dandism	Won	
2022	36th Japan Gold Disc Award	Best 5 Songs by Downloads	"Cry Baby" by Official Hige Dandism	Won	
2022	17th AnimaniA Awards	Best Online Series	Tokyo Revengers	Won	
2022	44th Anime Grand Prix	Best Theme Song	"Cry Baby" by Official Hige Dandism	2nd place	
2022	12th Newtype Anime Awards	Best Work (TV)	Tokyo Revengers	7th place	
2023	45th Anime Grand Prix	Grand Prix	Tokyo Revengers: Christmas Showdown	10th place	

==== Censorship ====
Official international releases censor the Buddhist manji swastika (卍) symbol used by the Tokyo Manji Gang by outright removing it or placing rays of light over them to avoid potential controversy that may arise from confusion with the similar but Nazi-misappropriated left-facing (卐) symbol. The censorship was carried out by the producers of the anime for international licensors, affecting all versions officially distributed outside Japan. However, this decision has also proven to be controversial, with some fans criticizing the resulting version both on technical and freedom of speech grounds. Due to backlash from audiences, the official Southeast Asian and South Asian releases of the series by Muse Communication began releasing the uncensored versions.
