= Soulsoup =

Single by Official Hige Dandism

from the album Rejoice
- Released: December 13, 2023
- Genre: J-pop; pop rock
- Length: 5:14
- Label: Irori
- Composer: Satoshi Fujihara
- Lyricist: Satoshi Fujihara

Official Hige Dandism singles chronology
"Nichijō" (2023)	"Soulsoup" (2023)	"Same Blue" (2024)

Music video
- "Soulsoup" on YouTube

"Soulsoup" (stylized in all caps) is a song recorded by Japanese band Official Hige Dandism. The song was released on December 13, 2023, under Irori Records. The song served as the theme song for the movie Spy × Family Code: White.

== Background ==
Official Hige Dandism had previously written "Mixed Nuts" for Spy × Family during season 1. In October 2023, the band announced the song "Soulsoup" as the theme song for Spy × Family Code: White.

== Lyrics ==
The lyrics of "Soulsoup" have been described as "a metaphorical soup representing life's struggles, resonate well with the narrative."

== Music video ==
The music video, which was directed by Hidenobu Tanabe, was published on YouTube on December 12, 2023.

== Charts ==
=== Weekly charts ===
Weekly chart performance for "Soulsoup"
Chart (2023)	Peak position
Japan (Japan Hot 100)	12

=== Year-end charts ===
Year-end chart performance for "Soulsoup"
Chart (2024)	Position
Japan (Japan Hot 100)	91

== Certifications ==
Certifications for "Soulsoup"
Region	Certification	Certified units/sales
Streaming
Japan (RIAJ)	Gold	50,000,000^{†}
^{†} Streaming-only figures based on certification alone.
