= List of Beastars episodes =

Logo of the Beastars anime series.

The Beastars anime series takes place in a world of modern, civilized, anthropomorphic animals with a cultural divide between carnivores and herbivores. The series takes its name from the in-universe rank of Beastar, an individual of great talent, service, and notoriety. The story focuses on the gray wolf Legoshi as he deals with his attraction to the rabbit Haru.

In the 10th issue of 2019 of Weekly Shōnen Champion, it was announced that Beastars would get an anime television series adaptation animated by CG studio Orange. Shin'ichi Matsumi directed the series, with Nanami Higuchi handling series composition, Nao Ootsu designing the characters, and Satoru Kōsaki composing the series' music. The series aired from October 10 to December 26, 2019, and aired on Fuji TV's +Ultra anime programming block and other channels. The first season was 12 episodes in total, with the Netflix release outside of Japan on March 13, 2020. At the conclusion of the television broadcast, a second season was announced. Animation studio Orange returned to produce the second season, which aired from January 7 to March 25, 2021.

ALI performed the series' opening theme song "Wild Side", while Yurika performed the series' ending theme songs "Le zoo" (ep. 2, 5, 8 and 9), "Sleeping instinct" (ep. 3, 7 and 10), "Marble" (ep. 4, 6 and 11) and "Floating Story on the Moon" (ep. 12). The opening theme song for the second season is "Kaibutsu" (怪物; "Monster"), while the ending theme song is "Yasashii Suisei" (優しい彗星; "A Kind Comet"), both performed by Yoasobi. Season 1 of Beastars was released on March 13, 2020, on Netflix outside of Japan, followed by its second on July 15, 2021.

On July 20, 2021, Studio Orange and Netflix Japan announced that the anime series would be receiving a third and final season, subtitled Final Season as its onscreen title. The final season was split into two cours, with the first released on December 5, 2024. The opening is "Into the World" by Satoru Kōsaki and Issei, with the ending theme "Feel Like This" by YU-KA.

The second cours premiered on March 7, 2026. The opening is "La Feralia" by Satoru Kōsaki, with the ending theme "Tiny Light" by Seventeen.

== Series overview ==
Season	Episodes		Originally released	
Season	Episodes		First released	Last released
1	12		October 10, 2019	December 26, 2019
2	12		January 7, 2021	March 25, 2021
3	24	12	December 5, 2024	
3	24	12	March 7, 2026	

== Episodes ==
=== Season 1 (2019) ===
No. overall	No. in season	Title	Directed by (Note: Information is taken from the ending credits of each episode.)	Written by	Original release date
1	1	"The Moon and the Beast"; Transliteration: "Mangetsu wa Terasu Kemono o Eranderu" (Japanese: 満月は照らす獣を選んでる)	Shin'ichi Matsumi	Nanami Higuchi	October 10, 2019 (Note: This episode was pre-screened on October 8, 2019 on Netflix Japan.)
Tem, an alpaca, is murdered and eaten by an unknown carnivore late at night. As tensions rise between the herbivores and carnivores across the campus of Cherryton, the school's drama club attempts to continue practicing for their play in honor of their late member. A white dwarf rabbit named Haru is bullied by her classmates while a grey wolf named Legoshi tries to work with his red deer classmate Louis on settling tensions in the club. While Louis attempts to provide extra practice for Tem's replacement late in the evening, Legoshi stands watch outside the theater, but suddenly finds himself drawn to Haru.
2	2	"The Academy's Top Dogs"; Transliteration: "Gakuen no Shinzō-bu wa Teien ni Ari" (Japanese: 学園の心臓部は庭園にあり)	Yasuhiro Geshi	Nanami Higuchi	October 17, 2019
Legoshi attempts to fight his carnivorous urges that try to convince him to eat Haru, as he injures the rabbit's arm. She escapes when Legoshi is distracted by a classmate who alerts him about Louis injuring himself in the darkened theater. The next day, Louis helps break up a fight in the Cherryton cafeteria, and later carries on rehearsing his lead role in the drama club play while hiding his injured leg. The drama club decides to get some roses to decorate a set piece in the play, and give the job to Legoshi, who discovers that Haru is the sole member of the Gardening Club. He helps her with some gardening tasks while worrying that she might recognize him as the attacker from last night. Haru offers him her body in thanks for his help, frightening Legoshi as she strips down to her underwear and attempts to seduce him.
3	3	"A Wolf Is Born"; Transliteration: "Osuōkami Shussei no Toki" (Japanese: オスオオカミ 出生のとき)	Makoto Sokuza	Nanami Higuchi	October 24, 2019
Legoshi abruptly flees from the scantily-clad Haru before she finishes disrobing him as she tries to get him to have sex, as some herbivores talk about a rumor that Haru is a slut who has slept with multiple men. Legoshi tries to sort through his own feelings for Haru, as a wolf, and as a male. Meanwhile, Louis pushes himself to get through his part in the drama club's play, even though his injured leg is getting worse, and he finds himself increasingly irritated at Legoshi suppressing his carnivore strength. Louis manages to pull off a grand performance, but after the curtain falls on the play, Louis collapses on stage.
4	4	"Give It Your All"; Transliteration: "Kimi wa Seihai Made Fuyakashite" (Japanese: 君は聖杯までふやかして)	Atsushi Yukawa	Nanami Higuchi	October 31, 2019
Louis wakes up in the Cherryton school infirmary to discover that he has fractured his leg, and decides to give his lead role to Bill the Bengal tiger. Legoshi is forced to take Bill's role as one of the villains of the play. As the second day of the performance arrives, Bill reveals to Legoshi that he took a few drops of rabbit's blood to prepare. During the play, Bill starts to flub his lines while the audience wonders what happened to Louis. Legoshi breaks character and starts fighting Bill on stage for real, venting his anger against Bill for using rabbit blood to "dope" and against his own violent actions against Haru. When Bill claws back, Louis suddenly appears and breaks up the fight, drawing applause.
5	5	"Two Sides to the Story"; Transliteration: "Shippo no Yogore ni mo Riyū o Mīdasu Otoshigoro" (Japanese: しっぽの汚れにも理由を見出すお年頃)	Yasuhiro Geshi	Nanami Higuchi	November 7, 2019
Because of the publicity the on-stage fight has gathered (if for the wrong reasons), Louis refrains from suspending Legoshi and Bill from the drama club. A month later, the club is called on to participate in the upcoming Meteor Festival. Legoshi is still insecure about his growing feelings for Haru, who in turn begins to see him in a better light for his friendliness and modesty. Eventually, after having dinner together in the cafeteria, she shares her name with him.
6	6	"Blurred Vision – Dream or Reality?"; Transliteration: "Shikai no Nijimi Yume ka Utsutsu ka" (Japanese: 視界の滲み 夢か現か)	Makoto Sokuza	Nanami Higuchi	November 14, 2019
The community is startled by another brutal herbivore murder committed by carnivores. Legoshi saves a young wolf girl named Juno from a couple of bullies, winning her affection. Later, he, Aoba and a group of their peers go downtown to city hall to collect information for the Meteor Festival. Then, after spending the day in the city, they get lost and stray into a district called the Black Market, where Legoshi is horrified to see herbivores selling their own body parts to passing carnivores. While running away through the market, Legoshi is overcome by the scent of meat and passes out in a back alley. There he is picked up by the Black Market's psychotherapist and guardian, who explains to Legoshi that his feelings for Haru are actually his predatory instincts disguised as romantic feelings. When Legoshi explains to him that he has no prior experience with love, he gives him a rabbit-themed erotic magazine to test whether those feelings are based on love or predatory instincts. On his way back to school, Legoshi runs into Aoba, who was likewise disgusted by the Black Market, and the two reconcile.
7	7	"Below the Fur Coat"; Transliteration: "Seifuku to Hike no Sono Mata Shita no" (Japanese: 制服と被毛のそのまた下の)	Kensuke Yamamoto	Nanami Higuchi	November 21, 2019
Legom, a hen student who regularly delivers her eggs to the school cafeteria for the carnivore students, is devoted to making sure her eggs are of the highest quality. As Louis exits Haru's garden clubhouse, he runs into Legoshi, and they realize that both of them have an interest in Haru. Jack finds the erotic magazine and confronts Legoshi with it, who explains that he thought he had an interest in a female rabbit but is convinced that he has no feelings for her. Despite his efforts to distance himself from Haru, Legoshi eventually admits to himself that he is actually in love with her.
8	8	"Caught Like Floss in a Canine's Teeth"; Transliteration: "Kenshi ni Ito Yōji Hikkakeru yō ni" (Japanese: 犬歯に糸ようじひっかけるように)	Yasuhiro Geshi	Nanami Higuchi	November 28, 2019
The first preparations for the Meteor Festival are finished. When Haru finds herself alone out at dusk, Legoshi offers to go back to school together with her, but struggles with his inner conflict between his carnivorous instincts and his love for Haru. Juno confronts Louis with her goals of becoming the next Beastar and winning Legoshi's heart. When she and Legoshi wander the festival grounds, a temporary blackout causes the worried Legoshi to look for Haru, which is witnessed by Juno.
9	9	"Into the Lion's Den"; Transliteration: "Erebētā Saijōkai no Senritsu" (Japanese: エレベーター最上階の戦慄)	Makoto Sokuza	Nanami Higuchi	December 5, 2019
Louis reminisces about his childhood, when he grew up as illegal livestock for carnivores until he was taken in by Oguma, head of the Horns Conglomerate, who adopted him as his son. Legoshi prevents a carnivore student from attacking Louis, and discovers that Louis has been marked for lynching because him becoming the next Beastar might render carnivores underprivileged. Legoshi sets up a meeting with Haru to confess his feelings to her, but Haru is kidnapped by Shishigumi, a criminal lion gang whose head intends to eat her. Fearing that this incident will endanger his position, the Mayor forbids any investigation in this matter, even blackmailing Louis with his livestock background to keep him quiet. Misunderstanding Louis's hesitation to look for Haru, Legoshi gets into a fight with Louis before deciding to rescue her by himself.
10	10	"A Wolf in Sheep's Clothing"; Transliteration: "Watage, Chi no Hate Made ou Naraba" (Japanese: 綿毛、地の果てまで追うならば)	Daiki Katō	Nanami Higuchi	December 12, 2019
Beginning his search for Shishigumi in the Black Market, Legoshi is soon begrudgingly joined by the panda doctor Gouhin after Legoshi convinces him of his feelings for Haru. Driven by Haru's lingering smell and Gouhin's advice, Legoshi unleashes his bestial instincts, allowing him to fight his way past the Shishigumi guards. While thinking about Legoshi and recalling how she became who she was by having sex with a male rabbit classmate, Haru finds the strength to stand up against her captors, allowing Legoshi to reach her just in time.
11	11	"To the Neon District"; Transliteration: "Yuki Yukite Natsu no Neon-gai" (Japanese: ゆきゆきて 夏のネオン街)	Yasuhiro Geshi	Nanami Higuchi	December 19, 2019
While his friends at school notice his absence and begin to worry, Legoshi defeats the Shishigumi boss in a bloody fight to save Haru. As he and Haru leave the Shishigumi hideout, the boss tries to shoot Legoshi in the head, but is instead killed by Louis, who has also come to rescue Haru, as he is then cornered by several Shishigumi members. As they rest in a love hotel for the night, Legoshi admits that it was he who attacked Haru by the fountain that night. Haru confesses that she has always suspected it, but still came to like Legoshi for his kind nature. But as they attempt to have their first sexual encounter together, their instincts as carnivore and herbivore get in the way yet again.
12	12	"In the Storm's Wake"; Transliteration: "Karan no Ushiro Sugata" (Japanese: 夏嵐の後ろ姿)	Shin'ichi Matsumi	Nanami Higuchi	December 26, 2019
After involuntarily acting on her instincts of wanting to be eaten, Haru apologizes for ruining the mood. They return to school where Juno corners Haru and, after finding out they didn't have sex, challenges her for Legoshi's heart, while Louis is then pronounced missing after he fails to arrive at school. The Meteor Festival begins, but before Legoshi can confess to Haru, Juno brings him on stage and announces his heroism of saving a herbivore to the crowd, which applauds his bravery. She arranges to light a candle with him, to signify their relationship. Later, Legoshi leaves in search of Haru, who had trudged off believing that Juno would be better than her for Legoshi. Legoshi finds her and explains his feelings, but admits to her that he needs an unknown amount of time to get stronger so that he doesn't lose to his instincts, to which she replies that she will wait for him. Sometime later, in a post-credits scene, Legoshi encounters an unseen character, who walks with him but begins smiling for no apparent reason.

=== Season 2 (2021) ===
No. overall	No. in season	Title	Directed by	Written by	Original release date
13	1	"A Teen's Never-Ending Alarm"; Transliteration: "Shōnen no Mezame wa Nandome no Arāmu ka" (Japanese: 少年の目覚めは何度目のアラームか)	Mie Ōishi	Nanami Higuchi	January 7, 2021 (Note: This episode was pre-screened on January 5, 2021 on Netflix Japan and aired on January 7, 2021 at 1:35 a.m. JST, 40 minutes after the original air time on Fuji TV.)
As time passes, Legoshi becomes worried that his relationship with Haru has not progressed despite his love confession. Louis is revealed to have survived his previous encounter but decides to quit the drama club. Meanwhile, Legoshi's friends talk about ghosts in the school.
14	2	"The Grey Police Hound Runs"; Transliteration: "Haiiro no Keisatsuken Toriaezu Hashitteru" (Japanese: 灰色の警察犬とりあえず走ってる)	Yasuhiro Geshi	Nanami Higuchi	January 14, 2021
The All-Organism Council Meeting is discussing Cherryton's situation regarding a Beastar candidate, and it is decided that the person who solves Tem's murder shall be made the next Beastar. Meanwhile, Legoshi is tasked by Rokume to investigate and find clues about who Tem's killer might be. Louis is the new boss of the Shishigumi.
15	3	"Changes"; Transliteration: "Sonna Namari o Nodo ni Tsumarasete" (Japanese: そんな鉛を喉に詰まらせて)	Makoto Sokuza	Nanami Higuchi	January 21, 2021
Louis now works with the Shishigumi, and in order to assert his authority, he is forced to ingest meat. A young new member arrives at the drama club. Members' hearts are baffled by the presence of playboy Pina, a big-horned Dall sheep who is full of confidence that he can easily get hot girls in his bed with leverage from his looks, popularity, and a defeatist attitude. After his club friends comment about his relationship with Haru, Legoshi considers maintaining a distance from her.
16	4	"Entangled"; Transliteration: "Mi o Yosetara Ke ga Karamatte Shimau Kara" (Japanese: 身を寄せたら毛が絡まってしまうから)	Daiki Katō	Nanami Higuchi	January 28, 2021
As he tries to focus on finding Tem's killer, Legoshi is attacked by a huge carnivore figure. In a hint of despair, Legoshi makes an unexpected counterattack to obtain clues about the culprit, and leaves school to learn from Gohin how to overcome his carnivorous instincts. The Shishigumi's reputation in the Black Market continues to grow after saving a stripper from death at the hands of a carnivore lusting after her naked body combined with an appetite for fresh meat. Louis gets a surprise visitor.
17	5	"Call It Like It Is"; Transliteration: "Shiro wa Monokuro no Naka de mo Shiroi Mama" (Japanese: 白はモノクロの中でも白いまま)	Mie Ōishi	Nanami Higuchi	February 4, 2021
Juno visits Louis at the Black Market and attempts to convince him to go back to school, but Louis's determination is unshakable. Legoshi, who became Gohin's disciple, cuts off his fur to disguise himself so that the Shishigumi won't recognize him, and begins a harsh training where he remains in school during the day and in the Black Market during the night.
18	6	"Fly, O Corrupt One"; Transliteration: "Tobe Hakaisō" (Japanese: 飛べ 破戒僧)	Keiya Saitō	Nanami Higuchi	February 11, 2021
Louis forces Oguma to sign him off the school, which Oguma grants willingly, believing that Louis is just going through a difficult phase. Legoshi fights his instincts due to the training that Gohin has imposed on him. However, he realizes that what he faces is "someone who was once alive" and manages to control his own desires by respecting life. Haru appears in front of Legoshi, who is exhausted after returning to the academy, and he proposes to her. When Bill challenges him to a tug of war using their teeth, Legoshi loses and is left wondering what happened to his jaw strength.
19	7	"Unforgettable Sweetness"; Transliteration: "Mitsuzuke no Kioku" (Japanese: 蜜漬けの記憶)	Ryōsuke Shibuya	Nanami Higuchi	February 18, 2021
While alone in the locker room, Legoshi tastes the water bottles of every male carnivore member of the drama club in order to identify Tem's killer. After a horrifying incident during practice, Legoshi and Riz take Kibi to the infirmary, after which Legoshi reveals to Riz that he knows he is the culprit. Before they can start fighting, Pina interrupts them and blackmails Riz. Due to this incident, the school is set to become segregated and all clubs suspended, but the club members are not giving up. Riz reminisces about the times he spent with Tem and vows to always cherish those memories until the day he dies.
20	8	"Laughing at the Shadows We Cast"; Transliteration: "Hikari o Abitara Shiruetto no Chigai o Waraō" (Japanese: 光を浴びたらシルエットの違いを笑おう)	Mie Ōishi	Nanami Higuchi	February 25, 2021
Sheila doesn't want to only be used in Peach's photos just for "likes", so she invites her to a day of shopping. Legoshi learns about the strength of his limbs by stopping a ferocious meat addict as part of Gohin's training. Juno is offered the main role in the school play, but after spending some time with Haru in the gardening club, she considers herself unfit to be a candidate for the Beastar title. After a visit to a hyperdrugs store, Ibuki reveals to Louis that their childhoods aren't so different.
21	9	"A Busted Electric Fan"; Transliteration: "Bukkowareteru Senpūki" (Japanese: ぶっ壊れてる扇風機)	Keiya Saitō	Nanami Higuchi	March 4, 2021
Legoshi steadily gains strength thanks to Gohin's training, but is impatient for not being strong enough to defeat a brown bear. Tao visits Kibi and cries tears of joy because the surgery was a success. At the Black Market, Legoshi accidentally runs into Louis and the Shishigumi. While alone, Legoshi tries to persuade Louis to leave this life, but he insists that he was always a part of it. At the drama club, Riz's hypocrisy and nice bear act infuriates Legoshi, but Pina steps in to calm things down.
22	10	"The Chef's Suspense"; Transliteration: "Shefu no Kimagure Sasupensu" (Japanese: シェフの気まぐれサスペンス)	Makoto Sokuza	Nanami Higuchi	March 11, 2021
While preparing dinner for his roommates, Riz reflects on what happened with Tem and the situation of Legoshi and Pina knowing he is the culprit. Haru and Legoshi have a talk and he vows to not let her be unhappy anymore. After a traumatizing encounter with Riz in the bathroom, Pina gives a stunning performance during rehearsal, leaving the drama club members stunned. Riz and Legoshi get into an intense fight, but circumstances cause them to postpone their fight until New Year's Eve.
23	11	"Scatter Your Scales" (Note: The title is written without the particle の in the episode.); Transliteration: "Anata no Rinpun Furimaite" (Japanese: あなたの鱗粉振りまいて)	Daiki Katō	Nanami Higuchi	March 18, 2021
Legoshi eats a live caterpillar, causing his fur to grow back. He disguises himself as a woman to go to the Black Market and tell Louis about his upcoming duel. As Riz goes off to meet with Legoshi, Pina intercepts him to coax and record a confession about killing Tem from him, but Riz discovers the setup. Finally, just before they clash, Riz shows Legoshi bloodstains on his shirt and hands to provoke him. Louis decides to leave the Shishigumi to go help Legoshi, but Ibuki won't let him leave so easily.
24	12	"The Taste of Rebellion"; Transliteration: "Kakumei no Chisō" (Japanese: 革命の馳走)	Shin'ichi Matsumi	Nanami Higuchi	March 25, 2021
Ibuki gives Louis an ultimatum - to kill him or be killed by him. Free arrives and kills Ibuki, but warns Louis never to come back to the Black Market. As they fight, Legoshi is close to losing to Riz. During a short intervention by Louis who offers Legoshi to eat his right foot, Legoshi's full strength is achieved, enabling him to hold his own. Pina, having been tied up by Riz, frees himself and calls the police. Riz declares Legoshi the winner and stops the fight at the stroke of New Year's Eve with a new understanding of each other. Legoshi and Riz are jailed, but Legoshi receives an early release, while Louis makes a recovery. Legoshi tells Haru that he is considering dropping out of school, whereupon Haru challenges him to consider what this will mean for their relationship which causes him to begin reconsidering.

=== Season 3: Final Season (2024–26) ===
==== Part 1 (2024) ====
No. overall	No. in season	Title	Directed by	Written by	Original release date
25	1	"An Itchy Collar"; Transliteration: "Itagayui Kubiwa" (Japanese: 痛痒い首輪)	Daiki Katō	Nanami Higuchi; Shin'ichi Matsumi	December 5, 2024
After dropping out of school, Legoshi deals with the after-effects of consuming meat. This conflict brings him into contention with a new neighbor, as well as the worry of his remaining family. Now graduated, Haru witnesses the real-world implications of interspecies relationships, though unbeknownst to her, Legoshi is forbidden from such things due to his new criminal record. During the Black Market's annual "Meat-Loving Day", the Shishigumi are approached by a violent individual claiming to be their new boss.
26	2	"The Shiny Black Nose Before Me"; Transliteration: "Mokuzen ni Kurobikari no Hana" (Japanese: 目前に黒光りの鼻)	Mie Ōishi	Nanami Higuchi; Shin'ichi Matsumi	December 5, 2024
Legoshi is introduced to his lamb neighbor, Seven, after attempting to devour her due to the symptoms of meat withdrawal. The Shishigumi's new boss attempts to profit off a new energy drink, known as Kines, that contains ingredients of herbivores, which catches the eye of Louis. The city's reigning Beastar, a horse named Yahya, works with the 500 Cornered Rats syndicate to find the source of the Kines drink. While walking home, Legoshi is offered some by street hustlers.
27	3	"An Old Dragon's Wrath"; Transliteration: "Rō Ryū no Gekirin" (Japanese: 老竜の逆鱗)	Shigetaka Ikeda	Nanami Higuchi; Shin'ichi Matsumi	December 5, 2024
After internal inspiration from Louis, Legoshi beats the hustlers due to his convictions of protecting herbivores. At school, the drama club weighs in on their future due to the forced segregation between species. While doing his rounds ensuring herbivore equality, Yahya gains interest in Legoshi after the hustler beating. After briefly catching up with Haru, Legoshi is tracked down by his Komodo dragon grandfather, whose pacifist ideals is challenged by a gang of delinquent eagles.
28	4	"The Gravity of Being a Land Dweller"; Transliteration: "Rikujō Dōbutsu no Jūryoku" (Japanese: 陸上動物の重力)	Daiki Katō	Nanami Higuchi; Shin'ichi Matsumi	December 5, 2024
Legoshi's grandfather beats the eagle gang, surprising Legoshi. Not long after, Yahya investigates the incident and realizes Legoshi's grandfather was his former Beastar-in-training best friend Gosha, who gave up the dream after becoming entangled with a female wolf he and Yahya saved. After having previously been kissed by Juno, Louis becomes conflicted with his future arranged marriage. While doing his delivery rounds for work, Legoshi meets a seal named Sagwan who explains the ocean's simplicity of "eat and be eaten", which goes against the typical law of the land.
29	5	"In the Food Chain"; Transliteration: "Shokumotsu Rensa ni imasu" (Japanese: 食物連鎖にいます)	Shigetaka Ikeda	Nanami Higuchi; Shin'ichi Matsumi	December 5, 2024
After catching up with the drama club, Legoshi is met by Louis, who reaffirms their mutual bond for the preservation of carnivore/herbivore relationships. Elsewhere, Melon, the new leader of the Shishigumi, sends its members to meet with a civet named Deshico, the producer of a coffee industry whose effects are more potent than the Kines energy drink. Later, Legoshi receives an invitation from Yahya, though their encounter is set up as a challenge for the young wolf due to his past devouring record. While begging for his life and forgiveness, Legoshi manually rips out his own fangs as penance.
30	6	"The Guy Born in Spring"; Transliteration: "Haru Umare no Aitsu" (Japanese: 春生まれのあいつ)	Mie Ōishi	Nanami Higuchi; Shin'ichi Matsumi	December 5, 2024
Acknowledging his sins, Legoshi departs from Yahya and receives prosthetic fangs from Gohin as he treats a new devouring patient. While investigating the collection of ivory from elephant skeletons, Yahya connects it to a condo where an influential gazelle lives. Sneaking inside, the gazelle is revealed to be Melon, who catches and incapacitates Yahya. At college, Haru confronts a fellow rabbit friend about the authenticity of their romantic relationship to a lion. To prove their relationship is real, they kiss, but instincts cause the lion to injure the rabbit mid-devour.
31	7	"Eat My Vow"; Transliteration: "Boku no Chikai o Tabete" (Japanese: 僕の誓いを食べて)	Daiki Katō	Nanami Higuchi; Shin'ichi Matsumi	December 5, 2024
Haru surprises Legoshi on his birthday by showing up at his work. They go on a date, where he reveals all of his internal struggles due to devouring Louis's leg. To know Legoshi better, they visit the Black Market where Haru asks for a kiss, though he declines due to his conflict of being unable to marry her. At work, Louis notices a co-worker experiencing meat withdrawal after drinking Kines. He then meets up with Juno and informs her of his arranged marriage, which she challenges. Juno runs to Legoshi for advice regarding inter-species relationships, where he realizes his unfair treatment of Haru's feelings.
32	8	"What Lies at the End of the Melon Patch"; Transliteration: "Meron Hata no Sakini wa" (Japanese: メロン畑の先には)	Shigetaka Ikeda	Nanami Higuchi; Shin'ichi Matsumi	December 5, 2024
Flyers are spread around the Black Market by Melon claiming Yahya is dead, sending the district into a frenzy of sales. Though injured, Yahya ponders his next move and sends the 500 Cornered Rats to find out more. They discover the Shishigumi's partnership with Deshico, a masquerade event to reveal the spiked coffee to the public, and Melon's identity as the offspring of a mixed-species relationship. Desiring to test Legoshi's resolve of his own potential mixed-species relationship with Haru, Yahya asks for his assistance taking Melon down. Elsewhere, Louis gets the results back of his Kines inquiry.
33	9	"The Rotten Egg Hatches"; Transliteration: "Tamago no Fuka ni Tachiatte" (Japanese: 卵の孵化に立ち会って)	Daiki Katō	Nanami Higuchi; Shin'ichi Matsumi	December 5, 2024
Though both the school and the Meteor Festival decline the drama club's participation, the members decide to work together, breaking the segregation law, to create a show that can't be refused. Going undercover, Legoshi and Yahya enter Melon's masquerade party in search of him. Legoshi finds him, but is cornered by the gazelle/leopard hybrid atop the venue's scaffolding. After getting to know each other, Melon reveals his knowledge of Yahya' scheme and shoots Legoshi pointblank.
34	10	"Bambi is Alive and Well"; Transliteration: "Banbi-shi, Kenzai" (Japanese: バンビ氏、健在)	Mie Ōishi	Nanami Higuchi; Shin'ichi Matsumi	December 5, 2024
Louis discovers the herbivore ingredients of Kines, but needs the research of someone in the Black Market for additional testing. He is caught by the Shishigumi lions, who forgo Ibuki's prior warning and take him in after his horns shed. When Melon appears, the lions hide Louis, even to the point of torture, before he eventually departs. Legoshi awakens in a state of limbo where he is met by the spirit of his mother. She confirms her suicide was due to prejudice at being mixed-species, but charges him with preserving his kind nature of connecting herbivores and carnivores in harmony.
35	11	"Peeling Back the Layers"; Transliteration: "Kaniku o Kiriwakete" (Japanese: 果肉を切り分けて)	Shigetaka Ikeda	Nanami Higuchi; Shin'ichi Matsumi	December 5, 2024
Louis's investigation leads him to Deshico, who reveals his knowledge of Kines and how it effects carnivores who have previously eaten meat. After Yahya claims to have no leads, Legoshi decides to hunt for Melon on his own. He meets up with Sagwan and is perturbed by the seal's willingness to consume cooked sea creatures, follow's the ocean's principles of "eat and be eaten". In order to feel "alive", Melon covers his spreading leopard spots with foliage tattoos and receives a new one, but departs just before Legoshi can sniff him out.
36	12	"Tragedy on the Waves"; Transliteration: "Shiosai no Torajidī" (Japanese: 潮騒のトラジディー)	Daiki Katō	Nanami Higuchi; Shin'ichi Matsumi	December 5, 2024
Legoshi overhears a sloth tattoo artist having a delayed-reaction conversation with Melon, leading the wolf to believe the hybrid murderer is secretly lonely. Louis attempts to sneak into Yahya's penthouse to relay his Kines report, but a carnivore security guard catches him post-energy drink and goes on a rampage. Yahya and Louis take him down and broadcast on live TV the impacts of Kines, though Louis's father denounces this action for its ramifications on his company and potentially jeopardizing the arranged marriage. Staring into the beachside sun, Legoshi is ambushed by Melon and the Shushigumi and reveals the sloth conversation was a trap to lure the wolf in. Melon binds Legoshi to a chair and throws him off a cliff into the sea before returning to work as one of Haru's college professors.

==== Part 2 (2026) ====
No. overall	No. in season	Title	Directed by	Written by	Original release date
37	13	"A Threefold Dilemma"; Transliteration: "Kyuukyoku no Santaku?" (Japanese: 究極の３択？)	Shigetaka Ikeda	Nanami Higuchi; Shin'ichi Masami	March 7, 2026
After being dropped into the ocean, Legoshi quotes a phrase in the oceanic language that deters a shark from wanting to eat him to deciding to save him. Legoshi later thanks Sagwan for teaching it to him, who reveals he may carry a lot of influence among seafolk. At school, Haru is the only witness to a zebra professor's apparent suicide, though she sees the silhouette of someone else atop the roof the zebra fell from. Louis visits Legoshi, and the two share their knowledge of their own Kines and Melon investigations. While paying respects to the professor, Haru is approached by Melon, who desires to know Haru's perspective of the incident.
38	14	"Six Tails in a Row"; Transliteration: "Shippo Roppon Nabete" (Japanese: しっぽ６本並べて)	Daiki Katō	Nanami Higuchi; Shin'ichi Masami	March 7, 2026
After writing a new play, Cherryton's principal approves of its concept and allows the drama club to participate in the Meteor Festival as an integrated club. In Melon's office, Haru initially has skepticism regarding the circumstances around the zebra professor's death, but suddenly changes her tone and chooses to tell the police she doesn't suspect anything. Melon persuades her to let him drive her himself. Pondering his career options, Legoshi reunites with his former Cherryton roommates at an animal arcade. He later invites Jack to see his apartment when an onion, toxic to dogs, suddenly falls out of Jack's backpack.
39	15	"In a Dusty Universe"; Transliteration: "Hokori Mau Uchuu de" (Japanese: 埃舞う宇宙で)	Mie Ōishi	Nanami Higuchi; Shin'ichi Masami	March 7, 2026
Due to the stresses of maintaining his academic stature at school, Jack contemplates suicide, though Legoshi reassures and saves him. Yahya visits Deshico, whose coffee effects him as it would a carnivore, indicating he may be a mixed species. Melon's interest in Haru peaks as he grabs her like a carnivore, though she seemingly shrugs it off as a romantic offer given his gazelle-like appearance. She visits Legoshi and the two catch up, though the next morning, Haru has disappeared leaving only red-stained clothing behind.
40	16	"The Red In Our Lives"; Transliteration: "Bokura no Nichijou no, Aka" (Japanese: 僕らの日常の、赤)	Daiki Katō	Nanami Higuchi; Shin'ichi Masami	March 7, 2026
Legoshi panics believing he devoured Haru in his sleep, but she appears at his door and cleans up spilled tomato juice. Convinced of his happiness, Legoshi proposes marriage, which Haru accepts on the condition they attend the Meteor Festival as a couple. At school, the drama club rehearses their new play when Pina recommends swapping the herbivore and carnivore roles to further emphasize the story's meaning. In search of Melon, Legoshi goes to the Shishigumi. They contact Louis and ask for his return as leader in exchange for the information. Louis respectfully declines to protect Ibuki's sacrifice, while the Shishigumi hint at Melon's status as a college professor.
41	17	"Sweet Hunger"; Transliteration: "Amaki Kuufukukan" (Japanese: 甘き空腹感)	Mie Ōishi	Nanami Higuchi; Shin'ichi Masami	March 7, 2026
Stressed about the play, Juno asks to see Louis, and though he declines, she is instead comforted by Haru. Spending time with his fiancé after being named the city's ambassador for the upcoming Zoolympic Games, Louis is shocked to hear her say the Black Market may be "cleaned up" to protect the city's image for the upcoming event. As the Madaragumi's leopards and Inarigumi's foxes duke it out, Louis sneaks into the Market and warms the Shishigumi. Visiting Haru's school, Legoshi catches Melon's scent and locates his office.
42	18	"Upon a Nest of Dried Noodles"; Transliteration: "Kanmen no Su no Ue de" (Japanese: 乾麺の巣の上で)	Shigetaka Ikeda	Nanami Higuchi; Shin'ichi Masami	March 7, 2026
Melon is fired from the college, and when she discovers his mixed-species nature, Haru unwittingly swears to let him devour her one day. She later runs into Louis doing Zoolympics press tours, who is shocked to hear how close Melon was to her, though he admonishes Haru for thinking she's someone's snack. Throughout the city, devourings are increasing, though each carnivore is murdered afterward, which gets the attention of Yahya. At school, Bill discovers a live chick in an egg he cracked for his ramen bowl. After Pina intervenes as he's about to eat the chick, Bill decides to raise it. However, after a power outage makes the chick's heater go out, Bill sadly tells Pina it has died.
43	19	"Feline Fall"; Transliteration: "Neko-ka no Rakka" (Japanese: ネコ科の落下)	Makoto Sokuza	Nanami Higuchi; Shin'ichi Masami	March 7, 2026
Hoping to catch Melon and clear is record so he can marry Haru, Legoshi corners him overlooking the Black Market. Challenging Legoshi's beliefs, Melon hopes to create a society of co-existence and devouring among species before escaping through the Market claiming to be a helpless herbivore. To keep Haru safe, Louis forces her to stay in his family mansion while detailing Melon's true identity. Picking up a Shishigumi trick for decision-making, Legoshi's whiskers point to investigate the tattoo parlor again, but finds its staff murdered. He escapes as police arrive, but leaves his whiskers behind.
44	20	"Gotta Buy a Step Stool"; Transliteration: "Fumidai Kattoko" (Japanese: 踏み台買っとこ)	Daiki Katō	Nanami Higuchi; Shin'ichi Masami	March 7, 2026
Legoshi is wanted by police for the tattoo parlor murders, forcing him to go into hiding with the 500 Cornered Rats syndicate. Knowing the mayor is watching his every move, Louis asks fellow classmates to make a video asking the public to beware of Melon. Ogma, Louis's father and head of the Horns Conglomerate, promotes Chloe, the scientist Louis asked to look into Kines, to research artificial meat for the Zoolympics. After being given protective gear by Legoshi before he went into hiding, Haru feels stalked before she tasers the culprit, who is revealed to be Gosha.
45	21	"The Demon King of Beasts"; Transliteration: "Hyakujuu no Maou" (Japanese: 百獣の魔王)	Mie Ōishi	Nanami Higuchi; Shin'ichi Masami	March 7, 2026
After apologizing for tasering Gosha, Haru is brought to his place and learns about Legoshi's family. In the sewers, Legoshi understands the Rats' reverence for a boxing rabbit prodigy who makes smaller animals look tough. During a sexual encounter, Louis reveals his emotional unavailability to his fiancé. She surprisingly understands and only desires the marriage for the uniting of two corporate powers, to which Louis agrees. Melon returns to the Shishigumi who, after nearly cutting ties with him, decide to fully embrace him as their boss just as Meat Appreciation Day kicks off in the Black Market.
46	22	"Words That Slipped Out"; Transliteration: "Fu to Deta Kotoba" (Japanese: フと出た言葉)	Daiki Katō	Nanami Higuchi; Shin'ichi Masami	March 7, 2026
Legoshi enters the Meat Appreciation Day turf war between syndicates as an independent in order to face Melon in combat. After confronting his father about the Conglomerate's involvement in the Zoolympics, Louis decides to carve his own path without restraint of family obligations. He then rescues Deshico from Melon's latest murder attempt and is tasked with researching ways to incapacitate the hybrid involving mixing herbivore and carnivore blood to create an overpowering scent. At school, the drama club's set is destroyed in a storm, challenging their resolve.
47	23	"Blood In the Disco Ball"; Transliteration: "Mirror Ball no Naka no Chi" (Japanese: ミラーボールの中の血)	Makoto Sokuza	Nanami Higuchi; Shin'ichi Masami	March 7, 2026
Louis discovers his father is being threatened by the mayor, who seems to be controlling every aspect of city surveillance and appearance. Because of this, he decides against using the mixed blood research and confront the mayor head-on. At the Black Market, proceedings for the festival begin when Melon kills his own lion, starting a massive brawl between every species there. Legoshi faces a Komodo dragon of the Dokugumi, whose severed tail is left to Legoshi with an explosive device attached.
48	24	"Interspecies Exchange"; Transliteration: "Ishuzoku Kouryuu" (Japanese: 異種族交流)	Daiki Katō	Nanami Higuchi; Shin'ichi Masami	March 7, 2026
Legoshi protects the severed tail from the explosion, earning the respect of the Dokugumi. Melon attacks and they brawl all around the Market. As Melon has the upper hand, Chloe appears, disregarding Louis's dismissal of the idea, and releases the mixed species blood aroma. The syndicate leaders disavow Melon's sacrilege of the event, causing him to attempt suicide, but not before hinting at the release of Deshico's coffee-based hyperdrug. At the Zoolympics announcement at the Meteor Festival, when the mayor tricks Louis into revealing the demolition of the Black Market, Louis pushes back, revealing the mayor's blackmailing and scheming. The mayor nervously drinks from his spiked water bottle and goes on a rampage. Legoshi arrives, incapacitates the mayor, and is cleared of his name by Yahya. The mayor is arrested, while the drama club's play goes perfectly and Melon is under hospital arrest. Haru and Legoshi finally kiss and become a couple.

== Home media ==
Season 1

Vol.	Date	Discs	Episodes
1	March 20, 2020	1	1–3
2	April 15, 2020	1	4–6
3	May 20, 2020	1	7–9
4	June 17, 2020	1	10–12

Season 2

Vol.	Date	Discs	Episodes
1	June 23, 2021	1	13–15
2	July 21, 2021	1	16–18
3	August 18, 2021	1	19–21
4	September 22, 2021	1	22–24
