= Lost in Paradise (ALI song) =

- Single and CD edition cover

Single by ALI featuring Aklo

from the album Music World
- Language: Japanese; English
- Released: November 25, 2020
- Recorded: 2020
- Genre: J-pop; Jazz
- Length: 5:27
- Label: Mastersix Foundation
- Songwriters: Leo; Aklo; Alex; Luthfi
- Producers: ALI; Aklo

ALI featuring Aklo singles chronology
"Wild Side" (2019)	"Lost in Paradise" (2020)	"Never Say Goodbye" (2021)

"Lost in Paradise" (stylised in all caps) is a song by Japanese band ALI released as the ending theme for the anime series Jujutsu Kaisen. It features Japanese rapper Aklo, who co-wrote the song with Leo, Alex and Luthfi. It has two editions: the CD edition and the DVD limited edition.

== Background and release ==
Following their last release with "Wild Side" in 2019, the band released "Lost in Paradise" as the ending theme for the anime series Jujutsu Kaisen and it features rapper Aklo. ALI's member Leo wrote:

In the 1990s, I chose Weekly Shonen Jump because I wanted to grow up. I read while skipping school. Before I knew it, more than 20 years have passed. My favorite series, Jujutsu Kaisen, describes the city I grew up in, the city where ALI was born, Shibuya, in the craziest way. The joy of being involved as ED song with the best characters. I wrote the song while expressing my gratitude over the years for being raised by Jump. hope you enjoy it.

— Leo

It was released on October 10, 2020, prior to the CD release. The music video and uncredited version of the ending were released the following day. Following Kahadio's arrest on May 14, 2021, measures were taken to suspend sales, withdraw the song, suspend its digital distribution and keep the video clip private. Six months later, distribution of the song was resumed and a new re-edited version of the music video was released. As of February 2023, it has more than 20 million views.

== Track listing ==
Lost in Paradise – Single
No.	Title	Lyrics	Music	Arrangement	Length
1.	"Lost in Paradise" (featuring Aklo)	Leo; Aklo; Alex; Luthfi	ALI; Aklo	ALI	5:27

Lost in Paradise – CD edition
No.	Title	Lyrics	Music	Arrangement	Length
1.	"Lost in Paradise" (featuring Aklo)	Leo; Aklo; Alex; Luthfi	ALI; Aklo	ALI	5:27
2.	"Moonbeams Satellite" (featuring Kanta)	Leo; ALI; Kanta	ALI; Kanta	ALI	4:22
3.	"Desperado" (featuring J-Rexxx)	Leo; J-Rexxx; Luthfi	ALI; J-Rexxx	ALI	5:39
4.	"Faith" (featuring Namichie and Gomess)	Leo; Namichie; Luthfi	ALI; Namichie	ALI	5:47

Lost in Paradise – DVD limited edition
No.	Title	Length
1.	"ALI presents -JUNGLE LOVE- (part.1) 2020.8.23 LIVE STREAM"

== Charts ==
Chart performance for "Lost in Paradise"
Chart (2020)	Peak position
Japan (Japan Hot 100)	44
Japan (Oricon)	28

== Awards and nominations ==
Awards and nominations for "Lost in Paradise"
Ceremony	Year	Award	Result	Ref.
5th Crunchyroll Anime Awards	2020	Best Ending Sequence	Won	
