= Chessboard / Nichijō =

2023 song by Higedan

"Chessboard/日常"

Single by Official Hige Dandism
- Genre: J-pop

“Chessboard / Nichijō” is the sixth single by Japanese band Official Hige Dandism, released on September 13, 2023, by IRORI Records under Pony Canyon.

It follows their previous single “TATTOO” by five months and marks their first CD single release in two and a half years since “Universe”. This is the band's first double A-side single.

Preceding the single release, “Chessboard” was released digitally on August 9, 2023. “Nichijou” was also released as a digital-only single on September 13.

== Background and production ==
=== Chessboard ===
The song title was inspired by the black and white pattern on a chessboard, symbolizing the good and bad aspects of life. Regarding the lyrics, Fujiwara wrote them while reflecting on his own rebellious middle school self, determined not to lie to that version of himself. He expressed, "I didn't want to sing 'A bright future awaits you.' I want people to sing it happily, but I don't want them to face the rest of their lives clinging only to superficial hope. Yet I don't want them to despair either.“ This sentiment is embedded within the song. The idea of ”having a main theme melody and repeating it" existed around the time production finished on the 2021 album ‘Editorial’. The song was crafted through repeated rewrites of both lyrics and melody.

On October 10, 2022, it was announced that Official Hige Dandism would compose the compulsory piece for the junior high school division of the 90th NHK All-Japan School Choir Competition, a choral competition held from October 7 to 9, 2023.

On March 1, 2023, it was announced that the title of the newly created song is “Chessboard” and that it would receive its premiere broadcast on NHK Educational TV's “N-Con 90th Anniversary! Start Special” on April 8 of the same year. During the program, the NHK Tokyo Children's Choir performed the song, and a message from Fujiwara, who wrote the lyrics and composed the music, was also broadcast. Composer Junko Yokoyama handled the choral arrangement for the song.

On July 3, 2023, it was announced that the band version of “Chessboard” had been selected as the song for NHK's “Minna no Uta” for August and September of that year.
