= Pretender (Official Hige Dandism song) =

2019 song by Official Hige Dandism

Single by Official Hige Dandism

from the album Traveler
- Language: Japanese
- B-side: "Amazing"
- Released: May 15, 2019
- Recorded: 2019
- Genre: J-pop
- Label: Pony Canyon
- Songwriter: Satoshi Fujihara

Official Hige Dandism singles chronology
"Stand by You" (2018)	"Pretender" (2019)	"Shukumei" (2019)

Audio sample
- file; help

Music video
- "Pretender" on YouTube "Pretender" (Acoustic ver.) on YouTube

"Pretender" is a song recorded by Japanese band Official Hige Dandism, released on May 15, 2019, through Pony Canyon in physical single format to serve as the theme song of the 2019 film The Confidence Man JP. Upon release, it was a commercial success, and spent seven weeks at number one on the Billboard Japan Hot 100 and thirty-four weeks at number one on the streaming chart, breaking the record held by "Marigold".

== Composition and lyrics ==
The song is written by vocalist/pianist Satoshi Fujihara and composed in the key of A-flat major and is set in time signature of common time with a tempo of 92 BPM. "Pretender" features a piano, guitar, electric bass, and drums. Begins with melodic guitar arpeggios, the song is described as a sad love song about a man who thinks he is not worthy to fall in love with the woman he likes, and saying 'goodbye' as an expression of giving up.

== Music video ==
The video of "Pretender" was released on April 16, 2019, and directed by Takuto Shimpo. It was filmed in Taipei, showing the band performing with the night view of Taipei as the background, while theatrical scenes of local Taiwanese models and actors are inter-cut in between. On May 22, 2019, the video for the acoustic version of the song was released. It was directed by Yoshiaki Muto, features the band performing with the night view of Tokyo as the background. As of October 2025, "Pretender" has over 500 million views on YouTube, became their most viewed music video, while the acoustic version has over 8 million views on YouTube.

== Track listing ==
All tracks are written by Satoshi Fujihara

"Pretender" track listing
No.	Title	Length
1.	"Pretender"	5:26
2.	"Amazing"	3:51
3.	"Pretender" (acoustic version)	3:43

== Personnel ==
- Words, music and programming: Satoshi Fujihara
- Arrangement: Official Hige Dandism
- Vocal and piano: Satoshi Fujihara
- Guitar and chorus: Daisuke Ozasa
- Bass and chorus: Makoto Narazaki
- Drums and chorus: Masaki Matsuura
- Guitar technician: Tatsuya Mochiduki (Innovator Associates Inc.)
- Drums technician: Genki Wada
- Recorded and mixed by Masahito Komori
- Mastered by Ted Jensen (at Sterling Sound)

== Charts ==
=== Weekly charts ===
2019 weekly chart performance of "Pretender"
Chart (2019)	Peak position
Japan Weekly Singles (Oricon)	9
Japan Hot 100 (Billboard)	1

2025–2026 weekly chart performance of "Pretender"
Chart (2025–2026)	Peak position
South Korea (Circle)	62

=== Year-end charts ===
Year-end chart performance of "Pretender"
Chart (2019)	Position
Japan Hot 100 (Billboard)	3
Tokyo (Tokio Hot 100)	1
Chart (2020)	Position
Japan Hot 100 (Billboard)	2
Chart (2021)	Position
Japan Hot 100 (Billboard)	20
Chart (2022)	Position
Japan Hot 100 (Billboard)	26
Chart (2023)	Position
Japan Hot 100 (Billboard)	44
Chart (2024)	Position
Japan Hot 100 (Billboard)	53
Chart (2025)	Position
Japan Hot 100 (Billboard)	61
South Korea (Circle)	164

=== All-time charts ===
All-time chart performance for "Pretender"
Chart (2008–2022)	Position
Japan (Japan Hot 100)	3

== Certifications ==
Region	Certification	Certified units/sales
Digital download
Japan (RIAJ)	Million	1,000,000^{*}
Streaming
Japan (RIAJ)	Diamond	500,000,000^{†}
^{*} Sales figures based on certification alone.^{†} Streaming-only figures based on certification alone.

== Awards ==
Year	Ceremony	Award	Result
2019	2019 MTV Video Music Awards Japan	Song of the Year	Won
2020	Space Shower Music Awards	Song of the Year	Won
2020	34th Japan Gold Disc Award	Best 5 Songs by Download	Won
2021	39th JASRAC Awards	Domestic Works	Silver Award

== Covers ==
- Peaky P-key did a cover of the song for the game D4DJ Groovy Mix.
- In 2019, Pentatonix covered the song on their PTX Japan 5th Anniversary Greatest Hits album.
- YESUNG, one of the main vocalists of legendary K-Pop group Super Junior, covered the song in SMTOWN LIVE 2024: SMCU PALACE @TOKYO
- millsage did a cover of the song for the game BanG Dream! Our Notes.
