= Traveler (Official Hige Dandism album) =

Studio album by Official Hige Dandism
- Released: 9 October 2019
- Recorded: 2018
- Genres: J-pop, pop rock
- Length: 55:23
- Label: Pony Canyon
- Producer: Official Hige Dandism

Official Hige Dandism chronology
Escaparade (2018)	Traveler (2019)	Editorial (2021)

Singles from Traveler
- 1. "Stand by You" Released: October 17, 2018; 2. "Pretender" Released: May 15, 2019; 3. "Shukumei" Released: June 31, 2019

Traveler is the debut studio album by Japanese band Official Hige Dandism, released on 9 October 2019. Supported by the singles "Shukumei" and "Pretender", it peaked at No. 1 on the Oricon Albums Chart, becoming the band’s first album to do so.

== Background ==
In 2018, Official Hige Dandism was signed to the record label Pony Canyon, releasing the single "No Doubt" on 11 April of that year. The band recorded and released "Pretender" on 15 May 2019. The single subsequently topped the Billboard Japan Hot 100.

Before the album’s release, the band released "Shukumei" (宿命), which peaked at No. 3 on the same chart.

== Composition ==
The album incorporates elements of Soul, Jazz and Adult contemporary music. While the music of their previous album was more experimental, the album focused on a more cohesive sound, also blending EDM and trap.

Its first track, "Yesterday", which was composed by Yoshikazu Tsutaya, takes influence from gospel.

== Singles ==
Three singles were released from the album, "Pretender" being its most successful, charting at number 1 for seven weeks on the Billboard Japan Hot 100 and thirty-four at number one on the streaming charts.

== Reception ==
A review from news site Real Sound, was positive, praising the incorporation of various genres and the albums consistency, stating “It features popular tracks, isn’t too heavy as a whole, and, as a record that lets listeners envision both the band’s past and future, it’s a work worthy of propelling them to stardom”.

== Track listing ==
No.	Title	Length
1.	"Yesterday (イエスタデイ)"	4:59
2.	"Shukumei (宿命)"	4:40
3.	"Amazing"	3:51
4.	"Rowan"	4:44
5.	"Bad for Me (バッドフォーミー)"	3:55
6.	"Saigo no Koiwazurai (最後の恋煩い)"	4:33
7.	"Vintage (ビンテージ)"	4:12
8.	"Stand by You"	4:16
9.	"Fire Ground"	3:43
10.	"Tabi wa Michizure (旅は道連れ)"	3:15
11.	"052519"	0:10
12.	"Pretender"	5:26
13.	"Last Song (ラストソング)"	5:53
14.	"Travelers"	1:46
Total length:		55:23

== Charts ==
Weekly Charts
Chart (2019)	Peak position	Ref.
Billboard Japan Hot Albums	1	
Billboard Japan Top Album Sales	1	
Billboard Japan Download Albums	1	
Oricon Weekly Album Charts	1	
Oricon Weekly Digital Albums	1	
Oricon Weekly Combined Albums	1	

Year-end Charts
Chart (2019)	Peak position	Ref.
Billboard Japan Hot Albums	15	
Billboard Japan Download Albums	11	
Oricon Yearly Albums	1	

== Accolades ==
Year	Ceremony	Result	Ref.
2020	13th CD Shop Awards	Won	

== Certifications ==
Region	Certification	Certified untis/sales
Japan (RIAJ)	2x Platinum	470,000

== Release history ==
Date	Edition(s)	Format(s)	Label	Ref.
September 11, 2019	Digital Download	Standard	Pony Canyon	
October 9, 2019	CD	Standard	Pony Canyon	

== Personnel ==
Adapted from liner notes.

- Satoshi Fujiwara: Vocals, Piano, Additional Drums (Track #3), Programming (Track #3, 5–9, 12–14)
- Daisuke Kozasa: Guitar, Backing Vocals, Vocals (Track #10)
- Makoto Narasaki: Bass, Backing Vocals, Vocals (Track #10), Tenor Saxophone (Tracks #5, 9), Programming (Track #10)
- Masaki Matsuura: Drums, Backing Vocals, Voice (Track #10)
- Yoshiichi Tsutaya: Programming, All Other Instruments (Tracks #1, 2)
- Numashou: Percussion (Tracks #6, 10)
- Andy Wulf: Saxophone, Flute (Tracks #6, 13)
- Atsuki Yumoto: Trumpet (Tracks #2, 5, 6, 9, 13)
- Toshihiro Kawashima: Trombone (Tracks #6, 13)
- Daisuke Kadowaki Strings: Strings (Track #1)
- Rodi Boy & Rodi Girl: All Other Sound Effects (Track #10)
