= Cry Baby (Official Hige Dandism song) =

Single by Official Hige Dandism

from the album Editorial
- Released: May 7, 2021
- Genre: J-pop; anime song
- Label: Irori Records
- Composer: Satoshi Fujihara
- Lyricist: Satoshi Fujihara
- Producer: Official Hige Dandism

Official Hige Dandism singles chronology
"Universe" (2021)	"Cry Baby" (2021)	"Anarchy" (2022)

Audio sample
- file; help

Music video
- "Cry Baby" on YouTube

"Cry Baby" is a song by Japanese band Official Hige Dandism, released as a digital single on May 7, 2021. The song was used as the opening theme song to the first season of the anime adaptation of Tokyo Revengers.

== Background and release ==
The full version of "Cry Baby" was first played on April 24, 2021, on the FM802 radio program Lantern Jam Times. The song was later released digitally on May 7, 2021. It was used as the opening theme song to the anime adaptation of Tokyo Revengers, which was broadcast from April 11 to September 19, 2021.

To promote "Cry Baby", throughout July and August 2021, Official Hige Dandism performed the song on the music shows The Music Day, the 2021 FNS Music Festival, Ongaku no Hi, and CDTV Live! Live!

== Music video ==
The music video was directed by Takuto Shimpo and depicts the members of the band playing their instruments in a junkyard. A teaser for the music video was released on May 3, 2021.

== Reception ==
In May 2021, "Cry Baby" reached 22,068 downloads. In September 2021, "Cry Baby" was certified Platinum by the Recording Industry Association of Japan.

In November 2021, "Cry Baby" reached No. 4 on the Billboard Japan Hot 100. It also reached No. 1 on the Billboard Japan Hot Animation for three consecutive weeks. In addition, it reached No. 1 on the karaoke charts, No. 2 on video views, No. 5 on the download charts, and No. 6 on the radio charts. In December 2021, "Cry Baby" had been streamed over 2 million times. Karaoke chain Joysound reported that "Cry Baby" was the second most requested anime song of 2021.

The music video for "Cry Baby" won Video of the Year and Best Group Video in the Japan category at the 2021 MTV Video Music Awards Japan.

== Charts ==
=== Weekly charts ===
Chart (2021)	Peak position
Global 200 (Billboard)	114
Japan (Japan Hot 100)	4
Japan Hot Animation (Billboard Japan)	1

=== Year-end charts ===
Chart (2021)	Position
Japan (Japan Hot 100)	13
Japan Hot Animation (Billboard Japan)	5

Chart (2022)	Position
Japan (Japan Hot 100)	17
Japan Hot Animation (Billboard Japan)	6

Chart (2023)	Position
Japan (Japan Hot 100)	77

== Sales and certifications ==
Region	Certification	Certified units/sales
Japan Digital	—	276,716
Japan (RIAJ) Streaming	Diamond	500,000,000^{†}
^{†} Streaming-only figures based on certification alone.

== Awards ==
Award Ceremony	Year	Category	Result	Ref.
Crunchyroll Anime Awards	2022	Best Opening Sequence	Nominated	
MTV Video Music Awards Japan	2021	Best Video of the Year	Won	
MTV Video Music Awards Japan	2021	Best Group Video (Japan)	Won	
Japan Gold Disc Award	2022	Best 5 Songs by Streaming	Won	
Japan Gold Disc Award	2022	Best 5 Songs by Downloads	Won	

== Cover versions ==
The official YouTube channel for the anime adaptation of Tokyo Revengers released a video of Mikey's voice actor, Yū Hayashi, performing a cover of "Cry Baby" on October 11, 2021.
