= Official Hige Dandism =

Japanese pop band

- Origin: Shimane, Japan
- Genre: Pop rock
- Years active: 2012–present
- Labels: Lastrum (2015–2018); Pony Canyon (2018–2020); Irori Records (2020–present)
- Members: Satoshi Fujihara; Daisuke Ozasa; Makoto Narazaki; Masaki Matsuura
- Website: higedan.com

Official Hige Dandism (Japanese: Official髭男dism; 'Manly Moustache', or 'Macho Moustache' (Note: Hige (髭) translates to facial hair but mostly moustache, and Dandism (男dism) refers to Manly of man, commonly used in advertising to suggest manliness.), stylized as Official HIGE DANdism), commonly abbreviated Higedan (ヒゲダン), is a pop rock band formed in Shimane, Japan in 2012.

After signing a record deal with the major label Pony Canyon in 2018, Official Hige Dandism released the debut single No Doubt, the lead single from the extended play, Stand by You EP. The following year, the band released the second single, "Pretender", which ranked at number three on the year-end chart of Billboard Japan Hot 100 in 2019. Their debut studio album Traveler was released on 9 October 2019 and reached number one on the Japan Albums Chart.

== Members ==
- Satoshi Fujihara (藤原 聡) – lead vocals, keyboards, drums, percussion, occasional guitar (2012–present)
- Daisuke Ozasa (小笹 大輔) – guitar, occasional percussion, backing vocals (2012–present)
- Makoto Narazaki (楢﨑 誠) – bass guitar, synthesizer, saxophone, backing vocals (2012–present)
- Masaki Matsuura (松浦 匡希) – drums, percussion, backing vocals (2012–present)

== History ==
The band Official Hige Dandism was formed on June 7, 2012. They released their indie debut mini album "Love to Peace wa kimi no naka (ラブとピースは君の中)" on April 22, 2015. Their major debut single "No Doubt (ノーダウト)" was released on April 11, 2018.

On May 15, 2019, the hit song "Pretender" was released. In October, after their live performance on the popular program Music Station, the song topped the Japan Hot 100. That same year, the band released "Shukumei" (宿命) as the official song of the tv broadcast for the 101st edition of the National High School Baseball Championship.

On September 4, 2019, Abema TV announced that Official Hige Dandism would be producing the song "Break it Down" for Airi Suzuki's second album. They attended the 70th NHK Kōhaku Uta Gassen on December 31, 2019 with the song "Pretender".

The band again attended the 71st NHK Kōhaku Uta Gassen on December 31, 2020, performing the song "I Love...".

On March 12, 2021, it was announced that the band provided the opening theme song "Cry Baby" for the anime Tokyo Revengers, premiering in April 2021. On March 17, 2022, they announced the opening theme song "Mixed Nuts" for the anime Spy × Family, also premiering in April 2022.

In 2023, Official Hige Dandism provided the opening theme song "White Noise" for the second season of Tokyo Revengers.

The band announced on March 11, 2023 that it would be on temporary hiatus while Fujihara underwent medical treatment and recovery for a vocal cord polyp.

On September 7, 2024, it was announced that the band provided the opening theme song "Same Blue" for the anime Blue Box, which premiered in October 2024.

== Discography ==
=== Studio albums ===
List of studio albums, with selected details, chart positions, sales and certifications
Title	Details	Peak chart positions		Sales	Certifications
Title	Details	JPN	JPN Hot	Sales	Certifications
Escaparade (エスカパレード)	Released: April 11, 2018; Label: Lastrum Music Entertainment; Formats: CD, CD+DVD, digital download, streaming	15	13		
Traveler	Released: October 9, 2019; Label: Pony Canyon; Formats: CD, CD+DVD, CD+Blu-ray, digital download, streaming	1	1	JPN: 444,359 (Note: Combined sales figures for Traveler: 189,331 (2019); 255,028 (2020))	RIAJ: 2× Platinum (phy.); Gold (dig.)
Editorial	Released: August 18, 2021; Label: Irori Records; Formats: CD, CD+DVD, CD+Blu-ray, digital download, streaming	1	1	JPN: 240,511 (Note: Combined sales figures for Editorial: 211,140 (physical); 29,371 (digital))	RIAJ: Platinum (phy.)
Rejoice	Released: July 24, 2024; Label: Irori Records; Formats: CD, CD+DVD, CD+Blu-ray, digital download, streaming	2	2	JPN: 95,689	RIAJ: Gold (phy.)

=== Live albums ===
List of live albums, with selected details and chart positions
Title	Details	Peak chart positions	
Title	Details	JPN	JPN Hot
Official Hige Dandism One-Man Tour 2019 @ Nippon Budokan	Released: February 2, 2020; Label: Pony Canyon; Formats: CD, digital download	10	13
Official Hige Dandism Online Live 2020: Arena Travelers	Released: August 18, 2021; Label: Irori, Pony Canyon; Formats: Digital download	—	34
Official Hige Dandism One-Man Tour 2021–2022: Editorial @ Saitama Super Arena	Released: October 5, 2022; Label: Irori Records; Formats: CD, digital download	13	12
Official Hige Dandism Arena Tour 2024: Rejoice	Released: December 10, 2025; Label: Irori Records; Formats: CD, digital download	20	33
Official Hige Dandism Live at Stadium 2025	Released: July 15, 2026; Label: Irori Records; Formats: CD, digital download	17	—
"—" denotes releases that did not chart.

=== Extended plays ===
List of extended plays, with selected details, chart positions, sales and certifications
Title	Details	Peak chart positions		Sales	Certifications
Title	Details	JPN (Note: Love to Peace wa Kimi no Naka, Man in the Mirror and Report are marked as mini-album and charted in Oricon Albums Chart, while What's Going On?, Stand by You EP and Hello EP are marked as extended play and charted in Oricon Singles Chart.)	JPN Hot	Sales	Certifications
Love to Peace wa Kimi no Naka (ラブとピースは君の中)	Released: April 22, 2015; Label: Lastrum Music Entertainment; Formats: CD, digital download, streaming	181	80		
Man in the Mirror	Released: June 15, 2016; Label: Lastrum Music Entertainment; Formats: CD, digital download, streaming	136	64		
What's Going On?	Released: November 2, 2016; Label: Lastrum Music Entertainment; Formats: CD, CD+DVD, digital download, streaming	105	—		
Report (レポート)	Released: April 19, 2017; Label: Lastrum Music Entertainment; Formats: CD, digital download, streaming	81	—		
Lady	Released: October 13, 2017; Label: Lastrum Music Entertainment; Formats: Digital download, streaming	—	52		
Stand by You EP	Released: October 17, 2018; Label: Pony Canyon; Formats: CD, CD+DVD, digital download, streaming	17	—		
Hello EP	Released: August 5, 2020; Label: Irori Records; Formats: CD, CD+DVD, digital download, streaming	2	—		RIAJ: Gold (phy.)
Mixed Nuts EP (ミックスナッツ EP)	Released: June 22, 2022; Label: Irori Records; Formats: CD, CD+DVD, CD+Blu-ray, digital download, streaming	3	—	JPN: 31,637 (phy.)	
"—" denotes releases that did not chart.

=== Singles ===
List of singles, with selected chart positions, showing year released, certifications and album name
Title	Year	Peak chart positions			Certifications	Album
Title	Year	JPN	JPN Hot	WW	Certifications	Album
"Koi no Saichu!" (恋の最chu!) (with Marina Yamane)	2015	—	—	—		Non-album singles
"Bukiyō na Futari de" (不器用な二人で) (with Marina Yamane)	2015	—	—	—		Non-album singles
"What's Going On?"	2016	105	—	—		Non-album singles
"Tell Me Baby"	2017	—	—	—		Escaparade
"Brothers" (ブラザーズ)	2017	—	—	—		Escaparade
"Lady"	2017	—	—	—		Escaparade
"No Doubt" (ノーダウト)	2018	51	11	—	RIAJ: Platinum (dig.); 3× Platinum (st.)	Escaparade
"Bad for Me" (バッドフォーミー)	2018	—	93	—	RIAJ: Gold (st.)	Traveler
"Stand by You"	2018	17	10	—	RIAJ: Gold (dig.); 2× Platinum (st.)	Traveler
"Pretender"	2019	9	1	— (Note: "Pretender" did not enter the Billboard Global 200, but peaked at number 114 on the Global Excl. US.)	RIAJ: Million (dig.); Diamond (st.)	Traveler
"Shukumei" (宿命)	2019	15	3	—	RIAJ: 2× Platinum (dig.); Diamond (st.)	Traveler
"I Love..."	2020	5	1	— (Note: "I Love..." did not enter the Billboard Global 200, but peaked at number 140 on the Global Excl. US.)	RIAJ: Gold (phy.); Million (dig.); Diamond (st.)	Editorial
"Parabola" (パラボラ)	2020	—	6	—	RIAJ: Gold (dig.); Platinum (st.)	Editorial
"Laughter"	2020	—	10	— (Note: "Laughter" did not enter the Billboard Global 200, but peaked at number 182 on the Global Excl. US.)	RIAJ: Gold (dig.); 2× Platinum (st.)	Editorial
"Hello"	2020	2	4	—	RIAJ: Gold (phy.); Gold (dig.); Platinum (st.)	Editorial
"Universe" (Note: Original soundtrack from Doraemon: Nobita's Little Star Wars 2021.)	2021	3	4	—	RIAJ: Platinum (st.)	Editorial
"Cry Baby"	2021	—	4	114	RIAJ: Diamond (st.)	Editorial
"Anarchy"	2022	—	12	— (Note: "Anarchy" did not enter the Billboard Global 200, but peaked at number 181 on the Global Excl. US.)	RIAJ: Gold (st.)	Rejoice
"Mixed Nuts" (ミックスナッツ)	2022	3	1	61	RIAJ: Platinum (dig.); Diamond (st.)	Rejoice
"Subtitle"	2022	—	1	29	RIAJ: Platinum (dig.); Diamond (st.)	Rejoice
"White Noise" (ホワイトノイズ)	2023	—	5	— (Note: "White Noise" did not enter the Billboard Global 200, but peaked at number 126 on the Global Excl. US.)	RIAJ: Gold (dig.); Platinum (st.)	Rejoice
"Tattoo"	2023	—	6	— (Note: "Tattoo" did not enter the Billboard Global 200, but peaked at number 126 on the Global Excl. US.)	RIAJ: 2× Platinum (st.)	Rejoice
"Chessboard"	2023	6	18	—	RIAJ: Gold (st.)	Rejoice
"Nichijō" (日常)	2023	6	20	—	RIAJ: Gold (st.)	Rejoice
"Soulsoup"	2023	—	12	—	RIAJ: Gold (st.)	Rejoice
"Same Blue"	2024	—	5	—	RIAJ: Platinum (st.)	TBA
"50%"	2024	—	16	—		TBA
"Rashisa" (らしさ)	2025	—	11	—	RIAJ: Platinum (st.)	TBA
"Sanitizer"	2025	—	6	—		TBA
"Make Me Wonder"	2025	—	18	—		TBA
"Elderflower" (エルダーフラワー)	2026	7	11	—		TBA
"Stardust" (スターダスト)	2026	7	7	—		TBA
"—" denotes releases that did not chart or were not released in that territory.

=== Other charted and certified songs ===
List of other charted songs, with selected chart positions, showing year released, certifications and album name
Title	Year	Peak chart positions		Certifications	Album
Title	Year	JPN Hot	WW Excl. US	Certifications	Album
"Koi no Mae Narae" (恋の前ならえ)	2015	93	—		Love to Peace wa Kimi no Naka
"Coffee and Syrup" (コーヒーとシロップ)	2016	94	—		Man in the Mirror
"115man Kilo no Film" (115万キロのフィルム)	2018	11	—		Escaparade
"Fire Ground"	2018	— (Note: "Fire Ground" peaked at number 67 on Billboard Japan Streaming Songs chart.)	—	RIAJ: Gold (st.)	Traveler
"Yesterday" (イエスタデイ)	2019	2	—	RIAJ: Platinum (dig.); 3× Platinum (st.)	Traveler
"Amazing"	2019	— (Note: "Amazing" peaked at number 30 on Billboard Japan Streaming Songs chart.)	—	RIAJ: Gold (st.)	Traveler
"Saigo no Koiwazurai" (最後の恋煩い)	2019	75	—		Traveler
"Vintage" (ビンテージ)	2019	26	—	RIAJ: Platinum (st.)	Traveler
"Apoptosis" (アポトーシス)	2021	8	98	RIAJ: Platinum (st.)	Editorial
"Sharon"	2024	32	—		Rejoice
"—" denotes releases that did not chart or were not released in that territory.

== Videography ==
=== Video albums ===
List of video albums, with selected details and chart positions
Title	Details	Peak chart positions	
Title	Details	JPN DVD	JPN BD
Official Hige Dandism Live Collection 2016-2018 (Official髭男dism LIVE COLLECTION 2016–2018)	Released: June 22, 2019; Label: Pony Canyon; Formats: DVD, Blu-ray	—	—
Official Hige Dandism One-Man Tour 2019 @ Nippon Budokan (Official髭男dism one-man tour 2019@日本武道館)	Released: February 12, 2020; Label: Pony Canyon; Formats: DVD, Blu-ray	2	2
"—" denotes releases that did not chart.

== Awards and nominations ==
Name of the award ceremony, year presented, category, nominee(s) of the award, and the result of the nomination
Award Ceremony	Year	Category	Nominee(s)/work(s)	Result	Ref.
Apple Music Awards	2021	Artist of the Year (Japan)	Official Hige Dandism	Won	
Billboard Japan Music Awards	2019	Top Artist Of The Year	Official Hige Dandism	Shortlisted	
Billboard Japan Music Awards	2019	Hot Animation Of The Year	"Yesterday"	Shortlisted	
Billboard Japan Music Awards	2019	Hot 100 Of The Year	"Shukumei"	Shortlisted	
Billboard Japan Music Awards	2019	Hot 100 Of The Year	"Pretender"	Shortlisted	
Billboard Japan Music Awards	2020	Hot 100 Of The Year	"Pretender"	Shortlisted	
Billboard Japan Music Awards	2020	Hot 100 Of The Year	"I Love..."	Shortlisted	
Billboard Japan Music Awards	2020	Hot 100 Of The Year	"Shukumei"	Shortlisted	
Billboard Japan Music Awards	2020	Hot Album Of The Year	Traveller	Shortlisted	
Billboard Japan Music Awards	2020	Hot Animation Of The Year	"Yesterday"	Shortlisted	
Billboard Japan Music Awards	2020	Top Artist Of The Year	Official Hige Dandism	Won	
Billboard Japan Music Awards	2021	Top Artist Of The Year	Official Hige Dandism	Shortlisted	
Billboard Japan Music Awards	2021	Hot Animation Of The Year	"Universe"	Shortlisted	
Billboard Japan Music Awards	2021	Hot Animation Of The Year	"Cry Baby"	Shortlisted	
Billboard Japan Music Awards	2021	Hot Album Of The Year	Editorial	Shortlisted	
CD Shop Awards	2020	Grand Prize (Red)	Traveller	Won	
CD Shop Awards	2022	Grand Prize (Red)	Editorial	Won	
Crunchyroll Anime Awards	2023	Best Opening Sequence	"Mixed Nuts"	Nominated	
Japan Gold Disc Award	2020	Best 5 Albums – Japanese Music	Traveler	Won	
Japan Gold Disc Award	2020	Special Achievement	Official Hige Dandism	Won	
Japan Gold Disc Award	2020	Best 5 Songs by Downloads	"Pretender"	Won	
Japan Gold Disc Award	2021	Best 5 Songs by Downloads	"I Love..."	Won	
Japan Gold Disc Award	2021	Best 5 Songs by Streaming	"I Love..."	Won	
Japan Gold Disc Award	2021	Song Of The Year by Streaming	"I Love..."	Won	
Japan Gold Disc Award	2021	Song Of The Year by Downloads	"I Love..."	Won	
Japan Gold Disc Award	2022	Best 5 Songs by Streaming	"Cry Baby"	Won	
Japan Gold Disc Award	2022	Best 5 Songs by Downloads	"Cry Baby"	Won	
JASRAC Awards	2021	Domestic Works	"Pretender"	Silver	
Line News Present: News Awards	2019	Artist Of The Year	Official Hige Dandism	Won	
Line Music Annual Rankings	2019	Top Drama/Theme Track	"Pretender"	Won	
Line Music Annual Rankings	2019	Top BGM-Chart Track	"Pretender"	Won	
Line Music Annual Rankings	2019	Top Line Chaku-Uta Track	"Pretender"	Won	
Line Music Annual Rankings	2019	No. 1/Most Loved Song	"Pretender"	Won	
Line Music Annual Rankings	2020	No. 1/Most Loved Song	"I Love..."	Won	
Line Music Annual Rankings	2020	Most Played Artist	Official Hige Dandism	Won	
Mnet Asian Music Awards	2020	Best Asian Artist – Japan	Official Hige Dandism	Won	
MTV Europe Music Awards	2020	Best Japanese Act	Official Hige Dandism	Won	
MTV Video Music Awards Japan	2018	Best New Artist (Video)	"No Doubt"	Won	
MTV Video Music Awards Japan	2019	Song Of The Year	"Pretender"	Won	
MTV Video Music Awards Japan	2019	Artist Of The Year	Official Hige Dandism	Won	
MTV Video Music Awards Japan	2020	Best Group Video – Japan	"I Love..."	Won	
MTV Video Music Awards Japan	2021	Album Of The Year	Editorial	Won	
MTV Video Music Awards Japan	2021	Best Video of the Year	"Cry Baby"	Won	
MTV Video Music Awards Japan	2021	Best Group Video (Japan)	"Cry Baby"	Won	
MTV Video Music Awards Japan	2022	Best Group Video (Japan)	"Mixed Nuts"	Won	
MTV Video Music Awards Japan	2025	Album Of The Year	"Rejoice"	Won	
National Association of Commercial Broadcasters Awards	2021	Excellence Award in Radio Program Division	Rodiura Base	Won	
Space Shower Music Awards	2020	Song Of The Year	"Pretender"	Won	
Space Shower Music Awards	2021	Artist Of The Year	Official Hige Dandism	Won	
Space Shower Music Awards	2021	Best Pop Artist	Official Hige Dandism	Won	
Television Drama Academy Awards	2020	Best Drama Song	"I Love..."	Won	
Tokyo Drama Awards	2020	Best Theme Song	"I Love..."	Won	
V-Air Amaban Grand Prix Tournament	2014	Grand Prix	Official Hige Dandism	Won	
VGP Summer Awards	2021	Blu-ray Disc Planning Award	Universe+Official髭男dism ONLINE LIVE2020～Arena Travelers～	Won	
Yahoo! Search Awards	2020	Person (Musician Category)	Official Hige Dandism	Won	
