= Wild Side (ALI song) =

Single by ALI

from the album Music World
- Language: English; Japanese
- Released: November 27, 2019
- Genre: J-pop; jazz; Anison
- Length: 2:38
- Label: Mastersix Foundation
- Songwriter(s): Leo Imamura; Jua
- Producer(s): ALI

ALI singles chronology
"Wild Side" (2019)	"Lost in Paradise" (2020)

"Wild Side" is a song recorded by ALI, a multinational band based in Japan. The song was released on November 27, 2019, and serves as the theme song for Japanese anime Beastars.

== Track listing ==
All music is composed by ALI.

No.	Title	Length
1.	"Wild Side"	2:38
2.	"Jungle Love"	3:09
3.	"Jungle Love" (instrumental)	3:09
4.	"Wild Side" (instrumental)	2:38

== Charts ==
Weekly chart performance for "Wild Side"
Chart (2019)	Peak position
Japan Combined Singles (Oricon)	113
