= MTV Video Music Award Japan for Best Group Video =

Annual Japanese music award

- Awarded for: Group music videos
- Country: Japan
- Presented by: MTV Japan
- First award: 2002

Highlights
- Most awards: Official Hige Dandism (3)
- Most nominations: The Black Eyed Peas (4)
- Website: Official website

The MTV Video Music Award Japan for Best Group Video (最優秀グループビデオ賞) is an annual award given by MTV Japan since 2002.

== Results ==
The following table displays the nominees and the winners in bold print with a yellow background.

=== 2000s ===
| Year | Group | Video |
|---|---|---|
| **2002** (1st) | **Backstreet Boys** | |
| **2002** (1st) | Dragon Ash | |
| **2002** (1st) | Glay | |
| **2002** (1st) | Mr. Children | |
| **2002** (1st) | U2 | |
| **2003** (2nd) | **Rip Slyme** | **"Rakuen Baby" (楽園ベイベー)** |
| **2003** (2nd) | Blue | "One Love" |
| **2003** (2nd) | Bon Jovi | "Everyday" |
| **2003** (2nd) | Mr. Children | "Hero" |
| **2003** (2nd) | Oasis | "Little By Little" |
| **2004** (3rd) | **Kick The Can Crew** | **"Saga Continue"** |
| **2004** (3rd) | The Black Eyed Peas | "Where Is the Love?" |
| **2004** (3rd) | Blue | "Guilty" |
| **2004** (3rd) | Dragon Ash | "Morrow" |
| **2004** (3rd) | Rip Slyme | "Joint" |
| **2005** (4th) | **Linkin Park** | **"Breaking The Habit"** |
| **2005** (4th) | Asian Kung-Fu Generation | "Kimi no Machi Made" (君の街まで) |
| **2005** (4th) | Destiny's Child | "Lose My Breath" |
| **2005** (4th) | Exile | "Carry On" |
| **2005** (4th) | Orange Range | "Locolotion" |
| **2006** (5th) | **Def Tech** | **"Konomama"** |
| **2006** (5th) | The Black Eyed Peas | "Don't Phunk With My Heart" |
| **2006** (5th) | Oasis | "Lyla" |
| **2006** (5th) | Orange Range | "Kizuna" (キズナ) |
| **2006** (5th) | Tokyo Incidents | "Shuraba" (修羅場) |
| **2007** (6th) | **Exile** | **"Lovers Again"** |
| **2007** (6th) | Glay | "100 Mankai No Kiss" (100万回のKiss) |
| **2007** (6th) | My Chemical Romance | "Welcome to the Black Parade" |
| **2007** (6th) | Red Hot Chili Peppers | "Dani California" |
| **2007** (6th) | Remioromen | "Stand By Me" |
| **2008** (7th) | **M-Flo Loves Emi Hinouchi, Ryohei, Emyli, Yoshika and Lisa** | **"Love Comes and Goes"** |
| **2008** (7th) | Maroon 5 | "Makes Me Wonder" |
| **2008** (7th) | Mr. Children | "Irodori" (彩り) |
| **2008** (7th) | Rip Slyme | "I.N.G" |
| **2008** (7th) | Sum 41 | "Underclass Hero" |
| **2009** (8th) | **Exile** | **"Ti Amo (Chapter2)"** |
| **2009** (8th) | Franz Ferdinand | "Ulysses" |
| **2009** (8th) | The Killers | "Human" |
| **2009** (8th) | Shōnan no Kaze | "Koishigure" (恋時雨) |
| **2009** (8th) | Tohoshinki | "Jumon ~Mirotic~" (呪文 ~Mirotic~) |

=== 2010s ===
| Year | Group | Video |
|---|---|---|
| **2010** (9th) | **Tohoshinki** | **"Share the World"** |
| **2010** (9th) | Backstreet Boys | "Straight Through My Heart" |
| **2010** (9th) | The Black Eyed Peas | "I Gotta Feeling" |
| **2010** (9th) | Remioromen | "Kachōfūgetsu" (花鳥風月) |
| **2010** (9th) | Tokyo Incidents | "Nōdōteki Sanpunkan" (能動的三分間) |
| **2011** (10th) | **Girls' Generation** | **"Tell Me Your Wish (Genie)"** |
| **2011** (10th) | The Black Eyed Peas | "The Time (Dirty Bit)" |
| **2011** (10th) | Ikimono-gakari | "Arigatō" (ありがとう) |
| **2011** (10th) | Linkin Park | "The Catalyst" |
| **2011** (10th) | W-inds | "Let's Get It On" |
| **2012** (11th) | **2PM** | **"I'm Your Man"** |
| **2012** (11th) | Coldplay | "Paradise" |
| **2012** (11th) | Ikimonogakari | "Itsudatte Bokura Wa" (いつだって僕らは) |
| **2012** (11th) | Maroon 5 featuring Christina Aguilera | "Moves Like Jagger" |
| **2012** (11th) | Monkey Majik | "Hero" |
| **2013** (12th) | **Sandaime J Soul Brothers from Exile Tribe** | **"Hanabi" (花火)"** |
| **2013** (12th) | Fun featuring Janelle Monáe | "We Are Young" |
| **2013** (12th) | Maroon 5 featuring Wiz Khalifa | "Payphone" |
| **2013** (12th) | One Direction | "What Makes You Beautiful" |
| **2013** (12th) | Tohoshinki | "Catch Me -If you wanna-" |
| **2014** (13th) | **Momoiro Clover Z** | **"Gounn"** |
| **2014** (13th) | Ikimonogakari | "Egao" |
| **2014** (13th) | One Direction | "Story of My Life" |
| **2014** (13th) | J Soul Brothers III | "So Right" |
| **2014** (13th) | Thirty Seconds to Mars | "Up in the Air" |
| **2016** (15th) | **International Group** | |
| **2016** (15th) | **Fifth Harmony** | "Work From Home ft.Ty Dolla $ign" |
| **2016** (15th) | Coldplay | "Up & Up" |
| **2016** (15th) | Pentatonix | "Can't Sleep Love" |
| **2016** (15th) | The 1975 | "UGH!" |
| **2016** (15th) | The Vamps | Wake Up |
| **2016** (15th) | **Japanese Group** | |
| **2016** (15th) | **Exile The Second** | **"Shut up!! Shut up!! Shut up!!"** |
| **2016** (15th) | Babymetal | "Karate" |
| **2016** (15th) | Perfume | "Flash" |
| **2016** (15th) | Vamps | "Inside of Me Ft.Chris Motionless of Motionless In White" |
| **2016** (15th) | The Yellow Monkey | "Alright" |
| **2017** (16th) | Momoiro Clover Z | "Blast!" |
| **2018** (17th) | Keyakizaka46 | "Ambivalent" |
| **2019** (18th) | Keyakizaka46 | "Kuroi Hitsuji" |

=== 2020s ===
| Year | Category | Group | Video |
|---|---|---|---|
| **2020** (19th) | Japan | Official Hige Dandism | "I Love..." |
| **2020** (19th) | International | BTS | "Dynamite" |
| **2021** (20th) | Japan | Official Hige Dandism | "Cry Baby" |
| **2021** (20th) | International | BTS | "Butter" |
| **2022** (21st) | Japan | Official Hige Dandism | "Mixed Nuts" |
| **2022** (21st) | International | Blackpink | "Pink Venom" |
| **2023** (22nd) | Japan | Nogizaka46 | "Ohitorisama Tengoku" |
| **2023** (22nd) | International | Stray Kids | "Case 143" |

== See also ==
- MTV Video Music Award for Best Group Video
- MTV Europe Music Award for Best Group
