= Mixed Nuts (song) =

Single by Official Hige Dandism

from the album Rejoice
- Released: April 15, 2022
- Studio: Bunkamura Studio
- Genre: J-pop; jazz; pop rock
- Length: 3:33
- Label: Irori
- Composer: Satoshi Fujihara
- Lyricist: Satoshi Fujihara

Official Hige Dandism singles chronology
| "Anarchy" (2022) | "Mixed Nuts" (2022) | "Subtitle" (2022) |

Audio sample
- file; help

Music video
- "Mixed Nuts" on YouTube

"Mixed Nuts" (Japanese: ミックスナッツ, Hepburn: Mikkusu Nattsu) is a song recorded by Japanese band Official Hige Dandism, released digitally on April 15, 2022, through Irori Records label. The song was featured as the opening theme song for the anime series Spy × Family. It peaked at number one on the Japan Hot 100 and number 61 on the Billboard Global 200. The Mixed Nuts EP was released on June 22, 2022.

== Composition and lyrics ==
"Mixed Nuts" is a jazz and pop rock song, composed in the key of F-sharp major and is set in time signature of common time with a tempo of 150 BPM, runs for three minutes and 33 seconds. It was composed and written by vocalist Satoshi Fujihara for the anime Spy × Family, with the family theme in mind, as well as main character Anya's love for peanuts. "I once heard Anya say that she liked peanuts. I suddenly thought of peanuts in the mixed nuts that I often eat myself and looked them up, and found that although they look similar, nuts that grow from trees and peanuts that grow under the ground are classified as two different kinds, and that peanuts are really a different kind, despite their appearance." He later stated, "I felt that this was the theme of this work, that there is something interesting about playing a fake family while hiding one's true identity and confronting something like a real family, and that the happiness and joy that comes to you is all that matters, rather than whether it is genuine or not. I created this work with the original in mind."

== Music video ==
The music video for "Mixed Nuts" was released on April 15, 2022, the same day as the single released, and directed by Takuto Shimpo.

The music video depicts a family of three entering a hotel during a storm. As the song begins, the hotel is struck by lightning, and the mother and father mysteriously vanish. As the daughter searches the hotel, she encounters the band members dressed as film noir investigators, who open up a metal box to reveal a bomb wired to a timer. Meanwhile, the mother and father have reappeared, and band members dressed in hazmat suits give them a pair of pliers to cut the wire to the bomb, but that only causes it to tick down faster. Fleeing through the hotel, the parents and daughter are reunited with each other in a large ballroom, and they hug in relief. As the lights come on, the family watches the band perform "Mixed Nuts" on a stage. During the closing notes of the song, the band hand a gift-wrapped box to the daughter, who opens it up to reveal the bomb. As she drops it in a panic, the dynamite explodes into a harmless shower of nuts, and the family laughs.

== Track listing ==
- Digital download / streaming
1. "Mixed Nuts" (ミックスナッツ) – 3:33
- CD / digital download / streaming (Mixed Nuts EP)
1. "Mixed Nuts" – 3:33
2. "Anarchy" – 4:29
3. "Choral A" – 3:59
4. "Hagan" (破顔, "Smile") – 4:41

== Personnel ==
Official Hige Dandism

- Satoshi Fujihara – lead vocals, lyrics, composer, additional drums, programming
- Daisuke Ozasa – guitar, backing vocals
- Makoto Narazaki – bass guitar, backing vocals
- Masaki Matsuura – drums, backing vocals

Additional musicians

- Atsuki Yumoto – trumpet, horn co-arranger
- Toshihiro Kawashima – trombone
- Andy Wulf – saxophone
- Seiya Yokota – additional drums, drums co-arranger

Production

- Genki Wada – drums technician, additional drums
- Kazutaka Minemori – guitar technician
- Kazuhiro Saito – musical instrument technician
- Shota Kinebuchi – musical instrument technician
- Takuya Kondo – musical instrument technician
- Masahito Komori – engineer
- Randy Merrill – mastered engineer

== Accolades ==
Awards and nominations for "Mixed Nuts"
| Ceremony | Year | Award | Result | Ref. |
|---|---|---|---|---|
| MTV Video Music Awards Japan | 2022 | Best Group Video (Japan) | Won | |
| Newtype Anime Awards | 2022 | Best Theme Song | 5th place | |
| Reiwa Anisong Awards | 2022 | Best Work Award | Nominated | |
| Reiwa Anisong Awards | 2022 | Composition Award (Note: Satoshi Fujihara credited as a nominee.) | Nominated | |
| Reiwa Anisong Awards | 2022 | Artist Song Award | Won | |
| Crunchyroll Anime Awards | 2023 | Best Opening Sequence | Nominated | |
| Japan Gold Disc Awards | 2023 | Song of the Year by Download (Japan) | Won | |
| Japan Gold Disc Awards | 2023 | Best 3 Songs by Download | Won | |
| Japan Gold Disc Awards | 2023 | Song of the Year by Streaming (Japan) | Won | |
| Japan Gold Disc Awards | 2023 | Best 5 Songs by Streaming | Won | |
| Anime Grand Prix | 2023 | Best Theme Song | Won | |
| AnimaniA Awards | 2024 | Best Anime Song | Nominated | |

== Charts ==
=== Weekly charts ===
Weekly chart performance for "Mixed Nuts"
| Chart (2022) | Peak position |
|---|---|
| Global 200 (Billboard) | 61 |
| Japan (Japan Hot 100) | 1 |
| Japan Hot Animation (Billboard Japan) | 1 |
| Japan (Oricon) | 3 |
| Japan Combined Singles (Oricon) | 2 |

=== Year-end charts ===
2022 year-end chart performance for "Mixed Nuts"
| Chart (2022) | Position |
|---|---|
| Global Excl. US (Billboard) | 113 |
| Japan (Japan Hot 100) | 4 |
| Japan Hot Animation (Billboard Japan) | 2 |
| Japan (Oricon) | 87 |
| Japan Combined Singles (Oricon) | 3 |

2023 year-end chart performance for "Mixed Nuts"
| Chart (2023) | Position |
|---|---|
| Japan (Japan Hot 100) | 11 |
| Japan Hot Animation (Billboard Japan) | 6 |

2024 year-end chart performance for "Mixed Nuts"
| Chart (2024) | Position |
|---|---|
| Japan (Japan Hot 100) | 58 |
| Japan Hot Animation (Billboard Japan) | 18 |

== Certifications ==
Certifications for "Mixed Nuts"
| Region | Certification | Certified units/sales |
|---|---|---|
| Japan (RIAJ) | Gold | 100,000^{*} |
Streaming
| Japan (RIAJ) | Diamond | 500,000,000^{†} |
^{*} Sales figures based on certification alone.^{†} Streaming-only figures based on certification alone.
