= ALI (band) =

Multinational band formed in 2016 in Shibuya

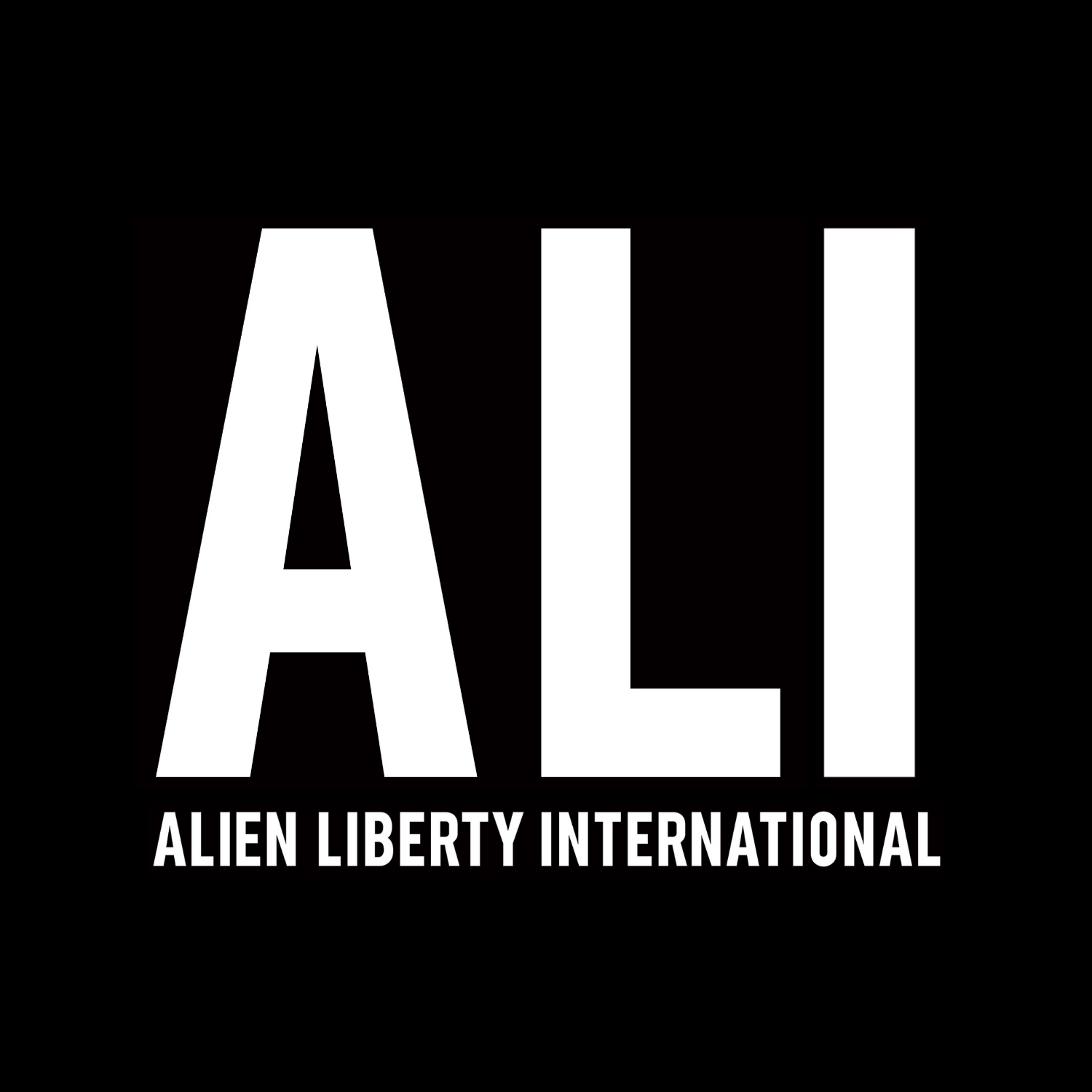
- Band logo

Background information
- Also known as: Alien Liberty International
- Origin: Shibuya, Japan
- Genres: Funk; jazz; soul; hip hop
- Years active: 2016–present
- Label: Mastersix Foundation
- Members: Leo Imamura
- Past members: Jua; Zeru; Kahadio; Yu Hagiwara; Jin Inoue; Alexander Taiyo Fidel; Luthfi Rizki Kusumah; Aiichiro César Tanaka
- Website: alienlibertyinternational.com

ALI (acronym for Alien Liberty International) is a Japanese band formed in Shibuya, Tokyo, in 2016, known for their unique fusion of funk, jazz, hip hop, and global influences. The band gained fame through their hit anime soundtracks, including "Wild Side" for Beastars and "Lost in Paradise" for Jujutsu Kaisen. All members of the band are mixed with roots in Asia, Europe, America, and Africa.

In May 2021, ALI went on indefinite hiatus following the arrest of their drummer, Kahadio, for fraud. After a six-month break, the band returned in November 2021.

As of October 2024, ALI is now a solo project led by vocalist Leo, continuing the band's signature cross-genre sound after the departure of key members Luthfi and César.

== Career ==
ALI (Alien Liberty International), a multinational hip-hop and funk band, was formed in 2016 in Shibuya, Tokyo. The group drew inspiration from global influences, blending roots from Japan, Europe, America, Asia, and Africa. Named after the boxer Muhammad Ali, the band sought to embody his energy, presence, and ideals of unity through their music.

ALI gained widespread recognition in 2019 with their debut single, "Wild Side", which served as the opening theme for the anime Beastars. This marked a turning point for the band, showcasing their cross-genre appeal. Their subsequent single, "Lost in Paradise" featuring rapper AKLO, became the ending theme for Jujutsu Kaisen, further cementing their place in the Japanese music scene.

However, On May 14, 2021, ALI faced controversy when their drummer, Kahadio, was arrested for fraud, leading to the cancellation of their contracts with Sony Music and the removal of their track "Teenage City Riot" from The World Ends with You: The Animation. The scandal resulted in the band's indefinite hiatus in May 2021. Kahadio was expelled from the group, and ALI publicly apologized to their fans and the victims of the crime.

After six months, ALI made their return in November 2021, continuing to produce music and perform live. Despite the setback, the band persisted, showcasing their resilience and passion for music. On February 23, 2022, the band released the EP "Inglourious Eastern Cowboy". On January 25, 2023, they released their debut album Music World.

In July 2024, they performed at Anime Friends in Brazil.

In October 2024, ALI transitioned into a solo project led by vocalist Leo Imamura after key members, guitarist César and bassist Luthfi, left the group to pursue new ventures.

On January 9, 2025, the song "Casanova Posse" was released, which is the opening of Dr. Stone: Science Future.

== Band members ==
Current members

- Leo Imamura – vocals (2016–present)

Former members

- Jua – rapping (2016–2020)
- Zeru – guitar (2016–2020)
- Kahadio (Kadio Shirai) – drums (2016–2021)
- Yu Hagiwara – saxophone (2017–2021)
- Jin Inoue – keyboard (2019–2021)
- Alexander Taiyo Fidel – percussion (2016–2022)
- Luthfi Rizki Kusumah – bass guitar (2016–2024)
- Aiichiro César Tanaka – guitar (2020–2024)

== Discography ==
=== Albums ===
List of studio albums, with selected chart positions
Title	Album details	Peak chart positions	
Title	Album details	JPN Oricon Digital	JPN Billboard
Music World	Released: January 25, 2023; Label: Mastersix Foundation; Formats: CD, digital download, streaming	40	41

==== Mini albums ====
List of mini albums, with selected chart positions
Title	Album details	Peak chart positions	
Title	Album details	JPN Oricon	JPN Billboard
ALI	Released: November 27, 2019; Label: Alien Liberty International; Formats: CD, digital download, streaming	—	—
Love, Music and Dance	Released: January 27, 2021; Label: Mastersix Foundation; Formats: CD, digital download, streaming	110	75
Inglourious Eastern Cowboy	Released: February 23, 2022; Label: Mastersix Foundation; Formats: Digital download, streaming	—	—
"—" denotes items which did not chart.

=== Singles ===
List of singles, with selected chart positions
Title	Year	Peak positions		Notes	Album
Title	Year	JPN Oricon	JPN Hot 100	Notes	Album
"Wild Side"	2019	113	—	OP for the anime Beastars Season 1.	Music World
"Lost in Paradise" (featuring AKLO)	2020	28	44	ED for the anime Jujutsu Kaisen.	Music World
"Never Say Goodbye" (featuring Mummy-D)	2022	36	—	OP for the anime Golden Kamuy Season 4.	Music World
"—" denotes items which did not chart.

==== Digital singles ====
Title	Year	Peak positions	Album
Title	Year	JPN Hot 100	Album
"Show Time" (featuring AKLO)	2022	—	Music World
"—" denotes items which did not chart.

==== Collaboration singles ====
Title	Year	Artists	Peak positions	Album
Title	Year	Artists	JPN Hot 100	Album
"Sabotage (VS. ALI)"	2022	Tokyo Ska Paradise Orchestra, ALI	—	Non-album single
"—" denotes items which did not chart.

== Music videos ==
Year	Song	Director(s)	Album
2019	"Vim"	Unknown	ALI
2019	"Staying in the Groove"	Masanori Kobayashi, Takuya Chiba	ALI
2019	"Temptations"	Unknown	ALI
2019	"Tokyo Pharaoh"	Unknown	ALI
2019	"No Tomorrow (Give It Up)"	Yusuke Kasai	ALI
2019	"Wild Side"	Naohiro Ohashi	Non-album singles
2020	"Muzik City" (featuring Nami Chie, Alonzo, 6B)	Unknown	Love, Music and Dance
2020	"Better Days" (featuring Dos Monos)	Katsuki Kuroyanagi	Love, Music and Dance
2020	"Lost In Paradise" (featuring AKLO)	Kento Yamada & The Monaco Club	Music World
2021	"Fight Dub Club" (featuring J-Rexxx, Rueed)	Unknown	Music World
2021	"Feelin' Good" (featuring Umeda Saifā, Koperu, Peko, KZ, R-Shitei)	Unknown	Love, Music and Dance
2022	"Teenage City Riot" (featuring R-Shitei)	Arata Takabatake & Isamu Maeda	Inglourious Eastern Cowboy
2022	"Sabotage (VS. ALI)" (featuring Tokyo Ska Paradise Orchestra)	Unknown	Non-album single
2022	"Show Time" (featuring AKLO)	Margt (Perimetron)	Music World
2023	"Wild Angel"	Kosuke Yamashita	VIVA LA MUSICA
2024	"Professionalism" (featuring Hannya)	Kosuke Yamashita	Non-album single
2024	"Beyond" (featuring MaRI)	Mineto Kanzaki	Non-album single
2024	"Neon" (featuring The Crane)	Yohei Haga	Non-album single
2025	"Casanova Posse"	Hidenobu Tanabe	Non-album single
2025	"Love Is Killing Me" (featuring eill)	Katsuki Kuroyanagi	Non-album single
2025	"Choose Life" (featuring Ashley)	Kotaro Yamada	Non-album single
2026	"Golden Horizon" (with Awich)	Hideto Hotta	Non-album single
2026	"FUNKIN’BEAUTIFUL" (featuring ZORN)	Takuto Shimpo	Non-album single

== Awards and nominations ==
Year	Award	Category	Work/Nominee	Result	Ref.
2021	5th Crunchyroll Anime Awards	Best Opening Sequence	"Wild Side" (from anime Beastars)	Won	
2021	5th Crunchyroll Anime Awards	Best Ending Sequence	"Lost in Paradise" (featuring Aklo) (from anime Jujutsu Kaisen)	Won	
