= Yahoo Japan Search Awards =

Japanese award for the most searched products

Yahoo! Japan Search Awards Yahoo!検索大賞
- Country: Japan
- Website: Yahoo! Japan 検索大賞

Yahoo! Japan Search Awards (Yahoo!検索大賞) is a Japanese award for the most searched products, media and people during the year.

== Overview ==
Each year, Yahoo! Japan recognizes celebrities and businesses in various award categories for achieving significant search volumes for related keywords. The successful keywords in each category show the significant social impact of search terms and the reciprocal nature of what people search for online and what they're interested in offline. There are multiple award categories in three major categories (Person, Culture, and Product), and the most searched for item in the Person category is selected for the Grand Prize.

In addition to those listed below, a local category was established in the 3rd edition (2016) to select the fastest-rising search terms related to the area by users in each of the 47 prefectures. From the 8th edition (2021), the product and local categories were abolished and reduced to only the person and culture categories.

== Award winners ==
=== 2014 Awards ===
Announced on December 8, 2014.

- Grand Prize : Yuzuru Hanyu
- Person category
  - Actor category: Ebizo Ichikawa
  - Actress category: Satomi Ishihara
  - Owarai Tarento Division: Nippon Elekitel Rengo
  - Athletes Division: Yuzuru Hanyu
  - Special category: HIKAKIN
  - Model category: Miwako Kakei
  - Musician Division: SEKAI NO OWARI
  - Idol category: Kanna Hashimoto ( Rev. from DVL )
- Culture category
  - Drama section: Hanako and Anne
  - Novel Division: Roosevelt Game
  - Game Division: Monster Strike
  - Film Division: Frozen
  - Anime section: Yo-Kai Watch
- Product category
  - Cosmetics category: Lunasol Eyeshadow ( Kanebo Cosmetics )
  - Car division: Hustler ( Suzuki )
  - Home Appliances: Raycop (Raycop Japan)
  - Back-order department: Mochi Yakumo (Chimoto, a sweets shop)
  - Beverage sector: Almond effect ( Glico )

=== 2015 Awards ===
Announced on December 9, 2015.

- Grand Prize : Sandaime J Soul Brothers from EXILE TRIBE
- Person category
  - Actor category: Masataka Kubota
  - Actress category: Suzu Hirose
  - Owarai Tarento Division: 8.6 seconds Bazooka
  - Athletes Division: Goromaru Ayumu
  - Model Division: Nicole Fujita
  - Musician Division: Sandaime J Soul Brothers from EXILE TRIBE
  - Idol category: Hey! Say! JUMP
  - Writer category: Naoki Matayoshi
  - Voice actor category: Tomoko Kaneda
- Culture category
  - Drama category: Rare
  - Novel section: Sparks
  - Game Division: Monster Strike
  - Film Division: Jurassic World
  - Anime section: Assassination Classroom
- Product category
  - Cosmetics category: Yves Saint Laurent Lipstick (Yves Saint Laurent)
  - Car division: S660 ( Honda )
  - Home Appliances Division: Dyson Vacuum Cleaner (Dyson)
  - Back-order department: Freshly made potato chips (Kikusudo)
  - Beverage category: Sokenbicha ( Coca-Cola Japan )
  - Sweets category: Seven Cafe Donuts ( Seven-Eleven )

=== 2016 Awards ===
Announced on December 7, 2016.

- Grand Prize : Dean Fujioka
- Person category
  - Actor category: Dean Fujioka
  - Actress category: Mitsuki Takahata
  - Owarai Tarento Division: Kazureza ( Maple Super Alloy )
  - Athletes Division: Ai Fukuhara
  - Model division: ryuchell
  - Musician Division: Sakura Fujiwara
  - Idol category: Sakurazaka46
  - Writer category: Sayaka Murata
  - Voice actor category: Yuichi Nakamura
- Culture category
  - Drama section: Sanada Maru
  - Novel section: I want to eat your pancreas
  - Game Division: Pokémon GO
  - Movie Division: Your name.
  - Buzzwords category: PPAP
  - Special category: Table tennis
- Product category
  - Cosmetics category: Marriage Lip ( Estee Lauder )
  - Car division: Estima ( Toyota )
  - Home Appliances Division: PlayStation VR ( Sony Interactive Entertainment )
  - Back-order department: Menchi-katsu (Kakunoshin)
  - Beverages: Mets ( Kirin Beverage )
  - Sweets category: Happy pancakes
  - Food Division: Super Barley Granola

=== 2017 Awards ===
Announced on December 6, 2017.

- Grand Prize : Chiemi Blouson
- Person category
  - Actor category: Issei Takahashi
  - Actress category: Riho Yoshioka
  - Owarai Tarento Division: Chiemi Blouson
  - Athletes Division: Anne Cine
  - Model category: Rika Izumi
  - Musician Division: Namie Amuro
  - Idol category: Sakurazaka46
  - Writer category: Kazuo Ishiguro
  - Voice actor section: Junichi Suwabe
  - Special category (male): Souta Fujii
  - Special category (female): Mei Nagano
- Culture category
  - Anime section: Kemono Friends
  - Movie Division: Beauty and the Beast
  - Game Division: Dragon Quest XI In search of the passing time
  - Novel section: My husband's dick does not fit
  - Drama Division: Code Blue -Doctor Heli Emergency Lifesaving-
  - Buzzword category: Sontaku
- Product category
  - Beverage category: Sokenbicha ( Coca-Cola Japan )
  - Back- order department: LeTAO cheesecake
  - Home Appliances Division : Nintendo Switch
  - Car Division: Harrier (Toyota)
  - Cosmetics category: OPERA Lip Tint
  - Food department: Nogami "raw" bread
  - Sweets category: Jiichiro's Baumkuchen

=== 2018 Awards ===
Announced on December 5, 2018

- Grand Prize : King & Prince
- Person category
  - Actor category: Tomoya Nakamura
  - Actress category: Mio Imada
  - Owarai Tarento Division: Hyokkorihan
  - Athletes Division: Yuzuru Hanyu
  - Model division: Kōki,
  - Musician Division: Namie Amuro
  - Idol category: King & Prince
  - Voice actor category: Yumiko Kobayashi
  - Writer category: Taro Yabe ( Karateka )
  - Special category (male): Yuzuru Hanyu
  - Special category (female): Naomi Osaka
- Culture category
  - Anime Division: Pop Team Epic
  - Film Division: The Greatest Showman
  - Game Division: Monster Hunter: World
  - Novel section: My husband's dick does not fit
  - Drama category: Half blue.
  - Buzzwords section: Ohsako is odd
- Product category
  - Beverages: Ayataka (Coca-Cola Japan)
  - Back-order department: LeTAO cheesecake
  - Home Appliances: iPhone 8 ( Apple )
  - Car Division: Jimny (Suzuki)
  - Cosmetics category: Opera Lip Tint
  - Food department: Nogami "raw" bread
  - Sweets category: Red silo ( Seigetsu )

=== 2019 Awards ===
Announced on December 4, 2019. Of the originally planned categories, the person category special category award and the product category order category award were not announced due to the request of the winners.

- Grand Prize : Ryusei Yokohama
- Person category
  - Actor category: Ryusei Yokohama
  - Actress category: Yu Aoi
  - Owarai Tarento Division: Ringo-chan
  - Athletes Division: Hinako Shibuno
  - Model category: Yuki Poyo
  - Musician Division: Aimyon
  - Idol category: Hinatazaka46
  - Voice actor category: Yuki Kaji
  - Writer category: Eiichiro Oda
- Culture category
  - Anime Division: Demon Slayer: Kimetsu no Yaiba
  - Movie Division: Weathering with You
  - Game Division: Dragon Quest Walk
  - Novel section: The Twelve Kingdoms
  - Drama Division: It's your turn
  - Buzzwords category: Reiwa
- Product category
  - Beverages: Gong Cha Tapioca Milk Tea
  - Home Appliances Division: IQOS ( Philip Morris Japan )
  - Car division: RAV4 (Toyota)
  - Cosmetics category: BOTANIST Botanical cleansing
  - Food department: Nogami "raw" bread
  - Sweets Division: Lawson Baschi

=== 2020 Awards ===
Announced on December 9, 2020.

- Grand Prize : Takeru Sato
- Person category
  - Actor category: Takeru Sato
  - Actress category: Mone Kamishiraishi
  - Owarai Tarento Division: Fuwa-chan
  - Athletes Division: Mikuru Asakura
  - Model section: Suzu Yamanouchi
  - Musician Division: Official Hige Dandism
  - Idol category: NiziU
  - Voice actor category: Natsuki Hanae
  - Writer category: Hitonari Tsuji
  - Special category: Souta Fujii
- Culture category
  - Anime Division: Demon Slayer: Kimetsu no Yaiba
  - Movie section: Demon Slayer: Kimetsu no Yaiba – The Movie: Mugen Train
  - Game Division: Animal Crossing: New Horizons ( Nintendo )
  - Novel section: The Plague ( Albert Camus )
  - Drama section: Naoki Hanzawa
  - Buzzwords category: Zoom
- Product category
  - Beverages: Discerning Lemon Sour Lemon Hall ( Coca-Cola Japan )
  - Back- order department: Shiroi Koibito ( Ishiya Co., Ltd. )
  - Home Appliances Division: Nintendo Switch
  - Car Division: Yaris Cross ( Toyota )
  - Cosmetics Division: V3 Foundation
  - Food sector: Neko Neko bread
  - Sweets category: misdo meets PIERRE HERME
