= Spy × Family =

Japanese manga series by Tatsuya Endo

- First tankōbon volume cover, featuring Loid Forger
- Genre: Action; Spy/Comedy; Slice of life
- Manga
- Written by: Tatsuya Endo
- Published by: Shueisha
- English publisher: NA: Viz Media
- Imprint: Jump Comics+
- Magazine: Shōnen Jump+
- Original run: March 25, 2019 – present
- Volumes: 18
- Anime television series
- Spy × Family (2022–present)
- Anime films
- Spy × Family Code: White (2023)
- icon

Spy × Family (stylized as SPY×FAMILY and pronounced "spy family") is a Japanese web manga series written and illustrated by Tatsuya Endo. The story follows Agent Twilight, an enigmatic spy who has to "build a family" to execute a mission, not realizing that his adopted daughter is a telepath, and the woman he agrees to marry is a skilled assassin. The series has been serialized biweekly on Shueisha's Shōnen Jump+ app and website since March 2019, with its chapters collected in 18 tankōbon volumes as of November 2026. It is licensed in North America by Viz Media.

An anime television series adaptation produced by Wit Studio and CloverWorks aired from April to December 2022, with a second cours aired from October to December of the same year. The second season, continuing from 2022's adaptation, aired from October to December 2023. A third season aired from October to December 2025. An anime film titled Spy × Family Code: White, featuring the cast from the television series reprising their roles, was released theatrically in Japan in December 2023 and in the United States and Canada in April 2024. A fourth season including a theatrical film is set to premiere in 2027.

By April 2026, Spy × Family had over 42 million copies in circulation, making it one of the best-selling manga series of all time. The series has received critical acclaim for its storytelling, humor, characters, action scenes, and artwork.

== Plot ==
In order to maintain the state of peace between the rival nations of Westalis and Ostania, (Note: Westalis and Ostania are claimed by third-party sources to be inspired by West and East Germany, respectively; Endo has neither explicitly confirmed nor denied this belief, though in interviews he does not correct any questions implying that the manga is set in Germany.) a Westalian agent code-named "Twilight" is tasked with spying on politician Donovan Desmond, leader of the National Unity Party within Ostania. However, due to Desmond being notoriously reclusive, the only way Twilight can get close to him is to enroll a child in the same private school as Desmond's son, Damian, and pose as a fellow parent.

To accomplish this and present the image of a happy family, he creates the alias of psychiatrist Dr. Loid Forger, adopts a young orphan girl named Anya, and marries an Ostanian city hall clerk named Yor Briar. However, unbeknownst to him, Anya is a telepath, and Yor is in fact a professional assassin. Yor also sought a marriage of cover, because single adult women draw suspicion and attention in the paranoid Ostania. Neither Loid nor Yor are aware of each other's true identities, nor that Anya's powers allow her to know their true professions. The family later takes in a Great Pyrenees dog named Bond, who possesses precognitive abilities (unbeknownst to the entire family except Anya). Despite these unknown factors and Twilight's occasional lapses of common sense due to years of being a spy, he must learn to play the role of the perfect father and husband to carry out his mission. All while attempting to earn the trust of his brother-in-law, Yuri Briar.

== Production ==
In contrast to his previous works, manga author Tatsuya Endo was told by his editor Shihei Lin said that he and Endo are always conscious of the line where violence, a necessary aspect in a spy manga, is given a pass for comedy's sake. With Tista and Blade of the Moon Princess both having a dark tone, the editor told Endo to give Spy × Family a more cheerful one. Anya was inspired by the main character of Rengoku no Ashe. Her extrasensory perception was decided early on, and Lin cited its use for comedic effect as one of the series' strengths. Lin said that the series has a broad readership among all ages and genders. He also cited Endo's clean art and ability to convey emotions as part of the manga's appeal. Endo conceived the series as a on theme of a "fake family", and try a different type of spy that work fiction that tends employ. He had no experience with spy families so he decided that the manga should focus instead on Loid's families and the lies each have.

The author said the core of the cast was three people hiding their true identities from one another. This trait was in particular inspired by the anime series Code Geass as its main cast also have a tendency to hide their true personas. envisioned Loid as both as a cool character as well as straight man. Loid's characterization was made to be ikemen archetype of an individual being stylish when doing most of his actions. Endo originally wrote Loid as a charismatic and social person, but lacking good spy skills, causing his reputation to drop with every mission. He originally did not plan to use Yor in the series as he only came up with the idea of Loid and his adoptive daughter Anya. He eventually decided to add a mother figure and came up with Yor. Yor's personality was conceived so that he would mention violent commentaries on a polite fashion. Despite being an assassin, Endo researched clothing to make her beautiful. Due problems with his previous work Gekka Bijin, Endo wanted to try simpler costumes on Yor. Lin feels that the world and characters were firmly established as of volume two. As such, he revealed that he and Endo would start to include longer narratives in the series.

Endo and his editor Shihei Lin have known each other for over ten years; Lin was his initial editor on his first manga series, Tista (2007). When Lin was moved from the Jump Square editorial department to Shōnen Jump+, Endo happily followed, and they began developing a new work. Spy × Family takes elements from three of Endo's Jump Square one-shots: Rengoku no Āshe (煉獄のアーシェ; lit. "Ashe of Purgatory"), Ishi ni Usubeni, Tetsu ni Hoshi (石に薄紅、鉄に星; lit. "The Pink in Stone, the Star in Steel"), and I Spy. Lin said that its reception among the editorial department was so positive that serialization was practically decided before the official meeting was even held. The initial draft was given the working title Spy Family written in Japanese. When deciding the final name, Endo came up with over 100 options but he ultimately decided to use the same title but in English and with a "cross" in between, the latter influenced by Hunter × Hunter.

== Media ==
=== Manga ===
Written and illustrated by Tatsuya Endo, Spy × Family has been serialized biweekly on the Shōnen Jump+ app and website since March 25, 2019. The chapters, which are released every other Monday, have been collected and published into individual tankōbon volumes by Shueisha. Shueisha also simultaneously publishes the series in English for free on the Manga Plus platform.

Viz Media began publishing Spy × Family in English digitally on their website for free on September 22, 2019. The Viz version is translated by Casey Loe. They released the first volume in print on June 2, 2020.

The manga series has one companion book, Spy × Family Official Fanbook: Eyes Only, published on May 2, 2022. A comprehensive collection of information, it includes detailed information and analysis about the series' characters and worlds, colored artworks, early character designs, guest artist contributions, a long interview with Endo, and commentary on most chapters by Endo and Lin. On February 3, 2023, Viz Media announced that they had licensed the companion book for English publication. The companion book was released on October 3, 2023.

=== Light novel ===
The light novel Spy × Family: Family Portrait (SPY×FAMILY 家族の肖像, Spy × Family: Kazoku no Shōzō), written by Aya Yajima, was published on July 2, 2021. The book contains four disconnecting chapters and a seven-page "short story". The first chapter, "Anya's Nature Class" (アーニャの自然教室, Ānya no Shizen Kyōshitsu), (Note: The official English version, published by Viz, discarded the Japanese chapter titles and followed the manga chapter's naming practice, which is "Mission" followed by the chapter number. The only exception is the last chapter, which is named "Short Story".) tells the story of the time Anya and Damian got lost in the forest on their school nature camp. The second chapter, "Yuri's Day Off" (ユーリの休暇, Yūri no Kyūka), recounts the day Yuri took Anya to experience a mock-up of future employment for kids. The third chapter, "Franky's New Love!?" (フランキーの新たな恋！？, Furankī no Aratana Koi!?), tells the story of Franky's short-lived love with a blind opera singer from a prestigious family. The fourth chapter, "Portrait of the Forger Family!?" (フォージャー家の肖像画！？, Fōjā-ka no Shōzōga!?), tells about the day the Forger family modeled for a famous painter in the park. In the "short story" chapter, "Family (Temporary)" (ファミリー（休）, Famirī (kyū)), two waitresses were talking about their ideal family, the Forgers, among many unhappy families they saw. On December 20, 2023, Shueisha released an audiobook version of the light novel, featuring the voices of Miyuri Shimabukuro and Ryōhei Arai. This marked the first time a Jump J-Books light novel received an audiobook release. On February 3, 2023, Viz Media announced that they have licensed the light novel for English publication. The Viz's English-translated novel was released on December 26, 2023. It was translated by Casey Loe, who was also the translator for official English manga published by Viz; it was edited by Holly Fisher and designed by Francesca Truman.

On April 7, 2023, Shueisha's Mirai Bunko announced that a novel adaptation of the manga is in the works. The first volume, Temporary Family (かりそめの家族, Karisome no Kazoku), written by Hitomi Wada, was released on May 26, 2023. The contents of the novel is described to follow the plot of the manga's first volume. The second volume, Admission! The Prestigious Academy Eden (入学！名門校イーデン, Nyūgaku! Meimonkō Īden), is also written by the same writer as the first book and was released on August 4, 2023. The contents of the novel is described to follow the plot of the manga's second and third volume. The third volume, The Mysterious Dog and the Bombing Incident (ふしぎな犬と爆弾事件, Fushigina Inu to Bakudan Jiken), is also written by the same writer and was released on November 11, 2023. The contents of the novel is described to follow the plot of the manga's fourth volume.

A novel adaptation of the movie Spy × Family Code: White with the same name was published on December 22, 2023, the same day as the movie premiere. It is written by Aya Yajima, who also penned for the first light novel Spy × Family: Family Portrait. The novel was based on the plot of the movie, which is screenplay by Ichirō Ōkouchi.

=== Anime ===
On November 1, 2021, an anime television series adaptation of Spy × Family produced by Wit Studio and CloverWorks was announced via a trailer video and the anime's website. The series was directed by Kazuhiro Furuhashi, with character designs handled by Kazuaki Shimada, and music composed and produced by (K)now Name. The series ran for two split cours and contained episodes. The first cour aired from April 9 to June 25, 2022, on TXN stations. The second cour aired from October 1 to December 24, 2022. Crunchyroll licensed the series outside of Asia. Muse Communication licensed the series in Taiwan, South and Southeast Asia; they are streaming it on their YouTube channel, Muse Asia (limited release in some of the available regions during the first-air run), Netflix, iQIYI, Bilibili, Disney+ Hotstar and other regional streaming services. On April 11, 2022, Crunchyroll announced that the series would receive an English dub. It had an early preview on Crunchyroll's Twitch channel on April 15, before premiering the following day.

Accompanying the anime, the guidebook Animation × 1st Mission, which includes anime character designs, storyboards, key animations, promotion images, interviews and comments from the staff and the voice actors, was released on April 4, 2022. The book acts as a starter guide for the anime series and does not contain many details about later episodes after the first two. The second guide book Mission Report:220409-0625, which provides in greater details of the first half of the first season, was released on September 2, 2022. It includes information for the main characters; details of the first twelve episodes; key arts for location settings and stories; storyboards; interviews and comments from the staff, the actors and the singers of the first opening and first ending songs, Official Hige Dandism and Gen Hoshino. The third guide book Mission Report:221001‐1224, which provides in the details of the second half of the first season, was released on September 4, 2023.

On December 18, 2022, a second season was announced at the Jump Festa '23 event. Ichirō Ōkouchi replaced Furuhashi as scriptwriter, while the remaining staff and cast reprised their roles. The 12-episode second season aired from October 7 to December 23, 2023.

On October 4, 2023, Wit Studio announced an art book for the anime adaptation, titled Spy × Family Animation Art Book. The book was released on December 8, 2023, containing 200 pages of character designs, background designs, prop and item designs, anime and collaboration artworks, storyboards for season 1's second cour's opening animation by Tetsurō Araki and ending animation by Takayuki Hirao.

On June 9, 2024, a third season of the anime was announced at the Spy × Family Anime Extra Mission special event. Yukiko Imai replaced Furuhashi and Takahiro Harada as the season's director, while the remaining staff and cast returned to reprise their roles. It aired from October 4 to December 27, 2025.

On November 8, 2026, a fourth season of the anime was announced at the Spy × Family Anime Extra Mission II special event. Yasuhiro Akamatsu replaced Imai as the season's director, with Aya Takaha handled the series' composition, and character designs by Kazuaki Shimada and Satoshi Kawadaki. It is set to premiere in 2027.

==== Films ====
An anime film was announced at the Jump Festa '23 event. On March 25, 2023, it was revealed to be titled Spy × Family Code: White, and the film was released on December 22, 2023. Tatsuya Endo supervised the production and provided original character designs. The film was directed by Takashi Katagiri, while the screenplay written by Ichirō Ōkouchi. On September 12, 2023, it was reported that Tomoya Nakamura and Kento Kaku would voice the movie-original villain duo for the movie named Dmitri and Luka, respectively. On September 22, 2023, it was announced that Banjō Ginga and Shunsuke Takeuchi were cast for the role of two other villains, Snidel and Type F.

A limited-printed booklet, named Spy × Family Code: White Film File was distributed exclusively for early movie audiences in Japan. It contains an original 8-paged manga done by the manga creator Tatsuya Endo, interviews with Endo, the anime staff and voice actor cast, with its cover also drawn by Endo. The print number is limited to 4 million copies. Along with this announcement, it is also announced that the opening day's earliest screening would be at midnight, when they started distributing the booklet. On 9 January 2024, AR illustration cards drawn by Tatsuya Endo were announced to be distributed for movie audiences in Japan. It contained a QR code on the back that can display a 3D pop-out model of Anya Forger speaking her voice lines if read by smart phones.

On July 2, 2023, it was announced that the movie was going to have a collaboration project with Street Fighter 6. An illustration drawn by Capcom's illustrator and designer Chisato Mita was revealed along with the announcement. On December 4, 2023, Capcom social media released the animated short video of Yor Forger and Street Fighter 6's character Chun-Li dueling on Suval'hal Arena stage. The animation was made by Wit Studio, with Shunsuke Aoki doing key animation and Kyōji Asano working on storyboard and character design. On 9 January 2024, Capcom revealed and released the in-game collab items, which are avatar costumes based on Yor's Thorn Princess dress and Loid Forger's signature dark cyan suit. Yor and Loid's hairstyles are also added to the avatar creation. Players who log in during the collaboration period, which lasted until 31 January, would receive free items like picture frames, stickers, and player titles. The Battle Hub area would also receive a temporary redesign to promote the movie.

On July 10, 2023, a collaboration project with the movie Mission: Impossible – Dead Reckoning Part One was announced. A parody poster illustration featuring the main characters of the anime replacing the Mission: Impossible cast was released with the announcement, as was a highlight video for Dead Reckoning Part One narrated by the voice actors of the Forgers. On September 19, 2023, another collaboration project with the movie Wish was announced. A parody poster illustration featuring Anya and Bond Forger, which mirrors the Japanese theatrical release poster of Wish, and a combination trailer video were also released on the same day.

On November 8, 2026, a second theatrical film was announced at the Spy × Family Anime Extra Mission II special event. It is set to be released in Japan in 2027.

=== Musical ===
A musical adaptation, titled Musical Spy × Family (ミュージカル スパイファミリー, Myūjikaru Supai Famirī), was reported to be in production under Toho Stage's production on May 1, 2022. The musical premiered at Tokyo's Imperial Theatre in March 2023, with a nationwide tour following in April and May of the same year.

On September 30, 2022, it was announced that the musical play would debut on March 8, 2023, with Win Morisaki and Hiroki Suzuki playing Loid Forger, while Fuka Yuduki and Mirei Sasaki played Yor Forger. For Anya's role, the actor(s) would be selected via audition. The cast also featured Kurumu Okamiya and Tsubasa Takizawa as Yuri Briar, Kento Kinouchi as Franky Franklin, Manato Asaka as Sylvia Sherwood, Sōma Suzuki as Henry Henderson, and Nonoka Yamaguchi as Fiona Frost. G2 took the director, screenplay and lyric writer roles, while Shuhei Kamimura was in charge of composing, arranging, and directing the music. For the nationwide tour, the musical was performed in the Kobelco Grand Hall at Hyogo Performing Arts Center in Nishinomiya, Hyōgo Prefecture in April and at Hakata-za Theatre in Fukuoka, Fukuoka Prefecture in May. On December 14, 2022, the cast for Anya Forger was announced; she would be played interchangeably by four actresses: Risa Masuda, Aoi Ikemuda, Miharu Izawa and Miharu Fukuchi.

A second musical play was announced during the Jump Festa '25 event on December 21, 2024. It was performed in multiple cities from September 20 to December 30, 2025. The cast including Win Morisaki as Loid and Fuka Yuduki as Yor reprised their roles from the first musical play, while Genki Hirakata and Sora Kazuki played Loid and Yor respectively. The staff hosted auditions for child actors for Anya. On June 14, 2025, the cast for Anya Forger was announced; she would be played interchangeably by four actresses: Rana Izutani, Mirei Tsukino, Mio Nishiyama and Nonoka Murakata. An official replay of the musical will be streamend on the Taiwanese platform, KKTIX, and the Japanese version of the streaming service, Hulu, from July 6-20, 2026.

On October 7, 2025, it was announced a sequel to the first play, titled Musical Spy × Family 2 (ミュージカル スパイフミリー 2, Myūjikaru Supai Famirī 2). The cast includes the return of Morisaki and Kento Kiuchi as Loid, Yuduki as Yor and Manato Asaka as Sylvia Sherwood; likewise, joining the cast are Kiho Maaya as the second Yor's actress —replacing Sora Kazuki— , Toru Isono as Keith Kepler, Hitomi Arisa as Olka Gretcher, Kazuya Naraki as Zeb, Keigo Yoshino as Matthew McMahon and Haruka Manase as the second playoff of Sylvia Sherwood. On June 15, 2026, it was announced that three different child actresses would play Anya: Rana Izutani, Kanau Kozano, and Reika Mano. The musical will have a preview at the Westa Kawagoe in Saitama from September 9-11, 2026, before holding its official duties from September 22 to October 29 at the Tokyo Tatemono Brilllia Hall. Subsequently, it will be performed at the Hakataza Theater in Fukuoka in November, at the Hyogo Performing Arts Center KOBELCO Main Hall, Misono-za Theater in Nagoya, and Yamagin Prefectural Hall in Yamagata in December.

=== Video games ===
A video game based on the series was announced in a Nintendo Direct on September 14, 2023. Titled Spy × Anya: Operation Memories, (Note: It is titled Spy × Family Operation Diary in Japan.) the game was developed by Groove Box Japan and published by Bandai Namco Entertainment. The game allows the player to experience Anya Forger's everyday-life activities with her friends and family, in order to take and collect photos for Anya's diary. As a daily-life simulation game, it gives the player the options to visit locations in the series, participate in minigames like The Dodgeball game, and customize the characters' appearances and outfits. The game was released on December 21, 2023, on the Nintendo Switch in Japan, and was released on PlayStation 4 and PlayStation 5 on June 27, 2024, And followed by internationally release on June 28 for home consoles and Windows via Steam.

=== Others ===
An amusement park attraction based on the series, named Spy × Family Secret Mission (Spy×Family シークレット・ミッション, Spy×Family Shīkuretto Misshon), opened for visitors at the Universal Studios Japan theme park from February 17 to July 2, 2023. Participants were placed in the role of a newcomer agent from the in-universe spy agency WISE, trying solving hidden codes at various locations around the park. After successfully solving the codes, they were permitted to attend a live show featuring the Forger family members. From July 1, 2025, to January 4, 2026, the theme park is again hosted an attraction based on the series. The VR/XR ride opened for visitors who solved quizzes and hear the Forger family having fun. Its story ride is a conversion of the Hollywood Dream the Ride, in which the visitors can hear dialogue from Eden Academy students Anya Forger, Becky Blackbell, and Damian Desmond.

On April 3, 2023, it was announced that an official art exhibition would be held at Matsuya Ginza at Ginza, Tokyo from July 20 to August 13, 2023. Afterwards, the exhibition went on a nationwide tour, starting at Osaka in August and then to other cities in Japan, including Fukuoka and Sapporo. Tickets for the first four days were distributed via a lucky draw lottery while the general admission tickets were sold on a later date. The exhibition included the original artworks by the manga creator among various other exhibits. There were "mission keywords" hidden around the venue, which encouraged visitors to find all of them to receive a prize.

On July 10, 2023, Shueisha announced the return of "Manga Dive", an immersive VR experience, at Lumine Zero event hall in Shinjuku, Tokyo. The three Shōnen Jump+ series, Spy × Family, Chainsaw Man and Dandadan were chosen to be the main features of the VR show. The show was projected on five surfaces of the event hall by the use of twelve projectors and the sounds were presented by eight speakers to simulate a stereoscopic experience for the audiences. The screening of Spy × Family show began on August 14 and lasted until August 23.

== Reception ==
=== Popularity ===
In December 2019, Brutus magazine included the series on their "Most Dangerous Manga" list, which included works with the most "stimulating" and thought-provoking themes. Later that same month, Polygon included it on a list of the best comics of 2019. The 2020 edition of the Kono Manga ga Sugoi! guidebook named Spy × Family the best manga series for male readers. The series ranked first on Honya Club's Nationwide Bookstore Employees' Recommended Comics of 2020 list, compiled by surveying 1,100 professional bookstore employees in Japan. It ranked fifth in a 2020 poll conducted by AnimeJapan of "Most Wanted Anime Adaptation". It was named as the "No. 1 Popular Web Comic of 2019," the "No. 1 Popular Shōnen Jump+ Work," and a "Signature Work of Jump+". In May 2022, as stated by the manga's editor Shihei Lin, the series reached 350 million views on Shōnen Jump+. In August 2022, the series reached 480 million views. About a month later, the series reached 500 million views. The manga topped the 2022 "Book of the Year" list by Da Vinci magazine; it ranked nineteenth on the 2023 list; and seventh on the 2024 list.

=== Sales ===
In 2019, Spy × Family had 300,000 copies in circulation, including digital and physical sales, less than a month after the release of its first volume. The series reached 800,000 copies 2 months later, upon the release of its second volume. This number exceeded 2 million with the release of volume three, and 3 million in circulation by volume four. Less than two weeks before the release of its fourth volume, Spy × Family became the second fastest and successful hit, behind Assassination Classroom. According to Oricon, volumes three and four of the series were two of the top 30 best-selling manga volumes of 2020. It became the first Shōnen Jump+ series to receive an initial print run of over 1 million copies with its sixth volume. With its sixth volume released in December 2020, Spy × Family had over 8 million digital and physical copies in circulation. At that time, it was the ninth best-selling manga in 2020, with over 4.5 million copies sold within that year.

In 2020, the third volume of Spy × Family had received an initial print run of 400,000 copies. Along with Kingdom, it had an initial print run of 1 million copies, with its sixth volume in 2021. In May 2021, Spy × Family had reached 10 million copies in circulation and increased to 11 million copies by the next month. With 537,558 copies sold in its first week, volume six became the series' second consecutive volume to debut at number one on Oricon's weekly list of the best-selling manga. Volume six was among the top 30 best-selling manga volumes of 2021 according to Oricon. By November 2021, the manga had over 12.5 million copies in circulation. It was the eighth best-selling manga in 2021, with over 4.9 million copies sold within that year. The series was ranked 10th on Rakuten's Top 20 Best Selling Digital Manga of 2020 and 16th in 2021.

On April 3, 2022, on the eve of the release of volume 9 and the premiere of the anime, the manga was reported to have over 15 million copies in circulation. By May 2022, the manga had over 21 million copies in circulation. It was tentatively the third best-selling manga from the last month of 2021 to the first 5 months of 2022. In August 2022, the manga had over 25 million copies in circulation, doubling in number compared with 9 months prior. In October, around the return of the anime's second cour and the release of volume 10, it was reported that the series had more than 26.5 million copies in circulation. By October, the manga had over 27 million copies in circulation. It was the third best-selling manga series in 2022, with over 10.6 million copies sold; its first ten volumes were among the 25 best-selling manga volumes of the year. The series was also ranked fifth on Rakuten's Top 20 Best Selling Digital Manga of 2022. In December the same year, it was reported that the series has surpassed 29 million copies in circulation.

On March 23, 2023, editor Shihei Lin reported that the series had over 30 million copies in circulation, on the eve of the release of volume 11. On September 12, 2023, it was reported that the series had reached 31 million copies in circulation with 12 volumes, including volume 12's number that would be released in the next 3 weeks. Volumes 11 and 12 were among the best-selling manga volumes of 2023. On December 17, 2023, the series was reported to have over 34 million copies in circulation. Volume 11 was Shueisha's third-highest first print run manga volume of 2023–2024 (period from April 2023 to March 2024), with 1.55 million copies printed. In March 2024, the series had reached over 35 million copies in circulation with the release of volume 13. In December 2024, the series had reached over 38 million copies in circulation. Volume 14 had an initial print run of 1.3 million copies printed, making it Shueisha's third-highest first print run manga volume of 2024–2025 (period from April 2024 to March 2025). Volumes 13 and 14 were among the best-selling manga volumes of 2024, placing fourth and seventh, respectively. In December 2025, it was reported that the manga had reached over 41 million copies in circulation. Volumes 15 and 16 were among the best-selling manga volumes of 2025, placing sixth and eighth, respectively. In April 2026, the series surpassed 42 million copies in circulation. During the period from November 2025 to May 2026, volume 17 was ranked as the second best-selling manga volume, with 553,059 copies sold.

The 17th volume appeared in several rankings introduced by Billboard Japan in 2026—which account for physical and digital sales, as well as library loans and social media popularity. It reached fifth place on the Hot Manga chart, which ranks the top manga of the year. It placed seventh on the Hot Shot Books chart, which tracks books experiencing the most significant commercial growth and rising popularity. It ranked seventeenth on the Reiwa Books chart, which lists the best books published during the Reiwa era. It placed twentieth on the Book Hot 100, which ranks the top 100 books of the year. To achieve these rankings, the volume placed sixth in the physical retail category, fifth in the e-books section, and seventh in terms of social media presence.

The volumes of Spy × Family have sold well in North America. They were ranked on Circana (formerly NPD) BookScan's monthly top 20 adult graphic novels list since June 2020. Several volumes of the manga have also ranked on The New York Times' Graphic Books and Manga bestseller monthly list since May 2021. According to NPD BookScan, the three volumes of Spy × Family were ranked among the top 20 highest-selling manga volumes in 2022; four volumes were among the top 20 highest-selling manga volumes in 2023. In the United States, the series' 6 volumes collectively sold 220,000 copies in 2021. In France, the series has had one million copies sold as of volume 6. On October 19, 2023, the French publisher Kurokawa reported that the series has sold over 4.375 million copies as of volume 11.

=== Critical response ===
The series has received widespread critical acclaim. In a positive review of the first 11 chapters, Antonio Mireles of The Fandom Post summed up Spy × Family as a great comedy about a dysfunctional family put into uncanny situations that never pan out as planned due to their unique personalities. He described the family setup of Loid as the straight man, Yor the "dumb character" and Anya the adorable child "that readers fall in love with," as the perfect recipe for a comedy. However, he felt the humor that comes from Yor being the dumb character was underutilized. Comic Book Resources' Hannah Collins hailed the first volume as one of the best manga releases of 2020. She had strong praise for Endo's art; writing that "Action-comedy is no mean feat even in animated or live-action mediums. To pull it off so well in still images takes real artistic talent." The reviewer called the artist's range of facial expressions his secret weapon, which he deployed to win over the hearts and minds of readers; particularity with those of Anya, whom Collins said, "steals every page she appears on."

Morgana Santilli of The Beat stated that the series' first volume does an excellent job balancing fun espionage action with heartwarming family moments. She called Endo's art "clean and appealing," which made his parody of post-war Berlin easily recognizable. Santilli compared its comedy to that of From Eroica with Love, another Cold War-centric series. In a review for Polygon, Julia Lee stated that Endo takes a premise that could make a "typical, corny, action manga" and used it to make one of the funniest contemporary series. Like the other reviewers, Lee praised Endo's art, writing that he had a knack for action scenes, as well as "expressive panels that really show you how the characters are feeling."

The first season was highly acclaimed, earning a perfect 100% approval rating from six critic reviews and a 91% Popcornmeter score on Rotten Tomatoes.

=== Awards and nominations ===
Year	Award	Category	Result	Ref.
2019	5th Next Manga Awards	Web Manga	Won	
2019	Apple Books Awards	Best Shōnen Manga	Won	
2019	Kono Manga ga Sugoi! 2020 Top Ranking Manga	Manga for Male Reader	1st place	
2020	4th Tsutaya Comic Awards	Next Hit	Won	
2020	Ridibooks Comic Award	Special Prize	Won	
2020	Konishi Prize	Best Translated Manga	Nominated	
2020	44th Kodansha Manga Award	Best Shōnen Manga	Nominated	
2020	24th Tezuka Osamu Cultural Prize	Grand Prize	Nominated	
2020	13th Manga Taishō	Manga Taishō	2nd place	
2020	Da Vinci 20th Annual Book of the Year	Book of the Year	3rd place	
2020	15th Japanese Nationwide Bookstore Employees' Recommendations	Recommendations Comic of 2020	1st place	
2021	14th Manga Taishō	Manga Taishō	10th place	
2021	Sanyodo Comic Award	Best Manga	2nd place	
2021	Eisner Award	Best U.S. Edition of International Material—Asia	Nominated	
2021	Harvey Award	Best Manga	Nominated	
2021	48th Angoulême International Comics Festival	Youth Selection	Nominated	
2022	Eisner Award	Best U.S. Edition of International Material—Asia	Nominated	
2022	French Babelio Readers' Awards	Best Manga Series	Won	
2022	Japan Expo Awards	Daruma d'or	Won	
2022	Geeks d'Ouro	Best Translated Manga	Won	
2022	Harvey Award	Best Manga	Nominated	
2022	28th Manga Barcelona Awards	Best Shōnen	Won	
2022	Da Vinci 22nd Annual Book of the Year	Book of the Year	1st place	
2023	52nd Japan Cartoonists Association Award	Grand Prize	Won	
2023	27th Tezuka Osamu Cultural Prize	Grand Prize	Nominated	
2023	Harvey Award	Best Manga	Nominated	
2023	29th Manga Barcelona Awards	Best Shōnen	Nominated	
2023	Da Vinci 23rd Annual Book of the Year	Book of the Year	19th place	
2024	Da Vinci 24th Annual Book of the Year	Book of the Year	7th place	
