= Spy × Family Code: White =

2023 Japanese animated film by Takashi Katagiri

- Theatrical release poster
- Kanji: 劇場版 SPY×FAMILY CODE: White
- Revised Hepburn: Gekijōban Supai Famirī Kōdo: Howaito
- Directed by: Takashi Katagiri
- Screenplay by: Ichirō Ōkouchi
- Based on: Spy × Family by Tatsuya Endo
- Produced by: Mirei Tsumura; Masaya Saitō; Soichiro Saito; Mirai Yamauchi; Tetsuya Nakatake; Yūichi Fukushima; Takako Yamamori
- Starring: Takuya Eguchi; Atsumi Tanezaki; Saori Hayami; Kenichirou Matsuda
- Cinematography: Akane Fushihara
- Edited by: Akari Saito
- Music by: Makoto Miyazaki ((K)now Name)
- Animation by: Kyoji Asano
- Production companies: Wit Studio; CloverWorks
- Distributed by: Toho
- Release date: 22 December 2023 (Japan)
- Running time: 110 minutes
- Country: Japan
- Language: Japanese
- Box office: US$246.3 million

Spy × Family Code: White (Note: Stylized as SPY×FAMILY CODE: White) is a 2023 Japanese animated spy action comedy film directed by Takashi Katagiri from a screenplay by Ichirō Ōkouchi. It is based on the manga series Spy × Family by Tatsuya Endo.

Spy × Family Code: White was released in theaters in Japan on 22 December 2023. The voice cast of the anime television series reprised their roles for the film. The film received positive reviews from critics and grossed over ¥6.32 billion (with US$246 million worldwide), making it the fourth highest-grossing Japanese film of 2024.

== Plot ==
Loid Forger completes a mission for WISE but is informed by his handler, Sylvia Sherwood, that he may be replaced on Operation Strix unless he achieves meaningful progress. On his way out, Loid is seen by his wife Yor speaking with fellow spy Fiona Frost, which Yor misinterprets as a kiss.

At Eden Academy, Anya's class is holding a cooking competition, with the winner possibly earning a Stella star. Learning that the judge, the principal, loves a dessert called Meremere from the northern city of Frigis, Loid decides to take the family there to sample and recreate it, hoping to improve Operation Strix. On the train ride, Anya discovers a key and, after reading their dog Bond's precognitive thoughts, believes there is a treasure aboard. She opens a suitcase and eats the chocolate inside, unaware that it contains a microfilm. The suitcase owners try to capture her, but Yor knocks them out.

In Frigis, the family tries the city's last Meremere at a restaurant, only for Colonel Snidel, an Ostanian military officer, to seize it and humiliate Loid. With no ingredients left, the Forgers decide to gather them themselves. Yor, anxious over her misunderstanding with Loid, grows emotional and gets drunk. Anya, sensing their tension, arranges for Loid and Yor to ride the ferris wheel, where they resolve their misunderstanding.

Meanwhile, Snidel reveals his plan to use the microfilm to spark war with Westalis and sends soldiers to retrieve it. Loid tries to find cherry liquor, the final ingredient for Meremere, but fails. Anya, determined to help, uses her telepathy and Bond's visions to locate it, sneaking out with Bond. Though she secures the liquor, Snidel's men capture her, leaving Bond behind.

Realizing Anya is missing, Loid and Yor search frantically. Loid deduces from Bond's clues that military men abducted Anya. Fiona arrives with intel about the microfilm and Snidel's airship. When Loid learns Anya swallowed the microfilm and is aboard the airship, he hijacks a Bristol Beaufighter to rescue her, with Yor secretly following.

Loid crash-lands on the airship and uses disguises to infiltrate it, while Yor accidentally starts a fire onboard. Anya, now Snidel's prisoner, tries to hold in her bowel movements to protect the microfilm. She later learns that Snidel plans to get the microfilm himself, by means of killing Anya. But eventually relieves herself, allowing Snidel to hide her in the cockpit. During a standoff, Snidel identifies Loid by smell and uses experimental gas, but Anya manages to open a window, dispersing the gas. Loid incapacitates Snidel, orders an evacuation, and disguises himself as the colonel to maintain control.

Yor battles Type F, a powerful cyborg soldier, and defeats it by setting it on fire using the lipstick Loid gave her. Reunited, the Forgers steer the airship into a river, preventing a disaster. Loid recovers the microfilm lodged in Anya's teeth.

Back home, Loid hands the microfilm to Sylvia, who confirms he will remain in charge of Operation Strix. At Eden Academy, Anya's cooking competition is delayed due to an accident. Loid proposes another family trip—this time to a warmer region with a new dessert—while Bond foresees a peaceful vacation.

In a post-credits scene, Franky arrives in Frigis with cherry liquor for Loid, unaware the Forgers had already left.

== Voice cast ==
Character	Japanese	English
Loid Forger (ロイド・フォージャー, Roido Fōjā) / Twilight (黄昏, Tasogare)	Takuya Eguchi	Alex Organ
Anya Forger (アーニャ・フォージャー, Ānya Fōjā)	Atsumi Tanezaki	Megan Shipman
Yor Forger (ヨル・フォージャー, Yoru Fōjā) née Briar (ブライア, Buraia) / Thorn Princess (いばら姫, Ibara Hime)	Saori Hayami	Natalie Van Sistine
Bond Forger (ボンド・フォージャー, Bondo Fōjā)	Kenichirou Matsuda	Tyler Walker
Narrator	Kenichirou Matsuda	Ben Philips
Sylvia Sherwood (シルヴィア・シャーウッド, Shiruvia Shāuddo) / Handler (管理官(ハンドラー), Handorā)	Yūko Kaida	Stephanie Young
Fiona Frost (フィオナ・フロスト, Fiona Furosuto) / Nightfall (夜帷, Tobari)	Ayane Sakura	Lindsay Seidel
Franky Franklin (フランキー・フランクリン, Furankī Furankurin)	Hiroyuki Yoshino	Anthony Bowling
Yuri Briar (ユーリ・ブライア, Yūri Buraia)	Kensho Ono	Dallas Reid
Henry Henderson (ヘンリー・ヘンダーソン, Henrī Hendāson)	Kazuhiro Yamaji	Barry Yandell
Damian Desmond (ダミアン・デズモンド, Damian Dezumondo)	Natsumi Fujiwara	Caitlin Glass
Becky Blackbell (ベッキー・ブラックベル, Bekkī Burakkuberu)	Emiri Katō	Dani Chambers
Snidel (スナイデル, Sunaideru)	Banjō Ginga	John Swasey
Type F (タイプF, Taipu F)	Shunsuke Takeuchi	Gabe Kunda
Domitri (ドミトリ)	Tomoya Nakamura	Phil Parsons
Luka (ルカ, Ruka)	Kento Kaku	Tyson Rinehart

== Production ==
The film was announced at the Jump Festa 2023 event in December 2022 with the supervision from Tatsuya Endo. In a presentation at the AnimeJapan 2023 event on 25 March 2023, it was announced that the film would be titled Spy×Family Code: White, and would be directed by Takashi Katagiri, screenplay by Ichirō Ōkouchi, and produced by Wit Studio and CloverWorks. On 12 September 2023, it was reported that Tomoya Nakamura and Kento Kaku would voice the movie-original villain duo for the movie named Dmitri and Luka, respectively. On 22 September 2023, it was announced that Banjō Ginga and Shunsuke Takeuchi was cast for the role of two other villains, Snidel and Type F.

On 30 October 2023, the anime social media released another movie trailer, which announced "Soulsoup" by Official Hige Dandism as the main theme song as well as the second ending theme. On the premiere day, they revealed the song "Why" (光の跡, Hikari no Ato; lit. "Traces of Light"), performed by Gen Hoshino, was used for the first ending theme.

== Marketing ==
On 2 July 2023, it was announced that the film would be having a collaboration project with Street Fighter 6. An illustration drawn by Capcom's illustrator and designer Chisato Mita was also revealed. On 4 December 2023, Capcom social media released the animated short video of Yor Forger and Street Fighter 6's character Chun-Li dueling on Suval'hal Arena stage. The animation was made by Wit Studio, with Shunsuke Aoki doing key animation and Kyōji Asano working on storyboard and character design. On 9 January 2024, Capcom revealed and released the in-game collab items, which are avatar costumes based on Yor's Thorn Princess dress and Loid Forger's signature dark cyan suit. Yor and Loid's hairstyles are also added to the avatar creation. Players who log in during the collaboration period, which lasted until 31 January, would receive free items like picture frames, stickers, and player titles. The Battle Hub area would also receive a temporary redesign to promote the movie.

On 10 July 2023, a collaboration project with the movie Mission: Impossible – Dead Reckoning Part One was announced. A parody poster illustration featuring the main characters of the anime replacing the Mission: Impossible cast was released with the announcement, as was a highlight video for Dead Reckoning Part One narrated by Code: White voice actors. On 19 December 2023, the collaboration project with the movie Wish was announced. A parody poster illustration featuring Anya and Bond Forger, which mirrors the Japanese theatrical release poster of Wish, and a combination trailer video were also released on the same day.

On the day of release, the Shibuya 109 department store erected a statue of Bond Forger nearby the statue of Hachikō adorned with the words "Chūken Bondo" (忠犬ボンド; lit. "Loyal Dog Bond"), with other statues soon appearing inside the department store and at Toho Cinemas Ikebukuro.

== Release ==
=== Theatrical ===
The film was released in theatres in Japan on 22 December 2023, including midnight screenings in nine theaters across five cities. On 9 January 2024, it was announced that nine cinemas in Tokyo, Kanagawa, Osaka, Nagasaki, and Okinawa would be screening the film with English subtitles on 19 January.

Crunchyroll has licensed the film and released it in North America on 19 April 2024 with both English subbed and dubbed versions. Neofilms released the film in Hong Kong on 1 February 2024. SMG Holdings, a Korean film distributor, plans to release the movie in Korea in March 2024. Southeast Asian film distributor Encore Films licensed and released the movie in Indonesia on 7 February, in Singapore on 8 February, and in Brunei on 14 March. CGV Cinemas released the film in Vietnam on 10 February 2024, the first day of Tết Holidays. Warner Bros. Pictures announced releases of the film on 22 February in Malaysia, 13 March in the Philippines, and 14 March in Thailand. Universal Pictures released the film in the Netherlands on 25 April.

The film was released in Belgium, France, and Switzerland on 17 April, Australia, New Zealand, and Mexico on 18 April, Canada, Spain, and the United States on 19 April, Austria and Germany on 23 April, Italy and the Caribbean on 24 April, select countries in South America, Central America, and Europe on 25 April, and the Balkans, Ecuador, Finland, Iceland, Norway, Sweden, Venezuela on 26 April, China on 30 April, Lithuania on 3 May, and India on 19 July.

A novel adaptation of the movie with the same name was published on 22 December 2023, the same day as the movie premiere. It is written by Aya Yajima, who also penned for another Spy × Family novel, "Spy × Family: Family Portrait". The novel was based on the plot of the movie, which is screenplay by Ichirō Ōkouchi.

4 million printed booklets named Spy × Family Code: White Film File were distributed in theaters in Japan, containing an original 8-page manga and original cover by Tatsuya Endo, and included interviews with Endo, animation staff, and voice actors. Beginning 13 January 2024, 500,000 AR illustration cards drawn by Tatsuya Endo were distributed, containing a QR code for displaying a 3D pop-out model of Anya Forger with voice lines.

=== Home media ===
Spy × Family Code: White began streaming on Crunchyroll in multiple subs and dubs on 5 September 2024, in select regions across America and Europe.

Muse Communication licensed the film, and began streaming on selected OTT platforms across South and Southeast Asia on September 2024, with multiple subs and dubs.

== Reception ==
=== Box office ===
Spy x Family Code: White grossed $40 million in Japan and $238.2 million in other territories, for a worldwide total of $246.3 million. It has earned a total of ¥6.32 billion (about US$40.2 million) in its run in Japanese theaters, making it the fourth highest-grossing Japanese film of 2024.

The film sold 866,436 tickets and earned 1.224 billion yen within the first three days (from 22 December to 24 December), which earned it the first position on Japanese box office ranking. The anime social media also reported that the satisfaction rate among the audiences is 93.6%. On the second weekend, the movie had retained its 1st position, by selling around 585,000 tickets and earning 800 million yen, bringing the total tickets sold up to 2.08 million for cumulative total of 2.8 billion yen in revenue. Later on 4 January, it was reported that the movie had sold 2.59 million tickets, earning more than 3.4 billion yen in revenue. As of Monday, 8 January, over the third weekend, the movie stayed at the first position in box office ranking and had sold 3.29 million tickets with a cumulative total of 4.41 billion yen in revenue.

In the United States, the film was released alongside Abigail and The Ministry of Ungentlemanly Warfare, and was projected to gross $5–8 million from 2,009 theaters in its opening weekend. The film made $2.2 million on its first day, including $670,000 from previews. It went on to debut to $4.9 million, finishing in fifth.

=== Critical response ===
On the review aggregator website Rotten Tomatoes, 94% of 34 critics' reviews are positive, with an average rating of 7.4/10. Metacritic, which uses a weighted average, assigned the film a score of 68 out of 100, based on eight critics, indicating "generally favorable" reviews. American audiences surveyed by CinemaScore gave the film an average grade of "A" on an A+ to F scale, while those polled by PostTrak gave it a 92% positive score.

Richard Eisenbeis from Anime News Network rated the movie B+ overall; he wrote that although they fell a bit in the story department due to "the lack of any impact on the over all Spy × Family story", the movie provides great action scenes and fun comedy, being a good entrance movie for everyone who wants to get into the series. Siddhant Adlakha of Variety wrote, "While the recurring gags rarely extend beyond poop jokes, kids in the audience will probably get a kick out of the whole affair. The film does try to be serious and sentimental at times – often to no avail – but at least it's never boring." The A.V. Club's Cindy White gave it an A− grade, saying that it "gets away with its plot contrivances and general silliness by never taking itself too seriously, and delivering plenty of genuine laughs (often courtesy of Anya's hilarious inner-monologue asides)."

Jan Lee of The Straits Times gave 4/5 stars, writing, "While there is no need to watch the series nor read the manga to understand the plot, Code: White... is not concerned with winning over new fans. It is made for people who already love its story." Abhishek Srivastava of The Times of India gave the film 3.5/5 stars, saying it "skilfully balances comedy, action, and suspense... While the first half unfolds at a relaxed pace, the second half ramps up to deliver engaging entertainment."

=== Accolades ===
In December 2024, Spy × Family Code: White was among the Top 100 Favorites nominated for the Anime of the Year at the Tokyo Anime Award Festival 2025.

Year	Award	Category	Recipient(s)	Result	Ref.
2025	Saturn Awards	Best Animated Film	Spy × Family Code: White	Nominated	
2025	Crunchyroll Anime Awards	Film of the Year	Spy × Family Code: White	Nominated	
2025	AnimaniA Awards	Best Movie: Cinematic Release	Spy × Family Code: White	Won	
2025	AnimaniA Awards	Best Director	Takashi Katagiri	Won	
2025	AnimaniA Awards	Best Studio	Wit Studio and CloverWorks	Won	
