= List of Spy × Family chapters =

Cover of the first 4 Japanese tankōbon volumes, featuring the Forger family members.

Spy × Family is a Japanese manga series written and illustrated by Tatsuya Endo. The series began serialization on the manga website Shōnen Jump+ on March 25, 2019. Its individual chapters have been collected in 18 tankōbon volumes, with the first having been released on July 4, 2019. The series is licensed for English-language release in North America by Viz Media, who published the first volume on June 2, 2020. As the series is published in Japan, it is also released simultaneously in English digitally on Viz Media's website.

The covers of the tankōbon features a main character resting on a designer's chair, surrounded by item(s) or characteristics that represent the character, their life and their personalities. The real life chairs were chosen by the author as he deemed fit with the character's personalities. For volume 10, Endo decides to forgo the inclusion of the designer chair motif to make the cover befit the volume's story.

== Volumes ==
No.	Original release date	Original ISBN	English release date	English ISBN
1	July 4, 2019	978-4-08-882011-8	June 2, 2020	978-1-9747-1546-6
Mission: 1–5
In order to counteract the warmonger movement from their hostile eastern neighboring country, Westalis sends the renowned spy Twilight to the city of Berlint in Ostania to conduct Operation Strix. The objective of the mission is to approach Donovan Desmond, President of the National Unity Party of Ostania, in order to extract any seditious information. The mission requires Twilight to establish a fake family, and put his "child" in the Eden Academy where he can safely approach the elusive Donovan through a school event for the elite students and their parents. Twilight creates an alias as the psychiatrist Loid Forger and adopts a kid from a shady orphanage named Anya, unaware that she is a telepath and a former test subject from a secret Ostanian project. After saving Anya from being kidnapped, Loid helps her pass the Eden entrance exam and learns that they need a "mother" to attend the school interview. They later meet Yor Briar, a Berlint City Hall employee who is in need of a pretend boyfriend; unbeknownst to Loid, Yor is a professional assassin named Thorn Princess. After helping and gaining an understanding for each other, Yor and Loid both propose and agree to be in a fake marriage. The newly formed Forger family prepares for the interview while struggling to adjust to their pretend family dynamic. On the day of the interview, the Forger family helps the school by stopping a herd of stampeding animals, earning the respect of Housemaster Henry Henderson. Their interview ends in apparent failure due to one of the interviewers, Housemaster Murdoch Swan, deliberately sabotaging it by distressing Anya, causing an enraged Loid to cut the interview short.: Cover character: Loid Forger/Twilight and the Grand Confort LC-2 Petit Modèle, designed by Le Corbusier
2	October 4, 2019	978-4-08-882120-7	September 1, 2020	978-1-9747-1724-8
Mission: 6–11; Extra Mission: 1
Anya is put on the school waiting list thanks to the intervention of Housemaster Henderson, and is admitted to Eden Academy soon after. Suggested by Franky, Loid's friend and informant, they hire a castle for Anya to roleplay her cartoon as a reward. Preparing for Phase 2 of Operation Strix, Loid arrives at the Westalian Intelligence Agency (WISE) safe house to meet with his handler Sylvia Sherwood. They discuss the upcoming plan, which requires Anya to obtain 8 Stella Stars, Eden Academy's merit badges, so she can join the elite student group of Imperial Scholars, while avoiding the demerit Tonitrus Bolts. Loid also prepares a "Plan B", which is getting Anya to befriend her classmate Damian Desmond, Donovan's second son, in hope of gaining access to Donovan this way. On the orientation day, Anya punches Damian after enduring his bullying, earning her first Tonitrus and completely foiling both of Loid's plans. Damian later experiences his first crush on Anya when she apologizes to him, but he internally denies it vehemently. Although Anya is ostracized at school, she finds a new friendship in Becky Blackbell. Meanwhile, Yor's brother, Yuri Briar, who works for Ostanian counter-intelligence State Security Service (SSS), learns of the marriage between Loid and Yor and demands a visit. In a side story, the family visits an aquarium while Loid tries to balance his overburdening spy missions and family life.: Cover character: Anya Forger and the Marshmallow Sofa, designed by Irving Harper of Herman Miller Inc.
3	January 4, 2020	978-4-08-882183-2	December 1, 2020	978-1-9747-1816-0
Mission: 12–17; Extra Mission: 2
Loid and Yor welcome Yuri into their home, and try to fool him into believing and accepting their family. Loid skillfully deduces Yuri's true occupation as a SSS Officer but accidentally makes Yuri skeptical about the legitimacy of their marriage. After demanding the couple to kiss and stopping it himself, Yuri goes home injured, begrudgingly acknowledging but still opposing his sister's marriage. Now learning about Yuri's work, Loid harbors doubts about Yor, but soon clears it up after secretly testing her and observing her sincerity. The semester goes on and the kids are trying to get Stella Stars, believing in false rumors like they can earn these merits from the PE class' dodgeball tournament. After multiple failed attempts to train Anya in academic, art, and sport subjects, Loid volunteers them for community service at a hospital, hoping she can earn a Star this way. Although Anya is soon dismissed due to her negligence, she rescues a young patient drowning in the pool thanks to her telepathy, earning her the first Stella Star of her grade. At Becky's suggestion, Anya asks for a pet dog as a reward. In a shady location somewhere, a caged white dog suddenly perceives the images of the Forger family in his mind. In a side story, Loid and Yor have a date while Yor is still injured from her recent assassin job, with Anya and Franky tailing them.: Cover character: Yor Forger/Thorn Princess and the La Chaise, designed by Charles and Ray Eames
4	May 13, 2020 (Note: Volume 4 was delayed from May 1 to May 13 due to the COVID-19 pandemic.)	978-4-08-882229-7	March 2, 2021	978-1-9747-2103-0
Mission: 18–23; Short Mission: 1–2
When the Forger family is out looking a suitable dog for Anya, Loid is called away by WISE for a sudden urgent mission: protecting the visiting Westalian minister from a terrorism plot by a radical Berlint university student group led by Keith Kepler. Keith plans to use intelligent dogs from an abandoned government experiment project to carry bombs to assassinate the minister, in order to incite conflict between the two countries once again. Anya chases after a white dog whose mind she accidentally read and saw a vision of the Forgers. She stumbles upon the terrorists and gets captured by them. Escaping with the white dog, she discovers that the white dog can see into the future. Glimpsing into another future vision, Anya finds out that Loid is about to be killed in an explosion and rushes to save him with the dog, making Yor chase after them. Thanks to their intervention, Loid is able to escape a bomb trap and capture most of the terrorist group, except for Keith who still possesses one more bomb dog. Loid disguises himself as the minister and safely diverts the explosive device into the river, saving the bomb dog. Keith tries to flee, just to be apprehended by an angry Yor. The family reunites with the white dog in tow. Anya demands the adults to let her adopt the dog to which they accede. Anya later names her new dog Bond, after her cartoon hero Bondman, and tries to use Bond to get closer to Damian, to no avail. In the short stories, Anya plays the make-believe spy game with her parents, and Franky employs Loid's help to ask a girl out just to end in failure.: Cover character: Bond Forger and the Ball Chair, designed by Eero Aarnio
5	September 4, 2020	978-4-08-882463-5	June 1, 2021	978-1-9747-2294-5
Mission: 24–30; Short Mission: 3
Sometime after adopting Bond, Yor asks her co-worker, Camilla, to teach her how to cook, and after many failed attempts, she succeeds in replicating her mother's stew. Damian tries to get his father's recognition by winning first prize in a paper model contest, with the disastrous help from Anya. The midterm is coming and Anya realizes her telepathy will be disabled on the day of the exam. Yor invites Yuri over to tutor Anya for the exam but he gives up halfway out of frustration, however, he successfully makes Anya realize the importance of learning. Afraid of the possibility of Anya receiving multiple Tonitrus Bolts by failing the exam, Loid infiltrates the school to fix Anya's answer sheets before the grading takes place. He discovers that an amateur spy, Daybreak, is trying to sabotage the Desmond brothers' exam sheets. After fixing Daybreak's sabotage, he finds Anya passed the exam through her own efforts, although just barely. For his achievement in the exam, Damian receives a well-deserved Stella Star. George Glooman, Anya and Damian's classmate and Daybreak's employer, launches another plan to get Damian expelled because of a misunderstanding about their families' business. Damian, Anya, and their classmates take sympathy on George's circumstances, but soon learn about the truth, causing George a large amount of embarrassment. A couple days after Anya's hospital visit for her observation homework, Fiona Frost, Loid's co-worker at the hospital and WISE agent Nightfall, visits the Forgers' home to give Loid information for their upcoming joint mission. In secret, Fiona plots to replace Yor out of her unrequited and fervent love for Loid. In the short story, Bond destroys Anya's penguin toy out of jealousy and tries to apologize to her.: Cover character: Yuri Briar and the Barcelona Chair, designed by Ludwig Mies van der Rohe and Lilly Reich
6	December 28, 2020	978-4-08-882545-8	October 5, 2021	978-1-9747-2513-7
Mission: 31–37; Short Mission: 4
Loid and Fiona infiltrate an underground tennis competition in order to obtain an illusive dossier from a late Ostanian Colonel, which is rumored to be able to reignite the war. They absolutely dominate the competitions thanks to their competence and adaptability, boosted by Fiona's zeal to gain Loid's affection. Using their quick wit to deceive the SSS at the last moment, they are able to obtain the dossier, but it turns out just to be the late Colonel's starlet photo collection. On the way home from their mission, Fiona sees Yor and Anya playing tennis in the park, and despite the warning from Loid, requests for a tennis match against Yor. The match soon ends with Yor completely decimating Fiona due to her absurd strength, but Yor remains upset about Loid and Fiona's relationship. Days later, sensing Yor's unease, Loid asks her out on a date to clear her doubts about his "unfaithfulness". Although the date ends in disaster, they reaffirm their irreplaceable partnership in their fake marriage and pretend family. Thinking that Anya has a crush on Damian, Becky books an exclusive shopping store visit for Anya and her to dress up, helping the girls deepen their friendship. Sometime later, the Imperial Scholar event is held at the Academy, in which Donovan Desmond participates with his eldest son, Demetrius. Encouraged by Anya, Damian is able to meet his father after the event. Loid cleverly utilizes that opportunity to crash the Desmond family meeting and meet face-to-face with his target for the first time. In the short story, Housemaster Henderson's elegant start to his day is spoiled by the students' petty squabbles.: Cover character: Fiona Frost/Nightfall and the Heart Cone Chair, designed by Verner Panton
7	June 4, 2021	978-4-08-882669-1	April 5, 2022	978-1-9747-2848-0
Mission: 38–44; Short Mission: 5
An enigmatic and inscrutable Donovan evades most of Loid's attempts to obtain information, but Loid is able to defend Damian's feelings and make Donovan recognize Loid personally. After Loid retreats, Damian gathers courage to tell Donovan about his achievements and receives faint praise from his father. The holidays arrive and Damian exhausted himself staying up late for study. Knowing this, Housemaster Henderson asks their house custos, Mr. Green, to take Damian and his friends, Emile and Ewen, to go camping to relax under the guise of punishment. At the Forger house, Bond predicts his own death because of Yor's dinner and, determined to make Loid get home early so he can cook instead, helps him in an infiltration mission. Elsewhere, Yuri is working hard to capture an anti-government extremist journalist, but still shows his empathy to the latter's helpless father. At school, the kids play Old Maid games to determine who will get the "magic" macarons that are rumored to make whoever eats them smarter. After helping Franky find a lost cat, Yor is summoned by the Shopkeeper, the leader of her assassin organization Garden. She is tasked to protect a former mobster wife and her baby who are attempting to flee the country on the Princess Lorelei cruise ship after their family was wiped out. Yor questions herself on the reason she has continued to be an assassin and plans for this to be her last mission as Thorn Princess. Loid and Anya coincidentally win a trip for two on the same cruise in a raffle, and the three of them decide to take the cruise trip together. In the short story, Sylvia and Loid meet each other for their routine intel exchange.: Cover character: Damian Desmond and the Willow Chair, designed by Charles Rennie Mackintosh
8	November 4, 2021	978-4-08-882843-5	September 20, 2022	978-1-9747-3427-6
Mission: 45–53; Short Mission: 6
Under the guise of a City Hall's business trip on the Princess Lorelei cruise, Yor and her supervisor, Mathew McMahon, meet and assist their escort targets, Olka Gretcher, her son Gram, and her friend Zeb (disguised as the Grey family) from the assassins sent by the usurper Leonardo Hapoon. Despite the plan to lie low and escape in two days via a small boat, they are quickly discovered and attacked on the first night. The assassins decide to join forces after realizing the capabilities of the Garden's operatives. Yor quickly moves all of them to a safer place while dispatching their pursuers. Thanks to Anya's quick thinking, Yor is able to evade Loid's notice. Meanwhile, Loid has trouble with the concept of relaxing and treats the trip as a serious mission, receiving much chagrin from Anya, who tries to distract him with various activities so she can secretly help Yor. On the night of the rendezvous, they plan their escape under the distraction of the fireworks, but are lured to the rooftop deck where all of the assassins are waiting. Yor is able to fight back after receiving assistance from McMahon and putting the targets into a safe hiding place. The two Garden operatives massacre most of their foes but are stopped and brought down by a formidable shirasaya-wielding assassin. Steeling herself with new-found determination, Yor stands up again, fighting the assassins barehanded. In the short story, Yuri catches a cold and dreams about his childhood days with Yor.: Cover character: Franky Franklin and the Eames Lounge Chair and Ottoman, designed by Charles and Ray Eames
9	April 4, 2022	978-4-08-883076-6	March 21, 2023	978-1-9747-3628-7
Mission: 54–61
After the firework show, Anya sneaks on to the top deck by herself and secretly assists Yor in retrieving her weapon, giving Yor the chance to eliminate her last foe. Meanwhile, multiple bombs planted by an assassin are discovered throughout the ship, putting Loid to work to dismantle them. Yor bids goodbye to Olka Gretcher before she, Gram, and Zeb escape on a smaller boat to a foreign country. The Forgers reunite the next day at a recreation port. They take part in several family activities and make happy memories before finally going back home to Bond. Back at school, Anya tries to brag and fib about her cruise trip to her rich classmates and earns an embarrassing lesson. On a day out, Loid is struggling to train Bond to be a guard dog when they stumble upon a house fire, after which they rescue a dog and successfully apprehend the arsonist thanks to Bond's precognition power. Afterwards, Loid assures Bond of his worth as a Forger family member, regardless of his capabilities and shortcomings. Later, Becky visits Anya's house with the intent of seducing Loid, who she's developed a crush on, but concedes when she witnesses Yor's strength. Fiona uses Franky's connections to employ the help of a counterfeiter for her mission. At Eden Academy, Anya saves Damian from earning an unjust Tonitrus Bolt from the sadistic teacher Donna Schlag in a bag inspection, at the cost of her getting her second Bolt, making Loid faint when he receives the news.: Cover character: Becky Blackbell and the Coconut Chair, designed by George Mulhauser of Herman Miller Inc.
10	October 4, 2022	978-4-08-883127-5	October 17, 2023	978-1-9747-4067-3
Mission: 62–66; Short Mission: 7–8
While unconscious, Twilight dreams of his childhood, when he was called by the nickname Advisor and living in the town Luwen, in an Eastern Westalis province with his parents and friends. Traumatized by the death of his parents when the Westalis-Ostania war started, he grew up and enlisted. Later, he met and spared the life of Franky, who was then a deserted Ostanian soldier, and reunited with his surviving childhood friends before they were killed in a botched attack operation. The incidents made him acknowledge his own helplessness and inability stemming from ignorance, and later accept the recruitment for spy training. Waking up from his fainting, Loid calmly advises Anya about the importance of friendship, assuring her about the Tornitrus Bolt. A couple days later, on a mission of protecting a renowned Ostanian opera singer, Sylvia gives an inexperienced spy an important lesson about information control and assessment. Housemaster Henderson asks Anya to help him afterschool, and teaches her the importance of being diligent in learning with moderate success. Yor is introduced to Damian's mother, Melinda Desmond, after rescuing her at the mall and joining her in a volleyball match. Loid encourages Yor to befriend and be part of Melinda's circle as part of his newly-established "Plan C" of Operation Strix, inadvertently forcing Anya to aggressively attempt to be friends with Damian. In the short stories, the in-universe fictional Bondman makes his way through the missions flirting with multiple ladies, and the duo of Franky and Bond try to woo a girl and her dog in the park.: Cover character: Child Twilight/Advisor, sitting on the rubbles of a destroyed building
11	April 4, 2023	978-4-08-883313-2	March 19, 2024	978-1-9747-4329-2
Mission: 67–75
Loid's front as a psychiatrist is put at risk when the hospital's chief medical director, Gerald Gorey, decides to falsely accuse him of espionage to the SSS. Having predicted this, Loid, Fiona, and Franky execute a plan to dissuade Gerald by exposing his scheme and having Loid stand on his defense in order to earn his gratitude. A day after Yor injured her wrists during her assassin job, Yuri pays a visit and puts Loid into a contest to see who can take care of Yor better. Anya participates in a school excursion to the museum, when the bus carrying her and her friends is hijacked by the remnant members of the extremist group "Red Circus", led by Billy Squire. Reading the hijackers' minds, Anya convinces Damian and Becky to help send a message of their destination out to the police, resulting in Billy putting fake bomb collars on her and Damian, and barricading everyone inside the bus. Yuri tracks down the second captured bus and rescues the children there, cornering the hijackers on Anya's bus and forcing them to attempt to detonate a real bomb when the SSS force charges in. Knowing this, Anya tries to persuade Billy with her clumsy and childlike speech, inadvertently reminding Billy of his deceased daughter and her conviction, making him surrender. For their bravery during the incident Anya, Damian, Becky, and Bill Watkins are rewarded a Stella Star each. When the kids were reuniting with their families, Anya read into Melinda's mind when she came to pick up Damian; her thoughts oscillating between loving and hateful thoughts about her son, triggered by the mention of Donovan.: Cover characters: Emile Elman and Ewen Egeburg with the Hill House Chair, designed by Charles Rennie Mackintosh
12	October 4, 2023	978-4-08-883675-1	August 6, 2024	978-1-9747-4705-4
Mission: 76–84; Short Mission: 9–10
After the bus hijacking incident, the Eden kids gain respect for Anya, leading to Anya acting arrogant and starting a petty squabble with Damian before class. The Tutor-in-resident of Cecil Hall, Thomas Austin, has a psychiatric counselling session with Loid, who helps him realize that his mental problems are originated from his unhappy marriage. An information-exchange meeting between Loid and Sylvia turns into a playdate for Bond and Aaron, the former bomb dog who was adopted by Sylvia. Yor, being drunk and fueled by her co-workers, overthinks about having gripes in marriage and starts an irrational argument with Loid, confusing and worrying Loid greatly. Loid and Yuri are then called by their agencies due to a common urgent situation: a mole stationed at WISE HQ in Westalis named Winston Wheeler is fleeing back to Ostania with the West's crucial information. Arriving at the border town Shellbury where Winston is hiding, Loid tries to stall for time by disguising as Winston and rendezvousing with the SSS, while Fiona's team looks for Winston. The SSS sees through Loid's disguise, forcing him to escape into the sewer system. Yuri catches up to him (while he's disguised as Yuri) and the two engage in a deadly fight, ending with Loid incapacitating Yuri and sparing his life. Above, Fiona lures Winston out of his hiding place, recovering the data but letting him escape into the sewer. Loid, already injured in the fight with Yuri, is brought down by Winston there shortly, before Fiona catches up with them and executes a profound anger seeing the situation. In the short stories, Loid employs Franky's help to make an educational Spy Wars cartoon, which bores Anya, and the Space Race starts a connection between Ewen and Anya, who love space adventures in their own ways.: Cover character: Sylvia Sherwood/Handler and the Diamond chair (No. 421), designed by Harry Bertoia
13	March 4, 2024	978-4-08-883839-7	January 14, 2025	978-1-9747-5198-3
Mission: 85–92; Short Mission: 11
Loid and Fiona aprehend Winston and take him into custody. Back at the Forger's house, Yuri suspects Loid of being Twilight for a moment, but gives up on the idea when he checks on Loid's arm and fails to find the injury he made on Twilight's arm. To thank Anya for her help during the handkerchief incident, Damian buys some deserts to present her, but Becky, Emile, and Ewan keep following the duo to eavesdrop on them, until they are brought to Henderson and eat the desserts together. Still disheartened for failing to capture Twilight, Yuri is scolded by his junior, Chloe, making him regain his composure not only for his sake, but for his sister's as well. During a walk with Bond, Yor and Anya meet a lost old man with memory issues and help him reunite with his wife at his home, which is coincidentally in the same building where they live. Yor and her co-workers attend a charity event for veterans, and Mille begins arguing with some women regarding her father, who died in the war, but the situation is diffused when Melinda appears. With the term finals around the corner, both Anya and Damian study hard, seeking to rank among the best in their classes during tests to earn additional Stella Stars. In a short story, Anya makes a doorplate with her name, but replaces it when Loid points out that she spelled her name wrong.: Cover characters: Yor's coworkers Camilla, Millie, and Sharon with the Tulip chair, designed by Eero Saarinen
14	September 4, 2024	978-4-08-884154-0	August 5, 2025	978-1-9747-5600-1
Mission: 93–99; Short Mission: 12–13
Term final exam results are posted; Becky places 38th overall and Anya is 168th, a marked improvement from her original 213th. She is awarded both a Stella (for Classical Language) and a Tonitrus (for Math), an unprecedented outcome. Damian's older brother Demetrius wins six Stella Stars for academics, but his mind appears blank to Anya. As a reward, the Forger family goes skiing, but they are stranded by a blizzard and spend the night in a lodge, where they hear the legend of the Red Snowman. Overnight, one of the guests is stabbed by a frozen carrot and Anya quickly solves the closed circle mystery when the lodge owner, Rodger Hostman, mentally gloats that no one suspects him; Loid uses her tip to prevent a second attack. Eden Academy prepares for the end of term gala, a party for all classes in a single year; trivia and appraisal competitions are held as icebreakers before the students maneuver for dance partners. Damian's henchmen stage a contest for his potential partners; Anya wins and they share an awkward dance in which she confesses to be able to read minds, though Damian doesn't believe her. Meanwhile, Henry Henderson dances with Martha Marriott, Becky's governess, leading to a flashback to their time together as students at Eden. After they grow close over shared interests, Henry graduates, then returns as a student teacher while Martha enters her 13th year. When she hears the ballet company she was aiming to join disbanded due to the war, she volunteers for the Women's Defense Auxiliary; while she trains, they begin a regular correspondence, and Henry's fondness increases. As the war drags on, Martha volunteers to join a new combat battalion and Henry, shocked, writes a letter urging her to come back safely, but the news reports the battalion was wiped out. Henry protests the war and is jailed for sedition; he is released after he recants and is forced to marry. Martha, injured, wakes up near the Ostania border. In the short stories, Becky and Anya shop for dresses together, and Bond brings peace offerings to the giant stuffed penguin.: Cover characters: Housemaster of Cecil Hall at Eden Academy Henry Henderson with a Robie House dining chair, designed by Frank Lloyd Wright
15	March 4, 2025	978-4-08-884337-7	December 2, 2025	978-1-9747-5917-0
Mission: 100–108; Short Mission: 14
Martha is saved by a Westalis citizen and returns to Ostania after the war ended, tearfully reuniting with her family and, shortly after, Henry, but her plan to confess her love is derailed when she learns he had gotten married a month ago. Henry's in-laws were involved in post-war reconstruction, including funding a new ballet company, giving her a chance to dance again. Back in the present day, Martha and Henry meet at his wife's grave. When Anya learns about Belle, a Nordic seal stranded in the Eber River, she insists on visiting, where she sees Becky, and Yor helps Belle back to the ocean; Loid and Yor share a quiet moment together. For their vacation, Damian and his henchmen go treasure hunting, hoping to win a Stella for their discoveries. He returns home, disappointed; the Desmond butler gently observes Damian is avoiding being home alone. After being paid, Franky's planned date at the movies with Priscilla is derailed by having to rescue an informant. The entire Desmond clan gathers for a rare dinner together, filled with awkward silences; patriarch Donovan pronounces it "a most worthwhile evening", confusing Damian. At the annual Berlint Winter Sheep Festival, Loid feverishly chases potential social alliances. Anya and Yor visit a rookie fortuneteller, who is Melinda in disguise. After swearing them to secrecy, Melinda fumbles through a reading for Anya, who sees that Melinda both loves and resents her son, and fears her husband. Afterwards, Yor convinces Melinda to see Loid professionally. In the short mission, Becky and Anya watch the romantic movie "Berlint in Love" with Yor and Martha.: Cover characters: Butler of the Blackbell family Martha Marriott with The Peacock Chair, designed by Hans J. Wegner
16	October 3, 2025	978-4-08-884527-2	September 1, 2026	978-1-9747-6852-3
Mission: 109–118; Short Mission: 16
During the intake session, Melinda confesses to Loid that she believes Donovan is an alien, explaining that he can read minds, a change she noticed after their first child was born. Loid is skeptical but curious, and Anya learns that Donovan shares her power. Anya dreams of her mother; on waking, she asks Yor for potato gratin. On the first day of the new term, the students at Eden are reassigned to new classes based on their exam results, separating academically deficient Anya from Becky and Damian; in Science Class F, Anya meets Prince Tertius of Septevia and Freddy, who tries to erase a social faux pas and nearly sparks a war, which Anya manages to defuse, winning the admiration of both boys and leaving Damian seeking therapy for unfamiliar emotions of jealousy and envy. Damian's manifestation of a "paradise fist" wins over Anya. Yuri dines with Yor, sharing fond memories and checking their happiness. SSS Director Wilker visits the Shopkeeper, who assigns Hemlock, Yor, and Director Matthew McMahon to stop the poaching of Miteran Elk. Yor asks Matthew about his marriage to a civilian en route to the mission; they ambush the poachers and leave one alive to trail back to the poachers' camp. Yor is left behind to deal with an enraged elk and a mutinous Hemlock, who is convinced his self-imposed isolation and social solitude has made him stronger than her, and he attempts to "prune" her for becoming "a weak make-out merrymaker"; however, Yor overwhelms him when he threatens her family, and she drags him along to continue the mission. The gardening team easily wipe out the poachers at their camp after Yor assists Hemlock, who eventually snaps out of his dazed state. Driving back, McMahon states he hopes his wife will eventually learn and understand his clandestine, patriotic activities, prompting Yor to have a frank conversation with Loid. In the short mission, McMahon promises to bring back souvenirs for his wife Maureen.: Cover characters: Melinda Desmond with Red and Blue Chair, designed by Gerrit Rietveld
17	April 3, 2026	978-4-08-885009-2	—	—
Mission: 119–127; Short Mission: 15, 17-18
Yor asks Loid out for a date, but is short with him because of the pain from the wounds inflicted by Hemlock, so Loid assumes she is dissatisfied with their sham relationship. She says she wants it to continue forever, and after he thanks her, she wonders if he also loves her. Anya ponders her relationship with Damian and declares he is still a "jerko"; at home after school, Yor asks Anya about Loid's history, then admits to Anya that she loves Loid, and internally vows to keep protecting her family. Yor bowls (violently) with Melinda's group; on the ride home, Melinda confesses that Loid's ability to see her truth is unsettling and Yor admits that she also fears that he might learn who she truly is. Later, Melinda gives Yor a notebook for Loid in which she documented her anxieties. Reviewing the notes, Loid finds a mysterious connection between Donovan Desmond and Professor Authen, but the Professor claims he only had casual contact with Desmond. That night, when his dementia temporarily clears, Professor Authen wonders if "the plan" has continued, how much Desmond knows, and if Anya is "test subject #7". At Eden, new classmate Connie invites Anya to visit the haunted old schoolhouse; through an escalation of bravado, Damian, Tertius, and others join the ghost hunt, but they flee in terror after finding it. The next day, Connie announces Mr. Henderson will be fired after being falsely accused of taking bribes. At his farewell event, Connie smells the distinctive holy water she splashed on the "ghost", and Anya overhears a gloating teacher's confession, so she and the other students return to the old schoolhouse to clear Henderson. Damian, Anya, and Becky find the ringleader is ex-Housemaster Swan, who is attempting to amass a fortune by selling admissions to Eden Academy. Their escape with incriminating evidence is aided by Madam Schlag and the students convince Henderson to rescind his resignation. Between the bus kidnapping and admissions bribery scandal, Eden Academy has developed a bad reputation. The group of ghost-hunting students each are awarded both a Stella Star for their help and a Little Rain (a minor demerit, symbolized by an open umbrella, which is not as negative as a Tonitrus) for visiting the old schoolhouse; as penance, they do chores around the school for a week. In the short missions, Loid accompanies hospital director Gorey to visit an ill Fiona, Bond tries to avoid the dismal day predicted by his blood type horoscope, and Donna Schlag is inspired to train as a kunoichi by Martha's military service.: Cover character: Madam Donna Schlag with the Flag Halyard Chair by Hans Wegner.
18	November 4, 2026	978-4-08-885268-3	—	—
Mission: 128–137; Short Mission: 19
Yor asks Loid out on another date to attend a taping of Five-Year Love Plan; Yuri finds a way to join them. An armed group hijacks the broadcast to announce their demand: they will re-shoot the ending of the series, which was changed at the last minute in the original broadcast. Loid becomes a set designer to avoid appearing on camera, Yuri becomes a director's assistant, and Yor stands in for an absent actress and wins an expanded role, taking advantage of her social awkwardness. Yuri panics when he sees the script call for someone to kiss her. Loid devises a plan to switch Yuri for Yor in the kissing scene, taking advantage of their family resemblances; Yuri's reactions and ad-libbing prove a hit with viewers and he grudgingly celebrates with Loid. After airing their preferred ending, the hijackers surrender and the hostages are freed. Yor confesses that she feared for Loid's life; Loid wonders if the mission is jeopardized by his emotions. Afterward, Loid unexpectedly accompanies Yuri to a party filled with his State Security Service co-workers, who grill him to decide if he is a worthy husband to Yor; Loid is torn between panic from being surrounded by enemies and the delight of learning new information. S.S.S. Director Wyland Wilker shows up, poorly disguised as a pizza delivery man, leaving Loid frantic. Yor arrives and rejects Loid's attempt to withdraw gracefully, so he tries to sedate her with a tranquilizer as a polite excuse to leave, but her reflexes and constitution prove insurmountable. Ultimately, both Loid and Wilker's staff manage to engineer an ending, but Loid faints shortly after returning home. Loid recuperates at the hospital under Fiona's watchful eyes; when Anya and Yor visit, the girl learns "hard-no mama"'s motives through her psychic powers and stubbornly trails Fiona through the hospital. Fiona learns that former Director Surjay will attend a neuroscience conference at the hospital, and goes to the garage, confirming that Surjay's classic T-603 is present, before she spots Donovan Desmond himself. In the short mission, Becky drafts Anya into a scheme to get scouted by a talent agent on Lindon Street.: Cover characters: Bill Watkins, Arnold Crowley, Connie, Tertius, and George Glooman sitting in colorful Ant Chairs by Arne Jacobsen.

=== Chapters not yet in tankōbon format ===
These chapters have yet to be published in a tankōbon volume. They were serialized on Shōnen Jump+.

- Mission: 138-144
