= List of Spy × Family characters =

The cover of Spy × Family's fan book, EYES ONLY, depicting the main characters: on the foreground, from left to right: Loid Forger, Bond Forger (lying on the ground), Anya Forger, Yor Forger; on the background, upper row: Franky Franklin, Sylvia Sherwood, Becky Blackbell, Henry Henderson; on the background, lower row: Fiona Frost, Ewen Egeburg, Damian Desmond, Emile Elman, Yuri Briar

Spy × Family, a manga series written and illustrated by Tatsuya Endo and later adapted to an anime with the same name, features a cast of characters who live in an alternate version of Cold War Germany. The story is set in two fictional neighboring countries: Westalis and Ostania, which are loosely based on East Germany and West Germany.^{[ch. 1]} The two countries recently established a fragile peace after a war.^{[ch. 1, 18–22, 41]}

The plot follows the Forger family, which consists of Loid, Yor, Anya, and Bond Forger. They create a "pretend family", staying together in unconventional circumstances for their ulterior motives and secrets. Loid Forger, whose real identity is the Westalian master spy codenamed Twilight, adopts an orphan telepathic girl named Anya and marries an Ostanian professional assassin Yor Briar; later, they adopt Bond, a precognitive dog, into their care.^{[ch. 1–2, 22]} The Forger family members, for the most part, are not aware of each others' secrets, but they accept the falsehood of their union. They willingly love and care for each other.^{[ch. 4, 10, 14, 24, 30]} The supporting cast includes their friends, relatives, colleagues, allies, and enemies.

== Forger family ==
Loid Forger (ロイド・フォージャー, Roido Fōjā) / Twilight (黄昏, Tasogare)

Voiced by: Takuya Eguchi (Japanese); Alex Organ (English)
Played by: Win Morisaki, Hiroki Suzuki, Genki Hirakata and Kento Kinouchi (adult), Eima Saitō, Kichinosuke Yonemoto, Sota Tago and Ryo Tokita (young) (Japanese musical adaptation)
An unnamed spy from Westalis with extraordinary combat, memory, and information processing capabilities.^{[ch. 1–2]} As a master of disguise, he uses various faces and names for each mission, though he is generally known by his code name "Twilight".^{[vol. 1: extras]} His most recent mission, Operation Strix, requires him to enroll a child in the prestigious Eden Academy to approach a prominent figure in Ostania's warmonger political party, Donovan Desmond.^{[ch. 1]} He subsequently camouflages himself as "Loid Forger", a psychiatrist at Berlint General Hospital, to create a false family by adopting Anya and marrying Yor, although he is ignorant of their hidden identities and talents.^{[ch. 1–3]} He recently succeeded in making a brief contact with Donovan Desmond, although it yielded minimal results due to Desmond's inscrutable and enigmatic personality.^{[ch. 37–38]}
Loid possesses many talents and skills in espionage and the other roles he has to play in his missions. Although he appears manipulative and pragmatic when accomplishing his missions,^{[ch. 1–2, 12, 14, 38]} he slowly reveals his soft side to his family, and as time passes, he grows to care for them genuinely, although he outwardly does not admit it.^{[ch. 4, 10, 14, 35, 56]}
As revealed later in the story, Twilight used to live with his parents in Luwen, Westalis, a town close to the Ostanian border. He lost his mother and close friends when the war started, and his father's whereabouts are unknown. He enlisted in the army and was recruited by Westalian Intelligence Agency to be trained in espionage under Sylvia Sherwood.^{[ch. 62]} At some point during his espionage career, he trained Nightfall and instilled her perfectionist and emotionless personality, which has lasted until now.^{[ch. 30]}
Anya Forger (アーニャ・フォージャー, Ānya Fōjā)

Voiced by: Atsumi Tanezaki (Japanese); Megan Shipman, Bryn Apprill (season 2, episodes 28–29) (English)
Played by: Risa Masuda, Aoi Ikemuda, Miharu Izawa, Miharu Fukuchi, Rana Izutani, Mirei Tsukino, Miyo Nishiyama, Nonoka Murakata, Kanau Kozano and Reika Mano (Japanese musical adaptation)
An orphan young girl who can read minds, Anya was adopted by Loid Forger early into Operation Strix's plan.^{[ch. 1]} As she is a very young child, Anya is very innocent and ignorant of the world around her.^{[ch. 1–2, 17]} Thanks to her ability, Anya is the only one who knows the true identity of her family members but she keeps the information for herself, being afraid that, if her adopted parents would discover her ability, they would abandon her. Anya frequently and secretly supports her parents with their missions.^{[ch. 1–3, 9, Extra 2, 47]}
Anya attends Eden Academy and tries to befriend Damian Desmond for Operation Strix but because of an altercation with Damian during orientation day, she has been shunned by the whole class but has found a friend in Becky Blackbell.^{[ch. 8–9, 17, 36]} She is unaware of Damian's feelings toward her and does not have a favorable impression of him but still tries to make friends with Damian as per her father's wishes.^{[ch. 9, 36–37, 42, 65]} Thus far, she has received 4 Stella and 3 Tonitrus, much to Loid's dismay about the latter.^{[ch. 8, 16, 61, 75, 93]}
Anya was originally an experimental human test subject dubbed "Subject 007" (被検体007, Hikentai Zero Zero Sebun; lit. "Test Subject 007"). She claimed to be six years old, although per Loid's assessment, she appears to be around age four or five. The only confirmed details of her past are her name, "Anya", and that she had been adopted by several families, only to be returned to the orphanage each time.^{[ch. 1]} Although she displays significant control in her mind-reading power, Anya cannot use it during a new moon or on numerous people's minds simultaneously.^{[ch. 3–4, 26]} Due to the trauma incurred when she was a test subject, she is not good at studying and usually refuses to do so, relying on her mind-reading ability to copy from others, although she appears to be talented in Classic Literature. (Note: Classic Literature is a fictional language in the series. It is written in Japan as "Kogo" (古語; lit. "Ancient Language"); in the anime, it is written as "Ancient Language". It is equivalent to Latin in the real world.)^{[ch. 1, 10, 26–27, 42]} She is quite flexible and quick-witted for a child her age. She also displays her bravery from time to time, such as saving a drowning child, standing up for her friends, and alerting Loid of a bomb trap, despite the danger to herself.^{[ch. 1, 16, 21, 28, 48]}
Yor Forger (ヨル・フォージャー, Yoru Fōjā) née Briar (ブライア, Buraia) / Thorn Princess (いばら姫, Ibara Hime)

Voiced by: Saori Hayami (Japanese); Natalie Van Sistine (English)
Played by: Fuka Yuduki, Mirei Sasaki, Sora Kazuki and Maaya Kiho (Japanese musical adaptation)
A 27-year-old professional assassin nicknamed "Thorn Princess", who has a day job as an employee at Berlint City Hall. She agrees to a fake marriage without knowing Loid's true background, as unmarried young women are suspected of being spies.^{[ch. 2]} She believes Loid's lie that Anya is Loid's biological daughter from a previous marriage and accepts the roles of Anya's step mother.^{[ch. 2–3]} In her everyday life, Yor is soft, caring, formally spoken and considerate to others but sometimes hindered by her airhead and absent-minded natures.^{[ch. 3, 24, 46, 65, 79]} Because of this, as well as her lack of communication and social skills, she has difficulties adjusting to the norm and thus is a frequent target of her coworker's bullying.^{[ch. 2, 14, 29, 79]} Despite all that, she always strives to be a good wife and mother for the Forgers, later developing romantic feelings for Loid.^{[ch. 9, 14, 35, 65, 87]}
Yor lost her parents early. She raised her younger brother Yuri by herself, and became an assassin for the assassin group Garden at a young age to earn a living for the both of them.^{[ch. 2, 12, 44, Short 6, 53]} Neither she nor her brother are aware of each other's true jobs.^{[ch. 11–14]} Recently, she met Melinda Desmond, Loid's target's wife, and was invited to join her circle of friends, "The Lady Patriot Society".^{[ch. 65–66]}
Yor is extremely powerful and tough, as being she can kick away a speeding car, dice a tennis ball with a racket, survive bullet wounds, and withstand lethal poisons.^{[ch. Extra 2, 22, 34, 65]} She is an expert in using knives and similar sharp weapons, as well as bare hand close-quarter combat. Her weapons of choice are needle-like stilettos; they are long, have no guard, and have a ring pommel, resembling a kunai.^{[ch. 2, 4, 51–54]} Yor is not good with basic household chores, particularly cooking; her homemade meals are bad to the point of being poisonous.^{[ch. 5, 14, 24, 40]} Despite being seemingly immune to poison and her own cooking, she gets drunk easily with a small amount of alcohol.^{[ch. 6, 13, 35]}
Bond Forger (ボンド・フォージャー, Bondo Fōjā)
Voiced by: Kenichirou Matsuda (Japanese); Tyler Walker (English)
The family's pet Pyrenean Mountain Dog, Bond was originally Project Apple's canine test subject named "Subject 8" (実験体8号, Jikkentai Hachi-gō; lit. "Experimental Subject no. 8").^{[ch. 17, 19, 22]} He can glimpse the future, a fact which is known and utilized only by Anya through her telepathy.^{[ch. 19–21]} He meets Anya and the Forger family when he was used in a terrorist bomb attack. Thanks to his ability he made contact and protected Anya, unknowingly saving Loid's life. He later was adopted by the Forgers and was named Bond by Anya, after Anya's favorite cartoon character in Spy Wars, Bondman.^{[ch. 17–23]}
He shows an unconditional love and steadfast loyalty to the Forgers, and is especially close to Anya.^{[ch. 23, 40, 58]} Thus, he displays jealousy when Anya shows affection toward others, even if it is a toy.^{[ch. Short 3]} He is resistant and hesitant to some advance forms of training because of his traumatic past in the Project Apple.^{[ch. 58]} Despite his easily-distracted nature, he is a smart and strong dog, and is capable of understanding his owners' instructions, recognizing dangers and taking down adult humans.^{[ch. 18–21, 40, 58, Short 8]} Bond dreads Yor's cooking after his future sight once showed him that it could kill him, and goes to great lengths to avoid it.^{[ch. 26, 40]} He also formed a bond with Franky over the times Franky has had to take care of him.^{[ch. 50, Short 8]}

== Eden Academy ==
Eden Academy (イーデン校, Īden Kō), or alternatively named Eden College (イーデン・カレッジ, Īden Karejji), (Note: "Eden Academy" is only used in Viz's English translation only. While other English media use "Eden College". The original texts in Japanese uses both Īden Kō (イーデン校; lit. "Eden Academy") and Īden Karejji (イーデン・カレッジ; lit. "Eden College").)^{[ch. 7]} is a highly prestigious private school located in Berlint, Ostania. The academy provides top-class education for a student body of approximately 2500 students, from age 6 to 19, covers from academic subjects, to sports and fine arts. The admission process is notoriously harsh, requiring applicants to pass both a difficult writing exam and a formal family interview. Once enrolled, students are put into one of their eight houses, (Note: In the Viz's English translation, "houses" are translated as "Hall" in the name, e.g. Cecil Hall. In the original Japanese texts, it is written as Kurasu (クラス; lit. "Class") (in place of "house") and Ryou (寮; lit. "Dormitory") (in place of "Hall", in "Cecil Hall").) and are given the choices to either stay in their expensive house dormitories or commute from home. Eden students are awarded with a Stella Star (星(ステラ), Sutera; Stella, lit. "Star") for distinctive academic or social achievements, but may also be punished with a Tonitrus Bolt (雷(トニト), Tonito; short for Tonitrus, lit. "Thunderbolt") for transgressions or failing tests. A student who obtains eight Stella Stars becomes a member of Eden Academy's elite students called Imperial Scholars (皇帝の学徒(インペリアル・スカラー), Inperiaru Sukarā), receiving preferential treatments and privileges, while those punished with eight Tonitrus Bolts are automatically expelled.^{[ch. 1–8]}

=== Students ===
Damian Desmond (ダミアン・デズモンド, Damian Dezumondo)
Voiced by: Natsumi Fujiwara (Japanese); Caitlin Glass (English)
A classmate of Anya in Cecil Hall and the second son of Donovan Desmond. Loid wants to get close to his father through him and has been pushing Anya into becoming friends with Damian.^{[ch. 8–9]} Since his father has an overwhelming authority, Damian works hard to gain his father's attention and approval.^{[ch. 15, 25, 37–39]} He is diligent in his studies, and excels in History, which is shown when he earns a Stella Star in the History midterm exam by placing 2nd in his grade.^{[ch. 25–26, 39]} He was formerly hostile and arrogant toward Anya but has gradually changed and developed feelings for her, thanks to her persistent effort of befriending and helping him.^{[ch. 8–9, 25, 42, 61]} After the bus hijack incident, Damian was rewarded his second Stella Star for his display of bravery when he attempted to take Anya's place as the bomb-collared hostage.^{[ch. 71, 75]} He got his third Stella Star for getting the highest score in History in his grade.^{[ch. 93]}
Damian stays in the dormitories of Cecil Hall, and always is seen together with his two closest friends/followers, Emile and Ewen.^{[ch. 8–9, 39]} Damian has an overachiever older brother named Demetrius Desmond, who is a part of the Imperial Scholars.^{[ch. 8, 37]} Damian rarely contacts anyone in his family, and only relays messages via his butler Jeeves (ジーブス, Jībusu). He appears to have a German Shepherd named Max (マックス, Makkusu) back home, and occasionally check up on him with Jeeves.^{[ch. 25, 76]}
Becky Blackbell (ベッキー・ブラックベル, Bekkī Burakkuberu)
Voiced by: Emiri Katō (Japanese); Dani Chambers (English)
Anya's best friend at school, and a Cecil Hall's first grader, who often tries to act more adult-like. Her father is the CEO of Blackbell Heavy Industries, a major military manufacturer and is always doting on her, giving her anything she wishes.^{[ch. 8, 17, 36]} She is usually seen in the care of her butler, Martha.^{[ch. 36–37, 59]} She also has a Yorkshire Terrier, which is a gift from her father, named Wiesel (ビーゼル, Bīzeru).^{[ch. 17]} She becomes Anya's friend after Anya's altercation with Damian on the first day of school in defense of Becky. However, due to her mature nature and insecurity, she initially sees herself more as Anya's caretaker, until Anya calls Becky her friend when they are shopping together, touching Becky.^{[ch. 8–9, 36–37]} She develops a innocuous but intense crush on Loid after seeing a picture of him that Anya had with her, and has been trying to get his attention unsuccessfully. Anya, meanwhile, is aware of the crush and is mostly dumbfounded by it. Although she sees Yor as a rival for Loid's affections, she admires Yor for her strength and has been tutored by Yor in martial art.^{[ch. 25, 36, 59, 61]} After the bus hijack incident, Becky was rewarded her first Stella Star for her action of informing the police the location where their hijacked buses were heading toward.^{[ch. 70, 75]}
Emile Elman (エミール・エルマン, Emīru Eruman)
Voiced by: Hana Sato (Japanese); Macy Anne Johnson (English)
Damian's classmate and one of his staunch followers. He is carefree, laidback and loves sweet food. He, Damian and Ewen are always seen together, and they are placed in the same dormitory of Cecil Hall. He and Ewen at first appeared to be Damian's underlings but later they started treating each other as equals and have been staying together through the hardships at the Eden Academy.^{[ch. 8–9, 37–39]} He and Ewen are not aware of Damian's feelings toward Anya and still pick on her every time they collide.^{[ch. 9, 23, Short 4, 61]}
Ewen Egeburg (ユーイン・エッジバーグ, Yūin Ejjibāgu)
Voiced by: Haruka Okamura (Japanese); Michelle Rojas (English)
Damian's classmate and one of his staunch followers. He seems to be brighter and more observant than he appears and dreams to become a cosmonaut in the future. He, Damian, and Emile are always seen together, and they are placed in the same dormitory of Cecil Hall. He and Emile at first appeared to be Damian's underlings but later they started treating each other as equals and have been staying together through the hardships at the Eden Academy.^{[ch. 8–9, 37–39]} He and Emile are not aware of Damian's feelings toward Anya and still pick on her every time they collide.^{[ch. 9, 23, Short 4, 61]} Although, Ewen seems to share a connection with Anya over their love for space travel romance.^{[ch. Short 10]}
George Glooman (ジョージ・グルーマン, Jōji Gurūman)
Voiced by: Shun Horie (Japanese); Jad Saxton (English)
The son of the CEO of Glooman Pharmaceuticals, and a first grader in Cecil Hall. Believing his family business was driven into bankruptcy by the Desmond Group and he would have to drop out as a result, he schemed to get Damian expelled, going as far as hiring the amateur spy Daybreak to fix Damian's exam answer sheet. The class took pity on him and bid him farewell on his last day. When the misunderstanding was cleared, he was still able to go to school the next day and has been ostracized by the entire class since.^{[ch. 27–28, 42, 69]}
Bill Watkins (ビル・ワトキンス, Biru Watokinsu)
Voiced by: Hiroki Yasumoto (Japanese); Jarrod Greene (English)
A first grader in Wald Hall and the son of a Major in the Ostanian Army. Nicknamed "Bazooka Bill" (魔弾のビル, Madan no Biru; lit. "Demon/Magic Bullet Bill") for not only his extremely stout physique but also his perceptive intellect, he has been dominating all of the sport tournaments since nursery school. Despite his strong mentality, he is prone to crying when facing failure and hardship like normal kids. He is well-liked by his classmates, and treats his peers considerately.^{[ch. 15]} After the bus hijack incident, Bill was rewarded his first Stella Star for his attempt to assuage the fright and panic of his schoolmates.^{[ch. 70, 75]} He got his second Stella Star by placing second in Maths in the First Term-Final Exams.^{[ch. 93]}
Demetrius Desmond (ディミトリアス・デズモンド, Dimitoriasu Dezumondo)
The first-born son of Donovan and Melinda Desmond, and the older brother of Damian Desmond. He attends Eden Academy and is a part of the Imperial Scholar student group.
Connie (コニー, Konī)
The only other girl from Class 3 in Science Class F with Anya; she has shoulder-length straight hair and large, dark-framed glasses. Because she believes in the occult, she tends to be a social outcast.
Arnold Crowley (アーノルド・クロウリー, Ānorudo Kurourī)
The top-scoring student in Classical Languages who ends up in Science F with Anya; he has dark hair styled in a conical shape. His deficient science score resulted from a belief in creationism, possibly due to influence from his father, who performs spiritual readings for Ostania's elites.
Tertius (テルティウス, Terutiusu)
The third prince of Septeva, a small northern country. He has jaw-length hair styled with crown-like peaks and resides in Specter Hall.
Freddy (フレディ, Furedi)
An ordinary boy with freckles who nearly precipitates a war with Tertius over a stray booger. He resides in Hamilton Hall.

=== Staff ===
Henry Henderson (ヘンリー・ヘンダーソン, Henrī Hendāson)
Voiced by: Kazuhiro Yamaji (Japanese); Barry Yandell (English)
Played by: Sōma Suzuki (Japanese musical adaptation)
A 65-year-old history teacher and the housemaster of Cecil Hall at Eden Academy. He used to hold a high position in the Academy but was demoted to teaching first-grade students after attacking fellow housemaster Swan in defense of the Forger family. He is also the homeroom teacher of Anya and her friends and oversees the dormitory where Damian and his friends reside. He is very passionate about "elegance" and hold his students and himself to a high standard. He seems to not be bothered by the demotion, intending to use the opportunity to educate and discipline the children to his standard.^{[ch. 5–7, 26, 39, Short 4]} He cares for every student's education and well-being and sometimes went as far as putting himself in danger to protect his students.^{[ch. 39, 64, 72]} He is an acquaintance of Martha Marriott, the butler of Becky Blackbell, and seems to know her well.^{[ch. 72]} Later, it is revealed that he was her upperclassman and later teacher (beginning the job when he was 22 and she was 19). Both harbored feelings for the other, but neither could admit them. Due to the outbreak of the war, Martha enlisted in the military, and was later presumed killed in action. In grief and anger, Henry disrupted an enlistment event at Eden Academy, leading to his arrest by the military. His father bailed him out of jail and ordered him to return to his teaching job, arranging a marriage for him as well. Henry, believing Martha to be dead, married the unknown woman, Lucia. During this time, he was one of Donovan Desmond's teachers.^{[Ch. 97–102]}
Murdoch Swan (マードック・スワン, Mādokku Suwan)
Voiced by: Jin Urayama (Japanese); Christopher Wehkamp (English)
A 47-year-old economics teacher and also the Housemaster of Cline Hall. He is the only son of the former Headmaster of Eden Academy and was hired because of nepotism. He is callous, arrogant and generally uncouth. Recently, he went through a divorce in which his wife took full custody of their daughter, making him angry wherever he encounters another happy family. After sabotaging the Forger family's interview with his underhanded questions, an enraged Henderson incapacitated him in defense of the Forger family.^{[ch. 5]}
Walter Evans (ウォルター・エバンス, Worutā Ebansu)
Voiced by: Hiroshi Yanaka
A 59-year-old native language teacher and also the Housemaster of Malcom Hall. He is gentle, reliable and loved by his students. Along with Henry Henderson and Murdoch Swan, he interviewed the Forgers.^{[ch. 5]}
Donna Schlag (ドナ・シュラーグ, Dona Shurāgu)
An extremely rigorous schoolteacher, who is a member of Eden Academy's disciplinary committee. She takes pleasure in giving Tonitrus Bolts to students, for even the most minor and unfounded infractions, under the claim that even minor mistakes must be avoided at any cost for the sake of their future. The students are understandably scared of her, calling her Old Lady Tonitrus (トニトおばさん, Tonito Obasan) and spreading along the rumor that she has expelled over 100 students. She has an assistant named Rahden (ラーデン, Rāden), who helps carrying her box of Tonitrus Bolts. She is responsible for Anya's second Tonitrus Bolt.^{[ch. 61]}
Benedict Ivan Goodfellow (ベネディクト・アイヴァン・グッドフェラー, Benedikuto Aivan Guddoferā)
Voiced by: Yōhei Tadano
The current headmaster of Eden Academy. According to some facility members, he is a righteous and upstanding person, who cannot be bought with bribery. He gave the welcoming speech to students at the school entrance ceremony.^{[ch. 5, 8, 27]}
Green (グリーン, Gurīn)
Voiced by: Hiroshi Shirokuma
The dormitory custos of Cecil Hall. He wears an eyepatch over his left eye and has a large scar from under the eyepatch across face. He used to be in the Navy, which allows him to acquires several necessary survival skills. He took Damian, Ewen and Emile on a camping trip as requested by Henderson.^{[ch. 39]} He later escorted the buses of the Eden first-year students and quickly realized that the buses were in danger. He gave chase but were stopped short by a gunshot to his car tire, apparently receiving no injury.^{[ch. 69–70]}
Thomas Austin (トーマス・オースティン, Tōmasu Ōsutin)
Voiced by: Hiroki Gotō
The tutor-in-resident of Cecil Hall. He is a soft-spoken and nice person and has been teaching for 30 years. He experienced various mental symptoms after the bus-hijacking incident. After attending Loid's counselling sessions, he realized that those mental health issues have actually stemmed from his unhappy marriage and the fear of his wife. He later has taken steps to confront his fear and fix his marital problems.^{[ch. Short 4, 69, 72, 76–77]}

== WISE ==
The Westalis Intelligence Services' Eastern-Focused Division <W.I.S.E.> (西国(ウェスタリス)情報局対東課＜WISE(ワイズ)＞, Wesutarisu Jōhōkyoku Taihigashika <Waizu>) is the Westalian spy agency Twilight works for, whose main objective is to counter any initiatives within Ostania that may threaten the peace between both countries.^{[ch. 1, 6–7]}

Sylvia Sherwood (シルヴィア・シャーウッド, Shiruvia Shāuddo) / Handler (管理官(ハンドラー), Handorā)
Voiced by: Yūko Kaida (Japanese); Stephanie Young (English)
Played by: Manato Asaka and Haruka Manase (Japanese musical adaptation)
Twilight's handler and main contact at WISE, who gives him most of his missions and oversees Operation Strix. She works as an attaché and secretary in the Westalian embassy in Ostania as a front for her main job as the commanding officer of the Ostanian WISE agency. She is called "Fullmetal Lady" (鋼鉄の淑女(フルメタル・レディー), Furumetaru Redī) by her agents due to her exceptional abilities and personality. She tends to give her agents a hard time and overworks them, especially Twilight, whom she directly trained when he joined the espionage work. Her training was apparently harsh and traumatic for Twilight, which he still remembers until this day. Sylvia is extremely competent and reliable, being able to trick SSS agents and apprehend terrorists by herself; although she admits that overexerting takes a toil on her body.^{[ch. 63]} She once had a family, with her husband and young daughter, but what happened to them is unknown. After the bomb dog terrorism incident, she adopted Keith Kepler's German Shepherd and named him Aaron (アーロン, Āron).^{[ch. 78]}
Fiona Frost (フィオナ・フロスト, Fiona Furosuto) / Nightfall (夜帷, Tobari)
Voiced by: Ayane Sakura (Japanese); Lindsay Seidel, Bryn Apprill (season 1, episode 21) (English)
Played by: Nonoka Yamaguchi (Japanese musical adaptation)
An intelligence agent code-named "Nightfall", Twilight's espionage partner and coworker at Berlint General Hospital, where she works as an undercover clerk. Possessing an athletic physique and a cunning mind, she is shown to be a capable and proficient spy. She was trained by Twilight and has been following his teachings to an extreme ever since, hiding all of her emotions and making people see her as a ruthless opportunist, readily resorting to do anything to achieve her goal. In reality, she harbors strong feelings for Twilight, and is prepared to do anything to appeal to him, of which Sylvia has been aware. Thanks to her feelings towards Twilight, she is capable of surpassing her limit at the cost of serious self-inflicted injuries. She believes Yor is unworthy and wishes to replace her as Twilight's wife in Operation Strix. Anya is aware of her true nature and is wary of her because of her Spartan method of training children. She has recently been an aquantaince of Franky and frequently asks information from him.
WISE Attendant
Voiced by: Hiroki Gotō
A veteran agent who seems to be a close associate and assistant to Sylvia. He sometimes appears on the field to assist Loid and Sylvia in big missions, getting himself in dangerous and life-threatening situations in the process. He is experienced in espionage tactics and is able to discern unreliable and false information. He seems to empathize with the late Ostanian Colonel Erik Zacharis for his hidden starlet photo collection.
WISE Rookie
Voiced by: Kento Shiraishi
An inexperienced agent who works under the tutelage of Sylvia. He is easy to be swayed by false information and his own emotions, which sometimes leads to incorrect assessment of the situation.
WISE Director
Voiced by: Akio Ōtsuka
The director of WISE who is also in charge of Operation Strix. He resides in WISE Headquarter in Westalis and his face is obscured for the readers and audiences. He has a lackadaisical attitude toward Operation Strix, having great faith that Twilight is able to pull anything off.

== State Security Service ==
The State Security Service <SSS> (国家保安局, Kokka Hoankyoku), or the Secret Police (秘密警察, Himitsu Keisatsu) as the common people call them, is an Ostanian organization established to maintain public order. Their main objectives are counter-intelligence activities, including surveilling the public and hunting spies. They resort to any tactic no matter how extreme to get information, including kidnapping, interrogation, torture, wiretapping, etc.

Yuri Briar (ユーリ・ブライア, Yūri Buraia)
Voiced by: Kensho Ono, Mirei Kumagai (young) (Japanese); Dallas Reid, Sarah Wiedenheft (young) (English)
Played by: Kurumu Okamiya, Tsubasa Takizawa and Sion Yoshitaka (Japanese musical adaptation)
Yor's 20-year-old younger brother. Ostensibly an official at the Ministry of Foreign Affairs, this is cover for his actual position as a second lieutenant in the State Security Service—where he is tasked with hunting down "Twilight" and other rebels, terrorists, and overseas intelligence groups. He is exemplary at his job and knows how to use violence as a tool to get his work done, showing no mercy to criminals. However, he still has empathy and compassion for others. He is a bit too attached to his sister, opposing Yor and Loid's marriage and having an antagonistic view toward Loid and Anya, while knowing neither Yor's actual assassin job nor Loid's true identity. Both Loid and Anya know about his actual occupation as secret police while Yor remains oblivious. He has a sturdy physique, being able to withstand heavy injuries and consume poisonous food, thanks to his childhood under Yor's care. Despite his resilience, his tendency to overwork sometimes gets the best of him, leaving him bedridden quite a few times.
Chadwick Curtis (チャドウィック・カーティス, Chadowikku Kātisu)^{[ch. 134]}
Voiced by: Yasuyuki Kase
Yuri's higher-command colleague, a first lieutenant (Captain in the manga's English translations) in the SSS. He has two scars over his left eye that he received in battle during the last war.^{[ch. 134]} While he is a stoic and serious person, he seems to care for Yuri and views him like a close friend. He knows about Yuri's obsession with his sister, his overwork tendencies and his drinking problem and advises him accordingly. He also took care of Yuri by bringing him food and herbal medicine when he is sick.
Chloe (クロエ, Kuroe)
Yuri's colleague in the SSS, being in a lower rank than him. She has known Yuri since the university days, back when he attended the same university with her. She respects Yuri's talents and hard-working ethics but disapproves his recklessness and disregard of his own wellbeing, showing that she cares for him to some certain degree.^{[ch. 85, 89]}
Director Wilker (ウィルカー, Wirukā)
Voiced by: Jiro Saito (Japanese); Anthony DiMascio (English)
Yuri's boss. He is a cheerful man who is fond of Yuri, comparing him to a "cute puppy". Apparently thanks to him, Yuri was recruited into the SSS and subsequently rose quickly in the ranks. He is pictured wearing dark aviator-style sunglasses and long mutton-chop sideburns.
Winston Wheeler (ウィンストン・ウィーラー, Winsuton Wīrā)
Voiced by: Daisuke Ono^{Ep. 48 credits}
An Ostanian agent who was sent to WISE agency in Westalis as a mole. He is a highly professional and efficient spymaster with a cold and distrustful manner. During his time as a WISE agent, he slipped information to the East and was behind a recent spy purge. He also partnered with Twilight sometime in the past. Right before being discovered, he stole a lot of high-confidential documents, including the location of all active WISE agent in Ostania and escaped. Winston was stopped and captured by the Ostanian-side WISE agents in the town of Shellbury, being defeated in combat by Nightfall. He was taken off guard by Nightfall when she furiously and ruthlessly sacrificed both of her arms and one of her legs to pummel him, being provoked by Winston beforehand.

== Garden ==
Garden (ガーデン, Gāden) is the notorious Ostanian assassin organization which many people consider to be an urban legend. They operate under the direction from a shadow government to purge the traitors of the country. The group also has connections to the underground mafia, including the former Gretcher family. It is said that only one of their operatives is enough to wipe out an entire military squad.

Shopkeeper (店長, Tenchō)
Voiced by: Junichi Suwabe (Japanese); Jim Foronda (English)
The leader of Garden, the assassin group where Yor is currently employed. He has a long, thick and rugged lock of white hair, resembling a thick patch of grass. The Shopkeeper contacts and provides Yor with photos of the target, as well as information about their capabilities and defenses. He is always seen in his garden, pruning plants with a large pair of shears, which doubles as a weapon. Yor always reports and asks for the Shopkeeper's permission for every of her important and significant decisions, such as getting into a pretend marriage with Loid and befriending Melinda Desmond. He recently seemed to be concerned about Loid's interest in Donovan Desmond and Ostanian National Unity Party.
Matthew McMahon (マシュー・マクマホン, Mashū Makumahon)
Voiced by: Kenyū Horiuchi
Played by: Keigo Yoshino (Japanese musical adaptation)
One of Garden's affiliates who works as the Director of Policy at Berlint City Hall. He keeps an eye on Yor and supports her in her missions. Although he is apparently not as superhumanly strong as Yor, he is exceptionally competent, being able to dispatch weak assassins sent after them or handle multiple types of gun efficiently. He is aware of Yor's wavering determination and conflicted emotions during a given mission.
Hemlock
A vicious rival of Yor who cares very little about collateral damage during his missions. After challenging Yor to a fight and losing, he becomes her co-worker at Berlint City Hall in order to learn more about society.
Gympie
A short member of Garden who can effectively conceal herself.

== Desmond family ==
Donovan Desmond (ドノバン・デズモンド, Donoban Dezumondo)
Voiced by: Takaya Hashi (Japanese); John Burgmeier (English)
The President of the National Unity Party, former Prime Minister of Ostania and the primary target of Operation Strix. He is married to Melinda and the father of Demetrius and Damian. He rarely appears in the public and always stays in the shadow of his own operations. His only appearance is at an annual party held for the Eden Academy's Imperial Scholars, which his son Demetrius is a part of. He emphasizes achievement and emotionally neglects his children. As WISE reported, his political party, which supports the instigation of another war against Westalis, lost power and recently have resorted to smaller events and incidents prompting unrest among the citizens.
Melinda Desmond (メリンダ・デズモンド, Merinda Dezumondo)
Voiced by: Kikuko Inoue
Donovan's wife, the former First Lady of Ostania and Demetrius and Damian's mother. She meets Yor by chance and quickly befriends her, inviting Yor to her group of friends, "The Lady Patriot Society", consisting of mothers from affluent families who live in Berlint. Like her husband, she is distant and estranged from her family. Taking a "hand-off parenting" method, she limits communication with her sons. She also keeps her circle close and intimate and rarely involves herself in politics since her family's political party lost power. During their first encounter, Anya discovered that she has a kind of dissociative identity disorder, which manifests in her feelings toward her sons quickly alternating between motherly love and total disregard for their wellbeing.
Demetrius Desmond (ディミトリアス・デズモンド, Dimitoriasu Dezumondo)
Voiced by: Aoi Ichikawa
The first son of Donovan and Melinda Desmond. He attends Eden Academy and is a part of the Imperial Scholars group due to various academic achievements. He is said to be an exceptional student and an overachiever, as Loid noted that he only made a single mistake in his midterm exams. He rarely converses with his brother and seems to be distant to the rest of his family like their parents. Like his brother, he also lives in the school dormitory (albeit a different one from Cecil Hall dorm).
Damian Desmond (ダミアン・デズモンド, Damian Dezumondo)
The second son of Donovan and Melinda Desmond. He also attends Eden Academy and was put in Cecil Hall class.

== Supporting characters ==
Franky Franklin (フランキー・フランクリン, Furankī Furankurin)
Voiced by: Hiroyuki Yoshino (Japanese); Anthony Bowling (English)
Played by: Kento Kinouchi and Shogo Suzuki (Japanese musical adaptation)
An informant who provides information to Twilight and a longtime friend of the spy; he first met Twilight during the last war between Westalis and Ostania, as soldiers from opposite sides of the battlefield.^{[ch. 62]} He is aware of Twilight's mission, the Forger family's situation and frequently acts as a caretaker for Anya and Bond. He works as a tobacconist during the day and an inventor in his free time. He is notably hopeless in his romantic pursuits. Anya calls him Scruffy (モジャ, Moja; lit. unkempt, shaggy) and he seems to be fond of that name, sometimes using it as his alias in his informant jobs. Recently he has become an informant for Nightfall as well.
Camilla (カミラ, Kamira)
Voiced by: Umeka Shōji (Japanese); Morgan Lauré (English)
One of three co-workers of Yor at City Hall. Dominic's girlfriend. A two-faced woman at first, she slowly warms up to Yor over the course of the story, to the point of teaching her on how to cook. Camilla is an excellent cook as she is able to figure out the Briar soup recipe by simply hearing the story of how Yor made it.
Millie (ミリー, Mirī)
Voiced by: Manaka Iwami (Japanese); Katelyn Barr (English)
One of three co-workers of Yor at City Hall. A blunt girl, and the youngest of the three. She is primarily used as a running gag because of her desire to report her boss to the Secret Police, due to him ogling her. She broke up with her boyfriend sometime at the beginning of the story.
Sharon (シャロン, Sharon)
Voiced by: Mirei Kumagai (Japanese); Leah Clark (English)
One of three co-workers of Yor at City Hall. A snide woman at first, Sharon becomes supportive of Yor over the course of the story. The oldest of the three, she is married and has a child who is taking Eden Academy's entrance exam at the beginning of the story.
Dominic (ドミニック, Dominikku)
Voiced by: Shōhei Kajikawa (Japanese); Jordan Dash Cruz (English)
Camilla's beau and Yuri's co-worker at the Ministry of Foreign Affairs. He lives next door to Yuri and is unaware of Yuri's real job. He is very supportive of Yor through her endeavors, and also provides Yuri information about his sister occasionally.
Martha Marriott (マーサ・マリオット, Māsa Mariotto)
Voiced by: Shoko Tsuda (Japanese); Linda Leonard (English)
The butler of the Blackbell family and the primary caretaker of Becky Blackbell. She cares for and loves Becky genuinely, correcting her haughtiness and bad manners. She is usually seen as Becky's chauffeur. Loid observes that Martha might be an experienced veteran. Despite her age, Martha is able to execute difficult acrobatic movements and shoot a stun gun midair while rescuing Anya. She and Henry seem to know each other well; she was extremely worried for him when he willingly sacrificed himself to be a hostage.^{[ch. 72]} It is later revealed that she was his underclassman at Eden Academy, and harbored feelings for him, but was unable to tell him before war broke out and she enlisted in the Women's Defense Auxiliary. She fought on the front lines and barely survived, presumed dead by the public. She was saved by a western woman named Anabel who took care of her. By the time she made her way back to Ostania, Henry had married someone else, believing her to be dead. She had dreams of being a ballet dancer, but these were destroyed by the war.^{[Ch. 97–102]}
Sigmund Auten (ジークムント・オーセン, Jīkumunto Ōsen)
An elderly man who, with his wife Barbara, recently moved into the apartment building the Forgers live in, becoming their newest neighbors.^{[Ch. 90]} He went to Covenia to help soldiers in rehabilitation. He loves his wife very much. He taught neurology and other subjects at the Berlint University and according to Loid's intel about him, was regarded highly as a scholar. He helped Anya in getting the 2nd highest score in Classical Language in the 1st Term-Final exams.^{[Ch. 92–93]} Later it is revealed that he knows and has met Donovan and possibly knows something about a plan of his and Anya's past. ^{[Ch. 121–122]}
Barbara Auten (バーバラ・ボックル, Bābara Ōsen)
An elderly woman who, with her husband Sigmund, recently moved into the apartment building the Forgers live in, becoming their newest neighbors. She loves her husband very much.

== Other characters ==
Bondman (ボンドマーン, Bondomān)
Voiced by: Taisuke Nakano (Japanese); Aaron Campbell (English)
Bondman is a master spy and the main character of the in-universe fictional comic and cartoon series Spy Wars (スパイ大戦争, Supai Dai Sensō; lit. Spy Great War) that is Anya's favorite series. He is always seen with his trademarked yellow hat and coat, and black mask, gloves and shoes. Bond Forger was named after him for their similarities. He regularly fights against the League of Evil and rescues Princess Honey (ハニー姫, Hanī-hime). He is also a womanizer, having seduced a lot of women throughout his career, including his enemies, allies, and even bystanders. He refuses to give up any of his romance conquests, even while facing the anger, jealousy and violent treatment from his girlfriends. He is a parody of Ian Fleming's James Bond.
Keith Kepler (キース・ケプラー, Kīsu Kepurā)
Voiced by: Hiroki Takahashi (Japanese); Clifford Chapin (English)
Played by: Toru Isono (Japanese musical adaptation)
The leader of an extremist terrorist group, consisting of Berlint University students. He and his group planned to ignite the war between two countries by assassinating the visiting Westalian Minister Brantz with bomb-carrying dogs. He is shown to be cruel and heartless, ordering his underling to kill Anya when she discovered his plan and willingly sacrificing innocent lives in his bomb attack. He is also very intelligent, able to make an explosive trap that would have taken Loid Forger's life without Anya and Bond's intervention. He was intercepted by WISE agents and later arrested.
Daybreak (東雲, Shinonome)
Voiced by: Yuichi Nakamura (Japanese); David Matranga (English)
A self-employed Ostanian spy. He believes himself the rival of the renowned spy Twilight and names himself accordingly. He was hired by George Glooman to sabotage the Desmond brothers' exam sheets. He is vastly unprepared and careless, and consequently, unsuitable for espionage, although he seems to possess a great amount of luck.
Leonardo Hapoon (レオナルド・ハプーン, Reonarudo Hapūn)
The usurper of the Gretcher family's mafia organization. He eliminated all of the Gretchers, except Olka Gretcher and her son, and took power in their stead. He ordered assassins to chase after Olka when she planned her escape on the Princess Lorelei cruise. He is now conspiring with Ostanian pro-war extremists to get rich through arms dealing.
Olka Gretcher (オルカ・グレッチャー, Oruka Gurecchā) / Shaty Grey (シャティ・グレイ, Shati Gurei)
Voiced by: Aya Endō (Japanese); Mallorie Rodak (English)
Played by: Hitomi Arisa (Japanese musical adaptation)
The last surviving member of the Gretcher family, along with her son Gram Gretcher (グラム・グレッチャー, Guramu Gurecchā), after her family was wiped out by an insurgence led by Leonardo Hapoon. Her family used to run a black market and use the profit to feed the less fortunate during the war. After her family's annihilation, she changed her appearance and planned to escape to another country on the Princess Lorelei cruise ship with Gram and her friend Zeb (ゼブ, Zebu), pretending to be the couple Furseal and Shaty Grey (ファーシルとシャティ・グレイ, Fāshiru to Shati Gurei). Thanks to the Garden's help, they were put under the protection of Yor and Matthew and were able to escape safely after a bloody confrontation with the assassins sent by Hapoon. She is showed to be a kind-hearted woman who care for her family and friends.
Snoops (聞き耳くん, Kikimimi-kun)
Voiced by: Kazuyuki Okitsu
An assassin who is talented in surveillance, relying on his skill of listening to gather information. He can listen to multiple listening devices and filter the information he needs. He was hired to assassinate Olka and her son on the cruise ship Princess Lorelei. Thanks to his ability, he quickly tracked down her location early and alerted his allies. He is also very ruthless and cruel, readily committing to sink the whole ship along with all of the passengers and his allies when he realizes the ambush failed. After their life raft was inadvertently blown up by Loid, he and the assassin leader were last seen being surrounded by sharks.
Cruise Ship Assassin Leader
Voiced by: Kohsuke Toriumi
An assassin who was hired by Leonardo Hapoon to assassinate Olka and her son on the cruise ship Princess Lorelei. He has an extremely keen sense of smell and had used that ability to track down Olka's group and the hidden bombs. He is also very perceptive and calculated, preferring to send other assassins to fight in his stead and fleeing as soon as he realized the plan had failed. He follows his own moral code, to share the pay equally and to not involve innocent bystanders. After their life raft was inadvertently blown up by Loid, he and Snoops were last seen being surrounded by sharks.
Gerald Gorey (ジェラルド・ゴーリー, Jerarudo Gōrī)
The Medical Director of Berlint General Hospital, where Loid and Fiona are working. He has a crush on Fiona, and regularly stalks her despite her not-so-discreet rejection. Gerald was envious and jealous of Loid because of his rising popularity among the hospital's residents and his closeness to Fiona. Gerald attempted to sabotage Loid's medical works and professional image, and went as far as falsely reporting Loid to the SSS. Thanks to his clever counter-plan, Loid won Gerald's gratitude and Gerald has stopped acting against him and giving him troubles.
Billy Squire (ビリー・スクワイア, Birī Sukuwaia)
The former leader of the Red Circus, a student movement against war turning into terrorist group. He is the father of Bridget "Biddy" Squire (ブリジット（ビディ）・スクワイア, Burijitto (Bidi) Sukuwaia), a student member of the old Red Circus before she was killed by the SSS in a protest. After the Red Circus was nearly wiped out by the government and the Garden (under Yor's hands), he and a couple of remaining members ran away from the country. Later, they went back in and staged a kidnapping scheme of Eden Academy's students in an attempt to free his captured Red Circus members. The plan was thwarted by Anya and her friends, for Billy saw his late daughter's spirit in Anya, letting himself to be captured by the state.

== Reception ==
Antonio Mireles of The Fandom Post enjoyed the comedy of the title dysfunctional family as well as their personalities. He described the family setup of Loid as the straight man, Yor the "dumb character" and Anya the adorable child "that readers fall in love with", as the perfect recipe for a comedy. However, he felt the humor that comes from Yor being the dumb character was underutilized. As a result, Anime News Network felt that following chapters focused on Yor made her character more enjoyable. Comic Book Resources called the artist's range of facial expressions his "secret weapon" to attract readers, most notably Anya, whom Collins said, "steals every page she appears on". In a review for Polygon, Julia Lee agreed, focusing on the expressive panels that really show the audience the characters are feeling. In a further analysis, Den of Geek finds the Forgers' secrets as another reason for the series' popularity while also highlighting how despite Loid being a competent spy, his mission of becoming a good father is also hilarious.

Anime Feminist also noted that the series' popularity is owed to the artwork, most notably Anya's multiple facial expressions and felt that the first episode was appealing thanks to the bond Loid and Anya form when the former adopts the latter, giving potential for Yor's debut. Morgana Santilli of The Beat enjoyed the chemistry between the arranged family as he notes Anya makes the trio stand out. IGN also enjoyed Anya to the point she could be one of the best characters from 2022, labelling her as the "adorable child character that steals every scene they are in, who will inspire a ludicrous amount of merch" while also addressing how her powers are also a symbolism of how receptive children can be. IGN also praised Yor due to how strong she can be despite early signs of a clumsy woman.

Anya's popularity led to Toho make a music video heavily featuring her. Additionally, a Tamagotchi involving Anya was released in June 2022. In a survey conducted by FinT, Spy × Family and Anya were ranked first and fourth respectively, on the top trending things among Generation Z in Japan for 2022. In the same survey, "Anya likes peanuts" (アーニャピーナッツが好き) was the no. 1 trending phrase of the year in part due to music remixes on TikTok.
