= Blade of the Moon Princess =

Japanese manga series

- Cover of the first volume

月華美刃 (Gekka Bijin)
- Genre: Adventure; Coming of age; Science fiction
- Manga
- Written by: Tatsuya Endo
- Published by: Shueisha
- English publisher: NA: Viz Media
- Magazine: Jump Square
- Original run: May 1, 2010 – January 1, 2012
- Volumes: 5

Blade of the Moon Princess (Japanese: 月華美刃, Hepburn: Gekka Bijin) is a Japanese manga series written and illustrated by Tatsuya Endo. The series is loosely based on the Japanese fairytale The Tale of the Bamboo Cutter. It was serialized in Shueisha's Jump Square magazine from May 2010 to January 2012 and published in five volumes.

== Publication ==
Written and illustrated by Tatsuya Endo, the series originated as a one-shot published in Weekly Shōnen Jump in 2000, before beginning serialization in Shueisha's Jump Square magazine on May 1, 2010. The series completed its serialization on January 4, 2012. The series individual chapters have been collected into five tankōbon volumes.

In February 2023, Viz Media announced that they licensed the series for English publication.

=== Volumes ===
No.	Original release date	Original ISBN	English release date	English ISBN
1	September 3, 2010	978-4-08-870130-1	September 5, 2023	978-1-9747-3865-6
2	February 4, 2011	978-4-08-870183-7	December 5, 2023	978-1-9747-4094-9
3	July 4, 2011	978-4-08-870243-8	March 5, 2024	978-1-9747-4315-5
4	November 4, 2011	978-4-08-870340-4	June 4, 2024	978-1-9747-4577-7
5	March 2, 2012	978-4-08-870380-0	October 1, 2024	978-1-9747-4870-9

== Reception ==
Erkael of Manga News praised the setting, characters, and artwork, while criticizing the narration. Nicolas Demay of Planete BD also praised the artwork and characters; Demay also praised the story.
