= Nonoka Murakata =

Japanese singer

- Also known as: Nono-chan
- Born: May 31, 2018 (age 8)
- Origin: Bunkyō-ku, Tokyo, Japan
- Genres: Nursery rhyme
- Occupations: Singer
- Years active: 2020-present
- Label: King Records

Nonoka Murakata (Japanese: 村方乃々佳, Hepburn: Murakata Nonoka; born May 31, 2018), also popularly known as Nono-chan is a Japanese child actress and singer.

== Career ==
Murakata was born on May 31, 2018. She is from Bunkyō-ku, Tokyo. Her mother was a nursery teacher before marrying. Her mother taught her how to sing. In October 2020, she took part in Japan's 35th Nursery Rhyme Children's Song Contest and won a silver medal in the children's category. She also became the youngest winner for her performance of the song "Dog Policeman" (いぬのおまわりさん). On December 26, 2020, her song performance on the show was uploaded to YouTube which went viral both in Japan and South Korea, and by February 2021, the video received over 13.85 million views. On January 4, 2021, she launched her own YouTube channel called "Nono-Channel (ののちゃんねる) and by February 2021, the channel surpassed 300 thousand subscribers. In South Korea, Jaejoong of the K-Pop group JYJ and Taeyeon of the girl group Girls' Generation have publicly declared themselves fans on social media.

Murakata debuted on Kings Record on March 26, 2021, with her mini-album Nono-chan 2-sai Kodomo Uta. In November 2022, she was certified by Guinness World Records as the "Youngest solo artist to release an album" at the age of 2 years and 361 days old. She was later featured in the Guinness World Records 2023. On her fifth birthday in 2023, she release her first original songs "Doremi no Kaidan", "Hanbun Gokko", "Koishite Keredo", all written by Toyohisa Araki and composed by Koji Makaino. In 2023, she was cast as Creme in the 2023 anime film Sylvanian Families: The Movie.

Murakata made her musical theatre debut playing Anya Forger in the musical adaptation of Spy × Family in 2025. In March 2026, she passed and received her Kanji Proficiency Test Level 9 certificate.

== Discography ==
=== Album ===
| Album | Release date | Peak Ranking | | |
| Album | Release date | JP Albums | JP Hot | JP Download |
|---|---|---|---|---|
| Nono-chan 2-sai no Kodomo Uta | May 26, 2021 | 20 | 22 | 57 |
| Nono-chan 3-sai no Kodomo Uta | January 12, 2022 | — | 35 | — |
| Nono-chan Kodomo Uta ~Mikan no Hana Sakuoka~ | August 3, 2022 | — | — | — |
| Smile ~Minna Egao ni Nāre~ | April 24, 2024 | — | — | — |
| Nono-chan Ichinen-sei ni Nattara ~Sotsuen Omedetō Special~ | February 19, 2025 | — | — | — |

== Filmography ==
- 2023 - Sylvanian Families: The Movie, Creme (voice)
- 2025 - Spy × Family (musical), Anya Forger
