= (K)now Name =

Japanese music group

(K)now_Name
- Origin: Japan
- Genres: J-pop; rock; anime song
- Years active: 2016–present
- Label: Toho Animation Records
- Website: knowname.jp

(K)now_Name (stylized as (K)NoW_NAME) is a Japanese music group affiliated with Toho Animation Records. Formed in 2016, the group primarily provides music for anime series.

== History ==
The project was conceived by anime producer Masaya Saitou, who wanted a music group that could create music in various genres for any anime. Collaborating with Mikami Masataka, who was a music producer at Toho Animation Records at the time, musicians, Makoto Miyazaki, R.O.N, Shuhei Mutsuki, Kohei by Simonsayz, Genki Mizuno, and eNu, all of whom are affiliated with music production company Verygoo, joined the project. They later held an audition to find vocalists for the project. Three vocalists, Ayaka Tachibana, Nikiie, and Aij, were chosen, forming the group (K)NoW_NAME in January 2016. The group first work was the soundtrack for the 2016 anime television series Grimgar of Fantasy and Ash, including the opening and ending themes.

Saitou originally wanted to name the group NO_NAME, but there was already another group with the same name. Still wanted something similar to match the concept that he had, he changed the spelling to (K)NoW_NAME, in which "Know" means "Knows only the name", "Now" referring to the project that they could be working on at any time, and added the notation "(K)" to the word "No" form the original name to became "(K)NoW_NAME", indicating that there are three hidden names. Instead of using the members' real portraits, Saitou wanted to use original illustrations of the members to convey the creativity of the group. Illustrations for the group are handled by South Korean artist So-bin.

== Members ==
Vocalists

- Ayaka Tachibana
- Nikiie
- Aij

Composers

- R.O.N
- Makoto Miyazaki
- Shuhei Mutsuki
- Hiromitsu Kawashima
- Kohei by Simonsayz
- eNu
- Genki Mizuno

Illustrator

- So-bin

== Works ==
Year	Title	Note(s)	Ref(s)
2016	Grimgar of Fantasy and Ash	also produced opening, ending themes, and insert songs; music composed by R.O.N	
2017	Sakura Quest	also produced opening, ending themes, and insert songs; music composed by Makoto Miyazaki	
2018	Quiz RPG: The World of Mystic Wiz	video game; theme song "New Order"	
2019	Fairy Gone	also produced opening and ending themes; music composed by Shuhei Mutsuki and Makoto Miyazaki	
2020	Dorohedoro	also produced opening and ending themes; music composed by R.O.N	
2022	Spy × Family	also produced insert songs; music composed by Shuhei Mutsuki and Makoto Miyazaki	
2023	Spy x Family Code: White	also produced insert songs; music composed by Shuhei Mutsuki	
2026	Dorohedoro	also produced opening and ending themes; music composed by R.O.N	
