= Tista (manga) =

Japanese manga series

- Cover of the first volume
- Genre: Action-thriller
- Manga
- Written by: Tatsuya Endo
- Published by: Shueisha
- English publisher: NA: Viz Media
- Magazine: Jump Square
- Original run: November 2, 2007 – July 4, 2008
- Volumes: 2
- icon

Tista (stylized in all caps) is a Japanese manga series written and illustrated by Tatsuya Endo. It was serialized in Jump Square from November 2007 to July 2008 and published in two volumes.

== Plot ==
The series follows a young girl named Tista Rockwell and her work as an assassin for a religious extremist group. After she meets a man named Arty, she begins to see the hypocrisy of her organization and attempts to leave.

== Publication ==
Written and illustrated by Tatsuya Endo, the series began serialization in Jump Square on November 2, 2007. (Note: It began in the December 2007 issue, released on November 2.) The series completed its serialization on July 4, 2008. (Note: It finished in the August 2008 issue, released on July 4.) The series' individual chapters were collected into two tankōbon volumes.

In June 2022, Viz Media announced that they licensed the series for English publication.

=== Volume list ===
No.	Original release date	Original ISBN	English release date	English ISBN
1	June 4, 2008	978-4-08-874490-2	April 4, 2023	978-1-9747-3671-3
2	September 4, 2008	978-4-08-874570-1	July 4, 2023	978-1-9747-3751-2

== Reception ==
Shaedhen from Manga News offered praise for the artwork and characters, though they also felt the story was unoriginal. The columnist for Manga Sanctuary also offered praise for the artwork, while noting that the story was nothing original but still enjoyable. Faustine Lillaz from Planete BD was more critical, describing the characters as "stereotypes on legs". Despite this, she offered praise for the artwork.
