= Tatsuya Endo =

Japanese manga artist (born 1980)

- Born: July 23, 1980 (age 46); Ibaraki Prefecture, Japan
- Education: Ibaraki Kenritsu Koga Daisan High School
- Occupation: Manga artist
- Writing career
- Years active: 2000–present
- Notable work: Spy × Family

Tatsuya Endo (Japanese: 遠藤 達哉, Hepburn: Endō Tatsuya; born July 23, 1980) is a Japanese manga artist. Endo is best known for creating Tista, Blade of the Moon Princess, and Spy × Family manga series among other works. The latter work has been serialized on the Shōnen Jump+ platform since 2019 and had over 35 million copies in circulation as of March 2024, making it one of the best-selling manga series of all time. All the while his other works have been published in various Jump magazines.

== Early life ==
Ever since childhood, Endo aspired to become a manga artist. His family consisted of one parent and a brother. His favorite actors and actresses are Bruce Lee, Hiroshi Abe, Meg Ryan, and Audrey Tautou. His favourite manga artists are Akira Toriyama, Hiroyuki Nishimori, and Minetarō Mochizuki. His hobbies include skiing, basketball, and racket-based ball games.

== Interests ==
In his free time, he gets his inspiration from various TV series. In his interview, he mentioned the information that he was inspired by the series "Under the Dome" and "Çukur". He also gave some information about his favorite actors, Aras Bulut Iynemli and Alexander Koch.

== Career ==
Endo worked as an assistant for the manga series Blue Exorcist, Fire Punch, Attack on Titan and Kono Oto Tomare. He was mentored by manga artists Yasuhiro Kanō and Yoshiyuki Nishi. Like many manga artists, Endo began his career creating one-shots. Some of these one off stories would have influences towards his later manga. After finishing Tista and Blade of the Moon Princess for Jump Square and finishing three one-shots with editor Shihei Lin, who Endo had known and worked with for more than 10 years, the two began to plan for a series that would feature in Shōnen Jump+. This manga would combine what Lin thought were the strengths of Endo's previous works; Rengoku no Ashe, Ishi ni Usubeni, Tetsu ni Hoshi and I Spy, creating Spy × Family. Lin claimed that the reception for Spy × Family from their editorial department was so good that its serialization was "practically decided" before an official meeting for it took place. Spy × Family would go on to become part of the top ten most popular manga on their website as of 2019. It became one of the most popular anime of 2022.

=== Awards ===
- Spy × Family
  - 2019: 1st in the web manga category of the Next Manga Awards.
  - 2020: Winner of the 4th TSUTAYA Comic Awards

== Style ==
At the beginning of his career, Endo published mature stories. This is especially true for his early titles Tista and Rengoku no Ashe, which are about a serial killer and witch hunting respectively. After working on so much manga with dark tones, his editor, Shihei Lin, encouraged Endo to come up with a more "bright and cheerful manga". The one-shot, I Spy, could be seen as a transition piece between Endo's dark and bright narratives, as it incorporates the mature themes of his early work while still being a "cheerful title" like Lin had suggested. His work in Spy × Family is the first that completely deviates into what is more considered a cheerful manga.

His editor claims that Endo likes to think through every detail of a plot. When proposed with an idea about his story, Endo will quickly point out any contradictions. This along with his need to create deep and well thought-out characters has pushed him into telling stories that show a positive or negative shift in the psychological state of his characters. Endo always seeks to improve the quality of his work, so he reads lots of manga, novels, and books.

== Works ==
=== Manga ===
Name	Format	Year	Serialization	Notes
Western Game (西部遊戯, Seibu Yūgi)	One-shot	2000	Jump Next!	
Blade of the Moon Princess (月華美刃, Gekka Bijin)	One-shot	2000	Weekly Shōnen Jump	Issue #51
Witch Craze	One-shot	2001	Weekly Shōnen Jump	Issue #21–22
PMG-0	One-shot	2004	Weekly Shōnen Jump	Issue #24
Tista	Serial	2007–2008	Jump SQ.	
Four Lives Remain: Tatsuya Endo Before Spy × Family (四方遊戯 遠藤達哉短編集, Shihō Yūgi: Endō Tatsuya Tanpenshū)	Volume	2008	Shueisha	Compilation of Western Game, Blade of the Moon Princess (one-shot), Witch Craze, and PMG-0
Blade of the Moon Princess (月華美刃, Gekka Bijin)	Serial	2010–2012	Jump SQ.	
Rengoku no Ashe (煉獄のアーシェ)	One-shot	2014	Jump SQ.	
Ishi ni Usubeni, Tetsu ni Hoshi (石に薄紅、鉄に星)	One-shot	2017	Jump SQ.	
I Spy	One-shot	2018	Jump SQ.	
Spy × Family	Serial	2019	Shōnen Jump+	Distributed outside Japan via Manga Plus

=== As illustrator ===
Name	Format	Year	Author	Serialization
Rooftop Detective-Octane (屋上探偵(オクタン))	One-shot	2006	Tomohito Ohsaki (大崎 知仁)	Jump the Revolution!
Yamamoto-kun's Distress (山本くんの怪難 北陸魔境勤労記)	Book	2011	Hinako Suzumeno (雀野 日名子)	Media Factory
Kuroniko the Exile (流浪刑のクロニコ)	Book	2013	Takahiro Kanno (菅野 隆宏)	Shueisha
