= List of Frieren episodes =

Japanese cover art for the first home media volume as released by Toho Animation, featuring Frieren

Frieren: Beyond Journey's End is an anime television series based on the manga series Frieren: Beyond Journey's End by Kanehito Yamada and Tsukasa Abe. It is produced by Madhouse and directed by Keiichirō Saitō, with script supervision by Tomohiro Suzuki, character designs by Reiko Nagasawa, and music composed by Evan Call.

The story follows elven mage Frieren, a former member of the party of adventurers who defeated the Demon King and restored harmony to the world after a ten-year quest. As years pass, Frieren stays the same due to her longer lifespan while the others age. After the hero Himmel's death, Frieren regrets keeping her former companions at arm's length and not getting to know them better during their adventure. After learning of the resting place of souls in the northernmost part of the continent, Frieren embarks on a long journey to give Himmel's soul a proper farewell. In the process, Frieren and a new group of traveling companions retrace the path to the Demon King's castle taken by Frieren's original party, bringing back old memories.

The two consecutive-cours series premiered with a two-hour special on September 29, 2023, on Nippon TV's programming block Kin'yō Road Show, which is normally reserved for feature films, becoming the first anime series to do so. Later episodes debuted on the new block Friday Anime Night on the same network and its NNS affiliates, and ended on March 22, 2024. For the four-episode premiere broadcast, the special ending theme is "Bliss", which was performed by Milet. The first opening theme is "Yūsha" (勇者; lit. 'Hero') by Yoasobi, while the ending theme is "Anytime Anywhere" by Milet. The second opening theme is "Sunny" (晴る, Haru) by Yorushika, and the second ending theme includes a different part of "Anytime Anywhere". Toho Animation compiled the episodes into seven Blu-ray and DVD sets, which were released from January 24 to July 17, 2024. Eleven short episodes, titled Frieren: Beyond Journey's End – Spell That Does OOO (Note: Official English title, per Crunchyroll's home media release) (葬送のフリーレン ～●●(まるまる)の魔法～, Sōsō no Frieren: Marumaru no Mahō), was released on Toho Animation's YouTube channel and on Frieren's official anime X and TikTok accounts from October 11, 2023, to March 24, 2024.

Crunchyroll licensed the series for streaming outside East Asia, and an English dub directed by Jad Saxton premiered on its streaming platform on October 13, 2023. The company released the series on Blu-ray and DVD sets; the first part, which includes the first 16 episodes, was released on December 17, 2024, while the second part was released on September 23, 2025. Muse Communication licensed the series in Southeast Asia.

In September 2024, it was announced the series was renewed for a second season. It aired from January 16 to March 27, 2026. The staff and cast from the first season are reprising their roles, with Tomoya Kitagawa replacing Keiichirō Saitō as the season's director. Daiki Harashina serves as the assistant director, while Takasemaru, Keisuke Kojima, and Yuri Fujinaka replacing Nagasawa as character designers. The opening theme is "lulu." by Mrs. Green Apple, while the ending theme is "The Story of Us" by Milet.

A third season, covering the "Golden Land" arc, was announced immediately after the conclusion of the second season. It is set to premiere in October 2027.

== Series overview ==
Season	Episodes	Originally released	
Season	Episodes	First released	Last released
1	28	September 29, 2023	March 22, 2024
2	10	January 16, 2026	March 27, 2026
3	TBA	October 2027	TBA

== Episodes ==
=== Season 1 (2023–2024) ===
No. overall	No. in season	Title	Directed by	Storyboarded by	Animation directed by	Original release date	Viewership rating
1	1	"The Journey's End"; Transliteration: "Bōken no Owari" (Japanese: 冒険の終わり)	Ayaka Tsuji	Keiichirō Saitō	Reiko Nagasawa	September 29, 2023	6.8% (Note: The episode rating counts as part of a 2-hour special premiere for the first four episodes.)
After defeating the Demon Lord, Himmel the Hero, priest Heiter, dwarf warrior Eisen, and elf mage Frieren return to the royal capital. After their procession, they view a meteor shower. Himmel, Heiter, and Eisen are ready to retire from adventuring after their ten-year quest. Frieren, whose lifespan is much longer, considers the ten years to be trivially short and plans to travel and learn new spells. To her colleagues' amusement, she promises to show them a better site to observe the meteor shower at its next occurrence in fifty years. Returning fifty years later, Frieren finds that Himmel and Heiter have become elderly, and Eisen is middle-aged. The week-long journey to Frieren's viewing site reminds the party of their past adventures. Himmel dies of old age shortly after the expedition. At his funeral, Frieren tearfully realizes she did not adequately get to know him and decides to learn as much about humans as possible. Twenty years later, she visits Heiter to find that he has adopted a war orphan, nine year old Fern. The elderly Heiter, suffering from death anxiety, asks Frieren to research life-extending magic and tutor Fern in magic. She agrees after seeing Fern's skill at magic.
2	2	"It Didn't Have to Be Magic…"; Transliteration: "Betsuni Mahō Janakutatte…" (Japanese: 別に魔法じゃなくたって…)	Tomoya Kitagawa	Tomoya Kitagawa	Ayaka Minoshima	September 29, 2023	6.8%
Frieren spends four years tutoring Fern while translating an ancient grimoire on immortality. Heiter collapses and can no longer walk. Fern declines to immediately see him, explaining that she must train continuously to become a mage before Heiter dies and show him this progress to thank him for intervening in her planned suicide and adopting her. Frieren expedites her translation; the grimoire reveals nothing about life extension. Heiter admits that he knew of this possibility, but wanted to ensure Frieren would stay to tutor Fern. Fern finally masters an offensive spell, and Heiter dies. She joins Frieren in her travels to continue to learn. They use magic to complete mundane tasks for townspeople, typically in return for documents about magic. During a cleaning of a statue of Himmel in a distant town, Frieren decides to decorate it with his favorite flower. The flower seems to have gone extinct in the region, and they spend six months searching for one. While reflecting about her motivation and friendship with Himmel, Frieren finds the flower in a rodent's seed hoard. She uses magic to conjure a field of the flowers for Himmel's statue.
3	3	"Killing Magic"; Transliteration: "Hito o Korosu Mahō" (Japanese: 人を殺す魔法)	Daiki Harashina	Daiki Harashina	Daiki Harashina	September 29, 2023	6.8%
Fern notices Frieren acting suspiciously. Frieren later admits that despite her efforts, she has learned almost nothing about Fern and was trying to think of a gift for Fern's birthday. Frieren decides to revisit places she visited with Himmel, Heiter and Eisen. The first place is a village where Frieren sealed away Qual, the Demon of Corruption. The seal will break soon so Frieren must defeat Qual. She learns Himmel checked the seal every year until he died, and was always confident that Frieren would visit before it broke. Frieren reveals that Qual invented a killing spell ("Zoltraak") that bypassed all barriers and armour to strike the body directly, which was so powerful at the time she could only seal rather than destroy him. Qual is unsealed, but Frieren reveals that in the eighty years he has been asleep, human mages learned and reverse engineered his spell, allowing them to develop new defense spells to block it. Unable to harm them, Qual is easily killed when Frieren uses his own spell on him. Frieren realizes the village elder is a boy she met at the village eighty years before.
4	4	"The Land Where Souls Rest"; Transliteration: "Tamashii no Nemuru Chi" (Japanese: 魂の眠る地)	Kento Matsui	Yoshiaki Kawajiri	Ayaka Tsuji	September 29, 2023	6.8%
In exchange for cleaning a beach, Frieren receives a fake grimoire supposedly written by famous mage Flamme. The work is finished by New Year when the locals traditionally watch the sunrise. Frieren, a notorious late sleeper, missed the sunrise during her last visit, upsetting her friends. This time she makes it but finds the sunrise dull, until she sees Fern enjoying herself and realizes why missing it last time upset everyone, because they were supposed to go together. They then visit Eisen's home, having not seen him in thirty years. He asks for help searching Voll Basin for Flamme's genuine grimoire as Flamme supposedly found a way to speak to the dead, and he thinks it will be beneficial for Frieren to speak with Himmel one more time. Flamme was Frieren's human master 1,000 years before. Frieren recovers Flamme's genuine grimoire which describes where all souls go, Aureole, at the northernmost point of the continent where the Demon Lord's castle is located. Frieren asks Eisen to accompany them to Aureole, but Eisen declines, citing he would slow her down in his old age. However, Eisen also reminds them that their original adventure to the Demon King's castle took ten years.
5	5	"Phantoms of the Dead"; Transliteration: "Shisha no Gen'ei" (Japanese: 死者の幻影)	Kōta Mori	Kenichi Shimizu	Reiko Nagasawa, Daiki Harashina, Emi Yamazaki & Izumi Seguchi	October 6, 2023	4.0%
Frieren acknowledges ten years is potentially a tenth of Fern's lifespan but Fern decides to follow her. En route, they enter a village where people disappeared after seeing ghosts of their deceased relatives. Frieren suspects an Einsam, a monster that lures victims with illusion magic. Fern is almost caught by Heiter's ghost but Frieren easily shoots Himmel's ghost, exposing the Einsam so Fern can destroy it. Continuing on the journey Frieren decides to kill a dragon to collect a grimoire from its nest. This requires a strong warrior so they seek out Stark, one of Eisen's students who once defeated the dragon in a staring contest and now lives nearby. Stark admits he has never killed a monster before and only won the famous contest because he was frozen with fear. Frieren gives him until morning to decide to help.
6	6	"The Hero of the Village"; Transliteration: "Mura no Eiyū" (Japanese: 村の英雄)	Tōru Iwazawa	Tōru Iwazawa	Keisuke Hiroe & Takasemaru	October 13, 2023	3.2%
Stark remains too afraid to face the dragon. Fern encourages Stark by telling him all he needs is resolve. The next day, Stark reluctantly agrees to distract the dragon despite still being scared. However, Frieren points out that Eisen was always scared as well before a major battle. Stark then engages the dragon and kills it without needing any assistance from Frieren and Fern. Frieren collects the grimoire and Stark agrees to accompany her on her journey. The trio head north to the city of Waal, but discover the checkpoint is closed due to increased monster activity in the northern lands. Frieren is content to stay in the city to continue her magic research, but Fern and Stark grow concerned after learning it may take up two years before the checkpoint can be reopened. Stark reveals to Fern that he wants to go on an adventure so that he can return to Eisen to regale him with his stories. The city's castellan eventually recognizes Frieren and believing that she has headed north to pacify the monsters, opens the checkpoint for her. Frieren and her party are given a heroes' sendoff, which embarrasses Frieren.
7	7	"Like a Fairy Tale"; Transliteration: "Otogibanashi no Yō na Mono" (Japanese: おとぎ話のようなもの)	Keisuke Kojima	Naoto Uchida & Keisuke Kojima	Norito Saitama & Ryōko Ino	October 20, 2023	3.0%
While traveling north with her party, Frieren explains the Elven race has been declining due to their lack of romantic feelings and reproductive instincts, and that they have scattered across the world. They pass by another village with statues of her and her original party who celebrate "Liberation Day". Frieren recalls a memory where Himmel was adamant the party leave behind statues of themselves as reminders to Frieren that they actually existed and are not simply fairy tales. Heading to another city, Frieren spots demons and tries to attack them, only to be arrested by the city guards for threatening peace envoys. It turns out that one of the Demon Lord's lieutenants, Aura the Guillotine, has recently regained her power and has been waging war against the city for twenty-eight years, leading both sides to open peace talks. However, Frieren knows from experience that demons are incapable of being reasoned with. Just as Frieren predicted, the demon peace envoy led by Lügner are simply there to trick the city into lowering its barrier so Aura can raze it with her army. One of his attendants, Draht, heads to the dungeon to assassinate Frieren.
8	8	"Frieren the Slayer"; Transliteration: "Sōsō no Furīren" (Japanese: 葬送のフリーレン)	Tomoya Kitagawa	Tomoya Kitagawa	Ayaka Sato, Reiko Nagasawa, Hiroyuki Kobashi & Emi Yamazaki	October 27, 2023	4.4%
Draht ignores Frieren's warning and attacks her, but she easily kills him and escapes the dungeon. The city's Graf, Granat, becomes suspicious about Draht's disappearance and Frieren's escape and confronts Lügner. With his plot exposed, Lügner captures Granat with the intention of forcing him to disable the city's barrier. Meanwhile, Fern and Stark agree to warn Granat about Lügner when they come across Frieren. Frieren refuses to help them against Lügner, confident that the two are strong enough to defeat him. Instead, Frieren leaves to confront Aura, who is waiting outside the city with her army. That night, Fern and Stark sneak into the keep and work together to seriously wound Lügner. With Granat badly injured, the two adventurers decide to rescue him and withdraw. As he heals his wound, Lügner finally realizes that Frieren is in the city. He recalls how Frieren is also nicknamed "Frieren the Slayer" due to killing more demons than anybody else in history. Outside the city, Frieren confronts Aura face to face.
9	9	"Aura the Guillotine"; Transliteration: "Dantōdai no Aura" (Japanese: 断頭台のアウラ)	Kōki Fujimoto	Kōki Fujimoto	Keita Nagasaka	November 3, 2023	3.4%
Fern and Stark manage to get Granat to safety in the town church, where he warns that Aura's trump card is a magic artifact called the Scales of Obedience, which measure the amount of mana she and opponent possesses. The one with the greater amount of mana can then dominate the loser, which is how she has created an army of puppets. Frieren destroys some of Aura's puppets, and seeing that she still has no understanding of humanity, concludes that she can kill her like a monster. Back in the city, Lügner and his assistant Linie ambush Fern and Stark. While the demons initially have the upper hand, Stark learns that Linie copied Eisen's fighting style from observing him in a battle, but lacks the strength to execute his moves with killing force, and uses that to his advantage to purposely take a blow from her axe so he can land a killing blow on her. Fern seizes the initiative by taking advantage of her main strength of being able to cast her spells more quickly than even Frieren, eventually overwhelming Lügner's defenses and killing him.
10	10	"A Powerful Mage"; Transliteration: "Tsuyoi Mahōtsukai" (Japanese: 強い魔法使い)	Nobuhide Kariya & Kazumasa Isogawa	Nobuhide Kariya	Ayaka Tsuji, Keita Nagasaka & Kunihiko Hamada	November 10, 2023	3.3%
Mortally wounded, Lügner realizes that Fern had been suppressing her mana to look weaker than she actually is, which is considered a taboo among demon mages. Fern then finishes off Lügner. A thousand years before, Flamme comes across a destroyed elf village and finds Frieren, the only survivor, having killed the demon general attacking her. Flamme decides to take Frieren on as her apprentice and teaches her how to suppress her mana and fight demons. Since demons are proud and self confident in their own magic and are incapable of suppressing their own mana, Flamme explains that by suppressing their mana, they can trick demons into feeling a false sense of security where they can be destroyed in a surprise attack. Flamme's last instruction to Frieren is to live in obscurity until she is powerful enough to defeat the Demon King. A thousand years later, Himmel and his party track down Frieren and attempt to recruit her. Seeing that Himmel can instinctively sense her true power, Frieren decides to join them. In the present, Aura uses the Scales of Obedience. Frieren shows the true extent of her mana and dominates Aura, who is forced to behead herself under Frieren's order.
11	11	"Winter in the Northern Lands"; Transliteration: "Kitagawa Shokoku no Fuyu" (Japanese: 北側諸国の冬)	Kento Matsui & Kunio Fujii	Keiichirō Saitō	Shinichi Yoshikawa	November 17, 2023	3.9%
After paying proper respects to Aura's victims and enjoying Granat's hospitality, Frieren and her party continues on their journey, but plans to drop by at Äußerst, a large magical city in the northern lands, to get a first-class mage certification that will enable them to travel through the Northern Plateau. However, on the way, they get lost in a blizzard at the foot of the Schwer mountains and Stark begins to suffer hypothermia. They eventually find an emergency cabin and meet an elven monk named Kraft. Frieren and her party stay with Kraft inside the cabin for six months to ride out the winter. Kraft then confides in Frieren that he decided to worship the Goddess because with all of his old friends dead and his accomplishments long forgotten, only she can remember his deeds and praise him when he finally goes to heaven. He then asks about Frieren's past, offering to praise her in the place of the Goddess. This triggers a flashback where Heiter once said the exact same words to Frieren and she declines Kraft's offer, stating somebody has already praised her. Kraft advises that Frieren cherish her friends and companions before parting ways with her and her party.
12	12	"A Real Hero"; Transliteration: "Honmono no Yūsha" (Japanese: 本物の勇者)	Yoshiki Kawasaki	Yoshiki Kawasaki	Daiki Harashina, Takasemaru, Keita Nagasaka & Reiko Nagasawa	November 24, 2023	4.0%
En route to Äußerst, Frieren and her party stop by the Village of the Sword, the resting place of the legendary Hero's Sword, so that Frieren can fulfill her obligation to regularly clear out the monsters attracted by the Sword. Stark sees the Hero's Sword still embedded in a stone, and is confused because he was told stories that Himmel pulled the Sword from the stone. Frieren remarks that Himmel failed at pulling the sword but stories claimed otherwise after the fact. She then recalls how Himmel was not discouraged at all, simply saying that he will prove himself a hero by defeating the Demon Lord without it. The party then heads to the next town, where Fern learns it is Stark's eighteenth birthday so she asks him what gift he would like. Stark reveals that he is not used to getting presents because his warrior family never celebrated them, believing he was a failure to for being a coward, especially when he ran away when a monster attacked their village. Fern reassures him that she and Frieren will make sure he will not run away, and helps him buy a silver bracelet. Upon returning to the inn, Frieren has prepared hamburg steaks, which Eisen had always traditionally done on birthdays. Frieren reveals to Stark that, among Warrior cultures, a hamburg steak is given to those acknowledged as trying their hardest. This triggers a memory of his older brother Stoltz secretly cooking him hamburg steak on his birthday, as well as being the person telling Stark to flee the village so that he can live. Stark then feels some closure realizing that his brother loved him.
13	13	"Aversion to One's Own Kind"; Transliteration: "Dōzoku Ken'o" (Japanese: 同族嫌悪)	Takahiro Natori	Yoshiaki Kawajiri	Yi Jun Lin & Shizuku Ishii	December 1, 2023	3.7%
Frieren rescues Sein, a local priest, from a swamp, and Sein returns the favor by curing Stark after he is bit by a venomous snake. Sein's brother reveals that Sein has a natural talent for healing spells, and asks Frieren to push Sein into becoming an adventurer, a dream that he had held as a child but eventually lost his passion for, culminating in him turning down an invitation from his best friend ten years ago. Frieren gains an interest in Sein because his apathy reminds her of the apathy she felt before Himmel recruited her. Wanting to save Sein from his own apathy, Frieren takes it upon herself to convince Sein to become an adventurer. Sein finally admits that the reason he did not leave the village was because he knew his brother turned down an opportunity to move to the Holy City so as not to separate Sein from his hometown. However, Sein's brother slaps him and points out that he never regretted his decisions but Sein clearly does. This finally convinces Sein to join Frieren's party until he can find the whereabouts of his friend.
14	14	"Privilege of the Young"; Transliteration: "Wakamono no Tokken" (Japanese: 若者の特権)	Shinya Iino	Shinya Iino	Hirotoshi Arai & Rikka	December 8, 2023	3.7%
After reaching the next town, Fern and Stark have a falling out after Stark fails to get a birthday present for Fern. Sein advises Fern that a young man like Stark cannot be expected to remember everything and she should treat him less harshly and be more honest with her feelings. Fern tries to apologize to Stark, but he apologizes first, admitting that he wanted to pick Fern's present together with her but was too nervous to do so. As Stark buys a new bracelet for Fern, Frieren praises Sein for being a "proper adult" like Heiter. On the way to the next village, Frieren notes the bracelet Stark bought for Fern has a similar design to a ring Himmel once bought her. A flying monster suddenly attacks their wagon, and while Frieren manages to kill it, the ring is lost in the confusion. As the party focus on repairing the wagon, Sein notes that the design on both the bracelet and ring is the mirrored lotus, which in the language of flowers symbolizes "eternal love". Stark is embarrassed at buying something with such intimate connotations, but Fern does not mind. Frieren searches for her ring and the merchant they are helping gives her a spell that can locate lost accessories. After Frieren recovers her ring, she recalls the time Himmel bought it for her. She picked out the ring initially, but in hindsight Himmel knew about its hidden meaning, for he gracefully placed it on her finger as if proposing to her.
15	15	"Smells Like Trouble"; Transliteration: "Yakkaigoto no Nioi" (Japanese: 厄介事の匂い)	Morio Asaka, Kazumasa Isogawa & Izumi Seguchi	Izumi Seguchi	Izumi Seguchi & Keita Nagasaka	December 15, 2023	4.0%
Frieren and her party arrive at a village and discover a monster has cursed its residents to sleep. Fern, Stark, and even Frieren succumb to the curse, with only Sein, being a priest, having resistance to curses. Sein manages to wake Frieren up long enough for her to kill the monster, even if he worried that a miscommunication may make things worse. Later, Frieren and her party reach the city of Vorig, the relay point to Äußerst. Just then, a noble named Orden sees Stark and asks him if he could pose as his slain son Wirt during an upcoming soiree to keep the morale among the people high, as they are told Wirt is alive from a recent battle and is recovering. Frieren initially refuses, but because they are running out of money, she relents when Orden offers to pay them in gold as well as a grimoire. Stark, and eventually Fern, has to learn proper etiquette before the coming soiree. They are both able to successfully play their roles at the soiree and it concludes without issue. Orden then offers Stark to stay at Vorig, but Stark declines, pointing out he cannot be a replacement for Wirt and Orden cannot be a replacement for his father. He also wishes to eventually return to Eisen to tell him about his adventure. As Frieren selects the grimoire she wants, Stark, Fern, and Sein watch Orden training his second son Mut.
16	16	"Long-Lived Friends"; Transliteration: "Chōju Tomodachi" (Japanese: 長寿友達)	Kōta Mori	Kōta Mori	Hidehiko Sawada, Daiki Tanaka, Keisuke Hiroe & Hirotoshi Arai	December 22, 2023	4.6%
Frieren decides to stop by a village to visit one of her old friends, an elderly dwarf named Old Man Voll who swore to protect the village in memory of his deceased human wife. Old Man Voll is delighted at Frieren's visit, and spends the next week catching up with her and training Stark. However, Frieren can tell that Old Man Voll is getting increasingly senile in his old age, and promises to carry on his memory in the future like she carries on the memory of Himmel, Heiter, and Eisen. Frieren and her party continue on towards Äußerst until Sein stops at the final crossroads before the city, asking the local village if they had seen his friend, nicknamed Gorilla Warrior. The only person who remembers where Gorilla Warrior went is a stubborn old woman who has the party complete several errands for her, with the final one being cleaning the statues of a pair of forgotten heroes. Frieren recognizes one of the statues as Kraft, while Sein remembers that an identical pair of statues were what inspired him and Gorilla Warrior to become adventurers in the first place. Sein then learns that Gorilla Warrior traveled in a different direction from Äußerst, putting him in a dilemma on whether to follow his trail or continue traveling with Frieren's party.
17	17	"Take Care"; Transliteration: "Jā Genki de" (Japanese: じゃあ元気で)	Taku Kimura & Haruka Yutoku	Yoshiaki Kawajiri	Karen Nozawa & Mayuko Kato	January 5, 2024	4.8%
As Sein takes his time to decide, the party stays at the village but their departure is halted when a snowstorm falls, keeping them in the village for an entire month. During this time, Fern gets angry at Stark and Sein discovers that it was because Stark accidentally grabbed her shoulder with too much strength, startling her. Sein convinces the two to make up and after the storm subsides, he leaves the party to look for Gorilla Warrior while Frieren and the rest set for Äußerst. On the way there, Fern gets sick and they stop in a small village to treat her. In the occasion, Frieren reveals to Stark that she usually grabs Fern's hand when she is sick to give some emotional support and reminisces when Himmel did the same for her when she was traveling with him. After Fern gets better, the party finally arrives at Äußerst in time for Frieren and Fern to take the First-Class Mage Exam.
18	18	"First-Class Mage Exam"; Transliteration: "Ikkyū Mahōtsukai Senbatsu Shiken" (Japanese: 一級魔法使い選抜試験)	Ken Andō	Tomoya Kitagawa	Shizuku Ishii, Shinya Kudo & Yi Jun Lin	January 12, 2024	4.5%
On the road to Äußerst, Fern and Frieren discuss the rarity of first-class mages and the difficulty of obtaining the certification to become one. Fern feels uncertain that she could pass the exam, but Frieren lets her know that mana capacity is not everything and that she herself has lost eleven times to people with a lower mana capacity than herself. Elsewhere, a mage named Übel is approached by three bandits; she taunts them, hoping to fight, but Kraft intervenes and fights them off. Kraft tells Übel that he was protecting the bandits from her, as he is aware she murdered a number of bandits. Übel introduces herself to him and they part ways. Fern and Frieren arrive at the association and manage to sign up for the first-class exam. After preparing for two months, they take the exam. Frieren is teamed with Lawine and Kanne, who are childhood friends and rivals while Fern ends up being teamed with Übel. The first test of the exam is to capture a Stille, but this proves to be no easy task as the bird moves faster than sound. Frieren is unsure of how to catch it due to Lawine and Kanne constantly bickering, but she notices they have almost flawless teamwork despite that. After Frieren saves her from a monster, Kanne confides that even though she does not like Lawine, she stays with her because Lawine can push her to improve herself. Kanne then mentions something she noticed about the Stille's behavior, which helps Frieren come up with a plan to capture one.
19	19	"Well-Laid Plans"; Transliteration: "Nyūnen na Keikaku" (Japanese: 入念な計画)	Fumie Muroi	Fumie Muroi	Takeo Shudou, Satoshi Shimada & Yūki Kitajima	January 19, 2024	4.2%
Fern and her party consisting of Übel and Land manage to catch a Stille and decide to lay back due to the threat from other mages who may want to steal their bird. After discussing with Kanne and Lawine, Frieren hatches a plan. They decide to freeze the lake within the testing grounds while infusing smaller pools of water with mana. Because the Stille are very sensitive to mana, leaving a single pool uncontaminated ensures that the Stille will flock to it by default when they are thirsty. Elsewhere, Denken's party observes the water freezing done by Lawine. Denken determines that Frieren's party must have a plan up their sleeves and decides they should pursue them to steal their Stille. Another party consisting of Ehre, Wirbel, and Schraf ambush Fern's party as they attempt to look for water and the two parties end up fighting over the captured Stille. During this fight, Frieren suppresses her mana near an uncontaminated pool of water and manages to capture an unsuspecting Stille. Denken's party detects her casting magic, and they ambush Frieren's party to try and take their Stille.
20	20	"Necessary Killing"; Transliteration: "Hitsuyō na Koroshi" (Japanese: 必要な殺し)	Yoshiki Kawasaki	Yoshiki Kawasaki	Kunihiko Hamada & Keita Nagasaka	January 26, 2024	4.2%
The battle between Fern's team and Wirbel's team continues. Fern defeats Ehre by overwhelming her with rapid-fire ordinary attack magic; Ehre remarks that Fern's magic is entirely devoid of character. Übel is restrained and defeated by Wirbel. However, Wirbel's hesitation in killing her immediately allows Fern to arrive in time to save Übel. Land easily defeats Scharf using illusion magic. Wirbel collects his defeated team members and shares his motivation for fighting demons. He reveals his history, explaining that he fights demons to impress a girl he loved back in his hometown. Their team manages to remain relevant in the exam as Wirbel comes across a Stille by luck and captures it with his binding magic. Laufen steals Frieren's team's Stille with a super-fast movement spell. Meanwhile, the remainder of Denken's team approaches Frieren's team as Laufen runs away. Denken reveals that he knows Frieren is the same legendary mage from the hero's party. Richter splits up Frieren's team and states he will kill either Lawine or Kanne so that Frieren's team cannot advance in the exams. Denken tells Richter to hold back unless absolutely necessary as the First Class mage title is not something worth killing over; however, Richter disagrees and talks about the privilege the title grants. Specifically, Serie, the leader of the Continental Mages Association, has promised that anyone who achieves the First Class title will be granted any one spell they request from her if she is capable of providing it. After they finish exchanging words, the two parties begin their battle.
21	21	"The World of Magic"; Transliteration: "Mahō no Sekai" (Japanese: 魔法の世界)	Kōta Mori	Kōta Mori & Keiichirō Saitō	Shinichi Yoshikawa	February 2, 2024	3.6%
A thousand years ago, Flamme introduces Frieren to Serie, who was her master. Serie offers any single spell to Frieren, but Frieren declines, stating that the best part of magic is the pursuit. Serie criticizes Frieren's apparent lack of ambition but Flamme states firmly that Frieren will be the one to defeat the Demon King. This is because Frieren can envision a peaceful era, unlike herself or Serie. In the present time, Frieren and Denken's parties engage in battle. Lawine and Kanne do their best to win, but the difference in mana compared to Richter is too great, and he manages to restrain them. He says he will spare them as long as Denken wins his fight. Denken uses high-level spells to overwhelm Frieren, but she reacts swiftly and manages to defeat him with a close-range magic blast. Frieren baits Laufen into the open by threatening to kill Denken. When Laufen attacks, Frieren intercepts her and recovers the Stille. After restraining the two, Denken reveals that he wants to become a first class mage so that he can return to his hometown which is located deep within the Northern Plateau. Aware that Richter will likely kill Kanne and Lawine due to Denken's loss, Frieren chooses to destroy Serie's barrier, shocking the examiners. With the barrier destroyed, rainfall reaches the exam area and Kanne uses her water magic to defeat Richter. Fern's team takes shelter in a cave, with Land warning them that they will be rivals in the second exam. As Frieren's team leaves, Denken's team escapes their bindings and finds a weakened party to attack and steal a Stille from. The first exam concludes and six successful teams are shown. The examiners congratulate them and announce a break before the next exam, which will take place in three days. Meanwhile, Stark waits at a Tavern for Frieren and Fern's return.
22	22	"Future Enemies"; Transliteration: "Tsugi kara wa Katakidōshi" (Japanese: 次からは敵同士)	Takahiro Natori	Takahiro Natori	See note for the ADs (Note: Yi Jun Lin, Ayano Suzuki, Shizuku Ishii, Yasunori Yamaguchi, Shinya Kudo, Eun-Young Lee, Dong Kim & Hirotoshi Arai)	February 9, 2024	3.7%
Frieren and Fern return to their lodging, where Fern berates Stark for drinking and staying up late at night. Frieren suggests improving Fern's mood by taking her out to dinner at a restaurant she visited 80 years ago. Richter meets Denken and Laufen at his storefront who ask him for directions to a restaurant Denken once visited as well. Land is approached by Übel, who explains that she can copy magic if she can empathize with the person who cast it. Übel demonstrates this by binding Land with Wirbel's spell, and tries to interrogate him in order to steal his cloning magic, but he convinces her that it is pointless. Denken's group finds the restaurant they were looking for and runs into Frieren's party as well as Land and Übel, but they choose to focus on their own meal. In a flashback, Himmel and his party are shown eating at the establishment, where the chef proclaims that his restaurant will always be exceptional and use the same flavors. In the present, Frieren remarks the food has not stayed the same but instead tastes much better than in the past. The next morning, Stark has to mediate an argument between Frieren and Fern, and they head out to get snacks. Lawine and Kanne spend the day together in town and run into Stark and the others at a bakery. While they are walking together as a larger group, Wirbel approaches Stark and recruits him for a monster-hunting request from the magic association. At the inn, Lawine and Kanne hand baked goods to Frieren to thank her for helping them pass the first test. Frieren recalls Himmel telling her that he became a hero because changing a person's life in even a small way will cause them to remember him long after he is gone. While Frieren and others talk, they receive the notification for the second test. Lawine and Kanne are discouraged after seeing that Sense is proctoring the test, since nobody has ever been able to pass her tests.
23	23	"Conquering the Labyrinth"; Transliteration: "Danjon Kōryaku" (Japanese: 迷宮攻略)	Kazumasa Isogawa	Yūsuke Kubo	Ayaka Tsuji	February 16, 2024	3.7%
Sense congratulates the 18 individuals who passed the first test and proceeds to outline the parameters of the second test. To pass the test, the examinees must reach the bottom of the 'Ruins of the King's Tomb' dungeon. Sense, a pacifist who despises fighting, declares that everyone reaching the bottom will pass. She also distributes bottles that if shattered, will summon a golem that will help the mage escape the dungeon, but using it will automatically fail the mage who uses it, making it a last resort. In addition, the bottles will automatically shatter at dawn of the next day, making that the time limit for the exam. An examinee notes that no adventuring party has ever successfully cleared this dungeon, but Sense retorts that a first-class mage should be up to the task. Denken suggests that all of the examinees work together to clear the dungeon, but they all remain mistrustful of each other and split off into separate groups. Sense decides to follow Frieren and Fern, and despite Frieren falling for mimics several times, they are able to progress deep into the dungeon. Frieren mentions she picked up a knack for exploring dungeons due to Himmel's love of exploring them. Sense asks what Fern's motivation to be a mage is since she cannot sense any ambition and determination in her, and Fern replies that she enjoys seeing Frieren happy. Meanwhile, both Wirbel and Denken's groups encounter replicas of themselves that can perfectly copy their magic and fighting styles. Denken's group manages to defeat a replica of Laufen, only to encounter a replica of Frieren afterwards.
24	24	"Perfect Replicas"; Transliteration: "Kanpeki na Fukuseitai" (Japanese: 完璧な複製体)	Hayato Kakinokida	Daiki Harashina	Daiki Harashina	February 23, 2024	3.7%
It is revealed the dungeon contains a creature known as a Spiegel that can read the memories of those who enter the dungeon and use that information to craft perfect replicas of the raiders. Denken's party attempt to confront the Frieren replica but are forced to withdraw. Übel and Land are cornered by an Übel replica. They successfully work together to destroy it, with Übel correctly guessing that Land would intervene to prevent her from dying for his sake. While exploring, Frieren uncovers a hidden section of the dungeon containing a long-lost mural. She, Fern, and Sense then make their way to the bottom of the dungeon where Denken's party is waiting. They warn Frieren about her replica and discuss methods they may use to defeat her. However, they realize Frieren is immune to restraint and hypnosis magic, so they will have to find another weakness to exploit. Edel's party runs into a replica of Sense. Edel tries to mind control it, but the replica does not have a mind and cannot be controlled. Edel is injured and is forced to break her bottle and escape. She orders her party members to retreat and warn the other mages about what they learned. In a separate fight, Wirbel's party manages to defeat their replicas by choosing favorable match-ups for each member. With no other ideas, Denken and Frieren conclude that brute force is their only option. Fern suggests that, with their assistance, she can kill the Frieren replica.
25	25	"A Fatal Vulnerability"; Transliteration: "Chimeiteki na Suki" (Japanese: 致命的な隙)	Tomoya Kitagawa	Tomoya Kitagawa	Yūsuke Yaegashi, Hiroyuki Kobashi, Keita Nagasaka & Shinichi Yoshikawa	March 1, 2024	4.4%
Dünste informs Denken's and Frieren's parties that Edel has retreated from the dungeon and that mind control is not an option against the replicas. Lawine and Kanne arrive at the scene and tell the parties that the monster they are facing is a Spiegel and that the replicas it creates have no unique weaknesses. Everyone present concludes that Frieren's replica must be defeated before they can destroy the Spiegel. Before heading into battle, Fern discloses Frieren's fatal weakness: she cannot detect mana when she casts a spell, a vulnerability typically found in beginner mages. After the discussion, Fern and Frieren are chosen to confront Frieren's replica. Everyone else remains in place to protect them from potential attacks by other replicas. Frieren and her replica are evenly matched, and Fern waits for an opening to hit the replica with Zoltraak. In a flashback, Frieren hands Serie a will from Flamme. The will reveals that Flamme convinced the human emperor to allow humans to adopt magic. Serie remarks that this is the start of the era of humans, and eventually human mages will be able to surpass even Elves like herself and Frieren. In the present, Fern strikes Frieren's replica directly with a full-power Zoltraak.
26	26	"The Height of Magic"; Transliteration: "Mahō no Takami" (Japanese: 魔法の高み)	Hirotaka Mori	Keiichirō Saitō, Daiki Harashina & Tōru Iwazawa	Keisuke Hiroe, Izumi Seguchi, Hirotoshi Arai & Yūsuke Yaegashi	March 8, 2024	4.1%
Fern's Zoltraak fails to kill the replica of Frieren. Frieren acknowledges that she anticipated her replica surviving the attack, noting that it was always destined to be a battle of attrition. At the entrance to the final part of the dungeon, Denken and Methode determine the locations of the remaining replicas and strategize on how best to combat them. The mages face off against their best match-ups and successfully eliminate a large number of replicas. Following Lawine and Richter's success in defeating replicas of Kanne and Lawine, they are ambushed by Sense's replica, which impales Richter and Lawine. Forced to break their bottles, Lawine and Richter are eliminated from the test. Denken, Land, and Übel arrive at the scene and decide on their next course of action. Übel claims she can beat Sense as she can visualize her cutting magic easily slicing apart Sense's hair magic. In a flashback, Übel managed to cut a first-class mage in half despite the incredibly high defense of their enchanted clothing. Sense explains that Übel can perceive clothing and hair as something she can easily cut; therefore, she should win the fight against her replica. In the present, Übel kills Sense's replica. Methode talks to Wirbel's party and gets their buy-in on the plan to delay the other replicas while Frieren's replica is being fought against. After Denken's team runs into resurrected replicas, they realize that until the Spiegel is defeated, the replicas will keep coming back to life. Frieren creates an opening, and Fern manages to inflict a lethal injury on the replica. However, when Fern attempts to finish off the replica, it counters with a telekinetic ability, nearly killing her. Impressed by the spell, Fern remarks that this attack is truly the height of magic. Frieren finishes off her replica, and they proceed to destroy the Spiegel. The remaining examinees reach the bottom of the dungeon, and Sense congratulates them for passing the second test. Meanwhile, the failed examinees wait at the entrance as their golems heal them.
27	27	"An Era of Humans"; Transliteration: "Ningen no Jidai" (Japanese: 人間の時代)	Ka Hee Im	Nobuhide Kariya	Nobuhide Kariya, Kanako Yoshida & Yuri Fujinaka	March 15, 2024	4.2%
Fern is upset with Frieren, feeling that Frieren does not comprehend her emotions. Fern confides in Stark that Frieren requested her to replace her staff, which had broken during the second exam. The staff, a gift from Heiter, held great sentimental value for Fern. Kanne comforts Lawine, who laments having to wait another three years before she can attempt the first-class exam again, while Denken gives words of encouragement to Richter. Frieren arrives to the shop after Denken leaves and convinces Richter to repair Fern's staff. After Fern and Stark return to the inn, Fern discovers her repaired staff and recalls Heiter telling her about Frieren's deep care for others. The third exam commences, and all participants await instructions. Serie says that she will personally proctor the final exam since Frieren's involvement caused more examinees to pass than intended. Serie decides she will conduct one-on-one interviews to determine who deserves the license. Frieren tells Fern that Serie will judge each candidate based on her own intuition and that her intuition is always correct. Examinees enter one at a time, and Serie evaluates them at a glance. She immediately fails Kanne for being weak willed, and later Laufen, Dünste, Ehre and Scharf for similar reasons. After Frieren enters, Serie also fails her, because Frieren is not interested in combat magic. Serie questions Frieren on how someone like her managed to defeat the demon king. Frieren responds that she had exceptional allies and could not have achieved it alone. She also points out that interestingly Flamme's flower spell which Serie hates was what inspired a young Himmel to become a hero and recruit Frieren into his party. Fern then enters and notices that Serie's mana is fluctuating similarly to Frieren's mana. Serie sees enormous potential in Fern and asks her to be her student, but Fern rejects the proposal. Unwilling to turn away such a promising mage, Serie relents and passes Fern.
28	28	"It Would Be Embarrassing When We Met Again"; Transliteration: "Mata Atta Toki ni Hazukashīkara ne" (Japanese: また会ったときに恥ずかしいからね)	Keiichirō Saitō	Keiichirō Saitō	Takasemaru, Daiki Harashina & Shinichi Yoshikawa	March 22, 2024	4.9%
Serie concludes her interviews with the remaining examinees, with Denken, Methode, Wirbel, Land and Übel passing by demonstrating either the requisite resolve or traits that align with her militaristic philosophy on magic. The candidates depart with mixed reactions. Later, Fern and Stark meet Denken and Laufen at a bakery, where Denken talks about his late wife. Meanwhile, Wirbel shares his belief in helping strangers, inspired by the hero Himmel, who assisted villages with everyday tasks because he could not turn a blind eye to those in need. The successful examinees then receive their first-class mage privileges, and a receptionist informs them that Serie has banned Frieren from all mage association buildings for a thousand years. Outside, Lernen challenges Frieren to a duel to secure his legacy, but she declines, noting that Serie remembers all her students' personalities and favourite spells, regardless of their historical impact. The next morning, Frieren's party leaves Äußerst. Fern reveals that she had asked for a spell to clean her clothes, which had greatly annoyed Serie. On the city's bridge, Lawine and Kanne thank Frieren for her assistance before both parties exchange a brief farewell. Fern observes the swiftness of their parting, which triggers a flashback to Himmel. He explains his aversion to tearful goodbyes, stating his belief that he will cross paths with people again and that an emotional farewell would be an embarrassment upon their eventual reunion. Following this, Frieren's party continues its journey toward Ende.

=== Season 2 (2026) ===
No. overall	No. in season	Title	Directed by	Storyboarded by	Animation directed by	Original release date	Viewership rating
29	1	"Shall We Go, Then?"; Transliteration: "Jā Ikō ka" (Japanese: じゃあ行こうか)	Tomoya Kitagawa	Tomoya Kitagawa	Takasemaru	January 16, 2026	4.7%
Continuing their journey to Ende, Frieren's party runs low on funds, and Fern determines that they need to head to the nearest town and find work. On their way to the town, the party falls through hollow ground and into a cave full of magic-nullifying crystals. Frieren and Fern are left powerless without the use of magic, and as such, Stark is relied on for protection. Their exploration of the cave goes smoothly until they run into a Venomous Apex Dragon. Stark realizes he is no match for the creature, grabs Frieren and Fern, then runs until he finds an exit out. After safely escaping, the party heads to a crossroads and come across an inn. They decide to spend the night there and run into Wirbel, who insists on trying to recruit Stark for defending the Northern Plateau from the encroaching demon threat. Frieren believes that Stark should have a choice in the matter, especially since travelling with two girls may feel awkward for him. Later at night, a concerned Fern reaches out to Stark, who tells her that he declined Wirbel's offer and that he loves his current role as party vanguard. He believes that working with Frieren and Fern has helped him grow as a person, and that there is no better place for him to be. In the morning, the party leaves the inn and sees off Wirbel's team, and they continue to head towards a village to find work.
30	2	"The Hero of the South"; Transliteration: "Minami no Yūsha" (Japanese: 南の勇者)	Nobuhiro Mutō	Tomoya Kitagawa	Keisuke Kojima & Yuri Fujinaka	January 23, 2026	4.6%
The party arrives in the town of Fabel and takes on a job cleaning a bronze statue of a hero. Stark is surprised to learn the statue is not of Himmel, but of another figure titled the Hero of the South. Frieren remarks that the Hero of the South was humanity's strongest hero, who felled three of the Seven Sages alone, along with Schlacht the Omniscient. In a flashback, the Hero of the South tries to persuade Frieren to join him, but she refuses. He tells her that he possesses perfect precognition and that the outcome was expected, then says that she will eventually meet Himmel, who will save the world with her in his party. The Hero of the South also foresaw his own death at Schlacht's hands, but was content to help clear a path for Himmel. Back in the present, the party finishes its job and heads towards a larger city run by Graf Dach. Frieren tries to shop and leave the city quickly, but is roped into a celebratory feast alongside her companions by the Graf. Dach pushes the party into accepting a request to retrieve a stolen sword, his family heirloom. After searching, the trio walk into a ruined village destroyed by the sword demon. The sword demon approaches the party while posing as a priestess, but Frieren spots the deception. The group defeats them and reclaims the sword. Frieren's party returns the sword to Dach and collect their reward. They receive a grimoire which contains a spell to turn red apples into green apples.
31	3	"Somewhere She'd Like"; Transliteration: "Suki na Basho" (Japanese: 好きな場所)	Youhei Tsuchiya	Youhei Tsuchiya	Feng Tao Xie & Runa Harano	January 30, 2026	4.5%
Moving through the Etwas Mountains region, the party arrives at a small village renowned for hot springs. Unfortunately, the local hot springs have since dried up, and the nearest town with hot springs is a week away. A villager tells the party that there is a hot spring hidden in the Etwas Mountains, although Frieren is reluctant to visit it. Stark pushes the party to go, and they face a perilous trek through the mountains. Before they arrive at the hot spring, they are intercepted by a three-headed hydra. Using Stark as bait, Frieren and Fern decapitate all three heads simultaneously in order to kill it. When they arrive at the hot spring, Fern remarks that it is quite shallow, but Stark is happy that he can share a footbath with the girls. The three have a relaxing time, although they remark that the experience was not worth the effort involved. A week later, the trio reaches the fortress city of Heiß on their journey and spend some time there. While Frieren enjoys the leisure time at the local hot springs and Stark finds productive things to do, Fern is left bored. Fern bluntly tells Stark that he is neglecting her and is an inconsiderate jerk. Stark decides to tease Fern by asking her on a date and is surprised she actually accepts his proposal. Worried about the date, he asks Frieren for help. Frieren shows Stark all sorts of places in the city that Fern might like, showcasing that she pays attention to Fern as her adoptive mother. Fern also asks Frieren for advice on how to approach the date; however, she decides that Frieren is out of touch and then goes to bed, still nervous about the date she will have with Stark.
32	4	"Other People's Homes"; Transliteration: "Dareka no Kokyō" (Japanese: 誰かの故郷)	Kentaro Hori	Izumi Seguchi	Izumi Seguchi	February 6, 2026	3.6%
Fern prepares for the date with Stark by picking out an outfit and doing her hair. The date starts with Stark and Fern conversing awkwardly while heading to the market. They spend the day shopping, eating, and sightseeing. Fern remarks sullenly that throughout the date they only talked about Frieren, and she appears displeased. Stark asks Fern if she enjoyed the date at all, as she never smiled once. Fern admits that the date was not what she expected, but she is glad that Stark tried his best. Later, as the party leaves the fortress city of Heiß, Frieren shows off her braids to Stark, telling him that Fern does these braids whenever she is happy. The party arrives at the Northern Plateau checkpoint. After the trio replenish their supplies, Fern presents a scroll confirming her first-class mage status, allowing the party to cross. The Northern Plateau is fraught with danger, forcing the party to stay on alert for three days and three nights. Reaching a village for rest, the innkeeper lets the party know that the village needs help with a powerful monster nearby. In the morning, the party leaves the village and faces off against the monster. The battle is hard-fought, but Stark manages to restrain the creature until Frieren blasts it with Zoltraak. Stark wonders why they did not opt for the sea route when the Northern Plateau is this dangerous. In a flashback, Himmel tells Frieren that he wants to travel through the Northern Plateau to help people who are in danger from the powerful monsters lurking in the region, because he wants to protect other people's homes.
33	5	"Logistics in the Northern Plateau"; Transliteration: "Hokubu Kōgen no Butsuryū" (Japanese: 北部高原の物流)	Hiroyuki Kobashi	Hiroyuki Kobashi	Hiroyuki Kobashi	February 13, 2026	2.9%
The trio arrive in the Bier region on the Northern Plateau. Over a meal, Frieren talks about the region specializing in making beer. After the party finishes eating, they run into a dwarf named Fass. Fass enlists Frieren's assistance to acquire Boshaft, a famous liquor served to emperors of the past. Within the mine that Boshaft is supposed to be stored in, the team arrives at an inscription written in Elvish. Milliarde, the elf who wrote the inscription, sealed the liquor in a powerful barrier to preserve it for the future. While Frieren could remove the barrier, she is reluctant, as it would be time-consuming work taking three months. Fass offers the party 20 gold coins, which sells Stark and Fern on the project. In a flashback, it is explained that Milliarde actually thought Boshaft tasted horrible, but she decided to write the inscription on a whim. Back in the present, Frieren shatters the barrier and everyone partakes in the liquor. While Fass acknowledges the liquor is terrible, he has a great time sharing the liquor with the village and has no regrets. Later, the party arrives at the Norm Company's fortress city. Frieren explains that the Norm Company handles the logistics in the Northern Plateau, allowing them to have a nice city full of goods. While moving through the city, Frieren is apprehended for debt evasion and enslaved. The company owner tells Frieren the company has fallen on hard times and needs more wealth to survive. Taken to a mine, Frieren assists the mine workers in finding rare silver ores, doing 300 years' worth of work in a day. Frieren is freed, and the party moves on.
34	6	"A Demon-Slaying Request"; Transliteration: "Tōbatsu Yōsei" (Japanese: 討伐要請)	Nobuhiro Mutō	Daiki Harashina	Daiki Harashina	February 27, 2026 (Note: Episode 34 was delayed by one week due to coverage of the 2026 Winter Olympics.)	3.6%
A man cowers in fear, hiding in a village under siege. Villagers fight the demons attacking the village the best they can. However, they are completely massacred, down to the women and children. A single human combatant manages to get a message out of the village before it completely falls. Later on, Methode and Genau arrive at the ruins of the village after receiving a demon-slaying request from the great mage Serie. They clean up the straggler demons and look for clues about who attacked the village. Genau finds the man who was hiding from the demons, and he comforts him in his dying moments. Genau tells Methode that he knew the man, as the village they are in was his hometown, and that he used to play with the victim as a child. While talking, Genau and Methode realize they are surrounded and prepare to fight. The church they are in is ambushed, but it turns out to be a case of mistaken identity. The duo run into Frieren's party, who also received a similar request from Serie. While investigating the bodies, Genau points out that the victims include members of the Norm Company's private militia, including a warrior who was far superior to Stark. Given that the demons he and Methode killed were small fry, he deduces that the demon who led the attack on his hometown is still alive. He requests that Frieren's party assist him in hunting down the lead demon. The group analyze the attacks and come to the conclusion that the demon that led the attack must have wielded four swords.
35	7	"The Divine Revolte"; Transliteration: "Shingi no Revorute" (Japanese: 神技のレヴォルテ)	Aimi Yamauchi	Daiki Harashina & Keiichirō Saitō	Shinichi Yoshikawa	March 7, 2026 (Note: Episode 35 aired at 12:00 a.m. JST, an hour after the original air time on Nippon TV.)	3.0%
In a flashback, Serie tells Methode that Genau's partner died in battle, and so Methode will have to accompany him to the Northern Plateau. Later on, Genau reminisces over his partner, whom he considered to be a genuinely great person but a naive combatant. Genau tells Methode that his partner died fighting to save a child instead of focusing on killing the demon, which he thought was ridiculous. In the present, the team of five work together to plan their approach to take out the exceptional demon they identified as having led the attack on the village. The demon is revealed to be a four-armed giant with a half-snake body named Revolte, and his accomplice tells him that the first-class mage party looks like interesting prey. Revolte tells his accomplice that humans tend to watch over the corpses of their fallen and decides the best time to attack is when the party splits up. The party splits up as Revolte predicted, with the girls scouting for the demons at the nearby fortress and Genau, along with Stark, staying at the town. Fern, Frieren, and Methode head towards the fortress and talk. Methode gives Frieren a grimoire in exchange for Frieren letting her pat her head. While the party is messing around, the demons detect them. A demon boy casts a spell covering the forest in fog, and the demons proceed to saturate the area with magic artillery. While avoiding the attacks, Methode is separated from the group. The fog demon targets Fern and Frieren, while the female demon goes after Methode. Back at the town, the male pair talk about who the demon is, and Genau tells Stark that the lead demon is likely the Divine Revolte, the demon that killed his partner. Genau and Stark are ambushed by the Divine Revolte. The pair start fighting him after refusing to talk to him.
36	8	"A Magnificent End"; Transliteration: "Rippana Saigo" (Japanese: 立派な最期)	Kouki Fujimoto	Kouki Fujimoto	Keita Nagasaka	March 13, 2026	4.2%
Genau and Stark continue their onslaught against Revolte, but he handles their attacks easily. Realizing they cannot beat Revolte through skill alone, Stark intentionally lets himself be hit to distract him. Genau slices off Revolte's tail and injures him. On the ropes, Revolte tries to stall for time by talking. Genau attempts to finish him off, but Revolte tricks Genau into believing a child is still on the battlefield. Revolte throws a sword at the "child", forcing Genau to save her, but the child is a demon in disguise. The demon girl stabs Genau in the torso, severely wounding him. She asks Revolte for praise and gets distracted, allowing Genau to kill her with a single slice of his wings. Revolte taunts Genau for falling for the trick and says the fight confirmed his theory that humans care for their young. In a flashback, Serie says that Genau's old partner was too kind for his own good, which is what got him killed. Genau pushes back, telling Serie that his partner had a magnificent end. As Revolte prepares the final blow, Genau braces himself, but Stark intervenes at the last second and blocks the attack. Meanwhile, Fern continues battling the fog demon. She tries to fight stealthily, but the demon's ability allows him to track her easily. Methode also continues her fight, narrowly avoiding deadly blows. Realizing Fern is in danger, Methode decides to dispel the fog. She fights using illusions and nonlethal attacks while analyzing the spell. After a while, she dispels it, removing the fog demon's advantage. Without the fog, Fern kills Hemmung, and the demon that was fighting Methode is also defeated. Back in the fight with Revolte, Stark breaks one of Revolte's swords, and the pair shift their strategy to disarming him. They manage to destroy his blades, but he catches them off guard by extending his arms and impaling both of them. Revolte mocks the two, but he lets his guard down, allowing Stark to deal a fatal blow through sheer tenacity. With the demons dead, Genau and Stark pass out from their injuries. They wake up to Methode healing them, and the party celebrates their win. After some time passes, everyone recovers, and the two parties head their separate ways.
37	9	"Himmel's Memoirs"; Transliteration: "Himmeru no Jiden" (Japanese: ヒンメルの自伝)	Youhei Tsuchiya	Youhei Tsuchiya	Runa Harano	March 20, 2026	3.6%
On a carriage, Denken reads a letter and then continues his journey to visit his wife's grave on foot. Frieren's party arrives in a town in the region of Drachen, which was damaged by a dragon. An elderly man requests that the party slay a swarm of dragons that have made a nest nearby. While apprehensive at first, Frieren accepts the quest in exchange for a grimoire as payment. After the party finds the dragons' nest, they attack. Stark takes the dragons head-on while the girls shoot spells from afar. Despite taking some damage, Stark finishes off the nest. After receiving their reward, Fern asks Frieren why she always asks for payment. In a flashback, it is shown that Himmel always asked for payment, explaining that he does not want villagers to feel indebted to the hero's party. One reward received in the past was a notebook, which was used to write Himmel's Memoirs. In the present, the party arrives at Lake Korridor, the largest body of water in the Northern Plateau. Due to severe weather, the party is forced to rest and take shelter. Due to the difficulty in traversing the terrain, the party decides to wait a few months until the weather clears up. After winter ends, the party decides to take a ferry across the lake. However, as they have run out of funds, they instead have to pay the ferryman with a favor. The captain asks the party to obtain Himmel's Memoirs from an island nearby, and says that it would be sufficient as compensation. On the island, Frieren pops the barrier around the monastery that houses the memoirs. Frieren reads the memoirs and hands them to the captain as payment, but the captain tells Frieren that he knows she was the elf in the hero's party and asks her to keep it. The trio continue their journey across the lake, defeating a kraken on the way.
38	10	"A Beautiful Sight"; Transliteration: "Utsukushī Kōkei" (Japanese: 美しい光景)	Kentaro Hori	Tomoya Kitagawa	Ayaka Sato	March 27, 2026	4.5%
On the Northern Plateau, the party comes across the deepest canyon on the continent, at 3000 meters deep. Due to its width and the strong winds, the party decides not to jump over or fly across the canyon and instead look for an alternate route. Upstream, they run into a bridge built by a dwarf named Gehen over centuries. Frieren is surprised the bridge is not more popular, but it is quickly shown that dangerous bird monsters attack those who cross it. Frieren's party decides to clear out the nest of monsters. In a flashback, it is shown how important the bridge is and how long it took to build. Afterwards, the nearby town, which formed over the years the bridge was built, celebrates with the party. Further north, the trio run low on funds again and take on a job to kill a monster near a mineral deposit. The fight is difficult as the giant wolf-like beast senses mana. However, Fern manages to kill it from outside the maximum mana detection range. Due to the weather and time of day, the party camps overnight. In the morning, Fern wakes Frieren up to show her the beautiful Holy Snow Crystals during sunrise. Frieren remarks that they have finally reached an era where many humans can explore the Northern Plateau and witness such a beautiful sight. In another location on the Northern Plateau, Edel, Lernen, and Denken are having a meeting. Edel transfers the information regarding Denken's mission directly into his memories. As Denken moves forward towards the golden city, Lernen remarks that Denken intends to fight the greatest of the Seven Sages of Destruction, Macht of the Golden Land.

== Spell That Does OOO ==
=== Part 1 (2023–2024) ===
No. overall	No. in part	Title	Directed by	Storyboarded by	Animation directed by	Original release date
Regular shorts
1	1	"Spell That Makes You Say What You're Thinking"; Transliteration: "Kangaete iru Koto o Itte Shimau Mahō" (Japanese: 考えていることを言ってしまう魔法)	Mayo Nozaki	Tetsuya Miyanishi	Miki Takeshita	October 11, 2023
Heiter advises Frieren that a certain spell from a grimoire is dangerous because it "destroys relationships", but Frieren tests the spell on Himmel nonetheless. The rest of Himmel's party hear what Himmel is thinking: he thinks that himself is handsome in any circumstances. Heiter then says that hearing what someone is thinking is not always a good thing.
2	2	"Spell That Removes Alcohol Content from Alcoholic Beverages"; Transliteration: "Osake kara Arukōru Dake o Nuku Mahō" (Japanese: お酒からアルコールだけを抜く魔法)	Mayo Nozaki	Tetsuya Miyanishi	Yukiko Watabe	October 25, 2023
At a bar, Frieren tests a spell over the mugs of beer. Frieren, Eisen and Himmel then drink the alcohol-free beer, which, to them, tastes the same as one with alcohol. However, Heiter, who is obsessed with alcoholic beverages, notices a subtle difference.
3	3	"Spell That Allows You to Wake Up at a Specific Time in the Morning"; Transliteration: "Asa Kimatta Jikan ni Okireru yō ni Naru Mahō" (Japanese: 朝決まった時間に起きれるようになる魔法)	Mayo Nozaki	Yūshi Ibe	Miki Takeshita	November 15, 2023
As Frieren always wakes up from her sleep much later in a late morning, Fern casts a spell on Frieren to force her to get up at 6 in the morning. The next morning, Frieren awakes exactly at 6 in the morning, but still appears to be sleepy. As Frieren and Fern was about to have a breakfast meal, Frieren is fallen asleep again. Then, Fern starts reading a grimoire to look for a spell to prevent a person to fall asleep again.
4	4	"Spell That Makes Your Body Smell Good"; Transliteration: "Karada kara ii Nioi ga Deru Mahō" (Japanese: 体から良いにおいが出る魔法)	Mayo Nozaki	Mayo Nozaki	Yukiko Watabe	November 29, 2023
Frieren and Fern discuss what exactly is "good" about a body scent spell, before Frieren tries it on Stark, who then starts smelling like grilled meat. Stark asks Frieren and Fern what to have for dinner that night, and the women answer that they would like to eat meat, which immediately scares Stark.
5	5	"Spell That Makes You Lucky"; Transliteration: "Un ga Yoku Naru Mahō" (Japanese: 運がよくなる魔法)	Mayo Nozaki	Mayo Nozaki	Miki Takeshita	December 27, 2023
Frieren tries a spell that makes someone lucky on Stark, who then goes on to pick a path with fewer monsters to encounter, and win a lottery (the prize of which is high-quality meat). Sein then asks Frieren to cast the same spell on him, but the spell does not work on Sein, who is addicted to gambling, as he returns to Frieren's party with nothing but his underwear.
6	6	"Spell to Remove Tough Oil Stains"; Transliteration: "Shitsukoi Aburayogore o Otosu Mahō" (Japanese: しつこい油汚れを落とす魔法)	Mayo Nozaki	Mayo Nozaki	Miki Takeshita	January 10, 2024
Sein asks Frieren if their party could make money using the spell that removes tough oil stains from kitchenwares. Soon, many villagers turn up with oil-stained kitchenwares to Frieren, who now has to handle so many requests, and then calls Fern for help.
7	7	"Spell That Allows You to Speak Quickly and Clearly"; Transliteration: "Monosugoku Hayakuchi ni Yodomi Naku Shabereru Mahō" (Japanese: ものすごく早口に澱みなく喋れる魔法)	Mayo Nozaki	Yūshi Ibe	Miki Takeshita	January 24, 2024
Frieren casts a language skill spell on Eisen. With the spell, Eisen speaks more efficiently than before. But as Eisen recounts an earlier battle Himmel's party fought, his movement gets faster as he speaks. Frieren and Heiter then think that Eisen has gone out of his character.
8	8	"Spell That Detects the Thoughts of Fish"; Transliteration: "Sakana no Kimochi ga Wakaru Mahō" (Japanese: 魚の気持ちがわかる魔法)	Mayo Nozaki	Mayo Nozaki	Yukiko Watabe	February 7, 2024
As Stark returns to Frieren and Fern with three fishes he caught, Frieren tries a mind-reading spell on the fishes. Soon, Frieren and Fern hear from the fishes who complain about their upcoming fate. Frieren then decides that she would eat something else, and Fern tells Stark to release the fishes back.
9	9	"Spell That Makes You Lucky, Part 2"; Transliteration: "Un ga Yoku Naru Mahō - Sono Ni" (Japanese: 運が良くなる魔法 その2)	Mayo Nozaki	Tetsuya Miyanishi	Yukiko Watabe	February 19, 2024
Inside a dungeon, there are three closed treasure chests in front of Frieren's party. Fern guesses that at least one of the three chests could be a mimic chest. Stark then asks for a spell that makes someone lucky. The first chest opened has treasures, the second one has a grimoire, and the third and last one opened is a mimic chest. Fern then asks Frieren if she picked the third one on purpose.
10	10	"Spell That Makes You End Your Sentences Oddly"; Transliteration: "Gobi ga Hen na Fū ni Naru Mahō" (Japanese: 語尾が変なふうになる魔法)	Mayo Nozaki	Mayo Nozaki	Yukiko Watabe	March 11, 2024
Frieren discovers a grimoire with an unusual language skill spell. Among Himmel's party, Heiter finds the spell interesting, and suggests the spell to be cast on all party members, whoever laughs first loses the game, and other members use the loser's odd sentence ending for a week, which Himmel agrees. Himmel, Frieren and Heiter each end their words with an odd ending, but, not so sure about what have come out so far, they hold their laughter, and wait for Eisen's turn. In the end, everyone but Eisen burst out laughter.
11	11	"Spell to Make Clothes Clean and Spotless"; Transliteration: "Fuku no Yogore o Kirei Sappari Otosu Mahō" (Japanese: 服の汚れをきれいさっぱり落とす魔法)	Mayo Nozaki	Mayo Nozaki	Yukiko Watabe	March 24, 2024
Just as Frieren's party discuss the clothes cleaning spell Fern has acquired from Serie, Frieren accidentally spills a spoonful of soup on her clothes, which allows Fern to demonstrate the said spell. Impressed by the spell, Stark quickly travels into a forest, which makes his clothes heavily stained. Fern, however, refuses to cast the spell on Stark because he got his clothes dirty on purpose.
Sponsored short
SP	SP	(Official English title not available); Transliteration: "Shokutaku o Shiawase ni Suru Mahō" (Japanese: 食卓をしあわせにする魔法) (lit. 'The Magic That Brings Happiness to the Dinner Table')	Mayo Nozaki	Mayo Nozaki	Miki Takeshita	December 14, 2023
Frieren, Fern and Stark are gathered around fire to cook chunks of meat, and Fern tests a spell from a grimoire. The spell summons a bottle of Ajipon sauce, which is then poured over meats. Frieren's party are satisfied by the taste of cooked meat. Stark then wonders if the sauce also enhances the taste of a dragon meat, and the rest of the party encourages him to slay one immediately. Note: This short is sponsored by Mizkan's Ajipon brand of ponzu sauce and not included in any of the home media releases.

=== Part 2 (2025) ===
No. overall	No. in part	Title	Directed by	Storyboarded by	Animation directed by	Original release date
12	1	(Official English title not available); Transliteration: "Shinchō ga Nobiru Mahō" (Japanese: 身長が伸びる魔法) (lit. 'The Magic to Make One Taller')	Mayo Nozaki	Tetsuya Miyanishi	Yukiko Watabe	April 2, 2025
After she destroys a demon, Frieren receives a headpat from Heiter, who then apologises and explains that it was because the height difference between them was just right enough for him to pat her. Frieren is then reminded of a body height extension spell she received earlier as a payment for work. Soon, Frieren, who is now the tallest in Himmel's party, appeals that no one can give her a headpat. However, both Himmel and Heiter give a comment that Frieren has lost what makes her Frieren, which makes her uncomfortable. Eisen, a dwarf, then asks Frieren to make him taller too. Seeing a taller Eisen, the rest of the party agree that Eisen has lost what makes him Eisen, which makes him uncomfortable.
13	2	(Official English title not available); Transliteration: "Onaka Ippai ni Naru Mahō" (Japanese: おなかいっぱいになる魔法) (lit. 'The Magic to Fill One's Stomach')	Mayo Nozaki	Mayo Nozaki	Yukiko Watabe	May 7, 2025
Stark is hungry, but Fern asks him to endure because Frieren's party are approaching a town soon. Frieren says there is a spell to make someone's stomach feel full immediately, but continues that she does not recommend it. Stark then asks Frieren to cast the spell on him, and he is satisfied with it. The party soon arrive at a restaurant, and Stark complains that he wants to have a meal despite already feeling full. Having finished his meal, Stark's stomach is bloated. Stark asks Frieren to cast a spell to make him hungry, but Frieren says she has no knowledge about it.
14	3	(Official English title not available); Transliteration: "Daitai-nan Demo Kiru Mahō" (Japanese: 大体なんでも切る魔法) (lit. 'The Magic That Can Cut Almost Anything')	Mayo Nozaki	Tetsuya Miyanishi	Yukiko Watabe	June 4, 2025
Land asks Übel if her cutting spell has a use outside combat situations. Übel asks Land back which circumstance would the spell be useful for, and Land mentions cooking. Since she has a free time, Übel tries to use the inn's kitchen to test the spell for such situation. As there is no customer around that time, the inn's chef allows Übel to cook lunch for him. The chef and Land find Übel's spell effective in cutting the indegrients at a right amount, but soon, it is discovered that Übel has no talent in cooking at all.
15	4	(Official English title not available); Transliteration: "Kōsoku de Idō Suru Mahō" (Japanese: 高速で移動する魔法) (lit. 'The Magic That Allows One to Move at High Speed')	Mayo Nozaki	Tetsuya Miyanishi	Yukiko Watabe	July 3, 2025
Richter expresses his complaint towards Denken and Laufen because the two visit Richter's store like everyday. In addition, Richter comments that Denken and Laufen are getting along like if they were grandfather and granddaughter. Laufen says she is hungry, but Richter says there is nothing to eat. Laufen then uses her high speed moving spell to check Richter's kitchen. As Laufen calls Denken 'grandfather', Denken gives Laufen a coin, and Laufen uses the same spell to buy a doughnut.
16	5	(Official English title not available); Transliteration: "Karada no Mawari o Suzushiku Suru Mahō" (Japanese: 体のまわりを涼しくする魔法) (lit. 'The Magic That Cools the Area Around One's Body')	Mayo Nozaki	Mayo Nozaki	Yukiko Watabe	August 6, 2025
In a hot summer, Frieren's party are roaming in a particularly warmer area. Stark wants to take a rest in a shade under a big tree until the sun goes down, but Fern insists that the party needs to get into a town within a daytime because they have no food. Frieren then remembers a spell that cools down the area around someone's body, which she seldom used before. Stark asks Frieren to cast the spell anyway. The party are initially satisfied with the spell, but it gets colder than expected, and they each wear a coat. Stark asks Frieren to adjust the coolness, but Frieren just remembered that it cannot be adjusted. Fern then asks Frieren to undo the spell, but Frieren just realises that she fotgot how to undo it, since she has not used the spell for a long time. The party members end up wearing down-to-ankle hooded down jacket.
17	6	(Official English title not available); Transliteration: "Tokui Waza o Fūjiru Mahō" (Japanese: 得意技を封じる魔法) (lit. 'The Magic That Seals Away One's Special Move')	Natsumi Mamada	Natsumi Mamada	Yukiko Watabe	September 3, 2025
Just as a demon was about to use its special move, Frieren uses a spell to block it. The demon panics because it cannot use the move, before Eisen slashes it. Heiter praises the spell, but Eisen wonders if it only blocks a particular skill one is highly specialised in, and Himmel joins in the debate. Heiter then suggests that Frieren cast the spell on Himmel, and then Himmel and Eisen fight each other in a wood branch duel. As Himmel and Eisen begin a fight, Himmel cannot make a move at all. Turns out, Himmel's special move was a 'handsome guy pose'.

=== Part 3 (2026) ===
No. overall	No. in part	Title	Directed by	Storyboarded by	Animation directed by	Original release date
18	1	(Official English title not available); Transliteration: "Mitakino o Kōsoku Suru Mahō" (Japanese: 見た者を拘束する魔法) (lit. 'The Magic That Binds Those Who See It')	Natsumi Mamada	Tetsuya Miyanishi	Miki Minagawa	January 19, 2026
Wirbel gives up on turning Stark into his companion, but then Frieren asks if one cannot escape Wirbel's binding spell, and Wirbel offers to test the spell on Frieren. Once Frieren's party witness how effective is Wirbel's spell, they insist Wirbel to try it on animals like a flying bird, a rampaging bull, and a jumping fish. Fern says that the spell would be useful when they have no food or when they are hunting something, Frieren thinks that each party will need a person who can cast the spell, and Stark offers Wirbel to join Frieren's party, but Wirbel declines.
19	2	(Official English title not available); Transliteration: "Dōshin ni Kaeru Mahō" (Japanese: 童心に還る魔法) (lit. 'The Magic of Returning to One's Childlike Innocence')	Yukiko Watabe	Yukiko Watabe	Yukiko Watabe	February 2, 2026
Himmel is posing for a statue, but he changes his position frequently that the artist cannot decide on which one to use. Frieren is reminded that Heiter and Himmel are childhood friends, and asks Heiter if Himmel was like this when he was a child: Heiter answers that Himmel was not like that. Eisen guesses Himmel may have changed at a certain point. Frieren then offers to cast a spell that brings back someone's childlike innocence on Himmel, hoping that, once the childhood mindset is back on Himmel, the posing job will end soon. The spell is successful, but Himmel still changes his position too often, meaning that Himmel was what he is now even when he was a child.
20	3	(Official English title not available); Transliteration: "Kokoro to Karada ga Irekawaru Mahō" (Japanese: 心と体が入れ替わる魔法) (lit. 'The Magic That Swaps Mind And Body')	Natsumi Mamada	Natsumi Mamada	Miki Minagawa	February 17, 2026
As a payment for work, Frieren acquires a grimoire with a spell that exchanges each other's mind, but Fern insists not to use the spell, as Fern thinks it will embarrass everyone around. Stark is interested, and says that he wants to exchange his and Eisen's. Frieren insists on trying the spell, and exchanges her and Fern's. The spell is successful, but after a few days, Fern (in Frieren's body) insists Frieren (in Fern's body) to undo the spell.
21	4	(Official English title not available); Transliteration: "O-Sentaku no Mahō" (Japanese: お洗濯の魔法) (lit. 'The Magic of Laundry')	Natsumi Mamada	Tetsuya Miyanishi	Yukiko Watabe	March 2, 2026
Fern has passed the First Class Mage exam, and Serie offers to teach Fern a special spell. Fern, after taking some time, asks for a laundry spell. Serie suggests a variety of laundry spells, but Fern wonders if Serie is hiding a legendary spell that is at the core of laundry. Reluctantly, Serie says that there is a spell that completely removes stains from clothes, which Fern accepts. The other day, Serie questions Sense (who uses magic with her hair) that, if Serie was teaching a special spell to Sense now, what would be Sense's favourite; Sense answers that it would be the spell that simplifies the care of her hair.
22	5	(Official English title not available); Transliteration: "Kangaete Iru Koto o Itte Shimau Mahō - Sono Ni" (Japanese: 考えていることを言ってしまう魔法 その2) (lit. 'Spell That Makes You Say What You're Thinking, Part 2')	Atsushi Takeyama	Atsushi Takeyama	Miki Minagawa	March 16, 2026
After defeating demons (who were Revolte's henchmen), Frieren, Fern and Methode are about to head back to where Stark is. Methode (who is obsessed with cute women who are shorter than her in body height) asks if she can give Frieren a headpat again, but Fern rejects the offer. On the way back to where Stark is, Frieren and Fern are curious about what Methode is thinking, and Frieren casts a spell that lets someone say what one is thinking audibly on Methode. It turns out that, not only giving Frieren a headpat, Methode also wants to give Frieren a tight hug and a cheek-to-cheek contact, and do the same on Fern, Serie and Sense. After that, Methode, who is now also worried about Genau, suggests Frieren and Fern to hurry up. Frieren and Fern are suddenly hiding behind a tree, and Frieren asks Methode to walk in front of the two.

=== Sponsored short (2026) ===
No. overall	No. in part	Title	Directed by	Storyboarded by	Animation directed by	Original release date
SP	SP	(Official English title not available); Transliteration: "Akogare ni Hitareru Mahō" (Japanese: 憧れにひたれる魔法) (lit. 'The Magic of Being Immersed in Longing')	Natsumi Mamada	Tetsuya Miyanishi	Yukiko Watabe	May 22, 2026
Himmel's party is discussing a grimoire they just found in a dungeon. It contains a spell that allows someone to immerse into the world they are dreaming about. Since Frieren does not know what "dreaming about" means, she asks the others what they dream about. Heiter says he wants to be immersed into a world where he can drink as much alcohol as he wants. Himmel says he wants to be immersed into a world full of statues and portraits of himself so that his handsome appearance will be seen by everyone forever. Eisen says he wants to be immersed into a world where all the grapes taste sour. Once Frieren opens the grimoire, she sees a mention of "USJ," described as "the place where everyone can have heart-pounding adventures". Himmel's party agrees to go there, and Frieren casts the spell. (The episode ends at that point, and the video segues into an advertisement for Universal Studios Japan). Note: This short is sponsored by Universal Studios Japan (USJ) theme park, which is hosting two Frieren-themed pop-up attractions and a restaurant between May 2026 and January 2027.

== Home media release ==
=== Japanese ===
Toho Animation (Japan – Region 2/A)
Vol.	Episodes	Cover character(s)	Release date	Ref.
Season 1
1	1–4	Frieren	January 24, 2024	
2	5–8	Fern	February 21, 2024	
3	9–12	Stark	March 20, 2024	
4	13–16	Sein	April 17, 2024	
5	17–20	Flamme and Frieren	May 22, 2024	
6	21–24	Frieren, Himmel, Heiter and Eisen	June 19, 2024	
7	25–28	Frieren, Fern and Stark	July 17, 2024	
Season 2
1	29–32	Frieren	April 15, 2026	
2	33–35	Fern	May 20, 2026	
3	36–38	Stark	June 17, 2026	

=== English ===
Crunchyroll, LLC (North America – Region 1/A)
Part	Discs	Episodes	Release date	Ref.
1	2 (BD); 3 (DVD)	1–16	December 17, 2024	
2	2 (BD); 2 (DVD)	17–28	September 23, 2025	
