= Frieren (TV series) =

Japanese anime television series

Frieren: Beyond Journey's End
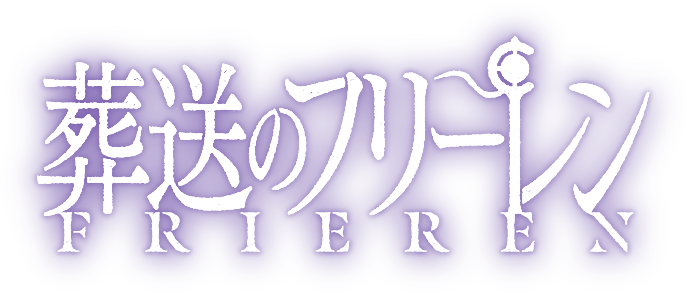
- 葬送のフリーレン; Sōsō no Furīren
- Genre: Adventure; Drama; Fantasy
- Based on: Frieren: Beyond; Journey's End by Kanehito Yamada and Tsukasa Abe
- Screenplay by: Tomohiro Suzuki
- Directed by: Keiichirō Saitō (S1); Tomoya Kitagawa (S2)
- Voices of: Atsumi Tanezaki; Kana Ichinose; Chiaki Kobayashi; Nobuhiko Okamoto; Hiroki Tōchi; Yōji Ueda
- Music by: Evan Call
- Opening theme: List: "Yūsha" by Yoasobi (S1A); "Haru" by Yorushika (S1B); "Lulu" by Mrs. Green Apple (S2)
- Ending theme: List: "Anytime Anywhere" by Milet (S1); "Bliss" by Milet (S1SP); "The Story of Us" by Milet (S2)
- Country of origin: Japan
- Original language: Japanese
- No. of seasons: 2
- No. of episodes: 38 (list of episodes)

Production
- Producers: Atsushi Takahashi (chief); Katsuhiro Takei (chief); Shoichiro Taguchi; Taisuke Shikama; Ayuri Taguchi; Ruriko Kikuchi
- Cinematography: Akane Fushihara
- Animator: Madhouse
- Editor: Kashiko Kimura
- Running time: 24 minutes
- Production companies: "Frieren: Beyond; Journey's End" Production Committee (Note: Label consisting of numerous companies)

Original release
- Network: Nippon Television
- Release: September 29, 2023 – present

Frieren: Beyond Journey's End (葬送のフリーレン, Sōsō no Furīren) is a Japanese anime television series produced by Madhouse based on the manga series Frieren: Beyond Journey's End, written by Kanehito Yamada and illustrated by Tsukasa Abe. The first season is directed by Keiichirō Saitō, while Tomoya Kitagawa directed the second, with scripts by Tomohiro Suzuki and character designs by Reiko Nagasawa. The music is composed by Evan Call.

The series premiered as the inaugural program of Nippon Television's Friday Anime Night programming block on September 29, 2023, with a special two-hour cut of the first four episodes, and concluded its first season on March 22, 2024. A second season aired from January 16 to March 27, 2026. A third season is set to premiere in October 2027. Toho Animation handled and distributed the series within Japan and is streaming domestically on Netflix, U-NEXT and Amazon Prime Video. Outside of Japan, Toho International sublicensed the series to Crunchyroll and Netflix while Muse Communication handled distribution in various Asian territories.

The series has received widespread acclaim, with critics lauding the story, animation, voice acting, action sequences, emotional depth, soundtrack and the title character, and has won several awards.

== Synopsis ==
Following the conclusion of a ten-year quest, the hero party, comprising the elven mage Frieren, the human hero Himmel, the dwarven warrior Eisen, and the human priest Heiter, have successfully defeated the Demon King and restored peace to the land. As an elf with a lifespan of over a thousand years, Frieren views their decade-long journey as a mere fraction of her life. Upon the party's return, they witness the Era Meteors, a celestial event occurring once every fifty years. Frieren promises to meet them again when the meteors return before departing to continue her solitary pursuit of magical knowledge.

Fifty years later, Frieren returns to find her former companions aged and at the end of their lives. After attending Himmel's funeral, she is struck by a profound sense of guilt and regret for not having made an effort to truly know him or understand the brevity of human existence. Following the subsequent passing of Heiter, Frieren begins a new journey northward to the land of Aureole, the place where souls are said to rest, hoping to speak with Himmel one last time.

Accompanying her is Fern, an orphan apprentice mage taken in by Heiter, and later Stark, a young warrior trained by Eisen. Unlike her previous adventure, this journey focuses on Frieren's internal growth as she retraces her old steps, discovering how the small actions of her former comrades shaped the world and its people. The narrative explores themes of legacy, memory, and the importance of the fleeting moments shared between friends.

== Series overview ==
Season	Episodes	Originally released	
Season	Episodes	First released	Last released
1	28	September 29, 2023	March 22, 2024
2	10	January 16, 2026	March 27, 2026
3	TBA	October 2027	TBA

== Cast and characters ==
Character	Japanese	English
Frieren	Atsumi Tanezaki	Mallorie Rodak
Fern	Kana Ichinose	Jill Harris
Stark	Chiaki Kobayashi	Jordan Dash Cruz (adult); Brittney Karbowski (child)
Himmel	Nobuhiko Okamoto	Clifford Chapin
Heiter	Hiroki Tōchi	Jason Douglas
Eisen	Yōji Ueda	Christopher Guerrero
Sein	Yuichi Nakamura	Christopher Wehkamp
Denken	Jiro Saito	Ben Phillips
Übel	Ikumi Hasegawa	Morgan Berry
Wirbel	Kishō Taniyama	Ricco Fajardo
Methode	Reina Ueda	Caitlin Glass
Kanne	Azumi Waki	Madeleine Morris
Lawine	Sayumi Suzushiro	Rebecca Danae
Land	Shohei Komatsu	Corey Wilder
Edel	Tomoyo Kurosawa	Nia Celeste
Richter	Eiji Hanawa	Ian Moore
Laufen	Shizuka Ishigami	Marisa Duran
Ehre	Kanae Itō	Trina Nishimura
Serie	Mariya Ise	Anastasia Muñoz
Lernen	Atsushi Miyauchi	Kent Williams
Genau	Tarusuke Shingaki	Aaron Roberts
Sense	Haruka Terui	Lindsay Seidel
Falsch	Kento Shiraishi	Dio Garner
Flamme	Atsuko Tanaka	Lydia Mackay
Aura	Ayana Taketatsu	Corey Pettit
Lügner	Junichi Suwabe	Blake McNamara
Linie	Manaka Iwami	Dani Chambers
Revolte	Shin-ichiro Miki	Jonah Scott
Kraft	Takehito Koyasu	Orion Pitts

== Production and release ==
In September 2022, it was announced that the manga series would receive an anime adaptation. It was later announced that it would be a television series produced by Madhouse and directed by Keiichirō Saitō, with script supervision by Tomohiro Suzuki and character designs by Reiko Nagasawa. The two consecutive-cours first season premiered with a two-hour special consisting of the first four episodes on September 29, 2023, on Nippon TV's programming block Kin'yō Road Show, which is normally reserved for feature films, becoming the first anime series to do so. Later episodes debuted on the new block Friday Anime Night on the same network and its affiliates, and ended on March 22, 2024. Toho Animation compiled the episodes into seven Blu-ray and DVD sets, which were released from January 24 to July 17, 2024.

In September 2024, it was announced the series was renewed for a second season. It aired from January 16 to March 27, 2026. The staff and cast from the first season are reprising their roles, with Tomoya Kitagawa replacing Keiichirō Saitō as the season's director. Daiki Harashina serves as the assistant director, while Takasemaru, Keisuke Kojima, and Yuri Fujinaka replace Nagasawa as character designers.

A third season, covering the "Golden Land" arc, was announced after the airing of the final episode of the second season. It is set to premiere in October 2027.

Eleven short episodes, titled Frieren: Beyond Journey's End – Spell That Does OOO (Note: English title per Crunchyroll, LLC's home media releases.) (葬送のフリーレン ～●●(まるまる)の魔法～, Sōsō no Frieren: Marumaru no Mahō), were released on Toho Animation's YouTube channel and on Frieren's official anime X and TikTok accounts from October 11, 2023, to March 24, 2024. A second six-episode season was released from April 2 to September 3, 2025. A third five-episode season was released from January 19 to March 26, 2026.

=== English release ===
Crunchyroll licensed the series for streaming outside East Asia, and an English dub directed by Jad Saxton premiered on its streaming platform on October 13, 2023. The company released the series on DVD and Blu-ray sets; the first part, which includes the first 16 episodes, was released on December 17, 2024, while the second part was released on September 23, 2025. Muse Communication licensed the series in Southeast Asia.

== Music ==
The music for the series is composed by Evan Call. An original soundtrack album was released on April 17, 2024. For the four-episode premiere broadcast only, the special ending theme song is "Bliss", performed by Milet. The first opening theme song is "Yūsha" (勇者; lit. 'Hero'), performed by Yoasobi, while the ending theme song is "Anytime Anywhere", performed by Milet. The second opening theme song is "Sunny" (晴る, Haru), performed by Yorushika, while the second ending theme song includes a different section of "Anytime Anywhere". For the second season, the opening theme song is "Lulu.", performed by Mrs. Green Apple, while the ending theme song is "The Story of Us", performed by Milet.

=== Concerts ===
On December 1, 2025, Live Nation announced an orchestral event titled Frieren: Beyond Journey’s End Orchestra Concert, featuring the series' soundtrack, to be held on May 21, 2026, at the OVO Arena in London. On June 2 of that year, the Frieren: Beyond Journey's End* Film Concert was announced —accompanied by a promotional image— featuring a two-performance concert where songs from the first and second seasons would be performed. It took place at the Yokohama National Grand Hall in Kanagawa on August 1, 2026, and at the Grand Cube Osaka Main Hall on September 19. It was also scheduled to be held at Carnegie Hall in New York on October 4.

== Reception ==
=== Critical reception ===
The anime adaptation has received critical acclaim. On review aggregator website Rotten Tomatoes, the first season of Frieren: Beyond Journey's End holds an approval rating of 100% based on seven reviews, with an average rating of 8.8/10. Since the start of 2024, Frieren has been the top-rated anime on MyAnimeList and Anime News Network. Digital Spy's Ali Griffiths praised it as one of the best fantasy anime of 2023, citing its themes surrounding the passage of time as well as praising the show's "cozy, calm atmosphere" and sound design. Richard Eisenbeis of Anime News Network praised the dynamics between the main characters as Frieren's character and backstory develop. Jenni Lada of Siliconera considered it one of the best anime of late 2023, praising Frieren's depth as she seeks to reconnect with Himmel following his death in the first episode, while also noting other events in the manga transition from drama to slice-of-life.

Dan Mansfield of The Fandom Post praised the anime's fights and narrative, but felt some sexual jokes were out-of-place despite appreciating the humor overall. While commenting on Frieren's personality, Mansfield appreciated scenes in early episodes in which Fern comforts Stark, who is worried about being scared. Kambole Campbell of IGN praised the production values and the show's "simple but moving" narrative. Cy Catwell of Anime Feminist enjoyed the soundtrack, comparing it to the music of The Legend of Zelda: Breath of the Wild and Tears of the Kingdom, and praised Madhouse's animation. Ayaan Paul Chowdhury of The Hindu called it "the future of fantasy" and wrote: "Frieren: Beyond Journey's End dares to carve its own path amidst the cacophony of familiar tropes and archetypes".

=== Awards and nominations ===
Year	Award	Category	Recipient	Result	Ref.
2023	Yahoo! Japan Search Awards	Anime Category	Frieren: Beyond Journey's End	4th place	
2023	Asian Pop Music Awards	Best OST	"Yūsha" by Yoasobi	Nominated	
2023	Asian Pop Music Awards	Best Lyricist	Milet for "Anytime Anywhere"	Nominated	
2024	Tokyo Anime Award Festival	Best Music	Yoasobi	Won	
2024	Japan Character Awards	New Face Award	Frieren: Beyond Journey's End	Won	
2024	29th Shanghai Television Festival	Best Animation	Frieren: Beyond Journey's End	Nominated	
2024	29th Shanghai Television Festival	Best Storytelling	Frieren: Beyond Journey's End	Nominated	
2024	46th Anime Grand Prix	Grand Prix	Frieren: Beyond Journey's End	4th place	
2024	46th Anime Grand Prix	Best Character	Frieren	7th place	
2024	46th Anime Grand Prix	Best Theme Song	"Yūsha" by Yoasobi	6th place	
2024	46th Anime Grand Prix	Best Theme Song	"Anytime Anywhere" by Milet	9th place	
2024	46th Anime Grand Prix	Best Theme Song	"Sunny" by Yorushika	10th place	
2024	46th Anime Grand Prix	Best Voice Actor	Atsumi Tanezaki	Won	
2024	Japan Expo Awards	Daruma for Best Anime	Frieren: Beyond Journey's End	Won	
2024	Japan Expo Awards	Daruma for Best Slice of Life Anime	Frieren: Beyond Journey's End	Won	
2024	Japan Expo Awards	Daruma for Best Ending	"Anytime Anywhere" by Milet	Won	
2024	19th AnimaniA Awards	Best TV Series: Online	Frieren: Beyond Journey's End	Nominated	
2024	19th AnimaniA Awards	Best Anime Song	"Yūsha" by Yoasobi	Nominated	
2024	14th Newtype Anime Awards	Best Character (Female)	Frieren	Won	
2024	14th Newtype Anime Awards	Best Character Design	Reiko Nagasawa	Won	
2024	14th Newtype Anime Awards	Best Screenplay	Tomohiro Suzuki	Won	
2024	Anime Buzzword Awards	Bronze Prize	Himmel theory / Himmel syntax, "It's what Himmel the hero would have done"	Won	
2024	4th Astra TV Awards	Best Anime Series	Frieren: Beyond Journey's End	Nominated	
2025	7th Global Demand Awards	Most In-Demand Anime Series of 2024	Frieren: Beyond Journey's End	Nominated	
2025	Tokyo Anime Award Festival	Animation of the Year (Television)	Frieren: Beyond Journey's End	Won	
2025	Tokyo Anime Award Festival	Best Music	Evan Call	Won	
2025	2025 Music Awards Japan	Best of Listeners' Choice: Japanese Song	"Sunny" by Yorushika	Nominated	
2025	9th Crunchyroll Anime Awards	Anime of the Year	Frieren: Beyond Journey's End	Nominated	
2025	9th Crunchyroll Anime Awards	Best New Series	Frieren: Beyond Journey's End	Nominated	
2025	9th Crunchyroll Anime Awards	Best Drama	Frieren: Beyond Journey's End	Won	
2025	9th Crunchyroll Anime Awards	Best Animation	Frieren: Beyond Journey's End	Nominated	
2025	9th Crunchyroll Anime Awards	Best Background Art	Frieren: Beyond Journey's End	Won	
2025	9th Crunchyroll Anime Awards	Best Character Design	Reiko Nagasawa	Nominated	
2025	9th Crunchyroll Anime Awards	Best Director	Keiichirō Saitō	Won	
2025	9th Crunchyroll Anime Awards	Best Main Character	Frieren	Nominated	
2025	9th Crunchyroll Anime Awards	Best Supporting Character	Fern	Won	
2025	9th Crunchyroll Anime Awards	Best Supporting Character	Himmel	Nominated	
2025	9th Crunchyroll Anime Awards	"Must Protect at All Costs" Character	Frieren	Nominated	
2025	9th Crunchyroll Anime Awards	Best Anime Song	"The Brave" by Yoasobi	Nominated	
2025	9th Crunchyroll Anime Awards	Best Score	Evan Call	Nominated	
2025	9th Crunchyroll Anime Awards	Best VA Performance (Japanese)	Atsumi Tanezaki as Frieren	Nominated	
2025	9th Crunchyroll Anime Awards	Best VA Performance (English)	Mallorie Rodak as Frieren	Nominated	
2025	9th Crunchyroll Anime Awards	Best VA Performance (Castilian)	Sandra Villa as Frieren	Nominated	
2025	9th Crunchyroll Anime Awards	Best VA Performance (French)	Marie Nonnenmacher as Frieren	Nominated	
2025	9th Crunchyroll Anime Awards	Best VA Performance (Hindi)	Natasha John as Frieren	Nominated	
2025	9th Crunchyroll Anime Awards	Best VA Performance (Italian)	Martina Felli as Frieren	Nominated	
2025	9th Crunchyroll Anime Awards	Best VA Performance (Spanish)	Erika Ugalde as Frieren	Nominated	
2025	20th AnimaniA Awards	Best Anime Song	"Sunny" by Yorushika	Nominated	
2026	48th Anime Grand Prix	Grand Prix	Frieren: Beyond Journey's End Season 2	5th place	
2026	48th Anime Grand Prix	Best Character	Frieren	5th place	
2026	48th Anime Grand Prix	Best Theme Song	"Lulu." by Mrs. Green Apple	8th place	
2026	48th Anime Grand Prix	Best Voice Actor	Atsumi Tanezaki	4th place	
2026	21st AnimaniA Awards	Best TV / Movie: Disc Release	Frieren: Beyond Journey's End	Nominated	
2026	16th Newtype Anime Awards	Best Work (TV/Streaming)	Frieren: Beyond Journey's End Season 2	2nd place	
2026	16th Newtype Anime Awards	Best Theme Song	"Lulu." by Mrs. Green Apple	4th place	
2026	16th Newtype Anime Awards	Best Soundtrack	Evan Call	3rd place	
2026	16th Newtype Anime Awards	Best Director	Tomoya Kitagawa	2nd place	
2026	16th Newtype Anime Awards	Best Character Design	Takasemaru, Keisuke Kojima, and Yuri Fujinaka	2nd place	
2026	16th Newtype Anime Awards	Best Screenplay	Tomohiro Suzuki	Won	
2026	16th Newtype Anime Awards	Best Studio	Madhouse	2nd place	
2026	MTV Video Music Awards Japan	Video of the Year	"Lulu." by Mrs. Green Apple	Nominated	
2026	MTV Video Music Awards Japan	Best Alternative Video	"Lulu." by Mrs. Green Apple	Won	
2026	32nd Manga Barcelona Awards	Best Anime Series Premiere	Frieren: Beyond Journey's End Season 2	Pending	
2026	32nd Manga Barcelona Awards	Best anime series or movie in physical format (BR / DVD)	Frieren: Beyond Journey's End– Collector's Edition	Pending	
