= Frieren =

Japanese manga series and its adaptation(s)

- Frieren: Beyond Journey's End
- First tankōbon volume cover, featuring (from left to right) Heiter, Frieren, Himmel, and Eisen

葬送のフリーレン (Sōsō no Furīren)
- Genre: Adventure; Drama; Fantasy
- Manga
- Written by: Kanehito Yamada
- Illustrated by: Tsukasa Abe
- Published by: Shogakukan
- English publisher: NA: Viz Media; SEA: Shogakukan Asia (Note: As Frieren: Remnants of the Departed)
- Imprint: Shōnen Sunday Comics
- Magazine: Weekly Shōnen Sunday
- Original run: April 28, 2020 – present
- Volumes: 15
- Anime television series
- Frieren: Beyond Journey's End (2023–)
- icon

Frieren: Beyond Journey's End (Japanese: 葬送のフリーレン, Hepburn: Sōsō no Furīren; lit. 'Frieren at the Funeral' or 'Frieren the Slayer' (Note: The Japanese characters 葬 (sō; lit. 'funeral' or 'bury') and 送 (sō; lit. 'to send' or 'escort' or 'to see someone off') read together as 'attending a funeral', but can also be read in kun'yomi; 葬 (hōmuru; lit. 'to bury' or 'to consign to oblivion') and 送 (okuru; lit. 'to send' or 'to dispatch' or 'to take (somebody somewhere)'), together with のフリーレン (no Furiren), as 'Frieren the Slayer'. Additionally, the seventeenth chapter of the manga, which bears the same title as the series, was translated to English by Viz Media as "Frieren the Slayer", and by Shogakukan Asia as "Frieren the Reaper".)) is a Japanese manga series written by Kanehito Yamada and illustrated by Tsukasa Abe. It has been serialized in Shogakukan's shōnen manga magazine Weekly Shōnen Sunday since April 2020; its chapters have been collected in 15 tankōbon volumes as of December 2025. It is licensed for English release in North America by Viz Media and in Southeast Asia by Shogakukan Asia. The series takes place in a fantasy world and follows Frieren, an elven mage on a journey to the resting place of souls to reunite with her former comrade Himmel, whose Hero Party slew the Demon King.

Madhouse produced an anime television series adaptation, with its first season airing from September 2023 to March 2024. A second season aired from January to March 2026. A third season is set to premiere in October 2027.

By January 2026, the Frieren: Beyond Journey's End manga had over 35 million copies in circulation. The manga won the 14th Manga Taishō and the 25th annual Tezuka Osamu Cultural Prize's New Creator Prize in 2021, and the 69th Shogakukan Manga Award and the 48th Kodansha Manga Award (in the shōnen category) in 2024.

== Plot ==
The elven mage Frieren is a former member of a party of adventurers who defeated the Demon King and restored harmony to the world after a ten-year quest. The party also consists of the human hero Himmel, the dwarven warrior Eisen, and the human priest Heiter. Before they part, they observe the Era Meteors, a meteor shower that occurs once every fifty years. Even though she knows that humans like Himmel have shorter lifespans than elves like herself or dwarves like Eisen, Frieren agrees to see the group again for the next occurrence of the Era Meteors. Afterwards, Frieren departs and travels the world in pursuit of magical knowledge.

Fifty years later, Frieren returns to the capital to find humanity has changed and her former companions have aged. After one last adventure to see the meteor shower, Himmel dies of old age. During his funeral, Frieren expresses guilt for not attempting to learn more about him. She visits her other former comrades, and accepts Heiter's request to teach and care for Fern, an orphaned child he had adopted. She also receives an invitation to travel north to the resting place of souls to see Himmel again, express her feelings and bid him farewell. Frieren travels with Fern while still learning magic. Along the way, she is joined by Stark, a young warrior boy Eisen had taught.

Frieren's elven nature grants her an extremely long lifespan, causing her to experience years or decades as ephemeral. With this perception of time, Frieren considers the ten-year adventure with Himmel's party a fleeting experience. Despite this, the impact of her relationships with her companions and how they have shaped her outlook on life is often revisited through periodic flashbacks.

== Production ==
Katsuma Ogura, the editor-in-chief of Frieren: Beyond Journey's End, noted Yamada's previous work Bocchi Hakase to Robot Shōjo no Zetsubō Teki Utopia did not sell well, but Ogura considered it a masterpiece. This led to a suggestion to give Yamada an illustrator for his next manga. They had several ideas, including a gag manga, which resulted in storyboards for a one-shot of Frieren. Upon reading the storyboards, Ogura started laughing, saying it was not a comedy at all. When Yamada finished the first storyboard, Ogura contacted Tsukasa Abe, and asked him to draw a character chart and send the work to the editorial department. Yamada was impressed, and submitted the project to the editorial department after Ogura asked him to do it. Ogura was pleased with Abe's artwork and suggested he work with Yamada. Yamada approved of the first illustration of protagonist Frieren, believing that she had an aura of humanity.

During an editorial department meeting, the editor in charge said: "If we decide on a good title, we will pay a prize of 10,000 yen out of our own pocket". One of the title ideas submitted by the deputy editor-in-chief was Sōsō no Frieren, and Yamada and Abe decided to use it for the manga.

Frieren: Beyond Journey's End began serialization in Shogakukan's shōnen manga magazine Weekly Shōnen Sunday on April 28, 2020. In January 2023, it was announced the manga would go on hiatus; it resumed in March of that same year. It went on another hiatus in May 2024 and resumed in August; it went on hiatus again in December of the same year. The series resumed on July 23, 2025; however, in October of the same year, it was announced that the manga would enter indefinite hiatus. The announcement noted that the hiatus is for Yamada and Abe to focus on their health, adding that it came after discussions between the creators and the magazine's editorial staff about adjusting the serialization pace of the manga.

== Media ==
=== Manga ===
Written by Kanehito Yamada and illustrated by Tsukasa Abe, Frieren: Beyond Journey's End debuted in Shogakukan's shōnen manga magazine Weekly Shōnen Sunday on April 28, 2020. Shogakukan has collected its chapters into individual tankōbon volumes, the first of which was published on August 18, 2020. As of December 18, 2025, 15 volumes have been released.

In February 2021, Viz Media announced it had licensed the series for English release in North America, and the first volume was published on November 9, 2021. On May 9, 2023, Viz Media launched its Viz Manga digital distribution service, where the series' chapters are published simultaneously with their release in Japan. In Southeast Asia, the manga has been licensed by Shogakukan's subsidiary, Shogakukan Asia, under the title Frieren: Remnants of the Departed.

==== Spin-offs ====
Five one-shot spin-off chapters by different authors were published on the Sunday Webry manga website from May 22 to 26, 2023; Frieren in the Kitchen (厨房のフリーレン, Chūbō no Furīren) by Kassan (May 22); The Adventures of the Hero Himmel (勇者ヒンメルの冒険譚, Yūsha Hinmeru no Bōkentan) by Ren Miura (May 23); Frieren Wants to Learn About Humans (フリーレンは人間を知りたい, Furīren wa Ningen wo Shiritai) by Jona (May 24); Himmel's Travel Log (ヒンメル旅にっき, Hinmeru Tabi Nikki) by Kazumi Yamaguchi (May 25); and Frieren Makes a Detour (寄り道のフリーレン, Yorimichi no Furīren) by Sōichi Igarashi (May 26). The chapters were later collected in a single volume, titled Frieren: The Anthology – Journeys off the Beaten Path (葬送のフリーレン アンソロジー～異なる旅を楽しむ魔法～, Sōsō no Furīren Ansoroji Kotonaru Tabi o Tanoshimu Mahō), released on December 18, 2023. Shogakukan Asia published the volume in English in Southeast Asia in September 2024.

=== Anime ===
A 28-episode anime television series adaptation, produced by Madhouse and directed by Keiichirō Saitō, premiered with a two-hour special on September 29, 2023, on Nippon TV's film programming block Kin'yō Road Show. Later episodes debuted on the new block Friday Anime Night on the same network and its affiliates, and ended on March 22, 2024. A second season, directed by Tomoya Kitagawa, broadcast from January 16 to March 27, 2026. A third season, covering the "Golden Land" arc, is set to premiere in October 2027.

Eleven short episodes, titled Frieren: Beyond Journey's End – Spell That Does OOO (Note: English title per Crunchyroll, LLC's home media releases.) (葬送のフリーレン ～●●(まるまる)の魔法～, Sōsō no Frieren: Marumaru no Mahō), were released on Toho Animation's YouTube channel, and on X and TikTok by the anime's official accounts from October 11, 2023, to March 24, 2024. A second six-episode season was released from April 2 to September 3, 2025. A third five-episode season was released from January 19 to March 26, 2026.

=== Other media ===
Shogakukan published an official fanbook that features information about the series, illustrations, summaries, and initial rough character designs, on January 12, 2024.

A prequel novel, Frieren: Beyond Journey's End -Prelude- (小説 葬送のフリーレン～前奏～, Shōsetsu Sōsō no Furīren Zensō; lit. 'Frieren at the Funeral: The Novel – Prelude'), written by Mei Hachimoku with supervision by Yamada, was released on April 17, 2024. The novel includes five original short stories centered around Frieren, Fern, Stark, Kanne, Lawine, and Aura. In August 2025, Yen Press announced that it had licensed the novel and was released on March 24, 2026.

A 24-page novella, also written by Hachimoku, subtitled Sora ni Hana wo Sakaseru Mahō (空に花を咲かせる魔法; lit. 'Magic to Make Flowers Bloom in the Sky'), was bundled with the special edition of the manga's fourteenth volume, released on March 18, 2025.

In April 2024, Scrap's Real Escape Game announced the creation of an escape room based on the manga, titled "Escape from the Millennium Dream".

== Reception ==
=== Sales ===
By March 2021, over two million copies of the manga were in circulation, which steadily increased in the following years. By January 2026, it had over 35 million copies in circulation. the 12th volume was Shogakukan's second-highest first-print-run manga volume of 2023–2024 (period from April 2023 to March 2024), with 600,000 copies printed; the 14th volume was the publisher's highest first-print-run manga volume of 2024–2025 (period from April 2024 to March 2025), with 700,000 copies printed; volumes 12 and 13 were the fifth and ninth best-selling manga volumes of the first half of 2024, with sales of 637,022 units and 509,573 copies, respectively; the 14th volume was the seventh best-selling manga volume of the first half of 2025, with 521,551 copies sold; the 15th volume was the third best-selling manga volume of the first half of 2026, with 521,551 copies sold.

The 15th volume appeared in several rankings introduced by Billboard Japan for 2026—which take into account physical and digital sales, as well as library loans and social media popularity. It reached sixth place on the Hot Manga chart, which ranks the top manga of the year. It ranked eighth on the Hot Shot Books chart, which tracks books experiencing the most significant commercial growth and rising popularity. It placed eighteenth on the Reiwa Books ranking, which ranks the best books published during the Reiwa Era. It ranked twenty-first on the Book Hot 100, which lists the top 100 best-selling books of the year. To achieve these rankings, the volume placed fifth in the physical retail category, fourth in the e-books section, and sixth in terms of social media presence.

The manga ranked second on Takarajimasha's Kono Manga ga Sugoi! list of best manga of 2021 for male readers; it ranked sixth on the 2022 list; and twelfth on the 2025 list. The series ranked second on the "Nationwide Bookstore Employees' Recommended Comics of 2021" by the website "Honya Club". The series ranked seventeenth on the 2021 "Book of the Year" list by Da Vinci magazine; it ranked tenth on the 2022 list; twelfth on the 2023 list; and ninth on the 2024 list.

Frieren: Beyond Journey's End was ranked in the top-ten graphic novels by the American Library Association's Graphic Novels and Comics Round Table's 2022 list of "Best Graphic Novels for Adults". Its volumes were ranked on Circana (formerly NPD) BookScan's monthly top 20 adult graphic novels list since February 2025.

=== Critical reception ===
Rebecca Silverman of Anime News Network gave the first volume of Frieren: Beyond Journey's End an A−. Silverman praised the concept of Frieren outliving her companions, and being forced to live with an understanding of the human world and her own emotions, calling it an "interesting take on the fantasy genre", but said the art is not "quite up to the emotional tasks of the story". Richard Eisenbeis from the same website praised the second volume of the series, saying it "delivers both emotional tales and deep thematic explorations of human nature". He described the third and fourth volumes of the manga as "an action climax that delivers not only a grand battle but also character-development and world-building. Smaller one-off tales that hit you right in your emotional core." Ross Locksley of UK Anime Network considered it as an interesting take on the fantasy genre by contrasting the enduring existence of one race with the ephemeral lifespan of another, finding it similar to the manga series To Your Eternity, highlighting how the series explores the relationships Frieren builds with the people around her.

Wolfen Moondaughter of Sequential Tart rated the first volume 9 out of 10. Moondaughter highlighted the story's slice of life nature, despite its premise, which involves a "[Dungeons & Dragons]-style adventuring party", and praised the interaction between the characters and the artwork, concluding: "If you want a break from fight scenes, and want something more serene and contemplative, this book should serve you well! It's also a lovely story of honouring the memory of lost loved ones, and dealing with grief". Sheena McNeil of the same website gave the first volume a 7 and called the concept of "what happens to the party when the quest is over?" interesting. She praised Frieren's struggle to become less detached and seeing her experience the "lovely poignant moments, bittersweet ones, and happy ones". McNeil also compared the series' pace and feel to those of Haibane Renmei. Antonio Mireles of The Fandom Post named it the sixth-best manga of 2021 and wrote: "Time waits for no man and that line may be overused but that line strikes a chord in this manga. There is always more to discover and Frieren has to learn that lesson as time marches on. It's a sweet but harsh reminder to enjoy the moment for all its worth." Kara Dennison of Otaku USA praised the art and the touches of humanity that helped the narrative have appeal, comparing it with Lord of the Rings and other fantasy series. Gracie Qiu of Anime Trending gave it a score of 94.5 out of 100, writing: "Through its characters, its themes, and its astounding execution of the nuanced story, I end each episode looking at my own life, appreciating the journey I have traveled and wondering in anticipation at what is still yet to come."

=== Awards and nominations ===
Year	Award	Category	Result	Ref.
2021	14th Manga Taishō	Grand Prize	Won	
2021	25th Tezuka Osamu Cultural Prize	New Creator Prize	Won	
2021	eBook Initiative Japan Manga Award	Grand Prize	2nd place	
2021	45th Kodansha Manga Award	Best Shōnen Manga	Nominated	
2021	5th Tsutaya Comic Awards	Next Hit	5th place	
2021	7th Next Manga Award	Print Manga Category	3rd place	
2022	46th Kodansha Manga Award	Best Shōnen Manga	Nominated	
2023	Rakuten Kobo's E-book Manga Award	I Want to Deliver It to the World! Top Recommended Manga	Won	
2023	69th Shogakukan Manga Award	— (Note: For the first time, the nominees were not divided into categories for the 2023 Shogakukan Manga Award. From this year on, the categories have been discontinued.)	Won	
2024	48th Kodansha Manga Award	Best Shōnen Manga	Won	
2024	36th Harvey Awards	Best Manga	Nominated	
2024	30th Manga Barcelona Awards	Best Shōnen	Won	
