= Mallorie Rodak =

American voice actress

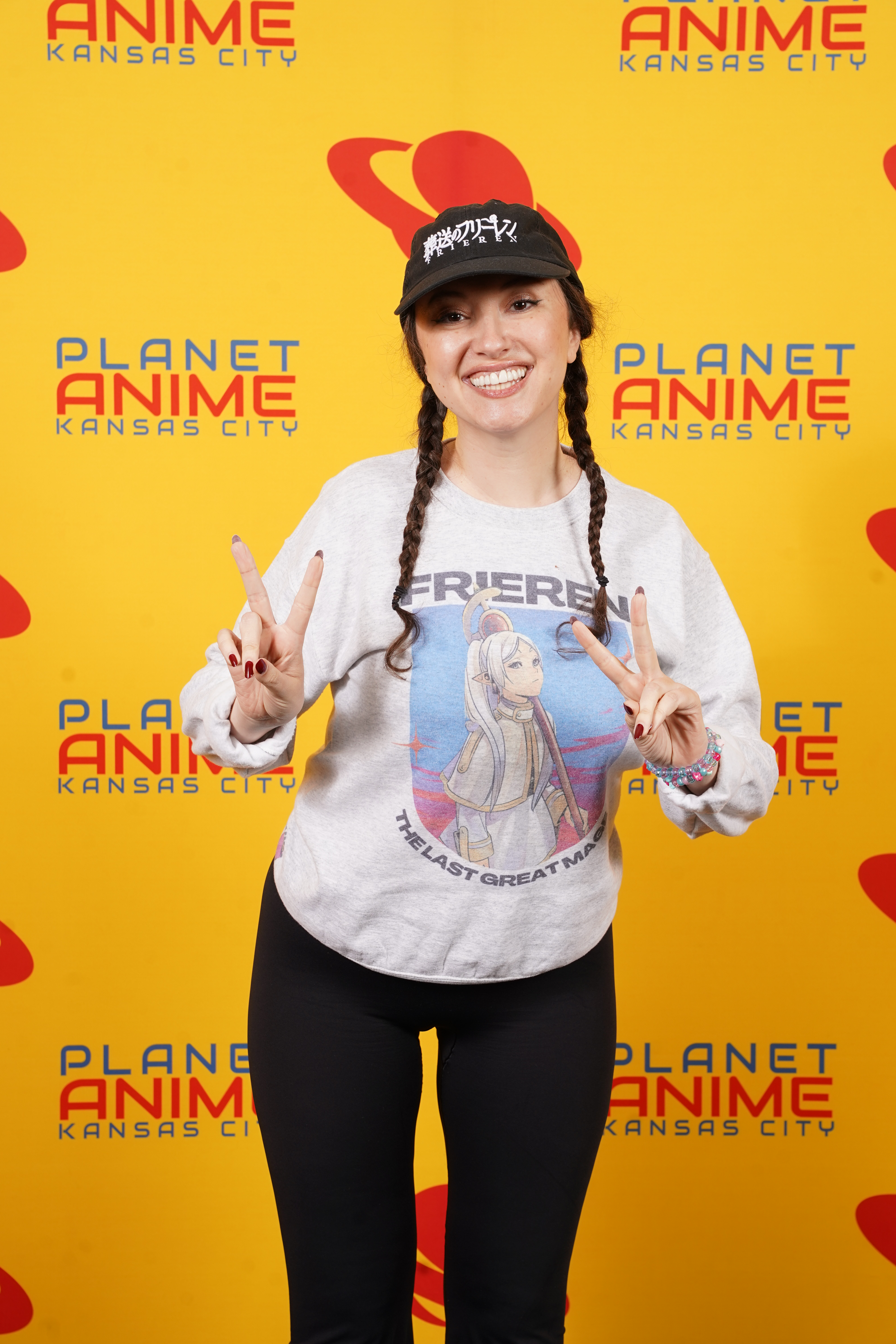
- Rodak in 2025
- Occupation: Voice actress
- Years active: 2014–present
- Website: www.mallorierodak.com

Mallorie Rodak is an American voice actress, known for her work on English dubs of anime. She is known for providing the English voice of Frieren in the anime series Frieren: Beyond Journey's End, as well as for roles including Great Sage and Raphael in That Time I Got Reincarnated as a Slime, Yukino Aguria in Fairy Tail, High Elf Archer in Goblin Slayer, and Elinalise Dragonroad in Mushoku Tensei: Jobless Reincarnation.

== Biography ==
Rodak trained her voice by singing, participating in musical theater, choir, and opera from the fourth grade through college. In college, she pursued theater training. Rodak got her start in voice acting for commercials, but it was four years after cold-emailing Funimation requesting background voice opportunities that she got her first anime audition with the company. Rodak had given up hope, but her name had remained on a list.

Rodak began working as an anime voice actress in 2014, when she voiced Orsola Aquinas in the English dub of A Certain Magical Index II. That year, she was nominated for the Breakthrough Voice Actress of the Year award by Behind the Voice Actors.

Rodak went on to voice characters in anime series including Fairy Tail, Overlord, Black Clover, One Piece, and My Hero Academia.

Frieren: Beyond Journey’s End

In 2023, Rodak was cast as Frieren in the English dub of Frieren: Beyond Journey's End.

In 2025, Rodak was nominated in the category of Best Voice Artist Performance (English) for her role as Frieren in Frieren: Beyond Journey's End. The series received substantial critical attention and was included on several publications' lists of the best anime of 2024. Rodak's performance as Frieren has also received critical attention. Anime News Network praised the English-language release of the series, including Rodak's performance as the title character.

She has expressed love and appreciation for the series and the character’s complexity. Her association with the character has also extended into the series' fan community. In late 2025, Rodak adopted a fan drawing of Frieren looking up as her social-media profile image. The drawing subsequently received wider attention, and GamesRadar+ interviewed Rodak about the phenomenon in March 2026. The original artist, u/SpaceDev1, later thanked Rodak for her support.

Rodak has also appeared at anime and pop-culture conventions as a guest, including MCM London, Calgary Expo, and Anime Expo.

== Filmography ==
=== Animated series ===
List of voice performances in animated series
| Year | Title | Role | Notes | Ref. |
|---|---|---|---|---|
| 2014 | A Certain Magical Index | Orsola Aquinas | Season 2-3 | |
| 2015 | Heavy Object | Shikibu | | |
| 2015 | Shomin Sample | Miyuki Kujō | | |
| 2015 | Fairy Tail | Yukino Aguria | | |
| 2015 | Shomin Sample | Miyuki Kujō | | |
| 2016 | Tokyo ESP | Minami | | |
| 2016 | And You Thought There Is Never a Girl Online? | Kyoh | | |
| 2016 | Love Live! Sunshine!! | Prelude | | |
| 2016 | Izetta: The Last Witch | Princess Finé | | |
| 2016 | Keijo | Asuka Iori | | |
| 2017 | Kantai Collection | Mamiya | | |
| 2017 | A Centaur's Life | Shima | | |
| 2017 | Black Clover | Nebra Silva | | |
| 2017 | Star Blazers: Space Battleship Yamato 2199 | Yuki Mori, Yurisha Iscandar | | |
| 2018 | Yamada-kun and the Seven Witches | Jun Inose | | |
| 2018 | Ace Attorney | Adrian Andrews | | |
| 2018 | Overlord | Solution Epsilon | | |
| 2018 | High School DxD | Rossweisse | Season 4 | |
| 2018 | Hanebado! | Yuika Shiwahime | | |
| 2018 | That Time I Got Reincarnated as a Slime | Great Sage / Raphael | Season 1-present | |
| 2018 | Goblin Slayer | High Elf Archer | Season 1-2 | |
| 2018 | Senran Kagura | Yumi | Season 2 | |
| 2018 | Hinomaru Sumo | Kuze’s Mom | | |
| 2018 | Ace Attorney | Andrews | Season 2 | |
| 2019 | One Piece | Enishida | Episode: One Piece 3D2Y: Overcoming Ace’s Death! Luffy's Pledge to His Friends | |
| 2019 | Magical Girl Spec-Ops Asuka | Queen | | |
| 2019 | My Roommate is a Cat | Teacher | | |
| 2019 | Mix | Mayumi | | |
| 2019 | Afterlost | Ryoko | | |
| 2019 | Wise Man's Grandchild | Melida (young) | | |
| 2019 | Sarazanmai | Kazuki's Biological Mother | | |
| 2019 | Hensuki | Sayuki | | |
| 2019 | Kochoki | Kaede | | |
| 2019 | Fire Force | Woman in Black | | |
| 2019 | Dr. Stone | Turquoise | | |
| 2019 | Arifureta | Yuuka Sonobe | | |
| 2019 | After School Dice Club | Takashi's Mother | | |
| 2019 | Special 7: Special Crime Investigation Unit | Sasaki | | |
| 2019 | Kemono Michi | Carmilla | | |
| 2020 | Super HxEros | Sora | | |
| 2020 | Higurashi When They Cry - Gou | Miyo Takano | Also Sotsu | |
| 2021 | Kuma Kuma Kuma Bear | Helen | Season 1-2 | |
| 2021 | Combatants Will Be Dispatched! | Astaroth | | |
| 2022 | Date A Live | Nia | Season 4 | |
| 2022 | Takt Op. Destiny | Jimmy's Mother | | |
| 2022 | The Slime Diaries | Great Sage | | |
| 2023 | The Ancient Magus' Bride | Sofia Healey | | |
| 2023 | My Tiny Senpai | Hayakawa | | |
| 2023 | Sacrificial Princess and the King of Beasts | Anastasia | | |
| 2023 | Frieren: Beyond Journey's End | Frieren | Season 1-present | |
| 2023 | Spy × Family | Olka Gretcher / Shaty Grey | Season 2 | |
| 2024 | Cherry Magic! Thirty Years of Virginity Can Make You a Wizard?! | Matsuura | | |
| 2024 | Fairy Tail: 100 Years Quest | Yukino Aguria | | |
| 2024 | Natsume's Book of Friends | Tsukiko | Season 6 | |
| 2025 | The Brilliant Healer's New Life in the Shadows | Zophia | | |
| 2025 | The Shiunji Family Children | Lala | | |
| 2025 | Clevatess | Naie Chiffonlitis | | |
| 2025 | Bogus Skill "Fruitmaster" | Holy Sister | | |
| 2026 | Daemons of the Shadow Realm | Break | | |
| 2027 | Clinic of Horrors | Bianca Abercrombie | | |

=== Films ===
- Goblin Slayer: Goblin's Crown (2020), High Elf Archer
- That Time I Got Reincarnated as a Slime the Movie: Scarlet Bond (2023), Raphael

=== Live action ===
- Ultraman Z (2023), Yoko Nakashima

=== Video games ===
- Borderlands 3 (2019), Josey, Rancher, Rose's Mother
