= Reiko Nagasawa =

Japanese animator

- 長澤 礼子
- Occupation: Animator
- Years active: 2013–present
- Notable work: Takt Op. Destiny; Frieren

Reiko Nagasawa (長澤 礼子, Nagasawa Reiko) is a Japanese animator. She has served as character designer for Takt Op. Destiny and Frieren.

== Biography ==
Nagasawa began her career as an animator in 2013, and she worked at Ace of Diamond (2019-2020) and Sonny Boy (2021) as an animation director. She worked at the 2021 anime Takt Op. Destiny as their character designer, as well as co-chief animation directors (alongside Toshiyuki Sugano).

Nagasawa served as character designer for the first season of the Frieren anime. She was nominated for the Crunchyroll Anime Award for Best Character Design at the 9th Crunchyroll Anime Awards, but lost to Naoyuki Onda of Dandadan, though she did win Best Character Design at the 14th Newtype Anime Awards. Her designs of the characters were inspired from the then-most recent chapters of the original manga. She also served as the chief animation director for that same season. She was replaced in her character designer position by Takasemaru, Keisuke Kojima, and Yuri Fujinaka – a trio of staff from that season – for season two.

Following her exit from Frieren, Nagasawa served as animation director for the opening scene of the 2024-2025 Orb: On the Movements of the Earth anime adaptation; kViN of SakugaBlog remarked that she and Toru Iwazawa (director and storyboarder of the series) were a "power couple" who could be interpreted as fans of the series based on "how much they were able to pack on the surface and below it". She will serve as character designer for the 2027 Akuyaku Reijō no Naka no Hito anime adaptation.

Nagasawa also uses her Twitter/X account to post her own fanmade illustrations; examples include her animation career's tenth anniversary and Oshi no Ko's Ai Hoshino, both from April 2023.

== Filmography ==
- Ace of Diamond (2019–2020; as animation director)
- Sonny Boy (2021; as animation director)
- Takt Op. Destiny (2021; as character designer and chief animation director)
- Frieren (2023–2024; as character designer and chief animation director)
- Akuyaku Reijō no Naka no Hito (2027; as character designer)
