= Stark (Frieren) =

Fictional character from Frieren

- Frieren: Beyond Journey's End character
- Stark as drawn by Tsukasa Abe
- First appearance: Frieren #11, "The Hero of the Village" (2020)
- Created by: Kanehito Yamada
- Designed by: Tsukasa Abe
- Voiced by: Japanese: Chiaki Kobayashi; English: Jordan Dash Cruz

Stark (Japanese: シュタルク, Hepburn: Shutaruku) is a character of the Japanese manga series Frieren: Beyond Journey's End, created by Kanehito Yamada and illustrated by Tsukasa Abe. The sole survivor from a race of warriors, Stark is an orphan raised by the dwarf Eisen to become a fighter and support the protagonist Frieren. Though Stark has no confidence on himself due to his lack of experience and fears, he shows a supernatural talent that allows him to save a town in his debut when being comforted by Frieren's pupil Fern. Since then Stark, decides to join Frieren and Fern's group, to find Heaven.

The character is voiced by Chiaki Kobayashi in Japanese and Jordan Dash Cruz in English. Critical response to the character has been generally positive for display of feats despite his cowardice which helps to give lessons to the reader. His fight scenes were also praised while his relationship with Fern attracted multiple response for the romantic overtones.

== Voice ==
In Japanese Stark is voiced by Chiaki Kobayashi. The voice actor was delighted about the positive response he got from the first anime and looked forward for the second season. Debuting in the fifth episode, Kobayashi struggled to bring a proper balance to his performance as Stark and asked for the director's help when doing the first part. Despite the character's issues in the first season, Kobayashi believed his constant misrelationship with Fern was improving and wanted to show that side when the second-season premieres through natural conversations and be more careful with Fern's feelings. He noted Stark has a tendency to admire older men whereas Fern sometimes feels like a mother.

Kobayashi believes that across the series' two animated seasons, Stark's fear and theme was consistent due to his needs of running away from a strong enemy regardless of all the training he does. However, he believes the character is different if he has to fight for the sake of Frieren and Fern found it charming that he has a notable human side. Fern's voice actor Kana Ichinose said that her character tends to be harsh at Stark but tries to keep it in a calm demeanor. Kobayashi compared the main to a family that constantly travel together with Frieren sometimes feeling like the child of the group.

For the English dub, Stark is voiced by Jordan Dash Cruz. Cruz looked forward seeing Stark in more action scenes due to the how well they are executed even if he is often a decoy. He often practised the yellings he has to make which often hurt his throat. Cruz said that, in retrospect, Stark felt more comical and human in the Mage Examination as he was not forced to fight every episode and instead spent time in a tavern from a city. Nevertheless, he found that the more time passes in the series, Stark feels like he is developing feelings for Fern. For the second season, Cruz and Fern's voice actress Jill Harris were surprised when an episode was devoted to their characters going on a date which was something they were looking forward. Cruz found the couple cute especially because Stark asked for Frieren's help when deciding what would appeal to Fern in the town. Finding Stark out of character, Cruz believes his character was better when admitting he asked for Frieren's help which gave the episode a better sense of conclusion as both Stark and Fern smiled together after such confession.

== Role in Frieren ==
Stark, one of Eisen's students who once defeated the dragon in a staring contest and now lives nearby. Stark admits he has never killed a monster before and only won the famous staring contest because he was frozen with fear. Frieren gives him until morning to decide to help. Fern encourages Stark by telling him all he needs is resolve. Stark reluctantly agrees to distract the dragon. However, Frieren points out that Eisen was always scared as well before a major battle. Stark then engages the dragon and manages to kill it without needing any assistance from Frieren and Fern. Frieren collects the grimoire and Stark agrees to accompany her on her journey. As the journey reaches his 18th birthday, Stark reveals that he is not used to getting presents because his warrior family never celebrated them, believing he was a failure to for being a coward, especially when he ran away when a monster attacked their village. Fern reassures him that she and Frieren will make sure he will not run away, and helps him buy a silver bracelet. Upon returning to the inn, Frieren reveals to Stark that, among Warrior cultures, a hamburg steak is given to those acknowledged as trying their hardest. This triggers a memory of his older brother Stoltz secretly cooking him hamburg steak on his birthday, as well as being the person telling Stark to flee the village so that he can live.

Fern and Stark have a falling out after Stark fails to get a birthday present for Fern. Fern tries to apologize to Stark, but he apologizes first, admitting that he wanted to pick Fern's present together with her but was too nervous to do so. As Stark buys a new bracelet for Fern, Sein notes that the design on both the bracelet and ring is the mirrored lotus, which in the language of flowers symbolizes "eternal love". Stark is embarrassed at buying something with such intimate connotations, but Fern does not mind. Following the Mage Exam, one of the participants Wirbel insists on trying to recruit Stark. Later, a concerned Fern reaches out to Stark, who tells her that he declined Wirbel's offer and that he loves his current role as party vanguard. He believes that working with Frieren and Fern has helped him grow as a person, and that there is no better place for him to be. Stark continues his journey where besides helping Frieren and Fern, he also starts fighting against menacing Mazoku.

== Reception ==
Stark's character was well received by fans and critics. In the AnimeCorner polls, Stark was voted as the best supporting character from 2024. Richard Eisenbeis from Anime News Network praised the introduction of Stark's character for exploring the importance of cowardice when the character manages to fight a dragon despite his fear and in anticlimatic fashion, he proves himself superior by killing the monster in one hit despite his fear. In "How Running Away Became Frieren: Beyond Journey's End's Most Powerful Skill", Daniel Dockery from Crunchyroll also approved the handling of Stark in the animated's second season when the writer decided to explore more the positive of his fear to the point there is no shame in that as the heroes that preceded him also took such tactics. This is also reinforced by how Frieren approves such tactic and casually smiles when agreeing to this plan. In "Frieren is the Show Slow Burning Romance Finally is Taking Shape", Fern and Stark's relationship has also been praised by Game Rant as it has been developing a romantic born as suggested by their friend Sein and the series gradually focuses on them even if it is slowly done. The backlash the praise Solo Leveling got over Frieren led Screen Rant write an article about how better is Frieren written than such action series, with Fern and Stark standing out as more notable sidecharacters than the ones seen in Solo Leveling due to the lessons they generally learn and allow them become more mature.

The character's action scenes against Mazoku in the anime's second season were also the subject of praise for the animation used to develop an appealing fight coreography similar to the recent series Sentenced to Be a Hero or Jujutsu Kaisen. Stark in particular got positive response as a result of the fighter taking as many hits as possible to create a weakpoint for the sake of defeating the enemy. The character's performance in fight also surprised Comic Book Resources who despite his simple appearance or gentle personality, hides an inhuman strength that allows him to defeat monsters with the second season giving him one fight against a nest of dragons he kills with assistance from Frieren and Fern.
