= Fern (Frieren) =

Fictional character from Frieren

- Frieren: Beyond Journey's End character
- Fern as drawn by Tsukasa Abe
- First appearance: Frieren #2, "The Priest's Lie" (2020)
- Created by: Kanehito Yamada
- Designed by: Tsukasa Abe
- Voiced by: Japanese: Kana Ichinose; English: Jill Harris

Fern (Japanese: フェルン, Hepburn: Ferun) is a character of the Japanese manga series Frieren: Beyond Journey's End, created by Kanehito Yamada and illustrated by Tsukasa Abe. A war orphan, Fern is adopted by the priest Heiter who wishes her to be raised by the protagonist Frieren in the future due to his decaying health. As Frieren takes into Fern, the child grows into an adult mage but is often portrayed as a stoic individual until warming up to both Frieren and her companion Stark, a young soldier also raised by one of Frieren's friends.

Fern is voiced by Kana Ichinose in Japanese and Jill Harris in English. Critical response to Fern's character has been generally positive for her growth as a mage and woman. Her relationship with Frieren and Stark has also been praised for the growing dynamic that makes the character more likable as the story progresses.

== Voice ==
In the animated adaptation of Frieren, Fern is voiced by Kana Ichinose in Japanese. Ichinose was amazed by the series' first season due to how the writers make it look it is written from Fern's perspective and could an engaging character arc. She liked how sometimes Fern's stories might feel like ordinary stories but are still appealing. Initially, the relationship Fern and Stark have problems getting along until the second season where Stark invites Fern to a date as a joke. However, Ichinose noted that relationship was appealing as the two character kept gradually getting along more the more they interacted to the point she remembered the character of Sein finds that the two had enough chemistry enough to yell "Just start dating already!" in a comical fashion. This is also helped by the fact that both Fern and Stark notably mature the more screentime they both have in the series according to Ichinose, making the relationship more appealing with every new episode especially during the second season of the anime.

Jill Harris voices Fern in English dub of the anime. Similar to Ichinose, Harris enjoyed the dynamic of Fern and Stark in fight scenes. She found Fern as a calm character who rarely raises her voice, making the actress try to voice her with confidence. When the second season was airing, both Harris and Stark's English voice actor Jordan Dash Cruz expressed excitement when the anime devoted an episode to the two characters going on a date, something which they have been looking forward to. Harris says it was a surprise to her, especially by the way the two interacted before the date began, with both actors finding them as an appealing couple.

== Role in Frieren ==
Fern is a war orphan from a southern country who lost her parents and was about to commit suicide by jumping off a ravine when the priest Heiter rescued her. After being raised by him, Fern meets Heiter's friend Frieren, who is asked by him to teach her magic so she could become a full-fledged mage. After Heiter's death, by which she has turned sixteen, she embarks on a journey as Frieren's apprentice. Though she initially treats Stark coldly, she eventually warms up to him as they bond, but still scolds him when he causes trouble. The two open up to each other on their respective 18th birthdays where they give each other items as presents. Their partner Sein suggests Stark's present means a declaration of love but Fern does not care when Stark claims he had no idea the meaning of his present.

On the journey to Heaven, Fern is convinced by Frieren to enter a Mage Examination. Fern feels uncertain that she could pass the exam, but Frieren lets her know that mana capacity is not everything and that she herself has lost eleven times to people with a lower mana capacity than herself. In the final exam, the elf Serie sees enormous potential in Fern and asks her to be her student, but Fern rejects the proposal. Unwilling to turn away such a promising mage, Serie relents and passes Fern. Fern asks for a spell to clean her clothes. Following the exam, the mage Wirbel insists on trying to recruit Stark for defending the Northern Plateau from the encroaching demon threat. A concerned Fern reaches out to Stark, who tells her that he declined Wirbel's offer and that he loves his current role as party vanguard. He believes that working with Frieren and Fern has helped him grow as a person, and that there is no better place for him to be.

== Reception ==
Critical response to Fern's character has been positive. In "How Old Is Fern in 'Frieren: Beyond Journey’s End'? Answered", The Mary Sue praised he growth specifically for improvements as a mage in the first season's Mage Examination where she is already an adult, making potential for stronger episodes with her new skills. The backlash the praise Solo Leveling got over Frieren led Screen Rant write an article about how better is Frieren written than such action series, with Fern and Stark standing out as more notable sidecharacters than the ones seen in Solo Leveling due to the lessons they generally learn and allow them become more mature. The character's action scenes against Mazoku in the anime's second season were also the subject of praise for the animation used to develop an appealing fight coreography similar to the recent fantasy series Sentenced to Be a Hero. Fern won the award for Best Supporting Character at the 9th Crunchyroll Anime Awards.

Fern was also praised for her interactions with Frieren and Stark. Rebecca Silverman of Anime News Network praised the introduction of Fern in the narrative for being one new companion who stays close to the protagonist following Himmel's death with the guardian wanting her to stay death to Frieren to avoid loneliness. As this happens, the relationship between Frieren and Fern is highly developed. N. Velasco-Quiroz wrote in "Anime TV Show Review: The Human Experience according to Frieren: Beyond Journey's End/Sōsō no Furīren" that Fern's relationship with Frieren well written as while Frieren teaches Fern magic, Frieren in turn is developed by Fern's growth and their bond. In the feature article, "Frieren: Beyond Journey's End is the Best Manga I Have Ever Read" Anime News Network compared Frieren and Fern's relationship to the one of a mother and daughter, respectively, with both being benefitted by their interactions that as the former is able to teach the latter the lessons Himmel taught her in her previous journey whereas Fern in instead looking forward to be live up to the expectations of the man who adopted her. In "Frieren is the Show Slow Burning Romance Finally is Taking Shape", Fern has also been praised by Game Rant for her relationship with Stark who are implied to developed a romantic born by their friend Sein and the series gradually focuses on them even if it is slowly done.
