= Keiichirō Saitō =

Japanese anime director

- 斎藤 圭一郎
- Born: January 18, 1993 (age 33)
- Occupations: director, key animator
- Years active: 2015-present
- Known for: Bocchi the Rock!; Frieren: Beyond Journey's End

Keiichirō Saitō (斎藤 圭一郎, Saitō Keiichirō; born on January 18, 1993) is a Japanese director and key animator, best known for directing the first season of both Bocchi the Rock! and Frieren: Beyond Journey's End.

== Career ==
In 2015, Keiichirō Saitō graduated from the Department of Animation in the Faculty of Manga at Kyoto Seika University. His graduation work, Itadaki no Saki (イタダキノサキ), received both the Excellence Award and the Production I.G Award at the 12th Kichijoji International Animation Film Festival.

In 2017, the aforementioned graduation work was nominated at the 15th Independent Animation Festival. Through this event, he met CloverWorks producer Shouta Umehara, leading him to work as an episode director for the studio and later being appointed as the director of Bocchi the Rock!.

In 2023, Saitō won the Best Director Award for Bocchi the Rock! at the 2023 Newtype Anime Awards. He also won the Best Director in 9th Crunchyroll Anime Awards for Frieren: Beyond Journey's End in 2025.

== Filmography ==
=== Television series ===
In "Director(s)" column highlights Saitō's directorial works.

Year	Title	Director(s)	Studio	Key Animation	Other roles	Ref(s)
2015	Absolute Duo	Atsushi Nakayama	Eight Bit	Yes		
2016	Love Live! Sunshine!!	Kazuo Sakai	Sunrise	No	In-between animation	
2016	DAYS	Kōnosuke Uda	MAPPA	Yes	Second key animation	
2016	Flip Flappers	Kiyotaka Oshiyama	Studio 3Hz	Yes		
2016	Occultic;Nine	Kyōhei Ishiguro	A-1 Pictures	Yes		
2016	Monster Hunter Stories: Ride On	Mitsuru Hongo	David Production	Yes	Storyboard, episode director	
2017	Little Witch Academia	Yoh Yoshinari	Trigger	Yes		
2017	ACCA: 13-Territory Inspection Dept.	Shingo Natsume	Madhouse	Yes		
2017	Gamers!	Manabu Okamoto	Pine Jam	Yes		
2017	The Idolmaster SideM	Miyuki Kuroki; Takahiro Harada	A-1 Pictures	Yes	Episode director, animation director, second key animation, in-between animation	
2018	Hozuki's Coolheadedness (season 2)	Kazuhiro Yoneda	Studio Deen	Yes		
2018	Encouragement of Climb	Yusuke Yamamoto	Eight Bit	Yes		
2019	Boogiepop and Others	Shingo Natsume	Madhouse	Yes	Storyboard, episode director, animation director	
2019	Pokémon the Series: Sun & Moon	Kunihiko Yuyama (chief); Daiki Tomiyasu	OLM	Yes		
2019	Ascendance of a Bookworm	Mitsuru Hongo	Ajia-do	Yes		
2020	Motto! Majime ni Fumajime Kaiketsu Zorori	Takahide Ogata	BN Pictures; Ajia-do	Yes		
2020	Strike Witches: Road to Berlin	Kazuhiro Takamura	David Production	Yes		
2021	Wonder Egg Priority	Shin Wakabayashi	CloverWorks	Yes		
2021	I've Been Killing Slimes for 300 Years and Maxed Out My Level	Nobukage Kimura	Revoroot	Yes		
2021	Sonny Boy	Shingo Natsume	Madhouse	Yes	Storyboard, episode director, animation director, second key animation	
2021	Takt Op. Destiny	Yūki Itō	MAPPA; Madhouse	Yes		
2022	Gunma-chan	Mitsuru Hongo	Ascension	Yes		
2022	The Heike Story	Naoko Yamada	Science Saru	Yes		
2022	Princess Connect! Re:Dive (season 2)	Takaomi Kanasaki (chief); Yasuo Iwamoto	CygamesPictures	Yes		
2022	The Executioner and Her Way of Life	Yoshiki Kawasaki	J.C.Staff	Yes		
2022	Bocchi the Rock!	Keiichirō Saitō	CloverWorks	Yes	Opening director, storyboard, episode director	
2022	Mob Psycho 100 III	Yuzuru Tachikawa (chief); Takahiro Hasui	Bones	Yes		
2022	Encouragement of Climb: Next Summit	Yusuke Yamamoto	Eight Bit	Yes	Storyboard, episode director	
2023	Oshi no Ko	Daisuke Hiramaki	Doga Kobo	Yes	Opening key animation	
2023	Frieren: Beyond Journey's End	Keiichirō Saitō	Madhouse	Yes		
2024	The Elusive Samurai	Yuta Yamazaki	CloverWorks	Yes	Second key animation	
2025	mono	Ryōta Aikei	Soigne	Yes		
2026	Frieren: Beyond Journey's End (season 2)	Tomoya Kitagawa	Madhouse	No	Director support	

=== Film ===
- Doraemon the Movie: Nobita's New Dinosaur (2020; key animation)
- Bocchi the Rock! Re: (2024; director)
- Bocchi the Rock! Re:Re: (2024; director)

=== OVA ===
- ACCA: 13-Territory Inspection Dept. - Regards (2020; director)

=== Original net animation (ONA) ===
- Reborn! × ēlDLIVE 24H – special collaboration mini anime (2016; in-between animation)
- Super Crooks (2021; key animation)
- Monogatari Series: Off & Monster Season (2024; opening key animation)
- Takopi's Original Sin (2025; key animation)

=== Other works ===
- Fate/Strange Fake (2019; commercial, key animation)
- Azur Lane – 3rd anniversary promotional video (2020; character design, animation director)
- Azur Lane × Venus Vacation Prism: Dead or Alive Xtreme – collaboration promotional animation (2020; animation director)
