= Frieren (character) =

Fictional character from Frieren

- Frieren: Beyond Journey's End character
- Frieren as drawn by Tsukasa Abe
- First appearance: Frieren #1, "The Journey's End" (2020)
- Created by: Kanehito Yamada
- Designed by: Tsukasa Abe
- Voiced by: Japanese: Atsumi Tanezaki; English: Mallorie Rodak

In-universe information
- Alias: The Slayer
- Race: Elf
- Gender: Female
- Occupation: Mage
- Affiliation: Party of Heroes (formerly); Frieren's Party
- Weapon: Magic staff

Frieren (Japanese: フリーレン, Hepburn: Furīren) (Note: From German; lit. 'be or feel cold; freeze') is the titular protagonist of the Japanese manga series Frieren: Beyond Journey's End, created by Kanehito Yamada and illustrated by Tsukasa Abe. Frieren is a former member of a party of adventurers led by the hero Himmel, who defeated the Demon King and restored harmony to the world after a ten-year quest. Reuniting with her former party fifty years later, Frieren discovers that her companions have distinctly aged, and Himmel dies of old age after one last adventure to see a meteor shower. During the funeral, Frieren expressed guilt for not attempting to learn more about him. Frieren then pays a visit to her other former comrades, and in the process takes on a human apprentice named Fern. She also receives an invitation to travel to the rumored resting place of souls in the far north, where she aims to see Himmel again, bid the hero a fitting farewell, and express her feelings. To fulfill those requests, Frieren embarks on a journey together with Fern while still pursuing her passion for learning magic.

While initially conceptualized as a comical fighter, Yamada scrapped multiple ideas she had for Frieren until deciding to make her an elf who grows in the story while remembering Himmel. In the anime adaptation, she is voiced by Atsumi Tanezaki in Japanese and Mallorie Rodak in English. Critical response to Frieren's character was mostly positive, due to how the series focuses on Frieren's view of life and how she aims to become a better person. The further exploration of her dark past was also praised for how it changed people's views of her.

== Creation ==
Series creator Kanehito Yamada originally envisioned Frieren as the protagonist of a comedy manga where she was obsessed with killing demons. In planning the series, editor Katsuma Ogura was impressed with Tsukasa Abe's artwork and suggested him to work with Yamada. Yamada was impressed with the first illustration of Frieren, believing the title character had an aura of humanity. When he asked him to draw a character picture for Frieren, Yamada said, "If this is the person, please do it." Abe was put in charge of the animation. After several revisions involving comedy, the author came across with the idea of having an elf with a long lifespan as the main character. Although Himmel dies, his appearances in flashbacks were written to reflect Frieren's emotional growth. When Himmel appears, the author feels that the story tightens up. Even if it is sad, there is a catharsis. For the animated adaptation by Madhouse, director Keiichiro Saito said that Fern appears to have several changes in the narrative as her growth has a major impact on Frieren.

The song "Yūsha" was sourced from the short story, titled Fanfare for Frieren (奏送, Sōsō), written by Jirō Kiso and supervised by Yamada, telling about protagonist Frieren visiting a small town called "Music City" five years after the death of the hero Himmel. She receives a difficult request from an old woman she meets in a place filled with music. It incorporates the main character Frieren's emotional changes and memories towards the hero Himmel, expressing the lonely and melancholy atmosphere of the anime. Originally, the opening theme would focus on the worldview of Frieren's journey; however, the songwriter Ayase was not satisfied with the original version of the song, which he felt had "too much emphasis on the atmosphere". Thus, Ayase decided to rework the song even after submitting its first version to the anime's team.

In the anime adaptation, Frieren is voiced by Atsumi Tanezaki in Japanese. Because of Frieren's age, Tanezaki opted to use her lowest register to deliver her lines. She also sought to convey the generally relaxed tone of the series in her delivery. Mallorie Rodak voices Frieren in the English dub. Rodak appreciated voicing Frieren, having liked the character.

== Fictional character biography ==
Frieren is an elven mage who was a member of the group that defeated the Demon King. Although she appears to be very young, she was born into a long-lived race of elves and has lived for over a thousand years. Due to her long lifespan, her perception of time differs greatly from that of humans; she considers decades brief and often finds human emotions and social norms difficult to grasp.

Frieren was initially raised in an unnamed village which was destroyed in an attack by the Demon King's forces. Escaping from this raid, she was taken in by a human mage named Flamme, and began learning magic under Flamme's tutelage. Centuries later, she joined Himmel's party, and after a ten-year journey their party defeated the Demon King. The party disbanded after this victory, and after Himmel's eventual death of old age, Frieren regretted that she had not become closer to him during his lifetime. As a result, she began another journey to learn more about humanity. On this second journey, she has been accompanied by a human apprentice, Fern; Frieren began mentoring Fern at the suggestion of her former party member Heiter. Frieren's goal is to reach the region of Aureole, a region in the far north where the souls of the dead are believed to reside, in the hopes of seeing Himmel again and giving him a more proper farewell.

Frieren's high level of magical skill and antipathy for demons have led her to receive the moniker "Frieren the Slayer" (葬送のフリーレン, Sōsō no Furīren); the original Japanese phrase could also be translated as "Frieren the Undertaker".

Despite her stoic nature, Frieren has several eccentricities. She enjoys collecting mostly trivial or non-combat spells, often drawn to any form of magic that is novel or unusual, regardless of its practicality. She sometimes takes on jobs in exchange for magical books and is fond of dungeon exploration, particularly when treasure chests are involved — occasionally opening mimics (a creature adapted from fantasy role play media) despite recognizing the danger. Though indifferent to wealth or fame, she is expressive when acquiring magical tomes, has a large appetite, dislikes waking early, is self-conscious about her slim physique, and rejects being called old.

== Reception ==
=== Popularity ===
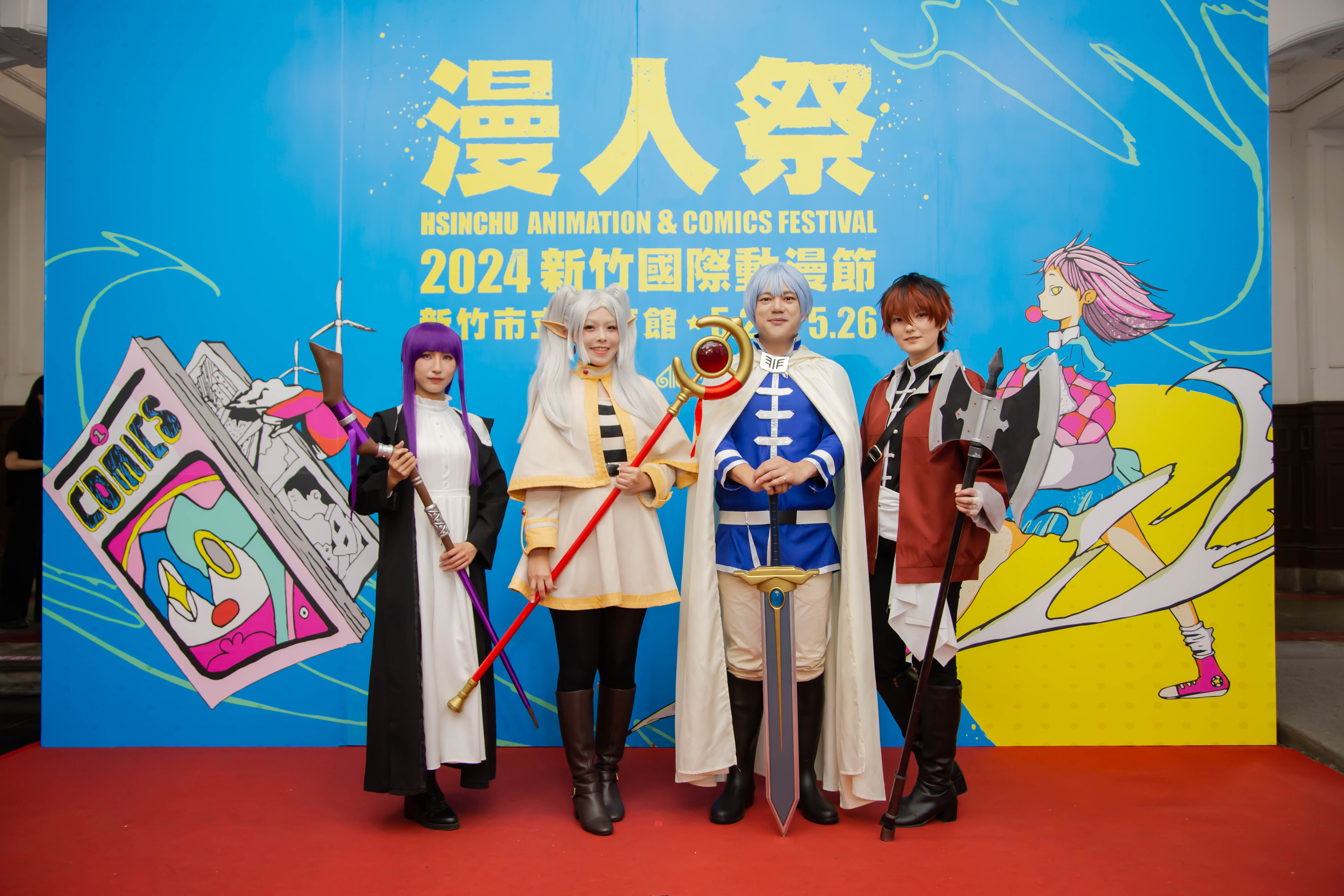
Taiwan's Hsinchu mayor Ann Kao (second from the left) cosplays as Frieren to promote the Hsinchu Animation and Comics Festival in 2024.

A frame from the twelfth episode of the anime, in which Frieren makes a smug expression while presenting a clothes-dissolving potion, has attained popularity on social media. In November 2025, a sketch of Frieren's head from a low angle by Reddit user SpaceDev1 went viral and inspired beginner and professional artists to make their own versions of the piece.

In the 2024 Anime Grand Prix, Frieren took seventh place in the Best Character category. She won the Newtype Anime Award for Best Female Character in 2024. At the 9th Crunchyroll Anime Awards, Frieren was nominated for "Best Main Character" and "Must Protect At All Costs" Character. Seven of Frieren's international voice actors were nominated for the "Best Voice Artist Performance" category, namely Atsumi Tanezaki (Japanese), Mallorie Rodak (English), Sandra Villa (Castilian), Marie Nonnenmacher (French), Natasha John (Hindi), Martina Felli (Italian), and Erika Ugalde (Spanish); however, they lost to Aoi Yūki's Maomao, Aleks Le and Masumi Mutsuda's Sung Jin-woo, Adrien Antoine's Kafka Hibino, Lohit Sharma's Satoru Gojo, Ilaria Pellicone's Kyomoto, and Miguel Ángel Leal's Eren Jaeger, respectively.

=== Critical response ===
Critical response to Frieren was mostly positive. Anime News Network claimed that Frieren's story stands out in among other fantasies due to its focus on her regrets after Himmel's death even if the time spent with him was not much for the elf race. Frieren was compared to the story of Rip Van Winkle as it similarly reflects the changes of times in the eyes of the protagonist which makes him and Frieren highly relatable. The funeral of Himmel changes Frieren's character as she decides to go on a journey to sort out her feelings for the hero. Siliconera commented the manga helps to make readers sympathize with the elf's lifespan as the protagonist looks for a way to make the same regrets she had with Himmel and live a different life. This is highly notable in the episodic nature of the manga where Frieren now lives remembering all the lessons Himmel taught her and applies it to how she meets new people and value them more. Crunchyroll also found Frieren to go through a notable character arc when Himmel dies and starts a new journey taking care of disciple of Heiter and Eisen's disciples, Fern and Stark, respectively, which he compared more to a role-playing game rather than action fantasy. Another aspect of Frieren's new persona is in how she begins to understand the relative briefness of human lives, and begins treasuring her human companions. GamesRadar+ remarked that, unlike other shōnen manga in the fantasy genre, Frieren's series focused more on slice-of-life happenings than on fighting.

Richard Eisenbeis of Anime News Network praised the dynamics between the main characters as Frieren quickly goes through an arc when meeting Fern and Stark as her perspective of time changes as she meets these two teenagers while also building up her backstory with each episode. The further developments of Frieren's journey alongside the growing romance of Fern and Stark was notable to Anime News Network as it helps to give further depth to the protagonist and Himmel's apparent relationship; While it becomes obvious to the audience that Himmel was in love with Frieren, the previous state the elf was in might not reciprocate his feelings, giving a sense of romantic tragedy. Sequential Tart compared Frieren to Spock: "logical and aloof and having difficulty understanding humans, but also getting closer to being like humans as she goes." Sheena McNeil of the same website called the concept of "what happens to the party when the quest is over?" interesting, praising as well Frieren's struggling with "becoming less detached" and seeing her experiencing the "lovely poignant moments, bittersweet ones, and happy ones".

The eventual reveal of Frieren's past and nickname "Frieren the Slayer" was noted by Fiction Horizon as displaying new sides to her personality: the discovery that Frieren's family had been killed by demons, and the reveal of her cold and ruthless approach to fighting demons, was noted as a contrast to her otherwise easygoing nature. Comic Book Resources also recognized that Frieren's viewpoint on the demons is quite different from that of other famous protagonists like Tanjiro from Demon Slayer: Kimetsu no Yaiba, though they see this as a breath of fresh air for anime as a whole. This is mostly exemplified in Frieren's duel with Aura, which ends with Frieren magically compelling Aura to kill herself. The Fandom Post acclaimed Frieren's true nature and backstory, with writer Dan Mansfield stating that it had surprised him how previous episodes built up the protagonist's hidden skills until Frieren's duel with Aura. Richard Eisenbeis of Anime News Network awarded Frieren as a best character of 2023 due to how she "carries" the series with her characterization, remarking that she was able to pivot between serious and comical modes while still keeping a noble and tragic arc.
