= Vinland Saga season 1 =

2019 Japanese television season

Vinland Saga
- Season 1
- Cover art for the first home media volume of the season, featuring Thorfinn (left) and Askeladd (right)
- No. of episodes: 24

Release
- Original network: NHK General TV
- Original release: July 8 – December 30, 2019

Season chronology
- Next → Season 2

The Vinland Saga anime television series is based on the manga series Vinland Saga by Makoto Yukimura. Twin Engine announced in March 2018 that the manga would receive an anime series adaptation, with the first season being produced by Wit Studio. The series is directed by Shūhei Yabuta, with Hiroshi Seko handling series composition, Takahiko Abiru designing the characters and Yutaka Yamada composing the music. The series focuses on Thorfinn, the young Iceland villager who aims to participate in wars like his retired father, Thors.

The first season premiered on July 8, 2019, with the first three episodes airing consecutively, and finished weekly on December 30 of the same year. (Note: NHK listed the series premiere on July 7 at 24:10, which is effectively July 8 at 12:10 a.m. JST.) The series ran for 24 episodes on NHK General TV. Amazon streamed the first season in North America and Australia on their Prime Video service, while Netflix later secured international streaming rights of the series. Due to the pending arrival of Typhoon Faxai on September 8, 2019, Episode 10 was delayed due to broadcasting news, and resumed on the next week. Due to the airing of the World Para Athletics Championship sports tournament on NHK, Episode 18 was delayed and resumed on November 17, of the same year.

The season was collected in a total of four Blu-ray volumes released by VAP between December 25, 2019, and March 25, 2020. Sentai Filmworks collected the episodes in a Blu-ray box for the English release. The first opening theme is "Mukanjyo" by Survive Said the Prophet while the first ending theme is "Torches" by Aimer. The second opening theme is "Dark Crow" by Man with a Mission and the second ending theme is "Drown" by Milet.

== Episodes ==
No. overall	No. in season	Title	Directed by	Written by	Original release date
1	1	"Somewhere Not Here"; Transliteration: "Koko de wa Nai Dokoka" (Japanese: ここではないどこか)	Shūhei Yabuta	Hiroshi Seko	July 8, 2019
In a Viking sea battle at Hjörungavágr, the fierce warrior Thors Snorresson is tired of the killing and after falling into the sea he deserts his men. Fifteen years later, Thors leads a peaceful life in Iceland with his wife Helga, their fifteen-year-old daughter Ylva and six-year-old son Thorfinn. However, Thorfinn longs for adventure and is eager to know more about the world. He dreams of a paradise called Vinland that he hears about from the great adventurer Leif Erikson. One day, Thors takes in a runaway slave. The following day, the slave's master, the brutal Halfdan, arrives at the village demanding the slave be returned. Thors refuses and purchases the slave for the price of eight sheep; the slave dies shortly after.
2	2	"Sword"; Transliteration: "Ken" (Japanese: 剣)	Yōji Satō	Hiroshi Seko	July 8, 2019
In the year 1002, the war between England and Denmark was intensifying and the English massacre a band of Vikings in Northumbria. A band of Jomsvikings, led by the intimidating Floki, visit Thorfinn's village to enlist Thors in their war against the English. Thors was their former commander, known as the Troll of Jom. He is obliged to join Floki, along with a ship and men, in order to protect the villagers from being taken hostage. Thorfinn and the young men in the village are excited by the prospect of going to war but they have little understanding of what it is really like. Meanwhile, in the Faroe Islands Floki conspires with Askeladd to slaughter Thors and his crew once they arrive, as punishment for deserting fifteen years earlier.
3	3	"Troll"; Transliteration: "Tororu" (Japanese: 戦鬼(トロル))	Yōsuke Yamamoto	Hiroshi Seko	July 8, 2019
Askeladd, the leader of a band of a hundred Vikings, bargains with Floki and demands double the price to kill Thors. Back in the village, the young men buzz with excitement as they prepare for their first battle. Together with five men from the village and Leif Erikson's crew, they set sail in two ships to meet Floki. However, Leif Erikson reveals to a young woman that Thors has no intention of taking the young men to the battlefield. Once at sea, the young men find the going tough and Thors angrily discovers that Thorfinn has stowed away on the ship. When they stop to rest and resupply in the Faroe Islands, they are caught in a trap set by Askeladd. One fighter, Bjorn, eats a fly agaric mushroom and prepares to fight Thors alone to test his skill, but Thors jumps aboard their ship and attacks them instead.
4	4	"A True Warrior"; Transliteration: "Hontō no Senshi" (Japanese: 本当の戦士)	Michiru Itabisashi	Hiroshi Seko	July 29, 2019
Thors advances through Askeladd's men, beating but not killing them, until he faces Bjorn who is in a berserker rage after eating the mushroom. He defeats Bjorn and challenges Askeladd to a duel. After a fierce swordfight, Thors defeats Askeladd, but surrenders to save Thorfinn and his villagers. He is then slain by a volley of arrows. Having witnessed the death of his father, Thorfinn stows away on the captured ship and swears revenge against Askeladd.
5	5	"The Troll's Son"; Transliteration: "Tororu no Ko" (Japanese: 戦鬼(トロル)の子)	Tomoko Hiramuki, Yōji Satō	Kenta Ihara, Hiroshi Seko	August 5, 2019
Askeladd and his men land in England near the Humber River to resupply and they pillage a local village. Thorfinn scrambles ashore and during the night prepares to kill the sleeping Askeladd but cannot do it. Thorfinn trains alone in the woods before emerging to challenge Askeladd to a duel. Thorfinn is easily defeated again, but Askeladd recognizes his strength and promises Thorfinn a chance to fight him again should he prove himself in battle.
6	6	"The Journey Begins"; Transliteration: "Tabi no Hajimari" (Japanese: 旅の始まり)	Yōsuke Yamamoto	Kenta Ihara, Hiroshi Seko	August 12, 2019
Askeladd and his men row upriver to Gainsborough where they find a band of dead Vikings. Thorfinn follows along, sickened by the stench of death in the air. Askeladd strikes a deal with the Danish forces to join their campaign to conquer England for money and spoils. That night the English attack them, firing volleys of arrows into their camp, killing a number of men before they retaliate. Thorfinn tries to enter the battle and is trapped by an English swordsman, but Thorfinn is saved by Askeladd. Nevertheless, Thorfinn eventually defends himself and kills for the first time – an English soldier. Thorfinn joins Askeladd's band and over the following years he hones his fighting skills. He becomes a ruthless fighter with his short sword, eager for a rematch against Askeladd. Thorfinn is badly wounded while in East Anglia and is rescued by an English girl and her kind mother. However, he later signals Askeladd whose ships are anchored offshore and his men land and raid the village.
7	7	"Normanni"; Transliteration: "Norumanni" (Japanese: 北人(ノルマンニ))	Shingo Uchida	Kenta Ihara, Hiroshi Seko	August 19, 2019
The Danish King, Sweyn Forkbeard, withdraws his troops from England over the winter. With the invasion of England on hold, Askeladd's band set sail for opportunities in France. They offer their services to the Normans and Thorfinn, now a young man, is sent to negotiate. Their plan goes well and Askeladd's band loot the treasury of the fort and Thorfinn delivers the head of their leader to Askeladd. Askeladd finally agrees to honour his bargain to duel with Thorfinn.
8	8	"Beyond the Edge of the Sea"; Transliteration: "Umi no Hate no Hate" (Japanese: 海の果ての果て)	Tomoaki Koshida	Kenta Ihara, Hiroshi Seko	August 26, 2019
Askeladd and his men return to the money-hungry feudal lord Gorm's village on the Jutland Peninsula with the spoils of their adventures. Thorfinn has a rematch with Askeladd, only to be defeated when Askeladd goads him into making an angry, reckless attack. In the year 1013, the Danish King Sweyn leads an invasion of northern England, with Danish forces and Viking mercenaries such as Askeladd landing near Gainsborough, but they come to a halt at the heavily defended merchant city of London.
9	9	"The Battle of London Bridge"; Transliteration: "Rondon-bashi no Shitō" (Japanese: ロンドン橋の死闘)	Michiru Itabisashi	Kenta Ihara, Hiroshi Seko	September 2, 2019
The Danish forces are stopped at the fortified London Bridge, guarded by Thorkell the Tall – a fearsome Dane who is supporting the English. Askeladd offers Thorfinn another duel if he can deliver Thorkell's head. Thorfinn attacks Thorkell, but the giant Viking is too experienced and Thorfinn has to retreat with his injuries. Arriving at an impasse, King Sweyn leaves his son, the Prince Canute to maintain the siege with Ragnar, while the rest of the army heads to Wessex.
10	10	"Ragnarok"; Transliteration: "Ragunaroku" (Japanese: ラグナロク)	Yūsuke Sunouchi, Aiko Sakuraba	Kenta Ihara, Hiroshi Seko	September 16, 2019
Ragnar's men become impatient with the siege, spurred by the taunts of Thorkell, but he keeps them in check. Askeladd's men are also becoming bored from inactivity, but after they learn that Thorkell has gone in pursuit of Sweyn's army, he renews the assault on London.
11	11	"A Gamble"; Transliteration: "Kake" (Japanese: 賭け)	Shigatsu Yoshikawa	Kenta Ihara, Hiroshi Seko	September 23, 2019
Thorkell continues on his way to catch Sweyn's army with Ragnar and Prince Canute as his hostages, but a group of the Danish army catch up to them and threaten to wipe them out. Thorkell cunningly releases the hostages, but then goads the Danish soldiers into a senseless attack which they cannot win, fighting at close quarters. Meanwhile, Askeladd starts a forest fire, causing smoke which confuses the combatants, and sends in Thorfinn to capture the prince. Thorkell decides not to waste his men by fighting Thorfinn and allows him to take the prince.
12	12	"The Land on the Far Bank"; Transliteration: "Taigan no Kuni" (Japanese: 対岸の国)	Yōji Satō	Kenta Ihara, Hiroshi Seko	September 30, 2019
Askeladd now has Prince Canute, but he is hotly pursued by Thorkell and his men and sends for reinforcements. They reach the Bristol Channel, and are greeted by the Welsh general Gratianus with reinforcements from the Morgannwg kingdom. However, as they reach the kingdom of Brycheiniog, they are surrounded by archers on the hilltops.
13	13	"Child of a Hero"; Transliteration: "Eiyū no Ko" (Japanese: 英雄の子)	Yōsuke Yamamoto	Kenta Ihara, Hiroshi Seko	October 7, 2019
In November 1013 AD, Floki reports to the King of Denmark that the Danish forces have defeated the English in Wessex, but he also has to report that Thorkell may have taken Canute. Meanwhile in Wales, Asser of Brycheiniog blocks Askeladd's passage until Askeladd reveals that he has Welsh ancestry, claiming to be a descendant of King Artorius and will work to protect Wales when England is defeated by the Danes. Prince Canute cannot bring himself to confront the Welsh so Askeladd and his men surrender their weapons to receive safe passage through Brycheiniog, appearing as if they are prisoners. At the Northern edge of Mercia they alter direction to join the main Danish army in Gainsborough.
14	14	"The Light of Dawn"; Transliteration: "Gyōkō" (Japanese: 暁光)	Atsushi Kobayashi	Kenta Ihara, Hiroshi Seko	October 14, 2019
As Askeladd and his men cross northern Mercia, they are caught in early winter snows. Cold and hungry, they come across a village of Christians and pillage it, taking all of their food. They kill the villagers so that no-one can reveal their location. The only survivor is a young woman who was in the woods outside the village seeking penitence because of a cheap ring she had stolen at a fair.
15	15	"After Yule"; Transliteration: "Yuru no Ato" (Japanese: 冬至祭(ユル)のあと)	Michiru Itabisashi	Kenta Ihara, Hiroshi Seko	October 21, 2019
Thorkell reaches Gloucester, but learns that the English nobles are tired of war and are ready to accept Danish rule. Some English troops find Askeladd's group, and his men begin to think his good luck has run out. Askeladd orders Bjorn to kill Prince Canute's guardian, Ragnar, blaming it on a skirmish with the English and hoping that the prince will become a leader whom he can follow.
16	16	"History of Beasts"; Transliteration: "Kedamono no Rekishi" (Japanese: ケダモノの歴史)	Takashi Andō	Kenta Ihara, Hiroshi Seko	October 28, 2019
Askeladd tells Thorfinn to guard Canute and tortures a captured English captain, seeking information. He is interrupted to be told that Thorkell is approaching. Fearing defeat, some of his men decide to desert and attempt to join Thorkell, who kills them when they arrive. Askeladd reaches the shallow upper Severn River and cuts down a short bridge. However, Thorkell catches up with them. Many of Askeladd's men begin to doubt his ability as leader and he is faced with a full scale mutiny.
17	17	"Servant"; Transliteration: "Tsukaeshi Mono" (Japanese: 仕えし者)	Daisuke Kurose, Michiru Itabisashi, Yōsuke Yamamoto	Kenta Ihara, Hiroshi Seko	November 4, 2019
Threatened by a mutiny, Askeladd recalls feeding his sickly mother while she told him about their ancestor King Artorius who was recovering from his battle wounds in Avalon, a heaven-like place whence he would return to save their people from their suffering. Askeladd informs his men of his secret hatred of the Danes and immediately lashes out and kills two of them. Bjorn takes off in the sled with Thorfinn, Canute and the drunken priest, with ten men in pursuit, leaving Askeladd to face the rest of his former loyal followers. The men chasing the sled successfully crash it and capture the Prince, while Thorfinn steals one of their horses and rides back to prevent anyone else from killing Askeladd before he can extract his own revenge. Meanwhile, Askeladd slays many of his former comrades but is incapacitated by a volley of arrows. Thorkell arrives and gives Askeladd's men an opportunity to die fighting. Suddenly, Thorfinn storms in and challenges Thorkell to a duel over Askeladd.
18	18	"Out of the Cradle"; Transliteration: "Yurikago no Soto" (Japanese: ゆりかごの外)	Shūjirō Ami, Atsushi Kobayashi	Kenta Ihara, Hiroshi Seko	November 18, 2019
Thorfinn duels with Thorkell to decide the fate of Askeladd. Meanwhile, Canute lies still in the snow and daydreams about Ragnar, who apologizes for raising him as a son instead of a prince, and bids farewell. After awakening from his reverie, Canute has an epiphany while talking to the priest who talks about the difference between love and discrimination, and Canute decides to confront the current situation himself. He stares down and calms the berserker Bjorn, who is stabbed by Atli, one of the Askeladd's men. He orders the priest to heal Bjorn while he accepts the challenge of being king. Back at the duel, Thorkell kicks Thorfinn, sending him crashing into nearby trees.
19	19	"United Front"; Transliteration: "Kyōtō" (Japanese: 共闘)	Yōji Satō, Michiru Itabisashi	Kenta Ihara, Hiroshi Seko	November 25, 2019
Thorfinn has a broken arm and ribs from Thorkell's kick, and Thorkell allows him to be treated by Askeladd. Thorkell explains that he and Thors were commanders of the Jomsvikings and their leader Sigvaldi, who was Thorkell older brother, gave him one of his daughters, Helga. This means that Thorkell is Thorfinn's great-uncle. Thors was considered dead after falling into the sea at the sea battle of Hjörungavágr, but three months after a funeral was held for him, Thorkell found him leaving the Jomsvikings with Helga and their daughter. Thors renounced a life of fighting and after knocking Thorkell unconscious, he left. The duel resumes, but as Thorkell is about to finish Thorfinn, Askeladd reflects light into Thorkell's eyes, blinding him for a moment, and Thorfinn knocks Thorkell to the ground by hitting his weak chin, and gouges out an eye. Thorkell's men prepare to kill Thorfinn, but Thorkell stops them, claiming that Thorfinn has won the duel. Canute arrives at the scene, and tells Thorkell that there is no value keeping him hostage because King Sweyn has already chosen his older brother Harold as his successor and expected Canute to be killed in battle. With newfound resolution, Canute declares that he will march against the king at Gainsborough, and both Askeladd and Thorkell agree to join him.
20	20	"Crown"; Transliteration: "Ōkan" (Japanese: 王冠)	Michiru Itabisashi	Kenta Ihara, Hiroshi Seko	December 2, 2019
At Gainsborough, Canute and his followers confront Floki and the Danish army, and he demands passage to see King Sweyn. At the castle, Canute sends Thorkell to drink with the other commanders while he goes to confront the king, flanked by Askeladd and Thorfinn. They sense an ambush in the darkened hall and King Sweyn confirms that he wants Canute dead. King Sweyn prepares to have them killed; however, Askeladd intercedes and reminds the king that Canute has delivered a victory over London via Thorkell's forces. The king decides to spare Canute, who decides that it is prudent to join forces with the king for the present. Rangar's brother Gunnar approaches Canute and swears to serve him, however Askeladd mistrusts him. Later, Askeladd sends Alti and his brother back home, ordering him never to raise a sword again.
21	21	"Reunion"; Transliteration: "Saikai" (Japanese: 再会)	Yūsuke Sunouchi	Kenta Ihara, Hiroshi Seko	December 9, 2019
In the year 1014, on instructions from King Selwyn, Canute takes his followers to York, a Danish occupied town in the Northumbria Region. As their boats row up the Ouse river, Canute is shot in the chest by a crossbow arrow fired by an assassin who is tracked down and killed by Thorfinn. Thorfinn is recognized by Leif from his village in Iceland and they are joyfully reunited. However Thorfinn is not interested in returning home, but intent only to extract his revenge on Askeladd. Meanwhile, it is revealed that Canute was not shot, but instead it was a woman slave dressed as his double. Canute orders that everything be done to save her. As they pass Floki, Askeladd loudly infers that Canute has enemies in York. It is revealed later, that Askeladd himself hired the assassin to promote rumors that the king wants Canute dead. To further his plans, Askeladd also feeds information to Gunnar who is spying for the king. Meanwhile, Thorfinn, whose broken arm has not yet healed, is anxious to settle his debt with Askeladd. Thorfinn calls him out to a duel to be observed by Canute and Thorkell. Before they start, the mortally wounded Bjorn challenges Askeladd to enter Valhalla. Bjorn is defeated, but also receives Askeladd's assurances that they are true friends before the latter mercifully kills his friend. Askeladd then prepares to face Thorfinn.
22	22	"Lone Wolf"; Transliteration: "Korō" (Japanese: 孤狼)	Yasuo Ejima	Kenta Ihara, Hiroshi Seko	December 16, 2019
Thorfinn and Askeladd prepare to duel, however Askeladd surprisingly throws away his sword. Thorfinn angrily attacks him, but he is no match for Askeladd who has fought with him over a dozen times and knows his moves and weaknesses. Askeladd beats Thorfinn into unconsciousness, and Canute stops the fight when Askeladd has delivered the winning blow. Askeladd then recounts his upbringing as the son of a slave woman, who attracted the attention of his Viking father Olaf because of his fighting skills. He eventually took revenge and killed Olaf, but cast suspicion on another son who was executed for the murder. He details his contempt for the attitude of the Vikings who live only for battle, conquest and revenge. He chides Thorfinn for having learned nothing while Askeladd exploited the boy for his own ends. Canute asks Askeladd why he supports him, and Askeladd simply replies that Canute is the one most fit to be king of the Vikings.
23	23	"Miscalculation"; Transliteration: "Gosan" (Japanese: 誤算)	Yōsuke Yamamoto	Kenta Ihara, Hiroshi Seko	December 23, 2019
While in York, King Sweyn convenes the Imperial Council, but the situation is tense among the Danish leaders following the assassination attempt on Canute. Sweyn addresses the elders of Denmark, and after announcing the successful Viking conquest of England, he openly praises Canute and Thorkell. He hands control of Mercia, the most prosperous part of England, to Canute and then announces preparations for an attack on Ireland in revenge for the humiliation of King Harald by Brian Boru. Askeladd believes his strategies for Canute's ascendancy have worked, however he is horrified when Sweyn also announces his intention to subdue Wales in the coming spring because he believes they are sowing the seeds of rebellion. Meanwhile, the badly beaten Thorfinn is thrown in jail after creating a disturbance in the street. Leif Erikson visits Thorfinn in jail, and promises to return him to Iceland and then onto the warm and fertile Vinland. Back at the Imperial Council, Floki tells Sweyn of Askeladd's reaction to the announced attack on Wales which he believes shows a weakness for the Welsh. Askeladd vainly tries to think of a plan to thwart the king and confesses to Thorkell that his mother was Welsh, but swears him to secrecy. Askeladd is then called before the king, and wonders why his luck always deserts him at the eleventh hour.
24	24	"End of the Prologue (Note: This episode has an English title only, stylized in all caps in the original Japanese release)"	Tadahito Matsubayashi, Shūhei Yabuta	Kenta Ihara, Hiroshi Seko	December 30, 2019
While Askeladd receives his reward for saving Prince Canute, he daringly questions King Sweyn's order to subjugate his own homeland of Wales. Askeladd justifies his statement by saying that the poor mountainous country of Wales is not worth the cost to conquer, and offers to broker a peace instead. Surprisingly, Sweyn accepts Askeladd's counsel, but then forces him to choose between Wales or Canute – if he chooses Wales, he must deliver the head of Canute. Meanwhile, Leif Erikson almost convinces the badly beaten Thorfinn to sail away with him, but the youth returns to the Imperial Council. Sweyn's offer and badmouthing of Askeladd's mother proves too much for Askeladd who openly insults the king and denounces him. He reveals that his real name is Lucius Artorius Castus, and claims to be the legitimate heir to rule Britannia. Floki tries to save the King, but Askeladd beheads His Majesty before anyone can move and then fights alone against the Danish soldiers. Prince Canute realizes that Askeladd is playacting to protect him, but Thorkell reminds the prince that Askeladd is his man, so Canute steps forward and kills Askeladd with a stab to the heart. Thorfinn arrives only to have Askeladd die in his arms. Distraught at missing his last chance to duel with Askeladd and finally avenge his father, Thorfinn attacks and cuts Prince Canute in distress and despair, but Prince Canute takes charge and claims command of the Viking army and the rule of England. Thorfinn is dragged away, and as he drops his knife in the chaos, his erstwhile journey flashes in the blade's reflection. The episode ends with shots of several previously unseen characters in various locations.

== Home media release ==
=== Japanese ===
VAP (Japan, Region 2/A)
Volume	Episodes	Release date	Ref.
1	1–6	December 25, 2019	
2	7–12	January 22, 2020	
3	13–18	February 19, 2020	
4	19–24	March 25, 2020	

=== English ===
Sentai Filmworks (North America, Region 1/A)
Volume	Episodes	Release date	Limited edition release date	Ref.
Season 1	1–24	August 31, 2021	July 26, 2022	
