= Music of Vinland Saga =

Anime series discography

Vinland Saga (Japanese: ヴィンランド・サガ, Hepburn: Vinrando Saga) is a Japanese anime television series based on Makoto Yukimura's manga series Vinland Saga. The anime uses multiple opening and closing themes as well as two soundtracks.

== Singles ==
The first opening theme is "Mukanjyo" by Survive Said the Prophet, while the first ending theme is "Torches" by Aimer. Yosh from Survive Said the Prophet said he the band found the theme comfortable to play thanks to their relationship with Yabuta while Aimer instead wanted to portray the emotions Thorfinn and Thors share in the early episodes in an attempt to "pass the torch". The second opening theme is "Dark Crow" by Man with a Mission, and the second ending theme is "Drown" by Milet. "Dark Crow" is intended to follow the Viking theme while Milet said that the overlapping music in "Drown" is meant to immerse listeners into Thorfinn's new conflicting world.

For the second season, the first opening theme is "River" by Anonymouz, while the first ending theme is "Without Love" by LMYK. Anonymouz wanted to portray through her songs the weakened Thorfinn and what new emotions the protagonist could obtain as a slave. LMYK expressed similar desires but in a more tragic nature as the song is meant to show the hopelessness and regrets the character suffered. The second opening theme is "Paradox" by Survive Said the Prophet, and the second ending theme is "Ember" by haju:harmonics. Yosh was inspired to write more stylish lyrics with far more hopes. haju:harmonics, meanwhile, wanted to portray courage and hope with her song.

== Season 1 ==
The soundtrack of the series was composed by Yutaka Yamada while the sound effects director was Shoji Hata. Inspired by the manga, Yamada wanted the music to represent the psychological states of Thorfinn and other characters. Yabuta and Hata often had discussions in regards to what kind of music they should use. In testing, Yamada provided Yabuta with a demo of 26 songs, made to represent and amplify the emotion a character was displaying. Yabuta was impressed with Yamada's works, giving for example the first season finale where the music elevates Thorfinn's mental breakdown at Askeladd's death. While Hata helped Yamada in the first season, for the second season he worked alone. Yamada's favorite theme was the piano theme in the first episode which he felt fit the story and visuals. This led to the next season having more piano tracks.

Vinland Saga Original Soundtrack

Soundtrack album by Yutaka Yamada
- Released: February 19, 2020
- Length: 141:20
- Label: Sony Music Records
- Director: Kōhei Chida
- Producer: Sayaka Konno

Vinland Saga soundtrack albums chronology
Vinland Saga Original Soundtrack (2020)	Vinland Saga Season 2 Original Soundtrack (2023)

TV Animation Vinland Saga Original Soundtrack (TVアニメ「ヴィンランド・サガ」オリジナル・サウンドトラック, TV Anime「Vinrando Saga」Orijinaru・Saundotorakku) was composed by Yutaka Yamada, and released on February 19, 2020, by Sony Music Records.

=== Track listing ===
Disc 1
No.	Title	Length
1.	"Troll (戦鬼, Ikusa Oni; lit. 'war demon')"	3:50
2.	"Normanni (ノルマンニ, Norumanni)"	4:00
3.	"Small village (小村, Shōson)"	4:06
4.	"Savage wind (腥風, Namagusa Kaze)"	3:40
5.	"Dagger (短剣, Tanken)"	5:15
6.	"Tide (潮流, Chōryū)"	3:30
7.	"Still blade (不動の剣, Fudō no Ken; lit. 'immovable blade')"	3:48
8.	"The true warrior (本当の戦士, Hontō no Senshi)"	2:59
9.	"Utopia (理想郷, Risōkyō)"	3:40
10.	"Fierce (力動, Ryoku Dō; lit. 'power motion')"	3:41
11.	"Tenderness (ぬくもり, Nukumori)"	2:34
12.	"Enter the war (参戦, Sansen)"	2:37
13.	"Battleground (戦場, Senjō)"	6:43
14.	"Premonition (予感, Yokan)"	3:02
15.	"Somewhere else (ここではないどこか, Koko de wa nai Doko ka; lit. 'somewhere not here')"	4:34
16.	"Dual blades (双剣, Sō Ken)"	5:33
17.	"Chill rain (冷雨, Reiu)"	3:52
18.	"An ace (切り札, Kirifuda)"	1:01
19.	"Cliff road (崖路, Gake Michi)"	1:16
20.	"Rusty sword (錆びた剣, Sabita Ken)"	6:37
Total length:		76:18

Disc 2
No.	Title	Length
1.	"Flashpoint (火種, Hidane)"	4:42
2.	"Hero (英雄, Eiyū)"	1:23
3.	"Glory (暁光, Gyōkō; lit. 'light of dawn')"	2:28
4.	"Feast (宴, Utage)"	2:15
5.	"Troll's daughter (トロルの娘, Tororu no Musume)"	2:19
6.	"Father and son (父子, Fushi)"	3:27
7.	"Wildest history (ケダモノの歴史, Kedamono no Rekishi; lit. 'beast's history')"	3:23
8.	"Forced march (強行軍, Kyōkōgun)"	1:24
9.	"Slaughter (屠殺, Tosatsu)"	2:40
10.	"Countdown (秒読み, Byōyomi)"	2:34
11.	"Narrow escape (延命, Emmei; lit. 'prolonging life')"	3:06
12.	"Beast (野獣, Yajū)"	1:58
13.	"Mourning (喪心, Sōshin; lit. 'absent-mindedness')"	1:43
14.	"Awaken (目覚め, Mezame)"	5:11
15.	"Divine right (覇道, Hadō)"	3:13
16.	"Dead end (行き止まり, Ikidomari)"	1:13
17.	"Intertwined (交錯, Kōsaku)"	7:58
18.	"Ahead of the road (先へ, Saki e)"	4:59
19.	"End of the Prologue (果て無き世界 END OF THE PROLOGUE, Hate Naki Sekai END OF THE PROLOGUE)"	3:54
20.	"Mukanjyo" (TV size)	1:33
21.	"Torches" (TV size)	1:32
22.	"Dark Crow" (TV size)	1:36
23.	"Drown" (TV size)	1:31
Total length:		141:20

== Season 2 ==
The original soundtrack album contains 43 tracks and was released on February 19, 2020. The second original soundtrack album contains 20 tracks and was released on July 14, 2023.

Vinland Saga Season 2 Original Soundtrack

Soundtrack album by Yutaka Yamada
- Released: July 14, 2023
- Length: 93:06
- Label: Fujipacific Music Inc.

Vinland Saga soundtrack albums chronology
Vinland Saga Original Soundtrack (2020)	Vinland Saga Season 2 Original Soundtrack (2023)

TV Animation Vinland Saga Season 2 Original Soundtrack (TVアニメ「ヴィンランド・サガ」SEASON2 オリジナル・サウンドトラック, TV Anime「Vinrando Saga」SEASON2 Orijinaru・Saundotorakku) was composed by Yutaka Yamada, and released on July 14, 2023, by Fujipacific Music Inc..

=== Track listing ===
No.	Title	Length
1.	"Somewhere Not Here"	4:21
2.	"The King"	4:32
3.	"Servants"	2:39
4.	"Arnheid and Einar"	3:04
5.	"Destination"	5:29
6.	"Two Souls"	3:28
7.	"The Oath"	6:57
8.	"Dark Storm"	3:31
9.	"The Pit"	3:53
10.	"Unleashed Winds"	5:51
11.	"Arnheid's Theme"	4:05
12.	"Protest"	5:13
13.	"Farming"	4:02
14.	"The Path"	4:25
15.	"Itself"	3:49
16.	"Volition"	7:20
17.	"Fire"	4:33
18.	"Recalls"	4:22
19.	"Departure"	4:50
20.	"Normanni - 2023mix (Bonus)"	6:52
Total length:		93:06
