= The Story of Us (Milet song) =

2026 single by Milet

- Standard cover

Single by Milet

from the album Made of Glass
- Language: Japanese; English
- Released: March 4, 2026
- Length: 4:27
- Label: SME
- Songwriters: Milet; Yōichirō Nomura
- Producer: Evan Call

Milet singles chronology
"Goddess" / "Waterproof" / "Swamp" (2025)	"The Story of Us" (2026)	"Sunny" (2026)

Music video
- "The Story of Us" on YouTube

"The Story of Us" is a song recorded by Japanese singer Milet. It was released digitally on January 16, 2026, and in physical release on March 4, 2026, via SME Records. Serving as the ending theme song for the second season of the Japanese anime series Frieren: Beyond Journey's End, the song was written by Milet and Yoichiro Nomura while production was handled by Evan Call, who composed the music for the anime series.

== Background and release ==
In November 2024, a trailer for the second season of Frieren: Beyond Journey's End was released. The video featured a snippet of the season's ending theme song, "The Story of Us" by Milet. She previously provided music for Frieren with "Anytime Anywhere", the closing theme song for the first season and "Bliss", both later included on her ninth extended play (EP), Anytime Anywhere (2024).

On January 9, 2026, Milet announced the digital and physical release date for "The Story of Us". On January 16, "The Story of Us" was released digitally. The physical maxi single was released on March 4, 2026, with three different variants: the regular edition, limited edition and anime design version. The limited and anime design version include a bonus Blu-ray disc of music videos.

== Music video ==
A music video for "The Story of Us" premiered on Milet's YouTube channel hours after the digital release of the song. The video opens with Milet playing with two dolls within a puppet stage. As the video progresses, she explores a town in the countryside and a library. Near the end of video, she wanders ruins as a field of flowers grow around her. The video closes with Milet making the two dolls hug each other, with a credits scene featuring her overlooking a town.

The music video was filmed in the Czech Republic, with filming taking place in over ten different locations, including the historical library of Benedictine Abbey in Rajhrad. Filming of the music video took three days.

== Track listing ==
- CD single – standard and limited edition
1. "The Story of Us"
2. "Trace"
3. "Anytime Anywhere" (piano session)
- CD single – anime design edition
1. "The Story of Us"
2. "Trace"
3. "The Story of Us" (anime version)
4. "Trace" (short version)
5. "Anytime Anywhere" (A.Gt session)
- Blu-ray – anime design edition
1. "The Story of Us" (music video)
2. "Bluer" (music video)
3. "Anytime Anywhere" (music video)
4. "Anytime Anywhere" (live from the Stairs Tour)
5. "The Story of Us" (behind the scenes)
6. "Anytime Anywhere" (behind the scenes)

== Credits and personnel ==
Musicians

- Milet – lead vocals
- Yoichiro Nomura – acoustic guitar, bass
- Masaki Hori – drums
- Evan Call – banjo, mandolin
- Masateru Nishikata – cello
- Budapest Scoring Orchestra – orchestra
- Atsuki Yoshida – violin

Technical

- Evan Call – arrangement
- Zolton Pad – conductor
- Péter Illényi – conductor
- Tomowlow – mixing

== Charts ==
=== Weekly charts ===
Weekly chart performance for "The Story of Us"
Chart (2026)	Peak position
Japan (Oricon)	6
Japan Combined Singles (Oricon)	23
Japan Anime Singles (Oricon)	2
Japan Hot 100 (Billboard)	50
Japan Hot Animation (Billboard Japan)	16

=== Monthly charts ===
Monthly chart performance for "The Story of Us"
Chart (2026)	Position
Japan (Oricon)	19
Japan Anime Singles (Oricon)	4

== Release history ==
Release history and formats for "The Story of Us"
Region	Date	Format(s)	Version	Label	Ref.
Various	January 16, 2026	Digital download; streaming	Digital pre-release	SME	
Japan	March 4, 2026	CD	Regular	SME	
Japan	March 4, 2026	CD; Blu-ray	Limited	SME	
Japan	March 4, 2026	CD; Blu-ray	Limited anime	SME	
