= Made of Glass =

Made of Glass may refer to:

- made of glass
- Made of Glass (album), 2026 album by Milet
- "Made of Glass" (song), a 2013 song by KT Tunstall
- "Made of Glass", a song by Kylie Minogue, included on her single "Giving You Up"
- "Made of Glass", a song by Lil Yachty, from the album Teenage Emotions
