= Tokyo ESP =

Japanese manga and anime series

- Cover of the first volume as published by Kadokawa Shoten featuring Rinka Urushiba.

東京 ESP
- Genre: Science fantasy; Urban fantasy
- Manga
- Written by: Hajime Segawa
- Published by: Kadokawa Shoten
- English publisher: NA: Vertical
- Magazine: Monthly Shōnen Ace
- Original run: February 27, 2010 – July 26, 2016
- Volumes: 16
- Anime television series
- Directed by: Shigehito Takayanagi
- Produced by: Atsushi Itou
- Written by: Hideyuki Kurata
- Music by: Evan Call
- Studio: Xebec
- Licensed by: Crunchyroll: UK: Anime Limited
- Original network: Tokyo MX, BS11, CTC, tvk, TV Saitama, Sun TV, TVQ, GBS, MTV
- Original run: July 11, 2014 – September 26, 2014
- Episodes: 12
- icon

Tokyo ESP (東京ESP(イーエスプー), Tōkyō Īesupī) is a Japanese manga series by Hajime Segawa. It began serialization in Kadokawa Shoten's Shōnen Ace magazine on February 26, 2010, and finished on July 26, 2016. It follows a high school girl named Rinka Urushiba who lives with her father in poor conditions. This leads her to work part-time as a waitress. Her life changes when she gains the ability to use extrasensory perception (ESP). An anime television series adaptation produced by Xebec aired from July to September 2014.

== Plot ==
Tokyo ESP begins with Rinka Urushiba as a fairly normal high school girl, though she is a bit poor and her father who is a police officer is her only family. This forces her to work part-time as a waitress after high school in order to raise money for them to secure rent and food. One day, she sees a penguin and some glowing fish swimming through the sky. Rinka might have thought it was a hallucination if there had not been another witness with her. This witness is a boy from her school with a strangely scratched-up face. Out of curiosity, she touches one of the glowing fish, which causes her to pass out. After she wakes up, she finds out that she has developed the power to phase through inanimate objects such as the floor of her apartment. She meets a fellow high school student named Kyotaro Azuma who has the ability to teleport. The two of them use their ESP powers to take on individuals who have decided to use them for evil. However, there is an organization that is planning a bigger scheme to secure utopia with their ranks consisting of strong ESP fighters and users.

== Characters ==
=== Main characters ===
From left to right: Rinka Urushiba, Peggi (In Rinka's arms), Rindō Urushiba, Kobushi Kuroi, Murasaki Edoyama, and Kyōtarō Azuma.

Rinka Urushiba (漆葉 リンカ, Urushiba Rinka)
Voiced by: Ibuki Kido (Japanese); Sarah Wiedenheft (English)
In the first arc, Rinka is a high school girl with a strong sense of justice as a direct result of her father who is a former cop that taught her his ways. She gains the power to phase through inanimate objects at the start of the series. She is called "White Girl" by the media because when using her powers, her hair turns pure white. This only happens in the anime version.

Kyōtarō Azuma (東 京太郎, Azuma Kyōtarō)
Voiced by: Keisuke Koumoto (Japanese); Adam Dahlberg (English)
In the first arc, he attends to the same high school of Rinka and is Rinka's friend. Azuma has the ability of teleporting from one place to another. While hiding his identity as a hero, he uses a crow mask and a tuxedo and calls himself "Crow Head".

Ren Jōmyaku (条幕 蓮, Jōmyaku Ren)
In the second arc, her ESP power can form blocks of ice that can be placed on any kind of material. She is the target of terrorists because of her mysterious 'lock space' power.

Zeus Tetsuya (是臼 鉄矢, Tetsuya Zeusu)
In the second arc, he works for the ESP Police Force and is ordered to protect Ren. His ESP is metalbending even though the actuate of it is unknown as he is able to "transform" machinery and vehicles into "stuff". An example is he turned a police car into a robot.

Rindō Urushiba (漆葉 竜胆, Urushiba Rindō)
Voiced by: Tetsu Inada (Japanese); Bryan Massey (English)
Rinka's dad. He gains the power of creating a magnetic field around him attracting and repelling metallic objects. A former police officer who was forced to retire for being unable to look the other way at the corruption of his department. He has been unemployed ever since.

Kobushi Kuroi "Black Fist" (黒井 小節, Kuroi Kobushi)
Voiced by: Mai Aizawa (Japanese); Jenny Ledel (English)
Kobushi is a young thief who has the ability to become invisible. She is known to announce her misdeeds in advance. She is a very good boxer and loves fighting policemen mixing her invisibility ability and her boxing skill. She has a great ego and hates losing a fight. After being saved by Rindō, she develops a crush on him and calls him her "Prince". She starts staying with Rinka, much to her dismay.

Murasaki Edoyama (江戸山 紫, Edoyama Murasaki)
Voiced by: Azusa Tadokoro (Japanese); Lara Woodhull (English)
The daughter of a Yakuza boss, she gained psychometry, which is the ability to see an object's past by touching it from a glowing fish. If this power is used on a weapon then the skills its previous owner had are temporarily passed to Murasaki. Because of her low stamina, she cannot use them for too long.

Ayumu Oozora (大空 歩, Oozora Ayumu)
Voiced by: Megumi Ogata (Japanese); Morgan Berry (English)
A son of one of the most outspoken people against Espers and everything they stand for. He has the power of Precognition, but he can only see two seconds into the future. He is a middle school student with aspirations to be a member of Congress, like his mother. He always gets upset when someone calls his hairstyle an afro.

Pandaemon Youdani (養谷 藩田衛門, Youdani Pandaemon)
Voiced by: Kazuhiko Inoue (Japanese); R. Bruce Elliott (English)
A martial arts master who trained much of the Tokyo Police Force, including Rinka's father. He is constantly dressed in a panda suit and is an Esper himself, with the power of clairvoyance.

Peggi (ペギー, Pegī)
Voiced by: Kaoru Mizuhara (Japanese); Heather Walker (English)
A mysterious penguin with the ability to fly. It's also known as "The Collector" and has the power to remove and eat other people's ESP abilities.

Parrot (オウム, Ōmu)
Voiced by: Minori Chihara (Japanese); Jamie Marchi (English)
A pelican that Azuma meets when he is left on a deserted island and it helps him escape. It can communicate to him because it gained powers of Telepathy from the glowing fish. It later joins the heroes in their crime fighting. Its telepathy is so strong it can nullify the Professor's illusions.

=== Antagonists ===
The Professor/Hokusai Azuma (教授/東 北斎, Kyōju/Azuma Hokusai)
Voiced by: Yoshihisa Kawahara (Japanese); Jeffrey Schmidt (English)
Kyōtarō and Minami's adoptive father who leads the group that is letting the glowing fish roam free. His ESP powers allow him to create all types of illusions. He has a burn scar on the left side of his face that he keeps hidden behind an illusion. The murder of his wife and colleagues at the hands of someone from the Japanese government made him see the world as hopeless. He desires to change the world. After releasing thousands of glowing fish into Tokyo, he was seemly killed by The Siblings. However, he was shown to be alive. He was taken hostage instead.

Minami Azuma (東 美奈実, Azuma Minami)
Voiced by: Sachika Misawa (Japanese); Mallorie Rodak (English)
Minami is Azuma's adoptive sister who follows The Professor. She is also capable of teleporting. She fights wielding 2 katanas. Despite being ruthless while fighting, she still deeply cares for Kyōtarō and desires to defeat Rinka.

Kozuki Kuroi (黒井 弧月, Kuroi Kozuki)
Voiced by: Hiromi Konno (Japanese); Lindsay Seidel (English)
Kobushi's younger sister and the other Black Fist. She has a teleportation ability as well. However, she can only teleport other people and things and not herself by touching them. She desires the title of "Black Fist" in the Kuroi family. To do that, she must steal something valuable enough to please their grandmother. She joins the Professor for her own reasons.

Lin Lianjie (リン・リンチェイ, Rin Rinchei)
Voiced by: Yuki Matsuoka (Japanese); Trina Nishimura (English)
A Chinese girl recruited by the Professor who calls herself "The Evil Ghost of the Woods". Besides her martial arts, her ESP is the power of repulsion and is the opposite of Rindō's ESP. She likes to make attacks directed at the eyes.

=== Others ===
Nabeshima (鍋島, Nabeshima)
Voiced by: Yoshito Yasuhara (Japanese); Greg Dulcie (English)
A police Inspector and Rindō's former co-worker. He and the other cops received martial arts training from Master Youdani.

Reia Ōzora (大空 麗亜, Ōzora Reia)
Voiced by: Fuyuka Oura (Japanese); Linda Leonard (English)
Ayumu's mother who is a member of Congress. She believed all espers were criminals until she was saved by her son and started to change the way of seeing them.

== Production ==
Plans for Tokyo ESP started when Segawa was still doing his Ga-Rei manga, discussing ideas with his then editor and supervisor when the latter suggested that his next work should be based on superpowers. Segawa suggested that his protagonist should be based from someone in the Matrix series with the comical ability to use his fart as a weapon with the addition of drama before the supervisor told him to take out the farting ability. Segawa decided to go with the female lead like he did with the Ga-Rei manga series. During brainstorming, Segawa pitched an idea to his staff that the female could have fearsome superpowers due to the concern that the female lead will not be prominently known if a male character helps her out, which was met with some opposition from his supervisor again.

== Media ==
=== Manga ===
Tokyo ESP is written and illustrated by Hajime Segawa. It began serialization in Kadokawa Shoten's Shōnen Ace magazine with the April 2010 issue. The first tankōbon volume was released on July 26, 2010, and thirteen volumes have been released as of June 22, 2015. The English translation for the manga was released as 2-in-1 volumes in America.

==== Volumes ====
No.	Original release date	Original ISBN	English release date	English ISBN
1	July 26, 2010	978-4-04-715488-9	October 6, 2015	9781941220603
2	November 26, 2010	978-4-04-715560-2	October 6, 2015	9781941220603
3	March 26, 2011	978-4-04-715654-8	December 8, 2015	9781941220610
4	August 26, 2011	978-4-04-715760-6	December 8, 2015	9781941220610
5	January 26, 2012	978-4-04-120097-1	February 2, 2016	9781942993001
6	June 26, 2012	978-4-04-120294-4	February 2, 2016	9781942993001
7	December 26, 2012	978-4-04-120528-0	April 5, 2016	9781942993018
8	May 25, 2013	978-4-04-120674-4	April 5, 2016	9781942993018
9	December 26, 2013	978-4-04-120954-7	June 14, 2016	9781942993025
10	June 26, 2014	978-4-04-121060-4	June 14, 2016	9781942993025
11	July 26, 2014	978-4-04-101910-8	August 23, 2016	9781942993032
12	October 24, 2014	978-4-04-101911-5	August 23, 2016	9781942993032
13	May 26, 2015	978-4-04-103062-2	November 15, 2016	9781942993568
14	October 26, 2015	9784041030776	November 15, 2016	9781942993568
15	April 26, 2016	9784041030783	April 25, 2017	9781945054181
16	September 26, 2016	9784041046814	April 25, 2017	9781945054181

=== Anime ===
The opening theme song is "Tokyo Zero Hearts" (東京ゼロハーツ) performed by Faylan, while the ending theme is "Kyuusei Argyros" (救世Άργυρóϛ) by Yousei Teikoku.

==== Episodes ====
No.	Title	Original release date
1	"White Girl" "Shiroi Shōjo" (白い少女)	July 11, 2014
Tokyo has suddenly been taken over violently by espers. Amidst the destruction and terror as the metropolis of Tokyo falls, a name keeps surfacing. There is still hope. The White Girl will come to save the day.
2	"Girl Meets Boy" "Gāru Mītsu Bōi" (ガールミーツボーイ)	July 18, 2014
Urushiba Rinka suddenly finds herself in the apartment below her home, completely naked! Rinka meets a mysterious boy who seems to know her as she tries to recall what happened to her. All the while, new threats begin to appear..
3	"Penguin and Girl" "Pengin to Shōjo" (ペンギンと少女)	July 25, 2014
In order to find a way to return to normal, Rinka searches for the flying penguin with Kyotaro. She thinks about what it means to be a hero as she meets Murasaki and involves herself in various events. Has Rinka bitten off more than she can chew?
4	"The Rain, Ring, and Girl" "Ame to Yubiwa to Shōjo" (雨と指輪と少女)	August 1, 2014
Rinka decides to stand and fight back in order to rescue Murasaki. The enemy reveals herself to be Azuma's adoptive sister who had disappeared two years ago with her father. Big things may have been set in motion long before Rinka and Azuma realized.
5	"Meeting, Phantom and Girl" "Deai, Maboroshi to Shōjo" (出会い,幻と少女)	August 8, 2014
Rinka comes face to face with the Professor. He calls on her to join his crusade for a new world order and tells her of a miracle to come. Will Rinka respond to his invitation or ignore it completely? For what reason does she fight?
6	"Each Girl, Each Desire" "Sorezore no Shōjo, Sorezore no Omoi" (それぞれの少女, それぞれの思い)	August 15, 2014
Around Rinka, each girl is fighting and standing strong next to their own beliefs. As she struggles with the aftermath and the loss of Azuma, Rinka meets her father's old combat teacher. Now, Rinka must decide what she stands for to move forward.
7	"Girls in the Rain" "Ame no naka no shōjo-tachi" (雨の中の少女達)	August 22, 2014
Master Roshi introduces Ayumu, a curly haired young boy who hates women, to Rinka and Murasaki. Rinka must get stronger and defeat him in order to face off with Minami. Ayumu has his own problems, too. His mother is a politician who hates espers.
8	"Fruition, Girls Set into Motion" "Michiru toki, ugokidasu shōjo-tachi" (満ちる時, 動き出す少女達)	August 29, 2014
Summer is coming to a close and the day of battle is coming near. The city of Tokyo is working to go against the existence of espers and Kyotaro continues his efforts to escape. All the while, the Professor continues to gather powerful allies.
9	"Attack, ESP Girls" "Shūgeki esupu gāruzu" (襲撃・ESPガールズ)	September 5, 2014
With school back in session and Azuma-san back at her side, Rinka feels a momentary happiness. However, the Professor has other plans for them. Namely, a public execution of Rinka and Azuma, to crush any possible hope mankind may have imagined.
10	"In Bitter Lament..." "Dōkoku no naka de…" (慟哭のなかで…)	September 12, 2014
Rinka wanders the town, lost and broken. At the same time, Kyotaro desperately tries to get back to Tokyo and confirm Rinka's safety. Minami tells Kyotaro what really happened to her mother and his parents.
11	"Tokyo Girls War" "Tokyo Girls War"	September 19, 2014
Mass chaos ensues as the Professor takes over the parliament building. Though Rinka has lost her ESP powers, she still pushes forward to protect the people she treasures. Slowly, but surely, the White Girl and her crew gather for the ultimate battle!
12	"Tokyo ESP Girl" "Tōkyō ESP Shōjo" (東京ESP少女)	September 26, 2014
The great battle is reaching its climax as everyone hurries to save the parliament from imminent doom. However, the Professor's true target is elsewhere and may change Tokyo's future completely. Rinka must fight to protect everything dear to her!

=== Merchandise ===
Some of the merchandise being released by Kadokawa Shoten include phone cards, tumbles and drawings autographed by Segawa.

== China ban ==
On June 12, 2015, the Chinese Ministry of Culture listed Tokyo ESP among 38 anime and manga titles banned in China.
