= Necronomico and the Cosmic Horror Show =

Japanese anime television series

- Key visual

ネクロノミ子のコズミックホラーショウ (Nekuronomiko no Kozumikku Horā Shō)
- Created by: Cygames
- Anime television series
- Directed by: Masato Matsune
- Written by: Makoto Uezu
- Music by: Evan Call
- Studio: Studio Gokumi
- Licensed by: Crunchyroll
- Original network: Tokyo MX, Kansai TV, CBC, RKB, BS NTV
- Original run: July 1, 2025 – September 16, 2025
- Episodes: 12
- icon

Necronomico and the Cosmic Horror Show (ネクロノミ子のコズミックホラーショウ, Nekuronomiko no Kozumikku Horā Shō) is an original Japanese anime television series produced by Cygames and animated by Studio Gokumi. The series aired from July to September 2025.

== Plot ==
The series follows Miko Kurono, a junior high school student who streams under the name Necronomico. She becomes involved in a virtual reality game show hosted by a group of Cthulhu Mythos deities, which she explores along with her childhood friend Mayu Mayusaka and her rival Kanna Kagurazaka.

== Characters ==
Miko Kurono (黒廼 ミコ, Kurono Miko)
Voiced by: Riho Sugiyama
An influencer who talks about various topics. She aims to become more popular and go viral, and currently lives together with her close friend Mayu. After Mayu fell into a coma and upon seeing Cthulhu using Mayu's body for physical form, Miko vows to kill the Great Old Ones and bring Mayu back whatever it takes.
Mayu Mayusaka (舞夢坂 舞由, Mayusaka Mayu)
Voiced by: Manaka Iwami
An influencer known for her beauty, she focuses on cute things and currently lives with her close friend Miko. She falls into a coma, and her appearance is used by Cthulhu.
Kanna Kagurasaka (神楽坂 カンナ, Kagurasaka Kanna)
Voiced by: Nana Hazumi
A popular influencer with a tsundere personality who considers herself Miko's rival following a certain incident and mainly focuses on fashion. She also owns a Cavalier King Charles Spaniel named Daifuku, and later becomes friends with Miko as the series progresses. It is later revealed she had a troubled childhood where her father died and her stepfather abused her when she was 10 years old, forcing her to run away from home when she became a high schooler. After her story is exposed on the internet after the third VR game and her place of residence leaked, she is forced to move in with Miko to avoid attention from her fans and haters, while her SAN levels start deteriorating.
Eita (エイタ)
Voiced by: Reiji Kawashima
A gaming influencer and high schooler who is cheerful and considerate. He later turns out to be a egotistical psychopath favoring Hastur and the other Great Old Ones, leading Nao-kichi to be killed in the first VR game. He later kills his bully at the hospital by deliberately unplugging his life support, and after disappearing for a bit when that is revealed online during the third VR game, he joins the Great Old Ones' side as the Star-Eating Warrior, Aldebaran. When he fails to stop Miko, Kanna, Kei and Seishiro from losing the fourth VR game though, he loses his right eye by Tick-Tock. Before the fifth and final VR game begins, he starts raising a cultist mob in favor of Hastur.
Seishirō Sano (佐野清司郎, Sano Seishirō)
Voiced by: Atsushi Tamaru
A kindhearted influencer and math teacher. He has an ability to discern the truth behind people's actions.
Tsugumi Tsukasa (つかさ つぐみ, Tsukasa Tsugumi)
Voiced by: Hazuki Ogino
A disgraced actress who became a influencer after a scandalous corporate incident involving her was exposed and also went bankrupt and corrupt due to family debts. She later fails the second VR game alongside Hiroshi, becoming insane as a result.
NAO-KICHI
Voiced by: Taichi Ichikawa
A genius manga artist who participates in the VR game as a way to find inspiration for his next manga. He is killed within the first VR game after he is betrayed by Eita, and goes insane as a result.
Hiroshi Takashiro (鷹城 ヒロシ, Takashiro Hiroshi)
Voiced by: Kyōhei Natsume
An influencer who participates in the VR game. He later fails the second VR game alongside Tsugumi, becoming insane as a result.
Tick Tock Man (チクタクマン, Chiku Taku Man) / Nyarlathotep
Voiced by: Hiroki Yasumoto
An Outer God and a showmanly trickster who oversees the futuristic VR game Kadath.
Kei Amenomura (天叢 ケイ, Amenomura Kei)
Voiced by: Sayumi Watabe
The assistant director of the company behind the anime's VR game, serving as the bridge between the game master and the participants. She later participates in the games with Miko and the others.
Cthulhu (クトゥルフ, Kuturufu)
Voiced by: Manaka Iwami
A Great Old One who uses Mayu's appearance as a host, drawing Miko to vow vengeance for using Mayu's body while she is in a coma.
Hastur (ハスター, Hasutā)
Voiced by: Kazuyuki Okitsu
A Great Old One and a ruthless producer who values viewing numbers above streamers' wellbeing.
Ghatanothoa (ガタノソア, Gatanosoa)
Voiced by: Katsuyuki Konishi
A Great Old One who is a sadist who loves to quote lines from famous books.
Cthugha (グア, Gua)
Voiced by: Ayasa Itō
A Great Old One, who also happens to have a big appetite.
Zhar (ツァール, Tsāru)
Voiced by: Herself
A Great Old One who accompanies Hastur alongside Lloigor.
Lloigor (ロイガー, Roigā)
Voiced by: Herself
A Great Old One who accompanies Hastur alongside Zhar.
Hunter Joe (ハンターJOE, Hantā Jō)
Voiced by: Hiroaki Hirata
A mysterious person from the Vatican who is aware of the Great Old Ones' return.

== Production and release ==
The series was produced by Cygames and animated by Studio Gokumi. It was directed by Masato Matsune and features series composition by Makoto Uezu based on his story concepts, character designs by Hiroshi Kosuga based on Jirō Suzuki's original designs, and music composed by Evan Call. The series aired from July 1 to September 16, 2025, on Tokyo MX and other networks. The opening theme song is "Kakushō-ron" (確証論; "Theory of Confirmation"), performed by the VTuber Ryushen, while the ending theme song is "PANDORA feat. Noa (from Colorful Peach)" (PANDORA feat. のあ (from カラフルピーチ)) performed by Vell. Crunchyroll is streaming the series.

=== Episodes ===
No.	Title	Directed by	Written by	Storyboarded by	Original release date
1	"[No Spoilers!] Let's Play the Old Ones' Demo [Cthulhu]"; Transliteration: "【Shoken】Jashin Gēmu Taikenban Yattemita【Kuturufu】" (Japanese: 【初見】邪神ゲーム体験版やってみた【クトゥルフ】)	Yūsuke Tomita	Makoto Uezu	Masato Matsune & Kunihiro Mori	July 1, 2025
2	"[SAN Check] Small Streamers Collab! [Great Old Ones]"; Transliteration: "【Shōkido】Jaku Raibā de Atsumattemita【Kyū Shihai-sha】" (Japanese: 【正気度】弱ライバーで集まってみた【旧支配者】)	Ryoma Kawakami	Makoto Uezu	Yū Nobuta	July 8, 2025
3	"[PvE] Just Another Day at the Old Ones' Academy [Shoggoth]"; Transliteration: "【PvE】Tanoshii Jashin Gakuen【Shogosu】" (Japanese: 【PvE】たのしい邪神学園【ショゴス】)	Masanori Miyata	Makoto Uezu	Satoshi Shimizu	July 15, 2025
4	"[Puzzle Game] Welcome to Hotel Reversal [Escape Room]"; Transliteration: "【Nazotoki】Hoteru Ribāsaru e Yōkoso【Dasshutsu Gēmu】" (Japanese: 【謎解き】ホテルリバーサルへようこそ【脱出ゲーム】)	Ryoma Kawakami	Yasuko Aoki	Yū Nobuta	July 22, 2025
5	"[Up and Down] Is Humanity Quiz a Kusoge? [Stole 1 Mil]"; Transliteration: "【Appu Daun】 Kuizu Ningensei wa Hontō ni Kusogē ka? 【Yokodori Hyakuman】" (Japanese: 【アップダウン】クイズ人間性は本当にクソゲーか？【横取り100万】)	Hisashi Isogawa	Makoto Uezu	Hisashi Isogawa	July 29, 2025
6	"[Foodie] Summoned for a Day with the Old Ones [Ancient City]"; Transliteration: "【Gurume】 Ichinichi Fukkatsu Shita Jashin ni Yobidasarete Mita 【Koto】" (Japanese: 【グルメ】一日復活した邪神に呼び出されてみた【古都】)	Yūsuke Tomita	Makoto Uezu	Yūsuke Tomita	August 5, 2025
7	"[Old Awakening] Kyoto Tower Defense [Cthugha]"; Transliteration: "【Jashin Kakusei】Kessen! Kyōto Tawā Difensu【Kutogua】" (Japanese: 【邪神覚醒】決戦！京都タワーディフェンス【クトゥグア】)	Masanori Miyata	Masato Matsune	Satoshi Shimizu	August 12, 2025
8	"[Putting Out Fires] Miko and Kanna's TV Shot! [Top Cultist]"; Transliteration: "【Hikeshi】 Miko to Kanna de Terebi Shutsuen Shite Mita【Kyōso】" (Japanese: 【火消し】ミコとカンナでテレビ出演してみた【教祖】)	Hisashi Isogawa	Makoto Uezu	Yū Nobuta	August 19, 2025
9	"[Finals] Crying Out Family in the Mountains of Madness [Hastur]"; Transliteration: "【Kesshōsen】 Kyōki Sanmyaku nite, Kazokuai o Sakebu【Hasutā】" (Japanese: 【決勝戦】狂気山脈にて、家族愛を叫ぶ【ハスター】)	Ryoma Kawakami	Yasuko Aoki	Hiroyuki Hashimoto	August 26, 2025
10	"[Raising Sim] I Made Me, and It's Got My Heart Thumping [Ghatanothoa]"; Transliteration: "【Ikusei】Jibun Mēkā de Tokimeite Mita【Gatanosoa】" (Japanese: 【育成】自分メーカーでときめいてみた【ガタノソア】)	Hodaka Kuramoto	Yasuko Aoki	Shinpei Nagai	September 2, 2025
11	"[R'lyeh] Return from the Unlighted Chambers [Cthulhu]"; Transliteration: "【Rurue】Mumyō no Keibō kara no Kikan【Kuturufu】" (Japanese: 【ルルイエ】無明の閨房からの帰還【クトゥルフ】)	Hisashi Isogawa	Makoto Uezu	Hideki Tonokatsu	September 9, 2025
12	"[The End?] The Call of Necronomico [Fin?]"; Transliteration: "【Owari?】Nekuronomiko no Yobigoe 【Kan?】" (Japanese: 【終？】ネクロノミ子の呼び声【完？】)	Ryoma Kawakami	Makoto Uezu	Yū Nobuta	September 16, 2025

== Reception ==
=== AI subtitling controversy ===
Anime News Network noted that the series' official English subtitles had numerous translation errors, and in one line of the German subtitle script, it contained the phrase "ChatGPT said:" prefixing the dialogue, suggesting that ChatGPT had been used to produce the subtitles. Rebecca Silverman criticized the use of ChatGPT in the subtitling, describing the result as "nowhere near acceptable for a professional product". Crunchyroll responded on July 3, 2025, saying that the use of AI for the subtitles violated agreements with the third-party vendor who had supplied them, and that they were working to resolve the issue.
