= Walkin' in My Lane =

- Digital and regular version cover

Single by Milet

from the album 5am
- Language: Japanese; English
- B-side: "Love When I Cry" "My Dreams Are Made of Hell"
- Released: May 25, 2022
- Length: 4:00
- Label: SME
- Songwriters: Milet; Ryosuke "Dr. R" Sakai
- Producer: Sakai

Milet singles chronology
"Omokage" (2021)	"Walkin' in My Lane" (2022)	"Always You" (2022)

Music video
- "Walkin' in My Lane" on YouTube

"Walkin' in My Lane" is a song recorded by Japanese singer Milet, released May 25, 2022, by SME Records. The song served as the theme song for Japanese drama Involvement in Family Affairs and was Milet's first CD single. Upon its release, "Walkin' in My Lane" peaked at number 25 on the Billboard Japan Hot 100 and number ten on the Oricon Singles Chart.

== Background ==
Milet has previously released multiple promotional singles and various digital singles, an uncommon move in Japan as physical CD copies are the most popular music format in the country. In April 2022, SME announced Milet's song "Walkin' in My Lane" would be pre-released digitally and that the song would be used in the Japanese drama Involvement in Family Affairs. The song was later released to digital stores on April 29. A physical CD single was announced additionally for release on May 25. Additionally, a limited version type A and B with a bonus DVD was announced for physical copies. Two B-side songs "Love When I Cry" and "My Dreams Are Made of Hell" were included on both physical and digital copies.

== Commercial performance ==
“Walkin' in My Lane" debuted at number 54 on the Billboard Japan Hot 100 for the week of May 18, 2022. Upon its CD single release, the song peaked at number 25 for the week of June 1. On the Oricon Digital Singles Chart, "Walkin' in My Lane" debuted and peaked at number 6. The physical release of "Walkin' in My Lane" debuted at number ten on the Oricon Singles Chart.

== Track listing ==
"Walkin' in My Lane" – Digital pre-release version
No.	Title	Writer(s)	Producer(s)	Length
1.	"Walkin' in My Lane"	Milet; Ryosuke "Dr. R" Sakai	Sakai	4:00
Total length:				4:00

"Walkin' in My Lane" – Regular/digital edition
No.	Title	Writer(s)	Producer(s)	Length
1.	"Walkin' in My Lane"	Milet; Sakai	Sakai	4:00
2.	"Love When I Cry"	Milet; Tomolow	Tomolow	3:28
3.	"My Dreams Are Made of Hell"	Milet; Sakai	Sakai	3:49
Total length:				11:19

"Walkin' in My Lane" – Limited edition DVD live performances from the Seventh Heaven tour
No.	Title	Length
1.	"Again and Again"
2.	"Diving Board"
3.	"Koukaizenya" (航海前夜)
4.	"Who I Am"
5.	"Inside You"
6.	"Dome"
7.	"Fire Arrow"
8.	"Waterfall"
9.	"Checkmate"
10.	"One Touch"
11.	"Wake Me Up"
12.	"Prover"
13.	"Somebody" (Acoustic session)
14.	"On the Edge"
15.	"Us"
16.	"Fine Line"
17.	"You & I"
18.	"Ordinary Days" (EC)
19.	"The Love We've Made" (EC)
20.	"Grab the Air" (EC)

== Personnel ==
Credits adapted from the CD liner notes of 5am

- milet - songwriter
- Ryosuke"Dr.R"Sakai - songwriter, producer, mixing engineer, mastering engineer

== Charts ==
Chart performance for "Walkin' in My Lane"
Chart (2022)	Peak position
Japan (Japan Hot 100)	25
Japan (Oricon)	10

== Release history ==
Release history and formats for "Walkin' in My Lane"
Region	Date	Format(s)	Version	Label	Ref.
Various	April 29, 2022	Digital download; streaming	Digital pre-release	SME	
Various	May 25, 2022	Digital download; streaming	Regular	SME	
Japan	May 25, 2022	Digital download; streaming; CD	Regular	SME	
Japan	May 25, 2022	CD; DVD	Limited type A	SME	
Japan	May 25, 2022	CD; Blu-ray	Limited type B	SME	
