= Omokage =

2021 single by Milet, Aimer and Lilas Ikuta

Single by Milet, Aimer and Lilas Ikuta
- Language: Japanese; English
- Released: December 17, 2021
- Genre: J-pop
- Length: 3:08
- Label: The First Take
- Songwriter: Vaundy
- Producer: Vaundy

Milet singles chronology
"Checkmate" (2021)	"Omokage" (2021)	"Walkin' in My Lane" (2022)

Aimer singles chronology
"Grace Note" (2021)	"Omokage" (2021)	"Zankyōsanka" (2021)

Lilas Ikuta singles chronology
"Hōseki" (2021)	"Omokage" (2021)	"Sparkle" (2022)

Live performance video
- "Omokage" on YouTube

"Omokage" (おもかげ; lit. "vestige") is a song by Japanese singer-songwriters Milet, Aimer, and Lilas Ikuta. It was released on December 17, 2021, as YouTube channel The First Take's second collaboration project after Lisa and Uru's "Saikai". Written and produced by Vaundy, the song expresses the good feeling of facing yourself and the people.

The song accompanied Sony's Wireless noise-canceling earphones WF-1000XM4 advertisement, starring the singers and first launched on November 4. The live performance on The First Take channel premiered on the same day as the release date. Vaundy's self-cover version of "Omokage" was included in his first EP Hadaka no Yūsha (2022). The singers and Vaundy gave a televised debut performance of the song at 73rd NHK Kōhaku Uta Gassen on December 31, 2022.

== Charts ==
=== Weekly charts ===
Weekly chart performance for "Omokage"
Chart (2021–2023)	Peak position
Global Excl. U.S (Billboard)	190
Japan Combined Singles (Oricon)	27
Japan Hot 100 (Billboard)	11

=== Year-end charts ===
Year-end chart performance for "Omokage"
Chart (2022)	Position
Japan Hot 100 (Billboard)	94

== Certifications ==
Certifications for "Omokage"
Region	Certification	Certified units/sales
Streaming
Japan (RIAJ)	Platinum	100,000,000^{†}
^{†} Streaming-only figures based on certification alone.

== Release history ==
Release dates and formats for "Omokage"
Region	Date	Format	Label	Ref.
Various	December 17, 2021	Digital download; streaming	The First Take	
