= Sunny (Milet song) =

2026 single by Milet

- Digital cover

Single by Milet

from the album Made of Glass
- Language: Japanese
- Released: September 2, 2026
- Length: 3:34
- Label: SME
- Songwriters: Milet; Yōichirō Nomura
- Producer: Yōichirō Nomura

Milet singles chronology
"The Story of Us" (2026)	"Sunny" (2026)

Music video
- "Sunny" on YouTube

"Sunny" is a song recorded by Japanese singer Milet. Released digitally on July 12, 2026, it was later physically released on September 2, 2026, via SME Records. Used as the opening theme song for the anime adaption of the Japanese light novel Though I Am an Inept Villainess, "Sunny" serves as the fifth single from Milet's studio album, Made of Glass.

== Background and release ==
In a press release on June 9, 2026, Milet announced the release of a new song "Sunny". Serving as the opening theme song for the anime Though I Am an Inept Villainess, "Sunny" follows Milet's previous single, "The Story of Us", released earlier in 2026, which served as the ending theme song for the second season of Frieren: Beyond Journey's End. On June 16, SME Records announced "Sunny" would be included on Milet's fourth studio album, Made of Glass.

"Sunny" was released on July 12, 2026, as a digital single. A physical maxi single was released on September 2, 2026. The maxi single includes a bonus Blu-ray disc containing the music video for "Sunny" and a non-credit version of the opening scene from Though I Am an Inept Villainess.

== Music video ==
A music video for "Sunny" premiered on Milet's YouTube channel on July 12. Directed by QQQ under the creative production company Nobodcr, the video features Milet singing around various parachutes and mirrors.

== Track listing ==
- CD
1. "Sunny"
2. "Sunny" (A.Gt session)
3. "Sunny" (anime size)
4. "Sunny" (instrumental)
- Blu-ray
1. "Sunny" (music video)
2. "Though I Am an Inept Villainess: Opening Video" (non-credit version)

== Personnel ==
- Milet – lead vocals
- Yōichirō Nomura – acoustic guitar, arrangement, mixing

== Charts ==
Chart performance for "Sunny"
Chart (2026)	Peak position
Japan (Oricon)	31
Japan Anime Singles (Oricon)	10
Japan Digital Singles (Oricon)	24
Japan Download Songs (Billboard Japan)	23
Japan Top Singles Sales (Billboard Japan)	30

== Release history ==
Release history and formats for "Sunny"
Region	Date	Format(s)	Version	Label	Ref.
Various	July 12, 2026	Digital download; streaming	Digital	SME	
Japan	September 2, 2026	CD; Blu-ray	Maxi single	SME	
