= Taichi Ichikawa =

Japanese voice actor

- 市川 太一
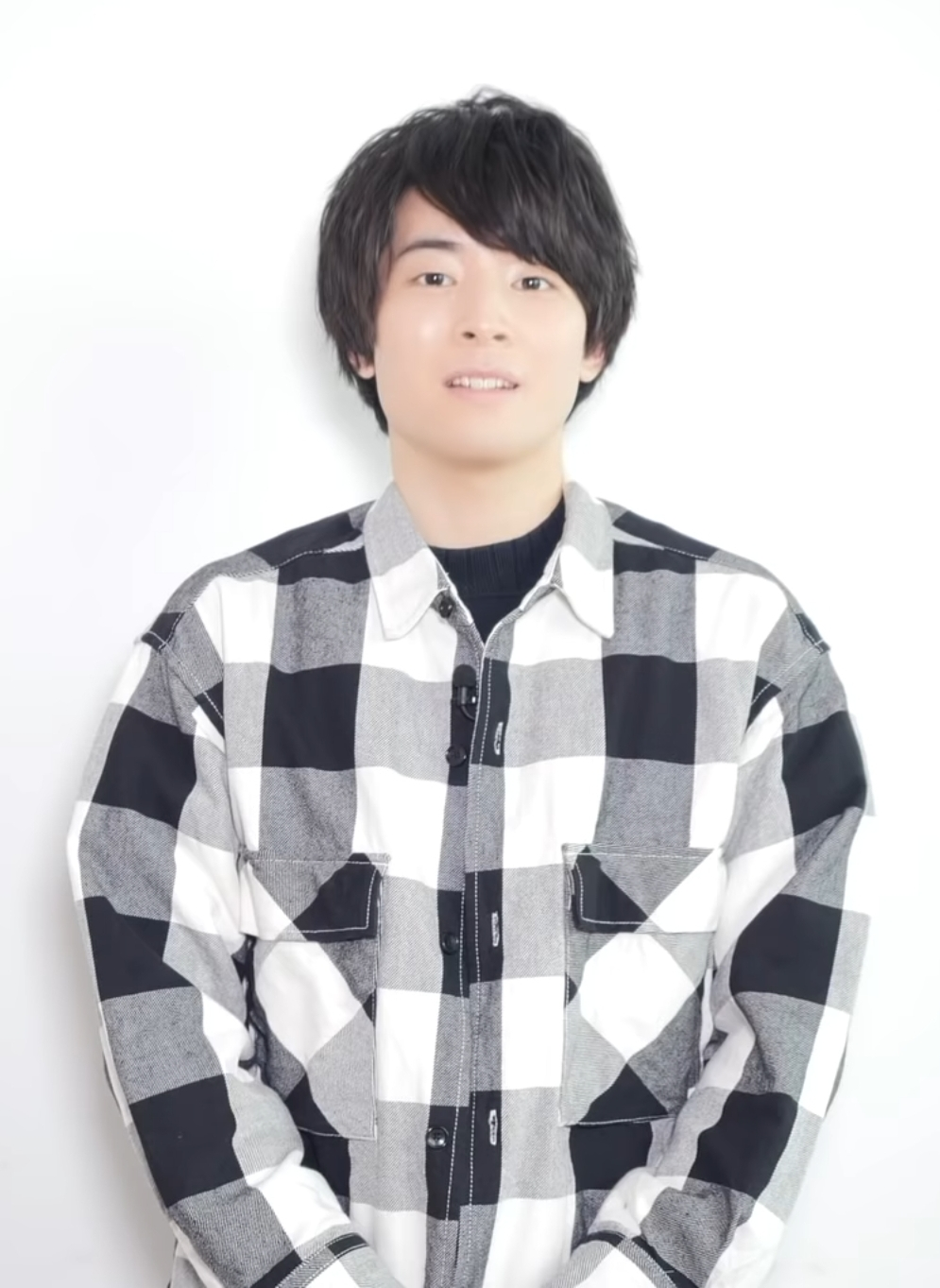
- Ichikawa in 2019
- Born: February 4, 1993 (age 33); Tokyo, Japan
- Occupation: Voice actor
- Years active: 2015–present
- Agent: VIMS
- Notable credits: Kabukibu! as Kurogo Kurusu; Tower of God as Twenty-Fifth Bam; World's End Harem as Reito Mizuhara

Taichi Ichikawa (Japanese: 市川太一, Hepburn: Ichikawa Taichi; born February 4, 1993) is a Japanese voice actor affiliated with VIMS. After realizing the potential of voice acting by listening to radio shows, Ichikawa was inspired to enter vocational school and become a voice actor. Some of his noteworthy roles include Kurogo Kurusu in Kabukibu!, Twenty-Fifth Bam in Tower of God, and Reito Mizuhara in World's End Harem.

== Biography ==
Taichi Ichikawa was born in Tokyo on February 4. In high school, Ichikawa was a fan of a radio show by Showtaro Morikubo, where Ichikawa became impressed with the possibilities of voice acting. While in university, he managed to save up enough money to attend vocational school afterwards. There, voice actor Jun Fukushima taught him how to properly voice act in series. He later began voice acting professionally in 2015 with additional voices in Aoharu × Machinegun.

== Filmography ==
=== Anime ===
2017

- Kabukibu! as Kurogo Kurusu

2018

- Major 2nd as Hayato Urabe
- Bloom Into You as Seiji Maki

2019

- Vinland Saga as Anne's Siblings

2020

- From Argonavis as Kanata Nijō
- Tower of God as Twenty-Fifth Bam

2021

- Horimiya as High School Boys
- World's End Harem as Reito Mizuhara

2024

- Alya Sometimes Hides Her Feelings in Russian as Hikaru Kiyomiya
- Is It Wrong to Try to Pick Up Girls in a Dungeon? V as the Gulliver Brothers
- Loner Life in Another World as Nerd B

2025

- Necronomico and the Cosmic Horror Show as Nao-Kichi

=== Video games ===
2022

- Trinity Trigger as Cyan
- Dream Meister and the Recollected Black Fairy as Searle
