= Koi Kogare =

- Standard cover

Single by Milet and Man with a Mission

from the album 5am
- Language: Japanese; English
- A-side: "Kizuna no Kiseki"
- Released: May 31, 2023
- Genre: Rock
- Length: 3:36
- Label: SME; Sony Records
- Songwriter: Yuki Kajiura
- Producers: Kajiura; Man with a Mission

Milet singles chronology
"Final Call" (2022)	"Koi Kogare" / "Kizuna no Kiseki" (2023)	"Anytime Anywhere" (2023)

Man with a Mission singles chronology
"Merry-Go-Round" (2021)	"Koi Kogare" / "Kizuna no Kiseki" (2023)	"The Road of Victory" (2024)

Music video
- "Koi Kogare" on YouTube

"Koi Kogare" (コイコガレ; lit. 'Yearning') is a song recorded by Japanese singer Milet and Japanese rock band Man with a Mission. Originally released on April 17, 2023, by SME Records and Sony Records, "Koi Kogare" served as the closing theme song for the third season of Demon Slayer: Kimetsu no Yaiba. The song was included on Milet's third studio album 5am.

== Background and release ==
Man with a Mission and Milet released "Kizuna no Kiseki", the opening theme song for the third season of Demon Slayer: Kimetsu no Yaiba, on April 10, 2023. On April 17, Sony Japan released "Koi Kogare", the closing theme song for the anime which also is sung by Milet and Man with a Mission. Within that same day, a maxi single CD was announced for release on May 31. Sony Japan later announced a limited vinyl version of the release. The full 6-track maxi single was released on May 31, 2023.

== Music video ==
A music video for "Koi Kogare" premiered on YouTube on April 23, 2023, on Milet's official channel.

== Live performances ==
Milet performed "Koi Kogare" at Nippon Budokan in May. Man with a Mission was unable to perform live, however their studio vocals were used.

== Track listing ==
Regular and limited edition – CD
No.	Title	Writer(s)	Length
1.	"Kizuna no Kiseki" (絆ノ奇跡)	Jean-Ken Johnny	3:43
2.	"Koi Kogare" (コイコガレ)	Yuki Kajiura	3:36
3.	"Kizuna no Kiseki" (Instrumental)		3:43
4.	"Koi Kogare" (Instrumental)		3:36
5.	"Kizuna no Kiseki" (TV version)	Johnny	1:34
6.	"Koi Kogare" (TV version)	Kajiura	1:30
Total length:			17:42

Limited edition – DVD
No.	Title	Director(s)	Length
1.	"Kizuna no Kiseki" (music video)	Yasuhiro Arafune	3:44
2.	"Koi Kogare" (music video)		3:44

Limited Anime edition – DVD
No.	Title	Length
1.	"Demon Slayer: Kimetsu no Yaiba – Swordsmith Village Arc Opening Video" (non-credit version)
2.	"Demon Slayer: Kimetsu no Yaiba – Swordsmith Village Arc Ending Video" (non-credit version)

== Accolades ==
Awards and nominations for "Koi Kogare"
Ceremony	Year	Award	Result	Ref.
8th Crunchyroll Anime Awards	2024	Best Ending Sequence	Nominated	

== Charts ==
=== Weekly charts ===
Weekly chart performance for "Koi Kogare"
Chart (2023)	Peak position
Japan (Japan Hot 100)	25
Japan Hot Animation (Billboard Japan)	8
Japan (Oricon) with "Kizuna no Kiseki"	4
Japan Combined Singles (Oricon) with "Kizuna no Kiseki"	3
Japan Anime Singles (Oricon) with "Kizuna no Kiseki"	1

=== Monthly charts ===
Monthly chart performance for "Koi Kogare"
Chart (2023)	Position
Japan (Oricon) with "Kizuna no Kiseki"	6
Japan Anime Singles (Oricon) with "Kizuna no Kiseki"	1

=== Year-end charts ===
Year-end chart performance for "Koi Kogare"
Chart (2023)	Position
Japan Download Songs (Billboard Japan)	19
Japan Top Singles Sales (Billboard Japan) with "Kizuna no Kiseki"	91
Japan (Oricon) with "Kizuna no Kiseki"	83

== Certifications ==
Certifications for "Koi Kogare"
Region	Certification	Certified units/sales
Japan (RIAJ) Digital	Gold	100,000^{*}
^{*} Sales figures based on certification alone.

== Release history ==
Release history and formats for "Koi Kogare"
Region	Date	Format(s)	Version	Label	Ref.
Various	April 17, 2023	Digital download; streaming	Digital pre-release	Sony	
Various	May 31, 2023	Digital download; streaming	Digital EP	Sony	
Japan	May 31, 2023	CD	Regular	Sony	
Japan	May 31, 2023	CD; DVD	Limited	Sony	
Japan	May 31, 2023	CD; DVD	Limited anime	Sony	
Japan	May 31, 2023	Vinyl	Limited	Sony	
