= Kizuna no Kiseki =

- Standard cover

Single by Man with a Mission and Milet
- Language: Japanese
- A-side: "Koi Kogare"
- Released: May 31, 2023
- Genre: Rock
- Length: 3:43
- Label: Sony
- Songwriter: Jean-Ken Johnny
- Producer: Man with a Mission

Man with a Mission singles chronology
"Merry-Go-Round" (2021)	"Kizuna no Kiseki" / "Koi Kogare" (2023)	"The Road of Victory" (2024)

Milet singles chronology
"Final Call" (2022)	"Kizuna no Kiseki" / "Koi Kogare" (2023)	"Anytime Anywhere" (2023)

Music video
- "Kizuna no Kiseki" on YouTube

"Kizuna no Kiseki" (Japanese: 絆ノ奇跡; lit. 'Miracle of Bonds') is a song recorded by Japanese rock band Man with a Mission and Japanese singer Milet. Originally released on April 10, 2023, by Sony Records, "Kizuna no Kiseki" served as the opening theme song for the third season of Demon Slayer: Kimetsu no Yaiba.

Upon its release, "Kizuna no Kiseki" was a commercial success in Japan, peaking at number 2 on the Billboard Japan Hot 100 and peaking at number 4 on the Oricon Singles Chart alongside its A-side, "Koi Kogare".

== Background and release ==
Man with a Mission and Milet have previously collaborated in 2019 with the song "Reiwa" from Man with a Mission's 2019 studio album Dark Crow.

In February 2023 during a special stream, the opening song for the third season of Demon Slayer: Kimetsu no Yaiba was revealed. On Twitter, the official account of Demon Slayer announced Man with a Mission and Milet would provide the song.

On April 10, "Kizuna no Kiseki" was released to digital stores. Subsequently, a music video for the song was released and a maxi single CD was announced for release on May 31. Sony Japan later announced a limited vinyl version of the release. The full 6-track maxi single was released on May 31, 2023.

== Music video ==
A music video for "Kizuna no Kieski" was released on April 17, 2023. Directed by Yasuhiro Arafune, the music video primarily takes place atop the Tokyo Tower.

== Live performances ==
Milet performed "Kizuna no Kiseki" at Nippon Budokan in May. Man with a Mission was unable to perform live, however their studio vocals were used. In June, Man with a Mission and Milet performed the song on the Japanese YouTube channel The First Take.

== Track listing ==
Regular and limited edition – CD
No.	Title	Writer(s)	Length
1.	"Kizuna no Kiseki" (絆ノ奇跡)	Jean-Ken Johnny	3:43
2.	"Koi Kogare" (コイコガレ)	Yuki Kajiura	3:36
3.	"Kizuna no Kiseki" (Instrumental)		3:43
4.	"Koi Kogare" (Instrumental)		3:36
5.	"Kizuna no Kiseki" (TV version)	Johnny	1:34
6.	"Koi Kogare" (TV version)	Kajiura	1:30
Total length:			17:42

Limited edition – DVD
No.	Title	Director(s)	Length
1.	"Kizuna no Kiseki" (music video)	Yasuhiro Arafune	3:44
2.	"Koi Kogare" (music video)		3:44

Limited Anime edition – DVD
No.	Title	Length
1.	"Demon Slayer: Kimetsu no Yaiba – Swordsmith Village Arc Opening Video" (non-credit version)
2.	"Demon Slayer: Kimetsu no Yaiba – Swordsmith Village Arc Ending Video" (non-credit version)

== Accolades ==
Awards and nominations for "Kizuna no Kiseki"
Ceremony	Year	Award	Result	Ref.
13th Newtype Anime Awards	2023	Best Theme Song	Nominated	
38th Japan Gold Disc Awards	2024	Best 3 Songs by Download	Won	

== Charts ==
=== Weekly charts ===
Weekly chart performance for "Kizuna no Kiseki"
Chart (2023)	Peak position
Global 200 (Billboard)	140
Japan Hot 100 (Billboard)	2
Japan Hot Animation (Billboard Japan)	2
Japan (Oricon) with "Koi Kogare"	4
Japan Combined Singles (Oricon) with "Koi Kogare"	3
Japan Anime Singles (Oricon) with "Koi Kogare"	1
US World Digital Song Sales (Billboard)	11

=== Monthly charts ===
Monthly chart performance for "Kizuna no Kiseki"
Chart (2023)	Position
Japan (Oricon) with "Koi Kogare"	6
Japan Anime Singles (Oricon) with "Koi Kogare"	1

=== Year-end charts ===
2023 year-end chart performance for "Kizuna no Kiseki"
Chart (2023)	Position
Japan (Japan Hot 100)	18
Japan Hot Animation (Billboard Japan)	8
Japan (Oricon) with "Koi Kogare"	83
Japan Digital Singles (Oricon)	3

2024 year-end chart performance for "Kizuna no Kiseki"
Chart (2024)	Position
Japan (Japan Hot 100)	87

== Certifications ==
Certifications for "Kizuna no Kiseki"
Region	Certification	Certified units/sales
Japan (RIAJ) Digital	Platinum	250,000^{*}
Streaming
Japan (RIAJ)	2× Platinum	200,000,000^{†}
^{*} Sales figures based on certification alone.^{†} Streaming-only figures based on certification alone.

== Release history ==
Release history and formats for "Kizuna no Kiseki"
Region	Date	Format(s)	Version	Label	Ref.
Various	April 10, 2023	Digital download; streaming	Digital pre-release	Sony	
Various	May 31, 2023	Digital download; streaming	Digital EP	Sony	
Japan	May 31, 2023	CD	Regular	Sony	
Japan	May 31, 2023	CD; DVD	Limited	Sony	
Japan	May 31, 2023	CD; DVD	Limited anime	Sony	
Japan	May 31, 2023	Vinyl	Limited	Sony	
