= Evan Call =

American composer (born 1988)

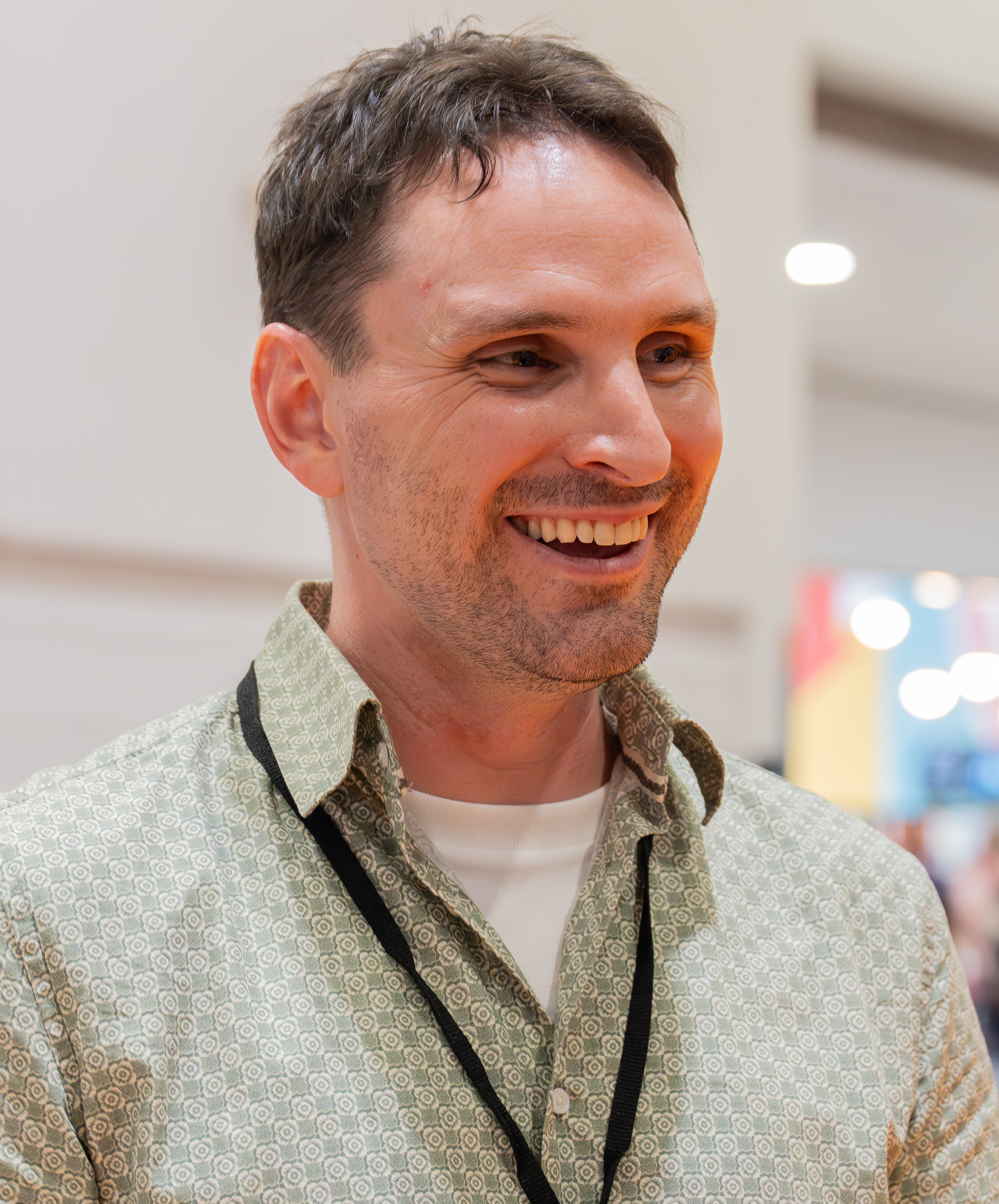
- Call in 2026

Background information
- Born: June 29, 1988 (age 38); California, U.S.
- Genres: BGM; J-pop; anison
- Occupations: Composer; arranger
- Instrument: Guitar
- Years active: 2012–present
- Member of: Miracle Bus (2017–present)
- Formerly of: Elements Garden (2012–2016)

Evan Call (born June 29, 1988) is an American composer and arranger working in Japan. He has composed music for multiple anime series, such as Violet Evergarden, Muv-Luv Alternative and Frieren: Beyond Journey's End. Call is affiliated with the Japanese agency Miracle Bus and was previously a member of the musical group Elements Garden.

== Biography ==
Call was born in California, U.S., on June 29, 1988, and grew up in the city of Lincoln. As a teenager, Call was diagnosed with occipital neuralgia and had to take a break from going to school. During that time, he learned to play bluegrass guitar from a local teacher. Call later made a friend in his hometown who taught him about Japanese anime and video games, which prompted him to start composing orchestral music. He joined the choir club when he entered high school. After graduating, Call enrolled at the Berklee College of Music, where he majored in film scoring.

After graduating from college, he debated if he should pursue a career in film music in Hollywood. In the end, he decided to move to Japan on a tourist visa to work in the anime and game industry. Three months after his arrival, he was introduced to Junpei Fujita, a music creator working at Elements Garden. After an interview with Fujita and a review of his music portfolio, Call joined Elements Garden. He began composing music in Japan in 2012, where he gained attention for his grand arrangements and impressive symphonic music. After his employment, Call was introduced to Yōta Tsuruoka, a sound director at Kyoto Animation. Alongside Tsuruoka, Call began composing the soundtracks for the anime series Tokyo ESP and Violet Evergarden. Call would continue to compose soundtracks for other anime series and films such as Josee, the Tiger and the Fish. In 2025, Call won a Tokyo Anime Award in the Sound/Performance category, and was nominated for Best Score at the 9th Crunchyroll Anime Awards for his work on Frieren: Beyond Journey's End.

Call left Elements Garden on June 30, 2016, due to his contract expiring. Since 2017, he has been a member of the Japanese agency Miracle Bus.

== Musical style and influences ==
Call's musical style is primarily orchestral, often blending classical instrumentation and scoring with European folk elements. This influence is particularly evident in his work on Frieren: Beyond Journey's End, where he incorporated traditional instrumentation inspired by an early experience hearing folk music performed with instruments such as the psaltery and hammered dulcimer, which he described as sounding "like magic". He also cited the American folk song "Oh Shenandoah" as an inspiration for its nostalgic, "coming home" feeling, which he reflects in his compositions.

== Works ==
=== Anime ===
Year	Title	Notes	Ref.
2013	Symphogear G	With Junpei Fujita, Noriyasu Agematsu, and Hitoshi Fujima	
2014	When Supernatural Battles Became Commonplace	With Junpei Fujita and Haruki Mori	
2014	Kamigami no Asobi	With Junpei Fujita and Hitoshi Fujima	
2014	Tokyo ESP		
2015	Tantei Kageki Milky Holmes TD	With Daisuke Kikuta, Haruki Mori, and Tomohiro Kita	
2015	Symphogear GX	With Junpei Fujita and Hitoshi Fujima	
2015	Dance with Devils	With Junpei Fujita	
2016	Schwarzesmarken		
2016	Big Order		
2016	Aokana: Four Rhythm Across the Blue	With Junpei Fujita and Seima Iwahashi	
2017	Chronos Ruler		
2018	Hakumei and Mikochi		
2018	Violet Evergarden		
2019	YU-NO: A Girl Who Chants Love at the Bound of this World	With Keishi Yonao, Ryū Takami, and Ryū Kawamura	
2019	Midnight Occult Civil Servants		
2020	Appare-Ranman!		
2021	Muv-Luv Alternative		
2021	The Night Beyond the Tricornered Window		
2022	Muv-Luv Alternative (season 2)		
2023	My Happy Marriage		
2023	Frieren: Beyond Journey's End	#77 in the German Album Charts	
2024	Sengoku Youko		
2025	My Happy Marriage (season 2)		
2025	Pokémon: Dragonite and the Special Delivery		
2025	Gundam: Next Universal Century		
2025	Hell Teacher: Jigoku Sensei Nube		
2025	Necronomico and the Cosmic Horror Show		
2026	Frieren: Beyond Journey's End (season 2)		
2027	The Record of a Fallen Vampire		

=== Anime films ===
Year	Title	Notes	Ref.
2014	Bodacious Space Pirates: Abyss of Hyperspace	With Noriyasu Agematsu, Junpei Fujita, and Hitoshi Fujima	
2016	Tantei Opera Milky Holmes the Movie: Milky Holmes' Counterattack	With Seima Iwahashi	
2019	Violet Evergarden: Eternity and the Auto Memory Doll		
2020	Violet Evergarden: The Movie		
2020	Josee, the Tiger and the Fish		
2023	Gold Kingdom and Water Kingdom		

=== Video games ===
Year	Title	Notes	Ref.
2014	Chaos Rings III	Arrangement with Junpei Fujita and Hitoshi Fujima	
2014	Shining Resonance	With Junpei Fujita, Hitoshi Fujima, and Tomohiro Kita	
2015	Chronos Ring	With Yoko Shimomura and Kenji Ito	

=== Television dramas ===
Year	Title	Notes	Ref.
2017	Star Concerto: Ore to Kimi no Idol Dō		
2017	Sayonara, Enari-kun		
2017	Keishichō Ikimono Gakari	With Audio Highs	
2018	Holiday Love	With Masaru Yokoyama	
2018	Daisy Luck	With Moe Hyuga	
2018	Harassment Game		
2018	Iyo! Benkei		
2019	Keiji Zero	With Masaru Yokoyama	
2019	Hotarugusa: Nana no Ken		
2022	The 13 Lords of the Shogun	Taiga drama	
2024	Swallows		

=== Live-action films ===
Year	Title	Ref.
2019	Until I Meet September's Love	

=== Television programs ===
Year	Title	Ref.
2018	Weekend Kansai	
2019	NHK Special Dinosaur Superworld	
2020	NHK Sunday/Saturday Sports	

=== Other involvements ===
Year	Title	Artist	Role(s)	Album	Ref.
2012	"Avalon no Ōkan"	Nana Mizuki	Arrangements	Rockbound Neighbors	
2013	"Neverending Dream"	Minori Chihara	Composition & arrangements	Neo Fantasia	
2014	"Ai no Hi"	Ayahi Takagaki	Composition & arrangements	Non-album single	
2014	"Aurora"	Tomoaki Maeno (as Camus)	Composition & arrangements	Non-album single (Uta no Prince-sama)	
2014	"Tenka Muteki no Shinobi Michi"	Takuma Terashima (as Otoya Ittoki); Kenichi Suzumura (as Masato Hijirikawa); Hiro Shimono (as Shō Kurusu); Kohsuke Toriumi (as Cecil Aijima)	Arrangements	Non-album single (Uta no Prince-sama)	
2014	"Yasashisa no Tsubomi"	Faylan	Arrangements	Zero Hearts	
2014	"Meisō Solitude"	Kato*Fuku	Arrangements, with Seima Iwahashi	With	
2015	"Arigatō, Daisuki"	Minori Chihara	Arrangements	Innocent Age	
2015	"Pirates of the Frontier"	Tatsuhisa Suzuki (as Ranmaru Kurosaki); Tomoaki Maeno (as Camus); Takuma Terashima (as Otoya Ittoki)	Arrangements	Non-album single (Uta no Prince-sama)	
2015	"Saintly Territory"	Tomoaki Maeno (as Camus)	Arrangements	Non-album single (Uta no Prince-sama)	
2015	"Seien Brave Heart"	Kenichi Suzumura (as Masato Hijirikawa)	Composition & arrangements	Non-album single (Uta no Prince-sama)	
2015	"Tenshi no Inori"	Shouta Aoi	Composition & arrangements	Unlimited	
2015	"Alice to Toki no Yurikago"	Kato*Fuku	Composition & arrangements	Wonder Tale: Smile to Happiness to Fushigi na Hon	
2015	"Tsunagareta Asa ni"	Kato*Fuku	Composition & arrangements	Wonder Tale: Smile to Happiness to Fushigi na Hon	
2016	"Lovely Eyes"	Junichi Suwabe (as Ren Jingūji); Hidenori Takahashi (as Van Kiryūin)	Arrangements	Non-album single (Uta no Prince-sama)	
2016	"Give Me Your Heart: Mayoeru Kohitsuji"	Hiroshi Kamiya (as Balder Hringhorni); Yoshimasa Hosoya (as Loki Laevatein)	Composition & arrangements	Non-album single (Kamigami no Asobi InFinite)	
2017	"Akane-iro ni Kakushite"	Ayane Sakura (as Hikari Tsuneki)	Composition & arrangements	Non-album single (Seiren)	
2017	"Muteki no Megami"	Shino Shimoji (as Tōru Miyamae)	Composition & arrangements	Non-album single (Seiren)	
2017	"Koi no Theory"	Juri Kimura (as Kyōko Tōno)	Arrangements	Non-album single (Seiren)	
2018	"Union!!"	765 Million Allstars	Arrangements	Non-album single (The Idolmaster Million Live!)	
2018	"Sincerely"	True	Arrangements, with Shōta Horie	Violet Evergarden: Automemories; Violet Evergarden Vocal Album: Song Letters	
2018	"The Songstress Aria"	True	Composition, arrangements & lyrics	Violet Evergarden: Automemories; Violet Evergarden Vocal Album: Song Letters	
2018	"Letter"	True	Arrangements	Violet Evergarden: Automemories; Violet Evergarden Vocal Album: Song Letters	
2018	"Believe in..."	Aira Yūki	Composition & arrangements	Violet Evergarden: Automemories; Violet Evergarden Vocal Album: Song Letters	
2020	"Will (Movie Version)"	True	Composition & arrangements	Violet Evergarden: Echo Through Eternity	
2020	"Mirai no Hito e (Movie Version)"	True	Arrangements	Violet Evergarden: Echo Through Eternity	
2020	"Michishirube (Movie Version)"	Minori Chihara	Arrangements	Violet Evergarden: Echo Through Eternity	
2020	"Dear Violet"	Yui Ishikawa	Composition & arrangements	Letters and Doll: Looking Back on the Memories of Violet Evergarden	
2020	"Jōjō"	Nino	Composition & arrangements	Synapusyu Songs	
2021	"Makka Akka Aki"	Kyogo Kawaguchi	Composition & arrangements	Synapusyu Songs 2	
2021	"Breakers"	Wataru Hatano	Composition & arrangements	Non-album single (The Night Beyond the Tricornered Window)	
2023	"Anytime Anywhere"	Milet	Arrangements	Non-album single (Frieren: Beyond Journey's End)	
2023	"Bliss"	Milet	Composition & arrangements	"Anytime Anywhere" (single)	
2025	"Paper Airplane"	Suis from Yorushika	Composition & lyrics	Non-album single (Pokémon: Dragonite and the Special Delivery)	
2025	"Sora to Yakusoku"	Mao Itō (as China Kuramoto)	Composition & arrangement	Non-album single (Gakuen Idolmaster)	
2026	"The Story of Us"	Milet	Arrangements	Non-album single (Frieren: Beyond Journey's End season 2)	
