= Kabukibu! =

Japanese light novel series & its adaptations

- Cover of the first volume of the light novel, as published by Kadokawa Shoten, featuring the main characters.

カブキブ!
- Light novel
- Written by: Yūri Eda
- Illustrated by: Ishinoya
- Published by: Kadokawa Shoten
- Imprint: Kadokawa Bunko
- Original run: August 24, 2013 – November 25, 2017
- Volumes: 7
- Manga
- Written by: Yūri Eda
- Illustrated by: Chizu Kamikō
- Published by: Kadokawa
- Magazine: Young Ace
- Original run: February 3, 2017 – February 2, 2018
- Volumes: 2
- Anime television series
- Directed by: Kazuhiro Yoneda
- Written by: Yoshiko Nakamura
- Music by: Masaru Yokoyama
- Studio: Studio Deen
- Licensed by: NA: Sentai Filmworks
- Original network: TBS, CBC, MBS, BS-TBS, TBC, SBS, TBS Channel 1, RKB
- Original run: April 6, 2017 – June 22, 2017
- Episodes: 12
- icon

Kabukibu! (カブキブ!; lit. 'Kabuki Club!') is a light novel series written by Yūri Eda, with illustrations by Ishinoya. The series began on August 24, 2013, and finished with seven volumes, published by Kadokawa Shoten on November 25, 2017. The series is about Kurogo Kurusu, a boy who is obsessed with kabuki and decides to form a kabuki club at his high school. A manga adaptation by Chizu Kamiko is being serialized on Kadokawa Shoten's Young Ace since March 2017. A 12-episode anime television series adaptation by Studio Deen, (with original character designs by CLAMP) aired between April 6, 2017, and June 22, 2017.

== Plot ==
Kurogo Kurusu, a high school boy who loves the art of kabuki, so much that it is annoying. He yearns to perform kabuki for a club, but his school doesn't have one. Kurogo decides to create his own and sets out to gather members.

== Characters ==
Kurogo Kurusu (来栖黒悟)
Voiced by: Taichi Ichikawa
The main protagonist of the series, Kurusu is an upbeat high school boy with passion for kabuki. He is simple-minded and straightforward. It is unknown what happened to his parents, since he lives with his aunt Saiko, a manga artist who is often rushing to meet deadlines, leaving Kurusu to take care of himself. He's noted to be short of height and having a baby-face. However, his love for Kabuki is unparalleled. He is the president and director of the club.
Tonbo Murase (村瀬とんぼ)
Voiced by: Yūichiro Umehara
Kurusu's neighbour and best friend, who aids him in creating his kabuki club. He's good with information and can easily find potential candidates for the club or other references for whatever Kurusu needs. He's more serious than Kurusu, but fully supports him. During his early childhood he earned many awards, which in turn generated the ire and envy of his peers, causing them to bully him relentlessly until he passed out in his home from the fear. As a result he moved next to Kurusu with the two becoming close. He acts as the sound and light director of the club.
Shin Akutsu (阿久津新)
Voiced by: Ryōta Ōsaka
A descendant from a family of Kabuki performers. He's aware of kabuki and knows many of its customs but resents it for unknown reasons. He attempts instead to form a Rock Band, but he is tone-deaf and doesn't get along with his fellow members. Akutsu is noted to be fairly talented at Kabuki, however his deeply narcissistic personality along his recurrent need to be the center of attention are his major setbacks. He had his hair dyed red and blond until he cut it down, now having a much shorter brown-coloured hair. He has a complicated relationship with his family; his mother was the one who taught him Kabuki when he was younger, but lied about his father being a famous kabuki actor. Then in middle school, Shin heard the truth from his grandmother and his mother moved away to America, marrying another man. This incident is where Shin's hate for Kabuki stems from.
Jin Ebihara (蛯原仁)
Voiced by: Kengo Kawanishi
A descendant from a family of Kabuki performers. He has been practicing kabuki since he was four years old, but he still feels his performance is lacking. He greatly admires his grandfather who is a famous performer, a Living National Treasure, and aspires to be with him despite the fact his grandfather wants Jin to develop his own sense and broaden his horizons. He takes kabuki very seriously, rejecting Kurusu's proposal to join his club. He considers Kurusu's Kabuki club to be a 'joke'.
Hanamichi Niwa (丹羽花満)
Voiced by: Nobunaga Shimazaki
A tall and intimidating upperclassman from Kurusu's school. He is silent and usually covered in bruises causing many to believe he's a delinquent. He practiced dance for a long time and had a promising future but decided to quit it, in favour of more aggressive hobbies like bodybuilding and martial arts. It turns out however that Niwa is a rather effeminate individual with a liking towards feminine things (such as female dancing or even cooking), but his continuous growth and masculine traits made it exceedingly awkward to do so. Furthermore he went out with a friend he was interested on, who unfortunately had a boyfriend of her own and mostly saw Niwa as more of a female friend than a love interest, which caused him to force himself into a more masculine persona. However he's able to accept himself through Kurusu's encouragement. He is one of the performers in the club and also helps teach the other members dance.
Kaoru Asagi (浅葱芳)
Voiced by: Yuko Kaida
An upperclassman from Kurusu's school and a member of the Drama Club. Although confused by many to be male, Kaoru is in fact a girl. Her androgynous appearance and courteous behaviour make her popular amongst other girls, even those from other schools. Kurusu tries to recruit her, much to her surprise as kabuki is usually performed by men. She eventually joins the Kabuki Club, performing there and in the Drama Club.
Maruko Janome (蛇ノ目丸子)
Voiced by: Yumi Uchiyama
A student from Kurusu's school, she is Akutsu's neighbour and childhood friend. A passionate otaku, she's well renowned in the internet due to her talent in creating costumes of varying designs. She is blunt, speaks fast and is well aware of her chubby face, believing herself to be unattractive and thus "beats people" in saying it first. She's eventually recruited into the Kabuki Club as the costume designer.
Riri Miwayama (三輪山梨里)
Voiced by: Ayaka Asai
Niwa's childhood friend and current classmate. She spent a year in Canada so she was unaware of the reasons that changed Niwa's personality. She joins the Kabuki Club as a helper upon Niwa's request.
Kazuma Katsumi (数馬克己)
Voiced by: Kazutomi Yamamoto
A member of the Drama Club. He assists the Kabuki Club upon Kaoru's request. Although he likes drama, he feels increasingly frustrated by the Drama Club's president feminist's management, putting males in charge of lesser tasks. Becoming motivated by Kurusu's ideas he quits the Drama Club and becomes a full member of the Kabuki Club. He is later revealed to have a girlfriend.
Tsurani Toomi (遠見連)
Voiced by: Tomoaki Maeno
A teacher in Kurusu's school. He serves as the "advisor" of the Kabuki Club, however he knows very little about Kabuki and mostly serves to fill in a position to allow the club's existence.

== Media ==
=== Light novel ===
The novel series, published by Kadokawa Shoten, began with the first volume published on August 24, 2013, and ended with seven volumes on November 25, 2017.

=== Manga ===
The manga adaptation by Chizu Kamikō began serialization on Kadokawa Shoten's Young Ace on February 3, 2017, and its final volume on February 2, 2018.

=== Anime ===
An anime television series adaptation was announced on August 12, 2016. The anime was directed by Kazuhiro Yoneda. Studio Deen produced the animation, Yoshiko Nakamura handled series composition, Majiro adapted the original character designs by CLAMP, and Masaru Yokoyama composed the music. The anime aired from April 6, 2017, to June 22, 2017, on TBS and ran for 12 episodes. The opening theme, "Running High", is performed by Hiro Shimono. Sentai Filmworks have licensed the anime and streamed it on Amazon's Anime Strike.

No.	Title	Original release date
1	"This One from Spring..."; Transliteration: "Koitsa Haru kara..." (Japanese: こいつぁ春から...)	April 6, 2017
2	"Wisteria Grows in the Expression of my Love"; Transliteration: "Itoshi to Kaite Fuji no Hana" (Japanese: いとしと書いて藤の花)	April 13, 2017
3	"You Say You Do Not Know? Then Let Me Tell You!"; Transliteration: "Shiraza Itte Kikase Yashō" (Japanese: 知らざあいって聞かせやしよう)	April 20, 2017
4	"Stop, Stop! I'm Here to Stop You!"; Transliteration: "Matte Matte Ichiban Matte Moraō Ka" (Japanese: 待って待って一番待ってもらおうか)	April 27, 2017
5	"Hear Ye, Hear Ye!"; Transliteration: "Tozai, Tōzai!" (Japanese: とざい、東西)	May 4, 2017
6	"Now, Upon Careful Consideration..."; Transliteration: "Sore Tsura-tsura Omon mireba..." (Japanese: それつらつらおもんみれば...)	May 11, 2017
7	"Stop a Moment, Stop a Moment!"; Transliteration: "Shibaraku, Shibaraku!" (Japanese: 暫く、暫く！)	May 18, 2017
8	"The Moon is Clouded Over..."; Transliteration: "Tsuki mo oboro ni shirauo no..." (Japanese: 月も朧に白魚の......)	May 25, 2017
9	"I Jumped In to Intervene..."; Transliteration: "Mikane te naka ni tobikomu mo..." (Japanese: 見かねて中に飛び込むも......)	June 1, 2017
10	"Family is Eternal, But a Man Lives Only an Age"; Transliteration: "Ie wa matsudai jin wa issei" (Japanese: 家は末代 人は一世)	June 8, 2017
11	"These Five Thieves Lined Up Here Although"; Transliteration: "Dare shiranami no go nin ren" (Japanese: 誰白浪の五人連)	June 15, 2017
12	"It Is Absurd that I Should Have to Say My Name..."; Transliteration: "Toware te nanoru mo okogamashīga" (Japanese: 問われて名乗るもおこがましいが......)	June 22, 2017

== Reception ==
Anime News Network had four editors review the first episode of the anime: Despite seeing it as a typical high school club premise, Lynzee Loveridge was optimistic about learning the art of kabuki as the show progresses from its debut episode based on the studio producing it; Jacob Chapman said that the show's "refreshing sincerity and quirky flavor" of slice-of-life could bring in viewers intrigued by the notion of knowing more about its subject matter but may have to get through subpar animation and a lack of personality to get there; Paul Jensen was enthralled by the protagonist Kurogo's passion to learn more about kabuki performances and the shift in art style when viewing them but questioned whether the show can keep that pace with further episodes. The fourth reviewer, Rebecca Silverman, felt that the slice-of-life structure the introductory episode took could hold back the potential it has with its premise, saying that it "doesn't feel like a great representation of what the show could become, even more so than other series."
