= Made of Glass (album) =

2026 studio album by Milet

- Standard cover

Studio album by Milet
- Released: August 19, 2026
- Recorded: c. 2023–2026
- Length: 65:12
- Languages: Japanese; English
- Label: SME
- Producers: Megmetal; Yoichiro Nomura; Ryosuke "Dr. R" Sakai; Evan Call; Tomolow; Kazuma Nagasawa; Koichi Tsutaya; Yusuke Kobayashi; Milet

Milet chronology
Anytime Anywhere (2024)	Made of Glass (2026)	Milet × Toru (2026)

Singles from Made of Glass
- 1. "Anytime Anywhere" Released: September 29, 2023; 2. "Hanataba" Released: June 5, 2024; 3. "I Still" Released: February 26, 2025; 4. "The Story of Us" Released: March 4, 2026; 5. "Sunny" Released: September 2, 2026

Made of Glass is the fourth studio album by Japanese singer-songwriter Milet, released on August 19, 2026, via SME Records. Preceded by the release of four singles, Made of Glass is Milet's first album following a short hiatus.

== Background and release ==
In August 2023, Milet released her third studio album, 5am. Months after the release of 5am, she released the extended play (EP) Anytime Anywhere (2024), which included music featured on the Japanese anime series Frieren: Beyond Journey's End. Between mid-2024 and late 2025, Milet released a variety of singles, including "Hanataba", which was featured as the theme song for the Japanese dram Anti Hero.

In June 2026, Milet announced her fourth studio album, Made of Glass. A full track list was revealed in July.

Made of Glass was released on August 19, 2026. Three physical variants were released: a regular edition, limited CD and Blu-ray edition and a limited CD and DVD edition. Both limited variants include bonus live performance footage.

== Music ==
Rolling Stone Japan described the album primarily as post-rock record. In an interview with Rolling Stone Japan, Milet explained Made of Glass was a return to her "roots". "Unabara" was a previously unreleased track written by Milet that she wrote before her major label debut.

== Promotion ==
Made of Glass features various songs used in commercial tie-ups or as theme songs for television series. "Anytime Anywhere" and "The Story of Us" served as ending theme songs for Frieren while "Sunny" was used as the opening theme for the anime adaption of Though I Am an Inept Villainess. "Wings", originally released on the Anytime Anywhere EP, was used in a series of commercial tie-ups.

"Hurricane" was released prior to the release of the album as a digital promotional single. "Christmas Eve" later was released as a promotional single on the same day Made of Glass was released. "Sunny", which originally was released as a digital promotional single, was released as a physical single on September 2, 2026.

== Track listing ==
Made of Glass track listing
No.	Title	Writer(s)	Producer(s)	Length
1.	"Hurricane"	Milet	Megmetal	3:25
2.	"Golden Ember"	Milet; Megumi Wada	Megmetal	4:16
3.	"The Story of Us"	Milet; Yoichiro Nomura	Evan Call	4:27
4.	"Sunny"	Milet; Nomura	Nomura	3:35
5.	"I Still"	Milet; Tomolow	Tomolow	4:29
6.	"Wings"	Milet; Ryosuke Sakai	Sakai	3:42
7.	"Hanataba"	Milet; Koichi Tsutaya	Kazuma Nagasawa; Tsutaya	4:07
8.	"Bluer"	Milet; Wada	Megmetal	4:45
9.	"Unabara"	Milet	Nomura; Milet	3:57
10.	"Anytime Anywhere"	Milet; Daisuke Nakamura; Nomura	Call	3:51
11.	"Hanare Banare"	Milet; Tomolow	Tomolow	3:52
12.	"Happily"	Milet; Nomura	Nomura	3:52
13.	"Higher"	Milet; Sakai	Sakai	3:43
14.	"Masterpiece"	Milet	Yusuke Kobayashi	4:32
15.	"Christmas Eve"	Milet; Nomura	Nomura	4:13
16.	"Perfect Blue"	Kendall Miles		4:26
Total length:				65:12

== Charts ==
=== Weekly charts ===
Weekly chart performance for Made of Glass
Chart (2026)	Peak position
Japanese Albums (Oricon)	5
Japanese Combined Albums (Oricon)	5
Japanese Hot Albums (Billboard Japan)	8

=== Monthly charts ===
Monthly chart performance for Made of Glass
Chart (2026)	Position
Japanese Albums (Oricon)	18

== Release history ==
Release history and formats for Made of Glass
Region	Date	Format(s)	Version	Label	Ref.
Various	August 19, 2026	Digital download; streaming	Standard	SME	
Japan	August 19, 2026	CD	Standard	SME	
Japan	August 19, 2026	CD; DVD	Limited	SME	
Japan	August 19, 2026	CD; Blu-ray	Limited	SME	
