= Anytime Anywhere (song) =

2023 single by Milet

Single by Milet

from the album Made of Glass and the EP Anytime Anywhere
- Language: Japanese; English
- Released: September 29, 2023
- Length: 3:50
- Label: SME
- Songwriters: Milet; Daisuke Nakamura; Koichiro Nomura; Evan Call
- Producer: Evan Call

Milet singles chronology
"Kizuna no Kiseki" / "Koi Kogare" (2023)	"Anytime Anywhere" (2023)	"Hanataba" (2024)

Music video
- "Anytime Anywhere" on YouTube

"Anytime Anywhere" is a song recorded by Japanese singer Milet. It was released on September 29, 2023, through SME Records. Serving as the ending theme for the 2023 Japanese anime series Frieren: Beyond Journey's End, the song was written by Milet, Daisuke Nakamura, and Koichiro Nomura. Evan Call, who composed the music for the anime series, served as producer of the song. Commercially, "Anytime Anywhere" received mild success, peaking at number 55 on the Billboard Japan Hot 100.

== Background and release ==
In September 2022, an anime adaption of the manga series Frieren: Beyond Journey's End was announced. A year later, a trailer was released, featuring "Yūsha" by Yoasobi and "Anytime Anywhere" by Milet. The song was later released as a digital single on September 29, 2023, the same day the anime series premiered. On December 11, Milet announced her ninth extended play of the same name, later released on January 31, 2024.

== Music video ==
A music video for "Anytime Anywhere" premiered on Milet's YouTube channel on October 6, 2023.

== Live performances ==
Milet performed "Anytime Anywhere" during her concert tour, the 5am Tour.

== Credits and personnel ==
Credits adapted from Tidal.

- Milet – songwriter
- Daisuke Nakamura – songwriter
- Yoichiro Nomura – songwriter
- Evan Call – producer, arranger
- TomoLow - mixing engineer
- Hidekazu Sakai - mastering engineer

== Accolades ==
Awards and nominations for "Anytime Anywhere"
Ceremony	Year	Award	Result	Ref.
Anime Grand Prix	2024	Best Theme Song	9th place	
Anime Trending Awards	2025	Ending Theme Song of the Year	Nominated	
Asian Pop Music Awards	2023	Best Lyricist (Note: Milet credited as nominee.)	Nominated	
Japan Expo Awards	2024	Daruma for Best Ending	Won	

== Charts ==
=== Weekly charts ===
Weekly chart performance for "Anytime Anywhere"
Chart (2023)	Peak position
Japan Hot 100 (Billboard)	55
Japan Hot Animation (Billboard Japan)	15
Japan Digital Singles (Oricon)	9

=== Year-end charts ===
Year-end chart performance for "Anytime Anywhere"
Chart (2023)	Position
Japan Download Songs (Billboard Japan)	95

== Release history ==
Release history and formats for "Anytime Anywhere"
Region	Date	Format(s)	Label	Ref.
Various	September 29, 2023	Digital download; streaming	SME	
