= Dark Crow =

2019 single by Man with a Mission

Single by Man with a Mission

from the album Break and Cross the Walls II
- B-side: "86 Missed Calls"; "Reiwa"; "My Hero" (Slushii remix)
- Released: October 23, 2019
- Genre: J-pop
- Length: 4:38
- Label: Sony Music Records
- Composer: Kamikaze Boy
- Lyricists: Kamikaze Boy; Jean-Ken Johnny

Man with a Mission singles chronology
"Remember Me" (2019)	"Dark Crow" (2019)	"Change the World" (2020)

Music video
- "Dark Crow" on YouTube "86 Missed Calls" on YouTube

"Dark Crow" is a single by Japanese rock band Man with a Mission. It was released on October 23, 2019, from Sony Music Records.

== Overview ==
The theme was released about 4 months after the previous album "Remember Me". Its CD was released in 3 types: First Press Limited Edition, Regular Edition, and Anime Edition. Member Spear Rib is in charge of the disc jacket model for the first production limited edition and regular edition. The title song "Dark Crow" is the second opening theme of anime Vinland Saga. "Dark Crow" is meant to fit into the theme of the Viking themes.

The coupling song "86 Missed Calls feat. Patrick Stump" is the theme song for the film Three Nobunagas. The bonus DVD of the first production limited edition includes "Jan-Ken Johnny qualification road Director's cut version" and "Tokyo Tanaka's challenge to his flyboard Director's cut version". The bonus DVD of the anime edition includes the "TV Anime 'Vinland Saga' Special Movie".

== Track listing ==
All songs written by Jean-Ken Johnny and Kamikaze Boy (also composer), except where noted.

CD single
No.	Title	Lyrics	Music	Length
1.	"Dark Crow"			4:38
2.	"86 Missed Calls" (featuring Patrick Stump)	Johnny; Kamikaze Boy; Stump	Johnny; Kamikaze Boy; Stump	3:27
3.	"Reiwa" (featuring Milet)			4:46
4.	"My Hero" (Slushii remix)			3:13
Total length:				16:04

DVD
No.	Title	Length
1.	"Jean-Ken Johnny Road to Qualification Director's Cut Edition" (ジャン・ケン・ジョニー 資格への道 ディレクターズ・カット版)
2.	"Tokyo Tanaka Flyboard Challenge Director's Cut Edition" (トーキョー・タナカ フライボードに挑戦 ディレクターズ・カット版)

== Playing ==
- E.D. Vedder: Guitars, etc.
- Kosuke Oshima: Keyboards, Programming, Sound Produce (#1)
- Patrick Stump (Fall Out Boy): Guest Vocal, Sound Produce (#2)
- milet: Guest Vocal (#3)
- Masayuki Nakano (BOOM BOOM SATELLITES): Sound Produce (#3)
- Fat.Kohey (JUNIOR): Bagpipe (#1)
- MAI (THE REDEMPTION/trail): Trumpet (#3)

== Recorded album ==
Original

- "Break and Cross the Walls II" (#1) *Recorded as Break and Cross the Walls Ver.
- "Break and Cross the Walls I" (#2)

Vest

- 『MAN WITH A "B-SIDES & COVERS" MISSION』 (#3)
- "MAN WITH A "REMIX" MISSION" (#4)

== Charts ==
=== Weekly charts ===
Weekly chart performance for "Dark Crow"
Chart (2019)	Peak position
Japan Hot 100 (Billboard)	9
Japan Hot Animation (Billboard Japan)	2
Japan (Oricon)	3
Japan Combined Singles (Oricon)	3

=== Monthly charts ===
Monthly chart performance for "Dark Crow"
Chart (2019)	Position
Japan (Oricon)	15
