= Mukanjyo =

"MUKANJYO"

Single by Survive Said the Prophet
- Released: August 21, 2019
- Recorded: 2019
- Length: 3:12
- Label: Sony Music Records
- Songwriter: Survive Said the Prophet

Alternative cover
- First press limited edition cover, featuring Thorfinn

"Mukanjyo" (stylized as "MUKANJYO") is a song by Japanese rock band Survive Said the Prophet, serving as the first opening theme for the 2019 TV anime Vinland Saga. It was released on August 21, 2019, by Sony Music Records.

== Overview ==
The song is the opening theme for the 2019 TV anime series Vinland Saga as first revealed by manga author Makoto Yukimura in May 2019. Yosh from Survive Said the Prophet said he the band found the theme comfortable to play thanks to their relationship with Director Shūhei Yabuta. Survive Said the Prophet started pre-downloading and streaming distribution of the title song to be released on August 21. At the same time, the music video of "Mukanjyo" was also released on their YouTube channel. The music video expresses the theme of the song, "revenge." The first press limited edition includes a DVD of non-credited version of the anime's opening theme.

Also announced guest acts for the "Made in Asia Tour". Waterweed in Takamatsu on the first day, Lynch. It will be a two-band live with 10 groups such as Newspeak that turned around. The official second advance of the tour ticket started from 18:00 on August 2. Both normal and limited versions of the CD appeared in the Oricon charts upon their release taking 45th place. The theme was re-released in 2023.

== Reception ==
Anime News Network listed the song as one of the best themes from Summer 2019 especially due to its music video; It explores the early life of Thorfinn involves his desire to seek adventures around the world, but he becomes corrupted when Askeladd's forces kill his father, Thors. The young Thorfinn becomes corrupted with rage, relinquishing his humanity to become a warrior, something the first opening theme of the anime series highlights in the final parts from video where Thorfinn stares at the sky angered. At the 4th Crunchyroll Anime Awards in 2020, "Mukanjyo" was nominated for Best Opening Sequence. IGN regarded it as one of the best musical pieces in the first season due to the large amount of instruments employed.

== Track listing ==
All tracks are written by Survive Said the Prophet.

Mukanjyo standard edition
| No. | Title | Length |
|---|---|---|
| 1. | "Mukanjyo" (TV anime Vinland Saga opening theme) | 3:12 |
| 2. | "Right and left" (Spaces[s] Tour 2018–2019 Final / live ver.) | 3:29 |
| 3. | "Mukanjyo" (instrumental) | 3:06 |
| Total length: | | 9:47 |

Mukanjyo first press limited edition – disc 2
| No. | Title | Length |
|---|---|---|
| 1. | "TV anime Vinland Saga non-credit opening movie" | 1:48 |
| Total length: | | 11:35 |
