= Drown / You & I =

EP by Milet
- Released: November 4, 2019
- Genre: J-pop
- Label: SME

Milet chronology
Us (2019)	Drown / You & I (2019)	Prover / Tell me (2020)

"Drown / You & I is Japanese singer Milet's fourth EP. It was released in November 4, 2019, by SME Records. (Note: Videos can be watched here: https://www.youtube.com/watch?v=ce_9Ze-gf2o and https://www.youtube.com/watch?v=d1KwEOSAkh4)

== Overview ==
"Drown" is the second ending theme for the NHK General anime Vinland Saga. A song written for Vinland Saga. "Drown", which has an alternative sound. "I wrote this song with swirling pain, hope, strength, and love. Step by step, I sang with my emotions to the beat that made me step strongly on the earth' commented. Music video Filmed in the Alabama Hills, California, USA, this spectacular work tells the story of Milet's encounter with a wolf and his journey through the great outdoors.

"You & I" is a tie-up song for the "Flare Fragrance & Sports" CM. "You & I" is a song with a light electro sound that follows the flow of Us. ``Kiss and play with two people. It's not a song with a very high key, and it's a song with a slightly lower center of gravity, but I wanted to create a rhythm that would make you want to start running without being too heavy. ' commented. The music video features colorful costumes. It consists of a fantastic world sung by Milet in the air and a side story depicting the anxiety and frustration of a pair of men and women.

The first press limited edition comes with a DVD containing music videos for 3rd EP "us" and Fire Arrow. In addition, the limited edition is an SP package and comes with a DVD containing the non-credit ending theme of Vinland Saga.

== Contents ==
CD
No.	Title	Lyrics	Music	Length
1.	"Drown"	Ryosuke "Dr.R" Sakai, Milet	milet, Ryosuke "Dr.R" Sakai	3:33
2.	"You & I"	milet	Yoichiro Nomura, TomoLow, Milet	3:50
3.	"Fine Line"	Ryosuke "Dr.R" Sakai, Milet	Ryosuke "Dr.R" Sakai, Milet	3:21
4.	"Imaginary Love"	milet, Ryosuke "Dr.R" Sakai, Taisuke Nakamura	milet, Ryosuke "Dr.R" Sakai, Taisuke Nakamura	3:51
Total length:				TBD

DVD (first press limited edition only)
No.	Title	Length
1.	"us" (MUSIC VIDEO)
2.	"Fire Arrows" (MUSIC VIDEO)

DVD (limited edition only)
No.	Title	Length
1.	"Vinland Saga" (Non-credit ending theme)

== Video ==
Chart reference:*Weekly 3rd (Digital, Oricon)
