= Milet (singer) =

Japanese singer-songwriter

Milet ミレイ
- Born: November 24, 1998 (age 27); Tokyo, Japan
- Origin: Japan
- Genres: J-pop; indie pop
- Occupations: Singer; songwriter; actress
- Instrument: Vocals
- Years active: 2018–present
- Label: SME Records
- Website: milet.jp

Milet (ミレイ, Mirei) is a Japanese singer, songwriter, and actress. She made her major debut in 2019 with Inside You EP. The EP peaked at number 16 on the Oricon Albums Chart. After releasing five EPs, she released first studio album Eyes in 2020. The album hit number one on both Oricon and Japan's Billboard chart, certified gold by the Recording Industry Association of Japan for sales of 100,000.

== Career ==
Milet is a Tokyo-based Japanese singer-songwriter. She started her career in 2018.

On March 6, 2019, her first live show, Milet Special Show Case @Billboard-Live Tokyo, was held at Billboard Live Tokyo. In that same year, several of her songs were featured in various media. Her songs "Us" and "Again and Again" were used as the openings for Japanese TV dramas Gisou Furin and Joker x Face respectively, while her songs "Drown", and "Prover"/"Tell me" were used as the second ending theme for the anime series adaptation of Vinland Saga and Fate/Grand Order – Absolute Demonic Front: Babylonia, respectively.

On June 3, 2020, Milet released her debut album Eyes, which hit number one on Oricon Albums Chart. She collaborated on the album with guitarist Toru of One OK Rock and Man with a Mission member Kamikaze Boy.

Starting from October 4, 2020, Milet became a DJ host for the radio series Music Freaks, streaming every Sunday from 22:00 to 24:00 (JST) on the Osaka radio station FM802 from a studio in Minami-morimachi. The radio broadcasts are stated to last one year.

Her single "Ordinary Days" was used as the ending theme for the live-action drama adaptation of Police in a Pod, which aired from July 7 to September 15, 2021.

On November 12, 2020, the song "Who I Am" premiered on YouTube and was subsequently featured as the title track of her sixth mini-album, which released on December 2, 2020. "Who I Am" and the song "The Hardest" were both respectively used as the opening and ending themes of the Japanese television drama Shichinin no Hisho.

Milet debut in the popular annual TV music show, 71st NHK Kōhaku Uta Gassen, on 31 December 2020 with the song "Inside You".

On August 8, 2021, she performed at the closing ceremony of the 2020 Tokyo Olympics. She covered the song "Hymne à l'amour", originally sung by Edith Piaf. On November 18, 2021, she represented Japan in the 10th Asia-Pacific Broadcasting Union (ABU) TV Song Festival, performing her first big hit "Inside You" remotely. On December 31, 2021, she participated in the "NHK Kōhaku Uta Gassen" for the second consecutive year, performing "Fly High."

On April 22, 2022, Milet released a teaser lyric video for a new single entitled "Walkin' in My Lane", which serves as the theme song to the live-action drama adaptation of the manga Yangotonaki Ichizoku. It was pre-released on streaming services on April 29, and was fully released on May 25, 2022, along with "Love When I Cry" and "My Dreams Are Made of Hell."

On September 29, 2023, Milet released her single "Anytime Anywhere", which was used as the ending theme for season one of the anime adaptation of Frieren: Beyond Journey's End. Her song "Bliss," from the same EP, was used as the special ending theme for the two hour special premieres of the two cours of the anime.

In 2025, she made her film debut in the remake of the French-Belgian film Love at Second Sight, titled My Beloved Stranger.

== Discography ==
=== Studio albums ===
List of studio albums, with selected details, chart positions, sales and certifications
Title	Details	Peak chart positions		Sales	Certifications
Title	Details	JPN	JPN Hot	Sales	Certifications
Eyes	Released: June 3, 2020; Label: SME; Formats: CD, CD+DVD, digital download, streaming	1	1	JPN: 82,392 (Phy.); JPN: 16,641 (Dig.)	RIAJ: Gold
Visions	Released: February 2, 2022; Label: SME; Formats: CD, digital download, streaming	5	4	JPN: 26,437 (Phy.)	
5am	Released: August 30, 2023; Label: SME; Formats: CD, digital download, streaming	4	4	JPN: 17,620 (Phy.)	
Made of Glass	Released: August 19, 2026; Label: SME; Formats: CD, digital download, streaming	5	8	JPN: 12,960 (Phy.)	

=== Extended plays ===
List of extended plays, with selected details and chart positions
Title	Details	Peak chart positions	
Title	Details	JPN	JPN Hot
Inside You EP	Released: March 6, 2019; Label: SME; Formats: CD, digital download, streaming	16	—
Wonderland EP	Released: May 15, 2019; Label: SME; Formats: CD, digital download, streaming	18	9
Us	Released: August 21, 2019; Label: SME; Formats: CD, digital download, streaming	11	8
Drown / You & I	Released: November 6, 2019; Label: SME; Formats: CD, digital download, streaming	25	10
Prover / Tell Me	Released: February 19, 2020; Label: SME; Formats: CD, digital download, streaming	11	7
Who I Am	Released: December 2, 2020; Label: SME; Formats: CD, digital download, streaming	10	7
Ordinary Days	Released: August 4, 2021; Label: SME; Formats: CD, digital download, streaming	8	5
Flare	Released: March 9, 2022; Label: SME; Formats: CD, digital download, streaming	6	7
Anytime Anywhere	Released: January 31, 2024; Label: SME; Formats: CD, digital download	7	5
"—" denotes items which did not chart.

==== Compilation extended plays ====
List of compilation extended plays, with selected details and chart positions
Title	Details
Milet × Toru	Released: November 5, 2026; Label: SME; Formats: Digital download, streaming

=== Live albums ===
List of live albums
Title	Details
Milet Live at Nippon Budokan	Released: July 29, 2024; Label: SME; Formats: CD, digital download, streaming
Milet 5th Anniversary Live "Green Lights"	Released: July 23, 2025; Label: SME; Formats: CD, digital download, streaming

=== Singles ===
==== As lead artist ====
List of singles, with selected chart positions
Title	Year	Peak chart positions			Certification	Album
Title	Year	JPN	JPN Hot	WW	Certification	Album
"Inside You"	2019	—	11	—	RIAJ: Gold (download); RIAJ: Gold (streaming)	Inside You EP & Eyes
"Us"	2019	—	14	—	RIAJ: Gold (download); RIAJ: Platinum (streaming)	Inside You EP & Eyes
"Checkmate"	2021	—	100	—		Visions
"Omokage" (with Aimer and Lilas Ikuta)	2021	—	11	—	RIAJ: Platinum (st.)	Non-album single
"Walkin' in My Lane"	2022	10	25	—		5am
"Always You"	2022	9	54	—		5am
"Final Call"	2022	—	64	—		5am
"Kizuna no Kiseki" (with Man with a Mission)	2023	4	2	140	RIAJ: Platinum (dig.); 2× Platinum (st.)	The Circus
"Koi Kogare" (with Man with a Mission)	2023	4	25	—	RIAJ: Gold (dig.)	5am
"Anytime Anywhere"	2023	—	55	—		Anytime Anywhere & Made of Glass
"Hanataba"	2024	8	19	—	RIAJ: Gold (st.)	Made of Glass
"Out of the Loop" (with Jason Chan)	2024	—	—	—		Non-album single
"I Still"	2025	15	35	—		Made of Glass
"Nobody Knows"	2025	15	— (Note: "Nobody Knows" did not enter the Billboard Japan Hot 100 chart, but peaked at number 68 on the Billboard Japan Download Songs chart.)	—		Non-album singles
"Goddess"	2025	—	— (Note: "Goddess" did not enter the Billboard Japan Hot 100 chart, but peaked at number 36 on the Billboard Japan Download Songs chart.)	—		Non-album singles
"Waterproof"	2025	—	— (Note: "Waterproof" did not enter the Billboard Japan Hot 100 chart, but peaked at number 33 on the Billboard Japan Download Songs chart.)	—		Non-album singles
"Swamp"	2025	—	— (Note: "Swamp" did not enter the Billboard Japan Hot 100 chart, but peaked at number 31 on the Billboard Japan Download Songs chart.)	—		Non-album singles
"The Story of Us"	2026	6	50	—		Made of Glass
"Sunny"	2026	31	— (Note: "Sunny" did not enter the Billboard Japan Hot 100 chart, but peaked at number 23 on the Billboard Japan Download Songs chart.)	—		Made of Glass
"My Voice, My Life"	2026	—	—	—		Non-album single
"—" denotes items that did not chart or items that were ineligible to chart because no physical edition was released.

==== As featured artist ====
List of singles, with selected chart positions
Title	Year	Peak chart positions	Album
Title	Year	JPN	Album
"Reiwa" (Man with a Mission featuring Milet)	2019	3	Dark Crow
"Future Tone Bender" (TK from Ling Tosite Sigure featuring Milet)	2021	—	Egomaniac Feedback
"Cheat Day" (Jason Chan featuring Milet)	2024	—	Non-album singles
"Flame" (Plave featuring Milet)	2026	—	Non-album singles
"—" denotes items which did not chart.

==== Promotional singles ====
List of promotional singles, with selected chart positions and certifications
Title	Year	Peak chart positions	Certification	Album
Title	Year	JPN Hot	Certification	Album
"You & I"	2019	— (Note: "You & I" did not enter the Billboard Japan Hot 100 chart, but peaked at number 65 on the Billboard Japan Download Songs chart.)		Drown / You & I and Eyes
"Prover"	2020	— (Note: "Prover" did not enter the Billboard Japan Hot 100 chart, but peaked at number 65 on the Billboard Japan Download Songs chart.)		Prover / Tell Me & Eyes
"Tell Me"	2020	86		Prover / Tell Me & Eyes
"Who I Am"	2020	65		Who I Am & Visions
"The Hardest"	2020	—		Who I Am & Visions
"Ordinary Days"	2021	—	RIAJ: Gold (st.)	Ordinary Days & Visions
"Fly High"	2022	71		Visions
"Flare"	2022	34		Flare
"Wake Me Up"	2022	— (Note: "Wake Me Up" did not enter the Billboard Japan Hot 100 chart, but peaked at number 48 on the Billboard Japan Download Songs chart.)		Visions
"Living My Life"	2023	— (Note: "Living My Life" did not enter the Billboard Japan Hot 100 chart, but peaked at number 26 on the Billboard Japan Download Songs chart.)		5am
"Hey Song"	2023	—		5am
"The Roar of Victory" (with Man with a Mission and Go Shiina)	2024	—		Non-album single
"Hurricane"	2026	— (Note: "Hurricane" did not enter the Billboard Japan Hot 100 chart, but peaked at number 64 on the Billboard Japan Download Songs chart.)		Made of Glass
"Christmas Eve"	2026	—		Made of Glass
"Hanare Banare"	2026	—		Made of Glass
"—" denotes items that did not chart.

== Filmography ==
=== Film ===
Year	Title	Role	Notes	Ref.
2025	My Beloved Stranger	Minami Maezono		

== Awards ==
Name of the award ceremony, year presented, nominee(s) of the award, award category, and the result of the nomination
Year	Award ceremony	Category	Nominee/work	Result	Ref.
2019	International Drama Festival in Tokyo	Theme Song Awards	"Inside You"	Won	
2019	Recochoku Annual Ranking	New Artist Ranking	Herself	Won	
2021	Space Shower Music Awards	Best Breakthrough Artist	Herself	Nominated	
2021	CD Shop Awards	Finalist Award	Eyes	Won	
