= Second Person (album) =

2026 studio album by Yorushika

Studio album by Yorushika
- Released: March 4, 2026
- Genres: Swing; bossa nova
- Length: 81:33
- Language: Japanese
- Label: Polydor
- Producer: N-buna

Yorushika chronology
Magic Lantern (2023)	Second Person (2026)

Singles from Second Person
- 1. "Moonbath" Released: October 13, 2023; 2. "Sunny" Released: January 5, 2024; 3. "Rubato" Released: May 29, 2024; 4. "Forget It" Released: July 13, 2024; 5. "Aporia" Released: October 7, 2024; 6. "Sun" Released: November 22, 2024; 7. "Snake" Released: January 17, 2025; 8. "Martian" Released: May 9, 2025; 9. "Shura" Released: August 8, 2025; 10. "Play Sick" Released: December 22, 2025

Second Person (Japanese: 二人称, Hepburn: Nininshō; stylized in all lowercase) is the fifth studio album by Japanese rock duo Yorushika, released on March 4, 2026, via Polydor Records. The album accompanies the epistolary novel of the same name, written by producer N-buna.

A swing music album with elements of bossa nova, Second Person is a concept album depicting a story of a young boy writing poetry on a set of letters while receiving guided feedback from his teacher. The album also contains a re-recording of "Hitchcock" from the duo's extended play A Loser Doesn't Need an Encore (2018).

== Background and release ==
Yorushika released their fourth studio album, Magic Lantern (2023), as an art book. While the art book contained 25 tracks, the digital release of the album initially included 10 tracks. From late 2023 to late 2025, the duo released a series of singles, including "Sunny", which served as the second opening theme song for the Japanese anime series Frieren: Beyond Journey's End. The fourth single, "Forget It" served as the theme song of the Japanese drama series Going Home: Cops for the Lost. The eighth single, "Martian" served as the second opening theme song for the Japanese anime series Shoshimin: How to Become Ordinary.

On December 22, 2025, Yorushika announced their fifth studio album, Second Person. The duo additionally announced the epistolary novel of the same name, which was later released on February 26, 2026, under the publishing company Kodansha. On February 18, 2026, Yorushika released a teaser video of Second Person.

Second Person was released on March 4, 2026, by Polydor Records. Similar to Magic Lantern, Second Person was released as a digital album.

== Promotion ==
On January 13, 2026, Yorushika announced the First Person Tour, which began on March 21, 2026. The tour concluded on September 16, 2026.

== Track listing ==
All tracks are written by and produced by N-buna.

No.	Title	Length
1.	"Early Morning, Mailbox" (早朝、郵便受け)	1:05
2.	"Become a Cloud" (雲になる)	4:07
3.	"The Flowers Are Also Noisy" (花も騒めく)	3:41
4.	"Devilishness" (魔性)	4:40
5.	"Play Sick" (プレイシック)	3:54
6.	"Post Spring" (ポスト春)	3:19
7.	"Sun" (太陽)	4:26
8.	"Sunny" (晴る)	4:33
9.	"Forget It" (忘れてください)	3:38
10.	"Shura" (修羅)	3:53
11.	"Martian" (火星人)	3:53
12.	"Rubato" (ルバート)	3:50
13.	"Cremation" (火葬)	3:03
14.	"Aporia" (アポリア)	3:49
15.	"Snake" (へび)	4:20
16.	"Groan" (うめき)	3:18
17.	"Woodpecker" (啄木鳥)	3:36
18.	"Hitchcock" (ヒッチコック) (re-recording)	3:45
19.	"Moonbath" (月光浴)	4:11
20.	"Plover" (千鳥)	4:12
21.	"Paddle" (櫂)	3:58
22.	"To the Sea" (海へ)	2:09
Total length:		81:33

Notes

- Tracks 1–3, 6, 9, and 22 are stylized in sentence case when presented in English.

== Personnel ==
- Suis – vocals
- N-buna – production, instruments
- Mitsuyasu Shimozuru – guitar
- Tatsuya Kitani – bass
- Masack – drums
- Tetsuya Hirahata – keyboards
- Hideyuki Matsuhashi – mixing

== Charts ==
=== Weekly charts ===
Weekly chart performance for Second Person
Chart (2026)	Peak position
Japanese Combined Albums (Oricon)	7
Japanese Hot Albums (Billboard Japan)	2

== Release history ==
Release history and formats for Second Person
Region	Date	Format	Label	Ref.
Various	March 4, 2026	Digital download; streaming	Polydor	
