= Creation (Yorushika EP) =

EP by Yorushika
- Released: January 27, 2021
- Studios: Matsusuta (Tokyo); Aobadai (Tokyo); Greenbird (Tokyo); aLIVE Recording (Tokyo)
- Genres: J-pop; rock
- Length: 18:50
- Language: Japanese
- Label: Universal J
- Producer: n-buna

Yorushika chronology
Plagiarism (2020)	Creation (2021)	Magic Lantern (2023)

Singles from Creation
- 1. "Eat the Wind" Released: October 7, 2020; 2. "Spring Thief" Released: January 9, 2021

Creation (創作, Sōsaku) is the first EP by Japanese rock duo Yorushika. It was released on January 27, 2021, by Universal J.

== Track listing ==
All tracks are written by N-buna.

Creation track listing
No.	Title	Length
1.	"Robbery and Bouquet (強盗と花束, Gōtō to Hanataba)"	3:10
2.	"Spring Thief (春泥棒, Haru Dorobō)"	4:50
3.	"Creation (創作, Sōsaku) (Note: track 3 is instrumental)"	1:33
4.	"Eat the Wind (風を食む, Kaze o Hamu)"	4:25
5.	"Liar (嘘月, Uso Tsuki; lit. 'Lying Moon')" (anime film A Whisker Away ending theme)	4:50
Total length:		18:50

== Personnel ==
Main

- n-buna – lyrics, music, arrangement, guitar, chorus, piano, other instruments, and producer
- suis – vocals

Supporting

- Mitsuyasu Shimozuru (下鶴 光康, Shimozuru Mitsuyasu) – guitar
- Tatsuya Kitani (キタニ タツヤ, Kitani Tatsuya) – bass
- Masack – drums
- Tetsuya Hirahata (平畑 徹也, Hirahata Tetsuya) – piano, keyboards
- Hayato Watanabe (渡邊 勇人, Watanabe Hayato) – flute

Engineers／Directors／Producers

- Hideyuki Matsuhashi (松橋 秀幸, Matsuhashi Hideyuki) – recording engineer, mixing engineer
- Yūji Chinone (茅根 裕司, Chinone Yūji) – mastering engineer
- Yasuyuki Kondō (近藤 康行, Kondō Yasuyuki) – recording director
- Miyuki Nakamura (中村 美幸, Nakamura Miyuki), Yōsuke Maeda (前田 洋佑, Maeda Yōsuke), Akihiro Furuichi (古市 暁大, Furuichi Akihiro) – assistant engineers
- Taku Nakamura (中村 卓, Nakamura Taku), Shoki Abe (阿部 祥紀, Abe Shoki), Hideichi Kurita (栗田 秀一, Kurita Hideichi) – executive producers
- Shinichi Kubota (久保田 信一, Kubota Shinichi) – studio coordinator for Spring Thief (春泥棒, Haru Dorobō)

Coordinators

- Takehide Ishiyama (石山 武秀, Ishiyama Takehide) – chief manager
- Hirohito Ametani (飴谷 嘉人, Ametani Hirohito) – manager
- Anju Ikeda (池田 安寿, Ikeda Anju) – A&R
- Daigo Aonuma (青沼 大悟, Aonuma Daigo) – marketing planner
- Naoko Iwasaki (岩崎 直子, Iwasaki Naoko) – sales promotion
- Midori Shimizu (清水 美登里, Shimizu Midori) – artwork coordinator

Art

- DMYM/No.734 – art director, design
- Iori Majima (真島 伊織, Majima Iori) – design management
- Tetsuya Nagato (永戸 鉄也, Nagato Tetsuya) – artwork

Studios

- Recording studios – Matsusuta. (マツスタ.) Studio (Tokyo, Japan), Aobadai Studio (Meguro, Tokyo, Japan), Studio Greenbird (Shinjuku, Tokyo, Japan), aLIVE Recording Studio (Setagaya, Tokyo, Japan)
- Mixing studio – Matsusuta. (マツスタ.) Studio (Tokyo, Japan)
- Mastered by Yūji Chinone (茅根 裕司, Chinone Yūji) at Sony Music Studios (Tokyo, Japan)

== Charts ==
=== Weekly charts ===
Weekly chart performance for Creation
Chart (2021)	Peak position
Japanese Hot Albums (Billboard Japan)	2
Japanese Albums (Oricon)	4

=== Year-end charts ===
Year-end chart performance for Creation
Chart (2021)	Position
Japanese Hot Albums (Billboard Japan)	62
