= Spring Thief =

Single by Yorushika

from the EP Creation
- Language: Japanese
- Released: January 9, 2021
- Genre: J-pop
- Length: 4:50
- Label: Universal J
- Songwriter: N-buna
- Producer: N-buna

Yorushika singles chronology
"Eat the Wind" (2020)	"Spring Thief" (2021)	"Matasaburō" (2021)

Music video
- "Spring Thief" on YouTube

"Spring Thief" (Japanese: 春泥棒, Hepburn: Haru Dorobō) is song by Japanese duo Yorushika from their third extended play Creation (2021). It was released as a single through Universal J on January 9, 2021. Commercially, the song peaked at number 27 on the Oricon Combined Singles Chart and number 23 on the Billboard Japan Hot 100, and received platinum certification for streaming by the Recording Industry Association of Japan (RIAJ).

== Background and release ==
On March 20, 2020, Yorushika's "Spring Thief" first appeared as a jingle for Taisei Corporation commercial "Myanmar". Eight months later, on November 26, Yorushika announced the EP Creation, to be released on January 27 the next year, which was included "Spring Thief". The song was available digitally ahead of the EP on January 9, 2021.

== Lyrics and composition ==
According to N-buna, a lone zelkova tree in Showa Memorial Park that he want it to be cherry blossoms inspired him to write the song by comparing the spring wind that scatters the cherry blossoms as "spring thief". Lyrically, "Spring Thief" depicts life's transience, unlike songs related to spring in general. Writing for Billboard Japan, Mao Komachi speculated that the song has a nuance of stealing a life.

== Music video ==
Kohta Morie directed an accompanying animated music video for "Spring Thief", premiered on the same day as the single. A sequel to "Plagiarism" music video, the story follows wife's perspective of a male protagonist. It shows a dog, who had been interested in the wife, gradually becoming less responsive to her, and she running to the husband on the train, but unable to catch up with him.

== Charts ==
=== Weekly charts ===
Weekly chart performance for "Spring Thief"
Chart (2021)	Peak position
Japan (Japan Hot 100)	23
Japan Combined Singles (Oricon)	27

=== Year-end charts ===
Year-end chart performance for "Spring Thief"
Chart (2021)	Position
Japan (Japan Hot 100)	72

== Certifications ==
Certifications for "Spring Thief"
Region	Certification	Certified units/sales
Japan (RIAJ)	Gold	100,000^{*}
Streaming
Japan (RIAJ)	2× Platinum	200,000,000^{†}
^{*} Sales figures based on certification alone.^{†} Streaming-only figures based on certification alone.
