= Say It (Yorushika song) =

Song by Yorushika
- Language: Japanese
- Released: June 28, 2017
- Genre: J-pop; rock
- Length: 4:03
- Label: U&R
- Songwriter: N-buna
- Producer: N-buna

Music video
- "Say It" on YouTube

"Say It" (言って。, Itte.) is a song by the Japanese rock band Yorushika. The song is included in their first mini-album, The Summer Grass Is Getting in My Way, released by U&R Records on June 28, 2017. As of December 24, 2024, the song has been listened to over 173 million times.

== Composition ==
"Say It" is described as having an "upbeat and somewhat catchy tone that disguises and contrasts with the lyrics and themes it’s trying to say." "Say It" is written in the A Minor key.

== Credits ==
Sources

- Suis - vocals
- N-buna - guitar, lyrics, composition, arrangement
- Mitsuyasu Shimotsuru - guitar
- Tatsuya Kitani - bass
- Masack - drums

== Certifications ==
Certifications for "Say it"
Region	Certification	Certified units/sales
Japan (RIAJ)	Platinum	100,000,000^{†}
^{†} Streaming-only figures based on certification alone.
