= Magic Lantern (album) =

Studio album by Yorushika
- Released: April 5, 2023
- Studios: Matsusuta (Tokyo, Japan); Aobadai Studio (Meguro, Tokyo, Japan); Sounduno (Minato, Tokyo, Japan); ABS Recording (Shibuya, Tokyo, Japan)
- Genres: J-pop; rock
- Length: 96:43
- Language: Japanese
- Label: Polydor
- Producer: N-buna

Yorushika chronology
Creation (2021)	Magic Lantern (2023)	Second Person (2026)

Singles from Magic Lantern
- 1. "Matasaburō" Released: June 7, 2021; 2. "The Old Man and the Sea" Released: August 18, 2021; 3. "Howl at the Moon" Released: October 6, 2021; 4. "Bremen" Released: July 4, 2022; 5. "Left-Right Confusion" Released: July 25, 2022; 6. "Chinokate" Released: August 29, 2022; 7. "Algernon" Released: February 6, 2023; 8. "451" Released: March 8, 2023

Magic Lantern (幻燈, Gentō) is the first art book and fourth studio album by Japanese rock duo Yorushika. It was released on April 5, 2023, by Polydor Records.

The art book contains two chapters titled "Portrait of Summer" (夏の肖像, Natsu no Shōzō) and "Dancing Animals" (踊る動物, Odoru Dōbutsu), and consists of illustrations by Ryū Katō containing a scannable QR code that redirects to a dedicated website for music playback.

Most of the songs are not available in the digital edition and are only accessible through the art book. The duo has also stated that the art book or album will not be released on a CD.

== Release ==
The art book and digital edition of the album were both released on April 5, 2023, by Polydor Records. The art book contains 25 songs in total, including the previously released singles "Matasaburō", "The Old Man and the Sea", "Howl at the Moon", "Bremen", "Left-Right Confusion", "Chinokate", and "451".

The art book contains all 25 songs, but the digital edition only includes 10 songs, 8 of them being previously released singles, and the two new ones being "Miyakōchi" from the first chapter "Portrait of Summer" and "The First Night" from the second chapter "Dancing Animals".

The remaining 15 songs were released digitally on streaming services on July 1, 2026.

== Track listing ==
All lyrics, music, and arrangement by N-buna.

Chapter 1: Portrait of Summer (夏の肖像, Natsu no Shōzō)
No.	Title	Length
1.	"Portrait of Summer (夏の肖像, Natsu no Shōzō)"	5:25
2.	"Miyakōchi (都落ち)"	4:10
3.	"Bremen (ブレーメン, Buremen)"	4:32
4.	"Chinokate (チノカテ)"	4:07
5.	"Yukiguni (雪国, Snow Country)"	4:47
6.	"Howl at the Moon (月に吠える, Tsuki ni Hoeru)"	4:26
7.	"451"	3:29
8.	"Pas de deux (パドドゥ, Padodu)"	4:22
9.	"Matasaburō 又三郎 (Note: d-anime Store commercial song)"	3:59
10.	"Fireworks Beneath My Shoes (靴の花火, Kutsu no Hanabi)"	5:05
11.	"The Old Man and the Sea (老人と海, Rōjin to Umi)"	4:15
12.	"Sayonara Moruten (さよならモルテン, Goodbye Moruten)"	4:55
13.	"Isana (いさな, Whale)"	4:24
14.	"Left-Right Confusion (左右盲, Sayūmō)"	4:27
15.	"Algernon (アルジャーノン, Arujanon) (Note: 2021 drama Holding Hands at Dusk (夕暮れに、手をつなぐ, Yūgure ni, Te wo Tsunagu) theme song)"	4:13
Total length:		66:26

Chapter 2: Dancing Animals (踊る動物, Odoru Dōbutsu)
No.	Title	Length
1.	"The First Night (第一夜)"	4:20
2.	"The Second Night (第二夜)"	4:13
3.	"The Third Night (第三夜)"	3:51
4.	"The Fourth Night (第四夜)"	3:22
5.	"The Fifth Night (第五夜)"	3:40
6.	"The Sixth Night (第六夜)"	2:26
7.	"The Seventh Night (第七夜)"	3:13
8.	"The Eighth Night (第八夜)"	3:01
9.	"The Ninth Night (第九夜)"	2:23
10.	"The Tenth Night (第十夜)"	3:48
Total length:		96:43

Digital edition
No.	Title	Length
1.	"Miyakōchi (都落ち)"	4:10
2.	"Bremen (ブレーメン, Buremen)"	4:32
3.	"Chinokate (チノカテ)"	4:07
4.	"Howl at the Moon (月に吠える, Tsuki ni Hoeru)"	4:26
5.	"451"	3:29
6.	"Matasaburō 又三郎"	3:59
7.	"The Old Man and the Sea (老人と海, Rōjin to Umi)"	4:15
8.	"Left-Right Confusion (左右盲, Sayūmō)"	4:27
9.	"Algernon (アルジャーノン, Arujanon)"	4:13
10.	"The First Night (第一夜)"	4:20
Total length:		41:53

== Personnel ==
Main

- N-buna – lyrics, music, vocals, chorus, arrangement, guitar, piano, other instruments, and producer
- Suis – vocals

Supporting

- Mitsuyasu Shimozuru (下鶴 光康, Shimozuru Mitsuyasu) – guitar
- Tatsuya Kitani (キタニ タツヤ, Kitani Tatsuya) – bass
- Masack – drums
- Tetsuya Hirahata (平畑 徹也, Hirahata Tetsuya) – piano, keyboards
- Yūjin Komatsu (小松悠人, Komatsu Yūjin) – trumpet

Illustrations

- Ryū Katō – art book illustrations

Studios

- Recording studios – Matsusuta. (マツスタ.) (Tokyo, Japan), Aobadai Studio (Meguro, Tokyo, Japan), Sounduno Studio (Minato, Tokyo, Japan), ABS Recording Studio (Shibuya, Tokyo, Japan)

== Charts ==
=== Weekly charts ===
Weekly chart performance for Magic Lantern digital edition
Chart (2023)	Peak position
Japanese Combined Albums (Oricon)	16
Japanese Hot Albums (Billboard Japan)	5

=== Year-end charts ===
Year-end chart performance for Magic Lantern digital edition
Chart (2023)	Position
Japanese Download Albums (Billboard Japan)	29
