= Ghost in a Flower =

Single by Yorushika

from the album Plagiarism
- Language: Japanese
- Released: April 22, 2020
- Genre: J-pop; rock
- Length: 4:00
- Label: Universal J
- Songwriter: N-buna
- Producer: N-buna

Yorushika singles chronology
"Night Journey" (2020)	"Ghost in a Flower" (2020)	"Eat The Wind" (2020)

Music video
- "Ghost in a Flower" on YouTube

"Ghost in a Flower" (花に亡霊, Hana ni Bōrei) is a song by Japanese rock duo Yorushika from their third studio album Plagiarism. It was released on April 22, 2020, through Universal J. The song was used as the theme for the 2020 Japanese animated film A Whisker Away. An accompanying music video for the song premiered on the same day. Directed by Popurika, it featured footage from A Whisker Away.

== Charts ==
=== Weekly charts ===
Chart performance for "Ghost in a Flower"
Chart (2020)	Peak position
Japan (Japan Hot 100)	6
Japan Combined Singles (Oricon)	10

=== Year-end charts ===
Year-end chart performance for "Ghost in a Flower"
Chart (2020)	Position
Japan (Japan Hot 100)	42

== Certifications ==
Certifications for "Ghost in a Flower"
Region	Certification	Certified units/sales
Japan (RIAJ)	Gold	100,000^{*}
Streaming
Japan (RIAJ)	2× Platinum	200,000,000^{†}
^{*} Sales figures based on certification alone.^{†} Streaming-only figures based on certification alone.
