= Elma (album) =

Studio album by Yorushika
- Released: August 28, 2019
- Studio: Matsusuta. (Tokyo, Japan); Volta (Tokyo, Japan); Universal Music Japan (Tokyo, Japan)
- Genre: J-pop; rock
- Length: 48:12
- Language: Japanese
- Label: Universal J
- Producer: n-buna

Yorushika chronology
That's Why I Gave Up on Music (2019)	Elma (2019)	Plagiarism (2020)

Singles from Elma
- 1. "A Hole Opened Up in My Heart" Released: June 4, 2019

Elma (エルマ, Eruma) is the second studio album by Japanese rock duo Yorushika. It was released on August 28, 2019, by Universal J. This was their first album to be released by a major music label.

== Overview ==
Elma serves as a sequel to the story of the previous studio album titled, That's Why I Gave Up on Music, a concept album based on the story of "Elma and Amy". The story now follows Elma's perspective as she receives the letters and lyrics written by Amy and travels the same path in Sweden as he once did.

The album cover shows Elma sitting on the miniature of the Visby City Wall near the Snäckgärdsporten

== Release ==
The first press limited edition contains Elma's diary and pictures of her maps tracing the land travelled by Amy.

Prior to the release of the album, music videos for titles "A Hole Opened Up in My Heart" on 24 June 2019, "Rain with Cappuccino" on 1 August 2019, and "Nautilus" on 27 August 2019 were also released.

== Track listing ==
All lyrics／music／arrangement by n-buna.

CD／digital download／streaming
No.	Title	Length
1.	"Train Window (車窓, Shasō) (Note: Tracks 1, 5, 10, and 13 are instrumental)"	1:55
2.	"Only Sorrow (憂一乗, Yū ichijō)"	4:32
3.	"Evening Calm、Somewhere、Fireworks (夕凪、某、花惑い, Yūnagi、Bō、Hana Madoi)"	3:18
4.	"Rain with Cappuccino (雨とカプチーノ, Ame to Kapuchiino)"	4:29
5.	"Lakeside Town (湖の街, Mizūmi no Machi)"	1:50
6.	"Dance of You (神様のダンス, Kamisama no Dansu) (Note: The literal translation for Kamisama no Dansu (神様のダンス) is "Dance of God" but the official published English is "Dance of You".)"	3:52
7.	"After the Rain (雨晴るる, Ame Haruru)"	3:42
8.	"Walk (歩く, Aruku)"	3:26
9.	"A Hole Opened Up in My Heart (心に穴が空いた, Kokoro ni Ana ga Aita)"	4:24
10.	"The Church in the Forest (森の教会, Mori no Kyōkai)"	1:59
11.	"Voice (声, Koe)"	4:48
12.	"Amy (エイミー, Eimi)"	3:32
13.	"Seabed、Moonlight (海底、月明かり, Kaitei、Tsukiakari)"	2:25
14.	"Nautilus (ノーチラス, Nochirasu) (Note: All tracks are written from Elma's perspective, with the exception of Nautilus written by Amy.)"	4:00
Total length:		48:12

Tower Records exclusive bonus CD
No.	Title	Length
1.	"Dance of You (神様のダンス, Kamisama no Dansu)" (music box version)	3:52
2.	"A Hole Opened Up in My Heart (心に穴が空いた, Kokoro ni Ana ga Aita)" (music box version)	4:24
3.	"Nautilus (ノーチラス, Nochirasu)" (music box version)	4:00

Village Vanguard exclusive bonus CD
No.	Title	Length
1.	"Rain with Cappuccino (雨とカプチーノ, Ame to Kapuchiino)" (music box version)	4:29
2.	"Ame Haruru (雨晴るる)" (music box version)	3:42
3.	"Amy (エイミー, Eimi)" (music box version)	3:32

== Usage ==
- "A Hole Opened Up in My Heart" was used in Teikyō Heisei University's TV commercial in 2019.
- "Nautilus" was used as the theme song for the 7th Kōshien Drama Award-winning Japanese drama Koto no Ha (言の葉) in 2020.

== Personnel ==
Main

- n-buna – lyrics, music, arrangement, guitar, piano, other instruments, and producer
- suis – vocals

Supporting

- Mitsuyasu Shimozuru (下鶴 光康, Shimozuru Mitsuyasu) – guitar
- Tatsuya Kitani (キタニ タツヤ, Kitani Tatsuya) – bass
- Masack – drums
- Tetsuya Hirahata (平畑 徹也, Hirahata Tetsuya) – piano, keyboards

Recording engineers／Producers

- Hideyuki Matsuhashi (松橋 秀幸, Matsuhashi Hideyuki) – recording engineer, mixing engineer
- Takuma Kase (加瀬 拓真, Kase Takuma) – assistant engineer
- Yasuyuki Kondō (近藤 康行, Kondō Yasuyuki) – recording supervisor
- Taku Nakamura (中村 卓, Nakamura Taku), Hideichi Kurita (栗田 秀一, Kurita Hideichi), Shoki Abe (阿部 祥紀, Abe Shoki) – executive producers
- Daigo Aonuma (青沼 大悟, Aonuma Daigo) – product manager
- Keisuke Matsuoka (松岡 恵介, Matsuoka Keisuke) – production manager／design management

Coordinators

- Anju Ikeda (池田 安寿, Ikeda Anju) – A&R
- Midori Shimizu (清水 美登里, Shimizu Midori) – artwork coordinator
- Naoko Iwasaki (岩崎 直子, Iwasaki Naoko) – sales promotion
- Takehide Ishiyama (石山 武秀, Ishiyama Takehide) – artist management

Art

- Popurika (ぽぷりか) – illustration
- DMYM/No.734 – art director, design

Studios

- Recording studios – Matsusuta (Tokyo, Japan), Volta Studio (Tokyo, Japan), Universal Music Studios (Tokyo, Japan)
- Mixing studio – Matsusuta Studio (Tokyo, Japan)
- Recorded／Mixed by Hideyuki Matsuhashi (松橋 秀幸, Matsuhashi Hideyuki), and Mastered by Yūji Chinone (茅根 裕司, Chinone Yūji) at Sony Music Studios (Tokyo, Japan)

== Charts ==
=== Weekly charts ===
Weekly chart performance for Elma
Chart (2019)	Peak position
Japanese Albums (Oricon)	3
Japanese Digital Albums (Oricon)	1
Japanese Hot Albums (Billboard Japan)	2

=== Year-end charts ===
2019 year-end chart performance for Elma
Chart (2019)	Position
Japanese Hot Albums (Billboard Japan)	77

2020 year-end chart performance for Elma
Chart (2020)	Position
Japanese Download Albums (Billboard Japan)	82

== Certifications ==
Certifications for Elma
Region	Certification	Certified units/sales
Japan (RIAJ)	Gold	100,000^{^}
^{^} Shipments figures based on certification alone.
