= The Summer Grass Is Getting in My Way =

EP (mini-album) by Yorushika
- Released: June 28, 2017
- Studio: Nasoundra Palace (Setagaya, Tokyo, Japan); ABS Recording (Shibuya, Tokyo, Japan)
- Genre: Rock
- Length: 24:50
- Language: Japanese
- Label: U&R records
- Producer: n-buna

Yorushika chronology
The Summer Grass Is Getting in My Way (2017)	A Loser Doesn't Need an Encore (2018)

The Summer Grass Is Getting in My Way (夏草が邪魔をする, Natsukusa ga Jama wo Suru) is the debut mini-album by Japanese rock duo Yorushika. It was released on June 28, 2017, by U&R records.

== Track listing ==
All lyrics, music, and arrangement by n-buna.

No.	Title	Length
1.	"Playing Piano in the Shadow of Summer (夏陰、ピアノを弾く, Natsu Kage、Piano wo Hiku)"	1:34
2.	"Cattleya (カトレア, Katorea)"	3:08
3.	"Say It. (言って。, Itte。)"	4:02
4.	"Blooming in that Summer (あの夏に咲け, Ano Natsu ni Sake)"	4:18
5.	"Flying Free (飛行, Hikō)"	1:30
6.	"Fireworks Beneath My Shoes (靴の花火, Kutsu no Hanabi)"	5:03
7.	"The Clouds and the Ghost (雲と幽霊, Kumo to Yūrei)"	5:15
Total length:		24:50

== Charts ==
Weekly chart performance for The Summer Grass Is Getting in My Way
Chart (2017)	Peak position
Japanese Albums (Oricon)	32
Japanese Hot Albums (Billboard Japan)	35
