= Plagiarism (disambiguation) =

Plagiarism is immoral appropriation in academia, journalism or the arts.

Plagiarism may also refer to:

- Plagiarism (Sparks album), 1997
- Plagiarism (EP), a six-track EP of covers by The Dillinger Escape Plan
- Plagiarism (Yorushika album), 2020
