= Plagiarism (Yorushika album) =

Studio album by Yorushika
- Released: July 29, 2020
- Studios: Matsusuta (Tokyo); Aobadai (Meguro, Tokyo); Volta (Tokyo); aLIVE Recording (Setagaya, Tokyo); ABS Recording (Shibuya, Tokyo); Sounduno (Minato, Tokyo)
- Genres: J-pop; rock; jazz
- Length: 45:59
- Language: Japanese
- Label: Universal J
- Producer: n-buna

Yorushika chronology
Elma (2019)	Plagiarism (2020)	Creation (2021)

Singles from Plagiarism
- 1. "Night Journey" Released: March 4, 2020; 2. "Ghost in a Flower" Released: April 22, 2020

Plagiarism (盗作, Tōsaku) is the third studio album by Japanese rock duo Yorushika. It was released on July 29, 2020, by Universal J. Following That's Why I Gave Up on Music, this was their second album to be released by a major label.

Like the previous two albums, it is also a concept album and depicts "the story of a man who plagiarizes music".

== Track listing ==
All lyrics, music, and arrangement by n-buna.

No.	Title	Length
1.	"Confession of Plagiarist (音楽泥棒の自白, Ongaku Dorobō no Jihaku) (Note: Tracks 1, 5, 8, and 12 are instrumental)"	1:12
2.	"Burglar (昼鳶, Hirutombi)"	2:42
3.	"Prostitution (春ひさぎ, Haru Hisagi)"	3:37
4.	"Bomber (爆弾魔, Bakudan Ma)" (re-recording)	3:35
5.	"Adolescent, Burglar (青年期、空き巣, Seinenki, Akisu)"	1:16
6.	"Replicant (レプリカント, Repurikanto)"	3:37
7.	"Flower and Badger Game (花人局, Hanamotase)"	5:32
8.	"Middle Age, Plagiarist (朱夏期、音楽泥棒, Ake Kaki, Ongaku Dorobō)"	1:48
9.	"Plagiarism (盗作, Tōsaku)"	3:59
10.	"Thoughtcrime (思想犯, Shisōhan)"	4:11
11.	"Escape (逃亡, Tōbō)"	4:47
12.	"Childhood, in Memories (幼年期、思い出の中, Yōnenki, Omoide no Naka)"	2:20
13.	"Night Journey (夜行, Yakō)" (Anime film A Whisker Away insert song)	3:20
14.	"Ghost in a Flower (花に亡霊, Hana ni Bōrei)" (Anime film A Whisker Away theme song)	4:01
Total length:		45:59

== Awards ==
Year	Award	Result	ref.
2021	13th CD Shop Awards	Won	

== Live tour ==
One year after the album's release, a live tour titled "Yorushika Live Tour 2021 "Plagiarism"" was held from August 1, 2021 to October 2, 2021 and the duo performed the songs from their album Plagiarism and EP Creation.

- Setlist
1. "Tsuioku" (追憶)
2. "Prostitution" (春ひさぎ, Haru Hisagi)
3. "Thoughtcrime" (思想犯, Shisōhan)
4. "Robbery and Bouquet" (強盗と花束, Gōtō to Hanataba)
5. "Basu o Orite" (バスを降りて)
6. "Burglar" (昼鳶, Hirutombi)
7. "Replicant" (レプリカント, Repurikanto)
8. "Flower and Badger Game" (花人局, Hanamotase)
9. "Yama no Sōgen" (山の草原)
10. "Escape" (逃亡, Tōbō)
11. "Eat the Wind" (風を食む, Kaze o Hamu)
12. "Night Journey" (夜行, Yakō)
13. "Liar" (嘘月, Usotsuki)
14. "Natsumatsuri" (夏祭り)
15. "Plagiarism" (盗作, Tōsaku)
16. "Bomber" (爆弾魔, Bakudan Ma)
17. "Spring Thief" (春泥棒, Haru Dorobō)
18. "Ghost in a Flower" (花に亡霊, Hana ni Bōrei)
19. "Zensei" (前世)
- Tracks 1, 5, 9, 14, and 19 are stories narrated by n-buna.

== Tie-ups ==
- "Plagiarism" was used in 2019 RPG game Final Fantasy Brave Exvius's TV commercial. Later, from December 23, 2020, instead of the original, a cover version of the song performed by Jun Shison and Mayu Matsuoka was used.
- "Night Journey" and "Ghost in a Flower" were used as insert and theme songs for the 2020 anime film A Whisker Away, respectively.

== Personnel ==
Main

- n-buna – lyrics, music, chorus, arrangement, guitar, piano, other instruments, and producer
- suis – vocals

Supporting

- Mitsuyasu Shimozuru (下鶴 光康, Shimozuru Mitsuyasu) – guitar
- Tatsuya Kitani (キタニ タツヤ, Kitani Tatsuya) – bass
- Masack – drums
- Tetsuya Hirahata (平畑 徹也, Hirahata Tetsuya) – piano, keyboards

Engineers／Directors／Producers

- Hideyuki Matsuhashi (松橋 秀幸, Matsuhashi Hideyuki) – recording engineer, mixing engineer
- Miyuki Nakamura (中村 美幸, Nakamura Miyuki), Kōki Miyata (宮田 昂輝, Miyata Kōki), Yōsuke Maeda (前田 洋佑, Maeda Yōsuke), Takuma Kase (加瀬 拓真, Kase Takuma), Akihiro Furuichi (古市 暁大, Furuichi Akihiro) – assistant engineers
- Yūji Chinone (茅根 裕司, Chinone Yūji) – mastering engineer
- Taku Nakamura (中村 卓, Nakamura Taku), Shoki Abe (阿部 祥紀, Abe Shoki), Hideichi Kurita (栗田 秀一, Kurita Hideichi) – executive producers

Coordinators

- Takehide Ishiyama (石山 武秀, Ishiyama Takehide), Hirohito Ametani (飴谷 嘉人, Ametani Hirohito) – artist management
- Anju Ikeda (池田 安寿, Ikeda Anju) – A&R
- Daigo Aonuma (青沼 大悟, Aonuma Daigo) – marketing planner
- Naoko Iwasaki (岩崎 直子, Iwasaki Naoko) – sales promotion
- Midori Shimizu (清水 美登里, Shimizu Midori) – artwork coordinator

Art

- DMYM/No.734 – art director, design
- Keisuke Matsuoka (松岡 恵介, Matsuoka Keisuke) – design management
- Tetsuya Nagato (永戸 鉄也, Nagato Tetsuya) – artwork

Studios

- Recording studios – Matsusuta Studio (Tokyo, Japan), Aobadai Studio (Meguro, Tokyo, Japan), Volta Studio (Tokyo, Japan), aLIVE Recording Studio (Setagaya, Tokyo, Japan), ABS Recording Studio (Shibuya, Tokyo, Japan), Sounduno Studio (Minato, Tokyo, Japan)
- Mixing studio – Matsusuta Studio (Tokyo, Japan)
- Mastered by Yūji Chinone (茅根 裕司, Chinone Yūji) at Sony Music Studios (Tokyo, Japan)

== Charts ==
=== Weekly charts ===
Weekly chart performance for Plagiarism
Chart (2019)	Peak position
Japanese Albums (Oricon)	3
Japanese Digital Albums (Oricon)	1
Japanese Hot Albums (Billboard Japan)	1

=== Year-end charts ===
Year-end chart performance for Plagiarism
Chart (2020)	Position
Japanese Hot Albums (Billboard Japan)	35

== Certifications ==
Certifications for Plagiarism
Region	Certification	Certified units/sales
Japan (RIAJ)	Gold	100,000^{^}
^{^} Shipments figures based on certification alone.
