= Sunny (Yorushika song) =

Single by Yorushika

from the album Second Person
- Language: Japanese
- Released: January 5, 2024
- Genre: J-pop; anime song
- Length: 4:30
- Label: Polydor
- Songwriter: N-buna
- Producer: N-buna

Yorushika singles chronology
"Moonbath" (2023)	"Sunny" (2024)	"Rubato" (2024)

Music video
- "Sunny" on YouTube

"Sunny" (Japanese: 晴る, Hepburn: Haru; lit. 'clear') is a song by Japanese rock duo Yorushika from their fifth studio album, Second Person (2026). It was released as a single by Polydor Records on January 5, 2024, and served as the second opening theme for the 2023 Japanese anime series Frieren: Beyond Journey's End.

Commercially, "Sunny" peaked at number 11 on the Oricon Combined Singles Chart and number eight on the Billboard Japan Hot 100, and received Double Platinum certification for streaming by the Recording Industry Association of Japan (RIAJ).

== Background and release ==
On December 22, 2023, following the release of Frieren's 16th episode, "Long-Lived Friends", a snippet of "Sunny" was used in Frieren's fourth trailer, revealing Yorushika to be in charge of the series' second opening theme. The song was available digitally on January 5, 2024, the same day as Frieren's 17th episode, "Take Care", premiered.

== Composition and reception ==
N-buna, a half-member of Yorushika and the songwriter, stated in a press release that "Sunny" is about "hoping for sunny days when the weather is not sunny." Ryōhei Ohara from Real Sound noted that the lyrics of the song are more abstract than Frieren's first opening theme, "Yūsha" by Yoasobi, but evaluated it as "a song that fits closely with the anime." Eriko Ishii of Real Sound was surprised by "the raw emotion expressed in the powerful words that come out of the chorus," and praised Suis's vocals as "not a voice that tells a story, but a voice that is determined to convey a strong message to the listener."

== Music video ==
An accompanying animated music video for "Sunny" premiered on March 5, 2024. It was directed by Kohta Morie, who previously worked on several of Yorushika's music videos. The visual was initially meant to premiere close to the song's release date, but following a request from Yorushika to not compromise on the quality, the release was pushed back two months. Inspired by Haruki Murakami's 1985 novel Hard-Boiled Wonderland and the End of the World, the story depicts a child and his father living in a town surrounded by impenetrable wall. A special version of the music video, featuring footage from the Frieren anime, was uploaded on March 29.

== Other uses ==
A rearranged version of "Sunny" was used for Suntory Gin's Sui online commercial "Sui to Utaeba".

== Accolades ==
Awards and nominations for "Sunny"
Ceremony	Year	Award	Result	Ref.
AnimaniA Awards	2025	Best Anime Song	Nominated	
Anime Grand Prix	2024	Best Theme Song	10th place	
Music Awards Japan	2025	Best of Listeners' Choice: Japanese Song	Nominated	

== Charts ==
=== Weekly charts ===
Weekly chart performance for "Sunny"
Chart (2024)	Peak position
Japan (Japan Hot 100)	8
Japan Hot Animation (Billboard Japan)	3
Japan Combined Singles (Oricon)	11

=== Year-end charts ===
2024 year-end chart performance for "Sunny"
Chart (2024)	Position
Japan (Japan Hot 100)	22
Japan Hot Animation (Billboard Japan)	7
Japan Digital Singles (Oricon)	6

2025 year-end chart performance for "Sunny"
Chart (2025)	Position
Japan (Japan Hot 100)	98

== Certifications ==
Certifications for "Sunny"
Region	Certification	Certified units/sales
Japan (RIAJ)	Gold	100,000^{*}
Streaming
Japan (RIAJ)	2× Platinum	200,000,000^{†}
^{*} Sales figures based on certification alone.^{†} Streaming-only figures based on certification alone.
