= Just a Sunny Day for You =

Song by Yorushika

from the EP A Loser Doesn't Need an Encore
- Language: Japanese
- Released: May 4, 2018
- Genre: J-pop; rock
- Length: 3:18
- Label: U＆R
- Songwriter: N-buna
- Producer: N-buna

Music video
- "Just a Sunny Day for You" on YouTube

"Just a Sunny Day for You" (ただ君に晴れ, Tada Kimi ni Hare) is a song by Japanese rock band Yorushika. The music video was released on May 4, 2018. The song appears on their second mini-album, Makeinu ni Encore wa Iranai, released by U&R Records on May 9, 2018.

It was used as the background music for the opening video of the event Goodbye, Tarinai Futari ~Let's Meet at Minato Mirai~, which was held in December 2019.

As of August 2020, the music video on YouTube has been viewed over 100 million times.

In October 2020, the song's cumulative number of plays on streaming services exceeded 100 million (according to Billboard JAPAN). It became Yorushika's first song to exceed 100 million streams.

== Certification and sales ==
Region	Certification	Certified units/Sales
Japan (RIAJ)	Double Platinum	200,000,000*
*Sales figures based on certification alone.
