= Snake (Yorushika song) =

Single by Yorushika

from the album Second Person
- Language: Japanese
- Released: January 17, 2025
- Genre: J-pop
- Length: 4:16
- Label: Polydor
- Songwriter: N-buna
- Producer: N-buna

Yorushika singles chronology
"Sun" (2024)	"Snake" (2025)	"Martian" (2025)

Music video
- "Snake" on YouTube

"Snake" (Japanese: へび, Hepburn: Hebi) is a song by Japanese duo Yorushika from their fifth studio album, Second Person. It was released as a digital single by Polydor Records on January 17, 2025. The song, inspired by a passage from "Li-Sui" (Di-Thoughts) by the Tang Dynasty poet Yuan Zhen, was used as the ending theme for the NHK General TV anime series Orb: On the Movements of the Earth.

== Background ==
On January 8, 2025, Yorushika announced that the new ending theme for the TV anime Orb: On the Movements of the Earth would be "Snake". This song was used from the 16th episode that aired on the 11th of the same month. (Note: Aporia was used until episode 15) N-buna explained that one day he saw a snake with beautiful scales, and felt an affinity with the anime when he was writing a song about snakes. He explained that "the famous composition of a man eating the fruit of knowledge and a snake tempting him in the Bible can be interpreted as a metaphor for a simple desire for knowledge", and that he wrote "a song about a snake waking up from its sleep in the spring and crawling out to learn about the world". Additionally, N-buna cited a passage from the Tang Dynasty poet Yuan Zhen 's "Leave Thoughts" as the source of this work.

Once upon a time,
the sea was too difficult to cross,
so the water was no longer difficult. Now that
the mountains have been removed, this is no longer a cloud.

The lyrics include the spring seasonal word "mug wort" and the summer seasonal word "wood sorrel", and also describe the four seasons.

== Promotion ==
On January 8, 2025, the second promotional video for the anime Orb: On the Movements of the Earth was released, revealing a portion of the work. On the 12th and 17th of the same month, it was announced that it would be released as a digital single . On the same day as this announcement, the non-credit ending video was also released .

On February 25, the music video, created by animation artist Sato Miyo, was released . Sato explained that the meaning of "Wushan" in the lyrics and her own image of a snake combined to bring to mind "an image of a man and a woman." She expressed the memories and scenery that remain beautiful in the couple's minds through sand paintings and paint – on – glass animation.

== Reactions and reviews ==
Released on January 29, 2025, it debuted at number 10 on the Billboard Japan Hot Animation charts .

In the music magazine Rockin'On Japan (March 2025 issue), writer Mie Sugiura mentioned that this work is based on a stanza of Won Chung 's poem, and wondered how far n-buna's "knowledge" extends, and could only be envious of his rich literary knowledge. And suis' (Vo) singing voice, which expresses the beauty, modesty, and sadness of the snake, is outstandingly wonderful. She described this voice, which expresses quiet lyricism, as being one of a kind.

== Credit ==
Sources

- Suis – vocals
- N-buna – lyrics, composition, arrangement, guitar, chorus
- Mitsuyasu Shimotsuru – guitar
- Tatsuya Kitani – bass
- Masack – drums
- Tetsuya Hirahata – piano

== Charts ==
Chart performance for "Snake"
Chart (2025)	Highest rank
Japan (Japan Hot 100)	43
Japan Hot Animation (Billboard Japan)	10
Japan Digital Singles (Oricon)	10
