= Night Journey (song) =

"Yakou"

Single by Yorushika
- Language: Japanese
- English title: Night Journey
- Released: March 4, 2020
- Genre: J-pop; rock
- Length: 3:24
- Songwriter: Universal J
- Producer: N-buna

Yorushika singles chronology
"A Hole Opened Up in My Heart" (2020)	"Yakou" (2020)	"Ghost in a Flower" (2021)

Music video
- "Night Journey" on YouTube

"Yakou" (夜行, Night Journey) is a song by Japanese rock band Yorushika . It was released as their second digitally-only single by Universal Japan on March 4, 2020. On the same day, the music video for the song, produced by Studio Colorido, was posted on their YouTube channel .

On April 10, 2020, it was announced that the song would be used as an insert song for the feature-length animation series "Nakitai Watashi wa Neko wo Kaburu".

== Charts ==
Peak chart position for "Night Journey"
Chart (2020)	Position
Japan (Japan Hot 100)	39

== In popular culture ==
Insert song for the feature-length animation "I Want to Cry, I Wear a Cat"
