= Kyosuke Usuta =

Japanese manga artist

- Area: Manga artist
- Notable works: Sexy Commando Gaiden: Sugoi yo!! Masaru-san, Pyu to Fuku! Jaguar

Kyosuke Usuta (うすた 京介, Usuta Kyōsuke; born May 25, 1974 in Aichi Prefecture but raised in Kōshi, Kumamoto) is a Japanese manga artist. His best known works are Sexy Commando Gaiden: Sugoi yo!! Masaru-san which was published in Weekly Shōnen Jump from 1995 to 1997 and which was adapted into a 48-episode anime series produced by Magic Bus; and Pyu to Fuku! Jaguar which was also serialized in Weekly Shōnen Jump between 2000 and 2010, adapted into an anime film and a live action film in 2008.

== Works ==
Title	Year	Notes	Refs
Sexy Commando Gaiden: Sugoi yo!! Masaru-san	1995–1997	Serialized in Weekly Shōnen Jump; Published by Shueisha in 7 volumes	
Bushizawa reshību (武士沢レシーブ, Bushizawa Receive)	1999	Published by Shueisha, 2 volumes	
Chikusakukōru (チクサクコール, Chikusaku Call)	2001	Serialized in Weekly Shonen Jump; Published by Shueisha, 1 volume short stories collection	
Pyu to Fuku! Jaguar	2000–10	Serialized in Weekly Shōnen Jump; Published by Shueisha in 20 volumes	
Foodfighter Tabelu	2015–2017	Published by Shueisha, 7 volumes	
