= Pyū to Fuku! Jaguar =

Japanese manga series

- Seventh tankōbon volume cover

ピューと吹く!ジャガー
- Genre: Action; Comedy; Musical
- Manga
- Written by: Kyosuke Usuta
- Published by: Shueisha
- Imprint: Jump Comics
- Magazine: Weekly Shōnen Jump
- Original run: August 22, 2000 – August 23, 2010
- Volumes: 20
- Original video animation
- Directed by: Frogman
- Studio: Kaeruotoko Shokai
- Released: November 19, 2007 – January 21, 2008
- Episodes: 3
- Live-action film

Pyū to Fuku! Jaguar: The Movie
- Directed by: Makkoi Saitou
- Studio: Office Crescendo
- Released: January 12, 2008
- Runtime: 99 minutes
- Original video animation

Pyū to Fuku! Jaguar: Return of Yaku Ichinenburi
- Directed by: Frogman
- Studio: Kaeruotoko Shokai
- Released: December 8, 2008 – February 23, 2009
- Episodes: 3
- Anime film

Pyū to Fuku! Jaguar: Ima, Fuki ni Yukimasu
- Directed by: Frogman
- Studio: Kaeruotoko Shokai
- Released: January 10, 2009
- Runtime: 78 minutes
- icon

Pyū to Fuku! Jaguar (Japanese: ピューと吹く! ジャガー, Hepburn: Pyū to Fuku! Jagā; lit. 'Flute-Blower! Jaguar') is a Japanese gag manga series written and illustrated by Kyosuke Usuta. The story is about Kiyohiko "Piyohiko" Saketome, an aspiring musician whose daily life takes a bizarre turn when he meets Jaguar, an eccentric man obsessed with recorders. It was serialized in Shueisha's shōnen manga magazine Weekly Shōnen Jump from August 2000 to August 2010, with its chapters collected in 20 tankōbon volumes. It was adapted into a series of Flash-original video animations (OVAs) and a film, released from 2007 to 2009. A live-action film, starring Jun Kaname as Jaguar, was released in January 2008.

== Plot ==
The story starts out with Kiyohiko "Piyohiko" Saketome trying to take a band audition. In his way he sees a strange man named Jaguar carrying a big case, which turns out to be holding only a small recorder. Piyohiko tries not to get distracted by him but fails, because when Jaguar plays his recorder, the most beautiful, passionate guitar-like sound comes out of it. He tries more and more record companies, but every time he meets Jaguar and somehow manages to miss his audition. Finally, Piyohiko gets accepted at a record company only to find out that he will be staying at his new dorm with Jaguar as his roommate. Jaguar becomes a teacher and sets up a recorder class at their music school, and Piyohiko somehow ends up in that class instead of the guitar class he wanted. From thereon in, the story is an episodic chronicle of Piyohiko and Jaguar's lives, where they get into hijinks with fellow musicians and other bizarre characters.

== Characters ==
Jaguar Junichi (ジャガージュン市, Jagā Jun'ichi)
Voiced by: Keiji Fujiwara
Portrayed by: Jun Kaname
Jaguar is a peculiar resident of Gari Dormitories, where he runs a recorder class and shares a room with Piyohiko. A musical prodigy, he masters any instrument effortlessly, and his performances evoke vivid imagery—even mimicking a guitar on the recorder. Despite his apathetic teaching style and seemingly aimless existence, he possesses an uncanny ability to sway others and remain unfazed by conflict, contrasting with his hapless roommate, Hammer. Jaguar was once among children subjected to brainwashing experiments at the Hotel Riverside Laboratory (known as Softcream), intended to forge a world-changing band. A dissenting scientist, whom Jaguar considers his father, freed them.
Kiyohiko Saketome (酒留清彦, Saketome Kiyohiko) / Piyohiko (ピヨ彦)
Voiced by: Junichi Kanemaru
Portrayed by: Manabu Ōmura
Piyohiko is a normal man who dreams of being a great guitarist. Even though he thinks flutes are lame, he is in the Flute Class (mostly because of Jaguar) and, ironically, his family owns a flute shop (and his father is as weird as Jaguar).
Hammer (ハマー, Hamā) / Hiromitsu Hamawatari (浜渡 浩満, Hamawatari Hiromitsu)
Voiced by: Katsuyuki Konishi
Portrayed by: Hiroaki Ogi
A Hip hop ninja who lives in the attic above Jaguar and Piyohiko's room. He wants more than anything to be cool and popular, but goes about it in a way that always ends in failure and humiliation. He is known for ending his sentences with "Yo", adding -dono to people's names, and referring to himself in the first person as Sessha (拙者, an archaic word for "I"). Despite this he refuses to admit he is a ninja, because it would be bad for his trendy image.
Takana Shirakawa (白川高菜, Shirakawa Takana)
Voiced by: Izumi Kasagi
Portrayed by: Mai Takahashi
A female student who once belonged to the Idol department before joining the flute department. She is also the internet idol Chim Li (チムリー) and is highly self-conscious. When she is talked to by others, she abuses or hits them because she is very shy. Since she is good at her way of abusing, she tends to act as a sadist automatically. As a result, she will please those whom she abused.
Porgy (ポギー, Pogī) / Wataru Hogi (保木 渡流, Hogi Wataru)
Voiced by: Mitsuaki Madono
Bassist and lyricist in the popular band July (ジュライ, Jurai). He likes to show off his poetry skills to his squealing fangirls. After meeting Jaguar, though, he is never the same again. Jaguar destroys Porgy's confidence in his poetry by first beating him in a poetry contest, then telling him that his poems are nothing but pretty lies. Porgy becomes unable to write and is kicked out of July, eventually spending his life stalking Jaguar and challenging him to poetry contests as his masked alter-ego Wrestler Mask (レスラー仮面, Resuraa Kamen). He is also trying to get back his position in July, but they have already replaced him with a new bassist.
Billy (ビリー, Birī)
Voiced by: Yūji Ueda
A man who looks like a typical delinquent, with a regent hairstyle. He is aggressive toward Jaguar and his friends, but is really a soft-hearted guy who is just lonely and friendless. He is Hamidento's guardian and tries to be a good father, but does not notice that Hamii does not appreciate it. Like Hammer, he strives to get attention but fails miserably.
Hamidento (ハミデント, Hamidento) / Hamī (ハミー)
Voiced by: Yūji Ueda
A cute little robot under the care of Billy. He does not acknowledge Billy as a parent at all, and while he pretends to be cute and loveable around him, a mean side of him comes out when Billy is not around. He smokes and sometimes acts like a teenage delinquent, and has everyone he knows ranked in order of respect. Jaguar is inexplicably high on the list, Hammer is always on the bottom. He also has amazing fighting power. Hamii is the series' mascot character.
Chichijirou Saketome (酒留父字郎, Saketome Chichijirō)
Piyohiko's father, a maker of weird and rare flutes. Is close buddies with Jaguar due to their shared interest in flutes and desire to make Piyohiko play them. Piyohiko's dislike of flutes is most likely because of his father, who hopes for him to take over his business. Chichijirou is so laughably uncreative when designing flutes that to him, every one of Piyohiko's average ideas seems like a stroke of genius.
Michael (間池留, Maikeru)
A mysterious Caucasian man whom Jaguar treats as his father. His name is written Ma-ike-ru, with Japanese characters for "between", "pond" and "stop". He sometimes turns transparent, and there are many not-so-subtle hints that he is a ghost. Jaguar believes his "father" is Japanese, and most certainly not a ghost.

== Media ==
=== Manga ===
Written and illustrated by Kyosuke Usuta, Pyū to Fuku! Jaguar was serialized in Shueisha's shōnen manga magazine Weekly Shōnen Jump from August 22, 2000, (Note: It debuted in the magazine's 38th issue of 2000 (cover date September 4), released on August 22 of that same year.) to August 23, 2010. Shueisha collected its 435 individual chapters in 20 tankōbon volumes published from September 4, 2001, to December 3, 2010.

==== Volumes ====
No.	Release date	ISBN
01	September 4, 2001	978-4-08-873164-3
02	January 5, 2002	978-4-08-873214-5
03	June 4, 2002	978-4-08-873276-3
04	December 4, 2002	978-4-08-873353-1
05	June 4, 2003	978-4-08-873422-4
06	December 4, 2003	978-4-08-873538-2
07	June 4, 2004	978-4-08-873611-2
08	December 3, 2004	978-4-08-873684-6
09	June 3, 2005	978-4-08-873819-2
10	December 2, 2005	978-4-08-873885-7
11	June 2, 2006	978-4-08-874109-3
12	February 2, 2007	978-4-08-874317-2
13	July 4, 2007	978-4-08-874384-4
14	January 4, 2008	978-4-08-874466-7
15	July 4, 2008	978-4-08-874542-8
16	February 4, 2009	978-4-08-874617-3
17	July 3, 2009	978-4-08-874703-3
18	January 4, 2010	978-4-08-874786-6
19	July 2, 2010	978-4-08-870073-1
20	December 3, 2010	978-4-08-870147-9

=== Video games ===
Two video games based on the series have been released by Konami. The first game, Pyū to Fuku! Jaguar: Ashita no Jump, is an RPG for the PlayStation 2 released on March 18, 2004. Pyū to Fuku! Jaguar: Byō to Daru! Megane-kun (ピューと吹く！ジャガー 〜ビョ〜と出る！メガネくん〜), an action game for the Game Boy Advance, was released on April 29 of the same year.

Characters from Jaguar have also appeared in the Nintendo DS game Jump Super Stars and its sequel Jump Ultimate Stars, with Jaguar featured as a playable character in both games.

Jaguar Junichi appears as a support character in J-Stars Victory VS, a fighting game for the PlayStation 4, PlayStation 3, and PlayStation Vita. Its European and North American release marks the first release of Pyu to Fuku! Jaguar material outside Japan. The English title of the manga is officially given in the game as Phwoo! Blows the Jaguar.

=== Original video animation ===
A 3-episode Flash-animated original video animation series produced by Kaeruotoko Shokai was released from November 19, 2007, to January 21, 2008. Another 3-episode original video animation titled Pyū to Fuku! Jaguar: Return of Yaku Ichinenburi (ピューと吹く! ジャガー リターン・オブ・約1年ぶり, Pyū to fuku! Jagā ritān Obu yaku 1-nen-buri) was released from December 8, 2008, to February 23, 2009.

=== Live-action film ===
A live-action film was released on January 12, 2008. The DVD was released on June 23, 2008.

=== Anime film ===
An anime film titled Pyū to Fuku! Jaguar: Ima, Fuki ni Yukimasu (ピューと吹く! ジャガー ～いま, 吹きにゆきます～) was released on January 10, 2009. The end credits music used for the film was "No You Girls", known in Japan as "Katherine: Girls Never Know" (キャサリン～ガールズ・ネヴァー・ノウ～), by Franz Ferdinand.
