= Yorushika =

Japanese musical duo

- Yorushika's logo

Background information
- Origin: Japan
- Genres: J-pop; rock; indie pop; jazz
- Years active: 2017–present
- Labels: Universal J; Polydor
- Members: N-buna; Suis
- Website: yorushika.com

Yorushika (Japanese: ヨルシカ) is a Japanese rock duo founded in 2017. The group is composed of N-buna, a Vocaloid producer, and Suis, a female vocalist. They are known for their juxtaposition of "passionate" and "upbeat" production and instrumentation fused with heavier lyrical content, which often explores ideas such as love and human emotion and draws from works of literature including Masuji Ibuse and Jules Verne.

The duo is extremely secretive, never publicly revealing their faces. N-buna stated that he does not want the creator to take precedence over the work.

== Name ==
The name "Yorushika" is taken from a lyric in their song "The Clouds and the Ghost", "yoru shika mō nemurezu ni" (夜しかもう眠れずに; meaning "now without being able to sleep except at night"). The eye-designed logo mark is a motif of two moons facing each other and also serves as a clock hand, portraying the time "from 6:00 to night".

== History ==
Prior to the formation of Yorushika, N-buna already had a sizeable following on Niconico, a Japanese video hosting website, first releasing vocaloid music on the platform in 2012. His 2013 song "Tōmei Elegy" (透明エレジー) reached first on the platform's daily vocaloid ranking. Additionally, he has produced two albums through U&R records, a subsidiary of Niconico's owner Dwango.

According to an interview with Natalie, N-buna and Suis met through a common acquaintance; Suis was a longtime fan of N-buna's vocaloid work. Suis first appeared as a guest vocalist during N-buna's two solo concerts in Tokyo. N-buna reached out to Suis to form Yorushika as part of N-buna's effort to find a "more human" voice to use in his music, as opposed to vocaloid. Since then, the two have released three extended plays and three full albums, all of which charted on both the Oricon Albums Chart and the Billboard Japan Hot 100 Albums Chart. Yorushika's popularity grew explosively, with critics noting that the lyrics seemed to strike a chord with younger audiences. Additionally, the song "Just a Sunny Day for You" (ただ君に晴れ, Tada Kimi ni Hare) became popular on the video app TikTok.

As of May 2023, their faces and detailed profiles have not been disclosed, as they want their audiences to listen to their music without "preconceptions". They have hosted live performances before, but the etiquette of concerts in Japan is a strict no-image policy unless told otherwise. In their live performances, they often use backlighting on stage to obscure their faces, further enforcing their anonymity.

In 2020, they provided the theme song "Ghost in a Flower" (花に亡霊, Hana ni Bōrei), the insert song "Night Journey" (夜行, Yakō), and the ending song "Liar" (嘘月, Uso Tsuki; lit. 'Lying Moon'), for the animated film A Whisker Away.

In 2022, they provided the theme song "Left-Right Confusion" (左右盲, Sayūmō) for the movie Even If This Love Disappears from the World Tonight and "The Fruits of the Earth" (チノカテ, Chinokate) for the Japanese TV drama Renovation like Magic (魔法のリノベ, Mahō no Rinobe).

In 2023, they provided the song "Setting Sun" (斜陽, Shayō), the opening theme song for the first season of the anime series The Dangers in My Heart, and the song "Telepath" (テレパス, Terepasu), the opening theme song for the anime series Kaina of the Great Snow Sea.

In 2024, Yorushika provided the song "Sunny" (晴る, Haru), the second opening theme song for the anime series Frieren: Beyond Journey's End, Yorushika also participated in a tribute album for the band Creep_Hyp, where they covered the song "Yū, Sansan" (憂、燦々), They also provided the song "Aporia" (アポリア), as the ending theme song for the anime series Orb: On the Movements of the Earth. Additionally, they have released the song titled "Sun" (太陽, Taiyou), which serves as the theme song for the movie Shotai, directed by Michihito Fujii.

In 2025, Yorushika contributed the song "Snake" as the second ending theme for the anime Orb: On the Movements of the Earth. They also performed the song "Martian" (火星人), which serves as the opening theme for the second season of the Shōshimin Series adaptation. They also provided the song "Playsick" (プレイシック, Pureishikku), serving as the soundtrack for a Daihatsu commercial video, titled "To the Sea". They also provided the song "Shura" (修羅), as the theme song for a drama series called We still don't know the school rules of that planet.

In 2026, Suis collaborated with Eve for the song “Anthem of Wind” (風のアンセム, Kaze no Anthem), as the opening theme for the anime Witch Hat Atelier. Yorushika also provided the song "Bubble" (あぶく, Abuku) as the opening for the anime adaptation of Liar Game. They also released the song “I’m the Only One Who Breaks Through the Clouds and Goes Downwind” (雲を抜け風下へ私だけ, Kumo wo Nuke Kazeshita e Watashi Dake), serving as the first opening theme of the third season of the anime The Apothecary Diaries.

== Members ==
- N-buna – vocals, acoustic and electric guitars, mandolin, synthesizer, piano (studio only), other instruments (studio only), lyrics, arrangement, production
- Suis – vocals

Current supporting members

- Mitsuyasu Shimozuru – acoustic and electric guitars, live backing vocals (2017-present)
- Masack – drums, percussion, live backing vocals (2017-present)
- Tetsuya Hirahata – keyboards, accordion, live backing vocals (2017-present)

Former supporting members

- Tatsuya Kitani – acoustic and electric bass guitars, live backing vocals (2017-2026)

== Discography ==
=== Studio albums ===
List of studio albums, with selected details, chart positions and certifications
Title	Details	Peak chart positions			Certifications
Title	Details	JPN	JPN Cmb.	JPN Hot	Certifications
That's Why I Gave Up on Music	Released: April 10, 2019; Label: U&R; Formats: CD, digital download, streaming	5	4	5	
Elma	Released: August 28, 2019; Label: Universal J; Formats: CD, digital download, streaming	3	3	2	RIAJ: Gold (phy.)
Plagiarism	Released: July 29, 2020; Label: Universal J; Formats: CD, digital download, streaming	2	1	1	RIAJ: Gold (phy.)
Magic Lantern	Released: April 5, 2023; Label: Polydor; Formats: Art book, digital download, streaming	—	19	5	
Second Person	Released: March 4, 2026; Label: Polydor; Formats: Digital download, streaming	—	7	2	
"—" denotes releases that did not chart.

=== Extended plays ===
List of extended plays, with selected details and chart positions
Title	Details	Peak chart positions		
Title	Details	JPN	JPN Cmb.	JPN Hot
The Summer Grass Is Getting in My Way (Note: Classified as "mini-album".)	Released: June 28, 2017; Label: U&R; Formats: CD, DL, streaming	32	—	35
A Loser Doesn't Need an Encore	Released: May 9, 2018; Label: U&R; Formats: CD, DL, streaming	5	29	6
Creation	Released: January 27, 2021; Label: Universal J; Formats: CD, DL, streaming	4	4	4
"—" denotes releases that did not chart.

=== Singles ===
List of singles, with selected chart positions, showing year released, certifications and album name
Title	Year	Peak chart positions			Certifications	Album
Title	Year	JPN	JPN Cmb.	JPN Hot	Certifications	Album
"Hole in the Heart" (心に穴が空いた)	2019	—	—	44		Elma
"Night Journey" (夜行)	2020	—	—	39		Plagiarism
"Ghost in a Flower" (花に亡霊)	2020	—	10	6	RIAJ: Gold (dig.); 2× Platinum (st.)	Plagiarism
"Prostitution" (春ひさぎ)	2020	—	38	23		Plagiarism
"Thoughtcrime" (思想犯)	2020	—	35	25	RIAJ: Gold (st.)	Plagiarism
"Eat the Wind" (風を食む)	2020	—	—	49		Creation
"Spring Thief" (春泥棒)	2021	—	27	23	RIAJ: Gold (dig.); 2× Platinum (st.)	Creation
"Matasaburō" (又三郎)	2021	—	35	17	RIAJ: Gold (st.)	Magic Lantern
"The Old Man and the Sea" (老人と海)	2021	—	—	43		Magic Lantern
"Howl at the Moon" (月に吠える)	2021	—	—	31		Magic Lantern
"Bremen" (ブレーメン)	2022	12	—	22		Magic Lantern
"Left-Right Confusion" (左右盲)	2022	—	31	11	RIAJ: Gold (st.)	Magic Lantern
"Chinokate" (チノカテ)	2022	—	—	27		Magic Lantern
"Telepath" (テレパス)	2023	—	—	—		Non-album singles
"Algernon" (アルジャーノン)	2023	—	24	16	RIAJ: Gold (st.)	Magic Lantern
"451"	2023	—	—	—		Magic Lantern
"Setting Sun" (斜陽)	2023	—	44	31	RIAJ: Gold (st.)	Non-album single
"Moonbath" (月光浴)	2023	—	—	89		Second Person
"Sunny" (晴る)	2024	—	11	8	RIAJ: Gold (dig.); 2× Platinum (st.)	Second Person
"Rubato" (ルバート)	2024	12	—	65		Second Person
"Forget It" (忘れてください)	2024	—	49	36	RIAJ: Gold (st.)	Second Person
"Aporia" (アポリア)	2024	—	42	31	RIAJ: Gold (st.)	Second Person
"Sun" (太陽)	2024	—	—	35		Second Person
"Snake" (へび)	2025	—	—	43		Second Person
"Martian" (火星人)	2025	—	26	20		Second Person
"Shura" (修羅)	2025	—	—	33		Second Person
"Play Sick" (プレイシック)	2025	—	—	53		Second Person
"Madder" (茜)	2026	—	—	41		Non-album singles
"Bubble" (あぶく)	2026	—	38	21		Non-album singles
"Beyond the Clouds, Only Me Downwind" (雲を抜け風下へ私だけ)	2026	—	48	20		Non-album singles
"—" denotes releases that did not chart.

==== Promotional singles ====
List of promotional singles, with selected chart positions, showing year released, certifications and album name
Title	Year	Peak chart positions	Certifications	Album
Title	Year	JPN Hot	Certifications	Album
"Deep Indigo" (藍二乗)	2018	—	RIAJ: Gold (st.)	That's Why I Gave Up on Music
"Parade" (パレード)	2019	—		That's Why I Gave Up on Music
"Rain with Cappuccino" (雨とカプチーノ)	2019	95	RIAJ: Platinum (st.)	Elma
"Plagiarism" (盗作)	2020	30		Plagiarism
"—" denotes releases that did not chart.

=== Other charted and certified songs ===
List of other charted and certified songs, with selected chart positions, showing year released, certifications and album name
Title	Year	Peak chart positions		Certifications	Album
Title	Year	JPN Cmb.	JPN Hot	Certifications	Album
"Say It" (言って。)	2017	—	—	RIAJ: Platinum (st.)	The Summer Grass Is Getting in My Way
"A Loser Doesn't Need an Encore" (負け犬にアンコールはいらない)	2018	—	—	RIAJ: Gold (st.)	A Loser Doesn't Need an Encore
"Hitchcock" (ヒッチコック)	2018	—	—	RIAJ: Platinum (st.)	A Loser Doesn't Need an Encore
"Just a Sunny Day for You" (ただ君に晴れ)	2018	36	22	RIAJ: 2× Platinum (st.)	A Loser Doesn't Need an Encore
"That's Why I Gave Up on Music" (だから僕は音楽を辞めた)	2019	33	20	RIAJ: 2× Platinum (st.)	That's Why I Gave Up on Music
"Nautilus" (ノーチラス)	2019	—	62		Elma
"Miyakoochi" (都落ち)	2023	—	91		Magic Lantern
"Yū, Sansan" (憂、燦々)	2024	30	31		Moshi mo Umarekawattanara Sotto Konna Koe ni Natte
"Darma Grand Prix"	2025	13	12		Dear Jubilee: Radwimps Tribute
"Plover" (千鳥)	2026	—	34		Second Person
"—" denotes releases that did not chart.

== Videography ==
=== Video albums ===
List of video albums, with selected details and chart positions
Title	Details	Peak chart positions	
Title	Details	JPN DVD	JPN BD
Yorushika Live "Zense"	Released: May 26, 2021; Label: Sony Japan; Formats: DVD, BD	3	5
Yorushika Live "Gekkō"	Released: June 29, 2022; Label: Sony Japan; Formats: DVD, BD	5	3
Yorushika Live "Moon and Cat Dance"	Released: September 18, 2024; Label: Sony Japan; Formats: DVD, BD	2	5
Yorushika Live 2024 "Zense"	Released: June 25, 2025; Label: Sony Japan; Formats: DVD, BD	5	6

=== Music videos ===
List of music videos, showing year released and directors
Title	Year	Director(s)
"Fireworks Beneath My Shoes"	2017	Second Origami
"Say It"	2017	Ootori
"Semi-Transparent Boy"	2018	Minakata Laboratory
"Hitchcock"	2018	Ootori
"Just a Sunny Day for You"	2018	Popurika
"The Clouds and the Ghost"	2018	Popurika
"Deep Indigo"	2018	Popurika
"Parade"	2019	Ootori
"That's Why I Gave Up on Music"	2019	Popurika; Magotsuki
"A Hole Opened Up in My Heart"	2019	Kawasaki Kenji
"Rain with Cappuccino"	2019	Popurika
"Nautilus"	2019	Kohta Morie
"Night Journey"	2020	Hiroshi Kamebuchi
"Ghost in a Flower"	2020	Popurika
"Prostitution"	2020	Takuya Katsumi
"Thought Crime"	2020	Rabbit Machine
"Plagiarism"	2020	Tetsuya Nagato
"Eat the Wind"	2020	Kyotaro Hayashi
"Spring Thief"	2021	Kohta Morie
"Matasaburō"	2021	Takuya Katsumi
"Howl at the Moon"	2021	Ryu Kato
"Bremen"	2022	Rabbit Machine
"Left-Right Confusion"	2022	Kohta Morie
"The Fruits of the Earth"	2022	Ryo Ichikawa
"Telepath"	2023	Rabbit Machine
"Algernon"	2023	Takuro Oishi
"Miyakōchi"	2023	Atsuyo Kanamori
"Setting Sun"	2023	Yutaro Kubo
"The First Night"	2023	Ryu Kato
"Moonbath"	2023	Yutaro Kubo
"Sunny"	2024	Kohta Morie
"Forget It"	2024	MimicryMeta
"Aporia"	2024	Ryu Kato
"Sun"	2024	Tetsuya Nagato; Yasuhiko Shimizu
"Snake"	2025	Satou Miyo
"Martian"	2025	N-Buna; Kohta Morie
"Shura"	2025	N-Buna
"August, A Certain Place, Moonlight"	2025	DMYM/No.734
"Plover"	2026	Kohta Morie
"Paddle"	2026	Ryu Kato
"Madder"	2026	Yoshiki Imazu
"Bubble"	2026	MimicryMeta

== Concerts ==
Tours

- Moonlight Live Tour (2019)
- Plagiarism Live Tour (2021)
- Moonlight Re-enactment Live Tour (2022)
- Zense Live (2023)
- Moon and Cat Dance Live Tour (2023)
- Zense Live (2024)
- Plagiarism Re-enactment Live Tour (2025)
- First Person Live Tour (2026)

One-off

- Summer Grass Gets in the Way Live (2017)
- Zense Live (2021)
- Moon and Cat Dance Live (2024)

== Awards and nominations ==
Name of the award ceremony, year presented, award category, nominee(s) of the award, and the result of the nomination
Award ceremony	Year	Category	Nominee(s)/work(s)	Result	Ref.
Japan Gold Disc Award	2020	Best 5 New Artists	Yorushika	Won	
MTV Europe Music Awards	2020	Best Japanese Act	Yorushika	Nominated	
Space Shower Music Awards	2021	Best Pop Artist	Yorushika	Nominated	
CD Shop Awards	2021	Grand Prize (Red)	Plagiarism	Nominated	
CD Shop Awards	2021	Finalist Award	Plagiarism	Won	
Music Awards Japan	2025	Best of Listeners' Choice: Japanese Song Powered by Spotify	"Sunny"	Nominated	
Music Awards Japan	2026	Best Song Award	"Haru"	Nominated	
Music Awards Japan	2026	Best Artist Award	Yorushika	Nominated	
