= That's Why I Gave Up on Music =

Studio album by Yorushika
- Released: April 10, 2019
- Studio: Dedé (Tokyo, Japan); ABS Recording (Shibuya, Tokyo, Japan); Bunkamura (Shibuya, Tokyo, Japan); Studio Mech (Meguro, Tokyo, Japan); Ginza (Ginza, Tokyo, Japan); Matsusuta (Tokyo, Japan)
- Genre: J-pop; rock
- Length: 49:16
- Language: Japanese
- Label: U&R records
- Producer: n-buna

Yorushika chronology
A Loser Doesn't Need an Encore (2018)	That's Why I Gave Up on Music (2019)	Elma (2019)

Singles from That's Why I Gave Up on Music
- 1. "Deep Indigo" Released: December 27, 2018; 2. "Parade" Released: March 15, 2019

That's Why I Gave Up on Music (だから僕は音楽を辞めた, Dakara Boku wa Ongaku o Yameta), is the first studio album by Japanese rock duo Yorushika. It was released on April 10, 2019, by U&R records.

== Overview ==
It is a concept album based on the story of "Elma and Amy", written and illustrated by n-buna. The album contains a total of 14 songs by Amy, the protagonist of the story, who wrote them for Elma while travelling to different places in Sweden.

The album cover shows Amy, the character in the title track which explains how he quit music, standing in the crossroad of Tyska Skolgränd and Baggensgatan in Gamla Stan.

== Making ==
N-buna had developed the idea of writing about a man who had quit music as a way of projecting his old self. He set the story in Sweden because of having lived there as a child and the influences it had on him. He went on a trip to Sweden alone and wrote the music there. He also came up with the idea for track 7, "In June, I Write About the Town After the Rain", in a hotel in Gamla Stan as he couldn't go out due to the rain.

== Release ==
In addition to the music, the first press limited edition of the album titled "Letters to Elma" also contains lyrics and letters written by Amy along with pictures of the places he visited.

Prior to the release of the album, music videos for titles "Deep Indigo" on 27 December 2018, "Parade" on 11 March 2019, and "That's Why I Gave Up on Music" on 5 April 2019 were also released.

The duo released their second album titled Elma on 28 August 2019, which serves as a direct sequel to the story of That's Why I Gave Up on Music.

== Track listing ==
All lyrics／music／arrangement by n-buna.

CD／digital download／streaming
No.	Title	Length
1.	"8/31 (Note: Tracks 1, 5, 10, and 13 are instrumental)"	1:54
2.	"Deep Indigo (藍二乗, Ai Nijō)"	4:05
3.	"August, That Place, Moonlight (八月、某、月明かり, Hachigatsu、Bō、Tsukiakari)"	4:36
4.	"Lyric-Writing and Coffee (詩書きとコーヒー, Shikaki to Kohii)"	4:07
5.	"7/13"	1:38
6.	"I'll Dance (踊ろうぜ, Odorō ze)"	4:13
7.	"In June, I Write About the Town After the Rain (六月は雨上がりの街を書く, Rokugatsu wa Ameagari no Machi o Kaku)"	3:58
8.	"In May, from the Emerald-Green Window (五月は花緑青の窓辺から, Gogatsu wa Hanarokushō no Madobe kara)"	3:05
9.	"False Night (夜紛い, Yoru Magai)"	3:43
10.	"5/6"	2:27
11.	"Parade (パレード, Paredo)"	4:59
12.	"Elma (エルマ, Eruma)"	3:39
13.	"4/10"	2:50
14.	"That's Why I Gave Up on Music (だから僕は音楽を辞めた, Dakara Boku wa Ongaku o Yameta) (Note: Sometimes written as "Moonlight" in English)"	4:02
Total length:		49:16

Tower Records exclusive bonus CD
No.	Title	Length
1.	"Deep Indigo (藍二乗, Ai Nijō)" (music box version)	4:05
2.	"False Night (夜紛い, Yoru Magai)" (music box version)	3:43
3.	"That's Why I Gave Up on Music (だから僕は音楽を辞めた, Dakara Boku wa Ongaku o Yameta)" (music box version)	4:02

Village Vanguard exclusive bonus CD
No.	Title	Length
1.	"August, That Place, Moonlight (八月、某、月明かり, Hachigatsu、Bō、Tsukiakari)" (music box version)	4:36
2.	"Parade (パレード, Paredo)" (music box version)	4:59
3.	"Elma (エルマ, Eruma)" (music box version)	3:39

== Personnel ==
Main

- n-buna – lyrics, music, arrangement, piano, other instruments, and producer
- suis – vocals

Supporting

- Mitsuyasu Shimozuru (下鶴 光康, Shimozuru Mitsuyasu) – guitar
- Tatsuya Kitani (キタニ タツヤ, Kitani Tatsuya) – bass
- Masack – drums
- Tetsuya Hirahata (平畑 徹也, Hirahata Tetsuya) – piano, organ, synthesiser

Engineers／Directors／Producers

- Hideyuki Matsuhashi (松橋 秀幸, Matsuhashi Hideyuki) – recording engineer, mixing engineer
- Sayaka Ogoshi (尾越 さやか, Ogoshi Sayaka), Shinya Nomachi (野町 真也, Nomachi Shinya), Yūki Itō (伊藤 裕貴, Itō Yūki), Keita Sasagawa (笹川 景太, Sasagawa Keita) – assistant engineers
- Yasuyuki Kondō (近藤 康行, Kondō Yasuyuki) – recording supervisor (direction and coordination）
- Takehide Ishiyama (石山 武秀, Ishiyama Takehide) – A&R director
- Motosuke Bōda (帽田 基資, Bōda Motosuke) – executive producer

Coordinators

- Mami Ōtake (大竹 まみ, Ōtake Mami) – coordinator
- Yūrika Maeda (前田 侑里香, Maeda Yūrika), Tamiko Tsuchiya (土屋 民子, Tsuchiya Tamiko), Natsuki Sugiho (杉甫 菜月, Sugiho Natsuki), Takushi Karikomi (苅込 琢史, Karikomi Takushi), Takanari Nishiwaki (西脇 隆成, Nishiwaki Takanari) – promotion coordinators（U&R records）

Art

- Popurika (ぽぷりか) – illustrations
- Yoshihide Ōtani (大谷 佳秀, Ōtani Yoshihide), Yūta Sekiguchi (関口 雄太, Sekiguchi Yūta) – art director, design

Studios

- Recording studios – Studio Dedé (Tokyo, Japan), ABS Recording (Shibuya, Tokyo, Japan), Bunkamura Studio (Shibuya, Tokyo, Japan), Studio Mech (Meguro, Tokyo, Japan), Ginza Studio (Ginza, Tokyo, Japan), and Matsusuta Studio (Tokyo, Japan)
- Mixing studio – Matsusuta Studio (Tokyo, Japan)
- Mastered by Yūji Chinone (茅根 裕司, Chinone Yūji) at Sony Music Studios (Tokyo, Japan)

== Charts ==
=== Weekly charts ===
Weekly chart performance for That's Why I Gave Up on Music
Chart (2019)	Peak position
Japanese Albums (Oricon)	5
Japanese Hot Albums (Billboard Japan)	5

=== Year-end charts ===
2019 year-end chart performance for That's Why I Gave Up on Music
Chart (2019)	Position
Japanese Hot Albums (Billboard Japan)	63

2020 year-end chart performance for That's Why I Gave Up on Music
Chart (2020)	Position
Japanese Download Albums (Billboard Japan)	59
