= A Loser Doesn't Need an Encore =

EP (mini-album) by Yorushika
- Released: May 8, 2018
- Studios: Nasoundra Palace (Setagaya, Tokyo, Japan); Studio Dedé (Tokyo, Japan); Anterior (Meguro, Tokyo, Japan); ABS Recording (Shibuya, Tokyo, Japan); Sony Music (Tokyo, Japan)
- Genre: Rock
- Length: 28:42
- Language: Japanese
- Label: U&R records
- Producer: n-buna

Yorushika chronology
The Summer Grass Is Getting in My Way (2017)	A Loser Doesn't Need an Encore (2018)	That's Why I Gave Up on Music (2019)

Alternative cover
- First press limited edition cover

A Loser Doesn't Need an Encore (負け犬にアンコールはいらない, Makeinu ni Ankōru wa Iranai) is the second mini-album by Japanese rock duo Yorushika. It was released on May 9, 2018, by U&R records.

== Track listing ==
All lyrics, music, and arrangement by n-buna.

No.	Title	Length
1.	"Previous Life (前世, Zensei)"	1:19
2.	"A Loser Doesn't Need an Encore (負け犬にアンコールはいらない, Makeinu ni Ankōru wa Iranai)"	3:54
3.	"Compulsive Bomber (爆弾魔, Bakudan Ma)"	3:37
4.	"Hitchcock (ヒッチコック, Hitchikokku)"	3:42
5.	"Falling (落下, Rakka)"	1:14
6.	"Semi-Transparent Boy (準透明少年, Jun Tōmei Shōnen)"	4:41
7.	"Just a Sunny Day for You (ただ君に晴れ, Tada Kimi ni Hare)"	3:18
8.	"Hibernation (冬眠, Tōmin)"	5:01
9.	"Summer, Bus Stop, Waiting for You (夏、バス停、君を待つ, Natsu、Basutei、Kimi wo Matsu)"	1:56
Total length:		28:42

== Personnel ==
Main

- n-buna – lyrics, music, arrangement, piano, other instruments, and producer
- suis – vocals

Supporting

- Mitsuyasu Shimozuru (下鶴 光康, Shimozuru Mitsuyasu) – guitar
- Tatsuya Kitani (キタニ タツヤ, Kitani Tatsuya) – bass
- Masack – drums
- Tetsuya Hirahata (平畑 徹也, Hirahata Tetsuya) – piano

Studios

- Recording studios – Nasoundra Palace Studio (Setagaya, Tokyo, Japan), Studio Dedé (Tokyo, Japan), and Anterior Studio (Meguro, Tokyo, Japan)
- Mixing studio – ABS Recording (Shibuya, Tokyo, Japan)
- Mastering studio – Sony Music Studios (Tokyo, Japan)

== Charts ==
Weekly chart performance for A Loser Doesn't Need an Encore
Chart (2018)	Peak position
Japanese Albums (Oricon)	5
Japanese Hot Albums (Billboard Japan)	6
