= Eat the Wind =

"Kaze wo Hamu"

Single by Yorushika
- Language: Japanese
- English title: Eat the Wind
- Released: October 7, 2020
- Genre: J-pop; rock
- Length: 4:29
- Label: Universal J
- Producer: N-buna

Yorushika singles chronology
"Ghost in a Flower" (2020)	"Kaze wo Hamu" (2020)	"Spring Thief" (2021)

Music video
- "Eat the Wind" on YouTube

"Eat the Wind" (風を食む, Kaze wo Hamu) is a song by the Japanese rock band Yorushika . It was released as a digital-only single by Universal Music Japan on October 7, 2020 through various music distribution services.

== Overview ==
Regarding the theme of the song, Yorushika composer n-buna commented as follows:

In today's society where you can buy anything with just a tap, I wanted to write a song that would comfort those who are tired of consuming.

== Charts ==
Peak chart position for "Eat the Wind"
Chart (2020)	Position
Japan (Japan Hot 100)	49

== In popular culture ==
Ending theme for TBS's "NEWS23," which first aired on September 28, 2020.
