= Sexy Commando Gaiden =

Japanese manga series

- Sexy Commando Gaiden: Sugoi yo!! Masaru-san
- First tankōbon volume cover, featuring Masaru Hananakajima

セクシーコマンドー外伝 すごいよ!!マサルさん (Sekushī Komandō Gaiden: Sugoi yo!! Masaru-san)
- Genre: Absurd comedy; Action
- Manga
- Written by: Kyosuke Usuta
- Published by: Shueisha
- Imprint: Jump Comics
- Magazine: Weekly Shōnen Jump
- Original run: November 1995 – September 1997
- Volumes: 7
- Anime television series
- Directed by: Akitaro Daichi
- Produced by: Satoshi Dezaki
- Music by: Harukichi Yamamoto
- Studio: Magic Bus
- Original network: TBS
- Original run: January 6, 1998 – April 3, 1998
- Episodes: 48 + 2 specials
- icon

Sexy Commando Gaiden: Sugoi yo!! Masaru-san (Japanese: セクシーコマンドー外伝 すごいよ!!マサルさん, Hepburn: Sekushī Komandō Gaiden: Sugoi yo!! Masaru-san; lit. "Sexy Commando Side Story: That's Amazing!! Mr. Masaru") is a Japanese manga series written and illustrated by Kyosuke Usuta. It was serialized in Shueisha's shōnen manga magazine Weekly Shōnen Jump from 1995 to 1997, with its chapters collected in seven tankōbon volumes. An anime television series adaptation, consisting of 48 episodes of seven minutes each, animated by Magic Bus and directed by Akitaro Daichi, was broadcast on TBS's late night programming block Wonderful in 1998.

== Plot ==
Wakame High School's extracurricular Sexy Commando Club consists of 5–6 male members including the principal, a female manager, and a small mysterious pet. The strange art of Sexy Commando (which extends back to Japan's Muromachi period) is a martial one; however, instead of focusing on how to defeat an opponent with physical force, the art focuses on how to distract the opponent to the point he is unable to fight. There are many techniques, though the club tends to favor the unzipping of the trousers technique, known as Erīze no Yūutsu (エリーゼのゆううつ). The club fills up with an eccentric and quirky crowd as it gains popularity.

== Characters ==
Masaru Hananakajima (花中島 マサル, Hananakajima Masaru)
Voiced by: Yūji Ueda
Masaru, a transfer student at Wakame High, dominates all school martial arts clubs before discovering the Sexy Commando guidebook and taking a three-month absence. His immense strength is matched only by his lack of social awareness. When the Karate Club faces disbandment due to member losses, he founds the Sexy Commando Club. He consistently wears blue jeans, a long-sleeved shirt, and two mysterious golden shoulder rings—likely alien technology given their effects (causing rapid hair growth and disrupting electronics) and his violent encounter with beings attempting to reclaim them. Known for his love of mustaches, he marks defeated opponents' foreheads with the kanji for 'meat' (肉 (niku)) (referencing Kinnikuman). As club founder, he creates its anthem, rules, and emblem. Though he once called himself "Shōjo Commando" in childhood, he abandons this title after his father's intervention.
Okometsubu Fujiyama (藤山 起目粒, Fujiyama Okometsubu)
Voiced by: Jun'ichi Kanemaru
Nicknamed "Fūmin" (フーミン), is a very normal transfer student to Wakame High School, and is somewhat of a narrator of the story. He also provides the tsukkomi to Masaru's boke. A bit short and weak looking, he unwittingly becomes Masaru's friend and a club member. He adores cats.
Machahiko Kondō (近藤 真茶彦, Kondō Machahiko)
Voiced by: Kazuya Ichijō
Nicknamed Machahiko (マチャ彦), is the tall, blond former chief of the Karate Club. Once Masaru joins the club and defeats all the club members, all students involved in the club quit and Machahiko must recruit new members before the club is disbanded by the school. Masaru then offers to help, and the club is saved, but the name of the club is then changed to the Sexy Commando Club. Machahiko can be instantly encouraged or discouraged by mentioning that what he does is either "manly" or not.
Tsuyoshi Isobe (磯辺 強, Isobe Tsuyoshi)
Voiced by: Yūichi Nagashima
Nicknamed "Kyasharin" (キャシャリン; "delicate bones"), he has hair dyed brown and is a completely emaciated bag of bones, in part due to his addiction to vitamin supplements. He joins the club in order to become stronger, and for a brief period does become stronger, giving up the vitamins for food and exercise. Unfortunately, his reliance on vitamin supplements continues, and every time he takes them, so does his spasmatic cry "Okure-nisan" (a reference to Japanese comedian Mr. Okure, who is also extremely thin). He was also the ace of his baseball team in middle school.
Kojirō Satō (佐藤 吾次郎, Satō Kojirō)
Voiced by: Ryō Naitō
Nicknamed "Afro-kun" (アフロ君, Afuro-kun), he joins later in the story, and is a semi-minor character. After begging Masaru to make him more "individualistic", Masaru gives this model nerd a perm, and then names him "Afro-kun". An opposing Sexy Commando team member later rips two holes from the afro and his hair assumes a more triangular shape. He is extremely smart, but has no sense with girls.
Nobuyuki Sakakibara (さかきばら のぶゆき, Sakakibara Nobuyuki)
Voiced by: Kazuhiko Inoue
Nicknamed "Susan Fumiko Tanaka" (田中スーザンふ美子, Tanaka Sūzan Fumiko), he is actually a former Sexy Mate (Sexy Commando participant) who won the All-Japan Sexy Commando Tournament six years straight. He was formerly a teacher and now is the principal of the school. He suddenly aged when he expended all of his energy pushing the school 4 inches (100 mm) off its foundation in order to inspire a lazy student (who later became Prime Minister of Japan). He dons a red ski mask when he wishes to become Susan (and hide his identity to Masaru).
Club Manager Tomoe Kitahara (北原 ともえ, Kitahara Tomoe)
Voiced by: Hiroko Konishi
Nicknamed "Moe-moe" (もえもえ), she joined the group initially believing that the club was actually the "Mustache Club". She shares Masaru's love for facial hair, as her father died trying to grow the "legendary blue mustache". She is always supportive of the others in the club. She also spends a considerable amount of time with Meso.
Club Sponsor Tatsurō Matsuda (松田 達郎, Matsuda Tatsurō)
Voiced by: Hiroshi Takahashi
Nicknamed "Torepan" (トレパン), he is an annoying P.E. coach that sponsors the Sexy Commando Club. He always wears training pants (thus the nickname Torepan), wears aviator sunglasses, and is always tweeting away at a coach's whistle. He one time bets the club's endowment money on a baseball game (Sexy Commando Club vs. Baseball Club) that the Sexy Command Club subsequently wins. The club members pay no attention to him, and consider him a nuisance.
Club Mascot Meso (メソ)
Voiced by: Omi Minami
It is questionable what Meso is, because even though the cute, little yellow munchkin with a blue mustache for eyebrows is the mascot of the team, its zipper (located on his back) has opened various times and various other lifeforms have emerged from inside (the anime's finale has Maetel from Galaxy Express 999 come out). Meso's usual comment is "Mokyu" (モキュ). It has been known to be extremely violent when threatened, and has an impressive set of fangs and claws. It was found on either a spaceship or in a coffee shop called Dosukoi Kissa Je T'aime, depending on the club members' opinions.

== Media ==
=== Manga ===
Written and illustrated by Kyosuke Usuta, Sexy Commando Gaiden was serialized in Shueisha's shōnen manga magazine Weekly Shōnen Jump from November 1995 to September 1997. (Note: It was serialized in the magazine from the 52nd issue of 1995 (cover date December 11) to the 40th issue of 1997 (cover date September 15).) Its 79 chapters were collected by Shueisha in seven tankōbon volumes, released from June 4, 1996, to December 4, 1997.

=== Anime ===
An anime television series adaptation, consisting of 48 episodes of seven minutes each, animated by Magic Bus and directed by Akitaro Daichi, was broadcast on TBS's late night programming block Wonderful from January 6 to April 3, 1998. The series' opening theme is "Romance" (ロマンス, Romansu) by Penicillin. Bandai Visual later released the episode on three DVD sets on January 25, 2001.

== Reception ==
Sexy Commando Gaiden is considered a hit in Japan; its seven volumes have sold over 7 million copies. It ranked eighth on a 2016 poll of the "strongest" gag manga to ever appear in Weekly Shōnen Jump, conducted by Goo Ranking website.

Jonathan Bethune in Publishers Weekly said, "Usuta's writing consistently avoids the obvious gags found in typical shonen comedy and instead challenges readers with its clever satire and wit." Commenting on the anime adaptation, Justin Sevakis of Anime News Network called the series Akitaro Daichi's magnum opus in terms of "ridiculous, spastic comedy".
