= Hiroaki Ogi =

Japanese comedian (born 1971)

- 小木 博明
- Born: Hiroaki Kogi; 16 August 1971 (age 54); Tokiwa, Itabashi, Tokyo
- Education: Tokyo Metropolitan Kitano High School
- Employer: Production Jinrikisha
- Spouse(s): Naho Moriyama (m. 2006) "not for 'musical artist'; not shown in 'presenter'"
- Partner: Ken Yahagi
- Relatives: Ryoko Moriyama (mother-in-law); Naotarō Moriyama (brother-in-law); Hiroshi Kamayatsu (relative by marriage)
- Website: Profile by Jinrikisha

Hiroaki Ogi (小木 博明, Ogi Hiroaki; born 16 August 1971) is a Japanese comedian who has regular appearances in a number of television shows as well as portraying roles in television drama series. He was born Hiroaki Kogi (小木 博明, Kogi Hiroaki). Ogi is nicknamed Ogi-kun (小木くん), Sense Ogi (センス小木, Sensu Ogi), and Oggy-bun (オギーブン, Ogībun). Some younger entertainers such as Bananaman and Teruyuki Tsuchida called him Ogi-san (小木さん) regardless of whether they are his senior or junior. He is the boke of OgiYahagi, partnered with Ken Yahagi.

== Appearances ==
=== Regular TV appearances ===
- Music Engine "OgiYahagi Ogi no 37-Sai de gakki Hajimete mimashita!" (Music Air, 2 Oct 2008 –)
- Akuma no Keiyaku ni Sign (29 Oct 2008 – 18 Feb 2009, TBS)
- Tamori Club (TV Asahi) occasional appearances
- AKB48 Nemousu TV Season 4 – (4 Jul 2010 —, Family Gekijo)
- Bratto Shitto (7 Jul – 29 Sep 2011, Kansai TV)
- OgiYahagi Ogi no Natsuhachi-tō! 80's no Aishi-kata (10 Dec 2011 –, Family Gekijo)
- Matsukoi: Ogi no ¥ Dōchū: Moddezzo Yamagata (15 Jul – 30 Sep 2013, Sakuranbo Television)
- Kinina Room (6 Sep 2014 –, Dlife)
- Chotto Zawatsuku Image Chōsa: Moshikashite Zureteru? (23 Jan – 25 Dec 2017, KTV)

=== TV dramas ===
- Densha Otoko (Jul–Sep 2005, Fuji TV) – as clerk at restaurant entrance
- Nagoya Yomeiri Monogatari (Tōkai TV, Fuji TV)
- Unubore Deka Episode 5 "Sweet Tooth" (6 Aug 2010, TBS) – as Yohei Maehara
- Uten Chūshi Nine (12 May – 2 Jun 2015, TV Tokyo) – as Ogi
- Cook Keibu no Bansan-kai Episode 1 (20 (19 at night) Oct 2016, TBS) – as Hisashi Taguchi

=== Films ===
- Pyu to Fuku! Jaguar: The Movie (2008) – as Hammer
- Project Dream: How to Build Mazinger Z's Hangar (2020)
- A Whisker Away (2020) – as Kusugi-sensei

=== Theatre ===
- Jinjō Ningen Zero (28–30 Mar 2008)

=== Others ===
- Minna no Keiba (Fuji TV), when the programme was occasionally doubled, there was a case where a live performance was done on a secondary audio channel.
  - 44th Niigata Kinen (31 Aug 2008)
  - 50th American Jockey Club Cup (25 Jan 2009)
  - 46th Niigata Kinen (29 Aug 2010)
  - 57th Allcomer (23 Sep 2012)
- Honoo-no Taiiku-kai TV (TBS)
- Tetsurō Degawa no Jūden sa sete moraemasen ka? (TV Tokyo)
