= A Whisker Away =

2020 film by Junichi Sato and Tomotaka Shibayama

- Official Japanese release poster

Japanese name
- Kanji: 泣きたい私は猫をかぶる
- Literal meaning: Wanting to Cry, I Pretend to Be a Cat
Transcriptions
- Revised Hepburn: Nakitai Watashi wa Neko o Kaburu
- Directed by: Junichi Sato; Tomotaka Shibayama
- Written by: Mari Okada
- Starring: Mirai Shida; Natsuki Hanae; Minako Kotobuki; Susumu Chiba; Ayako Kawasumi; Sayaka Ohara; Daisuke Namikawa; Hiroaki Ogi; Koichi Yamadera
- Cinematography: Shinya Matsui
- Music by: Mina Kubota
- Production companies: Studio Colorido; Toho Animation; Twin Engine
- Distributed by: Netflix
- Release date: June 18, 2020
- Running time: 104 minutes
- Country: Japan
- Language: Japanese

A Whisker Away (Japanese: 泣きたい私は猫をかぶる, Hepburn: Nakitai Watashi wa Neko o Kaburu; lit. 'Wanting to Cry, I Pretend to Be a Cat') is a 2020 Japanese animated romantic fantasy film produced by Studio Colorido, Toho Animation, and Twin Engine. Directed by Junichi Sato and Tomotaka Shibayama, with the latter being his directorial debut, the film was released on June 18, 2020, on Netflix in Japanese. The film stars Mirai Shida, Natsuki Hanae, Minako Kotobuki, Susumu Chiba, Ayako Kawasumi, Sayaka Ohara, Daisuke Namikawa, Hiroaki Ogi, and Koichi Yamadera.

Originally slated to premiere alongside the Japanese release of the film, the English dub's release was delayed until June 28, 2020, when it was officially released on Netflix.

== Plot ==
Miyo Sasaki is a 14-year-old girl living in the town of Tokoname, Aichi Prefecture. She does not get along with her stepmother, Kaoru. She always flirts with her crush, Kento Hinode, even though he has no romantic feelings for her at all, and often stays away from her. One day, she receives a magical Noh mask from a mysterious mask seller, which lets her become a cat. As "Tarō," she spends time with Hinode, keeps him company while he studies Japanese pottery, and listens to his problems. She longs to confess that the cat he loves and the girl he dislikes are the same person.

One day, Miyo overhears two boys at school insulting Hinode and loudly intervenes by jumping off the school building to defend his honor. She hurts herself during the jump, and for the first time, Hinode shows warmth as he takes her to the nurse and shares his lunch with her. Later that evening, as Tarō, Miyo learns that Hinode's family is closing their pottery shop, as the family can no longer afford it. The need to cheer him up inspires Miyo to confess her love in a letter. In class, a boy snatches the note before she can deliver it and reads it aloud, embarrassing Miyo and Hinode. Hinode saves face by publicly telling Miyo that he hates her and for her to stay far away from him.

A devastated Miyo decides life with Hinode as a cat is better than life without him as a human, and her human face falls off in the form of a porcelain mask. The mask seller obtains her face and tells her he will give it to a cat who wants to become human. Miyo's friends and family begin searching for her, including Hinode, who confesses to Tarō that he does not actually hate her and wants to apologize for breaking her heart. Trapped in her cat body, Miyo begins losing her ability to understand humans and regrets her choice. Kinako, Kaoru's cat, obtains Miyo's human face and takes over her human life. She refuses to return Miyo's face, explaining that she is approaching the end of her natural lifespan but wishes to continue living and bring happiness to her owner.

Miyo follows the mask seller to the secret island of cats to convince him to turn her back into a human. Kinako comes to understand just how much Miyo's stepmom loved her cat and has a change of heart. She reveals the secret of the masks to Hinode and takes him to the island to save Miyo. Kinako gives Hinode a cat mask, which turns him into a half-cat; only his arms turn into those of a cat. Kinako and Hinode are trapped by the mask seller but are rescued by Miyo and another cat who used to be a human.

The mask seller takes Miyo and Hinode to the "promised place" and attempts to finalize their transformations by extracting their lifespan, but is foiled by all of the resentful humans that he had previously turned into cats. As they travel back to the human world, Hinode apologizes to Miyo for berating her and returns her feelings, finally agreeing to become her boyfriend, while Kinako returns Miyo's face, returning her to normal.

The credits show Miyo telling her friend about how Hinode loves her, Hinode telling his mother that he wants to do pottery, and Hinode doing Miyo's signature "Hinode sunrise attack" to her.

== Voice cast ==
Character	Japanese voice	English voice
Miyo Sasaki (笹木 美代, Sasaki Miyo) / Muge (ムゲ) / Tarō (太郎)	Mirai Shida	Cherami Leigh
Kento Hinode (日之出 賢人, Hinode Kento)	Natsuki Hanae	Johnny Yong Bosch
Kusunoki-sensei (楠木先生)	Hiroaki Ogi	Robert Buchholz
Hajime (ハジメ)	Fukushi Ochiai	Robert Buchholz
Mask Seller (猫店主, Neko Tenshu)	Kōichi Yamadera	Keith Silverstein
Kaoru Mizutani (水谷 薫, Mizutani Kaoru)	Ayako Kawasumi	Laura Post
Masamichi Isami (伊佐美 正道, Isami Masamichi)	Kensho Ono	Griffin Burns
Yoriko Fukase (深瀬 頼子, Fukase Yoriko)	Minako Kotobuki	Erika Harlacher
Miki Saitō (斎藤 美紀, Saitō Miki)	Sayaka Ohara	Reba Buhr
Tamaki (タマキ)	Rei Sakuma	Reba Buhr
Yōji Sasaki (笹木 洋治, Sasaki Yōji)	Susumu Chiba	Todd Haberkorn
Sugita (スギタ)	Oolongta Yoshida	Todd Haberkorn
Kenzō Hinode (日之出 賢三, Hinode Kenzō)	Motomu Kiyokawa	Kirk Thornton
Shōta Bannai (坂内 翔太, Bannai Shōta)	Wataru Komada	Bryce Papenbrook
Kakinuma (カキヌマ)	Shin-ichiro Miki	Bryce Papenbrook
Ayumu Niibori (新堀 歩, Niibori Ayumu)	Yūsuke Nagano	Griffin Puatu
Tomoya Sakaguchi (坂口 智也, Sakaguchi Tomoya)	Daisuke Namikawa	Griffin Puatu
Kinako (きなこ)	Eri Kitamura	Cristina Vee
Yūmi Hinode (日之出 優美, Hinode Yūmi)	Rina Kitagawa	Cristina Vee
Shiori Mizoguchi (溝口 詩織, Mizoguchi Shiori)	Rie Hikisaka	Kira Buckland
Sachiko Hinode (日之出 幸子, Hinode Sachiko)	Emi Shinohara	Kira Buckland

== Production ==
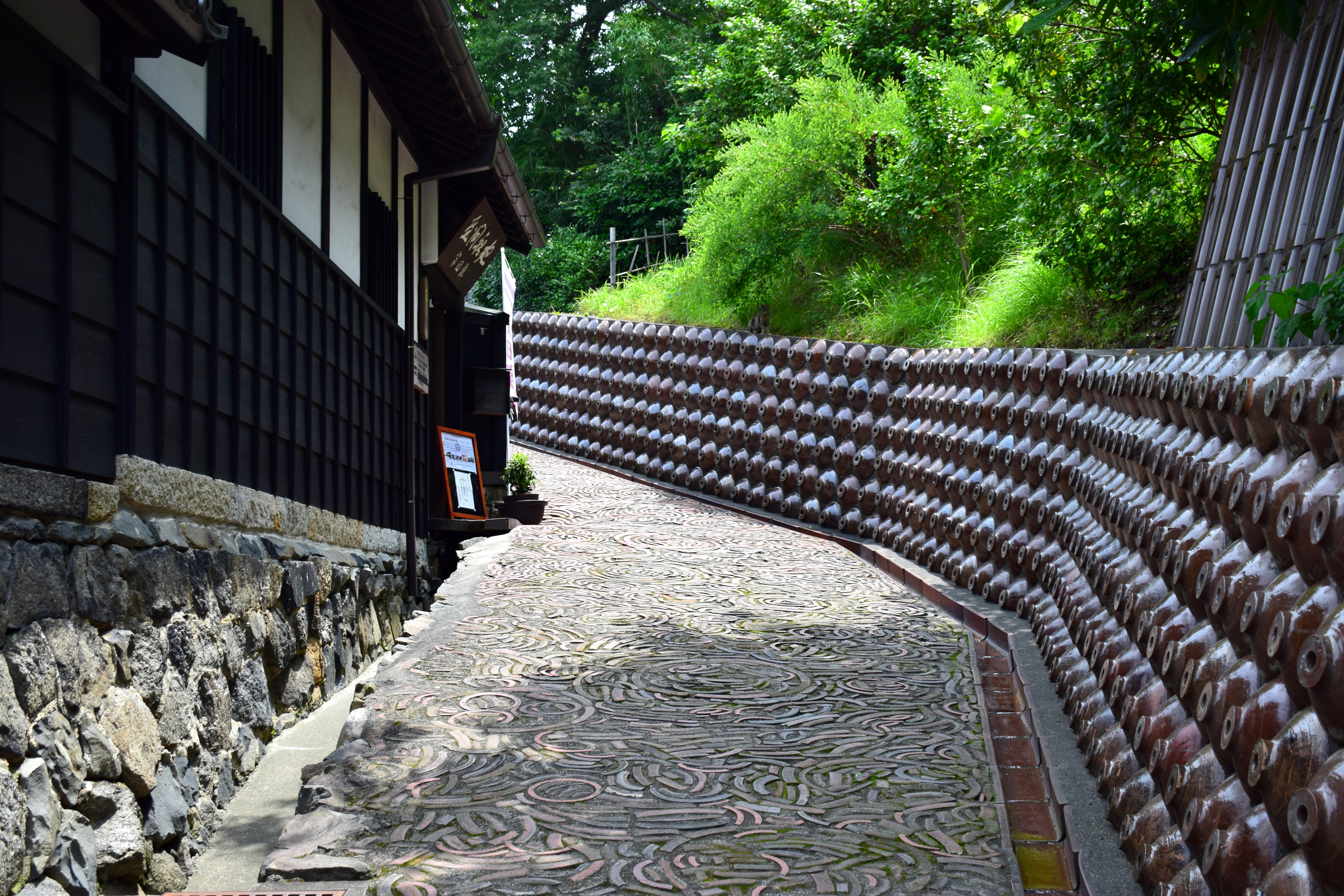
Alley in Tokoname with reinforced pottery walls as seen in the film

The film was animated by Studio Colorido and was based on an original story created by Mari Okada. The film takes place in Tokoname, Japan, since director Tomotaka Shibayama grew up there. Many scenes in the film are directly taken from actual places in the town.

The theme song, "Ghost in a Flower" (花に亡霊, Hana ni Bōrei), the insert song "Night Journey" (夜行, Yakō), and the ending, "Liar" (嘘月, Uso Tsuki; lit. 'Lying Moon'), are all performed by Japanese rock duo Yorushika.

== Manga ==
In May 2020, a manga adaptation was announced. Its first volume was released on June 10, 2020. It ended with chapter 13 on March 12, 2021.

No.	Release date	ISBN
1	June 10, 2020	978-4-04-109619-2
Chapters 1–3
2	December 10, 2020	978-4-04-110809-3
Chapters 4–
3	March 25, 2021	978-4-04-111181-9

== Release ==
The film was originally scheduled for release in Japanese theaters on June 5, 2020, but it was pulled from the schedule due to the COVID-19 pandemic. The film was then sold to Netflix, which released it digitally on June 18, 2020. On September 18, 2020, it was announced the film would have a limited theatrical run in Japan throughout October 2020. In Japan, the film was released on Blu-ray and DVD on June 23, 2021.

== Reception ==
On the review aggregation website Rotten Tomatoes, the film holds an approval rating of 93% based on 14 reviews, with an average rating of 7.7/10. Lawrence Bennie of UK Film Review awarded it four out of five stars, calling it "sweet, cute, and charming" and "a great piece of anime escapism." Jamie Morris of LeftLion also awarded it a positive review, saying it will "give plenty of people a reason to smile."

== Awards ==
- Asian Academy Creative Awards "Best Animation Work Award" (in Japanese)
- The 24th Japanese Media Arts Festival Animation Division "Excellent Work Award" (in Japanese)
