= N-buna =

Japanese music producer and composer

n-buna
- Origin: Gifu Prefecture, Japan
- Genres: J-pop; rock; pop; pop rock
- Instruments: Vocals; guitar; keyboards; mandolin
- Years active: 2012–present
- Label: U&R records
- Website: d-ue.jp/n-buna/

N-buna (pronounced nabuna, stylized as n-buna) is a Japanese music producer and composer. He is a Vocaloid music producer and is the guitarist and songwriter for the Japanese rock duo Yorushika.

== History ==
N-buna was born in Gifu Prefecture in Japan. His family members all played music instruments, so he bought an electric guitar when he was in 8th grade. He started writing music, but did not publish his works until he came across vocaloid songs and realized that he can post his works on the internet.

In 2012, N-buna started composing as vocaloid music producer, and posted "Alice Trust " (アリストラスト, Arisutorasuto) on Niconico. After that, his 2013 song "Tōmei Elegy" (透明エレジー, Toumei Elegy) reached first on the platform's daily vocaloid ranking.

On April 26, 2014, he released his first solo album, Kātenkōruga Yamumaeni (カーテンコールが止む前に). Then, On July 22, 2015, he released Hanato Mizuame, Saishūdensha (花と水飴、最終電車) with U&R Records, marking his first album with a major record label. On July 6, 2016, Tsukio Aruiteru (月を歩いている) was released.

Together with vocaloid producer Orangestar, n-buna wrote the song "Star Night Snow" for SNOW MIKU 2017.

Though n-buna believes that vocaloid has its strengths as the singing is uniquely emotionless, he also wants to compose songs better expressed by a human. Vocalist suis has sung for n-buna's first live in 2016, and n-buna thinks suis's husky voice fits the types of music he wants to make. Thus, in April 2017, n-buna and suis formed the rock band Yorushika.

Most of n-buna's activities are henceforth under Yorushika. However, he still uses the name n-buna in various occasions. In 2019, he published a digital single "Silence" featuring vocalist Sarah Furukawa. NHK invited him to narrate a 2021 documentary on a transgender man living in Sendai, which came as a surprise for n-buna since he was mainly involved in music production. However, he accepted this request.

== Discography ==
Title	Details	Peak chart position
Curtain Call ga Yamu Mae ni (カーテンコールが止む前に, Kātenkōru ga Yamu Mae ni)	Released April 26, 2014; Label: Dwango User Entertainment, Inc.	–
Hana to Mizuame, Saishū Densha (花と水飴、最終電車)	Released July 22, 2015; Label: U&R records	24
Walking on the Moon (月を歩いている, Tsuki o Aruite iru)	Released July 6, 2016; Label: U&R records	20
Sunflower (向日葵, Himawari)	Acoustic single, released July 3, 2025 on his personal YouTube channel; Self-sung; written for his now wife.	–

N-buna has also released additional albums under the name of the rock duo Yorushika of which he is a member.
