= Seventeen (Yoasobi song) =

2023 single by Yoasobi

Single by Yoasobi

from the EP Hajimete no – EP and The Book 3
- Language: Japanese
- Released: March 27, 2023
- Genre: J-pop
- Length: 3:19
- Label: Sony Japan
- Songwriter: Ayase
- Producer: Ayase

Yoasobi singles chronology
"Adventure" (2023)	"Seventeen" (2023)	"Idol" (2023)

Music video
- "Seventeen" on YouTube; English version on YouTube

"Seventeen" (Japanese: セブンティーン, Hepburn: Sebuntīn) is a song by Japanese duo Yoasobi from their EPs, Hajimete no – EP and The Book 3 (2023). It was released through Sony Music Entertainment Japan on March 27, 2023, as the fourth and final single from the short story collection project Hajimete no, following "Mr.", "Suki da", and "Umi no Manimani". It was based on 120th Naoki Prize-winning Miyuki Miyabe's story Iro Chigai no Trump.

== Background and release ==
On December 1, 2021, the same day as their extended play The Book 2 release, Yoasobi announced the project Hajimete no, a collaboration between the duo and four Naoki Prize-winning novelists, comprising Rio Shimamoto, Mizuki Tsujimura, Miyuki Miyabe, and Eto Mori, to produce songs based on the authors' stories with theme of "a story to read when you do [something] for the first time". All novels were published as a book on February 16, 2022, titled Hajimete no. One of four novels written by Miyabe is Iro Chigai no Trump (色違いのトランプ, Iro Chigai no Toranpu; lit. "Color-different playing cards") with the theme "a story when you first become a suspect". "Seventeen" expresses a 17-year-old girl who bids farewell to the world she lived in and her parents to save the crisis in the parallel world.

In January 2023, Lawson's Machi Café partnered with Yoasobi for customers to offer a special drink called "Yoasobi Honey Caffè Latte"; they would also receive a sleeve with two-dimensional code for listening to the snippet of the duo's then-unreleased song from Hajimete no project, "Seventeen". Two months later, on March 22, Yoasobi announced that the song would be available for download and streaming platforms on March 27. An accompanying music video premiered on the same date as the release, produced by Contrail Co., Ltd and MAPPA, and directed by Masatsugu Nagasoe. The song was included on the duo's EPs Hajimete no – EP and The Book 3, released on May 10 and October 4, 2023, respectively. The English version appeared on their third English-language EP E-Side 3, released on April 12, 2024.

== Commercial performance ==
"Seventeen" debuted at number 32 on the Oricon Combined Singles Chart, and atop the Digital Singles Chart for the issue dated April 10, 2023, with 12,645 downloads, becoming Yoasobi's eleventh number-one since "Shukufuku" (2022). For Billboard Japan, "Seventeen" entered the Japan Hot 100 at number 21 dated April 5, earning 10,737 downloads, peaked at number two on the Download Songs. The song also debuted at number 63 on the Streaming Songs, and ascended to number 36 the following week with 2,847,845 streams, an increase of 130%. "Seventeen" was certified platinum for 100 million streams by Recording Industry Association of Japan (RIAJ).

== Other uses ==
"Seventeen" featured on the trailer "Forge Your Path" for Brownies' Towa and the Guardians of the Sacred Tree.

== Credits and personnel ==
- Ayase – songwriter, producer
- Ikura – vocals
- Hikaru Yamamoto – bass
- Takeruru – guitar
- Miyuki Miyabe – based story writer
- Takayuki Saitō – vocal recording
- Masahiko Fukui – mixing
- Hidekazu Sakai – mastering

== Charts ==
=== Weekly charts ===
Weekly chart performance for "Seventeen"
Chart (2023)	Peak position
Japan Combined Singles (Oricon)	32
Japan Hot 100 (Billboard)	21

=== Year-end charts ===
Year-end chart performance for "Seventeen"
Chart (2023)	Position
Japan Download Songs (Billboard Japan)	67

== Certifications ==
Certifications for "Seventeen"
Region	Certification	Certified units/sales
Streaming
Japan (RIAJ)	Platinum	100,000,000^{†}
^{†} Streaming-only figures based on certification alone.

== Release history ==
Release dates and formats for "Seventeen"
Region	Date	Format	Label	Ref.
Various	March 27, 2023	Digital download; streaming	Sony Japan	
