= Umi no Manimani =

2022 single by Yoasobi

Single by Yoasobi

from the EP Hajimete no – EP and The Book 3
- Language: Japanese
- English title: "Manimani"
- Released: November 18, 2022
- Genre: J-pop
- Length: 4:15
- Label: Sony Japan
- Songwriter: Ayase
- Producer: Ayase

Yoasobi singles chronology
| "Shukufuku" (2022) | "Umi no Manimani" (2022) | "Adventure" (2023) |

Music video
- "Umi no Manimani" on YouTube "Manimani" on YouTube

"Umi no Manimani" (Japanese: 海のまにまに; lit. "at the mercy of the sea") is a song by Japanese duo Yoasobi, taken from their EPs, Hajimete no – EP and The Book 3 (2023). It was released as a single on November 18, 2022, through Sony Music Entertainment Japan, as the third song from the short story collection project Hajimete no after "Mr.", and "Suki da". The song was based on the story Yūrei, written by 147th Naoki Prize-winning Mizuki Tsujimura.

== Background and release ==
On December 1, 2021, the same date as their EP The Book 2 release, Yoasobi announced the project Hajimete no, a collaboration between the duo and four Naoki Prize-winning novelists: Rio Shimamoto, Mizuki Tsujimura, Miyuki Miyabe, and Eto Mori, to produce songs based on the authors' novel under the theme of "a story to read when you do [something] for the first time". All novels were published as a book on February 16, 2022, titled Hajimete no. One of four novels written by Tsujimura is Yūrei (ユーレイ; lit. "Ghost") with the theme "a story when you first run away from home". It is about a middle school "I" who runs away from home and arrives at a seaside town. She meets a mysterious girl who holds bouquets of flowers at the beach at night.

On November 6, 2022, Yoasobi began posting a series of Stories via their pop-up store Tabi Suru Honya-san Yoasobi Gō's Instagram account, teasing a snippet of "Umi no Manimani", based on Yūrei. Followed by numerous texts from the based novel, the last story announced that the song would be released on November 18. To commemorate the release, billboards of 400-character handwritten reading impressions of Yūrei were placed inside the Tokyo Metro subways and at Shibuya Station between November 7 and 13. Japanese voice actor Shin'ichirō Kamio, actress Tao Tsuchiya, YouTuber Bunkei, singer Momoko Gumi Company (Bish), comedian Nishida (Lalande), and sociologist Noritoshi Furuichi are in charge of writing the impressions. All billboards were later featured in the single's teaser video, uploaded on November 15. A music video for "Umi no Manimani", directed by Asuka Dokai, premiered on March 21, 2023.

"Umi no Manimani" was later included on Yoasobi's EPs Hajimete no – EP and The Book 3, released on May 10 and October 4, 2023, respectively. The English version, "Manimani", appeared on their third English-language EP E-Side 3, released on April 12, 2024.

== Composition ==
"Umi no Manimani" is a medium-tempo track written by member Ayase, expressing "the mood change of the protagonist who runs away from home to the mysterious world of the beach at night, which is the main worldview of the story." The song was composed in the key of D major, 98 beats per minute with a running time of four minutes and 15 seconds.

== Other uses ==
"Umi no Manimani", its visual, and its based story were adapted into an exhibition called Immersive Museum Yoasobi – "Umi no Manimani" ga, Dekiru Made at Bellesalle Shinjuku South Exit from July 10 to September 8, 2024.

== Credits and personnel ==
- Ayase – songwriter, producer
- Ikura – vocals
- Mizuki Tsujimura – based story writer
- Takayuki Saitō – vocal recording
- Masahiko Fukui – mixing
- Hidekazu Sakai – mastering

== Charts ==
Chart performance for "Umi no Manimani"
| Chart (2022) | Peak position |
|---|---|
| Japan Digital Singles (Oricon) | 7 |
| Japan Hot 100 (Billboard) | 68 |

== Release history ==
Release dates and formats for "Umi no Manimani"
| Region | Date | Format | Label | Ref. |
|---|---|---|---|---|
| Various | November 18, 2022 | Digital download; streaming | Sony Japan | |
