= Killa (Yoasobi song) =

Single by Yoasobi
- Language: Japanese; English
- Released: November 11, 2026
- Length: 3:04
- Label: Echoes; Sony Japan
- Songwriter: Ayase
- Producers: Tsumiki; Ayase

Yoasobi singles chronology
"Sakihokore" (2026)	"Killa" (2026)

"Killa" is song by Japanese duo Yoasobi. It was released on November 11, 2026, through Echoes and Sony Music Entertainment Japan. Written by Ayase and co-arranged by Tsumiki, the song was based on Yoa Mabyō's novel Senpai o Koroshitai no de Josō Suru (2026).

== Background and release ==
Following the publication of the short story collection Hajimete no (2022), Yoasobi collaborated with Rio Shimamoto, Mizuki Tsujimura, Miyuki Miyabe, Eto Mori, Suirinsha, and Monogatary.com to launch a project called Hajimete no Bungei-bu in September 2022 to discover and nurture new novelists. Announced in July 2023, four novels were selected from a total of 634 entries. One of the winners is Yoa Mabyō's Senpai o Koroshitai no de Josō Suru (センパイを殺したいので女装する; lit. 'I want to kill my senior, so I am cross-dressing'). Suirinsha published the novel on October 16, 2026.

Three years after the project's announcement, on September 30, 2026, Yoasobi hosted the radio program All Night Nippon Gold as special DJs. During the show, the duo played the demo version of the then-unreleased track "Killa", based on Mabyō's novel, and revealed that the song had finished recording, while the final process was ongoing and Vocaloid producer Tsumiki co-arranged the song alongside Ayase. The duo described it as a return to the "novel into music" root. The short version was teased on TikTok on November 1, alongside a promotional campaign that lets users post a video featuring the song. Yoasobi released "Killa" through digital music and streaming platforms on November 11.

== Production and composition ==
Set at a high school on the outskirts of Kyoto, Senpai o Koroshitai no de Josō Suru follows a second-year male student who falls in love with the beautiful, eccentric literary club senior Mitsuko Sonomura, a lesbian. He cross-dresses to grant Sonomura's wish by being killed by an "ideal beautiful girl" on the day she graduates, due to being forced to marry into a local yakuza family to settle her family's debts. Writing for Real Sound, Tomoyuki Mori described "Killa" containing "dark, edgy beats and a moody, shadowy soundscape, all brought together by vocals that balance between madness and beauty." The song's verse features poetry reading-styled vocals with lyrics aiming to inspire listeners to read the original work. Ayase arranged "40%" of the song before sending to Tsumiki to complete it.

== Live performances ==
Yoasobi included "Killa" on the setlist for their Super Planet Tour. They performed for the first time on October 25, 2026, at Kyocera Dome Osaka. The performance was uploaded on YouTube on November 11, the song's release date.

== Credits and personnel ==
- Ayase – songwriter, arrangement, producer, instruments
- Ikura – vocals
- Tsumiki – arrangement
- Yoa Mabyō – based story writer

== Charts ==
Chart performance for "Killa"
Chart (2026)	Peak position
Japan Combined Singles (Oricon)	96
Japan Hot 100 (Billboard)	41

== Release history ==
Release dates and formats for "Killa"
Region	Date	Format	Label	Ref.
Various	November 11, 2026	Digital download; streaming	Echoes; Sony Japan	
