= The Book 3 =

EP by Yoasobi
- Released: October 4, 2023
- Genres: J-pop; electropop; synth-pop
- Length: 29:31
- Language: Japanese
- Label: Sony Japan
- Producer: Ayase

Yoasobi chronology
| Hajimete no – EP (2023) | The Book 3 (2023) | E-Side 3 (2024) |

Singles from The Book 3
- 1. "Mr." Released: February 16, 2022; 2. "Suki da" Released: May 30, 2022; 3. "Shukufuku" Released: October 1, 2022; 4. "Umi no Manimani" Released: November 18, 2022; 5. "Adventure" Released: February 15, 2023; 6. "Seventeen" Released: March 27, 2023; 7. "Idol" Released: April 12, 2023; 8. "Yūsha" Released: September 29, 2023

The Book 3 is the third Japanese-language EP (sixth overall) by Japanese duo Yoasobi. It was released on October 4, 2023, through Sony Music Entertainment Japan, one year and ten months after their second EP The Book 2 (2021). Continuing with the "reading CD" concept as previous records, the EP spans electropop and synth-pop genres, comprising ten tracks, which were solely written and produced by one half of the duo Ayase.

Eight singles preceded The Book 3, including top-five anime opening theme songs: Mobile Suit Gundam: The Witch from Mercury's "Shukufuku", Oshi no Ko's "Idol", and Frieren: Beyond Journey's End's "Yūsha". Commercially, The Book 3 peaked at number two on both the Oricon Albums Chart and Billboard Japan Hot Albums, and was certified gold by the Recording Industry Association of Japan (RIAJ) for shipments of over 100,000 units. The EP won Finalist Award (Red) at the 16th CD Shop Awards.

== Background and release ==
Yoasobi released their first two extended plays in 2021—The Book and The Book 2—with the concept of a "reading CD" with a binder package. The EPs peaked at number two on the Oricon Albums Chart, In 2021, the duo collaborated with Naoki Prize-winning four novelists Rio Shimamoto, Mizuki Tsujimura, Miyuki Miyabe, and Eto Mori for the short story collection Hajimete no, published in March 2022. It inspired four songs "Mr.", "Suki da", "Umi no Manimani", and "Seventeen", which were included on a companion EP. Apart from the project, the duo released the theme song for Universal Studios Japan's 2023 Unibaru campaign "Adventure", and two anime series opening themes: "Shukufuku" for Mobile Suit Gundam: The Witch from Mercury and "Idol" for Oshi no Ko, which the latter became the duo's most successful song to date in both Japan and overseas.

On September 1, 2023, Yoasobi announced their third extended play, titled The Book 3, along with its track list and album cover, scheduled for release on October 4. Pre-orders for the EP began on the same day, available only as a limited-edition binder package. The Book 3 consists of all singles from 2022 to then-recent September 2023, including all songs from Hajimete no – EP; and three new tracks, which two are interludes "Awakening" and "Worship", intros for "Shukufuku" and "Idol", respectively, and another is an opening theme for anime series Frieren: Beyond Journey's End, titled "Yūsha", which was announced the same day as the EP via a promotional video of the anime. The song was released as a single ahead of the EP on September 29. The Book 3's trailer was uploaded on October 1. A year later, in 2024, the vinyl record format was released elsewhere by Sony Music Germany and Black Screen Records on July 26, and in Japan with the different cover artwork illustrated by Qingyi on October 23.

== Music and lyrics ==
The Book 3 is an electropop and synth-pop record, and contains ten tracks. The opening track "Yūsha" incorporated the Frieren titular character's emotional changes and memories towards the hero Himmel. Despite funky and upbeat music, it expresses the lonely and melancholy atmosphere of the anime. "Shukufuku" narrates perspective from Mobile Suit Gundam: The Witch from Mercury's character XVX-016 Gundam Aerial to its host Suletta Mercury to fight alongside her and watch her lead-up to the events of the anime. "Umi no Manimani" talks about a girl who runs away from home and gets off at a train station by the sea at night, and she is called out to by a mysterious girl. Described as a "painfully ephemeral" city pop, "Mr." is about the desire of an android towards their owner.

A combination of idol-styled pop, hip-hop, rock, and video game music, "Idol" depicts the two-faced nature of idols in the entertainment industry via various perspectives on Oshi no Ko's character Ai Hoshino from her fans, her groupmates, and herself. It is followed by "Seventeen", which depicts a 17-year-old girl who decides to bid farewell to the world she lives in and her parents to save the crisis in the parallel world. "Adventure" is described as "a bright and refreshing spring-like song packed with fun memories at the [Universal Studios Japan] park." The Book 3 concluded with "Suki da", telling the protagonist's fourth attempt to confess her childhood friend, while struggling across space and time to erase her past love confessions.

== Promotion ==
After The Book 3 announcement, on September 14, 2023, Yoasobi appeared at the television special NHK Music Expo 2023, where they discussed their favorite music with South Korean acts Seventeen's Woozi and NewJeans, and broadcast the performance of "Idol" filmed at the 2023 Summer Sonic Festival. The duo performed "Idol" on television for the first time at South Korean music show M Countdown on September 21. They also gave interviews and appeared on magazine covers for NME, Rockin'On Japan, Separate Volume Kadokawa, Rolling Stone Japan with Bring Me the Horizon's Oliver Sykes, Anan, and only interview for With. Similar to their previous EPs, the duo commemorated the release with the telephone campaign Denwa o "Yoru ni Kakeru" Shisaku for commentaries of each track from The Book 3 from September 27 to October 4; on the last day, fans were able to call the duo directly.

To promoted The Book 3, Yoasobi appeared on several television shows during the promotion: Mezamashi TV, Nichiyōbi no Hatsumimi-gaku, Ano-chan no Den Den Denpa, Ogen-san no Sabusuku-dō, and The Weekly 99 Music. They performed "Adventure" on television for the first time at CDTV Live! Live! on December 18, and gave the televised performance of "Idol" at the 74th NHK Kōhaku Uta Gassen on December 31, featuring selected members of Japanese and Korean idol groups from Seventeen, Nogizaka46, NiziU, Be:First, NewJeans, JO1, Stray Kids, Sakurazaka46, Le Sserafim, and MiSaMo, (Note: List of selected idol performers: Seventeen: Hoshi, DK, Mingyu, and Seungkwan; Nogizaka46: Minami Umezawa, Renka Iwamoto, Mizuki Yamashita, Haruka Kaki, Mayu Tamura, and Nao Yumiki; NiziU: Mako, Riku, Ayaka, Mayuka, and Miihi; Be:First: Sota, Leo, Junon, and Manato; NewJeans: Minji, Hanni, and Danielle; JO1: Shosei Ohira, Syoya Kimata, Sukai Kinjo, Junki Kono, and Ruki Shiroiwa; Stray Kids: Felix, Seungmin, and I.N; Sakurazaka46: Yui Kobayashi, Rina Matsuda, Yui Takemoto, Hikaru Morita, and Rena Moriya; Le Sserafim: Sakura, Kim Chaewon, Huh Yunjin, and Kazuha; MiSaMo: Momo, Sana, and Mina) singer Ano; actress and the show's host Kanna Hashimoto; Real Akiba Boyz; and dance group Avantgardey. In support of the EP, Yoasobi embarked on their first Asia Tour from December 2023 to January 2024, including appearances at Clockenflap in Hong Kong and Simple Life Festival in Taiwan, and continued with the Pop Out Zepp Tour in Japan between January and March 2024.

== Critical reception ==
Professional ratings
Review scores
| Source | Rating |
|---|---|
| Financial Times | 3/5 stars |

Mie Sugiura from Rockin'On Japan praised The Book 3 as a "wonderful EP" with an "ultimate level of perfection", and a "collection of short stories expressed through magnificent yet delicate music." Writing for Real Sound, Z11 called the EP "a collection of high-quality short stories". Financial Times's critic Ludovic Hunter-Tilney rated the EP three out of five stars. He described that "as if they have emerged from manic coding sessions, at once hectic and precisely put together," highlighting the earwormy aspect.

Critics' rankings of The Book 3
| Critic/Publication | Accolade | Rank | Ref. |
|---|---|---|---|
| Teen Vogue | 15 Best Non-English Albums of 2023 | —N/a | |

== Commercial performance ==
In Japan, The Book 3 debuted at number two on the Oricon Albums Chart, selling 71,556 copies, behind only Mr. Children's Miss You. It also topped the Digital Albums Chart, Yoasobi's fourth album to do so, gaining 11,021 downloads in its first week, for four non-consecutive weeks. Overall, the EP landed at number two on the Combined Albums Chart. The Book 3 entered the Billboard Japan Hot Albums at number two, blocked from Miss You. In its first week, the EP earned 72,927 physical copies (number two on the Top Albums Sales), and 9,094 downloads (number one on the Download Albums); the latter was the second biggest digital sales week in 2023, behind 15,190 units of Kessoku Band's self-titled album, and topped for three consecutive week. In November, The Book 3 received gold certification for physical format from the Recording Industry Association of Japan (RIAJ), exceeding 100,000 shipments.

== Accolades ==
Awards and nominations for The Book 3
| Ceremony | Year | Category | Result | Ref. |
|---|---|---|---|---|
| CD Shop Awards | 2024 | Grand Prix (Red) | Nominated | |
| CD Shop Awards | 2024 | Finalist Award | Won | |

== Track listing ==
All tracks are written by Ayase.

The Book 3 track listing
| No. | Title | Length |
|---|---|---|
| 1. | "Yūsha" (勇者) | 3:14 |
| 2. | "Interlude 'Awakening'" | 0:48 |
| 3. | "Shukufuku" (祝福) | 3:12 |
| 4. | "Umi no Manimani" (海のまにまに) | 4:16 |
| 5. | "Mr." (ミスター) | 3:05 |
| 6. | "Interlude 'Worship'" | 1:07 |
| 7. | "Idol" (アイドル) | 3:31 |
| 8. | "Seventeen" (セブンティーン) | 3:18 |
| 9. | "Adventure" (アドベンチャー) | 3:18 |
| 10. | "Suki da" (好きだ) | 3:37 |
| Total length: | | 29:31 |

== Credits and personnel ==
- Ayase – songwriter, producer
- Ikura – vocals (1, 3–5, 7–10)
- Ebony Bowens – background chorus (1, 7)
- Lyle Carr – background chorus (7)
- Shore Cienna – background chorus (1)
- Imani J. Dawson – background chorus (1, 7)
- Emily – background chorus (1)
- Mimiko Goldstein – background chorus (1)
- Ivy – background chorus (1)
- Chloe Kibble – background chorus (7)
- Kyte – background chorus (7)
- Haley Lewis – background chorus (1)
- Marrista – background chorus (1)
- Zaquro Misohagi – background chorus (5)
- Sofia Ray – background chorus (1)
- Andrew Soda – background chorus (7)
- Marista Stubbs – background chorus (7)
- Missy Suzuki – background chorus (1)
- Velvet – background chorus (1)
- Jonas Gen Whitaker – background chorus (1)
- Real Akiba Boyz – background shouts (7)
- Konnie Aoki – background chorus lyrics (1, 7)
- AssH – guitar (6, 9–10)
- Takeruru – guitar (2–3, 5, 8)
- Hikaru Yamamoto – bass (2–3, 8)
- Jirō Kiso – based story writer (1)
- Ichirō Ōkouchi – based story writer (3)
- Mizuki Tsujimura – based story writer (4)
- Rio Shimamoto – based story writer (5)
- Aka Akasaka – based story writer (7)
- Miyuki Miyabe – based story writer (8)
- Nagi – based story writer (9)
- Eto Mori – based story writer (10)
- Takayuki Saitō – vocal recording
- Kunio Nishikawara – background chorus recording (1)
- Yūki Iwata – background chorus recording (1)
- Hiroaki Okuda – background chorus recording (7), background shouts recording (7)
- Masahiko Fukui – mixing
- Hidekazu Sakai – mastering

== Charts ==
=== Weekly charts ===
Weekly chart performance for The Book 3
| Chart (2023) | Peak position |
|---|---|
| Japanese Albums (Oricon) | 2 |
| Japanese Combined Albums (Oricon) | 2 |
| Japanese Hot Albums (Billboard Japan) | 2 |

=== Monthly charts ===
Monthly chart performance for The Book 3
| Chart (2023) | Position |
|---|---|
| Japanese Albums (Oricon) | 4 |

=== Year-end charts ===
2023 year-end chart performance for The Book 3
| Chart (2023) | Position |
|---|---|
| Japanese Albums (Oricon) | 42 |
| Japanese Digital Albums (Oricon) | 2 |
| Japanese Hot Albums (Billboard Japan) | 30 |

2024 year-end chart performance for The Book 3
| Chart (2024) | Position |
|---|---|
| Japanese Digital Albums (Oricon) | 7 |
| Japanese Hot Albums (Billboard Japan) | 55 |

2025 year-end chart performance for The Book 3
| Chart (2025) | Position |
|---|---|
| Japanese Hot Albums (Billboard Japan) | 50 |

== Certifications and sales ==
Certifications and sales figures for The Book 3
| Region | Certification | Certified units/sales |
|---|---|---|
| Japan (RIAJ) Physical | Gold | 152,712 |
| Japan Digital | — | 52,126 |

== Release history ==
Release dates and formats for The Book 3
| Region | Date | Format | Label | Ref. |
|---|---|---|---|---|
| Various | October 4, 2023 | Digital download; streaming | Sony Japan | |
| Japan | October 4, 2023 | CD | Sony Japan | |
| Taiwan | October 20, 2023 | CD | Sony Taiwan | |
| Various | July 26, 2024 | Vinyl | Sony Germany; Black Screen | |
| Japan | October 23, 2024 | Vinyl | Echoes; Sony Japan | |
| Various | December 2025 | Vinyl | Sony Germany; Black Screen | |
