= Sakihokore =

Single by Yoasobi
- Language: Japanese
- English title: "The Bloom"
- Released: October 14, 2026
- Genre: Dance-pop
- Length: 4:06
- Label: Echoes; Sony Japan
- Songwriter: Ayase
- Producer: Ayase

Yoasobi singles chronology
"Orion" (2026)	"Sakihokore" (2026)	"Killa" (2026)

Music video
- "Sakihokore" on YouTube

"Sakihokore" (Japanese: 咲き誇れ; lit. 'to be in bloom proundly') is a song by Japanese duo Yoasobi. It was released by Echoes and Sony Music Entertainment Japan on October 14, 2026. Based on Risa Wataya's Hana no Inochi wa Fumetsu nari, the song serves as the theme song for NHK's 115th morning television drama series, Blossom (2026). Commercially, "Sakihokore" peaked at number 35 on the Oricon Combined Singles Chart and number 12 on the Billboard Japan Hot 100.

== Background and release ==
On May 29, 2025, NHK held the press conference in Osaka to announce the 115th morning television drama series (asadora), titled Blossom. It will star Shizuka Ishibashi as Tama Hano, loosely based on the life of author Chiyo Uno. The series is set to premiere in the second half of 2026. On July 23, 2026, it was revealed that duo Yoasobi would perform a theme song for the series.

On September 8, the series held a preview screening of the first week's episodes, "Watashi no Chichi, Watashi no Haha", where the theme song's title, "Sakihokore" and its snippet were revealed through the title sequence that features Ishibashi as Hano dancing under blooming cherry blossom trees. The song publicly premiered on September 28, alongside the series' first episode, and its full-length version was officially released via digital music and streaming platforms on October 14.

== Production and composition ==
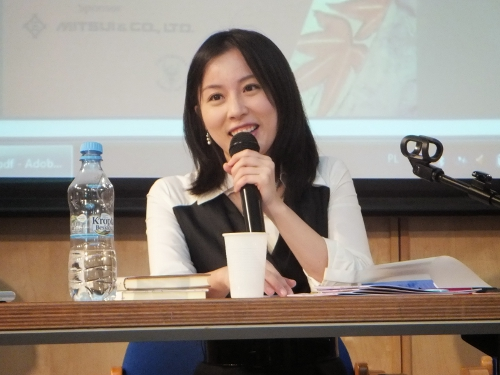
Risa Wataya (pictured) wrote a based story for "Sakihokore".

Risa Wataya wrote the original story for "Sakihokore", titled Hana no Inochi wa Fumetsu nari (桜(はな)の命は不滅なり; lit. 'The life of cherry blossom flower is immortal') about Uno's inexhaustible vitality, likening it to a cherry blossom tree, that changes the protagonist's thought following meeting her. It was published via Yoasobi's official website on September 28, 2026. For writing process, Ayase additionally read Uno's memoir I Will Go On Living (1983) and used the series' script as a reference, and travelled to her hometown in Iwakuni, Yamaguchi Prefecture, the same home prefecture as him, which hugely influenced him to write the song in one go, about one day. In an interview with NHK, he revealed that he was struggling mentally during the song's production.

"Sakihokore" is described as a dance-pop track with "bright, cheerful melody and positive lyrics." The song's fanfare-like intro incorporates a brass-band sound, and the vocals express a blend of "open-heartedness, earnest resilience, and a resolute strength of will." Lyrically, it depicts the protagonist forging their own path through turbulent eras. It features vocals, handclapping, and stomps by current and former members of the cover group Plusonica, as well as an orchestra performed by Yuta Bandoh-led Ensemble FOVE and arranged by Yuya Haryu.

== Music video ==
An accompanying animated music video for "Sakihokore" premiered on October 14, 2026. It was directed by Nina Ai and Nobuhide Kariya. Inspired by Uno's life and Hana no Inochi wa Fumetsu nari, the music video depicts a girl picking up a book written by Uno and encountering it, amidst the everyday routine, resulting in she finding herself wavering, yet ultimately moves forward on her own. The scenes alternate to Uno at different times and in different circumstances. It featured "a life that changes through encounters and partings, and how [Uno] embraces joy and sadness even through the twists and turns and moves forward strongly" with cherry blossoms in full bloom.

== Promotion and live performances ==
Yoasobi gave an interview on NHK Yamaguchi's radio show Yamagutic on October 9, 2026, and news program Information Revolution! Yamaguchi on October 16. The duo and Ishibashi appeared on the NHK General TV special Renzoku Terebi Shōsetsu "Blossom" Shudaika ga Dekiru made on November 3 to discuss the production of "Sakihokore". On October 17, 2026, Ikura performed "Sakihokore" at the street performance in Soseigawa Park, Sapporo, as part of Spotted: content series. The song was included on the setlist for Yoasobi's Super Planet Tour, debuted at Kyocera Dome Osaka.

== Credits and personnel ==
- Ayase – songwriter, producer, instruments
- Ikura – vocals
- Risa Wataya – based story writer
- Plusonica (Note: Consisting of Amu, Yūichirō Ogawa, Kantarō, Kuu, Saya, Kayoi Tsubaki, Ryūga Tsubaki, Hikaru Naruke, Haldona, Masa, Mikl, and Ryoem.) – chorus, handclapping, stomps
- Sota Morimitsu – bass
- Nao Tohara – violin
- Karito Ohmitsu – violin
- Ami Oike – violin
- Mayuko Ishigami – violin
- Yurina Arai – violin
- Motonari Sakuma – violin
- Tadashi Machida – violin
- Shiori Takeda – violin
- Seira Horiuchi – violin
- Momoko Takeda – violin
- Sumika Tsuji – violin
- Chihiro Tai – viola
- Nanako Tsuji – viola
- Sion Nakamura – viola
- Kei Yamazawa – cello
- Yū Itō – cello
- Anri Tsukiji – cello
- Jun'ichirō Taku – flute, piccolo
- Sae Higashi – clarinet
- Ken'ichi Tsujimoto – trumpet
- Tomoki Andō – trumpet
- Kaname Hamaji – horn
- Arin Shirai – horn
- Takase Shintarō – trombone
- Koichi Nonoshita – bass trombone
- Kazumasa Ōya – percussion
- Yuya Haryu – orchestra additional arrangement
- Yuta Bandoh – recording direction

== Charts ==
Chart performance for "Sakihokore"
Chart (2026)	Peak position
Japan Combined Singles (Oricon)	35
Japan Hot 100 (Billboard)	12

== Release history ==
Release dates and formats for "Sakihokore"
Region	Date	Format	Label	Ref.
Various	October 14, 2026	Digital download; streaming	Echoes; Sony Japan	
