= Suki da (song) =

2022 single by Yoasobi

Single by Yoasobi

from the EP Hajimete no – EP and The Book 3
- Language: Japanese
- English title: "Loving You"
- Released: May 30, 2022
- Genre: J-pop
- Length: 3:37
- Label: Sony Japan
- Songwriter: Ayase
- Producer: Ayase

Yoasobi singles chronology
"Mr." (2022)	"Suki da" (2022)	"Shukufuku" (2022)

Music video
- "Suki da" on YouTube "Loving You" on YouTube

"Suki da" (Japanese: 好きだ; lit. "I Like You") is a song by Japanese duo Yoasobi from their EPs Hajimete no – EP and The Book 3 (2023). It was released on May 30, 2022, through Sony Music Entertainment Japan, as the second single from the short story collection project Hajimete no following "Mr." Based on the short story Hikari no Tane written by 135th Naoki Prize-winning Eto Mori, the song depicts a high school girl's fourth confession to her crush and efforts to erase her past confessions through time travel. "Suki da" peaked at number 23 on the Oricon Combined Singles Chart and number eight on the Billboard Japan Hot 100. The accompanying music video, directed by Kazuaki Seki, was uploaded on November 13.

== Background and release ==
On December 1, 2021, the same date as their EP The Book 2 release, Yoasobi announced the project Hajimete no, a collaboration between the duo and four Naoki Prize-winning novelists: Rio Shimamoto, Mizuki Tsujimura, Miyuki Miyabe, and Eto Mori, to produce songs based on the authors' short stories under the theme of "a story to read when you first did". All four novels were published as a book, titled Hajimete no, on February 16, 2022. One of four novels with the theme "a story when you first confess" by Mori, Hikari no Tane (ヒカリノタネ; lit. "Seeds of Light"), depicts the story of Yuma, a high school girl who has been in love with her childhood friend Shiita for over ten years. She tries to erase her past confessions by journeying through time and space to confirm her fourth confession for him.

On May 22, shortly after the music video of "Mr." premiered, Yoasobi uploaded the promotional video to announce the second song from Hajimete no series based on Mori's novel, titled "Suki da". It shows Ikura's voice reading Hikari no Tane with texts from the story and several photos of Hajimete no book covers. The song was available on digital music and streaming platforms on May 30. Before the release, it was teased at all 7-Eleven branches in Japan from May 23, alongside the duo's comments about it. The cover artwork by Moe Yoshino shows a collage of colorful imaginary flowers. The song was later included on Yoasobi's EPs Hajimete no – EP, released on May 10, 2023, and later The Book 3 October 4. The English version, titled "Loving You", appeared on their third English-language EP E-Side 3, released on April 12, 2024.

== Composition ==
"Suki da" is described as a mid-tempo "sensational" love pop song, expressing the protagonist's fourth attempt to confess her crush, who is her childhood friend, while struggling across space and time to erase her past love confessions. Mori said that the song depicts the protagonist's misunderstanding, awareness, and determination and reflects "thinking about someone from the bottom of [her] heart". The song was written by Ayase, a member who handles a production of the duo, composed in the key of E minor at 120 beats per minute with a running time of three minutes and thirty-seven seconds. The keys of the three choruses are all different, reflecting the ups and downs of emotions.

== Commercial performance ==
"Suki da" debuted at number 23 on the Oricon Combined Singles Chart. Additionally, the song landed at number one on the Oricon Digital Singles (Single Track) Chart, selling 14,639 downloads in its first week. It became the ninth number-one song on the Digital Singles Chart and marked Yoasobi as the second most number-one artist on the chart, behind only Kenshi Yonezu, who has 10 songs. "Suki da" entered the Billboard Japan Hot 100 at number eight, earned 12,558 downloads and charted at number three on the Download Chart; with 2,623,457 streams, it peaked at number 39 on the Streaming Chart on its first week.

== Music video ==
An accompanying music video for "Suki da" was initially scheduled for premiere on November 6, 2022, but was postponed to November 13 due to production reasons. The music video was directed by Kazuaki Seki, portraying the plot of Hikari no Tane's illustration. The music video for the song's English version was uploaded on November 8, 2024.

== Live performances and usage in media ==
Yoasobi performed "Suki da" live for the first time at the Rock in Japan Festival on August 6, 2022, and the Rising Sun Rock Festival on the 12th. On September 7, "Suki da" was chosen to accompany an advertisement for the hair care product Ichikami starring Mei Nagano and Yoshiaki Higashi. On the same day, Yoasobi also released the debut performance of the song from the 2022 Rock in Japan Festival to commemorate the collaboration.

== Credits and personnel ==
- Ayase – songwriter, producer
- Ikura – vocals
- AssH – acoustic guitar
- Eto Mori – based story writer
- Takayuki Saitō – vocal recording
- Masahiko Fukui – mixing
- Hidekazu Sakai – mastering
- Moe Yoshino – cover artwork design

== Charts ==
Chart performance for "Suki da"
Chart (2022)	Peak position
Japan Combined Singles (Oricon)	23
Japan Hot 100 (Billboard)	8

== Certifications ==
Certifications for "Suki da"
Region	Certification	Certified units/sales
Streaming
Japan (RIAJ)	Gold	50,000,000^{†}
^{†} Streaming-only figures based on certification alone.

== Release history ==
Release dates and formats for "Suki da"
Region	Date	Format	Label	Ref.
Various	May 30, 2022	Digital download; streaming	Sony Japan	
