= Mr. (song) =

2022 single by Yoasobi

Single by Yoasobi

from the EP Hajimete no – EP and The Book 3
- Language: Japanese
- Released: February 16, 2022
- Genre: City pop
- Length: 3:07
- Label: Sony Japan
- Songwriter: Ayase
- Producer: Ayase

Yoasobi singles chronology
"Tsubame" (2021)	"Mr." (2022)	"Suki da" (2022)

Music video
- "Mr." on YouTube; English version on YouTube

"Mr." (Japanese: ミスター, Hepburn: Misutā) is a song by Japanese duo Yoasobi from their EPs, Hajimete no – EP and The Book 3 (2023). It was released on February 16, 2022, through Sony Music Entertainment Japan, as the first single from the short story collection project Hajimete no. Written by Ayase and based on 159th Naoki Prize-winning Rio Shimamoto's short story Watashi Dake no Shoyūsha, the song is about the desire of an android for their owner. Commercially, "Mr." reached number 11 on the Billboard Japan Hot 100, and number 19 on the Oricon Combined Singles Chart.

== Background and release ==
On December 1, 2021, the same day as the EP The Book 2 release, Yoasobi announced a collaboration with four Naoki Prize-winning novelists: Rio Shimamoto, Mizuki Tsujimura, Miyuki Miyabe, and Eto Mori; for writing and singing songs based on the novelists' short stories under the theme of "a story to read when you first did". All four novels were published as a book, titled Hajimete no, on February 16, 2022. With the theme "a story when you first fell in love", Shimamoto's story Watashi Dake no Shoyūsha (私だけの所有者; lit. "My only owner") is about a "first feeling" of android Boku towards their owner Mr. Naruse.

On January 26, during their radio show Yoasobi's All Night Nippon X, the duo revealed the title of the song "Mr.", based on Shimamoto's story. They made a poll on Twitter for fans to guess the single's release date between February 16, 18, or 21. On February 8, Yoasobi revealed the snippet at Fuji TV's morning show Mezamashi TV and announced that the single would be released on February 16 to digital music and streaming platforms, alongside the teaser video. The full song was aired for the first time at the radio show hosted by the duo on the same day. The single's cover artwork was designed by Tomoko Kikuchi. The song was later included on Yoasobi's EPs Hajimete no – EP and The Book 3, released on May 10 and October 4, 2023, respectively. The English version, "Mister", appeared on their third English-language EP E-Side 3, released on April 12, 2024.

== Composition ==
"Mr." is described as a "painfully ephemeral" city pop song about the desire of an android for their owner, written by Ayase, a member of Yoasobi. The duo's band member Zaquro Misohagi participates in the song's chorus. It was composed in the key of C♯ minor, 120 beats per minute with a running time of three minutes and seven seconds. Shimamoto commented the song "gently evoked memories of people I could not meet anymore."

== Commercial performance ==
"Mr." entered the Oricon Combined Singles Chart at number 19 and the Digital Singles (Single Track) Chart at number two with 18,914 downloads in its first week. For Billboard Japan, the song debuted at number 11 on the Japan Hot 100. It sold 16,227 download units in its first week, charting at number two on the Download Songs, behind only Aimer's "Zankyōsanka". The song also debuted at number 46 on the Streaming Songs, and peaked at number 33. Globally, "Mr." reached number 143 on the Billboard Global Excl. U.S.

== Music video ==
An accompanying music video for "Mr." was premiered on May 22, 2022, at 8:00 PM (JST), preceded by the teaser video on May 9. Produced by Ijigen Tokyo, who previously handled Yoasobi's "Halzion" music video, the music video depicts the android Boku reminiscing a memory with their owner Mr. Naruse before the owner is severely injured and dies in a large-scale catastrophe. The music video for the song's English version was uploaded on November 8, 2024.

== Live performances ==
Yoasobi gave the debut performances of "Mr." at 2022 Rock in Japan Festival on August 6, 2022, and Rising Sun Rock Festival on the 12th.

== Credits and personnel ==
- Ayase – songwriter, producer
- Ikura – vocals
- Zaquro Misohagi – chorus
- Takakeru – guitar
- Rio Shimamoto – based story writer
- Takayuki Saitō – vocal recording
- Masahiko Fukui – mixing
- Hidekazu Sakai – mastering

== Charts ==
=== Weekly charts ===
Weekly chart performance for "Mr."
Chart (2022)	Peak position
Global Excl. US (Billboard)	143
Japan Combined Singles (Oricon)	19
Japan Hot 100 (Billboard)	11

=== Year-end charts ===
2022 year-end chart performance for "Mr."
Chart (2022)	Position
Japan Download Songs (Billboard Japan)	83

== Certifications ==
Certifications for "Mr."
Region	Certification	Certified units/sales
Streaming
Japan (RIAJ)	Gold	50,000,000^{†}
^{†} Streaming-only figures based on certification alone.

== Release history ==
Release dates and formats for "Mr."
Region	Date	Format	Label	Ref.
Various	February 16, 2022	Digital download; streaming	Sony Japan	
