= Adventure (Yoasobi song) =

2023 single by Yoasobi

Single by Yoasobi

from the EP The Book 3
- Language: Japanese
- Released: February 15, 2023
- Genre: J-pop
- Length: 3:19
- Label: Sony Japan
- Songwriter: Ayase
- Producer: Ayase

Yoasobi singles chronology
"Umi no Manimani" (2022)	"Adventure" (2023)	"Seventeen" (2023)

Music video
- "Adventure" on YouTube; English version on YouTube

"Adventure" (Japanese: アドベンチャー, Hepburn: Adobenchā) is a song by Japanese duo Yoasobi from their third EP, The Book 3 (2023). It was released as a single on February 15, 2023, through Sony Music Entertainment Japan. Written by Ayase, the song is a theme for 2023 Universal Studios Japan's campaign Unibaru, based on Nagi's short story Lens Goshi no Kirameki o. Its accompanying music video, showing an animated girl dancing in the theme park, premiered on March 11. Commercially, "Adventure" peaked at number 48 on the Oricon Combined Singles Chart and number 30 on the Billboard Japan Hot 100.

== Background and release ==
On October 19, 2022, Yoasobi announced a collaboration with Universal Studios Japan to write and sing a theme for the student support campaign called Unibaru in 2023, based on the novel that won the contest held by the campaign, under the theme "unforgettable memories in school age at the [USJ] park". Lens Goshi no Kirameki o (レンズ越しの煌めきを; lit. "the sparkles beyond the lenses"), written by Nagi, won the contest. The theme park released the 2023 advertisement for Unibaru on January 26, 2023, featuring Yoasobi's new song titled "Adventure". Since February 1, the song was played at Hollywood Dream – The Ride venue in the theme park.

The full-length version of the song was aired for the first time on the radio show Rock Kids 802 on February 9. Three days later, Yoasobi revealed the cover artwork and the teaser video for "Adventure", announcing to be available for digital music and streaming platforms on February 15. Created by Kouhei Kadowaki, the cover artwork features an illustration of confetti in front of Universal Studios Japan's gate. The teaser video shows Ikura's voice reading passages from the based stories in front of the blurred background of the theme park. Later, "Adventure" was included on the duo's third EP The Book 3, which was released on October 4. The English version was released on February 16, 2024, a day after the first anniversary, and included on their third English-language EP E-Side 3.

== Composition ==
"Adventure" is described as "a bright and refreshing spring-like song packed with fun memories at the [USJ] park." Musically, "Adventure" contains acoustic guitar intro and "colorful" synth, depicting the main character stepping into a special place and freeing their mind and body.

== Music video ==
A scene in the music video shows an animated girl dancing in the real square in Universal Studios Japan.

An accompanying music video for "Adventure", directed by Jun Tamukai, premiered on March 11, 2023, at 10:00 AM JST. It shows a fusion of live-action and animation, depicting "somewhere between fantasy and reality." The story of the music video is creative director Rei Hanada's idea after her first listening to the song, and imagining a scene of "a girl walking around Universal Studios Japan and dancing with her heart pumping." The music video for the English version was uploaded on February 23, 2024.

The video begins with animation of a girl walking and starting to dance in the "low degree of freedom" background with "limited-color flat horizontal scrolling like a retro game." When the girl runs through the gate, the background is changed to inside Universal Studios Japan at night and she continuously dances, including at the square and the restaurant. The video ended up with the girl returning to reality and meeting her friends who "could not meet easily due to the COVID-19 pandemic" in front of the theme park.

== Live performances ==
Universal Studios Japan held a special concert, called Unibaru! Live 2023, at Universal Studios Japan, Osaka, for four days on March 11–12 and 25–26; the lineup included Yoasobi, Sakurazaka46, Little Glee Monster, and NiziU. The duo performed on the first day and gave the debut performance of "Adventure" as the last song of the setlist, featuring Snoopy, Hello Kitty, and Sesame Street's mascots. The performances of the song and "Yoru ni Kakeru", broadcast via Premium Music on March 22. "Adventure" was included on the setlist of the duo's first concert tour Denkōsekka Arena Tour. Yoasobi performed on television for the first time at CDTV Live! Live! Christmas SP on December 18, filmed at Universal Studios Japan.

== Other uses ==
"Adventure" is used as an image song for Japanese dub of 2024 live-action animated adventure comedy film Paddington in Peru, to premiere in Japan on May 9, 2025.

== Track listing ==
- Digital download and streaming
1. "Adventure" (アドベンチャー) – 3:19
- Digital download and streaming – English version
1. "Adventure" (English version) – 3:20

== Credits and personnel ==
- Ayase – songwriter, producer
- Ikura – vocals
- Konnie Aoki – lyrics (English version)
- Marrista – background chorus (English version)
- Imani J. Dawson – background chorus (English version)
- BFNK – background chorus (English version)
- Nana Hatori – background chorus (English version)
- Mayowa Sensei – background chorus (English version)
- AssH – guitar
- Nagi – based story writer
- Takayuki Saitō – vocal recording
- Masahiko Fukui – mixing
- Hidekazu Sakai – mastering

== Charts ==
=== Weekly charts ===
Weekly chart performance for "Adventure"
Chart (2023)	Peak position
Japan Combined Singles (Oricon)	48
Japan Hot 100 (Billboard)	30

=== Year-end charts ===
Year-end chart performance for "Adventure"
Chart (2023)	Position
Japan Download Songs (Billboard Japan)	48

== Certifications ==
Certifications for "Adventure"
Region	Certification	Certified units/sales
Streaming
Japan (RIAJ)	Platinum	100,000,000^{†}
^{†} Streaming-only figures based on certification alone.

== Release history ==
Release dates and formats for "Adventure"
Region	Date	Format	Version	Label	Ref.
Various	February 15, 2023	Digital download; streaming	Original	Sony Japan	
Various	February 16, 2024	Digital download; streaming	English	Sony Japan	
