= E-Side 3 =

EP by Yoasobi
- Released: April 12, 2024
- Genre: J-pop
- Length: 27:31
- Language: English
- Label: Sony Japan
- Producer: Ayase

Yoasobi chronology
The Book 3 (2023)	E-Side 3 (2024)	E-Side 4 (2026)

Singles from E-Side 3
- 1. "Idol" Released: May 26, 2023; 2. "Biri-Biri" Released: November 18, 2023; 3. "The Brave" Released: November 24, 2023; 4. "Adventure" Released: February 16, 2024

E-Side 3 is the third English-language EP (seventh overall) by Japanese duo Yoasobi. It was surprise-released on April 12, 2024, through Sony Music Entertainment Japan. The EP consists of eight tracks from the duo's songs recorded in the English language, including four preceding singles: "Idol", "The Brave", "Biri-Biri", and "Adventure".

== Background and release ==
Yoasobi released their first two English-language extended plays E-Side and E-Side 2, which consists of the duo's Japanese songs re-recorded in English. the both EPs reached top ten on the Billboard Japan Hot Albums. From May 2023 to February 2024, the duo released four English-language singles: "Idol", an opening theme for the anime series Oshi no Ko (2023); "Biri-Biri", a collaboration for the first anniversary of role-playing video games Pokémon Scarlet and Violet; "The Brave" ("Yūsha"), the first opening theme for the anime series Frieren: Beyond Journey's End (2023–2024); and "Adventure", a theme for 2023 Universal Studios Japan's campaign Unibaru.

In early 2024, Yoasobi announced that they would perform at two US music festivals–Coachella in April and Lollapalooza in August, as well as the two-show Yoasobi Live in the USA in April in Los Angeles and San Francisco. On April 11, the duo announced their third English-language EP, titled E-Side 3, to be available on digital music and streaming platforms the next day, alongside its cover artwork, track listing, and a snippet video called "crossfade movie". The duo gave interviews and appeared on the covers for magazines Spur and Paper.

== Track listing ==
All tracks are written by Ayase and translated to English by Konnie Aoki.

E-Side 3 track listing
No.	Title	Length
1.	"Biri-Biri"	3:06
2.	"Idol"	3:32
3.	"Mister"	3:04
4.	"Manimani"	4:16
5.	"The Brave"	3:15
6.	"Seventeen"	3:19
7.	"Loving You"	3:37
8.	"Adventure"	3:19
Total length:		27:31

Notes

- All tracks are noted as "English version".

== Charts ==
=== Weekly charts ===
Weekly chart performance for E-Side 3
Chart (2024)	Peak position
Japanese Digital Albums (Oricon)	3
Japanese Hot Albums (Billboard Japan)	16

=== Year-end charts ===
Year-end chart performance for E-Side 3
Chart (2024)	Position
Japanese Download Albums (Billboard Japan)	59

== Release history ==
Release dates and formats for E-Side 3
Region	Date	Format	Label	Ref.
Various	April 12, 2024	Digital download; streaming	Sony Japan	
