= Blossom (Japanese TV series) =

- Genre: Drama
- Written by: Tsuyoshi Sakurai; Yoshiko Komatsu
- Directed by: Makoto Bonkobara and others
- Starring: Shizuka Ishibashi; Mariko Kaga; Daichi Kaneko; Takako Matsu; Ryōko Kuninaka; Atsuro Watabe
- Narrated by: Masayuki Sanjo
- Opening theme: "Sakihokore" by Yoasobi
- Composer: Fox Capture Plan
- Country of origin: Japan
- Original language: Japanese

Production
- Producer: Yohei Ohno
- Running time: 15 minutes
- Production company: NHK

Original release
- Network: NHK General TV
- Release: September 28, 2026 – present

Blossom (ブラッサム, Burassamu) is a Japanese television drama series and the 115th Asadora series. The protagonist is based on the novelist Chiyo Uno, but the work is a work of fiction, and her name has also been changed.

== Plot ==
In 1897, Tama Hano was born in Iwakuni, Yamaguchi Prefecture. She lost her biological mother at the age of two and was raised by her father and stepmother. She eventually embarked on a career as a novelist, but her life was marked by numerous hardships, including the Great Kantō Earthquake, the Pacific War, the bankruptcy of a company she had founded, and the debts that followed. Despite these hardships, she continued to write and eventually established herself as a successful novelist.

== Cast ==
=== Principal ===
- Shizuka Ishibashi as Tama Hano
  - Ran Murakami as young Tama
  - Mariko Kaga as old Tama

=== Her family ===
- Atsuro Watabe as Kiyoji Hano, Tama's father
- Ryōko Kuninaka as Ryo Hano, Tama's mother
- Masaki Miura as Kiyoshige Hano, Tama's uncle
- Wataru Hyuga as Mamoru Hano, Tama's brother
- Aoi Ito as Toshiko Hano, Tama's sister
- Taiyu Fujiwara as Hideo Hano, Tama's brother

=== Iwakuni ===
- Honoka Matsumoto as Ume Iwata
- Norito Yashima as Kozo Iwata
- Kaoru Kusumi as Katsu Iwata
- Mai Kiryu as Shinobu Kakuta
- Yuki Hana as Ineko Morioka
- Chisato Nakai as Tae Hashimoto
- Asuka Kudo as Tatsuhiko Shimamura
- Maho Yamada as Teruko Kimura
- Daichi Kaneko as Tamotsu Kimura

=== Tokyo ===
- Tsukasa Saito as Kumada
- Saori Seto as Matsuko
- Ai as Sugi
- Maokoto as Yone
- Yūko Nakamura as Maki Miyoshi
- Masaaki Akahori as Tatsugoro Miyoshi
- Junya Kawashima as Honda
- Hideki Kitano as Ryota Hidari

=== Hokkaido ===
- Kaoru Sugita as Namie Kimura
- Hiroki Miyake as Shogo Kimura

=== Authors and their families ===
- Machiko Ono as Fuko Dobashi, modeled after Nobuko Yoshiya
- Shota Sometani as Ichiro Nishio, modeled after Shiro Ozaki
- Kengo Kora as Kakunosuke Akiyama, modeled after Ryūnosuke Akutagawa
- Himi Sato as Kiichiro Kajiya, modeled after Motojirō Kajii
- Ryo Nishikido as, Ginji Natsui, modeled after Seiji Tōgō
- Mitsuki Tanimura as Sanae Natsui, Ginji's wife
- Sakura Fujiwara as Sumiko
- Kaishi Iwao as Futaro Tajima
- Issey Ogata as Ushimaru Koyama
- Mayu Hotta as Sayoko Mori, modeled after Fumiko Hayashi
- Kou Maehara as Yasunari Kawagishi, modeled after Yasunari Kawabata
- Sara as Shizuyo Kawagishi, Yasunari's wife
- Marika Itō as Kinuko Hagimiya
- Daichi Watanabe as Tokio Kamiyama, modeled after Takeo Kitahara
- Hana Maeda as Saki Kamiyama
- Mariko Tsutsui as Yoshiko Kamiyama
- Yoshi Sakou as Tokitaro Kamiyama

=== Literary magazine Shuto Koron ===
- Kenichi Endō as Daizaburo Kurosaki
- Arata Iura as Yuzo Yamanaka
- Hitoe Ohkubo as Yokota

=== Others ===
- Takako Matsu as Yuko Fujikawa, Tama's assistant.
- Moeka Hoshi as Momoyo Monden

== Production ==
On May 29, 2025, NHK held a press conference to announce the production of Blossom, the 115th installment of the Asadora series, and announced that Shizuka Ishibashi would play the heroine. Chief producer Shunpei Murayama also revealed that Ishibashi had been offered the role directly rather than selected through an audition. He explained that the decision was based on the fact that, when considering the life of Chiyo Uno, the model for the protagonist, her thirties and forties were particularly important periods.

== TV schedule ==
Week	Episodes	Title	Directed by	Original airdate	Rating
1	1–5	"Watashi no Chichi, Watashi no Haha" (私の父、私の母)	Makoto Bonkobara	September 28–October 2, 2026	14.6%
2	6–10	"Chichi kara no, Kaiho" (父からの、解放)	Makoto Bonkobara	October 5–9, 2026	13.8%
3	11–15	"Kesho to, Hatsukoi" (化粧と、初恋)	Makoto Bonkobara	October 12–16, 2026	13.9%
4	16–20	"Iwakuni to, Tomo ni" (岩国と、共に)	Yusuke Noda	October 19–23, 2026	14.2%
5	21–25	"Kyoso de, Tokyo" (狂騒で、東京)	Satoru Nakaizumi	October 26–30, 2026	14.3%
6	26–30	"Futari, Kita e" (ふたり、北へ)	Satoru Nakaizumi	November 2–6, 2026	14.0%
7	31–35	"Abaku, Kaku" (あばく、書く)	Satoru Nakaizumi	November 9–13, 2026	13.8%
8	36–40	"Zatsuon ni, Au" (雑音に、会う)	Yoji Tanaka	November 16–20, 2026	
9	41–45	"Shojiki to, Chichi" (正直と、父)		November 23–27, 2026	

Preceded by The Scent of the Wind	Asadora; September 28, 2026–	Succeeded by Mawaru Swan
