= Dive!! =

Manga

- Cover of the first novel published by Kodansha
- Genre: Comedy, sports
- Novel series
- Written by: Eto Mori
- Published by: Kodansha; Kadokawa Shoten
- Original run: April 20, 2000 – August 8, 2002
- Volumes: 4
- Manga
- Written by: Eto Mori; Masahiro Ikeno
- Published by: Shogakukan
- Imprint: Shōnen Sunday Comics
- Magazine: Weekly Shōnen Sunday
- Original run: June 13, 2007 – June 4, 2008
- Volumes: 5
- Live-action film
- Directed by: Naoto Kumazawa
- Studio: Kadokawa Pictures
- Released: June 14, 2008
- Runtime: 115 minutes
- Manga
- Written by: Eto Mori
- Illustrated by: Ruzuru Akashiba
- Published by: Kadokawa Shoten
- English publisher: NA: Yen Press
- Magazine: Young Ace
- Original run: June 2, 2017 – September 4, 2018
- Volumes: 3
- Anime television series
- Directed by: Kaoru Suzuki
- Written by: Touko Machida
- Music by: Yuki Hayashi; Kohta Yamamoto
- Studio: Zero-G
- Licensed by: Sentai Filmworks
- Original network: Fuji TV (Noitamina)
- Original run: July 6, 2017 – September 21, 2017
- Episodes: 12

Dive! (stylized as DIVE!!) is a Japanese novel series written by Eto Mori and published in four volumes by Kodansha between August 2000 and August 2002. A manga adaptation, in collaboration with Masahiro Ikeno, was serialized in Shogakukan's Weekly Shōnen Sunday between June 2007 and June 2008. A live-action film premiered in June 2008. Another manga adaptation, in collaboration with Ruzuru Akashiba, was serialized in Kadokawa Shoten's Young Ace between June 2017 and August 2018. An anime television series by Zero-G aired on Fuji TV's Noitamina programming block from July to September 2017.

== Plot ==
The story centers on the Mizuki Diving Club (MDC) member Tomoki Sakai. The MDC has fallen on hard times, and their sponsors are preparing to pull their support. They promise to give the club another year of support if the new coach, Kayoko Asaki, can get one of the members into the Olympics in a year's time.

== Characters ==
=== Main characters ===
Tomoki Sakai (坂井知季, Sakai Tomoinku)
Voiced by: Yuki Kaji
Portrayed by: Kento Hayashi
A middle schooler in the MDC who's been diving for six years. He has a natural flexibility and an excellent dynamic vision. He was a mediocre diver at first, but quickly improved under the guidance of Kayoko.
Yōichi Fujitani (富士谷要一, Fujitani Youichi)
Voiced by: Takahiro Sakurai
Portrayed by: Sosuke Ikematsu / Takumi Kitamura
A diving thoroughbred with two former divers as parents. He's a high school student who's been diving ever since his second-year in elementary school. He was the middle school champion for three years in a row.
Shibuki Okitsu (沖津飛沫, Okitsu Shibuki)
Voiced by: Yuichi Nakamura
Portrayed by: Junpei Mizobata

=== MDC Members ===
Reiji Maruyama (丸山レイジ, Maruyama Reiji)
Voiced by: Kōki Uchiyama
Ryō Ōhiro (大広陵, Ouhiro Ryou)
Voiced by: Ryōta Ōsaka
Sachiya Yoshida (吉田幸也, Yoshida Sachiya)
Voiced by: Yūsuke Kobayashi

=== MDC Coaches ===
Kayoko Asaki (麻木夏陽子, Asaki Kayoko)
Voiced by: Kaori Nazuka
Keisuke Fujitani (富士谷敬介, Fujitani Keisuke)
Voiced by: Katsuyuki Konishi
Chikara Ōshima (大島 力, Ooshima Chikara)
Voiced by: Wataru Hatano

=== Rivals ===
Kenichirō Teramoto (寺本健一郎, Teramoto Kenichirou)
Kiyotaka Matsuno (松野清孝, Matsuno Kiyotaka)
Voiced by: Kenshō Ono
Atsuhiko Yamada (山田篤彦, Yamada Atsuhiko)
Voiced by: Tomokazu Sugita
Toshihiko Tsuji (辻利彦, Tsuji Toshihiko)
Voiced by: Shouta Aoi
Jirō Hirayama (平山二郎, Hirayama Jirou)
Voiced by: Kengo Kawanishi

=== Tomoki's Acquaintances ===
Hiroya Sakai (坂井弘也, Sakai Hiroya)
Voiced by: Ryōhei Kimura
Miu Nomura (野村未羽, Nomura Miu)
Voiced by: Rina Hidaka

== Media ==
=== Novels ===
Dive!! is a series of novels written by Eto Mori. Four tankōbon were published by Kadokawa between April 20, 2000, and August 8, 2002. Kodansha released the series in two bunkobon on May 26, 2006. A combined version of the two bunkobon was also released on June 18, 2016, as an e-book.

=== Manga ===
A manga adaptation, in collaboration with Masahiro Ikeno, ran in Shogakukan's Weekly Shōnen Sunday between June 13, 2007, and June 4, 2008. (Note: The 2008–27th issue of Weekly Shōnen Sunday (cover date June 18) was published on June 4, 2008.) Shogakukan collected its chapters in five tankōbon volumes, released from October 18, 2007, to July 18, 2008.

Another manga adaptation, illustrated by Ruzuru Akashiba, was serialized in Kadokawa Shoten's Young Ace between June 2, 2017, and September 4, 2018. Yen Press announced at Anime Expo 2018 that they had licensed the new manga adaptation.

=== Film ===
A film based on the novels was released in 2008. Directed by Naoto Kumazawa, starring Kento Hayashi.

=== Anime ===
An anime television series aired from July 6 to September 21, 2017, on Fuji TV's Noitamina block. Kaoru Suzuki directed it at Zero-G, Touko Machida in charge of scripts and Yuki Hayashi in charge of music composition. The opening theme is "Taiyō mo Hitoribocchi" (The Sun Is Also Lonely) performed by Kyoto-based band Qyoto. The ending theme is "New World" performed by solo artist Yūta Hashimoto. It was streamed by Amazon on its Anime Strike. Sentai Filmworks acquired the license for the North American rights and gave the series a Blu-ray release in December 2018.

No.	Title (Note: All English titles are taken from Anime Strike.)	Original release date
1	"Dive to Blue"	July 6, 2017
2	"Concentration Dragon"	July 13, 2017
3	"Enter Shibuki"	July 20, 2017
4	"The Strong Men"	July 27, 2017
5	"The Days of Gray"	August 3, 2017
6	"Diamond Eyes"	August 10, 2017
7	"Dear Friends"	August 17, 2017
8	"So I Envy You!"	August 24, 2017
9	"Next Stage Coming"	August 31, 2017
10	"Meet the Monster"	September 7, 2017
11	"Final Stage"	September 14, 2017
12	"Concrete Dragon"	September 21, 2017

=== Drama ===
In April 2021, a live action drama series began airing in Japan. Three main actors are part of the idol group Hihi Jets.

== Reception ==
Anime News Network had five editors review the first episode of the anime: Theron Martin said that despite the animation not being eye-catching, he commended it for having likable characters with heart and setting up an intriguing story from the start; Paul Jensen was critical of both the male cast having dissimilar personalities and the art of diving only being half explained but said that a couple of episodes can help the series' narrative be more focused and capture the attention of genre viewers; James Beckett found the cast of male characters unappealing in terms of design and the diving scenes lacking in excitement but was optimistic of the Olympic plotline being able to put the series in the right direction; Rebecca Silverman felt that both plotlines involving the Mizuki Diving Club and Tomoki's arc weren't particularly interesting and the lack of characterization for Yoichi beyond his physique and being the sport's motivational spokesman. The fifth reviewer, Nick Creamer, criticized it for making the sport of diving sound boring, lacking any directional hook for both the story and its characters and being unimpressive in its animation, concluding that it "isn't necessarily the worst show I've watched this season, it probably does the most to squander its potential. Maybe check it out if you're really intrigued by the concept, but both the writing and visual problems here seem pretty insurmountable."

Silverman reviewed the first two volumes of the 2017 manga adaptation in 2019. Despite finding criticism in the characterization of Asaki and the story being too angst-ridden and poorly paced in places, she praised the focus on the characters' insecurities away from the sport (highlighting Tomoki's personal life) and the art for capturing the difficulties of diving, concluding that: "It certainly deserves to stand on its own merits rather than suffer from comparisons, and if you're looking for something a little less intense on the sports manga front than some of the other offerings out there, this is an interesting story."
