= Colorful (2000 film) =

- DVD cover
- Directed by: Shun Nakahara
- Screenplay by: Yoshimitsu Morita
- Based on: Karafuru by Eto Mori
- Produced by: Kanji Hagiwara; Yasuo Takahashi
- Starring: Koki Tanaka; Sawako Agawa; Sakae Takita; Kanako Magara; Asuka Komayu
- Cinematography: Junichi Fujisawa
- Edited by: Isao Tomita
- Music by: Shin'ichirō Ikebe
- Production companies: NHK Enterprises; Title Production Co., Ltd.
- Distributed by: Broadmedia Corporation
- Release date: October 7, 2000 (Japan)
- Running time: 98 minutes
- Country: Japan
- Language: Japanese

Colorful (Japanese: カラフル, Hepburn: Karafuru) is a 2000 Japanese supernatural fantasy drama film directed by Shun Nakahara and written by Yoshimitsu Morita. It is based on an award-winning novel of the same name by Eto Mori. The film stars Koki Tanaka in his first lead role in a feature film, as a soul given a second chance, reincarnated into the body of a fourteen-year-old boy who committed suicide. Sawako Agawa, Kanako Magara, Asuka Komayu and Yuki Kageyama also star in the film. Shin'ichirō Ikebe composed the film's soundtrack. Colorful was shown in competition at the 24th Montreal World Film Festival, where it was nominated for the Grand Prix des Amériques, before being theatrically released by Broadmedia Corporation on October 7, 2000, in Japan.

== Premise ==
The story follows a soul as it arrives in the afterlife, its body having just died. The afterlife takes the form of a train station, with the train leading to death. Though dejected and without its old memories, the soul meets an angel named Prapura, who informs the soul that it is lucky. Despite making many mistakes in life, the soul has been given a second chance. The soul will be put on "homestay" in the body of fourteen-year-old Makoto Kobayashi, who has just committed suicide. If the soul can remember and reflect on the mistakes of its previous life, it can return to the cycle of reincarnation.

The soul wakes up in the body of Makoto. Makoto is an introvert who doesn't have any friends, and his family doesn't seem to care about him. However, as the soul starts to live Makoto's life, the family notices a change in the boy. Meanwhile, the soul sees the duality of the people around it. In particular, it discovers that Makoto's mother is on the verge of an affair with her flamenco class instructor, while still pretending to be a dutiful wife. Eventually the soul realizes that humans are not "one color", but "colorful", with many different shades to their personalities. Makoto grows closer to the people around him and sees their true colors more clearly. Slowly, the misunderstandings between Makoto's family members are broken down, and a healing process commences.

== Cast ==
- Koki Tanaka as Makoto Kobayashi
- Sawako Agawa as Mother
- Sakae Takita as Father
- Kanako Magara as Sano
- Asuka Komayu as Hiroka Kuwabara
- Yuki Kageyama as Mitsuru, older brother
- Shinosuke Saito as Shin
- Jun Etoh as Doctor
- Sanshō Shinsui as Shin's father
- Soganoya Bundo as Prapura
- Toshirō Yanagiba as Dr. Sawada

== Background ==
The original novel was written by Eto Mori and published in Japan in 1998, where it sold over a million copies. It was first published in English in 2021, translated by Jocelyne Allen. The English translated version has received positive reviews. Mori's novel won the Sankei Children's Book Award in 1999, and has been adapted to film three times in total, with the other two being a 2010 animated film and Homestay, a 2018 Thai production.

== Release ==
Colorful was shown in competition at the 24th Montreal World Film Festival, where it was nominated for the Grand Prix des Amériques. It was theatrically released by Broadmedia Corporation on October 7, 2000, in Japan. The film was later released to DVD by Pioneer on January 25, 2002.

== Awards and nominations ==
24th Montreal World Film Festival

- Nominated: Grand Prix des Amériques (Shun Nakahara)
