= Naoyuki Agawa =

Japanese lawyer, diplomat, academic and author (1951–2024)

- Born: April 14, 1951; Tokyo
- Died: November 12, 2024 (aged 73)
- Education: Keio University
- Occupations: Lawyer, Diplomat, Academic and Author

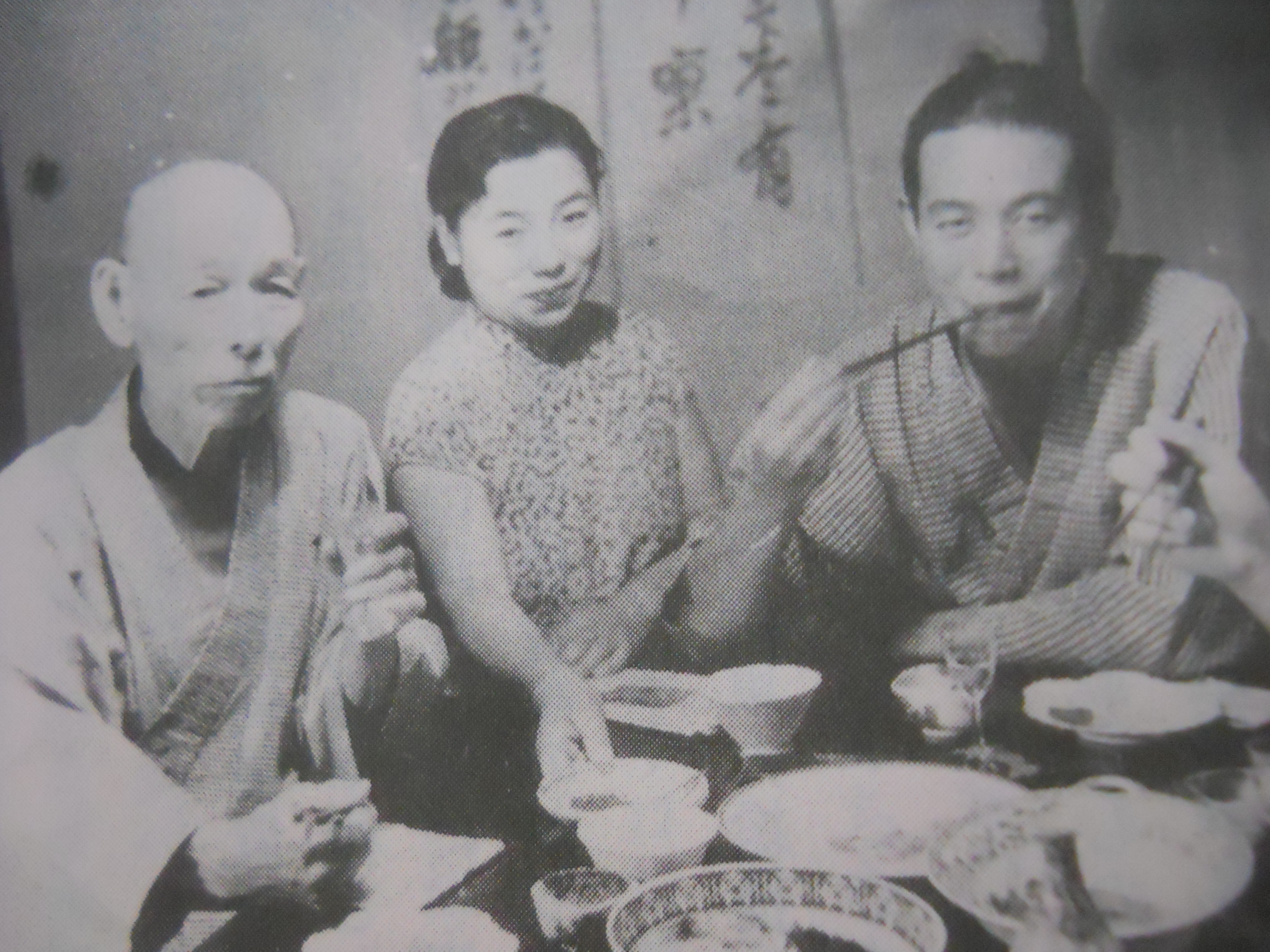
Agawa Family

Naoyuki Agawa (阿川 尚之, Agawa Naoyuki; April 14, 1951 – November 12, 2024) was a Japanese lawyer, diplomat, academic and author. He was a professor of law at Keio University from 1999; and from 2009, he served as the university's vice president for International Collaboration and Education.

== Early life and education ==
Naoyuki was born in Tokyo on April 14, 1951. He was the son of the novelist and historian Hiroyuki Agawa. His younger sister is the writer and Japanese television personality Sawako Agawa.

Naoyuki undergraduate education began at Keio University; but in 1975, he transferred in 1975 to Georgetown University in Washington, DC. He graduated magna cum laude in 1977 from the School of Foreign Service. He returned to Japan after earning his B.S.F.S.; but he would return to Georgetown, earning a J.D. degree in 1984.

== Career ==
In 1977, Naoyuki joined the Sony Corporation, working in Tokyo on matters relating to international trade and copyright law.

After completing law school, he practiced law—initially with the firm of Gibson, Dunn & Crutcher in Washington and Tokyo (1987–1995) and then with Nishimura & Partners in Tokyo (1995–1999).

In 1999, Naoyuki joined the Keio University faculty. He taught American constitutional law and history.

From 2002 through 2005, he served as Minister for Public Affairs at the Embassy of Japan in Washington.

Naoyuki returned to Keio in April 2005. He was elected Dean of the Faculty of Policy Management between June 2007 and June 2009. He became vice-president in charge of international affairs at Keio in July 2009.

After leaving the position of Vice-President he took up a position as professor of constitutional law at Doshisha University in Kyoto.

== Death ==
Agawa died on November 12, 2024, at the age of 73.

== Select works ==
Naoyuki Agawa's published writings encompass 8 works in 31 publications in 1 language and 168 library holdings.

- 2003 — それでも私は親米を貫く
- 2002 — 対論日本とアメリカ
- 2001 — 海の友情: 米国海軍と海上自衛隊
- 2001 — ジョン万次郎とその時代
- 1998 — わが英語今も旅の途中
- 1998 — アメリカが見つかりましたか: 戦前篇
- 1997 — 変わらぬアメリカを探して
- 1993 — アメリカが嫌いですか

== Honors ==
Agawa was distinguished in 2005 as the recipient of the Yomiuri-Yoshino Sakuzo Award.

== See also ==
- Sequentennial of Japanese Embassy to the United States
