= Hiroyuki Agawa =

Japanese author

Agawa Hiroyuki
- 阿川 弘之
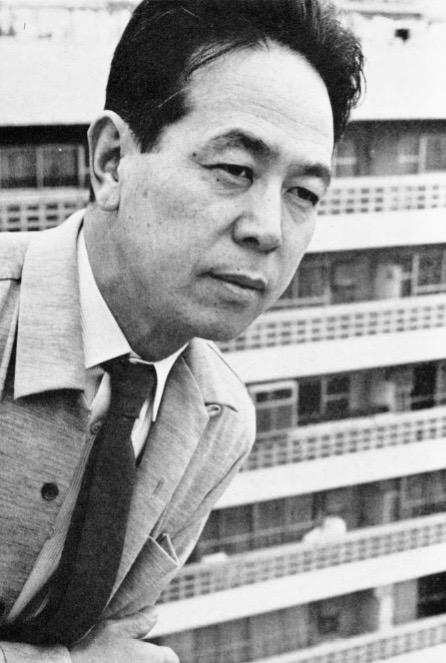
- Born: December 24, 1920
- Died: August 3, 2015 (aged 94)
- Writing career
- Language: Japanese

Hiroyuki Agawa (阿川 弘之, Agawa Hiroyuki; December 24, 1920 – August 3, 2015) was a Japanese author. He was known for his fiction centered on World War II, as well as his biographies and essays.

== Literary career ==
Agawa was born in Hiroshima, Japan. As a high school student Agawa was influenced by the Japanese author Naoya Shiga. He entered the Tokyo Imperial University to study Japanese literature. Upon graduation in 1942, Agawa was conscripted to serve in the Imperial Japanese Navy, where he worked as an intelligence officer breaking Chinese military codes until the end of the war. He returned to Hiroshima, where his parents had experienced the atomic bomb, in March 1946.

After World War II Agawa wrote his first short story Nennen Saisai (Years upon Years, 1946), which was a classic I Novel, or autobiographical novel, recounting the reunion with his parents. It follows the style of Naoya Shiga, who is said to have praised the work. August 6 as Agawa notes in a postscript, combines the stories of friends and acquaintances, who experienced the bombing into the testimony of one family. Occupation censorship at the time was strict, but the story passed because, the author later observed, "it made no reference to the problems of after-effect and continued no overt criticism of the U.S." Agawa came to popular and critical attention with his Citadel in Spring (春の城, 1952), which was awarded the Yomiuri Prize. (He later revisited the same theme of his experiences as a student soldier in Kurai hato (Dark waves, 1974)). Ma no isan (Devil's Heritage, 1953), a documentary novel, is an account of the bombing of Hiroshima through the eyes of a young Tokyo reporter, handling, among other topics, the death of his Hiroshima nephew and survivors' reactions to the Atomic bomb Casualty Commission, the U.S. agency that conducted research on atomic victims.

Agawa's four major biographical novels are Yamamoto Isoroku (山本五十六, 1965), Yonai Mitsumasa (米内光政, 1978), Inoue Seibi (井上成美, 1986), and Shiga Naoya (志賀直哉, 1994). His other major works include Kumo no bohyo (Grave markers in the clouds, 1955), and Gunkan Nagato no shogai (The life of the warship Nagato, 1975).

Agawa was awarded the Order of Culture (Bunka Kunsho) in 1999.

He is the father of Sawako Agawa, popular author and TV personality, and Naoyuki Agawa, professor of law at Keio University.

== Bibliography ==
Year	Japanese Title	English Title	Genre/Comments
1946	年年歳歳; Nennen Saisai	From Age to Age in ISBN 978-0-23113-804-8	I Novel; Agawa's first literary work; translation by Eric P. Cunningham
1952	春の城; Haru no shiro	Citadel in Spring; ISBN 978-0-87011-960-6; ISBN 978-4-7700-1460-3	Autobiographical novel; describes the atomic bombing of Hiroshima; translation by Lawrence Rogers, 1990.
1953	魔の遺産; Ma no isan	Devil's heritage	Documentary novel; following the aftermath of the atomic bomb attack on Hiroshima, translation by John M. Maki, 1957.
1955	雲の墓標; Kumo no bohyō	Burial in the Clouds; ISBN 978-0-8048-3759-0	Documentary war novel; based on the diary of Iwao Yoshii, a former Kamikaze pilot. Trans. by Teruyo Shimizu, 2006. Movie adaptation by Shochiku in 1957.
1957	夜の波音; Yoru no namioto		Short stories
1959	カリフォルニヤ; California		I Novel
1960	坂の多い町; Saka no ooi machi		Short stories
1961	青葉の翳り; Aoba no kageri		Short stories
1966	舷燈; Gentō		I Novel
1967	軍艦ポルカ; Gunkan polka		Short stories
1968	水の上の会話; Mizu no ue no kaiwa		Short stories
1969	山本五十六; Yamamoto Isoroku	The Reluctant Admiral: Yamamoto and the Imperial Navy; ISBN 978-0-87011-355-0; ISBN 978-4-7700-2539-5	Biography; translation by John Bester, with some abridgment approved by Agawa, 1979
1973	暗い波濤; Kurai hatō		War novel (partly autobiographical)
1975	軍艦長門の生涯; Gunkan Nagato no shōgai		Documentary novel
1978	米内光政; Yonai Mitsumasa		Biography
1982	テムズの水; Thames no mizu		Short stories
1986	井上成美; Inoue Seibi		Biography
1994	志賀直哉; Shiga Naoya		Biography
2004	亡き母や; Naki haha ya		I Novel

== Prizes ==
- 1952 Yomiuri Prize - Citadel in Spring, (Haru no shiro,「春の城」)
- 1966 Shincho Literary Prize - The Reluctant Admiral (Yamamoto Isoroku,「山本五十六」)
- 1987 Nippon Grand Literary Prize - Inoue Seibi (「井上成美」)
- 1994 Noma Literary Prize - Shiga Naoya (「志賀直哉」)
- 2002 Yomiuri Prize - Shokumi-Buburoku (「食味風々録」)
- 2007 Kikuchi Kan Prize

== Sources ==
- J'Lit | Authors : Hiroyuki Agawa | Books from Japan
- Contemporary Authors Online, Gale, 2002
- Burial in the Clouds, Tuttle Pub. info
- Atomic Bomb Literature: A Bibliography
- JSTOR, Citadel in Spring review
