= Dialogue (EP) =

EP by Ayase
- Released: May 27, 2026
- Length: 14:50
- Language: Japanese
- Labels: Echoes; Sony Japan
- Producer: Ayase

Ayase chronology
Mikunoyoasobi (2021)	Dialogue (2026)

Singles from Dialogue
- 1. "Urusa" Released: May 20, 2026

Dialogue is the third (Note: Media outlets and Ayase himself regard Dialogue as his first EP as a singer-songwriter, which exclude Vocaloid EPs Ghost City Tokyo and Mikunoyoasobi.) EP by Japanese musician and record producer Ayase. It was released on May 27, 2026, through Echoes and Sony Music Entertainment Japan. A follow-up to Mikunoyoasobi (2021), the EP marked Ayase's first album recorded with his own vocals, departing from previous Vocaloid voicebank Hatsune Miku.

== Background ==
Ayase released his first two EPs, Ghost City Tokyo (2019) and Mikunoyoasobi (2021), both featured vocals from Vocaloid software voicebank Hatsune Miku. Originally published on YouTube, he commercially released his self-cover of two tracks from Ghost City Tokyo, "Yoru Naderu Menō" and "Yūrei Tōkyō" on September 8, 2021, which the former gained popularity on social media, and peaked at number 25 on the Billboard Japan Hot 100. In 2022, Ayase released his first single recorded with his own vocals instead of Vocaloid, "Hōwa", alongside his self-cover of "Cinema", on September 30.

== Production and theme ==
Dialogue consists of five tracks, entirely written, arranged, produced, and contributed vocals by Ayase. Considered as the "origin and starting point" of his solo career, following Vocaloid and Yoasobi careers, he described the EP as a "collection of songs that sublimate genuine emotions in daily life and musical activities into music," centering on the theme of " 'dialogue' with himself, the various people and things he interacts with, and society," and showing his more personal and raw side.

== Release and promotion ==
On May 18, 2026, Ayase announced his EP, titled Dialogue, along with its cover artwork and track list. The second track, "Urusa", was available as its lead single two days later, on May 20, and its music video, directed by Takuya Setomitsu, premiered on June 3. The EP was released on May 27 via digital music and streaming platforms. On the same day, to commemorate the release, Ayase launched his new YouTube channel, separated from Yoasobi channel, and uploaded visualizers for the EP's all tracks.

Ayase appeared as a guest on FM802's Music Freaks on May 31, and J-Wave's Sparks on June 9. He also gave interviews for Rolling Stone Japan, Wired Japan, and Numéro Tokyo. Ayase surprisingly appeared at Prada and Gentle Monster's collaboration event in Tokyo on July 2 to perform "Urusa" live for the first time. The music video for the EP's track, "Planets", was uploaded on August 28. The limited vinyl edition of the EP is set to be released on December 2, 2026.

== Track listing ==
All tracks are written by Ayase.

Dialogue track listing
No.	Title	Length
1.	"Planets"	3:04
2.	"Urusa" (うるさ)	3:13
3.	"Bad Therapy"	2:43
4.	"Hibana" (火花)	3:18
5.	"Dialogue"	2:30
Total length:		14:50

== Credits and personnel ==
- Ayase – vocals (all), writing (all), production (all), arrangement (all)
- Ash – guitar (1, 5)
- Sota Morimitsu – bass (1, 3, 5)

== Charts ==
Chart performance for Dialogue
Chart (2026)	Peak position
Japanese Digital Albums (Oricon)	4

== Release history ==
Release dates and formats for Dialogue
Region	Date	Format	Label	Ref.
Various	May 27, 2026	Digital download; streaming	Echoes; Sony Japan	
Japan	December 2, 2026	LP	Echoes; Sony Japan	
