= Colorful (2010 film) =

2010 film by Keiichi Hara

- Theatrical release poster
- Directed by: Keiichi Hara
- Screenplay by: Miho Maruo
- Based on: Colorful by Eto Mori
- Produced by: Hiroyuki Seta; Yoshitaka Kawaguchi; Yutaka Sugiyama; Atsuhiro Iwakami; Hiroaki Sano; Akihiro Yamauchi
- Starring: Kazato Tomizawa; Aoi Miyazaki; Akina Minami; Michael; Jingi Irie; Keiji Fujiwara; Akiyoshi Nakao; Kumiko Asō; Katsumi Takahashi
- Cinematography: Kōichi Yanai
- Edited by: Toshihiko Kojima
- Music by: Kow Otani
- Production companies: Sunrise (production); Ascension (animation)
- Distributed by: Toho
- Release date: August 21, 2010
- Running time: 127 minutes
- Country: Japan
- Language: Japanese
- Box office: $3.9 million (Japan)

Colorful (Japanese: カラフル) is a 2010 Japanese animated feature film directed by Keiichi Hara. It is based on the novel of the same name written by Eto Mori, produced by Sunrise and animated by the animation studio Ascension. It also deals with some of the pressures on school children as they come up to graduation before entering college or university.

== Plot ==
Upon reaching the train station to death, a dejected soul is informed that he is "lucky" and will have another chance at life though he does not want it. He is placed in the body of a 14-year-old boy named Makoto Kobayashi, who has just committed suicide by an overdose of pills. Watched over by a neutral spirit named Purapura in the form of a little boy, the soul must figure out what his greatest sin and mistake was in his former life before his six-month time limit in Makoto's body runs out. He also has a number of other lesser duties he must complete, such as understanding what led Makoto to commit suicide in the first place.

He finds Makoto did not like his family and he greatly dislikes them for the same reasons. He is contemptuous of his father who is an underdog at work, forced to work much overtime. Despite her efforts, he hates his mother who had an affair with a dance instructor, something his father seems to be oblivious to. His older brother, Mitsuru, has given up on him because he is too moody and has no friends at school. He discovers that a girl he fancies, Hiroka, sells sex to older men so she can have the clothes and things she wants. Shoko is a weird girl from Makoto's class who becomes suspicious of his unusual behavior, so he tries to stay away from her. After he gets mugged and beaten up by some delinquents, Shoko comes to visit Makoto at his house, but he scares her off. In one of their subsequent encounters, Purapura explains that Makoto will really die this time after his six months expire. However, when he befriends Saotome, a boy in his class who accepts outcasts such as him and treats them as equals, Makoto sees the joy in life for the first time. They spend some time together and they even begin studying for their high school entrance exam, something for which neither of them had any ambition before.

Knowing that his brother will never get accepted to a public high school due to his bad grades and lack of interest, Mitsuru announces that he will postpone his college entrance exams in order to allow his parents to save some money so they can send Makoto to a private school. Makoto refuses and tells his parents and brother that he has already chosen Tamegawa High (a public school he and Saotome agreed on earlier). An aggravated Mitsuru is unable to comprehend his unwillingness to accept his family's help and asks him if he enjoys tormenting his own family. Makoto breaks into tears and says that he just wanted to go to the same school his only friend is going to apply to, which leads to his parents accepting his wish. With his deadline reaching its end, Makoto meets with Purapura for one last time. He announces that he has found out what his former life's mistake was. He reveals that he's none other but the soul of Makoto Kobayashi and his mistake was that he killed himself. Purapura tells him that he will keep on living, but that he will also erase his memories of Purapura in order to make Makoto not think that he has any more chances. Before wiping his memories, Purapura advises him to live a colorful life.

== Voice cast ==
Character	Cast	
Character	Japanese	English dub
Makoto Kobayashi	Kazato Tomizawa	Greg Ayres
Saotome	Jingi Irie	Clint Bickham
Hiroka Kuwabara	Akina Minami	Emily Neves
Shoko Sano	Aoi Miyazaki	Brittney Karbowski
Mitsuru (Makoto's Brother)	Akiyoshi Nakao	Chris Patton
Makoto's Mother	Kumiko Asō	Carli Mosier
Makoto's Father	Katsumi Takahashi	David Wald
Purapura	Michael Murakami (credited as Michael)	Luci Christian
Mr. Sawada	Keiji Fujiwara	David Matranga
Mao	Manatsu Hayashi	Genevieve Simmons
Doctor	Hideyuki Tanaka	Mark X Laskowski

== Reception ==
The film won the award for Excellent Animation of the Year at the 34th Japan Academy Prize and is nominated for Animation of the Year. It won the Animation Film Award at the 65th Mainichi Film Awards. It also won the Excellence Award for animation in the 14th Japan Media Arts Festival. Internationally, it received the Audience Award and Special Distinction prize at the 2011 Annecy International Animated Film Festival.

== See also ==
- Colorful, the first live-action adaptation of the novel directed by Shun Nakahara
- Homestay, a 2018 Thai live-action adaptation of the novel
