= Hajimete no =

Short story collection by Rio Shimamoto, Mizuki Tsujimura, Miyuki Miyabe and Eto Mori

- Tankōbon edition cover
- Author: Rio Shimamoto; Mizuki Tsujimura; Miyuki Miyabe; Eto Mori
- Original title: はじめての
- Language: Japanese
- Genre: Short story collection
- Publisher: Suirinsha (tankōbon); Bunshun Bunko (bunkobon)
- Publication date: February 16, 2022
- Publication place: Japan
- Media type: Print (tankōbon, bunkobon)
- Pages: 224 (tankōbon); 240 (bunkobon)
- ISBN: 978-4-16-401004-4
- Website: yoasobi-music.jp/hajimeteno

Hajimete no (Japanese: はじめての; lit. 'The First Time Of') is a short story collection by Japanese novelists Rio Shimamoto, Mizuki Tsujimura, Miyuki Miyabe, and Eto Mori under the theme of "a story to read when you do [something] for the first time" in collaboration with Japanese duo Yoasobi to perform songs based on the stories. Suirinsha published it in tankōbon format on February 16, 2022. The bunkobon edition came out on October 6, 2026.

The collection comprises Shimamoto's Watashi Dake no Shoyūsha, Tsujimura's Yūrei, Miyabe's Iro Chigai no Trump, and Mori's Hikari no Tane, resulting the songs "Mr.", "Umi no Manimani", "Seventeen", and "Suki da", respectively. All songs appeared on the EP Hajimete no – EP, released on May 10, 2023. Upon its publication, Hajimete no received positive reviews and sold 13,000 copies in its first week, according to Oricon. It was also adapted into readers theater in 2023 and 2024.

== History ==
On December 1, 2021, the same day as the EP The Book 2 release, Yoasobi announced a collaboration with novelists Rio Shimamoto, Mizuki Tsujimura, Miyuki Miyabe, and Eto Mori, who all won Naoki Prize, to write short stories for the book titled Hajimete no. The theme of "a story to read when you do [something] for the first time", the short stories consists of Shimamoto's Watashi Dake no Shoyūsha, Tsujimura's Yūrei, Miyabe's Iro Chigai no Trump, and Mori's Hikari no Tane. Yoasobi would be in charge of producing and performing songs based on all short stories.

Surinsha first published Hajimete no on February 16, 2022, in tankōbon format, alongside the release of the first song based on Shimamoto's short story "Mr.". The Taiwanese edition was published by Crown Publishing on July 10, 2023. Two more songs were released in 2022: "Suki da", sourced from Mori's story, on May 30; and "Umi no Manimani", based on Tsujimura's story, on November 18. The last song "Seventeen", sourced from Miyabe's story, came on March 27, 2023. All songs are featured on the book's companion EP Hajimete no – EP, released on May 10, 2023. The bunkobon edition was published on October 6, 2026, by Bunshun Bunko.

100 promotional videos for the book, voiced texts from all four stories by Ikura and 99 other voice actors, were used as a commercial airing during the 2022 World Figure Skating Championships broadcast via Fuji TV, as well as on the duo's social media. Yoasobi, sometimes alongside the writers, promoted Hajimete no by giving interviews in various media, such as magazines Da Vinci and Aera, newspaper The Yomiuri Shimbun, radio show Takahiro Inoue Doyōbi no "A", and television shows Mezamashi TV and Tetsuko's Room, etc.

== Contents ==
Title	Writer	Song	Plot
Watashi Dake no Shoyūsha (私だけの所有者; "My only owner")	Rio Shimamoto	"Mr."	A story when you first fall in love: What happening between "Boku" and their owner? "Boku" was protected by a facility in a certain country, and started writing letters to their "Sensei", Mr. Naruse.
Yūrei (ユーレイ; "Ghost")	Mizuki Tsujimura	"Umi no Manimani"	A story when you first run away from home: After running away from home, I got off at a seaside train station, and suddenly, a mysterious girl, who holds a bouquet, called out to me in the beach at night.
Iro Chigai no Trump (色違いのトランプ; "Color-different playing cards")	Miyuki Miyabe	"Seventeen"	A story when you first become a suspect: Natsuho, Sōichi's beloved daughter, was arrested on suspicion of being involved in a terrorist attack that occurred in a parallel world. To save Natsuho, Sōichi goes alone to another "mirror world".
Hikari no Tane (ヒカリノタネ; "Seeds of light")	Eto Mori	"Suki da"	A story when you first confess: Yuma, a high school girl who is irresistibly fond of her childhood friend Shiita, tries to erase her past confessions to secure her fourth confession.

== Reception ==
Tomonori Shiba of Real Sound praised Hajimete no for the excitement it conveys, the troupe's fun, and its tricks. He was also sure that "many young readers will consider this work their 'first book,' " because of "a wide frontage that even teens can easily get into." Writing for Good Life with Books, Moe Oshikiri reviewed that the book, "even with the same theme, the worlds depicted are varied," and "span a wide range of genres, from science fiction to fantasy, mystery, and teen drama." According to Oricon, Hajimete no debuted at number eight on the weekly Books Chart dated February 28, 2022, selling 13,379 copies in its first week. The bunkobon edition sold 4,281 copies between October 5 and 11, 2026, reaching number 27 of the Oricon Bunko Chart.

== Adaptation and sequel ==
Room NB Co. Ltd adapted Hajimete no into a readers theater, performed at Yomiuri Ōtemachi Hall between January 7 and 9, 2023, and at Theater 1010 from January 6 to 8, 2024. Starting in 2022, Yoasobi, Shimamoto, Tsujimura, Miyabe, and Mori, Suirinsha, and creative writing social media Monogatary.com carried out the sequel project, titled Hajimete no Bungei-bu (『はじめての』文芸部; lit. 'Hajimete no literature club'), to discover new novelists. Kozumu Ayane's Kono Roku de mo Nai Yatsu Shika Inai Sekai de, Rei Hachikawa's Restart, Naruse Hazuki's Shiawase no Katachi, and Yoa Mabyō's Senpai o Koroshitai no de Josō Suru were selected, among 634 entries.

== Hajimete no – EP ==
Hajimete no – EP
- Digital cover

EP by Yoasobi
- Released: May 10, 2023
- Genre: J-pop
- Length: 14:19
- Language: Japanese
- Label: Sony Japan
- Producer: Ayase

Yoasobi chronology
E-Side 2 (2022)	Hajimete no – EP (2023)	The Book 3 (2023)

Singles from Hajimete no – EP
- 1. "Mr." Released: February 16, 2022; 2. "Suki da" Released: May 30, 2022; 3. "Umi no Manimani" Released: November 18, 2022; 4. "Seventeen" Released: March 27, 2023

On March 27, 2023, following the release of "Seventeen", Yoasobi announced an EP, collected all tracks based on short stories written in Hajimete no, titled Hajimete no – EP (はじめての - EP). It was released on May 10, 2023, through Sony Music Entertainment Japan. The physical formats came in five versions: four are Mini CD with different short story and cover, and a complete edition contains 12 cm CD and Blu-ray including the duo's selected live performances from Rock in Japan Festival, and Sweet Love Shower in 2022.

To promote the EP, fan art goods inspired by each track from Hajimete no – EP's music videos were sold at MashRoom Cafe online store. Yoasobi, alongside all novelists who wrote the short stories, appeared on the special program NHK Music Special, titled NHK Music Special Yoasobi: Shōsetsu o Ongaku ni Suru Mahō (小説を音楽にする魔法; lit. "Magic of novel into music"), on May 11, to talk about behind-the-scenes of the project, and give debut televised performances of all tracks from the EP. Commercially, the EP peaked at number nine on the Oricon Singles Chart, and sold 11,846 copies as of May.

=== Track listing ===
All tracks are written by Ayase.

Hajimete no – EP track listing
No.	Title	Length
1.	"Seventeen" (セブンティーン)	3:19
2.	"Umi no Manimani" (海のまにまに)	4:16
3.	"Suki da" (好きだ)	3:38
4.	"Mr." (ミスター)	3:05
Total length:		14:19

Hajimete no – EP – complete edition (Blu-ray)
No.	Title	Length
1.	"Halzion" (2022.8.6 Rock in Japan Festival 2022)
2.	"Mō Sukoshi Dake" (2022.8.6 Rock in Japan Festival 2022)
3.	"Mr." (2022.8.6 Rock in Japan Festival 2022)
4.	"Moshi mo Inochi ga Egaketara" (2022.8.6 Rock in Japan Festival 2022)
5.	"Suki da" (2022.8.6 Rock in Japan Festival 2022)
6.	"Gunjō" (2022.8.6 Rock in Japan Festival 2022)
7.	"Yoru ni Kakeru" (2022.8.28 Sweet Love Shower 2022)
8.	"Sangenshoku" (2022.8.28 Sweet Love Shower 2022)
9.	"Taishō Roman" (2022.8.28 Sweet Love Shower 2022)
10.	"Encore" (2022.8.28 Sweet Love Shower 2022)
11.	"Kaibutsu" (2022.8.28 Sweet Love Shower 2022)
12.	"Tsubame" (2022.8.28 Sweet Love Shower 2022)
Total length:		60:19

=== Credits and personnel ===
- Ayase – songwriter, producer
- Ikura – vocals
- Zaquro Misohagi – chorus (4)
- Takakeru – guitar (1)
- AssH – guitar (3)
- Miyuki Miyabe – based story writer (1)
- Mizuki Tsujimura – based story writer (2)
- Eto Mori – based story writer (3)
- Rio Shimamoto – based story writer (4)
- Takayuki Saitō – vocal recording
- Masahiko Fukui – mixing
- Hidekazu Sakai – mastering

=== Charts ===
==== Weekly charts ====
Weekly chart performance for Hajimete no – EP (Note: Oricon, Billboard Japan, and retail stores considered Hajimete no – EP to be a quadruple A-side single.)
Chart (2023)	Peak position
Japan (Oricon)	9
Japan Combined Singles (Oricon)	9
Japan Top Singles Sales (Billboard Japan)	12

==== Monthly charts ====
Monthly chart performance for Hajimete no – EP
Chart (2023)	Position
Japan (Oricon)	23

=== Release history ===
Release dates and formats for Hajimete no – EP
Region	Date	Format	Label	Ref.
Various	May 10, 2023	Digital download; streaming	Sony Japan	
Japan	May 10, 2023	Mini CD; CD+Blu-ray	Sony Japan	
Taiwan	May 19, 2023	Mini CD; CD+Blu-ray	Sony Taiwan	
