= Sawako Agawa =

Japanese author and television personality

- 阿川 佐和子
- Born: 1 November 1953 (age 72); Tokyo, Japan
- Education: Keio University (BA)
- Occupations: Author and television personality
- Parent: Hiroyuki Agawa

Sawako Agawa (阿川 佐和子, Agawa Sawako; born 1 November 1953) is a Japanese author and television personality.

== Early life ==
Sawako Agawa was born in Tokyo on 1 November 1953. Her father is the novelist Hiroyuki Agawa; and her elder brother Naoyuki Agawa is a former diplomat who, since 1999, has been a professor of law at Keio University.

After graduation from Toyo Eiwa junior high school and high school (a private all-girls school, Christian school located in Minato, Tokyo), Agawa graduated from Keio University with the Bachelor of Letters degree in Western Historiography. She writes for Shūkan Bunshun.

== Career ==
Agawa started her career in Japanese television, first as a reporter, then as a news reader. She appears on a variety of programs, including talk shows, quiz programs, and interview shows. In 1992 she became an interviewer, conducting 1,000 interviews with a wide variety of people including actors, athletes, and writers.

== Filmography ==
=== Films ===
- Colorful (2000), Mother
- Nishino Yukihiko no Koi to Bōken (2014), Sayuri Sasaki
- Homestay (2022)
- Egoist (2023)
- The Boy and the Heron (2023), Eriko (voice)

=== Television ===
- Toto Neechan (2016), Shizuko Sawa
- Rikuoh (2017), Akemi Masaoka
- Anata no Soba de Ashita ga Warau (2021)

== Honours and awards ==
Honours

| Year | Honour | Ref. |
|---|---|---|
| 2014 | Kikuchi Kan Prize | |

Awards

| Year | Award | Category | Nominated work | Result | Ref. |
|---|---|---|---|---|---|
| 2018 | 11th Tokyo Drama Awards | Best Supporting Actress | Rikuoh | Won | |
| 2023 | 36th Nikkan Sports Film Awards | Best Supporting Actress | Egoist | Nominated | |
| 2024 | 78th Mainichi Film Awards | Best Supporting Actress | Egoist | Nominated | |
| 2024 | 66th Blue Ribbon Awards | Best Supporting Actress | Egoist | Nominated | |
