= A School Frozen in Time =

Japanese novel series

冷たい校舎の時は止まる (Tsumetai Kōsha no Toki wa Tomaru)
- Genre: Mystery
- Novel series
- Written by: Mizuki Tsujimura
- Published by: Kodansha
- Original run: June 8, 2004 – August 6, 2004
- Volumes: 4
- Manga
- Written by: Mizuki Tsujimura
- Illustrated by: Naoshi Arakawa
- Published by: Kodansha
- English publisher: NA: Vertical
- Magazine: Monthly Shōnen Magazine
- Original run: December 2007 – April 2009
- Volumes: 4

A School Frozen in Time (Japanese: 冷たい校舎の時は止まる, Hepburn: Tsumetai Kōsha no Toki wa Tomaru) is a Japanese novel series written by Mizuki Tsujimura. It was published by Kodansha in three volumes, from June to August 2004.

A manga adaptation, illustrated by Naoshi Arakawa, was serialized in Kodansha's Monthly Shōnen Magazine from December 2007 to April 2009 and later published in four tankōbon volumes. The manga is licensed in English by Vertical.

== Synopsis ==
In the winter of their third year in high school, eight students gather in the snow and are trapped in an empty school building. While no one but the eight class representatives are in sight, they realize they cannot remember the name of the classmate that committed suicide during the school festival. Against the looming terror of 5:53 and confronting the darkness of their past, they search for the name of their classmate.

== Characters ==
=== Main ===
Hiroshi Takano (鷹野 博嗣, Takano Hiroshi)
Third-year student at Seinan Gakuin High School, the number one prep school in the prefecture. He is a childhood friend of Mizuki, and they go to and from school together. He is a calm and friendly person who wears glasses. He is a B-class scholarship student with excellent grades and exemption from admission fees. Former member of the track and field team. He wants to study law at T University. His homeroom teacher, Sakaki, is his cousin, and they are often mistaken for brothers because of their similar appearances. He is an honor student trusted by his teachers, but he has experience smoking and playing mahjong.
Mizuki Tsujimura (辻村 深月, Tsujimura Mizuki)
Third-year student at Seinan Gakuin High School. She is a childhood friend of Hiroshi and his cousin Sakaki. She has a bright and kind personality but is emotionally vulnerable. She is the manager of the track and field team. She met Haruko Tsunoda when they were in the same class in second grade. As exams got closer, Mizuki became an outlet for Haruko's frustration with her schoolwork and was anorexic at one point. Because of this, Akihiko believes Mizuki was the one that committed suicide, but thanks to the support of Tatsu Takano, the class representative at the time, she is able to return to a normal life.
Sugawara (菅原, Sugawara)
Third-year student at Seinan Gakuin High School. He looks like a delinquent with brown hair and an ear piercing and was suspended for gambling mahjong and smoking. Though he acts like a bad guy, he is a feminist and passionate person. He aspires to be a teacher. When he was in junior high school, his mother asked him to help out at Sunflower that his father, the chairman of the PTA, had donated. He meets Hiro-kun and Hiro-chan, two elementary school students with the same nickname, and Sato-chan, a student at Seinan at the time. It culminated in a love rivalry with Hiro-chan over Sato-chan. In the summer of the second year of junior high, Hiro-chan is involved in a forced suicide of his mother and dies young. At his funeral, he finds out that Hiro-chan had given Sato-chan the earrings he bought at the summer festival and wanted to give Sugawara one. He since stopped going to Sunflower House.
Rika Saeki (佐伯 梨香, Saeki Rika)
Third-year student at Seinan Gakuin High School. She is in love with Sakaki, which is well-known even by Sakaki. She has been childhood friends with Keiko since elementary school. Like Sugawara, she wants to be a teacher. She has two younger sisters, Saya, a high school student, and Yumiko, an elementary school student, and lives with her divorced mother. She met Sakaki in her first year when he was an assistant homeroom teacher. When she was struggling due to her family circumstances or being beaten by Yamazaki, her homeroom teacher at the time, she fell in love with Sakaki who would always save her.
Akihiko Fujimoto (藤本 昭彦, Fujimoto Akihiko)
Third-year student at Seinan Gakuin High School. He is always calm and somewhat philosophical. According to Keiko, he is a feminist who does not show ulterior motives, and is popular with the girls. However, due to his mature attitude, he clashes with Rika. When he was in junior high school, he became a classmate of Yutaka Sawaguchi, who was a victim of bullying. Sawaguchi, who somewhat relied on Fujimoto, a bystander of the bullying, eventually commits suicide by hanging himself. Akihiko, who worried about Sawaguchi for a long time, ends up getting bullied by Haruko in his second year at Seinan. Akihiko was the first person Mizuki confessed to about Haruko, and from there the others understand the situation.
Keiko Kirino (桐野 景子, Kirino Keiko)
Third-year student at Seinan Gakuin High School. Her parents are both doctors, and she wants to go to medical school. She serves as the vice president of the student council. She is an androgynous beauty who was popular with girls in junior high school. Since she was in elementary school, she had a tutor named Makimura, but after Keiko was dumped by her boyfriend and troubled, he began to have selfish ideals for her. She sensed that he rejected her feminine side, and after realizing she was dreaming about him, the relationship became creepy. He eventually quit as her tutor.
Mitsuru Katase (片瀬 充, Katase Mitsuru)
Third-year student at Seinan Gakuin High School. He has a mild and timid personality. He is in love with Rika, which is well-known even by Rika.
Ayame Shimizu (清水 あやめ, Shimizu Ayame)
Third-year student at Seinan Gakuin High School. She is an A-class scholarship student who is exempt from admission and tuition fees. She also belongs to the art club and won a painting competition. Aspires to go to T University.
Sakaki (榊, Sakaki)
Takano's homeroom teacher and cousin. He has brown hair and gold earrings. His students trust him so much that they visit him at his house. He is an alumnus of Seinan.

=== Other ===
Haruko Tsunoda (角田 春子, Tsunoda Haruko)
Third-year student at Seinan Gakuin High School. She helped Mizuki with her job as the manager for the track and field team but took a break to focus on her impending exams. However, even though Mizuki continued to be the manager her grades were better than Haruko's. She was in love with Takano in her first year at Seinan.
Yūji Suwa (諏訪裕二, Suwa Yūji)
Third-year student at Seinan Gakuin High School. President of the student council and the son of a politician. Like Takano, he is a B-class scholarship student. He attended the same junior high school as Keiko, where he was the student council president, and she was the head of the election committee. He gradually falls for Keiko, and invites her to be the vice president of the student council. Though he confesses to Keiko the day before the school festival, she dumps him despite their mutual feelings because she feels she is restricting him.
Amamiya (雨宮, Amamiya)
Takano's classmate. She was supposedly in charge of the reception for the school festival with Mitsuru. She told Akihiko that Sawaguchi's younger brother had visited, and provides Mitsuru information about Shōko Yamaguchi.
Hiro-kun (ヒロくん, Hirokun)
Elementary school student who went to Sunflower.
Hiro-chan (ヒロちゃん, Hirochan)
His real name is Hironao Maraya. His father is Japanese, and his mother is Filipina. He speaks fluent English and attends a different elementary school than Hiro-kun. His father rarely comes home, and his mother works late into the night. He is involved in his mother's forced suicide and is stabbed with a kitchen knife. He was hospitalized after an emergency surgery and dies suddenly at the age of seven.
Mī-chan (みーちゃん, Mīchan)
Elementary school student who doesn't attend Sunflower. She was Hiro-kun's girlfriend and was often ridiculed by Sugawara over their relationship. She asks Sugawara to buy a ring for Hiro-kun to give to Mī-chan.
Sato-chan (サトちゃん, Satochan)
Attended Seinan Gakuin High School when Sugawara was in junior high school. She has a gentle and kind personality and was liked by the students at Sunflower. Sugawara was in love with her and decided to go to Seinan because of that. When she was in elementary school, she had a past at Sunflower, so she came to help even as a high schooler. She is good at English and interpreted for Hiro-chan's mother, who could not speak Japanese well. She is also half Japanese with a foreigner mother. After Sato-chan graduated from Seinan, Sugawara hears rumors that she was admitted into the Faculty of Education at a prestigious national university.

== Media ==
=== Novels ===
The series was written by Mizuki Tsujimura, and published by Kodansha in three volumes released from June 8, 2004, to August 6, 2004. The series was re-published in two volumes on August 11, 2007. It was the first published work by Tsujimura.

==== Volumes ====
===== Original release =====
No.	Japanese release date	Japanese ISBN
1	June 8, 2004	978-4-06-182375-4
2	July 6, 2004	978-4-06-182378-5
3	August 6, 2004	978-4-06-182382-2

===== Re-release =====
No.	Japanese release date	Japanese ISBN
1	August 11, 2007	978-4-06-275822-2
2	August 11, 2007	978-4-06-275823-9

=== Manga ===
A manga adaptation, illustrated by Naoshi Arakawa, was serialized in Monthly Shōnen Magazine from December 2007 to April 2009. Kodansha published the series in four volumes. It was Arakawa's first work that was serialized in a magazine.

On June 17, 2020, Vertical announced they licensed the series for English publication. The series is also licensed in Taiwan by Tong Li Publishing.

=== Volumes ===
No.	Original release date	Original ISBN	English release date	English ISBN
1	November 17, 2008	978-4-06-375598-5	April 6, 2021	978-1-94-998049-3
2	November 17, 2008	978-4-06-375599-2	June 15, 2021	978-1-64-729042-9
3	March 17, 2009	978-4-06-375673-9	September 14, 2021	978-1-64-729051-1
4	May 15, 2009	978-4-06-375716-3	November 23, 2021	978-1-64-729073-3

== Reception ==
The novel series was awarded the Mephisto Prize in 2004.

Demelza from Anime UK News praised the first volume of the manga adaptation for its characters, story, and artwork, ultimately stating "it [delivered] a memorable experience".
