= Sesquicentennial of Japanese Embassy to the United States =

The Sesquicentennial of Japanese Embassy to the United States in 2010 marked the 150th anniversary of the first Japanese diplomatic mission to the United States in 1860. The purpose of the 1860 Japanese diplomatic mission was to ratify the Treaty of Friendship, Commerce and Navigation, which had been signed several years earlier.

The initial Japan-US treaties opened the port of Edo and four other Japanese cities to American trade. In 2010, the sesquicentennial commemorated the extent to which the Japanese ambassadors and their party affected subsequent bilateral relations between the two countries.

== Commemorative events ==
=== San Francisco ===
SF logo

A plaque marking the 150th anniversary of the arrival of the Japanese ship Kanrin Maru was dedicated March 17, 2010 at Pier 9 on the Embarcadero in San Francisco. This ceremony was the first in a year-long series of commemorative events. The Asian Art Museum in San Francisco organized an exhibit in conjunction with the anniversary. The exhibit, "Japan’s Early Ambassadors to San Francisco, 1860–1927," ran from May through November 2010. Among the items displayed were gifts from the Japanese diplomatic mission and sketches of San Francisco drawn by one of the samurai of the delegation.

The Japanese Consulate sponsored a lecture by Prof. Naoyuki Agawa of Keio University about the Kanrin Maru, which was the first Japanese naval vessel to cross the Pacific Ocean. The ship transported the first Japanese diplomatic delegation, including Fukuzawa Yukichi, Katsu Kaishū, and Nakahama Manjirō. This was the first Japanese ship to enter the port of San Francisco.

=== Seattle ===
Five “Akebono” cherry trees were planted at Elliott Bay Park to commemorate the anniversary of the first official visit of Japanese diplomats in 1860.

=== Washington, D.C. ===
The Library of Congress organized a scholarly panel discussion about the 1860 Japanese diplomatic mission. Participants included Michael Auslin, Akira Iriye, Ronald Toby and the Japanese Ambassador to the U.S., Ichirō Fujisaki.

=== Philadelphia ===
When the Japanese diplomatic delegation visited Philadelphia in 1860, one of the highlights was a demonstration of the previously unknown Japanese version of chess or shogi. This is the first recorded game of shogi ever to be played outside Japan. In commemoration, shogi experts and representatives of the Philadelphia chess community, including former U.S. Champions in both shogi and chess, came together for a "chess event" at the Philadelphia Athenaeum.

=== New York ===
NYC logo

A parade of "samurai" was a modified reenactment in New York's Central Park to commemorate a procession up Broadway in New York City. The sesquicentennial parade recalled the procession of horse-drawn carriages bringing Japan's first diplomatic mission uptown from the Battery. In 1860, the route ended at a reviewing stand in Union Square where dignitaries were seated.

The Museum of the City of New York organized an exhibit, "Samurai in New York: The First Japanese Delegation, 1860," continuing from June through October. Rare 19th-century photographs and newspaper engravings document the two weeks. Also on display are a unique group of objects lent by Japanese institutions; and these both record and recall the experience in New York as it appeared from the Japanese viewpoint.

In partnership with the Weatherhead East Asian Institute at Columbia University, the Museum presented a lecture by Prof. Naoyuki Agawa, who discussed the significance of the 150th anniversary of the diplomatic mission. His special focus on the two weeks that the delegation visited New York.

The Empire State Building in New York City was lit up in red and white on Wednesday night, June 16, 2010. This marked the 150th anniversary of the arrival in the city of Japan's first diplomatic mission to the United States on June 16, 1860. The top part of the 443.2-meter skyscraper was lit up in the colors of the Japanese flag at sunset to celebrate the occasion.

== Bilateral relations ==
Events focusing on bilateral relations were encompassed conferences which brought together scholars, businessmen and policy-makers:

150 Years of Amity & 50 Years of Alliance

The Center for a New American Security (CNAS) organized a two-day conference, "150 Years of Amity & 50 Years of Alliance: Adopting an Enhanced Agenda for the U.S.-Japan Partnership." The conference was developed in partnership with the Nippon Foundation, the Sasakawa Peace Foundation, and the Ocean Policy Research Foundation. The meeting brings together leading American and Japanese policymakers and experts to discuss the military, economic, political, and strategic elements of the alliance. Featured speakers include:

- Richard Armitage, former Deputy Secretary of State and member of the CNAS Board of Directors
- Joseph Nye, University Distinguished Service Professor, Harvard University's Kennedy School of Government
- Patrick Cronin, Senior Advisor and Senior Director of the Asia Program, CNAS
- Robert Kaplan, Senior Fellow, CNAS
- Abraham Denmark, Fellow, CNAS
- Yoichi Funabashi, Editor-in-Chief, Asahi Shimbun
- Kazuya Sakamoto, Professor, Osaka University
- Michael Green, Senior Advisor and Japan Chair, CSIS
- Victor Cha, Senior Advisor and Korea Chair, CSIS
- G. John Ikenberry, Professor of Politics and International Affairs, Princeton University
- Yohei Sasakawa, Chairman of the Nippon Foundation
- Akira Iriye, Professor Emeritus at Harvard University
- Yukio Satoh, Vice Chairman, Japan Institute for International Affairs

Kanrin Maru Symposium

The Japan Society of Northern California and others sponsored the "Kanrin Maru Symposium: The Future of the US-Japan Relationship," in May 2010. Featured participants included:

- Joseph R. Donovan, Jr., Principal Deputy Assistant Secretary, Bureau of East Asian and Pacific Affairs, US Department of State
- Ambassador Michael Armacost, Shorenstein Distinguished Fellow, Shorenstein Asia-Pacific Research Center, Stanford University
- Dr. Carol Cherkis, President, BioInfoStrategies & Life Sciences Industry Consultant, NewCap Partners
- Dr. Richard B. Dasher, Director, US-Asia Technology Management Center, Stanford University
- Glen S. Fukushima, CEO, Airbus Japan & former President, American Chamber of Commerce in Japan
- Hideyuki Inoue, Founder & President, Social Venture Partners Tokyo
- Taro Kono, Member, House of Representatives, Liberal Democratic Party
- Allen Miner, Chairman & CEO, SunBridge Corporation
- Dr. Daniel Okimoto, Professor Emeritus of Political Science & Director Emeritus, Asia/Pacific Research Center, Stanford University
- Dr. Koji Osawa, Managing Principal & Co-founder, Global Catalyst Partners
- Benjamin Self, Takahashi Fellow, Shorenstein Asia-Pacific Research Center, Stanford University
- Yoichiro Taku, Partner, Wilson Sonsini Goodrich & Rosati
- Hitoshi Tanaka, former Deputy Minister of Foreign Affairs & Senior Fellow, Japan Center for International Exchange
- Dr. Steven K. Vogel, Professor of Political Science, University of California, Berkeley
