= Mikunoyoasobi =

EP by Ayase
- Released: January 6, 2021
- Genre: Vocaloid
- Length: 28:32
- Language: Japanese
- Label: Sony Japan
- Producer: Ayase

Ayase chronology
Ghost City Tokyo (2019)	Mikunoyoasobi (2021)	Dialogue (2026)

Mikunoyoasobi is the second EP by Japanese musician and record producer Ayase, originally released exclusively on CD to Tower Records Japan by Sony Music Entertainment Japan on January 6, 2021. Subsequently, the EP was available on streaming platforms on September 21, 2023, two years and eight months after its original release.

Mikunoyoasobi contains cover versions of seven tracks from Yoasobi's debut EP The Book recorded by Vocaloid software voicebank Hatsune Miku, including "Yoru ni Kakeru", which originally appears on the CD version of Ayase's debut EP Ghost City Tokyo.

== Track listing ==
All tracks are written by Ayase.

Mikunoyoasobi track listing
No.	Title	Length
1.	"Yoru ni Kakeru" (夜に駆ける)	4:20
2.	"Ano Yume o Nazotte" (あの夢をなぞって)	4:00
3.	"Halzion" (ハルジオン)	3:17
4.	"Tabun" (たぶん)	4:17
5.	"Gunjō" (群青)	4:05
6.	"Haruka" (ハルカ)	4:02
7.	"Encore" (アンコール)	4:31
Total length:		28:32

Notes

- All tracks are noted as "Hatsune Miku version" (Japanese: 初音ミクVer.)

== Charts ==
2021 chart performance for Mikunoyoasobi
Chart (2021)	Peak position
Japanese Albums (Oricon)	15
Japanese Combined Albums (Oricon)	24
Japanese Hot Albums (Billboard Japan)	18

2023 chart performance for Mikunoyoasobi
Chart (2023)	Peak position
Japanese Digital Albums (Oricon)	23
Japanese Hot Albums (Billboard Japan)	82

== Sales ==
Sales figures for Mikunoyoasobi
Region	Certification	Certified units/sales
Japan Physical	—	3,738
Japan Digital	—	178

== Release history ==
Release dates and formats for Mikunoyoasobi
Region	Date	Format	Label	Ref.
Japan	January 6, 2021	CD	Sony Japan	
Various	September 21, 2023	Digital download; streaming	Sony Japan	
