= Chiyo Uno =

Japanese writer (1897–1996)

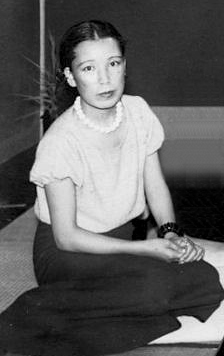
- Born: November 28, 1897; Iwakuni, Japan
- Died: June 10, 1996 (aged 98); Tokyo, Japan
- Occupations: Writer, magazine editor, kimono designer
- Writing career
- Notable works: Ohan, Confessions of Love

Chiyo Uno (Japanese: 宇野 千代, Hepburn: Uno Chiyo; November 28, 1897–June 10, 1996) was a Japanese author and kimono designer, known for her contributions to Japanese fashion, film, and literature.

== Early years ==
Uno was born in Iwakuni, Yamaguchi. In 1915, she was fired from her job as a teacher's assistant for having an affair with a colleague. In 1919, she married her cousin, a banker named Fujimara Tadashi. Her initial literary success came in 1921 when she was awarded a prize for her short story Shifun no Kao, or Painted Face. After receiving the award, Uno left Tadashi and moved to Tokyo.

During the 1920s, Uno was influenced by American and European cultures, reflecting the broader fascination with Western styles among Japanese youth of the time. In 1927, she became one of the first women in Japan to adopt the bobbed hairstyle popularized by flappers. Embracing a free-spirited lifestyle, Uno sought to embody the "modern girl" (moga) distancing herself from traditional roles. She became involved in Tokyo's Bohemian circles, forming relationships with writers, poets, and painters.

== Career ==
In 1933, Uno began publishing the serialized novel Confessions of Love (色ざんげ, Iro zange). The best seller brought her much fame. The novel details an artist and his various love affairs, and a suicide attempt with his mistress. The novel was based on the biography of Seiji Tōgō, an artist with whom Uno had a romantic relationship. Uno's Confessions of Love was applauded for her ability to write from the perspective of a man, which further added to the book's appeal.

Shortly after the success of Confessions of Love, Uno started a magazine called Sutairu (スタイル), or Style, in 1936. The magazine was the first in Japan to focus on foreign fashion. Sutairu took up much of Uno's time through the following decades until its bankruptcy in 1959.

Uno continued to write for an audience of Japanese women, who found a sense of liberation in Uno's prose. Even if Uno's readers remained within conventional boundaries themselves, they could escape briefly through her stories of lovers and entanglements. Throughout her literary career, she received praise for her ability to write from both male and female perspectives.

Uno later became a successful kimono designer, and, with her assistant designer Tomiyo Hanazawa, staged the first kimono fashion show in the United States in 1957.

== Later years ==
Uno was recognized by the Emperor and assumed the honor of being one of Japan's oldest and most talented female writers. In 1983 she published the memoir I Will Go On Living (Ikite yuku watakushi), which was widely read and adapted for television. She was named a Person of Cultural Merit in 1990.

She died in 1996 at the age of 98 due to pneumonia.

== Works ==
- Confessions of Love, 1933–1935
- Ningyoshi Tenguya Kyukichi (The Puppet Master Tenguya Kyukichi), 1942
- Ohan, 1957
- Sasu (To Sting), 1964
- Kaze no Oto (The Sound of the Wind), 1969
- Kofuku (Blessings), 1970
- The Story of a Single Woman, 1972
- Mama no Hanashi (Mama-san's Story), 1976
- Cherī ga Shinda (Cherry is Dead), 1976
- I Will Go On Living, 1983
- Ippen Harukaze ga Fuitekita (Suddenly a Spring Wind), 1987

== Awards and honours ==
- 1957, Noma Literary Prize
