= Mizuki Tsujimura =

Japanese writer

- 辻村深月
- Born: February 29, 1980 (age 46); Fuefuki, Yamanashi, Japan
- Education: Chiba University
- Occupation: Novelist
- Writing career
- Language: Japanese
- Genres: Fiction, mystery fiction children's literature
- Notable works: Kagi no nai yume wo miru (鍵のない夢を見る); A School Frozen in Time (冷たい校舎の時は止まる, Tsumetai Kōsha no Toki wa Tomaru); Tsunagi (ツナグ)
- Notable awards: Naoki Prize; Mephisto Prize; Yoshikawa Eiji Prize for New Writers

Mizuki Tsujimura (辻村深月, Tsujimura Mizuki) (born February 29, 1980) is a Japanese writer from Fuefuki, Yamanashi.

Tsujimura specializes in mystery novels. She writes both for adults and children.

She has been writing mystery novels since she was a high school student. She decided to go to Chiba University because there was a mystery research group in this university. She made her debut in 2004 with her novel A School Frozen in Time.

She professes herself to be a fan of Doraemon and wrote the screenplay for the Doraemon movie, Doraemon: Nobita's Chronicle of the Moon Exploration and its novel version in 2018.

== Awards ==
After being shortlisted several times for the Naoki Prize, she finally received the 2012 Naoki Prize for Kagi no nai Yume wo Miru (I Saw a Dream Without a Key)

Tsujimura won the 2018 Japan Booksellers' Award for her novel Lonely Castle in the Mirror.

== Bibliography ==
Year	Title	Publisher	Ref.
2004	A School Frozen in Time	Kodansha	
2005	Kodomo Tachi ha Yoru ni Asobu	Kodansha	
2005	Koori no Kujira	Kodansha	
2006	Boku no major-spoon	Kodansha	
2007	Surouhaitsu no Kamisama	Kodansha	
2007	Namae Sagasi no Houkago	Kodansha	
2009	0, 8, 0, 7	Kodansha	
2010	Shima ha Bokurato	Kodansha	
2010	Lost Souls Meet Under a Full Moon	Shinchosha	
2011	Order-made Satsujin Club	Shueisha	
2012	Kagi no nai yume wo miru	Bungeishunjū	
2014	Anime Supremacy!	Magazine House	
2015	Asa ga Kuru	Bungeishunjū	
2017	Lonely Castle in the Mirror	Poplar Publishing	
2019	How to Hold Someone In Your Heart	Shinchosha	
2019	Doraemon: Nobita's Chronicle of the Moon Exploration	Shougakukan	
2021	Yami-hara	Kadokawa	
2022	Hajimete no ("Yūrei")	Suirinsha	
2022	Arrogance and Virtue	Asahi Bunko	
2023	Catching the Stars of This Summer	Kadokawa	
