= Eto Mori =

Japanese novelist

Eto Mori (Japanese: 森絵都, romanized: Mori Eto, born 1968) is a Japanese novelist focusing on children's and young adult literature. She has been described as "one of the most celebrated female writers of fiction in Japan today".

Mori was born in Tokyo, and graduated from the Japan Juvenile Education College and Waseda University. She released her debut novel, Rizumu (Rhythm), in 1990, winning the Kodansha Award of Children's Literature for Newcomers. Her other works include Uchu no minashigo (Slight Light Little Star or Orphans of the Universe, 1994, winner of the Noma Literary Prize New Author Award), Tsuki no fune (Moon Ship, 1998, winner of the Noma Literary Prize), and Kazeni maiagaru biniru shito (Plastic Sheet Soaring in the Wind, 2006, winner of the Naoki Prize). Her 1998 novel Karafuru (Colorful, winner of the Sankei Children's Book Award) has been adapted into three films (including Shun Nakahara's Colorful, the 2010 animated Colorful and the 2018 Thai adaptation Homestay). Her four-volume series Daibu!! (Dive!!, 2000–2002, winner of the Shogakukan Award for Children's Literature) has been adapted into a manga series, a feature film and an anime television series.

== Bibliography ==
=== Contributions ===
- Hajimete no (はじめての) ("Hikari no Tane"), Suirinsha, 2022, ISBN 978-4-16-401004-4

=== Translated works ===
- Karafuru (カラフル), 1998 (English translation: Colorful, Counterpoint Press, 2021)
