= Rio Shimamoto =

Japanese writer

- 島本 理生
- Born: 1983 (age 42–43); Tokyo, Japan
- Occupation: Writer
- Writing career
- Language: Japanese
- Genre: Fiction
- Notable works: First Love; Little by Little; Silhouette
- Notable awards: Naoki Prize; Noma Literary New Face Prize; Gunzo Prize for New Writers
- Website: shimamotorio.com

Rio Shimamoto (島本 理生, Shimamoto Rio) is a Japanese writer. She has won the Gunzo Prize for New Writers, the Noma Literary New Face Prize and the Naoki Prize, and her work has been adapted for film.

== Biography ==
Shimamoto was born in 1983 in Tokyo, Japan. She made her literary debut in 2001 with her story Shiruetto (Silhouette) while still a student at Tokyo Metropolitan Shinjuku Yamabuki Senior High School, winning the 44th Gunzo Prize for New Writers. Her 2002 novella Little by Little won the 25th Noma Literary New Face Prize and was nominated for an Akutagawa Prize, but did not win. Shimamoto was the youngest person to receive the Noma Literary New Face Prize in its history.

In 2005 her novel Narratage was published and became a bestseller in Japan. A year later, Shimamoto dropped out of Rikkyo University to pursue her writing full-time. After being nominated for the Akutagawa Prize four times and the Naoki Prize twice, Shimamoto won the 159th Naoki Prize for her 2018 book First Love. The Naoki Prize committee members were not unanimous in their decision, but finally selected Shimamoto's work after multiple rounds of voting.

Shimamoto's novel Narratage was adapted by director Isao Yukisada into a 2017 film of the same name starring Kasumi Arimura and Jun Matsumoto. Her 2013 novel Yodaka no Kataomoi (lit. The Nighthawk's Unrequited Love), a story about a woman named Aiko, born with a large blue birthmark on her face, who navigates prejudice as she seeks love, was adapted by director Yūka Yasukawa into a 2022 film of the same name starring Rena Matsui as Aiko.

Shimamoto has cited Shuji Terayama as a literary influence.

== Personal life ==
Shimamoto is married to Japanese novelist Yuya Sato.

== Awards and honors ==
- 2001 44th Gunzo Prize for New Writers
- 2003 25th Noma Literary New Face Prize
- 2018 159th Naoki Prize (2018上)

== Works ==
- Shiruetto (Silhouette), Kodansha, 2001, ISBN 9784062109048
- Ritoru bai ritoru (Little by Little), Kodansha, 2003, ISBN 9784062116695
- Umareru mori, Kodansha, 2004, ISBN 9784062122061
- Issen ichibyō no hibi, Magajin Hausu, 2005, ISBN 9784838715923
- Naratāju (Narratage), Kadokawa Shoten, 2005, ISBN 9784048735902
- Kurōbā, Kadokawa Shoten, 2007, ISBN 9784048738170
- Anata no kokyū ga tomaru made, Shinchosha, 2007, ISBN 9784103020325
- Namiuchigiwa no hotaru, Kadokawa Shoten, 2008, ISBN 9784048738736
- Chica raifu (Chica Life), Kodansha, 2008, ISBN 9784062147941
- Kimi ga furu hi, Gentosha, 2009, ISBN 9784344016569
- Arare mo nai inori, Kawade Shobō Shinsha, 2010, ISBN 9784309019819
- Mawatasō no jūnintachi, Bungeishunjū, 2010, ISBN 9784163289403
- Andastuando meibī (Understand, Maybe), Chūō Kōron Shinsha, 2010, ISBN 9784120041679
- Ōkina kuma ga kuru mae ni oyasumi, Shinchosha, 2010, ISBN 9784101314815
- Nanao no tame ni, Kodansha, 2012, ISBN 9784062179829
- Bīkyū ren'ai gurume no susume, Kadokawa Shoten, 2013, ISBN 9784041103470
- Yodaka no kataomoi, Shueisha, 2013, ISBN 9784087715071
- Shūmatsu wa kanojotachi no mono, Gentosha, 2013, ISBN 9784344420649
- Reddo (Red), Chūō Kōron Shinsha, 2014, ISBN 9784120046544
- Tokumeisha no tame no Supika, Shōdensha, 2015, ISBN 9784396634728
- Inosento (Innocent), Shueisha, 2016, ISBN 9784087716566
- Watashitachi wa gin no fōku to kusuri o te ni shite, Gentosha, 2017, ISBN 9784344031234
- Natsu no saidan, Bungeishunjū, 2018, ISBN 9784167911003
- Fāsuto rabu (First Love), Bungeishunjū, 2018, ISBN 9784163908410
- Hajimete no ("Watashi Dake no Shoyūsha"), Suirinsha, 2022, ISBN 9784164010044
