= Ayase (music producer) =

Japanese musician and record producer (born 1994)

- Ayase in 2026
- Born: April 4, 1994 (age 32); Ube, Yamaguchi, Japan
- Other name: Keiichirō
- Occupations: Musician; singer; songwriter; record producer
- Agents: Echoes; Creative Artists Agency
- Musical career
- Origin: Japan
- Genres: J-pop; Vocaloid; doujin; rock
- Instruments: Keyboards; sampler; cajón; vocals
- Years active: 2012–present
- Labels: Sony Japan; Echoes
- Member of: Yoasobi; Dreamers
- Formerly of: Davinci

Ayase (born April 4, 1994) is a Japanese musician, singer, songwriter, and record producer. His musical career began in 2012 as a vocalist for the rock band Davinci, which disbanded in 2020, before transitioning to the Vocaloid scene and releasing his first two EPs, Ghost City Tokyo (2019) and Mikunoyoasobi (2021), featuring Vocaloid voicebank Hatsune Miku. He is best known as a member of Yoasobi, a musical duo in which he serves as songwriter and vocalist Ikura. In 2026, Ayase released his third EP, Dialogue, which featured his own vocals.

== Early life ==
Ayase was born on April 4, 1994, in Ube, Yamaguchi Prefecture, Japan. When he was around 3 or 4 years old, he received his first piano lessons from his grandmother, who was a music teacher. When he started elementary school, he received professional piano lessons at a music school. In later grade school, he also learned to play acoustic guitar after receiving one as a Christmas present. The first song he learned to play on guitar was originally written by Ringo Sheena.

Boy band Exile inspired Ayase to pursue a musical career. His musical influences include Sukima Switch, Kobukuro, Radwimps, Aiko, Post Malone, Yumi Matsutoya, Mariya Takeuchi, and Toshinobu Kubota. He also stated that he was influenced by several rock and metal bands, such as Maximum the Hormone, Coldrain, Crossfaith, SiM, Slipknot and Bring Me the Horizon before he found the band. His music genre influences include '80s and '90s music, K-pop, J-pop, and folk music.

== Career ==
=== 2012–2020: Davinci ===
In 2012, at age 18, Ayase formed the rock band Davinci with classmates from high school, performing as Keiichirō, and he served as both vocalist and leader. Due to his band activity, he later dropped out of high school, and in 2016, the band relocated to Tokyo. In October 2018, the band went on hiatus due to Ayase's medical treatment for peptic ulcer disease. Eventually, the band announced their disbandment two years later, in July 2020.

=== 2018–2022: Vocaloid scene and Yoasobi ===
During Davinci's hiatus, Ayase started making music using the Vocaloid software voicebank Hatsune Miku during treatment at the hospital. He released his first song, "Sentensei Assault Girl", via the video-sharing website YouTube and Niconico on December 24, 2018. Following this, he continued to self-publish several songs, including "Last Resort" in April 2019, which was his first song to gain popularity. Eventually, Ayase released his debut extended play Ghost City Tokyo, recorded by Hatsune Miku vocals, on November 17, 2019.

Around the time "Last Resort" became popular, in mid 2019, Ayase received an offer from Sony Music Entertainment Japan's Yohei Yashiro and Shuya Yamamoto, to collaborate on a project to produce songs inspired by short stories published on creative writing social media Monogatary.com. He found Ikura on Instagram, where she covered the song, and later checked her YouTube channel, and contacted her directly to persuade her to form the duo, called Yoasobi. Their debut single "Yoru ni Kakeru", which was released in December 2019, went viral and became a musical success in Japan, which resulted in Yoasobi increasing in popularity in the Japanese music scene.

In 2020, Ayase wrote and produced the song "Saikai", performed by singers Lisa and Uru, to promote Sony noise-cancelling headphones. His second EP Mikunoyoasobi was released exclusively on CD to Tower Records Japan on January 6, 2021. The EP contains cover versions by Hatsune Miku of seven tracks from Yoasobi's debut EP The Book, including "Yoru ni Kakeru", which previously appeared on Ghost City Tokyo. Ayase's self-cover of two tracks from Ghost City Tokyo, "Yoru Naderu Menō" and "Yūrei Tōkyō", were released to streaming platforms on September 8, 2021, after previously being published on YouTube and Niconico during 2019 to 2020. He collaborated with Creepy Nuts and Lilas Ikuta on the single "Baka Majime", which featured on All Night Nippon 55th-anniversary stage drama Ano Yoru o Oboe Teru.

=== 2022–present: Non-Vocaloid music and Dialogue ===
Ayase released his first non-Vocaloid single, "Hōwa", alongside a self-cover of "Cinema", on September 30, 2022. In 2023, he recorded two anime opening themes: "Shock!" for Buddy Daddies, and "Hiten" with R-Shitei for the 2023 edition of Rurouni Kenshin. Ayase and Vocaloid producers Syudou, Surii, and Tsumiki collaborated for the EP Ryūgūjō, as Dreamers; Ayase wrote the song "Kira Kira Kira". It was released exclusively at the Creators Market of Hatsune Miku: Magical Mirai 2023 festival in Osaka on August 11. In 2024, Ayase wrote and performed the song "From Now!", which was also co-composed and arranged by Yasutaka Nakata, and was released on September 6. It was used for limited event quests and commercials for the mobile game Monster Hunter Now. He was in charge of writing and producing the theme song for the 2024 medical film Doctor-X: The Movie, titled "Episode X", which was performed by Ado.

Ayase released his third EP, Dialogue, the first album outside the Vocaloid scene, on May 27, 2026. It was preceded by the lead single, "Urusa", a week earlier.

== Personal life ==
Ayase has several tattoos, including the one that peeks out from his neck. He has been dating Nina Ai, who works on some of Yoasobi's cover artworks and music videos, including "Yoru ni Kakeru".

== Discography ==
=== Extended plays ===
List of extended plays, with selected details, chart positions and sales
Title	Details	Peak positions			Sales
Title	Details	JPN	JPN Cmb.	JPN Hot	Sales
Ghost City Tokyo	Released: November 17, 2019; Label: Self-release; Formats: CD, DL, streaming; Track listing: 1. "Happy Ender" (ハッピーエンダー); 2. "Fiction Blue" (フィクションブルー); 3. "Last Resort" (ラストリゾート); 4. "Killer Queen" (キラークイーン); 5. "Violeta" (ヴァイオレッタ); 6. "Ghost City Tokyo" (幽霊東京); 7. "Yoru ni Kakeru" (夜に駆ける; Hatsune Miku version; CD only); 8. "Yoru Naderu Menō" (夜撫でるメノウ; Ayase version; CD only)	—	—	—	
Mikunoyoasobi	Released: January 6, 2021; Label: Sony Japan; Formats: CD, DL, streaming	15	24	18	JPN: 3,916 (Note: Japan physical and digital combined sale figures for Mikunoyoasobi)
Dialogue	Released: May 27, 2026; Label: Echoes, Sony Japan; Formats: LP, DL, streaming	—	—	—	JPN: 333
"—" denotes releases that did not chart or were not released in that region.

=== Singles ===
List of singles, with selected chart positions, showing year released, certifications and album name
Title	Year	Peak chart positions			Certifications	Album
Title	Year	JPN	JPN Cmb.	JPN Hot	Certifications	Album
"Suima" (with Kankan)	2021	—	—	—		Non-album single
"Yoru Naderu Menō" (Note: "Yoru Naderu Menō" was first voiced by Hatsune Miku and was non-commercially published through YouTube and Niconico in early 2019. A self-cover of the song was commercially released on the EP Ghost City Tokyo in December 2019. The same self-cover was re-released in 2021, alongside "Yūrei Tōkyō".)	2021	—	24	25	RIAJ: Platinum (st.)	Ghost City Tokyo
"Yūrei Tōkyō"	2021	—	24	—		Non-album single
"Baka Majime" (with Creepy Nuts and Lilas Ikuta)	2022	—	50	38	RIAJ: Platinum (st.)	Ensemble Play
"Hōwa"	2022	—	—	—		Non-album singles
"Cinema"	2022	—	—	—		Non-album singles
"Shock!"	2023	—	—	—		Non-album singles
"Hiten" (with R-Shitei)	2023	38	—	73		Non-album singles
"Kira Kira Kira" (as Dreamers)	2023	—	—	—		Ryūgūjō
"From Now!"	2024	—	—	—		Non-album single
"Urusa"	2026	—	—	—		Dialogue
"—" denotes releases that did not chart or were not released in that region.

=== Non-commercial releases ===
List of non-commercial songs, showing title, year released, vocalist, and album
Title	Year	Vocalist(s)	Album
"Sentensei Assault Girl"	2018	Hatsune Miku	Non-album songs
"I'm Not Crying"	2019	Hatsune Miku	Non-album songs
"Happy Ender"	2019	Hatsune Miku	Ghost City Tokyo
"Yoru Naderu Menō"	2019	Hatsune Miku	Non-album songs
"Last Resort"	2019	Hatsune Miku	Ghost City Tokyo
"Pseudohumans"	2019	V Flower and Hatsune Miku	Non-album songs
"Killer Queen"	2019	Hatsune Miku	Ghost City Tokyo
"Fiction Blue"	2019	Hatsune Miku	Ghost City Tokyo
"Cynical Night Plan"	2020	Hatsune Miku	Non-album songs
"Yokubari"	2020	Hatsune Miku	Non-album songs
"Bitter Sweet Samba" (Ayase remix)	2021	—N/a	Non-album songs

=== Guest appearances ===
List of non-single guest appearances, showing title, year released, and album name
Title	Year	Album
"Tachiiri Kinshi" (with Ado)	2022	Mafumafu Tribute Album – Tensei
"Hero" (featuring Hatsune Miku)	2023	Magical Mirai 2023: Official Album

=== Songwriting and production credits ===
All song credits are adapted from the Japanese Society for Rights of Authors, Composers and Publishers's database unless stated otherwise.

List of songs written by Ayase for other artists, showing year released, artist name, and name of the album
Song	Year	Artist	Album	Lyricist	Composer	Arranger
"Evergreen"	2019	Ryushen	Non-album single	Yes	Yes	Yes
"Inochi ga Naite Itanda"	2020	The Binary	Jiu	Yes	Yes	Yes
"Wanderer"	2020	Satomi	Never End	Yes	Yes	Yes
"Saikai"	2020	Lisa, Uru	Non-album single	Yes	Yes	Yes
"Sen'ya Ichiya"	2020	Hey! Say! JUMP	Fab!: Music Speaks	Yes	Yes	Yes
"Shout!"	2020	TTJ	Non-album single	Yes	Yes	Yes
"Snow Dance"	2021	Genin wa Jibun ni Aru	Multiverse	Yes	Yes	Yes
"Never Ending"	2021	Shoose	Velvet Night	Yes	Yes	No
"Shinkai"	2021	Nana Mori	Album	Yes	Yes	Yes
"Yuke"	2021	Lisa	Lander	No	Yes	No
"Alter Garden"	2021	Regret (Arisa Kōri)	Caligula 2 Original Soundtrack	Yes	Yes	No
"Cinema"	2021	Vivid Bad Squad	"Rad Dogs" / "Cinema"	Yes	Yes	No
"Introduction"	2022	Poppin'Party	"Poppin'Dream"	Yes	Yes	Yes
"Kaimaku Zenoparade"	2022	Varis	Kakusei Historia	Yes	Yes	Yes
"Wonder Light"	2022	Idolish7	Leading Tone	No	Yes	Yes
"Michizure"	2023	Hoshimachi Suisei	Specter	Yes	Yes	Yes
"Datsu Karitekita Neko Shōkōgun"	2023	Uru	Contrast	No	Yes	No
"Michishirube"	2023	Masayuki Suzuki	Soul Navigation	Yes	Yes	No
"Four-Man Cell"	2023	Top 4 (Kiyo, Retort, Ushizawa, Gatchman)	Non-album single	Yes	Yes	No
"Episode X"	2024	Ado	Ado's Best Adobum	Yes	Yes	Yes
"Ōdō"	2026	Kuzuha	Adamantite	Yes	Yes	Yes

== Filmography ==
=== Film ===
Title	Year	Role	Note	Ref.
Yoasobi 5th Anniversary Dome Live 2024 "Surrealism"	2025	Himself	Concert film	

== Awards and nominations ==
Name of the award ceremony, year presented, award category, nominee(s) of the award, and the result of the nomination
Award ceremony	Year	Category	Nominee(s)/work(s)	Result	Ref.
Japan Record Awards	2023	Best Composition Award	"Idol"	Won	
JASRAC Awards	2023	Silver Prize	"Yoru ni Kakeru"	Won	
JASRAC Awards	2024	Gold Prize	"Idol"	Won	
JASRAC Awards	2025	Gold Prize	"Idol"	Won	
Music Awards Japan	2025	Song of the Year for Creators	"Idol"	Won	
