= 火車 =

The word 火車 literally means "fire cart", "fire chariot", or "fire vehicle" in Chinese, Korean and Japanese, and may refer to:

In Chinese:

- East Rail line, a rapid transit line in Hong Kong previously known as 火車
- Train, a rail-based vehicle
- Steam locomotive

In Korean:

- Hwacha, a multiple rocket launcher
- Helpless (2012 film), South Korean film originally released as Hwacha (화차; 火車)

In Japanese:

- Kasha (folklore), a yōkai in Japanese folklore
- All She Was Worth, Japanese crime novel originally released as Kasha (火車)
