= Kaze o Atsumete =

Kaze o Atsumete (風をあつめて, lit. "gather the wind") may refer to:

- "Kaze wo Atsumete", a 1971 song by Happy End from their album Kazemachi Roman
- Kaze o Atsumete (Aqua Timez album), a 2006 album by Aqua Timez
