= List of Brave Story chapters =

The cover of Brave Story volume 1 as released by Shinchosha on April 9, 2004 in Japan.

The chapters of Brave Story manga are written and illustrated by Yoichiro Ono. It was inspired by the novel's winning of the Batchelder Award. The manga serialization in Shinchosha's Weekly Comic Bunch ended on March 14, 2008. The individual chapters were published into 20 tankōbon volumes, which were released between April 9, 2004, and May 9, 2008. The manga is licensed and published in English by Tokyopop. It is also licensed in France by Kurokawa.

== Volume list ==
No.	Original release date	Original ISBN	English release date	English ISBN
1	April 9, 2004	978-4-10-771141-0	June 12, 2007	978-1-4278-0489-1
1. "Haunted Building" (お化け屋敷, "Obake Yashiki"); 2. "Eligibility" (資格, "Shikaku"); 3. "Vision" (幻視, "Genshi"); 4. "Difficult Reality" (厳しい現実, "Kibishii Genjitsu"); 5. "Confession" (告白, "Kokuhaku"); 6. "Solitude" (孤独, "Kodoku"); 7. "Secret" (秘密, "Himitsu"); 8. "Reason" (理由, "Riyū")
2	April 9, 2004	978-4-10-771142-7	October 9, 2007	978-1-4278-0490-7
9. "To Vision" (ビジョンへ, "Bijon He"); 10. "Traveler" (トラベラー, "Toraberā"); 11. "The Third Traveler" (3番目の旅行者, "San Banme no Ryokō Sha"); 12. "The Clown's True Power" (の男の真のパワー, "No Otoko no Shin no Pawā"); 13. "Awakening" (目覚め, "Mezame"); 14. "Forfeiture" (没収, "Bosshū"); 15. "Promise" (約束, "Yakusoku"); 16. "Journey Begun" (旅行開始, "Ryokō Kaishi"); 17. "Water People" (水と人, "Mizu to Hito"); 18. "The Branch" (の支店, "No Shiten")
3	June 9, 2004	978-4-10-771152-6	February 5, 2008	978-1-4278-0491-4
19. "Intruder" (侵入者, "Shinnyū Sha"); 20. "Dispute" (紛争, "Funsō"); 21. "Execution" (実行, "Jikkō"); 22. "Kaori's Decision" (かおりの決定, "Kaori No Kettei"); 23. "Spell of Breaking" (スペル破壊, "Superu Hakai"); 24. "Soul of the Fire Dragon" (ソウルは火のドラゴン, "Souru Ha Hi no Doragon"); 25. "Secret Plans" (秘密の計画, "Himitsu no Keikaku"); 26. "The Strong of Spirit" (心の強い, "Kokoro no Tsuyoi"); 27. "The Sad Traveler" (悲しきトラベラー, "Kanashiki Toraberā"); 28. "The Shigdra" (のShigdra, "No Shigdra")
4	September 9, 2004	978-4-10-771170-0	May 6, 2008	978-1-4278-0492-1
29. "Ashikawa of the Shigdra" (芦川のShigdraの, "Ashikawa no Shigdra no"); 30. "The Five Orbs" (5つのオーブ, "Go Tsu no Ōbu"); 31. "The Mirror of Enternal Darkness" (鏡のEnternalの闇, "Kagami no Enternal no Yami"); 32. "Not Alone" (だけ, "Dake"); 33. "The Unluckiest Assassin" (のUnluckiestアサシン, "No Unluckiest Asashin"); 34. "The Act" (法律, "Houritsu"); 35. "The Girl Who Hungered for Love" (少女は誰Hungered愛, "Shōjo Ha Dare Hungered Ai"); 36. "Beserker"; 37. "Answer" (答え, "Kotae"); 38. "Demon" (悪魔, "Akuma")
5	December 9, 2004	978-4-10-771188-5	August 5, 2008	978-1-4278-0493-8
6	March 9, 2005	978-4-10-771205-9	November 4, 2008	978-1-4278-0494-5
7	May 9, 2005	978-4-10-771214-1	—	—
8	August 9, 2005	978-4-10-771230-1	—	—
9	October 9, 2005	978-4-10-771240-0	—	—
10	December 9, 2005	978-4-10-771250-9	—	—
11	March 9, 2006	978-4-10-771266-0	—	—
12	June 9, 2006	978-4-10-771276-9	—	—
13	August 9, 2006	978-4-10-771287-5	—	—
14	November 9, 2006	978-4-10-771301-8	—	—
15	March 9, 2007	978-4-10-771323-0	—	—
16	June 8, 2007	978-4-10-771341-4	—	—
17	August 9, 2007	978-4-10-771349-0	—	—
18	November 9, 2007	978-4-10-771366-7	—	—
19	March 8, 2008	978-4-10-771388-9	—	—
20	May 9, 2008	978-4-10-771396-4	—	—
