= Brave Story: New Traveler =

2006 video game

- Developer: Game Republic (Note: Additional work by Sony Computer Entertainment Japan.)
- Publishers: JP: Sony Computer Entertainment; NA: Xseed Games
- Directors: Yoshiki Okamoto; Yoshinori Takenaka
- Writers: Tadashi Satomi; Hideyuki Ishizeki
- Composers: Manase Kawasaki; Minako Seki
- Platform: PlayStation Portable
- Release: AS: July 4, 2006; JP: July 6, 2006; NA: July 31, 2007
- Genre: Role-playing
- Mode: Single-player

Brave Story: New Traveler (Note: Japanese: ブレイブ・ストーリー 新たなる旅人, Hepburn: Bureibu Stōrī: Aratanaru Tabibito) is a role-playing video game developed by Game Republic and published by Sony Computer Entertainment for the PlayStation Portable. It is based on the manga adaptation of Brave Story. It was released in Asia on July 4, 2006, and in Japan two days later. An English version, published and localized by Xseed Games, was released on July 31, 2007, in North America.

== Plot summary ==
The game starts off with the player as the main protagonist, called Tatsuya as the default name, and introduces us to his best friend, whose default name is Miki. The story kicks off with Tatsuya and Miki sitting on a bench. Tatsuya is too immersed in the game he is playing on his PSP to notice that Miki is missing. Kratos, Miki's dog, barks and shows Tatsuya where Miki is and thus he finds her unconscious on the ground, sick by some unknown illness. He wishes for her to become better, and suddenly, a voice magically appears and asks Tatsuya if he wants to save his friend and make her healthy again. He agrees and thus the adventure begins in an unknown land separated from the rest of the world. He must seize five special gems for the Traveler's Sword he holds so he can return to his own world and restore Miki back to good health.

The game is based on the Japanese novel Brave Story by Miyuki Miyabe, and features some of the original cast, although the main characters Tatsuya and Miki (as well as most of Tatsuya's party) are original creations for the game.

== Gameplay ==
After beating the game and watching the credits, the player can save over their current playthrough. The new file is marked with a star and is entitled "Epilogue". Resuming the game from the star-marked file allows the player to continue the game from the last save point but with access to the new Roster feature under Settings. Roster allows the player to place the guest characters Wataru, Meena, Kee Keema, Mitsuru and Kutz into their party any time they please; the guest characters are now at Level 60+ and have new equipment and abilities. There will also be an extra part of the game to complete, The Earthrift.

== Reception ==
Reception

Aggregate score
Aggregator	Score
Metacritic	76/100

Review scores
Publication	Score
1Up.com	A
Destructoid	5/10
Famitsu	33/40
Game Informer	7.25/10
GameSpot	6.5/10
GameSpy	4/5
GameZone	8.2/10
Hardcore Gamer	3.75/5
IGN	7.3/10
PlayStation: The Official Magazine	7.5/10
RPGamer	4/5
RPGFan	86%
X-Play	3/5

Brave Story: New Traveler received "favorable" reviews according to video game review aggregator Metacritic. In Japan, Famitsu gave it a score of three eights and one nine for a total of 33 out of 40. GamePro said of the game, "It definitely won't be the RPG to own for the PSP, but it will serve up a nice, albeit well-trodden, fantasy world to romp around in for a while." (Note: GamePro gave the game 4.5/5 for graphics, two 4/5 scores for sound and fun factor, and 3.75/5 for control.)
