= Kaze o Atsumete (Aqua Timez album) =

Kaze wo Atsumete

Studio album by Aqua Timez
- Released: December 6, 2006
- Genre: Rock, J-pop
- Label: Sony Music Japan

Aqua Timez chronology
Kaze wo Atsumete (2006)	Dareka no Chijōe (2007)

Singles from Kaze o Atsumete
- 1. "Ketsui no Asa ni" Released: July 5, 2006; 2. "Sen no Yoru o Koete" Released: November 22, 2006

Kaze o Atsumete (風をあつめて; "Gather the Wind") is the debut studio album by Japanese rock band Aqua Timez released on December 6, 2006. It reached number 6 on the Oricon Albums Chart.

Aqua Timez's first single, "Ketsui no Asa ni", is featured in the film Brave Story, and their second single, "Sen no Yoru o Koete," is the theme song from the Bleach film Bleach: Memories of Nobody.

== Track listing ==
1. "1mm"
2. "Hoshi no Mienai Yoru (星の見えない夜; Starless Night)"
3. "No Rain, No Rainbow"
4. "Ketsui no Asa ni (決意の朝に; In the Morning of Decision)"
5. "Hachimitsu (Daddy, Daddy) (ハチミツ～Daddy, Daddy～; Honey (Daddy, Daddy))"
6. "Sen no Yoru wo Koete (千の夜を越えて; Pass a Thousand Nights)"
7. "Green-bird"
8. "Ayumi (歩み; Walking)"
9. "Mastermind (マスターマインド; Masutāmaindo)"
10. "White Hall (ホワイトホール; Howaito Hōru)"
11. "Present (プレゼント; Purezento)"
12. "Perfect World"
13. "Itsumo Issho (いつもいっしょ; Always Together)"
14. "Shiroi Mori (白い森; White Forest)"
