= Pyrokinesis (film) =

2000 film by Shūsuke Kaneko

- Japanese film poster
- Directed by: Shusuke Kaneko
- Screenplay by: Kodai Yamada; Masahiro Yokotani; Shusuke Kaneko
- Based on: Crossfire and Hatobuki Grass by Miyuki Miyabe
- Produced by: Kazuhiko Seda; Hideyuki Honma; Kazuya Hamana; Setsuro Tagami
- Starring: Akiko Yada; Hideaki Itō; Masami Nagasawa; Hidenori Tokuyama
- Cinematography: Kenji Takama
- Edited by: Isao Tomita
- Music by: Kow Otani
- Production companies: Toho Pictures; Tokyo Broadcasting System
- Distributed by: Toho
- Release date: June 10, 2000 (Japan)
- Running time: 115 minutes
- Country: Japan
- Language: Japanese
- Budget: <$5 million

Pyrokinesis, also known as Crossfire (Japanese: クロスファイア, Hepburn: Kurosufaia), is a 2000 Japanese science fiction thriller film co-written and directed by Shusuke Kaneko. The film is about a woman with pyrokinetic powers seeking to avenge the murder of her friend's sister. It was based on two novels by Miyuki Miyabe: Crossfire and Hatobuki Grass.

Released by Toho in Japan on June 10, 2000, Pyrokinesis performed only moderately at the box office, but obtained positive reviews and impressed Toho executives, leading to Kaneko making Godzilla, Mothra and King Ghidorah: Giant Monsters All-Out Attack (2001).

== Plot ==
Junko Aoki is a quiet, caring girl who was born with pyrokinesis, the ability to create and control fire with one's mind. From a young age, her mother told her, "You're not an ordinary girl. You mustn't get angry, you mustn't get close to your friends, and you mustn't use your powers." Because of this upbringing, Junko is unable to interact with others. She leads a gloomy existence and, upon entering the workforce, she is shunned by her fellow office workers. Despite this, she meets colleague Kazuki Tada. The two become close friends, and Junko secretly falls in love with him.

However, her newfound happiness comes to an end when Kazuki's younger sister Yukie is murdered by a gang of delinquent boys who kill high school girls for sport. The authorities display a shocking amount of apathy for the situation, and the boys are acquitted due to insufficient evidence and the connections of their ringleader, Masaki Kogure, the son of a district attorney. This angers Kazuki and Junko, who, in their grief, desire to avenge the murder of Kazuki's sister. Junko tells Kazuki about her powers, offering to use them as a means of vengeance. Kazuki agrees with this approach, though he cannot bring himself to let Junko kill.

As Junko attacks the gang and uses her powers more and more, it draws others with similar abilities (known as "espers") to her. It also catches the attention of detectives Ishizu and Makihara, the latter bearing a mysterious grudge against Junko. Soon it is revealed that there is more to the killings than meets the eye, and Junko realizes her place in a vicious circle of violence that threatens to consume everyone.

== Cast ==
- Akiko Yada as Junko Aoki
- Hideaki Itō as Kazuki Tada
- Kaori Momoi as Det. Chikako Ishizu
- Ryuji Harada as Det. Yasuaki Makihara
- Masami Nagasawa as Kaori Kurata – An autistic esper who seeks out Junko as a surrogate mother.
- Hisashi Yoshizawa (credited as Yû Yoshizawa) as Koichi Kido – A friendly esper who can read and control minds by touch.
- Hidenori Tokuyama as Masaki Kogure
- Renji Ishibashi as Eiji Nosaka, Chief of Teramachi Higashi Police Station
- Koichi Ueda as Riot Police Chief
- Ayako Fujitani as Store Staff
- Norman England
- Toshiyuki Nagashima
- Yukijirō Hotaru

== Production ==
Pyrokinesis was based on two novels by Miyuki Miyabe: the anthology novel Hatobuki Grass (鳩笛草, Hatobuesō; specifically the novella "Burnt Offering") and Crossfire. The screenplay also incorporated original story material.

Kaneko made Pyrokinesis in-between two of his kaiju films: Gamera 3: Revenge of Iris and Godzilla, Mothra and King Ghidorah: Giant Monsters All-Out Attack. According to producer Hideyuki Honma, the production of this film was pushed up due to the sudden cancellation of a planned sequel to Saimin.

This was Akiko Yada's first starring role, as well as Masami Nagasawa's debut. A few cast members of Kaneko's Gamera trilogy had cameos in this film, such as Ayako Fujitani and Yukijirō Hotaru.

The film's theme song, "The One Thing", was composed and performed by the Japanese band Every Little Thing. A single mix was included as the B-side to their song "Rescue Me/Smile Again".

For the climactic sequence in which the amusement park bursts into flames, a 1/5-scale miniature of the park was blown up in the studio.

== Release ==
Pyrokinesis was released theatrically in Japan on June 10, 2000, where it was distributed by Toho. The film was released directly to home video in the United States by Tokyo Shock on August 26, 2003.

== See also ==
- Carrie, a 1976 Brian De Palma film.
- The Fury, a 1978 Brian De Palma film.
- Firestarter, a 1984 horror film based on the novel of the same name by Stephen King.
- Spontaneous Combustion, a 1990 Tobe Hooper film.
- Firestarter: Rekindled, a 2002 miniseries sequel to the 1984 film, produced by the Sci-Fi Channel.
- Firestarter, a 2022 remake of the 1984 film.

== Footnotes ==
=== References ===
- England, Norman (April 2002). "GMK: Godzilla's Biggest Smash". Fangoria. No. 211. ASIN B00BDKU3EO.
- Galbraith IV, Stuart (2008). The Toho Studios Story: A History and Complete Filmography. Scarecrow Press. ISBN 978-1461673743.
