= Crossfire (novel) =

Novel by Miyuki Miyabe

- Author: Miyuki Miyabe
- Original title: クロスファイア (Kurosufaia)
- Translator: Deborah Stuhr Iwabuchi, Anna Husson Isozaki
- Language: Japanese
- Genre: Novel
- Publisher: Kodansha (Eng. trans.)
- Publication date: 1998
- Publication place: Japan
- Media type: Print (Hardback)
- Pages: 420 pp (Eng. trans. hardback edition)
- ISBN: 4-7700-2993-4 (Eng. trans. hardback edition)
- OCLC: 61362831
- Dewey Decimal: 895.6/35 22
- LC Class: PL856.I856 K8713 2005

Crossfire (クロスファイア, Kurosufaia) is a novel by Miyuki Miyabe. The novel, published in Japan in 1998, and was published in English by Kodansha America in 2006. The English version was translated by Deborah Stuhr Iwabuchi and Anna Husson Isozaki.

== Plot introduction ==
The novel is about a girl named Junko Aoki (青木淳子 Aoki Junko), who has the psychokinetic power of pyrokinesis. She decides to kill criminals in order to make her world better. When Junko sets off to rescue a woman kidnapped by juvenile delinquents, the arson division of the Tokyo Metropolitan Police and a secretive vigilante group that wants to recruit her, pursue her. Chikako Ishizu (石津ちか子 Ishizu Chikako), a policewoman, is astounded by Junko Aoki's case as she digs deeper into it.

== Film, TV or theatrical adaptations ==
There is a 2000 film version of Crossfire entitled Crossfire (Pyrokinesis in English).

A mobile phone manga version of the novel has been produced by Konami. In addition, featured in Konami's beatmania IIDX 16 EMPRESS is a song titled NΦ CRIME, featuring a video made up of panels from the manga. The lyrics of the English version are based loosely on the premise of the novel.
