= All She Was Worth =

1992 crime novel by Miyuki Miyabe

- Author: Miyuki Miyabe
- Original title: 火車 [Kasha]
- Translator: Alfred Birnbaum
- Language: Japanese
- Genre: Crime, Social mystery
- Publisher: Mariner Books (Eng. tran.)
- Publication date: 1992
- Publication place: Japan
- English publication date: 1996
- Media type: Print (Hardback & Paperback)
- ISBN: 978-0-395-96658-7
- OCLC: 41096131

All She Was Worth is a crime novel by Miyuki Miyabe. It was originally published under the Japanese title Kasha (Japanese: 火車).

== Plot introduction ==
In 1992, Tokyo Metropolitan Police Detective Shunsuke Honma, on leave due to an incident on the job, is hired by his nephew, banker Jun Kurisaka, to track down Kurisaka's fiancée, whom he knows by the name of Shoko Sekine and who disappeared from his life after he discovered her credit history was tainted by bankruptcy. As Honma investigates her circumstances, he finds that the name "Shoko Sekine" actually belongs to someone else other than Kurisaka's fiancée, and that the latter may have murdered the former to achieve this. As Honma navigates the country for clues, he finds that the credit-based economy in Japan, coupled with the country's own system for family identification, have undesirable side effects on ordinary people's lives.

=== Characters ===
(Some of the names were changed in translation and will be noted in italics.)

- Shunsuke Honma, Tokyo Metropolitan Police Inspector, on leave due to an incident on the job (a citizen he was arresting shot him in the knee, disabling him temporarily). He has a 10-year-old adopted son named Makoto, whom he has raised alone since his wife Chizuko died in a car accident in 1989, when her small car was crushed by a truck driven by a sleepy worker. In his new assignment - finding Shoko - Honma has to work unofficially given the strong limitations placed on police officers on leave due to bureaucracy. Being a frugal widower, he looks askance at young couples' illusory dreams often built on credit card and real estate purchases.
- Jun Kurisaka (original Japanese given name Kazuya), young banker, son of Chizuko's cousin. He was looking forward to marrying the woman he knew as Shoko, only to be astonished at her disappearance and later at the revelation that she wasn't really named Shoko. He had met her in October 1990 and proposed to her on Christmas Eve, 1991. Conceited and worried with his parents' approval, but hires Honma behind their backs.
- Tsuneo Isaka, Honma's friend and housekeeper. He was originally an architect but became a house-husband when the Japanese asset price bubble put him out of work, so he worked part-time as a housekeeper for Honma and two other families in the apartment complex where they lived. His wife, Hisae Isaka, runs her own interior designing firm, so the family's income is steady.
- Mr. Imai (original Japanese given name Shirō, unmentioned in translation) and his employee Mitchie (Mit-chan) were boss and co-worker respectively of the fake Shoko at Imai's company, a small-time cash register dealer.
- Gorō Mizoguchi was the real Shoko's bankruptcy lawyer. He is the first one to realize that the "Shoko" Honma was looking for was not the one Kurisaka had known. He later explains to Honma the way the credit industry works and why people like the real Shoko had to declare bankruptcy. His secretary, Ms. Sawagi, receives Honma and later provides additional information on Shoko.
- Nobuko Konno was the real Shoko's landlady at Kawaguchi, Saitama, and managed her property with help from her husband and her daughter Akemi. She tells Honma that Shoko, despite being a good and friendly tenant, had moved out mysteriously, thereby alerting him to the possibility that the identity switch had been violent, possibly due to murder or coercion.
- Sadao Funaki (original Japanese surname Ikari), Honma's co-worker who introduced him to Chizuko, allowing him to marry her despite Funaki's own crush on her. He supports Honma's informal investigation and in the process nails his own official investigation - a woman who murdered her businessman husband because he would not allow her to work outside the home, having a female friend as the accomplice.
- Kanae Miyata, a hairdresser in Shoko's old neighborhood.
- Tamotsu Honda, the real Shoko's best friend from all levels of school. He stayed in Utsunomiya as a mechanic and married Ikumi, the one who first saw Shoko's mother fall down the stairs. They are about to have their second child, but Tamotsu still insists on helping out Honma with the investigation, as Shoko was his original childhood crush.
- Tomie Miyagi, the real Shoko's roommate and bar hostess colleague at a building in Kinshicho, Tokyo.
- Hideki Wada (original Japanese surname Katase), the fake Shoko's boss at Roseline, the Osaka-based mail-order underwear company she worked at to target her victims. He apparently had an affair with her as well. He reveals "Shoko"'s real identity to Honma.
- Kaoru Sudō, Kyōko's roommate in Nagoya, Aichi, when she was getting away from the yakuza who had taken control of the Shinjo family's mortgage payments.
- Orie Chino (original Japanese name Kaori Ichiki), Kyōko's roommate in Osaka. She worked in the company data section (separate from Kyōko's), and wasn't as friendly with her as Kaoru was.
- Shōko Sekine, a woman from Utsunomiya, Tochigi, who went bankrupt as a result of excessive credit card debt, upon which she had to quit her original office job and turn to hostessing in bars. Unlike her impostor, she was not particularly beautiful. Her mother, Yoshiko, died in 1989 - one year before the impostor took over her identity - when she fell down a set of stairs, the circumstances of which were considered suspect.
- Kyōko Shinjō, the impostor Shoko, a very beautiful woman from Fukushima Prefecture. Unlike the real Shoko, who could free herself from debt by declaring bankruptcy, the debts in her life actually belonged to her father, who had taken a large mortgage for the family to have their own home. Kyōko attempted to escape the debt by marrying a young man, Yasuji Kurata, in Ise, Mie, but the yakuza in charge of her father's debt found them, and the marriage ended as a result. Kyōko hatched her plan to have another identity as a result of this.

=== Topics ===
Miyabe's novel touches on many topics, including the Japanese asset price bubble, plus social issues of family registry, the credit industry, the underground credit economy, and the rights and responsibilities of individuals in contrast to that of families.

=== Notes ===
At one point Isaka, Honma's friend and housekeeper, talks about a flaming wagon that takes sinners to hell, citing Japanese Buddhist mythology. This is the kasha (Japanese: 火車, lit. 'fire chariot') of the original Japanese title. The significance is that the real Shoko had gone through hell with her credit card bankruptcy, but then the fake Shoko (Kyōko) had taken her place in the chariot and was going to hell in it.

== Screen adaptations ==
=== TV ===
In 1994 a drama special was made, starring Kunihiko Mitamura as Honma, Yoko Moriguchi as the real Shoko, and Naomi Zaizen as Kyōko. Another version was made in 2011, starring Takaya Kamikawa as Honma, Tomoko Tabata as Shoko, and Nozomi Sasaki as Kyōko. Both versions were produced by TV Asahi.

=== Film ===
Helpless is a 2012 South Korean film adaptation starring Kim Min-hee as Seon-yeong/Gyeong-seon (Shoko/Kyōko), Lee Sun-kyun as her jilted fiancé Mun-ho (Jun), Jo Sung-ha as Mun-ho's cousin Kim Jong-geun (Honma), and Cha Soo-yeon as the real Seon-yeong (Shoko). Unlike in the original Japanese book, where Jun walks out on Honma and refuses to believe he has been tricked (thereby not playing a role in most of the story), Mun-ho helps out Jong-geun in the investigation, despite their differences. Additionally, whereas Honma was just taking leave from his police job and his wife Chizuko was deceased, Kim has resigned from his job in the police department and his wife, Mi-yeon, is still alive.

The original Korean title is Hwacha (cognate of kasha and written with the same hanja); however, the term in Korean usually refers to hwacha (arrow cannons), the kind used to resist the Japanese invasions by Toyotomi Hideyoshi's naval forces in the 16th century.

== See also ==
- Tozai Mystery Best 100 (The Top 100 Mystery Novels of the East and the West)
