= Aqua Timez =

Japanese rock band

- Origin: Japan
- Genres: Rock; emo; punk pop; pop rock; alternative rock; electronic rock; J-pop
- Years active: 2003–2018; 2024–2025
- Label: Epic Records
- Members: Futoshi (vocals); Okp-Star (bass guitar, leader); Daisuke (guitar, programming); Mayuko (keyboards); Tasshi (drums)
- Past members: Avico (drums)
- Website: Official website

Aqua Timez is a Japanese rock band signed to Epic Records.

== Overview ==
Futoshi and OKP-Star met on with9.com in 2000 and attempted to start a band together. Unable to agree on the band's future, the two disbanded. In 2003, the current band members gathered and formed Aqua Timez. Their first independent music mini album, Sora Ippai ni Kanaderu Inori, was released in August 2005. In 2006, the group were signed to Epic Records Japan and released their second mini album, Nanairo no Rakugaki. In the same year they released two singles, "Ketsui no Asa ni" and "Sen no Yoru o Koete", which were used as the theme music in the animated films Brave Story and Bleach: Memories of Nobody respectively. Their music in the films help garnered attention and later they recorded their first full-length studio album Kaze o Atsumete.

As of December 2016, they have released a total of 2 mini albums, 19 singles, 8 albums, and a single compilation album.

On May 8, 2018, the band announced their break up, following their final concert tour "Present is a Present tour 2018".

On July 11, 2024, the band announced that they would reunite for their 20th anniversary and start activities again in 2025, including the release of a new single and a live concert.

== Discography ==
=== Albums ===
Year	Title	Charts		Ref.
Year	Title	Peak	Weeks	Ref.
2005	Sora Ippai ni Kanaderu Inori (空いっぱいに奏でる祈り; lit. "Prayers Playing Across the Whole Sky"): Released: August 24, 2005; Label: MegaForce Corporation SHCC-0002; Track listing: No. / Title / Length; 1. / "Kibō no Saku Oka kara" (希望の咲く丘から, lit. "From the Hill of Blooming Hopes"); 2. / "Himawari" (向日葵, lit. "Sunflower"); 3. / "Tōshindai no Love Song" (等身大のラブソング Tōshindai no Rabu Songu, lit. "Life-Sized Love Song"); 4. / "Hitorigoto" (独り言, lit. "Soliloquy"); 5. / "Jōshōkiryū" (上昇気流, lit. "Updraft"); 6. / "Isshō Seishun" (一生青春, lit. "Forever Young"); 7. / "Hajimari no Heya" (始まりの部屋, lit. "The Beginning Room"); 8. / "Blues on the Run" (Blues on the run); 9. / "Aoi Sora" (青い空, lit. "Blue Sky")	1	73	
2006	Nanairo no Rakugaki (七色の落書き; lit. "Seven-Colored Graffiti"): Released: April 6, 2006; Label: Epic Records ESCL-2806; Track listing: No. / Title / Length; 1. / "Sabão-Dama Days" (シャボン玉Days Shabon-Dama Days, lit. "Soap Bubble Days"); 2. / "Jitensha" (自転車, lit. "Bicycle"); 3. / "Miseinen" (未成年, lit. "Minor"); 4. / "Hitotsu Dake" (ひとつだけ, lit. "Only One"); 5. / "Mr. Roadrunner" (Mr.ロードランナー Misutā Rōdorannā); 6. / "Yoru no Hate" (夜の果て, lit. "End of the Night"); 7. / "Words of Silence" (words of silence); 8. / "Shizuka na Koi no Monogatari" (静かな恋の物語, lit. "A Silent Love Story")	5	28	
2006	Kaze o Atsumete (風をあつめて; lit. "Gather the Wind"): Released: December 6, 2006; Label: Epic Records ESCL-2908, ESCL-2906–2907 (Limited Edition); Track listing: No. / Title / Length; 1. / "1mm"; 2. / "Hoshi no Mienai Yoru" (星の見えない夜, lit. "Starless Night"); 3. / "No Rain, No Rainbow" (No rain, No rainbow); 4. / "Ketsui no Asa ni"; 5. / "Hachimitsu (Daddy, Daddy)" (ハチミツ～Daddy, Daddy～, lit. "Honey (Daddy, Daddy)"); 6. / "Sen no Yoru o Koete"; 7. / "Green-Bird" (green-bird); 8. / "Ayumi"; 9. / "Mastermind" (マスターマインド Masutāmaindo); 10. / "White Hall" (ホワイトホール Howaito Hōru); 11. / "Present" (プレゼント Purezento); 12. / "Perfect World"; 13. / "Itsumo Issho" (いつもいっしょ, lit. "Always Together"); 14. / "Shiroi Mori" (白い森, lit. "White Forest")	6	50	
2007	Dareka no Chijōe (ダレカの地上絵; lit. "Somebody's Geoglyph"): Released: November 21, 2007; Label: Epic Records ESCL-3011; Track listing: No. / Title / Length; 1. / "Isshun no Chiri" (一瞬の塵, lit. "A Moment's Dust"); 2. / "Sekai de Ichiban Chiisana Umi yo" (世界で一番小さな海よ, lit. "The Smallest Sea in the World"); 3. / "Shiori"; 4. / "Chiisana Tenohira"; 5. / "B with U"; 6. / "Pivot" (ピボット Pibotto); 7. / "Hakuchūmu (Interlude)" (白昼夢 (Interlude), lit. "Daydream"); 8. / "Aki no Shita de" (秋の下で, lit. "Beneath Autumn"); 9. / "Alones"; 10. / "Rankiryū" (乱気流, lit. "Turbulence"); 11. / "Garnet" (ガーネット Gānetto); 12. / "Boku no Basho (evergreen)" (僕の場所～evergreen～, lit. "My Place (Evergreen)"); 13. / "Yume Fūsen (Yurikago Version)" (夢風船(yurikago version), lit. "Dream Balloon (Cradle Version)")	2	16	
2009	Utai Sarishi Hana (うたい去りし花; lit. "Muted Singing Flower"): Released: March 11, 2009; Label: Epic Records ESCL-3159, ESCL-3158 (Limited Edition); Track listing: No. / Title / Length; 1. / "Birth" (BIRTH) / 0:38; 2. / "Velonica" / 4:38; 3. / "Wakare no Uta (Still Connected)" (別れの詩 -still connected-, lit. "Song of Parting (Still Connected)") / 4:38; 4. / "Niji" / 5:39; 5. / "Stay Gold" / 4:33; 6. / "Natsu no Kakera" / 4:43; 7. / "Honto wa ne" / 5:09; 8. / "Massigura" (lit. "At Full Speed") / 4:12; 9. / "Tsuki, Noboru" (月、昇る, lit. "The Moon, Rises") / 4:44; 10. / "Kono Hoshi ni" (この星に, lit. "To This Star") / 3:44; 11. / "Kirakira (Original Ver.)" (きらきら ～Original Ver.～, lit. "Sparkle (Original Ver.)) / 5:14; 12. / "One" / 4:41; 13. / "Utai Sarishi Hana" / 7:35; 14. / "Re:Birth" (Re:BIRTH) / 3:02; 15. / "Niji" (Album Ver.) / 6:28	4	17	
2011	Carpe Diem (カルペ・ディエム, Karupe Diemu): Released: February 16, 2011; Label: Epic Records ESCL-3647, ESCL-3645–3646 (Limited Edition); Track listing: No. / Title / Length; 1. / "Hyakunen no Ki" (百年の樹, lit."Centennial Tree") / 4:08; 2. / "Saigo Made" (最後まで, lit. "Till the End") / 4:34; 3. / "Plumeria (Hana Uta)" / 4:56; 4. / "Mayonaka no Orchestra" / 5:54; 5. / "Carpe Diem" (カルペ・ディエム Karupe Diemu) / 6:25; 6. / "Koku (Interlude)" (刻 ～Interlude～) / 1:27; 7. / "Memento Mori" (メメント・モリ) / 5:49; 8. / "Kaze ni Fukarete" / 5:27; 9. / "Milky Blues" / 3:57; 10. / "Let Loose" / 3:37; 11. / "Gravity 0" / 5:05; 12. / "Ehagaki no Haru" / 4:56; 13. / "Ginga Tetsudō no Yoru" (銀河鉄道の夜, lit. "Night on the Galactic Railroad") / 6:39; Total length: / / 62:53	3	9	
2012	Because You Are You (because you are you): Released: September 5, 2012; Label: Epic Records ESCL-3962, ESCL-3960-3961 (Limited Edition); Track listing: No. / Title / Length; 1. / "Onsoku no Fūkei" (音速の風景, lit. "Sonic Speed Landscape"); 2. / "Aurora no Furu Yoru" (オーロラの降る夜 Ōrora no Furu Yoru, lit. "The Nightfall Aurora"); 3. / "Because You Are You" (because you are you); 4. / "Tsubomi"; 5. / "Wa ni Natte" (輪になって, lit. "In a Ring"); 6. / "Lost Parade" (LOST PARADE); 7. / "Mask"; 8. / "Nemari-iro no Fiction" (鉛色のフィクション Nemari-iro no Fikushon, lit. "Lead Grey Fiction"); 9. / "Good Sleep" (good sleep); 10. / "Kimi to Nara feat. LG Monkeys, Sachiko Ishibashi" (君となら feat. LGMonkees、いしばしさちこ, lit. "If Only You"); 11. / "Usagi no Shippo" (兎のしっぽ, lit. "Rabbit's Tail"); 12. / "Home" (HOME)	5	6	
2014	Erufu no Namida (エルフの涙; lit. "Elf Tears"): Released: August 8, 2014; Label: Epic Records ESCL-4267, ESCL-4265 (Limited Edition); Track listing: No. / Title / Length; 1. / "Adamu no Kakugo" (アダムの覚悟, lit. "Adam's Resolution"); 2. / "Ivu no Ketsuron" (イヴの結論, lit. "Eve's Conclusion"); 3. / "Hinayume" (ヒナユメ, lit. "A Young Girl's Dream"); 4. / "Eden" (エデン, lit. "Eden"); 5. / "Omuretto" (オムレット, lit. "Omelette"); 6. / "Akai Yane no Mieru Oka e" (赤い屋根の見える丘へ, lit. "The Hill Seen from the Red Roof"); 7. / "Shimi Tsudukeru Kaiga" (滲み続ける絵画, lit. "Impressive Painting"); 8. / "Gold Medal" (ゴールドメダル, lit. "Gold Medal"); 9. / "hey my men feat.OK.Joe"; 10. / "Fly Fish"; 11. / "The FANtastic Journey"; 12. / "Tegami Henshin" (手紙返信, lit. "Reply to a Letter"); 13. / "Erufu no Namida" (エルフの涙, lit. "Elf Tears"); 14. / "Aitowani/Taranchura" (アイトワニ／タランチュラ, lit. "?/Tarantula")	9	5	
2015	10th Anniversary Best Blue: Released: August 24, 2015; Label: Epic Records ESCL-4769, ESCL-4767/8 (Limited Edition); Track listing: No. / Title / Length; 1. / "Sen No Yoru Wo Koete"; 2. / "Alones"; 3. / "Velonica"; 4. / "Stay Gold"; 5. / "Gravity 0"; 6. / "Mayonaka No Orchestra"; 7. / "Mask"; 8. / "Eden"; 9. / "Tegamihenshin"; 10. / "Sing Along"; 11. / "Saigomade2"; 12. / "Noumunochi"; 14. / "Lost Parade"; 15. / "Eve No Ketsuron"			
2016	Asunarou (アスナロウ): Released: December 14, 2016; Label: Epic Records ESCL-4769, ESCL-4767/8 (Limited Edition); Track listing: No. / Title / Length; 1. / "Asunarou" (アスナロウ, lit. ""); 2. / "Saigo Made II" (最後までII lit. "Until the End II"); 3. / "Kuusouraku" (空想楽, lit. "Daydream Fun"); 4. / "We must"; 5. / "Fuyuzora" (冬空, lit. "Winter Sky"); 6. / "Jyuu Ni Gatsu no Himawari" (12月のひまわり lit. "December Sunflower"); 7. / "Sori ni Notte" (ソリに乗って, lit. "Get on the Sleigh"); 8. / "Sandee Paaku" (サンデーパーク, lit. "Sunday Park"); 9. / "Napori" (ナポリ, lit. "Naples"); 10. / "Dub Duddy ~ Raibu Senjitsu ni Mita Yume" (Dub Duddy～ライブ前日に見た夢～, lit. "Dub Daddy – Live dream seen on a previous day"); 11. / "Mikazuki Shaabetto" (三日月シャーベット, lit. "New Moon Sherbet"); 12. / "Senkou" (閃光 lit. "Flash"); 13. / "Pascal"; 14. / "Ikite" (生きて lit. "Live"); 15. / "Mahou o tsukai hatashite" (魔法を使い果たして lit. "Use up Magic")	14	3	
2018	Nijyūrasen no Masayume (二重螺旋のまさゆめ): Released: April 25, 2018; Label: Epic Records	15	5	
2025	Umi Ippai Ni Furishikiru Hoshi (海いっぱいに降りしきる星): Released: December 10, 2025; Label: Epic Records	10	1	
"—" denotes releases that did not chart.

=== Compilation album ===
Year
Title
Charts
Ref.
Peak
Weeks
2009
The Best of Aqua Timez
- Released: October 14, 2009
- Label: Epic Records ESCL-3303/4, ESCL-3300/2 (Limited Edition)

Disc 1
No.	Title	Length
1.	"Sen no Yoru o Koete"
2.	"Niji"
3.	"Hachimitsu (Daddy, Daddy)"
4.	"Stay Gold"
5.	"Chiisana Tenohira"
6.	"Alones"
7.	"Velonica"
8.	"Ayumi"
9.	"Hitotsu Dake"
10.	"Honto wa ne"
11.	"Aki no Shita de"
12.	"Aoi Sora"
13.	"Saigo Made"

Disc 2
No.	Title	Length
1.	"Tōshindai no Love Song"
2.	"Shabondama Days"
3.	"Sekai de Ichiban Chiisana Umi yo"
4.	"Ketsui no Asa ni"
5.	"Shiori"
6.	"Kibō no Saku Oka kara"
7.	"Isshun no Chiri"
8.	"Natsu no Kakera"
9.	"Itsumo Issho"
10.	"Hoshi no Mienai Yoru"
11.	"Plumeria (Hana Uta)"
12.	"Himawari"
13.	"Shiroi Mori"

Limited Edition DVD
No.	Title	Length
1.	"Chiisana Tenohira"
2.	"Tōshindai no Love Song"
3.	"Ketsui no Asa ni"
4.	"Sen no Yoru o Koete"
5.	"Shiori"
6.	"Alones"
7.	"Niji"
8.	"Natsu no Kakera"
9.	"Velonica"
10.	"Stay Gold"
11.	"Plumeria (Hana Uta)"
12.	"Saigo Made"
13.	"Yasashii Kioku (Evalasting II)"
14.	"Honto wa ne"
15.	"on the run"
16.	"B with U"
17.	"Itsumo Issho"
18.	"Ayumi"
19.	"Hitotsu Dake"
20.	"Sabão-Dama Days"
21.	"Kibō no Saku Oka kara"

1
22

=== Singles ===
Year	Title	Charts		Ref.
Year	Title	Peak	Weeks	Ref.
2006	"Ketsui no Asa ni" (決意の朝に; lit. "On the Morning of Determination"): Released: July 5, 2006; Label: Epic Records ESCL-2844; "Ketsui no Asa ni" was used as the theme music for the animated film of Brave Story.; Track listing: No. / Title / Length; 1. / "Ketsui no Asa ni"; 2. / "Ayumi" (歩み, lit "Walking"); 3. / "Sabishiki Warera" (淋しき我ら, lit. "Our Loneliness"); 4. / "Ketsui no Asa ni" (Instrumental Mix)	4	35	
2006	Sen no Yoru o Koete (千の夜をこえて; lit. "Beyond a Thousand Nights"): Released: November 22, 2006; Label: Epic Records ESCL-2905, ESCL-2901–2902 (Limited Edition), ESCL-2903–2904 (Limited Time); "Sen no Yoru o Koete" was used as the theme music for Bleach: Memories of Nobody.; Track listing: No. / Title / Length; 1. / "Sen no Yoru o Koete"; 2. / "Sen no Yoru o Koete" (Instrumental Mix)	5	22	
2007	"Shiori" (しおり, lit. "Bookmark"): Released: May 9, 2007; Label: Epic Records ESCL-2844; "Shiori" was used as the theme music for a commercial of Mitsuya Cider.; Track listing: No. / Title / Length; 1. / "Shiori"; 2. / "Yume Fūsen" (夢風船, lit. "Dream Balloon")	5	14	
2007	"Alones" (ALONES): Released: August 1, 2007; Label: Epic Records ESCL-2981; "Alones" was used as the opening to episodes 121–143 of the anime series Bleach.; Track listing: No. / Title / Length; 1. / "Alones"; 2. / "Akatsuki" (暁, lit. "Daybreak"); 3. / "Mr. Roadrunner" (DJ Mass'Skate Sonic* Remix); 4. / "Alones (Instrumental Mix)"	3	15	
2007	"Chiisana Tenohira" (小さな掌; lit. "Little Palm"): Released: October 31, 2007; Label: Epic Records ESCL-3003; Track listing: No. / Title / Length; 1. / "Chiisana Tenohira"; 2. / "Chiisana Tenohira" (Instrumental Mix)	4	10	
2008	"Niji" (虹; lit. "Rainbow"): Released: May 7, 2008; Label: Epic Records ESCL-3064; "Niji" was the theme music used for the Gokusen drama.; Track listing: No. / Title / Length; 1. / "Niji"; 2. / "Yasashii Kioku (Evalasting II)" (優しい記憶～evalastingII～, lit. "Kind Memory (Everlasting II)"); 3. / "Honto wa ne" (ほんとはね, lit. "The Real Truth"); 4. / "No Live, No Life" (No live, No life); 5. / "Niji" (Instrumental Mix)	2	31	
2008	"Natsu no Kakera" (夏のかけら; lit. "Fragments of Summer"): Released: October 1, 2008; Label: Epic Records ESCL-3105; Track listing: No. / Title / Length; 1. / "Natsu no Kakera"; 2. / "Aki ni Naru no ni" (秋になるのに, lit. "Although It's Becoming Fall"); 3. / "on the run"; 4. / "Natsu no Kakera" (Instrumental)	8	5	
2009	"Velonica": Released: January 14, 2009; Label: Epic Records ESCL-3147; "Velonica" was the opening theme music used for episodes 190–214 of the anime Bleach.; Track listing: No. / Title / Length; 1. / "Velonica"; 2. / "Kanade Ai" (奏であい, lit. "Playing Together"); 3. / "Kaori" (薫, lit. "Fragrance"); 4. / "Velonica" (Instrumental)	2	10	
2009	"Stay Gold" (STAY GOLD): Released: March 4, 2009; Label: Epic Records ESCL-3165–3166; Track listing: No. / Title / Length; 1. / "Stay Gold"; 2. / "Stay Gold" (Instrumental)	11	3	
2009	"Plumeria (Hana Uta)" (プルメリア ～花唄～, Purumeria ~Hana Uta~; lit. "Plumeria (Flower Song)"): Released: July 29, 2009; Label: Epic Records ESCL-3423; Plumeria (Hana Uta) was the theme music used for the Gokusen film.; Track listing: No. / Title / Length; 1. / "Plumeria (Hana Uta)"; 2. / "Nagasugita Yoru ni" (長すぎた夜に, lit. "In the Overly Long Night"); 3. / "Perfect World" (Blue Forest Ver.); 4. / "Plumeria (Hana Uta)" (Instrumental)	7	9	
2010	"Ehagaki no Haru" (絵はがきの春; lit. "Springtime Postcard"): Released: January 27, 2010; Label: Epic Records ESCL-3361; Track listing: No. / Title / Length; 1. / "Ehagaki no Haru"; 2. / "Ryūsei no Uta" (流星のうた, lit. "Song of the Falling Star"); 3. / "Sora ni Chikai Machi" (空に近い街, lit. "A City Close to the Sky"); 4. / "Ehagaki no Haru" (Instrumental)	8	5	
2010	"Gravity 0" (GRAVITY Ø): Released: October 13, 2010; Label: Epic Records ESCL-3524; "GRAVITY 0" was used as the opening theme to the anime series Star Driver: Kagayaki no Takuto.; Track listing: No. / Title / Length; 1. / "Gravity 0"; 2. / ""Tsuki no Curtain"" (月のカーテン Tsuki no Kāten, lit. "Moon Curtain"); 3. / ""Pocket no Naka no Uchū"" (ポケットの中の宇宙 Poketto no Naka no Uchū, lit. "A Universe in a Pocket"); 4. / "Gravity 0" (Instrumental)	5	6	
2011	"Mayonaka no Orchestra" (真夜中のオーケストラ, Mayonaka no Ōkesutora; lit. "Midnight Orchestra"): Released: January 27, 2011; Label: Epic Records ESCL-3635; Mayonaka no Orchestra was the ending theme for episodes 193–205 of the anime Naruto Shippuden.; Track listing: No. / Title / Length; 1. / "Mayonaka no Orchestra"; 2. / "Kaze ni Fukarete" (風に吹かれて, lit. "Blowing in the Wind"); 3. / "Full a Gain"; 4. / "Mayonaka no Orchestra" (Instrumental)	12	4	
2012	"Mask" (MASK): Released: February 22, 2012; Label: Epic Records ESCL-3851; "MASK" was the last ending theme from episodes 355 to 366 of the anime Bleach.; Track listing: No. / Title / Length; 1. / "Mask"; 2. / "Sora ni Tsuzuku Michi" (空につづく道, lit. "The Path Leading to the Sky"); 3. / "1980"; 4. / "Mask" (Instrumental)	10	3	
2012	"Tsubomi" (つぼみ; lit. "Flower Bud"): Released: August 22, 2012; Label: Epic Records ESCL-3958; "Tsubomi" is used as the theme song for the NTV drama Ghost Mama Criminal Investigation.; Track listing: No. / Title / Length; 1. / "Tsubomi"; 2. / "Heikō Sekai" (平行世界, lit. "Parallel Worlds"); 3. / "Isshun no Chiri" (Kawasaki Electro Academy Mix) (Remixed by Takeshi Ueda (AA=)+Kei Kusama); 4. / "Tsubomi" (Instrumental)	14	5	
2013	"Eden" (エデン, Eden; lit. "Eden"): Released: November 27, 2013; Label: Epic Records ESCL-4130; Eden was the ending theme for episodes 1–13 of the anime Magi: The Kingdom of Magic.; Track listing: No. / Title / Length; 1. / "Eden" (エデン, lit. "Eden"); 2. / "Kuranburi Jyamu" (クランベリージャム, lit. "Cranberry Jam"); 3. / "The FANtastic Journey"; 4. / "Eden(LITTLE PARADE session)"; 5. / "エデン(Instrumental)" (Instrumental); 6. / "エデン(アニメ劇中Version)" (Anime Version)	22	7	
2014	"Ikite" (生きて, Ikite; lit. "Live"): Released: December 3, 2014; Label: Epic Records ESCL-4332; Theme song of the TBS Television Drama Sakura: Jiken wo Kiku Onna SAKURA ~ 事件を聞く女; Track listing: No. / Title / Length; 1. / "Ikite" (生きて, lit. "Live"); 2. / "MASK(Shoes and Stargazing version)"; 3. / "Ikite(Instrumental)" (生きて, lit. "Live")	23	3	
2015	"Saigo Made II" (最後までII, Saigo Made II; lit. "Until the End II"): Released: August 5, 2015; Label: Epic Records ESCL-4497; Saigo Made II was the ending theme for episodes 193–205 of the anime Gintama°.; Track listing: No. / Title / Length; 1. / "Saigo Made II" (最後までII, lit. "Until the End II"); 2. / "Razuberii Jyamu" (ラズベリージャム, lit. "Raspberry Jam"); 3. / "Saigo Made II (Instrumental)" (最後までII (Instrumental), lit. "Until the End II (Instrumental)")	31	3	
2016	"Jyuunigatsu no Himawari" (12月のひまわり, Jyuunigatsu no Himawari; lit. "December Sunflower"): Released: September 28, 2016; Label: Epic Records ESCL-4691; Track listing: No. / Title / Length; 1. / "Jyuunigatsu no Himawari" (12月のひまわり, lit. "December Sunflower"); 2. / "Gifu to" (岐阜と, lit. "Gifu"); 3. / "Jyuunigatsu no Himawari (Instrumental)" (12月のひまわり, lit. "December Sunflower"); 4. / "Gifu to" (岐阜と(Instrumental), lit. "Gifu")	22	3	
"—" denotes releases that did not chart.
