= Miyuki Miyabe =

Japanese writer

- 宮部 みゆき
- Born: December 23, 1960 (age 65); Koto-ku, Tokyo, Japan
- Occupation: Author
- Writing career
- Genres: Science fiction; Mystery fiction; Social mystery; Historical fiction; Social commentary; Juvenile fiction
- Notable works: All She Was Worth; Brave Story; Riyuu (The Reason)
- Notable awards: Mystery Writers of Japan Award; Yoshikawa Eiji Prize for New Writers; Yoshikawa Eiji Prize for Literature; Shiba Ryotaro Prize; Yamamoto Shūgorō Prize; Naoki Prize
- Website: www.osawa-office.co.jp/write/miyabe.html

Miyuki Miyabe (宮部みゆき, Miyabe Miyuki; born December 23, 1960) is a Japanese writer of genre fiction. She has won numerous Japanese literary awards, including the Yoshikawa Eiji Prize for New Writers, the Yoshikawa Eiji Prize for Literature, the Shiba Ryotaro Prize, the Yamamoto Shūgorō Prize, and the Naoki Prize. Her work has been widely adapted for film, television, manga, and video games, and has been translated into over a dozen languages.

== Early life and education ==
Miyabe was born in Tokyo, Japan in 1960. Her mother was a seamstress and her father was an assembly line worker at a factory. She graduated from Sumidagawa High School, then attended a business training school before taking an administrative job at a law office.

== Career ==
Miyabe started writing novels at the age of 23. In 1984, while working at a law office, Miyabe began to take writing classes at a writing school run by the Kodansha publishing company. She made her literary debut in 1987 with 'Our Neighbour is a Criminal' "Warera ga rinjin no hanzai" (我らが隣人の犯罪), which won the 26th All Yomimono Mystery Novel Newcomer Prize and the Japan Mystery Writers Association Prize. She has since written dozens of novels and won numerous literary prizes.

Miyabe's novel All She Was Worth (火車, Kasha), set at the beginning of Japan's lost decade and telling the story of a Tokyo police inspector's search for a missing woman who might be an identity thief trying to get clear of debt, was published by Futabasha in 1992. The next year Kasha won the Yamamoto Shūgorō Prize, which is awarded for a new literary work that excels at storytelling in any genre. Kasha was adapted into a television movie by TV Asahi in 1994, then again in 2011. The Japanese version of the book sold millions of copies. An English translation of Kasha, translated by Alfred Birnbaum, was published by Kodansha International under the title All She Was Worth in 1997. Marilyn Stasio of The New York Times positively noted the relationship between the "spare style and measured pace" of Birnbaum's translation and the "somber tone of Miyuki's theme" of individual value in a consumerist economy, while Cameron Barr of The Christian Science Monitor wrote that the book's treatment of privacy and data tracking would leave the impression that "personal privacy is a rickety antique."

The Reason (理由, Riyū), a multiple perspective murder mystery set in Tokyo's Arakawa ward and written in the form of research interviews conducted in mostly polite language with the suspect, neighbors, and family members of the victims, was published in book form in 1998. Riyū won the 17th Japan Adventure Fiction Association Prize in the Japanese novel category that same year. In 1999 Riyū won the 120th Naoki Prize. Scholar Noriko Chino has described Riyū as "one of the masterpieces of postwar fictional social criticism." Riyū was adapted into a Nobuhiko Obayashi movie that was first shown on the Wowow television channel before its 2004 theatrical release.

Miyabe's novel Crossfire (クロスファイア, Kurosufaia), about a police detective pursuing a girl with pyrokinetic powers, was published in the same year as Riyū. It was adapted into the 2000 Toho film Pyrokinesis, starring Akiko Yada and Masami Nagasawa. An English version of Crossfire, translated by Deborah Stuhr Iwabuchi and Anna Husson Isozaki, was published in 2006, with Kirkus Reviews calling it "the most conventional of her three novels translated into English". In 2003 Kadokawa Shoten published Miyabe's fantasy novel Brave Story, a story about a boy with a troubled home life who finds a portal to another world. Brave Story became a bestseller in Japan, and has since been adapted into an anime film, a manga series, and a series of video games. The English version of the novel, translated by Alexander O. Smith, won the Mildred L. Batchelder Award in 2008.

== Writing style ==
Miyabe has written novels in several different genres, including science fiction, mystery fiction, historical fiction, social commentary, and young adult literature. Outside of Japan she is better known for her crime and fantasy novels. English translations of her work include Crossfire (クロスファイア), published in 1998, and Kasha (火車), translated by Alfred Birnbaum as All She Was Worth, published in 1999. Literary scholar Amanda Seaman called Kasha "a watershed moment in the history of women's detective fiction" that inspired "a new wave of women mystery writers."

A common theme in Miyabe's work is community, particularly the effects of consumerism in Japanese society on family and community relationships.

== Awards ==
Awards won by Miyuki Miyabe
Year	Award	Category	Work
1992	45th Mystery Writers of Japan Award	Best Novel	The Sleeping Dragon
1992	13th Yoshikawa Eiji Prize for New Writers		Honjo Fukagawa Fushigi-zōshi
1993	6th Yamamoto Shūgorō Prize		All She Was Worth
1997	18th Japan SF Award		Gamōtei Jiken
1998	17th Japan Adventure Fiction Association Prize		Riyū (The Reason)
1999	120th Naoki Prize (1998下)		Riyū (The Reason)
2001	5th Shiba Ryotaro Prize		Puppet Master
2007	41st Yoshikawa Eiji Prize for Literature		Namonaki Doku (Nameless Poison)
2008	Batchelder Award	Best Translated Children's Book	Brave Story

== Bibliography ==
=== Books in Japanese ===
- Pāfekuto burū (パーフェクト・ブルー, Perfect Blue), Tokyo Sogensha, 1989, ISBN 9784488023157
- Majutsu wa sasayaku (魔術はささやく), Shinchosha, 1989, ISBN 9784103750017
- Warera ga rinjin no hanzai (我らが隣人の犯罪), Bungeishunjū, 1990, ISBN 9784163115207
- Tōkyō satsujin boshoku (東京殺人暮色), Kobunsha, 1990, ISBN 9784334028671
- Reberu 7 (レベル7, Level 7), Shinchosha, 1990, ISBN 9784106027222
- Ryu wa nemuru (龍は眠る), Shuppan Geijutsusha, 1991, ISBN 9784882930303
- Honjo Fukagawa fushigi-zōshi (本所深川ふしぎ草紙), Shin Jinbutsu Ōraisha, 1991, ISBN 9784404018144
- Henji wa iranai (返事はいらない), Jitsugyo no Nihon Sha, 1991, ISBN 9784408531557
- Kamaitachi (かまいたち), Shin Jinbutsu Ōraisha, 1992, ISBN 9784404018878
- Kon'ya wa nemurenai (今夜は眠れない, Heartache Tonight), Chuo Koronsha, 1992, ISBN 9784120020919
- Sunāku-gari (スナーク狩り, Snark Hunting), 1992, ISBN 9784334029845
- Kasha (火車, All She Was Worth), Futabasha, 1992, ISBN 9784575231175
- Nagai nagai satsujin (長い長い殺人), Kobunsha, 1992, ISBN 9784334922115
- Torinokosarete (とり残されて), Bungeishunjū, 1992, ISBN 9784163134802
- Suteppufazā suteppu (ステップファザー・ステップ, Stepfather Step), Kodansha, 1993, ISBN 9784062062169
- Furueru iwa (震える岩), Shin Jinbutsu Ōraisha, 1993, ISBN 9784404020574
- Sabishii karyūdo (淋しい狩人, Lonesome Hunter), Shinchosha, 1993, ISBN 9784103750024
- Chikagai no ame (地下街の雨), Shueisha, 1994, ISBN 9784087740615
- Genshoku Edo-goyomi (幻色江戸ごよみ), Shinchosha, 1994, ISBN 9784101369198
- Yume ni mo omowanai (夢にも思わない)), Chuo Koronsha, 1995, ISBN 9784120024450
- Hatsu monogatari (初ものがたり), PHP Kenkyūjo, 1995, ISBN 9784569547855
- Hatobuesō (鳩笛草), Kobunsha, 1995, ISBN 9784334071530
- Hitojichi Canon (人質カノン, Hostage Canon), Bungeishunjū, 1996, ISBN 978-4163160702
- Gamōtei Jiken (蒲生邸事件), Mainichi Shinbunsha, 1996, ISBN 9784620105512
- Kannin bako (堪忍箱), Shin Jinbutsu Ōraisha, 1996, ISBN 9784404024336
- Tengu kaze (天狗風), Shin Jinbutsu Ōraisha, 1997, ISBN 9784404025449
- Kokoro torokasu yōna: Masa no jikenbo (心とろかすような マサの事件簿), Tōkyō Sōgensha, 1997, ISBN 9784488023546
- Riyū (理由, The Reason), Asahi Shinbunsha, 1998, ISBN 9784022572448
- Kurosufaia (クロスファイア, Crossfire), Kobunsha, 1998, ISBN 9784334073138
- Bonkura (ぼんくら), Kodansha, 2000, ISBN 9784062100885
- Ayashi (あやし), Kadokawa Shoten, 2000, ISBN 9784048732383
- Mohōhan (模倣犯, The Copycat), Shogakkan, 2001, ISBN 9784093792646
- R.P.G. (Shadow Family), Shueisha, 2001, ISBN 9784087473490
- Dorīmu Basutā (ドリームバスター, Dream Buster) volumes 1-4, Tokuma Shoten, 2001–07, ISBN 9784198614423 (vol. 1)
- Akanbē (あかんべえ), PHP Kenkyūjo, 2002, ISBN 9784569620770
- Bureibu sutōrī (ブレイブ・ストーリー, Brave Story), Kadokawa Shoten, 2003, ISBN 9784048734455
- Dare ka (誰か, Somebody), Bungeishunjū, 2003, ISBN 9784408534497
- Iko: kiri no shiro (イコ:霧の城, Ico), Kodansha, 2004, ISBN 9784062124416
- Higurashi (日暮らし), Kodansha, 2005, ISBN 9784062127363 (vol. 1) ISBN 9784062127370 (vol. 2)
- Koshuku no Hito (孤宿の人), Shin Jinbutsu Ōraisha, 2005, ISBN 9784404032577 (vol. 1) ISBN 9784404032584 (vol. 2)
- Na mo naki doku (名もなき毒, Nameless Poison), Gentōsha, 2006, ISBN 9784344012141
- Rakuen (楽園, Paradise), Bungeishunjū, 2007, ISBN 9784163262406 (vol. 1) ISBN 9784163263601 (vol. 2)
- Osoroshi : Mishimaya henchō hyakumonogatari kotohajime (おそろし 三島屋変調百物語事始), Kadokawa Shoten, 2008, ISBN 9784048738590
- Eiyū no sho (英雄の書, The Book of Heroes), Mainichi Shinbunsha, 2009, ISBN 9781421527758 (vol. 1) ISBN 9784620107349 (vol. 2)
- Kogure shashinkan (小暮写眞館), Kodansha, 2010, ISBN 9784062162227

=== Selected works in English ===
==== Crime/thriller novels ====
- All She Was Worth (original title: Kasha), trans. Alfred Birnbaum, Kodansha International, 1996, ISBN 9784770019226
- Crossfire, trans. Deborah Iwabuchi and Anna Isozaki, Kodansha International, 2005, ISBN 9784770029935
- Shadow Family (original title: R.P.G.), trans. Juliet Winters Carpenter, Kodansha International, 2005, ISBN 9784770030047
- The Devil's Whisper (original title: Majutsu wa sasayaku), trans. Deborah Iwabuchi, Kodansha International, 2007, ISBN 9784770031174
- The Sleeping Dragon (original title: Ryū wa nemuru), trans. Deborah Iwabuchi, Kodansha International, 2009, ISBN 9784770031044
- Puppet Master (original title: Mohōhan), trans. Ginny Tapley Takemori, Creek & River Co., 2014–2016, released only in five ebook volumes

==== Fantasy novels ====
- Brave Story, trans. Alexander O. Smith, VIZ Fiction, 2007, ISBN 9781421511962
- The Book of Heroes (original title: Eiyu no sho), trans. Alexander O. Smith, Haikasoru, 2009, ISBN 9781421527758
- Ico: Castle in the Mist, trans. Alexander O. Smith, Haikasoru, 2011, ISBN 9781421540634
- The Gate of Sorrows, trans. Jim Hubbert, Haikasoru, 2016, ISBN 9781421586526

==== Short stories ====
- "The Futon Room" (original title: "Futon-beya"), trans. Stephen A. Carter, Kaiki: Uncanny Tales from Japan, Volume 1: Tales of Old Edo, 2009
- Apparitions: Ghosts of Old Edo, trans. Daniel Huddleston, Haikasoru, 2013, ISBN 9781421567426
  - "A Drowsing Dream of Shinjū" (original title: "Inemuri shinjū")
  - "Cage of Shadows" (original title: "Kage rō")
  - "The Futon Storeroom" (original title: "Futon-beya")
  - "The Plum Rains Fall" (original title: "Ume no ame furu")
  - "The “Oni” of the Adachi House" (original title: "Adachi ke no oni")
  - "A Woman's Head" (original title: "Onna no kubi")
  - "The Oni in the Autumn Rain" (original title: "Shigure Oni")
  - "Ash Kagura" (original title: "Hai kagura")
  - "The Mussel Mound" (original title: "Shijimi-zuka")
- "Chiyoko", Phantasm Japan: Fantasies Light and Dark, From and About Japan, 2014

==== Essay ====
- My Favourite Mystery, "An Incident" by Shohei Ooka (Mystery Writers of Japan, Inc. )

== Film and other adaptations ==
=== Films ===
- Pyrokinesis, Toho, 2000
- Mohōhan, Toho, 2002
- Brave Story, Gonzo, 2006
- Helpless, CJ E&M, 2012
- Solomon's Perjury, Shochiku, 2015

=== Television ===
- Shuku Satsujin (1988)
- Majutsu wa sasayaku (TV movie), NTV, 1990
- Saboten no Hana (1991)
- Unmei no Juko (based on "Snark Gari")(1992)
- Tatta Hitori (1992)
- Henshin (1993)
- Kasha: Kādo hasan no onna! (1994 TV movie)
- Isshun no Sinjitsu (1994)
- Level Seven (1994)
- Ryū wa Nemuru (1994)
- Iwazunioite (1997)
- Gamoutei Jiken, NHK, 1998
- Moshichi no Jikienbo (2001, 2002, 2003)
- R.P.G., NHK, 2003
- The Reason (TV movie), Wowow, 2004
- Nagai Nagai Satsujin (TV movie), Wowow, 2007
- Perfect Blue (TV movie), Wowow, 2010
- Hansai (Anthology episode), Fuji TV, 2010
- Majutsu wa sasayaku (TV movie), Fuji TV, 2011
- Kasha (TV movie), TV Asahi, 2011
- Stepfather Step, TBS, 2012
- Perfect Blue, TBS, 2012
- Riyū (TV movie), TBS, 2012
- Snark Gari (TV movie), TBS, 2012
- Nagai Nagai Satsujin (TV movie), TBS, 2012
- Level Seven (TV movie), TBS, 2012
- Samishii Kariudo (TV movie), Fuji TV, 2013
- Kogure Shashinkan, NHK, 2013
- Nomonaki Doku, TBS, 2013
- Petero no souretsu, TBS, 2014
- Osoroshi, NHK, 2014
- Sakura Housara, NHK, 2014
- Bonkura, NHK, 2014-2015
- 模倣犯, TV Tokyo, 2016
- Solomon's Perjury, JTBC, 2016-2017
- Rakuen, Wowow, 2017
- Copycat Killer, Netflix, 2023

=== Manga ===
- Brave Story, 2007

== See also ==
- List of Japanese women writers
