= Helpless (2012 film) =

- Hangul: 화차
- Hanja: 火車
- RR: Hwacha
- MR: Hwach'a
- Directed by: Byun Young-joo
- Written by: Byun Young-joo
- Based on: All She Was Worth by Miyabe Miyuki
- Produced by: Shin Hye-eun; Oh Ki-min
- Starring: Lee Sun-kyun; Kim Min-hee; Jo Sung-ha
- Cinematography: Kim Dong-young
- Edited by: Park Gok-ji
- Music by: Kim Hong-jib
- Production companies: Boim Pictures; Filament Pictures
- Distributed by: CJ E&M
- Release date: March 8, 2012
- Running time: 117 minutes
- Country: South Korea
- Language: Korean
- Box office: ₩18.5 billion (US$16.2 million)

Helpless (Korean: 화차; RR: Hwacha) is a 2012 South Korean psychological thriller film written and directed by Byun Young-joo based on the bestselling novel All She Was Worth (火車) by Japanese writer Miyabe Miyuki. The original title, Hwacha, ("Kasha" in Japanese) means "fire cart," and refers to a train to hell from Japanese folklore. Passengers can only board but not get off.

A man searches for his fiancée who vanished without a trace, only to discover dark, shocking truths about her.

== Plot ==
South Korea, 2009. A few days before their wedding, veterinarian Jang Mun-ho (Lee Sun-kyun) and his fiancee Kang Seon-yeong (Kim Min-hee) pull over for coffee at a motorway rest stop on the way to visiting his parents in Andong, southeast of Seoul. However, when Mun-ho returns to the car, Seon-yeong has disappeared and is not reachable on her mobile phone. All he can find is a hairpin in the rest stop's toilet. From the mess at her flat in Seoul, it looks as if there has been a break-in. Mystified, Mun-ho then learns from a banker friend, Dong-woo (Kim Min-jae), that Seon-yeong had earlier applied for a bank account but had been turned down when it was discovered she had a history of personal bankruptcy dating back to 2007. Investigating her debt history, Mun-ho finds she had been using someone else's name and identity. He persuades his cousin, Kim Jong-geun (Jo Sung-ha), a former police detective sacked for taking bribes, to help find her. Examining her flat, Jong-geun finds she left no fingerprints, had no friends and claimed her mother died two years before. It then turns out that the woman (Cha Soo-yeon) whose identity she assumed two years before had a debt history and had vanished. Visiting Seon-yeong's hometown, Jong-geun hears rumors she killed her mother for the insurance money. Seon-yeong's real name is, in fact, Cha Gyeong-seon, and Jong-geun and Mun-ho realize Gyeong-seon is now looking to take on another woman's identity. They think they know her next target.

== Cast ==
- Lee Sun-kyun ... Jang Mun-ho
- Kim Min-hee ... Kang Seon-yeong / Cha Gyeong-seon
- Jo Sung-ha ... Kim Jong-geun
- Kim Byul ... Han-na
- Cha Soo-yeon ... the real Kang Seon-yeong
- Choi Deok-moon ... Police detective Ha Seong-shik
- Lee Hee-joon ... Noh Seung-ju, Gyeong-seon's ex-husband
- Kim Min-jae ... Lee Dong-woo
- Choi Il-hwa ... Mun-ho's father
- Bae Min-hee ... Client from veterinary clinic
- Im Ji-kyu ... Stalker
- Kim Soo-jin ... Jong-geun's wife
- Park Hae-joon ... Loan shark
- Jin Seon-kyu ... Purser

== Box office ==
Helpless debuted at No. 1 on the weekend box office, only three days after its premiere on March 8, attracting 607,463 moviegoers and grossing ₩4.7 million between March 9 and 11. It topped the chart for two consecutive weeks, selling 561,666 tickets between March 16 and 18, according to KOBIS (Korean Box Office Information System). It was the twelfth most-watched Korean film of 2012, with 2,436,400 tickets sold.

== Awards and nominations ==
2012 Baeksang Arts Awards

- Best Director - Byun Young-joo
- Nomination - Best Film
- Nomination - Best Actress - Kim Min-hee

2012 Buil Film Awards

- Best Actress - Kim Min-hee
- Nomination - Best Film
- Nomination - Best Director - Byun Young-joo
- Nomination - Best Supporting Actor - Jo Sung-ha

2012 Blue Dragon Film Awards

- Nomination - Best Actress - Kim Min-hee
- Nomination - Best Supporting Actor - Jo Sung-ha

2012 Korean Culture and Entertainment Awards

- Excellence Award, Actor in a Film - Jo Sung-ha

2012 Women in Film Korea Awards

- Woman Filmmaker of the Year - Byun Young-joo
