= Jo Sung-ha =

South Korean actor (born 1966)

- Born: August 8, 1966 (age 60); Ulsan, South Korea
- Other name: Cho Seong-ha
- Education: Seoul Institute of the Arts – Theater
- Occupation: Actor
- Years active: 1996–present
- Agent: C-JeS Entertainment
- Children: 2

Korean name
- Hangul: 조성하
- Hanja: 趙城何
- RR: Jo Seongha
- MR: Cho Sŏngha

Jo Sung-ha (Korean: 조성하; born August 8, 1966) is a South Korean actor. He is best known for his supporting roles in The Yellow Sea (2010), Helpless (2012), and Korean Peninsula (2012) and The K2 (2016).

== Filmography ==
=== Film ===
Year	Title	Role
1997	Insh'allah	
2001	Volcano High	Korean language teacher
2004	Spider Forest	Choi Jong-pil
2004	A Smile	Flight instructor
2005	Feathers in the Wind	Uncle
2005	Never to Lose	President Jang
2005	The Peter Pan Formula	Coach Park
2006	The Art of Fighting	Dong-soo
2006	Running Wild	Trial judge
2006	Bewitching Attraction	Park Seok-ho
2006	The Bad Utterances	PE teacher
2006	Fly, Daddy, Fly	Cha Joo-oh
2006	Cinderella	Hyeon-su's father
2007	The Elephant on the Bike	Brother-in-law
2007	Who's That Knocking at My Door?	Choi Byung-chul
2008	My Friend & His Wife	Department head
2009	Short! Short! Short! 2009: Show Me the Money (short film: "Fastest Man in the World")	
2009	The Executioner	Yong-doo
2010	Bloody Innocent	Detective Kang
2010	Dear Music: That is, Their Fantasy; Heading for the Sea	
2010	She Came From	Dong-yeon
2010	The Recipe	Park Min / Park Gu
2010	The Yellow Sea	Tae-won
2011	Bleak Night	Ki-tae's father
2011	Always	Section chief Choi
2011	Sunday Punch	Company president Choi
2012	Helpless	Kim Jong-geun
2012	A Millionaire on the Run	Managing director Han
2012	R2B: Return to Base	Brigadier General Choi Byeong-gil
2012	Circle of Crime - Director's Cut	Don Il-ho
2013	Pluto	Chief detective Park
2013	Commitment	Colonel Moon Sang-chul
2013	The Suspect	NIS director Kim Seok-ho
2015	Himalaya	Lee Dong-gyu
2020	Time to Hunt	Bong-sik / Bong-soo (cameo)
2022	Serve the People	Division commander
2022	Transaction Complete	
2022	The Night Owl	Young Eui-jeong

=== Television series ===
Year	Title	Role	Notes/Ref.
1999	Happy Together		
2003	I'll Love You Until Death		
2005	HDTV Literature	Major General Kim	Episode "The Flag"
2006	Hwang Jini	Eom-soo	
2007	Drama City	Kim Mu-sa	Episode "North Koreans to Come Out of Hiding"
2008	The Great King, Sejong	Yi Soo	
2008	Wife and Woman	Seo Wook-hyun	
2010	The Slave Hunters	Minister Lee Jae-joon	Cameo
2010	Sungkyunkwan Scandal	King Jeongjo	
2010	Flames of Desire	Kim Young-joon	
2011	My Princess	Park Dong-jae's father	Cameo
2011	Paradise Ranch	Park Jin-young's father	
2011	Romance Town	Hwang Yong	
2011	Drama Special Series – "White Christmas"	Show host	Cameo
2011	Living in Style		Cameo
2012	Korean Peninsula	Chief Presidential Secretary Park Do-myung	
2012	Read My Lips		Cameo
2012	KBS Drama Special	Park Bu-dong	Episode "The Whereabouts of Noh Sook-ja"
2012	The Innocent Man	Dr. Seok Min-hyuk	
2013	Iris II: New Generation	President Ha Seung-jin	
2013	Gu Family Book	Dam Pyeong-joon	
2013	Wang's Family	Go Min-joong	
2015	Splendid Politics	Kang Joo-sun	
2016	Local Hero	Im Tae-ho	
2016	The K2	Jang Se-joon	
2017	Save Me	Baek Jung-ki	
2017	Hospital Ship	Song Jae-joon	Guest, episode 21 and 23-24
2017	A Korean Odyssey	Man in the movie	Cameo, episode 5
2018	100 Days My Prince	Kim Cha-eon	
2018	Ms. Hammurabi	Creative writing professor	Cameo, episode 13
2019	Arthdal Chronicles	Hae Mi-hol	
2019	Flower Crew: Joseon Marriage Agency	King	Guest, episode 1-2
2020	Memorist	Lee Shin-woong	
2020	Delayed Justice	Jo Ki-soo	
2021	Navillera	Lee Moo-young	
2021	Lovers of the Red Sky	King Seongjo	
2022	Adamas	Lee Chang-woo	
2023	Agency	Choi Chang-su	
2023	Our Blooming Youth	Han Jung-eon	
2025	Queen Mantis	Jung-ho	
2026	Sword & Silence	Koo Geun-moo	

=== Variety show ===
Year	Title	Notes
2013	A Story Within A Story Event, Person, Phenomena	Host

=== Web shows ===
Year	Title	Role	Notes	Ref.
2022	SNL Korea	Host	Season 2 – Episode 18	

== Theater ==
Year	Title	Role
1991	West Side Story	
1994	Man of La Mancha	Don Quixote
2007	Aishiteru	Kimura
2014	Priscilla, Queen of the Desert	Bernadette

== Awards and nominations ==
Year	Award	Category	Nominated work	Result
2011	48th Grand Bell Awards	Best Supporting Actor	The Yellow Sea	Won
2011	32nd Blue Dragon Film Awards	Best Supporting Actor	The Yellow Sea	Nominated
2011	KBS Drama Awards	Best Supporting Actor	Romance Town	Nominated
2012	16th Puchon International Fantastic Film Festival	It Star Award	—N/a	Won
2012	20th Korean Culture and Entertainment Awards	Excellence Award, Actor in a Film	Helpless	Won
2012	21st Buil Film Awards	Best Supporting Actor	Helpless	Nominated
2012	33rd Blue Dragon Film Awards	Best Supporting Actor	Helpless	Nominated
2013	KBS Drama Awards	Excellence Award, Actor in a Serial Drama	Wang's Family	Won
2014	50th Baeksang Arts Awards	Best Supporting Actor	The Suspect	Nominated
2021	SBS Drama Awards	Best Supporting Actor in a Mini-Series Genre/Fantasy Drama	Lovers of the Red Sky	Nominated
