= Brave Story =

Novel by Miyuki Miyabe

- Cover of English translation of Brave Story as published by Viz Media and illustrated by Dan May

ブレイブ・ストーリー (Bureibu Sutōrī)
- Genre: Adventure; Fantasy
- Novel series
- Written by: Miyuki Miyabe
- Published by: Kadokawa Shoten
- English publisher: NA/UK: Viz Media
- Imprint: Viz Media (English hardback); Haikasoru (English paperback)
- Original run: August 11, 1999 – February 13, 2001
- Manga
- Written by: Miyuki Miyabe
- Illustrated by: Yōichirō Ono
- Published by: Shinchōsha
- English publisher: NA/UK: Tokyopop
- Magazine: Weekly Comic Bunch
- Original run: April 9, 2004 – May 9, 2008
- Volumes: 20
- Video game

Brave Story: New Traveler
- Developer: Game Republic
- Publisher: JP: Sony Computer Entertainment; NA: Xseed Games
- Genre: Role-playing video game
- Platform: PlayStation Portable
- Released: JP: July 6, 2006; NA: July 31, 2007
- Video game

Brave Story: My Dreams and Wishes
- Publisher: Namco Bandai
- Genre: Adventure
- Platform: Nintendo DS
- Released: JP: July 6, 2006
- Video game

Brave Story: Wataru's Adventure
- Publisher: Sony Computer Entertainment
- Genre: Adventure
- Platform: PlayStation 2
- Released: JP: July 6, 2006
- Anime film
- Directed by: Koichi Chigira
- Produced by: Daisuke Sekiguchi; Hiroyoshi Koiwai; Koji Kajita
- Written by: Ichirō Ōkouchi
- Music by: Juno Reactor
- Studio: Gonzo
- Licensed by: AUS: Madman Entertainment; UK: Optimum Releasing
- Released: July 8, 2006
- Runtime: 112 minutes

Brave Story (Japanese: ブレイブ・ストーリー, Hepburn: Bureibu Sutōrī) is a Japanese fantasy novel written by Miyuki Miyabe. It was serialized in various regional newspapers between November 11, 1999, and February 13, 2001, before being published in two hardcover volumes by Kadokawa Shoten. Brave Story has spawned into a substantial media franchise. The novel was adapted into a manga by Yoichiro Ono and Miyabe herself, who wrote the new story for the manga, which was serialised in Shinchosha's Weekly Comic Bunch. Shinchosha collected the chapters of Brave Story in twenty tankōbon volumes and released them between April 2004 and May 2008. In the manga version Wataru is slightly older and already in high school.

In 2006 the novel was re-released in two new editions, a three-volume softcover version of the earlier hardcover release intended for mature readers and a light novel version marketed for younger readers. These were intended to create interest in the animated film adaption by Gonzo released in Japan by Warner Bros. in July 2006. The film was nominated for "Animation of the Year" at the 2007 Japanese Academy Awards and also released on home video in Australia, the United Kingdom, France, Taiwan and Germany.

The novel was loosely adapted into three video games: Sony Computer Entertainment's PSP game Brave Story: New Traveler, Namco Bandai's Nintendo DS game Brave Story: My Dreams and Wishes, and Sony Computer Entertainment's PlayStation 2 game Brave Story: Wataru's Adventure.

== Plot ==
=== Novel ===
Wataru Mitani is a quiet and unassuming fifth grader in Japan. A new student called Mitsuru Ashikawa begins attending Wataru's school, though he is in a different class. There are also rumors circulating about the Daimatsu building, an empty, unfinished building near Wataru's school: witnesses claimed to have seen a ghost wandering behind the building's blue tarps. One day after school, while out with his uncle, Wataru witnesses an old man entering the abandoned building. Wataru follows him into the building and stumbles into the strange world of Vision. In Vision, he is told that the portal he crossed, called the Porta Nectere, opens only once every ten years for ninety days. People from his world are strictly forbidden to enter Vision unless they obtain the status of Traveler from "the gatekeeper". Unfortunately, he is also told he will forget everything of his visit. Upon re-entering the Porta Nectere, his uncle wakens him and he finds that Vision was a dream; Wataru supposedly fell from the stairs of the Daimatsu building. Wataru's uncle brings Wataru home only to discover a terrible truth: the boy's parents are divorcing and his father is leaving with his mistress, leaving his wife and Wataru behind. Both Wataru and his mother are shocked, and to add to Wataru's stress, he finds his memories of Vision slipping away. Later, Wataru's father's lover confronts Wataru's mother over who Wataru's father really loves. After this encounter, Wataru's mother attempts suicide by leaving on the gas in the house. Mitsuru visits him, warns him of the gas, and tells him to go to Vision if he wants to change his fate. Wataru struggles to remember, but he finally goes to the Daimatsu building to cross the portal to Vision. Thus, Wataru's journey in Vision begins.

When he arrives in Vision, Wataru meets an old man who calls himself the Wayfinder. He tells Wataru what he must do to change his destiny: Wataru has to collect five gemstones to go to the Tower of Destiny, where the Goddess grants each Traveler one wish. Each stone has a different quality: charity, bravery, faith, grace, and the power of darkness and light. Wataru encounters friends and foes during his adventures, and he ultimately comes to terms with the nature of himself.

=== Manga ===
While basic plot of Novel and Manga don't differ, some of the details are changed. E.g. Kaori Matsushima is a secondary character with little connection to the plot in the novel while she is made another License-holder in the manga. It is also revealed that she is connected to Matsushima Shrine which owns Daimatsu building and that building is source to her family's financial trouble.

== Production ==
March 10, 2006, Gonzo announced the establishment of a charity enterprise "Our Brave Fund". ¥10 for every box office ticket purchased for the Brave Story film is donated to United Nations Children's Fund, which aims to "assist children infected with HIV and its repercussions in Asian and African nations, particularly children in the Republic of Malawi" with the funds. The production cost of the movie was estimated to be one billion yen.

Manga artist Yoichiro Ono comments that although he has kept his drawing style as close as he could to boys' manga, the story's is aimed at an adult audience and resulted in the first volume of the manga being "a lot more serious than it ended up being... and more mature".

== Media ==
=== Novel ===
Miyuki Miyabe wrote and illustrated Brave Story and Kadokawa Shoten released both volumes of the novel March 3, 2003. Kadokawa Shoten released a special volume April 7, 2003 and an official guide book July 3, 2006. The English-language version of the novel is licensed by Viz Media. August 14, 2007, Viz Media released the novel as an 824-page book. It was translated into English by Alexander O. Smith. The novel is to be re-issued by Viz Media under its imprint, Haikasoru.

=== Manga ===
The manga adaptation of Brave Story, written by Miyuki Miyabe and illustrated by Yoichiro Ono, came about after the novel won the Batchelder Award. The manga serialization in Shinchosha's seinen magazine (aimed at young adults) Weekly Comic Bunch ended March 14, 2008. Shinchosha collected the individual chapters into 20 tankōbon volumes, and released them between April 9, 2004, and May 9, 2008. Tokyopop licensed the manga for an English-language release in North America. The English print of the manga had all the sound effects in the Japanese language only with no English captions. The first Brave Story volume was published on June 12, 2007. Brave Story is also licensed in France by Kurokawa.

=== Film ===
An animated film adaptation of Brave Story was produced by Gonzo. Directed by Koichi Chigira and produced by Daisuke Sekiguchi, Hiroyoshi Koiwai and Koji Kajita, Warner Bros. released it in Japanese cinemas July 8, 2006. Warner Bros.handled worldwide distribution of the Brave Story movie. Warner Bros. announced its planned release of Brave Story on DVD, Blu-ray, HD DVD and UMD November 12, 2006. The movie was licensed in Australia by Madman Entertainment, in the United Kingdom by Optimum Releasing, in France by Kaze and in Germany by Anime-Virtual. Juno Reactor composed the soundtrack for Brave Story.

Brave Story was showcased by Pony Canyon during the 2007 American Film Market. Pony Canyon promoted Brave Story along with Umizaru 2: Test of Trust at the 2008 American Film Market. Optimum Releasing released the film in the United Kingdom on September 8, 2008. The movie's ending theme was "Ketsui no Asa ni" (決意の朝に, lit. 'The Morning with Determination') by Aqua Timez.

==== Cast ====
Character	Japanese	English
Wataru Mitani	Takako Matsu	Mona Marshall
Mysterious Girl	Ayako Kawasumi	Stephanie Sheh
Meena	Chiwa Saito	Sherry Lynn
Mitsuru Ashikawa	Eiji Wentz	Mona Marshall
Jozo	Satomi Koorogi	
Monk Lau	Shirō Itō	Michael Sorich
Kutz	Takako Tokiwa	Cindy Robinson
Kee Keema	Yo Oizumi	Steve Kramer
Princess Suaty	Akiko Yajima	Dorothy Elias-Fahn
Ishioka	Akira Ishida	
Dog Highlander	Atsushi Tsutsumishita	
Aya Ashikawa	Kanon Nagashima	Cindy Robinson
Akira Mitsuya	Katsumi Takahashi	Kirk Thornton
Onba	Kirin Kiki	
Katsumi	Mihoko Abukawa	Wendee Lee
Goddess of Destiny	Miki Imai	Dorothy Elias-Fahn
Toron	Natsuhiko Kyogoku	Joe Cappelletti
Yunababa	Rie Shibata	
Ogawa	Saori Ito	
Bishop Daimon	Taro Ishida	Terrence Stone
Young Bishop	Toshiyuki Itakura	Liam O'Brien
Kuniko Mitsuya	Yoshiko Tanaka	

=== Games ===
Sony Computer Entertainment released a role-playing game, Brave Story: New Traveler on PlayStation Portable in Japan July 6, 2006. In United States, Xseed Games released the game July 31, 2007. Both were developed by Game Republic. July 6, 2006, Namco Bandai released an adventure Nintendo DS game, called Brave Story: My Dreams and Wishes (ブレイブ·ストーリー ボクのキオクとネガイ, Bureibu Stōrī: Boku no Kioku to Negai). Sony Computer Entertainment released a PlayStation 2 game, Brave Story: Wataru's Adventure (ブレイブ·ストーリー ワタルの冒険, Bureibu Stōrī: Wataru no Bouken) July 6, 2006.

=== Soundtracks ===
On July 24, 1996, Avex Trax released a soundtrack of Brave Story, sung by TRF using the lyrics of Tetsuya Komuro. July 5, 2006, Sony Music Entertainment released an animation soundtrack CD for Brave Story; Juno Reactor composed the songs. November 29, 2006, Avex Trax released a Brave Story soundtrack, which featured lyrics by Tetsuya Komuro and Takahiro Maeda, and sung by TRF. Universal Music released another soundtrack CD of Brave Story September 3, 2008, with lyrics by Yuki Sakurai and sung by Rice.

== Reception ==
=== Novel ===
Viz Media was awarded the Batchelder Award in 2008 for publishing Brave Story novel. Matt Paddock from Game Vortex ponders on the "family dynamics and the pain of divorce or marital dysfunction is still so great in Japan that readers there are transfixed by this kind of stuff." He criticizes Miyabe for not introducing the "fantasy world much earlier to capture the imagination of her readers". Katherine Dacey of Pop Culture Shock describes "Miyabe's dark fantasy" as "a Frankenbook, stitched together from pieces of EverQuest, Guin Saga, Harry Potter, The Lord of the Rings, Star Wars, and The Wizard of Oz to create an entertaining, surprisingly adult adventure story whose seams sometime show."

=== Film ===
The Brave Story film was nominated for "Animation of the Year" at the 2007 Japanese Academy Awards. John Li from MovieXclusive commends the film for its animation, saying "pleasing soft pastel colors and the occasional computer animation is still refreshing and pleasant to look at". Mark Schilling of The Japan Times compares Wataru to Doraemon's Nobita. He compares "the "quest for five jewels" motif" to the Dragon Ball series and The Chronicles of Narnia. John Smith from Impulse Gamer commends the film for its "beautiful animation techniques and some great sound sequences". Mania.com's Chris Beveridge commends the Blu-ray Disc version of Brave Story for being "very expansive in its use of the surround channels during some of the action sequences". He also commends the film for its visual quality saying, "on our 50" set at 720p, the only "problems" I could find was that I had to be six inches (152 mm) from the screen and looking at the pixels to see some of the shiftiness in the animation in the scenes where dark blues and blacks mix". Mania.com's Dani Moure compares the film's "old-fashioned" character designs to Studio Ghibli's. Anime News Network's Brian Hanson criticises the film as "being one of the worst-looking big-budget anime films of recent memory, the story is a mash of bizarre coincidences held together haphazardly by forced and annoying bouts of exposition, with irritating and one-dimensional characters chirping throughout".

Erkael of the French website Manga News gave the anime film 18 out of 20, and describes it as "Brave Story is a real phenomenon in Japan, in addition to the film which required more than four long years of work, This superb film, from the Gonzo studio, in itself is a guarantee of quality. The quest for sacred gems is only a pretext to explore this vast world and develop the character who will become aware of the suffering of others once he has stopped focusing on his own. Indeed the film is deeper than it seems, it goes beyond a simple Heroic Fantasy adventure, it encourages reflection and knows how to be very touching on many occasions. In short, this film is a masterpiece to own, it is already a great classic!"

=== Manga ===
The Manga adaption of Brave Story was ranked fifth on an About.com poll for the best shōnen manga of 2007. A.E. Sparrow from IGN commends Brave Story manga for Yochiro Ono's artwork and he compares them to "some of the more recent manhwa (Korean) titles that have also come out of the Tokyopop camp". Mania.com's Nadia Oxford comments that the " unforgiving landscape" of the fantasy world "Vision" "seems to somehow reflect the mental state of its inhabitants". Scott Campbell from ActiveAnime commends the manga for its "detailed art and involving story". Snow Wildsmith from Teenreads commends Miyabe's "talent for switching between reality and fantasy, action and pathos, humor and seriousness, which helps make her story both more interesting and more believable". Anime News Network's Carlo Santos criticises the manga for its opening plotline by saying it is a "remarkably bland rendition of the "young hero sucked into alternate world" formula, and it's easy to mistake this at first for some kind of lame-duck Rayearth / Twelve Kingdoms clone". Katherine Dacey of Pop Culture Shock comments on Brave Story "distinguishes itself from dozens of similar series by fleshing out Wataru's personal life. Wataru is no swaggering shonen stereotype: he's insecure, hesitant, and crushed to learn that his dream girl has the hots for someone else." She also commends Wataru's parents sudden divorce "leaving Wataru to comfort his dumbfounded and grief-stricken mother while coming to terms with his own sense of loss. These scenes add an unexpected emotional depth to the story, demonstrating Wataru's essential decency while providing him with a powerful motive for saving the world: he loves his mother".

=== Games ===
Brave Story: New Traveler was generally well received by critics earning aggregated scores of 76% from Metacritic and 79% from GameRankings. Joe Dodson of GameSpot commends the game for its visual and sound effects but criticises its "homogenous and never-ending" monsters. GamePro commends the game for "vibrant graphics, small load times and solid presentation on the whole" but criticises it for "some too-familiar aspects of story and gameplay, story may be too "kiddy" for some." Louis Bedigian of GameZone commends the game's graphics saying that the game "pays homage to the 3D Final Fantasy games". Matt Paddock from Game Vortex commends the game on its faithful translation by saying, "if any of the Harry Potter books had been translated as faithfully, the game versions of Rowling's work would be selling gold and platinum right now". GameFAQs's Kashell Triumph commends the game's character designs, describing them as, "well designed, detailed, expressive, and fluid". Greg Miller at IGN criticises the game for having "a set of exactly the same events -- random battles, dungeon, random battles, boss". GameSpy's Steve Steinberg criticises the game for its first three hours of gameplay as it shows "very slowly and methodically—the basics of a generic and less-than-compelling game".
