= List of Horimiya episodes =

Episodes of Japanese anime series

Horimiya's title icon.

Horimiya is an anime television series based on Daisuke Hagiwara's adaptation of Hero's manga series Hori-san to Miyamura-kun. It was announced on September 17, 2020. The story follows the lives of two high school students.The series was animated by CloverWorks and directed by Masashi Ishihama, with Takao Yoshioka handling series' composition, Haruko Iizuka designing the characters, and Masaru Yokoyama composing the series' music. It aired from January 10 to April 4, 2021, on Tokyo MX and other channels. (Note: Tokyo MX listed the series premiere at 24:30 on January 9, 2021, which is January 10 at 12:30 a.m.)

The anime is licensed by Funimation, which licensed the series and streamed it on its website in North America, the British Isles, Mexico, and Brazil, in Europe through Wakanim, and in Australia and New Zealand through AnimeLab. On February 5, 2021, Funimation announced that the series would be receiving an English dub, which premiered the next day. Following Sony's acquisition of Crunchyroll, the series was moved to Crunchyroll. Medialink has licensed the series in Southeast Asia and South Asia, and streamed it on Bilibili only in Southeast Asia. The company later began streaming the first episode on their Ani-One YouTube channel for a limited time, from February 13 to March 15, 2021. They also licensed the anime to Animax Asia for TV airing.

A second anime series, titled Horimiya: Piece, (Note: Alternatively titled as Horimiya: The Missing Pieces) was announced at AnimeJapan on March 25, 2023. It features stories from the manga that were not adapted in the previous anime. The series aired from July 1 to September 23, 2023.

== Episodes ==
=== Season 1 (2021) ===
No.	Title (Note: All English titles are taken from Funimation.)	Directed by	Written by	Original release date
1	"A Tiny Happenstance"; Transliteration: "Hon no, Sasaina Kikkake de." (Japanese: ほんの、ささいなきっかけで。)	Masashi Ishihama	Takao Yoshioka	January 10, 2021
Kyoko Hori, the most popular girl in her class, dresses plainly at home and takes care of housework. One day, Izumi Miyamura, the class loner, discovers her secret when he escorts her younger brother, Sota, home from a nosebleed. Hori discovers that Miyamura wears piercings outside of school and has tattoos, but the two decide to keep each others' secrets. They develop a close bond and friendship with each other as Miyamura continues to visit to play with Sota. During this time, Miyamura accidentally exposes his true appearance in front of Yoshikawa on his way to help Hori buy eggs during a flash sale. Meanwhile, Toru Ishikawa, a classmate, befriends Miyamura in spite of his feelings for Hori and tells him that he plans on confessing to her. Miyamura puts distance between himself and Hori until she confronts him, upset that he had avoided her to protect her reputation. The two make up, with Hori explaining she rejected Ishikawa.
2	"You Wear More Than One Face"; Transliteration: "Kao wa, Hitotsu Dake ja nai." (Japanese: 顔は、ひとつだけじゃない。)	Yoshiko Okuda	Chiaki Nagai	January 17, 2021
While talking to her mother, Hori realizes she doesn't know Miyamura's first name and goes through several schemes to learn it indirectly, until Miyamura finally reveals it to her. At school, the student council asks Hori with help on their paperwork. They later accuse her of losing the budget report, but Miyamura proves her innocence by revealing one of the members, Remi, had accidentally dropped it when she bumped into him (as well as headbutting the president, Sengoku). They apologize, while Hori reveals she helped the student council out of guilt for bullying Sengoku in their childhood. As the students begin their third year, Miyamura gives Hori a CD for her birthday.
3	"That's Why It's Okay"; Transliteration: "Da Kara, Daijōbu." (Japanese: だから、大丈夫。)	Ryō Kodama	Takao Yoshioka	January 24, 2021
As Miyamura recalls his dark past, always being alone at school, for a class project, Hori, Ishikawa, and Yoshikawa casually form a group with him, and he realizes he has them to call his friends. He confides in Ishikawa, who confirms their friendship. The next day, Remi jokingly suggests to Hori that she is considering dating Miyamura, while Hori becomes defensive over him. After school, Hori and Miyamura compare their hands, and Hori nearly confesses her feelings to him. When Ishikawa confronts Miyamura about Hori, Miyamura denies that she has feelings for him, and they get into an altercation. The two apologize, while Miyamura reveals to Yoshikawa that Hori was the cause of their fight.
4	"Everybody Loves Somebody"; Transliteration: "Dare mo, Dare ka ga Suki Nanda." (Japanese: 誰も、誰かが好きなんだ。)	Akihisa Shibata	Takao Yoshioka	January 31, 2021
As summer arrives, Sakura falls in love with Ishikawa when he helps her pick up papers she scattered. Hori gives Miyamura ice cream, which he shares with Ishikawa and Sengoku. Hori and Miyamura lose a game among their friends and they are punished to buying drinks for them, with Ishikawa misunderstanding what happened between them. After school, Hori learns that Miyamura only gets flustered and abrasive when talking to Shindo, his middle school classmate. While out in town, she and Ishikawa meet Shindo. Later, Hori falls ill, and Miyamura nurses her, learning more about the loneliness she experiences in the process. Miyamura ends up confessing his feelings for her.
5	"I Can't Say It Out Loud"; Transliteration: "Sore wa, Ienai Koto." (Japanese: それは、言えないこと。)	Yukiko Imai	Sawako Hirabayashi	February 7, 2021
Sota reports that he saw Miyamura with another girl, unaware that she is Shindo's girlfriend, Chika. Hori becomes upset and avoids Miyamura, culminating in her throwing her textbook at him. When Miyamura arrives at her home to return the textbook, the two apologize to each other. Hori allows Miyamura to explain, but they are interrupted by her father, Kyosuke. Hori confirms Miyamura is her boyfriend, and they begin dating. Ishikawa falls into a slump learning about this but affirms Miyamura they are still friends. Meanwhile, Sakura confides in Remi about her crush on Ishikawa, feeling she is unattractive compared to her, but Remi stands up for her, giving her encouragement.
6	"This Summer's Going to Be a Hot One" (Note: The title is written as 今年の夏は、暑いから。 (using kanji) on the website and 今年の夏は、あついから。 (using hiragana) in the episode.); Transliteration: "Kotoshi no Natsu wa, Atsui Kara." (Japanese: 今年の夏は、暑いから。)	Shinobu Sasaki	Takao Yoshioka	February 14, 2021
The other students discover Hori and Miyamura are dating after Miyamura spends the night at her house. Concerned about how his reputation is affecting hers, he decides to cut his hair and stop wearing glasses. After school, while Shindo shares candy with Hori and Miyamura, Miyamura kisses Hori for the first time. Later, Miyamura's new look draws attention from the girls and Honoka Sawada, a first-year student who declares him her rival for Hori's affections. Miyamura learns that Sawada is his next-door neighbor whose brother died a year ago, and he becomes more sympathetic to her situation, developing his own relationship with her.
7	"You're Here, I'm Here"; Transliteration: "Kimi ga Ite, Boku ga Ite." (Japanese: 君がいて、僕がいて。)	Yoshiko Okuda	Chiaki Nagai	February 21, 2021
Ishikawa lends Sakura his jersey to hide a stain, and Sakura bakes cookies as thanks. Jealous, Yuki asks Miyamura for help on baking cupcakes, and though they become burnt, Ishikawa encourages her to bake more. Miyamura goes to Hokkaido for five days to attend a funeral and Hori anxiously waits for him to return, especially when his phone runs out of battery. On the day he returns, they tearfully embrace. The girls suggest Hori act docile around Miyamura by pretending she is scared during a horror movie, but she ends up scaring Miyamura. Hori becomes embarrassed, but Miyamura reminds her he loves her for who she is. Growing intimate, he spends the night at her house. On the next day, Hori overhears Miyamura comforting Sota, who was afraid that Miyamura would take his sister away from him.
8	"The Truth Deception Reveals"; Transliteration: "Itsuwaru Koto de, Mieru Mono." (Japanese: 偽ることで、見えるもの。)	Ryō Kodama	Sawako Hirabayashi	February 28, 2021
Miyamura has a dream where he meets his younger self and assures himself he'll meet his friends someday. Remi reminisces on her relationship with Sengoku on the day they met and when Sengoku confessed to her. Miyamura discovers Hori's masochistic side, as she constantly persuades him to hit or yell at her, which he forces himself to do. Meanwhile, Yoshikawa gets asked out by Akane Yanagi, a student from another class, and asks her friends for help who suggest Toru act as her boyfriend. Yoshikawa declines Yanagi's confession but despite that, the group accepts Yanagi into their group.
9	"It's Hard, but Not Impossible"; Transliteration: "Muzukashii Kedo, Muri ja nai." (Japanese: 難しいけど、無理じゃない。)	Tadahito Matsubayashi	Takao Yoshioka	March 7, 2021
Miyamura runs into an old classmate from middle school, Tanihara, who used to bully him, and proceeds to talk down to him some more until he and his friend are beat up by Hori. She continues to try and pressure Miyamura to be more rough with her, which he reluctantly gives into and accidentally scares Tanihara and his friends. Miyamura meets Mizouchi, who is initially cold to him due to having a crush on Hori, but the two are able to start getting closer together. Tanihara has a dream where he reflects on an incident from the past when he blamed Miyamura for the death of their school's rabbits. He visits him at his cake shop, where he's received warmly and promises to return; he internally apologizes for his actions. Later, Hori and Miyamura reflect on their middle school days, as Miyamura is now able to look back on it more fondly after getting closer with everyone.
10	"Until the Snow Melts"; Transliteration: "Itsuka, Yuki ga Tokeru Made." (Japanese: いつか、雪が溶けるまで。)	Yōsuke Yamamoto	Sawako Hirabayashi	March 14, 2021
Hori gets jealous over how close Miyamura is with Tanihara, Shindo and the other guys. Sakura becomes devastated when she learns about Ishikawa and Yuki supposedly dating, while Yuki retreats into herself unsure how to be honest with her feelings for him. Ishikawa tells her about Sakura confessing to him, but without asking for an answer. He proceeds to cheer Yuki up talking about all the things he loves about snow ("yuki") and how excited they are for it to arrive. Sengoku later consoles the grieving Sakura over her rejection.
11	"It May Seem Like Hate"; Transliteration: "Kirai Kirai mo, Ura ga Aru." (Japanese: 嫌い嫌いも、ウラがある。)	Yasuo Ejima	Chiaki Nagai	March 21, 2021
After the group learns Iura has a sister, the boys try to get closer together with Yanagi. Miyamura's initially worried about losing his relationships to the guys, but develops a close bond with Yanagi too. Sawada starts to get more comfortable around the boys, but still has trouble around the loud and annoying Iura. After he silently helps her one day (unaware he's sick), she gets worried he hates her, but he's back to his usual self the next day. Iura's sister, Motoko, is discouraged after her teacher claims she won't be able to get into her high school of choice, but Iura gives her encouragement. On his request, Hori helps to tutor her as they talk to each other. The siblings each internally hope the other doesn't actually hate them.
12	"Hitherto, and Forevermore"; Transliteration: "Kore Made mo, Soshite Kore Kara mo." (Japanese: これまでも、そしてこれからも。)	Ryō Kodama, Fumiaki Kataoka, Masashi Ishihama	Chiaki Nagai	March 28, 2021
Hori asks Miyamura to join for Christmas dinner, though he says he's unable to due to work, to Sota and Kyosuke's disappointment. Toru talks to Sengoku and Iura about his feelings for Yuki, and how despite technically not dating, he feels comfortable with their current relationship. Later, she visits his house to play together, where they grow increasingly anxious and embarrassed, even moreso being messed with by the Ishikawa house caretaker, Yashiro. Sengoku is terrified to visit Remi due to his fear of bugs. Hori thinks about what will happen after they graduate high school. On Christmas, each of the characters celebrate relaxing with their family and loved ones. Miyamura visits the Hori household for a short while before leaving for work. On the walk home, Hori tells him that she wants to stay with him even after they graduate, which he responds saying they should get married. The two proceed to spend New Year's together, as they think about their future.
13	"I Would Gift You the Sky"; Transliteration: "Semete, Kono Ōzora o." (Japanese: せめて、この大空を。)	Masashi Ishihama	Takao Yoshioka	April 4, 2021
As the end of the school year approaches, the students clean out their lockers. Remi wants to take a trip with the rest of her friends, but worries about the potential of them leaving her in the future, which they reassure her they'll all remain friends. Miyamura reflects on what his and the others' school life would've been like if he hadn't inadvertently met Hori. At the graduation ceremony, Miyamura accidentally sneezes causing a ruckus during Sengoku's speech. He then talks to his past self declaring that he won't look away from what he used to be anymore. Sawada says her goodbyes to Hori, while Sakura says her thanks to Ishikawa. Yanagi approaches Yuki about the idea of their group all going out for a trip sometime. Kyosuke shows up to mess with Miyamura and Hori, and Motoko appears to walk Iura home and sees her brother's different personality in school. Miyamura and Hori head out together, as he thinks about all the things he loves about Hori, all she's done to help him come out of his shell, and what he can do to show her his thanks.

=== Horimiya: The Missing Pieces ===
No.	Title (Note: All English titles are taken from Crunchyroll.)	Directed by	Written by	Original release date
1	"Class Trip"; Transliteration: "Shūgakuryokō" (Japanese: 修学旅行)	Masashi Ishihama	Takao Yoshioka	July 1, 2023
2	"Cooking Class"; Transliteration: "Chōri Jisshū" (Japanese: 調理実習)	Akihisa Shibata	Chiaki Nagai	July 8, 2023
3	"Sports Day"; Transliteration: "Taiikusai" (Japanese: 体育祭)	Kenjirou Okada	Sawako Hirabayashi	July 15, 2023
4	"Hori Kotatsu" (Japanese: 堀こたつ)	Ryō Kodama	Takao Yoshioka	July 22, 2023
5	"Iura" (Japanese: 井浦)	Yasuo Ejima	Chiaki Nagai	July 29, 2023
6	"Sleepover"; Transliteration: "Otomarikai" (Japanese: お泊り会)	Shōgo Ono, Yui Ikari	Sawako Hirabayashi	August 5, 2023
7	"Friends"; Transliteration: "Tomodachi" (Japanese: 友達)	Masashi Ishihama	Takao Yoshioka	August 12, 2023
8	"Yanagi-kun" (Japanese: 柳くん)	Kakushi Ifuku	Chiaki Nagai	August 19, 2023
9	"Teacher"; Transliteration: "Sensei" (Japanese: 先生)	Jun Takahashi	Sawako Hirabayashi	August 26, 2023
10	"Jealousy"; Transliteration: "Yakimochi" (Japanese: やきもち)	Akihisa Shibata	Takao Yoshioka	September 2, 2023
11	"Chocolate"; Transliteration: "Chokorēto" (Japanese: チョコレート)	Tsurumi Mukōyama	Chiaki Nagai	September 9, 2023
12	"The Hori House"; Transliteration: "Hori-ke" (Japanese: 堀家)	Yasuo Ejima	Sawako Hirabayashi	September 16, 2023
13	"Graduation"; Transliteration: "Sotsugyō" (Japanese: 卒業)	Masashi Ishihama	Takao Yoshioka	September 23, 2023
