= Horimiya =

Japanese manga series

- First tankōbon volume cover of Horimiya, featuring Izumi Miyamura (left) and Kyouko Hori (right)

ホリミヤ
- Genre: Romantic comedy
- Manga
- Written by: Hero
- Illustrated by: Daisuke Hagiwara
- Published by: Square Enix
- English publisher: Yen Press
- Imprint: GFantasy Comics
- Magazine: Monthly GFantasy
- Original run: October 18, 2011 – March 18, 2021
- Volumes: 17
- Anime television series
- Horimiya (2021); Horimiya: The Missing Pieces (2023)
- icon

Horimiya (Japanese: ホリミヤ) is a Japanese manga series written by Hero and illustrated by Daisuke Hagiwara. It is an adaptation of the original Hori-san to Miyamura-kun (Note: Japanese: 堀さんと宮村くん, Hepburn: Hori-san to Miyamura-kun) webcomic written and illustrated by Hero. The manga was serialized with 16 tankōbon volumes in Monthly GFantasy, published by Square Enix. The series is licensed in English by Yen Press. Set on interception of the lives of two high school students, the popular and seemingly perfect Kyouko Hori, and the quiet, gloomy Izumi Miyamura, who discover each other's secret which is their hidden selves and fall in love.

A 13-episode anime television series adaptation was produced by CloverWorks and aired from January to April 2021. A 13-episode sequel titled Horimiya: The Missing Pieces building the relationships between the characters and recapping moments in the first season aired from July to September 2023.

== Plot ==
The story focuses on the growing relationship between two high school students, Izumi Miyamura and Kyouko Hori. Both of which are completely different people outside of school. Miyamura, despite his bookish-otaku appearance, is not book smart. Miyamura is a "stereotypical" bad boy with many piercings and tattoos. Meanwhile, Hori, who despite her ostentatious appearance, excels in academics, and has a family-loving character.

== Production ==
Beginning October 2011, Daisuke Hagiwara started collaborating with Hero on a spin-off of the latter's romantic comedy webcomic Hori-san to Miyamura-kun, titled Horimiya. Hagiwara worked as the artist, while Hero continued writing the story.

== Media ==
=== Manga ===
The Horimiya manga, illustrated by Daisuke Hagiwara, was serialized in Square Enix's Monthly GFantasy from October 18, 2011, to March 18, 2021, and collected in 16 tankōbon volumes. A seventeenth volume containing new chapters was released on July 18, 2023. Horimiya was published in English by Yen Press.

==== Volumes ====
No.	Original release date	Original ISBN	English release date	English ISBN
1	March 27, 2012	978-4-7575-3543-5	October 27, 2015	978-0-31634203-2
Pages 1–6; Page 6.5: Miyamura (宮村)
2	November 27, 2012	978-4-7575-3806-1	January 26, 2016	978-0-31626869-1
7. Student Council (生徒会, Seito-kai); 8. Stress and De-stress (ストレスとストレス解消, Sutoresu to sutoresu kaishō); 9. Happy March Birthday (3月のお誕生日おめでとう, 3 Tsuki no otanjōbiomedetō); 10. Young Izumi (いずみ青年, Izumi seinen); 11. A Sudden Shower (突然のにわか雨, Totsuzen no niwakaame); 12. So Stubborn (とても頑固です, Totemo gankodesu); 13. I Like (好きです, Sukidesu)
3	April 27, 2013	978-4-7575-3951-8	April 26, 2016	978-0-31635662-6
14. That's Okay (それでいいよ, Sorede ī yo); 15. Food I Like (好きな食べ物, Sukinatabemono); 16. Green, White & Red (緑、白、赤, Midori, shiro, aka); 17. Rebellion (反乱, Hanran); 18. The Faraway Spring (遥かな春, Harukana haru); 19. That Fateful Summer's Day (あの運命の夏の日, Ano unmei no natsu no hi); 20. Summer Cold (夏風邪, Natsu kaze)
4	October 26, 2013	978-4-7575-4107-8	July 26, 2016	978-0-31635664-0
21. SOS; 22. Retreat (後退, Kōtai); 23. Grey Man (グレイマン, Gureiman); 24. Transparent (透明, Tōmei); 25. Can't Stay (泊まれない, Tomarenai); 26. Midsummer's Day (土用の丑の日, Doyō no Ushi no Hi); 27. Flavour (風味, Fūmi)
5	April 26, 2014	978-4-7575-4297-6	October 25, 2016	978-0-31635667-1
Pages 27–34
6	October 27, 2014	978-4-7575-4325-6	January 24, 2017	978-0-31635673-2
Page 35–42
7	May 27, 2015	978-4-7575-4658-5	April 18, 2017	978-0-31646932-6
Pages 43–50
8	November 27, 2015	978-4-7575-4814-5	July 18, 2017	978-0-31656019-1
Pages 51–56
9	May 27, 2016	978-4-7575-4998-2	October 31, 2017	978-0-31647330-9
Pages 57–63
10	November 26, 2016	978-4-7575-5167-1	March 27, 2018	978-0-31641605-4
Pages 64–71
11	August 26, 2017	978-4-7575-5460-3	June 26, 2018	978-1-97532750-7
Pages 72–81
12	May 26, 2018	978-4-7575-5731-4	December 11, 2018	978-1-97532922-8
Pages 82–90
13	February 27, 2019	978-4-7575-6032-1	January 28, 2020	978-1-97535964-5
Pages 91–100
14	December 27, 2019	978-4-7575-6452-7	July 21, 2020	978-1-97531392-0
Pages 101–109
15	September 18, 2020	978-4-7575-6848-8	July 13, 2021	978-1-97532472-8
Pages 110–118
16	July 18, 2021	978-4-7575-7282-9	May 23, 2023	978-1-97534731-4
Pages 119–121; Last Page; Extra Pages 1–3
17	July 18, 2023	978-4-7575-8634-5 (RE); 978-4-7575-8635-2 (SE)	October 22, 2024	978-1-97539142-3
Prologue; Pieces 1–8; Epilogue

=== Anime ===
A 13-episode anime television series adaptation of Daisuke Hagiwara's Horimiya was announced on September 17, 2020. The series was animated by CloverWorks and directed by Masashi Ishihama, with Takao Yoshioka handling series' composition, Haruko Iizuka designing the characters, and Masaru Yokoyama composing the series' music. It aired from January 10 to April 4, 2021, on Tokyo MX and other channels. The opening theme song is "Iro Kōsui" (色香水; "Color Perfume") performed by Yoh Kamiyama, while the ending theme song is "Yakusoku" (約束; "Promise") performed by Friends.

Funimation licensed the series and streamed it on its website in North America, the British Isles, Mexico, and Brazil, in Europe through Wakanim, and in Australia and New Zealand through AnimeLab. On February 5, 2021, Funimation announced that the series would be receiving an English dub, which premiered the next day. Following Sony's acquisition of Crunchyroll, the series was moved to Crunchyroll. Medialink has licensed the series in Southeast Asia and South Asia, and streamed it on Bilibili only in Southeast Asia. The company later began streaming the first episode on their Ani-One YouTube channel for a limited time, from February 13 to March 15, 2021. They also licensed the anime to Animax Asia for TV airing.

A second anime series, titled Horimiya: The Missing Pieces, was announced at AnimeJapan on March 25, 2023. It features stories from the manga that were not adapted in the previous anime. The series aired from July 1 to September 23, 2023. The opening theme song is "Shiawase" (幸せ; "Happiness") performed by Omoinotake, while the ending theme song is "URL" performed by Ami Sakaguchi. Crunchyroll streamed the series under the title Horimiya: The Missing Pieces.

=== Live-action film and TV drama ===
A live-action film and a television series adaptation was announced on November 23, 2020, with the main cast and staff being revealed on December 21, 2020. The film and TV drama are produced by Horipro and directed by Hana Matsumoto. The theatrical edition, compiling the content from the first three television episodes with its own exclusive scenes, was screened for a week from February 5, 2021, while the television version began broadcasting on MBS's Dramaism programming block, TBS and Apple TV+ exclusively in Japan on February 17, 2021. The opening theme is "What Do We Do?" (どうすんの？, Dō Sun'no?), while the ending theme is "Lamplight" (灯, "Tomoshibi"), both performed by Toketadenkyu.

No.	Title	Directed by	Written by	Original release date
1	"Episode 1"; Transliteration: "Dai-ichi-wa" (Japanese: 第1話)	Hana Matsumoto	Yoshifumi Sakai	February 17, 2021
Kyoko Hori, the most popular girl in her class, dresses plainly at home and takes care of housework. One day, Izumi Miyamura, the class loner, discovers her secret when he escorts her younger brother, Sota, home from a nosebleed. Hori discovers that Miyamura wears piercings outside of school and has tattoos, but the two decide to keep each others' secrets and befriend each other as Miyamura continues to visit to play with Sota. Meanwhile, Toru Ishikawa, a classmate, befriends Miyamura in spite of his feelings for Hori and tells him that he plans on confessing to her. Miyamura puts distance between himself and Hori, and he accidentally exposes his true appearance in front of Yoshikawa on his way to help Hori buy eggs during a flash sale. Hori confronts him, upset that he had avoided her to protect her reputation. The two make up.
2	"Episode 2"; Transliteration: "Dai-ni-wa" (Japanese: 第2話)	Hana Matsumoto	Yoshifumi Sakai	February 24, 2021
At school, the student council asks Hori with help on their paperwork. They later accuse her of losing the budget report, but Miyamura proves her innocence by revealing Remi had accidentally dropped it when she bumped into him, and then he headbutts Sengoku. They apologize, while Hori reveals she helped the student council out of guilt for bullying Sengoku in their childhood. When Ishikawa confronts Miyamura about Hori, Miyamura denies that she has feelings for him, and they get into an altercation. The two apologize, while Miyamura reveals to Yoshikawa that Hori was the cause of their fight. After school, Hori and Miyamura compare their hands, and Hori nearly confesses her feelings to him. Later, Hori falls ill, and Miyamura nurses her, learning more about the loneliness she experiences in the process. Believing Hori to be asleep, Miyamura confesses his feelings for her.
3	"Episode 3"; Transliteration: "Dai-san-wa" (Japanese: 第3話)	Hana Matsumoto	Yoshifumi Sakai	March 3, 2021
Miyamura dreams about when he first met Shindo. When Shindo visits, he urges Miyamura to confront his feelings for Hori. Hori avoids Miyamura, culminating in her throwing her textbook at him. When Miyamura arrives at her home to return the textbook, the two apologize to each other. Hori allows Miyamura to explain, and they are interrupted by her father, Kyosuke. Hori confirms Miyamura is her boyfriend, and they begin dating. Ishikawa falls into a slump learning about this but affirms Miyamura they are still friends. As summer arrives, Sakura falls in love with Ishikawa when he helps her pick up papers she scattered. The other students discover Hori and Miyamura are dating after Miyamura spends the night at her house. Concerned about how his reputation is affecting hers, he decides to cut his hair and stop wearing glasses.
4	"Episode 4"; Transliteration: "Dai-yon-wa" (Japanese: 第4話)	Hana Matsumoto	Tomohiro Ōtoshi	March 10, 2021
Miyamura's new look draws attention from the girls. After school, while Shindo shares candy with Hori and Miyamura, Miyamura kisses Hori for the first time. Ishikawa lends Sakura his jersey to hide a stain, and Sakura bakes cookies as thanks. Jealous, Yuki asks Miyamura for help on baking cupcakes, and though they become burnt, Ishikawa encourages her to bake more. The girls suggest Hori act docile around Miyamura by pretending she is scared during a horror movie, but she ends up scaring Miyamura. Hori becomes embarrassed, but Miyamura reminds her he loves her for who she is. He spends the night at her house and they consummate.
5	"Episode 5"; Transliteration: "Dai-go-wa" (Japanese: 第5話)	Mamoru Yoshino	Tomohiro Ōtoshi	March 17, 2021
The sports festival is taking place at school, with Hori, Miyamura, and their friends split between the East and West teams. During a table tennis tournament, Remi beats Hori by distracting her with threats to steal Miyamura away. Miyamura notices that their classmate, Mizouchi, has a crush on Hori and volunteers for his team's basketball event to put an end to their rivalry. When Miyamura wins, Hori lets him see her in the West team's cheerleading uniform. Afterwards, in a dream, Miyamura comforts his past self, telling him that he will make friends soon.
6	"Episode 6"; Transliteration: "Dai-roku-wa" (Japanese: 第6話)	Mamoru Yoshino	Gōta Ishida	March 24, 2021
7	"Episode 7"; Transliteration: "Dai-nana-wa" (Japanese: 第7話)	Hana Matsumoto	Yoshifumi Sakai	March 31, 2021
8	"Episode 8"	Hana Matsumoto	Yoshifumi Sakai	March 31, 2021
9	"Episode 9"	Hana Matsumoto	Yoshifumi Sakai	March 31, 2021
10	"Episode 10"	Hana Matsumoto	Yoshifumi Sakai	March 31, 2021
11	"Episode 11"	Hana Matsumoto	Yoshifumi Sakai	March 31, 2021
12	"Episode 12"	Hana Matsumoto	Yoshifumi Sakai	March 31, 2021
13	"Episode 13"	Hana Matsumoto	Yoshifumi Sakai	March 31, 2021

== Reception ==
Volume 2 of Horimiya reached the 15th place on the weekly Oricon manga charts and, as of December 2, 2012, had sold 43,735 copies; volume 3 reached the 32nd place and, as of May 4, 2013, had sold 75,124 copies; volume 4 reached the 21st place and, as of November 10, 2013, had sold 96,786 copies; volume 5 reached the 8th place and, as of May 11, 2014, had sold 171,530 copies; volume 6 reached the 2nd place and, as of November 16, 2014, had sold 208,788 copies.

Horimiya was sixth in the Nationwide Bookstore Employees' Recommended Comics of 2014.
