= Crunchyroll Anime Awards =

Annual awards presented by Crunchyroll

- Previous: 10th Crunchyroll Anime Awards; May 23, 2026
- The Anime Awards logo
- Awarded for: Best in anime of the previous year
- Country: United States; Japan
- Presented by: Crunchyroll
- First award: January 11, 2017; 9 years ago
- Website: crunchyroll.com/animeawards

The Crunchyroll Anime Awards, also known simply as The Anime Awards, are awards given annually by the anime streaming service Crunchyroll to recognize the best anime of the previous year. Announced in December 2016, the awards were first presented in January 2017. Crunchyroll describes it as a "global event that recognizes the anime shows, characters, and artists that fans around the world love most."

The Anime Awards were originally held in California in the United States. In 2023, the Awards moved to the Grand Prince Hotel New Takanawa in Tokyo, Japan for the 7th ceremony and have been held there ever since. The most recent ceremony was the 10th ceremony, held on May 23, 2026, where the eighth and final season of My Hero Academia won the Anime of the Year award.

== Process ==
The awards have two rounds of voting. Initially, each judge will submit up to five potential candidates for each category. Six candidates that received the highest amount of nominations from this round will be included in the final list for the next round, which is a one-week public voting. Winners for each category are determined by the most judge and public votes weighted in a 70:30 ratio respectively since at least the 6th edition.

For the first six editions of the awards, any anime that was produced primarily in Japan and released legally on television, cinema, or online from January to December of the previous year were eligible for nomination. The eligibility period was changed for the 7th and 8th editions, from October of the previous two years (Fall season) to September of the previous year (Summer season). However, in December 2024, Crunchyroll announced that starting from the 10th edition onwards, the eligibility period will return to its previous format of eligibility from January to December, with the eligibility period for the 9th edition covering October 2023 to December 2024 to accommodate the change in format. Eligible nominations for non-Japanese VA Performance are based on the initial release of the dub irrespective of when the anime was originally released.

The set of categories that will be presented varies for each edition, with categories added, removed, or otherwise renamed. The 9th edition, for example, featured 32 categories.

== Categories ==
=== Current ===
Crunchyroll announced the categories for each edition around December. The following list are the awards featured on its latest edition. Of these, only four awards (Anime of the Year, Best Animation, Best Opening Sequence and Best Ending Sequence) are currently active in every editions since its inauguration in 2017.

- Anime of the Year (since 2017)
- Film of the Year (2018–2019; since 2022)

==== Series awards ====
- Best Continuing Series (2018–2019; since 2023)
- Best New Series (since 2023)
- Best Original Anime (since 2023)

==== Production awards ====
- Best Animation (since 2017)
- Best Character Design (since 2019)
- Best Director (since 2019)
- Best Background Art (since 2024)

==== Music awards ====
- Best Opening Sequence (since 2017)
- Best Ending Sequence (since 2017)
- Best Score (since 2018)
- Best Anime Song (since 2023)

==== Voice acting awards ====
- Japanese (JP) (since 2019)
- English (EN) (since 2019)
- German (DE) (since 2022)
- French (FR) (since 2022)
- Latin American Spanish (LA) (since 2022)
- Castilian Spanish (SP) (since 2022)
- Portuguese (PT) (since 2022)
- Arabic (AR) (since 2023)
- Italian (IT) (since 2023)
- Hindi (HI) (since 2025)

==== Genre awards ====
- Best Drama (2017–2018; since 2020)
- Best Comedy (2017–2018; since 2020)
- Best Action (2017–2018; since 2022)
- Best Romance (since 2022)
- Best Slice of Life (2018; since 2024)
- Best Isekai Anime (since 2025)

==== Character awards ====
- Best Main Character (since 2023)
- Best Supporting Character (since 2023)
- "Must Protect at All Costs" Character (since 2023)

=== Special ===
These are awards uniquely given on certain editions, and are not part of the voting process. In 2023, two special awards were announced: Special Achievement Award and Presenter's Choice; however, both were not given during the ceremony.

- Industry Icon Award (2018–2020)
- Global Impact Award (since 2025)

=== Retired ===
- Best Character
  - Best Protagonist (2017–2022)
  - Best Antagonist (2017–2022)
  - Best Boy (2017–2022)
  - Best Girl (2017–2022)
- Best Fantasy (2020–2024)
- Best Fight Scene (2017–2022)
- Most Heartwarming Scene (2017)
- Best CGI (2018)
- Best Cinematography (2024)
- Best Manga (2018)
- Best Couple (2017; 2020–2021)
- Best Voice Artist Performance
  - Russian (RU) (2022)

== Editions ==
Ceremony	Date	Anime of the Year	Film of the Year	Most Nominations	Most Wins
1st Crunchyroll Anime Awards	January 28, 2017	Yuri on Ice	—N/a	Kabaneri of the Iron Fortress with 9 nominations	Yuri on Ice with 7 wins
2nd Crunchyroll Anime Awards	February 24, 2018	Made in Abyss	Your Name	My Hero Academia (season 2) with 10 nominations	My Hero Academia (season 2) with 8 wins
3rd Crunchyroll Anime Awards	February 16, 2019	Devilman Crybaby	My Hero Academia: Two Heroes	Megalobox with 8 nominations	My Hero Academia (season 3) with 4 wins
4th Crunchyroll Anime Awards	February 15, 2020	Demon Slayer: Kimetsu no Yaiba	—N/a	Carole & Tuesday, Demon Slayer: Kimetsu no Yaiba, and Vinland Saga with 9 nominations each	Demon Slayer: Kimetsu no Yaiba and Kaguya-sama: Love Is War with 3 wins each
5th Crunchyroll Anime Awards	February 19, 2021	Jujutsu Kaisen	—N/a	Great Pretender, Jujutsu Kaisen, and Keep Your Hands Off Eizouken! with 10 nominations each	Jujutsu Kaisen with 3 wins
6th Crunchyroll Anime Awards	February 9, 2022	Attack on Titan: The Final Season Part 1	Demon Slayer: Kimetsu no Yaiba – The Movie: Mugen Train	Jujutsu Kaisen (cour 2) with 16 nominations	Jujutsu Kaisen (cour 2) with 6 wins
7th Crunchyroll Anime Awards	March 4, 2023	Cyberpunk: Edgerunners	Jujutsu Kaisen 0	Spy × Family with 19 nominations	Spy × Family, Attack on Titan: The Final Season Part 2, and Demon Slayer: Kimetsu no Yaiba Entertainment District Arc with 6 wins each
8th Crunchyroll Anime Awards	March 2, 2024	Jujutsu Kaisen (season 2)	Suzume	Chainsaw Man with 25 nominations	Jujutsu Kaisen (season 2) with 11 wins
9th Crunchyroll Anime Awards	May 25, 2025	Solo Leveling	Look Back	Dandadan with 22 nominations	Solo Leveling with 9 wins
10th Crunchyroll Anime Awards	May 23, 2026	My Hero Academia: Final Season	Demon Slayer: Kimetsu no Yaiba – The Movie: Infinity Castle	Dandadan (season 2) with 20 nominations	Demon Slayer: Kimetsu no Yaiba – The Movie: Infinity Castle with 7 wins

== Records ==
=== Series ===
The following nominees received multiple nominations (5 or more):

Nominations	Title
47	Demon Slayer: Kimetsu no Yaiba
46	Attack on Titan
45	Jujutsu Kaisen
44	My Hero Academia
42	Dandadan
40	Spy × Family
30	The Apothecary Diaries
25	Chainsaw Man
25	Ranking of Kings
23	Solo Leveling
22	Mob Psycho 100
20	Frieren: Beyond Journey's End
20	Kaiju No. 8
19	Kaguya-sama: Love Is War
18	My Dress-Up Darling
17	Oshi no Ko
17	One Piece
16	Delicious in Dungeon
16	Gachiakuta
16	Vinland Saga
14	JoJo's Bizarre Adventure
13	Cyberpunk: Edgerunners
11	Beastars
11	Made in Abyss
11	Megalo Box
11	Odd Taxi
11	Wonder Egg Priority
10	Bocchi the Rock!
10	Great Pretender
10	Keep Your Hands Off Eizouken!
9	The Ancient Magus' Bride
9	Carole & Tuesday
9	Fruits Basket
9	Kabaneri of the Iron Fortress
9	KonoSuba: God's Blessing on this Wonderful World!
8	Aggretsuko
8	Hell's Paradise
8	Lycoris Recoil
8	Mashle: Magic and Muscles
8	Miss Kobayashi's Dragon Maid
8	Ranma ½
8	Re:Zero − Starting Life in Another World
8	The Promised Neverland
8	The Summer Hikaru Died
8	Sarazanmai
7	86
7	Devilman Crybaby
7	March Comes in Like a Lion
7	Takopi's Original Sin
7	Tower of God
7	Yuri on Ice
6	Dorohedoro
6	Dr. Stone
6	Erased
6	Komi Can't Communicate
6	Land of the Lustrous
6	Little Witch Academia
6	Tokyo Revengers
6	Violet Evergarden
6	Vivy: Fluorite Eye's Song
6	Zom 100: Bucket List of the Dead
5	Bleach: Thousand-Year Blood War
5	Descending Stories: Showa Genroku Rakugo Shinju
5	Dragon Ball Super
5	Heavenly Delusion
5	Mushoku Tensei: Jobless Reincarnation
5	SK8 the Infinity
5	The Fragrant Flower Blooms with Dignity
5	Witch Watch
5	Ya Boy Kongming!
5	Zombie Land Saga

The following winners received multiple awards (2 or more):

Awards	Title
22	Jujutsu Kaisen
19	Demon Slayer: Kimetsu no Yaiba
19	My Hero Academia
17	Attack on Titan
12	Spy × Family
11	Solo Leveling
7	Yuri on Ice
6	Chainsaw Man
6	Kaguya-sama: Love Is War
6	The Apothecary Diaries
5	Dandadan
5	One Piece
5	Re:Zero − Starting Life in Another World
4	Frieren: Beyond Journey's End
4	Mob Psycho 100
3	Gachiakuta
2	Cyberpunk: Edgerunners
2	Devilman Crybaby
2	Dr. Stone
2	Erased
2	Horimiya
2	JoJo's Bizarre Adventure
2	Keep Your Hands Off Eizouken!
2	Made in Abyss
2	Miss Kobayashi's Dragon Maid
2	Odd Taxi
2	Ranking of Kings
2	That Time I Got Reincarnated as a Slime
2	The Promised Neverland
2	The Rising of the Shield Hero

=== Films ===
The following nominees received multiple nominations (2 or more):

Nominations	Title
13	Chainsaw Man – The Movie: Reze Arc
8	Demon Slayer: Kimetsu no Yaiba – The Movie: Infinity Castle
6	Suzume
4	Demon Slayer: Kimetsu no Yaiba – The Movie: Mugen Train
4	Jujutsu Kaisen 0
4	One Piece Film: Red
3	Dragon Ball Super: Super Hero
3	Evangelion 3.0+1.0 Thrice Upon a Time
3	Look Back
2	A Silent Voice
2	Belle
2	Digimon Adventure: Last Evolution Kizuna
2	Haikyu!! The Dumpster Battle

The following winners received multiple awards (2 or more):

Awards	Title
7	Demon Slayer: Kimetsu no Yaiba – The Movie: Infinity Castle
3	Demon Slayer: Kimetsu no Yaiba – The Movie: Mugen Train
3	Jujutsu Kaisen 0
2	Chainsaw Man – The Movie: Reze Arc
2	Look Back

=== Overall [Series + Films] ===
The following nominees received multiple nominations (10 or more):

Nominations	Title
59	Demon Slayer: Kimetsu no Yaiba
49	Jujutsu Kaisen
47	Attack on Titan
46	My Hero Academia
42	Dandadan
41	Spy × Family
38	Chainsaw Man
30	The Apothecary Diaries
25	Ranking of Kings
23	Solo Leveling
22	Mob Psycho 100
21	One Piece
20	Frieren: Beyond Journey's End
20	Kaiju No. 8
20	Kaguya-sama: Love Is War
18	My Dress-Up Darling
17	Oshi no Ko
16	Delicious in Dungeon
16	Gachiakuta
16	Vinland Saga
14	JoJo's Bizarre Adventure
13	Cyberpunk: Edgerunners
11	Beastars
11	Made in Abyss
11	Megalo Box
11	Odd Taxi
11	Wonder Egg Priority
10	Bocchi the Rock!
10	Great Pretender
10	Keep Your Hands Off Eizouken!

The following winners received multiple awards (2 or more):

Awards	Title
29	Demon Slayer: Kimetsu no Yaiba
25	Jujutsu Kaisen
20	My Hero Academia
17	Attack on Titan
12	Spy × Family
11	Solo Leveling
8	Chainsaw Man
7	Yuri on Ice
6	Kaguya-sama: Love Is War
6	The Apothecary Diaries
5	Dandadan
5	One Piece
5	Re:Zero − Starting Life in Another World
4	Frieren: Beyond Journey's End
4	Mob Psycho 100
3	Gachiakuta
2	Cyberpunk: Edgerunners
2	Devilman Crybaby
2	Dr. Stone
2	Erased
2	Horimiya
2	JoJo's Bizarre Adventure
2	Keep Your Hands Off Eizouken!
2	Look Back
2	Made in Abyss
2	Miss Kobayashi's Dragon Maid
2	Odd Taxi
2	Ranking of Kings
2	That Time I Got Reincarnated as a Slime
2	The Promised Neverland
2	The Rising of the Shield Hero

== Criticisms ==
=== Bias towards popular shows ===
Since its inception, the Crunchyroll Anime Awards have been criticized for its process in nominations and awarding. Its inaugural ceremony in 2017, saw allegations of possible voting fraud after the sports series Yuri on Ice won all of its seven nominations including Anime of the Year. The win caused a controversy among Crunchyroll users, who accused fans of the series for rigging the vote in a heavily aggressive campaign. Following this, Crunchyroll responded by adjusting the awards system, introducing a new weighting system favoring jury in an attempt to minimize the effect of popular shows sweeping the awards. This change stopped the extremely popular superhero series My Hero Academia from winning Anime of the Year which went to Made in Abyss in the following edition; ultimately in the tenth edition, the eighth and final season of My Hero Academia won Anime of the Year, the first concluding season of an anime series to win the award.

The bias towards popular shows have been noted by several publications, including those who are part of the jury itself. In a reflection piece after the 8th edition, Animehunch opined that due to its design, the awards favor popularity over merit, noting that the second season of Vinland Saga was a far better recipient of Anime of the Year than the second season of Jujutsu Kaisen. This is reflected again in the following edition, where the extremely popular anime adaptation of the manhwa series Solo Leveling won Anime of the Year over critically-acclaimed series Frieren: Beyond Journey's End and The Apothecary Diaries. The decision led some viewers to question whether the awards were prioritizing hype and recency bias over artistic merit. Meanwhile, despite receiving 16 nominations, Netflix's Delicious in Dungeon did not win a single award. This outcome led to speculation about a potential bias against non-Crunchyroll platforms, with many fans questioning whether the series was deliberately overlooked, though Devilman Crybaby and Cyberpunk: Edgerunners, both released on Netflix, won the award in 2019 and 2023 respectively.

=== Lack of diversity in nominations ===
The lack of diversity in the nominations was also criticized: 29 of the 32 award winners were adaptations of manga published in Weekly Shōnen Jump; of the nine voice acting categories, four went to voice actors who voiced Denji from Chainsaw Man, while only one female voice actress won an award for voice acting Power from the same series. Anime News Network editors Steve Jones and Nicholas Dupree concluded that the Crunchyroll Anime Awards were for production committee administrators who collect the revenue from the franchises, rather than animators and translators. In this context, the award for the second season of Jujutsu Kaisen was viewed critically in various categories, as the animation studio had been criticized in the past for its poor working conditions.

=== Exclusion of Japanese audiences ===
In May 2026, during a conference held by the Association of Japanese Animations, Production I.G and Wit Studio president George Wada suggested a "Japanese Anime Awards". Wired Japan described the Crunchyroll Anime Awards as a "strange structural contradiction", in that the ceremony takes place in Japan and involves Japanese media but excludes the Japanese audience due to the service being geoblocked in the country. They also noted that "foreign" news outlets were given preferential treatment over Japanese news outlets. In response on July 4, during the Production I.G and Wit Studio's industry panel held at Anime Expo, Wada announced an event called Tokyo Anime Next, which takes place from October 30 to November 2, 2026. During the final day of the event, a new award show was revealed to be called "Nippon Anime Awards", set to launch at SGC Hall Ariake on November 21, 2027.

== See also ==
- List of animation awards
