= Hori-san to Miyamura-kun =

Japanese manga series

- First tankōbon volume cover of Hori-san to Miyamura-kun, featuring Kyouko Hori (left) and Izumi Miyamura (right)

堀さんと宮村くん
- Genre: Romantic comedy
- Manga
- Written by: Hero
- Published by: Self-published (webcomic); Square Enix (print)
- Imprint: Gangan Comics; Gangan Comics Online
- Original run: February 2007 – December 22, 2011
- Volumes: 10
- Manga
- Horimiya
- Manga

Hori-san to Miyamura-kun Omake
- Written by: Hero
- Published by: Self-published (webcomic); Square Enix (print)
- Imprint: Gangan Comics Online
- Original run: July 21, 2012 – July 16, 2021
- Volumes: 15
- Original video animation
- Directed by: Shingo Natsume (1); Erkin Kawabata (2); Tetsuo Hirakawa (3); Kazuya Aiura (4–6)
- Produced by: Masaru Nagai (1–2); Tarou Yamada (3)
- Written by: Yuniko Ayana
- Music by: Nobutaka Yoda (1–3); Yuuya Saitou (4–6); Rinko Ueda (4–6); harurukune (4–6)
- Studio: Hoods Entertainment (1–2); Marone (3); Gonzo (4–5); Studio Kai (6)
- Released: September 26, 2012 – May 25, 2021
- Runtime: 22–26 minutes
- Episodes: 6
- Anime television series
- Horimiya (2021); Horimiya: The Missing Pieces (2023)
- icon

Hori-san to Miyamura-kun (堀さんと宮村くん; lit. "Hori and Miyamura") is a Japanese manga series written and illustrated by Hiroki Adachi, under the pseudonym Hero. It was self-published as a webcomic on Hero's website, Dokkai Ahen, from February 2007 to December 2011 in a four-panel format. The series received a print publication by Square Enix, who compiled the chapters in 10 tankōbon volumes under its imprint Gangan Comics from October 2008 to December 2011. Additional side-story chapters were compiled in 15 volumes from July 2012 to July 2021 as Hori-san to Miyamura-kun Omake (堀さんと宮村くん おまけ).

Daisuke Hagiwara adapted the manga under Hero's supervision under the title Horimiya (ホリミヤ), which was serialized in Monthly G Fantasy from October 2011 to March 2021 and was compiled in 16 volumes. A seventeenth volume containing new chapters was released in July 2023. Horimiya is published in English by Yen Press.

Hori-san to Miyamura-kun was adapted into an original video animation (OVA) series from September 2012 to May 2021. An anime television series adaptation of Horimiya produced by CloverWorks aired from January to April 2021. A live-action film and TV drama adaptation premiered in February 2021. A second anime series, titled Horimiya: The Missing Pieces (ホリミヤ -piece-), aired from July to September 2023.

== Plot ==
The story primarily revolves around two high school students: Kyouko Hori, a bright and popular student, and Izumi Miyamura, a gloomy and seemingly nerdy otaku. In contrast to her image at school, Hori is a homebody who dresses down and looks after her younger brother, Souta. She takes every attempt to hide this from her classmates, as to not disrupt her social status that others have perceived of her and cause others to worry. One day, Souta comes home with a nosebleed. He had been accompanied by a boy with numerous piercings and tattoos, who introduces himself as Miyamura. After recognizing Hori, even when she is dressed down, they agree to keep their true identities concealed from their peers. However, over time, when the two begin to learn more about each other, they learn they have more in common than they originally thought. Together, they agree to assist one another in keeping their after school identities a secret. As time goes on, the two find themselves closer than ever.

== Characters ==
Kyouko Hori (堀 京子, Hori Kyōko; anime: Kyoko Hori)
Voiced by: Asami Seto (OVA), Haruka Tomatsu (TV anime) (Japanese); Marisa Duran (TV anime) (English)
Portrayed by: Sayu Kubota (live-action and TV drama)
A beautiful, bright, popular high school girl. While she presents as somewhat of an idol at school, at home she takes on a different look, dressing down and removing her makeup, tying her hair back, and doing housework while taking care of her little brother. Hori does not want her friends to see her in that state, but when Izumi Miyamura does, they agree to keep their real personas a secret. Initially, she only saw Miyamura as a close friend, but later on she begins to have romantic feelings towards him. She heard his confession to her when she seemed to be asleep. They became a couple after she admits Izumi is her boyfriend when her father asked her when Izumi was present.^{Ch.23} Because of her need to be self-sufficient, Hori has severe separation anxiety, and over time becomes more reliant on Miyamura's presence. She is later shown to also have a masochism kink. She and Miyamura eventually marry and, in the webcomic, have a son named Kyouhei.
Izumi Miyamura (宮村 伊澄, Miyamura Izumi)
Voiced by: Yoshitsugu Matsuoka (OVA), Koki Uchiyama (TV anime) (Japanese); Alejandro Saab (TV anime) (English)
Portrayed by: Ouji Suzuka (live-action film and TV drama)
A boy in Hori's class. At school, Izumi appears to be a gloomy pseudo-otaku fanboy with glasses who keeps to himself. However, outside of school, he is rather good looking and laid back, with a punk-styled look and nine piercings, four on each of his ears and one on his lip,^{Web ch. 1} as well as tattoos.^{Web ch. 2} Izumi grows his hair long to hide his ear piercings,^{Web ch. 1} and wears long-sleeved shirts to cover his tattoos.^{Web ch. 2} Despite his school appearance, he has only a casual interest in manga and subpar grades. His family runs a bakery.^{Web ch. 1} Much of the reason for Miyamura's initial behavior comes from bad experiences in middle school, where he suffered from social anxiety and was frequently teased for his appearance, leading him to cut off most of his relationships and accept being lonely forever. However, upon learning that Kyouko does not mind how he looks, he slowly gained confidence and friends among his classmates. This eventually leads to him changing his appearance altogether by cutting his hair offscreen (thereby exposing his piercings), wearing contacts, and wearing a sweater instead of his blazer, which immediately makes him more popular among other students. He has a long-standing crush on Kyouko and finds her real side to be cute, even when she gets angry.^{Web ch. 1,}^{Ch. 1} He was fine with being friends but his honest attitude allows him to tell Kyouko the things he admires in her. They officially became a couple after Kyouko's dad asked Kyouko whether Izumi is her boyfriend.^{Ch.23} He and Hori eventually marry and, in the webcomic, have a son named Kyouhei.
Souta Hori (堀 創太, Hori Sōta; anime: Sota Hori)
Voiced by: Yumiko Kobayashi (OVA), Yuka Terasaki (TV anime) (Japanese); Emily Fajardo (TV anime) (English)
Portrayed by: Haru Takagi (live-action film and TV drama)
Hori's little brother. After tripping and getting a nosebleed, Izumi brings Souta back to his home and where Souta constantly asks his sister to invite his new friend to come back. This gives Kyouko an excuse to hangout with Izumi after classes.^{Ch. 1}
Tooru Ishikawa (石川 透, Ishikawa Tōru; anime: Toru Ishikawa)
Voiced by: Yoshimasa Hosoya (OVA), Seiichiro Yamashita (TV anime) (Japanese); Zeno Robinson (TV anime) (English)
Portrayed by: Jin Suzuki (live-action film and TV drama)
A classmate of Hori and Miyamura, and the former's lifelong friend. Ishikawa has had a crush on Hori for a while, and initially feels awkward around Miyamura as a result. However, after Hori turns him down, he drops these feelings and befriends Miyamura when he noticed the two are spending more and more time together.^{Web ch. 6} He learns of Miyamura's secret about his tattoos and piercings shortly after Hori does.^{Web ch. 4} Ishikawa thinks lowly of himself, believing that he is unattractive and romantically unwanted, when that could not be further from the truth. He later starts dating Yoshikawa.
Yuki Yoshikawa (吉川 由紀, Yoshikawa Yuki)
Voiced by: Kana Ueda (OVA), Yurie Kozakai (TV anime) (Japanese); Anairis Quiñones (TV anime) (English)
Portrayed by: Rion Okamoto (live-action film and TV drama)
Kyouko's best friend. Though normally plucky and cheerful, Yoshikawa actually has an inferiority complex towards other people and believes that she is unworthy of everyone's affections. She developed a crush on Miyamura when she accidentally saw him without glasses and did not recognize him, but later dropped this after learning the truth. In reality, Yoshikawa has long had feelings for Ishikawa, but neglects to tell him for a while because he believes herself unworthy compared to Hori and Kono. Ishikawa, however, eventually recognizes her feelings.
Kakeru Sengoku (仙石 翔, Sengoku Kakeru)
Voiced by: Nobunaga Shimazaki (OVA), Nobuhiko Okamoto (TV anime) (Japanese); Belsheber Rusape Jr. (TV anime) (English)
Portrayed by: Akira Onodera (live-action film and TV drama)
Kyouko's childhood friend and the student council president.^{Vol. 2} He is seen as physically weak, leading him to develop a strong will (having been bullied by Kyouko when both were in grade school and middle school). In spite of his academic success and status as the student council president, he is a terrible cook. He is Remi's boyfriend; in the webcomic, they marry and have a daughter, Shizuru.
Remi Ayasaki (綾崎 レミ, Ayasaki Remi)
Voiced by: Akiko Hasegawa (OVA), M·A·O (TV anime) (Japanese); Jalitza Delgado (TV anime) (English)
Portrayed by: Aya Marsh (live-action film and TV drama)
A member of the student council, but is seen mostly as a mascot.^{Vol. 2} She wears her hair as twin tails, has a small build, and is very playful with others, leading some to not like her. She sometimes refers to herself in the third person.^{Vol. 2} She is childhood friends with Kono and inspires her to be more confident. She is also shown to be terrible at cooking. She is also Kakeru's girlfriend; in the webcomic, they eventually marry and have a daughter, Shizuru.
Sakura Kono (河野 桜, Kōno Sakura)
Voiced by: Yui Nomura (OVA), Reina Kondō (TV anime) (Japanese); Celeste Perez (TV anime) (English)
Portrayed by: Sakura (live-action film and TV drama)
A member of the student council, who does most of the work. She is shy and quiet, and later develops a crush on Tooru.
Shu Iura (井浦 秀, Iura Shū)
Voiced by: Hiro Shimono (OVA), Daiki Yamashita (TV anime) (Japanese); Y. Chang (TV anime) (English)
Portrayed by: Ryōsuke Sota (live-action film and TV drama)
Kyouko and Izumi's airhead classmate in their junior year, but he was in a different class in their senior year.
Kōichi Shindo (進藤晃一, Shindō Kōichi)
Voiced by: Taku Yashiro (Japanese); Christopher Llewyn Ramirez (English)
Portrayed by: Yūki Inoue (live-action film and TV drama)
Izumi's only best friend in junior high. Kyouko is always jealous of Shindo due to his close relationship with Izumi and worries that they will love each other.
Akane Yanagi (柳 明音, Yanagi Akane)
Voiced by: Jun Fukuyama (Japanese); Johnny Yong Bosch (English)
Portrayed by: Rihito Itagaki (live-action film and TV drama)
Yanagi is a student from the neighboring class who is in love with Yuki. Aside his good looks and gentlemanly personality, he has poor vision and constantly breaks his glasses or loses his contact lenses.
Honoka Sawada (沢田 ほのか, Sawada Honoka)
Voiced by: Kei Imoto (OVA), Momo Asakura (TV anime) (Japanese); Apphia Yu (TV anime) (English)
A student with a crush on Kyouko, and Izumi's neighbor. She had an older brother who coincidentally looked similar to Izumi, but died a year prior to the events of the series.
Yuuna Okuyama (奥山 有菜, Okuyama Yūna)
Voiced by: Aoi Koga^{Ep. 12 credits} (Japanese); Dani Chambers (English)
Souta's kindergarten classmate who used to bully Souta for having a sister complex. After Izumi shows her some kindness, she and Souta become friends.^{Ch. 2}
Yuriko Hori (堀 百合子, Hori Yuriko)
Voiced by: Ai Kayano (Japanese); Marissa Lenti (English)
Portrayed by: Aoba Kawai (live-action film and TV drama)
Kyouko's workaholic mother who can cook only curry, appreciative of Izumi's help in taking care of Souta with Kyouko. She was Kyousuke's classmate in high school.
Kyousuke Hori (堀 京介, Hori Kyōsuke)
Voiced by: Daisuke Ono (Japanese); Bill Butts (English)
Portrayed by: Ryo Kimura (live-action film and TV drama)
Kyouko and Souta's absentee/workaholic father, who approves of the relationship between Kyouko and Izumi (indirectly serving as the catalyst for its official start) and treats Izumi like his own best friend. Kyouko tends to be very blunt (and occasionally violent) towards him, due to his absence during her youth. He was Yuriko's classmate in high school.
Makio Tanihara (谷原マキオ, Tanihara Makio)
Voiced by: Shōya Chiba (Japanese); Kiba Walker (English)
Izumi's former bully from junior high. He later apologizes to Miyamura for his wrongdoings and went on to pursue a friendship with him.
Motoko Iura (井浦基子, Iura Motoko)
Voiced by: Hisako Kanemoto (Japanese); Emi Lo (English)
Shu's younger sister. She is aiming to enroll in East High, but her grades make such a goal difficult, despite the large amount of effort she puts into studying.
Takeru Sengoku (仙石 武, Sengoku Takeru)
Voiced by: Daisuke Namikawa (Japanese); William Ofoegbu (English)
Kakeru's father. He wants his son to focus on schoolwork to the exclusion of all else, including a social life. He was a classmate of Yuriko and Kyousuke in high school, and was on the receiving end of minor bullying from the latter.

== Media ==
=== Manga ===
==== Hori-san to Miyamura-kun ====
Hori-san to Miyamura-kun, written and illustrated by Hiroki Adachi under the pseudonym Hero, was posted on their website from February 2007 to December 2011. It later received a print publication by Square Enix, who compiled the chapters in 10 tankōbon volumes under its imprint Gangan Comics from October 22, 2008, to December 28, 2011.

| No. | Japanese release date | Japanese ISBN |
|---|---|---|
| 1 | October 22, 2008 | 978-4-7575-2419-4 |
| 2 | February 21, 2009 | 978-4-7575-2495-8 |
| 3 | July 21, 2009 | 978-4-7575-2609-9 |
| 4 | November 21, 2009 | 978-4-7575-2724-9 |
| 5 | February 22, 2010 | 978-4-7575-2797-3 |
| 6 | May 22, 2010 | 978-4-7575-2875-8 |
| 7 | October 22, 2010 | 978-4-7575-3025-6 |
| 8 | January 22, 2011 | 978-4-7575-3121-5 |
| 9 | May 22, 2011 | 978-4-7575-4946-3 |
| 10 | December 22, 2011 | 978-4-7575-3440-7 |

==== Horimiya ====
The Horimiya manga, illustrated by Daisuke Hagiwara, was serialized in Square Enix's Monthly G Fantasy from October 18, 2011, to March 18, 2021 and collected in 16 tankōbon volumes. Individual chapters are called "pages". A seventeenth volume containing new chapters was released on July 18, 2023. Horimiya is published in English by Yen Press.

==== Hori-san to Miyamura-kun Omake ====
| No. | Japanese release date | Japanese ISBN |
|---|---|---|
| 1 | July 21, 2012 | 978-4-7575-3670-8 |
| 2 | November 27, 2012 | 978-4-7575-3783-5 |
| 3 | April 27, 2013 | 978-4-7575-3952-5 |
| 4 | October 26, 2013 | 978-4-7575-4108-5 |
| 5 | April 26, 2014 | 978-4-7575-4202-0 |
| 6 | October 27, 2014 | 978-4-7575-4452-9 |
| 7 | May 27, 2015 | 978-4-7575-4659-2 |
| 8 | November 27, 2015 | 978-4-7575-4815-2 |
| 9 | May 27, 2016 | 978-4-7575-4946-3 |
| 10 | August 26, 2017 | 978-4-7575-5169-5 |
| 11 | May 26, 2018 | 978-4-7575-5738-3 |
| 12 | February 27, 2019 | 978-4-7575-6037-6 |
| 13 | December 27, 2019 | 978-4-7575-6453-4 |
| 14 | September 18, 2020 | 978-4-7575-6863-1 |
| 15 | July 16, 2021 | 978-4-7575-7374-1 |

=== Anime ===
==== OVAs ====
Six original video animations (OVAs) based on the Hori-san to Miyamura-kun manga have been produced. The first OVA was released on September 26, 2012, the second on March 25, 2014, the third on March 25, 2015, the fourth on December 14, 2018, the fifth and the sixth on May 25, 2021.

The ending theme for episode 1 is "Shirotsumekusa" (シロツメクサ) by Asami Seto as Kyoko Hori. The ending theme for episode 2 is "Ame Oto" (雨音) by Yoshitsugu Matsuoka as Izumi Miyamura. The ending theme for episode 3 is "Shiranai Sekai" (知らない世界) by Seto as Kyoko Hori. The ending theme for episode 4 is "Hinata" (向日葵) by Matsuoka. The ending themes for episodes 5 and 6 are "Trajectory" (軌跡) and "Gentle Song" (優しい歌) by Seto, respectively.

| No. | Title | Directed by | Written by | Original release date |
|---|---|---|---|---|
| 1 | "Hori and Miyamura: New Semester"; Transliteration: "Hori-san to Miyamura-kun: Shingakki" (Japanese: 堀さんと宮村くん -新学期-) | Shingo Natsume | Yuniko Ayana | October 5, 2012 |
Kyoko Hori, the most popular girl in her class, dresses plainly at home and takes care of housework. One day, Izumi Miyamura, the class loner, discovers her secret when he escorts her younger brother, Sota, home from a nosebleed. Hori discovers that Miyamura wears piercings outside of school and has tattoos, but the two decide to keep each others' secrets and befriend each other as Miyamura continues to visit to play with Sota. Meanwhile, Toru Ishikawa, a classmate, befriends Miyamura in spite of his feelings for Hori and tells him that he plans on confessing to her. Miyamura puts distance between himself and Hori until she confronts him, upset that he had avoided her to protect her reputation. The two make up, with Hori explaining she rejected Ishikawa. As Miyamura recalls his dark past, for a class project, Hori, Ishikawa, and Yoshikawa form a group with him, and he realizes he has them to call his friends.
| 2 | "Hori and Miyamura: Sudden Rain"; Transliteration: "Hori-san to Miyamura-kun: Totsuzen no Ame" (Japanese: 堀さんと宮村くん -突然の雨-) | Erkin Kawabata | Yuniko Ayana | March 25, 2014 |
The student council asks Hori to help plan a welcome party for the new students, so she asks Miyamura to help buy eggs during a flash sale. On the way, Miyamura accidentally exposes his true appearance in front of Yoshikawa. At night, Miyamura finds Hori's college planning worksheet crumpled up, comforts her over her uncertainty of the future, and gives her a spare worksheet the next day. Later, the student council accuses Hori of losing the budget report, but Miyamura proves her innocence by revealing Remi had thrown them away after miscalculating and then headbutts Sengoku. After school, Hori asks Miyamura why he is so kind to her, but he doesn't hear her over the rain. In the end, Miyamura escapes punishment because his headbutting Sengoku goes unnoticed by the other students, while Hori reveals she helped the student council out of guilt for bullying Sengoku in their childhood.
| 3 | "Hori and Miyamura: I Love"; Transliteration: "Hori-san to Miyamura-kun: Suki da" (Japanese: 堀さんと宮村くん -好きだ-) | Tetsuo Hirakawa | Yuniko Ayana | March 25, 2015 |
As summer arrives, Sakura falls in love with Ishikawa when he helps her pick up papers she scattered. Hori gives Miyamura ice cream, which he shares with Ishikawa and Sengoku. Hori and Miyamura lose a game among their friends and they are punished to buying drinks for them, with Ishikawa misunderstanding what happened between them. Ishikawa notices Hori is irritated when Miyamura's true appearance, revealed in a magazine article, draws attention from several girls. When Ishikawa confronts Miyamura about Hori, Miyamura denies that she has feelings for him, and they get into an altercation. The two apologize, while Miyamura reveals to Yoshikawa that Hori was the cause of their fight. After school, Hori and Miyamura compare their hands, and Hori nearly confesses her feelings to him. Confused about their conversation, the two get into argument about it the next day at school, but afterwards, Miyamura visits her house apologizing. As the day ends, the two acknowledge their growing feelings for each other.
| 4 | "Hori and Miyamura: Summer Flu"; Transliteration: "Hori-san to Miyamura-kun: Natsu Kaze" (Japanese: 堀さんと宮村くん -夏風邪-) | Kazuya Aiura; Akira Nishimori | Yuniko Ayana | December 14, 2018 |
While out in town, Hori and Ishikawa meet Shindo, Miyamura's middle school classmate. Later, Hori falls ill, and Miyamura nurses her, learning more about the loneliness she experiences in the process. Believing Hori to be asleep, Miyamura confesses his feelings for her. However, Sota reports that he saw Miyamura with another girl, unaware that she is Shindo's girlfriend Chika. Hori becomes upset and avoids Miyamura, culminating in her throwing her textbook at him. When Miyamura arrives at her home to return the textbook, the two apologize to each other. Hori allows Miyamura to explain, and they are interrupted by her father, Kyosuke.
| 5 | "Hori and Miyamura: Midsummer Day"; Transliteration: "Hori-san to Miyamura-kun: Manatsu Hi" (Japanese: 堀さんと宮村くん -真夏日-) | Kazuya Aiura | Yuniko Ayana | May 25, 2021 |
| 6 | "Hori and Miyamura: A Kind Person"; Transliteration: "Hori-san to Miyamura-kun: Yasashii Hito" (Japanese: 堀さんと宮村くん -優しい人-) | Kazuya Aiura | Yuniko Ayana | May 25, 2021 |

==== TV series ====
A 13-episode anime television series adaptation of Daisuke Hagiwara's Horimiya was announced on September 17, 2020. The series was animated by CloverWorks and directed by Masashi Ishihama, with Takao Yoshioka handling series' composition, Haruko Iizuka designing the characters, and Masaru Yokoyama composing the series' music. It aired from January 10 to April 4, 2021, on Tokyo MX and other channels. (Note: Tokyo MX listed the series premiere at 24:30 on January 9, 2021, which is January 10 at 12:30 a.m.) The opening theme song is "Iro Kōsui" (色香水; "Color Perfume") performed by Yoh Kamiyama, while the ending theme song is "Yakusoku" (約束; "Promise") performed by Friends.

Funimation licensed the series and streamed it on its website in North America, the British Isles, Mexico, and Brazil, in Europe through Wakanim, and in Australia and New Zealand through AnimeLab. On February 5, 2021, Funimation announced that the series would be receiving an English dub, which premiered the next day. Following Sony's acquisition of Crunchyroll, the series was moved to Crunchyroll. Medialink has licensed the series in Southeast Asia and South Asia, and streamed it on Bilibili only in Southeast Asia. The company later began streaming the first episode on their Ani-One YouTube channel for a limited time, from February 13 to March 15, 2021. They also licensed the anime to Animax Asia for TV airing.

A second anime series, titled Horimiya: The Missing Pieces, was announced at AnimeJapan on March 25, 2023. It features stories from the manga that were not adapted in the previous anime. The series aired from July 1 to September 23, 2023. The opening theme song is "Shiawase" (幸せ; "Happiness") performed by Omoinotake, while the ending theme song is "URL" performed by Ami Sakaguchi. Crunchyroll streamed the series under the title Horimiya: The Missing Pieces.

== Reception ==
Volume 2 of Horimiya reached the 15th place on the weekly Oricon manga charts and, as of December 2, 2012, had sold 43,735 copies; volume 3 reached the 32nd place and, as of May 4, 2013, had sold 75,124 copies; volume 4 reached the 21st place and, as of November 10, 2013, had sold 96,786 copies; volume 5 reached the 8th place and, as of May 11, 2014, had sold 171,530 copies; volume 6 reached the 2nd place and, as of November 16, 2014, had sold 208,788 copies.

Horimiya was sixth in the Nationwide Bookstore Employees' Recommended Comics of 2014.

== See also ==
- Ako and Bambi, another manga series by the same creator

== Notes on works cited ==
- "Web Ch." is shortened form for chapter and refers to a web chapter number of the collected Hori-san to Miyamura-kun four-panel web comic
- "Ch." is shortened form for chapter and refers to a chapter number of the collected Horimiya manga
- "Ep." is shortened form for episode and refers to an episode number of the collected Horimiya anime
