= Crunchyroll Anime Award for Best Slice of Life =

- Awarded for: Best slice of life anime series of the previous year
- Country: United States; Japan
- First award: White Fox — Girls' Last Tour (2018)
- Currently held by: Wit Studio and CloverWorks — Spy × Family Season 3 (2026)

Highlights
- Most wins: Studio: CloverWorks (2)
- Most nominations: Studio: CloverWorks (5)
- Website: Crunchyroll Anime Awards

The Crunchyroll Anime Award for Best Slice of Life is a genre-specific award given at the Crunchyroll Anime Awards since its second edition in 2018. It is given for the best slice of life anime series from the previous year. Winners are determined through a combined voting process by judges and public voting.

Post-apocalyptic science fiction anime Girls' Last Tour by White Fox first won the award in 2018. In the latest edition in 2026, the third season of Spy × Family by Wit Studio and CloverWorks won the award.

== Winners and nominees ==
In the following list, the first titles listed in gold are the winners; those not in gold are nominees, which are listed in alphabetical order. The years given are those in which the ceremonies took place.

=== 2010s ===
Year	Anime	Studio(s)
2017 (2nd)
2017 (2nd)	Girls' Last Tour	White Fox
2017 (2nd)	Interviews with Monster Girls	A-1 Pictures
2017 (2nd)	Kemono Friends	Yaoyorozu
2017 (2nd)	Recovery of an MMO Junkie	Signal.MD
2017 (2nd)	Sakura Quest	P.A. Works
2017 (2nd)	Tsuki ga Kirei	Feel

=== 2020s ===
Year	Anime	Studio(s)
2022/2023 (8th)
2022/2023 (8th)	Bocchi the Rock!	CloverWorks
2022/2023 (8th)	Do It Yourself!!	Pine Jam
2022/2023 (8th)	Horimiya: The Missing Pieces	CloverWorks
2022/2023 (8th)	Insomniacs After School	Liden Films
2022/2023 (8th)	My Love Story with Yamada-kun at Lv999	Madhouse
2022/2023 (8th)	Skip and Loafer	P.A. Works
2023/2024 (9th)
2023/2024 (9th)	Makeine: Too Many Losing Heroines!	A-1 Pictures
2023/2024 (9th)	Laid-Back Camp (season 3)	Eight Bit
2023/2024 (9th)	Mr. Villain's Day Off	Shin-Ei Animation and SynergySP
2023/2024 (9th)	My Deer Friend Nokotan	Wit Studio
2023/2024 (9th)	Sound! Euphonium (season 3)	Kyoto Animation
2023/2024 (9th)	The Dangers in My Heart (season 2)	Shin-Ei Animation
2025 (10th)
2025 (10th)	Spy × Family (season 3)	Wit Studio and CloverWorks
2025 (10th)	Anne Shirley	The Answer Studio
2025 (10th)	Blue Box	Telecom Animation Film
2025 (10th)	City the Animation	Kyoto Animation
2025 (10th)	My Dress-Up Darling (season 2)	CloverWorks
2025 (10th)	The Fragrant Flower Blooms with Dignity	CloverWorks

== Records ==
CloverWorks holds the record for the most wins and nominations in an anime studio.

Studio	Wins	Nominations	Seasons
CloverWorks	2	5	Bocchi the Rock!, Horimiya (The Missing Pieces) My Dress-Up Darling (Season 2), Spy × Family (Season 3), The Fragrant Flower Blooms with Dignity
A-1 Pictures	1	2	Interviews with Monster Girls, Makeine: Too Many Losing Heroines!
Wit Studio	1	2	My Deer Friend Nokotan, Spy × Family (Season 3)
Kyoto Animation	0	2	City the Animation, Sound! Euphonium (Season 3)
P.A. Works	0	2	Skip and Loafer, Tsuki ga Kirei
Shin-Ei Animation	0	2	Mr. Villain's Day Off, The Dangers in My Heart (Season 2)
