= Crunchyroll Anime Award for Best Romance =

- Awarded for: Best romance anime series of the previous year
- Country: United States; Japan
- First award: CloverWorks — Horimiya (2022)
- Currently held by: CloverWorks — The Fragrant Flower Blooms with Dignity (2026)

Highlights
- Most wins: Studio: CloverWorks (3); Anime: Horimiya (2)
- Most nominations: Studio: CloverWorks (5); Anime: Blue Box / Horimiya / Komi Can't Communicate / My Dress-Up Darling / Ranma ½ (2)
- Website: Crunchyroll Anime Awards

The Crunchyroll Anime Award for Best Romance is a genre-specific award given at the Crunchyroll Anime Awards since its sixth edition in 2022. It is given for the best romance anime series from the previous year. Winners are determined through a combined voting process by judges and public voting.

Horimiya by CloverWorks first won the award in 2022. In the latest edition in 2026, The Fragrant Flower Blooms with Dignity by CloverWorks won the award.

== Winners and nominees ==
In the following list, the first titles listed in gold are the winners; those not in gold are nominees, which are listed in alphabetical order. The years given are those in which the ceremonies took place.

=== 2020s ===
Year	Anime	Studio(s)
2021 (6th)
2021 (6th)	Horimiya	CloverWorks
2021 (6th)	Beastars (season 2)	Orange
2021 (6th)	Fruits Basket The Final Season (season 3)	TMS Entertainment
2021 (6th)	Don't Toy with Me, Miss Nagatoro	Telecom Animation Film
2021 (6th)	Komi Can't Communicate	OLM
2021 (6th)	The Duke of Death and His Maid	J.C.Staff
2021/2022 (7th)
2021/2022 (7th)	Kaguya-sama: Love Is War – Ultra Romantic (season 3)	A-1 Pictures
2021/2022 (7th)	Call of the Night	Liden Films
2021/2022 (7th)	Komi Can't Communicate (season 2)	OLM
2021/2022 (7th)	Love After World Domination	Project No.9
2021/2022 (7th)	My Dress-Up Darling	CloverWorks
2021/2022 (7th)	Shikimori's Not Just a Cutie	Doga Kobo
2022/2023 (8th)
2022/2023 (8th)	Horimiya: The Missing Pieces	CloverWorks
2022/2023 (8th)	Insomniacs After School	Liden Films
2022/2023 (8th)	My Happy Marriage	Kinema Citrus
2022/2023 (8th)	My Love Story with Yamada-kun at Lv999	Madhouse
2022/2023 (8th)	Skip and Loafer	P.A. Works
2022/2023 (8th)	Tomo-chan Is a Girl!	Lay-duce
2023/2024 (9th)
2023/2024 (9th)	Blue Box	Telecom Animation Film
2023/2024 (9th)	A Sign of Affection	Ajiado
2023/2024 (9th)	Makeine: Too Many Losing Heroines!	A-1 Pictures
2023/2024 (9th)	Ranma ½	MAPPA
2023/2024 (9th)	Scott Pilgrim Takes Off	Science SARU
2023/2024 (9th)	The Dangers in My Heart (season 2)	Shin-Ei Animation
2025 (10th)
2025 (10th)	The Fragrant Flower Blooms with Dignity	CloverWorks
2025 (10th)	Blue Box	Telecom Animation Film
2025 (10th)	Dandadan (season 2)	Science SARU
2025 (10th)	Honey Lemon Soda	J.C.Staff
2025 (10th)	My Dress-Up Darling (season 2)	CloverWorks
2025 (10th)	Ranma ½ (season 2)	MAPPA

== Records ==
=== Anime series ===
Horimiya holds the record for the most nominations and wins in an anime series.

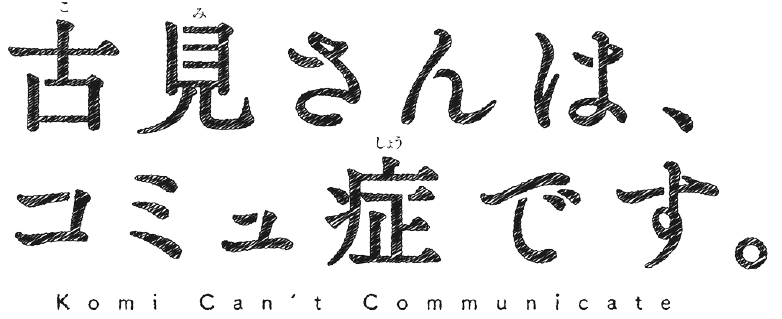
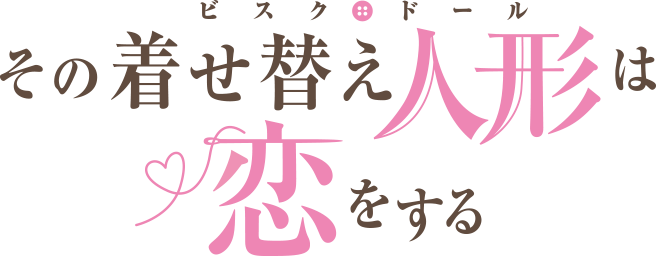

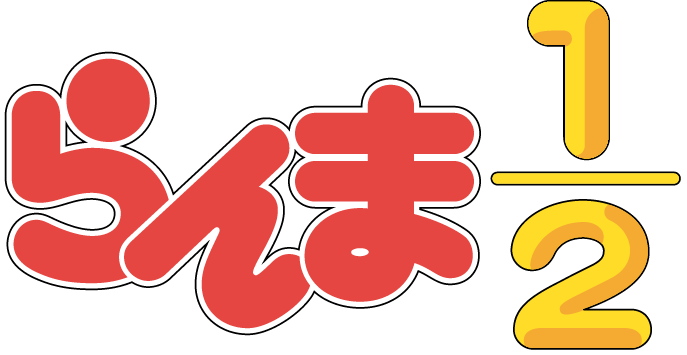
Komi Can't Communicate, My Dress-Up Darling, and Ranma ½ also holds the record for the most nominations–and the most nominations without a win in an anime series.

Franchise	Wins	Nominations	Seasons
Horimiya	2		Season 1, The Missing Pieces
Blue Box	1	2	Season 1, Season 1 cour 2
Komi Can't Communicate	0	2	Season 1, Season 2
My Dress-Up Darling	0	2	Season 1, Season 2
Ranma ½	0	2	Season 1, Season 2

=== Studios ===
CloverWorks holds the record for the most wins and nominations in an anime studio.

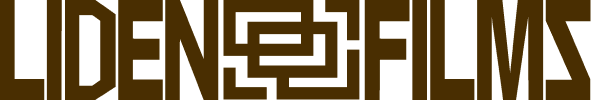

J.C.Staff, Liden Films, MAPPA, OLM, and Science SARU holds the record for the most nominations without a win in an anime studio.

CloverWorks received the most wins (3) and nominations (5). Horimiya tying with Blue Box, Komi Can't Communicate, My Dress-Up Darling, and Ranma ½ for the most nominations with 2, as well as having the most wins with 2 for an anime series. The remaining studios (A-1 Pictures and Telecom Animation Film) received a single award.

J.C.Staff, Liden Films, MAPPA, OLM, and Science SARU received the most nominations for an anime studio without a single win with 2. Komi Can't Communicate, My Dress-Up Darling, and Ranma ½ also did not win a single award.

Studio	Wins	Nominations	Seasons
CloverWorks	3	5	Horimiya (Season 1, The Missing Pieces), My Dress-Up Darling (Season 1, Season 2), The Fragrant Flower Blooms with Dignity
Telecom Animation Film	1	3	Blue Box (Season 1, Season 1 cour 2), Don't Toy with Me, Miss Nagatoro
A-1 Pictures	1	2	Kaguya-sama: Love Is War (Ultra Romantic), Makeine: Too Many Losing Heroines!
J.C.Staff	0	2	Honey Lemon Soda, The Duke of Death and His Maid
Liden Films	0	2	Call of the Night, Insomniacs After School
MAPPA	0	2	Ranma ½ (Season 1, Season 2)
OLM	0	2	Komi Can't Communicate (Season 1, Season 2)
Science SARU	0	2	Dandadan (Season 2), Scott Pilgrim Takes Off
