= Cinderella (Cider Girl song) =

Single by Cider Girl

from the album Soda Pop Fanclub 4
- Released: October 8, 2021
- Genre: J-pop
- Length: 3:33
- Label: Universal Music Japan
- Composer: Yurin
- Lyricist: Yurin

Music video
- "Cinderella Music Video" on YouTube

Cinderella (シンデレラ, Shinderera) is a single by Japanese rock band Cider Girl from their fourth album, Soda Pop Fanclub 4. It was released on October 8, 2021, through Universal Music Japan and serves as the first opening for the 2021 Japanese anime series Komi Can't Communicate.

== Background ==
Cider Girl was selected for their first anime tie-up and wrote "Cinderella" specifically for this anime. The official Twitter account of Komi Can't Communicate described the song as "one page from Komi-san's youth."

== Reception ==
After the song's release, Cider Girl started to gain popularity from the song, due to garnering attention from the anime. Akiho Minami of Real Sound described "Cinderella" as "a perfect match for the anime," describing the song as catchy. Minami praised how the phrase "Shall we nurture these little joys?" plays in a very important scene in the anime, enhancing the appeal of the work.

== Music video ==
The non-credit opening of the song was released in October 2021. The music video for "Cinderella" premiered on YouTube on November 1 of the same year. It is the band's first animated video on their channel. The music video centers around two women, getting described as a "sisterhood-like feel."

== Charts ==
Weekly chart performance for "Cinderella"
Chart (2021)	Peak position
Billboard Japan Top Download Songs	51
