= 6th Crunchyroll Anime Awards =

2022 award ceremony

- Awarded for: Excellence in anime
- Date: February 9, 2022
- Country: United States
- Presented by: Crunchyroll

Highlights
- Most wins: Jujutsu Kaisen (6)
- Most nominations: Jujutsu Kaisen (16)
- Anime of the Year: Attack on Titan: The Final Season Part 1
- Best Film: Demon Slayer: Kimetsu no Yaiba – The Movie: Mugen Train

The 6th Crunchyroll Anime Awards was held on February 9, 2022, honoring excellence in anime from 2021. Crunchyroll opened the public nominations for judges on October 14, 2021, running until October 20. On December 16, Crunchyroll revealed the list of judges. Nominees was announced on January 18. Voting ended on January 25. Winners were announced on February 9.

This edition featured 26 categories, including new voice acting categories for German, French, Spanish (Latin America), Spanish (Spain), Portuguese, and Russian. Best Romance was also added for the first time. Best Action and Best Film were reinstated. However, Best Couple was dropped.

Jujutsu Kaisen received 16 nominations, with Attack on Titan: The Final Season Part 1, Odd Taxi, and Wonder Egg Priority receiving 11. Jujutsu Kaisen was nominated again for Anime of the Year, after previously winning it. It also received two nominations for Best Fight Scene. Its protagonist, Yuji Itadori, was nominated again for Best Protagonist. Sunghoo Park, the director of the series, was nominated again for Best Director. Eren Jaeger of Attack on Titan was nominated for both Best Protagonist and Antagonist. Tokyo Revengers received two nominations for Best Boy. Jujutsu Kaisen, Demon Slayer: Kimetsu no Yaiba, and Miss Kobayashi's Dragon Maid were nominated again for Best Animation. Yuki Kajiura and Go Shiina were nominated again for Best Score, along with Satoru Kōsaki and Hiroyuki Sawano, the latter receiving his third nomination for the award. Voice actors Laura Bailey, David Wald, and Anairis Quiñones received their second nominations for Best VA Performance (EN). Attack on Titan and Beastars both received nominations for both Best Opening Sequence and Best Ending Sequence. Previous winners Fruits Basket and Miss Kobayashi's Dragon Maid were also nominated for Best Drama and Best Comedy respectively, with the former receiving its third nomination for the award.

Series targeted towards the shōnen demographic entries dominated the awards, with Jujutsu Kaisen winning six. However, the first part of the final season of Attack on Titan won Anime of the Year. Bojji from Ranking of Kings won Best Boy, while Nobara Kugisaki from Jujutsu Kaisen won Best Girl. Odokawa from Odd Taxi won Best Protagonist, while Eren Jaeger from Attack on Titan won Best Antagonist. Baku Kinoshita, director of Odd Taxi, won Best Director. Demon Slayer: Mugen Train Arc won Best Animation and Best Score. Yuki Kaji won Best VA Performance (JP), while David Wald won Best VA Performance (EN). René Dawn-Claude, Enzo Ratsito, Irwin Daayán, Marcel Navarro, Leo Rabelo, and Islam Gandzhaev won the inaugural Best VA Performance for German, French, Spanish (Latin America), Spanish (Spain), Portuguese, and Russian respectively. "Boku no Sensou" won Best Opening Sequence, while "Shirogane" won Best Ending Sequence. Jujutsu Kaisen won Best Action, Komi Can't Communicate won Best Comedy, To Your Eternity won Best Drama, Horimiya won Best Romance, and That Time I Got Reincarnated as a Slime won Best Fantasy. The film Demon Slayer: Kimetsu no Yaiba – The Movie: Mugen Train won Best Film.

== Winners and nominees ==
Winners are listed first, highlighted in boldface, and indicated with a double dagger (‡). The lists are arranged alphabetically, except for the winner.

| **Anime of the Year**: **Attack on Titan: The Final Season Part 1 — MAPPA**‡; 86 — A-1 Pictures; Jujutsu Kaisen (cour 2) — MAPPA; Odd Taxi — OLM and P.I.C.S; Ranking of Kings — Wit Studio; Sonny Boy — Madhouse | **Best Film**: **Demon Slayer: Kimetsu no Yaiba – The Movie: Mugen Train — Ufotable**‡; Belle — Studio Chizu; Evangelion 3.0+1.0 Thrice Upon a Time — Khara; Josee, the Tiger and the Fish — Bones; Shirobako: The Movie — P.A. Works; Words Bubble Up Like Soda Pop — Signal.MD and Sublimation |
| **Best Boy**: **Bojji — Ranking of Kings**‡; Senku Ishigami — Dr. Stone (season 2); Izumi Miyamura — Horimiya; Odokawa — Odd Taxi; Ken 'Draken' Ryuguji — Tokyo Revengers; Manjiro 'Mikey' Sano — Tokyo Revengers | **Best Girl**: **Nobara Kugisaki — Jujutsu Kaisen (cour 2)**‡; Tohru Honda — Fruits Basket The Final Season; Shoko Komi — Komi Can't Communicate; Vladilena Milizé — 86; Ai Ohto — Wonder Egg Priority; Sarasa Watanabe – Kageki Shojo!! |
| **Best Protagonist**: **Odokawa — Odd Taxi**‡; Bojji — Ranking of Kings; Yuji Itadori — Jujutsu Kaisen (cour 2); Eren Jaeger — Attack on Titan: The Final Season Part 1; Joe — Megalobox 2: Nomad; Ai Ohto — Wonder Egg Priority | **Best Antagonist**: **Eren Jaeger — Attack on Titan: The Final Season Part 1**‡; Echidna — Re:Zero − Starting Life in Another World (season 2); Tetta Kisaki - Tokyo Revengers; Tomura Shigaraki — My Hero Academia (season 5); Ainosuke Shindo — SK8 the Infinity; Yano — Odd Taxi |
| **Best Fight Scene**: **Yuji Itadori & Aoi Todo vs. Hanami — Jujutsu Kaisen (cour 2)**‡; Eren Jaeger vs. War Hammer Titan — Attack on Titan: The Final Season Part 1; Naruto Uzumaki vs. Isshiki Otsutsuki — Boruto: Naruto Next Generations; Yuji Itadori & Nobara Kugisaki vs. Eso & Kechizu — Jujutsu Kaisen (cour 2); Elma vs. Tohru — Miss Kobayashi's Dragon Maid S; Vivy vs. Yugo Kakitani — Vivy: Fluorite Eye's Song | **Best Director**: **Baku Kinoshita — Odd Taxi**‡; Yuichiro Hayashi — Attack on Titan: The Final Season Part 1; Yo Moriyama — Megalobox 2: Nomad; Shingo Natsume — Sonny Boy; Sunghoo Park — Jujutsu Kaisen (cour 2); Shin Wakabayashi — Wonder Egg Priority |
| **Best Animation**: **Demon Slayer: Kimetsu no Yaiba Mugen Train Arc — Ufotable**‡; Jujutsu Kaisen (cour 2) — MAPPA; Miss Kobayashi's Dragon Maid S — Kyoto Animation; Mushoku Tensei: Jobless Reincarnation — Studio Bind; Vivy: Fluorite Eye's Song — Wit Studio; Wonder Egg Priority — CloverWorks | **Best Character Design**: **Tadashi Hiramatsu, original designs by Gege Akutami — Jujutsu Kaisen (cour 2)**‡; Michinori Chiba — SK8 the Infinity; Baku Kinoshita and Hiromi Nakayama — Odd Taxi; loundraw and Yuichi Takahashi — Vivy: Fluorite Eye's Song; Atsuko Nozaki, original designs by Sōsuke Tōka — Ranking of Kings; Saki Takahashi — Wonder Egg Priority |
| **Best Score**: **Yuki Kajiura and Go Shiina — Demon Slayer: Kimetsu no Yaiba Mugen Train Arc**‡; DÉ DÉ MOUSE and Mito — Wonder Egg Priority; Satoru Kōsaki — Vivy: Fluorite Eye's Song; Mabanua — Megalobox 2: Nomad; PUNPEE, VaVa, and OMSB — Odd Taxi; Hiroyuki Sawano and Kohta Yamamoto — 86 | **Best VA Performance (JP)**: **Yuki Kaji as Eren Jaeger — Attack on Titan: The Final Season Part 1**‡; Ayane Sakura as Gabi Braun — Attack on Titan: The Final Season Part 1; Kiyoshi Kobayashi as Daisuke Jigen (ep. 0) — Lupin the 3rd Part 6; Aoi Yūki as Kumoko - So I'm a Spider, So What?; Natsuki Hanae as Odokawa — Odd Taxi; Kanata Aikawa as Ai Ohto — Wonder Egg Priority |
| **Best VA Performance (EN)**: **David Wald as Ainosuke Shindo — SK8 the Infinity**‡; Brittany Cox as Fena — Fena: Pirate Princess; Laura Bailey as Tohru Honda — Fruits Basket The Final Season; Adam McArthur as Yuji Itadori — Jujutsu Kaisen (cour 2); Matt Shipman as Reki Kyan — SK8 the Infinity; Anairis Quiñones as Rika Kawai — Wonder Egg Priority | **Best VA Performance (DE)**: **René Dawn-Claude as Satoru Gojo — Jujutsu Kaisen (cour 2)**‡; Florian Knorn as Tai Yagami — Digimon Adventure: Last Evolution Kizuna; Rieke Werner as Sakura Matou — Fate/stay night: Heaven's Feel III. spring song; Marios Gavrilis as Dio Brando — JoJo's Bizarre Adventure: Phantom Blood; Tommy Morgenstern as Galo Thymos — Promare; Torsten Münchow as The Count of Monte Cristo — Gankutsuou: The Count of Monte Cristo |
| **Best VA Performance (FR)**: **Enzo Ratsito as Tanjiro Kamado — Demon Slayer: Kimetsu no Yaiba Mugen Train Arc**‡; Mark Lesser as Satoru Gojo — Jujutsu Kaisen (cour 2); Alexis Thomassian as Kage — Ranking of Kings; Brieuc Lemaire as Vanitas — The Case Study of Vanitas; Nancy Philippot as Raphtalia — The Rising of the Shield Hero; Olivier Premel as Takemichi Hanagaki — Tokyo Revengers | **Best VA Performance (LA)**: **Irwin Daayán as Kyojuro Rengoku — Demon Slayer: Kimetsu no Yaiba Mugen Train Arc**‡; José Vilchis as Spike Spiegel — Cowboy Bebop; Victor Ugarte as Shinji Ikari — Evangelion 3.0+1.0 Thrice Upon a Time; José Gilberto Vilchis as Satoru Gojo - Jujutsu Kaisen (cour 2); Jessica Ángeles as Kaguya Shinomiya — Kaguya-sama: Love Is War; Romina Marroquín as Kumoko — So I'm a Spider, So What? |
| **Best VA Performance (SP)**: **Marcel Navarro as Tanjiro Kamado — Demon Slayer: Kimetsu no Yaiba – The Movie: Mugen Train**‡; Bianca Rada as Tai Yagami — Digimon Adventure: Last Evolution Kizuna; Albert Trifol Segarra as Shinji Ikari — Evangelion 3.0+1.0 Thrice Upon a Time; Adelaida López as Usagi Tsukino — Sailor Moon Eternal; Blanca Hualde (Neri) as Brunhilde — Record of Ragnarok; Marc Zanni as Tatsu — The Way of the Househusband | **Best VA Performance (PT)**: **Leo Rabelo as Satoru Gojo — Jujutsu Kaisen (cour 2)**‡; Hannah Buttel as Vladilena Milizé — 86; Amanda Brigido as Nobara Kugisaki — Jujutsu Kaisen (cour 2); Carol Valença as Monkey D. Luffy — One Piece; Luísa Viotti as Echidna — Re:Zero − Starting Life in Another World (season 2); Luiz Sergio Vieira as Takemichi Hanagaki — Tokyo Revengers |
| **Best VA Performance (RU)**: **Islam Gandzhaev as Tanjiro Kamado — Demon Slayer: Kimetsu no Yaiba – The Movie: Mugen Train**‡; Vlad Tokarev as Eren Jaeger — Attack on Titan: The Final Season Part 1; Olga Matskevich as Mire Yoshizuki — Looking for Magical Doremi; Polina Rtischeva as Monkey D. Luffy — One Piece; Elizaveta Sheikh as Kumoko — So I'm a Spider, So What?; Tatyana Shamarina as Vivy — Vivy: Fluorite Eye's Song | **Best Opening Sequence**: **"Boku no Sensou" by Shinsei Kamattechan, storyboard and direction by Yuichiro Hayashi — Attack on Titan: The Final Season Part 1**‡; "Kaibutsu" by Yoasobi — Beastars (season 2); "Vivid Vice" by Who-ya Extended, storyboard and direction by Shingo Yamashita — Jujutsu Kaisen (cour 2); "Ai no Supreme!" by Fhána, storyboard and direction by Tatsuya Ishihara — Miss Kobayashi's Dragon Maid S; "ODDTAXI" by Skirt and PUNPEE, storyboard and direction by Ryoji Yamada — Odd Taxi; "Cry Baby" by Official Hige Dandism — Tokyo Revengers |
| **Best Ending Sequence**: **"Shirogane" by LiSA, storyboard and direction by Tomonori Sudō — Demon Slayer: Kimetsu no Yaiba Mugen Train Arc**‡; "Shogeki" by Yuko Ando — Attack on Titan: The Final Season Part 1; "Yasashii Suisei" by Yoasobi — Beastars (season 2); "Nai Nai" by Reona, storyboard and direction by Tomohisa Taguchi — Shadows House; "Infinity" by Yuuri, storyboard by Hiroko Utsumi, direction by Akemi Hayashi — SK8 the Infinity; "Ganbare! Kumoko-san no Theme" by Aoi Yūki, storyboard and direction by Shin Itagaki — So I'm a Spider, So What? | **Best Action**: **Jujutsu Kaisen (cour 2) — MAPPA**‡; Attack on Titan: The Final Season Part 1 — MAPPA; Demon Slayer: Kimetsu no Yaiba Mugen Train Arc — Ufotable; SSSS.Dynazenon — Studio Trigger; Vivy: Fluorite Eye's Song — Wit Studio; Wonder Egg Priority — CloverWorks |
| **Best Comedy**: **Komi Can't Communicate — OLM**‡; Don't Toy with Me, Miss Nagatoro — Telecom Animation Film; Heaven's Design Team — Asahi Production; Life Lessons with Uramichi Oniisan — Studio Blanc; Miss Kobayashi's Dragon Maid S — Kyoto Animation; Odd Taxi — OLM and P.I.C.S | **Best Drama**: **To Your Eternity — Brain's Base**‡; 86 — A-1 Pictures; Fruits Basket The Final Season — TMS Entertainment; Kageki Shojo!! — Pine Jam; Odd Taxi — OLM and P.I.C.S; Wonder Egg Priority — CloverWorks |
| **Best Romance**: **Horimiya — CloverWorks**‡; Beastars (season 2) — Orange; Fruits Basket The Final Season — TMS Entertainment; Don't Toy with Me, Miss Nagatoro — Telecom Animation Film; Komi Can't Communicate — OLM; The Duke of Death and His Maid — J.C.Staff | **Best Fantasy**: **That Time I Got Reincarnated as a Slime (season 2) — Eight Bit**‡; Mushoku Tensei: Jobless Reincarnation — Studio Bind; Ranking of Kings — Wit Studio; The Case Study of Vanitas — Bones; To Your Eternity — Brain's Base; Wonder Egg Priority — CloverWorks |

== Statistics ==
Anime with multiple nominations
| Nominations | Anime |
|---|---|
| 16 | Jujutsu Kaisen (cour 2) |
| 11 | Attack on Titan: The Final Season Part 1 |
| 11 | Odd Taxi |
| 11 | Wonder Egg Priority |
| 6 | Ranking of Kings |
| 6 | Tokyo Revengers |
| 6 | Vivy: Fluorite Eye's Song |
| 5 | 86 |
| 5 | Demon Slayer: Kimetsu no Yaiba Mugen Train Arc |
| 5 | SK8 the Infinity |
| 4 | Fruits Basket The Final Season |
| 4 | Miss Kobayashi's Dragon Maid S |
| 4 | So I'm a Spider, So What? |
| 3 | Beastars (season 2) |
| 3 | Demon Slayer: Kimetsu no Yaiba – The Movie: Mugen Train |
| 3 | Evangelion 3.0+1.0 Thrice Upon a Time |
| 3 | Komi Can't Communicate |
| 3 | Megalobox 2: Nomad |
| 2 | Digimon Adventure: Last Evolution Kizuna |
| 2 | Don't Toy with Me, Miss Nagatoro |
| 2 | Horimiya |
| 2 | Kageki Shojo!! |
| 2 | Mushoku Tensei: Jobless Reincarnation |
| 2 | One Piece |
| 2 | Re:Zero − Starting Life in Another World (season 2) |
| 2 | Sonny Boy |
| 2 | The Case Study of Vanitas |
| 2 | To Your Eternity |

Anime with multiple wins
| Wins | Anime |
|---|---|
| 6 | Jujutsu Kaisen (cour 2) |
| 5 | Demon Slayer: Kimetsu no Yaiba Mugen Train Arc |
| 4 | Attack on Titan: The Final Season Part 1 |
| 3 | Demon Slayer: Kimetsu no Yaiba – The Movie: Mugen Train |
| 2 | Odd Taxi |
