= Yuka Terasaki =

- 寺崎 裕香
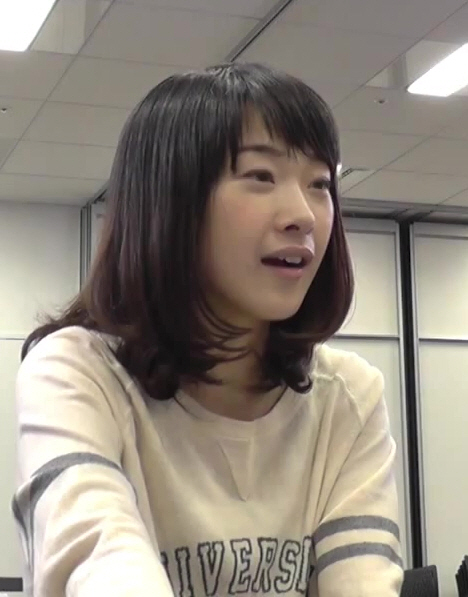
- Born: August 4, 1983 (age 43); Kumamoto, Kumamoto Prefecture, Japan
- Occupations: Actress; voice actress; singer
- Years active: 1992–present (as actress); 2004–present (as voice actress)
- Agent: Kenproduction
- Height: 155 cm (5 ft 1 in)
- Children: 1
- Musical career
- Genre: J-pop
- Instrument: Vocals
- Years active: 2012–present
- Label: Alniyat Music/Virgo Music Entertainment

Yuka Terasaki (寺崎 裕香, Terasaki Yuka; born August 4, 1983) is a Japanese actress, voice actress and singer from Kumamoto Prefecture. She is affiliated with Ken Production.

== Career ==
From April 5, 2015, to the end of the program on March 26, 2017, she served as the big sister on NHK BS Premium's "Waracchao!" succeeding Kuwako Maho.

On May 24, 2015, she entered the "Washimizu Tokyo Olympic Showdown" held at Shibuya TAKE OFF 7 with "Tegami," a song for which she wrote the lyrics and composed the music, and won against Washizaki Takeshi's "Olympic Love Love's Gold Medal" and Shimizu Kaori's "Ichirin no Hana."

As of March 31, 2022, she left Ogipro THE NEXT and joined Ken Production from April 1.

== Awards ==
In 2012, she won the Synergy Award at the 6th Seiyuu Awards for the "Inazuma Eleven" series.

== Filmography ==
=== Television animation ===
2006

- Onegai My Melody: Kuru Kuru Shuffle, Megumi Katori

2007

- Neko no Shuukai, Daughter, Chobi
- Reborn!: Basil

2008

- A Certain Magical Index: Sasha Kreutzev
- Yu-Gi-Oh! 5D's: Luca

2009

- Reborn!: Alfin

2011

- Inazuma Eleven Go: Tenma Matsukaze
- Chihayafuru: Arata Wataya (young)
- Lupin the 3rd: Record of Observations of the East - Another Page: Rumi

2012

- Hunter × Hunter: Zushi
- Smile Precure!: Keita Midorikawa
- Natsuiro Kiseki: Koharu Okiyama

2013

- Love Lab: Rentarō Kurahashi
- Senyu: Febuar Zwei
- Gargantia on the Verdurous Planet: Bebel
- Pocket Monsters: XY: Corni, Premier, Tony, Satoshi's Yayakoma/Hinoyakoma, Satoshi's Onbat
- DokiDoki! Precure: Raquel

2014

- Chaika - The Coffin Princess: Toru Acura (young)
- Magica Wars: Renka Ariake
- The World Is Still Beautiful: Kara Lemercier

2015

- My Love Story!!: Makoto Sunakawa (young)
- Is It Wrong to Try to Pick Up Girls in a Dungeon?: Hephaestus
- Mobile Suit Gundam: Iron-Blooded Orphans: Kudelia Aina Bernstein
- Kami-sama Minarai: Himitsu no Cocotama: Makoto Yotsuba, Tokumaru
- Pocket Monsters: XY&Z: Satoshi's Onbat

2016

- Kiznaiver: Chidori Takashiro
- Naruto: Shippuden: Itachi Uchiha (young)
- Macross Delta: Heinz Nerich Windermere

2017

- Inazuma Eleven: Ares: Masakatsu Hiyori

2018

- Bloom Into You: Akari Hyūga
- Cutie Honey Universe: Junpei Hayami
- Inazuma Eleven: Orion no Kokuin: Li Hao

2019

- Revisions: Kanae Izumi

2020

- Uchitama?! Have you seen my Tama?: Takeshi Okamoto
- Pokémon Journeys: Corni
- Iwa-Kakeru! Sport Climbing Girls: Kaoru Niijima
- Boruto: Naruto Next Generations: Natto Itohiki

2021

- Horimiya: Sōta Hori
- Shinkansen Henkei Robo Shinkalion Z: Hanabi Ōmagari
- Kageki Shojo!!: Akemi Takei

2022

- Made in Abyss: The Golden City of the Scorching Sun: Vueko

2023

- Skip and Loafer: Mika Egashira
- Pokémon Horizons: The Series: Roy
- Horimiya: The Missing Pieces: Sōta Hori

2024

- Tasūketsu: Fate of the Majority: Emperor
- The Elusive Samurai: Hōjō Kunitoki
- Shangri-La Frontier 2nd Season: Akane Akitsu

2027

- Dengeki Daisy: Riko Onizuka

=== Original video animation (OVA) ===
2024

- Code Geass: Rozé of the Recapture: Natalia Luxembourg

=== Original net animation (ONA) ===
2025

- Moonrise: Zowan

=== Theatrical animation ===
- Yu-Gi-Oh!: Bonds Beyond Time (2010): Luca
- Planzet (2010): Kaori Sagawa
- The Garden of Words (2013): Brother's girlfriend
- Hunter × Hunter: The Last Mission (2013): Zushi
- Yo-kai Watch: Enma Daiō to Itsutsu no Monogatari da Nyan! (2015): Yuto Arima
- Rudolf and Ippaiattena (2016): Rudolf's younger brother
- My Hero Academia: Heroes Rising (2019): Katsuma Shimano
- Zegapain STA (2024): Sefuto

=== Video games ===
- Harvest Moon DS: Grand Bazaar (2008): Gretel
- Inazuma Eleven GO (2011): Tenma Matsukaze
- Granblue Fantasy (2014): Laguna
- Hyperdevotion Noire: Goddess Black Heart (2014): Aizen Burossa
- Fate/Grand Order (2015): Paris
- Jack Jeanne (2021): Tachibana Kisa, Tachibana Tsuki

=== Dubbing ===
- F4 Thailand: Boys Over Flowers: Gorya Thithara Jundee (Tontawan Tantivejakul)
- FBI: Kristen Chazal (Ebonée Noel)
- Hypnotic: Viv (Kelly Frye)
- Willow: Jade (Erin Kellyman)
- The Second Best Hospital in the Galaxy: Dr. Sleech (Stephanie Hsu)

=== Television drama ===
- Utsukushii Rinjin (2011): Minami
- Kamen Rider Geats (2022): Mitsume (voice)

=== Radio drama ===
- Nissan A, Abe Reiji: Beyond the Average (2006–): Satomi Nansō

=== Stage ===
- Musical Kuroshitsuji-Chi ni Moeru Licorice- (2014): Meyrin

== Discography ==
Album

- Afterglow (2012)
