= Komi Can't Communicate =

Japanese manga series by Tomohito Oda

- First tankōbon volume cover, featuring Shoko Komi (left) and Hitohito Tadano (right)

古見さんは、コミュ症です。 (Komi-san wa, Komyushō desu)
- Genre: Coming-of-age; Romantic comedy; Slice of life
- Manga
- Written by: Tomohito Oda
- Published by: Shogakukan
- English publisher: NA: Viz Media; SEA: Shogakukan Asia
- Imprint: Shōnen Sunday Comics
- Magazine: Weekly Shōnen Sunday
- Original run: May 18, 2016 – January 29, 2025
- Volumes: 37
- Television drama
- Directed by: Yoshihito Okashita; Eiji Ishii
- Produced by: Hiroyuki Onuma
- Written by: Fumie Mizuhashi
- Music by: Eishi Segawa
- Studio: TV Man Union
- Original network: NHK General TV
- Original run: September 6, 2021 – November 1, 2021
- Episodes: 8
- Anime television series
- Directed by: Ayumu Watanabe (chief); Kazuki Kawagoe
- Written by: Deko Akao
- Music by: Yukari Hashimoto
- Studio: OLM Team Kojima
- Licensed by: Netflix (streaming rights)
- Original network: TXN (TV Tokyo)
- Original run: October 7, 2021 – June 23, 2022
- Episodes: 24 (76 segments)
- icon

Komi Can't Communicate (Japanese: 古見さんは、コミュ症です。, Hepburn: Komi-san wa, Komyushō desu; lit. 'Miss Komi Has Difficulties in Communicating') is a Japanese manga series written and illustrated by Tomohito Oda. It was serialized in Shogakukan's shōnen manga magazine Weekly Shōnen Sunday from May 2016 to January 2025, with its chapters collected in 37 tankōbon volumes. The series is licensed in North America by Viz Media. The story centers around Shoko Komi, a high school girl who has extreme social anxiety and struggles to communicate with others. With the help of her classmate Hitohito Tadano, they embark on a mission to make 100 friends and improve Komi's communication skills.

An eight-episode live-action television drama adaptation was broadcast from September to November 2021, while an anime television series adaptation produced by OLM aired from October to December of the same year; a second season aired from April to June 2022. The anime adaptation is licensed by Netflix for worldwide streaming.

By January 2025, the manga had over 16 million copies in circulation. In 2022, the manga won the 67th Shogakukan Manga Award for the shōnen category.

== Premise ==
On her first day attending the elite Itan Private High School, Shoko Komi immediately receives an overwhelming surge in popularity due to the unprecedented stoic beauty and refined elegance her classmates perceive her to possess. However, only Hitohito Tadano, an exceedingly average schoolboy who sits next to her, discovers that behind her bishōjo appearance, Komi has a severe communication disorder. Tadano learns that Komi's goal is to make 100 friends, and resolves to help her reach her goal.

== Media ==
=== Manga ===
Written and illustrated by Tomohito Oda, Komi Can't Communicate was first published as a one-shot in Shogakukan's shōnen manga magazine Weekly Shōnen Sunday on September 16, 2015; the manga was later serialized in the same magazine from May 18, 2016, to January 29, 2025. Shogakukan collected its chapters in 37 tankōbon volumes, released from September 16, 2016, to March 18, 2025. A new chapter showing Tadano and Komi's college life was published in Weekly Shōnen Sunday on June 17, 2026.

In November 2018, during their panel at Anime NYC, Viz Media announced that it had licensed the series for English release in North America. The 37 volumes were released from June 11, 2019, to March 10, 2026. On May 9, 2023, Viz Media launched their Viz Manga digital manga service, with the series's chapters receiving simultaneous English publication in North America as they were released in Japan.

=== Drama ===
An eight-episode live-action television drama adaptation was broadcast on NHK General TV from September 6 to November 1, 2021. Aiko performed the series's theme song "Atashitachi" (あたしたち; "We").

=== Anime ===
On May 11, 2021, an anime television series adaptation by OLM was announced. The series was directed by Kazuki Kawagoe, with Ayumu Watanabe serving as chief director, scripts by Deko Akao, character designs by Atsuko Nakajima and music by Yukari Hashimoto. The series aired on TV Tokyo from October 7 to December 23, 2021. (Note: TV Tokyo listed the air dates for the series on Wednesday at 24:00, which is effectively Thursday at midnight JST.) Netflix streamed the series worldwide on a weekly basis starting on October 21, 2021. Cider Girl performed the opening theme "Cinderella", while Kitri performed the ending theme "Sympathy" (シンパシー, Shinpashī) in episode 1, and the ending theme "Hikare Inochi" (ヒカレイノチ; 'Shine, Life') from episodes 2–12.

On December 23, 2021, Netflix announced the series would receive a second season. It aired from April 7 to June 23, 2022, in Japan, (Note: TV Tokyo listed the air dates for the series on Wednesday at 24:00, which is effectively Thursday at midnight JST.) and premiered worldwide on Netflix on April 27 of the same year. Miku Itō performed the opening theme "Ao 100-iro" (青100色; '100 Blue Colors'), while FantasticYouth performed the ending theme "Koshaberi Biyori" (小喋日和; 'Fine Day for Small Talk').

On December 12, 2022, the official Komi Can't Communicate Twitter account announced that the anime production team did retakes of the animation for episodes in both seasons that had already been streamed on Netflix.

== Reception ==
=== Manga ===
==== Sales and accolades ====
By September 2018, the manga had over 2 million copies in circulation; 5.2 million copies in circulation by February 2021; over 6 million copies in circulation by December 2021; over 7.4 million copies in circulation by June 2022; over 12.7 million copies in circulation by July 2023; over 14 million copies in circulation by February 2024; and over 16 million copies in circulation by January 2025.

In 2017, the series ranked eighth in the third Next Manga Award in the print category. Polygon named the manga as one of the best comics of 2019. It won the 67th Shogakukan Manga Award in the shōnen category in 2022.

In 2020, the series topped the "Most Wanted Anime Adaptation" poll conducted by AnimeJapan.

==== Critical response ====
In a review of the first volume from Anime News Network, Rebecca Silverman described the series as a "a nice little story with humor and a distinct lack of cruelty that doesn't break any new barriers but is definitely fun to read." Faye Hopper questioned whether the humor stemmed from Komi's "absurd behavior" or a relatable portrayal of social anxiety. Hopper criticized Najimi's character as a "transphobic punchline", calling jokes about their gender fluidity "extremely tasteless" and detrimental to the series's message. However, Hopper acknowledged its success despite its flaws, praising its compassionate portrayal of dysfunctional characters and avoiding casting Komi as a "social outlier". Gabe Peralta of The Fandom Post noted that much of the series's humor arises from others misinterpreting Komi's silence. He described it as "wholesomely silly" with "a bit of fanservice worked in" that fits within the manga's tone, despite some characters' awkwardness. Peralta concluded that the series is "basic in premise, but slightly more nuanced in execution".

Reviewing the first volume, Leroy Douresseaux of Comic Book Bin described the series as a shōnen and shōjo mix that "offer[s] readers young male and female characters forced together for a common goal, with some romantic elements", noting, however, that it is not its central focus, also calling Oda as "quite adept at creating small situations out of this narrative's central conceit." In her review of the first volume, Sheena McNeil of Sequential Tart praised the story, characters, and humour, calling it "a hidden gem, definitely worth checking out". McNeil, however, criticized some of Komi and Tadano's interactions with other classmates. Morgana Santilli of The Beat made a positive review of the series, praising its premise, comedy, characters, and the relationship between Komi and Tadano, calling it "cute and fun, something that injects a little positivity into a world that frequently seems to shun collaborative efforts to help others".

=== Anime ===
==== Critical response ====
IGN included the series on their "Best New Anime to Watch (Fall Season 2021)" list. Isaiah Colbert of Kotaku included the series on the "11 Best Anime of 2021" list, praising it for its comedy and for addressing the issue of social anxiety.

==== Accolades ====
The series won Best Comedy at the 6th Crunchyroll Anime Awards. It was also nominated for Best Romance while Shoko Komi was nominated for Best Girl, but lost to Horimiya and Nobara Kugisaki from Jujutsu Kaisen, respectively. The second season was nominated at the seventh edition in three categories: "Must Protect at All Costs" Character (Shoko Komi), Best Romance, and Best Ending Sequence ("Koshaberi Biyori" by FantasticYouth).
