= Horimiya (TV series) =

Japanese anime television series

- Genre: Romance; comedy
- Based on: Horimiya by Daisuke Hagiwara
- Written by: Takao Yoshioka
- Directed by: Masashi Ishihama
- Voices of: Koki Uchiyama; Haruka Tomatsu
- Opening theme: "Iro Kōsui"; by Yoh Kamiyama
- Ending theme: "Yakusoku"; by Friends
- Composer: Masaru Yokoyama
- Country of origin: Japan
- Original languages: Japanese; English
- No. of seasons: 1
- No. of episodes: 13 (list of episodes)

Production
- Animator: CloverWorks
- Production company: Aniplex

Original release
- Network: MBS
- Release: January 10 – April 4, 2021

Related
- Horimiya: The Missing Pieces

Horimiya (Note: Japanese: ホリミヤ, Hepburn: Horimiya) is a 2021 Japanese anime television series co-created by the Japanese entertainment company Aniplex and the Japanese animation studio CloverWorks. It is based on Daisuke Hagiwara's Horimiya manga series adaptation of HERO's webcomic Hori-san to Miyamura-kun. The story follows the growing relationship of two high school students, Kyouko Hori and Izumi Miyamura.

The first season consisted of 13 episodes and ran from January to April 2021, on the MBS television station. A sequel anime adaptation titled Horimiya: The Missing Pieces that covered chapters not animated in Horimiya was announced after the airing of the thirteenth episode. It aired from July to September 2023.

== Series overview ==
Season	Episodes	Originally released	
Season	Episodes	First released	Last released
1	13	January 10, 2021	April 4, 2021

== Plot ==
The plot centers on the developing relationship between two high school students, the popular and outwardly cheerful Kyouko Hori, and the quiet and reserved Izumi Miyamura. Outside of school, the pair are complete opposites of their public personas. A chance encounter after school leads them to discover each other's secret selves, forming a bond that blossoms into a romance.

== Cast and characters ==
Character	Japanese	English
Izumi Miyamura (宮村 伊澄)	Koki Uchiyama	Alejandro Saab
Kyouko Hori (堀 京子)	Haruka Tomatsu	Marisa Duran
Toru Ishikawa (石川 透)	Seiichiro Yamashita	Zeno Robinson
Yuki Yoshikawa (吉川 由紀)	Yurie Kozakai	Anairis Quiñones
Yuriko Hori (堀 百合子)	Ai Kayano	Marissa Lenti
Akane Yanagi (茜 柳)	Jun Fukuyama	Johnny Yong Bosch
Shū Iura (井浦秀)	Daiki Yamashita	Y. Chang
Sakura Kōno (河野さくら)	Reina Kondo	Celeste Perez
Kakeru Sengoku (かける 戦国)	Nobuhiko Okamoto	Belsheber Rusape
Remi Ayasaki (綾崎レミ)	Mao Ichimichi	Jalitza Delgado
Sawada Honoka (沢田 ほのか)	Momo Asakura	Apphia Yu
Kyosuke Hori (堀 京介)	Daisuke Ono	Bill Butts
Sota Hori (堀 創太)	Yuka Terasaki	Emily Fajardo
Koichi Shindo (進藤 晃一)	Taku Yashiro	Christopher Llewyn Ramirez

== Media ==
The anime series was announced on September 17, 2020. The series was animated by CloverWorks and directed by Masashi Ishihama, with Takao Yoshioka handling series' composition, Haruko Iizuka designing the characters, and Masaru Yokoyama composing the series' music. It aired from January 10 to April 4, 2021, on Tokyo MX and other channels. The opening theme song is "Iro Kōsui" (色香水; "Color Perfume") performed by Yoh Kamiyama, while the ending theme song is "Yakusoku" (約束; "Promise") performed by Friends.

Funimation streamed the series on its website in North America, the British Isles, Mexico, and Brazil, in Europe through Wakanim, and in Australia and New Zealand through AnimeLab. On February 5, 2021, Funimation announced that the series would be receiving an English dub, which premiered the next day. Following Sony's acquisition of Crunchyroll, the series was moved to Crunchyroll. Medialink has licensed the series in Southeast Asia and South Asia, and streamed it on Bilibili only in Southeast Asia. The company later began streaming the first episode on their Ani-One YouTube channel for a limited time, from February 13 to March 15, 2021. They also licensed the anime to Animax Asia for TV airing.

== Reception ==
=== Awards and nominations ===
Year	Award	Category	Recipient	Result	Ref.
2022	6th Crunchyroll Anime Awards	Best Boy	Izumi Miyamura	Nominated	
2022	6th Crunchyroll Anime Awards	Best Romance	Horimiya	Won	
