= Omoinotake =

Japanese pop rock band

Omoinotake オモイノタケ
- Origin: Matsue, Shimane Prefecture, Japan
- Genre: J-pop • city pop • rock
- Labels: Neon Records; Sony Music
- Members: Reo Fujii; Tomoaki Fukushima; Hironoshin Tomita
- Website: omoinotake.com

Omoinotake (オモイノタケ) is a Japanese band formed in 2012 in Matsue, Shimane Prefecture by vocalist/keyboardist Reo Fujii, bassist Tomoaki Fukushima, and drummer Hironoshin Tomita. They are perhaps best known for their songs "Everblue", used as the opening theme for the anime Blue Period, and "Ikuokukonen", which peaked at No. 2 on the Billboard Japan Hot 100.

== History ==
Omoinotake was formed in 2012 by Reo Fujii, Tomoaki Fukushima, and Hironoshin Tomita in Matsue, Shimane Prefecture. After performing locally around Shibuya for several years, the band released their debut album, So far, in 2017 on the independent label Neon Records.

In 2020, Omoinotake performed the opening theme song "Ubugoe (産声)" for the television series adaptation of Cherry Magic! Thirty Years of Virginity Can Make You a Wizard?!. The band also provided the theme song "Heartbeat" (心音, Shinon) for the film sequel to the series in 2022.

After signing to Sony Music in 2021, they released their debut major label album, Ammolite, in September 2023. It contained their previously released singles "Everblue", the opening theme for the anime adaption of the manga Blue Period, and "Happiness" (幸せ, Shiawase), the opening theme for the anime Horimiya: The Missing Pieces.

In 2024, the band released the single "Billions of Light Years" (or "Ikuokukonen"), used for the TV show Eye Love You. According to Fukushima, the song was originally going to be named "Thousands of Light Years", but the band decided against it after considering that one billion light years was more of an unimaginable distance. The song has since peaked at No. 2 on the Billboard Japan Hot 100, In April 2024, it was announced that Omoinotake would perform the ending theme song "Tsubomi" (蕾) for the seventh season of the anime My Hero Academia.

In 2025, the single "Better Half" with Jeonghan of K-pop group Seventeen, was released on 27 January, sung entirely in Korean. A Japanese version of the song was included in the band's second major album, Pieces, released on 29 January, accommodated by a national hall tour. In March 2025, it was announced that Omoinotake will perform the second ending theme song "Hitorigoto" (ひとりごと) for the second season of the anime The Apothecary Diaries. They announced their one-off Nippon Budokan live, scheduled for March 15, 2026.

== Discography ==
=== Albums ===
- So Far (2017)
- Ammolite (2023)
- Pieces (2025)
- Memorabilia (Sep 2026)

=== EPs ===
- Beside (2017)
- Street Light (2018)
- Moratorium (モラトリアム) (2020)
- Long For (2020)
- Everblue (2021)
- Dear Decade, (2022)

=== Singles ===
- "Stand Alone" (2018)
- "Planet" (惑星) (2019)
- "Blanco" (2019)
- "Tonica" (トニカ) (2019)
- "Missing" (欠伸) (2020)
- "One Day" (2020)
- "Natsu no Maboroshi" (夏の幻) (2020)
- "Ubugoe" (産声) (2020)
- "By My Side" (2021)
- "Kanata" (彼方) (2021)
- "Prequel" (プリクエル) (2021)
- "Everblue" (2021)
- "Heartbeat" (心音, Shinon) (2022)
- "Utsusemi" (空蝉) (2022)
- "Custom-made" (オーダーメイド, Ōdāmeido) (2023)
- "Uzumaku" (渦幕) (2023)
- "Happiness" (幸せ, Shiawase) (2023)
- "Billions of Light Years" (幾億光年, Ikuokukonen) (2024)
- "Tsubomi" (蕾) (2024)
- "Last Note" (ラストノート) (2024)
- "Iolite" (アイオライト) (2024)
- "Better Half" (feat. Jeonghan of Seventeen) (2025)
- "Hitorigoto" (ひとりごと) (2025)
- "Fake Show" (フェイクショー) (2025)
