= Horimiya: The Missing Pieces =

Japanese anime television series

- Genre: Romance; Comedy
- Based on: Horimiya by Daisuke Hagiwara
- Directed by: Masashi Ishihama
- Voices of: Koki Uchiyama; Haruka Tomatsu
- Opening theme: "Shiawase"; by Omoinotake
- Ending theme: "URL"; by Ami Sakaguchi
- Composer: Masaru Yokoyama
- Country of origin: Japan
- Original languages: Japanese; English
- No. of seasons: 1
- No. of episodes: 13

Production
- Animator: CloverWorks
- Production company: Aniplex

Original release
- Release: July 1 – September 23, 2023

Related
- Horimiya

Horimiya: The Missing Pieces (Note: Japanese: ホリミヤ -piece-, Hepburn: Horimiya: Pīsu) is a Japanese anime television series produced by CloverWorks, based on Daisuke Hagiwara's Horimiya manga series adaptation of HERO's webcomic Hori-san to Miyamura-kun. The series aired for 13 episodes, from July to September 2023. It centers on the developing relationship between two students, Kyouko Hori and Izumi Miyamura.

== Media ==
Horimiya: The Missing Pieces was first announced at AnimeJapan on March 25, 2023. It adapts chapters from the manga that were not adapted in the previous anime. The series aired from July 1 to September 23, 2023. The opening theme song is "Shiawase" (幸せ; "Happiness") performed by Omoinotake, while the ending theme song is "URL" performed by Ami Sakaguchi. Crunchyroll streamed the series under the title Horimiya: The Missing Pieces.

== Episodes ==
No.	Title (Note: All English titles are taken from Crunchyroll.)	Directed by	Written by	Original release date
1	"Class Trip"; Transliteration: "Shūgakuryokō" (Japanese: 修学旅行)	Masashi Ishihama	Takao Yoshioka	July 1, 2023
2	"Cooking Class"; Transliteration: "Chōri Jisshū" (Japanese: 調理実習)	Akihisa Shibata	Chiaki Nagai	July 8, 2023
3	"Sports Day"; Transliteration: "Taiikusai" (Japanese: 体育祭)	Kenjirou Okada	Sawako Hirabayashi	July 15, 2023
4	"Hori Kotatsu" (Japanese: 堀こたつ)	Ryō Kodama	Takao Yoshioka	July 22, 2023
5	"Iura" (Japanese: 井浦)	Yasuo Ejima	Chiaki Nagai	July 29, 2023
6	"Sleepover"; Transliteration: "Otomarikai" (Japanese: お泊り会)	Shōgo Ono, Yui Ikari	Sawako Hirabayashi	August 5, 2023
7	"Friends"; Transliteration: "Tomodachi" (Japanese: 友達)	Masashi Ishihama	Takao Yoshioka	August 12, 2023
8	"Yanagi-kun" (Japanese: 柳くん)	Kakushi Ifuku	Chiaki Nagai	August 19, 2023
9	"Teacher"; Transliteration: "Sensei" (Japanese: 先生)	Jun Takahashi	Sawako Hirabayashi	August 26, 2023
10	"Jealousy"; Transliteration: "Yakimochi" (Japanese: やきもち)	Akihisa Shibata	Takao Yoshioka	September 2, 2023
11	"Chocolate"; Transliteration: "Chokorēto" (Japanese: チョコレート)	Tsurumi Mukōyama	Chiaki Nagai	September 9, 2023
12	"The Hori House"; Transliteration: "Hori-ke" (Japanese: 堀家)	Yasuo Ejima	Sawako Hirabayashi	September 16, 2023
13	"Graduation"; Transliteration: "Sotsugyō" (Japanese: 卒業)	Masashi Ishihama	Takao Yoshioka	September 23, 2023

== Reception ==
=== Awards and nominations ===
Year	Award	Category	Recipient	Result	Ref.
2024	8th Crunchyroll Anime Awards	Best Romance	Horimiya: The Missing Pieces	Won	
2024	8th Crunchyroll Anime Awards	Best Slice of Life	Horimiya: The Missing Pieces	Nominated	
