= Wakanim =

Defunct European anime streaming service

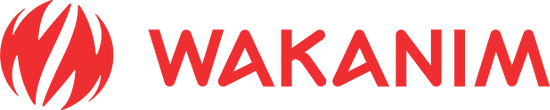
- Logo of the streaming service from 2015 to 2023
- Website type: Subsidiary
- Available in: 4 languages
- List of languages: English; French; German; Russian
- Dissolved: 3 November 2023; 2 years ago
- Headquarters: Tourcoing, {{{location_country}}}
- Country of origin: France
- Area served: European Union, CIS Region, Quebec, North Africa, Nordics
- Founders: Olivier Cervantès; Ludovic Alcala; Jonathan Fontaine
- President: Olivier Cervantes
- Industry: Entertainment
- Products: Streaming media; video on demand; digital distribution
- Services: Film distribution; Television distribution
- Revenue: €713,600 – 2013
- Employees: 6 to 9 – 2018
- Parent: Aniplex (2015–2019); Crunchyroll, LLC (2019–2023)
- Website: www.wakanim.tv
- Launched: 27 February 2009; 17 years ago
- Current status: Defunct; operations folded into Crunchyroll.

Wakanim was a French subscription video on-demand over-the-top streaming service. (Note: The streaming service at that time was operated by its parent company Crunchyroll, LLC, a joint venture of Sony Group Corporation's two subsidiaries: Sony Pictures Entertainment and Sony Music Entertainment Japan (through Aniplex) until its shutdown in 2023.)

The service specialized in online streaming and simulcasting of Japanese anime series. It was also the first platform to offer videos for download without digital rights management on anime series in Europe. The service was discontinued on 3 November 2023.

== History ==
Wakanim was launched on 27 February 2009 after YouTube appeared in France in 2007, and broadcast its first series in October 2010, The World God Only Knows. The aim was to launch simultaneous broadcasting (simulcast) of animated series with Japan, as the French market of the Japanese animation did not yet have an adapted legal offer and that it suffered from piracy (fansub).

In October 2013, Wakanim began expanding overseas, with the service extended to the United Kingdom in partnership with British distributor Anime Limited. Wakanim UK was later discontinued in 2014, with Space Dandy being the final title simulcasted in the region.

In July 2014, Wakanim announced a new service called Wakanim Music which is about Asian music news and would offer music streaming. It was launched in February 2015 but the service is no longer available.

In March 2015, Aniplex became the company's main shareholder, allowing for Aniplex to enter the French market, and strengthen its European presence. From 2017, Wakanim began expanding internationally. In June 2017, Wakanim established an English-subtitled version for the Nordic countries. In September 2017, Wakanim announced that it would be available for the German-speaking regions with subtitles and dubs in cooperation with the AkibaPass service. In January 2018, Wakanim further expanded by launching a Russian service for Russian-speaking countries and regions. In April 2020, Wakanim expanded its English language service to the Netherlands, with select titles from Wakanim Nordic's catalogue being made available.

In October 2016, Wakanim offered their first simultaneous French dub with Drifters, in partnership with the French television channel J-One.

On 24 September 2019, Aniplex and Sony Pictures Television announced that they were consolidating their international anime streaming businesses, with a new joint venture, Funimation Global Group, LLC., with Funimation general manager Colin Decker leading the joint venture. The joint venture would operate under Funimation's branding, and allow Funimation to acquire and distribute titles with Aniplex subsidiaries Wakanim, Madman Anime Group and AnimeLab. The first title under the joint venture, Fate/Grand Order - Absolute Demonic Front: Babylonia, would receive a 30-day exclusivity on FunimationNow, AnimeLab and Wakanim, and provide Funimation exclusive rights to the English dub for one year. Following the merger, Wakanim began offering Funimation SimulDubs in its English language service.

On 1 March 2022, it was announced that Wakanim, alongside VRV's and Funimation's SVOD service, would be consolidated into Crunchyroll.

On 11 March 2022, Crunchyroll and Wakanim announced that they would suspend their services in Russia due to the 2022 Russian invasion of Ukraine.

On 19 September 2023, Wakanim announced that it would be ceasing operations on 3 November 2023, with all content being merged into Crunchyroll.

== Features ==
The videos are DRM protected which the playback takes place via a proprietary HTML5 player called JW-Player version 8.11.8 (as of February 2020). In June 2015, they announced a revamp version of their website which in October they started to use the new HTML 5 player instead of Flash. Wakanim also have apps for Xbox One, PlayStation 4, Windows 10, Apple TV, Amazon Fire TV, iOS and Android platforms. The iOS and Android versions have an offline mode, in which it is possible to download videos and watch them later without internet access.

== Availability ==
=== Subscription ===
When Wakanim's service was launched, the accessible episodes of series were broadcast in simulcast with Japan on the Internet, in paid mode (by streaming or download without DRM) and at the same time free of charge for seven days (streaming or download with DRM) after the first broadcast. In March 2016, Wakanim offered access to its catalog with a monthly subscription.

In June 2017, they changed the way their different offers work. The episodes of the new series are broadcast in simulcast with Japan and are reserved for accounts with a subscription, called "VIP members", during the week following their broadcast. The episodes are offered with the best possible quality (up to 4K) and without ads, and after a week, free members can access it with SD quality (480p) and some ads. The old series are available for everyone but with a quality that varies according to the type of account, up to 4K and without ads for VIP members and in SD (480p) with ads for free members.

In September 2018, they started to offer three-monthly and annually subscription.

=== Area served ===
Wakanim offered series and films which were geographically restricted according to the selected language:

- Content in English was available in Sweden, Norway, Iceland, Finland, and Denmark.
- Content in French was available in France and its overseas departments and territories, Belgium, Luxembourg, the Netherlands, Switzerland, Tunisia, Morocco, Algeria and Quebec.
- Content in German was available in Germany, Austria and Switzerland.
- Content in Russian was available in Albania, Armenia, Azerbaijan, Belarus, Bosnia and Herzegovina, Bulgaria, Croatia, Cyprus, Czech Republic, Georgia, Hungary, Kazakhstan, Latvia, Lithuania, Moldova, North Macedonia, Poland, Romania, Russia, San Marino, Serbia, Slovakia, Slovenia and Ukraine.
