= CloverWorks =

Japanese animation studio

CloverWorks Inc.
- Logo used since its establishment in 2018, featuring a four-leaf clover

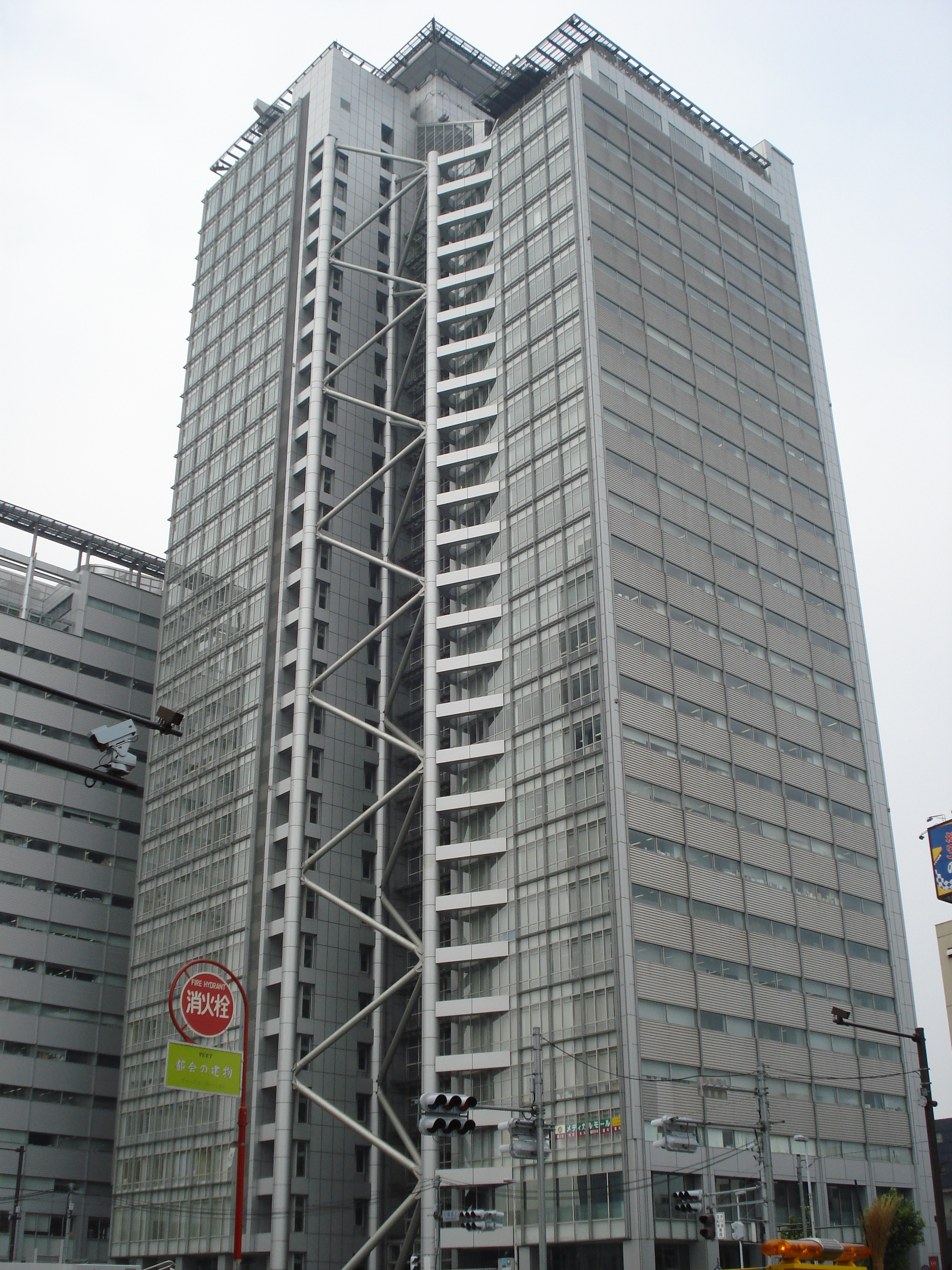
- Headquarters in Nakano, Tokyo
- Native name: 株式会社CloverWorks
- Romanized name: Kabushiki-gaisha KurōbāWākusu
- Type: Subsidiary
- Industry: Japanese animation
- Predecessor: A-1 Pictures Kōenji Studio
- Founded: October 1, 2018; 8 years ago
- Headquarters: Nakano-Sakaue Sunbright Twin 30F, 2-46-1 Honcho, Nakano, Tokyo, Japan
- Key people: Tomonori Ochikoshi (chairman); Akira Shimizu (president); Yuichi Fukushima (executive vice president)
- Number of employees: 258 (As of February 2026)
- Parent: Aniplex
- Website: cloverworks.co.jp

CloverWorks Inc. is a Japanese animation studio headquartered in Nakano, Tokyo. It was initially an internal division of its sister studio A-1 Pictures until 2018, when it was spun off as a separate entity. It is a subsidiary of the anime production company Aniplex. The studio is best known for producing popular anime series and films including Darling in the Franxx (2018), Rascal Does Not Dream (2018), The Promised Neverland (2019), Horimiya (2021), Spy × Family (2022), and Bocchi the Rock! (2022).

== History ==
In April 2018, A-1 Pictures rebranded its Kōenji Studio as CloverWorks, which has a unique brand identity, distinguishable from its main Asagaya Studio. The studio is based in Suginami, Tokyo. Following the rebranding, four anime productions have changed the studio credited from A-1 Pictures to CloverWorks: Slow Start, Darling in the Franxx, Persona 5: The Animation, and Ace Attorney Season 2. Slow Start changed the credited studio after the original run ended, while Darling in the Franxx changed the credited studio during production. CloverWorks later announced that it had separated from A-1 Pictures in October 2018, although it remained as a subsidiary of Aniplex.

In May 2022, CloverWorks, in joint collaboration with Aniplex, Wit Studio, and Shueisha, established the production company JOEN in order to streamline the production and planning of various media of anime, as well as provide a better business model between the animation studios involved.

== Works ==
=== Television series ===
Title	Broadcast channel	First run start date	First run end date	Director	Eps	Note(s)	Ref.
Slow Start	Tokyo MX	January 7, 2018	March 25, 2018	Hiroyuki Hashimoto	12	Based on the 4-panel manga by Yuiko Tokumi.	(Note: Slow Start, Persona 5 The Animation, and the second season of Ace Attorney was originally credited to A-1 Pictures. However, the credit was transferred to CloverWorks after their separation from the studio in October 2018.)
Darling in the Franxx	Tokyo MX	January 13, 2018	July 7, 2018	Atsushi Nishigori	24	Original work. Co-production with Trigger and A-1 Pictures.	
Persona 5: The Animation	Tokyo MX	April 8, 2018	September 30, 2018	Masashi Ishihama	26	Based on the Persona 5 video game by Atlus.	
Rascal Does Not Dream of Bunny Girl Senpai	ABC	October 4, 2018	December 27, 2018	Sōichi Masui	13	Based on the psychological light novel written by Hajime Kamoshida.	
Dakaichi	Tokyo MX	October 5, 2018	December 28, 2018	Naoyuki Tatsuwa	13	Based on the yaoi manga by Hashigo Sakurabi.	
Ace Attorney (season 2)	NNS (ytv)	October 6, 2018	March 30, 2019	Ayumu Watanabe	23	Sequel to Ace Attorney.	
Fairy Tail (season 3)	TXN (TV Tokyo)	October 7, 2018	September 29, 2019	Shinji Ishihira	51	Final season of Fairy Tail. Co-production with A-1 Pictures and Bridge.	
The Promised Neverland (season 1)	Fuji TV (Noitamina)	January 11, 2019	March 29, 2019	Mamoru Kanbe	12	Based on the thriller manga written by Kaiu Shirai.	
Fate/Grand Order – Absolute Demonic Front: Babylonia	Tokyo MX	October 5, 2019	March 21, 2020	Toshifumi Akai	21	Based on the smartphone game Fate/Grand Order developed by Delightworks.	
Auto Boy - Carl from Mobile Land	NHK-E	April 2, 2020	March 24, 2022	Shinobu Sasaki	104	Original work. Multimedia kids project by Aniplex and Sony Music Entertainment Japan.	
The Millionaire Detective Balance: Unlimited	Fuji TV (Noitamina)	April 9, 2020	September 24, 2020	Tomohiko Ito	11	Based on the detective novel series written by Yasutaka Tsutsui.	
The Promised Neverland (season 2)	Fuji TV (Noitamina)	January 8, 2021	March 26, 2021	Mamoru Kanbe	11	Sequel to The Promised Neverland.	
Horimiya	Tokyo MX	January 10, 2021	April 4, 2021	Masashi Ishihama	13	Based on the romantic comedy manga written by Hero.	
Wonder Egg Priority	NNS (Nippon TV)	January 13, 2021	March 31, 2021	Shin Wakabayashi	12	Original work.	
Shadows House (season 1)	Tokyo MX	April 11, 2021	July 4, 2021	Kazuki Ohashi	13	Based on the supernatural manga by Somato.	
Tokyo 24th Ward	Tokyo MX	January 6, 2022	April 7, 2022	Naokatsu Tsuda	12	Original work.	
My Dress-Up Darling (season 1)	Tokyo MX	January 9, 2022	March 27, 2022	Keisuke Shinohara	12	Based on the romantic comedy manga by Shinichi Fukuda.	
Akebi's Sailor Uniform	Tokyo MX	January 9, 2022	March 27, 2022	Miyuki Kuroki	12	Based on the slice of life manga by Hiro.	
Spy × Family (season 1)	TV Tokyo	April 9, 2022	December 24, 2022	Kazuhiro Furuhashi	25	Based on the action comedy manga by Tatsuya Endo. Co-production with Wit Studio.	
In the Heart of Kunoichi Tsubaki	Tokyo MX	April 10, 2022	July 3, 2022	Takudai Kakuchi	13	Based on the comedy manga by Sōichirō Yamamoto.	
Shadows House (season 2)	Tokyo MX	July 9, 2022	September 24, 2022	Kazuki Ohashi	12	Sequel to Shadows House.	
Bocchi the Rock! (season 1)	Tokyo MX	October 9, 2022	December 25, 2022	Keiichirō Saitō	12	Based on the 4-panel manga by Aki Hamazi.	
UniteUp!	Tokyo MX	January 7, 2023	April 15, 2023	Shinichiro Ushijima	12	Based on a multimedia project by Sony Music Entertainment Japan.	
Horimiya: The Missing Pieces	Tokyo MX	July 1, 2023	September 23, 2023	Masashi Ishihama	13	Related to Horimiya.	
Spy × Family (season 2)	TV Tokyo	October 7, 2023	December 23, 2023	Kazuhiro Furuhashi; Takahiro Harada	12	Sequel to Spy × Family. Co-production with Wit Studio.	
Wind Breaker (season 1)	JNN (MBS, TBS)	April 5, 2024	June 28, 2024	Toshifumi Akai	13	Based on the yankī manga by Satoru Nii.	
Black Butler: Public School Arc	Tokyo MX	April 13, 2024	June 22, 2024	Kenjirou Okada	11	Based on the dark comedy manga by Yana Toboso.	
The Elusive Samurai (season 1)	Tokyo MX	July 6, 2024	September 28, 2024	Yuta Yamazaki	12	Based on the historical fantasy manga by Yusei Matsui.	
I May Be a Guild Receptionist, But I'll Solo Any Boss to Clock Out on Time	Tokyo MX	January 11, 2025	March 29, 2025	Tsuyoshi Nagasawa	12	Based on the fantasy comedy light novel written by Mato Kousaka.	
UniteUp! Uni:Birth	Tokyo MX	January 11, 2025	April 5, 2025	Shinichiro Ushijima	12	Sequel to UniteUp!	
Wind Breaker (season 2)	JNN (MBS, TBS)	April 4, 2025	June 20, 2025	Toshifumi Akai	12	Sequel to Wind Breaker.	
Black Butler: Emerald Witch Arc	Tokyo MX	April 5, 2025	June 28, 2025	Kenjirou Okada	13	Sequel to Black Butler: Public School Arc.	
Rascal Does Not Dream of Santa Claus	Tokyo MX	July 5, 2025	September 27, 2025	Sōichi Masui	13	Sequel to Rascal Does Not Dream of a Knapsack Kid.	
My Dress-Up Darling (season 2)	Tokyo MX	July 6, 2025	September 21, 2025	Keisuke Shinohara	12	Sequel to My Dress-Up Darling.	
The Fragrant Flower Blooms with Dignity	Tokyo MX	July 6, 2025	September 28, 2025	Miyuki Kuroki	13	Based on the romantic comedy manga by Saka Mikami.	
Spy × Family (season 3)	TV Tokyo	October 4, 2025	December 27, 2025	Yukiko Imai	13	Sequel to the second season of Spy × Family. Co-production with Wit Studio.	
The Elusive Samurai (season 2)	Fuji TV (Noitamina)	July 17, 2026	October 2, 2026	Yuta Yamazaki	12	Sequel to The Elusive Samurai.	
The Guy She Was Interested in Wasn't a Guy at All	Nippon TV (Friday Anime Night)	January 8, 2027	TBA	Masashi Ishihama	TBA	Based on the yuri manga by Sumiko Arai.	
The Case Files of Biblia Bookstore	TBA	April 2027	TBA	Mamoru Kanbe	TBA	Based on the mystery light novel written by En Mikami.	
Spy × Family (season 4)	TBA	2027	TBA	Yasuhiro Akamatsu	TBA	Sequel to the third season of Spy × Family. Co-production with Wit Studio.	
Bocchi the Rock! (season 2)	TBA	TBA	TBA	Yūsuke Yamamoto	TBA	Sequel to Bocchi the Rock!.	
Untitled Neon Genesis Evangelion anime series	TBA	TBA	TBA	Kazuya Tsurumaki; Toko Yatabe	TBA	Related to Neon Genesis Evangelion. Co-production with Studio Khara.	

=== Films ===
Title	Director	Release date	Note(s)	Ref.
Rascal Does Not Dream of a Dreaming Girl	Sōichi Masui	June 15, 2019	Sequel to Rascal Does Not Dream of Bunny Girl Senpai.	
Her Blue Sky	Tatsuyuki Nagai	October 11, 2019	Original work.	
Saekano the Movie: Finale	Akihisa Shibata	October 26, 2019	Sequel to Saekano: How to Raise a Boring Girlfriend Flat.	
Fate/Grand Order: Final Singularity-Grand Temple of Time: Solomon	Toshifumi Akai	July 30, 2021	Sequel to Fate/Grand Order - Absolute Demonic Front: Babylonia.	
Dakaichi: Spain Arc	Naoyuki Tatsuwa	October 9, 2021	Sequel to Dakaichi.	
Rascal Does Not Dream of a Sister Venturing Out	Sōichi Masui	June 23, 2023	Sequel to Rascal Does Not Dream of a Dreaming Girl.	
Rascal Does Not Dream of a Knapsack Kid	Sōichi Masui	December 1, 2023	Sequel to Rascal Does Not Dream of a Sister Venturing Out.	
Spy × Family Code: White	Takashi Katagiri	December 22, 2023	Related to Spy × Family. Co-production with Wit Studio.	
Trapezium	Masahiro Shinohara	May 10, 2024	Based on a coming-of-age novel by Kazumi Takayama.	
Bocchi the Rock! Re:	Keiichirō Saitō	June 7, 2024	Compilation films of Bocchi the Rock!.	
Bocchi the Rock! Re:Re:	Keiichirō Saitō	August 9, 2024	Compilation films of Bocchi the Rock!.	
Fureru	Tatsuyuki Nagai	October 4, 2024	Original work.	
Rascal Does Not Dream of a Dear Friend	Sōichi Masui	October 16, 2026	Sequel to Rascal Does Not Dream of Santa Claus.	
Grotesqqque	Atsushi Nishigori	November 6, 2026	Original work.	
Eiga Bocchi the Rock! Hoshi no Ashiato	Shin Wakabayashi	2027	Prequel to Bocchi the Rock!.	
Pokémon: Wild Card	Katsuhiko Kitada	2027	24th animated film of the Pokémon franchise.	

=== ONAs/OVAs ===
Title	Director	Release start date	Release end date	Eps	Note(s)	Ref.
The Diary of Our Days	Shin Wakabayashi	March 28, 2018	November 12, 2018	8	A slice-of-life shorts series about daily life fragments of various characters from the idol group 22/7.	
Persona 5: The Animation - Proof of Justice	Masashi Ishihama	May 29, 2019	May 29, 2019	1	OVA episode bundled with the 11th Blu-ray volume of Persona 5: The Animation.	
Persona 5: The Animation - A Magical Valentine's Day	Masashi Ishihama	June 26, 2019	June 26, 2019	1	OVA episode bundled with the 12th Blu-ray volume of Persona 5: The Animation.	
Sakura Wars ~Sakura Kakumei ~Hana Saku Otome-tachi~	Yūki Itō	September 2, 2020	September 2, 2020	1	Promotional ONA for a new mobile Sakura Wars game.	
Powerful Pro Yakyū Powerful Kōkō-hen	Tetsuaki Watanabe	March 20, 2021	April 3, 2021	4	Based on the Jikkyō Powerful Pro Yakyū smartphone game developed by Konami.	
VOY@GER	Atsushi Nishigori	August 25, 2021	August 25, 2021	1	16th anniversary commemoration to The Idolmaster franchise. Co-production with Studio Khara.	
7FATES: CHAKHO	Katsuhiko Kitada	April 3, 2025	April 3, 2025	1	Based on webtoons by Hybe.	
The Star Seekers	Chikara Sakurai	April 3, 2025	April 3, 2025	1	Based on webtoons by Hybe.	
The Diary of Our Days – Day 9	Shin Wakabayashi	September 7, 2025	September 7, 2025	1	Additional episode to The Diary of Our Days.	

=== Video games ===
Title	Publisher	Release date	Note(s)	Ref.
Wild Arms: Million Memories	ForwardWorks	September 26, 2018	Opening animation	
Persona Q2: New Cinema Labyrinth	Sega	November 29, 2018	Opening animation	
Touhou Cannonball	Aniplex	October 1, 2019	Opening animation	
Atri: My Dear Moments	Aniplex	June 19, 2020	Promotional animation	
The Idolmaster Cinderella Girls: Starlight Stage	Bandai Namco Entertainment	September 3, 2020	5th anniversary animation	
Fate/Grand Order	Aniplex	July 30, 2023	"Memorial Movie" animation	
Fate/Samurai Remnant	Koei Tecmo	September 28, 2023	Opening animation	
Gakuen Idolmaster	Bandai Namco Entertainment	May 8, 2026	"Hatsuboshi Idol Festival (HIF)" opening animation	

=== Music videos ===
Title	Singer	Release date	Note(s)	Ref.
For Kimi ni Okuru Uta	The Sxplay	April 9, 2019		
Cinderella	Ace Collection	September 3, 2019	Co-production with Maxilla.	
Tokyo Autumn Session	HoneyWorks	January 24, 2020		
Yakusoku	Eve	October 23, 2020		
Sangenshoku	Yoasobi	July 3, 2021		
Makafushigi	Gran Saga × Radwimps	October 25, 2021		
Kumorizora no Mukō wa Hareteiru	22/7	July 26, 2022		
1000-man-kai Hug Nanda	Dialogue+	December 21, 2022		
Shirayuki	Eve	December 23, 2022		
Monotone	Yoasobi	October 1, 2024	Created for Fureru. Co-production with Ijigen Tokyo.	
Kireigoto	Hoshimachi Suisei	May 19, 2025		
Kasukana Yūhi	Magical Girl holoWitches! (Note: Consisting of Amane Kanata, Sakura Miko, Himemori Luna, Houshou Marine, Shirakami Fubuki, and Yukihana Lamy)	October 17, 2025		
