= 2022 in anime =

Events in 2022 in anime.

== Releases ==
=== Films ===
A list of anime films that were released in theaters between January 1 and December 31, 2022.

Release date	Title	Studio	Director(s)	Running time (minutes)	Ref
January 1	BanG Dream! Poppin' Dream!	Sanzigen	Kōdai Kakimoto (Chief); Masanori Uetaka	72	
January 28 – February 11	The Orbital Children	Production +h	Mitsuo Iso	192	
January 30	Eien no 831	Craftar	Kenji Kamiyama	105	
February 4	Star Blazers: Space Battleship Yamato 2205: Kosho -STASHA-	Satelight	Kenji Yasuda	97	
February 4	The Deer King	Production I.G	Masashi Ando; Masayuki Miyaji	114	
February 18	Fruits Basket: Prelude	TMS Entertainment	Yoshihide Ibata	88	
February 18	Goodbye, Don Glees!	Madhouse	Atsuko Ishizuka	98	
February 25	Deemo: Memorial Keys	Production I.G; Signal.MD	Jun'ichi Fujisaku (Chief); Shūhei Matsushita	89	
March 4	Blue Thermal	Telecom Animation Film	Masaki Tachibana	103	
March 4	Doraemon: Nobita's Little Star Wars 2021	Shin-Ei Animation; Shirogumi	Susumu Yamaguchi	108	
March 4	Ensemble Stars!! Road to Show!!	David Production	Asami Nakatani (Chief); Masakazu Hishida	72	
March 4 – May 13	Legend of the Galactic Heroes: The New Thesis - Clash	Production I.G	Shunsuke Tada	300	
March 11	Shimajirō to Kirakira Ōkoku no Ōji-sama	Benesse Corporation	Takamitsu Kawamura	60	
April 1	Odd Taxi: In the Woods	OLM; P.I.C.S.	Baku Kinoshita	128	
April 15	Detective Conan: The Bride of Halloween	TMS Entertainment	Susumu Mitsunaka	110	
April 22	Crayon Shin-chan: Mononoke Ninja Chinpūden	Shin-Ei Animation	Masakazu Hashimoto	100	
April 22	Free! The Final Stroke (part 2)	Kyoto Animation	Eisaku Kawakami	106	
April 28	Bubble	Wit Studio	Tetsurō Araki	100	
April 29	Re:cycle of Penguindrum (part 1)	Lapin Track	Kunihiko Ikuhara	124	
May 20	The Quintessential Quintuplets Movie	Bibury Animation Studios	Masato Jinbo	136	
May 20 – September 1	Toku Touken Ranbu: Hanamaru ~Setsugetsuka~	Doga Kobo	Takashi Naoya; Tomoaki Koshida; Sumie Noro	216	
June 3	Mobile Suit Gundam: Cucuruz Doan's Island	Bandai Namco Filmworks	Yoshikazu Yasuhiko	108	
June 10	Isekai Quartet: The Movie – Another World	Studio Puyukai	Minoru Ashina	112	
June 10	Teasing Master Takagi-san: The Movie	Shin-Ei Animation	Hiroaki Akagi	73	
June 11	Dragon Ball Super: Super Hero	Toei Animation	Tetsuro Kodama	99	
June 24	Idol Bu Show	ORENDA; Amineworks	Shingo Kobayashi	64	
July 1	Laid-Back Camp Movie	C-Station	Yoshiaki Kyōgoku	120	
July 2	Backflip!!	Zexcs	Toshimasa Kuroyanagi	90	
July 8	Mr. Osomatsu: Hipipo-Zoku to Kagayaku Kajitsu	Pierrot	Yoshinori Odaka	68	
July 10	Dr. Stone: Ryusui	TMS Entertainment	Shūhei Matsushita	60	
July 22	Re:cycle of Penguindrum (part 2)	Lapin Track	Kunihiko Ikuhara	142	
July 31	Joshi Kōsei to Mahō no Note	Noovo	Mitsuho Seta		
August 6	One Piece Film: Red	Toei Animation	Gorō Taniguchi; Aya Komaki	115	
August 19	Tsurune: The Movie – The First Shot	Kyoto Animation	Takuya Yamamura	102	
August 22	Animation x Paralympic: Harigane Service	SynergySP	Hiroyuki Ōshima	5	
September 2	Uta no Prince-sama: Maji Love ST☆RISH Tours	A-1 Pictures	Chika Nagaoka	102	
September 9	The Tunnel to Summer, the Exit of Goodbyes	CLAP	Tomohisa Taguchi	83	
September 16	Drifting Home	Studio Colorido	Hiroyasu Ishida	120	
September 30 – November 25	Legend of the Galactic Heroes: The New Thesis - Intrigue	Production I.G	Shunsuke Tada	300	
October 7	To Every You I've Loved Before	Bakken Record	Jun Matsumoto	102	
October 7	To Me, the One Who Loved You	TMS Entertainment	Ken'ichi Kasai	98	
October 14	Guardy Girls	Kachidoki Studio	D-Key	78	
October 14	Wataten!: An Angel Flew Down to Me: Precious Friends	Doga Kobo	Daisuke Hiramaki	67	
October 21	Break of Dawn	Zero-G	Tomoyuki Kurokawa	120	
October 22	Sword Art Online Progressive: Scherzo of Deep Night	A-1 Pictures	Ayako Kōno	100	
October 28	A Turtle's Shell Is a Human's Ribs	Type ZERO	Masa Mori	68	
November 11	Suzume	CoMix Wave Films	Makoto Shinkai	122	
November 25	That Time I Got Reincarnated as a Slime the Movie: Scarlet Bond	Eight Bit	Yasuhito Kikuchi	108	
December 3	The First Slam Dunk	Toei Animation; Dandelion Animation Studio	Takehiko Inoue	124	
December 9	Kaiketsu Zorori: La La La Sutā Tanjō	Ajia-do Animation Works; Bandai Namco Pictures	Takahide Ogata	70	
December 17	Kaguya-sama: Love Is War – The First Kiss That Never Ends	A-1 Pictures	Mamoru Hatakeyama	90	
December 20	The Seven Deadly Sins: Grudge of Edinburgh (part 1)	Alfred Imageworks; Marvy Jack	Noriyuki Abe (Chief); Bob Shirahata		
December 23	Lonely Castle in the Mirror	A-1 Pictures	Keiichi Hara	116	

=== Television series ===
A list of anime television series that debuted between January 1 and December 31, 2022.

First run start and end dates	Title	Episodes	Studio	Director(s)	Original title	Ref
January 5 – March 23	In the Land of Leadale	12	Maho Film	Takeyuki Yanase	Leadale no Daichi nite	
January 5 – February 23	Irodorimidori	8	Akatsuki	Chihaya Tanaka		
January 5 – March 30	Police in a Pod	13	Madhouse	Yuzo Sato	Hakozume: Kōban Joshi no Gyakushū	
January 6 – March 24	Orient (part 1)	12	A.C.G.T	Tetsuya Yanagisawa		
January 6 – March 31	Saiyuki Reload: Zeroin	13	Liden Films	Misato Takada		
January 6 – April 7	Tokyo 24th Ward	12	CloverWorks	Naokatsu Tsuda	Tokyo 24-ku	
January 7 – March 25	Slow Loop	12	Connect	Noriaki Akitaya		
January 8 – June 25	Cue!	24	Yumeta Company; Graphinica	Shin Katagai		
January 8 – March 26	Girls' Frontline	12	Asahi Production	Shigeru Ueda		
January 8 – March 18, 2023	Ninjala	60	OLM	Mamoru Kanbe		
January 8 – March 26	Teasing Master Takagi-san (season 3)	12	Shin-Ei Animation	Hiroaki Akagi	Karakai Jōzu no Takagi-san	
January 8 – March 26	The Strongest Sage With the Weakest Crest	12	J.C.Staff	Noriaki Akitaya	Shikkakumon no Saikyō Kenja	
January 9 – March 27	Akebi's Sailor Uniform	12	CloverWorks	Miyuki Kuroki	Akebi-chan no Sērāfuku	
January 9 – March 27	Futsal Boys!!!!!	12	Diomedéa	Yukina Hiiro	Futtosaru Bōizu!!!!!	
January 9 – April 3	How a Realist Hero Rebuilt the Kingdom (part 2)	13	J.C.Staff	Takashi Watanabe	Genjitsu Shugi Yūsha no Ōkoku Saikenki	
January 9 – April 3	Miss Kuroitsu from the Monster Development Department	12	Quad	Hisashi Saitō	Kaijin Kaihatsubu no Kuroitsu-san	
January 9 – March 27	My Dress-Up Darling	12	CloverWorks	Keisuke Shinohara	Sono Bisque Doll wa Koi wo Suru	
January 9 – June 26	Requiem of the Rose King	24	J.C.Staff	Kentarō Suzuki	Bara-Ō no Sōretsu	
January 9 – March 27	Rusted Armors: Daybreak	12	Kigumi	Shinmei Kawahara	Sabiiro no Āma: Reimei	
January 10 – April 4	Attack on Titan: The Final Season (part 2)	12	MAPPA	Jun Shishido (Chief); Yuichiro Hayashi	Shingeki no Kyojin: The Final Season	
January 10 – March 18	GaruGaku II: Lucky Stars	50	OLM	Makoto Nakata	Garu-gaku. II 〜 rakkī Stars 〜	
January 10 – March 28	On Air Dekinai!	12	Jinnan Studio; Space Neko Company	Jun Aoki	On'ea Dekinai!	
January 10 – March 28	Sasaki and Miyano	12	Studio Deen	Shinji Ishihira	Sasaki to Miyano	
January 10 – March 28	Tribe Nine	12	Liden Films	Yū Aoki	Toraibu nain	
January 11 – March 29	Fantasia Sango - Realm of Legends	12	Geek Toys	Shunsuke Machitani	Gensou Sangokushi: Tengen Reishinki	
January 11 – March 29	Princess Connect! Re:Dive (season 2)	12	CygamesPictures	Takaomi Kansaki (Chief); Yasuo Iwamoto		
January 11 – March 29	Sabikui Bisco	12	OZ	Atsushi Ikariya	Sabi-gui bisuko	
January 11 – March 29	The Genius Prince's Guide to Raising a Nation Out of Debt	12	Yokohama Animation Laboratory	Masato Tamagawa	Tensai Ōji no Akaji Kokka Saisei Jutsu ~Sō da, Baikoku Shiyō~	
January 12 – March 30	Life with an Ordinary Guy Who Reincarnated into a Total Fantasy Knockout	12	OLM Team Yoshioka	Sayaka Yamai	Fantasy Bishōjo Juniku Ojisan to	
January 12 – March 30	She Professed Herself Pupil of the Wise Man	12	Studio A-Cat	Keitaro Motonaga	Kenja no Deshi o Nanoru Kenja	
January 13 – March 31	Arifureta: From Commonplace to World's Strongest (season 2)	12	Asread; Studio Mother	Akira Iwanaga	Arifureta Shokugyō de Sekai Saikyō	
January 13 – March 31	Love of Kill	12	Platinum Vision	Hideaki Ōba	Koroshi Ai	
January 14 – August 12	I'm Kodama Kawashiri	24	Lapin Track	Shingo Kaneko	Atasha Kawashiri Kodama da yo～Denjarasu Raifu Hakkā no Tadareta Seikatsu～	
January 15 – April 2	The Case Study of Vanitas (part 2)	12	Bones	Tomoyuki Itamura	Vanitasu no Karute	
January 30 – April 17	Salaryman's Club	12	Liden Films	Aimi Yamauchi	Rīmanzu Kurabu	
February 6 – January 29, 2023	Delicious Party Pretty Cure	45	Toei Animation	Toshinori Fukazawa	Derishasu Pāti♡Purikyua	
February 6 – May 1	Shenmue: The Animation	13	Telecom Animation Film	Chikara Sakurai		
April 2 – June 18	Aharen-san Is Indecipherable	12	Felix Film	Yasutaka Yamamoto (Chief); Tomoe Makino	Aharen-san wa Hakarenai	
April 2 – June 25	Fanfare of Adolescence	13	Lay-duce	Makoto Katō	Gunjō no Fanfare	
April 2 – September 24	Love All Play	24	Nippon Animation; OLM	Hiroshi Takeuchi	Rabu Ōru Purē	
April 2 – June 25	Love Live! Nijigasaki High School Idol Club (season 2)	13	Bandai Namco Filmworks	Tomoyuki Kawamura	Love Live! Nijigasaki Gakuen Sukūru Aidoru Dōkō-kai	
April 2 – June 18	Mahjong Soul Pong	12	Scooter Films	Kenshirō Morii	Jantama Pong	
April 2 – June 18	Science Fell in Love, So I Tried to Prove It r=1-sinθ	12	Zero-G	Tōru Kitahata	Rikei ga Koi ni Ochita no de Shōmei Shite Mita. r=1-sinθ	
April 2 –	Shadowverse Flame		Zexcs	Keiichiro Kawaguchi		
April 2 – June 18	The Executioner and Her Way of Life	12	J.C.Staff	Yoshiki Kawasaki	Shokei Shōjo no Virgin Road	
April 3 – June 19	Black Rock Shooter: Dawn Fall	12	Bibury Animation Studios; Bibury Animation CG	Tensho		
April 3 – June 26	Build Divide -#FFFFFF (Code White)-	12	Liden Films	Yuki Komada		
April 3	Magia Record: Puella Magi Madoka Magica Side Story - Dawn of a Shallow Dream	4	Shaft	Gekidan Inu Curry (Doroinu) (Chief); Yukihiro Miyamoto	Magia Record: Mahō Shōjo Madoka Magika Gaiden - Asaki Yume no Akatsuki	
April 3 – June 19	Trapped in a Dating Sim: The World of Otome Games Is Tough for Mobs	12	ENGI	Kazuya Miura; Shin'ichi Fukumoto	Otome Game Sekai wa Mob ni Kibishii Sekai desu	
April 4 –	Chiikawa	382	Doga Kobo	Takenori Mihara		
April 4 – June 20	Healer Girl	12	3Hz	Yasuhiro Irie	Hīrā Gāru	
April 4 – August 29	Insect Land	22	TMS Entertainment	Jun Kawagoe	Insekutorando	
April 5 – May 10	Detective Conan: Zero's Tea Time	6	TMS Entertainment	Tomochi Kosaka	Meitantei Conan: Zero no Tea Time	
April 5 – June 21	I'm Quitting Heroing	12	EMT Squared	Yuu Nobuta (Chief); Hisashi Ishii	Yūsha, Yamemasu: Tsugi no Shokuba wa Maōjō	
April 5 – June 21	Ya Boy Kongming!	12	P.A. Works	Shū Honma	Paripi Kōmei	
April 6 – June 29	Birdie Wing: Golf Girls' Story	13	Bandai Namco Pictures	Takayuki Inagaki		
April 6 – June 22	Deaimon	12	Encourage Films	Fumitoshi Oizaki		
April 6 – June 22	RPG Real Estate	12	Doga Kobo	Tomoaki Koshida	RPG Fudōsan	
April 6 – June 22	The Greatest Demon Lord Is Reborn as a Typical Nobody	12	Silver Link; Blade	Mirai Minato	Shijō Saikyō no Daimaō, Murabito A ni Tensei Suru	
April 6 – June 29	The Rising of the Shield Hero (season 2)	13	Kinema Citrus; DR Movie	Masato Jinbo	Tate no Yūsha no Nariagari	
April 6 – June 22	Tomodachi Game	12	Okuruto Noboru	Hirofumi Ogura	Tomodachi Gēmu	
April 7 – June 23	Estab-Life: Great Escape	12	Polygon Pictures	Hiroyuki Hashimoto		
April 7 – June 23	Heroines Run the Show	12	Lay-duce	Noriko Hashimoto	Heroine Tarumono! Kiraware Heroine to Naisho no Oshigoto	
April 7 – June 23	Komi Can't Communicate (season 2)	12	OLM	Ayumu Watanabe (Chief); Kazuki Kawagoe	Komi-san wa, Komyushō desu	
April 7 – June 23	Miss Shachiku and the Little Baby Ghost	12	Project No.9	Kū Nabara	Shachiku-san wa Yōjo Yūrei ni Iyasaretai.	
April 7 – June 23	Skeleton Knight in Another World	12	Studio Kai; Hornets	Katsumi Ono	Gaikotsu Kishi-sama, Tadaima Isekai e Odekake-chū	
April 8 – June 24	Date A Live IV	12	Geek Toys	Jun Nakagawa		
April 8 – June 24	Love After World Domination	12	Project No.9	Kazuya Iwata	Koi wa Sekai Seifuku no Ato de	
April 8 – July 1	The Dawn of the Witch	12	Tezuka Productions	Satoshi Kuwabara	Mahōtsukai Reimeiki	
April 8 – July 1	The Demon Girl Next Door (season 2)	12	J.C.Staff	Hiroaki Sakurai	Machikado Mazoku 2-Chōme	
April 9 – September 24	Aoashi	24	Production I.G	Akira Sato		
April 9 – June 18	Dance Dance Danseur	11	MAPPA	Munehisa Sakai	Dansu Dansu Dansūru	
April 9 – June 25	Kaguya-sama: Love Is War – Ultra Romantic	13	A-1 Pictures	Mamoru Hatakeyama	Kaguya-sama wa Kokurasetai: Ultra Romantic	
April 9 – June 25	Spy × Family (part 1)	12	Wit Studio; CloverWorks	Kazuhiro Furuhashi		
April 9 – June 11	Yatogame-chan Kansatsu Nikki (season 4)	10	Hayabusa Film	Hisayoshi Hirasawa		
April 10 – June 26	Don't Hurt Me, My Healer!	12	Jumondou	Nobuaki Nakanishi	Kono Healer, Mendokusai	
April 10 – July 3	In the Heart of Kunoichi Tsubaki	13	CloverWorks	Takuhiro Kadochi	Kunoichi Tsubaki no Mune no Uchi	
April 10 – October 2	Kingdom (season 4)	26	Pierrot; Studio Signpost	Kenichi Imaizumi		
April 10 – July 10	Shikimori's Not Just a Cutie	12	Doga Kobo	Ryota Itoh	Kawaii dake ja Nai Shikimori-san	
April 11 – July 1	Onipan!	12	Wit Studio	Masahiko Ohta		
April 12 – June 28	Amaim Warrior at the Borderline (part 2)	12	Sunrise Beyond	Nobuyoshi Habara	Kyōkai Senki	
April 12 – June 14	Ascendance of a Bookworm (season 3)	10	Ajia-do Animation Works	Mitsuru Hongo	Honzuki no Gekokujō: Shisho ni Naru Tame niwa Shudan o Erandeiraremasen	
April 13 – June 29	Kaginado (season 2)	12	Liden Films Kyoto Studio	Kazuya Sakamoto		
April 15 – September 30	Summer Time Rendering	25	OLM	Ayumu Watanabe	Samā Taimu Renda	
April 24 – October 2	A Couple of Cuckoos	24	Shin-Ei Animation; SynergySP	Hiroaki Akagi (Chief); Yoshiyuki Shirahata	Kakkō no Iinazuke	
May 17 – May 31	Shin Ikki Tousen	3	Arms	Rion Kujo		
July 2 – September 17	Iii Icecrin 2	12	Shin-Ei Animation; TIA	Juria Matsumura	Iii Aisu Kurin 2	
July 2 – September 25	Lycoris Recoil	13	A-1 Pictures	Shingo Adachi	Rikorisu Rikoiru	
July 2 – September 17	Musasino!	12	A-Real	Mitsuyuki Ishibashi		
July 2 – September 3	Phantom of the Idol	10	Studio Gokumi	Daisei Fukuoka	Kami Kuzu Idol	
July 2 – September 17	Rent-A-Girlfriend (season 2)	12	TMS Entertainment	Kazuomi Koga	Kanojo, Okarishimasu	
July 2 – September 24	Shoot! Goal to the Future	13	EMT Squared; Magic Bus	Noriyuki Nakamura	Shūto! Goal to the Future	
July 2 – September 24	Teppen!!!!!!!!!!!!!!! Laughing 'til You Cry	12	Drive	Shinji Takamatsu (Chief); Toshinori Watanabe	Teppen—!!!!!!!!!!!!!!!	
July 3 – September 25	Engage Kiss	13	A-1 Pictures	Tomoya Tanaka		
July 3 – September 25	Luminous Witches	12	Shaft	Shouji Saeki	Renmei Kūgun Kōkū Mahō Ongakutai Luminous Witches	
July 3 – September 18	RWBY: Ice Queendom	12	Shaft	Kenjirou Okada (Chief); Toshimasa Suzuki	RWBY: Hyōsetsu Teikoku	
July 3 – December 25	Utawarerumono: Mask of Truth	28	White Fox	Kenichi Kawamura	Utawarerumono: Futari no Hakuoro	
July 3 – September 18	Yurei Deco	12	Science SARU	Tomohisa Shimoyama	Yūrei Deko	
July 4 – September 26	Classroom of the Elite (season 2)	13	Lerche	Seiji Kishi (Chief); Hiroyuki Hashimoto (Chief); Yoshihito Nishōji	Yōkoso Jitsuryoku Shijō Shugi no Kyōshitsu e	
July 4 – September 12	My Isekai Life	12	Revoroot	Keisuke Kojima	Tensei Kenja no Isekai Life: Daini no Shokugyō o Ete, Sekai Saikyō ni Narimashita	
July 5 – September 27	Overlord (season 4)	13	Madhouse	Naoyuki Itō		
July 5 – September 20	Vermeil in Gold	12	Staple Entertainment	Takashi Naoya	Kinsō no Vermeil: Gakeppuchi Majutsushi wa Saikyō no Yakusai to Mahō Sekai o Tsukisusumu	
July 6 – September 21	Dropkick on My Devil! X	12	Nomad	Hikaru Sato (Chief); Taku Yamada	Jashin-chan Dropkick X	
July 6 – September 21	Harem in the Labyrinth of Another World	12	Passione	Naoyuki Tatsuwa	Isekai Meikyū de Harem o	
July 6 – September 28	Made in Abyss: The Golden City of the Scorching Sun	12	Kinema Citrus	Masayuki Kojima	Made in Abyss: Retsujitsu no Ōgonkyō	
July 6 – September 21	My Stepmom's Daughter Is My Ex	12	Project No.9	Shinsuke Yanagi	Mamahaha no Tsurego ga Motokano datta	
July 6 – September 21	Smile of the Arsnotoria the Animation	12	Liden Films	Naoyuki Tatsuwa	Warau Arsnotoria Sun—!	
July 6 – September 21	Tokyo Mew Mew New	12	Yumeta Company; Graphinica	Takahiro Natori	Tōkyō myūmyū ni ~yu ~♡	
July 6 – March 8, 2023	Uncle from Another World	13	Atelier Pontdarc	Shigeki Kawai	Isekai Ojisan	
July 7 – September 30	Chimimo	12	Shin-Ei Animation	Pino Aruto		
July 7 – September 29	The Prince of Tennis II: U-17 World Cup	13	M.S.C. Studio Kai	Keiichiro Kawaguchi	Shin tenisunoōjisama U - 17 WORLD kappu	
July 7 – September 22	The Yakuza's Guide to Babysitting	12	Feel; Gaina	Itsuro Kawasaki	Kumichō Musume to Sewagakari	
July 8 – September 30	Call of the Night	13	Liden Films	Tetsuya Miyanishi (Chief); Tomoyuki Itamura	Yofukashi no Uta	
July 8 – September 23	Shine On! Bakumatsu Bad Boys!	12	Geno Studio	Tetsuo Hirakawa	Bucchigire!	
July 8 – September 23	When Will Ayumu Make His Move?	12	Silver Link	Mirai Minato	Soredemo Ayumu wa Yosetekuru	
July 9 – September 24	Black Summoner	12	Satelight	Yoshimasa Hiraike	Kuro no Shōkanshi	
July 9 – December 24	Lucifer and the Biscuit Hammer	24	NAZ	Nobuaki Nakanishi	Hoshi no Samidare	
July 9 – September 24	Prima Doll	12	Bibury Animation Studios	Tensho	Purima Dōru	
July 9 – September 24	Shadows House (season 2)	12	CloverWorks	Kazuki Ōhashi		
July 10 – September 25	Extreme Hearts	12	Seven Arcs	Junji Nishimura	Ekusutorīmu hātsu	
July 10 – September 25	Hanabi-chan Is Often Late	12	Gaina	Hiromitsu Kanazawa	Hanabi-chan wa Okuregachi	
July 10 – October 2	KJ File	13	ILCA yell	Akira Funada		
July 10 – September 25	Parallel World Pharmacy	12	Diomedéa	Keizō Kusakawa	Isekai Yakkyoku	
July 12 – September 27	Orient (part 2)	12	A.C.G.T	Tetsuya Yanagisawa		
July 13 – October 19	Shine Post	12	Studio Kai	Kei Oikawa	Shain Posuto	
July 14 – September 29	The Devil Is a Part-Timer!!	12	3Hz	Daisuke Tsukushi	Hataraku Maō-sama!!	
July 17 – October 9	Love Live! Superstar!! (season 2)	12	Bandai Namco Filmworks	Takahiko Kyogoku		
July 23 – October 1	Is It Wrong to Try to Pick Up Girls in a Dungeon? (season 4, part 1)	11	J.C.Staff	Hideki Tachibana	Dungeon ni Deai o Motomeru no wa Machigatteiru Darō ka?	
July 24 – October 9	The Maid I Hired Recently Is Mysterious	11	Silver Link; Blade	Mirai Minato (Chief); Misuzu Hoshino	Saikin Yatotta Maid ga Ayashii	
July 28 – July 29	BanG Dream! Morfonication	2	Sanzigen	Kōdai Kakimoto (Chief); Tomomi Umetsu		
August 1 – October 17	Fuuto PI	12	Studio Kai	Yousuke Kabashima		
August 4 – January 11, 2023	Nights with a Cat	30	Studio Puyukai	Minoru Ashina	Yoru wa Neko to Issho	
September 27 – March 28, 2023	Chickip Dancers (season 2)	26	Fanworks	Rareko		
September 30 – December 23	My Master Has No Tail	13	Liden Films	Hideyo Yamamoto	Uchi no Shishō wa Shippo ga Nai	
October 1 – December 17	I'm the Villainess, So I'm Taming the Final Boss	12	Maho Film	Kumiko Habara	Akuyaku Reijō Nanode Last Boss o Katte Mimashita	
October 1 – December 17	I've Somehow Gotten Stronger When I Improved My Farm-Related Skills	12	Studio A-Cat	Norihiko Nagahama	Nōmin Kanren no Skill Bakka Agetetara Nazeka Tsuyoku Natta	
October 1 – March 25, 2023	My Hero Academia (season 6)	25	Bones	Kenji Nagasaki (Chief); Masahiro Mukai	Boku no Hero Academia 6	
October 1 – December 24	Raven of the Inner Palace	13	Bandai Namco Pictures	Chizuru Miyawaki	Kōkyū no Karasu	
October 1 – December 24	Spy × Family (part 2)	13	Wit Studio; CloverWorks	Kazuhiro Furuhashi		
October 1 – December 24	Uzaki-chan Wants to Hang Out! ω	13	ENGI	Kazuya Miura	Uzaki-chan wa Asobitai! ω	
October 2 – December 25	Beast Tamer	13	EMT Squared	Atsushi Nigorikawa	Yūsha Party o Tsuihou Sareta Beast Tamer, Saikyōshu no Nekomimi Shōjo to Deau	
October 2 – December 25	Berserk: The Golden Age Arc – Memorial Edition	13	Studio 4°C	Yuta Sano	Beruseruku Ōgon Jidai-hen Memoriaru Edishon	
October 2 – December 5	Harem Camp!	8	Studio Hōkiboshi	Toshihiro Watase	Hāremu Kyanputsu!	
October 2 – October 23	Housing Complex C	4	Akatsuki	Yūji Nara	C Danchi	
October 2 – February 26, 2023	Idolish7: Third Beat! (part 2)	17	Troyca	Makoto Bessho		
October 2 – January 8, 2023	Mobile Suit Gundam: The Witch from Mercury (part 1)	12	Bandai Namco Filmworks	Hiroshi Kobayashi; Ryo Ando	Kidō Senshi Gundam: Suisei no Majo	
October 2 – December 18	Pop Team Epic (season 2)	12	Space Neko Company; Kamikaze Douga	Jun Aoki		
October 2 – March 26, 2023	PuniRunes	25	OLM Digital	Kunihiko Yuyama	Punirunzu	
October 3 – June 26, 2023	Golden Kamuy (season 4)	13	Brain's Base	Shizutaka Sugahara (Chief)		
October 3 – April 3, 2023	Mamekichi Mameko NEET no Nichijō	48	Tezuka Productions	Satoshi Kuwabara		
October 3 – December 19	Management of a Novice Alchemist	12	ENGI	Hiroshi Ikehata	Shinmai Renkinjutsushi no Tenpo Keiei	
October 4 – December 20	Detective Conan: The Culprit Hanzawa	12	TMS Entertainment	Akitaro Daichi	Meitantei Conan: Hannin no Hanzawa-san	
October 4 – December 20	Shinobi no Ittoki	12	Troyca	Shuu Watanabe		
October 5 – December 21	Encouragement of Climb: Next Summit	12	Eight Bit	Yusuke Yamamoto		
October 5 – December 21	Immoral Guild	12	TNK	Takuya Asaoka	Futoku no Guild	
October 5 – December 21	Reincarnated as a Sword	12	C2C	Shinji Ishihira	Tensei Shitara Ken Deshita	
October 5 – February 15, 2023	The Eminence in Shadow	20	Nexus	Kazuya Nakanishi	Kage no Jitsuryokusha ni Naritakute!	
October 5 – December 21	The Human Crazy University	12	DLE	Tsukasa Nishiyama	Human Bug Daigaku Fushi Gakubu Fukō Gakka	
October 5 – December 28	VazzRock the Animation	13	PRA	Yoshihiro Takamoto		
October 6 – December 22	Bibliophile Princess	12	Madhouse	Tarou Iwasaki	Mushikaburi-hime	
October 6 – December 22	Do It Yourself!!	12	Pine Jam	Kazuhiro Yoneda	Dū Itto Yuaserufu!!	
October 6 – December 22	Mob Psycho 100 III	12	Bones	Yuzuru Tachikawa (Chief); Takahiro Hasui		
October 6 – December 22	Muv-Luv Alternative (season 2)	12	Yumeta Company; Graphinica	Yukio Nishimoto		
October 6 – December 22	Sylvanian Families: Flare no Happy Diary	12	LandQ Studios		Shirubania famirī furea no happī daiarī	
October 7 – December 23	Akiba Maid War	12	P.A. Works	Sōichi Masui	Akiba Meido Sensō	
October 7 – March 17, 2023	Megaton Musashi (season 2)	15	OLM	Akihiro Hino (Chief); Shigeharu Takahashi		
October 7 – January 3, 2023	Reiwa no Di Gi Charat	16	Liden Films	Hiroaki Sakurai		
October 8 – December 24	Legend of Mana: The Teardrop Crystal	12	Yokohama Animation Laboratory; Graphinica	Masato Jinbo	Seiken Densetsu Legend of Mana: The Teardrop Crystal	
October 8 – December 24	Pui Pui Molcar Driving School	12	Shin-Ei Animation	Hana Ono		
October 8 – March 4, 2023	Welcome to Demon School! Iruma-kun (season 3)	21	Bandai Namco Pictures	Makoto Moriwaki	Mairimashita! Iruma-kun	
October 9 – March 26, 2023	Blue Lock	24	Eight Bit	Tetsuaki Watanabe	Burū Rokku	
October 9 – December 25	Bocchi the Rock!	12	CloverWorks	Keiichirō Saitō	Botchi Za Rokku!	
October 9 – December 25	More Than a Married Couple, But Not Lovers	12	Studio Mother	Takao Kato (Chief); Junichi Yamamoto	Fūfu Ijō, Koibito Miman	
October 10 – December 26	Peter Grill and the Philosopher's Time: Super Extra	12	Wolfsbane; Seven	Tatsumi	Peter Gril to Kenja no Jikan: Super Extra	
October 10 – March 27, 2023	Yowamushi Pedal: Limit Break	25	TMS/8PAN	Osamu Nabeshima	Yowamushi pedaru LIMIT BREAK	
October 11 – December 27	Bleach: Thousand-Year Blood War (part 1)	13	Pierrot	Tomohisa Taguchi	Bleach: Sennen Kessen-hen	
October 11 – March 28, 2023	Eternal Boys	24	Liden Films	migmi	Eikyū Shōnen	
October 11 – March 28, 2023	Play It Cool, Guys	24	Pierrot	Chiaki Kon	Cool Doji Danshi	
October 12 – December 28	Chainsaw Man	12	MAPPA	Ryū Nakayama	Chensō Man	
October 12 – December 28	Love Flops	12	Passione	Nobuyoshi Nagayama	Renai Flops	
October 13 – December 29	Aru Asa Dummy Head Mike ni Natteita Ore-kun no Jinsei	12	Ekachi Epilka; Indivision	Yoshinobu Kasai	Aru Asa Damī Heddo Maiku ni Natteita Ore-kun no Jinsei	
October 14 – March 24, 2023	Urusei Yatsura (part 1)	23	David Production	Takahiro Kamei; Hideya Takahashi; Yasuhiro Kimura		
October 16 – December 25	The Little Lies We All Tell	11	Studio Flad	Makoto Hoshino	4-Nin wa Sorezore Uso o Tsuku	
October 23 – March 12, 2023	To Your Eternity (season 2)	20	Drive	Kiyoko Sayama	Fumetsu no Anata e	
October 29 – December 17	Arknights: Prelude to Dawn	8	Yostar Pictures	Yuki Watanabe	Arknights: Reimei Zensō	
November 4 – March 25, 2023	Kantai Collection: Let's Meet at Sea	8	ENGI	Kazuya Miura	KanColle: Itsuka Ano Umi de	
December 5 – June 19, 2023	Me & Roboco	28	Gallop	Akitaro Daichi	Boku to Roboco	

=== Original net animations ===
A list of original net animations that debuted between January 1 and December 31, 2022.

First run start and end dates	Title	Episodes	Studio	Director(s)	Original title	Ref
January 11	Ohiru no Shocker-san	1	Kachidoki Studio	Hiroshi Namiki		
January 14	Inzai Aru Aru Monogatari	1	Asura Film	Yū Aoki		
January 21	Tales of Luminaria: The Fateful Crossroad	2	Kamikaze Douga; Anima	Shiori Kato; Midori Kato		
February 9	Shiyakusho	1	Typhoon Graphics			
March 10	Kotaro Lives Alone	10	Liden Films	Tomoe Makino	Kotarō wa Hitori Gurashi	
March 28	Thermae Romae Novae	11	NAZ	Tetsuya Tatamitani		
April 8	Tiger & Bunny 2 (part 1)	13	Bandai Namco Pictures	Mitsuko Kase		
April 14	Ultraman (season 2)	6	Production I.G; Sola Digital Arts	Kenji Kamiyama; Shinji Aramaki; Hiroki Uchiyama		
April 19	Pacific Rim: The Black (season 2)	7	Polygon Pictures	Hiroyuki Hayashi; Jae-hong Kim	Pacific Rim: Ankoku no Tairiku	
May 14	Jewelpet Attack Travel!	1	Ashi Productions	Hiroshi Negishi	Juerupetto Atakku Toraberu!	
May 16	Vampire in the Garden	5	Wit Studio	Ryōtarō Makihara	Vanpaia in za Gāden	
May 18 – June 22	Pokémon: Hisuian Snow	3	Wit Studio	Ken Yamamoto	Yuki Hodo Kishi Futaai	
May 23	Ghost in the Shell: SAC_2045 (season 2)	12	Production I.G; Sola Digital Arts	Kenji Kamiyama; Shinji Aramaki		
June 18	Spriggan	6	David Production	Hiroshi Kobayashi	Supurigan	
June 30	Bastard!! -Heavy Metal, Dark Fantasy- (part 1)	13	Liden Films	Takaharu Ozaki	Bastard!! Ankoku no Hakaishin	
July 23 – July 31	Kawaii Tanuki mo Raku ja nai	5	Magia			
July 30 – October 8	A Herbivorous Dragon of 5,000 Years Gets Unfairly Villainized	12	Studio LAN	Liu Siwen	Yowai 5000-nen no Sōshoku Dragon, Iwarenaki Jaryū Nintei	
July 31 – October 9	Knights of the Zodiac: Saint Seiya – Battle for Sanctuary	12	Toei Animation	Yoshiharu Ashino	Seitōshi seiya: Knights of the zodiakku batoru sankuchuari	
August 2 – February 5, 2023	Doomsday With My Dog	72	DLE	Sorosoro Tanigawa	Sekai no Owari ni Shiba Inu to	
August 4	Kakegurui Twin	6	MAPPA	Yuichiro Hayashi (Chief); Kaori Makita	Kakegurui Tsuin	
August 18	Tekken: Bloodline	6	Studio Hibari; Larx Entertainment	Yoshikazu Miyao		
September 13	Cyberpunk: Edgerunners	10	Studio Trigger	Hiroyuki Imaishi	Saibāpanku Edjirannāzu	
September 14 – October 12	Tatami Time Machine Blues	6	Science SARU	Shingo Natsume	Yojōhan Time Machine Blues	
September 15	Bastard!! -Heavy Metal, Dark Fantasy- (part 2)	11	Liden Films	Takaharu Ozaki	Bastard!! Ankoku no Hakaishin	
October 7	Tiger & Bunny 2 (part 2)	12	Bandai Namco Pictures	Mitsuko Kase		
October 13	Exception	8	Tatsunoko Production; 5 Inc.	Yūzō Satō		
October 16 – March 26, 2023	Umayuru	24	Scooter Films	Seiya Miyajima		
October 27	Romantic Killer	12	DOMERICA	Kazuya Ichikawa	Romantikku Kirā	
December 8	Lookism	8	Studio Mir	Kwang Il Han		
December 13	Gudetama: An Eggcelent Adventure	10	OLM	Motonori Sakakibara	Gudetama: Haha wo Tazunete Donkurai	
December 16	Lupin Zero	6	Telecom Animation Film	Daisuke Sakō		

=== Original video animations ===
A list of original video animations that debuted between January 1 and December 31, 2022.

First run start and end dates	Title	Episodes	Studio	Director(s)	Original title	Ref
January 28	Otome wa Boku ni Koishiteru: Trinkle Stars	1	Blue Bread	Fumio Ito		
February 4	Hairpin Double	1	Felix Film; GA-CREW	Tomohito Naka		
March 10	The Girl from the Other Side: Siúil, a Rún	1	Wit Studio	Yūtarō Kubo; Satomi Maiya	Totsukuni no Shoujo	
March 16	Mushoku Tensei: Jobless Reincarnation	1	Studio Bind	Manabu Okamoto		
March 23	Non Non Biyori Nonstop	1	Silver Link	Shinya Kawatsura		
March 30 – July 29	Strike the Blood Final	4	Connect	Hideyo Yamamoto		
April 27	Moriarty the Patriot	2	Production I.G	Kazuya Nomura	Yūkoku no Moriāti	
June 17	Kaitō Queen wa Circus ga Osuki	1	East Fish Studio	Saori Den		
June 24 – August 24	I'm Quitting Heroing	2	EMT Squared	Yuu Nobuta (Chief); Hisashi Ishii	Yūsha, Yamemasu: Tsugi no Shokuba wa Maōjō	
July 27	Sasaki and Miyano	1	Studio Deen	Shinji Ishihara	Sasaki to Miyano	
September 25	Arifureta: From Commonplace to World's Strongest	1	Asread; Studio Mother	Akira Iwanaga	Arifureta Shokugyō de Sekai Saikyō	
October 26	Hyperdimension Neptunia: Nep Nep Darake no Festival	1	Okuruto Noboru	Masahiro Mukai		
November 22	Fly Me to the Moon ~Uniform~	1	Seven Arcs	Hiroshi Ikehata	Tonikaku Kawaii ~Seifuku~	
November 25 – December 23	Harem in the Labyrinth of Another World	2	Passione	Naoyuki Tatsuwa	Isekai Meikyū de Harem o	
December 8	Onna no Sono no Hoshi	1	Lapin Track	Mamoru Hatakeyama		

== Deaths ==
=== January ===
- January 10: Shinji Mizushima, Japanese manga artist (Dokaben), dies from pneumonia at age 82.

=== February ===
- February 6: Saki Nitta, Japanese voice actress (voice of Bridget Faye and Cache Dop in D.Gray-man Hallow, Pakuri in Kill la Kill), dies from meningioma at age 31.
- February 8: Toshiya Ueda, Japanese voice actor (voice of Nefertari Cobra in One Piece, Futon in Rascal the Raccoon, Titicaca in The Adventures of Pepero, Vilk in The Promised Neverland), dies at age 88.
- February 12: Manabu Ôhashi, Japanese animator (Toei Animation, TMS Entertainment, Madhouse, A Tree of Palme, Black Jack, Bodacious Space Pirates: Abyss of Hyperspace, Children Who Chase Lost Voices, Harmony, Jungle Emperor Leo, Junkers Come Here, Legend of Crystania, Patema Inverted, Robot Carnival, Roujin Z, Tomorrow's Joe, Venus Wars), art director, writer and director (Robot Carnival), dies at age 73.
- February 28:
  - Kirk Baily, American actor (voice of Millions Knives in Trigun, Shin in Cowboy Bebop, Tetsuya in Fushigi Yugi, Garma Zabi in Mobile Suit Gundam: The Movie Trilogy), dies from lung cancer at age 59.
  - Norihiro Inoue, Japanese voice actor (voice of Schneizel el Britannia in Code Geass, Marco in Gunslinger Girl, Taichi Hiraga Keaton in Master Keaton, Atlas in Metropolis), dies from esophageal cancer at 63.

=== March ===
- March 5: Taro Shigaki, Japanese actor (voice of Saki Vashtar in Area 88, Franz in Nutcracker Fantasy, Siegfried in Swan Lake, Soldier Blue in Toward the Terra, Andre in The Rose of Versailles, the Prince in Hans Christian Andersen's The Little Mermaid), dies from heart failure at age 70.
- March 7: Mia Ikumi, Japanese manga artist (Tokyo Mew Mew), dies from a subarachnoid hemorrhage at age 42.

=== April ===
- April 7: Fujiko A. Fujio, Japanese manga artist (Doraemon, Ninja Hattori-kun, Obake no Q-Tarō, The Laughing Salesman, The Monster Kid), dies at age 88.
- April 8: Minori Matsushima, Japanese voice actress (voice of Candice White Adley in Candy Candy, Dororo in Dororo, Alexandria Meat in Kinnikuman, Sayaka Yumi in Mazinger Z, Tsuru in One Piece, Hiroshi Ichikawa in The Monster Kid), dies from pancreatic cancer at age 81.

=== June ===
- June 4: Jim White, American voice actor (voice of Zeke's Grandpa in Attack on Titan, Marco in Fairy Gone, the Narrator and Igneel in Fairy Tail, Haredas in One Piece), dies from lung cancer at age 73.
- June 8: Kousuke Takeuchi, Japanese voice actor (voice of Mitsuo Mishima in Between the Sky and Sea, Dragon Ryu in Duel Masters Victory, Shuun Kakei and Harao Kiminari in Eyeshield 21, Tesshin in Ginga Densetsu Weed, Hikaru Amane in The Prince of Tennis), dies at age 45.
- June 9: Billy Kametz, American voice actor (voice of Anai in Aggretsuko, White Blood Cell in Cells at Work!, Josuke Higashikata in JoJo's Bizarre Adventure, Shigeru Aoba in Neon Genesis Evangelion, Ren and Ash's Rotom Phone in Pokémon Journeys: The Series, Galo Thymos in Promare, Mikhail in Sirius the Jaeger, Naofumi Iwatani in The Rising of the Shield Hero), dies from colon cancer at age 35.
- June 11: Kumiko Takizawa, Japanese voice actress (voice of Kate Hathaway and Lucina Pressette in Ginga Hyōryū Vifam, Madoka Nagasaki in Miss Machiko, Panther Zora in New Cutie Honey, Naoko in Nabari no Ou, Grandis in Nadia: The Secret of Blue Water, Shaya Thoov in The Super Dimension Century Orguss), dies from a heart attack at age 69.
- June 23: Chumei Watanabe, Japanese composer (Getter Robo Go, Godannar, Mazinger Z, Transformers: Victory), dies from heart failure at age 96.
- June 27: Yuki Katsuragi, Japanese singer (performed an insert song in Space Dandy and the theme songs for Goku Midnight Eye and Gon, the Little Fox), dies from peritoneal cancer at age 73.

=== July ===
- July 4: Kazuki Takahashi, Japanese manga artist and game creator (creator of Yu-Gi-Oh!), drowns at age 60.
- July 6: James Caan, American actor (voice of the Bamboo Cutter in The Tale of the Princess Kaguya), dies at age 82.
- July 23: DUBU, Korean manhwa artist (Solo Leveling), dies from a cerebral hemorrhage caused by chronic illness.
- July 30:
  - Pat Carroll, American actress (voice of Granny in the Disney dub of My Neighbor Totoro), dies at age 95.
  - Kiyoshi Kobayashi, Japanese voice actor (voice of Watari in Death Note, Bem in Humanoid Monster Bem, Mohammed Avdol in JoJo's Bizarre Adventure (OVA), Adrian Rubinsky in Legend of the Galactic Heroes (OVA), Daisuke Jigen in the Lupin the Third franchise), dies from pneumonia at age 89.

=== August ===
- August 1: Hiroshi Ōtake, Japanese voice actor (voice of 004 in Cyborg 009, King Nikochan in Dr. Slump, Boss in Mazinger Z, Koike in Obake no Q-Tarō, Parman No. 2 in Perman, Sanpei in Speed Racer), dies from acute heart failure at age 90.
- August 7: Yoshifumi Ushima, Japanese singer-songwriter (performed an insert song in H2 and the theme songs of H2 and Mobile Fighter G Gundam), dies from chronic liver cirrhosis at age 55.
- August 17: Motomu Kiyokawa, Japanese voice actor (voice of Walter C. Dornez in Hellsing, Tippy in Is the Order a Rabbit?, Tem Ray in Mobile Suit Gundam, Kozo Fuyutsuki in Neon Genesis Evangelion and Rebuild of Evangelion, Artorius in Restaurant to Another World), dies from pneumonia at age 87.
- August 25: Shichirō Kobayashi, Japanese animation art director (Ganso Tensai Bakabon, Nodame Cantabile, The Castle of Cagliostro, Tomorrow's Joe 2, Urusei Yatsura: Beautiful Dreamer), dies from congestive heart failure at age 89.

=== September ===
- September 5: Sizzle Ohtaka, Japanese singer (performed theme songs for Hotarubi no Mori e and I'm Gonna Be An Angel!, and an insert song in .hack//Legend of the Twilight), dies from an illness at age 69.
- September 12: Ryūji Mizuno, Japanese voice actor (voice of Julius in Berserk, B'T Radio in B't X, Giichi in Naruto, Meme Midgard in Turn A Gundam, Master in Zombie Land Saga Revenge), dies from sepsis at age 70.

=== October ===
- October 5: Shinsuke Chikaishi, Japanese voice actor (voice of Yoshihiko Hasegawa in Roujin Z, Masuo Fuguta in Sazae-san, Pukko in The Amazing 3) and narrator (Gokū no Daibōken), dies from dementia at age 91.
- October 11: Angela Lansbury, Irish-English actress and singer (voice of Mommy Fortuna in The Last Unicorn), dies at age 96.
- October 23: Michael Kopsa, Canadian voice actor (voice of Col. Volcott O. Huey in Galaxy Angel, Ovan in .hack//Roots, Char Aznable in Mobile Suit Gundam, Aeolia Schenberg in Mobile Suit Gundam 00, Shoka Hong in The Story of Saiunkoku), dies from complications from a brain tumor at age 66.

=== November ===
- November 8: William Frederick Knight, American voice actor (voice of Dr. Schtalubaugh in El-Hazard, Kuzemi in Eureka Seven, Daisuke Aramaki in the Ghost in the Shell franchise, Kenzou in JoJo's Bizarre Adventure: Stone Ocean, Danzo in Naruto: Shippuden, Gordon Rosewater in The Big O), dies at age 88.
- November 11: Kevin Conroy, American actor and voice actor (voice of Batman in Batman: Gotham Knight), dies from cancer at age 66.
- November 12: Kazuki Ōmori, Japanese film director (The Boy Who Saw the Wind), dies from acute myeloid leukemia at age 70.
- November 14: Kiyoyuki Yanada, Japanese voice actor (voice of Takeshi Ooi in Death Note, Andromon in Digimon Adventure, Shu Aozaki in Durarara!!×2, Shuten Doji in Ronin Warriors, Takenori Akagi in Slam Dunk, Megatron in Transformers: Armada), dies at age 57 while undergoing cancer treatment.
- November 20: Toru Watanabe, Japanese actor (voice of Aesop in Aesop World, a teacher in Children of the Sea), dies from either bacterial gastroenteritis or sepsis at age 61.
- November 23: Grant James, American voice actor (voice of Number Zero in 009-1, Scar's Master in Fullmetal Alchemist: Brotherhood, Tokio in Hal, Mujika in Mushishi, Sirius in Nabari no Ou, Zeff in One Piece), dies at age 87.

=== December ===
- December 6: Ichirou Mizuki, Japanese singer and co-founder of JAM Project (performed theme songs for Beast King GoLion, Chōdenji Robo Combattler V, Godannar, the Mazinger franchise, Space Pirate Captain Harlock, Voltes V), dies from lung cancer at age 74.
- December 12: Gosaku Ota, Japanese manga creator (Grendizer, Groizer X, Mazinger Z), dies from pneumonia at age 74.
- December 25: Yuji Nunokawa, Japanese animator, animation director (Casshan, Creamy Mami, the Magic Angel, Osomatsu-kun, Magical Fairy Persia, Saber Rider and the Star Sheriffs, The Funny Judo Champion, Time Bokan) and founder of Studio Pierrot (Bleach, Naruto, Yu Yu Hakusho), dies at age 75.
