= DLE =

DLE or Dle may refer to:

- An ISO 269 envelope size
- DLE (company), a Japanese animation studio
- The IATA code for Dole–Jura Airport, France

== Abbreviations ==
- Discoid lupus erythematosus, a chronic skin condition
- Data Link Escape, one of the C0 and C1 control codes
- Dry Low Emission, an emission reduction technology used in gas turbines
- Diccionario de la lengua española (Dictionary of the Spanish language)
- Direct Lithium Extraction, a non-evaporitic process for extracting Lithium from brines

== Education ==
- District Level Examination, basic level final examination in Nepal

== See also ==
- "Dle Yaman", a traditional Armenian song rearranged by Komitas
