= Shōshimin Series =

Japanese mystery novel series by Honobu Yonezawa

- First novel volume cover

〈小市民〉シリーズ ((Shōshimin) Shirīzu)
- Genre: Mystery
- Novel series
- Written by: Honobu Yonezawa
- Published by: Tokyo Sogensha
- Imprint: Sogen Mystery Bunko
- Original run: December 24, 2004 – present
- Volumes: 7
- Manga

Shunki Gentei Ichigo Tart Jiken
- Written by: Honobu Yonezawa
- Illustrated by: Anko Manjūya
- Published by: Square Enix
- Magazine: Monthly GFantasy
- Original run: April 18, 2007 – December 18, 2008
- Volumes: 2
- Manga

Kaki Gentei Tropical Parfait Jiken
- Written by: Honobu Yonezawa; Fua Yamasaki (composition)
- Illustrated by: OmiOmi
- Published by: Square Enix
- Magazine: Monthly GFantasy
- Original run: February 18, 2010 – January 18, 2011
- Volumes: 2
- Anime television series

Shoshimin: How to Become Ordinary
- Directed by: Mamoru Kanbe
- Produced by: Kazuki Endou; Ryou Hino; Cao Cong; Yoshifumi Kanbara; Yoshiaki Hayashi; Akihiro Sotokawa; Yuuko Matsui; Fumihiro Ozawa; Kei Mizutani
- Written by: Toshiya Ono
- Music by: Takahiro Obata
- Studio: Lapin Track
- Licensed by: Crunchyroll; SA/SEA: Medialink
- Original network: ANN (TV Asahi), BS Asahi
- Original run: July 7, 2024 – June 22, 2025
- Episodes: 22
- Manga

(Shōshimin) Shunki Gentei Ichigo Tart Jiken
- Written by: Honobu Yonezawa
- Illustrated by: Anri Sagawa
- Published by: Kodansha
- Magazine: Magazine Pocket
- Original run: May 2, 2025 – January 2, 2026
- Volumes: 3

Shōshimin Series (Japanese: 〈小市民〉シリーズ, Hepburn: (Shōshimin) Shirīzu; lit. '⟨Small Citizen⟩ Series') is a Japanese mystery novel series written by Honobu Yonezawa. The series began publication by Tokyo Sogensha in December 2004, with seven volumes being released as of April 2026. The main story concluded in five volumes, alongside two short story collections published as side stories.

A manga adaptation of the first novel was serialized in Square Enix's shōnen manga magazine Monthly GFantasy from April 2007 to December 2008. A manga adaptation of the second novel was serialized in Monthly GFantasy from February 2010 to January 2011. A second manga adaptation of the first novel was serialized on Kodansha's manga website Magazine Pocket from 2025 to 2026.

An anime television series adaptation of the first and second novel, produced by Lapin Track, aired from July to September 2024. A second season, adapting the third and fifth novels, aired from April to June 2025.

== Plot ==
Jōgorō Kobato and Yuki Osanai are two friends who go to Funato High School. Before entering high school, the two vowed to live ordinary lives. However, this proves difficult as mysterious incidents and encounters take place at school and their town. Despite their initial pledge, the two find themselves becoming involved, with Jōgorō's interest in detective work leading him to investigate these events.

== Characters ==
Jōgorō Kobato (小鳩 常悟朗, Kobato Jōgorō)
Voiced by: Shūichirō Umeda
A male high school student at Funato High School. He wanted to be a detective since he was young, but his penchant for putting himself into other's matters led to others becoming more distant from him. In the anime, his family runs a sweets shop.
Yuki Osanai (小佐内 ゆき, Osanai Yuki)
Voiced by: Hina Yōmiya
A female high school student at Funato High School, who has been Jōgorō's friend since they were in junior high school. She likes sweets.
Kengo Dōjima (堂島 健吾, Dōjima Kengo)
Voiced by: Makoto Furukawa
Takahiko Urino (瓜野 高彦, Urino Takahiko)
Voiced by: Teppei Uenishi
Tokiko Nakamaru (仲丸 十希子, Nakamaru Tokiko)
Voiced by: Yume Miyamoto
Yūto Hiya (氷谷 優人, Hiya Yūto)
Voiced by: Seiichiro Yamashita

== Series ==
No.	Title	Release date	ISBN
1	Shunki Gentei Ichigo Tart Jiken (春期限定いちごタルト事件)	December 24, 2004	978-4-488-45101-1
2	Kaki Gentei Tropical Parfait Jiken (夏期限定トロピカルパフェ事件)	April 14, 2006	978-4-488-45102-8
3	Shūki Gentei Kuri Kinton Jiken (Jō) (秋期限定栗きんとん事件〈上〉)	February 27, 2009	978-4-488-45105-9
4	Shūki Gentei Kuri Kinton Jiken (Ge) (秋期限定栗きんとん事件〈下〉)	March 13, 2009	978-4-488-45106-6
5	Pari Makaron no Nazo (Note: Side stories) (巴里マカロンの謎)	January 31, 2020	978-4-488-45111-0
6	Tōki Gentei Bonbon Chocolat Jiken (冬期限定ボンボンショコラ事件)	April 26, 2024	978-4-488-45112-7
7	Rondon Sukōn no Nazo (倫敦スコーンの謎)	April 30, 2026	978-4-488-45113-4

== Adaptations ==
=== Manga ===
A manga adaptation of the first novel Shunki Gentei Ichigo Tart Jiken, illustrated by Anko Manjūya, was serialized in Square Enix's shōnen manga magazine Monthly GFantasy from April 18, 2007, to December 18, 2008, and was collected in two tankōbon volumes.

A manga adaptation of the second novel Kaki Gentei Tropical Parfait Jiken, illustrated by OmiOmi with composition by Fua Yamasaki, was serialized in the same magazine from February 18, 2010, to January 18, 2011, and was also collected in two tankōbon volumes.

A second manga adaptation of the first novel, titled (Shōshimin) Shunki Gentei Ichigo Tart Jiken (〈小市民〉 春期限定いちごタルト事件), illustrated by Anri Sagawa, was serialized on Kodansha's manga website Magazine Pocket from May 2, 2025, to January 2, 2026, and was collected in three tankōbon volumes.

==== Shunki Gentei Ichigo Tart Jiken ====
No.	Release date	ISBN
1	February 27, 2008	978-4-7575-2230-5
2	February 27, 2009	978-4-7575-2487-3

==== Kaki Gentei Tropical Parfait Jiken ====
No.	Release date	ISBN
1	August 27, 2010	978-4-7575-2983-0
2	February 26, 2011	978-4-7575-3152-9

==== (Shōshimin) Shunki Gentei Ichigo Tart Jiken ====
No.	Release date	ISBN
1	August 7, 2025	978-4-06-539986-6
2	November 7, 2025	978-4-06-541545-0
3	February 9, 2026	978-4-06-539986-6

=== Anime ===
An anime television series adaptation of Shunki Gentei Ichigo Tart Jiken and Kaki Gentei Tropical Parfait Jiken, titled Shoshimin: How to Become Ordinary (小市民シリーズ, Shōshimin Shirīzu) (Note: Unlike the title of the original novel series, the anime title does not include angle brackets of fullwidth '〈〉') was announced in January 2024. It also adapted one short story from the Pari Makaron no Nazo collection. It is produced by Lapin Track and directed by Mamoru Kanbe, with Toshiya Ono writing series scripts, Atsushi Saitō designing the characters, and Takahiro Obata composing the music. The series aired from July 7 to September 15, 2024, on the NUMAnimation programming block on all ANN affiliates, including TV Asahi. (Note: TV Asahi lists the series premiere on July 6, 2024, at 25:30, which is effectively July 7 at 1:30 a.m. JST.) The opening theme song is "Sweet Memory" (スイートメモリー), performed by Eve, while the ending theme song is "Itokenai" (意解けない), performed by Ammo. Crunchyroll streamed the series worldwide, except East Asia. Medialink licensed the series in Central Asia, South Asia (except India), Southeast Asia and Oceania (except Australia and New Zealand) for streaming on Ani-One Asia's YouTube channel.

Following the final episode of the first season, a second season was announced, which adapts Shūki Gentei Kuri Kinton Jiken and Tōki Gentei Bonbon Chocolat Jiken. The season aired from April 6 to June 22, 2025, on the same programming block. (Note: TV Asahi lists the season premiere on April 5, 2025, at 25:30, which is effectively April 6 at 1:30 a.m. JST.) The opening theme song is "Kaseijin" (火星人; Martian), performed by Yorushika, while the ending theme song is "SugaRiddle", performed by Nagi Yanagi.

==== Episodes ====
===== Season 1 (2024) =====
No. overall	No. in season	Title	Directed by	Written by	Storyboarded by	Original release date
1	1	"Sheep Costume"; Transliteration: "Hitsuji no Kikugurumi" (Japanese: 羊の着ぐるみ)	Yayoi Takano	Toshiya Ono	Mamoru Kanbe	July 7, 2024
Kobato assists in investigating a minor school mystery.
2	2	"How to Make Delicious Hot Cocoa"; Transliteration: "Oishii Kokoa no Tsukurikata" (Japanese: おいしいココアの作り方)	Nobuyuki Takeuchi	Toshiya Ono	Nobuyuki Takeuchi	July 14, 2024 (Note: This episode aired at 1:40 a.m. JST, 10 minutes after the original air time on TV Asahi.)
Osanai and Kobato visit Kengo's home. They have cake and hot cocoa with his family. Kobato notices that Kengo manages to make three cups of cocoa without using the sink, which surprises him. Everyone spends time trying to uncover the mystery.
3	3	"Humpty Dumpty"; Transliteration: "Hanputi Danputi" (Japanese: ハンプティ・ダンプティ)	Takayoshi Nagatomo	Teruko Utsumi	Takayoshi Nagatomo	July 21, 2024
Osanai is looking forward to a limited-edition dessert; however, her bike is trampled and her dessert damaged. In a fit of rage, she implies that she will get revenge for this transgression.
4	4	"Mind of a Lone Wolf"; Transliteration: "Korō no Kokoro" (Japanese: 狐狼の心)	Kokun	Toshiya Ono	Takayoshi Nagatomo	August 4, 2024
Osanai's past is revealed and Kobato explains that she was known to be a vindictive psychopath. Similarly, Kobato also had a strange background, as an amateur detective. Both of them resolved to live normal lives in high school, but the bike robbery threatens to change that.
5	5	"The Berliner Pfannkuchen Mystery"; Transliteration: "Hakurin Age Pan no Nazo" (Japanese: 伯林あげぱんの謎)	Yayoi Takano	Teruko Utsumi	Takashi Kawabata	August 11, 2024 (Note: This episode aired at 2:20 a.m. JST, 50 minutes after the original air time on TV Asahi.)
The school administration blames Osanai for her bike being stolen and implies that she is a shoplifter. Kobato spends the day helping the journalism team investigate who ate a dessert with spicy mustard in it.
6	6	"But I Get To Keep Charlotte"; Transliteration: "Sharurotto Dake wa Boku no Mono" (Japanese: シャルロットだけはぼくのもの)	Miho Arai	Toshiya Ono	Rakutoku Natsu	August 18, 2024 (Note: This episode aired at 2:00 a.m. JST, 30 minutes after the original air time on TV Asahi.)
Kobato and Osanai go on a sweets tour around the city. Kobato obtains a Charlotte cake and decides to eat two of them instead of one, leaving one for Osanai. While he hides the evidence well, Osanai catches and exposes him.
7	7	"Shake Half"; Transliteration: "Sheiku・Hāfu" (Japanese: シェイク・ハーフ)	Yayoi Takano	Teruko Utsumi	Yayoi Takano	August 25, 2024
Kengo and Kobato discuss a high school drug ring. Osanai is kidnapped by the ring and ransomed for 5 million yen.
8	8	"C'mere, You Want Some Free Candy?"; Transliteration: "Oide, Kyandī o Ageru" (Japanese: おいで、キャンディーをあげる)	Takayoshi Nagatomo	Teruko Utsumi	Takayoshi Nagatomo	September 1, 2024
Kobato pieces together who kidnapped Osanai using hints Osanai left in a text message that referenced their sweets tour. He arrives at a warehouse with Kengo and finds Osanai being assaulted by several girls who threaten her with a knife. Kobato and Kengo call the police and intervene by fighting the girls. Osanai is eventually rescued, and the girls are arrested.
9	9	"Sweet Memory (Part 1)"; Transliteration: "Suīto・Memorī(Zenpen)" (Japanese: スイート・メモリー(前編))	Miho Arai	Toshiya Ono	Mamoru Kanbe	September 8, 2024
It is revealed that Osanai planned out the kidnapping with the intention of having the girls who annoyed her arrested. Kobato is left shocked by the revelation, although he himself uncovers most of the truth. Osanai reveals that she planned the framing operation out months in advance including the sweets tour she step up, she also had an insider accomplice.
10	10	"Sweet Memory (Part 2)"; Transliteration: "Suīto・Memorī(Kōhen)" (Japanese: スイート・メモリー(後編))	Minoru Yamaoka	Toshiya Ono	Mamoru Kanbe	September 15, 2024
After deducing that Osanai essentially fabricated evidence and framed the drug ring girls, he tells her that she was wrong to do so. Osanai rebuffs Kobato and tells him that she is no longer interested in spending time with him. They go their separate ways and stop speaking to each other. A new girl confesses to Kobato, and another boy approaches Osanai with the intention of dating her.

===== Season 2 (2025) =====
No. overall	No. in season	Title	Directed by	Written by	Storyboarded by	Original release date
11	1	"A Warm Winter (Part 1)"; Transliteration: "Atataka na Fuyu (Zenpen)" (Japanese: あたたかな冬（前編）)	Miho Arai	Toshiya Ono	Mamoru Kanbe	April 6, 2025
12	2	"A Warm Winter (Part 2)"; Transliteration: "Atataka na Fuyu (Kōhen)" (Japanese: あたたかな冬（前編）)	Huang Yansheng	Toshiya Ono	Satoshi Matsubara	April 13, 2025
13	3	"Hesitant Spring"; Transliteration: "Tomadō haru" (Japanese: とまどう春)	Moe Nakahara	Teruko Utsumi	Takayoshi Nagatomo	April 20, 2025
14	4	"Suspicious Summer (Part 1)"; Transliteration: "Utagawashī natsu (zenpen)" (Japanese: うたがわしい夏（前編）)	Kōsuke Kuremizu	Toshiya Ono	Kōsuke Kuremizu	April 27, 2025
15	5	"Suspicious Summer (Part 2)"; Transliteration: "Utagawashī natsu (Kōhen)" (Japanese: うたがわしい夏（後編）)	Miho Arai	Teruko Utsumi	Takashi Kawabata	May 4, 2025
16	6	"Midsummer Night"; Transliteration: "Manatsu no Yoru" (Japanese: 真夏の夜)	Shōshi Ishikawa	Teruko Utsumi	Nobuyuki Takeuchi	May 11, 2025
17	7	"Autumn Returns"; Transliteration: "Futatabi no Aki" (Japanese: ふたたびの秋)	Shingo Kaneko	Toshiya Ono	Mamoru Kanbe	May 18, 2025
18	8	"Should We Really Have Met?"; Transliteration: "Watashi-tachi Hontōni Deaubekidatta no Ka Na" (Japanese: わたしたち本当に出会うべきだったのかな)	Minoru Yamaoka	Toshiya Ono	Takashi Kawabata	May 25, 2025
19	9	"Kobato-kun and Osanai-san"; Transliteration: "Kobato-kun to Osanai-san" (Japanese: 小鳩くんと小佐内さん)	Masatoyo Takada	Teruko Utsumi	Masatoyo Takada	June 1, 2025
20	10	"Please Water the Dried Flowers"; Transliteration: "Kawaitahana ni, Dōzo o Mizu o" (Japanese: 乾いた花に、どうぞお水を)	Chika Manganji & Moe Nakahara	Toshiya Ono	Kōsuke Kuremizu	June 8, 2025
21	11	"The End of Golden Age"; Transliteration: "Koganeda to Omotte Ita Jidai no Owari" (Japanese: 黄金だと思っていた時代の終わり)	Yayoi Takano	Teruko Utsumi	Nobuyuki Takeuchi	June 15, 2025
22	12	"Just Deserts"; Transliteration: "Mukui" (Japanese: 報い)	Shingo Kaneko, Minoru Yamaoka & Miho Arai	Toshiya Ono	Mamoru Kanbe	June 22, 2025
