= Eagle Talon (TV series) =

Japanese television series

秘密結社鷹の爪 (Himitsu Kessha Taka no Tsume)
- Genre: Comedy
- Anime television series

The Frogman Show
- Directed by: Ryo Ono
- Studio: DLE
- Original network: TV Asahi
- Original run: April 6, 2006 – June 15, 2006
- Episodes: 11
- Anime television series

Eagle Talon The Countdown
- Directed by: Ryo Ono
- Studio: DLE
- Original network: TV Asahi, MBS
- Original run: October 7, 2009 – December 23, 2009
- Episodes: 12
- Anime television series

Eagle Talon Neo
- Directed by: Ryo Ono
- Studio: DLE
- Original network: NHK-E
- Original run: April 6, 2012 – February 15, 2013
- Episodes: 39
- Anime television series

Eagle Talon Max
- Directed by: Ryo Ono
- Studio: DLE
- Original network: NHK-E
- Original run: April 5, 2013 – July 12, 2013
- Anime television series

Eagle Talon Extreme
- Directed by: Ryo Ono
- Studio: DLE
- Original network: NHK-E
- Original run: April 3, 2014 – February 14, 2015
- Anime television series

Eagle Talon: Golden Spell
- Directed by: Ryo Ono
- Studio: DLE
- Licensed by: SEA: Muse Communication
- Original network: Tokyo MX
- Original run: October 4, 2020 – present
- Anime film

Eagle Talon The Movie ~Chancellor Only Live Twice~
- Directed by: Ryo Ono
- Written by: Ryo Ono
- Studio: DLE
- Released: March 17, 2007
- Runtime: 70 minutes
- Anime film

Eagle Talon The Movie II ~The Black Oolong Tea Which Loved Me~
- Directed by: Ryo Ono
- Written by: Ryo Ono
- Studio: DLE
- Released: May 24, 2008
- Runtime: 90 minutes
- Anime film

Eagle Talon THE MOVIE 3 ~http://takanotsume.jp Until Eternity~
- Directed by: Ryo Ono
- Written by: Ryo Ono
- Studio: DLE
- Released: January 16, 2010
- Runtime: 99 minutes
- Anime film

Eagle Talon THE MOVIE 4 ~The Man with Kaspersky~
- Directed by: Ryo Ono
- Written by: Ryo Ono
- Studio: DLE
- Released: June 10, 2010
- Runtime: 43 minutes
- Anime film

Eagle Talon GO ~Yoshida, Himitsukessha Yamerutteyo~
- Directed by: Ryo Ono
- Written by: Ryo Ono
- Studio: DLE
- Released: September 13, 2013
- Runtime: 109 minutes
- Anime film

Eagle Talon 6 ~Shimane wa Yatsura Da~
- Directed by: Ryo Ono
- Written by: Ryo Ono
- Studio: DLE
- Released: September 13, 2013
- Runtime: 7 minutes
- Anime film

Eagle Talon 7 ~Town Work~
- Directed by: Ryo Ono
- Written by: Ryo Ono
- Studio: DLE
- Released: April 4, 2014
- Runtime: 44 minutes
- Anime film

Eagle Talon 8 ~Yoshida-kun no Batten File~
- Directed by: Ryo Ono
- Written by: Ryo Ono
- Studio: DLE
- Released: August 20, 2016
- Runtime: 70 minutes
- Anime film

DC Super Heroes vs. Eagle Talon
- Directed by: Ryo Ono
- Written by: Ryo Ono
- Studio: DLE
- Licensed by: Warner Bros. Japan
- Released: October 21, 2017
- Runtime: 105 minutes

Eagle Talon (秘密結社 鷹の爪, Himitsu Kessha Taka no Tsume; lit. Secret Society Eagle Talon) is a Japanese Flash animation created by former Shimane Prefecture resident Ryo Ono (FROGMAN) and produced by DLE. The series turns the classic superhero formula on its head, making the ostensibly "evil" team of villains the protagonists of the story, and the traditional superhero of the series, Deluxe Fighter, a narcissistic and largely incapable bully.

== Plot ==
Eagle Talon is a secret society based in Kojimachi, Tokyo. Each episode follows Eagle Talon's attempts (and subsequent failures) to take over the world.

== Characters ==
Chancellor (総統, Sōtō)
The leader of Secret Society Eagle Talon. The Chancellor is the 55-year-old straight man of the team, and created Eagle Talon hoping to conquer the world and bring about lasting, global peace also similar-ripoff of M. Bison from Street Fighter.
Yoshida (吉田君, Yoshida-kun)
Yoshida is the 24-year-old Lieutenant of Eagle Talon, although he is depicted as perpetually looking and sounding like a small boy. Yoshida is kind-hearted but irresponsible and childish, and he is frequently the reason the group's plans fail.
Phillip (フィリップ, Firippu)
Phillip is a former heavy metal vocalist and a surprisingly savvy businessman who joins Eagle Talon as a contract employee. Despite his ferocious appearance, he is, in fact, the group's most timid member.
Doctor Leonardo (レオナルド博士, Reonarudo-hakase)
Doctor Leonardo is a genius scientist and inventor that looks like a teddy bear and is responsible for building most of the tools Eagle Talon employs in its plans for world domination. Doctor Leonardo invented the Monster Machine, a device introduced early in the series that combines living beings and everyday items to create various monsters. The Monster Machine frequently makes recurring appearances in the series.
Creepy Kid (菩薩峠君, Bosatsutōge-kun)
Creepy Kid is a small, purple-skinned boy. Little is known about his origins, but when threatened, the usually timid Creepy Kid can summon earth-shattering psychic powers.
Deluxe Fighter (デラックスファイター, Derakkusu Faitaa)
Ostensibly a superhero, Deluxe Fighter is the super-powered nemesis of Eagle Talon. Narcissistic and cowardly, Deluxe Fighter is largely devoid of heroic traits. His special move is the "Deluxe Bomber", an energy beam that Deluxe Fighter can shoot from the palm of his hand.
Many episodes in the series end with Deluxe Fighter decimating the Eagle Talon team with the Deluxe Bomber, causing a comically large explosion in the middle of Tokyo.

== Reception ==
Secret Society Eagle Talon's popularity in its native Japan is well documented. Originally conceived in 2006 as part of Frogman's "The Frogman Show" animation block on TV Asahi, the Eagle Talon franchise has expanded into a nationally recognized property, spanning six seasons, one short film, two spinoff series, eight feature-length films (including a crossover with DC Entertainment's Justice League), a number of mobile games hosted on the popular Gree and Mobage platforms, merchandise and more. Additionally, Eagle Talon's characters have been licensed for promotional campaigns. Japan Rail, Toho Cinemas, Toys 'R' Us, Capcom, Sanrio, NTT Docomo, Hulu Japan and a number of other Japanese and International businesses have promoted their products and services with Eagle Talon's characters.
