= Tama and Friends =

Japanese anime television series

- Cover of DVD volume 2

タマ&フレンズ (Tama ando Furenzu)
- Original video animation

Tama & Friends: Third Street Story
- Directed by: Tsuneo Maeda
- Studio: Group TAC
- Released: November 21, 1988 – November 1, 1990
- Runtime: 15 minutes
- Episodes: 7
- Video game

Tama and Friends: Great 3rd Street Adventure
- Developer: Advance Communication Company
- Publisher: Bandai
- Platform: Family Computer Disk System
- Released: February 23, 1989
- Anime television series

Tama of Third Street: Do You Know My Tama?
- Directed by: Tsuneo Maeda
- Studio: Group TAC
- Licensed by: Crunchyroll (streaming); NA: 4Kids Entertainment (2001-2004)
- Original network: JNN (MBS, TBS)
- English network: US: Syndication (2001)
- Original run: July 3, 1993 – September 25, 1994
- Episodes: 29
- Anime film

Tama of 3rd Street: Please! Search for Momo-chan!!
- Directed by: Tsuneo Maeda
- Studio: Group TAC
- Released: August 14, 1993
- Runtime: 90 minutes
- Video game

Tama of 3rd Street: Where is Momo-chan!
- Developer: Sega
- Publisher: Sega
- Genre: Educational
- Platform: Kids Computer Pico
- Released: July 1994
- Video game

Tama of 3rd Street: Tama and Friends - 3rd Street Ghost Panic!!
- Developer: Tom Create
- Publisher: Bandai
- Platform: Game Boy
- Released: August 5, 1994
- Video game

Tama & Friends: 3rd Street Park Tamalympics
- Developer: Aspect
- Publisher: Sega
- Platform: Game Gear
- Released: March 3, 1995
- Anime television series

Tama and Friends: Search For It! The Magic Puni-Puni Stone
- Directed by: Tsuneo Maeda
- Studio: Group TAC
- Original network: Animax; Sun TV; Tokyo MX
- Original run: May 6, 2006 – November 4, 2006
- Episodes: 26
- Anime television series

Tama and Friends: Uchi no Tama Shirimasen ka?
- Studio: Kachidoki
- Original run: October 1, 2016 – September 27, 2018
- Anime television series

Uchitama?! Have you seen my Tama?
- Directed by: Kiyoshi Matsuda
- Written by: Kimiko Ueno
- Music by: Tom-H@ck
- Studio: MAPPA; Lapin Track
- Licensed by: NA: Aniplex of America
- Original network: Fuji TV (Noitamina)
- Original run: January 9, 2020 – March 19, 2020
- Episodes: 11

Tama & Friends (タマ&フレンズ, Tama ando Furenzu) is a Japanese anime television series created by Sony Creative Products in 1983.

An OVA series based on the products titled Tama & Friends: Third Street Story (タマ&フレンズ 3丁目物語, Tama ando Furenzu San-chōme Monogatari) was produced by Sony Music Entertainment Japan and animated by Group TAC. The episodes were released between 1988 and 1990. All episodes, except the first, had two episodes put on a single cassette. The OVAs (except the first) aired on MBS and TBS under the name Tama of Third Street: Do You Know My Tama? (3丁目のタマ うちのタマ知りませんか?, San-Chōme no Tama: Uchi no Tama Shirimasen ka?) from July 3, 1993, to August 28, 1993. An anime movie, titled Tama of Third Street: Please! Find Momo-chan!! (3丁目のタマ おねがい!モモちゃんを捜して!!, San-Chōme no Tama: Onegai! Momo-chan o Sagashite!!), was released in the same year. Additional 29 episodes were created and broadcast in 1994 on the same networks under the same name. The original series was licensed by 4Kids Entertainment in 2000 with a term lasting until March 2007 and dubbed into English. This dub was syndicated in late 2001 but never made it to home video. The original series began streaming worldwide by Crunchyroll. Another anime series, known as Tama & Friends: Search for It! The Magic Puni-Puni Stone (タマ&フレンズ 探せ!魔法のプニプニストーン, Tama ando Furenzu: Sagase! Mahō no Puni-Puni Sutōn), aired on Animax in 2006.

A new series of animated shorts began airing in October 2016. It is animated in Adobe Flash. In 2016, an official Korean version of the same name based on the series, created by Daewon Media, SEGA SAMMY GROUP and produced by Toonzone Studios & CJ ENM, was released worldwide for a Western audience.

A new anime television series titled Uchi Tama!? ~Uchi no Tama Shirimasen ka?~ by MAPPA and Lapin Track premiered from January 9 to March 19, 2020, on Fuji TV's Noitamina programming block.

== Characters ==
=== Original characters ===
Tama
Voiced by: Hiroko Kasahara (1993 anime), Yumiko Kobayashi (2006 film), Ayami Tsukui (2016 anime), Soma Saito (2020 anime) (Japanese); Andrew Rannells (English)

Tama (タマ, Tama) is an energetic cat who always wants to go on new adventures. Tama is owned by Takeshi Okamoto.

Pochi
Voiced by: Masako Watanabe (1993 anime), Daisuke Kishio (2006 film), Erika Kaiho (2016 anime), Kensho Ono (2020 anime) (Japanese); Kayzie Rogers (English)

Pochi (ポチ, Pochi) (Doozle in the 4Kids dub) is a timid, yet tenderhearted dog who is Tama's best friend. He is owned by Yamada Tofu (とうふの山田, Tōfu no Yamada).

Momo
Voiced by: Hekiru Shiina (1993 anime), Yoshino Nanjo (2016 anime), Kana Hanazawa (2020 anime) (Japanese); Kerry Williams (English)

Momo (モモ, Momo) is a sweet and ladylike cat. Momo is owned by Emi Hanasaki. Tama has a secret crush on her.

Tora
Voiced by: Chika Sakamoto (1993 anime), Kaoru Katai (2016 anime), Yusuke Shirai (2020 anime) (Japanese); Jimmy Zoppi (English)

Tora (トラ, Tora) (Tiggle in the 4Kids dub) is a troublemaker that wants to convince his peers to try daredevil stunts. He is owned by Yuzuko Oketani (桶谷ゆず子, Oketani Yuzuko).

Beh
Voiced by: Sakiko Uran (1993 anime; eps 1-9), Mari Murata (1993 anime; ep 10 onwards), Karin Isobe (2016 anime), Yuma Uchida (2020 anime) (Japanese); Lisa Ortiz (English)

Beh (ベー, Bē) (Chopin in the 4Kids dub) is a black cat that knows all of the shortcuts and hidden places in the town. His English dub name, Chopin, originates from Frédéric Chopin. His owner is Banta Kawahara (河原ばん太, Kawahara Banta).

Kuro
Voiced by: Mioko Kohie (1993 anime; eps 1-9), Tetsuya Iwanaga (1993 anime; ep 10 onwards), Haruka Uno (2016 anime), Yuichiro Umehara (2020 anime) (Japanese); Jimmy Zoppi (English)

Kuro (クロ, Kuro) (Wocket in the 4Kids dub) is a hyperactive, athletic dog. He is owned by Yasushi Mikawa (三河やすし, Mikawa Yasushi).

Gon
Voiced by: Junji Kitajima (1993 anime), Haruka Kitagaito (2016 anime), Wataru Hatano (2020 anime)

Gon (ゴン, Gon) (Bengbu in the 4Kids dub) is a dog who is laid-back, often resting on the chair by his owner's shop. He is owned by Zenji Noda (野田ぜんじ, Noda Zenji).

Koma
Voiced by: Kae Araki (1993 anime), Kazusa Aranami (2016 anime), Tomoyo Kurosawa (2020 anime); Kayzie Rogers

Koma (コマ, Koma) (Pimmy in the 4Kids dub) is the youngest member of Tama's group. Her owner runs the local bathhouse.

Nora
Voiced by: Harumi Katsuta (1993 anime, eps 1-9), Yuko Tsuga (1993 anime, ep 10 onwards), Natsumi Sugita (2016 anime), Yuki Kaji (2020 anime) (Japanese); Eric Stuart (English)

Nora (ノラ, Nora) (Rockney in the 4Kids dub) is a street-smart stray cat. He previously had an owner who died of an unknown illness.

Bull
Voiced by: Taro Arakawa (1993 anime), Takurou Nakakuni (2006 film), Junichirou Kokubun (2016 anime), Tomoaki Maeno (2020 anime) (Japanese); Jerry Lobozzo (English)

Bull (ブル, Buru) (Bupkus in the 4Kids dub) is a bulldog that bullies Tama's group and has a crush on Momo. He is owned by Kaneko Kuramochi (倉持カネ子, Kuramochi Kaneko).

Takeshi Okamoto
Voiced by: Shinobu Murakami (1993 anime, eps 1-9), Hiro Yuki (1993 anime, ep 10 onwards), Misaki Shiode (2016 anime), Yuka Terasaki (2020 anime) (Japanese); Dan Green (English)

Takeshi Okamoto (岡本タケシ, Okamoto Takeshi) (Casey in the 4Kids dub) is Tama's owner, who enjoys riding his bicycle and stargazing.

Emi Hanasaki
Voiced by: Satoe Ayuhara (1993 anime, eps 1-9), Yuri Shiratori (1993 anime, ep 10 onwards), Ayane Sakura (2020 anime) (Japanese); Veronica Taylor (English)

Emi Hanasaki (花咲エミ, Hanasaki Emi) (Amy in the 4Kids dub) is Takeshi's friend and the owner of Momo. Her mother owns a flower shop and cafe.

== Episode list ==
=== Series overview ===
Season	Episodes	Originally released	
Season	Episodes	First released	Last released
1	28	July 3, 1993	September 25, 1994
2	26	May 6, 2006	November 4, 2006

=== Tama and Friends: Third Street Story ===
VHS no.	JTV no.	Title	VHS Release date	TBS/MBS airdate
1	-	"Tama & Friends: Third Street Story"; Transliteration: "Tama ando Furenzu: San-chōme Monogatari" (Japanese: タマ&フレンズ 3丁目物語)	November 21, 1988	N/A
2	4	"Have you Seen my Tama?"; Transliteration: "Uchi no Tama Shirimasen ka?" (Japanese: うちのタマ知りませんか？)	April 21, 1989	July 24, 1993
3	5	"The Story of When Tama was Born"; Transliteration: "Tama ga Umareta Toki no Hanashi" (Japanese: タマが生まれた時の話)	June 21, 1989	July 31, 1993
3	5	"Tama and Pochi's Great Adventure"; Transliteration: "Tama to Pochi no Dai Bōken" (Japanese: タマとポチの大冒険)	June 21, 1989	July 31, 1993
4	6	"Festival Night"; Transliteration: "Omatsuri no Yoru" (Japanese: おまつりの夜)	August 21, 1989	August 7, 1993
4	6	"The Third Street's Great Sports Festival"; Transliteration: "San-Chōme no Dai Undōkai" (Japanese: ３丁目の大運動会)	August 21, 1989	August 7, 1993
5	2	"Happy New Year"; Transliteration: "Akemashite Omedetō" (Japanese: あけましておめでとう)	October 21, 1989	July 10, 1993
5	2	"Takeshi's Hatsuyume"; Transliteration: "Takeshi no Hatsuyume" (Japanese: たけしの初夢)	October 21, 1989	July 10, 1993
6	1	"Christmas Eve Mystery"; Transliteration: "Kurisumasu Ibu no Nazo" (Japanese: クリスマス・イブのなぞ)	August 1, 1990	July 3, 1993
7	3	"My Most Precious Item"; Transliteration: "Boku no Taisetsuna Mono" (Japanese: ぼくの大切なもの)	November 1, 1990	July 17, 1993
7	3	"Strange Friends"; Transliteration: "Fushigina Tomodachi" (Japanese: 不思議な友達)	November 1, 1990	July 17, 1993

=== Tama of Third Street: Have You Seen My Tama? ===
No.	4Kids no.	Original title (4Kids title)	Original release date	American airdate
7a	1a	"Tama's First Love" ("Kitty Love"); Transliteration: "Tama no Hatsu Koi" (Japanese: タマのはつこい)	August 14, 1993	September 15, 2001
7b	-	"What's up, Pochi?"; Transliteration: "Pochi, Dōshita no?" (Japanese: ポチ、どうしたの?)	August 14, 1993	-
8a	-	"Are You Alright!? Tama"; Transliteration: "Daijiyobu!? Tama" (Japanese: だいじょーぶ!?タマ)	August 21, 1993	-
8b	1b	"Tama, Caught a Balloon" ("A Present For Momo"); Transliteration: "Tama, Fūsen o Tsukamaete" (Japanese: タマ、風船をつかまえて)	August 21, 1993	September 15, 2001
9	-	"Tama's Scary Story"; Transliteration: "Tama no Kowai Ohanashi" (Japanese: タマのこわーいお話)	August 28, 1993	-
9	-	"It's Tama's Secret"; Transliteration: "Tama ni wa Naishoda yo" (Japanese: タマにはナイショだよ)	August 28, 1993	-
10	-	"Tama & Friends"; Transliteration: "Tama ando Furenzu" (Japanese: タマ&フレンズ)	April 3, 1994	-
10	-	"Tama the Freshman"; Transliteration: "Tama wa Shinnyūsei" (Japanese: タマは新入生)	April 3, 1994	-
11a	12a	"Have You Seen Ribiribi?" ("One Green Afternoon"); Transliteration: "Ribiribi Shirimasen ka?" (Japanese: リビリビ知りませんか？)	April 10, 1994	December 8, 2001
11b	8a	"My Favorite" ("Tama's New Friend"); Transliteration: "Boku no Okinīri" (Japanese: ぼくのお気にいり)	April 10, 1994	November 3, 2001
12	4	"The Legend of King Pochi" ("Doozle Saves the Day"); Transliteration: "Ōja Pochi no Densetsu" (Japanese: 王者ポチの伝説)	April 17, 1994	October 6, 2001
12	4	"Steal it! The Treasure in the Pond" ("The Depths"); Transliteration: "Ubae! Ike no Naka no Takara" (Japanese: 奪え!池の中のたから)	April 17, 1994	October 6, 2001
13a	3b	"Chasing Momo's Bell" ("Momo's Bell"); Transliteration: "Momo no Suzu o Oikakete" (Japanese: モモの鈴を追いかけて)	April 24, 1994	September 29, 2001
13b	8b	"Grab the Cloud! Tora" ("Cloud Cat"); Transliteration: "Kumo o Tsukame! Tora" (Japanese: 雲をつかめ！トラ)	April 24, 1994	November 3, 2001
14a	9a	"Showdown in May" ("The Showdown"); Transliteration: "Kessen wa Go-tsuki" (Japanese: 決戦は５月)	May 1, 1994	November 10, 2001
14b	6a	"The Day Buru Cried" ("The Day Bupkus Cried"); Transliteration: "Buru ga Naita hi" (Japanese: ブルが泣いた日)	May 1, 1994	October 20, 2001
15a	-	"Mystery of the Hot Water Pine Trees"; Transliteration: "Matsu no Yu no Nazo" (Japanese: 松のゆのなぞ)	May 8, 1994	-
15b	9b	"Sold Hero" ("Bengbu's Friend"); Transliteration: "Urareta Hīrō" (Japanese: 売られたヒーロー)	May 8, 1994	November 10, 2001
16a	10a	"Koma's Seven Names" ("No Place Like Home"); Transliteration: "Koma no Nanatsu no Namae" (Japanese: コマの七つの名前)	May 15, 1994	November 17, 2001
16b	6b	"Finding the Video Camera" ("The Tama and Momo Show"); Transliteration: "Bideo Kamera de Oikakete" (Japanese: ビデオカメラで追いかけて)	May 15, 1994	October 20, 2001
17a	2a	"Third Street Labyrinth" ("Top Secret Tama"); Transliteration: "San-Chōme Rabirinsu" (Japanese: 3丁目ラビリンス)	May 22, 1994	September 22, 2001
17b	10b	"Two Strays" ("Stray Cats"); Transliteration: "Futari no Nora" (Japanese: ふたりのノラ)	May 22, 1994	November 17, 2001
18a	13a	"Evening at the Department Store" ("Shopping Mall Slumber Party"); Transliteration: "Depāto de Konban wa" (Japanese: デパートで今晩は)	May 29, 1994	December 15, 2001
18b	-	"Kuro's Midnight"; Transliteration: "Mayonaka no Kuro" (Japanese: 真夜中のクロ)	May 29, 1994	-
19a	5a	"Beh is Full" ("Poster Cat"); Transliteration: "Bē ga Ippai" (Japanese: ベーがいっぱい)	June 5, 1994	October 13, 2001
19b	-	"The Legend of Genius Pochi"; Transliteration: "Tensai Pochi no Densetsu" (Japanese: 天才ポチの伝説)	June 5, 1994	-
20a	2b	"Let's be Friends" ("Hot Air Havoc"); Transliteration: "Tomodachi ni Narou ze" (Japanese: 友達になろうぜ)	June 12, 1994	September 22, 2001
20b	-	"Tail Viewing Dream"; Transliteration: "Shippo ga Miru Yume" (Japanese: しっぽがみる夢)	June 12, 1994	-
21a	12b	"Bringing out Courage" ("Treasure Map Tama"); Transliteration: "Yūki o Dashite" (Japanese: 勇気をだして)	June 19, 1994	December 8, 2001
21b	5b	"Welcome! Takeshi-kun" ("Casey and Friends"); Transliteration: "Yōkoso! Takeshi-kun" (Japanese: ようこそ!たけしくん)	June 19, 1994	October 13, 2001
22	-	"Cat Origins (Part one)" Transliteration: "Neko no Sujō (Zenpen)" (Japanese: 猫ノ巣城（前編）)	June 26, 1994	-
22	-	"Cat Origins (Part two)" Transliteration: "Neko no Sujō (Kōhen)" (Japanese: 猫ノ巣城（後編）)	June 26, 1994	-
23	7	"Smiling Tulips" ("Cousin Jeannie"); Transliteration: "Waratte yo Chūrippu" (Japanese: わらってよチューリップ)	July 3, 1994	October 27, 2001
23	7	"Our Stardust" ("Star Search"); Transliteration: "Boku-tachi no Hoshikuzu" (Japanese: ぼくたちの星くず)	July 3, 1994	October 27, 2001
24a	3a	"Tail Goal!!" ("Goal!"); Transliteration: "Shippo de Gōru!!" (Japanese: しっぽでゴール!!)	July 10, 1994	September 29, 2001
24b	-	"We are Friends! Tama Ondo"; Transliteration: "Bokura wa Nakama da! Tama Ondo" (Japanese: ボクらは仲間だ! タマ音頭)	July 10, 1994	-
25	11	"A Penguin-!?" ("Someone New In Town"); Transliteration: "Pengin Da-!?" (Japanese: ペンギンだぁーっ!?)	July 17, 1994	November 24, 2001
25	11	"Playing with a Skateboard" ("Skate Show"); Transliteration: "Sukebō de Asobo" (Japanese: スケボーであそぼー)	July 17, 1994	November 24, 2001
26a	13b	"Gon's Errand" ("The Watch Dog"); Transliteration: "Gon no Otsukai" (Japanese: ゴンのお使い)	July 24, 1994	December 15, 2001
26b	-	"Matsuri-bayashi"; Transliteration: "Matsuri-bayashi" (Japanese: まつりばやし)	July 24, 1994	-
27	-	"Paradise of Crabs (Part one)" Transliteration: "Paradaisu Obu Kanikan (Zenpen)" (Japanese: パラダイス・オブ・カニカン（前編）)	July 31, 1994	-
27	-	"Paradise of Crabs (Part two)" Transliteration: "Paradaisu Obu Kanikan (Kōhen)" (Japanese: パラダイス・オブ・カニカン（後編）)	July 31, 1994	-
28	-	"Our Last Day in Third Street"; Transliteration: "San-Chōme Saigo no Hi" (Japanese: 3丁目最後の日)	August 7, 1994	-
28	-	"Dirty-Faced Angel"; Transliteration: "Kegareta-gao no Enjeru" (Japanese: 汚れた顔のエンジェル)	August 7, 1994	-
29	-	"Wandering Collar"; Transliteration: "Samayoeru Kubiwa" (Japanese: さまよえる首輪)	August 14, 1994	-
29	-	"The Legend of Devil Pochi"; Transliteration: "Debiru Pochi no Densetsu" (Japanese: デビル・ポチの伝説)	August 14, 1994	-
Special episode broadcast on the 50th anniversary of the atomic bombings of Hiroshima and Nagasaki. Sony - the parent company of Sony Creative Products - was founded one month after Japan surrendered at the end of World War II, and two months after the bombings.
30	-	"Naughty Paint War"; Transliteration: "Wanpaku Enogu Sensō" (Japanese: わんぱく絵の具戦争)	August 21, 1994	-
30	-	"Whisper Whistle"; Transliteration: "Fue no Sasayaki" (Japanese: 笛のささやき)	August 21, 1994	-
31	-	"Goodbye Tama Robot"; Transliteration: "Sayonara Tama Robotto" (Japanese: サヨナラ タマ・ロボット)	August 28, 1994	-
31	-	"Goodbye Tama Robot 2"; Transliteration: "Sayonara Tama Robotto Tsū" (Japanese: サヨナラ タマ・ロボット2)	August 28, 1994	-
32	-	"Black Lightning"; Transliteration: "Kuroi Inazuma" (Japanese: 黒い稲妻)	September 4, 1994	-
32	-	"Chasing a Picnic"; Transliteration: "Ensoku o Oikakete" (Japanese: 遠足を追いかけて)	September 4, 1994	-
33	-	"It's Naniwabushi! Buru's Life"; Transliteration: "Naniwabushi da yo! Buru Jinsei" (Japanese: 浪花節だよ!ブル人生)	September 11, 1994	-
33	-	"Cool! Masked Buru"; Transliteration: "Ikasu ze! Buru Kamen" (Japanese: イカスぜ!ブル仮面)	September 11, 1994	-
34	-	"It's Clear! Tama"; Transliteration: "Hakkirishite yo! Tama" (Japanese: はっきりしてよ!タマ)	September 18, 1994	-
34	-	"We are not Angels"; Transliteration: "Boku-tachi ha Tenshi ja nai" (Japanese: ボクたちは天使じゃない)	September 18, 1994	-
35	-	"Captain Cat Tama"; Transliteration: "Kyaputen Kyatto Tama" (Japanese: キャプテン キャット★タマ)	September 25, 1994	-

=== Tama & Friends: Do You Know My Tama? ===
Tama & Friends: Do You Know My Tama? (タマ&フレンズ 〜うちのタマ知りませんか?〜, Tama to Furenzu: Uchi no Tama Shirimasen ka?) began airing on Tokyo MX and CTV in October 2016.

=== Uchitama?! Have you seen my Tama? ===
Uchitama?! Have you seen my Tama? (うちタマ?! ～うちのタマ知りませんか？～, Uchi Tama!? ~Uchi no Tama Shirimasen ka?~) is a spin-off series created in 2017, which reimagines the cast of the franchise as humans. In June 2019, an anime adaptation by MAPPA and Lapin Track was announced. It aired on Fuji TV's Noitamina block from January 9 to March 19, 2020. The series is directed by Kiyoshi Matsuda, with Kimiko Ueno handling series composition, Mai Otsuka designing the characters, and Tom-H@ck composing the music. wacci performed the series' opening theme song "Friends" while Soma Saito performed the ending theme "Hidamari o Sagashite" (ひだまりを探して, Hidamari o sagashite; "Searching for a Sunny Spot"). Aniplex of America licensed the series in North American territories.

== Video games ==
The first Tama and Friends video game, Tama and Friends: Great Third Street Adventure (タマ＆フレンズ 3丁目大冒険, Tama ando Furenzu: San-chōme Dai Bōken) was released in 1989 for the Famicom Disk System.

The second game, Tama of 3rd Street: Where is Momo-chan! (３丁目のタマ モモちゃんはどこ！, San-Chōme no Tama: Momo-chan wa Doko!) was released in July 1994 for the Sega Pico.

The third game, Tama of 3rd Street: Tama and Friends - Third Street Ghost Panic!! (3丁目のタマ タマ＆フレンズ 3丁目おばけパニック！！, San-Chōme no Tama: Tama ando Furenzu - San-chōme Obake Panikku!!) was released in August 1994 for the Game Boy.

The fourth game, Tama & Friends: 3 Choume Kouen Tamalympic (タマ＆フレンズ 3丁目公園タマリンピック, Tama ando Furenzu: San-chōme Kōen Tamarinpikku) was released in 1995 for the Game Gear.
