= The Days of Diamond =

Japanese manga series

- First tankōbon volume cover

ダイヤモンドの功罪 (Daiyamondo no Kōzai)
- Genre: Coming-of-age; Sports
- Manga
- Written by: Ōhashi Hirai
- Published by: Shueisha
- Imprint: Young Jump Comics
- Magazine: Weekly Young Jump
- Original run: February 9, 2023 – present
- Volumes: 11
- Anime television series
- Directed by: Takayoshi Nagatomo; Chigusa Kiyota (assistant)
- Written by: Teruko Utsumi
- Studio: Lapin Track
- icon

The Days of Diamond (Japanese: ダイヤモンドの功罪, Hepburn: Daiyamondo no Kōzai) is a Japanese manga series written and illustrated by Ōhashi Hirai. It has been serialized in Shueisha's seinen manga magazine Weekly Young Jump since February 2023. The story follows Jiro Ayasegawa, a gifted fifth-grader who joins a little league baseball team to make friends, only to be pushed toward a competitive path.

An anime television series adaptation produced by Lapin Track has been announced.

== Plot ==
Jiro Ayasegawa is a fifth-grader who is immensely talented in sports, but finds only misery in his successes—he desperately wants to make friends in sports, but is ostracized by his peers whenever he outperforms them. Seeing a flyer for the Adachi Bambies, an amateur little league team, he decides to try baseball, with the hope that a team sport like baseball means that everyone is on his side. However, the team coach sees his potential as a pitcher and decides to have him try out for the national teams.

== Media ==
=== Manga ===
Written and illustrated by Ōhashi Hirai, The Days of Diamond started in Shueisha's seinen manga magazine Weekly Young Jump on February 9, 2023. Shueisha has collected its chapters into individual tankōbon volumes. The first volume was released on June 19, 2023. As of November 18, 2026, eleven volumes have been released.

The series is simultaneously published in English on Shueisha's Manga Plus web platform.

==== Volumes ====
No.	Japanese release date	Japanese ISBN
1	June 19, 2023	978-4-08-892767-1
2	July 19, 2023	978-4-08-892768-8
3	October 19, 2023	978-4-08-892864-7
4	December 19, 2023	978-4-08-893071-8
5	March 18, 2024	978-4-08-893205-7
6	June 19, 2024	978-4-08-893266-8
7	September 19, 2024	978-4-08-893383-2
8	April 17, 2025	978-4-08-893509-6
9	December 18, 2025	978-4-08-893586-7
10	July 17, 2026	978-4-08-893835-6
11	November 18, 2026	978-4-08-894272-8

=== Anime ===
On November 17, 2026, it was announced that the manga would receive an anime television series adaptation. It will be produced by Lapin Track and directed by Takayoshi Nagatomo, with Chigusa Kiyota serving as assistant director, Teruko Utsumi handling series composition and scripts, and Kumiko Yanagisawa designing the characters.

== Reception ==
The series ranked seventh in the ninth Next Manga Award in the print category in 2023. The series topped Takarajimasha's Kono Manga ga Sugoi! list of best manga of 2024 for male readers. The series has been nominated for the 17th Manga Taishō in 2024, and placed fifth with 56 points. The series ranked fourth in the Nationwide Bookstore Employees' Recommended Comics of 2024 list. It ranked 25th on the 2024 "Book of the Year" list by Da Vinci magazine.
