= Dry low emission =

Nitrous oxide filtration technology

Dry low emission (abbreviation DLE) is a technology that reduces NOx emissions that exhausts out of gas fired turbines.

The amount of NOx produced depends on the combustion temperature. When the combustion takes place at a lower temperature the NOx emissions are reduced. Gas turbines with DLE technology were developed to achieve lower emissions without using water or steam to reduce combustion temperature (Wet Low Emission (WLE) technology). WLE technology demands cleaning of large amounts of water, is heavy, takes more space and can be difficult to install offshore. A DLE combustor uses the principle of lean premixed combustion, and is similar to the SAC combustor (Single Annular Combustor) with some exceptions. A DLE combustor takes up more space than a SAC turbine and if the turbine is changed it can not be connected directly to existing equipment without considerable changes in the positioning of the equipment. The SAC turbine has one single concentric ring where the DLE turbine has two or three rings with premixers depending on gas turbine type. DLE technology demands an advanced control system with a large number of burners. DLE results in lower NOx emissions because the process is run with less fuel and air, the temperature is lower and combustion takes place at a lower temperature.

DLE technology can avoid the heat-rate penalty associated with water or steam injection of NOx control. Modern DLE combustors have demonstrated NOx reductions of up to 97%, although reported reductions depend not he combustion system and comparison baseline. Conventional diffusion combustion systems may produce NOx emissions of approximately 15-25 ppm, while modern DLE systems operating on natural gas can achieve single-digit concentrations, with some systems reporting levels as low as 9 ppm. When combined with post-combustion Selective Catalytic Reduction (SCR), DLE systems can achieve overall NOx emissions below 2.5 ppm.

== Background for the technology ==
Increased focus on environmental issues led to increased research on new and better gas turbines with water and steam cooling methods in the middle of the 1970s. The best technology could in 1980 reduce NOx emissions to 42 ppm and this was later reduced to 25 ppm. In the 1990s ammonium and catalysators was tested and late in the 1980s the turbine producers started to develop "Dry Low Emission-technology" (DLE) to be able to get around the technology that demanded water or steam injection. During the next ten years the DLE technology was developed and installed in many places leading to a reduction of NOx emissions less than 25 ppm. It is difficult to achieve less than 9 ppm NOx emissions with DLE turbines. To achieve a reduction from 25 ppm to 9 ppm more than 6 percent air must pass through the premixer. Newer generations of DLE burners have an extra injection leading to better control. Additional systems like "selective catalytic reduction" (SCR) are necessary to achieve emissions lower than 2.5 ppm. Technologies using water or steam (Wet Low Emission (WLE)) can achieve approximately the same level of NOx emissions (25–42 ppm) when they lower the combustion temperature.

=== Operating Principles and Flame Kinetics ===
NOx formation in gas turbine combustors is primarily by thermal NOx which is governed by Zeldovich reaction mechanisms. This reaction mechanism explains that the rate of thermal NOx production increases exponentially with flame temperature. In conventional diffusion flame combustors, fuel and air are injected separately wand burn at locally, creating "hot spots" with peak temperatures between 1,871 °C and 1,927 °C (3,400 °F–3,500 °F) where atmospheric nitrogen oxidizes rapidly.

DLE combustors are able to suppress thermal NOx by utilizing lean-premixed (LPM) combustion, which thoroughly mixes air and fuel upstream of the combustion chamber. DLE systems typically operate at air-to-stoichiometric-air equivalence ratios, between 1.4 and 3.0 (supplying approximately twice the air that is theoretically required for stoichiometric combustions). This produces a homogeneous mixture that is able to limit peak firing temperatures, with some system staying under 1,538°C (2,800 °F). By limiting these temperatures, DLE systems reduce the rate of thermal NOx formation.

Below is a table that shows the performance and emissions of different types of combustion technology compared to each other and their NOx emissions.

Performance & Emissions Comparison Table
Combustion Technology	Typical NOx Emissions (ppmvd @15% NOx)	Diluent Injection Required	Thermal Efficiency Impact	Primary Advantages	Key Operations Limits/Trade Offs
Conventional Diffusion	>70 ppm	None	Baseline	Maximum flame stability; wide fuel tolerance	High thermal NOx emissions
Wet Low Emission (WLE)	25-42 ppm	Demineralized water or stream	Heat rate penalty (energy lost through vaporizing water)	Simple combustor design geometry; retrofittable	High water use; high variable cost; dynamic pressure wear
Dry Low Emission (DLE)	5-25 ppm	None (Air premixing)	High efficiency (no water heat sink penalty)	Up to 97% NOx reduction; zero water use	Vulnerable to Lean Blowout (LBO), flashback, and acoustic oscillations
DLE + Selective Catalytic Reduction (SCR)	<2.5 ppm	Ammonia/Urea (Post-Combustion)	Minor backpressure penalty	Meets lowest achievable emissions rate (LAER) standard	Higher capital cost; catalyst degradation; potential ammonia slip/exposure

== Use of DLE-technology in the world ==
This is not a complete list, but examples of where and when DLE technology has been implemented or are planned to be implemented.

In Europe

DLE turbines were introduced offshore in Norway in 1998. All gas turbines installed offshore in Norway after year 2000 which uses only gas as fuel are DLE-turbines. The Kårstø facilities were planned with DLE technology. DLE technology is used by Statoil ASA, Hammerfest LNG. The Norwegian Storting has decided that the Gina Krogh platform shall not be equipped with DLE technology due to the fact that all off Utsirahøyden will have electrical power supplies from the mainland.

30 April 2012 a gas turbine generator with DLE technology was opened in Waidhaus in Bavaria in Germany.

In North America

In Alberta in Canada it was in 2003 planned to use DLE technology in the power supplies.

In Oceania

DLE is planned to be used in Australia.

In Asia

The Malampaya field in the Republic of the Philippines was awarded in August 1998, construction of the topside was begun in June 1999 and completed on 28 March. 2001. The topside was equipped with the world's first RB211 with DLE technology.

=== Modern Application ===
Modern commercial DLE implementations cover industrial frame gas turbines and aeroderivative engines. While this is a short list, there are certainly more applications of these systems available.

==== Aeroderivative Gas Turbines ====
Multi-dome combustors, such as the double and triple annular dome designs used in GE LM1600, LM2500, and LM6000 turbines, utilize radial and circumferential fuel staging to maintain lean-premixed operation across broad load ranges. Specialized features like Enhanced Lean Blowout (ELBO) fuel injection and active control logic (such as Acoustics and Blowout Avoidance Logic, ABAL) help stabilize the flame and suppress acoustic noise.

==== Industrial Frame Turbines ====
Industrial turbines such as the EGT Typhoon utilize radial inward injection pilot burners and swirler slot optimization to achieve NOx levels below 10 ppmvd.

==== Compact Industrial Systems ====
Manufacturers such as Kawasaki have commercialized single-digit and 15 ppm DLE systems for small to medium industrial gas turbines (such as the GPB17D and GPB50D series). This is accomplished by using customized air-bleed systems for partial-load emission compliance.

== Operational Challenges and Predictive Diagnostics ==
Operating near a lean stability boundary introduces operational vulnerabilities that differ from conventional diffusion combustion.

- Lean Blowout (LBO): LBO occurs when the air-fuel mixture becomes excessively lean and reaches the flame's extinguishing limit. This results in a flameout and can potentially cause an unexpected turbine trip. LBO is a significant cause of unscheduled trips in DLE-equipped gas turbines.
- Flashback: Flashback occurs when the local turbulent flame speed goes too fast and exceeds the flow velocity within the premixed duct. This causes the flame to propagate further upstream toward the fuel-air mixing region.
- Auto-Ignition: Auto-Ignition occurs if the residence time of the fuel-air mixture inside the premixing duct exceeds the fuel auto-ignition delay time (ADT), causing the mixture to ignite prior to reaching the combustion chamber. Similar to flashback, this can cause a flame further upstream near the fuel-air mixing region.
- Combustion Dynamics: Thermoacoustic instabilities arise when heat release oscillations that couple with acoustic pressure waves in the combustor. This combination produces dynamic pressure fluctuations that can cause structural fatigue or hardware damage to the DLE.

=== Predictive Diagnostics and Machine Learning ===
Real-time diagnostic systems can help prevent LBO trips and dynamic combustion instability by identifying potentially unsafe operating conditions. A 2023 study using industrial plant data used a hybrid Extreme Gradient Boosting (XGBoost) and K-Means clustering model in order to classify combustion temperatures into different operating ranges. The model identified optimal operating temperature ranges between 744.68 °C to 829.64 °C. Temperatures below this operating range saw an increase in the risk of LBO and temperatures above the range saw an increase in NOx emissions. These diagnostic systems can alert plant operators to potentially unsafe conditions before they result in turbine trips or increased air emissions.
