= Lapin Track =

Japanese animation studio

Lapin Track, Inc.
- Native name: ラパントラック 合同会社
- Romanized name: Rapan Torakku Gōdō-gaisha
- Type: Kabushiki gaisha
- Industry: Japanese animation
- Founded: June 30, 2014; 12 years ago
- Founder: Teruko Utsumi; Masakazu Watanabe
- Headquarters: Nishi-Ogikubo, Suginami, Tokyo, Japan
- Key people: Teruko Utsumi; Masakazu Watanabe
- Number of employees: 30 (Note: Includes both employees and contracted outsource workers.)
- Website: lapintrack.com

Lapin Track, Inc. (Japanese: ラパントラック合同会社, Hepburn: Rapan Torakku Gōdō-gaisha) is a Japanese animation studio based in Nishi-Ogikubo, Tokyo.

== History ==
Lapin Track was established on June 30, 2014 by ex-Brain's Base screenwriter Teruko Utsumi and ex-Brain's Base/MAPPA producer Masakazu Watanabe.

== Works ==
=== Television series ===
Title	Director	Start Date	End Date	Eps	Note(s)	Ref.
Endride	Keiji Gotoh	April 3, 2016	September 24, 2016	24	Part of a multimedia franchise. Co-animated with Brain's Base.	
Sarazanmai	Kunihiko Ikuhara; Nobuyuki Takeuchi	April 11, 2019	June 20, 2019	11	Original work. Co-animated with MAPPA.	
Uchitama?! Have you seen my Tama?	Kiyoshi Matsuda	January 9, 2020	March 19, 2020	11	Based on a franchise by Sony Creative Products Inc. Co-animated with MAPPA.	
I'm Kodama Kawashiri	Shingo Kaneko	January 14, 2022	August 12, 2022	24	Based on a manga written by Kodama Kawashiri.	
Undead Girl Murder Farce	Mamoru Hatakeyama	July 6, 2023	September 28, 2023	13	Based on a novel series written by Yugo Aosaki.	
Shoshimin: How to Become Ordinary	Mamoru Kanbe	July 7, 2024	September 15, 2024	10	Based on a novel series written by Honobu Yonezawa.	
Shoshimin: How to Become Ordinary (season 2)	Mamoru Kanbe	April 6, 2025	June 22, 2025	12	Sequel to Shoshimin: How to Become Ordinary.	
You and I Are Polar Opposites	Takayoshi Nagatomo	January 11, 2026	October 4, 2026	25	Based on a manga written by Kōcha Agasawa.	
The Days of Diamond	Takayoshi Nagatomo	TBA	TBA	TBA	Based on a manga written by Ōhashi Hirai.	

=== Original video animations ===
Title	Director	Start Date	End Date	Eps	Note(s)	Ref.
Wotakoi: Love Is Hard for Otaku	Yayoi Takano	February 26, 2021	October 14, 2021	2	Related to Wotakoi: Love Is Hard for Otaku.	
Onna no Sono no Hoshi	Mamoru Hatakeyama	December 8, 2022		1	Based on a manga written by Yama Wayama.	

=== Films ===
Title	Director	Release date	Runtime	Note(s)	Ref.
Re:cycle of Penguindrum	Kunihiko Ikuhara	April 29, 2022 (part 1); July 22, 2022 (part 2)	124m (part 1); 142m (part 2)	Recap of Penguindrum.	
