= The Human Bug University =

Japanese YouTube manga series

- Anime key visual

ヒューマンバグ大学 (Hyūman Bagu Daigaku)
- Manga

ヒューマンバグ大学 闇の漫画 (Hyūmanbagu Daigaku Yami no Manga)
- Published by: K Contents
- Magazine: YouTube
- Original run: March 25, 2019 – present
- Anime television series

ヒューマンバグ大学 -不死学部不幸学科-(Hyūmanbagu Daigaku-Fushi Gakubu Fukō Gakka-)
- Directed by: Tsukasa Nishiyama
- Written by: Naotoshi Nakajima
- Music by: Kosuke Yamashita
- Studio: DLE
- Licensed by: Crunchyroll; SA/SEA: Medialink
- Original network: Tokyo MX, Sun TV, BS Fuji, AT-X
- Original run: October 5, 2022 – December 21, 2022
- Episodes: 12

The Human Bug University (ヒューマンバグ大学, Hyūman Bagu Daigaku) is a Japanese manga series published by K Contents. It has been serialized online via YouTube with voiced narration and dialogue since March 2019. An anime television series adaptation by DLE aired from October to December 2022.

== Characters ==
Hirofumi Satake (佐竹博文, Satake Hirofumi)
Voiced by: Tomokazu Sugita
Chie Negishi (根岸千恵, Negishi Chie)
Voiced by: Yui Ogura
Jōji Kitō (鬼頭丈二, Kitō Jōji)
Voiced by: Hiroki Takahashi
Shigeo Ijūin (伊集院茂夫, Ijūin Shigeo)
Voiced by: Takehito Koyasu
Jack (ジャック, Jakku)
Voiced by: Soma Saito
Professor
Voiced by: Hidenari Ugaki
Shimoda (下田正)
Voiced by: Yuma Uchida
Takao Rukawa (流川隆雄, Rukawa Takao)
Voiced by: Ryōta Suzuki
Chihaya Godai (伍代千隼, Godai Chihaya)
Voiced by: Hikaru Midorikawa

== Media ==
=== Anime ===
An anime television series adaptation by DLE was announced on May 1, 2022. The series is directed by Tsukasa Nishiyama and written by Naotoshi Nakajima, with Nishiyama as character designer, Masakatsu Omuro as sound director, and Kosuke Yamashita as music composer. It aired from October 5 to December 21, 2022, on Tokyo MX and other channels. The opening theme song "Catastrophe" is performed by Nano, while the ending theme song "Bad City (Bug Human)" is performed by Lowland Jazz. Crunchyroll streamed the series. Medialink licensed the series in Asia-Pacific.
