= I'm Quitting Heroing =

Japanese light novel series and its adaptations

- I'm Quitting Heroing: Next Gig Is at the Demon Queen's Castle
- First light novel volume cover, featuring Leo Demonheart and the Elite Four

勇者、辞めます～次の職場は魔王城～ (Yūsha, Yamemasu: Tsugi no Shokuba wa Maōjō)
- Genre: Fantasy
- Novel series
- Written by: Quantum
- Published by: Kakuyomu
- Original run: January 12, 2017 – February 7, 2017
- Light novel
- Written by: Quantum
- Illustrated by: Hana Amano
- Published by: Fujimi Shobo
- English publisher: NA: Kadokawa
- Imprint: Kadokawa Books (original print); Fujimi Fantasia Bunko (reprint)
- Original run: December 10, 2017 – October 10, 2018
- Volumes: 3
- Manga
- Written by: Quantum
- Illustrated by: Nori Kazato
- Published by: Kadokawa Shoten
- English publisher: NA: Kadokawa Yen Press
- Magazine: Young Ace Up
- Original run: May 31, 2018 – June 2, 2023
- Volumes: 8
- Anime television series
- Directed by: Yuu Nobuta (Note: Credited as Chief Director (総監督, Sō Kantoku).); Hisashi Ishii
- Written by: Shigeru Murakoshi
- Music by: Kōhei Munemoto
- Studio: EMT Squared
- Licensed by: Sentai Filmworks: SA/SEA: Medialink
- Original network: AT-X, Tokyo MX, BS11, MBS
- English network: SEA: Animax Asia
- Original run: April 5, 2022 – June 21, 2022
- Episodes: 12 + 2 OVAs
- icon

I'm Quitting Heroing: Next Gig Is at the Demon Queen's Castle (勇者、辞めます～次の職場は魔王城～, Yūsha, Yamemasu: Tsugi no Shokuba wa Maōjō) is a Japanese fantasy light novel series written by Quantum and illustrated by Hana Amano. It was serialized online from January to February 2017 on Kadokawa's user-generated novel publishing website Kakuyomu. It was later published by Fujimi Shobo with three volumes from December 2017 to October 2018 under their Kadokawa Books imprint. A manga adaptation with art by Nori Kazato has been serialized online via Kadokawa Shoten's Young Ace Up website since May 2018 and has been collected in eight tankōbon volumes. Both the light novel and manga are licensed in North America by Kadokawa, with Yen Press handling the manga's physical release. An anime television series adaptation produced by EMT Squared aired from April to June 2022.

== Plot ==
In a medieval yet futuristic time, the Demon Queen Echidna and her forces have come from a polluted wasteland called Demon World. The world's strongest hero, Leo Demonheart, has defeated Echidna and her Elite Four. Sometime later, Leo shows up wanting to help Echidna rebuild her army because the human populace became fearful of him instead of celebrating his victory, as some people worried that he would become the next demon king. As a result of his exile, Leo wants to help Echidna, but she violently rejects his offer. The Elite Four go behind her back by having Leo help rebuild Echidna's army anyway. He also learns that Echidna wants to obtain the Philosopher's Stone so that she can make the Demon World fertile again.

Leo's flashbacks reveal that the story is in the 51st century; technology and knowledge were lost due to the previous Demon Lord invading Earth in the 21st century and causing World War III. With the loss of machinery, humans adapted to the magic of demons. He himself was one of the experiments and has been programmed to be a hero, but after countless victories and being unable to die or lose, he desires to be free of his painful life.

== Characters ==
Leo Demonheart (レオ・デモンハート, Reo Demonhāto)
Voiced by: Kensho Ono (Japanese); Joe Daniels (English)
He started out as the world's strongest hero who defeated Echidna. Leo is actually 3000 years old because of an experiment done by the scientists of Tokyo as part of their Demonheart experiment, and is the only member involved that didn't die in battle. Because of a rumor that he might become the new demon king, people became fearful of Leo and he was exiled by the human king; aggravated by their scorning of his good will, Leo decided humans don't deserve to exist. It didn't help that his Hero party were incompetent and made Leo abandon them to take care of his job himself. This caused him to side with Echidna's forces, only to be rejected by her. To get into Echidna's army, Leo takes on a disguise and the alias of Black Knight Onyx and convinces the Elite Four to help him without Echidna knowing. Once Echidna learns the truth and he is freed from his programming after finally losing at the hands of his friends, he officially becomes a member of Echidna's army and may have developed feelings for Echidna (although whether this is true or not is never confirmed).
Echidna (エキドナ, Ekidona)
Voiced by: Kaede Hondo (Japanese); Olivia Swasey (English)
The Demon Queen with long pink hair and black horns who is the daughter of Cychreus. Echidna came from the Demon World to obtain the Philosopher's Stone, hoping it would make the Demon World habitable, only to be defeated by Leo Demonheart. While Echidna does not want Leo to join up with her, the Elite Four go behind her back by having Leo work to rebuild Echidna's army in secret. For an unknown reason, Echidna didn't have her soldiers kill the humans which led to her defeat. Once Leo is freed from his programing as a hero, she finally accepts him as a member of her army and may possibly have feelings for him.
Shutina (シュティーナ, Shutīna)
Voiced by: Shizuka Itō (Japanese); Luci Christian (English)
A magic-using succubus who is the servant of Echidna and member of the Elite Four; she has no combat utility outside of that. She is embarrassed by her race's stereotype, which Leo points out; instead, she is refined and cares more about her subordinates.
Lili (リリ, Riri)
Voiced by: Hitomi Ōwada (Japanese); Christina Kelly (English)
The barefoot and animalistic servant of Echidna and the smallest member of the Elite Four. Lili is unfortunately mentally unfit for the job, as all her mission reports look like something a grade schooler would do for homework; though she has a big heart, wanting everyone to enjoy their lives. As a demi-beastperson, Lili sports wolf-like ears, a wolf-like tail, and commands the beastpeople in Echidna's army. Her kind has the law that if someone of the opposite sex beats them in battle, they are meant to be their mate; hence why she wants to marry Leo so badly, even if he always rejects her. Lili also has the ability to transform into a Fenrir.
Mernes (メルネス, Merunesu)
Voiced by: Yumi Uchiyama (Japanese); Patricia Duran (English)
A teenaged servant of Echidna and member of the Elite Four. He is a human/demon hybrid who hides part of his face under the hood part of his cowl. At a young age, Melnes was sold into child slavery which led to him siding with Echidna's forces. To learn how to interact with people, due to being so taciturn, Melnes goes undercover as a waitress (due to androgynous looks) at the local tavern.
Edvard (エドヴァルト, Edovaruto)
Voiced by: Tetsu Inada (Japanese); Andrew Love (English)
A dragon-like servant of Echidna and member of the Elite Four. He is responsible for gathering the dragon race to Echidna's side. He is stupid and constantly fails at seppuku over the slightest mistake.
Dianette (ディアネット, Dianetto)
Voiced by: Minori Suzuki (Japanese); Brittney Karbowski (English)
A servant of Echidna and her forces.
Jerietta (ジェリエッタ)
Voiced by: Misato Matsuoka
The daughter of Edvard. She loves her father, but is exasperated with his personality.

== Media ==
=== Light novels ===
The series is written by Quantum and illustrated by Hana Amano. Originally serialized online on Kakuyomu from January 12 to February 7, 2017, Fujimi Shobo published the series in three printed volumes under their Kadokawa Books imprint from December 10, 2017, to October 10, 2018. The three volumes were later reprinted by the Fujimi Fantasia Bunko imprint from February 19 to April 20, 2022. An English digital release is being published by Kadokawa on its BookWalker website.

No.	Japanese release date	Japanese ISBN
1	December 10, 2017 (Kadokawa Books); February 19, 2022 (Fujimi Fantasia Bunko)	978-4-04-072540-6 (Kadokawa Books); 978-4-04-074284-7 (Fujimi Fantasia Bunko)
2	May 10, 2018 (Kadokawa Books); March 19, 2022 (Fujimi Fantasia Bunko)	978-4-04-072717-2 (Kadokawa Books); 978-4-04-074485-8 (Fujimi Fantasia Bunko)
3	October 10, 2018 (Kadokawa Books); April 20, 2022 (Fujimi Fantasia Bunko)	978-4-04-072926-8 (Kadokawa Books); 978-4-04-074486-5 (Fujimi Fantasia Bunko)

=== Manga ===
A manga adaptation with art by Nori Kazato began serialization on Kadokawa Shoten's Young Ace Up website on May 31, 2018. It ended serialization on June 2, 2023. Eight tankōbon volumes have been released as of July 2023. The manga is published in English digitally by Kadokawa on its BookWalker website, and in print by Yen Press.

No.	Original release date	Original ISBN	English release date	English ISBN
1	October 4, 2018	978-4-04-107616-3	January 17, 2023	978-1-97-536181-5
2	March 4, 2019	978-4-04-108015-3	April 18, 2023	978-1-97-536457-1
3	November 2, 2019	978-4-04-108595-0	August 29, 2023	978-1-97-536459-5
4	August 4, 2020	978-4-04-109345-0	December 12, 2023	978-1-97-536461-8
5	May 10, 2021	978-4-04-109346-7	March 19, 2024	978-1-97-536463-2
6	April 4, 2022	978-4-04-111921-1	July 23, 2024	978-1-97-536465-6
7	October 7, 2022	978-4-04-112959-3	November 19, 2024	978-1-97-537225-5
8	July 10, 2023	978-4-04-113621-8	April 22, 2025	978-1-97-539464-6

=== Anime ===
An anime television series adaptation was announced on October 20, 2021. The series is animated by EMT Squared and directed by Hisashi Ishii, with Yuu Nobuta serving as chief director, Shigeru Murakoshi overseeing the series' scripts, Yuki Nakano designing the characters, and Kōhei Munemoto composing the music. It aired from April 5 to June 21, 2022, on AT-X, Tokyo MX, BS11, and MBS. The opening theme song is "Broken Identity" by Minori Suzuki, while the ending theme song is "Growing" by Nao Tōyama. Sentai Filmworks has licensed the series outside of Asia. Medialink has licensed the series in Southeast Asia, South Asia, and Oceania minus Australia and New Zealand. A two-part original video animation was released with the series' Blu-ray/DVD volumes on June 24 and August 24, 2022.

==== Episode list ====
No.	Title	Directed by (Note: Information is taken from the ending credits of each episode.)	Written by	Storyboarded by	Original release date
1	"My Next Interview's at the Demon Queen's Palace!"; Transliteration: "Tsugi no Shokuba wa Maōjō" (Japanese: 次の職場は魔王城)	Hisashi Ishii	Shigeru Murakoshi	Hisashi Ishii	April 5, 2022
The world's strongest hero, Leo Demonheart, defeats the demon queen Echidna and her generals, the Elite Four, but later offers his services to Echidna to help rebuild her army, but is violently rejected by Echidna. Of the Elite Four, Dragon General Edvard and Shadowless General Mernes respect Leo for his warrior abilities. Beast General Lili was knocked out by Leo and by her species traditions, she considers him her future husband. Sorcerer General Shutina respects him for defeating her in a magic duel. Considering this, they decide to interview Leo. He reveals that after defeating Echidna, a rumor spread among humans that he was planning to become the next Demon King. Forced by his own terrified citizens, the King reluctantly exiled Leo. Disillusioned with humans, Leo lived aimlessly for a while until he heard Echidna was trying to recruit soldiers to her defeated army and decided to join her instead. The Four decide to hire Leo to handle the entire rebuilding of the army without Echidna's knowledge. If he produces good results, they will try to convince Echidna to officially hire him, otherwise he will be thrown out again. Leo hopes to one day speak to Echidna and learn why in the midst of the war did she prevent her soldiers from killing humans unnecessarily and potentially cause her own defeat.
2	"Strive to Ease the Burden on Your Future Self!"; Transliteration: "Asu no Jibun ga Raku ni Naru Shigoto o Shiro" (Japanese: 明日の自分が楽になる仕事をしろ)	Atsushi Nigorikawa	Shigeru Murakoshi	Atsushi Nigorikawa	April 12, 2022
Leo realizes most of the army's problems were caused by their leaders returning to the Demon World to recover from injuries given to them by Leo during the war, leaving only Shutina who knows how to run an army and she is exhausted. After waking up Shutina by pretending to be Echidna, to her annoyance, Leo decides to take over replenishing the mana reactor that powers the castle's magic items, a task that usually only Shutina could perform due to the wavelength of her magic. Leo teasingly demands a kiss if he performs well. Along the way, he sees the young servant woman Dianette. Leo annoys Shutina by taking an unusually long break and she threatens to fire him. At that moment, Dianette appears having replenished the reactors. Leo explains he crafted a talisman tuned to Shutina's magic wavelength, allowing anyone with mana to replenish the reactors and removing the burden from Shutina. Shutina realizes Dianette, along with other servants, are all worried about her and want to help. Shutina is forced to admit that Leo solved one of her problems. Leo returns to work, but first tries to claim his promised kiss, only to be told to leave by the embarrassed Shutina. With food and equipment stores running low, Leo has to ensure the next shipment arrives safely. He is worried that Lili submitted a guard mission proposal that simply instructs everyone to have fun together.
3	"A Little Bit of Thought Goes A Long Way for Efficiency!"; Transliteration: "Chotto Shita Kizuki ga Shigoto no Kōritsu o Ageru" (Japanese: ちょっとした気付きが仕事の効率をあげる)	Yūki Kusakabe	Hiroko Fukuda	Hatsuki Tsuji	April 19, 2022
The Dragon-folk who reside in the Largo Sea provide the Demon Army with food and other resources. Lili is too childish to ensure safe supply lines, so Leo is sent and finds nothing is organized properly and a single supply mission takes over a week. Realizing that Lili wants to do well and is held back by her immaturity, Leo fakes a snake bite and sends Lili into the mountains for healing herbs. By setting problems that require her to think logically and use her workers effectively, he hopes to force a more mature way of thinking on her. Unfortunately, when Lili transforms into her guardian form Fenrir, she is able to bypass the problems with stubborn strength. In disguise, Leo attempts to give her logistical hints. His plan is a failure as Lili gets the herbs anyway. He is surprised when Lili actually learns from the experience as it turns out she just needed to be bluntly told the right way to do things. Leo realizes he underestimated her intelligence. Shutina is pleased at Lili's progress. In order to hide his identity from Echidna, Leo has been disguising himself at work as Black Knight Onyx, but his achievements have come to the attention of Echidna who demands a meeting with Black Knight Onyx immediately.
4	"The Drinking Party from Hell"; Transliteration: "Jigoku no Nomikai" (Japanese: 地獄の飲み会)	Jun'ichi Kitamura	Akira Kindaichi	Hisashi Ishii	April 26, 2022
Leo meets Echidna and finds she has planned a dinner to reward his work. Forced to remove his helmet, he alters his face with magic. Shutina hopes Leo and Echidna don't become close. Leo asks why she rejected Hero Leo from her army and is met with a furious response that Leo unwittingly prevented her capturing the Philosopher's Stone from Renailles City. Leo had not known Echidna wanted the stone as he knows its powers are greatly exaggerated through rumor. Echidna reveals the Demon World is a polluted wasteland where everyone fights over resources, so she wants the stone to make the land fertile so the fighting can stop. Thus she was forced to battle humanity as she knows they would never just hand over a holy relic. She also reveals while she hates Leo for stopping her, she respects him for doing his job to protect humanity. Leo realizes Echidna is a kind person forced to battle humanity to obtain the stone and finds he wants to help her. Echidna asks why he, a human, joined her army, and he almost tells her the truth about being Leo, but they are interrupted by Shutina and Lili. Mernes has left to go on a journey and Edward is accepting blame for losing the war and plans to take his own life.
5	"If You Want to Quit, Talk It Out First"; Transliteration: "Shigoto o Yametaku Nattara Ichido Sōdan Shiro" (Japanese: 仕事を辞めたくなったら一度相談しろ)	Yasunori Gotō	Shigeru Murakoshi	Kagetsu Aizawa	May 3, 2022
Echidna goes to talk to Edward while Leo tracks down Mernes. Finding him, Mernes admits he is scared in three days he will have to start interviewing applicants for positions in the army, but he has terrible communication skills and so task Leo teach him how to communicate with others. With Mernes returned to the castle, Echidna is not surprised he was under so much stress, given Mernes was a supporter of totally eliminating humans and now has to work with them. Edward truly had tried to kill himself, but his impenetrable dragon skin kept saving him, so he is now being watched at all times by his daughter Julietta. Leo forces Mernes to masquerade as a waitress in the soldier's food hall, forcing him to converse with all kinds of people while also revealing he too was useless at talking to people while he was learning to be the hero, but he learned through practice and experience. Mernes practices on a group of ill-behaved werewolf mercenaries. When they turn lecherous, he is forced to discipline them, almost revealing his identity. Nevertheless, Mernes learns the basics in the arts of conversation. During a practice interview to hone his skills, Mernes asks Leo why he really joined their army when his desire to see humanity destroyed is a blatant lie.
6	"The Hero Shares His Tale of Burden"; Transliteration: "Yūsha, Naganen no Nayami o Kiite Morau" (Japanese: 勇者、長年の悩みを聞いてもらう)	Toshiyuki Sone	Hiroko Fukuda	Jun'ichi Kitamura	May 10, 2022
Mernes explains he is half-demon/half-human and was sold into childhood slavery. Seeing Echidna's war he volunteered to join, but was disappointed she spared more humans than she killed. Mernes briefly considered assassinating Echidna to lead the army himself, but resigned himself to being a general until he was defeated by Leo, who told him to experience the world, not as an assassin, but for fun. Leo decides to reveal his biggest secret. Leo is much older than anyone realizes, over 1000 years, and was born in modern Tokyo where magic didn't exist yet. Demons invaded from the Demon World so human scientists created 12 living weapons called Demonhart's, including Leo. The other Demonharts all died in battle while Leo was made more durable and still appears as a young man even after the modern world was left behind and society became what it is today. Leo was tired of fighting and of being unable to die. So when humanity rejected him he was filled with joy as he could finally have fun and since joining the demon army seemed like the most exciting thing to do, that's what he did. Since meeting Echidna and the generals, he genuinely likes them and wants to help them. Leo also points out Mernes is already a good communicator because he knows how to listen and his responses are always honest, so he will do just fine running the interviews.
7	"A Good Warrior Isn't Always A Good Boss"; Transliteration: "Yoi Senshi ga Yoi Jōshi ni Naru to wa Kagiranai" (Japanese: 良い戦士が良い上司になるとは限らない)	Akira Shimizu	Akira Kindaichi	Shin'ichi Watanabe	May 17, 2022
Leo learns from Julietta that Edvard can't understand why his soldiers keep losing. Leo deduces that because Edvard is a naturally-gifted warrior, he can't understand others are not as gifted, so he assumes he just didn't train them hard enough. This assumption has gotten worse since he lost to Leo as he now trains his soldiers to such extremes that they pass out. Leo promises to Julietta and Echidna that he will help Edvard. Mernes informs Shutina and Lili about Leo's past but they decide to continue trusting him. Several relics from the Age of Technology are discovered, Machine Golems called Phantom Nines as strong as high-ranked demons which Leo decides to use to help Edvard. He sets the Phantom to attack Edvard, realizing too late that its safety restrictions have malfunctioned, forcing him to step in and tell Edvard how to defeat it. Sensing its own defeat, the Phantom Nine remotely activates the other Phantom Nines to provide assistance. Regardless, they are destroyed by Echidna. Having required Leo's assistance against an enemy he didn't understand, Edvard realizes that he can't judge his soldiers against his standards and had been training them all wrong. So he apologizes to them and is forgiven. Echidna has too much fun destroying the Phantoms with Mernes suspecting it is her form of stress relief.
8	"Tokyo, 2060 A.D."; Transliteration: "Ē Dī Nisenrokujū Tōkyō Bōsho nite" (Japanese: A.D.2060東京某所にて)	Harume Kosaka	Shigeru Murakoshi	Yū Nobuta	May 24, 2022
As Black Knight Onyx, Leo is to be promoted by Echidna. He plans to reveal his identity to Echidna with Shutina's help. Leo reads a book about Eibrad, a famous demon known as the Joiner of Hands, which is also one of Echidna's favourite books. Leo is amused as he actually knew Eibrad in Tokyo. Back in 2060 Eibrad was an Imp demon who came to Earth for a better life, but misunderstandings between humans and demons started the war. When Leo heard Eibrad was preaching co-existence, trying to stop the fighting, he sought him out. It was Eibrad who first told Leo that, since he was designed to fight demons, he would have no purpose once the war ended but due to his immortality he would live unneeded and completely alone. Leo had never considered this before. Eibrad was imprisoned but swore to continue preaching coexistence until the war ended and made Leo promise to find a way to enjoy living once he no longer had to fight. Leo never saw him again but always remembered what Eibrad told him and now humans finally no longer want him he has found a way to enjoy living.
9	"I Want to Quit Heroing"; Transliteration: "Yūsha, Yametai" (Japanese: 勇者、辞めたい)	Yūji Kanzaki	Hiroko Fukuda	Hatsuki Tsuji	May 31, 2022
The portal to the Demon World begins to collapse forcing Echidna to consider returning to the Demon World immediately. Leo reveals the Philosopher's Stone is a modern engine that uses a black hole to produce unlimited energy and cannot be used to make the Demon World fertile again. He also reveals there are two on Earth. So to avoid war, Echidna need only locate the second one. Having learnt he is Leo, Echidna eventually calms down after the four Generals explain everything. Leo leads them to the second Stone in the mountains and explains that the engine requires a user guide. Echidna plans to make peace with humanity so they can search for a guide together and activate both engines; one for humanity and one for the Demon World. Echidna and Leo argue constantly which ends in a snowball fight, to the General's relief. Leo privately reveals to Echidna that due to his in-built purpose to protect humanity, he might go insane and cause war after war just so he can save humanity over and over again. Leo suddenly reveals the engines are actually the power sources of the Demonharts. He thus challenges Echidna and the Four Generals to prove their resolve. All they must do is defeat him in battle, remove his heart, and use it to make peace with humanity and rejuvenate the Demon World. If they fail, the Demon World will remain a wasteland and he will personally destroy humanity.
10	"I'll Save the World, Even If That Means Destroying It"; Transliteration: "Sekai o Horoboshite de mo, Sekai o Sukuō" (Japanese: 世界を滅ぼしてでも、世界を救おう)	Hisashi Ishii	Akira Kindaichi	Hisashi Ishii	June 7, 2022
Attacking Echidna, Leo claims that since war gives his existence meaning, he will save humanity even if he is the threat they need saving from. Edvard is injured protecting Shutina. Leo is tired of protecting humanity and wants to die, but his immortality prevents it. So he will destroy everything so there is nothing for him to protect. Lili tries to reason with him, but he attacks her despite her being unarmed. Realizing he truly means to kill them, they begin fighting to kill him too. Edvard is defeated and Echidna realizes with his ability "Hyper-reactive Skill Improvement", he can copy and improve any style of attack and defense. So after thousands of years of fighting, he is impervious to all damage. Mernes accuses him of lying about wanting to either die or destroy the world as it contradicts his attempts to help achieve peace. Leo freezes Mernes in ice. Lili unwillingly fights him in her Fenrir form, but is defeated. Believing she knows Leo's true motivations, Echidna decides to use an ultimate spell she inherited from her father Cychreus, specifically designed to defeat a Hero by disabling all their abilities for a single moment. Shutina distracts Leo for long enough, but is defeated right before Leo is hit by the spell titled Hero Binding: Anti-Leo.
11	"What Makes a Hero"; Transliteration: "Yūsha no Shikaku" (Japanese: 勇者の資格)	Yasunori Gotō	Shigeru Murakoshi	Kagetsu Aizawa	June 14, 2022
Right before the spell hits, Leo thanks Echidna. Leo sees his entire life flash before his eyes, from the time of his creation through endless series of war followed by times of peace. As thousands of years passed, he realised he hated the idea of peace and wanted the world to be continuously in danger. One day, he had the idea that he could be the one to threaten humanity and so he began creating a new Demon Heart series that would destroy the world rather than protect it. When the Demon World invaded, he destroyed his unfinished creations as he realized he had gone insane. To protect humanity, he had to die, but he also had to leave his Philosopher Stone heart to someone worthy of it. That was when he first met Echidna and realized she was the successor he needed. So he first defeated her, then joined her army to learn more about her and now has chosen her to assist him with committing suicide. Echidna sees the happiness in his eyes and realizes all along he wanted someone to save him. Deciding to give him a death worthy of a Hero, Echidna keeps him powerless allowing the Four Generals to finally kill him.
12	"I'm Quitting Heroing"; Transliteration: "Yūsha, Yamemasu" (Japanese: 勇者、辞めます)	Harume Kosaka	Shigeru Murakoshi	Hisashi Ishii	June 21, 2022
As Leo lies dying, he disables his internal security giving them 300 seconds to remove his philosopher's stone. Echidna asks if he has any regrets, but he merely apologizes for causing trouble. Echidna almost removes the stone only to suddenly change her mind and announces Leo has passed his probation and is hired as her ambassador to the human world in charge of peace between demons and humans. Leo begs to die, so Shutina demands to know his real motive. He admits by even contemplating destroying humanity, he has dangerously evolved beyond the orders his creators programmed him with. By that logic, Shutina tells him to evolve the ability to ignore the programming. Doubtful, Leo attempts to do so and is successful in deleting the order to protect humanity that has driven him mad for 3000 years. As time runs out, Leo seals the stone inside him forever and he happily agrees to Echidna's request. Echidna later asks if he regrets losing what might have been his one chance to die. He denies it as he is happy to be helping Echidna. They are suddenly interrupted by Julietta who at first thinks they are having a romantic moment which Echidna violently, yet embarrassingly, denies. Julietta reveals while they were gone, a mountain of work has piled up requiring their attention. Leo begins working as he is glad that he was finally able to quit heroing.
OVA–1	"Remember, The Work Trip Is First And Foremost A Learning Opportunity, Part 1"; Transliteration: "Oboete oite kudasai, shutchō wa naniyori mo mazu gakushū no kikaidesu, pāto 1" (Japanese: 覚えておいてください、出張は何よりもまず学習の機会です、パート 1)	Hisashi Ishii	Shigeru Murakoshi	Hisashi Ishii	June 24, 2022
One month after Echidna officially hires Leo everyone goes on a trip to lie low for a while. The innkeeper welcomes them but warns the inn is haunted and gives them charms to keep ghosts away, animal ear headbands that Leo finds hilarious. Echidna however takes the charms seriously and insists everyone wear them. Echidna goes shopping for snacks but disappears, as does Mernes when he goes to look for her. Leo discovers a painting in their room with moving eyes, making everyone nervous. Edvard goes to look for Echidna but is heard screaming before also disappearing. An invisible spirit attacks the room, flinging objects around randomly, causing them to discover a Mechanical Age relic, a rotary telephone. Shutina and Leo both realise their magic has stopped working and Shutina panics that ghosts might be real and invincible. Echidna reappears, claiming the staff members have disappeared. Lili also disappears and Echidna demands they be found.
OVA–2	"Remember, The Work Trip Is First And Foremost A Learning Opportunity, Part 2"; Transliteration: "Oboete oite kudasai, shutchō wa naniyori mo mazu gakushū no kikaidesu, pāto 2" (Japanese: 覚えておいてください、出張は何よりもまず学習の機会です、パート 2)	Hisashi Ishii	Shigeru Murakoshi	Hisashi Ishii	August 24, 2022
After a long search they are forced to conclude their missing friends are no longer inside the inn, so they decide to search outside. Leo notices he has a headache but Echidna convinces him the headband is simply too tight. Shutina is suddenly pulled away into the dark and disappears. Echidna is revealed to be possessed before also disappearing. Leo chases the ghost into the forest but it is revealed to be Mernes who reveals the entire thing was a prank staged by Echidna since the innkeepers offer a "Haunted Prank" as an optional extra for visitors. Sharing a hot spring together Echidna reveals how the prank worked and that the experience has made everyone closer as friends. After the hot spring they set off fireworks at the beach to celebrate. Leo admits he is enjoying visiting new places for fun as most of his life has been spent travelling from one battlefield to the next, and he hopes to do it again soon.
