= I'm Kodama Kawashiri =

Japanese manga series

- Cover of I'm Kodama Kawashiri volume 1 by Kadokawa Shoten

あたしゃ川尻こだまだよ〜デンジャラスライフハッカーのただれた生活〜 (Atasha Kawashiri Kodama da yo～Denjarasu Raifu Hakkā no Tadareta Seikatsu～)
- Genre: Slice of life
- Manga
- Written by: Kodama Kawashiri
- Published by: Kadokawa Shoten
- Original run: September 9, 2020 – present
- Volumes: 3
- Anime television series
- Directed by: Shingo Kaneko
- Music by: yuma yamaguchi
- Studio: Lapin Track
- Licensed by: Crunchyroll
- Original network: Fuji TV, mit
- Original run: January 14, 2022 – August 12, 2022
- Episodes: 24
- Television drama
- Directed by: Yūichi Fukuda
- Written by: Yūichi Fukuda
- Licensed by: Hulu
- English network: NTV
- Original run: January 11, 2027 – scheduled
- Episodes: 25

I'm Kodama Kawashiri (Japanese: あたしゃ川尻こだまだよ～デンジャラスライフハッカーのただれた生活～, Hepburn: Atasha Kawashiri Kodama da yo～Denjarasu Raifu Hakkā no Tadareta Seikatsu～; "It's Me, Kawashiri Kodama -The Dissolute Life of a Dangerous Lifehacker-") is a Japanese manga series by Kodama Kawashiri. It has been serialized online via Twitter since September 2020 and has been collected in three tankōbon volumes by Kadokawa Shoten. An anime television series adaptation by Lapin Track aired from January to August 2022. A live-action television drama is set to premiere in January 2027.

== Characters ==
Kodama Kawashiri (川尻こだま, Kawashiri Kodama)
Voiced by: Aoi Yūki
Portrayed by: Kanna Hashimoto

== Media ==
=== Manga ===
No.	Japanese release date	Japanese ISBN
1	November 5, 2021	978-4-04-680828-8
2	August 8, 2022	978-4-04-681498-2 (regular edition); 978-4-04-681499-9 (special edition)
3	January 4, 2024	978-4-04-683084-5

=== Anime ===
An anime television series adaptation by Lapin Track was announced on September 9, 2021. The series is directed by Shingo Kaneko, with Yayoi Takano designing the characters and Yuma Yamaguchi composing the music. It aired from January 14 to August 12, 2022, within the EXITV~FOD no Shinsaku Meisaku wo Pon! Pon! Misemakuri!!~ variety program on Fuji TV and on the Japanese streaming service Fuji TV on Demand. The series ran for 24 episodes. Crunchyroll licensed the series.

==== Episode list ====
No.	Title	Original release date (Note: Episodes 1 to 12 were released on January 14, 2022 on the Japanese streaming service Fuji TV on Demand.)
1	"It's Me, Kawashiri Kodama"; Transliteration: "Atasha Kawashiri Kodama da yo" (Japanese: あたしゃ川尻こだまだよ)	January 14, 2022
2	"My Dissolute Life"; Transliteration: "Tadareta Seikatsu" (Japanese: ただれた生活)	January 21, 2022
3	"About Inageya"; Transliteration: "Inageya no Hanashi" (Japanese: いなげやの話)	January 28, 2022
4	"Roasted Pork Ramen Diet"; Transliteration: "Chāshūmen Daietto" (Japanese: チャーシュー麺ダイエット)	February 4, 2022
5	"Local Chinese Restaurant"; Transliteration: "Machi Chūka" (Japanese: 町中華)	February 11, 2022
6	"Valentine's Day"; Transliteration: "Barentain Dē" (Japanese: バレンタインデー)	February 18, 2022
7	"Coffee"; Transliteration: "Kōhī" (Japanese: コーヒー)	February 25, 2022
8	"Life with Karaage"; Transliteration: "Karaage ga Aru Seikatsu" (Japanese: からあげがある生活)	March 4, 2022
9	"Strategic Retreat"; Transliteration: "Senryakuteki Tettai" (Japanese: 戦略的撤退)	March 11, 2022
10	"Ogabab Day"; Transliteration: "Ogyababu Hi" (Japanese: オギャバブ日)	April 8, 2022
11	"Multitask Technique"; Transliteration: "Maruchitasuku Jutsu" (Japanese: マルチタスク術)	April 15, 2022
12	"How to Eat Packed Sushi"; Transliteration: "Pakku Sushi no Tabekata" (Japanese: パック寿司の食べ方)	April 22, 2022

=== Drama ===
A live-action television drama was announced on November 6, 2026. The 25-episode series will be directed and written by Yūichi Fukuda, and is set to premiere on Hulu and NTV's morning television show ZIP! on January 11, 2027.

== Reception ==
In 2021, the manga was nominated for the Next Manga Awards in the digital category, and was ranked 11th out of 50 nominees.
