= DLE (company) =

Japanese animation studio

DLE Inc.
- Native name: 株式会社ディー・エル・イー
- Romanized name: Kabushikigaisha Dī Eru Ī
- Type: Publicly listed subsidiary KK
- Traded as: TYO: 3686
- Industry: Japanese animation Flash animation
- Founded: December 27, 2001; 24 years ago
- Headquarters: Chiyoda-ku, Tokyo, Japan
- Key people: Ryuuta Shiki, Ryo Ono
- Parent: Asahi Broadcasting Group Holdings Corporation (51.96%) (2019–present)
- Website: www.dle.jp

DLE Inc. (株式会社ディー・エル・イー, Kabushikigaisha Dī Eru Ī) (Dream Link Entertainment) is a Tokyo-based animation and entertainment company founded in 2001 by former Sony executive producer Ryuta Shiiki. DLE has gained notoriety in Japan for their flagship animated television and film series Eagle Talon, a surreal sitcom created entirely in Flash animation by Frogman (a.k.a. Ryo Ono). DLE has now produced over 30 properties and has business and creative partners in Shanghai, United Arab Emirates, Thailand, Singapore, India and North America where Hasbro is a stakeholder.

On May 11, 2019, it was announced by the studio that Asahi Broadcasting Corporation acquired 51.96% of their shares for 2.772 billion yen (about US$25.21 million) which made them a subsidiary of the company.

== History ==
Dream Link Entertainment was established on December 27, 2001.

In 2015, DLE acquired the license to the fashion show, Tokyo Girls Collection. The first TGC show under DLE's management was held in September 2015. On September 1, 2016, DLE fully acquired W-Media, the original owners of Tokyo Girls Collection, in a full M&A.

On October 6, 2016, DLE partnered with Toho Cinemas to start Japan's first "eSports in cinema" tournament event called Gamers Battle Club. The event was held in Roppongi Hills' Toho Cinemas, and featured comedians and Japanese idols as participants. The second Gamers Battle Club was held on February 4, 2017.

=== Tokyo Girls Collection ===
In June 2015, DLE purchased the license to Tokyo Girls Collection, the largest fashion show/event within Japan from the event's owner company, Branding, Inc. The first TGC produced by DLE was held on September 27, 2015.

== Works ==
DLE began as a Flash Animation anime company, but has since ventured into the live-action, music, and events businesses.

=== Anime ===
==== Television ====
- Eagle Talon
  - The Frogman Show (2006)
  - Eagle Talon The Countdown (2009)
  - Eagle Talon Neo (2012)
  - Eagle Talon Max (2013)
  - Eagle Talon EX (2014)
  - Eagle Talon DO (2015)
- Rocket Girls (2007, as Mook DLE)
- Haiyoru! Nyaruani (2009)
  - Haiyoru! Nyaruani: Remember My Mr. Lovecraft (2010)
- Yuruani? (2011)
  - Double-J
- High Score (2011)
- Thermae Romae (2012)
- Lupin Shanshei (2012)
- Q-Transformers: Mystery of Convoy Returns (2015)
  - Q-Transformers 2: The Road to Additional Popularity (2015)
- Panpaka Pantsu
  - Panpaka Pants Oh New! (2015)
  - Panpaka Pants W Oh New! (2016)
  - Panpaka Pants Season 3 (2016 South Korea, 2017 Japan)
- Yasamura Yasashi no Yasashii Sekai (2016)
- Yuri's World (2017)
- Shichinin no Ayakashi (2016)
- Okko's Inn (2018, with Madhouse)
- Skull-face Bookseller Honda-san (2018)
- Taeko no Nichijō (2019)
- Squishy! Black Clover (2019)
- Doomsday With My Dog (2022)
- The Human Crazy University (2022)
- Fate/Grand Order: Fujimaru Ritsuka Doesn't Get It (2023)
- Nohara Hiroshi Hirumeshi no Ryūgi (2025)
- Shō 3 Ashibe QQ Goma-chan (2026)
- Yoshimaho: Yoshi Yoshi Magic (TBA)

==== Film ====
- Eagle Talon
  - Eagle Talon The Movie: The Chancellor Only Lives Twice! (2007) Won the Best Animation Award at the New York International Independent Film and Video Festival in 2008.
  - Eagle Talon The Movie 2: The Black Tea That Loved Me (2008)
  - Eagle Talon The Movie 3: Long Live http://EagleTalon.jp (2010)
  - DC Superheroes vs. Eagle Talon (2017, co-production with DC Entertainment, Warner Bros. Pictures, Shirogumi and Gonzo)
- Panpaka Pants
  - Panpaka Pants The Movie: Treasure of the Bananan Kingdom (2015)
  - Crayon Shin-chan x Panpaka Pants: Aeon Cinema Manner Movie Collab (2017, with Shin-Ei Animation)

=== Live-Action ===
- Sabuibo Mask (2015)
- Chinyuki (2015)
- Mitsuno Aware (2016)
- Joshi ko (2016)
- Destruction Babies (2016) – Won the "Prize for the best emerging director" at the Locarno Film Festival for director Mariko Tetsuya.
- Lyrical School: Michi to no Souguu
- Koto (2016)
- Hara Hara Nanoka (2017)

== Scandals ==
DLE has been accused of manipulating financial accounts.
