= 7th Crunchyroll Anime Awards =

2023 award ceremony

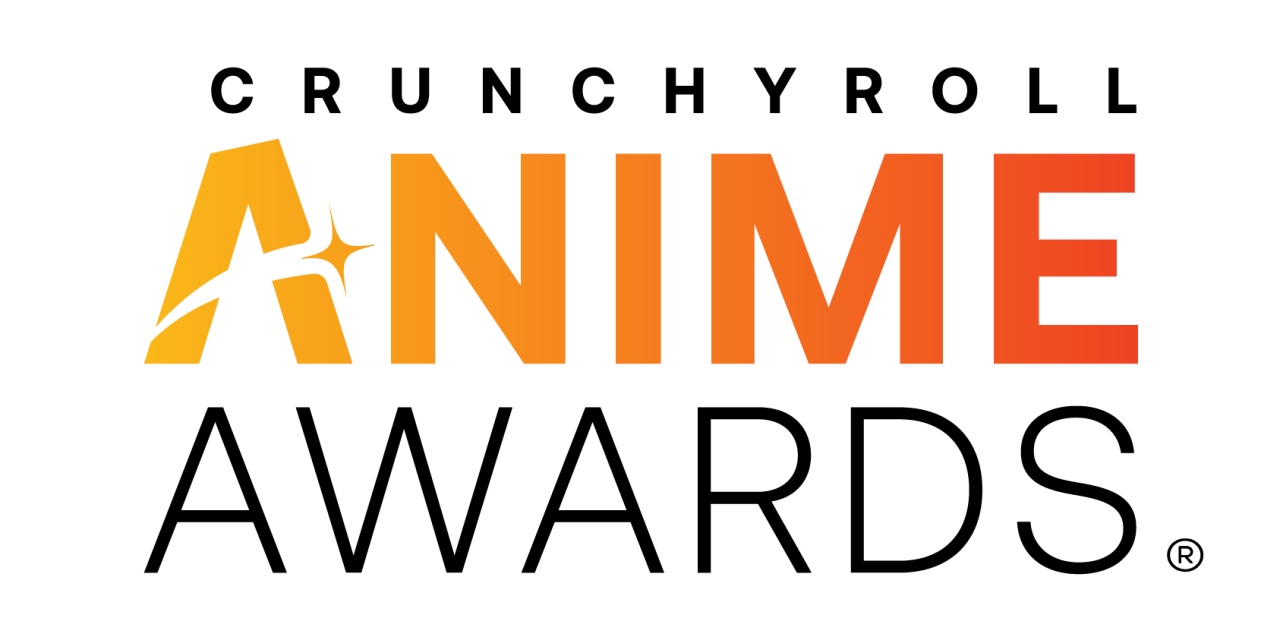
- Awarded for: Excellence in anime
- Date: March 4, 2023
- Location: Grand Prince Hotel New Takanawa, Tokyo, Japan
- Country: United States
- Hosted by: Sally Amaki; Jon Kabira

Highlights
- Most wins: Attack on Titan: The Final Season Part 2, Demon Slayer: Kimetsu no Yaiba Entertainment District Arc, and Spy × Family (6)
- Most nominations: Spy × Family (19)
- Anime of the Year: Cyberpunk: Edgerunners
- Best Film: Jujutsu Kaisen 0
- Website: Crunchyroll Anime Awards

The 7th Crunchyroll Anime Awards was held on March 4, 2023, at the Main Banquet Hall of the Grand Prince Hotel New Takanawa in Tokyo, Japan. This edition was the first ceremony to be held in person since 2020; both ceremonies in 2021 and 2022 were held virtually. Additionally, it was the first ceremony to be held in Japan, as previous physical ceremonies were held in the United States. This edition featured 31 categories honoring anime released from November 2021 to September 2022. The ceremony was hosted by voice actress Sally Amaki and presenter Jon Kabira. Crunchyroll streamed the ceremony live on YouTube and Twitch, as well as on SonyLIV in India. Crunchyroll also reported that 18 million votes from 200 countries and territories were submitted.

== Winners and nominees ==
Categories for the 7th edition was announced on December 8, 2022. Nominees were announced on January 19, 2023. Spy × Family garnered the most nominations with 19, followed by Ranking of Kings (17 nominations) and Cyberpunk: Edgerunners (13 nominations). The three anime series were nominated for Anime of the Year, together with Attack on Titan: The Final Season Part 2, Demon Slayer: Kimetsu no Yaiba Entertainment District Arc, and Lycoris Recoil. All Anime of the Year nominees, except Lycoris Recoil, were also nominated on the Best Animation category, together with Akebi's Sailor Uniform. Commercially successful films Dragon Ball Super: Super Hero and Jujutsu Kaisen 0 were nominated in the Best Film category, together with Bubble, The Deer King, and Annie Awards nominee Inu-Oh. One Piece was nominated for Best Continuing Series, together with Attack on Titan: The Final Season Part 2, Demon Slayer: Kimetsu no Yaiba Entertainment District Arc, JoJo's Bizarre Adventure: Stone Ocean, Kaguya-sama: Love Is War – Ultra Romantic, and Made in Abyss: The Golden City of the Scorching Sun. Hiroyuki Sawano, Kohta Yamamoto, Yuki Kajiura, and Go Shiina were nominated again for Best Score; Sawano received his fourth nomination for the award. Yuki Kaji was also nominated again for Best VA Performance (Japanese) for Eren Jaeger.

Among genre categories, Attack on Titan and Demon Slayer: Kimetsu no Yaiba were nominated again for Best Action. 86 was also nominated again for Best Drama, while Kaguya-sama: Love Is War receiving the third nomination for Best Comedy; Kotaro Lives Alone also received nominations for both categories. Mushoku Tensei: Jobless Reincarnation and Ranking of Kings were nominated again for Best Fantasy, while Komi Can't Communicate also nominated again in Best Romance. For character categories, Eren Jaeger from Attack on Titan was nominated for Best Main Character along with Bojji from Ranking of Kings, while Anya Forger from Spy × Family was nominated for Best Supporting Character and "Must Protect at All Costs" Character. Two anime songs nominated for Best Opening Sequence and one for Best Ending Sequence, were nominated for Best Anime Song as well: "The Rumbling" by SiM, "Chikichiki Banban" by Queendom, and "Comedy" by Gen Hoshino. Both opening and ending themes for Attack on Titan and Spy × Family were nominated in their respective categories.

=== Awards ===
Cyberpunk: Edgerunners won Anime of the Year, becoming the first video game adaptation and prequel series to win, as well as Zach Aguilar who also won the Best VA Performance (English) award for his work as David Martinez. Demon Slayer: Kimetsu no Yaiba Entertainment District Arc, Attack on Titan: The Final Season Part 2, and Spy × Family are tied for the most wins with six. The film Jujutsu Kaisen 0 won three awards, including the Best Film category. Eren Jaeger from Attack on Titan won Best Main Character, while Anya Forger from Spy × Family won Best Supporting Character and "Must Protect at All Costs" Character. Haruo Sotozaki, director of Demon Slayer: Kimetsu no Yaiba Entertainment District Arc, won Best Director. "The Rumbling" won Best Opening Sequence and Best Anime Song, while "Comedy" won Best Ending Sequence. Yuki Kaji won Best VA Performance (Japanese) for two consecutive years. Amal Hawija and Elisa Giorgio won the inaugural Best VA Performance for Arabic and Italian, respectively. Demon Slayer: Kimetsu no Yaiba Entertainment District Arc won Best Action and Best Fantasy, Spy × Family won Best Comedy, Attack on Titan: The Final Season Part 2 won Best Drama, and Kaguya-sama: Love Is War – Ultra Romantic won Best Romance.

Winners are listed first, highlighted in boldface, and indicated with a double dagger (‡). The lists are arranged alphabetically, except for the winner.

**Anime of the Year**: **Cyberpunk: Edgerunners — Studio Trigger and CD Projekt**‡; Attack on Titan: The Final Season Part 2 — MAPPA; Demon Slayer: Kimetsu no Yaiba Entertainment District Arc — Ufotable; Lycoris Recoil — A-1 Pictures; Ranking of Kings (cour 2) — Wit Studio; Spy × Family — Wit Studio and CloverWorks	**Best Film**: **Jujutsu Kaisen 0 — MAPPA**‡; Bubble — Wit Studio; Dragon Ball Super: Super Hero — Toei Animation; Inu-Oh — Science SARU; One Piece Film: Red — Toei Animation; The Deer King — Production I.G
**Best Continuing Series**: **One Piece — Toei Animation**‡; Attack on Titan: The Final Season Part 2 — MAPPA; Demon Slayer: Kimetsu no Yaiba Entertainment District Arc — Ufotable; JoJo's Bizarre Adventure: Stone Ocean — David Production; Kaguya-sama: Love Is War – Ultra Romantic — A-1 Pictures; Made in Abyss: The Golden City of the Scorching Sun — Kinema Citrus	**Best New Series**: **Spy × Family — Wit Studio and CloverWorks**‡; Call of the Night — Liden Films; Cyberpunk: Edgerunners — Studio Trigger and CD Projekt; Lycoris Recoil — A-1 Pictures; My Dress-Up Darling — CloverWorks; Ya Boy Kongming! — P.A. Works
**Best Original Anime**: **Lycoris Recoil — A-1 Pictures**‡; Birdie Wing: Golf Girls' Story — Bandai Namco Pictures; Healer Girl — 3Hz; The Orbital Children — Production +h; Vampire in the Garden — Wit Studio; Yurei Deco — Science SARU	**Best Animation**: **Demon Slayer: Kimetsu no Yaiba Entertainment District Arc — Ufotable**‡; Akebi's Sailor Uniform — CloverWorks; Attack on Titan: The Final Season Part 2 — MAPPA; Cyberpunk: Edgerunners — Studio Trigger and CD Projekt; Ranking of Kings (cour 2) — Wit Studio; Spy × Family — Wit Studio and CloverWorks
**Best Character Design**: **Akira Matsushima, original design by Koyoharu Gotouge — Demon Slayer: Kimetsu no Yaiba Entertainment District Arc**‡; Yoh Yoshinari — Cyberpunk: Edgerunners; Masanori Shino, original design by Hirohiko Araki — JoJo's Bizarre Adventure: Stone Ocean; Kazumasa Ishida, original design by Shinichi Fukuda — My Dress-Up Darling; Atsuko Nozaki, original design by Sōsuke Tōka — Ranking of Kings (cour 2); Kazuaki Shimada, original design by Tatsuya Endo — Spy × Family	**Best Director**: **Haruo Sotozaki — Demon Slayer: Kimetsu no Yaiba Entertainment District Arc**‡; Hiroyuki Imaishi — Cyberpunk: Edgerunners; Kazuhiro Furuhashi — Spy × Family; Shingo Adachi — Lycoris Recoil; Yōsuke Hatta — Ranking of Kings (cour 2); Yuichiro Hayashi — Attack on Titan: The Final Season Part 2
**Best Action**: **Demon Slayer: Kimetsu no Yaiba Entertainment District Arc — Ufotable**‡; Attack on Titan: The Final Season Part 2 — MAPPA; Cyberpunk: Edgerunners — Studio Trigger and CD Projekt; JoJo's Bizarre Adventure: Stone Ocean — David Production; Lycoris Recoil — A-1 Pictures; Spy × Family — Wit Studio and CloverWorks	**Best Comedy**: **Spy × Family — Wit Studio and CloverWorks**‡; Kaguya-sama: Love Is War – Ultra Romantic — A-1 Pictures; Kotaro Lives Alone — Liden Films; My Dress-Up Darling — CloverWorks; Uncle from Another World — Atelier Pontdarc; Ya Boy Kongming! — P.A. Works
**Best Drama**: **Attack on Titan: The Final Season Part 2 — MAPPA**‡; 86 — A-1 Pictures; Cyberpunk: Edgerunners — Studio Trigger and CD Projekt; Dance Dance Danseur — MAPPA; Kotaro Lives Alone — Liden Films; Made in Abyss: The Golden City of the Scorching Sun — Kinema Citrus	**Best Fantasy**: **Demon Slayer: Kimetsu no Yaiba Entertainment District Arc — Ufotable**‡; Made in Abyss: The Golden City of the Scorching Sun — Kinema Citrus; Mushoku Tensei: Jobless Reincarnation (cour 2) — Studio Bind; Overlord (season 4) — Madhouse; Ranking of Kings (cour 2) — Wit Studio; The Case Study of Vanitas (cour 2) — Bones
**Best Romance**: **Kaguya-sama: Love Is War – Ultra Romantic — A-1 Pictures**‡; Call of the Night — Liden Films; Komi Can't Communicate (season 2) — OLM; Love After World Domination — Project No.9; My Dress-Up Darling — CloverWorks; Shikimori's Not Just a Cutie — Doga Kobo	**Best Main Character**: **Eren Jaeger — Attack on Titan: The Final Season Part 2**‡; Bojji — Ranking of Kings (cour 2); Chisato Nishikigi — Lycoris Recoil; David Martinez — Cyberpunk: Edgerunners; Loid Forger — Spy × Family; Marin Kitagawa — My Dress-Up Darling
**Best Supporting Character**: **Anya Forger — Spy × Family**‡; Ai Hayasaka — Kaguya-sama: Love Is War – Ultra Romantic; Kage — Ranking of Kings; Rebecca — Cyberpunk: Edgerunners; Tengen Uzui — Demon Slayer: Kimetsu no Yaiba Entertainment District Arc; Yor Forger — Spy × Family	**"Must Protect at All Costs" Character**: **Anya Forger — Spy × Family**‡; Bojji — Ranking of Kings (cour 2); Kage — Ranking of Kings; Komi Shōko — Komi Can't Communicate (season 2); Kotaro Satō — Kotaro Lives Alone; Marin Kitagawa — My Dress-Up Darling
**Best Anime Song**: **"The Rumbling" by SiM — Attack on Titan: The Final Season Part 2**‡; "Chikichiki Banban" by Queendom — Ya Boy Kongming!; "Comedy" by Gen Hoshino — Spy × Family; "My Nonfiction" by Makoto Furukawa and Konomi Kohara — Kaguya-sama: Love Is War – Ultra Romantic; "New Genesis" by Ado — One Piece Film: Red; "Shall We Dance?" by Reona — Shadows House (season 2)	**Best Score**: **Hiroyuki Sawano and Kohta Yamamoto — Attack on Titan: The Final Season Part 2**‡; Akira Yamaoka — Cyberpunk: Edgerunners; Yuki Kajiura and Go Shiina — Demon Slayer: Kimetsu no Yaiba Entertainment District Arc; Kevin Penkin — Made in Abyss: The Golden City of the Scorching Sun; (K)now Name — Spy × Family; Genki Hikota — Ya Boy Kongming!
**Best Opening Sequence**: **"The Rumbling" by SiM, direction and storyboard by Takashi Kojima — Attack on Titan: The Final Season Part 2**‡; "Chikichiki Banban" by Queendom, direction and storyboard by 10GAUGE — Ya Boy Kongming!; "Mixed Nuts" by Official Hige Dandism, direction and storyboard by Masashi Ishihama — Spy × Family; "Hadaka no Yūsha" by Vaundy, direction and storyboard by Shingo Yamashita — Ranking of Kings (cour 2); "This Fffire" by Franz Ferdinand, direction by Hiroyuki Imaishi, storyboard by Kai Ikarashi — Cyberpunk: Edgerunners; "Zankyōsanka" by Aimer, direction by Akira Matsushima, storyboard by Haruo Sotozaki — Demon Slayer: Kimetsu no Yaiba Entertainment District Arc	**Best Ending Sequence**: **"Comedy" by Gen Hoshino, direction and storyboard by Atsushi Nishigori — Spy × Family**‡; "Akuma no Ko" by Ai Higuchi, direction and storyboard by Paraco Shinohara — Attack on Titan: The Final Season Part 2; "Heart wa Oteage" by Airi Suzuki, direction and storyboard by Nichika Ono — Kaguya-sama: Love Is War – Ultra Romantic; "Koi no Yukue" by Akari Akase, direction and storyboard by Futata — My Dress-Up Darling; "Koshaberi Biyori" by FantasticYouth, direction and storyboard by Kōki Fujimoto — Komi Can't Communicate (season 2); "Yofukashi no Uta" by Creepy Nuts, direction by Haruka Segawa, storyboard by Tomoyuki Itamura — Call of the Night
**Best VA Performance (Japanese)**: **Yuki Kaji as Eren Jaeger — Attack on Titan: The Final Season Part 2**‡; Atsumi Tanezaki as Anya Forger — Spy × Family; Chika Anzai as Chisato Nishikigi — Lycoris Recoil; Fairouz Ai as Jolyne Cujoh — JoJo's Bizarre Adventure: Stone Ocean; Misaki Kuno as Faputa — Made in Abyss: The Golden City of the Scorching Sun; Natsuki Hanae as Tanjiro Kamado — Demon Slayer: Kimetsu no Yaiba Entertainment District Arc	**Best VA Performance (English)**: **Zach Aguilar as David Martinez — Cyberpunk: Edgerunners**‡; Amanda Lee as Marin Kitagawa — My Dress-Up Darling; Cherami Leigh as Kotaro Satō — Kotaro Lives Alone; Natalie Van Sistine as Yor Forger — Spy × Family; SungWon Cho as Kage — Ranking of Kings; Zeno Robinson as Gamma 2 — Dragon Ball Super: Super Hero
**Best VA Performance (Arabic)**: **Amal Hawija as Gon Freecss — Hunter × Hunter**‡; Adel Abo Hassoon as Kage — Ranking of Kings; Amal Saadalden as Conan Edogawa — Detective Conan: The Bride of Halloween; Mohja AlSheak as Izuku "Deku" Midoriya — My Hero Academia (season 1); Naji Makhoul as Ichigo Kurosaki — Bleach (season 1); Ula Zidan as Marin Kitagawa — My Dress-Up Darling	**Best VA Performance (Castilian)**: **Jaime Pérez de Sevilla as Yuta Okkotsu — Jujutsu Kaisen 0**‡; Lourdes Fabrés as Jolyne Cujoh — JoJo's Bizarre Adventure: Stone Ocean; Alejandro Albaiceta as Gohan — Dragon Ball Super: Super Hero; Marc Gómez as Daida — Ranking of Kings (cour 1); Masumi Mutsuda as Yatora Yaguchi — Blue Period; Mónica Padrós as Hiling — Ranking of Kings (cour 1)
**Best VA Performance (French)**: **Brigitte Lecordier as Bojji — Ranking of Kings**‡; Alexis Tomassian as Kage — Ranking of Kings; Dorothée Pousséo as Lucy — Cyberpunk: Edgerunners; Geneviève Doang as Vladilena Milizé — 86; Laure Filiu as Jolyne Cujoh — JoJo's Bizarre Adventure: Stone Ocean; Martin Faliu as Miyuki Shirogane — Kaguya-sama: Love Is War – Ultra Romantic	**Best VA Performance (German)**: **Nicolás Artajo as Yuta Okkotsu — Jujutsu Kaisen 0**‡; Gabrielle Pietermann as Marin Kitagawa — My Dress-Up Darling; Jannik Endemann as Ritsuka Uenoyama — Given; Lara Trautmann as Belle — Belle; Torsten Michaelis as Askeladd — Vinland Saga (season 1); Uwe Thomsen as Jotaro Kujo — JoJo's Bizarre Adventure: Diamond Is Unbreakable
**Best VA Performance (Italian)**: **Elisa Giorgio as Maki Zen'in — Jujutsu Kaisen (cour 1)**‡; Andrea La Greca as Kyojuro Rengoku — Demon Slayer: Kimetsu no Yaiba Mugen Train Arc; Andrea Oldani as Daida — Ranking of Kings (cour 1); Deborah Morese as Marin Kitagawa — My Dress-Up Darling; Giulia Maniglio as Riku — Made in Abyss: The Golden City of the Scorching Sun; Simone Lupinacci as Shoyo Hinata — Haikyu!! To the Top (season 4)	**Best VA Performance (Portuguese)**: **Nina Carvalho as Anya Forger — Spy × Family**‡; Antônio Moreno as Heihachi Mishima — Tekken: Bloodline; Charles Emmanuel as Kazuya Kinoshita — Rent-A-Girlfriend (season 2); Mariana Dondi as Hayase Nagatoro — Don't Toy with Me, Miss Nagatoro; Pedro Alcântara as Yuta Okkotsu — Jujutsu Kaisen 0; Yan Gesteira as Ashito Aoi — Aoashi
**Best VA Performance (Spanish)**: **Alejandro Orozco as Gyutaro — Demon Slayer: Kimetsu no Yaiba Entertainment District Arc**‡; Diana Castañeda as Chisato Nishikigi — Lycoris Recoil; Elizabeth Infante as Chika Fujiwara — Kaguya-sama: Love Is War – Ultra Romantic; Erika Langarica as Marin Kitagawa — My Dress-Up Darling; Miguel de León as Loid Forger — Spy × Family; Víctor Hugo Aguilar as Ains Ooal Gown — Overlord (season 4)	**Special Achievement Award** No award given
**Presenter's Choice** No award given

=== Anime with multiple nominations and awards ===
Anime with multiple nominations
Nominations	Anime
19	Spy × Family
17	Ranking of Kings (cour 2)
13	Cyberpunk: Edgerunners
12	Attack on Titan: The Final Season Part 2
12	Demon Slayer: Kimetsu no Yaiba Entertainment District Arc
12	My Dress-Up Darling
8	Kaguya-sama: Love Is War – Ultra Romantic
8	Lycoris Recoil
6	Made in Abyss: The Golden City of the Scorching Sun
6	JoJo's Bizarre Adventure: Stone Ocean
5	Ya Boy Kongming!
4	Jujutsu Kaisen 0
4	Kotaro Lives Alone
3	Call of the Night
3	Dragon Ball Super: Super Hero
3	Komi Can't Communicate (season 2)
2	86
2	One Piece Film: Red
2	Overlord (season 4)

Anime with multiple wins
Wins	Anime
6	Attack on Titan: The Final Season Part 2
6	Demon Slayer: Kimetsu no Yaiba Entertainment District Arc
6	Spy × Family
3	Jujutsu Kaisen 0
2	Cyberpunk: Edgerunners

=== Studios with multiple nominations and awards ===
Studios with multiple nominations
Nominations	Studios	Anime(s)
39	Wit Studio	Spy × Family, Ranking of Kings, Bubble, Vampire in the Garden, and Vinland Saga (season 1)
33	CloverWorks	Spy × Family, My Dress-Up Darling, Akebi's Sailor Uniform, and Shadows House (season 2)
18	A-1 Pictures	Kaguya-sama: Love Is War – Ultra Romantic, Lycoris Recoil, and 86
18	MAPPA	Attack on Titan: The Final Season Part 2, Jujutsu Kaisen 0, Dance Dance Danseur, and Jujutsu Kaisen (cour 1)
13	Studio Trigger and CD Projekt	Cyberpunk: Edgerunners
12	Ufotable	Demon Slayer: Kimetsu no Yaiba Entertainment District Arc
7	David Production	JoJo's Bizarre Adventure: Stone Ocean and JoJo's Bizarre Adventure: Diamond Is Unbreakable
7	Liden Films	Kotaro Lives Alone and Call of the Night
6	Kinema Citrus	Made in Abyss: The Golden City of the Scorching Sun
6	Toei Animation	Dragon Ball Super: Super Hero, One Piece Film: Red, and One Piece
5	P.A. Works	Ya Boy Kongming!
5	Madhouse	Overlord (season 4) and Hunter × Hunter
3	OLM	Komi Can't Communicate (season 2)
3	Production I.G	Aoashi, Haikyu!! To the Top (season 4), and The Deer King
2	Bones	My Hero Academia (season 1) and The Case Study of Vanitas (cour 2)
2	Science SARU	Inu-Oh and Yurei Deco
2	TMS Entertainment	Detective Conan: The Bride of Halloween and Rent-A-Girlfriend (season 2)

Studios with multiple wins
Wins	Studios	Anime(s)
10	MAPPA	Attack on Titan: The Final Season Part 2, Jujutsu Kaisen 0, and Jujutsu Kaisen (cour 1)
7	Wit Studio	Spy × Family and Ranking of Kings
6	CloverWorks	Spy × Family
6	Ufotable	Demon Slayer: Kimetsu no Yaiba Entertainment District Arc
2	A-1 Pictures	Kaguya-sama: Love Is War – Ultra Romantic and Lycoris Recoil
2	Studio Trigger and CD Projekt	Cyberpunk: Edgerunners

== Presenters and performers ==
The following individuals, listed in order of appearance, presented awards or a short monologue:

Presenters
Names	Role
Roland	Presented the award for Best Original Anime
Haruka Kaki	Presented the award for Best Character Design
Kendo Kobayashi	Presented the awards for Best Animation and Best Comedy
Aidan Hutchinson; JuJu Smith-Schuster	Presented the award for Best Continuing Series
Zelina Vega; Jacob Bertrand (Note: Only shown in the award for Best Romance)	Presented the awards for Best Romance and Best Anime Song
Finn Wolfhard; Nick Wolfhard	Presented the award for Best Fantasy
Hunter Schafer	Presented the award for Best Score
Sawa Suzuki	Presented the award for Best Film
Robert Rodriguez	Presented the award for Best Director
Valkyrae; Sykkuno	Presented the award for Anime of the Year

The following individuals, listed in order of appearance, performed musical numbers:

Performers
Names	Role	Work
Kohta Yamamoto	Performer	Composing "Ashes on The Fire" from the first part in the final season of Attack on Titan
Yuki Kajiura	Performer	Composing "Homura" from Demon Slayer: Kimetsu no Yaiba – The Movie: Mugen Train
ALI; Aklo	Performers	"Lost in Paradise" from Jujutsu Kaisen

== Ceremony information ==
Crunchyroll announced the change of eligibility period format to the anime released from November 2021 to September 2022 were eligible for nominations for this edition. Crunchyroll announced the judges and categories on December 8, 2022. This edition featured 31 categories, and was divided into "main categories" and "fan categories". The winners for the main categories were announced physically, while winners for the fan categories were announced via a global livestream event that was held prior. New categories were introduced: "Must Protect at All Costs" Character, Best Original Anime, Presenter's Choice, Best Anime Song, Best Supporting Character, and Best New Series. Best Continuing Series was reinstated after being absent since 2019. Best Main Character and Best Supporting Character replaced Best Protagonist, Best Antagonist, Best Boy, and Best Girl categories. A Special Achievement Award was introduced after it was not awarded in the previous editions. Presenter's Choice was also introduced. However, both of these awards were not presented during the ceremony. Two new languages, Arabic and Italian, were included in the Best Voice Actor Performance, but Russian was dropped. The awards for Best Fight Scene were dropped.

The list of nominees were announced on the first day of voting, January 19. Voting closed on January 25. Voting for the Anime of the Year category included "social voting" for the first time, which allowed Twitter users to vote for the category by posting the necessary hashtags or by retweeting. Previous winners ALI and Aklo, Yuki Kajiura, and Kohta Yamamoto performed at the ceremony, while singer Haruka Kaki of Nogizaka46, comedian Kendo Kobayashi, entertainer Roland, and actress Sawa Suzuki presented the awards to the winners together with various voice actors and entertainers. Sony CEO Kenichiro Yoshida is giving opening remarks to the show. Sony Music Solutions collaborated with Crunchyroll in planning and operations, with Telescope Inc. administering the voting process.
