= Pandora (SiM album) =

Studio album by SiM
- Released: October 23, 2013
- Genre: Punk; reggae; ska; alternative rock; post-hardcore; nu metal
- Length: 40:43
- Label: Nayutawave Records

SiM chronology
Seeds of Hope (2011)	Pandora (2013)	The Beautiful People (2016)

Pandora is the third full-length album by Japanese reggae punk band SiM, released on October 23, 2013. It reached fifth place on the Oricon weekly chart and charted for 13 weeks.

== Track listing ==
Pandora
No.	Title	Length
1.	"Pandora"	1:29
2.	"Who's Next"	4:16
3.	"Pieces Of Troops"	3:16
4.	"Brain"	2:14
5.	"Blah Blah Blah"	3:48
6.	"Boring People, Fucking Grays"	3:24
7.	"Dubsolution #4"	2:58
8.	"We're All Alone"	3:36
9.	"Rosso & Dry"	5:00
10.	"Keep It Burnin'"	2:58
11.	"March Of The Robots"	2:00
12.	"Dreaming Dreams"	2:02
13.	"Upside Down"	3:42
Total length:		40:43

== Personnel ==
- Manabu Taniguti (MAH) — vocals
- Masahira Iida (SHOW-HATE) — guitars, keyboards
- Shinya Shinohara (SIN) — bass guitar
- Yuya Taniguchi (GODRi) — drums
