= Crunchyroll Anime Award for Best Anime Song =

- Awarded for: Best song in anime films and series of the previous year
- Country: United States; Japan
- First award: "The Rumbling" by SiM — Attack on Titan: The Final Season Part 2 (2023)
- Currently held by: "Iris Out" by Kenshi Yonezu — Chainsaw Man – The Movie: Reze Arc (2026)

Highlights
- Most nominations: Artist: Kenshi Yonezu / Yoasobi (3); Franchise: Chainsaw Man (3)
- Website: Crunchyroll Anime Awards

The Crunchyroll Anime Award for Best Anime Song is a music award given at the Crunchyroll Anime Awards since its seventh edition in 2023. It is given for the best song in anime films and series from the previous year. Winners are determined through a combined voting process by judges and public voting.

The song "The Rumbling" performed by the metal band SiM for the second part in the fourth and final season of Attack on Titan first won the award in 2023. Chainsaw Man holds the record for the most nominations (3) for an anime franchise, with Kenshi Yonezu and Yoasobi have the most nominations (3) for an artist.

In the latest edition in 2026, "Iris Out" performed by Kenshi Yonezu in Chainsaw Man – The Movie: Reze Arc won the award.

== Winners and nominees ==
In the following list, the first titles listed in gold are the winners; those not in gold are nominees, which are listed the sequences in alphabetical order. The years given are those in which the ceremonies took place.

=== 2020s ===
Year	Song	Anime	Recipient(s)
2021/2022 (7th)
2021/2022 (7th)	"The Rumbling"	Attack on Titan: The Final Season Part 2 (season 4 cour 2)	SiM
2021/2022 (7th)	"Chikichiki Banban"	Ya Boy Kongming!	Queendom
2021/2022 (7th)	"Comedy"	Spy × Family	Gen Hoshino
2021/2022 (7th)	"My Nonfiction"	Kaguya-sama: Love Is War – Ultra Romantic (season 3)	Makoto Furukawa and Konomi Kohara
2021/2022 (7th)	"New Genesis"	One Piece Film: Red	Ado
2021/2022 (7th)	"Shall We Dance?"	Shadows House (season 2)	Reona
2022/2023 (8th)
2022/2023 (8th)	"Idol"	Oshi no Ko	Yoasobi
2022/2023 (8th)	"Kick Back"	Chainsaw Man	Kenshi Yonezu
2022/2023 (8th)	"Seishun Complex"	Bocchi the Rock!	Kessoku Band
2022/2023 (8th)	"Suzume"	Suzume	Radwimps feat. Toaka
2022/2023 (8th)	"Where Our Blue Is"	Jujutsu Kaisen (season 2)	Tatsuya Kitani
2022/2023 (8th)	"Work"	Hell's Paradise	Ringo Sheena and Millennium Parade
2023/2024 (9th)
2023/2024 (9th)	"Otonoke"	Dandadan	Creepy Nuts
2023/2024 (9th)	"Abyss"	Kaiju No. 8	Yungblud
2023/2024 (9th)	"Bling-Bang-Bang-Born"	Mashle: Magic and Muscles The Divine Visionary Candidate Exam Arc (season 2)	Creepy Nuts
2023/2024 (9th)	"Fatal"	Oshi no Ko (season 2)	Gemn
2023/2024 (9th)	"Level"	Solo Leveling	SawanoHiroyuki[nZk]: Tomorrow X Together
2023/2024 (9th)	"The Brave"	Frieren: Beyond Journey's End	Yoasobi
2025 (10th)
2025 (10th)	"Iris Out"	Chainsaw Man – The Movie: Reze Arc	Kenshi Yonezu
2025 (10th)	"In Bloom"	The Apothecary Diaries (season 2)	Lilas Ikuta
2025 (10th)	"Jane Doe"	Chainsaw Man – The Movie: Reze Arc	Kenshi Yonezu and Hikaru Utada
2025 (10th)	"On the Way"	Dandadan (season 2)	Aina the End
2025 (10th)	"Reawaker"	Solo Leveling: Arise from the Shadow (season 2)	LiSA feat. Felix of Stray Kids
2025 (10th)	"Watch Me!"	Witch Watch	Yoasobi

== Records ==
=== Anime films and series ===
Franchise	Wins	Nominations	Seasons
Chainsaw Man	1	3	Season 1, Reze Arc (Note: Two songs from the film were nominated in the same year.)
Dandadan	1	2	Season 1, Season 2
Oshi no Ko	1	2	Season 1, Season 2
Solo Leveling	0	2	Season 1, Arise from the Shadow

=== Artist ===
Artist	Wins	Nominations	Anime
Kenshi Yonezu	1	3	Chainsaw Man (Season 1, Reze Arc)
Yoasobi	1	3	Frieren: Beyond Journey's End, Oshi no Ko, Witch Watch
Creepy Nuts	1	2	Dandadan, Mashle: Magic and Muscles (The Divine Visionary Candidate Exam Arc)
