= The Beautiful People (album) =

Studio album by SiM
- Released: April 6, 2016
- Genre: Alternative rock; alternative metal; punk rock; reggae rock; post-hardcore; nu metal
- Length: 49:22
- Label: EMI Records

SiM chronology
Pandora (2013)	The Beautiful People (2016)	Thank God, There are Hundreds of Ways to Kill Enemies (2020)

Singles from The Beautiful People
- 1. "Existence" Released: November 12, 2014; 2. "Crows" Released: October 7, 2015

The Beautiful People is the fourth full-length album by Japanese reggae punk band SiM, released on April 6, 2016. It reached sixth place on the Oricon weekly chart and charted for 12 weeks.

The song from the album, "No Future", was featured in arcade game Mobile Suit Gundam Extreme Vs Maxi Boost ON opening. Their single "Existence" was used as Shingeki no Bahamut: Genesis anime theme song, while "Crows" used on Crows: BURNING EDGE PS4/PSVita game song. "Existence" peaked at #20 on Billboard Japan Hot 100 and "Crows" reached #18 on Billboard Japan Hot 100, stayed for 2 weeks.

== Track listing ==
All tracks written by MAH.

No.	Title	Length
1.	"Make Me Dead!"	3:57
2.	"No Future"	3:30
3.	"The King"	3:20
4.	"Abel and Cain"	4:07
5.	"Paradox"	3:22
6.	"If I Die"	3:30
7.	"I Dub U"	3:50
8.	"Dance in the Dark"	4:02
9.	"Gunshots"	3:50
10.	"Crows"	3:50
11.	"The Problem"	4:05
12.	"Existence"	4:04
13.	"Life is Beautiful"	3:55
Total length:		49:22

== Personnel ==
- Manabu Taniguti (MAH) — vocals
- Masahira Iida (SHOW-HATE) — guitars, keyboards
- Shinya Shinohara (SIN) — bass guitar
- Yuya Taniguchi (GODRi) — drums
