= Seeds of Hope (disambiguation) =

Seeds of Hope may refer to:

- Seeds of Hope, group of women activists who carried out an anti-war action in 1996
- Seeds of Hope: HIV/AIDS in Ethiopia, 2004 documentary film series directed by Dorothy Fadiman
- Seeds of Hope (album), 2011 studio album by Japanese reggae punk band SiM
- Seeds of Hope: Wisdom and Wonder from the World of Plants, 2013 book by Jane Goodall

== See also ==
- Seed of Hope, television drama series that aired in Hong Kong in 2003
