= Under the Tree (SiM song) =

Single by SiM

Single by SiM

from the album Playdead
- Language: English; Japanese
- Released: March 4, 2023
- Length: 2:01
- Label: Pony Canyon
- Composer: SiM
- Lyricist: MAH

SiM singles chronology
"The Rumbling" (2022)	"Under the Tree" (2023)

"Under the Tree" (stylized in all caps) is a single created by the Japanese band SiM and released by Pony Canyon. It serves as the ending theme for the anime television special Attack on Titan: The Final Chapters Part 1, which aired on NHK General TV on March 4, 2023.

== Background and announcement ==
SiM made their musical debut for the anime Attack on Titan in 2022 with the song "The Rumbling". The opening theme was met with overall positive audience feedback, amassing a total of 200 million listens on streaming platforms at the time of the release of "Under the Tree". The band's success in making the previous opening motivated the producers of the series to bring back SiM to perform the anime's final theme song.

The song was announced for the first time on SiM's Twitter account on February 25, 2023, along with the cover art for the song and its release date of March 4, 2023.

== Release ==
Alongside various music streaming platforms including Spotify, Apple Music, Deezer, and Linkfire; the song was released exclusively on NHK television during the one-hour special premiere of the anime's new series on March 4, 2023, at 12:00 AM JST, before being released internationally on Crunchyroll, Funimation, and Hulu.

Upon the song's release; the song drew largely positive feedback from the community. The song was also released alongside a "special animation video" published by Pony Canyon on their YouTube channel.

On July 14, 2023, the full length version of the song was announced, and would be released as part of SiM's new album Playdead on September 27, 2023.

== Contents ==
According to a separate statement made by SiM's lyricist MAH also on February 25; the music includes elements of string orchestra, choir, and deep bass mixed together. In universe, the song is also themed to be "Mikasa's song", in contrast to SiM's previous single "The Rumbling", which focused primarily on the show's protagonist Eren Yeager. The song's cover art also depicts Mikasa who has taken off a red scarf that Eren gave her when they were children, symbolizing a rift taking place between the two characters in the show.

== Track listing ==
No.	Title	Lyrics	Music	Arrangement	Length
1.	"Under the Tree"	MAH	SiM	SiM	2:01
Total length:					2:01

== Charts ==
=== Weekly charts ===
Weekly chart performance for "Under the Tree"
Chart (2023)	Peak position
Japan Download Songs (Billboard Japan)	44
New Zealand Hot Singles (RMNZ)	31
US Hot Hard Rock Songs (Billboard)	10
US Hot Rock & Alternative Songs (Billboard)	46
