= Seeds of Hope (album) =

Studio album by SiM
- Released: October 12, 2011
- Genre: Alternative rock; punk; reggae; ska; post-hardcore; metalcore
- Length: 42:34
- Label: gil soundworks

SiM chronology
Silence iz Mine (2008)	Seeds of Hope (2011)	Pandora (2013)

Singles from Seeds of Hope
- 1. "Murderer" Released: March 20, 2009

Seeds of Hope is the second full-length album by the Japanese reggae punk band SiM, released on October 12, 2011. It reached 55th place on the Oricon weekly chart and charted for 18 weeks.

== Track listing ==
Seeds of Hope
No.	Title	Length
1.	"Killing Me"	2:55
2.	"Succubus"	2:49
3.	"I Hate U (It's Not A Play On Words)"	2:58
4.	"Misery"	3:02
5.	"Fixit"	2:56
6.	"Punk Rock iz Coming"	3:13
7.	"On And On"	2:33
8.	"I'm Alright"	2:47
9.	"Fall In Love With You"	3:38
10.	"Faster Than The Clock"	2:32
11.	"Living Dead"	2:40
12.	"Dubsolution #3"	2:17
13.	"A Song Of Hope"	4:23
14.	"Murderer" (single version)	4:01
Total length:		42:34

== Personnel ==
- Manabu Taniguti (MAH) — vocals
- Masahira Iida (SHOW-HATE) — guitars, keyboards
- Shinya Shinohara (SIN) — bass guitar
- Yuya Taniguchi (GODRi) — drums
