= The Rumbling =

- Standard and limited editions cover

Single by SiM

from the EP Beware
- Released: February 7, 2022
- Recorded: 2021
- Genre: Heavy metal; metalcore
- Length: 3:40
- Label: Pony Canyon
- Composer: SiM
- Lyricist: MAH

SiM singles chronology
"Captain Hook" (2020)	"The Rumbling" (2022)	"Under the Tree" (2023)

Audio sample
- file; help

Music video
- "The Rumbling" on YouTube

Alternate cover
- TV size cover

"The Rumbling" is a single recorded by Japanese alternative metal band SiM, released from the EP Beware through Pony Canyon label. The television edit version of the song was released on January 10, 2022, while the full version was released on February 7, 2022. The song was featured as the opening theme song for the anime Attack on Titan: The Final Season Part 2. It peaked at No. 1 on the US Hot Hard Rock Songs chart, No. 5 on the US Bubbling Under Hot 100 Singles chart, No. 13 on the US Hot Rock & Alternative Songs chart, and No. 23 on the UK Rock & Metal Singles Chart.

== Background and release ==
The song was the first single released after the band's label transfer to Pony Canyon and was used as the opening theme song for the anime Attack on Titan: The Final Season Part 2. The release date of "The Rumbling" was not announced in advance, but the television edit version released unannounced on January 9, 2022, the day the first episode of the anime aired. The full version of the song was later announced to be released digitally on February 7, 2022. The physical version was released on May 25, 2022, in vinyl, limited to 5,000 copies worldwide.

== Composition and lyrics ==
"The Rumbling" was written entirely in English, in the key of C minor and is set in time signature of common time with a tempo of 145 BPM. It was composed by the band and the lyrics were written by vocalist MAH for the anime Attack on Titan: The Final Season Part 2. The song has been described as a metalcore song with heavy strings elements.

According to vocalist MAH, the song was made from May to June 2021 on Pony Canyon offer after their transfer to the label. MAH and guitarist SHOW-HATE made 4 songs together since they knew Attack on Titan very well, then one of the songs entitled "The Rumbling" was chosen for the anime. Unlike their previous works, they decided to put strings and chorus to the song to keep the feeling of the previous theme songs of the anime while still retaining the band's musical style with reggae part in the middle. They made the whole song to be up tempo then changed the rhythm to be slower.

== Music video ==
The music video for "The Rumbling" was released on March 2, 2022, after being teased with two short trailers three weeks before. Directed by Taiyo Yamamoto, it features the band performing the song in Attack on Titan setting.

As of May 2025, the music video for "The Rumbling" has over 80 million views on YouTube.

The band also released the official instrumental playthrough videos for drums, bass, and guitar on their YouTube channel.

== Commercial performance ==
The song became SiM's most commercially successful song, debuted at No. 3 on the US Hot Hard Rock Songs chart, No. 15 on the US Hard Rock Digital Song Sales chart, No. 30 on the US Hot Rock & Alternative Songs chart, and No. 23 on the UK Rock & Metal Singles chart in its first week. It hit No. 1 on the US Hot Hard Rock Songs chart the following week and No. 13 on the US Hot Rock & Alternative Songs chart on the chart dated February 19. The song also entered the US Hard Rock Streaming Songs chart at No. 18 on January 27, 2022, with over 2.1 million US streams. After the release of the full song, "The Rumbling" re-entered the US Hard Rock Digital Song Sales chart, jumped to No. 2. It also debuted at No. 5 on the US Bubbling Under Hot 100 Singles, and No. 92 on the Billboard Global 200 chart. In the band's home country of Japan, it charted at No. 67 on the Japan Hot 100 and No. 5 on the Oricon Digital Singles chart, selling 8,065 downloads in its first week.

== Track listing ==
The Rumbling (TV size)
No.	Title	Length
1.	"The Rumbling" (TV Size)	1:30
Total length:		1:30

The Rumbling
No.	Title	Length
1.	"The Rumbling"	3:40
Total length:		3:40

The Rumbling limited edition – Side A
No.	Title	Length
1.	"The Rumbling"	3:40

The Rumbling limited edition – Side B
No.	Title	Length
2.	"The Rumbling" (instrumental)	3:40
3.	"The Rumbling" (TV size)	1:30
Total length:		8:50

== Personnel ==
SiM

- Manabu "MAH" Taniguti – vocals, lyrics
- Shouhei "SHOW-HATE" Iida – guitars, keyboards, backing vocals
- Shinya "SiN" Shinohara – bass guitar, backing vocals
- Yuya "GODRi" Taniguchi – drums, backing vocals

== Charts ==
=== Weekly charts ===
Weekly chart performance for "The Rumbling"
Chart (2022)	Peak position
Global 200 (Billboard)	92
Hungary (Single Top 40)	28
Japan (Japan Hot 100)	67
Japan (Oricon)	28
New Zealand Hot Singles (RMNZ)	31
UK Rock & Metal (OCC)	23
US Bubbling Under Hot 100 Singles (Billboard)	5
US Hot Rock & Alternative Songs (Billboard)	13

=== Year-end charts ===
Year-end chart performance for "The Rumbling"
Chart (2022)	Position
US Hot Rock & Alternative Songs (Billboard)	47
US Hot Rock Songs (Billboard)	34

== Awards and nominations ==
Awards and nominations for "The Rumbling"
Ceremony	Year	Award	Result	Ref.
7th Crunchyroll Anime Awards	2023	Best Anime Song	Won	
7th Crunchyroll Anime Awards	2023	Best Opening Sequence	Won	
