= SiM =

Japanese alternative metal band

SiM (Silence iz Mine)
- Origin: Shonan, Kanagawa, Japan
- Genres: Nu metal; metalcore; ska punk; reggae rock
- Years active: 2004–present
- Labels: SME Records (2006–2011); gil soundworks (2011–2012); Universal Music Japan (2013–2022); Pony Canyon (2022–present); UNFD (2023–present)
- Members: MAH (Vocals); SHOW-HATE (Guitar); SIN (Bass); GODRi (Drums)
- Past members: KAH (Bass); BUN (Bass); WAY (Drums)
- Website: www.sxixm.com

SiM (Silence iz Mine) are a Japanese metalcore band from Kanagawa Prefecture formed in 2004. The band currently consists of MAH (vocals), SHOW-HATE (guitar), SIN (bass), and GODRi (drums). Their musical style mixes nu metal, alternative, hip-hop, ska, reggae, dub, and punk with rebellious lyrics (mostly in English) and songs with attitude.

The band signed with Pony Canyon in 2022 and released their single "The Rumbling", used as the opening theme for the anime Attack on Titan: The Final Season Part 2. The single entered the US Billboard charts at No. 1 on the Hot Hard Rock Songs, No. 5 on the Bubbling Under Hot 100 Singles, No. 2 on the Hard Rock Digital Song Sales, and No. 13 on the Hot Rock & Alternative Songs.

== History ==
=== 2004–2006: Formation ===
SiM was founded by MAH in November 2004 in Shonan, Kanagawa Prefecture, Japan. The band consisted of MAH on vocals and guitar, KAH on bass guitar, and WAY on drums. When they first formed, they called this three-piece band "Silence iz Mine” (the current band's name is an abbreviation of this). In 2006, SHOW-HATE joined and picked up guitar; KAH left the band, then BUN joined on bass until 2008.

In 2008, the band released their first full album entitled Silence iz Mine, and performed in Kyoto. In 2009, WAY left SiM, while SIN and GODRi joined the band. SIN played bass, and GODRi took WAY's place on drums.

=== 2010–2012: Seeds of Hope ===
In 2010, the band released their single "Anthem" under the Tower Records label and toured in Japan. During the tour, SHOW-HATE collapsed from a cerebral infarction, meaning the tour was suddenly cancelled. While waiting for SHOW-HATE’s recovery, ONO-SHiT toured with the band as a support member on guitar. On October 6, 2010, the band's first mini album LIVING IN PAiN was released. In 2011, their second full album Seeds of Hope was released.

On May 2, 2012, the band released their second mini album LiFE and DEATH.

=== 2013–2015: Pandora ===
In 2013, they joined the Monster Energy Outburn Tour 2013 with Coldrain. The band moved to Universal Music Japan and made a major debut with their single "Evils" on April 3, 2013. On October 23, they released the first album Pandora since their major debut, and the album peaked at fifth on the Oricon weekly chart.

In 2014, the band held a one-man performance at Shinkiba Studio Coast. Their third mini album i Against i was released in September.

On October 6, 2014, their single "Existence" was used as the opening theme for the anime Shingeki no Bahamut: Genesis (Rage of Bahamut: Genesis), and peaked the single peaked at No. 20 on the Billboard Japan Hot 100, while another single, "Crows" reached No. 18 on Billboard Japan Hot 100 and stayed there for 2 weeks.

On November 4, 2015, SiM performed at the Nippon Budokan for their THE TOUR 2015 FiNAL -ONE MAN SHOW at BUDOKAN. Tickets were sold out.

=== 2016–2018: The Beautiful People ===
On April 6, 2016, the band's fourth album The Beautiful People was released. On May 6, 2016, they appeared on the Fuji TV television series HEY! HEY! NEO! with the song "MAKE ME DEAD!". On May 11, 2016, SiM released the live DVD titled WHO SAYS WE CAN NOT of their performance at "The Tour 2015 FiNAL -One Man Show at Budokan”, achieving a ranking of fourth on the Oricon weekly DVD chart and fifth on the Blu-ray chart.

On September 25, SiM performed for the first time in the USA as a part of Ozzfest meets Knotfest. On October 16, the final performance of the tour "SiM THE BEAUTiFUL PEOPLE Tour 2016 Grand FiNAL Dead Man Walking" was held at the Yokohama Arena.

On February 22, 2017, SiM performed as the opening act on the "2017 One Ok Rock Ambitions Japan Tour" at Wakayama Big Whale. On April 7, 2017, the song "Let It End" was used as the opening theme for the anime Shingeki no Bahamut: Virgin Soul. On December 6, 2017, SiM released their seventh single "A / The Sound Of Breath", which was used in the soundtrack for the video game Yakuza Kiwami 2.

On November 20, 2018, the band released the single "Diamond". On December 12, 2018, the band released the single "Lion's Den", which was used as the opening song for Japan's Wrestle Kingdom 13.

=== 2019–2021: Thank God, There Are Hundreds of Ways to Kill Enemies ===
On November 3, 2019, the band released the single "Sand Castle" with Akkogorilla.

On January 30, 2020, the band announced that their new album, Thank God, There Are Hundreds of Ways to Kill Enemies, would be released on April 15, 2020. On February 11, 2020, the band released the single "BULLY". On March 17, the band released the single "Devil in Your Heart". On March 31, the single "BASEBALL BAT" was released. In April 2020, the band announced that the album's release date had been postponed to June 17, 2020. On May 11, the band released the single "CAPTAiN HOOK".

=== 2022–present: Playdead ===
In January 2022, SiM's song "The Rumbling" was the opening theme for the anime Attack on Titan: The Final Season Part 2. The single was released on February 7, 2022, coming just after the band moved to the Pony Canyon record label. SiM performed in the US at Crunchyroll Expo on August 6 and their sold-out headlining show on August 9, 2022. On September 21, the band released their new EP Beware, containing four tracks including "The Rumbling".

In March 2023, SiM's single "Under the Tree" was used as the ending theme song for the part 3 of the anime Attack on Titan: The Final Season. In August 2023, SiM joined Dance Gavin Dance for the Jackpot Juicer US Tour 2023, during which SiM released their sixth studio album, Playdead.

In November 2024, SiM frontman MAH led the formation of the REDLINE DREAM BAND, a 29-member supergroup created to commemorate the conclusion of the REDLINE festival's 14-year run. The band features prominent members from Japan's rock scene, including vocalists from FACT, MAN WITH A MISSION, and coldrain, as well as instrumentalists from Crossfaith, Crystal Lake, and Paledusk. The group is due to release a digital single on December 6, 2024, ahead of their participation in the festival's final event, REDLINE ALL THE FINAL, at Chiba's Makuhari Messe.

== Band members ==
Current members

- MAH (Manabu Taniguchi) – vocals (2004–present), guitars (2004–2006)
- SHOW-HATE (Shouhei Iida) – guitars, keyboards, backing vocals (2006–present)
- SIN (Shinya Shinohara) – bass guitar, backing vocals (2009–present)
- GODRi (Yuya Taniguchi) – drums, backing vocals (2009–present)

Former members

- KAH – bass guitar (2004–2006)
- BUN – bass guitar (2006–2008)
- WAY – drums (2004–2009)

Timeline

== Discography ==
=== Studio albums ===
Title	Album details	Peak position
Title	Album details	JPN
Silence Iz Mine	Released: June 25, 2008; Label: U-Project; Format: CD	—
Seeds of Hope	Released: October 12, 2011; Label: Gil Soundworks; Formats: CD, digital download	55
Pandora	Released: October 23, 2013; Label: Nayutawave Records; Formats: CD, digital download	5
The Beautiful People	Released: April 6, 2016; Label: EMI Records; Formats: CD, digital download	6
Thank God, There Are Hundreds of Ways to Kill Enemies	Released: June 17, 2020; Label: Universal Music Japan; Formats: CD, digital download	2
Playdead	Released: September 27, 2023; Label: Pony Canyon, UNFD; Formats: CD, digital download	16
Hooman After All	Released: November 3, 2026; Label: Pony Canyon, UNFD; Formats: CD, digital download	16

=== Mini albums ===
Title	Album details	Peak position
Title	Album details	JPN
Living in Pain	Released: October 6, 2010; Label: Dead Pop Records; Format: CD	221
Life and Death	Released: May 2, 2012; Label: Gil Soundworks; Formats: CD, digital download	9
I Against I	Released: September 17, 2014; Label: EMI Records; Formats: CD, digital download	7

=== Extended plays ===
Title	EP details	Peak position
Title	EP details	JPN
Beware	Released: September 21, 2022; Label: Pony Canyon; Formats: CD, digital download	20

=== Singles ===
Title	Year	Peak position							Album
Title	Year	JPN Oricon	JPN Billboard	US Bub.	US Rock	US Hard Rock	US Digital Rock	UK Rock	Album
"Paint Sky Blue"	2007	—	—	—	—	—	—	—	Silence iz Mine
"Murderer"	2009	—	—	—	—	—	—	—	Non-album singles
"Anthem"	2010	—	—	—	—	—	—	—	Non-album singles
"Evils"	2013	9	32	—	—	—	—	—	Non-album singles
"Existence"	2014	—	20	—	—	—	—	—	The Beautiful People
"Angels and Devils"	2015	9	—	—	—	—	—	—	Non-album single
"Crows"	2015	12	18	—	—	—	—	—	The Beautiful People
"Let it End"	2017	—	—	—	—	—	—	—	Thank God, There Are Hundreds Of Ways To Kill Enemies
"A / The Sound of Breath"	2017	12	50	—	—	—	—	—	Non-album single
"Diamond"	2018	—	—	—	—	—	—	—	Thank God, There Are Hundreds Of Ways To Kill Enemies
"Sand Castle" (featuring AkkoGorilla)	2019	—	—	—	—	—	—	—	Thank God, There Are Hundreds Of Ways To Kill Enemies
"Bully"	2020	—	—	—	—	—	—	—	Thank God, There Are Hundreds Of Ways To Kill Enemies
"Devil in Your Heart"	2020	—	—	—	—	—	—	—	Thank God, There Are Hundreds Of Ways To Kill Enemies
"Baseball Bat"	2020	—	—	—	—	—	—	—	Thank God, There Are Hundreds Of Ways To Kill Enemies
"Captain Hook"	2020	—	—	—	—	—	—	—	Thank God, There Are Hundreds Of Ways To Kill Enemies
"The Rumbling"	2022	28	67	5	13	1	2	23	Beware
"Under the Tree"	2023	—	—	—	46	10	18	—	Playdead
"FiVE TiMES DEAD (by my wallet)"	2026	—	—	—	—	—	—	—	HOOMAN AFTER ALL
"BLiNDEYES" (featuring HANABIE.)	2026								HOOMAN AFTER ALL

=== DVDs ===
Title	Details	Peak position
Title	Details	JPN
Dusk and Dawn	Released: November 14, 2012; Label: Gil Soundworks; Format: DVD	3
10 Years	Released: June 18, 2014; Label: Universal Music Japan; Format: DVD	4
Who Says We Can't	Released: May 11, 2016; Label: Universal Music Japan; Formats: DVD, Blu-ray	4
Dead Man Walking -Live at Yokohama Arena-	Released: April 26, 2017; Label: Universal Music Japan; Formats: DVD, Blu-ray	14
Kyoto Strategy 2007–2017 10th Anniversary! (京都大作戦2007–2017 10th ANNIVERSARY ! ～心ゆくまでご覧な祭～)	Released: June 27, 2018; Label: Universal Music Japan; Formats: DVD, Blu-ray	2
Kyoto Strategy 2017 Live-A festival you can see to the fullest- (京都大作戦2017 LIVE ～心ゆくまでご覧な祭～)	Released: June 27, 2018; Label: Universal Music Japan; Format: DVD	38

=== Covers ===
Year	Title	Original artists	Performed by	Released on	Notes
2008	"Come Together"	The Beatles	SiM	Silence iz Mine album	
2012	"Something In The Way"	Nirvana	SiM	Nevermind Tribute album	A tribute album by Japanese music artists (released on April 4, 2012) to celebrates 20th anniversary of Nirvana's masterpiece album Nevermind.

=== Collaborations ===
Year	Song	Artist	Album	Notes
2011	"The Maze" (featuring MAH)	Coldrain	The Enemy Inside	
2014	"Re-Education" (featuring MAH)	Skindred	Kill the Power (Japanese edition)	
2017	"Skyfall" (featuring MAH, Masato of coldrain, and Koie of Crossfaith)	One Ok Rock	Non-album single	Co-written by MAH.; Sold only at venues of "2017 ONE OK ROCK Ambitions Japan Tour".
2022	"Catch Me" (featuring MAH)	The Oral Cigarettes	Bullets into the Pipe EP	
2024	"Chains (The Tower)"	Fame on Fire	The Death Card	

== Awards and nominations ==
Year	Award	Category	Work/nominee	Result	Ref.
2013	Billboard Japan Music Awards	Independent Artist of the Year	SiM	Nominated	
2013	CD Shop Awards	Best Live Video	Dusk and Dawn	Won	
2014	Space Shower Music Video Awards	Best Video	"Who's Next"	Nominated	
2016	Space Shower Music Awards	Best Punk / Loud Rock Artist	SiM	Nominated	
2023	7th Crunchyroll Anime Awards	Best Anime Song	"The Rumbling" (from Attack on Titan: The Final Season Part 2 anime)	Won	
2023	7th Crunchyroll Anime Awards	Best Opening Sequence	"The Rumbling" (from Attack on Titan: The Final Season Part 2 anime)	Won	

== See also ==
- Japanese rock
