= Akuma no Ko =

2022 song by Ai Higuchi

- Official single cover

Single by Ai Higuchi

from the album Saiaku Saiai
- Language: Japanese
- Released: 10 January 2022
- Recorded: 2022
- Genre: Anime song
- Length: 3:47
- Label: Pony Canyon

"Akuma no Ko" (Japanese: 悪魔の子; lit. "A Child of Evil") (Note: Also translated as "Child of the Devil" or "Devil's Child".) is the second track created by the Japanese singer Ai Higuchi for their fourth album "Saiaku Saiai" (最悪最愛; lit. "Worst Beloved"). Originally released in a shortened version on 10 January 2022 to be used as the seventh ending for the anime Attack on Titan, the full version would be released as part of the album about two months later on 2 March 2022.

== Background and release ==
The song would first be released on 10 January 2022, as the A-side (Note: The B-side song being the unused "Massarana Daichi" (まっさらな大地; lit. "Brand New Earth".)) of a single made for the ending of the Attack on Titan: The Final Season Part 2. The song would be directed and edited by Sotaro Ishii, produced by Kosuke Nakaya, and released under a Pony Canyon label.

On 23 January 2022, an "anime special version" of the song was released by Ai Higuchi to YouTube, which displayed edited footage from primarily the first and final season of the anime. The full version of the song would be released on 2 March 2022 as the second track of Ai Higuchi's fourth album Saiaku Saiai.

== Performances ==
Along with other songs from her album Saiaku Saiai, Higuchi would perform the song live on multiple occasions. The song would first be performed live on a solo tour in Tokyo on 11 March 2022 and Osaka on 17 March. From April to May 2022, Higuchi would perform the song again on a national tour in cities including Fukuoka, Hiroshima, Kanazawa, Kobe, Kyoto, Nagano, Nagoya, Tokyo, and Takamatsu. From 22 November to 24 December 2022, Higuchi would sing the song on a solo tour in the cities of Fukuoka, Nagano, Nagoya, and Osaka, before reaching the final location at Shinagawa Prince Hotel Club eX in Tokyo.

In May 2023, a cover version of the song would be performed by Nagisa Aoyama as part of a project named "CrosSing", aiming to have musical artists create covers of songs of each music genre.

== Reception ==
Upon its initial release on 10 January 2022, the song would have a strong national and overseas appeal, reaching the top position on multiple music streaming service charts. On the Apple Music J-Pop rankings, the song would reach the top spot in 120 countries including France, Germany, Italy, and South Korea, and reach the top 10 spot in 135 countries. The song would see similar success on the iTunes Store J-Pop rankings: reaching the top spot in 48 countries including in Germany, Italy, United Kingdom, and United States, and reach the top 10 spot in 56 countries. The song would also reach the top spot on Spotify's Viral Top 50 chart in six countries and peak at 5th place on the global chart, and reach 6th place in Shazam's Top 200 ranking for Japan, and ranked in 30 countries other countries. On 22 November 2023, the "anime special version" of the song on YouTube released on 22 January 2022 reached 100 million views.

=== Chart performance ===
Weekly chart performance for "Akuma no Ko"
Chart (2022)	Peak position
Japan Heatseekers Songs (Billboard)	1
Japan Hot 100 (Billboard)	60
Japan Hot Animation (Billboard)	12

Chart (2023)	Peak position
Japan Download Songs (Billboard)	85

Yearly chart performance for "Akuma no Ko"
Chart (2022)	Peak position
Japan Download Songs (Billboard)	76

=== Accolades ===
Year	Award	Category	Recipient	Result	Ref.
2022	Crunchyroll Anime Awards	Best Ending Sequence	"Akuma no Ko"; Ai Higuchi, Attack on Titan Final Season Part 2	Nominated	
2022	Japan Expo Awards	Daruma for Best Ending	"Akuma no Ko"; Attack on Titan Season Finale Part 2 - Ai Higuchi	Won	
2022	Anime Grand Prix	Best Anime Song	"Akuma no Ko" "Attack on Titan" The Final Season Part 2	10th place	
