= Bubble (2022 film) =

2022 Japanese anime film

- Promotional release poster

Japanese name
- Japanese: バブル
Transcriptions
- Revised Hepburn: Baburu
- Directed by: Tetsurō Araki
- Screenplay by: Gen Urobuchi; Naoko Sato; Renji Ōki
- Produced by: Tetsuya Nakatake; Mirai Kase
- Starring: Jun Shison; Riria; Alice Hirose; Mamoru Miyano; Yuki Kaji; Tasuku Hatanaka
- Cinematography: Kazuhiro Yamada
- Edited by: Aya Hida
- Music by: Hiroyuki Sawano
- Production company: Wit Studio
- Distributed by: Warner Bros. Pictures (Japan, theatrical); Netflix (worldwide)
- Release dates: February 10, 2022 (Berlin); April 28, 2022 (Netflix); May 13, 2022 (theatrical)
- Running time: 100 minutes
- Country: Japan
- Language: Japanese
- Box office: $509,309

Bubble (Japanese: バブル, Hepburn: Baburu) is a 2022 Japanese animated post-apocalyptic film produced by Wit Studio. It was directed by Tetsurō Araki and written by Gen Urobuchi with character designs by Takeshi Obata and music composed by Hiroyuki Sawano. The film had early screenings at the Berlin International Film Festival on February 10, 2022. It was followed by its worldwide release on Netflix on April 28, 2022, before it was released theatrically in Japan in May. A manga adaptation of the film by Erubo Hijihara was serialized in Shōnen Jump+ from April 22 to May 23, 2022.

== Plot ==
In the near future, the world is overcome by bubbles that break the laws of reality. An explosion at Tokyo Tower concentrates all the bubbles in Tokyo, but makes the city uninhabitable. Various young folk defy the restrictions, and live there anyway, using parkour tournaments as a means to barter and trade supplies. In one parkour team, the Blue Blazes, 18-year-old Hibiki is an exceptional parkour talent, but he avoids others due to a hearing ultrasensitivity. Tokyo Tower continues to be an impossible location to get to because of gravity anomalies.

One day, Hibiki attempts to climb the tower because he hears a woman's song, and believes he sees a boy there. He almost makes it, but ends up falling into the ocean, where his final exhale combines with some of the bubbles to make a young girl. She is clearly new to being a human, but learns quickly from others. Hibiki names her "Uta" ("Song") because she knows the song he hears in his head. Uta and Hibiki train parkour together, beating a team called the Morticians/Undertakers, however, in one final catch, when Uta touches Hibiki, her arm fades away into bubbles. Bubble activity starts up again, so the Tokyo residents need to flee. Uta goes to Tokyo Tower to stop it. Hibiki goes to save her.

In the final scene they save each other, but Uta fades into bubbles as in the original fairy tale from Hans Christian Andersen: "The Little Mermaid." In her final breath, she tells Hibiki that he made it worth it for her to be human. With the bubbles gone, the citizens of Tokyo return and start to rebuild. The parkour teams continue their lives too. Whether real or imagined, in the end credits, Hibiki is still continuing to do parkour as a bubble (implied to be Uta) follows him.

== Voice cast ==
Character	Japanese voice	English voice
Hibiki	Jun Shison	Zach Aguilar; Jeannie Tirado (young)
Uta	Riria.	Emi Lo
Makoto	Alice Hirose	Erica Lindbeck
Shin	Mamoru Miyano	Keith Silverstein
Kai	Yuki Kaji	Robbie Daymond
Usagi	Sayaka Senbongi	Laura Stahl
Denki Ninja	Tasuku Hatanaka	Kyle McCarley
Undertaker Leader	Marina Inoue	Cristina Vee
Kantō Mad Lobster	Shin-ichiro Miki	Chris Jai Alex

== Music ==
The film's score is composed by Hiroyuki Sawano. The opening theme song is "Bubble feat. Uta" performed by Eve, while the ending theme song is "Jaa ne, Mata ne" (じゃあね、またね。; "See You, Catch You Later") performed by Riria, who voices Uta in the film.

Bubble (Original Motion Picture Soundtrack)

Soundtrack album by Hiroyuki Sawano
- Released: May 11, 2022
- Genre: Soundtrack
- Length: 73:28
- Label: Toy's Factory
- Producer: Hiroyuki Sawano

=== Track listing ===
All music is composed by Hiroyuki Sawano.

Bubble (Original Motion Picture Soundtrack) track listing
No.	Title	Music	Length
1.	"BUBBLE"		1:58
2.	"BATTLEKOUR"		5:21
3.	"BB"		00:53
4.	"JU-RYOKU"		2:35
5.	"BB2"		2:29
6.	"MERMAID"		4:18
7.	"HIBIKI"		1:56
8.	"UTAtoHIBIKI"		1:32
9.	"UNDERTAKER"		2:15
10.	"BBxUT"		3:20
11.	"PARKOUR"		3:56
12.	"UTA"		1:57
13.	"2ndBUBBLE"		5:29
14.	"TOWER"		5:57
15.	"NE-SAMA"		2:20
16.	"BUBBLE-cho."		6:49
17.	"BUBBLE-THEME"		3:54
18.	"Bubble"	Eve	3:48
19.	"Bubble (TeddyLoid Remix)"	Eve	3:23
20.	"Shikisai (色彩)"		5:13
21.	"Bye Bye, See You (じゃあね、またね。)"	Riria.	4:05
Total length:			73:28

== Reception ==
=== Critical response ===
On the review aggregator website Rotten Tomatoes, 52% of 22 critics' reviews are positive, with an average rating of 5.6/10. Metacritic, which uses a weighted average, assigned the film a score of 56 out of 100, based on 5 critics, indicating "mixed or average" reviews.

On Decider, Brittany Vincent gave the film a "Stream It" recommendation, praising the "thoughtful sci-fi adventure" for its "gorgeous animation" and its ability to combine the "bittersweet yearning" of a coming-of-age story with a hopeful, post-apocalyptic setting. Writing for IGN, she also described it as a "captivating and gorgeous piece of sci-fi" that rises above "simple post-apocalyptic sludge" through its unique, gravity-defying landscape and heartfelt romance.

Max Covill for The A.V. Club gave it an unfavorable review, praising its "stunning" and thrilling parkour animation that "pops off the screen", but ultimately feeling the production fell into predictable tropes and a narrative that stopped organically moving to explain itself through multiple monologues. Ali Griffiths of Digital Spy reported that it was a "high-octane, romantic drama" with truly outstanding parkour action and a crisp modern look, praising its vibrant animation and commitment to motion, though he noted that underwritten characters and a "truly confusing and muddled finale" ultimately prevented the adventure from vaulting to first place.

Lynzee Loveridge of Anime News Network praised the film's "visually beautiful" landscape and breathless action sequences that expertly utilize a smooth 3D camera, though she noted that a lack of genuine conflict and thinly-realized characters ultimately made it fail to create a truly compelling romance. Kambole Campbell of Polygon gave the film a positive review, praising its "handsomely animated" parkour set-pieces, vivid visual poetry, and meditative exploration of character psychology, despite noting that the world-building was hindered by "heavy-handed exposition" and several half-formed narrative ideas.

Matt Kodner, from Den of Geek, gave it a positive review, stating, "Despite a first act that will certainly be a hard sell for folks unfamiliar with the project's creative minds, Bubble is an endlessly rewarding movie that combines jaw-dropping splendor with a surprisingly complex story and real emotional sincerity under its breathtaking parkour action." Shannon Connellan of Mashable praised it as a "dazzling new take on the apocalypse genre" that boasts "magnificent animation" and a truly spectacular score, though she noted that its plot is predictable and leaves its central characters with a "pretty small amount" of valuable room for development.

Bubble grossed $509,309 at the box office.

=== Accolades ===
Year	Award	Category	Nominee(s)	Result	Ref.
2022	72nd Berlin International Film Festival	Generation 14plus – Crystal Bear for the Best Film	Tetsurō Araki	Nominated	
2022	Asian Academy Creative Awards	Best Animated Programme or Series (2D or 3D)	Bubble	Won	
2023	7th Crunchyroll Anime Awards	Best Film	Bubble	Nominated	
