= Roland (entertainer) =

Japanese businessman and TV personality

- ローランド
- Born: Fuuga Matsuo (松尾 風雅, Matsuo Fuuga); July 27, 1992 (age 34); Hachioji, Tokyo, Japan
- Other names: Makoto Tojo (東城 誠, Tojo Makoto)
- Occupations: Host, fashion model, TV personality, entrepreneur
- Height: 1.83 m (6 ft 0 in)
- Website: https://roland-official.com/

Roland (stylized in all caps) is a Japanese host, fashion model, TV personality, and entrepreneur. He is the representative director of Roland Group HD, Inc. As the Kabukicho host club sales record holder, he has been nicknamed "King of the Hosts". His income amounts to 42 million yen per month; his cosmetic surgery costs have incurred more than 10 million yen, with touch-up procedures costing 200 thousand yen per month.

== History ==
Roland was born Fuuga Matsuo (松尾 風雅) in 1992 in Tokyo. After graduating from Teikyo Koutou School, he proceeded to Teikyo Heisei University, where he eventually dropped out and made his host debut at age 18 as Makoto Tojo. After a year as a low ranking employee, he became representative director of the club he had been working at age 21.

In 2013, as the lead host at Club PLATINA -Main Branch-, part of the prominent host club group KG-produce, he generated a record amount of cash flow. Afterwards, he made appearances on many TV programs and became active as a talent.

In August 2017, he changed his pseudonym from Makoto Tojo to ROLAND.

His birthday event in 2018 brought sales of more than 60 million yen to his host club, making a new record for highest sales in the group. At that time, he hosted broadcasts on TV Asahi keiretsu's variety TV show, Sono Saki, making his name known to the general public. Afterwards, he quit working as a lead host and separated from KG-produce. Since October 2018, he is affiliated with his office, Schwarz, which he created.

In 2019, he opened his first exhibition at Ikebukuro PARCO, titled Ro LAND ~Ore ka, Ore Igai ka~, which included virtual reality elements. A total of 100,000 people attended. In April of that same year, he opened a host club, named THE CLUB.

On 28 February 2020, ROLAND opened his YouTube channel, THE ROLAND SHOW. As of 18 March 2020, his videos had been viewed a total of 2,300,000 times, and the number of subscribers to his channel has surpassed 97,000. In response to the Tokyo government's request for self-quarantine due to the spread of the Coronavirus disease 2019 pandemic, THE CLUB suspended operations from April to 26 May. Due to measures to prevent the spread of the virus, businesses were able to reopen at the end of May. On 9 July, the number of infected people in the city reached a new peak. As it was determined that further business was no longer possible, THE CLUB was permanently closed on the same day.

On August 3, ROLAND was featured in a collaboration with PlayerUnknown's Battlegrounds, appearing in a voice card.

On December 16 of the same year, he co-produced women's dress and lingerie brand G&R in collaboration with musician Gackt; however, three days after the press release, some of the dresses were accused of copying from foreign brands. The operating company Dazzy (stylized as dazzy) confirmed suspicions that the designs had been copied, and announced that items and merchandise which were sold were recalled and refunded. On Roland's official YouTube channel, Roland released an apology in regard to the incident and announced the end of his contract with dazzy.

On December 18, 2020, a manga titled Roland Zero (ローランド・ゼロ) by Noriyoshi Inoue was released, based loosely on Roland's journey to becoming a top host. When talking about the project, Roland said that his dream had been granted. Various promotional campaigns were run for its first release. As of 28 January 2021, the manga had sold over 100,000 copies, and a second volume was announced.

In March 2021, Roland ran a limited-time pop-up shop in the Shibuya Hikarie building for his menswear brand Christian Roland. Further apologizing for the G&R incident, he said that this time, he didn't want to sell anything that isn't 100% produced by the collaboration of himself and designer Munetaka Yokoyama.

On April 21, 2021, Roland released a book titled ROLAND ENGLISH, published by Nihon Bungeisha. The book uses his widely quoted sayings to teach English grammar.

Following sales of Ore ka, Ore igai ka. Roland toiu Ikikata which totaled over 370,000 within two years, a sequel volume titled Kimi ka, kimi igai ka. Kimi he okuru Roland no kotoba has been scheduled for release, also by Kadokawa, on July 8, 2021. An audiobook version, narrated by popular voice actor Junichi Suwabe and also published by Kadokawa, is scheduled for a November 14, 2022, release on Audible.

Currently, he is operating a hair removal salon and a restaurant. Additionally, he is active in beauty product sales and the champagne import agency business, while also working as an investor. ROLAND continues to pay rent for the building that was intended to be an expanded relocation site for his old host club; after the pandemic restrictions have decreased, he aims to reopen at the new location.

On September 17, 2021, BELLA NOTTE, an Italian restaurant was opened by him in Shinjuku. However, some customers at one table experienced a delay in receiving their order which took over 60 minutes. In November 2021, a second location was opened in Hachioji, in the location that had been tapioca shop THE PEARL, as well as the Roland Museum. Some of the museum exhibits, including his boots and bust statue, remain as decor.

On April 15, 2022, he debuted a new fashion brand, Minimus.

In May 2022, he became the first mizu shōbai worker to make an official appearance with Sanrio character My Melody, as the two presented advice in response to questions in collaboration with An An.

He was a featured guest at IT Trend Expo 2022 Summer, which took place from September 5 to 9, 2022, giving a talk titled 白い目で見られても気にしない！～白は何色にでも染められる～.

From March 7, 2023, he presented an online course on "The Philosophy of Confidence", via Taiwan's PressPlay Academy, stating that this year, he intends to expand his efforts internationally.

On March 24, 2023, he was presented as the official ambassador for 9Lives, a Chilean wine brand to be released by Asahi Beer in Japan from March 28.

== Trivia/Episodes ==
- His name is derived from the character Roland Himuro, from the Usamaru Furuya manga Teiichi: Battle of Supreme High.
- Roland's fans are called Rolanders.
- He declared himself that his reason for changing from Makoto Tojo to ROLAND was for the sake of changing his branding. On his own YouTube channel, THE ROLAND SHOW, he stated (of his time as Makoto Tojo), "There were many times I was unable to make girls happy. That started to make me feel upset, why do I keep doing things to make girls cry? [As a result,] I grew out of the business style of thinking that women are money", he cites as his reason for the change.
- A book collection of quotations from his posts on SNS and various media, Ore ka, Ore Igai ka. Roland Toiu Ikikata became a hit best-seller with over 230,000 copies in circulation. All of the royalties are being donated to the establishment of schools in Cambodia. In regards to this, he says that one doesn't have to be selfish to make sharp remarks and have them be heard by others.
- While he was an underling, he lived in a single-room apartment in Nishi-Shinjuku which he rented for 60 thousand yen per month and rode a bicycle to work. Afterwards, he would stay in hotels that cost 200,000 yen per night. Currently, he lives in a Roppongi high-rise apartment.
- According to his SNS, his friendships include Asashōryū Akinori, Tetsuya Komuro, Max Matsuura, Gen Shoji (of Gamba Osaka), Yuki Kobayashi (of Japan national football team), Tetsuya of L'Arc-en-Ciel, and Minami Takahashi, among others. Additionally, the musician Gackt has said that he adores Roland as if he were his younger brother.
- Baseball pitcher Yasuaki Yamasaki was his classmate at Teikyo High School, sharing a class with him for three years.
- Actresses Rika Adachi and Rina Ikoma visited Roland's exhibition Rina Ikoma said that she became a fan of him.
- His family consists of five people: his parents, a younger twin sister, and a brother 6 years younger than him. His father is professional guitarist Youichi Matsuo, who made accomplishments working with AIRBLANCA, JAM Project, Yukari Tamura, Ichiro Mizuki, and Mitsuko Horie, among others.
- In October 2021, a series of acrylic stands, coasters, and key holders were released as a collaboration between ROLAND and Haruhi Suzumiya in commemoration of the release of his book Kimi ka, kimi igai ka.

=== Soccer Affiliations ===
- From elementary school until high school, he was very focused on soccer; in middle school, he was in the J.League team Kashiwa Reysol junior youth's Ōme branch; in high school, he joined the Teikyo High School Soccer Team. He still continues to participate in soccer, and plays Futsal once a week with his host associates.
- On October 23, 2018, TV Asahi Keiretsu broadcast Sono Saki showed Roland going to see Real Madrid CF players Luka Modrić, Luís Figo, and Roberto Carlos.
- On October 6, 2019, before the J.League J1 League Cerezo Osaka vs Kashima Antlers 28th match at Yanmar Stadium Nagai, Roland appeared as the main guest at a talk event, holding a talk show with Cerezo's FW Ken Tokura, whom had been withdrawn due to injury. Additionally on that day, he was a referee escort. He also updated his blog on that day, saying "Despite acknowledging the many risks, I had many from the J.League Club bravely reach out to me and make this a reality, for which I am incredibly happy", expressing thanks for Cerezo and declaring, "From this day forward, I am a Cerezo Osaka supporter!"
- On February 22, 2020, he once again appeared in the talk event for the J1 opening round Cerezo Osaka vs Oita Trinita match at Yanmar Stadium Nagai. Preceding this event, on February 20, it was announced on Cerezo's official home page that he was inaugurated as an "Official CereMan". On that day, in addition to the talk event, he also worked as referee escort like during the previous event. Additionally, an inauguration was held during the halftime show, where president Hiroaki Morishima officially appointed Roland as Official CereMan. When greeted afterwards, he promised lifelong loyalty to Cerezo, declaring, "There are only two types of soccer clubs in the world. Is it Cerezo, or is it the rest?", which Cerezo supporters accepted with wild cheers. His contract was renewed for the 2021 season.
- His opportunities to appear in soccer-related events and media such as the above cases increased; he appeared as a guest commentator in the sub-audio of the TV terrestrial broadcast of the J.League YBC Levain Cup final match (Kawasaki Frontale vs Hokkaido Consadole Sapporo) held on October 26, 2019. On December 8 of the same year, at the J.League Awards 2019, he appeared as a presenter for the Winning Director Award.

== Businesses Operated ==
ROLAND GROUP HD, Incorporated

- THE CLUB (host club) (Closed on July 9, 2020; slated to reopen in July 2022)
- ROLAND MUSEUM (a renewal of Tapioca tea shop THE PEARL) As of November 2021, this location has been converted to a second location of BELLA NOTTE Italian restaurant, with some museum exhibits remaining on display.
- PARIS ROLAND Omotesando (Beauty salon)
- ROLAND Beauty Lounge (Men's hair removal salon)
- ROLANDALE (Beauty products, supplements, cosmetics)
- CHRISTIAN ROLAND (Apparel brand)
- R-GALLERY (High-end flower brand)
- SCHWARZ (Entertainment production)
- BELLA NOTTE (Italian restaurant)

== Appearances ==
=== TV Programs ===
- Kingen Picks~Tsuginaru Kigyouka ni, Chie wo Sazukeru (October 4, 2020, TBS) - Host (TV host/MC)
- Roland-sensei ~Ichiryu Ningenryoku Test~ (April 20, 2020, Fuji TV) - Himself
- Konna Denwa ga Kakattekimashita こんな電話がかかってきました (March 18, 2022, TV Asahi) - Himself
- Risqué Business Season 1 Episode 5: Kabukicho, Hosts, and ROLAND (April 25, 2023, Netflix) - Himself

=== TV Drama ===
- Aibou Season 15 Episode 3（October 26, 2016, TV Asahi） - Host
- Detective Story (2018 TV Drama Version) (April 8, 2018, TV Asahi)

=== Commercials ===
- NIKEN=ナイケン（YAMAHA）
- Suntory Oolong tea
- CHINTAI (2020 - )
- Gerolsteiner (March 2020 - )
- Medical Corporation Yushinkai Clear Dentistry (December 2020 - )

=== Music videos ===
- Sandaime J Soul Brothers from EXILE TRIBE "Rat-tat-tat" (2020)

=== Other ===
- FABULOUS NIGHT (2020, 2021) - Official Fabulous Ambassador

== Books ==
- Ore ka, Ore Igai ka. Roland Toiu Ikikata (俺か、俺以外か。 ローランドという生き方) (Kadokawa, March 11, 2019) ISBN 9784046041371
- Ore ka, Ore Igai ka. Roland Toiu Ikikata (俺か、俺以外か。 ローランドという生き方) (self-narrated audiobook published by Kadokawa via Audible, December 13, 2019)
- Roland Zero (ローランド・ゼロ) (Noriyuki Inoue, Takarajimasha, December 18, 2020) ISBN 4-299-01021-3/ISBN 978-4-299-01021-6
- Roland Zero Gyakushū-hen (ローランド・ゼロ 逆襲篇) (Noriyuki Inoue, Takarajimasha, May 27, 2021) ISBN 4-299-01445-6/ISBN 978-4-299-01445-0
- Roland-sensei -Onayami Kaiketsu Tokubetsu Jugyou- (ローランド先生—お悩み解決特別授業—) (Fusosha Publishing, August 22, 2020) ISBN 4594085768
- ROLAND ENGLISH (Nihon Bungeisha, April 21, 2021) ISBN 453721886X
- Kimi ka, Kimi igai ka. Kimi he okuru Roland no kotoba (君か、君以外か。 君へ贈るローランドの言葉) (Kadokawa, July 8, 2021) ISBN 4046049510
- Kimi ka, Kimi igai ka. Kimi he okuru Roland no kotoba (君か、君以外か。 君へ贈るローランドの言葉) (audiobook version narrated by Junichi Suwabe, published by Kadokawa via Audible, November 14, 2022)
