= Attack on Titan season 4 =

Final season of the anime television series (2020–23)

Attack on Titan
- Season 4
- No. of episodes: 35 + 2 specials (Note: Episodes 88–94 (season 4, episodes 29–35) originally aired as two TV specials which premiered on March 4 and November 5, 2023. Additionally, this aforementioned episodic version, which launched on Japanese streaming services, has not been officially released internationally.)

Release
- Original network: NHK General TV
- Original release: December 7, 2020 – November 5, 2023

Season chronology
- ← Previous; Season 3

The fourth and final season of the Attack on Titan anime television series, titled Attack on Titan: The Final Season, (Note: Usually titled as Attack on Titan: Final Season in promotional material used by Crunchyroll, with "The" being omitted) was produced by MAPPA, chief directed by Jun Shishido, and directed by Yuichiro Hayashi, replacing Tetsurō Araki and Masashi Koizuka, respectively. Scriptwriter Hiroshi Seko fully took over the series composition from Yasuko Kobayashi, and Tomohiro Kishi replaced Kyōji Asano as character designer due to the series switching production studios. The season covers the "Marley" (chapters 91–106) and "War for Paradis" (chapters 107–139) arcs from the original manga by Hajime Isayama.

The season begins through a lens of war and introduces Gabi Braun and Falco Grice, young Eldian Warrior candidates seeking to inherit Reiner's Armored Titan four years after the failed mission to reclaim the Founding Titan. While Marley plans to invade Paradis to strengthen their weakening military and retrieve the Founding Titan, the Survey Corps lay an attack in their homeland. As Marley and the Paradis forces go to war in Marley and the Shiganshina District, both sides sustain a heavy death toll while Gabi and Falco are forced to confront their internal tensions about the supposed "devils" of Paradis. In the second part of the season, aware of the global anti-Eldian sentiment resulting from Marleyan propaganda, Eren Jaeger preemptively targets the world outside of Paradis with the Rumbling, unleashing millions of Colossal-like Wall Titans in a widespread effort to kill all life beyond the island. In the third and fourth parts of the season, the Alliance led by members of the Survey Corps and Warrior Unit head to Marley in order to stop Eren's Founding Titan and end the Rumbling.

The first part of the season aired on NHK General TV from December 7, 2020, to March 29, 2021, at 12:10 a.m. JST. In the United States, Adult Swim's Toonami programming block began airing then-Funimation's English dub on January 10, 2021, at 12:30 a.m. EST/PST. In Southeast Asia, the subbed series was released on iQIYI. A second part aired on NHK General TV from January 10 to April 4, 2022, at 12:05 a.m. JST. The third and fourth parts initially aired as two television specials, both titled as The Final Chapters; the first special premiered on March 4, 2023, at 12:25 a.m. JST while the second special premiered on November 5, 2023, at midnight JST. After the broadcast of the second special, an individual TV episode size version of both parts was distributed on multiple streaming services. Episodes 88–90 which compile the first special began streaming on November 5, 2023, while episodes 91–94 which compile the second special began streaming on November 19, 2023.

The score is directed by Masafumi Mima and composed by Hiroyuki Sawano and Kohta Yamamoto. For Part 1, the opening theme is "Boku no Sensō" (僕の戦争; lit. 'My War') performed by Shinsei Kamattechan, and the ending theme is "Shōgeki" (衝撃; lit. 'Shock') performed by Yūko Andō. For Part 2, the opening theme is "The Rumbling" performed by SiM, and the ending theme is "Akuma no Ko" (悪魔の子; lit. 'A Child of Evil') performed by Ai Higuchi. For the first half of The Final Chapters, the ending theme is "Under the Tree" performed by SiM. For the second half of The Final Chapters, the ending theme is "To You 2,000... or... 20,000 Years From Now..." (二千年... 若しくは... 二万年後の君へ・・・, Ni-sen Nen... Moshiku wa... Ni-man Nen-go no Kimi e...) performed by Linked Horizon. For the individual TV episode size version of parts 3 and 4, the opening theme is "Saigo no Kyojin" (最後の巨人; lit. 'The Last Titan') performed by Linked Horizon, while the ending theme is "Itterasshai" (いってらっしゃい; lit. 'See You Later') performed by Ai Higuchi.

== Episodes ==
No. overall	No. in season	Title	Directed by	Storyboarded by	Original release date	English air date
Part 1
60	1	"The Other Side of the Sea"; Transliteration: "Umi no Mukōgawa" (Japanese: 海の向こう側)	Kaori Makita	Jun Shishido	December 7, 2020	January 10, 2021
Four years after the Warrior Unit's defeat on Paradis Island, Marley is at war against the Mid-East Allied Forces. As a result, the operation to reclaim the Founding Titan was put on hold. In the final battle at the Allied Forces' base, Fort Slava, Marley sends Eldian soldiers, including child Warrior Candidates (candidates to inherit the power of the Nine Titans after the current ones 13-year term is up) Falco Grice, his older brother Colt, Reiner's cousin Gabi Braun, Udo, and Zofia. The Allied Forces' armored train contains a deadly anti-Titan cannon. Gabi manages to disable the train with hand grenades. This allows Pieck's Cart Titan and Galliard's Jaw Titan to attack. From an airship, Eldians are transformed into Pure Titans by Zeke using his scream, and they, with Reiner's Armored Titan, destroy the fort. Zeke's Beast Titan annihilates the Mid-East Allied Fleet, ending the four-year war with Marley victorious. However, after witnessing the improved anti-Titan weaponry other nations are developing to combat them, Marley realizes they must resume the operation to retrieve the Founding Titan.
61	2	"Midnight Train"; Transliteration: "Yamiyo no Ressha" (Japanese: 闇夜の列車)	Daisuke Tokudo	Daisuke Tokudo	December 14, 2020	January 17, 2021
At a Marleyan military meeting, Zeke proposes to use his last year of life to attack Paradis Island and retake the Founding Titan. However, as none of Marley's scout ships sent to Paradis have returned for the past three years, it is clear that Paradis controls at least two of the Nine Titans. On a train back home, Reiner encourages Falco to become the Armored Titan in place of Gabi to save her from the 13-year life limit. The Eldian soldiers and Warriors arrive home in Liberio, the Eldian internment zone, and reunite with their families. At dinner, Reiner puzzles Gabi when he describes the supposed devil island of Paradis as having "all sorts of people". Zeke informs the Warriors of his plan to use the Tybur noble family and their War Hammer Titan to declare war against Paradis so Marley can retake the Founding Titan and continue colonizing nations.
62	3	"The Door of Hope"; Transliteration: "Kibō no Tobira" (Japanese: 希望の扉)	Kōki Aoshima & Hiromi Nishiyama	Hiromi Nishiyama & Yuichiro Hayashi	December 21, 2020	January 24, 2021
Reiner thinks back to the curse of being an Eldian. He had resolved to unite his Eldian mother and Marleyan father by entering the military training program where Eldian child Candidates are chosen to become Titans for Marley, which earns them the status of Honorary Marleyans. Reiner's father, however, rejected him on account of him being Eldian. Four years ago, Commander Theo Magath had sent then-teenagers Annie Leonhart, Bertholdt Hoover, Marcel Galliard and Reiner on a mission to Paradis to reclaim the Founding Titan. Marcel was devoured by Ymir's Pure Titan. Following their assault on Wall Maria, the remaining three joined the 104th Training Corps two years later, befriending Eren and the others, and seeking information about the Founding Titan. Reiner ultimately decided to destroy Wall Rose. In the present, a depressed Reiner attempts suicide, but urges himself to live for Falco and the other child Candidates. Falco stops by the hospital and speaks with a traumatized Eldian soldier, who admits to faking amnesia to avoid being sent back home.
63	4	"From One Hand to Another"; Transliteration: "Te kara Te e" (Japanese: 手から手へ)	Tetsuaki Matsuda	Yukio Nishimoto & Yuichiro Hayashi	December 28, 2020	January 31, 2021
Kruger, the traumatized and disabled Eldian soldier, asks Falco to post letters for him from outside the internment zone. Willy Tybur, the head of the Tybur family who possesses the War Hammer Titan, forms an alliance with Commander Magath to stop the warmongering and restore the balance between Eldia and Marley. At the hospital, patient Mr. Jaeger, Grisha's father, and Eren's grandfather, tells Kruger to stop making Falco do favors for him because Falco and his family might get in trouble with Marley, before breaking down, blaming himself for Faye's death. Willy invites the dignitaries to a theatrical play to be performed after the festival in Liberio. In a post-credits scene, before the play, Falco brings Reiner to a basement behind the stage to meet Kruger as per Kruger's request. Shaken, Reiner immediately recognizes him as Eren Jaeger.
64	5	"Declaration of War"; Transliteration: "Sensen Fukoku" (Japanese: 宣戦布告)	Teruyuki Ōmine	Manjiro Oshio	January 11, 2021	February 7, 2021
In a theatrical presentation, Willy tells the well-known story of Marley's hero Helos, who defeated the Eldian King Fritz, securing peace for Marley at the price of Eldians' freedom. Willy then reveals it was King Fritz himself who ended the Great Titan War by fabricating the Helos myth, as he longed for peace. Believing Eldians were sinners, Fritz moved hundreds of Eldians to Paradis, built the Walls, and passed his ideology down in his bloodline via his oath, keeping his successors bound to his renouncement of war, unable to use the Founding Titan. Fritz warned he'd release the millions of Colossal Titans in the Walls – a violent "Rumbling" that would end humanity – if Marley threatened them. Willy announces that the Founding Titan was stolen by Eren Jaeger, making him a threat to world peace as he is not bound by Fritz's oath, not being of Fritz' bloodline. In the basement, Eren tells Reiner that he infiltrated Marley to save his home and realized that Paradis and Marley are alike in that both sides are just people. Reiner breaks down, devastated about what he caused on Paradis four years prior. As Willy declares war on the Eldians of Paradis, Eren transforms into the Attack Titan, throwing Willy's mangled body into the air.
65	6	"The War Hammer Titan"; Transliteration: "Sentsui no Kyojin" (Japanese: 戦鎚の巨人)	Cao Yi (Note: Cao Yi's name in Japanese is "Atsushi Tsukasa") & Takahiro Kaneko	Jun Shishido	January 18, 2021	February 14, 2021
In a flashback, Willy discusses with Commander Magath the probability of an attack on him during the play, although he is prepared to become a martyr in support of his cause, believing all Eldians to be devils. In the present, Eren devours Willy and rampages, devastating the Marleyan military brass. Zofia and Udo die in the chaos, traumatizing Gabi. Willy's sister Lara Tybur transforms into the War Hammer Titan and overpowers Eren using her Titan's hardening ability. The Survey Corps arrive to give Eren backup, battling Marley's soldiers. Just as the War Hammer Titan prepares to kill Eren, Mikasa Ackerman attacks with developed Thunder Spears. Eren realizes that Lara's crystal-encased body is underground, connected by a long cord. He severs the cord but Porco's Jaw Titan attacks him. Levi Ackerman flies in just in time to slice the Jaw Titan's jaw joint, saving Eren and shocking Porco.
66	7	"Assault"; Transliteration: "Kyōshū" (Japanese: 強襲)	Jun Shishido	Jun Shishido & Yuichiro Hayashi	January 25, 2021	February 21, 2021
The Scouts come under attack from Pieck's Cart Titan carrying the Panzer Unit armed with machine guns. Zeke's Beast Titan arrives as Marleyan soldiers surround Liberio. Falco, who was protected from Eren by Reiner's partial transformation, reunites with Magath and Gabi. Eren transforms for the third time to escape the War Hammer's trap. Armin Arlert transforms into the Colossal Titan, destroying the Marleyan Navy and the port. Levi incapacitates the Beast Titan, dropping a grenade on his nape. Sasha, Jean and the others incapacitate Pieck and her Cart Titan. Hange arrives overhead in an airship to retrieve Eren and the Scouts. The Jaw Titan is dismembered by Mikasa and Eren, who has realized that while he can't break Lara's crystal, the Jaw Titan's powerful jaws can. He utilizes the Jaw Titan to shatter Lara's crystal and swallows her, gaining the powers of the War Hammer Titan. As Porco too is about to be eaten, Reiner reluctantly emerges as the Armored Titan to fight Eren.
67	8	"Assassin's Bullet"; Transliteration: "Kyōdan" (Japanese: 凶弾)	Hidetoshi Takahashi, Lie Jun Yang & Yōsuke Yamamoto	Jiro Kanai & Jun Shishido	February 1, 2021	February 28, 2021
Reiner does not battle Eren, focusing on protecting Porco. Eren escapes with Mikasa. Levi arrests Eren for infiltrating Marley on his own and forcing the Scouts to rescue him; at this point, Eren has all but ensured that the world will launch an attack on Paradis in response to his rampage. Gabi climbs aboard the airship with a rifle, chased by Falco, who has realized from Eren and Reiner that Paradis is simply responding to the devastation Marley caused them first by sending the Armored, Colossal, and Female Titan to the island. Gabi shoots Sasha. Pieck tells Magath that the soldier who had trapped her and Porco was Yelena, a member of the first scout ship sent to Paradis that went missing three years prior. Gabi and Falco are shocked to see Zeke, who appears to have switched sides. Zeke remarks on the success of bringing the Founder (Eren) and a Titan of royal blood (Zeke) together. Sasha dies, leaving the Scouts distraught. Jean reminds Eren that she would have lived if Eren had not involved the Scouts in this.
68	9	"Brave Volunteers"; Transliteration: "Giyūhei" (Japanese: 義勇兵)	Kōki Aoshima	Hiromi Nishiyama & Yuichiro Hayashi	February 8, 2021	March 14, 2021 (Note: Episode 68 was originally set to air on Adult Swim on March 7, 2021, however the February 2021 North American ice storm that hit Texas which resulted in a shutdown of its power grid caused production delays for Funimation's English dub. Adult Swim showed a rerun of the prior week's episode in its place.)
Three years prior to Eren's raid in Liberio against Marley, the Scouts had captured the first Marleyan scout ship that came to Paradis. Crew-members Yelena, Onyankopon, and other Marleyan-conscripted deserters, called the "Anti-Marleyan Volunteers" after Marley destroyed their home nations in war, offered help, backing Zeke's plan to carry out the Rumbling in order to beat Marley. Over the next three years, they provided the Scouts the technology and knowledge of Marleyan guns and weaponry, helping them upgrade their own gear. The Scouts capture more Marleyan scout ships and recruit the Marleyan soldiers as labor to build docks for the island. In the present, the Scouts grieve Sasha, including Marleyan captive Nicolo, a chef who cooks for the Scouts. Commander Pyxis has the Anti-Marleyan Volunteers detained after the raid in suspicion. Armin reflects to the crystallized Annie on whether helping Eren in the raid was the right decision as war has now become inevitable, but acknowledges that they had no choice, as Marley would've otherwise attacked and beaten Paradis with their stronger forces. Gabi, Falco, and Eren are all imprisoned.
69	10	"A Sound Argument"; Transliteration: "Seiron" (Japanese: 正論)	Kaori Makita	Toshiya Niidome & Yuichiro Hayashi	February 15, 2021	March 21, 2021
Two years ago on Zeke's advice, a special envoy of Hizuru, Kiyomi Azumabito, landed on the newly-completed docks of Paradis Island for negotiations. A tattoo on Mikasa's arm revealed that she is the descendant of Hizuru's ruling shogun. Lady Azumabito believed that Hizuru could help Paradis achieve Zeke's plan to use the Rumbling to protect the island, in return for the valuable Iceburst Stone – the mysterious Paradis substance and resource that powers ODM gear. She listed Zeke's propositions: to enact a test of the Rumbling, to strengthen and modernize the Paradis military, and for the Beast Titan to be passed down to someone of royal blood who would bear children, so it could be passed on every 13 years. Historia agreed to inherit the Beast Titan, though Eren vehemently rejected. However, Hizuru's help was rooted in greed, and a year later, they would not help Paradis negotiate trade with other nations, wanting to monopolize Paradis' resources. At that time, while working on the island's new railway, the Scouts were struggling with deciding on a strategy against Marley and the successor of Eren's Titan when his 13-year term ran out. In the present, Hange interrogates Eren for acting on his own but Eren reacts violently to her. Historia is shown to be pregnant and living with a farmer she knew from childhood. Jean and Connie believe Eren has gone rogue; Armin and Mikasa want to speak to Eren together to figure out his goals, and Armin proposes that the military could have Eren eaten by someone more trustworthy, especially since they have the Titan serum.
70	11	"Deceiver"; Transliteration: "Itsuwari Mono" (Japanese: 偽り者)	Teruyuki Ōmine	Teruyuki Ōmine	February 22, 2021	March 28, 2021
Gabi kills her prison guard and escapes with Falco into the wilderness. They are found by a young girl named Kaya, who offers food and shelter at the Braus stables; Sasha's family. Lady Azumabito arrives with a Hizuru delegation and an aircraft powered by Iceburst Stone, which she describes as the "world's first flying boat". For leaking information about Eren's imprisonment to the press, Hange incarcerates four Survey Corps members including Floch and Louise. At the Braus stables, Kaya reveals that she knows Gabi and Falco are from Marley. She explains how her village was destroyed and her mother was eaten alive by a Titan four years ago, and questions why they should die for sins committed by Eldians hundreds of years ago; while Falco is understanding, Gabi remains hostile. Kaya informs them that they will be having dinner at Nicolo's restaurant, and as he is a Marleyan, he might be able to help Gabi and Falco return home. In a post-credits scene, the Marleyan military has realized that Zeke faked his death and sided with Paradis. As the new General, Magath informs the Warriors that in six months' time, the world plans to launch a global offensive against Paradis, but Reiner suggests they make a surprise attack right now before Zeke can come up with a defensive plan.
71	12	"Guides"; Transliteration: "Michibiku Mono" (Japanese: 導く者)	Kunihiro Mori	Akira Oguro & Yuichiro Hayashi	March 1, 2021	April 4, 2021
Armin is with Annie's crystal again and Hitch accuses him of having a crush. They see that the Paradis military has lost public trust and protests have begun over Eren's imprisonment. Yelena reveals to Commander Pyxis that ten months ago, she had secretly met with Eren before his infiltration of Marley. Onyankopon tells Hange how Yelena was fiercely loyal to Zeke in Marley. Mikasa and Armin meet with Premier Zachary to get permission to speak with Eren. Zachary denies them as he suspects Eren is being manipulated by Zeke. Right after they leave his office, a bomb kills Zachary and three other soldiers, which stirs up the protesters eager to fight for a New Eldian Empire. Eren escapes from prison and is met by Floch and the other allies who side with him. In the aftermath, the Military Police concede to the Survey Corps that their secret intentions were to take Eren's Founding Titan without informing the Survey Corps, causing the protestors to act out more. Hange states that Eren's supporters, dubbed the "Jaegerists", intend to reunite Eren and Zeke and reform the military with Eren as the leader. Pyxis, attempting to prevent infighting, suggests the military should make a deal with the Jaegerists using Zeke's location as a bargaining chip. Hange suspects Yelena and Zeke, and urges the Survey Corps to look into the Marleyan prisoners who obtained jobs through Yelena. The Braus family, along with Gabi and Falco, arrive at Nicolo's restaurant while Pieck is shown to have infiltrated Paradis.
72	13	"Children of the Forest"; Transliteration: "Mori no Kora" (Japanese: 森の子ら)	Yasuhiro Geshi & Kōnosuke Uda	Yuzo Sato & Yuichiro Hayashi	March 8, 2021	April 11, 2021
In the forest, Zeke recounts to Levi that four years earlier, on Marley's orders, his spinal fluid was released in a gaseous form on the Ragako villagers on Paradis, where Connie's mother was from. It paralyzed them, and then Zeke turned them into Titans with his scream. Zeke claims he did it to maintain his cover, but Levi accuses him of not truly caring for the people he killed. In the restaurant, Kaya points Nicolo out to Gabi and Falco as the Marleyan who invited them, explaining that he was probably in love with Sasha. As the Survey Corps arrive to question him, Nicolo forcefully takes a bottle of Marleyan wine from Connie and Jean. He brings the wine to the cellar, where Gabi and Falco follow him, revealing themselves as Warrior Candidates. Nicolo deduces that Gabi killed Sasha and attempts to bludgeon her with the bottle, but Falco takes the hit, and some of the wine gets in his mouth. Nicolo punches Gabi out then carries both back to the dining room. He offers Mr. Braus a knife, saying either of them shall kill Gabi. The Survey Corps intervenes, and through Mr. Braus, the emotions are calmed. Connie and Jean restrain Nicolo, but Mikasa has to save Gabi from a furious Kaya. Gabi is escorted to another room by Mikasa and Armin, while Nicolo tells Hange to rinse Falco's mouth as he suspects the wine is tainted with Zeke's spinal fluid. He explains that the wine came from Yelena's scout ship, and was to be served to high government officials. Meanwhile, Levi receives word of Zachary's death and wonders if he miscalculated Eren's potential as humanity's savior. The Jaegerists raid the restaurant and hold everyone at gunpoint. Floch demands Zeke's location from Hange and reveals he knew about Zeke's plan with the wine. Eren meets with Mikasa, Armin and Gabi and states that he wants to talk.
73	14	"Savagery"; Transliteration: "Bōaku" (Japanese: 暴悪)	Jun Shishido	Kazuyoshi Katayama	March 22, 2021 (Note: While airing its premiere on NHK General TV on March 15, 2021, episode 73 was halted due to a special report about an earthquake that occurred in the Wakayama Prefecture. It reaired in its complete format a week later on March 22 alongside episode 74.)	April 18, 2021
At their round-table discussion, Eren claims he is acting on his own free will. As each Titan host is affected by the memories of its previous owner, Eren asserts that Armin is being manipulated into visiting Annie's crystal by Bertholdt's memories. Eren then reveals that Mikasa, through her Ackermann bloodline, has been programmed to protect Eldia's Kings, but she also accepted Eren as her host. He claims she is no more than a slave, for which he had hated her since childhood. Enraged, Armin attacks Eren, although he's first unwillingly stopped by Mikasa. Eren repeats that it is due to Mikasa's lineage. Armin punches Eren in the face, but Eren beats him easily, and insults him. Everyone in the restaurant except for Hange is taken to Shiganshina District by the Jaegerists where Eren plans to rejoin Zeke. In the forest, Levi plans to have Zeke eaten by a Jaegerist to prevent Eren from using the Founding Titan. Zeke runs from the camp and screams, turning Levi's comrades into Pure Titans due to the tainted wine they had drunk. Levi kills all the Titans and pursues Zeke, who transforms into the Beast Titan; using Thunder Spears, Levi recaptures Zeke. Floch turns the military cadets in Shiganshina to the Jaegerists' side by threatening them with imprisonment, forcing them to beat Commandant Keith Shadis. Zeke wakes up to find himself lying gravely injured in a cart, with Levi sitting beside him. He's informed by Levi that a Thunder Spear is impaled into his stomach, tied to the detonator around his neck. Levi starts chopping Zeke's legs; as Zeke screams in agony, he recalls a memory of his childhood.
74	15	"Sole Salvation"; Transliteration: "Yuiitsu no Sukui" (Japanese: 唯一の救い)	Mitsue Yamazaki	Masayuki Miyaji	March 22, 2021	April 25, 2021
As a child, Zeke was treated harshly by his parents, as Dina Fritz and Grisha saw him as a tool in their plans to restore Eldian society and overthrow Marley. One day, Zeke encountered Tom Xaver, the current holder of the Beast Titan, and over the years, they developed a close bond. Xaver eventually revealed to Zeke that he had managed to conceal his Eldian heritage when he was young and created a family for himself. However, when he revealed to his wife that he was an Eldian, she killed their son before committing suicide. When Zeke learned that his parents were Restorationists, he turned them over to the police at the urging of Xaver and to save himself from being turned into a Pure Titan. Zeke also realized that this was the best way for him to get into the Marleyan Military. Xaver told Zeke that his research revealed that the Founding Titan is able to manipulate the body of Eldians. They resolved to "save" the Eldian people from further persecution through sterilizing them using the Founding Titan. Later, Xaver also revealed how to get around King Fritz's vow renouncing war. Eventually, Zeke inherited the Beast Titan and promised to find a suitable person for their plan. After reuniting with Reiner and Bertholdt on Paradis, he learned that Eren Jaeger possessed the Founder. He deduced that Grisha Jaeger had managed to escape his punishment and vowed to rescue Eren from Grisha's brainwashing. In Liberio, Eren agreed to cooperate with Zeke's euthanization plan. As Zeke finishes reflecting on his past, his mumbling is heard by Levi. Zeke suddenly ignites the Thunder Spear impaled in his body, detonating it and catching himself and Levi in the explosion.
75	16	"Above and Below"; Transliteration: "Tenchi" (Japanese: 天地)	Teruyuki Ōmine, Tomoko Hiramuki, Jun Shishido, Mitsue Yamazaki & Yuichiro Hayashi	Yūki Itō	March 29, 2021	May 2, 2021
Hange, Floch and a group of Jaegerists are heading towards the forest to find Zeke when they hear the explosion of the Thunder Spear and go to investigate. A female Pure Titan approaches the dying Zeke, tears open her abdomen and places him inside. At Shiganshina, Yelena and the Volunteers have Commander Pyxis and other military members rounded up since many among them drank from the tainted wine. The imprisoned Survey Corps members discuss escaping and Eren's recent actions when Yelena arrives to explain to them Zeke's true plan: a widespread Eldian sterilization to prevent the births of any more Eldians until the death of Historia's child, after which humanity will be free from the threat of Titans. In the meantime, they will use the threat of the Rumbling to prevent interference from other nations. Eren meets Gabi, ordering her to cooperate with him but is interrupted by Pieck who surprisingly offers to join the Jaegerists. She states that the Marleyans must be punished for their poor treatment of the Eldian people and agrees to sell out her compatriots. On the rooftop, Pieck's ruse is revealed as Porco's Jaw Titan emerges from below and attempts to eat Eren. Eren transforms into the Attack Titan, revealing his location to approaching Marleyan airships. General Magath orders his men to get revenge for Liberio, and Eren prepares to face Reiner once again.
Part 2
76	17	"Judgment"; Transliteration: "Danzai" (Japanese: 断罪)	Yuichiro Hayashi	Kazuyoshi Katayama	January 10, 2022	February 13, 2022
Hange and the Jaegerists discover Levi's body and find Zeke as he emerges from the dying Pure Titan fully healed, which Hange uses as a distraction to escape with Levi. Zeke explains to Floch that his massive wounds were treated by a mysterious girl in the mystical place called the Paths. Meanwhile at Shiganshina, Marleyan soldiers descend from their airships, and Pieck and Gabi reunite with Magath and Colt. Deducing from Zeke's words recited by Gabi, their objective is to not let Eren and Zeke make physical contact. Reiner and Porco battle Eren, but he overwhelms them using the War Hammer's power. The tide turns when Magath fires a new anti-Titan cannon at Eren from the Cart Titan's back on Wall Maria, incapacitating him and giving Reiner the chance to gain the upper hand. The Jaegerist soldiers suffer heavy losses from the Marleyan forces. In desperation, Onyankopon releases the imprisoned Survey Corps members along with Nicolo and the Braus family and asks for their help to defeat the Warriors. He convinces them that he was not part of the euthanization plan, but they debate whether they should help Eren and Zeke, possibly the only ones who can protect Paradis Island. Armin suggests that Eren lied to Mikasa and that he's just playing along with Zeke and Yelena, but the response is silence.
77	18	"Sneak Attack"; Transliteration: "Damashi Uchi" (Japanese: 騙し討ち)	Jun Shishido	Yuichiro Hayashi & Akiko Kudō	January 17, 2022	February 20, 2022
The freed Survey Corps eventually decide to help Eren, though Mikasa expresses her doubts about Eren's true motives. Meanwhile, the vicious battle of Eren against Reiner and Porco continues, with the Armored Titan eventually pinning down the Attack Titan, preparing to eat Eren. Suddenly, Zeke appears as the Beast Titan on top of Wall Maria and begins to attack the Marleyan airships, soldiers and Warriors. The Survey Corps force the Jaegerists to free Commandant Shadis and the jailed members of the Military Police and Garrison Regiment. Commander Pyxis offers to lead a group of soldiers who have drunk from the wine tainted with Zeke's spinal fluid to fend off the invaders. In preparation, Mikasa puts her scarf down, witnessed by a joyful Louise. Nile reunites Falco with Gabi and Colt who is armed with an anti-Titan rifle. In hiding, Gabi overhears the Braus family's words and finally realizes that there are no devils on the island, just people. Falco confesses his feelings for her, afraid that he could turn into a Titan any moment. This prompts Colt to rush them to Zeke, hoping to stop him from screaming. Pieck fakes the death of the Cart Titan, enabling Magath to fire a shot at the Beast Titan's nape with the anti-Titan cannon, gravely wounding Zeke and knocking him off the wall. As the Attack Titan limps towards the fallen Beast Titan, Reiner is urged to stop Eren from coming into contact with Zeke.
78	19	"Two Brothers"; Transliteration: "Ani to Otōto" (Japanese: 兄と弟)	Teruyuki Ōmine	Yuichiro Hayashi	January 24, 2022	February 27, 2022
The Jaw Titan tries to slow the Attack Titan down, but Eren severely injures Porco by smashing the Jaw's nape. He's interrupted by another cannon shot, but then Floch's group attacks and distracts the Cart. Reiner grapples with Eren and reaches out to Porco, which triggers Marcel's memory about Reiner inheriting the Armored Titan. Zeke survived Magath's sneak attack and prepares to use his scream. Colt pleads with Zeke not to do so until Falco is out of range, but Zeke regretfully screams anyway, turning everyone who drank the tainted wine into Pure Titans, including Nile and Pyxis. Colt is incinerated by Falco's transformation. Zeke orders Falco to eat Reiner, but Falco instead devours Porco, who offers himself to be eaten while still believing he is a better man than Reiner. Floch's group is defeated and the Beast Titan is shot in the nape again, seemingly killing Zeke. Suddenly, the Survey Corps attack the Cart and Armored Titans with Thunder Spears, clearing a path for Eren to exit his Titan and reach Zeke, who faked his death the same way Pieck did. However, Gabi uses Colt's rifle to decapitate Eren, whose head falls into Zeke's hand. Eren's consciousness is immediately transported to the Paths, where he meets an aged Zeke in chains, a representation of King Fritz's vow renouncing war. When a young girl who is the soul of the Founder Ymir approaches from the Coordinate, Eren declares he never meant to follow Zeke's plan and attempts to control her, but Zeke reveals that Ymir only follows the orders of those of royal blood. Having nullified the vow renouncing war while in the Paths, Zeke sheds his chains and shackles Eren. In another attempt to convince Eren to follow his euthanization plan and "fix" him with the Founder's power, he touches their heads together.
79	20	"Memories of the Future"; Transliteration: "Mirai no Kioku" (Japanese: 未来の記憶)	Kōki Aoshima	Yuichiro Hayashi	January 31, 2022	March 6, 2022
Using the Paths, Zeke shows Eren his life from birth through their father Grisha's memories, hoping to convince Eren that Grisha has brainwashed him. However, they discover that Grisha had instead forsaken his Eldian nationalism and allowed Eren to find his own path in life. Eren tells Zeke that he was mistaken to assume that they were the same, as Eren preserved his freedom he was born with while Zeke is unable to move past Grisha's dream. Undaunted, Zeke states that with the power of the Founding Titan, he can still carry out the euthanization plan. In the memory when Grisha offered Eren to show him the secrets of their basement, he's revealed to be talking to Eren's future self. Zeke and Eren then arrive at the moment when Grisha confronts the Reiss family. As Grisha pleads with Frieda Reiss to save Paradis with the Founding Titan, he reveals that the Attack Titan's ability is that the host can see the memories of its future inheritors. When Frieda refuses to help and cites King Fritz's ideology about how the Eldian people shall accept the world's punishment, Grisha decides to kill the Reiss family and take the Founding Titan for himself. However, he hesitates and realizes that he cannot bring himself to kill, especially not children. Eren intervenes by using his memories of the future to communicate with Grisha, goading him into slaughtering the Reiss family and causing the events of the past to play out as they were meant to. After stealing the Founding Titan, Grisha breaks down and sees Zeke, telling him that it will be Eren's plan that will come to pass. Grisha then expresses his regret to Zeke for not being a better father to him, visibly moving Zeke. When Grisha pleads with him to stop Eren, he's suddenly knocked out from Grisha's memories and both are brought back to the Paths.
80	21	"From You, 2,000 Years Ago"; Transliteration: "Nisennen-mae no Kimi kara" (Japanese: 二千年前の君から)	Naoki Matsuura	Kazuyoshi Katayama & Yuichiro Hayashi	February 7, 2022	March 13, 2022
Returning from Grisha's memories, Zeke is horrified to learn that Eren purposely pushed Grisha to acquire the Founder and manipulated his past to ensure the future he had foreseen when touching Historia. Zeke commands Ymir to enact the euthanization plan, but Eren rips free from his chains to rush after Ymir as she advances toward the Coordinate. In a flashback to 2,000 years earlier, Ymir lived in a small rural village which was invaded by Eldians, led by Fritz, who enslaved the inhabitants. The young Ymir is blamed for letting a pig escape, and is hunted for sport as punishment. While she is being hunted down, she enters an ancient tree and falls into a deep pool where a parasitic-looking entity turns her into the first Titan. Still treating her as a slave, Fritz uses Ymir's Founding Titan to destroy Marley's armies and expand the kingdom of Eldia. During this time, Fritz has three daughters with Ymir: Maria, Rose, and Shina. One day, Ymir sacrifices herself to save Fritz from a dissenter; Fritz orders his children to eat her body so their descendants can keep passing on the power of the Titans. Ymir's soul is transported into the Paths, where she spends the next 2,000 years making Titans by hand. Back in the present, Eren reaches Ymir and offers her the freedom to choose her future for the first time in her existence. Ignoring Zeke as the one of royal blood, she decides her future lies with Eren. Consequently, the Rumbling begins as the Walls collapse and the thousands of Colossal-like Wall Titans encased within it are released. Pieck, Magath and Floch tumble from Wall Maria while Reiner rushes to save Gabi. Though Armin is relieved that Eren was not on Zeke's side, he realizes every Wall Titan on Paradis was released when only a small group would've been enough to take down the global alliance. Eren, having transformed into his version of the Founding Titan, uses the Paths to telepathically announce to all Subjects of Ymir of his intention to use the Rumbling to exterminate all life beyond the island.
81	22	"Thaw"; Transliteration: "Hyōkai" (Japanese: 氷解)	Hidekazu Hara & Tokio Igarashi	Jun Shishido	February 14, 2022	March 20, 2022
Eren and the Wall Titans march off to trample the world outside of Paradis. Reiner and Gabi search for Falco, who was presumably carried away by Jean and Connie. Reiner was wounded while protecting Gabi from falling debris, as his Titan's armor also disappeared at the start of the Rumbling. He regrets his failure over halting Eren and urges Gabi to escape and warn everyone, but she points out that Eren must be stopped. Reiner states he has already given up, so he's left behind in a house. The Pure Titans created by Zeke run amok in Shiganshina. Armin, Mikasa, Jean and Connie discuss Eren's actions and an unconscious Falco's fate; a Titan's sudden attack allows Connie to escape with the boy, planning to feed him to his mother to make her human again. In the Titan-filled streets, Gabi saves Kaya from Nile's Titan, with the Braus family and Nicolo protecting her from the Survey Corps, mending the rift between them. Armin, Mikasa, Jean, and Shadis rally the remaining Jaegerists and Cadets. The soldiers lure all the Pure Titans towards the fort in the center of the district where they work together to finish off their former comrades, with Armin killing Pyxis' Titan. The battle ends with all Pure Titans and Marleyan soldiers killed, although the thrilled Louise is injured. Onyankopon and Yelena are baffled to witness the Rumbling. Floch is revealed to be alive as he arrives with an intention to punish the Volunteers. Mr. Braus takes Armin and Mikasa to Gabi, who is horrified to learn of Connie's plan and pleads with Armin to convince Eren that not everyone outside the island has to die. Upon learning that the Armored Titan's hardening came undone at the same time as the beginning of the Rumbling, Armin deduces that Eren commanded all Titan hardening be undone, implying that Annie's crystal is now also undone.
82	23	"Sunset"; Transliteration: "Yūyake" (Japanese: 夕焼け)	Mitsue Yamazaki	Mitsue Yamazaki	February 21, 2022	March 27, 2022
As the Wall Titans walk off into the sunset, the people in Trost District argue about the cost in lives and devastation of Eren's strategy caused by the Rumbling. Hitch finds a weakened Annie who has been freed from her crystal and helps her escape from the Military Police. Annie tells Hitch that she no longer wants to fight and wishes to reunite with her adoptive father in Marley. Although he abused and brutally raised her to be a Warrior, he confessed regret at not treating her like a daughter. The Eldians in Liberio, led by Mr. Leonhart, try to convince the Marleyan guards about the impending Rumbling, but they refuse to listen, culminating in Leonhart picking up a fight. Back in Shiganshina, Shadis foresees the Jaegerists taking over the island. He expects himself to be purged, but advises the Cadets to follow them for now. Armin prepares to head out with Gabi to pursue Connie and Falco. He angrily chastises Mikasa for worrying about Eren, whom he sees as a lost cause, but then apologizes, mentioning that Erwin should have been revived instead of him. Mikasa then notices her scarf is gone. Meanwhile, Floch reveals to everyone that ten months ago, Eren explained his plan to him and that he's always known Eren will manipulate Zeke. Backed by the Jaegerists, he confronts the Volunteers with the reality that their only choice is to accept submission to the New Eldian Empire or death; he immediately shoots one of them dead as a show of force. Floch then tries to convince Mikasa and a shaken Jean to give up fighting and retire as heroes of Paradis, mentioning Hange and Levi's deaths. During the end credits, Falco is now awakened and has lost his memory of the recent battle, although he's uncomfortable about Connie as the two ride toward Ragako. In a post-credits scene outside the ruined Wall, Pieck and Magath discuss the Rumbling when they are approached by Hange with the gravely-injured Levi.
83	24	"Pride"; Transliteration: "Kyōji" (Japanese: 矜持)	Kazuo Miyake	Satoshi Iwataki	February 28, 2022	April 3, 2022
The last of the Wall Titans have left the sight of the walls as the civilians continue taking sides in Eren's course of action. After taking out the pursuing Jaegerists, Hange sets up camp in the forest and stitches up Levi's wounds. While wondering about living isolated in the woods, they receive Eren's message to the Eldians. Later, when Hange and Levi find Pieck and Magath, they offer to ally with them over Levi's goal of killing Zeke. Connie arrives with Falco in Ragako village, where he suggests an awkward task to Falco so he could eventually feed the boy to his immobile Titan mother. Being interrupted by Armin and Gabi, he takes Falco up to the Titan's mouth by force, but the despairing Armin jumps into it instead. He is saved by Connie, who changes his mind about his mother. They all return to Shiganshina where they happen to encounter Annie, who joins them, abandoning Hitch in the process. Meanwhile, Mikasa refuses to join the Jaegerists and recovers her scarf from Louise, whose injuries appear to be fatal. Floch prepares to have himself and Jean execute Yelena and Onyankopon for treason against the Eldian Empire. Onyankopon tries to convince the Jaegerists that massacring the world is insane, but is unsuccessful. He turns to Jean, who is about to shoot him but instead fires four shots into the ground. Answering this, Pieck's Cart Titan form suddenly appears and grabs Jean, Yelena, and Onyankopon in its mouth, taking them to Magath, Levi, and Hange, who have joined forces. At the same time, Jean's shots are also a signal to Mikasa and Connie's group to leave with supplies alongside Annie, Falco, and Gabi. As they leave, Annie notices someone in a window watching them. They then join up with Reiner in their mission to save the world.
84	25	"Night of the End"; Transliteration: "Shūmatsu no Yoru" (Japanese: 終末の夜)	Mitsue Yamazaki	Hiroshi Hamasaki	March 7, 2022	April 10, 2022
Jean envisions a secure future and a happy life with his wife and child. He is brought out of his dream by Hange, who asks him and Mikasa to join the remaining Survey Corps and Marleyans to stop Eren's intended genocide. Though Jean initially pushes back on Hange's offer, he eventually agrees after being reminded of Marco. At their camp in the forest, Magath clashes with the Survey Corps about which side started the conflict and prompts a heated debate over who are the real "devils". Annie confronts Mikasa over whether she would be able to kill Eren if she cannot convince him to stop the Rumbling. They are about to fight over the matter but then agree to first try asking Eren. While the group eats Hange's stew, the flying boat comes up as an option to reach the Founding Titan, but Eren's destination is yet unknown. When Yelena insists she doesn't have a clue either, Magath and Pieck reveal that she is actually a Marleyan, having faked her background to join Zeke. Hearing this, Yelena counters by forcing Reiner, Annie, Armin, and Jean to confront their own actions they had committed under the idea of "saving the world", including how Reiner and Annie caused Marco to be eaten by Titans by forcibly removing his ODM gear, thus preventing the exposure of the Warriors. Furious at Reiner's self-pity over Marco's death, Jean savagely attacks and beats him, but the others intervene. Gabi pleads for Jean's help to save her family in Marley, but he storms off. The next morning, Jean returns and agrees to join their alliance. As they head towards the port in order to take the flying boat, he apologizes to Gabi; however, he admits that he is still unable to forgive Reiner. Pieck goes forward to scout, and they discover that the Jaegerists have control of the port and Floch has taken Kiyomi Azumabito hostage.
85	26	"Traitor"; Transliteration: "Uragirimono" (Japanese: 裏切り者)	Teruyuki Ōmine	Kazuyoshi Katayama & Yuichiro Hayashi	March 14, 2022	April 17, 2022
Hange and Magath survey the occupied port, noticing that the flying boat is still intact -- and that the Jaegerists could destroy it any moment, as they have rigged it with explosives. An enormous amount of steam on the horizon indicates that the Wall Titans have already begun crossing the sea, so the group must act fast. It becomes clear that they need the Azumabito engineers to service the boat and prepare it for flight. However, this would mean defending the Azumabito from the Jaegerists, even by killing all of them. Connie protests against this plan, with Annie and Reiner concluding that the Survey Corps members should not battle their former comrades. Magath tortures Yelena to make her reveal Eren's destination, breaking her arm in the process; she considers talking if the group brings her with them. Having a change of heart, Magath apologizes for burdening the young with the past and asks the Survey Corps to temporarily overlook the bloodshed, but Armin refuses while believing in a peaceful solution. Floch and Kiyomi have a disagreement over the new world order when Armin and Connie ride to the port, announcing to Floch that the Marleyans have escaped by sea, and that they need the flying boat to pursue them. They find it ready to be destroyed, with Samuel and Daz standing guard for the detonator. While initially suspicious of Armin and Connie, the two are eventually convinced to disarm the explosives. Floch remains doubtful and attempts to kill the remaining engineers, but is temporarily subdued by Kiyomi just as Mikasa breaks into the building to save them. Floch escapes outside and announces Mikasa, Armin, and Connie to be traitors. Jean, Hange, and Magath manage to take the Azumabito into the basement for safety. An all-out battle ensues, with Reiner and Annie arriving and transforming into their Titan forms to attack the Jaegerists. On the dock, Armin tries to stop Daz from re-arming the explosives, only to be shot by Samuel. Connie and Armin wrestle with them to prevent the boat's destruction, with Connie eventually shooting and killing Daz and Samuel. Armin recalls Bertholdt crying about how someone must stain their hands with blood.
86	27	"Retrospective"; Transliteration: "Kaiko" (Japanese: 懐古)	Jun Shishido & Yuichiro Hayashi	Iwao Teraoka	March 21, 2022	April 24, 2022
The engineers inform Hange's group that it will take at least half a day to get the flying boat ready. They realize that it will be too late to save Liberio at the Wall Titans' pace. Kiyomi suggests they can leave by ship and take the boat to the Marleyan coastland city of Odiha, where the Azumabito own a hangar. Magath rushes Kiyomi and the engineers to the dock while Annie and Reiner use their Titans to protect them, along with the ship from Floch and the Jaegerists. Mikasa, Hange, Jean and Connie help to fight off their opponents. Seeing the Titans struggling, Falco makes up his mind to fight. Pieck joins the fray after delivering Levi, Gabi, Yelena and Onyankopon to Magath. Hange spots a train of Jaegerist reinforcements approaching, but it suddenly explodes and derails. Falco charges into the chaos and transforms into the Jaw Titan. Managing to barrel through the fight, Floch attempts to destroy the ship's hull with a Thunder Spear but is shot down by Gabi and falls into the sea. Falco eventually loses control of his Titan form and attempts to eat Pieck, but Magath manages to extract him from his Titan. Noticing a captured Marleyan cruiser at the shore, Magath decides to remain behind to destroy it and runs into Commandant Keith Shadis, who had followed them to the port and is revealed to have sabotaged the train. The two men exchange words of mutual respect then use the ship's armory to blow up the cruiser, sacrificing their own lives to ensure the others can sail off to Odiha. In a post-credits scene on the ship, Hange informs the group that Marley and Liberio cannot be saved, much to Annie's distress. After being convinced to stay, Annie once again questions Mikasa on whether she can let Eren be killed to stop the Rumbling, admitting that she is tired of all the violence.
87	28	"The Dawn of Humanity"; Transliteration: "Jinrui no Yoake" (Japanese: 人類の夜明け)	Hidekazu Hara, Mitsue Yamazaki & Tokio Igarashi	Hidekazu Hara, Kazuki Akane & Yuichiro Hayashi	April 4, 2022	May 1, 2022
Months before the assault on Liberio, the Scouts arrived on the Marley shoreline. On their way to visit Azumabito at her home, they witness the persecution received by Subjects of Ymir firsthand after rescuing a young thief named Ramzi from a mob of hostile Marleyans. Azumabito informs the group that Marley has begun cracking down on Subjects of Ymir who escape their internment camps through use of blood tests. Hange hopes to forge peace by allying with the Subjects of Ymir Protection Group. Discovering that Eren has gone missing, Mikasa tracks him down to Ramzi's home. Eren questions Mikasa's loyalty to him, asking what he means to her, to which she is taken aback and calls him her family. The rest of the group catches up and they spend the night partying with Ramzi's family. The next day at the Protection Group's assembly, the representative of the Protection Group declares that Subjects of Ymir who don't view themselves as Eldian should be freed, while the "devils" of Paradis should be exterminated, which receives cheers from the audience. Eren departs and doesn't contact the Scouts again until the assault on Liberio. Mikasa ruminates on that time and wonders if things could have turned out differently had other choices been made. Flashbacks reveal Eren meeting Yelena and agreeing to follow Zeke's euthanasia plan while actually informing Floch and Historia of his real plans; while the latter initially opposes him, she chooses to become pregnant to extend her and Zeke's lifetime, indirectly aiding Eren. Zeke tells Eren that Ackermans are not compelled by blood to protect a "host", and that Mikasa is devoted to him simply because she loves him. Eren tells Zeke that he wants his friends to live long, happy lives after his death. In the present, the Global Alliance makes a futile attempt with their navy to stop Eren and the Rumbling from reaching Marley. They are easily destroyed by the Titans, and Eren declares his intention to destroy the world outside of Paradis as he and the Wall Titans set foot on the mainland.
Part 3: Special Version
SP–1	SP–1	"The Final Chapters (Part 1)"; Transliteration: "Kanketsu-hen (Zenpen)" (Japanese: 完結編（前編）)	Yuichiro Hayashi, Ryota Aikei, Tokio Igarashi & Jun Shishido	Yuichiro Hayashi & Ryota Aikei	March 4, 2023 (Note: Premiered on NHK General TV as a 1 hour special with no advertisement breaks)	September 10, 2023
Chapter 1 – The Rumbling: The Rumbling continues, with the Colossal Titans killing countless people -- Ramzi, Halil, and Grisha's parents among them -- and destroying civilizations all over the world. Meanwhile, the ship carrying the scouts and warriors arrive at Odiha. Thinking her father is already dead, Annie decides to stay behind on the ship with Gabi, Falco, Yelena, and the Azumabito, while the remaining Warriors, Scouts, and Onyankopon take the flying boat to stop Eren. The next day, just as the group are about to take off, Floch, having survived the battle at the port, damages the fuel tank of the flying boat before being killed by Mikasa. However, before the flying boat can be properly repaired, the Rumbling arrives. Hange appoints Armin as the next commander of the Survey Corps before going up against the Colossal Titans alone, buying the others just enough time to get the aircraft off the ground. Hange is eventually killed by the body heat of the Wall Titans and is welcomed to the afterlife by Erwin, Moblit, and the other deceased Scouts. They assure Hange that her duty as commander has been fulfilled. Chapter 2 – Sinners: En route to Eren, the scouts and warriors discuss plans to confront him, with Armin still believing in a peaceful resolution. During their conversation, Eren suddenly brings them into the Paths dimension, explaining that in order to stop the Rumbling, they must kill him. He further elaborates that he will not take away their freedom to do so, just as he has the freedom to keep moving forward with it. Back on the ship, Falco reveals to Annie that he dreamt his Titan might have the ability to fly. Many refugees from Liberio, including the Warriors' families, escape to Fort Salta, a Marleyan military base. As they arrive, they see a number of airships launching an assault on Eren and the Wall Titans. However, the airships are quickly destroyed by the Beast Titan, which had materialized on Eren's skeletal form, leaving everyone utterly hopeless. Just then, the flying boat arrives and the Scouts and Warriors jump from the aircraft. Pieck and Reiner transform, with the latter managing to pin the Beast Titan down. Armin calls out to Eren, asking what about him is truly free.
Part 3: Episode Version
88	29	"The Rumbling"; Transliteration: "Jinarashi" (Japanese: 地鳴らし)	Yuichiro Hayashi	Yuichiro Hayashi	November 5, 2023	N/A
The Rumbling continues, with the Wall Titans killing countless people on the continent of Marley. Some time ago during their Liberio visit, Eren walks around knowing that in the future he would kill all the people around him in the city, since he senses he's predestined to do so. He figures they will never find a peaceful resolution to ensure the survival of Paradis. Despite having this knowledge, he still saves Ramzi from getting beat up by a group of merchants for stealing. Although the boy is grateful to him, Eren tearfully apologizes, telling Ramzi that the outside world he discovered is different from what he imagined it would be and that he made a wish to wipe it all away as a result. Back in the present, the Rumbling continues to march towards other civilizations all across the world. Eren begins to feel a sense of freedom and reaches out to Armin through Paths to ask if he agrees. Before having the chance to respond, Armin snaps back into reality on the ship that's traveling towards Odiha to prepare the flying boat. After sitting down next to Annie, she thanks Armin for his kindness in coming to visit her while she was trapped in the crystal and refers to him as a good person, as she believes being alone all that time would have made her go mad otherwise. Armin admits his feelings for her, but refutes her generosity in claiming he's a good person and reminds her that he is also guilty in regards to killing many innocent people. Armin thinks about the outside world he and Eren imagined as children, and how different it actually was in reality. Despite that, Armin hopes there is something out there in the world they still do not know about.
89	30	"The Wings of Freedom"; Transliteration: "Jiyū no Tsubasa" (Japanese: 自由の翼)	Yuichiro Hayashi & Tokio Igarashi	Yuichiro Hayashi	November 5, 2023	N/A
The scouts and warriors arrive in Odiha to prepare the flying boat. Despite returning Armin's feelings, Annie declines to join the group on the flying boat as she believes her father is dead therefore has no reason to fight. As preparations are made on the flying boat overnight, the group convinces Yelena to divulge where Eren is currently heading. She states that his most likely destination is Fort Salta in southern Marley which contains many of the country's airships, as they are the only remaining obstacles there that stand any real chance of combatting the Rumbling. In the morning, the preparations on the flying boat are nearing its end. As the Azumabito mechanics begin fueling, Floch staggers into the hangar and shoots the aircraft, rupturing the fuel tank before being killed by Mikasa. This delays their take-off and the line of Wall Titans begin to appear in the distance. Hange passes scout command over to Armin and stays behind to buy them some time to fix the flying boat. After repairing the fuel tank, the scouts and warriors along with Onyankopon as their designated pilot depart on the flying boat as the Azumabitos, Annie, Yelena, Falco and Gabi leave on the ship. Hange is killed from the body heat of the Titans while holding them off and is welcomed to the afterlife by Erwin, Moblit, and the other deceased scouts. They assure Hange that the duty as commander has been fulfilled.
90	31	"In the Depths of Despair"; Transliteration: "Zetsubō no Fuchi nite" (Japanese: 絶望の淵にて)	Jun Shishido & Ryota Aikei	Yuichiro Hayashi & Ryota Aikei	November 5, 2023	N/A
The flying boat group is mostly silent as they all deal with the grief of losing Hange. Armin begins to devise a draft plan with his comrades, as he hopes to exhaust all possibilities of a peaceful resolution with Eren through talking before having to use his Colossal Titan shift as a last resort to destroy Eren's Founding Titan. Everyone agrees that there may be a part of Eren that wants them to succeed in defeating him as he has not taken away their ability to Titan shift. During their discussion, Eren pulls all of them into Paths and makes it clear that he will not be dissuaded through discussions and that if they want to stop the Rumbling, they are free to do so by fighting him. Meanwhile, a train of refugees approaches Fort Salta, carrying Eldians from Liberio. Among them are surviving families of the warriors. They hope to take one of the airships into the sky to survive the Rumbling, but to their dismay they see that they are too late as all the crafts have already taken off. Commander Müller reveals to everyone on the ground via loudspeakers that they are conducting a bombing run on the Founding Titan, however they are flying too high as they begin dropping their payloads. During the bombing run, the Beast Titan emerges on the back of the Founding Titan and throws a barrage of debris that destroy the airships and kills everyone on board.
Part 4: Special Version
SP–2	SP–2	"The Final Chapters (Part 2)"; Transliteration: "Kanketsu-hen (Kōhen)" (Japanese: 完結編（後編）)	Yuichiro Hayashi & Tokio Igarashi	Yuichiro Hayashi & Arifumi Imai	November 5, 2023 (Note: Premiered on NHK General TV as a 1 hour and 25 minute special with no advertisement breaks)	January 7, 2024
Chapter 3 – The Battle of Heaven and Earth: The Scouts and Warriors land on Eren's rib cage and incapacitate the Beast Titan, but quickly realize that it is just a shell with Zeke himself nowhere to be found. Before Armin has a chance to transform, he is captured in a Titan's mouth. Suddenly, countless versions of the Nine Titans of the past appear on Eren's back, created by Ymir Fritz to defend him. Just as the Scouts and Warriors are nearly defeated, Annie and Gabi appear on the back of Falco's new flying Jaw Titan. Meanwhile, Armin discovers Zeke in the Paths. Chapter 4 – A Long Dream: Armin and Zeke have a conversation about the meaning of life, and Armin convinces Zeke to share his viewpoint. The two call on the deceased Titan shifters throughout the series to help the alliance; Zeke then materializes on Eren's Titan and allows Levi to kill him, stopping the Rumbling. After Armin is rescued, he uses the power of his Colossal Titan to destroy Eren's Founding Titan, releasing the centipede-like organism, the source of all Titan power, from Eren's nape. Falco flies down to the Liberio refugees, but the reunion between the Warriors and their families is cut short when the source turns the nearby Eldians, including Jean, Connie, and Gabi, into Titans to help defend it. Reiner, Annie, and Pieck engage the Titans and the source to prevent it from reconnecting with Eren, who transforms into the Founding Titan once again to fight Armin; this leaves Mikasa and Levi as the only ones left who can take Eren down. Jumping off of Falco's back, Levi uses a Thunder Spear to destroy Eren's Titan's front teeth, exposing his human form within, before Mikasa rushes in and beheads Eren. Ymir is subsequently freed from the Paths, allowing her to pass on, and the Titan powers, along with the source, disappear from the world. All Eldians are permanently turned back into humans. Final Chapter – Toward the Tree on That Hill: After Eren's death, a conversation between Armin and Eren is shown where Eren talks about why he treated Armin and Mikasa badly earlier, the effect his possession of both the Founding and Attack titan had on his mind, the revelation that eighty percent of the world's population will be wiped out by the end of the Rumbling, and his realization that it was impossible for him to avoid doing the Rumbling. After repeatedly trying to find a way to avoid the Rumbling, Eren decided to go along with it to protect his friends and ensure their statuses would be elevated to the saviors of humanity in the rest of the world, alongside giving them the long, fulfilling lives he wanted them to have in a world free of Titans. As it ends, it is revealed that the conversation had taken place much earlier but Armin's memories of it were suppressed by Eren until Eren's death, and that Eren did the same with the rest of his former friends. After mourning their friend, Armin decides to take credit for killing Eren so as to cover for Mikasa leaving to bury Eren's head on Paradis, and the Scouts and Warriors are hailed as heroes by the survivors of the Rumbling. Three years later, with eighty percent of humanity decimated, the Jaegerists become the dominant faction of Paradis' military and prepare for a potential future attack from the rest of the world, while the remaining Scouts and Warriors become the world's ambassadors for peace negotiations with Paradis. Mikasa, who had buried Eren's head under a tree that he would frequently rest under as a child (the same tree the show starts near), continues to visit his grave throughout the rest of her life. Many generations pass peacefully before a futuristic Paradis is bombed from above and destroyed in a war. Over time, Paradis is reclaimed by the wilderness, and within this wilderness a lone boy and his dog approach the tree Eren is buried beneath, which has since grown to resemble the original tree that contained the source of the Titans' power.
Part 4: Episode Version
91	32	"The Battle of Heaven and Earth"; Transliteration: "Ten to Chi no Tatakai" (Japanese: 天と地の戦い)	Jun Shishido	Yuichiro Hayashi	November 19, 2023	N/A
The Scouts and Warriors lands on Eren's rib cage and incapacitate the Beast Titan before realizing that it is simply an empty shell with Zeke nowhere to be found. Before Armin has a chance to transform, he is captured inside a Titan's mouth. Suddenly, countless iterations of the former Nine Titans appear on Eren's back, created by Ymir Fritz as a way to defend him from the group's assault. While the Scouts try to rescue Armin, Pieck attempts to decapitate Eren's Titan with explosives, only to have her Cart Titan impaled and lifted away by the War Hammer Titan's replica before she is able to pull the trigger. Bertholdt's Colossal Titan replica appears above the battlefield and bites the head of Reiner's Armored Titan off before hurling the body down at the Founder's ribcage. The Scouts are scattered by the resulting impact, with most of them falling off the spines and forced to hang onto the ribcage so they don't fall. Just as the team is nearly defeated, Annie and Gabi appear on the back of Falco's new flying Jaw Titan and carries most of the team out from harm's way. Levi divides the group into two teams to rescue Armin and to attack Eren's nape. The sight of Falco's Titan inspires the Marleyan military at Fort Salta to keep fighting, but they are soon distracted by the arrival of the Eldian refugees from Liberio.
92	33	"Dedicate Your Heart"; Transliteration: "Shinzō o Sasageyo" (Japanese: 心臓を捧げよ)	Jun Shishido & Tokio Igarashi	Yuichiro Hayashi	November 19, 2023	N/A
Jean and Reiner head for the Founding Titan's nape, joining up with Pieck in an attempt to blow off the head with the same explosives she tried to detonate earlier. On the other end of the Eren's Titan, Mikasa, Conny and Annie attempt to chase down the Titan that captured Armin, but are stopped by the Colossal Titan. Armin discovers Zeke inside the Paths, who explains to him that Eren understood what Ymir could not let go of even after 2,000 years and that is why she sided with him. Zeke does not believe escaping the Paths is possible or worth pursuing given that everything simply dies in the end, but Armin convinces Zeke that even the smallest things in life have meaning. Suddenly, Zeke remembers the time he spent playing ball with Xaver. Realizing he still cherishes those memories, he helps bridge the gap between the previous inheritors of the Titans, allowing Xaver, Grisha, Kruger, the Galliard brothers and Ymir's Titan replicas to break free of the Founder's control to help their comrades battle the remaining replicas. Zeke emerges from one of the Founding Titan's spines and calls out to Falco and those riding on his back, particularly Levi.
93	34	"A Long Dream"; Transliteration: "Nagai Yume" (Japanese: 長い夢)	Yuichiro Hayashi & Tokio Igarashi	Yuichiro Hayashi & Arifumi Imai	November 19, 2023	N/A
While marveling about how nice the day looks, Zeke allows Levi to decapitate him, which severs Eren's ability to continue the Rumbling. Jean gets to the detonator and sets off the explosives around the Founding Titan's neck, decapitating it. However, a glowing centipedal creature emerges from its neck in an attempt to reconnect the head. After being rescued, Armin attempts to use the explosive power of his Colossal Titan's transformation to kill it, but he fails and it runs off towards Fort Salta. Meanwhile, Falco flies down to the Liberio refugees, but the reunion between the Warriors and their families is cut short when the centipede creature turns the nearby Eldians, including Jean, Connie and Gabi, into Titans to help defend it. Reiner, Annie, and Pieck engage the Titans and the centipede creature to prevent it from reconnecting with Eren while he transforms into a Colossal form of the Founding Titan to fight Armin's Colossal Titan, leaving Mikasa and Levi as the only ones left who can kill Eren. Jumping off Falco's back mid-flight, Levi uses a thunder spear to destroy the Founding Titan's mouth exposing Eren's real head within. Mikasa immediately enters the Titan's mouth to behead Eren and permanently end the Rumbling. As a result of Eren's death, Ymir is freed from the Paths which allows her to pass on. The centipedal creature responsible for the source of the Titan's powers vanishes and all surviving Eldians turn back into humans. Armin suddenly remembers a conversation with Eren that the latter intentionally wiped from his memory.
94	35	"Toward the Tree on That Hill"; Transliteration: "Ano Oka no Ki ni Mukatte" (Japanese: あの丘の木に向かって)	Yuichiro Hayashi	Yuichiro Hayashi	November 19, 2023	N/A
After Eren's death, a conversation between Armin and Eren is shown where Eren talks about why he treated Armin and Mikasa badly earlier, talks about the effect his possession of both the Founding and Attack titan had on his mind, and reveals that eighty percent of the world's population will be wiped out by the end of the Rumbling and that he realised it was impossible for him to avoid doing the Rumbling after repeatedly trying to find a way to avoid it, so he decided to go along with it to protect his friends and ensure their statuses would be elevated to the saviors of humanity in the rest of the world, alongside giving them the long, fulfilling lives he wanted them to have in a world free of Titans. As it ends, it is revealed that the conversation had taken place much earlier but Armin's memories of it were suppressed by Eren until Eren's death, and that Eren did the same with the rest of his former friends. After mourning their friend, Armin decides to take credit for killing Eren so as to cover for Mikasa leaving to bury Eren's head on Paradis, and the Scouts and Warriors are hailed as heroes by the survivors of the Rumbling. Three years later, with eighty percent of humanity decimated, the Jaegerists become the dominant faction of Paradis' military and prepare for a potential future attack from the rest of the world, while the remaining Scouts and Warriors become the world's ambassadors for peace negotiations with Paradis. Mikasa, who had buried Eren's head under a tree that he would frequently rest under as a child (the same tree the show starts near), sits near the grave and reminisces about life when she and Eren were kids, when a bird comes by and lifts the scarf up as if to wrap it around her, and she thanks Eren.

== Music ==
The soundtrack, composed by Kohta Yamamoto and Hiroyuki Sawano, was released by Pony Canyon in three parts from June 23, 2021, to November 8, 2023. A compilation was released on July 17, 2024.

== Home media release ==
=== Japanese ===
Pony Canyon (Japan – Region 2/A)
Vol.	Episodes	Release date	Ref.
1	60–67	July 7, 2021 (Note: Volume 1 was originally set to be released on May 19, 2021, and Volume 2 on July 21, 2021, before being delayed to their current dates)	
2	68–75	August 4, 2021	
3	76–81	July 20, 2022	
4	82–87	August 17, 2022	
5	Specials 1–2	March 20, 2024	

=== English ===
Crunchyroll, LLC (North America – Region 1/A)
Part	Episodes	Release date	Ref.
1	60–75	February 22, 2022	
2	76–87	March 28, 2023	
3	Specials 1–2	November 26, 2024	
Complete	60–87 + 2 Specials	November 11, 2025	
