= Reggae punk =

British popular music of the late 1970s and early 1980s

- Other names: Punk reggae
- Stylistic origins: Reggae; lovers rock; punk rock
- Cultural origins: Late 1970s, England
- Derivative forms: Ska punk; two-tone; new tone

Other topics
- 2 Tone Records; reggae rock; new wave

Reggae punk (also known as punk reggae) is a genre of music originating in England in the late-1970s. It is characterized by a fusion of reggae music with punk rock. The genre originated amongst punk rock artists who mixed in reggae (and sometimes lovers rock) elements into their punk rock sound. The most notable band to do this was the Clash, having done so on many records. They even covered reggae songs such as Toots and the Maytals' "Pressure Drop", released as the B-side to "English Civil War", both from 1978's Give 'Em Enough Rope. Bob Marley also gave a nod to this genre by writing and recording "Punky Reggae Party" in 1977.

As the 1980s dawned, the genre would infuse itself into other Jamaican inspired genres, such as two-tone and ska punk.

== History ==
=== 1970s ===
Reggae punk first appeared in the late-1970s in England by punk rock bands incorporating reggae (and even lovers rock) elements into their music. The most notable band to have done this was the Clash. They have covered reggae songs by artists such as Toots and the Maytals, and even written their own. This sound continued up until their final album Cut the Crap, with which they avoided the reggae sounds of their prior albums.

When Clash bassist Paul Simonon was getting his start in the music business and learning to play the bass, he found it easier to play along to reggae songs rather than traditional rock songs.

In 1977, reggae musician Bob Marley would give a nod to the reggae-punk scene by writing and recording "Punky Reggae Party".

In July 1977, DJ Tommy Vance of Capital Radio invited John Lydon of the Sex Pistols onto his show, where he gave an interview and was allowed to spin records from his collection. While it featured artists from various genres such as Captain Beefheart and Tim Buckley, no genre was more prominent than reggae, which he revealed he grew up on.

Following on from the first wave of UK punk bands, the Ruts made reggae an integral part of their punk sound, toured with reggae band Misty in Roots, and enjoyed critical acclaim and commercial success before frontman Malcolm Owen's untimely death from a heroin overdose in 1980, although the band continued as the Ruts D.C..

In 1977, the Police would form. Initially considered a punk rock band, they soon expanded their sound to incorporate pop, new wave and reggae. In a retrospective assessment, AllMusic's Stephen Thomas Erlewine argued that the notion of the Police as a punk band was only true "in the loosest sense of the term", and stated that the band's "nervous, reggae-injected pop/rock was punky" and had a "punk spirit" but it "wasn't necessarily punk".

The Slits have also been described as punk-reggae by The Independent.

=== 1980s and beyond ===
In the 1980s, the sounds of reggae punk would be absorbed into other genres. Two-tone, which emerged in the late 1970s, arose from a fusion of punk rock, new wave, reggae, ska and rocksteady. The genre took its name from the 2 Tone record label that was founded by Jerry Dammers of the Specials in 1979.

The Clash's 1980 triple-album Sandinista! has been described as reggae punk by Pitchfork.

In the 1990s, a genre derived from two-tone, ska, punk rock, and hardcore punk, known as ska punk, emerged. It is closely tied to third wave ska which reached its zenith in the mid-1990s. Notable bands of this style of music include Sublime, No Doubt, Less Than Jake, the Mighty Mighty Bosstones, and Fishbone.

The Mighty Mighty Bosstones have also been described as ska-core, which fuses ska punk with hardcore punk.

Ska punk would also fuse itself with crust punk to create crack rock steady. Notable bands within the genre include Choking Victim, Leftöver Crack, Morning Glory and Star Fucking Hipsters.

Reggae punk would also infuse itself into hardcore punk to create reggaecore. Bad Brains are a notable band of this style, incorporating hardcore punk and reggae elements into their sound.
