= List of My Dress-Up Darling episodes =

Key visual for the series

My Dress-Up Darling is a Japanese anime television series based on the manga series My Dress-Up Darling, written and illustrated by Shinichi Fukuda. An anime adaptation was announced in the ninth issue of Young Gangan, which was published in April 2021. It is produced by CloverWorks and directed by Keisuke Shinohara, with Yoriko Tomita handling the series' scripts, and Kazumasa Ishida designing the characters and serving as a chief animation director. Takeshi Nakatsuka composes the series' music. The first season aired from January 9 to March 27, 2022, on Tokyo MX and other networks. (Note: Tokyo MX listed the series premiere as airing on January 8 at 24:00, which is effectively January 9 at midnight JST.) The opening theme song is "Sansan Days" (燦々デイズ; lit. 'Sun-Drenched Days'), performed by Spira Spica, while the ending theme song is "Koi no Yukue" (恋ノ行方; lit. 'Where Love Is'), performed by Akari Akase.

A sequel was announced in September 2022. It was later revealed to be a second season, with the main staff and cast members reprising their roles. It aired from July 6 to September 21, 2025, on Tokyo MX and other networks. (Note: Tokyo MX listed the season premiere as airing on July 5 at 24:00, which is effectively July 6 at midnight JST.) The opening theme song is "Ao to Kirameki" (アオとキラメキ; lit. 'Blue and Sparkle'), performed by Spira Spica, while the ending theme song is "Kawaii Kaiwai", performed by PiKi.

Funimation licensed the series for simulcast outside of Asia. On January 28, 2022, Funimation announced that the series would receive an English dub, which premiered the following day. Following Sony's acquisition of Crunchyroll, the series was moved to the streaming service. Muse Communication licensed the series in Southeast Asia.

== Series overview ==
Season	Episodes	Originally released	
Season	Episodes	First released	Last released
1	12	January 9, 2022	March 27, 2022
2	12	July 6, 2025	September 21, 2025

== Episodes ==
=== Season 1 (2022) ===
No. overall	No. in season	Title	Directed by	Chief animation directed by	Original release date
1	1	"Someone Who Lives in the Exact Opposite World as Me"; Transliteration: "Jibun to wa Magyaku no Sekai de Ikite Iru Hito" (Japanese: 自分とは真逆の世界で生きている人)	Keisuke Shinohara	Kazumasa Ishida	January 9, 2022
Wakana Gojo is an insecure but passionate hina doll tailor. Due to his hobby, Gojo isolates himself out of fear of ridicule from others. One day, Gojo meets Marin Kitagawa, a popular classmate. While he is on cleaning duty after school, Marin arrives, and they have a conversation where she tells him he needs to be honest about his true feelings. That night, Gojo reflects on what Marin had told him. When his sewing machine stops working, his grandfather expresses his desire to buy a new one. While a new machine is being delivered, Gojo decides to use the one present in his school's sewing room. However, Marin arrives, and instead of laughing at him, she expresses her admiration for his tailoring skills. Suddenly, Marin removes her clothes and shows Gojo a cosplay outfit of a video game character she has been working on, which he inadvertently berates. She then asks him if he can make one, explaining how important the character Shizuku Kuroe is to her. Despite having never done clothing for a real person before, Gojo agrees to assist her and promises to do his best, much to Marin's delight.
2	2	"Wanna Hurry Up, and Do It?"; Transliteration: "Sassoku, Shiyokka?" (Japanese: さっそく、しよっか？)	Yoshihiro Hiramine	Tomomi Kawatsuma	January 16, 2022
Marin explains her desire to cosplay as Shizuku, a female character from the erotic video game Slippery Girls 2, perplexing Gojo. She then explains that gender does not matter when one enjoys doing something, to which he agrees. Afterward, she gives him an instruction booklet on making cosplay outfits. The next day, an eager Marin unexpectedly arrives at Gojo's shop. Gojo feels uneasy about taking her measurements while naked, but an unfazed Marin strips down to reveal she came wearing a bathing suit. When he inquires if she finds this embarrassing, she responds she is not. As such, Gojo pushes his impure thoughts aside and begins measuring Marin more professionally. Despite his concentration, a flustered Gojo has difficulty measuring her bust and inseam, though he eventually obtains the complete measurements. Gojo then asks Marin if she has any references for Shizuku, prompting her to give him both Slippery Girls titles. Later that night, Gojo plays the games for research, much to his grandfather's dismay.
3	3	"Then Why Don't We?"; Transliteration: "Ja, Tsukiatchau?" (Japanese: じゃ、付き合っちゃう？)	Directed by : Hideyuki Satake; Storyboarded by : Keisuke Shinohara	Jun Yamazaki	January 23, 2022
The night before returning to school, Gojo has a vivid wet dream about Marin. At school, Gojo evades Marin for most of the day. She finally manages to find him at the school entrance and asks if he wants to go shopping for the materials needed for the outfit. However, Gojo reluctantly refuses. When Marin finds him again, Gojo explains why he left. Seeing his low self-esteem, she assures him they are friends. They head to multiple stores to shop. Later that night, they head to a ramen shop, where they embarrass and worry the other customers when they discuss the Slippery Girls games. Walking back, Gojo tells Marin because of his line of work, he can only call things beautiful or pretty when he truly means it. Before they part ways, Marin mentions an upcoming cosplay event in two weeks. Seeing how little time he has to design the outfit, Gojo worries.
4	4	"Are These Your Girlfriend's?"; Transliteration: "Kore, Kanojo no Toka?" (Japanese: これ、彼女のとか？)	Yūichirō Komuro	Kazumasa Ishida	January 30, 2022
With a two-week deadline to prepare Marin's outfit, Gojo becomes stressed. When he heads home, his grandfather falls over after seeing one of the contents in Gojo's bag as it fell out. As such, Gojo takes him to the hospital, where his cousin, Miori, joins him. At school, Gojo explains what happened to Marin. Genuinely worried, she tells him she wants to help him in any way possible, so they exchange their contact information. Thanks to all the tasks he had to do, an exhausted Gojo becomes distraught until he remembers a conversation he had with his grandfather, which reinvigorates him. The next day, Gojo tells Marin he finished the outfit, much to her surprise. When she admits she did not clearly convey the situation to him, Gojo is relieved to know he still has time to complete the outfit. However, Marin breaks down crying and apologizes profusely. Gojo calms her down by telling her it will be worth it if she is happy with the outfit. When Marin puts it on, she is immensely pleased with the results.
5	5	"It's Probably Because This Is the Best Boob Bag Here"; Transliteration: "Kono Naka de Ichiban Ii Chichibukuro da kara Jan?" (Japanese: この中で一番いい乳袋だからじゃん？)	Directed by : Takashi Sakuma; Storyboarded by : Yoshihiro Hiramine	Jun Yamazaki	February 6, 2022
Marin excitedly asks Gojo to take some pictures of her. When he does, he asks her to pose more as Shizuku would. Once happy with the results, Marin uploads the pictures on social media. She then tells Gojo they shall attend a cosplay event the following day. Marin is incredibly excited when they arrive there, while Gojo is more restrained. Later, several attendees approach Marin to take her picture. While he watches Marin have fun, Gojo wonders if this will be the last time they will hang out together, having fulfilled his promise. When they reunite, she explains her dress is becoming uncomfortable due to the intense heat, so they head inside to cool off and alleviate her stress. Feeling better, Marin tells Gojo they shall return to the plaza one last time before leaving. She meets with a lady who had asked her for a picture earlier. When they head home, Marin asks Gojo what cosplay they should work on next, much to his relief. A drowsy Gojo then tells her she looks beautiful. Marin is stunned as she remembers what Gojo previously said concerning this issue.
6	6	"For Real?!"; Transliteration: "Ma!?" (Japanese: マ！？)	Shin'ichirō Ushijima	Shinpei Kobayashi, Tomomi Kawatsuma, Jun Yamazaki & Kazumasa Ishida	February 13, 2022
Gojo's grandfather returns home, and he is shocked when he sees Gojo and Marin hanging out together. Once they clear up the situation, Marin realizes she has fallen in love with Gojo. Marin tells Gojo and his grandfather about her family situation and questionable eating habits as they eat dinner. The next day, a young girl named Sajuna Inui arrives at the shop during a downpour, and Gojo's grandfather invites her inside. Following an embarrassing first meeting and misunderstanding, Sajuna eventually tells Gojo she wants to commission a cosplay outfit, revealing that she is "Juju," the cosplayer Marin previously mentioned. When Marin arrives, she is starstruck by Juju's presence. While they talk, Juju expresses her desire to cosplay as Shion Nikaido, a character from the anime Flower Princess Blaze!!, of whom Marin is also a fan. When Juju asks Marin why she does not want to cosplay as Shion despite being a fan, she responds that their physiques do not match. As such, Juju gains immense respect for Marin as a cosplayer. Before she leaves, Juju asks Gojo for his contact information. She then realizes that Gojo and Marin are not dating.
7	7	"A Home Date with the Guy I Wuv Is the Best"; Transliteration: "Shukipi to Ouchi Dēto Yaba" (Japanese: しゅきぴとおうちデートやばっ)	Directed by : Ken Sanuma; Storyboarded by : Yoshihiro Hiramine	Shinpei Kobayashi	February 20, 2022 (Note: Episode 7 aired at 12:05 a.m. JST, five minutes after its regular air time.)
Juju declines Marin's proposal to do a group cosplay until Marin and Gojo offer to split the studio fees. Gojo decides to watch Flower Princess Blaze!! for research. Later that night, his grandfather praises his improvement and encourages him to practice his tailoring and makeup skills with Marin. Gojo arrives at Marin's apartment the next day, only to find her disheveled. When she finally lets him in, she tells him they should watch the series together. As they do so, Marin realizes she is having a home date with Gojo. Just then, her stomach grumbles, and he offers to buy something. However, Marin insists on cooking a homemade meal. Despite not going as planned, Marin is delighted when Gojo legitimately enjoys her omurice. Back home, Gojo calls Juju and sends her his detailed sketches. Juju is shocked to learn Marin's outfit was his first cosplay project. Before they hang up, she explains her younger sister takes her pictures and agrees to meet at a restaurant. However, when Gojo and Marin meet the shy and reserved Shinju Inui, they are blown away by her large size and voluptuous curves.
8	8	"Backlighting Is the Best"; Transliteration: "Gyakkō, Osusume Desu" (Japanese: 逆光、オススメです)	Yūsuke Kawakami	Mayumi Nakamura	February 27, 2022
Shinju shows Marin the camera she uses to take Juju's pictures and begins explaining the different filters and settings. The group then visits the studio, located at an abandoned hospital. Inside, Shinju shows the benefits of backlit pictures to Marin. Meanwhile, Gojo finds a scared Juju, and they talk about their respective dreams. When she reveals why she chose him to make her cosplay outfit, Gojo recalls another conversation he had with his grandfather. As such, he joyously grabs Juju's hand, which causes her to pass out. After finishing their school finals, Marin invites Gojo to the beach. When they arrive there, a large sea hawk steals Marin's burger. As they share the remaining burger, Marin decides to enter the ocean. Once he joins her, Gojo reveals he never got to visit many places during his childhood due to his hobby. Stunned, Marin tells him she will take him to many places during their summer vacation. Realizing what she just said, Marin excuses herself. While she is alone, she swoons about the situation before taking a picture of Gojo.
9	9	"A Lot Happened After I Saw That Photo"; Transliteration: "Shashin o Mitara Iroiro Atta kara Desu" (Japanese: 写真を見たら色々あったからです)	Yūta Yamazaki	Shinpei Kobayashi & Kazumasa Ishida	March 6, 2022
Gojo and Marin arrive from the store with the materials for the Black Lobelia outfit. Marin then shows Gojo a swimsuit under her clothes and asks him if he thinks it is proper for the cosplay. An embarrassed Gojo eventually tells her it is fine. Afterward, he is happy Marin can finally experience the joy of being helpful. Sometime later, Gojo presents Juju and Marin with their completed outfits before he does Marin's makeup with Juju's guidance. The girls head to the hospital, waiting for Gojo and Shinju. When they finally arrive, Shinju stuns the girls with a male cosplay outfit. In a flashback to the day they first visited the hospital, after Juju and Marin went home, Shinju confirmed Gojo's suspicion she actually wanted to cosplay as well. When he agreed to help her, she revealed she wanted to cosplay as Soma, a male character from Flower Princess Blaze!!. Once Gojo took Shinju to his shop, they learned about an item to deal with her chest called a B holder. They later had a conversation while working on Shinju's wig and makeup. Back in the present, everyone takes a group picture.
10	10	"We've All Got Struggles"; Transliteration: "Dare ni demo Iroiro Arun Desu" (Japanese: 誰にでも色々あるんです)	Directed by : Kento Nakagomi; Storyboarded by : Yūna Suginogaki	Hirohiko Sukegawa (Note: De facto via animation director credits)	March 13, 2022
In the hospital, Marin and the Inui sisters have their photoshoot. Juju later thanks Gojo for helping Shinju realize her love of cosplay. Having finished, Juju and Shinju are at home, where Juju admits to Shinju she is jealous of her for pulling off such a cosplay. She then happily admires some pictures where Gojo appears. Meanwhile, Gojo is talking with Marin on the phone, and she gets jealous when Gojo tells her Shinju was at his house. Sometime later, Marin expresses her desire to cosplay as Veronica, a dark-skinned fighting game character, and they agree to get that effect digitally. However, Marin appears at his house the next day with her skin completely darkened with foundation to match Veronica's skin color. After she bathes, she embarrasses him when she exposes herself to show him how to accomplish the outfit. Wanting to buy clothes for him, Marin takes Gojo to the clothing store. Walking back, Gojo admits to Marin he cannot help her with the Veronica outfit. Shocked and concerned, she asks him why, and he nervously tells her it is too revealing. Relieved, she teases him and agrees to choose her characters carefully.
11	11	"I Am Currently at a Love Hotel"; Transliteration: "Ore wa Ima, Rabu Hoteru ni Imasu" (Japanese: 俺は今、ラブホテルにいます)	Yūsuke Yamamoto	Jun Yamazaki	March 20, 2022
Marin invites Gojo to a manga café, but Gojo feels embarrassed being alone with her. Marin recommends a manga titled SuccIDK to Gojo and expresses her disappointment that she cannot pull off cosplaying as Liz the Succubus. However, with Gojo's encouragement, she decides to try it. Gojo has difficulty designing the outfit due to the series' simple art style. They later meet for the photoshoot only to discover the studio Marin booked is actually a love hotel. Marin sits on top of Gojo to get the desired camera angle for one shot. After taking the picture, Gojo hears a couple in another room having sex. Gojo panics and tries to get Marin off of him by grabbing her waist, which startles her enough to turn the lights off inadvertently. As they slowly lean towards each other, the phone rings to inform them that their time in the room is over. Back home, Gojo thinks about Marin while alone in his room.
12	12	"My Dress-Up Darling"; Transliteration: "Sono Bisuku Dōru wa Koi o Suru" (Japanese: その着せ替え人形(ビスク・ドール)は恋をする)	Directed by : Yoshihiro Hiramine; Storyboarded by : Yūta Yamazaki	Kazumasa Ishida & Jun Yamazaki	March 27, 2022
In her apartment, while Gojo helps Marin with her hair ribbons, he discovers her father canceled her invitation to go to a summer festival, as she had not done her homework. She tells Gojo she has been modeling for a magazine to save up for an expensive camera. When they decide to watch a horror movie, Gojo is nervous as he has not watched one before. However, by the movie's end, he analyzes the costumes while Marin is left scared. They then visit their school to retrieve Marin's math drills, and Gojo saves Marin from drowning when she slips into the pool. Having finished her homework, Marin invites Gojo to the festival, and he is stunned when she shows up in a yukata, making her happy. They watch the fireworks together, and Gojo carries Marin home when her feet are bruised from walking on sandals. Back home, Marin calls Gojo, telling him she wants to hear his voice, as she got scared after watching another horror movie alone. During their talk, Gojo begins to fall asleep, and after he has passed out, Marin tells him she loves him, though he remains completely unaware.

=== Season 2 (2025) ===
No. overall	No. in season	Title	Directed by	Chief animation directed by	Original release date
13	1	"Wakana Gojo, 15 Years Old, Teenager"; Transliteration: "Gojō Wakana - Jūgo-sai - Shishun-ki" (Japanese: 五条新菜 15(じゅうご)歳 思春期)	Keisuke Shinohara	Kazumasa Ishida, Jun Yamazaki & Yohei Yaegashi	July 6, 2025
Gojo watches the anime series We're the Tsukiyono Company in preparation for making Marin's Halloween cosplay outfit: Arisha in the bunny girl outfit she wears in the show's first episode. Gojo has difficulty making the outfit as the strapless corset keeps slipping. While thinking about using transparent straps, the fabric store clerk Usami suggests that Gojo adds boning on the corset, which solves the problem. However, another problem arises as Marin's panties are showing while wearing them under the corset. The next day, Gojo and Marin visit the studio. Marin puts on the completed outfit having solved that problem by wearing adhesive underwear and skin-colored tights. At the Halloween party in Tokyo, Marin and her gyaru friends Nowa Sugaya, Kensei Morita, Shiki Kashiwagi, Rune Yamauchi, and Daia Yahiro hold a party at a karaoke parlor with Gojo wearing a bunny mascot costume.
14	2	"You Can Equip Boobs"; Transliteration: "Oppai wa Sōbi Dekiru kara" (Japanese: おっぱいは装備できるから)	Yūsuke Yamamoto	Kazumasa Ishida, Jun Yamazaki & Yohei Yaegashi	July 13, 2025
Nowa asks if Marin and Gojo are dating, causing him to spill his drink on his costume and Marin to take him to the restroom to clean it. Marin is approached by her hair stylist Hikaru Kikuchi and Gojo intervenes mistakenly believing he is hitting on Marin. Days later, Marin stays home from school having come down with a cold and Gojo feigns having a cold to leave school early to visit her. Gojo cares for her until his classmates suddenly appear, prompting Gojo to hide in the balcony and catches a cold himself. Sometime later after Gojo and Marin recover from their colds, they head to the aquarium for a cosplay event with Marin wearing Shizuku-tan's Humiliation Cafe uniform. They meet Amane Himeno, cosplaying as Subaru Hatsusegawa from the anime Space Idol Cosmic Lovers, who is revealed to be a man. While fixing up Amane's costume, Gojo notices that he carries liquid glue, which Amane uses to look convincingly feminine. When Gojo is shown a picture of Amane with enlarged breasts, Amane explains that he equipped boobs to make them look real.
15	3	"I Wuuuuv Slice-of-Life Scenes! ♥♥♥"; Transliteration: "Nichijō Pāto Metcha Suko~~♡♡♡" (Japanese: 日常パートめっちゃすこ〰〰♡♡♡)	Tomoki Yoshikawa	Kazumasa Ishida, Jun Yamazaki & Yohei Yaegashi	July 20, 2025
Amane brings Gojo and Marin to a shop that specializes in cosplay where he shows them the breast plate he puts on to equip boobs, as well as all the accessories he uses for crossplay from invisible tape to wigs. Afterwards, Marin and Amane head out for a photo shoot with Amane having photo shoots with other cosplayers that include two from Space Idol Cosmic Lovers. Amane, whose real name is Chitose Amano, explains how he got into crossplay as his sister complimented him for dressing as a girl, while he was ridiculed by his classmates for not having a manly figure, and by crossdressing he has a renewed sense of self. His hobby resulted in a breakup with his girlfriend, causing Gojo to reflect on his own feelings on the theme. Sometime later, Gojo meets up with Marin while doing a photo shoot for the upcoming winter issue of a fashion catalog, noting that it happens when the weather is too warm. After the shoot, the two go to Marin's apartment to celebrate Shizuku's birthday.
16	4	"Has All My Measurements Memorized"; Transliteration: "Atashi no Karada no Koto, Zenbu Shitte-runda" (Japanese: あたしの体の事、全部知ってるんだ)	Directed by : Takashi Sakuma; Storyboarded by : Mamoru Kurosawa	Kazumasa Ishida, Jun Yamazaki & Yohei Yaegashi	July 27, 2025
The school culture festival approaches with the main event being a crossdressing beauty pageant, and Marin decides to enter it by cosplaying as Rei, the student council president of an all-girls school who secretly dresses as a host for her part-time job in The Student Council President is the No. 1 Host. Gojo watches the show and discusses it with Marin to figure out how to design her costume. One big issue is that Marin is too slender to be convincing as a guy. With only two weeks until the festival, Gojo asks Marin to make the costume with Gojo only doing the interior design and manual labor. Knowing that Gojo is taking on too much responsibility, his classmates decide to help him out. After school, Gojo and Marin visit the fabric store to buy the fabric for the costume.
17	5	"800 Million"; Transliteration: "Hachi Oku" (Japanese: 8(はち)億)	Directed by : Yūichirō Komuro; Storyboarded by : Shin Wakabayashi	Kazumasa Ishida, Jun Yamazaki & Yohei Yaegashi	August 3, 2025
Gojo explains how dolls are mass-produced in the family's business, emphasizing the fact that Marin will need help from others for her next cosplay outfit. As festival preparations continue, Gojo begins making Marin's outfit with Marin providing him with food she prepared for him. With nine days before the festival, Marin's friends work on the champagne call for her to perform while on stage. Five days later, the costume is finished, and Marin puts it on after putting on shapewear to look more manly. However, the suit is too big as her suit was made with her measurements before putting on shapewear. Gojo decides on a plan to adjust the suit, while asking Morita to help her with etiquette. Afterwards, another classmate Murakami comes in wanting a photo of Marin in her cosplay outfit while admitting he is a fan of The Student Council President is the No. 1 Host.
18	6	"I'll Make It Happen, No Matter What with These Two Hands"; Transliteration: "Ore ga Zettai ni - Ore no Te de" (Japanese: 俺が絶対に 俺の手で)	Directed by : Nobuhide Kariya; Storyboarded by : Nobuhide Kariya & Keiichirō Saitō	Kazumasa Ishida, Jun Yamazaki & Yohei Yaegashi	August 10, 2025
As preparations continue, Gojo's classmate Seira makes the rainbow rose for the costume by taking a white rose, splitting its roots, and soaking them in water infused with food coloring overnight. The two-day festival begins with Gojo spending the day continuing to fix Marin's costume, while Class 1-3 takes a big lead over Class 1-5 in the school festival competition. On the second day, Gojo completes the costume and applies makeup on Marin's face just before the pageant begins after nearly having a nervous breakdown. Marin walks on stage and performs her champagne call, using the student council president as her customer in her performance to win the pageant. As a result, Class 1-5 wins the overall competition and afterwards, the class celebrates with an after party at a karaoke parlor. Following the after party, Gojo and Marin hang out at the arcade and go bowling with other classmates.
19	7	"Capture Those Delicious Memories!"; Transliteration: "Omoide Kizamu ze!" (Japanese: 思い出刻むぜ！)	Yūsuke Yamamoto	Kazumasa Ishida, Jun Yamazaki & Yohei Yaegashi	August 17, 2025
While Marin gets her hair done, one of her stylists, Manabu Hasegawa, notices that she has gained weight. A few days later during a photo shoot, her manager says the same thing. After getting home from work, Marin tries to put on the costumes Gojo made and see that they do not fit anymore. The next day, Marin tries to figure out why she gained weight, and she explains that she had been snacking too much and eating all the food she took home from Gojo's house in a single day. The next day after school, Marin shows off her new pair of loose socks she bought and asks Gojo to photograph her with her new DSLR camera she purchased. The two spend the afternoon using the new camera and are impressed with the picture quality. Afterwards, Marin mentions that there is an upcoming cosplay event and Gojo is interested in making props after seeing a blogger named Akira making and posing with them. That night, Marin shows off the camera to Gojo's grandfather.
20	8	"The Only Way I Can Think of to Express That Gratitude Is with Money"; Transliteration: "Kansha no Tsutae-kata ga Kakin Shika Omoitsukanai" (Japanese: 感謝の伝え方が課金しか思い付かない)	Yūki Gotō	Yohei Yaegashi	August 24, 2025
Gojo and Marin arrive in Ikebukuro for the cosplay event. Marin meets up with Amane, while also meeting up with the photographer Suzuka Ito, and her friend Miyako Honda. Suzuka gives Marin tips on using her DSLR camera. Meanwhile, Gojo meets up with Akira Ogata, who he finds out is a woman and is cosplaying as an original character. Gojo and Akira talk about props as Marin notifies him that Suzuka invited her to the after party. After the event, Gojo, Marin, Amane, Suzuka, Miyako, and Akira get together for the after party at a cafe to discuss an upcoming group cosplay event that Miyako had originally planned but had to cancel due to her group members having to work. Miyako decides to form a new group for the event to cosplay as nuns from the horror game Coffin. Marin, Amane, Suzuka, and Miyako agree to form a group with two more members needed. Marin calls Juju to ask her if she wants to join.
21	9	"Because I Don't Intend to Sleep Tonight"; Transliteration: "Ore - Kon'ya Neru Tsumori Nainode" (Japanese: 俺 今夜寝るつもりないので)	Haruka Tsuzuki	Yohei Yaegashi	August 31, 2025
Juju refuses to join the cosplay group insisting that she only cosplays for herself but changes her mind after Shinju convinces her. Juju and Shinju join the after party to discuss roles, while Gojo agrees to make the props with the costumes premade by a professional. Afterwards, Akira tells Gojo and Amane in private about how she truly feels about Marin as she feels uneasy being around her. That night, Gojo plays Coffin at Marin's apartment in order to figure out what props he needs to make. Gojo ends up having to spend the night at Marin's apartment due to an accident that causes train service to be suspended for the night. They go shopping at Don Quijote and, feeling uneasy about sleeping over at Marin's place, Gojo decides to buy an energy drink to stay up all night under the belief that staying up all night does not constitute sleeping over. As Gojo stares at the drink, Marin believes that he is looking to buy aphrodisiacs that are on the shelf next to the energy drinks.
22	10	"So We're Gonna Do It All Right Now?!"; Transliteration: "Ima kara Zenbu Surutte Koto!?" (Japanese: 今から全部するって事！？)	Yoshihiro Hiramine	Jun Yamazaki	September 7, 2025
Back at her apartment, Marin feels uneasy thinking that Gojo bought an aphrodisiac to have a sexual relationship with her. After Marin and Gojo take turns using the shower, Gojo notices that Marin is not acting like her usual upbeat self. Marin goes to bed while Gojo stays up to play Coffin and beats it. The next morning, Marin wakes up and sees that Gojo bought energy drinks to stay awake all night and not aphrodisiacs. That night after Gojo returns home, he discusses the game with Shinju and Juju. As Juju makes the wig for Shinju's costume, Shinju tells her that she is location scouting with Marin. Meanwhile, Marin feels depressed after mistakenly believing that Gojo wanted to have sex with her. The next day, Marin spaces out due to depression, but tries to hide it from Gojo. After having dinner at Gojo's house, Marin heads back to her apartment, determined to confess her love to Gojo.
23	11	"I Didn't Think Anything Good Would Ever Happen to Me"; Transliteration: "Jibun no Jinsei ni wa Yoi Kotonante Okoranai to Omotteta" (Japanese: 自分の人生には良い事なんて起こらないと思ってた)	Yūsuke Yamamoto	Yohei Yaegashi	September 14, 2025
Juju reveals that her refusal to do group cosplay stems from her petite figure and inferiority complex towards Shinju, but the group assures her for the upcoming shoot. As preparations continue, Miyako and Suzuka help Juju with her appearance for a solo shoot as Black Lobelia, while Gojo and Akira work together at his shop to make props. Akira tells Gojo how she got into cosplay as her parents did not approve of her hobby, but after a chance encounter with Miyako and Suzuka in front of a gashapon machine, they became friends and through them, she got into cosplay. Afterwards, Juju has her shoot as Black Lobelia, which was designed to get her confidence up for the group cosplay. She explains that the main reason she does not do group cosplay is because she thinks that she will have to give it up when she grows up. After Juju's shoot, the group has takoyaki as they prepare for the group cosplay the next day.
24	12	"Dear My Dress-Up Darling"	Keisuke Shinohara (Note: Storyboarded by: Keisuke Shinohara, Yusuke Kawakami, Tomoki Yoshikawa, Yoshihiro Hiramine & Yūichirō Komuro)	Kazumasa Ishida, Jun Yamazaki & Yohei Yaegashi	September 21, 2025
The day of the group cosplay arrives, and after Gojo drops by Marin's apartment to make preparations, the group arrives at the studio. They get changed and hold a shoot of the dinner table scene using the props and special effects that Gojo and Akira prepared. During a break, Gojo meets with Juju privately, where she admits that she did the group cosplay out of obligation as a big sister before fainting due to her dislike of horror. Akira shouts out her feelings towards Marin after finding Marin cute in her cosplay. After the shoot, Suzuka and Miyako apologize to Marin for using her, but Marin lets them know that it is important to understand how others feel, which she accomplished at the shoot. Afterwards, everybody goes home with Marin and Gojo returning to Marin's apartment together and Marin taking a selfie in front of the door.

== Home media release ==
=== Japanese ===
Aniplex+ (Japan – Region 2/A)
Vol.	Episodes	Cover character (cosplay)	Release date	Ref.
Season 1
1	1–2	Marin Kitagawa	March 23, 2022	
2	3–4	Marin Kitagawa (Shizuku Kuroe)	April 27, 2022	
3	5–6	Sajuna Inui (Black Lily)	May 25, 2022	
4	7–8	Marin Kitagawa (Black Lobelia)	June 29, 2022	
5	9–10	Shinju Inui (Soma Tengeji)	July 27, 2022	
6	11–12	Marin Kitagawa (Liz-kyun)	August 31, 2022	
Season 2
7	13–14	Marin Kitagawa (Arisa Izayoi)	September 24, 2025	
8	15–16	Chitose Amano (Subaru Hatsusegawa)	October 29, 2025	
9	17–18	Marin Kitagawa (Rei Kogami)	November 26, 2025	
10	19–20	Marin Kitagawa	December 24, 2025	
11	21–22	Marin Kitagawa	January 28, 2026	
12	23–24	Marin Kitagawa (Rose)	February 25, 2026	

=== English ===
Crunchyroll, LLC (North America – Region 1/A)
Season	Episodes	Release date	Ref.
1	1–12	November 7, 2023	
