= My Dress-Up Darling (TV series) =

Japanese anime television series

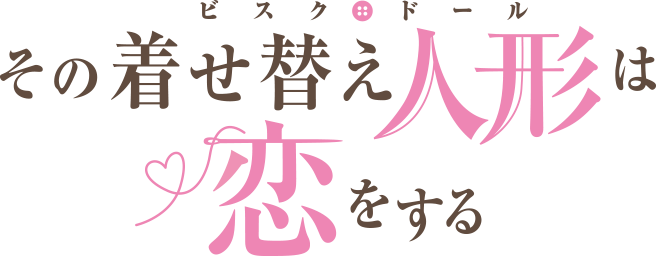
- その着せ替え人形(ビスク・ドール)は恋をする; Sono Bisuku Dōru wa Koi o Suru
- Genre: Romantic comedy; Slice of life
- Based on: My Dress-Up Darling by Shinichi Fukuda
- Written by: Yoriko Tomita
- Directed by: Keisuke Shinohara
- Voices of: Shōya Ishige; Hina Suguta; Atsumi Tanezaki; Hina Yōmiya; Atsushi Ono
- Narrated by: Misako Tomioka
- Music by: Takeshi Nakatsuka
- Opening theme: "Sansan Days" by Spira Spica (S1); "Ao to Kirameki" by Spira Spica (S2)
- Ending theme: "Koi no Yukue" by Akari Akase (S1); "Kawaii Kaiwai" by PiKi (S2)
- Country of origin: Japan
- Original language: Japanese
- No. of seasons: 2
- No. of episodes: 24 (list of episodes)

Production
- Executive producers: Akihiro Sotokawa; Hiroyuki Shimizu; Masanori Miyake; Ryuji Abe
- Producers: List: Yoshinori Hasegawa; Tomoyuki Ōwada; Nobuhiro Nakayama (S1 / chief; S2); Shōta Komatsu (S1); Fumitaka Kitazawa (S1); Yasutaka Kimura (chief; S2); Miho Matsumoto (S2); Mai Yamaguchi (S2); Rieko Nagamine (S2); Yūichi Fukushima (S2)
- Cinematography: Tsubasa Kanamori (S1); Ruri Satō (S2)
- Animator: CloverWorks
- Editor: Daisuke Hiraki
- Running time: 23 minutes
- Production companies: Aniplex; Square Enix; Movic; Tokyo MX; BS11; Studio Mausu; CloverWorks (S2)

Original release
- Network: Tokyo MX; BS11; GYT; GTV
- Release: January 9, 2022 – September 21, 2025

My Dress-Up Darling (Japanese: その着せ替え人形(ビスク・ドール)は恋をする, Hepburn: Sono Bisuku Dōru wa Koi o Suru; transl. "The Bisque Doll Falls in Love") (Note: The kanji 着せ替え人形 in the original title, glossed over with the katakana loanword "Bisque Doll" (ビスク・ドール, Bisuku Dōru), is typically read as Kisekae Ningyō ("lit. 'Dress-up Doll'").) is a Japanese anime television series based on the manga series My Dress-Up Darling by Shinichi Fukuda. The series was produced by CloverWorks, directed by Keisuke Shinohara, and written by Yoriko Tomita.

The first season aired from January 9 to March 27, 2022, on Tokyo MX, BS11, GYT and GTV. (Note: The series premiere was listed as airing on January 8 at 24:00, which is effectively January 9 at midnight JST.) The second season aired on the same stations from July 6 to September 21, 2025, with the main staff and cast members reprising their roles.

== Series overview ==
| Season | Episodes | Originally released | |
| Season | Episodes | First released | Last released |
|---|---|---|---|
| 1 | 12 | January 9, 2022 | March 27, 2022 |
| 2 | 12 | July 6, 2025 | September 21, 2025 |

== Broadcasting and distribution ==
The My Dress-Up Darling television series adaptation was announced in the ninth issue of Young Gangan seinen magazine, published in April 2021. It was produced by CloverWorks and directed by Keisuke Shinohara, with Yoriko Tomita handling series composition and screenplay, and Kazumasa Ishida designing the characters and serving as series chief animation director. Takeshi Nakatsuka composes the series' music. Funimation licensed the series for simulcast outside of Asia. On January 28, 2022, Funimation announced that the series would receive an English dub, which premiered the following day. Following Sony's acquisition of Crunchyroll, the series was moved to the streaming service. Muse Communication licensed the series in Southeast Asia. The first season aired from January 9 to March 27, 2022, on Tokyo MX, BS11, GYT and GTV. The opening theme song is "Sansan Days" (燦々デイズ; lit. 'Sun-Drenched Days'), performed by Spira Spica, while the ending theme song is "Koi no Yukue" (恋ノ行方; lit. 'Where Love Is'), performed by Akari Akase. A second season was later announced in September 2022. It aired from July 6 to September 21, 2025, on the same networks, (Note: The season premiere was listed as airing on July 5 at 24:00, which is effectively July 6 at midnight JST.) with the main staff and cast members reprising their roles. The opening theme song is "Ao to Kirameki" (アオとキラメキ; lit. 'Blue and Sparkle'), performed by Spira Spica, while the ending theme song is "Kawaii Kaiwai", performed by PiKi.

The series began streaming worldwide on Netflix on April 25, 2026.

== Reception ==
=== Critical reception ===
My Dress-Up Darling was generally well received. Reviewing the anime's first season, IGN's Kambole Campbell described the show as a "supremely enjoyable portrayal of the joy of sharing a craft." The review praised the performances as "genuine as they are entertaining." Slashfilm's Rafael Motamayor wrote that the series is "not technical enough to turn the audience or the characters off, but enough that you can appreciate the very hard work that goes into cosplaying." He also praised its English translation as "go[ing] the extra mile to portray [Marin's] personality through the subtitles, capturing her gyaru idioms and even random gibberish that she says out loud." Collider's David Lynn praised Gojo and Marin, the series' two main characters, as "simultaneously broadly universal and yet surprisingly complex" with "distinct strengths and flaws". The series also received criticism by some for its fan service and sexualization of the characters. IGN's Campbell wrote that "There are a handful of leery moments that'll take some viewers out of it." Writing for Bleeding Cool, Alejandra Bodden generally praised the series' exploration of sexuality but criticized some scenes as being uncomfortable.

=== Accolades ===
| Year | Award | Category | Recipient | Result | Ref. |
|---|---|---|---|---|---|
| 2022 | 44th Anime Grand Prix | Best Character (Female) | Marin Kitagawa | 5th place | |
| 2022 | 12th Newtype Anime Awards | Best Work (TV) | My Dress-Up Darling | 9th place | |
| 2022 | 12th Newtype Anime Awards | Best Character (Female) | Marin Kitagawa | 7th place | |
| 2022 | Reiwa Anisong Awards | Composition Award | "Sansan Days" by Spira Spica (Note: Yuji Teranishi is credited as the nominee.) | Won | |
| 2022 | Reiwa Anisong Awards | Newcomer Award | "Koi no Yukue" by Akari Akase | Nominated | |
| 2022 | AT-X | Top Anime Ranking | My Dress-Up Darling | 2nd place | |
| 2023 | D Anime Store Awards | Heart-Pounding Anime | My Dress-Up Darling | Won | |
| 2023 | 7th Crunchyroll Anime Awards | Best Main Character | Marin Kitagawa | Nominated | |
| 2023 | 7th Crunchyroll Anime Awards | "Must Protect at All Costs" Character | Marin Kitagawa | Nominated | |
| 2023 | 7th Crunchyroll Anime Awards | Best Comedy | My Dress-Up Darling | Nominated | |
| 2023 | 7th Crunchyroll Anime Awards | Best Romance | My Dress-Up Darling | Nominated | |
| 2023 | 7th Crunchyroll Anime Awards | Best New Series | My Dress-Up Darling | Nominated | |
| 2023 | 7th Crunchyroll Anime Awards | Best Character Design | Kazumasa Ishida | Nominated | |
| 2023 | 7th Crunchyroll Anime Awards | Best Ending Sequence | "Koi no Yukue" by Akari Akase | Nominated | |
| 2023 | 7th Crunchyroll Anime Awards | Best Voice Artist Performance (English) | AmaLee as Marin Kitagawa | Nominated | |
| 2023 | 7th Crunchyroll Anime Awards | Best Voice Artist Performance (Arabic) | Ula Zidan as Marin Kitagawa | Nominated | |
| 2023 | 7th Crunchyroll Anime Awards | Best Voice Artist Performance (German) | Gabrielle Pietermann as Marin Kitagawa | Nominated | |
| 2023 | 7th Crunchyroll Anime Awards | Best Voice Artist Performance (Italian) | Deborah Morese as Marin Kitagawa | Nominated | |
| 2023 | 7th Crunchyroll Anime Awards | Best Voice Artist Performance (Spanish) | Erika Langarica as Marin Kitagawa | Nominated | |
| 2025 | AT-X | Top Anime Ranking | My Dress-Up Darling | 4th place | |
| 2026 | Tokyo Anime Award Festival | Best Animator | Shūto Enomoto | Won | |
| 2026 | Reiwa Anisong Awards | Composition Award | "Ao to Kirameki" by Spira Spica (Note: Hiroshi Seiki is credited as the nominee.) | Won | |
| 2026 | 10th Crunchyroll Anime Awards | Best Comedy | My Dress-Up Darling Season 2 | Nominated | |
| 2026 | 10th Crunchyroll Anime Awards | Best Romance | My Dress-Up Darling Season 2 | Nominated | |
| 2026 | 10th Crunchyroll Anime Awards | Best Slice of Life | My Dress-Up Darling Season 2 | Nominated | |
| 2026 | 10th Crunchyroll Anime Awards | Best Character Design | Kazumasa Ishida | Nominated | |
| 2026 | 10th Crunchyroll Anime Awards | Best Ending Sequence | "Kawaii Kaiwai" by PiKi | Nominated | |
| 2026 | 10th Crunchyroll Anime Awards | Best Voice Artist Performance (Spanish) | Erika Langarica as Marin Kitagawa | Nominated | |
| 2026 | Japan Expo Awards | Daruma for Best Romance Anime | My Dress-Up Darling Season 2 | Nominated | |
| 2026 | Japan Expo Awards | Daruma for Best Ending | "Kawaii Kaiwai" by PiKi | Nominated | |
| 2026 | 21st AnimaniA Awards | Best TV Sequel Series: Online | My Dress-Up Darling Season 2 | Nominated | |
| 2026 | 16th Newtype Anime Awards | Best Work (TV/Streaming) | My Dress-Up Darling Season 2 | 5th place | |
| 2026 | 16th Newtype Anime Awards | Best Character (Male) | Wakana Gojo | 5th place | |
| 2026 | 16th Newtype Anime Awards | Best Character (Female) | Marin Kitagawa | 2nd place | |
| 2026 | 16th Newtype Anime Awards | Best Director | Keisuke Shinohara | 4th place | |
| 2026 | 16th Newtype Anime Awards | Best Character Design | Kazumasa Ishida | 5th place | |
| 2026 | 16th Newtype Anime Awards | Best Screenplay | Yoriko Tomita | 5th place | |
