= Marin Kitagawa =

My Dress-Up Darling character

- My Dress-Up Darling character
- Marin as she appears in the anime adaptation
- First appearance: "My Dress-Up Darling Chapter 1"; November 24, 2018
- Created by: Shinichi Fukuda
- Portrayed by: Riko Nagase (live action drama)
- Voiced by: Japanese: Hina Suguta; English: AmaLee

In-universe information
- Gender: Female
- Occupation: First-year high school student; Model
- Relatives: Wakana Gojo (husband)
- Nationality: Japanese

Marin Kitagawa (Japanese: 喜多川 海夢, Hepburn: Kitagawa Marin) is a fictional character and the female main protagonist of the manga series My Dress-Up Darling, written and illustrated by Shinichi Fukuda. She is a first-year high school student and model. Marin is shown to dislike overly critical people who judge others based on their interests. She is a huge fan of anime, and her entire bedroom is decorated with anime posters and merchandise.

After wearing a series of cosplays made by her newly found friend Wakana, Marin grows closer to him and eventually develops feelings for him. She invites him to multiple places to spend time with him, so they can grow even closer.

== Creation and conception ==
Manga artist Shinichi Fukuda wanted to create a character who would not be the standard "tsundere" or "perfect waifu", but rather someone who was passionate, lively, and supportive. Fukuda repeatedly mentioned she was inspired by real girls who were passionate about cosplay and anime, as well as her respect for creative hobbies and her own experiences as a cosplayer. She wanted to create a heroine who broke female character stereotypes in romance manga. Fukuda conceived Marin Kitagawa as a gyaru who has an extroverted and kind personality. She is energetic and proactive, but clumsy with details and not particularly skilled at work. She is friendly and respectful of others. Marin works as a model and is knowledgeable about styles, makeup, and expression through appearance and photography.

The voice actor for Marin in Japanese, Hina Suguta, expressed that she found it challenging to play the role, particularly when channeling her emotions. She moved her body around when recording to help convey Marin's energy, finding herself very hungry after recording her lines from the effort needed.

== Reception ==
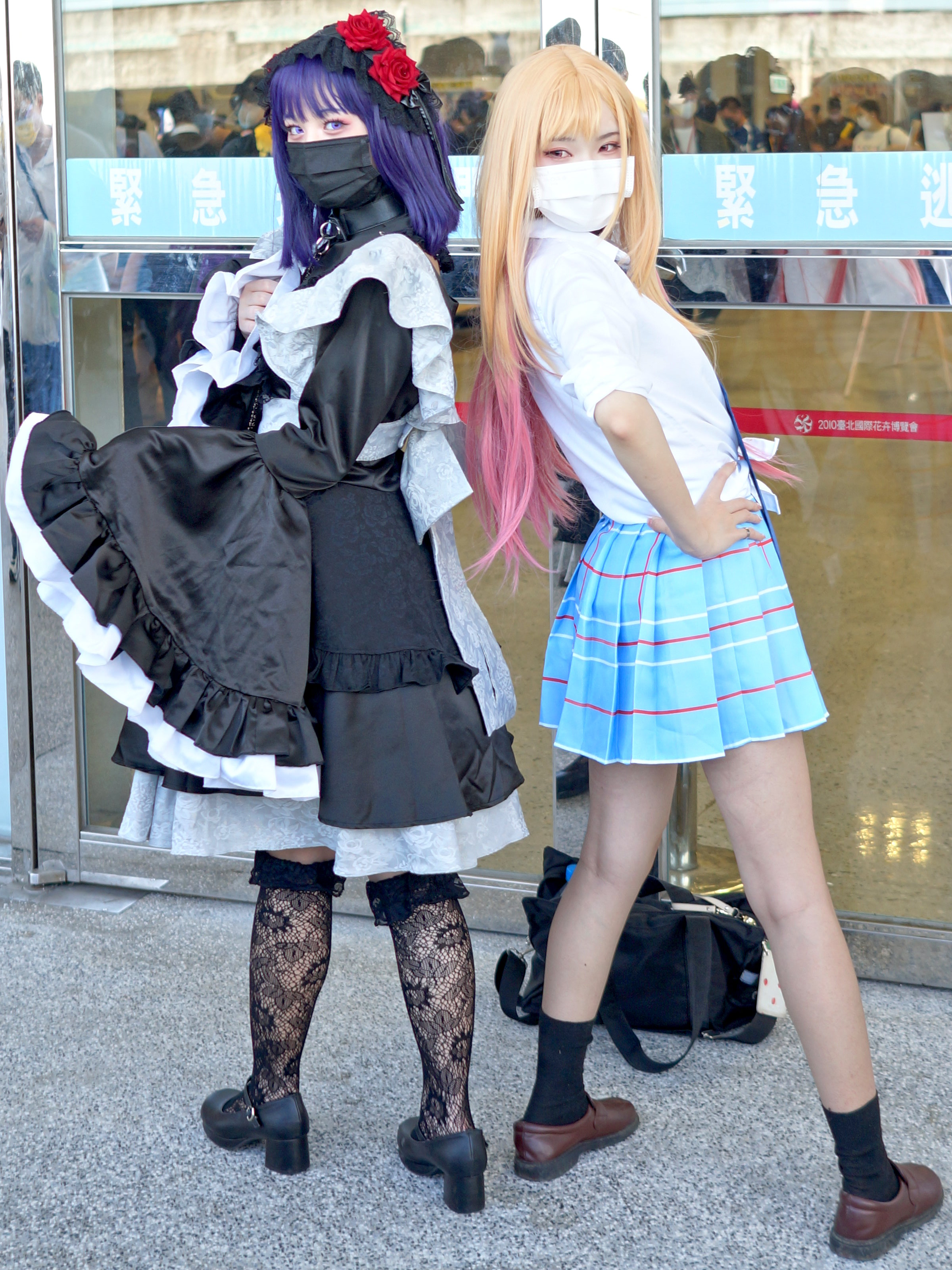
Cosplayers dressed as Marin Kitagawa

Marin placed first in Anime Corner's "Best Girl of Winter 2022 Season", garnering 8.99% of the votes. In the 2022 Anime Grand Prix, Marin took fifth place for Best Female Character. She ranked seventh in the same category at the 12th Newtype Anime Awards. In the 2023 Magademy Award, Marin received the award in the "Best Leading Actress" category, which is given to manga characters. In the AnimeClick.it Neko Awards 2023, Marin won the Best Waifu award with 52.62% from 261 voters. At the 7th Crunchyroll Anime Awards, Marin was nominated for "Best Main Character" and "Must Protect At All Costs" Character. Five of Marin's international voice actors were nominated for the "Best Voice Artist Performance" category, namely AmaLee (English), Ula Zidan (Arabic), Gabrielle Pietermann (German), Deborah Morese (Italian), and Erika Langarica (Spanish); however, they lost to Zach Aguilar's David Martinez, Amal Hajiwa's Gon Freecss, René Dawn-Claude's Satoru Gojo, Elisa Giorgio's Maki Zen'in, and Alejandro Orozco's Gyutaro, respectively. At the 10th edition, Erika Langarica was nominated again in the Spanish voice acting category for her character's portrayal.

Japanese model and influencer Akari Akase cosplaying as Marin was widely featured on television and social media platforms, making Marin famous beyond the traditional anime audience. Marin's image has inspired many cosplayers since the manga's premiere; renowned costume designer Nymphahri shared her vision of the schoolgirl, recreating some of the character's signature poses.

In an interview, director Keisuke Shinohara called Marin "a character we haven't seen before," noting her unique position as a girl who is the first to confess her love, which resonated particularly strongly with female viewers.

The Times of India described the series as "from niche to global phenomenon," where Marin became "a massive favorite among cosplayers and anime fans."
