= Kōkō Jidai ni Gōman Datta Joō-sama to no Dōsei Seikatsu wa Igai to Igokochi ga Waruku Nai =

Japanese light novel series

- First light novel volume cover

高校時代に傲慢だった女王様との同棲生活は意外と居心地が悪くない
- Genre: Romantic comedy
- Novel series
- Written by: Misoneta Dozaemon
- Published by: Shōsetsuka ni Narō
- Original run: April 1, 2023 – present
- Light novel
- Written by: Misoneta Dozaemon
- Illustrated by: Yugaa
- Published by: Shueisha
- Imprint: Dash X Bunko
- Original run: January 25, 2024 – present
- Volumes: 5
- Manga
- Written by: Misoneta Dozaemon
- Illustrated by: Ritsu Togawa
- Published by: Shueisha
- Imprint: Young Jump Comics
- Magazine: Dash X Comic
- Original run: December 12, 2024 – present
- Volumes: 5

Kōkō Jidai ni Gōman Datta Joō-sama to no Dōsei Seikatsu wa Igai to Igokochi ga Waruku Nai (Note: Japanese: 高校時代に傲慢だった女王様との同棲生活は意外と居心地が悪くない) is a Japanese light novel series written by Misoneta Dozaemon and illustrated by Yugaa. It was originally serialized as a web novel on the online publication platform Shōsetsuka ni Narō in April 2023, before Shueisha began publishing it as a light novel under their Dash X Bunko imprint in January 2024. Five volumes have been published as of May 2026. A manga adaptation illustrated by Ritsu Togawa began serialization on the Niconico platform's Niconico Manga service under Shueisha's Dash X Comic brand in December 2024, and has been compiled into five volumes as of November 2026.

== Plot ==
Yamamoto, a university student living alone, was once in a different world from Megumi Hayashi, his popular classmate. Notorious for rejecting confessions, she became known as the "Queen" due to her sharp tongue. Having lost contact with her after graduating, Yamamoto is suddenly reunited with her when she shops at the convenience store he was working at. Noticing that she was wearing long-sleeved clothing despite it being summer, she confesses that she was being abused by her boyfriend and had dropped out of university. Despite her initially cold reaction towards their reunion, he offers her to live with him. With her accepting, the two start their cohabitation.

== Characters ==
Yamamoto (山本)
A university student who works part-time at a convenience store. He was classmates with Megumi in high school but was never close to her due to her personality and popularity. However, after he finds out her boyfriend is abusing her, he offers her to live with him in the meantime.
Megumi Hayashi (林 恵, Hayashi Megumi)
Voiced by: Hina Suguta (ASMR)
Yamamoto's former classmate, who comes to live with him. She was the most popular and beautiful girl in school, but was nicknamed "Queen" due to her arrogant personality. She starts living with Yamamoto after escaping from her abusive boyfriend. She is on bad terms with her parents due to her relationship, which also led her to drop out of university.
Kasahara (笠原)
Megumi's high school best friend. She and Yamamoto dated in high school.

== Media ==
=== Light novel ===
The series is written by Misoneta Dozaemon and originally began serialization on the online publication platform Shōsetsuka ni Narō on April 1, 2023. It was later picked up for publication by Shueisha, which began publishing it as a light novel under their Dash X Bunko imprint with illustrations by Yugaa. The first volume was released on January 25, 2024; five volumes have been released as of May 22, 2026.

No.	Release date	ISBN
1	January 25, 2024	978-4-08-631537-1
2	July 25, 2024	978-4-08-631561-6
3	March 25, 2025	978-4-08-631596-8
4	October 24, 2025	978-4-08-631623-1
5	May 22, 2026	978-4-08-631653-8

=== Manga ===
A manga adaptation illustrated by Ritsu Togawa and featuring storyboards by Akira Yūki began serialization on the Niconico platform's Niconico Manga service under Shueisha's Dash X Comic brand on December 12, 2024. The first tankōbon volume was released on May 19, 2025; five volumes have been released as of November 18, 2026.

No.	Release date	ISBN
1	May 19, 2025	978-4-08-893716-8
2	September 19, 2025	978-4-08-893766-3
3	February 19, 2026	978-4-08-893875-2
4	July 17, 2026	978-4-08-894160-8
5	November 18, 2026	978-4-08-894366-4

=== Other ===
An ASMR product featuring Hina Suguta as Megumi Hayashi was released on February 19, 2026.

== Reception ==
The manga adaptation ranked highly in a list of the top manga on the Niconico platform for the first half of 2025, ranking first in the official serializations category and the sales category.
