= AmaLee =

American singer (born 1992)

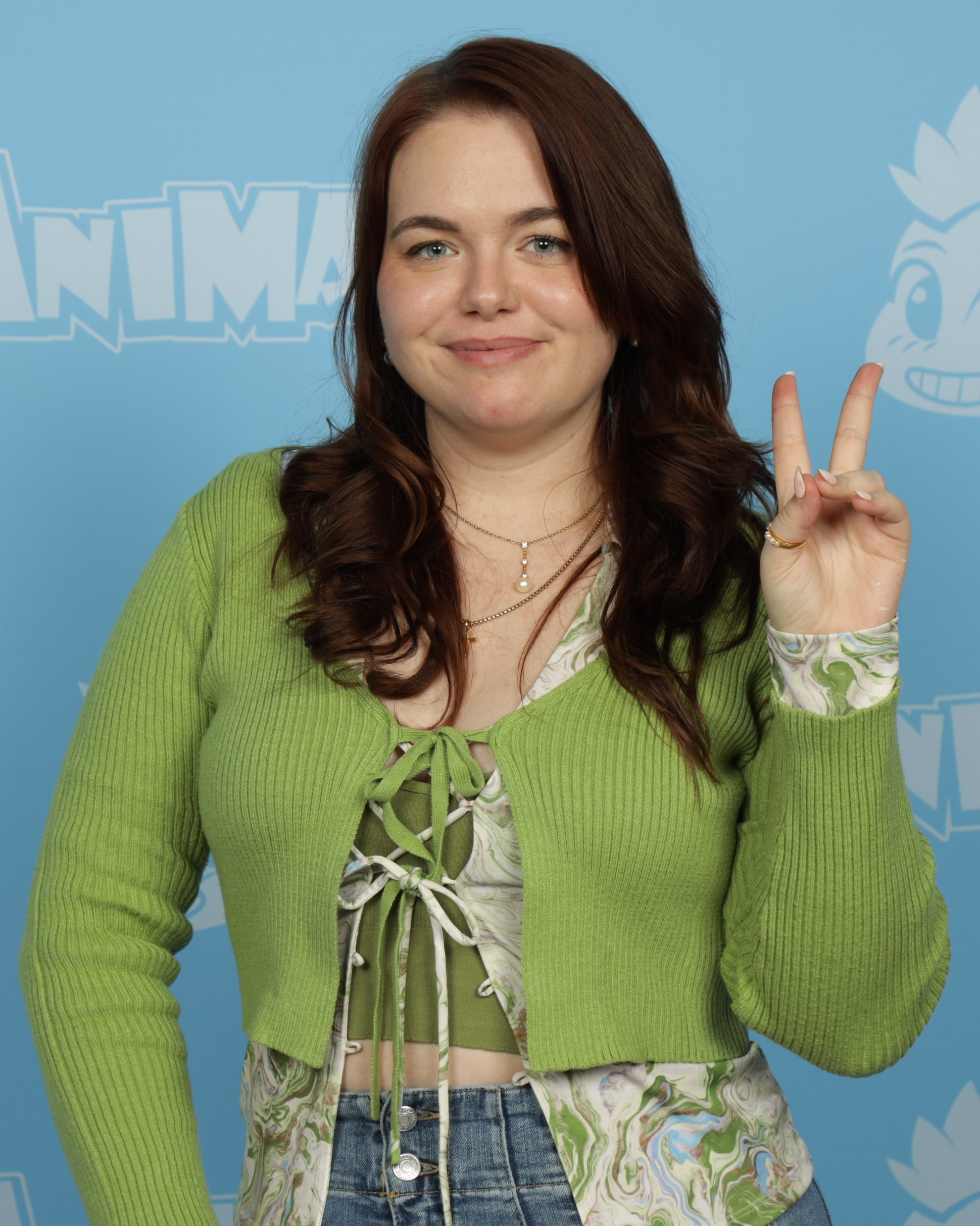
- AmaLee in 2023

Background information
- Also known as: AmaLee; Monarch; LeeandLie
- Born: Amanda Lee; March 13, 1992 (age 34)
- Genres: Alternative rock; pop; anison
- Occupations: Singer; voice actress; YouTuber; VTuber
- Instrument: Vocals
- Years active: 2006–present
- Website: www.leeandlie.com

Twitch information
- Channel: AmaLee
- Years active: 2021–present
- Genre: Gaming
- Followers: 507.3 thousand

YouTube information
- Channel: LeeandLie
- Subscribers: 2.45 million
- Views: 1.27 billion
- Last updated: February 19, 2026

Amanda Lee (born March 13, 1992), also known as AmaLee, is an American singer, voice actress, YouTuber, and virtual YouTuber (VTuber) under the name Monarch. She is known for her English covers of anime and Japanese video game songs on YouTube, which have been viewed over 1 billion times and has acquired her over 2 million subscribers. As a voice actress, AmaLee has provided her voice in several titles such as Dragon Ball Xenoverse 2, Kaguya-sama: Love Is War, Rio: Rainbow Gate!, SSSS.Dynazenon, Kageki Shojo!!, Girls' Frontline, Otherside Picnic, Adachi and Shimamura, My Dress-Up Darling, Aokana: Four Rhythm Across the Blue, One Piece Film: Red, Honkai: Star Rail, and My Singing Monsters.

AmaLee has also provided vocals for many independent video game soundtracks and theme songs – including a collaboration with Porter Robinson on "Fellow Feeling". In early 2017, she released her debut album, Nostalgia, which brought together English-language versions of 12 songs beloved by gaming and anime fans. The album charted at No. 6 on Billboard Heatseekers Albums, No. 27 on Billboard Independent Albums, No. 43 on Billboard Top Rock Albums, and No. 12 on UK Independent Album Breakers.

== Career ==
In 2006, AmaLee began posting homemade videos of her covers of tunes popular with anime followers and gamers. Later in 2010, she and her friend Annalie created YouTube channel called LeeandLie. According to AmaLee, their channel name is a combination of "Lee" from her name, and "Lie" from her friend Annalie's name. On December 14, 2010, LeeandLie uploaded their first video, a cover of the song "Scarlet" from the anime Ayashi no Ceres, translated and performed by AmaLee.

In 2011, AmaLee joined AX Idol, a singing competition hosted by Bang Zoom! Entertainment and Viz Media, affiliated with Anime Expo, a convention for anime fans held annually in Los Angeles and won the grand prize. Since then, she has also had the occupation of providing her voice to shows and titles such as Dragon Ball Xenoverse 2, One Piece, Yandere Simulator, Gosick, Rio: Rainbow Gate!, K-On!, and Show by Rock!!, among others. Amanda has also provided vocals for many independent video game soundtracks and theme songs – including a collaboration with Porter Robinson. She is also known for singing the English version of "Lagrima", the eleventh ending theme of Dragon Ball Super.

On September 2, 2012, they uploaded their most viewed video, a cover of the song "Crossing Field" from the anime Sword Art Online, with over 23 million views as of July 2022. In 2014, Annalie left the channel, leaving it the sole property of AmaLee, though the channel name remains "LeeandLie".

On January 7, 2017, she released her first album, Nostalgia, which brought together English-language versions of 12 songs beloved by gaming and anime fans. The album charted at No. 6 on Billboard Heatseekers Albums, No. 27 on Billboard Independent Albums, and No. 43 on Billboard Top Rock Albums. On September 22, 2017, she released an EP titled Hourglass which contains five original songs.

In July 2017, Lee performed in Los Angeles Convention Center as part of the 2017 Anime Expo. On August 22, 2017, it was announced that AmaLee would be joining YouTube stars NateWantsToBattle and MandoPony on "The Cool and Good Tour" across America. AmaLee provides vocals and lyrics on multiplayer online battle arena game League of Legends 2019 Ranked Season trailer.

On December 11, 2021, AmaLee debuted as her own new VTuber character named "Monarch" on Twitch. On January 26, 2025, it was announced that she joined the VTuber talent agency VShojo, before terminating her contract six months later amid various controversies with the agency.

In July 2026, Amalee, alongside Ironmouse, Dokibird, and Rin Penrose, announced the launch of their music project The Wildcard Club during OffKai Expo with creative support from Hybe, which serves as platform supporting independent VTubers for live performances, music video, original songs and album production.

== Discography ==
=== Studio albums ===
==== Cover albums ====
Title	Album details	Peak chart positions		
Title	Album details	US Heat	US Ind	US Rock
Total Coverage, Vol. 1	Released: September 13, 2016; Label: Leegion Creative; Format: Digital download	—	—	—
Total Coverage, Vol. 2	Released: November 9, 2016; Label: Leegion Creative; Format: Digital download	—	—	—
Nostalgia	Released: January 7, 2017; Label: Leegion Creative; Format: Digital download	6	27	43
Total Coverage, Vol. 3	Released: June 26, 2017; Label: Leegion Creative; Format: Digital download	—	—	—
Nostalgia II	Released: October 6, 2017; Label: Leegion Creative; Format: Digital download	—	—	—
Nostalgia III	Released: January 18, 2018; Label: Leegion Creative; Format: Digital download	—	—	—
Total Coverage, Vol. 4	Released: April 3, 2018; Label: Leegion Creative; Format: Digital download	—	—	—
Nostalgia IV	Released: April 25, 2018; Label: Leegion Creative; Format: Digital download	—	—	—
Nostalgia V	Released: September 8, 2018; Label: Leegion Creative; Format: Digital download	9	36	—
Nostalgia VI	Released: March 13, 2019; Label: Leegion Creative; Formats: CD (limited), digital download	20	—	—
Nostalgia VII	Released: December 1, 2019; Label: Leegion Creative; Formats: CD (limited), digital download	9	—	—
Unity	Released: August 5, 2020; Label: Leegion Creative; Format: Digital download	—	—	—
Total Coverage, Vol. 5	Released: October 10, 2020; Label: Leegion Creative	—	—	—
Total Coverage, Vol. 6	Released: December 10, 2020; Label: Leegion Creative	—	—	—
The Remixes	Released: January 15, 2021; Label: Leegion Creative	—	—	—
Equivalence	Released: June 18, 2021; Label: Leegion Creative; Format: CD (limited), digital download	—	—	—

==== Original album ====
Title	Album details	Peak chart positions		
Title	Album details	US Heat	US Ind	US Rock
Rise of the Monarch	Released: June 24, 2022; Label: Leegion Creative; Formats: CD, digital download	—	—	—

=== Extended plays ===
==== Original EP ====
Title	EP details	Peak chart positions		
Title	EP details	US Heat	US Ind	US Rock
Hourglass	Released: September 22, 2017; Label: Leegion Creative; Formats: CD, digital download	—	—	—

==== Cover EP ====
Title	EP details	Peak chart positions		
Title	EP details	US Heat	US Ind	US Rock
Link Start	Released: March 30, 2016; Label: Leegion Creative; Format: Digital download	12	39	—

=== Guest appearances ===
List of non-single guest appearances with other performing artists
Title	Year	Album
"Fellow Feeling"	2014	Worlds
"Satellites"	2023	Over Zone (Goddess of Victory: Nikke Original Soundtrack)

== Filmography ==
=== Anime ===
List of dubbing performances in anime
Year	Title	Role	Notes	Ref.
2009	Charger Girl Ju-den Chan	Chiiko		
2010	K-On!	Ushio Oota		
2010	Squid Girl	Noh Mask Rider		
2014	Charger Girl, Ju-den Chan	Chiiko		
2015	Ladies versus Butlers!	Sakurako Benikouji		
2016	Show by Rock!!	Peipain		
2016	Rio: Rainbow Gate!	Elle Adams		
2016	Magical Girl Raising Project	Nemurin		
2016	World War Blue	Fae		
2017	Gosick	The Orphan		
2018	One Piece	Otohime		
2018	Junji Ito Collection	Midori		
2018	Overlord II	Crusch Lulu		
2018	Cardcaptor Sakura: Clear Card	Akiho Shinomoto		
2018	The Master of Ragnarok & Blesser of Einherjar	Rune		
2018	Kakuriyo: Bed and Breakfast for Spirits	Kasuga		
2018	Anonymous Noise	Miou Suguri		
2018	Harukana Receive	Female Student 5B	Ep. 5	
2018	Grimoire of Zero	Zero		
2018	Hinamatsuri	Anzu		
2018	Zombie Land Saga	Junko Konno		
2018	Black Clover	Luca	Eps. 30, 32, 35–36	
2018	Aokana: Four Rhythm Across the Blue	Saki Inui		
2018	A Certain Magical Index III	Itsuwa		
2018	Conception	Femiruna		
2018	UQ Holder!	Kirië Sakurame		
2018	Ulysses: Jeanne d'Arc and the Alchemist Knight	Myriam		
2018	Lord of Vermilion: The Crimson King	Tsubasa Tachikaze		
2019	Boogiepop and Others	Female Student D	Episode "Boogiepop and Others 1"	
2019	Endro!	Yulia "Yuusha" Chardiet		
2019	Hakumei and Mikochi	Mikochi		
2019	Pop Team Epic	Pipimi	Ep. 14	
2019	Fruits Basket	Yuki Soma (child)	2019 series	
2019	Kemono Friends	Princess		
2019	Azur Lane	Shiratsuyu		
2019	Arifureta: From Commonplace to World's Strongest	Shea Haulia		
2019	YU-NO: A Girl Who Chants Love at the Bound of this World	Sayless	2019 anime	
2020	Kaguya-sama: Love Is War	Ai Hayasaka		
2020	My Hero Academia	Bibimi Kenranzaki	Season 4	
2020	RWBY	Stepsisters	Season 8	
2020	Adachi and Shimamura	Hougetsu Shimamura		
2021	Tamayomi	Yoshino Kawaguchi/Ibuki Kawaguchi		
2021	Kuma Kuma Kuma Bear	Noire Foschurose		
2021	Attack on Titan	Louise	Season 4	
2021	Bottom-tier Character Tomozaki	Erika Konno		
2021	SSSS.Dynazenon	Ranka		
2021	That Time I Got Reincarnated as a Slime	Velzard		
2021	Kageki Shojo!!	Kaoru Hoshino		
2021	The Detective is Already Dead	Matsuri Natsuiro	Ep. 3	
2021	Pokémon Evolutions	Lillie		
2021	Otherside Picnic	Akari Seto		
2021	Mieruko-chan	Morino		
2022	Girls' Frontline	FNC		
2022	Odd Taxi	Rui Nikaidо		
2022	The Dawn of the Witch	Zero		
2022–2025	My Dress-Up Darling	Marin Kitagawa	Lead Role	
2022–2025	A Couple of Cuckoos	Hiro Segawa		
2023	A Place Further than the Universe	Yuzuki Shiraishi		

=== Animation ===
List of voice performances in animation
Year	Title	Role	Notes	Ref.
2026	Gameoverse	Scratch		

=== Films ===
List of dubbing performances in films
Year	Title	Role	Notes	Ref.
2018	Hells	Rinne Amagane		
2022	One Piece Film: Red	Uta		
2023	Sword Art Online Progressive: Scherzo of Deep Night	Liten		
2024	Mobile Suit Gundam SEED Freedom	Ingrid Tradoll		

=== Video games ===
List of voice performances in video games
Year	Title	Role	Notes	Ref.
2012	Burn Your Fat with Me!! V4.0	Sana Yamada	Voice over & theme song performer "Equation of Happiness" (English ver)	
2013	Battle High 2	Michelle Walter		
2014–present	Yandere Simulator	Megami Saikou		
2016	Dragon Ball Xenoverse 2	Time Patroller	Female Voice 12	
2016	ACE Academy	Mei Satomi, herself	Voice over	
2017	Project Nimbus	Yuliana Alexandrova		
2017	The Letter	Isabella Santos	Voice over & theme song performer "Letters Goodbye"	
2017	Crystalline	Leanna Dawn	Voice over & theme song performer "Crystal Skies"	
2018	Project Nimbus: Code Mirai	Yuliana Alexandrova		
2019	Love Esquire	Beatrice Du Cae		
2019	Indivisible	Leilani		
2020	Dragon Ball Z: Kakarot	Additional Voices		
2021	Final Fantasy VII: The First Soldier	Female Voice #B		
2021	Cookie Run: Kingdom	Parfait Cookie	Voice over & theme song performer "Everything You Need"	
2021	World's End Club	Vanilla		
2021	Pokémon Masters EX	Lana		
2021	Aquadine	Elisabeth Rhodes		
2021	Dark Deity	Bianca		
2021	Rival Threads: Last Class Heroes	Rara Goddard		
2021	Mary Skelter: Nightmares	Pyre		
2022	Fire Emblem Heroes	Elimine		
2022	Dawn of the Monsters	Claire Lionne		
2022	AI: The Somnium Files – Nirvana Initiative	Kizuna		
2022	Goddess of Victory: Nikke	Rupee, Viper	Provided the voice of Viper until July 4, 2024. She is also no longer voicing Rupee as of update on date August, 7th 2025 per in game documentation, replaced by Rachelle Heger	
2022	RWBY: Arrowfell	Ivy Thickety		
2023	Octopath Traveler II	Dolcinaea		
2023	Honkai: Star Rail	Jingliu		
2024	Persona 3 Reload	Additional voices		
2024	The Legend of Heroes: Trails Through Daybreak	Agnès Claudel		
2024	Romancing SaGa 2: Revenge of the Seven	Windy/Iris		
2025	The Legend of Heroes: Trails Through Daybreak II	Agnès Claudel, citizens		
2026	Final Fantasy Resonance	Sakura		
2026	The Legend of Heroes: Trails beyond the Horizon	Agnès Claudel		
2026	My Singing Monsters	AnomaLee	Confirmed via a Twitch stream she did on October 6th, 2026; showcasing them singing on Psychic Island as a Werdo monster. First non-Japanese video game voice role.	

== Awards and nominations ==
Year	Award	Category	Work/Recipient	Result	Ref.
2023	7th Crunchyroll Anime Awards	Best Voice Artist Performance (English)	Marin Kitagawa (My Dress-Up Darling)	Nominated	
2023	The Vtuber Awards	Miss Vtuber	AmaLee	Nominated	
