= Trillion Game =

Japanese manga series

- First tankōbon volume cover

トリリオンゲーム (Toririon Gēmu)
- Genre: Adventure; Comedy drama
- Manga
- Written by: Riichiro Inagaki
- Illustrated by: Ryoichi Ikegami
- Published by: Shogakukan
- English publisher: NA: Viz Media
- Magazine: Big Comic Superior
- Original run: December 11, 2020 – December 12, 2025
- Volumes: 11
- Television drama
- Directed by: Yoshiaki Murao
- Produced by: Akiko Matsumoto; Hiromi Matsushita; Shoichi Kato
- Written by: Daisuke Habara
- Music by: Hideaki Kimura
- Studio: TBS Sparkle; TBS
- Licensed by: Netflix
- Original network: JNN (TBS)
- Original run: July 14, 2023 – September 15, 2023
- Episodes: 10
- Anime television series
- Directed by: Yuzo Sato
- Written by: Ryunosuke Kingetsu
- Music by: Takurō Iga
- Studio: Madhouse (Note: Animation production assistance (アニメーション制作協力) for all episodes provided by DR Movie.)
- Licensed by: Crunchyroll (streaming); SEA: Medialink
- Original network: TBS, AT-X, SUN, HBC, CBC, RKB, Tokyo MX, KBS Kyoto, BS11
- Original run: October 4, 2024 – March 28, 2025
- Episodes: 26
- Live-action film
- Directed by: Yoshiaki Murao
- Written by: Daisuke Habara
- Music by: Hideaki Kimura
- Studio: TBS Sparkle; Toho Studios
- Released: February 14, 2025
- Runtime: 118 minutes
- icon

Trillion Game (Japanese: トリリオンゲーム, Hepburn: Toririon Gēmu) is a Japanese manga series written by Riichiro Inagaki and illustrated by Ryoichi Ikegami. It was serialized in Shogakukan's seinen manga magazine Big Comic Superior from December 2020 to December 2025, with its chapters collected in eleven tankōbon volumes. It is licensed for English release in North America by Viz Media.

A television drama adaptation aired from July to September 2023. A sequel live-action film to the drama series premiered in February 2025. A 26-episode anime television series adaptation produced by Madhouse aired from October 2024 to March 2025.

The series won the 69th Shogakukan Manga Award in 2024.

== Plot ==
The founders of big company Trillion Game, Haru and Gaku, are two young men who become the first Japanese people in the 21st century to be listed in the top 10 of The World's Billionaires. The story takes place from Gaku's perspective, who recalls how he came this far: his first encounter with Haru, their first establishment of Trillion Game, and people who are involved with the success of the company.

== Characters ==
=== Main ===
Haru Tennōji (天王寺 陽, Tennōji Haru)
Voiced by: Takeo Ōtsuka (Japanese); Cody Savoie (English)
Portrayed by: Ren Meguro
The self-proclaimed "world's most selfish man" who aims to earn a trillion dollars by establishing Trillion Game. Haru is gifted with high communication skills, intelligence, and physical strength. He is good at negotiating, has an unmatched will to never give up, and will use any means necessary to achieve his goals. As co-founder of Trillion Game, he serves as its liaison, sales representative, and business decision maker.
He was once a part of Dragon Bank Enterprises, a large corporation runs by the Kokuryū, but quits after they refuse to hire Gaku. He values Gaku and his engineering ability and would support him anytime. His speciality dish is a large-portion spicy fried rice. He is multilingual; fluent in, including but not limited to, English, Chinese, and French.
It is still unknown why he is nowhere to be seen in the present timeline.
Manabu Taira (平 学, Taira Manabu) / Gaku (ガク)
Voiced by: Shōya Ishige (Japanese); Chase Kloza (English)
Portrayed by: Hayato Sano
The main narrator of the story, who established Trillion Game with Haru and serves as President of the company in the present timeline. Contrary to Haru, he is reclusive, timid, socially awkward, and weak-willed. His first encounter with Haru was when he saved Gaku from being bullied, where Haru found out about Gaku's talent. A computer otaku who, despite being self-taught, has a skill on par with professionals: he hacked into Dragon Bank's server and discovered a fault in the company's security system. He unintentionally admitted this during his job interview there, which caught Kirika's attention. His nickname "Gaku" is the result of the on'yomi reading of his first name.
One of his treasured asset is a ¥200,000 (around $1,300) office chair that Haru bought for him using their starting fund.
Kirika Kokuryū (黒龍 キリカ, Kokuryū Kirika) / Kirihime (桐姫)
Voiced by: M.A.O (Japanese); Katelyn Barr (English)
Portrayed by: Mio Imada
The board director of Dragon Bank and the only daughter of its President, Kazuma Kokuryū. She is nicknamed "Kirihime" by the media for her atmosphere and personality. While brilliant and calm, but she is also arrogant and irreverent, treating everyone around her in a business-like manner. Kirika likes people who "can do their job" and has a keen eye for people, as well as a selfish nature inherited from her father. She became obsessed with Haru and Gaku after witnessing what they are capable of and has been trying, unsuccessfully, to bring them under her control. Despite this, there are multiple times when she helps Haru and Gaku, thinking it's more fun that way.
Rinrin Takahashi (高橋 凜々, Takahashi Rinrin)
Voiced by: Yuki Tanaka
Portrayed by: Riko Fukumoto
The President of Trillion Game, who was only a college student when she was hired. She is known for being too stiff, which was a part of the failure in her job hunting. However, her personality makes her sensitive to even the tiniest detail, a trait neither Haru or Gaku possesses. Before joining Trillion Game, she worked part-timer at a flower shop, which helped her gain extensive knowledge about flowers. Using this, she posed as Trillion Game's then-fake AI system "Torinrin", offering consultations about flower arrangement through the company's online flower shop "Yorinuki". As an actual AI replaced her job and she graduated from college, Rinrin officially become the company's President.

=== Trillion Game related parties ===
Kazuki Kedōin (祁答院 一輝, Kedōin Kazuki)
Voiced by: Hiroki Tōchi
Portrayed by: Kōji Kikkawa
The President of Kedōin Venture capital, as well as Haru and Gaku's first investor. He always wears a cowboy hat, sunglasses, and leather shoes with heart and clover accessories on its soles. Despite his foul-mouthed personality, he is good at looking after his alliance.
He used to work as manager at a talent agency called God Production, but was forced to leave for covering up one of its talent's scandals, having his life temporarily ruined. After teaming up with Haru, he successfully took over the company and became its President.
Mizuki (水樹)
Voiced by: Shion Wakayama
Portrayed by: Akari Akase
A high school student who works part-time as Kedōin's assistant. She also appears in present timeline working for Gaku. She has sharp tongue and does not hesitate to speak up against Kedōin or Gaku.
In the live-action drama, she is always seen with sailor school uniform and has her first name revealed, being named Fūka (風華), whilst in the manga she has seen wearing other clothes and has only been called "Mizuki".
Shingo Sakura (桜 心護, Sakura Shingo)
Voiced by: Ryōta Suzuki
Portrayed by: Yoshitaka Hara
The former President of Sakusaku Lab, a small indie game company that Haru and Gaku acquired to rival Dragon Bank's big hit game Dragon Musume. He takes pride in game making, being described by his employer as someone who is "capable of making good games, but lack of talent to make hits", which caused all of his produced games to result in company loss. The company's first online game, Puchi Puchi Land, a remake of Shingo's first game, became a hit success after Trillion Game successfully employed Dragon Musume's former producer Hebijima into the company.
Futaba (二葉)
Voiced by: Sayaka Senbongi
Portrayed by: Seira Anzai
Nanamori (斜森)
Voiced by: Rikuya Yasuda
Portrayed by: Tomoya Maeno
Ogura (巨椋)
Voiced by: Yuuki Shin
Portrayed by: Daichi Kodaira

=== Dragon Bank related parties ===
Kazuma Kokuryū (黒龍 一真, Kokuryū Kazuma)
Voiced by: Takaya Hashi
Portrayed by: Jun Kunimura
The president of Dragon Bank and Kirika's father. Selfish just like his daughter, he desires for control and ownership of anything that gets in the way of his business. He confessed that he does not like fighting his rivals, and would rather buy them out or completely crush them. After the success of Trillion Game's online flower shop catches his attention, he began to imitate all of Trillion Game's business ventures, offers a large sum of money to buy the company, and even asked Haru to marry his daughter in order to make him part of Kokuryū.
Nagase (長瀬)
Voiced by: Masaaki Mizunaka
Portrayed by: Terunosuke Takezai
Kirika's personal bodyguard and assistant who always looks irritated whenever Haru and Gaku approach her. His first name Tadanori (忠則) was never revealed in the manga.
Tōru Hebijima (蛇島 透, Hebijima Tōru)
Voiced by: Toshihiko Seki

=== Others ===
Sumeragi (皇)
Voiced by: Masaki Terasoma
Akari Shirotora (白虎 あかり, Shirotora Akari)
Voiced by: Lynn
Kunugi (功刀)
Voiced by: Kenjiro Tsuda
Portrayed by: Kenjiro Tsuda

== Media ==
=== Manga ===
Written by Riichiro Inagaki and illustrated by Ryoichi Ikegami, Trillion Game was serialized in Shogakukan's seinen manga magazine Big Comic Superior from December 11, 2020, to December 12, 2025. Shogakukan has collected its chapters into eleven tankōbon volumes, released from March 30, 2021, to January 30, 2026.

In February 2024, Viz Media announced that they licensed the manga for English publication on September 17 of the same year.

==== Volumes ====
No.	Original release date	Original ISBN	English release date	English ISBN
1	March 30, 2021	978-4-09-861010-5	September 17, 2024	978-1-9747-4972-0
1. "The Greediest Men in the World" (世界一のワガママ, Sekai Ichi no Wagamama); 2. "Start-Up"; 3. "Million Game"; 4. "Kirihime Fishing" (桐姫フィッシング, Kirihime Fisshingu); 5. "But You'll Win" (お前なら勝つだろ, Omae Nara Katsudaro); 6. "Tag Team" (タッグ, Taggu); 7. "Bad Man" (ワルい男, Warī Otoko)
2	August 4, 2021	978-4-09-861113-3	November 19, 2024	978-1-9747-4997-3
8. "Running Start" (スタートダッシュ, Sutāto Dasshu); 9. "The Gaze of a Maiden" (乙女の眼差し, Otome no Manazashi); 10. "Want You to the Moon" (月まで欲しくて, Tsuki Made Hoshikute); 11. "So We Started a Company" (株式会社はじめました, Kabushikigaisha Hajimemashita); 12. "Trillion Game Inc." (株式会社トリリオンゲーム, Kabushikigaisha Toririon Gēmu); 13. "First Business" (最初のビジネス, Saisho no Bijinesu); 14. "MVP"; 15. "Blooms and Blossoms" (花と華, Hana to Hana)
3	January 4, 2022	978-4-09-861228-4	January 21, 2025	978-1-9747-5172-3
16. "Flowery Runway of Kabukicho" (歌舞伎の華道, Kabuki no Hana-michi); 17. "Flowery Star of Kabukicho" (歌舞伎の華形, Kabuki no Hanagata); 18. "Imperial March" (帝国の行進, Teikoku no Kōshin); 19. "Golden Egg"; 20. "The Man of Illusions" (幻の男, Maboroshi no Otoko); 21. "Who's Bad?"; 22. "Two Bad Men" (ワルがふたり, Waru ga Futari); 23. "Trillion Actor" (一兆両役者, Ittōryō Yakusha)
4	July 4, 2022	978-4-09-861320-5	March 18, 2025	978-1-9747-5214-0
24. "Battle at Budokan" (決戦武道館, Kessen Budōkan); 25. "Bonding Through Games" (ゲームの絆, Gēmu no Kizuna); 26. "Haru vs. Gaku" (ハルVS.ガク, Haru VS. Gaku); 27. "Gray Hacker"; 28. "With You"; 29. "One-on-One"; 30. "I Love Money"; 31. "Headhunt"
5	October 28, 2022	978-4-09-861456-1	May 20, 2025	978-1-9747-5481-6
32. "Unstoppable Haru" (ハル無双, Haru Musō); 33. "Sacrifice Needed" (王貞はるか, Ō Sada Haruka); 34. "Tech Ritual" (ITの壺, Aitī no Tsubo); 35. "Million Power"; 36. "Staring at the Sky from the Peak" (頂より空を見て, Itadaki Yori Sora o Mite); 37. "The Reward for Victory" (勝利の報酬, Shōri no Hōshū); 38. "The Glory of the Reward" (報酬の栄冠, Hōshū no Eikan); 39. "The Cost of Glory" (栄光の対価, Eikō no Taika)
6	March 30, 2023	978-4-09-861605-3	July 15, 2025	978-1-9747-5527-1
40. "The Dragon King's Palm" (竜王の掌, Ryūō no Tenohira); 41. "Pissed" (ムカついて, Mukatsuite); 42. "All In"; 43. "Our Game"; 44. "Media Wars"; 45. "Queen's Game"; 46. "Big News"; 47. "I Love the News"
7	July 12, 2023	978-4-09-861853-8	September 16, 2025	978-1-9747-5844-9
48. "Sicko Gamers" (最高のゲーマー, Saikō no Gēmā); 49. "Money Collar" (マネーの首輪, Manē no Kubiwa); 50. "Even as an Empty Box" (今は空箱でも, Ima wa Karabako Demo); 51. "Game Changer"; 52. "Declaration of War" (宣戦布告, Sensen Fukoku); 53. "Strong and Weak Points"; 54. "I Want It All"; 55. "Hustler"
8	November 30, 2023	978-4-09-862626-7	November 18, 2025	978-1-9747-5907-1
9	April 30, 2024	978-4-09-862691-5	January 20, 2026	978-1-9747-6191-3
10	February 14, 2025	978-4-09-863035-6	March 17, 2026	978-1-9747-6237-8
11	January 30, 2026	978-4-09-863662-4	December 22, 2026	978-1-9747-6920-9

=== Live-action ===
A television drama adaptation was announced on March 23, 2023. The series stars Ren Meguro as Haru Tennōji and Hayato Sano as Manabu "Gaku" Taira, and aired on TBS from July 14 to September 15, 2023. Snow Man performs the theme song "Dangerholic." The drama began streaming on Netflix worldwide in October 2023.

A live-action film, a sequel to the drama series, featuring the same staff and cast, premiered on February 14, 2025. The film's theme song is "SBY", performed by Snow Man.

=== Anime ===
An anime television series adaptation was announced in September 2023. It was produced by Madhouse and directed by Yuzo Sato, with Ryunosuke Kingetsu overseeing series scripts, Kei Tsuchiya designing the characters, and Takurō Iga composing the music. The series aired from October 4, 2024, to March 28, 2025, on TBS and other networks, (Note: TBS listed the series premiere on October 3, 2024, at 25:58, which is effectively October 4 at 1:58 a.m. JST.) For the first cours, the opening theme song is "Beat the Odds", performed by &Team, while the ending theme song is "Unbelievable" (アンビリーバブル, Anbirībaburu), performed by Klang Ruler. For the second cours, the opening theme song is "Over the Top", performed by Hiroji Miyamoto, while the ending theme song is "Egoist", performed by imase.

Crunchyroll streams the series outside of Asia, with an English dub premiered on October 17, 2024. Medialink licensed the series in Southeast, South, and Central Asia, and Oceania (except Australia and New Zealand) for streaming on Ani-One Asia's YouTube channel.

==== Episodes ====
No.	Title	Directed by	Written by	Storyboarded by	Original release date
1	"The World's Most Selfish Man"; Transliteration: "Sekai Ichi no Wagamama" (Japanese: 世界一のワガママ)	Kim Min-sun	Ryunosuke Kingetsu	Yuzo Sato	October 4, 2024 (Note: Episodes 1 and 2 premiered back-to-back.)
2	"Start Up"	Tōru Ishida & Kim Bong-deok	Ryunosuke Kingetsu	Yoshiaki Kawajiri	October 4, 2024
3	"You'll Win, Won't You?"; Transliteration: "Omae Nara Katsudaro" (Japanese: お前なら勝つだろ)	Tōru Ishida	Ryunosuke Kingetsu	Yuzo Sato	October 11, 2024
4	"A Bad Guy"; Transliteration: "Warī Otoko" (Japanese: ワルい男)	Kanji Wakabayashi & Hwang Il-jin	Mitsutaka Hirota	Kanji Wakabayashi	October 18, 2024
5	"The Maiden's Gaze"; Transliteration: "Otome no Manazashi" (Japanese: 乙女の眼差し)	Akiko Nakano & Kentaro Hori	Tomomi Kawaguchi	Yoshiaki Kawajiri	October 25, 2024
6	"I Want You To the Moon"; Transliteration: "Tsuki Made Hoshikute" (Japanese: 月まで欲しくて)	Akiko Nakano, Kim Min-sun & Kentaro Hori	Ryunosuke Kingetsu	Akiko Nakano	November 1, 2024
7	"Trillion Game, Inc."; Transliteration: "Kabushiki Gaisha Toririon Gēmu" (Japanese: 株式会社トリリオンゲーム)	Nobu Ishida & Kim Bong-Deok	Mitsutaka Hirota	Yoshiaki Kawajiri	November 8, 2024
8	"Flowers and Splendor"; Transliteration: "Hana to Hana" (Japanese: 花と華)	Kanji Wakabayashi & Kim Min-sun	Ryunosuke Kingetsu	Yoshiaki Kawajiri	November 15, 2024
9	"The Flower Way of Kabuki"; Transliteration: "Kabuki no Kadō" (Japanese: 歌舞伎の花道)	Nobu Ishida & Hwang Il-jin	Mitsutaka Hirota	Atsuko Ishizuka	November 22, 2024
10	"Golden Egg"	Kanji Wakabayashi & Hwang Young-sik	Tomomi Kawaguchi	Kanji Wakabayashi	November 29, 2024
11	"The Illusory Man"; Transliteration: "Maboroshi no Otoko" (Japanese: 幻の男)	Kentaro Hori & Hwang Il-jin	Mitsutaka Hirota	Yoshiaki Kawajiri	December 6, 2024
12	"Two Bad Guys"; Transliteration: "Waru ga Futari" (Japanese: ワルがふたり)	Noriaki Ishida	Ryunosuke Kingetsu	Yoshiaki Kawajiri	December 13, 2024
13	"The Decisive Battle!!"; Transliteration: "Kessen!!" (Japanese: 決戦！！)	Kanji Wakabayashi & Kim Min-sun	Tomomi Kawaguchi	Atsuko Ishizuka	December 20, 2024
14	"Haru vs. Gaku"; Transliteration: "Haru vs. Gaku" (Japanese: ハルVS.ガク)	Tatsunori Miyake & Hwang Young-sik	Ryunosuke Kingetsu	Akiko Nakano	January 10, 2025
15	"With You"	Kanji Wakabayashi & Hwang Il-jin	Mitsutaka Hirota	Kenichi Kawamura	January 17, 2025
16	"I Love Money"	Toru Ishida & Hwang Il-jin	Ryunosuke Kingetsu	Kenichi Kawamura	January 24, 2025
17	"Haru Unparalleled"; Transliteration: "Haru Musō" (Japanese: ハル無双)	Kanji Wakabayashi	Tomomi Kawaguchi	Yoshiaki Kawajiri	January 31, 2025
18	"The IT Cup"; Transliteration: "IT no Sakazuki" (Japanese: ITの盃)	Kentaro Hori & Kim Min-sun	Mitsutaka Hirota	Yoshiaki Kawajiri	February 7, 2025
19	"Look At the Sky Instead of the Peak"; Transliteration: "Itadaki Yori mo Sora o Mite" (Japanese: 頂よりも空を見て)	Noriaki Ishida & Hwang Young-sik	Ryunosuke Kingetsu	Yoshiaki Kawajiri	February 14, 2025
20	"The Price of Glory"; Transliteration: "Eikan no Taika" (Japanese: 栄冠の対価)	Tatsunori Miyake	Tomomi Kawaguchi	Atsuko Ishizuka	February 21, 2025
21	"The Dragon King's Palm"; Transliteration: "Ryūō no Tenohira" (Japanese: 龍王の掌)	Toru Ishida & Kim Min-sun	Ryunosuke Kingetsu	Yoshiaki Kawajiri	February 28, 2025
22	"All In"	Kanji Wakabayashi & Hwang Il-jin	Mitsutaka Hirota	Yoshiaki Kawajiri	March 7, 2025
23	"Media Wars"	Kentaro Hori & Hwang Il-jin	Tomomi Kawaguchi	Kentaro Hori	March 14, 2025
24	"I Love News"	Nobu Ishida	Ryunosuke Kingetsu	Yoshiaki Kawajiri	March 21, 2025
25	"The Collar of Money"; Transliteration: "Manē no Kubiwa" (Japanese: マネーの首輪)	Kanji Wakabayashi & Kim Min-sun	Mitsutaka Hirota	Yoshiaki Kawajiri	March 28, 2025 (Note: Episodes 25 and 26 aired back-to-back.)
26	"Game Changer"	Yuzo Sato, Hwang Il-jin & Kim Min-sun	Ryunosuke Kingetsu	Yuzo Sato	March 28, 2025

== Reception ==
By September 2023, the manga had over 1.5 million copies in circulation. Trillion Game was one of the fifty nominees for the Next Manga Award in 2021. It ranked eighth on Takarajimasha's Kono Manga ga Sugoi! 2022 list of best manga for male readers. It was nominated for the 15th Manga Taishō in 2022 and placed sixth with 55 points. Along with The Elusive Samurai, Frieren: Beyond Journey's End, and Sūji de Asobo, Trillion Game won the 69th Shogakukan Manga Award in 2024. (Note: Since 2023 the nominees are not divided into categories.)
