= Cocoro Toyoshima =

Japanese model and actress (born 2003)

- Born: September 25, 2003 (age 23); Gosen, Niigata, Japan
- Occupations: Actress; model
- Years active: 2018–present
- Agent: Irving
- Height: 167 cm (5 ft 6 in)

Japanese name
- Kanji: 豊島 心桜
- Hiragana: とよしま こころ
Transcriptions
- Romanization: Toyoshima Cocoro
- Website: toyoshimacocoro.com

Cocoro Toyoshima (豊島 心桜, Toyoshima Cocoro; born September 25, 2003) is a Japanese model and actress.

== Biography ==
Toyoshima was born on September 25, 2003, in Gosen City, Niigata Prefecture. She trained in classical ballet from kindergarten onward and continued for ten years. However, in 2019, she revealed that her body had grown stiff over time; she could still do the splits, but only after completing a proper warm-up first.

== Filmography ==
=== Film ===
| Year | Title | Role | Notes | Ref. |
|---|---|---|---|---|
| 2022 | Mysterious Taxi: Be Careful of the Windy Night Road! | Sachiko Katajima | | |
| 2023 | Esper X Detective Agency: The Search for Goodbye | Megumi Masuda | | |
| 2026 | Zakken!: The Cosmos Beneath Our Feet | Madoka Omori | | |

=== Television ===
| Year | Title | Role | Notes | Ref. |
|---|---|---|---|---|
| 2020 | Marry Me! | Momoka Hayashi | | |
| 2020 | Siren's Confession | Suzuna Orikawa | | |
| 2022 | Cooking Way | Hikaru Shimomura | | |
| 2023 | Gekikarado 2 | Ayana Kamijo | Season 2; episode 5 | |
| 2024 | From the Dust | Miyako Senda | | |
| 2024 | The Woman of Science Research Institute | Haruna Shimaki | Season 24; episode 1 | |
| 2024 | My Dress-Up Darling | Shinju Inui | | |
| 2025 | Salaryman Shigeru Yamazaki | | Short web drama | |
| 2026 | The Mole | Mirai Tsukahara | Short web drama | |

== Publications ==
=== Photobook ===
- "Only Cherry Blossoms" (November 6, 2023, Shueisha, Weekly Playboy Photo Book)

Digital Photobook

| Year | Title | Publisher | Ref. |
|---|---|---|---|
| 2023 | "Major feeling" | Shueisha | |
| 2024 | "Mind and Body" | Shueisha | |
| 2024 | "The Final Boss of 2023 will also Descend in 2024: Prologue" | Shueisha | |
| 2024 | "Admiration" | Shueisha | |
| 2024 | "World-ranked Gorgeous Body" | Shueisha | |
| 2024 | "Just like that." | Shueisha | |
| 2025 | "Hana, Man, Kan, Shin" | Shueisha | |
