= My Dress-Up Darling =

Japanese manga series and its franchise

- First tankōbon volume cover, featuring Marin Kitagawa

その着せ替え人形(ビスク・ドール)は恋をする (Sono Bisuku Dōru wa Koi o Suru)
- Genre: Romantic comedy; Slice of life
- Manga
- Written by: Shinichi Fukuda
- Published by: Square Enix
- English publisher: NA: Square Enix
- Imprint: Young Gangan Comics
- Magazine: Young Gangan
- Original run: January 19, 2018 – March 21, 2025
- Volumes: 15
- Television drama
- Directed by: Koji Shintoku; Shō Ōsaki; Go Sasaki; Toshiyuki Homma
- Produced by: Saori Takao
- Written by: Satoko Okazaki
- Music by: Misaki Umase
- Studio: Kyodo TV
- Original network: MBS, TBS
- Original run: October 9, 2024 – December 11, 2024
- Episodes: 10
- Manga

My Dress-Up Darling XOXO!
- Written by: Choboraunyopomi
- Published by: Square Enix
- English publisher: NA: Square Enix
- Imprint: Young Gangan Comics
- Magazine: Young Gangan
- Original run: December 20, 2024 – July 4, 2025
- Volumes: 1
- Anime television series
- My Dress-Up Darling (2022–2025)
- icon

My Dress-Up Darling (Japanese: その着せ替え人形(ビスク・ドール)は恋をする, Hepburn: Sono Bisuku Dōru wa Koi o Suru; transl. "The Bisque Doll Falls in Love") (Note: The kanji 着せ替え人形 in the Japanese title, glossed with furigana as Bisuku Dōru (ビスク・ドール), are normally read as Kisekae Ningyō ("dress-up doll").) is a Japanese manga series written and illustrated by Shinichi Fukuda. It was serialized in Square Enix's seinen manga magazine Young Gangan from January 2018 to March 2025, and compiled in 15 volumes. An anime television series adaptation produced by CloverWorks aired its first season from January to March 2022. A live-action television drama adaptation aired on MBS's Dramaism programming block from October to December 2024. A second season of the anime adaptation aired from July to September 2025.

By October 2025, the manga had more than 15 million copies in circulation, and has been generally well received by critics.

== Premise ==
Wakana Gojo's passion for crafting hina dolls causes him to hide his interests due to social trauma. However, when his beautiful and popular classmate Marin Kitagawa discovers his talent, she sees beyond his apparent idiosyncrasies and encourages him to create cosplay costumes. With Marin's support, Wakana steps out of his seclusion and begins to gain confidence. Working together, they create unique and beautiful costumes showcasing their talents and true selves.

== Characters ==
Wakana Gojo (五条 新菜, Gojō Wakana)
Voiced by: Shōya Ishige, Tomoyo Takayanagi (young) (Japanese); Paul Dateh, Jack Britton (young) (English)
Portrayed by: Kōta Nomura
A first-year high school student. Being an orphan, he was raised by his grandfather, a craftsman of hina dolls, who also inspired him to become a kashira-shi (頭師), a craftsman who makes the heads of hina dolls. Wakana has a large physique and is over 180 cm tall, but he has low self-esteem and is reclusive due to a bitter memory of being criticized by his female childhood friend, who thought that boys should not be playing with dolls, ending their friendship. As a result, he hid his doll-making hobby and had no friends until he met Marin. Thanks to Marin's encouragement and support, Wakana steps out of his comfort zone and embraces his love for crafting. He grows more confident with each project, and through their collaboration, Wakana finds a sense of belonging in the cosplay community that he had never experienced before. Wakana grows closer to Marin, he seems to be completely unaware to her falling in love with him, until he finally confesses to her and the feelings are mutual. At the end of the series, he is a successful doll maker and he has married Marin. They also had a daughter named Nichika.
Marin Kitagawa (喜多川 海夢, Kitagawa Marin)
Voiced by: Hina Suguta (Japanese); AmaLee (English)
Portrayed by: Riko Nagase
A first-year student in Wakana's high school class. An archetype of a gyaru, notable for her warmth, friendliness, positivity, and outgoing nature. Marin is shown to dislike overly critical people who judge others based on their interests. She is a huge fan of anime, and her entire bedroom is decorated with anime posters and merchandise. After a series of successful cosplays, Marin grows closer to Wakana and eventually realizes she is head-over-heels in love with him. She continually does whatever she can to invite him to different places and spend time with him, as a way to win his heart and make him her boyfriend, although Wakana seems to be completely oblivious to her feelings for him until his confession and they get together. She lives alone as her mother died when she was a child, and her father is often away due to work. At the end of the series she is married to Wakana and works as a model. They also had a daughter named Nichika.
Kaoru Gojo (五条 薫, Gojō Kaoru)
Voiced by: Atsushi Ono (Japanese); R. Bruce Elliott (English)
Portrayed by: Meikyō Yamada
Kaoru is Wakana's caring grandfather and a hina doll artist, who raised Wakana after the death of his parents. Later on, he became a mentor to his grandson, showing him the ropes of how they're designed and put together.
Nowa Sugaya (菅谷 乃羽, Sugaya Nowa)
Voiced by: Larissa Tago Takeda (Japanese); Dani Chambers (English)
Portrayed by: Nanaka Yano
Nowa is Marin's flamboyant best friend and a classmate of both Marin and Wakana.
Sajuna Inui (乾 紗寿叶, Inui Sajuna)
Voiced by: Atsumi Tanezaki (Japanese); Risa Mei (English)
Portrayed by: Akana Ikeda
A cosplayer who presents herself under the nickname of "Juju" (ジュジュ). She is a second-year student at an all-girls private high school. However, despite being a year older than Wakana and Marin, Sajuna's youthful appearance and petite figure means she is often mistaken for a middle school student. She is outspoken, blunt, and headstrong, going to great lengths to achieve her goals. Sajuna cherishes her younger sister Shinju and does all she can to make her happy. Like Marin, she is a fan of cosplay, and she specializes in cosplaying as magical girl characters as a way to fulfill her childhood dream of becoming one. Despite being a popular cosplayer, she does not upload her pictures herself, instead leaving it to Shinju.
Shinju Inui (乾 心寿, Inui Shinju)
Voiced by: Hina Yōmiya (Japanese); Jad Saxton (English)
Portrayed by: Kokoro Toyoshima
Sajuna's younger sister. Shinju is a middle school student. She is 178 cm tall and is sometimes mistaken for an adult. However, despite her imposing physique, she is incredibly timid. Shinju is close to her sister and holds her in very high regard. When Sajuna cosplays, Shinju assumes the role of photographer, using a DSLR camera borrowed from their father. She is also skilled at using a computer, processing and uploading the images she takes. While Shinju secretly wishes to cosplay herself, she fears falling short of her sister's high standards. Nevertheless, she starts to cosplay after encouragement from the others.
Suzuka Itou (伊藤 涼香, Itō Suzuka)
Voiced by: Marie Miyake (Japanese); Celeste Perez (English)
Suzuka is a photographer who often attends cosplay events and befriends Marin and Wakana. She gets overly excited by a variety of cosplay. She gets especially excited by cross-playing.
Chitose Amano (天野 千歳, Amano Chitose) / Amane Himeno (姫野 あまね, Himeno Amane)
Voiced by: Ayumu Murase (Japanese); Drew Breedlove (English)
Portrayed by: Daichi Shiozaki
A university student who is also a crossdress cosplayer under name Amane Himeno.
Akira Ogata (緒方 旭, Ogata Akira)
Voiced by: Maki Kawase (Japanese); Hannah Alyea (English)
Akira is a reclusive female cosplayer and prop designer, who inspires Wakana with her art. Initially appearing to hate Marin, she is actually a secret super-fan of her cosplays.
Miyako Honda (本多 都, Honda Miyako)
Voiced by: Mayuko Kazama (Japanese); Sarah Roach (English)
Miyako is a female cosplayer and close friend of the photographer Suzuka.
Nobara Aoyagi (青柳 のばら, Aoyagi Nobara)
Voiced by: Mai Kanno (Japanese); Lila Britton (English)
Nobara is Wakana's childhood friend who gave him the trauma about making hina dolls by yelling at him when they were children. As a teenager, she deeply regrets her actions and seems to apologize to Wakana.

== Themes ==
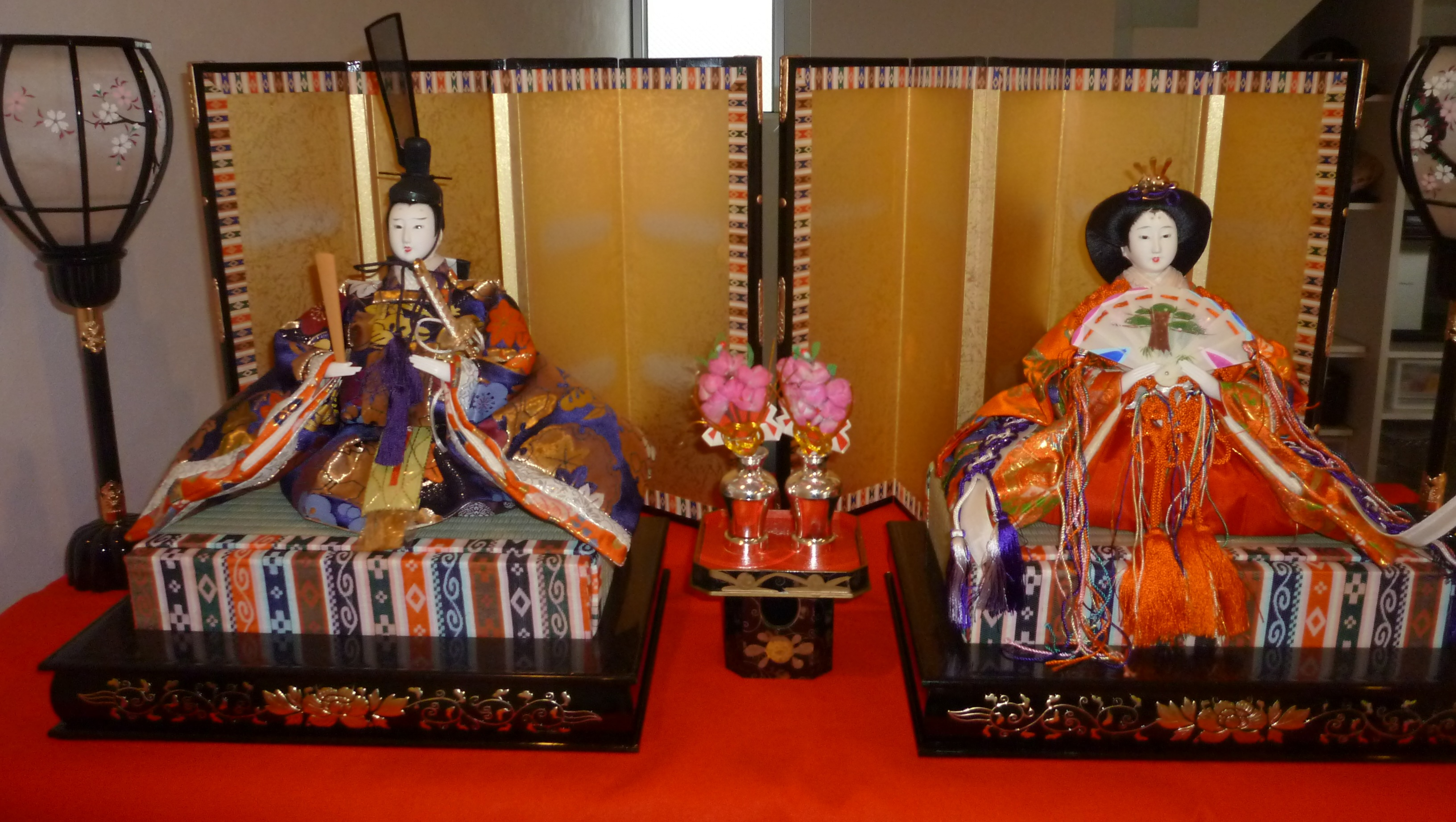
A set of Hina dolls

This work describes the development and love of boys and girls, with cosplay as its central theme. Although it also includes some erotic scenes, the work is notable for its detailed portrayal of character psychology and the process of creating cosplay costumes. It showcases the creation of the Hina doll, makeup, and camera work, and the author personally visited the Iwatsuki doll-making workshops in Saitama City, known as the "Doll City," to gain insights into the real lives of doll makers and cosplayers.

== Production ==
Shinichi Fukuda set Wakana as an orphan without friends in order to create a situation where he has to solve problems with Marin, instead of his parents or other friends.

== Media ==
=== Manga ===
Written and illustrated by Shinichi Fukuda, the series was serialized in the seinen manga magazine Young Gangan from January 19, 2018, to March 21, 2025. The individual chapters were collected by Square Enix in 15 tankōbon volumes. An official fan book was released on September 24, 2022.

During the Anime Expo in July 2019, Square Enix announced the English version of the series under the title My Dress-Up Darling and published it under its new publication imprint Square Enix Manga & Books.

A spin-off manga written and illustrated by Choboraunyopomi, titled My Dress-Up Darling XOXO! (着せ替え人形(ビスク・ドール)でchu♡, Bisuku Dōru de Chu), was serialized in the same magazine from December 20, 2024, to July 4, 2025. Its chapters were collected in one tankōbon volume, released on July 25, 2025. In November 2025, Square Enix started publishing the spin-off in English on its Manga Up! Global platform. In February 2026, Square Enix Manga & Books announced that they had licensed the spin-off for English publication, with the single volume released in October later in the year.

==== Volumes ====
No.	Original release date	Original ISBN	English release date	English ISBN
1	November 24, 2018	978-4-7575-5920-2	April 14, 2020	978-1-64609-032-7
Chapters 1–7; Bonus (おまけ, Omake)
Traumatized by a childhood incident with a friend who took exception to his love of traditional dolls, doll-artisan hopeful Wakana Gojou passes his days as a loner, finding solace in the home ec room at his high school. To Wakana, people like beautiful Marin Kitagawa, a trendy girl who's always surrounded by a throng of friends, is practically an alien from another world. But when cheerful Marin--never one to be shy--spots Wakana sewing away one day after school, she barges in with the aim of roping her quiet classmate into her secret hobby: cosplay! Will Wakana's wounded heart be able to handle the invasion from this sexy alien?!
2	November 24, 2018	978-4-7575-5921-9	August 25, 2020 (digital); September 1, 2020 (physical)	978-1-64609-033-4
Chapters 8–15; Bonus (おまけ, Omake)
Though training to become an artisan who makes hina doll heads, Wakana Gojo is instead making cosplay costumes for Marin Kitagawa, one of the most popular girls in class. As if this turn of events wasn't shocking enough, Wakana discovers that his first cosplay creation is due in...two weeks?! But with a reward like Marin's smile hopefully waiting at the end of it all, Wakana dives right in. Will the results of two short weeks of hard work be enough to satisfy Marin's high expectations?!
3	May 25, 2019	978-4-7575-6138-0	December 29, 2020	978-1-64609-034-1
Chapters 16–23; Bonus (おまけ, Omake)
Wakana and Marin make it through their very first cosplay event, and not long after, Marin's heart undergoes a change...?! But that's not going to stop her cosplaying! To research their next project, the duo decide to watch the anime it's based on...but on screening night, they wind up alone together...?! And with JuJu, another gorgeous cosplayer, dropping by Wakana's house...it seems like a love triangle is abrew!
4	October 25, 2019	978-4-7575-6355-1	June 8, 2021	978-1-64609-051-8
Chapters 24–31; Bonus (おまけ, Omake)
The preparations for Marin and JuJu's group cosplay steadily advance...until at long last, the costumes are complete!! That should just leave the photo shoot...but Wakana has a secret plan the other two don't know about!!
5	May 25, 2020	978-4-7575-6657-6; 978-4-7575-6658-3 (SE)	May 10, 2022	978-1-64609-113-3
Chapters 32–39; Bonus (おまけ, Omake)
Wakana has spent every summer vacation on his own...until now! With a friend like Marin at his side, he's about to get a taste of everything summer has to offer and more—the pool, fireworks, extra homework…and of course, cosplay! Now that she's crossed off bronzed fighter Veronica-tya from her to-do list, Marin has set her sights on a succubus from one of her favorite manga series! But when she picks out a questionable location for the photo shoot, Wakana's the one about to be left red in the face and hot under the collar!
6	November 25, 2020	978-4-7575-6959-1	August 16, 2022	978-1-64609-128-7
Chapters 40–47; Bonus (おまけ, Omake)
Ever since he got roped into helping Marin, Wakana has had his world and perceptions expanded by cosplay. In fact, it's even helped him find peace with himself! And that seems to be one of cosplay's superpowers, as Wakana and Marin discover at an Ikebukuro event. There, they meet crossplayer Amane and hear their cosplay origin story, which gives Marin the push she needs to decide on her next costume! Unfortunately for Wakana, getting the new outfit ready is going to be anything but easy...
7	April 24, 2021	978-4-7575-7212-6; 978-4-7575-7213-3 (SE)	January 31, 2023	978-1-64609-164-5
Chapters 48–55; Bonus (おまけ, Omake)
Marin's bestie and Wakana's classmate Nowa might seem a little flaky, but the girl has some serious instinct when love is in the air! When she tosses out a bombshell at karaoke by flatly asking Marin and Wakana if they're an item, it sends the two running! But before long, it's cosplay over love, as the school culture festival rolls around! To Marin's utter surprise and delight, their school features a unique festival event that means...cosplay at school?! And even though Marin's an old hand at cosplay now, the type of costume the event calls for is all new to her!
8	October 25, 2021	978-4-7575-7344-4; 978-4-7575-7345-1 (SE)	April 11, 2023	978-1-64609-165-2
Chapters 56–63; Bonus (おまけ, Omake)
At their high school's cultural festival, Marin tackles her first crossplay! While struggling with projecting masculinity in character, she prepares for the festival with the rest of the class. But while Marin is a pro at group activities, Wakana has jitters about his very first time working together with his classmates. Is there a light at the end of his tunnel of nerves and anxiety?!
9	March 25, 2022	978-4-7575-7837-1	July 18, 2023	978-1-64609-195-9
Chapters 64–71; Bonus (おまけ, Omake)
To get the swanky DSLR camera of her dreams, Marin picks up more part-time work! And once she's scraped up the cash to buy her shiny new gadget, she attends a cosplay event...this time, as a photographer! Meanwhile, at the same event, Wakana expands his horizons by meeting up with an online acquaintance he idolizes! Will Wakana get more than he bargained for when he gets a closer look into the complex world of "afters" and sewing culture?!
10	September 24, 2022	978-4-7575-8101-2; 978-4-7575-8102-9 (SE)	October 31, 2023	978-1-64609-228-4
Chapters 72–79; Bonus (おまけ, Omake)
Upon meeting up with Amane-san and his friends at a cosplay event, Marin and Wakana learn about a group cosplay shoot they're putting together for Coffin, a horror game. Unfortunately, the older cosplayers have life commitments that get in the way of hitting the studio for their appointment! Cue Marin and her ever proactive mind! She rings up a certain someone to see if they'd be game for an impromptu cosplay collaboration, but it's going to be a hard sell! When more bodies are needed, will Wakana have to pitch in to make up the numbers?!
11	March 25, 2023	978-4-7575-8425-9; 978-4-7575-8426-6 (SE)	April 16, 2024	978-1-64609-247-5
Chapters 80–87; Bonus (おまけ, Omake)
At the Coffin group cosplay, a big surprise awaits JuJu-sama!! While wearing a costume she never thought she'd wear, she reveals to the others her shocking plans for her cosplay career! What will the older cosplayers have to say when they hear her out, never mind Marin and Shinju?! Later, Marin puts an uncomfortable question to the gang about Akira, and eventually the truth comes out about why she seems to be avoiding Marin! And before everyone knows it, Winter Comiket is right around the corner!
12	September 25, 2023	978-4-7575-8748-9; 978-4-7575-8749-6 (SE)	October 22, 2024	978-1-64609-303-8
Chapters 88–95; Bonus (おまけ, Omake)
Although the impromptu horror-game group cosplay came with a whole bunch of twists, from JuJu's surprise costume to Akira's rowdy outburst, one big revelation failed to make the highlight reel: Marin never told Wakana how she feels about him! Now with Winter Comiket and a complicated new cosplay on the horizon, the right moment seems even more elusive! But as Christmas cheer fills the air, could there be a more perfect time for a heartfelt confession of love?!
13	May 24, 2024	978-4-7575-9132-5; 978-4-7575-9133-2 (SE)	April 15, 2025	978-1-64609-365-6
Chapters 96–102; Bonus (おまけ, Omake)
After several sleepless nights, Wakana has finished the Heaven's Will costume just in time for Comiket! Even though he and Marin aren't sure what to expect from the event, once she bursts onto the scene as the eerie angel Haniel, they draw a massive crowd with the help of some familiar faces! The immaculate combination of his craftsmanship and her acting chops soon whips the entire venue into a fervor—so why does Wakana look down in the dumps?!
14	November 25, 2024	978-4-7575-9492-0; 978-4-7575-9493-7 (SE)	October 21, 2025	978-1-64609-432-5
Chapters 103–109; Bonus (おまけ, Omake)
Photos of Marin's Haniel cosplay have spread like wildfire on social media, earning high praise from none other than the creator of Heaven's Will himself! Yet, the fear that all this attention will forever alter the course of their relationship causes negative emotions to bubble up within Marin and Wakana. Try as they might to hide their insecurities, the dams finally burst when a blast from the past makes her shocking return to Gojo Dolls!
15	July 25, 2025	978-4-7575-9972-7	April 21, 2026	978-1-64609-499-8
Chapters 110–115; Side Story (番外編, Bangai-hen); Epilogue (エピローグ, Epirōgu); Stargazer (スターゲイザー, Sutāgeizā); Bonus (おまけ, Omake)
SP	July 25, 2025	978-4-7575-9973-4	October 13, 2026	979-8-89910-045-1
Chapters 1–13; Special Chapters (特別描き下ろし, Tokubetsu Kakioroshi)

=== Anime ===
An anime television series adaptation was announced in the ninth issue of Young Gangan, which was published in April 2021. It was produced by CloverWorks and directed by Keisuke Shinohara, with Yoriko Tomita handling the series' scripts, and Kazumasa Ishida designing the characters and serving as a chief animation director. Takeshi Nakatsuka composes the series' music. The first season aired from January 9 to March 27, 2022, on Tokyo MX and other networks. (Note: Tokyo MX listed the series premiere as airing on January 8 at 24:00, which is effectively January 9 at midnight JST.)

A sequel was announced in September 2022. It was later revealed to be a second season, with the main staff and cast members reprising their roles. It aired from July 6 to September 21, 2025, on Tokyo MX and other networks. (Note: Tokyo MX listed the season premiere as airing on July 5 at 24:00, which is effectively July 6 at midnight JST.)

=== Live-action drama ===
A live-action television drama adaptation was announced on August 30, 2024. The drama is produced by Kyodo Television and directed by Koji Shintoku, with Satoko Okazaki writing the scripts. Misaki Umase composed the series' music. It aired on MBS's Dramaism programming block from October 9 to December 11, 2024. (Note: MBS listed the series premiere as airing on October 8 at 24:59, which is effectively October 9 at 12:59 a.m. JST.) The opening theme song is "Princess Hero" (プリンセスヒーロー), performed by Chō Tokimeki Sendenbu, and the ending theme song is "Lovely Baby" (ラブリーベイビー), performed by Pedro.

==== Episodes ====
No.	Title (Note: The live-action drama series was not officially released outside Japan, thus the English translated titles are unofficial.)	Directed by	Original release date
1	"Two Complete Opposites"; Transliteration: "Magyaku no Futari" (Japanese: 真逆の2人)	Koji Shintoku	October 9, 2024
2	"First Friend"; Transliteration: "Hajimete no Tomodachi" (Japanese: 初めての友達)	Koji Shintoku	October 16, 2024
3	"Am I Becoming Shizuku-tan...?"; Transliteration: "Watashi, Shizuku-tan ni Nareteru...?" (Japanese: 私、雫たんになれてる...?)	Koji Shintoku	October 23, 2024
4	"A Request from Juju"; Transliteration: "Juju-sama kara no Irai" (Japanese: ジュジュ様からの依頼)	Shō Ōsaki	October 30, 2024
5	"Being Honest About What You Like"; Transliteration: ""Suki" ni Shōjiki ni Naru" (Japanese: 「好き」に正直になる)	Shō Ōsaki	November 6, 2024
6	"Unexpressed Love"; Transliteration: "Tsutawaranai Koigokoro" (Japanese: 伝わらない恋心)	Go Sasaki	November 13, 2024
7	"To Be Able to Love Myself"; Transliteration: "Jibun o Suki ni Nareru Koto" (Japanese: 自分を好きになれること)	Toshiyuki Honma	November 20, 2024
8	"I Won't Lie About "Love" Anymore"; Transliteration: "Mō "Suki" ni Uso wa Tsukanai" (Japanese: もう「好き」に嘘はつかない)	Koji Shintoku	November 27, 2024
9	"The Cultural Festival Finally Begins"; Transliteration: "Tsuini Hajimaru Bunkasai" (Japanese: ついに始まる文化祭)	Koji Shintoku	December 4, 2024
10	"The Most Beautiful Person in the World"; Transliteration: "Sekai de Ichiban Kirei na Hito" (Japanese: 世界で一番奇麗な人)	Koji Shintoku	December 11, 2024

== Reception ==
=== Sales ===
In February 2022, it was reported that the manga had an additional 1.5 million copies in circulation following the premiere of the anime adaptation. In June 2022, it was announced the manga had over 7 million copies in circulation. In September 2023, it was announced the manga had 9.5 million copies in circulation. In October 2023, the manga had surpassed 10 million copies in circulation. In May 2024, the manga had surpassed 11 million copies in circulation. By September 2024, the manga had surpassed 12 million copies in circulation. In October 2025, the manga had surpassed 15 million copies in circulation.

=== Accolades ===
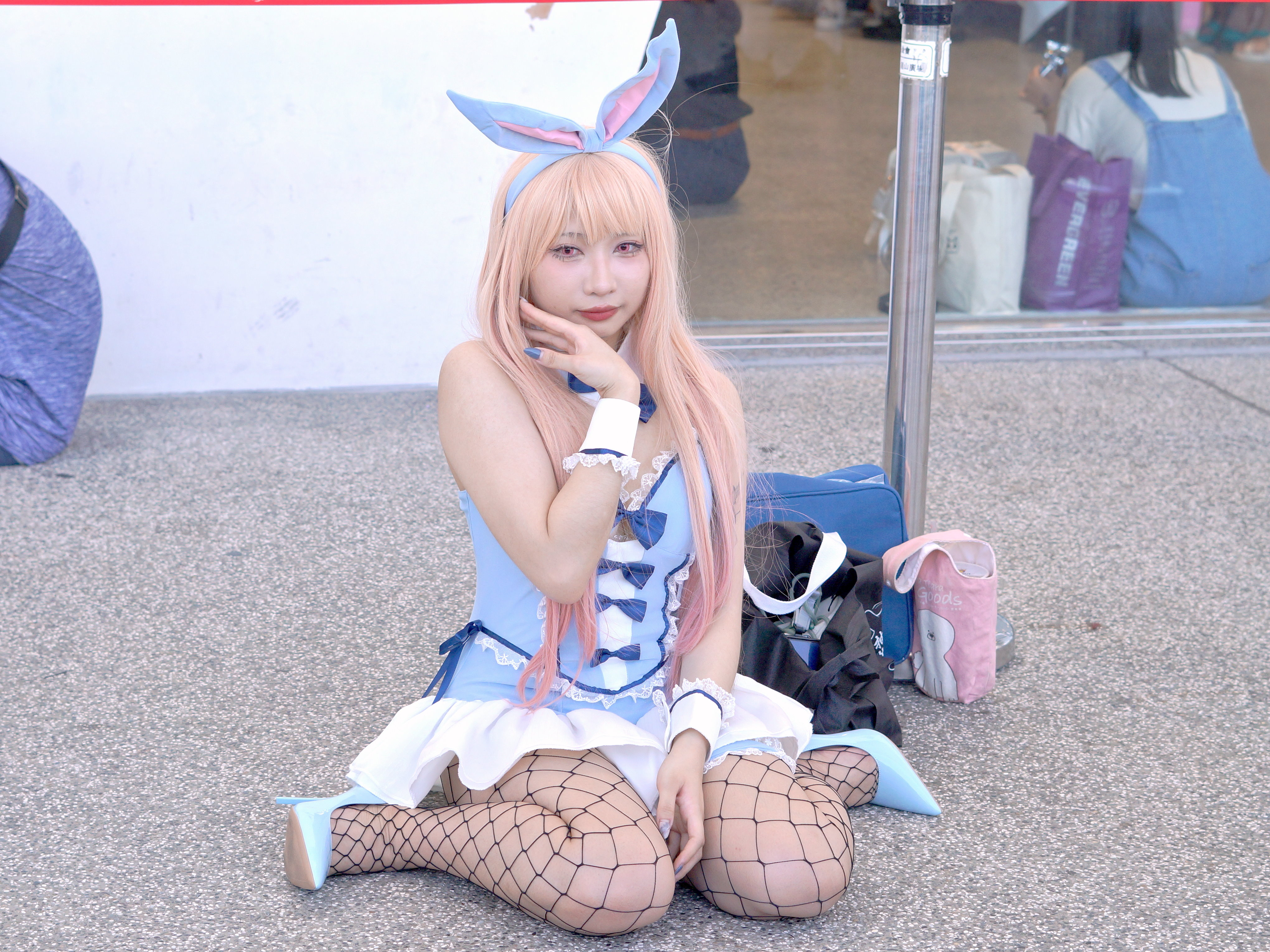
Cosplay of Marin Kitagawa by Jr YU

In August 2019, the series was ranked sixth in the print manga category according to the votes for the fourth edition of the Next Manga Award, organized by Da Vinci magazine from Media Factory and the Niconico website.

The manga was ranked sixteenth for readers in the 2020 edition of the Kono Manga ga Sugoi! guide from Takarajimasha.

The manga was ranked third in Honya Club's Nationwide Bookstore Employees' Recommended Comics of 2020, a survey that collected results from 1,100 professional bookstore employees in Japan.

The series, alongside Artiste, won the Men's Comic Prize at NTT Solmare's "Minna ga Erabu!! Denshi Comic Taishō 2020" in 2020.
