= Shōya Ishige =

Japanese voice actor

- 石毛翔弥
- Born: August 20, 1990 (age 36); Saitama Prefecture, Japan
- Occupations: Actor; voice actor
- Years active: 2009–present
- Agents: Stardust Promotion (2016–2019); Intention (2019–present)
- Notable work: Yu-Gi-Oh! VRAINS as Yusaku Fujiki/Playmaker; Godzilla Singular Point as Yun Arikawa; My Dress-Up Darling as Wakana Gojo; The Fire Hunter as Koushi
- Height: 177 cm (5 ft 10 in)

Shōya Ishige (Japanese: 石毛翔弥, Hepburn: Ishige Shōya; born August 20, 1990) is a Japanese actor who specializes in voice acting. After working as a stage performer, Ishige wanted to do voice acting in anime, which he did with his first role as additional voices in Orange and later his first major role as Yusaku Fujiki in Yu-Gi-Oh! VRAINS. Some of his other noteworthy roles include Yun Arikawa in Godzilla Singular Point and Wakana Gojo in My Dress-Up Darling.

== Biography ==
Ishige was born in Saitama Prefecture on August 20, 1990. In high school, he was a fan of musicals; he later became a fan of Psycho-Pass. After graduating from high school, he joined the Shiki Theatre Company to pursue a career in acting. However, Ishige wanted to do voice acting in anime. In order to pursue this, he left the company and joined Stardust Promotion, where he was cast in his first role as additional voices in Orange and his first major role as Yusaku Fujiki in Yu-Gi-Oh! VRAINS.

In 2019, Ishige left Stardust Promotion and joined Intention.

== Filmography ==
=== TV series ===
2016

- Orange as additional voices

2017

- Seiren as additional voices
- Yu-Gi-Oh! VRAINS as Yusaku Fujiki/Playmaker

2019

- Granblue Fantasy The Animation as Skull Knight

2020

- Moriarty the Patriot as Noahtic Audience

2021

- Don't Toy with Me, Miss Nagatoro as Gamer Boys
- So I'm a Spider, So What? as Ren Aikawa
- Godzilla Singular Point as Yun Arikawa
- Scarlet Nexus as Other Suppression Force

2022

- My Dress-Up Darling as Wakana Gojo
- Lucifer and the Biscuit Hammer as Ludo Shubarie
- The Devil Is a Part-Timer!! as Kazuma Sasaki

2023

- Ayakashi Triangle as Soga Ninokuru
- The Fire Hunter as Koushi
- The Fruit of Evolution 2 as Theobold Terra Kaiser

2024

- Black Butler: Public School Arc as Clayton
- Kinnikuman: Perfect Origin Arc as Peek a Boo
- Goodbye, Dragon Life as Geo
- Trillion Game as Manabu "Gaku" Taira

2025

- I'm Living with an Otaku NEET Kunoichi!? as Tsukasa Atsumi
- Orb: On the Movements of the Earth as Albert Brudzewski
- Classic Stars as Liszt
- May I Ask for One Final Thing? as Leonardo El Vandimion
- Wind Breaker Season 2 as Renji Kaga

2026

- The Classroom of a Black Cat and a Witch as Tarf Cancer
- Even Though I'm a Super Timid Noble Girl, I Accepted the Bet from My Cunning Fiancé as Mike

2027

- Wound & Bandage as Ginsuke Hatobane

=== Original net animation ===
2024

- Gundam: Requiem for Vengeance as Kneeland Lesean

=== Video games ===
2021

- Lost Judgment as Shion Takamori

2025

- Granblue Fantasy as Jherion Stroud
- Final Fantasy XIV: Dawntrail as Alxaal

=== Dubbing ===
==== Live-action ====
- All of Us Are Dead as Jung Min-jae (Jin Ho-eun)
- The Fast and the Furious (2024 The Cinema edition) as Jesse (Chad Lindberg)
- West Side Story as Baby John (Patrick Higgins)
- Willow as Prince Airk (Dempsey Bryk)

==== Animation ====
- Goat as Will Harris
