= Spira Spica =

Japanese band

Spira Spica スピラ・スピカ
- Origin: Nara Prefecture, Japan
- Genres: J-Pop, Rock, Anison
- Years active: 2013–present
- Label: Sacra Music (2018–present)
- Members: Mikiha (vocals); Yūji Teraniji (guitar); Masuda (bass)
- Website: spiraspica.com

Spira Spica (スピラ・スピカ, Supira Supika) is a Japanese pop rock band from Nara Prefecture which is affiliated with Sacra Music. The band began activities under the name Snowman in 2013, and would perform at various music venues throughout Japan and release several independent singles and albums. They changed to their current name in 2018, and later that year made their major debut under Sacra Music with the release of the single "Start Dash", the title song of which was used as the second ending theme to the anime television series Gundam Build Divers.

== History ==
The band began activities in 2013 under the name Snowman (スノーマン). Originally consisting of childhood friends Yūji Teraniji and Masuda, they were later joined by vocalist Mikiha, who had first heard of Snowman after they announced that they were looking for a female vocalist. At the time, she had been studying at Osaka University. In March 2015, the band released their first single "Good For Nothing", followed by their first mini-album Snow Wonderland, which was sold as a limited edition in Tower Records stores. They also began participating in several competitions throughout the country.

Between 2016 and 2018, the band released several more CDs, including the split CD "Refrain" and the album Norikoeru (乗り越える), the latter of which was released in two volumes. During a live concert titled "Yuki Fes" in January 2018, the band announced that they would be changing their name to Spira Spica; the name was derived from the Latin phrase meaning "having hopes as long as one lives" and the star Spica. This was followed by the album Yuki to Hoshi to Bokura (雪と星と僕ら), their first wide release, as well as the announcement that they would be making their major debut under the Sacra Music label. On August 8, 2018, they released their first major single "Start Dash" (スタートダッシュ); the title song was used as the second ending theme for the anime television series Gundam Build Divers.

Spira Spica released their second single "Chiisana Yuuki" (小さな勇気, Chīsana yūki) on March 6, 2019. Their next single, "Koi wa Miracle" (恋はミラクル, Koi wa Mirakuru), was released on May 29, 2019; the title song is used as the ending theme for the anime series Ao-chan Can't Study!. Their fourth single, "Iyayo Iyayo mo Suki no Uchi" (イヤヨイヤヨモスキノウチ), was released on August 28, 2019; the title song is used as the opening theme for the anime series Do You Love Your Mom and Her Two-Hit Multi-Target Attacks?. Their fifth single, an extended play titled "Re:RISE", was released on October 23, 2019; the title song is used as the opening theme for the original net animation Gundam Build Divers Re:Rise. Their sixth single, "Sansan Days" (燦々デイズ, Sansan Deizu), was released on February 2, 2022; the title song is used as the opening theme for the anime series My Dress-Up Darling. They released the album Nagareboshi Train (ナガレボシトレイン) on March 16, 2022.

== Members ==
- Mikiha (幹葉) – Vocals
- Yūji Teraniji (寺西 裕二, Teraniji Yūji) – Guitar
- Masuda (ますだ) – Bass

== Discography ==
=== Singles ===
Title	Peak Oricon chart position
Start Dash (スタートダッシュ): Release date: August 8, 2018	67
Chiisana Yuuki (小さな勇気, Chīsana yūki): Release date: March 6, 2019	90
Koi wa Miracle (恋はミラクル, Koi wa Mirakuru): Release date: May 29, 2019	43
Iyayo Iyayo mo Suki no Uchi (イヤヨイヤヨモスキノウチ): Release date: August 28, 2019	43
Re:RISE: Release date: October 23, 2019	43
Sansan Days (燦々デイズ, Sansan Deizu): Release date: February 2, 2022	18
