= Hina Suguta =

Japanese voice actress

- 直田 姫奈
- Born: April 17, 1995 (age 31); Hyōgo Prefecture, Japan
- Occupations: Voice actress; singer
- Years active: 2018–present
- Agents: Animo Produce (2018–2023); Tokyo Actor's Consumer's Cooperative Society (2023–present)
- Notable credits: BanG Dream! as Tōko Kirigaya; My Dress-Up Darling as Marin Kitagawa; Honkai: Star Rail as Guinaifen
- Musical career
- Genre: J-pop
- Instrument: Guitar
- Years active: 2024–present
- Label: Nippon Columbia
- Website: columbia.jp/sugutahina/

Hina Suguta (直田 姫奈, Suguta Hina; born April 17, 1995) is a Japanese voice actress and singer who is affiliated with the Tokyo Actor's Consumer's Cooperative Society. She is known for voicing Marin Kitagawa in My Dress-Up Darling. She is also a member of the band Morfonica, a part of the multimedia franchise BanG Dream!; she voices Tōko Kirigaya in the same franchise.

== Biography ==
Suguta was born in Hyōgo Prefecture on April 17, 1995. From an early age she had an interest in entertainment, having been a fan of the idol group Morning Musume and the singer Yui, the latter inspiring her to learn to play the acoustic guitar. During her junior high school and high school years, she became a fan of anime series such as Gintama, One Piece, and Free!. She also lived in Hong Kong and Singapore at her youth, and learned English before returning to Japan.

After graduating from university, Suguta initially worked as a nursery school teacher. At the time, she was friends with Chiharu Hokaze, who had gone to the same university as her and at the time was a member of the idol group 22/7. Although Suguta had considered becoming a voice actress while in college, her friendship with Hokaze further inspired her to pursue that path.

Suguta began training at a voice acting training school run by the talent agency Amino Produce in 2017. Her first voice acting role was as the character Haruka in the mobile game Afterlost; she also became a member of the game's in-universe idol group SPR5.

Suguta became a member of the band Morfonica in 2020, serving as its guitarist; the band is a part of the multimedia franchise BanG Dream!. She was also cast as Tōko Kirigaya in the same series. In 2022, she played Marin Kitagawa in the anime television series My Dress-Up Darling. In 2023, she was a recipient of the Best New Actor Award at the 17th Seiyu Awards.

Suguta debuted as a soloist under Nippon Columbia with her debut digital single "Lavender Blue", releasing under her 29th birthday, April 17, 2024.

== Filmography ==
=== Anime series ===
Year	Title	Role	Ref.
2019	Rinshi!! Ekoda-chan	Tanaka-san	
2019	Afterlost	Haruka	
2020	BanG Dream! Girls Band Party! Pico: Ohmori	Tōko Kirigaya	
2020	Eternity: Shinya no Nurekoi Channel	Maki Kusunoki	
2021	BanG Dream! Girls Band Party! Pico Fever!	Tōko Kirigaya	
2022	My Dress-Up Darling	Marin Kitagawa	
2022	Kotaro Lives Alone	Sawaguchi	
2022	BanG Dream! Morfonication	Tōko Kirigaya	
2024	Loner Life in Another World	Gal Leader	
2025	Secrets of the Silent Witch	Casey Groves	
2025	Hands Off: Sawaranaide Kotesashi-kun	Aroma Kusunoki	
2026	Yoroi-Shinden Samurai Troopers	Kaede Narumi	
2026	The Ogre's Bride	Yuzu Shinonome	

=== Anime films ===
Year	Title	Role	Ref.
2021	BanG Dream! Film Live 2nd Stage	Tōko Kirigaya	
2022	BanG Dream! Poppin'Dream!	Tōko Kirigaya	

=== Video games ===
Year	Title	Role	Ref.
2018	Afterlost	Haruka	
2019	Help!!! Koi ga Oka Gakuen Otasuke-bu	Kirari Kurusu	
2020	BanG Dream! Girls Band Party!	Tōko Kirigaya	
2020	Brown Dust	Ashley	
2020	Kemono Friends 3	Bergman's Bear	
2022	Kyoutou Kotoba RPG: Kotodaman	Origan	
2023	Honkai: Star Rail	Guinaifen	
2025	100% Orange Juice	Haruka	
2025	Granblue Fantasy	Cherine	
2026	Nekopara: Sekai Connect	Karin	
