= Akari Akase =

Japanese cosplayer and singer (born 2001)

- あかせ あかり
- Born: July 30, 2001 (age 25); Aichi Prefecture, Japan
- Occupations: Cosplayer; gravure idol; Internet personality; actress; singer
- Years active: 2019–present
- Agent: SP-1

Akari Akase (あかせ あかり, Akase Akari; born July 30, 2001) is a Japanese singer, cosplayer, gravure idol, internet personality, and actress from Aichi Prefecture who is affiliated with SP-1. She started her entertainment activities as a cosplayer, gaining popularity on TikTok. In 2020, she made her debut as a gravure model, appearing in magazines such as Weekly Playboy as well as photobooks. In 2021, she made her debut as a television actress, and in 2022 she made her debut as a solo singer, releasing the song "Koi no Yukue" which was used as the ending theme to the anime television series My Dress-Up Darling.

== Biography ==
Akase was born in Aichi Prefecture on July 30, 2001. From an early age, she had an interest in anime, and until she became a junior high school student, she had a dream of appearing in the Pretty Cure franchise. When she was in high school she served as the manager of her school's volleyball club.

After retiring as the club's manager, she decided to take up cosplay due to her interest in anime. Cosplay would also be a way for her to spend money that she had earned from part-time jobs. She then decided to start a TikTok account, which quickly grew in popularity; as of November 2020 she had over 900,000 subscribers. It was also through her TikTok account where she was scouted for entertainment activities via a Twitter direct message. As she had longed to be an actress from childhood, and with the approval of her parents, she accepted the offer.

Akase's professional modelling debut was a swimsuit feature in Shueisha's Weekly Playboy magazine in March 2020. Later that year she released a photobook titled Semi to Hatsukoi (蝉と初恋。). In 2021 she made her debut as a television actress, appearing in the Fuji TV drama series Mr. Good-looking starring by Fūju Kamio and Shihori Kanjiya. By December 2021, her TikTok subscriber count had surpassed 1.2 million.

In 2022, Akase made her debut as a solo musician, releasing her first single "Koi no Yukue" (恋ノ行方) on February 23, 2022; the title song was used as the ending theme to the anime television series My Dress-Up Darling.

In March 2025, Akase appeared at Sakura Anime Garden in Singapore and at Cosplay Carnival in the Philippines.

== Filmography ==
=== Drama ===
- Mr. Good-looking (2021), Yuki Tanaka
- If My Favorite Pop Idol Made It to the Budokan, I Would Die (2022), Miyū
- Trillion Game (2023), Mizuki

== Discography ==
=== Singles ===
- "Koi no Yukue" (恋ノ行方) (Release date: February 23, 2022)
