= Shinichi Fukuda =

Japanese manga artist

- Notable works: Shibaraku (2009–?); Momoiro Meloic (2012–2016); My Dress-Up Darling (2018–2025)
- Awards: Ace Newcomer Manga Awards Encouragement Award (2006)

Shinichi Fukuda (福田 晋一, Fukuda Shin'ichi) is a Japanese manga artist. After winning the 23rd Ace Newcomer Manga Awards Encouragement Award and creating the serialized manga Shibaraku (2009–?) and Momoiro Meloic (2012–2016), she later created My Dress-Up Darling (2018–2025).

== Biography ==
Fukuda created numerous one-shots for Kadokawa's Monthly Shōnen Ace magazine, and in 2006, she won the Encouragement Award at the 23rd Ace Newcomer Manga Awards. She also contributed to The Recital of Haruhi Suzumiya (2009) and the Summer Wars Official Comic Anthology (2010).

Fukuda made her serial debut with Shibaraku, centered on a boy living in a dystopian world seeking revenge for the death of his mentor. It premiered in Monthly Shōnen Ace's first 15th anniversary issue, released in October 2009, and two tankobon volumes were released. Abema Times remarked that its action sequences "give it a unique appeal". From 2012 to 2016, she released another serialized manga, in this case in Shōnen Gahōsha's Young King: Momoiro Meloic, a romantic comedy about a love triangle involving a construction worker and her younger sister; Abema Times remarked that the work's character designs subsequently inspired My Dress-Up Darling. In January 2015, she held her first autograph session at Tsutaya Sangenjaya, open to those who got tickets free with a purchase of Momoiro Meloic's volume 6.

In January 2018, Fukuda launched her next serialized manga My Dress-Up Darling, a romantic comedy between a hina dollmaker and a gyaru. It serialized in Square Enix's Young Gangan until March 2025. The manga subsequently rose to popularity, being ranked sixth in the 2019 Next Manga Award print manga category and sixteenth in the 2010 edition of Kono Manga ga Sugoi!.

In 2020, she was one of the co-recipients for the Men's Comic Prize at NTT Solmare's "Minna ga Erabu!! Denshi Comic Taishō 2020", winning it for My Dress-Up Darling. The work also received an anime television adaptation and a television drama adaptation, as well as a manga spin-off titled My Dress-Up Darling XOXO!. She recalled in an interview with Comic Natalie that she cried when she saw the first two episodes of the anime before they premiered; spending thirteen hours watching them repeatedly.

Fukuda also designed the main visual for the manga's fifth anniversary exhibition, held at Matsuya Ginza in August 2023. Her manga had surpassed 12 million copies in circulation by November 2024, and by October 2025, it had reached 15 million.

Several social media users who met Fukuda at autograph signings have confirmed that she is female, with one fan remarking that "she has such a cute voice that it sounds like she might be a voice actress". Outside of autograph appearances, several fans had theorized she was female due to her accurate portrayals of feminine psychology and her delicate art style.

== Works ==
- Shibaraku (2009)
- Momoiro Meloic (2012–2016)
- My Dress-Up Darling (2018–2025)
