= 2025 in anime =

Events in 2025 in anime.

== Releases ==
=== Films ===
A list of anime films that were released in theaters between January 1 and December 31, 2025.

Release date	Title	Studio	Director(s)	Running time (minutes)	Ref.
January 17	Colorful Stage! The Movie: A Miku Who Can't Sing	P.A. Works	Hiroyuki Hata	105	
January 17	Mobile Suit Gundam GQuuuuuuX: Beginning	Sunrise; Studio Khara	Kazuya Tsurumaki	80	
January 24	Cute High Earth Defense Club Eternal Love!	Studio Comet	Shinji Takamatsu	81	
January 31	Make a Girl	Yasuda Gensho Studio by Xenotoon	Genshō Yasuda	92	
January 31	The Rose of Versailles	MAPPA	Ai Yoshimura	113	
February 14	Eiga Senpai wa Otokonoko: Ame Nochi Hare	Project No.9	Shinsuke Yanagi	82	
February 21	Hypnosis Mic: Division Rap Battle	Polygon Pictures	Takanori Tsujimoto	100	
March 7	Doraemon: Nobita's Art World Tales	Shin-Ei Animation	Yukiyo Teramoto	105	
March 14	Mononoke the Movie: The Ashes of Rage	EOTA	Kenji Nakamura	74	
April 11	Star Blazers: Space Battleship Yamato 3199: Part 3: Ultramarine Asteroid	Studio Mother	Harutoshi Fukui (Chief); Naomichi Yamato	100	
April 18	Detective Conan: One-eyed Flashback	TMS Entertainment	Katsuya Shigehara	110	
April 18	Gekijōban Boku to Roboco	Gallop	Akitaro Daichi	64	
May 9	Gekijōban Uta no Prince-sama Taboo Night XXXX	A-1 Pictures	Akiko Seki	56	
May 23	Kaitō Queen no Yūga na Kyūka	East Fish Studio	Shigetaka Ikeda	88	
May 23	Princess Principal: Crown Handler – Chapter 4	Actas	Masaki Tachibana	59	
June 27	Anpanman: Chapon's Hero!	TMS Entertainment	Toshikazu Hashimoto	58	
June 27	Lupin the IIIrd the Movie: The Immortal Bloodline	Telecom Animation Film	Takeshi Koike	93	
June 27	Miss Kobayashi's Dragon Maid: A Lonely Dragon Wants to Be Loved	Kyoto Animation	Tatsuya Ishihara	105	
June 27	Virgin Punk: Clockwork Girl	Shaft	Yasuomi Umetsu	35	
July 18	Demon Slayer: Kimetsu no Yaiba – The Movie: Infinity Castle (Part 1: Akaza Returns)	Ufotable	Haruo Sotozaki	155	
July 18	Toi-san	Seven Arcs	Mankyū	90	
August 8	Crayon Shin-chan the Movie: Super Hot! The Spicy Kasukabe Dancers	Shin-Ei Animation	Masakazu Hashimoto	105	
August 15	ChaO	Studio 4°C	Yasuhiro Aoki	90	
August 22	As One	Honoo; Studio Gooneys	Kōbun Shizuno	91	
August 22	Eiga Odekake Kozame: Tokai no Otomodachi	ENGI	Chihiro Kumano	74	
August 29	Fushigi no Kuni de Alice to: Dive in Wonderland	P.A. Works	Toshiya Shinohara	95	
September 12	You and Idol Pretty Cure the Movie: For You! Our Kirakilala Concert!	Toei Animation	Kouji Ogawa	71	
September 19	100 Meters	Rock 'n' Roll Mountain	Kenji Iwaisawa	95	
September 19	Chainsaw Man – The Movie: Reze Arc	MAPPA	Tatsuya Yoshihara	100	
October 10	Aikatsu! × PriPara The Movie: Deai no Kiseki!	Bandai Namco Pictures	Takahiro Ōkawa	75	
October 10	Star Blazers: Space Battleship Yamato 3199: Part 4: Light Blue Maiden (Sasha)	Studio Mother	Harutoshi Fukui (Chief); Naomichi Yamato	101	
October 10	The Last Blossom	CLAP	Baku Kinoshita	75	
October 24	Zombie Land Saga: Yumeginga Paradise	MAPPA	Kōnosuke Uda (Chief); Takeru Satō; Takafumi Ishida	120	
November 7	Love Live! Nijigasaki High School Idol Club Final Chapter (part 2)	Sunrise	Tomoyuki Kawamura	75	
November 7	The Obsessed	Shin-Ei Animation	Wataru Takahashi	98	
November 21	Scarlet	Studio Chizu	Mamoru Hosoda	111	
November 21	There's No Freaking Way I'll Be Your Lover! Unless... ~Next Shine~	Studio Mother	Natsumi Uchinuma	110	
December 5	Peleliu: Guernica of Paradise	Shin-Ei Animation; Fugaku	Gorō Kuji	106	
December 26	Girls und Panzer: Motto Love Love Sakusen Desu! – Act 1	P.A. Works; Actas	Masami Shimoda	77	
December 26	Whoever Steals This Book	Kagokan	Daisei Fukuoka	85	

=== Television series ===
A list of anime television series that debuted between January 1 and December 31, 2025.

First run start and end dates	Title	Episodes	Studio	Director(s)	Original title	Ref.
January 2 – April 3	Ameku M.D.: Doctor Detective	12	Project No.9	Kazuya Iwata	Ameku Takao no Suiri Karte	
January 2 – March 27	Ave Mujica: The Die Is Cast	13	Sanzigen	Kōdai Kakimoto	BanG Dream! Ave Mujica	
January 2 – March 27	Grisaia: Phantom Trigger the Animation	12	Bibury Animation Studios	Kousuke Murayama		
January 2 – March 28	Momentary Lily	13	GoHands	Shingo Suzuki (Chief); Susumu Kudo; Katsumasa Yokomine		
January 3 – March 21	I Got Married to the Girl I Hate Most in Class	12	Studio Gokumi; AXsiZ	Hiroyuki Oshima	Class no Dai Kirai na Joshi to Kekkon Suru Koto ni Natta	
January 4 – March 22	Beheneko: The Elf-Girl's Cat Is Secretly an S-Ranked Monster!	12	Zero-G; Saber Works	Tetsuo Hirakawa	S Rank Monster no "Behemoth" dakedo, Neko to Machigawarete Elf Musume no Pet Toshite Kurashitemasu	
January 4 – March 22	Sorairo Utility	12	Yostar Pictures	Kengo Saitō		
January 5 – March 23	Head Start at Birth (season 2)	12			0-Saiji Start Dash Monogatari	
January 5 – March 23	I Want to Escape from Princess Lessons	12	EMT Squared	Shinobu Tagashira	Kisaki Kyōiku kara Nigetai Watashi	
January 5 – June 22	I'm Living with an Otaku NEET Kunoichi!?	24	Quad	Hisashi Saito	NEET Kunoichi to Nazeka Dōsei Hajimemashita	
January 5 – March 30	Medalist	13	ENGI	Yasutaka Yamamoto		
January 5 – March 23	Okitsura: Fell in Love with an Okinawan Girl, but I Just Wish I Know What She's Saying	12	Millepensee	Shin Itagaki (Chief); Shingo Tanabe	Okinawa de Suki ni Natta Ko ga Hōgen Sugite Tsurasugiru	
January 5 – March 30	Solo Leveling: Arise from the Shadow	13	A-1 Pictures	Shunsuke Nakashige	Ore dake Level Up na Ken Season 2: Arise from the Shadow	
January 5 – March 23	Zenshu	12	MAPPA	Mitsue Yamazaki		
January 6 – March 24	Headhunted to Another World: From Salaryman to Big Four!	12	Geek Toys; CompTown	Michio Fukuda	Salaryman ga Isekai ni Ittara Shitennō ni Natta Hanashi	
January 6 – March 24	I Have a Crush at Work	12	Blade	Naoko Takeichi	Kono Kaisha ni Suki na Hito ga Imasu	
January 6 – April 9	My Happy Marriage (season 2)	13	Kinema Citrus	Takehiro Kubota; Masayuki Kojima	Watashi no Shiawase na Kekkon	
January 6 – March 24	Promise of Wizard	12	Liden Films	Naoyuki Tatsuwa	Mahōtsukai no Yakusoku	
January 7 – March 25	Bogus Skill "Fruitmaster"	12	Asahi Production	Ryuichi Kimura	Hazure Skill "Kinomi Master"	
January 7 – March 25	I'm a Noble on the Brink of Ruin, So I Might as Well Try Mastering Magic	12	Studio Deen; Marvy Jack	Kenichi Ishikura	Botsuraku Yotei no Kizoku dakedo, Hima datta kara Mahō o Kiwamete Mita	
January 7 – March 25	Medaka Kuroiwa Is Impervious to My Charms	12	SynergySP	Yoshiaki Okumura	Kuroiwa Medaka ni Watashi no Kawaii ga Tsūjinai	
January 7 – March 25	Unnamed Memory (season 2)	12	ENGI	Kazuya Miura		
January 8 – March 26	Flower and Asura	12	Studio Bind	Ayumu Uwano	Hana wa Saku, Shura no Gotoku	
January 8 – March 26	Ishura (season 2)	12	Passione; Sanzigen (CGI)	Takeo Takahashi (Chief); Yuki Ogawa		
January 8 – March 26	Possibly the Greatest Alchemist of All Time	12	Studio Comet	Naoyuki Kuzuya	Izure Saikyō no Renkinjutsushi?	
January 8 – March 26	Tasokare Hotel	12	PRA	Kōsuke Kuremizu		
January 9 – March 27	Dr. Stone: Science Future (part 1)	12	TMS Entertainment	Shūhei Matsushita		
January 9 – March 27	Even Given the Worthless "Appraiser" Class, I'm Actually the Strongest	12	Okuruto Noboru	Kenta Ōnishi	Fugūshoku "Kanteishi" ga Jitsu wa Saikyō Datta	
January 9 – March 27	Honey Lemon Soda	12	J.C.Staff	Hiroshi Nishikiori		
January 9 – March 27	Magic Maker: How to Make Magic in Another World	12	Studio Deen	Kazuomi Koga	Magic Maker: Isekai Mahō no Tsukurikata	
January 9 – April 3	The Daily Life of a Middle-Aged Online Shopper in Another World	13	East Fish Studio	Yoshihide Yūzumi	Around 40 Otoko no Isekai Tsūhan Seikatsu	
January 10 – March 28	Anyway, I'm Falling in Love with You	12	Typhoon Graphics	Junichi Yamamoto	Dōse, Koishite Shimaunda	
January 10 – March 28	Aquarion: Myth of Emotions	12	Satelight	Kenji Itoso	Sōsei no Aquarion: Myth of Emotions	
January 10 – March 28	Farmagia	12	Bridge	Shinji Ishihira (Chief); Toshihiko Sano		
January 10 – March 28	From Bureaucrat to Villainess: Dad's Been Reincarnated!	12	Ajiado	Tetsuya Takeuchi	Akuyaku Reijō Tensei Oji-san	
January 10 – July 4	The Apothecary Diaries (season 2)	24	Toho Animation Studio; OLM	Norihiro Naganuma (Chief); Akinori Fudesaka	Kusuriya no Hitorigoto	
January 10 – March 28	Welcome to Japan, Ms. Elf!	12	Zero-G	Tōru Kitahata	Nihon e Yōkoso Elf-san	
January 11 – March 29	Babanba Banban Vampire	12	Gaina	Itsuro Kawasaki		
January 11 – March 29	I May Be a Guild Receptionist, But I'll Solo Any Boss to Clock Out on Time	12	CloverWorks	Tsuyoshi Nagasawa	Guild no Uketsukejō Desu ga, Zangyō wa Iya nanode Boss wo Solo Tōbatsu Shiyō to Omoimasu	
January 11 – March 22	Sakamoto Days (part 1)	11	TMS Entertainment	Masaki Watanabe		
January 11 – March 29	Übel Blatt	12	Satelight; Staple Entertainment	Takashi Naoya		
January 11 – April 5	UniteUp! Uni:Birth	12	CloverWorks	Shinichiro Ushijima		
January 12 – June 29	I Left My A-Rank Party to Help My Former Students Reach the Dungeon Depths!	24	Bandai Namco Pictures	Katsumi Ono	A-Rank Party o Ridatsu Shita Ore wa, Moto Oshiego-tachi to Meikyū Shinbu o Mezasu	
January 12 – March 30	Kinnikuman: Perfect Origin Arc (season 2)	11	Production I.G	Akira Sato	Kinnikuman: Kanpeki Chōjin Shiso-hen	
January 12 – June 22	Mashin Creator Wataru	24	Bandai Namco Pictures	Yumi Kamakura	Mashin Sōzōden Wataru	
January 12 – March 30	The 100 Girlfriends Who Really, Really, Really, Really, Really Love You (season 2)	12	Bibury Animation Studios	Hikaru Sato	Kimi no Koto ga Dai Dai Dai Dai Daisuki na 100-nin no Kanojo	
January 12 – March 30	The Red Ranger Becomes an Adventurer in Another World	12	Satelight	Keiichiro Kawaguchi	Sentai Red Isekai de Bōkensha ni Naru	
January 12 – March 30	Toilet-Bound Hanako-kun (season 2 part 1)	12	Lerche	Yōhei Fukui	Jibaku Shōnen Hanako-kun	
January 12 – March 30	Witchy Pretty Cure!! Mirai Days	12	Toei Animation; Studio Deen	Takayuki Hamana	Mahōtsukai Precure!! Mirai Days	
February 2 – January 25, 2026	You and Idol Pretty Cure	49	Toei Animation	Chiaki Kon	Kimi to Idol Precure	
March 28	Twins Hinahima	1	KaKa Technology Studio	Kō Nakano		
March 31 – September 29	Sword of the Demon Hunter: Kijin Gentōshō	24	Yokohama Animation Laboratory	Kazuya Aiura	Kijin Gentōshō	
April 1 – June 17	Once Upon a Witch's Death	12	EMT Squared	Atsushi Nigorikawa	Aru Majo ga Shinu Made	
April 2 – June 18	Catch Me at the Ballpark!	12	EMT Squared	Jun'ichi Kitamura	Ballpark de Tsukamaete!	
April 2 – June 18	Please Put Them On, Takamine-san	12	Liden Films	Tomoe Makino	Haite Kudasai, Takamine-san	
April 2 – June 18	The Beginning After the End	12	Studio A-Cat	Keitaro Motonaga	Saikyō no Ōsama, Nidome no Jinsei wa Nani o Suru?	
April 2 – June 25	Your Forma	13	Geno Studio	Takaharu Ozaki		
April 3 – May 1	Miru: Paths to My Future	5	LinQ; Trif Studio; Scooter Films; Shirogumi; Reirs; Larx Entertainment; Studio Hibari	Norio Kashima; Okamoto; Tomohiro Kawamura; Naofumi Mishina; Saori Nakashiki	Miru: Watashi no Mirai	
April 3 – June 26	Rock Is a Lady's Modesty	13	Bandai Namco Pictures	Shinya Watada	Rock wa Lady no Tashinamideshite	
April 3 – June 19	The Brilliant Healer's New Life in the Shadows	12	Makaria	Joe Yoshizaki	Isshun de Chiryou shiteita no ni Yakudatazu to Tsuihousareta Tensai Chiyushi, Yami Healer to shite Tanoshiku Ikiru	
April 4 – September 12	Araiguma Calcal-dan	24	Nippon Animation	Henry Hirakawa		
April 4 – June 6	Bye Bye, Earth (season 2)	10	Liden Films	Yasuto Nishikata		
April 4 – June 20	Can a Boy-Girl Friendship Survive?	12	J.C.Staff	Yōhei Suzuki	Danjo no Yūjō wa Seiritsu Suru? (Iya, Shinai!!)	
April 4 – June 20	The Dinner Table Detective	12	Madhouse	Mitsuyuki Masuhara	Nazotoki wa Dinner no Ato de	
April 4 – June 20	Wind Breaker (season 2)	12	CloverWorks	Toshifumi Akai		
April 5 – September 27	Anne Shirley	24	The Answer Studio	Hiroshi Kawamata		
April 5 – June 28	Black Butler: Emerald Witch Arc	13	CloverWorks	Kenjirou Okada	Kuroshitsuji: Midori no Majo-hen	
April 5 – September 27	Everyday Host	24	Fanworks	Rarecho	Eburidei Hosuto	
April 5 – June 21	Fire Force (season 3, part 1)	12	David Production	Tatsuma Minamikawa	En'en no Shōbōtai	
April 5 – June 22	From Old Country Bumpkin to Master Swordsman	12	Passione; Hayabusa Film	Akio Kazumi	Katainaka no Ossan, Kensei ni Naru	
April 5 – June 21	Gag Manga Biyori Go	12	Studio Deen	Akitaro Daichi	Masuda Kōsuke Gekijō Gag Manga Biyori Go	
April 5 – May 24	Guilty Gear Strive: Dual Rulers	8	Sanzigen	Shigeru Morikawa		
April 5 – June 21	I've Been Killing Slimes for 300 Years and Maxed Out My Level (season 2)	12	Teddy	Kunihisa Sugishima	Slime Taoshite 300-nen, Shiranai Uchi ni Level Max ni Nattemashita: Sono Ni	
April 5 –	Kaijū Sekai Seifuku		DLE	Kinuta Ōshiro		
April 5 – June 28	Kowloon Generic Romance	13	Arvo Animation	Yoshiaki Iwasaki		
April 5 – September 27	Yaiba: Samurai Legend	24	Wit Studio	Takahiro Hasui	Shin Samurai-den Yaiba	
April 6 – June 29	Classic Stars	13	Platinum Vision	Hideaki Ōba		
April 6 – June 22	The Gorilla God's Go-To Girl	12	Kachigarasu	Fumitoshi Oizaki	Gorilla no Kami Kara Kago Sareta Reijō wa Ōritsu Kishidan de Kawaiigareru	
April 6 – June 22	I'm the Evil Lord of an Intergalactic Empire!	12	Quad	Tetsuya Yanagisawa	Ore wa Seikan Kokka no Akutoku Ryōshu!	
April 6 –	Koupen-chan		Lesprit	Kyō Yatate		
April 6 – June 29	Lazarus	13	MAPPA	Shinichirō Watanabe		
April 6 – June 22	Maebashi Witches	12	Sunrise	Junichi Yamamoto		
April 6 –	Princession Orchestra	48	Silver Link	Shin Oonuma		
April 6 – June 22	Shoshimin: How to Become Ordinary (season 2)	12	Lapin Track	Mamoru Kanbe	Shōshimin Series	
April 6 – June 22	The Unaware Atelier Master	12	EMT Squared	Hisashi Ishii	Kanchigai no Atelier Meister: Eiyū Party no Moto Zatsuyōgakari ga, Jitsu wa Sentō Igai ga SSS Rank Datta to Iu Yoku Aru Hanashi	
April 6 – June 29	Umamusume: Cinderella Gray (part 1)	13	CygamesPictures	Yūki Itō; Takehiro Miura		
April 6 – October 5	Witch Watch	25	Bibury Animation Studios	Hiroshi Ikehata		
April 7 – June 23	Aharen-san Is Indecipherable (season 2)	12	Felix Film	Yasutaka Yamamoto (Chief); Tomoe Makino	Aharen-san wa Hakarenai	
April 7 – June 23	Makina-san's a Love Bot?!	12	BloomZ	Masayoshi Nishida	Kakushite! Makina-san!!	
April 7 – June 23	The Mononoke Lecture Logs of Chuzenji-sensei	12	100studio	Chihiro Kumano	Chūzenji-sensei Mononoke Kōgiroku	
April 7 – June 30	My Hero Academia: Vigilantes	13	Bones Film	Kenichi Suzuki	Vigilante: Boku no Hero Academia Illegals	
April 7 – September 29	Summer Pockets	26	Feel	Tomoki Kobayashi		
April 7 – June 23	Yandere Dark Elf: She Chased Me All the Way From Another World!	12	Elias	Toshikatsu Tokoro	Chotto Dake Ai ga Omoi Dark Elf ga Isekai Kara Oikakete Kita	
April 7 – June 23	Zatsu Tabi: That's Journey	12	Makaria	Masaharu Watanabe		
April 8 – June 24	Chikuwa Senki: Ore no Kawaii Chikyū Shinryaku	12	Imagica Infos; Imageworks Studio	Satoshi Mizuno		
April 8 – June 24	#Compass 2.0: Combat Providence Analysis System	12	Lay-duce	Hitoshi Nanba	#Compass 2.0: Sentō Setsuri Kaiseki System	
April 8 – June 24	The Shiunji Family Children	12	Doga Kobo	Ryouki Kamitsubo	Shiunji-ke no Kodomo-tachi	
April 9 – June 23	Apocalypse Hotel	12	CygamesPictures	Kana Shundo		
April 9 – June 25	Hana-Doll*: Reinterpretation of Flowering	12	A-Real	Masahiro Takata		
April 9 – June 25	Mobile Suit Gundam GQuuuuuuX	12	Sunrise; Studio Khara	Kazuya Tsurumaki		
April 10 – June 26	A Ninja and an Assassin Under One Roof	12	Shaft	Yukihiro Miyamoto	Ninja to Koroshiya no Futarigurashi	
April 10 – September 18	Me and the Alien MuMu	24	OLM	Tomoya Takahashi	Uchūjin Mūmū	
April 10 – June 26	The Too-Perfect Saint: Tossed Aside by My Fiancé and Sold to Another Kingdom	12	Troyca	Shuu Watanabe	Kanpeki Sugite Kawaige ga Nai to Konyaku Haki Sareta Seijo wa Ringoku ni Urareru	
April 12 – June 28	Teogonia	12	Asahi Production	Kunihiro Mori		
April 13 – June 29	Food for the Soul	12	P.A. Works	Shinya Kawatsura; Yū Harumi	Hibi wa Sugiredo Meshi Umashi	
April 13 – June 29	Go! Go! Loser Ranger! (season 2)	12	Yostar Pictures	Keiichi Sato	Sentai Daishikkaku	
April 13 – June 29	Mono	12	Soigne	Ryota Aikei		
July 1 – September 16	Detectives These Days Are Crazy!	12	Liden Films	Rion Kujo	Mattaku Saikin no Tantei Tokitara	
July 1 – September 16	Necronomico and the Cosmic Horror Show	12	Studio Gokumi	Masato Matsune	Necronomico no Cosmic Horror Show	
July 2 – August 20	Chuhai Lips: Canned Flavor of Married Women	8	Raiose	Hajime Keima	Hitozuma no Kuchibiru wa Kan Chūhai no Aji ga Shite	
July 2 – September 17	Clevatess	12	Lay-duce	Kiyotaka Taguchi	Clevatess: Majū no Ō to Akago to Shikabane no Yūsha	
July 2 – September 24	Hell Teacher: Jigoku Sensei Nube (part 1)	13	Studio Kai	Yasuyuki Ōishi	Jigoku Sensei Nube	
July 2 – September 17	Reborn as a Vending Machine, I Now Wander the Dungeon (season 2)	12	Studio Gokumi; AXsiZ	Takashi Yamamoto	Jidōhanbaiki ni Umarekawatta Ore wa Meikyū o Samayō	
July 3 – September 25	Kamitsubaki City Under Construction	13	SMDE	Kōdai Kakimoto	Kamitsubaki-shi Kensetsu-chū	
July 3 – September 18	Milky Subway: The Galactic Limited Express	12	Shin-Ei Animation; Titan Productions	Yōhei Kameyama	Ginga Tokkyū Milky Subway	
July 3 – September 18	New Saga	12	Studio Clutch	Naoki Mizusawa	Tsuyokute New Saga	
July 3 – September 18	Onmyo Kaiten Re:Birth Verse	12	David Production	Hideya Takahashi	Onmyō Kaiten Re:verse	
July 3 – September 18	Welcome to the Outcast's Restaurant!	12	OLM Team Yoshioka	Jōji Shimura	Tsuihōsha Shokudō e Yōkoso!	
July 4 – September 26	April Showers Bring May Flowers	13	Silver Link	Mirai Minato	Busu ni Hanataba o	
July 4 – September 5	Arknights: Rise from Ember	10	Yostar Pictures	Yuki Watanabe		
July 4 – September 19	Call of the Night (season 2)	12	Liden Films	Tomoyuki Itamura	Yofukashi no Uta	
July 4 – September 19	Dandadan (season 2)	12	Science Saru	Fūga Yamashiro; Abel Góngora		
July 4 – September 26	The Water Magician	12	Typhoon Graphics; Wonderland	Hideyuki Satake	Mizuzokusei no Mahōtsukai	
July 5 – September 27	9-Nine: Ruler's Crown	13	PRA	Koichi Ohata		
July 5 – September 20	Betrothed to My Sister's Ex	12	LandQ Studios	Takayuki Kitagawa	Zutaboro Reijō wa Ane no Moto Konyakusha ni Dekiai Sareru	
July 5 – September 27	Fermat Kitchen	12	Domerica	Kazuya Ichikawa	Fermat no Ryōri	
July 5 – September 28	Private Tutor to the Duke's Daughter	12	Studio Blanc	Nobuyoshi Nagayama	Kōjo Denka no Kateikyōshi	
July 5 – September 27	Rascal Does Not Dream of Santa Claus	13	CloverWorks	Soichi Masui	Seishun Buta Yarō wa Santa Claus no Yume o Minai	
July 5 – September 20	Rent-A-Girlfriend (season 4)	12	TMS Entertainment	Kazuomi Koga	Kanojo, Okarishimasu	
July 5 – October 4	Secrets of the Silent Witch	13	Studio Gokumi	Takaomi Kanasaki (Chief); Yasuo Iwamoto	Silent Witch: Chinmoku no Majo no Kakushigoto	
July 5 – December 27	Watari-kun's ****** Is About to Collapse	26	Staple Entertainment	Takashi Naoya	Watari-kun no xx ga Hōkaisunzen	
July 6 – September 28	Apocalypse Bringer Mynoghra	13	Maho Film	Yūji Yanase	Isekai Mokushiroku Mynoghra: Hametsu no Bunmei de Hajimeru Sekai Seifuku	
July 6 – September 21	Bad Girl	12	Bridge	Jōji Furuta		
July 6 – September 28	Cultural Exchange with a Game Centre Girl	12	Nomad	Toshihiro Kikuchi	GaCen Shōjo to Ibunka Kōryū	
July 6 – December 22	Gachiakuta	24	Bones Film	Fumihiko Suganuma		
July 6 – September 28	Hotel Inhumans	13	Bridge	Tetsurō Amino		
July 6 – September 21	My Dress-Up Darling (season 2)	12	CloverWorks	Keisuke Shinohara	Sono Bisque Doll wa Koi o Suru	
July 6 – September 21	Puniru Is a Cute Slime (season 2)	12	Toho Animation Studio	Yūshi Ibe	Puniru wa Kawaii Slime	
July 6 – September 21	Reincarnated as a Neglected Noble: Raising My Baby Brother with Memories from My Past Life	12	Studio Comet	Masafumi Sato	Shiro Buta Kizoku desu ga Zense no Kioku ga Haeta node Hiyoko na Otōto Sodatemasu	
July 6 – September 28	Ruri Rocks	13	Studio Bind	Shingo Fujii	Ruri no Hōseki	
July 6 – September 28	The Fragrant Flower Blooms with Dignity	13	CloverWorks	Miyuki Kuroki	Kaoru Hana wa Rin to Saku	
July 6 – September 28	The Summer Hikaru Died	12	CygamesPictures	Ryōhei Takeshita	Hikaru ga Shinda Natsu	
July 6 – September 21	Toilet-Bound Hanako-kun (season 2, part 2)	12	Lerche	Yōhei Fukui	Jibaku Shōnen Hanako-kun	
July 6 – September 21	Uglymug, Epicfighter	12	White Fox	Toshiyuki Sone	Busamen Gachi Fighter	
July 6 – September 21	With You and the Rain	12	Lesprit	Tomohiro Tsukimisato	Ame to Kimi to	
July 7 – September 22	Binan Kōkō Chikyū Bōei-bu Haikara!	12	Studio Deen	Shinji Takamatsu	Binan Kōkō Chikyū Bōei-bu Love!	
July 7 – September 29	City the Animation	13	Kyoto Animation	Taichi Ishidate		
July 7 – September 22	Dekin no Mogura: The Earthbound Mole	12	Brain's Base	Hiroshi Ishiodori	Dekin no Mogura	
July 7 – September 22	Night of the Living Cat	12	OLM	Takashi Miike (Chief); Tomohiro Kamitani		
July 7 – August 11	See You Tomorrow at the Food Court	6	Atelier Pontdarc	Kazuomi Koga	Food Court de, Mata Ashita	
July 8 – September 23	A Couple of Cuckoos (season 2)	12	Okuruto Noboru	Masakazu Hishida	Kakkō no Iinazuke	
July 8 – September 23	Grand Blue Dreaming (season 2)	12	Zero-G; Liber	Shinji Takamatsu	Grand Blue	
July 8 – September 23	There's No Freaking Way I'll be Your Lover! Unless...	12	Studio Mother	Natsumi Uchinuma	Watashi ga Koibito ni Nareru Wakenaijan, Muri Muri! (*Muri Janakatta!?)	
July 9 – October 1	Mr. Osomatsu (season 4)	13	Pierrot Films	Yoshinori Odaka	Osomatsu-san	
July 9 – September 24	The Rising of the Shield Hero (season 4)	12	Kinema Citrus	Hitoshi Haga	Tate no Yūsha no Nariagari	
July 9 – September 24	Turkey! Time to Strike	12	Bakken Record	Susumu Kudo	Turkey!	
July 10 – September 25	Dealing with Mikadono Sisters Is a Breeze	12	P.A. Works	Tadahito Matsubayashi	Mikadono Sanshimai wa Angai, Choroi	
July 10 – September 25	Dr. Stone: Science Future (part 2)	12	TMS Entertainment	Shūhei Matsushita		
July 10 – September 25	I Was Reincarnated as the 7th Prince so I Can Take My Time Perfecting My Magical Ability (season 2)	12	Tsumugi Akita Animation Lab	Jin Tamamura	Tensei Shitara Dai Nana Ōji Datta no de, Kimama ni Majutsu o Kiwamemasu	
July 10 – September 25	New Panty & Stocking with Garterbelt	13	Trigger	Hiroyuki Imaishi		
July 10 – September 25	With Vengeance, Sincerely, Your Broken Saintess	12	Imagica Infos; Imageworks Studio	Chisaki	Kizu Darake Seijo Yori Hōfuku o Komete	
July 11 – September 27	Scooped Up by an S-Rank Adventurer!	12	Felix Film	Hiroshi Tamada	Yūsha Party o Tsuihō Sareta Shiro Madōshi, S-Rank Bōkensha ni Hirowareru	
July 11 – December 19	Solo Camping for Two	24	SynergySP	Jun Hatori	Futari Solo Camp	
July 11 – December 26	Tougen Anki	24	Studio Hibari	Ato Nonaka	Tōgen Anki	
July 12 – September 27	The Shy Hero and the Assassin Princesses	12	Connect	Noriaki Akitaya	Kizetsu Yūsha to Ansatsu Hime	
July 13 – September 28	Shūkan Ranobe Anime	12	Ziine Studio	Tomoyasu Murata; Masayuki Kitamura; Kazuya Shiraishi; Daisuke Nakano; Kaoruko Murakami		
July 15 – September 23	Sakamoto Days (part 2)	11	TMS Entertainment	Masaki Watanabe		
July 17 – September 18	Harmony of Mille-Feuille	10	Jumondou	Takuya Satō (Chief); Kiyoto Nakajima	Utagoe wa Mille-Feuille	
July 19 – September 27	Kaiju No. 8 (season 2)	11	Production I.G	Shigeyuki Miya	Kaijū 8-gō	
July 19 – September 27	Nukitashi the Animation	11	Passione	Nobuyoshi Nagayama	Nukige Mitai na Shima ni Sunderu Watashi wa Dō Surya Ii Desuka?	
July 24 – September 25	Let's Go Karaoke!	5	Doga Kobo	Asami Nakatani	Karaoke Iko!	
August 21 – September 18	Captivated, by You	5	Doga Kobo	Asami Nakatani	Muchū sa, Kimi ni.	
August 25	Cocoon	1	Sasayuri	Toko Ina		
September 26 – December 19	Dusk Beyond the End of the World	12	P.A. Works	Naokatsu Tsuda	Towa no Yūgure	
October 1 – December 17	Hero Without a Class: Who Even Needs Skills?!	12	Studio A-Cat	Kaoru Yabana	Mushoku no Eiyū: Betsu ni Skill Nanka Iranakattan da ga	
October 1 – December 18	Kakuriyo: Bed & Breakfast for Spirits (season 2)	12	Gonzo; Makaria	Joe Yoshizaki	Kakuriyo no Yadomeshi Ni	
October 1 – December 17	Yano-kun's Ordinary Days	12	Ajiado	Shinpei Matsuo	Yano-kun no Futsū no Hibi	
October 2 – December 18	A Star Brighter Than the Sun	12	Studio Kai	Aya Kobayashi	Taiyō Yori mo Mabushii Hoshi	
October 2 – December 18	Let's Play	12	OLM	Daiki Tomiyasu	Let's Play: Quest-darake no My Life	
October 2 – December 18	My Awkward Senpai	12	Studio Elle	Ayumu Kotake	Bukiyō na Senpai	
October 2 – December 25	This Monster Wants to Eat Me	13	Studio Lings	Naoyuki Kuzuya (Chief); Yūsuke Suzuki	Watashi o Tabetai, Hito de Nashi	
October 3 – December 19	Backstabbed in a Backwater Dungeon	12	J.C.Staff	Katsushi Sakurabi	Shinjiteita Nakama-tachi ni Dungeon Okuchi de Korosarekaketa ga Gift "Mugen Gacha" de Level 9999 no Nakama-tachi o Te ni Irete Moto Party Member to Sekai ni Fukushū & "Zamaa!" Shimasu!	
October 3 – March 27, 2026	Ganglion		Studio Maf	Ayumu Watanabe		
October 3 –	Hyakushō Kizoku (season 3)		Pie in the sky	Yūtarō Sawada		
October 3 – December 19	I Saved Myself with a Potion!: Life in Another World	12	Imagica Infos; Imageworks Studio	Mikiko Furukawa	Potion, Waga Mi o Tasukeru	
October 3 – December 19	Style of Hiroshi Nohara Lunch	12	DLE	Tsukasa Nishiyama		
October 3 – December 19	Pass the Monster Meat, Milady!	12	Asahi Production	Mutsumi Takeda	Akujiki Reijō to Kyōketsu Kōshaku: Sono Mamono, Watashi ga Oishiku Itadakimasu!	
October 3 – December 26	Shabake	13	Bandai Namco Pictures	Takahiro Ōkawa		
October 4 – December 13	A Wild Last Boss Appeared!	12	Wao World	Yūya Horiuchi	Yasei no Last Boss ga Arawareta!	
October 4 – December 20	Inexpressive Kashiwada and Expressive Oota	12	Studio Polon	Tomohiro Kamitani	Kao ni Denai Kashiwada-san to Kao ni Deru Ōta-kun	
October 4 –	Kagaku×Bōken Survival! (season 2)		Gallop	Masahiro Hosoda		
October 4 – December 20	May I Ask for One Final Thing?	13	Liden Films Kyoto Studio	Kazuya Sakamoto	Saigo ni Hitotsu dake Onegai Shite mo Yoroshii Deshō ka	
October 4 – December 13	My Hero Academia (season 8)	11	Bones	Kenji Nagasaki (Chief); Naomi Nakayama	Boku no Hero Academia	
October 4 – December 20	Sanda	12	Science Saru	Tomohisa Shimoyama		
October 4 – December 27	Spy × Family (season 3)	13	Wit Studio; CloverWorks	Yukiko Imai		
October 4 – December 27	Tales of Wedding Rings (season 2)	13	Staple Entertainment	Takashi Naoya	Kekkon Yubiwa Monogatari	
October 4 – December 20	The Banished Court Magician Aims to Become the Strongest	12	Gekkou	Ken Takahashi	Mikata ga Yowasugite Hojo Mahō ni Tesshiteita Kyūtei Mahōshi, Tsuihō Sarete Saikyō o Mezasu	
October 4 – March 29, 2026	To Your Eternity (season 3)	22	Drive; Studio Massket	Kiyoko Sayama (Chief); Sōta Yokote	Fumetsu no Anata e	
October 4 – December 20	Touring After the Apocalypse	12	Nexus	Yoshinobu Tokumoto	Shūmatsu Touring	
October 5 – December 14	Alma-chan Wants to Be a Family!	11	Studio Flad	Yasuhiro Minami	Alma-chan wa Kazoku ni Naritai	
October 5 – March 1, 2026	Blue Orchestra (season 2)	21	Nippon Animation	Seiji Kishi	Ao no Orchestra	
October 5 – September 27, 2026	Digimon Beatbreak	49	Toei Animation	Hiroaki Miyamoto		
October 5 – December 27	Kingdom (season 6)	13	Pierrot; Studio Signpost	Kenichi Imaizumi		
October 5 – December 21	Mechanical Marie	12	Zero-G; Liber	Junji Nishimura	Kikaijikake no Marie	
October 5 – December 21	My Friend's Little Sister Has It In for Me!	12	Blade	Kazuomi Koga	Tomodachi no Imōto ga Ore ni Dake Uzai	
October 5 – December 21	Ranma ½ (season 2)	12	MAPPA	Kōnosuke Uda	Ranma Nibun-no-Ichi	
October 5 – December 21	Dad Is a Hero, Mom Is a Spirit, I'm a Reincarnator	12	J.C.Staff	Toshinori Fukushima	Chichi wa Eiyū, Haha wa Seirei, Musume no Watashi wa Tenseisha	
October 5 – March 29, 2026	Si-Vis: The Sound of Heroes	24	Studio VOLN	Daisuke Yoshida		
October 5 – March 21, 2026	Tojima Wants to Be a Kamen Rider	24	Liden Films	Takahiro Ikezoe	Tōjima Tanzaburō wa Kamen Rider ni Naritai	
October 5 – December 21	Umamusume: Cinderella Gray (part 2)	10	CygamesPictures	Yūki Itō; Takehiro Miura		
October 6 – December 29	A Mangaka's Weirdly Wonderful Workplace	13	Voil	Kaoru Suzuki	Egao no Taenai Shokuba Desu	
October 6 – December 15	Let This Grieving Soul Retire! (part 2)	11	Zero-G	Masahiro Takata	Nageki no Bōrei wa Intai Shitai	
October 6 – December 23	Plus-Sized Misadventures in Love!	12	Marvy Jack	Kazuomi Koga	Debu to Love to Ayamachi to!	
October 6 – December 22	Hands Off: Sawaranaide Kotesashi-kun	12	Quad	Hisashi Saito	Sawaranaide Kotesashi-kun	
October 7 – December 16	2200-Nen Neko no Kuni Nippon	12	Imagica Infos; Imageworks Studio			
October 7 – December 22	A Gatherer's Adventure in Isekai	12	Tatsunoko Production; SynergySP	Yoshinori Odaka	Sozai Saishuka no Isekai Ryokōki	
October 7 – March 31, 2026	Chitose Is in the Ramune Bottle (part 1)	13	Feel	Yūji Tokuno	Chitose-kun wa Ramune Bin no Naka	
October 7 – December 23	Gintama: Mr. Ginpachi's Zany Class	12	Bandai Namco Pictures	Makoto Moriwaki (Chief); Natsumi Higashida	3-Nen Z-Gumi Ginpachi-Sensei	
October 7 – December 23	My Status as an Assassin Obviously Exceeds the Hero's	12	Sunrise	Nobuyoshi Habara	Assassin de Aru Ore no Status ga Yūsha Yori mo Akiraka ni Tsuyoi Nodaga	
October 8 – December 24	Campfire Cooking in Another World with My Absurd Skill (season 2)	12	MAPPA	Kiyoshi Matsuda	Tondemo Skill de Isekai Hōrō Meshi	
October 8 – December 24	Ninja vs. Gokudo	12	Studio Deen	Toshinori Watanabe	Ninja to Gokudō	
October 8 – December 24	Wandance	12	Madhouse; Cyclone Graphics	Michiya Kato		
October 9 – December 25	The Dark History of the Reincarnated Villainess	12	Studio Deen	Hiroaki Sakurai	Tensei Akujo no Kuro Rekishi	
October 12 – December 28	One-Punch Man (season 3, part 1)	12	J.C.Staff	Shinpei Nagai	Wanpanman	
October 12 – March 15, 2026	Gnosia	21	Domerica	Kazuya Ichikawa		
October 12 – December 28	Li'l Miss Vampire Can't Suck Right	12	Feel	Sayaka Yamai	Chanto Suenai Kyūketsuki-chan	
October 13 – December 22	Isekai Quartet (season 3)	11	Studio Puyukai	Minoru Ashina		
October 14 – December 30	With You, Our Love Will Make It Through	12	Millepensee	Shin Itagaki; Hiromi Kimura	Kimi to Koete Koi ni Naru	
October 21 – December 23	Monster Strike: Deadverse Reloaded	10	Yumeta Company	Masao Ōkubo		
November 8 – November 9	Future Kid Takara	11	Studio 4°C	Yuta Sano		
December 4 – March 12, 2026	Kanagawa Elves	12	Imagica Infos; Imageworks Studio	Yūji Umoto	Kanagawa ni Sunderu Erufu	
December 20 – March 28, 2026	Blue Miburo (season 2)	14	Maho Film	Kumiko Habara	Ao no Miburo	

=== Original net animations ===
A list of original net animations that debuted between January 1 and December 31, 2025.

First run start and end dates	Title	Episodes	Studio	Director(s)	Original title	Ref.
February 27	Kairyū to Yūbinya-san	1	CoMix Wave Films	Taku Kimura		
April 1 – April 5	Koisuru One Piece	5	Toei Animation	Yū Kamatani; Hazuki Omoya		
April 10	Moonrise	18	Wit Studio	Masashi Koizuka		
April 16 – May 21	Lycoris Recoil: Friends Are Thieves of Time	6	A-1 Pictures	Shingo Adachi		
April 30 – May 6	Umayuru: Pretty Gray	4	Scooter Films	Sawako Yuno		
June 20	Lupin the IIIrd: Zenigata to Futari no Lupin		Telecom Animation Film	Takeshi Koike		
June 25	Shinsei Galverse	1	S.o.K	Ayaka Ōhira		
June 28 – August 2	Takopi's Original Sin	6	Enishiya	Shinya Iino	Takopi no Genzai	
July 4	Sugar Sugar Rune Les deux sorcières	1	Studio Khara	Yusuke Matsui		
July 10	Leviathan	12	Orange	Christophe Ferreira		
July 16 – August 13	Bullet/Bullet	12	E&H Production	Sunghoo Park		
July 24	My Melody & Kuromi	12	Toruku Studio	Tomoki Misato		
September 4	Pokémon Concierge (part 2)		Dwarf Studios	Iku Ogawa		
September 26 –	Cat's Eye	12	Liden Films	Yoshifumi Sueda		
October 2 –	Ganso! Bandori-chan	52		Kenshirō Morii; Seiya Miyajima		
October 2 –	Koala's Diary		Studio Mother	Takao Kato	Koala Enikki	
October 15	Ugoku! Neko Mukashi Banashi		Studio Comet	Kazumi Nonaka		
October 29 – December 17	Disney Twisted-Wonderland: The Animation (season 1)	8	Yumeta Company; Graphinica	Takahiro Natori (Chief); Shin Katagai		
October 29	Star Wars: Visions (season 3)	9	Kamikaze Douga; Anima; Kinema Citrus; Production I.G; Studio Trigger; Wit Studio; Project Studio Q; Polygon Pictures; David Production	Takanobu Mizuno; Hitoshi Haga; Naoyoshi Shiotani; Masaki Tachibana; Masahiko Otsuka; Junichi Yamamoto; Hiroyasu Kobayashi; Tadahiro Yoshihira; Shinya Ohira		
October 31 – December 19	The Lenticulars	8	Studio Trigger	Akira Amemiya		
November 7	Tatsuki Fujimoto 17–26	8	Zexcs; Lapin Track; Studio Graph77; 100studio; Studio Kafka; P.A. Works	Seishirō Nagaya; Nobukage Kimura; Nobuyuki Takeuchi; Naoya Ando; Tetsuaki Watanabe; Kazuaki Terasawa; Shū Honma		
December 10	Record of Ragnarok (season 3)	15	Yumeta Company; Maru Animation	Koichi Hatsumi	Shūmatsu no Walküre	

=== Original video animations ===
A list of original video animations that debuted between January 1 and December 31, 2025.

First run start and end dates	Title	Episodes	Studio	Director(s)	Original title	Ref.
March 19	SK8 the Infinity Extra Part	4	Bones	Hiroko Utsumi		
April 25	KonoSuba 3 -Bonus Stage-	2	Drive	Yujiro Abe		

== Deaths ==
=== January ===
- January 6: Dale Wilson, Canadian voice actor (voice of Cell in the Ocean Productions dub of Dragon Ball Z, Smokescreen in Transformers: Armada, Clow Reed in Cardcaptor Sakura), dies at age 82.
- January 8:
  - Yoichi Onishi, Japanese animator and animation supervisor (Dragon Ball, Rilu Rilu Fairilu, Run for Money: The Great Mission, Mazica Party).
  - Hiroshi Shinkawa, Japanese composer and arranger (Cat's Eye, Kimagure Orange Road, Ninja Scroll, Wanna-Be's, Boyfriend), dies at age 69 from ischemic heart failure.
- January 29: Atomu Shimojō, Japanese voice actor (voice of Futoshi Tsutsui in Human Crossing), dies at age 78 from acute subdural hematoma.

=== February ===
- February 2: Nobumasa Konagai, Japanese manga editor (Glass Mask, Sukeban Deka), dies at age 94.
- February 9: William H. Bassett, American actor (voices in Ah! My Goddess: The Movie, Mobile Suit Gundam 0083: Stardust Memory, Ghost in the Shell: Stand Alone Complex), dies at age 89.
- February 16: Osamu Miyawaki, Japanese businessman (founder of anime figure manufacturer Kaiyodo), dies at age 96.

=== March ===
- March 11: Dave Mallow, American voice actor (voice of Angemon in Digimon), dies at age 76.
- March 18: Yōko Kawanami, Japanese voice actress (voice of Coconna Vartla in Armored Trooper Votoms, Midori Norimaki in Dr. Slump, Mika Hyūga in God Mars), dies at age 67.

=== April ===
- April 15: Ken Shiroyama, Japanese voice actor (voice of Ebizō in Naruto Shippuden, Dr. Meisel in Spriggan, Gametsu in UFO Warrior Dai Apolon), dies at age 92.

=== May ===
- May 7: Kunichika Harada, Japanese manga artist (Pro Wrestling Superstar Retsuden, Kimura), dies at age 73 from a heart attack.
- May 13: Kiara, Japanese musician and bassist of NoisyCell (performed ending themes for Barakamon, Death Parade, Mr. Tonegawa), dies.

=== June ===
- June 11: Ayumu Saito, Japanese actor (voice of Wabisuke Jin'ouchi in Summer Wars), dies at age 60.

=== July ===
- July 4: Bill Flynn, American voice actor (voice of Hiroshi Agasa in Funimation version of Case Closed, Genzo in One Piece, Roy in Attack on Titan), dies at age 86.
- July 8: James Carter Cathcart, American voice actor (voice of James, Meowth, and Professor Oak in Pokémon), dies at age 71.
- July 22: Tsunehiko Kamijō, Japanese actor, singer and voice actor (voice of Mamma Aiuto Boss in Porco Rosso, Gonza in Princess Mononoke, Chichiyaku in Spirited Away), dies at age 85.

=== August ===
- August 1: Akiko Sekine, Japanese voice actress (voice of Shizuko Hiramatsu in Shoot!, Spring Goddess in Sally the Witch, Queen of Filena in Eternal Filena, Serina Hiyu in Deadly Arts, Mio Kisaragi in Tokimeki Memorial), dies.
- August 9: Nobuo Yamada, Japanese singer (Make-Up, Project.R), dies from kidney cancer at age 61.
- August 13: Tomo Sakurai, Japanese voice actress (voice of Misao Makimachi in Rurouni Kenshin, Mizuchi Saio in Yu-Gi-Oh! GX, Cynthia in Pokémon, Mylene Jenius in Macross 7, Meimi Haneoka/Saint Tail in Saint Tail), dies from cancer at age 53.
- August 20: Tatsuya Nagamine, Japanese anime director (One Piece, Dragon Ball Super, Pretty Cure, Digimon), dies at age 53.
- August 27: Takaya Hashi, Japanese voice actor (voice of Toki in Fist of the North Star, Inuarashi in One Piece, James Black in Case Closed), dies at age 72.

=== September ===
- September 2: Kazuko Yoshiyuki, Japanese actress (voice of Toki in Ponyo, Nanny in When Marnie Was There), dies at age 90.

=== November ===
- November 11: Tatsuya Nakadai, Japanese actor (voice of the Devil in Belladonna of Sadness, Narrator in Final Yamato, Sumiyaki no Roujini in The Tale of the Princess Kaguya, old Junpei Senō in Giovanni's Island), dies at age 92.
- November 20: Julie Mayfield, American voice actress (voice of Dr. Kureha in One Piece, Kyoko Honda in Fruits Basket, Eva Kaden in Case Closed, Queen Victoria in Black Butler), dies at age 67.
- November 29: Tomomichi Nishimura, Japanese voice actor (voice of Mitsuyoshi Anzai in Slam Dunk, the Narrator in YuYu Hakusho), dies at age 79.

=== December ===
- December 4: Arunee Nanthiwat, Thai voice actress (Thai dub voice of Chichi, Android 18, and Dende in Dragon Ball Z, Sailor Mars and Sailor Jupiter in Sailor Moon, Ranma Saotome in Ranma ½, Syaoran Li in Cardcaptor Sakura, Mai Kujaku in Yu-Gi-Oh! Duel Monsters), dies at age 69.
- December 10: Jim Ward, American voice actor (English dub voice of River Spirit in Spirited Away), dies at age 66.
- December 14: Ryō Ishihara, Japanese voice actor (voice of Jet Link/Cyborg 002 in Cyborg 009, Richter in Future War 198X, Zhang Zhao in Sangokushi [3] Harukanaru Daichi), dies from acute heart failure at age 94.
- December 17: Juli Erickson, American voice actress (voice of Pinako Rockbell in Fullmetal Alchemist, Tsuru and Kokoro in One Piece, Shima in Ouran High School Host Club, Shizuka in Kodocha, Ohba in Fairy Tail, Setsu in Samurai 7, Ogen in Basilisk, Setsuno in Toriko), dies at age 86.
- December 16: Jefferson Utanes, Filipino voice actor (Filipino dub voice of Goku in the Dragon Ball series, Kousei Arima in Your Lie in April, Kogoro Mori and Mitsuhiko Tsuburaya in Detective Conan, and Doraemon in Doraemon), dies from chronic kidney disease at age 46.
