= Bridge (studio) =

Japanese animation studio

Bridge Inc.
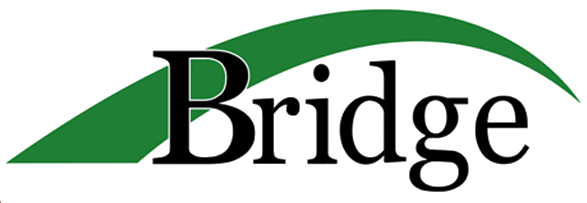
- Native name: 株式会社ブリッジ
- Romanized name: Kabushiki-gaisha Burijji
- Type: Kabushiki gaisha
- Industry: Japanese animation
- Founded: October 8, 2007; 19 years ago
- Headquarters: Kami-igusa, Suginami, Tokyo, Japan
- Key people: Chieo Ohashi (Representative Director); Nobuhiro Kondo (Director)
- Net income: ¥8,000,000
- Subsidiaries: Aisle
- Website: www.bridge-inc.co.jp

Bridge Inc. (Japanese: 株式会社ブリッジ, Hepburn: Kabushiki-gaisha Burijji) is a Japanese animation studio founded in 2007 by former staff from Sunrise.

== History ==
Bridge was founded by members of Sunrise's 6th studio while producing Sgt. Frog.

== Works ==
=== Television series ===
Year	Title	Director(s)	Animation producer(s)	Source	Eps.	Refs.
2010	Mitsudomoe	Masahiko Ohta	Youichi Watanabe	Manga	13	
2011	Mitsudomoe Zōryōchū!	Masahiko Ohta	Youichi Watanabe	Manga	8	
2013	Devil Survivor 2: The Animation	Seiji Kishi	Yasuo Suda	Video game	13	
2014	Nobunagun	Nobuhiro Kondo	Youichi Watanabe	Manga	13	
2014–2019	Fairy Tail (episodes 176–328 (S2–S3); co-animated with A-1 Pictures & CloverWorks (S3))	Shinji Ishihira	Hiroshi Iijima; Koutarou Nakayama	Manga	153	
2016	Seisen Cerberus: Ryūkoku no Fatalite	Nobuhiro Kondo	Koutarou Nakayama; Kimiha Makino	Mobile game	13	
2016–2017	Flowering Heart (co-animated with DR Movie & DR Busan)	Shinji Ishihira	Hiroshi Iijima	Original work	52	
2016–2019	Shōnen Ashibe GO! GO! Goma-chan (S1–S3) (co-animated with Husio Studio (S1–S2) and Studio Palette (S3))	Nobuhiro Kondo	Koutarou Nakayama; Takashi Iguchi	Manga	96	
2017	The Royal Tutor	Katsuya Kikuchi	Hiroshi Iijima	Manga	12	
2017–2018	Cardfight!! Vanguard G: Z (co-animated with OLM)	Nobuhiro Kondo	Tsukasa Koitabashi	Card game	24	
2018	The Seven Heavenly Virtues	Shinji Ishihira	Hiroshi Iijima	Manga	10	
2020	Talentless Nana	Shinji Ishihira	Hiroshi Iijima	Manga	13	
2020–2021	Pon Qiao Booth	Hashizou	Akira Tsunoda	Original work	22	
2020–2022	Yu-Gi-Oh! Sevens	Nobuhiro Kondo	Kouto Tono	Original work/manga	92	
2021–2022	Shaman King	Jouji Furuta	Hiroshi Iijima; Koutarou Nakayama	Manga	52	
2022-2025	Yu-Gi-Oh! Go Rush!!	Nobuhiro Kondo	Kimiha Makino	Original work/manga	151	
2024	Shaman King: Flowers	Jouji Furuta	Hiroshi Iijima; Akira Tsunoda	Manga	13	
2025	Farmagia	Shinji Ishihira; Toshihiko Sano	Akira Tsunoda	Video game	12	
2025	Bad Girl	Jouji Furuta	Hiroshi Iijima	Manga	12	
2025–present	Hotel Inhumans (co-animated with Aisle (S2))	Tetsurō Amino	TBA	Manga	TBA	
2026	The World's Strongest Witch (co-animated with Aisle)	Jouji Furuta	TBA	Light novel	TBA	

=== OVAs/ONAs ===
Year	Title	Director(s)	Animation producer(s)	Source	Eps.	Refs.
2012	Ichigeki Sacchuu!! Hoihoi-san: Legacy	Itsuro Kawasaki	—N/a	Manga	1	
2015	Ragnarok	Kazuyoshi Katayama	—N/a	Original work	1	
2018	The Seven Heavenly Virtues	Shinji Ishihira	Hiroshi Iijima	Manga	4	

=== Gross outsource works ===
Works in which Bridge served as "gross outsource" (full outsource) studio, either across an entire series or individual episodes.

- Saint Seiya: Soul of Gold (Toei Animation, 2015)

== Notable staff ==
=== Representative staff ===
- Chieo Oohashi (founder and president)
- Nobuhiro Kondo (director)

=== Animation producers ===
- Yasuo Suda (2008~2013) founded NAZ
- Youichi Watanabe (2008~2014) moved to NAZ
- Hiroshi Iijima (2008~present)
- Kimiha Makino (2010~present)
- Koutarou Nakayama (2014~present)

== See also ==
- NAZ – Studio founded by ex-Bridge staff.
