= Talentless Nana =

Japanese manga series

- First tankōbon volume cover, featuring Nana Hiiragi

無能なナナ (Munō na Nana)
- Genre: Psychological thriller; Suspense
- Manga
- Written by: Looseboy
- Illustrated by: Iori Furuya
- Published by: Square Enix
- English publisher: Crunchyroll (former); Square Enix (current)
- Magazine: Monthly Shōnen Gangan
- Original run: May 12, 2016 – July 10, 2026
- Volumes: 15
- Anime television series
- Directed by: Shinji Ishihira
- Written by: Fumihiko Shimo
- Music by: Yasuharu Takanashi (Team-MAX)
- Studio: Bridge
- Licensed by: Crunchyroll (Note: In North America through Crunchyroll, LLC (formerly known as Funimation).); SA/SEA: Muse Communication
- Original network: AT-X, Tokyo MX, SUN, TVA
- English network: US: Crunchyroll Channel
- Original run: October 4, 2020 – December 27, 2020
- Episodes: 13
- icon

Talentless Nana (Japanese: 無能なナナ, Hepburn: Munō na Nana) is a Japanese manga series written by Looseboy and illustrated by Iori Furuya. It was serialized in Square Enix's shōnen manga magazine Monthly Shōnen Gangan from May 2016 to July 2026, with its chapters collected in fifteen tankōbon volumes. The manga is published digitally in North America by Square Enix. An anime television series adaptation by Bridge aired from October to December 2020.

== Plot ==
In the near future, mysterious monsters known as the "Enemies of Humanity" begin to appear, and with it so do children with supernatural powers called the "Talented". To prepare them for the upcoming battle against these Enemies, all the Talented are sent to a school located on a deserted island, where they have all their daily needs provided for until they graduate and communication with the outside world is forbidden. One day, a new student named Nana Hiiragi arrives at the school. Her friendly and cheerful personality lets her quickly make friends with the class. In reality, however, Nana is a Talentless government assassin who has been dispatched to kill the Talented, whom the government deems to be the true Enemies of Humanity.

== Characters ==
Nana Hiiragi (柊 ナナ, Hiiragi Nana)
Voiced by: Rumi Okubo (Japanese); Michelle Marie (English)
Nana is the true protagonist of the series. One of the newest students on the island. She claims to have the talent of mind-reading and possesses a very affable and extroverted personality that lets her make friends easily. In reality, she is a Talentless assassin sent by the government to quietly eliminate all of her classmates. Nana's true persona is one that is incredibly skilled, intelligent, and observant, utilizing deductive reasoning and social engineering techniques to maintain her facade and evade suspicion.
Nanao Nakajima (中島 ナナオ, Nakajima Nanao)
Voiced by: Hiro Shimono, Mai Nakahara (young) (Japanese); Caleb Yen, Emi Lo (young) (English)
Nanao is the false protagonist of the series. A timid boy from a wealthy family who feels pressured by his father to become a leader wherever he goes. At first, he is seen as a Talentless student and the initial protagonist, but later reveals his talent is the ability to cancel out the effects of other talents by touching them.
Kyoya Onodera (小野寺 キョウヤ, Onodera Kyōya)
Voiced by: Yūichi Nakamura (Japanese); Stephen Fu (English)
A mysterious transfer student who arrived in school the same time as Nana, with the talent of immortality. Although he has an overbearing demeanor and prefers to keep to himself, he wishes to make friends and is a bit of an otaku. Like Nana, he is extremely observant and quick to uptake. He begins suspecting her involvement in the students' deaths and investigating the truth behind the Enemies of Humanity after his younger sister arrived at the same island and disappeared five years prior.
Michiru Inukai (犬飼 ミチル, Inukai Michiru)
Voiced by: Mai Nakahara (Japanese); Emi Lo (English)
A kind girl whom Nana often thinks resembles a puppy. She has the talent to heal others by licking their wounds, but cannot cure illnesses and the drawback of her talent is that it shortens her lifespan quickly. Her naive nature leads her to trust Nana wholeheartedly.
Yohei Shibusawa (渋沢 ヨウヘイ, Shibusawa Yōhei)
Voiced by: Toshiki Masuda (Japanese); Alan Lee (English)
An arrogant and perfectionistic student who cares deeply about propriety and dreams of using his talent to change history. He can travel up to 24 hours into the past from a certain spot, although its drawback is that he can only do so if he is not perceived by others, at which point he teleports back into the present. In addition, the longer the jump back in time he makes, the more energy he uses.
Moguo Iijima (飯島 モグオ, Iijima Moguo)
Voiced by: Takuya Nakashima (Japanese); Jordan Dash Cruz (English)
The class bully with the talent of pyrokinesis. Despite being loud, aggressive and self-centered, he worries for his henchmen and fellow classmates.
Shoichi Kosakai (小堺 ショイチ, Kosakai Shoichi)
Voiced by: Yūki Inoue (Japanese); Phillip Reich (English)
A student who is one of Moguo's henchmen.
Sota Saito (斉藤 ソウタ, Saito Sōta)
Voiced by: Takeo Ōtsuka
A student who is one of Moguo's henchmen.
Rentaro Tsurumigawa (鶴見川 レンタロウ, Tsurumigawa Rentarō)
Voiced by: Yoshitaka Yamaya (Japanese); Lucien Dodge (English)
A student who is one of Moguo's henchmen. He has the talent to have out-of-body experiences, with his spirit freely able to detach itself from his body and interact with objects, although this leaves his body defenseless.
Seiya Kori (郡 セイヤ, Kori Seiya)
Voiced by: Hiromichi Tezuka (Japanese); Phillip Reich (English)
A flamboyant and flirty student with the talent of cryokinesis.
Kirara Habu (羽生 キララ, Habu Kirara)
Voiced by: Yukina Tsutsumi (Japanese); Courtney Lin (English)
A gyaru who likes to bully Michiru. She is Kaori's best friend and her talent gives her poisonous saliva, although she must consume frogs and snakes regularly to maintain this.
Kaori Takanashi (高梨 カオリ, Takanashi Kaori)
Voiced by: Yurie Kozakai (Japanese); Heather Gonzalez (English)
A gyaru who likes to bully Michiru. She is Kirara's best friend and her talent allows her to teleport within a certain distance.
Tsunekichi Hatadaira (葉多平 ツネキチ, Hatadaira Tsunekichi)
Voiced by: Atsushi Tamaru
A laid-back and perverted student who can project his prophetic visions while he is sleeping via a normal camera.
Yuka Sasaki (佐々木 ユウカ, Sasaki Yūka)
Voiced by: Miyu Tomita (Japanese); Rachelle Heger (English)
A friendly and tomboyish girl who claims to have the talent of super strength. She and Shinji are inseparable childhood friends who appear to be dating.
Shinji Kazama (風間 シンジ, Kazama Shinji)
Voiced by: Aiko Ninomiya (Japanese); Kai Jordan (English)
A pale and brusque boy who has the talent of necromancy. He and Yuka are inseparable childhood friends who appear to be dating.
Ryuji Ishii (石井 リュウジ, Ishii Ryūji)
Voiced by: Tomohiro Ōno
A good-natured and popular student who is Fuko's boyfriend.
Fuko Sorano (空野 フウコ, Sorano Fūko)
Voiced by: Yuna Kamakura
A mild-mannered girl who is Ryuji's girlfriend. She has the talent to manipulate air currents and control air pressure, including using wind as razor-sharp blades, but can only do so in a well-ventilated area.
Homeroom teacher (担任教師, Tannin Kyōshi)
Voiced by: Atsushi Kousaka (Japanese); Marc Swint (English)
He is the homeroom teacher of the students. Despite being a teacher, he is virtually clueless of the government's actions.
Jin Tachibana (橘 ジン, Tachibana Jin)
Voiced by: Kōji Yusa (Japanese); Jonah Scott (English)
A powerful Talented who is a former student at the island. His talent allows him to transform into any living creature and even use their talents, provided his transformation is not seen by other people.

== Media ==
=== Manga ===
Written by Looseboy and illustrated by Iori Furuya, Talentless Nana was serialized in Square Enix's shōnen manga magazine Monthly Shōnen Gangan from May 12, 2016, to July 10, 2026. Square Enix collected its chapters in fifteen tankōbon volumes, which were released from February 22, 2017, to September 11, 2026.

Crunchyroll digitally published the series in North America until December 11, 2023. It was then subsequently picked up by Square Enix's Manga Up! service.

==== Volumes ====
| No. | Japanese release date | Japanese ISBN |
|---|---|---|
| 1 | February 22, 2017 | 978-4-7575-5153-4 |
1. "Talentless" (無能力, Munōryoku); 2. "Back in Time" (時間遡行, Jikan Sokō); 3. "Talented vs. Talentless Part 1" (能力者VS. 無能力者 PART1, Nōryoku-sha Bāsasu Munōryoku-sha Pāto 1); 4. "Talented vs. Talentless Part 2" (能力者VS. 無能力者 PART2, Nōryoku-sha Bāsasu Munōryoku-sha Pāto 2)
| 2 | May 22, 2017 | 978-4-7575-5345-3 |
5. "Healing" (ヒーリング, Hīringu); 6. "Prophetic Dreams Part 1" (未来予知夢 PART1, Mirai Yochi Yume Pāto 1); 7. "Prophetic Dreams Part 2" (未来予知夢 PART2, Mirai Yochi Yume Pāto 2); 8. "Prophetic Dreams Part 3" (未来予知夢 PART3, Mirai Yochi Yume Pāto 3); 9. "Talented vs. Talentless Part 3" (能力者VS. 無能力者 PART3, Nōryoku-sha Bāsasu Munōryoku-sha Pāto 3); 10. "Necromancer Part 1" (ネクロマンサー PART1, Nekuromansā Pāto 1); 11. "Necromancer Part 2" (ネクロマンサー PART2, Nekuromansā Pāto 2)
| 3 | January 22, 2018 | 978-4-7575-5586-0 |
12. "Necromancer Part 3" (ネクロマンサー PART3, Nekuromansā Pāto 3); 13. "Necromancer Part 4" (ネクロマンサー PART4, Nekuromansā Pāto 4); 14. "Necromancer Part 5" (ネクロマンサー PART5, Nekuromansā Pāto 5); 15. "Talented vs. Talentless Part 4" (能力者VS. 無能力者 PART4, Nōryoku-sha Bāsasu Munōryoku-sha Pāto 4); 16. "Talented vs. Talentless Part 5" (能力者VS. 無能力者 PART5, Nōryoku-sha Bāsasu Munōryoku-sha Pāto 5); 17. "Talented vs. Talentless Part 6" (能力者VS. 無能力者 PART6, Nōryoku-sha Bāsasu Munōryoku-sha Pāto 6); 18. "Survival of the Fittest Part 1" (適者生存 PART1, Tekisha Seizon Pāto 1); 19. "Survival of the Fittest Part 2" (適者生存 PART2, Tekisha Seizon Pāto 2)
| 4 | October 22, 2018 | 978-4-7575-5873-1 |
20. "Survival of the Fittest Part 3" (適者生存 PART3, Tekisha Seizon Pāto 3); 21. "Invisible Blade Part 1" (見えざる刃 PART1, Miezaru Yaiba Pāto 1); 22. "Invisible Blade Part 2" (見えざる刃 PART2, Miezaru Yaiba Pāto 2); 23. "Invisible Blade Part 3" (見えざる刃 PART3, Miezaru Yaiba Pāto 3); 24. "Invisible Blade Part 4" (見えざる刃 PART4, Miezaru Yaiba Pāto 4); 25. "Invisible Blade Part 5" (見えざる刃 PART5, Miezaru Yaiba Pāto 5); 26. "Invisible Blade Part 6" (見えざる刃 PART6, Miezaru Yaiba Pāto 6); 27. "Invisible Blade Part 7" (見えざる刃 PART7, Miezaru Yaiba Pāto 7); 28. "Revival" (リバイバル, Ribaibaru)
| 5 | July 12, 2019 | 978-4-7575-6193-9 |
29. "Invisible Blade Part 8" (見えざる刃 PART8, Miezaru Yaiba Pāto 8); 30. "Invisible Blade Part 9" (見えざる刃 PART9, Miezaru Yaiba Pāto 9); 31. "Mind Control" (マインドコントロール, Maindokontorōru); 32. "Mind Control vs. Survival of the Fittest" (マインドコントロールVS.適者の生存, Maindokontorōru Bāsasu Tekisha Seizon); 33. "Survival of the Fittest Part 4" (適者生存 PART4, Tekisha Seizon Pāto 4); 34. "Gravity Control Part 1" (重力操作 PART1, Jūryoku Sōsa Pāto 1); 35. "Gravity Control Part 2" (重力操作 PART2, Jūryoku Sōsa Pāto 2); 36. "Gravity Control Part 3" (重力操作 PART3, Jūryoku Sōsa Pāto 3); 37. "Gravity Control Part 4" (重力操作 PART4, Jūryoku Sōsa Pāto 4)
| 6 | April 11, 2020 | 978-4-7575-6588-3 |
38. "Pursuer and Pursued" (追う者、追われる者, Ou Mono Owa Reru Mono); 39. "Twin Trick Part 1" (双子のトリック PART 1, Futago no Torikku Pāto 1); 40. "Twin Trick Part 2" (双子のトリック PART 2, Futago no Torikku Pāto 2); 41. "Twin Trick Part 3" (双子のトリック PART 3, Futago no Torikku Pāto 3); 42. "Twin Trick Part 4" (双子のトリック PART 4, Futago no Torikku Pāto 4); 43. "Twin Trick Part 5" (双子のトリック PART 5, Futago no Torikku Pāto 5); 44. "Twin Trick Part 6" (双子のトリック PART 6, Futago no Torikku Pāto 6); 45. "Twin Trick Part 7" (双子のトリック PART 7, Futago no Torikku Pāto 7); 46. "Illusion" (幻, Maboroshi)
| 7 | October 12, 2020 | 978-4-7575-6894-5 |
47. "Truth" (真実, Shinjitsu); 48. "Talentless Part 2" (無能力 PART 2, Munōryoku Pāto 2); 49. "Enemies of Humanity Part 1" ("人類の敵" PART 1, Jinrui no Teki Pāto 1); 50. "Enemies of Humanity Part 2" ("人類の敵" PART 2, Jinrui no Teki Pāto 2); 51. "Enemies of Humanity Part 3" ("人類の敵" PART 3, Jinrui no Teki Pāto 3); 52. "Enemies of Humanity Part 4" ("人類の敵" PART 4, Jinrui no Teki Pāto 4)
| 8 | June 11, 2021 | 978-4-7575-7315-4 |
53. "Talentless Part 3" (無能力 PART3, Munōryoku Pāto 3); 54. "Confession" (告白, Kokuhaku); 55. "Moe Part 1" (モエ PART1, Moe Pāto 1); 56. "Moe Part 2" (モエ PART2, Moe Pāto 2); 57. "Moe Part 3" (モエ PART3, Moe Pāto 3); 58. "Moe Part 4" (モエ PART4, Moe Pāto 4); 59. "Moe Part 5" (モエ PART5, Moe Pāto 5); 60. "Moe Part 6" (モエ PART6, Moe Pāto 6)
| 9 | February 12, 2022 | 978-4-7575-7738-1 |
61. "Moe Part 7" (モエ PART7, Moe Pāto 7); 62. "Moe Part 8" (モエ PART8, Moe Pāto 8); 63. "Moe Part 9" (モエ PART9, Moe Pāto 9); 64. "Moe Part 10" (モエ PART10, Moe Pāto 10); 65. "Moe Part 11" (モエ PART11, Moe Pāto 11); 66. "Moe Part 12" (モエ PART12, Moe Pāto 12); 67. "Beginning of the Revolution" (革命のはじまり, Kakumei no Hajimari); 68. "Revolution Followed by Smiles" (革命、そして笑顔, Kakumei, Soshite Egao)
| 10 | October 12, 2022 | 978-4-7575-8196-8 |
69. "Managed Camp" (管理キャンプ, Kanri Kyanpu); 70. "Reunion" (再会, Saikai); 71. "The Price of Immortality" (不老不死、その代償, Furōfushi, Sono Daishō); 72. "Time Travel Part 1" (タイムリープ PART1, Taimurīpu Pāto 1); 73. "Time Travel Part 2" (タイムリープ PART2, Taimurīpu Pāto 2); 74. "Time Travel Part 3" (タイムリープ PART3, Taimurīpu Pāto 3); 75. "Time Travel Part 4" (タイムリープ PART4, Taimurīpu Pāto 4); 76. "Onodera Rin" (小野寺リン)
| 11 | July 12, 2023 | 978-4-7575-8658-1 |
77. "Siblings Part 1" (兄妹 PART1, Kyōdai Pāto 1); 78. "Siblings Part 2" (兄妹 PART2, Kyōdai Pāto 2); 79. "Fidget" (手癖, Teguse); 80. "Hope" (希望, Kibō); 81. "Shadow" (シャドウ, Shadō); 82. "Proof of Innocence Part 1" (無実の証明 PART1, Mujitsu no Shōmei Pāto 1); 83. "Proof of Innocence Part 2" (無実の証明 PART2, Mujitsu no Shōmei Pāto 2); 84. "Proof of Innocence Part 3" (無実の証明 PART3, Mujitsu no Shōmei Pāto 3); 85. "Monster" (怪物, Kaibutsu)
| 12 | April 12, 2024 | 978-4-7575-9148-6 |
86. "Talentless and Incapable" (無能力者と無能力, Munōryoku-sha to Munōryoku); 87. "Talentless vs. Nullifcation Part 1" (無能力者VS.無能力 PART1, Munōryoku-sha Bāsasu Munōryoku Pāto 1); 88. "Talentless vs. Nullifcation Part 2" (無能力者VS.無能力 PART2, Munōryoku-sha Bāsasu Munōryoku Pāto 2); 89. "Nana and the Talented" (ナナと能力者たち, Nana to Nōryoku-sha-tachi); 90. "You're Not Alone" (一人じゃない, Hitorijanai); 91. "The Conclusion of Nullification" (無能力、決着, Munōryoku, Ketchaku); 92. "Reconciliation" (和解, Wakai); 93. "Confrontation" (対面, Taimen); 94. "Survival of the Fittest Part 5" (適者生存 PART5, Tekisha Seizon Pāto 5)
| 13 | February 12, 2025 | 978-4-7575-9670-2 |
95. "Survival of the Fittest Part 6" (適者生存 PART6, Tekisha Seizon Pāto 6); 96. "Survival of the Fittest Part 7" (適者生存 PART7, Tekisha Seizon Pāto 7); 97. "Someone" (誰か, Dareka); 98. "Comeback" (再起, Saiki); 99. "Hostage Negotiations" (人質交渉, Hitojichi Kōshō); 100. "Telepathy Part 1" (テレパシー PART1, Terepashī Pāto 1); 101. "Telepathy Part 2" (テレパシー PART2, Terepashī Pāto 2); 102. "Planning the Jailbreak" (脱獄計画, Datsugoku Keikaku)
| 14 | December 11, 2025 | 978-4-301-00218-5 |
103. "Persuasion Part 1" (説得 PART1, Settoku Pāto 1); 104. "Persuasion Part 2" (説得 PART2, Settoku Pāto 2); 105. "Partner" (相棒, Aibō); 106. "Talentless vs. Talentless Part 1" (無能力者VS.無能力者 PART1, Munōryoku-sha Bāsasu Munōryoku-sha Pāto 1); 107. "Talentless vs. Talentless Part 2" (無能力者VS.無能力者 PART2, Munōryoku-sha Bāsasu Munōryoku-sha Pāto 2); 108. "Talentless vs. Talentless Part 3" (無能力者VS.無能力者 PART3, Munōryoku-sha Bāsasu Munōryoku-sha Pāto 3); 109. "Rescue" (救出, Kyūshutsu); 110. "Fully Prepared" (準備万端, Junbimantan); 111. "Commence" (決行, Kekkō); 112. "Talentless vs. Talentless?" (無能力者VS.無能力者？, Munōryoku-sha Bāsasu Munōryoku-sha?); 113. "Final Time Loop" (ラスト・タイムリープ, Rasuto Taimurīpu)
| 15 | September 11, 2026 | 978-4-301-00755-5 |
114. "Mind Reading Part 1" (読心術 PART1, Dokushinjutsu Pāto 1); 115. "Mind Reading Part 2" (読心術 PART2, Dokushinjutsu Pāto 2); 116. "Mind Reading Part 3" (読心術 PART3, Dokushinjutsu Pāto 3); 117. "Mind Reading Part 4" (読心術 PART4, Dokushinjutsu Pāto 4); 118. "Mind Reading Part 5" (読心術 PART5, Dokushinjutsu Pāto 5); 119. "Mind Reading Part 6" (読心術 PART6, Dokushinjutsu Pāto 6); 120. "Mind Reading Part 7 (読心術 PART7, Dokushinjutsu Pāto 7); 121. "Companions" (仲間たち, Nakama-tachi); 122. "What the Talentless Accomplished" (無能力者にできたこと, Munōryokusha ni Dekita Koto)

=== Anime ===
An anime television series adaptation was announced on April 7, 2020. The series was animated by Bridge and directed by Shinji Ishihira, with Fumihiko Shimo handling series composition, Satohiko Sano designing the characters, and Yasuharu Takanashi composing the music at Nippon Columbia. The opening theme, "Broken Sky", is performed by Miyu Tomita, while the ending theme, "Bakemono to Yobarete" (バケモノと呼ばれて; "Known as a Monster"), is performed by Chiai Fujikawa. The series aired from October 4 to December 27, 2020, on AT-X, Tokyo MX, SUN, and TVA. Muse Communication licensed the anime and they streamed it in Southeast Asia and South Asia.

Funimation acquired the series and streamed it on its website in North America and the British Isles. On November 20, 2021, Funimation announced the series would receive an English dub, which premiered the following day. The series was moved to Crunchyroll following Sony's consolidation of Funimation titles into the service.

==== Episodes ====
| No. | Title (Note: English translated titles are taken from Crunchyroll.) | Directed by | Written by | Original release date |
|---|---|---|---|---|
| 1 | "Talentless"; Transliteration: "Munōryoku" (Japanese: 無能力) | Yūshi Suzuki | Fumihiko Shimo | October 4, 2020 |
Talentless student Nanao Nakajima deals with bullies in his class when two new students arrive: a terse boy named Kyoya Onodera, and an upbeat girl named Nana Hiiragi with the talent of reading minds. Nana tries to become friendly with Nanao, and even pushes him to run for Class President. Nana continues following Nanao around campus sharing information about her mind-reading talent. The next day, Moguo Iijima and Seiya Kori spar over the Class President position. Seiya wins, but Moguo throws a giant fireball in anger. Nanao leaps into action to save Nana from the fireball, and reveals his talent: the power to cancel other talents. Afterward, having won Class President himself, Nana offers to let him test his power on her by holding her hand. As he does, Nana throws him off the cliff. While he hangs by a rope, Nana reveals to Nanao that she is actually Talentless, and that she is killing him before he leads the other Talented to become the true Enemies of Humanity. As Nanao loses his grip and falls away, Nana receives a text message claiming she has saved one million people from dying from a future enemy commander.
| 2 | "Time Traveler"; Transliteration: "Jikan Sokō" (Japanese: 時間遡行) | Tomoya Takayama | Shōji Yonemura | October 11, 2020 |
A government committee reflects on Talented people upending the normal order of human society. The government tried to counter this threat with units of Talented individuals under their military's command, but those Talented soon turned on their masters as well. Talentless humans eventually managed to restore order, but at a heavy cost. In the present, the class notices Nanao's disappearance while Seiya freezes an entire lake. While Nana tries to gain more information on Seiya's talent, she finds another classmate, Yohei Shibusawa, breaking up a fight with Moguo using a time travel talent. At lunch, she finds out more about Yohei's talent: that he can only travel backwards in time to a certain extent. Suddenly, the two are interrupted by a suspicious Kyoya, as Nana tries to avoid implicating herself. Later, Nana gets Yohei to demonstrate the limits of his talent, and her past self spots Yōhei before she carries out her assassination of Nanao. Late at night, Nana lures Yohei to a spot where she claimed to see Nanao being eaten by an Enemy of Humanity. As he travels back about 24 hours in time, Yohei ends up trapped in the river that Seiya froze previously that morning.
| 3 | "Talented vs. Talentless"; Transliteration: "Nōryoku-sha Bāsasu Munōryoku-sha" (Japanese: 能力者VS. 無能力者) | Hiroshi Akiyama | Fumihiko Shimo | October 18, 2020 |
Kyoya investigates the cliff where Nanao was last seen. Meanwhile, in the classroom, Nana, Moguo, and Seiya are having a conversation when Kyōya shows up. During lunchtime, Nana follows Kyoya to the janitor's shed where she finds out that he feeds a cat. Afterward, they meet up in the hallway and he invites her to his room. There, he reveals that he came to the island because his younger sister is missing. He also reveals that he found Nanao's watch during his investigation. He then takes her to the cliff to warn her about what is going on. That night, Nana reminisces about the things she noticed in Kyoya's room and decides to set up a trap. The next day, while they are alone, Nana mentions the cat. Later, when Kyoya attempts to feed the cat, the janitor's shed explodes. Nana reveals that she saturated it with gas based on her observation that Kyoya could not smell. When Nana tries to leave, Kyoya reveals that he survived thanks to his immortality.
| 4 | "Healing"; Transliteration: "Hīringu" (Japanese: ヒーリング) | Shin'ichi Fukumoto | Fumihiko Shimo | October 25, 2020 |
In the classroom, Kyoya discusses what happened to him in the janitor's shed. Meanwhile, Kirara Habu and Kaori Takanashi announce to the class that Michiru Inukai has received a love letter. Michiru then notices a scrape on Nana's leg and she uses her talent to heal her. After school, Michiru is waiting outside for her secret admirer when Nana shows up, revealing that the love letter was a prank by Kirara and Kaori. Later that night, Nana attempts to leave when she realizes that Kyoya is guarding her door. Sneaking out, she heads to Michiru's room where she stabs herself in order to throw off Kyoya's suspicion. The next day, Nana successfully fabricates a story about being attacked. As such, she is appointed the leader of the class. Later, Nana asks Michiru to gather information about everyone's talents. When Nana heads to the dormitory, she is approached by Tsunekichi Hatadaira, who reveals that he can see the future. He then shows Nana a photo of her attacking him. In the cafeteria, Nana discovers that Tsunekichi indeed has the ability to see in the future.
| 5 | "Talented vs. Talentless Part 2"; Transliteration: "Nōryoku-sha Bāsasu Munōryoku-sha Pāto Tsū" (Japanese: 能力者VS. 無能力者 PART2) | Naoto Hashimoto | Fumihiko Shimo | November 1, 2020 |
Tsunekichi decides to blackmail Nana by using the photos he took. When he falls asleep, Nana learns that Tsunekichi gets his prophetic visions via a normal camera. The next morning, Tsunekichi confiscates one of his photos Nana has in her possession. While Tsunekichi is away, Nana tampers his watch. Later that night in the P.E. shed, Nana is thwarted when she attempts to kill Tsunekichi. Just as he is about to assault her, Nana reveals that she poisoned him and the photo he previously confiscated was actually taken by her. Once Tsunekichi succumbs to the poison, the real prophetic vision occurs when Kyoya and Michiru arrive at the scene. Kyoya explains that they came to the shed after they checked Tsunekichi's room. When Kyoya shows her the fake photo, Nana takes advantage of this by claiming that Tsunekichi took nude photos of her. She then leaves to retrieve the rest of the photos while Michiru stays behind with Tsunekichi's body. Following a confrontation with Kyoya, Nana realizes that one of the photos is missing. In the shed, Michiru comes across the photo just as Nana shows back up.
| 6 | "Necromancer"; Transliteration: "Nekuromansā" (Japanese: ネクロマンサー) | Yūshi Suzuki | Shōji Yonemura | November 8, 2020 |
When Michiru hands Nana the photo, Nana convinces Michiru that Tsunekichi was not as clairvoyant as he claimed. Afterward, Michiru reveals that she tried to resurrect Tsunekichi. At Tsunekichi's funeral, Kyoya requests that an autopsy be performed. However, Nana takes him outside where they have a conversation. When they return to the funeral, Shinji Kazama uses his necromancy to control Tsunekichi. The next day, Nana approaches Yuka Sasaki about Shinji. Later, Yuka explains to Nana and Kyōya that she rescued Shinji five years prior using her super strength. In the infirmary, Nana pretends that she is tired so she can sneak out and kill Shinji. After she poisons him, Nana rushes back when she notices the cat is stuck in a drain. She then gets Kyoya, Michiru, and Yuka to help her. However, Yuka claims that she is allergic. That night, Nana attempts to kill Yuka when she is stopped by Shinji. Nana then realizes that Yuka is actually the necromancer. After Yuka reveals how Shinji died, Nana admits that while she is a murderer, she lets the dead rest in peace.
| 7 | "Necromancer Part 2"; Transliteration: "Nekuromansā Pāto Tsū" (Japanese: ネクロマンサー PART2) | Tomoya Takayama | Fumihiko Shimo | November 15, 2020 |
Nana taunts Yuka about her relationship with Shinji. She then offers a proposal: she will tell Yuka what Shinji is thinking. She claims that he wants her dead before she runs off. While she is alone, Nana brings up the things she observed in Yuka's room. Heading further into the mountains, Nana encounters some zombies. When she reaches an abandoned cottage, it is revealed that Yuka cannot use her talent during the day. As such, Yuka decides to lock Nana inside. Later that night, Yuka returns to the cottage only to discover that she cannot find Nana. The next morning, Yuka heads to the dormitory with Shinji when she is confronted by Nana. When they arrive at the cliff, Nana reveals how she tricked Yika. She then asks Yuka about her relationship with Shinji. After hearing it, Nana points out the inconsistencies. This leads to Yuka revealing that she caused Shinji's death because she was jealous that he was dating another girl. Nana then kills her.
| 8 | "Talented vs. Talentless Part 3"; Transliteration: "Nōryoku-sha Bāsasu Munōryoku-sha Pāto Surī" (Japanese: 能力者VS. 無能力者 PART3) | Naoto Hashimoto | Shōji Yonemura | November 22, 2020 |
After disposing Yuka's body, Nana comes across Kirara, who explains that she had a fight with Kaori. Nana then poisons Kirara and forces her to give up her phone's password. Afterward, she heads to Kaori's room to tamper with her contact case. In the hallway, Nana tells Kyoya that Yuka is dead. When Nana, Kyoya, Michiru, Seiya, and Moguo arrive the cliff, Nana claims Yuka committed suicide after she managed to get through to her. After she convinces Moguo to burn the corpses, including Shinji and Kirara's, Kyoya becomes suspicious of Nana until they discover Kaori's body. Kyoya then learns that Kaori had been poisoned via her contacts. Later that night, when Nana, Kyoya, and Michiru head back to Kaori's room, Nana realizes that she made a mistake. When Michiru checks Kaori's phone, Kyoya becomes convinced that Nana is the killer. He waits until some of their classmates arrive to explain how Nana killed Kaori. He then checks Nana to see if she still has Kirara's phone.
| 9 | "Survival of the Fittest"; Transliteration: "Tekisha Seizon" (Japanese: 適者生存) | Kazunobu Shimizu | Fumihiko Shimo | November 29, 2020 |
During his search, Kyoya discovers that Nana does not have Kirara's phone, in which she reveals how she got rid of it while giving herself an alibi at the same time. Nana then claims that she can hear Kirara's spirit. Michiru later catches Nana off guard, but Nana is able to subdue her. The next day, Michiru pesters Nana until she accepts her present. While doing so, Nana successfully convinces the class that she read their minds when she correctly points out what a note taped to Michiru's back says. At the cliff, a former student named Jin Tachibana confronts Nana, admitting that he used his talent to transform into Michiru. Taking her to a cave, he reveals they previously encountered each other when he was the cat Kyoya fed. He also reveals that a civil war broke out on the island five years prior. Afterward, Nana appears to have killed Jin when she poisoned his drink. Just as she is about to contact the committee, Nana realizes that Jin can copy any appearances and talents.
| 10 | "The Invisible Blade"; Transliteration: "Miezaru Yaiba" (Japanese: 見えざる刃) | Naoki Murata | Shōji Yonemura | December 6, 2020 |
Nana wonders why Jin has not used his talent to discover the identity of the committee himself. She then tries to escape, but she is injured when Jin transforms into Moguo. Before she passes out, Nana explains her family situation. Afterward, Nana awakens in Michiru's room where she explains to Michiru that she feels responsible for her parents' death. At the funeral for Shinji, Yuka and Kaori, Nana notices the ill effect Michiru's talent has on her. Later, while Nana is in her room, Jin shows up. Shortly thereafter, Michiru shows up as well and Jin transforms into the cat. When Michiru inquires about Nana's childhood, Nana reveals that she was a typical girl who loved games and manga until the night her parents were killed by a burglar when she forgot to lock her window after she snuck out. This causes Michiru to comfort her. The next morning, Kyoya tells Nana to follow him where he shows her another dead body. Nana soon realizes that another murderer is on the loose.
| 11 | "The Invisible Blade Part 2"; Transliteration: "Miezaru Yaiba Pāto Tsū" (Japanese: 見えざる刃 PART2) | Hiroshi Akiyama | Fumihiko Shimo | December 13, 2020 |
Kyoya reveals that the victim was Ryuji Ishii. When asked where he was, Moguo states that he was giving his henchmen a pep talk. The henchmen then reveal their talents. Later, Ryuji's girlfriend, Fuko Sorano, demonstrates her talent on Kyoya outside. Shortly thereafter, the homeroom teacher arrives to announce that the higher-ups are on the phone thanks to Kyoya. Nana and Michiru are investigating the crime scene when Nana notices something is off with Michiru. When they later hang out in the cafeteria, Nana becomes emotional after Michiru asks her to move in with her and her parents after graduation. While in her room, Nana receives a new uniform. She then realizes that the poison bottle is missing. When Kyoya shows up, their teacher reveals that someone from headquarters will be coming. After Kyoya questions her whereabouts, Fuko tearfully asks Nana to help her avenge Ryuji's death. Nana later heads to Michiru's room where she comes across Michiru's diary. Following a conversation with Jin, Nana walks into the bathroom where she finds Michiru unconscious in the bathtub.
| 12 | "The Invisible Blade Part 3"; Transliteration: "Miezaru Yaiba Pāto Surī" (Japanese: 見えざる刃 PART3) | Tomoya Takayama | Shōji Yonemura | December 20, 2020 |
After thinking about it, Nana decides to save Michiru. When Nana approaches her teacher, he suggests that she asks Kyoya for help, which she does. Later, Kyoya shows up while Nana is tending to Michiru. That night, Nana is still tending to Michiru when Fuko arrives, wondering if there has been any further developments in the case. When Michiru finally wakes up, Nana and Michiru hang out together. The next day, Jin has a conversation with Ryuji's killer. He then wonders who is responsible for manipulating Nana. Meanwhile, Tsuruoka, Nana's mentor, tells the committee that he is heading to the island. While Kyoya continues to investigate, Nana and Michiru are playing shogi. During the game, Michiru reveals she was bullied due to her talent until one day she healed a dog. As such, she became friends with Hitomi Hosokawa, the dog's owner. However, while she was helping at a hospital, Michiru fainted. She then learned that Hitomi had cancer. Shortly thereafter, Hitomi passed away. Nana becomes emotional once she is alone.
| 13 | "Revival"; Transliteration: "Ribaibaru" (Japanese: リバイバル) | Yūshi Suzuki | Fumihiko Shimo | December 27, 2020 |
Nana and Michiru have a discussion regarding the murder of Nana's parents, in which Michiru states that Nana could not have been responsible in any way. The two share a hug with Nana mentally celebrating making a friend. The next day, they buy each other gifts. Later that night, Kyoya finally determines the killer's identity. Meanwhile, Jin visits Nana and informs her that Michiru is about to become the next victim. When Nana heads out, she receives a phone call from Tsuruoka. Later, just as the killer is about to strike, Nana arrives and is stabbed in the back. She then reveals that the killer is Rentaro Tsurumigawa, the henchman with the astral projection talent. While Rentaro continues his assault, Nana tells him that she has laid a trap. She then proceeds to insult Michiru in order to ensure that she flees to safety. When Rentaro wonders what the trap is, Kyoya finds his real body and stops him. As Nana lies on the ground dying, Michiru returns and uses her talent to save Nana. Afterward, a distraught Nana holds Michiru's body, crying in pain as she has lost her one and only true friend.
