= Seven Mortal Sins =

Multimedia project anime series produced by Artland and TNK

- Key visual

sin 七つの大罪 (Sin: Nanatsu no Taizai)
- Genre: Supernatural
- Created by: Hobby Japan
- Manga
- Illustrated by: Ururihi
- Published by: Hobby Japan
- Magazine: Comic Fire
- Original run: August 29, 2016 – March 24, 2017
- Volumes: 1
- Manga

The Seven Heavenly Virtues
- Illustrated by: Zunta
- Published by: Media Factory
- Magazine: Monthly Comic Alive
- Original run: December 1, 2017 – March 31, 2018
- Anime television series
- Directed by: Kinji Yoshimoto
- Produced by: Kazuaki Takahashi; Masaaki Yokota; Noritomo Isogai; Takuya Inoue; Takao Asaga
- Written by: Masashi Suzuki
- Music by: Masaru Yokoyama; Hiroaki Tsutsumi
- Studio: Artland; TNK
- Licensed by: Crunchyroll (Note: In North America through Crunchyroll (formerly known as Funimation) and in Australia through Madman Anime.): UK: MVM Films
- Original network: AT-X, Tokyo MX, BS11
- Original run: April 14, 2017 – July 29, 2017
- Episodes: 12 + 19 ONA
- Anime television series

The Seven Heavenly Virtues
- Directed by: Shinji Ishihira
- Produced by: Masaaki Yokota
- Written by: Shinji Ishihira
- Studio: Bridge
- Licensed by: NA: Sentai Filmworks
- Original network: AT-X
- Original run: January 26, 2018 – March 30, 2018
- Episodes: 10 + 2 OVA

Seven Mortal Sins, also known as Sin: The 7 Deadly Sins (sin 七つの大罪, Sin: Nanatsu no Taizai), is a Japanese anime television series animated by Artland and TNK that aired from April 14, 2017, to July 29, 2017. It is an adaptation of Hobby Japan's media franchise The 7 Deadly Sins (七つの大罪, Nanatsu no Taizai), which primarily consists of a series of fantasy figures.

This was later followed by the short anime The Seven Heavenly Virtues, also known as Seven Heavenly Virtues (七つの美徳, Nanatsu no Bitoku), which was animated by Bridge and aired from January 26 to March 30, 2018. As with the previous series, this is an adaptation of a related media franchise by Hobby Japan.

== Plot ==
Lucifer, one of God's archangels, is denounced for rebelling against the Almighty's will and cast out of Heaven. She is forced into a brief stopover by crashing into a high school's church, where a young girl, Maria Totsuka, witnesses her arrival. After Lucifer has infused the girl with a part of her angel's blood, she continues her fall into the depths of Hell, where she is met by Leviathan, the aspiring minor Demon Lord of Envy.

Soon after, Lucifer is challenged by the Seven Sins, the ruling Demon Lords of Hell, led by Belial. Bundling their powers, the Seven Sins overcome Lucifer and seal away her angelic powers by fitting her with a cursed Garb of Punishment, thereby turning her into a Demon Lord. Swearing revenge on her defeaters, Lucifer returns with Leviathan to Earth, where she turns Maria into her immortal slave. With her two sidekicks in tow, Lucifer sets out to defeat the Seven Sins one at a time in order to sunder their powers imbuing her Garb.

== Characters ==
=== Main characters ===
Lucifer (ルシファー, Rushifā) / Pride (傲慢, Gōman)
Voiced by: Eri Kitamura (Japanese); Nicole Endicott (English)
Formerly the first of the Archangels of Heaven and the former leader of the Seven Heavenly Virtues, she was denounced and cast out of Heaven for her rebellion against the will of God, who seeks the destruction of both mankind and Hell for their inherent (but inevitable) corruption. After battling the Seven Mortal Sins for the first time, she is cursed by Belial with the Garb of Punishment, a barbed tattoo-like body-chain empowered by the Seven Sins which inhibits her angelic powers and torments her with constant pain and blood-letting. But while Lucifer's immense pride was the cause for her fall from Heaven, it also proves to be her strongest weapon against both the predations of the Seven Sins and the power of God.
Maria Totsuka (十束 真莉亜, Totsuka Maria)
Voiced by: Megumi Toda (Japanese); Madeleine Morris (English)
A shy, soft-spoken teenage human girl who has worshipped Lucifer all her life when she was still an angel. She initially encounters Lucifer during a brief stopover in the middle of her descent to Hell. Maria becomes Lucifer's servant when Lucifer rips out her heart, granting her immortality and eternal youth; and though initially unwilling, Maria becomes gradually quite taken with her new mistress. In the final episode, it is revealed that Lucifer has been aware of Maria's dedication to her, which is the primary reason why Lucifer rebelled against God's decision to destroy humanity and why they were destined to meet in the first place.
Leviathan (レヴィアタン, Reviatan) / Envy (嫉妬, Shitto)
Voiced by: Akane Fujita (Japanese); Brittany Lauda (English)
The aspiring Demon Lord of Envy, she becomes instantly infatuated with Lucifer upon the latter's arrival in Hell and makes herself into the fallen angel's sidekick. She is therefore continuously jealous of Maria because she receives the better part of Lucifer's attention, though the two are quite capable of working together if it serves Lucifer's interests. She has the ability to control water and water creatures.

=== Supporting characters ===
Belial (ベリアル, Beriaru) / Vanity (虚飾, Kyoshoku)
Voiced by: Shizuka Itō (Japanese); Elizabeth Maxwell (English)
The Demon Lord of Vanity, and the ruler of the Seven Mortal Sins until Lucifer's arrival. Her most distinguishing feature are her heterochromatic eyes, of which the left one is ruby red while the right one sports a golden iris. She was once part of the Byrndale family, a once prestigious clan, which Belial wished to return to its former glory, and also an angel herself under the name Satanael (ザタナエル, Zatanaeru) before she attempted to gather more followers for God by appearing before the humans and thereby proving God's existence to them. However, her presumptuous attempt backfired when the humans instead allowed themselves to fall to the Seven Sins, and for this blunder she was sentenced and banished to Hell. Ultimately, she attempts to betray Hell and her subordinate Sins in order to be reinstated as an angel.
Satan (サタン, Satan) / Wrath (憤怒, Funnu)
Voiced by: Arisa Sakuraba (Japanese); Dawn M. Bennett (English)
Representing Wrath, Satan is a fiery, red-headed Demon Lord whose main task is to judge the souls of the dead at the threshold of the Gates to Hell, and sentence the deserving to eternal damnation. While she has a hair-trigger temper, she also has a sense of honor and a love for cute and innocent things; for this reason she is especially fond of Beelzebub. She uses an ax in combat and has armies from all over the world serving as her followers.
Belphegor (ベルフェゴール, Berufegōru) / Sloth (怠惰, Taida)
Voiced by: Ai Kakuma (Japanese); Ella Davis (English)
As the representation of Sloth, Belphegor is the laziest and most easy-going of the Mortal Sins, sporting cat-like features like white hair and a claw-equipped tail (which she often uses as a third hand since she's usually too lazy to move her arms), as well as two tiger-striped antelope-type horns. Her favorite hobbies are surfing, engaging in games inside the Internet and exchanging messages with Astaroth, with whom she is good friends because of their very similar moods. She uses a morning star when engaging in hand-to-hand combat, and gains followers by running a popular MMORPG.
Mammon (マモン, Mamon) / Greed (強欲, Gōyoku)
Voiced by: Yoko Hikasa (Japanese); Annabel Thorne (English)
The Demon Lord of Greed who attempts to employ every opportunity to make a winning, specializing in real estates and the sale of home-brewed magical potions. Her greed is partially founded by the actions of her unnamed husband, who saddled her with 500,000 children and a load of debts on her shoulders. Mammon's weapons of choice are bottles of dangerous chemicals. Her base of operations is in London.
Beelzebub (ベルゼバブ, Beruzebabu) / Gluttony (暴食, Bōshoku)
Voiced by: Yui Ogura (Japanese); Arielle O'Neil (English)
Despite her slight figure, she is the most voracious of the Seven Sins, as well as perhaps the friendliest of them. She is physically distinguished by one single horn, similar to an alicorn, growing from the center of her forehead. Her motive for becoming a glutton was not out of pure self-indulgence, but to find a way of achieving happiness through eating and sharing that discovery with others. She attracts followers by sponsoring large feasts for the most hedonistic eaters. Her base of operations is in Paris.
Asmodeus (アスモデウス, Asumodeusu) / Lust (色欲, Shikiyoku)
Voiced by: Chiaki Takahashi (Japanese); Morgan Garrett (English)
As the representative of Lust, she is the most lecherous of the Seven Sins. She takes up residence in Miami and works around the clock to attract followers, hosting orgies at the beach during the day and pole dancing for her nightclub attendees at night. Owing to her lascivious nature, she is equally attracted to both women and men.
Astaroth (アスタロト, Asutorato) / Melancholy (憂鬱, Yūutsu)
Voiced by: Azusa Tadokoro (Japanese); Jad Saxton (English)
The Demon King of Melancholy, who spends most of her time as a very popular musician in Earth's virtual world. Though quite the braggart under this pretense, she is very sociophobic and tends to easily lose her nerve, and therefore uses her music to communicate her emotions.
Mina (美菜, Mina)
Voiced by: Miyu Tomita (Japanese); Caitlin Glass (English)
Maria's playful, flirtatious schoolmate and best friend. She does not share Maria's talent and therefore does not believe in the existence of angels and demons.
Behemoth (ベヘモフ, Bememofu)
Leviathan's sidekick monster, who appears (and commonly disguises itself) as a stuffed toy with bat wings and a gas mask.

=== The Seven Heavenly Virtues ===
Michael (ミカエル, Mikaeru) / Faith (忠義, Chūgi)
Voiced by: Yumi Uchiyama (Japanese); Kristin Sutton (Sins), Kucky Long (Virtues) (English)
The Archangel responsible for denouncing Lucifer before God and then casting her to Hell, and therefore the new leader of the Seven Heavenly Virtues. She struck a deal with Belial, demanding the release of all souls tormented in Hell in exchange for delivering Lucifer for eternal torment, but betrays the Demon Lord of Vanity in the end because her unswerving loyalty belongs to God. Despite this, she retains feelings for Lucifer, but ends up becoming her mortal enemy.
In the Seven Heavenly Virtues spin-off, Michael chooses a random human as her candidate human and trains him like a soldier to fight the demons himself. Even so, Michael develops a fondness for her human when he cooks omelettes, her favorite meal, for her.
Uriel (ウリエル, Urieru) / Patience (忍耐, Nintai)
Voiced by: Asami Seto (Japanese); Kira Vincent-Davis (English)
Heaven's intelligence officer. After choosing an office worker as her Messiah candidate, Uriel begins stalking him 24/7, which eventually gets him fired. Then, she decides she has fallen in love with him and moves in with him.
Sariel (サリエル, Sarieru) / Kindness (親切, Shinsetsu)
Voiced by: Sakura Nakamura (Japanese); Avery Smithhart (English)
A mother-type figure who uses every tool in her arsenal - particularly her massive breasts - to comfort others. When comforting her Messiah candidate, her sadistic tendencies emerge. Whenever Sariel sneezes, she inadvertently releases her destructive power and can level several buildings.
Sandalphon (サンダルフォン, Sandarufon) / Diligence (勤勉, Kinben)
Voiced by: Shiori Izawa (Japanese); Rachael Messer (English)
A hard-working inventor and Metatron's sister. Sandalphon chooses a student as her candidate and tries to help him study for a test using her inventions. She is also friends with Belphegor, the Demon Lord that embodies the Sin opposite to Sandalphon's Virtue.
Metatron (メタトロン, Metatoron) / Charity (慈愛, Jiai)
Voiced by: Ari Ozawa (Japanese); Brittney Karbowski (English)
A clumsy nurse and Sandalphon's sister. Metatron chooses a young man in the hospital as her candidate and tries to nurse him back to health. Though timid on the surface, she is more than willing to use her body to service others, but turns into a sexual sadist whenever she touches a needle.
Raphael (ラファエル, Rafaeru) / Temperance (節制, Sessei)
Voiced by: Lynn (Japanese); Courtney Lamelo (English)
A fan of the gyaru culture and sugary foods. Raphael befriends a pastry student and helps him sell his goods in the street. Coming to the conclusion that being the Messiah will prevent the human from achieving his dream of becoming a master pastry chef, Raphael erases the young man's memories of her.
Gabriel (ガブリエル, Gaburieru) / Chastity (貞節, Teisetsu)
Voiced by: Hiyori Nitta (Japanese); Maggie Flecknoe (English)
Head of the Angelic Morals Committee. Gabriel zealously tries to get rid of all immorality, going so far as to yell at random couples in the street. She moves in with her candidate in order keep him from doing anything she deems immoral.

== Media ==
=== Anime ===
An anime television series adaptation was announced in August 2016. The anime was directed by Kinji Yoshimoto at studio Artland and TNK, with scripts written by Masashi Suzuki. Masaru Yokoyama and Hiroaki Tsutsumi produced the series' music. The opening theme "My Sweet Maiden" and ending theme "Welcome to our diabolic paradise" were both sung by Mia Regina. The anime premiered on April 14, 2017, on AT-X with further broadcasts on Tokyo MX & BS11. The series ended on July 29, 2017. The series ran for 12 episodes. Crunchyroll streamed the series. Funimation has licensed the series in North America. Universal Pictures originally announced that they would release the series in the UK, but it was later announced that MVM Entertainment will be distributing the series.

An anime television series adaptation of Hobby Japan's media franchise The Seven Heavenly Virtues that aired from January 26 to March 30, 2018, on AT-X. The series is a spin-off focusing on the titular Heavenly Virtues descending on Earth from the Heavens to search for a suitable candidate to be the new Messiah. It is directed by Shinji Ishihira at Bridge. The opening theme is "Psychomachia" by Yousei Teikoku. The series ran for 10 episodes and has 2 OVAs. Sentai Filmworks have licensed the series and streamed it on "select digital outlets".

=== Game ===
Seven Mortal Sins X-TASY is an official mobile game of the popular anime series Seven Deadly Sins. Players can enjoy the story continuation after the anime, breed their characters and embark on an adventure. Japanese server released on June 2, 2021. An English localized version was released in April 2022.
