= Kanagawa Elves =

Japanese manga series

- First wideban volume cover

#神奈川に住んでるエルフ (Kanagawa ni Sunderu Erufu)
- Genre: Fantasy comedy
- Manga
- Written by: Yoroida
- Published by: Micro Magazine
- Magazine: Comic Elmo
- Original run: August 4, 2020 – present
- Volumes: 6
- Television drama
- Directed by: Oolongta Yoshida
- Written by: Oolongta Yoshida
- Original network: tvk
- Original run: September 30, 2025 – December 16, 2025
- Episodes: 12
- Anime television series
- Directed by: Yūji Umoto
- Music by: Shin Kawamoto
- Studio: Imagica Infos; Imageworks Studio
- Licensed by: Remow
- Original network: tvk
- Original run: December 4, 2025 – March 12, 2026
- Episodes: 12

Kanagawa Elves (Japanese: #神奈川に住んでるエルフ, Hepburn: Kanagawa ni Sunderu Erufu; lit. 'The Elves Living in Kanagawa') is a Japanese manga series written and illustrated by Yoroida. It has been serialized online via the Pixiv Comic website under Micro Magazine's Comic Elmo label since August 2020 and has been collected in five tankōbon volumes. A television drama adaptation aired from September to December 2025, and a "light anime" television series adaptation produced by Imagica Infos and Imageworks Studio aired from December 2025 to March 2026.

== Characters ==
Elf from Yokohama (横浜のエルフ, Yokohama no Erufu)
Voiced by: Chiaki Kobayashi
Portrayed by: Sion Yoshitaka
Human from Kawasaki (川崎の人間, Kawasaki no Ningen)
Voiced by: Yū Hayashi
Portrayed by: Ryōtarō Akazawa
Elf from Yokosuka (横須賀のエルフ, Yokosuka no Erufu)
Voiced by: Yūsuke Nagano
Portrayed by: Teruhisa Takura
Elf from Chigasaki (茅ヶ崎のエルフ, Chigasaki no Erufu)
Voiced by: Jin Ogasawara
Portrayed by: Junya Asada
Elf from Sagamihara (相模原のエルフ, Sagamihara no Erufu)
Voiced by: Yūki Inoue
Portrayed by: Rion Hatakeyama
Orc from Machida (町田のオーク, Machida no Ōku)
Voiced by: Gō Fujii
Portrayed by: Ryuga Akahane
Fairy (妖精さん, Yōsei-san)
Voiced by: Koutaro Nishiyama
Dark Elf from Noge (野毛のダークエルフ, Noge no Dāku Erufu)
Voiced by: Yuko Iida
Dark Elf from Isezakichō (伊勢佐木町のダークエルフ, Isesakichō no Dāku Erufu)
Voiced by: Makoto Kaneko
Elf from Hiratsuka (平塚のエルフ, Hiratsuka no Erufu)
Voiced by: Ryōtarō Akazawa
Elf from Kamakura (鎌倉のエルフ, Kamakura no Erufu)
Voiced by: Kosuke Miyoshi
Elf from Fujisawa (藤沢のエルフ, Fujisawa no Erufu)
Voiced by: Genta Nakamura
Elf from Ebina (海老名のエルフ, Ebina no Erufu)
Voiced by: Yōhei Hamada
Half-Elf from Yokohama Chinatown (横浜中華街のハーフエルフ, Yokohamachūkagai no Hāfu Erufu)
Voiced by: Takuma Nagatsuka
High Elf from Minatomirai (みなとみらいのハイエルフ, Minatomirai no Hai Erufu)
Voiced by: Yūsei Takanaka
Narrator (ナレーション, Narēshon)
Voiced by: Koutaro Nishiyama

== Media ==
=== Manga ===
Written and illustrated by Yoroida, Kanagawa Elves began serialization on the Pixiv Comic website under Micro Magazine's Comic Elmo label on August 4, 2020. Its chapters have been collected into six wideban volumes as of December 2025.

No.	Japanese release date	Japanese ISBN
1	April 9, 2021	978-4-86716-128-9
2	April 11, 2022	978-4-86716-272-9
3	April 10, 2023	978-4-86716-410-5
4	May 10, 2024	978-4-86716-571-3
5	March 10, 2025	978-4-86716-725-0
6	December 10, 2025	978-4-86716-880-6

=== Drama ===
A television drama adaptation was announced on August 26, 2025. The series is directed and written by Oolongta Yoshida and aired from September 30 to December 16, 2025, within the Neko no Hitai Hodo Wide local information program on tvk.

=== Anime ===
A "light anime" television series adaptation was also announced on August 26, 2025. The series is produced by AnimationID, animated by Imagica Infos and Imageworks Studio and directed by Yūji Umoto, with Shin Kawamoto composing the music. It aired from December 4, 2025 to March 12, 2026, within the same program. The ending theme song is "#KanaEruMagic!" performed by The Folie Phantom featuring Masahiro Inoue. Remow licensed the series for streaming on the "It's Anime" free ad-supported streaming television (FAST) channel on Samsung TV Plus.
