= Shinsei Galverse =

Japanese original net animation

- Key visual

新星ギャルバース (Shinsei Gyarubāsu)
- Genre: Science fiction
- Created by: Ayaka Ōhira
- Original net animation
- Directed by: Ayaka Ōhira (chief); Yūta Takamura (co-director)
- Produced by: Arch
- Written by: Natsuko Takahashi; Masahiro Okubo
- Studio: S.o.K
- Released: June 25, 2025
- Runtime: 22 minutes

Shinsei Galverse (新星ギャルバース, Shinsei Gyarubāsu) is a Japanese fan-funded original net animation (ONA) produced by Arch and animated by S.o.K. The series blends 1990s anime visual motifs with contemporary science fiction storytelling and was released on YouTube on June 25, 2025.

== Plot ==
The story follows a mysterious girl named Zero who awakens on the planet Amatera with no memory of her past. As she navigates a world engulfed in conflict between a local resistance and a powerful empire known as the Gevuran forces, she encounters Ring, a resistance leader. Over time, Zero begins to uncover hidden aspects of her identity that tie her to a much larger cosmic narrative.

== Production ==
Shinsei Galverse was developed by Arch and animated by S.o.K. The project was initially funded through a digital art initiative connected to the Galverse NFT collection.

Ayaka Ōhira served as the anime's creator and chief director, with Yūta Takamura credited as co-director. The scripts were written by Natsuko Takahashi and Masahiro Okubo, while character designs were adapted by Satoshi Ishino based on Ōhira's originals.

In addition to financial backing, the production encouraged community participation. Fans engaged through online platforms and contributed feedback during various stages of development, including design and promotional elements.

The anime features the theme song "Kyomei Verse" by Taku Takahashi featuring Kamiya.

== Characters ==
Character	Japanese voice actor	Source
Zero	Yui Horie	
D.D.	Fairouz Ai	
Ring	Mutsumi Tamura	
Tabia	Kurumi Nakata	
Vega	Hisako Kanemoto	
Momo	Lynn	
Ran Ran	Ikue Ōtani	
Dr. Wagami	Kotono Mitsuishi	
Uvo	Tomokazu Seki	
Dex	Akio Otsuka	
Iza	Yū Kobayashi	
Luca	Yukari Tamura	
Uno	Rie Tanaka	
M-Lezi	Mamiko Noto	
