= Hotel Inhumans =

Japanese manga series

- First tankōbon volume cover, featuring Sara Haizaki

ホテル・インヒューマンズ (Hoteru Inhyūmanzu)
- Genre: Drama
- Manga
- Written by: Ao Tajima
- Published by: Shogakukan
- English publisher: NA: Seven Seas Entertainment
- Imprint: Sunday Webry Comics
- Magazine: Sunday Webry
- Original run: June 12, 2021 – August 30, 2025
- Volumes: 12
- Anime television series
- Directed by: Tetsurō Amino
- Written by: Shōji Yonemura
- Music by: Koharu
- Studio: Bridge; Aisle (S2)
- Licensed by: Crunchyroll; SEA: Medialink
- Original network: TXN (TV Tokyo), BS TV Tokyo, AT-X, TUY
- Original run: July 6, 2025 – present
- Episodes: 21
- icon

Hotel Inhumans (ホテル・インヒューマンズ, Hoteru Inhyūmanzu) is a Japanese manga series written and illustrated by Ao Tajima. It was serialized online via Shogakukan's Sunday Webry website from June 2021 to August 2025 and was collected in 12 tankōbon volumes. An anime television series adaptation produced by Bridge aired from July to September 2025. A second season co-produced by Aisle premiered in October 2026.

== Premise ==
The series takes place in Hotel Inhumans, a hotel designed for assassins. Concierges Ikuro Hoshi and Sara Haizaki will do whatever they can to ensure that their customers get their desired demands; however, they are also willing to eliminate anyone who threatens to expose the hotel's background.

== Characters ==
Ikuro Hoshi (星 生朗, Hoshi Ikurō)
Voiced by: Yūsuke Kobayashi
One of the concierges of Hotel Inhumans. He is highly intelligent and a skilled tactician. He frequently complains about his job and wishes to quit despite not doing so.
Sara Haizaki (灰咲 沙羅, Haizaki Sara)
Voiced by: Hinano Shirahama
One of the concierges of Hotel Inhumans. She wields a pocket knife which she converts from her hair clip and possesses superhuman strength and speed that enables her to dodge bullets and take down her opponents with ease.
Siao (シャオ)
Voiced by: Koki Uchiyama
A man who was forced to be an assassin to save his sister, but is double-crossed. He turned to Ikuro and Sara for help, and they managed to aid him in incapacitating his enemies and killing the Okajima Group's second head. He soon discovers that his sister had a daughter. He is Mao's older brother and Mei's uncle.
Nina (ニナ)
Voiced by: Haruka Shiraishi
A girl who was trained as an assassin. She idolizes Brain Storming and seems to get along well with Sara. After foiling an assassination attempt on Ru-Chan, she is killed by her organization for her betrayal.
Mao
Siao's younger sister and Mei's mother, who is held hostage to force her older brother to work as an assassin. She was killed, presumably by his double-crossers. It is revealed that she had a family in secret.
Mei
Mao's daughter and Siao's niece. She and Siao meet following her mother's death.
Toshiya Kase
An assassin who is known to wear disguises. He is killed by a person who mistakes him for Shimamoto.
Asami
Kase's wife, who does not know that he is an assassin.
Kenji Shimamoto
A drug dealer who is killed by Toshiya Kase.
Ru-Chan
A pop star idol whom Nina admires and is the leader of a group of performers called Brain Storming. She is targeted for assassination by her boss, but is protected by Sara and Nina.
Mayuko
A member of Brain Storming, whom Sara takes the place of to protect Ru-Chan during a performance at Hotel Inhumans.
Miku
Another assassin who was also hired to kill Ru-Chan, but is stopped by Sara and Nina, who tells her that the one who hired them both is dead.
Iori Hasegawa
An assassin who lost his memories while attempting to kill Rika. Having planned for this, he sent his future self an invitation to help regain his memories. Even so, he had developed feelings for Rika and tried to commit suicide instead of killing Rika before Ikuro stops him and he loses his memories again. As a result, he stops trying to recover his memories and continues his life with Rika.
Rika Sakai
Iori's lover, who doesn't know that he's an assassin. She was his target, but he lost his memories as a part of his plot when trying to kill her.
Ringo Ardell (リンゴ・アデール, Ringo Adēru)
Voiced by: Minami Tsuda
A young girl who was trained as an assassin by her caring master, who died years ago; she actually manipulated Ringo into killing her as a final test. She is now targeted by a group of assassins for stealing money from them as well as undergoing a serious illness. She gets along well with Ikuro and Sara and requests for them to make her miso soup before her upcoming death. Her grave is placed near her deceased mentor.
Roy Murdock (ロイ・マードック, Roi Mādokku)
Voiced by: Kazuyuki Okitsu
A employee who runs the surveillance system in Hotel Inhumans, alerting Sara and Ikuro of any suspicious activates happening in the area.
Double Fang
An elite assassin who is sent after Ringo. Sara seems to know him. He is respectful towards Sara and like her, he also owns a cat.
Yoshinori Kadowaki
A paparazzo who sold his own family out and is known to reveal secrets. After his plot is exposed, he is accidentally killed by a truck trying to escape the police.
Nakata
Yoshinori's assistant. She is actually a member of an informant group called the Spiders, who are in league with Hotel Inhumans. She has a legion of tamed spiders that she can communicate with.
Atsuhiko Suzumura
A former elderly hitman who once visited Hotel Inhumans twenty years ago. He suffers from dementia and memory loss.
Hazuki
Suzumura's daughter, who knows of her father's past.
Danica and Chetana
Voiced by: Yume Miyamoto (Danica), Maki Kawase (Chetana)
A pair of female assassins. Danica was an assassin in her youth while Chetana was a maid. When Danica chose not to kill Chetana, she became a target, but Chetana saved her and they began living with each other as a family. When Chetana was kidnapped, Danica is forced to handle a job in Japan that Chetana refused to do to get her back. Ikuro and Sara eventually rescue them and foil the criminals' plan, but this results in a bounty being placed on the girls' heads. Though now forced on the run from authorities, they are able to watch the meteor shower that they long desired to see and also express their love for each other.
Marei
A prince who seeks to free all slaves in his country. He is targeted for assassination by Aslan, which is foiled by Danica and Chetana.
Aslan
A minster who plans to kill Marei. He is the owner of a secret slave trading operation. He is killed by Danica and Chetana.
Shiihashi
The leader of the New Asia Trading Company. His reputation was destroyed by Danica and Chetana after they sabotage his latest assassination attempt.
Izumiko
The owner of Hotel Inhumans' tailor shop. She seems to be Sara's mentor.
Palan
A slave boy who was sold to Shiihashi. He is rescued by Danica, Chetana, Ikuro, and Sara, who had him sent to an orphanage.
Subaru Yoda
Ozaki's friend. He isn't good at playing piano unlike Ozaki, though he improves in time. He is also secretly an assassin working for Ikuro and Sara. He was supposed to kill Ozaki's father Hirofumi, but he hesitated and Hirofumi ended up dying from an illness instead.
Kanafumi Ozaki
Yoda's friend, who is good at playing piano compared to Yoda. He doesn't know that Yoda is an assassin working for Hotel Inhumans. After his father died from an illness, he continues to practice piano in the future.
Hirofumi Ozaki
Ozaki's father, who is a former diplomat whom many people dislike due to his embezzlement scheme. He was originally meant to be killed by Yoda, but died from an illness before that can happen.
Shiba Kirihara
A new concierge of Hotel Inhumans, who starts working at the hotel later in the story. In the past, she was an orphan who was taken in by Sara. She mostly serves as the hotel's bartender. She dislikes Ikuro due to his soft nature, but admires Sara, who was originally her mentor. Like Sara, she fights with a pocket knife, but also loves cute things. She also bonds with Hikaru.
Hughes
An elderly woman who comes to Hotel Inhumans to request help in finding Edel, her missing dachshund, after he got scared off by thunder. Ikuro and Kirihara eventually managed to help find her dog. Despite her old age, she is still technically an assassin.
Edel
Hughes's dachshund, who has gone missing after being scared away by thunder. He is eventually found and reunited with his owner.
Kishi
An assassin who was wounded during a mission and came to Hotel Inhumans to request to die in the hotel's chapel.
Sekiya
Voiced by: Mitsuki Saiga
A woman who is often spotted riding the train while reading books about subjects such as “murder” and “poison”. She is actually an assassin who works for Ikuro and Sara, and also works as a radio announcer under the alias Kaoru Utsugi. She helped them stop another assassin that planned to kill Eriko.
Eriko Tsukada
A young girl who is targeted by an assassin, but is saved by Sekiya, Ikuro, and Sara. She at first thinks she is useless in her life, but regains her confidence thanks to Sekiya.
Asami
An assassin who is being targeted by a group of assassins for refusing to kill his target, who is a baby named Chisato. Sara helped to save him and the baby.
Chisato
A baby who was meant to be killed by Asami, but the latter couldn't do it and chose to save and adapt him with Sara's help. He seems to like Sara.
Hikaru Matsuki (松木ひかる, Matsuki Hikaru)
Voiced by: Manaka Iwami
A young woman who works at a convenience store to support her ailing elder sister. She develops a bond with Kirihara.
Mitsuru Matsuki (松木充, Matsuki Mitsuru)
Voiced by: Minori Suzuki
Hikaru's older sister who was recently hospitalized. She eventually dies from her illness.

== Media ==
=== Manga ===
Written and illustrated by Ao Tajima, Hotel Inhumans was serialized on Shogakukan's Sunday Webry website from June 12, 2021, to August 30, 2025. Its chapters were collected in 12 tankōbon volumes.

In October 2025, Seven Seas Entertainment announced that they had licensed the series for English publication, with the first volume being released in August 2026.

No.	Original release date	Original ISBN	English release date	English ISBN
1	October 12, 2021	978-4-09-850661-3	August 11, 2026	979-8-89765-914-2
2	March 11, 2022	978-4-09-851021-4	November 3, 2026	979-8-89765-915-9
3	July 12, 2022	978-4-09-851182-2	—	—
4	November 10, 2022	978-4-09-851382-6	—	—
5	March 10, 2023	978-4-09-851780-0	—	—
6	July 12, 2023	978-4-09-852534-8	—	—
7	November 10, 2023	978-4-09-853010-6	—	—
8	April 12, 2024	978-4-09-853198-1	—	—
9	November 19, 2024	978-4-09-853590-3	—	—
10	March 12, 2025	978-4-09-853857-7	—	—
11	June 30, 2025	978-4-09-854160-7	—	—
12	September 19, 2025	978-4-09-854231-4	—	—

=== Anime ===
An anime television series adaptation was announced on November 8, 2024. It is produced by Bridge and directed by Tetsurō Amino, with series composition and screenplays by Shōji Yonemura, Shingo Fujisaski designing the characters, and Koharu of Charan-Po-Rantan composing the music. The series aired from July 6 to September 28, 2025, on TV Tokyo and its affiliates. The opening theme song is "Mister Moonlight" (ミスター・ムーンライト, Misutā・Mūnraito), performed by imase, while the ending theme song is "Merry Go Round", performed by Noa. Crunchyroll streams the series. Medialink licensed the series in Southeast Asia for streaming on Ani-One Asia's YouTube channel.

After the final episode of the first season, a second season was announced. It is co-produced by Aisle, Bridge's subsidiary studio, with the main staff returning from the first season. It premiered on October 4, 2026. The opening theme song is "Rasen" (螺旋; 'Spiral'), performed by Gan, while the ending theme song is "Sweet Pea" (スイートピー, Suītopī), performed by Phantom Siita.

==== Season 1 ====
No.	Title	Directed by (Note: Production staff information is taken from the ending credits of each episode.)	Storyboarded by	Original release date
1	"Sister Sister"; Transliteration: "Shisutā Shisutā" (Japanese: シスター・シスター)	Himari Tamagawa	Tetsurō Amino	July 6, 2025
After an assassin named Siao kills his target, he is betrayed by second head of the Okajima gang as he and his men prepare to kill Siao. Siao narrowly escapes, but is badly injured. A flashback reveals that Siao and his sister Mao were captured by the first head of the Okajima and Siao was forced to work as an assassin in exchange for his sister's freedom when she reaches the age of 20. Every year, he would receive a voice message of Mao singing a lullaby. Following instructions left by the now-deceased first head, Siao arrives at Hotel Inhumans and meets its two concierges, Ikuro Hoshi and Sara Haizaki, who are willing to do whatever tasks that their guests request for. Siao asks for them to find and rescue Mao, though they fear that she might already be dead. Siao is led to a chapel where the second head and his men confront them, but Ikuro reveals that he lured them to the chapel. The criminals prepare to kill Siao and Ikuro, but they are ambushed by Sara, who uses her combat skills to neutralize the criminals. Siao then interrogates the second head, learning that Mao was already murdered before killing him. While visiting Mao's grave, Siao meets a girl named Mei who he realizes is Mao's daughter. Back at the hotel, Ikuro admits he already knew about Mei's existence and secretly arranged for her and Siao to meet.
2	"Dying Service 1"; Transliteration: "Daīngu・Sābisu 1" (Japanese: ダイイング・サービス1)	Tomoya Takayama	Tetsurō Amino	July 13, 2025
A criminal is murdered by Toshiya Kase, an assassin disguised as him. Kase then heads to Hotel Inhumans. After making arrangements for Kase's stay, Ikuro expresses his frustration at serving assassins, who he believes are villains, though Sara points out that assassins have various reasons for killing others and at the end of the day, are still their guests. Meanwhile, Kase reflects on how he is obsessed with the "perfect kill" and has perfectly planned out all aspects of his life except when it comes to his wife Asami, who is the one person he cannot read. After learning about Kase's bewilderment at his wife's habits, Ikuro begins to show a more caring side to him. Later, Kase kills a drug dealer named Kenji Shimamoto while dressed like him, but upon leaving, he comes across Asami, which throws his entire plan off. Fortunately, Asami doesn't recognize him, but the meeting distracts Kase enough that he fails to spot another assassin who mortally wounds him, thinking he is Shimamoto. Ikuro and Sara rush to Kase's aid, but he knows he is too far gone and requests for them to kill him as part of their "Dying Service".
3	"Dying Service 2"; Transliteration: "Daīngu・Sābisu 2" (Japanese: ダイイング・サービス2)	Tomoya Takayama	Tetsurō Amino	July 21, 2025 (Note: This episode aired at 12:45 a.m. JST, 1 hour after the original air time on TV Tokyo.)
A funeral is held for Kase at the hotel, with his coworkers and Asami also in attendance. A flashback reveals how Kase met Asami during a rainy summer. As part of the Dying Service, Ikuro and Sara record Kase's death as sudden heart failure and erase all evidence of his crimes. At the conclusion of the funeral, Sara intercepts a hitman sent by Shimamoto's organization to kill Asami, believing she was involved in Shimamoto's death. Sara clears up the misunderstanding by explaining Asami's was there by pure coincidence. Meanwhile, Ikuro speaks to Asami about Kase's death, and she asks what he was like on the day that he died. Ikuro recalls that Kase's last words were to plead to him and Sara to protect Asami, since a nearby security camera could implicate her in Shimamoto's death. Ikuro tells Asami that she was the one person who could break Kase's stoic nature, and she admits she enjoyed trying to force a reaction out of him. Ikuro then delivers Kase's final letter to Asami, which reveals that he truly did love her. The next day, Sara asks Ikuro if he thinks Kase is special, and thinking back upon how happy Kase looked talking about Asami, he concludes that even if hitmen are criminals, they are still capable of falling in love.
4	"Corpse Reviver"; Transliteration: "Kōpusu・Ribaibā" (Japanese: コープス・リバイバー)	Katsuyuki Komai	Tetsurō Amino	July 27, 2025
A girl named Nina is trained as an assassin by a criminal organization, but begins to show an appreciation for the idol group Brain Storming despite her harsh training to remove her emotions. During her stay at Hotel Inhumans, Nina confides to Sara that she has been ordered to assassinate Ru-Chan, the leader of Brain Storming, and requests to Sara to help her not to kill Ru-Chan, but to protect her instead. Sara arranges Brain Storming's next concert to be held at the hotel, allowing Nina to ambush the replacement assassin assigned to her mission, Miku. While Sara protects Ru-Chan, Miku reveals to Nina that their client is the CEO that owns Brain Storming, who fell into debt and wanted to kill Ru-Chan to drive sales of her last song. Nina reveals she has already killed the client before letting Miku go. Ikuro meets Sara after the concert and is amused to see that Sara has picked up an appreciation for Brain Storming, but is somber at the fact Nina knows she will inevitably be killed for her betrayal. Indeed, while moving through the city, Nina stops to pet a cat before being shot in the head by a sniper.
5	"Remember Me"; Transliteration: "Rimembā・Mī" (Japanese: リメンバー・ミー)	Hiromichi Matano	Tetsurō Amino	August 3, 2025
As Ikuro's one year anniversary of employment at Hotel Inhumans is approaching, Sara informs him that he needs find his motivation to work at the hotel. They go to greet a couple named Iori Hasegawa and Rika Sakai, who show them an invitation. However, the couple are regular civilians, and they explain Iori suffered amnesia after saving Rika from a car accident, and they hope the mysterious invitation they received would be the key to regaining his memories. Iori confides to Ikuro that he's afraid to regain his memories out of fear of Rika leaving him, but Ikuro convinces him otherwise. Sara then attacks Iori to get him to remember his old life, which succeeds. With his memories regained, Iori reveals his true colors as an assassin hired to kill Rika at her "happiest moment". In order to guarantee this, Iori gave himself amnesia and sent the invitation to himself as part of a contingency plan where Sara would help him remember his mission. However, having truly bonded with Rika, he instead chooses to kill himself, but Ikuro stops him and he ends up losing his memories again after hitting his head. Iori decides not to recover his memories and spend the rest of his days with Rika and proposes to her. Sara questions Ikuro over stopping Iori from killing himself and prepares to kill Ikuro if he gives an unsatisfactory answer or doesn't answer in time. Ikuro remarks that he sensed Iori truly wanted to live and responded to it, which satisfies Sara since the mark of a good concierge is to respond to a guest's hidden desires.
6	"A Last Supper 1"; Transliteration: "Saigo no Bansan 1" (Japanese: 最後の晩餐1)	Tomoya Takayama	Tetsurō Amino	August 10, 2025
A young female assassin named Ringo Ardell arrives at the hotel. Roy, the hotel's surveillance operator, informs Ikuro and Sara that Ringo has a special request for them. Ringo asks that they recreate her master's special miso soup, which she intends to have as her final meal due to a terminal illness she is suffering. She explains that she was an orphan who was raised by her master, who used to make her miso soup that had apples as a secret ingredient. As Ikuro and Sara try to replicate the secret miso recipe, Roy warns them that assassins from Ringo's criminal organization are attempting to breach the hotel to kill her, since she has stolen money from them. As Sara fights off the assassins, Ikuro asks Ringo why she stole money if she's going to die soon anyways. Ringo entrusts a file containing her spending records to Ikuro, with the condition he only open it after she is dead. As Ikuro continues to try and replicate the apple miso soup before Ringo dies, Sara confronts an elite assassin sent after her, Double Fang.
7	"A Last Supper 2"; Transliteration: "Saigo No Bansan 2" (Japanese: 最後の晩餐2)	Tomoya Takayama	Tetsurō Amino	August 17, 2025
Sara is very familiar with Double Fang before Ikuro leaves her to deal with him while Ringo comes out to watch. The two prove to be equally matched, though Double Fang gets the upper hand due to Sara being desperate to protect Ringo. Despite receiving some injuries, Sara eventually wins the fight, but she chooses to spare Double Fang; however, Ringo's illness has worsened. In her room, Ringo helps herself to the apple miso soup that Ikuro had prepared for her, also revealing that the main ingredient for the soup isn't an apple but a tomato, specifically tomato ketchup. Ikuro reveals he figured out the clue from Ringo's mentor was actually a riddle, since tomatoes are also known as "love apples". Ringo is shocked to hear this, but nevertheless thanks them. She then has flashbacks of her past with her mentor and when she killed her as her final test before dying. Later, Ikuro and Sara go to visit Ringo's grave, which is placed near her mentor's. It turns out she used the stolen money to purchase a mountain so she can fulfill her mentor's last wish to be buried in Japan. Later, Sara tries learning how to cook the miso soup herself.
8	"Spider"; Transliteration: "Supaidā" (Japanese: スパイダー)	Hisoka Maejima	Tetsurō Amino	August 24, 2025
Journalist Yoshinori Kadowaki and his assistant Nakata tail a famous actress who is apparently having an affair with another man. Nakata wonders if Yoshinori ever has any reservations about his job, since he specializes in causing scandals by exposing other people's secrets, but Yoshinori claims he's doing it to support his wife and child. Suddenly, they witness the actress being murdered by the man she is having an affair with. Sensing a scoop, Yoshinori follows the murderer to Hotel Inhumans. Despite warnings from Nakata, Yoshinori flies a drone over the hotel to spy on it, only for it to be shot down by Sara. Yoshinori flees back to his car, only to find Nakata dead, and he is held at gunpoint by the man, revealed to be Ikuro. Ikuro gives Yoshinori a choice: die on the spot because he knows too much, or sacrifice his family ties to become an informant for Hotel Inhumans. Yoshinori makes the difficult choice to sacrifice his family, and Ikuro knocks him out. Yoshinori then wakes up in a park and learns to his shock that videos of him abusing his wife and son have leaked online. As he flees from the police, he is hit by a truck and killed. Back at the hotel, it is revealed that the entire ordeal was a test set up by Ikuro to see if Yoshinori was worthy become a Spider, a hotel informant, with Nakata and the actress being Spiders themselves, who faked their deaths as part of the act. Ikuro rejected Yoshinori since him selling out his family so easily means he'd be willing to sell out the hotel too, but Nakata points out that the Spiders are shorthanded now due to recent losses. Nakata then privately informs Sara about a sighting of the Grey Rhino, Ikuro's nemesis.
9	"Risk Management"; Transliteration: "Risuko・Manajimento" (Japanese: リスク・マネジメント)	Norikazu Ishigooka	Tetsurō Amino	August 31, 2025
An elderly man named Atsuhiko Suzumura arrives at the hotel and requests a room, claiming that he had stayed here last week. Ikuro and Sara check his identity and confirm that he was a previous guest, but his last stay was 20 years ago. Sara concludes that Atsuhiko is suffering from dementia in his old age, as well as memory issues. Ikuro and Sara decide to return Atsuhiko to the care of his daughter, though he doesn't seem to like the idea. On the way, an old song and the sight of the sea triggers Atsuhiko's memories, and he recalls how twenty years ago, he used to be a skilled hitman. He ended up marrying as part of his cover, but his wife subsequently died young and he was left to raise their daughter Hazuki on his own, which he describes as the most difficult period of his life. Upon returning Atsuhiko to Hazuki, Ikuro and Sara observe that Hazuki is exhausted with having to take care of Atsuhiko constantly. Despite Atsuhiko being safely returned, Ikuro and Sara continue to spy on him to perform "Risk Management" and eliminate him if he reveals the existence of Hotel Inhumans. Fortunately, nobody believes Atsuhiko's claims that he's a hitman due to his dementia, but Hazuki admits that she knew all along due to her accidentally finding his weapons. At her wit's end, she breaks down in tears, and Atsuhiko's first instinct is to hug her to calm her down. Observing this, Ikuro sees that Atsuhiko actually does love his daughter and declares that he is not a threat to the hotel, while also having the Spiders remove evidence of the hotel in Atsuhiko's house.
10	"Another Sky 1"; Transliteration: "Anazā・Sukai 1" (Japanese: アナザー・スカイ1)	Tomoya Takayama	Tetsurō Amino	September 7, 2025
A wealthy couple watches the stars on a balcony before they are shot dead by a pair of assassins named Danica and Chetana, who reveal that the couple are criminals. They see the star constellation Sagittarius before heading to Hotel Inhumans. After booking a room, the pair warn Ikuro and Sara of a terrorist organization called the Asian Falcons. Ikuro takes Danica to the hotel's library, but Chetana follows and warns her to not be reckless before leaving the hotel for one final job. Ikuro and the hotel's doctor examine the Sagittarius constellation tattoo on Danica's back and Ikuro tells the story of Chiron's ancient history. Danica explains her backstory. She had been an assassin ever since she was a child, which is when she met Chetana (who at this time was a maid) and tried to kill her before reconsidering. When assassins came after Danica, Chetana helped her escape. The two then became friends and continued working as assassins. Sara then arrives with a package, which contains Chetana's phone and earring. Answering a phone call, Danica learns that Chetana has been kidnapped by the New Asia Trading Company, who demand that she completes a job in Japan that Chetana had declined earlier in exchange for her freedom. Danica hears a secret code given by Chetana telling her to abandon her and run, which she would only say if she felt there was no chance of escape.
11	"Another Sky 2"; Transliteration: "Anazā・Sukai 2" (Japanese: アナザー・スカイ2)	Tomoya Takayama	Tetsurō Amino	September 14, 2025
At the New Asia Trading Company's hideout, the criminals are disappointed with Chetana for not taking the job, which is to assassinate Prince Marei, who intends to free all slaves in his country. The person who ordered his assassination is his minister Aslan. Not only does Chetana despise slavery, but she knows the New Asia Trading Company intends to kill her and Danica anyway to tie up loose ends. Danica then arrives to take the job, much to Chetana's anger. After one of the criminals tries to rape Chetana, Ikuro unexpectedly arrives and knocks him out with a taser, having entered through the vents. It is revealed that Ikuro and Sara had decided to rescue Chetana after doing some research on the New Asia Trading Company and their hideout in the hotel's library, though Ikuro isn't all the happy with having to go through the vents. Sara also points out that Danica will need to take the job in order for their rescue plan to succeed. As Ikuro and Chetana escape through the vents, Ikuro tells her about the meteor shower that Danica wanted her to see. A flashback reveals that the two saw a meteor shower during their escape, which is when they became friends. After getting out of the building, Ikuro returns Chetana her earring, though she is still upset that Danica would choose to help her rather than flee, as she knew that Danica would be killed if she takes this job, but Ikura reassures her that Danica doesn't intend to die. Meanwhile, Sara prepares to start her part of the plan to rescue Danica.
12	"Another Sky 3"; Transliteration: "Anazā・Sukai 3" (Japanese: アナザー・スカイ3)	Keisuke Nishijima, Katsuyuki Komai	Tetsurō Amino	September 21, 2025
As the time for the assassination draws near, the boss of the New Asia Trading Company, Shiihashi, continues to try and coerce Danica into going through with it. During this time, Danica recalls her past. When Shiihashi learns of Chetana's absence, Sara then ambushes Shiihashi and his men using smoke bombs, with Danica aiding her in the battle. Shiihashi takes the young slave boy serving as Danica's spotter hostage in an attempt to make them stand down and force Danica to kill Prince Marei. He also reveals that Aslan is the leader of a secret slave trading operation. Ikuro and Chetana then unexpectedly arrive (having learned of the fastest way to reach their location via the hotel's library) and restrain Shiihashi's men, which distracts Shiihashi long enough for Sara to knock him out and rescue the slave boy. However, the slave boy picks up a gun and attempts to kill the unconscious Shiihashi in revenge for his abuse, with Danica standing his way in the last second and getting wounded in the shoulder. Danica insists the slave boy not dirty his hands with killing, as she and Chetana will do it in his stead. After taking a moment to appreciate the meteor shower, Danica and Chetana then turn the tables on Shiihashi by assassinating Minister Aslan instead, ruining his operation and Shiihashi's reputation. Danica then embraces the slave boy.
13	"Another Sky 4"; Transliteration: "Anazā・Sukai 4" (Japanese: アナザー・スカイ4)	Tomoya Takayama	Tetsurō Amino	September 28, 2025
In the aftermath of Shiihashi's defeat, the slave boy is sent to live in an orphanage. He becomes friends with a younger boy and introduces himself as Palan. However, Danica and Chetana are now being hunted by the authorities for murdering Aslan while Ikuro had to work hard to eliminate evidence of his and Sara's involvement in the assassination. The news reports that a meteor shower is approaching, but a storm will make it hard to see in the city. Meanwhile, Sara visits the hotel's tailor shop run by Izumiko to bring a guest's suit for repairs. Meanwhile, Danica and Chetana are sent to Wyoming by Ikuro, and they manage to view the meteor shower. Despite figuring that they have roughly a month before they're either caught by the authorities or the underworld, they express their feelings to each other. The next day, Ikuro and Sara continue their jobs as concierges of Hotel Inhumans as a wheelchair-bounded assassin, who is dripping blood, approaches them. A post-credits scene has Ikuro and Sara bid farewell to the audience and hope that they will return.

==== Season 2 ====
No.	Title	Directed by	Written by	Storyboarded by	Original release date
14	"Piano Lesson 1"	Unknown	Unknown	TBA	October 4, 2026
At a school, two boys named Subaru Yoda and Kanafumi Ozaki are playing piano. Yoda is struggling with it as he can only play one song while Ozaki is very good at it though. After accidentally damaging a phone, they go to get it checked and Yoda buys a screen protector for Ozaki. News reports reveal that Ozaki's father Hirofumi is a hated criminal due to his alleged involvement in an embezzlement scandal. Ozaki hopes for his father to attend his recital. After they part ways, Yoda visits Hotel Inhumans requesting for Ikuro and Sara's help to erase a video with evidence, revealing that he is an assassin working for them and is undercover at Ozaki's school. Sara reveals that a grand piano has arrived in the hotel for him to practice on and Yoda tells them about Hirofumi and is tracking Ozaki with Nakata's help. Yoda plans to kill Hirofumi himself during the recital. He and Ozaki practice for the recital and Yoda slowly improves with Ozaki, Ikuro, and Sara's help. Yoda also practices shooting a gun. At one point, Ozaki tells Yoda more about his father's past, causing Yoda to have doubts over this assassination plan.
15	"Piano Lesson 2"	Unknown	Unknown	TBA	October 11, 2026
Yoda puts his assassination plan in motion with Ikuro and Sara's assistance while continuing to practice piano and spend time with Ozaki. Eventually, Yoda finally does well at playing the piano. On the day of the recital, Yoda and Ozaki see Hirofumi in the audience with a bouquet of flowers. During the performance, Ozaki remembers his school days and his time with Yoda. As Hirofumi goes onstage to give Ozaki the bouquet, Yoda prepares to shoot him but hesitates when he recalls his friendship with Ozaki. Before Yoda can pull the trigger, Hirofumi suddenly collapses and dies. It turns out that Hirofumi lied about his medical condition so he could attend the recital and succumbed to it. Back at the hotel, Yoda prepares to erase his cover identity and move on to the next job, but still harbors regrets about abandoning Ozaki. Ikuro advises Yoda to let the matter go, but Yoda plays his part of the piano duet as his final farewell to Ozaki despite him not being present to hear it. Many years later, it is revealed that Yoda anonymously sends Ozaki the same bouquet he was supposed to receive from his father every year, with Ozaki claiming he does not know who is sending them.
16	"A Sweet Job 1"	Unknown	Unknown	TBA	October 18, 2026
Ikuro experiences a nightmare from his past, which worries Sara. Ikuro reveals that he used to play piano, but not anymore. Despite desiring to quit his job, he cannot bring himself to do so. Sara convinces Ikuro to accept his soft side. Several days later, Ikuro visits the hotel's bar where he begins questioning the hotel's purpose and his job. After Shiba Kirihara, a new concierge, deals with two criminals, she later confronts Ikuro for his soft side and tries to attack him, but Sara stops her. Kirihara reveals that she idolizes Sara, who trained her to be an assassin in the past. In one of the rooms, an elderly assassin named Hughes is visited by the three concierges, who request for their help in finding her missing companion Edel, revealed to be a dachshund, who ran away after being frightened by loud thunder. Kirihara and Ikuro go to find Edel with the Spiders' help while Sara watches over Hughes. Ikuro and Kirihara reach the place where Edel ran off and begin their search for him.
17	"A Sweet Job 2, First Guest"	Unknown	Unknown	TBA	October 25, 2026
A Sweet Job 2: The search for Edel continues to prove unsuccessful and as a storm rolls in, Kirihara lectures Ikuro that they cannot expect happy endings all the time and must prepare for the worst. However, Ikuro gets the idea that since Hughes and Edel loved roses, Edel must have sought them out. They head to a nearby rose garden and Ikuro does indeed find Edel there. The next day after the storm ends, Hughes is happily reunited with Edel and Sara mentions that she had to protect Hughes from her client since Hughes canceled her job to focus on searching for Edel, which her client didn't take kindly. With everything settled, the three concierges go the bar and complain how the last job was exhausting for all of them. First Guest: An assassin named Kishi calls the hotel for assistance, admitting that he is a first time guest. Kirihara goes to pick him up. As he is brought to the hotel, he experiences flashbacks of his previous kills until he is taken to the hotel's chapel, where it is revealed he was mortally wounded in his most recent job and has chosen the chapel to be where to die. All three concierges are present to keep him company in his final moments.
18	"Follow-up"	TBA	TBA	TBA	November 1, 2026
A young girl named Eriko Tsukada lives with her mother in an apartment block and attends cram school. Her mother also works as a nurse. After the two head out for the day, Eriko boards a train and goes to cram school. Later during a full moon, Eriko rushes to get home and trips on a loose tile, but is saved by a woman, who warns her about the dangers that exist in the world as they board a train, where Eriko notices some strange people. Eriko's routine repeats for several days and she eventually meets the same woman from before. After tripping and hurting her leg, the woman then helps her and Eriko reveals how rough her life is going and thinks she's useless. After the woman comforts her, Eriko realizes that she is Kaoru Utsugi, the radio announcer, and was listening to her broadcasts. Eriko reunites with her mother, but Kaoru leaves before she can introduce her. On a bridge, Kaoru reveals that she is actually an assassin named Sekiya and is working for Ikuro and Sara, who were the people on the train. She had aided them in subduing another assassin who was targeting children and that he planned to kill Eriko next. Later, Eriko continues her daily routine, having regained her confidence. In the future, she finally wears the school uniform that she long desired.
19	"Don't Cry, Baby"	TBA	TBA	TBA	November 8, 2026
As Sara protects a baby named Chisato from assassins, Kirihara rushes to her aid while Ikuro and Roy try to find her location. Kirihara still needs twenty minutes to reach the warehouse where she, Chisato, and an injured assassin named Asami are hiding, so Sara fights back against the assassins to buy time. A flashback reveals that when Sara went to pick up Asami, he was attacked by the assassins, so she rescued him and Chisato and hid in the warehouse. Ikuro reveals that the true reason why Asami is being targeted is because he failed his mission and allowed his target to escape. Sara can't comfort Chisato and fight off the assassins at the same time, so she looks in Asami's bag and uses a toy snowman that plays the song Jingle Bells to keep Chisato calm so she can defeat the assassins before Kirihara arrives, but the toy snowman is destroyed in the process. They return to the hotel where Ikuro has set up a Christmas tree. Asami has recovered while Chisato has taken a liking to Sara. The hotel staff look after Chisato for a few days. Asami asks for them to take Chisato to a safe home and reveals that he was tasked with killing Chisato, which he couldn't bring himself to do, having decided that he cannot allow Chisato to be a part of his dangerous life. However, Ikuro and Sara manage to convince him to take care of Chisato. After Asami leaves with Chisato, he plays the song Jingle Bells using the same toy snowman from before, having been remade by Sara, to make Chisato happy.
20	"Motorcycle Diaries 1"	TBA	TBA	TBA	November 15, 2026
After having a dream regarding her older sister Mitsaru, who was hospitalized, Hikaru Matsuki now works at a store to help her ill sister. Kirihara arrives to buy something, but forgets her wallet. Despite this, Kirihara still manages to get the toy that she wanted before helping out two young sisters. This causes Hikaru to remember her past. Kirihana later buys more toys and spends time with Hikaru. Ikuro and Sara grow concerned about Kirihara's love for cute things. Hikaru later discovers that Mitsaru has died and tells this to Kirihara. Hikaru then asks for Kirihana to take her to the ocean to figure out why they stopped drawing in their picture diary. Hikaru then remembers her past, recalling when her sister had fallen ill and was hospitalized and she began working part time to provide support for Mitsaru. After reaching their destination, Kirihara and Hikaru start to develop a bond.
21	"Motorcycle Diaries 2"	TBA	TBA	TBA	November 22, 2026
Sometime ago, Kirihana does more research on Hikaru and Mitsaru's background before going to see Hikaru to buy toys. It is also revealed that Sara visited Mitsaru sometime ago and promises to protect her sister before Mitsaru died, also revealing that Mitsaru is an assassin. Back in the present, Kirihana and Hikaru arrive at the beach, but Hikaru still can't understand why they stopped drawing in the picture diary, which is missing a page. After reading text messages from her aunt regarding her sister, Hikaru begins wondering why she forgot this whole thing in the first place, and remembers showing a painting to Mitsaru. The diary is then blown away in the wind. Kirihana and Hikaru chase after it on Kirihana's motorcycle and manage to recover it, only for them to fall into the ocean, but they survive. Hikaru has another memory of her and Mitsaru visiting the beach when they were young, and she nearly drowned, which was why they stopped drawing and why there was a missing page as she didn't want to remember any of this in the first place. Back at the hotel, Ikuro reveals to Sara that Mitsaru wished for Hikaru to accept her death and they intended to fulfill her wish. While revisiting Hikaru's store, Kirihana remembers her own past when she was all alone and was taken in by Sara. Hikaru gives Kirihana her picture diary, having drawn a picture of last night's events in it. Later, Hikaru finds a sketchbook in her apartment that has drawn sketches that were made by Mitsaru.
22	"Wandering Bird"	TBA	TBA	TBA	November 29, 2026

== Reception ==
The series has been recommended by manga artist Rei Hiroe and novelist Kotaro Isaka.
