= Tetsurō Amino =

Japanese anime director

- Born: October 10, 1955 (age 70); Chiba Prefecture, Japan
- Occupation: Anime director

Tetsurō Amino (アミノ テツロー, Amino Tetsurō; birth name: 網野 哲郎) is a Japanese anime director, born on October 10, 1955, in Chiba Prefecture. In 1988, he started using his name in katakana.

== Works ==
- Arashi no Yoru ni: Himitsu no Tomodachi
- Bakusō Kyōdai Let's & Go!!
- Bubu Chacha
- DT Eightron
- Hiwou War Chronicles
- Hotel Inhumans
- Hutch the Honeybee
- Idol Densetsu Eriko
- Iria: Zeiram the Animation
- Macross 7
  - Macross 7: The Galaxy's Calling Me!
  - Macross Dynamite 7
- Private Psycho Lesson
- Rainbow Days
- Shiki
- Shippū! Iron Leaguer
