= List of To Your Eternity episodes =

Cover of the first home media release, featuring Fushi

To Your Eternity is a Japanese anime television series based on the manga series of the same name written and illustrated by Yoshitoki Ōima. The anime adaptation was announced by Kodansha on January 8, 2020. The series is animated by Brain's Base and directed by Masahiko Murata, with Shinzō Fujita handling series composition, and Koji Yabuno designing the characters, and Ryo Kawasaki composing the series' music. The plot follows an immortal creature, Fushi, who wanders the Earth after interacting with humans and developing his own will and consciousness in the process.

Originally scheduled to premiere in October 2020, the series was delayed due to the COVID-19 pandemic, and eventually aired from April 12 to August 30, 2021, on NHK Educational TV, and ran for 20 episodes. Crunchyroll licensed the anime for streaming outside of Asia. Medialink also acquired the series for streaming on Ani-One Asia's YouTube channel. The opening theme song is "Pink Blood", performed by Hikaru Utada, while the ending theme song is "Mediator", composed by Masashi Hamauzu.

Following the final episode of the first season, a second season was announced. Drive replaced Brain's Base in animating the second season, while Kiyoko Sayama replaced Masahiko Murata as director, with the rest of the main staff reprising their roles from the first season. The season aired from October 23, 2022, to March 12, 2023, and ran for 20 episodes. The opening theme song is "Pink Blood", performed by Hikaru Utada, reused with updated visuals in the opening credits to represent the new story arcs, while the ending theme song is "Roots", composed by Masashi Hamauzu.

Following the final episode of the second season, a third season was announced. Studio Massket joined Drive to animate the third season, with Sōta Yokote directing and Sayama returning from the second season as chief director, with the rest of the staff and cast reprising their roles. The season aired for 22 episodes from October 4, 2025, to March 28, 2026, on NHK General TV. The opening theme song is "Fumetsu no Anata" (ふめつのあなた; lit. 'Your Eternity'), performed by Perfume, while the ending theme song is "Recollections", composed by Masashi Hamauzu.

== Series overview ==
Season	Episodes	Originally released	
Season	Episodes	First released	Last released
1	20	April 12, 2021	August 30, 2021
2	20	October 23, 2022	March 12, 2023
3	22	October 4, 2025	March 28, 2026

== Episodes ==
=== Season 1 (2021) ===
No.	Title	Directed by (Note: Information is taken from the ending credits of each episode.)	Written by	Storyboarded by	Original release date
1	"The Last One"; Transliteration: "Saigo no Hitori" (Japanese: 最後のひとり)	Masahiko Murata	Shinzō Fujita	Masahiko Murata	April 12, 2021
2	"A Rambunctious Girl"; Transliteration: "Otonashikunai Shōjō" (Japanese: おとなしくない少女)	Masahiko Murata	Shinzō Fujita	Masahiko Murata	April 19, 2021
3	"A Small Evolution"; Transliteration: "Chīsana Shinka" (Japanese: 小さな進化)	Tomio Yamauchi	Shinzō Fujita	Masahiko Murata	April 26, 2021
4	"A Large Vessel"; Transliteration: "Ōkina Utsuwa" (Japanese: 大きな器)	Tomio Yamauchi	Shinzō Fujita	Masahiro Aizawa	May 3, 2021
5	"Those Who Follow"; Transliteration: "Tomo ni Yuku Hito" (Japanese: 共にゆく人)	Masahiko Murata	Shinzō Fujita	Masahiko Murata	May 10, 2021
6	"Our Goals"; Transliteration: "Watashitachi no Mokuteki" (Japanese: 私たちの目的)	Tomio Yamauchi	Shinzō Fujita	Isamu	May 17, 2021
7	"The Boy Who Wants to Change"; Transliteration: "Kawaritai Shōnen" (Japanese: 変わりたい少年)	Masahiko Murata	Shinzō Fujita	Masahiko Murata	May 24, 2021
8	"Monster Brothers"; Transliteration: "Kaibutsu Kyōdai" (Japanese: 怪物兄弟)	Haruhito Ogawa	Shinzō Fujita	Keiji Gotō	May 31, 2021
9	"Deep Memories"; Transliteration: "Fukai Kioku" (Japanese: 深い記憶)	Tomio Yamauchi	Shinzō Fujita	Minoru Ōhara	June 7, 2021
10	"New Family"; Transliteration: "Atarashii Kazoku" (Japanese: 新しい家族)	Takafumi Fujii	Shinzō Fujita	Keiji Gotō	June 14, 2021
11	"Gift From the Past"; Transliteration: "Kako Kara no Okurimono" (Japanese: 過去からの贈り物)	Masahiko Murata	Shinzō Fujita	Masahiko Murata	June 21, 2021
12	"Awakening"; Transliteration: "Mezame" (Japanese: 目覚め)	Masahiko Murata	Shinzō Fujita	Masahiko Murata	June 28, 2021
Special	"Fushi's Journey"; Transliteration: "Fushi no Tabiji" (Japanese: フシの旅路)	Takashi Nakajima	N/A	N/A	July 5, 2021
13	"Aspiring to Go Higher"; Transliteration: "Takami e no Ishi" (Japanese: 高みへの意志)	Miyuki Ōshiro	Shinzō Fujita	Masahiko Murata	July 12, 2021
14	"Jananda, Island of Freedom"; Transliteration: "Jiyū no Shima Jananda" (Japanese: 自由の島・ジャナンダ)	Tomio Yamauchi	Shinzō Fujita	Masaki Ōzora	July 19, 2021
15	"A Girl Named Tonari"; Transliteration: "Tonari to Iu Na no Shōjo" (Japanese: トナリという名の少女)	Kōki Onoue	Shinzō Fujita	Masaki Ōzora	July 26, 2021
16	"The Children's Dreams"; Transliteration: "Kodomo-tachi no Yume" (Japanese: 子どもたちの夢)	Tomio Yamauchi	Shinzō Fujita	Masahiko Murata	August 2, 2021
17	"The Defeated"; Transliteration: "Senkaku-sha" (Japanese: 先覚者)	Takafumi Fujii	Shinzō Fujita	Minoru Ōhara	August 9, 2021
18	"To Continue On"; Transliteration: "Susumi Yuku Tame ni" (Japanese: 進み行くために)	Ken Sanuma	Shinzō Fujita	Masaki Ōzora	August 16, 2021
19	"Wandering Rage"; Transliteration: "Samayou Satsui" (Japanese: さまよう殺意)	Masahiko Murata	Shinzō Fujita	Masahiko Murata	August 23, 2021
20	"Echoes"; Transliteration: "Zankyō" (Japanese: 残響)	Masahiko Murata	Shinzō Fujita	Masahiko Murata	August 30, 2021

=== Season 2 (2022–23) ===
No. overall	No. in season	Title	Directed by	Original release date
21	1	"Infatuation Reborn"; Transliteration: "Tensei Suru Aishū" (Japanese: 転生する愛執)	Shōta Hamada	October 23, 2022
22	2	"Beating Will"; Transliteration: "Kodō Suru Yuigon" (Japanese: 鼓動する遺言)	Takahiro Tanaka	October 30, 2022
23	3	"The Awaited"; Transliteration: "Machinozoma Reta Eiyū" (Japanese: 待ち望まれた者)	Masahiko Watanabe	November 6, 2022
24	4	"The Young Man Who Can See"; Transliteration: "Mieru Seinen" (Japanese: 視える青年)	Toshiyuki Sone	November 13, 2022
25	5	"The Holy Man's Voyage"; Transliteration: "Seija no Ensei" (Japanese: 聖者の遠征)	Shōta Hamada	November 20, 2022
26	6	"Heretics Betrayed"; Transliteration: "Itan no To" (Japanese: 異端の徒)	Yoshihisa Matsumoto	November 27, 2022
27	7	"Crime and Forgiveness"; Transliteration: "Batsu to Yurushi" (Japanese: 罰とゆるし)	Takahiro Tanaka	December 4, 2022
28	8	"Beyond Dreams"; Transliteration: "Yume no Saki" (Japanese: 夢の先)	Masahiko Watanabe	December 11, 2022
29	9	"Expanding Consciousness"; Transliteration: "Hirogaru Ishiki" (Japanese: 拡がる意識)	Shunji Yoshida	December 18, 2022
30	10	"Resonance"; Transliteration: "Kyōmei" (Japanese: 共鳴)	Matsuo Asami	December 25, 2022
31	11	"The Value of Flesh"; Transliteration: "Niku no Kachi" (Japanese: 肉の価値)	Masahiko Watanabe	January 8, 2023
32	12	"Secret Behind the Veil"; Transliteration: "Bēru ga Himeru Mono" (Japanese: ベールが秘めるもの)	Kiyoko Sayama	January 15, 2023
33	13	"The Wise Man's Identity"; Transliteration: "Kenja no Shōtai" (Japanese: 賢者の正体)	Ken Sanuma	January 22, 2023
34	14	"Morning of Rebirth"; Transliteration: "Saisei no Asa" (Japanese: 再生の朝)	Shunji Yoshida	January 29, 2023
35	15	"The Self, Worn Down"; Transliteration: "Mamō Suru Jiga" (Japanese: 摩耗する自我)	Masahiko Watanabe	February 5, 2023
36	16	"Three Eternal Warriors"; Transliteration: "Fumetsu no San Senshi" (Japanese: 不滅の三戦士)	Kiyoko Sayama	February 12, 2023
37	17	"What You Want to Protect"; Transliteration: "Mamo Ritai Mono" (Japanese: 守りたいもの)	Shunji Yoshida	February 19, 2023
38	18	"Death of the Deathless"; Transliteration: "Fujimi no Shi" (Japanese: 不死身の死)	Matsuo Asami	February 26, 2023
39	19	"And Then, Dawn"; Transliteration: "Soshite Hinode e" (Japanese: そして日の出へ)	Masahiko Watanabe	March 5, 2023
40	20	"End of an Era"; Transliteration: "Jidai no Owari" (Japanese: 時代の終わり)	Kiyoko Sayama	March 12, 2023

=== Season 3 (2025–26) ===
No. overall	No. in season	Title	Directed by (Note: Production staff information is taken from the ending credits of each episode.)	Storyboarded by	Original release date
41	1	"Peaceful World"; Transliteration: "Odayakanaru Yo" (Japanese: 最後のひとり)	Sōta Yokote	Kiyoko Sayama	October 4, 2025
42	2	"A Knot in the Soul"; Transliteration: "Kokoro no Musubi-me" (Japanese: こころのむすびめ)	Pei Ni Hong	Kiyoko Sayama	October 11, 2025
43	3	"Mizuha"; Transliteration: "Mizuha" (Japanese: みずは)	Marina Maki	Kiyoko Sayama	October 18, 2025
44	4	"The One Who Vanished"; Transliteration: "Inaku Natta Hito" (Japanese: いなくなったひと)	Naoki Horiuchi	Kiyoko Sayama	October 25, 2025
45	5	"Unheard Words"; Transliteration: "Todokanu Kotoba" (Japanese: とどかぬことば)	Ken Sanuma	Hidetoshi Yoshida	November 1, 2025
46	6	"Proof of Peace"; Transliteration: "Heiwa no Shōmei" (Japanese: へいわのしょうめい)	Tadashi Nakamura	Kiyoko Sayama	November 8, 2025
47	7	"The Attack"; Transliteration: "Shūgeki" (Japanese: しゅうげき)	Hiroyuki Takeuchi	Kiyoko Sayama	November 15, 2025
48	8	"Trouble"; Transliteration: "Yakkai-goto" (Japanese: やっかいごと)	Michita Shiroishi	Kiyoko Sayama	November 22, 2025
49	9	"Rejected Life"; Transliteration: "Kobamu Inochi" (Japanese: こばむいのち)	Marina Maki	Kiyoko Sayama	November 29, 2025
50	10	"Become as People"; Transliteration: "Hito no Furi" (Japanese: ひとのふり)	Ken Sanuma	Ken Sanuma	December 6, 2025
51	11	"Their Home"; Transliteration: "Kare ra no Ie" (Japanese: かれらのいえ)	Hiroyuki Takeuchi	Kiyoko Sayama	December 13, 2025
52	12	"Flying Bug"; Transliteration: "Tobu Mushi" (Japanese: とぶむし)	Tadashi Nakamura	Kiyoko Sayama	December 20, 2025
53	13	"Number One"; Transliteration: "Ichiban" (Japanese: いちばん)	Utsugi Toshima & Dandan Yu	Kiyoko Sayama	January 10, 2026 (Note: While airing its premiere on NHK General TV on December 27, 2025, episode 53 was halted due to a coverage of an earthquake. It reaired in its complete format on January 10, 2026.)
54	14	"Where One Belongs"; Transliteration: "Irubeki Basho" (Japanese: いるべきばしょ)	Marina Maki	Kiyoko Sayama	January 17, 2026
55	15	"Leaving Alone"; Transliteration: "Hitorida Chi" (Japanese: ひとりだち)	Kiyoko Sayama	Kiyoko Sayama	January 24, 2026
56	16	"Connective"; Transliteration: "Tsunagu Mono" (Japanese: つなぐもの)	Shinichi Tabe	Kiyoko Sayama	January 31, 2026
57	17	"Invisible Battle"; Transliteration: "Mienu Tatakai" (Japanese: みえぬたたかい)	Sayaka Niwa	Kiyoko Sayama	February 28, 2026 (Note: Episode 57 was delayed by three weeks due to NHK's coverage of the 2026 Winter Olympics.)
58	18	"A Willingness to Believe"; Transliteration: "Shinjiru Kokoro" (Japanese: しんじるこころ)	Sōta Yokote	Kiyoko Sayama & Akira Oguro	March 7, 2026
59	19	"Clean Water"; Transliteration: "Kireina Mizu" (Japanese: きれいなみず)	Marina Maki	Kiyoko Sayama	March 14, 2026
60	20	"Coexist"; Transliteration: "Kyōzon" (Japanese: きょうぞん)	Marina Maki	Kiyoko Sayama	March 21, 2026
61	21	"Stay Here"; Transliteration: "Kono Mama Koko de" (Japanese: このままここで)	Michita Shiraishi	Kiyoko Sayama	March 28, 2026
62	22	"To Fushi"; Transliteration: "Fushi e" (Japanese: フシへ)	Kiyoko Sayama	Kiyoko Sayama	March 28, 2026

== Home media release ==
=== Japanese ===
Aniplex (Japan – Region 2/A)
Volume	Episodes	Release date	Ref.
Season 1
1	1–6	August 25, 2021	
2	7–12	October 27, 2021	
3	13–20	December 22, 2021	
Season 2
1	21–30	April 26, 2023	
2	31–40	July 26, 2023	

=== English ===
Viz Media (United States and Canada – Region 1/A)
Volume	Episodes	Discs	Release date	Ref.
1	1–20	3	July 30, 2024	

Crunchyroll (United Kingdom – Region 2/B)
Volume	Episodes	Discs	Release date	Ref.
1	1–20	3	January 20, 2025	
1	21–40	3	April 14, 2025	
