= List of To Your Eternity chapters =

Yoshitoki Ōima debuted To Your Eternity in issue #50 of Kodansha's shōnen manga magazine Weekly Shōnen Magazine on November 9, 2016. The manga was announced on May 23, 2016. It is Ōima's second series in Weekly Shōnen Magazine; her first series was the critically acclaimed A Silent Voice. The story follows an immortal being, Fushi, who arrives on the Earth and takes the form of an abandoned young villager and his wolf.

The series' first arc finished on December 4, 2019, while the second arc started on January 22, 2020. An anime television series adaptation by Brain's Base premiered on April 12, 2021.

On January 17, 2017, Kodansha USA announced that they would digitally publish the first ten chapters of the series on various digital platforms. Thereafter, they will publish the manga's new chapters simultaneously with the Japanese release. The first printed volume in North America was released on October 31, 2017.

== Volumes ==
No.	Original release date	Original ISBN	English release date	English ISBN
1	January 17, 2017	978-4-06-395842-3	October 31, 2017	978-1-63236-571-2
1. "The Final One" (最後のひとり, Saigo no Hitori); 2. "The Immature Girl" (おとなしくない少女, Otonashikunai Shōjō); 3. "Playing House" (ままごと, Mamagoto); 4. "A Minor Evolution" (小さな進化, Chīsana Shinka)
After falling to Earth, a divine stone takes the form of wolf it touched and slowly develops its own life. After wandering in a frozen area, the wolf meets a young abandoned villager who mistakes him for his pet Johan. The youth takes care of the wolf and teaches him how to eat as he also dreams of wanting to meet more people. However, after suffering a major wound, the boy dies. Before dying, the boy asks the wolf never to forget him causing it to take his human form and wander the Earth. Unable to live on his own, the wolf dies multiple times but his immortality allows him to return to life in a few moments. Meanwhile, a young village girl named March escapes from her home to avoid being used as a sacrifice to Oniguma the Bear God. As she escapes, she meets the white-haired immortal boy whom she decides to adopt under the name of Fushi after teaching him how to eat and behave like a person. Fearing another innocent girl would be sacrificed, March returns to Ninanah. However, Fushi follows her and kills the bear that was going to eat March and her elder sister figure Parona.
2	March 17, 2017	978-4-06-395887-4	December 19, 2017	978-1-63236-572-9
5. "Journey of Memories" (追想の旅路, Tsuisō no Tabiji); 6. "The Comfortable Land of Yanome" (住みよい国ヤノメ, Sumi yoi Kuni Yanome); 7. "A Large Vessel" (大きな器, Ōkina Utsuwa); 8. "Liberation Plan" (解放計画, Kaihō Keikaku); 9. "A Meaningful Death" (意味ある死, Imi aru Shi); 10. "Playing with Dolls" (にんぎょう遊び, Ningyō Asobi); 11. "Those Who Accompany You" (共にゆく人, Tomoni yuku Hito); 12. "One Who Collects, One Who Steals" (集める者、奪う者, Atsumeru Mono, Ubau Mono); 13. "Our Objective" (私達の目的, Watashitachi no Mokuteki)
Hayase declares that March, Parona, and Fushi can be spared if they follow her to the nation of Yanome. However, it is revealed to be a trap and three are imprisoned. Parona manages to break out of prison and find a route so that March and Fushi can find a way back to safety. Hayase's group attacks, and March dies shielding Parona from an arrow fired by Hayase. This enrages Fushi who transforms into the injured white bear and defeats the attackers; scarring Hayase's face in process. Back in her village, a depressed Parona tells Fushi to escape as Yanome want him. Fushi does it and is accompanied by an elder, Pioran, who is curious about his supernatural abilities. Thanks to her, Fushi learns how to talk and think for himself but encounters a creature that attempts to steal his forms and memories. Following Fushi's victory, an unknown silhouette called "the Beholder" claims that the two have a goal of preserving the world, much to Fushi's confusion.
3	June 16, 2017	978-4-06-395955-0	February 13, 2018	978-1-63236-573-6
14. "The Boy Who Wants to Change" (変わりたい少年, Kawaritai Shōnen); 15. "The Two 'Monsters'" (二人の"怪物", Futari no "Kaibutsu"); 16. "Guinea Pig" (実験台, Jikken-dai); 17. "Things Let Go" (手放したもの, Tebanashita mono); 18. "New Life" (新しい人生, Atarashī Jinsei); 19. "Deep Memory" (深い記憶, Fukai Kioku); 20. "The Exterior of Humans and 'Monsters'" (人間と"怪物"の外側, Ningen to "Kaibutsu" no Sotogawa); 21. "An Encounter Before Returning Home" (帰宅前の遭遇, Kitaku mae no Sōgū); 22. "Fight of the Brothers" (兄弟達の戦い, Kyōdai-tachi no Tatakai); 23. "The Price of Flames" (対価の火, Taika no Hi); 24. "New Family" (新しい家族, Atarashī Kazoku)
Fushi and Pioran reach the "Beer Gramps' shop" where they stay to live as they befriend the owner, simply called Booze Man. However, Fushi has problems interacting with the masked assistant Gugu who is jealous of how the girl Rean Cropp is attracted to Fushi. As they meet, Fushi accidentally shows his immortality traits which Gugu abuses to make Fushi's body create replicas of other objects. The antagonistic Gugu abandons the shop, but Fushi and Ren follow him. They learn that Gugu wears a mask to cover his deformed face but still bond with him. Shortly afterwards, the invisible hooded man that knows about Fushi's origins, arrives and tells him that he must leave the area. However, Fushi ignores him and spends four years staying in the restaurant in order to learn how to cook.
4	September 15, 2017	978-4-06-510189-6	April 10, 2018	978-1-63236-574-3
25. "Winding Road" (まがりみち, Magari-michi); 26. "Crossroads" (わかれみち, Wakare-michi); 27. "Gift from the Past" (過去からの贈り物, Kako kara no Okurimono); 28. "The Megalith which Rends the Earth" (大地割る巨石, Daichi waru Kyoseki); 29. "The End of the Mask" (仮面の最期, Kamen no Saigo); 30. "The Family on the Hill" (丘の上の一家, Oka no ue no Ikka); 31. "Awakening" (目覚め, Mezame); 32. "Straying Path" (惑う旅路, Madou Tabiji); 33. "Will Toward a Higher State" (高みへの意志, Takami e no Ishi); 34. "Isolated Land of Death" (閉ざされた死地, Tozasareta Shichi)
5	November 11, 2017	978-4-06-510385-2	June 12, 2018	978-1-63236-575-0
35. "The Spinning Girl" (紡ぐ少女, Tsumugu Shōjo); 36. "Jananda: Land of the Free" (自由の島・ジャナンダ, Jiyū no Shima・Jananda); 37. "New Shape" (新しい型, Atarashī Kata); 38. "Query" (問い, Toi); 39. "The Proud Warrior" (誇り高い戦士, Hokori takai Senshi); 40. "The Girl Called Tonari" (トナリという少女, Tonari to iu Shōjo); 41. "New Power" (新しい力, Atarashī Chikara); 42. "The Children's Dreams" (子供たちの夢, Kodomo-tachi no Yume); 43. "Sender of the Gift" (プレゼントの贈り主, Purezento no Okurinushi); 44. "Pioneer" (先覚者, Senkaku-sha)
6	February 16, 2018	978-4-06-510963-2	August 14, 2018	978-1-63236-576-7
45. "Separation" (分離, Bunri); 46. "Setting Sail" (船出, Funade); 47. "Impending Dawn" (夜明けに向けて, Yoake ni Mukete); 48. "After the Selection" (選定の先, Sentei no Saki); 49. "To Move Forward" (進み行くために, Susumi iku tame ni); 50. "Wandering Bloodlust" (さまよう殺意, Samayō Satsui); 51. "The Fire of Farewell" (訣別の火, Ketsubetsu no Hi); 52. "Departing for Reunion" (再会への旅立ち, Saikai e no Tabidachi); 53. "The Third Sunrise" (三度目の日の出, Mitabime no Hinode); 54. "Echoes" (残響, Zankyō)
7	June 15, 2018	978-4-06-511410-0	October 9, 2018	978-1-63236-683-2
55. "Days of Boredom" (退屈な日々, Taikutsuna Hibi); 56. "Obsession Reborn" (転生する愛執, Tensei suru Aishū); 57. "Poisonous Teachings" (毒となる教え, Doku to naru Oshie); 58. "The Left Hand of Vengeance" (仇なす左手, Adanasu Hidarite); 59. "Beating Will" (鼓動する遺言, Kodō suru Yuigon); 60. "Fate of a Long-Held Dream" (宿願の行き先, Shukugan no Ikisaki); 61. "Companions" (同朋, Dōhō); 62. "The Awaited One" (待ち望まれた者, Machinozoma reta Mono); 63. "The Merry Prince" (愉快な王子, Yukaina Ōji); 64. "The Young Man Who Can See" (視える青年, Mi eru Seinen)
8	September 14, 2018	978-4-06-512231-0	December 18, 2018	978-1-63236-684-9
65. "A Warm Welcome" (歓待, Kantai); 66. "Life in the Castle" (城での生活, Shiro de no Seikatsu); 67. "Expedition of the Holy One" (聖者の遠征, Seija no Ensei); 68. "Inversion" (転動, Utate dō); 69. "The Silent Vow" (無言の誓い, Mugon no Chikai); 70. "The Course of Good Luck" (幸運のゆくえ, Kōun no Yukue); 71. "The Heretics" (異端の徒, Itan no To); 72. "Glimmer of Hope" (希望の閃輝, Kibō no Senki); 73. "Scales of the Foolish" (愚者の秤, Gusha no Hakari); 74. "Will of the Flesh" (肉の意志, Niku no Ishi)
9	December 17, 2018	978-4-06-513396-5	April 23, 2019	978-1-63236-734-1
75. "Punishment and Pardon" (罰とゆるし, Batsu to Yurushi); 76. "Beyond the Dream" (夢の先, Yume no Saki); 77. "Fantasy and Reality" (仮想と現, Kasō to Gen); 78. "The Curtain Pulled Back" (剥がされたとばり, Hagasa reta to bari); 79. "The Black Flames of War" (黒い戦火, Kuroi Senka); 80. "A Tireless Enemy" (底知れぬ敵, Sokoshirenu Teki); 81. "Spreading Consciousness" (拡がる意識, Hirogaru Ishiki); 82. "Bet on the Future" (未来への賭け, Mirai e no Kake); 83. "Control" (支配, Shihai); 84. "Resonance" (共鳴, Kyōmei)
10	April 17, 2019	978-4-06-514449-7	July 26, 2019	978-1-63236-733-4
85. "To New Territory" (新領域へ, Shinryōiki e); 86. "Selection of Souls" (魂の選別, Tamashii no Senbetsu); 87. "The Value of Flesh" (肉の価値, Niku no Kachi); 88. "A Soldier's Qualifications" (兵士としての資格, Heishi toshite no Shikaku); 89. "What the Veil Hides" (ベールが秘めるもの, Bēru ga Himeru Mono); 90. "Devotion That Echoes in the Drains" (暗渠に響く献身, Ankyo ni Hibiku Kenshin); 91. "The Wise Man's True Identity" (賢者の正体, Kenja no Shōtai); 92. "Staked Reputation" (賭けられた信望, Kakerareta Shinbō); 93. "Where the Ship Is Headed" (船の行く末, Fune no Yukusue); 94. "Morning of Rebirth" (再生の朝, Saisei no Asa)
11	August 16, 2019	978-4-06-515316-1	December 17, 2019	978-1-63236-798-3
95. "Absolute Territory" (絶対の領域, Zettai no Ryōiki); 96. "Corrupter" (蝕む者, Mushibamu mono); 97. "Eroding Self" (摩耗する自我, Mamō suru Jiga); 98. "The Three Warriors" (三人の戦士, San'nin no Senshi); 99. "Memories of the Butchered" (肉片の記憶, Nikuhen no Kioku); 100. "The Immortal Army" (不滅の軍団, Fumetsu no Gundan); 101. "Rope of Life" (命の綱, Inochi no Tsuna); 102. "A Line Crossed" (越えられた一線, Koe rareta Issen); 103. "What You Wish to Protect" (守りたいもの, Mamoritaimono); 104. "This" (これ, Kore); 105. "Setting Sun" (落陽, Rakuyō); 106. "Death of the Immortal" (不死身の死, Fujimi no Shi)
12	January 17, 2020	978-4-06-517663-4	June 2, 2020 (digital); September 1, 2020 (print)	978-1-63236-799-0
107. "A Mother's Battle" (母の戦い, Haha no Tatakai); 108. "Quickening" (胎道, Taidō); 109. "Empty Cradle" (虚ろなゆりかご, Utsurona yuri Kago); 110. "The Price of a Vessel" (器の対価, Utsuwa no Taika); 111. "Daybreak" (黎明, Reimei); 112. "Then, Sunrise" (そして日の出へ, Soshite Hinode e); 113. "Reversal" (逆回転, Gyaku Kaiten); 114. "Dust and Demigods" (塵と半神, Chiri to Hanshin); 115. "Feast for the Resurrected" (復活者の宴, Fukkatsu-sha no Utage); 116. "End of an Era" (時代の終わり, Jidai no Owari)
13	July 17, 2020	978-4-06-519308-2	December 8, 2020	978-1-63236-927-7
117. "Peaceful World" (穏やかなる世, Odayakanaru Yo); 118. "Reins" (手綱, Tadzuna); 119. "New Encounter" (あたらしいであい, Atarashī Deai); 120. "Path of the Outsider" (いぶんしのゆくえ, Ibunshi no Yukue); 121. "Long-Sought Home" (いたるすみか, Itaru Sumika); 122. "Bound Hearts" (こころのむすびめ, Kokoro no Musubi-me); 123. "Guide" (みちしるべ, Michishirube); 124. "Mizuha" (みずは)
14	December 17, 2020	978-4-06-521479-4	June 22, 2021	978-1-64651-008-5
125. "Secret Base" (ひみつきち, Himitsu Kichi); 126. "The One Who Vanished" (いなくなったひと, Inaku natta Hito); 127. "Where He Is" (かれのいるばしょ, Kare no Iru Basho); 128. "The Battle Continues" (たたかいのつづき, Tatakai no Tsudzuki); 129. "Words That Don't Reach" (とどかぬことば, Todokanu Kotoba); 130. "Proof of Peace" (へいわのしょうめい, Heiwa no Shōmei); 131. "Alongside Peace" (へいわとともに, Heiwa to Tomoni); 132. "Contract for Love" (あいのけいやく, Ai no Keiyaku)
15	April 15, 2021	978-4-06-522887-6	September 28, 2021	978-1-64651-227-0
133. "Record: Hirotoshi" (きろく：ひろとし, Kiroku: Hirotoshi); 134. "Attack" (しゅうげき, Shūgeki); 135. "Trouble" (やっかいごと, Yakkai-goto); 136. "Rejected Life" (こばむいのち, Kobamu Inochi); 137. "A Say" (せんたくけん, Sentaku-ken); 138. "Enemy's Den" (てきのすみか, Teki no Sumika)
16	August 17, 2021	978-4-06-524555-2	January 25, 2022	978-1-64651-312-3
139. "Making Up" (なかなおり, Nakanaori); 140. "Acting Human" (ひとのふり, Hito no Furi); 141. "Their Home" (かれらのいえ, Kare ra no Ie); 142. "Chasing Dreams" (かけていくゆめ, Kake te Iku Yume); 143. "Binding Mud" (むすぶつち, Musubutsu Chi); 144. "Flying Bug" (とぶむし, Tobu Mushi); 145. "Meddling" (せわやき, Sewa Yaki); 146. "Number One" (いちばん, Ichiban)
17	February 17, 2022	978-4-06-526901-5	July 26, 2022	978-1-64651-415-1
147. "Return to the Present" (いまにかえる, Ima ni Kaeru); 148. "Where One Belongs" (いるべきばしょ, Irubeki Basho); 149. "The Path" (みちなり, Michinar); 150. "Independence" (ひとりだち, Hitorida Chi); 151. "What Connects Us" (つなぐもの, Tsunagu Mono); 152. "Something Grotesque" (いぎょうのもの, Igyou no Mono); 153. "Invisible Battle" (みえぬたたかい, Mienu Tatakai)
18	September 16, 2022	978-4-06-529131-3	April 11, 2023	978-1-64651-416-8
154. "Arrows United" (つどうゆみや, Tsudō Yumiya); 155. "Trusting Heart" (しんじるこころ, Shinjiru Kokoro); 156. "Clean Water" (きれいなみず, Kireina Mizu); 157. "Cleaning Up" (しんようのあとかたづけ, Shin-yō no Ato Katadzuke); 158. "House of Hope" (きぼうのいえ, Kibō no Ie)
19	February 17, 2023	978-4-06-530626-0	December 5, 2023	978-1-64651-609-4
159. "Proof of Peace" (へいわのあかし, Heiwa no Akashi); 160. "Coexistence" (きょうぞん, Kyōzon); 161. "Independence" (じりつ, Jiritsu); 162. "Right Here, Like This" (このままここで, Kono Mama Koko de); 163. "What Was Born" (うまれたもの, Uma Reta Mono); 164. "To You, Fushi" (フシへ, Fushi e); 165. "A New Time" (新しい時, Atarashī Toki)
20	August 17, 2023	978-4-06-532192-8	July 2, 2024	978-1-64651-732-9
166. "Age of Wishes" (願いの時代, Negai no Jidai); 167. "The Road to Your Dreams" (夢への道, Yume e no Michi); 168. "The Possibilities of a Doll" (人形の可能性, Ningyō no Kanōsei); 169. "People's Choices" (人の選択, Hito no Sentaku); 170. "Recovery Operation" (回収作戦, Kaishū Sakusen); 171. "At the Ends of Power" (力の行き先, Chikara no Ikisaki)
21	January 17, 2024	978-4-06-534185-8	November 19, 2024	979-8-88877-309-3
172. "Utopia" (理想郷, Risōkyō); 173. "Corral Trap" (囲い罠, Kakoi Wana); 174. "The Doll's Secret?" (人形の秘密？, Ningyō no Himitsu?); 175. "A Perfect Plan" (完璧な作戦, Kanpekina Sakusen); 176. "His Motives, Part 1" (彼の思惑, Kare no Omowaku); 177. "His Motives, Part 2" (彼の思惑 下, Kare no Omowaku ka); 178. "Escape" (逃避行, Tōhikō)
22	June 17, 2024	978-4-06-535784-2	April 22, 2025	979-8-88877-462-5
179. "The Lacking Boy" (欠けた少年, Kaketa Shōnen); 180. "Capturing Love" (捕らえる愛, Toraeru Ai); 181. "Mutual Deception" (化かし合い, Bakashi Ai); 182. "Operation Crab" (カニ計画, Kani Keikaku); 183. "Anton Day" (アントン・デイ, Anton Dei); 184. "Within the Secrets" (秘密の内側, Himitsu no Uchigawa)
23	November 15, 2024	978-4-06-537434-4	October 21, 2025	979-8-88877-563-9
185. Ne o Tadotte (根を辿って); 186. Ikiru Shibito (生きる死人); 187. Ikiru Shibito 2 (生きる死人 2); 188. Ikiru Shibito 3 (生きる死人 3)
24	April 16, 2025	978-4-06-539095-5	April 14, 2026	979-8-88877-681-0
189. Ningyō no Shōtai (人形の正体); 190. Kanojo no Hanashi (彼女のはなし); 191. Nan no Tame? Dare no Tame? (なんのため？ だれのため？); 192. Sonri Tokoro o Motomete (存り処を求めて); 193. Shitte Hoshikatta Koto (知ってほしかったこと); 194. Nono to Shiren (ノノと試練); 195. (―――)
25	August 12, 2025	978-4-06-540005-0	October 13, 2026	979-8-88877-866-1
196. Mezameru Honshin (目覚める本心); 197. Rakka (落花); 198. Ketsudan (決断); 199. Shiro no Sekai (白の世界); 200. Futari no Kaeru Basho (ふたりの還る場所); 201. Saisho no Hitori (最初のひとり)
