= Ishida (disambiguation) =

Ishida is a Japanese surname.

Ishida may also refer to:

== Places ==
- Ishida, Gifu, former village that existed for the year 1874 only, now part of Kakamigahara
- Ishida, Nagasaki, former town merged with its neighbors to form the city of Iki in 2004
- Ishida Station (disambiguation), several railway stations

== Other ==
- Ishida (company), manufacturer of packing line equipment
- Ishida (shogi), a type of opening in shogi
