= Ishida =

- Pronunciation: Ishida

Origin
- Origin: Japanese
- Meaning: stone ricefield
- Region of origin: Japanese

Ishida (written: 石田; lit. 'stone ricefield') is a Japanese surname. The name is sometimes romanized as Isida. Notable people with the surname include:

- Akira Ishida (石田 彰; born 1967), Japanese voice actor
- Ayumi Ishida (actress) (いしだ あゆみ; born 1948), actress and singer
- Ayumi Ishida (singer) (石田 亜佑美; born 1997), Japanese singer
- Chiho Ishida (石田 千穂; born 2002), Japanese idol and singer
- Ishida Hakyō (石田波郷; 1913–1969), Japanese poet and writer
- Haruka Ishida (石田 晴香; born 1993), Japanese idol, singer, actress and voice actress
- Hikari Ishida (石田ひかり; born 1972), Japanese actress
- Issei Ishida (いしだ 壱成; born 1974), Japanese actor and musician
- Junichi Ishida (石田 純一; born 1954), Japanese actor and television personality
- Kazuharu Ishida (石田 和春; born 1948), Japanese sport wrestler
- Kichizo Ishida (石田 吉蔵; c. 1894 – 1936), killed by Sada Abe
- Kiyomi Ishida (石田 清美; born 1968), Japanese table tennis player
- Kyoko Ishida (石田 京子; born 1960), Japanese volleyball player
- Masatoshi Ishida (disambiguation), multiple people
- Miku Ishida (石田 未来; born 1988), Japanese idol
- Mitsuhiro Ishida, Japanese mixed martial artist
- Ishida Mitsunari (石田 三成; 1560–1600), Japanese samurai
- Naohiro Ishida (石田 直裕; born 1988), Japanese shogi player
- Nobuhiro Ishida (石田 順裕, born 1975), Japanese boxer
- Noritoshi Ishida (石田 祝稔; born 1951), Japanese politician
- Ryotaro Ishida (石田 凌太郎; born 2001), Japanese footballer
- Sui Ishida (石田 スイ), Japanese manga artist
- Taro Ishida (石田 太郎 (born 1944), Japanese voice actor
- Tatsuya Ishida, Japanese webcomic author
- Tetsuya Ishida (石田 徹也; 1973-2005), Japanese visual artist
- Tsunenobu Ishida (石田 恒信; 1905–?), Japanese swimmer
- Yoshio Ishida, Japanese Go player
- Yoshihisa Ishida (born 1944), Japanese shot putter and hammer thrower
- Yuki Ishida (石田 祐樹; born 1980), Japanese footballer
- Yuki Ishida (wrestler) (石田 有輝; born 1999), Japanese professional wrestler
- Yuriko Ishida (石田 ゆり子; born 1969), Japanese actress

== Fictional characters ==
- Mari Ishida (イシダ マリ), a supporting character in Solo Leveling
- Shoya (石田 将也) and Miyako Ishida (石田 美也子), major characters in A Silent Voice
- Uryū Ishida (石田 雨竜), a main character in Bleach
