= Masatoshi =

- Gender: Male

Origin
- Origin: Japanese
- Meaning: Different meanings depending on the kanji used

Masatoshi (written: 正俊, 正敏, 正利, 昌俊, 昌利, 雅俊, 雅敏, 雅功, 雅年, 真敏, 真利, 政敏, 政利 or 允俊) is a masculine Japanese given name. Notable people with the name include:

- Masatoshi Abe (阿部 正俊; 1942–2020), Japanese politician
- Masatoshi Akihara (秋原 正俊), Japanese film director
- Masatoshi Akimoto (秋本 真利; born 1975), Japanese politician
- Masatoshi Hamada (浜田 雅功; born 1963), Japanese comedian
- Hoshina Masatoshi (保科 正俊; 1509–1593), Japanese samurai
- Hotta Masatoshi (堀田 正俊; 1634–1684), Japanese daimyō
- Masatoshi Ichikawa (市川 雅敏; born 1961), Japanese cyclist
- Ikoma Masatoshi (生駒 正俊; 1586–1621), Japanese samurai and daimyō
- Masatoshi Ishida (disambiguation), multiple people
- Masatoshi Ito (伊藤 雅俊; 1924–2023), Japanese businessman
- Masatoshi Kawahara (川原 正敏; born 1960), Japanese manga artist
- Masatoshi Koshiba (小柴 昌俊; 1926–2020), Japanese physicist
- Masatoshi Kushibiki (櫛引 政敏; born 1993), Japanese footballer
- Masatoshi Kurata (倉田 雅年; born 1939), Japanese politician
- Masatoshi Mashima (真島 昌利; born 1962), Japanese guitarist
- Masatoshi Matsuda (松田 正俊; born 1980), Japanese footballer
- Masatoshi Mihara (三原 雅俊; born 1988), Japanese footballer
- Masatoshi Mizutani (水谷 允俊; born 1987), Japanese footballer
- Masatoshi Muto (武藤 正敏; born 1948), Japanese diplomat
- Masatoshi Nagase (永瀬 正敏; born 1966), Japanese actor
- Masatoshi Nagatomi (1926–2000), Japanese professor of Buddhist studies at Harvard University
- Masatoshi Naitō (内藤 正敏; born 1938), Japanese photographer
- Masatoshi Nakamura (中村 雅俊; born 1951), Japanese actor and singer
- Masatoshi Nakayama (中山 正敏; 1913–1987), Japanese karateka
- Masatoshi Nei (根井 正利; born 1931), Japanese scientist
- Masatoshi Ōkōchi (大河内 正敏; 1878–1952), Japanese physicist
- Masatoshi Ono (小野 正利; born 1967), Japanese singer-songwriter
- Masatoshi Sakai (酒井政利, died 2021), record producer
- Masatoshi Sanma (三馬 正敏; born 1977), Japanese slalom canoeist
- Masatoshi Shima (嶋 正利; born 1943), Japanese electronics engineer
- Masatoshi Shimizu (清水 正俊; born 1948), Japanese rower
- Masatoshi Shinomaki (篠巻 政利; born 1946), Japanese judoka
- Masatoshi Suto (須藤 正敏; born 1945), Japanese Nordic combined skier
- Masatoshi Takeichi (竹市 雅俊; born 1943), Japanese biologist
- Masatoshi Toyota (豊田 雅俊; born 1976), Japanese sport wrestler
- Usune Masatoshi (うすね 正俊; born 1961), Japanese manga artist
- Masatoshi Wakabayashi (若林 正俊; born 1934), Japanese politician
- Masatoshi Yoshino (吉野 正敏; 1928–2017), Japanese physical geographer and climatologist
- Masatoshi Gündüz Ikeda (池田 正敏 ギュンドゥズ; 1926-2003) a Turkish Mathematician of Japanese ancestry

== See also ==
- 31671 Masatoshi, a main-belt asteroid
