= Tsunenobu =

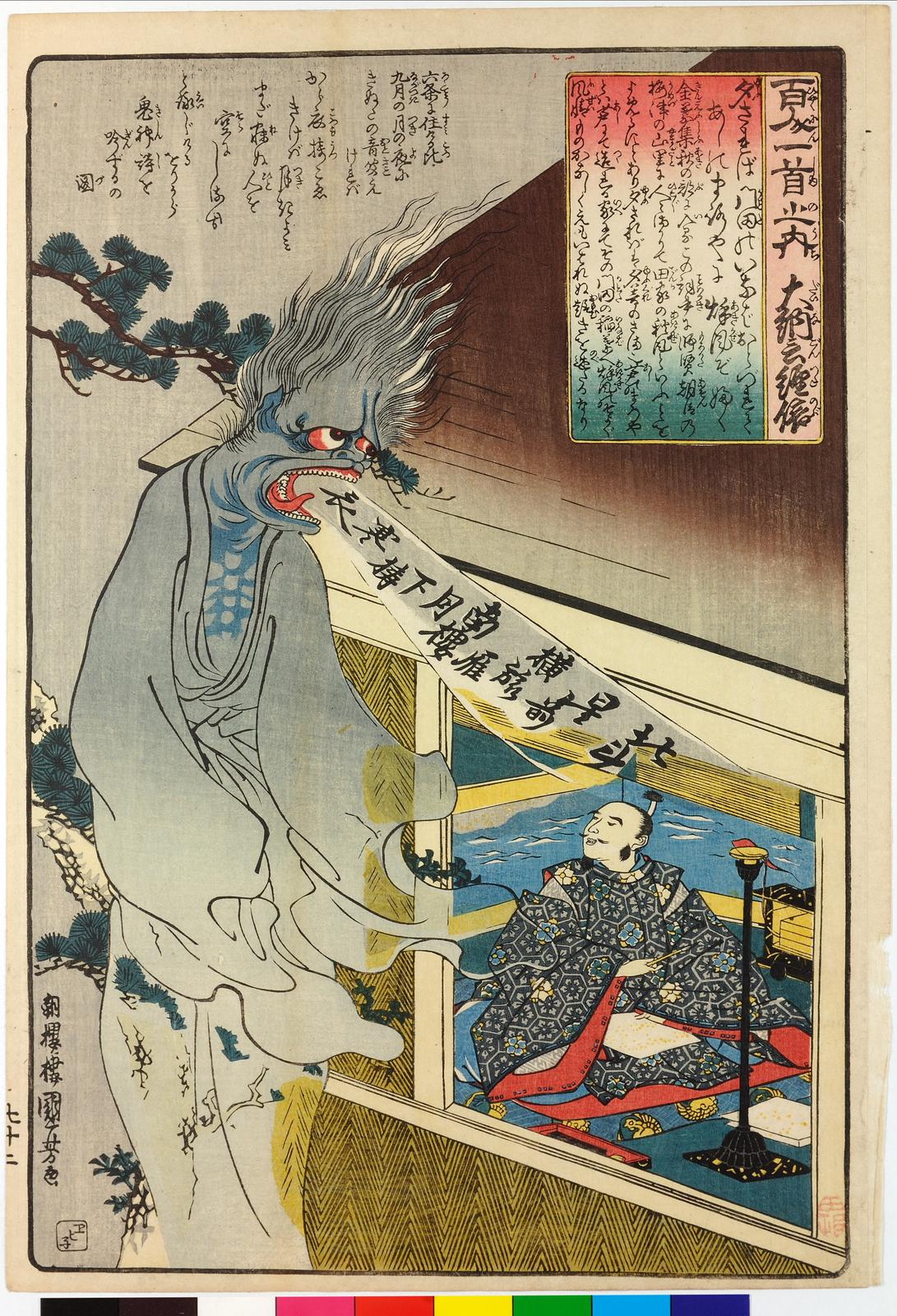
- Tsunenobu Minamoto (1016–1097), Japanese nobleman and poet
- Pronunciation: tsɯnenobɯ (IPA)
- Gender: Male

Origin
- Origin: Japanese
- Meaning: Different meanings depending on the kanji used

Other names
- Alternative spelling: Tunenobu (Kunrei-shiki) Tunenobu (Nihon-shiki) Tsunenobu (Hepburn)

Tsunenobu is a masculine Japanese given name.

== Written forms ==
Tsunenobu can be written using different combinations of kanji characters. Here are some examples:

- 常信, "usual, believe"
- 常伸, "usual, extend"
- 常延, "usual, extend"
- 常宣, "usual, announce"
- 恒信, "always, believe"
- 恒伸, "always, extend"
- 恒延, "always, extend"
- 恒宣, "always, announce"
- 庸信, "common, believe"
- 庸伸, "common, extend"
- 庸延, "common, extend"
- 庸宣, "common, announce"
- 毎信, "every, believe"
- 毎伸, "every, extend"
- 毎延, "every, extend"

The name can also be written in hiragana つねのぶ or katakana ツネノブ.

== Notable people with the name ==
- Tsunenobu Ishida (石田 恒信; 1905–1991), Japanese swimmer.
- Tsunenobu Kano (狩野 常信; 1636–1713), Japanese painter.
- Tsunenobu Minamoto (源 経信; 1016–1097), Japanese nobleman and poet.
