= To Your Eternity =

Japanese manga series and its adaptations

- First tankōbon volume cover, featuring Fushi as Joaan (front) and the Nameless Boy (back)

不滅のあなたへ (Fumetsu no Anata e)
- Genre: Drama; Fantasy
- Manga
- Written by: Yoshitoki Ōima
- Published by: Kodansha
- English publisher: NA: Kodansha USA
- Imprint: Shōnen Magazine Comics
- Magazine: Weekly Shōnen Magazine
- Original run: November 9, 2016 – June 4, 2025
- Volumes: 25
- Anime television series
- Directed by: Masahiko Murata (S1); Kiyoko Sayama (Note: Credited as chief director (総監督, sō kantoku) for the third season) (S2 & 3); Sōta Yokote (S3)
- Produced by: Aya Ishii (S1); Yuri Katō (S2); Yukiko Yagi (S3); Takaya Yamaguchi (S3)
- Written by: Shinzō Fujita
- Music by: Ryo Kawasaki
- Studio: Brain's Base (S1); Drive (S2 & 3); Studio Massket (S3)
- Licensed by: Crunchyroll: SA/SEA: Medialink
- Original network: NHK Educational TV (S1 & 2); NHK General TV (S3)
- English network: US: Crunchyroll Channel
- Original run: April 12, 2021 – March 28, 2026
- Episodes: 62
- icon

To Your Eternity (Japanese: 不滅のあなたへ, Hepburn: Fumetsu no Anata e; lit. 'To You, the Immortal') is a Japanese manga series written and illustrated by Yoshitoki Ōima. It was serialized in Kodansha's shōnen manga magazine Weekly Shōnen Magazine from November 2016 to June 2025, with its chapters collected in 25 tankōbon volumes. The story is about an immortal being, Fushi, who takes on multiple forms and freely utilizes their respective natural abilities at will, including that of an abandoned white-haired boy and his white wolf, in order to further evolve and stimulate as it learns what it means to be truly human over the decades and centuries.

Ōima, inspired by her own grandmother's death, aimed to write about survival and the character Fushi, who initially is an emotionless stone but gradually develops a self and personality as a result of interacting with humans. In contrast to her previous work, A Silent Voice, To Your Eternity puts little focus on the characters' past but instead upon their future.

In North America, the manga is licensed by Kodansha USA for a digital and printed English release. An anime television series adaptation produced by Brain's Base aired from April to August 2021. A second season produced by Drive aired from October 2022 to March 2023. A third season produced by Drive and Studio Massket aired from October 2025 to March 2026.

To Your Eternity has received acclaim in Japan, earning many awards and generating major sales. Critical response to the series' debut was very positive, based on the emotional focus on the villagers and Fushi, to the point of often earning perfect scores. Fushi's continuous character arc was praised, while Ōima's artistry enjoyed critical acclaim due to its detailed facial expressions and environments.

== Plot ==
=== Part One ===
A mysterious being, the Beholder, creates a white orb later named Fushi by a spirited girl. Initially a rock, Fushi takes the form of a dying arctic wolf and meets a lonely boy who mistakes him for his lost pet. After the boy's death, Fushi adopts his form and travels to Ninannah, where he encounters March, a girl destined as a sacrifice to a monstrous bear, Oniguma. March teaches him language and names him. Upon defeating Oniguma, Fushi, March, her protector Parona, and the elder Pioran are captured by the warrior Hayase. Though they escape, March dies shielding Parona, her spirit lingering. Fushi flees Ninannah, evading Hayase's pursuit.

With Pioran, Fushi learns speech. En route to Takunaha, they battle a Nokker—a parasitic entity that steals his forms—but reclaim what was lost. There, he befriends Gugu, a disfigured boy who sacrifices himself for Rean, who then becomes a spirit. For four years, Fushi lives as a human until Gugu's death forces him to leave. Hayase manipulates Tonari into luring Fushi onto a prison ship bound for Jananda Island. In gladiatorial combat, Hayase reveals she murdered Parona and impersonated her, infuriating Fushi. Overpowered, Fushi is saved by Tonari's intervention. When Nokkers attack, killing Tonari's allies, Fushi destroys them and abandons Hayase at sea. Reuniting with Pioran, he retreats to an island where her dementia worsens. Before dying, she asks the Beholder to reincarnate as something useful—returning as a horse.

For forty years, Fushi isolates himself until Nokkers target humans again. He meets Hisame, Hayase's reincarnated granddaughter, whose arm harbors a Nokker. After clashing with the now-adult Tonari, Hisame flees. Tonari dies, joining Fushi's spirits. Over centuries, he avoids humanity, but Hayase's descendants—like Kahaku—pursue him, forming the Guardian Force, a cult opposing Nokkers.

Captured by Prince Bonchien, Fushi is coerced into demonstrating resurrection. After escaping, he and Bon prepare for a Nokker assault on Renril. Disguised as Booze Man, Fushi reshapes the city, reviving March accidentally. Three allies die, but Bon reveals they can be restored. When Kahaku's Nokker overwhelms Fushi, Bon sacrifices himself, allowing Fushi to regain strength. Reviving his allies, Fushi secures victory. Kahaku later takes his own life, confessing his devotion.

=== Part Two ===
Fushi vows to create a peaceful world and resurrect his fallen companions before entering a centuries-long slumber, his essence spreading across the planet to suppress the Nokkers. Unbeknownst to him, the Nokkers survive by evolving into microscopic parasites, hiding within human hosts. The one that once possessed Kahaku now lurks within Mizuha, the eighteenth reincarnation of Hayase, secretly rallying the remaining Nokkers for Fushi's eventual return.

Awakening in the modern era, Fushi revives his eleven spirit companions—March, Gugu, Tonari, Bonchien, and others. The Beholder appears as a boy named Satoru, while Fushi crosses paths with a teenager, Yuki, and Mizuha, who—as Hayase's latest incarnation—becomes obsessed with him. When Mizuha kills her mother, only for the woman to inexplicably revive, Fushi realizes the Nokkers never vanished—they have integrated into humanity. Torn between eradication and coexistence, his hesitation allows Hayase's Nokker to retaliate, attacking Yuki's school.

Though Fushi destroys Hayase's Nokker and dismantles its network, others remain hidden in society. Satoru offers him omnipotence, but Fushi refuses. Before erasing his own memories, Satoru reveals he created the world out of boredom, longing to perish within it—and now entrusts Fushi as its eternal guardian.

Six decades later, with Nokkers widely known and Yuki gone, Fushi leaves with his resurrected friends, continuing his timeless watch.

== Characters ==
Fushi (フシ)

Voiced by: Reiji Kawashima (Japanese); Jacob Hopkins (English)
A divine creature who can change his form and grow objects from his body. He was sent to Earth to preserve information and experiences. Through his journey he learns how to communicate with humans.
Nokkers (ノッカー)
Shapeshifting and parasitic entities that attempt to thwart the Beholder and Fushi's purpose in preserving all that exists. They are recurring antagonists throughout the series, one of which actually merges with the human Hayase, and continues to have some power over her many reincarnations/descendants over the centuries.
The Nameless Boy
A young and lonely unnamed boy and the very first human being Fushi meets in the form of his good longtime wolf friend Joaan. After he dies, Fushi takes his form, often using it as a default appearance.
March (マーチ, Māchi)
Voiced by: Rie Hikisaka (Japanese); Sarah Anne Williams (English)
A young girl who adopts Fushi after escaping from a sacrifice ritual.
Parona (パロナ)
Voiced by: Aya Uchida (Japanese); Valeria Rodriguez (English)
An exiled villager; a friend and older sister figure to March.
Pioran (ピオラン)
Voiced by: Rikako Aikawa (Japanese); Dorothy Elias-Fahn (English)
An elderly woman who takes care of Fushi. She ultimately dies of old age and is reborn as a horse who aids Fushi over the decades as per her dying request.
Hayase (ハヤセ)
Voiced by: Mitsuki Saiga (Japanese); Kira Buckland (English)
A warrior who tries to sacrifice young March and later killed her. She takes an obsessive interest in Fushi and his ever-developing otherworldly abilities. She served as a primary antagonist for the first few arcs of the manga, and first season of the anime. Her descendants and reincarnations then entirely devote themselves to protecting Fushi in her stead and intend to carry on her twisted bloodline for future generations as devoted cult-like unit called the Guardians.
Gugu (グーグー)
Voiced by: Ryoko Shiraishi (child), Taku Yashiro (adolescent) (Japanese); Erica Mendez (child), Bryce Papenbrook (adolescent) (English)
A young man who works in Booze Man's restaurant after being treated by the latter when he was nearly dying and thus covers his damaged face with a mask.
Shin (シン)
Voiced by: Atsushi Abe
Gugu's older brother who abandoned him.
Rean (リーン, Rīn)
Voiced by: Manaka Iwami
A wealthy young girl who frequents Booze's store as she befriends Gugu and Fushi.
Booze Man (酒爺, Sake Jī)
Voiced by: Kentarō Tone
The owner of a distillery and friend of Pioran.
Tonari (トナリ)
Voiced by: Eri Inagawa (Japanese); Anne Yatco (English)
A young girl who accompanied her father when he was exiled to Janada, an island for criminals.
Hisame (ヒサメ)
Voiced by: Tomori Kusunoki (Japanese); Dawn M. Bennett (English)
Hayase's granddaughter and the leader of a group called Guardians, who seek to protect Fushi.
Kahaku (カハク)
Voiced by: Mitsuki Saiga (Japanese); Chris Hackney (English)
A distant male descendant of Hayase and current leader of the Guardians.
Bonchien Nicoli la Tasty Peach Uralis (ボンシェン・ニコリ・ラ・テイスティピーチ=ウラリス, Bonshen Nikori Ra Teisutipīchi Urarisu)
Voiced by: Takehito Koyasu
An extremely eccentric prince of the Uralis Kingdom, who seeks to capture and get close to Fushi.
Torta (トルタ, Toruta)
Voiced by: Megumi Han
Bonchien's little brother.
Pocoa (ポコア, Pokoa)
Voiced by: Aoi Koga
Bonchien's little sister.
Fen (フェン)
Voiced by: Mitsuaki Kanuka
One of Bonchien's ghost confidantes.
Nixon (ニクソン, Nikuson)
Voiced by: Hiroyuki Yoshino
One of Bonchien's ghost confidantes.
Todo (アイリス, Airisu)
Voiced by: Akeno Watanabe
Bon's love interest.
Cylira (サイリーラ, Sairīra)
Voiced by: Mitsuru Miyamoto
The head of the Church of Bennett, a religious organization opposing Fushi, believing him to actually cause the conflict with Nokkers.
Kai Renald Rawle (カイ・レナルド・ロウル, Kai Renarudo Rouru)
Voiced by: Yasuyuki Kase
An experienced soldier in the Uralis army.
Hairo Rich (ハイロ・リッチ, Hairo Ritchi)
Voiced by: Kaito Ishikawa
A skilled soldier and a member of the Church of Bennett.
Messar Robin Bastar (メサール・ロビン・バスタル, Mesāru Robin Basutaru)
Voiced by: Eiji Miyashita
A mysanthrope soldier, who is secretly a prince of Renril.
Alme (アルメ, Arume)
Voiced by: Noriko Shitaya
The princess of Renril and acting queen, Messar's half-sister.
Iddy (エコ, Eko)
Voiced by: Ryō Hirohashi
A mute little girl from a distant village, where people use vases to communicate, who Fushi takes in.
Cam (カム, Kamu)
Voiced by: Fukushi Ochiai
A chubby and cheerful soldier of Renril, who is attracted to Yuiss.
Yuiss (ユイス, Yuisu)
Voiced by: Akira Sekine
A stoick archer in Renril's army.
Sera (セラ)
Voiced by: Ayaka Fukuhara
Sebas (セバス, Sebasu)
Voiced by: Chiharu Sawashiro
Satoru (サトル)
Voiced by: Yumiri Hanamori
Mizuha (ミズハ)
Voiced by: Tomori Kusunoki
Yūki Aoki (アオキユーキ, Aoki Yūki)
Voiced by: Megumi Han
Hanna (ハンナ)
Voiced by: Aya Uchida
Kazumu Tamaki (タマキカズム, Tamaki Kazumu)
Voiced by: Fukushi Ochiai
Suzuhiko Senba (センバスズヒコ, Senba Suzuhiko)
Voiced by: Chiharu Sawashiro
Aiko (アイコ)
Voiced by: Aoi Koga
Kazumitsu (カズミツ)
Voiced by: Shouto Kashii
Izumi (イズミ)
Voiced by: Shizuka Itō
Itsuki (イツキ)
Voiced by: Shin-ichiro Miki
Mimori (みもり)
Voiced by: Rumi Okubo
Hirotoshi (ひろとし)
Voiced by: Tasuku Hatanaka
Saki (サキ)
Voiced by: Hikaru Tono
Fūna (フウナ)
Voiced by: Riko Aono
Nagisa (ナギサ)
Voiced by: Yui Kondo
Kasabe (カサベ)
Voiced by: Sachi Kokuryū
The Beholder (観察者, Kansatsu-sha)
Voiced by: Kenjiro Tsuda (Japanese); Cory Yee (English)
The narrator and Fushi's creator who threw Fushi, as the Orb, to Earth in the series' beginning to observe it as it further changes form and acquires more and stimulation. He ultimately makes the choice to abandon his creation and have his own fey/vital spiritual essence reborn as a young human boy named Satoru.

== Production ==
Manga artist Yoshitoki Ōima conceived the title To Your Eternity after learning that her sick grandmother was going to pass away. At the outset, she was only certain of the title's nuance, but could not arrive at a decision. With the encouragement of colleagues, she eventually chose To Your Eternity. The decision to give the manga a fantasy setting was taken for the freedom it afforded, with supernatural beings offering unusual possibilities. She compares To Your Eternity to her other works, and states that, while A Silent Voice focuses on characters in the present confronting their past, To Your Eternity focuses on the future. She also mentions exploring the theme of death in Mardock Scramble, A Silent Voice and To Your Eternity. The character Fushi originated from Ōima's work in primary school, although the setting changed before the series started. Fushi was originally to be female, but a colleague suggested a male protagonist for a different appeal. Ōima wanted to make the protagonist neutral, and said she prefers neutral female characters. Each volume cover represents a character's dream such as the first one, which depicts the unnamed youth finding freedom. According to Oima, Fushi does not want to forget the people he meets on his journeys.

Characters featured in the series are based on real life personalities. For example, Pioran reminded Ōima of her deceased grandmother. She furthermore expresses some guilt for having characters die. There are approximately 13 characters that are greatly affected by Fushi and which, before the series' beginning, would lead Ōima to the title, "Ash Swords of 13 People" (『13人の灰剣』), before being replaced by "To Your Eternity". When it came to drawing, March was Ōima's favorite character due to her short stature. Furthermore, Ōima says she likes drawing children in confined places.

The overall setting is that of a main character being "a boy who knows nothing". Ōima wanted the reader to find themself, like Fushi, in this situation where they do not know anything. It is for this reason that she did not give prominence to any character other than the hero. A common theme portrayed in the manga is death and immortality. To reinforce the blank slate themes, she decided to create a white universe, which was how she obtained a snowy landscape. As characters living in this snowy region are not part of an indigenous population, she decided not to depict them as, for example, Inuit. For research, she watched several documentaries in order to learn how to make the boy look like he was living in a world of "survival", with limited resources and skills. To accomplish this, she had to think deeply about what was practical under such difficult circumstances. March was created to be talkative and balance the quiet ones. The manga presents the climate, disease and the polar bear as obstacles to the human will. Ōima elaborates that people have to live with these challenges, and it is to show how to overcome them that she included them in the scenes.

=== Adaptation ===
Director Masahiko Murata expressed surprise when first reading the manga series, initially believing the young villager would be the lead character rather than Fushi. He felt that the themes Ōima was approaching were thought-provoking, which he found challenging. Murata stated that, as minor parts of the manga were changed, the anime would stay true to the original printed version. The official Twitter account of the anime series stated that the main theme presented through March (and later Fushi) was the notion of growing into adulthood.

In casting the actors, Reiji Kawashima's voice quality was befitting for Fushi—from his point of view. "The Observer", played by Kenjiro Tsuda, is a narrative role that was not all that involved in the story due to Murata's view that Tsuda's voice was "cool". The first episode only had two voice actors: Kawashima and Tsuda. The former expressed relief when working as he felt that Tsuda was a friendly person. Tsuda felt that Kawashima was a passionate actor, exemplified by his early arrival for each episode's recording session. Kawashima thought his character to be exhausting based on his varied experiences, while Tsuda felt Fushi was too mysterious. Rie Hikisaka, who plays March, enjoyed Kawashima's work and his interactions with Pioran. For the sixth episode, Kawashima expressed difficulty portraying Fushi's lines due to the fact that the character was learning how to speak. Ryoko Shiraishi commented that while she enjoyed voicing Gugu, the character's fluid personality made the work more challenging.

== Media ==
=== Manga ===
Written and illustrated by Yoshitoki Ōima, To Your Eternity started in Kodansha's shōnen manga magazine Weekly Shōnen Magazine on November 9, 2016. It was Ōima's second series featured in the publication, the first being the critically acclaimed A Silent Voice. The series' first arc finished on December 4, 2019, while the second started on January 22, 2020. The series finished on June 4, 2025. Kodansha collected its chapters in 25 tankōbon volumes, released from January 17, 2017, to August 12, 2025.

On January 17, 2017, Kodansha USA announced that they would digitally publish the first ten chapters of the series on various digital platforms. Thereafter, they would publish the manga's new chapters simultaneously with the Japanese releases. The first printed volume in North America was released on October 31, 2017.

=== Anime ===
On January 8, 2020, Kodansha announced that the manga would receive an anime television series adaptation. It is animated by Brain's Base and directed by Masahiko Murata, with Shinzō Fujita handling series composition, Koji Yabuno designing the characters, and Ryo Kawasaki composing the music. Originally scheduled to premiere in October 2020, the series was delayed due to the COVID-19 pandemic, and eventually aired from April 12 to August 30, 2021, on NHK Educational TV, and ran for 20 episodes. Crunchyroll licensed the series for worldwide streaming outside of Asia. Medialink also acquired the series for streaming on Ani-One Asia's YouTube channel. The opening theme song is "Pink Blood", performed by Hikaru Utada, while the ending theme song is "Mediator", composed by Masashi Hamauzu.

Following the final episode of the first season, a second season was announced. Drive replaced Brain's Base in animating the second season, while Kiyoko Sayama replaced Masahiko Murata as director, with the rest of the main staff reprising their roles from the first season. The season aired from October 23, 2022, to March 12, 2023, and ran for 20 episodes. The opening theme song is "Pink Blood", performed by Hikaru Utada, reused with updated visuals in the opening credits to represent the new story arcs, while the ending theme song is "Roots", composed by Masashi Hamauzu.

Following the final episode of the second season, a third season was announced. Studio Massket is joining Drive to animate the third season, with Sōta Yokote directing and Sayama returning from the second season as chief director, with the rest of the staff and cast reprising their roles. The season aired from October 4, 2025, to March 28, 2026, on NHK General TV. The opening theme song is "Fumetsu no Anata" (ふめつのあなた; lit. 'Your Eternity'), performed by Perfume, while the ending theme song is composed by Masashi Hamauzu.

== Reception ==
=== Manga ===
The first collected volume of the series sold 29,288 copies, ranking 17 on the weekly Oricon manga chart. Its second volume ranked 34, selling 22,565 copies in its first week, while its third debuted at 41 with 20,445 copies sold.

The manga was nominated for the 11th edition of the Manga Taishō awards in 2018 and it managed to gain a total of 47 points. In 2018, Ōima won the Daruma de la Meilleure Nouvelle Série at the Japan Expo in Paris, France for To Your Eternity. In May 2019, it won the award for Best Shōnen Manga at the 43rd annual Kodansha Manga Awards, alongside The Quintessential Quintuplets. In both 2018 and 2019, Anime News Network listed it as one of the best series for young readers. The first five volumes were listed by the American Library Association as one of the best manga series written for a young audience in 2019.

The manga's narrative and setting have been praised by critics like Otaku USA due to its multiple fantasy and drama elements. However, he felt the story provided in the first volume lacked the emotional impact from the manga artist's previous work, A Silent Voice. Two reviewers from Anime News Network (ANN) and one from UK Anime Network gave the first volume perfect reviews, impressed by the narrative's depth in exploring the multiplicity of characters as well as how the first chapters handled the lonely youth who met Fushi in an Ice Age-like area. Two other writers from ANN wondered whether the new chapters would carry forward the emotional impact of the first. Anime UK News was engaged by the manga's first chapter based on the characterization of the unnamed villager rather than by Fushi. As the manga progressed, Fushi's character arc was the subject of praise as he was closer to acting like a human in contrast to his nearly emotionless introduction. As a result, writers felt the tone of the series was still tragic, thanks to the handling of this character. Manga News furthermore enjoyed the series' time-skips as Fushi's immortality allowed him to blend in with newer, more modern scenarios.

The critical response to the artwork was mostly positive. Anime UK News praised the way Ōima drew the pages, by giving the characters detailed features and the way its settings were presented. Similarly, Manga Mexico writer Tania Ávila praised the artwork—especially in the later chapters of the first volume. Fantasy Mundo noted that the drawings helped to further detail the characters and improve their emotional value. The Fandom Post felt that the artwork "is light on textures and right with detailed backgrounds once the story moves from the snowfields to the forest" and felt that the wildlife was often drawn strangely. UK Anime Network praised the way the backgrounds were detailed and how the author built the characters' emotions.

=== Anime ===
The anime adaptation also attracted positive reactions. IGN listed it among the best anime series of Spring 2021, directing readers to its portrayals of Earth's culture but refrained from further explaining the premise to avoid spoilers. In a Filmmarks survey, To Your Eternity was voted the ninth "Most Anticipated 2021 Spring Anime Ranking". In the website Anime Trendz, the series was often listed as one of the most popular series from 2021. In 2022, the series was awarded Best Drama and nominated for Best Fantasy at the 6th Crunchyroll Anime Awards; it was nominated again in Best Drama for its second season at the eighth edition in 2024. The series was also nominated in the Kids: Animation category at the 50th International Emmy Awards.

Three ANN writers gave the anime's premiere a perfect score, based on the emotional storytelling involving Fushi and the nameless youth, most notably when the latter, initially cheerful and talkative, quickly becomes filled with despair, as he cannot find any other people in the region. Similarly, The Fandom Post gave the series' premiere a perfect score despite having read the manga years before, based on the cast's performances and Utada Hikaru's theme song "Pink Blood" which helped to convey a moving story. James Beckett, from the same site, continued reviewing the anime and while still enjoying the anime, was afraid of it becoming too melodramatic. Comic Book Resources felt the adaptation series was well done and given an appealing soundtrack as the emotional scenes became stronger thanks to the music provided. Critics praised the bonding involving Fushi, March and Parona, noting how heroic they were for each other while providing opportunity for more entertaining scenes. However, March's death in the fifth episode was found to be heartbreaking. Fushi's increasing display of humanity was praised, with the sixth episode giving him enough screentime to become the sole main character. Fushi's fight with Oniguma was also listed as the seventh best anime fight from 2021 by Crunchyroll.

The prison arc, however, was panned by Anime News Network for lacking the appeal of previous arcs as well as the animation being poorly done.
