= Reiji Kawashima =

Japanese voice actor (born 1995)

- 川島 零士
- Born: November 30, 1995 (age 30); Aichi Prefecture, Japan
- Occupation: Voice actor
- Years active: 2017–present
- Agent: Aoni Production
- Notable work: To Your Eternity as Fushi; Mashle as Finn Ames; Mission: Yozakura Family as Taiyo Asano

Reiji Kawashima (川島 零士, Kawashima Reiji; born November 30, 1995) is a Japanese voice actor affiliated with Aoni Production. He is best known for voicing Fushi in To Your Eternity and Patrick / Ricky in Shadows House.

== Biography ==
Reiji Kawashima was born in Aichi Prefecture on November 30, 1995. He cited Final Fantasy X as the reason he decided to become a voice actor. Kawashima starred in his first lead role as Fushi in the anime series To Your Eternity. In 2022, he received the Best New Actor Award at the 16th Seiyu Awards. Kawashima was initially affiliated with the voice acting agency Air Agency, but has since moved to Aoni Production.

In February 2025, Kawashima announced that he had married a non-celebrity woman.

== Filmography ==
=== Television animation ===
2021

- Shadows House as Patrick / Ricky
- To Your Eternity as Fushi

2022

- Shadows House season 2 as Patrick / Ricky
- To Your Eternity season 2 as Fushi
- VazzRock the Animation as Eita Nomura

2023

- Sugar Apple Fairy Tale as Jonas Anders
- Mashle as Finn Ames
- The Great Cleric as Luciel
- Classroom for Heroes as Blade

2024

- Mashle: The Divine Visionary Candidate Exam Arc as Finn Ames
- Cardfight!! Vanguard Divinez as Suo Yobitsugi
- Quality Assurance in Another World as Amano
- Mission: Yozakura Family as Taiyo Asano

2025

- The Gorilla God's Go-To Girl as Isaac Sean
- Necronomico and the Cosmic Horror Show as Eita
- Night of the Living Cat as Arata
- To Your Eternity season 3 as Fushi

2026

- Hana-Kimi as Senri Nakao
- Hell Mode season 2 as Keel
- The Prince of Tennis II: U-17 World Cup Finals Members Decisive Match as Mars de Colón
- The Seven Knights of the Marronnier Kingdom as Hungry
- Magic Repo Man as Lent

2027

- Magical Buffs: The Support Caster Is Stronger Than He Realized! as Wim Strauss
- The Fledgling Demon Lord's Starter Shop as Villager
- Everyone's Darling Has a Secret as Hizashi Hiruno
- Soara and the House of Monsters as Niko

=== Original net animation ===
2017

- Station Memories as Master

=== Video games ===
2019

- Dankira!!! as Sora Asahi (young)
- Skygalleon of the Blue Sky as Eros, Krishna

2020

- Captain Tsubasa: Rise of New Champions as Player character
- Quiz RPG: The World of Mystic Wiz as Koenmaru

2021

- Tarot Boys: 22 Apprentice Fortune Tellers as Heil Lavushka
- Monster Strike as Cony Lu

2022

- Touken Ranbu as Shichiseiken
- Money Parasite: Usotsuki na Onna as Tanaka-san

2025

- Groove Coaster: Future Performers as Kakeru Sendou

2026

- Granblue Fantasy as Meshtioro

=== Multimedia projects ===
2023

- PolaPoriPosuPo as Akari Komakado
