= Jacob Hopkins =

American actor (born 2002)

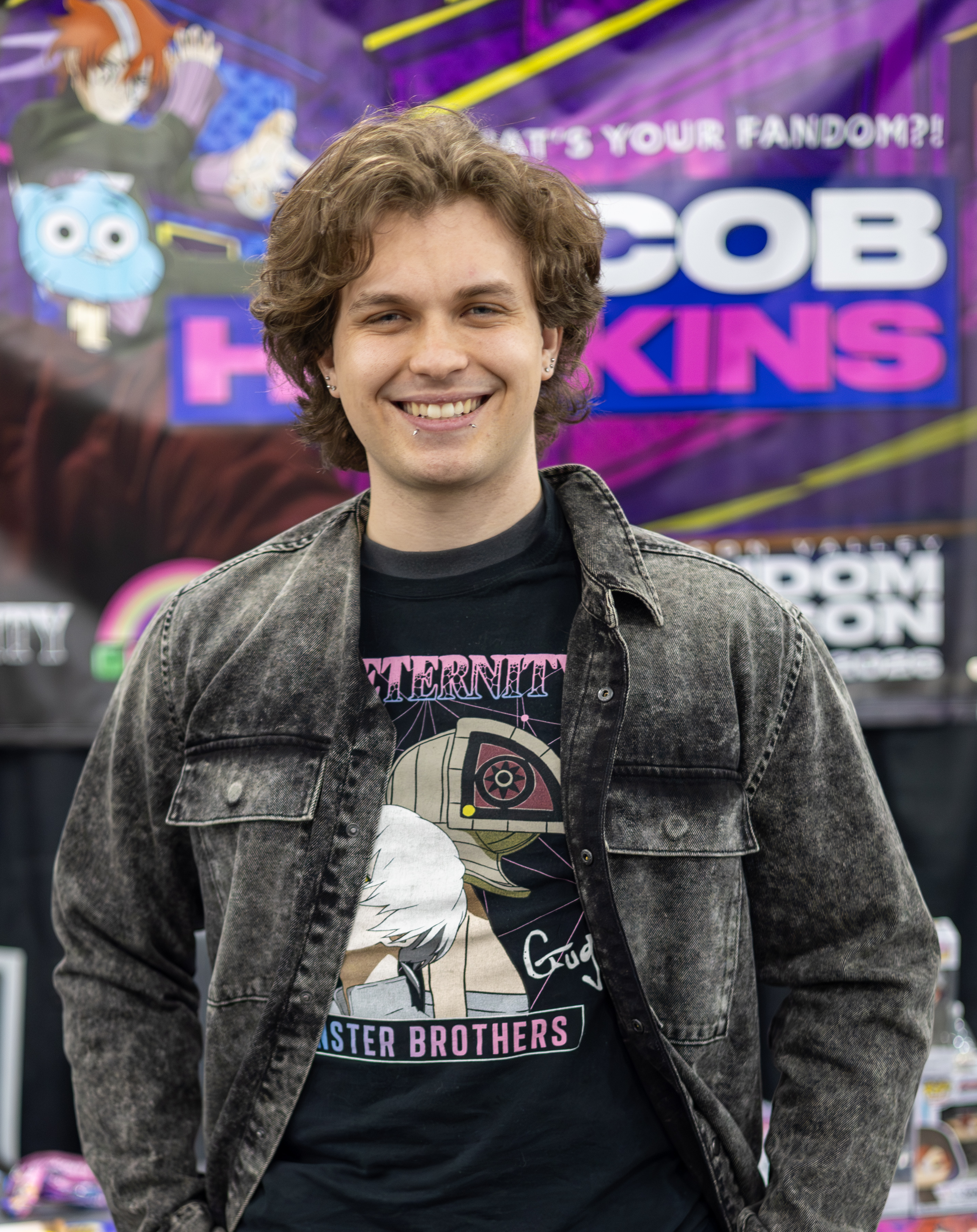
- Hopkins at Fandomcon San Jose in 2026
- Born: Jacob Turner Hopkins; March 4, 2002 (age 24); San Francisco, California, U.S.
- Education: John F. Kennedy High School
- Occupations: Actor; ambassador; advocate
- Years active: 2007–present

Jacob Turner Hopkins (born March 4, 2002) is an American actor. He is best known for voicing Gumball Watterson in The Amazing World of Gumball from 2014 to 2017 and Fushi in To Your Eternity.

== Early life ==
Hopkins was born Jacob Turner Hopkins on March 4, 2002 in San Francisco, California, to actors Gerald and Debra (née Spagnoli) Hopkins. He has an older brother named Gerad (b. 1998) who is a musician, singer, and songwriter. He is of 1/4th Italian ancestry on his mother's side.

== Career ==
Hopkins is known for playing the role of Alexander Drew in True Blood, Chad Kremp in The Goldbergs, and for being the voice of Gumball in The Amazing World of Gumball, after replacing Logan Grove in season 3. During season 5, Hopkins was replaced in the new role of Gumball by Nicolas Cantu, as Hopkins' voice had changed due to puberty. As of 2021, he made his anime debut as Fushi from To Your Eternity, while also voicing Shun Kamiya from Tribe Nine.

As of to date, he currently lends his voice in English dubs for Japanese anime series.

== Personal life ==
Hopkins has been a celebrity ambassador of The Jonathan Foundation, an organization that provides assistance in the special education system in Northridge, California, since 2013.

== Filmography ==
=== Film and Television ===
Year	Title	Role	Notes
2007	The Minis	Brian	
2010	How I Met Your Mother	Billy	Episode: "The Wedding Bride"
2011	Priest	Boy	
2011	Just a Little Heart Attack	Boy	Short film
2011	RCVR	Bobby	6 episodes
2012	Supermoms	Jake	
2012	True Blood	Alexander Drew	3 episodes
2012	Animal Practice	Connor	Episode: "Clean-Smelling Pirate"
2013	Missing at 17	Andrew	Television film
2013	Welcome to Elmore	Gumball Watterson	Voice, promotional video
2013–2020	The Goldbergs	Chad Kremp	Recurring role (seasons 1–3, 6–7); guest (seasons 4–5, 8); 21 episodes
2014	About a Boy	Eddie	Episode: "About a Vasectomy"
2014–2017	The Amazing World of Gumball	Gumball Watterson/Chi Chi	Voice, 92 episodes
2015	The SpongeBob Movie: Sponge Out of Water	Additional Voices	ADR Group; Uncredited
2015	Inside Out	Additional Voices	
2015	Game Shakers	Landru	Episode: "Trip Steals the Jet"
2015	The boy who cried Fish!	Adam	Short film
2016	Agent Gumball	Gumball Watterson	Voice, video game
2016	Middle School: The Worst Years of My Life	Miller	
2016	The Loud House	Andrew	Voice, episode: "Lincoln Loud Girl Guru/Come Sale Away"
2017	The Nerd Posse	Kingston Night	Television film
2018	Planeman	Planeman/Jacob	Voice, short film
2019	We Bare Bears	Boot Crew Drew/Additional Voices	Episode: "Baby Orphan Ninja Bears"
2020–2022	DreamWorks Dragons: Rescue Riders	Axel Finke	Voice
2021	Carolina's Calling	Zack	
2021	Kuroko's Basketball	Additional Voices	Voice, English dub
2021–present	To Your Eternity	Fushi	Voice, English dub
2021	The Vampire Dies in No Time	Homerun Batter	Voice, English dub
2021	Life Lessons with Uramichi Oniisan	Matahiko Nekota	Voice, English dub
2022	Tribe Nine	Shun Kamiya	Voice, English dub
2022	Komi Can't Communicate	Makoto Katai	Voice, English dub
2022–2023	The Prince of Tennis	Shuichiro Oishi	Voice, English dub
2022–2024	Boruto: Naruto Next Generations	Code	Voice, English dub
2023	Legend of Raoh: Chapter of Death in Love	Shiva	Voice, English dub, film
2024	Kenichi: The Mightiest Disciple	Sho Kano	Voice, English dub
2025	Blue Box	Ryosuke Nishida	Voice, English dub
2025	The Summer Hikaru Died	Yuta Maki	Voice, English dub
2026	Kaiju Girl Caramelise	Arata	Voice, English dub

=== Web Series ===
Year	Title	Role	Notes
2026	Brooklyn Broke the Universe †	Ash Brown	Voice, Pilot
