= Fushi (To Your Eternity) =

Fictional character from To Your Eternity

- To Your Eternity character
- Fushi's most common appearance
- First appearance: Chapter 1: "The Final One" (2016)
- Created by: Yoshitoki Ōima
- Voiced by: Reiji Kawashima (Japanese), Jacob Hopkins (English)

In-universe information
- Aliases: Johan; The Orb; Immortal; The White-Haired Immortal

Fushi (Japanese: フシ) is the protagonist of To Your Eternity, a manga series written and illustrated by Yoshitoki Ōima. Initially named "Orb", Fushi is an immortal creature sent by a mysterious entity labeled as "the Beholder" to Earth. He takes multiple forms when first visiting Earth and after befriending a young dying villager, Fushi copies his appearance as a response to his last request of never forgetting him. As the manga progresses, the Orb travels across the planet and is given the name Fushi by a young villager named March while other characters presented in the narrative help him interact with others, forming bonds with the people he meets while becoming more human-like.

Ōima created Fushi as a character who would often connect with readers to struggle with the idea of the importance of surviving and the dilemma of immortality. His immortality traits were created for him to adapt to multiple story arcs where she would be given freedom to create distinctive types of interactions. In the Japanese animated adaptation of the series, Fushi is voiced by Reiji Kawashima. For the English dub, the role was given to Jacob Hopkins.

Critical response to Fushi grew from lukewarm to very positive, praising his characterization from a divinity to a human, as a result of connections forged with the individuals he meets.

== Creation ==
Early sketches of Fushi by Yoshitoki Ōima.

Manga artist Yoshitoki Ōima created Fushi. Fushi was originally going to be female, but a colleague suggested a male protagonist in order to create a different appeal. Ōima wanted to make the protagonist neutral, and said she prefers neutral female characters. Each volume cover represents a character's dream, with the first one which depicting the unnamed youth finding freedom. Volume three depicts Fushi's dream, which is to live happily and peacefully with everyone. According to Oima, Fushi does not want to forget the people he met in journey. She said that she felt some guilt for having characters die. Ōima commented on Fushi's growth over time and that, starting with its early portrayal as an animal. There are approximately 13 characters that are greatly affected by Fushi, per the series' working title of "Ash Swords of 13 People" (『13人の灰剣』), before being changed to "To Your Eternity".

Ōima wanted the reader to find himself, like Fushi, in a situation where he does not know anything. Oima wanted to write Fushi's story ever since she was young and wanted to write the character's grief. It is for this reason that she did not make any character appear apart from the hero. A common theme portrayed in the manga is death and immortality, though the latter is something she does not want to show to the readers based on her own personal view. To reinforce this impression of the unknown, she decided to draw a white universe, which is how she obtained a snowy landscape. The character of March was created to balance Fushi as, thanks to her talkative personality, she makes the narrative more chatty. The ability to take other forms was developed to give the writer the possibility to write new characters who would interact with Fushi easily.

Ōima cited Fushi as her alter-ego due to how she uses him in order to express a message to the readers. Several of Fushi's conflicts are based on the manga author too. As time progresses in the narrative, Fushi was written to become more human in terms of personality and become confused in regards to who are his enemies. This idea is meant to end series' second story arc and start with the third one.

=== Casting ===
Director Masahiko Murata expressed surprise when first reading the manga series, initially believing the young villager would be the lead character rather than Fushi. In casting the actors Reiji Kawashima's voice quality is felt fitting for Fushi from his point of view, which the director agreed with. The first episode only had two voice actors: Kawashima and Kenjiro Tsuda. Tsuda felt that Kawashima was a passionate actor due to how early he appeared in each episode's recording session. Kawashima felt his character to be exhausting to play based on his multiple experiences while Tsuda thought Fushi was too mysterious. For the sixth episode, Kawashima expressed difficulties portraying Fushi's lines due to the fact the character is learning how to speak.

Kawashima said that he was familiar with Ōima before To Your Eternity as he used to read her previous work, A Silent Voice. Upon reading the manga, Kawashima was often moved to tears by both series. Kawashima received instructions from the sound director and also looked at materials about the character in order to understand the role. The actor commented on the scene where Fushi starts eating fruits delivered by March, and chose to eat fruits too in order to make the scene more realistic. Due to Fushi's poor speaking in the early episodes, he executed lines in broken Japanese. The actor often listened to the final product.

In the English dub of the series, Jacob Hopkins voices the character, something he called "A dream come true!" In recording of the first episode, the actor expressed an emotional work not only due to the handling of the unnamed child but also how Fushi ends up becoming him in the ending. Hopkins was curious about the myths that might have inspired Fushi, noting how he starts monotonous but becomes more human with his role in the series. Hopkins recalls being praised by a staff member from Crunchyroll and found the finale emotional due to how Fushi becomes emotional too. Hopkins believes the theme of the series is not about action but about how the main character is gonna deal with living forever and face several hardships.

== Role in To Your Eternity ==
Initially known only as "the Orb", sent to the Earth with no emotions nor identity. The being is able to take on the shape of those around that leave a "strong impression" on him. Starting off as a white orb, he takes the form of a rock, followed by a clump of moss, then a dying wolf. As a wolf, the being meets a boy living alone, who mistakes him for his late pet, Johan. After the boy dies due to a major wound, the wolf takes his form, driven by the youth's last wish to not be forgotten.

The wolf travels south, in accordance to the youth's wishes, until he encounters a young tribal girl named March who names him Fushi. As the girl is about to be sacrificed to a bear, per a religious agreement between her tribe and their neighboring Yanome Kingdom, Fushi and March's friend Parona stop the animal. One of the Yanome soldiers behind the sacrifice, Hayase, takes an interest in Fushi. In the chase, March dies when protecting Parona from an arrow shot, enraging Fushi who kills most of Yanome soldiers as a bear. Shortly after returning to March's village, Parona convinces Fushi to escape from the Yanome soldiers. Fushi then forms of various beings, and acquires new powers, such as the ability to create objects out of nothing. As an elderly woman looks after him, Fushi gradually learns how to act like a human and looks after the idea of becoming independent. Moreover, Fushi continues developing more human emotions across his journey allowing him to meet new people. The Beholder, the person who sent him to Earth, often meets Fushi to test him and explains that their job is overseeing the planet. However, Fushi has no memories of the Beholder, so he ignores him.

Four years later, Fushi meets Hayase again whose obsession with him has developed into dangerous love. Still enraged about March and Parona's deaths, Fushi abandoned her in the ocean. Fushi then continues living in more modern times and is followed by Hayase's female, and one male, descendants/eighteen reincarnations who "succeed her" as leader of the Guardians Corps and are just as obsessed with him as their ancestress was.

The middle-aged Fushi remains on the island for forty years, until Nokkers begin attacking humans off the island. As he prepares to leave, he meets Hisame, the nine-year-old granddaughter of Hayase as well as her first reincarnation. Hisame's left arm contains the Nokker which had attacked and merged with Hayase. The two travel to the site of the Nokker attack, where they meet the grown Tonari and Sander. Hisame tries to kill Tonari, and is wounded herself, but escapes. Tonari dies in front of Fushi, and becomes a spirit. Fushi rescues Hisame and refrains from killing the Nokker in her arm after she agrees to leave him. For the next two centuries, Fushi avoids extensive human contact, and is regularly visited by the obsessed Hayase's seventeen reincarnations and successors; one of which is a male named Kahaku. They establish a religious cult order called the Guardians, worshiping Fushi and opposing the Nokkers per the will of their great-great-great-great-grandmother. After rival religions begin denouncing Fushi, Kahaku removes Fushi from his solitude to further improve his image.

The two are captured by Bon, who had been instructed by the spirit of Tonari to find Fushi. Bon lends his princely approval to Fushi and the Guardians, becoming a target for those opposed to Fushi. Bon witnesses Fushi resurrect a dead princess, but hides the fact from Fushi. Fushi is arrested by another kingdom and forced to demonstrate resurrection but fails. Both Bon and Fushi are imprisoned, with Fushi encased in solid iron. Fushi escapes and rescues Bon, faking his death. The Nokker on Kahaku's arm warns that the Nokkers will attack the large city Renril in one year. Bon and Kahaku gather allies and warn the city, while Fushi further develops his ability to create objects from nothing.

In disguise as an old man, Fushi destroys and recreates buildings in Renril as extensions of his body, and positions bodies he can escape to throughout the city. Hundreds of Nokkers attack the city using new tactics, and during the battle March is accidentally resurrected. Fushi passes out from the strain of defending the city, and three of Bon's allies are killed. When Fushi awakens, Bon tells him they are special and can return to life. Fushi uses them to defend the city, resurrecting them where needed. As the battle continues, Kahaku's Nokker attacks Fushi, returning him to his true form as the Orb. March finds Bon, who kills himself near Fushi, giving him his form. Able to see the spirits of his friends in Bon's form, Fushi remembers them and successfully returns them to life, and the battle is won as Fushi regains strength. Kahaku leaves the city with his Nokker, and later kills himself and his Nokker but not before expressing his strong love for Fushi that he inherited from being the reincarnation of his great-great-great-great-great-grandmother Hayase, vowing to pass on Hayase's bloodline to further generations until the end time.

Fushi tells his friends he will make the world peaceful, and resurrect them after he has done so. He sleeps and spreads his body across the planet, to stop the Nokkers from returning. Fushi's friends live their lives and all die as Fushi sleeps. After 600 years, Fushi's body encompasses the entire planet, now at a modern level of technological advancement. During his sleep, the Nokkers become understandably small, and begin secretly living inside of and controlling human beings. Another reincarnation of Hayase, and Kahaku's Nokker lives in the brain of Mizuha, the eighteenth reincarnation of Hayase, and this Nokker leads the others in preparation for Fushi's return. After awakening, Fushi resurrects the eleven spirits following him, including his closest friends March, Gugu, Tonari and Bon. The Beholder makes to decision to transform himself into a twelve-year-old boy, calling himself Satoru, ultimately abandoning his creation. Fushi meets a boy named Yuki, and Mizuha, who falls in love with him, angering her mother. Mizuha murders her mother, but she returns to life without Fushi's involvement, alerting him to the Nokkers' return. As he learns that the Nokkers are now living peacefully among humanity, Fushi becomes confused about what to do, as he cannot defeat them, worried that he had resurrected his good friends under false promises.

== Reception ==
Critical response to Fushi was initially positive. UK Anime Network praised the story, comparing it with Kino's Journey for the narrative's focus on a growing wanderer. Anime News Network said that while the series starts only with two characters, Fushi and the unnamed villager, Oima managed to create a moving storyline and notices how little by little, Fushi tries to be involved human interaction in later chapters. Another writer from the same site, enjoyed the bond Fushi has with the villager as, thanks to him, he learns several actions, most importantly eating. Otaku USA said that positibily compared Fushi with the cast from Osamu Tezuka's works Dororo and The Three-Eyed One but better executed due to the sensitive portrayals of the themes involving immortality. The bond Fushi forms with the villagers including the nameless one was praised for the idea of despair though another feared Fushi would be involved in too many melodramatic scenarios in future stories as he meets March. Voice actress Rikako Aikawa said that Fushi "received a lot of stimuli throughout his life and hoped that they viewers also do so too while watching the show".

Fushi's character arc was the subject of praise as he was close to acting like a human rather in contrast to his nearly emotionless introduction and felt the tragic tone presented in the story was effective to him, with Fandom Post saying that by the sixth manga volume his constant interactions with the cast produce such reaction in the characters he meets that he "is becoming a living legend, and he may not be able to escape those that would seek to destroy him or those he cares about." Manga News furthermore enjoyed the series' time-skips as Fushi's immortality allows him to blend in with the new more modern scenarios. Fushi's continuous shows of humanity was given praise such as when he becomes enraged when March is killed by a soldier of a villager and kills them in response. Anime News Network further commented that the sixth episode of the anime gave him enough screentime to become the sole main character for the first time and lives up to the series' reputation. In Fushi centered article, Comic Book Resources noted that the series manages to portray Fushi's humanity properly as his inspiration is that of accomplishing the dreams of the people he cared but died across the plot.

There has been commentary on Kawashima's work as Fushi. Rie Hikisaka, who plays the role of March, enjoyed Kawashima's work and his interactions with Pioran among other characters. Anime News Network commented that the actor managed to impress him with how deadpan his lines are. Similarly, Comic Book Resources noted that Fushi became able to have complex emotions in the anime even if the actor's performance makes his line clumsy. His interactions with Gugu were also praised due to how Kawashima expressed different type of emotions while keeping his deadpan tone when he is hurt or he bonds with him.

Jacob Hopkins's work was also the subject of praise with Anime News Network, who hopes that his traits as Fushi are as developed as the unnamed villager.

Fushi has often appeared in charts involving anime characters who became popular in Spring 2021. Fushi's fight with Oniguma was also listed as the seventh best anime fight from 2021 by Crunchyroll.

In the article "Growing Pains: How To Your Eternity Expresses the Experience of Being Human", TWWK from Anime News Network has Fushi's role and growth in the series explored. Fushi is initially seen as a typical alien like the one from E.T. the Extra-Terrestrial (1982) or Starman due to the way he interacts with other characters. As Fushi interacts with humans, he learns both physical and mental pain. By the time Gugu dies in the series, the writer commented that Fushi acts more like a typical preelementary child and be related with the viewer due to how painful is for the audience and the character to meet new characters only to have them die in their journey. The Beholder claims that Fushi needs to continue experiencing pain if he wishes to grow up, which serves as a direct message to both the protagonist and the audience. The writer suggests that both Fushi and the viewer should continue contacting other people as the narrative indicates that there several multi-faceted people who provide multiple types of interactions which makes the journey of a person appealing.
