= The Seven Knights of the Marronnier Kingdom =

Japanese manga series

- First tankōbon volume cover

マロニエ王国の七人の騎士 (Maronie Ōkoku no Shichinin no Kishi)
- Genre: Historical fantasy
- Manga
- Written by: Nao Iwamoto
- Published by: Shogakukan
- English publisher: NA: Viz Media
- Imprint: Flower Comics α
- Magazine: Flowers
- Original run: September 28, 2016 – present
- Volumes: 11
- Anime television series
- Directed by: Kiyoko Sayama
- Written by: Shinzō Fujita
- Music by: Yoshiaki Fujisawa
- Studio: J.C.Staff
- Licensed by: Amazon Prime Video
- Original network: NHK Educational TV
- Original run: October 3, 2026 – present
- Episodes: 8
- icon

The Seven Knights of the Marronnier Kingdom (Japanese: マロニエ王国の七人の騎士, Hepburn: Maronie Ōkoku no Shichinin no Kishi) is a Japanese manga series written and illustrated by Nao Iwamoto. It began serialization Shogakukan's josei manga magazine Flowers in September 2016. An anime television series adaptation produced by J.C.Staff premiered in October 2026.

== Plot ==
The story is set in the Kingdom of Marronnier, a nation surrounded by seven neighboring countries whose relations have remained strained for decades. Seeking to strengthen ties and preserve peace, the kingdom's famed female general, Baribara, dispatches her seven sons on diplomatic missions to the surrounding nations. Her sons are each a knight commander with a distinctive personality and talent. The brothers set out to represent Marronnier and foster cooperation among the continent's eight kingdoms.

As the brothers travel to distant lands, each encounters unique cultures, challenges, and political intrigues. Their journeys gradually reveal deeper tensions between the nations, as well as lingering questions surrounding Baribara's origins and the special qualities possessed by her sons. Meanwhile, the princess of Marronnier secretly leaves the palace in disguise under the name Bruno and accompanies one of the brothers on his journey.

== Characters ==
Insomniac (眠くない, Nemukunai)
Voiced by: Kengo Takanashi, Natsu Yorita^{Ep. 2 credits} (young) (Japanese); Kevin Andrew Rivera (English)
Fraternity (博愛, Hakuai)
Voiced by: Makoto Tanikawa (Japanese); Paul Castro Jr. (English)
Feverish (暑がりや, Atsugariya)
Voiced by: Haruki Ishiya (Japanese); Skyler Brigmann (English)
Chilly (寒がりや, Samugariya)
Voiced by: Satoshi Inomata (Japanese); Daniel Sean Smith (English)
Beast-Tamer (獣使い, Kedamonotsukai)
Voiced by: Kiyoto Mizuno (Japanese); Corey Holland (English)
Swordsman (剣自慢, Ken Jiman)
Voiced by: Taishi Murata (Japanese); John Patneaude (English)
Hungry (ハラペコ, Harapeko)
Voiced by: Reiji Kawashima (Japanese); Ryan Bartley (English)
Baribara (バリバラ)
Voiced by: Akeno Watanabe (Japanese); Chelsea Krause (English)
The mother of Insomniac, Fraternity, Feverish, Chilly, Beast-Tamer, Swordsman, and Hungry. She is a strict, no-nonsense general who helps Eleonora train.
Princess Brunhild (ブリュンヒルデ姫, Buryunhirude Hime)
Voiced by: Natsumi Fujiwara (Japanese); Mariah Tzoumbas (English)
Eleonora (エレオノーラ, Ereonōra)
Voiced by: Miyuki Sakurai (Japanese); Kennedy Hibbert (English)
King Lionel (ライオネル, Raioneru)
Voiced by: Hiroshi Tsuchida (Japanese); Aeric Azana (English)
Elliot (エリオット, Eriotto)
Voiced by: Takehito Koyasu (Japanese); Keith Silverstein^{Ep. 3 credits} (English)
Kastehelmi (カステヘルミ, Kasuteherumi)
Voiced by: Yurie Funato (Japanese); Abby Espiritu^{Ep. 5 credits} (English)
Rollo (ロロ, Roro)
Voiced by: Atsushi Ono (Japanese); Todd Haberkorn^{Ep. 7 credits} (English)
Mysterious Boy (謎の少年, Nazo no Shōnen)
Voiced by: Yūsuke Kobayashi (Japanese); Paul Castro Jr. (English)
Birgitta (ビルギッタ, Birugitta)
Voiced by: Ai Kayano (Japanese); Yolis Arroyo (English)
Hugo (ヒューゴ, Hyūgo)
Voiced by: Kazuyuki Okitsu
Peregrinus (ペレグリナス, Peregurinasu)
Voiced by: Daisuke Namikawa
Anna-Marie (アナマリー, Anamarī)
Voiced by: Maki Kawase
Lavinia (ラヴィニア, Ravuinia)
Voiced by: Kyō Yaoya
Justice (ジャスティス, Jasutisu)
Voiced by: Natsuki Hanae
Zoe (ゾーイ, Zōi)
Voiced by: Mitsuki Saiga
Colette (コレット, Koretto)
Voiced by: Miyuri Shimabukuro
Hyrokkin (ヒュロッキン, Hyruokkin)
Voiced by: Naomi Shindō
Saturno (土星, Dosei)
Voiced by: Ryōta Takeuchi

== Media ==
=== Manga ===
Written and illustrated by Nao Iwamoto, The Seven Knights of the Marronnier Kingdom began serialization in Shogakukan's josei manga magazine Flowers on September 28, 2016, with its chapters compiled into eleven tankōbon volumes as of June 2026.

In October 2026, Viz Media announced that it had licensed the series for English publication.

| No. | Release date | ISBN |
|---|---|---|
| 1 | August 10, 2017 | 978-4-09-139427-9 |
| 2 | June 8, 2018 | 978-4-09-870122-3 |
| 3 | April 10, 2019 | 978-4-09-870450-7 |
| 4 | February 10, 2020 | 978-4-09-870859-8 |
| 5 | February 10, 2021 | 978-4-09-871276-2 |
| 6 | December 10, 2021 | 978-4-09-871495-7 |
| 7 | December 9, 2022 | 978-4-09-871766-8 |
| 8 | August 10, 2023 | 978-4-09-872211-2 |
| 9 | June 10, 2024 | 978-4-09-872565-6 |
| 10 | June 10, 2025 | 978-4-09-873069-8 |
| 11 | June 10, 2026 | 978-4-09-873418-4 |

=== Anime ===
An anime television series adaptation was announced on June 1, 2026. It is produced by J.C.Staff and directed by Kiyoko Sayama, with Shinzō Fujita writing scripts and handling series composition, Yuriko Maeda designing the characters, Yoshiaki Fujisawa composing the music, and Show Hayami narrating the series. The series premiered on October 3, 2026, on NHK Educational TV. The opening theme song is "Sayonara wa Iwanai" (さよならは言わない; 'I Will Not Say Goodbye'), performed by Yama, while the ending theme song is "Marronnier no Hana ga Saku Koro ni" (マロニエの花が咲く頃に), composed by Yoshiaki Fujisawa. Amazon Prime Video is exclusively streaming the series worldwide.

==== Episodes ====
| No. | Title | Directed by (Note: Production staff information is taken from the ending credits of each episode.) (Note: All the prologues are storyboarded and directed by Yoshinobu Yamakawa.) | Storyboarded by | Original release date |
|---|---|---|---|---|
| 1 | "The Seven Knights"; Transliteration: "Nana-ri no Kishi" (Japanese: 七人の騎士) | Yasuo Iwamoto | Kiyoko Sayama | October 3, 2026 |
| 2 | "Spring by the Lake"; Transliteration: "Kojō no Haru" (Japanese: 湖上の春) | Aya Kawamura | Kiyoko Sayama | October 10, 2026 |
| 3 | "Recklessness"; Transliteration: "Kowai Mono Shirazu" (Japanese: 怖いもの知らず) | Zhe Liu | Kiyoko Sayama | October 17, 2026 |
| 4 | "Eleonora"; Transliteration: "Ereonōra" (Japanese: エレオノーラ) | Yūsuke Onoda | Kiyoko Sayama | October 24, 2026 |
| 5 | "When We Go Home"; Transliteration: "Kaettara" (Japanese: 帰ったら) | Takuma Miura | Kiyoko Sayama | October 31, 2026 |
| 6 | "Red and Blue, Nights and Stars"; Transliteration: "Aka to Ao to Yoru to Hoshi to" (Japanese: 赤と青と夜と星と) | 太郎〇三 | Kiyoko Sayama | November 7, 2026 |
| 7 | "The Message"; Transliteration: "Dengon" (Japanese: 伝言) | Miyuki Ishida | Yoshinobu Yamakawa | November 14, 2026 |
| 8 | "My Name's Not Insomniac for Nothing"; Transliteration: "Dakara Boku wa Nemuraserarenai" (Japanese: だから僕は眠らせられない) | Sayaka Morikawa | Yoshinobu Yamakawa | November 21, 2026 |
| 9 | "When Night Ends"; Transliteration: "Yoru no Owari ni" (Japanese: 夜の終わりに) | TBA | TBA | November 28, 2026 |

== Reception ==
The series topped the 2018 edition of Takarajimasha's Kono Manga ga Sugoi! guidebook list of the best manga for female readers.

== See also ==
- Gold Kingdom and Water Kingdom, another manga series by the same author
