= Kiyoko Sayama =

Japanese animator and director

Kiyoko Sayama (佐山 聖子, Sayama Kiyoko; born August 3) is a Japanese animator and director. She was born in Saitama Prefecture. Her name is sometimes misromanized as Seiko Sayama.

== Works ==
=== TV Anime ===
- Nintama Rantarou (1993–1994) - Storyboard, Episode Director
- Tama & Friends (1994) - Storyboard, Episode Director
- Soar High! Isami (1994–1996) - Storyboard, Episode Director
- Harimogu Harley (1996) - Director
- Saber Marionette J to X (1998) - Chief Director, Storyboard (eps 1, 3, 6, 8–9, 11-25 odd), Episode Director (eps 1, 6, 9, 13, 17, 19, 21, 25), Background Art (ep 12), Illustration (ep 26), Key Animation (eps 9, 25), Photography Assistant (ED for ep. 25)
- Magic User's Club (1999) - Storyboard, Episode Director
- Now and Then, Here and There (1999–2000) - Storyboard
- Hunter × Hunter (1999–2001) - Storyboard
- Tsukikage Ran (2000) - Storyboard
- Boys Be... (2000) - Special Thanks
- Gravitation (2000–2001) - Storyboard, Episode Director
- Prétear (2001) - Director
- Shiawase Sou no Okojo-san (2001–2002) - Storyboard, Episode Director
- Seven of Seven (2002) - Storyboard
- Ai Yori Aoshi (2002) - Storyboard
- Chobits (2002) - Storyboard
- King of Bandit Jing (2002) - Episode Director
- Princess Tutu (2002–2003) - Storyboard, Episode Director
- Galaxy Angel A (2002–2003) - Storyboard
- Last Exile (2003) - Storyboard
- Kaleido Star (2003) - Storyboard, Episode Director
- Jubei-chan 2 (2004) - Storyboard
- Uta Kata (2004) - Storyboard
- Sgt. Frog (2004–2011) - Storyboard
- Fushigiboshi no Futagohime (2005–2006) - Storyboard
- Blood+ (2005–2006) - Storyboard, Episode Director
- ARIA The NATURAL (2006) - Storyboard, Episode Director
- Ōban Star-Racers (2006) - Storyboard, Episode Director
- Nana (2006) - Storyboard
- Bokura ga Ita (2006) - Storyboard
- Skip Beat! (2008) - Director
- Vampire Knight (2008) - Director, Storyboard (OP1, ED1; eps 1, 3, 7, 13), Episode Director (OP1, ED1; ep 1)
- Vampire Knight Guilty (2008) - Director, Storyboard (OP, ED; eps 3, 6, 10, 13), Episode Director (OP, ED)
- Brave 10 (2012) - Director
- No Game No Life (2014) - Storyboard (eps. 5, 10)
- Flying Witch (2016) - Storyboard (eps. 5, 10), Episode Director (eps. 5, 10)
- A Place Further than the Universe (2018) - Storyboard (ep. 11)
- Amanchu! Advance (2018) - Director
- To Your Eternity 2nd Season (2022–2023) - Director
- To Your Eternity 3rd Season (2025) - Chief Director
- The Seven Knights of the Marronnier Kingdom (2026) - Director

=== OVA ===
- Miyuki-chan in Wonderland (1995) - Director (episode 1)
- Angel Sanctuary (2000) - Director
