= Ishida Station =

Ishida Station may refer to:

- Ishida Station (Kyoto), a subway station on the Tōzai Line in Kyoto, Japan
- Ishida Station (Fukuoka), a railway station on the Hitahikosan Line in Kitakyūshū, Japan

== See also ==
- Aikō-Ishida Station, a railway station in Kanagawa, on the Odakyū Odawara Line
- Dentetsu-Ishida Station, a railway station in Toyama, on the Toyama Chihō Railway Main Line
