= Mardock Scramble =

Japanese novel series

- Region 1 DVD cover of the first film released by Sentai Filmworks

マルドゥック・スクランブル (Marudoukku sukuranburu)
- Genre: Cyberpunk; Neo-noir; Philosophical
- Serial novel
- Written by: Tow Ubukata
- Illustrated by: Katsuya Terada
- Published by: Hayakawa
- English publisher: NA: Viz Media
- Imprint: Hayakawa Bunko JA
- Magazine: Hayakawa's SF Magazine
- Original run: May 2003 – July 2003
- Volumes: 3
- Serial novel

Mardock Velocity
- Written by: Tow Ubukata
- Illustrated by: Katsuya Terada
- Published by: Hayakawa
- Imprint: Hayakawa Bunko JA
- Magazine: Hayakawa's SF Magazine
- Original run: November 8, 2006 – November 25, 2006
- Volumes: 3
- Manga
- Written by: Yoshitoki Ōima
- Published by: Kodansha
- English publisher: NA: Kodansha USA
- Magazine: Bessatsu Shōnen Magazine
- Original run: October 9, 2009 – May 9, 2012
- Volumes: 7
- Anime film series
- Directed by: Susumu Kudō
- Produced by: Haruka Soya; Gō Nakanishi; Tomoyuki Katō
- Written by: Tow Ubukata
- Music by: Conisch
- Studio: GoHands
- Licensed by: AUS: Madman Entertainment; NA: Sentai Filmworks (expired); UK: Kazé UK/Manga Entertainment
- Released: November 6, 2010 – September 29, 2012
- Runtime: 70 minutes (each)
- Films: 3
- Novel

Mardock Fragments
- Written by: Tow Ubukata
- Illustrated by: Katsuya Terada
- Published by: Hayakawa
- Published: May 10, 2011
- Novel

Mardock Anonymous
- Written by: Tow Ubukata
- Illustrated by: Katsuya Terada
- Published by: Hayakawa
- Published: March 24, 2016
- Manga

Mardock Demons
- Written by: Minamoto Katasuke
- Published by: Kodansha
- Magazine: Nemesis
- Original run: December 2016 – June 2018
- Volumes: 2

Mardock Scramble (マルドゥック・スクランブル, Marudukku Sukuranburu) is a Japanese novel series written by Tow Ubukata. The first novel was published in Japan in May 2003, with the final novel published in July 2003. They were later adapted into a manga series and an anime film trilogy. In North America, Viz Media licensed the novels and published all three in one volume. Kodansha USA published the manga series in English, and Sentai Filmworks released anime films on DVD and Blu-ray Disc.

The story is about a girl named Rune Balot who was taken in by a man named Shell who later tried to kill her and left her for dead. She is saved and turned into a cyborg. It is up to her to stop Shell and his evil gang.

In 2003, Mardock Scramble won the Grand Prize of the 24th Nihon SF Taisho Award.

== Plot ==
Taking place in a futuristic city called Mardock City, Rune Balot is a former prostitute turned vigilante who was taken in by the notorious gambler Shell Septinos. One night, Shell abandons Rune and attempts to murder her in an explosion. However, she is rescued and transformed into a cyborg by Dr. Easter under regulation Mardock Scramble 09, an emergency ordinance where experimental technologies can be used to preserve life. An Artificial intelligence who takes the form of a mouse accompanies her to adapt to her new life. Rune is trained to use the advanced technology fitted on her to defend herself against Shell's attempts to have her killed to stop her from testifying against him.

== Characters ==
Rune Balot (ルーン=バロット, Rūn Barotto)
Voiced by: Megumi Hayashibara (Japanese); Hilary Haag (English)
A prostitute who becomes a pawn to the notorious gambler Shell Septinos who then tries to kill her. She is retrieved and changed into a cyborg by Dr. Easter under regulation Mardock Scramble 09. Rune is trained to use the advanced technology embedded within her and the AI construct Œufcoque to assist in Dr. Easter's murder investigation into Shell. She uses these technologies to defend herself against the assassination attempts by the Bandersnatch group and Boiled, and take her revenge against the man who tried to terminate her.
Œufcoque Penteano (ウフコック=ペンティーノ, Ufukokku Pentīno)
Voiced by: Norito Yashima (Japanese); Andy McAvin (English)
An artificial Intelligence multidimensional construct that can transform into any object or weapon, but mostly appears as a small male mouse. He was created to assist Mardock Scramble 09 case officers and is allowed to live as long as he maintains his usefulness.
Dr. Easter (ドクター・イースター, Dokutā Īsutā)
Voiced by: Hiroki Tōchi (Japanese); David Matranga (English)
A Freelance 09 Case Officer who saves Rune Balot and turns her into a cyborg. He gives her Œufcoque to pursue his court case against Shell Septinos.
Shell Septinos (シェル=セプティノス, Sheru Seputinosu)
Voiced by: Kazuya Nakai (Japanese); Kalob Martinez (Movies 1-2), Leraldo Anzaldua (Movie 3) (English)
The manager of the Eggnog Blue casino and funded by the October Corporation. He murders women whose bodies he then has transformed into blue diamonds which he wears as rings. The first woman he killed was his mother who sexually molested him as a child. To avoid dealing with his guilt, he has his memories removed and stored as digital data. He is on trial for these murders and hires the Bandersnatch group and then Boiled to kill Balot and stop her from testifying against him in court. Shell is also engaged to Octavia October, Cleanwill's beautiful but idiotic daughter.
Dimsdale Boiled (ディムズデイル=ボイルド, Dimuzudeiru Boirudo)
Voiced by: Tsutomu Isobe (Japanese); David Wald (English)
A Freelance 09 Case Officer who used to be Œufcoque's partner and wants to retrieve the construct from Dr. Easter and Balot. He is also hired by Shell to kill Balot.
Welldone the Pussyhand (ウェルダン・ザ・プッシーハンド, Uerudan za Pusshīhando)
Voiced by: Masahiko Tanaka (Japanese); Christopher Ayres (English)
The Leader of the Bandersnatch group of assassins and has a vagina grafted onto his hand. The group deals in human body parts and use the discarded parts themselves, or eat them if otherwise unneeded.
Medium the Fingernail (ミディアム・ザ・フィンガーネイル, Midiamu za Fingāneiru)
Voiced by: Norio Wakamoto (Japanese); Justin Doran (English)
A member of the Bandersnatch group who collects fingers and wears them as a necklace around his neck.
Rare the Hair (レア・ザ・ヘア, Rea za Hea)
Voiced by: Mika Kanai (Japanese); Luci Christian (English)
A member of the Bandersnatch group who collects hair and skin.
Mincemeat the Wink (ミンチ・ザ・ウィンク, Minchi za Uinku)
Voiced by: Kenta Miyake (Japanese); Andrew Love (English)
A strongman in the Bandersnatch group who collects eyes and has them transplanted into his body.
Flesh the Pike (フレッシュ・ザ・パイク, Furesshu za Paiku)
Voiced by: Tomohiro Waki
A hacker in the Bandersnatch group who has breasts transplanted onto his body.
Tweedledee (トゥイードルディ, Tuīdorudi)
Voiced by: Yumiko Kobayashi (Japanese); Corey Hartzog (English)
A human cyborg created and living within the Paradise created by three scientists but it is now taken over by the government.
Tweedledim (トゥイードルディム, Tuīdorudimu)
Voiced by: Daisuke Namikawa (Japanese); Mark X. Laskowski (English)
A dolphin and Tweedledee's lover in Paradise.
Professor Faceman (プロフェッサー・フェイスマン, Purofessā Feisuman)
Voiced by: Kinryū Arimoto (Japanese); Carl Masterson (English)
A Disembodied Head Administrator at the Paradise facility who lost the rest of his body to cancer.
Cleanwill John October (クリーンウィル・ジョン・オクトーバー, Kurīn'uiru Jon Okutōbā)
Voiced by: Masayuki Komuro (Japanese); John Swasey (English)
The owner and company director of the Eggnog Blue casino, Shell Septinos's business partner and father of Octavia October. It is also revealed that John is a paedophile (an adult who has sexual feelings for children). He makes his first appearance in Mardock Scramble: The Second Combustion.
Octavia (オクタヴィア, Okutavia)
Voiced by: Akiko Katsuta (Japanese); Luci Christian (English)
The beautiful but idiotic daughter of Cleanwill John October and the fiancée of Shell Septinos. She makes her first appearance in Mardock Scramble: The Second Combustion.
Bell Wing (ベル・ウィング, Beru Uingu)
Voiced by: Toshiko Fujita (Japanese); Susan Koozin (English)
A spinner at the roulette table in the Eggnog Blue casino. She is fired for losing to Rune Balot.
Ashley Harvest (アシュレイ・ハーヴェスト, Ashurei Hāvesuto)
Voiced by: Takaya Hashi (Japanese); Brett Weaver (Movie 2), Andrew Love (Movie 3) (English)
The manager of the Eggnog Blue casino who takes over from Marlowe John Fever after firing him for losing to Rune Balot.
Marlowe John Fever (マーロウ・ジョン・フィーバー, Mārō Jon Fībā)
Voiced by: Daisuke Ono (Japanese); Adam Gibbs (English)
A Blackjack dealer at the Eggnog Blue casino. He is fired for losing to Rune Balot.

== Media ==
=== Novel ===
The story was written by Tow Ubukata, and illustrated by Katsuya Terada was serialized in Hayakawa's SF Magazine. The first novel was published in May 2003, and the final novel was published in July 2003. A prequel, Mardock Velocity, was released in three volumes in November 2006. Another volume titled Mardock Fragments was released on May 10, 2011. A sequel titled Mardock Anonymous was released on March 24, 2016. Viz Media licensed the original novels in English and published all three in one volume on January 18, 2011.

=== Manga ===
A manga adaptation illustrated by Yoshitoki Ōima was published in Kodansha's Bessatsu Shōnen Magazine between October 9, 2009, and May 9, 2012, compiled in seven volumes. The first volume was released in Japan on March 17, 2010, and the last on June 9, 2012. Kodansha USA published the manga in English, the first volume was released on August 23, 2011, while the last one was released on May 21, 2013. A two-volume spinoff titled Mardock Demons and illustrated by Minamoto Katasuke was published in the Nemesis magazine from 2016 to 2018.

No.	Original release date	Original ISBN	English release date	English ISBN
1	March 17, 2010	978-4-06-384278-4	August 23, 2011	978-1935429531
2	August 17, 2010	978-4-06-384353-8	October 18, 2011	978-1935429548
3	October 15, 2010	978-4-06-384389-7	December 6, 2011	978-1935429555
4	January 7, 2011	978-4-06-384408-5	February 21, 2012	978-1612620664
5	June 9, 2011	978-4-06-384499-3	June 19, 2012	978-1612621197
6	December 9, 2011	978-4-06-384574-7	October 30, 2012	978-1612622385
7	June 9, 2012	978-4-06-384698-0	May 21, 2013	978-1612622989

=== Cancelled anime OVAs ===
An OVA anime series was announced by Gonzo in 2005 which would have been directed by Yasufumi Soejima and produced by Geneon, screenplay written by Ubukata himself and character designs by Range Murata (Blue Submarine No. 6, Last Exile). However, the project was cancelled in 2006.

=== Anime films ===
On January 18, 2010, a website opened up that announced that an anime adaptation would take place. Later, it was confirmed that the Mardock Scramble anime would be turned into a film trilogy. The film trilogy was animated at GoHands studio and produced by Aniplex, directed by Susumu Kudō and the screenplay was written by Ubukata himself. The soundtrack was composed by Conisch.

1. The first film, The First Compression, was released in Japanese theaters on November 6, 2010. It was also aired on Anime Festival Asia 2010.
2. The second film, The Second Combustion, was released in to Japanese theaters on September 3, 2011.
3. The third film, The Third Exhaust, was released in Japanese theaters on September 29, 2012.

Sentai Filmworks has licensed the three films and released The First Compression on DVD on September 27, 2011, followed by a Blu-ray Disc release on March 13, 2012. On the DVD the nudity from the theatrical release has been censored out, the Blu-ray contains both editions of the movie. DVDs of the last two films, The Second Combustion and The Third Exhaust, were released on January 1, 2012, and March 25, 2014, respectively.

No.	Title	Original release date
1	"The First Compression"	November 6, 2010
In futuristic Kamina City, the prostitute Rune Balot has become a slave to the notorious gambler Shell Septinous. One night, he locks her in his limousine and blows up the vehicle. After the explosion her severely damaged body is taken and transformed into a cyborg by Dr. Easter under regulation Mardock Scramble 09. Easter assigns to her an Artificial intelligence construct called Oeufcoque which can transform into any object, but mostly appears in the form of a mouse. Oeufcoque's former owner, Dimsdale Boiled wants the AI unit back. Three days later, she is cross-examined at the court case into Shell's actions, but is intensively questioned about the past life and sexually abusive father in an attempt to discredit her. Boiled exchanges human body parts with the Bandersnatch Company for data he then destroys. To have Balot eliminated he offers her to them as an excellent source of body parts. Meanwhile Dr. Easter upgrades Balot's Snark abilities. The Bandersnatch Company attack Balot but she easily defeats them with Oeufcoque's assistance. The powerful cyborg Boiled goes after Balot himself to retrieve Oeufcoque. During the battle, Oeufcoque rejects her as part of its self-defense mechanism and she is left defenseless. Boiled prepares to kill her while Oeufcoque lies dying and unable to help.
2	"The Second Combustion"	September 3, 2011
Just as Balot is about to be killed by Boiled, Dr. Easter arrives in the Flying House Humpty, an egg-shaped airborne vehicle, and rescues her with Oeufcoque. Balot awakes in a lab with Tweedledee who calls it Paradise. She meets Professor Faceman who tells her about the work carried out there. Boiled meets with Shell and they discuss their situation and the nature of his business. He wants Balot killed. Boiled goes to the Paradise facility with his psychopathic assistant who is attacked and destroyed by the shark-like security guards, but Dr. Easter escapes with Balot in Flying House Humpty. Using her technology, Balot finds that the incriminating memories of the women Shell has killed are stored on four 1 million dollar casino chips. Dr. Easter then starts teaching Balot gambling techniques to beat the casino and win the chips. Balot has a tearful reunion with the repaired Oeufcoque. They all go to the casino and, using Dr. Easter's strategy, win at cards and then at the roulette table run by Bell Wing. Lastly they enter the high-roller blackjack room for higher stakes.
3	"The Third Exhaust"	September 29, 2012
Dr. Easter and Balot play blackjack at the table of dealer Marlowe John Fever. They start to win with Oeufcoque's help, but draw the attention of the casino manager Ashley Harvest who tells Shell. Balot wins enough for one 1 million dollar chip and Oeufcoque downloads its data. Ashley Harvest takes over the dealing, but Easter suspects that the cards are stacked and withdraws from the game. Balot plays on, believing that she has worked out his system. After winning a couple of hands, she bets the million dollar chip and wins three more. Rather than cash them in she asks to see the owner Cleanwill John October. As he arrives, and after Oeufcoque has scanned the chips, she loses them on the next hand. Boiled follows them in his car and they have a shoot-out in which Balot is shot. After she recovers they analyse Shell's memories to establish the process that led to his crimes. Boiled proposes a deal, but when they arrive at Shell's apartment, they find his fiancée dead and are ambushed. She kills the gunmen and finds Cleanwill John October surrounded by young children and wants to kill him, but Easter talks her out of it. She goes after Shell, and after disabling him, inserts the memories of the murders he committed that he wanted to forget. Boiled arrives and in the ensuing shoot-out, and with the assistance of Oeufcoque, she manages to kill him.

=== Proposed live-action film ===
On May 30, 2012, it was reported that Dentsu and Hayakawa Publishing licensed the rights to produce a live-action film adaptation of Mardock Scramble and Michael Davis is scheduled to produce and direct the film. However, on May 31, Hayakawa editor Yoshihiro Shiozawa confirmed that the rights of the film are not sold yet and have been in negotiations.

== Reception ==
Mardock Scramble won the Grand Prize of the 24th Nihon SF Taisho Award by the Science Fiction and Fantasy Writers of Japan (SFWJ) in 2003. The novel was nominated for the Grand Prize of the 3rd Sense of Gender Awards in 2004. It was nominated for the Best Japanese Long Work category at the 35th Seiun Awards in 2004.
