= Masatoshi Ishida =

Masatoshi Ishida may refer to:

- Masatoshi Ishida (footballer), Japanese footballer
- Masatoshi Ishida (politician), Japanese politician
