= Tsunenobu Ishida =

Japanese swimmer

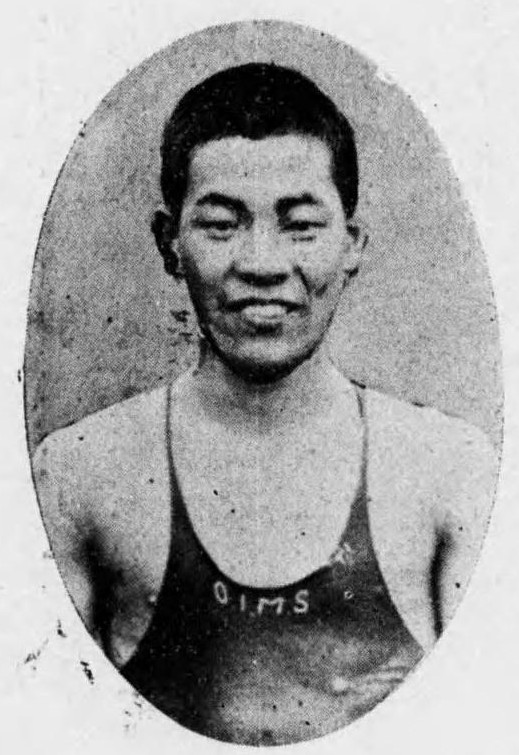

Personal information
- Born: 8 June 1905

Sport
- Sport: Swimming

Tsunenobu Ishida (石田 恒信, Ishida Tsunenobu; born 8 June 1905, date of death unknown) was a Japanese swimmer. He competed in two events at the 1924 Summer Olympics.
