= Yoshitoki Ōima =

Japanese manga artist (b. 1989)

- 大今 良時
- Born: March 15, 1989 (age 37); Ōgaki, Gifu, Japan
- Occupation: Manga artist
- Known for: A Silent Voice; To Your Eternity

Yoshitoki Ōima (大今 良時, Ōima Yoshitoki; born March 15, 1989) is a Japanese manga artist and writer, best known for her manga series A Silent Voice and To Your Eternity.

== Life ==
Ōima was born on March 15, 1989, in Ōgaki, Japan, as the third daughter of a sign language interpreter mother and has an older sister and an older brother. Due to her mother's work as a sign language interpreter, Ōima was inspired to write the A Silent Voice manga series where she got help by her mother and her sister working on the series.

Her first manga was Mardock Scramble — an adaptation of the novel of the same name written by Tow Ubukata — and was released in 2009. She was also responsible for an illustration of the ending sequence of the ninth episode of Attack on Titan. After her success with A Silent Voice Yoshitoki Ōima worked alongside other manga artists on a collaboration manga called Ore no 100-wame!!. In 2016 Yoshitoki Ōima released her third full manga series under the moniker To Your Eternity.

In 2015, Yoshitoki Ōima won the New Creator Prize for A Silent Voice at the Tezuka Osamu Cultural Prize. A Silent Voice was nominated for an Eisner Award a year later, the Rudolf-Dirks-Award and the Max & Moritz Prize in 2017 and 2018. In 2018 she won at French Japan Expo the Daruma d′Or Manga for A Silent Voice and the Daruma de la Meilleure Nouvelle Série for To Your Eternity.

== Works ==
- Mardock Scramble (2009–2012; serialized in Bessatsu Shōnen Magazine)
- A Silent Voice (2013–2014; serialized in Weekly Shōnen Magazine)
- Ore no 100-wame!! (2015; alongside other manga artists)
- To Your Eternity (2016–2025; serialized in Weekly Shōnen Magazine)

== Accolades ==
- Tezuka Osamu Cultural Prize
  - 2015: New Creator Prize for A Silent Voice (won)
- Manga Taishō
  - 2015: Manga for A Silent Voice (nominated)
  - 2018: Manga for To Your Eternity (nominated)
- Eisner Awards
  - 2016: Best U.S. Edition of International Material—Asia for A Silent Voice (nominated)
- Rudolf-Dirks-Awards
  - 2017: Best Scenario (Asia) for A Silent Voice (won)
- Max & Moritz Prize
  - 2018: for A Silent Voice (nominated)
- Japan Expo
  - 2018: Daruma d′Or Manga for A Silent Voice (won)
  - 2018: Daruma de la Meilleure Nouvelle Série for To Your Eternity (won)
