= A Silent Voice (manga) =

Japanese manga series

- First tankōbon volume cover, featuring Shoya Ishida (left) and Shouko Nishimiya (right)

聲の形 (Koe no Katachi)
- Genre: Psychological drama
- Manga
- Written by: Yoshitoki Ōima
- Published by: Kodansha
- English publisher: NA: Kodansha USA
- Magazine: Weekly Shōnen Magazine
- Original run: August 7, 2013 – November 19, 2014
- Volumes: 7
- Anime film
- A Silent Voice (2016)
- icon

A Silent Voice (Japanese: 聲の形, Hepburn: Koe no Katachi; lit. 'The Shape of Voice') is a Japanese manga series written and illustrated by Yoshitoki Ōima. The series was originally published as a one-shot in Kodansha's Bessatsu Shōnen Magazine and was later serialized in Weekly Shōnen Magazine from August 2013 to November 2014. Its chapters were collected in seven tankōbon volumes. The manga was digitally released in English by Crunchyroll Manga and was licensed by Kodansha USA in North America. An anime theatrical film adaptation produced by Kyoto Animation was released in September 2016.

== Plot ==
In sixth grade, Shoya Ishida leads the class in bullying Shouko Nishimiya, a prelingually deaf classmate who is new to the school. When Shoya's actions are finally condemned by the principal, all of his friends and teachers turn against him, socially isolating him well into high school to the point that he eventually considers suicide, which he believes would absolve him of his bad deeds. He was going to kill himself on April 15 but stopped since he swore not to. Shoya tried to end it all to make himself feel better thinking it wouldn't affect the people around him. To make amends, he reunites with Shouko, who is still lonely due to her shyness. Realizing that both are suffering due to his past sins, Shoya sets out on a path of redemption by trying to reconnect Shouko with their old classmates that Shouko never had the chance to befriend back then, including Shoya's former comrade, Naoka Ueno, who holds a grudge against Shouko for "causing" Shoya's isolation; Miki Kawai, their narcissistic former class president; and Miyoko Sahara, a kind girl who was the only one attempting to befriend Shouko years before. They also make new friends in Tomohiro Nagatsuka, a similarly friendless fat boy who owes Shoya; and Satoshi Mashiba, Miki's crush.

The seven begin to work together when Tomohiro's plan to create a film for a competition, which he plans to only include Shoya and himself, attracts the attention of Naoka, Miki, Tomohiro, and Satoshi, with Shoya additionally inviting Shouko to join the project. Throughout the filming, the seven face their personal challenges and conflicts. Shouko eventually tries to confess her love to Shoya, but it does not get through to him and ends up in a misunderstanding. The group also has a falling out when Shoya tries to isolate himself again by insulting the crew, leading to Shouko feeling sorry for him. As she believes she is the sole reason for the parting of the group, Shouko attempts to kill herself and is rescued by Shoya, who gets badly hurt in the process, falling into a coma. This impacts the other six of the group as they start to resolve their problems while suspending the project until Shoya awakens. Once he recovers, Shoya reconciles with his film crew and finally completes the film, which, while a failure, has greatly helped him and his friends.

A year after their high school graduation and their subsequent parting ways, the seven reunite for the Coming of Age Day. By then, Shoya has stopped ignoring the people around him and now has a lot of friends. At the end of the Age Day, Shoya and Shouko are seen going into their elementary school reunion together holding hands so that Shouko will feel less nervous.

== Characters ==
Shoya Ishida (石田 将也, Ishida Shōya)
The main character and narrator. In elementary school, he leads his class in bullying Shouko. When the bullying gets the attention of higher school authorities, the class turns Shoya into a scapegoat so they will not have to also take responsibility. As a result, he becomes ostracized and bullied by his former friends. Shoya starts to ignore those around him (imagining them with a large X across their face). Upon meeting her in high school, he eventually apologizes to Shouko, becoming fluent in sign language specifically to do so, and begins to spend time with her. Shoya feels like he has not been punished enough for bullying Shouko and often wishes he could stop his younger self. He also feels resigned to the fact that he will never be able to have friends again. As the series progresses, Shoya and Shouko reconnect with their former classmates, in the process making amends with them and facing the lingering effects from their pasts. Shoya is suicidal when he is in highschool and has crumbling depression.
Shouko Nishimiya (西宮 硝子, Nishimiya Shōko)
The other main character, Shouko is a deaf girl who is bullied by Shoya in elementary school to the point of needing to transfer away. Years later, Shoya searches for her to apologize. Although Shouko holds a bit of resentment towards him, she accepts his apology and starts to spend time with him. She almost never gets angry with her attackers and even smiles at them; though some characters, in particular Ueno, get very annoyed by this and accuse her of faking them. She often blames herself for being bullied or thinks she is a burden to others, leading to depressive or suicidal mindsets, and struggles with forgiving herself. After a while, Shouko falls in love with Shoya and, at one point, tries to declare this, but due to her speech impediment, he fails to understand her. At the end of the series, after having studied in Tokyo for a while, Shouko returns to her hometown and reunites with Shoya for the Coming of Age Day.
Naoka Ueno (植野 直花, Ueno Naoka)
A girl from Shoya and Shouko's elementary school who helps bully Shouko. She continues to be friends with many of their classmates after they separate themselves from Shoya. Ueno watches Shoya becoming a loner throughought middle school and believes their sadness, from her having to cut off contact with Shoya to him hating everyone, including her, has all been because of Shouko. She runs into Shoya years later and tries to reintroduce him to past classmates. Ueno has a crush on Shoya since they were kids, which cause her to become jealous and resentful towards Shouko. Despite being within the group of friends, Shoya still does not trust her until after his release from the hospital, when she finally apologizes to him for all she did wrong. After graduation, Ueno is dragged by Sahara to become her assistant as a model. By the epilogue, it is shown that her time in Tokyo has somewhat diminished her mean personality, though it still exists.
Miki Kawai (川井 みき, Kawai Miki)
Nicknamed "Kawaiichi", Kawai is the school representative at Shoya's elementary school. She is popular and normally takes charge of situations. She has a kind facade, but is secretly a narcissist, believing that everyone should love her, and wants to be the victim in every problem she faces. Though she does not directly bully Shouko, Kawai does nothing to intervene and even laughs alongside her friends. She leads the class in scapegoating Shoya after Shouko's transfer, leading to his isolation. In high school, Kawai joins Shoya's friend group, bringing Mashiba, whom she has a crush on, along. Instead of facing that she contributed to Shouko's bullying, she once again uses Shoya as a scapegoat and plays the victim, leading to him falling out of his new friend group. This time, however, the consequences fall back on her when her classmates become disgusted and bully her after she suggests they make paper cranes as a wish of recovery for Shoya, who is hospitalized after saving Shouko. Having experienced getting bullied for the first time, Kawai resolves to become more empathetic with others. Near the end of the series, she decides to follow Mashiba to take up teaching classes.
Miyoko Sahara (佐原 みよこ, Sahara Miyoko)
A kind girl from Shoya and Shouko's elementary school. She is the only student willing to make an effort to learn sign language and befriend Shouko; however, this singles her out for bullying too, causing her to take the rest of her classes in the nurse's office. Shoya finds Sahara several years later so she can reconnect with Shouko and become her friend again. Sahara has grown very tall and, due to her high heel boots, appears even taller. After Shoya, Sahara spends the most time with the Nishimiya family; however, their relationship is briefly strained when Shoya decides to cut ties with his friends by insulting them, claiming that Sahara is always the first to run away from a problem. Sahara later texts Shoya asking how he could prove that he has grown up, if he cut ties with his friends for no reason. Fed up of Ueno always blaming Shouko for everything, she chooses to take Shouko's side and defends her from being attacked by Ueno during Shoya's hospitalization. After graduating from high school, Sahara goes to Tokyo to become a runway model, bringing Ueno with her.
Yuzuru Nishimiya (西宮 結絃, Nishimiya Yuzuru)
Shouko's protective younger sister who is currently a middle school student. When her mother attempted to cut a young Shouko's hair short to look like a boy and appear tougher, Yuzuru started portraying herself as a boy on Shouko's behalf to defend her, and initially introduces herself to Shoya as Shouko's boyfriend. Yuzuru is extremely protective of her big sister and has a deep hatred of all the people who ever bullied her, such as Shoya. However, upon learning that Shoya has changed, she mellows down and helps him reunite with his old classmates. Yuzuru often ditches school and runs away from home to take photos of dead animals and insects, putting strain between her relationship with her mother. It is revealed that she only took these photos to show her sister how horrible death is and not try to kill herself. This is proven to be a futile effort, however, as Shouko attempts to commit suicide anyway, though she is rescued by Shoya in the last minute. Yuzuru later pursues photography and wins a photo contest.
Tomohiro Nagatsuka (永束 友宏, Nagatsuka Tomohiro)
A short, fat and lonely boy at Shoya's high school. When someone tries to steal his bike, Shoya offers his to be taken instead. Nagatsuka sees this act of kindness as an unbreakable act of friendship and proclaims himself Shoya's best friend. He is shown to be quite obsessive and protective of Shoya, and sometimes dislikes him befriending other people. However, Nagatsuka is also supportive of Shoya and often offers advice. He and Yuzuru try to encourage Shoya and Shouko to go out with each other, and are often disappointed by Shoya's repulsion towards romance. He has plans to become a millionaire, so he is willing to hand out money to friends, and is keen to become a film director, entering himself and Shoya into a film competition. Though his film proves to be a failure, this only makes Nagatsuka resolve to take up film studies as his college degree.
Satoshi Mashiba (真柴 智, Mashiba Satoshi)
A boy who is interested in and joins Shoya's group of friends upon learning they are making a movie. Mashiba was lonely as a child and the other children took him for granted and bullied him. Now, he is completely intolerant of bullies in any form and, while generally calm and level headed, reacts violently to any random act of bullying he sees. He is blatantly ignoring Kawai's crush on him even when Shoya points it out. After finding out about Shoya's bullying history, he calmly punches Shoya in the face. It is later revealed that Mashiba befriended Shoya because of his social awkwardness and never being able to fit in at school despite trying to; by hanging out with Shoya, whom he believed is even stranger than he is, he would appear normal. However, this only makes him feel that he should be the least important amongst the group. Mashiba is the first to reconcile with Shoya upon his release from hospital and later studies to become a teacher after graduation.
Yaeko Nishimiya (西宮 八重子, Nishimiya Yaeko)
Shouko and Yuzuru's mother. A cold woman, she caught a virus from her husband when she was pregnant with Shouko, leaving her deaf. Her husband filed for divorce when she was pregnant with Yuzuru, leaving her to raise her daughters as a single mother, though she was offered help by her mother, Ito. Eventually, Ito took care of the children permanently while Yaeko worked, creating a distance between Yaeko and her daughters. She prolongs Shouko's stay at the elementary school where she is bullied in the hopes it would toughen her up and prepare her for how people would treat her. She hates Shoya and feels he can never atone for the happy school years he stole from her daughter. Upon seeing him again years after Shouko's transfer, she slaps him. However, after her mother's death, she begins to warm up to Shoya and thanks him for being Yuzuru's friend.
Ito Nishimiya (西宮 いと, Nishimiya Ito)
Shouko and Yuzuru's maternal grandmother. A caring, wise woman, she raised Shouko and Yuzuru after their father left, as their mother, Yaeko, had to take up full-time work. She bought Yuzuru her first camera and tries to convince her that her mother means well for both her and her sister. Ito dies of old age, leaving a letter that Yuzuru asks Shoya to read at the funeral. The letter tries one last time to convince Yuzuru to forgive her mother, but she grows angry and does not hear the end of it.
Miyako Ishida (石田 美也子, Ishida Miyako)
A kind and loving single mother of Shoya and his older sister who owns a hair salon. She is disappointed upon learning that Shoya bullied Shouko, as she has to pay 1.7 million yen for all the hearing aids Shoya broke. When Shoya pays her back with the intention of killing himself afterwards, she reveals that she is aware of his plans, threatening to burn the money if he tries to kill himself again, thus leaving her with nothing. Unfortunately, she accidentally burns the money anyway. She cares for her granddaughter, Maria, as well as Shoya, and often lets Yuzuru stay around the house. After Shoya ends up in a coma, she feels awkward around Shouko, despite trying to remain polite, though the two get closer after Shoya wakes up. She is later shown to have befriended Yaeko Nishimiya, as well, often drinking with her together.
Kazuki Shimada (島田 一旗, Shimada Kazuki)
Shoya's best friend in elementary school, who helps him bully Shoko. When she moves away, Shimada places all the blame on Shoya and soon turns into the ringleader of the people bullying Shoya: frequently stealing his shoes, beating him up, and writing threats and cruel things on his desk in chalk every morning. Ueno wants Shoya and Shimada to be friends again and gets Shoya to the amusement park were Shimada is now working, but Shoya storms away, deciding he does not care about Shimada and does not want to be his friend again. When Shoya falls while saving Shouko, Shimada sees him and saves him from the river. However, Shoya never learns this because he is unconscious at that time, and Shimada asks Shouko, who is a witness, not to tell him about it. Even so, Ueno tells Shoya about what had happened anyway. Shimada is shown at the Coming of Age day, shortly before the manga's end.
Keisuke Hirose (広瀬 啓祐, Hirose Keisuke)
Shoya's other best friend in elementary school who often goes alongside him in his "life-challenging activities". Like Shimada, Hirose cuts ties with Shoya after Shouko's transfer. Hirose stays close with Shimada (and possibly Ueno as well) after graduation and, along with him, brings Shoya from a river after he falls down from saving Shouko.
Takeuchi (竹内)
Shoya's teacher at elementary school. He is a shallow man who finds Shouko's presence in the school unfair to the other pupils. While he is disappointed in Shoya for bullying Shouko, he still laughs at the jokes made about her. After her transfer, he supports the class to turn Shoya into a scapegoat and refuses to believe him when he claims he is being bullied too. Years later, Shoya runs into Takeuchi again when looking for locations for the film. Takeuchi says that Shoya has grown into a fine young man and all the bad things in his past have changed Shoya for the better. Mashiba dislikes how Takeuchi talks about Shouko and throws his drink into Takeuchi's face, costing them the chance to film at the school, though with Shoya's later hospitalization and Mashiba's apology to him, Takeuchi allows them to shoot anyway.
Kita (喜多)
Shoya's music teacher in elementary school. As Sahara is among the students, Kita is the only one among the teachers willing to get along with Shouko despite her deafness. She attempts to make the class learn sign language for Shouko's sake, but her proposal is rejected by Takeuchi and the class. Later, Kita also includes Shouko to take part in the school choir, but despite trying hard to teach her, Shouko ends up ruining the song and making the school lose the choir competition.
Maria Ishida (石田 マリア, Ishida Maria)
Shoya's young niece who lives with Shoya and his family. Maria is half-Japanese from her mother's side and half-Brazilian from her father's side. She gains a constant wonder about the difference between things that are dead and alive. After Shoya's fall, she fears he might be dead, so Yuzuru takes it upon herself to teach her the difference, being an expert on the matter.
Shoya's sister (将也の姉, Shōya no Ane)
Shoya's older sister. She is significantly older than him, as she already graduated from college when he is still in elementary school. Curiously, she is the only character with lines whose face is never seen; even her husband and daughter are shown and get more screen time than her. According to Shoya, his sister has dated numerous men, one of whom has a younger brother who was bullied by Shoya; this event probably led to his breakup with her. Later, she dates a Brazilian man named Pedro; this time, her relationship sticks, and she has a daughter, Maria, with him. The final chapter reveals that she is expecting her second child with Pedro.

== Media ==
=== Manga ===
A Silent Voice began as a manga written and illustrated by Yoshitoki Ōima and was originally published as a one-shot in the February 2011 issue of Bessatsu Shōnen Magazine. It was later turned into a full manga series and began serialization in the combined 36-37th issue of Weekly Shōnen Magazine, released on August 7, 2013, and ended its run on the 51st issue of the magazine on November 19, 2014. The series was compiled in seven tankōbon volumes which were published by Kodansha in Japan between November 15, 2013, and December 17, 2014. Kodansha USA licensed the series for an English release in North America with the first volume being released in Q2 2015 and with subsequent volumes released every two months following. Crunchyroll Manga had earlier obtained the series for a digital English release. Kodansha Comics collected all seven volumes in a box set containing a poster and a replica of Shouko's notebook from the series, and released it on December 19, 2017.

The series was re-released in two hard cover collected editions featuring higher print quality and bonus segments. Book 1 came out October 2021, and book 2 in 2022.

==== Volume list ====
No.	Original release date	Original ISBN	English release date	English ISBN
1	November 15, 2013	978-4-06-394973-5	May 26, 2015	978-1-63-236056-4
Chapter 1: Shoya Ishida (石田将也, Ishida Shōya); Side Story: 7 Months Earlier (番外編 7か月前, Bangai-hen 7-kagetsu Mae); Chapter 2: Just One of Those Things (仕方の無いこと, Shikata no Nai koto); Chapter 3: Hahahahaha (ははははは); Chapter 4: Nishimiya, You Piece of Shit (クソったれ西宮, Kusottare Nishimiya); Chapter 5: Reject (拒絶人間, Kyozetsu Ningen)
2	January 17, 2014	978-4-06-395004-5	July 28, 2015	978-1-63-236057-1
Chapter 6: Why? (どうして, Doushite); Chapter 7: I Gave Up Once Before (諦めたけど, Akirametakedo); Chapter 8: "Friends?" (友達って, Tomodachi tte); Chapter 9: The Right To Be Here (会う資格, Au Shikaku); Chapter 10: That's Just Great (よかったよかった, Yokatta yokatta); Chapter 11: That Face (そんな顔, Sonna Kao); Chapter 12: Sis (姉ちゃん, Nēchan); Chapter 13: Struggle (あがき, Agaki); Chapter 14: Yuzuru Nishimiya (西宮結絃, Nishimiya Yuzuru)
3	March 17, 2014	978-4-06-395036-6	September 29, 2015	978-1-63-236058-8
Chapter 15: Better News (嬉しいこと, Ureshīkoto); Chapter 16: What I Took From Her (奪ったもの, Ubatta mono); Chapter 17: Meaningful Presence (意味のある存在, Iminoaru Sonzai); Chapter 18: I Don't Care In The Least (全然興味ない, Zenzen Kyōminai); Chapter 19: How A Cat Feels (猫の気持ち, Nekonokimochi); Chapter 20: Reason (理由, Riyū); Chapter 21: Pretend Friends (友達ごっこ, Tomodachi-gokko); Chapter 22: I Want To Know (知りたい, Shiritai); Chapter 23: The Moon (月, Tsuki)
4	June 17, 2014	978-4-06-395111-0	November 24, 2015	978-1-63-236059-5
Chapter 24: Change (変化, Henka); Chapter 25: Just My Imagination (気のせい, Ki no Sei); Chapter 26: Birds Of A Feather (似たもの同士, Nitamonodōshi); Chapter 27: Hate (嫌い, Kirai); Chapter 28: Reply (返信, Henshin); Chapter 29: Granny (ばーちゃん, Bāchan); Chapter 30: Support (支え, Sasae); Chapter 31: Letter (手紙, Tegami); Chapter 32: Gum Syrup (ガムシロ, Gamushiro); Side Story: Sisters (番外編 姉妹, Bangai-hen Shimai)
5	August 16, 2014	978-4-06-395165-3	January 19, 2016	978-1-63-236060-1
Chapter 33: Big Friend "N" (ビッグフレンド"N", Biggu Furendo "N"); Chapter 34: I Don't Want To Go (行きたくない, Ikitakunai); Chapter 35: Respectable (立派な, Rippana); Chapter 36: What I Wanted (欲しかったもの, Hoshikatta mono); Chapter 37: Now And Forever (このままずっと, Kono mama zutto); Chapter 38: Jumping At Shadows (疑心暗鬼, Gishin Anki); Chapter 39: Just Some Passerby (所詮 他人, Shosen Tanin); Chapter 40: Pretend Date (デートごっこ, Dēto-gokko); Chapter 41: Everyone (みんな, Minna); Chapter 42: Fireworks (花火, Hanabi)
6	October 17, 2014	978-4-06-395221-6	April 19, 2016	978-1-63-236061-8
Chapter 43: Daredevil (度胸試し, Dokyōdameshi); Chapter 44: Blight (害悪, Gaiaku); Chapter 45: It Was All For Nothing? (無駄だった, Mudadatta?); Chapter 46: Tomohiro Nagatsuka (永束友宏, Nagatsuka Tomohiro); Chapter 47: Miyoko Sahara (佐原みよこ, Sahara Miyoko); Chapter 48: Miki Kawai (川井みき, Kawai Miki); Chapter 49: Satoshi Mashiba (真柴 智, Mashiba Satoshi); Chapter 50: Naoka Ueno (植野直花, Ueno Naoka); Chapter 51: Shoko Nishimiya (西宮硝子, Nishimiya Shōkō); Chapter 52: Silence (静寂, Shijima)
7	December 17, 2014	978-4-06-395268-1	May 31, 2016	978-1-63-236222-3
Chapter 53: To The Bridge (橋へ, Hashi e); Chapter 54: To You (君へ, Kimi e); Chapter 55: Homecoming (帰宅, Kitaku); Chapter 56: Going To School (登校, Tōkō); Chapter 57: Reunion (さいかい, Saikai); Chapter 58: Results (成果, Seika); Chapter 59: The Future (進路, Shinro); Chapter 60: Nobodies (何者, Nanimono); Chapter 61: Graduation (卒業, Sotsugyō); Chapter 62: A Silent Voice (聲の形, Koe no Katachi)

=== Film ===
The final chapter of the manga, published in the 51st issue of Weekly Shōnen Magazine in 2014, announced that an anime project for the series was in its planning stages. The seventh volume of the manga revealed that the project would be a theatrical film. It was later revealed in early October 2015 that Kyoto Animation would be producing an anime film based on the series, directed by Naoko Yamada and distributed by Shochiku. It was announced on the adaptation's official website that Reiko Yoshida is writing the film's scripts, Futoshi Nishiya is designing the characters. The film was released in Japan on September 17, 2016.

The English language adaptation features a deaf voice actress named Lexi Cowden playing the lead character.

== Reception ==
The first tankobon volume sold 31,714 copies within the first week of release, ranking number 19 on the Oricon manga chart. Its second volume ranked 12 selling 60,975 in its first week. As of March 2014, the tankobon volumes sold 700,000 copies in Japan. In France, A Silent Voice sold 131,000 copies in 2015 and 85,000 copies in 2016, adding up to 216,000 copies sold in France as of 2016.

=== Awards and nominations ===
A Silent Voice received an award for "Best Rookie Manga" in 2008. The vector of the content made it difficult for publication on any manga magazine until it was picked up after months of legal dispute by the February edition of Bessatsu Shōnen Magazine, where it won first place. Due to the subject matter, the serialization has been reviewed and supported by the Japanese Federation of the Deaf. It was nominated for the 8th Manga Taishō.

In February 2015, Asahi Shimbun announced that A Silent Voice was one of nine nominees for the nineteenth annual Tezuka Osamu Cultural Prize. The manga went on to win the New Creator Prize. In April 2016, it was announced that A Silent Voice was nominated for the Best U.S. Edition of International Material-Asia award in the 2016 Eisner Awards.
