= Chiikawa the Movie: The Secret of the Mermaid Island Original Soundtrack =

Chiikawa the Movie: The Secret of the Mermaid Island Original Soundtrack Japanese: 「映画ちいかわ 人魚の島のひみつ」オリジナル・サウンドトラック

Soundtrack album by Shugo Tokumaru and Chikara Uemizutaru
- Released: July 24, 2026
- Studio: QTORY inc.
- Genres: J-pop, Soundtrack
- Length: 66:39
- Label: QTORY inc.

Chiikawa the Movie: The Secret of the Mermaid Island Original Soundtrack (Japanese: 「映画ちいかわ 人魚の島のひみつ」オリジナル・サウンドトラック) is a 2026 soundtrack album for the film Chiikawa the Movie: The Secret of the Mermaid Island based on Nagano's original manga work. It is created by Shugo Tokumaru and Chikara Uemizutaru, and U-zhaan for tabla parts.

The soundtrack album was released on 24 July, 2026, the same day as the film's Japanese premiere. It topped the Oricon weekly digital albums ranking in August 2026, and later topped the Billboard Japan Hot Albums chart for the week of 10–16 August 2026. This made it the first soundtrack in seven years to achieve this milestone on Billboard Japan.

== Development ==
The soundtrack album is created by Shugo Tokumaru and Chikara Uemizutaru. They were designated by Nagano, the manga's original author. Tokumaru has participated in music for the work's TV anime adaption before. For the film's music, she specified that a theme song should be about an island, while arranged versions of the song should also be played during production.

== Track listing ==
While most trucks are incidental music, the soundtrack album includes "Kutsuzure", the theme song for Chiikawa; "Shima no uta" (Japanese: 島のうた), theme music of the film, "Tsukue sasuru" (Japanese: 机さする) sung by Haruka Aoki, and Farewell to This Day, a well-known Japanese music that was also used in Evangelion: 2.0 You Can (Not) Advance.

「映画ちいかわ 人魚の島のひみつ」オリジナル・サウンドトラック (ID: QTRY-0001)
No.	Title	Singers	Length
1.	"くつずれ"	Hachiware (Makoto Tanaka)	03:01
2.	"日常に一枚のチラシ"		01:12
3.	"し〜ま〜がっしゅく"		00:18
4.	"島のうた"	Islanders (島民)	01:20
5.	"島のくりまんじゅう"		00:33
6.	"島のラッコ"		00:43
7.	"島のシーサー"		00:53
8.	"島のふたり"		00:45
9.	"島のうた" (祭囃子ver.)		00:39
10.	"島のモモンガ"		00:38
11.	"今日の日はさようなら" (ハチワレver.)	Hachiware (Makoto Tanaka)	01:12
12.	"島のうた" (セイレーンver.)	Siren (Minori Suzuki), Mermaids (Saeko Ōki and Ayaka Nanase)	01:22
13.	"島のうた" (まちがえて襲っちゃったのver.)		00:47
14.	"何かおかしい"		00:41
15.	"セイレーン討伐のアナウンス"		01:20
16.	"島のうた" (討伐オファーver.)		00:39
17.	"セイレーンの襲撃"		03:30
18.	"先生を助けに行こう"		00:40
19.	"ヒトハとフタバに聞いてみる"		01:12
20.	"飴モモンガ"		00:52
21.	"セイレーンのアジト"		01:28
22.	"犯人連れてきてくれたの？"		00:34
23.	"セイレーンの嘆き"		02:35
24.	"うさぎラップ" (ソロver.)	Usagi (Ari Ozawa), Mermaids (Saeko Ōki and Ayaka Nanase)	00:48
25.	"心を無にして...忍耐だ！"		01:00
26.	"逃げたけど…"		00:55
27.	"橋の上の戦い"		00:52
28.	"セイレーンからは逃げられない..."		01:18
29.	"ひとりぼっちのちいかわ"		01:19
30.	"島二郎登場"		00:14
31.	"島二郎の回想（セイレーンと人魚か...）"		00:51
32.	"島二郎の回想（心当たりがある）"		00:28
33.	"イーヤーヤダヤダ！"		00:33
34.	"アジト潜入"		02:32
35.	"島二郎VSセイレーン"		00:46
36.	"作戦を練ろう"		00:54
37.	"クッキング"		01:49
38.	"不思議な歌声"		01:02
39.	"決戦前夜"		00:20
40.	"島のうた" (セイレーンのアカペラver.)	Siren (Minori Suzuki), Mermaids (Saeko Ōki and Ayaka Nanase)	00:33
41.	"ファイナル・カレーバトルⅠ"		01:14
42.	"島二郎参上！"		00:58
43.	"ファイナル・カレーバトルⅡ"		00:25
44.	"うさぎラップ" (リズム感のある者たちver.)	Usagi (Ari Ozawa), Momonga (Yuka Iguchi), Mermaids (Saeko Ōki and Ayaka Nanase)	01:15
45.	"ファイナル・カレーバトルⅢ"		01:30
46.	"夜明け"		00:46
47.	"ふたりのひみつ"		06:36
48.	"今日の日はさようなら" (合唱ver.)	Hachiware (Makoto Tanaka), Shisa (Miyuri Shimabukuro), Shimajirō (Tsuguo Mogami), islanders	03:09
49.	"出航の朝"		01:38
50.	"島のうた" (島二郎ver.)	Shimajirō (Tsuguo Mogami), islanders	01:15
51.	"家路へ"		00:47
52.	"机さする"	Haruka Aoki	03:58
Total length:			66:39

== Reception ==
Anime! Anime! described the music in Chiikawa in overall as "slightly unusual". It suggested that the anime's melodies "may sounded cheerful once, but have an entirely different meaning later". It also commented that while the music sounds accessible at first, listeners would found unusual turns when listen them closely, which fits both the world of Chiikawa and Tokumaru's music style.

Mayumi Tsuchida of Mikiki complimented the music created by Tokumaru and Uemizutaru, saying it contributed the film's wide imagination. They suggested that the music serves the film's narrative well. Tsuchida specifically prised "Shima no uta" in particular, indicating that the song's different variants illustrate how the island of the film evolves.

=== Charts ===
The soundtrack album was released on 24 July, 2026, the day the film released in Japan. It had topped the Oricon weekly digital albums ranking in August 2026. It later topped the Billboard Japan Hot Albums chart for the week of 10–16 August 2026, becoming the first soundtrack album in nearly seven years to reach number one on the chart.

Chart (2026)	Peak position
Oricon weekly digital albums ranking (Oricon)	1
Billboard Japan Hot Albums (Billboard Japan)	1
