= Cypic =

Japanese animation studio

Cypic Co., Ltd.
- Native name: 株式会社Cypic
- Romanized name: Kabushiki-gaisha Saipiku
- Formerly: CygamesPictures Co., Ltd. (2016-2026)
- Type: Kabushiki-gaisha
- Industry: Japanese animation
- Founded: April 5, 2016; 10 years ago
- Headquarters: Shakujimachi, Nerima, Tokyo, Japan
- Key people: Nobuhiro Takenaka (president); Joji Seita (director); Takahiro Yamauchi (director)
- Products: Animation planning and production
- Parent: CyberAgent
- Divisions: Cypic Records
- Website: cypic.co.jp

Cypic Co., Ltd. (Japanese: 株式会社Cypic, Hepburn: Kabushiki-gaisha Saipiku) is a Japanese animation studio subsidiary of CyberAgent. It was originally established by Cygames as CygamesPictures Co., Ltd. (株式会社CygamesPictures, Kabushiki-gaisha Saigēmusu Pikuchāzu) to produce anime adaptations of the company's gaming IPs such as Princess Connect! Re:Dive and Umamusume: Pretty Derby. The studio later expanded their operations to produce original anime, in addition to adapting manga series not owned by Cygames.

== Establishment ==
In 2015, Cygames announced the creation of its own anime production division to produce anime for their gaming IPs, along with original anime. In 2016, Cygames announced the creation of its own anime studio, named CygamesPictures, with their anime production division merging with the studio.

In 2026, CygamesPictures was consolidated as a subsidiary under Cygames' parent company CyberAgent through direct share acquisition, completed on February 27. The studio was renamed to Cypic on April 6, the day after the 10th anniversary of its founding. Following this, the studio also launched its own music label named Cypic Records.

== Works ==
=== Television series ===
| Title | Network | First run start date | First run end date | Director(s) | Animation producer(s) | Eps | Note(s) | Ref. |
|---|---|---|---|---|---|---|---|---|
| Manaria Friends | Tokyo MX | January 20, 2019 | March 24, 2019 | Hideki Okamoto | Shun Kashima | 10 | Based on the video game Rage of Bahamut. | |
| Princess Connect! Re:Dive (season 1) | Tokyo MX | April 7, 2020 | June 30, 2020 | Takaomi Kanasaki | Shun Kashima | 13 | Based on the video game of the same name. | |
| Princess Connect! Re:Dive (season 2) | Tokyo MX | January 11, 2022 | March 29, 2022 | Yasuo Iwamoto | Kenta Ueuchi | 12 | Sequel to Princess Connect! Re:Dive. | |
| The Idolmaster Cinderella Girls U149 | TV Tokyo | April 6, 2023 | June 29, 2023 | Manabu Okamoto | Kenta Ueuchi | 12 | Based on the slice of life manga by Kyowno. | |
| Brave Bang Bravern! | JNN (TBS) | January 11, 2024 | March 28, 2024 | Masami Ōbari | Souta Machiguchi | 12 | Original work. | |
| Umamusume: Cinderella Gray | JNN (TBS) | April 6, 2025 | December 21, 2025 | Yūki Itō; Takehiro Miura | Souta Machiguchi; Takuya Chikamatsu | 23 | Based on the sports manga written by Masafumi Sugiura. | |
| Apocalypse Hotel | Nippon TV | April 9, 2025 | June 25, 2025 | Kana Shundo | Kenta Ueuchi | 12 | Original work. | |
| The Summer Hikaru Died (season 1) | NNS (Nippon TV) | July 6, 2025 | September 28, 2025 | Ryōhei Takeshita | Kenta Ueuchi | 12 | Based on the horror manga by Mokumokuren. | |
| The World Is Dancing | Tokyo MX | July 2, 2026 | September 24, 2026 | Toshimasa Kuroyanagi | Kan Mizoguchi | 13 | Based on the historical manga by Kazuto Mihara. | |
| Kagurabachi | TBA | April 2027 | TBA | Tetsuya Takeuchi | Kan Mizoguchi | TBA | Based on the action manga by Takeru Hokazono. | |
| The Summer Hikaru Died (season 2) | TBA | TBA | TBA | TBA | TBA | TBA | Sequel to The Summer Hikaru Died. | |

=== Original net animation ===
| Title | Director(s) | Animation producer(s) | Release start date | Release end date | Eps | Note(s) | Ref. |
|---|---|---|---|---|---|---|---|
| Blade Runner Black Out 2022 | Shinichirō Watanabe | N/A | July 27, 2017 | July 27, 2017 | 1 | Part of a series of short films serving as prequels to Blade Runner 2049. | |
| Cinderella Girls 10th Anniversary Celebration Animation Eternity Memories | Hideki Nagamachi | Kenta Ueuchi | September 7, 2022 | September 7, 2022 | 1 | 10th anniversary animation to the video game The Idolmaster Cinderella Girls. | |
| Umamusume: Pretty Derby – Road to the Top | Chengzhi Liao | Kan Mizoguchi | April 16, 2023 | May 7, 2023 | 4 | Related to Umamusume: Pretty Derby. | |

=== Films ===
| Title | Director | Animation producer | Release date | Note(s) | Ref. |
|---|---|---|---|---|---|
| Umamusume: Pretty Derby – Beginning of a New Era | Ken Yamamoto | Kan Mizoguchi | May 24, 2024 | Related to Umamusume: Pretty Derby. | |
| Chiikawa the Movie: The Secret of the Mermaid Island | Kei Oikawa | Kan Mizoguchi | July 24, 2026 | Based on an arc from the slice of life manga Chiikawa by Nagano. | |

=== Music videos ===
| Title | Singer | Release date | Note(s) | Ref. |
|---|---|---|---|---|
| Follow Your Fantasy | May'n | December 17, 2021 | Created for the 10th anniversary of Cygames' founding. | |
| Feel Like | Eve | May 23, 2025 | | |

== See also ==
- Yostar Pictures, a similar animation studio that is also an animation subsidiary of a mobile game company
