= The Summer Hikaru Died =

Japanese manga series

- First tankōbon volume cover, featuring Hikaru Indou

光が死んだ夏 (Hikaru ga Shinda Natsu)
- Genre: Horror; Slice of life
- Manga
- Written by: Mokumokuren
- Published by: Kadokawa Shoten
- English publisher: NA: Yen Press
- Magazine: Young Ace Up
- Original run: August 31, 2021 – October 20, 2026
- Volumes: 9
- Novel series
- Written by: Mio Nukaga
- Illustrated by: Mokumokuren
- Published by: Kadokawa Shoten
- English publisher: NA: Yen Press
- Original run: December 4, 2023 – present
- Volumes: 2
- Anime television series
- Directed by: Ryōhei Takeshita
- Written by: Ryōhei Takeshita
- Music by: Taro Umebayashi
- Studio: Cypic
- Licensed by: Netflix (streaming rights)
- Original network: NNS (Nippon TV)
- Original run: July 6, 2025 – present
- Episodes: 12
- icon

The Summer Hikaru Died (Japanese: 光が死んだ夏, Hepburn: Hikaru ga Shinda Natsu) is a Japanese manga series written and illustrated by Mokumokuren. It was serialized on Kadokawa Shoten's Young Ace Up website from August 2021 to October 2026. As of June 2026, the series' individual chapters have been collected in nine tankōbon volumes, with the tenth and final volume set to be released on January 25th, 2027. It follows the story of Yoshiki Tsujinaka, a teenager in rural Japan who discovers that his friend Hikaru Indou has been replaced by an otherworldly entity, forcing him to navigate their changed relationship amid supernatural dangers.

Mokumokuren first conceived of the series while studying for exams and later began posting drawings on Twitter, which led to the Young Ace Up editorial department approaching Mokumokuren to serialize the manga via the Young Ace Up website. An anime television series adaptation produced by Cypic aired from July to September 2025. A second season has been announced.

Upon release of the first volume, the series became a critical and commercial success, with the first volume selling 200,000 copies in three months and receiving critical praise for the story, artwork, and characters.

Yen Press, the English-language publisher for the series, introduces the first volume with the following:

It has Hikaru’s face. It has Hikaru’s voice. It even has Hikaru’s memories. But whatever came down from the mountains six months ago isn’t Yoshiki’s best friend. Whatever it is, it’s dangerous. Carrying on at school and hanging out as if nothing has changed—as if Hikaru isn’t gone—would be crazy...but when it looks so very like Hikaru...and acts so very like Hikaru...

== Premise ==
Yoshiki Tsujinaka and Hikaru Indou are two teenage boys and childhood friends living in a small town in rural Japan. Despite having opposite personalities and different hobbies, the two maintain a close friendship. Yoshiki has romantic feelings for Hikaru, but is ashamed of this and keeps his feelings secret due to fears of facing rejection and homophobia from Hikaru and the rest of the town.

On a winter day, Hikaru is fatally injured while hiking in the mountains alone. Before he dies, a mysterious eldritch being comes across him and consumes him, taking control of his body. The being carries on the life of the now-dead Hikaru, pretending to be him, having kept all the memories of the original. While everyone else seems to be fooled, Yoshiki realizes rather quickly that this new "Hikaru" is different. Rather than reject him, Yoshiki chooses to stay and befriend "Hikaru". This is made difficult by the alien nature of "Hikaru", along with the threat posed by other supernatural beings and hunters of said beings. As the story progresses and Yoshiki comes to understand and accept "Hikaru", he begins to accept himself and his feelings for his friend as well.

== Characters ==
Hikaru Indou (忌堂 光, Indō Hikaru)
Voiced by: Yōtarō Negishi (audio drama, PV1), Hiro Shimono (PV2), KENN (PV3), Junya Enoki (PV4),, Shūichirō Umeda (anime), Yūki Urushiyama (Note: Ep. 3 credits) (young) (Japanese); Paul Castro Jr. (anime), Giselle Fernandez (young) (English), Hikaru Imamaki (stage play)
Yoshiki Tsujinaka (辻中 佳紀, Tsujinaka Yoshiki)
Voiced by: Tomohiro Ōno (audio drama, PV1), Yoshitsugu Matsuoka (PV2), Tomoaki Maeno (PV3), Koki Uchiyama (PV4), Chiaki Kobayashi (anime), Natsumi Kawaida (young) (Japanese); Kyle McCarley (anime), Abby Trott (young) (English), Junsei Motojima (stage play)
Asako Yamagishi (山岸朝子, Yamagishi Asako)
Voiced by: Yumiri Hanamori (Japanese); Jennifer Losi (English), May Tachibana (stage play)
Rie Kurebayashi (暮林理恵, Kurebayashi Rie)
Voiced by: Wakana Kowaka (Japanese); Dorothy Fahn (English), Umi Yamano (stage play)
Tanaka (田中)
Voiced by: Chikahiro Kobayashi (Japanese); Daman Mills (English), Mitsu Murata (stage play)
Yūta Maki (巻ゆうた, Maki Yūta)
Voiced by: Yoshiki Nakajima (Japanese); Jacob Hopkins (English), Keijyu Matsuo (stage play)
Yuuki Tadokoro (田所結希, Tadokoro Yūki)
Voiced by: Shion Wakayama (Japanese); Valerie Rose Lohman (English), Rio Sawada (stage play)

== Production ==
Mokumokuren first conceived the series while studying for high school entrance exams. After graduating, they began posting drawings on Twitter in their spare time in January 2021. They were later approached by the Young Ace Up editorial department to serialize the manga in Young Ace Up, which they accepted. Mokumokuren is a fan of action manga from Weekly Shōnen Jump and Weekly Young Jump, particularly Tokyo Ghoul.

While writing the story, Mokumokuren tried to keep the horror to a minimum by trying to appeal to people's emotions rather than just being scary. They also felt that the theme of the story added to the horror based on the suspension bridge effect, which states that it is easier to fall in love when feeling anxious or fearful. For the artwork, they tried to include onomatopoeia that are not often used, while also having stayed cautious to make sure it worked properly in the context of the story.

Mokumokuren initially introduced The Summer Hikaru Died in 2021 as a boys' love story. They later specified that the manga was never serialized as a boys' love story, instead describing the series as a "coming-of-age horror" with queer themes. This has been explained as a requirement due to the initial title of the pitched manga on Pixiv, which is no longer canon. In 2025, they stated on X (formerly Twitter) that it is not "not BL", instead it is up to the audience's interpretation.

=== Setting ===
Mokumokuren used their grandmother's hometown as model, where the houses were all packed tightly together and it was normal for the neighbors to come and go without permission. They got the inspiration during their visit to the region. As they wanted the characters to speak in a distinctive dialect, they looked for one that was "slightly different from Kansai dialect" and decided the setting based on place that is located in "mountainous area of Tokai region." As a result, the setting of the series became a fictional rural town located between mountains in Mie Prefecture with some characters speaking in Mie dialect.

== Plot ==
The series is roughly split into three main story arcs as defined by the author, with the final chapter serving as an epilogue for the series as a whole.

=== The "Daily Life" Arc ===
The Daily Life Arc covers chapters 1-16 of the manga, and primarily follows the journey of Yoshiki and "Hikaru" as they learn about one another. Meanwhile, others have noticed an increase in supernatural activity in the town, and are looking to uncover the cause and address it.

The story begins with Yoshiki revealing to "Hikaru" that he has known that he is different from the real Hikaru (Hikaru Indou). "Hikaru" is shocked, and pleads with Yoshiki to not say anything. Yoshiki chooses not to reject "Hikaru" because he does not want to face the grief of acknowledging Hikaru's death, whom he had romantic feelings for.

After the reveal, the new "Hikaru" talks more openly with Yoshiki about his experiences and struggles adapting to life as a human. His likes and dislikes differ significantly from those of the original Hikaru, and he is thrilled to experience the mundane aspects of everyday life. Yoshiki observes that "Hikaru" is much more open about his emotions than the old Hikaru ever was, and far more affectionate towards Yoshiki as well. "Hikaru" and Yoshiki share multiple intimate encounters, where "Hikaru" invites Yoshiki to feel his insides (his true form), an experience which both find pleasurable and both initiate at different points. Yoshiki likes "Hikaru", but is also ashamed of himself for liking him and for pretending nothing's wrong. He privately grieves the loss of the original Hikaru, and he worries about the harm "Hikaru" could cause to others.

Yoshiki's fear of "Hikaru" causing harm proves justified, as he is shown to have killed an old woman who learned his true identity. He also hurts Yoshiki at one point in an emotional outburst when he learns Yoshiki has been keeping a secret from him, although "Hikaru" shows remorse and shame for this, crying in his bed. Later though, "Hikaru" attempts to kill their friend Asako for uncovering his real identity. This drives Yoshiki to attempt to kill "Hikaru" by stabbing him, which does not work. Yoshiki then asks "Hikaru" to kill him instead. "Hikaru" realizes that he needs to value human life more, and so to protect Yoshiki and others, he weakens himself, pulling out half of his insides and entrusting them to Yoshiki.

Meanwhile, others have started to notice the increased supernatural activity. There are more sightings of "impurities", spirits that often cause harm to the townsfolk. Rie, a medium, contacts Yoshiki and questions him about his involvement, warning him against getting "mixed". Three men gather to discuss the "failure of the Indou ritual" and say that "it" has come down from the mountain. They call in Tanaka, a paranormal investigator to root out the cause of the supernatural activity.

=== The "Mystery Solving" Arc ===
The Mystery Solving Arc covers chapters 17-26 of the manga, and follows the efforts of Yoshiki and "Hikaru" to uncover what "Hikaru" really is, as he has almost no memories from before he woke up in Hikaru's body. They also learn more about the secrets the town has been hiding, and the secrets of the Indou family.

Yoshiki and "Hikaru" learn that their area has a centuries-long history of supernatural activity and strange rituals. It appears that different people practiced different rituals and held different beliefs about the cause of this supernatural activity, and how to address it. Many rituals surround an entity called "Nonuki-sama" or "Unuki-san". They wonder if this entity was "Hikaru". At one point in history, the villagers believed the entity to be a benevolent wish-granting god. At some point, this belief changed to seeing it as a curse god which must be appeased in order to avoid great catastrophe. The villagers made offerings to "Nonuki-sama", consisting of severed heads of dying villagers or murdered passing travellers. This confuses "Hikaru", who says he doesn't need any sort of offerings to be able to grant wishes. These offerings, now only symbolic, were made by the Indou family to atone for an ancestral sin, and Yoshiki and "Hikaru" realize that Hikaru died in an attempt to fulfill this ritual. They believe that it's possible that the presence of "Hikaru" on the mountain is what kept the impurities away from the town.

At one point, "Hikaru" loses control of himself, being drawn towards Yoshiki's soul, and attempts to consume it, before suddenly coming to and retreating. "Hikaru" is afraid of himself and doesn't want to hurt Yoshiki. In an effort to protect Yoshiki and the town, "Hikaru" declares to Yoshiki that he will return to the mountain. He tells Yoshiki that he loves him, not romantically nor platonically, but in his own way. Yoshiki gets angry and grabs "Hikaru", begging him to stay, saying he also cares deeply for "Hikaru", not as a replacement for the human Hikaru, but as his own person. They reconcile, deciding that they do not have to pretend to be normal.

=== The "Hole Closing" Arc ===
The Hole Closing Arc covers chapters 27-50 of the manga, and follows Yoshiki and "Hikaru" as they attempt to close the "holes" that the impurities are coming from in order to save the town.

Yoshiki expresses that he would like to run away with "Hikaru", but ultimately decides that he cannot abandon the town and let the people suffer at the hands of the impurities. Tanaka, a paranormal investigator who had previously been searching for "Hikaru", teams up with Yoshiki and "Hikaru" to stop the impurities from destroying the town. The three then set about closing the holes one at a time, with help from their friend Asako, and later the spirit medium Rie as well. They are able to close most of the holes, but in the process, "Hikaru" accidentally severely injures a little girl. "Hikaru" and Yoshiki become separated, and "Hikaru" comes to believe that Yoshiki truly hates him now. Meanwhile, Yoshiki comes out to Asako, revealing his attraction to the original Hikaru, and explaining how deeply he cares for the new "Hikaru".

Rie leads "Hikaru" into a trap set by a group of supernatural hunters called the Company. With "Hikaru" in her control, Satou, the leader of the group, sets about further breaking his will, to convince him to be compliant to the Company's demands. They want to use his wish-granting abilities for personal gain. When Yoshiki and Asako realize "Hikaru" is missing, they immediately set about finding him. They learn that the Company plans to expose him for what he is publicly in front of the entire village. Satou makes a wish to "Hikaru" to reveal his true form, which the townsfolk are horrified by. Yoshiki arrives seconds later, pushes through the crowd, and hugs "Hikaru" in his true form. He confesses his love for him, and makes a wish that "Hikaru" never has to grant another wish from anyone ever again. "Hikaru" then returns to his human form, and him and Yoshiki run away together.

"Hikaru" makes amends with his/Hikaru's mother, who knew all along that he wasn't the original Hikaru, but she chooses to accept him as her son too. Yoshiki and "Hikaru" go to close the final hole together. "Hikaru" takes in all the souls of the impurities, passing them back into the cycle of life, death, and rebirth. When him and Yoshiki return to the living world, both are mortally injured. "Hikaru" is able to fix his injuries using his supernatural powers, but in order to save Yoshiki's life, he feeds him the piece of himself which he had broken off earlier. Meanwhile, Yoshiki talks to the spirit of the original Hikaru, and tells him living is no longer hard for him because he has someone waiting for him. He comes out to Hikaru, who does not reciprocate his feelings but is accepting. They say their final goodbyes, and Yoshiki returns to the realm of the living.

=== Epilogue ===
Chapter 51, the final chapter of the manga, is an epilogue to the series. It opens with the townsfolk mourning the death of Hikaru Indou, who has been missing since the events of the previous chapter. None of the townsfolk remember Yoshiki, including his family, because of the effects of him having "mixed" with "Hikaru" so completely. The chapter then shows the fate of "Hikaru" and Yoshiki immediately after the events of the previous chapter. They have gone to live with Tanaka in the city for the time being, but they are finally free to live however they want. They are permanently bonded now, as Yoshiki literally is the 'other half' of "Hikaru". "Hikaru" says he wants a new name, Yoshiki suggests the name "Natsuki", which gets his approval, and asks where it comes from. Yoshiki tells a funny story about the name's origin, and the two burst out laughing. The manga ends with several shots of them smiling at each other and laughing together.

== Themes ==
=== Queerness ===
The author defines this story as a coming-of-age horror with queer themes. Certain scenes show the interplay between different primal feelings, disgust and eroticism, to depict the feeling of forbidden desire.

A review of the anime summarised it as "a cosmic horror wrapped in sweet feelings and queer disorientation".

The author has confirmed that it is a story with elements of both aromantic asexuality and homosexuality. "Hikaru" does not experience romantic desire. They depict both romantic and non-romantic feelings, and the author wants to display feelings simply without aggrandising romance. They do not intend on using the label queerplatonic as they do not use any label, but accept that others may use labels.

=== Normalcy/Monstrosity ===
The stated core of the story is "the fear of being unable to become ‘normal’, and of not having a place to belong".

The themes of normalcy also link into the queer themes. Yoshiki feels abnormal in part because of his sexuality, and his encounters with "Hikaru", the supposed monster, make him face the part of himself he sees as abnormal. However, it is intended for any type of person who feels they do not belong. Monstrosity is shown to be something that is the most terrifying not in itself, but in what it reflects back upon you, and forces you to examine.

The author released the following statement with the finale:

When serialization first started, I didn't know how to put into words what I wanted to draw, but now I feel like I don't even need to explain it. I’m deeply grateful to all the readers who have appreciated HGSN and engaged with it sincerely. There are no monsters in this world, but I send my blessings to those who nonetheless feel like monsters themselves.

== Media ==
=== Manga ===
Written and illustrated by Mokumokuren, the series began serialization on Kadokawa Shoten's Young Ace Up website on August 31, 2021. It ended with its 51st chapter on October 20, 2026. As of June 2026, the series' individual chapters have been collected in nine tankōbon volumes. The tenth and final volume is set to be released on January 25, 2027.

In September 2022, Yen Press announced that they licensed the series for English publication.

==== Volumes ====
No.	Original release date	Original ISBN	English release date	English ISBN
1	March 4, 2022	978-4-04-112273-0	July 18, 2023	978-1-9753-6054-2
Chapters 1–6; Bonus (特別編, Tokubetsu-hen)
2	October 4, 2022	978-4-04-112960-9	October 17, 2023	978-1-9753-7103-6
Chapters 7–11; Extra (特別編, Tokubetsu-hen)
3	June 2, 2023	978-4-04-113700-0	April 16, 2024	978-1-9753-9276-5
Chapters 12–16; Extra (特別編, Tokubetsu-hen); Q&A (質問コーナー, Shitsumon Kōnā)
4	December 4, 2023	978-4-04-114339-1	August 20, 2024	978-1-9753-9862-0
Chapters 17–21; Extra (特別編, Tokubetsu-hen)
5	June 4, 2024	978-4-04-114997-3	March 25, 2025	979-8-8554-1459-2
Chapters 22–26; Extra (特別編, Tokubetsu-hen); Q&A (質問コーナー, Shitsumon Kōnā)
6	December 4, 2024	978-4-04-115608-7	October 28, 2025	979-8-8554-1975-7
Chapters 27–31; Extra (特別編, Tokubetsu-hen); Q&A (質問コーナー, Shitsumon Kōnā)
7	July 4, 2025	978-4-04-115682-7	April 28, 2026	979-8-8554-3064-6
Chapters 32–36; Extra (特別編, Tokubetsu-hen)
8	December 27, 2025	978-4-04-116903-2	October 27, 2026	979-8-8554-3779-9
Chapters 37–41; Extra (特別編, Tokubetsu-hen)
9	June 4, 2026	978-4-04-117480-7	—	—
Chapters 42–46; Extra (特別編, Tokubetsu-hen)
10	January 25, 2027	978-4-04-117936-9	—	—
Chapters 47–51; Extra (特別編, Tokubetsu-hen)

=== Novel ===
A novelization of the manga series, written by Mio Nukaga, was published by Kadokawa Shoten on December 4, 2023. As of July 2025, two volumes have been released. At New York Comic Con 2024, Yen Press announced that they also licensed the novel for English publication.

No.	Original release date	Original ISBN	English release date	English ISBN
1	December 4, 2023	978-4-04-075085-9; 978-4-04-075092-7 (SE)	April 15, 2025	979-8-8554-1057-0
Prologue; Ch 1. "Hikaru Was Always There"; Ch 2. "Undeniably Hikaru"; Ch 3. "I Can't Help but Find Him Endearing"; Ch 4. "Hikaru Comes Pouring Down"; Ch 5. "I Could Finally Breathe"; Epilogue
2	July 4, 2025	978-4-04-075086-6; 978-4-04-075991-3 (SE)	May 12, 2026	979-8-8554-3403-3
Prologue; Ch 1. "I Don't Want to See His Face"; Ch 2. "From the Moment I Drove the Blade In"; Ch 3. "Hikaru's Gravestone Felt Cold"; Ch 4. "Dad Felt the Same"; Ch 5. "You Don't Need to Know"; Epilogue
3	January 25, 2027	—	—	—

=== Anime ===
An anime adaptation was announced on May 24, 2024. It was later revealed to be a television series produced by Cypic and directed by Ryōhei Takeshita with him also handling series composition, character designs and chief animation direction handled by Yuichi Takahashi, and "Dorodoro" animation handled by Masanobu Hiraoka. It aired from July 6 to September 28, 2025, on Nippon TV and its affiliates. (Note: Nippon TV listed the series premiere on July 5, 2025, at 24:55, which is effectively July 6 at 12:55 a.m. JST.) The opening theme song is "Saikai" (再会; "Reunion") by Vaundy, while the ending theme song is "Anata wa Kaibutsu" (あなたはかいぶつ; "You Are My Monster") by Tooboe. Netflix is streaming the series globally, while Abema is streaming it inside Japan for free.

After the airing of the final episode of the first season, a second season was announced. The series author again confirmed in November 2026 that work on the second season is underway.

==== Episodes ====
No.	Title	Directed by	Written by	Storyboarded by	Animation directed by	Original release date
1	"Replacement"; Transliteration: "Daitaihin" (Japanese: 代替品)	Ryōhei Takeshita	Ryōhei Takeshita	Ryōhei Takeshita	Yūichi Takahashi	July 6, 2025
After his mysterious disappearance on Mount Nisayama during the winter, Hikaru Indo seemingly returns to his rural village months later. However, his childhood friend Yoshiki Tsujinaka begins to notice strange inconsistencies in Hikaru's behavior, memories, and reactions. Confronting him, Yoshiki discovers that the real Hikaru is dead, and the one before him is a supernatural entity that has taken over Hikaru's body and mind. Despite his fear and grief, Yoshiki chooses to keep this secret, unwilling to let go of the person he loved. Meanwhile, ominous events begin to unfold around the village, as an elderly woman, Ms. Matsuura, recognizes Hikaru as a being of local legend; she violently accosts him and Yoshiki yelling about 'Nonuki-sama'. She is tormented by an unknown figure, and is later found dead, seemingly by suicide. A mysterious investigator named Tanaka takes interest in the village's disturbance, hinting at larger threats to come.
2	"Suspicion"; Transliteration: "Giwaku" (Japanese: 疑惑)	Mitsuhiro Osako	Oki Maruyama	Mitsuhiro Osako	Mai Watanabe & Ryunosuke Ouchi	July 13, 2025
Tanaka arrives to investigate the elderly woman's death, and surmises that an entity from the mountains has found its way into the village, and has found a way to hide in plain sight. Hikaru and Yoshiki, along with their friends Maki, Yuki and Asako, take a frightening shortcut through the woods to reach Maki's house, and Yoshiki and Hikaru become separated from the other two on their way back. Yoshiki catches sight of a strange entity with an elongated neck that seeks to latch onto him, but is protected by Hikaru at the last moment who "devours" it. Asako questions what happened, having heard the struggle, causing Hikaru to briefly consider killing her. The following day at school, Yoshiki inquires about what happened to the spirit. Hikaru allows Yoshiki to reach within his skin and feel what he really is within. Later, Yoshiki is confronted by a local, Rie Kurebayashi, who has the ability to sense supernatural occurrences; she recognizes that Yoshiki is spending time around something supernatural, but is unaware that the source is Hikaru, and warns him about staying close to such phenomena, stating that doing so will result in him becoming "mixed".
3	"Denial"; Transliteration: "Kyozetsu" (Japanese: 拒絶)	Asaka Yokoyama, Kohei Kido, & Ayumu Uwano	Ryōhei Takeshita	Asaka Yokoyama	Saori Yanaga, Guonian Wang, Akane Kasasagi & Hiroko Seigan	July 20, 2025
Yoshiki eventually begins texting Rie for help, with her revealing that she went through something similar. Her late husband returned to her life somehow, and while she was initially happy, it resulted in her son being wounded, which made her realize the gravity of being involved with the supernatural and that humans were not meant to stay in close proximity with such beings. She further reveals that she can sense a distortion affecting the village and local areas, and believes that the being within Hikaru was once responsible for keeping this distortion trapped upon the mountain it lived on and without its presence, the distortion is spreading. Yoshiki attempts to distance himself from Hikaru, but in doing so, the two end up in an argument, which ends with Hikaru accidentally suffocating Yoshiki for a moment and marking a permanent bruise on his arm with his grip. Hikaru retreats in regret, as Yoshiki comes to recognize that Hikaru is not the person he used to know, but someone new to the world, akin to a child. The two eventually make up, apologizing to each other, and Yoshiki resolves to help and support Hikaru.
4	"Summer Festival"; Transliteration: "Natsumatsuri" (Japanese: 夏祭り)	Yoshiyuki Shirahata	Oki Maruyama	Yoshiyuki Shirahata	Akira Okazaki, Aoi Maekawa, Reia Nihei, Guonian Wang & Studio Mindo	July 27, 2025
Yoshiki's friend Asako Yamagishi correctly detects a spirit near some local train tracks that Rie later removes. Yoshiki and Hikaru attend the Summer Festival alongside Yoshiki's younger sister Kaoru, where the villagers gossip about their parents' unhappy marriage and Kaoru's continued absence from school. Tanaka continues his investigation of the town, and his pet hamster detects Hikaru's presence at the festival. Members of the village worry about a ritual Hikaru was supposed to perform in the woods that only the male members of his family can enact. Hikaru is prevented from entering the local shrine by a mysterious barrier that was erected by Tanaka. Yoshiki reminisces about the original Hikaru, before breaking down in grief. He reveals that he discovered Hikaru's corpse, and Hikaru comforts him. A post-credit scene depicts Hikaru slipping and fatally wounding himself in the forest, and as he dies, he imagines Yoshiki and begs the spirits to make sure he will not be left alone.
5	"Wig Ghost"; Transliteration: "Katsura no Obake" (Japanese: カツラのオバケ)	Wang Chihsia & Ryūta Kawahara	Ryōhei Takeshita	Wang Chihsia & Ryūta Kawahara	Guonian Wang, Mai Watanabe, Reia Nihei, Akira Okazaki & Chika Nōmi	August 3, 2025
Yoshiki's little sister Kaoru becomes terrified after encountering a sentient clump of hair in the bathroom. Hikaru invites Yoshiki to stick his hand in his chest again, who enjoys it at first, but rejects Hikaru after he attempts to feel back. Later, whilst out with their friend Maki, Hikaru agrees to exorcise the Tsujinaka bathroom. After Hikaru has remained in the bathroom for a long time, Yoshiki discovers him seemingly drowned before being pulled through the bath by the spirits. Yoshiki finds himself in a strange reality full of giant brains which mock him with insults he received throughout his life, and then relives a childhood memory where he and Hikaru got into a physical fight over the death of their pet bird Crowly. In reality, Yoshiki begins drowning Hikaru in the bath, biting his arm and leaving a mark, before Hikaru manages to remove the Wig Ghost from Yoshiki's mind. The pair then eat dinner with Kaoru and their mom, where Yoshiki considers the damage he could have caused. In a post credit scene, Tanaka summons an impurity to track down Hikaru.
6	"Asako" (Japanese: 朝子)	Fumiaki Kataoka & Shinya Kawabe	Oki Maruyama	Fumiaki Kataoka	KAGO, Saori Yanaga, Gorō Taki, Akane Kasasagi, Aoi Maekawa, Hiroko Seigan, Renta Inoue & Chen Zitu	August 10, 2025
At his friend's prompting, Hikaru hosts a sleepover at his house with Yoshiki, Asako, Maki and Yuki. Meanwhile, Tanaka's impurity begins its search. At the sleepover, Yoshiki discovers a mysterious note in Hikaru's bedroom and takes it with him. The group plays with sparklers, but their lighter breaks, so Asako volunteers to go and buy a new one with Hikaru. Like other members of her family, Asako has been able to sense the spirit world since childhood, with her special ability being her hearing; as she and Hikaru are walking together, she asks him who he really is. In response, Hikaru attempts to kill Asako but is interrupted by Yoshiki, causing her to simply pass out. Yoshiki confronts Hikaru, who reveals his lack of understanding about the difference between life and death. Hikaru also admits that he murdered Ms. Matsuura, causing Yoshiki to vomit. Asako awakens and accuses Hikaru of having been possessed by a ghost, but understands he is protective of Yoshiki. Yoshiki comforts Asako before coldly leaving for his home. The following morning, Hikaru privately ponders the meaning of life and his feelings towards Yoshiki. To his shock, Yoshiki arrives to pick him up for school as usual.
7	"Determination"; Transliteration: "Ketsui" (Japanese: 決意)	Yuka Hashimoto	Ryōhei Takeshita	Ryōhei Takeshita	Kyoko Niimura & Renta Inoue	August 17, 2025
On the day of the school choir competition, Yoshiki suggests to Hikaru that they skip school together. The two spend the day doing activities such as going to the movies, although Hikaru is unnerved by Yoshiki's strange behavior and insistence that he is not upset about the previous night. Later, they return to Yoshiki's house. As Hikaru watches a video of their class's choir from earlier that day, Yoshiki produces a knife and stabs Hikaru in the chest. Realising that Hikaru has not been fatally injured by this, Yoshiki asks that Hikaru turn the knife on him, admitting that he had been planning this from the start and wanted to make Hikaru's last day full of happy memories. Hikaru is conflicted by the request and chooses not to adhere to it; instead, he reaches into his chest and removes what he describes as "half of his insides" and offers the flesh to Yoshiki, explaining that this has made him weaker and less dangerous. He tells Yoshiki that he has felt accepted by him and is starting to learn the value of human life thanks to their friendship. Yoshiki takes the offering and says he wants to do research to learn more about what Hikaru really is.
8	"Contact"; Transliteration: "Sesshoku" (Japanese: 接触)	Ryo Ando	Oki Maruyama	Ryo Ando	Ryunosuke Ouchi, Mai Watanabe, Reia Nihei, Yuka Hashimoto, Akira Okazaki & Saori Yanaga	August 24, 2025
Yoshiki shows Hikaru the note he took from his bedroom. It mentions a "nuki-sama" that they theorize to be the "Nonuki-sama" that Ms. Matsuura spoke of. Hikaru's grandfather recognizes the note, asking them where "Hichi-san" has gone and mentioning a "murder village". At school, a guilty Yoshiki learns that Asako is experiencing hearing loss due to Hikaru's attempt on her life. Later, Yoshiki’s class witnesses a naked man commit suicide in the schoolyard; Asako senses he was possessed and continues to accuse Hikaru of also being possessed. Yoshiki and Hikaru visit the library to study an old map of the area and realise that the villages correspond to body parts. The librarian is Ms. Matsuura's daughter, who recognizes the name Nonuki-sama; she describes it as a god that used to bless people, but became a "curse god" after a famine. She reveals that her sister's disappearance in the mountain led her mother to fear a supernatural being. Later, Tanaka approaches Yoshiki under false pretences; he notices the markings on Yoshiki's arm and privately concludes that Yoshiki has "mixed" with the entity. At a diner, Hikaru reveals the piece of himself he gave to Yoshiki could kill Hikaru if broken. Tanaka's impurity threatens the pair and Hikaru cannot defeat it in his weakened state, but Rie saves them.
9	"Old Man Takeda"; Transliteration: "Takeda no Jīsan" (Japanese: 武田の爺さん)	Mitsuhiro Osako & Ayumu Uwano	Oki Maruyama	Mitsuhiro Osako, Wang Chihsia & Shu Manzawa	Studio Mindo	September 7, 2025 (Note: This episode was delayed one week from its originally scheduled air date of August 31, 2025.)
Rie takes Yoshiki and Hikaru to her house; she describes impurities as ghostly spirits that she sends back to their own world. Rie believes that Hikaru is attracting impurities, and explains how her husband came back from the dead like Hikaru: when he attacked their son, she realised he was little more than an impurity. Hikaru declares his resolve to protect the place he now feels at home in, and Yoshiki says he will stand by him. Meanwhile, Tanaka's impurity gives him its memories of Yoshiki and Hikaru at the diner. Rie speaks to Hikaru alone, warning him that if Yoshiki continues to mix, he will be unable to return to the human world. Yoshiki makes a grave for the real Hikaru, and Hikaru asks if he had romantic feelings for him. They discuss the differences between the two Hikarus, and Yoshiki muses that he doesn't want to force Hikaru to fit into human norms. Hikaru considers returning to the mountain to protect the village, but Yoshiki insists the impurities are at fault. The two visit Old Man Takeda, who tells them that the attacking impurities stem from a blasphemous act committed by the Indo family generations ago. Hikaru's lack of understanding about his family history angers the man, who blames his failure for the recent tragedies. Suddenly, Takeda transforms and attacks the pair with a sword. Tanaka arrives and saves them, only to take the sword and cut off Hikaru's head.
10	"Truth"; Transliteration: "Shinsō" (Japanese: 真相)	Wang Chihsia & Kōhei Kido	Oki Maruyama	Yutaka Uemura & Hiromi Taniguchi	Akira Okazaki, Mai Watanabe, Hiroko Seigan, Aoi Maekawa, Kyoko Niimura & Chen Zitu	September 14, 2025
The "Hikaru" entity swarms the room until Yoshiki forcibly reattaches Hikaru's head. Yoshiki falls unconscious and awakens in the hospital with Hikaru. Hikaru remains unconscious, with evidence of his decapitation barely visible. Meanwhile, Tanaka speaks with Takeda's son. Two days later, Yoshiki and Rie visit Hikaru; as he wakes, his spirit reaches to attack Yoshiki, but is stopped by Rie. They learn of a mysterious disappearance at a tunnel of human bones, where the heads of the skeletons were removed. When the boys return to school, Maki recognizes the name "Unuki" as being related to an abortion drug used in a time of famine, as it was the godly figure of the mountain where the villagers mined mercury. Yoshiki believes Nonuki is the same figure, with the original name only remembered because of the Indo family's sin. Yoshiki and Hikaru visit a shrine filled with wooden carvings of human faces, causing Hikaru to recall the original Hikaru's memories. He states that the carvings honor those whose heads were sacrificed, with the other body parts buried in specific areas around the village. He cannot remember the Indo family's sin, but Yoshiki knows who they can ask. In a post-credits scene, Hikaru considers devouring Yoshiki's soul and comes to his house at night; however, he resists the temptation and walks away, leaving Yoshiki bewildered.
11	"Indo's Sin"; Transliteration: "Indō no Tobira" (Japanese: 忌堂の扉)	Aimi Yamauchi	Oki Maruyama	Aimi Yamauchi	Akami, Yui Ushio, Yuka Hashimoto, Michiko Makita, Saori Yanaga, KAGO, Mizuka Takahashi, Reia Nihei, kiki, Mai Watanabe & Shanghai Phantom Animation	September 21, 2025
Yoshiki visits his estranged father, who explains the past Indo leader's sin: when his wife died, he took her head to the mountain god to revive her, promising to sacrifice others' heads, at which point one-third of the village was supernaturally killed, with their heads being removed. His wife died again the next night, and her head became the family's protective talisman, "Hichi-san". Hikaru's father begged the elders to end the ritual, and died in a mysterious accident soon afterwards. Yoshiki later discovers a depiction of Hikaru's innards in a painting from the 1500s titled "Gehenna". At school, Yoshiki opens up to Hikaru about the real Hikaru's personality. Soon after, Hikaru is suddenly drawn to Yoshiki's soul and begins transforming into Nonuki. He corners Yoshiki in the stairwell and they begin mixing, before Hikaru suddenly breaks out of the trance and flees. Unbeknownst to either, this is witnessed by Asako. Hikaru visits Rie and cries, believing he is too dangerous to live among the humans he loves. Rie considers exorcising Nonuki, but cannot bring herself to do so. After Hikaru leaves, a mysterious woman visits Rie. Hikaru decides that he is a monster who has no home in the human world, and returns to the Indo house, greeting his mother at the door.
12	"Its Place"; Transliteration: "Ibasho" (Japanese: 居場所)	Ryōhei Takeshita	Ryōhei Takeshita	Ryōhei Takeshita	Akira Okazaki & Mai Watanabe	September 28, 2025
Hikaru becomes avoidant and skips assembly, and is confronted by Asako in an empty classroom. She again accuses him of being possessed, and he admits that the real Hikaru is dead. Asako begins to cry, and Hikaru comforts her guiltily, envisioning the funeral Hikaru could have had and the closure his loved ones could have had if he had not intervened. Tanaka tells Takeda's son that Nonuki does not exist and the Indos' ritual is useless. Hikaru and Yoshiki decide to visit the beach that Yoshiki and the original Hikaru once visited. There, Yoshiki buys a float for his sister Kaoru, which he later loses in the sea. Hikaru tells Yoshiki he intends to return to the mountain, causing Yoshiki to panic. Hikaru declares that he loves Yoshiki, although neither romantically or platonically, and that he wants him to properly grieve; the pair fight as Yoshiki attempts to physically prevent him from leaving. Yoshiki expresses his belief that he is also a monster due to his feelings for the original Hikaru. The pair ultimately reconcile and decide that they do not have to be pretend to be normal. Later, as the pair watch the sunset, Tanaka approaches them and returns Kaoru's float.

=== Stage play ===
A stage play adaptation of the manga was announced September 19, 2025. It ran at Kinokuniya Hall in Tokyo from January 9 to 18, 2026, with Sōtarō Fujii directing and script writing the play while Mikihito Sano is composing the music.

== Reception ==
=== Manga ===
In the 2022 Next Manga Award, The Summer Hikaru Died ranked 11th in the web manga category. It was also the most popular choice among traditional Chinese voters. The series topped the 2023 edition of Takarajimasha's Kono Manga ga Sugoi! list of best manga for male readers. It was also nominated for the 16th Manga Taishō. The series ranked fifth in the Nationwide Bookstore Employees' Recommended Comics of 2023. It also ranked seventh in the seventh Tsutaya Comic Award. In 2023, the series was listed by the New York Public Library among its Best Books for Teens that year. It ranked 29th on the 2023 "Book of the Year" list by Da Vinci magazine. In 2024, the first volume and series author Mokumokuren were nominated for the Eisner Award for Best U.S. Edition of International Material—Asia and for Best Writer/Artist, respectively. The series was nominated for Harvey Awards in the Best Manga category in 2024 and 2025 and was listed by Yen Press as its top title for 2025. The series was also nominated at the Japan Society and Anime NYC's first American Manga Awards for Best Continuing Manga Series in 2024; it received a second nomination in 2025 and won on a third nomination in 2026.

The first volume received three times more orders than copies available in the first print run. The volume was reprinted six times in three months, having over 200,000 copies in circulation. By October 2022, the series had 550,000 copies in circulation. By June 2023, the series had 1.4 million copies in circulation. By December 2023, the series had 1.9 million copies in circulation. By May 24, 2024, the series had 2.1 million copies in circulation. By June 4, 2024, the series had 2.3 million copies in circulation. By November 4, 2024, the series had 3 million copies in circulation. By July 4, 2025, the series had 3.5 million copies in circulation. By September 26, 2025, the series had 4 million copies in circulation. By December 26, 2025, the series had 4.5 million copies in circulation. By June 1, 2026, the series had 5 million copies in circulation.

Mei Chan from Real Sound praised the story and characters as emotional. Chan also praised the artwork, believing it complemented the story well. Tensako Miura from An An praised the story, main characters, and artwork, positively noting the artwork's use of shades of black.

=== Anime ===
Year	Award	Category	Recipient	Result	Ref.
2025	31st Manga Barcelona Awards	Best Anime Series Premiere	The Summer Hikaru Died	Nominated	
2025	IGN Awards	Best Anime Series	The Summer Hikaru Died	Won	
2026	12th Anime Trending Awards	Best in Adapted Screenplay	Ryōhei Takeshita	Nominated	
2026	12th Anime Trending Awards	Best in Sceneries and Visuals	The Summer Hikaru Died	Nominated	
2026	12th Anime Trending Awards	Best in Soundtrack	Taro Umebayashi	Nominated	
2026	12th Anime Trending Awards	Opening Theme Song of the Year	"Saikai" by Vaundy	Nominated	
2026	12th Anime Trending Awards	Mystery or Psychological Anime of the Year	The Summer Hikaru Died	Nominated	
2026	12th Anime Trending Awards	Supernatural Anime of the Year	The Summer Hikaru Died	Nominated	
2026	12th Anime Trending Awards	Best Voice Acting Performance - Male	Chiaki Kobayashi as Yoshiki Tsujinaka	Nominated	
2026	10th Crunchyroll Anime Awards	Anime of the Year	The Summer Hikaru Died	Nominated	
2026	10th Crunchyroll Anime Awards	Best New Series	The Summer Hikaru Died	Nominated	
2026	10th Crunchyroll Anime Awards	Best Drama	The Summer Hikaru Died	Nominated	
2026	10th Crunchyroll Anime Awards	Best Background Art	The Summer Hikaru Died	Nominated	
2026	10th Crunchyroll Anime Awards	Best Director	Ryōhei Takeshita	Nominated	
2026	10th Crunchyroll Anime Awards	Best Voice Artist Performance (Japanese)	Chiaki Kobayashi as Yoshiki Tsujinaka	Nominated	
2026	10th Crunchyroll Anime Awards	Best Voice Artist Performance (English)	Paul Castro Jr. as Hikaru Indo	Nominated	
2026	10th Crunchyroll Anime Awards	Best Voice Artist Performance (French)	Jonathan Gimbord as Hikaru Indo	Nominated	
2026	Music Awards Japan	Best Original Score for Animation	Taro Umebayashi	Nominated	
2026	Japan Expo Awards	Daruma for Best Suspense Anime	The Summer Hikaru Died	Nominated	
2026	Japan Expo Awards	Daruma for Best Ending	"Anata wa Kaibutsu" by Tooboe	Nominated	
2026	21st AnimaniA Awards	Best TV Series: Online	The Summer Hikaru Died	Nominated	
2026	16th Newtype Anime Awards	Best Work (TV/Streaming)	The Summer Hikaru Died	10th place	
