= Yoshiki Nakajima =

Japanese voice actor

- 中島 ヨシキ
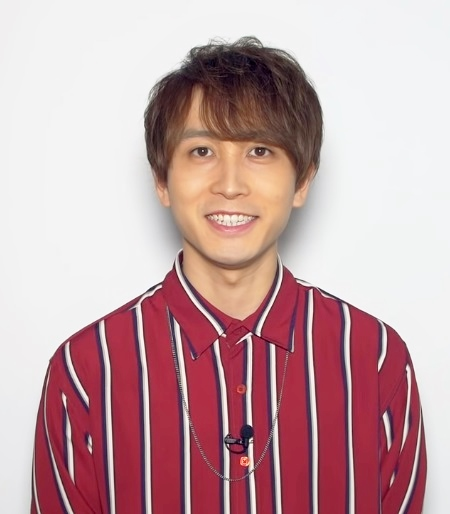
- Born: June 26, 1993 (age 33); Yokohama, Kanagawa, Japan
- Occupation: Voice actor
- Years active: 2012–present
- Agent: 81 Produce
- Height: 174 cm (5 ft 9 in)
- Musical career
- Genre: Pop rock
- Instruments: Vocals; guitar
- Label: TuneCore

Yoshiki Nakajima (中島 ヨシキ, Nakajima Yoshiki; born June 26, 1993) is a Japanese voice actor and singer affiliated with 81 Produce. He is known for his roles as Tetora Nagumo in Ensemble Stars!, Billy Wise in HELIOS Rising Heroes, Jiro Yamashita in The Idolmaster SideM and Yoshifumi Nitta in Hinamatsuri.

In addition to voice acting, Nakajima is also a member of UMake with fellow voice actor Kent Itō. He also provides vocals and guitar to the band Sir Vanity, a band he formed with Yuichiro Umehara and two other musicians.

== Biography ==
Nakajima was born in Yokohama, Kanagawa Prefecture, Japan, on June 26, 1993. He studied at the Voice Actor Department of Yoyogi Animation School in Yokohama. After graduating, he joined the vocal training school of agency 81 Produce. After the training period, in April 2012, he formally became affiliated with 81 Produce. In 2018, he performed the song "Sake to Ikura to 893 to Musume" (鮭とイクラと893と娘, transl. "Salted Salmon, Salmon Roe, 893, and the Girl"), which is used as the ending theme to the anime series Hinamatsuri, where he played the series' protagonist Yoshifumi Nitta. He also played the role of Makoto in the 2018 anime television series Ingress.

On July 22, 2021, Nakajima tested positive for COVID-19.

On March 22, 2026, Nakajima announced his engagement to his partner outside of the entertainment industry.

== Filmography ==
=== Television animation ===
List Of Voice Performances In Anime
Year	Title	Role
2012	B-Daman Fireblast	Takashi, Black clothes
2012	Sket Dance	Yankee, Male student, Servant, Boy
2012	Tamagotchi! Yume Kira Dream	Captain
2012	Chōsoku Henkei Gyrozetter	Inaba Takumi, Suzuki, Eraser A, Nimura
2012	Medaka Box	Orchestra members
2012	Beyblade: Shogun Steel	Blader, Follower E, Boy A
2012	Jormungand: Perfect Order	Member of SR
2013	Kill la Kill	Student C, Committee member B
2013	Gingitsune	Kamio Seigo
2013	Zettai Karen Children: The Unlimited – Hyoubu Kyousuke	Security guard
2013	Stella Women's Academy, High School Division Class C³	In-Car Announcement, Customer A, Game Machine
2013	Danchi Tomoo	Messenger Ari, Older brother, White Coat man, Soga no Iruka, Evil man's subordinate C
2013	Duel Masters Victory V3	Alexandrite, Fubō Tatsuki, Jorrmungard
2013	Tokyo Ravens	Man C
2013	Beast Saga	City man A, Coalem soldier, Child of Bixelow B, Agouru, Pyrazone A
2013	Pocket Monsters Best Wishes Season: 2 Decolora Adventure	Audience
2014	Mysterious Joker	Security guard, Ninja C, Minor B, Watcher 2
2014	Psycho-Pass 2	Hostage, Operator, Youth, Controller
2014	Terror in Resonance	Criminal, Announcer
2014	SoniAni: Super Sonico The Animation	Shopkeeper C in the shopping district, Young people
2014	Dragon Collection	Cup, Revive Roger, Headbusher, Dante, Flagels
2014	Hamatora	Hasegawa (ep 11)
2014	PriPara	Manager (ep 3), Announcer (ep 13, 14), SP (ep 63), Photographer (ep 74)
2015	Kamisama Minarai: Himitsu no Cocotama	Satou (ep 9)
2015	Rin-ne	Salesman, Boy D
2015	Classroom Crisis	Yuji's subordinate C
2015	Saekano: How to Raise a Boring Girlfriend	Man
2015	Tantei Team KZ Jiken Note	Tachibana Yuki
2015	Pokémon XY Special Episode: The Strongest Mega Evolution ~ Act III ~	Operator B
2016	Endride	General Headquarters Guard, Beopetle, Joseph
2016	KonoSuba	Quest message A, Town-man C, Adventurer, Man
2016	Nurse Witch Komugi-chan R	Moderator, Chair A
2016	Magi: Adventure of Sinbad	Soldier B
2017	Sengoku Night Blood	Yamagata Masakage
2017	The Idolmaster SideM	Jiro Yamashita
2017	Dynamic Chord	Yuki Aoi
2018	Sweet Punishment	Yamato Higa
2018	Hinamatsuri	Yoshifumi Nitta
2018	Bakumatsu	Seimei
2018	Ingress	Makoto
2019	My Roommate Is a Cat	Yūgo Ōkami
2019	Bakumatsu Crisis	Seimei
2019	Fairy Gone	Serge Tovah
2019	Ensemble Stars!	Tetora Nagumo
2019	Try Knights	Seiichirō Nade
2019	Stand My Heroes: PIECE OF TRUTH	Koya Kirishima
2020	Plunderer	Licht Bach/Rihito Sakai
2020	Minegishi-san wa Ōtsu-kun ni Tabesasetai	Ōtsu-kun
2021	Dr. Stone: Stone Wars	Yō Uei
2021	Remake Our Life!	Shō Kakihara
2022	Aoashi	Shun Aoi
2022	Orient	Masayuki Amakasu
2023	UniteUp!	Maoto Tsujido
2023	Malevolent Spirits: Mononogatari	Suzuri
2023	Opus Colors	Kaede Mikuriya
2024	Unnamed Memory	Oscar
2024	Egumi Legacy	Mohican Dot
2024	Tasūketsu: Fate of the Majority	Yōhei Fukami
2024	The Most Notorious "Talker" Runs the World's Greatest Clan	Loyd
2025	I Left My A-Rank Party to Help My Former Students Reach the Dungeon Depths!	Simon
2025	Blue Miburo	Sendō
2025	Secrets of the Silent Witch	Cyril Ashley
2025	Watari-kun's ****** Is About to Collapse	Shigenobu Tokui
2025	The Summer Hikaru Died	Yūta Maki
2025	Night of the Living Cat	Masaki
2026	Jack-of-All-Trades, Party of None	Oliver Kadiff
2026	Kusunoki's Garden of Gods	Fūjin
2026	Kill Blue	Eiji Rindō
2027	Bless	Joe Osaki

=== Theatrical animation ===
Year	Title	Role
2019	Even if the World Will End Tomorrow	Jin
2019	KonoSuba: God's Blessing on this Wonderful World! Legend of Crimson	Bukkororii
2020	WAVE!! Surfing Yappe!!	Nalu Tanaka

=== Tokusatsu ===
List Of Voice Performances In Tokusatsu
Year	Title	Role
2019	Lupinranger VS Patranger VS Kyuranger	Rirus Lippig

=== Video games ===
2012

- E.X. Troopers – Academia

2015

- White Cat Project – Zack
- The Idolmaster SideM – Jiro Yamashita
- Ensemble Stars! – Tetora Nagumo

2016

- Soul Reverse Zero – Oda Nobunaga, Theseus
- Dynamic Chord – Yuki Aoi
- Dragon Quest: Monster Battle Scanner – Mikeman Yoshiki
- Magical Days the Brats Parade – Jin

2019

- BlackStar – Theatre Starless – Rindou
- Hero's Park – Mashiba Tomoki

2020

- Dragalia Lost – Joachim
- HELIOS Rising Heroes – Billy Wise

2024

- 18trip – Ten Murakumo
- Tokyo Debunkers – Rui Mizuki

=== Multimedia projects ===
- Paradox Live – Shogo Yamato
- Fabulous Night – RYO-YA
- from ARGONAVIS – Futa Kaminoshima

=== Dubbing ===
- All of Us Are Dead, Lee Su-hyeok (Park Solomon)
- Revenge of Others, Ji Soo-heon (Park Solomon)
- ZeroZeroZero, Stefano La Piana (Giuseppe De Domenico)
