= JM (manga) =

Japanese manga series

- First tankōbon volume cover

ジェイエム (Jeiemu)
- Genre: Action, comedy
- Manga
- Written by: Masao Ohtake
- Published by: Enterbrain
- English publisher: NA: Kadokawa
- Imprint: Harta Comix
- Magazine: Harta Alternative
- Original run: May 8, 2023 – present
- Volumes: 8
- Anime television series

JM (stylized as J⇔M (Japanese: ジェイエム, Hepburn: Jeiemu)) is a Japanese manga series written and illustrated by Masao Ohtake. It began serialization on Enterbrain's Harta Alternative web service in May 2023, and has been compiled into eight volumes as of August 2026. An anime television series adaptation has been announced.

== Plot ==
J, a skilled assassin infamous in the underworld for being "untouchable", encounters a young girl named Megumi Akahoshi. During the encounter, he accidentally falls down the stairs, ending up switching bodies with her. With the two having contrasting personalities and having to live each other's life, J, using Megumi's body, ends up acting like a feared assassin, leading to the rise of a new feared killer.

== Characters ==
J
An assassin who became infamous after wiping out several yakuza clans, despite various attempts at his life. Rumors swirl that he had been orphaned and a young age and was adopted by a gang to do their bidding, but eventually became so skilled that many wanted to take him out. After he switches bodies with Megumi, he keeps the same personality while in Megumi's body, now acting tough but also lacking Megumi's intelligence, as well as continuing his killing activities. He continues to go to school as Megumi, but due to his lack of intelligence, the new Megumi is no longer an academic prodigy, much to the shock and concern of her classmates and teacher.
Megumi Akahoshi (赤星 恵, Akahoshi Megumi)
A half-Japanese girl who ran away from home. She is not on good terms with her overbearing mother, who has high expectations of her and keeps pushing her to study. She is intelligent, but is often bullied in school for being half-Japanese. Her father is absent from her life. Finding herself in J's body, she makes changes, such as ordering girly decorations for his office.

== Media ==
=== Manga ===
The series is written and illustrated by Masao Ohtake, who previously worked on the manga series Hinamatsuri in Enterbrain's Harta magazine. It began serialization on Enterbrain's Harta Alternative web service on May 8, 2023. The first tankōbon volume was released on October 14, 2023; eight volumes have been published as of August 12, 2026. The series is published digitally in English by Kadokawa on its BookWalker website.

No.	Release date	ISBN
1	October 14, 2023	978-4-04-737652-6
2	February 15, 2024	978-4-04-737653-3
3	July 12, 2024	978-4-04-737940-4
4	December 13, 2024	978-4-04-738100-1
5	May 15, 2025	978-4-04-738376-0
6	October 15, 2025	978-4-04-738559-7
7	March 13, 2026	978-4-04-738573-3
8	August 12, 2026	978-4-04-500120-8

=== Anime ===
An anime television series adaptation was announced on March 10, 2026.

== See also ==
- Hinamatsuri, another manga series by the same author
- Joshikōsei Joreishi Akane!, another manga series by the same author
