= List of Billboard Japan Hot Albums number ones of 2026 =

The following is a list of weekly number-one albums on the Billboard Japan Hot Albums chart in 2026.

== Chart history ==
Number-one albums of 2026 on the Billboard Japan Hot Albums
Issue date	Album	Artist(s)	Ref.
January 7	Starring	King & Prince	
January 14	Starring	King & Prince	
January 21	My Respect	Nogizaka46	
January 28	Milesixtones: Best Tracks	SixTones	
February 4	The Core	XG	
February 11	Play	MiSaMo	
February 18	Kawaii Lab. Best Album	Team Kawaii Lab	
February 25	Idol1st	Kento Nakajima	
March 4	Hana	Hana	
March 11	Hana	Hana	
March 18	Hana	Hana	
March 25	Arirang	BTS	
April 1	Arirang	BTS	
April 8	Arirang	BTS	
April 15	Arirang	BTS	
April 22	Arirang	BTS	
April 29	We on Fire	&Team	
May 6	Momentum	Timelesz	
May 13	Arirang	BTS	
May 20	Arirang	BTS	
May 27	Arirang	BTS	
June 3	Arirang	BTS	
June 10	New Wav	Treasure	
June 17	Home	BoyNextDoor	
June 24	ND5	Naniwa Danshi	
July 1	Hitotarashi	Keisuke Kuwata	
July 8	Portfolio	NiziU	
July 15	Arirang	BTS	
July 22	Arirang	BTS	
July 29	On-Deck!	Mechatu-a	
August 5	KMK	NEWS	
August 12	Damdarah	Super Eight	
August 19	Chiikawa the Movie: The Secret of the Mermaid Island Original Soundtrack	Various artists	
August 26	KaikiLove	Zerobaseone	
September 2	The Sin: Bliss	Enhypen	
September 9	So Honey EP	King & Prince	
September 16	Supernova	Masaharu Fukuyama	
September 23	Love Engine	M!lk	
September 30	Mark on Me	&Team	
October 7	Pops	Mrs. Green Apple	
October 14	Amenity	Snow Man	
October 21	Pops	Mrs. Green Apple	
October 28	Pops	Mrs. Green Apple	
November 4	Kis Scene	Kis-My-Ft2	
November 11	Pops	Mrs. Green Apple	
November 18	Juliet	Hey! Say! JUMP	

== See also ==
- List of Hot 100 number-one singles of 2026 (Japan)
