= High School Exorcist Akane! =

Japanese manga series

- First tankōbon volume cover

女子高生除霊師アカネ! (Joshikōsei Joreishi Akane!)
- Genre: Comedy
- Manga
- Written by: Masao Ohtake
- Published by: Shueisha
- English publisher: Shueisha (digital)
- Imprint: Young Jump Comics
- Magazine: Grand Jump (2022–23); Grand Jump Mucha (2023–present)
- Original run: March 16, 2022 – present
- Volumes: 4
- icon

High School Exorcist Akane! (女子高生除霊師アカネ!, Joshikōsei Joreishi Akane!) is a Japanese manga series written and illustrated by Masao Ohtake. It was published in Shueisha's seinen manga magazine Grand Jump from March 2022 to February 2023 before transferring to Grand Jump Mucha in November of that same year.

== Publication ==
Written and illustrated by Masao Ohtake, High School Exorcist Akane! was first published as a one-shot in Shueisha's seinen manga magazine Grand Jump on March 16, 2022, and began serialization in the same magazine on August 17 of that same year. Its last chapter in the magazine was released on February 15, 2023, and the series was transferred to Grand Jump Mucha on October 24 of that same year. Shueisha has collected its chapters into individual tankōbon volumes, with the first one released on April 18, 2023. As of April 17, 2026, four volumes have been released. Shueisha began publishing the manga in English on its Manga Million digital platform in 2026.

=== Volumes ===
| No. | Release date | ISBN |
|---|---|---|
| 1 | April 18, 2023 | 978-4-08-892678-0 |
| 2 | June 19, 2024 | 978-4-08-893283-5 |
| 3 | April 17, 2025 | 978-4-08-893657-4 |
| 4 | April 17, 2026 | 978-4-08-894173-8 |

== See also ==
- Hinamatsuri, another manga series by the same author
- JM, another manga series by the same author
