= Paul Castro Jr. =

American voice actor

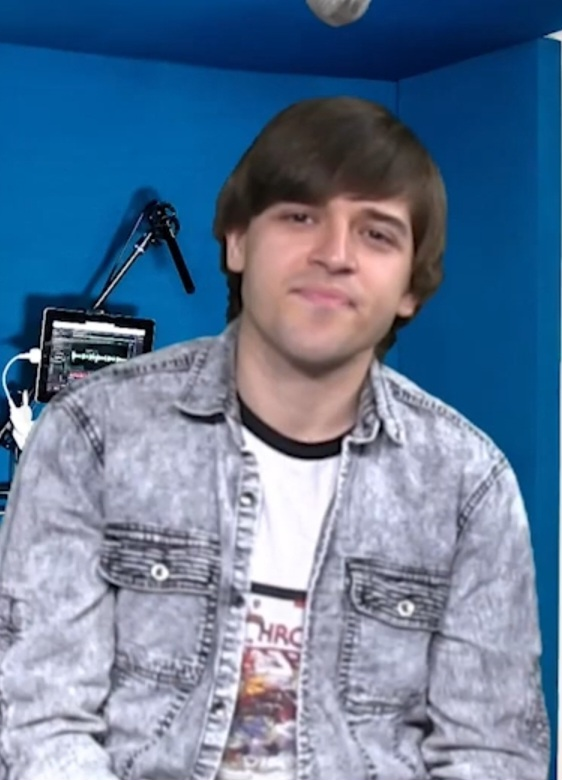
- Castro in 2020
- Education: Monmouth University; New York University
- Occupation: Voice actor
- Years active: 2020–present
- Notable credits: Rindo in Neo: The World Ends with You; Ryota Miyagi in The First Slam Dunk; Hikaru in The Summer Hikaru Died
- Partner: Aly Miller
- Website: www.paulcastrojr.com

Paul Castro Jr. is an American voice actor, known for his work on video games and English dubs of anime.

== Early life and career ==
Initially attending college at Monmouth University, Castro tried a variety of majors before ending up in an intro to acting class. Without any other background or experience in acting, he took a chance and applied to transfer to New York University and went on to study 3 years at the New York University Tisch School of the Arts Meisner Studio. After graduating, he spent several years working in New York City. Castro moved to Los Angeles, California in 2020 to pursue an acting career. He was inspired by his love of being part of the creative process, in addition to voice over, anime, video games.

Castro was cast in his first lead role as Rindo Kanade in Neo: The World Ends with You, as an unknown actor. Having grown up playing The World Ends with You and watching Dragon Ball Z, Castro said he cried upon being cast as Rindo and experienced imposter syndrome when cast as mini Vegeta in Dragon Ball Daima.

== Accolades and personal life ==
Castro produced, directed, wrote and starred in the short film Aeris with his partner, Aly Miller. At the 2018 Garden State Film Festival, Aeris won Best Narrative Short Film. Alongside Miller, Castro also produced the documentary Madonna and the Breakfast Club.

At the 10th Crunchyroll Anime Awards in 2026, Castro was nominated in the category of Best Voice Artist Performance (English) for his work as Hikaru in The Summer Hikaru Died.

== Filmography ==
=== Animated series ===
List of voice performances in animated series
Year	Title	Role	Notes	Ref.
2020, 2026	Johnny Test: The Lost Web Series	Johnny Test	15 episodes	
2021	High-Rise Invasion	Rikuya Yoshida		
2021	Record of Ragnarok	Forseti, Abel		
2022	Vampire in the Garden	Allegro		
2023	Pokémon: Paldean Winds	Aliquis		
2024	The Seven Deadly Sins: Four Knights of the Apocalypse	Chion		
2024	Go! Go! Loser Ranger!	Hibiki Sakurama		
2024	Invincible Fight Girl	Craig, Marv Beefpuncha		
2024	That Time I Got Reincarnated as a Slime	Gobuemon	Ep. 63	
2024	Beyblade X	Packun		
2025	Medalist	Kakeru Uobuchi		
2025	Dragon Ball Daima	Vegeta (mini)		
2025	Mobile Suit Gundam GQuuuuuuX	Shuji Ito		
2025	Yu-Gi-Oh! Go Rush	Yuhi Ohdo		
2025	Übel Blatt	Walge		
2025	Disney Twisted-Wonderland	Riddle Rosehearts		
2025	The Summer Hikaru Died	Hikaru		
2025	Digimon Beatbreak	Monodramon, Rhamphomon, Azhdarmon, Ketomon, Kaito Kutsuna		
2025	Your Forma	Nikolai	Eps. 10-12	
2026	Fate/Strange Fake	Sigma		
2026	Mission: Yozakura Family	Sosuke Michibata		
2026	Sparks of Tomorrow	Yosuke Mizoe		
2026	Mao	Shiraha		
2026	The Seven Knights of the Marronnier Kingdom	Fraternity		
2026	Tougen Anki: Nikko Kegon Falls Arc	Misaki Kakoi		

=== Film ===
List of voice performances in film
Year	Title	Role	Notes	Ref.
2022	Belle	Kei/Dragon		
2022	Mobile Suit Gundam: Cucuruz Doan's Island	Marcos		
2023	The First Slam Dunk	Ryota Miyagi		

=== Video games ===
List of voice performances in video games
Year	Title	Role	Notes	Ref.
2020	Dragon Ball Z: Kakarot	Vegeta (mini)		
2021	Cookie Run: Kingdom	Carameleon Cookie		
2021	Neo: The World Ends with You	Rindo Kanade		
2021	The Addams Family: Mansion Mayhem	Pugsley Addams		
2023	Fire Emblem Heroes	Febail, Tormod		
2023	Genshin Impact	Freminet		
2024	Persona 3 Reload	Nozomi Suemitsu		
2024	Lunar: Silver Star Story Complete	Ramus Pharmain, Nash Rumack		
2024	Yu-Gi-Oh! Duel Links	Yuhi Ohdo		
2024	Final Fantasy VII Rebirth	Billy		
2024	Visions of Mana	Eoren		
2024	Dragon Ball: Sparking! Zero	Vegeta (mini)		
2024	Farmagia	Ten		
2025	The Legend of Heroes: Trails Through Daybreak II	Ixs Eldarion		
2025	Rune Factory: Guardians of Azuma	Mauro		
2025	Mario Kart World	Spectator Toads		
2025	Death Stranding 2: On the Beach	Heartman's AED		
2025	Daemon X Machina: Titanic Scion	Ash		
2026	The Legend of Heroes: Trails Beyond the Horizon	Ixs Eldarion		
2027	Persona 4 Revival	Yosuke Hanamura	Pending release	

=== Live action dubbing ===
List of voice performances in live action dubbing
Year	Title	Role	Notes	Ref.
2024	Ultraman Arc	Yuma Hize		
