= Hinamatsuri (manga) =

Japanese manga series

- First tankōbon volume cover, featuring Hina Nitta (right) and Yoshifumi Nitta (left)

ヒナまつり
- Genre: Comedy; Slice of life; Supernatural
- Manga
- Written by: Masao Ohtake
- Published by: Enterbrain
- English publisher: NA: One Peace Books
- Magazine: Harta
- Original run: June 15, 2010 – July 15, 2020
- Volumes: 19
- Anime television series
- Directed by: Kei Oikawa
- Produced by: Mitsuhiro Ogata; Noritomo Isogai; Shintarō Yoshitake; Kazufumi Kikushima; Hiroyasu Taniguchi; Toyokazu Nakahigashi
- Written by: Keiichirō Ōchi
- Music by: Yasuhiro Misawa
- Studio: Feel
- Licensed by: Crunchyroll
- Original network: AT-X, Tokyo MX, KBS Kyoto, TVA, Sun TV, TVQ, BS11
- Original run: April 6, 2018 – June 22, 2018
- Episodes: 12
- icon

Hinamatsuri (Japanese: ヒナまつり) (Note: The title means "Hina Festival", referring to the heroine. Hinamatsuri is also the name of the Japanese Dolls' Festival.) is a Japanese manga series written and illustrated by Masao Ohtake. It was serialized in Enterbrain's magazine Harta, formerly known as Fellows!, from June 2010 to July 2020. Its chapters were collected in 19 tankōbon volumes. The series is licensed by One Peace Books. An anime television series adaptation produced by Feel aired from April to June 2018. The story follows yakuza member Yoshifumi Nitta, who ends up taking care of a mysterious girl with telekinetic powers named Hina who inexplicably appeared in his apartment.

== Plot ==
Yoshifumi Nitta, a mid-level Yakuza of the Ashikawa-gumi, finds his normal life thrown into chaos when a girl from the future literally drops on his head without warning. Knowing nothing more than her name, Hina, and the fact that she has incredible psychokinetic powers, Yoshifumi reluctantly becomes her de facto father. However, Hina's arrival sets off a chain reaction of events that affects everyone in the city, especially after more girls from the future arrive to bring her back or terminate her.

== Characters ==
=== Main characters ===
Hina Nitta (新田 ヒナ, Nitta Hina)
Voiced by: Takako Tanaka (Japanese); Brina Palencia (English)
Hina is the titular heroine, possessing superhuman abilities such as telekinesis. Originally hailing from the future, she went back in time in a pod and landed on Nitta's head. Due to Hina threatening to break his furniture, Nitta reluctantly lets her stay. As he takes care of her, Nitta begins to feel more and more like a parent. Over the course of the plot, Nitta and Hina's relationship grow to the extent that they consider each other to be father and daughter - Nitta would welcome her into the Nitta family as his daughter, in front of his mother and sister.
Nitta enrols Hina in school at her request, but she does not usually take it seriously, often sleeping in class. At home, she usually lazes around and plays video games. She is very particular about food, despite demonstrably lacking a refined palate; her favourite food is salmon roe. Although Nitta cares for her, Hina can annoy him to the extent that she gets kicked out of the apartment (temporarily). Nitta often compares her to the diligent Anzu, a fellow esper, and imagines being her father instead.
Yoshifumi Nitta (新田 義史, Nitta Yoshifumi)
Voiced by: Yoshiki Nakajima (Japanese); Jarrod Greene (English)
Yoshifumi Nitta, mostly referred to by his surname Nitta, is the series protagonist. He is a member of the Ashikawa-gumi yakuza, later to become its lieutenant (kashira). One day, a portal opens from the future and drops Hina in a pod on his head; she threatens to break his furniture if he doesn't let her stay.
Nitta acquired cooking and housekeeping skills to take care of his mother and younger sister after his father died, and his hobby is collecting rare porcelain vases and urns (which Hina often destroys). Initially, Nitta presents Hina to his family as Hina Adachi, the daughter of an imprisoned fellow yakuza he is fostering. However, he decides to acknowledge her as his daughter after realising just how much their relationship has grown.

=== Supporting characters ===
Anzu (アンズ) / Anzu Hayashi (林 あんず, Hayashi Anzu)
Voiced by: Rie Murakawa (Japanese); Amanda Lee (English)
Anzu is another superhuman with telekinetic powers like Hina. She is initially sent to kill Hina, but loses to her in a contest of strength and abandons the mission. Unable to return to the future because the device necessary to do so was inadvertently damaged, she is taken in by Yassan, a homeless man. He invites her to join a homeless camp in Tokyo, where she learns the value of hard work and money.
When the camp is evicted from the park where they were staying, Anzu is adopted by a couple who run a Chinese restaurant, the Hayashis. She starts to adapt to a normal childhood; though retaining her values from her time with the camp. Anzu's conscientious and dutiful nature (a far cry from who she was when she first arrived in the present) often makes Nitta wish she were his daughter, instead of Hina.
Eventually, Anzu's parents decide to close down their restaurant, prompting Anzu to start up her own mobile ramen stand, which Nitta and Sabu frequent. When Hitomi visits the stall with her employees, one of them recognises her as his adopted younger sister. Later on in the series, Anzu bans Nitta from visiting the stall after a misunderstanding involving Sabu, although she later unbans him after Sabu apologizes.
Hitomi Mishima (三嶋 瞳, Mishima Hitomi)
Voiced by: Kaede Hondo (Japanese); Tabitha Ray (English)
Hitomi is Hina's classmate in middle school, who has trouble saying no to helping people. When Hina asks her to tag along whilst she investigates what Nitta is getting up to, she's left all alone at Little Song. Mistaken for a bartender, Hitomi proves superb at tending bar, leading Utako to blackmail her into working at Little Song. Through a series of coincidences, she is taken for an adult, and starts working at more and more jobs whilst trying (and failing) to be a normal student. She also accumulates connections to influential businesspeople, politicians, and yakuza. Hitomi climbs the ranks so fast at one company, that she ends up President - hiring her father under her adult guise when he is laid off from his job. Later on, she resigns from her job to escape the corporate world and moves to Florida, but somehow ends up CEO at an even bigger company.
Hitomi, at least in the beginning, is a milquetoast; generally bending over backwards for anything that is asked of her. However, as the series progresses and she acquires influence, Hitomi becomes more willing and able to use her connections against those who earn her scorn. When the cast learns about the bad future they need to avert, for example, Nitta is shown not caring at all - not even when Hitomi returns to Japan specifically to seek his aid in regards to that. As a result, she manipulates things so that all of Nitta's businesses go under, and, as a final nail in the coffin, nearly alienates Anzu from him, causing him to give in and start calling her "my liege".
Utako Sakura (桜 詩子, Sakura Utako)
Voiced by: Yōko Hikasa (Japanese); Mallorie Rodak (English)
The owner and original bartender of the bar Little Song. She blackmails Hitomi into working for her after Hitomi becomes highly skilled at bartending, but is soon made redundant in her own bar as her customers come to prefer Hitomi's drinks. Nitta was romantically interested in Utako, but she rejects him because she believes him to be a divorced single father, and Nitta later loses interest in her due to her self-centred personality. Despite this, she is shown to have another side to her; protesting on behalf of and serving soup to the ward's homeless on the verge of eviction, and arranging for Anzu to be taken in by the Hayashis.
Mao (マオ)
Voiced by: Ari Ozawa (Japanese); Ariel Graham (English)
Another esper with telekinetic powers from the same organization as Hina and Anzu. After being sent to recover them both, she accidentally lands on a deserted island and is stuck there for months without human contact, creating wooden puppet versions of Hina and Anzu to keep from going insane. Eventually, she manages to build a raft and ends up in China, where she studies kung-fu while subtly using her powers to rise near the top of the school. After a few years of training, she returns to Japan after being tasked to establish a branch of the school there, which leads to the establishment of a fitness instruction class called "Superhuman Fitness".
Yoshihiko Ashikawa (芦川 良彦, Ashikawa Yoshihiko)
Voiced by: Hidekatsu Shibata (Japanese); Bill Jenkins (English)
The former head of Ashikawa-gumi. He eventually retires from his position due his advanced age and poor health, but maintains much of his influence. He dotes on Hina in a grandfatherly way, even using yakuza resources to assist her in such situations as running for student council president, and encourages Nitta to take a more active interest in raising her.
Kiyoshi Baba (馬場 清, Baba Kiyoshi)
Voiced by: Tsuyoshi Koyama (Japanese); Tyler Walker (English)
The second-in-command of Nitta's yakuza group. He views Nitta as a shameless brown-noser, but respects his recent accomplishments. He succeeded Yoshishiko as the new head of the yakuza group.
Sabu (サブ)
Voiced by: Kengo Kawanishi (Japanese); Kyle Phillips (English)
Nitta's underling in his yakuza group. He usually proves somewhat inept at whatever task he is assigned, such as debt collection, forcing Nitta to handle matters personally.
Tatsuhiko Naitou (内藤達彦, Naitō Tatsuhiko)
Voiced by: Tetsu Inada (Japanese); Christopher Sabat (English)
Nitta's former mentor and the estranged father of Hitoshi. Known to be quick-tempered, demanding, and violent, he gave Nitta the scar above his eye. He spent several years in prison and is released in the months after Nitta starts taking care of Hina.
Hitoshi Maeda (前田 仁志, Maeda Hitoshi)
A boy who attends the same middle school as Hina, and later on develop feelings for her. Hina helps him work up the courage to confront his absentee father, Naitou.
Mami Shinjou (新庄 マミ, Shinjō Mami)
Voiced by: Eri Suzuki (Japanese); Lindsay Seidel (English)
One of Hina's classmates, and one of the few people who becomes aware of Hina's powers. She is obsessed with the paranormal and as such tends to gravitate towards Hina and also tends to jump to weird conclusions and overall acts like a younger kid than she is. She is also a loner in high school.
Sayo Aizawa (相沢 さよ, Aizawa Sayo)
Voiced by: Mikako Komatsu (Japanese); Jennifer Alyx (English)
One of Hina's classmates. She helps in the investigation to discover Hitomi's secret job. She tends to be very serious, although she also plays around for fun. She is also noticeably smarter than her classmates, and her defining trait is her glasses.
Yassan (ヤッさん)
Voiced by: Shinpachi Tsuji (Japanese); R Bruce Elliott (English)
Yassan is the homeless man who takes Anzu in after she fails to return to her home time. He teaches her the value of hard work and money, and becomes a father figure to her. After the ward administration evicted them from the park they were staying in, he brokered a deal through Utako for the Hayashis to take her in as their daughter. Yassan meets Anzu again after the time-skip, getting a bowl of ramen from her cart.
Atsushi Yamamoto (山本 アツシ, Yamamoto Atsushi)
Voiced by: Taku Yashiro (Japanese); Justin Cook (English)
The lead guitarist and vocalist of the band Central Park. Initially struggling to gain popularity, the band gains after coming into contact with Hina, who uses her powers to allow Atsushi to float during performances, a feeling he terms "Rocksion". After Hina ceases working with the band, their popularity falls again, leading Atsushi on a quest to gain magic powers and obtain "Rocksion". He later starts collaborating with Mao in the Superhuman Fitness project. In the previous timeline, his starts the project that led to the creation of the superhumans and is referred to as "Master", but is detained after the superhumans go out of control.

== Media ==
=== Manga ===
Hinamatsuri is written and illustrated by Masao Ohtake. It was serialized in Enterbrain's magazine Harta (formerly known as Fellows!), from June 15, 2010, to July 15, 2020. Its chapters were collected in nineteen tankōbon volumes.

English manga publisher One Peace Books has licensed the series for publication in North America.

=== Anime ===
A 12-episode anime television series adaptation by Feel aired from April 6 to June 22, 2018. The series is directed by Kei Oikawa with Keiichirō Ōchi writing the scripts and Nippon Columbia producing the music. Rie Murakawa performed the opening theme song "Distance", while Yoshiki Nakajima performed the ending theme "Sake to Ikura to 893 to Musume" (鮭とイクラと893と娘, transl. "Salted Salmon, Salmon Roe, 893, and the Girl") as his character Yoshifumi Nitta. The second ending theme titled "Shashin Jō" (写真帖, transl. "Photo Book") by Yoko Ishida is used in episode 6, while episode 12 uses two ending themes: "Taisetsu na Hito" (たいせつなひと, transl. "Someone Important") by Haruka Chisuga and "Hajimete no Kimochi" (初めてのキモチ, transl. "First Time Feeling") by Ari Ozawa as her character Mao, respectively. Crunchyroll simulcast the series, while Funimation streamed an English dub.

==== Episodes ====
No.	Title (Note: All English titles are taken from Crunchyroll.)	Original release date
1	"Arrival of the Psychokinetic Girl!"; Transliteration: "Chō-nōryoku Shōjo Arawaru!" (Japanese: 超能力少女現る！)	April 6, 2018
A mid-level Yakuza, Yoshifumi Nitta, relaxes at home when a large metal pod drops onto his head out of nowhere. After hitting a switch on the back, a naked girl emerges from the pod. Remembering nothing else except her name, Hina, she uses psychokinesis to threaten Nitta into buying her clothes and toys. Nitta soon realizes that he's become her de facto guardian. When Hina asks to enter school, Nitta offers to enter her in a nearby school if she stops using her powers. After an awkward introduction, Hina settles in to her new school. However, her power builds up too much and ends up exploding inside Nitta's apartment. Later, Nitta makes use of her powers to clear off a plot of land for his company. After the job is over, Nitta is called in by his Yakuza boss to take revenge on a rival group. He accidentally convinces Hina to do the job for him, as she uses her powers to wipe out the entire enemy office by herself.
2	"This is How You Have a Superpower Battle!"; Transliteration: "Chō-nōryoku Shōbu wa kō yanda yo!" (Japanese: 超能力勝負はこうやんだよ！)	April 13, 2018
A blonde girl emerges from a similar pod as Hina, single-handedly taking down a street gang and stealing their leader's clothes. Nitta accidentally runs into her at a ramen shop and finds out that she has the same powers as Hina. With help from local homeless contacts, Nitta tracks down the girl, Anzu, and uses Hina to subdue her without further damage. Hina offers to hang out with Anzu one last time before she returns to the future, and the two stay over at Nitta's apartment. After saying goodbye, Anzu finds she can't return to her original time. Later, Nitta finds out that his favorite women have stopped asking him out as word has gotten around that he has a daughter (Hina). Annoyed at this shift, he starts going out more while leaving Hina with a can of mackerel for dinner. Hina, growing suspicious, asks her classmate Hitomi for help tracking him down, but keeps getting distracted. Hina ends up asking Utako for advice while Hitomi is accidentally pressed into service as a bartender by a drunken man. Utako and Hina return to the bar to find Hitomi serving drinks for multiple customers, including Nitta. The group then heads together to a nearby cabaret club and parties hard. The next morning, Nitta awakens to find a large invoice from the club.
3	"Hobo Life 101"; Transliteration: "Hōmuresu Seikatsu Nyūmon-hen" (Japanese: ホームレス生活入門編)	April 20, 2018
Anzu finds herself hunted down by local shopkeepers for her shoplifting of food. A homeless man helps her escape her pursuers and teaches her how to live honestly at a local homeless encampment. Nitta stumbles across Anzu picking up cans for change, and offers her 40,000 Yen. She rejects it at first, but then accepts, hoping to help out her fellow homeless. However, Utako and the local shopkeepers catch her, and take most of the money for the stolen goods. At night, Hitomi secretly works as a bartender after being blackmailed by Utako. However, the bar's patrons have taken a liking to her drinks, including Hitomi's homeroom teacher and vice principal. Meanwhile, Nitta remarks that he'd love to have Anzu and Hina switch places sometime. The next day, Hina tries to clean the apartment to avoid her nightmare scenario, but her carelessness makes things worse.
4	"Disownment Rock n' Roll Fever"; Transliteration: "Kandō Rokkun Rōru Fībā" (Japanese: 勘当ロックンロールフィーバー)	April 27, 2018
Upon finding his apartment trashed, Nitta disowns Hina and kicks her out. Hina blows through all her money and ends up spending the night with Anzu at her shack, but soon exhausts her patience as well until Anzu kicks her out three days later. Meanwhile, Utako and the rest of her regulars at the bar kick Nitta out for supposedly abandoning his daughter. Alone and lost, Hina is inspired by a local indie rock band to use her powers for street magic, and also helps the band explode in popularity. However, she decides to take her earnings with the group and leaves to buy Nitta a new vase as a peace offering. Later, Hitomi ends another day of bartending when she helps Anzu take in empty cans, and is introduced to her homeless lifestyle in return. Hitomi tries to keep up with the upbeat Anzu, but falls asleep standing up.
5	"Three Heads Are Better Than One"; Transliteration: "San-nin Atsumareba Monju no Chie o Uchiyabure" (Japanese: 三人集まれば文殊の知恵を打ち破れ)	May 4, 2018
Anzu tries to find old TVs to sell to another homeless man. After striking out on a cart full of old CRT TVs, Anzu gets a reluctant Hina and Hitomi to help her. Hitomi gets caught by a policeman, while Hina asks Nitta for money to buy one. Eventually, the two manage to sell a TV each, with Anzu revealing that she wanted the money to buy a video game to play with Hina. Later, Hitomi's classmates spot Hitomi and then her homeroom teacher heading into a local bar. After gathering Hina and another friend of Hitomi, the kids try to find out the truth. After failed attempts to interrogate her at school, the group tails her to the bar and Aizawa gets her to confess to being a bartender in increasingly higher tones.
6	"Nitta-san Has a Dandy Dad"; Transliteration: "Nitta-san no Chichioya wa Dandi" (Japanese: 新田さんの父親はダンディ)	May 11, 2018
Nitta gets called back home by his mother and sister to pay respects to his late father. However, after Hina answers the phone, Nitta comes up with an increasingly complex lie to explain her presence. While drinking with his family, Nitta lets slip the time he kicked Hina out of his home, and decides to admit that Hina is his daughter. Meanwhile, the homeless encampment is about to be demolished by the local government. Anzu tries to rally her fellow homeless, but none of them wish to fight a losing battle. Instead, they tearfully leave her with Utako, who then leaves her to the Hayashi family, who owns Chinese restaurant "Rairaiken." Remembering her old friends and their lessons, Anzu decides to work at Rairaiken with her new family.
7	"Anzu Is a Greeter Now"; Transliteration: "Kanban Musume Anzu hajimemashita" (Japanese: 看板娘アンズ始めました)	May 18, 2018
Anzu adjusts to the culture shock of her new home and work at the restaurant, as she keeps falling back on her habits within the homeless camp. Later, Hina is tired of getting yelled at by the teachers for sleeping in class. After talking with Nitta, Hina decides to run for Student Council President with her only goals of being allowed to sleep and eat more at school. Nitta's Oyabun finds it endearing and gets his lawyer to write Hina's speech for her, which she then repeats verbatim. Being only a first-year, Hina is chosen as Secretary instead, but she never attends a single meeting, so Hitomi is pressed into service instead. Nitta tries to invite Utako out, but she refuses to leave her bar. Later, Hina and Hitomi get Utako to reluctantly agree to a date with Nitta. However, Nitta accidentally breaks Hina's foot while celebrating. Hina tells Nitta to go on the date anyway, and then Utako rejects him, thinking that he's too attached to caring for Hina.
8	"And It's The Same Old Hina"; Transliteration: "Soshite Hina wa Itsumodōri" (Japanese: そしてヒナはいつも通り)	May 25, 2018
Kei Ikaruga, the Security Chief of the mysterious organization, meets with Anzu in the present day to observe Hina and determine if she has improved after causing massive destruction in their original timeline. To Kei's shock, Hina passes her checklist, and Kei is dismayed to find out that Hina must be returned to her own time after doing so. One day, Hina's classmate Mami Shinjou sees Hina using her telekinesis to throw away trash, and tries to learn the secrets of using psychic powers herself. Hina humors her for a couple days, using her own powers to make Mami feel accomplished, but Mami humiliates herself when she tries to demonstrate her powers in class without Hina's help. Finally, Kei talks to Hina directly, telling her that they will travel back to their original time in three days. After struggling to tell Nitta, Hina finally tells him, and is treated to her favorite food before leaving. However, she discovers she cannot return after Nitta threw her original pod ball away. Hina returns to Nitta's apartment, only to find him in the middle of celebrating his new "freedom."
9	"Life is about Survival"; Transliteration: "Jinsei wa Sabaibaru" (Japanese: 人生はサバイバル)	June 1, 2018
Kei decides to summon Mao from her organization to bring an extra transport pod to pick up Hina, but Mao drops on a deserted island and accidentally loses both her orb and her spare in the surf. After searching for the orbs with no luck, Mao creates puppet versions of Hina and Anzu to talk to while enjoying her time on the island. Months later, she breaks down and tosses them away, before creating a makeshift raft and sailing away. Meanwhile, Nitta tries to arrange his boss to be the next head of the family. After Hina suggests that Nitta should be the new leader, the Oyabun indulges her for a moment before Nitta steers it back to Kiyoshi. However, Sabu already texted Kiyoshi about the first part of their conversation, which leads him to bury Nitta in cement until the Oyabun himself has to clear it up. Kiyoshi awkwardly decides to name Nitta a Lieutenant while he's still buried in cement. Later, Hina asks everyone how to celebrate Nitta's promotion; however, when Nitta gets home, he discovers to his horror that what Hina has set up looks more like a funeral (his).
10	"Like a River Stream"; Transliteration: "Kawa no Nagare no Yōni" (Japanese: 川の流れのように)	June 8, 2018
Hitomi's mother doesn't believe her when she honestly tells her about her bartending job. Utako, wanting to keep her bar's money-maker, pressures Hitomi into renting an apartment on her own, and then steers her towards various temp jobs to pay for it. The stress of so much work builds up to the point where Hitomi collapses in the doorway of her apartment. As Utako and her regulars throw a housewarming party at Hitomi's place, Hitomi invites her mother to sabotage the arrangement and help her return to a normal life, but instead, her mother is pleased that Hitomi made so many connections with various companies and approves, leaving Hitomi without an out. Meanwhile, Anzu gets 5,000 Yen from her parents in allowance. While shopping with Hitomi, Anzu settles on a shoulder massaging device for her parents, but is short of the required money, when Sabu appears and takes her to a local horse racetrack. Anzu wins the bet on her first race, but then loses her money on the rest of them. Returning home, Anzu gives her parents a personal shoulder massage instead.
11	"A Man Thirsty for Blood, Violence and Money"; Transliteration: "Chi to Bōryoku to Kane ni ueta Otoko" (Japanese: 血と暴力と金に餓えた男)	June 15, 2018
A video journalist interviews Nitta in hopes of getting a scoop on modern-day Yakuza. Unfortunately, Nitta is a lot nicer than he expected, forcing the journalist to edit and outright fabricate parts of the interview to make Nitta seem more evil. The faked TV special embarrasses Nitta in front of his yakuza bosses. Later, while Hina is out on a ski trip with her class, Anzu stays with Nitta. After getting jealous of Anzu's upbeat attitude, Nitta tries to spoil her and drag her down to Hina's level. However, Anzu's demeanor becomes too much for Nitta, and he instead starts seeing Anzu as the perfect daughter; the streak is unfortunately ended the next day as Anzu has to return home. After she leaves, Nitta receives a call that Hina went missing in the mountains during the skiing trip.
12	"Yukimatsuri"; Transliteration: "Yuki Matsuri" (Japanese: 雪まつり)	June 22, 2018
Hina is lost in the mountains with Hitomi and two other classmates. After building an igloo, Hina tries to prove that she can use her powers to help out, but runs out of energy after going hungry. The next morning, the group tries feeding Hina some pretend ikura sushi with snow to raise her spirits. Eventually, a rescue crew finds them after Hina uses her powers to make a giant ikura sushi sculpture out of snow. The show returns to the present three years later, where Mao is the top student at a Chinese qigong school of "Superhuman Martial Arts" while a Japanese street rocker tries to learn how to recreate Hina's "Rockusion" stunt from before. After meeting at a teahouse, Mao and the rocker both think the other person is insane. When the rocker mentions Hina's name, Mao decides to travel back to Japan with him, but the other members of the school try to stop them both. After a big fight, the Sifu of the school tries to use an unfair trial to convince her to stay, but Mao subtly uses her powers to beat it. The Sifu reluctantly allows her to leave for Japan to create more branches of the school, while Mao looks forward to meeting her colleagues from the future.

== Reception ==
Hinamatsuri was nominated for the 52nd Seiun Awards in the Best Comic category in 2021.

== See also ==
- Joshikōsei Joreishi Akane!, another manga series by the same author
- JM, another manga series by the same author
