= List of Hot 100 number-one singles of 2026 (Japan) =

The following is a list of weekly number-one singles on the Billboard Japan Hot 100 chart in 2026.

== Chart history ==
M!lk(leader Jinto Yoshida pictured) scored their first and second number-one singles with "Bakuretsu Aishiteru" and "That's!Chojo". As members of Ebidan, they are also featured on "Yes! Tokyo", which topped the chart for three non-consecutive weeks in 2026.

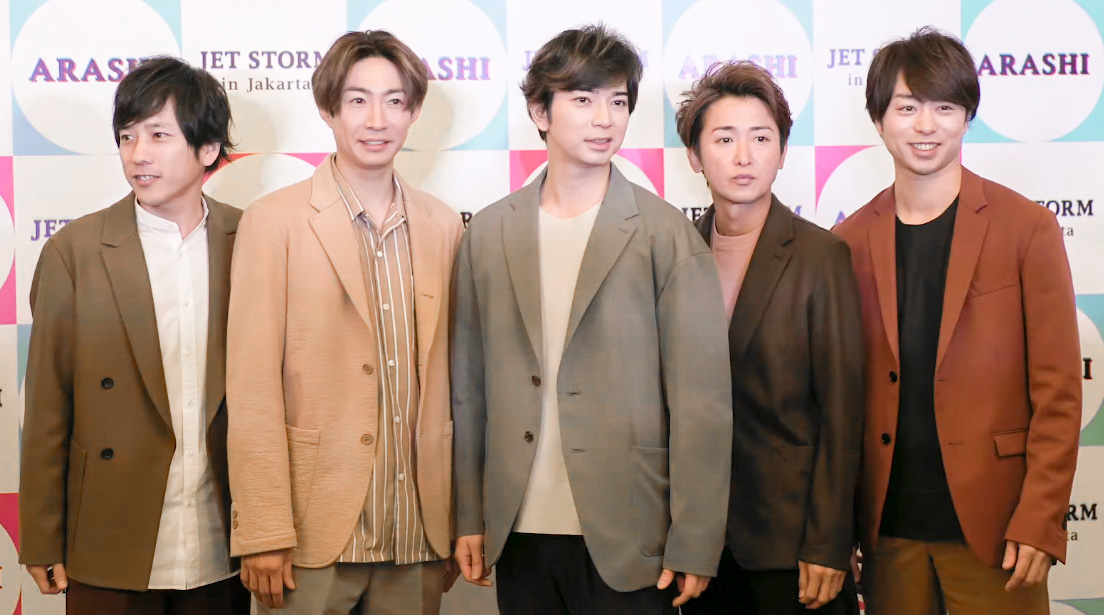
Arashi scored their 38th number-one single with "Five", their final single before disbanding, expanding the record for the most number-one songs by a male group. "Five" topped the chart for two non-consecutive weeks in 2026.

Number-one singles of 2026 on the Japan Hot 100
Issue date	Song	Artist(s)	Ref.
January 7	"Iris Out"	Kenshi Yonezu	
January 14	"Iris Out"	Kenshi Yonezu	
January 21	"Lulu"	Mrs. Green Apple	
January 28	"Lulu"	Mrs. Green Apple	
February 4	"3XL"	Number_i	
February 11	"Stars"	Snow Man	
February 18	"Aizo"	King Gnu	
February 25	"Bakuretsu Aishiteru"	M!lk	
March 4	"Odorōze!"	Snow Man	
March 11	"Five"	Arashi	
March 18	"The Growing Up Train"	Sakurazaka46	
March 25	"Be First All Day"	Be First	
April 1	"Waltz for Lily"	King & Prince	
April 8	"Gekiyaku Chūdoku"	=Love	
April 15	"Saigo ni Kaidan o Kakeagatta no wa Itsu da?"	Nogizaka46	
April 22	"Kagenimo-Hinatanimo"	Travis Japan	
April 29	"All 4 U"	INI	
May 6	"3XL"	Number_i	
May 13	"Bang!!"	Snow Man	
May 20	"Gachi Muchū!"	Bullet Train	
May 27	"Kind of Love"	Hinatazaka46	
June 3	"Cute na Kyutai"	Cutie Street	
June 10	"Keshiki"	Ji Blue	
June 17	"Lonesome Rabbit"	Sakurazaka46	
June 24	"Karasu"	Kenshi Yonezu	
July 1	"Ai Kudasai Mase"	≠Me	
July 8	"Missing"	Be First	
July 15	"Good Time"	Snow Man	
July 22	"Bugs Life"	Number_i	
July 29	"Zehi ni Oyobazu"	Nogizaka46	
August 5	"Kienai Hanabi"	Timelesz	
August 12	"Soda Soda"	TWS	
August 19	"Yes! Tokyo"	Ebidan	
August 26	"Setsuna Hanabi"	Tomorrow X Together	
September 2	"Koi, Hajimemashita"	=Love	
September 9	"Yes! Tokyo"	Ebidan	
September 16	"Yes! Tokyo"	Ebidan	
September 23	"You Know What to Do"	INI	
September 30	"Rebon"	Number_i	
October 7	"Ichaicha Mushi"	Hinatazaka46	
October 14	"Ko1keyz"	Ko1keyz	
October 21	"Ai Must Be"	Sakurazaka46	
October 28	"Touch"	Mazzel	
November 4	"That's!Chojo"	M!lk	
November 11	"Emotion"	Ae! Group	
November 18	"Love Reason"	Genin wa Jibun ni Aru	

== See also ==
- List of Billboard Japan Hot Albums number ones of 2026
