= Chiikawa the Movie: The Secret of the Mermaid Island =

2026 Japanese film

- Theatrical release poster

Japanese name
- Kanji: 映画ちいかわ 人魚の島のひみつ
Transcriptions
- Revised Hepburn: Eiga Chiikawa Ningyo No Shima No Himitsu
- Directed by: Kei Oikawa
- Written by: Nagano
- Screenplay by: Nagano
- Based on: Chiikawa by Nagano
- Produced by: Masataka Komine; Naoto Shōji
- Starring: Haruka Aoki; Makoto Tanaka; Ari Ozawa; Minori Suzuki
- Cinematography: Masaharu Okazaki
- Edited by: Ayumu Takahashi
- Music by: Shūgo Tokumaru; Chikara Uemizutaru
- Production companies: Cypic (animation); QTORY (production)
- Distributed by: Toho
- Release date: 24 July 2026
- Running time: 99 minutes
- Country: Japan
- Language: Japanese
- Box office: ¥18.9 billion

Chiikawa the Movie: The Secret of the Mermaid Island (Japanese: 映画ちいかわ 人魚の島のひみつ) is a 2026 Japanese animated dark fantasy comedy film directed by Kei Oikawa, based on the manga series Chiikawa by Nagano. Produced by Cypic and distributed by Toho, it is the first film in the Chiikawa merchandise line. It was released in Japanese theatres on 24 July 2026.

== Plot ==
Once upon a time, Siren, a legendary creature whose song could work magic for plants, came to an island with three mermaids. The islanders offered tributes of food to the Siren, and she rewarded them with harvests by singing to crops help them grow. One day, the Siren was playing with the mermaids and unknowingly destroyed a boat with two islanders, Hitoha and Futaba on board. They had previously known that anyone who ate a mermaid could gain eternal life.

Futaba was badly injured, leading Hitoha to kill a mermaid and cook it at home. Futaba was revived and healed by gaining eternal life after being fed a piece of mermaid by Hitoha, but they were horrified at the thought of immortality with no one else around and made Hitoha eat it as well. Hitoha and Futaba then discovered a battery slot on their bottoms. They quickly understood the meaning of "eternal life" – when their "life" ran out, they could be "revived" by replacing the battery. They promised to keep the secret forever.

Meanwhile, furious at the death of one of her mermaids, Siren abducted and ate the islanders until the culprit was found. None of the other islanders knew about the disappearance of the mermaid or the reason for Siren's aggression. As a result, the islanders forbade anyone from contacting Siren and invited visitors from outside to help suppress Siren. In response, Siren also attacked visitors who tried to suppress her.

Usagi, one of Chiikawa's friends, receives an invitation letter to the island, which offered promising rewards. Many of the residents (recurrent characters of the series: Chiikawa, Hachiware, Usagi, Momonga, Furuhonya, Kurimanju, Shisa and Rakko) then follow to visit the island. There, they enjoy the meals and celebrate. At night, Chiikawa, Hachiware and Usagi accidentally enter the Siren's cave and learn about what happened to them.

The next day, an islander reveals the real reason the visitors were invited to the island was to help suppress Siren. A depiction of Siren scares off most of the visitors, leaving only Chiikawa and friends to help with the mission. Siren then attacks the village and visitors, and Chiikawa is the only one who manages to escape. Chiikawa encounters Shimajirō, the owner of a restaurant in a remote area who makes clam soup and spicy curry rice. Chiikawa, with Shimajirō's help, frees all the Siren's captives, while Shimajirō holds off the Siren, allowing everyone to escape. Convinced Siren would attack again, Rakko tries to conjure up a plan. Chiikawa, who ate Shimajirō's curry rice, suggests making a very spicy curry rice to disable Siren's singing attack.

Siren appears the next day. Chiikawa and friends force the spicy curry rice they prepared into her mouth, but Siren enjoys the spiciness and is unaffected by the curry. Then, Shimajirō protects others from Siren's attack and offers the Carolina Reaper, saying that it was the only pepper that would be overly spicy for her. After forcing the Carolina Reaper-laced curry into her mouth, Siren begins writhing in pain and hits Hachiware and Chiikawa with her tail. Futaba protects them, though the Siren knocks away her battery cover. Noticing the battery cover, Siren acknowledges Hachiware's plea to stop attacking the islanders and retreats to the waters to ease the spiciness in her mouth.

While nursing Futaba in their home, Chiikawa witnesses Hitoha replacing Futaba's battery. Combined with the knowledge of the mermaid scale in their home before, Chiikawa figures out Hitoha and Futaba were the ones who killed and ate the mermaid. At the celebration of the Siren's defeat, Chiikawa tries to talk to Hitoha and Futaba, but decides to keep the secret and returns to enjoy the party. The next day, Chiikawa and friends depart the island with gifts and cheers from the islanders. On the ship, Usagi sees and takes a mermaid scale from Hitoha's home in Chiikawa's pochette. As the ship moves, the scale drifts back towards the island by wind from Chiikawa's hand. Seeing the scale flying off, Chiikawa starts chatting with friends.

In the post-credits scene, Hitoha and Futaba are revealed to have fled the island; they arrive on a new island and decide to reside in a cave. In the nearby ocean, Siren and her two surviving mermaids swim towards the island, closing in on the two immortal fugitives.

== Cast ==
Casting of Chiikawa the Movie
Character	Voiced by
Chiikawa	Haruka Aoki
Hachiware	Makoto Tanaka
Usagi	Ari Ozawa
Siren	Minori Suzuki
Miso Picked Islander	Misato Matsuoka
Shisa	Miyuri Shimabukuro
Furuhonya	Momo Harumi
Hitoha	Momoka Terasawa
Futaba	Sayumi Suzushiro
Kuri Manjū	Takayuki Asai
Shimajirō	Tsuguo Mogami
Momonga	Yuka Iguchi
Rakko	Yūma Uchida

== Production ==
The film is based on the manga's "Siren Arc" (セイレーン編, Seirēn-hen) or "Island Arc", which was serialised from March to November 2023. The screenplay was written by Nagano, credited as the original story. Under Nagano's supervision, Kei Oikawa of Cypic was selected as the director. The opening and ending theme songs, respectively titled "Kutsuzure" (くつずれ; lit. 'Shoe Sore'), performed by Makoto Tanaka, "Tsukue Sasuru" (机さする; lit. 'Desk Rubbing'), performed by Haruka Aoki, are both written by Nagano.

Siren's visual design is based on an inu hariko (papier-mâché dog) for the upper body and a goldfish for the lower body. The inu hariko is a talisman believed to have originated in Nagoya's Atsuta Shrine, and is used to pray for fertility and safe childbirth, while the goldfish is a speciality product of Yatomi, Aichi Prefecture; This work features other elements evocative of Aichi, such as soy sauce and miso; the local preference for strongly flavoured dishes; curry reminiscent of CoCo Ichibanya, a company based in Aichi; Japanese manila clams, a seafood product for which Aichi boasts the highest catch volume in Japan; Kasugai City in Aichi is said to be the birthplace of Yao Bikuni who ate mermaid meat, and Shiruko Sand used as bait to lure out the mermaid.

"AA battery" in Japanese is usually shortened as tansan (単三), which is a homophone of the short name for carbonated beverages tansan (炭酸); It is also a soundalike of minor third (短三度, Tan-Sando), the music interval sung by a slain mermaid. The promotional song for the food stall that the islanders had been singing ever since the Siren arrived contains an acrostic message "We apologise. Please help us." (おわびじゃ たすけて, Owabija. Tasukete.).

The list of Okinawa topics performed by Shisa: Kōrēgusu is a kind of chili sauce common in Okinawa made by infused chili peppers in awamori (the distilled spirit); Yushi-Dohu is hand-made Shima tofu; "Yuntaku" means chatting with chill in Ryukyuan languages; The song Shisa sang is Union (フレッシュプラザ ユニオン)'s commercial jingle, a supermarket chain that operates only on Okinawa Island. A sourced song, Farewell to This Day is a well-known Japanese choral piece that was also used in Evangelion: 2.0 You Can (Not) Advance.

A second commercial released after the film's screening features the caption: "That friendship, that sin, and that life—forever."

== Music ==
The score was co-composed by Japanese musician Shugo Tokumaru and composer Chikara Uemizutaru. The film's original soundtrack was released in Japan on 24 July 2026 and contains a total of 52 tracks, of which 12 are vocal tracks (with lyrics sung by the cast) and 40 are instrumental background music (BGM) tracks. The album topped the Billboard Japan Hot Albums chart for the week of 10–16 August 2026, becoming the first soundtrack album in nearly seven years to reach number one on the chart.

== Release ==
Film ratings across airing locations
Country/Location	Rating	Reference
Japan	G	
Taiwan	6+	
Hong Kong	I	
Malaysia	P12	
South Korea	ALL	
Philippines	PG	
Singapore	PG	
Indonesia	13+	
Thailand	G	

The film was released in Japanese theatres by Toho on 24 July 2026. It was subsequently released in Taiwan, Hong Kong, and Southeast Asia – with the former two receiving Taiwanese Mandarin and Cantonese dubs alongside the original Japanese soundtrack, respectively.

=== Collaboration ===
Ahead of the film's release, Seven-Eleven Japan sold collaborative deli items themed around the movie from 17 July to 3 August; These included rose fish nitsuke evocative of mermaid meat. Panasonic sold AA batteries in special packaging as a collaborative product with this film as well. CoCo Ichibanya sold katsu curry with Manila clam topping and mango lassi during the first period, and lemon squash during the second period in dedicated plastic cups as a collaborative product with this film, as a novelty item. The curry came with a sticker, while the drink came with a spoon rest; in both cases, the purchaser could not choose the design, from 16 July to 31 August. Tokyo Skytree collaborated with Chiikawa the Movie; tower lighting and indoorinter [sic?] decorations, a collaboration café, and sales of character merchandise from 10 July to 31 October 2026.

== Reception ==
Chiikawa the Movie: The Secret of the Mermaid Island grossed ¥2.24 billion from 1.51 million tickets sold in its opening weekend, debuting at first place in the Japanese box office. By 23 August, the film had grossed over ¥10 billion, becoming the 21st Japanese anime film to surpass ¥10 billion at the box office. On 20 September, the film became the highest-grossing film of 2026 in Japan after surpassing Zootopia 2. As of 15 November, the film has grossed ¥18.9 billion from 12.98 million tickets sold. Outside Japan, it has grossed NT$174.9 million in Taiwan, HK$25.8 million in Hong Kong, US$172,990 in Indonesia, 24.2 billion đồng in Vietnam, and US$22.6 million in South Korea.

The film infamously involves bleak subjects such as revenge, murder, guilt, cannibalism, and eternal torment despite the series' light-hearted nature. Many social media users described the film as a "horror film" despite its marketing as a family one. Audience reactions were noticing gloom, such as a comparison of a wake, some young children were seen leaving in tears.

Some social media users compared the film to the works of Kanae Minato, a Japanese crime fiction writer best known for Confessions. Noticing the comparisons, Minato watched the film and praised it as "interesting", claiming without evidence that "a bad ending is more about reflecting on morality and what is right than enjoying others' sufferings". She also commented on Nagano's decision to avoid showing Hiroba and Futaba's faces, calling it "kind". Patrick St. Michel of The Japan Times compared the film to Crime and Punishment by Fyodor Dostoevsky. A review in The Yomiuri Shimbun praised the film as "approachable", with main characters who are easy to empathise with and a good artwork that can present the original manga world.

The film has been nominated for Best Animated Picture at the 51st Hochi Film Awards in 2026.
