= Chiikawa =

Japanese manga series

- First tankōbon volume cover

ちいかわ なんか小さくてかわいいやつ (Chiikawa: Nanka Chiisakute Kawaii Yatsu)
- Genre: Comedy; Dark fantasy; Slice of life
- Manga
- Written by: Nagano
- Published by: Kodansha
- Imprint: Wide KC Morning
- Original run: January 2020 – present
- Volumes: 9
- Anime television series
- Directed by: Takenori Mihara
- Music by: Shugo Tokumaru
- Studio: Doga Kobo
- Licensed by: Sentai Filmworks
- Original network: FNS (Fuji TV)
- Original run: April 4, 2022 – present
- Episodes: 382
- Anime film
- Chiikawa the Movie: The Secret of the Mermaid Island (2026)
- icon

Chiikawa: Nanka Chiisakute Kawaii Yatsu (Japanese: ちいかわ なんか小さくてかわいいやつ; lit. 'Chiikawa: Something Small and Cute') is a Japanese web manga series written and illustrated by Nagano. It follows the daily adventures of the titular protagonist, along with a series of animal-inspired characters. It has been serialized online via X since January 2020, and has been collected in nine tankōbon volumes by Kodansha, as of November 2026. By November 2024, Chiikawa had sold over 3.6 million copies, including digital versions in circulation.

An anime television series adaptation was produced by Doga Kobo and premiered in April 2022. The first season was broadcast in Japan from April 2022 to March 2025, with the second season premiering in July of that year. A film adaptation of the Siren Arc produced by Cypic, titled Chiikawa the Movie: The Secret of the Mermaid Island, was released on July 24, 2026.

== Synopsis ==
Chiikawa is set in a civilized world inhabited by small animal-like creatures known as chiikawas, armor-wearing figures known as Yoroi-san (armor people), and various monsters and other creatures. The story follows the daily adventures of the titular protagonist, Chiikawa and their friends as they enjoy delicious food, pursue hobbies, and find joy in everyday life, while navigating the constant dangers of their world. To earn money, some of them take on jobs assigned by the Yoroi-san, including weeding and hunting, which can be fatal.

== Production ==
The character of Chiikawa originated from a May 2017 tweet expressing Nagano's wish to escape modern life and become a simple creature that cries over its troubles, runs away from them, sleeps, and dances. Chiikawa, Hachiware, and Usagi were originally named Nitori, Ikeya, and Donki, respectively. The reason that Nagano chose Twitter was because of its immediacy and accessibility. By November 2020, Kodansha collected the comics into physical volumes, the first of which was published in February 2021.

A separate account was created in January 2020 and the manga began serialization. A book version was published by Kodansha on February 12, 2021. Prior to that, a one-shot story was published in that year's eleventh issue of Kodansha's seinen manga magazine Morning, released on February 10.

== Characters ==
Chiikawa (ちいかわ; lit. 'Something kind of small and cute')
Voiced by: Haruka Aoki
Chiikawa is the titular protagonist of the franchise. They are small-sized, have rounded ears and a teardrop-shaped tail, resembling a mouse or hamster. Early on, Chiikawa was named as Nitori. Cowardly, timid, and having a tendency to cry, they live in a house won in the Muchauma Yogurt lottery. Unlike some other characters, their speech is unintelligible to the audience – mostly saying things such as "yada" and "iya" – both of which are childish ways of saying "no" in Japanese. They primarily express themselves through sounds and facial expressions, but it can be understood to the rest of the cast.
Chiikawa passed the fifth grade weeding exam after three attempts, which stands in stark contrast to another main character, Hachiware, who passed it on the first try.
Hachiware (ハチワレ; lit. 'Eight-split' or 'Broken-helmet')
Voiced by: Makoto Tanaka (Japanese); Suzie Yeung (English)
Hachiware, originally named Ikeya, is a friend of both Chiikawa and Usagi and lives in a cave. Their name and design are based on those of a bicolor cat, but they are not one. They are depicted as sociable, curious, and optimistic, as well as being kind-hearted and willing to help their friends, especially Chiikawa. Hachiware is also an avid photographer, and they like the Charumera brand of instant ramen. Hachiware lives in a cave. Like Chiikawa, Hachiware has the Level 5 Weed Pulling Certification.
Hachiware's name originates from the blue marking on its head, which resembles the kanji for 'eight' (八), hence 'eight-split' (八割れ). The character is known as 'little eight' (小八) in Greater China.
Usagi (うさぎ; lit. 'Rabbit')
Voiced by: Ari Ozawa
Usagi, originally named Donki, is a friend of both Chiikawa and Hachiware. Depicted as high-spirited, they occasionally act as a troublemaker, but support their friends when they are in trouble. Similar to Chiikawa, Usagi is unintelligible to the audience, making noises such as "ura" and "yaha", but can be understood to the other characters. Usagi's name and design is based on those of a rabbit, but "may or may not" be one. They are mainly known for being eccentric and a foodie. Usagi is also revealed to hold a Level 3 Weed Pulling Certification, which they show to Chiikawa and Hachiware after the pair take the Level 5 exam.
Momonga (モモンガ; lit. 'Flying squirrel')
Voiced by: Iguchi Yuka
Momonga is a naughty and playful flying squirrel and diva. They are always focused on acting cute, begging for attention, and often throws tantrums in contrast with the others. Even during dangerous situations, they ask for food and rest. Momonga often "acts cute" in pursuit of their aims. Although they lack knowledge in social cues, they make an active effort to imitate other characters' cute actions, notably Chiikawa. They particularly often imitate Chiikawa's yawning and crying sounds. Moreover, despite being mostly depicted as doing things on their own, they start to hang out with Furuhonya in later chapters, albeit mostly for personal benefit. It is heavily implied that Dekatsuyo swapped bodies with Momonga with the help of a witch.
Kuri-Manjū (くりまんじゅう; lit. 'Chestnut bun')
Voiced by: Takayuki Asai
Kuri-manjū's character design is based on a honey badger and Kuri Manju, a Japanese confectionery bun made with chestnut fillings. They are always seen drinking alcohol, especially beer, and eating various foods, usually emitting a loud, exaggerated breath after taking a sip from their beverage. :Incidentally, in the region where they live, drinking alcohol is permitted only if the person carries a license that can be obtained by passing a difficult examination.
Rakko (ラッコ; lit. 'Sea otter')
Voiced by: Yuma Uchida
Rakko is a sea otter that excels in battle, and is top of the subjugation ranking. They have a cross-shaped scar above their right eye, don a white cape, and wield a double-edged broadsword with their face insignia on the hilt. Despite having a hard-boiled appearance, Rakko has some unmasculine aspects, such as: having a soft spot for desserts, and shuddering in agony during their first dip in a cold water bath. They also can drive, sometimes singing loudly to stave off drowsiness.
Shisa (シーサー, Shīsā)
Voiced by: Miyuri Shimabukuro
Shisa is a hard-working chiikawa critter with multiple occupations, most notably as an employee at the Ramen Restaurant Rou, and as apprentice of Ramen no Yoroi-san. They hold the "Super Part-Timer" certification, another qualification that is difficult to obtain. Shisa is also frequently seen with Kuri-Manjū, offering them food, or learning about liquor so they can obtain a drinking license. Their character design is based on the Ryukyuan cultural artifact of the same name. So sometimes, they use the Miyakoan language and reference local topics from Okinawa Prefecture.

Furuhonya (古本屋; lit. 'Used book store')

Voiced by: Momo Harumi
Furuhonya is a kind and peaceful used-bookseller. They are a pink critter, roughly resembling a naked mole rat, wearing a crab claw-inspired headband, made by Pochette no Yoroi-san, and gifted by Momonga. Although initially a faceless mob character, Furuhonya had their design revealed after Momonga gifted said headband. Their official name is Furuhonya (古本屋), but author Nagano put the subtitle Kani (カニ; lit. 'Crab') underneath the frame of their face reveal, earning the nickname Kani-chan (カニちゃん).
Kabutomushi (カブトムシ; lit. 'Beetle')
Voiced by: Shiori Mutou (original form) and Kentaro Tone (Mimic form)
Kabutomushi, also known as Chiikabu, is a playful rhinoceros beetle-like creature that becomes Chiikawa's friend. It shows a cute appearance and personality towards the other critters, but in reality, Kabutomushi is a mimicking monster who lures in chiikawa critters to eat.
Anoko (あのこ; lit. 'That kid')
Voiced by: Yoshino Aoyama
Anoko, originally known as Grey no Ko (グレーの子, Gurei no ko; lit. 'The grey kid') is a wild and dangerous chimera that originally had the body of a chiikawa critter that worked alongside Chiikawa at a lemon-labeling factory. Though they recall memories of being a chiikawa critter, they don't seem to regret transforming into a chimera, as they are pleased to be significantly stronger than the chiikawa critters that come to hunt them down.
Dekatsuyo (でかつよ; lit. 'Big strong')
Voiced by: Taiki Yamashita
Dekatsuyo is a chimera that roughly resembles a furry spider. Despite being usually docile and timid, they show extreme aggression towards Momonga, for the two allegedly had their bodies forcibly swapped by an evil witch. Dekatsuyo hangs out with Anoko at times, but dreads the latter toying with/snacking on chiikawa critters.
Pochette no Yoroi-san (ポシェットの鎧さん; lit. 'Body-Armor with Pochette')
Voiced by: Tomokazu Sugita
One of the humanoid species that wears silver armor and carries a pink pouch that they crafted themself. They are kind-hearted (though they are scolded at times for said behavior towards the chiikawa critters), and often makes costumes for the main trio (Chiikawa, Hachiware, and Usagi) to try out. They are good friends with Rōdō no Yoroi-San and Ramen no Yoroi-san, the three often hanging out together.
Rōdō no Yoroi-san (労働の鎧さん; lit. 'Body-Armor Labor')
Voiced by: Hiroki Tōchi
A humanoid character wearing grey armor that manages the job booth where the chiikawa critters sign up for the day's tasks.
Ramen no Yoroi-san (ラーメンの鎧さん; lit. 'Body-Armor of Ramen shop')
Voiced by: Yoshitsugu Matsuoka
A humanoid character wearing yellow armor that works at the Ramen Restaurant "Rou" (it is inspired by Ramen Jiro). Shisa apprentices under them as part of the Super Part-timer Program.
Pajama Parties (パジャマパーティーズ, Pajama Pātīzu)
Pajama Parties is a music unit that sings and dances whilst wearing different colored pajamas made by Pochette no Yoroi-san. The group consists of Midori, Pinku, Murasaki and Shiro. Their signature song is "Pajama Parties no Uta" (パジャマパーティーズのうた, Pajama Pātīzu no Uta; lit. 'Pajama Parties' Song'). Before they perform in a music festival, Pinku, Murasaki, and Shiro were kidnapped by a giant, bird-like chimera, leaving them with scars on their faces and ears missing.

Midori (みどり; lit. 'Green')
Voiced by: Sumire Morohoshi
The creator, leader and songwriter of Pajama Parties. They have cow-like horns and tail and wears green pajamas, hence their handle. After their friends were abducted by the bird-like chimera, they asked the main trio to join Pajama Parties as substitute members.
Pinku (ぴんく; lit. 'Pink')
Voiced by: Maria Naganawa
A Pajama Parties member resembling a pig, and wearing pink pajamas, hence their handle. They lost their right ear and gained a giant cross-shaped scar on their face by the bird-like chimera.
Murasaki (むらさき; lit. 'Purple')
Voiced by: Mari Uchiyama
A Pajama Parties member, like Chiikawa, resembling a mouse and/or hamster, and wearing purple pajamas, hence their handle. They lost their left ear by the bird-like chimera.
Shiro (しろ; lit. 'White')
Voiced by: Yu Sasahara
A Pajama Parties wearing white pajamas, hence the handle. They have a shark fin-esque horn on their head and seemingly no ears. They gained a giant cross-shaped scar on their face by the bird-like chimera.

== Media ==
=== Manga ===
No.	Japanese release date	Japanese ISBN
1	February 12, 2021	978-4-06-522396-3 (regular edition); 978-4-06-522729-9 (special edition)
2	August 23, 2021	978-4-06-524251-3 (regular edition); 978-4-06-524252-0 (special edition)
3	March 23, 2022	978-4-06-526611-3 (regular edition); 978-4-06-527386-9 (special edition)
4	July 22, 2022	978-4-06-528650-0 (regular edition); 978-4-06-528579-4 (special edition)
5	January 23, 2023	978-4-06-530183-8 (regular edition); 978-4-06-530276-7 (special edition)
6	December 21, 2023	978-4-06-533982-4 (regular edition); 978-4-06-533983-1 (special edition)
7	November 21, 2024	978-4-06-537544-0 (regular edition); 978-4-06-537540-2 (special edition)
8	November 21, 2025	978-4-06-541413-2 (regular edition); 978-4-06-541412-5 (special edition)
9	November 20, 2026	978-4-06-545553-1 (regular edition); 978-4-06-545550-0 (special edition)

=== Anime ===
In October 2021, it was announced that Chiikawa would receive an anime adaptation by Doga Kobo. The production team decided that Chiikawa and Hachiware would be voiced by then-child actors, with Nagano taking part in the casting process. It is directed by Takenori Mihara and Juria Matsumura (beginning with episode 121), with Yuma Yamaguchi and Shugo Tokumaru composing the music. The series premiered on April 4, 2022, on Fuji TV's Mezamashi TV morning news and entertainment program. Sentai Filmworks licenses the series outside of Asia. In 2022, 120 English subtitled episodes were released on Hidive, however the series left the service in October 2025. In August 2026, 20 English subtitled episodes were made available on the free streaming service Amasian TV. In September 2026, it was announced that English dubbed episodes would be released through the anime's official English YouTube channel, starting on October 1.

In March 2025, it was announced the anime would be on a three-month hiatus before resuming in July. In September 2026, it was announced the anime would go on a three-month hiatus before resuming in January 2027.

An anime film adaptation of the Siren Arc, titled Chiikawa the Movie: The Secret of the Mermaid Island (映画ちいかわ 人魚の島のひみつ, Eiga Chiikawa: Ningyo no Shima no Himitsu) was announced on November 24, 2025. It was produced by Cypic and directed by Kei Oikawa, with Nagano writing the film's script. The film was released on July 24, 2026.

=== Video game ===
A mobile game titled Chiikawa Pocket was released worldwide in March 2025. It is a casual, idle RPG where players can battle enemies, pull weeds to collect items, cook dishes in Om Nom Fest, a food festival, and decorate their in-game spaces. Players can also unlock outfits and customize characters such as Chiikawa, Hachiware, and Usagi. The game is free to play, with optional in-app purchases, and supports multiple languages. It is available in 43 countries, including the United States, Japan, South Korea, and Taiwan.

== Cultural impact and reception ==
According to publisher Kodansha, the Chiikawa manga had surpassed five million copies in circulation by 2026.the manga has been nominated for the 48th Kodansha Manga Award in 2024 in the General category. The series won the 53rd Japan Cartoonists Association Award in the Manga Division. Chiikawa merchandise rose to popularity in China and Hong Kong in early 2024.

== Collaborations and merchandise ==
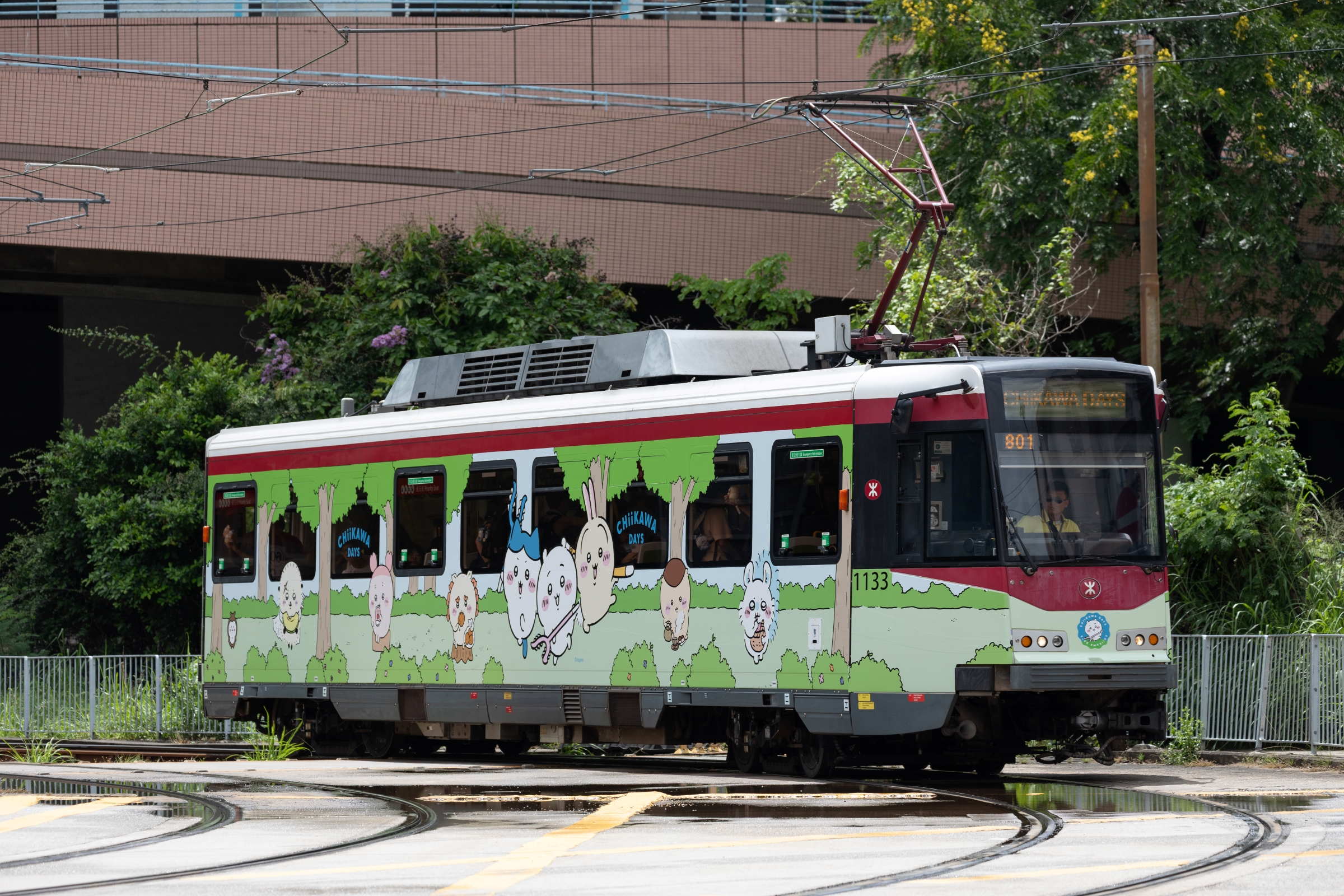
A Chiikawa-themed tram in Hong Kong

Chiikawa has given rise to a variety of merchandise. On the official online store, there are various products designed based on the anime characters, including plush toys, stickers, clothing, and more. Co-branding between Chiikawa and other comics or companies are also well-received. The official Chiikawa website has collaborated with Sanrio, Hankyu, and Converse, among others. A wide range of themed products are also offered, including magical girl series, sushi series, and Lailai Chinese restaurants series. In July 2025, Chiikawa Park opened in Tokyo, Japan.

Chiikawa collaborated with Ariana Grande on the music video for "Santa Tell Me". Popular characters from Chiikawa were dressed as Santa Claus and the music video was animated. Since the video's release on December 6, 2023, it was viewed approximately 1.38 million times in a single day, further increasing the popularity of Chiikawa. In September 2024, Chiikawa stickers was released in Japanese Happy Meals. Chiikawa, among other Japanese brands, partnered with Major League Baseball for the 2025 Tokyo Series.
