= Ari Ozawa =

Japanese voice actress (born 1992)

- 小澤亜李
- Born: August 10, 1992 (age 34); Tokyo, Japan
- Occupation: Voice actress
- Years active: 2013–present
- Agent: I'm Enterprise
- Notable work: Monthly Girls' Nozaki-kun as Chiyo Sakura; This Art Club Has a Problem! as Mizuki Usami; Monster Musume as Papi; BanG Dream! as Hina Hikawa; The Asterisk War as Kirin Toudou; School-Live! as Kurumi Ebisuzawa; The Promised Neverland as Conny; Genshin Impact as Xiangling; Chiikawa as Usagi
- Spouse: Hige Driver (m. 2020)
- Children: 1

Ari Ozawa (小澤亜李, Ozawa Ari; born August 10, 1992) is a Japanese voice actress affiliated with I'm Enterprise, which she joined in April 2013.

== Biography ==
Ozawa decided to become a voice actress after becoming a fan of Negima! in Grade 7 of middle school. She made her major debut as Chiyo Sakura in Monthly Girls' Nozaki-kun. Ozawa is married to Hige Driver, a Japanese musician who mainly focuses on Chiptune music. They have a child born on New Year's Day 2023.

== Filmography ==
=== TV anime ===
==== 2013 ====
- Monthly Girls' Nozaki-kun as Chiyo Sakura

==== 2015 ====
- Aquarion Logos as Karan Uminagi
- Classroom Crisis as Mizuki Sera
- Etotama as Umatan
- Jewelpet: Magical Change as Airi Kirara
- Komori-san Can't Decline as Megumi Nishitori
- Lance N' Masques as Makio Kidōin
- Mikagura School Suite as Otone Fujishiro
- Monster Musume as Papi
- Noragami Aragato as Tsuguha
- The Rolling Girls as Nozomi Moritomo
- Wakaba Girl as Wakaba Kohashi
- School-Live! as Kurumi Ebisuzawa
- The Asterisk War as Kirin Todo

==== 2016 ====
- Active Raid as Asami Kazari
- Bubuki Buranki as Kogane Asabuki
- Flying Witch as Aru
- Magic of Stella as Ayame Seki
- This Art Club Has a Problem! as Mizuki Usami
- Undefeated Bahamut Chronicle as Airi Arcadia
- WWW.Working!! as Rui Nagata

==== 2017 ====
- Aikatsu Stars! as Suzu
- Akashic Records of Bastard Magic Instructor as Re=L Rayford
- ID-0 as Fa-Loser
- Land of the Lustrous as Benitoite

==== 2018 ====
- BanG Dream! Girls Band Party! Pico as Hina Hikawa
- Caligula as Naruko Morita
- Hinamatsuri as Mao
- Märchen Mädchen as Tatiana Boyarskii
- Record of Grancrest War as Cammy
- The Seven Heavenly Virtues as Metatron
- Oshiete Mahou no Pendulum: Rilu Rilu Fairilu as Spica

==== 2019 ====
- Endro! as Fai Fai
- Kaguya-sama: Love is War as Moeha Fujiwara
- Nobunaga Teacher's Young Bride as Ikoma Kitsuno
- Special 7: Special Crime Investigation Unit as Bellemer "Ninja" Cinq
- The Promised Neverland as Conny
- YU-NO: A Girl Who Chants Love at the Bound of this World as Yuno

==== 2020 ====
- BanG Dream! Girls Band Party! Pico: Ohmori as Hina Hikawa
- Kakushigoto as Silvia Kobu
- King's Raid: Successors of the Will as Cleo
- Plunderer as Lynn May
- Sleepy Princess in the Demon Castle as Sakkyun (Bussy)

==== 2021 ====
- Back Arrow as Elsha Lean
- BanG Dream! Girls Band Party! Pico Fever! as Hina Hikawa
- I've Been Killing Slimes for 300 Years and Maxed Out My Level as Vania
- Let's Make a Mug Too: Second Kiln as Himena Tokikawa

==== 2022 ====
- Chiikawa as Usagi
- Extreme Hearts as Lise Kohinata
- She Professed Herself Pupil of the Wise Man as Meilin

==== 2026 ====
- Jujutsu Kaisen as Remi

==== 2027 ====
- Multi-Mind Mayhem as Teresa

=== Original net animation (ONA) ===
- Bastard!! Heavy Metal, Dark Fantasy (2022) as Sean Ari

=== Video games ===
- 404 Game Re:set as Pongo
- Azur Lane as USS Denver
- Grand Chase Dimensional Chaser Global as Mari Ming Ornette
- Shirohime Quest as Odawara, Kasugayama, Kanazawa, Matsumoto, Yamagata
- Kantai Collection as German cruiser Prinz Eugen, Japanese destroyer Akizuki, Japanese destroyer Nowaki, HMS Janus, Destroyer Princess, and Aircraft Carrier Water Demon
- Alice Gear Aegis as Ayaka Ichijō
- Onsen Musume as Ureshino
- Genshin Impact as Xiangling
- Heaven Burns Red as Kozue Hiiragi
- Fate Grand Order as Iyo
- Sword Art Online: Integral Factor as Koharu

=== Films ===
- Pop in Q (2016) as Asahi Ōmichi
- BanG Dream! Film Live (2019) as Hina Hikawa
- BanG Dream! Film Live 2nd Stage (2021) as Hina Hikawa
- Dream Animals: The Movie (2025) as Rabbit
- Chiikawa the Movie: The Secret of the Mermaid Island (2026) as Usagi
