= Nagano (illustrator) =

Japanese illustrator and manga artist

nagano
- ナガノ
- Born: 1988 (age 37–38); Japan
- Other name: ながの (Kana)
- Occupations: Illustrator; Cartoon artist Author
- Years active: 2018–present
- Notable work: Chiikawa series
- Style: Manga

Nagano (ナガノ or ながの; stylized in all lowercase) (born 1988) is a Japanese illustrator most known for her creation of the Chiikawa series.

== Early work ==
In 2013, Nagano designed Shibushi Shishimaru, a lion-like character wearing a samurai helmet for the tourism association of Shibushi, Kagoshima.

== LINE Creators Market ==
Nagano began releasing stickers on the LINE Creators Market after its launch in 2014, beginning with Jibun Tsukkomi Kuma (自分ツッコミくま), now more commonly known as "Nagano's Bear" (ナガノのくま). She released other original characters including Pagu-san and Burikko Usagi and reached the top of the Japanese creator rankings multiple times. She was named LINE creator of the month in December 2017. In 2018, she collaborated with Pokémon on the Mō ii! Modore! Pikachu! (もういい!もどれ!ピカチュウ!) sticker set, followed by a range of Pokémon Center merchandise in 2019.

From 2019 to 2021, she serialized MOGUMOGU Tabearuki Kuma, a food-travelogue comic staring Jibun Tsukkomi Kuma in Kodansha's digital magazine Weekly D Morning.

== Chiikawa series ==
The character of Chiikawa originated from a May 2017 tweet expressing Nagano's wish to escape modern life and become a simple creature that cries over its troubles, runs away from them, sleeps, and dances. She posted her works on X (Twitter).

In 2026, Chiikawa the Movie: The Secret of the Mermaid Island, was released, which adapts the manga's "Siren Arc". The screenplay, story and movie was written by Nagano. Nagano also wrote the movie's opening theme song "Kutsuzure" (くつずれ, lit. "Shoe Sore") and closing theme song "Tsukue Sasuru" (机さする, lit. "Desk Rubbing").

== Awards ==
In 2024, Nagano received the Grand Prize in the manga division of the 53rd Japan Cartoonists Association Award for Chiikawa.
