= Haruka Aoki =

Japanese actress (born 2011)

- 青木遥
- Born: December 3, 2011 (age 14); Tokyo, Japan
- Occupations: Actress; Voice actress
- Years active: 2022–present

Haruka Aoki (青木遥, Aoki Haruka) (born December 3, 2011) is a Japanese actress who is affiliated with Production Ace.

== Biography ==
Aoki, known for her loud speaking voice as a child, joined a voice acting agency and began voice acting in Grade 3 of elementary school. In 2022, she made her first appearance in Chiikawa as the titular protagonist. That same year, Aoki also voiced Chiikawa in the collaboration update of video game Shadowverse.

In 2023, together with voice actors Tomokazu Sugita and Kaori Maeda, Aoki appeared in a radio commercial for UR rental housing (UR賃貸住宅ラジオ, UR Chintai Jūtaku Rajio) managed by the Japan Urban Revitalization Agency.

== Filmography ==
Year	Film	Role	Note(s)	Ref.
2022	Chiikawa	Chiikawa (voice)	Anime television series	
2025	Ameku M.D.: Doctor Detective	Patient (Episode 1)/Soichiro Suzuhara (Episode 7)	Drama adaptation	
2026	Chiikawa the Movie: The Secret of Mermaid Island	Chiikawa (voice)	Film adaptation of Chiikawa	

== Discography ==
Year	Title	Album	Label
2026	"Tsukue Sasuru"	Chiikawa the Movie: The Secret of Mermaid Island (Original Motion Picture Soundtrack)	Milan Records
