= Seiyu Award for Best Rookie Actress =

Japanese voice acting award

- Awarded for: Best Performance by a Rookie Actress
- Country: Japan
- First award: 2007
- Currently held by: Kanata Aikawa; Hikaru Akao; Nene Hieda; Hinaki Yano (2022)

The Seiyu Award for Best Rookie Actress is one of the awards at the Seiyu Awards. Starting in 2023, "Best New Actors" is no longer separated by gender.

== Winners ==
Winners	Agency	Characters	Anime	Ref
2007
Yui Kano	Aoni Production	Momoko Kuzuryu	Sumomomo, Momomo	
Aya Hirano	Space Craft	Haruhi Suzumiya	The Melancholy of Haruhi Suzumiya	
2008
Emiri Kato	81 Produce	Momoko Akatsutsumi/Hyper Blossom; Kagami Hiiragi	Powerpuff Girls Z Lucky Star	
Yu Kobayashi	Holy Peak	Sarutobi Ayame; Kaere Kimura	Gintama; Sayonara Zetsubō Sensei	
2009
Kana Asumi	81 Produce	Yuno; Natsumi Hirakawa	Hidamari Sketch 365; Kyo no Go no Ni	
Haruka Tomatsu	Music Ray'n	Shiho Sannomiya; Nagi; Lala Satalin Deviluke	Zettai Karen Children; Kannagi: Crazy Shrine Maidens; To Love-Ru	
2010
Kanae Ito	Aoni Production	Mihoshi Akeno; Koume Suzukawa	Sora no Manimani; Taishō Baseball Girls	
Aki Toyosaki	Music Ray'n	Yui Hirasawa; Kana Nakamachi	K-On! Kanamemo	
2011
Hisako Kanemoto	Production Baobab	Ika Musume; Kanata Sorami	Squid Girl; So Ra No Wo To	
Satomi Satō	Aoni Production	Wendy Marvell; Manami Tamura; Ritsu Tainaka	Fairy Tail; Ore no Imōto ga Konna ni Kawaii Wake ga Nai; K-On!!	
2012
Ai Kayano	Pro-Fit	Meiko "Menma" Honma; Kanade Ōe	Anohana: The Flower We Saw That Day; Chihayafuru	
Shiori Mikami	Aoni Production	Akari Akaza; Kaibashira-chan	YuruYuri; Sakiika-kun	
2013
Kaori Ishihara	Style Cube	Aladdin	Magi: The Labyrinth of Magic	
Rumi Ōkubo	81 Produce	Chinatsu Yoshikawa	YuruYuri♪♪	
2014
Maaya Uchida	I'm Enterprise	Hajime Ichinose	Gatchaman Crowds	
2015
Sora Amamiya	Music Ray'n	Akame	Akame ga Kill!	
Reina Ueda	81 Produce	Naru Sekiya	Hanayamata	
Aya Suzaki	I'm Enterprise	Tamako Kitashirakawa	Tamako Love Story	
2016
Sumire Uesaka	Space Craft	Fubuki; Anastasia	Kantai Collection; The Idolmaster Cinderella Girls	
Rie Takahashi	81 Produce	Futaba Ichinose; Kobayashi	Seiyu's Life! Rampo Kitan: Game of Laplace	
Aimi Tanaka	81 Produce	Umaru Doma; Ryū Yuien	Himouto! Umaru-chan; Lance N' Masques	
2017
Ari Ozawa	I'm Enterprise	Mizuki Usami	This Art Club Has a Problem!	
Sayaka Senbongi	I'm Enterprise	Mumei	Kabaneri of the Iron Fortress	
Minami Tanaka	81 Produce	Katia Waldheim	Schwarzesmarken	
2018
Ayaka Nanase	Axl-One	Yoshino Koharu	Sakura Quest	
Yui Fukuo	81 Produce	Linze Silhoueska	In Another World With My Smartphone	
2019
Manaka Iwami	Pro-Fit	Maquia	Maquia: When the Promised Flower Blooms	
Tomori Kusunoki	Sony Music Artists	Llenn	Sword Art Online Alternative Gun Gale Online	
Coco Hayashi	81 Produce	Mirai Momoyama	Kiratto Pri Chan	
Rina Honnizumi	81 Produce	Saaya Yakushiji	Hugtto! PreCure	
Kaede Hondo	I'm Enterprise	Hitomi Mishima	Hinamatsuri	
2020
Madoka Asahina	81 Produce	Asumi Kominami	We Never Learn	
Miho Okasaki	I'm Enterprise	Rimuru Tempest	That Time I Got Reincarnated as a Slime	
Miyuri Shimabukuro	Office Osawa	Carole	Carole & Tuesday	
Sayumi Suzushiro	Arts Vision	Akira Ono	High Score Girl	
Ai Fairouz	Pro-Fit	Hibiki Sakura	How Heavy Are the Dumbbells You Lift?	
Nana Mori	Arbre	Hina Amano	Weathering with You	
2021
Rin Aira	Horipro	Wakaba Harukaze, Raki Kiseki	Aikatsu on Parade!	
Kana Ichinose	Sigma Seven	Yuzuriha Ogawa	Dr. Stone	
Riho Sugiyama	Mausu Promotion	Minare Koda	Wave, Listen to Me!	
Natsumi Fujiwara	Arts Vision	Abigail Jones	Great Pretender	
Azumi Waki	Haikyō	Adele von Ascham/Mile	Didn't I Say to Make My Abilities Average in the Next Life?!	
2022
Kanata Aikawa	Music Ray'n	Ai Ohto	Wonder Egg Priority	
Hikaru Akao	I'm Enterprise	Riri Hitotsuyanagi	Assault Lily Bouquet	
Nene Hieda	81 Produce	Miyako Muguruma	Warlords of Sigrdrifa	
Hinaki Yano	Sony Music Artists	Yu Takasaki	Love Live! Nijigasaki High School Idol Club	
