= Crunchyroll Anime Award for Best Drama =

- Awarded for: Best drama anime series of the previous year
- Country: United States; Japan
- First award: A-1 Pictures — Erased (2017)
- Currently held by: Toho Animation Studio and OLM — The Apothecary Diaries Season 2 (2026)

Highlights
- Most wins: Studio: Wit Studio / MAPPA (2); Anime: Attack on Titan (2)
- Most nominations: Studio: MAPPA / TMS Entertainment (4); Anime: Fruits Basket (3)
- Website: Crunchyroll Anime Awards

The Crunchyroll Anime Award for Best Drama is a genre-specific award given at the Crunchyroll Anime Awards since its inaugural edition in 2017. It is given for the best drama anime series from the previous year. Winners are determined through a combined voting process by judges and public voting.

Mystery anime Erased by A-1 Pictures first won the award in 2017. In the latest edition in 2026, the second season of The Apothecary Diaries by Toho Animation Studio and OLM won the award.

== Winners and nominees ==
In the following list, the first titles listed in gold are the winners; those not in gold are nominees, which are listed in alphabetical order. The years given are those in which the ceremonies took place.

=== 2010s ===
Year	Anime	Studio(s)
2016 (1st)
2016 (1st)	Erased	A-1 Pictures
2016 (1st)	Descending Stories: Showa Genroku Rakugo Shinju	Studio Deen
2016 (1st)	Joker Game	Production I.G
2016 (1st)	Kiznaiver	Studio Trigger
2016 (1st)	Most Popular "Other": Orange	TMS Entertainment
2017 (2nd)
2017 (2nd)	The Ancient Magus' Bride	Wit Studio
2017 (2nd)	ACCA: 13-Territory Inspection Dept.	Madhouse
2017 (2nd)	Descending Stories: Showa Genroku Rakugo Shinju (season 2)	Studio Deen
2017 (2nd)	Made in Abyss	Kinema Citrus
2017 (2nd)	March Comes in Like a Lion (season 2)	Shaft
2017 (2nd)	Scum's Wish	Lerche
2019 (4th)
2019 (4th)	Vinland Saga	Wit Studio
2019 (4th)	Babylon	Revoroot
2019 (4th)	Carole & Tuesday	Bones
2019 (4th)	Fruits Basket	TMS Entertainment
2019 (4th)	Stars Align	Eight Bit
2019 (4th)	The Promised Neverland	CloverWorks

=== 2020s ===
Year	Anime	Studio(s)
2020 (5th)
2020 (5th)	Fruits Basket (season 2)	TMS Entertainment
2020 (5th)	Beastars	Orange
2020 (5th)	Great Pretender	Wit Studio
2020 (5th)	Japan Sinks: 2020	Science SARU
2020 (5th)	Sing "Yesterday" for Me	Doga Kobo
2020 (5th)	Somali and the Forest Spirit	Satelight & HORNETS
2021 (6th)
2021 (6th)	To Your Eternity	Brain's Base
2021 (6th)	86	A-1 Pictures
2021 (6th)	Fruits Basket The Final Season (season 3)	TMS Entertainment
2021 (6th)	Kageki Shojo!!	Pine Jam
2021 (6th)	Odd Taxi	OLM and P.I.C.S.
2021 (6th)	Wonder Egg Priority	CloverWorks
2021/2022 (7th)
2021/2022 (7th)	Attack on Titan: The Final Season Part 2 (season 4 cour 2)	MAPPA
2021/2022 (7th)	86	A-1 Pictures
2021/2022 (7th)	Cyberpunk: Edgerunners	Studio Trigger and CD Projekt
2021/2022 (7th)	Dance Dance Danseur	MAPPA
2021/2022 (7th)	Kotaro Lives Alone	Liden Films
2021/2022 (7th)	Made in Abyss: The Golden City of the Scorching Sun (season 2)	Kinema Citrus
2022/2023 (8th)
2022/2023 (8th)	Attack on Titan: The Final Season The Final Chapters Special 1 (season 4 cour 3)	MAPPA
2022/2023 (8th)	Heavenly Delusion	Production I.G
2022/2023 (8th)	My Happy Marriage	Kinema Citrus
2022/2023 (8th)	Oshi no Ko	Doga Kobo
2022/2023 (8th)	To Your Eternity (season 2)	Drive
2022/2023 (8th)	Vinland Saga (season 2)	MAPPA
2023/2024 (9th)
2023/2024 (9th)	Frieren: Beyond Journey's End	Madhouse
2023/2024 (9th)	A Sign of Affection	Ajiado
2023/2024 (9th)	Dead Dead Demon's Dededede Destruction	Production +h.
2023/2024 (9th)	Oshi no Ko (season 2)	Doga Kobo
2023/2024 (9th)	Pluto	Studio M2
2023/2024 (9th)	The Apothecary Diaries	Toho Animation Studio and OLM
2025 (10th)
2025 (10th)	The Apothecary Diaries (season 2)	Toho Animation Studio and OLM
2025 (10th)	Anne Shirley	The Answer Studio
2025 (10th)	Blue Box	Telecom Animation Film
2025 (10th)	Orb: On the Movements of the Earth	Madhouse
2025 (10th)	Takopi's Original Sin	Enishiya
2025 (10th)	The Summer Hikaru Died	CygamesPictures

== Records ==
=== Anime series ===
Franchise	Wins	Nominations	Seasons
Attack on Titan	2	2	The Final Season Part 2, The Final Season The Final Chapters Special 1
Fruits Basket	1	3	Season 1, Season 2, The Final Season
The Apothecary Diaries	1	2	Season 1, Season 2
To Your Eternity	1	2	Season 1, Season 2
Vinland Saga	1	2	Season 1, Season 2
86	0	2	Part 1, Part 2
Descending Stories: Showa Genroku Rakugo Shinju	0	2	Season 1, Season 2
Made in Abyss	0	2	Season 1, The Golden City of the Scorching Sun
Oshi no Ko	0	2	Season 1, Season 2

=== Studios ===
Wit Studio holds the record for the most wins in an anime studio.

MAPPA also holds the record for the most wins, as well as being the most-nominated studio along with TMS Entertainment.

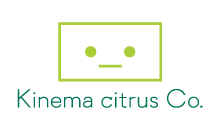
Doga Kobo and Kinema Citrus holds the record for the most nominations without a win in an anime studio.

Wit Studio and MAPPA were tied for the most wins in an anime studio with 2; the latter along with TMS Entertainment received the most nominations with 4. Attack on Titan became the only anime to win multiple awards. Fruits Basket, which was produced by TMS Entertainment, received the most nominations with 3; it won an award in 2021.

Doga Kobo and Kinema Citrus received the most nominations for an anime studio without a single win with 3. Four anime series (86, Descending Stories: Showa Genroku Rakugo Shinju, Made in Abyss, and Oshi no Ko) have received two nominations, but they did not win a single award.

Studio	Wins	Nominations	Seasons
MAPPA	2	4	Attack on Titan (The Final Season Part 2, The Final Season The Final Chapters Special 1), Dance Dance Danseur, Vinland Saga (Season 2)
Wit Studio	2	3	The Ancient Magus' Bride, Great Pretender, Vinland Saga (Season 1)
TMS Entertainment	1	4	Fruits Basket (Season 1, Season 2, The Final Season), Orange
A-1 Pictures	1	3	86 (Part 1, Part 2), Erased
Madhouse	1	3	ACCA: 13-Territory Inspection Dept., Frieren: Beyond Journey's End, Orb: On the Movements of the Earth
OLM	1	3	The Apothecary Diaries (Season 1, Season 2), Odd Taxi
Toho Animation Studio	1	2	The Apothecary Diaries (Season 1, Season 2)
Doga Kobo	0	3	Oshi no Ko (Season 1, Season 2), Sing "Yesterday" for Me
Kinema Citrus	0	3	Made in Abyss (Season 1, The Golden City of the Scorching Sun), My Happy Marriage
CloverWorks	0	2	The Promised Neverland, Wonder Egg Priority
Production I.G	0	2	Heavenly Delusion, Joker Game
Studio Deen	0	2	Descending Stories: Showa Genroku Rakugo Shinju (Season 1, Season 2)
Studio Trigger	0	2	Cyberpunk: Edgerunners, Kiznaiver
