= Strawberry shortcake =

Strawberry shortcake may refer to:

- Strawberry shortcake (dessert), a shortcake or sponge cake served with strawberries
- Strawberry Shortcake, a logo and franchise created by American Greetings
  - Strawberry Shortcake (TV series), a 2003–2008 animated series
- "Strawberry Shortcake", a 1968 song by Jay & the Techniques
- "Strawberry Shortcake", a 2019 song by Melanie Martinez from K–12
- Strawberry Shortcakes, a 2002 manga by Kiriko Nananan, and a 2006 film adaptation

== See also ==
- Strawberry on the Shortcake, a Japanese romance film
