= 16th Seiyu Awards =

Japanese voice acting awards ceremony in 2022

- Awarded for: Voice acting in Japan
- Date: March 5, 2022
- Location: JOQR Media Plus Hall; Minato, Tokyo
- Country: Japan

Highlights
- Best Lead Actor: Kensho Ono
- Best Lead Actress: Megumi Ogata
- Website: www.seiyuawards.jp

The 16th Seiyu Awards was held on March 5, 2022, at the JOQR Media Plus Hall in Minato, Tokyo. The winners of the Merit Awards, the Kei Tomiyama Award, the Kazue Takahashi Award, and the Synergy Award were announced on February 15, 2022. The rest of the winners were announced on the ceremony day.

Winners	Agency	Highlight Works
Best Actor in a Leading Role
Kensho Ono	Amino Produce	Hathaway Noa (Mobile Suit Gundam Hathaway)
Best Actress in a Leading Role
Megumi Ogata	Breathe Arts	Shinji Ikari (Evangelion: 3.0+1.0 Thrice Upon a Time)
Best Actors in Supporting Roles
Fumihiko Tachiki	Office Osawa	Gendo Ikari (Evangelion: 3.0+1.0 Thrice Upon a Time)
Fumihiko Tachiki	Office Osawa	Taizo Hasegawa (Gintama: The Very Final)
Yūichi Nakamura	INTENTION	Satoru Gojo (Jujutsu Kaisen)
Yūichi Nakamura	INTENTION	Yuichi Jin (World Trigger)
Best Actresses in Supporting Roles
Mikako Komatsu	Hirata Office	Maki Zenin (Jujutsu Kaisen)
Mikako Komatsu	Hirata Office	Maam (Dragon Quest: The Adventure of Dai)
Rie Takahashi	81 Produce	Emilia (Re:Zero − Starting Life in Another World 2nd Season)
Rie Takahashi	81 Produce	Hime Gotō (Kakushigoto Movie)
Best New Actors
Aoi Ichikawa	Office Osawa	Nagara (Sonny Boy)
Reiji Kawashima	Aoni Production	Fushi (To Your Eternity)
Gen Satō	I'm Enterprise	Fumiya Tomozaki (Bottom-tier Character Tomozaki)
Best New Actresses
Kanata Aikawa	Music Ray'n	Ai Ohto (Wonder Egg Priority)
Hikaru Akao	I'm Enterprise	Seria Morino (Gekidol)
Nene Hieda	81 Produce	Yuzu Izumi (Bottom-tier Character Tomozaki)
Hinaki Yano	Sony Music Artists	Yu Takasaki (Love Live! Nijigasaki High School Idol Club)
Singing Award
Winner	Agency	
Soma Saito	81 Produce	
Personality Award
Winner	Agency	Highlight Works
Takahiro Sakurai	INTENTION	A&G Media Station Comchat Countdown

Merit Award
Winners	Agency
Yōko Asagami	Aksent
Michihiro Ikemizu	Aoni Production
Kei Tomiyama Memorial Award
Winner	Agency
Kenichi Suzumura	INTENTION
Kazue Takahashi Memorial Award
Winner	Agency
Junko Iwao	J. Island
Game Award
Winner
Uma Musume Pretty Derby
Synergy Award
Winner
Evangelion: 3.0+1.0 Thrice Upon a Time
Special Honor Award
Winner
Belle
Kids/Family Award
Winner	Agency
Kyousei Tsukui	81 Produce
Foreign Movie/Series Award
Winner	Agency
Taiten Kusunoki	Amuleto
Kanako Tōjō	Axl-One
Influencer Award
Winner	Agency
Tomokazu Seki	Atomic Monkey
Most Valuable Seiyū Award
Winner	Agency
Hiro Shimono	I'm Enterprise
