= Kōkō Kyōshi =

- Genre: Drama
- Created by: Shinji Nojima
- Starring: Hiroyuki Sanada, Sachiko Sakurai
- Country of origin: Japan
- Original language: Japanese
- No. of episodes: 11

Original release
- Release: January 8 – March 19, 1993

Kōkō Kyōshi (Japanese: 高校教師; lit. "High School Teacher") is a Japanese TV series that aired from January 8 through March 19, 1993. It was written by Shinji Nojima, with Hiroyuki Sanada and Sachiko Sakurai playing the lead roles. It aired on TBS Television on Friday nights at 22:00.

== Background ==
The TV series dealt with various social taboos such as teacher-student love, homosexuality, rape, incest, and suicide.

The high school scenes were shot at Japan Christian Junior College. The final scene was shot at Ōmigawa Station on the JR Shin'etsu Main Line, which became a popular pop-culture tourism spot following this series.

In May 1993, a 6-disc laser disc was released. On September 19, 2001, a DVD box set including all episodes and extras was released. On March 20, 2019, a Blu-ray box was released.

=== Theme song ===
Dōji Morita's 1976 song Bokutachi no Shippai was used for the main theme. Typically a popular contemporary song would have been used. Morita was no longer well known anymore, but writer Nojima and producer Itō were fans of her and selected her song as the main theme. The song once again became popular along with the series. The song had previously been out of release but was re-released, as well as appearing on a best album release. Due to this success, later works would use older and often forgotten songs, having a significant effect on theme music.

Five other songs of Morita were used throughout the episodes.

== Cast ==
- Hiroyuki Sanada—Takao Hamura
- Sachiko Sakurai—Mayu Ninomiya
- Hidekazu Akai—Tōru Shinjō
- Masaki Kyomoto—Tomoki Fujimura
- Maki Mochida—Naoko Aizawa
- Emiko Nakamura—Asami Saeki
- Tōru Minegishi—Kōsuke Ninomiya

== Accolades ==
Award	Category	Recipient(s)	Result	Ref.
3rd TV Life Annual Drama Awards	Best Series	High School Teacher	Won	
3rd TV Life Annual Drama Awards	Best Actor	Hiroyuki Sanada	Won	
3rd TV Life Annual Drama Awards	Best Actress	Sachiko Saurai	Won	
3rd TV Life Annual Drama Awards	Best Screenplay	Shinji Nojima	Won	
3rd TV Life Annual Drama Awards	Best Theme Song	Bokutachi no Shippai	Won	

== Sequel ==
A sequel was produced ten years later in 2003, starring Naohito Fujiki and Aya Ueto. Although it was set in the same high school, Masaki Kyomoto was the only cast member to reprise their role from the 1993 version.
