= Michihiro Ikemizu =

Japanese actor, voice actor and narrator

- 池水 通洋
- Born: April 11, 1943 (age 83); Kanagawa Prefecture, Japan
- Education: Waseda University
- Occupations: Actor; voice actor; narrator
- Years active: 1968–present
- Agent: Aoni Production
- Height: 164 cm (5 ft 5 in)

Michihiro Ikemizu (池水 通洋, Ikemizu Michihiro; born April 11, 1943) is a Japanese actor, voice actor and narrator from Kanagawa Prefecture and a graduate of Waseda University who works for Aoni Production.

Among his many roles, he is best known for Hot Springs Emblem (Urusei Yatsura), Isao Ohta (Mobile Police Patlabor) and various Showa era Kamen Rider characters.

In 2022, he won the Merit Award at the 16th Seiyu Awards.

== Filmography ==
=== Film ===
Year	Title	Role	Notes
1978	Farewell to Space Battleship Yamato	Subordinate	Voice only
1984	Urusei Yatsura 2: Beautiful Dreamer	Onsen-Mark	Voice only
1985	Urusei Yatsura 3: Remember My Love	Onsen-Mark	Voice only
1986	Urusei Yatsura 4: Lum the Forever	Onsen-Mark	Voice only
1986	They Were Eleven	Thickhead	Voice only
1988	Urusei Yatsura 5: The Final Chapter	Onsen-Mark	Voice only
1989	Patlabor: The Movie	Isao Ota	Voice only
1991	Urusei Yatsura 6: Always My Darling	Onsen-Mark	Voice only
1993	Patlabor 2: The Movie	Isao Ota	Voice only
2002	WXIII: Patlabor the Movie 3	Isao Ota	Voice only

=== Television ===
Year	Title	Role	Notes
1970-1971	Maco the Mermaid	Prince Harz, Mitsuo, Additional voices	
1971-1973	Kamen Rider	Voices	16 episodes
1974	Judo Sanka	Togama	15 episodes
1974	Kamen Rider Amazon	Snail Beastman	Episode 11 "The Golden Snail's the Reaper's Envoy!?
1975	Kamen Rider Stronger	Armadillon, Armored Knight	5 episodes
1980	Kamen Rider (Skyrider)	Voices	9 episodes
1981	Kamen Rider Super-1	Amaganser	Episode 29 "Rain, Rain, Fall, Fall! The Bizarre Umbrella Man!!"
1982-1986	Urusei Yatsura	Onsen-Mark	80 episodes
1984	Birth of the 10th! Kamen Riders All Together!!	Voices	TV special
1984-1985	Attacker You!	Toshihiko Hazuki	58 episodes
1986-1987	Fist of the North Star	Baruda, Gensho	2 episodes
1987	Dragon Ball	Spike the Devil Man	2 episodes
1987	Fist of the North Star 2	Kane, Soria	2 episodes
1987-1988	Saint Seiya	Crystal	5 episodes
1989	The Jungle Book	Mowgli's Father	Episode 1 "Mowgli Comes to the Jungle"
1989-1990	Patlabor: The TV Series	Isao Ota	47 episodes
1999	Master Keaton	Shinsuke's Father	Episode 19 "Into the Vast Sky..."
2002	Witch Hunter Robin	Takuma Zaizen	2 episodes

=== Dubbing ===
- Rebel Moon (Jimmy (Anthony Hopkins))

== Accolades ==
- Merit Award at the 16th Seiyu Awards (2022)
