= Doji Morita =

Japanese singer-songwriter (1953-2018)

Doji Morita 森田童子
- Born: Minobu Nakanishi (中西美乃生); January 15, 1953
- Origin: Tōkyō, Japan
- Died: April 24, 2018 (aged 65)
- Genres: Chamber folk; psychedelic folk
- Occupations: Singer; songwriter; musician
- Instruments: Cello; guitar
- Years active: 1975–1983
- Labels: Polydor; Atlantic

Doji Morita (森田童子, Morita Dōuji; January 15, 1953 – April 24, 2018) was a Japanese singer-songwriter known for her introspective and sentimental music.

She often explored themes such as loneliness, youthful nostalgia, lost relationships, and the transience of memory and life. Her music features delicate vocals, simple arrangements, and an atmospheric quality that gives her work a subdued and ethereal character.

== Personal life ==
Born Minobu Nakanishi (中西美乃生), Morita came from a complicated family background and was the niece of novelist and songwriter Rei Nakanishi. She spent parts of her youth living with her uncle's family, later choosing to distance herself from her family's public connections. When she began her musical career in the early 1970s, she adopted the stage name Doji Morita, stating that "it comes from 笛吹き童子 (Fuefuki Doji)".

Throughout her performing career, Morita was a secretive and reclusive performer who always wore round sunglasses and grew her curly hair long to hide her identity. She developed a deliberately private persona, keeping details of her personal life almost entirely out of the public eye.

She retired from music in 1983 after marrying her manager, Ado Maeda, and never returned to regular live performance. He died in 2010. Morita died of heart failure eight years later on April 24, 2018, at the age of 65.

== Career ==
Morita began performing in her early twenties. Her first album, 1975's Good Bye, was inspired by a friend's death.

Over the following eight years, she released a small but distinctive body of work, including six studio albums, one live recording album, and four singles. All of her subsequent albums, such as Mother Sky and The Last Waltz, also explored tragic or melancholic themes.

In 1993, her song "Bokutachi no Shippai" was used as the theme song for the TV drama Kōkō Kyōshi. This led to a revival of interest in her work and the release of a greatest hits album.

== Discography ==
=== Studio albums ===
Title	Details	Tracklist
Good Bye グットバイ	Released: 1975; Label: Polydor	1. 早春にて (In Early Spring); 2. 君は変わっちゃったネ (You Have Changed); 3. まぶしい夏 (Dazzling Summer); 4. 雨のクロール (Rainy Crawl); 5. 地平線 (Horizon); 6. センチメンタル通り (Sentimental Street); 7. 淋しい雲 (Lonely Clouds); 8. たんごの節句 (Tango no sekku The Boys' Festival); 9. 驟雨（にわかあめ）(A Brief Shower); 10. さよならぼくのともだち (Good Bye My Friend)
Mother Sky マザー・スカイ=きみは悲しみの青い空をひとりで飛べるか=	Released: 1976; Label: Polydor	1. ぼくたちの失敗 (Our Mistake); 2. ぼくと観光バスに乗ってみませんか (Will You Ride the Sightseeing Bus With Me); 3. 伝書鳩 (Carrier Pigeon); 4. 逆光線 (Back Light); 5. ピラビタール (Pirabital Mesmerism medicinel); 6. 海を見たいと思った (I Wanted to See the Ocean, I Thought); 7. 男のくせに泣いてくれた (Though a Man, He Wept For Me); 8. ニューヨークからの手紙 (Letter from NY); 9. 春爛漫 (Best Spring); 10. 今日は奇蹟の朝です (Today, Morning of Miracles)
A Boy ア・ボーイ	Released: 1977; Label: Polydor	1. 蒼き夜は(Blue Night); 2. 君と淋しい風になる (With You I Become a Lonely Wind); 3. ふるえているネ (You're Trembling); 4. ぼくを見かけませんでしたか (Didn't You See Me?); 5. セルロイドの少女 (Celluloid Girl); 6. 淋しい素描 (A Lonely Rough Sketch); 7. ぼくが君の思い出になってあげよう (I Will Be a Memory For You); 8. G線上にひとり (In G Line); 9. 終曲のために第3番 「友への手紙」 (No. 3 for Finale ' Letter for my friend')
The Last Waltz ラスト・ワルツ	Released: 1980; Label: Atlantic	1. 赤いダウンパーカーぼくのともだち (My Friend in the Red Down Parka); 2. 菜の花あかり(Rape Blossom Light); 3. 海が死んでもいいョって鳴いている (The Sea Says I May Die); 4. グリーン大佐答えて下さい (Please Answer, Colonel Green); 5. みんな夢でありました (It Was All a Dream); 6. きれいに咲いた (It Blossomed Beautifully); 7. たとえばぼくが死んだら (If I Should Die); 8. ラスト・ワルツ (Last Waltz)
Nocturne 夜想曲（やそうきょく）	Released: 1982; Label: Atlantic	1. 蒸留反応; 2. 淋しい猫 (Lonely Cat); 3. ぼくは16角形; 4. 麗子像 (Image of a Fawn); 5. サナトリウム (Sanatorium); 6. 船がくるぞ (The Ship Is Coming); 7. 孤立無援の唄; 8. 哀悼夜曲; 9. ラスト・ワルツ/『ラスト・ワルツ』(1980年、5th）収録の同一曲とバックのトラックは一緒で、ヴォーカルが再録音。 (Last Waltz)
Wolf Boy 狼少年	Released: 1983; Label: Atlantic	1. 愛情練習（ロシアン・ルーレット） (Practice of love 'Russian Roulette'); 2. ぼくを見つけてくれないかなァ (Can't you find me?); 3. ぼくは流星になる (I become a shooting star); 4. 151680時間の夢 (151680 Hour Dream); 5. 球根栽培の唄（ときわ荘にて録音）(Song Of Bulb Cultivation); 6. ぼくのせいですか (Is It Because of Me?); 7. 憂鬱デス (Melancholy); 8. 狼少年・ウルフボーイ (Wolf Boy)

=== Live albums ===
Title	Details	Tracklist
Tokyo Cathedral Saint Mary Live 東京カテドラル聖マリア大聖堂録音盤	Released: 1978; Label: Polydor; Venue: St. Mary's Cathedral, Tokyo	1. 地平線 (Horizon); 2. 逆光線 (Back Light); 3. 君は変わっちゃったネ (You Have Changed); 4. 雨のクロール (Rainy Crawl); 5. ぼくと観光バスに乗ってみませんか (Will You Ride the Sightseeing Bus With Me); 6. 友よ泣かないのか (Friend, Won't You Cry?); 7. 海を見たいと思った (I Wanted to See the Ocean, I Thought); 8. センチメンタル通り (Sentimental Street); 9. さよならぼくのともだち (Good Bye My Friend); 10. 風さわぐ原地の中に (In the Wind-Swept Wilderness)

=== Singles ===
Title	Details	A-side / B-side
さよならぼくのともだち / まぶしい夏	Released: 1975; Label: Polydor	さよならぼくのともだち (Goodbye, My Friend) / まぶしい夏 (Dazzling Summer)
ぼくたちの失敗 / ぼくと観光バスに乗ってみませんか	Released: 1976; Label: Polydor	ぼくたちの失敗 (Our Failure) / ぼくと観光バスに乗ってみませんか (Will You Ride the Sightseeing Bus With Me)
セルロイドの少女 / 蒼き夜は	Released: 1978; Label: Polydor	セルロイドの少女 (The Celluloid Girl) / 蒼き夜は (Blue Night)
ラスト・ワルツ / 菜の花あかり	Released: 1981; Label: Atlantic	ラスト・ワルツ (Last Waltz) / 菜の花あかり (Rape Blossom Light)

=== Compilations ===
Title	Details	Tracklist
Bokutachi no Shippai – Morita Doji Best Collection ぼくたちの失敗 森田童子ベスト・コレクション	Released: 1993; Label: Warner Music Japan	1. ぼくたちの失敗 (Our Mistake); 2. 蒼き夜は (Blue Night); 3. 雨のクロール (Rainy Crawl); 4. 蒸留反応; 5. 哀悼夜曲; 6. 孤立無援の唄; 7. さよならぼくのともだち (Good Bye My Friend) (Live); 8. 逆光線 (Back Light); 9. サナトリウム (Sanatorium); 10. 男のくせに泣いてくれた (Though a Man, He Wept For Me); 11. 春爛漫 (Best Spring); 12. G線上にひとり (In G Line); 13. ラスト・ワルツ (Last Waltz)
Bokutachi no Shippai – Morita Doji Best Collection ぼくたちの失敗 森田童子ベストコレクション	Released: 2003; Label: Toshiba-EMI	1. ぼくたちの失敗 (Our Mistake); 2. 雨のクロール (Rainy Crawl); 3. 淋しい雲 (Lonely Clouds); 4. ぼくと観光バスに乗ってみませんか (Will You Ride the Sightseeing Bus With Me); 5. 君と淋しい風になる (With You I Become a Lonely Wind); 6. ふるえているネ (You're Trembling); 7. ぼくが君の思い出になってあげよう (I Will Be a Memory For You); 8. G線上にひとり (In G Line); 9. 赤いダウンパーカーぼくのともだち (My Friend in the Red Down Parka); 10. みんな夢でありました (It Was All a Dream); 11. たとえばぼくが死んだら (If I Should Die); 12. ラスト・ワルツ (Last Waltz); 13. 蒸留反応; 14. ぼくは16角形; 15. 孤立無援の唄; 16. ひとり遊び
