= Rina Uchiyama =

Japanese actress and idol (born 1981)

- 内山 理名
- Born: November 7, 1981 (age 44); Minamiashigara, Kanagawa, Japan
- Occupation: Actress
- Years active: 1998—present
- Spouse: Eisaku Yoshida (m. 2021)
- Children: 1
- Website: rinauchiyama.com

Rina Uchiyama (内山 理名, Uchiyama Rina; born November 7, 1981) is a Japanese actress and idol.

== Career ==
Uchiyama was first discovered in her hometown in Kanagawa Prefecture by the talent agency Sweet Power at the age of 15. She was signed up by the agency, and in 1998, moved to Tokyo to launch her career in the entertainment industry.

Uchiyama left Sweet Power in March 2024, and switched to her husband private agency, Dhuta.

== Personal life ==
On November 21, 2021, Uchiyama announced that she is married to actor Eisaku Yoshida.

On September 10, 2025, she gave birth to her first child.

== Filmography ==
=== Film ===
- Utukushii Hito (1999)
- Go-Con! Japanese Love Culture (2000) as Jun
- Satorare (2001)
- Sotsugyo (2002)
- Shinku (The Deep Red) (2005) as Kanako Akiba
- Nobuhiro-san (2005)
- Tooku no Sora (2010) as Mie Matsuki
- Kyoryu o horo! (2013) as Sachiko Matsumoto
- Kakekomi (2015)
- Yurari (2017)
- The Bonds of Clay (2021)

=== Television ===
- Nanisama (TBS, 1998) as Mizuki
- Suzuran (NHK, 1999)
- LxIxVxE (TBS, 1999) as Matsubara Chieas
- Utsukushii hito (TBS, 1999)
- Bus Stop (Fuji TV, 2000) as Miyamae Matsuri
- Hensyuo (Fuji TV, 2000)
- Strawberry on the Shortcake (SOS) (TBS, 2001) as Sawamura Haruka
- Rookie! (Fuji TV, 2001) as Sato Kaori
- Handoku (TBS, 2001) as Kojima Michiko
- Yonimo Kimyona Monogatari (Mushi game) (Fuji TV, 2002)
- Wedding Planner (Fuji TV, 2002, ep4) as Fujinami Chizuru
- Good Luck!! (TBS, 2003) as Fukaura Urara
- Moto Kare (TBS, 2003) as Hayakawa Nao
- Musashi (NHK, 2003) as Akemi
- Higuchi Ichiyo Monogatari (TBS, 2004) as Higuchi Ichiyo
- Fire Boys (Fuji TV, 2004) as Sonoda Mahiru
- Koi no Kara Sawagi Drama Special (Love Stories) (NTV, 2004)
- Hoshino Senichi Monogatari (TBS, 2005)
- Rikon Bengoshi 2 (Fuji TV, 2005, ep1)
- Oku: Hana no Ran (Fuji TV, 2005) as Yasuko
- Earthquake (NTV, 2006)
- Message (MBS, 2006)
- Bokutachi no Senso (TBS, 2006)
- Yonimo Kimyona Monogatari (Neko ga Ongaeshi) (Fuji TV)
- Kiraware Matsuko no Issho (TBS, 2006) as Kawajiri Matsuko
- Seito Shokun! (TV Asahi, 2007) as Hokujo Shoko
- Kodoku no Utagoe (Wowow, 2007)
- Ten to Sen (TV Asahi, 2007)
- Yagyu Ichizoku no Inbo (TV Asahi, 2008)
- Daibutsu Kaigen (NHK, 2010)
- Brutus no Shinzo (Fuji TV, 2011)
- Toshi Densetsu no Onna (TV Asahi, 2012, ep1)
- |Utamaro's Mashie (TV Asahi, 2012)
- Sosa Chizu no Onna (TV Asahi, 2012)
- Honey Trap (Fuji TV, 2013) as Kaoru Nakagawa
- Joyu Reiko Honoo no Youni (TV Tokyo, 2013) as Reiko Ohara

== Awards and nominations ==
Year	Award	Category	Work(s)	Result	Ref.
2006	30th Elan d'or Awards	Newcomer of the Year	Herself	Won	
