= Japanese television drama =

Television drama programs on Japanese television

Japanese television drama (テレビドラマ, terebi dorama; television drama), also called dorama (ドラマ) or J-drama, are television programs that are a staple of Japanese television and are broadcast daily.

== Format ==
All major TV networks in Japan produce a variety of drama series including romance, comedy, detective stories, horror, jidaigeki, thriller, BL, and many others. Single episode, or "tanpatsu" dramas that are usually two hours in length are also broadcast. For special occasions, there may be a one or two-episode drama with a specific theme, such as one produced in 2015 for the 70-year anniversary of the end of World War II.

Japanese drama series are broadcast in three-month seasons: winter (January–March), spring (April–June), summer (July–September), and autumn (October–December). Some series may start in another month though it may still be counted as a series of a specific season. Most of the dramas air on weekday evenings between 9pm and 11pm. Daytime dramas are typically broadcast daily, and episodes of the same drama can be aired daily for several months, such as NHK's asadora, which usually span six months each. Evening dramas air weekly and are usually ten to fourteen hour-long episodes.

In many cases, instead of being episodic, drama series are serial, with one story running throughout the episodes. The length of these dramas allows them to explore characters, situations, and interesting dialog in a way that is less possible in most movies. Structurally, Japanese dramas can be compared to American or British miniseries. Dramas are rarely canceled mid-season, but even the extremely popular usually do not continue into the next season. Popular dramas do, however, often give rise to "specials" that are made after the final episode if the show has been a huge success. Some genres such as jidaigeki, police procedurals, or family dramas, however, feature series that are episodic or that sometimes continue for years on end, with Mito Kōmon, Taiyō ni Hoero!, or Wataru Seken wa Oni Bakari being famous examples.

A characteristic of Japanese drama that differentiates it is that each episode is usually shot only a few (two to three) weeks before it is aired. Many fans have even been able to visit their idols while shooting scenes as the show is airing.

== History ==
1940s "The Beginning"

In 1940, NHK conducted experimental broadcasts and aired a 12-minute television drama titled Yuugemae (夕餉前). This is considered the first television drama in Japan.

1950s–1960s "The Early Years"

During the 1950s, private television stations such as Nippon Television, TBS, TV Asahi, and Fuji Television were launched, and each began producing television dramas. At the time, however, television dramas were regarded as inferior to movies and theater, and top actors hesitated to appear in them. Amid this trend, NHK established the Taiga drama slot and successfully cast Keiji Sada, a major movie star, paving the way for other movie stars to transition to television.

1970s–1990s "The Golden Age"

By the time of the 1964 Tokyo Olympics, television ownership in Japan had surpassed 90%. As movies declined, television dramas entered their golden age. The 1970s saw the emergence of talented scriptwriters such as Kuniko Mukoda, Taichi Yamada, So Kuramoto, and Shinichi Ichikawa. In the 1980s, NHK's Asadora series Oshin (1983) recorded a peak rating of 62.9%, while the Taiga drama Dokuganryu Masamune (1987) achieved an average rating of 39.7%. In commercial broadcasting, series with flashy action, such as Taiyō ni Hoero! (1972), Tokusō Saizensen (1977) and Seibu Keisatsu (1979), became popular. From the late 1980s to the 1990s, "trendy dramas" gained widespread popularity. This period also saw the emergence of talented screenwriters like Yuji Sakamoto, Eriko Kitagawa, Shinji Nojima, Koki Mitani and Yoshikazu Okada, as well as new stars such as Yuji Oda, Yosuke Eguchi, and Takuya Kimura.

2000s "A Turning Point"

Japanese television dramas continued to enjoy success in the 2000s. The Fuji TV series Hero (2001) achieved an average viewership rating of 34.3%, reaffirming Takuya Kimura's immense popularity. However, during this period, the internet began to spread widely and emerged as a potential rival to television.

2010s "The Rise of Streaming"

The rise of streaming platforms, led by American companies like Netflix, became increasingly evident, while traditional Japanese television dramas experienced declining viewership ratings. This created a vicious cycle of shrinking production budgets. Amid this downturn, TBS delivered a series of hits such as Naoki Hanzawa (2013), solidifying the "Sunday Theater" (日曜劇場) slot as the pinnacle of commercial TV dramas.

2020s "The Streaming Era"

Streaming dramas, backed by generous budgets from foreign companies, came to be seen as far more lavish than traditional Japanese dramas. Alice in Borderland (2020), Sanctuary (2023), and Tokyo Swindlers (2024) are emblematic examples of this trend. TBS's "Sunday Theater," renowned for its success with Naoki Hanzawa (2013), sought to counter this trend by producing Vivant (2023) with an unprecedented budget. However, reports indicate that the show failed to break even, ultimately running at a loss.

== Trendy dramas ==
Most people associate today's Japanese dramas with the modern style of screenwriting which has coined the term "trendy dramas". The ultimate inspirations for many Japanese dramas are The Big Chill (1983) and St. Elmo's Fire (1985). The "trendy" formula was invented in the late 1980s when screenwriters decided to reach the television audience with themes that covered real-life Japan, at a time when the Japanese were experiencing a bubble economy. The "trendy" formula was improved in the early 1990s, when the story lines changed with the times. By gambling on harder issues, including teenage violence, child abuse, and modern family life, the trendy drama formula is tweaked to fit the television viewers' changing taste. Even today, the success of Japanese dramas is a result of sticking with the trendy drama formula. Many of these shows employ young actors who use them as springboards to bigger projects.

Although some people consider Super Sentai and tokusatsu type shows as dramas, they do not fit the "trendy" definition. Generally, most evening dramas aired nowadays are "trendy dramas", and the term does not apply to other types of dramas such as asadora.

== Difference in focus between networks ==
Dramas that are broadcast on Fuji Television (Fuji TV), NTV, and TBS are generally the most popular in any given season.

Fuji TV is widely known as the inventor of the drama formula. During the 1980s and 1990s, Fuji TV popularized trendy dramas with their use of young and popular actors/actresses. The network's 9:00 p.m. dramas shown on Monday nights are commonly called "Getsuku" (a shortened phrase meaning Monday at 9), which historically have revolved around love stories. Although a popular time slot in the past in which dramas generally brought in high ratings during the season, the popularity of "Getsuku" dramas appears to have declined in recent years, with most dramas not crossing the 20% mark for average rating. Most modern "Getsuku" dramas have also abandoned the traditional love story format.

Other Japan television networks have their own focuses. TV Asahi, for example, focuses heavily on jidaigeki and crime stories (famous examples of the latter are the long-running series Tokyo Detective Duo, now on its 23rd season. Kasouken no Onna, now on its 24th season). NHK puts more effort into programming that reaches an older demographic, focusing mostly on epic period shows of historical significance, often with all-star casts, called taiga dramas, as well as inspiring dramas that focus on a young, strong-willed hero or heroine.

== Theme music and background music ==
Theme music and background music set the overall tone of Japanese drama series. Most dramas will start off with one or two minutes of theme music during the opening credits. Other dramas will have, at the very least, a catchy melody in the beginning, displaying the show's name for a few seconds, and then one to two minutes of ending theme music during the closing credits. Background music is placed and used at strategic points of the episode to set the mood.

There is a sub-genre of Japanese drama fans that are also huge fans of the drama's original soundtrack. Most television networks work with music companies to produce original soundtracks. Most opening and closing theme music is written especially for the drama series, while other theme music is licensed from other sources. Once the library is put together, the television network will release the original soundtrack compact disc, usually a few weeks after the start of the drama. Closing themes are often sung by a popular J-pop singer or band.

NHK produces its own theme music and is one of the only Japanese television networks that has its own orchestra. Most of the theme music heard in their taiga and asadora dramas were written and produced in-house.

In recent years, many theme songs have been licensed from sources outside Japan. In some instances, theme songs have been licensed from some of the biggest names in the Western recording industry. This practice has disadvantages. When the Japanese drama is licensed outside Japan, theme music licensing becomes very costly. For example, in the Fuji TV drama Densha Otoko, the opening song and some of the background music had to be replaced in the release that aired on Hawaii's Nippon Golden Network because they couldn't get the rights to them.

== Importance of ratings ==
A survey completed in 2000 by NHK, Japan's public broadcasting network, showed that 95% of Japanese people watched television every day. Eighty-six percent said they considered television an indispensable medium, and 68% said the same of newspapers. Most television networks, such as Fuji TV (CX) where operates Fuji Network System, also have online streaming websites. However, Shinji Takada, a television executive at Nippon Television (NTV), stated in 2003 that although the Internet is popular among drama fans, "We don't regard broadband as mainstream media. It will never happen. Broadband is a complementary medium."

Television ratings are calculated by several researching firms. Video Research Ltd. is one of the more reliable firms. More television networks, advertisers, and Japanese drama fans use the numbers from this firm than any other. The ratings focus on the Kanto (Tokyo) and the Kansai (Osaka) areas, which are believed to be a good representation of what most of Japan watches. The ratings become available for the general public every Wednesday.

=== Rating system ===
The rating system is very simple. All the major Japanese television networks make up the television market, so a research firm must determine the size of an average audience. The audience size is determined using two factors: the amount of content that is transmitted and the amount that is received, as market size varies from firm to firm. The viewer count of a given episode is calculated using a variety of polling methods. Ratings are calculated using a percentage or point system. This is based on the episode's viewership numbers divided by the market size. Finally, the numbers are published on the research firm's website. A hard copy is also produced.

There is no solid science on how to interpret these rating percentages. For fans, simply the drama with the highest percentage is the "winner" for the week. The fans use these numbers to decide which dramas they should watch during the remainder of the season. Despite this simple interpretation, there are one or more factors that may come into play that explain why some dramas receive higher percentage points than others. For example, evening dramas draw better ratings than those that air in the mornings and afternoons. Although the transmission size is virtually the same in the mornings, afternoons and evenings, the evenings draw higher numbers because most evening viewers work during the day, and fewer people are at home watching television. There are, however, some exceptions: For example, the NHK Asadora drama Oshin drew an average rating percentage of 52.6%, a number that would be extremely good for an evening drama but even more extraordinary for a drama that airs in the mornings and six days a week.

Finally, rating percentage plays a heavy role in the success of a drama artist. The numbers of an artist's previous work are used by TV producers to determine whether or not the artist is a marketing success. If the ratings drawn by the artist's previous work are good, they would be able to receive offers to star in dramas that are better written and produced. Likewise if the ratings drawn by the artist's previous work are good, some artist could build their career as acting singer.

=== Formula for good ratings ===
In evening dramas, cast members are carefully selected and tend to be famous actors that audiences are very fond of. The choice of cast members frequently affects the drama's audience rating, and pairing the right male and female artists is especially important in a renzoku ren'ai (romantic or love) drama. Cast members of morning and afternoon dramas are not as popular as those of evening dramas, as reflected by ratings, but with time good actors can gain popularity.

== Use of the term "dorama" ==
"Dorama" (ドラマ) is a general term used in Japan to refer to drama series and soap operas, regardless of the country where they were filmed or produced. In the Western world, the word "dorama" was initially used to refer exclusively to Japanese television dramas, however in recent years it has become a general term used to refer to all Asian television dramas and series due to the international rise of Korean and Chinese dramas.
