= To Your Eternity season 3 =

Season of television series

To Your Eternity
- Season 3
- Key visual for the season
- No. of episodes: 22

Release
- Original network: NHK General TV
- Original release: October 4, 2025 – March 28, 2026

Season chronology
- ← Previous; Season 2

The third season of the anime television series To Your Eternity was announced in the final episode of the second season in March 2023. Studio Massket joins Drive for production animation, with Sōta Yokote directing the season, and Kiyoko Sayama returning from the second season as chief director, alongside the rest of the staff and cast reprising their roles. The season aired from October 4, 2025, to March 28, 2026, on NHK General TV, and ran for 22 episodes.

Crunchyroll licensed the series for streaming outside of Asia, and also streams the English dub on the same day. The opening theme song is "Fumetsu no Anata" (ふめつのあなた; lit. 'Your Eternity'), performed by Perfume, while the ending theme song is "Recollections", composed by Masashi Hamauzu.

== Episodes ==
| No. overall | No. in season | Title | Directed by (Note: Production staff information is taken from the ending credits of each episode.) | Storyboarded by | Original release date |
|---|---|---|---|---|---|
| 41 | 1 | "Peaceful World"; Transliteration: "Odayakanaru Yo" (Japanese: 最後のひとり) | Sōta Yokote | Kiyoko Sayama | October 4, 2025 |
Fushi wakes up in modern times and is fascinated by society's evolution. However, upon seeing that his mother figure March was already adopted by a family, Fushi decides to avoid seeing her. He meets several school students fascinated by his powers and allow him to stay at their home. Fushi releases his late friends to reunite with him. As they play together, Fushi meets a young high school student similar to the hunters from the previous civilization that were obsessed with him.
| 42 | 2 | "A Knot in the Soul"; Transliteration: "Kokoro no Musubi-me" (Japanese: こころのむすびめ) | Pei Ni Hong | Kiyoko Sayama | October 11, 2025 |
Fushi casually greets the high school student but ignores her lineage. He is instead shocked more by how technology allows him to reunite with the rest of all of his reborn friends and thus Fushi creates copies of houses so that they can live together with March returning too. Meanwhile, the descendant of the hunters is depressed about the idea of living her school and a close friend.
| 43 | 3 | "Mizuha"; Transliteration: "Mizuha" (Japanese: みずは) | Marina Maki | Kiyoko Sayama | October 18, 2025 |
Mizuha is attacked by a Nokker but is saved by a disguised Fushi. Upon returning home, Mizuha is told by her mother about her hatred towards her grandfather but makes her happy when telling they are not gonna move. Mizuha then explains her desire for perfection in life enough to be immortal. Her grandfather convinces her to join his cult as he tells her predecessors have always aimed to capture the immortal being, Fushi. When returning home, Mizuha is shocked to find herself with a knife and her mother dead. She runs in horror until being spotted by Fushi.
| 44 | 4 | "The One Who Vanished"; Transliteration: "Inaku Natta Hito" (Japanese: いなくなったひと) | Naoki Horiuchi | Kiyoko Sayama | October 25, 2025 |
It is revealed Fushi saw Mizuha's mother's dead body, and tries to help the daughter as she claims she has no recollections of murdering her. In the next day, Mizuha finds that her mother is still alive much to her confusion. Meanwhile, Fushi and his friends try to get used to modern times by having identity cards and means to either get an education or a job. Upon hearing the mother survived, Fushi seeks wisdom from his creator, the Beholder, in regards to about the apparent revival that he saw, but the Beholder does not appear. After inviting Mizuha to his house, Fushi is told by Bon he can see the soul of Mizuha's mother in the house.
| 45 | 5 | "Unheard Words"; Transliteration: "Todokanu Kotoba" (Japanese: とどかぬことば) | Ken Sanuma | Hidetoshi Yoshida | November 1, 2025 |
After being told by Mizuha's mother not to tell the truth about the present one being a fake likely caused by a Nokker, Fushi and his friends start an education in a school. Fushi and his friends have fun at school interacting with several students, but the former does not understand why other classmates flirt with him. While looking after Mizuha, Fushi is asked about the concept of romantic relationships that lead to marriages but Fushi does not find it interesting since he would always outlive the person he loves. Later, Tonari asks Fushi about why he revived them in the modern world, jealous of Mizuha's advances, but Fushi instead claims the modern times are the perfect one they can live in.
| 46 | 6 | "Proof of Peace"; Transliteration: "Heiwa no Shōmei" (Japanese: へいわのしょうめい) | Tadashi Nakamura | Kiyoko Sayama | November 8, 2025 |
After failing to defeat another Nokker taking the form of a human, Fushi and Bon meet the Beholder, who is aiming to become a normal human. This confuses Fushi about what it means to be human and whether or not he actually loves others or simply wants to take advantage of them. As he wonders about it, Fushi transforms into a turtle and swims in the sea until dropping several eggs. He is found by Mizuha who offers him to explain what love is when learning the immortal is confused about it.
| 47 | 7 | "The Attack"; Transliteration: "Shūgeki" (Japanese: しゅうげき) | Hiroyuki Takeuchi | Kiyoko Sayama | November 15, 2025 |
| 48 | 8 | "Trouble"; Transliteration: "Yakkai-goto" (Japanese: やっかいごと) | Michita Shiroishi | Kiyoko Sayama | November 22, 2025 |
| 49 | 9 | "Rejected Life"; Transliteration: "Kobamu Inochi" (Japanese: こばむいのち) | Marina Maki | Kiyoko Sayama | November 29, 2025 |
| 50 | 10 | "Become as People"; Transliteration: "Hito no Furi" (Japanese: ひとのふり) | Ken Sanuma | Ken Sanuma | December 6, 2025 |
| 51 | 11 | "Their Home"; Transliteration: "Kare ra no Ie" (Japanese: かれらのいえ) | Hiroyuki Takeuchi | Kiyoko Sayama | December 13, 2025 |
| 52 | 12 | "Flying Bug"; Transliteration: "Tobu Mushi" (Japanese: とぶむし) | Tadashi Nakamura | Kiyoko Sayama | December 20, 2025 |
| 53 | 13 | "Number One"; Transliteration: "Ichiban" (Japanese: いちばん) | Utsugi Toshima & Dandan Yu | Kiyoko Sayama | January 10, 2026 (Note: While airing its premiere on NHK General TV on December 27, 2025, episode 53 was halted due to a coverage of an earthquake. It reaired in its complete format on January 10, 2026.) |
| 54 | 14 | "Where One Belongs"; Transliteration: "Irubeki Basho" (Japanese: いるべきばしょ) | Marina Maki | Kiyoko Sayama | January 17, 2026 |
| 55 | 15 | "Leaving Alone"; Transliteration: "Hitorida Chi" (Japanese: ひとりだち) | Kiyoko Sayama | Kiyoko Sayama | January 24, 2026 |
| 56 | 16 | "Connective"; Transliteration: "Tsunagu Mono" (Japanese: つなぐもの) | Shinichi Tabe | Kiyoko Sayama | January 31, 2026 |
| 57 | 17 | "Invisible Battle"; Transliteration: "Mienu Tatakai" (Japanese: みえぬたたかい) | Sayaka Niwa | Kiyoko Sayama | February 28, 2026 (Note: Episode 57 was delayed by three weeks due to NHK's coverage of the 2026 Winter Olympics.) |
| 58 | 18 | "A Willingness to Believe"; Transliteration: "Shinjiru Kokoro" (Japanese: しんじるこころ) | Sōta Yokote | Kiyoko Sayama & Akira Oguro | March 7, 2026 |
| 59 | 19 | "Clean Water"; Transliteration: "Kireina Mizu" (Japanese: きれいなみず) | Marina Maki | Kiyoko Sayama | March 14, 2026 |
| 60 | 20 | "Coexist"; Transliteration: "Kyōzon" (Japanese: きょうぞん) | Marina Maki | Kiyoko Sayama | March 21, 2026 |
| 61 | 21 | "Stay Here"; Transliteration: "Kono Mama Koko de" (Japanese: このままここで) | Michita Shiraishi | Kiyoko Sayama | March 28, 2026 |
| 62 | 22 | "To Fushi"; Transliteration: "Fushi e" (Japanese: フシへ) | Kiyoko Sayama | Kiyoko Sayama | March 28, 2026 |
