= To Your Eternity season 2 =

Season of television series

To Your Eternity
- Season 2
- Key visual of the season
- No. of episodes: 20

Release
- Original network: NHK Educational TV
- Original release: October 23, 2022 – March 12, 2023

Season chronology
- ← Previous; Season 1 Next → Season 3

The second season of the anime television series To Your Eternity was announced in the final episode of the first season in August 2021. The plot continues the immortal being Fushi as he encounters mankind after decades of self-exile. The series is based on Yoshitoki Oima's manga series with the same name.

Drive replaced Brain's Base in animating the second season, while Kiyoko Sayama replaced Masahiko Murata as the director. The rest of the main staff from the first season reprised their roles, including Shinzō Fujita as series script supervisor, Koji Yabuno as character designer, Ryo Kawasaki as music composer, and Takeshi Takadera as sound director. The season aired from October 23, 2022, to March 12, 2023, and ran for 20 episodes. Like with the first season, Crunchyroll is also streaming the second season.

The second season's opening theme song is "Pink Blood", performed by Hikaru Utada, reused with updated visuals in the opening credits to represent the new story arcs, while the ending theme song is "Roots", composed by Masashi Hamauzu.

== Episodes ==
| No. overall | No. in season | Title | Directed by | Original release date |
|---|---|---|---|---|
| 21 | 1 | "Infatuation Reborn"; Transliteration: "Tensei Suru Aishū" (Japanese: 転生する愛執) | Shōta Hamada | October 23, 2022 |
Fushi has been living with on Sarine Island for the last four decades, fighting Nokkers on his own while refusing to return to society. As he prepares to leave, he meets Hisame, the nine-year-old granddaughter and very first reincarnation of Hayase's restless spirit and equally twisted, strong will to be with Fushi for all eternity. Hisame's left arm contains the Nokker which had merged with Hayase. When travelling with Hisame, Fushi learns from a doctor that Nokkers started attacking villagers.
| 22 | 2 | "Beating Will"; Transliteration: "Kodō Suru Yuigon" (Japanese: 鼓動する遺言) | Takahiro Tanaka | October 30, 2022 |
Fushi expresses grief as the middle-aged Tonari is about to die and grants her last will while showing all the people he met across his journey and became able to turn into. Following his friend's death, Fushi meets Hisame again who expresses her single desire of having a child with him. As both do not understand the proper idea of how humans are born, they two simply share a night together. As time moves on, Fushi meets Hisame's child who clarifies that he is not her late father. Fushi then starts living alone and is often visited by more of Hayase's female great-great-great granddaughters/reincarnations as the decades go by.
| 23 | 3 | "The Awaited"; Transliteration: "Machinozoma Reta Eiyū" (Japanese: 待ち望まれた者) | Masahiko Watanabe | November 6, 2022 |
Fushi befriends the only successor of Hayase's obsessively twisted will and great-great-great-great-great grandson/male reincarnation, Kahaku, who explains that there is a village known as the Guardian Force Unit, worshiping Fushi and opposing the Nokkers per the will of their maternal great-great-great-great-grandmother. Fushi and Kahaku also meet Bonchien Nicoli la Tasty Peach Uralis, the Prince of the Uralis Kingdom who aims to become the next king and is attracted to Fushi's mysterious otherworldly abilities, too, who has remained in the late Parona's agile form at the request of Kahaku earlier.
| 24 | 4 | "The Young Man Who Can See"; Transliteration: "Mieru Seinen" (Japanese: 視える青年) | Toshiyuki Sone | November 13, 2022 |
Still in Parona's form, Fushi is uneasy about the impact will have on the people of Uralis, especially when the skeptical Church of Bennett arrival with the claim that he is a demon who serves under the Devil. Meanwhile, Prince Bonichen's harsh and troubled boyhood is revealed; how his own mother had him tortured and exorcised as she believed that his rare ability to see and hear the spirits of the deceased was from demonic possession. As he grew, Prince Bonichen was visited by the spirit of Tonari Dalton who gave him the hope and guidance to endure and believe in the existence of "the White-Haired Immortal One."
| 25 | 5 | "The Holy Man's Voyage"; Transliteration: "Seija no Ensei" (Japanese: 聖者の遠征) | Shōta Hamada | November 20, 2022 |
In the elderly form of his lifelong friend Booze Man, Fushi begins to overawe the Uralis people with his miracles. While trying and failing to save a man's ailing daughter, Prince Bonichen discovers a shocking and wondrous truth, but decides not to tell Fushi.
| 26 | 6 | "Heretics Betrayed"; Transliteration: "Itan no To" (Japanese: 異端の徒) | Yoshihisa Matsumoto | November 27, 2022 |
Fushi in Parona's form politely rejects Kahaku's confession. Misinterpreting his answer for naivety he still embraces Fushi, who gets a strong visceral reaction. He realizes and explains to him that while he may not find Kahaku to be a bad person, the body he's inhabiting may feel differently, recounting his ancestor Hayase's cruelty in detail. Prince Bonchien eventually agrees to hand over Fushi to the Church of Bennett in exchange for a recommendation to be made king. Todo, Kahaku and the town's people oppose him and the Church, demanding proof. Fushi willingly fails a test to revive a deceased priest after the Church suggests they'll refrain from further pursuing Bonchien. Todo is struck down and a distraught Bonchien is captured regardless. Fushi is left inside an airtight iron cage, and Todo and Bonchien are left in hanging contiguous cells over a canyon.
| 27 | 7 | "Crime and Forgiveness"; Transliteration: "Batsu to Yurushi" (Japanese: 罰とゆるし) | Takahiro Tanaka | December 4, 2022 |
Fushi's iron cage is filled with molten iron. The townspeople are divided about Fushi and the Church. Because Prince Bonchien refuses to denounce Fushi he is put on trial for heresy. Bon's spirit friends remain by Bon's side, along with a child imprisoned for stealing bread. In the time spent there Bon realizes he had no real reason for wanting to become king. Meanwhile, Fushi manages to produce molten iron and pretends to remain imprisoned while flying away to rescue Bon and Todo. Bon decides to remain in his cage, saying he'll be exonerated if he declares against Fushi. However, he had already decided to place himself as the villain to appease the Church and stop its persecution of his friends, family and Fushi. The Church prepares his execution.
| 28 | 8 | "Beyond Dreams"; Transliteration: "Yume no Saki" (Japanese: 夢の先) | Masahiko Watanabe | December 11, 2022 |
Everyone witnessing Prince Bonchien's execution mysteriously falls asleep. Cylira, head priest of the Church, wakes up and rejoices to find Bon's lifeless corpse. Bon wakes up believing he's dead and sees his family and the townspeople mourning him. Fushi reveals how he managed to save him using Tonari's notebook. Bon reunites with his family and takes a new identity. He meets with Iris, finally recognizing Toto as his childhood friend. While preparing to depart, Fushi feels someone's pain. Feeling he'd failed at everything, Kahaku had tried to remove the nokker in his arm. The nokker communicates with the group through writing, revealing the reason behind their attacks and also their next target: the Church of Bennet. Bon and then Fushi tell a surprised Kahaku he and the Guardians are still needed. Fushi resolves to fight and heads towards the Church.
| 29 | 9 | "Expanding Consciousness"; Transliteration: "Hirogaru Ishiki" (Japanese: 拡がる意識) | Shunji Yoshida | December 18, 2022 |
| 30 | 10 | "Resonance"; Transliteration: "Kyōmei" (Japanese: 共鳴) | Matsuo Asami | December 25, 2022 |
| 31 | 11 | "The Value of Flesh"; Transliteration: "Niku no Kachi" (Japanese: 肉の価値) | Masahiko Watanabe | January 8, 2023 |
| 32 | 12 | "Secret Behind the Veil"; Transliteration: "Bēru ga Himeru Mono" (Japanese: ベールが秘めるもの) | Kiyoko Sayama | January 15, 2023 |
| 33 | 13 | "The Wise Man's Identity"; Transliteration: "Kenja no Shōtai" (Japanese: 賢者の正体) | Ken Sanuma | January 22, 2023 |
| 34 | 14 | "Morning of Rebirth"; Transliteration: "Saisei no Asa" (Japanese: 再生の朝) | Shunji Yoshida | January 29, 2023 |
| 35 | 15 | "The Self, Worn Down"; Transliteration: "Mamō Suru Jiga" (Japanese: 摩耗する自我) | Masahiko Watanabe | February 5, 2023 |
| 36 | 16 | "Three Eternal Warriors"; Transliteration: "Fumetsu no San Senshi" (Japanese: 不滅の三戦士) | Kiyoko Sayama | February 12, 2023 |
| 37 | 17 | "What You Want to Protect"; Transliteration: "Mamo Ritai Mono" (Japanese: 守りたいもの) | Shunji Yoshida | February 19, 2023 |
| 38 | 18 | "Death of the Deathless"; Transliteration: "Fujimi no Shi" (Japanese: 不死身の死) | Matsuo Asami | February 26, 2023 |
| 39 | 19 | "And Then, Dawn"; Transliteration: "Soshite Hinode e" (Japanese: そして日の出へ) | Masahiko Watanabe | March 5, 2023 |
With young March returned to life, she and Bonichen go to seek aid to get Fushi to regain his human form and cherished memories of those whose lives he has touched over the centuries. Now aware of his latest ability to resurrect the dead, Fushi is overjoyed to reunite with his good friends Gugu and Tonari Dalton. As the Nokkers are overwhelmed by the people returning to life, they retreat, therefore saving the realm of Renril from destruction. Having realized that he and his fellow Guardians have never actually managed to accomplish anything for Fushi, a broken Kahaku leaves.
| 40 | 20 | "End of an Era"; Transliteration: "Jidai no Owari" (Japanese: 時代の終わり) | Kiyoko Sayama | March 12, 2023 |
With the Nokkers having retreated from the realm of Renril, Fushi and his resurrected lifelong close friends- March, Gugu and Tonari Dalton- get to talk about their new dreams. Meanwhile, Kahaku comes to a critical decision.
