= Shinji Nojima =

Japanese screenwriter (born 1963)

Shinji Nojima (野島 伸司, Nojima Shinji; born March 4, 1963) is a Japanese screenwriter.

== Career ==
Nojima was born in Niigata Prefecture. He graduated from Saitama Municipal Urawa High School in 1981. Following graduation, he entered Chūō University majoring in political science, though dropped out and moved to Los Angeles and entered UCLA.

In 1987, wanting to learn screenwriting, he took a course by the Japan Writers Guild. This led to projects such as Heart Cocktail.

In May 1988, he won an award for Toki niwa Haha no nai Ko no yō ni which marked the start of his career. He next did the screenwriting for the series Kimi ga Uso o Tuita (You Lied), which had an average viewership of 17.3%.

In 1993, he wrote Kōkō Kyōshi. The story took up various social taboos, such as love between a teacher and student, rape, and incest.

== Works ==
=== Dramas ===
- Toki niwa Haha no nai Ko no yō ni (1988)
- Kimi ga Uso o Tuita (1988)
- Aishiatteru kai! (1989)
- Suteki na Kataomoi (1990)
- 101-kaime no Propose (1991)
- In the Name of Love (1992)
- Kōkō Kyōshi (1993)
- Hitotsu Yane no Shita (1993)
- Miseinen (1995)
- Hitotsu Yane no Shita 2 (1997)
- Seija no Kōshin (1998)
- Seikimatsu no Uta (1998)
- Lip Stick (1999)
- Utsukushii Hito (1999)
- Strawberry on the Shortcake (2001)
- Golden Bowl (2002)
- Kōkō Kyōshi (2003) (2003)
- Pride (2004)
- Charming (2005)
- Bara no nai Hanaya (2008)
- Love Shuffle (2009)
- Gold (2010)
- Perfect Son (2012)
- 49 (2013)
- Platonic (2014)
- Oniichan, Gacha (2015)
- Our House (2016)
- Papa-katsu (2017)
- Ame ga Furu to Kimi wa Yasashii (2017)
- Kareshi o Rōn de Kaimashita (2018)
- Kiss Shitai Matsuge (2018)
- Takane no Hana (2018)
- Yuri dano Kan dano (2019)
- Eroi Kareshi ga Watashi o Madowasu (2021)

=== Movies ===
- Kimi wa Boku o Suki ni naru (1989)
- Suki! (1990)
- Kōkō Kyōshi: Mō Hitotsu no Mayu no Monogatari (1993)
- Heroine Interview (1994)
- Ie naki Ko (1994)

=== Anime ===
- Wonder Egg Priority (2021)
