= Strawberry on the Shortcake =

- Genre: Romance
- Written by: Shinji Nojima
- Directed by: Nobuhiro Doi; Hiroshi Matsubara
- Starring: Hideaki Takizawa; Kyoko Fukada; Yōsuke Kubozuka; Rina Uchiyama; Yuriko Ishida
- Country of origin: Japan
- Original language: Japanese
- No. of seasons: 1
- No. of episodes: 10

Production
- Running time: 54 minutes

Original release
- Network: TBS
- Release: 12 January – 16 March 2001

Strawberry on the Shortcake (ストロベリー・オンザ・ショートケーキ) is a Japanese romance television drama series which stars Hideaki Takizawa and Kyoko Fukada and aired on TBS in 2001. It was written by Shinji Nojima, and directed by Nobuhiro Doi and Hiroshi Matsubara.

== Plot ==
At some point, Manato Irie began to withdraw himself from the world. Even when picked on, it is not the real Irie, but an act. One day he meets a strange girl named Yui Misawa, who finds the tedium of everyday life unbearable, and teases Manato with her almost too upfront and honest manner. Alone and afraid Manato wavers but finds himself drawn to her, but his feelings for Yui are doomed to be unrequited, when he discovers that Yui is none other than his new step sister. While he struggles with his feelings for Yui, Manato begins to receive blue love letters in his shoe locker at school. He eventually discovers that they were left there by his next-door neighbour, Haruka. Meanwhile, Yui finds herself falling for senpai Saeki, who in turn is having an affair with his teacher, Asami-sensei.

== Cast ==
- Hideaki Takizawa as Manato Irie
- Kyoko Fukada as Yui Mizawa
- Yōsuke Kubozuka as Tetsuya Saeki
- Rina Uchiyama as Haruka Sawamura
- Yuriko Ishida as Mariko Asami

== Songs ==
- Title song: "Chiquitita" by ABBA
- Closing credits: "SOS" by ABBA
