= Kanata Aikawa =

Japanese voice actress

- 相川 奏多
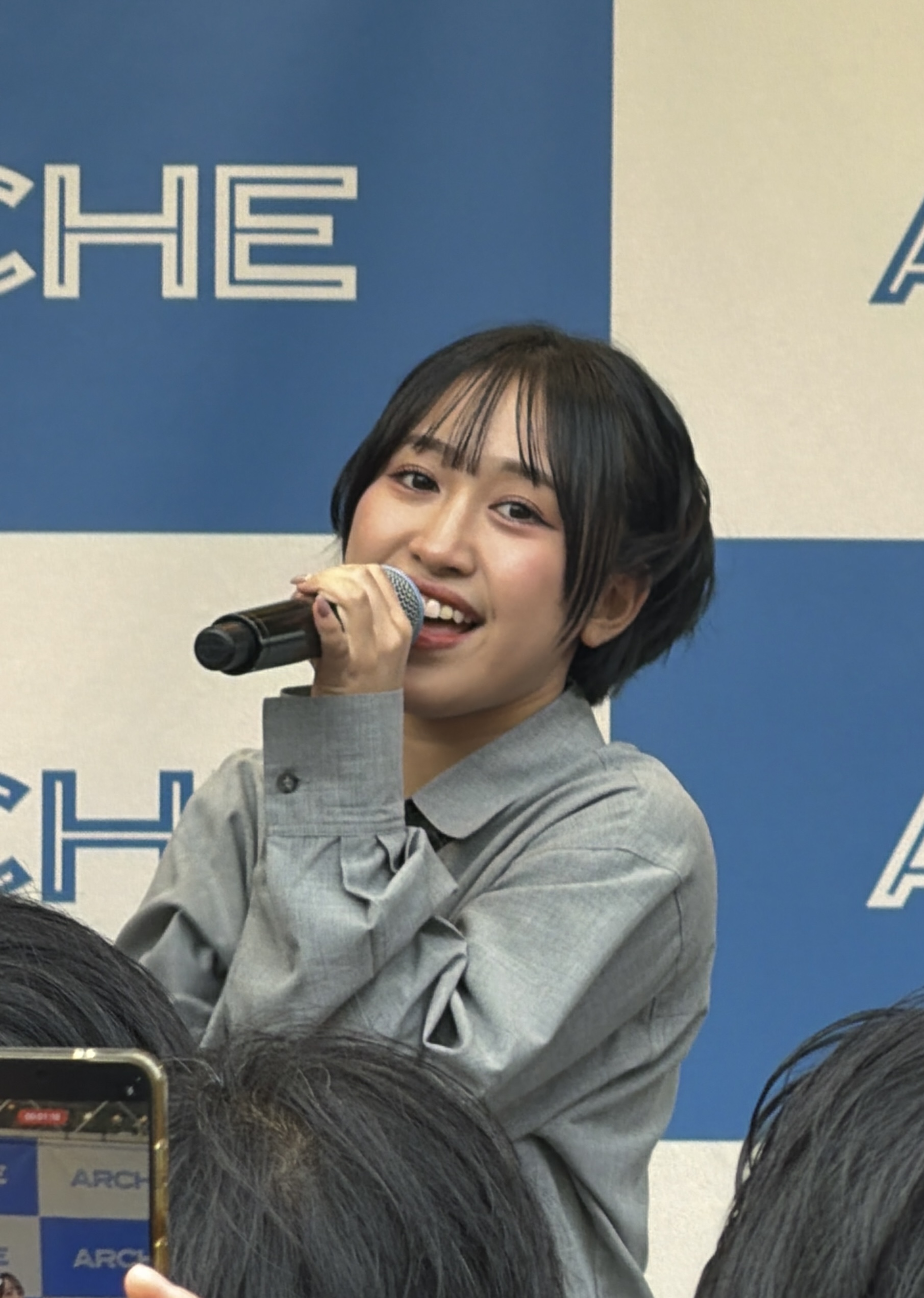
- Kanata Aikawa in 2025.
- Born: October 20, 2004 (age 21); Hyōgo Prefecture, Japan
- Occupation: Voice actress
- Years active: 2020–present
- Agent: Music Ray'n
- Notable work: Idoly Pride as Suzu Narumiya; Wonder Egg Priority as Ai Ohto
- Height: 153 cm (5 ft 0 in)

Kanata Aikawa (相川 奏多, Aikawa Kanata; born October 20, 2004) is a Japanese voice actress from Hyōgo Prefecture who is affiliated with Music Ray'n. She began her activities as a voice actress in 2020 after passing an audition held by Music Ray'n, and is part of their third generation of voice actresses. She is known for her roles as Suzu Narumiya in Idoly Pride and Ai Ohto in Wonder Egg Priority.

== Biography ==
Aikawa was born in Hyōgo Prefecture on October 20, 2004. From a young age, she liked to sing and aspired to become a singer. While in her fifth and sixth years of elementary school, Aikawa began watching anime and also became aware of the existence of the voice acting profession. She found it interesting that in some anime series, the cast members would also sing the ending theme. In particular, Sora Amamiya's acting and performance of the ending theme in The Seven Deadly Sins served as an inspiration for her in deciding to pursue a career in voice acting. To hone her skills, Aikawa would often read aloud and made it part of her daily routine.

While in junior high school, Aikawa wanted to join her school's basketball club due to her and her father's interest in the sport, but instead joined a club where she practiced using English, which she felt would help her improve her acting skills. Her family initially pushed her to pursue a career as a doctor, but permitted her plans to audition as a singer or voice actress. She applied for an audition held by the talent agency Music Ray'n, and after a series of screenings, participated in a training camp where the finalists would be chosen. Aikawa became one of the passers of the audition and would begin her entertainment activities in 2020. Her first role was as the character Suzu Narumiya in the multimedia franchise Idoly Pride. In 2021, she voiced Ai Ohto, the protagonist of the anime series Wonder Egg Priority. In 2022, Aikawa was one of the winners of the Best New Actress Award at the 16th Seiyu Awards.

== Filmography ==
=== Anime ===
2021

- Idoly Pride, Suzu Narumiya
- Wonder Egg Priority, Ai Ohto

=== Video games ===
2021

- Idoly Pride, Suzu Narumiya
