= Wonder Egg Priority =

Japanese anime television series

- Anime key visual

ワンダーエッグ・プライオリティ (Wandā Eggu Puraioriti)
- Genre: Fantasy; Psychological drama; Psychological horror
- Created by: Shinji Nojima
- Anime television series
- Directed by: Shin Wakabayashi; Yūta Yamazaki (assistant)
- Produced by: Masanori Miyake (chief); Toshio Nakatani (chief); Shōta Umehara (animation); Nobuhiro Nakayama; Masaki Shiode; Hiroyuki Ueno
- Written by: Shinji Nojima
- Music by: De De Mouse; Mito
- Studio: CloverWorks
- Licensed by: Crunchyroll (Note: In North America through Crunchyroll, LLC (formerly known as Funimation).); SEA: GaragePlay
- Original network: Nippon TV
- English network: US: Crunchyroll Channel
- Original run: January 13, 2021 –: March 31, 2021; June 30, 2021 (special)
- Episodes: 12 + special
- icon

Wonder Egg Priority (Japanese: ワンダーエッグ・プライオリティ, Hepburn: Wandā Eggu Puraioriti) (Note: Stylized as WONDER EGG ✦ PRiORiTY) is a Japanese anime television series created and written by Shinji Nojima, and directed by Shin Wakabayashi. Animated by CloverWorks, it is a co-production of Aniplex, Nippon Television, and D.N. Dream Partners, which aired on Nippon TV and other channels from January to March 2021. Additionally, a special episode was released in June of that year. The series centers on Ai Ohto, a teenage hikikomori who stops attending school following her friend's suicide. After discovering a 'Wonder Egg,' she enters a dream world where she and three other girls—each mourning a lost friend—fight grotesque "Wonder Killers", manifestations of trauma linked to suicides, and their goal is to resurrect their friends by protecting victims in this surreal realm.

Wonder Egg Priority marked Nojima's first anime project, following his work on live-action dramas. Seeking to reach younger audiences and explore stories impractical for live-action, he conceived it as a coming-of-age tale blending live-action realism with anime fantasy. Nippon TV producer-recommended debut TV anime director Wakabayashi assembled a team of mostly inexperienced young animators to realize this vision.

Initially praised by Western critics for its production quality, narrative complexity, and sensitive treatment of difficult themes, Wonder Egg Priority garnered more polarized reviews after its finale. The eleventh episode's focus on a new character's backstory and the special episode's conclusion drew particular criticism. Industry observers noted the production's struggles—an inexperienced team and tight schedule necessitated recruiting foreign hobbyist animators online to complete episodes, with some critics linking these challenges to the inconsistent reception.

== Plot ==
The series follows Ai Ohto, a junior high school student who is temporarily not attending school, following the suicide of her close friend Koito Nagase. During a late-night walk, Ai is guided by a mysterious voice to a deserted arcade, where she finds a gachapon machine that dispenses a "Wonder Egg". That night, Ai gets drawn into a dream world where the Wonder Egg cracks open to reveal a girl, whom Ai must protect from a horde of monsters called "Seeno Evils". When the voice tells Ai that saving enough people in this world may bring Koito back, she resolves to continue buying Wonder Eggs and protecting their inhabitants. Along the way, Ai meets three other girls in the same situation as her: Neiru Aonuma, Rika Kawai, and Momoe Sawaki.

== Characters ==
=== Main ===
Ai Ohto (大戸 アイ, Ōto Ai)
Voiced by: Kanata Aikawa (Japanese); Mikaela Krantz (English)
A 14-year-old girl with heterochromia, which has led her to be the subject of bullying. In the past, Ai became friends with Koito Nagase, a girl that had newly transferred from another high school. The two became close, as they only had each other. Tragedy ensued when Koito unexpectedly committed suicide by jumping off the roof of their school building. Following Koito's suicide, Ai ceased attending school. Ai is buying Wonder Eggs in order to bring Koito back to life, as well as discover the truth as to why Koito committed suicide. Her weapons of choice are a four-color ballpoint pen that can transform into a giant mace, a long, yellow-colored glowing ribbon-like bladed whip, two yellow penlights (light sticks) that can be used as double-bladed weapons, and prayer beads that allow her to see invisible Wonder Killers.
Neiru Aonuma (青沼 ねいる, Aonuma Neiru)
Voiced by: Tomori Kusunoki (Japanese); Dawn M. Bennett (English)
A quiet and reserved 14-year-old girl who makes no initiatives to get to know people. Despite her age, she is the president of a large company. Sometime in the past, Neiru was hospitalized after being violently stabbed by her sister. While recuperating from stabbing in the hospital she was informed that her sister committed suicide after assaulting her by jumping off of a bridge. The assault left Neiru with painful scars across her back, as well as complex feelings regarding her sister. Neiru is buying Wonder Eggs in order to bring her sister back to life. Her weapon of choice is a compass that can transform into either a great sword, two gigantic pliers with reactors, an assault rifle, a sniper rifle, or a pistol.
Rika Kawai (川井 リカ, Kawai Rika)
Voiced by: Shuka Saitō (Japanese); Anairis Quiñones (English)
A brash and outspoken 14-year-old girl who does not hesitate to say what is on her mind. Rika previously was a junior idol, and amassed a small fanbase. After discovering one of her biggest fans—an overweight girl named Chiemi—was shoplifting in order to give her gifts, Rika tried to stop Chiemi's shoplifting by insulting and lying to Chiemi in an attempt to turn Chiemi on her, claiming that she could not be friends with a fan and "would be embarrassed to be seen with a fatty." She would later discover that Chiemi died after starving herself thin. Rika is buying Wonder Eggs in order to bring Chiemi back to life. Her weapon of choice is a pair of two box cutters that act as swords.
Momoe Sawaki (沢木 桃恵, Sawaki Momoe)
Voiced by: Hinaki Yano (Japanese); Michelle Rojas (English)
A 14-year-old girl who is often mistaken for a boy due to her androgynous appearance. She is the niece of Ai's homeroom teacher Shūichirō Sawaki. Momoe was once close friends with a girl named Haruka, who was the only one of her classmates that recognized she was a girl and treated her femininely. One day, however, Haruka made romantic advances toward Momoe and requested that she touch her. Momoe rejected Haruka's advances and Haruka later committed suicide, leading Momoe to believe that she may have been responsible. Momoe is buying Wonder Eggs in order to bring Haruka back to life. Her weapon of choice is an umbrella with a spearhead at the end.

=== Supporting ===
Koito Nagase (長瀬 小糸, Nagase Koito)
Voiced by: Azusa Tadokoro (Japanese); Suzie Yeung (English)
Ai's best friend. Before the events of the series, she was killed when she accidentally fell from the roof of her school in an incident initially believed to be a suicide. She is also the main reason why Ai is searching for Wonder Eggs so that she can be brought back to life.
Shūichirō Sawaki (沢木 修一郎, Sawaki Shūichirō)
Voiced by: Masatomo Nakazawa (Japanese); Stephen Fu (English)
Momoe's uncle who is also Ai and Koito's homeroom teacher and the club advisor of the art club. He later becomes Ai's mother's fiance.
Acca (アカ, Aka)
Voiced by: Yūya Uchida (Japanese); Brendan Blaber (English)
A mannequin-like humanoid who guides Ai and the others to fight in the Egg World for unknown reasons. He is capable of communicating with them telepathically through any object or creature in both the real and Egg World. Compared to his counterpart Ura-Acca, he is more professional, formal, and strict.
Ura-Acca (裏アカ, Ura-aka)
Voiced by: Hiroki Takahashi (Japanese); Ian Sinclair (English)
A mannequin-like humanoid who guides Ai and the others to fight in the Egg World for unknown reasons. He is capable of communicating with them telepathically through any object or creature in both the real and Egg World. Compared to his counterpart Acca, he is more laid-back and willing to let the girls relax. He also seems to be more directly supportive of the girls search for truth, as demonstrated by him "coincidentally" giving Neiru Kotobuki's Egg.
Frill (フリル, Furiru)
Voiced by: Megumi Yamaguchi (Japanese); Felecia Angelle (English)
Frill is an artificial human created by Acca and Ura-Acca in the past. She is also the creator of the humanoids Hyphen (ハイフン, Haifun), Dot (ドット, Dotto) and Kirara Rodriguez Matured XVIII Evening Star SS Plum (キララロドリゲスマチュード18世宵の明星SSプラン, Kirara Rodorigesu Machūdo 18-sei Yoi no Myōjō SS Puran) (all voiced by Ikue Ohtani). According to series writer Shinji Nojima, Frill's story arc was inspired by Pinocchio.

== Production ==
Original character design concepts for Wonder Egg Priority drawn by Saki Takahashi

Wonder Egg Priority is a co-production between Aniplex, Nippon Television, and D.N. Dream Partners. It was directed by Shin Wakabayashi, written by Shinji Nojima and features character designs by Saki Takahashi. Taracod served as concept artist, Keisuke Kobayashi as core animator, Yūki Funao as art director, and De De Mouse and Mito as music composers. The series was Wakabayashi's first time serving as series director for a television anime; he had previously directed the web short series 22/7: The Diary of Our Days. Wonder Egg Priority also marked the first time Kanata Aikawa had been cast in a leading voice role, and De De Mouse had been a music composer of an anime work.

Shinji Nojima, a well-known writer of live-action drama television, first conceived Wonder Egg Priority when he observed that live-action dramas had recently been less popular with the younger audience that he wanted to target with his next story. Nojima was attracted to the medium of anime due to his interest in reaching its engaged fandom that would often express their own interpretations in fan works, and his desire to tell a story that would not be feasible in a live-action production. Feeling that many anime leaned too far towards the fantastical, Nojima desired to find a middle ground between the realism of live-action dramas and the more exaggerated qualities of anime. As Nojima lacked familiarity with the anime industry and did not know who would be best to realize his vision, a producer from Nippon TV connected him with Aniplex, Cloverworks and Shin Wakabayashi, who would come to direct the series. Nojima said he did not consult Wakabayashi and the animation team about the scripts, as he was confident in their ability to realize his scripts as a high quality animation, and placed his complete trust in them to realize the story as they felt best. The difference in the half hour timeslot typical of late night anime as opposed to the one hour timeslots for live-action dramas that Nojima was used to was not a major creative consideration for him, as he was confident in his ability to pace the story effectively and therefore instead focused on the number of episode scripts. However, as the plot grew in complexity, he realized it would not be possible for him to finish all of his envisioned narrative in only twelve episodes, and thus some of the plot was cut from the final scripts as a result.

Wonder Egg Priority's visual style was frequently compared by critics to the works of Naoko Yamada; Wakabayashi had previously worked with Yukiko Horiguchi, who formerly contributed character designs to K-On! and Tamako Market, both directed by Yamada, as she also provided the character designs for 22/7. Kevin Cirugeda of SakugaBlog said that though many directors, most recently inspired by Yamada's 2018 film Liz and the Blue Bird, had tried to emulate her style, Wakabayashi's collaboration with Horiguchi enabled him to replicate that style more accurately than any other director who had previously attempted such. Cirugeda did note, however, that Kyoto Animation's unique production pipeline inevitably made a perfect replication of Yamada's style nearly impossible, but that for Wonder Egg Priority, Wakabayashi and lead animator Keisuke Kobayashi had settled on a distinct style of "over-articulation" that was perceived as having "raised the volume" to distract from the small imperfections. The series marked many young animators' debuts in certain production roles, as Wakabayashi and his team recruited such new talents as Yuki Yonemori on episode 3, in his first time working as an episode director, and Yuzu Hori and Yuichiro Komuro, performing episode direction and storyboarding duties respectively, for their first time on episode 4. Episode direction and storyboarding work on most of Wonder Egg Priority's episodes was delegated to a single animator, which Cirugeda believed was ideal as the team "dyed each episode with their own unique flavor", although he noted the possible drawback of overwhelming the inexperienced animation talents recruited to the production.

In planning Wonder Egg Priority's cast of characters, Nojima gave minimal details in the script and outlines to give the animation staff freedom to flesh them out according to their interpretations. Wakabayashi selected Saki Takahashi (who also came to debut in the role of Chief Animation Director on the series), (Note: Chief Animation Director (総作画監督, Sou Sakuga Kantoku), supervisor of character animation, usually delegated to character designer) an animator previously known for her work on Darling in the Franxx and Her Blue Sky, to do the character designs, as her initial drafts of the designs were the first to strongly catch his interest. Takahashi enthusiastically joined the project, as doing character designs for an original production had been something to which she had aspired since beginning her career as an animator, and was also intrigued by Nojima's characterizations which she said "highlighted both the darkness in humans as well as their innocence." According to Wakabayashi, the design and characterization of protagonist Ai Ohto was strongly influenced by Miu Takigawa, a character featured in 22/7: The Diary of Our Days (Wakabayashi's previous work). Takahashi's initial designs for Ai were more in line with common media stereotypes of hikikomori individuals, with a moody and dark attitude about her, however Wakabayashi, believing Ai to be a fundamentally curious and cheerful character, asked Takahashi to alter how Ai was drawn in order to further bring out that side of her personality.

There was also a strong attention to detail focused on the clothing worn by the characters, as Wakabayashi felt it was important for their attire to be realistic, as well as deliberately curated in order to express each character's personality and disposition. Rika's outfit was designed to suggest that she was "tired of caring about her looks" as a former idol, while Neiru's was meant to imply that she wore whatever expensive clothing was selected for her by her assistant. Momoe's design was noted by Takahashi as the most challenging to create, due to her androgynous design and the idea that she curated her clothing according to her insecurities about her appearance and gender presentation, coupled with the need for the characters' attire to not be "too fashionable" in the interest of realism. Takahashi noted that she believed Momoe did not have many feminine-coded clothes in her wardrobe, contributing to her choice to wear only a dress when she is asked out on a date in the tenth episode.

The show's "action director", animator Yusuke Kawakami, was previously known for having contributed to the animation of Black Clover and SSSS.Gridman. Wakabayashi had previously invited Kawakami to participate in the production of The Diary of Our Days, an offer he had to turn down due to scheduling conflicts. Kawakami joined the production primarily because he had grown tired of being in charge of action sequences that he felt were too divorced from narrative, and wished to focus not only on action but also scenes of realistic drama and everyday life that the action scenes would be designed to complement, an opportunity he felt that he would be afforded working with Wakabayashi. In collaboration with Wakabayashi and storyboard artist Keisuke Shinohara, Kawakami conceived the grounded everyday settings for the action sequences with this interest in mind. Wakabayashi tried his best to ensure the production "felt like a democratic environment" and that new ideas and communication from the staff were welcome, which Kawakami and assistant director Yuta Yamazaki agreed led to an improved quality of the final work. According to Cirugeda, Wakabayashi's careful sensitivity towards the needs and limits of his team was a strong contributor to the strength of the work's sustained quality despite tight deadlines amidst an unaccommodating production schedule.

=== Production issues ===
Information from industry insiders and several broadcast events showcase some of the issues the series faced during its production. In one instance, the staff were unable to complete the 8th episode of the series on time, and so a recap episode was instead aired in order to provide more time for the team. The production falling behind and the airing of the recap episode disrupted the overall broadcast schedule, leaving the originally planned twelfth episode initially unreleased, eventually to be reworked into the special episode aired three months later. Said special episode began with a recap segment that took up the first half of the one hour broadcasting timeslot in which it was scheduled, for which it was criticized, as the episode had been advertised as a double length installment. While CloverWorks as a company is considered a "freelancing-heavy studio" (indicating that most of the work on the studio's projects come from freelancers, rather than studio employees), the situation became dire enough for the company to reach out to foreigners online, many of them without Japanese-language literacy or experience working on a television anime, for help with the animation production. Freelance translators Blou and Far were originally contracted for episode 10 of the series, initially helping Croatia-based animator Ani communicate with production assistant Hayato Satō. However, they became more involved in the final episodes, being credited for overseas animation assistance (作画海外協力), animation/English translation assistance (作画英語翻訳協力), and overseas animator part production assistance (海外Animator part制作進行協力) for their contributions in helping recruit and assist foreign animators, and bridging the language barrier between them and the domestic production team. The special episode reportedly entered into the second key animation process only five days before it was aired, prompting a displeased animator to air their grievances in a post on Bilibili.

Although the instance of an episode not being finished on time was widely known due to the recap episode having substituted it, the series as a whole was plagued with issues in which episodes were normally finished only hours before being aired. Several times, members of the series' production team were sent to the hospital, most notably series producer Shouta Umehara who was reported to have been hospitalized two times in a since-deleted tweet. Kevin Cirugeda of Sakugablog attributed the struggles to the production's limited pool of animation staff as well as the systemic shortcomings typical of TV anime production processes which he characterized as "incompatible" with the staff's creative ambitions. Cirugeda suggested that such issues in anime tend to occur due to production committees not caring about the "quality of the product [or its staff] beyond its marketability", which he pointed out Aniplex of being guilty of due to "shamelessly ly[ing]" as the lead company of the Wonder Egg Priority production committee, saying "anyone paying attention could notice what they were trying to hide." The troubled nature of the production was acknowledged by multiple English-language critics in discussions and reviews of the show, who attributed several of their criticisms to the production struggles. The production's use of overseas animators led critics Vrai Kaiser and Mercedez Clewis to express concerns that it might pave the way for future anime productions to do the same, which they worried could lead to similar complicity by production committees in the case of other troubled productions. Blou and Far, in being interviewed by Anime News Network about their experience on the production, advised readers that production assistants are "quite desperate" for help, often attempting to recruit foreigners with minimal regard for their skill in animation or art, and cautioned prospective animators to think carefully about their qualifications and be wary of the potential challenges and drawbacks of accepting any such offers.

== Broadcast and release ==
Wonder Egg Priority aired on Nippon TV's AnichU programming block and other channels from January 13 to March 31, 2021. Kanata Aikawa, Tomori Kusunoki, Shuka Saitō, and Hinaki Yano, under the unit name Anemoneria (アネモネリア), performed both the opening and ending songs, respectively titled "Sudachi no Uta" (巣立ちの歌) and "Life Is Cider" (Life is サイダー, Raifu Izu Saidā). Actress Nao makes a special appearance in episode 7 as Rika's mother, Chiaki Kawai. During the last episode broadcast, it was announced that a special episode would be aired on June 30, 2021. The special was scheduled for a 1-hour timeslot, although in reality, half of that time was taken up by a recap of the main series, making its effective runtime constitute a normal length episode.

Funimation licensed the series and streamed it on its website in North America and the British Isles, in Europe through Wakanim, and in Australia and New Zealand through AnimeLab. On March 30, 2021, Funimation announced the series would be receiving an English dub, with the first two episodes premiering the next day. Following Sony's acquisition of Crunchyroll, the series was moved to Crunchyroll. GaragePlay licensed the series in Southeast Asia and streamed it on Bilibili. The series received a North American Blu-ray release on April 26, 2022.

=== Episodes ===
No.	Title (Note: All English titles are taken from Funimation.)	Directed by	Storyboarded by	Original release date (Note: Episodes are released every Wednesday at midnight JST on streaming platforms, an hour and 29 minutes before the original air time on Nippon TV.)
1	"The Domain of Children"; Transliteration: "Kodomo no Ryōbun" (Japanese: 子供の領分)	Shin Wakabayashi	Shin Wakabayashi	January 13, 2021
Ai Ohto becomes withdrawn after the death of her best friend, Koito Nagase, and has not been attending school since. While walking late at night, Ai is led into a garden by Acca and Ura-Acca, who give her an egg that they promise will grant her wish. When Ai breaks it in the dream, the egg hatches into Kurumi Saijō, a girl her age who committed suicide. Kurumi briefs Ai on the rules of the Egg World as they are attacked by Seeno Evils and Kurumi's Wonder Killer. Realizing her apathy had a role in Koito's death, Ai uses Kurumi's pen to defeat the Wonder Killer. Having successfully saved Kurumi, Ai learns that the more girls that she saves, the higher the chance Koito will return.
2	"The Terms of Friendship"; Transliteration: "Tomodachi no Jōken" (Japanese: 友達の条件)	Yūta Yamazaki	Yūta Yamazaki	January 20, 2021
Ai meets Neiru Aonuma, another girl buying eggs from Acca and Ura-Acca's garden, but Neiru has no interest in befriending her. In Ai's next dream, she is tasked with protecting Minami Suzuhara, a young gymnast who committed suicide after enduring abuse from her coach. Ai recognizes Minami's lack of confidence is a cry for help and uses her ribbon to aid her in destroying the Wonder Killer form of Minami's coach. When Ai returns from the Egg World, Neiru becomes hospitalized after taking too many egg missions at once. Nevertheless, Ai visits her in the hospital and befriends her.
3	"A Bare Knife"; Transliteration: "Hadaka no Naifu" (Japanese: 裸のナイフ)	Yūki Yonemori	Yūki Yonemori	January 27, 2021
Ai meets Rika Kawai, a former junior idol who cheats her out of her money to buy eggs. Ai feels troubled when Rika continues to insert herself in her personal life, but after falling asleep next to her, she is drawn into Rika's Egg World. The two of them are tasked to protect Miko and Mako, two fangirls who committed suicide to follow after their favorite singer, Yu-Yu. During this time, Ai learns that Rika wants to save Chiemi, one of her fans, after the latter had starved herself to death when Rika tried to get her to stop shoplifting. When the two confront Miko and Mako's Wonder Killer, a stalker of Yu-Yu, Rika becomes petrified and turns into stone.
4	"Colorful Girls"; Transliteration: "Karafuru Gāruzu" (Japanese: カラフル・ガールズ)	Yūichirō Komuro	Yūichirō Komuro	February 3, 2021
With the help of Miko and Mako, Ai distracts the Wonder Killer and uses their glowsticks as weapons. As Ai fights, Rika recovers from petrification and helps her defeat the Wonder Killer. At the same time, Momoe Sawaki, a boyish girl attempting to save her friend, Haruka, defeats the Wonder Killers of Miwa and Mizuki. However, like Haruka, Miwa and Mizuki fall in love with her, and Rika and Neiru mistake for a boy. Momoe becomes upset, as she prefers to be seen as a girl rather than a substitute for a boy. However, when Ai calls out to her and acknowledges she is a girl, she is cheered up and becomes her friend.
5	"The Girl Flautist"; Transliteration: "Fue o Fuku Shōjo" (Japanese: 笛を吹く少女)	Shinichirō Ushijima	Shinichirō Ushijima	February 10, 2021
After Neiru defeats the Wonder Killers of Ayaka and Aoi, she, along with Rika and Momoe, visit Ai's home. Ai states that, along with saving Koito, she wants to learn why she committed suicide. The girls believe that Mr. Sawaki, their teacher, may have been involved, as Koito was close to him and was jealous that he chose Ai to be the model for his painting. As the girls visit the garden to buy eggs, Rika suggests they stop going to the Egg World. However, Neiru reveals that her sister attempted to murder her and that she is going for her personal gain, not to save her.
6	"Punch Drunk Day"; Transliteration: "Panchi Doranku Dē" (Japanese: パンチドランク・デー)	Yūsuke Yamamoto	Keisuke Shinohara	February 17, 2021
The girls confront a new enemy, Haters, during their prolonged stay at the Egg World, and to combat them, Acca and Ura-Acca give them Pomanders, animal companions that can help them battle. Ai protects a schizophrenic patient named Yae Yoshida from her invisible Wonder Killer. When the Wonder Killer knocks Ai unconscious, she recalls that earlier in the day, her mother revealed she is dating Mr. Sawaki, and Neiru suggested that Ai's anger over this may have been because she is in love with Mr. Sawaki herself. Using Yae's rosary beads, Ai forces the Wonder Killer to reveal itself and it vanishes, having been acknowledged at last. The next day, after reassessing her feelings, Ai runs to Mr. Sawaki to tell him she will be attending school again.
7	"After School at 14"; Transliteration: "Jūyon-sai no Hōkago" (Japanese: 14才の放課後)	Maiko Kobayashi	Maiko Kobayashi	February 24, 2021
Rika reaches her 15th birthday, and she asks her inattentive mother to reveal the identity of her missing father as she had promised. However, as her mother had engaged with numerous men at the time, even she is unsure who her real father is. When Rika enters the Egg World, she is tasked to protect Shino, a girl who had participated in a cult suicide. Shino defends the Wonder Killer form of her cult's leader, and, defeated, Rika questions her existence, allowing the Wonder Killer to attack her. However, she is protected by her Pomander, Mannen, and becomes motivated from its support as well as her friends. Rika defeats the Wonder Killer and comes to terms about her birth, admitting to her mother that she will leave her when the time is right.
8	"The Happy Friendship Plan"; Transliteration: "Akarui Tomodachi Keikaku" (Japanese: 明るい友達計画)	Eita Higashikubo	N/A	March 3, 2021
Acca and Ura-Acca recap the events of episodes 1 to 7.
9	"A Story No One Knows"; Transliteration: "Dare mo Shiranai Monogatari" (Japanese: 誰も知らない物語)	Yūta Yamazaki	Yūta Yamazaki	March 10, 2021
Neiru invites Ai and the others over to her home. During their visit, she shows them a life support chamber where her friend and fellow Plati scientist, Kotobuki Awano, rests in a coma after a fatal attempt at leaping into parallel worlds. Having met Kotobuki in her dream and rescuing her from her Wonder Killer, Neiru becomes conflicted on whether to take her off life support at her request to prevent her body from being dissected. Rika and Momoe leave, but they spy Neiru's secretary, Tanabe, discussing Neiru's findings with Acca and Ura-Acca. Ai stays behind and promises to support Neiru's decision, as the two shut down the chamber together.
10	"Confession"; Transliteration: "Kokuhaku" (Japanese: 告白)	Yūichirō Komuro	Yūichirō Komuro	March 17, 2021
Momoe is asked out on a date by a boy, but the boy apologizes when they meet up as he thought she was a boy. In the Egg World, Momoe is tasked to protect Kaoru Kurita, a transgender boy, from the Wonder Killer form of his PE teacher, who raped and impregnated him after he confessed his gender identity. After he is rescued, Kaoru confesses to her before he disappears, with Momoe finally having someone seeing her romantically as a girl after her previous failed date. Momoe clears the game, the Haruka statue vanishes as the real Haruka appears before Momoe, only to vanish into smoke. Hyphen approaches Momoe and kills her Pomander, Panic, force-feeding her its flesh. After this, Momoe becomes traumatized and refuses to return to the Egg World. Meanwhile, Ai attends Mr. Sawaki's art exhibit to learn the truth behind Koito's death.
11	"An Adult Child"; Transliteration: "Otona no Kodomo" (Japanese: おとなのこども)	Mitsuru Hagi (Note: Japanese: 八木充. As of 2022, this name has not appeared in other anime titles and is likely to be a pseudonym.)	Mitsuru Hagi	March 24, 2021
Ura-Acca tells Ai about why he and Acca recruited the "Warriors of Eros" to the Egg World: years ago, the two created an AI named Frill, who was built in the image of a 14-year-old girl. Frill became jealous when Acca married Azusa and killed her. 14 years later, their daughter, Himari, committed suicide. Despite destroying Frill, Acca and Ura-Acca noticed an increase in 14-year-old girls committing suicide and believed she was somehow involved. Meanwhile, after Rika clears the game, Chiemi vanishes and Dot kills Mannen.
12	"An Unvanquished Warrior"; Transliteration: "Makezaru Senshi" (Japanese: 負けざる戦士)	Yūki Yonemori	Yūki Yonemori	March 31, 2021
Momoe no longer wants anything to do with the Egg World, while Rika has become so blinded by revenge that she is banned from entering again. In her next egg venture, Ai is tasked to protect a version of herself from a parallel world, who had committed suicide by drowning. Parallel Ai's Wonder Killer is Mr. Sawaki, and he traps Ai in an illusion where Koito tempts her to jump from the school building. However, Ai, having come to terms with her feelings for Mr. Sawaki and her relationship with her mother, convinces Parallel Ai to admit her regrets and how much she values her mother. After defeating the Wonder Killer, Ai clears the game, and Frill's final agent, Kirara, confronts her. Parallel Ai sacrifices herself to save Ai, getting her eye gouged out in the process.
13 Special	"My Priority"; Transliteration: "Watashi no Puraioriti" (Japanese: 私のプライオリティ)	Shin Wakabayashi	Shin Wakabayashi	June 30, 2021
Ai discovers Koito has returned but with no memory of her, all the while recalling Mr. Sawaki revealing that Koito actually fell by accident after she attempted to blackmail him. Tanabe calls Ai and Rika to meet a parallel version of Kotobuki, who has crossed over into their world. Through this, Ai realizes that Koito and the other girls had been replaced by themselves from other parallel worlds due to a timeline shift from saving the girls in the Egg World. As they watch Neiru's dream recording, they discover that Neiru has cleared the game, saving Airu, but is forced to stay in the Egg World with Frill. After learning that Neiru is an AI built by the original Kotobuki in Airu's image, Ai and Rika withdraw from the game. A while later, Ai has transferred schools and has drifted apart from Rika and Momoe, but after remembering how much Neiru means to her, she returns to Acca and Ura-Acca's garden to save her.

== Reception ==
The character of Frill, introduced in episode 11, and her role in the plot, divided viewers

=== Critical response ===
In English-language coverage, Wonder Egg Priority received near immediate acclaim upon beginning its airing. Reviews in Polygon, Anime News Network, Anime Feminist, and other outlets, were widely euphoric, strongly praising the high quality animation, soundtrack, music, voice acting, and narrative, as well as the handling of sensitive thematic material such as bullying, sexual assault, and suicide, which was generally seen as effective and captivating. The series was commonly described as one of the best new anime of 2021. Comparisons were positively drawn to the work of such directors as Naoko Yamada, Satoshi Kon, and Kunihiko Ikuhara, among others. However, the darker story elements received some criticisms, with some reviewers expressing discomfort with the anime's difficult themes, or voicing concerns that the story could fumble the handling of such topics further down the line. Discussing the production of the first few episodes, Kevin Cirugeda of SakugaBlog praised the quality of the animation, saying that director Shin Wakabayashi had made the most of his team's limitations in emulating Naoko Yamada's work at Kyoto Animation. Noting the "enchanting" first episode as one of the "best premieres" he had seen in recent memory, Cirugeda said it was unsurprising it had immediately attracted an enthusiastic audience.

In a feature for Polygon, Kambole Campbell strongly praised Wonder Egg's refreshing take on magical girl genre tropes, positively highlighting the use of magical realism and flower language (a point at which another comparison to Yamada was drawn) as well as the perceived attention to the "systemic root" of the social issues at the center of the narrative. Numerous other critics have drawn similar comparisons to the magical girl genre, citing such anime as Flip Flappers and Puella Magi Madoka Magica. However, series creator Shinji Nojima has rejected this classification; though Nojima acknowledged the similarity, he has referred to it as a fantasy series. Writing for The A.V. Club, Juan Barquin (reviewing the series' main 12 episodes) called Wonder Egg "spellbinding" and praised it for its perceived interest in catharsis for the abuse victims portrayed within the story, comparing it to rape revenge films.

As Wonder Egg Priority continued its weekly airing, the series garnered a more mixed critical response. A dialogue in the fourth episode, wherein the characters of Acca and Ura-Acca explain that the "Wonder Eggs" only contain girls because motivations of suicides supposedly differ between genders, was widely criticized, prompting Wakabayashi to say on Twitter that a dissenting line of dialogue from Neiru had been cut for time. However, Kevin Cirugeda commented in a later Sakuga Blog post that Nojima, in an interview, had echoed the same sentiment as Acca and Ura-Acca had done in their dialogue, which he criticized as being incongruous with the perceived themes of the story, and said gave the impression that "not everyone is on the same thematic page". Steve Jones of Anime News Network initially called the series a "slam dunk," commending the explorations of idol culture and transgender themes, but described later episodes as "uneven" and having "rough patches". In commenting on the perceived declining quality of the series, Jones attributed it partially to the production difficulties faced by the animation staff. Episode 10, in particular, was praised for its heavy focus on transgender issues through the development of Momoe and introduction of one-off trans male character Kaoru, both by Jones and But Why Tho? contributor Mercedez Clewis, who said it prompted a "full-on ugly cry" due to their emotionally relating to the story as a non-binary woman. However, some criticism was directed at the choice to follow up Momoe's story, widely read as expressing validation of her gender identity as a trans woman, with the "traumatic" conclusion of her being forced to eat her animal companion.

The eleventh episode garnered particular criticisms for its late introduction of the character of Frill and the dedication to her backstory, which was seen as disrupting the show's already developing narrative arcs. While Jones enjoyed the episode, he opined it was not "the one Wonder Egg Priority needed right now." Jones called the shift in focus from the core cast to Acca and Ura-Acca a "grave miscalculation", and said that while he saw the potential for Frill's character to enrich the story, it only served to complicate the ongoing plot and deflate any potential for a satisfying finale. Clewis felt that episode 11 turned to "grimdark" territory, despite appreciating the narrative depth and sustained production value. Though they called Frill an "interesting" character who "I desperately wish I could hug," Clewis said her late introduction was "strange," and criticized the choice to tell her story from the point of view of Acca and Ura-Acca, in the perceived role of Frill's abusive parents, as "hurtful" and removing nuance from her arc. They also expressed confusion as to if Frill's "popping" tic was meant to carry sexual connotations, describing it as "uncomfortable" and out-of-place considering that the series had not previously appeared interested in sexualizing its female characters.

Reception to the airing of episode 12, the series' final contiguously aired episode, was overall polarized. Jones' review was positive, with praise for the open-ended conclusion to Ai's character arc. While he expressed cautious optimism concerning the announcement of the eventual end to the series in its special episode, he said he "would not have minded this being the final word" and that the show had, at the least, remained "interesting" throughout. Michael Goldstein of Otaku USA felt differently, saying that the incomplete nature of the story made it impossible for them to decide whether to give it a recommendation until they had seen the special. While Clewis enjoyed episode 12, they opined the series was becoming "too plotty" and said that they were deeply saddened to hear of the production crunch that the animation staff had endured, concluding their review with trepidatious anticipation for the special episode. Chris Cimi of Otaquest, while praising the show, expressed that despite its quality, they felt that knowing of the production crunch made it difficult to enthusiastically recommend. Reviewing the contiguous 12 episodes, Siliconera's Dani Maddox was mixed, praising the main characters and the series' illustration of their lack of agency as children, but felt that the anime did not give the same weight to the suicide victims seen in the Egg World segments, calling them "fodder" and opining that they were "treated horribly".

Reviews of the special episode were generally negative, with both the story and animation seen as failing to live up to the standard set by the main series. It was often said that it failed to satisfyingly conclude the story and even actively made the series worse, with criticism usually directed at the conclusion to the subplot surrounding Koito and Sawaki. Calling the episode a "disaster," Jones said, "I just can't fathom the amount of tone-deafness it takes to spin an uncomfortably creepy relationship between a teacher and student into a situation where the student shoulders all the blame for her suicide." He described it as the "single worst" way that arc could have ended, and otherwise found little to praise. Despite Jones' criticism, he said the special did not ruin the show for him, and in a "Worst Anime of 2021" list said he still felt "a lot of affection" towards it, and hoped its creators would "move onto better things." Clewis, on the other hand, said the special had negated most of what they felt was special about the anime, disappointing them so deeply that "all of my good faith for the series is burnt out" and they would not want to engage with a sequel. Writing for Fanbyte, Vrai Kaiser called the special "grossly irresponsible", and felt that it, alongside episode 12's retroactively observed implications that Ai's parallel world counterpart was mistaken about Sawaki, ruined the series overall by casting doubt on the stories of the other suicide victims previously seen in the Egg World. In contrast, writing for CBR, Xianwei Wu said the special episode was "good" despite the perceived impossibility of a satisfying resolution to the overall narrative, and expressed hope for a second season. Reviewing the full series for The Outerhaven, Josh Piedra responded positively, saying it had been worthwhile and overall "fantastic", with the caveat that the special episode did not satisfyingly wrap up the story. However, Piedra also said that he felt the special did not take away from the quality of the other 12 episodes, and nonetheless recommended the series.

Writing for Anime Feminist after the series' completion, Alex Henderson called the series "deeply disingenuous", believing it had undermined its themes of social ills and overcoming trauma by positioning Frill as "the root of all evil". Though they saw Frill as a victim of abuse from Acca and Ura-Acca, they expressed disappointment with the story's apparent siding with the latter's point of view, which they characterized as "a double-punch of victim-blaming." Pointing out the conclusion to the Koito/Sawaki subplot in the special episode, which they similarly perceived as dismissive of the relevant social issues, Henderson expressed that they were disappointed in Wonder Egg's perceived failure to offer any satisfying conclusion to its social critiques, and concluded by saying that "A discussion about the systemic violence against vulnerable young people cannot simply stay a spectacle about monsters and maidens."

In a "Best Anime Dubs" feature for Anime News Network, AJ of The Cartoon Cipher praised Wonder Egg Priority's English dub and its "reserved" performances, which they felt suited the tone of the show well, and in particular complimented Mikaela Krantz's "carefully manipulated" vocal performance as Ai Ohto, while criticizing some minor flaws such as the inconsistent sound quality of the recording and "slight linguistic hitches".

=== Accolades ===
Year	Award	Category	Nominee	Result	Ref.
2021	IGN Awards	Best Anime Series	Wonder Egg Priority	Nominated	
2022	6th Crunchyroll Anime Awards	Best Protagonist	Ai Ohto	Nominated	
2022	6th Crunchyroll Anime Awards	Best Girl	Ai Ohto	Nominated	
2022	6th Crunchyroll Anime Awards	Best Animation	Wonder Egg Priority	Nominated	
2022	6th Crunchyroll Anime Awards	Best Director	Shin Wakabayashi	Nominated	
2022	6th Crunchyroll Anime Awards	Best Action	Wonder Egg Priority	Nominated	
2022	6th Crunchyroll Anime Awards	Best Drama	Wonder Egg Priority	Nominated	
2022	6th Crunchyroll Anime Awards	Best Fantasy	Wonder Egg Priority	Nominated	
2022	6th Crunchyroll Anime Awards	Best Character Design	Saki Takahashi	Nominated	
2022	6th Crunchyroll Anime Awards	Best Score	De De Mouse and Mito	Nominated	
2022	6th Crunchyroll Anime Awards	Best Voice Artist Performance (Japanese)	Kanata Aikawa as Ai Ohto	Nominated	
2022	6th Crunchyroll Anime Awards	Best Voice Artist Performance (English)	Anairis Quiñones as Rika Kawai	Nominated	
