= Hinaki Yano =

Japanese voice actress

- 矢野 妃菜喜
- Born: March 5, 1997 (age 29); Hyōgo Prefecture, Japan
- Other names: Hinaki Tsukikage (月影 妃菜喜, Tsukikage Hinaki)
- Occupations: Actress; voice actress; singer
- Years active: 2008–present
- Agent: Sony Music Artists
- Known for: Love Live! Nijigasaki High School Idol Club as Yu Takasaki; Wonder Egg Priority as Momoe Sawaki; Selection Project as Suzune Miyama; Umamusume: Pretty Derby as Kitasan Black
- Musical career
- Genres: J-pop; anime song
- Instrument: Vocals
- Member of: Dusty Fruits Club (2017–present)
- Formerly of: piecees (2008); momonaki (2009); Shiritsu Ebisu Chugaku (2009–2010); Utata Neko Kagekidan (2014–2015)

Hinaki Yano (矢野 妃菜喜, Yano Hinaki; born March 5, 1997) is a Japanese actress and singer from Hyōgo Prefecture. She began her career as an idol under Stardust Promotion in 2008, and in 2010 she became a member of Shiritsu Ebisu Chugaku. Following her departure from the group in 2011, she became a member of various idol groups and bands. After starting a voice acting career, she was cast as Yu Takasaki in Love Live! Nijigasaki High School Idol Club in 2020. She is also known for her roles as Momoe Sawaki in Wonder Egg Priority, Suzune Miyama in Selection Project, and Kitasan Black in Umamusume: Pretty Derby.

== Biography ==
Yano was born in Hyōgo Prefecture on March 5, 1997. She began her activities as an idol in 2008 when she became a member of the group Piecees. The following year, she became a member of the group Momonaki. In 2010, she became a member of Shiritsu Ebisu Chugaku, before leaving the group in 2011.

Following her departure from Shiritsu Ebisu Chugaku, Yano moved to Sony Music Artists and began using the stage name Hinaki Tsukikage. She became involved in various groups and activities, such as being a member of the anime collaboration cafe Shirobaco and serving as lead vocalist of the band Dusty Fruits Club. She also started a voice acting career, appearing in a number of video games and foreign dubs. In 2020, she was cast in her first major anime role as Yu Takasaki in Love Live! Nijigasaki High School Idol Club. In 2021, she played the roles of Kitasan Black in the second season of Umamusume: Pretty Derby, Momoe Sawaki in Wonder Egg Priority, and Suzune Miyama in Selection Project. In 2022, Yano was one of the winners of the Best New Actress Award at the 16th Seiyu Awards. In 2025, she played the roles of Akane Sakuramori in I Got Married to the Girl I Hate Most in Class and Tomo Namba in Medaka Kuroiwa Is Impervious to My Charms.

== Filmography ==
=== Anime ===
2019

- The Price of Smiles as Emma

2020

- Love Live! Nijigasaki High School Idol Club as Yu Takasaki

2021

- Umamusume: Pretty Derby 2nd Season as Kitasan Black
- Wonder Egg Priority as Momoe Sawaki
- Selection Project as Suzune Miyama

2022

- Love Live! Nijigasaki High School Idol Club 2nd Season as Yu Takasaki

2023

- Kizuna no Allele as Halle
- Umamusume: Pretty Derby 3rd Season as Kitasan Black

2024

- A Salad Bowl of Eccentrics as Sara Da Odin
- Quality Assurance in Another World as Nikola
- The Elusive Samurai as Shizuku

2025

- I Got Married to the Girl I Hate Most in Class as Akane Sakuramori
- I'm a Behemoth, an S-Ranked Monster, but Mistaken for a Cat, I Live as an Elf Girl's Pet as Aria
- Medaka Kuroiwa Is Impervious to My Charms as Tomo Namba
- I'm Living with an Otaku NEET Kunoichi!? as Shizuri Ideura
- From Old Country Bumpkin to Master Swordsman as Ficelle Harbeller
- Watari-kun's ****** Is About to Collapse as Suzushiro Watari
- Alma-chan Wants to Be a Family! as Neon

=== Video games ===
2021

- Umamusume: Pretty Derby as Kitasan Black

2022

- Dolphin Wave as Iruka Sakimiya

2023

- Love Live! School Idol Festival 2: Miracle Live! as Yu Takasaki

2026

- Petit Planet as Yunguo

=== Other ===
2023

- Omae Imouto Janakute Iinazuke Datta no kayo!? as Kana Shiina
