= List of Kaguya-sama: Love Is War characters =

The Kaguya-sama: Love Is War manga series features an extensive cast of characters created by Aka Akasaka. The story takes place in senior high of Shuchiin Academy, and follows the student council president Miyuki Shirogane and vice-president Kaguya Shinomiya as they come with many schemes to make the other confess their love due to both of them being too proud to do so. Other significant characters include the student council secretary Chika Fujiwara, student council treasurer Yu Ishigami, student council auditor Miko Iino, Kaguya's personal assistant and childhood friend Ai Hayasaka, as well as many others.

== Main characters ==
=== Kaguya Shinomiya ===
Voiced by: Aoi Koga (Japanese); Alexis Tipton (English)
Portrayed by: Kanna Hashimoto

The title character of the series, Kaguya Shinomiya (四宮 かぐや, Shinomiya Kaguya) is the vice president of Shuchiin Academy's student council. She is known for her beauty, intelligence and wealth, her family owning one of the largest business conglomerates in Japan.^{Ch. 1} Due to being born into a high-class family, the manner Kaguya was raised caused her to be prideful, cold and calculating; but underneath her personality traits, she is really an innocent, kind and fair-minded teenage girl at heart. Her social status and upbringing also causes her emotional suffering due to loneliness and isolation. In spite of her intelligence and resources, she is surprisingly inept at utilizing social media and digital technology (although she excels at older, analog methods of input such as typewriter). She is also quite naïve when it comes to romance and sexuality, and had to be taught how to utilize fashion and femininity to her advantage. To make Miyuki confess his love directly or indirectly, she usually plans ahead to tilt the circumstances in her favour. Apart from engaging in student council work, she is in the Archery club.^{Ch. 28}

It is revealed later in the story that Kaguya was born out of an affair by her father and a prostitute named Nayotake Shimizu, who died less than a month after giving birth to her ^{Ch. 254}, and as of such wouldn't be considered part of the family going by tradition. Despite her father still considering her as much of a member of his family as the rest of his children, she is still treated akin to a political tool by her two oldest brothers.^{Ch. 249}

Akasaka said that he modeled Kaguya to be like Kaguya-hime in that both are princesses at the start, but have something deeper about their character later. He made both Kaguya and Miyuki to have similar personalities at first, both proud and intellectual but later revealing to be more like "goofy idiots" on the inside. He would later have the two diverge in tendencies, with Kaguya being more like a "bad girl". Akasaka also said that while Kaguya has a dark side to her, he didn't want people to hate her so he tries to keep the positive and negative emotions balanced.

=== Miyuki Shirogane ===
Voiced by: Makoto Furukawa (Japanese); Aaron Dismuke, Clifford Chapin (season 3) (English)
Portrayed by: Sho Hirano

Miyuki Shirogane (白銀 御行, Shirogane Miyuki) is the student council president of Shuchiin Academy.^{Ch. 1} He is famed for being the top student of the school who has also placed second overall in national mock exams, attributed to his studying all the time, hence his messy hair, dark circles around his eyes, and glaring look.^{Ch. 4} Like Kaguya, he is inexperienced with romance and relationships. Miyuki struggles with physical sports involving skills and has a paralyzing fear of bugs, especially cockroaches.^{Ch. 7, 15} Because his father, formerly a factory owner, ^{Ch. 83} is unemployed and his mother – who left the family when he was a child – does not support them, he and his younger sister Kei often take part-time jobs.^{Ch. 34, 52, 83} A running gag in the series is how he always imagines Kaguya looking down on him and saying "How cute." (お可愛いこと, Okawaii koto), and refrains to confess his feelings for her in fear of being rejected in such way. (Note: Kaguya also sometimes imagines Miyuki looking down at her saying "How cute.") Miyuki also has a passion for stargazing ^{Ch. 56}, and dreams of one day becoming a professional astronomer. He also enjoys traditional folk tales, and believed that if he were in the Emperor's position in the Kaguya-hime story, he would have tried stealing the princess back, which mirrors his actions in the final act of the story.^{Ch. 249}

Akasaka said that he initially thought about naming him Mikado, after the Emperor in the Kaguya-hime story, but found that he liked Otomo no Miyuki better. He developed Miyuki to begin like a twin in personality and character to Kaguya, and would later diverge to a "good boy". He likes that he can portray him as calm and composed on the outside, but his mind would be racing on the inside.

=== Chika Fujiwara ===
Voiced by: Konomi Kohara (Japanese); Jad Saxton (English)
Portrayed by: Nana Asakawa

Chika Fujiwara (藤原 千花, Fujiwara Chika) is the student council secretary of Shuchiin Academy. Chika is a fair-skinned young girl with shoulder-length silver hair (light pink in the anime) that has a black bow in the middle of her square bangs, blue eyes and she has a large chest size. She has been friends with Kaguya Shinomiya since middle school, however, their closeness isn't obvious to others because of Kaguya's personality. Despite being skilled in languages, singing and various sports, she's often portrayed as being an airhead who doesn't take academic schoolwork seriously compared to her peers, and whilst she claims to be an expert on reading emotions, the accuracy of said reads tends to be rather hit-or-miss; for example, she is able to tell that Miko harbours feelings for Yu despite her antagonistic attitude towards him, ^{Ch. 226} whilst also being the only member of the student council who didn't figure out that Kaguya and Miyuki had started dating each other. ^{Ch. 223} This lack of social awareness when it comes to Kaguya and Miyuki's relationship fuels many of the conflicts in the two's games of love, such as marrying Miyuki in The Game of Life ^{Ch. 53} and also eating from his lunch. ^{Ch. 5} Despite this, she does her best to help cheer up her fellow student council members and is usually the first person to offer emotional support.

=== Yu Ishigami ===
Voiced by: Ryōta Suzuki (Japanese); Austin Tindle (English)
Portrayed by: Hayato Sano

Yu Ishigami (石上 優, Ishigami Yū) is Shuchiin Academy's student council treasurer and an underclassman to the other members.^{Ch. 24} He is a dark-haired boy with an emo-looking haircut with bangs covering one of his eyes. The second son of a small toy manufacturer, he only attended school because his father forced him to, and was a truant until Miyuki recruited him to be treasurer. He usually keeps to himself and wears headphones while playing video games on his portable game console, however, he is a keen observer of people, noticing things that other do not wish to reveal, but occasionally getting in trouble for pointing out those things.^{Ch. 28, profile} He is afraid Kaguya might kill him because she tends to give him threatening glares and comments.^{Vol. 3} Chika will also occasionally beat him up for making inappropriate comments.^{Vol. 3}

As the story goes on, Yu becomes more open with the council, particularly with Kaguya who begins to enjoy his presence as a junior, as he's shown to be very honest and sincere of others to the point where he will damage his own reputation in order to save others from being hurt. A background story reveals that in junior high, he tried to protect a classmate from her potentially abusive boyfriend, but got suspended and was then shunned by her and his classmates. Miyuki and the student council discover and support him. Yu eventually overcomes his trauma, and is able to move on.^{Ch. 85-90} He starts to like Tsubame, his senior and the vice-captain of the cheer squad that he had randomly joined.^{Ch. 104} During the school festival, he casually gives Tsubame a heart-shaped gift, but is unaware that it symbolized that he was confessing to her. Although he is rejected, he resolves to better himself so that she can come to like him.^{Ch. 155–156}

Yu ends up going on several dates with Tsubame, though she breaks up with him on her graduation day due to being both unsure how to date a man who is younger than she is and because she loved him platonically as opposed to romantically.^{Ch. 203-204} This depresses Yu, who remains heartbroken for a long period of time, but starts to feel happier when he realises he's developing feelings for Miko.^{Ch. 227, 230} He and Maki then develop a friendship over their mutual struggles in romance, with Yu eventually helping Maki move on from her crush on Tsubasa.^{Ch. 238, 274}

Upon Miko's becoming elected as the new school president, he is asked by her to take on the role of vice president, placing the two of them in a near-identical situation to Kaguya and Shirogane at the start of the manga.^{Ch. 278}

Akasaka said that he designed Yu's character as to not interfere with the relationship among Kaguya, Miyuki and Chika. He describes Yu as taciturn and has little presence, and can come and go at any time, which has become useful as a recurring gag. When asked whether he resembles any of his characters, he said that he is also like Yu in that he has some negative thoughts, and that in high school he also had a crush on a senior girl.

=== Ai Hayasaka ===
Voiced by: Yumiri Hanamori (Japanese); AmaLee (English)
Portrayed by: Mayu Hotta

Ai Hayasaka (早坂 愛, Hayasaka Ai) is Kaguya's personal assistant and childhood friend; her father is Kaguya's godfather, and her mother was Kaguya's wet-nurse. The two girls were raised together until the age of two, when Kaguya was moved to the Shinomiya main house; on their reunion aged seven, their official master/servant relationship was established.^{Vol. 2, Ch. 29 profile} Her family has been serving the Shinomiyas for generations; once prominent and rivaling the Shinomiyas, they were subsequently absorbed into the Shinomiya family in recognition of their fine bloodline.^{Ch. 19} She has short strawberry blond hair and is one-quarter Irish.^{Ch. 29 profile} At school, she acts like a popular fashionable girl who wears her skirt short, a loose collar, fancy nails, and accessories, all of which push the dress code.^{Ch. 25, 29} She keeps her association with Kaguya a secret from Miyuki and Chika. When Miyuki visits, she dresses as a maid named Smirka A. Haski (スミシー・A・ハーサカ, Sumishī A Hāsaka; anime: Smithee A. Herthaka),^{Ch. 35,}^{Ep. 9} who attends an all-girls school and who flirts with Miyuki.^{Ch. 58} When Chika visits, she cross-dresses as male butler Mr. Haski.^{Ch. 106}^{Ep. 28} Ai is more socially aware than Kaguya, and can be calculative at times, but is also very sensitive as she too longs for a normal high school life and a boyfriend, which results in her teasing Kaguya frequently.^{Ch. 42} She eventually tells Miyuki who she really is and becomes his friend, while teasing Kaguya that friendship is the first step to a relationship.^{Ch. 106–108} She later resigns from her position as assistant, revealing that she had been working for Kaguya's brother all these years to keep tabs on Kaguya. When Kaguya forgives her, she returns to the school and they can now interact as equals.^{Ch. 179–187}

Akasaka said that he designed Ai's character with the intent of having her become friends with Miyuki from the beginning. He said that she is mysterious and that he might bring out her "true personality" later. (Note: At the time of Akasaka's Livedoor News interview, Kaguya-sama was running before chapter 173, prior to Ai's story line) She was not intended to be a heroine, although some of the readers think of her as such.

=== Miko Iino ===
Voiced by: Miyu Tomita (Japanese); Madeleine Morris (English)
Portrayed by: Yūka Kageyama

Miko Iino (伊井野 ミコ, Iino Miko) (Note: Her surname is written as "Ino" in the English manga releases.) is a first-year student and a classmate of Yu. A member of the disciplinary committee, she first appears at the end of Miyuki's first student council term, where she runs as a competing candidate for the next student council president. She wishes to impose more orderly and proper behavior on the students, with rules such as making guys have crew cuts, having girls wear long skirts, and forbidding relationships. Despite being outspoken and strongly opinionated, she is very shy and fearful of public speaking. She is only able to speak her mind at the candidate speeches when Miyuki changes the situation into a one-on-one conversation and debate. Although she loses the election, she gets a sizable number of votes; her peers, who had made fun of her previous pathetic turnouts, begin to respect and admire her. She then joins the student council as the financial auditor while remaining on the disciplinary committee.^{Vol. 7} Later on, her authoritarian nature loosens up more as she realises that not only does she need to view things from other peoples' perspectives, but also that her methods are too forceful.^{Ch. 233}

Miko's sense of justice runs through her family: her father is a high court judge and her mother works for an international humanitarian aid organization. Academically she is at the top of her class and admires Chika for her music skills as a pianist, but loathes Yu for being lazy and not taking schoolwork seriously. She used to think of Miyuki and Kaguya as a massive playboy and sadistically evil respectively, as she has often caught them in inappropriate romantic situations.^{Vol. 7-8} She supported Yu in his pursuit of Tsubame as a girlfriend, but realizes she has harbored feelings for him.^{Ch. 190}

Miko later went on to run council president, managing to overcome the nervousness that ruined her speech in the prior election, whilst also letting go of her old nature and instead prioritising the desires of those around her.^{Ch. 275} As president, she focuses on recruiting people into the council who could effectively implement ideas from both the prior student council, as well as their own ideas.^{Ch. 278}

Akasaka designed Miko to have a contrasting personality as well where she first appears as a serious Discipline Committee member, but is inwardly lewd; or a serious honor student but who lets her guard down too easily when a boy is nice to her. Miko was also useful as a punch line to close off a chapter where she would run into the student council room and remark on the embarrassing situation.

== Supporting characters ==
=== Shuchiin Academy ===
==== Nagisa Kashiwagi ====
Voiced by: Momo Asakura (Japanese); Bryn Apprill (English)
Portrayed by: Natsumi Ikema

Nagisa Kashiwagi (柏木 渚, Kashiwagi Nagisa) is a classmate who occasionally asks Kaguya about what to do in her relationships.^{Ch. 16, 48} She has short dark hair and wears a double-banded barrette on one side. Early in the series, she is confessed to by a classmate, and ends up accepting.^{Ch. 6} The daughter in a wealthy shipbuilding family,^{Ch. 49} she academically ranks in the top ten of the class^{Ch. 30} and heads the school's Volunteering club.^{Ch. 16, 51} She later observes that perhaps Kaguya and Miyuki do like each other.^{Ch. 51} Nagisa exhibits many girlfriend behaviors such as talking a lot, being moody, or even jealousy to the point where she hires a private detective to spy on her boyfriend to see if he is having an affair, later making up with him by being very physically bold and passionate.^{Ch. 76, 97} Whilst she initially starts asking Kaguya for relationship advice, in later chapters the two's roles reverse as she speaks from her experience of being sexually active.^{Vol. 14}

She breaks up with Tsubasa near the end of the story after hearing Maki had been in love with him for 7 years,^{Ch. 273} however Maki convinces her to get back together with him after sensing that she's still in love with him. After seeing Tsubasa again, she passes out, with a visit at the hospital Tsubasa's grandfather works at confirming that she's 3 months pregnant.^{Ch. 274}

==== Tsubasa Tanuma / Kashiwagi's boyfriend ====
Voiced by: Taku Yashiro (Japanese); Brandon McInnis (English)
Portrayed by: Yūtarō

Tsubasa Tanuma (田沼 翼, Tanuma Tsubasa)^{Ch. 109, 180} (Note: In chapter 109, the council members remark: "So his name is Tsubasa, huh?" "I've always referred to him as Kashiwagi's boyfriend" "We had to wait 104 chapters to find out what his name is"), initially known merely as Kashiwagi's boyfriend (柏木の彼氏, Kashiwagi no kareshi), is a classmate who regularly asks Miyuki for love advice near the beginning of the series. When Miyuki recommends he boldly confess to Kashiwagi, he does so, and they become a couple.^{Ch. 6} He is the son of a hospital director, as well as the grandson of the Shinomiya family physician.^{Ch. 49, 79} Tsubasa's grandfather in particular believes his family is cursed, as both him and his son (Tsubasa's father) became parents when they were 17.^{Ch. 147} His cluelessness about sharing details about his successful relationship annoys the council members.^{Ch. 48, 76}

==== Kei Shirogane ====
Voiced by: Sayumi Suzushiro (Japanese); Heather Walker (English)

Kei Shirogane (白銀 圭, Shirogane Kei) is Miyuki's younger sister who is the student council treasurer in the junior high of Shuchiin. Kaguya admires her because she is much like her brother as she is fairly serious; that being with her is like being with Miyuki.^{Ch. 39, 52} After her parents separated when she was young, she initially stayed with her mother but ran away to live with her father and brother. ^{Ch. 208} She is rebellious when it comes to interacting with her brother, finding him to be annoying and not fashionable,^{Ep. 39, 52, 83} but still cares for him and ensures that he presents a good image when he is in front of her classmates. She is good friends with the Fujiwaras, both her classmate Moeha, and Chika. Despite not interacting with Kaguya much, Kei tries to get to know Kaguya better and is happy when she makes little breakthroughs.^{Ch. 52} Upon finding out that her brother and Kaguya are dating, she is more than eager to help him out as it would mean that not only would she hang out with her more often, but the two of them would become relatives.^{Ch. 83}

==== Moeha Fujiwara ====
Voiced by: Ari Ozawa (Japanese); Kara Edwards (English)

Moeha Fujiwara (藤原 萌葉, Fujiwara Moeha) is Chika's little sister who is the student council vice-president in junior high of Shuchiin and a classmate and friend of Kei.^{Ch. 39, 52} She admires Miyuki as well and hopes to confess to him someday.^{Ch. 52, 126} She has a habit of voicing dark ideas, which unnerve Kaguya a great deal.^{Ch. 52}

==== Maki Shijo ====
Voiced by: Kana Ichinose (Japanese); Hope Endrenyi (English)

Maki Shijo (四条 眞妃, Shijō Maki) is a classmate and best friend of Nagisa. She has short hair styled in short pigtails. She is friends with Nagisa and is secretly jealous of Nagisa's relationship with her boyfriend, as she too liked him, but could not confess before.^{Ch. 61, 98} A running gag early in the series is that she appears in the after-chapter panels seemingly stalking the two with a distraught look on her face.

As a branch member of the Shinomiya clan, she is Kaguya's second cousin twice removed (Note: Kaguya is Maki's grandparent's second cousin.^{Ch. 98}) so she sometimes refers to Kaguya as "Auntie," much to Kaguya's displeasure. Their coldness towards each other is suggested to be due to tensions between the main family and branch families.^{Ch. 98} Yu considers her tsundere (cold on the outside but wanting to be affectionate), and Miyuki thinks she is very similar to Kaguya in personality.^{Ch. 98} She declares Yu and Miyuki as her friends, due to their support in helping her process her failed romance, much to Kaguya's horror (since it would mean that Miyuki has another potential romance rival).^{Ch. 98, 109} However, over time, Kaguya and Maki's relationship is shown to improve slightly.

==== Kobachi Osaragi ====
Voiced by: Rina Hidaka (Japanese); Leah Clark (English)

Kobachi Osaragi (大仏 こばち, Osaragi Kobachi) is Miko's classmate with the glasses and a member of the disciplinary committee.^{Ch. 85} She has been looking after Miko for over ten years, in a very literal sense due to Miko's gullible nature.^{Ch. 103} She later starts to date the Captain of the Cheer Club, but eventually separates from them.^{Ch. 122} Her parents were television celebrities, and she was on her way to becoming a child star until scandal hit her family, and thus she has kept a low profile since middle school.^{Ch. 192} In later chapters, she reveals to Kaguya that she has been suppressing her own romantic feelings towards Yu in order to support Miko but lets it slip that she might only be nominal friends with her.^{Ch. 231-232}

==== Tsubame Koyasu ====
Voiced by: Haruka Fukuhara (Japanese); Tia Ballard (English)
Portrayed by: Haruka Fukuhara

Tsubame Koyasu (子安 つばめ, Koyasu Tsubame) is a popular third-year student who is vice-captain of the cheer squad and a rhythmic gymnast.^{Ch. 82, 116} She is daughter of a restaurateur and bartender.^{Ch. 154} She encourages Yu to participate and enjoy himself,^{Ch. 90, 104} but is shocked when Yu inadvertently and publicly confesses to her during the school festival. After talking with Kaguya, she tells Yu she will provide a response to him at a time of his choosing, despite Yu still being unaware he confessed in the first place.^{Ch. 130} At her Christmas party, she offers her body to Yu, but is refused when Yu realizes she is only doing so out of pity rather than genuine affection. She continues to support Yu as he vows to improve himself for her,^{Ch. 156} and really likes the love advice from a certain fortune teller (Miyuki's father).^{Ch. 160} She and Yu go on some dates,^{Ch. 176} but by the time of her graduation, she ends the romance part and just wants to remain friends. She makes it up to him by orchestrating a school-wide rumor that dispels the false accusation that has plagued him since middle school.^{Ch. 201-204} The two have maintained a happy, yet awkward, friendship.

Akasaka has shared that he liked a senior girl when he was in high school as well. That she was graduating would also make for an interesting storyline for Yu.

==== Karen Kino and Erika Kose ====
Karen voiced by: Madoka Asahina (Japanese); Lindsay Seidel (English)
Erika voiced by: Ayaka Asai (Japanese); Kristen McGuire (English)

Karen Kino (紀 かれん, Kino Karen) and Erika Kose (巨瀬 エリカ, Kose Erika) are Kaguya's schoolmates in the mass media club who are the subject of the spinoff series Kaguya-sama o Kataritai. They idolize the student council but have no real clue what they do. Karen has light brown straight hair and is the daughter of the CEO of a major publishing company; She spends a great deal of time fantasizing about Miyuki and Kaguya along with writing fan fiction manga about them, which she has only shown to a few select people.^{Ch. 12} Erika has black hair styled in a ponytail and the daughter of a family that makes miso.^{Ch. 15} Erika's obsession is completely focused on Kaguya.

=== Others ===
==== Miyuki and Kei Shirogane's father ====
Voiced by: Takehito Koyasu (Japanese); Tyson Rineheart (English)
Portrayed by: Masahiro Takashima

"Papa Shirogane" (白銀 父, Shirogane Chichi) is the father of Miyuki and Kei. After his wife left him seven years prior due to his factory's shutdown, he spends most of his time unemployed.^{Ch. 83} He does random activities such as fortune-telling and giving advice.^{Ch. 111} He later parlays that into a successful livestreamer, to the shock of both his children.^{Ch. 191} It is later revealed that his factory's sudden turn in fortune was due to meddling from older members in the Shinomiya group, though he does not carry any grudges with Kaguya and encourages her and Miyuki to enjoy their relationship ^{Ch. 208-209}.

==== Un'yo Shinomiya ====
Un'yo Shinomiya (四宮 雲鷹, Shinomiya Un'yō) is the third son of Gan'an Shinomiya, the only child of his second wife and elder half-brother to Kaguya. As he and Kaguya aren't the children of Gan'an's first wife, they hold less power within the company, leading to him growing overprotective of his younger sister ^{Ch. 242}. His cold, sharp demeanour, intimidation tactics and hatred towards traitors created Kaguya's initial, icy personality. Despite this, he always has the best intentions for his younger sister, such as hunting down Ai when he discovered she was relaying information to his eldest sibling Oko, whilst respecting Kaguya's choice to forgive her. ^{Ch. 184-186} In addition, he also helps ensure that Miyuki is well protected during the Shinomiya-Shijo conflict, as he knows how he'd be a threat to Kaguya's marriage to Mikado.^{Ch. 242}

==== Oko Shinomiya ====
Oko Shinomiya (四宮 黄光, Shinomiya Okō) is the eldest child of Gan'an Shinomiya and the heir to the Shinomiya Group. Shown to be crude and manipulative, he is the most power-hungry member of the Shinomiya group, having been raised with the promise that he'd inherit his father's conglomerate. He goes out of his way to interfere with his siblings' lives, such as taking advantage of Ai when she was young and using her friendship with Kaguya to spy on her, and also discouraging her from seeking a higher education so she could live her life as a housewife. He holds feudalistic beliefs on society, namely that women only serve as political tools that marry rival groups to ensure alliances.^{Ch. 209} However, these beliefs were likely formed to cope with his father's mistreatment of him, as he himself was married off to a more powerful woman, which forced him to break up with his high school girlfriend.^{Ch. 249} Oko later reveals that his desire to marry Kaguya off, as well as to run the company is because he fears a company war with the Shijo Group would lead to most people under the Shinomiya umbrella to lose their jobs, likely driving many of them to commit suicide. In the end, Kaguya makes a deal with Oko; he must cancel the arranged marriage and leave her friends alone, and in return, Kaguya won't interfere with the Shinomiya Group's office politics.^{Ch. 259}

==== Mikado Shijo ====
Voiced by: Seiichiro Yamashita (Japanese); Alejandro Arias (English)

Mikado Shijo (四条 帝, Shijō Mikado) is the younger twin brother of Maki Shijo, Kaguya's second cousin twice removed, and heir to the Shijo Group. Initially presented as a rival to Miyuki for Kaguya's affection, he backs down almost immediately once he realises that the two of them are happy together, and he and Miyuki become close friends.^{Ch. 211-212} When the Shinomiya Group and Shijo Group start discussing plans to end their rivalry, they settle on marrying Kaguya off to him. Whilst he accepts the offering in order to appease the Shinomiya group, both he and his sister plan to figure out a way to still ensure that Kaguya and Miyuki end up together, though should all else fails he still intends on marrying Kaguya in order to prevent corporate warfare between the Shijo and Shinomiya groups.^{Ch. 251} He is named after the Emperor from The Tale of the Bamboo Cutter, who was the love interest of Kaguya's namesake, reflecting how the Shinomiyas view their arranged marriage as a fairy tale ending.

==== Gan'an Shinomiya ====
Gan'an Shinomiya (四宮 雁庵, Shinomiya Gan'an) is the patriarch of the Shinomiya Group. He adopted a cold and unforgiving nature at a young age to build up the company he created, but it ended up consuming his personality as a whole. This led to him becoming absent within his children's lives, as he'd often leave to go on lengthy business trips to help expand the company, as well as teaching his children to view marriages and friendships as nothing more than business deals. However, by the time he physically appears in the series, he is already on his deathbed and can't even recognise his own children due to suffering from a stroke, which lead him to develop vascular dementia, often mistaking Un'yo for Oko and calling Kaguya by her late mother's name. Whilst not to the extent of Oko, it's shown that he developed rather lecherous views on women, as he cheated on his wife with a prostitute who later gave birth to Kaguya.^{Ch. 242} Despite this, everything he did was in order to ensure his family are able to live successful lives, and he cares deeply for all his children. This familial honour reaches the extent that even though it's possible he's not even her father, he still considers Kaguya to be his daughter and regrets how harshly he treated his children.^{Ch. 249} He passes away shortly after his children resolve their dispute around who inherits his company.^{Ch. 268}
