= Kaguya-sama: Love Is War (film) =

- Theatrical release poster
- Kanji: かぐや様は告らせたい ～天才たちの恋愛頭脳～
- Revised Hepburn: Kaguya-sama wa Kokurasetai - Tensai-tachi no Ren'ai Zunōsen
- Directed by: Hayato Kawai
- Written by: Yūichi Tokunaga
- Based on: Kaguya-sama: Love Is War by Aka Akasaka
- Starring: Sho Hirano; Kanna Hashimoto
- Music by: Koji Endo
- Production companies: Twins Japan; Asmik Ace; Toho Pictures
- Distributed by: Toho
- Release date: September 6, 2019
- Running time: 120 minutes
- Country: Japan
- Language: Japanese
- Box office: ¥2 billion ($18.44 million)

Kaguya-sama: Love Is War (Japanese: かぐや様は告らせたい ～天才たちの恋愛頭脳戦～, Hepburn: Kaguya-sama wa Kokurasetai - Tensai-tachi no Ren'ai Zunōsen) is a 2019 Japanese film adaptation of a manga series of the same name by Aka Akasaka. It is directed by Hayato Kawai, distributed by Toho. On February 21, 2019, Shueisha announced that a live-action film adaptation for the series is in production. The film was premiered in Japan on September 6, 2019. Sho Hirano was announced for the role of Miyuki Shirogane, and Kanna Hashimoto was announced for the role of Kaguya Shinomiya. Hayato Kawai directed the film, Yūichi Tokunaga wrote the screenplay, and principal photography was conducted for March to April 2019. The teaser visual poster was unveiled on May 3, 2019.

== Plot ==
In the senior high school division of Shuchiin Academy, student council president Miyuki Shirogane and vice president Kaguya Shinomiya appear to be a perfect match. Kaguya is the daughter of a wealthy conglomerate family, and Miyuki is the top student at the school and well known across the prefecture. Although they like each other, they are too proud to confess their love, as they believe whoever does so first would lose. The story follows their many schemes to make the other one confess or at least show signs of affection.

== Cast ==
- Kanna Hashimoto as Kaguya Shinomiya
- Sho Hirano as Miyuki Shirogane
- Nana Asakawa as Chika Fujiwara
- Hayato Sano as Yū Ishigami
- Mayu Hotta as Ai Hayasaka
- Natsumi Ikema as Nagisa Kashiwagi
- Yūtarō as Tsubasa
- Masahiro Takashima as Miyuki's father
- Jiro Sato as Shōzō Tanuma, narrator
- Aoi Koga as Cinema Counter Girl
- Amu Fukao as Kei Shirogane

== Sequel ==
A sequel titled Kaguya-sama Final: Love Is War (かぐや様は告らせたい ～天才たちの恋愛頭脳戦～ ファイナル, Kaguya-sama wa Kokurasetai - Tensai-tachi no Ren'ai Zunōsen Final) was released in theaters on August 20, 2021.
