= Chika Fujiwara =

Fictional character from Kaguya-sama: Love Is War

- Kaguya-sama: Love Is War character
- Chika as she appears in the anime
- First appearance: Kaguya-sama: Love Is War chapter 1: "I Will Make You Invite Me to a Movie", 19 May 2015
- Created by: Aka Akasaka
- Portrayed by: Nana Asakawa
- Voiced by: Japanese: Konomi Kohara; English: Jad Saxton

In-universe information
- Position: Student council secretary
- Affiliation: Shuchiin Academy
- Family: Daichi Fujiwara (father); Maho Fujiwara (mother); Toyomi Fujiwara (older sister); Moeha Fujiwara (younger sister)

Chika Fujiwara (Japanese: 藤原 千花, Hepburn: Fujiwara Chika) is a fictional character in the manga series Kaguya-sama: Love Is War, created by Aka Akasaka. Depicted in the story as coming from a prestigious family of politicians, Chika is the student council secretary of Shuchiin Academy, where she works closely with her fellow student council members, vice president Kaguya Shinomiya and president Miyuki Shirogane. Due to her innocent and cheerful attitude, Chika seems to be completely unaware to the psychological "battles" that occur between Kaguya and Miyuki as they constantly try to get each other to confess their love.

In the anime adaptation, Chika is voiced by Konomi Kohara in Japanese and Jad Saxton in the English version. In the live action films Kaguya-sama: Love Is War and its sequel Kaguya-sama: Love Is War 2, she is portrayed by Japanese actress and former singer Nana Asakawa. Chika is considered one of the most popular characters of Kaguya-sama: Love Is War and her personality has been well received by both fans and critics.

== Creation and conception ==
In February 2020, Aka Akasaka, the author of Kaguya-sama: Love Is War, said in an interview that Chika's role in the manga is mainly to serve as a foil to Kaguya Shinomiya and Miyuki Shirogane, popping up when the two of them are in the middle of their scheming and then she sows chaos through her silliness, in addition to stating that the relationships between Chika, Miyuki and Kaguya basically drive the plot. Also, Akasaka was asked why Chika has no monologues and he replied, "Fujiwara is exactly who she is. She doesn't harbor any darkness. The fact that she doesn't have monologues was just an early idea of mine; at the time, I felt it was better to leave a little mystery somewhere. But now that the series has run for so long, that's not really necessary anymore. I draw Fujiwara like she's everyone's heroine. Please feel free to like her." A month earlier, during another interview, when asked about whether he resembles any of his characters, Akasaka said that he is like Chika in that he loves board games, and that he feels like her and has her personality when friends and family visit.

== Appearances ==
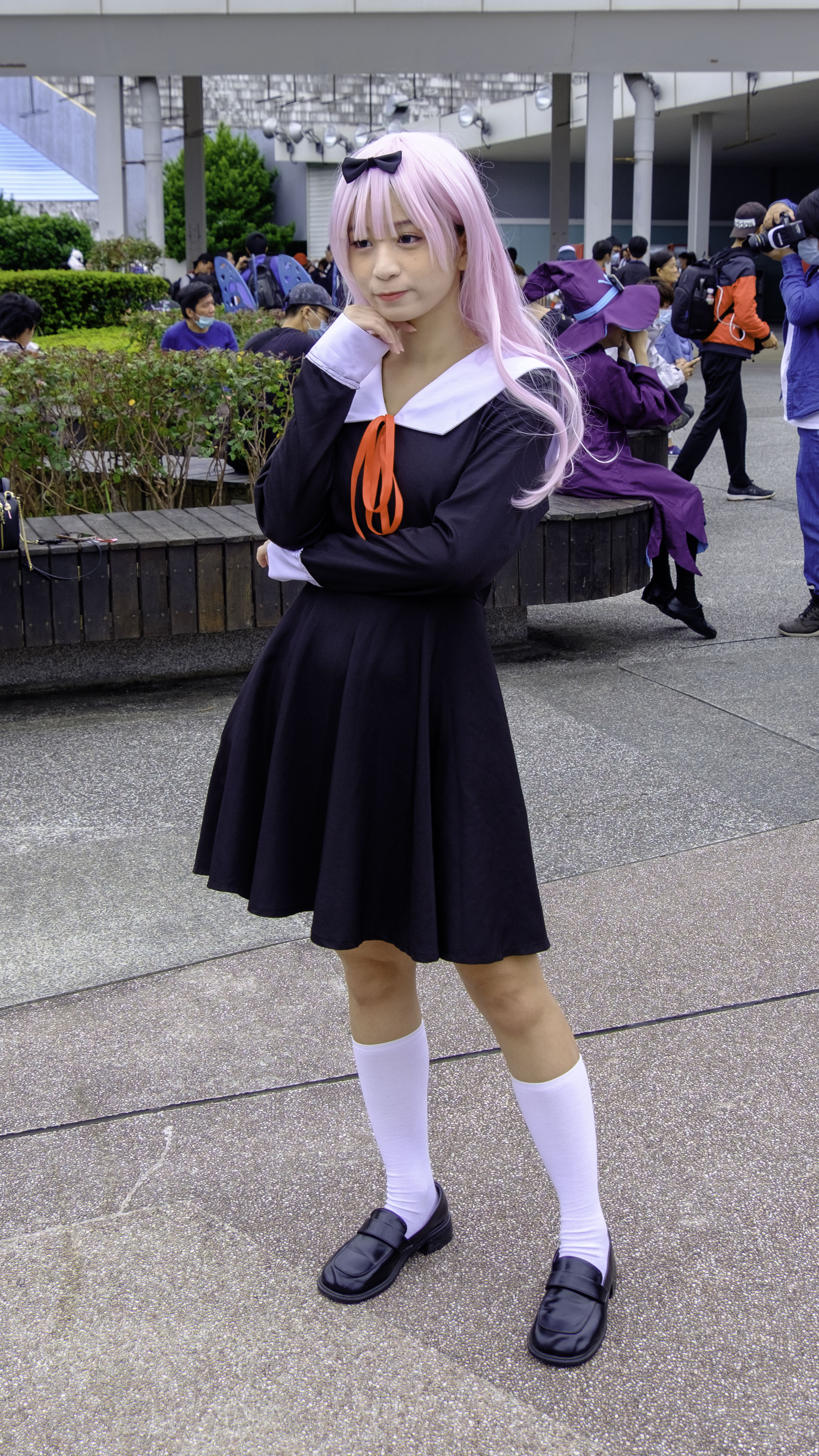
A cosplayer dressed as Chika

In Kaguya-sama: Love Is War manga, Chika Fujiwara is the student council secretary of Shuchiin Academy. Chika is a fair-skinned young girl with shoulder-length silver hair (light pink in the anime) that has a black bow in the middle of her square bangs, blue eyes and she has a large chest size. Chika comes from a family of politicians: her great grandfather was once the Prime Minister of Japan, her uncle is the current Minister of the Right and her mother is a diplomat, making her lineage one of extreme prestige. Also, Chika has an older sister named Toyomi and a younger sister named Moeha. While her family is overprotective of her, she was raised in a loving environment and has grown into a truly kind girl. However, since forms of recreation such as video games and otherworldly items were forbidden to her, she sought other means of escape and has developed many deep and unusual hobbies. She is fond of German analog games, puzzles, and various other subcultures far removed from what one would consider mainstream. She hates lying, but when playing games such as poker, she reveals a hidden side of herself and bluffs like there's no tomorrow. She has been friends with Kaguya since middle school, however, their closeness isn't obvious to others because of Kaguya's personality.

Chika is a bubbly eccentric girl who almost always has a smile on her face. Always looking to have fun with her fellow student council members, she is often the one to come up with strange activities and ideas that entertain herself and the others. She is mostly oblivious to the atmosphere of the room, resulting in her being an unpredictable element that ruins many of Kaguya's and Miyuki's schemes to make the other confess. Because of her lax attitude and childish antics, many of the council members seem to view her as simple-minded, especially Kaguya. Ironically, Chika is actually quite talented in a variety of areas, being an accomplished pianist and also speaking five languages. There are several stories where Chika has intensively coached Miyuki in skills that he lacks, such as volleyball, singing, overcoming squeamishness, and traditional dancing. After each session, she vows not to teach him anymore, but succumbs to his pleas that call her a dependable friend or the only one who can help. She can also be quite devious and underhanded, often attempting to cheat in a lot of the games she comes up with, though is exposed every time. Chika is obsessed with anything that has to with love, professing herself as a "love detective" and giving relationship advice to others (despite having never had a boyfriend before). She can be oddly perceptive at times, regarding Yu Ishigami's and Miko Ino's respective feelings, but is simultaneously oblivious to Kaguya and Miyuki's relationship.

=== In adaptations ===
In the anime adaptation of the series, Konomi Kohara voices the character, while Jad Saxton plays her in the English dub. The ending theme song "Chikatto Chika Chika" by Kohara is used only in the third episode of the first season; the song plays while the anime shows a dance performance by Chika. In the 2019 live action film Kaguya-sama: Love Is War and its 2021 sequel Kaguya-sama: Love Is War 2, Chika is played by Japanese actress and former singer Nana Asakawa.

== Reception ==
=== Popularity ===
Chika has become an extremely popular and somewhat of a breakout character in anime and manga fandom. The popularity of Chika's character has made her a frequent subject of cosplay among female fan readers of the Kaguya-sama: Love Is War series. At the 4th Crunchyroll Anime Awards, Chika was nominated for Best Girl. At the seventh edition, Elizabeth Infante was nominated in the Best Voice Artist Performance (Spanish) category for her performance as Chika, but lost to Alejandro Orozco's Gyutaro. A 1/7th scale figure of Chika wearing a bikini was released in 2020 by Crunchyroll.

Japanese manufacturer Good Smile Company released figures of Chika in their Nendoroid and Figma lines.

=== Critical response ===
Reviewing Kaguya-sama: Love Is War, Rebecca Silverman of Anime News Network said that part of the reason the story works is because of Chika, as she both lightens up the mood and tries to act as a good friend and "breath of sanity" for Kaguya and Miyuki. Faiyaz Chowdhury of Comic Book Resources commented that "Chika is the wildcard amidst the various mind games Kaguya and Shirogane attempt on each other in their battle of confession. Her aloof, goofball nature is used to serve as a humorous obstruction to the main characters' daily psychological battles, allowing for the comedy to evolve with layered twists and turns. Depending on the character interacting with her, Chika's character traits are used to produce different effects."

Marianne R. of MANGA.TOKYO praised Chika's character as "worth highlighting", saying she is very intelligent and able to emotionally manipulate Kaguya to make things go her way, which, according to Marianne, makes Chika "awesome yet kind of creepy at the same time". Kambole Campbell of IGN complimented the character's Japanese voice actress Kohara as "excelling in conveying a bubbly hyperactivity".

== See also ==
- List of Kaguya-sama: Love Is War characters
