= Kaguya-sama Final: Love Is War =

- Theatrical release poster
- Kanji: かぐや様は告らせたい ～天才たちの恋愛頭脳戦～ ファイナル
- Revised Hepburn: Kaguya-sama wa Kokurasetai - Tensai-tachi no Ren'ai Zunōsen - Final
- Directed by: Hayato Kawai
- Written by: Yūichi Tokunaga
- Based on: Kaguya-sama: Love Is War by Aka Akasaka
- Starring: Sho Hirano; Kanna Hashimoto; Yūka Kageyama
- Music by: Koji Endo
- Production companies: Twins Japan; Asmik Ace; Toho Pictures
- Distributed by: Toho
- Release date: August 20, 2021
- Running time: 116 minutes
- Country: Japan
- Language: Japanese

Kaguya-sama Final: Love Is War (Japanese: かぐや様は告らせたい ～天才たちの恋愛頭脳戦～ ファイナル, Hepburn: Kaguya-sama wa Kokurasetai - Tensai-tachi no Ren'ai Zunōsen Fainaru) is a 2021 Japanese film. It is the sequel to the first film adaptation of the manga series Kaguya-sama: Love is War.

The film was released in theaters on August 20, 2021, topping the box office for its release weekend.

== Cast ==
- Sho Hirano as Miyuki Shirogane
- Kanna Hashimoto as Kaguya Shinomiya
- Hayato Sano as Yū Ishigami
- Nana Asakawa as Chika Fujiwara
- Mayu Hotta as Ai Hayasaka
- Yūka Kageyama as Miko Iino
- Haruka Fukuhara as Tsubame Koyasu
- Shun'ya Itabashi as Kazeno
- Fumiya Takahashi as Kō Ogino
- Natsumi Ikema as Nagisa Kashiwagi
- Yūtarō as Tsubasa Tanuma
- Masahiro Takashima as Miyuki's father
- Jiro Sato as Shōzō Tanuma
