= Natsumi Ikema =

Japanese actress and model (born 2002)

- 池間 夏海
- Born: July 10, 2002 (age 23); Tomigusuku, Okinawa, Japan
- Occupations: Model; Actress
- Years active: 2009–present
- Agent: Rising Production
- Height: 162 cm (5 ft 4 in)

Natsumi Ikema (池間 夏海, Ikema Natsumi; born July 10, 2002) is a Japanese actress, model, and former child actor who affiliated with Rising Production.

== Early life and career ==
Natsuki Ikema was born on 10 July 2002 in Tomigusuku. When she was 5, her mother, who wanted her to overcome her shyness, recommended that she apply to Color's, a local Okinawa model and stylist agency, in the newspaper, which marked the beginning of her entertainment career.

She began her career as a child actor and model, and in 2013 made her TV debut in Saito-san 2, where she was praised for her acting, with fans calling her a diamond in the rough found in Okinawa. She appeared in locally produced Sentai dramas and local commercials. She learned singing and dancing as one of her hobbies, and was a member of the dance and vocal unit Lollipop until her graduation in March 2018. She was in the same group as Yokota Mirai.

As a child actress she moved to Tokyo for four months when she was in the fifth grade of elementary school and participated in the filming of Saito-san 2, and while in junior high school, she played the lead role in a movie, which sparked her interest in acting. In 2018 she left her parents' home and moved to Tokyo when she entered high school, and began working full-time as an actress.

In March 2018 she was selected to appear in a commercial, Sea Breeze, which has produced such stars as Miki Nakatani, Kyoko Fukada, Maki Horikita, Umika Kawashima, and Suzu Hirose, and is known as the gateway to becoming a breakout actress. She became a hot topic of conversation, and that make she was chosen to appear in a commercial. She also tried her hand at gravure for the first time in Weekly Playboy, and sort after that she made her first appearance in Weekly Young Jump, appearing on the cover and in her first lead photo shoot, showing off her first swimsuit.

She made her acting debut in live action film, Nisekoi. At same time she appearance in morning drama, Natsuzora in early 2019. After booming due Nisekoi, she took part in two live action film of Kaguya-sama: Love Is War and Kaguya-sama Final.

In first half of 2020, she joined morning drama Chimudondon, as a female student at a rival school to the heroine played by Kuroshima Yuina.

In 2023, she appeared in the television series adapted from Diary of Our Days at the Breakwater.

== Filmography ==
=== Film ===
Year	Title	Role	Notes	Ref.
2014	Tamako and the Chochika Spell	Tamako		
2014	Love at the Restaurant Begins		Guest role	
2015	Tamako and the Majimun of Yomukae Bridge	Tamako		
2015	Halsar Acres			
2018	Kitanaka Sketch	Adaniya Azumi		
2018	Nisekoi	Kosaki Onodera		
2019	Okinawan Blue	Ao	Lead role	
2019	Kaguya-sama: Love Is War	Kashiwagi Nagisa		
2020	Tonkatsu DJ Agetarō	Katsumata Koromo		
2021	Kaguya-sama Final: Love Is War	Kashiwagi Nagisa		
2022	Shimamori Tower	Yuki Higa		

=== Television ===
Year	Title	Role	Notes	Ref.
2009	Ryushin Mabuya Gaiden	Yui (young)		
2013	Saito-san	Harima Miyu	Season 2	
2013	Black Cat, Sometimes a Flower Shop	Kiyoka Hinata		
2017	Acres Ground Master	Toji Yu	Lead role	
2019	Natsuzora	Kawatani Yukiko	Asadora	
2019	Sawa-chan Rides the Wave	Sawa Korezawa	Regional drama	
2022	Chimudondon	Hitomi Yara	Asadora	
2022	Tokuso 9	Hayasaka Ranko	Guest Role	
2023	Get Ready	Okada Natsumi	Guest role	
2023	Diary of Our Days at the Breakwater	Hodaka Natsumi		
