= Yell (TV series) =

Japanese television drama

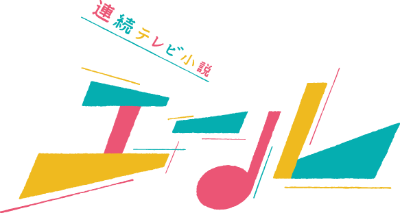
- Original title: エール
- Genre: Drama
- Created by: Kōji Hayashi
- Written by: Yukako Shimizu; Ureha Shimada; Teruyuki Yoshida
- Directed by: Teruyuki Yoshida; Takehiro Matsuzono; Shinichirō Hashizume; Yūta Noguchi
- Starring: Masataka Kubota; Fumi Nikaidō; Aoi Nakamura; Yojiro Noda; Rena Matsui; Naotarō Moriyama; Takara Sakumoto; Nana Mori; Riisa Naka; Tooru Nomaguchi; Takahiro Miura; Mayu Hotta; Yūta Furukawa; Arata Furuta; Ken Mitsuishi; Momoko Kikuchi; Ken Shimura; Hiroko Yakushimaru; Ko Shibasaki; Morio Kazama; Toshiaki Karasawa
- Narrated by: Kenjiro Tsuda
- Opening theme: "Hoshikage no Yell" by GReeeeN
- Composer: Eishi Segawa
- Country of origin: Japan
- Original language: Japanese
- No. of episodes: 120

Production
- Executive producer: Katsuhiro Tsuchiya
- Producers: Chieko Konishi; Yasuko Kobayashi; Miki Doi
- Running time: 15 minutes
- Production company: NHK

Original release
- Network: NHK
- Release: March 30 – November 27, 2020

Yell (エール) is a Japanese television drama series and the 102nd Asadora series, following Scarlet. It premiered on March 30, 2020 and concluded on November 27, 2020. It was the first Asadora to be recorded in 4K, and the first since Musume to Watashi to be broadcast in only five 15-minute episodes per week Monday through Friday, with omnibus airings on Saturday mornings instead of a fresh episode.

== Cast ==
=== Koyama's family ===
- Masataka Kubota as Yūichi Koyama (based on Yūji Koseki)
  - Sera Ishida as young Yūichi
- Toshiaki Karasawa as Saburō Koyama, Yūichi's father
- Momoko Kikuchi as Masa Koyama, Yūichi's mother
- Takara Sakumoto as Kōji Koyama, Yūichi's brother
- Morio Kazama as Mohei Gōndō, Yūichi's uncle and Masa's older brother

=== Sekiuchi's family ===
- Fumi Nikaidō as Oto Sekiuchi, Yūichi's wife (based on Kinko Koseki)
  - Kaho Shimizu as young Oto
- Ken Mitsuishi as Yasutaka Sekiuchi, Oto's father
- Hiroko Yakushimaru as Mitsuko Sekiuchi, Oto's mother
- Rena Matsui as Gin Sekiuchi, Oto's older sister
  - Toito Honma as young Gin
- Nana Mori as Ume Sekiuchi, Oto's younger sister
  - Chise Niitsu as young Ume

=== Fukushima people ===
- Ikusaburō Yamazaki as Hisashi Satō, Yūichi's classmate and childhood friend (based on Hisao Itō)
  - Taiki Yamaguchi as young Hisashi
- Aoi Nakamura as Tetsuo Murano, Yūichi's classmate and childhood friend (based on Toshio Nomura)
  - Taiga Komie as young Tetsuo
- Naotarō Moriyama as Kiyoharu Tōdō, Yūichi's school teacher

==== Kitaichi kimono shop ====
- Daichi Sugawara as Takahiko Ōgawara, the owner
- Shin Shimizu as Hiroto Kuwata, the shop clerk
- Taketo Tanaka as Shizuo Oikawa, the shop clerk

=== Kawamata people ===
==== Kawamata Bank ====
- Kazuyuki Aijima as Gorō Ochiai, a bank branch manager
- Satoru Matsuo as Renpei Suzuki, a bank clerk
- Keiko Horiuchi as Shōko Kikuchi, a bank clerk
- Ayumu Mochizuki as Kanda Matsuzaka, a bank clerk

==== Others ====
- Mayu Hotta as Suzu

=== Tokyo people ===
==== Columbus Records ====
- Arata Furuta as Homare Hatsukaishi, the company's director
- Yojiro Noda as Masato Kogarashi, a composer (based on Masao Koga)
- Kayano as Akane Sugiyama, the company's secretary

==== Bamboo ====
- Tooru Nomaguchi as Tamotsu Katori, the owner
- Riisa Naka as Megumi Katori, Tamotsu's wife

==== Others ====
- Ken Shimura as Kōzō Oyamada (based on Kosaku Yamada)
- Ko Shibasaki as Tamaki Futaura (based on Tamaki Miura)
- Takahiro Miura as Takashi Tanaka
- Nozomi Inoue as Fujimaru, a singer (based on Otomaru)
- Hayato Kakizawa as Tarō Yamafuji, a singer (based on Ichirō Fujiyama)
- Mayuko Kominami as Chizuko Natsume

== Production ==
On April 1, 2020, NHK announced that filming schedules for both Kirin ga Kuru and Yell were cancelled until April 12 to consider the safety of performers and staff during the COVID-19 pandemic. By April 7, NHK extended the cancellation of shooting for both series after Prime Minister Shinzo Abe proclaimed a one-month state of emergency for Tokyo and other prefectures. The series was resumed on September 14, 2020.

== Accolades ==
Ceremony	Category	Nominees	Result	Ref
24th Nikkan Sports Drama Grand Prix	Best Supporting Actress	Fumi Nikaidō	Won	

Preceded by Scarlet	Asadora; March 30, 2020 – November 27, 2020	Succeeded by Ochoyan
