= Blue Thermal =

Japanese manga series

- Blue Thermal: Aonagi Daigaku Taiiku-kai Kōkū-bu
- Cover of Blue Thermal: Aonagi Daigaku Taiiku-kai Kōkū-bu volume 1 by Shinchosha

ブルーサーマル -青凪大学体育会航空部- (Burū Sāmaru: Aonagi Daigaku Taiiku-kai Kōkū-bu)
- Manga
- Written by: Kana Ozawa
- Published by: Shinchosha
- Magazine: Monthly Comic @ Bunch
- Original run: April 2015 – November 2017
- Volumes: 5
- Manga

Blue Thermal: First Flight
- Written by: Kana Ozawa
- Published by: Line Corporation; Shinchosha
- Magazine: Line Manga
- Original run: November 20, 2021 – January 2022
- Volumes: 1
- Anime film
- Directed by: Masaki Tachibana
- Written by: Masaki Tachibana; Natsuko Takahashi
- Music by: Shōgo Kaida
- Studio: Telecom Animation Film
- Licensed by: NA: Eleven Arts
- Released: March 4, 2022
- Runtime: 103 minutes

Blue Thermal: Aonagi Daigaku Taiiku-kai Kōkū-bu (ブルーサーマル -青凪大学体育会航空部-, Burū Sāmaru: Aonagi Daigaku Taiiku-kai Kōkū-bu; "Blue Thermal: Aonagi College Sports Festival Aviation Club") is a Japanese manga series by Kana Ozawa. It was serialized in Shinchosha's seinen manga magazine Monthly Comic @ Bunch between April 2015 and November 2017 and was collected in five tankōbon volumes. A prequel manga by Ozawa titled Blue Thermal: First Flight (ブルーサーマル FIRST FLIGHT, Burū Sāmaru: First Flight) has been serialized online via Line Corporation's Line Manga website between November 2021 and January 2022 and was collected in a single tankōbon volume by Shinchosha. An anime film adaptation by Telecom Animation Film was released in March 2022.

== Plot ==
Tamaki Tsuru, a first-year student at Aonagi University, hopes to enjoy a typical college life centered on friendships and romance. Intending to avoid intense athletics, she tries out for the tennis club, but an accident during practice leads her to damage a model glider belonging to the university's Aviation Club. Unable to pay for the repairs, Tamaki is pressured into working off her debt and is reluctantly drawn into the club's activities by its captain, Jun Kuramochi. Although initially resistant and disillusioned with campus life, Tamaki's perspective begins to change after Kuramochi takes her on a glider flight, where she becomes captivated by the experience of soaring through the sky. The story traces her gradual involvement with the glider club and her growing connection to aviation as she reconsiders her goals, relationships, and sense of purpose.

== Characters ==
Tamaki Tsuru (都留たまき, Tsuru Tamaki)
Voiced by: Mayu Hotta
Jun Kuramochi (倉持潤, Kuramochi Jun)
Voiced by: Nobunaga Shimazaki
Daisuke Sorachi (空知大介, Sorachi Daisuke)
Voiced by: Junya Enoki
Chizuru Yano (矢野ちづる, Yano Chizuru)
Voiced by: Mikako Komatsu
Yō Asahina (朝比奈燿, Asahina Yō)
Voiced by: Daisuke Ono
Yukari Muroi (室井ゆかり, Muroi Yukari)
Voiced by: Haruka Shiraishi
Ayako Maki (牧綾子, Maki Ayako)
Voiced by: Yō Taichi
Eita Narihara (成原映太, Narihara Eita)
Voiced by: Ayumu Murase
Ryōhei Nanba (南葉良平, Nanba Ryōhei)
Voiced by: Makoto Furukawa
Kaori Mochida (望田薫, Mochida Kaori)
Voiced by: Rie Takahashi
Harukaze Aihara (相原春風, Aihara Harukaze)
Voiced by: Taku Yashiro
Kaede Hatori (羽鳥楓, Hatori Kaede)
Voiced by: Kengo Kawanishi
Aonagi's director (青凪大学の監督, Aonagi Daigaku no Kantoku)
Voiced by: Minori Terada

== Media ==
=== Manga ===
==== Volume list ====
No.	Release date	ISBN
1	September 9, 2015	978-4-10-771840-2
2	April 9, 2016	978-4-10-771886-0
3	September 9, 2016	978-4-10-771915-7
4	May 9, 2017	978-4-10-771978-2
5	February 9, 2018	978-4-10-772049-8

==== Blue Thermal: First Flight ====
No.	Release date	ISBN
1	February 9, 2022	978-4-10-772464-9

=== Film ===
An anime film adaptation by Telecom Animation Film premiered in Japan on March 4, 2022. Masaki Tachibana directed the film, and wrote the film's script with Natsuko Takahashi. The character designs were provided by Miho Tanino, while the music was composed by Shōgo Kaida. Four-member piano rock band SHE'S performed the film's titular theme song "Blue Thermal" and the insert song "Beautiful Bird". During their Anime NYC panel, Eleven Arts licensed the film for North America release.
