= Tonkatsu DJ Agetarō =

Japanese manga and anime series

- Manga volume 1 cover

とんかつDJアゲ太郎
- Genre: Comedy
- Manga
- Written by: yipiao
- Illustrated by: Yūjirō Koyama
- Published by: Shueisha
- Magazine: Shōnen Jump+
- Original run: November 2014 – March 2017
- Volumes: 11
- Anime television series
- Directed by: Akitaro Daichi
- Music by: Daisuke Fujiwara
- Studio: Studio Deen
- Licensed by: Crunchyroll
- Original run: April 10, 2016 – June 26, 2016
- Episodes: 12
- Live-action film
- Directed by: Ken Ninomiya
- Studio: Warner Bros. Pictures
- Released: October 30, 2020
- icon

Tonkatsu DJ Agetarō (とんかつDJアゲ太郎) is a Japanese manga series written by yipiao and illustrated by Yūjirō Koyama. It has been serialized online via Shueisha's digital publication Shōnen Jump+ since November 2014, and is also serialized in Shueisha's fashion magazine Men's Non-no. It has been collected in eleven tankōbon volumes. A 12-episode anime television series adaptation directed by Akitaro Daichi and animated at Studio Deen aired between April 10 and June 26, 2016.

A live-action film adaptation was originally scheduled to be released on June 19, 2020, but was delayed to October 30, 2020, due to the COVID-19 pandemic.

== Characters ==
Agetarō Katsumata (勝又 揚太郎, Katsumata Agetarō)
Voiced by: Daiki Yamashita
Played by: Takumi Kitamura
Agesaku Katsumata (勝又 揚作, Katsumata Agesaku)
Voiced by: Kōji Ishii
Played by: Brother Tom
Katsuyo Katsumata (勝又 かつ代, Katsumata Katsuyo)
Voiced by: Kanako Tōjō
Played by: Reiko Kataoka
Koromo Katsumata (勝又 ころも, Katsumata Koromo)
Voiced by: Rio Totoki
Played by: Natsumi Ikema
DJ Oily (DJオイリー, DJ Oiri)
Voiced by: Keiji Fujiwara
Played by: Yusuke Iseya
Shūgo Oshibori (忍堀 修吾, Oshibori Shūgo)
Voiced by: Kenjiro Tsuda
Gorō Mizokuro (溝黒 悟朗, Mizokuro Gorō)
Voiced by: Takashi Matsuyama
Sonoko Hattori (服部 苑子, Hattori Sonoko)
Voiced by: M.A.O
Played by: Maika Yamamoto
DJ Big Master Fly (DJビッグマスターフライ, DJ Biggu Masutā Furai)
Voiced by: Chafurin

== See also ==
- Tonkatsu
- Disc jockey
