= Jad Saxton =

American voice actress

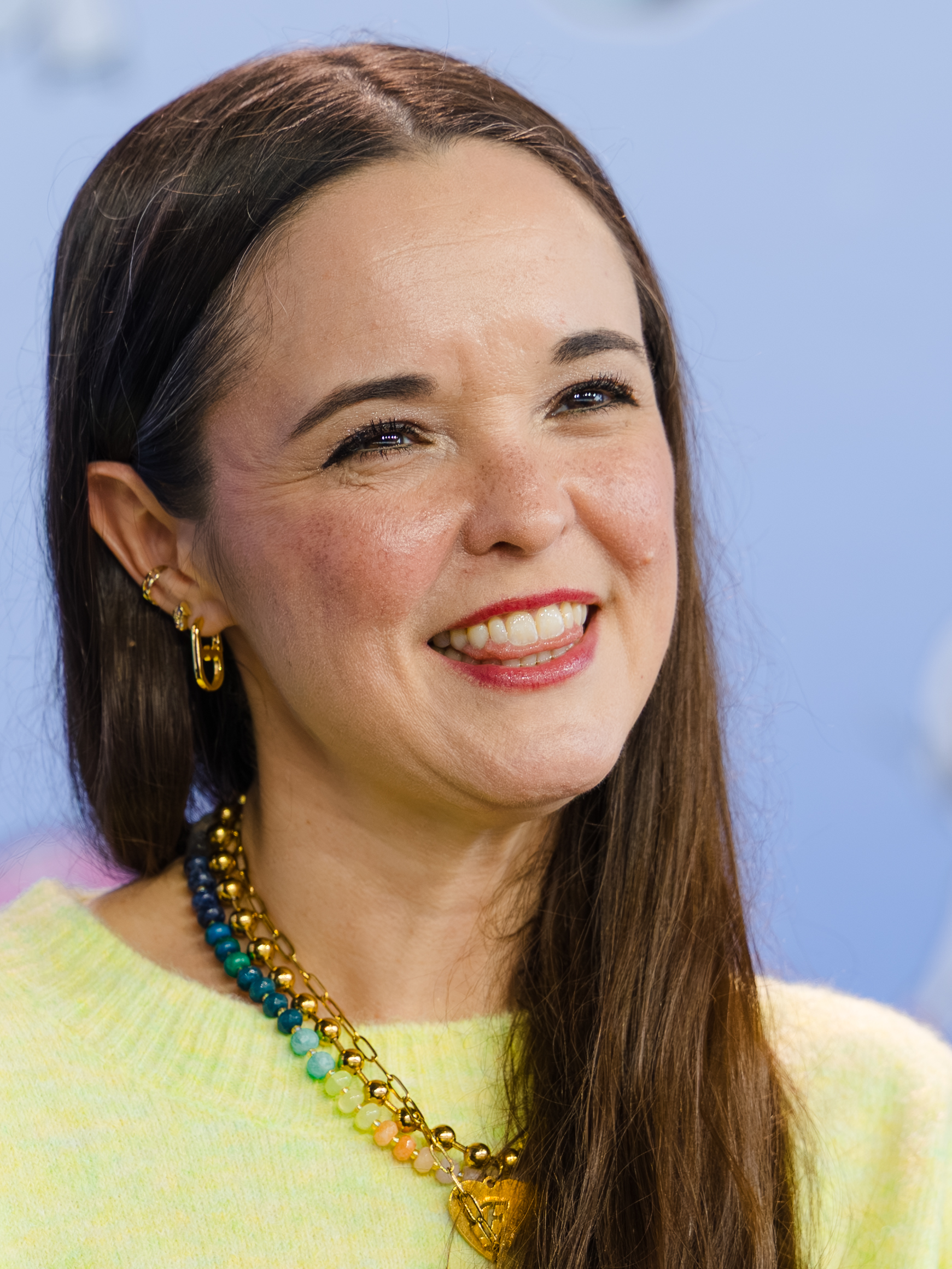
- Saxton at GalaxyCon Nashville in 2026
- Born: Texas, U.S.
- Education: Texas Wesleyan University (B.A., 2005)
- Occupations: Voice actress; ADR Director
- Years active: 2008–present
- Agent: Core Talent
- Notable work: Kaguya-sama: Love Is War as Chika Fujiwara; Tomo-chan Is a Girl! as Misuzu Gundo; Food Wars!: Shokugeki no Soma as Megumi Tadokoro; Fruits Basket as Saki Hanajima; High School DxD as Koneko Tojo; Date A Live as Miku Izayoi; Fire Force as Tamaki Kotatsu; Steins;Gate as Faris NyanNyan/Rumiho Akiha

Jad Saxton (/dʒeɪd/) is an American voice actress and voice director.

== Early life ==
Her name is an acronym of her parents' names, Jimmi and David, and is pronounced "Jayd". She grew up with a good singing voice, which eventually led to her first voice role in Sasami: Magical Girls Club as Eimi Mori, and her first major voice role was Masako Hara in Ghost Hunt. She graduated summa cum laude from Texas Wesleyan University with a Bachelor of Arts in music in 2005.

Having spent years as a voice actress for Funimation, Sentai Filmworks and Crunchyroll, Saxton began to work as an ADR director in 2017.

== Filmography ==
=== Anime ===
List of dubbing performances in anime
Year	Title	Role	Notes	Source
2008	Ghost Hunt	Masako Hara	Debut role	
2008	Sasami: Magical Girls Club	Eimi Mori		
2008	Ouran High School Host Club	Ayumi Munakata		
2009	Baccano!	Eve Genoard		
2009	Bamboo Blade	Konatsu Harada		
2009	Kaze no Stigma	Kanon Suzuhara		
2009	Dragonaut: The Resonance	Megumi Jinguji		
2010	Soul Eater	Jacqueline O. Lantern Dupré	also Soul Eater Not!	
2010	Strike Witches series	Perrine H. Clostermann	Also ADR Director for 501st Joint Fighter Wing Take Off!	
2011	Ga-Rei: Zero	Miku Manabe		
2011	Haganai	Sena Kashiwazaki		
2011	Hero Tales	Taki		
2012	A Certain Magical Index series	Komoe Tsukuyomi	also A Certain Scientific Railgun	
2012	Aria the Scarlet Ammo	Reki	also Aria the Scarlet Ammo AA	
2012	B Gata H Kei: Yamada's First Time	Mayu Miyano		
2012	Fafner: Dead Aggressor: Heaven and Earth	Seri Tatekami		
2012	Shangri-La	Karin Ishida		
2012	Shiki	Yuki Shiomi		
2012	Steins;Gate series	Faris NyanNyan		
2012	Freezing	Arnett McMillan		
2012	Mass Effect: Paragon Lost	April		
2012	Ōkami-san and her Seven Companions	Mimi Usami		
2012	Is This a Zombie? series	Haruna		
2012–19	Fairy Tail	Carla		
2013	Toriko	Yun		
2013	Eureka Seven: AO	Elena Peoples		
2013	Future Diary	Orin Miyashiro		
2013	Michiko & Hatchin	Hana "Hatchin" Morenos		
2013	Good Luck Girl!	Kurumi Minowa	Ep. 8	
2013	High School DxD series	Koneko Toujou	ADR Director for High School DxD Hero	
2013	Maken-ki! series	Syria Otsuka		
2013	Last Exile: Fam, the Silver Wing	Fam Fan Fan		
2013–present	One Piece	Nico Robin (Child), Adele, Nojiko (Young), Vegapunk Atlas	Funimation dub	
2014	Space Dandy	Adélie	Ep. 5	
2014	Sunday Without God	Tanya Swedgewood		
2014	Code:Breaker	Aoba Takatsu		
2014	Ghost in the Shell: Arise	Logicoma		
2014	Log Horizon series	Akatsuki		
2014	Psycho-Pass series	Komissa		
2014	Karneval	Tsukumo		
2014	Kamisama Kiss series	Onikiri		
2015	Yurikuma Arashi	Kaoru Harishima		
2015	D-Frag!	Noe Kazama		
2015	Death Parade	Nona		
2015	Gangsta	Constance Raveau		
2015	Mikagura School Suite	Otone Fujishiro		
2015	The Heroic Legend of Arslan	Alfreed		
2015	The Rolling Girls	Ai Hibiki		
2015	Shomin Sample	Eri Hanae		
2015	Show by Rock!! series	Un		
2015	Sky Wizards Academy	Yuri Flostre		
2015	Nobunagun	Sio Ogura		
2015	Maid Sama!	Suzuna Ayuzawa		
2015	Ninja Slayer From Animation	Electronic Maiko		
2015	Tokyo Ghoul series	Yoriko Kosaka		
2015	Tokyo Ravens	Suzuka Dairenji		
2015	Ultimate Otaku Teacher	Koyomi Hīragi		
2015	Unbreakable Machine-Doll	Lisette Norden/Eliza		
2015	Seraph of the End	Noin Teta	Ep. 2	
2015	World Break: Aria of Curse for a Holy Swordsman	Shizuno Urushibara		
2016	Trinity Seven	Sora		
2016	And You Thought There Is Never a Girl Online?	Akane Segawa		
2016	Castle Town Dandelion	Misaki Sakurada		
2016	Puzzle & Dragons X	Garnet		
2016	Rage of Bahamut: Genesis	Jeanne d'Arc		
2016	Rampo Kitan: Game of Laplace	Minami		
2016	Dimension W	Mira Yurizaki		
2016	Divine Gate	Ruri		
2016	Dragonar Academy	Avdocha Kiltzkaya		
2016	Danganronpa 3: The End of Hope's Peak High School series	Ruruka Andō		
2016	Date A Live II	Miku Izayoi		
2016	Pandora in the Crimson Shell: Ghost Urn	Takumi Korobase		
2016	No-Rin	Ringo Kinoshita		
2016	My Neighbor Seki	Tomoka Hashino		
2016	Monster Hunter Stories: Ride On	Mil		
2016	Selector Spread WIXOSS	Iona Urazoe (Real)		
2016	Servamp	Lila		
2016	Izetta: The Last Witch	Sophie		
2016	Handa-kun	Miyoko Kinjo		
2016	Keijo!!!!!!!!	Kotone Fujisaki		
2016	Garo: The Animation	Ximena Coronado		
2016	Grimgar of Fantasy and Ash	Merry		
2016	First Love Monster	Sadako	Eps. 11-12	
2016	The Vision of Escaflowne	Yukari Uchida	Funimation dub	
2016	Tōken Ranbu: Hanamaru	Akita Toshiro	ADR Director	
2016	Tokyo ESP	Hanako	Eps. 7, 9	
2016	Terror in Resonance	Lisa Mishima		
2016	Love Live! Sunshine!!	Chika Takami	Assistant ADR Director (Season 2)	
2016	Lord Marksman and Vanadis	Ludmila Lourie		
2017	Seven Mortal Sins	Astaroth		
2017	ACCA: 13-Territory Inspection Dept.	Passer	Ep. 9	
2017	Amagi Brilliant Park	Additional Voices		
2017	Akashic Records of Bastard Magic Instructor	Wendy Navless		
2017	Akiba's Trip: The Animation	Matome Mayonaka		
2017	Taboo Tattoo	Tōko Ichinose		
2017	Tsugumomo	Tatami Tadata		
2017	Tsuredure Children	Hotaru Furuya		
2017	Ushio and Tora	Rama's Sister	Ep. 34	
2017	Valkyrie Drive: Mermaid	Momoka Sagara		
2017	WorldEnd: What are you doing at the end of the world? Are you busy? Will you save us?	Almita		
2017	The Royal Tutor	Adele von Granzreich		
2017	The Silver Guardian	Wanchoi	ADR Director	
2017	Convenience Store Boy Friends		ADR Director	
2017	Chain Chronicle: The Light of Haecceitas	Lilith		
2017	Chaos;Child	Senri Minamisawa		
2017	Chronos Ruler	Mīna Putin		
2017	Code Geass: Akito the Exiled	Jean Rowe		
2017	Dies Irae	Marie		
2017	Gamers!	Konoha Hoshinomori	Eps. 8-10	
2017	Hand Shakers	Musubu Takatsuki		
2017	Himouto! Umaru-chan	Kirie Motoba		
2017	Hyoka	Kurako Eba		
2017	Interviews with Monster Girls		ADR Director	
2017	Juni Taisen: Zodiac War	Kiyoko Ino	Ep. 1	
2017	KanColle: Kantai Collection	Naka		
2017	King's Game The Animation	Misaki Nakajima		
2017	Konohana Kitan	Sakura	Co-ADR Director	
2017	Love Tyrant	Guri		
2017	Luck & Logic	Mana Asuha		
2017	Miss Kobayashi's Dragon Maid	Kanna Kamui		
2017	Monster Musume	Manako		
2017	Myriad Colors Phantom World	Ruru		
2017	New Game!!	Momiji Mochizuki	Season 2	
2017	Regalia: The Three Sacred Stars	Kei Tiesto		
2017	Restaurant to Another World	Victoria Samanark	Eps. 5–6, 10	
2017	Sakura Quest	Sakumi Enomoto	Ep. 14	
2017–23	Food Wars!	Megumi Tadokoro		
2017–24	My Hero Academia	Itsuka Kendō		
2017–present	Black Clover	Dorothy Unsworth		
2018	Island	Rinne Ohara		
2018	Kakuriyo: Bed and Breakfast for Spirits		Co-ADR Director	
2018	Lord of Vermilion: The Crimson King	Tsubaki Manazuru		
2018	Junji Ito Collection	Yue	Ep. 12	
2018	Karakai Jozu no Takagi-san	Mano	Season 1	
2018	Katana Maidens ~ Toji No Miko	Yume Tsubakuro		
2018	How Not to Summon a Demon Lord	Rem Galleu		
2018	Overlord II	Lakyus Alvein Dale Aindra	Season 2	
2018	Pop Team Epic	Popuko	Ep. 4a	
2018	Dances with the Dragons	Jokanne		
2018	Conception	Falun		
2018	Concrete Revolutio series	Kikko Hoshino		
2018	Basilisk: The Ōka Ninja Scrolls	Utsutsu		
2018	Cardcaptor Sakura: Clear Card	Momo		
2018	Senran Kagura: Shinovi Master	Kagura		
2018	Ace Attorney	Regina Berry	anime adaptation	
2018	Magical Girl Raising Project	Tama	ADR Director	
2018	Zombie Land Saga	Shiori, Iron Frill 2018 Center	ADR Director	
2019	Endro!		ADR Director	
2019	Boogiepop and Others	Aya Orihata		
2019	My Roommate is a Cat	Haru		
2019	The Helpful Fox Senko-san		ADR Director	
2019	Nichijou	Professor Shinonome	ADR director	
2019	How Heavy Are the Dumbbells You Lift?		ADR Director	
2019	Ensemble Stars!		ADR Director	
2019	Date A Live III	Miku Izayoi		
2019	My Youth Romantic Comedy Is Wrong, As I Expected	Meguri Shiromeguri		
2019	African Office Worker	Lethal Hamster	ADR Director	
2019	No Guns Life	Rinko		
2019	Azur Lane	Illustrious		
2019	Actors: Songs Connection	Haruna		
2019–21	Fruits Basket	Saki Hanajima	2019 reboot	
2019–26	Fire Force	Tamaki Kotatsu		
2019–present	That Time I Got Reincarnated as a Slime	Ramiris		
2020	Bofuri: I Don't Want to Get Hurt, so I'll Max Out My Defense	Sally	2 seasons	
2020	Nekopara	Young Maple	ADR Director	
2020	Smile Down the Runway	Ichika Tsumura		
2020	Kakushigoto		ADR Director	
2020	By the Grace of the Gods		ADR Director	
2020	Wandering Witch: The Journey of Elaina	Fran		
2020–22	Uzaki-chan Wants to Hang Out!	Ami Asai		
2020–22	Kaguya-sama: Love is War	Chika Fujiwara		
2020–25	Toilet-Bound Hanako-kun		ADR Director	
2021	Suppose a Kid from the Last Dungeon Boonies Moved to a Starter Town	Choline		
2021	Mars Red		ADR Director	
2021	How a Realist Hero Rebuilt the Kingdom	Roroa Amidonia		
2021	Banished from the Hero's Party	Tisse Garland		
2021	The Detective Is Already Dead	Yui Saikawa	Season 1	
2021	Irina: The Vampire Cosmonaut	Anya		
2021	Seirei Gensouki: Spirit Chronicles	Orphia	Season 1; 2 episodes	
2022	Girls' Frontline	P7		
2022	Trapped in a Dating Sim: The World of Otome Games Is Tough for Mobs	Olivia		
2022	Heroines Run the Show	Sora		
2022	Smile of the Arsnotoria the Animation	Ars		
2022–25	Spy × Family	George Glooman, Aquarium Announcer	Eps. 12, 19. ADR Director (Season 3)	
2023	Tomo-chan Is a Girl!	Misuzu Gundo		
2023	Sacrificial Princess and the King of Beasts	Anubis/Sirius (Young)		
2023–25	Frieren: Beyond Journey's End		ADR Director	
2024	Fairy Tail: 100 Years Quest	Carla		
2024	Oshi no Ko	Abiko Samejima	Season 2	
2024	Insomniacs After School	Isaki Magari		
2024	Dungeon People	Eye Monster, Little Clay, Fire Spirit		
2025	Plus-Sized Elf	Raika		
2025	Solo Leveling	Esil Radiru	Season 2	
2025	Watari-kun's ****** Is About to Collapse	Suzu		
2026	Dead Account	Haijima	4 episodes	
2026	The 100 Girlfriends Who Really, Really, Really, Really, Really Love You	Yaku Yakuzen	Season 3; 6 episodes	
2026	The Apothecary Diaries	White Lady	Season 3	

=== Films ===
List of dubbing performances in direct-to-video, television films and feature films
Year	Title	Role	Notes	Source
2012	Fafner: Dead Aggressor – Exodus	Seri Tatekami		
2012	Mass Effect: Paragon Lost	April		
2013	Wolf Children	Yuki		
2013	Blood-C: The Last Dark	Mana Hīragi		
2013	Fairy Tail the Movie: Phoenix Priestess	Carla		
2015	A Certain Magical Index: The Movie – The Miracle of Endymion	Komoe Tsukuyomi		
2015	Ghost in the Shell: The New Movie	Logicoma		
2016	Psycho-Pass: The Movie	Komissa		
2016	Strike Witches: The Movie	Perrine H. Clostermann		
2016	Escaflowne	Yukari Uchida		
2017	Steins;Gate: The Movie − Load Region of Déjà Vu	Faris Nyannyan		
2017	Fairy Tail: Dragon Cry	Carla		
2018	Garo: Divine Flame	Ximena Luis		
2018	Tokyo Ghoul	Yoriko Kosaka		
2020	Love Live! Sunshine!! Over The Rainbow	Chika Takami		

=== Video games ===
List of voice performances in video games
Year	Title	Role	Notes	Source
2015	Dragon Ball Xenoverse	Time Patroller		
2016	Dragon Ball Xenoverse 2	Time Patroller		
2016	Smite	Hel		
2017	Paladins	Maeve		
2019	Conception Plus: Maidens of the Twelve Stars	Sue		
2019	Borderlands 3	Leah Hart, Female Looter		
2025	Zenless Zone Zero	Dialyn		
