= Yūka Kageyama =

Japanese actress and television personality (born 2001)

- 影山 優佳
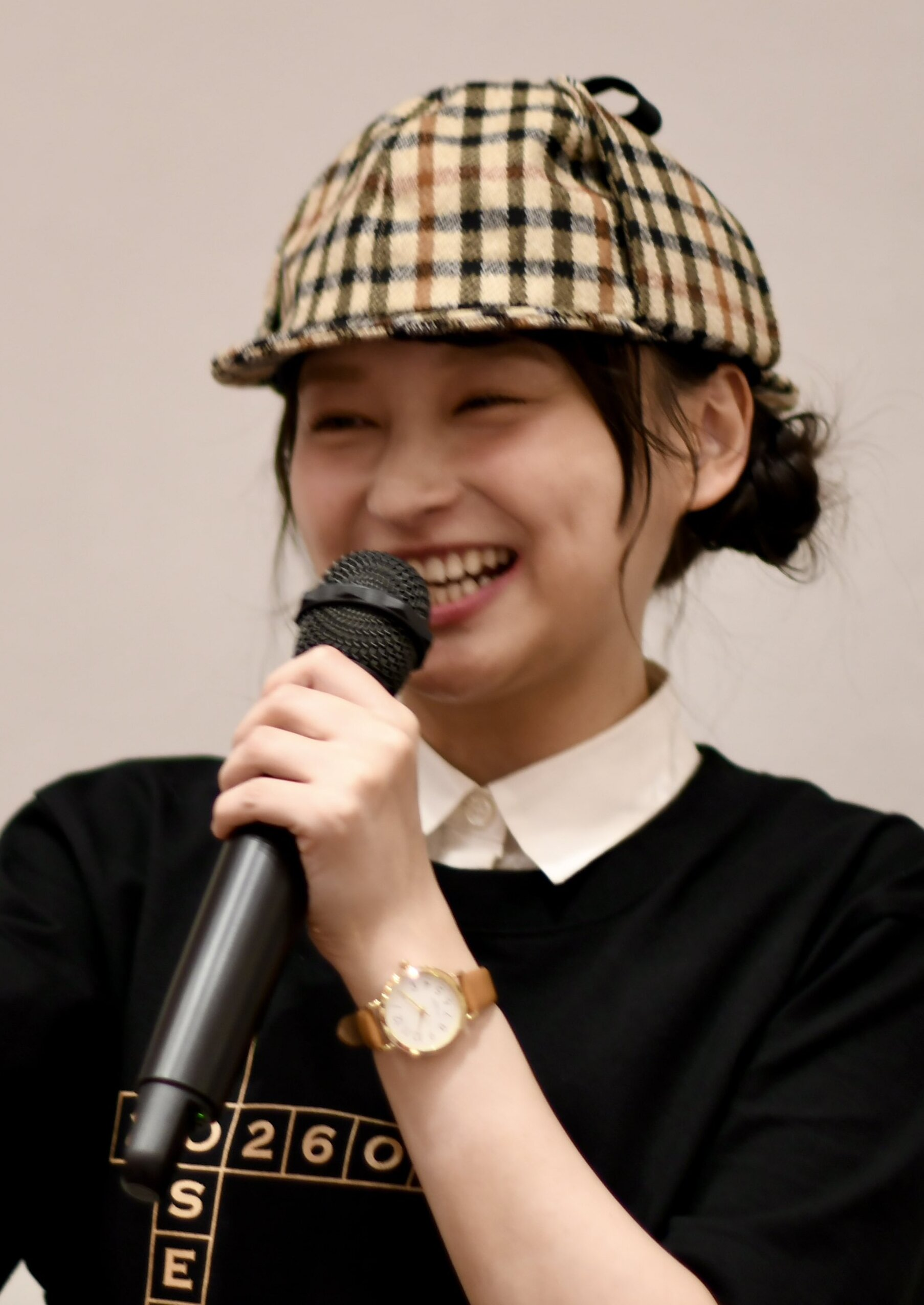
- Kageyama in 2026
- Born: May 8, 2001 (age 25); Tokyo, Japan
- Occupations: Actress; Television personality
- Years active: 2016–2018; 2020–present
- Agent: Production Ogi
- Musical career
- Genre: J-pop
- Years active: 2016–2018; 2020–2023
- Label: Sony
- Formerly of: Hinatazaka46
- Website: Official website

Yūka Kageyama (Japanese: 影山 優佳, Hepburn: Kageyama Yūka; born May 8, 2001) is a Japanese actress and television personality. She gained national recognition for her football expertise and commentary, particularly during the 2022 FIFA World Cup, and has continued her football-related media work alongside her entertainment career, including coverage of the 2026 FIFA World Cup.

Kageyama began her career as a member of the girl group Hinatazaka46 (formerly Hiragana Keyakizaka46) from 2016 to 2023. She made her acting debut in the group's television drama Re:Mind (2017) and film debut in Kaguya-sama Final: Love Is War (2021). She took an extended hiatus from 2018 to 2020 for academic reasons, during which she won a bronze medal in the 2018 Japan Philosophy and Ethics Grand Prix. After resuming her entertainment activities in 2020, she began to establish herself in football media by writing a blog series covering all the teams competing in the J.League and appearing on multiple football talk shows, including a self-titled miniseries, as well as becoming a brand ambassador for the long-running FIFA football video game series. Her game analyses and multiple accurate predictions as a recurring commentator during the 2022 FIFA World Cup brought her national recognition. Aside from football, she also frequently appeared on quiz shows and became the youngest contestant to win the Q-sama!! quiz show in May 2023. She left Hinatazaka46 in 2023 due to a persistent hearing disorder, before which she released her first photobook, titled Shiranai Koto Darake.

After departing from Hinatazaka46, Kageyama joined the Production Ogi agency and has since expanded her career as an actress and television personality, appearing in television dramas, films, stage productions, variety programs, and commercials. Her notable works include Hakobiya (2024), the first stage adaptation of Future Boy Conan (2024), Mr. Mikami's Classroom, Synanthrope, and Salary Man Kintaro (all 2025). She also released a best-selling essay collection in 2026, titled Kage Made Aishite.

== Career ==
=== 2015–2018: Early career, acting debut ===
In 2015, Kageyama took part in the second AKB48 Group Draft Conference, a joint audition held by AKB48 and its Japan-based sister groups. She advanced to the final round, but was not selected to become a trainee.

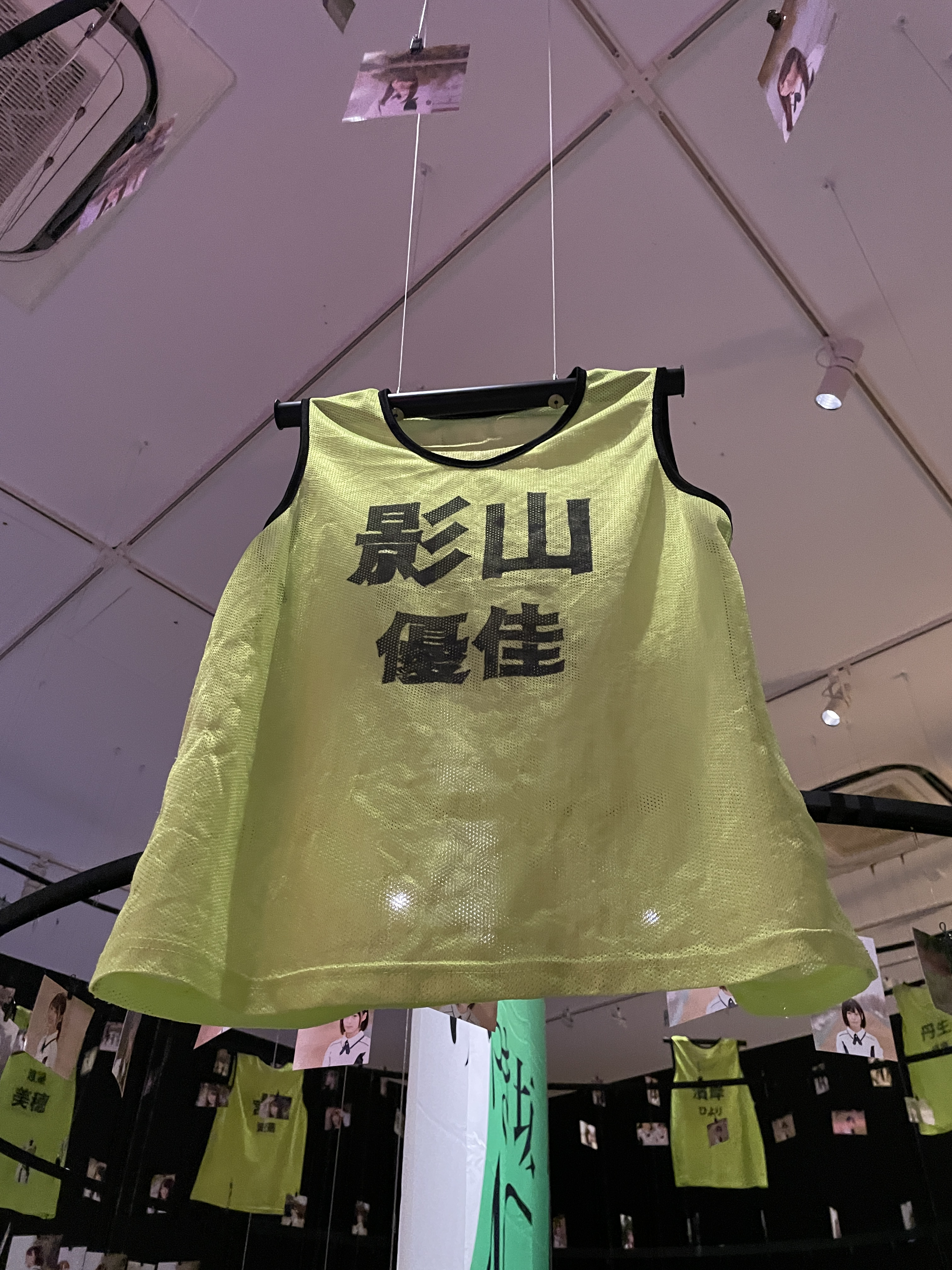
Kageyama's practice bib in Hiragana Keyakizaka46.

On May 8, 2016, the same day as her 15th birthday, Kageyama passed the audition for Hiragana Keyakizaka46 and became a first generation member of the group. She was introduced to the public on May 11. Her first concert was on October 28 of the same year at Akasaka Blitz, where she performed Keyakizaka46's songs "Silent Majority" and "Sekai ni wa Ai Shika Nai", as well as Hiragana Keyakizaka46's own "Hiragana Keyaki". Within the group, Kageyama was noted for her abilities in both academics and sports, which are often shown in her television appearances, in addition to her singing skills.

In 2017, Kageyama made her acting debut in the Hiragana Keyakizaka46 drama Re:Mind, aired on TV Tokyo and Netflix. Real Sound praised her "impactful" performance as the hidden mastermind, her insane nature "flickering" as she calmly explains her plan during the reveal.

=== 2018–2020: Hiatus ===
On June 1, 2018, Kageyama announced that she was going into hiatus to prepare for the University of Tokyo entrance examinations. During her hiatus, she won a bronze medal in the 2018 Japan Philosophy and Ethics Grand Prix. She later revealed that she did not take the university examinations in the end, due to health issues.

In February 2019, Hiragana Keyakizaka46 was rebranded into Hinatazaka46. Kageyama did not take part in Hinatazaka46's first four singles; her first participation in a Hinatazaka46 music release was for the 2020 album Hinatazaka. However, she did make surprise appearances in the final concert of the 2018 Hashiridasu Shunkan Tour and in the group's 2019 photobook, Tachikogi. She resumed entertainment activities on May 26, 2020, with a post on her official blog.

=== 2020–2023: Football-related appearances, feature film debut, departure from Hinatazaka46 ===
Kageyama has been an association football enthusiast since childhood and played regularly on a local boys' team before joining Hiragana Keyakizaka46. Her catchphrases include "The soccer-loving girl" (Note: サッカー大好き少女, Sakkā daisuki shōjo) and "Gegenpressing to your heart". (Note: あなたのハートにゲーゲンプレス, Anata no hāto ni gēgenpuresu) She holds a Class 4 referee qualification (Note: In the Japan Football Association referee system, Class 4 would qualify her to referee "football matches organised by prefectural football associations' branches and by groups and federations etc. registered in the districtual/municipal/local football associations".) and regularly wrote about the Japanese league on her blog in a series titled "Yūka Kageyama's WE LOVE J.League", which aimed to cover all 56 teams from all three league divisions. Her favorite teams include Sanfrecce Hiroshima, Borussia Dortmund, and Leeds United F.C.

Kageyama became a recurring guest in the TV Tokyo football talk show Foot×Brain and Atsuto Uchida's Football Time on DAZN, and was appointed Special Analyst for Foot×Brain in October thanks to her knowledge in football strategy. Former Japan national football team player Tsuyoshi Kitazawa named her the "number one football expert in the idol world"; football manager and former national team player Keisuke Honda also noted her extensive knowledge and encouraged her to express her opinions "more freely". In December, Kageyama co-hosted her first self-titled football talk show miniseries on Hikari TV Channel with former Japan national team captain Yuji Nakazawa, which was titled Yuji Nakazawa and Yūka Kageyama's Talking Football and ran for three episodes. In May 2021, she announced her fandom name, Kagesapo (カゲサポ), which means both "Kageyama Supporters" and "those who support her from the shadows". (Note: "Shadow" (影, kage) is the first kanji character of Kageyama's name.)

Kageyama had her first voice acting role as Ayame Ebina in the animated adaptation of the football manga Farewell, My Dear Cramer (2021) on Tokyo MX, and also served as the production's "support manager". She made her first feature film appearance in Kaguya-sama Final: Love Is War (2021). During production, co-star Kanna Hashimoto noticed a screenshot circulating on social media from the home media release promotions of the Hiragana Oshi variety show, in which Kageyama expressed her admiration of Hashimoto; the two became friends, with Kageyama later describing Hashimoto as an "older sister" figure. Real Sound positively commented on her "funny expressions" in the film and that her intelligent image matched that of her character, Miko Iino.

Kageyama and fellow Hinatazaka46 members Mei Higashimura and Konoka Matsuda were appointed support ambassadors for DAZN's AFC Asian Cup Qualifications "Road to Qatar" campaign, which ran from August 2021 to March 2022. Kageyama also produced football educational video content for the campaign. Also in 2021, Kageyama was appointed the Japan Ambassador for the football simulation video game FIFA 22, after having served as an ambassador for the J Club FIFA 21 Festival early that year, and co-hosted the 2021 J.League awards with comedian Hiroyuki Yabe and announcer Akihiko Nishioka. She went on to become a co-host for the pre-2022 FIFA World Cup talk show FIFA World Cup 64, co-produced by TV Asahi and Abema, and also co-hosted several live match broadcasts of the event itself, where she was noted for her game analyses and multiple accurate predictions, which earned her the moniker "Goddess of Victory". Her increased activity during that period made the hashtag "#KageyamaGoToSleep" (#影山寝ろ, #KageyamaNero) a trending topic on social media on multiple occasions. In October 2026, she jokingly highlighted her ability to fall into a deep sleep within 10 minutes, sparking renewed discussion of the hashtag.

Kageyama placed fourth on the top ten list of rising female talents of the first half of 2022 according to Talent Power Ranking, published in July and attributed to her increasing appearances on football and quiz shows. In January 2023, Smart Flash reported that she placed second on an advertising industry polling of female talents predicted to make a breakthrough that year.

Aside from football, Kageyama was appointed the "fair character" (event ambassador) for the twentieth anniversary fair of book publisher Kobunsha's "Kobunsha New Books" (光文社新書, Kobunsha Shinshō) product line in October 2021. Fellow Hinatazaka46 member Manamo Miyata would also participate in the "Kobunsha Classics" fifteenth anniversary fair. As a philomath, she revealed in 2022 that she had obtained qualifications in several fields, including World Heritage Sites, news and current affairs, real estate, pharmaceuticals, as well as certifications for dental assistant and psychological counselor professions. She also frequently appeared on quiz shows, and at age 22 became the youngest contestant to win the Q-sama!! quiz show on TV Asahi, aired in May 2023.

In 2023, Kageyama revealed her membership in the Japan chapter of Mensa International, remarking that she wished to utilize the parts of her thinking that become "chaotic" from having too many perspectives. She also received the Cotton Award from the Japan Spinners Association, which cited her "natural" and "refreshing" image and wide range of activities and qualifications as qualities reflecting the versatility of cotton.

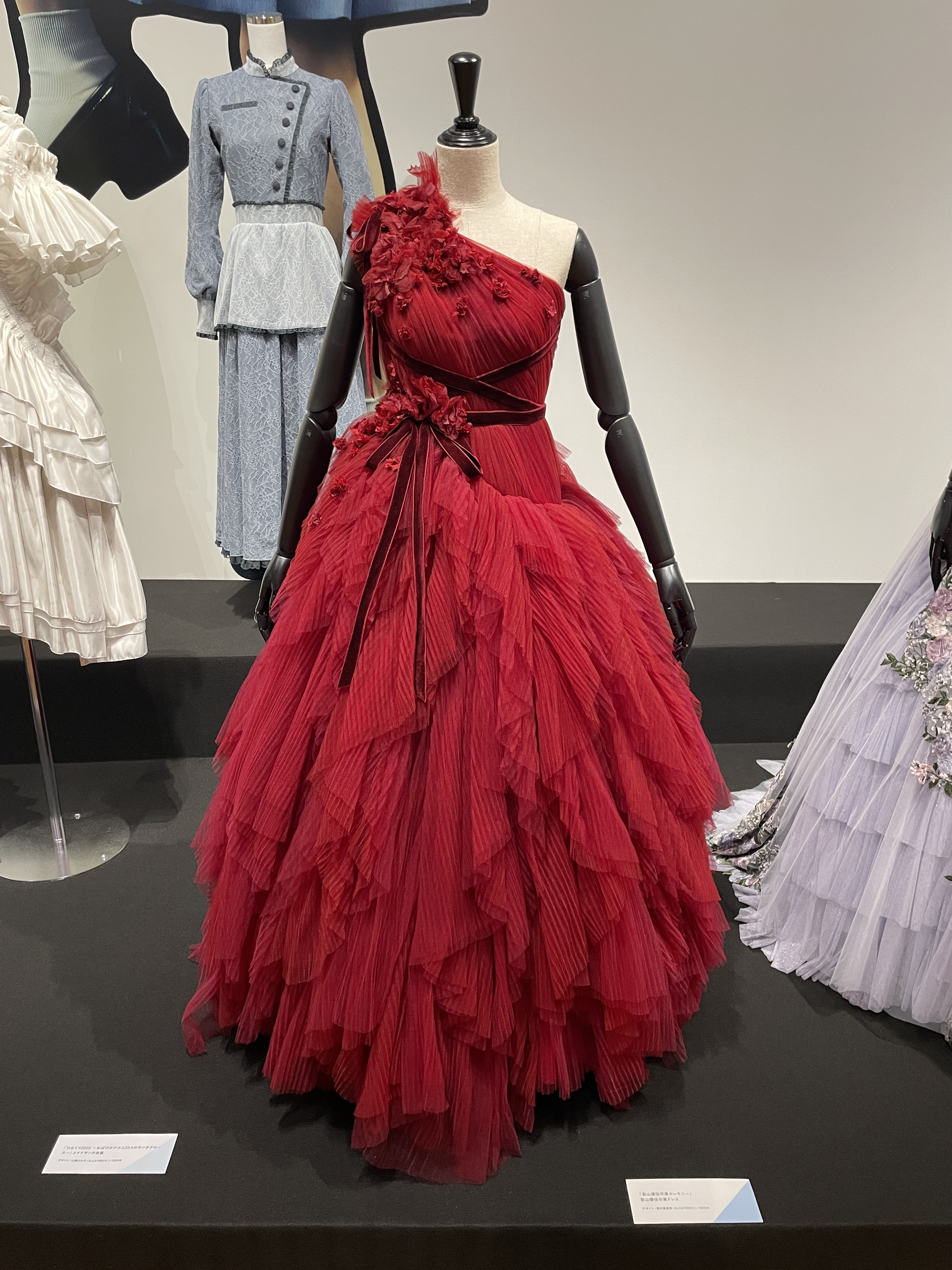
The red dress worn by Kageyama in her "graduation" ceremony.

On February 17, 2023, Kageyama announced that she would leave Hinatazaka46 after the promotional cycle for the group's ninth single has concluded, due to a persistent hearing disorder. She would serve as center (lead performer) for "Tomo yo, Ichibanboshi da", a song released on the single about friends who part ways to pursue different dreams, with its music video filmed at the Kashima Soccer Stadium. Her photobook, titled Shiranai Koto Darake (知らないことだらけ, lit. 'Full of the Unknown') and published by Fusosha, was released on May 9 and sold 49 thousand copies in its first week, placing it first on the Oricon Weekly Book Ranking. The photography took place in the prefectures of Tokyo, Nagano, and Okinawa. She held her "graduation" ceremony on July 19 at the Tokyo International Forum, Hall A, before officially leaving Hinatazaka46 two days later.

=== 2023–present: Solo career ===
In October 2023, Kageyama announced her affiliation with the talent agency Production Ogi and launched her official website, Kagesapo no Oseki (かげさぽのお席; lit. 'Kagesapo's Seats').

Kageyama was a regular cast member, with the title of "Special Supporter", for the sports talk show Abema Sports Time on Abema from July 2023 to December 2024. Her visit to the Emirates Stadium in London in October 2024 to interview Arsenal F.C. defender Takehiro Tomiyasu and the club's supporters was particularly well received.

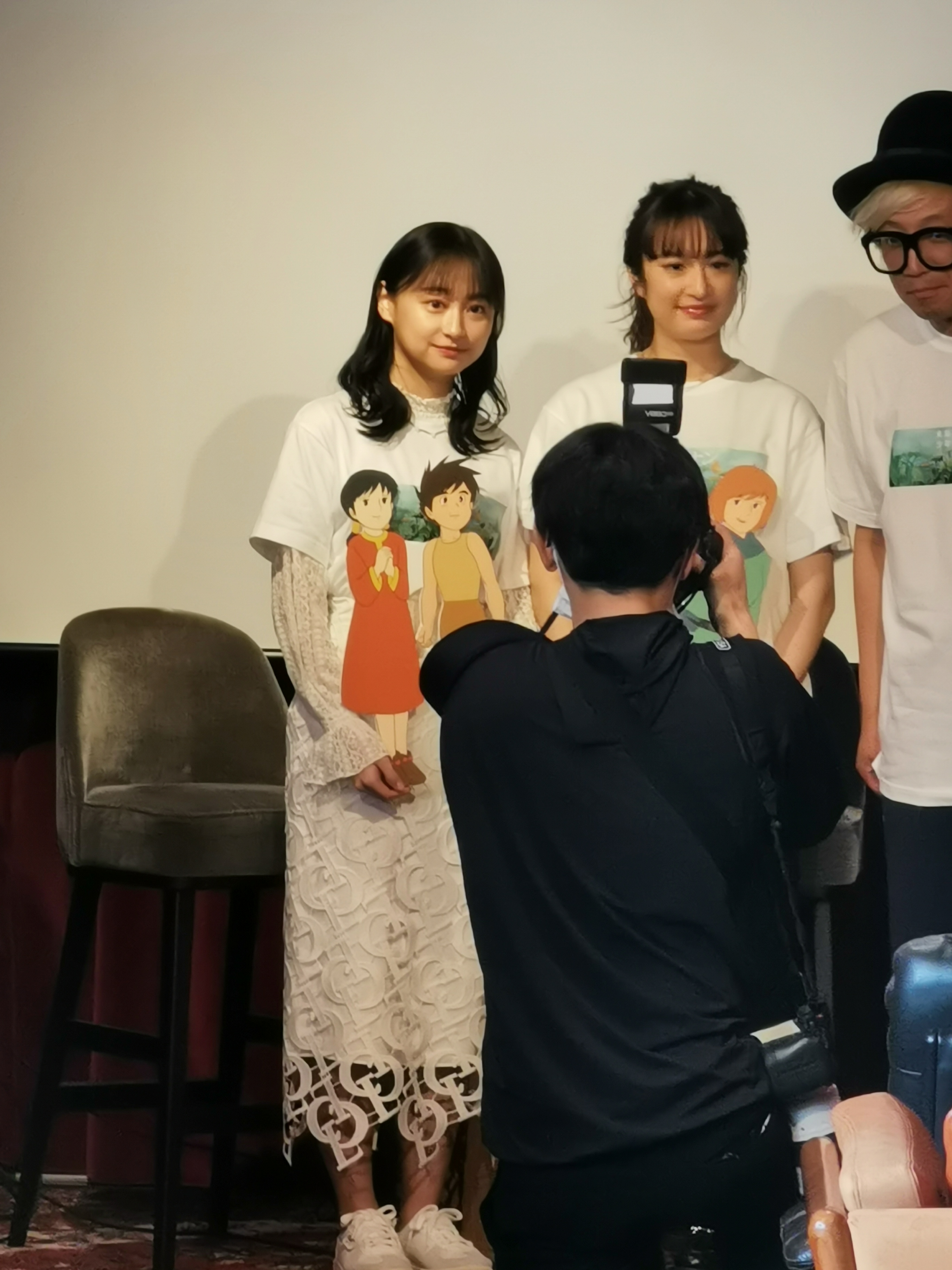
Kageyama at a 2024 Future Boy Conan talk show, Harakado Mall, Harajuku

In 2024, Kageyama co-starred in the television drama Hakobiya on TV Tokyo and played a supporting role in Haru ni Nattara on Fuji TV. From May to June 2024, she portrayed female lead Lana in the first stage adaptation of the 1978 animated series Future Boy Conan, held at the Tokyo Metropolitan Theatre. She also started co-hosting Wellmi & Nessko, a short drama and talk show series about health and wellness on Nippon TV. She expanded her list of personal credentials with qualifications as a sake sommelier (日本酒の唎酒師, nihonshu no kikisakeshi) and tequila maestro, bringing her total qualifications count to 18.

In 2025, Kageyama appeared in both installments of the two-part film Salary Man Kintaro, as well as the television dramas Mr. Mikami's Classroom, Musashino Rondo, The Asayama Family, Escape, Synanthrope, and Scandal Eve. Bayashi of Real Sound praised her range in portraying diverse characters, from the timid Riri in Escape to reserved intellectuals Yume and Nana in Mr. Mikami's Classroom and Synanthrope respectively, noting her use of subtle gestures and mannerisms to differentiate each role. Yuki Orita, writing for the same publication, remarked that within the large cast of Mr. Mikami's Classroom, she was able to be "conspicuous" while not overshadowing others, and to use both technical and emotional depth to express Yume's returnee background through subtle variations in her speech pattern, concluding that Kageyama is a "surprisingly excellent actor" who could sway those skeptical of former idols who transitioned to acting.

Kageyama participated in the tribute concert commemorating the 43rd debut anniversary of J-pop legend Akina Nakamori, titled Meikyō (明響) (Note: Written with the kanji characters for "bright" (明), also used in Nakamori's name, and "reverberate" (響); together means "Make Akina Reverberate!" (明菜を響かせる！, Akina o Hibikaseru!) or "Akina Reverberates!" (明菜が響く！, Akina ga Hibiku!).) and held on May 1–2, 2025 at the Line Cube Shibuya. She covered "Second Love" (1982) and "Southern Wind" (1984), remarking that she was "unusually nervous" as it was her first time singing solo at a concert. She also met fellow football enthusiast Shiori Tamai of Momoiro Clover Z, who also performed solo.

The audition and entertainment information site Deview placed Kageyama first on its 2026 Next Breakout Ranking for actresses, released on January 30, 2026, noting her "natural" acting style as displayed in various drama appearances throughout 2025, as well as her anticipated participation in 2026 FIFA World Cup commentary. Fellow former Hinatazaka46 member Kyōko Saitō also appeared on second place.

Kageyama released her first essay collection, Kage Made Aishite (影まで愛して; lit. 'Love Even My Shadow'), on July 30. She remarked that she wrote the book to reveal her "real" self through her writings. The book placed third on the Entertainment category of book distributor Tōhan's best-seller list for its release week.

For the 2026 World Cup, Kageyama again participated in live reporting for the sports streaming platform DAZN, which held the broadcasting rights in Japan. In addition to studio reporting, she traveled to Dallas, United States, and Monterrey, Mexico, for on-site reporting on the Japan national football team's three group matches, as well as to host KageRepo, a special program in which she would experience the football culture and tourism in those cities firsthand. She also appeared in the music video of the platform's football anthem, "1000%" by rock band Orange Range.

Kageyama will appear in the 2027 stage adaptation of the novel Real World by Natsuo Kirino, directed by American actor John Malkovich.

== Personal life ==
Kageyama described her family as "football lovers", and they traveled overseas to support the Japan national team during her childhood. Her mother also holds a referee qualification, while her younger brother Shūto played for the Kokushikan University football team and is the director of the Tokyo Metropolitan Football League club Svabo Tokyo. The family owns a Chihuahua named Chico.

Shortly before joining Hiragana Keyakizaka46, Kageyama took part in a homestay program in Philadelphia, United States. She returned there in 2025 for the travel talk show Another Sky on Nippon TV, where she reunited with her host family.

Kageyama graduated from University of Tsukuba High School, considered one of the most "prestigious" schools in Japan. As a student, she was a member of the quiz research club and organized quiz events for middle school students; some of those students later competed in the 42nd All Japan High School Quiz Championship, where she served as an observer in 2022.

== Discography ==
Kageyama performed in Hinatazaka46 title songs from the album Hinatazaka (2020) to the single "One Choice" (2023). Notable appearances include:

- "Natsuiro no Mule" (夏色のミュール; lit. 'Summer-colored Mules') (released on Hashiridasu Shunkan, 2018), as a quartet with Mao Iguchi, Mana Takase, and Mei Higashimura
- "Sonota Ōzei Type" (その他大勢タイプ; transl. The Regular Guy Type) (released on "Tsuki to Hoshi ga Odoru Midnight", 2022), with Suzuka Tomita, Miku Kanemura, and Hinano Kamimura
- "One Choice" (2023), formation front row
- "Tomo yo, Ichibanboshi da" (友よ 一番星だ; lit. 'Hey Friend, It's the First Star') (released on "One Choice", 2023), center (lead performer)

== Filmography ==
=== Feature film ===
Kageyama's film appearances
Year	Title	Role	Notes	Ref(s)
2021	Kaguya-sama Final: Love Is War	Miko Iino		
2025	Salary Man Kintaro	Kazumi Maeda		
2025	Salary Man Kintaro 2	Kazumi Maeda		
2027	The High School Family	Arisa Yumiki		

=== Television series ===
Kageyama's television series appearances
Year	Title	Role	Notes	Ref(s)
2017	Re:Mind	Yūka Kageyama		
2021	Farewell, My Dear Cramer	Ayame Ebina (voice)		
2023	Case Closed	Herself (voice)	Episode 1083; cameo appearance	
2024	Hakobiya	Anna Amano	Female lead	
2024	Haru ni Nattara	Airi Saito		
2024	Octo	Miku Takizawa		
2024	My Diary	Kaede		
2025	Mr. Mikami's Classroom	Yume Kurayoshi		
2025	Musashino Rondo	Yoriko Numata		
2025	The Asayama Family	Miki Kimoto		
2025	Escape	Riri Kōsaka	Episode 3; guest appearance	
2025	Synanthrope	Nana Satomi		
2025	Scandal Eve	Ayaka Mori		
2026	Lunacy	Toko Ouchi		
2026	Case Closed	Herself (voice)	Episode 1207; guest star	
2026	Plastic Beauty	Hinano Tachibana	Episodes 1−2	

=== Web video ===
Kageyama's web video appearances
Year	Title	Role	Notes	Ref(s)
2023	OtsukaresaMatch Time Leap	Kageyama-chan	Lead role; commercial for Match	
2024	Toshio Free Wi-Fi	Adachi	Short drama series	

=== Variety and talk shows ===
Kageyama's variety and talk show appearances
Year	Title	Role	Notes	Ref(s)
2020–present	Foot×Brain	Recurring guest, Special Analyst		
2020–2021	Yuji Nakazawa and Yūka Kageyama (Hinatazaka46)'s Talking Football	Co-host		
2021–2022	DAZN AFC Asian Qualifiers	Support Ambassador	With Mei Higashimura and Konoka Matsuda	
2021–present	Atsuto Uchida's Football Time	Recurring guest		
2021–present	The Toppa File	Customs Officer (in skits)		
2022	42nd All Japan High School Quiz Championship	Observer	With Konoka Matsuda	
2022	FIFA World Cup 64	Co-host		
2023	Q-sama!!	Contestant	Contest winner of May 29, 3-hour special	
2023–2024	Abema Sports Time	Regular, Special Supporter		
2024–present	Wellmi and Nessko	Co-host ("Wellmi")		
2025	Another Sky	Guest	Appeared in June 28 episode documenting her visit to Philadelphia, United States	
2026	KageRepo	Host		

=== Commercials ===
Kageyama in a Digital Positive Action public service announcement

Commercials
- SMAS playlist on YouTube
- Kanadevia playlist on YouTube

- Match (Otsuka Pharmaceutical) (2022)
- Uniqlo (2023)
- d Smartphone Loan (NTT Docomo) (2023)
- Puma Palermo (2024)
- SMAS (Sumitomo Mitsui Auto Service, SMBC Group) (2024–2026)
- Winner (Japan Sports Council) (2024)
- Kanadevia (2024–2026)
- Town Housing (Town Group)
- Tokyo Metropolitan Government Bureau of Social Welfare (2024)
- Nihongo Partners (Japan Foundation) (2025)
- Sarigena (Disney) (2025)
- Digital Positive Action (Ministry of Internal Affairs and Communications) (2025)
- McDonald's Japan (2026)

=== Music videos ===
Music videos
- "Pixel" on YouTube
- "Wonderland" on YouTube
- "1000%" on YouTube

- Taku Inoue, "Pixel" (feat. Narumiya) (2025)
- Omoinotake, "Wonderland" (2026)
- Orange Range, "1000%" (2026)

== Theater ==
Kageyama's stage play appearances
Year	Title	Role	Venue(s)	Notes	Ref(s)
2018	Ayumi	Multiple	AiiA 2.5 Theater Tokyo		
2024	Future Boy Conan	Lana	Tokyo Metropolitan Theatre	Lead role	
2026	Secret Stage	Yuriko	Tokyo Tatemono Pia Theater		
2027	Real World		Tokyo Metropolitan Theatre; Medikit Arts Center (Miyazaki); Santomyuze Ueda City Cultural Exchange Center (Nagano); Tokai City Arts Theater (Aichi); Hankyu Theater, Hyogo Performing Arts Center; Akita Arts Theatre Mille Has (Akita)		

== Other appearances ==
=== Radio ===
Kageyama's radio programs
Year	Title	Role	Network	Notes	Ref(s)
2022–2023	Lawson presents Hinatazaka46's Hotto Hitoiki! (ローソン presents 日向坂46のほっとひといき!; lit. 'Lawson presents Hinatazaka46's A Moment of Relaxation!')	Host	Tokyo FM	April 1, 2022–March 24, 2023	
2026–present	SMAS Presents Kageyama Yūka no Mirai e SusundeMAS! (SMASプレゼンツ 影山優佳のミライへ進んでマス！; lit. 'SMAS Presents Yūka Kageyama's Advancing to the Future!')	Host	Nippon Broadcasting System		

== Bibliography ==
Kageyama's book releases
Title	Release date	Publisher	ISBN	Remark
Shiranai Koto Darake (知らないことだらけ, lit. 'Full of the Unknown')	May 9, 2023	Fusosha	ISBN 978-4594094379	Photobook
Kage Made Aishite (影まで愛して; lit. 'Love Even My Shadow')	July 30, 2026	Magazine House	ISBN 978-4838733903	Essay collection
