= Mayu Hotta =

Japanese actress (born 1998)

- 堀田 真由
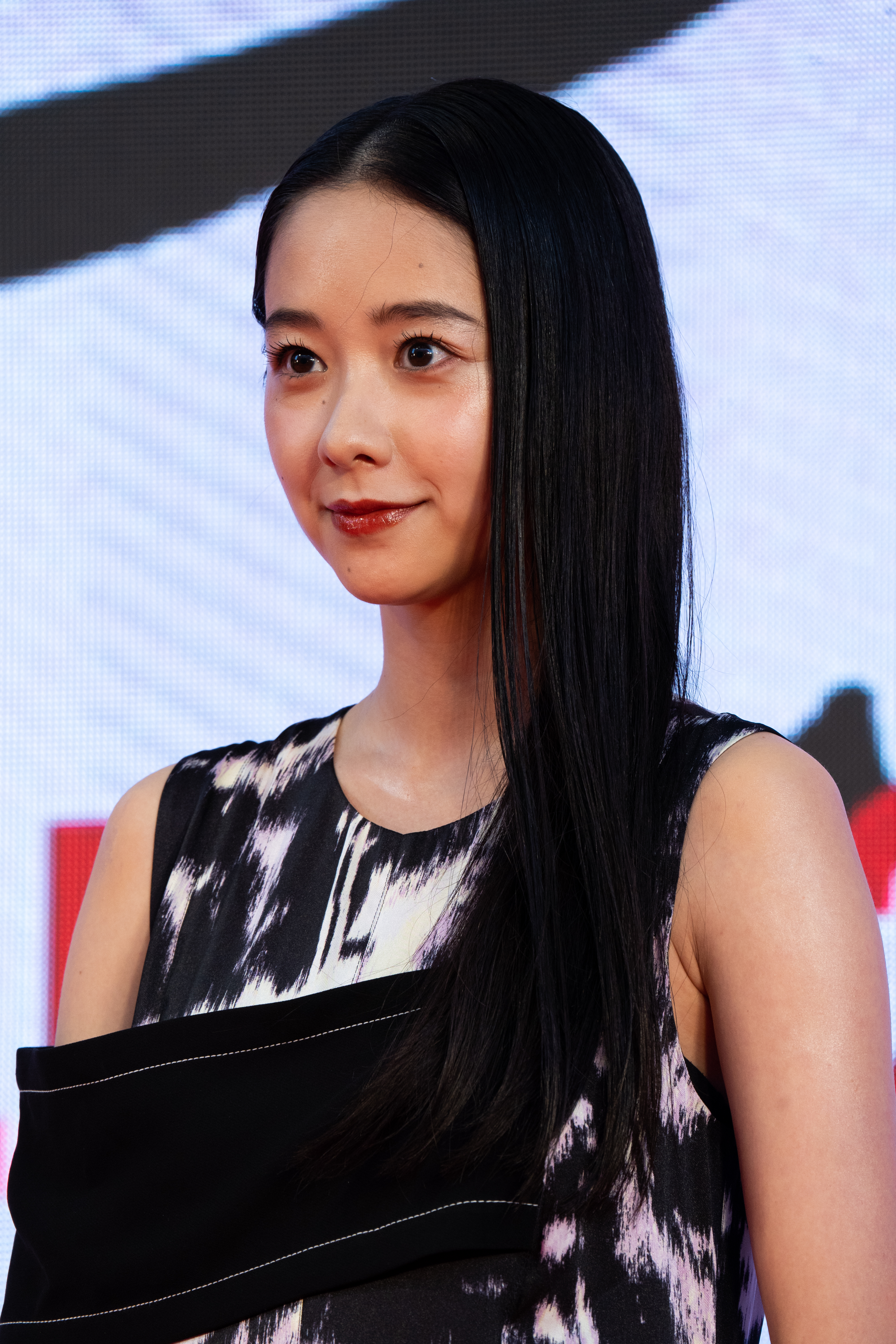
- Hotta in 2019
- Born: April 2, 1998 (age 28); Shiga Prefecture, Japan
- Occupation: Actress
- Years active: 2014–present
- Notable credits: Welcome to the Occult Forest; Kaguya-sama: Love Is War; Blue Thermal

Mayu Hotta (堀田 真由, Hotta Mayu; born April 2, 1998, in Shiga Prefecture) is a Japanese actress. She has played lead roles in the 2022 live-action television and film adaptations of Welcome to the Occult Forest, and voiced the lead role of Tamaki Tsuru in the 2022 animated film Blue Thermal. Her supporting roles include Ai Hayasaka in the 2019 film Kaguya-sama: Love Is War, and Hina in the 2022 NHK taiga drama The 13 Lords of the Shogun.

== Early life ==
Hotta was born on April 2, 1998, in Shiga Prefecture. After going to Tokyo to participate in a group audition for the lead role in the drama Solomon's Perjury but failing to win the role, she received additional acting training at the Toei Company Tokyo studio, then in 2014 she participated in another audition event held by the Amuse agency, winning an award from satellite broadcaster Wowow.

== Career ==
Hotta's first role came in the 2014 Wowow 4-episode drama Themis' Sentence, playing the younger sister of the lead character. After a series of minor appearances in television shows, in 2017 she joined the cast of the NHK asadora Warotenka as Rin Fujioka, the younger sister of the lead character, who was played by Wakana Aoi. Hotta followed these appearances with a series of supporting roles in film adaptations of popular Japanese manga. She played the girlfriend of one of the main characters in the 2018 film adaptation of the manga Rainbow Days, took on the role of Ai Hayasaka in the 2019 film adaptation of Kaguya-sama: Love Is War and its 2021 sequel Kaguya-sama Final: Love Is War, appeared in the 2019 film He Won't Kill, She Won't Die, played Ikumatsu in the 2019 film Rurouni Kenshin: The Beginning, joined the cast of the 2020 film adaptation of Liar × Liar, and played Serina Kanno in the 2021 Shochiku film adaptation of Honey Lemon Soda.

Hotta's first lead role in a film came in the 2019 dramatic film Prison 13, based on the Stanford Prison Experiment, in which she played a guard in a prison-like scenario concocted by an online content creator. The following year she became a regular model for Non-no, appearing in the magazine for the first time in the March 2020 issue and on the cover for the first time in the November 2021 issue. Hotta returned to NHK with her portrayal of Shizu in the 2020 NHK asadora Yell, and appeared as Hina in the 2022 NHK taiga drama The 13 Lords of the Shogun. She again worked with Wowow on the 2022 television drama True Identity, an adaptation of a Tamehito Somei novel. Hotta played the lead role of Miho Ichikawa, an assistant director working on a horror film, in Welcome to the Occult Forest, a 6-episode 2022 Wowow drama that was also edited to film length and released in theaters. She also took on her first voice acting role as the lead character Tamaki Tsuru in the 2022 anime adaptation of Blue Thermal, a story about members of a glider club.

== Filmography ==
=== Film ===
Year	Title	Role	Notes	Ref.
2018	Rainbow Days	Yukiko "Yukirin" Asai		
2019	Kaguya-sama: Love Is War	Ai Hayasaka		
2019	He Won't Kill, She Won't Die	Kyapiko		
2019	Prison 13	Mari	Lead role	
2021	Kaguya-sama Final: Love Is War	Ai Hayasaka		
2021	Rurouni Kenshin: The Beginning	Ikumatsu		
2021	Liar × Liar	Maki Noguchi		
2021	Honey Lemon Soda	Serina Kanno		
2022	Blue Thermal	Tamaki Tsuru (voice)	Lead role	
2022	Welcome to the Occultic Woods	Miho Ichikawa	Lead role	
2023	Tsugaru Lacquer Girl	Miyako Aoki	Lead role	
2023	The Forbidden Play	Maya Hiraoka		
2023	Fly Me to the Saitama: From Biwa Lake with Love	Miko Ōmi		
2024	Love You as the World Ends: The Final	Aoi Hatori		
2024	In an Isolated Cottage on a Snowy Mountain	Atsuko Kasahara		
2026	Your Own Quiz	Ema Kirisaki		
2026	I Don't Know You	Satsuki	French-Japanese film	
2026	The Village of Eight Gravestones	Miyako Mori		
2027	Ghost	Neekei (voice)	Lead role	
2027	Mada Minu Kimi e	Nozomi		

=== Television drama ===
Year	Title	Role	Notes	Ref.
2015	Themis' Sentence	Honoka Hirakawa		
2016	Cold Case	Young Hijiri Seya	Episode 7	
2017	Laugh It Up!	Rin	Asadora	
2019	Mr. Hiiragi's Homeroom	Karen Kumazawa		
2020	Yell	Shizu	Asadora	
2022	Welcome to the Occultic Woods	Miho Ichikawa	Lead role	
2022	The 13 Lords of the Shogun	Hina	Taiga drama	
2023	Ōoku: The Inner Chambers	Tokugawa Iemitsu		
2023	Kazama Kimichika: Kyojo Zero	Yukiha Igami		
2023	Code Japan: The Price of Wishes	Saki Miyake		
2023	Every Precious Moment	Miri Kōno	Lead role	
2024	Antihero	Asuka Shinomiya		
2024	Colors of Sisterhood	Ryo Machida	Lead role	
2025	Mr. Mikami's Classroom	Yuzuru Mayama		
2025	School Lawyer: Finding the Colors of the Stars	Suzu Kōda		
2026	Grass for My Pillow	Akiko Yuki	Television film	
2026	Rock Paper Landmine	Esora Ukita		
2026	Blossom	Sayoko Mori	Asadora	

=== Other television ===
Year	Title	Notes	Ref.
2025–26	Another Sky	As a host	

== Awards and nominations ==
Year	Award	Category	Work(s)	Result	Ref.
2024	45th Yokohama Film Festival	Best Newcomer	Tsugaru Lacquer Girl	Won	
2024	48th Elan d'or Awards	Newcomer of the Year	Herself	Won	
