= Kaguya-sama: Love Is War =

Japanese manga series by Aka Akasaka and its adaptations

- First tankōbon volume cover, featuring Kaguya Shinomiya

かぐや様は告らせたい ～天才たちの恋愛頭脳戦～ (Kaguya-sama wa Kokurasetai – Tensai-tachi no Ren'ai Zunōsen)
- Genre: Psychological; Romantic comedy; Slice of life
- Manga
- Written by: Aka Akasaka
- Published by: Shueisha
- English publisher: NA: Viz Media
- Imprint: Young Jump Comics
- Magazine: Miracle Jump; (May 19, 2015 – January 19, 2016); Weekly Young Jump; (March 24, 2016 – November 2, 2022)
- Original run: May 19, 2015 – November 2, 2022
- Volumes: 28
- Manga

Kaguya-sama wa Kokurasetai: Dōjin-ban
- Written by: Shinta Sakayama
- Published by: Shueisha
- Imprint: Young Jump Comics
- Magazine: Tonari no Young Jump
- Original run: June 14, 2018 – June 25, 2020
- Volumes: 4
- Manga

Kaguya-sama o Kataritai
- Written by: G3 Ida
- Published by: Shueisha
- Imprint: Young Jump Comics
- Magazine: Weekly Young Jump
- Original run: July 26, 2018 – November 2, 2022
- Volumes: 8
- Anime television series
- Kaguya-sama: Love Is War (2019–2022)
- Anime film
- Kaguya-sama: Love Is War – The First Kiss That Never Ends (2022)
- Live-action films
- Kaguya-sama: Love Is War (2019); Kaguya-sama Final: Love Is War (2021)
- icon

Kaguya-sama: Love Is War (Japanese: かぐや様は告らせたい ～天才たちの恋愛頭脳戦～, Hepburn: Kaguya-sama wa Kokurasetai: Tensai-tachi no Ren'ai Zunōsen; lit. 'Lady Kaguya Wants to Make Him Confess: The Geniuses' War of Hearts and Minds') is a Japanese manga series written and illustrated by Aka Akasaka. It was first serialized in Shueisha's seinen manga magazine Miracle Jump from May 2015 to January 2016, and later transferred to Weekly Young Jump, where it ran from March 2016 to November 2022. Its chapters were collected in 28 tankōbon volumes. In North America, the manga is licensed in English by Viz Media.

An anime television series adaptation, produced by A-1 Pictures, aired in 2019. It was followed by a second season aired in 2020, an original video animation (OVA) episode released in 2021, and a third season aired in 2022. An anime film, titled The First Kiss That Never Ends, premiered in theaters in December 2022. An anime television special, titled The Stairway to Adulthood, aired in 2025. An anime film serving as the story's conclusion, titled The Final Chapter, has been announced. A live-action film adaptation, directed by Hayato Kawai, was released in September 2019.

By December 2022, the manga had over 22 million copies in circulation, making it one of the best-selling manga series of all time. In 2020, Kaguya-sama: Love Is War won the 65th Shogakukan Manga Award in the general category.

== Premise ==
In the senior high school division of Shuchiin Academy, student council president Miyuki Shirogane and vice president Kaguya Shinomiya appear to be a perfect match. Kaguya is the daughter of a wealthy conglomerate family, and Miyuki is the top student at the school and well known across the prefecture. Although they like each other, they are too proud to confess their love, as they believe whoever does so first would "lose" in their relationship. The story follows their many schemes to make the other one confess or at least show signs of affection.

Halfway through the series, they manage to confess to each other. From there, focus shifts on how they advance their relationship and deal with remaining obstacles. The presence and complexity of several other characters notably increases over time as well.

== Production ==
=== Conception ===
Akasaka was writing the manga Instant Bullets for Weekly Young Jump and wanted to come up with another series. In an interview on Livedoor News, Akasaka said the original plot for Kaguya-sama was more of a fantasy and game of death, but his editor wanted something more mainstream and, at the time, Young Jump did not have a casual romcom series. It was Akasaka's first manga in the romcom genre.

Akasaka set the series in high school as it was a time when he did not have much experience with dating and romance himself. He was thinking of high school relationships while smoking some food, and came up with the concept of wanting to reclaim some of his emotions of his youth in a fantasy. He envisioned "two tsunderes who like each other having battles of the mind". He thought that was a very common concept, but was surprised to find that readers were telling him that his premise was innovative. Also at first, he wanted to do more intellectual battles like Death Note but the theme changed more to "clashing of romantic emotions". He has also cited School Rumble as an influence on his work.

=== Character design ===
The characters' names were derived from the monogatari The Tale of the Bamboo Cutter (better known outside of Japan as The Tale of Princess Kaguya). Akasaka stated that he has long liked princess stories and that Kaguya-hime, the main character from the aforementioned monogatari, was one of the most famous princess stories. In developing the characters, he said that Kaguya and Miyuki initially have the same personality and thought process, like twins, which made their exposition to the reader easier to understand. He then developed more divergence between the two. Other characters were developed in the same manner, starting as shallow and template-like, but being filled with realistic feelings and drawn from the author's and his acquaintances' personal experience. He especially liked contrasting characters whose internal personalities differ from their external portrayal.

=== Development and themes ===
In developing a chapter or story, Akasaka would think about emotions first and then write about experiencing the emotions, such as what Kaguya would feel if she were jealous. He would then arrange the characters and events around that emotion. When he thinks of some emotion that he hasn't developed into a story yet, he writes it on a sticky note or notebook to be used later.

Akasaka said that he originally wanted to make a manga that would help office ladies relax, but since he is an otaku, it seems to follow in that. He also believes the manga is more about providing the reader with something exciting and conveying meaningful messages about human relationships rather than to showcase a number of character gags and reactions. Akasaka said that Kaguya and Miyuki's becoming third-year students marks the second half of the story. When asked about the ending, he said he does not know whether he will go with the bad ending as with Kaguya-hime, but wouldn't mind if it did. He also considered giving each character a curtain call chapter like they do in the dating sims, eventually deciding to do this.

== Media ==
=== Manga ===
Aka Akasaka launched the series in the June issue of Shueisha's seinen manga magazine Miracle Jump on May 19, 2015. The series' last chapter in Miracle Jump was published on January 19, 2016. The manga was then switched to the publisher's Weekly Young Jump magazine on March 24, 2016. A special chapter ran in the debut issue of Young Jump Gold on May 18, 2017. On April 23, 2020, a new manga series, Oshi no Ko, written by Akasaka and illustrated by Mengo Yokoyari, started its serialization in the same magazine, leading to two manga series created by Akasaka being serialized simultaneously. Kaguya would make a cameo in a special chapter of Oshi no Ko. The series finished on November 2, 2022. Shueisha has collected its 281 individual chapters in 28 individual tankōbon volumes. The first volume was released on March 18, 2016, and the last on December 19, 2022.

Viz Media announced during their panel at San Diego Comic-Con on July 20, 2017, that they had licensed the series for a North American release.

A spin-off manga by Shinta Sakayama, titled Kaguya-sama wa Kokurasetai: Dōjin-ban (かぐや様は告らせたい 同人版; transl. 'Lady Kaguya Wants to Make Him Confess – Dōjin Edition'), was launched on Shueisha's Tonari no Young Jump website on June 14, 2018, and it was serialized on the second and fourth Thursdays of the month. The spin-off finished on June 25, 2020. Shueisha released four tankōbon volumes between December 19, 2018, and July 17, 2020.

A yonkoma spin-off, written by G3 Ida and titled Kaguya-sama o Kataritai (かぐや様を語りたい; transl. 'We Want to Talk About Kaguya'), was serialized in Weekly Young Jump from July 26, 2018, to November 2, 2022. The yonkoma focuses on two newspaper/press club girls, Karen Kino and Erika Kose, who idolize Kaguya and the gang but have no clue what really goes on inside the student council. Shueisha released the first collected tankōbon volume on March 19, 2019, and the eighth and last on December 19, 2022.

=== Anime ===
A 12-episode anime television series adaptation, produced by A-1 Pictures, aired in 2019. It was followed by a 12-episode second season, Kaguya-sama: Love Is War?, broadcast in 2020; an original video animation (OVA) episode released in 2021; and a 13-episode third season, Kaguya-sama: Love Is War – Ultra Romantic, broadcast in 2022. A follow-up film, Kaguya-sama: Love Is War – The First Kiss That Never Ends, also premiered in 2022. An anime television special, Kaguya-sama: Love Is War – The Stairway to Adulthood, premiered in 2025. An anime film featuring the original story by Aka Akasaka and serving as the story's conclusion, Kaguya-sama: Love Is War – The Final Chapter, was announced.

=== Live-action film ===
The live-action film adaptation premiered on September 6, 2019. Sho Hirano was announced for the role of Miyuki Shirogane, and Kanna Hashimoto was announced for the role of Kaguya Shinomiya. Hayato Kawai directed the film, Yūichi Tokunaga wrote the screenplay, and principal photography was conducted in March to April 2019.

A sequel, Kaguya-sama Final: Love Is War was announced on January 6, 2021. It premiered in Japanese cinemas on August 20, 2021. Hirano, Hashimoto, Nana Asakawa, and Hayato Sano, actors of Kaguya Shinomiya, Miyuki Shirogane, Chika Fujiwara, and Yu Ishigami respectively, returned to reprise their roles.

=== Novels ===
Two spin-off novels written by Jūichirō Hitsujiyama have been released by Shueisha under their Jump J-Books imprint. The first novel, subtitled Shuchiin Gakuen Nanafushigi (秀知院学園七不思議; lit. 'The Seven Mysteries of Shuchiin Academy'), was released on September 19, 2018. The second novel, subtitled Tensaitachi no Renai Jinrosen (天才たちの恋愛人狼戦; lit. 'The Geniuses' Love Werewolf War'), was released on November 17, 2023.

== Reception ==
The manga won the third Next Manga Award in the comics division for manga published in print book format in 2017. In 2020, along with Aoashi, Kaguya-sama: Love Is War won the 65th Shogakukan Manga Award in the general category. On TV Asahi's Manga Sōsenkyo 2021 poll, in which 150,000 people voted for their top 100 manga series, Kaguya-sama: Love Is War ranked 50th.

Kaguya-sama: Love Is War had over 6.5 million copies in circulation by April 2019; over 8.5 million copies by October 2019; over 9 million copies in circulation by December 2019; over 13 million copies in circulation by October 2020; over 15 million copies in circulation by April 2021; over 19 million copies in circulation by October 2022; and over 22 million copies in circulation by December 2022. It was the ninth-best-selling manga in 2019, with over 4 million copies sold.

Rebecca Silverman of Anime News Network gave the first two volumes of the manga a positive review, calling it "one of the more unique rom-com premises out there". She noted that the second volume was better than the first, indicating development on the part of the author, and commenting that it boded well for the lastingness of the series. She was more ambivalent about the art, saying that it lacked polish and that faces in particular tended to suffer.
