= Kaguya Shinomiya =

Fictional character from Kaguya-sama: Love Is War

- Kaguya-sama: Love Is War character
- Kaguya as she appears in the anime
- First appearance: Kaguya-sama: Love Is War chapter 1: "I Will Make You Invite Me to a Movie", May 19, 2015
- Created by: Aka Akasaka
- Portrayed by: Kanna Hashimoto
- Voiced by: Japanese: Aoi Koga; English: Alexis Tipton

In-universe information
- Position: Student council vice president
- Affiliation: Shuchiin Academy
- Family: Gan'an Shinomiya (father); Nayotake Shimizu (mother, deceased); Oko Shinomiya (half-brother); Un'ya Shinomiya (half-brother)
- Significant others: Miyuki Shirogane (boyfriend, later husband)

Kaguya Shinomiya (Japanese: 四宮 かぐや, Hepburn: Shinomiya Kaguya) is the titular character and protagonist of the manga series Kaguya-sama: Love Is War by Aka Akasaka. She serves as the student council vice president of Shuchiin Academy and comes from the wealthy Shinomiya family. She has feelings for Miyuki Shirogane, the student council president, but is too proud to confess her feelings. Later on in the series, they are able to confess and become a couple, although their relationship is complicated by Kaguya's family circumstances and Miyuki's decision to study abroad at Stanford University.

Akasaka modeled Kaguya's personality on the character of Kaguya-hime from Japanese folklore. He originally had Kaguya and Miyuki have similar personalities, although their characters diverged over time. Kaguya is voiced in Japanese by Aoi Koga and by Alexis Tipton in English. She is portrayed by Kanna Hashimoto in the film adaptations.

Kaguya has been well-received by fans. She has ranked highly in popularity polls and won numerous awards including Best Female Character at the 10th Newtype Anime Awards and Best Girl at the 5th Crunchyroll Anime Awards.

== Creation and development ==
Aka Akasaka said that he modeled Kaguya to be like Kaguya-hime in that both are princesses at the start, but have something deeper about their character later. He made both Kaguya and Miyuki to have similar personalities at first, both proud and intellectual but later revealed to be more like "goofy idiots" on the inside. He would later have the two diverge in tendencies with Kaguya being more like a "bad girl". Akasaka also said that while Kaguya has a dark side to her, he did not want people to hate her so he tried to keep the positive and negative emotions balanced.

=== Actresses ===
Kaguya is voiced by Aoi Koga in Japanese and by Alexis Tipton in English. In a two-part interview with Febri, Koga reminisced about how, during the show's first season, she aimed to do her best in voicing Kaguya so she could not hinder her fellow voice actors. She also felt that during the anime's third season, Kaguya's heart was warming and becoming more similar to a high school girl of her age and Koga wanted to reflect this change with her acting. She also noted that Kaguya also expressed emotions and feelings she did not show during the previous seasons. As the series went on, Koga felt that playing Kaguya allowed her to grow as a person and she could relate to how Kaguya's personality changed between the first and third seasons.

Kaguya is portrayed by Kanna Hashimoto in the film adaptations. Hashimoto was a fan of the manga series and was excited when she was offered the role of Kaguya, believing she could do the role. In portraying the character, Hashimoto wanted to express Kaguya's thoughts and feelings, especially her love for Miyuki and her role as a member of the student council. She admitted it was a challenge to play Kaguya, noting how being a fan of the original manga and how she handled the role were essential in adapting Kaguya to live-action.

== Appearances ==
=== In Kaguya-sama: Love is War ===
Kaguya is the vice president of Shuchiin Academy's student council. She is known for her beauty, intelligence, and wealth, her family owning one of the largest business conglomerates in Japan.^{Ch. 1} Due to being born into a high-class family, the manner Kaguya was raised caused her to be prideful, cold, and calculating, but underneath this, she is really an innocent, kind, and fair-minded teenage girl at heart. Her social status and upbringing also caused her emotional suffering due to loneliness and isolation. In spite of her intelligence and resources, she is surprisingly inept at utilizing social media and digital technology, although she excels at older, analog methods of input such as a typewriter. She is also quite naïve when it comes to romance and sexuality and had to be taught how to utilize fashion and femininity to her advantage. To make Miyuki confess his love directly or indirectly, she usually plans ahead to tilt the circumstances in her favor. Apart from engaging in student council work, she is in the archery club.^{Ch. 28} Although she is left-handed, she writes with her right hand.

Eventually, Kaguya and Miyuki mutually confess their feelings during the school festival, sharing their first kiss as heart-shaped balloons float above the sky. They later have sex for the first time when Kaguya spends the night at the Shirogane family apartment.^{Ch. 220} She is initially disapproving of Miyuki's decision to study at Stanford University but ultimately accepts. She even secretly accompanies him to the United States to bid him a proper farewell and she visits him on a regular basis. She also has plans to study at Stanford after graduating.

It is revealed later in the story that Kaguya was born out of an affair by her father and a prostitute named Nayotake Shimizu, who died less than a month after giving birth to her,^{Ch. 254} and as such would not be considered part of the family by tradition. Despite her father still considering her as much of a member of his family as the rest of his children, she is still treated akin to a political tool by her two oldest brothers.^{Ch. 249}

=== Other appearances ===
Kaguya makes a cameo in a bonus chapter of Oshi no Ko, another manga series by Akasaka, where she serves as Ruby Hoshino's photographer during a shoot. It is implied she has married Miyuki as she is credited under the name Kaguya Shirogane (白銀 輝夜, Shirogane Kaguya).^{Special Chapter}

== Reception ==
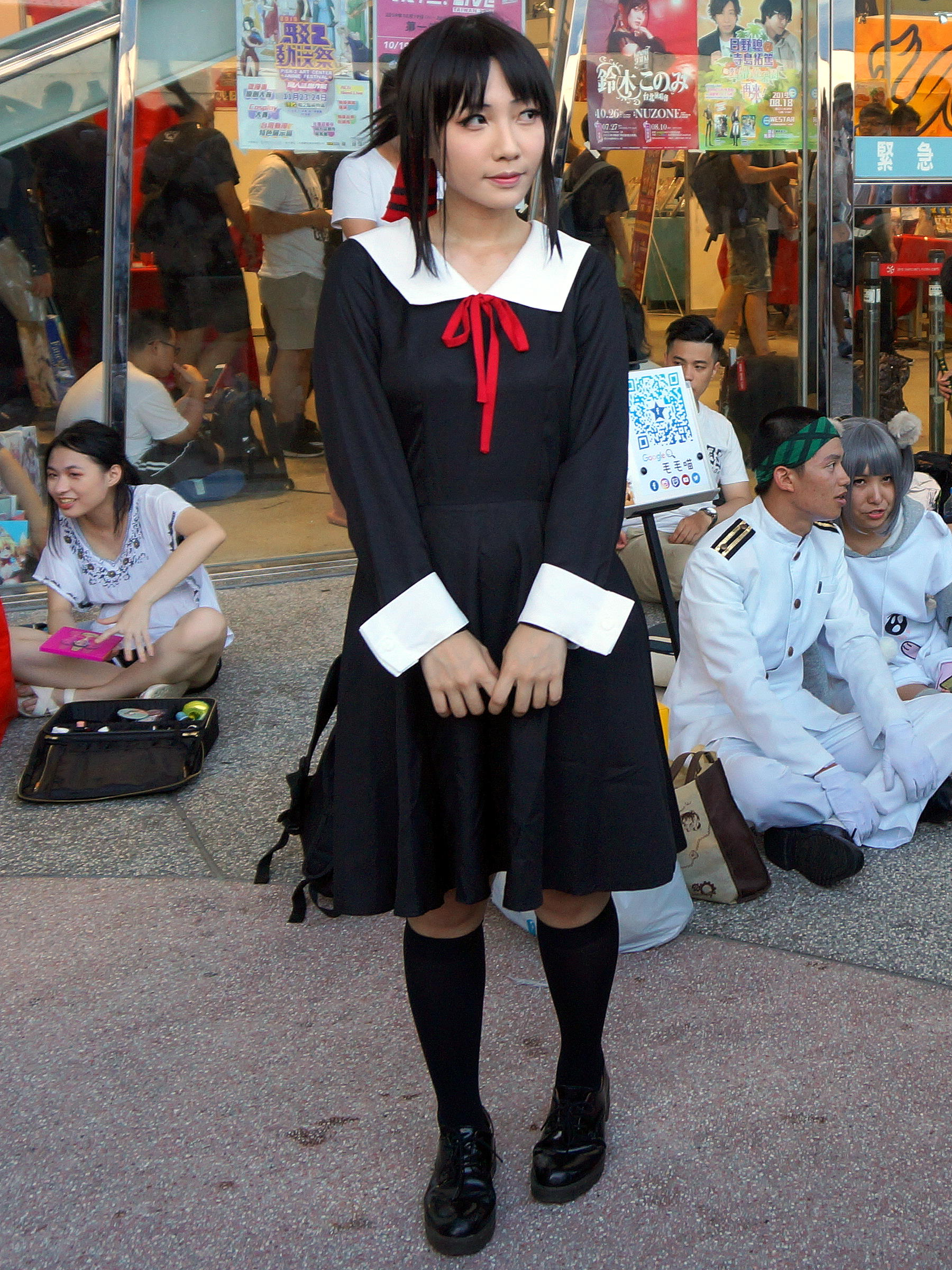
A cosplayer dressed as Kaguya

In a 2019 popularity poll conducted by Akiba Souken, Kaguya ranked first with 3,409 votes. She ranked fourth in a 2021 popularity poll conducted by the website NetLab, with 406 votes and ranked first in a popularity poll among characters voiced by Aoi Koga. At the 4th Crunchyroll Anime Awards, Kaguya and Miyuki Shirogane won the Best Couple award, she won the Best Girl award while she and Miyuki were nominated for Best Couple in the 5th Crunchyroll Anime Awards. Jessica Ángeles was nominated in the Best Voice Artist Performance (Spanish) category for her performance as Kaguya in the 6th Crunchyroll Anime Awards.

Aoi Koga won "Best Actress in a Leading Role" for her work as Kaguya Shinomiya at the 14th Seiyu Awards. Kaguya won Best Female Character at the 10th Newtype Anime Awards. She ranked second in the same award at the 12th Newtype Anime Awards.
