= Nana Asakawa =

Japanese actress (born 1999)

- 浅川 梨奈
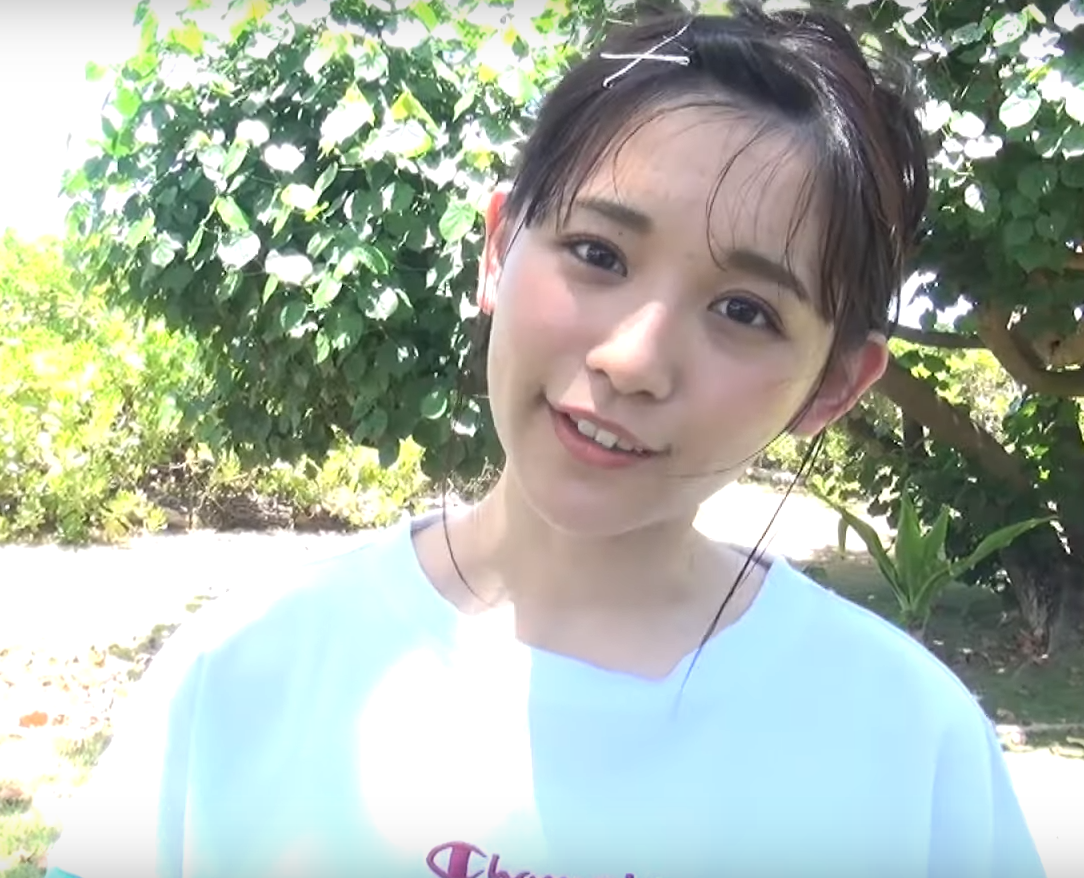
- Asakawa in 2019
- Born: 3 April 1999 (age 27); Saitama Prefecture, Japan
- Other name: Nāpon (なぁぽん)
- Occupations: Actress; Gravure idol
- Years active: 2012–present
- Agent: Avex Vanguard
- Notable work: Kane ga Narishi, Shōjo-tachi wa Jū o Utsu; 14 no Yoru; Saki
- Television: Okinawano no Kowai Hanashi
- Awards: 3rd Cover Girl Grand Prize Comic Category Prize (2017)

Signature
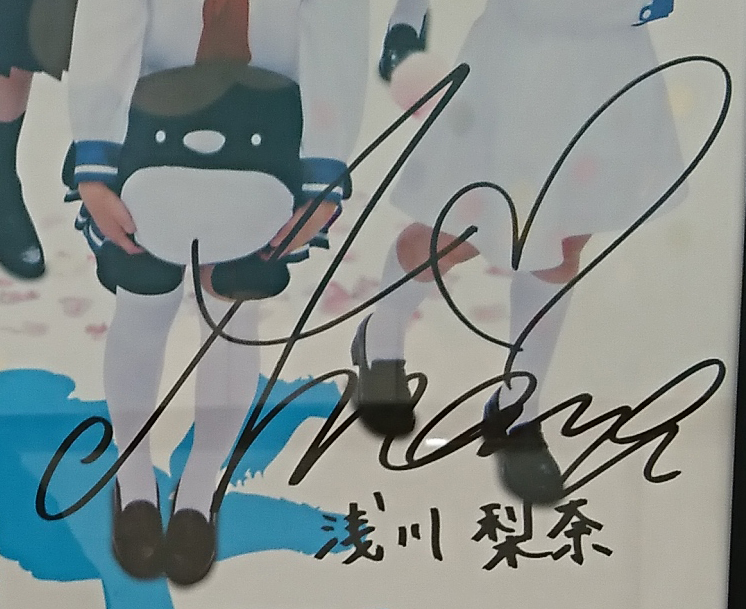

Nana Asakawa (浅川 梨奈, Asakawa Nana; born 3 April 1999) is a Japanese actress, Gravure idol and former singer. She is a former member of Super Girls. She is represented by Avex Vanguard.

== Works ==
=== Participation music ===
Year	Title	Ref.
2014	"Tiara no Jōken"	
2014	"Superstar"	
2014	"Carina Notte Ariete"	
2017	"Kimi ni Waltz/No More Cry"	

== Filmography ==
=== Films ===
Year	Title	Role	Notes	Ref.
2013	girling: short movie hangirl			
	Kane ga Narishi, Shōjo-tachi wa Jū o Utsu	Hinata	Lead role	
2016	14 no Yoru	Megumi Nishino		
2017	Saki	Nodoka Haramura		
2017	Love and Lies	Konatsu		
2018	Honey So Sweet			
2018	Tokyo Living Dead Idol	Miku Kamiya	Lead Role	
2018	Saki Achiga-hen episode of Side-A	Nodoka Haramura		
2019	Kurogarasu Part 1			
2019	Kurogarasu Part 2			
2019	Toshimaen: Haunted Park			
2019	Back Street Girls			
2019	Kaguya-sama: Love Is War	Chika Fujiwara		
2019	Black Maiden: Chapter Q	Mei	Lead role	
2019	Black Maiden: Chapter A	Mei	Lead role	
2021	Kaguya-sama Final: Love Is War	Chika Fujiwara		
2021	Heartbeats			
2022	Kappei	Kumiko		
2023	Adulthood Friends	Mio Kotomori		
2024	Honeko Akabane's Bodyguards	β		
2025	Fake Out	Yui		
2025	49 nichi no Shinjitsu	Madoka Takahashi	Lead role	

=== TV dramas ===
Year	Title	Role	Notes	Ref.
2013	The Case Files of Biblia Bookstore		Episode 5	
2013	Kasukana Kanojo	Nanako Higashikawa		
2015	Okinawano no Kowai Hanashi: Summer 2015		Lead role; episode 1	
2016	Saki	Nodoka Haramura		
2017	& Bishōjo: Next Girl meets Tokyo			
2017	Five	Hina Aso		
2022	Harem Marriage	Madoka Date		
2022	One Night Morning	Onigashima	Lead role; episode 3	
2026	Viral Hit			

=== Other TV programs ===
Year	Title	Notes	Ref.
2013	Cheeky Parade Dokusen Mitchaku: Idol Zensen Kōshin-chū!		
2013	Copinkss! Stories		
2015	Strige! Valentine Dai Sakusen		
2015	Pink!SS		

=== Advertisements ===
Year	Title	Ref.
2013	Fiace Home Daijinamono	
2016	Universal Studios Japan Universal Cool Japan 2017/Mei Tantei Conan The Escape	

=== Stage ===
Year	Title	Role	Ref.
2012	Mōsō Girls		
2012	Doubt! Kokuritsu Kōan Joshikō		
2013	Kankin!?		
2013	Super World –Kanojo-tachi no Bōken–	Envy	
2015	Za Hana Miyo Concerto	Kaede	

=== Image character ===
Year	Title	Ref
2013	Fiace Home	
2013	Shizoka Asahi Television Jōhō Bangumi Pink!SS Copinkss Image Character "2-Daime Copink"	

== Bibliography ==
=== Photo albums ===
Year	Title	Ref.
2017	Nanairo	

=== Newspaper columns ===
Year	Title
2012	Yūkan Fuji "Otsukare-sama"
2014	Idol Yokochō Shinbun: Aru aru City Kawaraban "Super Girls Nana Asakawa Idol nanoni Idol Otaku!?"

== Awards ==
Year	Ceremony	Award	Result	Ref.
2017	3rd Cover Girl Grand Prize	Category Prize	Won	
