= List of Kaguya-sama: Love Is War episodes =

Promotional artwork for the first season of the anime

Kaguya-sama: Love Is War is a Japanese anime television series based on Aka Akasaka's Kaguya-sama: Love Is War manga series. The anime television series adaptation was announced by Shueisha on June 1, 2018. The series was directed by Shinichi Omata under the pseudonym Mamoru Hatakeyama and written by Yasuhiro Nakanishi, with animation by A-1 Pictures. Yuuko Yahiro provided the character designs, while Jin Aketagawa served the sound director and Kei Haneoka composed the series' music. The series aired from January 12 to March 30, 2019, broadcasting on MBS, Tokyo MX, BS11, GTV, GYT, CTV, and TeNY. The series ran for 12 episodes. Aniplex of America have acquired the series in North America, and streamed the series on Crunchyroll, Hulu, and FunimationNow. In Australia and New Zealand, AnimeLab simulcasted the series within the region.

A second season titled Kaguya-sama: Love Is War? was announced on October 19, 2019. The staff and cast returned to reprise their roles. The season aired from April 11 to June 27, 2020, on the same Japanese stations as the first, though its world premiere took place prior to Japanese broadcast at Anime Festival Sydney on March 8, 2020.

On October 25, 2020, an original video animation and a third season were announced for production during the "Kaguya-sama Wants To Tell You On Stage" special event. The OVA was bundled with the manga's twenty-second volume, which was released on May 19, 2021. The third season titled Kaguya-sama: Love Is War – Ultra Romantic premiered on April 9, 2022, with returning staff and cast members.

Following the conclusion of the third season, a new anime project was announced. It was later revealed to be an anime film, titled Kaguya-sama: Love Is War – The First Kiss That Never Ends which released in theatres on December 17, 2022.

An anime television special, Kaguya-sama: Love Is War – The Stairway to Adulthood, was announced in June 2025. The anime special premiered on December 31 of the same year, with the staff and cast reprised their roles. The opening theme song is "Abunai Kioku" (アブナイキオク; lit. 'Dangerous Memory') by Masayuki Suzuki feat. Aoi Koga.

After the airing of The Stairway to Adulthood television special, an anime film featuring the original story by Aka Akasaka and serving as the story's conclusion, Kaguya-sama: Love Is War – The Final Chapter, was announced.

== Series overview ==
Season	Episodes	Originally released	
Season	Episodes	First released	Last released
1	12	January 12, 2019	March 30, 2019
2	12	April 11, 2020	June 27, 2020
3	13	April 9, 2022	June 25, 2022
Film		December 17, 2022	
Special		December 31, 2025	
Film		TBA	

== Episodes ==
=== Season 1 (2019) ===
Story	Episode	Title	Directed by	Written by	Original release date
1	1	"I Want to Make You Invite Me to a Movie"; Transliteration: "Eiga ni Sasowasetai" (Japanese: 映画に誘わせたい)	Yūjirō Abe	Yasuhiro Nakanishi	January 12, 2019
1	1	"Kaguya Wants You to Stop Her"; Transliteration: "Kaguya-sama wa Tomeraretai" (Japanese: かぐや様は止められたい)	Yūjirō Abe	Yasuhiro Nakanishi	January 12, 2019
1	1	"Kaguya Wants You to Offer Her Food"; Transliteration: "Kaguya-sama wa Itadakitai" (Japanese: かぐや様はいただきたい)	Yūjirō Abe	Yasuhiro Nakanishi	January 12, 2019
2	2	"Kaguya Wants to Exchange Contact Info"; Transliteration: "Kaguya-sama wa Kōkan Shitai" (Japanese: かぐや様は交換したい)	Tarō Kubo	Yasuhiro Nakanishi	January 19, 2019
2	2	"Fujiwara Wants to Go Out"; Transliteration: "Fujiwara-chan wa Dekaketai" (Japanese: 藤原ちゃんは出かけたい)	Tarō Kubo	Yasuhiro Nakanishi	January 19, 2019
2	2	"Miyuki Shirogane Wants to Hide It"; Transliteration: "Shirogane Miyuki wa Kakushitai" (Japanese: 白銀御行は隠したい)	Tarō Kubo	Yasuhiro Nakanishi	January 19, 2019
3	3	"Miyuki Shirogane Still Hasn't Done It"; Transliteration: "Shirogane Miyuki wa Mada Shitenai" (Japanese: 白銀御行はまだしてない)	Isono	Yukie Sugawara	January 26, 2019
3	3	"Kaguya Wants Him to Guess Right"; Transliteration: "Kaguya-sama wa Ateraretai" (Japanese: かぐや様は当てられたい)	Isono	Yukie Sugawara	January 26, 2019
3	3	"Kaguya Wants to Walk"; Transliteration: "Kaguya-sama wa Arukitai" (Japanese: かぐや様は歩きたい)	Isono	Yukie Sugawara	January 26, 2019
4	4	"Kaguya Wants Affection"; Transliteration: "Kaguya-sama wa Medetai" (Japanese: かぐや様は愛でたい)	Masaki Utsunomiya	Yukie Sugawara	February 2, 2019
4	4	"The Student Council Wants To Make Each Other Say It"; Transliteration: "Seitokai wa Iwasetai" (Japanese: 生徒会は言わせたい)	Masaki Utsunomiya	Yukie Sugawara	February 2, 2019
4	4	"Kaguya Wants To Make Him Send It"; Transliteration: "Kaguya-sama wa Okurasetai" (Japanese: かぐや様は送らせたい)	Masaki Utsunomiya	Yukie Sugawara	February 2, 2019
4	4	"Miyuki Shirogane Wants To Speak"; Transliteration: "Shirogane Miyuki wa Hanashitai" (Japanese: 白銀御行は話したい)	Masaki Utsunomiya	Yukie Sugawara	February 2, 2019
5	5	"Kaguya Wants to Handle It"; Transliteration: "Kaguya-sama wa Konashitai" (Japanese: かぐや様はこなしたい)	Tsuyoshi Tobita	Yasuhiro Nakanishi	February 9, 2019
5	5	"Miyuki Shirogane Wants to Show Off"; Transliteration: "Shirogane Miyuki wa Misetsuketai" (Japanese: 白銀御行は見せつけたい)	Tsuyoshi Tobita	Yasuhiro Nakanishi	February 9, 2019
5	5	"Kaguya Wants to Be Covered"; Transliteration: "Kaguya-sama wa Sasaretai" (Japanese: かぐや様は差されたい)	Tsuyoshi Tobita	Yasuhiro Nakanishi	February 9, 2019
6	6	"Yu Ishigami Wants to Live"; Transliteration: "Ishigami Yū wa Ikinobitai" (Japanese: 石上優は生き延びたい)	Takayuki Kikuchi	Yukie Sugawara	February 16, 2019
6	6	"Chika Fujiwara Wants to Test You"; Transliteration: "Fujiwara Chika wa Tesuto-shitai" (Japanese: 藤原千花はテストしたい)	Takayuki Kikuchi	Yukie Sugawara	February 16, 2019
6	6	"Kaguya Wants to Be Noticed"; Transliteration: "Kaguya-sama wa Kizukaretai" (Japanese: かぐや様は気づかれたい)	Takayuki Kikuchi	Yukie Sugawara	February 16, 2019
7	7	"Miyuki Shirogane Wants to Work"; Transliteration: "Shirogane Miyuki wa Hatarakitai" (Japanese: 白銀御行は働きたい)	Yūjirō Abe	Yasuhiro Nakanishi	February 23, 2019
7	7	"Kaguya Wants Him to Join In"; Transliteration: "Kaguya-sama wa Iretai" (Japanese: かぐや様は入れたい)	Yūjirō Abe	Yasuhiro Nakanishi	February 23, 2019
7	7	"Kaguya Wants to Control It"; Transliteration: "Kaguya-sama wa Taetai" (Japanese: かぐや様は堪えたい)	Yūjirō Abe	Yasuhiro Nakanishi	February 23, 2019
8	8	"Kaguya Wants Her to Say It"; Transliteration: "Kaguya-sama wa Yobasetai" (Japanese: かぐや様は呼ばせたい)	Tarō Kubo	Yasuhiro Nakanishi	March 2, 2019
8	8	"Miyuki Shirogane Can't Lose"; Transliteration: "Shirogane Miyuki wa Makerarenai" (Japanese: 白銀御行は負けられない)	Tarō Kubo	Yasuhiro Nakanishi	March 2, 2019
8	8	"Yu Ishigami Closes His Eyes"; Transliteration: "Soshite Ishigami Yū wa Me o Tojita" (Japanese: そして石上優は目を閉じた)	Tarō Kubo	Yasuhiro Nakanishi	March 2, 2019
9	9	"Kaguya Wants to Give a Gift"; Transliteration: "Kaguya-sama wa Okuritai" (Japanese: かぐや様は送りたい)	Masakazu Obara	Yukie Sugawara	March 9, 2019
9	9	"Chika Fujiwara Wants to Pay a Visit"; Transliteration: "Fujiwara Chika wa Mimaitai" (Japanese: 藤原千花は見舞いたい)	Masakazu Obara	Yukie Sugawara	March 9, 2019
9	9	"About Kaguya Shinomiya, Part 1"; Transliteration: "Shinomiya Kaguya ni tsuite 1" (Japanese: 四宮かぐやについて①)	Masakazu Obara	Yukie Sugawara	March 9, 2019
10	10	"Kaguya Won't Forgive"; Transliteration: "Kaguya-sama wa Yurusenai" (Japanese: かぐや様は許せない)	Tsuyoshi Tobita	Yasuhiro Nakanishi	March 16, 2019
10	10	"Kaguya Wants to Forgive"; Transliteration: "Kaguya-sama wa Yurushitai" (Japanese: かぐや様は許したい)	Tsuyoshi Tobita	Yasuhiro Nakanishi	March 16, 2019
10	10	"Miyuki Shirogane Wants to Go Somewhere"; Transliteration: "Shirogane Miyuki wa Dekaketai" (Japanese: 白銀御行は出かけたい)	Tsuyoshi Tobita	Yasuhiro Nakanishi	March 16, 2019
11	11	"Ai Hayasaka Wants to Get Soaked"; Transliteration: "Hayasaka Ai wa Tsukaritai" (Japanese: 早坂愛は浸かりたい)	Aya Ikeda	Yasuhiro Nakanishi	March 23, 2019
11	11	"Chika Fujiwara Really Wants to Eat It"; Transliteration: "Fujiwara Chika wa Chō Tabetai" (Japanese: 藤原千花は超食べたい)	Aya Ikeda	Yasuhiro Nakanishi	March 23, 2019
11	11	"Miyuki Shirogane Wants to See You"; Transliteration: "Shirogane Miyuki wa Deaitai" (Japanese: 白銀御行は出会いたい)	Aya Ikeda	Yasuhiro Nakanishi	March 23, 2019
11	11	"I Can't Hear the Fireworks, Part 1"; Transliteration: "Hanabi no Oto wa Kikoenai, Zenpen" (Japanese: 花火の音は聞こえない 前編)	Aya Ikeda	Yasuhiro Nakanishi	March 23, 2019
12	12	"I Can't Hear the Fireworks, Part 2"; Transliteration: "Hanabi no Oto wa Kikoenai, Kōhen" (Japanese: 花火の音は聞こえない 後編)	Takayuki Kikuchi	Yukie Sugawara	March 30, 2019
12	12	"Kaguya Doesn't Want to Avoid Him"; Transliteration: "Kaguya-sama wa Saketakunai" (Japanese: かぐや様は避けたくない)	Shinichi Omata	Yukie Sugawara	March 30, 2019

=== Season 2: Love Is War? (2020) ===
Story	Episode	Title	Directed by	Written by	Original release date
13	1	"Ai Hayasaka Wants to Stave Them Off"; Transliteration: "Hayasaka Ai wa Fusegitai" (Japanese: 早坂愛は防ぎたい)	Tsuyoshi Tobita	Yasuhiro Nakanishi	April 11, 2020
13	1	"The Student Council Has Not Achieved Nirvana"; Transliteration: "Seitokai wa Kamittenai" (Japanese: 生徒会は神ってない)	Tsuyoshi Tobita	Yasuhiro Nakanishi	April 11, 2020
13	1	"Kaguya Wants to Get Married"; Transliteration: "Kaguya-sama wa Kekkonshitai" (Japanese: かぐや様は結婚したい)	Tsuyoshi Tobita	Yasuhiro Nakanishi	April 11, 2020
13	1	"Kaguya Wants to Celebrate"; Transliteration: "Kaguya-sama wa Iwaitai" (Japanese: かぐや様は祝いたい)	Tsuyoshi Tobita	Yasuhiro Nakanishi	April 11, 2020
14	2	"Kaguya Wants to Know"; Transliteration: "Kaguya-sama wa Kikidashitai" (Japanese: かぐや様は聞き出したい)	Tarō Kubo	Yasuhiro Nakanishi	April 18, 2020
14	2	"Kaguya Wants to Give a Gift"; Transliteration: "Kaguya-sama wa Okuritai" (Japanese: かぐや様は贈りたい)	Tarō Kubo	Yasuhiro Nakanishi	April 18, 2020
14	2	"Chika Fujiwara Wants to Confirm It"; Transliteration: "Fujiwara Chika wa Tashikametai" (Japanese: 藤原千花は確かめたい)	Tarō Kubo	Yasuhiro Nakanishi	April 18, 2020
15	3	"Miyuki Shirogane Wants to Gaze at the Moon"; Transliteration: "Shirogane Miyuki wa Miagetai" (Japanese: 白銀御行は見上げたい)	Abe Yūjirō	Yukie Sugawara	April 25, 2020
15	3	"The 67th Student Council"; Transliteration: "Dai 67-ki Seitokai" (Japanese: 第67期生徒会)	Abe Yūjirō	Yukie Sugawara	April 25, 2020
15	3	"Kaguya Doesn't Want to Say It"; Transliteration: "Kaguya-sama wa Yobitakunai" (Japanese: かぐや様は呼びたくない)	Abe Yūjirō	Yukie Sugawara	April 25, 2020
16	4	"Ai Hayasaka Wants Him to Fall for Her"; Transliteration: "Hayasaka Ai wa Otoshitai" (Japanese: 早坂愛はオトしたい)	Aya Ikeda	Yukie Sugawara	May 2, 2020
16	4	"Kaguya Wants to Be Confessed To"; Transliteration: "Kaguya-sama wa Kokura"re"tai" (Japanese: かぐや様は告ら“れ”たい)	Aya Ikeda	Yukie Sugawara	May 2, 2020
16	4	"Miko Iino Wants to Set Things Right"; Transliteration: "Iino Miko wa Tadashitai" (Japanese: 伊井野ミコは正したい)	Aya Ikeda	Yukie Sugawara	May 2, 2020
17	5	"Miyuki Shirogane Wants Girls to Fall for Him"; Transliteration: "Shirogane Miyuki wa Motetai" (Japanese: 白銀御行はモテたい)	Takayuki Kikuchi	Yasuhiro Nakanishi	May 9, 2020
17	5	"Nagisa Kashiwagi Wants to Console"; Transliteration: "Kashiwagi Nagisa wa Nagusametai" (Japanese: 柏木渚は慰めたい)	Takayuki Kikuchi	Yasuhiro Nakanishi	May 9, 2020
17	5	"Miyuki Shirogane Wants to Sing"; Transliteration: "Shirogane Miyuki wa Utaitai" (Japanese: 白銀御行は歌いたい)	Takayuki Kikuchi	Yasuhiro Nakanishi	May 9, 2020
17	5	"Kaguya Wants to Kick Them Down"; Transliteration: "Kaguya-sama wa Keotoshitai" (Japanese: かぐや様は蹴落としたい)	Takayuki Kikuchi	Yasuhiro Nakanishi	May 9, 2020
18	6	"I Don't Want to Make Miko Iino Smile"; Transliteration: "Iino Miko o Warawasenai" (Japanese: 伊井野ミコを笑わせない)	Kuniyasu Nishina	Yasuhiro Nakanishi	May 16, 2020
18	6	"I Want to Make Miko Iino Smile"; Transliteration: "Iino Miko o Warawasetai" (Japanese: 伊井野ミコを笑わせたい)	Kuniyasu Nishina	Yasuhiro Nakanishi	May 16, 2020
18	6	"Kaguya Isn't Getting Called"; Transliteration: "Kaguya-sama wa Yobarenai" (Japanese: かぐや様は呼ばれない)	Kuniyasu Nishina	Yasuhiro Nakanishi	May 16, 2020
19	7	"Kaguya Wants to Undress Him"; Transliteration: "Kaguya-sama wa Nugasetai" (Japanese: かぐや様は脱がせたい)	Aya Ikeda	Yukie Sugawara	May 23, 2020
19	7	"Kaguya Wants to Make Him Let Go"; Transliteration: "Kaguya-sama wa Dasasetai" (Japanese: かぐや様は出させたい)	Aya Ikeda	Yukie Sugawara	May 23, 2020
19	7	"Miyuki Shirogane Wants to Make Her Read"; Transliteration: "Shirogane Miyuki wa Yomasetai" (Japanese: 白銀御行は読ませたい)	Aya Ikeda	Yukie Sugawara	May 23, 2020
19	7	"Kaguya ♡ Aquarium"; Transliteration: "Kaguya-sama ♡ Akuariumu" (Japanese: かぐや様♡アクアリウム)	Aya Ikeda	Yukie Sugawara	May 23, 2020
20	8	"Miko Iino Wants to Control Herself"; Transliteration: "Iino Miko wa Osaetai" (Japanese: 伊井野ミコは抑えたい)	Tsuyoshi Tobita	Yukie Sugawara	May 30, 2020
20	8	"Kaguya Doesn't Scare Easily"; Transliteration: "Kaguya-sama wa Obienai" (Japanese: かぐや様は怯えない)	Tsuyoshi Tobita	Yukie Sugawara	May 30, 2020
20	8	"Kaguya Wants to Be Examined"; Transliteration: "Kaguya-sama wa Miraretai" (Japanese: かぐや様は診られたい)	Tsuyoshi Tobita	Yukie Sugawara	May 30, 2020
21	9	"Yu Ishigami Closes His Eyes, Part 2"; Transliteration: "Soshite Ishigami Yū wa Me o Tojita 2" (Japanese: そして石上優は目を閉じた②)	Ryota Aikei	Yasuhiro Nakanishi	June 6, 2020
21	9	"Kaguya Wants to Touch"; Transliteration: "Kaguya-sama wa Sawaritai" (Japanese: かぐや様は触りたい)	Ryota Aikei	Yasuhiro Nakanishi	June 6, 2020
21	9	"Kaguya Doesn't Say No"; Transliteration: "Kaguya-sama wa Kotowaranai" (Japanese: かぐや様は断らない)	Ryota Aikei	Yasuhiro Nakanishi	June 6, 2020
22	10	"Kei Shirogane Can't Speak"; Transliteration: "Shirogane Kei wa Hanasenai" (Japanese: 白銀圭は話せない)	Takayuki Kikuchi	Yukie Sugawara	June 13, 2020
22	10	"Miyuki Shirogane Wants to Dance"; Transliteration: "Shirogane Miyuki wa Odoritai" (Japanese: 白銀御行は踊りたい)	Takayuki Kikuchi	Yukie Sugawara	June 13, 2020
22	10	"Kobachi Osaragi Wants to Crack Down"; Transliteration: "Osaragi Kobachi wa Torishimaritai" (Japanese: 大仏こばちは取り締まりたい)	Takayuki Kikuchi	Yukie Sugawara	June 13, 2020
22	10	"Miyuki Shirogane's Dad Wants to Find Out"; Transliteration: "Shirogane Chichi wa Kikidashitai" (Japanese: 白銀父は聞き出したい)	Takayuki Kikuchi	Yukie Sugawara	June 13, 2020
23	11	"Yu Ishigami Closes His Eyes, Part 3"; Transliteration: "Soshite Ishigami Yū wa Me o Tojita 3" (Japanese: そして石上優は目を閉じた③)	Suzuki Moe	Yukie Sugawara	June 20, 2020
23	11	"Miyuki Shirogane and Yu Ishigami"; Transliteration: "Shirogane Miyuki to Ishigami Yū" (Japanese: 白銀御行と石上優)	Suzuki Moe	Yukie Sugawara	June 20, 2020
23	11	"Kyoko Otomo Doesn't Realize"; Transliteration: "Otomo Kyōko wa Kizukanai" (Japanese: 大友京子は気づかない)	Suzuki Moe	Yukie Sugawara	June 20, 2020
24	12	"The Student Council Would Like a Group Photo"; Transliteration: "Seitokai wa Toraretai" (Japanese: 生徒会は撮られたい)	Abe Yujiro	Yasuhiro Nakanishi	June 27, 2020
24	12	"The Student Council is Going to Get That Group Photo"; Transliteration: "Seitokai wa Torasetai" (Japanese: 生徒会は撮らせたい)	Abe Yujiro	Yasuhiro Nakanishi	June 27, 2020
24	12	"Chika Fujiwara Wants to Inflate"; Transliteration: "Fujiwara Chika wa Fukuramasetai" (Japanese: 藤原千花は膨らませたい)	Abe Yujiro	Yasuhiro Nakanishi	June 27, 2020

=== Season 3: Love Is War – Ultra Romantic (2022) ===
Story	Episode	Title	Directed by	Written by	Original release date
25	1	"Miko Iino Wants to Be Soothed"; Transliteration: "Iino Miko wa Iyasaretai" (Japanese: 伊井野ミコは癒されたい)	Mamoru Hatakeyama	Yasuhiro Nakanishi	April 9, 2022
25	1	"Kaguya Doesn't Realize"; Transliteration: "Kaguya-sama wa Kizukanai" (Japanese: かぐや様は気づかない)	Mamoru Hatakeyama	Yasuhiro Nakanishi	April 9, 2022
25	1	"Chika Fujiwara Wants to Battle"; Transliteration: "Fujiwara Chika wa Tatakaitai" (Japanese: 藤原千花は闘いたい)	Takayuki Kikuchi	Yasuhiro Nakanishi	April 9, 2022
26	2	"Miyuki Shirogane Wants to Mediate"; Transliteration: "Shirogane Miyuki wa Torimochitai" (Japanese: 白銀御行は取り持ちたい)	Masakazu Obara	Yasuhiro Nakanishi	April 16, 2022
26	2	"Kaguya Wants to Distract Him"; Transliteration: "Kaguya-sama wa Tsuredashitai" (Japanese: かぐや様は連れ出したい)	Masakazu Obara	Yasuhiro Nakanishi	April 16, 2022
26	2	"Kaguya Preemptively Strikes"; Transliteration: "Kaguya-sama wa Soshishitai" (Japanese: かぐや様は阻止したい)	Masakazu Obara	Yasuhiro Nakanishi	April 16, 2022
27	3	"Nagisa Kashiwagi Wants to Kill"; Transliteration: "Kashiwagi Nagisa wa Chūshitai" (Japanese: 柏木渚は誅したい)	Aya Ikeda	Yukie Sugawara	April 23, 2022
27	3	"Maki Shijo Wants to Take Action"; Transliteration: "Shijō Maki wa Nantoka Shitai" (Japanese: 四条眞妃は何とかしたい)	Aya Ikeda	Yukie Sugawara	April 23, 2022
27	3	"Miyuki Shirogane Wants to Be Believed"; Transliteration: "Shirogane Miyuki wa Shinjiraretai" (Japanese: 白銀御行は信じられたい)	Aya Ikeda	Yukie Sugawara	April 23, 2022
28	4	"Kaguya Shinomiya's Impossible Demand: "A Cowrie a Swallow Gave Birth To" Part 1"; Transliteration: "Shinomiya Kaguya no Muri Nandai "Tsubame no Koyasugai" Hen Ichi" (Japanese: 四宮かぐやの無理難題「燕の子安貝」編①)	Tsuyoshi Tobita	Yukie Sugawara	April 30, 2022
28	4	"Yu Ishigami Wants to Prove Himself Worthy"; Transliteration: "Ishigami Yū wa Kotaetai" (Japanese: 石上優はこたえたい)	Tsuyoshi Tobita	Yukie Sugawara	April 30, 2022
28	4	"Chika Fujiwara Wants to Stay Over"; Transliteration: "Fujiwara Chika wa Tomaritai" (Japanese: 藤原千花は泊まりたい)	Tsuyoshi Tobita	Yukie Sugawara	April 30, 2022
29	5	"Chika Fujiwara Wants to Beat a Rhythm"; Transliteration: "Fujiwara Chika wa Kizamitai" (Japanese: 藤原千花は刻みたい)	Takayuki Kikuchi	Yasuhiro Nakanishi	May 7, 2022
29	5	"Ai Hayasaka Wants to Talk"; Transliteration: "Hayasaka Ai wa Hanashitai" (Japanese: 早坂愛は話したい)	Takayuki Kikuchi	Yasuhiro Nakanishi	May 7, 2022
29	5	"Maki Shijo Wants Some Help"; Transliteration: "Shijō Maki wa Tayoritai" (Japanese: 四条眞妃は頼りたい)	Takayuki Kikuchi	Yasuhiro Nakanishi	May 7, 2022
30	6	"The Student Council Wants to Move Forward"; Transliteration: "Seitokai wa Susumitai" (Japanese: 生徒会は進みたい)	Motoki Nakanishi	Yasuhiro Nakanishi	May 14, 2022
30	6	"Miyuki Shirogane Wants to Make Her Confess, Part 2"; Transliteration: "Shirogane Miyuki wa Kokurasetai Ni" (Japanese: 白銀御行は告らせたい②)	Motoki Nakanishi	Yasuhiro Nakanishi	May 14, 2022
30	6	"Miyuki Shirogane Wants to Make Her Confess, Part 3"; Transliteration: "Shirogane Miyuki wa Kokurasetai San" (Japanese: 白銀御行は告らせたい③)	Motoki Nakanishi	Yasuhiro Nakanishi	May 14, 2022
31	7	"Miko Iino Can't Love, Part 1"; Transliteration: "Iino Miko wa Aisenai Ichi" (Japanese: 伊井野ミコは愛せない①)	Yuki Watanabe	Yukie Sugawara	May 21, 2022
31	7	"Students Wish to Discuss the Culture Festival"; Transliteration: "Bunkasai o Kataritai" (Japanese: 文化祭を語りたい)	Yuki Watanabe	Yukie Sugawara	May 21, 2022
31	7	"Miyuki Shirogane Wants to Blow It Up"; Transliteration: "Shirogane Miyuki wa Fukuramasetai" (Japanese: 白銀御行は膨らませたい)	Yuki Watanabe	Yukie Sugawara	May 21, 2022
32	8	"Kei Shirogane Wants to Show Off"; Transliteration: "Shirogane Kei wa Misetsuketai" (Japanese: 白銀圭は見せつけたい)	Nobukage Kimura	Yukie Sugawara	May 28, 2022
32	8	"About Kaguya Shinomiya, Part 2"; Transliteration: "Shinomiya Kaguya ni Tsuite Ni" (Japanese: 四宮かぐやについて②)	Nobukage Kimura	Yukie Sugawara	May 28, 2022
32	8	"Kaguya Wants to Confess"; Transliteration: "Kaguya-sama wa Tsugeritai" (Japanese: かぐや様は告りたい)	Nobukage Kimura	Yukie Sugawara	May 28, 2022
33	9	"Spring of First Year"; Transliteration: "Ichinensei Haru" (Japanese: 1年生 春)	Motoki Nakanishi	Yasuhiro Nakanishi	June 4, 2022
33	9	"Kaguya's Culture Festival"; Transliteration: "Kaguya-sama no Bunkasai" (Japanese: かぐや様の文化祭)	Motoki Nakanishi	Yasuhiro Nakanishi	June 4, 2022
33	9	"Yu Ishigami's Culture Festival"; Transliteration: "Ishigami Yū no Bunkasai" (Japanese: 石上優の文化祭)	Motoki Nakanishi	Yasuhiro Nakanishi	June 4, 2022
34	10	"Kozue Makihara Wants to Have Fun"; Transliteration: "Makihara Kozue wa Asobitai" (Japanese: 槇原こずえは遊びたい)	Shōtarō Kitamura	Yasuhiro Nakanishi	June 11, 2022
34	10	"Chika Fujiwara Wants to Unmask"; Transliteration: "Fujiwara Chika wa Abakitai" (Japanese: 藤原千花は暴きたい)	Shōtarō Kitamura	Yasuhiro Nakanishi	June 11, 2022
34	10	"Miyuki Shirogane's Culture Festival"; Transliteration: "Shirogane Miyuki no Bunkasai" (Japanese: 白銀御行の文化祭)	Shōtarō Kitamura	Yasuhiro Nakanishi	June 11, 2022
35	11	"Miyuki Shirogane Wants to Make Her Confess, Part 4"; Transliteration: "Shirogane Miyuki wa Kokurasetai Yon" (Japanese: 白銀御行は告らせたい④)	Ryōta Aikei	Yukie Sugawara	June 18, 2022
35	11	"Tsubame Koyasu Wants to Say No"; Transliteration: "Koyasu Tsubame wa Kotowaritai" (Japanese: 子安つばめは断りたい)	Ryōta Aikei	Yukie Sugawara	June 18, 2022
35	11	"Miyuki Shirogane Wants to Make Her Confess, Part 5"; Transliteration: "Shirogane Miyuki wa Kokurasetai Go" (Japanese: 白銀御行は告らせたい⑤)	Ryōta Aikei	Yukie Sugawara	June 18, 2022
36	12	"Kaguya Wants to Confess, Part 2"; Transliteration: "Kaguya-sama wa Tsugeritai Ni" (Japanese: かぐや様は告りたい②)	Tsuyoshi Tobita	Yasuhiro Nakanishi	June 25, 2022
36	12	"Kaguya Wants to Confess, Part 3"; Transliteration: "Kaguya-sama wa Tsugeritai San" (Japanese: かぐや様は告りたい③)	Tsuyoshi Tobita	Yasuhiro Nakanishi	June 25, 2022
36	12	"Dual Confessions, Part 1"; Transliteration: ""Futatsu no Kokuhaku" Zenpen" (Japanese: 「二つの告白」前編)	Tsuyoshi Tobita	Yasuhiro Nakanishi	June 25, 2022
37	13	"Dual Confessions, Part 2"; Transliteration: ""Futatsu no Kokuhaku" Kōhen" (Japanese: 「二つの告白」後編)	Takayuki Kikuchi	Yasuhiro Nakanishi	June 25, 2022
37	13	"The Shuchiin Afterparty"; Transliteration: "Shuchiin wa Matsuri" (Japanese: 秀知院は後夜祭)	Takayuki Kikuchi	Yasuhiro Nakanishi	June 25, 2022

=== Kaguya-sama: Love Is War – The First Kiss That Never Ends (2022) ===
The episodes listed below are split up segments from the original December 2022 theatrical release of Kaguya-sama: Love Is War – The First Kiss That Never Ends, meant for televised broadcasts and streaming releases.

Story	Episode	Title	Directed by	Written by	Original release date
38	1	"Miyuki Shirogane Wants to Talk Things Over"; Transliteration: "Shirogane Miyuki wa Katariaitai" (Japanese: 白銀御行は語り合いたい)	Masakazu Ohara	Yasuhiro Nakanishi	April 1, 2023
38	1	"Miko Iino Wants to Talk"; Transliteration: "Iino Miko wa Kataritai" (Japanese: 伊井野ミコは語りたい)	Masakazu Ohara	Yasuhiro Nakanishi	April 1, 2023
38	1	"About Kaguya Shinomiya, Part 3"; Transliteration: "Shinomiya Kaguya ni Tsuite San" (Japanese: 四宮かぐやについて③)	Masakazu Ohara	Yasuhiro Nakanishi	April 1, 2023
39	2	"About Kaguya Shinomiya, Part 4"; Transliteration: "Shinomiya Kaguya ni Tsuite Yon" (Japanese: 四宮かぐやについて④)	Takayuki Kikuchi	Yasuhiro Nakanishi	April 1, 2023
39	2	"Kaguya Wants to be Noticed (Ice)"; Transliteration: "Kaguya-sama wa Kizukaretai（Kōri）" (Japanese: かぐや様は気づかれたい（氷）)	Takayuki Kikuchi	Yasuhiro Nakanishi	April 1, 2023
39	2	"Kaguya Wants to Forgive (Ice)"; Transliteration: "Kaguya-sama wa Yurushitai（Kōri）" (Japanese: かぐや様は許したい（氷）)	Takayuki Kikuchi	Yasuhiro Nakanishi	April 1, 2023
40	3	"Kaguya Wants to Eat It (Ice)"; Transliteration: "Kaguya-sama wa Itadakitai（Kōri）" (Japanese: かぐや様はいただきたい（氷）)	Shoutarou Kitamura	Yasuhiro Nakanishi	April 3, 2023
40	3	"Our Persona"; Transliteration: "Watashitachi no Kamen" (Japanese: 私達の仮面)	Shoutarou Kitamura	Yasuhiro Nakanishi	April 3, 2023
40	3	"Kaguya Wants to Confess (Ice)"; Transliteration: "Kaguya-sama wa Tsugeritai（Kōri）" (Japanese: かぐや様は告りたい（氷）)	Shoutarou Kitamura	Yasuhiro Nakanishi	April 3, 2023
41	4	"Kaguya is Fine With It"; Transliteration: "Kaguya-sama wa Kore De ī" (Japanese: かぐや様はこれでいい)	Tsuyoshi Tobita	Yasuhiro Nakanishi	April 3, 2023

=== Kaguya-sama: Love Is War – The Stairway to Adulthood (2025) ===
Story	Episode	Title	Directed by	Written by	Original release date
42	1	"Chika Fujiwara Wants to Surprise"; Transliteration: "Fujiwara Chika wa Odoroka Setai" (Japanese: 藤原千花は驚かせたい)	Unknown	Unknown	December 31, 2025
42	1	"Miyuki Shirogane Wants to Talk"; Transliteration: "Shirogane Miyuki wa Hanashitai" (Japanese: 白銀御行は話したい)	Unknown	Unknown	December 31, 2025
42	1	"Kaguya Shinomiya's Impossible Task"; Transliteration: "Shinomiya Kaguya no Muri Nandai" (Japanese: 四宮かぐやの無理難題)	Unknown	Unknown	December 31, 2025
Years after graduating from high school, Kaguya reminisces about her first few months dating Miyuki. A week following Kaguya's birthday, Chika decided to pull a prank on Kaguya. She eventually landed on pretending to be Miyuki's new girlfriend. However, Kaguya saw through the prank and pulled one of her own. On their first phone call, Kaguya and Miyuki talked for most of the night, only ending when Kaguya fell asleep. Miyuki discovered that Kei and their father had overheard the conversation, and Miyuki was forced to stay up even longer as they probed his relationship with Kaguya. Meanwhile, Kaguya became flustered after Miyuki began calling her by her first name. To the surprise of his children, Miyuki's father eventually became a successful streamer on YouTube, and Kei's appearances on his stream led to increased donations. The income eventually allowed the family to move into a larger condo.
43	2	"The ABCs of Men and Women"; Transliteration: "Otome no ABC" (Japanese: 男と女のABC)	Unknown	Unknown	December 31, 2025
43	2	"Kaguya Wants to Talk"; Transliteration: "Kaguya-sama wa Hanashitai" (Japanese: かぐや様は話したい)	Unknown	Unknown	December 31, 2025
43	2	"Kaguya Wants to See Them Off"; Transliteration: "Kaguya-sama wa Miokuritai" (Japanese: かぐや様は見送りたい)	Unknown	Unknown	December 31, 2025
As they were walking home together, Kaguya revealed that Ai had left her position at the Shinomiya household and was replaced by a new attendant that she suspected was working for her brother. Miyuki invited her over to his new condo. With his father away at a party with other streamers and Kei at Chika's house playing Among Us, the two spent the entire night alone with each other. Miyuki reassures that their relationship would continue even during his time abroad, and they have sex. Kaguya later talked to Ai about her experience and planned to finally reveal her and Miyuki's relationship to everyone. Months later, Miyuki is sent off by his friends sans Kaguya, who accidentally overslept and missed his flight. She took a flight of her own and sent Miyuki off at the San Francisco International Airport. Though she contemplated flying out to San Francisco every weekend, she eventually settled on a video call, allowing her, the Student Council, and Miyuki to remain connected. Returning to the present, Kaguya greets Miyuki as he returns home from work, and gives him their past albums to use for a project headed by Kozue Makihara, the former head of Shuchiin's Tabletop Gaming Club.
