= Kaguya-sama: Love Is War (TV series) =

Japanese anime television series

- かぐや様は告らせたい ～天才たちの恋愛頭脳戦～ Kaguya-sama wa Kokurasetai – Tensai-tachi no Ren'ai Zunōsen
- Genre: Psychological; Romantic comedy; Slice of life
- Based on: Kaguya-sama: Love Is War
- Created by: Aka Akasaka
- Directed by: Mamoru Hatakeyama
- Series composition: Yasuhiro Nakanishi
- Screenplay by: Yasuhiro Nakanishi; Yukie Sugawara
- Character designer: Yuuko Yahiro
- Music by: Kei Haneoka
- Voices of: Aoi Koga; Konomi Kohara; Makoto Furukawa; Ryōta Suzuki; Momo Asakura; Sayumi Suzushiro; Taku Yashiro; Yumiri Hanamori
- Narrated by: Yutaka Aoyama
- Opening themes: "Love Dramatic" by Masayuki Suzuki ft. Rikka Ihara (S1); "Daddy! Daddy! Do!" by Masayuki Suzuki feat. Airi Suzuki (S2); "GIRI GIRI" by Masayuki Suzuki feat. Sumire Yoshida (Note: Credited as Suu) (S3)
- Ending themes: "Sentimental Crisis" by halca (S1); "Chikatto Chika Chikaa" by Konami Kohara (S1EP3); "Kaze ni Fukarete" by Haruka Fukuhara (S2); "Heart wa Oteage" by Airi Suzuki (S3); "My Nonfiction" by Makoto Furukawa and Konomi Kohara (S3EP5)
- No. of seasons: 3
- No. of episodes: 37 (115 segments) + 2 OVAs + Special (list of episodes)

Production
- Art director: Risa Wakabayashi
- Sound director: Jin Aketagawa
- Cinematographers: Masaharu Okazaki (S1–S3); Kimiya Nobukawa (SP)
- Color designer: Kanako Hokari
- CG director: Yuki Kuribayashi (S2–SP)
- Editor: Rie Matsubara
- Animation producers: Kenshirou Yamada (S1–S3); Yuuichirou Kikuchi (S2–Special)
- Studio: A-1 Pictures
- Producers: Tatsuya Ishikawa; Taku Funakoshi; Toshihiro Maeda; Naoto Nakajima (S1); Tatsurou Hayashi (S2, SP); Genki Negishi (S3)
- Production companies: Aniplex; East Japan Marketing & Communications, Inc.; Quaras; Mainichi Broadcasting System; Shueisha
- Runtime: 24 minutes

Original release
- Networks: MBS, Tokyo MX, GTV, GYT, BS11, CTV, TeNY
- Release: 12 January 2019 – 31 December 2025

Related
- Kaguya-sama: Love Is War – The First Kiss That Never Ends

Kaguya-sama: Love Is War (Japanese: かぐや様は告らせたい ～天才たちの恋愛頭脳戦～, Hepburn: Kaguya-sama wa Kokurasetai: Tensai-tachi no Ren'ai Zunōsen; lit. "Lady Kaguya Wants to Make Him Confess: The Geniuses' War of Hearts and Minds") is a Japanese anime television series produced by A-1 Pictures, based on the manga series Kaguya-sama: Love Is War by Aka Akasaka. The series aired from 12 January 2019 to 25 June 2022 on MBS, Tokyo MX, BS11, GTV, GYT, CTV, and TeNY.

A film, Kaguya-sama: Love Is War – The First Kiss That Never Ends, set after the events of the third season, was released in 2022. A film, serving as the story's conclusion, Kaguya-sama: Love Is War – The Final Chapter, has been announced.

== Series overview ==
Series	Episodes	Originally released	
Series	Episodes	First released	Last released
1	12	12 January 2019	30 March 2019
2	12	11 April 2020	27 June 2020
3	13	9 April 2022	25 June 2022
Film		December 17, 2022	
Special		December 31, 2025	
Film		TBA	

== Cast and characters ==
- Aoi Koga (Japanese) / Alexis Tipton (English) as Kaguya Shinomiya
- Makoto Furukawa (Japanese) / Aaron Dismuke, Clifford Chapin (season 3) (English) as Miyuki Shirogane
- Konomi Kohara (Japanese) / Jad Saxton (English) as Chika Fujiwara
- Ryōta Suzuki (Japanese) / Austin Tindle (English) as Yu Ishigami
- Yumiri Hanamori (Japanese) / AmaLee (English) as Ai Hayasaka
- Miyu Tomita (Japanese) / Madeleine Morris (English) as Miko Iino
- Yutaka Aoyama (Japanese) / Ian Sinclair (English) as the narrator

== Release ==
=== Season 1 ===
The anime television series adaptation was announced by Shueisha on 1 June 2018. Produced by A-1 Pictures, the first season of Kaguya-sama: Love Is War was broadcast from 12 January 2019 to 30 March 2019 on MBS, Tokyo MX, BS11, GTV, GYT, CTV, and TeNY in Japan. The series was directed by Shinichi Omata under the pseudonym Mamoru Hatakeyama and written by Yasuhiro Nakanishi, with animation by A-1 Pictures. Yuuko Yahiro provided the character designs, while Jin Aketagawa served the sound director and Kei Haneoka composed the series' music.

=== Season 2 ===
A second season, titled Kaguya-sama: Love Is War?, was announced on 19 October 2019. The staff and cast returned to reprise their roles, and it aired from 11 April to 27 June 2020. The season received its world premiere prior to Japanese broadcast at Anime Festival Sydney on 8 March 2020.

=== Season 3 ===
On 25 October 2020, an original video animation and a third season were announced for production during the "Kaguya-sama Wants To Tell You On Stage" special event. The OVA was bundled with the manga's twenty-second volume, which was released on 19 May 2021. The third season titled Kaguya-sama: Love Is War – Ultra Romantic aired from 9 April to 25 June 2022, with returning staff and cast members.

=== Television special ===
An anime television special, Kaguya-sama: Love Is War – The Stairway to Adulthood, was announced in June 2025. The anime special premiered on 31 December of the same year, with the staff and cast reprised their roles. The opening theme song is "Abunai Kioku" (アブナイキオク; lit. 'Dangerous Memory') by Masayuki Suzuki featuring Aoi Koga.

=== Films ===
Following the conclusion of the third season, a new anime project was announced to be in production. It was later revealed that the new project is an anime film titled Kaguya-sama: Love Is War – The First Kiss That Never Ends. The main cast from the television series reprised their roles. The film was released on 17 December 2022.

After the airing of The Stairway to Adulthood television special, an anime film featuring the original story by Aka Akasaka and serving as the story's conclusion, Kaguya-sama: Love Is War – The Final Chapter, was announced.

=== International release ===
The English-language logo used for its overseas releases that is issued by Aniplex of America.

The series is licensed by Aniplex's U.S. subsidiary in North America, and streamed the series on Crunchyroll, Hulu, and FunimationNow. In Australia and New Zealand, AnimeLab simulcasted the series within the region. The series is licensed by Muse Communication and was streamed on Netflix, bilibili, iQIYI in Southeast Asia. Funimation acquired exclusive streaming rights for the season in late March; the company began airing an English dub, produced by Studio Nano in Plano, Texas, for the second season on July 25, with the first season dub streaming on 9 March 2021.

== Reception ==
=== Awards and nominations ===
Year	Award	Category	Recipient	Result	Ref.
2019	IGN Awards	Best Anime Series	Kaguya-sama: Love Is War	Nominated	
2020	D-Anime Store Awards	Heart-Pounding Anime	Kaguya-sama: Love Is War	Won	
2020	4th Crunchyroll Anime Awards	Best Girl	Chika Fujiwara	Nominated	
2020	4th Crunchyroll Anime Awards	Best Comedy	Kaguya-sama: Love Is War	Won	
2020	4th Crunchyroll Anime Awards	Best Ending Sequence	"Chikatto Chika Chikaa♡" by Konomi Kohara	Won	
2020	4th Crunchyroll Anime Awards	Best Character Design	Yuko Yahiro, original design by Aka Akasaka	Nominated	
2020	4th Crunchyroll Anime Awards	Best Couple	Kaguya Shinomiya & Miyuki Shirogane	Won	
2020	14th Seiyu Awards	Best Actress in a Leading Role	Aoi Koga as Kaguya Shinomiya	Won	
2020	14th Seiyu Awards	Best Actor in Supporting Role	Makoto Furukawa as Miyuki Shirogane	Won	
2020	10th Newtype Anime Awards	Best TV Anime	Kaguya-sama: Love Is War?	Won	
2020	10th Newtype Anime Awards	Best Male Character	Miyuki Shirogane	Won	
2020	10th Newtype Anime Awards	Best Female Character	Kaguya Shinomiya	Won	
2020	10th Newtype Anime Awards	Best Voice Actor	Makoto Furukawa	Won	
2020	10th Newtype Anime Awards	Best Voice Actress	Aoi Koga	Won	
2020	10th Newtype Anime Awards	Best Theme Song	Daddy! Daddy! Do! feat. Airi Suzuki by Masayuki Suzuki	Won	
2020	10th Newtype Anime Awards	Best Director	Mamoru Hatakeyama	Won	
2020	10th Newtype Anime Awards	Best Screenplay	Yasuhiro Nakanishi	Won	
2020	10th Newtype Anime Awards	Best Character Design	Yuko Yahiro, original design by Aka Akasaka	Won	
2020	Reiwa Anisong Awards	Best Anime Song Award	"Daddy! Daddy! Do! feat. Airi Suzuki" by Masayuki Suzuki	Won	
2021	5th Crunchyroll Anime Awards	Best Girl	Kaguya Shinomiya	Won	
2021	5th Crunchyroll Anime Awards	Best Director	Mamoru Hatakeyama	Nominated	
2021	5th Crunchyroll Anime Awards	Best Comedy	Kaguya-sama: Love Is War?	Won	
2021	5th Crunchyroll Anime Awards	Best Opening Sequence	"Daddy! Daddy! Do! feat. Airi Suzuki" by Masayuki Suzuki	Nominated	
2021	5th Crunchyroll Anime Awards	Best Couple	Kaguya Shinomiya & Miyuki Shirogane	Nominated	
2022	6th Crunchyroll Anime Awards	Best VA Performance (Spanish)	Jessica Ángeles as Kaguya Shinomiya	Nominated	
2022	12th Newtype Anime Awards	Best Work (TV)	Kaguya-sama: Love Is War – Ultra Romantic	4th place	
2022	12th Newtype Anime Awards	Best Male Character	Miyuki Shirogane	2nd place	
2022	12th Newtype Anime Awards	Best Male Character	Yu Ishigami	10th place	
2022	12th Newtype Anime Awards	Best Female Character	Kaguya Shinomiya	2nd place	
2022	12th Newtype Anime Awards	Best Voice Actor	Makoto Furukawa	2nd place	
2022	12th Newtype Anime Awards	Best Voice Actress	Aoi Koga	Won	
2022	12th Newtype Anime Awards	Best Theme Song	"GIRI GIRI" by Masayuki Suzuki feat. Suu	2nd place	
2022	12th Newtype Anime Awards	Best Director	Mamoru Hatakeyama	3rd place	
2022	12th Newtype Anime Awards	Best Screenplay	Yasuhiro Nakanishi	Won	
2022	12th Newtype Anime Awards	Best Character Design	Yuko Yahiro, original design by Aka Akasaka	3rd place	
2022	12th Newtype Anime Awards	Best Mascot Character	Chika Fujiwara	3rd place	
2022	12th Newtype Anime Awards	Best Soundtrack	Kei Haneoka	4th place	
2023	7th Crunchyroll Anime Awards	Best Supporting Character	Ai Hayasaka	Nominated	
2023	7th Crunchyroll Anime Awards	Best Continuing Series	Kaguya-sama: Love Is War – Ultra Romantic	Nominated	
2023	7th Crunchyroll Anime Awards	Best Comedy	Kaguya-sama: Love Is War – Ultra Romantic	Nominated	
2023	7th Crunchyroll Anime Awards	Best Romance	Kaguya-sama: Love Is War – Ultra Romantic	Won	
2023	7th Crunchyroll Anime Awards	Best Anime Song	"My Nonfiction" by Makoto Furukawa and Konomi Kohara	Nominated	
2023	7th Crunchyroll Anime Awards	Best Ending Sequence	"My Heart Has Surrendered" by Airi Suzuki	Nominated	
2023	7th Crunchyroll Anime Awards	Best VA Performance (French)	Martin Faliu as Miyuki Shirogane	Nominated	
2023	7th Crunchyroll Anime Awards	Best VA Performance (Spanish)	Elizabeth Infante as Chika Fujiwara	Nominated	
2023	Japan Expo Awards	Daruma for Best Anime	Kaguya-sama: Love Is War – Ultra Romantic	Nominated	
2023	Japan Expo Awards	Daruma for Best Director	Kaguya-sama: Love Is War – Ultra Romantic	Nominated	
2023	Japan Expo Awards	Daruma for Best Romance Anime	Kaguya-sama: Love Is War – Ultra Romantic	Won	
2023	Japan Expo Awards	Daruma for Best Opening	"GIRI GIRI" by Masayuki Suzuki	Nominated	
2023	Japan Expo Awards	Daruma for Best Ending	"My Heart Has Surrendered" by Airi Suzuki	Nominated	
