= Crunchyroll Anime Award for Best Comedy =

- Awarded for: Best comedy anime series of the previous year
- Country: United States; Japan
- First award: Studio Deen – Haven't You Heard? I'm Sakamoto (2017)
- Currently held by: Science SARU – Dandadan Season 2 (2026)

Highlights
- Most wins: Studio: A-1 Pictures (3); Anime: Kaguya-sama: Love Is War / Spy × Family (2)
- Most nominations: Studio: CloverWorks (7); Anime: Spy × Family (4)
- Website: Crunchyroll Anime Awards

The Crunchyroll Anime Award for Best Comedy is a genre-specific award given at the Crunchyroll Anime Awards since its inaugural edition in 2017. It is given for the best comedy anime series from the previous year. Winners are determined through a combined voting process by judges and public voting.

Haven't You Heard? I'm Sakamoto by Studio Deen first won the award in 2017. In the latest edition in 2026, the second season of Dandadan by Science SARU won the award.

== Winners and nominees ==
In the following list, the first titles listed in gold are the winners; those not in gold are nominees, which are listed in alphabetical order. The years given are those in which the ceremonies took place.

=== 2010s ===
Year	Anime	Studio(s)
2016 (1st)
2016 (1st)	Haven't You Heard? I'm Sakamoto	Studio Deen
2016 (1st)	Keijo	Xebec
2016 (1st)	KonoSuba: God's Blessing on This Wonderful World!	Studio Deen
2016 (1st)	Space Patrol Luluco	Studio Trigger
2016 (1st)	Most Popular "Other": Nanbaka	Satelight
2017 (2nd)
2017 (2nd)	Miss Kobayashi's Dragon Maid	Kyoto Animation
2017 (2nd)	Gamers!	Pine Jam
2017 (2nd)	KonoSuba: God's Blessing on This Wonderful World! (season 2)	Studio Deen
2017 (2nd)	Little Witch Academia	Studio Trigger
2017 (2nd)	Mr. Osomatsu (season 2)	Pierrot
2017 (2nd)	Tsuredure Children	Studio Gokumi
2019 (4th)
2019 (4th)	Kaguya-sama: Love Is War	A-1 Pictures
2019 (4th)	Aggretsuko (season 2)	Fanworks
2019 (4th)	How Heavy Are the Dumbbells You Lift?	Doga Kobo
2019 (4th)	Isekai Quartet	Studio Puyukai
2019 (4th)	My Roommate Is a Cat	Zero-G
2019 (4th)	Sarazanmai	MAPPA / Lapin Track

=== 2020s ===
Year	Anime	Studio(s)
2020 (5th)
2020 (5th)	Kaguya-sama: Love Is War? (season 2)	A-1 Pictures
2020 (5th)	Kakushigoto: My Dad's Secret Ambition	Ajiado
2020 (5th)	Keep Your Hands Off Eizouken!	Science SARU
2020 (5th)	The Misfit of Demon King Academy	Silver Link
2020 (5th)	My Next Life as a Villainess: All Routes Lead to Doom!	Silver Link
2020 (5th)	Sleepy Princess in the Demon Castle	Doga Kobo
2021 (6th)
2021 (6th)	Komi Can't Communicate	OLM
2021 (6th)	Don't Toy with Me, Miss Nagatoro	Telecom Animation Film
2021 (6th)	Heaven's Design Team	Asahi Production
2021 (6th)	Life Lessons with Uramichi Oniisan	Studio Blanc
2021 (6th)	Miss Kobayashi's Dragon Maid S (season 2)	Kyoto Animation
2021 (6th)	Odd Taxi	OLM and P.I.C.S.
2021/2022 (7th)
2021/2022 (7th)	Spy × Family	Wit Studio and CloverWorks
2021/2022 (7th)	Kaguya-sama: Love Is War – Ultra Romantic (season 3)	A-1 Pictures
2021/2022 (7th)	Kotaro Lives Alone	Liden Films
2021/2022 (7th)	My Dress-Up Darling	CloverWorks
2021/2022 (7th)	Uncle from Another World	Atelier Pontdarc
2021/2022 (7th)	Ya Boy Kongming!	P.A. Works
2022/2023 (8th)
2022/2023 (8th)	Spy × Family (season 1 cour 2)	Wit Studio and CloverWorks
2022/2023 (8th)	Bocchi the Rock!	CloverWorks
2022/2023 (8th)	Buddy Daddies	P.A. Works
2022/2023 (8th)	Mashle: Magic and Muscles	A-1 Pictures
2022/2023 (8th)	Urusei Yatsura	David Production
2022/2023 (8th)	Zom 100: Bucket List of the Dead	Bug Films
2023/2024 (9th)
2023/2024 (9th)	Mashle: Magic and Muscles The Divine Visionary Candidate Exam Arc (season 2)	A-1 Pictures
2023/2024 (9th)	Delicious in Dungeon	Studio Trigger
2023/2024 (9th)	KonoSuba: God's Blessing on This Wonderful World! (season 3)	Drive
2023/2024 (9th)	My Deer Friend Nokotan	Wit Studio
2023/2024 (9th)	Ranma ½	MAPPA
2023/2024 (9th)	Spy × Family (season 2)	Wit Studio and CloverWorks
2025 (10th)
2025 (10th)	Dandadan (season 2)	Science SARU
2025 (10th)	City the Animation	Kyoto Animation
2025 (10th)	My Dress-Up Darling (season 2)	CloverWorks
2025 (10th)	Ranma ½ (season 2)	MAPPA
2025 (10th)	Spy × Family (season 3)	Wit Studio and CloverWorks
2025 (10th)	Witch Watch	Bibury Animation Studios

== Records ==
=== Anime series ===
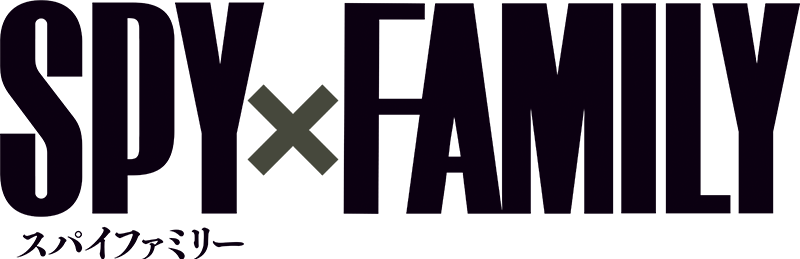

Spy × Family holds the record for the most nominations in an anime series, as well as having the most wins along with Kaguya-sama: Love Is War.

KonoSuba: God's Blessing on This Wonderful World! holds the record for the most nominations without a win in an anime series.

Franchise	Wins	Nominations	Seasons
Spy × Family	2	4	Season 1 cour 1, Season 1 cour 2, Season 2, Season 3
Kaguya-sama: Love Is War	2	3	Season 1, Love Is War?, Ultra Romantic
Mashle: Magic and Muscles	1	2	Season 1, The Divine Visionary Candidate Exam Arc
Miss Kobayashi's Dragon Maid	1	2	Season 1, S
KonoSuba: God's Blessing on This Wonderful World!	0	3	Season 1, Season 2, Season 3
My Dress-Up Darling	0	2	Season 1, Season 2
Ranma ½	0	2	Season 1, Season 2

=== Studios ===
A-1 Pictures holds the record for the most wins in an anime studio.

CloverWorks holds the record for the most nominations in an anime studio.

MAPPA and Studio Trigger holds the record for the most nominations without a win in an anime studio.

A-1 Pictures received the most wins with 3, followed by CloverWorks and Wit Studio with 2. CloverWorks has the most nominations with 7. Spy × Family received the most nominations (4) in an anime series, as well as tying the most wins (2) with Kaguya-sama: Love Is War. The remaining studios (Kyoto Animation, OLM and Studio Deen) received 1 was single-cour anime series.

MAPPA and Studio Trigger received the most nominations for an anime studio without a single win with 3. KonoSuba: God's Blessing on This Wonderful World! received three nominations, but also did not win a single award.

Studio	Wins	Nominations	Seasons
A-1 Pictures	3	5	Kaguya-sama: Love Is War (Season 1, Love Is War?, Ultra Romantic), Mashle: Magic and Muscles (Season 1, The Divine Visionary Candidate Exam Arc)
CloverWorks	2	7	Bocchi the Rock!, My Dress-Up Darling (Season 1, Season 2), Spy × Family (Season 1 cour 1, Season 1 cour 2, Season 2, Season 3)
Wit Studio	2	5	My Deer Friend Nokotan, Spy × Family (Season 1 cour 1, Season 1 cour 2, Season 2, Season 3)
Kyoto Animation	1	3	Miss Kobayashi's Dragon Maid (Season 1, S), City the Animation
Studio Deen	1	3	Haven't You Heard? I'm Sakamoto, KonoSuba: God's Blessing on This Wonderful World! (Season 1, Season 2)
OLM	1	2	Komi Can't Communicate, Odd Taxi
Science SARU	1	2	Dandadan (Season 2), Keep Your Hands Off Eizouken!
MAPPA	0	3	Ranma ½ (Season 1, Season 2), Sarazanmai
Studio Trigger	0	3	Delicious in Dungeon, Little Witch Academia, Space Patrol Luluco
Doga Kobo	0	2	How Heavy Are the Dumbbells You Lift?, Sleepy Princess in the Demon Castle
P.A. Works	0	2	Buddy Daddies, Ya Boy Kongming!
Silver Link	0	2	The Misfit of Demon King Academy, My Next Life as a Villainess: All Routes Lead to Doom!
