= 5th Crunchyroll Anime Awards =

2021 award ceremony

- Awarded for: Excellence in anime
- Date: February 19, 2021
- Country: United States
- Presented by: Crunchyroll
- Hosted by: Tim Lyu; Crunchyroll-Hime

Highlights
- Most wins: Jujutsu Kaisen (3)
- Most nominations: Great Pretender, Jujutsu Kaisen, and Keep Your Hands Off Eizouken! (10)
- Anime of the Year: Jujutsu Kaisen

The 5th Crunchyroll Anime Awards were held on February 19, 2021, honoring excellence in anime from 2020. Crunchyroll announced the list of categories as well as the judges on December 16, 2020. They noted that the categories used in the previous edition were to be used in this edition as well. They also noted that the number of judges increased. Nominees were announced on January 15, the first day of voting. It ran until January 22. There were 15 million votes cast, with a majority coming from the United States, Mexico, and Brazil. The awards ceremony was streamed live on February 19 as a digital event. It was virtually hosted by Tim Lyu with Crunchyroll-Hime, the official mascot of Crunchyroll. Due to the COVID-19 pandemic, Crunchyroll noted that the show "will look different."

Great Pretender, Jujutsu Kaisen, and Keep Your Hands Off Eizouken! each received ten nominations, followed by Beastars with eight and Tower of God at seven. Among the nominated were Mamoru Miyano, who received his third nomination in the awards, this time for Best Ending Sequence. Voice actor Yuichi Nakamura received his second nomination in the Best VA Performance (JP) category. Yutaka Yamada was nominated in two categories, Best Score and Best Opening Sequence. Jujutsu Kaisen's opening and ending theme were both nominated in their respective categories. Japanese band ALI received two nominations, one in Best Opening Sequence and one in Best Ending Sequence. Directors Masaaki Yuasa and Yuzuru Tachikawa each received their second nomination in Best Director. Fruits Basket was again nominated for a second time in the Best Drama category. Kaguya-sama: Love is War? received its second nomination in Best Comedy. Two fight scenes from The God of High School were nominated for the Best Fight Scene award. Kaguya Shinomiya and Miyuki Shirogane, winners in the previous edition, was nominated again for Best Couple. Kevin Penkin received his third straight nomination for Best Score.

Jujutsu Kaisen won the Anime of the Year award. Kaguya-sama: Love is War? won Best Comedy for the second time. Masaaki Yuasa won his second Best Director as well; the anime that he directed, Keep Your Hands Off Eizouken!, won Best Animation. Kevin Penkin received his second win for Best Score. ALI both won Best Opening Sequence and Best Ending Sequence for "Wild Side" and "Lost in Paradise" respectively. Re:Zero − Starting Life in Another World won Best Fantasy, while Fruits Basket won Best Drama.

== Winners and nominees ==
Winners are listed first, highlighted in boldface, and indicated with a double dagger (‡). The lists are arranged alphabetically, except for the winner.

| **Anime of the Year**: **Jujutsu Kaisen** — **MAPPA**‡; Appare-Ranman! — P.A. Works; Beastars — Orange; Dorohedoro — MAPPA; Great Pretender — Wit Studio; Keep Your Hands Off Eizouken! — Science SARU | **Best Protagonist**: **Catarina Claes** — **My Next Life as a Villainess: All Routes Lead to Doom!**‡; Anos Voldigoad — The Misfit of Demon King Academy; Midori Asakusa — Keep Your Hands Off Eizouken!; Natsume — Deca-Dence; Shoyo Hinata — Haikyu!! To the Top (season 4); Yuji Itadori — Jujutsu Kaisen |
| **Best Antagonist**: **Ryomen Sukuna** — **Jujutsu Kaisen**‡; Akito Soma — Fruits Basket (season 2); Echidna — Re:Zero − Starting Life in Another World (season 2); En — Dorohedoro; Overhaul — My Hero Academia (season 4); Rachel — Tower of God | **Best Boy**: **Shoyo Hinata — Haikyu!! To the Top (season 4)**‡; Anos Voldigoad — The Misfit of Demon King Academy; Caiman — Dorohedoro; Khun Aguero Agnes — Tower of God; Legoshi — Beastars; Satoru Gojo — Jujutsu Kaisen |
| **Best Girl**: **Kaguya Shinomiya — Kaguya-sama: Love Is War?** **(season 2)**‡; Abigail Jones — Great Pretender; Catarina Claes — My Next Life as a Villainess: All Routes Lead to Doom!; Chizuru Mizuhara — Rent-A-Girlfriend; Noi — Dorohedoro; Sayaka Kanamori — Keep Your Hands Off Eizouken! | **Best Opening Sequence**: **"Wild Side" by ALI — Beastars**‡; "DADDY! DADDY! DO! feat. Airi Suzuki" by Masayuki Suzuki — Kaguya-sama: Love Is War? (season 2); "Easy Breezy" by chelmico — Keep Your Hands Off Eizouken!; "G.P." composed by Yutaka Yamada — Great Pretender; "Kaikai Kitan" by Eve — Jujutsu Kaisen; "Phoenix" by Burnout Syndromes — Haikyu!! To the Top (season 4) |
| **Best Ending Sequence**: **"Lost in Paradise" by ALI feat. AKLO — Jujutsu Kaisen**‡; "D.D.D.D" by (K)NoW_NAME) — Dorohedoro; "Last Dance" by Mamoru Miyano — In/Spectre; "NIGHT RUNNING" by Shin Sakura ft. AAAMY — BNA: Brand New Animal; "The Great Pretender" by Freddie Mercury — Great Pretender; "Welcome My Friend" by OKAMOTO'S — The Millionaire Detective Balance: Unlimited | **Best VA Performance (JP)**: **Yūsuke Kobayashi as Subaru Natsuki — Re:Zero − Starting Life in Another World (season 2)**‡; Megumi Ogata as Hanako — Toilet-Bound Hanako-kun; Mutsumi Tamura as Sayaka Kanamori — Keep Your Hands Off Eizouken!; Riho Sugiyama as Minare Koda — Wave, Listen to Me!; Yuichi Nakamura as Satoru Gojo — Jujutsu Kaisen; Yūsuke Ōnuki as Daisuke Kambe — The Millionaire Detective Balance: Unlimited |
| **Best VA Performance (EN)**: **Zeno Robinson as Hawks — My Hero Academia (season 4)**‡; Aaron Phillips as Laurent Thierry — Great Pretender; Anairis Quiñones as Echidna — Re:Zero − Starting Life in Another World (season 2); Crispin Freeman as Ziusudra — Fate/Grand Order - Absolute Demonic Front: Babylonia; Johnny Yong Bosch as Bam — Tower of God; Jonah Scott as Legoshi — Beastars | **Best Director**: **Masaaki Yuasa — Keep Your Hands Off Eizouken!**‡; Hiro Kaburagi — Great Pretender; Mamoru Hatakeyama — Kaguya-sama: Love is War? (season 2); Sunghoo Park — Jujutsu Kaisen; Takashi Sano — Tower of God; Yuzuru Tachikawa — Deca-Dence |
| **Best Animation**: **Keep Your Hands Off Eizouken! — Science SARU**‡; Beastars — Orange; Great Pretender — Wit Studio; Jujutsu Kaisen — MAPPA; Princess Connect! Re:Dive — CygamesPictures; The God of High School — MAPPA | **Best Character Design**: **Mayuka Itou, original designs by Iro Aida — Toilet-Bound Hanako-kun**‡; Genice Chan and Yuusuke Yoshigaki — BNA: Brand New Animal; Masashi Kudoh and Miho Tanino, original designs by SIU — Tower of God; Naoyuki Asano, original designs by Sumito Oowara — Keep Your Hands Off Eizouken!; Rumiko Takahashi and Yoshihito Hishinuma — Yashahime: Princess Half-Demon; Yoshiyuki Sadamoto and Hirotaka Katō — Great Pretender |
| **Best Fight Scene**: **Deku vs. Overhaul — My Hero Academia (season 4)**‡; Bercouli vs. Dark God Vecta — Sword Art Online: Alicization: War of the Underworld Part 2; Brawler vs. Master — Akudama Drive; Jin Mori vs. Han Daewi — The God of High School; Jin Mori vs. Jegal Taek — The God of High School; Satoru Gojo vs. Ryomen Sukuna — Jujutsu Kaisen | **Best Drama**: **Fruits Basket (season 2) — TMS Entertainment**‡; Beastars — Orange; Great Pretender — Wit Studio; Japan Sinks: 2020 — Science SARU; Sing "Yesterday" for Me — Doga Kobo; Somali and the Forest Spirit — Satelight & HORNETS |
| **Best Comedy**: **Kaguya-sama: Love Is War? (season 2) — A-1 Pictures**‡; Kakushigoto: My Dad's Secret Ambition — Ajiado; Keep Your Hands Off Eizouken! — Science SARU; My Next Life as a Villainess: All Routes Lead to Doom! — Silver Link; Sleepy Princess in the Demon Castle — Doga Kobo; The Misfit of Demon King Academy — Silver Link | **Best Score**: **Kevin Penkin — Tower of God**‡; Alisa Okehazama — The God of High School; Kensuke Ushio — Japan Sinks: 2020; Oorutaichi — Keep Your Hands Off Eizouken!; Satoru Kōsaki — Beastars; Yutaka Yamada — Great Pretender |
| **Best Couple**: **Nasa Yuzaki & Tsukasa Yuzaki — TONIKAWA: Over The Moon For You**‡; Catarina Claes & Maria Campbell — My Next Life as a Villainess: All Routes Lead to Doom!; Chizuru Mizuhara & Kazuya Kinoshita — Rent-A-Girlfriend; Kaguya Shinomiya & Miyuki Shirogane — Kaguya-sama: Love is War? (season 2); Kotoko Iwanaga & Kuro Sakuragawa — In/Spectre; Legoshi & Haru — Beastars | **Best Fantasy**: **Re:Zero − Starting Life in Another World (season 2) — White Fox**‡; Ascendance of a Bookworm (season 2) — Ajiado; Deca-Dence — NUT; Dorohedoro — MAPPA; Dragon Quest: The Adventure of Dai — Toei Animation; Tower of God — Telecom Animation Film |

== Statistics ==
Anime with multiple nominations
| Nominations | Anime |
|---|---|
| 10 | Great Pretender |
| 10 | Jujutsu Kaisen |
| 10 | Keep Your Hands Off Eizouken! |
| 8 | Beastars |
| 7 | Tower of God |
| 6 | Dorohedoro |
| 5 | Kaguya-sama: Love Is War? (season 2) |
| 4 | The God of High School |
| 4 | My Next Life as a Villainess: All Routes Lead to Doom! |
| 4 | Re:Zero − Starting Life in Another World (season 2) |
| 3 | Deca-Dence |
| 3 | Haikyu!! To the Top (season 4) |
| 3 | The Misfit of Demon King Academy |
| 3 | My Hero Academia (season 4) |
| 2 | BNA: Brand New Animal |
| 2 | Fruits Basket (season 2) |
| 2 | In/Spectre |
| 2 | Japan Sinks: 2020 |
| 2 | Rent-A-Girlfriend |
| 2 | The Millionaire Detective - Balance: UNLIMITED |

Anime with multiple wins
| Wins | Anime |
|---|---|
| 3 | Jujutsu Kaisen |
| 2 | Kaguya-sama: Love is War? (season 2) |
| 2 | Keep Your Hands Off Eizouken! |
| 2 | My Hero Academia (season 4) |
| 2 | Re:Zero − Starting Life in Another World (season 2) |
