= Kaguya-sama: Love Is War – The First Kiss That Never Ends =

2022 animated film

- Kanji: かぐや様は告らせたい-ファーストキッスは終わらない-
- Revised Hepburn: Kaguya-sama wa Kokurasetai: First Kiss wa Owaranai
- Directed by: Mamoru Hatakeyama
- Screenplay by: Yasuhiro Nakanishi
- Based on: Kaguya-sama: Love Is War by Aka Akasaka
- Produced by: Tatsuya Ishikawa; Taku Funakoshi; Toshihiro Maeda; Genki Negishi
- Starring: Aoi Koga; Makoto Furukawa; Konomi Kohara; Ryōta Suzuki; Yumiri Hanamori; Miyu Tomita
- Cinematography: Masaharu Okazaki
- Edited by: Rie Matsubara
- Music by: Kei Haneoka
- Production company: A-1 Pictures
- Distributed by: Aniplex
- Release date: 17 December 2022 (Japan)
- Running time: 100 minutes
- Country: Japan
- Language: Japanese

Kaguya-sama: Love Is War – The First Kiss That Never Ends (Japanese: かぐや様は告らせたい-ファーストキッスは終わらない-, Hepburn: Kaguya-sama wa Kokurasetai: Fāsuto Kissu wa Owaranai) is a 2022 Japanese animated romantic comedy film based on the manga series of the same name by Aka Akasaka, that was directed by Shinichi Omata, produced by A-1 Pictures, and distributed by Aniplex. It was released in theatres in Japan on 17 December 2022.

It is set after the events of the third season of the Kaguya-sama: Love Is War TV series.

== Plot ==
In the aftermath of the Culture Festival, Kaguya Shinomiya agrees to accompany Miyuki Shirogane to Stanford University in the United States for school, giving him a kiss in the process. Later that night, Kaguya is horrified to learn from her maid, Ai Hayasaka, that she took it one step too far by accidentally giving Shirogane "an adult kiss".

The following day, Shirogane is anxious to discuss his current relationship status with Kaguya, only to find she's been transformed into "Little Kaguya" (a visual representation of her anxious and sleep deprived mind). After Kaguya falls asleep, she has a dream where her differing personality traits argue over what the best course of action shall be. Her uptight personality, "Ice Kaguya", angrily takes control from "Little Kaguya", becoming Kaguya's dominant personality. Meanwhile, the other student council members, Yu Ishigami and Miko Iino, are invited to a Christmas party at the house of Ishigami's crush, Tsubame Koyasu; Chika Fujiwara invites Kaguya and the Shirogane family to her house for Christmas Eve.

"Ice Kaguya" engages in several battles in a distinctly assertive manner in hopes of getting Shirogane to kiss her. This includes trying to get him to hold her hand on a cold walk home, trying to impress him with a perfume, and trying to get him to feed her some of his homemade lunch. Shirogane stresses over understanding what Kaguya wants from him, receiving little advice from Maki Shijo. The stress causes him to stay up late until he passes out from exhaustion. At the hospital, "Ice Kaguya" laments her unlikable behavior and breaks down entirely as she wishes to be cute like "Little Kaguya". The Kaguyas decide if the "True Kaguya" gets a kiss, they can finally accept themselves for who they are. Shirogane laments his insecurities to the doctor about how he feels he can't stand side-by-side with Kaguya unless he appears perfect, stemming from the deep-seated resentment of his mother leaving their family when he was younger, and attempting to take his more academically gifted sister with her. Despite his condition, Shirogane continues to push himself.

Christmas Eve arrives, where "Ice Kaguya", Shirogane, and his sister Kei, attend the party at the Fujiwara's. Shirogane presents a seemingly imperfect gift to "Ice Kaguya", but hesitates to give it to her claiming he can get her something better before running off. "Ice Kaguya" gives chase, eventually opening the gift to find an expensive kendama. She expresses her desire to know the real Shirogane no matter his imperfections. They share a quiet kiss, in contrast to the glamour of their first kiss. "Ice Kaguya" surmises she'll feel just as happy as she was during their first kiss every time they share one: a first kiss that never ends.

"Ice Kaguya" uses a fabric in Shirogane's gift to tie her hair back, reverting back to normal (as the narrator states it all to be a metaphor to represent a young maiden in love). Some days later, Tsubame, after an apparent disastrous party the night before, receives advice from a psychic (Shirogane's father) about why couples fall in love, just as Kaguya and Shirogane agree to start a relationship.

== Voice cast ==
Character	Japanese	English
Kaguya Shinomiya (四宮(しのみや) かぐや)	Aoi Koga	Alexis Tipton
Miyuki Shirogane (白銀(しろがね) 御行(みゆき))	Makoto Furukawa	Aaron Dismuke
Chika Fujiwara (藤原(ふじわら) 千花(ちか))	Konomi Kohara	Jad Saxton
Yu Ishigami (石上(いしがみ) 優(ゆう))	Ryōta Suzuki	Austin Tindle
Ai Hayasaka (早坂(はやさか) 愛(あい))	Yumiri Hanamori	Amanda Lee
Miko Iino (伊井野(いいの) ミコ)	Miyu Tomita	Madeleine Morris
Narrator	Yutaka Aoyama	Ian Sinclair

== Production ==
Following the conclusion of the third season, a new anime project was announced to be in production. It was later revealed that the new project is an anime film titled Kaguya-sama: Love Is War – The First Kiss That Never Ends. The main cast from the television series reprised their roles.

== Music ==
The opening theme song is "Love is Show" by Masayuki Suzuki featuring Reni Takagi and the ending is "Heart Notes" by Airi Suzuki.

== Release ==
=== Theatrical ===
The film premiered in theatres on 17 December 2022, before being released on television. The film premiered in theatres in February 2023 for United States, Canada, Singapore, Australia, New Zealand, and United Kingdom.

=== Home media ===
The film was broadcast in Japan on MBS, split into two halves, on 1 and 3 April 2023, respectively, while Tokyo MX premiered the entire film on 5 April.

== Reception ==
Richard Eisenbeis of Anime News Network gave the film a B− rating overall, and said it "is a solid film and an excellent character piece". Kambole Campbell of Polygon called the film "incredibly romantic", and said that: "The leap to feature length doesn't change much visually from the anime – the production quality here is on a level with the show."

At the 8th Crunchyroll Anime Awards in 2024, Kaguya-sama: Love Is War – The First Kiss That Never Ends was nominated for Best Film.
