= Crunchyroll Anime Award for Best Ending Sequence =

- Awarded for: Best ending sequence of the previous year
- Country: United States; Japan
- First award: "You Only Live Once" by Wataru Hatano – Yuri on Ice (2017)
- Currently held by: "I" by Bump of Chicken – My Hero Academia: Final Season (2026)

Highlights
- Most wins: Anime: Jujutsu Kaisen (2)
- Most nominations: Anime: Attack on Titan (3)
- Website: Crunchyroll Anime Awards

The Crunchyroll Anime Award for Best Ending Sequence, formerly known as Crunchyroll Anime Award for Best Ending, is a music and sequence award given at the Crunchyroll Anime Awards since its inaugural edition in 2017. It is given for the best ending sequence in an anime series from the previous year. Winners are determined through a combined voting process by judges and public voting.

The ending sequence "You Only Live Once" composed by Wataru Hatano in Yuri on Ice first won the award in 2017. In the latest edition in 2026, "I" performed by Bump of Chicken in the eighth and final season of My Hero Academia won the award.

== Winners and nominees ==
In the following list, the first titles listed in gold are the winners; those not in gold are nominees, which are listed in alphabetical order. The year given is the year the ending song premiered.

=== 2010s ===
Best Ending

Year	Sequence	Anime	Recipient(s)
2016 (1st)
2016 (1st)	"You Only Live Once"	Yuri on Ice	Wataru Hatano
2016 (1st)	"ninelie"	Kabaneri of the Iron Fortress	Aimer feat. chelly from Egoist
2016 (1st)	"Pipo Password"	Space Patrol Luluco	TeddyLoid feat. Bonjour Suzuki
2016 (1st)	"Refrain Boy"	Mob Psycho 100	ALL OFF
2016 (1st)	Most Popular "Other": "Styx Helix"	Re:Zero − Starting Life in Another World	Myth & Roid
2017 (2nd)
2017 (2nd)	"Ishukan Communication"	Miss Kobayashi's Dragon Maid	Chorogonzu
2017 (2nd)	"behind"	Just Because!	Karin Isobe, Yuna Yoshino, and Lynn
2017 (2nd)	"Hikari, Hikari"	Recovery of an MMO Junkie	Yuuka Aisaka
2017 (2nd)	"Kafune"	March Comes in Like a Lion	Brian the Sun
2017 (2nd)	"Kirameku Hamabe"	Land of the Lustrous	Yuiko Ōhara
2017 (2nd)	"Step Up LOVE"	Blood Blockade Battlefront & Beyond (season 2)	Daoko x Yasuyuki Okamura

Best Ending Sequence

Year	Sequence	Anime	Recipient(s)
2018 (3rd)
2018 (3rd)	"Akatsuki no Requiem"	Attack on Titan (season 3)	Linked Horizon
2018 (3rd)	"Fly Me to the Star"	Revue Starlight	Starlight Kukugumi
2018 (3rd)	"Kakatte Koi yo"	Megalo Box	NakamuraEmi
2018 (3rd)	"Ref:rain"	After the Rain	Aimer
2018 (3rd)	"Spiky Seeds"	FLCL Progressive (season 2)	The Pillows
2018 (3rd)	"Star Overhead"	FLCL Alternative (season 3)	The Pillows
2019 (4th)
2019 (4th)	"Chikatto Chika Chikaa♡"	Kaguya-sama: Love Is War	Konomi Kohara
2019 (4th)	"Hold Me Now"	Carole & Tuesday	Nai Br.XX & Celeina Ann
2019 (4th)	"Sayonara Gokko"	Dororo	amazarashi
2019 (4th)	"Stand by Me"	Sarazanmai	the peggies
2019 (4th)	"Torches"	Vinland Saga	Aimer
2019 (4th)	"veil"	Fire Force	Keina Suda

=== 2020s ===
Year	Sequence	Anime	Recipient(s)
2020 (5th)
2020 (5th)	"Lost in Paradise"	Jujutsu Kaisen	ALI feat. Aklo
2020 (5th)	"D.D.D.D"	Dorohedoro	(K)NoW_NAME)
2020 (5th)	"The Great Pretender"	Great Pretender	Freddie Mercury (posthumous nomination)
2020 (5th)	"Last Dance"	In/Spectre	Mamoru Miyano
2020 (5th)	"Night Running"	BNA: Brand New Animal	Shin Sakura feat. AAAMY
2020 (5th)	"Welcome My Friend"	The Millionaire Detective Balance: Unlimited	OKAMOTO'S
2021 (6th)
2021 (6th)	"Shirogane"	Demon Slayer: Kimetsu no Yaiba Mugen Train Arc (season 2)	LiSA, storyboard and direction by Tomonori Sudō
2021 (6th)	"Ganbare! Kumoko-san no Theme"	So I'm a Spider, So What?	Aoi Yūki, storyboard and direction by Shin Itagaki
2021 (6th)	"Infinity"	SK8 the Infinity	Yuuri, storyboard by Hiroko Utsumi, direction by Akemi Hayashi
2021 (6th)	"Nai Nai"	Shadows House	Reona, storyboard and direction by Tomohisa Taguchi
2021 (6th)	"Shogeki"	Attack on Titan: The Final Season Part 1 (season 4)	Yuko Ando
2021 (6th)	"Yasashii Suisei"	Beastars (season 2)	Yoasobi
2022 (7th)
2022 (7th)	"Comedy"	Spy × Family	Gen Hoshino, direction and storyboard by Atsushi Nishigori
2022 (7th)	"Akuma no Ko"	Attack on Titan: The Final Season Part 2 (season 4 cour 2)	Ai Higuchi, direction and storyboard by Paraco Shinohara
2022 (7th)	"Heart wa Oteage"	Kaguya-sama: Love Is War – Ultra Romantic (season 3)	Airi Suzuki, direction and storyboard by Nichika Ono
2022 (7th)	"Koi no Yukue"	My Dress-Up Darling	Akari Akase, direction and storyboard by Futata
2022 (7th)	"Koshaberi Biyori"	Komi Can't Communicate (season 2)	Fantastic Youth, direction and storyboard by Kōki Fujimoto
2022 (7th)	"Yofukashi no Uta"	Call of the Night	Creepy Nuts, direction by Haruka Segawa, storyboard by Tomoyuki Itamura
2023 (8th)
2023 (8th)	"Akari"	Jujutsu Kaisen (season 2)	Soushi Sakiyama, storyboard and direction by Yojiro Arai
2023 (8th)	"Color"	Spy × Family (season 1 cour 2)	Yama, storyboard and direction by Takayuki Hirao
2023 (8th)	"Happiness of the Dead"	Zom 100: Bucket List of the Dead	Shiyui, storyboard and direction by Hanako Ueda
2023 (8th)	"Hawatari Nioku Centi"	Chainsaw Man	Maximum the Hormone, storyboard and direction by Yuki Kamiya
2023 (8th)	"Koi Kogare"	Demon Slayer: Kimetsu no Yaiba Swordsmith Village Arc (season 3)	Milet and Man with a Mission, storyboard and direction by Yuki Shimizu
2023 (8th)	"Mephisto"	Oshi no Ko	Queen Bee, storyboard and direction by Naoya Nakayama
2024 (9th)
2024 (9th)	"Request"	Solo Leveling	Krage, storyboard and direction by Hiromu Ōshiro
2024 (9th)	"Anta Nante"	Ranma ½	Riria., storyboard by Minami Kitamura, direction by Minami Kitamura and Fumiyuki Uehara
2024 (9th)	"Burning"	Oshi no Ko (season 2)	Hitsujibungaku, storyboard and direction by Naoya Nakayama
2024 (9th)	"Kamakura Style"	The Elusive Samurai	BotchiBoromaru, storyboard and direction by Yuki Yonemuri
2024 (9th)	"Nobody"	Kaiju No. 8	OneRepublic, storyboard and direction by Toya Ooshima
2024 (9th)	"Taidada"	Dandadan	Zutomayo, storyboard by Moko-chan, direction by Moko-chan and Nick McKergow
2025 (10th)
2025 (10th)	"I"	My Hero Academia: Final Season (season 8)	Bump of Chicken, storyboard and direction by Hanako Ueda
2025 (10th)	"Actor"	Spy × Family (season 3)	Lilas Ikuta, storyboard and direction by Naoki Miyajima
2025 (10th)	"Beautiful Colors"	Kaiju No. 8 (season 2)	OneRepublic, storyboard and direction by Haruo Okuno
2025 (10th)	"Doukashiteru"	Dandadan (season 2)	WurtS, storyboard and direction by Komugiko2000
2025 (10th)	"Kawaii Kaiwai"	My Dress-Up Darling (season 2)	PiKi, direction by Vivinos
2025 (10th)	"Un-Apex"	Solo Leveling: Arise from the Shadow (season 2)	TK from Ling Tosite Sigure, direction by Hiromu Ōshiro

== Records ==
=== Anime series ===
Franchise	Wins	Nominations	Seasons
Jujutsu Kaisen	2		Season 1, Season 2
Attack on Titan	1	3	Season 3, The Final Season Part 1, The Final Season Part 2
Spy × Family	1	3	Season 1 cour 1, Season 1 cour 2, Season 3
Demon Slayer: Kimetsu no Yaiba	1	2	Mugen Train Arc, Swordsmith Village Arc
Kaguya-sama: Love Is War	1	2	Season 1, Ultra Romantic
Solo Leveling	1	2	Season 1, Arise from the Shadow
Dandadan	0	2	Season 1, Season 2
Kaiju No. 8	0	2	Season 1, Season 2
My Dress-Up Darling	0	2	Season 1, Season 2
Oshi no Ko	0	2	Season 1, Season 2

=== Artist ===
Currently, no artist has both won and nominated in different years for an award more than once. The following artists that has the most nominations without a win below:

Artist	Wins	Nominations	Anime
Aimer	0	3	After the Rain, Kabaneri of the Iron Fortress, Vinland Saga
OneRepublic	0	2	Kaiju No. 8 (Season 1, Season 2)
The Pillows	0	2	FLCL Progressive (Season 2), FLCL Alternative (Season 3)
