= Kaguya-sama: Love Is War? =

2020 romance comedy anime

- Season 2
- No. of episodes: 12

Release
- Original network: MBS, Tokyo MX, BS11, GTV, GYT, CTV, TeNY
- Original release: April 11 – June 27, 2020

Season chronology
- ← Previous; Season 1 Next → Love Is War – Ultra Romantic

The second season of the Kaguya-sama: Love Is War anime television series produced by A-1 Pictures, titled Kaguya-sama: Love Is War?, is based on the manga series Kaguya-sama: Love Is War by Aka Akasaka. It was announced on October 19, 2019. The staff and cast returned to reprise their roles. The season premiered from April 11 to June 27, 2020, on the same Japanese stations as the first, though its world premiere took place prior to Japanese broadcast at Anime Festival Sydney on March 8, 2020. As theme music, the season uses Masayuki Suzuki's "Daddy! Daddy! Do! feat. Airi Suzuki" as the opening theme while using Haruka Fukuhara's "Kaze ni Fukarete" (lit. "Blown by the Wind") as the ending theme.

In Southeast Asia, Muse Communication released the season on Netflix, bilibili, and iQIYI.

== Episodes ==
Story	Episode	Title	Directed by	Written by	Original release date
13	1	"Ai Hayasaka Wants to Stave Them Off"; Transliteration: "Hayasaka Ai wa Fusegitai" (Japanese: 早坂愛は防ぎたい)	Tsuyoshi Tobita	Yasuhiro Nakanishi	April 11, 2020
13	1	"The Student Council Has Not Achieved Nirvana"; Transliteration: "Seitokai wa Kamittenai" (Japanese: 生徒会は神ってない)	Tsuyoshi Tobita	Yasuhiro Nakanishi	April 11, 2020
13	1	"Kaguya Wants to Get Married"; Transliteration: "Kaguya-sama wa Kekkonshitai" (Japanese: かぐや様は結婚したい)	Tsuyoshi Tobita	Yasuhiro Nakanishi	April 11, 2020
13	1	"Kaguya Wants to Celebrate"; Transliteration: "Kaguya-sama wa Iwaitai" (Japanese: かぐや様は祝いたい)	Tsuyoshi Tobita	Yasuhiro Nakanishi	April 11, 2020
On Kaguya's words, Ai switches Miyuki's coffee for a decaffeinated version, causing him to fall asleep; to Kaguya's chagrin, he sleeps on her shoulder, causing her to ask Ai to prevent anyone from entering the Student Council room. Nagisa's boyfriend approaches Miyuki and Yu for further romantic advice, though the two—later joined by Kaguya and Chika—watch in disbelief when the couple begin engaging in suggestive acts. The Student Council plays a board game created by Chika. With Miyuki's birthday on the horizon, Kaguya tries to coerce him into publicly revealing the date via horoscopes.
14	2	"Kaguya Wants to Know"; Transliteration: "Kaguya-sama wa Kikidashitai" (Japanese: かぐや様は聞き出したい)	Tarō Kubo	Yasuhiro Nakanishi	April 18, 2020
14	2	"Kaguya Wants to Give a Gift"; Transliteration: "Kaguya-sama wa Okuritai" (Japanese: かぐや様は贈りたい)	Tarō Kubo	Yasuhiro Nakanishi	April 18, 2020
14	2	"Chika Fujiwara Wants to Confirm It"; Transliteration: "Fujiwara Chika wa Tashikametai" (Japanese: 藤原千花は確かめたい)	Tarō Kubo	Yasuhiro Nakanishi	April 18, 2020
Kaguya goes on a shopping trip with Kei and the Fujiwara sisters, where she tries to grow closer to the former. On Miyuki's birthday, Kaguya bakes an absurdly large cake that leads to conflict in her mind as to whether she should give it to him. After Miyuki receives a fan from Kaguya as a present, Chika becomes suspicious as to why only Kaguya celebrated his birthday.
15	3	"Miyuki Shirogane Wants to Gaze at the Moon"; Transliteration: "Shirogane Miyuki wa Miagetai" (Japanese: 白銀御行は見上げたい)	Abe Yūjirō	Yukie Sugawara	April 25, 2020
15	3	"The 67th Student Council"; Transliteration: "Dai 67-ki Seitokai" (Japanese: 第67期生徒会)	Abe Yūjirō	Yukie Sugawara	April 25, 2020
15	3	"Kaguya Doesn't Want to Say It"; Transliteration: "Kaguya-sama wa Yobitakunai" (Japanese: かぐや様は呼びたくない)	Abe Yūjirō	Yukie Sugawara	April 25, 2020
With the end of their terms looming, the Student Council goes stargazing on the roof, where Kaguya's plans quickly fall apart due to Miyuki's enthusiasm about discussing the Moon. The council members conclude their duties by cleaning out the room before leaving. The four discuss their future plans, though Kaguya wishes for Miyuki to run for re-election.
16	4	"Ai Hayasaka Wants Him to Fall for Her"; Transliteration: "Hayasaka Ai wa Otoshitai" (Japanese: 早坂愛はオトしたい)	Aya Ikeda	Yukie Sugawara	May 2, 2020
16	4	"Kaguya Wants to Be Confessed To"; Transliteration: "Kaguya-sama wa Kokura"re"tai" (Japanese: かぐや様は告ら"れ"たい)	Aya Ikeda	Yukie Sugawara	May 2, 2020
16	4	"Miko Iino Wants to Set Things Right"; Transliteration: "Iino Miko wa Tadashitai" (Japanese: 伊井野ミコは正したい)	Aya Ikeda	Yukie Sugawara	May 2, 2020
Ai is challenged by Kaguya to make Miyuki fall in love with her. Miyuki attempts to ask Kaguya to be his campaign speech manager, but the school misinterprets his intentions as a confession. As the election nears, Miyuki meets his main opponent Miko Iino and her friend Kobachi Osaragi, the former of whom quickly tries to recruit Chika to her side.
17	5	"Miyuki Shirogane Wants Girls to Fall for Him"; Transliteration: "Shirogane Miyuki wa Motetai" (Japanese: 白銀御行はモテたい)	Takayuki Kikuchi	Yasuhiro Nakanishi	May 9, 2020
17	5	"Nagisa Kashiwagi Wants to Console"; Transliteration: "Kashiwagi Nagisa wa Nagusametai" (Japanese: 柏木渚は慰めたい)	Takayuki Kikuchi	Yasuhiro Nakanishi	May 9, 2020
17	5	"Miyuki Shirogane Wants to Sing"; Transliteration: "Shirogane Miyuki wa Utaitai" (Japanese: 白銀御行は歌いたい)	Takayuki Kikuchi	Yasuhiro Nakanishi	May 9, 2020
17	5	"Kaguya Wants to Kick Them Down"; Transliteration: "Kaguya-sama wa Keotoshitai" (Japanese: かぐや様は蹴落としたい)	Takayuki Kikuchi	Yasuhiro Nakanishi	May 9, 2020
Miyuki comes to school with handsome eyes as he finally has a balanced sleep schedule, to Kaguya's dismay. Conflicted about his new appearance Kaguya talks to Nagisa about the meaning of true love. Chika teaches Miyuki to sing after discovering he had been lip-syncing the school anthem. Kaguya attempts to negotiate with Miko to withdraw from the election, only for the discussion to fall apart.
18	6	"I Don't Want to Make Miko Iino Smile"; Transliteration: "Iino Miko o Warawasenai" (Japanese: 伊井野ミコを笑わせない)	Kuniyasu Nishina	Yasuhiro Nakanishi	May 16, 2020
18	6	"I Want to Make Miko Iino Smile"; Transliteration: "Iino Miko o Warawasetai" (Japanese: 伊井野ミコを笑わせたい)	Kuniyasu Nishina	Yasuhiro Nakanishi	May 16, 2020
18	6	"Kaguya Isn't Getting Called"; Transliteration: "Kaguya-sama wa Yobarenai" (Japanese: かぐや様は呼ばれない)	Kuniyasu Nishina	Yasuhiro Nakanishi	May 16, 2020
On Election Day, Kobachi and Kaguya give their candidates' speeches, during which Miko realizes she is outmatched. When Miko begins to falter due to the large crowd watching, Miyuki steps in and inspires her to start a debate. Miyuki eventually wins re-election and invites Miko to join the Student Council, while Kaguya worries that she might not be selected as vice president due to her actions during the election until Miyuki re-offers her the position.
19	7	"Kaguya Wants to Undress Him"; Transliteration: "Kaguya-sama wa Nugasetai" (Japanese: かぐや様は脱がせたい)	Aya Ikeda	Yukie Sugawara	May 23, 2020
19	7	"Kaguya Wants to Make Him Let Go"; Transliteration: "Kaguya-sama wa Dasasetai" (Japanese: かぐや様は出させたい)	Aya Ikeda	Yukie Sugawara	May 23, 2020
19	7	"Miyuki Shirogane Wants to Make Her Read"; Transliteration: "Shirogane Miyuki wa Yomasetai" (Japanese: 白銀御行は読ませたい)	Aya Ikeda	Yukie Sugawara	May 23, 2020
19	7	"Kaguya ♡ Aquarium"; Transliteration: "Kaguya-sama ♡ Akuariumu" (Japanese: かぐや様♡アクアリウム)	Aya Ikeda	Yukie Sugawara	May 23, 2020
After hearing Yu describe men who wear boxers as "man whores", Kaguya attempts to see Miyuki's underwear. Kaguya offers to give Miyuki a hand massage as an apology for the underwear misunderstanding, but she also has ulterior motives to increase his sexual interest in her. Miyuki, Yu, and Chika read an especially emotional shōjo manga and try to convince Kaguya to do the same. When Kaguya reads the manga, the Student Council room becomes a shōjo-like, love-filled environment as Miyuki and Yu attempt to invite her to the aquarium.
20	8	"Miko Iino Wants to Control Herself"; Transliteration: "Iino Miko wa Osaetai" (Japanese: 伊井野ミコは抑えたい)	Tsuyoshi Tobita	Yukie Sugawara	May 30, 2020
20	8	"Kaguya Doesn't Scare Easily"; Transliteration: "Kaguya-sama wa Obienai" (Japanese: かぐや様は怯えない)	Tsuyoshi Tobita	Yukie Sugawara	May 30, 2020
20	8	"Kaguya Wants to Be Examined"; Transliteration: "Kaguya-sama wa Miraretai" (Japanese: かぐや様は診られたい)	Tsuyoshi Tobita	Yukie Sugawara	May 30, 2020
When Miko rants about what she believes is a toxic environment in the Student Council, the others urge her to practice restraining her anger as they simulate breaking school rules. Miyuki and Kaguya get locked in the sports equipment storage room, which they each believe is the other's attempt to get closer. Kaguya suddenly collapses and is taken to the hospital, where she is told she is suffering from lovesickness.
21	9	"Yu Ishigami Closes His Eyes, Part 2"; Transliteration: "Soshite Ishigami Yū wa Me o Tojita 2" (Japanese: そして石上優は目を閉じた②)	Ryota Aikei	Yasuhiro Nakanishi	June 6, 2020
21	9	"Kaguya Wants to Touch"; Transliteration: "Kaguya-sama wa Sawaritai" (Japanese: かぐや様は触りたい)	Ryota Aikei	Yasuhiro Nakanishi	June 6, 2020
21	9	"Kaguya Doesn't Say No"; Transliteration: "Kaguya-sama wa Kotowaranai" (Japanese: かぐや様は断らない)	Ryota Aikei	Yasuhiro Nakanishi	June 6, 2020
Miko and Kobachi analyze the former's misunderstandings with Kaguya and Miyuki, only for Miko to misinterpret them as Kaguya being a dominatrix towards the Student Council. Rattled by the storage room incident, Kaguya devises a relaxation routine of placing her right hand on her left cheek. Yu joins the cheerleading squad for the school festival and is tasked with wearing a female uniform, for which Kaguya offers to help.
22	10	"Kei Shirogane Can't Speak"; Transliteration: "Shirogane Kei wa Hanasenai" (Japanese: 白銀圭は話せない)	Takayuki Kikuchi	Yukie Sugawara	June 13, 2020
22	10	"Miyuki Shirogane Wants to Dance"; Transliteration: "Shirogane Miyuki wa Odoritai" (Japanese: 白銀御行は踊りたい)	Takayuki Kikuchi	Yukie Sugawara	June 13, 2020
22	10	"Kobachi Osaragi Wants to Crack Down"; Transliteration: "Osaragi Kobachi wa Torishimaritai" (Japanese: 大仏こばちは取り締まりたい)	Takayuki Kikuchi	Yukie Sugawara	June 13, 2020
22	10	"Miyuki Shirogane's Dad Wants to Find Out"; Transliteration: "Shirogane Chichi wa Kikidashitai" (Japanese: 白銀父は聞き出したい)	Takayuki Kikuchi	Yukie Sugawara	June 13, 2020
Suspecting that her brother is in love, Kei attempts to coerce Miyuki into divulging details without appearing to be prying. Chika's attempts to teach Miyuki the Sōran Bushi dance fail, though Kaguya instead helps him, to her annoyance. While observing Yu, Kobachi reveals he had been ostracized after allegedly assaulting the boyfriend of a girl he liked in junior high; despite Yu's feud with Miko, she adds the two had discreetly supported each other. Miyuki's father attends the sports festival, where he asks Kaguya about her relationship with his son.
23	11	"Yu Ishigami Closes His Eyes, Part 3"; Transliteration: "Soshite Ishigami Yū wa Me o Tojita 3" (Japanese: そして石上優は目を閉じた③)	Suzuki Moe	Yukie Sugawara	June 20, 2020
23	11	"Miyuki Shirogane and Yu Ishigami"; Transliteration: "Shirogane Miyuki to Ishigami Yū" (Japanese: 白銀御行と石上優)	Suzuki Moe	Yukie Sugawara	June 20, 2020
23	11	"Kyoko Otomo Doesn't Realize"; Transliteration: "Otomo Kyōko wa Kizukanai" (Japanese: 大友京子は気づかない)	Suzuki Moe	Yukie Sugawara	June 20, 2020
Prior to participating in the festival relay, Yu encounters his junior high classmate Kyoko Otomo. He reveals he had been shunned by his peers after attacking her boyfriend when he discovered he was cheating on her, leading to Yu's suspension; although disillusioned and vengeful, he is visited by Miyuki and is vindicated after the Student Council launches an investigation. Yu ultimately loses in the relay, but the support he receives from the cheerleading squad enables him to open his eyes and accept them.
24	12	"The Student Council Would Like a Group Photo"; Transliteration: "Seitokai wa Toraretai" (Japanese: 生徒会は撮られたい)	Abe Yujiro	Yasuhiro Nakanishi	June 27, 2020
24	12	"The Student Council is Going to Get That Group Photo"; Transliteration: "Seitokai wa Torasetai" (Japanese: 生徒会は撮らせたい)	Abe Yujiro	Yasuhiro Nakanishi	June 27, 2020
24	12	"Chika Fujiwara Wants to Inflate"; Transliteration: "Fujiwara Chika wa Fukuramasetai" (Japanese: 藤原千花は膨らませたい)	Abe Yujiro	Yasuhiro Nakanishi	June 27, 2020
The headmaster takes pictures of the Student Council for a pamphlet promoting the school, but when he offers to take a group photo with Kaguya's flip phone, it is blown off the roof by a gust of wind. Although she gets a smartphone, Kaguya is heartbroken at the loss of the photos on her original phone, which the Student Council strives to resolve by uploading their own pictures to a LINE group chat. The Student Council plays a balloon inflation game, with Kaguya, Miyuki, and Yu initially showing confidence thanks to their experiences before immediately panicking upon reaching their turn.
