= Aoi Koga =

Japanese voice actress (born 1993)

- 古賀 葵
- Born: August 24, 1993 (age 33); Saga Prefecture, Japan
- Occupation: Voice actress
- Years active: 2014–present
- Agent: 81 Produce

Aoi Koga (古賀 葵, Koga Aoi; born August 24, 1993) is a Japanese voice actress from Saga Prefecture who is affiliated with 81 Produce. She started her voice acting career in 2014 after being inspired to do so at a young age. She played her first main role as Sora Kaneshiro in Angel's 3Piece! in 2017.

Koga is known for her roles as Yuri Ashida and Juli Liszt in Aikatsu Stars!, Yuri Miyata in Two Car, Kaguya Shinomiya in Kaguya-sama: Love Is War, Shouko Komi in Komi Can't Communicate, Ange le Carré in Princess Principal: Crown Handler, and Princess Ellee/Cure Majesty in Hirogaru Sky! Precure. She was part of the musical group Baby's Breath together with the other main cast members of Angel's 3Piece!. Koga also appeared as a cameo in the live-action film adaptation of Kaguya-sama: Love is War. She has received multiple awards, including Best Actress in a Leading Role at the 14th Seiyu Awards.

== Biography ==
=== Early life ===
Koga was born in Saga Prefecture on August 24, 1993. She had an interest in anime since her childhood, watching series such as Cardcaptor Sakura and Ojamajo Doremi. She was first introduced to voice acting while watching the children's television program Okaasan to Issho and becoming fond of the puppet segments featured in the show. This inspired her desire to "become friends with dolls", which along with her interest in anime, influenced her decision to pursue a career in entertainment. She ultimately decided to pursue a career in voice acting after learning about the profession featured in a program she watched.

Koga joined her school's softball club while in junior high, and later the light music club in high school. When growing up, she experienced a sense of embarrassment regarding her interest in anime among her peers. Coupled with her shy personality and difficulties expressing herself in public, she initially concealed from others her career aspiration in voice acting. Even if some would ask her if she wanted to be a voice actress, she would instead reply about wanting to become a hairdresser or pet groomer instead.

=== Acting career ===
After informing her family about her plans to pursue voice acting, Koga felt discouraged as she would require moving to Tokyo for work, which she did not view as practical at the time. Upon her parents' suggestion, she began taking acting lessons at a vocational school in Fukuoka. After completing her training, she enrolled in the training school of 81 Produce, a voice acting agency, on the recommendation of a teacher and became affiliated with the company upon graduation.

Koga's first credited role in an anime was a woman in Rokka: Braves of the Six Flowers. In 2017, she was cast as the character Sora Kaneshiro in Angel's 3Piece!; she also became part of the band Baby's Breath along with Yūko Ōno and Yurika Endō, her co-stars in the series. She was later cast as Yuri Miyata in Two Car, where she performed the series' ending theme "Angelica Wind" together with her co-star Aimi Tanaka.

In 2019, Koga played the role of Kaguya Shinomiya in Kaguya-sama: Love Is War, for which she won Best Actress in a Leading Role at the 14th Seiyu Awards. She also made a cameo as a movie theater employee in the live-action film adaptation of Kaguya-sama: Love is War. In 2020, she was cast as the Japanese voice of Paimon in the mobile game Genshin Impact. In 2021, she voiced Shouko Komi in Komi Can't Communicate and Aki Shino in Remake Our Life!. In 2023, she played Konoha Akisato in the anime television series 16bit Sensation: Another Layer; she also performed the series' ending theme "Link: Past and Future". Koga has won Best Voice Actress twice at the Newtype Anime Awards.

=== Personal life ===
Koga has an older brother with whom she used to fight in judo. She has an interest in manhole covers, finding it interesting how they can come in different shapes and have different characters on them. Koga can also play the drums, which she learned while in junior high school.

== Filmography ==
=== Anime ===
Year	Title	Role	Other notes
2015	Jewelpet: Magical Change		
2015	Rokka: Braves of the Six Flowers	Woman	
2015	Owarimonogatari	Classmate	
2015	Beautiful Bones: Sakurako's Investigation	Mari	
2016	Beyblade Burst	Momoko Ogi	
2016	JoJo's Bizarre Adventure	Akemi	Season 3
2016	Aikatsu Stars!	Airi Amemiya / Umi Kaiyama / Yuri Ashida / Juli Liszt	
2016	Kiznaiver	Female Student	
2016	Shounen Ashibe GO! GO! Goma-chan	Yumiko-chan	
2016	Haven't You Heard? I'm Sakamoto	Schoolgirl	
2016	Naria Girls	Hanabi	
2017	Beyblade Burst God	Honey Guten	
2017	Angel's 3Piece!	Sora Kaneshiro	
2017	Two Car	Yuri Miyata	
2018	Back Street Girls	Sachiko	
2018	I Want You To Show Me Your Panties With a Disgusted Face	Misuzu Tanahashi	ONA
2018–2021	Zombie Land Saga	Maria Amabuki	
2019	The Magnificent Kotobuki	Betty	
2019	Fairy Gone	Chima	
2019	Demon Slayer: Kimetsu no Yaiba	Rokuta Kamado	
2019	Wise Man's Grandchild	Christina Hayden	
2019	A Certain Scientific Accelerator	Naruha Sakuragi	
2019	Cautious Hero: The Hero Is Overpowered but Overly Cautious	Elulu	
2019	Kemono Michi: Rise Up	Ceris	
2019	The Demon Girl Next Door	Dog Lady	
2019	Chidori RSC	Ruri Hachigo	
2019–2022	Kaguya-sama: Love Is War	Kaguya Shinomiya	Lead role
2020	Asteroid in Love	Sayuri Ibe	
2020	A Certain Scientific Railgun T	Naruha Sakuragi	
2020	Super HxEros	Chiya Hoya	
2020	Akudama Drive	Young Girl	
2021	Horimiya	Yuna Okuyama	
2021	Full Dive	Kaede Yūki	
2021	How Not to Summon a Demon Lord Ω	Rose	
2021	Remake Our Life!	Aki Shino	
2021	Blue Period	Yamamoto	
2021	My Senpai Is Annoying	Mona Tsukishiro	
2021	180-Byō de Kimi no Mimi o Shiawase ni Dekiru ka?	Kanako	
2021	Princess Principal: Crown Handler	Ange	Film
2021	Cute Executive Officer	Nowani	ONA
2021–2022	Komi Can't Communicate	Shouko Komi	Lead role
2021–2022	Build Divide	Hiyori Munenashi	
2022	In the Heart of Kunoichi Tsubaki	Ajisai	
2022	Shine Post	Natalya	
2022	To Your Eternity	Pocoa	Season 2
2022	Beast Tamer	Mina	
2022	Kaguya-sama: Love Is War – The First Kiss That Never Ends	Kaguya Shinomiya	Film
2022	Kakegurui Twin	Mikura Sado	ONA
2023	Hirogaru Sky! Precure	Princess Ellee / Cure Majesty	
2023	Mashle	Love Cute	
2023	Horimiya: The Missing Pieces	Yuna Okuyama	
2023	Synduality: Noir	Noir / Mystere	
2023	16bit Sensation: Another Layer	Konoha Akisato	
2023	The Family Circumstances of the Irregular Witch	Alissa	
2023	Girlfriend, Girlfriend	Risa Hoshizaki	Season 2
2023	You Were Experienced, I Was Not: Our Dating Story	Maria Kurose	
2023	Fate/strange Fake: Whispers of Dawn	Tsubaki Kuruoka	Film
2023	Cute Executive Officer R	Nowani	ONA
2024	Whisper Me a Love Song	Miki Mizuguchi	
2024	Gushing over Magical Girls	Kiwi Araga / Leopard	
2024	Sakuna: Of Rice and Ruin	Yui	
2024	Let This Grieving Soul Retire!	Lucia Rogier	
2024	Quality Assurance in Another World	Kinoshita	
2024	Ōmuro-ke	Misaki Takasaki	Film
2025	Magic Maker: How to Make Magic in Another World	Brigitte	
2025	From Bureaucrat to Villainess: Dad's Been Reincarnated!	Lucas Vierge	
2025	I May Be a Guild Receptionist, But I'll Solo Any Boss to Clock Out on Time	Lululee Ashford	
2025	Flower and Asura	Xiangling	
2025	I'm a Noble on the Brink of Ruin, So I Might as Well Try Mastering Magic	Flora	
2025	Kowloon Generic Romance	Yaomay	
2025	Mono	An Kiriyama	
2025	Dealing with Mikadono Sisters Is a Breeze	Niko Mikadono	
2025	Ganglion	Setsuko Isobe	
2025	Fate/strange Fake	Tsubaki Kuruoka	
2026	Mistress Kanan Is Devilishly Easy	Kanan Takakiyo	Lead role
2026	Dara-san of Reiwa	Amane Hasegawa	
2026	The Villager of Level 999	Tina	
2026	The World's Strongest Rearguard	Theresia	
2026	The 100 Girlfriends Who Really, Really, Really, Really, Really Love You	Momiji Momi	Season 3
2026	Cyberpunk: Edgerunners 2	Capri	

=== Video games ===
Year	Title	Role	Other notes
2016	Girls' Frontline	FNP-9 / M950A	
2019	Honkai Impact 3rd	Rozaliya Olenyeva	
2019	Dragalia Lost	Catherine	
2019	Sword Art Online: Integral Factor	Sanya	
2020	Genshin Impact	Paimon	Main role
2020	Granblue Fantasy	Mireille	
2020	Dead or Alive Xtreme Venus Vacation	Lobelia	
2021	Action Taimanin	Shisui Amamiya / Noah Brown	
2021	Azur Lane	Nicoloso da Recco	
2021	Alchemy Stars	Pact	
2021	Cookie Run: Kingdom	Pastry Cookie	
2021	Magia Record	Kushu Irina	
2021	White Cat Project	Ristie	
2021	MapleStory	Lara	
2022	Heaven Burns Red	Tama Kunimi	
2022	Fate/Grand Order	Kriemhild	
2022	The Legend of Heroes: Trails Through Daybreak II	Jolda	
2022	Xenoblade Chronicles 3	Ino	
2022	Path to Nowhere	Hella	
2023	Da Capo 5	Kako Yasaka	
2023	Loop8: Summer of Gods	Ichika	
2024	Gakuen Idolmaster	Asari Neo	
2025	Atelier Resleriana: The Red Alchemist & the White Guardian	El Bell	
2025	Stella Sora	Mystique	
2025	Strinova	Chiyo	
2026	Kyoto Xanadu	Rurui	

=== Other projects ===
Year	Title	Role	Other notes
2019	Kaguya-sama: Love Is War	Movie Theater Staff	Live-action film
2020	Thomas & Friends	Gabriela / Darcy / Cleo	Dubbing
2020	Toyota Raize	Luna	Commercial
2021	Voice: 110 Emergency Control Room 2	Tomoko Murata	TV series
2022	Link Click	Qiao Ling/Rin	Dubbing
2023	Scott Pilgrim Takes Off	Knives Chau	Dubbing
