= Kaguya-sama: Love Is War – Ultra Romantic =

2022 romance comedy anime

- Season 3
- No. of episodes: 13

Release
- Original network: Tokyo MX, BS11, GTV, GYT, MBS, RKB, TeNY
- Original release: April 9 – June 25, 2022

Season chronology
- ← Previous; Love Is War?

The third season of the Kaguya-sama: Love Is War anime television series produced by A-1 Pictures, titled Kaguya-sama: Love Is War – Ultra Romantic, is based on the manga series Kaguya-sama: Love Is War by Aka Akasaka. It was announced on October 25, 2020, for production during the "Kaguya-sama Wants To Tell You On Stage" special event. The season aired from April 9 to June 25, 2022, with returning staff and cast members. The opening theme song is "GIRI GIRI" by Masayuki Suzuki featuring Suu from Silent Siren, while the ending theme is "Heart wa Oteage" ("My Heart Does Not Know What to Do") by Airi Suzuki. In episode 5, the ending theme song is "My Nonfiction" by Makoto Furukawa and Konomi Kohara as their characters of Miyuki and Chika, respectively. The season finale aired on June 25 as a double episode has "Sentimental Crisis" by Halca as an insert song.

== Episodes ==
Story	Episode	Title	Directed by	Written by	Original release date
25	1	"Miko Iino Wants to Be Soothed"; Transliteration: "Iino Miko wa Iyasaretai" (Japanese: 伊井野ミコは癒されたい)	Mamoru Hatakeyama	Yasuhiro Nakanishi	April 9, 2022
25	1	"Kaguya Doesn't Realize"; Transliteration: "Kaguya-sama wa Kizukanai" (Japanese: かぐや様は気づかない)	Mamoru Hatakeyama	Yasuhiro Nakanishi	April 9, 2022
25	1	"Chika Fujiwara Wants to Battle"; Transliteration: "Fujiwara Chika wa Tatakaitai" (Japanese: 藤原千花は闘いたい)	Takayuki Kikuchi	Yasuhiro Nakanishi	April 9, 2022
Noticing that Miko did not plug in her headphones completely, Yu attempts to warn her by deliberately playing music aloud with his headphones on, but fails. Miyuki phones Kaguya after she doesn't respond to his text messages that are marked as read; Ai responds falsely that they always leave the messaging application open on an unmonitored computer. The student council plays an arm wrestling competition; Kaguya wins.
26	2	"Miyuki Shirogane Wants to Mediate"; Transliteration: "Shirogane Miyuki wa Torimochitai" (Japanese: 白銀御行は取り持ちたい)	Masakazu Obara	Yasuhiro Nakanishi	April 16, 2022
26	2	"Kaguya Wants to Distract Him"; Transliteration: "Kaguya-sama wa Tsuredashitai" (Japanese: かぐや様は連れ出したい)	Masakazu Obara	Yasuhiro Nakanishi	April 16, 2022
26	2	"Kaguya Preemptively Strikes"; Transliteration: "Kaguya-sama wa Soshishitai" (Japanese: かぐや様は阻止したい)	Masakazu Obara	Yasuhiro Nakanishi	April 16, 2022
Miyuki and Kobachi devise ways for Yu and Miko to get along together, noticing they view one another with disdain. Kobachi tells the two they are in denial, making them mend. Upon hearing Miyuki's acceptance to attend a karaoke party, Kaguya sends Ai undercover as Herthaka to the event to prevent other girls from interacting with him and to convince him to leave. Ai, envious of Kaguya's recent upbeat mood, entices him into a room alone in an attempt to make Kaguya jealous. When Miyuki goes to the restroom, Kaguya takes Ai home, who is exhausted due to his inability to rap.
27	3	"Nagisa Kashiwagi Wants to Kill"; Transliteration: "Kashiwagi Nagisa wa Chūshitai" (Japanese: 柏木渚は誅したい)	Aya Ikeda	Yukie Sugawara	April 23, 2022
27	3	"Maki Shijo Wants to Take Action"; Transliteration: "Shijō Maki wa Nantoka Shitai" (Japanese: 四条眞妃は何とかしたい)	Aya Ikeda	Yukie Sugawara	April 23, 2022
27	3	"Miyuki Shirogane Wants to Be Believed"; Transliteration: "Shirogane Miyuki wa Shinjiraretai" (Japanese: 白銀御行は信じられたい)	Aya Ikeda	Yukie Sugawara	April 23, 2022
Nagisa visits the student council under the belief that her boyfriend is cheating on her with Maki; she determines that the two are interacting together immensely. Nagisa confronts her boyfriend, where he reveals that he asked Maki to choose his gift for her. Miyuki and Yu meet Maki, who confesses her innate desire to steal Nagisa's boyfriend from her. Overhearing Miyuki's conversation about the karaoke event, Kaguya suggests the student council play a group dating game. Miyuki lets her know after the game that he did leave with a girl but did not have any illicit intentions. Satisfied, Kaguya leaves while cryptically answering him back.
28	4	"Kaguya Shinomiya's Impossible Demand: "A Cowrie a Swallow Gave Birth To" Part 1"; Transliteration: "Shinomiya Kaguya no Muri Nandai "Tsubame no Koyasugai" Hen Ichi" (Japanese: 四宮かぐやの無理難題「燕の子安貝」編①)	Tsuyoshi Tobita	Yukie Sugawara	April 30, 2022
28	4	"Yu Ishigami Wants to Prove Himself Worthy"; Transliteration: "Ishigami Yū wa Kotaetai" (Japanese: 石上優はこたえたい)	Tsuyoshi Tobita	Yukie Sugawara	April 30, 2022
28	4	"Chika Fujiwara Wants to Stay Over"; Transliteration: "Fujiwara Chika wa Tomaritai" (Japanese: 藤原千花は泊まりたい)	Tsuyoshi Tobita	Yukie Sugawara	April 30, 2022
Yu likes Tsubame, a third-year student who previously helped him out at a sports festival. However, with his lack of self-esteem, he believes it is impossible to ask her out, but Kaguya supports him; she wants him to get a top 50 academy score in the upcoming final exams. Yu does not make the top 50 in his grade. Feeling guilty and bitter, he vows to succeed next semester. Chika and Kaguya have a sleepover at Kaguya's residence. They phone Miyuki and ask about the person he likes; Kei answers with Herthaka, whom he had become friends with, leading to a misunderstanding as Ai is cross-dressing as Kaguya's butler under the same pseudonym.
29	5	"Chika Fujiwara Wants to Beat a Rhythm"; Transliteration: "Fujiwara Chika wa Kizamitai" (Japanese: 藤原千花は刻みたい)	Takayuki Kikuchi	Yasuhiro Nakanishi	May 7, 2022
29	5	"Ai Hayasaka Wants to Talk"; Transliteration: "Hayasaka Ai wa Hanashitai" (Japanese: 早坂愛は話したい)	Takayuki Kikuchi	Yasuhiro Nakanishi	May 7, 2022
29	5	"Maki Shijo Wants Some Help"; Transliteration: "Shijō Maki wa Tayoritai" (Japanese: 四条眞妃は頼りたい)	Takayuki Kikuchi	Yasuhiro Nakanishi	May 7, 2022
Miyuki wants to convey a heartfelt message to Ai through rap, so he and Chika teach each other to rap. After inviting Ai to the meeting, she and Kaguya show up to listen in. Ai finally finds relief when she expresses her "true desires" to Kaguya; her need for a male friend and to live her life as a normal teenager. Finding Maki crying in the student council room, Yu and Miyuki talk with her about Tsubasa, Nagisa's boyfriend. The three discuss their internal struggles with confessing to their respective crushes.
30	6	"The Student Council Wants to Move Forward"; Transliteration: "Seitokai wa Susumitai" (Japanese: 生徒会は進みたい)	Motoki Nakanishi	Yasuhiro Nakanishi	May 14, 2022
30	6	"Miyuki Shirogane Wants to Make Her Confess, Part 2"; Transliteration: "Shirogane Miyuki wa Kokurasetai Ni" (Japanese: 白銀御行は告らせたい②)	Motoki Nakanishi	Yasuhiro Nakanishi	May 14, 2022
30	6	"Miyuki Shirogane Wants to Make Her Confess, Part 3"; Transliteration: "Shirogane Miyuki wa Kokurasetai San" (Japanese: 白銀御行は告らせたい③)	Motoki Nakanishi	Yasuhiro Nakanishi	May 14, 2022
At a parent–teacher conference, Kaguya's father is unable to come so Ai's mother and Miyuki's father step in. The second-year students discuss their futures, with the notable ones being Kaguya's intention to continue studying at the academy's University and Miyuki choosing to study abroad at Stanford. Miyuki also declares if he can't get Kaguya to confess before the upcoming Kita high Culture Festival, he will do it himself. Miyuki—without confessing—asks Kaguya out on a date to the festival; Kaguya subconsciously declines at first, but later invites him as well. However, they get interrupted by the other student council members, and he agrees to be accompanied by Yu. Chika criticizes Miyuki's singing, who asks her and Miko for their opinions about his masculinity. They discuss the preferred personality of a man, with Kaguya and Yu joining in.
31	7	"Miko Iino Can't Love, Part 1"; Transliteration: "Iino Miko wa Aisenai Ichi" (Japanese: 伊井野ミコは愛せない①)	Yuki Watanabe	Yukie Sugawara	May 21, 2022
31	7	"Students Wish to Discuss the Culture Festival"; Transliteration: "Bunkasai o Kataritai" (Japanese: 文化祭を語りたい)	Yuki Watanabe	Yukie Sugawara	May 21, 2022
31	7	"Miyuki Shirogane Wants to Blow It Up"; Transliteration: "Shirogane Miyuki wa Fukuramasetai" (Japanese: 白銀御行は膨らませたい)	Yuki Watanabe	Yukie Sugawara	May 21, 2022
Yu and Miko help the Culture Festival Committee host a campfire event and inform the neighborhood due to strict fire hazard regulations. Karen Kino and Erika Kose from the Mass Media Club interview several students during the event preparation including Kaguya, Tsubame, Momo Ryuju, Miyuki, and Chika at the Board Game Club. Miyuki struggles to twist any balloons without popping them. He brings the box of balloons into the student council room to avoid disturbance but pops all of them.
32	8	"Kei Shirogane Wants to Show Off"; Transliteration: "Shirogane Kei wa Misetsuketai" (Japanese: 白銀圭は見せつけたい)	Nobukage Kimura	Yukie Sugawara	May 28, 2022
32	8	"About Kaguya Shinomiya, Part 2"; Transliteration: "Shinomiya Kaguya ni Tsuite Ni" (Japanese: 四宮かぐやについて②)	Nobukage Kimura	Yukie Sugawara	May 28, 2022
32	8	"Kaguya Wants to Confess"; Transliteration: "Kaguya-sama wa Tsugeritai" (Japanese: かぐや様は告りたい)	Nobukage Kimura	Yukie Sugawara	May 28, 2022
Kei wants Miyuki to dress properly when going to the middle school culture festival; she despises the amount unnecessary details on his clothing. Failing to find any preferable clothes for him, they buy them together. Kaguya receives a heart-shaped keychain from Tsubame, who tells her a legend about getting eternal love when someone receives it during the Hoshin Culture Festival. At the festival preparation, Kaguya intends to gift Miyuki the keychain but stops herself, realizing he's exhausted. Kaguya meets Yu, talking to himself about his chance to confess to Tsubame, and encourages him to confess.
33	9	"Spring of First Year"; Transliteration: "Ichinensei Haru" (Japanese: 1年生 春)	Motoki Nakanishi	Yasuhiro Nakanishi	June 4, 2022
33	9	"Kaguya's Culture Festival"; Transliteration: "Kaguya-sama no Bunkasai" (Japanese: かぐや様の文化祭)	Motoki Nakanishi	Yasuhiro Nakanishi	June 4, 2022
33	9	"Yu Ishigami's Culture Festival"; Transliteration: "Ishigami Yū no Bunkasai" (Japanese: 石上優の文化祭)	Motoki Nakanishi	Yasuhiro Nakanishi	June 4, 2022
The Hoshin Culture Festival begins and both Kaguya and Miyuki intend to confess to each other. Miyuki reminds himself of his first encounter with her, when she saved someone from drowning. Kaguya works as a poster girl at a café shop at the festival, wearing clothes from the Taisho era; this made the shop very crowded. She continues on as a waitress and could not confess to Miyuki. Yu wants to confess to Tsubame, getting a running start first by asking her out on a horror mansion.
34	10	"Kozue Makihara Wants to Have Fun"; Transliteration: "Makihara Kozue wa Asobitai" (Japanese: 槇原こずえは遊びたい)	Shōtarō Kitamura	Yasuhiro Nakanishi	June 11, 2022
34	10	"Chika Fujiwara Wants to Unmask"; Transliteration: "Fujiwara Chika wa Abakitai" (Japanese: 藤原千花は暴きたい)	Shōtarō Kitamura	Yasuhiro Nakanishi	June 11, 2022
34	10	"Miyuki Shirogane's Culture Festival"; Transliteration: "Shirogane Miyuki no Bunkasai" (Japanese: 白銀御行の文化祭)	Shōtarō Kitamura	Yasuhiro Nakanishi	June 11, 2022
Yu and Tsubame must be separated at the horror mansion due to a prior incident involving Nagisa kissing with her boyfriend in a locker. Chika attempts to ridicule Miyuki by letting him demonstrate his inabilities in front of her sister Moeha, who hopes to confess to him with a heart-shaped keychain. However, he successfully shows off his skills and Chika leaves with him. Yu wins a heart-shaped cookie at a festival game and gifts it to Tsubame, not knowing it means he was publicly confessing to her. She snatched it away from him and runs off.
35	11	"Miyuki Shirogane Wants to Make Her Confess, Part 4"; Transliteration: "Shirogane Miyuki wa Kokurasetai Yon" (Japanese: 白銀御行は告らせたい④)	Ryōta Aikei	Yukie Sugawara	June 18, 2022
35	11	"Tsubame Koyasu Wants to Say No"; Transliteration: "Koyasu Tsubame wa Kotowaritai" (Japanese: 子安つばめは断りたい)	Ryōta Aikei	Yukie Sugawara	June 18, 2022
35	11	"Miyuki Shirogane Wants to Make Her Confess, Part 5"; Transliteration: "Shirogane Miyuki wa Kokurasetai Go" (Japanese: 白銀御行は告らせたい⑤)	Ryōta Aikei	Yukie Sugawara	June 18, 2022
Kaguya asks Miyuki vaguely to twist her a heart-shaped balloon, not knowing its price is another heart-shaped object. She wants to give him the keychain but instead pays with cash and runs off. Tsubame stays away from Yu as she does not know how to reject his confession. She and Kaguya see Yu not allowing Miko to go out with two boys. Tsubame reconsiders and gives him a second chance. Miyuki asks Kaguya out on a date. Tsubame also asks Yu out and thanks Kaguya for her help. At the end of the date, Miyuki reveals his acceptance letter from Stanford, which states he is will be skipping a class and leave next year.
36	12	"Kaguya Wants to Confess, Part 2"; Transliteration: "Kaguya-sama wa Tsugeritai Ni" (Japanese: かぐや様は告りたい②)	Tsuyoshi Tobita	Yasuhiro Nakanishi	June 25, 2022
36	12	"Kaguya Wants to Confess, Part 3"; Transliteration: "Kaguya-sama wa Tsugeritai San" (Japanese: かぐや様は告りたい③)	Tsuyoshi Tobita	Yasuhiro Nakanishi	June 25, 2022
36	12	"Dual Confessions, Part 1"; Transliteration: ""Futatsu no Kokuhaku" Zenpen" (Japanese: 「二つの告白」前編)	Tsuyoshi Tobita	Yasuhiro Nakanishi	June 25, 2022
Ai urges Kaguya to do everything she has longed to do to Miyuki before he leaves, for which she devises a plan that, after lighting up a campfire with a bow and arrow as a part of the festival, Kaguya would confess to him while drinking canned coffee. While they search for Miyuki, Yu learns about the act of giving a heart during the festival, but fails to realize that he confessed. Without success of finding him, Kaguya sets the wood structure on fire but then a phantom thief Arsène mysteriously drops several cryptic messages written on paper on the crowd watching. Chika invites Kaguya to solve the riddle game but Kaguya believes it is just a red herring and goes directly to the spot those papers were dropped.
37	13	"Dual Confessions, Part 2"; Transliteration: ""Futatsu no Kokuhaku" Kōhen" (Japanese: 「二つの告白」後編)	Takayuki Kikuchi	Yasuhiro Nakanishi	June 25, 2022
37	13	"The Shuchiin Afterparty"; Transliteration: "Shuchiin wa Matsuri" (Japanese: 秀知院は後夜祭)	Takayuki Kikuchi	Yasuhiro Nakanishi	June 25, 2022
Kaguya finds Miyuki cosplaying as Arsène on a rooftop and before she can tell him her true feelings, he releases a giant balloon on the campfire, scattering dozens of heart-shaped balloons into the sky. He does not want to confess first and asks her to apply to Stanford with him. She accepts and, as a prize for finding the phantom thief, kisses him.

== Preview special ==
Story	Episode	Title	Directed by	Written by	Original release date
PV	0	"Yu Ishigami Wants to Talk"; Transliteration: "Ishigami Yū wa Kataritai" (Japanese: 石上優は語りたい)	Aya Ikeda	Yasuhiro Nakanishi	October 21, 2021
Yu wants to talk about his favorite manga getting a third anime season, but finds it hard to do so in front of the female members of the student council, as he is a "closet otaku", which greatly frustrates Miyuki.
