= Shinichi Omata =

Japanese film director

Shinichi Omata 小俣 真一
- Born: Japan
- Other name: Mamoru Hatakeyama (畠山守)
- Occupations: Director, storyboard artist, producer
- Years active: 1995–2001, 2009–present
- Employer: Phoenix Entertainment (1995–2001)
- Known for: Descending Stories: Showa Genroku Rakugo Shinju; Kaguya-sama: Love is War

Shinichi Omata (Japanese: 小俣 真一, Hepburn: Omata Shin'ichi) is a Japanese director, storyboard artist, and former producer best known for directing Descending Stories: Showa Genroku Rakugo Shinju (2016) and Kaguya-sama: Love is War (2019).

== Career ==
Omata began his career in the industry in the mid-1990s as a producer at Phoenix Entertainment, which he worked with until 2001. He mainly worked as either an animation producer for hentai series, or as an assistant production manager on series Phoenix Entertainment produced. In 2009, he became an active storyboard artist with Shaft, first serving on the 9th episode of Natsu no Arashi! Akinai-chū. During his tenure with Shaft, he worked mainly under the direction of Akiyuki Shinbo and Yukihiro Miyamoto, with whom he directed and storyboarded several episodes to Arakawa Under the Bridge, Puella Magi Madoka Magica, and Ground Control to Psychoelectric Girl. In 2012, Omata left Shaft's ranks and began working mainly for Studio Deen, where he would make his first series directorial debut with Sankarea: Undying Love under the pseudonym Mamoru Hatakeyama (畠山守, Hatakeyama Mamoru). Shinbo's own style with Shaft is regarded to be a sort of "artistic renaissance" within the anime industry, and Omata's own directorial works after his leave from the studio have also been regarded as such. Descending Stories: Showa Genroku Rakugo Shinju, for example, has been praised for its storytelling and direction despite limited and inconsistent animation from the studio's animation team. Following his work with Studio Deen, Omata began a relationship with A-1 Pictures in 2018, where he directed the fantasy war series Record of Grancrest War, and the following year was given directorial responsibilities for Kaguya-sama: Love is War. The series garnered immediate success and was included as a runner-up for Funimation's "Decade of Anime" fan-poll award for "Favorite Romance Series of the Decade" was nominated at the 2020 Crunchyroll Anime Awards for Best Comedy. The second season garnered seven awards at the 2020 Newtype Anime Awards, including Best Director for Omata.

== Works ==
=== Television series ===
In "Director(s)" column highlights Omata's directorial works.

Year	Title	Director(s)	Studio	SB (Note: Storyboard artist.)	ED (Note: Episode director, equivalent to unit director.)	Other roles and notes	Ref(s)
1998	Princess Nine	Tomomi Mochizuki	Phoenix Entertainment	No	No	Animation producer	
2009	Natsu no Arashi! Akinai-chū (#9)	Akiyuki Shinbo; Kenichi Ishikura (series)	Shaft	Yes	No		
2010	Hidamari Sketch x Hoshimittsu	Akiyuki Shinbo; Kenichi Ishikura (series)	Shaft	Yes	No		
2010	Arakawa Under the Bridge	Yukihiro Miyamoto (series)	Shaft	Yes	Yes		
2010	Arakawa Under the Bridge x Bridge	Akiyuki Shinbo; Yukihiro Miyamoto (series)	Shaft	Yes	Yes		
2011	Puella Magi Madoka Magica	Akiyuki Shinbo; Yukihiro Miyamoto (series)	Shaft	Yes	Yes		
2011	Lotte no Omocha!	Fumitoshi Oizaki	Diomedéa	Yes	No		
2011	Ground Control to Psychoelectric Girl	Akiyuki Shinbo (chief); Yukihiro Miyamoto (series)	Shaft	Yes	Yes	Key animator	
2011	Phi Brain: Puzzle of God	Junichi Sato	Sunrise	No	Yes		
2011	The World's Greatest First Love	Chiaki Kon	Studio Deen	No	Yes		
2012	Hidamari Sketch x Honeycomb	Akiyuki Shinbo; Yuki Yase (series)	Shaft	Yes	No		
2012	Sankarea: Undying Love	Mamoru Hatakeyama	Studio Deen	Yes	Yes	Opening director and storyboard Ending director and storyboard As Mamoru Hatakeyama	
2013	Rozen Maiden: Zurückspulen	Mamoru Hatakeyama	Studio Deen	Yes	Yes		
2013	Hakkenden: Eight Dogs of the East	Osamu Yamasaki (chief); Mitsue Yamazaki	Studio Deen	Yes	No	As Mamoru Hatakeyama	
2013	Hakkenden: Eight Dogs of the East 2	Osamu Yamasaki (chief); Mitsue Yamazaki	Studio Deen	Yes	No		
2013	Da Capo III	Kenichi Ishikura	Actas	Yes	No		
2014	Sakura Trick	Kenichi Ishikura	Studio Deen	Yes	No		
2014	Wake Up, Girls!	Yutaka Yamamoto	Ordet; Tatsunoko Production	Yes	No		
2014	Dramatical Murder	Kazuya Miura	NAZ	Yes	No		
2014	Black Butler: Book of Circus	Noriyuki Abe	A-1 Pictures	Yes	No	Ending director and storyboard	
2016	The Asterisk War	Kenji Seto	A-1 Pictures	Yes	No		
2016	Descending Stories: Showa Genroku Rakugo Shinju	Mamoru Hatakeyama	Studio Deen	Yes	No	As Mamoru Hatakeyama	
2017	Hell Girl: The Fourth Twilight	Takahiro Omori	Studio Deen	Yes	No	As Mamoru Hatakeyama	
2017	Descending Stories: Showa Genroku Rakugo Shinju 2nd Season	Mamoru Hatakeyama	Studio Deen	Yes	Yes	As Mamoru Hatakeyama	
2018	Record of Grancrest War	Mamoru Hatakeyama	A-1 Pictures	Yes	Yes	Opening storyboard Ending storyboard As Mamoru Hatakeyama	
2019	Teasing Master Takagi-san 2	Hiroaki Akagi	Shin-Ei Animation	Yes	No		
2019	Kaguya-sama: Love Is War	Mamoru Hatakeyama	A-1 Pictures	Yes	Yes	As Mamoru Hatakeyama	
2020	I've Been Killing Slimes for 300 Years and Maxed Out My Level	Nobukage Kimura	Revoroot	Yes	No		
2020	Kaguya-sama: Love Is War?	Mamoru Hatakeyama	A-1 Pictures	Yes	No	As Mamoru Hatakeyama	
2021	Visual Prison	Takeshi Furuta (chief); Tomoya Tanaka	A-1 Pictures	Yes	No		
2022	Kaguya-sama: Love Is War – Ultra Romantic	Mamoru Hatakeyama	A-1 Pictures	Yes	Yes	As Mamoru Hatakeyama	
2023	Undead Girl Murder Farce	Mamoru Hatakeyama	Lapin Track	Yes	No	As Mamoru Hatakeyama	
2026	Go for It, Nakamura!	Aoi Umeki	Drive	Yes	No		

=== OVAs/ONAs ===
Year	Title	Director(s)	Studio	SB	ED	Other roles and notes	Ref(s)
1995	Giant Robo Gaiden Ginrei (#3)	Takeshi Mori	Phoenix Entertainment	No	No	Production assistant	
1996	Shin Kaitei Gunkan	Mitsuo Fukuda	Phoenix Entertainment	No	No	Production assistant	
1998	Giant Robo: The Day the Earth Stood Still (#7)	Yasuhiro Imagawa	Phoenix Entertainment	No	No	Production manager	
1999	Mechiku	Mitsuhiro Yoneda	Phoenix Entertainment	No	No	Production manager	
1999	Ikenie	Teruaki Murakami	Phoenix Entertainment	No	No	Animation producer	
1999	Kiss Yori...	Rion Kujou	Phoenix Entertainment	No	No	Animation producer	
1999	MeiKing	Teruaki Murakami; Sougetsu Mimura	Phoenix Entertainment	No	No	Animation producer	
1999	Shimai Ijiri	Mitsuhiro Yoneda	Phoenix Entertainment	No	No	Animation producer	
2000	Ai Doll (#3–4)	Rion Kujou	Phoenix Entertainment	No	No	Animation producer	
2000	Bondage Mansion	Norihiko Nagahama	Phoenix Entertainment	No	No	Animation producer	
2000	Endless Serenade	Teruaki Muruakami	Phoenix Entertainment	No	No	Animation producer	
2000	JoJo's Bizarre Adventure (#3–5)	Various	A.P.P.P.	No	No	Production desk	
2000	Tonari no Onee-san	Teruaki Murakami; Sougetsu Mimura	Phoenix Entertainment	No	No	Animation producer	
2000	Dark	Norihiko Nagahama	Phoenix Entertainment	No	No	Animation producer	
2000	Campus	Haruo Oogawara; Yoshiki Ozu	Phoenix Entertainment	No	No	Animation producer	
2001	Holy Virgins	Kansaburou Oda	Phoenix Entertainment	No	No	Animation producer	
2001	Private Sessions	Yuuji Yanase	Phoenix Entertainment	No	No	Animation producer	
2001	Punishment	Teruaki Murakami; Mitsuhiro Yoneda	Phoenix Entertainment	No	No	Animation producer	
2001	Sex Ward	Kuboyama 1862	Phoenix Entertainment	No	No	Animation producer	
2001	Slaves to Passion (#1)	Kansaburou Oda	Phoenix Entertainment	No	No	Animation producer	
2011	Starry Sky	Kiyoko Sayama	Studio Deen	No	Yes		
2012	Sankarea: Undying Love	Mamoru Hatakeyama	Studio Deen	Yes	Yes	Opening director and storyboard Ending director and storyboard As Mamoru Hatakeyama	
2013	Hetalia: The Beautiful World	Hiroshi Watanabe	Studio Deen	Yes	No		
2015	Showa Genroku Rakugo Shinju: Yotaro Hourou-hen	Mamoru Hatakeyama	Studio Deen	Yes	No	As Mamoru Hatakeyama	
2021	Kaguya-sama: Love Is War	Mamoru Hatakeyama	A-1 Pictures	Yes	No	As Mamoru Hatakeyama	
2022	Onna no Sono no Hoshi	Mamoru Hatakeyama	Lapin Track	No	No	As Mamoru Hatakeyama	

=== Films ===
Year	Title	Director(s)	Studio	SB	ED	Other roles and notes	Ref(s)
2011	Mahou Sensei Negima! Anime Finale	Akiyuki Shinbo	Shaft; Studio Pastoral	Yes	No		
2012	Puella Magi Madoka Magica the Movie: Beginnings	Akiyuki Shinbo (chief); Yukihiro Miyamoto	Shaft	Yes	No		
2017	Black Butler: Book of the Atlantic	Noriyuki Abe	A-1 Pictures	Yes	No		
2022	Kaguya-sama: Love Is War – The First Kiss That Never Ends	Mamoru Hatakeyama	A-1 Pictures	Yes	No	As Mamoru Hatakeyama	
