= Tochigi Television =

JOGY-DTV
- Logo used since 2015

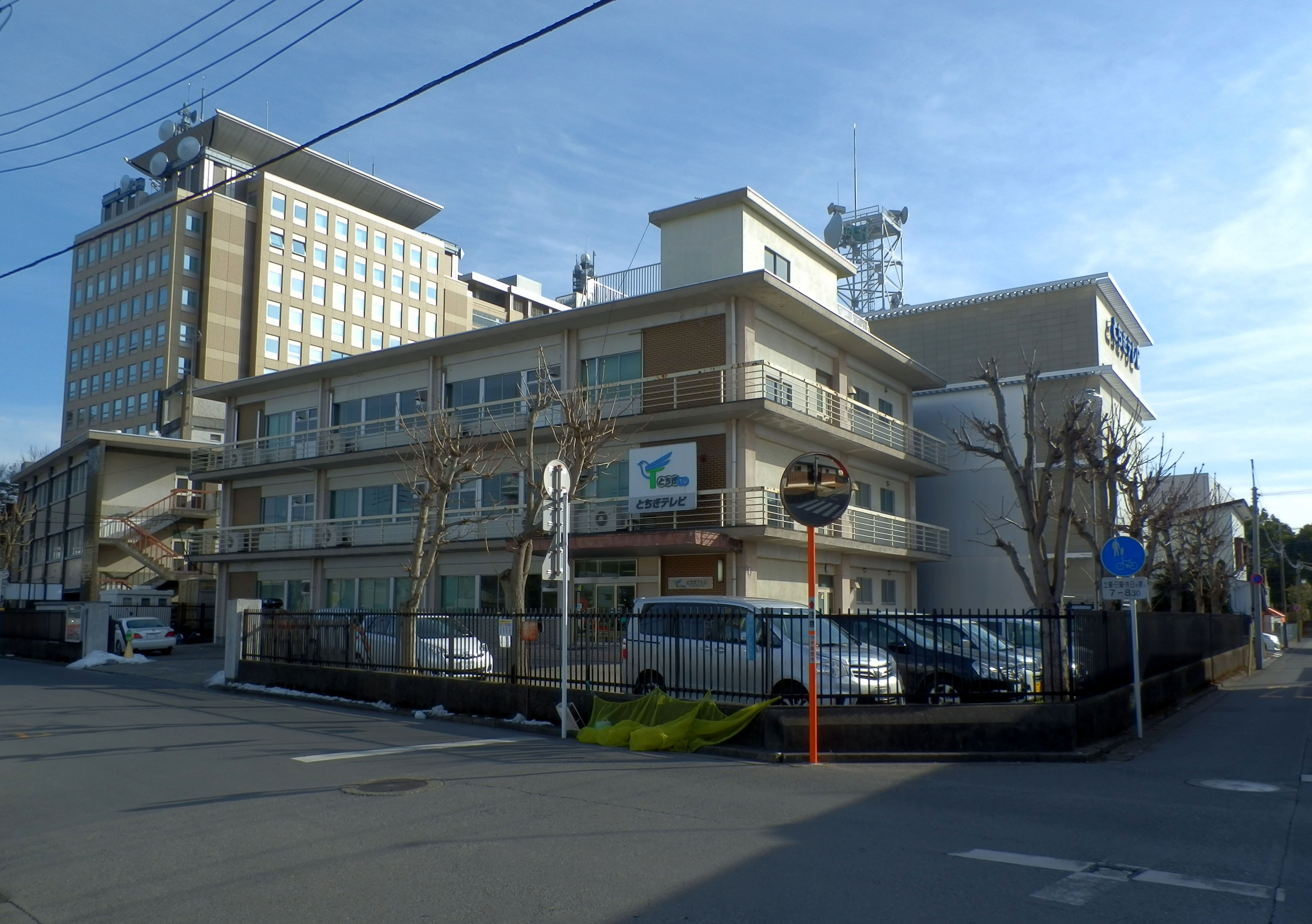
- Headquarters in Showa, Utsunomiya
- Tochigi Prefecture; Japan
- City: Utsunomiya
- Channels: Digital: 29 (UHF); Virtual: 3
- Branding: Tochigi Television; Tochi Tele; GYT

Programming
- Language: Japanese
- Affiliations: Independent (member of JAITS)

Ownership
- Owner: Tochigi Television Co., Ltd.

History
- Founded: May 14, 1997
- First air date: April 1, 1999
- Former call signs: JOGY-TV (1999-2011)
- Former channel numbers: 31 (analog UHF, 1999-2011)

Technical information
- Licensing authority: MIC

Links
- Website: www.tochigi-tv.jp

Tochigi Television (とちぎテレビ, Tochigi Terebi), also known as GYT and branded on air as Tochi Tele (とちテレ, Tochi Tere), is a television network headquartered in Tochigi Prefecture, Japan. It is a member of the Japanese Association of Independent Television Stations (JAITS). The government of Tochigi prefecture hold half stock share of GYT.

Tochigi Television is the last analog terrestrial TV station in Japan; it started broadcasting on April 1, 1999. Tochigi TV started digital terrestrial television broadcasting on December 1, 2005.
