= Television Niigata Network =

JOPI-DTV
- Logo used since 2013

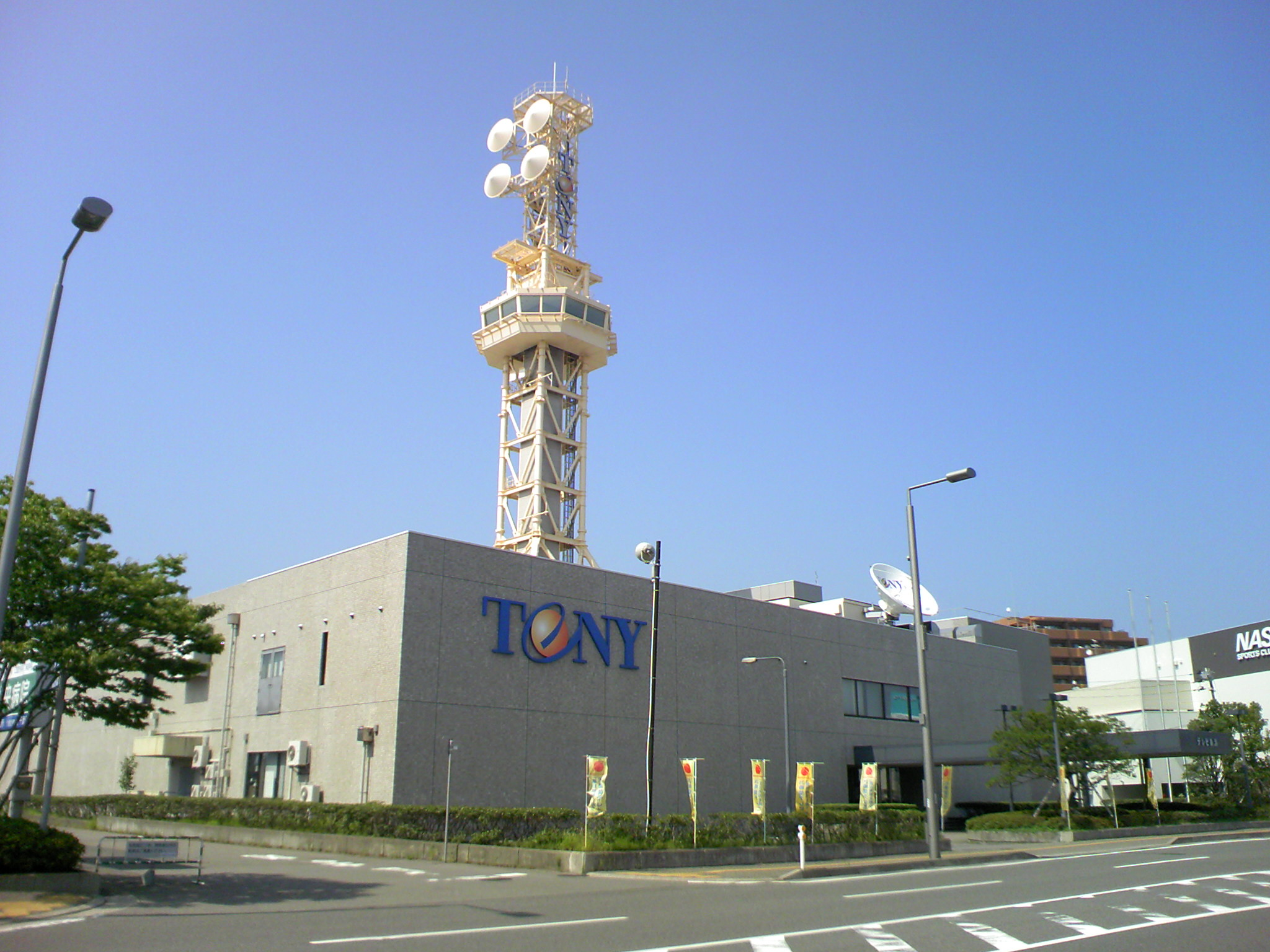
- Headquarters in Chuo-ku, Niigata
- Niigata Prefecture; Japan
- City: Niigata City
- Channels: Digital: 26 (UHF); Virtual: 4
- Branding: Television Niigata; TeNY

Programming
- Language: Japanese
- Affiliations: Nippon News Network and Nippon Television Network System

Ownership
- Owner: Television Niigata Network Co., Ltd.

History
- First air date: April 1, 1981
- Former call signs: JOPI-TV (1981-2011)
- Former channel numbers: Analog: 29 (UHF, 1981–2011)

Technical information
- Licensing authority: MIC

Links
- Website: www.teny.co.jp

Corporate information
- Native name: 株式会社テレビ新潟放送網
- Romanized name: Kabushikigaisha Terebi Niigata Hōsōmō
- Type: Kabushiki gaisha
- Industry: Television network
- Founded: October 23, 1980; 46 years ago
- Headquarters: 1-11 Shinkocho,, Chuo-ku, Niigata City, Niigata Prefecture, Japan
- Key people: Genichiro Shoriki (President and CEO)
- Footnotes; Data from its Company Profile

Television Niigata Network Co., Ltd. (株式会社テレビ新潟放送網, Kabushikigaisha Terebi Niigata Hōsōmō; TeNY) is a TV station affiliated with Nippon News Network (NNN) and Nippon Television Network System (NNS) in Niigata, Niigata. It is broadcast in Niigata Prefecture. It was established on October 23, 1980 and began broadcasting from April 1, 1981. The station had been used the abbreviation TNN until 1998.
