= List of Oshi no Ko characters =

Characters from the series, including (from left to right, starting from the bottom) Melt Narushima, Mem-cho, Kana Arima, Akane Kurokawa, Ruby Hoshino, Taiki Himekawa (standing), Ai Hoshino (on TV), and Aquamarine "Aqua" Hoshino

The Japanese manga series Oshi no Ko features an extensive cast of characters created by Aka Akasaka and Mengo Yokoyari. The story follows a doctor and his recently deceased patient, reborn as twins to a famous Japanese musical idol, navigating the highs and lows of the Japanese entertainment industry as they grow up together through their lives.

== Main characters ==
=== Ai Hoshino ===
Voiced by: Rie Takahashi (Japanese); Donna Bella Litton (English)
Portrayed by: Asuka Saitō

Ai Hoshino (星野 アイ, Hoshino Ai) is a selfless, empathetic but altruisticly deceptive pop idol who rose from humble beginnings. Raised in an orphanage after her parents' absence, she is scouted at age 12 by Strawberry Productions president Ichigo Saitō. Initially doubting she could be an idol due to her inability to understand love, she learns to perform affection for fans, eventually becoming the centerpiece of B-Komachi. At 16, she secretly carries twins, Aquamarine and Ruby, pausing her career to start a family. Returning to idol work after their birth, she is murdered at 20 by an obsessed fan. In her final moments, she realizes her genuine love for her children. Her death drives Aqua to pursue acting as part of his quest for vengeance. Her name, meaning "starry eye", (Note: 星のアイ, Hoshi no Ai) references the distinctive six-pointed stars in her and her children's eyes.

=== Aquamarine Hoshino / Aqua ===
Voiced by: Takeo Ōtsuka (Aqua, teen), Yumi Uchiyama (Aqua, child), Kent Itō (Gorou) (Japanese); Jack Stansbury (Aqua, teen), Chaney Moore (Aqua, child), Jeremy Gee (Gorou) (English)
Portrayed by: Kaito Sakurai (Aqua), Haru Iwakawa (Aqua, child), Ryo Narita (Gorou), Rio Komiya (Aqua, 2.5 D Stage Play)

Aquamarine Hoshino (星野 愛久愛海, Hoshino Akuamarin), known as Aqua (アクア, Akua), was originally Gorou Amamiya (雨宮 吾郎, Amamiya Gorō), an obstetrician-gynecologist and devoted fan of Ai Hoshino. Before delivering Ai's twins, Gorou is murdered by her stalker and another doctor had to take over the delivery. However, Gorou reincarnated as her son, Aqua. Following Ai's death, Aqua vows to uncover the truth, theorizing his biological father—someone in the entertainment industry—betrayed her location. He pursues acting to infiltrate the industry and exact revenge. Though he briefly dates Akane, he ends their relationship upon realizing the danger his mission poses for her. Despite growing self-awareness about his destructive obsession, Aqua ultimately stages a murder-suicide with his father, ensuring Ruby's safety before his death. In his final moments, he finds peace, envisioning a hopeful future for Ruby as his consciousness fades.

=== Ruby Hoshino ===
Voiced by: Yurie Igoma (Ruby), Tomoyo Takayanagi (Sarina) (Japanese); Alyssa Marek (Ruby), Savanna Menzel (Sarina) (English)
Portrayed by: Nagisa Saitō (Ruby), Yuna Saitō (Ruby, child), Kurumi Inagaki (Sarina)

Ruby Hoshino (星野 瑠美衣, Hoshino Rubii), originally Sarina Tendōji (天童寺 さりな, Tendōji Sarina), was a terminally ill patient who idolized Gorou before reincarnating as Ai Hoshino's daughter. Carrying Sarina's dream of becoming an idol, Ruby trains diligently after Ai's murder. Though initially rejected due to Aqua's interference, she forms the new B-Komachi with Kana and Mem-cho. Ruby retains Sarina's unrequited love for Gorou, complicating her relationship with Aqua upon discovering his true identity. After overcoming the trauma of Aqua's death, she emerges as an inspirational idol. The ending of the story suggests that despite her initial resistance, Ruby eventually accepted her mother's philosophy, inspiring people with a fake happy and serene persona while hiding sadness and heavy feelings in her heart.

=== Kana Arima ===
Voiced by: Megumi Han (Japanese); Natalie Rial (English)
Portrayed by: Nanoka Hara, Yuzuna Kato (child), Momoka Satake (2.5 D Stage Play)

Kana Arima (有馬 かな, Arima Kana), once hailed as a child acting prodigy for her ability to cry on command, first meets Aqua when he fills in as a movie extra. As a teenager, her career declines as her talent overshadows peers, forcing her to restrain her performances. Reuniting with Aqua and Ruby in high school, she develops unrequited feelings for Aqua and later joins Ruby's idol group, B-Komachi, becoming its standout member. After two years, she departs to revive her acting career. Her rivalry with Akane stems from their contentious past, where Akane once idolized her. Though Aqua internally acknowledges Kana as the girl closest to him besides Ruby, he never confesses his feelings before his death, leaving Kana tormented by her own unspoken love.

Kana is one of the two protagonists of the light novel spin-off dedicated to her and Akane, which ends with her becoming a famous Japanese and Hollywood actress who tries to fill the void in her heart after Aqua's death with her constant development of her acting career.

=== Akane Kurokawa ===
Voiced by: Manaka Iwami (Japanese); Kristen McGuire (English)
Portrayed by: Mizuki Kayashima, Mirai Uchida (2.5 D Stage Play)

Akane Kurokawa (黒川 あかね, Kurokawa Akane) is a stage actress who joins the reality show My Love with a Star Begins Now (LoveNow) to promote her theater troupe. Initially overlooked, she faces severe online harassment after accidentally scratching a co-star, driving her to a suicide attempt that Aqua prevents. By the show's end, her reputation improves, and she shares a staged relationship with Aqua, though she later develops genuine feelings for him. Her admiration for Kana turns to rivalry after a bitter confrontation. A meticulous performer, Akane employs a method-acting approach, deeply analyzing her roles. Discovering Aqua's quest for vengeance, she supports him until he ends their relationship for her safety. Later, she intervenes in his revenge plot, disguising herself as Ruby to thwart an assassination attempt while ensuring Ruby's escape.

Akane is one of the two protagonists of the light novel spin-off dedicated to her and Kana, which ends with her meeting Crow Girl and, fully immersed in the study of the occult, trying to find a way to bring Aqua back to life despite warnings about the dangers of this from her.

=== Mem-cho ===
Voiced by: Rumi Okubo (Japanese); Juliet Simmons (English)
Portrayed by: Ano

Mem-cho (MEMちょ) is a YouTuber and TikToker who signs up for LoveNow who is revealed to be aged 25 despite her appearance resembling a high school student. She pursued her dream of becoming an idol, but was unsuccessful due to her family situation during her high school days. She decided to become a streamer and lied about her age to gain many followers. After LoveNow, Aqua recruits her to B-Komachi. She was reluctant due to her age, but ultimately decides to join.

== Ichigo Productions ==
=== Ichigo Saitō ===
Voiced by: Hisao Egawa (Japanese); Brandon Hearnsberger (English)
Portrayed by: Kōtarō Yoshida

Ichigo Saitō (斎藤 壱護, Saitō Ichigo) is the president of Strawberry Productions. He is the husband of Miyako Saitō. Ichigo was responsible for the recruitment of Ai Hoshino to B-Komachi. He acts as the caretaker for Aqua and Ruby after Ai's death. Soon after Ai's death, he disappeared for a decade until Ruby tracked him down in order to get advice on her own plans for revenge on her mother's killer. Soon after, he was tracked down by Aqua as well, and expressing a fellow desire for revenge on the killer, assists Aqua with his plans.

=== Miyako Saitō ===
Voiced by: Lynn (Japanese); Christina Kelly (English)
Portrayed by: Kana Kurashina

Miyako Saitō (斎藤 ミヤコ, Saitō Miyako) is the wife of Ichigo Saitō and acts as the primary caretaker for Aqua and Ruby after Ai's death. She manages Strawberry Productions and keeps the business afloat after the disbandment of the original B-Komachi and the disappearance of Ichigo.

=== Pieyon ===
Voiced by: Taishi Murata (Japanese); Andrew Love (English)

Pieyon (ぴえヨン) is an anonymous famous physical training YouTuber affiliated with Strawberry Productions, who coaches choreography for B-Komachi members. He makes over 100 million yen a year.

== Entertainment industry ==
=== Stars/performers ===
==== Melt Narushima ====
Voiced by: Seiji Maeda (Japanese); Bryson Baugus (English)
Portrayed by: Hideyoshi Kan, Naotake Tsuchiya (2.5 D Stage Play)

Melt Narushima (鳴嶋 メルト, Narushima Meruto) is an actor and model affiliated with Sonic Stage Productions. He was an arrogant and untrained actor when playing the male lead in the Sweet Today live-action adaptation, but still managed to deliver a solid performance for the final scene after being provoked by Aquamarine Hoshino. The experience humbled him and he has worked on improving his acting skills by the time he joined the stage production of Tokyo Blade. He later is expected to play Gorou Amamiya on Director Gotanda's and Aqua's planned Ai biographical movie.

==== Frill Shiranui ====
Voiced by: Asami Seto (Japanese); Annie Wild (English)

Frill Shiranui (不知火 フリル, Shiranui Furiru) is a student of Youtou High School's Performing Arts Program and one of Ruby's classmates. She is an aloof, attentive and deadpan multi-talented performer who can sing, dance, and act. She later is expected to play Airi Himekawa in Director Gotanda's and Aqua's planned Ai biographical movie after originally being chosen for the role of Ai before allowing Ruby to play the role following a self audition where she was impressed by Ruby's acting skill and conviction.

==== Minami Kotobuki ====
Voiced by: Hina Yōmiya (Japanese); Brittany Lauda (English)

Minami Kotobuki (寿 みなみ, Kotobuki Minami) is a student in the Performing Arts Program of Youtou High School and a classmate of Ruby and Frill. In the show business industry, she is a friendly but pragmatic and resilient individual who works as a gravure model.

==== Yuki Sumi ====
Voiced by: Saori Ōnishi (Japanese); Olivia Swasey (English)
Portrayed by: Naenano

Yuki Sumi (鷲見 ゆき, Sumi Yuki) is a fashion model and a participant in the reality dating show The Beginning of My Love With An Idol or LoveNow. Initially a strategic but mature and loyal individual who imagined she would fade into the background, she used her character to create drama and interest.

==== Nobuyuki Kumano ====
Voiced by: Tomohiro Ohno (Japanese); Scott Gibbs (English)
Portrayed by: Tōtarō

Nobuyuki Kumano (熊野 ノブユキ, Kumano Nobuyuki) is a high school second-year dancer and media personality who gained recognition on the reality dating show LoveforReal (also known as The Beginning of My Love With An Idol). Depicted as an honest, empathetic and hardworking individual, he forms a relationship with fellow participant Yuki Sumi at the conclusion of the season.

==== Kengo Morimoto ====
Voiced by: Taito Ban (Japanese); Adam Gibbs (English)
Portrayed by: Hiromu Kuroda

Kengo Morimoto (森本 ケンゴ, Morimoto Kengo) is a high school third-year bandsman and musician. He is a quiet, cooperative and supportive individual who participated in the reality dating show We're About to Fall in Love for Real (also known as LoveforReal or LoveNow). Acting as a mature, steady presence, he initially used his participation on the show as a strategic opportunity to gain mainstream exposure for his music career.

==== Taiki Himekawa ====
Voiced by: Koki Uchiyama (Japanese); Daman Mills (English)
Portrayed by: Co-ki Yamashita

Taiki Himekawa (姫川 大輝, Himekawa Taiki) is an award-winning stage actor affiliated with the Lalalai Theatrical Company, first seen as the main star of the Tokyo Blade stage production. It is later revealed that he is also Aqua and Ruby's older half-brother, conceived when his mother, an actress, Airi Himekawa cheated on his legal father with their biological father, Hikaru Kamiki; the latter was eleven years old at that time and an aspiring child actor joining the Lala Lai Theatrical Company when he was molested by Airi resulting in Taiki's birth. However, he himself remains unaware that he is the product of an affair.

==== Sakuya Kamoshida ====
Voiced by: Yūsuke Kobayashi (Japanese); Josh Swasey (English)
Portrayed by: Ryō Kitamura (2.5 D Stage Play)

Sakuya Kamoshida (鴨志田 朔夜, Kamoshida Sakuya) is a 22-year-old professional stage actor who is well known within the industry for his extensive experience in 2.5D theatre productions. Though highly talented and dedicated on stage, Sakuya possesses an arrogant, flirtatious personality and a reputation as a womanizer. He initially openly looks down on Melt Narushima's amateur acting abilities. However, after Melt delivers a powerful, breakout performance during the live show, Sakuya gains a newfound professional respect for him and officially acknowledges him as a peer.

=== Production ===
==== Taishi Gotanda ====
Voiced by: Yasuyuki Kase (Japanese); Ty Mahany (English)
Portrayed by: Nobuaki Kaneko

Taishi Gotanda (五反田 泰志, Gotanda Taishi) is the film director who scouted Aqua and convinced him to become an actor when he saw his potential. After Ai's death, he recruited Aqua as his student at Aqua's request. He is one of the few people who knows the real identity of Aqua. He was once recruited by Ai to make a documentary film of her prior to her death. The creation of this biographical film of Ai's life is part of Aqua's plan of revenge against his father and Ai's killer.

==== Masaya Kaburagi ====
Voiced by: Masaki Terasoma (Japanese); Justin Doran (English)
Portrayed by: Jun Kaname

Masaya Kaburagi (鏑木 勝也, Kaburagi Masaya) is a producer affiliated with an internet TV Station Dot TV!, and producer of the Sweet Today live-action adaptation and the webshow Dig Deep! One Chance. He seems to have deep ties with Ai at the past.

==== Toshirou Kindaichi ====
Voiced by: Tomoyuki Shimura (Japanese); Luis Galindo (English)
Portrayed by: Toshinori Omi

Masaya Kaburagi (鏑木 勝也, Kaburagi Masaya) is a sharp and capable director who helped found the Lala Lai Theatrical Company. Kindaichi is known for his ability to bring out the absolute best in his actors, often using clever strategies—such as bringing in outside talent—to push his crew to compete and grow. Following a family tragedy, he also stepped up to raise the talented young actor Taiki Himekawa as his adoptive son.

==== Yoriko Kichijouji ====
Voiced by: Shizuka Itō (Japanese); Kelly Greenshield (English)
Portrayed by: Yumi Adachi, Mahiro Hiratai (2.5 D Stage Play)

Yoriko Kichijouji (吉祥寺 頼子, Kichijōji Yoriko) is the manga artist behind the popular manga series I'll Go With Sweet Today and Abiko's mentor. She also serves as producer for its live action drama where Kana is starring.

==== Abiko Samejima ====
Voiced by: Ayane Sakura (Japanese); Jad Saxton (English)
Portrayed by: Mirai Shida, Marina Taue (2.5 D Stage Play)

Abiko Samejima (鮫島 アビ子, Samejima Abiko) is the manga artist behind the manga series Tokyo Blade, and became a producer for its stage play after expressing displeasure with how its adaptation and script was progressing. She used to be Yoriko's assistant and student.

==== GOA ====
Voiced by: Daisuke Ono (Japanese); Dylan Godwin (English)
Portrayed by: Junki Tozuka, Ryōma Baba (2.5 D Stage Play)

The sole screenwriter responsible for adapting the manga series Tokyo Blade into a 2.5D Stage Play, before he worked with the author of Tokyo Blade, Abiko Samejima, and created a new screenplay for the adaptation.

==== Sumiaki Raida ====
Voiced by: Kenichi Suzumura (Japanese); Alejandro Saab (English)
Portrayed by: Aoi Nakamura, Kōsuke Kujirai (2.5 D Stage Play)

A representative of Magic Floor, an event management company. He is also the lead producer for the 2.5D Stage Play adaptation of Tokyo Blade.

== Others ==
=== Hikaru Kamiki ===
Voiced by: Mamoru Miyano (Japanese); Austin Tindle (English)
Portrayed by: Kazunari Ninomiya, Sōya Kurokawa (young)

Hikaru Kamiki (神木 輝, Kamiki Hikaru), the biological father of Aqua and Ruby, orchestrates Ai and Gorou's murders. Traumatized after being raped by an actress at age eleven—resulting in his first child—he later meets Ai at fifteen while teaching at Lalalie Theatrical Company. Their short-lived relationship ends when Ai cuts ties, fueling his belief she exploited him. Consumed by vengeance, he manipulates Ryosuke and Nino, Ai's fellow idol member in B-Komachi to destroy Ai's life, though her murder exceeds his initial intent. A pathological liar, Hikaru eliminates rising stars to preserve Ai's legacy, committing multiple murders over 18 years. Exposed by Akane and Aqua through The 15 Year Lie documentary, he feigns remorse before attempting to have Ruby killed by Nino's hands. Ultimately, Aqua anticipates it and prevents it with the help from Akane then forces a fatal confrontation, dragging Hikaru off a cliff in a murder-suicide that ends his reign of violence.

=== Fuyuko Niino ===
Voiced by: Kana Hanazawa

Fuyuko Niino (新野 冬子, Niino Fuyuko) is a former idol who was one of the founding members of the original B-Komachi pop group alongside the legendary star Ai Hoshino. Driven by deep-seated professional jealousy during her youth, she struggled with being outshined by Ai. Following Ai's tragic death, Fuyuko's regrets twisted into a dangerous, unstable obsession with protecting Ai's legacy, leading her to become a secret accomplice to crimes targeting any rising stars she believed might surpass her former bandmate.

=== Tsukuyomi ===
Voiced by: Hina Kino (Japanese); Luci Christian (English)

Tsukuyomi (real name unknown) is mysterious girl in the woods who is a seemingly supernatural being aware of everything that transpires within the story, including Aqua and Ruby's reincarnation. She was originally a wounded crow who was rescued and cared for by Gorou and Sarina until it died. At Aqua's request, she manifests in the real world to portray the infant twins in The 15 Year Lie.

=== Ryosuke Sugano ===
Voiced by: Atsushi Tamaru (Japanese); Gabriel Regojo (English)
Portrayed by: Kazuto Mokudai

Ryosuke Sugano (菅野 良介, Sugano Ryosuke), initially introduced as Ryosuke Kaihara (貝原 良介, Kaihara Ryosuke), is a mentally unstable shut-in and recluse obsessed with Ai and Hikaru. After learning from Hikaru that Ai is pregnant, he tracks her down and murders Gorou by luring him to a cliff near the hospital where Ai gives birth, pushing him to his death. Four years later, Hikaru manipulates Ryosuke into attacking Ai by giving him Ai's home address. Disguised as a fan, he stabs her with a concealed knife inside the bouquet of flowers he brought with him in front of her twins. Overwhelmed when Ai recalls his name, he flees and is later killed by Hikaru, who stages his death as a suicide.
