= Sōya Kurokawa =

Japanese actor (born 2009)

- 黒川 想矢
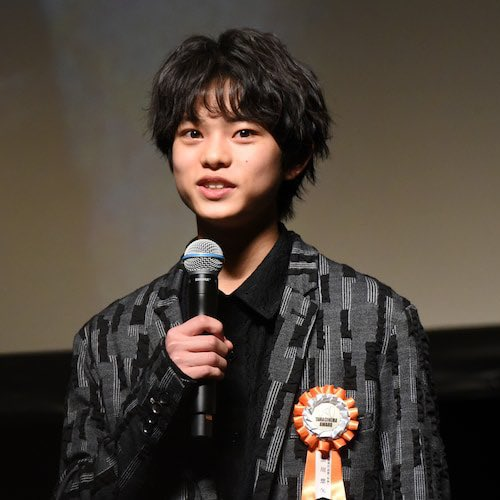
- Kurokawa in 2023
- Born: Sōya Kurokawa; December 5, 2009 (age 16); Saitama Prefecture, Japan
- Occupation: Actor
- Years active: 2015–present
- Known for: Monster as Minato Mugino; Teasing Master Takagi-san as Nishikata

Sōya Kurokawa (黒川 想矢, Kurokawa Sōya; born December 5, 2009) is a Japanese actor. He is best known for his role as Minato Mugino in the 2023 film directed by Hirokazu Kore-eda, Monster, for which he won the Blue Ribbon Award for Best Newcomer.

== Biography ==
Kurokawa was born on December 5, 2009, in Saitama Prefecture to a Japanese mother and Thai father. He began his career when he was five years old. While starring in the NHK period drama Kenjushō: Mitsukuni-kō to Ore, he met actor Hiroshi Tachi, and joined his agency Tachi Pro to continue working with him.

== Filmography ==
=== Film ===
| Year | Title | Role | Notes | Ref. |
|---|---|---|---|---|
| 2023 | Monster | Minato Mugino | Lead role | |
| 2024 | Bishu: The World's Kindest Clothes | Mitsuru Omura | | |
| 2024 | Oshi no Ko: The Final Act | Hikaru Kamiki (young) | | |
| 2025 | Kokuho | Kikuo Tachibana (young) | | |
| 2025 | Catching the Stars of This Summer | Mahiro Ando | | |
| 2025 | After the Quake | Zen'ya (young) | | |
| 2026 | Goodbye My Car | Ryo Kinomiya | | |
| 2026 | Three Millimeters to You | Tatsuhiko | Lead role; South Korean-Japanese film | |

=== Television ===
| Year | Title | Role | Notes | Ref. |
|---|---|---|---|---|
| 2018 | Tokyo Alien Bros. | Ryota | Episodes 3–5 | |
| 2019 | Emergency Interrogation Room | Shosuke (childhood) | Season 3; episode 4 | |
| 2024 | Teasing Master Takagi-san | Nishikata | Lead role | |
| 2024 | Oshi no Ko | Hikaru Kamiki (young) | | |
| 2025 | After the Quake | Zen'ya (young) | Episode 3; miniseries | |

=== Japanese dub ===
| Year | Title | Role | Notes | Ref. |
|---|---|---|---|---|
| 2024 | Migration | Dax Mallard | | |
| 2026 | Arco | Arco Dorell | | |

=== Music video appearances ===
| Year | Title | Artist | Ref. |
|---|---|---|---|
| 2024 | "Omurice" | ReoNa | |
| 2024 | "Ctrl Z" | ChroNoiR | |
| 2025 | "Pained" | Vaundy | |
| 2025 | "Manazashi wa Hikari" | Tatsuya Kitani | |

== Awards and nominations ==
| Year | Award | Category | Nominated work | Result | Ref. |
|---|---|---|---|---|---|
| 2024 | 66th Blue Ribbon Awards | Best Newcomer | Monster | Won | |
| 2024 | 47th Japan Academy Film Prize | Newcomer of the Year | Monster | Won | |
| 2024 | 19th Osaka Film Festival | Newcomer Award | Monster | Won | |
| 2024 | Yumoa Grand Prize | —N/a | Himself | Won | |
| 2025 | 17th Tama Film Awards | Best New Actor Award | Kokuho and Catching The Stars of This Summer | Won | |
| 2025 | 38th Nikkan Sports Film Awards | Best Newcomer | Kokuho and Catching The Stars of This Summer | Nominated | |
| 2025 | 38th Nikkan Sports Film Awards | Yūjirō Ishihara Newcomer Award | Kokuho and Catching The Stars of This Summer | Won | |
| 2026 | 80th Mainichi Film Awards | Best Newcomer | Kokuho | Nominated | |
