= Naenano =

Japanese influencer (born 2001)

- なえなの
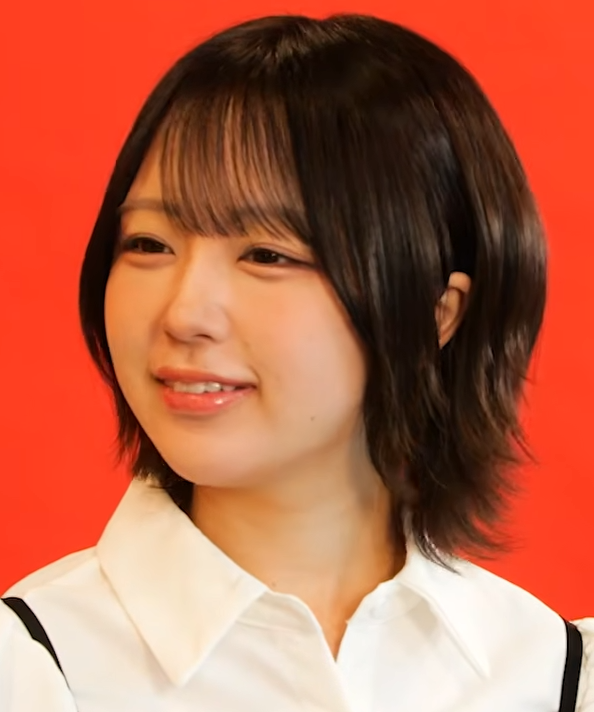
- Naenano for BuzzFeed Japan in 2026
- Born: Nae Furuta; January 14, 2001 (age 25); Susono, Shizuoka, Japan
- Occupations: Influencer; model; singer; actress
- Years active: 2019–present
- Employer: Seju
- Notable work: Koi to Ōkami ni wa Damasarenai; Harem Marriage as Urara Matsuhashi; Oshi no Ko as Yuki Sumi
- Musical career
- Genre: J-pop
- Instrument: Voice
- Label: Space Shower Music

Nae Furuta (古田 菜衣, Furuta Nae; born January 14, 2001), known professionally as Naenano (なえなの), is a Japanese influencer, model, singer, and actress, affiliated with Seju. A native of Gotemba, Shizuoka, she became popular on social media as an influencer, amassing millions of followers as well as a few awards. In addition to modeling work, she has starred in the dramas Harem Marriage and Oshi no Ko, and she appeared in the reality show Koi to Ōkami ni wa Damasarenai – where she sang the opening theme "Uanonosora" (2023) – and hosted the variety show Bukatsu Pīpō Zenryoku Ōen! Bukapi!.

== Biography ==
Naenano was born on January 14, 2001, in Susono, Shizuoka Prefecture. A resident of Gotemba, Shizuoka, for 16 years, she graduated from Gotemba High School in July 2019. She originally worked as an apparel store clerk, but decided to quit in order to become an influencer.

=== Influencer career ===
While attending junior high school, Naenano began her social media career on platforms such as Twitter (now X) and MixChannel, and later rose to popularity as a TikToker. In July 2019, she opened her YouTube channel, where her videos where she displayed a relaxed personality became popular, and she reached 100,000 subscribers within the next two weeks. At the 2020 First Half Instagram Buzzword Awards, she was ranked 14th and 20th in the social media account and YouTuber categories, respectively. She reached one million YouTube subscribers in March 2022, and by June 2023, she had amassed a total of over seven million followers on her social media accounts.

As an influencer, Naenano is active on platforms like TikTok, Twitter, Instagram, YouTube, and Bilibili, and she is known for her widespread popularity among teenagers and Generation Z. One popular style she uses is the emo-gao (エモ顔; emo face), a technique for enhancing photos. By 2020, she was widely known as "the face that Japanese girls most want to have right now". In February 2024, she won the 7th Sneaker Best Dresser Award for Best Influencer.

=== Modeling career ===
On May 27, 2020, Kadokawa Corporation published Naenano's first style book, Naenano no Hon. (なえなののほん。), where she discusses her preferred cosmetic and fashion styles. It ranked first on the Amazon sale ranking and second in the Tohan weekly best-selling charts. Her photo essay Mada Hatachi, Mō Hatachi (まだハタチ、もう二十歳。; lt. Still 20, already 20) was published by Kadokawa on January 14, 2021, her 20th birthday; it ranked second in the Oricon Weekly Photobook Ranking.

On April 4, 2022, Kodansha published Naenano's third book, Nae to Naenano (なえとなえなの), where she made her first appearance wearing swimwear and underwear; Modelpress called her decision to do this "ambitious". On June 17, 2024, Kadokawa published another photo book, Naenano Concept Photobook Spotlight (なえなのCONCEPT PHOTOBOOK SPOTLIGHT)", a collection of her Gravure The Television magazine photographs divided into seven themed sets, with the eighth set being a shoot she did in Hanoi, Vietnam; Modelpress noted that it "allows you to enjoy the transformative Naenano".

In September 2020, Naenano appeared on the first cover of Larme since the start of their March 2020 hiatus. This was her first cover appearance for a women's fashion magazine.

=== Acting, broadcasting, and music career ===
From February to May 2021, Naenano appeared on the Ameba romance reality show Koi to Ōkami ni wa Damasarenai. From July to August 2021, she starred as Rinka Satō in the web series Taiketsu Rakugo. In January 2022, she made her terrestrial television drama debut starring as Urara Matsuhashi in the drama adaptation of the manga Harem Marriage.

In July 2021, Naenano's radio show Naenano no Bukapi na no (なえなののブカピなの) premiered on ABC Radio. In October 2021, she made her terrestrial television host debut in the variety show Bukatsu Pīpō Zenryoku Ōen! Bukapi!.

On June 28, 2023, Naenano made her singing debut with her single "Uanonosora" (うあのそら), the opening theme of Bukatsu Pīpō Zenryoku Ōen! Bukapi! and a collaboration with Radwimps' Yojiro Noda, whom she had been a fan of for years; Real Sound called the collaboration an "unexpected and unusual duo". In July 2023, she joined Tokyo Wangan Girls, a singing group on the Fuji TV variety show Yobidashi Sensei Tanaka.

=== Non-entertainment career ===
In January 2023, Naenano was appointed support ambassador by the Gotemba municipal government; her duties as ambassador included providing tourism training to municipal government employees.

In addition to public life, Naenano was a member of the table tennis club in junior high school and served as the manager of the Gotemba High School basketball team. She has also spoken about her struggles with depression, namely in an interview with Modelpress.

== Filmography ==
=== Television ===
Year	Title	Role	Notes	Ref.
2021	Koi to Ōkami ni wa Damasarenai	Herself		
2021	Taiketsu Rakugo	Rinka Satō		
2022	Harem Marriage	Urara Matsuhashi		
2024	Oshi no Ko	Yuki Sumi		

=== Film ===
Year	Title	Role	Notes	Ref.
2025	The Girl Who Sees	Yuria Niguredō		
2026	Mr. Osomatsu: Project Slackers	Chibita		
2027	The High School Family	Yuki		

== Discography ==
=== Singles ===
Title	Year	Details	Peak chart positions		Sales	Ref.
Title	Year	Details	JPN	JPN Comb.	Sales	Ref.
"Uanosora" (うあのそら)	2023	Released: June 28, 2023; Label: Space Shower Music; Format: Digital distribution	—	—	—	
"—" denotes releases that did not chart or were not released in that region.
