= Mieruko-chan =

Japanese manga series

- Cover of the first tankōbon volume, featuring Miko Yotsuya

見える子ちゃん
- Genre: Horror comedy
- Manga
- Written by: Tomoki Izumi
- Published by: Kadokawa Shoten
- English publisher: NA: Yen Press
- Imprint: MF Comics
- Magazine: Web Comic Apanta
- Original run: November 2, 2018 – present
- Volumes: 15
- Anime television series
- Directed by: Yuki Ogawa
- Produced by: Masaki Arimura; Joutarou Ishigami; Noritomo Isogai; Hajime Maruyama; Taiyou Matsuda; Mitsuhiro Ogata; Hiroo Saitou
- Written by: Kenta Ihara
- Music by: Kana Utatane
- Studio: Passione
- Licensed by: Crunchyroll: SA/SEA: Muse Communication
- Original network: AT-X, Tokyo MX, KBS Kyoto, SUN, BS NTV
- Original run: October 3, 2021 – December 19, 2021
- Episodes: 12
- icon

Mieruko-chan (見える子ちゃん; "The Girl Who Can See Them") is a Japanese manga series written and illustrated by Tomoki Izumi. It began serialization online via Kadokawa's Web Comic Apanta website in November 2018, with fifteen tankōbon volumes released so far. The manga is licensed in North America by Yen Press. An anime television series adaptation by Passione aired from October to December 2021.

== Premise ==
High school student Miko Yotsuya has the unfortunate ability to see horrifying ghosts and spirits that haunt her and the people around her. Despite this, Miko does her best to ignore the existence of ghosts and tries to live out a normal high school life.

== Characters ==
Miko Yotsuya (四谷 みこ, Yotsuya Miko)
Voiced by: Sora Amamiya (Japanese); Alexis Tipton (English)
A timid young girl and the protagonist of the story who suddenly became able to see ghosts without any known reason. To keep her usual daily life, she pretends not to see them, as well as making efforts to prevent her best friend Hana from seeing them.
Hana Yurikawa (百合川 ハナ, Yurikawa Hana)
Voiced by: Kaede Hondo (Japanese); Sarah Wiedenheft (English)
Miko's air-headed best friend who is oblivious to Miko's current situation. She is fond of eating. However, her eating also increases her life aura, which makes ghosts more attracted to her.
Yuria Niguredō (二暮堂 ユリア, Niguredō Yuria)
Voiced by: Ayane Sakura (Japanese); Lindsay Sheppard (English)
Miko and Hana's schoolmate who, like Miko, is also able to see ghosts. She is very fond of a local fortune teller and is disappointed when she closes her business. After finding out that Miko and Hana were the fortune teller's last customers, she becomes interested in the two, finding out that Miko has supernatural powers.
Michiru Ichijō (一条 みちる, Ichijō Michiru)
Voiced by: Saori Hayami (voice comic)
A mysterious transfer student who gains an interest in Miko. She works as a model.
Zen Tohno (遠野 善, Tōno Zen)
Voiced by: Yuichi Nakamura (Japanese); David Matranga (English)
A teacher who temporarily replaces Miko and Hana's homeroom teacher after she went on parental leave. Miko suspects him as someone who abuses stray cats. It is later revealed that he takes care of cats due to an incident during his childhood, as a result of a poor relationship with his mother.
Mitsue Takeda (タケダミツエ, Takeda Mitsue) / Godmother (ゴッドマザー, Goddomazā)
Voiced by: Ikuko Tani (Japanese); Wendy Powell (English)
A fortune teller who ran a spiritual business that Yuria frequented often while it was open. She gives up the business after Miko visited, but is curious about Miko's abilities.
Kyōsuke Yotsuya (四谷 恭介, Yotsuya Kyōsuke)
Voiced by: Yumiri Hanamori (Japanese); Suzie Yeung (English)
Miko's younger brother, who is determined to protect her while oblivious of Miko's current situation.
Tōko Yotsuya (四谷 透子, Yotsuya Tōko)
Voiced by: Hitomi Nabatame (Japanese); Elizabeth Maxwell (English)
Miko and Kyōsuke's mother. She started dating their father Mamoru in high school. She resembled Miko when she was younger.
Mamoru Yotsuya (四谷 真守, Yotsuya Mamoru)
Voiced by: Kohsuke Toriumi (Japanese); Michael Sorich (English)
Miko and Kyōsuke's father, who died prior to the events of the story.
Junji Rōsoku (ロウソク淳二, Rōsoku Junji)
Voiced by: Nobuo Tobita (Japanese); Steven Kelly (English)

== Media ==
=== Manga ===
Mieruko-chan is written and illustrated by Tomoki Izumi, and began serialization in Kadokawa's ComicWalker website on November 2, 2018. Kadokawa Shoten began publishing the series in print in April 2019 and have released fifteen tankōbon volumes as of November 2026. The series is licensed in English by Yen Press.

No.	Original release date	Original ISBN	English release date	English ISBN
1	April 22, 2019	978-4-04-065658-8	November 17, 2020	978-1-9753-1757-7
2	October 21, 2019	978-4-04-064092-1	February 23, 2021	978-1-9753-1759-1
3	March 21, 2020	978-4-04-064498-1	June 29, 2021	978-1-9753-2431-5
4	September 23, 2020	978-4-04-064898-9	November 16, 2021	978-1-9753-2569-5
5	March 22, 2021	978-4-04-680257-6	May 24, 2022	978-1-9753-4188-6
6	October 22, 2021	978-4-04-680715-1	November 22, 2022	978-1-9753-4974-5
7	March 22, 2022	978-4-04-681219-3	April 18, 2023	978-1-9753-6189-1
8	October 21, 2022	978-4-04-681772-3	September 19, 2023	978-1-9753-7384-9
9	May 23, 2023	978-4-04-682240-6	April 16, 2024	978-1-9753-8787-7
10	February 22, 2024	978-4-04-682879-8	February 18, 2025	979-8-8554-1104-1
11	October 23, 2024	978-4-04-683993-0	September 23, 2025	979-8-8554-2076-0
12	March 22, 2025	978-4-04-684470-5	April 28, 2026	979-8-8554-2825-4
13	October 23, 2025	978-4-04-685099-7	February 23, 2027	979-8-8554-4822-1
14	March 31, 2026	978-4-04-685697-5	—	—
15	November 20, 2026	978-4-04-660654-9	—	—

=== Anime ===
An anime television series adaptation was announced on March 18, 2021. The series is animated by Passione and directed by Yuki Ogawa, with Takahiro Majima serving as assistant director, Shintarō Matsushima serving as directing assistant, Kenta Ihara supervising and writing the series' scripts, Chikashi Kadekaru designing the characters and serving as chief animation director, and Makoto Uno designing the monsters. Kana Utatane composed the music for the series. Sora Amamiya performed the opening theme "Mienai Kara ne!?" (見えないからね!?; "I Can't See Them, Okay!?"), as well as the ending theme "Mita na? Mita yo ne?? Miteru yo ne???" (ミタナ？ミタヨネ？？ミテルヨネ？？？; "You Saw Me? You Saw Me, Right?? You're Seeing Me Right Now, Right???"). The series aired from October 3 to December 19, 2021, on AT-X, Tokyo MX, KBS Kyoto, SUN, and BS NTV. Funimation licensed the series outside of Asia. Muse Communication licensed the series in South and Southeast Asia.

On December 10, 2021, Funimation announced the series would receive an English dub, which premiered on December 12.

No.	Title	Directed by	Written by	Storyboarded by	Original release date
1	"Can You See Them?"; Transliteration: "Mieru?" (Japanese: 見える？)	Shintarō Matsushima	Kenta Ihara	Yūki Ogawa	October 3, 2021
Miko Yotsuya begins noticing things, such as dogs barking at nothing and a handprint on her mirror. At school she meets her friend Hana Yurikawa and a red eyed girl from another class who almost talks to her but decides not to. Later Miko's charm goes missing so she returns to school to find it and sees a human shaped mist that disappears. Waiting at a bus stop in the rain a terrifying ghost of an old, rotting woman appears and demands to know if Miko can see her. Despite her terror Miko pretends she sees nothing, and the ghost eventually vanishes. Miko returns home, but while preparing for bed the ghost of a man appears in her bathroom and leans with his hand on the mirror, explaining the handprint she saw that morning. He too demands to know if she can see him, but she manages to ignore him until he vanishes. Placing salt in her room to drive away spirits Miko attempts to sleep but realizes the salt does not work as the man reappears with his head on her stomach. The next day at school Miko sees the ghost of a deceased student and tearfully realizes she has not been dreaming, she really is seeing ghosts.
2	"She Totally Sees Them"; Transliteration: "Chō Mieru" (Japanese: 超見える)	Takahiro Majima	Kenta Ihara	Yūki Ogawa	October 10, 2021
Miko starts seeing ghosts at school, starting with the ghost of a schoolgirl that wanders the halls and then to a disembodied head that haunts the school locker room. She then sees a ghost groping Hana and is unable to get rid of it until it sees the more attractive school nurse and switches to groping her instead. After school, Miko and Hana go out to buy pastries, but Miko gets distracted looking at her phone and accidentally ends up in a line of ghosts queuing up to be eaten by a much larger ghost. After buying their pastries, Hana and Miko come across an abandoned kitten being haunted by a ghost that just stares at it. Hana sends out a social media post to see if anybody is willing to adopt a kitten. Two men show up separately, one a handsome young man and the other an intimidating looking scarred man. Miko sees the handsome man surrounded by evil cat spirits, and gives the kitten to the scarred man, who has two angelic cat spirits having two tails watching over him. The scarred man accepts the kitten and takes it home, where it's revealed he got his scars from cat scratches. He lovingly takes care of the kitten while the spirits of his wife and his previously owned cats watch over him.
3	"She Still Sees Them"; Transliteration: "Mada Mieru" (Japanese: まだ見える)	Mitsuki Kitamura	Kenta Ihara	Takashi Sano	October 17, 2021
Miko heads out to meet Hana at a cafe but is haunted by a chatty ghost on the bus ride there. At the cafe, she sees a handsome young man haunted by the spirit of a clingy jealous woman and has to covertly convince the ghost she's not interested in the man. After Hana arrives, Miko sees the handsome man is dating a woman who is haunted by numerous spirits of clingy jealous men, giving her the impression that they are both unfaithful lovers. Miko then buys some prayer beads to try and ward away the ghosts, and while they initially work, the prayer beads immediately break when she encounters a much more powerful ghost. Seeing Miko's prayer beads break, Hana takes Miko to a local fortune teller called the Godmother. The Godmother initially tests a cheap prayer bead on Miko in an effort to scam her but realizes Miko is haunted when the prayer bead breaks, and she can see the faint shape of a ghost behind Miko. She also sees Hana radiating a powerful energy aura, which protects her from ghosts but also serves to attract them. In order to help Miko, the Godmother gives Miko her most powerful prayer beads. However, the prayer beads also break. Miko gives up on trying to use prayer beads, and the Godmother, whose real name is Mitsue Takeda, decides to retire from fortune telling and live with her son in the countryside.
4	"Yep, She Sees Them"; Transliteration: "Yappari Mieru" (Japanese: やっぱり見える)	Takahiro Majima	Kenta Ihara	Yūki Ogawa	October 24, 2021
Miko continues trying to cope with a life of being able to see ghosts as she starts seeing them in bookstores and around vending machines. While shopping with Hana, she picks up a special seasonal chestnut pudding. Meanwhile, Miko's brother Kyousuke notices her strange behavior and comes to suspect that she's in an abusive relationship with a boyfriend. Wanting to protect Miko, Kyousuke secretly follows Miko around, but is unaware of the ghosts haunting her. Later that night, Miko sees a ghost in her bathroom and not wanting to make it look suspicious welcomes an embarrassed Kyousuke who was just outside the bathroom to see if she had any hickeys, to take a bath with her, to ward away the ghost. Kyousuke doesn't see any marks like hickeys on her body and relaxes further when she says she doesn't have a boyfriend. The next day, Miko tries to eat breakfast with her family, but a large ghost appears around them. Miko excuses herself and leaves the chestnut pudding on her father's funeral altar. It's then revealed that Miko's father has been a ghost all this time. Her father apologizes for eating her pudding last year without her permission. He never got the chance to do so before dying in an accident. Miko takes happiness in that she was able to have closure with her father. An after credits scene reveals she can now see ghosts through television broadcasts, as well.
5	"She Sees Them, Too"; Transliteration: "Watashi mo Mieru" (Japanese: ワタシも見える)	Shintarō Matsushima, Takahiro Majima	Kenta Ihara	Naruyo Takahashi	October 31, 2021
One of Miko's schoolmates, Yuria Niguredō, is shocked to see Mitsue (the Godmother) has closed down, as she had wanted to be her apprentice. It's revealed that Yuria can also see ghosts since she was young and dreams of becoming a fortuneteller and an exorcist herself. She learns that Miko was the last customer Mitsue had seen, and witnesses Miko avoiding a ghost. Yuria confronts Miko at school, telling her that she can see ghosts as well, but Miko continues to deny it. It's revealed that the much more powerful ghosts Miko can see are still invisible to Yuria, and Yuria's boasting of her abilities attracts the attention of one such ghost nearby. In order to keep it away, Miko is forced to subdue and knock out Yuria. Yuria recovers in the nurse's office, where Miko apologizes to her, but Yuria interprets Miko's words as a threat to stay away from her. Later that night while coming back from school, Miko comes across an old woman who has poor memory. She takes the woman to her home but is haunted by a ghost near the woman's home continually whispering the numbers "4631" to her. Miko shows the old woman the numbers and she use those to open a safe containing a special hair comb from her husband, and she regains her memories after putting it on. The husband's ghost thanks Miko before letting himself be eaten by a larger ghost.
6	"She Sees Real Crazy Ones"; Transliteration: "Sugoi no Mieru" (Japanese: スゴいの見える)	Mitsuki Kitamura	Kenta Ihara	Yūki Ogawa	November 7, 2021
While coming back from a pastry shop with Hana, Miko sees a very large and scary ghost. Hana heads out to meet Miko, not knowing the same ghost is haunting her, using her life force aura to cook and eat smaller ghosts. She then comes across a young boy whose dog ran away into an abandoned building, and she agrees to help find the dog. She manages the find the dog and return it to the boy, but the ghost following her has fed so much that it has heavily mutated by the time she meets up with Miko. Miko takes Hana to Miketsudani Shrine in hopes of finding a way to get rid of the ghost. They make a prayer at the shrine and Miko wishes to get rid of the ghost. As if in response, a pair of shrine maiden spirits and a massive spirit arrive and destroy the ghost. The larger spirit then utters the cryptic words "Three Times" to Miko before disappearing, leaving her uncertain about what it meant.
7	"Did You See That?"; Transliteration: "Mita?" (Japanese: 見た？)	Shintarō Matsushima	Kenta Ihara	Ikurō Morimoto	November 14, 2021
Still remembering how Miko humiliated her, Yuria swears to get revenge on her perceived rival. After noticing her photo of herself and Miko at the shrine has garnered multiple likes on social media, Hana decides to pick up photography as a hobby. Taking advantage of this, Yuria suggests that they go to a scenic spot in the mountains for a photo shoot. As they travel there, Yuria reveals they'll have to travel through a haunted tunnel to reach the spot. As expected, the tunnel is full of low-level ghosts, which Yuria hopes can force Miko to admit she can see them. However, what Yuria doesn't see is a higher-level ghost that arrives and begins devouring the other ghosts. From Yuria's perspective, she thinks that Miko is effortlessly exorcising the ghosts. As Yuria continues to try and get Miko's attention, the high-level ghost becomes attracted to them. The shrine spirit maidens then intervene and chase off the ghost, giving Miko, Yuria, and Hana the opportunity to leave the tunnel. On the trip home, Hana takes a picture of all three of them and sends it to Miko and Yuria, accepting Yuria as her new friend. Yuria, who has always been considered an outcast, is touched by Hana's kindness. As they are eating bread from a pastry shop, Yuria wonders why so many ghosts gathered in the tunnel when she notices a small ghost clinging to Hana's leg that gets burnt from her aura and she figures out the reason. As she is about to tell Hana, she misunderstands that Miko is threatening her not to say anything about it and gets intimidated by her.
8	"The Things She Sees"; Transliteration: "Mieteru Mono" (Japanese: 見えてるもの)	Tatsuya Ishiguro	Kenta Ihara	Takashi Sano	November 21, 2021
Miko and Kyousuke go out shopping for a birthday present for their mother. Despite being haunted by an attendant ghost, Miko and Kyousuke are able to pick a pair of matching mugs as the gift. On the train home, Miko sees an axe wielding ghost attacking the passengers on the train, though its axe passes through them harmlessly. Regardless, Miko is terrified when she sees the axe ghost attack and capture another ghost inside a person sitting beside her. Although Miko avoids reacting when it attacks her, she wets herself and has to get off the train early. Later, Miko and Hana help their teacher pack up, as she is going on maternity leave. Miko then sees a ghost apparently haunting her teacher's womb, and she reveals that she was previously pregnant, but her child died. Miko then realizes the ghost it the spirit of the deceased child, which has returned to protect his sibling. That night, Miko ponders why she's able to see ghosts and wonders if she should try helping or confronting them but decides to keep ignoring them when she sees a disgusting one near a vending machine. The next day, the substitute teacher for Miko's class arrives, and she's horrified to see that it is Zen Tohno, the man who she previously saw who is haunted by evil cat spirits. Meanwhile, the scarred man is seen still taking care of his newly adopted cat and celebrates his wedding anniversary in honor of his deceased wife.
9	"Things She's Seen Before"; Transliteration: "Mita Koto Aru" (Japanese: 見たことある)	Tadashi Nakamura	Kenta Ihara	Naruyo Takahashi	November 28, 2021
While trying to avoid Zen and the ghosts haunting him, Miko accidentally encounters Yuria eating alone in the bathroom. Since a large ghost is haunting the bathroom, Miko advises Yuria to stop eating in there, and Hana suggests that Yuria can eat lunch with them from now on. Miko then resolves to keep an eye on Zen but suddenly a large female ghost appears and threatens her not to look at him. The three girls then decide to go to a haunted house event to win a free box of donuts. While Miko doesn't initially react to the conventional haunted house scares, she has an epiphany that the haunted house attraction is a place where she can openly show fear without attracting the attention of ghosts. Miko ends up with a much better mood after being able to let out her feelings of fear in a moment of catharsis. As the girls return home, they pass by Mitsue's closed down shop and wonder what she is doing. In the countryside, Mitsue has taken up farming to help out her family.
10	"Don't Look"; Transliteration: "Miru na" (Japanese: 見るな)	Mitsuki Kitamura, Takahiro Majima, Shun'ichi Katō	Kenta Ihara	Takeo Takahashi	December 5, 2021
Zen hears from his neighbor that someone is apparently murdering cats in their neighborhood. He then heads to school where he starts teaching his class. Miko finds it increasingly difficult to focus on class due to the large female ghost haunting Zen warning everyone not to look at him. When Hana feels faint from hunger, Miko takes the chance to bring her to the infirmary just so she can leave the classroom. However, Miko begins to wonder if the ghosts haunting Zen are affecting Hana's life aura, which is what is making her hungrier than usual. While accompanying Hana to a park, Miko accidentally attracts the attention of a hostile ghost posing as a human child, which then tries to attack her, but it is destroyed by the shrine maiden spirits. Miko then realizes that the shrine spirit words "three times" meant the shrine maidens would only protect her three times, and she has already inadvertently called on their aid twice, leaving only one more chance to use them for protection. Later that night, a man approaches a cat with the intent to harm it, but he is forced to leave when a pair of students happen to pass by.
11	"She Looks"; Transliteration: "Miru?" (Japanese: 見る？)	Shintarō Matsushima, Shun'ichi Katō	Kenta Ihara	Ikurō Morimoto	December 12, 2021
A flashback reveals that as a child, Zen was raised by an extremely overbearing mother. In the present, Miko secretly follows Zen to try and find evidence of wrongdoing so he can be removed from the school. She sees Zen encounter a kitten, and fearing he will harm it, intervenes to take it away from him. However, as she tries to run away, the kitten escapes from her grasp and runs onto the road. Zen then dives in to rescue the kitten, being hit by a car in the process. Another flashback shows a young Zen secretly adopting a stray kitten, only for his mother to find out and kill it, further traumatizing him. At the hospital, Zen reveals to Miko that he's been trying to look for a criminal who has been attacking cats. Zen's friend Satoru then arrives and explains Zen's family situation to Miko, and she realizes the ghost haunting Zen is the ghost of his mother. She then taunts the ghost into attacking her, causing the shrine maiden spirits to destroy her, and up Miko's third chance.
12	"The Girl Who Sees, Mieruko-chan"; Transliteration: "Mieruko-chan" (Japanese: 見える子ちゃん)	Takahiro Majima, Tatsuya Ishiguro	Kenta Ihara	Yūki Ogawa	December 19, 2021
After the ghost of Zen's mother is destroyed, Zen begins to feel better now that he is no longer haunted by her and lets go of his old burdens and guilt. This allows the cat spirits surrounding him to be purified and pass away peacefully, including the spirit of his old pet kitten. Miko then arranges for him to adopt the kitten he had rescued. Later, Zen manages to intercept the person attacking the cats and knocks him out with a taser. However, the fate of the man remains unknown as police put up a missing person's poster for him. In the countryside, Mitsue is shocked when she receives a picture of Miko and Hana at the shrine from an anonymous sender. At school, Miko gets the idea to try and thank the shrine spirit for helping her, so she travels to the shrine to give an offering. However, this appears to anger the shrine spirit, which then moves to devour her. Miko then awakens in bed, her shrine visit being nothing but a nightmare. She then goes about her day, now having gotten accustomed to seeing ghosts and ignoring them, though she still wonders how and why she is suddenly able to see ghosts. However, as she walks home with Hana and Yuria, the shrine spirit and the shrine maidens can be seen secretly following Miko.

=== Film ===
A live-action film adaptation, directed by Yoshihiro Nakamura, was released on June 6, 2025.

==== Cast ====
- Nanoka Hara as Miko Yotsuya
- Rinka Kumada as Hana Yurikawa
- Naenano as Yuria Niguredo

== Reception ==
=== Manga ===
In 2019, Mieruko-chan was nominated for the 5th Next Manga Awards in the digital category and placed 10th out of 50 nominees. As of October 2022, the manga had over two million copies in circulation.

Anime News Network (ANN) had two editors review the first volume of the manga: Rebecca Silverman praised the final chapter for taking the story in a more sustainable direction than the first two Hana-filled ones, but critiqued that it felt "pretty disconnected" from the beginning, concluding with: "Since it does have interesting art (and mild fanservice if you're looking for that) and an evolving mythology, I think it will be worth giving it that second volume to even itself out." Caitlin Moore commended Tomoki's creative designs on the horrific ghosts and Miko's "body language and facial expressions" when ignoring them, but was critical of the horny "gaze-y camera angles" and "random, subtle out-of-place fanservice shots" distracting her from enjoying the manga's concept, concluding with: "I'm having a hard time not thinking of the manga this could have been with a different author – one where the horrors Miko encounters are metaphors for the intrusions a teenage girl faces, instead of the paneling intruding on her itself."

=== Anime ===
Fellow ANN editor Nicholas Dupree placed Mieruko-chan at number five on his top 5 best anime list of 2021, praising the adaptation's combination of deadpan comedy with "absolutely rock-solid horror fundamentals" and delivering "sincere, heartwarming moments" that show the afterlife's sentimental side, concluding that: "All of that combined gives you a show that can scare you, punch you in the gut, and then make you laugh like an idiot in a single episode." Allen Moody from THEM Anime Reviews wrote: "I'm calling this an interesting failure. The situation is not without its fascinating aspects, but you usually like to see some progression in the protagonist's situation, and it's largely absent here."
