= 47th Japan Academy Film Prize =

Japanese film awards in 2024

- Date: March 8, 2024
- Site: Grand Prince Hotel Shin Takanawa, Tokyo, Japan
- Hosted by: Shinichi Hatori; Yukino Kishii

Highlights
- Best Picture: Godzilla Minus One
- Most awards: Godzilla Minus One (8)
- Most nominations: Godzilla Minus One (12)

The 47th Japan Academy Film Prize (第47回日本アカデミー賞) is the 47th edition of the Japan Academy Film Prize, an award presented by the Nippon Academy-Sho Association to award excellence in filmmaking. It took place at the Grand Prince Hotel Shin Takanawa in Tokyo on March 8, 2024, with free announcer Shinichi Hatori and actress Yukino Kishii hosting the show.

The nominations were announced on January 25, 2024. Godzilla Minus One led with 12 nominations, followed by Monster and Mom, Is That You?! with 11.

== Winners and nominees ==
=== Awards ===
Best Film	Best Animation Film
Godzilla Minus One; Monster; Mom, Is That You?!; September 1923; Perfect Days	The Boy and the Heron; Birth of Kitarō: The Mystery of GeGeGe; Totto-Chan: The Little Girl at the Window; Detective Conan: Black Iron Submarine; Blue Giant
Best Director	Best Screenplay
Wim Wenders – Perfect Days; Hirokazu Kore-eda – Monster; Yōichi Narita – Till We Meet Again on the Lily Hill; Tatsuya Mori – September 1923; Takashi Yamazaki – Godzilla Minus One	Takashi Yamazaki – Godzilla Minus One; Toshimichi Saeki, Jun'ichi Inoue, and Haruhiko Arai – September 1923; Michio Tsubaki – Shylock's Children; Hiroshi Hashimoto – Till We Meet Again on the Lily Hill; Yoji Yamada and Yūzō Asahara – Mom, Is That You?!
Best Actor	Best Actress
Koji Yakusho – Perfect Days; Sadao Abe – Shylock's Children; Ryunosuke Kamiki – Godzilla Minus One; Ryohei Suzuki – Egoist; Koshi Mizukami – Till We Meet Again on the Lily Hill	Sakura Ando – Monster; Haruka Ayase – Revolver Lily; Hana Sugisaki – Ichiko; Minami Hamabe – Godzilla Minus One; Sayuri Yoshinaga – Mom, Is That You?!
Best Supporting Actor	Best Supporting Actress
Hayato Isomura – The Moon; Kentarō Itō – Till We Meet Again on the Lily Hill; Yo Oizumi – Mom, Is That You?!; Ryo Kase – Kubi; Masaki Suda – Father of the Milky Way Railroad	Sakura Ando – Godzilla Minus One; Aya Ueto – Shylock's Children; Mei Nagano – Mom, Is That You?!; Minami Hamabe – Shin Kamen Rider; Keiko Matsuzaka – Till We Meet Again on the Lily Hill
Best Music	Best Cinematography
Hiromi Uehara – Blue Giant; Takeshi Kobayashi – Kyrie; Ryuichi Sakamoto – Monster; Naoki Satō – Godzilla Minus One; Akira Senju – Mom, Is That You?!	Kōzō Shibasaki – Godzilla Minus One; Ryūto Kondō – Monster; Akira Sakō – Kingdom 3: The Flame of Destiny; Shinji Chikamori – Mom, Is That You?!; Takeshi Hamada – Kubi
Best Lighting Direction	Best Art Direction
Nariyuki Ueda – Godzilla Minus One; Eiji Oshita – Monster; Hiroyuki Kase – Kingdom 3: The Flame of Destiny; Masato Tsuchiyama – Mom, Is That You?!; Hitoshi Takaya – Kubi	Anri Jōjō – Godzilla Minus One; Yukiharu Seshimo – Kubi; Takashi Nishimura – Mom, Is That You?!; Hajime Hashimoto – The Legend and Butterfly; Keiko Mitsumatsu and Hyeon Seon-seo – Monster
Best Sound Recording	Best Film Editing
Hisafumi Takeuchi – Godzilla Minus One; Kentarō Suzuki – Till We Meet Again on the Lily Hill; Yasuo Takano – Kubi; Kazuhiko Tomita – Monster; Shōta Nagamura – Mom, Is That You?!	Ryūji Miyajima – Godzilla Minus One; Norihiro Iwama – Till We Meet Again on the Lily Hill; Takeshi Kitano and Yoshinori Ōta – Kubi; Hirokazu Kore-eda – Monster; Hiroshi Sugimoto – Mom, Is That You?!
Best Foreign Language Film	Newcomer of the Year
Mission: Impossible – Dead Reckoning Part One; Killers of the Flower Moon; Barbie; Driving Madeleine; Tár	Aina the End – Kyrie; Hiyori Sakurada – Our Secret Diary; Nanoka Hara – Don't Call It Mystery; Haruka Fukuhara – Till We Meet Again on the Lily Hill; Ichikawa Somegorō VIII – The Legend and Butterfly; Sōya Kurokawa – Monster; Fumiya Takahashi – Our Secret Diary; Hinata Hiiragi – Monster
Special Award	Award for Distinguished Service from the Chairman
Cine Bazar; Tokyo Laboratory	Norimichi Igawa; Masaharu Ueda; Akira Kobayashi; Tadashi Sakai; Yōichi Higashi; Kazuo Yabe
Special Award from the Association	Special Award from the Chairman
Kōji Ōmura; Yumiko Kuga; Teruyuki Hyakusoku; Keizō Murase	Ryuichi Sakamoto; Shūji Abe
