= Adabana (manga) =

Japanese manga series

- Cover of the first volume

adabana -徒花-
- Genre: Suspense
- Manga
- Written by: NON
- Published by: Shueisha
- English publisher: NA: Dark Horse Comics
- Magazine: Grand Jump
- Original run: March 18, 2020 – June 16, 2021
- Volumes: 3
- icon

Adabana (adabana -徒花-; "Sterile Flower" or "Without Substance") is a Japanese manga series written and illustrated by NON. It was serialized in Shueisha's seinen manga magazine Grand Jump from March 2020 to June 2021, with its chapters collected in three tankōbon volumes.

== Plot ==
The mutilated body of Mako Igarashi, a high school student, is discovered in a rural town covered in snow. Following this, her classmate Mizuki Aikawa confessed to the crime. The subsequent investigation yielded two conflicting accounts of the events: one from the perspective of the confessed perpetrator, and another from the victim's perspective. Initially, official proceedings rely on Mizuki's testimony. However, evidence from six months prior, documented through Mako's experiences, presents a conflicting version of the incident's origins. This discrepancy becomes a central point of contention.

Both students came from severely dysfunctional families. Mizuki experienced intense academic pressure from her mother and came from a family with a history of suicide, including that of her older brother. Mako lived in poverty and was coerced into providing financial support to a relative. With no effective adult support systems in place, the two students became each other's sole means of emotional survival. Defense attorney Yutaka Tsuji and his associate Hayami undertake Mizuki's legal representation. Their investigation into the contradictory evidence, which culminated in a courtroom trial, is key to establish the truth behind the crime and the relationship between the two students.

== Publication ==
Written and illustrated by NON, Adabana was serialized in Shueisha's seinen manga magazine Grand Jump from March 18, 2020, to June 16, 2021. Shueisha collected its chapters in three tankōbon volumes, released from August 19, 2020, to July 16, 2021.

In February 2025, Dark Horse Comics announced that it had licensed the manga for English release in North America, with the first volume set to be released on September 2.

=== Volumes ===
No.	Original release date	Original ISBN	English release date	English ISBN
1	August 19, 2020	978-4-08-891634-7	September 2, 2025	978-1-5067-4929-7
2	January 19, 2021	978-4-08-891772-6	January 13, 2026	978-1-5067-5101-6
3	July 16, 2021	978-4-08-892022-1	June 16, 2026	978-1-5067-4931-0

== See also ==
- Delivery Cinderella, another manga series by the same author
- Harem Marriage, another manga series by the same author
