= Hinata Hiiragi =

Japanese actor

- 柊木 陽太
- Born: September 10, 2011 (age 14); Kyoto Prefecture, Japan
- Occupation: Actor
- Years active: 2019–present
- Known for: Monster as Yori Hoshikawa

Hinata Hiiragi (柊木 陽太, Hiiragi Hinata; born September 10, 2011) is a Japanese actor from Kyoto Prefecture. He is best known internationally for his role as Yori Hoshikawa in Hirokazu Kore-eda's Monster (2023).

== Filmography ==
=== Film ===
Year	Title	Role	Notes	Ref.
2023	One Second Ahead, One Second Behind	Hajime (childhood)		
2023	Monster	Yori Hoshikawa	Lead role	
2026	Sheep in the Box	Takuto Konno		

=== Television ===
Year	Title	Role	Notes	Ref.
2022	PICU	Keigo Komatsu	Episodes 5–11	
2024	Dear Radiance	Emperor Ichijō (young)	Taiga drama	
2024	VR Ojisan's First Love	Aoi Ashihara		
2026	Brothers in Arms	Hashiba Hidekatsu	Taiga drama	

== Awards ==
Year	Award	Category	Nominated work(s)	Result	Ref.
2024	Blue Ribbon Awards	Best Newcomer	Monster; One Second Ahead, One Second Behind	Nominated	
2024	Japan Academy Film Prize	Newcomer of the Year	Monster	Won	
