= Delivery Cinderella =

Japanese manga series

- Cover of the first volume

デリバリーシンデレラ (Deribarī Shinderera)
- Genre: Erotic comedy
- Manga
- Written by: NON
- Published by: Shueisha
- Magazine: Weekly Young Jump
- Original run: January 7, 2010 – June 21, 2012
- Volumes: 11
- icon

Delivery Cinderella (Japanese: デリバリーシンデレラ, Hepburn: Deribarī Shinderera) is a Japanese manga series written and illustrated by NON. It was serialized in Shueisha's seinen manga magazine Weekly Young Jump from January 2010 to June 2012, with its chapters collected in eleven tankōbon volumes.

== Publication ==
Written and illustrated by NON, Delivery Cinderella was serialized in Shueisha's seinen manga magazine Weekly Young Jump from January 7, 2010, to June 21, 2012. Shueisha collected its chapters in eleven tankōbon volumes, released from May 19, 2010, to July 19, 2012.

=== Volumes ===
No.	Japanese release date	Japanese ISBN
1	May 19, 2010	978-4-08-877856-3
2	August 19, 2010	978-4-08-879008-4
3	September 17, 2010	978-4-08-879032-9
4	December 17, 2010	978-4-08-879078-7
5	March 18, 2011	978-4-08-879117-3
6	June 17, 2011	978-4-08-879146-3
7	September 16, 2011	978-4-08-879204-0
8	December 19, 2011	978-4-08-879240-8
9	April 19, 2012	978-4-08-879316-0
10	July 19, 2012	978-4-08-879374-0
11	July 19, 2012	978-4-08-879375-7

== See also ==
- Harem Marriage, another manga series by the same author
- Adabana, another manga series by the same author
