= Kenji Yamada (producer) =

Japanese film and television producer (born 1979)

- 山田 兼司
- Born: 1979 (age 46–47); Saitama, Japan
- Education: Keio University
- Occupations: Film and television producer, planner
- Years active: 2003–present
- Title: Chief Manager of Planning and Production at Toho

Kenji Yamada (山田 兼司, Yamada Kenji; born 1979) is a Japanese film and television producer who is currently the Chief Manager of Planning and Production at Toho. He is best known for working on the 2023 films Monster and Godzilla Minus One, as well as Exit 8 (2025). Yamada became a member of the Producers Guild of America in 2024.

== Life and career ==
Born in 1979 in Saitama Prefecture, Japan. After graduating from Keio University, Yamada found employment at TV Asahi in 2003 and remained working there for more than a decade winning many awards for his efforts including two Tokyo Drama Awards and a Galaxy Award. Among his television credits are Dele (2018) and The Makanai: Cooking for the Maiko House (2023).

Yamada has planned and/or produced several live-action films in his career, including Samayou Yaiba (2009), Ghostbook, A Hundred Flower (both 2022), Monster, Godzilla Minus One (both 2023), April, Come She Will (2024), 1ST KISS, and Exit 8 (both 2025). He became a Toho employee in April 2019 and is currently the Chief Manager of Planning and Production at Toho. In 2024, Yamada won an Asia Game Changer Award and became a member of the Producers Guild of America (PGA).
