= Wonderful Everyday =

2010 visual novel and eroge

- Cover art
- Developer: KeroQ
- Publishers: JP: KeroQ; WW: Frontwing
- Director: SCA-DI
- Producer: SCA-DI
- Artists: Kagome; Motoyon; Suzuri; Karory; Aka Akasaka; SCA-DI
- Writer: SCA-DI
- Composers: Matsumoto Fuminori; ryo; Pixelbee; H.B Studio
- Engine: Ethornell
- Platform: Windows
- Release: JP: March 26, 2010; WW: August 30, 2017
- Genre: Visual novel
- Mode: Single-player

Wonderful Everyday: Diskontinuierliches Dasein (Japanese: 素晴らしき日々 ～不連続存在～, Hepburn: Subarashiki Hibi ~Furenzoku Sonzai~), (Note: The subtitle means "discontinuous existence" in German.) often abbreviated as SubaHibi, is a Japanese denpa horror mystery visual novel developed by KeroQ. It was released for Windows in 2010 and was given an international release by Frontwing in 2017. It is KeroQ's fourth game after Tsui no Sora, Nijūei and Moekan. SubaHibi shares characters and plot elements with Tsui no Sora, of which it is an expanded retelling.

== Gameplay ==
The game requires minimal interaction from the player, as the duration of the game is spent on reading onscreen text, which represents either dialogue between characters, narration, or the inner thoughts of the protagonist. A number of choices exist, some of which determine the plot branch on which a story continues. The game has a generic U.I for a visual novel, with the text appearing at the bottom of the screen, but there are also segments that exist where text is overlaid across the entire screen.

== Plot ==
Wonderful Everyday consists of seven chapters, the titles of which are taken from Alice's Adventures in Wonderland and Through the Looking Glass. Most chapters take place in the fictional Suginomiya neighborhood of Tokyo and recount the month of July 2012 from different perspectives. A prologue chapter, largely unconnected to the main narrative, focuses on Yuki's relationship with Zakuro and the fictional Wakatsuki sisters, Tsukasa and Kagami, with whom the player is given a choice of a romance.

Seven years prior to the beginning of the story, young Tomosane Mamiya is living a peaceful life in the village of Sawaimura, with his half-sister, Hasaki, and Yuki Minakami, a student at a nearby dojo, while estranged from Hasaki's mother, Kotomi Sasami. Kotomi had an affair with a cult leader in order to give birth to "the savior," resulting in Hasaki's birth as twins alongside her brother, Takuji. The leader deemed that neither could be the savior and cast Kotomi out. Kotomi directs Takuji to kill Hasaki as she believes that her death will restore Takuji's powers. Hasaki survives, but Yuki dies saving Hasaki, and Takuji is stabbed and accidentally killed by Tomosane. The trauma of the incident causes Tomosane to develop a dissociative personality disorder, at which point he introjects the personalities of Yuki and Takuji, from whose perspective certain chapters are shown.

Kotomi, grieving Takuji's death, raises Tomosane as Takuji. Takuji is plagued by delusions, as well as victimized by severe bullying, which escalates to rape, causing Tomosane's personality to resurface, albeit believing that he is an alternate personality of Takuji with no memory of his past. Tomosane believes he must erase Takuji so that Yuki may become the dominant personality. To this end, he bullies Takuji (unaware of the disassociation), trying to make him disappear.

Takuji meets and develops a crush on a girl named Zakuro Takashima, whom Yuki also meets and briefly dates. Zakuro, meanwhile, is bullied by several students at the school. As the bullying escalates, Zakuro ends up being drugged and gang raped, which sends her into a trauma-fueled spiral of depression and hallucinations. Zakuro meets two girls who convince her that they must have a near-death experience to prevent an oncoming apocalypse. The ritual results in the deaths of all three girls. Takuji witnesses Zakuro's death, which further traumatizes him and changes his personality. Tomosane again attempts to erase Takuji, but is defeated and disappears.

Yuki learns of Zakuro's death the day after, and investigates. Takuji discovers Zakuro's apocalyptic prophecy written on her desk, and this motivates him to carry out her supposed dying wishes. Yuki finds a message board where students theorize about Zakuro's death. Unbeknownst to Yuki, the message board's administrator is Takuji, who later announces to the class that Zakuro's death was an omen of the coming apocalypse. Claiming that they will be forgiven by Zakuro's spirit if they follow him, he recruits his classmates into a cult and orders them to commit various crimes.

Tomosane reassumes control of his body and tries to stop Takuji, but fails. Yuki, experiencing dissociative amnesia, is confused by the impacts of Takuji's actions. Takuji leads the cult to leap from the roof in a mass ritual suicide. Hasaki attempts to save Tomosane's body from falling. Tomosane, now remembering the truth of his past, takes control again, at which point he breaks his fall.

In Jabberwocky I, the player is offered a choice to have Tomosane romance Yuki, Hasaki, or no one. Depending on the branch chosen, one of three endings follows.

- Hill of Sunflowers
  Tomosane survives his fall. A year later, he revisits Sawaimura with Hasaki and Yuki. They reflect on their memories of Sawaimura, and Hasaki expresses jealousy towards Yuki for courting Tomosane's love.
- Wonderful Everyday
  Hasaki and Tomosane visit Kotomi and reflect on her role in the incident.
- End Sky II
  Yuki awakens on the rooftop of Kita High, greeted by Ayana. Yuki questions Ayana about what has become of Tomosane, to which Ayana responds cryptically.

An epilogue chapter (Note: In the Japanese-exclusive "Full Voice HD Edition") follows Tomosane and Yuki, who are still sharing Tomosane's body after the events of Hill of Sunflowers. Yuki wishes to pursue a romance with Tomosane; he initially rejects her as he fears she will disappear, but they commit after confiding their feelings. Yuki assures Tomosane she will never disappear, and they promise to always live together.

== Development ==
The first game developed by SCA-DI and its studio KeroQ was Tsui no Sora, first released in 1999. Because of some technical issues with the game, compounded with a large audience of people who wanted to play it in spite of those issues, KeroQ began production on a remake of the game. However, the remake's scope drastically expanded during production, leading SCA-DI to realize that he was in fact creating an entirely new work, which would eventually be released as Subarashiki Hibi (shortened as Subahibi). While Tsui no Sora was inspired primarily by the works of Friedrich Nietzsche, Subahibi instead pulled concepts largely from the works of Ludwig Wittgenstein, particularly the Tractatus Logico-Philosophicus. As the producer, planner, and scenario writer for Wonderful Everyday, SCA-DI worked on the character designs and graphics alongside Kagome, Motoyon, Suzuri, and Karory. Renowned mangaka Aka Akasaka, creator of Kaguya-sama: Love Is War, contributed to the backgrounds assets.

Prior to the release of Wonderful Everyday, a demo of the game was made available on the official website on January 30, 2010. Wonderful Everyday was originally planned to be released on February 26, 2010, but a release was announced on December 26, 2009, pushing the release date one month back to March 26, 2010.

The opening song of Wonderful Everyday, "Kūkirikigaku Shōjo to Shōnen no Uta" (空気力学少女と少年の詩, Aerodynamics Girls and Boys Song), was performed by Hana, who also performed the ending songs "Shuumatsu no Bishou" (終末の微笑, The Final Smile) and "Norowareta Sei / Shukufukusareta Sei" (呪われた生／祝福された生, Cursed Life/Blessed Life). Monet performed the other ending songs: "Naglfar no Senjou nite" (ナグルファルの船上にて, On Board Naglfar), "Kami to Senritsu" (神と旋律, God and Melody), "Noborenai Sakamichi" (登れない坂道, The Hill I Could Never Climb) and "Kagami no Sekai niwa Watashi shika Inai -another version-" (鏡の世界には私しかいない-another version-, Alone in the Looking-Glass World -another version-). The lyrics for all of the songs were written by SCA-DI. The music was composed by Matsumoto Fuminori under the alias "szak", ryo from Supercell, Pixelbee, and H.B Studio. Matsumoto was also in charge of composing the opening song and the ending songs The Final Smile and Cursed Life/Blessed Life, while Pixelbee composed the other ending songs.

Wonderful Everyday contains many intertextual references to a variety of philosophical and literary works, including Tractatus Logico-Philosophicus by Ludwig Wittgenstein, Alice in Wonderland by Lewis Carroll, Cyrano de Bergerac by Edmond Rostand, Critique of Pure Reason by Immanuel Kant, Steppenwolf by Hermann Hesse, and many others. This proved to be a challenge for the TLWiki translation group, as the translation's main editor herkz was involved in cross-referencing the English versions of many of these titles with the translators' interpretations of their appearances in the text. It was said by one of the translators, vvav, that as SCA-DI's interpretation of Tractatus Logico-Philosophicus carried some of the greatest narrative significance, it is sometimes believed to be "required reading" for fully understanding the story, prompting them to research Wittgenstein's body of work for the project. Vvav also said that SCA-DI had made the challenging philosophical concepts driving the narrative accessible to general audiences, making it easier for them to comprehend when translating the game. However, vvav also admitted that, while they put in an "honest effort to be realistic with myself" about parts of the story that they needed to do more research for, as they lacked formal higher education in the fields of philosophy and literature, it was entirely possible that some errors had been made.

On June 15, 2012, it was made public by TLWiki that a fan translation was in the works. Three years later, it was announced that the translation was complete and was being edited. The team was later contacted by Frontwing to negotiate acquisition of the translation to be released officially. A Kickstarter campaign, announced by Frontwing during their panel at the 2017 Anime Expo, was planned to fund the production of a limited physical release and other merchandise. It was originally slated to launch on July 12 of that year, but was delayed and instead commenced on August 2, 2017, with a goal of $80,000 and stretch goals of $120,000 and $180,000 to fund an English translated artbook and new scenario content by SCA-DI that, it was said, would have released in the summer of 2018. The Kickstarter campaign reached its goal on August 6 and ended on August 27, with an ultimate total of $105,928, though it continued to receive additional pledges through slacker backers via BackerKit. The game was released on Steam on August 30, 2017, with newly redrawn higher resolution assets. Due to Valve's prohibition of adult content on the platform and its importance in the narrative of the title, it was decided they would release a censored version of the first chapter on Steam, and a free patch that readers could download to unlock the rest of the content. The adult content patch released fully uncensored, save for a brief scene depicting bestiality which Frontwing said had been cut due to legal concerns, although no text was removed due to this. Concerning Subahibi's international release, SCA-DI expressed that he was nervous on account of the extreme nature of its content, but that he would be very happy if it was able to lead to his other works getting localizations as well.

On July 20, 2018, an updated rerelease suffixed "Full Voice HD Edition" was released in Japan. This new version featured new art, menus, and a newly designed user interface, and added voice acting for every character, as only one male character was voiced before, and used the higher-resolution assets included in the English release the previous year. It also contained a brand-new short scenario called "Knockin' on Heaven's Door." This version's additional content has not received any official release in other regions. On December 25, 2020, KeroQ released the "10th Anniversary Special Edition," a complete collection containing the Full Voice HD Edition of Subarashiki Hibi, the original Tsui no Sora, and an all-new remake of Tsui no Sora featuring new art and a dramatically revised and expanded script.

== Reception ==
Wonderful Everyday won the gold prize in the scenario category of the Moe Game Awards 2010, as well as the bronze prize in the overall category.

The game also made a good showing in the 2010 PC game rankings on Getchu.com, a popular online Japanese games shop. It ranked second place overall as well as first place in the Scenario and Music categories, and 3rd in Graphics. Additionally, Yuki Minakami was voted the 4th best character from games of that year.

Writing for Hardcore Gamer, Marcus Estrada gave a positive review, praising the story's complexity and the quality of the artwork, however they noted that a significant portion of the game constituted an "absolute madhouse of cruel imagery." Although the title came strongly recommended with a 4.5/5 score, and an encouragement to go in knowing as little as possible, readers were cautioned to "steel themselves" and "be prepared for anything" on account of the extremity of the content within.
