= Monster (2023 Japanese film) =

2023 film directed by Hirokazu Kore-eda

- Theatrical release poster
- Kanji: 怪物
- Revised Hepburn: Kaibutsu
- Directed by: Hirokazu Kore-eda
- Written by: Yuji Sakamoto
- Produced by: Hirokazu Kore-eda; Minami Ichikawa; Kenji Yamada; Megumi Banse; Taichi Itō; Hijiri Taguchi
- Starring: Sakura Andō; Eita Nagayama; Sōya Kurokawa; Hinata Hiiragi; Yūko Tanaka
- Cinematography: Ryuto Kondo
- Edited by: Hirokazu Kore-eda
- Music by: Ryuichi Sakamoto
- Production companies: Gaga; Toho; Fuji Television Network; AOI Pro; Bun-Buku
- Distributed by: Gaga; Toho
- Release dates: 17 May 2023 (Cannes); 2 June 2023 (Japan)
- Running time: 125 minutes
- Country: Japan
- Language: Japanese
- Box office: US$20.7 million

Monster (Japanese: 怪物, Hepburn: Kaibutsu; lit. Monster) is a 2023 Japanese coming-of-age psychological drama mystery thriller film directed, co-produced, and edited by Hirokazu Kore-eda from a screenplay written by Yuji Sakamoto. It stars Sakura Andō as a mother who confronts a teacher after noticing disturbing changes in her son's behavior. The film marks the first time Kore-eda has directed a film he did not write himself since Maborosi (1995). This was the last scoring project by Ryuichi Sakamoto, who died two months before its release; the film is dedicated to his memory.

Monster had its world premiere at the 76th Cannes Film Festival on 17 May 2023, where it competed for the Palme d'Or and was honored with the Queer Palm and the Best Screenplay award. The film was released in Japan on 2 June 2023. It received widespread critical acclaim with special praise for its screenplay, direction, acting, editing and musical score and appeared in many lists of top ten "best of the year".

== Plot ==
Saori Mugino is a single mother raising her fifth grade son, Minato. He soon begins exhibiting strange behavior such as cutting his own hair and coming home with only one shoe. One night, Minato does not come home at all and after calling around, Saori finds him in an abandoned train tunnel. Saori begins to suspect that her son's teacher, Mr. Hori, is abusing him and confronts the school about it. She is treated coldly by the faculty, culminating in Hori making a disingenuous apology. When she confronts Hori directly, he asserts that Minato is actually bullying another student named Yori. Saori visits Yori's house and he, despite his own strange behavior, seems fond of and concerned for Minato. Hori is eventually fired from the school, but returns days later and Minato falls down a flight of stairs trying to escape from him. Hori later comes to Saori and Minato's house during a rain storm, but Saori finds that Minato has gone missing.

A flashback returns to the beginning of the film from Hori's point of view. He notices Minato exhibiting disruptive behavior, such as throwing other students' belongings around the classroom and seemingly locking Yori in a bathroom stall. Hori too visits Yori's house, where he discovers that his father, Kiyotaka, is an abusive alcoholic. When Saori begins inquiring about her son, the faculty pressure Hori to let them handle it to protect the reputation of the school, ultimately requiring him to resign. After he is hounded by journalists and left by his girlfriend, Hori returns to the school to confront Minato, and contemplates jumping from the roof of the school after the boy falls down the stairs. During the rainstorm, Hori notices a pattern in Yori's old homework that seems to spell out Minato's name. Realizing the two boys were actually in love, Hori rushes to the Mugino household to apologize and assure him nothing is wrong with him. When Saori tells him Minato is missing, they go to the train tunnel to find him. They find an abandoned railcar nearly buried in mud, but only see Minato's poncho inside.

A final flashback begins from Minato's point of view. Yori is routinely picked on by the other boys for his asocial and seemingly effeminate behavior. Yori plays with Minato's hair, which the latter then impulsively cuts off. The two boys grow close, but Minato acts harshly toward Yori in the presence of other bullies. Hori confuses Minato's behaviors for bullying. As the two become closer, Minato is distressed that his feelings are becoming romantic and that he is not a worthy son to his deceased father. One night when he goes to Yori's house, Yori and Kiyotaka declare that Yori has been "cured", though Yori quickly recants, which incites his father's wrath. The school's headmistress, coming to terms with her involvement in her grandchild's death, encourages Minato to choose happiness. During the rainstorm, Minato finds Yori fully clothed in his bathtub, covered in bruises, and the two escape to the abandoned railcar, which has become their hideout. After the rain subsides, they emerge from the bottom of the railcar and question whether they have been reborn, and run through a field together. In the distance, a path the two wanted to take earlier that was gated off is now gate-free, with no wreckage in sight.

== Cast ==
- Sakura Andō as Saori Mugino, a single mother
- Eita Nagayama as Michitoshi Hori, Minato and Yori's homeroom teacher
- Sōya Kurokawa as Minato Mugino, Saori's son
- Hinata Hiiragi as Yori Hoshikawa, Minato's classmate
- Mitsuki Takahata as Hirona Suzumura, Hori's lover
- Akihiro Kakuta as Humiaki Shoda, the vice-principal of the elementary school that Minato and Yori attend
- Shidō Nakamura as Kiyotaka Hoshikawa, Yori's father and a single father
- Yūko Tanaka as Makiko Fushimi, elementary school principal

== Production ==
=== Development ===
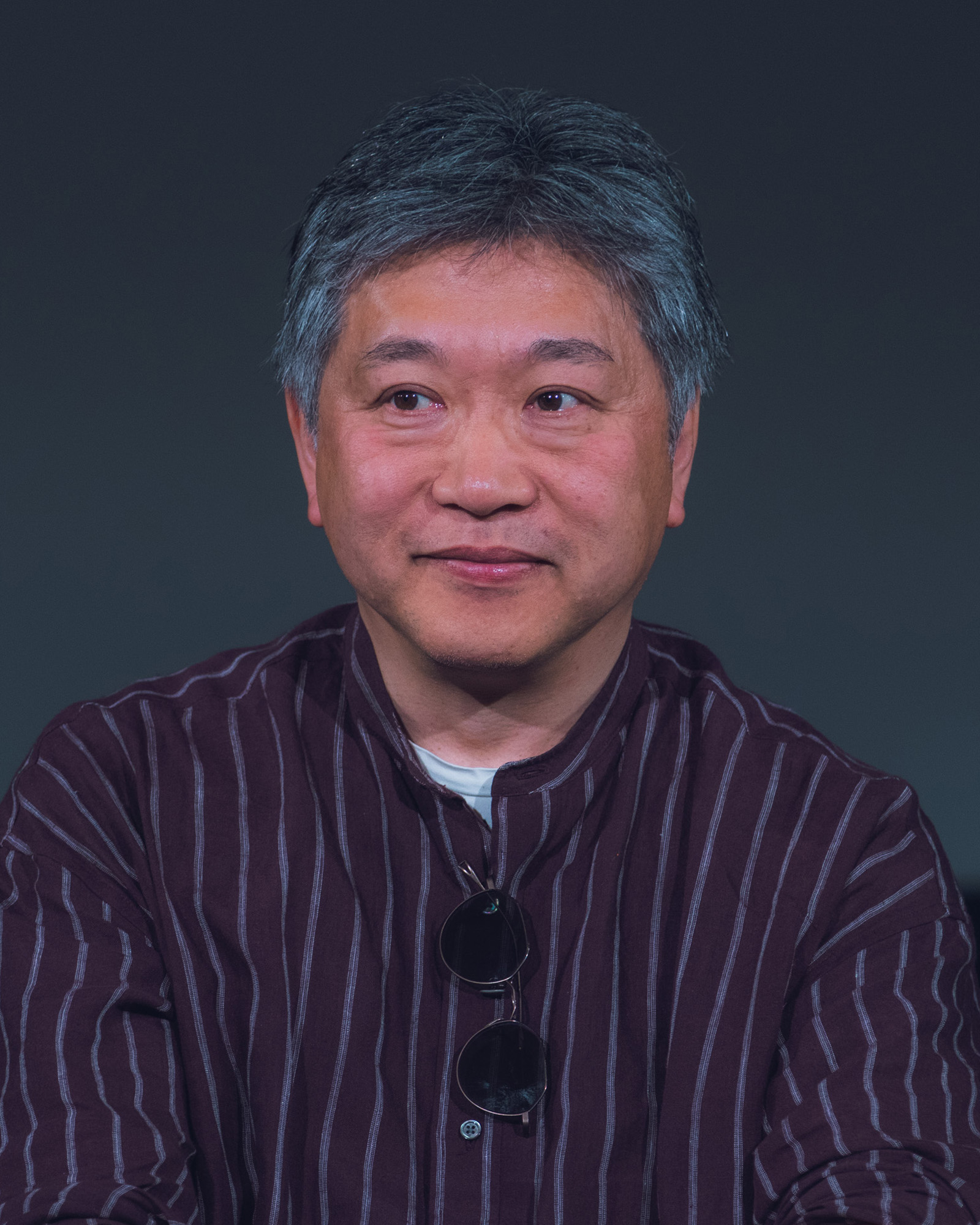
Hirokazu Kore-eda (2025)

For Hirokazu Kore-eda, Monster is the first Japanese-language film he has directed since the international success of Shoplifters (2018), which won the Palme d'Or at the 2018 Cannes Film Festival and was nominated for the Academy Award for Best Foreign Language Film at the 91st Academy Awards. In between, he shot two feature films: the English- and French-language The Truth (2019) and the Korean-language Broker (2022). Initial information about the project became known in November 2022 after filming had concluded. At this point, Monster was in post-production. For the first time since his feature film debut Maboroshi (1995), Kore-eda was not responsible for the screenplay. The script was written by the successful Japanese television writer Yuji Sakamoto. Kore-eda described Sakamoto as the one writer he had always wanted to collaborate with but that he gave up thinking it would happen. Kore-eda said that he felt a sense of closeness with Sakamoto for their shared interest in the same motifs. He described feeling "both envy and in awe of his ability to develop a subject in such a tremendously interesting way." Sakamoto described Kore-eda as the "world's best screenwriter" and recalled looking up to him when the two filmmakers attended the same school and occasionally rubbed shoulders.

Sakura Andō, Eita Nagayama and Yūko Tanaka were cast in the lead roles along with the two child actors Sōya Kurokawa and Hinata Hiiragi. The director had previously worked with Andō on Shoplifters. The two child actors were selected after repeated auditions. Kore-eda praised them for their shared on-camera chemistry, which contrasted the apparent differences in their facial appearances and personalities.

The prolific filmmaker and best-selling author Genki Kawamura served as the film's lead producer. Kawamura previously worked with Kore-eda in producing his Netflix series The Makanai: Cooking for the Maiko House (2023). Kenji Yamada served alongside Kawamura as a producer. The production was financially supported by the companies Toho, Gaga Corporation, Fuji Television Network, AOI Pro and Kore-eda's company Bun-Buku.

=== Filming ===
Filming took place at approximately 25 locations in the Suwa region of Nagano Prefecture (Suwa, Okaya, Fujimi and Shimosuwa), from 19 March to 12 May and 23 July to 13 August 2022. Approximately 700 local elementary school students participated as extras. The former Suwa City Johoku Elementary School, which was used as a shooting location, was depicted as "Johoku Elementary School".

=== Music ===
Ryuichi Sakamoto committed to produce music for the film. However, Sakamoto did not have the physical strength to accept the offer to create an entire score. At the direct request of the director, he submitted two piano pieces. He used pieces from his 2023 album 12, and old pieces to compose the whole. In a commentary, Sakamoto stated that the film deals with an "esoteric theme" and that it was difficult to discern who the eponymous "monster" was. According to Kore-eda, the collaboration with Sakamoto was a "longtime wish that finally came true". During filming and editing, he listened to Sakamoto's music in his hotel room. Sakamoto died on 28 March 2023 after a long battle with cancer.

== Release ==
A teaser trailer was published in early January 2023. A promo was shown in February 2023 at Berlinale's European Film Market. Monster was selected to compete for the Palme d'Or at the 2023 Cannes Film Festival, where it had its world premiere on 17 May 2023. It was also invited at the 28th Busan International Film Festival in 'Gala Presentation' section and was screened on 7 October 2023.

In Japan, the film was released on 2 June 2023, co-distributed by Gaga Corporation and Toho. Gaga has the distribution rights for the rest of Asia. Goodfellas will handle international sales excluding Asia. Well Go USA Entertainment acquired the U.S. distribution rights and gave the film a limited theatrical release beginning 22 November 2023 in New York, followed by 1 December in Los Angeles, before expanding wide on 15 December. Nathan Studios distributed the film in the Philippines on 11 October 2023.

== Reception ==
=== Critical response ===
On the review aggregator website Rotten Tomatoes, 97% of 170 critics' reviews are positive, with an average rating of 8.2/10. The website's consensus reads: "Gently devastating in its compassion, Monster is a masterpiece of shifting perspectives that surprises to the end." Metacritic, which uses a weighted average, assigned the film a score of 79 out of 100, based on 40 critics, indicating "generally favorable" reviews.

Reviewing the film following its Cannes premiere, Peter Bradshaw of The Guardian awarded it 4 out of 5 stars, deeming it "a film created with a great moral intelligence and humanity." Vox's Alissa Wilkinson praised Kore-eda's mastery of directing children's performances.

Monster received criticism from queer writers and scholars in Japan, particularly with regard to the marketing, in which the queer themes of the film were concealed and considered spoilers (until it won the Queer Palm at Cannes), and the ending, which the critics saw as perpetuating the film trope of victimizing queer characters. In March 2024, The Asahi Shimbun published a dialogue between two of the critics, Mizuki Kodama and Rio Tsuboi, and Kore-eda. In it, Kore-eda said he intended the ending to be one in which Minato and Yori choose life, and directed it as a celebration of their being alive. He said he had anticipated that "about 20 percent" of the audience would interpret it as a depiction of an afterlife, which he acknowledged was "undeniably" an underestimation and might have been "naïve".

=== Accolades ===
Award	Date of ceremony	Category	Recipient(s)	Result	Ref.
Asia Pacific Screen Awards	3 November 2023	Best Youth Film	Monster	Nominated	
Asian Film Awards	10 March 2024	Best Director	Hirokazu Kore-eda	Won	
Asian Film Awards	10 March 2024	Best Screenplay	Yuji Sakamoto	Nominated	
Asian Film Awards	10 March 2024	Best Production Design	Keiko Mitsumatsu	Nominated	
Blue Ribbon Awards	8 February 2024	Best Film	Monster	Nominated	
Blue Ribbon Awards	8 February 2024	Best Director	Hirokazu Kore-eda	Nominated	
Blue Ribbon Awards	8 February 2024	Best Supporting Actress	Yūko Tanaka	Nominated	
Blue Ribbon Awards	8 February 2024	Best Newcomer	Sōya Kurokawa	Won	
Blue Ribbon Awards	8 February 2024	Best Newcomer	Hinata Hiiragi	Nominated	
British Independent Film Awards	3 December 2023	Best International Independent Film	Hirokazu Kore-eda, Yuji Sakamoto, Genki Kawamura, Kenji Yamada, Megumi Banse, Taichi Ito, and Hijiri Taguchi	Nominated	
Cannes Film Festival	27 May 2023	Palme d'Or	Hirokazu Kore-eda	Nominated	
Cannes Film Festival	27 May 2023	Queer Palm	Hirokazu Kore-eda	Won	
Cannes Film Festival	27 May 2023	Best Screenplay	Yuji Sakamoto	Won	
Chicago International Film Festival	22 October 2023	Gold Q-Hugo	Monster	Won	
Indiana Film Journalists Association	17 December 2023	Best Foreign Language Film	Monster	Nominated	
Japan Academy Film Prize	8 March 2024	Best Film	Monster	Nominated	
Japan Academy Film Prize	8 March 2024	Best Director	Hirokazu Kore-eda	Nominated	
Japan Academy Film Prize	8 March 2024	Best Film Editing	Hirokazu Kore-eda	Nominated	
Japan Academy Film Prize	8 March 2024	Best Actress	Sakura Ando	Won	
Japan Academy Film Prize	8 March 2024	Best Music	Ryuichi Sakamoto	Nominated	
Japan Academy Film Prize	8 March 2024	Best Cinematography	Ryūto Kondō	Nominated	
Japan Academy Film Prize	8 March 2024	Best Lighting Direction	Eiji Oshita	Nominated	
Japan Academy Film Prize	8 March 2024	Best Art Direction	Keiko Mitsumatsu and Hyeon Seon-seo	Nominated	
Japan Academy Film Prize	8 March 2024	Best Sound Recording	Kazuhiko Tomita	Nominated	
Japan Academy Film Prize	8 March 2024	Newcomer of the Year	Sōya Kurokawa	Won	
Japan Academy Film Prize	8 March 2024	Newcomer of the Year	Hinata Hiiragi	Won	
Mainichi Film Awards	14 February 2024	Best Film	Monster	Nominated	
Mainichi Film Awards	14 February 2024	Best Director	Hirokazu Kore-eda	Nominated	
Mainichi Film Awards	14 February 2024	Best Screenplay	Yuji Sakamoto	Nominated	
Mainichi Film Awards	14 February 2024	Best Supporting Actress	Yūko Tanaka	Nominated	
Mainichi Film Awards	14 February 2024	Best New Actor	Sōya Kurokawa	Nominated	
Mainichi Film Awards	14 February 2024	Best New Actor	Hinata Hiiragi	Nominated	
Mainichi Film Awards	14 February 2024	Best Cinematography	Ryūto Kondō	Nominated	
Mainichi Film Awards	14 February 2024	Best Art Direction	Keiko Mitsumatsu	Nominated	
Mainichi Film Awards	14 February 2024	Best Music	Ryuichi Sakamoto	Nominated	
Mainichi Film Awards	14 February 2024	Best Sound Recording	Kazuhiko Tomita	Nominated	
Munich Film Festival	1 July 2023	ARRI/OSRAM Award for Best Film	Hirokazu Kore-eda	Nominated	
Nikkan Sports Film Awards	27 December 2023	Best Film	Monster	Nominated	
Nikkan Sports Film Awards	27 December 2023	Best Director	Hirokazu Kore-eda	Nominated	
Nikkan Sports Film Awards	27 December 2023	Best Actress	Sakura Ando	Nominated	
Nikkan Sports Film Awards	27 December 2023	Best Newcomer	Hinata Hiiragi	Nominated	
San Diego Film Critics Society	19 December 2023	Best Foreign Language Picture	Monster	Nominated	
San Sebastián International Film Festival	30 September 2023	Sebastiane Award	Hirokazu Kore-eda	Nominated	
Seattle Film Critics Society Awards	8 January 2024	Best International Film	Monster	Nominated	
Seattle Film Critics Society Awards	8 January 2024	Best Youth Performance	Sōya Kurokawa	Nominated	
Stockholm International Film Festival	17 November 2023	FIPRESCI Award	Monster	Won	
Sydney Film Festival	18 June 2023	Best Film	Monster	Nominated	
