= Shylock's Children =

- Author: Jun Ikeido
- Language: Japanese
- Genre: Mystery fiction
- Publisher: Bungeishunjū
- Publication date: January 30, 2006
- Publication place: Japan
- Pages: 305
- ISBN: 978-4-16-324630-7
- Website: Bungeishunjū

Shylock's Children is a Japanese mystery and economic novel by Jun Ikeido, published in book form by Bungeishunjū on January 30, 2006. The book was published in paperback on November 10, 2008.

From 2003 to 2004, six stories were serialized in the financial and sales magazine "Kindai Sales" (Kindai Sales Co., Ltd.), and seven to ten stories were added and published in book form.

Author Jun Ikeido is a former bank employee and the author of many novels set in banks. This work is one of them. Jun Ikeido is best known as the author of popular Japanese TV drama series Hanzawa Naoki. Hanzawa Naoki was also a drama set in a bank, but according to Ikeido, this monumental work that defined his novel writing style is Shylock's Children, he said.

Shylock is the greedy merchant in William Shakespeare's The Merchant of Venice.

This work was dramatized for Television by Wowow in October 2022 and made into a movie in February 2023, distributed by Shochiku.

== Synopsis ==
The setting is the Nagahara Branch of Tokyo Daiichi Bank. One day, a million yen goes missing from the bank. A female employee, Airi Kitagawa, is suspected, but her boss, Masahiro Nishiki, who was protecting Airi, disappears. In addition, Takuji Endo, a co-worker, becomes mentally ill, and all hell breaks loose in the bank. The relationships among the employees at the bank become complicated. The protagonist changes from story to story, including a branch manager who has worked his way up from the bottom, a female office worker in love within the company, and a dull section chief, whose crimes come to light as the reader progresses. What is the truth behind the incident?

== Characters ==
=== Tokyo Daiichi Bank, Nagahara Branch ===
Kazuo Furukawa
He is an assistant manager. He harasses his subordinates for his own career advancement.
Masahiro Nishiki
Deputy Manager of the Sales Section. He is trusted by his subordinates.
Airi Kitagawa
A female bank employee. Suspected as the culprit in a cash-loss case.
Makoto Takino
An ace employee in the Operations Department who always achieves top grades.
Takuji Endo
He becomes mentally ill from his stressful and pressured job as a banker.

== Bibliographic Information ==
- Book: Published January 30, 2006 ISBN 978-4-16-324630-7 312 pages
- Paperback: Published November 07, 2008 ISBN 978-4-16-772803-8 352 pages

== Television Drama ==
It was broadcast and distributed in the "Serial Drama W" slot on Wowow Prime and Wowow On Demand from October 9 to November 6, 2022. Starring Yoshihiko Inohara. A total of five episodes were broadcast. This ensemble drama depicts the happiness and difficulties of working and living an ordinary life through the organization of a bank. The story depicted how characters with various circumstances were involved in the cash loss case.

=== Charactors (TV drama) ===
Masahiro Nishiki by Yoshihiko Inohara
Deputy manager of the sales section. Although he is off the career track, he is well-liked by his subordinates. One day, he suddenly disappears.
Airi Kitagawa by Nanase Nishino
A subordinate of Nishiki. She puts much of her salary into the family budget to support her financially strapped family. She is falsely accused in a cash-loss case.
Makoto Takino by Shigeaki Kato
Assistant Manager of the Operations Section. He is always at the top of his class and is doing well in his private and public life.

=== Staff (TV Drama) ===
- Original Story - Shylock's Children (Bungeishunjū) by Jun Ikeido
- Screenplay - Yoichi Maekawa
- Director - Kosuke Suzuki
- Music - Hideakira Kimura
- Hair & Make-up: Kanako Nishimura
- Planning/Producer: Yasunori Aoki
- Producers: Mako Hirose, Setsuko Uchimaru
- Production - Wowow, Tohan Kikaku

=== Broadcast Schedule ===
| Ep. | Date |
|---|---|
| episod0 | October 9, 2022 |
| episode1 | October 16, 2022 |
| episode2 | October 23, 2022 |
| episode3 | October 30, 2022 |
| episode4 | November 6, 2022 |

=== Related products ===
- DVD/Blu-ray Released on 29 September, 2023 by Happinet
  - DVD: (BIBJ-9087)/Blu-ray: (BIXJ-9086)
  - The film includes a stage greeting at the completion announcement preview and a collection of TV spots as video extras.

== Film ==
A film adaptation was released on February 17, 2023, distributed by Shochiku. It starred actor Sadao Abe. The film is an original story that unfolds differently from both the original novel and the TV drama, with its own unique characters.

In the original story, the protagonist of the story changes one after another and Nishiki goes missing in the middle of the story, but in the film version, Nishiki became the main character and played the role of finding out the truth of the case to the end. The film also added an original character, Hajime Sawasaki (acted by Akira Emoto), a guest with a strong personality.

The film was released on Friday, February 17, 2022. According to the weekend movie attendance ranking announced by Kogyo Tsushinsha, it recorded 172,000 attendance and 226 million yen in box-office revenue in the first three days. By the 27th, the film had attracted 420,000 viewers and grossed 543 million yen, and on the 27th, Sadao Abe, the star of the film, gave a big hit thank-you speech on stage.

The film was nominated Best Screenplay, Best Actor and Best Supporting Actress at 47th Japan Academy Film Prize.

=== Evaluation ===
On the film review site Kinema Junpo Web, film journalist Koremasa Uno criticized the film, saying that the direction of the film was problematic and did not bring out the best in the actors, and that the veteran actors' performances were what held the film together. On the other hand, film critic Reiko Kitagawa said that although the bank financial scandal the film deals with has no impact in itself, she enjoyed watching it because of the anticipation that the smiling lead actor, Sadawo Abe, is going to do something. Film journalist Ryo Kitaura found the interplay between veteran actor Sadao Abe and Akira Emoto very interesting, and recognized that the story had themes common to Jun Ikeido's works, which was a good thing.

=== Synopsis (Movie) ===
Masahiro Nishiki is a veteran customer service representative at the Nagahara Branch of Tokyo Daiichi Bank. One day, one million yen in cash goes missing in the branch. While a manhunt is underway for the culprit, Nishiki's subordinate, Airi Kitagawa, is suspected, but it turns out to be a false accusation by a female co-worker who had a grudge against her. The bank is full of peculiar people with various circumstances. As Nishiki, together with Airi and his subordinate Yoji Tabata, investigates behind the scenes of the cash loss incident at the bank, they come to an unbelievable truth.

=== Charactors (Movie) ===
Masahiro Nishiki by Sadao Abe
Veteran Customer Relations at Tokyo Daiichi Bank, Nagahara Branch. He is heavily in debt because he co-signed for his brother and is being pursued by debt collectors.
Airi Kitagawa by Aya Ueto
A female employee at the Nagahara Branch of Tokyo Daiichi Bank. She works hard to support her financially strapped family. When she is framed for a cash-loss case, she decides to look for the real culprit.
Yoji Tabata by Yuta Tamamori
Young bank employees. Fed up with his power-harassing boss, he secretly hopes to change jobs to a foreign bank. Together with Nishiki and Airi, he searches for the truth behind the cash loss incident.
Kaoru Kujo by Toshiro Yanagiba
Manager at Tokyo Daiichi Bank, Nagahara Branchi. He came to Nagahara branch off the career track.
Kazuo Furukawa by Tetta Sugimoto
Assistant Manager at Tokyo Daiichi Bank, Nagahara Branchi. He immediately shouts at his subordinates in a loud voice and delegitimizes them. Power harassment boss.
Makoto Takino by Ryuta Sato
Assistant Manager, Customer Service Department. He has excellent sales performance and is expected by others. He has a wife and a daughter.
Michiharu Kuroda by Kuranosuke Sasaki
Inspection Department. He comes to the Nagahara branch to investigate a case of missing cash.
Hajime Sawasaki by Akira Emoto
An eccentric old man whom Nishiki met at a tavern.
Kouichi Ishimoto by Isao Hashizume
President of a real estate company. A client of Takino.

=== Award (Movie) ===
| Award | Category | Name | Result |
|---|---|---|---|
| 47th Japan Academy Film Prize | Best Actor | Sadao Abe | Nominated |
| 47th Japan Academy Film Prize | Best Supporting Actress | Aya Ueto | Nominated |
| 47th Japan Academy Film Prize | Best Screenplay | Michio Tsubaki (Note: Michio Tsubaki was revealed to be the pen name of the original author, Jun Ikeido.) | Nominated |

=== Related product ===
- DVD/Blu-ray released on September 8, 2023 by Shochiku
  - Special edition (Full-length movie and bonus video disc)
    - The bonus disc includes a making-of featurette and event footage from the film.
  - Regular edition (Full-length movie)
