= Märchen Crown =

Japanese manga

- First tankōbon volume cover

メルヘンクラウン (Meruhen Kuraun)
- Genre: Fantasy; Romance
- Manga
- Written by: Aka Akasaka (story); Aoi Kujira (composition)
- Illustrated by: Azychika
- Published by: Shueisha
- Imprint: Young Jump Comics
- Magazine: Weekly Young Jump
- Original run: March 19, 2025 – November 19, 2026
- Volumes: 5
- icon

Märchen Crown (Japanese: メルヘンクラウン, Hepburn: Meruhen Kuraun) is a Japanese manga series written by Aka Akasaka (story) and Aoi Kujira (composition) and illustrated by Azychika. It was serialized in Shueisha's seinen manga magazine Weekly Young Jump from March 2025 to November 2026.

== Plot ==
Rapunzel is a girl who lives in a tall tower towering over the deep forest. A young man called Mikel stumbles upon her, takes her out of the tower—which she has longed to escape—and guides her to his village. Rapunzel's fantasy of a "happily ever after", however, is quickly shattered when she sees the outside world, and finds that the beautiful world she longed for is instead plagued by monstrous beings called "Cursed People", who are parasitic creatures covered in thorns and plants. Mikel, her savior, is also partially cursed.

The series then turns into a large-scale war story where these re-imagined "Princesses and Princes" (like Cinderella) fight for survival and to become the "King of the People".

== Publication ==
Written by Aka Akasaka (story) and Aoi Kujira (composition) and illustrated by Azychika, Märchen Crown was serialized in Shueisha's seinen manga magazine Weekly Young Jump from March 19, 2025, to November 19, 2026. Shueisha has collected its chapters into individual tankōbon volumes, with the first one released on October 17, 2025. As of October 19, 2026, five volumes have been released.

Shueisha is simultaneously publishing the manga in English on its Manga Plus digital platform.

=== Volumes ===
No.	Release date	ISBN
1	October 17, 2025	978-4-08-893791-5
1. "Everlasting Happiness" (いつまでも幸せに, Itsu made mo Shiawase ni); 2. "The World You Longed For" (あこがれの世界, Akogare no Sekai); 3. "The Curse" (呪い, Noroi); 4. "A Prince on a White Horse" (白馬の王子様, Hakuba no Ōji-sama); 5. "Monster" (化け物, Bakemono); 5. "The Hazy Forest" (霧の森, Kiri no Mori); 6. "Escape Journey" (逃避行, Tōhikō); 7. "Wanderers" (さすらいの人, Sasurai no Hito); 8. "The Northern Country" (北の国, Kita no Kuni)
2	November 19, 2025	978-4-08-893882-0
9. "The Iron Shoes" (鉄の靴, Tetsu no Kutsu); 10. "First Night" (初めての夜, Hajimete no Yoru); 11. "Breadcrumbs" (パンの屑, Pan no Kuzu); 12. "The Candy House" (お菓子の家, Okashi no Ie); 13. "Hunger" (飢え, Ue); 14. "The Oven's Heat" (竈の熱, Kamado no Netsu); 15. "A Battle of Wills" (意志の戦い, Ishi no Tatakai); 16. "Love and Despair" (愛と絶望, Ai to Zetsubō); 17. "The Thing That Connects Us" (二人を繋ぐもの, Futari o Tsunagu mono); 18. "The Red Thread" (赤い糸, Akai Ito); 19. "The Poisoned Apple" (毒林檎, Doku Ringo)
3	February 19, 2026	978-4-08-894129-5
4	June 18, 2026	978-4-08-894283-4
5	October 19, 2026	978-4-08-894405-0

=== Chapters not yet in tankōbon format ===
These chapters have yet to be published in a tankōbon volume.

26. "The Silent Woods" (静かな森, Shizuka na Mori)
27. "Faded Footsteps" (消えた足跡, Kieta Ashiato)
28. "Moonlit Secret" (月下の秘密, Gekka no Himitsu)
29. "The False King" (偽りの王, Itsuwari no Ō)

== See also ==
- Record of Ragnarok, another manga series illustrated by Azychika
