= Samayou Yaiba =

- Film Poster
- Directed by: Shouichi Mashiko
- Written by: Keigo Higashino
- Produced by: Kenji Yamada
- Starring: Akira Terao; Yutaka Takenouchi; Miki Sakai; Shirō Itō
- Music by: Kenji Kawai
- Distributed by: Toei
- Release date: October 10, 2009
- Country: Japan
- Language: Japanese
- Box office: $5,111,040

Samayou Yaiba (さまよう刃) is a 2009 Japanese film directed by Shouichi Mashiko and produced by Toei based on the novel, Samayou Yaiba (2004) by Keigo Higashino. The film is also known under the English title The Hovering Blade.

== Plot ==
The only daughter of widower Nagamine Shigeki (Terao Akira), an architect, is found dead. A few days later, Nagamine gets an anonymous phone call giving him the names and address of the perpetrators. Upon entering the said apartment, Nagamine finds a snuff video in which two young men rape and kill his daughter. He waits for the murderer to return home, and stabs him to death.

Nagamine then heads out of the city to Nagano to find the other youth in the video, writing a long letter to the police about why he killed the boy in the apartment, and his intention to do the same to the other murderer when he finds him. In the letter he specifically cites the Japanese laws that fail to punish under-age criminals. This letter also is sent to the press, and is published in newspapers across the country.

While in Nagano, Nagamine tracks down the murderer. During his lengthy journey, he touches a number of people with varying opinions about the validity of his quest, including the Tokyo policemen investigating his case, and a father-daughter family unit who own an inn in which he takes refuge.
