= Oshi no Ko =

Japanese manga series and its adaptations

- First tankōbon volume cover, featuring Ai Hoshino

【推しの子】
- Genre: Drama; Mystery; Supernatural
- Manga
- Written by: Aka Akasaka
- Illustrated by: Mengo Yokoyari
- Published by: Shueisha
- English publisher: NA: Yen Press
- Imprint: Young Jump Comics
- Magazine: Weekly Young Jump
- Original run: April 23, 2020 – November 14, 2024
- Volumes: 16
- Television drama
- Directed by: Hana Matsumoto; Smith
- Written by: Ayako Kitagawa
- Music by: Fox Capture Plan
- Licensed by: Amazon Prime Video
- Original run: November 28, 2024 – December 5, 2024
- Episodes: 8
- Live-action film

Oshi no Ko: The Final Act
- Directed by: Smith
- Produced by: Ryūsuke Imoto
- Written by: Ayako Kitagawa
- Music by: Fox Capture Plan
- Released: December 20, 2024
- Runtime: 129 minutes
- Anime television series
- Oshi no Ko (2023–present)
- icon

Oshi no Ko (【推しの子】) (Note: Interpreted as "My Favorite Idol's Children".) is a Japanese manga series written by Aka Akasaka and illustrated by Mengo Yokoyari. It was serialized in Shueisha's Weekly Young Jump from April 2020 to November 2024, with its chapters collected in 16 tankōbon volumes. It follows a doctor and his recently deceased patient who were reborn as twins to a famous Japanese pop idol, as they navigate the highs and lows of the country's entertainment industry while growing up together. It has been licensed for release in North America by Yen Press and is simultaneously published by Shueisha on their Manga Plus platform.

An anime television series adaptation, produced by Doga Kobo, aired its first 11-episode season from April to June 2023. A second 13-episode season aired from July to October 2024. A third season aired from January to March 2026. A fourth and final season has been announced.

By December 2025, Oshi no Ko had over 25 million copies in circulation.

== Plot ==
Gorou Amamiya, an obstetrician-gynecologist and admirer of the pop idol Ai Hoshino, is entrusted with the confidential delivery of her children. On the night of the birth, he is murdered by an obsessive fan of Ai's and is reincarnated as her son, Aquamarine "Aqua" Hoshino, retaining all memories of his past life. Unbeknownst to him, his fraternal twin sister, Ruby Hoshino, is the reincarnation of Sarina Tendōji, a deceased patient of Gorou's who also admired Ai. Four years later, Ai is murdered before the twins' eyes by the same fan who killed Gorou. Though the fan subsequently commits suicide, Aqua deduces their biological father may have been an accomplice and resolves to infiltrate the entertainment industry to find and exact revenge upon him.

Twelve years later, the twins are high school students adopted by Miyako Saitō, the head of Ai's former talent agency, Strawberry Productions. Ruby pursues her dream of becoming an idol, forming a new group named B-Komachi with actress Kana Arima and YouTuber Mem-cho, while Aqua returns to acting. Aqua leverages his growing network, including a strategic friendship with actress Akane Kurokawa, to further his investigation. During a stage production, he discovers a shared paternity with his co-star, Taiki Himekawa, whose father died by suicide before Ai's murder. Through Akane's research, Aqua later identifies the actor Hikaru Kamiki as their likely father and the mastermind behind the killings. Concurrently, while filming a music video, Ruby discovers Gorou's corpse, learning the truth of his murder and fueling her own desire for vengeance. These parallel discoveries intensify the twins' grudges, but their increasingly manipulative methods to reach Hikaru create a rift between them, culminating in a loss of trust after Aqua deliberately leaks their connection to Ai to the media.

With the assistance of director Taishi Gotanda, Aqua writes an autobiographical screenplay based on Ai's life, titled 15 Years of Lies, intending to lure Hikaru out. Ruby aggressively secures the lead role. During production, a meeting with her previous life's mother, who is a film sponsor, forces a confrontation with her past; this encounter also leads to Aqua and Ruby realizing each other's true reincarnated identities. At the film's debut, Aqua finally makes contact with Hikaru, who confesses to using Ai as an emotional crutch and, in a fit of despair after she left him, manipulating the fan to target her. Aqua reveals Ai's final message, in which she expressed her hope that Hikaru would learn to love himself and that she would have grown to love him in time.

Hikaru claims he intends to surrender to authorities, but instead manipulates Nino, a former member of Ai's B-Komachi, into attempting to murder Ruby. The attempt is thwarted by Miyako's husband, Ichigo, and Akane. Aqua then confronts Hikaru, who reveals his desire to immortalize Ai's beauty by killing anyone who might surpass her. Believing Ruby will never be safe while Hikaru lives and willing to sacrifice his own future, Aqua stabs himself and commits a murder–suicide with Hikaru by throwing them both off a cliff. He succeeds in drowning Hikaru but succumbs to his own wounds, finding final solace in having protected his sister rather than merely achieving revenge.

In the aftermath, Hikaru's crimes are publicly exposed, and his accomplices are arrested. The film is released as a tribute to Aqua, as his friends struggle to cope with his loss and seek new purpose. Ruby, now an idol who embodies the same radiant spirit as Ai, performs at a tribute concert. Though she—like her mother—must conceal her pain behind a performative smile, she finds genuine happiness in her career, thanking her late mother and brother for lighting her path and asking them to watch over her.

== Development ==
=== Writing ===
Aka Akasaka considered writing a story about being reincarnated as an idol's child, a well-known joke in Japan often used after news of an idol's marriage is revealed. He later began hearing complaints about the entertainment industry through streamers and working on the live-action film adaptation of his previous manga Kaguya-sama: Love Is War. He decided that it was the right time to create a story about the entertainment industry and used his previous idea. When he started writing, Akasaka had already decided on the plots of the first and final acts. Manga about the entertainment industry typically focuses on traditional forms of entertainment, such as films, dramas, and plays. However, the industry saw significant change with the rise of the internet. Akasaka, therefore, decided to include more contemporary themes in the manga. Oshi no Ko debuted in Weekly Young Jump on April 23, 2020; at the time, Kaguya-sama: Love Is War was still running in the same magazine, leading to two manga series created by Aka Akasaka being serialized simultaneously. After the end of Kaguya-sama: Love Is War, a new manga series Renai Daikō (恋愛代行), written by Akasaka and illustrated by Nishizawa 5mm, started its serialization in the same magazine on April 27, 2023, again leading to two manga series created by Akasaka being serialized simultaneously.

Akasaka did extensive research into the Japanese entertainment industry while writing Oshi no Ko. He talked to many different types of entertainers, from idols to managers to YouTubers. In an interview with Anime News Network, he highlighted the many differences between the industry in Japan and the United States, such as the lack of unions. He was inspired to portray the idol world in a dark light after becoming friends with an entertainer who was attacked by a fan. While the entertainer came across as "tough", they confessed to him that they were badly hurt emotionally from this encounter, leading Akasaka to realize that entertainers hid their true feelings for the sake of their careers and fans. Akasaka said: "I want people to know how young talents are being hurt, exploited, and suffering. I think that this work also asks the question of how people should deal with and treat those talents."

Many of the stories in Oshi no Ko are based on pieces of real-life events. Akasaka stated that he considered his fundamental writing style to be that of Oshi no Ko and that the comedy in Kaguya-sama originated as a request from the editorial department. However, he included similar humor in Oshi no Ko to make it easier to read. When writing, Akasaka sometimes became fond of certain characters and gave them larger roles in the plot, like in Mem-cho's case.

=== Art ===
When Akasaka came up with the concept for Oshi no Ko, he immediately contacted artist Mengo Yokoyari as Yokoyari had dealt with the entertainment industry in her one-shot Kawaii before. The two had long been acquainted but had never worked together. When designing characters, Akasaka usually sends a rough sketch to the person in charge of the storyboards. He sometimes allowed Yokoyari to draw the designs as she pleased. The only time they changed a character design was when one of the characters looked too much like the real-life person they were modeled after.

== Media ==
=== Manga ===
Oshi no Ko, written by Aka Akasaka and illustrated by Mengo Yokoyari, started in Shueisha's seinen manga magazine Weekly Young Jump from April 23, 2020, to November 14, 2024. Shueisha has collected its chapters in 16 individual tankōbon volumes, released from July 17, 2020, to December 18, 2024.

In April 2022, Shueisha began publishing the series in English on the Manga Plus website and mobile app. In July 2022, at Anime Expo, Yen Press announced that they licensed the series for an English release. The first volume was released on January 17, 2023. As of April 28, 2026, 13 volumes have been released.

=== Anime ===
An anime television series adaptation, produced by Doga Kobo, aired its first season from April 12 to June 28, 2023, on Tokyo MX and other networks. A second season aired from July 3 to October 6, 2024. A third season aired from January 14 to March 25, 2026. A fourth and final season was announced after the airing of the eleventh episode of the third season.

=== Novels ===
A spin-off novel written by Hajime Tanaka, titled Oshi no Ko: Spica of the First Star (【推しの子】 ～一番星のスピカ～, Oshi no Ko Ichibanboshi no Supika), was released on November 17, 2023. Yen Press has licensed the novel and released it on July 8, 2025. The novel focuses on the events of the prologue prior to Ai's murder, with Ai herself as the primary focus character.

A second novel written by Tanaka, titled Oshi no Ko: Étude for Two (【推しの子】 ～ふたりのエチュード～, Oshi no Ko Futari no Etude), was released on December 18, 2024. Yen Press has licensed it. It tells the past and future of actresses Kana and Akane, thus being both a spin-off and a sequel of the original story.

=== Live-action ===
In January 2024, it was announced that the series would receive a television drama adaptation, distributed exclusively worldwide by Amazon Prime Video in the same year, and a live-action film adaptation distributed by Toei. It was directed by Hana Matsumoto and Smith, with scripts written by Ayako Kitagawa, and music composed by Fox Capture Plan. The first six episodes of the Oshi no Ko live-action series premiered on November 28, 2024, while episodes 7 and 8 premiered on December 5. Each episode features a different theme song: "Akuma" (アクマ; "Devil") by My First Story (episode 1); "Sōsō Fuitsu" (草々不一; "Sincerely Yours") by Rokudenashi (episode 2); "Orange Youth" (オレンジユース, Orenji Yūsu) by Da-ice (episode 3); "Past Die Future" by I's (episode 4); "Ee Gana" (ええがな; "It'll Be Fine") by Yabai T-Shirts Yasan (episode 5); "Ranran Rhapsody" (爛々ラプソディ, Ranran Rapusodi; "Blazing Rhapsody") by Wanima (episode 6); "Ugoku Ten P" (動く点P; "Moving Point P") by Wednesday Campanella (episode 7); and "Revenge" by Umeda Cypher (episode 8).

Directed by Smith, the film Oshi no Ko: The Final Act featured the same writer and composer from the series. It premiered on December 20, 2024. The film's ending theme is "Shining Song" by B-Komachi. In Australia, the film was distributed by Sugoi Co, with a fan premiere on January 28, 2025, and a theatrical release on January 30. Amazon Prime Video added the film to its catalog in the United States in June 2025.

=== Video game ===
A smartphone puzzle video game based on the series was announced on February 2, 2025. Titled Oshi no Ko: Match Star (Oshi no Ko: Puzzle Star (【推しの子】Puzzle Star) on Japanese platforms), it was developed and globally published outside of Japan by the Korean company NHN Corporation in partnership with Kadokawa Corporation and was released in Japan for iOS and Android devices on February 25, 2026. An English version was released on November 18, 2026.

== Reception ==
=== Popularity ===
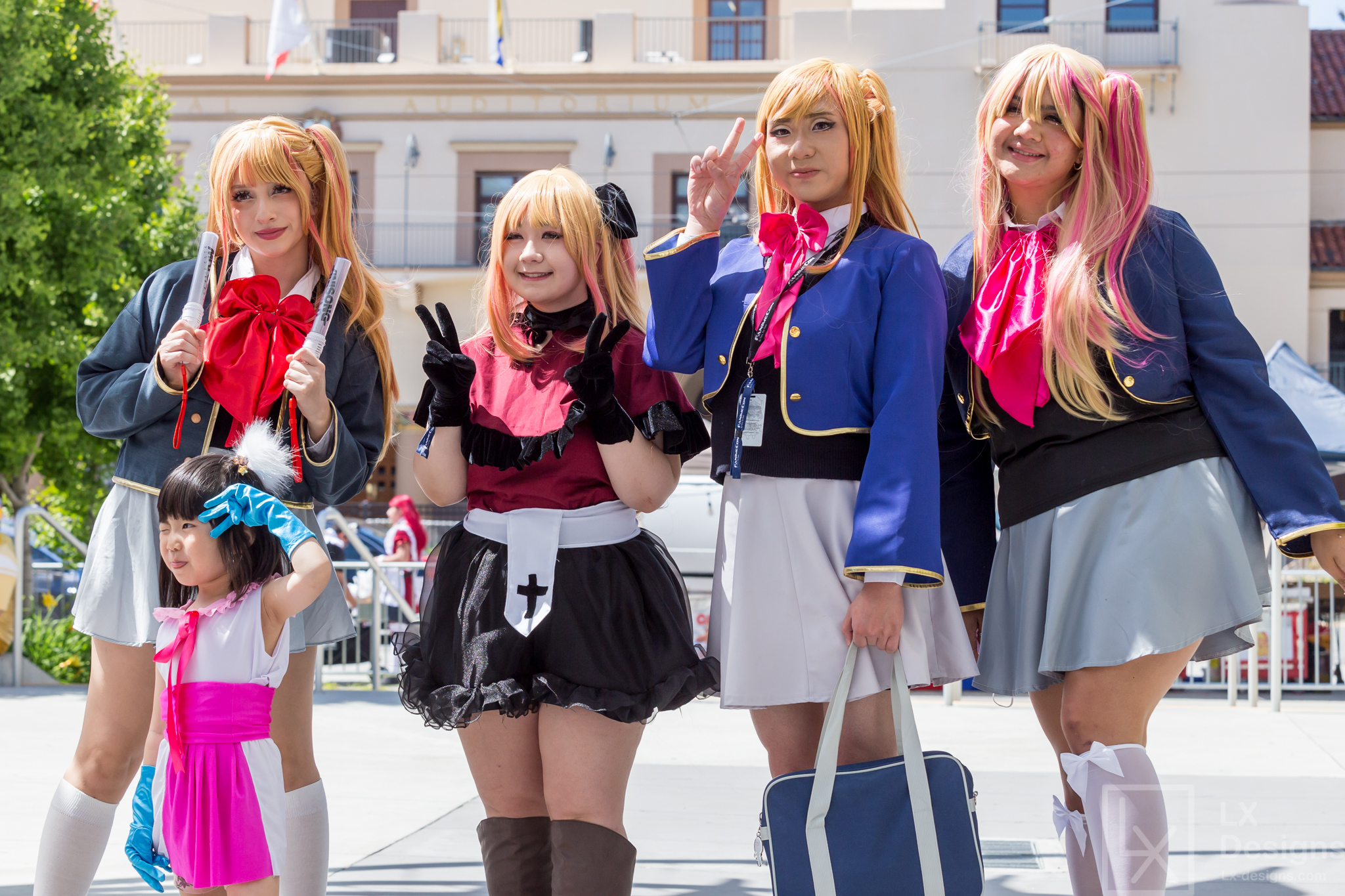
Fans cosplaying as Ruby Hoshino from the series

Oshi no Ko ranked eleventh on Takarajimasha's Kono Manga ga Sugoi! list of best manga of 2021 for male readers; it ranked seventh on the 2022 list. The series ranked fourth on the "Nationwide Bookstore Employees' Recommended Comics of 2021" by the Honya Club website. The series ranked thirteenth on the 2021 "Book of the Year" list by Da Vinci magazine; it ranked 25th on the 2022 list; fifth on the 2023 list; and fifteenth on the 2024 list.

According to a 2023 poll conducted by education and publishing company Benesse, which asked 18,802 third to sixth-grade Japanese children (12,859 girls, 4,728 boys and 1,215 others), Ai Hoshino ranked third below the "friend" and "mother" on the top 10 most admired people. According to the survey, Ai's singing and dancing ability, cuteness, positivity, idol talent, and compassion for others were the reasons why she ranked higher.

The live-action series adaptation achieved a record-breaking number of domestic viewers for an Amazon Prime original in Japan within its first 30 days of release.

=== Sales ===
By April 2021, Oshi no Ko had over 1 million copies in circulation; it had over 3 million copies in circulation by October 2022; over 5 million copies in circulation by March 2023; over 8 million copies in circulation by May 2023; over 12 million copies in circulation by July 2023; over 14 million copies in circulation by October 2023; over 15 million copies in circulation by November 2023; over 18 million copies in circulation by July 2024; over 20 million copies in circulation by November 2024; and over 25 million copies in circulation by December 2025.

Volumes 10–12 were among the best-selling manga volumes of 2023. The first volume of the series ranked second on the BookWalker's top 10 best-selling manga titles in 2023. Volume 13 was Shueisha's eighth highest first print run manga volume of 2023–2024 (period from April 2023 to March 2024), with 500,000 copies printed; volume 16 had an initial print run of 550,000 copies printed, making it the publisher's seventh highest first print run manga volume of 2024–2025 (period from April 2024 to March 2025).

In North America, the volumes of Oshi no Ko were ranked on Circana (formerly NPD) BookScan's monthly top 20 adult graphic novels list since June 2023. The series was Yen Press' third best-selling manga and was first amongst manga titles that debuted that year.

=== Critical reception ===
Reception towards the manga's ending has been controversial among fans, which Akasaka has warned about a month in advance. Although he and illustrator Mengo Yokoyari wanted to see fans hotly discussing it, many fans were still disappointed by the ending chapters of the story, complaining about the rushed nature of the final chapters and its "excessive and poorly written bad development", which allegedly rejected all the positive development of the characters before. Aka Akasaka has stated in an interview that the ending was planned from the very beginning and expressed satisfaction that he was able to "end things exactly the way he wanted."

Game Rant's Stormie McNeal noted that while the ending could indeed be considered rushed, she did not find it entirely terrible, as the protagonist Aqua still achieved a resolution to his journey—albeit in a somewhat controversial manner. Screen Rant's Joshua Fox also noted that the ending of the manga was not the worst it could receive and, in the opinion of the author, did not make the entire story worthless. However, he did say that it still deserved its criticism from fans and critics that it received due to the anti-climactic ending, the lack of resolution in many of the subplots, and contradiction to its main story themes.

=== Accolades ===
Oshi no Ko was nominated for the 14th Manga Taishō in 2021 and placed fifth with 59 points; it was nominated for the 15th edition in 2022 and placed eighth with 49 points. In August 2021, Oshi no Ko won the Next Manga Award in the print category. The manga was nominated for the 67th Shogakukan Manga Award in the general category in 2021. It was nominated for the 26th Tezuka Osamu Cultural Prize in 2022; it was nominated for the 28th edition in 2024; and the 29th edition in 2025. It was also nominated for the 46th Kodansha Manga Award in the general category in 2022; it was nominated for the 48th edition in the same category in 2024.

Oshi no Ko was nominated for Best Suspense Manga at the 2023 Japan Expo Awards.

== See also ==
- Not Your Idol, a manga series with a similar plot by Aoi Makino
- Perfect Blue, an anime film with a similar theme directed by Satoshi Kon
- Reincarnation in popular culture
