= Love Agency =

Japanese manga series

- First tankōbon volume cover

恋愛代行 (Renai Daikō)
- Genre: Romantic comedy
- Manga
- Written by: Aka Akasaka
- Illustrated by: Nishizawa 5mm
- Published by: Shueisha
- English publisher: Shueisha (digital)
- Imprint: Young Jump Comics
- Magazine: Weekly Young Jump
- Original run: April 27, 2023 – June 6, 2024
- Volumes: 4

Love Agency (恋愛代行, Renai Daikō) is a Japanese manga series written by Aka Akasaka and illustrated by Nishizawa 5mm. It was serialized in Shueisha's seinen manga magazine Weekly Young Jump from April 2023 to June 2024, with its chapters collected in four tankōbon volumes.

== Publication ==
Written by Aka Akasaka and illustrated by Nishizawa 5mm, Love Agency was serialized in Shueisha's seinen manga magazine Weekly Young Jump from April 27, 2023, to June 6, 2024. The series' chapters were collected in four tankōbon volumes from November 17, 2023, to August 19, 2024. Shueisha began publishing the manga in English on its Manga Million digital platform in 2026.

No.	Release date	ISBN
1	November 22, 2023	978-4-08-893004-6
2	February 19, 2024	978-4-08-893146-3
3	May 17, 2024	978-4-08-893286-6
4	August 19, 2024	978-4-08-893352-8

== Reception ==
The series was nominated in the 2024 eBookJapan Manga Award.
