= Harem Marriage =

Japanese manga series

- First tankōbon volume cover, featuring Koharu Date

ハレ婚。 (Hare-Kon)
- Genre: Romantic comedy
- Manga
- Written by: NON
- Published by: Kodansha
- English publisher: NA: Kodansha USA (digital)
- Magazine: Weekly Young Magazine
- Original run: July 23, 2014 – March 19, 2022
- Volumes: 20
- Television drama
- Directed by: Takashi Ninomiya; Kana Yamada
- Written by: Kana Yamada
- Original network: ABC
- Original run: January 16, 2022 – March 13, 2022
- Episodes: 9
- icon

Harem Marriage (Japanese: ハレ婚。, Hepburn: Hare-Kon) is a Japanese manga series written and illustrated by NON. It was serialized in Kodansha's seinen manga magazine Weekly Young Magazine from July 2014 to March 2022, with its chapters collected in 20 tankōbon volumes. A nine-episode television drama adaptation was broadcast from January to March 2022.

== Plot ==
Koharu finds that her boyfriend was a married man, who was cheating on his wife with her, and was the third guy to do so in a row. Desolate, Koharu decides to leave Tokyo and move back home, rejecting a future of love and marriage for a simpler life. However, once she arrives, she discovers that the café that her parents ran is closed and they are heavily in debt. A man, Ryunosuke Date, who was following Koharu, offers her to pay their debt, but Koharu has to marry him. Koharu learns that her hometown has legalized polygamous marriages to counter declining birth rates and becomes Ryunosuke's third wife.

== Characters ==
Koharu Date (伊達 小春, Date Koharu)
Portrayed by: Haruka Shimazaki
Koharu Date (née Maezono (前園)) is the 22-year-old third wife of Ryunosuke. To save her family's home and café, she marries Ryunosuke and becomes his third wife. Koharu is short-tempered and often lashes out at slight annoyances. She was at first against polygamy and sexual intimacy due to past trauma caused by her exes, but she gradually resolves her issues as she comes to terms with her feelings for Ryunosuke, begins to get along with his other wives and becomes a bonding pillar in the Date family.
Ryunosuke Date (伊達 竜之介, Date Ryūnosuke)
Portrayed by: Yu Inaba
Ryunosuke Date is the 25-year-old husband of Yuzu, Madoka and Koharu. He is a former celebrity pianist and is unemployed due to quitting the stage because of anxiety. He is greedy and is not willing to settle for less than what he desires, including his three wives whom he wants all at once.
Yuzu Date (伊達 柚子, Date Yuzu)
Portrayed by: Yurina Yanagi
Yuzu Date (née Ōtsu (大津)) is the 26-year-old first wife of Ryunosuke and is also the daughter of the town mayor who legalized polygamy. She has a typical gyaru look, but despite her appearance, she does the majority of the domestic chores in the Date family and is a good cook. She is the mother of Ryunosuke's first child, Rinnosuke.
Madoka Date (伊達 まどか, Date Madoka)
Portrayed by: Nana Asakawa
Madoka Date (née Saijō (西條)) is the 21-year-old second wife of Ryunosuke. She often wears a kimono at home. Although she is the second wife, she has been with Ryunosuke the longest. She manages the family's financial allocations and spending habits. Madoka is the most jealous amongst Ryunosuke's wives and yearns the most for exclusivity with him.

== Media ==
=== Manga ===
Written and illustrated by NON, Harem Marriage was serialized in Kodansha's seinen manga magazine Weekly Young Magazine from July 23, 2014, to June 17, 2019. Kodansha collected its chapters in 19 tankōbon volumes, released from November 6, 2014, to August 6, 2019. An epilogue mini series, subtitled O Kawari (おかわり; 'Seconds!'), ran for eight chapters in Weekly Young Magazine from January 17 to March 19, 2022, and was collected in a single tankōbon volume (numbered as the 20th in the overall series), released on May 6 of that same year.

Kodansha USA published the 20 manga volumes digitally in English from January 5, 2021, to December 10, 2024.

==== Volumes ====
No.	Original release date	Original ISBN	English release date	English ISBN
1	November 6, 2014	978-4-06-382534-3	January 5, 2021	978-1-64659-895-3
2	December 5, 2014	978-4-06-382543-5	February 23, 2021	978-1-64659-972-1
3	April 6, 2015	978-4-06-382589-3	March 23, 2021	978-1-63699-015-6
4	July 6, 2015	978-4-06-382624-1	April 27, 2021	978-1-63699-063-7
5	October 6, 2015	978-4-06-382674-6	May 25, 2021	978-1-63699-106-1
6	November 6, 2015	978-4-06-382695-1	June 22, 2021	978-1-63699-162-7
7	February 5, 2016	978-4-06-382728-6	July 27, 2021	978-1-63699-242-6
8	June 6, 2016	978-4-06-382798-9	August 24, 2021	978-1-63699-307-2
9	September 6, 2016	978-4-06-382846-7	September 28, 2021	978-1-63699-374-4
10	December 6, 2016	978-4-06-382892-4	October 26, 2021	978-1-63699-424-6
11	March 6, 2017	978-4-06-382930-3	November 23, 2021	978-1-63699-473-4
12	June 6, 2017	978-4-06-382974-7	December 28, 2021	978-1-63699-533-5
13	September 6, 2017	978-4-06-510142-1	January 25, 2022	978-1-63699-570-0
14	December 6, 2017	978-4-06-510542-9	February 22, 2022	978-1-63699-623-3
15	March 6, 2018	978-4-06-511094-2	March 22, 2022	978-1-63699-663-9
16	June 6, 2018	978-4-06-511646-3	April 26, 2022	978-1-68491-143-1
17	October 5, 2018	978-4-06-513150-3	May 24, 2022	978-1-68491-179-0
18	June 6, 2019	978-4-06-516133-3	June 28, 2022	978-1-68491-232-2
19	August 6, 2019	978-4-06-516732-8	July 26, 2022	978-1-68491-365-7
20	May 6, 2022	978-4-06-527804-8	December 10, 2024	979-8-89478-160-0

=== Drama ===
In October 2021, it was announced that the manga would be adapted into a television drama. The series is directed by Takashi Ninomiya and Kana Yamada, with Yamada also writing scripts for the series. It was broadcast for nine episodes on ABC from January 16 to March 13, 2022. The theme song is "Final Piece", performed by Hyde.

== Reception ==
By October 2021, the manga had over 2.6 million copies in circulation. In 2018, the manga was nominated for the 42nd Kodansha Manga Award in the general category.

== See also ==
- Delivery Cinderella, another manga series by the same author
- Adabana, another manga series by the same author
