= Aka Akasaka =

Japanese manga artist (born 1988)

Aka Akasaka 赤坂 アカ
- Born: August 29, 1988 (age 38) Sado, Niigata, Japan
- Areas: Manga artist, writer
- Notable works: Kaguya-sama: Love Is War; Oshi no Ko
- Awards: Shogakukan Manga Award

Aka Akasaka (赤坂 アカ, Akasaka Aka; born August 29, 1988) is a Japanese manga artist and writer known for his series Kaguya-sama: Love Is War and Oshi no Ko.

== Biography ==
Akasaka contributed to the background assets of the visual novel video game Wonderful Everyday, released in Japan in 2010. His series Kaguya-sama: Love Is War was serialized in Shueisha's Miracle Jump between May 2015 and January 2016, and was then transferred to Weekly Young Jump starting from March 2016. It was the 9th best selling manga in Japan in 2019, with over 4 million copies sold. In 2020, he won the 65th Shogakukan Manga Award in the general category with the manga. Starting from April 2020, his work Oshi no Ko, which is illustrated by Mengo Yokoyari, is serialized in Weekly Young Jump and is his second active series on the magazine at the same time. In August 2021, Oshi no Ko won the Next Manga Award in the print category.

Following the end of Kaguya-sama, Akasaka announced on November 3, 2022, that he would retire from drawing manga to instead focus on writing.

In April 2023, Akasaka launched a new manga, Renai Daikō, which is illustrated by Nishizawa 5mm.

== Works ==
=== Manga ===
- Sayonara Piano Sonata (さよならピアノソナタ) (2011–2012, story by Hikaru Sugii, character design by Ryō Ueda)
- Ib: Instant Bullet (ib －インスタントバレット－) (2013–2015)
- Kaguya-sama: Love Is War (かぐや様は告らせたい ～天才たちの恋愛頭脳戦～) (2015–2022)
- Oshi no Ko (【推しの子】) (2020–2024, illustrated by Mengo Yokoyari)
- Renai Daikō (恋愛代行) (2023–2024, illustrated by Nishizawa 5mm)
- Märchen Crown (メルヘンクラウン) (2025–2026, storyboard composition by Aoi Kujira, illustrated by Azychika)
- CRBR: Crazy Raccoon Battle Royale (2025–present, storyboard composition by Hiromono, illustrated by Andou)
- Karubi, Momareru (かるび、もまれる。) (2025–present, concept by Akami Karubi, story by Akasaka and Shiromanta, illustrated by Shiromanta)

=== Video games ===
- Wonderful Everyday (2010, background assets)

== Awards and nominations ==
Year	Award	Category	Nominee(s)	Result	Ref.
2015	Next Manga Award	Manga I Want to Sell in the Future	Ib: Instant Bullet	13th place	
2017	Next Manga Award	Print Manga	Kaguya-sama: Love Is War	Won	
2020	Shogakukan Manga Award	General Manga	Kaguya-sama: Love Is War	Won	
2020	BookWalker Awards	Grand Prize	Kaguya-sama: Love Is War	Won	
2021	Manga Taishō	—	Oshi no Ko	5th place	
2021	Next Manga Award	Print Manga	Oshi no Ko	Won	
2022	Shogakukan Manga Award	General Manga	Oshi no Ko	Nominated	
2022	Tezuka Osamu Cultural Prize	Grand Prize	Oshi no Ko	Nominated	
2022	Manga Taishō	—	Oshi no Ko	8th place	
2022	Kodansha Manga Award	General Manga	Oshi no Ko	Nominated	
