= Mikeneko Homuzu no Kishido =

- Box art
- Publisher: Ask Kodansha
- Platform: Game Boy
- Release: JP: February 15, 1991
- Genre: Adventure

Mikeneko Homuzu no Kishido (Note: Japanese: 三毛猫ホームズの騎士道; lit. The Chivalry of Holmes the Calico Cat) is a 1991 mystery-themed adventure game for the Game Boy. It is based on a novel by Japanese mystery writer Jiro Akagawa in his Calico Cat series. The game involves the detective Yoshitaro Katayamam, his sister and their cat Holmes as they travel to Germany to solve a mystery that occurred in a castle three years earlier.

Mikeneko Homuzu no Kishido was released on February 15, 1991 and was the first adventure game for the Game Boy. Reviewers in Japanese video game magazines Famicom Tsūshin and Hippon Super! complimented the story and background graphics in the game, with some reviewers in the former magazine suggesting that the designs of the characters were not on the same level. One reviewer from each magazine found trouble with the play control and password system in the game.

== Gameplay ==
Gameplay in Mikeneko Homuzu no Kishido. The cursor has a letter on it showing which character is interacting with the screen.

Mikeneko Homuzu no Kishido is a mystery-themed adventure game. The player chooses between two characters to solve mysteries. The player can take on the role of either Yoshitaro or Harumi and can change characters anytime during gameplay. Depending on which character they choose, a cursor appears on the screen with a Y for Yoshitaro and an H for Harumi. The cursor determines the actions on the screen. A menu can be brought up during gameplay and execute actions.

== Plot ==
The game is set in a castle near Germany's Romantic Road. One day, Tomomi, the wife of Hideya Nagae, the new owner of the castle, was murdered by being thrown into an iron maiden. Three years later, Hideya gathered those involved at the castle. The case is set to be solved by Detective Yoshitaro Katayama of the Tokyo Metropolitan Police Department along with his younger sister Harumi Katayama and their pet cat Holmes.

== Development ==
The original story of the game is by the Japanese author Jiro Akagawa. Akagawa wrote the first novel in the Calico Cat series in 1978, which went on to have over 20 novels published. Several of his works have been adapted to other media, such as the film Sailor Suit and Machine Gun (1981) and the Family Computer game Akagawa Jirou no Yuurei Ressha (1991). The game features renditions of compositions by Johann Sebastian Bach.

== Release and reception ==
Reception

Review scores
Publication	Score
Famitsu	6/10, 6/10, 7/10, 4/10
Hippon Super!	8/10

Mikeneko Homuzu no Kishido was released in Japan for the Game Boy on February 15, 1991. It became the first mystery-themed adventure game released for the system.

Four reviewers commented on the game in the Japanese video game magazine Famicom Tsūshin, "cross-review" complimented the graphics, with one reviewer praising how the entire screen scrolls. Another said that while they were impressed by the graphics, they would have loved to it on a bigger screen and in color. While complimenting the background graphics, one reviewer wished that Holmes the cat was depicted as being more cute. A reviewer in Hippon Super! found that the character models are slightly inferior to the background art.

Three reviewers complimented the theme and story of the game, complimenting the unique setting and generally interesting narrative. Another reviewer highlighted that it was enjoyable as there were no particularly cruel puzzles. Lexus Misaki, in a separate review, said in the complimented the game for its brisk pace.

One reviewer in Famicom Tsūshin said the controls were confusing and inconsistent. While the Hippon Super! reviewer found the password system for returning to the game to be frustrating.

== See also ==
- Japanese detective fiction
- List of Game Boy games
