= List of Say I Love You episodes =

- Cover of the second Blu-ray volume released by StarChild in Japan on January 23, 2013.
- No. of episodes: 13 + 1 OAD

Release
- Original network: Tokyo MX
- Original release: October 6 – December 29, 2012

Say I Love You. is a 2012 romance Japanese anime based on the manga written and illustrated by Kanae Hazuki. Mei Tachibana is a socially awkward teenager who not only believes that friendships end in betrayal, but has also never had a boyfriend in all of her 16 years of existence. One day she has a fateful encounter with the most popular boy at her high school, Yamato Kurosawa, when she kicks him straight in the palm of his hand and bruises him. Despite this, an intrigued Yamato embarks on a campaign to get to know Mei better. The story follows Mei and the new experiences she undertakes as she slowly allows Yamato to get closer to her, including becoming his girlfriend and making new friends along the way with Yamato's help.

The anime is produced by Zexcs and directed by Toshimasa Kuroyanagi, with series composition by Takuya Satō, character designs by Yoshiko Okuda, art direction by Yuka Hirama, and soundtrack music by Yuuji Nomi. The series premiered on October 6, 2012, on Tokyo MX, with later airings on Chiba TV, tvk, Sun TV, KBA, TV Aichi, TVh, AT-X, and BS11. The thirteen-episode series was followed by an OAD episode on July 24, 2013. The series was picked up by Crunchyroll for online simulcast streaming in North America and other select parts of the world. The Anime Network later obtained the series for streaming in an English dub. StarChild released the series in Japan on six Blu-ray and DVD volumes between December 26, 2012, and May 22, 2013. The anime was licensed by Sentai Filmworks for distribution via select digital outlets and a home media release in North America. The series was also acquired by Hanabee Entertainment for release in Australia.

The opening theme is "Friendship (for Say I Love You)." (Friendship ~for 好きっていいなよ。) by Ritsuko Okazaki. The ending theme is "Slow Dance" by Suneohair. "Sarari" (さらり; "Without Hesitation") by Suneohair is used as the insert song of episode 12.

== Episode list ==
No.	Official English title (Note: All English titles are taken from Sentai Filmworks.) Original Japanese title	Original air date (Note: As Say "I love you". premiered in Tokyo MX's Saturday 25:00 (01:00 am JST) time slot, the episodes technically aired the days following the ones listed.)	Refs.
1	"We Kissed"; Transliteration: "Kisu o Shita" (Japanese: キスをした)	October 6, 2012	
Mei Tachibana, a 16-year-old high school student, has declined to make any friends due to an incident in middle school where her "friends" falsely accused her of fatally feeding the class rabbit. She has since gone through school without any socializing whatsoever, leading those aware of the incident to bully her further while those unaware dismiss her as edgy. Eventually, one day, she has a set of encounters with Takeshi Nakanishi, a perverted student who accidentally bumps into her in the hallway and then tries to mess with her skirt. Mei, however, mistakenly believes Nakanishi's friend Yamato Kurosawa, the most popular guy in school, was responsible, and proceeds to kick Yamato in the hand in the latter incident. Yamato, however, finds himself intrigued by Mei, and tries to make friends with her. Mei frequently rebuffs him, but after apologizing for kicking him and giving him some bandages, they end up exchanging numbers. Later, after leaving the bakery where she works, an adult man who frequents the bakery begins stalking Mei home. Unable to get ahold of her mother, she reluctantly calls Yamato for help, as he's the only other contact stored on her phone. Arriving at the convenience store where Mei is hiding Yamato wards the stalker away by pretending to be Mei's boyfriend, completing the façade with the pronouncement that he loves her and kisses her. The stalker eventually flees, but Mei remains frozen, as that was her first kiss.
2	"Fried Chicken Flavored"; Transliteration: "Karaage Aji no" (Japanese: 唐あげ味の)	October 13, 2012	
Still flustered by Yamato's kiss, Mei begins fantasizing about him. Despite her jumbled feelings, Mei ends up hanging out with Yamato's friends at a karaoke bar, leading her to get attached to Asami Oikawa, a kind girl in Yamato's friend group. Asami has long been taunted for having voluptuous breasts, but shrugs it off each time. When Mei questions this, Asami reveals that she knew Yamato in middle school, where he protected her from some bullies. Asami subsequently developed feelings for him, and they even shared a kiss, but soon discovered that Yamato thinks little of kissing others and gave up on him. Asami also reveals that Yamato has flippantly kissed nearly every girl in school except for one named Miki Arai, rumored to be his first love. Offended by Yamato's behavior and becoming jealous of Miki, Mei shrugs him off and declines when he invites her to karaoke night again. Not long after, Mei overhears two gyaru talking trash about Asami's breasts and proceeds to insult them, leading them to punch her in the face. Asami takes her to the nurse, only for the girls to follow them there and continue taunting them. Nakanishi – who has long been in love with Asami – overhears them and tries to defend Asami, but accidentally objectifies her more, leading Asami to run away crying. Mei advises Nakanishi to properly convey his feelings to Asami; he does so, touching Asami, and they start dating. Mei then realizes she herself must do the same with Yamato, and rushes over to the karaoke bar. There, Miki tries flirting with Yamato, but he rebuffs her and heads outside, where he encounters Mei. Mei confronts him on his random kissing, so Yamato kisses her several times to make it clear that he is genuinely into her. They too begin dating.
3	"If You Trust Someone..."; Transliteration: "Hito o Shinjireba..." (Japanese: 人を信じれば...)	October 20, 2012	
Mei decides to go get a haircut, but when she tells Yamato her plans, he decides to tag with her and make it their first date, much to her dismay. While walking through town, Mei notices other girls still gawking at him despite her being there, and sees him even get approached by a model agent who he turns down. As Mei is about to question if they are even dating, they meet their schoolmate Aiko Muto along with her boyfriend Masashi Tachikawa. They invite the two to go bowling with them, where Mei turns out to be secretly very skilled. Aiko is shown to secretly have a crush on Yamato, and wonders what he sees in Mei, thinking she is not interested in him. She later takes the time to approach Mei when they are alone, then bluntly tells Mei that she and Yamato have had sex. Shocked by this revelation, Mei flees, only for Yamato to follow her. Aiko later reveals to Tachikawa that earlier when they were in high school, she had severe image problems despite being in a relationship. Yamato ended up telling her that she did not need all that makeup, touching her. Later, after discovering that her boyfriend at the time was cheating on her, she ran crying to Yamato and pleaded with him to have sex with her, and now wonders why he would give that up for someone who seems to show no emotion. Yamato finds Mei, and in order to reconcile, takes her to his old middle school. There he describes how in the past, he would hang around bullies in order to avoid being bullied himself, only for his best friend to become their target. He would still keep seeing the friend, but not do anything against the bullies themselves, leading the friend to move out of town. Yamato asserts that this is an indicator of him having the same demons that Mei has, and this carries over to him being part of the popular crowd, but Mei refutes that by indicating how people genuinely like him because he is kind. They reconcile with a kiss and depart. Later that night, after having sex with Tachikawa, Aiko resolves to not let it end like this.
4	"They Have Scars"; Transliteration: "Kizu ga, Aru" (Japanese: 傷が、ある)	October 27, 2012	
Mei has attracted the attention of Kakeru Hayakawa, a guy known to have slept with many other girls, including Aiko. He then wastes no time in asking Yamato if he can hook him up with Mei for lunch with him. Yamato is unaware that Kakeru has other plans for Mei. When Yamato was distracted by a phone call, he tried to convince her to be his girlfriend, but Mei sensed his motives and leaves him alone in an instant. Yamato learns of what happened, and when Kakeru starts badmouthing Mei, he punched him, saying she is his girlfriend. Later, Yamato catches up with Mei, and confesses to her that he did sleep with Aiko, but only because back then she was heartbroken and lost.
5	"Just Like This"; Transliteration: "Kono mama ga" (Japanese: このままが)	November 3, 2012	
Yamato agrees to take care of the abandoned black kitten he and Mei found by the roadside. One day, he invites her over to his house to introduce Kuro, the black kitten, to Mei's white cat Marshmallow. Mei then gets to meet Nagi, Yamato's younger sister. But as soon as they meet, Nagi immediately disliked Mei because she felt that Mei was stealing Yamato, due to the past she used to have a lot of friends until she realized they were using her and later against her that she stopped going to school for a while, and only Yamato was there to cheer her up. Mei then come and talk with her and they begin to get along with each other. Upon returning after Takeshi asked him to get a gift from him and Asami, Yamato finds Kuro, Marshmallow, Mei and Nagi sleeping together on the couch in his room.
6	"Why"; Transliteration: "Dōshite" (Japanese: どうして)	November 10, 2012	
An amateur model named Megumi Kitagawa transfers to the school where Yamato and Mei goes to. Megumi seems to have fallen for Yamato at first sight, but he has no interest in her. Things escalate when Yamato becomes a part-time male model and partner for Megumi. Mei watches their first photoshoot together and she suddenly begin to feel jealous.
7	"I Really Love You"; Transliteration: "Suki, nanoni" (Japanese: 好き、なのに)	November 17, 2012	
Mei feels even more depressed as the magazine which employs Megumi has asked Yamato to continue to model for them, although she gives her approval. Yamato finds time to text her on the way home from the photo shoot and be with Mei alone, however he is at his modeling job most of the time, and he goes to the photoshoot with Megumi instead of him going home with Mei. Later, Mei notices that Yamato is no longer wearing his bracelet, and a few days later, rumors about Yamato and Megumi going out, and his going to Megumi's house (though, for dinner) reached Mei.
8	"New to Love"; Transliteration: "Ren'ai Shoshinsha" (Japanese: 恋愛初心者)	November 24, 2012	
Yamato realizes that he and Mei haven't gone home together for a long time, and so they do. However, it in a misunderstanding when an indecisive Mei turns Yamato off. Before doing so, Mei stops by her part-time job at the bakery where she meets a customer named Kai Takemura. Mei is shocked when he tries asking about the special edition key chain Asami gave her. Yamato then realize from Aiko that everybody in school know about rumors between him and Megumi, including Mei. He rushed to find Mei walking on the street with her bracelet got broke. Yamato gathers the scattered beads of her bracelet. She bends down to help him, but as their emotions threaten to overwhelm them both, they hug instead.
9	"Each and Every"; Transliteration: "Sorezore no" (Japanese: それぞれの)	December 1, 2012	
Megumi was surprised to hear from Yamato that he is quitting the modeling business because it makes Mei sad. Mei gets to know of Kai's plans to gain revenge against his former tormentors, so she gives him some advice. With his mission of gaining revenge against his bullies looking bleak, Kai, as he declares in front of Yamato, fully turns to another mission: winning Mei's heart.
10	"Nothing Else"; Transliteration: "Hoka ni wa Nani mo" (Japanese: 他には何も)	March 17, 2012	
Megumi continues her quest for Kai by trying to make use of Asami and Aiko to alienate and destabilize Mei (without them knowing it); and Kai in order to break her up with Yamato. Kai notices Mei being in pain and lonely, so he tries to cheer her up by giving the tickets Megumi gave him the other day. Kai scolds Yamato for not sensing that Mei is in pain and is lonely. After hearing Yamato's side, Kai, gains more respect for him despite hating some of his traits.
11	"Parade"; Transliteration: "Parēdo" (Japanese: パレード)	December 15, 2012	
Kai confronts Megumi for pretending to befriend everyone, saying she hates things if she is not the center of attention. Megumi later reads some negative comments about her on the Internet, where she ditches her current photoshoot. After buying some junk food, she later shuts herself in her apartment obviously depressed. Meanwhile, Mei and Yamato go on a date where Nagi also comes after convincing her older brother Daichi to take her there, since she says she wanted to see Mei very much. After going on a few rides, Yamato realizes that Mei is scared but she is trying to be strong and fight those fears. At night, Nagi falls asleep and Yamato brings the two to a hotel.
12	"I'll Protect You"; Transliteration: "Mamotteru yo" (Japanese: 守ってるよ)	December 22, 2012	
Upon arriving at the station, Yamato leaves Nagi in Mei's care and hurries to Megumi's apartment. At the apartment, he meets Momo, Megumi's best friend. Megumi shut herself in her apartment because of the same reason that Mei and Nagi shunned making friends before, and won't come out even if it is Yamato knocking at her door. Seasons pass by, and things become stable for everyone, especially Yamato and Mei. Mei has already gotten out with Yamato and her friends during the summer festival, but on the insistence of her mother, she asks Yamato to watch the fireworks with her, while she will be wearing kimono. Even if Mei arrives late and the fireworks over, it did not matter to Yamato, as he kissed her at the now-empty shrine.
13	"Say (Note: This episode is called simply "Say" by Sentai Filmworks. The episode's title was literally Say, "I love you." in Japan.)" (Japanese: Say "I love you".)	December 29, 2012	
Yamato catches a fever and skips school. Seeing that she's bashful again, Mei's friends urge her to go and see him. However, on the way to Yamato's house the next day, Mei calls Yamato only to hear Nagi's voice, telling her that he does not want to see her today. In reality Nagi wants to pamper Yamato and have him all to herself. After seeing Kai at the bakery, he and Mei later cross paths at their usual meeting spot, as they apologize to each other and spend the rest of the day together afterwards. At the end of the closing credits, Mei is heard saying I love you, conveniently ending the series by fulfilling the title...
OAD	"Someone"; Transliteration: "Dareka ga" (Japanese: 誰かが)	July 24, 2013	
Mei, Aiko, Asami, and Nagi are making cookies at Mei's house. Knowing that the process could take a while, Nagi chases Yamato out of the house. He receives a text from Kai, who asks him if he wants to meet up at the park. When Yamato arrives, it is revealed that the rundown park was where the two of them first talked and bonded for the first time. After bantering a bit, Kai asks Yamato why he, who had always seemed to be having fun with a large crowd around him, was always the first one at the park after school. They start talking, and Kai tells her that he thinks she's cool for staying true to herself while modelling. Megumi snaps back at him, and the offended Kai leaves. At Mei's house, the cookies are done and turn out to be delicious. Yamato hugs Mei and tells her he's glad she's with him. They watch the sunset together before continuing their walk by holding hands.

=== Specials ===
The following special episodes are included on the Blu-ray and DVD volumes of the series. The episodes are titled "Mei and Meowrsmellow" with a few including content-specific titles.

No.	Title	Original release date
1	"Mei and Meowrsmellow 1"	December 26, 2012
Mei stresses over a dream of herself and Yamato attending a meet-up.
2	"Mei and Meowrsmellow 2"	January 23, 2013
Mei tries to imitate Yamato's mannerisms.
3	"Mei and Meowrsmellow 3"	February 27, 2013
Marshmellow meows to the tune of the opening theme, which coincidentally causes Mei to meow as well.
4	"Mei and Meowrsmellow 4"	March 27, 2013
An animation glitch shows Mei as a moving wire-framed character.
5	"Mei and Meowrsmellow 5"	April 24, 2013
Mei mentions the Japanese play on words involving Yamato's black kitten "Kuro", and his last name "Kurosawa".
6	"Mei and Meowrsmellow 6"	May 22, 2013
Marshmewllow tries to teach Kuro the 'laws' of being a cat but they have to pretend to be 'normal cats' when Mei returns.
7	"Mei and Meowrsmellow 7"	TBA
Mei tries to practice singing karaoke. Marshmellow then tries to sing but his bass shatters the mic.
8	"Mei and Meowrsmellow 8"	TBA
Mei tries on 3D glasses and complains of her eyes hurting.
9	"Mei and Meowrsmellow 9"	TBA
Marshmellow expresses his dislike of Yamato but Kuro deeply defends him before escaping Mei's cookie tasting.
10	"Mei and Meowrsmellow 10"	TBA
Mei expresses her thanks to the audience for watching her story with Yamato unfold.

== Home media ==
StarChild released the series in Japan on six Blu-ray and DVD volumes between December 26, 2012, and May 22, 2013. The complete series was released on Blu-ray and DVD volumes by Sentai Filmworks on December 24, 2013. Hanabee Entertainment released the series on February 5, 2014, on DVD format only. These releases contained English and Japanese audio options and English subtitles.

StarChild (Region 2 – Japan)
Vol.	Episodes	BD / DVD Release date	BD Ref.	DVD Ref.
1	1, 2	December 26, 2012		
2	3, 4	January 23, 2013		
3	5, 6	February 27, 2013		
4	7, 8	March 27, 2013		
5	9, 10	April 24, 2013		
6	11, 12, 13	May 22, 2013		

Sentai Filmworks (Region 1 – North America)
Vol.	Episodes	Blu-ray / DVD artwork	BD / DVD Release date	BD Ref.	DVD Ref.
1	1–13	Mei Tachibana & Yamato Kurosawa	December 24, 2013		

Hanabee Entertainment (Region 4 – Australia / New Zealand)
Vol.	Episodes	DVD artwork	DVD Release date	DVD Ref.
1	1–13	Mei Tachibana & Yamato Kurosawa	February 5, 2014	
