= Majo-tachi no Nemuri =

1995 video game

- Super Famicom box art
- Publisher: Pack-In-Video
- Platforms: Super Famicom; Microsoft Windows; PlayStation
- Release: Super Famicom: JP: November 24, 1995; Windows: JP: November 1996; PlayStation: JP: April 15, 1999
- Genre: Visual novel
- Mode: Single player

Majo-tachi no Nemuri (Note: Japanese: 魔女たちの眠り; lit. The Witches' Sleep) (Note: Sometimes known as Majotachi no Nemuri) is a Japanese visual novel first released for the Super Famicom on November 24, 1995. It was based on two works by prolific Japanese mystery author Jirō Akagawa: Majotachi no Tasogare and Majotachi no Nagai Nemuri. The game story is told through text over background graphics and sound effects and music to relate to the story. As the player progresses through the game, they are given points to change the narrative through the protagonist's actions. These actions change the flow of the story. The game has multiple endings and after enough are reached in an act, the option to continue the story becomes available allowing the player to advance further into the story.

The protagonist of Majo-tachi no Nemuri is an ordinary office worker. One day he receives a phone call from a childhood female friend saying "Help Me, I'm Going to be Killed." The next day he travels to the mountain village area where the villagers are constantly fearful of the residents in the valley.

Majo-tachi no Nemuri was initially scheduled for release in mid-1995, and released for the Super Famicom in November. Jugemu listed it as being among the ten best-selling Super Famicom game between the weeks of November 16 to December 15, 1995. New versions of the game were made later for Microsoft Windows-based computers and the PlayStation console. The game received mixed reviews from the round-table of four reviewers in Famicom Tsūshin magazine with the reviewers being split on the quality of the story and how it was presented, the mechanics of repeating through the story to reach new parts of the plot, and how well it compared to other visual novels of the era.

== Gameplay ==
Majo-tachi no Nemuri is a horror-themed sound novel. Mark Kretzschmar and Sara Raffel, authors of The History and Allure of Interactive Visual Novels (2023), described the term used to primarily define Japanese games that rely on graphics and sounds instead of puzzles to tell a story and was more generally interchangeable with visual novels.

Majo-tachi no Nemuri's story is shown through graphics overlaid with text that tells the story and features background music and sound effects. The player can read the story by advancing the text from the controller. They can choose to speed up the pace of the text as well as return backwards to repeat the last few lines. They can also bring up a menu to view the characters in the game and examine an in-game map. Everytime the protagonist meets a character, they are automatically added to the character list.

At certain points in the game, there are parts where the narrative has a chance to branch off. The player can choose the protagonist's action by selecting from options presented on the screen. The choices made effect the scenario. There are multiple endings in Majo-tachi no Nemuri that can occur depending on the player's choices and actions. After reaching an ending, the amount of options at previous narrative branches can increase leading to different ways the story can develop in the game. The game also features an option called "Sequel Scenario". After reaching various endings, an option that previously led to an "End" message may change to a "Continue" message to reach different acts in the story.

== Plot ==
The protagonist of Majo-tachi no Nemuri is an ordinary office worker. One day he receives a phone call from a childhood female friend saying "Help Me, I'm Going to be Killed." (Note: The player can enter their any name for the protagonist and the girl. If left blank, the characters will be named Tsuda and Yoriko respectively.)

The next day, he travels to the mountain village area where the villagers are constantly fearful of the residents in the valley.

== Development ==
The original story of Majo-tachi no Nemuri was by Jirō Akagawa. Akagawa was a popular mystery author in Japan who had written several popular books. Several his works have been adapted to other mediums such as the film Sailor Suit and Machine Gun (1981) and the Family Computer game Akagawa Jirou no Yuurei Ressha (1991) for the Family Computer. Majo-tachi no Nemuri is based on two of his works:Majotachi no Tasogare and Majotachi no Nagai Nemuri.

Akagawa only provided the original novel, which was then adapted by the developers into the game and said that much of his original story was in the game with some additional stories brought into stretch it out. He described the game as sort of a meeting point between a film and a game. The game script supervisor was Kuniaki Kasahara, who worked as a screenwriter on Japanese television shows like Tales of the Unusual. (Note: 世にも奇妙な物語)

By April 7, 1995, Famicom Tsūshin reported that the game was at about 30% completion.

== Release ==
Majo-tachi no Nemuri was initially scheduled for release in mid-1995. It was released in Japan for the Super Famicom on November 24, 1995 by publisher Pack-In-Video. Jugemu had it ranked as the tenth best-selling Super Famicom game between the weeks of November 16 to December 15, 1995.

It was released for Windows 95-based home computers in Japan in November 1996 with some added features. A new version of the game was released for the PlayStation as Majo-tachi no Nemuri -Fukkatsusai- (Note: 魔女たちの眠り -復活祭-; lit. The Witches' Sleep -Easter-) on April 15, 1999. This release adds content such as a sequel to the story appearing once the true ending of the original game has been reached. The PlayStation version was released digitally on the PlayStation Store on December 22, 2010.

== Reception ==
Reception

Review score
Publication	Score
Famicom Tsūshin	6/10, 7/10, 7/10, 6/10 (SFC); 8/10, 6/10, 6/10, 6/10 (PS)

For the original release, the four reviewers in Famicom Tsūshin were mixed on how the story was presented. Two found it engaging and interesting while one said that the arrivals of monsters was too abrupt. Two reviewers disliked how they had to re-read the story parts they had read already and one said the production values weren't as strong as Banshee's Last Cry (1994), particularly with the quality of the sounds.

For the PlayStation release, the reviewers in Famicom Tsūshin were mixed. Hamamura Tsushin commented positively on the games story saying it moved at a good pace and some very strong moments while another reviewer said it made them want to read the novel. Another reviewer said there was no surprises if you were familiar with the first release and the sequel story felt forced. The fourth reviewer said the main narrative felt like a bunch of disjointed moments and they felt the choices they made did not impact the flow of the story enough. One reviewer from the publication complimented the ability to skip through previously heard moments while another to get to specific crossroad moments in the story while one said they found making the correct choice to progress difficult as it was too difficult to arrive at a correct answer even on repeated playthroughs.

== See also ==
- List of downloadable PlayStation games (Japan)
