= Sailor Suit and Machine Gun: Graduation =

- Theatrical release poster
- セーラー服と機関銃 卒業
- Directed by: Kōji Maeda
- Screenplay by: Ryō Takada
- Based on: Sailor Suit and Machine Gun and Swing Girls by Jirō Akagawa and Shinobu Yaguchi
- Produced by: Hideki Hoshino
- Starring: Kanna Hashimoto; Hiroki Hasegawa; Masanobu Andō
- Cinematography: Daisuke Sōma
- Edited by: Takashi Sato
- Music by: Shunsuke Kida
- Production companies: Kadokawa Daiei; Twins Japan; Tohan; Geek Pictures; RKB Mainichi Broadcasting
- Distributed by: Sony Pictures
- Release date: March 5, 2016 (Japan)
- Running time: 112 minutes
- Country: Japan
- Language: Japanese

Sailor Suit and Machine Gun: Graduation (Japanese: セーラー服と機関銃 卒業, Hepburn: Sērā-fuku to kikanjū Sotsugyō) is a 2016 Japanese youth drama comedy film directed by Kōji Maeda, released on 5 March 2016. A teaser trailer of this film was released in September 2015 and the film is a "spiritual sequel" to the 1981 film Sailor Suit and Machine Gun.

== Synopsis ==
Izumi Hoshi (Kanna Hashimoto) is senior in high school. In the past, she led a small yakuza group, but the yakuza group was disbanded after she killed her uncle's murderer. Izumi now lives an ordinary life as a high school student and works as a manager at a cafe. That situation is soon to change.

== Cast ==
- Kanna Hashimoto as Izumi Hoshi
- Hiroki Hasegawa as Tsukinaga
- Masanobu Andō as Yasui
- Takurō Ōno as Yuji
- Shōhei Uno as Haruo
- Tetsuya Takeda as Yakuza boss Medaka

== Awards and nominations ==
Year	Award	Category	Recipient	Result
2017	40th Japan Academy Prize	Newcomer Award	Kanna Hashimoto	Won
