= Sailor Suit and Machine Gun =

1978 novel by Jirō Akagawa

Sailor Suit and Machine Gun (セーラー服と機関銃, Sērā-fuku to kikanjū) is a Japanese novel by prolific author Jirō Akagawa published in 1978. It was well-received and adapted into a comedy/action film of the same name originally released in 1981. It was also adapted into a television program in 1982 and in 2006. In 2016, the film Sailor Suit and Machine Gun: Graduation was released, starring Kanna Hashimoto as Izumi Hoshi.

== 1982 television series cast ==
The cast of the drama series was as follows:

Character	(Japanese)	Actor	(Japanese)
Izumi Hoshi	星 泉	Tomoyo Harada	原田 知世
Makoto Sakuma	佐久間 真	Takashi Shikauchi	鹿内 孝
Dabo Ken (Kentarō Ōkouchi)	ダボ健（大河内 健太郎）	Kai Atō	阿藤 海
Akira (Akira Taniguchi)	アキラ（谷口 明）	Yasuhiro Arai	新井 康弘
Choro Matsu (Chōji Suzuki)	チョロ松（鈴木 兆治）	Hiromichi Hori	堀 広道
Shūhei Watanabe	渡辺 周平	Ryōichi Takayanagi	高柳 良一
Tomoo Takeuchi	竹内 智生	Kōji Minakami	水上 功治
Tetsuo Okusawa	奥沢 哲夫	Takayasu Ōno	大野 貴保
Etsuko	悦子	Shigeko Ōizumi	大泉 成子
Naomi Ōkura	大倉 直美	Naomi Hoshi	星 直美
The steward to the Ōkuras	大倉家執事	Makoto Matsuzaki	松崎 真
Shinako Tatara	多々良 品子	Emiko Tsutaki	蔦木 恵美子
Yutaka Matsumaru	松丸 豊	Hiroaki Fukui	秋山 武史
Mayumi	真由美	Jun Fubuki	風吹 ジュン
Detective Kuroki	黒木刑事	Bengal	ベンガル
Detectives	刑事	Tokyo Battery Kōjō	東京バッテリー工場
The Wakagashira of Hamaguchi-gumi	浜口組若頭	Susumu Kurobe	黒部 進
Hiromi Nakamoto	中本 ヒロミ	Erika Aso	麻生 えりか
Manager Oyama	大山マネージャー	Yūji Nakamura	中村 有二
One-armed man	片腕の男	Mamoru Sano	佐野 守
Kōichirō Dōjima	堂島 耕一郎	Ruūnosuke Kaneda (cameo)	金田 龍之介
Kotetsu Hoshi	星 小鉄	Masaya Takahashi (cameo)	高橋 昌也

== 2006 television series cast ==
The cast of the drama series was as follows:

Character	(Japanese)	Actor	(Japanese)
Izumi Hoshi	星 泉	Masami Nagasawa	長澤 まさみ
Takashi Hoshi	星 貴志	Jun Hashizume	橋爪 淳
Makoto Sakuma	佐久間 真	Shinichi Tsutsumi	堤 真一
Kinzo Sakai	酒井 金造	Ryūji Yamamoto	山本 龍二
Kenji Sakai	酒井 健次	Akiyoshi Nakao	中尾 明慶
Takeshi Nishino	西野 武	Hiromasa Taguchi	田口 浩正
Hideki Gōda	剛田 英樹	Hiroaki Fukui	福井 博章
Mayumi	真由美	Kyōko Koizumi	小泉 今日子
Hajime Sandaiji	三大寺 一	Ken Ogata (cameo)	緒形 拳
Kōhei Kuroki	黒木 幸平	Mantarō Koichi	小市 慢太郎
Michio Inaba	稲葉 通男	Ken Izawa	井澤 健
Noboru Hamaguchi	浜口 昇	Hirotarō Honda	本田 博太郎
Mitsuaki Shibata	柴田 光明	Hideo Nakano	中野 英雄
Ranmaru Mori	森 蘭丸	Ren Mori	森 廉
Tomo'o Iwakura	岩倉 智男	Hajime Okayama	おかやま はじめ
Kazuko Tokiwa	常盤 和子	Jūri Ihata	井端 珠里
Reika Kaneda	金田 麗華	Yūko Morimoto	森本 ゆうこ
Akemi Kobayashi	小林 朱美	Arisa Tani	谷 亜里咲
Tatsuo Medaka	目高 辰雄	Kokinji Katsura	桂 小金治
First floor resident		Sōsuke Sugiura	杉浦 双亮
Yūji Tezuka	手塚 勇次	Kōtarō Tanaka	田中 幸太朗
