= Kanna Hashimoto =

Japanese actress and singer (born 1999)

- 橋本 環奈
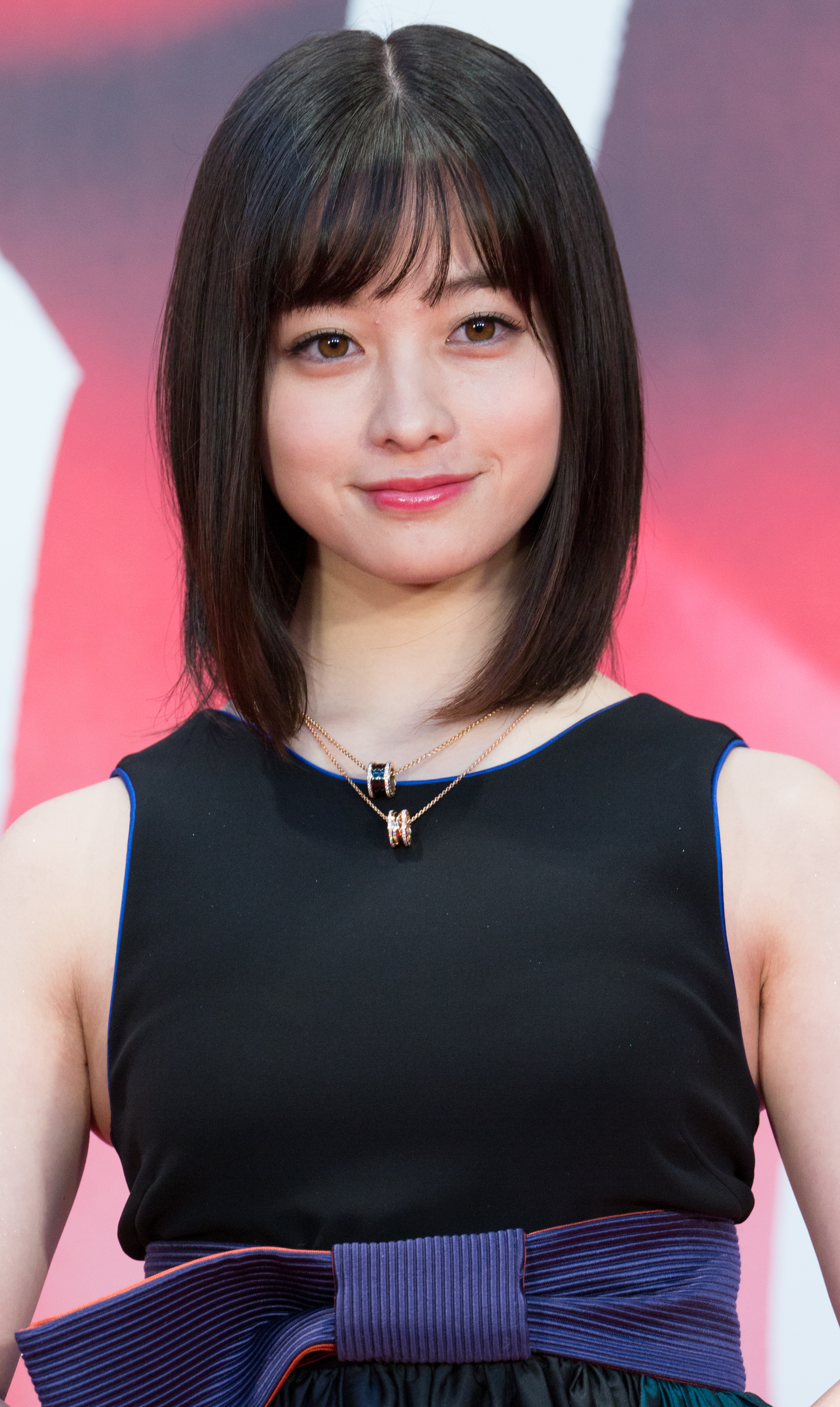
- Hashimoto at the Tokyo International Film Festival in 2017
- Born: February 3, 1999 (age 27); Fukuoka Prefecture, Japan
- Occupation: Actress
- Years active: 2007–present
- Musical career
- Genre: J-pop
- Instrument: Vocals
- Years active: 2011–2017
- Labels: Active Hakata (2011–2014); Yoshimoto R&C (2014–2016); Discovery Next (2016–2017)
- Formerly of: Rev. from DVL

Japanese name
- Hiragana: はしもと かんな
- Website: Official site

Kanna Hashimoto (Japanese: 橋本 環奈, Hepburn: Hashimoto Kanna; born February 3, 1999) is a Japanese actress and former singer. From 2011 to 2017, she was a member of the Fukuoka-based idol girl group Rev. from DVL. During her time with the group, in 2013, a fan-taken photo of her performing went viral on Twitter and 2channel, bringing her to nationwide attention.

As an actress, Hashimoto first appeared in I Wish (2011). Since 2013, Hashimoto has also starred in Sailor Suit and Machine Gun: Graduation (2016), of which she also released her debut single for the film. She has also starred in the films Haruta & Chika (2017), Gintama, The Disastrous Life of Saiki K. (2017), Kaguya-sama: Love is War (2019), Kingdom (2019), Kiss Me at the Stroke of Midnight (2019), and Violence Action (2022).

== Career ==
=== 2007–2012: Early career ===
In 2007, when Hashimoto was in third grade, she signed with the agency Active Hakata in her hometown, Fukuoka. She first worked in local commercials, and joined DVL, a co-ed dance and vocal unit under her agency, in 2009; she eventually joined DVL's all-female successor group Rev. from DVL. She made her stage debut after auditioning to be in Hirokazu Kore-eda's movie I Wish. After that, she appeared in productions by a children's theater company operated by her agency and in dramas by a local TV station. She wrote in her elementary school yearbook that her dream for the future was to be an "actress".

=== 2013–2015: Viral photo, hosting, acting ===
==== Viral photo ====
External image
- A photo of Hashimoto taken at Rev. from DVL's outdoor concert on May 3, 2013. The photo was taken by a blogger with the username Hakata no Take (博多のタケ; lit. "Take from Hakata"). The photo later went viral on 2channel and Twitter, bringing Hashimoto to nationwide attention.

In 2013, Hashimoto gained national attention when a photo of her taken at Rev. from DVL's live performances from November 3 to 4 went viral on 2channel and Twitter. Praised for her natural beauty, she was given titles such as "beyond cute local idol", "beyond angelic idol", and "a talent appearing once in a millennium." A post on Naver exceeded 550,000 views by November 7, 2013, and the server for her agency's official website was temporarily down due to excessive access. In the corner of NHK's late-night news program "News Web", "Tsubuyaki Big Data", which introduces trends on Twitter and Google Trends, showed that the number of searches on Google had risen rapidly, and had also spread to Chinese users. The photo was also mentioned on Good! Morning (Asahi TV) and Mezamashi TV (Fuji TV). According to her agency, in response to her viral photo, there was a flood for offers from TV commercial appearances and interviews.

Additionally, Kadokawa representative director Shinichiro Inoue who saw the photo "fell in love at first sight" and sent an email to his company saying "I want to make a movie with her"; the next weekend he went to a live performance held at a train station in Fukuoka and, struck by the excitement of the stage, said "I definitely want you to star in my next movie", thus casting her in Sailor Suit and Machine Gun: Graduation; this story was revealed at the press conference for the production of the movie.

Hashimoto herself said "I don't know even one millimeter of goodness" of the photo that triggered her breakthrough. She said, "there was frustration, and maybe I was showing it on my face".

==== Hosting, acting, and Sailor Suit and Machine Gun: Graduation ====
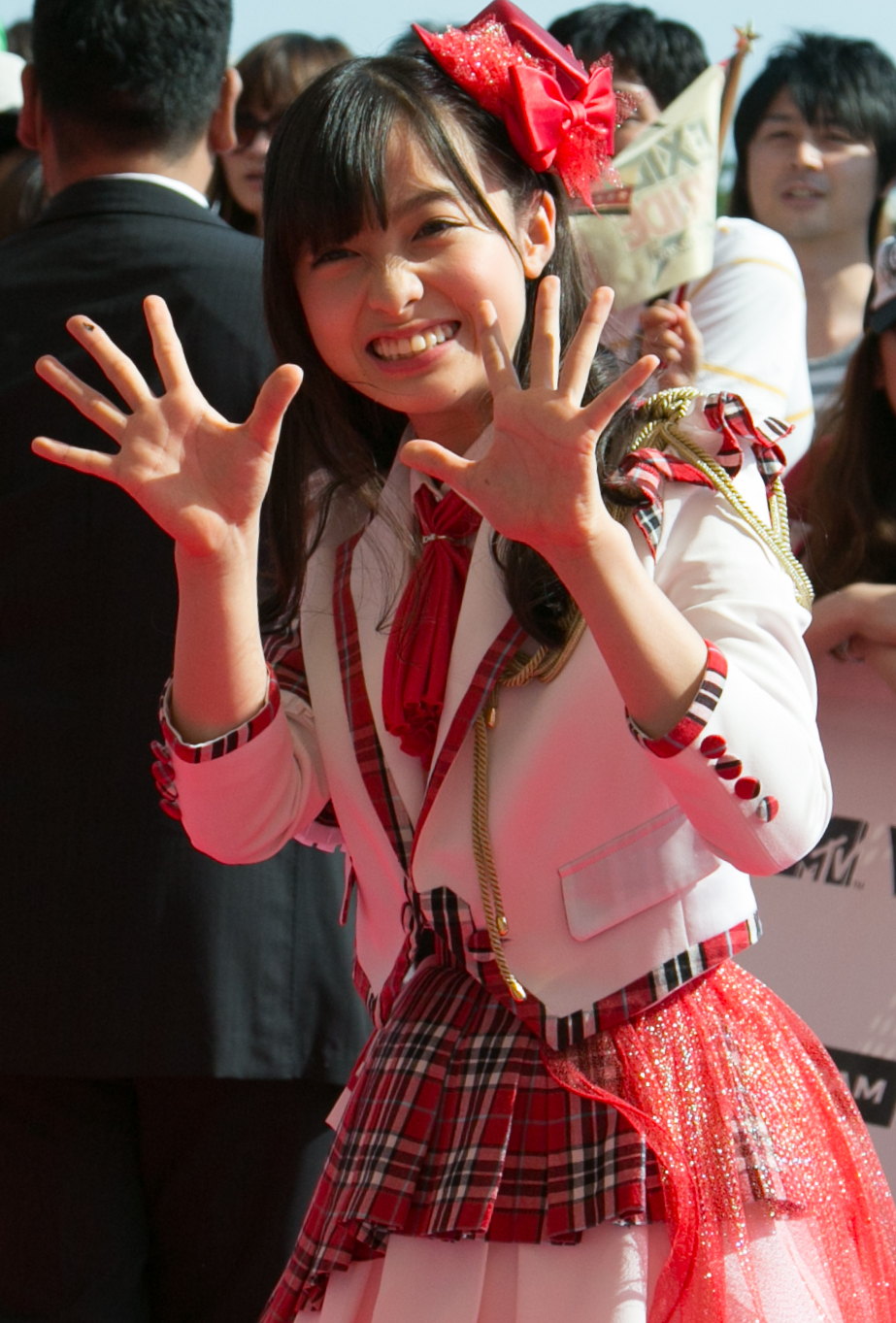
Hashimoto at the 2014 MTV Video Music Awards Japan

In April 2014, she was selected as a regular on the variety show Minna no Seishun Nozokimi TV Teen!Teen!, becoming the host of the program alongside Naoki Matayoshi and Yuju Ayabe of the comedy duo Peace. Hashimoto, who became a high school student, said, "I'm excited for the start of my first regular program. I'm nervous because it's my first time as a host, but I'll do my best, so please watch it!". Additionally, she was appointed as the MC of Daiichi Kosho's online karaoke "DAM Channel", welcoming various artists as guests and serving as the 11th and also the youngest MC in the program's history. In the May issue of the fashion magazine Popteen which was released in April, she made her first cover appearance and also featured on the cover for five pages. She also featured on the cover and opening gravure of Weekly Young Magazine, released at the same time, which was her first gravure activity. In July, she made her first appearance in a nationally broadcast serial drama with Fuji TV's Water Polo Yankees. Producer Ryota Fujino said, "Having an overwhelming presence and a sense of transparency, I am confident that she will move the characters and the story." She costarred with Yuto Nakajima in Episode 6. Hashimoto said, "Yesterday and this morning, my hands were sweaty, and I was really nervous." When asked if there was a role that she would like to try in the future, she said, "I haven't done anything yet, so really anything can 'come on'!". In August, she was featured on "Too angelic MC in a town that is too exquisite! Full summer in Sacas SP" which was a live broadcast special program on TBS. In November, she was selected as the "2014 Hit Person" by Nikkei Trendy alongside actor Tsuyoshi Muro, who acted as the commentator for the "Best 30 Hit Products of 2014" and the facilitator at the presentation.

In March 2015 she appeared in the live action of Assassination Classroom as Ritsu, an autonomous thinking fixed gun battery. She appeared as the host of the variety show "Rev. from DVL's Afterschool" and "Magic that changes the world! Algorithm Institute".

In June, at a press conference to announce the production of the movie Sailor Suit and Machine Gun: Graduation, a "spiritual sequel" to Sailor Suit and Machine Gun, held at Shinagawa Prince Hotel, it was announced that she would play the role of the main character, the fourth head of the Medaka group, a high-schooler who was a former teenage delinquent and becomes the boss of a yakuza, Izumi Hoshi. Hashimoto, who was starring in the work for the first time, said, "This is a work performed by famous actress seniors, so I want to act like Kanna Hashimoto, not like someone, but like Kanna Hashimoto." "I would like to seal the film and face the filming with courage and a positive heart," she said. Also, when asked about her future goals, she said, "I want to become an actress who can play a wide range of roles without being bound by one image." The trailer, which was released in December, revealed that she would be making her solo debut with the theme song "Sailor Suit and Machine Gun", a cover of the original by Hiroko Yakushimaru and Masami Nagasawa. Starting February 3, 2016, the music video for the theme song began distributing exclusively on U-Next for one week. From the 11th of the following week, it would be available publicly on the "Rev. from DVL Official Channel". Also, on the 8th, a public recording on NHK General Music Japan was held. Hashimoto, who would be performing solo, said, "I am very nervous to sing to everyone on such a big stage for MJ (Music Japan), which everyone dreams of appearing on." "But I'm not alone, I have everyone involved in Sailor Suit and Machine Gun: Graduation." On the 20th, she performed in the theme song on Fuji TV's Music Fair. The song ranked 1st on the Oricon Daily Chart. It also reached number 11 on Oricon's charts and charted for 7 weeks. On the first day of the movie's release on March 5, Hashimoto said, "Thanks to everyone involved in this movie, I've come to love movies and my job as an actress. I feel like I've taken my first step as an actress this time. Sailor Suit and Machine Gun: Graduation Izumi Hoshi will be graduating today, but I will take everything I learned from this work as an important lesson. I will also start walking towards new works and roles", sending a message of gratitude and determination to fans and related parties. In 2015, a web poll conducted by My Navi Student declared her the Cutest Idol from both the men's choices and women's choices list.

=== 2016–2017: Acting, graduation from Rev. from DVL ===
On March 17, 2016, it was announced that she would play the double lead role with Katsutoshi Sato in Haruchika. Hashimoto, who will be the second main character, said, "I entered high school again and caused a stir (laugh) I graduated and entered the school at a dizzying pace, but this time I will play a life-sized high school student. Please look forward to Chika, who will play a more natural Kanna Hashimoto!". In April, she appeared as a program moderator with Tokio's Shigeru Joshima and Bakarhythm at Hanamichi of Test: New Benzemi. She made a unique video of various study methods, acted as a moderator from the perspective of a current high school student, and Hashimoto herself participated in the video production. In August, it was revealed that she would play the role of the teenage alien girl Kagura in the Gintama live-action film. In expressing the world view of Gintama, Hashimoto commented, "I'm going to shoot as a strong, lovely, self-paced Kagura. Please look forward to it!". She also became a hot topic for dying her natural hair orange. According to producer Shinzo Matsuhashi, the casting of the heroine Kagura was a bit of a headache: "Director Fukuda and Mr. Oguri told me that Kanna Hashimoto would be the only one, and I thought, 'I see,' and that's how it was decided". In October, the live-action of The Disastrous Life of Saiki K started shooting. It was revealed that she would play the role of Kokomi Teruhashi. On December 7, she appeared on the first night of 2015 FNS Music Festival, costarring with Hiroko Yakushimaru in the movie theme song "Sailor Suit and Machine Gun".

On March 3, 2017, she won the Japan Academy New Actor Award for Sailor Suit and Machine Gun: Graduation. She expressed her gratitude to the staff involved in the film, and said, "With this award an encouragement, I will continue to devote myself to the world of film and the path of acting with humility and sincerity."

She portrayed Kokomi Teruhashi in the live-action The Disastrous Life of Saiki K. film. She portrayed the title character Kaguya Shinomiya in the live-action film adaptation of Kaguya-sama: Love Is War. On March 9, Haruchika was released. From that spring, she decided to focus solely on her acting career, saying "I hope that I can become someone who can give courage to others. I want to do each thing carefully and connect it to the next", setting goals for the future. That same month, she graduated from high school. On the 23rd of that month, Teen!Teen!, of which she had been a regular MC for three years, ended broadcasting. She also graduated from Hanamichi of Test: New Benzemi with Bakarhythm on the 27th. On the 31st, she graduated from Rev. from DVL with her last live performance in Fukuoka.

==== Tokyo ====
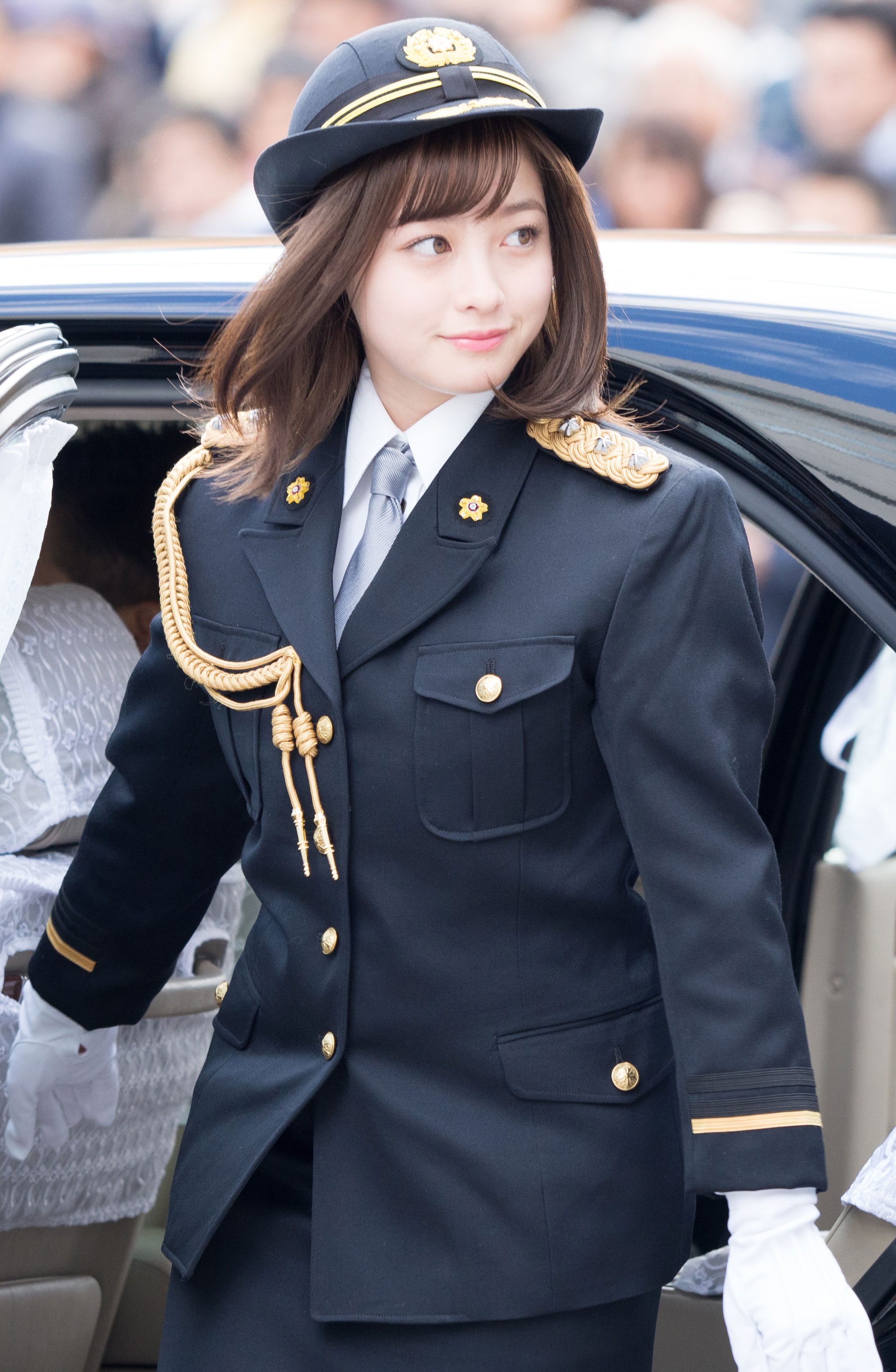
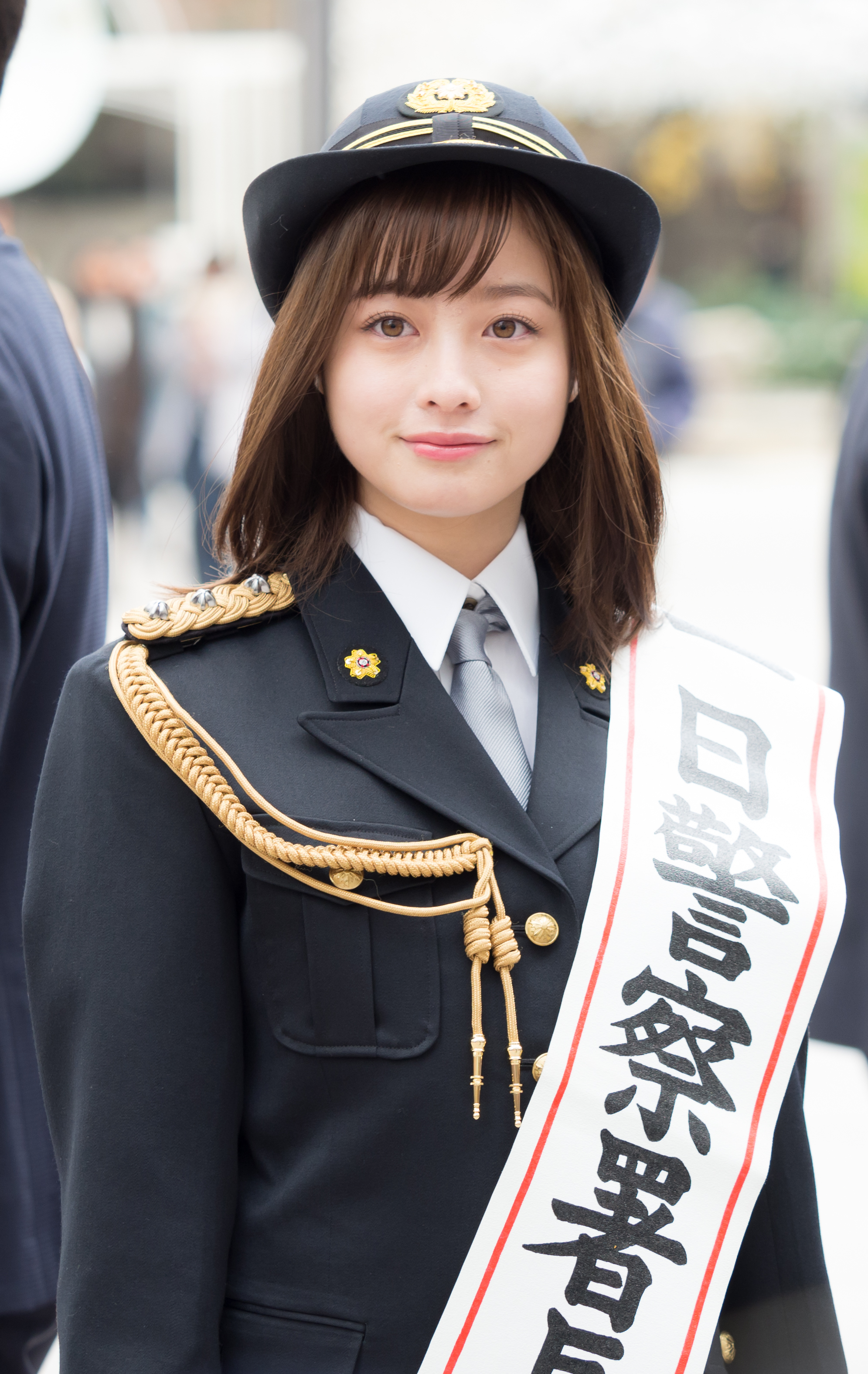
Hashimoto as the one-day police chief in December 2017

In April 2017 at an event in Tokyo, Hashimoto announced that she was preparing to move to Tokyo in order to get into full-scale acting. In May, she made a guest appearance on episode 3 of Fuji TV's series "Month 9" Kizoku Kantei. In June, it was announced that she would play the role of Usuki Keiko, a new police officer who is an animal enthusiast and Sudo (Atsuro Watanebe)'s partner on Fuji TV's series "Day 9" Metropolitan Police Department Ikimono Section for July. Hashimoto, who will play the role of the heroine for the first time in a serial drama, said, "I will try to be able to speedily and comically interact with Mr. Watanabe, and I hope to create a good combination between Sudo and Keiko, just like in the original work." Satoko Kashikawa, the production producer, said that the reason for Hashimoto's casting was that "Keiko Usuki, who plays the partner, is quite a unique character for a heroine, but Kanna Hashimoto, who has the strongest cuteness and a strong core, will play it. I am confident that he will become an existence that should be." A Twitter post on the 5th by Hashimoto became a hot topic with about 485,000 likes in 9 days. At the Tokyo Metropolitan election PR event held on the 24th, she reported on Twitter that she lives in Tokyo and that she had voted for the Tokyo Metropolitan Assembly election. In July, the movie Gintama was released. Looking back to the filming, Hashimoto says that she was able to grow by playing Kagura. Costars Oguri and Suda have praised her earnestness in acting with her body and charm as a heroine. In September, Metropolitan Police Department Ikimono Section cranked up. From beginning to end, she thanked the staff and chairman Atsuro Watabe for their support as the first heroine of the serial drama and the mood maker of this work.

=== 2018–2019: Gintama 2, official fan club ===
In January 2018 she appeared as the Fukuoka Central Police Station Chief Special Alert for One Day on "Tuesday 9" Final Cut. She also participated in the popular corner of the variety show Guru Guru Ninety-Nine and was confirmed to be a new member of "I Will Become a Gourmet Chicken Race Gochi! 19". In April, it was officially announced that the sequel to Gintama, which was the number one box-office hit of the previous year's live-action Japanese film, would be continued with Gintama 2: The Law is Surely There to be Broken. It was also announced that she would appear as the heroine Kyoko Hayakawa, a former Yankee gang leader, in the October NTV Sunday drama Kyo Kara Ore wa!!. This is the fourth time that she has appeared in director Yuichi Fukuda's work. On November 3, at the Rikkyo University school festival, she was scheduled to make an appearance, but due to it being flooded with spectators and safety of the outdoor special stage not being assured, police guidance was given and her appearance was cancelled. On December 20, she graduated from the corner of Guru Guru Ninety-Nine, only appearing as a regular for one year. On December 23, she was revealed to be part of the cast of Twelve Children Who Want to Die which was released on January 25 of the following year by Warner Bros.

On July 15, 2019, her official fan club "Hashimoto Junjō Naika o Hossoku" was launched. The following month, she held her first fan meetings in Osaka and Tokyo. Kaguya-sama: Love is War, which was released nationwide on September 6, became the number one weekend audience mobilization for the first time. On September 10, it was announced that she would be signing exclusively with Discovery Next. On December 10, Twitter Japan announced that she was ranked 8th in 2019 as the "actor that became a hot topic in the world".

=== 2020-present: Spirited Away, Banpaku no Taiyo ===
On January 17, 2020, it was announced that she had received the 2020 Elan d'or Award for Newcomer of the Year which is given to the most promising new actor who has been most active throughout the year. On February 6, the award ceremony was held at the Keo Plaza Hotel in Tokyo, and director Hiroazu Kore-eda of the movie I Wish, her screen debut, was the presenter and congratulated her.

On February 26, it was announced that Hashimoto would be making her stage debut in the stage adaptation of Spirited Away, written and directed by John Caird, in February 2022, with Hashimoto and Mone Kamishiraishi doubly playing the role of the main character, Chihiro. On the variety program 130 million people's Show Channel broadcast on June 12, she challenged "the largest number of facial tissues pulled out of the box in one minute", achieving the record of 157 and exceeding the previous record of 140, becoming the Guinness World Record holder. However, the record was later broken. On August 20, the movie Kaguya-sama Final: Love is War starring Hashimoto with Sho Hirano was released.

In December 2023, it was announced that Hashimoto would be starring in the TV Asahi 65th anniversary drama Banpaku no Taiyo, its story based on the 1970 Osaka Expo. The theme song for the show was provided by Ayumi Hamasaki, being a cover of hit song "Jidai" by Miyuki Nakajima—the Osaka Expo's original theme. The show aired in March 2024.

In the revival of the Japanese version of Who Wants to Be a Millionaire? aired January 1, 2026, Hashimoto became the first person to win the 10 million yen grand prize in 13 years.

== Personal life ==
Hashimoto was born on February 3, 1999, in Fukuoka Prefecture, Japan. Her family consists of her mother, father, an older brother seven years her senior, and her twin brother. Ryōko Morooka, an organist, is her aunt.

== Public image ==
Beginning with her viral photo in 2013, Hashimoto has been labelled as cute and angelic. This affected her casting in films as well as endorsements. Juichi Uehara, a producer at Fuji TV, cited Hashimoto's "miraculous presence that combines perfection and cuteness" as the reason she was cast as Ritsu in Assassination Classroom. Oki Miichi, one of the directors of Hashimoto's "Devilish Kanna" advertisement for Rohto Pharmaceutical's "Lip Baby Crayon", stated that he came up with the idea after thinking that Hashimoto, "with the 'exceedingly angelic' image" would become a hot topic as a devil, the opposite, in a commercial.

== Other ventures ==
=== Endorsements ===
Hashimoto has appeared in numerous commercials for Rohto Pharmaceutical, NTT Docomo, UHA Mikakuto, Timee, Gyu-Kaku, and Nissin Foods. In 2015, her "Devilish Kanna" advertisement for Rohto Pharmaceutical's "Lip Baby Crayon" helped the product reach 200% of its sales target. Throughout 2020 in the Kantō region for on-air commercials, she ranked first in terms of the number of companies and second in terms of the number of advertisements, after Ryoko Yonekura. Also, in the first three days of 2021, she appeared in the most commercial broadcasts.

=== Ambassadorship ===
Hashimoto was appointed as the ambassador of the 30th Tokyo International Film Festival "to convey the appeal of films to young people of the same generation", attending the red carpet and opening ceremony on the first day of the festival.

In December 2017, Hashimoto served as the one-day police chief for the Prefectural Central Police Station in Fukuoka, her hometown, publicizing special precautions for the year-end and New Year holidays.

== Discography ==
=== Singles ===
Year	Title	Peak chart position		Album
Year	Title	Oricon	Billboard Japan	Album
2016	"Sailor Fuku to Kikanjū"	11	13	Sailor Suit and Machine Gun: Graduation OST

=== Music videos ===
- "Little Star ~KANNA15~" (February 3, 2015)

== Filmography ==
=== Film ===
Year	Title	Role	Notes	Ref(s)
2011	I Wish	Kanna Hayami		
2015	Assassination Classroom	Ritsu / Autonomous Intelligence Fixed Artillery		
2016	Sailor Suit and Machine Gun: Graduation	Izumi Hoshi	Lead role	
2016	Assassination Classroom: Graduation	Ritsu		
2017	Haruta & Chika	Chika Homura	Lead role	
2017	Gintama	Kagura		
2017	The Disastrous Life of Saiki K.	Kokomi Teruhashi		
2018	Gintama 2: Rules Are Made To Be Broken	Kagura		
2019	12 Suicidal Teens	Ryoko		
2019	Kaguya-sama: Love Is War	Kaguya Shinomiya	Lead role	
2019	Kingdom	He Liao Diao		
2019	Signal 100	Rena Kashimura	Lead role	
2019	Come Kiss Me at 0:00 AM	Hinana Hanazawa	Lead role	
2020	From Today, It's My Turn the Movie!	Kyōko Hayakawa		
2020	Yowamushi Pedal: Up the Road	Miki Kanzaki		
2020	Our Story	Shīna Koyurugi	Lead role	
2020	The Untold Tale of the Three Kingdoms	Lady Huang		
2021	Kaguya-sama Final: Love Is War	Kaguya Shinomiya	Lead role	
2021	Daughter of Lupin the Movie	Mikumo Hōjō		
2022	Kingdom 2: Far and Away	He Liao Diao		
2022	Violence Action	Kei Kikuno	Lead role	
2022	Re/Member	Asuka Morisaki	Lead role	
2022	Black Night Parade	Shino Hōjō		
2023	Yudo: The Way of the Bath	Izumi Akiyama		
2023	One Last Bloom	Kanako Hirooka		
2023	Kingdom 3: The Flame of Destiny	He Liao Diao		
2023	Nemesis: The Mystery of the Golden Spiral	Tomomi Yotsuba		
2023	The Forbidden Play	Hiroko Kurasawa	Lead role	
2023	Once Upon a Crime	Little Red Riding Hood	Lead role	
2024	Kingdom 4: Return of the Great General	He Liao Diao		
2025	Re/Member: The Last Night	Asuka Morisaki	Lead role	
2026	Shin Gekijōban Keroro Gunsō: Fukkatsu Shite Sokkō Chikyū Metsubō no Kiki de Arimasu!	Kagura (voice)		
2026	Kingdom 5: The Clash of Souls	He Liao Diao		

=== Television ===
Year	Title	Role	Notes	Ref(s)
2012	Sumiyoshi-ke Monogatari: Wakuwaku ga, Uchi ni Yattekuru	Sora Sumiyoshi		
2014	Water Polo Yankees	Herself		
2017	The Noble Detective	Haruka Tarumi	Episode 3	
2017	MPD Animal Unit	Keiko Usuki	Lead role	
2018	Final Cut	Wakaba Okawara		
2018	Gintama 2: Yomino Kimyo na Gintama-chan	Kagura	Web drama	
2018	From Today, It's My Turn!!	Kyōko Hayakawa		
2019	One Page Love	Akari Minase	Lead role; web drama	
2020	Daughter of Lupin 2	Mikumo Hōjō		
2021	Influence	Yuri Totsuka	Lead role; miniseries	
2021	Nemesis	Tomomi Yotsuba		
2021	Kaguya-sama: Love Is War - Mini	Kaguya Shinomiya	Lead role; web drama	
2023	Kissing the Ring Finger	Ayaka Haneda	Lead role	
2023	Ring Finger Dedicated to the Queen	Ayaka Haneda	Web drama	
2023	Special Order! Metro Police Special Accounting Department!	Madoka Hajime	Lead role	
2024	Banpaku no Taiyō	Kyoko Asano	Lead role; television film	
2024–2025	Omusubi	Yui Yoneda	Lead role; Asadora	
2025	Ameku Takao's Detective Karte	Ameku Takao	Lead role	
2026	Delinquent to Doctor	Kotoha Tagami	Lead role	
2026	The Rules of Vacation	Midori Hoshino	Lead role; South Korean-Japanese drama	

=== Other television ===
Year	Title	Notes	Ref(s)
2014	Minna no Seishun Nozoki mi TV Teen! Teen!	As a panelist	
2015	Sekai o Kaeru Mahō! Algorithmi-ko Kenkyūsho	Host, educational program	
2018	Guru Guru Ninety Nine	Regular member of "Gochi ni Narimasu 19"	
2022	73rd NHK Kōhaku Uta Gassen	Host	
2023	74th NHK Kōhaku Uta Gassen	Host	
2024	75th NHK Kōhaku Uta Gassen	Host	

=== Stage ===
Year	Title	Role	Notes	Ref(s)
2022	Spirited Away	Chihiro Ogino / Sen	Double starring with Mone Kamishiraishi	

=== Commercials ===
- Jibannet Holdings – Jiban Second Opinion (2013)
- SoftBank Mobile – White Family (2014)
- TV Tokyo – 2014 World Team Table Tennis Championships (2014)
- Cyber Agent – Ameba Girl Friend Beta (2014)
- Megmilk Snow Brand Company, Limited – Neosoft "Koku Aru Butter Fūmi" (2014)
- Bandai – Aikatsu! (2014)
- Nissin Foods – Cup noodle (2015)
- Rohto Pharmaceutical Co. – Lip Baby Crayon/Lip Baby Fruits (2015)
- Recruit – Townwork (2016)

== Publications ==
=== Photobooks ===
- Hashimoto Kanna Mook (December 18, 2013, Kaiohsha) ISBN 9784796460897
- Little Star: Kanna 15 (November 14, 2014, Wani Books) ISBN 9784847046926
- Yume no Tochū: Hashimoto Kanna in the movie "Sailor Suit and Machine Gun: Graduation" (March 5, 2016, Kadokawa) ISBN 9784041040157
- Naturel (February 3, 2019, Kodansha) ISBN 9784065150351
- Kaleidoscope (February 3, 2024, Kodansha) ISBN 9784065339268

== Awards and nominations ==
Year presented, name of the award ceremony, category, nominee(s) of the award, and the result of the nomination
Year	Award ceremony	Category	Nominated work(s)	Result	Ref(s)
2014	Ameba Next Break Blogger 2014	Idol Category	Kanna Hashimoto	Won	
2014	Nikkei Trendy Works Top 30	Person of The Year 2014	Kanna Hashimoto	Won	
2014	21st Best Smile of the Year	—N/a	Kanna Hashimoto	Won	
2014	Yahoo! Search Awards 2014	Idol Category	Kanna Hashimoto	Won	
2014	26th Japan Jewelry Best Dresser Awards	Teens Category	Kanna Hashimoto	Won	
2015	1st Christmas Jewelry Princess Awards	Special Award	Kanna Hashimoto	Won	
2015	Nail Queen Awards 2015	Artist Category	Kanna Hashimoto	Won	
2017	40th Japan Academy Film Prize	Newcomer Award	Sailor Suit and Machine Gun: Graduation	Won	
2017	30th Nikkan Sports Film Award	Best Newcomer	Gintama	Nominated	
2019	7th Japan Action Award	Best Action Actress Award (Excellence Award)	From Today, It's My Turn!!, Gintama 2: Rules Are Made To Be Broken	Won	
2019	4th Beauty Week HAIR OF THE YEAR	Hair of the Year 4th Grand Prix & Beauty Week Award	Kanna Hashimoto	Won	
2020	44th Elan d'or Awards	Newcomer of the Year	Kanna Hashimoto	Won	
2021	25th Nikkan Sports Drama Grand Prix Spring Drama	Best Supporting Actress	Nemesis	Won	
2022	LINE News Awards 2022	Actor Category	Kanna Hashimoto	Won	
2024	66th Blue Ribbon Awards	Best Supporting Actress	Nemesis: The Mystery of the Golden Spiral and One Last Bloom	Nominated	
