= Alissa Yagi =

Japanese actress and model (born 1995)

- 八木 アリサ
- Born: Arisa Yagi; July 31, 1995 (age 30); Hokkaido, Japan
- Occupations: Model; actress
- Years active: 2006–present
- Agent: Amuse, Inc.
- Height: 168 cm (5 ft 6 in)
- Website: artist.amuse.co.jp/artist/yagi_arisa/

Alissa Yagi (八木 アリサ, Yagi Arisa; born July 31, 1995), also known as Arisa Yagi, is a Japanese actress and model associated with Amuse, Inc. From 2008 to 2012, Yagi was an exclusive model for the pre-teen fashion magazine Nicola. Since 2012, she modeled exclusively for the magazine Vivi, and in 2014, she made her acting debut as Megumi Kitagawa in the live-action film adaptation of Say I Love You.

== Career ==
Yagi was scouted at Actors Studio in Hokkaido Headquarters School recital and was set to debut in the girl group Teardrops but left in October 2006. She auditioned for Lyra in the Japanese dub of The Golden Compass and became a finalist in the competition, which led her to be scouted by Nicola. She modeled exclusively for the magazine beginning in the February 2008 issue and graduated in 2012 at the nicola Tokyo Open Day 2012.

She first appeared in ViVi in October 2011 in the December issue. Beginning in 2012, she became an exclusive model for the fashion magazine Vivi.

In 2014, Yagi appeared on the South Korean reality show We Got Married: Global Edition, where she was paired with Key from Shinee. Later in October, she modeled at the A-Nation and Girls Award Island Collection collaboration concert event in Singapore and Super Girls Expo in Taiwan.

In 2015, she modeled at Tokyo Runway 2015 Spring/Summer, and Kobe Collection 2015 Spring/Summer.

She had her first solo cover in the March 2016 version of ViVi released on January 23, 2016. Yagi modeled at the Tokyo Girls Collection 2016 Autumn/Winter show. On August 20, Yagi released her first photobook, Yagi Magazine.

In 2018, Yagi modeled at the Tokyo Girls Collection 2018 Autumn/Winter show. In 2019, Yagi modeled at the Rakuten Girls Award 2019 Spring/Summer show. She has also been the model spokesperson for fashion and make-up brands such as Samantha Thavasa, Candy Stripper, and Canmake.

From 2020 till 2023, Yagi played the role of Mimi Marquez in the musical Rent.

In November 2020, one of her costars in the musical "RENT" contracted COVID-19, and Yagi also tested positive. A total of 21 people involved in the musical tested positive, so all performances were cancelled. On December 1, she announced on her Instagram that she would be returning to work after her recuperation period. She contracted COVID-19 for the second time on January 31, 2022.

Yagi graduated from ViVi with the February 2022 issue. In May 2022, a collaboration item with lingerie brand bijorie was released.

== Personal life ==
Yagi was born on July 31, 1995, in Hokkaido, Japan to a French father and a Japanese mother. She is an only child. She is fluent in English and Japanese but has also studied Korean and Chinese. When she was in elementary school, she lived in Thailand and Tahiti.

== Publications ==
=== Photo books ===
Year	Title	Publisher	ISBN
2016	Yagi Magazine (やぎマガジン)	Kodansha	ISBN 978-4-06-220236-7

== Filmography ==
=== Music video ===
Year	Title	Artist	Note
2008	"Anata ga Koko ni Itara"	Porno Graffitti	—
2015	"Ohhh!!! Hanabi"	Porno Graffitti	—
2015	"Ashita wa Kitto Ii Hi ni Naru"	Rihwa	—

=== Television ===
Year	Title	Role	Network	Note
2009–2010	Necktie Princess	Herself	TV Tokyo	Variety show regular
2014	We Got Married: Global Edition (season 2)	Herself	MBC TV	Reality show; partnered with Key (Shinee)
2018	Love Love Alien 2	Sumire Kitamura	Fuji TV	—
2020	Isekai Izakaya "Nobu" Season 1	Eleonora	Wowow	—
2022	Isekai Izakaya "Nobu" Season 2	Eleonora	Wowow	—
2022	What Six Survivors Told	Mogami Sana	MBS TBS	—

=== Film ===
Year	Title	Role	Notes	Ref.
2014	Say I Love You.	Megumi Kitagawa	Debut acting role	
2018	Zenigata	Sawako Sugiyama		
2019	Hot Gimmick: Girl Meets Boy			
2019	Come On, Kiss Me Again!	Akari Kazami	Lead role	
2019	Kiss Me at the Stroke of Midnight	Shu Uchida		
2021	The Sun Stands Still	Nana		
2021	We Made a Beautiful Bouquet			
2024	The Dancing Okami	Catherine		
