= Emit (video game) =

Video game developed by Koei

EMIT
- Developer: Koei
- Publisher: Koei
- Platforms: FM Towns, Macintosh, Windows, PC-9801, Sega Saturn, Super Famicom, 3DO, PlayStation
- Release: March 25, 1994: Emit Vol. 1: Lost in Time FM-Towns; JP: March 25, 1994 Macintosh; JP: March 1994 Windows; JP: March 1994; JP: 1995 PC-9801; JP: September 30, 1994 Sega Saturn; JP: March 25, 1995 Super Famicom; JP: March 25, 1995 3DO; JP: April 14, 1995 Emit Vol. 2: Desperate Journey Macintosh; JP: March 1994 Windows; JP: March 1994; JP: 1995 FM-Towns; JP: July 1, 1994 PC-9801; JP: January 13, 1995 Super Famicom; JP: March 25, 1995 Sega Saturn; JP: April 1, 1995 3DO; JP: July 14, 1995 Emit Vol. 3: Farewell to Me Macintosh; JP: March 1994 Windows; JP: March 1994; JP: 1995 FM-Towns; JP: September 18, 1994 PC-9801; JP: March 17, 1995 Super Famicom; JP: March 25, 1995 Sega Saturn; JP: April 1, 1995 3DO; JP: September 14, 1995 Emit Value Pack PlayStation; JP: September 29, 1995 Sega Saturn; JP: December 15, 1995 Super Famicom; JP: December 15, 1995 PC-9801; JP: December 15, 1995 Windows; JP: 1995 Macintosh; JP: 1995
- Genres: Adventure; Sound novel
- Mode: Single-player

Emit (エミット, Emitto) is an adventure sound novel video game developed and published by Koei. It was designed to teach Japanese students more about English, and played the audio CD back at particular times using a peripheral called Voicer-kun, an IR emitter that could command the CD to change tracks and play them. It is the first visual novel in the "English Dream" series, the only other being an unconnected novel named Dark Hunter.

The game was originally released in 1994 and divided into 3 volumes: Lost in Time (時の迷子, Toki no maigo), Desperate Journey (命がけの旅, Inochigake no tabi) and Farewell to Me (私にさよならを, Watashi ni sayonara o). The scenario writing for all 3 volumes was done by Akagawa Jirou. The plot is about another world connected to ours where people age in reverse.

== Summary ==
=== Lost in Time ===
Tanaka Yuri, a high school student, is stopped at a crosswalk by an old man. He asks her what day and year it is, if there is a clock store nearby, and says the word "EMIT". Yuri later asks her parents about the clock store, and learns that it is now a bookstore.

A few days later, she is approached by a young man. He claims that he is the same old man from before, and he comes from another dimension where people are born elderly and age backwards. He also claims that he came to this dimension by using a portal which is now broken, and the only other one he knows of is supposed to be in a clock store. For each day he stays in this dimension, he will "age" one year, growing younger and younger until he turns into a baby and disappears. As he was a visibly old man when Yuri met him on the street, by his claim he would actually be very young. Yuri refuses to believe any of this and storms off.

Over a week later, while Yuri is preparing to take her English test, she sees a small, sad boy watching her from outside the school. Yuri realizes his similarity to the old and young man, and that he would be the right age if he really had been getting a year younger a day. She leaves the school and, working together with the boy, whose name is Ken, they sneak into the bookstore's basement, and discover the portal there. Before returning home, Ken admits he had been relying on Yuri because she looked exactly like his mother.

Later on in her room, Yuri is trying to figure out what the word "EMIT" could have meant, and laughs to herself she spells it backwards.

=== Desperate Journey ===
Yuri runs into an old friend she had lost contact with, Ichirou. She is happy to see him again, but he claims that they just reunited at a party last night. Yuri does not remember this at all, and Ichirou said she had not remembered him last night either, although she did say a word he did not understand, "Emit".

Yuri is confused by this. Remembering that the boy had said his mother looked just like her, she suspects that she may have crossed into our world. In an attempt to investigate, she returns to the bookstore, but when she attempts to check the portal she is pushed into it- by herself.

Awaking in the other world, Yuri finds it just as the boy describes, with old men and women running and playing in the park while children relax on the benches. She manages to meet up with Ken again, who has returned to being an old man, and he tells Yuri that his mother, whose name is Julia, has indeed fled to Yuri's world where she is viewed as being young and beautiful. Yuri attempts to return to her world, but finds that the portal patrolled by armed guards on this side.

A few days later, she and Ken are waiting outside the portal in the rain. Just as Ken had, she has aged a year for every day she has spent in the other world, and is now in her early twenties. Desperate and seeing no other option, she attempts to rush past the armed guards while Ken distracts them. She succeeds in making it back to the portal, but is shot, and falls unconscious.

=== Farewell to Me ===
Back in Yuri's world, Julia has taken over Yuri's life and deeply enjoying herself. In exchange for Yuri aging in Julia's world, Julia is staying young. However, Ichirou has grown suspicious. Although he originally thought Yuri had simply forgotten him and gotten more mature, he has become convinced that the second Yuri he met is the real one and that someone has taken her place. He shares his suspicions with Yuri's mother, who has had similar doubts.

At the same time, Yuri staggers home. The shot grazed her shoulder; she is in pain but alive. Collapsing onto the sofa, she is interrupted in her moment of relaxation by Julia wielding a knife. She stabs for Yuri's face, but Yuri dodges, and attempts to talk it out. She tells Julia that Ken is worried about her, but Julia still refuses to return. Then, Ichirou and Yuri's mother enter. Before they can arrive, Julia flees.

Yuri tries to explain the situation, but Ichirou grabs her wounded arm, still thinking she is Julia. He stops when she cries out in pain. He asks her if she is the real Yuri, and is convinced when she is infuriated that he would even ask.

Days later, Yuri is healthy and has returned to her normal age. Ken has returned to Yuri's world to retrieve his mother, who, now that Yuri has returned, has resumed "aging", and is now a small girl. Although they all part on good terms, Julia is reluctant to leave Ichirou.

== Reception ==
On release, Famicom Tsūshin scored both Volume 2 and Volume 3 of the Sega Saturn version of the game a 23 out of 40 each.
