= Voicer-kun =

Infrared transmitter/receiver for the Super Famicom

The Voicer-kun (ボイサーくん, Boisā-kun) (sometimes erroneously called "Voice-kun") from Koei is an infrared transmitter/receiver for the Super Famicom that connects to the second controller port. The IR-transmitter is used for controlling Audio CD players, and is able to "learn" IR-signals from different CD Player manufacturers.

== Compatible games ==
Below is a list of compatible games. The games' package included the Voicer-kun hardware, one or two Audio CDs, and a Super Famicom game cartridge.

- Angelique Voice Fantasy (1996)
- EMIT Vol. 1 - Toki no Maigo (1995)
- EMIT Vol. 2 - Inochigake no Tabi (1995)
- EMIT Vol. 3 - Watashi ni Sayonara wo (1995)
- EMIT Value Set (Vol. 1-3) (1995)

== Soundware ==
Koei also made a number of "Soundware" games for other consoles/computers, which did also include audio CDs or audio tapes. While using a similar concept, the Voicer-kun games were not part of the Soundware series.
