= The Violence Action =

Japanese manga series

- First tankōbon volume cover

バイオレンスアクション
- Genre: Action
- Manga
- Written by: Shin Sawada
- Illustrated by: Renji Asai
- Published by: Shogakukan
- Magazine: Yawaraka Spirits
- Original run: April 25, 2016 – present
- Volumes: 7
- icon

The Violence Action (Japanese: バイオレンスアクション, Hepburn: Baiorensu Akushon) is a Japanese manga series written by Shin Sawada and illustrated Renji Asai. It has been serialized on Shogakukan's Yawaraka Spirits website since April 2016.

== Media ==
=== Manga ===
Written by Shin Sawada and illustrated Renji Asai, The Violence Action started on Shogakukan's Yawaraka Spirits website on April 25, 2016. The series went on hiatus in March 2018, due to one of the author's poor health, and resumed in June 2019. Shogakukan has collected its chapters into individual tankōbon volumes. The first volume was released on March 10, 2017. As of August 12, 2022, seven volumes have been released.

==== Volumes ====
| No. | Japanese release date | Japanese ISBN |
|---|---|---|
| 1 | March 10, 2017 | 978-4-09-189449-6 |
| 2 | July 12, 2017 | 978-4-09-189593-6 |
| 3 | October 12, 2017 | 978-4-09-189677-3 |
| 4 | May 11, 2018 | 978-4-09-860008-3 |
| 5 | November 12, 2019 | 978-4-09-860508-8 |
| 6 | July 10, 2020 | 978-4-09-860662-7 |
| 7 | August 12, 2022 | 978-4-09-861433-2 |

=== Live-action film ===
In July 2020, it was announced that the manga would receive a "screen adaptation". In February 2022, it was announced that the screen adaptation would be a live action film. It was directed and written by Tōichirō Rutō, co-written Itaru Era and starring Kanna Hashimoto as Kei Kikuno. It premiered on August 19, 2022.

== Reception ==
The Violence Action ranked first in the May 2017 edition of Takarajimasha's Kono Manga ga Sugoi! Web; it ranked 10th on Kono Manga ga Sugoi! 2018 list of best manga for male readers. The series ranked seventh on "The Best Manga 2018 Kono Manga wo Yome!" ranking by Freestyle magazine. It ranked ninth on the "Nationwide Bookstore Employees' Recommended Comics" by the Honya Club website in 2018.
