= Kiss Me at the Stroke of Midnight =

Japanese manga series

- Cover of vol. 1 of the Japanese version, first released on July 13, 2015

午前0時、キスしに来てよ (Gozen 0-ji, Kisu Shi ni Kite yo)
- Genre: Comedy, romance
- Manga
- Written by: Rin Mikimoto
- Published by: Kodansha
- English publisher: NA: Kodansha USA
- Imprint: Kodansha Comics Bessatsu Friend
- Magazine: Bessatsu Friend
- Original run: April 13, 2015 – May 13, 2020
- Volumes: 12
- Live-action film
- Directed by: Takehiko Shinjō
- Written by: Haruka Ōkita
- Music by: Sayuri Hayashi Egnell
- Studio: Shochiku
- Released: December 6, 2019
- Runtime: 115 minutes

Kiss Me at the Stroke of Midnight (Japanese: 午前0時、キスしに来てよ, Hepburn: Gozen Rei-ji, Kisu Shi ni Kite yo; alternatively titled Come Kiss Me at 0:00 AM internationally for the live-action film) is a Japanese manga series by Rin Mikimoto. Kiss Me at the Stroke of Midnight was serialized in the monthly shōjo manga magazine Bessatsu Friend from April 13, 2015, to May 13, 2020. A live-action film adaptation of the same name was released on December 6, 2019.

== Plot ==
Hinana Hanazawa, a diligent and hard-working honors student, secretly yearns for a fairytale-like romance. One day, popular actor Kaede Ayase comes to film a movie at her high school, in which she is appearing as an extra. Hinana discovers that Kaede's true personality is different from his princely image, but in spite of this, they both fall in love with each other. However, difficulties arise in their relationship due to their different social statuses.

== Characters ==
Hinana Hanazawa (花澤 日奈々, Hanazawa Hinana)
Voiced by: Sora Amamiya (drama CD); portrayed by: Kanna Hashimoto (film)
Kaede Ayase (綾瀬 楓, Ayase Kaede)
Voiced by: Yuki Kaji (drama CD); portrayed by: Ryota Katayose (film)
Akira Hamabe (浜辺 彰, Hamabe Akira)
Voiced by: Junya Enoki (drama CD); Portrayed by: Gordon Maeda (film)
Shu Uchida (内田 柊, Uchida Shū)
Portrayed by: Alissa Yagi (film)

== Media ==
=== Manga ===
Kiss Me at the Stroke of Midnight is written and illustrated by Rin Mikimoto. It was serialized in the monthly magazine Bessatsu Friend from the May 2015 issue released on April 13, 2015, to the June 2020 issue released on May 13, 2020. The chapters were later released in 12 bound volumes by Kodansha under the Kodansha Comics Bessatsu Friend imprint.

At New York Comic Con 2016, Kodansha USA announced that they were publishing the series in English for North American distribution.

No.	Original release date	Original ISBN	English release date	English ISBN
1	July 13, 2015	978-4-06-341993-1	September 19, 2017	978-1-63-236494-4
2	December 11, 2015	978-4-06-392023-9	November 21, 2017	978-1-63-236495-1
3	April 13, 2016	978-4-06-392038-3	January 30, 2018	978-1-63-236496-8
4	September 13, 2016	978-4-06-392078-9	March 20, 2018	978-1-63-236558-3
5	January 13, 2017	978-4-06-392102-1	May 15, 2018	978-1-63-236559-0
6	July 13, 2017	978-4-06-392120-5	July 17, 2018	978-1-63-236624-5
7	January 12, 2018	978-4-06-510687-7	September 18, 2018	978-1-63-236672-6
8	June 13, 2018	978-4-06-511393-6	December 4, 2018	978-1-63-236673-3
9	November 13, 2018	978-4-06-513777-2 (regular edition); ISBN 978-4-06-513509-9 (special edition w/ drama CD)	August 27, 2019	978-1-63-236726-6
10	April 12, 2019	978-4-06-515128-0	December 10, 2019	978-1-63-236843-0
11	November 13, 2019	978-4-06-516996-4	October 27, 2020	978-1-63-236914-7
12	July 13, 2020	978-4-06-519512-3	January 25, 2022	—

=== Novels ===
A novel adaptation written by Yui Tokiumi and published by Kodansha under the Kodansha KK Bunko imprint, with illustrations provided by Mikimoto.

No.	Japanese release date	Japanese ISBN
1	November 28, 2019	978-4-06-517237-7
2	November 28, 2019	978-4-06-517572-9

=== Film ===
In April 2019, the May 2019 issue of Bessatsu Friend announced that a live-action film adaptation was green-lit, with a release date of December 6, 2019, announced later in the year. The film is directed by Takehiko Shinjō and written by Haruka Ōkita, with a starring cast of Generations from Exile Tribe member Ryota Katayose as Kaede and Kanna Hashimoto as Hinana. Additional cast members include Gordon Maeda, Alissa Yagi, Kenichi Endo, Sae Okazaki, Katsuhiro Suzuki, and Wakana Sakai. The film's theme song is "One in a Million (Kiseki no Yoru ni)" performed by Generations from Exile Tribe. A tie-in commercial for Coca-Cola starring Katayose and Ayaka Wilson was produced for and featured in the film.

The film ranked #3 at box office during its opening weekend in 255 theaters nationwide in Japan, selling 159,000 tickets and earning approximately ¥194 million on its first day. On its second day, it sold an additional 121,000 tickets and earned approximately ¥144 million. The film earned a cumulative total of ¥613,484,200.

== Reception ==
Rebecca Silverman from Anime News Network complimented the artwork and the juxtaposition of the Cinderella fairytale but cited issues with some of the romance tropes used.

Kiss Me at the Stroke of Midnight was nominated for Best Shōjo Manga at the 43rd Annual Kodansha Manga Awards.
