= Rev. from DVL =

Japanese idol girl group

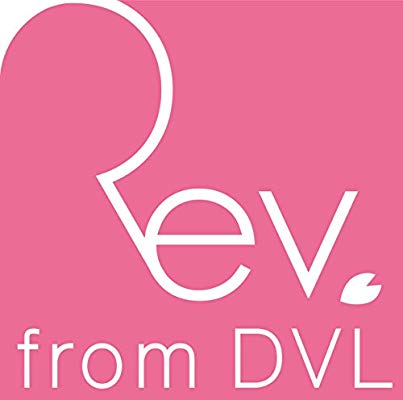

Background information
- Origin: Fukuoka Prefecture, Japan
- Genres: J-pop
- Years active: 2003–2017
- Labels: ACTIVEHAKATA (2006–2014); Yoshimoto R and C (2014–2016); Discovery Next (2016–2017)
- Past members: Kanna Hashimoto; Miki Washio; Nagisa Shinomiya; Hitomi Imai; Miho Akiyama; Nanami Takahashi; Yuna Nishioka; Nanami Chikaraishi; Honami Kamiya; Kyoka Motono; Yukina Hashimoto; Reina Fujimoto; Saki Furusawa; Airi Ikematsu
- Website: rev.jp.net

Rev. from DVL was a Japanese idol girl group formed in 2011, as a successor to vocal and dance group DVL. It was formed as a local idol group for major activities within Fukuoka Prefecture, and was managed under ActiveHakata.

== History ==
Rev. from DVL originated from a co-ed dance and vocal group formed in 2003, initially under the name "DVL", which stands for "dance", "vocal" and "love", but in 2011, with the rise in idol groups in Japan, it reformed as a girl group, and was renamed "Rev. from DVL", with "Rev." being the short form for "revolution", signifying the evolution from DVL's revolution concept.

Shortly after its formation, the group was to originally participate in activities within Fukuoka Prefecture. However, between October and November 2013, a photograph of Kanna Hashimoto went viral on the Internet, causing her and the group to achieve a higher level of popularity.

In June 2014, under Yoshimoto R and C, Rev. from DVL released their first single, "LOVE-arigatou-". With 13,000 original copies sold, it ranked sixth place on the weekly Oricon Singles Chart. Since then, the group released more singles, and had their own radio and television programs, and their popularity spread from Fukuoka Prefecture to the whole of Japan.

On February 6, 2017, Rev. from DVL announced that it would disband on March 31, 2017. They released their album, NEVER SAY GOODBYE -arigatou, and held a final pair of concerts in Tokyo and Fukuoka, on March 29 and March 31 respectively, prior to their disbandment.

== Members ==
=== Past members ===
- Miki Washio (鷲尾美紀, Washio Miki) (2003-2017)
- Nagisa Shinomiya (四宮なぎさ, Shinomiya Nagisa) (2006-2017)
- Hitomi Imai (今井瞳, Imai Hitomi) (2007-2017)
- Miho Akiyama (秋山美穂, Akiyama Miho) (2007-2017)
- Kanna Hashimoto (橋本環奈, Hashimoto Kanna) (2009-2017)
- Nanami Takahashi (高橋菜々美, Takahashi Nanami) (2009-2016)
- Yuna Nishioka (西岡優菜, Nishioka Yūna) (2009-2016)
- Nanami Chikaraishi (力石奈波, Chikaraishi Nanami) (2010-2017)
- Honami Kamiya (神谷帆南, Kamiya Honami) (2010-2016)
- Kyoka Motono (本野杏香, Motono Kyōka) (2011-2015)
- Yukina Hashimoto (橋本幸奈, Hashimoto Yukina) (2012-2017)
- Reina Fujimoto (藤本麗依菜, Fujimoto Reina) (2012-2017)
- Saki Furusawa (古澤早希, Furusawa Saki) (2014-2017)
- Airi Ikematsu (池松愛理, Ikematsu Airi) (2015-2017)

== Discography ==
=== Albums ===
Title	Peak chart position	Album details
Title	JPN Oricon	Album details
NEVER SAY GOODBYE -arigatou-	18	Released: March 8, 2017; Format: LP, digital download; Label: Discovery Next

=== Singles ===
Year	Title	Peak chart position		Release date	Album
Year	Title	Oricon Chart	Billboard Japan Hot 100	Release date	Album
2014	"LOVE-arigatou-"	6	35	April 16, 2014	NEVER SAY GOODBYE -arigatou-
2014	"Do my best!!"	11	64	August 13, 2014	NEVER SAY GOODBYE -arigatou-
2014	"REAL / Koi no Passion"	9	—	December 3, 2014	NEVER SAY GOODBYE -arigatou-
2015	"Kimi ga Ite Boku ga Ita"	9	96	March 25, 2015	NEVER SAY GOODBYE -arigatou-
2015	"Kimi wo Mitsuketa Ano Hi kara Boku no Omoi wa Hitotsu Dake"	4	—	June 30, 2015	NEVER SAY GOODBYE -arigatou-
2016	"Okujou no Sukima Shiroi Sora"	5	26	January 5, 2016	NEVER SAY GOODBYE -arigatou-
2016	"Vampire"	—	—	December 16, 2016	NEVER SAY GOODBYE -arigatou-
