= Say I Love You (manga) =

Japanese manga series

- First tankōbon volume cover, featuring Yamato Kurosawa (left) and Mei Tachibana (right)

好きっていいなよ。 (Suki-tte Ii na yo)
- Genre: Romance
- Manga
- Written by: Kanae Hazuki
- Published by: Kodansha
- English publisher: NA: Kodansha USA
- Magazine: Dessert
- Original run: February 23, 2008 – July 24, 2017
- Volumes: 18 + 1
- Anime television series
- Directed by: Toshimasa Kuroyanagi; Takuya Satō
- Produced by: Shinichi Ikeda; Tomoko Kawasaki; Sawako Hamano
- Written by: Takuya Satō
- Music by: Yūji Nomi
- Studio: Zexcs
- Licensed by: AUS: Hanabee; NA: Sentai Filmworks
- Original network: Tokyo MX, tvk, BS11, AT-X
- Original run: October 6, 2012 – December 30, 2012
- Episodes: 13 + 1 OVA
- Live-action film
- Directed by: Asako Hyuga
- Written by: Asako Hyuga
- Studio: Shochiku
- Released: July 12, 2014
- Runtime: 102 minutes
- icon

Say I Love You (Japanese: 好きっていいなよ。, Hepburn: Suki-tte ii na yo) is a Japanese manga series written and illustrated by Kanae Hazuki. It was serialized in Kodansha's shōjo manga magazine Dessert from February 2008 to July 2017, with its chapters collected in 18 tankōbon volumes. An anime adaptation by Zexcs aired from October to December 2012. A live action film adaptation premiered in July 2014.

In North America, the manga was licensed by Kodansha USA. The anime series was licensed by Sentai Filmworks.

== Plot ==
Mei Tachibana, a reserved high school student, has avoided close relationships due to a childhood experience with former friends whose behavior left her distrustful of others. Her life changes when Yamato Kurosawa, a popular classmate, shows interest in her. As their friendship develops into a romantic relationship, Mei gradually gains the confidence to form new connections with others.

== Characters ==
Mei Tachibana (橘 めい, Tachibana Mei)
Voiced by: Ai Kayano (Japanese); Caitlynn French (English)
Portrayed by: Haruna Kawaguchi
Mei Tachibana, traumatized by childhood bullying and false accusations from classmates, resolves to avoid friendships entirely. Though initially perceived as unsociable and awkward by peers, she possesses keen observational skills, kindness, and a dry sense of humor. Her perspective changes when developing a relationship with Yamato Kurosawa, through which she gradually learns to trust others and forms genuine friendships. Eventually pursuing a career in early childhood education, Mei channels her experiences into caring for others.
Yamato Kurosawa (黒沢 大和, Kurosawa Yamato)
Voiced by: Takahiro Sakurai (Japanese); Leraldo Anzaldua (English)
Portrayed by: Sota Fukushi
A popular student with many past romantic encounters. After Mei Tachibana mistakenly kicks him down stairs, he becomes interested in her unique personality. He protects Mei from a stalker by kissing her, beginning their relationship. Known for his selfless nature, he once slept with depressed classmate Aiko to comfort her. With Mei's support, he pursues photography as a career.
Asami Oikawa (及川 あさみ, Oikawa Asami)
Voiced by: Risa Taneda (Japanese); Monica Rial (English)
Portrayed by: Rima Nishizaki
A classmate of Mei Tachibana who struggles with unwanted attention due to her large bust. Resenting how others focus solely on her physique, she admires Yamato Kurosawa for defending her from harassment in middle school. She eventually forms a relationship with Takeshi after he demonstrates genuine interest in her personality. After high school, Asami pursues a career in early childhood education alongside Mei.
Takeshi Nakanishi (中西 健志, Nakanishi Takeshi)
Voiced by: Nobunaga Shimazaki (Japanese); Greg Ayres (English)
Portrayed by: Tasuku Nagase
A classmate of Mei Tachibana and close friend of Yamato Kurosawa. Known for his lewd behavior, he harbors strong romantic feelings for Asami. With Mei's assistance, he successfully confesses to Asami and enters a relationship with her.
Aiko Mutō (武藤 愛子, Mutō Aiko)
Voiced by: Yumi Uchiyama (Japanese); Carli Mosier (English)
Portrayed by: Rika Adachi
A brash yet kind-hearted classmate who develops unreciprocated feelings for Yamato Kurosawa after he praises her natural beauty. Her intense romantic pursuits lead to drastic weight loss with lasting physical effects. After Mei Tachibana supports her, they form a friendship, and Aiko later begins dating Masashi.
Masashi Tatekawa (立川 雅司, Tatekawa Masashi)
Voiced by: Junji Majima (Japanese); Clint Bickham (English)
Portrayed by: Ryosuke Yamamoto
Aiko's romantic partner who accepts her unconditionally, including during her previous struggles with weight. He becomes the sole person she feels comfortable revealing her body to without reservation.
Kakeru Hayakawa (早川 駆流, Hayakawa Kakeru)
Voiced by: Yuki Kaji (Japanese); Adam Gibbs (English)
A classmate who pursues multiple casual relationships in an attempt to emulate Yamato's popularity. His childhood friend Chiharu remains one of his few authentic connections. After his advances toward Mei Tachibana are rejected and he subsequently suffers an assault, he comes to value Chiharu's genuine care and begins a relationship with her.
Chiharu Ogawa (小川 千晴, Ogawa Chiharu)
Voiced by: Hisako Kanemoto (Japanese); Genevieve Simmons (English)
Kakeru's childhood friend who understands his true personality. After harboring long-standing romantic feelings for him, she eventually begins dating him when he reciprocates her affection. She works with Mei Tachibana at Bakery Farm.
Megumi Kitagawa (北川 めぐみ, Kitagawa Megumi)
Voiced by: Minako Kotobuki (Japanese); Emily Neves (English)
Portrayed by: Alissa Yagi
An amateur model transfer student assigned to Yamato Kurosawa's class. Initially presenting a kind facade, she secretly attempts to isolate Mei Tachibana from their friend group while pursuing Yamato. Haunted by childhood taunts about her appearance, she initially tries to buy friendship through gifts before reconnecting with childhood friends Momo and Asami. After accepting Yamato's devotion to Mei, she adopts a more self-assured attitude, symbolized by cutting her hair. She later temporarily relocates to Paris to pursue modeling and begins dating photographer Angelo Garcia.
Kai Takemura (竹村 海, Takemura Kai)
Voiced by: Tomoaki Maeno (Japanese); Andrew Love (English)
Portrayed by: Tomohiro Ichikawa
A former junior high classmate of Yamato Kurosawa who was severely bullied, causing him to repeat his first year of high school. Now physically stronger and more athletic, he shares a bond with Mei Tachibana through their mutual experiences of bullying. He frequents Mei's workplace, Bakery Farm, and enjoys visiting Land theme park. Though harboring unrequited feelings for Mei, he respects her relationship with Yamato and becomes protective of her. He briefly dates Rin Aoi before their relationship ends due to disagreements.
Rin Aoi (青井 凛, Aoi Rin)
A tall, outspoken model who replaces Megumi Kitagawa after her departure for Paris. Contrasting sharply with her petite, reserved brother Ren, she openly pursues a relationship with Kai, who gradually reciprocates her feelings. Their romance eventually ends due to unresolved differences, after which she focuses on her modeling career and achieves international success.
Ren Aoi (青井 蓮, Aoi Ren)
A reserved and gentle classmate of Takemura's grade level. Unlike his outgoing twin sister Rin, he maintains a quiet, antisocial demeanor and prefers playing video games. While harboring unrequited feelings for Mei Tachibana, he supports her fitness goals by assisting at the gym. Despite disappointment over Mei's relationship with Yamato Kurosawa, he contributes to her and Asami's career development in early childhood education.
Nagi Kurosawa (黒沢 凪, Kurosawa Nagi)
Voiced by: Mariya Ise (Japanese); Brittney Karbowski (English)
Yamato Kurosawa's younger sister, skilled in baking and crafting stuffed animals. Initially resentful toward Mei Tachibana for "stealing" her brother, Nagi later bonds with Mei over their shared experiences of being exploited by false friends. This connection leads Nagi to fully accept Mei while also forming her first genuine friendship with a classmate.
Daichi Kurosawa (黒沢 大地, Kurosawa Daichi)
Voiced by: Kazuya Nakai (Japanese); David Matranga (English)
Yamato Kurosawa's older brother. He operates a barber shop with a strict philosophy of creating original hairstyles rather than imitations. Haunted by his ex-girlfriend's death, he struggles to confess his feelings to his assistant Kyouko, who reciprocates his affection.
Miki Arai (新井 美樹, Arai Miki)
Voiced by: Saori Hayami (Japanese); Allison Sumrall (English)
A classmate rumored to be Yamato Kurosawa's first love, as she remains the only female student he has never kissed. While she actively pursues Yamato and flirts with him during a restaurant outing, he consistently rejects her romantic advances.
Mei's Mother
Voiced by: Yū Kobayashi (Japanese); Tiffany Grant (English)
A concerned parent initially anxious about her daughter's ability to find happiness. She strongly desires others to appreciate Mei Tachibana's true character. After observing Yamato Kurosawa's interactions with Mei, she becomes confident in his ability to care for her daughter. She keeps a photo of her late husband, who died of cancer, in her room.

== Media ==
=== Manga ===
Written and illustrated by Kanae Hazuki, Say I Love You was serialized in Kodansha's shōjo manga magazine Dessert from February 23, 2008, to July 24, 2017. Kodansha collected its chapters in 18 tankōbon volumes, released from August 11, 2008, to September 13, 2017. An additional 19th volume was released digitally on August 25, 2022.

The manga has been licensed for English release in North America by Kodansha USA.

==== Volumes ====
No.	Original release date	Original ISBN	English release date	English ISBN
1	August 11, 2008	978-4-06-365517-9	April 29, 2014	978-1-61262-602-4
Chapters 1–4
2	February 2, 2009	978-4-06-365542-1	June 10, 2014	978-1-61262-603-1
Chapters 5–8
3	August 10, 2009	978-4-06-365565-0	August 26, 2014	978-1-61262-604-8
Chapters 9–12
4	January 13, 2010	978-4-06-365585-8	October 14, 2014	978-1-61262-605-5
Chapters 13–16
5	July 13, 2010	978-4-06-365612-1	December 16, 2014	978-1-61262-606-2
Chapters 17–20
6	January 13, 2011	978-4-06-365637-4; 978-4-06-362179-2 (SP)	February 10, 2015	978-1-61262-671-0
Chapters 21–24
7	July 13, 2011	978-4-06-365655-8	April 28, 2015	978-1-61262-672-7
Chapters 25–28
8	January 13, 2012	978-4-06-365677-0	June 9, 2015	978-1-61262-673-4
Chapters 29–32
9	July 24, 2012	978-4-06-365699-2	August 25, 2015	978-1-61262-674-1
Chapters 33–36
10	January 11, 2013	978-4-06-365719-7	October 13, 2015	978-1-61262-675-8
Chapters 37–40
11	July 24, 2013	978-4-06-365744-9	December 15, 2015	978-1-63236-041-0
12	February 13, 2014	978-4-06-365762-3	February 23, 2016	978-1-63236-042-7
13	July 24, 2014	978-4-06-365780-7	April 19, 2016	978-1-63236-214-8
14	April 13, 2015	978-4-06-365806-4	June 7, 2016	978-1-63236-268-1
15	October 13, 2015	978-4-06-365836-1	August 2, 2016	978-1-63236-269-8
Chapters 57–60
16	April 13, 2016	978-4-06-365859-0	October 11, 2016	978-1-63236-302-2
17	October 13, 2016	978-4-06-365881-1	December 20, 2016	978-1-63236-303-9
18	September 13, 2017	978-4-06-365930-6	December 19, 2017	978-1-63236-441-8
19	August 25, 2022 (digital)	—	—	—

=== Anime ===
An anime adaptation by Zexcs began premiered on Tokyo MX October 6, 2012. The series later aired on tvk, BS11 and AT-X. It was later licensed by Sentai Filmworks for release in North America. The opening song is "Friendship" by Ritsuko Okazaki and the ending theme is "Slow Dance" by Suneohair. The limited edition of the eleventh manga volume, released on July 24, 2013, was bundled with an original animation DVD (OAD).

=== Film ===
The wraparound jacket band of the 11th volume of the manga announced in 2013 that a live action film was greenlit for release in 2014. The film was both directed and written by Asako Hyuga. Haruna Kawaguchi and Sota Fukushi were cast as Mei Tachibana and Yamato Kurosawa respectively. Additional cast members include Tomohiro Ichikawa as Kai Takemura, Rika Adachi as Aiko Mutō, Tasuku Nagase as Takeshi Nakanishi, Rima Nishizaki as Asami Oikawa, Ryōsuke Yamamoto as Masashi Tachikawa, and Alissa Yagi as Megumi Kitagawa. Asako Hyuga is directing and writing the film. The film was released in Japan on July 12, 2014. Its main theme song is "Happily" by One Direction.

== Reception ==
The manga has sold over 5.3 million copies by July 2014. The film earned ¥1.1 billion (US$10 million) at the Japanese box office.
