= Sailor Suit and Machine Gun (film) =

- Film poster
- Directed by: Shinji Sōmai
- Screenplay by: Yōzō Tanaka
- Based on: Sailor Suit and Machine Gun by Jirō Akagawa
- Produced by: Haruki Kadokawa; Kei Ijichi
- Starring: Hiroko Yakushimaru; Tsunehiko Watase; Akira Emoto
- Cinematography: Seizō Sengen
- Edited by: Akira Suzuki
- Music by: Katz Hoshi
- Distributed by: Toei Company
- Release date: 19 December 1981 (Japan)
- Running time: 112 minutes
- Country: Japan
- Language: Japanese
- Box office: ¥3.91 billion (Japan)

Sailor Suit and Machine Gun (Japanese: セーラー服と機関銃, Hepburn: Sērā-fuku to kikanjū) is a 1981 Japanese yakuza film directed by Shinji Sōmai, starring Japanese idol Hiroko Yakushimaru as the main character and based on the novel of the same name by Jirō Akagawa. It was released on 19 December 1981. A satirical take on yakuza films, the storyline involves a teenage delinquent schoolgirl named Izumi Hoshi who inherits her father's yakuza clan. The title is a reference to a scene where the main character shoots several rival gang members with a submachine gun, while wearing a sailor-fuku, the traditional Japanese school uniform.

Sailor Suit and Machine Gun is relatively well known in its home country, and spawned two television series based on and expanding upon its story, one in 1982, and one in 2006. Outside Japan, it is popular in some cult film circles, but has not garnered much mainstream attention. It has been released on Region 2 and Region 3 DVD, the latter being its first release that featured English subtitles. A "spiritual sequel", Sailor Suit and Machine Gun: Graduation, was released on March 5, 2016.

== Cast ==
| Character | (Japanese) | Actor | (Japanese) |
|---|---|---|---|
| Izumi Hoshi | 星 泉 | Hiroko Yakushimaru | 薬師丸 ひろ子 |
| Makoto Sakuma | 佐久間 真 | Tsunehiko Watase | 渡瀬 恒彦 |
| Masa | 政 | Masaaki Daimon | 大門 正明 |
| Hiko | ヒコ | Shinpei Hayashiya | 林家 しん平 |
| Mei | メイ | Toshiya Sakai | 酒井 敏也 |
| Tomoo | 智生 | Shingo Yanagisawa | 柳沢 慎吾 |
| Tetsuo | 哲夫 | Tatsuya Oka | 岡 竜也 |
| Shūhei | 周平 | Ken Mitsuishi | 光石 研 |
| Mayumi Sandaiji | 三大寺マユミ | Yuki Kazamatsuri | 風祭 ゆき |
| Hajime Sandaiji | 三大寺 一 | Rentarō Mikuni | 三國 連太郎 |
| Detective Kuroki | 黒木刑事 | Akira Emoto | 柄本 明 |
| Hamaguchi | 浜口 | Kazuo Kitamura | 北村 和夫 |
| Hagiwara | 萩原 | Minori Terada | 寺田 農 |
| Sekine | 関根 | Makoto Sato | 佐藤 允 |
| Ryuji Hoshi | 星 流志 | Kamatari Fujiwara | 藤原 釜足 |
| Dr. Oda | 尾田医師 | Hiroshi Madoka | 円 広志 |
| Detective | 刑事 | Yôsuke Saitô | 斉藤 洋介 |

== Reception ==
The theme song of the film, "Sailor Fuku to Kikanjū", sung by the lead actress, Hiroko Yakushimaru, stayed at the 1st place of the weekly Oricon Singles Chart for five consecutive weeks, from December 21, 1981 (issue date) to January 18, 1982 (issue date).

=== Box office ===
The film was released in a double bill with Moeru yūsha on 19 December 1981. Distribution income for the bill reached number one on the domestic market for the period including 1982, reaching ¥2.3 billion in distribution income, and totaling ¥3.91 billion in gross revenue.

=== Accolades ===
It was chosen as the 10th best film at the 4th Yokohama Film Festival.

| Award | Date | Category | Recipients and nominees | Result |
|---|---|---|---|---|
| Japan Academy Prize | 1982 | 話題賞 Work | Sailor Suit and Machine Gun | Won |
| Japan Academy Prize | 1982 | 話題賞 Actor | Hiroko Yakushimaru | Won |
| Japan Academy Prize | 1983 | Outstanding Performance by an Actor in a Supporting Role | Akira Emoto | Nominated |
| Japan Academy Prize | 1983 | Outstanding Achievement in Sound Recording | Kenichi Benitani | Won |
