= Jirō Akagawa =

Japanese novelist (born 1948)

- Born: February 29, 1948 (age 78); Fukuoka, Japan
- Occupation: Novelist
- Writing career
- Language: Japanese
- Period: 1976–present
- Genres: Mystery fiction, whodunit, thriller, horror

Jirō Akagawa (赤川 次郎, Akagawa Jirō; born February 29, 1948) is a Japanese novelist born in Fukuoka, Fukuoka Prefecture, Japan.

== Biography ==
Best known for his humorous mysteries, Akagawa's first short story, "Ghost Train", was published in 1976 and went on to win the annually granted All Yomimono New Mystery Writers' Prize by Bungeishunjū, a Japanese literary publishing company. Other works of his, The Incident in the Bedroom Suburb (ホームタウンの事件簿 私語を禁ず, Homu Taun no Jikenbo: Shigo o Kinzu) and Voice from Heaven (天からの声, Ten kara no Koe), were later made into anime, while Sailor Suit and Machine Gun (セーラー服と機関銃, Serafuku to Kikanju) was made into a popular live action movie. His most recognized works to date pertain to his Mike-neko (or Calico cat) Holmes series. He is extremely prolific; as of 2013, he had written more than 560 novels in the course of his thirty-year career, over 300 million individual published volumes.

== Works in English translation ==
Mystery novel

- Three Sisters Investigate (original title: San Shimai Tanteidan), trans. Gavin Frew (Kodansha International, Kodansha English Library, 1985)

Short story collection

- Midnight Suite (original title: Mayonaka no tame no Kumikyoku), trans. Gavin Frew (Kodansha International, Kodansha English Library, 1984)
  - The Car Park (駐車場から愛をこめて, Chushajo kara Ai o Komete)
  - The Wardrobe (我が愛しの洋服ダンス, Wa ga Itoshi no Yofuku-Dansu)
  - If I Were You (幸福な人生, Kofuku na Jinsei)
  - The New Man (見知らぬ同僚, Mishiranu Doryo)
  - A Dangerous Petition (危険な署名, Kiken na Shomei)

Short story

- Beat Your Neighbor Out of Doors (Ellery Queen's Mystery Magazine, March 1992)

Essay

- My Favourite Mystery, "And Then There Were None" by Agatha Christie (Mystery Writers of Japan, Inc. )

== Awards and nominations ==
- 1976 – All Yomimono New Mystery Writers' Prize (for unpublished short stories): "Ghost Train" (short story)
- 1979 – Nominee for Mystery Writers of Japan Award for Best Novel: Himatsubushi no Satsujin
- 1979 – Nominee for Mystery Writers of Japan Award for Best Short Story: "Zennin Mura no Mura Matsuri"
- 1980 – Kadokawa Novel Prize: Akusai ni Sasageru Rekuiemu (novel)
- 1980 – Nominee for Naoki Prize: "Uwayaku no Inai Getsuyobi", "Kinshu no Hi" and "Toho Jugo fun" (three short stories)
- 1980 – Nominee for Yoshikawa Eiji Prize for New Writers: Mike-neko Homuzu no Kaidan (novel)
- 1982 – Nominee for Mystery Writers of Japan Award for Best Short Story: "Kaidan"
- 2006 – Japan Mystery Literature Award for Lifetime Achievement

== Main works ==
=== Calico Cat Holmes ===
- Novels
  1. Mike-Neko Holmes no Suiri (三毛猫ホームズの推理), 1978
  2. Mike-Neko Holmes no Tsuiseki (三毛猫ホームズの追跡), 1979
  3. Mike-Neko Holmes no Kaidan (三毛猫ホームズの怪談), 1980
  4. Mike-Neko Holmes no Rapusodi (三毛猫ホームズの狂死曲（ラプソディー）), 1981
  5. Mike-Neko Holmes no Kakeochi (三毛猫ホームズの駈落ち), 1981
  6. Mike-Neko Holmes no Kyofukan (三毛猫ホームズの恐怖館), 1982
  7. Mike-Neko Holmes no Kishido (三毛猫ホームズの騎士道), 1983
  8. Mike-Neko Holmes no Yurei Kurabu (三毛猫ホームズの幽霊クラブ), 1985
  9. Mike-Neko Holmes no Opera Hausu (三毛猫ホームズの歌劇場（オペラハウス）), 1986
  10. Mike-Neko Holmes no Tozan Ressha (三毛猫ホームズの登山列車), 1987
  11. Mike-Neko Holmes no Poruta Gaisuto (三毛猫ホームズの騒霊騒動（ポルターガイスト）), 1988
  12. Mike-Neko Holmes no Shiki (三毛猫ホームズの四季), 1990
  13. Mike-Neko Holmes no Tasogare Hoteru (三毛猫ホームズの黄昏ホテル), 1990
  14. Mike-Neko Holmes no Hanzaigaku Koza (三毛猫ホームズの犯罪学講座), 1991
  15. Mike-Neko Holmes no Fuga (三毛猫ホームズのフーガ), 1991
  16. Mike-Neko Holmes no Keiko to Taisaku (三毛猫ホームズの傾向と対策), 1992
  17. Mike-Neko Holmes no Sinju Kaigan (三毛猫ホームズの心中海岸), 1993
  18. Mike-Neko Holmes no Ansokubi (三毛猫ホームズの安息日), 1994
  19. Mike-Neko Holmes no Seikimatsu (三毛猫ホームズの世紀末), 1995
  20. Mike-Neko Holmes no Seigohyo (三毛猫ホームズの正誤表), 1995
  21. Mike-Neko Holmes no Sitsurakuen (三毛猫ホームズの失楽園), 1996
  22. Mike-Neko Holmes no Sisha Gonyu (三毛猫ホームズの四捨五入), 1997
  23. Mike-Neko Holmes no Rinyuaru (三毛猫ホームズの大改装（リニューアル）), 1998
  24. Mike-Neko Holmes no Saigo no Shinpan (三毛猫ホームズの最後の審判), 2000
  25. Mike-Neko Holmes no Hanayome Ningyo (三毛猫ホームズの花嫁人形), 2001
  26. Mike-Neko Holmes no Kamen Gekijo (三毛猫ホームズの仮面劇場), 2002
  27. Mike-Neko Holmes no Sotsugyo Ronbun (三毛猫ホームズの卒業論文), 2003
  28. Mike-Neko Holmes no Koreikai (三毛猫ホームズの降霊会), 2005
  29. Mike-Neko Holmes no Kiken na Hiasobi (三毛猫ホームズの危険な火遊び), 2006
  30. Mike-Neko Holmes no Ankoku Meiro (三毛猫ホームズの暗黒迷路), 2007
  31. Mike-Neko Holmes no Sawakai (三毛猫ホームズの茶話会), 2008
  32. Mike-Neko Holmes no Jujiro (三毛猫ホームズの十字路), 2009
  33. Mike-Neko Holmes wa Kaidan o Noboru (三毛猫ホームズは階段を上る), 2011
  34. Mike-Neko Holmes no Yume Kiko (三毛猫ホームズの夢紀行), 2012
  35. Mike-Neko Holmes no Yami Shogun (三毛猫ホームズの闇将軍), 2013
- Short story collections
  1. Mike-Neko Holmes no Undokai (三毛猫ホームズの運動会), 1983
  2. Mike-Neko Holmes no Bikkuri-Bako (三毛猫ホームズのびっくり箱), 1984
  3. Mike-Neko Holmes no Kurisumasu (三毛猫ホームズのクリスマス), 1984
  4. Mike-Neko Holmes no Kansho Ryoko (三毛猫ホームズの感傷旅行), 1986
  5. Mike-Neko Holmes to Ai no Hanataba (三毛猫ホームズと愛の花束), 1988
  6. Mike-Neko Holmes no Purima Donna (三毛猫ホームズのプリマドンナ), 1989
  7. Mike-Neko Holmes no Iede (三毛猫ホームズの家出), 1992
  8. Mike-Neko Holmes no Sotsugyo (三毛猫ホームズの〈卒業〉), 1993
  9. Mike-Neko Holmes no Raibaru (三毛猫ホームズの好敵手（ライバル）), 1996
  10. Mike-Neko Holmes no Mujinto (三毛猫ホームズの無人島), 1997
  11. Mike-Neko Holmes no Kurayami (三毛猫ホームズの暗闇), 1998
  12. Mike-Neko Holmes no Koi Uranai (三毛猫ホームズの恋占い), 1999
  13. Mike-Neko Holmes no Senso to Heiwa (三毛猫ホームズの戦争と平和), 2002
  14. Mike-Neko Holmes no Yojinbo (三毛猫ホームズの用心棒), 2009

=== Three Sisters Investigate ===
- Novels
  1. San Shimai Tanteidan (三姉妹探偵団), 1982 (English translation: Three Sisters Investigate. Kodansha International, Kodansha English Library. 1985)
  2. San Shimai Tanteidan 2: Kyanpasu hen (三姉妹探偵団2 キャンパス篇), 1985
  3. San Shimai Tanteidan 3: Tamami, Hatsukoi hen (三姉妹探偵団3 珠美・初恋篇), 1986
  4. San Shimai Tanteidan 4: Kaiki hen (三姉妹探偵団4 怪奇篇), 1987
  5. San Shimai Tanteidan 5: Fukushu hen (三姉妹探偵団5 復讐篇), 1988
  6. San Shimai Tanteidan 6: Kiki Ippatsu hen (三姉妹探偵団6 危機一髪篇), 1989
  7. San Shimai Tanteidan 7: Kakeochi hen (三姉妹探偵団7 駈け落ち篇), 1990
  8. San Shimai Tanteidan 8: Hitojichi hen (三姉妹探偵団8 人質篇), 1991
  9. San Shimai Tanteidan 9: Aohige hen (三姉妹探偵団9 青ひげ篇), 1992
  10. San Shimai Tanteidan 10: Chichi Koishi hen (三姉妹探偵団10 父恋し篇), 1993
  11. San Shimai Tanteidan 11: Shi ga Komichi o Yatte kuru (三姉妹探偵団11 死が小径をやってくる), 1994
  12. San Shimai Tanteidan 12: Shinigami no Okiniiri (三姉妹探偵団12 死神のお気に入り), 1995
  13. San Shimai Tanteidan 13: Jijo to Yaju (三姉妹探偵団13 次女と野獣), 1996
  14. San Shimai Tanteidan 14: Kokochiyoi Akumu (三姉妹探偵団14 心地よい悪夢), 1997
  15. San Shimai Tanteidan 15: Furuete Nemure San Shimai (三姉妹探偵団15 ふるえて眠れ、三姉妹), 1998
  16. San Shimai Tanteidan 16: San Shimai, Noroi no Michiyuki (三姉妹探偵団16 三姉妹、呪いの道行), 1999
  17. San Shimai Tanteidan 17: San Shimai, Hajimete no Otsukai (三姉妹探偵団17 三姉妹、初めてのおつかい), 2000
  18. San Shimai Tanteidan 18: Koi no Hana Saku San Shimai (三姉妹探偵団18 恋の花咲く三姉妹), 2002
  19. San Shimai Tanteidan 19: Tsuki mo Oboro ni San Shimai (三姉妹探偵団19 月もおぼろに三姉妹), 2003
  20. San Shimai Tanteidan 20: San Shimai, Fushigi na Tabi Nikki (三姉妹探偵団20 三姉妹、ふしぎな旅日記), 2005
  21. San Shimai Tanteidan 21: San Shimai, Kiyoku Mazushiku Utsukushiku (三姉妹探偵団21 三姉妹、清く貧しく美しく), 2007
  22. San Shimai Tanteidan 22: San Shimai to Wasureji no Omokage (三姉妹探偵団22 三姉妹と忘れじの面影), 2011
  23. San Shimai Tanteidan 23: San Shimai, Butokai e no Shotai (三姉妹探偵団23 三姉妹、舞踏会への招待), 2013

=== Hayakawa family series ===
- Novels
  1. Himatsubushi no Satsujin (ひまつぶしの殺人), 1978 (French translation: Meurtres pour tuer le temps. Philippe Picquier Publishing. ISBN 2877302423, ISBN 287730387X)
  2. Yarisugoshita Satsujin (やりすごした殺人), 1987
  3. Toriaezu no Satsujin (とりあえずの殺人), 2000

=== Standalone novels ===
- Sailor Suit and Machine Gun (セーラー服と機関銃, Serafuku to Kikanju), 1978
- Marionetto no Wana (マリオネットの罠; lit. Puppet's Trap), 1981 (French translation: Le piège de la marionnette. Philippe Picquier Publishing. ISBN 2877301915, ISBN 2877303861)

== Film adaptations ==
- Sailor Suit and Machine Gun (1981)
- Detective Story (1983)
- Early Spring Story (1985)
- Who Do I Choose? (1989)
- Chizuko's Younger Sister (1991)

== TV drama adaptations ==
- Mike-Neko Holmes Series (1979 - 1984)
- Mike-Neko Holmes no Suiri (2012)

== Video game adaptations ==
Majo-tachi no Nemuri was an adaptation of two of Akagawa's works: Majotachi no Tasogare and Majotachi no Nagai Nemuri. Akagawa provided the original novel and did not supervised the script for the game. It was released for the Super Famicom in Japan on November 24, 1995. They were later re-leased with extra content as Majotachi no Nemuri -Kanzenban- in 1996 for home computers and for the PlayStation as Majo-tachi no Nemuri -Fukkatsusai- in 1999.

Yasōkyoku

- Akagawa Jirō: Yasōkyoku (PlayStation – 1998) (based on Akagawa's short story collection Satsujin o Yonda Hon)
- Akagawa Jirō: Yasōkyoku 2 (PlayStation – 2001)
- Akagawa Jirō Mystery: Yasōkyoku – Hon ni Manekareta Satsujin (Nintendo DS – 2008)

Others

- Akagawa Jirō no Yurei Ressha (Family Computer – 1991) (based on Akagawa's short story "Ghost Train")
- Tsuki no Hikari: Shizumeru Kane no Satsujin (PlayStation 2 – 2002) (based on Akagawa's novel Shizumeru Kane no Satsujin)
- Akagawa Jirō Mystery: Tsuki no Hikari (Nintendo DS – 2008) (based on Akagawa's novel Shizumeru Kane no Satsujin)

Unique Games

- Emit Vol. 1: Toki no Maigo (Scenario writing by Akagawa Jirō. Also bundled in the Emit Value Pack compilation)
- Emit Vol. 2: Inochigake no Tabi (Scenario writing by Akagawa Jirō. Also bundled in the Emit Value Pack compilation)
- Emit Vol. 3: Watashi ni Sayonara o (Scenario writing by Akagawa Jirō. Also bundled in the Emit Value Pack compilation)

== See also ==
- Japanese detective fiction
