= Attack on Titan: No Regrets =

Japanese manga series

- First tankōbon volume cover, featuring Levi Ackerman

進撃の巨人 悔いなき選択 (Shingeki no Kyojin Kui Naki Sentaku)
- Genre: Dark fantasy; Post-apocalyptic
- Video game

Kui Naki Sentaku
- Developer: Nitroplus
- Designed by: Gun Snark
- Genre: Visual novel
- Released: September 18, 2013 (preview); December 18, 2013
- Manga
- Written by: Gun Snark
- Illustrated by: Hikaru Suruga
- Published by: Kodansha
- English publisher: NA: Kodansha USA
- Magazine: Aria
- Original run: September 28, 2013 – June 28, 2014
- Volumes: 2
- Original video animation
- Directed by: Tetsurō Araki
- Produced by: Tetsuya Kinoshita; Shintarō Kawakubo; Kenji Sumiya
- Written by: Yasuko Kobayashi
- Music by: Hiroyuki Sawano
- Studio: Wit Studio
- Licensed by: NA: Kodansha Comics
- Released: December 9, 2014 – April 9, 2015
- Runtime: 22 minutes
- Episodes: 2
- icon

Attack on Titan: No Regrets (Japanese: 進撃の巨人 悔いなき選択, Hepburn: Shingeki no Kyojin Kui Naki Sentaku) is a Japanese manga series written by Gun Snark and illustrated by Hikaru Suruga, based on a visual novel of the same name. The series is a prequel spin-off of Hajime Isayama's popular Attack on Titan (進撃の巨人, Shingeki no Kyojin) manga. The story follows the character of Levi Ackerman before he joins the Survey Corps.

The series is published by Kodansha in Japan and by Kodansha USA in the North America. A two-part original animation DVD was released in 2014 and 2015.

== Plot ==
The story is a prequel to Attack on Titan that follows Levi during his days as a criminal in the underground city, when he was with his two best friends Isabel Magnolia and Farlan Church before Erwin Smith recruits him into the Survey Corps.

== Conception and development ==
Before Suruga began the manga, her editor-in-chief suggested that she visit the Metropolitan Area Outer Underground Discharge Channel so she could better visualize the Underground where Levi and the others live at the beginning of the story. It was while there that Suruga was first able to picture how large an 18-meter tall Titan actually would be.^{[vol. 1]}

While drawing Levi, Suruga attempted to make him appear younger than he does in Attack on Titan. She noted that his lack of emotiveness made it difficult to choose which expressions to give him while drawing.^{[vol. 1]} With Isabel, Suruga attempted to convey a "lively, energetic" character who, while "very cute", was just as capable at fighting Titans as anyone else.^{[vol. 1]} Suruga had difficulty drawing Farlan's face, as she wanted to give him characteristics that would clearly distinguish him from the other two main characters. Despite that, she found it surprisingly easy to copy the character's hairstyle from Namaniku ATK's original design.^{[vol. 1]}

== Media ==
=== Visual novel ===
Two visual novels written by Gun Snark (砂阿久雁, Sunaaku Gan) of Nitroplus, titled Kui Naki Sentaku [Yokoku] (悔いなき選択[予告], "A Choice With No Regrets: Preview") and Kui Naki Sentaku (悔いなき選択, "A Choice With No Regrets"), were released with the third and sixth Blu-ray sets of the Attack on Titan anime, on September 18, 2013, and December 18, 2013, respectively. The character designs were provided by Namaniku ATK, also of Nitroplus.^{[vol. 1]}

=== Manga ===
The series was written by Gun Snark and illustrated by Hikaru Suruga (駿河ヒカル, Suruga Hikaru). A prologue chapter was published in the November 2013 issue of Kodansha's shojo manga magazine Aria on September 28, 2013. The prologue was republished in the December issue on October 28, 2013, after the first issue to contain it quickly sold out. The series regular began in the January 2014 issue on November 28, 2013. Kodansha made the decision to increase the magazine's print run 5-fold (500%) due to the series' popularity, starting with the January 2014 issue. When they reprinted the issue on December 16, 2013, they increased the number of copies again, making the total print run a 10-fold (1000%) increase over the previously recorded monthly sales of 13,667 copies. A special chapter was published in the May 2014 issue of Kodansha's Monthly Shōnen Sirius magazine on March 25, 2014. The series ended in the August 2014 issue on June 28, 2014.

After the first volume was released, the decision to reprint it came on the same day. A booklet containing a set of character sketches and the prologue chapter was bundled with a special edition of the volume. A complete color edition containing the entire series would be released on December 5, 2017. Kodansha USA announced their license to the series at their New York Comic Con panel on October 11, 2013.

==== Volumes ====
No.	Original release date	Original ISBN	English release date	English ISBN
1	April 9, 2014	978-4-06-376961-6; 978-4-06-362271-3 (special edition)	June 24, 2014	978-1-61262-941-4
1. "The Wings of Freedom" (自由の翼, Jiyū no Tsubasa); 2. "One Arrow" (一矢, Isshi); 3. "... of Revolution" (変革の..., Henkaku no...); 4. "Proof" (証明, Shōmei); Bonus: "Prologue" (プロローグ, Purorōgu) (Note: The prologue chapter was not included in the original Japanese edition of the manga, and was instead published in a booklet that was released with a special edition of the first volume. It was, however, included in the English release by Kodansha USA.)
2	August 8, 2014	978-4-06-377046-9; 978-4-06-362277-5 (special edition)	October 28, 2014	978-1-61262-943-8
5. "Hearts" (心臓, Shinzō); 6. "Living Creatures" (生き物, Ikimono); 7. "Those Three" (3人, San Nin); 8. "Choices" (選択, Sentaku)

=== Anime ===
A two-episode original animation DVD adaptation was announced in the 14th volume of Attack on Titan. The OADs were produced by the same staff that produced the Attack on Titan television series. The episodes were directed by Tetsurō Araki and written by Yasuko Kobayashi, with animation by Wit Studio. Character designs were provided by Kyoji Asano. The insert song is "So ist es immer" (Just Like it Always is) by Hiroyuki Sawano. The OADs starred Hiroshi Kamiya as Levi, Daisuke Ono as Erwin, Kōji Yusa as Furlan, and Mariya Ise as Isabel. The first episode was included with the 15th volume of Attack on Titan on December 9, 2014, and the second episode was included with the 16th volume on April 9, 2015.

On January 15, 2016, Kodansha Comics announced that they would release the two episodes with the special editions of the 18th and 19th English volumes of the manga, on April 5, 2016 and August 2, 2016, respectively. On December 15, 2021, it was announced that Attack on Titan's OADs would be released subtitled by Funimation and Crunchyroll on December 19, with the dubbed release following in 2022. On May 2, 2022, it was announced that the dub will be released weekly starting on May 8, 2022. The No Regrets OADs were released from May 29 to June 5.

==== Episode list ====
No. overall	No. in series	Title	Directed by	Animation direction by	Original release date	English release date	Ref.
0.5A	1	"No Regrets: Part 1" "Kui Naki Sentaku (Zenpen)" (Japanese: 悔いなき選択 (前編))	Masashi Koeduka, Shintaro Itoga	Ayumi Yamada	December 9, 2014	April 5, 2016 (subtitled); May 29, 2022 (dubbed)	
Several years before Levi became Captain of the Scout Regiment, he lived in the Underground District where citizens never get sunlight and are not allowed to venture outside unless they get citizenship. He was part of a band of thieves alongside his junior partner Furlan Church. The two had gotten their hands on ODM gear and taught themselves how to use it for heists. They take in a teenager, Isabel Magnolia, after saving her from the guards for trying to get an injured bird back to the surface. One day, a mysterious man from the surface uses a hostage to ensure that the trio take on a job for him, promising them citizenship to live aboveground. During a heist, the trio is arrested by the Scouts, led by Erwin, whom Levi meets for the first time. Erwin offers to clear Levi and the others of their crimes in exchange for joining the Scout Regiment.
0.5B	2	"No Regrets: Part 2" "Kui Naki Sentaku (Kōhen)" (Japanese: 悔いなき選択 (後編))	Masayuki Miyaji, Shintaro Itoga, Tetsurō Araki	Megumi Tomita, Satonobu Kikuchi	April 9, 2015	August 2, 2016 (subtitled); June 5, 2022 (dubbed)	
Levi, Furlan, and Isabel begin their lives as Scouts. In reality, they joined to complete the assignment by the mysterious man, which is to assassinate Erwin and steal a document in his possession. During their first expedition with the Scouts, Levi and Furlan successfully get their first Titan kills. As a storm hits, Levi decides to use it to ambush Erwin, but discovers that Titans have killed his squad, including Furlan and Isabel. Devastated, he brutally takes down the last Titan. He then learns that Erwin had been carrying a fake document and the man who'd given them the assignment has been caught for his crimes; Erwin knew about Levi's mission from the start. Before Levi can break down, Erwin tells him not to regret his decisions as no one can tell the outcome, and tells Levi to stay with them. Levi figures that Erwin's goals are higher than he can see and decides to continue following him.

== Reception ==
The manga has over 1.5 million copies in print in Japan. The first volume of the manga had 500,000 copies in print by April 2014, having sold 140,186 copies within the first five days of its release. The volume was also the 57th best-selling manga volume in Japan in 2014. The first volume of the English translation appeared on the New York Times Manga Best Sellers list for 18 nonconsecutive weeks, while the second volume was on the list for 12 weeks.

Reviewing the first volume for The Fandom Post, Kate O'Neil gave it a grade of B. Noting Levi's status as a fan-favorite character, she wrote: "I often wonder at how much of the backstory in these spin-offs was the result of the original author's notes or the spin-off writer responding to the desires of the fanbase." She also commented that the art is "handled by someone other than the author, which means that characters are actually well proportioned and the perspective is solid."

== Works cited ==
- Vol. 1 (ch. 1–4): Suruga, Hikaru; Snark, Gun (2014). Attack on Titan: No Regrets 1. Kodansha USA. ISBN 978-1-61262-941-4.
- Vol. 2 (ch. 5–8): Suruga, Hikaru; Snark, Gun (2014). Attack on Titan: No Regrets 2. Kodansha USA. ISBN 978-1-61262-943-8.
