= List of Attack on Titan characters =

The Attack on Titan manga series features an extensive cast of fictional characters created by Hajime Isayama. The story is set in a world where humanity lives in cities surrounded by enormous walls; a defense against the Titans, gigantic humanoids that eat humans seemingly without reason. The story initially centers on Eren Yeager with his childhood friends Mikasa Ackerman and Armin Arlert who join the defense force to fight the Titans after their home town is invaded and Eren's mother is eaten. They are part of the 104th Training Corps, whose graduates assume different positions in the Military, including the Garrison Regiment, the Survey Corps and the Military Police Brigade. It is later revealed that the area where the Walls are located is an island called Paradis (パラディ, Paradi) and that it is the last territory of Eldia (エルディア, Erudia). There are other nations outside the island, namely Marley (マーレ, Māre), a nation on the mainland which declared war on Paradis.

== Main characters ==
Eren Yeager (エレン・イェーガー, Eren Yēgā; alt. Eren Jaeger)

The main protagonist & antagonist of the series, who, after witnessing his mother being devoured by a Titan while escaping his hometown as a young boy, dedicates his life to their eradication and joins the Survey Corps. After graduating fifth in his cadet class, he is swallowed by a bearded Titan during his first mission in Trost.^{[vol. 1]} However, he soon reappears as a 15-meter (49 ft) Titan who fights other Titans on equal ground.^{[vol. 1, 2]} Later on this is revealed to be because his father had killed the Reiss family and passed down the power of the Founding Titan and Attack Titan to Eren by having him eat him. Eren's ability as a Titan makes him the target of multiple parties that include those who see him as a tool to eradicate the Titans, other humans who can become Titans, and those who perceive Eren as a rebellion-inducing threat to the status quo.^{[vol. 2, 3]} Placed into the Survey Corps' Special Operations Squad, he attempts to control his Titan-changing ability and discovers he has other abilities as well. In the final arc, Eren, in order to fulfill his own corrupted view of freedom, unleashes millions of Colossal Titans in a genocidal crusade against the rest of the world that wipes out 80% of humanity. The Survey Corps and Marleyan Warriors unite to stop him, and Mikasa is ultimately forced to kill him. Prior to the battle, Eren explains to Armin in the Paths why he went through with his actions. Initially, Eren explained them as something that he did for his friends, but then, admitted simply wanting to see everything leveled down. After that, they tightly hugs in the paths and Armin promises Eren to be together-forever in hell to pay for their sins. Mikasa returns to Shiganshina with his head, where he is buried under the same tree he used to nap. Over time, the tree grew to resemble the tree where the organism that granted Ymir her Titan power lived. Author Hajime Isayama stated that Eren's Titan form's physique was modeled after middleweight mixed martial artist Yushin Okami.
Eren is voiced by Yuki Kaji in Japanese,^{[GB p.19]} and by Bryce Papenbrook in the English dub. In the live-action film, Eren is portrayed by Haruma Miura & Ryota Ozawa.
Mikasa Ackerman (ミカサ・アッカーマン, Mikasa Akkāman; alt. Mikasa Ackermann, Mikasa Azumabito)

Mikasa is Eren's childhood friend, who was taken in by his family after seeing her parents brutally murdered by human traffickers. She is shown to feel a strong sense of gratitude toward them, especially Eren, who had saved her life and given her his scarf. Her parents' tragic deaths had an overwhelming influence on her, causing her to lose her innocence and realize the world's cruelty. This caused her personality to become quieter and withdrawn, maintaining a stoic expression except when it comes to Eren and her friends. ^{[GB p. 36]} Mikasa joins Eren in the Survey Corps, determined to ensure his safety. She graduates from the Training Corps at the top of her class,^{[ch. 2]} and is regarded by officers as an unprecedented genius and prodigy.^{[vol. 3, 4]} As later revealed, this is due to Mikasa's father being a descendant of the Ackerman clan, an Eldian bloodline that was genetically modified to create super soldiers equal to a Titan in strength, originally designed to protect Eldia's king. When under duress, these genetically inherited abilities may allow a descendant access to their ancestors' battle experience. Mikasa's instincts were first awakened in the aftermath of her parents' deaths when Eren urged her to 'fight' back against her kidnappers.^{[ch. 6]}^{[ep 6]} Though technically half-blooded, she is also the last known person of Asian descent residing in the Walls. A wrist tattoo inherited from her mother indicates that she is descended from the prominent Azumabito family (アズマビト家, Azumabito-ke), a cadet Shogun branch from the Oriental nation of Hizuru (ヒィズル, Hyizuru), whose ancestors migrated from their native land to Paradis as honoured ambassadors.^{[ch. 6]}^{[ep 6]}^{[GB p.39]} While investigating Marley's volunteer soldiers with the Survey Corps, Eren lies to Mikasa that he has always hated her for being a slave to her Ackermann blood and being "forced" to protect him. In turn, she becomes despondent and removes her scarf from her neck. While still caring for Eren, Mikasa decides to join the alliance to stop Eren's planned genocide on the world. In the climax against Eren's forces, Mikasa is brought into Paths by Eren, showing her an alternate scenario where she and Eren ran away together following their conversation in Marley. Eren hugs her stiffly and asks her to forget about him once he is dead. Returning to reality, Mikasa refuses, and ultimately kills him to save humanity. She collects his head and returns it to Shiganshina to bury it under the tree. She continues to visit his grave until her own death many years later. In the author's blog, her name is noted to come from the Mikasa, a famous pre-dreadnought battleship of the Imperial Japanese Navy.
Armin Arlert (アルミン・アルレルト, Arumin Arureruto; alt. Armin Arlelt)
Armin is Eren's and Mikasa's other childhood friend. His parents tried to venture beyond the Wall by creating a hot air balloon but were found out and killed by the First Interior Squad of the Military Police, leaving Armin to be raised by his grandfather. Armin's grandfather secretly possessed an illegal book containing information about the world beyond the Walls, which Armin was fascinated by and showed to Eren, kindling their passion and desire to see the outside world. After the fall of Wall Maria, Armin's grandfather was sent along with 1/5 of the population (mostly Wall Maria refugees) on a high-risk operation to "reclaim Wall Maria" and died, leaving Armin an orphan. After joining the Training Corps with Eren and Mikasa, Armin initially had an inferiority complex regarding how he fell behind his companions in combat and endurance, but his confidence slowly grew as he realized he could use his brain and strategic abilities to help them.^{[ep 10]} During a battle in Shiganshina, Armin comes up with a plan to capture Bertolt but is mortally wounded from the severe burns he sustained.^{[ch. 82]} Levi saves Armin by injecting him with Titan serum instead of Erwin, and Armin then acquires the Colossal Titan's power by eating Bertolt.^{[ch. 84]} After investigating the Volunteers to learn Zeke and Eren's intentions, he is imprisoned in Shiganshina district by the Yeagerists. During the Marleyan ambush, he battles Pieck, before becoming horrified upon learning Eren's intentions to utilize the full Rumbling. After initially struggling with survivor's guilt, he joins the alliance to stop Eren from destroying all life outside Paradis, and later, after Hange's death, became the 15th commander of the Survey Corps. During the battle of Heaven and Earth, he was devoured by an Okapi Titan and entered the Paths, where he convinced Zeke to surrender his life to stop the Rumbling and gained the cooperation of past Titan shifters. Later, Armin was brought into the Paths by Eren, who revealed his true motivations. In the anime, Armin chastises Eren for his actions, before eventually comforting him, before the memory ends. After Eren's death, he was appointed alongside others from Paradis and Marley as an ambassador for peace.
Armin is voiced by Marina Inoue in Japanese,^{[GB p.20]}^{[ep 1]} and Jessie James Grelle in the English dub. In the live-action feature film, Kanata Hongō plays Armin. Inoue describes Armin as "withdrawn but slowly grows to the point where he's able to say what he believes".^{[GB p.20]}

== Paradis Island ==
Paradis (パラディ, Paradi) is a massive island on which the three Walls are located. It became the last territory of the Empire of Eldia (エルディア, Erudia) after the Great Titan War and hosts refugees mainly consisting of ethnic Eldians. The island is modeled after Madagascar.

The military within the Walls is divided into three divisions: the Garrison Regiment, the Survey Corps, and the Military Police Brigade. It is commanded by Darius Zachary, the premier of the government. Applicants into the Military are first required to enter the Training Corps, after which they are allowed to join one of the three divisions.

Darius Zackly (ダリス・ザックレー, Darisu Zakkurē; alt. Dhalis Zachary)
Darius is the commander-in-chief of the military and a premier. He first appears at Eren's tribunal where he assigns Eren to the custody of the Survey Corps after his identity as a Titan is revealed.^{[ch. 18]} After it was shown that the ruling nobles would abandon the people of Wall Rose should it be breached by Titans following a bold ploy by the Survey Corps, he pledges to support Erwin's plan to overthrow the monarchy and the true leading family, the Reiss family. Subsequently, the First Interior Squad in the castle was restrained by Darius's men and the noblemen on Rod Reiss's side were detained.^{[vol. 15]} In the Japanese anime, he is voiced by Hideaki Tezuka. In the Funimation version, his name is spelled Dhalis Zachary and he is voiced by John Swasey.^{[ep 14]}

=== 104th Training Corps ===
The Training Corps (訓練兵団, Kunren Heidan) is the branch of the military dedicated to training and educating new recruits to become members of the three military branches. Only the top ten graduates are permitted the privilege of applying to the Military Police Brigade and living within the Inner District. The other graduates can only choose between joining the Survey Corps or the Garrison Regiment. The Training Corps insignia is a crossing pair of swords.

The 104th Training Corps (第104期訓練兵団, Dai-hyakuyon-ki Kunren Heidan; alt. 104th Cadet Corps) is the only graduating class introduced in the series and the southern division contains nearly all of the central characters. It was active during 847 through 850 when the remaining recruits graduated. In the manga, the top ten cadets were listed by their individual ranks^{[ch. 2]}, but in the anime, the top ten are recognized as a group, along with Armin and Ymir.^{[ep 4]}

Keith Shadis (キース・シャーディス, Kīsu Shādisu; alt. Keith Sadies)
The instructor who is in charge of training the 104th Corps recruits. His face and head are cleanly shaven except for a patch of beard beneath his chin.^{[vol. 4]} Before the fall of Wall Maria in 845, he became the 12th Commander of the Survey Corps and struggled to establish a base beyond the Walls, with no success. Following a particularly taxing expedition he suffered a mental breakdown and resigned his post to his successor, Erwin Smith, becoming the first commander to pass on his position without dying. He was close friends with Eren's parents; especially his mother, Carla, whom he secretly loved.^{[ch. 71]} He was also the one to discover Eren deep in the forest after the Fall of Shiganshina, immediately following the moment when Eren's father passed on his Titan abilities to his son, and brought him back to safety.
In the Japanese anime, he is voiced by Tsuguo Mogami. In the Funimation English dub, his surname is spelled Sadies, but pronounced "Shardis". Patrick Seitz provides the voice.^{[ep 2]}
Jean Kirstein (ジャン・キルシュタイン, Jan Kirushutain; alt. Jean Kirschtein)
A hot-headed young man who speaks his mind, he initially planned to join the Military Police in order to live safely within Wall Sina and manages to graduate within the top ten of his class, ranking sixth.^{[ch. 2, 3]} He and Eren have opposing ideals; Jean thinks Eren is suicidal for wanting to join the Survey Corps and fight on the front lines, and throughout the manga has a simmering rivalry with him.^{[vol. 4]} In the Battle of Trost, he leads a group of recruits to preserve the safety of the supply house, but is shaken that his decision led to the deaths of some of his comrades.^{[vol. 2]} After his close friend Marco dies, he changes his mind about joining the Military Police and joins the Survey Corps instead.^{[ch. 18]} Jean later rises to become a commanding officer in the Survey Corps, and leads ground operations during the Raid on Liberio.^{[vol. 26]} He later intensely struggles with whether or not to stop the Rumbling or accept it and enjoy life in the Interior, but chooses to abandon his dream for the sake of saving the world, as he doesn't want his fallen comrades, particularly Marco, to be disappointed in him.^{[vol. 31]} Jean later joins the Alliance in the Battle of Heaven and Earth, fighting alongside Pieck and Connie, and becomes one of the final survivors of the series. He becomes an ambassador of peace of the Alliance. Isayama has said that Jean was one of his favorite characters because he says what he thinks.^{[GB p.44-45]} Jean also harbors jealousy toward Eren because of Jean's apparent infatuation with Mikasa; it is heavily implied that Jean has a crush on Mikasa. Jean can been seen covering his ears on multiple occasions, as a way to cope with the immense stress and pressure he is under.
Jean is voiced by Kishō Taniyama in the Japanese anime. In the Funimation English version, his last name is spelled Kirschtein and he is voiced by Mike McFarland. In the live-action film, he is portrayed by Takahiro Miura.
Marco Bott (マルコ・ボット, Maruko Botto; alt. Marco Bodt)
Ranked seventh of the trainee class, Marco is from the Jinae District and becomes close friends with Armin and Jean.^{[ch. 2]} He was known to be a "goody-two-shoes" and aspired to join the Military Police so he could serve King Fritz, only to end up being killed under mysterious circumstances near the end of the battle of Trost.^{[ch. 3, 15]}^{[vol. 4]} It is later revealed that it was due to him inadvertently overhearing Bertolt and Reiner talking about their Marleyan mission. Reiner tackles him and gives his vertical gear to Annie before leaving him to be partially consumed by a titan. Annie later uses his gear to cover up her killing of the captive Pure Titans, Sawney and Bean. Marco's death has a huge impact on Jean who subsequently abandoned his selfish attitude, as well as Reiner and Annie themselves, who still feel guilty about causing his death.^{[vol. 8]}^{[GB p.60-61]}^{[ch. 77]}
Marco is voiced by Ryōta Ōsaka in Japanese. In the English dub, his name is spelled Marco Bodt and he is voiced by Austin Tindle.
Connie Springer (コニー・スプリンガー, Konī Supuringā; alt. Conny Springer)
Connie hails from the Ragako District of Wall Rose.^{[ch. 15]} He sports a buzz cut^{[ch. 2]} and has an outgoing and upbeat personality, always trying his best to keep his teammates pumped up and not shying away from encounters with Titans.^{[ch. 3]} His training instructor describes him as having a good sense of balance and performing well with the vertical maneuvering equipment, but that he also has a slow mind and makes strategic mistakes.^{[ch. 18]} He is very close friends with Sasha Braus Jean Kirstein and Harry Sadler. Having ranked eighth in his class,^{[ch. 2]} he initially plans to join the Military Police but changes his mind after hearing Eren's speech,^{[ch. 3]} and eventually joins the Survey Corps.^{[ch. 21]}^{[GB p.46-47]} Later, his village is decimated by the Beast Titan and all of its inhabitants are turned into Pure Titans, including his mother. Connie ends up kidnapping Falco in an attempt to save his mother, but changes his mind last minute and saves Armin. Connie is traumatized when he kills his close friends Daz and Samuel to stop them from blowing up the flying boat. He is turned into a titan in the final battle of Heaven and Earth, but is saved when Eren is killed and is able to reunite with his mother. He is one of the final survivors of the series. He later joins the Alliance as an ambassador of peace.
Connie is voiced by Hiro Shimono in the Japanese dub of the anime. In the Funimation dub, his name is spelled Conny Springer and he is voiced by Clifford Chapin.
Sasha Blouse (サシャ・ブラウス, Sasha Burausu; alt. Sasha Braus)
Sasha is a hunter from the mountainous Dauper District.^{[ch. 15]} She is tall and lean, and her auburn hair is styled in a ponytail.^{[ch. 2]} She is noted as a proficient hunter skilled with a bow and has remarkable hearing and instincts, but she also has issues with structure and authority.^{[vol. 4]} She seems obsessed with food and was nicknamed "Potato Girl" (芋女, Imo Onna) for eating one during a military training drill.^{[GB p.60]} She joins the military after getting into an argument with her father when he tells her they must give up their traditional hunting lifestyle in the forest in favor of farming to support the large number of refugees moving to the area after the fall of Wall Maria.^{[ch. 36]}^{[GB p.48-49]} She manages to become a member of Captain Levi's Elite Squad with a number of her fellow 104th compatriots. While withdrawing from Liberio during her group's attack on Marley to acquire both the Warhammer Titan's power and Zeke, Sasha is fatally wounded when shot in the chest by a stowaway Gabi and utters "Meat" with her dying breath.^{[ch. 105]} She is later revealed to have formed a close friendship, possibly romantic, with a Marleyan prisoner of war turned chef named Nicolo. In a blog published by Isayama, Sasha was named after the British actor and comedian Sacha Baron Cohen to make her character more comedic.
In the Japanese anime, Sasha is voiced by Yū Kobayashi. In the Funimation English version, her family's name is spelled Braus and she is voiced by Ashly Burch in Seasons 1-3 and by Megan Shipman in the Final Season. In the live-action film, she is portrayed by Nanami Sakuraba.
Krista Lenz (クリスタ・レンズ, Kurisuta Renzu; alt. Christa Lenz)
A petite girl who is described as friendly, warm-hearted,^{[ch. 16]}^{[vol. 5:profiles]} and popular to the point where her peers regard her as a goddess. Her fellow comrade Ymir and even Reiner are both noted to be very fond of her.^{[GB p.50-51]}^{[ch. 24, 39]} Her true identity is Historia Reiss (ヒストリア・レイス, Hisutoria Reisu), the illegitimate daughter of Rod Reiss^{[ch. 41-42]}, the true King of Eldia. She lived on a farm owned by the Reiss family within Wall Rose, during which time she only had minimal interaction with her mother. Most notably a failed attempt to connect with her ended with her mother wishing that she had the courage to kill her child, and later on when her mother was killed by Rod's elite squad led by Kenny Ackerman, after the fall of Wall Maria, telling Historia that she wished she had never been born. Before Historia herself was killed, Rod Reiss attempted to spare her by ordering she assume the fake name 'Krista Lenz' and live among Wall Maria refugees.^{[vol. 12, 13]} Historia later joined the 104th Training Corps, presumably to kill herself due to feeling ashamed of herself and her true identity, where she ranked tenth in her class.^{[ch. 2]} Eventually, Ymir, a fellow comrade realized the "good girl" act she put on and made Historia promise to live for herself. She later participated in the defense of Trost in 850.^{[ch. 5, 11]}^{[GN p.50]} When Ymir revealed herself as a Titan to save her at Castle Utgard, Historia honored the promise they made prior by revealing and accepting her true identity as heir to the Reiss royal family.^{[vol. 12, 13]} Later, she and Eren were abducted by Rod Reiss and brought to his cavern where Titan inheritance ceremonies took place. As his only living heir, Reiss attempts to convince Historia to become a Titan and consume Eren to regain the Coordinate power of the Founding Titan. However, having learned of the Founding Titan's curse of renouncing war due to the 145th King Fritz's shackles, Historia refuses. She rescues Eren and helps the Survey Corps defeat her father after he transforms into a massive Titan, making the killing blow and securing her identity as the true ruler of Eldia.^{[vol. 16, 17]} Historia agrees to the Survey Corps' wishes to assume the throne and uses her status as Queen to relinquish most of her ruling duties to the military while using the money confiscated from disowned nobles to improve the lives of orphans and the homeless.^{[ch. 70]} Historia later accepts Hizuru's conditions to secure Paradis's safe 50-year long progression into the world stage by agreeing to succeed Zeke Yeager as the Beast Titan and to birth several heirs who would continue protecting Paradis in her stead.^{[ch. 107]}
Krista is voiced by Shiori Mikami in the Japanese anime. In the Funimation English version, her name is spelled Christa Lenz and she is voiced by Bryn Apprill.
Ymir (ユミル, Yumiru)
A member of the 104th graduating class and romantic partner of Krista.^{[ch. 36]} She remains distant from her other classmates and is both harsh and critical, maintaining an air of indifference. It is strongly hinted at that she held back her abilities during training so that Krista could place tenth in the Training Corps standings.^{[GB p. 52-53]} When titans attack Castle Utgard, Ymir transforms into a 5-meter (16 ft) chimpanzee-like Titan that, despite its smaller size, is nimble enough to take down several large titans with its speed, claws, and teeth.^{[ch. 41-42]}
Prior to the events in the series, Ymir was a nameless Eldian orphan living in Marley who was picked by a cult leader to pose as a royal descendant and religious figurehead. She was given the name Ymir after Ymir Fritz, and lived a peaceful life in comfort, worshiped by members of the cult. When Marleyan security forces later cracked down on the cult, she was scapegoated and sentenced to exile on Paradis as a Pure Titan. Ymir remained a mindless Titan for sixty years (an experience she later described as an "endless nightmare") until one day she chanced upon four teenage Marleyan Warrior infiltrators and devoured one named Marcel Galliard, who happened to possess the Jaw Titan. Consuming a Titan Shifter allowed her to return to her human form, and she decided to live this second life honest only to herself. She later joined the Training Corps and became close with Krista Lenz (Historia Reiss) of whom she is extremely protective. Having overheard church officials talking about Krista's true identity prior to joining the military, Ymir feels connected to her based on their shared past of bearing false names. She openly scolds Krista for living a "false identity" and tells her that the only way to enact revenge on those who hurt her is to live her true life with pride.
When she and Eren are later captured by Reiner and Bertolt, Marcel's friends who bore witness to his death, Ymir expected that she would be killed for stealing the Titan power of their friend and expresses guilt over it. She willingly submits to being taken back to Marley on the condition that she can "rescue" and take Krista with them. However, during the rescue operation to recover Eren, Ymir has a change of heart when Krista tells her that she will live only for herself and feels no fear when Ymir is at her side. No longer wanting to hand Krista over to Marley, Ymir instead leaves her behind and rescues Bertolt and Reiner from a horde of titans before they escape; she feels indebted to them since coming upon their group was the reason she became human again, even though returning to Marley with them will no doubt end her life.^{[vol. 12]} Some time after Krista becomes queen, Ymir sends a letter to her where she states her impending death, likely by another Warrior who will transform into a Titan and eat her to obtain the power she stole. She states that despite her inevitable death, she had no regrets, except from the fact that she was never able to marry Krista. This is later confirmed by Porco Galliard, who reclaimed his brother Marcel's power of the Jaw Titan.^{[ch. 93]}
Ymir is voiced by Saki Fujita in the Japanese version and by Elizabeth Maxwell in the English version.
Floch Forster (フロック・フォルスター, Furokku Forusutā)
A former 104th Training Corps cadet of the Southern Division and a fellow recruit of Eren's group who joined the Garrison Regiment after graduation (like most of the 104th cadets did). After the Survey Corps's uprising and Historia's coronation, he transferred to the Survey Corps as a new recruit where he questions Jean Kirstein during the feast on the eve of the expedition to Shiganshina District; he rhetorically asks whether Jean thinks the Garrison recruits are reliable since increased propaganda for the Scouts has painted them in a different, more positive light. During the operation to recapture Wall Maria, he was assigned to Squad Klaus along with his two friends Gordon and Sandra. He was the only known survivor in Erwin's suicide charge against the Beast Titan, and was the person who carried the mortally wounded commander back to Shiganshina to regroup with other survivors of the battle. After Erwin eventually succumbed to his injuries, he became one of the only nine survivors of the whole operation (the other eight being Squad Levi and Hange Zoe), and was personally decorated by Queen Historia. However, after learning the truth about the basement in Eren's home, he adopted a more vindictive and hateful attitude towards the people outside the wall (as shown by his total disregard for collateral damage during the Battle of Liberio four years later). He becomes a zealous supporter of Eren who he believes is the Eldian nation's only savior, and leads a faction called the Yeagerists which overthrows the previous government. After Eren's message to all of subjects of Ymir Floch declares that the Yeagerists seized the power over Paradis. When Floch learns about plans of an alliance of 104th Training Corps and Warriors to stop the Rumbling he takes Kiyomi Azumabito hostage in the harbour of Paradis, but stumbles on the alliance' resistance. When the alliance successfully drives away the Marleyan warship with the Azumabito's plane from the harbour, Floch silently sneaks to the plane (or to the ship) and shortly after shoots the plane's cove before getting killed by Mikasa.
Floch is voiced by Kenshō Ono in the Japanese version and by Matt Shipman in the English version.

=== Survey Corps ===
The Survey Corps (調査兵団, Chōsa Heidan; alt. Scout Regiment) is composed of expeditionary soldiers that venture outside the Walls. Their goal is to discover more about the origins and source of the Titans, their motives, and weaknesses; ultimately how to fight and defeat them. They are an integral component in the military's campaign to recapture Wall Maria. Due to this, the division suffers from a much larger casualty rate than the Military police or the Garrison Regiment; those that survive are some of the most elite veterans in the entire military. The Survey Corps's insignia is an overlapping pair of wings known as the "Wings of Freedom".

Erwin Smith (エルヴィン・スミス, Eruvin Sumisu)
The 13th Commander of the Survey Corps, who led the last mission before the fall of Wall Maria, having served the government even after they murdered his father as a child believing it was for the good for the people to conceal the truth of Paradis' establishment. He also made the difficult choices for the benefit of others, which required him to sacrifice the lives of his men to see it through; he has a reputation for gambling everything on unorthodox battle strategies. A shrewd, bold and charismatic leader who encourages creative thinking among his subordinates, Erwin developed the Long-Range Scouting Formation, which substantially reduced the Survey Corps' death toll during its expeditions (Despite this, the Scouts continued to suffer significant casualties). After learning of a mole among the military ranks, Erwin concealed this intel from his subordinates while orchestrating the 57th expedition to expose and capture Annie.^{[ep 20]} When Eren is kidnapped by Bertolt and Reiner, he leads a team to rescue him, having his right arm eaten by a Titan in the occasion.^{[ch. 49]} Once learning the government's actions were only for the benefit of the upper class, Erwin stages a bloodless coup d'état to place Historia into power. Erwin then leads an expedition to Shiganshina to seal the breach on Wall Maria, where he and his forces face the Warrior Titans. Erwin ends up being mortally wounded after resolving to sacrifice himself and the remaining recruits so Levi can attempt to kill the Beast Titan. Levi initially saw injecting Erwin with the Titan serum as the logical choice until realizing that Erwin continually demonized himself on their behalf, deciding to let Erwin die in peace from his injuries when giving Armin the injection. Ever since then, Levi has been on a hunt for the Beast titan Zeke to fulfill his promise to avenge Erwin.
He is voiced by Daisuke Ono in the Japanese anime, and by J. Michael Tatum in the English version.
Hange Zoë (ハンジ・ゾエ, Hanji Zoe; alt. Zoë Hange, Zoe Hans) (Note: Hange's name is arranged as "Hange Zoë" in the official translation of the manga published by Kodansha USA, as well as in the official Attack on Titan Guidebook: Inside & Outside^{[GB p.80]} and the Attack on Titan Character Encyclopedia,^{[CE p.28]} also published by Kodansha USA. It was reversed to "Zoë Hange" in the Funimation English dub. In Japan, the character's name has been romanized as "Hans Zoe" on the official anime website.)
Hange is a bespectacled Survey Corps veteran and the leader of 4th Squad. A scientist who studies the Titans,^{[ep 14]} Hange shows little fear when interacting with them, and is thus ecstatic when initially meeting Eren.^{[ch. 20]} Hange had a strong hatred against Titans until the discovery of Ilse Langnar's notebook, which provided some new insight into the unknown nature of the Titans. Hange also invents new special weapons for the Scouts to use, such as a barrel that fires multiple grappling hooks to capture Titans alive,^{[GB p.80-81]} as well as the Thunder Spears, a weapon instrumental to the later successful recapture of Wall Maria. In the aftermath of the battle of Shiganshina, Hange's left eye is lost because of shrapnel caused by the Colossal Titan's transformation and it was later covered up by an eyepatch. Hange succeeds Erwin as the 14th commander of the Survey Corps.^{[ch. 57, 85]} Following Eren's message to all Subjects of Ymir, Hange forms an alliance with the remaining members of the Survey Corps and the Warriors to stop Eren. Hange ultimately dies defending the members of the alliance from the Rumbling as they boarded the Azumabitos' flying boat. Before dying from burns and subsequent trampling, Hange successfully eliminates four Colossal Titans.
In the original English translation of the manga, Hange is referred to as female,^{[vol. 5]} and is also portrayed as one in the anime adaptation. However, in a blog post in 2011, Isayama responded to a question regarding Hange's gender, saying, "Perhaps [Hange's gender] is better left unstated". In 2014, Kodansha USA stated they went back through volume 5 and removed gender-specific pronouns they had used for reprint, and references from volume 6 onwards.
Hange is voiced by Romi Park in the Japanese anime, by Jessica Calvello in the English dub, and is portrayed by Satomi Ishihara in the live-action film.
Mike Zacharius (ミケ・ザカリアス, Mike Zakariasu; alt. Miche Zacharius)
A Survey Corps squad leader who has a peculiar habit of snorting and sniffing people when he meets them for the first time.^{[ep 14]}^{[ch. 19]} His strength is second to Levi among the Survey Corps squad leaders. When Wall Rose is breached by the Titans, Zacharius uses himself as a decoy to distract nine titans while his fellow soldiers escape. Zacharius manages to kill five of his opponents before he is intercepted by the Beast Titan. Zacharius is shocked to hear the titan speaking his language while being relieved of his gear, left to be devoured by the other three remaining Titans.^{[ch. 35]}
He is voiced by Kenta Miyake in Japanese. In the Funimation English dub, his first name was spelled Miche and he is voiced by Jason Douglas.^{[ep 14]}
Moblit Berner (モブリット・バーナー, Moburitto Bānā)
Moblit Berner was a veteran member of the Survey Corps and the vice captain (分隊副長, Buntai Fukuchō) of the Survey Corps' 4th Squad, and served as assistant and messenger for Hange, whom he knew since they joined the Survey Corps. An intelligent and responsible person, he is tasked to keep his overzealous and eccentric superior out of trouble, a job that leaves him in a state of near-panic much of the time, having to constantly pull Hange to safety. He is killed at Shiganshina when Hange's entire squad is caught by the Colossal Titan's steam blast, but pushes Hange inside a well at the last moment to save her life.
He is voiced by Rintarō Nishi in Japanese, and Jerry Jewell in English.
Ilse Langnar (イルゼ・ラングナー, Iruze Rangunā)
Resembling Ymir, Ilse was on the Survey Corps' 34th expedition with the task of taking detailed notes of her experiences outside the Walls. But she ended up encountering a trapped Abnormal Titan who mistook her for "Lady Ymir" and reached out to her in reverence. Ilse assumed the talking Titan could be beneficial for her work but she ends up having her head bitten off as a result of her unintentionally provoking the Titan enough for it to break free. As she was being eaten, she continually wrote about her experience being inside the titan's mouth. Her headless remain was then hidden by the Titan in a tree hole and eventually discovered by the Survey Corp, and her diary was retrieved and studied by Hange. Her story is recounted in the special chapter and an OVA titled "Ilse's Notebook" (イルゼの手帳, Iruze no Techō).^{[vol. 5]}
She is voiced by Sachi Kokuryu in Japanese, and Marissa Lenti in the English version.
Thomas (トーマス, Tōmasu)
Thomas is a member of the Survey Corps; he has dark hair and a goatee. He carries the news of the Titans breaching Wall Rose to Erwin and some of the citizens. During the crisis, he is seen encouraging people to evacuate promptly while attempting to regain his strength with a drink. ^{[ch. 36]}
Nanaba (ナナバ)
A member of the Survey Corps, Nanaba has short blond hair. She first appears during the 57th Expedition where she leads Krista's team in the forest used to ambush the Female Titan.^{[ep 18]} She has some supporting roles in the Stohess storyline, and leads part of the squad when the Titans have breached Wall Rose.^{[ch. 35]} She is eaten by the Titans when the latter invade Castle Utgard.^{[ch. 40]}
She is voiced by Asami Shimoda in the Japanese dub and by Lydia Mackay in the English dub.
Louise (ルイーゼ, Ruīze)
Louise is a young girl from Trost and the daughter of a Garrison officer. She, along with her mother, are among the many citizens who are trapped inside the city when the Titans threatened to invade Wall Rose, because the merchant Dimo Reeves was barring the gate with his cargo. Louise's mother assures her that her father will kill the Titans with cannons, but Louise spots an Abnormal Titan charging towards them. The Titan is swiftly slain by Mikasa Ackerman, who then proceeds to threaten Reeves to remove his wagon and clear the gate, allowing the citizens to leave Trost. As Louise and her mother express their gratitude towards Mikasa, Mikasa salutes them and Louise, ecstatic, salutes back.
Louise later joins the Survey Corps at some point after the recapture of Wall Maria, inspired by Mikasa, whom she has come to idolize, and takes part in the Raid of Liberio in year 854. When Eren is arrested for acting against orders, Louise is among a handful of sympathizers who leak the information of Eren's arrest to the public in order to try to force the military to release him. After they are found out, Hange Zoë arrests Louise and her compatriots, and Louise is disappointed to learn she will not be staying in the same cell that Mikasa was imprisoned in. She is later freed by fellow sympathizers (called the "Yeagerists"), and meets with a jailbreaking Eren. She later passes away due to a shard of thunder spear lodged in her stomach.
She is voiced by Mariko Nagai in the Japanese version and by Amanda Lee in the English dub.
Holger (ホルガー, Horugā)
Holger is a Survey Corps soldier before defecting to side with Eren Yeager and his group of rebels known as the Yeagerists.
Wim (ヴィム, Vimu)
Wim is a Survey Corps soldier before defecting to side with Eren Yeager and his group of rebels known as the Yeagerists.

==== Special Operations Squad ====
The Survey Corps Special Operations Squad (調査兵団特別作戦班, Chōsa Heidan Tokubetsu Sakusen-han), also known as Squad Levi (リヴァイ班, Rivai-han), is a squad of four elite soldiers with impressive combat records hand-picked by Captain Levi. The squad takes Eren under their wing as both his bodyguards and potential executors if he goes berserk. All the original members of the squad, except for Levi and Eren, are killed by the Female Titan during the 57th expedition to Wall Maria. Later on, the squad is reformed with the six remaining recruits from the 104th Training Corps.

Levi Ackerman (リヴァイ・アッカーマン, Rivai Akkāman; alt. Levi Ackermann)

He is known as humanity's most powerful soldier and head of an elite squad in the Survey Corps. Hange remarks that he is a bit of a "clean freak". While it is said that he is blunt and unapproachable, it is noted that he has a strong respect for authority, structure and discipline. The side story Attack on Titan: No Regrets focuses on Levi's origins, revealing that he was part of a band of thieves using the Vertical Maneuvering Equipment to commit crimes before he is scouted by Erwin to join the army. Captain Kenny Ackerman later notes that the capture of Eren and Historia has to do with Levi, whom he refers to as "Levi Ackerman".^{[ch. 56]} Kenny is later revealed to be Levi's maternal uncle, who raised him after his mother Kuchel's death. Levi becomes a mentor to Eren and his friends and often guides and fights alongside them. After Erwin's death at the hands of Zeke Jaegar, Levi resolves to hunt him down, and each time they have an encounter, Levi defeats him every time. They even formed an uneasy alliance to deceive Marley. Later, Levi is injured by an explosion engineered by Zeke. He was in a near-death state until Hange Zoe found him and escaped with his body later to make an alliance with Commander Theo Magath and Pieck Finger in order to take down Eren Jaeger, with the loss of his eye, fingers, and legs, rendering him paralyzed. Eventually, Levi recovers and joins the others in battle, managing to kill Zeke, fulfilling his promise to Erwin in killing the Beast Titan, becoming one of the final survivors of the series. Levi was modeled after the Watchmen character Rorschach and is named after a child Isayama noticed in the documentary Jesus Camp. Levi is voiced by Hiroshi Kamiya and by Matthew Mercer in the English dub.
Eld Jinn (エルド・ジン, Erudo Jin; alt. Eld Gin)
Deputy leader of the Special Operations Squad, who possesses a calm demeanor, having a record of 14 Titan kills and 32 assists.^{[ep 15]}^{[ch. 26]} After the Female Titan is initially captured and assumed to be devoured, Eld leads the Squad to protect Eren in their retreat, but when the Female titan reappears, she kills Eld.^{[ep 21]}^{[ch. 28]} He is voiced by Susumu Chiba in Japanese. In the Funimation English dub, his name is spelled Eld Gin and he is voiced by Vic Mignogna.^{[ep 15]}
Oluo Bozado (オルオ・ボザド, Oruo Bozado; alt. Oruo Bozad)
Bozado is a soldier who is introduced with 39 Titan kills and 9 assists.^{[ep 15]}^{[ch. 26]} He is depicted as arrogant and boastful, although there is a running gag that whenever he is bragging while on his horse, he literally bites his tongue.^{[ep 15]}^{[ep 17]}^{[ch. 20, 22]} Despite helping disable the Female Titan, he is eventually killed by one of her roundhouse kicks.^{[ep 21]}^{[ch. 28]} He is voiced by Shinji Kawada in Japanese. In the Funimation version, his name is spelled Oruo Bozad and he is voiced by Chris Smith.^{[ep 15]}
Petra Ral (ペトラ・ラル, Petora Raru; alt. Petra Rall)
Petra is a skilled and experienced fighter, introduced with having killed 58 Titans (10 solo, 48 assists).^{[ep 15]}^{[ch. 26]} She too is killed by the regenerated Female Titan, after trying to flee and getting kicked into a tree.^{[ep 21]}^{[ch. 28]}^{[ch. 30]} She is voiced by Natsuki Aikawa in the Japanese version. In the Funimation English dub, her name is spelled Petra Rall and she is voiced by Caitlin Glass.^{[ep 15]}
Günther Schultz (グンタ・シュルツ, Gunta Shurutsu)
Günther is a soldier who has logged 47 Titan kills, 7 solo.^{[ep 15]}^{[ch. 26]} On the 57th expedition to the lands outside the wall, he is ambushed and killed during the retreat in the forest by Annie in her human form (using the vertical maneuvering equipment stolen from Marco).^{[ep 21]}^{[ch. 28]} Gunther is voiced by Kozo Mito in the Japanese version and by Brett Weaver in the English version.^{[ep 15]}

=== Garrison Regiment ===
The Garrison Regiment (駐屯兵団, Chūton Heidan) are the soldiers that protect the towns and reinforce the Walls. They are the first line of defense against the Titans, maintaining a defensive stance. They are the largest force in the military due to the small exclusive number of members in the Military Police Brigade and the high death rate of the Survey Corps. The Garrison Regiment's insignia is a pair of red roses.

Hannes (ハンネス, Hannesu)
A Garrison soldier who saves Eren and Mikasa during the attack on Shiganshina.^{[ch. 1]} While Eren finishes cadet training, Hannes becomes a Garrison squad leader. He seeks to repay a debt to the Yeager Family for saving his own wife and family from a deadly disease.^{[ch. 3]}^{[GB p.66-67]} Hannes assisted Mikasa and the other Survey Corps in rescuing Eren from Reiner and Bertolt. He later died fighting the Titan that ate Eren's mother.^{[ch. 50]} Isayama said that Hannes and the Garrison Soldiers in volume 1 resemble him the most as they sit around and drink booze. He is voiced by Keiji Fujiwara (Season 1) and Kenjiro Tsuda (Season 2) in the Japanese version and by David Wald in the English version.
Dot Pixis (ドット・ピクシス, Dotto Pikushisu; alt. Dot Pyxis)
Dot Pixis is a man with a moustache and no hair who is the highest-ranking commander of the Southern Territory.^{[ch. 12]} He is sometimes viewed as eccentric.^{[ch. 12]} Upon learning about the breach at Trost, he and his men stop Captain Woerman from shooting Eren after the latter is revealed to be able to transform into a Titan.^{[ch. 11]} He then mobilizes his soldiers in a mission to protect Eren during the latter's attempt to seal the wall.^{[ch. 12]} He appears later in the series to support Erwin's plan to overthrow the monarchy starting with assisting in the hoax that Wall Rose was breached by the Colossal Titan and the Armored Titan.^{[ch. 55]} In a 2010 post on his blog, Isayama stated he modeled Dot Pixis after Imperial Japanese Army General Akiyama Yoshifuru. However, this raised a heated discussion and death threats on his blog in 2013, with angry participants questioning Akiyama's participation or lack thereof in the Sino-Japanese War and the Imperial Japanese rule over Korea. Pixis is voiced by Masahiko Tanaka in Japanese. In the Funimation English version, his last name is spelled Pyxis and he is voiced by R. Bruce Elliott.
Rico Brzenska (リコ・ブレツェンスカ, Riko Buretsensuka)
Rico Brzenska is the team leader of Squad Rico and a member of the Garrison's 1st Division Elite Forces.^{[ch. 10]} She is the sole surviving leader of the Alpha Squad assigned to defend Eren during the liberation of Trost District from the Titans. At first, it may appear as though she does not feel sympathy as she was very open to the idea of killing Eren, Mikasa, and Armin after it was discovered that Eren has the power of the Titans. Later, she began to lose her calm demeanor as the Titans gradually wiped out her comrades.^{[ch. 14]} However, for the most part, she maintains a composed leadership role, and bravely cuts a Titan's eye out when it interferes with Eren's carrying the boulder. Once Trost is reclaimed, Rico sits among the wasteland of corpses and begins to shed tears for her fallen comrades, and for the first victory for humanity over the Titans.^{[ch. 19]} She, Ian Dietrich and Mitabi Jarnach were in the same training corps class. Brzenska's last name is traditionally a Polish surname in origin. She is voiced by Michiko Kaiden in Japanese and Morgan Garrett in the English Funimation dub.^{[ep 9]}

=== Military Police Brigade ===
The Military Police Brigade (憲兵団, Kenpeidan; alt. Military Police Regiment) is a gendarmerie assigned to maintain law enforcement, supervise the Training Corps, surveil the Garrison Regiment, control the fire departments, and arrest and detain political criminals and dissidents. The top ten of each training class are eligible to join, although some experienced veterans from the Garrison can also transfer. As their tasks mainly involve urban patrols and administrative work, they do not experience front-line combat with Titans and often reside in the comfort and safety of the innermost wall.^{[vol. 8]} The Military Police Brigade's insignia is a white-haired green unicorn.

Nile Dok (ナイル・ドーク, Nairu Dōku; alt. Nile Dawk^{[ep 14]})
Commander of the Military Police Brigade. During Eren's tribunal, Nile pleaded the side that Eren should be handed to the Military Police Brigade for examination and then executed, believing Eren's presence in the populace would cause a civil war.^{[ch. 18]} When Eren called him a coward, he wanted Eren to be shot, but Levi stopped him. When the Female Titan suddenly appeared within Wall Sheena, Nile angrily demands an explanation from Erwin, suspecting he is planning a coup. But after learning about Erwin's plans, he decides to help by ordering the Military Police to assist the Survey Corps in capturing the Female Titan.^{[ep 25]} In the English version, his name is spelled Nile Dawk.
In the anime, Nile is voiced by Anri Katsu in Japanese and by Ian Sinclair in English.
Marlowe Freudenberg (マルロ・フロイデンベルク, Maruro Furoidenberuku; alt. Marlo Freudenberg)
Marlowe is introduced during the Raid of Stohess District storyline as a Military Police member who is given a bit of leadership responsibility.^{[ch. 31]} He is aware of the corruption in the organization and desires to reform it, although that draws some criticism from Annie.^{[ch. 31]} In the anime series, he tries to demonstrate his leadership in a different way; he tries to stand up against two corrupt superiors who are selling guns on the black market, where Annie then encourages Marlowe to keep gathering his strength.^{[ep 23]} After the battle between the Female and Attack Titan, he and Hitch are seen cleaning up dead bodies.
In a later manga storyline, on patrol, he defends the Survey Corps, stating they had just caught a Titan, which is something no one else in the other military factions has done.^{[ch. 59]} When they are caught by Levi's squad, Marlowe wants to help them out, but Levi refuses, stating they can't be trusted. He and Hitch are left in Jean's custody. Deciding to test him, Jean gets into a brief fist fight with Marlowe. The latter tells Hitch to run and that he'll hold him off. After a while, Jean decides he can be trusted and Marlowe's want for justice is similar to Eren's^{[ch. 59]}, echoing Annie's earlier observation. However, Hitch returns and attacks him, still thinking he plans on killing Marlowe. Marlowe then tells her it was just a test. He is among a number of soldiers who transfer into the Survey Corps to help strengthen the dwindling numbers despite Hitch trying to convince him otherwise.^{[ch. 70]} He is among the soldiers killed during the attempt to retake Wall Maria, being struck in the head by a rock while distracting the Beast Titan in an attempt to allow Levi to ambush it.^{[ch. 81]}
He is oblivious to the fact that Hitch has feelings for him, despite it being very obvious (and the reason she tried to get him to stay with the Military Police). When he first transfers into the Corps and is having dinner with Eren's group, he is teased by them for this obliviousness and seems surprised that Hitch would be romantically interested in him. He later appears to come to the realization that he returns Hitch's feelings; however, he is killed shortly thereafter.
In the Japanese dub of the anime, Marlowe is voiced by Tomokazu Sugita. In the English dub, his name is spelled Marlo Freudenberg and is voiced by Todd Haberkorn.^{[ep 23]}
Hitch Dreyse (ヒッチ・ドリス, Hitchi Dorisu)
Annie's, Marlowe's, and Boris's female comrade in the Military Police, she likes to poke fun at both Annie and Marlowe. She is also Annie's roommate.^{[ep 23]}: She is voiced by Akeno Watanabe in the Japanese dub and by Brittney Karbowski in the English dub.^{[ep 23]} Hitch is implied to have only got in the Military Police by having an improper relationship with a superior in order to gain a favorable position. Both she and Marlowe are involved in the cleanup in the capital after the fight between the Female and Attack Titan. When the two of them are captured by Levi's group, she frantically asks where Annie is, implying that Hitch actually cares about Annie and the teasing is probably a cover-up. She learns the truth and is left in Jean's custody. When Jean pretends to kill them, Marlowe fights back and tells Hitch to run to safety, but she returns with a stick to attack Jean, hoping to save Marlowe. However, Marlowe stops her, stating that Jean was just testing them. Hitch remains in the Military Police after the incident, trying to persuade Marlowe in vain not to transfer to the Survey Corps. She later discovers Annie escaping from the underground, and assists her in heading to Shiganshina District. She's heavily implied to have had a crush on Marlowe, giving a reason for why she picked on him.
Boris Feulner (ボリス・フォイルナー, Borisu Foirunā)
One of the nicer members of the Military Police who is kind to Annie. He's in the same squad as her, Hitch, and Marlo(we).^{[ep 23]} He is voiced by Yūichi Karasuma in the Japanese dub and by Micah Solusod in the English version.^{[ep 23]} Boris respects Annie since she fought during the Battle of Trost, therefore resulting in her being the only member in the squad who has combat experience and an actual encounter with Titans. However, he doesn't like Hitch's misconduct towards Annie and quickly points out her flaws, including the fact that Hitch didn't earn her position like Annie did, instead sleeping her way to the top. While Boris is aware of the corruption within the Military Police, he chooses to accept that it's part of the system. When Marlowe declares his ambition to reform the system by rising through the top, he unenthusiastically wishes him good luck.^{[ep 23]}

==== First Interior Squad ====
The First Interior Squad (中央第一憲兵団, Chūō daiichi Kenpeidan), also known as the Interior Police, is a secret police division that, despite being under the Military Police organization in name, operates completely independently from the main body of the Military Police Brigade. They have been shown to be far more skilled and disciplined than the rest of the Military Police, though their main specialties are in fighting other humans rather than Titans. No one is officially overseeing their activities and they operate as if above the law; even Nile Dok is often unaware of their actions until he was informed by someone else. That person turned out to be Rod Reiss. Shrouded in mystery, the Interior Squad is involved in numerous conspiracies involving torture and assassinations to maintain order within the Walls and is rarely seen outside the capitol. While most of the operatives are dead during the conflict with Rod Reiss, the rest of them are restrained by the soldiers on the side of Dot Pyxis and Dhalis Zachary.

Kenny Ackerman (ケニー・アッカーマン隊長, Kenī Akkāman-taichō; alt. Kenny Ackermann)
Serving directly under the Reiss family, Kenny Ackerman leads the Anti-Personnel Control Squad (対人制圧部隊, Taijin Seiatsu Butai), an elite counterinsurgency unit equipped with Vertical Maneuvering Equipment and slug guns specifically designed for killing humans. Kenny was also the man who murdered Historia's mother Alma sometime after the incident of Wall Maria.^{[ch. 56]} In the past, he lived a rough life because the Ackerman clan were forced to live in the Underground City, as the Reiss family condemned them as a threat since they are immune to the Founding Titan's controlling power. He is the maternal uncle of Levi through his younger sister Kuchel, who was forced into prostitution and eventually died of a venereal illness, and raised young Levi for a short time until the latter awakened his Ackerman abilities. Prior to serving the Reiss family, Kenny was an infamous criminal hitman nicknamed "Kenny the Ripper" (切り裂きケニー, Kirisaki Kenī) and murdered Military Police officers. He then attempted to assassinate Uri, but pledged his loyalty when the latter expressed resentment towards the Ackerman persecution and personally repented for forgiveness from Kenny. After Uri passed on the Titan power to his niece Frieda, Kenny continued serving Rod, but only out of his deep respect towards his late friend Uri.
After the incident with the Female Titan, Kenny personally leads the Interior Police against the Survey Corps and ambushes Levi's team, and kidnaps Eren and Historia under orders from Rod. He is shot by Levi with a musket during the fight, but survives unscathed thanks to his body armor. He later fights his nephew again, defending the Reiss chapel from Squad Levi, but is forced to flee after being injured. After learning of Rod's intentions for Historia, Kenny decides to betray Rod by partially freeing Eren so he can fight back.^{[ch. 64]} After Rod transforms into a Titan, Kenny is fatally wounded by falling boulders when the chapel collapses. In his final moments, Kenny reveals their familial ties to Levi and gives him a vial of Titan serum, which Levi later used to save Armin at Shiganshina.^{[ch. 84]}
Kenny is voiced by Kazuhiro Yamaji in the Japanese version of anime and by Phil Parsons in the English version.^{[ep 38]}^{[ch. 84]}
Traute Carven (トラウテ・カーフェン, Toraute Kāfen)
The second-in-command of the Anti-Personnel Control Squad and the loyal lieutenant of Kenny Ackerman. Traute is later killed by the collapsing cave under the Reiss chapel.
She is voiced by Saori Terai in Japanese and by Stephanie Young in English.
Djel Sanes (ジェル・サネス, Jeru Sanesu)
A member of the First Interior Squad, Djel is introduced when he informs the Survey Corps that Minister Nick was killed by a robber. Hange determines that Sanes and his partner had tortured and murdered Minister Nick given that his fist had its skin ripped off.^{[ch. 52]}

=== Ruling family ===
Fritz (フリッツ, Furittsu)
King Fritz is the ruler of Wall Sheena who is spoken about by different characters, but is actually a puppet ruler serving as a decoy for Rod Reiss, the real King of the Walls. He first appears in the Uprising Arc during a conference with four other people where one of them is a member of the Military Police Brigade. Fritz does not wear his crown during this conference, but instead leaves it on the table beside him along with a bottle of alcohol. Fritz presided over the trial of Erwin Smith where he was dozing through it as the other nobles actually conducted the trial. He is later exposed by the Survey Corps with the help of Nile Dok and Commander Pyxis. When Dhalis Zachary interrupts the trial and most of the First Interior Squad are restrained by the soldiers of Zachary's side, Aurille angrily kicks the throne as Fritz (who is sleeping with his eyes open the whole time) gets a rude awakening and confusedly asks if it is time to eat. Aurille tells him to shut up as Aurille is restrained. Fritz is taken away while the rest of the nobles are arrested.^{[ch. 64]}
Fritz is voiced by Osamo Sunoe in the Japanese anime and by Charles Campbell in the English dub.^{[ep 39]}
Rod Reiss (ロッド・レイス, Roddo Reisu)
The father of Frieda, Urklyn, Dirk, Abel and Florian by his legitimate wife and the father of Historia by his lover Alma. As descendants of Karl Fritz, Rod's family have been the power behind the throne in Wall Sheena for generations, with each family head bestowed the power of the Founding Titan. When Historia was born, Rod sent her and her mother to live on a land he leased to the latter's parents.^{[ch. 52]} But when his entire family was slaughtered by Grisha Yeager when he stole the Founding Titan during the incident of Wall Maria, Rod attempts to bring Historia to live with him as he intended to use her to quickly restore the order Grisha disrupted. But the Wall Cult were unaware of his true intentions and sent Kenny Ackerman to kill Historia, with Rod convincing the soldier to let her join the Survey Corps under the alias of Krista Lenz. Reunited with his daughter, Rod reveals to Eren the truth of how his father made him a Titan before trying to convince Historia to eat Eren.^{[ch. 63]} At Historia's refusal, Rod transforms himself into a massive and crawling Abnormal Titan that is 120-meter (390 ft) tall and 40-meter (130 ft) wide while continuously burning, threatening the Orvud District.^{[ch. 67]} After being heavily crippled by the Levi Squad and Eren using a cache of barrels filled with gunpowder, Rod is killed when Historia personally makes the death blow on the nape. In his final moments, Rod transmits some of his memories into his daughter for her to better understand the situation that would soon come to Paradise with his death.^{[ch. 68]}
Rod is voiced by Yusaku Yara in the Japanese version and by Kenny Green in the English version.^{[ep 38]}
Frieda Reiss (フリーダ・レイス, Furīda Reisu)
A woman who has appeared in Eren's dream, Freida is later revealed by the firstborn daughter of Rod and the older half-sister of Historia. She was a kind-hearted person, welcomed by the people in the Reiss family's domain, and cared for Historia. She originally obtained the Founding Titan at age fifteen from her uncle Uri Reiss, gaining the power to assume Titan form, manipulate memories, and endowed with the collective knowledge of human history. Frieda also taught Historia to read and to be a kind person, but Frieda erased herself from her half sister's memory. As Frieda was inexperienced in controlling Titans, she was killed and eaten by Grisha Yeager during the fall of Wall Maria when she and her family took refuge in a church. Rod covered up her death to make it appear to be the work of bandits. As a previous Founding Titan, Freida's memories were passed on to Grisha and then Eren who eventually learned her identity.^{[ch. 62]} Frieda is voiced by Yōko Hikasa in the Japanese version and by Dawn M. Bennett in the English version.

=== Royal Government ===
The Royal Government (王政府, Ōseifu) is the ruling system of the Walls that work for the Royal Family and enforce their rules. Most of the Royal Government are loyal to Rod Reiss and his puppet ruler King Fritz. After a coup d'état that resulted in the arrest of King Fritz and those loyal to Rod Reiss as well as the death of Rod Reiss, the Royal Government was reorganized with them now working for Historia Reiss.

Aurille (アウリール, Aurīru)
Aurille is a noble who is loyal to King Fritz and Rod Reiss. When it came to Erwin Smith's trial where he is accused of not giving Eren Yeager to the Royal Government, he and the other nobles heard about the Colossal Titan and the Armored Titan having breached Wall Rose. When Dot Pyxis gives orders to establish an evacuation route, Aurille counters by ordering that Wall Sheena be closed off to prevent a civil war. When Dhalis Zachary arrives and reveals that the Titan attack is fake, Aurille claims that they stand by their king while Zachary states that a newspaper was published revealing the framing of the Scout Regiment. This led to Aurille and those involved with Rod Reiss being arrested. Aurille was tortured by Zachary where he was made to eat his own feces through a machine that he is hooked up to while also planning to parade him around in just the shoes and socks that he is currently wearing. When Historia was sworn in as the Queen of the Walls following Rod Reiss' death, Aurille was seen in a prison cell.
Aurille is voiced by Yoshikazu Nagano in the Japanese version and by Doug Jackson in the English dub.
Deltoff (デレトフ, Deretofu)
Deltoff is a noble who is loyal to King Fritz and Rodd Reiss. At one of the noblemen's meetings, Deltoff gets word from Rod Reiss stating that he had Eren Yeager and Historia Reiss captured. He was present at Erwin Smith's trial. When Dot Pyxis and Dhalis Zachary begin their coup d'état, Deltoff and those involved are arrested. When Historia was sworn in as the Queen of the Walls following Rod Reiss' death, Deltoff was seen in a prison cell.
Deltoff is voiced by Masaaki Ihara in the Japanese version and by Ben Bryant in the English dub.
Gerald (ゲラルド, Gerarudo)
Gerald is a noble and military officer who is loyal to King Fritz and Rod Reiss. At one of the noblemen's meetings, Gerald gets word from Rod Reiss stating that he had Eren Yeager and Historia Reiss captured. He was present at Erwin Smith's trial where he stated that Erwin failed to hand Eren Yeager to them. When Dot Pyxis and Dhalis Zachary begin their coup d'état, Gerald and those involved with Rod Reiss are arrested. When Historia was sworn in as the Queen of the Walls following Rod Reiss' death, Gerald was seen in a prison cell.
Gerald is voiced by Toshitsugu Takashina in the Japanese version and by Bill Jenkins in the English dub.
Roderich (ローデリヒ, Rōderihi)
Roderich is a noble who is loyal to King Fritz and Rod Reiss. He was first seen with Pastor Nick at a meeting with politicians following the Assault on Stohess. At one of the noblemen's meetings, Roderich gets word from Rod Reiss stating that he had Eren Yeager and Historia Reiss captured. He was present at Erwin Smith's trial where he stated that Erwin failed to hand Eren Yeager to them. When Dot Pyxis and Dhalis Zachary begin their coup d'état, Roderich and those involved with Rod Reiss are arrested. When Historia was sworn in as the Queen of the Walls following Rod Reiss' death, Roderich was seen in a prison cell.
Roderich is voiced by Takahiro Sumi in the Japanese version and by Ken Marmon in the English dub.

=== Civilians ===
Grisha Yeager (グリシャ・イェーガー, Gurisha Yēgā; alt. Grisha Jaeger)
The husband of Dina and Carla, the father of Zeke and Eren and the adoptive father of Mikasa. He is a renowned medical doctor who was well respected in the District of Shiganshina after he saved the village from a devastating plague.^{[ch. 3]} He also provides a house call medical service to the people of Shiganshina and to various towns in addition to having a network of contacts within the Corps of the Shiganshina district.^{[vol. 1]}
Though Eren and the others believed he went into hiding after the fall of Wall Maria, they later learned that Grisha was more than he appeared. Grisha's life story is later revealed from his memoir books and Eren's inherited memories — he is an ethnic Eldian from Marley's Liberio Internment Zone, having been disillusioned with his father since the cover-up of his younger sister's death by a Public Security officer named Gross and joining the Eldian Restorationists seven years later. Grisha married Dina Fritz and they had a son named Zeke, whom he attempted to use in a scheme to acquire the Founding Titan by having him participate in Marley's Warrior program. But he was instead sold out by Zeke with him, Dina and all the Restorationists sentenced to exile in Paradis as Pure Titans. Grisha is then saved by Eren Kruger, who slaughters the Marleyan guards and gives him the Attack Titan to carry out the mission to capture the Founding Titan.^{[ch. 86]}
After making his way to Wall Maria where he met Keith Shadis, Grisha settled in Shiganshina and became a local hero after curing the townspeople of the plague while starting a new family with Carla and their son Eren. While Grisha tracked down the Reiss family, he made no attempt on them until the day of Wall Maria's fall when he begged Frieda to stop the Titan invasion and save Shiganshina. When Frieda refuses, Grisha is metaphysically manipulated via a future version of Eren into devouring her for the Founding Titan and slaughtering most of her family.^{[ch. 63, 121]} While horrified from seeing future events after being devoured by his son as a Pure Titan, Grisha finds Eren at a Trost refugee camp and gives his son the key to their house's basement where he hid the "truth" before injecting him with Titan serum.^{[ch. 3, 62]}
Eren suffered amnesia after inheriting Grisha's Titan power until he touched Historia Reiss, ashamed of his father's actions while Historia later came to her own conclusion that Grisha may have had a logical reason for killing her half-sister.^{[ch. 63, 67]} After the Survey Corps' pyrrhic victory at Shiganshina and the recapture of Wall Maria, Eren, Mikasa, Levi and Hange reach Grisha's basement and find three books written by Grisha inside a hidden drawer containing a photograph of Grisha with his first family, and the truth that humanity is not only extant, but also thriving outside the Walls.^{[ch. 85, 86]} The information from Grisha's memoir is later released to the public by Historia's order. While Zeke attempted to use the Founding Titan to convince Eren that their father manipulated them, he unknowingly allowed his half-brother to manipulate Grisha who begs Zeke's forgiveness while beseeching him to stop Eren.^{[ch. 121]}
Grisha is voiced by Hiroshi Tsuchida in the anime. In the English dub, his name is spelled Grisha Jaeger and he is voiced by Chris Hury.
Carla Yeager (カルラ・イェーガー, Karura Yēgā; alt. Carla Jaeger)
The second wife of Grisha, the mother of Eren and the adoptive mother of Mikasa. Carla was originally a waitress in Shiganshina who fell in love with Grisha after he saved her and others from a plague.^{[ch. 86]} She was in opposition to Eren's decision to join the Survey Corps and tried to get Mikasa to change his mind.^{[ch. 1]} When her town is attacked, she becomes trapped under the Yeager family's home from debris of Wall Maria. Eren and Mikasa try to save her, although her lower body was already crushed and she entrusted them to Hannes to save. As they flee, Eren looks on as Carla is picked up and devoured by the Titan that was originally Dina Yeager.^{[ch. 2]}^{[ep 1]}
Carla is voiced by Yoshino Takamori in the Japanese dub of the anime. In the Funimation English version, her name is Carla Jaeger and she is voiced by Jessica Cavanagh.
Minister Nick (ニック司祭, Nikku-shisai; alt. Pastor Nick)
Nick is a religious leader who heads a church that believes that the Walls are sacred, and refuses any modifications to be done to the Walls. During the incident in Stohess where his church is trashed by Eren and the Female Titan's fight,^{[ep 24]}^{[ep 25]} it is revealed that he knew Titans reside in the walls and that they are activated by sunlight, but refuses to disclose any further information.^{[vol. 8]} After he is captured by the Survey Corps, Nick experiences firsthand the suffering of the families forced to evacuate because of the suspected breach of Wall Rose.^{[ch. 37]} While he refuses to reveal any secrets he knows of the Walls, Nick suggests that the Survey Corps talk to Historia about it since her birth family holds the knowledge they seek.^{[ch. 37]} He is transferred to the Survey Corps barracks, but is later found dead, having been tortured by the Military Police Brigade.^{[ch. 52]}
Nick is voiced by Tomohisa Asō in Japanese and by Francis Henry in its English dub.^{[ep 25]}
Dimo Reeves (ディモ・リーブス, Dimo Rībusu)
A merchant who was first seen trying to flee with his packages intact when the Titans breached Wall Rose. However, a menacing threat from Mikasa forced Reeves to move his cart from the tunnel to let the villagers escape to the safety of Wall Sheena.^{[ch. 5]} He appears later when his group tries to kidnap Eren and Krista, but is foiled by the Survey Corps. He agrees to Levi's terms to support the Survey Corps in their rebellion against the King.^{[ch. 54]} However, Dimo is killed by Captain Ackerman when he sees through their plan and realizes that he was working with them.^{[ch. 56]}
Kaya (カヤ)
Kaya is a civilian girl living in a village near Dauper, Sasha Blouse's home village. When Titans appear within Wall Rose, the village does not receive warning and is attacked. Kaya and her mother are abandoned by fellow villagers and a small Titan begins eating her mother alive. She is rescued when Sasha arrives. She is later taken in by Sasha's parents along with other orphans.
In 854, she discovers two escaped Marleyan children, Gabi Braun and Falco Grice, and kindly invites them home to eat with her family. When the Blouse family dines at the Marleyan chef Niccolo's restaurant she attempts to kill Gabi when she realizes that Gabi killed Sasha.
Kaya is voiced by Nana Hamasaki in the anime in Japanese and by Laura Woodhull in the English dub.

== Titans ==
The Titans (巨人, Kyojin) are the antagonists of the series. They are giant humanoid creatures that resemble nude male humans in form, although lacking reproductive organs.^{[ch. 4]} They can range in height from 3 to 15 meters (9.8–49.2 ft). Despite their enormous strength and toughness, their bodies are unnaturally light for their size. Their primary instinct is to eat humans, as they show no interest in attacking other animals. However, they seem to operate on sunlight and do not require food or drink to survive, and would typically later vomit up the remains of those they devoured. The Titans have hard skin and regenerative abilities, and can only be killed by inflicting a deep incision at the nape of the neck. They have high body temperatures, causing them to emit steam.^{[ch. 4]} Most Titans, known as Pure Titans (無垢の巨人, Muku no Kyojin), are slow and clumsy, show no signs of intelligence and act like mindless beasts with a compulsion to eat any human they come across. But some Pure Titans, referred to as "Abnormals" (奇行種, Kikō-shū), are fast-moving and intelligent enough to ignore nearby humans for larger populations.

The Fritz royal family, who inherited the Founding Titan power from Ymir Fritz, have the ability to create and control Pure Titans using a special serum created from the spinal fluid of Titans.^{[ch. 86]} It was later revealed that the Titans originate from a unique race of people known as Subjects of Ymir (ユミルの民, Yumiru no Tami; lit. 'Ymir's people'), who are the only humans known to be reactive to Titan serum. These people once used the Titan power to establish a glorious empire named Eldia (エルディア, Erudia), and are hence called the Eldians (エルディア人, Erudia-jin). The Eldians conquered the continent and subjugated the nation of Marley for 1,700 years, and have been addressed as the "spawn of the Devil" (悪魔の末裔, Akuma no Matsuei) by the Marleyans. The Power of the Titans is revealed to be product of Ymir Fritz coming in contact with a parasitic organism that is referred by others as the Source of all living matter (有機物の起源, Yūkibutsu no Kigen), which resides within the Founding Titan.

Ymir Fritz (ユミル・フリッツ, Yumiru Furittsu)
A mythical figure tied to the origins of the Titans who lived around 2,000 years ago, mentioned in stories to become the Founding Titan (始祖の巨人, Shiso no Kyojin) when she made a pact with a being called the "Earth Devil" (大地の悪魔, Daichi no Akuma; alt. "Devil of All Earth" or "Devil of All Land") to establish a nation for her descendants. In reality, Ymir was a slave girl of an Eldian king who acquired her Titan ability by accident and was exploited by her master Fritz to establish a kingdom and bear their daughters Maria, Rose and Sheena (namesakes of Paradis' three Walls). Ymir died 13 years later while protecting the king with her body force-fed to her daughters as Fritz uses them and their children to maintain their lineage's power. Ymir's spirit resides within the Coordinate, forced to obey the command of those among her direct descendants who inherited the Founding Titan's power. When Eren and Zeke manage to enter the Coordinate, the latter revealed to have nullified Karl Fritz's renouncement vow to personally engage his scheme of sterilizing all Subjects of Ymir, Eren manages to convince Ymir to aid him of her own free will in exterminating all life outside Paradis. When Eren's former allies start to interfere in the Rumbling and target the "Earth Devil", Ymir's ghost revives the Titan forms of the former users to attack them.
Ymir Fritz is voiced by Chiyuki Miura in the Japanese version and by Apphia Yu in the English dub.
Karl Fritz (カール・フリッツ, Kāru Furittsu)
A descendant of Ymir Fritz and the 145th king of Eldia, as well as the 1st King of the Walls of Paradis. A pacifist by nature who inherited the Founding Titan, Karl detested his ancestors for the atrocities they caused and the civil war among the other Eldian houses. This influenced him into orchestrating Eldia's downfall with the Tybur family, secretly moving the capital to the eastern island of Paradis while the Tyburs used the oppressed people of Marley to stage the Great Titan War and become the ruling government.^{[ch. 97]} Once Shiganshina was established, intending to separate his people from the rest of the world to live in peace, Karl used his power to wipe the memories of everyone that is a Subject of Ymir. But Karl learned some Eldians were immune, having the Ackermans who served his family persecuted while awarding others who were compelled with nobility. Living on through the Founding Titan power to influence his blood-related successors, Karl then established the Reiss Family to continue his bloodline with his heirs maintaining the ceasefire between Paradis and Marley with only Historia his last living heir.^{[ch. 86]} Some relatives of Karl remained in Marley and eventually dwindled with Zeke Yeager as the last of that line, concealing it from the Marleyans to maintain his freedom and later using it as a means to nullify Karl's influence.

=== Nine Titans ===
Some Eldian humans, known as Titan Shifters (巨人化能力者, Kyojin-ka Nōryoku-sha), can transform to-and-back between a consciously intelligent Titan and human form at will.^{[vol. 2]} Their transformation is triggered by an inflicted injury, but also requires a clear, dedicated goal in mind.^{[ep 19]} While in the Titan form, the human's normal body rests in the nape of the neck, connected via masses of muscular tissue.^{[vol. 2]} Ymir Fritz is generally considered the very first Titan Shifter.

The Nine Titans (九つの巨人, Kokonotsu no Kyojin) are nine Titan Shifter lineages that have been passed down through the Eldian people for nearly 2,000 years after Ymir Fritz's death, each of them having inherited a ninth of Ymir's soul and possessing a unique set of Titan power (巨人の力, Kyojin no Chikara). These inheritors of her Shifter power are also subjected to what is known as the "curse of Ymir" (ユミルの呪い, Yumiru no Noroi) and doomed to die after 13 years with accelerated ageing and physical decline (since Ymir died 13 years after acquiring her power and nobody can exceed hers), and their Shifter power must be passed onto someone else. The succession of the Nine Titans' power is tied to a form of cannibalism, with a successor being administered a Titan serum and transformed into a Pure Titan that acts on instinct to devour the current holder and consume the predecessor's spinal fluid, inheriting the power and cumulative memories of all previous holders. If a Titan Shifter dies without being consumed, the Titan power can be passed to a random Eldian child born at the time of the current holder's death by other interdimensional means, regardless of distance.^{[vol. 88]}

During the reign of the ancient Eldian Empire, the Nine Titans normally resided within noble families, as family relations play a significant role in passing inheriting memories from the previous inheritors of the Titan power. These houses were in a constant conflict with the Fritz family using the Founding Titan to maintain the peace. But the 145th Eldian King Karl Fritz felt great shame for his people's actions and carried sympathy for Marley, a former nation which the Eldians conquered and oppressed and collaborated the story of a Marleyan named Helos with the Tybur family to destroy their nation from the inside while rallying the Marleyans into inciting the Great Titan War. In the aftermath, Fritz took some of his subjects to Paradis and turned some into titans who formed the walls' foundation while most of the rest had their memories altered. With only the Attack Titan unaccounted for, Marley seized control of the other Nine Titans while the Tybur family were allowed to keep the War Hammer Titan for supporting Marley. By the beginning of the series, the Reiss family and the Tybur family were the only remaining bloodlines of Eldian nobility as the other Titans were distributed to Marleyian loyalists that would be utilized as the Warriors.

The powers of Nine Titans can be merged if one Titan Shifter devours another, as with the case of Grisha Yeager, an inheritor of the Attack Titan, devouring Frieda Reiss to steal the Founding Titan from the Reiss family, reducing the number of Titan Shifters to eight. Eren would repeat this when he acquires the War Hammer Titan from the younger sister of Willy Tybur, bringing the number of Titan Shifters down to seven.

Founding Titan (始祖の巨人, Shiso no Kyojin)
The 13-meter (43 ft) Founding Titan (also translated as the Progenitor Titan)"The Founding Titan, Fabled Strongest of the Nine" is the first of all Titans and fabled to be the strongest of all, though its full power was gradually divided among the other Titans following Ymir's death. By screaming (叫び, Sakebi), the holder can manipulate Subjects of Ymir in ways that include memory alteration or biological changes like transforming them into army Titans under the user's command. But the Founding Titan can only be used by someone either with the Fritz royal family bloodline, or in direct physical contact with someone of royal blood. According to Marley's Titan Biology Research Society, the Founding Titan is the point where interdimensional "paths" that connect all Subjects of Ymir and Titans intersect, and its power is coined by the Marleyans as the "Coordinate" (座標, Zahyō). The Founding Titan was previously inherited through the Fritz/Reiss family, but is currently possessed by Eren Yeager, who is not of royal blood and therefore a dormant holder of its power. But as Eren learned, the Founding Titan's power only belongs to the royal bloodline because of Ymir Fritz's persistent loyalty to her husband, so he eventually gains the full ability to use the Founding Titan's power after convincing Ymir, who has been posthumously trapped inside the alternate dimension of the Coordinate for 2,000 years, to entrust her power to him and be finally freed.
Attack Titan (進撃の巨人, Shingeki no Kyojin)
The 15-meter (49 ft) Attack Titan (also translated as the Attacking Titan) "The Attack Titan, the Blood behind Every step Forward" Is said to always move ahead seeking and fighting for freedom throughout the generations. In addition to accessing memories of previous hosts, the Attack Titan can also allow its current user to see into the future through future users' eyes, even retroactively manipulating the actions of past users by subliminal persuasion. In the aftermath of the Great Titan War, the Attack Titan was kept from falling into Marley's hands and remained hidden on the mainland. The Attack Titan was previously possessed by the Eldian sleeper agent Eren Kruger, who passed the power to Grisha Yeager, and is currently in the possession of Grisha's younger son Eren, who actually manipulated the conditions of his acquiring of it. Besides also possessing the powers of the Founding Titan which were later awakened, Eren later enhances the Attack Titan after ingesting a hardening serum and gaining the powers of the War Hammer Titan.
Colossus Titan (超大型巨人, Chō ōgata Kyojin)
The Colossus Titan (also popularly translated as the Colossal Titan)"The Colossus Titan, Sworn to melt through Solid Stone." "The Colossus Titan, the Shadow that Shakes the Ground." is infamous for its incredible size, standing at a previously unseen 60 meters (200 feet), tall enough to peer over the top of the Walls. It also possesses incredible physical strength, able to destroy the outer gate of Wall Maria with a single kick, launch entire houses in the air, and send Eren's Attack Titan flying from the ground and crashing into the top of Wall Maria. Although all Titans generate enormous amounts of heat and energy when transforming, the Colossus Titan takes this to the next level — it is capable of emitting great amounts of steam at will while exercising significant control over the amount and intensity of steam emitted by its Titan body. However, prolonged use of this ability takes a toll on the Titan, gradually decreasing its muscle mass until only the skeletal structure remains. The Colossus Titan was previously possessed by the Marleyan Warrior Bertolt Hoover, and is currently in the possession of Armin Arlert.
Since the Colossus Titan became one of the most iconic Titans and recognizable characters in the series, it has since entered into other pop culture. Prior to the start of the San Diego Padres and the Los Angeles Dodgers game held on July 5, 2019, a person dressed as the Colossus Titan mascot performed the ceremonial first pitch and later took a photo-op with Dodgers pitcher Kenta Maeda who sported the Colossus Titan baseball glove.
Armored Titan (鎧の巨人, Yoroi no Kyojin)
The 15-meter (49 ft) "The Armored Titan Burdened by armor, hardened by war." It is covered by hardened, armor plating-like skin across its body, except in key joint areas necessary for movement. Its armor is capable of protecting the Titan form from significant amounts of damage, even a direct hit from a cannon or the ultra hard steel blades of the Paradis Scout Regiment, although it can be defeated by high-power weaponries such as the Scout's Thunder Spear shaped charges and the Mid-East Allied Forces' anti-Titan artillery. The hardened skin however is heavy and can restrain movements, and the Armored Titan is only capable of maintaining moderate running speeds when completely armored unless it voluntarily sheds segments of the armor (e.g. behind the knees). The Armored Titan is currently in the possession of Reiner Braun, whose 13-year tenure is expiring with his cousin Gabi Braun an eligible candidate to inherit his power.
Female Titan (女型の巨人, Megata no Kyojin)
The 14-meter (46 ft) Female Titan (also translated as the Feminine Titan)"The Female Titan, a Fighter Without an Equal." is the only one of the Nine Titans to display a distinctly female figure, and is known for its high mobility and versatile combat abilities. Like the Armored Titan, it possesses the ability to harden its skin, though only over limited areas. This hardening ability does make its melee attacks significantly stronger, as a single well-placed blow with a hardened limb can dismember or even decapitate other Titans. Similar to the Founding Titan and Zeke Yeager's Beast Titan, the Female Titan is able to exercise some influence over Pure Titans through a scream. Its scream will attract Pure Titans to its location, but it has no control over the Pure Titans' behavior and they will attack and try to eat it. The Female Titan is currently possessed by Annie Leonhart, who had used the hardening ability to encase herself in a crystal cocoon to prevent interrogation.
Beast Titan (獣の巨人, Kemono no Kyojin)
The Beast Titan has a unique animal-like appearance that varies between holders.^{[ch. 133, 135-137]} Zeke's Beast Titan form sports a Bigfoot-like appearance with a hairless midriff. It is slightly larger than most Titans, standing at 17 meters (56 feet) tall. His Titan has a devastating ability to throw objects (such as boulders) with immense destructive capability, which makes for a deadly combination when paired with Zeke's great accuracy as a result of his baseball experience. The Beast Titan was previously held by Titan scientist Tom Ksaver whose Beast Titan form sports a goatman-like appearance. Falco Grice once claimed that there was a version of the Beast Titan with wings. It is currently in the possession of Grisha's elder son Zeke Yeager, whose status as a descendant of Karl Fritz gives him abilities the previous Beast Titans lacked. Similar to the Founding Titan, Zeke's Beast Titan can create Pure Titans with a roar if a Subject of Ymir is exposed to Zeke's spinal fluid and can command the movements of the created Titans using vocal commands. Titans under Zeke's control are even able to function at night using only moonlight. But this ability is evidently imperfect as some Titans can somewhat still ignore Zeke's Beast Titan's orders, causing Zeke to deal with it in a painful way. Prior holders of the Beast Titan had different animal-like traits like bighorn sheep (which was the Beast Titan form of Tom Ksaver), monkeys, birds, crocodiles, elks, cattle, wolves, snakes, rabbits, dinosaurs, okapis, and goats.
Jaw Titan (顎の巨人, Agito no Kyojin)
The 5-meter (16 ft) Jaw Titan is considered the swiftest of the Nine Titans thanks to its small size, and has ferocious biting strength in its jaws and incredibly powerful fingernails which can be used with devastating efficiency against both Titans and man-made structures, and can even chew through hardened Titan armor as well as the crystalized shell of the War Hammer Titan. The Jaw Titan was previously possessed by Marcel Galliard until he was devoured by Ymir when she was a Pure Titan, inheriting the power before it was passed to Marcel's brother Porco Galliard. The Jaw Titan is currently possessed by Falco Grice after devouring Porco when he sacrifices himself to save Reiner from the Pure Titan the boy was turned into.
Cart Titan (車力の巨人, Shariki no Kyojin)
The 4-meter (13 ft) Cart Titan (also translated as the Quadrupedal Titan) has an unusual quadrupedal posture, with a great speed rivalling the Jaw Titan, and a level of endurance greater than that of the other Nine Titans, allowing for it to partake in long missions without needing to rest. As a side-effect, prolonged duration of the Titan form would make the user liable to forget how to walk normally and will have to crawl instead. The Cart Titan is currently in the possession of Pieck Finger.
War Hammer Titan (戦槌の巨人, Sentsui no Kyojin)
The 15-meter (49 ft) "The War Hammer Titan, the Power Sealed from the World." War Hammer Titan can produce and manipulate structures using hardened Titan flesh and well as forming weaponized large spikes to impale a Titan, and manifest such spikes into a signature war hammer. The Titan can also be operated by the shifter using a small "flesh cable", which allows the user to externally control the Titan form. Much like the Female Titan, it also has a hardening ability which can also be used to encase the human operator in a crystal for protection. The War Hammer Titan was previously inherited through the Tybur family and was in the possession of Lara Tybur. When she was crushed and killed during the Battle of Liberio by the Attack Titan using the jaws of the defeated Jaw Titan, her blood and bodily fluid was consumed by the Attack Titan, making Eren Yeager the current holder.

=== Pure Titans ===
The following are known Pure Titans:

Sonny and Bean (ソニーとビーン, Sonī to Bīn; alt. Sawney and Beane^{[ep 15]})
A 4-meter (13 ft) Titan and a 7-meter (23 ft) tall Titan captured by Eren for Hange's studies.^{[ch. 20]} With them, Hange discovers that Titans require sunlight to operate, as Sonny becomes lethargic without sunlight, but Bean is still active.^{[ch. 20]} In the anime, Hange says they were named after Sawney Bean, the leader of a clan of cannibals who hunted and ate their victims before the authorities led by King James found their secret cave, apprehended them, and executed them.^{[ep 15]} Both are killed by Annie Leonhart.^{[ep 24]}^{[GB p.130-131]}
In the English dub, they are referred to as Sawney and Beane and are voiced by Jonathan C. Osborne and Cris George respectively.^{[ep 15]}

==== Wall Titans ====
There are thousands of these 50-meter (160 ft) Pure Titans called Wall Titans (壁の巨人, Kabe no Kyojin) that resemble the Colossus Titan in appearance and abilities, being only slightly shorter than the Colossal Titan. They have been entombed within the three Walls of Paradis by King Fritz using their hardening abilities to deter an immediate attack from Marley. Except for the Founding Titan's orders, these Wall Titans are absolutely unstoppable. They are faster than horses and according to Hange, they can destroy the Marleyan mainland in about four days. Exasperated with Marley's racial violence against the Subjects of Ymir, Eren unleashes the Wall Titans and commands them to destroy Marley. Two days later, the Wall Titans invade Marley and demolish its northeastern territories.

== Marley ==
Marley (マーレ, Māre) is a large empire located beyond the Walls and across the ocean from Paradis. It consists of an enormous continental mainland as well as many overseas territories. Marley was originally conquered by the Subjects of Ymir who established the Empire of Eldia using the Nine Titans, but King Karl Fritz collaborated with the Tybur family to allow the Marleyans to overthrow his own empire during the Great Titan War. With Karl's involvement in their uprising concealed, the Marleyans seized control of seven of the Titans and subjugated most of Eldia with the exception of Paradis Island. The Eldian population remaining on the home continent that did not migrate with King Karl to Paradis Island have since been forced to be subjugated by the Marleyans, who despised Eldians as subhumans and treated them cruelly as second-class citizens confined to segregated lives within the gated Liberio Internment Zone (レベリオ収容区, Reberio Shūyō-ku), where the Eldians are forced to wear armbands with a nine-pointed star as a badge of shame and forbidden to leave Liberio without permits. Any Eldian deemed disobedient to the Marleyan rule (not wearing armbands, leaving Liberio without permits, planning uprisings, or even just joining religious groups) will be punished by the Public Security Authority (治安当局, Chian Tōkyoku) via torture and murder, and even worse: exile as Pure Titans onto Paradis so they can mindlessly devour their compatriots on the island. Despite the hatred towards the Eldians, Marleyans still rely on Eldians as cheap cannon fodders to conquer other nations and expand Marley's territory. In the modern era, it has become increasingly difficult for Marley to maintain its status as a dominant world power through its use of Eldian-transformed Titans as convenient weapons of mass destruction, as other nations are all making technological progresses that can offset Marley's Titan advantage.

The Marleyan Military (マーレの軍事, Māre no Gunji) is the combined armed forces of Marley, consisting primarily of the Marley Army (マーレ陸軍, Māre Rikugun) (which includes the infamous Warrior Unit) and the Marley Navy (マーレ海軍, Māre Kaigun). Marley maintains its military dominance in the world stage by the use of five (formerly seven before the failure of the Paradis Island Operation) of the Nine Titans and a technologically moderate military force, which is not as developed as that of other powers around the world. The overall size of the Marleyan military stationed around Liberio exceeds 30,000 soldiers.

Calvi (カルヴィ, Karuvi)
The Marshal (元帥, Gensui) of the Marleyan military forces. Being Marleyan by heritage, he was proud of his country's glorious history against the Eldian Empire, but he had also shown distress towards Marley's weakening status in the modern age. He shared his subordinates' racist contempt of Eldians, although it was expressed with more subtlety. Calvi was later killed during the Attack Titan's ambush.
He is voiced by Kiyomitsu Mizuuchi in the Japanese version and by John Gremillion in the English dub.
Theo Magath (テオ・マガト, Teo Magato)
A commander (隊長, Taichō) of the Eldian Unit of the Marley army and formerly one of the chief overseers of the first Warrior candidates during their training. He later led the Eldian Warriors in the war against the Mid-East Allied Forces, playing a key role in Marley's crucial capture of Fort Slava and destruction of the Alliance fleet. Through the support of Willy Tybur and the governmental party of Marley along with the death of General Calvi and most of the Marleyan high command, Magath is next in line to become the general of the Marleyan military forces. He later led the Marleyans in an attack on Paradis Island where he rode in the Cart Titan's armor until Eren woke up the Wall Titans. He and Pieck are later approached by Hange and Levi where they were talked into a truce.
He is voiced by Jiro Saito in the Japanese anime. In the English dub, he is voiced by Neil Kaplan.

=== Warrior Unit ===
The Warrior Unit (戦士隊, Senshi-tai) is a subdivision of the Marleyan military's Eldian Unit, which consists of younger ethnic Eldian conscripted children. Most Warrior cadets are recruited and trained from childhood, expected to carry out the needs of their superiors without question or objection, and serve as expendable shock troops on the battlefield, performing the riskiest and most dangerous tasks and strategies while the other Marleyan soldiers remain out of harm's way. When the need arises, the Warrior who demonstrates the most exceptional performance on the battlefield is given the privilege of inheriting one of the six Shifter Titans (Beast, Cartman, Armored, Colossus, Female and Jaw) which Marley obtained during the Great Titan War. Due to the rarity of these individuals, efforts are taken to ensure that, if possible, these Warriors are not put into situations which could lead to the loss of one of Marley's Titans. The Titan Shifter inheritors along with their families are granted privileges of "honorary Marleyans" (名誉マーレ人) and can have basic human rights almost equal to ordinary Marleyans, though these rights can be revoked any time by the Marleyan authority.

Reiner Braun (ライナー・ブラウン, Rainā Buraun)
Reiner is a member of the Marleyan military's Warrior Unit and is the holder of the Armoured Titan (鎧の巨人, Yoroi no Kyojin).^{[vol. 10-11]} As the leader of the infiltration unit responsible for Marley's opening offensive against the Walls on the island of Paradis,^{[ch. 96]} he serves as one of the main antagonists for most of the story. Reiner is introduced as a cadet of the 104th Training Corps who graduates 2nd in his class.^{[ch. 2]} Described by instructor Keith Shadis as being strong as an ox and a natural leader, he quickly earns the trust of the Paradisian Survey Corps and infiltrated their ranks.^{[GB p.56-57]}
As a child, Reiner joined Marley's Warrior Unit so he and his Eldian mother could become honorary Marleyans and be reunited with his Marleyan father.^{[ch. 96]} Despite being rejected by his birth father, the fanatical patriotism instilled in him by his mother motivates him to move forward with his mission to capture the Founding Titan (aka: the "Coordinate") from Paradis Island.^{[ch. 95]} When the group leader, Marcel, is unexpectedly eaten during their journey, Reiner assumes command over the remaining two Warriors, Annie and Bertolt. They flood Shiganshina with rampaging 'Pure Titans' by destroying the outer gate of the District then breaking through the gate at Wall Maria.^{[ch. 96]} They then disguise themselves as refugees and join the masses of people within Wall Rose before joining the Paradisian military.^{[vol. 4]} Unable to pinpoint the Coordinate's location, Reiner orchestrates an attack on Wall Rose to root out its holder.^{[ch. 97]} Upon witnessing Eren transform into a titan during the ensuing battle of Trost, Reiner suspects him of possessing the Coordinate and tasks Annie with his capture.^{[ep 16.5A]} However, the plan ultimately ends in failure^{[ch. 30]} and Annie is taken captive.^{[ch. 33]} As Marley launches another offensive against Paradis, Reiner divulges his mission to Eren and begs him to leave Paradis with him and Bertolt to prevent further bloodshed. When Eren refuses, Reiner and Bertolt transform and attempt to extract him by force. However, they are thwarted by the rest of the Survey Corps and are forced to retreat, taking with them fellow corps member Ymir instead. Reiner and Bertolt regroup with Zeke Yeager, holder of the Beast Titan, and his forces consisting of Pure Titans. In the Battle of Shiganshina, Reiner is defeated but rescued by Zeke and his allies.^{[ch. 82]}
Later, in 854, Reiner is revealed to have become disillusioned with his cause after watching so many of his comrades die in vain for Marley's expansionism. While visiting with his family, he attempts suicide after hearing his unit will once again be sent back to Paradis to seize the Coordinate, but changes his mind in order to protect the young Warrior Candidates. When Eren attacks Liberio and its inhabitants, Reiner fights against his old "friend" while saving the lives of fellow Warriors Porco Galliard and Falco Grice.^{[ch. 104]} Afterwards, he plans an assault on Paradis with the goal of forever neutralizing Eren as a threat. However, the operation ultimately ends in disaster when Eren begins the Rumbling. While temporarily driven to despair, he finds a new sense of purpose upon being invited by his cousin, Gabi, and the remains of the Survey Corps to lend them his support in stopping Eren. In the Battle of Heaven and Earth, Reiner engages in battle with countless Titans, and with the help of the alliance, defeats Eren and eradicates the Titans from this world. As a result, he loses his Armored Titan powers and was able to return to living a long life as a human. Three years later, he heads to Paradis Island along with Armin and the Alliance as ambassadors for peace.
In a post on his blog, author Hajime Isayama stated that the Armored Titan's physique was based on that of WWE wrestler and former UFC fighter Brock Lesnar. In 2017, Isayama announced in an interview with Illustration Magazine that Reiner was now a "main protagonist" character. Reiner is voiced by Yoshimasa Hosoya in the Japanese anime. Robert McCollum provides his voice in the English version.
Zeke Yeager (ジーク・イェーガー, Jīku Yēgā; alt. Zeke Jaeger, Zeke Fritz)
The "warchief" of the Marley's Warrior Unit and the holder of the "Beast Titan". In his Titan form, Zeke is a 17-meter (56 ft) tall Bigfoot-like creature with long, thin arms which can be used to launch projectiles at long distances. Due to belonging to the royal Fritz bloodline, his spinal fluid can also be used to turn other Eldians into Titans completely under his control. Additionally, Zeke is a charismatic leader and proficient strategist who can utilize his subordinates' capabilities to deadly effect on the battlefield. He emerges as one of the series' main antagonists following his introduction in the manga's ninth volume (i.e. the beginning of the anime's second season).
Zeke is Grisha Yeager's firstborn son with Dina Fritz, and Eren's older half-brother.^{[ch. 35]} Indoctrinated since birth to become the Eldian Resistance's vanguard by infiltrating Marley's ranks, Zeke grew to resent his parents for consistently prioritizing their plans of Eldian restoration over his well-being. When he learns that the Marleyan authorities are closing in on the Eldian Restoration Movement, Zeke betrays his parents to save himself and conceal his identity as a descendant of Karl Fritz.^{[ch. 86]} After inheriting the power of the Beast Titan (獣の巨人, Kemono no Kyojin), he resolves to seize the Founding Titan and use it to "save" the Eldian people from further persecution by sterilizing them.
Upon becoming the Warrior Unit's field commander, Zeke oversees the training of Bertholt, Reiner, and Annie before they are sent to seize the Founding Titan from Paradis. Following the trio's failure, he leads another Marleyan attack on Paradis. After infiltrating Wall Rose's interior, he transforms Ragako's residents into Titans and proceeds to terrorize the surrounding population ^{[ch. 35]}^{[GB p.135]} Eventually, Zeke makes contact with Reiner and Bertholt and enlists them in an ambush on the Survey Corps as they attempt to seal the breach to Wall Maria and reclaim the city of Shiganshina.^{[ch. 70]} Once Eren seals Wall Maria's outer gate, he cuts off part of the Survey Corps south of the inner gate while entrusting Reiner and Bertholt with eliminating the rest of the contingent within Shiganshina.^{[ch. 74]} Despite all but destroying the Corps' existing roster, he is forced to retreat after Reiner and Bertholt are defeated and he is nearly killed by Levi.
During a five-year period of peace with Paradis Island, Zeke secretly defects to the Paradisians' side while convincing Marley's military leadership to resume their attack on the walls. This is revealed to be a pretext for a surprise attack on an international summit that results in the seizure of the War Hammer Titan and the Marleyan high command's destruction. Subsequently, Zeke is briefly detained by the Paradisians before he and Eren incite an insurrection plunging Paradis into chaos. Despite initially appearing successful in using Eren to access the Coordinate so he can sterilize all Subjects of Ymir, he learns to his horror that Eren in fact manipulated their father into murdering the Reiss family using the Attack Titan's power and that he plans to use it next to destroy all humanity outside Paradis. Lamenting that his actions cost people's lives, Zeke allows himself to be killed by Levi.
Zeke is voiced by Takehito Koyasu and Daiki Yamashita as a child in the Japanese version of the anime and by Jason Liebrecht in the English dub.
Bertolt Hoover (ベルトルト・フーバー, Berutoruto Fūbā; alt. Bertholdt Hoover)
A reserved member of 104th Training Corps who graduated 3rd in his class and open up around Reiner, Bertolt is described as having potential to master every skill he has been taught if he had the motivation for it.^{[ch. 2, 18]}^{[vol. 5:profiles]} Bertolt is a member of the Warriors and part of Reiner's infiltration team to capture the Founding Titan. He is also the holder of the Colossus Titan (超大型巨人, Chō-ōgata Kyojin; alt. "Colossal Titan"^{[ep 4]}), becoming a skinless 60-meter (200 ft) Titan who can release hot steam to protect himself and repel his opponents.^{[ch. 44]} Bertolt Hoover used his Titan power to instigate the incident of Wall Maria for his group's infiltration and later breach Trost District a few years later to force the Founding Titan's user into the open.^{[ch. 4, 9]}^{[vol. 10-11]} The reason Bertolt joined the Warriors was so his bedridden father could be provided medical care by the Marleyans, caring a cover story that he came from same village as Reiner.^{[vol. 4]}^{[GB p.58-59]} In Volume 12, Reiner hints that Bertolt has a crush on Annie.^{[vol. 12]} Bertolt is later forced to reveal his true allegiance after Reiner finally broke and exposed them. In a later battle at Shiganshina,^{[ch. 82]} he is captured by Eren and left to be eaten by Armin, who is injected with the Titan serum in order to survive lethal burns.^{[ch. 83, 84]} After Reiner returned to Marley, he learned from his mother that Bertolt's father (only referred to as Mr. Hoover), was content with his son's patriotic devotion to Marley, and peacefully passed away during their mission.
Bertolt is voiced by Tomohisa Hashizume in the Japanese anime. In the English dub, his name is spelled Bertholdt Hoover and he is voiced by David Matranga.
Annie Leonhart (アニ・レオンハート, Ani Reonhāto)
An Eldian cadet of the Marleyan Warriors, Annie is introduced as a cadet in the 104th Training Corps, where she graduated ranking 4th in her class.^{[ch. 2]} She has short blonde hair and is a small-statured loner who is skilled in melee combat,^{[ep 4]}^{[ch. 17]} having been raised by her father to consider the world her enemy.^{[ch. 18]}^{[vol. 5:profile]} Annie is later revealed to be a member of the Warriors and part of Reiner's infiltration team to capture the Founding Titan. She is also the holder of the Female Titan (女型の巨人, Megata no Kyojin), a 14-meter (46 ft) Titan with an unprecedented feminine body structure who can harden parts of her skin and quickly heal herself.^{[ep 18]}^{[ep 20]}^{[ep 21]}^{[vol. 5, 6]}
As a cadet, she teaches Eren some of her melee skills,^{[ch. 4]} and later joins the Military Police,^{[ch. 3]} where she is seen as the quiet girl.^{[vol. 8]}^{[GB p.54-55]} Following the Battle of Trost after her group deduces Eren, Annie played a role in Marco Bott's death to conceal her group's cover while later using Marco's Gear to personally kill the captive Titans Sawney and Bean.^{[ep 19]}^{[ep 23]}^{[vol. 8]} Annie later assumes her Titan form to ambush the 57th expedition to Wall Maria while searching for Eren, using the intel Reiner secretly gave her to briefly capture him while killing off Levi's special operations squad.^{[vol. 7]} Annie is outed during the Stohess District storyline once Armin deduces that she killed Sonny and Bean. Following her defeat, Annie encases herself in crystal to prevent further probing as to her motives.^{[ep 24]}^{[vol. 8]}^{[GB p.54-55]} But Annie would be revived a few years later when Eren uses the Founding Titan's power to undo all hardened Titans on Paradis.^{[ch. 124]}
Annie is voiced by Yū Shimamura in the Japanese anime. In the English dub, she is voiced by Lauren Landa. At Magic City Comic-Con 2015, Landa said that she used a low-pitched and emotionless voice in portraying Annie.
Marcel Galliard (マルセル・ガリアード, Maruseru Gariādo)
An Eldian cadet of the Marleyan Warrior Unit, Marcel was the comrade and childhood friend of Reiner Braun, Bertolt Hoover, Annie Leonhart and Pieck. At some point in his youth, his parents sent him and his younger brother Porco into training to become Warriors, where he excelled during his training and was nominated to inherit the power of the Jaw Titan. When the time came for the Warrior candidates to receive their Titans, Marcel began to worry for his brother Porco's life, and in order to keep Porco alive, secretly lobbied to his Marleyan superiors to have Reiner Braun (who was an underperformer) given the power of the Armored Titan instead. When Marley officially began the Paradis Island Operation in the year 845, Marcel was chosen along with Reiner, Bertolt and Annie to infiltrate the Walls of Paradis and capture the Founding Titan. After landing on Paradis and traveling through the night, the four Warriors camp until sunrise. At this time, Marcel reveals to Reiner his doings and apologizes for putting his brother's life over Reiner. But as the group are attacked by the Pure Titan that Ymir became, Marcel pushes Reiner out of harm's way and ends up being devoured by Ymir who acquires the Jaw Titan from him.
Marcel is voiced by Masamichi Kitada in the Japanese anime. In the English dub, he is voiced by Nathan Sharp.
Porco Galliard (ポルコ・ガリアード, Poruko Gariādo)
An Eldian cadet of the Marleyan Warrior Unit, Porco is a holder of the Jaw Titan and the younger brother of Marcel Galliard, who previously held the Jaw Titan before being devoured by Ymir's Pure Titan.^{[ch. 93]} Galliard later acquired his power by devouring Ymir after she voluntarily surrendered herself to Marley via Reiner and Bertolt. Having bullied Reiner during their Warrior cadet days, Porco bore a bitter grudge against him for getting his elder brother killed. After sustaining numerous injuries to the point of Porco being unable to heal himself, Porco learns the truth of his brother's sacrifice and sacrifices himself to save Reiner from Falco Grice, who acquires the Jaw Titan from him.
Porco is voiced by Toshiki Masuda in the Japanese anime. In the English dub, he is voiced by Kellen Goff.
Pieck Finger (ピーク・フィンガー, Pīku Fingā)
An Eldian cadet of the Marleyan Warrior Unit, Pieck is known for her intelligence and perceptiveness, and is able to transform into the Cart Titan to transport massive amounts of cargo on her back, as she did during the battle against the Survey Corps in Shiganshina, supplying Zeke with barrels and boulders for throwing. During the battle at Fort Slava, she acted as a heavily armoured tank by protecting her face with a large, plated mask while carrying two soldiers armed with machine guns. She discovers Zeke's betrayal through recognizing Yelena, and reveals it to Marley, before infiltrating Paradis and setting up an ambush for Eren Yeager. After the Rumbling begins, she joins the alliance to stop Eren.
Pieck is voiced by Manami Numakura in the Japanese anime. In the English dub, she is voiced by Amber Lee Connors.
Gabi Braun (ガビ・ブラウン, Gabi Buraun)
An overachieving, overconfident, bold and zealous Warrior candidate (戦士候補生, Senshi Kōho-sei; also translated as "Warrior Cadet"), Gabi is Reiner Braun's younger maternal cousin, the most outstanding Warrior cadet, and a favorite candidate in line to inherit the Armored Titan from her older cousin. In her childhood, she was discriminated and heavily spit on by Marleyans, which made her become bitter and hateful towards the Paradisians, whom she blamed for the persecution of all the mainland Eldians. She has a heart of bravery and invincible fearlessness to the extent of throwing bombs directly on the rail of the Mideast Union. During the Battle of Liberio after breaking out of prison, Gabi is taken in by Kaya and the Blouse family, beginning to doubt her previous hatred towards the Eldians within the Paradis Walls. She later fully renounces her hatred and attempts to stop the Rumbling alongside the Survey Corps and other warriors.
Gabi is voiced by Ayane Sakura in the Japanese anime. In the English dub, she is voiced by Lindsay Seidel.
Falco Grice (ファルコ・グライス, Faruko Guraisu)
A timid, kind-hearted Warrior candidate and nephew of the condemned Eldian Restorationist member Grice, competing with Gabi (whom he also has a crush on) to inherit the power of the Armored Titan. Despite his lack of confidence, he earned the respect of Reiner Braun who wanted him to succeed him and spare Gabi from the curse of inheriting the Titan power. After the Marley Mid-East War ended, Falco befriends a one-legged veteran named "Kruger" (who is actually a disguised Eren), who claimed to have post-traumatic amnesia and used him to send letters out of Liberio and set up a meeting with Reiner in a basement. After the Battle of Liberio, Falco ends up in Paradis with Gabi after stowing away onto the Survey Corps evacuation airship with her. He ends up being exposed to the tainted wine Zeke has distributed around Paradis, transformed into a Pure Titan as a result and acquiring the Jaw Titan while Porco saves Reiner. He later joins the alliance to stop Eren Yeager from destroying all life outside Paradis through the Rumbling.
Falco is voiced by Natsuki Hanae in the Japanese anime. In the English dub, he is voiced by Bryson Baugus.
Colt Grice (コルト・グライス, Koruto Guraisu)
A Warrior candidate favored to be the next wielder of the Beast Titan power, and the older brother of Falco and the nephew of the condemned Eldian Restorationist member Grice.
Colt is voiced by Masaya Matsukaze in the Japanese anime. In the English dub, he is voiced by Griffin Burns.

=== Tybur Family ===
The Tybur family (タイバー家, Taibā-ke) is a house of elite and influential Eldian nobles living in Marley as honorary Marleyans, although they are actually Marley's true rulers. Even though they are Eldian, they are highly respected throughout the world for being the first Eldian family to fight against their own king during the Great Titan War. They gave Marley freedom and power as an act of atonement for their ancestors' crimes against the Marleyans. They held the power of the 15-meter (49 ft) War Hammer Titan (戦槌の巨人, Sentsui no Kyojin) for generations, but only a select few knew of the inheritor's identity.

Willy Tybur (ヴィリー・タイバー, Virī Taibā)
The patriarch of the Tybur family and the true commander-in-chief of Marley prior to his death, Willy's ancestors orchestrated the downfall of the Eldian Empire with King Karl Fritz ages ago.^{[ch. 97]} While a pacifist, Willy shares his family's disdain towards Fritz's methods in the segregation of the Eldians from Paradis island. While publicly revealing his family's true history and indifference to Marley's decline, Willy express full intentions of seizing the resources of Paradis Island.^{[ch. 95]} Claiming to have inherited the power of the War Hammer Titan that was kept in his bloodline for years, Willy shared his family's preference of using its power for the sake of maintaining peace. After publicly declaring war on Paradis, Willy was killed and eaten by Eren's Attack Titan form, who then proceeded to attack Marley's leadership in the audience, but Willy's younger sister Lara is later revealed to be the true holder of the War Hammer Titan.^{[ch. 101]} Willy is voiced by Kazuhiko Inoue in the Japanese version. In the English dub version, he is voiced by Jonah Scott.
Lara Tybur (ラーラ・タイバー, Rāra Taibā)
Lara is the true holder of the War Hammer Titan. She fought with Eren's Attack Titan with whom she is equal in power.^{[ch. 101]} When the Attack Titan found out where the crystallized form of Lara is, he heads there and is intercepted by the Jaw Titan and the Cart Titan. This gave Lara time to form a new War Hammer Titan body who uses its spikes to stab the Attack Titan,^{[ch. 102]} though she is unable to pierce the nape of the Attack Titan. When Eren states that the War Hammer Titan is out of moves, he abandons the Attack Titan body and forms a new one where he picks up Lara's crystal.^{[ch. 103]} While noting the damages to the crystal surrounding her, Lara watches the battle between the Attack Titan and the Jaw Titan. After the Attack Titan subdues the Jaw Titan and uses its jaws to break open the crystal, its destruction rips Lara to shreds as the Attack Titan eats her remains.^{[ch. 104]} Lara is voiced by Mamiko Noto in the Japanese version and by Suzie Yeung in the English dub.

=== Other inhabitants ===
Mr. Yeager (イェーガーさん, Yēgā-san)
The father of Grisha and Faye and the paternal grandfather of Zeke and Eren, he was also the guardian of Zeke after Grisha was arrested. He works as a respected doctor in the Liberio Internment Zone.
Mr. Yeager is voiced by Seirou Ogino in the Japanese version and by Randy Pearlman in the English dub.
Mrs. Yeager (グリシャの母, Gurisha no haha)
The mother of Grisha and Faye and the paternal grandmother of Zeke and Eren, she was also the guardian of Zeke after Grisha was arrested.
Mrs. Yeager is voiced by Tomo Sakurai in the Japanese version and by Cynthia Cranz in the English dub.
Faye Yeager (フェイ・イェーガー, Fei Yēgā)
The younger sister of Grisha and the paternal aunt of Zeke and Eren. She was brutally murdered at the age of 8 when the Marleyan Public Security Authority officer Gross casually had his sons' dogs maul her and dumped the mutilated remains of her body near the river. The truth of her death was what later motivated Grisha to join the Eldia Restoration movement.
Faye is voiced by Chiyuki Miura in the Japanese version and by Sarah Wiedenheft in the English dub.
Tom Ksaver (トム・クサヴァー, Tomu Kusavā; alt. Tom Xaver)
Tom Ksaver is an Eldian researcher from the Titan Biology Research Society and later a Warrior who held the power of the Beast Titan, and the childhood mentor and friend of Zeke Yeager. In his early adulthood, Tom Ksaver lived as a resident of the Liberio Internment Zone. He hid his Eldian armband when he fell in love with a Marleyan woman and the two soon got married although it was forbidden. Several years after Ksaver's wife gave birth to their son, she discovered his Eldian heritage and promptly killed both herself and their son in shame. Ksaver was overcome with grief and later become a Warrior as a form of suicide. He somehow eventually inherited one of the Nine Titans, the Beast Titan, and also became a researcher in order to study the Titan powers.
Roughly halfway through his Titan tenure, Ksaver took particular interest in the poor performing Zeke Yeager and encouraged him. When Zeke revealed that his parents were leaders of the Eldian Restorationists movement, Ksaver suggested that Zeke turn in his parents in order to prove his loyalty to Marley and save his grandparents. He later revealed to Zeke his discovery that the Founding Titan was capable of changing the very body composition of Eldians. Zeke promised Ksaver that he would inherit his Beast Titan and use it to seize the Founding Titan and free the world from the fear of the Titans. In 842, Ksaver is consumed and passes on the Beast Titan to Zeke.
Tom is voiced by Kenji Hamada in the Japanese version and by John Burgmeier in the English dub.
Gross (グロス, Gurosu)
Gross is a Marleyan Sergeant Major (曹長, Sōchō) in the Public Security Authorities who expresses delight in killing Eldians, partnered with Eren Kruger. While Kruger physically disciplines Grisha when he and his sister were found wandering outside the Liberio Internment Zone, Gross took Faye away and covered up that he sadistically fed the girl to his son's dogs after her remains were found in the river the following day.
Fifteen years later, Grisha would encounter Gross when he was among the officers overseeing the Eldian Restorationists' sentence to exile on Paradis. During the process, turning Dina and most into Pure Titans while simply kicking others like Grice off the wall to be devoured by their transformed comrades, Gross confesses that he did murder Faye both for fun and to help his sons build character. Gross was about to feed Grisha to the last of the Restorationists he had turned into Titans, only to be killed instead when Kruger pushes him off the wall.
Gross is voiced by Ikkyuu Juku in the Japanese version and by Bradley Campbell in the English dub.
Koslow (コスロ, Kosuro)
Koslow is a Marleyan soldier who took part in the Marley Mid-East War and is a close comrade of Theo Magath. When Eren Yeager attacked the Liberio Festival in his Attack Titan form, Koslow was with Magath when they witnessed the fight between the Scout Regiment and the Warrior Unit. After Magath finds Pieck tending to her injuries, Koslow informs him that Gabi and Falco have not returned from pursuing Eren.
Koslow is voiced by Tōru Nara in the Japanese version and by Mick Wingert in the English dub.
Niccolo (ニコロ, Nikoro)
Niccolo is a Marleyan conscript who served in the Marleyan Navy and was part of the first survey fleet to Paradis following the Warriors' failed mission. As a member of advanced party, Niccolo landed on Paradis ahead of the main Marleyan vessel and was immediately captured by the Survey Corps. However, Yelena reveals him to be a master chef of Marleyan cuisine and he is made to cook seafood for those working on the port. He is surprised by Sasha Blouse's impassioned reaction to his food, and eventually grows closer to Sasha to the point that Kaya believes they are dating.
Niccolo is voiced by Eiji Hanawa in the anime and by Billy Kametz in the English dub.

== Eldian Restorationists ==
The Eldian Restorationists (エルディア復権派, Erudia Fukken-ha) were a radical group of rebellious Eldians in Liberio who were deeply resentful of Marley's cruel treatments and pledged to overthrow Marley and restore Eldia as a world power. The initial Restorationist movement was organized by remnants of the Fritz royal family that stayed in Marley. A revolutionary army was formed, but the uprising was unsuccessful and crushed. All members of this original organization were hunted down by the Marleyan Public Security Authority and brutally executed for treason. The latest organization was formed by an anonymous sleeper agent hidden inside the Marleyan Public Security Authority nicknamed "the Owl" (フクロウ, Fukurou), who supplied weapons, funds and historical documents to the Restorationists. The members identified their allegiance with a self-inflicted cross-shaped scar on the body. By looking at illustrations written in an ancient language nobody can read, they rejected Marley's vilified version of Eldian history and believed it to be lying propagandas, and concluded that Ymir Fritz was a goddess who used the power of the Titans to cultivate lands, build roads, bridging mountains and bring prosperity to mankind.

Grisha Yeager joined the Restorationists in year 824 at the age of 18 after being informed of the truth of his sister's murder. He quickly rose in rank within the organization, and later married Dina Fritz, the last surviving royal descendant in Marley. When the Marley government proclaimed the Warrior program, Grisha planned to make his son Zeke enlist as a Warrior cadet and serve as a sleeper agent so the Restorationists can acquire the Founding Titan from Paradis. However, Zeke snitched on his parents to the Marleyan authorities, and all the Restorationists members were arrested, tortured and exiled to Paradis as Pure Titans.

Eren Kruger (エレン・クルーガー, Eren Kurūgā)
An Eldian spy posing as a Marleyan Public Security officer. Eren Kruger's father had joined an Eldian revolutionary army led by the remnants of the royal Fritz family who remained on the mainland. Unfortunately the army was very ineffective and was defeated, and its members were captured. Kruger's parents were burned alive by the Marleyan Public Security Authorities as the young Kruger hid in a closet and watched in horror until he was rescued by his father's friends. Some years later, Kruger was able to join the Public Security Authorities thanks to faked blood tests by an Eldian doctor who had faked his own tests sometime earlier. As a spy in the military, Kruger would refer to himself in correspondence with the newly reorganized Eldian Restorationists as "the Owl" (フクロウ, Fukurō), all while spending his military career torturing and turning thousands of Eldians into Titans over the years in order to hide his identity.
Kruger first met Grisha Yeager when the latter was a teenager venturing outside Liberio without exit permits to watch an airship landing with his sister. Despite knowing that Grisha's sister was killed by the police, Kruger pretended to not know anything to protect his cover. Since then he developed sympathy for him, having arranged his meeting with Dina while concealing her lineage from the Marleyan government.^{[ch. 87]} When Grisha was sentenced to roam the lands of Paradis as an exiled mindless Titan, Kruger rescues him at the last second by kicking Sergeant Major Gross off the wall, revealing not only his disguise, but the fact that he also possesses one of the Nine Titans, the Attack Titan (進撃の巨人, Shingeki no Kyojin). Kruger explains his life is nearing its end and names Grisha his successor, then injects Grisha with Titan serum and allows himself to be eaten. Just before Kruger injects Grisha, he tells Grisha to save Armin and Mikasa from the future, although unsure of whose memories he was viewing. Grisha would pass that same power years later to his son Eren, who is apparently named after Kruger and later uses it as an alias to infiltrate Marley under disguise.
Eren Kruger is voiced by Yasunori Matsumoto in the Japanese version and by Ray Chase in the English dub.
Dina Yeager (ダイナ・イェーガー, Daina Yēgā; née Dina Fritz)
The first wife of Grisha and the mother of Zeke, and the last surviving member of the continental royal family after the failed uprising. Hiding her royal background, Dina joined the Eldian Restorationists at the behest of Eren Kruger, resulting in her meeting and later marrying Grisha.^{[ch. 87]} When the Marleyan government began establishing the Warrior program, Dina and Grisha sent their 7-year-old son Zeke as a recruit as he can be sent to Paradis and obtain the Founding Titan for their cause. But Zeke, after learning the Public Security Authority are already onto their parents, chooses to turn in his parents and their co-conspirators to save his grandparents. Kruger, working as a sleeper agent within the Public Security, made sure Dina's lineage did not get revealed while being tortured and exiled to Paradis, to keep her from being exploited by Marley as a broodmare. On the seawall of Paradis, a battered Dina farewelled her husband with the promise that she will always find him, before being injected with Titan serum and kicked off the wall, transforming into a large Pure Titan with a menacing grin.^{[ch. 86]}
Thirteen years later during the fall of Wall Maria, Dina invaded Shiganshina with the other Titans, headed straight to Grisha's house and instinctively devoured his second wife Carla, becoming the cause of young Eren's intense hatred towards all Titans. She appeared again five years later during the chaotic battle between the Survey Corps and the Armored Titan, devouring Garrison veteran Hannes, who was protecting Eren and an injured Mikasa while attempting to avenge Carla. When Eren couldn't transform and all hope seemed lost, he desperately threw a punch and hit Dina's hand as she reached to grab him. This unintentional physical contact triggered the dormant Coordinate power within Eren, and caused the surrounding Pure Titans to attack Dina and tear her into pieces.^{[ch. 50]} It was only later that Eren learns from Grisha's memoir books of Dina's existence as a human, realizing that being in direct contact with a Fritz descendant was what enabled him to use the Founding Titan.^{[ch. 87]}
Dina is voiced by Nozomi Kishimoto in the Japanese version and by Erika Harlacher in the English dub.
Grice (グライス, Guraisu)
A member of the Eldian Restorationists who played a role in Grisha's induction into the group after informing him of the nature of Faye's fate. He is also the uncle of the Warrior candidates Colt and Falco. When the Restorationists were apprehended by Zeke, Grice expresses regret meeting Grisha as he was kicked into Paradis and presumed to have been killed by his transformed comrades.
Grice is voiced by Tatsuhisa Suzuki in the Japanese version and by Robbie Daymond in the English dub.

== Anti-Marleyan Volunteers ==
The Anti-Marleyan Volunteers (反マーレ義勇兵, Han Māre Giyū-hei) are a group of underground rebel soldiers serving within the Marleyan Army, membership largely composing of people from countries that Marley conquered in its aggressive territorial expansion. Holding a severe grudge after being conscripted to fight for the country that oppressed them, the Volunteers aspired to overthrow the Marleyan government for their freedom. They initially had little success before their morale was renewed when they allied themselves with Zeke Yeager. During the early stages of the Marley Mid-East War, the Volunteers betray Marley's first survey fleet sent to Paradis Island to set up Zeke's covert alliance with the Eldians in providing the country with technology and intel in return to receive amnesty for Zeke and his followers. The Volunteers would continue aiding the Survey Corps, playing a crucial role in the Battle of Liberio, including infiltrating the Marleyan ranks to incapacitate Marleyan Warriors and piloting an airship to ensure the Survey Corps' safe retreat. After returning to Paradis, the Volunteers turn over to the Garrison Corps a case of Titan serum they managed to steal from Marley, but Dot Pixis has them arrested as he explained that Paradis is not yet to fully trust Zeke and his followers.

Yelena (イェレナ, Yerena)
A very tall blonde woman who is a fanatic follower of Zeke Yeager, serving as his lieutenant and de facto deputy leader of the Volunteers. The character is inspired by the greek fashion model Viki Kaya She is a native Marleyan who pretended to be from another country to enable her own to get close to Zeke whom she supported in his quest to sterilize the population of Paradis. Yelena has been shown to be somewhat deranged in her zealotry, and would summarily execute any of her comrades suspected to be against their goals. In 851, learning that Zeke's half-brother Eren Yeager possesses two Titan abilities, Yelena volunteers to go to Paradis Island as part of a Marleyan survey crew. Killing her commander when he refuses to surrender after their vessel is beached and captured by Eren's Attack Titan form, Yelena explains her faction to Hange and Levi while revealing that Marley's war in the Middle East is preventing it from launching another assault on Paradis Island. Forming an alliance with Paradis, Yelena and her comrades begin sharing their technology with the islanders while later arranging a meeting between Paradis and Hizuru to discuss a strategic alliance. Three years later, posing as a male Marleyan soldier from the Lakura military base, Yelena is among the Paradis forces sent to Liberio to retrieve Eren while luring Pieck and Galliard into a trap to remove them from intervening in the Survey Corps' attack. After the Battle of Liberio, Yelena and her fellow Volunteers turn over a stock of Titan serums they managed to steal from Marley to the Garrison, but are arrested by Dot Pixis, who is not yet willing to trust Zeke and his followers. In confinement, Yelena is interrogated by Pixis, who acknowledges that Eldia is in the Volunteers' debt and reveals his suspicions that Yelena has been secretly conspiring with Eren through Floch Forster.
Yelena is voiced by Mitsuki Saiga in the Japanese anime and by Anairis Quiñones in the English dub.
Onyankopon (オニャンコポン)
A dark-skinned man who is seemingly friendly but has a rather serious mindset. Onyankopon is among the first Marleyan survey fleet sent in 851 to Paradis, and helps Yelena in disarming their commanding officers when their ship is captured and beached by Eren Yeager's Attack Titan form. Forming an alliance with Paradis, the Volunteers begin to share technology with the islanders, with Onyankopon focusing on ways to strategically prepare Paradis Island for reintegration with the outside world, such as building ports. During the Survey Corps' attack on Liberio in 854, Onyankopon pilots an airship to pick up the retreating soldiers. After being arrested by Dot Pixis on account of his distrust, Onyankopon makes no effort to conceal his dismay at the Paradis military for imprisoning the Volunteers, reminding the visiting Hange of all that the two accomplished while working together over the past three years. He later accompanies Hange to a hearing regarding the Yeagerists' mutiny.
Onyankopon is voiced by Kouji Hiwatari in the Japanese anime and by Zeno Robinson in the English dub.

== Others ==
Kiyomi Azumabito (キヨミ・アズマビト)
An ambassador from the Oriental (東洋, Tōyō; lit. East Sea) nation of Hizuru (ヒィズル, Hyizuru) and the matriarch of the Azumabito family (アズマビト家, Azumabito-ke), a descendant of the former ruling Shogun clan (将軍家, Shōgun-ke). She first appeared as a diplomat attending the party the night before Willy Tybur's stage presentation in Liberio, and appears to be friendly to ethnic Eldians when she covers for Udo, one of the Warrior cadets, when he accidentally spills wine on her kimono. The following day, she visits Willy in the backstage area and passes off her visit as simply wanting to see his face and tells him that she hopes he fulfills his duty without incident. However, she leaves with her escort soon after, instead of staying to watch the stage production (which is later attacked by Eren and the Survey Corps).
It is later revealed that years ago Kiyomi secretly met with Zeke Yeager, who offered to conspire with her to restore Eldia which would benefit Hizuru as it struggled diplomatically after the Great Titan War due to the nation's historical alliance with Eldia. Kiyomi later visited Paradis with a diplomatic delegation from Hizuru to rekindle the alliance, revealing Mikasa Ackerman's mother to be a descendant of an Azumabito cadet branch that migrated to Paradis. Kiyomi explains her arrangement with Zeke to the Paradis military, offering to help modernize Paradis in return for Historia to inherit Zeke's Titan powers.
Kiyomi is voiced by Kiri Yoshizawa in the Japanese anime and by Michelle Rojas in the English dub.

== Works cited ==
=== Attack on Titan manga ===
Attack on Titan manga volumes by Hajime Isayama. Original Japanese version published by Kodansha. English version by Kodansha USA.

- Vol. 1 (ch. 1–4): 諫山創 (March 2010). 進撃の巨人 1 (in Japanese). 講談社. ISBN 978-4-06-384276-0. and Isayama, Hajime (June 2012). Attack on Titan Vol. 1. National Geographic Books. ISBN 978-1-61262-024-4.
- Vol. 2 (ch. 5–9): 諫山創 (July 2010). Attack on Titan, Volume 2 進撃の巨人 2 (in Japanese). 講談社. ISBN 978-4-06-384338-5. and Isayama, Hajime (September 2012). Attack on Titan Vol. 2. National Geographic Books. ISBN 978-1-61262-025-1.
- Vol. 3 (ch. 10–13): 諫山創 (December 2010). 進撃の巨人 3 (in Japanese). 講談社. ISBN 978-4-06-384410-8. and Isayama, Hajime (December 2012). Attack on Titan Vol. 3. National Geographic Books. ISBN 978-1-61262-026-8.
- Vol. 4 (ch. 14–18): 諫山創 (April 2011). 進撃の巨人 4 (in Japanese). 講談社. ISBN 978-4-06-384469-6. and Isayama, Hajime (March 2013). Attack on Titan Vol. 4. National Geographic Books. ISBN 978-1-61262-253-8.
- Vol. 5 (ch. 19–22): 諫山創 (August 2011). 進撃の巨人 5 (in Japanese). 講談社. ISBN 978-4-06-384513-6. and Isayama, Hajime (March 2013). Attack on Titan Vol. 5. Kodansha Comics. ISBN 978-1-61262-254-5.
- Vol. 6 (ch. 23–26): Isayama, Hajime (December 2011). Attack on Titan 6 進撃の巨人 6 (in Japanese). Kodansha, Limited. ISBN 978-4-06-384591-4. and Isayama, Hajime (August 2013). Attack on Titan Vol. 6. National Geographic Books. ISBN 978-1-61262-255-2.
- Vol. 7 (ch. 27–30): 諫山創 (April 2012). 進撃の巨人 7 (in Japanese). ISBN 978-4-06-384652-2. and Isayama, Hajime (August 2013). Attack on Titan Vol. 7. ISBN 978-1-61262-256-9.
- Vol. 8 (ch. 31–34): 進撃の巨人 8 (in Japanese). August 2012. ISBN 978-4-06-384712-3. and Isayama, Hajime (October 2013). Attack on Titan Vol. 8. ISBN 978-1-61262-547-8.
- Vol. 9 (ch. 35–38): 諫山創 (December 2012). 進撃の巨人 9 (in Japanese). ISBN 978-4-06-384776-5. and Isayama, Hajime (November 2013). Attack on Titan Vol. 9. ISBN 978-1-61262-548-5.
- Vol. 10 (ch. 39–42): 諫山創 (April 2013). 進撃の巨人 10 (in Japanese). 講談社. ISBN 978-4-06-384839-7. and Isayama, Hajime (December 2013). Attack on Titan Vol. 10. National Geographic Books. ISBN 978-1-61262-676-5.
- Vol. 11 (ch. 43–46): 諫山創 (August 2013). 進撃の巨人 11 (in Japanese). 講談社. ISBN 978-4-06-394901-8. and Isayama, Hajime (January 2014). Attack on Titan Vol. 11. National Geographic Books. ISBN 978-1-61262-677-2.
- Vol. 12 (ch. 47–50): 諌山創 (December 2013). 進撃の巨人 12 (in Japanese). 講談社. ISBN 978-4-06-394976-6. and Isayama, Hajime (April 2014). Attack on Titan Vol. 12. National Geographic Books. ISBN 978-1-61262-678-9.
- Vol. 13 (ch. 51–54): 諫山創 (April 2014). 進撃の巨人 13 (in Japanese). ISBN 978-4-06-395044-1. and Isayama, Hajime (August 2014). Attack on Titan Vol. 13. National Geographic Books. ISBN 978-1-61262-679-6.
- Vol. 14 (ch. 55–58): 諫山創 (August 2014). 進撃の巨人 14 (in Japanese). ISBN 978-4-06-395141-7. and Isayama, Hajime (November 2014). Attack on Titan Vol. 14. ISBN 978-1-61262-680-2.
- Vol. 15 (ch. 59–62): 諫山創 (December 2014). 進撃の巨人 15 (in Japanese). ISBN 978-4-06-395253-7. and Isayama, Hajime (March 2015). Attack on Titan Vol. 15. ISBN 978-1-61262-979-7.
- Vol. 16 (ch. 63–66): 諫山創 (April 2015). 進撃の巨人 16 (in Japanese). ISBN 978-4-06-395358-9. and Isayama, Hajime (August 2015). Attack on Titan Vol. 16. National Geographic Books. ISBN 978-1-61262-980-3.
- Vol. 17 (ch. 67–70): 諫山創 (August 2015). 進撃の巨人 17 (in Japanese). ISBN 978-4-06-395446-3. and Isayama, Hajime (December 2015). Attack on Titan Vol. 17. Kodansha Comics. ISBN 978-1-63236-112-7.
- Vol. 18 (ch. 71–74): 諫. 山. 創. (December 2015). 進撃の巨人 18 (in Japanese). ISBN 978-4-06-395549-1. and Isayama, Hajime (April 2016). Attack on Titan Vol. 18. National Geographic Books. ISBN 978-1-63236-211-7.
- Vol. 19 (ch. 75–78): 諫山創 (April 2016). 進撃の巨人 19 (in Japanese). ISBN 978-4-06-395636-8. and Isayama, Hajime (August 2016). Attack on Titan Vol. 19. National Geographic Books. ISBN 978-1-63236-259-9.
- Vol. 20 (ch. 79–82): 諫山創 (August 2016). 進撃の巨人 20 (in Japanese). Kodansha. ISBN 978-4-06-395720-4. and Isayama, Hajime (December 2016). Attack on Titan Vol. 20. National Geographic Books. ISBN 978-1-63236-309-1.
- Vol. 21 (ch. 83–86): 諫山創 (December 2016). 進撃の巨人 21 (in Japanese). Kodansha. ISBN 978-4-06-395815-7. and Isayama, Hajime (April 2017). Attack on Titan Vol. 21. National Geographic Books. ISBN 978-1-63236-327-5.
- Vol. 22 (ch. 87–90): Isayama, Hajime (April 2017). 進撃の巨人 22 (in Japanese). Kodansha. ISBN 978-4-06-395909-3. and Isayama, Hajime (August 2017). Attack on Titan Vol. 22. National Geographic Books. ISBN 978-1-63236-425-8.
- Vol. 24 (ch. 95–98): 諫. 山. 創. (December 2017). 進撃の巨人 24 (in Japanese). ISBN 978-4-06510-548-1. and Isayama, Hajime (April 2018). Attack on Titan Vol. 24. National Geographic Books. ISBN 978-1-63236-535-4.
- Vol. 25 (ch. 99–102): 諫山創 (April 2018). 進撃の巨人 25 (in Japanese). ISBN 978-4-06-511201-4. and Isayama, Hajime (July 2018). Attack on Titan Vol. 25. ISBN 978-1-63236-613-9.
- Vol. 26 (ch. 103–106): 諫山創 (August 2018). 進撃の巨人 26 (in Japanese). ISBN 978-4-06-512183-2. and Isayama, Hajime (December 2018). Attack on Titan Vol. 26. ISBN 978-1-63236-654-2.

=== Attack on Titan anime ===
- Episode 1: ^{1} "To You, in 2000 Years -The Fall of Shiganshina, Part 1-". Attack on Titan. May 3, 2014. Adult Swim.
- Episode 2: "That Day -The Fall of Shiganshina, Part 2-". Attack on Titan. May 10, 2014. Adult Swim.
- Episode 3: "A Dim Light Amid Despair -Humanity's Comeback, Part 1-". Attack on Titan. May 17, 2014. Adult Swim.
- Episode 4: ^{1} "The Night of the Closing Ceremony -Humanity's Comeback, Part 2-". Attack on Titan. May 24, 2014. Adult Swim.
- Episode 5: "First Battle -The Struggle for Trost, Part 1-". Attack on Titan. May 31, 2014. Adult Swim.
- Episode 6: ^{1} "The World Seen By A Young Girl – Attack on Trost: Part 2". Attack on Titan. 2013. Adult Swim.
- Episode 7: "The Tiniest of Blades – Attack on Trost: Part 3". Attack on Titan. June 7, 2014. Adult Swim.
- Episode 8: "I Hear His Heartbeat – Attack on Trost: Part 4". Attack on Titan. June 14, 2014. Adult Swim.
- Episode 9: "Whereabouts of His Left Arm: The Struggle for Trost, Part 5". Attack on Titan. June 28, 2014. Adult Swim.
- Episode 14: "Can't Look Into His Eyes Yet: Eve of the Counterattack, Part 1". Attack on Titan. August 9, 2014. Adult Swim.
- Episode 15: "Special Operations Squad: Eve of the Counterattack, Part 2". Attack on Titan. August 16, 2014. Adult Swim.
- Episode 19: "Bite: 57th Expedition Beyond the Walls, Part 3". Attack on Titan. September 20, 2014. Adult Swim.
- Episode 20: "Erwin Smith: 57th Expedition Beyond the Walls, Part 4". Attack on Titan. September 27, 2014. Adult Swim.
- Episode 21: "Crushing Blow: 57th Expedition Beyond the Walls, Part 5". Attack on Titan. October 4, 2014. Adult Swim.
- Episode 23: "Smile: Raid on Stohess District, Part 1". Attack on Titan. October 11, 2014. Adult Swim.
- Episode 24: "Mercy: Raid on Stohess District, Part 2". Attack on Titan. October 18, 2014. Adult Swim.
- Episode 25: "Wall: Raid on Stohess District, Part 3". Attack on Titan. October 25, 2014. Adult Swim.

=== Other Attack on Titan media ===
- Hajime Isayama (2014). Attack on Titan Guidebook. Kodansha Comics. ISBN 978-1-61262-945-2. – English translation. Originally published in 2013 as two volumes: Shingeki no Kyojin Inside Kou and Shingeki no Kyojin Outside Kou.
- Episode 16.5A: "Wall Sina, Goodbye: Part One". Attack on Titan: Lost Girls. December 9, 2017.
