= To You 2,000... or... 20,000 Years From Now... =

2023 song by Linked Horizon

Song by Linked Horizon
- Language: German; Japanese
- Released: 5 November 2023
- Genre: Anime song
- Length: 4:44
- Label: Pony Canyon
- Songwriter: Revo
- Producer: Revo

"To You 2,000... or... 20,000 Years From Now..." (Japanese: 二千年... 若しくは... 二万年後の君へ・・・, Hepburn: Nisennen... Moshiku wa... Nimannen Go no Kimi e...) is a song by the Japanese band Linked Horizon. It serves as the ending theme for the anime television special Attack on Titan: The Final Chapters Part 2, which aired on NHK General TV on 5 November 2023.

== Background and release ==
Prior to the release of the song, the band Linked Horizon had made multiple songs for the anime series Attack on Titan since beginning in 2013, including the openings "Guren no Yumiya" for season one and "Shinzō wo Sasageyo!" for season two. Alongside the opening to the anime season titled "The Last Titan" the release of the song marked the first time in four and a half years the band created a new song. The song features vocals performed by Yui Ishikawa and Yuki Kaji, who voiced the characters Mikasa Ackerman and Eren Yeager in the anime respectively.

The song was released under a Pony Canyon label on 5 November 2023 as the ending theme for Attack on Titan: The Final Chapters (Part 2). The song first aired on NHK General TV as part of the anime's finale, and shortly afterwards was released to various streaming platforms. The following day on 6 November, the terms "Linked Horizon" and "Revo" trended on the Japanese language X (formerly Twitter), in relation with the release of the song. On 20 November, information about the production of the song was shared by Linked Horizon in a video podcast on Spotify, also marking the first original Japanese content to be released in this form by the audio streaming company.

== Accolades ==
Awards and nominations for "To You 2,000... or... 20,000 Years From Now..."
Ceremony	Year	Award	Result	Ref.
Reiwa Anisong Awards	2023	Secret Anime Song Grand Prize	Won	
Reiwa Anisong Awards	2023	Lyrics Award (Note: Revo credited as nominee.)	Nominated	
Reiwa Anisong Awards	2023	Arrangement Award	Nominated	

== Charts ==
Weekly chart performance for "To You 2,000... or... 20,000 Years From Now..."
Chart (2023)	Peak position
Japan Download Songs (Billboard)	11
