= Shinzō wo Sasageyo! =

2017 song by Linked Horizon

- The First Limited Edition cover for album Shingeki no Kiseki, in which the song was released under

Song by Linked Horizon

from the album Shingeki no Kiseki
- Language: Japanese
- Released: 17 May 2017
- Recorded: 2017
- Genre: Anime song
- Length: 5:41
- Label: Pony Canyon
- Composer: Revo
- Lyricist: Revo
- Producer: Revo

"Shinzō wo Sasageyo!" (Japanese: 心臓を捧げよ！; lit. 'Dedicate Your Heart!') (Note: Also less commonly spelled as "Shinzou wo Sasageyo!"; also known as "Opfert eure Herzen!") is the eleventh track created by the Japanese band Linked Horizon for their second album Shingeki no Kiseki. Originally released in a shortened version on 2 April 2017 to be used as the third opening for the anime Attack on Titan, the full version would be released as part of the album about one month later on 17 May 2017. The song was composed by the band's head musician Revo, who constructed the song after re-reading the anime's manga multiple times, drawing phrases directly from it in some instances, including the song's title.

While the song would not be as successful as their first anime opening "Guren no Yumiya", (Note: "Guren no Yumiya" would top the Billboard Japan Top 100 and Hot Animation Charts, receive Double Platinum certification, and win four awards.) it would still be played at a number of concerts, and would be nominated for two awards in 2017. The song would also receive Gold certification from the Recording Industry Association of Japan in October 2018, and become Linked Horizon's first song to reach 100 million streams on the audio streaming service Spotify in December 2021.

== Background and release ==
After writing the previous two openings "Guren no Yumiya" and "Jiyū no Tsubasa" for the anime Attack on Titan, the song would be the third anime theme the band Linked Horizon would create for the show in nearly four years. The song would first be announced on 6 March 2017 as the next opening to anime, followed by a statement by the band's lead performer Revo on 9 March in the Bessatsu Shōnen Magazine. It would be released in a shortened version about one month later on 2 April 2017 to coincide with the release of the second season of the anime. The full version of the song would be released on 17 May 2017 in the album "Shingeki no Kiseki", as the eleventh track in both the 11-song "Regular Edition" and 14-song "Limited First Edition" versions. In universe, the phrase "Shinzō wo Sasageyo!" was the primary salute and war cry used by the anime's protagonists throughout the show, making it a fitting title for the song.

== Contents ==
According to Revo, the song would be constructed after reading over the show's manga multiple times to learn what parts would work best in the music. Revo would later say in an interview with the Japanese music network BARKS, that as opposed to "paraphrasing" material from the anime to make the song's lyrics, he would "pull out the words from Attack on Titan with pride". Revo would further explain the song likewise contains "elements that people who already know what's going to happen will know it's a spoiler [but] for those who don't know about it, will think it's just an expression that catches their attention". The website Comic Book Resources would also comment on the song, stating it possesses an "epic feel [which] captures Attack On Titan's action-packed battles and encapsulates the series' overall tone".

== Other performances ==
The song would be performed alongside other tracks in the album "Shingeki no Kiseki" on multiple concert tours Linked Horizon would host in 2017. On 20 July 2018, the Dutch symphonic metal band Epica would release a cover version of the song in their second EP Epica vs Attack on Titan Songs, which they began recording in the summer of 2017.

== Reception ==
=== Chart performance ===
The song would have a strong debut on two Billboard Japan charts seen below, and would reach the top position on multiple music streaming service charts. In December 2021, the song would be streamed over 100 million times on the audio streaming service Spotify, becoming the first Linked Horizon song to accomplish the feat. The song would also come in 5th on Spotify's annual "Most played songs by Japanese artists overseas" chart in 2021, and remained the 10th most streamed anime opening on Spotify in 2022.

Weekly chart performance for "Shinzō wo Sasageyo!"
Chart (2017)	Peak position
Japan Hot 100 (Billboard)	16
Japan Hot Animation (Billboard)	2

Yearly chart performance for "Shinzō wo Sasageyo!"
Chart (2017)	Peak position
Japan Download Songs (Billboard)	81

=== Certifications ===
Region	Certification	Certified units/sales
Japan (RIAJ)	Gold	100,000^{*}
^{*} Sales figures based on certification alone.

=== Accolades ===
Year	Award	Category	Recipient	Result	Ref.
2017	Newtype Anime Awards	Best Theme Song	"Shinzō o Sasage yo!" Linked Horizon (Attack on Titan Season 2)	8th place	
2017	Crunchyroll Anime Awards	Best Opening	"Shinzou wo Sasageyo!"; Linked Horizon, Attack on Titan Season 2	Nominated	
