= Dances with the Dragons =

Japanese light novel series

- Cover art of the 20th light novel published by Shogakukan, featuring Gayus Levina Sorel (right) and Gigina Jerde Dolk Melios Ashley Boeuf (left).

されど罪人は竜と踊る Dances with the Dragons (Saredo Tsumibito wa Ryū to Odoru: Dances with the Dragons)
- Genre: Dark fantasy
- Light novel

Saredo Tsumibito wa Ryū to Odoru
- Written by: Labo Asai
- Illustrated by: Miyagi
- Published by: Kadokawa Shoten
- Imprint: Kadokawa Sneaker Bunko
- Original run: January 30, 2003 – May 1, 2006
- Volumes: 8
- Manga

Saredo Tsumibito wa Ryū to Odoru
- Written by: Labo Asai
- Illustrated by: Yaku Haibara
- Published by: Kadokawa Shoten
- Imprint: Kadokawa Comics Ace
- Magazine: Beans Ace
- Published: June 26, 2006
- Volumes: 1
- Light novel
- Written by: Labo Asai
- Illustrated by: Miyagi (Vol.1–13); Zain (Vol.14–present)
- Published by: Shogakukan
- Imprint: Gagaga Bunko
- Original run: May 20, 2008 – present
- Volumes: 24
- Manga

Saredo Tsumibito wa Ryū to Odoru: Rinbu
- Written by: Miyagi
- Published by: Shogakukan
- Imprint: Sunday GX Comics
- Magazine: Sunday Webry
- Original run: April 29, 2017 – September 8, 2018
- Volumes: 4
- Anime television series
- Directed by: Hiroshi Nishikori (Note: Credited as Chief Director (総監督, Sō Kantoku).); Hirokazu Hanai
- Produced by: Junichirō Tanaka; Ryō Yasumura; Reo Kurosu; Toshiyasu Hayashi; Atsushi Chiku; Shunsuke Hasegawa
- Written by: Takayo Ikami
- Music by: Takashi Ōmama
- Studio: Seven Arcs Pictures
- Licensed by: Crunchyroll
- Original network: TBS, BS-TBS
- English network: SEA: Animax Asia
- Original run: April 5, 2018 – June 21, 2018
- Episodes: 12

Dances with the Dragons (されど罪人は竜と踊る Dances with the Dragons, Saredo Tsumibito wa Ryū to Odoru: Dances with the Dragons; lit. "Yet the Criminal Dances with the Dragons") is a Japanese light novel series, written by Labo Asai and illustrated by Miyagi, who was later replaced by Zain. It was originally published as just Saredo Tsumibito wa Ryū to Odoru (されど罪人は竜と踊る) by Kadokawa Shoten, who released eight volumes between 2003 and 2006 under their Kadokawa Sneaker Bunko imprint. It switched publishers in 2008 to Shogakukan, who have published twenty-four volumes as of February 2023. A manga adaptation of the original series with art by Yaku Haibara was serialized in Kadokawa's Beans Ace magazine. It was collected in a single tankōbon volume. An anime television series adaptation animated by Seven Arcs Pictures aired from April 5 to June 21, 2018.

== Synopsis ==
A long time ago, dragons were the only creatures capable of wielding magic, which they used to terrorize humanity, until humanity learned to channel magic through special formulas and spells called "jushiiki". Those capable of using jushiiki became known as jushikiists, and became crucial in fighting dragons throughout the years, until a peace treaty was enforced to prevent both races from wiping each other out. In the modern day, Gayus and Gigina are two jushikiists who take special jobs from a variety of clients in the city of Eridana.

== Characters ==
Gayus Levina Sorel (ガユス・レヴィナ・ソレル, Gayusu Revina Soreru)
Voiced by: Nobunaga Shimazaki (Japanese); Garret Storms (English)
A deductive and intellectual jushiikist who constantly worries about his financial state and his relationship with his girlfriend Jivunya. He lost his sister Aleciel when he was younger, which motivated his jushiikist training.
Gigina Jerde Dolk Melios Ashley Boeuf (ギギナ・ジャーディ・ドルク・メレイオス・アシュレイ・ブフ, Gigina Jādi Doruku Mereiosu Ashurei Bufu)
Voiced by: Yoshimasa Hosoya (Japanese); Josh Bangle (English)
Gayus' partner and a jushiikist hailing from the Drake culture, which emphasizes glory and honor in battle. Gigina enjoys fighting and spending money in frivolous things, such as excessive furniture, which frustrates Gayus to no end.
Jivunya Lorezzo (ジヴーニャ・ロレッツォ, Jivūnya Rorettso)
Voiced by: Yōko Hikasa (Japanese); Megan Shipman (English)
Gayus' girlfriend. An Arlian born amongst humans, she has blonde hair, and fair skin. She constantly worries for Gayus, especially whenever he gets injured.
Nidvolk (ニドヴォルク, Nidovoruku)
Voiced by: Yūko Kaida (Japanese); Janelle Lutz (English)
The mate of Eningiluud, the black dragon Gayus and Gigina kill on a mission. Seeking revenge on her mate's killers, she assumes a human form and kills several jushikiists across Eridana and eventually confronts Gayus and Gigina, who barely manage to kill her.
Mordin Orjes Gyunei (モルディーン・オージェス・ギュネイ, Morudīn Ōjesu Gyunei)
Voiced by: Takaya Hashi (Japanese); Garrett Schenck (English)
A high-ranking politician dedicated to maintaining peace between humans and dragons, which leads him to use pragmatic and ruthless methods to uphold said peace.
Yorkan (ヨーカーン, Yōkān)
Voiced by: Mutsumi Tamura
An androgynous jushiikist working as one of Mordin's generals.
Curaso Opt Koga (キュラソー・オプト・コウガ, Kyurasō Oputo Kouga)
Voiced by: Yoshino Nanjō (Japanese); Natalie Hoover (English)
Jesper Livy Raki (イェスパー・リヴェ・ラキ, Yesupā Rive Raki)
Voiced by: Takanori Hoshino
One of Mordin's generals and Berdrit's older brother.
Berdrit Livy Raki (ベルドリト・リヴェ・ラキ, Berudorito Rive Raki)
Voiced by: Sora Tokui
One of Mordin's generals and Jesper's younger brother.
Genon Cull Darius (ジェノン・カル・ダリウス, Jenon Karu Dariusu)
Voiced by: Gou Inoue
Herodel (ヘロデル, Heroderu)
Voiced by: Atsushi Imaruoka
Arzel (アーゼル, Āzeru)
Voiced by: Aya Suzaki (Japanese); Madeleine Morris (English)
A journalist and acquaintance of Gayus.
Maslow Gossum (マズローゴッサム, Mazurō Gossamu)
Voiced by: Hirofumi Nojima (Japanese); Orion Pitts (English)
Largonquin Bathcark (ラルゴンキン・バスカーク, Rarugonkin Basukāku)
Voiced by: Rintarō Nishi
Javeira Gofe Zutcliff (ジャベイラ・ゴーフ・ザトクリフ, Jabeira Gōfu Zatokurifu)
Voiced by: Rica Matsumoto
Īgī Dorie (イーギー・ドリイエ, Īgī Doriie)
Voiced by: Hiro Shimono
Yākutō Pedimete (ヤークトー・ペジメテ, Yākutō Pejimete)
Voiced by: Motomu Kiyokawa
Remedius (レメディウス, Remediusu)
Voiced by: Tomokazu Sugita
Zuo rū (ズオ・ルー, Zuo rū)
Voiced by: Akira Ishida
Amupura (アムプーラ, Amupura)
Voiced by: Norio Wakamoto

== Media ==
=== Anime ===
An anime television series adaptation animated by Seven Arcs Pictures was originally scheduled to air starting on October 5, 2017, on TBS. However, due to production issues, the anime's premiere was delayed until April 5, 2018, on TBS, and later on April 14, 2018, on BS-TBS. Hiroshi Nishikori serves as chief director of the series, Hirokazu Hanai directing the series, with Takayo Ikami in charge of series composition and Masaru Kitao designed the characters. fripSide performed the opening theme song "divine criminal", and Maon Kurosaki performed the ending theme song "décadence" (-デカダンス-). The series ran for 12 episodes. Crunchyroll streamed the series with subtitles.

No.	English title (Note: All English titles are taken from Crunchyroll.) Original Japanese title	Original release date
1	"Calamitous Song of Jushiki and Swords"; Transliteration: "Jushiki to ken no ka uta" (Japanese: 咒式と剣の禍唄)	April 5, 2018
2	"The Cardinal's Celebration"; Transliteration: "Sūki-kyō-chō no shukusai" (Japanese: 枢機卿長の祝祭)	April 12, 2018
3	"Weaver of Light"; Transliteration: "Hikari no Tsumugi te" (Japanese: 光の紡ぎ手)	April 19, 2018
4	"Ballet of the Winged"; Transliteration: "Tsubasa motsu monotachi no gunbu" (Japanese: 翼持つものたちの群舞)	April 26, 2018
5	"Goddess of Revenge"; Transliteration: "Fukushū no Megami" (Japanese: 復讐の女神)	May 3, 2018
6	"Bad Omen"; Transliteration: "Kyōchō" (Japanese: 凶兆)	May 10, 2018
7	"Invitation to an Evening Party"; Transliteration: "Yakai e no Sasoi" (Japanese: 夜会への誘い)	May 17, 2018
8	"Calm Days and Lonely Nights"; Transliteration: "Odayaka na hiru to sabishī yoru" (Japanese: おだやかな昼と寂しい夜)	May 24, 2018
9	"Revelation of Malice"; Transliteration: "Akui no Keiji" (Japanese: 悪意の啓示)	May 31, 2018
10	"Guillotine of Spiders • Time of Snakes"; Transliteration: "Kumo no dantō dai ・ Hebi no Kokugen" (Japanese: 蜘蛛の断頭台・蛇の刻限)	June 7, 2018
11	"Endgame of Sand"; Transliteration: "Sareki no Shūkyoku-zu" (Japanese: 砂礫の終局図)	June 14, 2018
12	"And Yet, We..."; Transliteration: "Saredo ware-ra wa" (Japanese: されど我らは)	June 21, 2018
