= List of Attack on Titan episodes =

Episodes' List of Japanese manga series Attack on Titan

Attack on Titan is a Japanese dark fantasy anime television series based on Hajime Isayama's Attack on Titan manga series. It is set in a world where humanity lives inside cities surrounded by enormous walls due to the Titans, gigantic humanoid beings who devour humans seemingly without reason. The story follows the adventures of Eren Yeager, and his friends Mikasa Ackerman and Armin Arlert, whose lives are changed forever after the Colossal Titan breaches the wall of their home town. Vowing revenge and to reclaim the world from the Titans, Eren and his friends join the Scout Regiment, an elite group of soldiers who fight Titans.

The fourth and final season first premiered on December 7, 2020; the second part of the season premiered on January 10, 2022, and the third and fourth parts initially aired as two television specials; the first premiered on March 4, 2023, at 12:25 a.m. JST while the second premiered on November 5, 2023, at midnight JST. After the broadcast of the second special, an individual TV episode size version of both parts are being distributed on multiple streaming services. Episodes 88–90 which compile the first special began streaming on November 5, 2023, while episodes 91–94 which compile the second special began streaming on November 12, 2023.

== Series overview ==
Season	Episodes		Originally released	
Season	Episodes		First released	Last released
1	25		April 7, 2013	September 29, 2013
2	12		April 1, 2017	June 17, 2017
3	22	12	July 23, 2018	October 15, 2018
3	22	10	April 29, 2019	July 1, 2019
4 (Note: Parts 3 and 4 originally aired as two television specials and were later redistributed as episodes 88–94 (season 4, episodes 29–35) of the TV series.)	35	16	December 7, 2020	March 29, 2021
4	35	12	January 10, 2022	April 4, 2022
4	35	Sp.	March 4, 2023	
4	35	Sp.	November 5, 2023	

== Episodes ==
=== Season 1 (2013) ===
No. overall	No. in season	Title	Directed by	Written by	Original release date	English air date
1	1	"To You, in 2000 Years: The Fall of Shiganshina, Part 1"; Transliteration: "Nisennen-go no Kimi e -Shiganshina Kanraku (1)-" (Japanese: 二千年後の君へ ―シガンシナ陥落①―)	Hiroyuki Tanaka, Tetsurō Araki	Yasuko Kobayashi	April 7, 2013	May 3, 2014
2	2	"That Day: The Fall of Shiganshina, Part 2"; Transliteration: "Sono Hi -Shiganshina Kanraku (2)-" (Japanese: その日 ―シガンシナ陥落②―)	Masashi Koizuka	Yasuko Kobayashi	April 14, 2013	May 10, 2014
3	3	"A Dim Light Amid Despair: Humanity's Comeback, Part 1"; Transliteration: "Zetsubō no Naka de Nibuku Hikaru -Jinrui no Saiki (1)-" (Japanese: 絶望の中で鈍く光る ―人類の再起①―)	Kiyoshi Fukumoto	Hiroshi Seko	April 21, 2013	May 17, 2014
4	4	"The Night of the Closing Ceremony: Humanity's Comeback, Part 2"; Transliteration: "Kaisan Shiki no Yoru -Jinrui no Saiki (2)-" (Japanese: 解散式の夜 ―人類の再起②―)	Makoto Bessho	Yasuko Kobayashi	April 28, 2013	May 24, 2014
5	5	"First Battle: The Struggle for Trost, Part 1"; Transliteration: "Uijin -Torosuto-ku Kōbōsen (1)-" (Japanese: 初陣 ―トロスト区攻防戦①―)	Shinpei Ezaki	Hiroshi Seko	May 5, 2013	May 31, 2014
6	6	"The World the Girl Saw: The Struggle for Trost, Part 2"; Transliteration: "Shōjo ga Mita Sekai -Torosuto-ku Kōbōsen (2)-" (Japanese: 少女が見た世界 ―トロスト区攻防戦②―)	Tomomi Ikeda	Hiroshi Seko	May 12, 2013	June 7, 2014
7	7	"Small Blade: The Struggle for Trost, Part 3"; Transliteration: "Chiisana Yaiba -Torosuto-ku Kōbōsen (3)-" (Japanese: 小さな刃 ―トロスト区攻防戦③―)	Yuzuru Tachikawa	Hiroshi Seko	May 19, 2013	June 14, 2014
8	8	"I Can Hear His Heartbeat: The Struggle for Trost, Part 4"; Transliteration: "Shinzō no Kodō ga Kikoeru -Torosuto-ku Kōbōsen (4)-" (Japanese: 心臓の鼓動が聞こえる ―トロスト区攻防戦④―)	Satonobu Kikuchi, Shinpei Ezaki, Tatsuma Minamikawa	Noboru Takagi	May 26, 2013	June 21, 2014
9	9	"Whereabouts of His Left Arm: The Struggle for Trost, Part 5"; Transliteration: "Hidariude no Yukue -Torosuto-ku Kōbōsen (5)-" (Japanese: 左腕の行方 ―トロスト区攻防戦⑤―)	Yoshiyuki Fujiwara	Yasuko Kobayashi	June 2, 2013	June 28, 2014
10	10	"Response: The Struggle for Trost, Part 6"; Transliteration: "Kotaeru -Torosuto-ku Kōbōsen (6)-" (Japanese: 応える ―トロスト区攻防戦⑥―)	Hiroyuki Tanaka	Hiroshi Seko	June 9, 2013	July 12, 2014
11	11	"Idol: The Struggle for Trost, Part 7"; Transliteration: "Gūzō -Torosuto-ku Kōbōsen (7)-" (Japanese: 偶像 ―トロスト区攻防戦⑦―)	Kiyoshi Fukumoto	Hiroshi Seko	June 16, 2013	July 19, 2014
12	12	"Wound: The Struggle for Trost, Part 8"; Transliteration: "Kizu -Torosuto-ku Kōbōsen (8)-" (Japanese: 傷 ―トロスト区攻防戦⑧―)	Shintaro Itoga	Noboru Takagi	June 23, 2013	July 26, 2014
13	13	"Primal Desire: The Struggle for Trost, Part 9"; Transliteration: "Genshoteki Yokkyū -Torosuto-ku Kōbōsen (9)-" (Japanese: 原初的欲求 ―トロスト区攻防戦⑨―)	Masashi Koizuka	Noboru Takagi	June 30, 2013	August 2, 2014
14	14	"Can't Look into His Eyes Yet: Eve of the Counterattack, Part 1"; Transliteration: "Mada Me o Mirenai -Hangeki Zen'ya (1)-" (Japanese: まだ目を見れない ―反撃前夜①―)	Keisuke Onishi, Shinpei Ezaki	Yasuko Kobayashi	July 14, 2013	August 9, 2014
15	15	"Special Operations Squad: Eve of the Counterattack, Part 2"; Transliteration: "Tokubetsu Sakusen-han -Hangeki Zen'ya (2)-" (Japanese: 特別作戦班 ―反撃前夜②―)	Kiyoshi Fukumoto	Hiroshi Seko	July 21, 2013	August 16, 2014
16	16	"What Needs to Be Done Now: Eve of the Counterattack, Part 3"; Transliteration: "Ima, Nani o Subeki ka -Hangeki Zen'ya (3)-" (Japanese: 今、何をすべきか ―反撃前夜③―)	Keisuke Onishi, Yasushi Muroya	Yasuko Kobayashi	July 28, 2013	August 23, 2014
17	17	"Female Titan: The 57th Exterior Scouting Mission, Part 1"; Transliteration: "Megata no Kyojin -Dai Gojū-Nana Kai Hekigai Chōsa (1)-" (Japanese: 女型の巨人 ―第57回壁外調査①―)	Daisuke Tokudo, Masashi Koizuka	Hiroshi Seko	August 4, 2013	September 6, 2014
18	18	"Forest of Giant Trees: The 57th Exterior Scouting Mission, Part 2"; Transliteration: "Kyodaiju no Mori -Dai Gojū-Nana Kai Hekigai Chōsa (2)-" (Japanese: 巨大樹の森 ―第57回壁外調査②―)	Hiroyuki Tanaka, Shin Wakabayashi	Hiroshi Seko	August 11, 2013	September 13, 2014
19	19	"Bite: The 57th Exterior Scouting Mission, Part 3"; Transliteration: "Kamitsuku -Dai Gojū-Nana Kai Hekigai Chōsa (3)-" (Japanese: 噛み付く ―第57回壁外調査③―)	Kiyoshi Fukumoto, Tomomi Ikeda	Noboru Takagi	August 18, 2013	September 20, 2014
20	20	"Erwin Smith: The 57th Exterior Scouting Mission, Part 4"; Transliteration: "Eruvin Sumisu -Dai Gojū-Nana Kai Hekigai Chōsa (4)" (Japanese: エルヴィン・スミス ―第57回壁外調査④―)	Shintaro Itoga	Yasuko Kobayashi	August 25, 2013	September 27, 2014
21	21	"Crushing Blow: The 57th Exterior Scouting Mission, Part 5"; Transliteration: "Tettsui -Dai Gojū-Nana Kai Hekigai Chōsa (5)-" (Japanese: 鉄槌 ―第57回壁外調査⑤―)	Hiroyuki Tanaka, Yasushi Muroya	Noboru Takagi	September 1, 2013	October 4, 2014
22	22	"The Defeated: The 57th Exterior Scouting Mission, Part 6"; Transliteration: "Haisha-tachi -Dai Gojū-Nana Kai Hekigai Chōsa (6)-" (Japanese: 敗者達 ―第57回壁外調査⑥―)	Makoto Bessho, Shinpei Ezaki	Noboru Takagi	September 8, 2013	October 11, 2014
23	23	"Smile: Assault on Stohess, Part 1"; Transliteration: "Hohoemi -Sutohesu-ku Kyūshū (1)-" (Japanese: 微笑み ―ストヘス区急襲①―)	Hirokazu Yamada	Hiroshi Seko	September 15, 2013	October 18, 2014
24	24	"Mercy: Assault on Stohess, Part 2"; Transliteration: "Jihi -Sutohesu-ku Kyūshū (2)-" (Japanese: 慈悲 ―ストヘス区急襲②―)	Akitoshi Yokoyama, Hiroyuki Tanaka	Yasuko Kobayashi	September 22, 2013	October 25, 2014
25	25	"Wall: Assault on Stohess, Part 3"; Transliteration: "Kabe -Sutohesu-ku Kyūshū (3)-" (Japanese: 壁 ―ストヘス区急襲③―)	Daisuke Tokudo, Masashi Koizuka, Shintarō Itoga, Tetsurō Araki	Yasuko Kobayashi	September 29, 2013	November 1, 2014

=== Season 2 (2017) ===
No. overall	No. in season	Title	Directed by	Written by	Storyboarded by	Original release date	English air date
26	1	"Beast Titan"; Transliteration: "Kemono no Kyojin" (Japanese: 獣の巨人)	Hiroyuki Tanaka	Yasuko Kobayashi	Masashi Koizuka	April 1, 2017	April 23, 2017
27	2	"I'm Home"; Transliteration: "Tadaima" (Japanese: ただいま)	Yoshihide Ibata	Yasuko Kobayashi	Masashi Koizuka	April 8, 2017	April 30, 2017
28	3	"Southwestward"; Transliteration: "Nansei e" (Japanese: 南西へ)	Kenji Imura	Hiroshi Seko	Ryōtarō Makihara	April 15, 2017	May 7, 2017
29	4	"Soldier"; Transliteration: "Heishi" (Japanese: 兵士)	Hitomi Ezoe	Hiroshi Seko	Satoshi Iwataki	April 22, 2017	May 14, 2017
30	5	"Historia"; Transliteration: "Hisutoria" (Japanese: ヒストリア)	Tetsuya Wakano	Yasuko Kobayashi	Tetsuya Wakano, Takayuki Hirao	April 29, 2017	May 21, 2017
31	6	"Warrior"; Transliteration: "Senshi" (Japanese: 戦士)	Hiroyuki Tanaka	Hiroshi Seko	Hiroyuki Tanaka	May 6, 2017	June 4, 2017
32	7	"Close Combat"; Transliteration: "Da - Tō - Kyoku" (Japanese: 打・投・極)	Takayuki Hirao	Hiroshi Seko	Takayuki Hirao	May 13, 2017	June 11, 2017
33	8	"The Hunters"; Transliteration: "Ou Mono" (Japanese: 迫う者)	Yūmi Kawai	Yasuko Kobayashi	Ryōtarō Makihara	May 20, 2017	June 18, 2017
34	9	"Opening"; Transliteration: "Kaikō" (Japanese: 開口)	Yoshihide Ibata	Yasuko Kobayashi	Yoshihide Ibata	May 27, 2017	June 25, 2017
35	10	"Children"; Transliteration: "Kodomotachi" (Japanese: 子供達)	Kenji Imura	Hiroshi Seko	Masayuki Miyaji	June 3, 2017	July 9, 2017
36	11	"Charge"; Transliteration: "Totsugeki" (Japanese: 突撃)	Hiroyuki Tanaka, Yasuhiro Akamatsu	Hiroshi Seko	Takayuki Hirao	June 10, 2017	July 16, 2017
37	12	"Scream"; Transliteration: "Sakebi" (Japanese: 叫び)	Satonobu Kikuchi, Takayuki Hirao, Tetsurō Araki, Yoshihide Ibata	Yasuko Kobayashi	Yuzo Sato, Ryōtarō Makihara	June 17, 2017	July 23, 2017

=== Season 3 (2018–2019) ===
No. overall	No. in season	Title	Directed by	Written by	Storyboarded by	Original release date	English air date
Part 1
38	1	"Smoke Signal"; Transliteration: "Noroshi" (Japanese: 狼煙)	Hiroyuki Tanaka	Yasuko Kobayashi	Masashi Koizuka	July 23, 2018	July 11, 2018 (theatres) (Note: Funimation screened the episode in North American theatres on July 11, 2018.); August 18, 2018 (television)
39	2	"Pain"; Transliteration: "Itami" (Japanese: 痛み)	Shita Taro	Yasuko Kobayashi	Takayuki Hirao	July 30, 2018	August 25, 2018
40	3	"Old Story"; Transliteration: "Mukashibanashi" (Japanese: 昔話)	Tomoko Hirakata	Hiroshi Seko	Hiroyuki Morita	August 6, 2018	September 8, 2018 (Note: Episode 40 was delayed due to Adult Swim airing a My Hero Academia marathon on September 1, 2018.)
41	4	"Trust"; Transliteration: "Shinrai" (Japanese: 信頼)	Aiko Sakuraba	Hiroshi Seko	Ryōtarō Makihara	August 13, 2018	September 15, 2018
42	5	"Reply"; Transliteration: "Kaitō" (Japanese: 回答)	Miki Komuro	Yasuko Kobayashi	Yoshiaki Kawajiri	August 20, 2018	September 22, 2018
43	6	"Sin"; Transliteration: "Tsumi" (Japanese: 罪)	Ryūta Kawahara	Hiroshi Seko	Tomohiko Itō	August 27, 2018	September 30, 2018 (Note: Starting from episode 43, Attack on Titan season 3 part 1 moved to 12:00 a.m. ET/PT, effectively airing on Sunday morning.)
44	7	"Wish"; Transliteration: "Negai" (Japanese: 願い)	Hiroyuki Tanaka, Ken Andō	Hiroshi Seko	Yuzo Sato	September 3, 2018	October 7, 2018
45	8	"Outside the Walls of Orvud District"; Transliteration: "Orubudo-ku Gaiheki" (Japanese: オルブド区外壁)	Matsuo Asami, Azuma Ryōsuke	Yasuko Kobayashi	Hiroyuki Morita	September 10, 2018	October 14, 2018
46	9	"Ruler of the Walls"; Transliteration: "Kabe no Ō" (Japanese: 壁の王)	Yasuhiro Akamatsu	Hiroshi Seko	Shinji Higuchi, Yasuhiro Akamatsu	September 17, 2018	October 21, 2018
47	10	"Friends"; Transliteration: "Yūjin" (Japanese: 友人)	Shintarō Itoga, Aiko Sakuraba	Hiroshi Seko	Masayuki Miyaji	September 24, 2018	October 28, 2018
48	11	"Bystander"; Transliteration: "Bōkansha" (Japanese: 傍観者)	Matsuo Asami, Ken Andō, Shingo Uchida	Yasuko Kobayashi	Hiroshi Hara	October 8, 2018 (Note: Due to NHK's news coverage of Typhoon Trami, episode 11 of season 3 was delayed by a week to October 8, 2018.)	November 4, 2018
49	12	"Night of the Battle to Retake the Wall"; Transliteration: "Dakkan Sakusen no Yoru" (Japanese: 奪還作戦の夜)	Takashi Andō, Yasuhiro Akamatsu	Hiroshi Seko	Norihiro Naganuma	October 15, 2018	November 11, 2018
Part 2
50	13	"The Town Where Everything Began"; Transliteration: "Hajimari no Machi" (Japanese: はじまりの街)	Hiroyuki Tanaka	Yasuko Kobayashi	Masayuki Miyaji	April 29, 2019	May 25, 2019
51	14	"Thunder Spears"; Transliteration: "Raisō" (Japanese: 雷槍)	Akitoshi Yokoyama, Yasuhiro Akamatsu	Hiroshi Seko	Akitoshi Yokoyama	May 6, 2019	June 1, 2019
52	15	"Descent"; Transliteration: "Kōrin" (Japanese: 光臨)	Shingo Uchida, Norihito Takahashi, Mai Teshima, Hitomi Ezoe	Hiroshi Seko	Masasa Itō	May 13, 2019	June 8, 2019
53	16	"Perfect Game"; Transliteration: "Pāfekuto Gēmu" (Japanese: 完全試合(パーフェクトゲーム))	Tetsuya Wakano	Hiroshi Seko	Kazuya Murata	May 20, 2019	June 15, 2019
54	17	"Hero"; Transliteration: "Yūsha" (Japanese: 勇者)	Akitoshi Yokoyama, Yoko Kanamori, Tetsurō Araki	Hiroshi Seko	Akitoshi Yokoyama	May 27, 2019	June 22, 2019
55	18	"Midnight Sun"; Transliteration: "Byakuya" (Japanese: 白夜)	Hiroyuki Tanaka, Shintarō Itoga	Hiroshi Seko	Yuzo Sato	June 3, 2019	June 29, 2019
56	19	"The Basement"; Transliteration: "Chikashitsu" (Japanese: 地下室)	Mai Teshima, Hitomi Ezoe	Yasuko Kobayashi	Masayuki Miyaji	June 10, 2019	July 6, 2019
57	20	"That Day"; Transliteration: "Ano Hi" (Japanese: あの日)	Yoko Kanamori	Hiroshi Seko	Yōko Kanamori	June 17, 2019	July 13, 2019
58	21	"Attack Titan"; Transliteration: "Shingeki no Kyojin" (Japanese: 進撃の巨人)	Yasuhiro Akamatsu	Hiroshi Seko	Yasuhiro Akamatsu	June 24, 2019	July 21, 2019 (Note: Episode 58 was pushed back a half hour (12:00 a.m. EDT/PDT) due to the re-airing of the previous week's episode, effectively airing on Sunday morning.)
59	22	"The Other Side of the Wall"; Transliteration: "Kabe no Mukōgawa" (Japanese: 壁の向こう側)	Tetsuya Wakano, Shintarō Itoga, Tetsurō Araki	Yasuko Kobayashi	Daizen Komatsuda	July 1, 2019	July 27, 2019

=== Season 4 (2020–2023) ===
No. overall	No. in season	Title	Directed by	Storyboarded by	Original release date	English air date
Part 1
60	1	"The Other Side of the Sea"; Transliteration: "Umi no Mukōgawa" (Japanese: 海の向こう側)	Kaori Makita	Jun Shishido	December 7, 2020	January 10, 2021
61	2	"Midnight Train"; Transliteration: "Yamiyo no Ressha" (Japanese: 闇夜の列車)	Daisuke Tokudo	Daisuke Tokudo	December 14, 2020	January 17, 2021
62	3	"The Door of Hope"; Transliteration: "Kibō no Tobira" (Japanese: 希望の扉)	Kōki Aoshima & Hiromi Nishiyama	Hiromi Nishiyama & Yuichiro Hayashi	December 21, 2020	January 24, 2021
63	4	"From One Hand to Another"; Transliteration: "Te kara Te e" (Japanese: 手から手へ)	Tetsuaki Matsuda	Yukio Nishimoto & Yuichiro Hayashi	December 28, 2020	January 31, 2021
64	5	"Declaration of War"; Transliteration: "Sensen Fukoku" (Japanese: 宣戦布告)	Teruyuki Ōmine	Manjiro Oshio	January 11, 2021	February 7, 2021
65	6	"The War Hammer Titan"; Transliteration: "Sentsui no Kyojin" (Japanese: 戦鎚の巨人)	Cao Yi (Note: Cao Yi's name in Japanese is "Atsushi Tsukasa") & Takahiro Kaneko	Jun Shishido	January 18, 2021	February 14, 2021
66	7	"Assault"; Transliteration: "Kyōshū" (Japanese: 強襲)	Jun Shishido	Jun Shishido & Yuichiro Hayashi	January 25, 2021	February 21, 2021
67	8	"Assassin's Bullet"; Transliteration: "Kyōdan" (Japanese: 凶弾)	Hidetoshi Takahashi, Lie Jun Yang & Yōsuke Yamamoto	Jiro Kanai & Jun Shishido	February 1, 2021	February 28, 2021
68	9	"Brave Volunteers"; Transliteration: "Giyūhei" (Japanese: 義勇兵)	Kōki Aoshima	Hiromi Nishiyama & Yuichiro Hayashi	February 8, 2021	March 14, 2021 (Note: Episode 68 was originally set to air on Adult Swim on March 7, 2021, however the February 2021 North American ice storm that hit Texas which resulted in a shutdown of its power grid caused production delays for Funimation's English dub. Adult Swim showed a rerun of the prior week's episode in its place.)
69	10	"A Sound Argument"; Transliteration: "Seiron" (Japanese: 正論)	Kaori Makita	Toshiya Niidome & Yuichiro Hayashi	February 15, 2021	March 21, 2021
70	11	"Deceiver"; Transliteration: "Itsuwari Mono" (Japanese: 偽り者)	Teruyuki Ōmine	Teruyuki Ōmine	February 22, 2021	March 28, 2021
71	12	"Guides"; Transliteration: "Michibiku Mono" (Japanese: 導く者)	Kunihiro Mori	Akira Oguro & Yuichiro Hayashi	March 1, 2021	April 4, 2021
72	13	"Children of the Forest"; Transliteration: "Mori no Kora" (Japanese: 森の子ら)	Yasuhiro Geshi & Kōnosuke Uda	Yuzo Sato & Yuichiro Hayashi	March 8, 2021	April 11, 2021
73	14	"Savagery"; Transliteration: "Bōaku" (Japanese: 暴悪)	Jun Shishido	Kazuyoshi Katayama	March 22, 2021 (Note: While airing its premiere on NHK General TV on March 15, 2021, episode 73 was halted due to a special report about an earthquake that occurred in the Wakayama Prefecture. It reaired in its complete format a week later on March 22 alongside episode 74.)	April 18, 2021
74	15	"Sole Salvation"; Transliteration: "Yuiitsu no Sukui" (Japanese: 唯一の救い)	Mitsue Yamazaki	Masayuki Miyaji	March 22, 2021	April 25, 2021
75	16	"Above and Below"; Transliteration: "Tenchi" (Japanese: 天地)	Teruyuki Ōmine, Tomoko Hiramuki, Jun Shishido, Mitsue Yamazaki & Yuichiro Hayashi	Yūki Itō	March 29, 2021	May 2, 2021
Part 2
76	17	"Judgment"; Transliteration: "Danzai" (Japanese: 断罪)	Yuichiro Hayashi	Kazuyoshi Katayama	January 10, 2022	February 13, 2022
77	18	"Sneak Attack"; Transliteration: "Damashi Uchi" (Japanese: 騙し討ち)	Jun Shishido	Yuichiro Hayashi & Akiko Kudō	January 17, 2022	February 20, 2022
78	19	"Two Brothers"; Transliteration: "Ani to Otōto" (Japanese: 兄と弟)	Teruyuki Ōmine	Yuichiro Hayashi	January 24, 2022	February 27, 2022
79	20	"Memories of the Future"; Transliteration: "Mirai no Kioku" (Japanese: 未来の記憶)	Kōki Aoshima	Yuichiro Hayashi	January 31, 2022	March 6, 2022
80	21	"From You, 2,000 Years Ago"; Transliteration: "Nisennen-mae no Kimi kara" (Japanese: 二千年前の君から)	Naoki Matsuura	Kazuyoshi Katayama & Yuichiro Hayashi	February 7, 2022	March 13, 2022
81	22	"Thaw"; Transliteration: "Hyōkai" (Japanese: 氷解)	Hidekazu Hara & Tokio Igarashi	Jun Shishido	February 14, 2022	March 20, 2022
82	23	"Sunset"; Transliteration: "Yūyake" (Japanese: 夕焼け)	Mitsue Yamazaki	Mitsue Yamazaki	February 21, 2022	March 27, 2022
83	24	"Pride"; Transliteration: "Kyōji" (Japanese: 矜持)	Kazuo Miyake	Satoshi Iwataki	February 28, 2022	April 3, 2022
84	25	"Night of the End"; Transliteration: "Shūmatsu no Yoru" (Japanese: 終末の夜)	Mitsue Yamazaki	Hiroshi Hamasaki	March 7, 2022	April 10, 2022
85	26	"Traitor"; Transliteration: "Uragirimono" (Japanese: 裏切り者)	Teruyuki Ōmine	Kazuyoshi Katayama & Yuichiro Hayashi	March 14, 2022	April 17, 2022
86	27	"Retrospective"; Transliteration: "Kaiko" (Japanese: 懐古)	Jun Shishido & Yuichiro Hayashi	Iwao Teraoka	March 21, 2022	April 24, 2022
87	28	"The Dawn of Humanity"; Transliteration: "Jinrui no Yoake" (Japanese: 人類の夜明け)	Hidekazu Hara, Mitsue Yamazaki & Tokio Igarashi	Hidekazu Hara, Kazuki Akane & Yuichiro Hayashi	April 4, 2022	May 1, 2022
Part 3: Special Version
SP–1	SP–1	"The Final Chapters (Part 1)"; Transliteration: "Kanketsu-hen (Zenpen)" (Japanese: 完結編（前編）)	Yuichiro Hayashi, Ryota Aikei, Tokio Igarashi & Jun Shishido	Yuichiro Hayashi & Ryota Aikei	March 4, 2023 (Note: Premiered on NHK General TV as a 1 hour special with no advertisement breaks)	September 10, 2023
Part 3: Episode Version
88	29	"The Rumbling"; Transliteration: "Jinarashi" (Japanese: 地鳴らし)	Yuichiro Hayashi	Yuichiro Hayashi	November 5, 2023	N/A
89	30	"The Wings of Freedom"; Transliteration: "Jiyū no Tsubasa" (Japanese: 自由の翼)	Yuichiro Hayashi & Tokio Igarashi	Yuichiro Hayashi	November 5, 2023	N/A
90	31	"In the Depths of Despair"; Transliteration: "Zetsubō no Fuchi nite" (Japanese: 絶望の淵にて)	Jun Shishido & Ryota Aikei	Yuichiro Hayashi & Ryota Aikei	November 5, 2023	N/A
Part 4: Special Version
SP–2	SP–2	"The Final Chapters (Part 2)"; Transliteration: "Kanketsu-hen (Kōhen)" (Japanese: 完結編（後編）)	Yuichiro Hayashi & Tokio Igarashi	Yuichiro Hayashi & Arifumi Imai	November 5, 2023 (Note: Premiered on NHK General TV as a 1 hour and 25 minute special with no advertisement breaks)	January 7, 2024
Part 4: Episode Version
91	32	"The Battle of Heaven and Earth"; Transliteration: "Ten to Chi no Tatakai" (Japanese: 天と地の戦い)	Jun Shishido	Yuichiro Hayashi	November 19, 2023	N/A
92	33	"Dedicate Your Heart"; Transliteration: "Shinzō o Sasageyo" (Japanese: 心臓を捧げよ)	Jun Shishido & Tokio Igarashi	Yuichiro Hayashi	November 19, 2023	N/A
93	34	"A Long Dream"; Transliteration: "Nagai Yume" (Japanese: 長い夢)	Yuichiro Hayashi & Tokio Igarashi	Yuichiro Hayashi & Arifumi Imai	November 19, 2023	N/A
94	35	"Toward the Tree on That Hill"; Transliteration: "Ano Oka no Ki ni Mukatte" (Japanese: あの丘の木に向かって)	Yuichiro Hayashi	Yuichiro Hayashi	November 19, 2023	N/A

== OADs ==
The following bonus original animation DVD (OAD) episodes were released along with selected volumes of the manga. The first one, "Ilse's Notebook," adapting a special chapter from tankōbon volume 5, was originally scheduled to be released on August 9, 2013, bundled with the volume 11 limited edition, but was postponed and included with a limited edition of volume 12, released on December 9, 2013, instead. The OAD was bundled on subtitled DVD with the English limited edition release of the 17th manga volume, released on December 1, 2015. A second OAD was released on April 9, 2014, bundled with the 13th volume of the series, this one focused on the members of the 104th Training Corps. This OAD was bundled on subtitled DVD with the English limited edition release of the 20th manga volume, released on December 27, 2016. The third OAD, "Distress," about a 104th Training Corps wilderness exercise, was released on August 8, 2014, bundled with the 14th volume of the series. On December 15, 2021, it was announced that Attack on Titan's eight OADs, (Note: The three aforementioned, plus the two No Regrets and the three Lost Girls OADs) "Distress" included, would be released subtitled by Funimation and Crunchyroll on December 19, with the dubbed release following in 2022. On May 2, 2022, it was announced that the dub will be released weekly starting on May 8, 2022. On April 27, 2022, all eight OADs were released on Blu-ray in Japan under the title Attack on Titan OAD Archive.

No. overall	No. in series	Title	Original release date	English release date
3.5	1	"Ilse's Notebook: Memoirs of a Scout Regiment Member"; Transliteration: "Iruze no Techō -Aru Chōsa Heidan'in no Shuki-" (Japanese: イルゼの手帳 ―ある調査兵団員の手記―)	December 9, 2013	December 1, 2015 (subtitled); May 8, 2022 (dubbed)
In the year 850, whilst Eren and the others are in training, the Scout Regiment goes on a mission, with Hange deciding to pursue a Titan spotted in the forest in the hopes she can capture it. As Hange gets the Titan to chase after her, it suddenly retreats to the forest. Hange follows it to the center of the forest, where she finds it banging its head against a certain tree. The Titan turns hostile when Hange gets close to it, but Levi and the others arrive and kill it, much to Hange's dismay. Upon inspecting the scene, they discover the decapitated body of Ilse Langnar, a soldier from the 34th Scout Regiment division, resting inside of the tree, and find a notebook belonging to her lying on the ground. The notebook details Ilse's records, as she escaped on foot after her squad was killed by Titans. She eventually became cornered by a Titan, but instead of killing her right away, it started to speak to her in the human language, calling her "Ymir." Ilse attempted to communicate with the Titan, but it inevitably became hostile again and bit off her head, choosing not to devour her body but instead rest it inside the tree. Having read through all of Ilse's notes, Hange uses the notebook as leverage to convince Erwin to approve of operations to capture Titans alive and study them, before returning Ilse's belongings to her grief-stricken family.
3.25	2	"The Sudden Visitor: The Torturous Curse of Youth"; Transliteration: "Totsuzen no Raihōsha -Sainamareru Seishun no Noroi-" (Japanese: 突然の来訪者 ―苛まれる青春の呪い―)	April 9, 2014	December 27, 2016 (subtitled); May 15, 2022 (dubbed)
In the year 849, Jean returns home after two years in training. After Jean gets into a dispute with Sasha following a training exercise, Commander Pyxis suggests they settle things in a cooking contest. With Armin and Annie joining Jean's team and Reiner and Conny teaming up with Sasha, the two groups head into the forest in search of a notorious giant boar to use as meat. Sasha's group come across the boar first and engage it in battle, with Sasha managing to kill it and claim it for her group. Later, after Jean is visited by his mother, shouting at her when he feels she is embarrassing him, he concocts a plan to steal some quality beef from the office so he can beat Sasha, but Armin and Annie refuse to help him. After inevitably giving up on his plan, Jean opens a lunchbox his mother left him containing an omelette, remembering all the times his mother stood by him. The cooking competition begins quickly, with Sasha showing off a prime boar steak and Jean showing off a humble omelette. Although wowed by the taste of the steak, Pyxis declares Jean the winner as he showed more skill in cooking. Content with his victory, Jean considers paying a visit to his mother.
3.75	3	"Distress"; Transliteration: "Konnan" (Japanese: 困難)	August 8, 2014	December 19, 2021 (subtitled); May 22, 2022 (dubbed)
In the year 848, the recruits are split into two groups for a wilderness exercise to learn how to sustain themselves in times of peace. Marco has trouble leading his group due to the arrogance of both Eren and Jean. Meanwhile, Mikasa's group learns of the presence of a gang of thieves, who managed to steal their Omni-directional mobility gear. That night, the thieves ambush Eren's group, taking Christa hostage along with their equipment. Putting aside their petty squabbles in order to rescue her, the group discovers the thieves' hideout, using each of their talents to come up with a plan to ambush them. After Eren and Jean manage to recover the group's maneuver equipment and put a stop to the thieves' wagons, the thieves hold Christa at knifepoint, but she is then rescued by the arrival of Mikasa and Annie after Armin had signalled for help. As the thieves are arrested, with no casualties taken, Armin wonders if the thieves' attack was part of the exercise all along.
