= Attack on Titan (TV series) =

Japanese anime television series

- 進撃の巨人; Shingeki no Kyojin
- Type: TV series
- Genre: Action; Dark fantasy; Post-apocalyptic
- Based on: Attack on Titan
- Created by: Hajime Isayama
- Directed by: Tetsurō Araki (S1–3) (Note: Credited as Chief Director (総監督) for seasons 2–3); Masashi Koizuka (S2–3); Yuichiro Hayashi (S4); Jun Shishido (S4) (Note: Credited as Chief Episode Director (演出チーフ))
- Series composition: Yasuko Kobayashi (S1–3); Hiroshi Seko (S4)
- Character designers: Kyouji Asano (S1–3); Tomohiro Kishi (S4)
- Music by: Hiroyuki Sawano; Kohta Yamamoto (S4)
- Voices of: Yuki Kaji; Yui Ishikawa; Marina Inoue
- Opening themes: List: "Guren no Yumiya" by Linked Horizon (S1A); "Jiyū no Tsubasa" by Linked Horizon (S1B); "Shinzō wo Sasageyo!" by Linked Horizon (S2); "Red Swan" by Yoshiki featuring Hyde (S3P1); "Shoukei to Shikabane no Michi" by Linked Horizon (S3P2); "My War" by Shinsei Kamattechan (S4P1); "The Rumbling" by SiM (S4P2); "Saigo no Kyojin" by Linked Horizon (S4P3/4–EP)
- Ending themes: List: "Utsukushiki Zankoku na Sekai" by Yōko Hikasa (S1A); "Great Escape" by Cinema Staff (S1B); "Yuugure no Tori" by Shinsei Kamattechan (S2); "Akatsuki no Requiem" by Linked Horizon (S3P1); "Name of Love" by Cinema Staff (S3P2); "Shock" by Yūko Andō (S4P1); "Akuma no Ko" by Ai Higuchi (S4P2); "Under the Tree" by SiM (S4P3–SP); "To You 2,000... or... 20,000 Years From Now..." by Linked Horizon (S4P4–SP); "Itterasshai" by Ai Higuchi (S4P3/4–EP)
- Country of origin: Japan
- Original language: Japanese
- No. of seasons: 4
- No. of episodes: 94 (Note: Episodes 88–94 originally aired as two television specials on NHK General TV, which premiered on March 4 and November 5, 2023. Additionally, this aforementioned episodic version, which launched on Japanese streaming services, has not been officially released internationally.) + 3 OADs (Note: Does not include No Regrets (2) and Lost Girls (3), which adapt spin-off material. If included, the total becomes 8.) (list of episodes)

Production
- Art directors: Shunichirou Yoshihara (S1–3); Kazuo Ogura (S4P1); Kuniaki Nemoto (S4P2–S4P4)
- Sound director: Masafumi Mima
- Cinematographers: Kazuhiro Yamada (S1–3); Shigeki Asakawa (S4)
- Color designers: Satoshi Hashimoto (S1–3); Ayako Suenaga (S4P1); Iku Oonishi (S4P2–S4P4)
- CG directors: Shuuhei Yabuta (S1); Shigenori Hirozumi (S2–3); Takahiro Uesono (S4P1); Subaru Ikeda (S4P2); Motoi Okunou (S4P2–S4P4)
- Editors: Aya Hida (S1–3); Masato Yoshitake (S4)
- Animation producers: Tetsuya Nakatake (S1–3); Masato Matsunaga (S4P1); Wataru Kawagoe (S4P2–S4P4)
- Studios: Wit Studio (S1–3); MAPPA (S4)
- Producers: List: Tetsuya Kinoshita; Kensuke Tateishi; Toshihiro Maeda; George Wada (S1–3); Shin Furukawa (S1); Tomohito Nagase (S1); Tetsuya Endō (S2–S3P1, S4P1–2/4); Yasuyuki Nishiya (S2–S4P1/3–4); Sōya Kiyota (S3P2); Hitoshi Itō (S4); Makoto Kimura (S4); Yasuo Onori (S4P2); Satoshi Matsumoto (S4P3)
- Production companies: Pony Canyon; Kodansha; Production I.G; Dentsu; Mainichi Broadcasting System (Note: Uncredited for the first season); Pony Canyon Enterprise (S1–3); MAPPA (S4); Qooop (S4)
- Runtime: 24 minutes (S1–2); 23 minutes (S3–4) (Note: Includes the episodic version of season 4, parts 3–4 (episodes 88–94)); 61 minutes (S4P3–SP); 84 minutes (S4P4–SP)

Original release
- Networks: MBS (S1–2); NHK General TV (S3–4)
- Release: April 7, 2013 – November 5, 2023

Related
- Attack on Titan: Junior High (2015)

Attack on Titan (Japanese: 進撃の巨人, Hepburn: Shingeki no Kyojin; lit. 'The Advancing Giant(s)') is a Japanese dark fantasy anime television series based on the 2009–2021 manga series Attack on Titan by Hajime Isayama. The series premiered on April 7, 2013, and concluded on November 5, 2023. Animated by Wit Studio (first three seasons) and MAPPA (final season), the series aired on MBS (first two seasons) and NHK General TV (final two seasons). In North America, the series has been streamed on Crunchyroll, Funimation, and Hulu. It also premiered its English dub on Adult Swim's Toonami programming block in the United States from May 3, 2014, to January 7, 2024.

Set in a post-apocalyptic world where the remains of humanity live behind walls protecting them from giant humanoid Titans, Attack on Titan follows protagonist Eren Yeager, along with friends Mikasa Ackerman and Armin Arlert. When a Colossal Titan breaches the wall of their hometown, Titans destroy the city and eat Eren's mother. Vowing vengeance, Eren joins the elite Survey Corps, a group of soldiers who fight against Titans. It chronicles Eren's journey with the Survey Corps as they battle the Titans while investigating their origins and history.

Attack on Titan has received universal critical acclaim since its debut in 2013 and is widely regarded as one of the greatest anime series of all time. Critics and audiences have praised the show for its storytelling, animation, action sequences, characters, voice acting (original and dubbed), soundtrack, and dark themes. The series received numerous accolades, achieved widespread popularity globally, and is regarded as having contributed to the expansion of anime's international audience.

== Series overview ==
Season	Episodes		Originally released	
Season	Episodes		First released	Last released
1	25		April 7, 2013	September 29, 2013
2	12		April 1, 2017	June 17, 2017
3	22	12	July 23, 2018	October 15, 2018
3	22	10	April 29, 2019	July 1, 2019
4 (Note: Parts 3 and 4 originally aired as two television specials and were later redistributed as episodes 88–94 (season 4, episodes 29–35) of the TV series.)	35	16	December 7, 2020	March 29, 2021
4	35	12	January 10, 2022	April 4, 2022
4	35	Sp.	March 4, 2023	
4	35	Sp.	November 5, 2023	

=== Season 1 ===
In the first season, protagonist Eren Yeager witnesses the death of his mother as she is eaten by man-eating giant humanoid creatures called Titans. This becomes Eren's motivation to develop his combat skills in order to join the Survey Corps, along with his childhood friends, to fight Titans and save humanity together. Five years later, the trio graduates and become scouts, leading them to their first mission to defend the Trost District from the Colossal Titan. Later on, during this battle, Eren is eaten by a Titan himself but discovers that he can transform into a Titan, subconsciously control it, and fight as he would as a human. Under the Scout Regiment leaders Erwin Smith and Levi Ackerman, Eren learns how to use his newfound powers to combat the Titans and continues his training as more Titans continue to flood into his homeland.

=== Season 2 ===
In its second season, the main cast of characters, who have graduated and joined the Survey Corps, are thrown into action looking for the damage. After searching until nightfall, two teams meet and discover the Titans breached the walls without any apparent trace of how they entered. When the graduates and their superiors are split into four teams to tell civilians to evacuate, cadet Connie Springer arrives in his hometown, Ragako where a limp and feeble Titan lays on the roof of his childhood home; the Titan alone leaves them to question how such a stunted Titan could breach Wall Sina. When some cadets take refuge in an abandoned tower, they become surrounded by Titans, sent by the abnormal Beast Titan who can communicate with not only other Titans, but humans as well. Their experienced soldiers are mercilessly killed. Faced with fear and death secrets start to unravel. Three graduate cadets are able to shift into Titans just like Eren. Along the way, the Survey Corps discover the true nature of the Titans.

=== Season 3 ===
In the two-part third season, the Survey Corps are hunted by the Interior Police, working for the secretive royal government. Serial killer Kenny the Ripper and his Anti-Personnel Squad are tasked with capturing Eren and Historia Reiss. Historia reveals that she been living under a false identity, "Krista Lenz", to hide that she is the illegitimate and sole daughter of nobleman Rod Reiss, the true king of the walls. Rod reveals she must become a Titan and consume Eren in order to reclaim his power of the Founding Titan, restoring it to the hands of the royal family. Historia nearly obeys her father, but suddenly receives memories of her half-sister Frieda Reiss, the previous Founding Titan and the only member of her family who cared for her. Simultaneously, Eren views his father Grisha's memories, learning that Grisha killed Frieda in order to steal her Titan power before passing it on to him. Historia ultimately kills her father (turned Titan), becoming Queen and de-corrupting the government, and the Scouts prepare for an operation to retake Wall Maria. They do battle with the Armored, Colossal, Beast and Cart Titans in Shiganshina District, and narrowly emerge victorious, forcing their enemies to retreat. Afterwards, reeling from the devastating battles, the surviving Survey Corps members uncover the truth: there is an entire world of human civilization beyond the walls. Eren, Mikasa, Armin, and the rest of the Scouts finally encounter the sea and see what is beyond the walls: freedom.

=== Season 4 ===
The fourth season, split into four parts and subtitled The Final Season, takes place four years after the Battle of Shiganshina District. Old enemies return alongside their new allies, forming the "Warrior Unit" of the walls' enemy nation, Marley. Marley and the walls society (the island of Paradis) battle, with each side fighting for their own ideals regarding the Power of the Titans and the "Subjects of Ymir" on Paradis who may wield it. Ultimately, Eren uses his power to release hundreds of thousands of Colossal Titans from within the walls, beginning the worldwide cataclysm known as the "Rumbling"; the Scouts and Warriors put aside their differences to battle this global threat.

== Cast and characters ==
Character	Japanese	English
Eren Yeager (エレン・イェーガー, Eren Yēgā)	Yuki Kaji	Bryce Papenbrook
Mikasa Ackerman (ミカサ・アッカーマン, Mikasa Akkāman)	Yui Ishikawa	Trina Nishimura
Armin Arlert (アルミン・アルレルト, Arumin Arureruto)	Marina Inoue	Jessie James Grelle
Levi Ackerman (リヴァイ・アッカーマン, Rivai Akkāman)	Hiroshi Kamiya	Matthew Mercer
Reiner Braun (ライナー・ブラウン, Rainā Buraun)	Yoshimasa Hosoya	Robert McCollum
Hange Zoë (ハンジ・ゾエ, Hanji Zoe)	Romi Park	Jessica Calvello
Jean Kirstein (ジャン・キルシュタイン, Jan Kirushutain)	Kishō Taniyama	Mike McFarland
Connie Springer (コニー・スプリンガー, Konī Supuringā)	Hiro Shimono	Clifford Chapin
Sasha Braus (サシャ・ブラウス, Sasha Burausu)	Yū Kobayashi	Ashly Burch (seasons 1–3)
Sasha Braus (サシャ・ブラウス, Sasha Burausu)	Yū Kobayashi	Megan Shipman (season 4)
Erwin Smith (エルヴィン・スミス, Eruvin Sumisu)	Daisuke Ono	J. Michael Tatum
Moblit Berner (モブリット・バーナー, Moburitto Bānā)	Rintarō Nishi	Jerry Jewell
Annie Leonhart (アニ・レオンハート, Ani Reonhāto)	Yū Shimamura	Lauren Landa
Hannes (ハンネス, Hannesu)	Keiji Fujiwara (season 1)	David Wald
Hannes (ハンネス, Hannesu)	Kenjiro Tsuda (seasons 2–3)	David Wald
Bertolt Hoover (ベルトルト・フーバー, Berutoruto Fūbā)	Tomohisa Hashizume	David Matranga
Bertolt Hoover (ベルトルト・フーバー, Berutoruto Fūbā)	Noriaki Kanze (young)	David Matranga
Historia Reiss (ヒストリア・レイス, Hisutoria Reisu)	Shiori Mikami	Bryn Apprill
Ymir (ユミル, Yumiru)	Saki Fujita	Elizabeth Maxwell
Marco Bott (マルコ・ボット, Maruko Botto)	Ryōta Ōsaka	Austin Tindle
Zeke Yeager (ジーク・イェーガー, Jīku Yēgā)	Takehito Koyasu	Jason Liebrecht
Zeke Yeager (ジーク・イェーガー, Jīku Yēgā)	Daiki Yamashita (young)	Jason Liebrecht
Rod Reiss (ロッド・レイス, Roddo Reisu)	Yusaku Yara	Kenny Green
Kenny Ackerman (ケニー・アッカーマン, Kenī Akkāman)	Kazuhiro Yamaji	Phil Parsons
Floch Forster (フロック・フォルスター, Furokku Forusutā)	Kensho Ono	Matt Shipman
Pieck Finger (ピーク・フィンガー, Pīku Fingā)	Manami Numakura	Amber Lee Connors
Gabi Braun (ガビ・ブラウン, Gabi Buraun)	Ayane Sakura	Lindsay Seidel
Falco Grice (ファルコ・グライス, Faruko Guraisu)	Natsuki Hanae	Bryson Baugus
Theo Magath (テオ・マガト, Teo Magato)	Jiro Saito	Neil Kaplan
Porco Galliard (ポルコ・ガリアード, Poruko Gariādo)	Toshiki Masuda	Kellen Goff
Colt Grice (コルト・グライス, Koruto Guraisu)	Masaya Matsukaze	Griffin Burns
Yelena (イェレナ, Yerena)	Mitsuki Saiga	Anairis Quiñones
Onyankopon (オニャンコポン)	Kouji Hiwatari	Zeno Robinson

== Production ==
=== Season 1 and compilation films ===
Produced by IG Port's Wit Studio and directed by Tetsurō Araki, Attack on Titan was broadcast on MBS from April 7 to September 29, 2013, and was rebroadcast on Tokyo MX, FBS, TOS, HTB, TV Aichi, BS11, and other JNN stations nationwide. The anime suffered production issues, needing more animators and with Wit Studios' character designer Kyoji Asano looking for active animators to work on the anime.

Both Funimation and Crunchyroll have streamed the series with subtitles on their respective websites. Funimation also licensed the anime for home video release in 2014. Episode 1 of the English dub premiered at Anime Boston, with other episodes put on Funimation's subscription services. On television, the series was broadcast weekly on Adult Swim's Toonami block on May 3, 2014, starting at 11:30 p.m. EST. In Australia, the anime aired on SBS 2 on Tuesdays, in Japanese with English subtitles, with the first episode having aired on September 30. The first season was acquired for distribution in the UK by Manga Entertainment. Madman Entertainment acquired the show for distribution in Australia and New Zealand, and streamed the series on Madman Screening Room.

The final episode was also shown in Japanese theaters. The season was compiled into two animated theatrical films with new voice acting from the same cast. The first film, Attack on Titan – Part 1: Crimson Bow and Arrow (劇場版「進撃の巨人」前編〜紅蓮の弓矢〜, Gekijō-ban Shingeki no Kyojin Zenpen Guren no Yumiya), covering the first 13 episodes, was released on November 22, 2014, while the second film, Attack on Titan – Part 2: Wings of Freedom (劇場版「進撃の巨人」後編～自由の翼～, Gekijō-ban Shingeki no Kyojin Kōhen Jiyū no Tsubasa), covering the final 12 episodes, adding new opening and ending footage, was released on June 27, 2015. A rebroadcast of the first season was aired from January 9, 2016, on NHK's BS Premium channel. The compilation films were also broadcast in January 2017 on MBS.

=== Season 2 and compilation film ===
A second season of the anime series was announced on the opening day of the first theatrical film, which was originally set to be released in 2016. Masashi Koizuka directed the second season, with Araki acting as chief director. It ran for 12 episodes from April 1 to June 17, 2017, on MBS and other television networks. A third compilation film recapping the events of the anime series' second season, titled Attack on Titan: The Roar of Awakening (劇場版「進撃の巨人」Season 2 ～覚醒の咆哮～, Gekijō-ban Shingeki no Kyojin Shīzun Tsū Kakusei no Hōkō), was released on January 13, 2018.

The season premiere was simulcast on Funimation, Crunchyroll, and the former's VRV channel at 10:30 AM EST. Funimation and Crunchyroll streamed the entire second season on their respective websites, while Adult Swim's Toonami aired a dubbed version. It was also announced that the second season of Attack on Titan would premiere on Toonami on April 29. It was subsequently announced on April 3 that the second season would premiere one week earlier, on April 22 instead. Madman Entertainment streamed the season in Australia and New Zealand on AnimeLab. The home media release was handled by Sony Pictures in the UK.

=== Season 3 and compilation film ===
On June 17, 2017, a third season was announced at the close of the second season's final episode, with a release date slated for July 23, 2018. A trailer for the third season was released on April 27, 2018. The series' third season aired in Japan on NHK General TV on July 23, 2018, with its first part ending on October 15 of that same year. Part 2 of the series' third season aired from April 29 to July 1, 2019. Hajime Isayama, the original manga's author and illustrator, worked closely with the animators to ensure faithfulness to the story, giving suggestions. In 2018, it was revealed that Isayama regretted doing a certain part of the manga in a certain way, so he personally requested the animation studio to make some changes in the anime. The studio honored this wish, resulting in the first part of Season 3 differing minimally from the corresponding manga chapters. A fourth compilation film, Attack on Titan: Chronicle (「進撃の巨人」 〜クロニクル〜, Shingeki no Kyojin Kuronikuru), recaps all three seasons and was released on July 17, 2020.

Funimation announced that they would air the worldwide premiere of the first episode at Anime Expo on July 8, 2018. They also announced that the first episode would air in theaters in North America alongside Attack on Titan: Roar of Awakening on July 10, 2018. Adult Swim aired the English version of the third season, starting from August 18, 2018, to July 27, 2019. On July 4, 2020, Funimation announced that they licensed the compilation film for release in the UK, Ireland, and North America.

=== Season 4: The Final Season and compilation film ===
Upon the airing of the final episode of the third season on July 1, 2019, it was announced that the fourth and final season of the anime series was scheduled for release in Fall 2020 on NHK General TV. On May 29, 2020, the final season was confirmed to have switched production studios to MAPPA. Yuichiro Hayashi and Jun Shishido replaced Tetsurō Araki and Masashi Koizuka as directors, scriptwriter Hiroshi Seko took over the series composition from Yasuko Kobayashi, and Tomohiro Kishi replaced Kyōji Asano as character designer. Kohta Yamamoto joined Hiroyuki Sawano to compose the music. On September 23, 2020, NHK listed the final season on their broadcasting schedule to air on December 7, 2020. The first part, which consists of 16 episodes, aired on NHK General TV until March 29, 2021. The second part, which consists of 12 episodes, aired from January 10 to April 4, 2022, at 12:05 a.m. JST. The third and fourth parts initially aired as two television specials; the first premiered on March 4, 2023, at 12:25 a.m. JST, while the second premiered on November 5 of the same year, at midnight JST. After the broadcast of the second special, an individual TV episode size version of both parts was distributed on multiple streaming services. Episodes 88–90, which compile the first special, began streaming on November 5, 2023, while episodes 91–94, compiling the second special, began streaming on November 19, 2023.

Attack on Titan: Special Omnibus (進撃の巨人 ―特別総集編―, Shingeki no Kyojin ―Tokubetsu Sōshūhen―) is a special series that recaps the first three seasons and the first two parts of the final season. Originally, the series consisted of six episodes and three extra broadcasts of the OVAs, and aired in Japan from October 24 to December 12, 2021, on NHK General TV. NHK rebroadcast the six episodes on January 6 and January 7, 2022, days before the premiere of episode 76. A second rebroadcast, featuring a new, seventh episode, aired from February 25 to February 27, 2023.

A fifth and final compilation film, covering the finale of the anime series and titled Attack on Titan: The Last Attack (劇場版「進撃の巨人」完結編 THE LAST ATTACK, Gekijō-ban Shingeki no Kyojin Kanketsu-hen Za Rasuto Attaku), was released on November 8, 2024; it features a new post-credits scene based on the last chapter of the alternative-universe short manga Attack on School Castes (進撃のスクールカースト, Shingeki no Sukūru Kāsuto), included at the end of volumes 21–34 of the Attack on Titan manga.

Netflix Singapore as well as other various Southeast Asian countries began streaming the series in December 2020. Adult Swim also aired the English version of the fourth season from January 10, 2021, to January 7, 2024. The subbed series was also released in Southeast Asia on iQIYI.

== Music ==
=== First season ===
For the first thirteen episodes of the first season, the opening theme is "Guren no Yumiya" (紅蓮の弓矢; lit. 'Crimson Bow and Arrow', styled in German as "Feuerroter Pfeil und Bogen") by Linked Horizon, and the ending theme is "Utsukushiki Zankoku na Sekai" (美しき残酷な世界; lit. 'This Beautiful Cruel World') by Yōko Hikasa. For episodes 14–25, the opening theme is "Jiyū no Tsubasa" (自由の翼; lit. 'Wings of Freedom', styled in German as "Die Flügel der Freiheit") by Linked Horizon, and the ending theme is "Great Escape" by Cinema Staff. Both "Guren no Yumiya" and "Jiyū no Tsubasa" were released as part of the single "Jiyū e no Shingeki" on July 10, 2013, which sold over 100,000 copies in its first week of sales.

The soundtrack for season 1 was composed by Hiroyuki Sawano, and the first CD was released on June 28, 2013, by Pony Canyon. It contains 16 tracks, including 6 vocal tracks performed by Mika Kobayashi, mpi, Cyua, Aimee Blackschleger, and CASG (Caramel Apple Sound Gadget). A second CD containing the other half of the soundtrack was released on October 16, 2013, as a bonus offered with the fourth Blu-ray and DVD limited edition volumes of the anime.

=== Second season ===
The opening theme for the second season is "Shinzō wo Sasageyo!" (心臓を捧げよ!; lit. 'Dedicate Your Heart!', styled in German as "Opfert eure Herzen!") by Linked Horizon, and the ending theme is "Yuugure no Tori" (夕暮れの鳥; lit. 'Bird at Dusk') by Shinsei Kamattechan.

Sawano returned to compose the soundtrack for the second season, with the 2-CD soundtrack released on June 7, 2017, by Pony Canyon. In addition to music composed for the season, the soundtrack also featured any and all tracks composed for other media released between seasons one and two, such as compilation films and OVAs. Vocals were provided by Yosh from Survive Said the Prophet, Gemie, mpi, Mica Caldito, Mika Kobayashi and Benjamin.

=== Third season ===
The first opening theme song is "Red Swan" by Yoshiki featuring Hyde, while the first ending theme is "Akatsuki no Requiem" by Linked Horizon. The second opening theme is "Shoukei to Shikabane no Michi" (憧憬と屍の道; lit. 'The Path of Longing and Corpses') by Linked Horizon, and the second ending theme is "Name of Love" by Cinema Staff.

Sawano once again returned as composer. The soundtrack was released on June 26, 2019. As with the second season's soundtrack, music featured in compilation films and OVAs released between season two and three was included in the soundtrack. Vocals were provided by Laco, David Whitaker, Gemie, Eliana, mpi, Yosh from Survive Said the Prophet, and Aimee Blackschleger.

=== Fourth season ===
For the fourth season, the score was directed by Masafumi Mima and composed by and Kohta Yamamoto and Sawano.

For part 1, the opening theme song is "My War" (僕の戦争; "Boku no Sensō") performed by Shinsei Kamattechan, and the ending theme song is "Shock" (衝撃, "Shōgeki") performed by Yūko Andō. For part 2, the opening theme song is "The Rumbling" performed by SiM, and the ending theme song is "Akuma no Ko" (悪魔の子; lit. 'A Child of Evil') performed by Ai Higuchi. For part 3's special, the ending theme is "Under the Tree" performed by SiM. For part 4's special, the ending theme is "To You 2,000... or... 20,000 Years From Now..." (二千年... 若しくは... 二万年後の君へ・・・; "Ni Sen-nen... Moshikuwa... ni Man'nengo no Kimi e") performed by Linked Horizon. For the individual TV episode size version of parts 3 and 4, the opening theme is "Saigo no Kyojin" (最後の巨人; lit. 'The Last Titan') performed by Linked Horizon, while the ending theme is "Itterasshai" (いってらっしゃい; lit. 'See You Later') performed by Ai Higuchi.

The soundtrack was released by Pony Canyon in three parts from June 23, 2021, to November 8, 2023. A compilation was released on July 17, 2024.

=== Anime films ===
For the first compilation film, Attack on Titan – Part 1: Crimson Bow and Arrow, the ending themes are "YAMANAIAME" (lit. 'Unstoppable Rain') by Hiroyuki Sawano feat. Mika Kobayashi, Mica Caldito & mpi and "Guren no Zahyou" (紅蓮の座標; lit. 'Crimson Coordinate') by Linked Horizon. For the second compilation film, Attack on Titan – Part 2: Wings of Freedom, the ending theme is "theDOGS" by Hiroyuki Sawano feat. mpi. The film's theme song is "Jiyū no Daishō" (自由の代償; lit. 'Cost of Freedom') by Linked Horizon.

== Reception ==
=== Sales and accolades ===
The anime series has been successful in Japan, with average sales of 52,067 across 9 volumes, with a total of 468,603 as of August 2016. It was the best-selling TV anime of 2013 in Japan and is currently the eighth best-selling anime of the 2010s in the country. It has also been very successful in the United States, with sales of at least 200,000. Additionally, it was the top streaming anime from Funimation in 2014 and the number one fan favorite Funimation home video release of 2014.

The anime adaptation won in multiple categories during the 3rd Newtype Anime Awards, including Best Director, Best Script, Best Soundtrack, Best Theme Song, Top Female Character and Title of the Year. It received the award for Best TV Animation at the 2013 Animation Kobe Awards. It received the award for Animation of the Year at the 2014 Tokyo Anime Award, along with, Best Director, Best Screenplay and Best Music. It won the 2013 Digital Contents of the Year Award at Japan's 19th annual Association of Media in Digital (AMD) Awards.

The series became the first anime to win an Astra TV Award for "Best Streaming Animated Series or TV Movie" at the inaugural and only Astra Creative Arts TV Awards edition. It was also the first recipient to receive the Global Impact Award at the 9th Crunchyroll Anime Awards in 2025.

=== Critical response ===
Attack on Titan has received widespread acclaim from critics and audiences alike and has been hailed as one of the greatest anime series of all time. The show has a rating of 96% on review aggregator Rotten Tomatoes. Carl Kimlinger of Anime News Network reviewed the first two episodes of the anime adaptation, saying, "It's hard to say what kind of show Titan would be without the operatic over-direction of Tetsuro Araki, but with him in charge, it's a clenched fist of a series: always tensed up to strike and prone to bludgeoning us when it does." Other Anime News Network critics praised much of the series. Rebecca Silverman said it "is both gorgeous and appalling in its visuals," and "an excellent mix of what 18th century Gothic novelist Ann Radcliffe defined as horror versus terror: the one is physical, making you want to look away, and the other is intellectual, making you want to know what's going to happen next." Carlo Santos noted that "few [apocalyptic action shows] get as close to perfection as Attack on Titan does". Santos described it as "a masterpiece of death and destruction" after watching only the first episode. Theron Martin of Anime News Network praised the musical score and the "intense, impactful first episode" despite his opinion that it had "limited animation". Martin also compared Attack on Titan's vibe and visual aesthetic to Claymore.

John Sinnott of DVD Talk called the series one of the best ones he had ever watched and one "that anime fans should not miss". Maya Phillips of New York magazine and Vulture praised the uniqueness of the series, stating, "In our current age of terrifying dystopian realities, it's hard to find a dystopian show with something new to deliver – and yet here it is." Phelim O'Neill of The Guardian praised the animation of the series as "spellbinding... It's all wonderfully acrobatic and intense". Regarding the climactic episodes of the third season's second half, Manga.Tokyo called Isayama a "genius" for using the revelations about Grisha's past to smoothly link present events to the beginning of the story. The series' handling of complex themes such as war, genocide, and imperialism has been the subject of much critical analysis, with its portrayal of such concepts being described as timely with respect to real world events. The anime's allusions to the Holocaust and other historical crises have been praised for their sociopolitical commentary and depth, but have also been criticized as not taking a clear stance on these issues.

Crunchyroll listed Attack on Titan in their "Top 25 best anime of the 2010s" list. IGN and Polygon also listed Attack on Titan among the best anime series of the 2010s. Lauren Orsini of Forbes included Attack on Titan on her list of the best anime series of the decade. Esquire named it one of the best anime series of 2023, while IGN and Men's Health named it one of the best of all time.

Steven Pearce, in the anime's entry in The Encyclopedia of Science Fiction, described it as "an exciting slice of Horror in SF", with its appeal attributed not only to action and violence but also to its worldbuilding and the gradual unfolding of its backstory. At the same time, the entry criticized its idealized depiction of the military and noted the controversy surrounding the portrayal of the Eldians and Marleyans, which it characterized as a clumsy allegory for Jews and Nazis.

=== Censorship ===
- : In 2015, the Ministry of Culture of the People's Republic of China forbade distribution of Attack on Titan, along with 38 other anime and manga titles, which were deemed to feature scenes of violence, pornography, terrorism and crimes against public morality, in an effort to "protect the healthy development of youth".
- : As part of Malaysia's censorship laws, it is required that parts of bodies which are considered indecent be censored, hence Titans are depicted wearing bodysuits.
- : In July 2021, the government of the Russian Federation banned the distribution of Attack on Titan among various other titles, citing "concern for the welfare of youth." Following the military invasion of Ukraine by Russia that began on February 24, 2022, the series distributor Crunchyroll shut down its subsidiaries of Wakanim and Crunchyroll EMEA in the country by its parent company Sony, due to international sanctions imposed by both Japan and the United States, thus preventing Russian viewers from legally streaming Attack on Titan.

=== Viewership ===
Attack on Titan has been described as one of the most popular anime series of all time. Vice wrote that it "[catapulted] anime into the mainstream in a way few other series have been able to outside of Japan." NPR noted that the series played a role in the broader popularization of anime. In 2021, during the first part of the final season, Attack on Titan was the most viewed television program in the United States, before it was overtaken by The Falcon and the Winter Soldier shortly before the mid-season finale. Attack on Titan broke the Guinness World Record for the "most in-demand anime TV show"; it was also the world's "Most in-demand animated TV show", until it was surpassed by Jujutsu Kaisen in 2024. The show is also the only anime series to be in TV Time's top 50 most followed TV series ever, currently at number 47, making it one of the few non-American titles and the only Japanese title on the list. In 2022, Attack on Titan won the "Most In-Demand TV Series in the World 2021" award in the Global TV Demand Awards. It was the first non-English language series to earn the Most In-Demand TV Show award, having previously been held only by The Walking Dead and Game of Thrones.

== Awards and nominations ==
Year	Award	Category	Recipient	Result	Ref.
2013	3rd Newtype Anime Awards	Best Work (TV)	Attack on Titan	Won	
2013	3rd Newtype Anime Awards	Best Director	Tetsurō Araki	Won	
2013	3rd Newtype Anime Awards	Best Script	Yasuko Kobayashi	Won	
2013	3rd Newtype Anime Awards	Best Commercial	Attack on Titan	Won	
2013	3rd Newtype Anime Awards	Best Soundtrack	Attack on Titan	Won	
2013	3rd Newtype Anime Awards	Best Theme Song	"Guren no Yumiya" by Linked Horizon	Won	
2013	3rd Newtype Anime Awards	Best Male Character	Levi Ackerman	5th place	
2013	3rd Newtype Anime Awards	Best Male Character	Eren Yeager	8th place	
2013	3rd Newtype Anime Awards	Best Female Character	Mikasa Ackerman	Won	
2013	3rd Newtype Anime Awards	Best Voice Actor	Hiroshi Kamiya	2nd place	
2013	3rd Newtype Anime Awards	Best Voice Actor	Yuki Kaji	6th place	
2013	3rd Newtype Anime Awards	Best Voice Actress	Marina Inoue	6th place	
2013	3rd Newtype Anime Awards	Best Studio	Wit Studio	Won	
2013	18th Animation Kobe Awards	Best TV Animation	Attack on Titan	Won	
2013	18th Animation Kobe Awards	Best Theme Song	"Guren no Yumiya" by Linked Horizon	Won	
2013	Animedia Character Awards	Hot	Eren Yeager	Won	
2013	Animedia Character Awards	Most Valuable Player	Eren Yeager	2nd place	
2013	Animedia Character Awards	Most Valuable Player	Levi Ackerman	3rd place	
2013	Animedia Character Awards	Strong	Levi Ackerman	Won	
2013	Animedia Character Awards	Funny	Sasha Braus	3rd place	
2013	Animedia Character Awards	Funny	Connie Springer	4th place	
2013	7th Internet Buzzwords Award	Internet Buzzword Award	"I'll destroy"	17th place	
2013	7th Internet Buzzwords Award	Anime Buzzword Award	"I'll destroy"	Won; Silver Award	
2013	7th Internet Buzzwords Award	Anime Buzzword Award	"I didn't get any results!"	6th place	
2013	7th Internet Buzzwords Award	Anime Buzzword Award	"Yeager!"	7th place	
2013	Billboard Japan Music Awards	Hot Animation of the Year	"Guren no Yumiya" by Linked Horizon	Won	
2013	Billboard Japan Music Awards	Animation Artist of the Year	Linked Horizon	Won	
2014	Anime Awards Selecta Visión	Best TV series	Attack on Titan	Won	
2014	Anime Awards Selecta Visión	Best Director TV series	Tetsurō Araki	Won	
2014	Anime Awards Selecta Visión	Best Male Lead Character	Eren Yeager	3rd place	
2014	Anime Awards Selecta Visión	Best Female Lead Character	Mikasa Ackerman	Won	
2014	Anime Awards Selecta Visión	Best Spanish Edition of a TV Series	Attack on Titan (Blu-ray+DVD Combo Edition)	3rd place	
2014	Chibi Japan Weekend Madrid	Special Award	Attack on Titan	Won	
2014	8th Seiyu Awards	Best Lead Actor	Yuki Kaji as Eren Yeager	Won	
2014	8th Seiyu Awards	Best Supporting Actress	Yui Ishikawa as Mikasa Ackerman	Won	
2014	19th AMD Awards	Grand Prize	Attack on Titan	Won	
2014	19th AMD Awards	Excellence Award	Attack on Titan	Won	
2014	21st Anime & Manga Grand Prix	Best Japanese Anime	Attack on Titan	Won	
2014	21st Anime & Manga Grand Prix	Best Theme Song	"Guren no Yumiya" by Linked Horizon	Won	
2014	13th Tokyo Anime Award	Animation of the Year (TV)	Attack on Titan	Won	
2014	13th Tokyo Anime Award	Best Director	Tetsurō Araki	Won	
2014	13th Tokyo Anime Award	Best Screenplay	Yasuko Kobayashi	Won	
2014	13th Tokyo Anime Award	Best Music	Hiroyuki Sawano	Won	
2014	36th Anime Grand Prix	Grand Prix	Attack on Titan	Won	
2014	36th Anime Grand Prix	Best Voice Actor	Yuki Kaji	Won	
2014	36th Anime Grand Prix	Best Male Character	Levi Ackerman	Won	
2014	36th Anime Grand Prix	Best Male Character	Eren Yeager	4th place	
2014	36th Anime Grand Prix	Best Female Character	Mikasa Ackerman	2nd place	
2014	36th Anime Grand Prix	Best Theme Song	"Guren no Yumiya" by Linked Horizon	Won	
2014	36th Anime Grand Prix	Editor's Choice Grand Prix	Attack on Titan	Won	
2014	ExpoManga Awards	Favorite Video Series	Attack on Titan	Won	
2014	6th Japan Character Awards	Character License Award	Attack on Titan	Won	
2014	20th Saló del Manga de Barcelona	Best Anime Series (TV)	Attack on Titan	Won	
2014	NEO Awards	Best Anime	Attack on Titan	Won	
2015	1st Sugoi Japan Awards	Best Anime Series	Attack on Titan	7th place	
2015	3rd BTVA Anime Dub Awards	Best Male Lead	Josh Grelle as Armin Arlert	Nominated	
2015	3rd BTVA Anime Dub Awards	Best Female Lead	Trina Nishimura as Mikasa Ackerman	Nominated	
2015	3rd BTVA Anime Dub Awards	Best Female Lead - People's Choice	Trina Nishimura as Mikasa Ackerman	Won	
2015	3rd BTVA Anime Dub Awards	Best Supporting Male	Matthew Mercer as Levi Ackerman	Nominated	
2015	3rd BTVA Anime Dub Awards	Best Supporting Male - People's Choice	Matthew Mercer as Levi Ackerman	Won	
2015	3rd BTVA Anime Dub Awards	Best Supporting Female	Lauren Landa as Annie Leonheart	Nominated	
2015	3rd BTVA Anime Dub Awards	Best Vocal Ensemble	Attack on Titan	Nominated	
2015	3rd BTVA Anime Dub Awards	Best Vocal Ensemble - People's Choice	Attack on Titan	Won	
2015	14th Tokyo Anime Award	Best Music	Hiroyuki Sawano	Won	
2015	33rd JASRAC Awards	Domestic Works	"Attack on Titan Background Music" by Hiroyuki Sawano	Won; Silver Award	
2015	21st Saló del Manga de Barcelona	Best Anime DVD/Blu-ray	Attack on Titan	Won	
2016	Japan Expo Awards	Daruma d'Or Anime	Attack on Titan	Nominated	
2016	Japan Expo Awards	Daruma for Best Director	Tetsurō Araki	Nominated	
2016	Japan Expo Awards	Daruma for Best Character Design	Kyoji Asano	Won	
2016	Japan Expo Awards	Daruma for Best Original Soundtrack	Hiroyuki Sawano	Nominated	
2016	Japan Expo Awards	Daruma for Best Adapted Series	Attack on Titan	Won	
2017	12th AnimaniA Awards	Best TV Series	Attack on Titan	Won	
2017	12th AnimaniA Awards	Best Director	Tetsurō Araki	Won	
2017	12th AnimaniA Awards	Best Character Design	Kyoji Asano	2nd place	
2017	12th AnimaniA Awards	Best Studio	Wit Studio	2nd place	
2017	Heroes Manga Madrid Awards	Best Anime in Spain 2016	Attack on Titan	Won	
2017	7th Newtype Anime Awards	Best Work (TV)	Attack on Titan Season 2	8th place	
2017	7th Newtype Anime Awards	Best Male Character	Levi Ackerman	5th place	
2017	7th Newtype Anime Awards	Best Female Character	Mikasa Ackerman	4th place	
2017	7th Newtype Anime Awards	Best Theme Song	"Shinzō wo Sasageyo!" by Linked Horizon	8th place	
2017	7th Newtype Anime Awards	Best Soundtrack	Attack on Titan Season 2	5th place	
2017	23rd Saló del Manga de Barcelona	Best Anime Series Broadcast in Spain	Attack on Titan Season 2	Nominated	
2017	IGN Awards	Anime of the Year	Attack on Titan	Runner-up	
2018	2nd Crunchyroll Anime Awards	Best Action	Attack on Titan Season 2	Nominated	
2018	2nd Crunchyroll Anime Awards	Best CGI	Attack on Titan Season 2	Nominated	
2018	2nd Crunchyroll Anime Awards	Best Opening	"Shinzō wo Sasageyo!" by Linked Horizon	Nominated	
2018	17th Tokyo Anime Award	Anime Fan Award	Attack on Titan Season 2	3rd place	
2018	Japan Expo Awards	Daruma d'Or Anime	Attack on Titan Season 2	Nominated	
2018	Japan Expo Awards	Daruma for Best Scenario	Hajime Isayama	Nominated	
2018	Japan Expo Awards	Daruma for Best Original Soundtrack	Hiroyuki Sawano	Won	
2018	Japan Expo Awards	Daruma for Best Simulcast	Attack on Titan Season 2	Nominated	
2018	6th BTVA Anime Dub Awards	Best Supporting Female	Lydia Mackay as Nanaba	Nominated	
2018	13th AnimaniA Awards	Best J Movie	Attack on Titan – Movie 1	Won	
2018	24th Saló del Manga de Barcelona	Best Anime Series	Attack on Titan Season 3	Won	
2018	TVstation Drama & Anime Awards	Best Anime Production	Attack on Titan Season 3	Won	
2018	TVstation Drama & Anime Awards	Best Voice Actor	Yuki Kaji as Eren Yeager	2nd place	
2018	IGN Awards	Best Anime Episode	Episode 46 – "Ruler of the Walls"	Nominated	
2019	18th Tokyo Anime Award	Anime Fan Award	Attack on Titan Season 3	8th place	
2019	3rd Crunchyroll Anime Awards	Best Ending Sequence	"Akatsuki no Requiem" by Linked Horizon	Won	
2019	30th International Pop Poll Awards	Top Japanese Gold Song	"Red Swan" by Yoshiki feat. HYDE	Won	
2019	9th Newtype Anime Awards	Best Work (TV)	Attack on Titan Season 3	8th place	
2019	9th Newtype Anime Awards	Best Screenplay	Yasuko Kobayashi	8th place	
2019	9th Newtype Anime Awards	Best Soundtrack	Hiroyuki Sawano	7th place	
2019	Funimation	Best Boys of the Decade	Levi Ackerman	Won	
2019	Funimation	Best Girls of the Decade	Mikasa Ackerman	Won	
2019	IGN Awards	Best Anime Series	Attack on Titan Season 3	Nominated	
2019	IGN Awards	Best Anime Series - People's Choice	Attack on Titan Season 3	Won	
2020	2nd Global TV Demand Awards	Most In-Demand Export from Asia	Attack on Titan	Nominated	
2020	4th Crunchyroll Anime Awards	Best Animation	Attack on Titan Season 3	Nominated	
2020	4th Crunchyroll Anime Awards	Best Director	Tetsurō Araki and Masashi Koizuka	Won	
2020	4th Crunchyroll Anime Awards	Best Fantasy	Attack on Titan Season 3	Nominated	
2020	4th Crunchyroll Anime Awards	Best Score	Hiroyuki Sawano	Nominated	
2020	4th Crunchyroll Anime Awards	Best Fight Scene	Levi vs. Beast Titan	Nominated	
2020	4th Crunchyroll Anime Awards	Best Couple	Ymir and Historia	Nominated	
2021	3rd Global TV Demand Awards	Most In-Demand Anime Series of 2020	Attack on Titan	Nominated	
2021	5th Crunchyroll Anime Awards	Best VA Performance (Portuguese)	Lucas Almeida as Eren Yeager	Won	
2021	27th Manga Barcelona Awards	Best Anime Series Premiere on Platforms/TV	Attack on Titan: The Final Season Part 1	Won	
2021	43rd Anime Grand Prix	Best Theme Song	"My War" by Shinsei Kamattechan	10th place	
2021	IGN Awards	Best Anime Series	Attack on Titan: The Final Season Part 1	Nominated	
2022	4th Global TV Demand Awards	Most In-Demand TV Series in the World	Attack on Titan	Won	
2022	4th Global TV Demand Awards	Most In-Demand Anime Series of 2021	Attack on Titan	Won	
2022	6th Crunchyroll Anime Awards	Anime of the Year	Attack on Titan: The Final Season Part 1	Won	
2022	6th Crunchyroll Anime Awards	Best Protagonist	Eren Yeager	Nominated	
2022	6th Crunchyroll Anime Awards	Best Antagonist	Eren Yeager	Won	
2022	6th Crunchyroll Anime Awards	Best Director	Yuichiro Hayashi	Nominated	
2022	6th Crunchyroll Anime Awards	Best Action	Attack on Titan: The Final Season Part 1	Nominated	
2022	6th Crunchyroll Anime Awards	Best Opening Sequence	"My War" by Shinsei Kamattechan	Won	
2022	6th Crunchyroll Anime Awards	Best Ending Sequence	"Shogeki" by Yūko Andō	Nominated	
2022	6th Crunchyroll Anime Awards	Best Fight Scene	Eren Yeager vs. War Hammer Titan	Nominated	
2022	6th Crunchyroll Anime Awards	Best VA Performance (Japanese)	Yuki Kaji as Eren Yeager	Won	
2022	6th Crunchyroll Anime Awards	Best VA Performance (Japanese)	Ayane Sakura as Gabi Braun	Nominated	
2022	6th Crunchyroll Anime Awards	Best VA Performance (Russian)	Vlad Tokarev (Влад Токарев) as Eren Yeager	Nominated	
2022	44th Anime Grand Prix	Best Theme Song	"Akuma no Ko" by Ai Higuchi	10th place	
2022	IGN Awards	Best Anime Series	Attack on Titan: The Final Season Part 2	Nominated	
2022	Reiwa Anisong Awards	Lyrics Award	"Akuma no Ko" by Ai Higuchi (Note: Ai Higuchi is credited as the nominee.)	Won	
2023	5th Global Demand Awards	Most In-Demand TV Series in the World	Attack on Titan	Nominated	
2023	5th Global Demand Awards	Most In-Demand Anime Series of 2022	Attack on Titan	Won	
2023	7th Crunchyroll Anime Awards	Anime of the Year	Attack on Titan: The Final Season Part 2	Nominated	
2023	7th Crunchyroll Anime Awards	Best Main Character	Eren Yeager	Won	
2023	7th Crunchyroll Anime Awards	Best Animation	Attack on Titan: The Final Season Part 2	Nominated	
2023	7th Crunchyroll Anime Awards	Best Director	Yuichiro Hayashi	Nominated	
2023	7th Crunchyroll Anime Awards	Best Action	Attack on Titan: The Final Season Part 2	Nominated	
2023	7th Crunchyroll Anime Awards	Best Drama	Attack on Titan: The Final Season Part 2	Won	
2023	7th Crunchyroll Anime Awards	Best Continuing Series	Attack on Titan: The Final Season Part 2	Nominated	
2023	7th Crunchyroll Anime Awards	Best Score	Hiroyuki Sawano and Kohta Yamamoto	Won	
2023	7th Crunchyroll Anime Awards	Best Anime Song	"The Rumbling" by SiM	Won	
2023	7th Crunchyroll Anime Awards	Best Opening Sequence	"The Rumbling" by SiM	Won	
2023	7th Crunchyroll Anime Awards	Best Ending Sequence	"Akuma no Ko" by Ai Higuchi	Nominated	
2023	7th Crunchyroll Anime Awards	Best VA Performance (Japanese)	Yuki Kaji as Eren Yeager	Won	
2023	Japan Expo Awards	Daruma for Best Anime	Attack on Titan: The Final Season Part 2	Nominated	
2023	Japan Expo Awards	Daruma for Best Director	Attack on Titan: The Final Season Part 2	Nominated	
2023	Japan Expo Awards	Daruma for Best Action Anime	Attack on Titan: The Final Season Part 2	Nominated	
2023	Japan Expo Awards	Daruma for Best Original Soundtrack	Attack on Titan: The Final Season Part 2	Nominated	
2023	Japan Expo Awards	Daruma for Best Opening	"The Rumbling" by SiM	Nominated	
2023	Japan Expo Awards	Daruma for Best Ending	"Akuma no Ko" by Ai Higuchi	Won	
2023	1st Astra Creative Arts TV Awards	Best Streaming Animated Series or TV Movie	Attack on Titan	Won	
2023	Reiwa Anisong Awards	Secret Anime Song Grand Prize	"To You 2,000... or... 20,000 Years From Now..." by Linked Horizon	Won	
2023	Reiwa Anisong Awards	Lyrics Award	"Itterasshai" by Ai Higuchi	Won	
2023	Reiwa Anisong Awards	Lyrics Award	"Saigo no Kyojin" by Linked Horizon (Note: Revo is credited as the nominee.)	Nominated	
2023	Reiwa Anisong Awards	Lyrics Award	"To You 2,000... or... 20,000 Years From Now..." by Linked Horizon	Nominated	
2023	Reiwa Anisong Awards	Arrangement Award	"To You 2,000... or... 20,000 Years From Now..." by Linked Horizon	Nominated	
2023	Reiwa Anisong Awards	User Voting Award	"To You 2,000... or... 20,000 Years From Now..." by Linked Horizon	2nd place	
2024	6th Global Demand Awards	Most In-Demand TV Series in the World	Attack on Titan	Nominated	
2024	6th Global Demand Awards	Most In-Demand Anime Series of 2023	Attack on Titan	Nominated	
2024	8th Crunchyroll Anime Awards	Best Main Character	Eren Yeager	Nominated	
2024	8th Crunchyroll Anime Awards	Best Supporting Character	Zoë Hange	Nominated	
2024	8th Crunchyroll Anime Awards	Best Animation	Attack on Titan: The Final Season The Final Chapters Special 1	Nominated	
2024	8th Crunchyroll Anime Awards	Best Director	Yuichiro Hayashi	Nominated	
2024	8th Crunchyroll Anime Awards	Best Action	Attack on Titan: The Final Season The Final Chapters Special 1	Nominated	
2024	8th Crunchyroll Anime Awards	Best Drama	Attack on Titan: The Final Season The Final Chapters Special 1	Won	
2024	8th Crunchyroll Anime Awards	Best Continuing Series	Attack on Titan: The Final Season The Final Chapters Special 1	Nominated	
2024	8th Crunchyroll Anime Awards	Best Cinematography	Shigeki Asakawa	Nominated	
2024	8th Crunchyroll Anime Awards	Best Score	Hiroyuki Sawano and Kohta Yamamoto	Won	
2024	8th Crunchyroll Anime Awards	Best VA Performance (Japanese)	Yuki Kaji as Eren Yeager	Nominated	
2024	Japan Expo Awards	Daruma for Best Original Soundtrack	Attack on Titan: The Final Season The Final Chapters Special 1	Nominated	
2024	Japan Expo Awards	Daruma for Best Ending	"Under the Tree" by SiM	Nominated	
2025	9th Crunchyroll Anime Awards	Best VA Performance (English)	Jessie James Grelle as Armin Arlert	Nominated	
2025	9th Crunchyroll Anime Awards	Best VA Performance (Spanish)	Miguel Ángel Leal as Eren Yeager	Won	
2025	9th Crunchyroll Anime Awards	Global Impact Award	Attack on Titan	Won	
2026	32nd Manga Barcelona Awards	Best Anime Series/Film in Physical Format (BR/DVD)	Attack on Titan – Complete Final Season	Pending	

== See also ==
- List of Attack on Titan chapters
- List of Attack on Titan novels
- Attack on Titan: Junior High, a 12-episode anime spin-off produced by Production I.G. in 2015
