= Utsukushiki Zankoku na Sekai =

Debut single by Yoko Hikasa

- Official song cover

Single by Yoko Hikasa

from the album Couleur
- Language: Japanese
- B-side: "Starting line"
- Released: May 8, 2013
- Recorded: 2013
- Genre: J-POP; Rock
- Length: 4:56
- Label: Pony Canyon
- Composer: Rei Ishizuka
- Lyricist: Mike Sugiyama

Yoko Hikasa singles chronology
"Utsukushiki Zankoku na Sekai" (2013)	"Owaranai Uta" (2013)

"Utsukushiki Zankoku na Sekai" (Japanese: 美しき残酷な世界; lit. "The Beautiful and Cruel World") is a song by Japanese singer Yoko Hikasa, whose lyrics were written by Mike Sugiyama and music composed by Rei Ishizuka. The song was released on May 8, 2013, as the debut single of Hikasa from Pony Canyon, and is best remembered for its use as the first ending theme for the first season of Attack on Titan.

== Background and production ==
The singer Yoko Hikasa had previous experience in voice acting and singing since first working on the April 2009 anime K-On!, but declined offers to debut as an artist. Her opinion reportedly changed after performing for more major roles, citing specifically her experience of performing live in the TV anime Ro-Kyu-Bu!. She decided to make her debut with a producer who had repeatedly called her beforehand.

At the production press conference for Attack on Titan on December 8, 2012, Hikasa announced that she would sing the first ending theme for the anime. She followed up with the announcement by stating that "We're working hard on it, and I think it'll be a song that fits the world of the anime". The director of Attack on Titan Tetsurō Araki reportedly supervised the creation of the lyrics to ensure the song matched the theme the show was going for. Two months later on February 8, 2013, the title of the song was announced, and the information that the song would be released to the public from Pony Canyon on May 8 of the same year. It was also announced that CDs would be released for three consecutive months starting after this songs release, with an official website being opened to coincide with the announcement. As for the recording itself, it reportedly only took the short time of three hours to complete.

== Release ==
The song was released in two versions; the first limited edition (PCCG-01343), which also included a DVD containing the music video for the song, and the regular edition (PCCG-70180). The music video was choreographed to reflect the feelings of Eren Yeager, the main character of the anime, and his desire for freedom.

The single's coupling B-side song was titled "Starting line", and was also a rock number, but faster-paced. The song was originally planned to be part of the album Glamorous Songs, but ended up not being recorded and was released along with this single.

== Live performances ==
The song was unveiled for the first time at the Attack on Titan stage event of Anime Contents Expo 2013 held on March 31, 2013, before the song was originally released. The song was also performed at Animelo Summer Live 2013 held on August 25, 2013, which was also Hikasa's first solo appearance. The song was performed live for the last time as part of Hikasa's first live tour "Le Tour de Couleur" on October 4, 2014, at Hibiya Open-Air Concert Hall.

== Track listing ==
CD Single
No.	Title	Lyrics	Music	Arrangement	Length
1.	"Utsukushiki Zankoku na Sekai"	Mike Sugiyama	Rei Ishizuka	Takayuki Negishi	4:56
2.	"Starting line"	Emi Inaba	Yuki Nara	Yuki Nara	3:37
3.	"Utsukushiki Zankoku na Sekai" (Instrumental)				4:56
4.	"Starting line" (Instrumental)				3:36
Total length:					17:06

DVD (First Limited Edition)
No.	Title	Length
1.	"Utsukushiki Zankoku na Sekai" (Music Video)

== Personnel ==
"Utsukushiki Zankoku na Sekai"

- Hiroyuki Koike – Strings
- Yuya Komoguchi – Guitar

"Starting line"

- Yuki Nara – Guitar
- Riku Sakurai – Bass
- Yamauchi Yuu – Drums

== Promotion ==
=== Magazine ===
- Lis Ani! Volume 13 (April 25, 2013)
- Seiyu Grand Prix June 2013 Edition (May 10, 2013)

=== Radio ===
- The Nutty Radio Show Onitama (May 8, 2013)
- Mucomi Plus (May 8, 2013)
- A&G Super Radio Show Anispa (May 11, 2013)

=== Television ===
- Lis Ani! TV #58 (May 10, 2013)

== Charts ==
Chart (2013)	Peak position
Billboard Japan Hot 100	35
Billboard Japan Hot Animation	8
Billboard Japan Top Singles Sales	7
Count Down TV (broadcast on May 18)	9
Oricon Daily	7
Oricon Weekly	9
Oricon Monthly	41
Soundscan Japan	5
