= Guren no Yumiya =

2013 song by Linked Horizon

- Cover for the three-track single album "Jiyū e no Shingeki", within which the song was released

Single by Linked Horizon
- Language: Japanese; German
- A-side: "Jiyū no Tsubasa" (double A-side, part of "Jiyū e no Shingeki" three-track single)
- B-side: "Moshi Kono Kabe no Naka ga Ikken no Ie da to Shitara"
- Released: 10 July 2013
- Length: 5:17
- Label: Pony Canyon
- Composer: Revo
- Lyricist: Revo
- Producer: Revo

Track listing
- Jiyū e no Shingeki track list A-side: 1. "Guren no Yumiya"; 2. "Jiyū no Tsubasa"; B-side: 1. "Moshi Kono Kabe no Naka ga Ikken no Ie da to Shitara"

"Guren no Yumiya" (Japanese: 紅蓮の弓矢; lit. 'Crimson Bow and Arrow') is one of two songs created by the Japanese band Linked Horizon for the double A-side track of their three-track single "Jiyū e no Shingeki". The full version of the song was released by Pony Canyon on 10 July 2013, and would be most notable for its use as the first opening theme to the anime Attack on Titan.

The song was the first anime theme the band Linked Horizon would create, being composed using a blend of musical genres as well as Japanese and German language lyrics. Since first being used in the anime, the song has had multiple musical artists perform cover versions of the song, and has been played most notably at the 64th NHK Kōhaku Uta Gassen and during major sporting events in Japan, including at the 2020 Summer Olympics. The song would reach the number one spot on the Billboard Japan Hot 100 and Hot Animation charts upon its debut, and would receive four awards for its melody and animation by the end of 2013. In May 2014, "Guren no Yumiya" earned a RIAJ 2× Platinum certification for half a million sales.

== Background and release ==
The song would first be released by the Japanese band Linked Horizon on 8 April 2013 in a shortened digital form as the first opening to the Attack on Titan anime series, with the full version being released later in CD form as part of the band's second single Jiyū e no Shingeki on 10 July 2013. The songs "Guren no Yumiya" and "Jiyū no Tsubasa" would also be the first anime theme songs the band would create, being the first and second openings to the anime respectively.

According to the band's head musician Revo, he would fall in love with Attack on Titan after reading the first issue of its manga. While creating the anime's first opening, Revo would meet multiple times with the original manga author Hajime Isayama and director of the anime Tetsurō Araki. "Guren no Yumiya" and the other two songs released in the single "Jiyū e no Shingeki" would by constructed to accurately convey "the feelings of the characters through poetry and music".

== Contents ==
The song employs multiple musical elements, including a blend of Japanese and German language lyrics. According to The Harvard Crimson, a "strong beat" with "swelling melodies" throughout the song is present, making it sound comparable to that of "a national anthem". Abema Times commented that the beat of the song was "heavy and fast-paced," making it a "powerful" first opening theme for an anime.

== Live performances and other usage ==
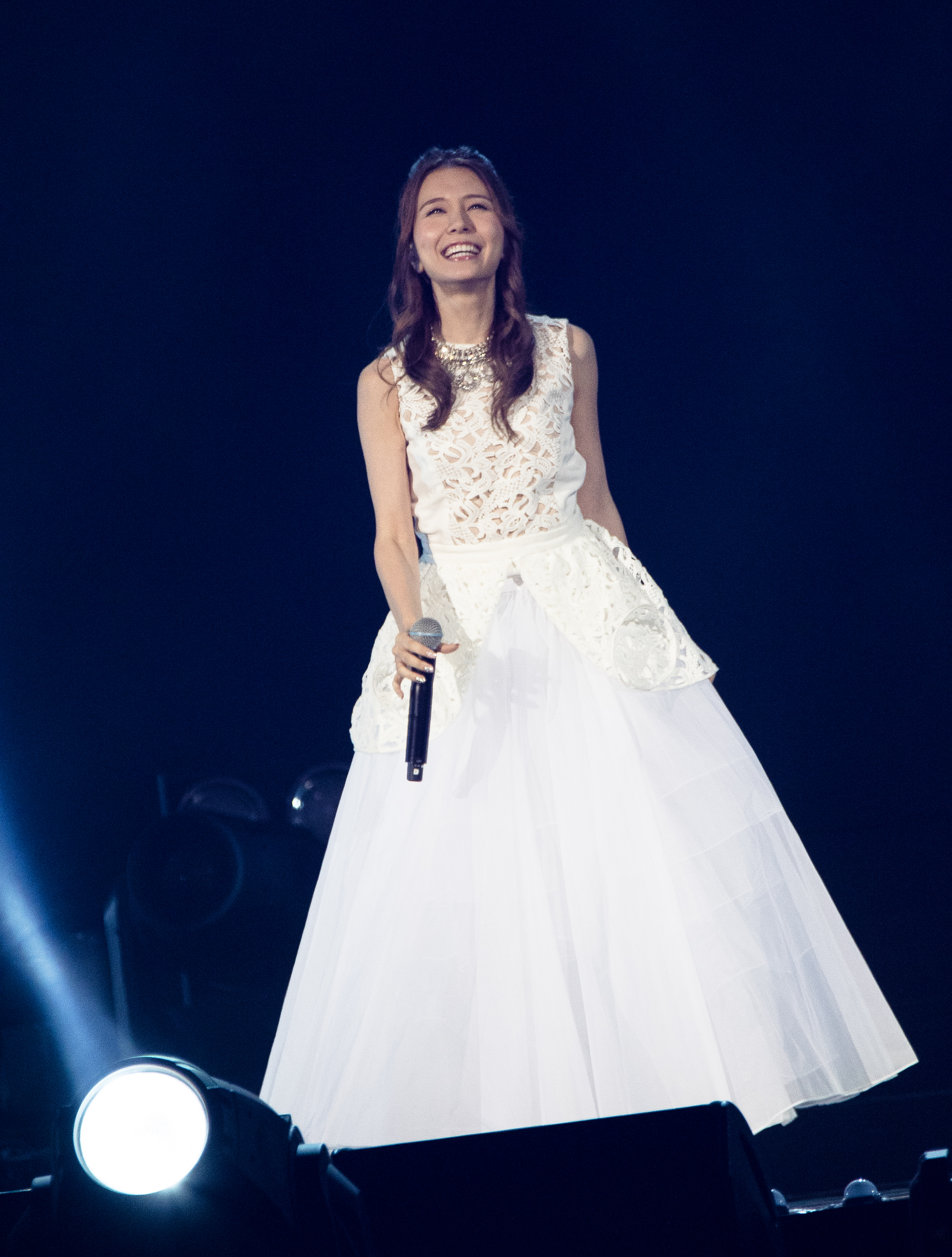
Japanese pop singer May J. performed a cover version of the song in 2020.

Since the song's first use in the Attack on Titan anime, Linked Horizon has performed the song live multiple times on TV and in-person during tours across Japan. On their first tour beginning in July 2013, Linked Horizon performed the song in the cities of Tokyo, Nagoya, and Osaka. They performed the song again on a larger tour from July to November 2017 in thirty other locations. From 5 to 7 December 2014, Linked Horizon also performed the song in Singapore on their first overseas event as part of Anime Festival Asia. The most notable performance, however, was during the 64th NHK Kōhaku Uta Gassen on 31 December 2013. In relation to Linked Horizon's performance there, the word "Jaeger" became the most tweeted word on New Year's Eve that year, relating to a major lyric in the song and a popular phrase within the anime meaning "hunter".

Other artists have also performed covers of the song. On 20 July 2015, the Japan Theater Symphony Orchestra performed the song at the anime music festival "Anime Symphonia". On 3 April 2018, the Japanese pop group The Hoopers and songwriter Kobasolo released a collaborative cover of the song. On 20 July 2018, the Dutch symphonic metal band Epica released their second EP Epica vs Attack on Titan Songs, featuring an English-language cover of the song. On 31 October 2020, the Japanese pop singer May J. performed the song at a Halloween concert at the Tokyo Garden Theater. On 12 January 2024, Japanese metal band Ryujin included a cover of the song under the same name as the eleventh track of their album "Ryujin".

Outside of artist covers, a spin-off version of the song by Linked Horizon was released on 5 October 2015 titled "Seishun wa Hanabi no You Ni" (青春は花火のように; lit. "Youth is like fireworks") as the first opening for the likewise spin-off anime Attack on Titan: Junior High. A parodied version of the song's opening animation was also created by Arizona congressman Paul Gosar that depicted New York congresswoman Alexandria Ocasio-Cortez and US President Joe Biden as Titans from the anime. After a backlash from the Democratic Party, the US House in a 223-to-207 vote deemed the video a threat and censured Gosar. The song has also been played on a seasonal Universal Studios Japan Attack on Titan-themed ride, during baseball games, and during archery at the 2020 Summer Olympics.

== Reception ==
=== Chart performance ===
"Guren no Yumiya" would reach the top position on multiple song ranking sites; including on the Amazon MP3, iTunes Store, Mora, music.jp, and Recochoku's daily anime ranking charts, second on Dwango's daily anime ranking chart, fifth on Recochoku's overall ranking, and seventh on the iTunes Store's overall rankings. The song would also take the top position on Karaoke Joysound's Monthly Chart upon the release of the full version of the song in June, taking the spot from the Golden Bomber song "Memeshikute", which had held it for the past nine months. Other chart performances are displayed below.

=== Weekly charts ===
2013 weekly chart performance for "Guren no Yumiya"
Chart (2013)	Peak position
Japan Adult Contemporary Airplay (Billboard)	28
Japan Hot 100 (Billboard)	1
Japan Hot Animation (Billboard)	1
Japan Top Singles Sales (Billboard)	1
Japan Karaoke Monthly Chart (Karaoke Joysound)	1
South Korea Digital Sales (Gaon)	27

2014 weekly chart performance for "Guren no Yumiya"
Chart (2014)	Peak position
Japan Hot 100 (Billboard)	12
Japan Hot Animation (Billboard)	2
Japan Top Singles Sales (Billboard)	23
US World Digital Song Sales (Billboard)	4

2017 weekly chart performance for "Guren no Yumiya"
Chart (2017)	Peak position
Japan Hot 100 (Billboard)	75
Japan Hot Animation (Billboard)	12

=== Year-end charts ===
2013 year-end performance for "Guren no Yumiya"
Chart (2013)	Peak position
Japan Hot 100 Chart (Billboard)	13
Japan Hot Animation Chart (Billboard)	1
Japan Top Singles Sales (Billboard)	15
Japan Karaoke Anime/Tokusatsu/Game Chart (Karaoke Joysound)	2
Japan Karaoke Chart (Karaoke Joysound)	6

2014 year-end performance for "Guren no Yumiya"
Chart (2014)	Peak position
Japan Karaoke Anime/Tokusatsu/Game Chart (Karaoke Joysound)	4
Japan Karaoke Chart (Karaoke Joysound)	11
Japan Karaoke JOYSOUND.TV Plus Chart (Karaoke Joysound)	9

=== Certifications ===
Region	Certification	Certified units/sales
Japan (RIAJ)	2× Platinum	500,000^{*}
^{*} Sales figures based on certification alone.

=== Awards ===
Year	Award	Category	Recipient	Result	ref.
2013	Newtype Anime Awards	Best Theme Song	"Guren no Yumiya" by Linked Horizon (Attack on Titan)	Won	
2013	Animation Kobe Awards	Theme Song Award	"Guren no Yumiya" by Linked Horizon	Won	
2013	Billboard Japan Music Awards	Hot Animation of the Year	"Guren no Yumiya"; Linked Horizon	Won	
2013	Anime Grand Prix	Best Anime Song	"Guren no Yumiya" (Attack on Titan)	Won	
