= Akatsuki no Requiem =

2018 song by Linked Horizon

- The Limited Edition cover for album Attack on Paradise, in which the song was released under

Song by Linked Horizon

from the album Attack on Paradise
- Language: Japanese
- Released: 19 September 2018
- Recorded: 2018
- Genre: Anime song
- Length: 4:01
- Label: Pony Canyon
- Composer: Revo
- Lyricist: Revo
- Producer: Revo

"Akatsuki no Requiem" (Japanese: 暁の鎮魂歌; lit. "Requiem of the Dawn") (also known as "Requiem der Morgenröte") is the third track created by the Japanese band Linked Horizon for their third album Attack on Paradise. Originally released in a shortened version on 30 July 2018 to be used as the fourth ending for the anime Attack on Titan, the full version would be released as part of the album about two months later on 19 September 2018.

== Background and release ==
The song would first be released in a shortened version on 30 July 2018 to coincide with the release for the first part of Attack on Titan season 3.

The full version of the song would be released about two months later on 13 September 2018 as a teaser on Music On! TV, and officially 19 September 2018 as the third track to Linked Horizon's third single Attack on Paradise under a Pony Canyon label. While the band had until this point made three songs for the anime, this was their first ending. Likewise, lead singer Revo commented that more time went into making the song than expected, as "the roles to be played are different between the opening and the ending."

== Reception ==
=== Chart performance ===
Weekly chart performance
Chart (2018)	Peak position
Japan Download Songs (Billboard)	25
Japan Hot 100 (Billboard)	16
Japan Hot Animation (Billboard)	1

=== Accolades ===
Year	Award	Category	Recipient	Result	Ref.
2018	Crunchyroll Anime Awards	Best Ending Sequence	"Akatsuki no Requiem"; Attack on Titan Season 3: Linked Horizon, sequence director Satoshi Kadowaki	Won	
