= Epica vs Attack on Titan Songs =

2017 EP by Epica

EP by Epica
- Released: December 20, 2017
- Recorded: July 2017
- Studios: Sandlane Recording Facilities, Rijen, Netherlands
- Genre: Symphonic metal
- Length: 41:17
- Labels: Ward Records; Nuclear Blast
- Producers: Joost van den Broek; Epica

Epica chronology
The Solace System (2017)	Epica vs Attack on Titan Songs (2017)	Ωmega (2021)

Singles from Epica vs Attack on Titan Songs
- 1. "Crimson Bow and Arrow" Released: May 25, 2018

Professional ratings
Review scores
Source	Rating
Blabbermouth.net	8/10
Bravewords	9/10
Louder	3.5/5 stars
Metal.de	8/10
Metal Storm	8.2/10
Screamer Magazine	Favorable

Epica vs Attack on Titan Songs is the second EP by Dutch symphonic metal band Epica, featuring covers of songs based on the anime Attack on Titan. The EP arranges selected songs originally written and composed by Revo of the Japanese band Linked Horizon with Epica's flair for heavy and massive-sounding songs with a classical motif. It was released on December 20, 2017, originally in Japan, and was released worldwide on July 20, 2018.

== Background ==
In April 2017, Epica held a concert in Tokyo, Japan. After the concert, Revo, the leader of Linked Horizon who is also an Epica fan, went to their dressing room and asked them to make English-language covers for his songs. The band accepted his proposal then started the recording process in the summer of 2017 at the Sandlane Recording Facilities studio in The Netherlands. The tracks were adapted by Epica and produced by Joost van den Broek. The choir arrangements and scoring were completed by keyboardist Coen Janssen who also handled the orchestral arrangements with Joost van den Broek.

== Track listing ==
No.	Title	Lyrics	Original title	Length
1.	"Crimson Bow and Arrow"	Mark Jansen	紅蓮の弓矢 / Guren no Yumiya	5:42
2.	"Wings of Freedom"	Coen Janssen	自由の翼 / Jiyū no Tsubasa	5:34
3.	"If Inside These Walls Was a House"	Simone Simons	もしこの壁の中が一軒の家だとしたら / Moshi Kono Kabe no Naka ga Ikken no Ie da to Shitara	3:43
4.	"Dedicate Your Heart!"	Jansen & Simons	心臓を捧げよ! / Shinzō wo Sasageyo!	5:40

Instrumental versions
No.	Title	Original title	Length
5.	"Crimson Bow and Arrow" (instrumental)	紅蓮の弓矢 / Guren no Yumiya	5:42
6.	"Wings of Freedom" (instrumental)	自由の翼 / Jiyū no Tsubasa	5:33
7.	"If Inside These Walls Was a House" (instrumental)	もしこの壁の中が一軒の家だとしたら / Moshi Kono Kabe no Naka ga Ikken no Ie da to Shitara	3:43
8.	"Dedicate Your Heart!" (instrumental)	心臓を捧げよ! / Shinzō wo Sasageyo!	5:40
Total length:			41:17

== Personnel ==
Credits for Epica vs Attack on Titan Songs adapted from liner notes.

Epica

- Simone Simons – lead vocals
- Isaac Delahaye – lead guitar, growled vocals
- Mark Jansen – rhythm guitar, growled vocals
- Rob van der Loo – bass
- Coen Janssen – keyboards, choir arrangements, orchestral arrangements, scoring
- Ariën van Weesenbeek – drums, growled vocals

Additional personnel

- Marcela Bovio – backing vocals
- Linda Janssen-van Summeren – backing vocals

Choir – Kamerkoor PA'dam

- Maria van Nieukerken – choir director
- Aldona Bartnik, Alfrun Schmidt, Annemieke Klinkenberg-Nuijten, Dagmara Siuty, Gonnie van Heugten, Daan Verlaan, Henk Gunneman, Koert Braches, René Veen, Annette Stallinga, Annette Vermeulen, Coosje Schouten, Karen Langendonk, Angus van Grevenbroek, Jan Hoffmann, Job Hubatka, Peter Scheele

Production

- Joost van den Broek – engineering, editing, mixing, orchestral arrangements
- Darius van Helfteren – mastering
- Jos Driessen – engineering, editing
- Kenichi Suzuki – design
- Tim Tronckoe – photography
- Ben Mathot – scoring
- Robin Assen – scoring

Epica Orchestra

- Ben Mathot – violin
- Marleen Wester – violin
- Ian de Jong – violin
- Judith van Driel – violin
- Floortje Beljon – violin
- Loes Dooren – violin
- Laura van der Stoep – viola
- Frank Goossens – viola
- René van Munster – celli
- David Faber – celli
- Thijs Dapper – oboe
- Henk Veldt – French horn
- Alex Thyssen – French horn
- Paul Langerman – trombone
- Lennart de Winter – trombone
- Marnix Coster – trumpet
- Jurgen van Nijnatten – trumpet

Additional orchestra

- Jeroen Goossens – flutes, low whistle, clarinet, bassoon

== Charts ==
Chart (2018)	Peak position
Austrian Albums (Ö3 Austria)	53
French Albums (SNEP)	103
German Albums (Offizielle Top 100)	48
Japanese Albums (Billboard)	68
Japanese Albums (Oricon)	82
Scottish Albums (Official Charts)	81
Swiss Albums (Schweizer Hitparade)	15
UK Independent Album Breakers (OCC)	2
UK Independent Albums (OCC)	7
UK Rock & Metal Albums (OCC)	3
US Heatseekers Albums (Billboard)	9
US Independent Albums (Billboard)	27

== See also ==
- "Jiyū e no Shingeki", original version of track 1–3.
