= Jiyū e no Shingeki =

- Standard edition cover, featuring Attack on Titan characters

Single album by Linked Horizon
- Released: July 10, 2013
- Studios: Bernie Grundman Mastering Tokyo (Shibuya, Tokyo, Japan)
- Length: 14:56
- Languages: Japanese; German
- Label: Pony Canyon
- Producer: Revo

Linked Horizon chronology
Luxendarc Shokikou (2012)	Jiyū e no Shingeki (2013)	Rakuen e no Shingeki (2018)

Singles from Jiyū e no Shingeki
- 1. "Guren no Yumiya/Jiyū no Tsubasa" Released: July 10, 2013; 2. "Moshi Kono Kabe no Naka ga Ikken no Ie da Toshitara" Released: July 10, 2013

Alternative cover
- Limited and digital editions cover, featuring Linked Horizon's Revo

"Jiyū e no Shingeki" (Japanese: 自由への進撃; lit. 'March to Freedom') is the second single by Japanese band Linked Horizon. It was released on July 10, 2013, through Pony Canyon. A three-track single, it has been certified Platinum by the RIAJ for sales in the band's home country of Japan, with over 250,000 copies sold, peaking at number two on the Oricon chart. Its double A-side tracks "Guren no Yumiya" and "Jiyū no Tsubasa" are used as the opening themes of the 2013 anime adaptation of Attack on Titan. "Guren no Yumiya" was a hit, peaking at number one on the Billboard Japan Hot 100 and fourth place on the Billboard World Digital Song Sales, and received a digital download song certification of Double Platinum from the RIAJ for sales of 500,000.

== Overview ==
The CD single includes full versions of the two opening themes to the Attack on Titan anime series, performed by Linked Horizon, the unit formed by Revo for collaboration projects.

Both opening themes contain German lyrics in the choral and vocals.

"Guren no Yumiya" (紅蓮の弓矢) / Feuerroter Pfeil und Bogen, lit. 'Fiery-red Bow and Arrow', played as the opening music to the anime which premiered April 6, 2013, and this television-version opening sequence was digitally released on April 8, 2013. Subsequently, "Guren no Yumiya" became extremely popular, its following extending beyond anime fandom. Before the CD was available, the 90-second television-sized karaoke version of the song hit top of the charts at Joysound service, despite the fact that the furigana lyrics do not flash on screen.

In June 2013, it was announced that another track from Linked Horizon, "Jiyū no Tsubasa" (自由の翼; lit. 'Wings of Freedom'), styled in German as "Die Flügel der Freiheit" in the song's lyrics, would begin usage as the second opening theme of the anime.

The single was released July 10, 2013. The title "Jiyū e no Shingeki" means "March to Freedom".

== Chart performance ==
As a digital single, the opening sequence length edit of "Guren no Yumiya" was successful, reaching number 1 on Recochoku and the iTunes Store's daily anime ranking charts and number 2 on Dwango's daily anime ranking charts. On Billboard's Hot Animation charts, the TV size edit debuted at number 7.

On the Oricon's Weekly Single Charts, "Jiyū e no Shingeki" reached the number 2 spot, charting for a total of 3 weeks, and reaching number 1 in the Daily Rankings. The Oricon reported that the single sold 129,000 copies in its first week, making it Revo's first-ever release to sell over 100,000 copies in a single week. It is also the second such theme song to sell so many copies within the first week of sales in 2013, following T.M.Revolution and Nana Mizuki's collaboration "Preserved Roses" for Valvrave the Liberator. On the Billboard Japan Hot 100, "Guren no Yumiya" debuted at number 1. It repeated this feat on the Hot Animation chart and remained at the top for two weeks. The single itself hit number 1 on the Japan Hot Single Sales chart. On the iTunes Store, "Guren no Yumiya" and "Jiyū no Tsubasa" held the number 1 and number 2 spots following their release, while only "Guren no Yumiya" topped the Recochoku, Dwango.jp, Music.jp, Mora, and the Amazon MP3 stores. Karaoke company Joysound's June 2013 rankings also show "Guren no Yumiya" at number 1, unseating Golden Bomber's "Memeshikute", which held the top ranking for 9 months.

== Kōhaku ==
At NHK's 64th annual Kōhaku Uta Gassen on New Year's Eve 2013, Linked Horizon performed a "Kōhaku Special Size" (紅白スペシャルSize, Kōhaku Supesharu Saizu) version of "Guren no Yumiya". It was released for digital download on New Year's Day 2014. This version of the song quickly reached the top of the daily charts on Dwango, Amazon MP3, animelo, mora, and Recochoku Anime, while it ranked within the top 5 on Recochoku overall; the original version of the song was also found in the Top 10 of the retailers.

== Track listing ==
All tracks are written by Revo.

Jiyū e no Shingeki standard edition
No.	Title	Length
1.	"Guren no Yumiya" (紅蓮の弓矢, "Crimson Bow and Arrow")	5:16
2.	"Jiyū no Tsubasa" (自由の翼, "Wings of Freedom")	5:28
3.	"Moshi Kono Kabe no Naka ga Ikken no Ie da to Shitara" (もしこの壁の中が一軒の家だとしたら, "If Everything Within These Walls Were Just One House")	4:12
Total length:		14:56

Jiyū e no Shingeki limited edition – disc 2 (DVD)
No.	Title	Length
1.	"Guren no Yumiya" (music video)	5:16
Total length:		20:15

Guren no Yumiya TV size
No.	Title	Length
1.	"Guren no Yumiya" (TV size)	1:34
Total length:		1:34

Guren no Yumiya Kōhaku Uta Gassen
No.	Title	Length
1.	"Guren no Yumiya" (Kōhaku special ver.)	2:28
Total length:		2:28

== Cover version ==
Dutch symphonic metal band Epica covered the single in English on their second EP Epica vs Attack on Titan Songs.

== Personnel ==
Musicians

- Revo – lyrics, music, vocals (tracks 1–2), programming, producer
- Mami Yanagi – vocals (track 3)
- Sascha Böckle – narration (tracks 1–2)
- Yuki – electric guitar, steel-string acoustic guitar
- Atsushi Hasegawa – bass
- Koji Igarashi – piano, keyboards, electronic organ, cembalo
- Jun-ji – drums
- Mataro Misawa – percussion
- Tomoyuki Asakawa – harp
- Gen Ittetsu – strings, 1st violin
- Yoshiko Kaneko, Maki Nagata, Kaoru Kuroki, Yuko Kajitani, Yayoi Fujita – 1st violin
- Takuya Mori, Osamu Iyoku, Masayoshi Fujimura, Leina Ushiyama – 2nd violin
- Shouko Miki, Daisuke Kadowaki – viola
- Kaori Morita, Masahiro Tanaka, Toshiyuki Muranaka – cello
- Yoshinobu Takeshita – contrabass
- Masanori Suzuki, Shiro Sasaki, Shinichi Yamashita, Yuki Urata – trumpet
- Kanade Shishiuchi, Makoto Igarashi, Hiroki Sato, Koichi Nonoshita – trombone
- Takashi Naitoh, Naoki Ishiyama, Takato Saijyo, Satoshi Matsuda, Yasushi Higa, Toyohide Watanabe – horn
- Masashi Kina, Atsushi Matsunaga – tuba
- Hideyo Takakuwa – flute, piccolo
- Satoshi Shoji – oboe
- Kimio Yamane – clarinet
- Toshitsugu Inoue – fagotto
- Choir -Kyo-, Ensemble Otonoha – chorus
- Yoshinori Koba – choir conductor

Production

- Hirokazu Ebisu – sound effects editor
- Suminobu Hamada, Akihiro Tabuchi – recording engineers
- Kosuke Abe, Eriko Iijima, Hiroyuki Kishimoto, Satoshi Yoneda, Chie Sato, Akiyoshi Tanaka, Satoshi Akai, Kazunori Okamoto, Yoshinori Kashiwagura – assistant engineers
- Suminobu Hamada – mixing engineer
- Yasuji Yasman Maeda – mastering engineer

Studio

- All tracks recorded / mixed / mastered at Bernie Grundman Mastering Tokyo (Shibuya, Tokyo, Japan)

== Charts ==
Weekly chart performance records for the single
Chart (2013)	Peak position
Japan Top Singles Sales (Billboard)	1
Japan Weekly Singles (Oricon)	2

Weekly chart performance records for the individual songs of "Jiyū e no Shingeki"
Title	Year	Peak chart positions		
Title	Year	JPN	KOR	US World
"Guren no Yumiya" (紅蓮の弓矢 Crimson Bow and Arrow)	2013	1	27	4
"Jiyū no Tsubasa" (自由の翼 Wings of Freedom)	2013	25	76	15
"Moshi Kono Kabe no Naka ga Ikken no Ie da to Shitara" (もしこの壁の中が一軒の家だとしたら If Inside These Walls Was a House)	2013	52	—	—

== Certifications ==
Region	Certification	Certified units/sales
Japan (RIAJ)	Platinum	250,000^{^}
^{^} Shipments figures based on certification alone.

== Awards ==
Year	Award	Category	Work/Nominee	Result
2013	Newtype Anime Awards	Best Theme Song	"Guren no Yumiya" (from anime Attack on Titan)	Won
2013	Animation Kobe Awards	Theme Song Award	"Guren no Yumiya" (from anime Attack on Titan)	Won
2013	Billboard Japan Music Awards	Hot Animation of the Year	"Guren no Yumiya" (from anime Attack on Titan)	Won
