= Masaru Kitao =

Japanese animator (born 1961)

Masaru Kitao (北尾 勝, Kitao Masaru, born July 15, 1961) is a Japanese animator known for his work with Madhouse.

Primarily a key animator and animation director for anime television series, Kitao has also on occasion done character designs. Recently, he has won much praise for his adapted character designs for the popular Death Note TV series. Consequently, Death Note has become his best known work. Along with Death Note director Tetsurō Araki, he was a Guest of Honor at Anime Expo 2007.

When asked by fans at Anime Expo 2007, he revealed that L from Death Note is his favorite character, both to empathize with and to draw. He also stated that he would like to work on an L-themed spin-off anime, and that fans in America and Japan should request one if they too are interested.

== Sequences as an Animator ==
At Anime Expo 2007, Kitao revealed some of the sequences he had been personally responsible for on several of his television and theatrical works. On the X Movie from 1996, he animated scenes of the character Hinoto, as well as drawing special-effects animation of collapsing buildings. In 1999's Cardcaptor Sakura The Movie, as assistant animation director he supervised the sequence where Sakura and Tomoyo spend the night at Syaoran's home in Hong Kong. And as a chief animator on the Cardcaptor Sakura Movie 2: The Sealed Card in 2000, he was responsible for the Mirror House sequence. Most recently, on the 2006 TV series NANA, he animated shots of the crowd dancing at Nana Osaki's concert during the opening credits.

== Notable works ==
=== Television series ===
- Azuki-chan (1995–1998) - Animation Director, Animation Supervisor, Storyboard Artist
- Cardcaptor Sakura (1998–2000) - Episode Director (episode 15), Storyboard Artist (episode 67)
- Galaxy Angel (2001–2004) - Animation Director, Storyboard Artist (season 1)
- Chobits (2002) - Animation Director (episodes 15, 21)
- Gungrave (2003–2004) - Animation Director
- Gokusen (2004) - Animation Director, Key Animator
- Rozen Maiden (2004) - Animation Director (episodes 3, 10)
- NANA (2006–2007) - Apparel Designer, Key Animator (opening credits)
- Death Note (2006–2007) - Character Designer, Chief Animation Director
- Kobato. (2009) - Key Animator (episode 1)
- Highschool of the Dead (2010) - Animation Director (episode 8)
- The Idaten Deities know Only Peace (2021) - Chief Animation Director (ED, episode 2-10 even), Assistant Chief Animation Director (episode 11), Key Animator (episode 2)

=== Feature films ===
- Yawara! Soreyuke Koshinuke Kiss!! (1992) - Key Animator
- X (1996) - Key Animator
- Cardcaptor Sakura: The Movie (1999) - Assistant Animation Director, Chief Animator
- Cardcaptor Sakura Movie 2: The Sealed Card (2000) - Chief Animator
- Metropolis (2001) - Key Animator

=== OVAs ===
- Gunbuster (1988) - Animator
- A-Girl (1993) - Key Animator
- Pops (1993) - Character Designer, Animation Director
- Oedo wa Nemurenai! (1993) - Key Animator
- Final Fantasy: Legend of the Crystals - Key Animator
- Phantom Quest Corp (1994–1995) - Key Animator
- Ichigo 100% (2004) - Chief Animation Director
- Tsubasa Spring Thunder Chronicles (2009) - Key Animator
