= ExpoManga =

Spanish anime and manga convention in Madrid

Heroes Manga Madrid
- Status: Defunct
- Genre: Anime, Manga
- Venue: IFEMA
- Location: Madrid
- Country: Spain
- Inaugurated: 2001
- Most recent: 2018
- Attendance: 44,000 (2018)
- Organizer: EasyFairs
- Website: https://www.heroesmanga.com

Heroes Manga Madrid, born as Salón del manga de Madrid and later on, ExpoManga (officially Spanish: Salón Internacional del Manga de Madrid) was a Spanish anime and manga convention held annually in Madrid. Coupled with the Heroes Comic Madrid (known previously as Expocomic) and it became the second largest anime convention in Spain after the Salón del Manga de Barcelona. Organized at first by AEAC, was later on bought by the Dutch company EasyFairs, then Conceptum!. It was held in several locations during its first years, then it settled in Madrid's Casa de Campo fairground, to be moved into the IFEMA 2017–2019. The 2019 edition was cancelled citing organization problems, promising to come back in 2020, failing to do so and with no further notices from the organizers.

Event history
Year	Official name	Date	Location	Attendance	Notable guests
2001	I Salón del Manga de Madrid	(no data)	(no data)	(no data)	
2002	II Salón del Manga de Madrid	(no data)	(no data)	(no data)	
2003	III Salón del Manga de Madrid	May 20–23	Casa de Campo (Madrid)	(no data)	
2004	IV Salón del Manga de Madrid	May 12–14	Casa de Campo (Madrid)	(no data)	
2005	ExpoManga 2005	March 31, April 1–02	Casa de Campo (Madrid)	13,295	
2006	ExpoManga 2006	May 9–11	Casa de Campo (Madrid)	18,604	
2007	ExpoManga 2007	May 2–04	Casa de Campo (Madrid)	22,687	
2008	ExpoManga 2008	May 9–11	Casa de Campo (Madrid)	33,107	
2009	ExpoManga 2009	May 8–10	Casa de Campo (Madrid)	25,398	
2010	ExpoManga 2010	May 1–03	Casa de Campo (Madrid)	27,816	
2011	ExpoManga 2011	May 6–08	Casa de Campo (Madrid)	29,024	
2012	ExpoManga 2012	May 11–13	Casa de Campo (Madrid)	31,347	
2013	ExpoManga 2013	May 10–12	Casa de Campo (Madrid)	29,876	
2014	ExpoManga 2014	May 16–18	Casa de Campo (Madrid)	40,412	
2015	ExpoManga 2015	May 8–10	Casa de Campo (Madrid)	46,213	
2016	ExpoManga 2016	May 6–8	Casa de Campo (Madrid)	50,000	
2017	Heroes Manga Madrid	April 22–23	IFEMA (Madrid)	58,000	
2018	Heroes Manga Madrid	(no data)	IFEMA (Madrid)	44,000	
2019	Heroes Manga Madrid	cancelled	IFEMA (Madrid)	(cancelled)	(cancelled)
2020	Heroes Manga Madrid	cancelled	(cancelled)	(cancelled)	(cancelled)
