= Karaoke Joysound =

Karaoke service

- Karaoke Joysound Wii in the Japanese retail package
- Developer: Xing
- Publishers: Wii: JP: Hudson Soft; NA: Konami; PlayStation 3: JP: Namco Bandai Games; Nintendo Switch: JP: Nintendo
- Platforms: Wii, WiiWare, Wii U, Nintendo Switch
- Release: Wii; Original version: JP: December 18, 2008; NA: October 30, 2012; DX version: JP: November 26, 2009; Duet Song version: JP: June 10, 2010; Enka version: JP: June 10, 2010; Super DX: Hitori de Minna de Utai Houdai! version: JP: December 9, 2010; WiiWare: JP: July 28, 2009; NA: July 17, 2014; PlayStation 3: JP: November 23, 2011; Nintendo Switch: JP: December 6, 2017
- Genre: Music
- Modes: Single-player, multiplayer

Karaoke Joysound (カラオケJOYSOUND) is a karaoke service and online song library from Japanese karaoke service provider Xing. The Joysound service, which started on various karaoke computers, was adapted into a video game by Hudson Soft for Wii, licensing the Joysound online song library alongside Xing, who also helped co-develop the game with Hudson. The game was originally released in a retail package with an included USB microphone on December 18, 2008 in Japan, and was later released there as a downloadable WiiWare game on July 28, 2009. Namco Bandai Games released a port to the PlayStation 3 titled Joysound Dive on November 23, 2011; one of only two PlayStation 3 games to enforce region locking (the other being Persona 4 Arena). It was shut down and removed from the PlayStation Store on October 31, 2014.

In January 2012, Konami (which acquired Hudson Soft and all its original IPs in 2011) announced they would release the title for the first time in North America under the simplified title Karaoke Joysound, which connected to a much different music library of well-known English songs. It was originally expected for a March 2012 release, but was delayed until October 30, 2012, and was made available as both a standard disc and a microphone bundle. On July 17, 2014, the software was re-released as a downloadable WiiWare title, without any prior announcements, for the North American Wii Shop Channel, courtesy of publishers Brother International Corp. It was originally announced for a July 3 release, but it was delayed for unknown reasons.

The software is spiritually succeeded by the Joysound-licensed Wii Karaoke U app for the Wii U in 2012, and as of July 2014 it is only available in Japan and Europe. On May 18, 2015, Konami announced the termination of the Wii Joysound service. Last date to purchase songs was July 21, 2015 and the service was shut down on October 29, 2015. A successor for the Nintendo Switch named Karaoke Joysound Switch was developed by Xing (who worked on the original games) and published by Nintendo. It was released only in Japan on December 6, 2017. Tose contributed to the Switch version during a major update in 2024.

== Overview ==
Karaoke Joysound Wii is a game "designed to provide a karaoke-club experience at home". The game requires an internet connection for players to access new songs to download. Buying tickets for songs with Nintendo Points, players rent the songs they want to sing for a limited period (from 24 hours to up to 90 days) from Xing's song library. Choosing a stage to perform on, players are able to select from a previously created avatar or use their own Miis to represent themselves. Players are also able to adjust options such as echo, key and speed of the song, and other players can use their Wii Remotes to accompany the singer by playing instruments such as cymbals and maracas.

In addition to the included microphone, the retail version includes 70 songs on disc as well as a lesson mode which trains and quizzes players on tone and rhythm, and a party mode with five minigames. Along with omitting the included songs and extra modes, the WiiWare version features a number of cosmetic changes.

== Reception ==
In the six months after release, the retail version of Karaoke Joysound Wii sold over 250,000 copies in Japan.

== Joysound Yearly Chart ==
Joysound published Top10 songs in Heisei (1989–019).

=== 2010–2019 ===
2010
Rank	Song	Artist
1	A Cruel Angel's Thesis 残酷な天使のテーゼ	Yoko Takahashi
2	Kiseki キセキ, Miracle	GReeeeN
3	Spring, summer, autumn and winter 春夏秋冬	Hilcrhyme
4	magnet	minato ft. Hatsune Miku, Megurine Luka
5	Hanamizuki ハナミズキ, Dogwood	Yo Hitoto
6	Love & Lovers 裏表ラバーズ	Wowaka ft. Hatsune Miku
7	Melt メルト	Supercell ft.Hatsune Miku
8	Meltdown 炉心融解	iroha(sasaki) ft Kagamine Rin
9	Butterfly	Kaela Kimura
10	World is Mine ワールドイスマイン	Supercell ft. Hatsune Miku

2011
Rank	Song	Artist
1	Heavy Rotation ヘビーローテーション	AKB48
2	A Cruel Angel's Thesis 残酷な天使のテーゼ	Yoko Takahashi
3	Gee Jp. Ver.	Girls' Generation
4	Kiseki キセキ, Miracle	GReeeeN
5	Mister Jp. Ver. ミスター	Kara
6	Aitakatta	AKB48
7	Ponytail to Shushu	AKB48
8	Chiisana Koi no Uta 小さな恋のうた, Little Love Song	MONGOL800
9	Arigatou ありがとう, Thank you	Ikimono-gakari
10	Maru Maru Mori Mori!	Kaoru to Tomoki, Tamani Mook

2012
Rank	Song	Artist
1	Heavy Rotation ヘビーローテーション	AKB48
2	Memeshikute 女々しくて	Golden Bomber
3	Senbonzakura 千本桜	WhiteFlame ft.Hatsune Miku
4	A Cruel Angel's Thesis 残酷な天使のテーゼ	Yoko Takahashi
5	Eikōnokakehashi 栄光の架橋, Glory bridge	Yuzu
6	Flying Get	AKB48
7	Chiisana Koi no Uta 小さな恋のうた, Little Love Song	MONGOL800
8	Kiseki キセキ, Miracle	GReeeeN
9	Matryoshka マトリョシカ	Hachi ft. Hatsune Miku, GUMI
10	Hanamizuki ハナミズキ, Dogwood	Yo Hitoto

=== 2020–2029 ===
2021
Rank	Song	Artist
1	Dried Flower ドライフラワー	Yuuri
2	Usseewa うっせぇわ	Ado
3	Yoru ni Kakeru 夜に駆ける, Into the Night	Yoasobi
4	Homura 炎	LiSA
5	Neko 猫, Cat	Dish
6	A Cruel Angel's Thesis 残酷な天使のテーゼ	Yoko Takahashi
7	Marigold マリーゴールド	Aimyon
8	Kaibutsu 怪物, Monster	Yoasobi
9	Naked Heart 裸の心	Aimyon
10	Rainbow 虹	Masaki Suda

2022
Rank	Song	Artist
1	Dried Flower ドライフラワー	Yuuri
2	Cinderella Boy シンデレラボーイ	Saucy Dog
3	Suiheisen 水平線, Horizon	Back Number
4	Marigold マリーゴールド	Aimyon
5	A Cruel Angel's Thesis 残酷な天使のテーゼ	Yoko Takahashi
6	Betelgeuse ベテルギウス	Yuuri
7	Magic Carpet 魔法の絨毯	Takaya Kawasaki
8	Zankyosanka 残響散歌, Reverbation Hymn	Aimer
9	CITRUS	Da-ice
10	Sayonara Elegy さよならエレジー	Masaki Suda

== See also ==
- Oricon Karaoke Chart
