= Tetsurō Araki =

Japanese animator and director (born 1976)

- 荒木 哲郎
- Born: November 5, 1976 (age 49); Sayama, Saitama, Japan
- Other name: Mochizuki Saburō (望月 三郎)
- Occupations: Animator, Director, Storyboard Artist
- Years active: 1999–present
- Known for: Death Note; Highschool of the Dead; Guilty Crown; Attack on Titan; Kabaneri of the Iron Fortress

Tetsurō Araki (荒木 哲郎, Araki Tetsurō; born November 5, 1976) is a Japanese animator, storyboard artist, and director. He goes by the alias Mochizuki Saburō (望月 三郎) when working as an episode director and key animator. He is best known as the director of the widely acclaimed anime adaptations of Death Note and the first three seasons of Attack on Titan.

== Biography ==
Tetsurō Araki was born in Saitama Prefecture on November 5, 1976. After graduating from Seibugakuenbunri Junior High School, Araki went on to study at Senshu University's School of Letters where he also graduated. After graduation, Araki joined Madhouse where he made his television directorial debut on the series Cardcaptor Sakura and where he directed his first original video animation (OVA) Otogi-Jūshi Akazukin.

His wife is Aya Hida (肥田 文, Hida Aya), who is also a staff member of the animation production company Gonzo.

Araki worked with animation director Takayuki Hirao when Hirao was at Madhouse, and he has occasionally worked as a key animator in projects that Hirao has directed. An article featuring him and Hirao was published in the monthly anime magazine Animage.

In October 2013, Araki won the Best Director award at the 3rd Newtype Anime Awards. He also won the Best Director award at the 2014 Tokyo Anime Award Festival. Araki, along with Death Note character designer Masaru Kitao, also appeared at Anime Expo 2007.

== Works ==
=== TV series ===
- Death Note (2006–2007) – Director
- Kurozuka (2008) – Director and series composition
- Aoi Bungaku (2009, #5–6) – Director
- Highschool of the Dead (2010) – Director
- Guilty Crown (2011–2012) – Director
- Attack on Titan (2013) – Director
- Kabaneri of the Iron Fortress (2016) – Director
- Attack on Titan Season 2 (2017) – Chief director
- Attack on Titan Season 3 (2018–2019) – Chief director

=== Films ===
- Death Note: Relight (2007–2008) – Director
- Attack on Titan: Crimson Arrows (2014) – Director
- Attack on Titan: The Wings of Freedom (2015) – Director
- Kabaneri of the Iron Fortress Recap 1: Gathering Light (2016) – Director
- Kabaneri of the Iron Fortress Recap 2: Burning Life (2017) – Director
- Kabaneri of the Iron Fortress: The Battle of Unato (2019) – Director
- Bubble (2022) – Director

=== OVA ===
- Otogi-Jūshi Akazukin (2005) – Director
- Highschool of the Dead: Drifters of the Dead (2011) – Director
- Attack on Titan: Ilse's Notebook (2013–2014, 3 episodes) – Director
- Attack on Titan: No Regrets (2014–2015, 2 episodes) – Director
