= List of Summer Time Rendering episodes =

Summer Time Rendering
- Key visual of the series
- No. of episodes: 25

Release
- Original network: Tokyo MX, BS11, Kansai TV
- Original release: April 15 – September 30, 2022

Summer Time Rendering is a Japanese anime television series based on the manga series of the same name written and illustrated by Yasuki Tanaka. The series was announced at the end of the 139th and final chapter of the manga in February 2021. It was later confirmed to be a 25-episode television series. The series was produced by OLM and directed by Ayumu Watanabe, with Hiroshi Seko overseeing the series' scripts, Miki Matsumoto designing the characters, and Kusanagi handling the art. Keiichi Okabe, Ryuichi Takada, and Keigo Hoashi composed the music at MONACA. It aired from April 15 to September 30, 2022, on Tokyo MX, BS11, and Kansai TV. (Note: Tokyo MX lists the series premiere at 24:00 JST on April 14, 2022, which is effectively April 15 at midnight.)

The first opening theme is "Hoshi ga Oyogu" (星が泳ぐ; "The Stars Swim") by Macaroni Enpitsu, while the first ending theme song is "Kaika" (回夏) by cadode. The second opening theme song is "Natsuyume Noisy" (夏夢ノイジー) by Asaka, while the second ending theme song is "Shitsuren Song Takusan Kiite Naite Bakari no Watashi wa Mō" (失恋ソング沢山聴いて 泣いてばかりの私はもう。) by Riria. Disney Platform Distribution licensed the anime for an international release on Disney+. The international release dates vary between regions, starting from May 4, 2022, in Indonesia, Malaysia, and Thailand; June 1, 2022, in Australia, Hong Kong, New Zealand, Singapore and Taiwan; and July 20, 2022, in South Korea. On January 11, 2023, the entire series was launched in subbed and dubbed options in remaining international countries, including the United States where it was launched on Hulu.

== Episodes ==
No.	Title	Directed by	Written by	Storyboarded by	Original release date
1	"Goodbye, Summer Days"; Transliteration: "Sayonara Natsu no Hi" (Japanese: さよなら夏の日)	Shinji Matsuda	Hiroshi Seko	Ayumu Watanabe	April 15, 2022
Shinpei has a dream of childhood friend Ushio telling him to protect her sister Mio. As he awakens on the ferry he accidentally falls into a woman's breasts. Shinpei is traveling home to Hitogashima Island for Ushio's funeral. Sou, another friend, reveals Ushio drowned saving young girl Shiori. That night Mio is seen outside, staring vacantly until a relative named Tetsu, Hitogashima's only police officer, comes along. Sou tells Shinpei that marks on Ushio's neck suggest she was strangled, and yet witnesses saw her drown. Mio gives Shinpei Ushio's seashell necklace. Tetsu reveals Shiori and her family have gone missing overnight. Mio reveals a week before Ushio's death, Shiori claimed to have seen a clone of herself. Nezu, the island's hunter, calls this Shadow Sickness, a disease that causes a person's shadow to come alive before killing them and their relatives. Mio claims before Ushio died they had both seen a shadow of Ushio. As the disease could supposedly be cleansed at Hito Shrine they head there only to see a shadow resembling Shiori. Hearing a gunshot they find the woman from the ferry bleeding, she attempts to speak but is shot again by a shadow of Mio who shoots Mio and Shinpei, killing them both. Shinpei suddenly awakens back on the ferry falling into the woman's breasts again.
2	"Shadows"; Transliteration: "Kage" (Japanese: 影)	Jun'ichi Yamamoto	Hiroshi Seko	Jun'ichi Yamamoto	April 22, 2022
Shinpei convinces himself it was a nightmare. However, upon arriving at the island he finds the day plays out exactly like before and notices the sound of a camera at Ushio's funeral. This time Shinpei is present when Mio stares vacantly at the house, and when Tetsu arrives he sees her murder Tetsu, causing him to realize she is Shadow Mio, and she replaces Tetsu's corpse with a Shadow Tetsu. The sound of the camera is actually the Shadow's disintegrating their victim's body into dust. Shinpei is found and stabbed by Mio. As he dies, Ushio's spirit again tells him to save Mio. He awakens again this time having already gotten off the ferry onto the island's dock. With a clearer memory this time he is able to stop Mio from falling off the dock due to the brakes on her bike being tampered with. The ferry woman is shown observing the events on the island and sending a report to someone unknown. Shinpei lodges a fake police report to keep Tetsu away that night and leaves his phone hidden to record Shadow Mio staring vacantly. He also notices one of his eyes has changed colour. He shows the recording to Mio as proof Shadow Sickness is real and her shadow intends to kill her. Mio realizes Ushio must have been murdered by Shadow Ushio.
3	"Drifting Ashore"; Transliteration: "Hyōchaku" (Japanese: 漂着)	Nobu Ishida	Hiroshi Seko	Keita Nagahara	April 29, 2022
Mio decides they should save Shiori. At Shiori's home, Shinpei finds dust piles proving Shiori's parents were killed after the funeral, and that Shiori who attended the funeral was Shadow Shiori, suggesting Shiori had been killed before Shinpei arrived on the island. He attempts to trace the woman from the ferry but is unsuccessful. Tetsu, having been away on Shinpei's fake police report, isn't killed and so Shiori's disappearance is investigated properly and a detective is invited from the mainland. He also gives Shinpei Ushio's phone, which she had given to Tetsu the day before she died; insisting Shinpei would know why. Needing more help, Shinpei tells Sou everything and Sou suggests if Shadows can be photographed they have physical bodies and can be killed. Mio suggests asking priest Hiruko at the shrine but Shinpei delays this until tomorrow since it was at the shrine where Shadow Mio killed them. Like the previous day, Mio gives Shinpei Ushio's necklace again. The next day the island holds its annual festival. Shinpei realizes Sou has a crush on Mio and after a silly confrontation Shinpei only admits to liking Mio as a sister, which seems to disappoint her. Shinpei sees what appears to be Ushio's ghost and chases her to the beach where she watches the fireworks.
4	"Jamais-vu"; Transliteration: "Jame-vu" (Japanese: 未視感(ジャメヴ))	Ryūta Yamamoto	Hiroshi Seko	Ryōta Aikei	May 6, 2022
Ushio is convinced she is alive again and can remember that she died wanting to tell Shinpei she loved him. Shinpei suspects she is a shadow that actually believes she is Ushio. Ushio insists on seeing her friends and family but Shinpei angrily refuses. Mio calls Shinpei's phone, which Ushio answers before he can stop her, forcing him to lie to Mio. Forcing Ushio to stay hidden Shinpei meets Mio at the shrine where Sou suddenly confesses his love to Mio, though Mio rejects him. Ushio reveals herself and is devastated when Mio believes she is a shadow and calls her a monster. Shinpei suddenly reveals he is actually Shadow-Shinpei, scolds Ushio for drawing unwanted attention, and then breaks her wrist. Ten minutes previously Shinpei had found Shadow-Mio with a Shadow-Shinpei, who had copied his memories while at Shiori's house. He copies Shinpei's latest memories and realizes that Shinpei has been looping back in time, so he stops Mio from killing him to prevent this and goes to meet Ushio at the shrine, claiming she really is Shadow-Ushio, who – for some reason – has betrayed her fellow shadows. Mio begins torturing Shinpei, revealing that their ultimate plan is to resurrect their sleeping mother. Shinpei is suddenly saved by the woman from the ferry, who shoots Shadow-Mio in the head.
5	"Maelstrom"; Transliteration: "Uzu" (Japanese: 渦)	Shinji Matsuda	Hiroshi Seko	Ayumu Watanabe	May 13, 2022
Shadow-Mio disappears and the woman introduces herself as Nagumo Ryuunosuke who is there to save him. She reveals how to tell Shadows apart from humans; since their true form is the shadow flat on the ground and not the fake body above it. Shinpei rushes to the shrine and finds everyone killed by a Giant-Shadow. Giant-Shadow identifies Shinpei's eye as the eye of their Mother, which controls time. Shadow-Ushio still insists she is human and rejects her fellow Shadows. Mio is disintegrated. Giant-Shadow absorbs the other Shadows and disintegrates all the dead humans, sending out a massive Shadow in every direction that disintegrates every human on the island. A red light appears over the shrine as Mother awakens, a young girl Nagumo recognizes as someone called Haine. With everyone dead Shinpei pleads for Nagumo to kill him so he can start over. Giant-Shadow tries to stop them but he is stopped by Shadow-Ushio, allowing Nagumo to shoot Shinpei in the head, declaring next time she will definitely save him. As he flies back in time, Ushio once again tells him to save Mio. Arriving back on his first day he realizes the distance he can travel back is slowly shrinking as he now appears not on the ferry or even the docks, but almost arriving at Mio's house. With three days until Mother's resurrection he is determined to do it right this time.
6	"Orbital Resonance"; Transliteration: "Kidō Kyōmei" (Japanese: 軌道共鳴)	Yoshitsugu Kimura	Hiroshi Seko	Shingo Kaneko	May 20, 2022
On this rewind it is revealed Nagumo reached the island already aware of the Shadows presence. The island priest, Karikiri Masahito, greets her at the funeral as Minakata Hizuru, revealing she grew up on the island. Shinpei, determined to do things right, uses Nagumo's trick for detecting Shadows and realizes at the funeral that Shiori and both her parents were already Shadows. Shinpei receives Nagumo's phone number in a code from Ushio's father Alan and solves it, but Nagumo had given her phone to her contact on the island, Nezu Ginjirou, who answers the phone. To test if Shinpei is human, Nezu shoots Shinpei's shadow, proving he is human. Meanwhile Nagumo does the same on Alan in the bathroom and in a surprise attack smashes his shadow with a hammer, killing Shadow-Alan instantly. Shinpei meets Nezu who now trusts him and introduces him to Nagumo. Using coded references Shinpei is able to communicate certain facts to Nagumo so that she instantly knows Shinpei is a time traveler who has met her before in the future and is someone her future-self trusted. Shinpei cries as he finally has an ally who knows everything.
7	"Deadly Enemy"; Transliteration: "Kyūteki" (Japanese: 仇敵)	Yū Harima	Hiroshi Seko	Miyuki Sugawara	May 27, 2022
Nagumo reveals to Shinpei that a Shadow murdered her family 14 years ago, causing her to leave the island and change her name, later publishing a series of books about the experience. Nezu reveals that if a Shadow who has copied someone is killed, that person can never be copied again. Nagumo goes to Shiori's home to kill Shadow-Shiori and her Shadow parents. Based on her behaviour, Shinpei suspects the trauma of losing her family caused Nagumo to develop two personalities, one being the sister Hizuru who wrote the books, and the other being her murdered younger brother, Ryuunosuke. Nagumo kills the parents while Nezu and Shinpei catch Shiori in a trap. She admits she was the Shadow who killed Ushio and that once their plan is complete her and her family can go home, so Nagumo kills her. Nagumo confirms she has two personalities; she is Hizuru most of the time but Ryuunosuke comes out when she cannot cope or in a fight. Nagumo is their joint fake name and they communicate by recording messages on a tape recorder. Shinpei returns home and finds Mio cooking, which she never does, causing Shinpei to realize his actions have somehow changed events. As he sends her out of the room, trying to return events to normal, Shadow-Ushio suddenly appears.
8	"Memento"; Transliteration: "Memento" (Japanese: メメント)	Yūri Hagiwara	Hiroshi Seko	Akinori Fudesaka	June 3, 2022
Surprised, Shinpei notes that Shadow-Ushio appeared much earlier than normal. She remembers the previous loop and wants to prevent all the deaths from Mother's resurrection. She hides from Mio in his room. As she eats, he pokes her shadow, which she feels, confirming she is a Shadow. He prepares to destroy her, but cannot bring himself to do it. She accidentally makes her clothes disappear, forcing her to wear his spare clothes, and finds that she cannot retreat into her shadow like the other Shadows. Shadow-Mio suddenly enters and attacks, but Ushio shields Shinpei. Shadow-Mio stabs her shadow to injure her arm and demands to know why she betrayed them, and Ushio says because she loves Shinpei. Nezu shoots Shadow-Mio with a sniper rifle, allowing Shinpei to stab her shadow and destroy her. Nagumo enters and after assuring that Mio is safe, tries to destroy Ushio, but Shinpei pleads for her life. Nagumo suddenly recognizes Ushio's voice as the one that brought her to the island. They try to treat her arm, but it disappears. Nagumo replays a voicemail where Ushio's voice warns her about the Shadows and tells her to trust Shinpei, but Ushio doesn't remember that or recognize her. Nagumo and Nezu spare her, but warn that if she steps out of line, they will kill her. The next day, Shinpei and Ushio reveal her presence to Sou, who freaks out for a bit. They give Ushio her phone and she unlocks it to find a video recorded on the day she died.
9	"My Flowing Tears"; Transliteration: "Nagareyo Waga Namida" (Japanese: 流れよ我が涙)	Hotline	Hiroshi Seko	Keisuke Inoue	June 10, 2022
The video shows Ushio and Shadow-Ushio as friends. Ushio was aware she would probably die soon and wanted Shinpei to know Shadow-Ushio is not evil. She explains the first Shadow was Shiori's with Shadow-Ushio appearing soon after. They tracked Shadow-Shiori to the island's old abandoned clinic once run by Sou's father Seido. There another Shadow attempted to copy Ushio and attacked Shadow-Ushio, injuring her by hitting her shadow and proving she was the copy. They killed the new Shadow then recorded the video for Shinpei which he could only watch if Shadow-Ushio used her fingerprint to unlock the phone. Saddened by the video Shadow-Ushio shows them what happened next from a recording of her memories. On the day Ushio drowned they had been trying to keep Shiori safe from Shadow-Shiori. Unfortunately they failed, Shiori was killed and replaced by Shadow-Shiori who then drowned Ushio and Shadow-Ushio swore to help Shinpei save everyone before the 24th when Mother returns. Suddenly, Shadow-Ushio realizes her memories have been hijacked as the memory of Shadow-Shiori comes alive and attacks Shinpei before morphing into Mother who swears Shinpei won't escape again. Shadow-Ushio ends the recording but when they awaken Shinpei has a hand shaped bruise where Mother grabbed him, proving it really happened.
10	"Into the Darkness"; Transliteration: "Yami no Naka e" (Japanese: 闇の中へ)	Jun'ichi Yamamoto	Hiroshi Seko	Jun'ichi Yamamoto	June 17, 2022
Shinpei announces they need to head back to the old clinic. A police officer named Miura approaches Mio and her friend Tokiko to ask about Shiori's family. At the clinic Sou finds old bottles of Mercuric Chloride, a toxic medicine. He also discovers a wooden statue of Ebisu, God of Fishermen, but as this statue is female Shinpei realizes it actually depicts Ebisu when he was born as a leech like creature believed to be both male and female. They locate a secret door but no key. Shinpei realizes the statue depicts Hiruko as pregnant, causing Shadow-Ushio to discover the key inside the stomach. Inside they find a tunnel Shadows could be using to move around unseen. They find a Shadow with the body of a deformed baby and manage to kill it when it attacks. Shadow-Ushio starts bleeding and realizes the injury given to her by Shadow-Mio wasn't actually healed; just temporarily hidden, meaning her Shadow body is still badly injured. They hear a sudden gunshot and follow the noise from the tunnel into a natural cave. Shadow-Ushio panics as they realize the cave is filled with hundreds of Shadow-Babies who quickly surround them.
11	"Dinner Time"; Transliteration: "Shokuji no Jikan" (Japanese: 食餌(しょくじ)の時間)	Nobu Ishida	Hiroshi Seko	Hiroaki Shimura	June 24, 2022
Nezu and Nagumo prepare to enter the sewers. Shadow-Shiori appears to both Mio and Tetsu. As Shiori is technically a missing child Tetsu is forced to follow her. After killing the Shadow-babies Shinpei sees the cave is covered in coral and connects to the ocean. Ushio's arm grows noticeably worse and as the only way to heal it would be to copy Ushio again, which is impossible. To temporarily stop the pain she deletes her damaged arm. Tokiko suddenly appears. Nezu realizes the cave is the lost Hiruko Cave where Hiruko originally washed ashore, the entrance to which was sealed by the army during the First Sino-Japanese War. They witness Mio and Tetsu and decide to save them. Shinpei attempts to shoot Tokiko's shadow, only to realize she is human. Sou's father is seen with the murdered body of Officer Miura that he feeds to the Shadows. Sou realizes his father and sister are both working with the Shadows. Nezu and Nagumo meets Shadow-Shiori and realize she is actually Mother disguised as Shiori, whom Nagumo greets by the name Haine. Giant-Shadow appears and kills Nezu before seriously injuring Nagumo. Tokiko decides to show them the truth but asks Shinpei to keep it a secret from Mio, no matter what happens, and Shinpei agrees. She takes them to a shrine where Haine is shown receiving medical treatment.
12	"Bloody Night"; Transliteration: "Chi no Yoru" (Japanese: 血の夜)	Jun Shinohara	Hiroshi Seko	Masashi Kojima	July 1, 2022
Tokiko explains that Haine is Hiruko and for generations their family has served her by feeding her dead bodies from their family clinic. Haine eats the body of Miura and almost eats Ushio's body, which was replaced with a fake before the cremation. Tokiko reveals she serves Haine because she promised to resurrect their dead mother once she regains her powers. Shinpei and Shadow-Ushio manage to steal Ushio's body which Shadow-Ushio scans, repairing her damaged arm. Shinpei tries to shoot Haine but Giant-Shadow, who has captured Mio, severs Shinpei's fingers. Giant-Shadow betrays Tokiko and shoots her and Sou. Tetsu finds the injured Nagumo who asks him to carry her to Shinpei. Haine removes her eye from Shinpei's head but it returns to him; instead she captures Shadow-Ushio to reprogram her. Giant-Shadow reveals Shinpei's power actually lets him view multiple potential timelines and select one to Render into existence, but he can only use it when his brain experiences death, so they will forcibly keep him alive. Giant-Shadow then kills Mio. Tetsu arrives with Nagumo who attempts to shoot Shinpei, but Giant-Shadow kills her instead. Shinpei swallows the Mercuric Chloride from the clinic, killing himself. Shadow-Ushio begins to resist Haine and even to fight back against her. Giant-Shadow tries to kill Shadow-Ushio but she is pulled back in time by Shinpei and they reappear at the meeting with Nagumo and Nezu where Shinpei first convinced Nagumo he is a time traveller.
13	"Friends"; Transliteration: "Tomodachi" (Japanese: トモダチ)	Hayato Sakai	Hiroshi Seko	Hayato Sakai	July 8, 2022
Shinpei and Ushio are looped back to the moment he revealed himself as a time traveler to Hizuru and Nezu. Hizuru realizes, that Shinpei's eye, which allows him to loop is made from Shadows and that Ushio granted him this power. They decide to work together to the end, to avoid failure, after which Ushio shows them her memories from previous loops. Sou attempts to talk to his father, but Seido brushes him off. Shinpei, Ushio, Hizuru and Nezu show up at the Kobayakawa household, expecting the same victorious outcome. Unfortunately for them, Haine and Shide - the four-armed Shadow - were inside, lying in wait. Hizuru is sent out flying through the window, and the four-armed Shadow crushes her head, while also piercing Nezu's. Haine reveals, that the mark placed on Shinpei allows them to follow him through all loops, and basically loop together with him. Before he could be captured by the Shadows, Ushio lops Shinpei's head off. Instead of instantly looping back, Shinpei and Ushio end up in a memory of Hizuru's from 14 years ago, seeing her together with the real Ryuunosuke. They follow the siblings to the Kofune restaurant, where Shinpei sees his parents alive, hanging out with Karikiri and Alan. Hizuru reveals to her younger brother and Asako, her best friend, that she made a new friend on Takanosu mountain. They go out in the rain to the mountain, ending up at the old Hishigata clinic, where Hizuru reveals, that her friend is Haine, who awaits them in the clinic.
14	"to be/not to be"	Makaria	Hiroshi Seko	Yasunori Watanabe	July 15, 2022
Shinpei and Ushio take a trip through Hizuru's memories as a high schooler, flashing in and out of on various encounters she had with Haine on the second floor of the Hishigata clinic. Hizuru and Haine gradually grow closer, owing to Hizuru's frequent trips to the clinic. On one of these trips, Hizuru runs into Nezu by chance, who is out snake-hunting. He warns Hizuru to find a less dangerous path to traverse, but she persists. This persistence leads to concern on the part of Ryuunosuke and Asako, who grow worried when Hizuru doesn't return from Koba Mart on time. They deduce that this is likely due to her "friend" on Mount Takanosu. Ryuunosuke, out of concern that Hizuru would grow too fascinated with her activities, traces his footsteps to the old Hishigata clinic. On the way, he encounters a distraught Haine, who promptly kills him. Hizuru, noticing the flash, runs toward it, only to find a bloodied Haine consuming her younger brother. Hizuru confronts Haine, who goes into a frenzy and loses an eyeball and panickedly sinks into a shadow to escape. Left alone, two Shadow-Babies creep up on Hizuru, threatening to consume her, too. As they are about to attack, Nezu intervenes, saving Hizuru. Ryuunosuke's data then enters Hizuru, and he takes over their now-shared body to deal with the Shadow-Babies. Hizuru is then shown leaving Hitogashima. From a distance, Haine proclaims that the next time they meet, she will kill her. Shinpei and Ushio then loop to a moment in time right before they attempt to deal with Shiori at the Kobayakawa residence. He nixes the plan and forms a new one, using Ushio's ability to impart memories to recruit the Hishigata siblings, Totsumura and Mio. However, just as they are about to take action, Shinpei loops again, meaning he was killed instantaneously.
15	"Lights, Camera, Action"; Transliteration: "Raitsu, Kamera, Akushon" (Japanese: ライツ カメラ アクション)	Tetsuo Yajima	Hiroshi Seko	Tetsuo Yajima	July 22, 2022
Shinpei realizes what happened and concludes that it was a mistake to leave Nezu so far away. He also notices that the "event horizon" has caught up with him, so if he dies too soon, he will no longer be able to loop and they will lose. The group prepares to make their stand at the school, just as Haine, Shide and hundreds of Shadows boldly approach. Tokiko, Sou and Mio work together to defeat and capture Shadow-Mio, while Nezu and Hizuru/Ryuunosuke take down groups of Shadows. Haine and Shide chase after Ushio and Shinpei. Shide absorbs dozens of Shadows to gain strength and speed, closely trailling after Ushio, who leads them into the gym. Thinking they have her cornered, Ushio surprises them, by turning her hair into gasoline she had copied and dousing them. Shinpei lights Shide and Haine on fire, the dozens of Shadows bonded to the former die instantly, but Haine escapes from the fire. Totsumura provides a distraction, which allows Shinpei to shoot Haine down and Ushio to grab her. As she begins corrupting her, the visibly weakened Shide pulls Ushio into the fire and shoots Shinpei. Shide wants to test his theory, that Ushio would permanently die, if she is killed before Shinpei, but Ushio has tricked him and struck from behind. As she begins erasing him, she reveals a human body within Shide, but Haine uses her last strength to copy and erase all the air in the gym. The fires go out, and they are able to escape, while Shinpei and Totsumura almost suffocate. Afterwards, Shinpei rushes to Ushio's side, who seems to be exhausted. Seeing her concerns, Shinpei reveals, that he is mostly fine, as he learned online how to make a bulletproof vest. The group rejoices, that they won and everyone survived, and Ushio is presented with Shadow-Mio, whom she cuts off from Haine's control.
16	"Original"; Transliteration: "Orijinaru" (Japanese: オリジナル)	Yoshitsugu Kimura	Hiroshi Seko	Kenji Maeba	July 29, 2022
Shinpei grills Shadow-Mio about her origins and abilities of Shadows. Shadow-Mio is resolute, that she is now on their side. Tokiko is furious, that Mio was copied, unbeknownst to her. The group chooses their next goal, to capture and interrogate Seido Hishigata. Finding the Hishigata household empty, they head for the clinic, where Tokiko leads them down to a secret entrance in the morgue, connected to Hiruko Cave. In the cave, they find the Shadow of Chitose Hishigata, strangling her husband. Ushio is able to corrupt her, freeing her from Haine's command. Sou resuscitates his father, but he is unwilling to talk and shoots Tokiko in cold blood. However, Tokiko is revealed to be Shadow-Mio, as the real Tokiko was copied and stayed behind to protect the real Mio. Seeing how unresponsive Seido is, Shadow-Mio attempts to copy him, to no avail. Realizing, that he was already copied and his copy killed, Seido breaks down. Shinpei sees Negoro escaping with real Ushio's corpse. As the real Tokiko arrives, Seido reveals, that his dream was for the entire family to become Shadows and leave together with Haine, to the higher plane of existence she came from. He explains, that if Haine is to be killed, all other Shadows, including Chitose and Ushio, will die, though the latter is prepared to make that sacrifice. Seido and Tokiko retrieve a ledger from a hidden safe, detailing the people who were fed to Haine, Shinpei's parents among them. Seido details how the Ajiro marine biologists discovered Hiruko Cave, forcing Shide to kill them and Seido to feed them to Haine.
17	"Determination"; Transliteration: "Ketsudan" (Japanese: 決断)	Noriko Tajiri	Hiroshi Seko	Ryūshi Tokunaga	August 5, 2022
Ushio tells Hizuru about the memories of child Hizuru they saw, theorizing that the section of Haine that broke off when she devoured Ryuunosuke is what became Ushio today. Ushio is afraid that she'll turn evil like Haine did, but Hizuru promises to kill her if it happens. Mio and Shadow-Mio have a heart-to-heart, where the latter reveals that they hate themselves, for not being more like Ushio. Seido tells Sou, that their mother actually passed years ago. Tokiko soothes Shinpei, telling him to sleep already, as he hasn't slept since he started looping. At night, Nezu and Ushio go back to his home, where Nezu has finally decided to put down the Shadow, that copied and killed his wife. Shide absorbs Negoro to rejuvenate his Shadow body. Mio provides some of real Ushio's hair for Ushio to heal herself. The team splits off for separate missions, Shinpei and Ushio begin hunting down the Shadow of their middle-school teacher Kanae Hitobuchi, while the others investigate the lives and homes of people, who have been turned into Shadows and defeated at the gym. After defeating the Shadow of Kanae, Ushio has a moment, where she speaks like Haine. The team regroups, suspicious of the lack of real threats and Shadow activity. They surmise, that the Shadows are hiding out, till the festival, so they decide to go talk to Karikiri, the priest, in order to cancel the festival.
18	"Face to Face"; Transliteration: "Taimen" (Japanese: 対面)	Jun'ichi Yamamoto	Hiroshi Seko	Jun'ichi Yamamoto	August 12, 2022
Shinpei and Ushio sit down to talk with Karikiri, while the others listen in. After some pleasantries, Shinpei holds him at gunpoint and tosses him photos of himself from decades ago, revealing that Seido has told him, that Karikiri is actually Shidehiko Hishigata, founder of the Hishigata clan, husband to the original Haine, when Hiruko came to the island and copied her and that he is actually a human-Shadow hybrid progeny who maintains his youth by having his memories and personality copied and placed into a hybrid body birthed through actual conception with Haine every few years. Shinpei attempts to convince him to give up Haine, but Shide taunts Shinpei about murdering his parents. Ushio, not wanting Shinpei to become a murderer, steps in and sliced the top half of Shide's head off. Relieved for a moment, they are too late to realize, that this Shide was a clone, and the real one, still burned from the injuries sustained at the gym, slices Ushio in half and impales Shinpei on a tree with his naginata. Hizuru and Tokiko are too late to step in, and Shinpei dies, looping back to when he and Ushio saved the kids from the Shadow of their teacher, but this time without Ushio. Shinpei breaks down, as he was ready to die once to learn the truth about his parents, but not ready to lose Ushio.
19	"Made in Black"; Transliteration: "Meido in Burakku" (Japanese: メイドインブラック)	Nobu Ishida	Hiroshi Seko	Akinori Fudesaka	August 19, 2022
Haine summons Shadows to attack Shinpei and the kids. However, as Shinpei reaches for Ushio's seashell necklace in his pocket, Haine is startled and the Shadows retreat. Shinpei tries calling the others, but there is no service in the mountains. In the meantime, Haine uses the guise of Shinpei to call Hizuru's group to the small northern island of Torajima. Shinpei realizes that Haine has copied him in the third loop and now uses that guise in the current eighth loop, when he hears from Alan that the others have already gone out to meet him. Shinpei finds Shadow-Mio nailed down, who shows him her memories of Mio nailing her down, after the disguised Haine told her that Ushio's hacking came undone with her erasure. Haine calls Shinpei and gives him the ultimatum: to save Hizuru, Nezu, Totsumura and Tokiko on Torajima from Haine and Shide or to save Sou and Mio in Alan's garden from the second Shide. Ryuunosuke duels Shide, being able to keep up with his corpse armor form for a while, before Hizuru comes out and they are able to talk directly to each other. Hizuru relays a strategy that would allow them to win and gives Ryuunosuke permission to do whatever it takes, even if it breaks her body.
20	"All is (not) lost."	Yū Harima	Hiroshi Seko	Miyuki Sugawara	August 26, 2022
Hizuru is able to discern from memories of past loops, that Shide's goals might be different from Haine's and tries to pit them against each other. Ryuunosuke is able to disarm Shide, after which Hizuru transfers his data directly into Shide's armor, which is composed of empty Shadows, allowing Ryuunosuke to take control of the armor and create his own body. However, without Ryuunosuke holding her up, Hizuru's muscles and bones receive irreparable damage, forcing Tokiko to jump in with her Shadows. Meanwhile, Shinpei and Shadow-Mio are held up by the other Shide, who reveals that Sou and Mio were already taken to be fed to Haine's real body, a fact which Shadow-Mio confirms as she can feel Mio die. She decapites Shide and tries scanning him, but she only unveils that Shide's body holds no memories. They follow a bloody trail from the sewers and find Tokiko mortally wounded, having barely escaped after Nezu and Totsumura sacrificed themselves. Shinpei decides to loop, shooting himself. He immediately rescues Shadow-Mio, with whose Shadow powers they are able to catch up and save Sou and Mio, before they would be set upon by Shide at Alan's garden. Using the sewers and Shadow-Mio's powers, Shinpei makes it to Torajima and rendezvous with the others quickly. Unfortunately for them, Shinpei looping gave enough intel for Haine to feed to Shide about their battle, thus they find that Shide has already impaled Hizuru on his naginata. Though dismayed, Shinpei again reaches in his pocket, triggering Haine into forcing a retreat. Shinpei attempts to loop to save Hizuru, but Shadow-Mio disarms him, warning him of the closeness of his limit. With her dying breath, Hizuru insists that Shide and Haine's goals are actually different and that Shide is actually using her. Before passing away, Hizuru entrusts Shinpei with Ryuunosuke's data.
21	"Shinpei Ajiro's Longest Day"; Transliteration: "Ajiro Shinpei no Ichiban Nagai Hi" (Japanese: 網代慎平の一番長い日)	Katsuya Ōshima	Hiroshi Seko	Katsuya Ōshima	September 2, 2022
As Shinpei mourns Hizuru on the beach, Seido informs him about the whereabouts of her corpse. Shinpei insists that the cause of death should be ruled as murder and they begin theorizing about the existence of the second Shide. To Seido's surprise, Shinpei predicts a lightning strike. Shadow-Mio helps Shinpei realize why Haine and Shide were scared of the seashell necklace, as Ushio stored her memories and what she scanned of Shide in it before dying. As such, Shinpei has an epiphany, that the original Ushio from the third loop, who somehow latched onto him in all further loops, would return to Omoto beach on the 24th, the day of the festival. Sou blames himself for not being able to help Shinpei bear the burdens of responsibility. Later on, he decides to tell Mio how he feels again, who again friendzones him. However, Sou prompts Mio to confess her feelings to Shinpei too, who reveals that he thinks of her as a little sister only, still being in love with Ushio. Tokiko soothes Mio, while Shadow-Mio theorizes that Mio could still have a chance with Shinpei, since her "competition" would be erased together with Haine. Shinpei and Tokiko explain his realization to Seido, Nezu and Sou. Shinpei shows how the seashell necklace keeps pointing south, towards the Ushio Shadow still lost at sea, after Shiori's attack. They theorize that the high tides would bring her onland at a later time, so they decide to go search with the help of Tokiko's baby Shadow Guildenstern preemptively. On the 24th, Shide announces that the festival is moving to the beach, with a grieving Alan at his side. Through Shinpei, Ryuunosuke thanks Nezu for saving Hizuru years ago. Haine arrives in Shinpei's form to talk with Shide, but not without Totsumura noticing him. Haine realizes that Shinpei's location is blocked the same way as Shide's is, when he's wearing the Shadow armor. Shide retorts, that all the stray Shadows are out at sea, led by the second Shide in the search for Ushio. Though noticed by the Shadows, Shinpei is able to reunite with the comatose Ushio, awakening her and restoring her memories and abilities with the seashell necklace. Although Shide is able to destroy Guildenstern, Ushio lets loose, repelling Shide and destroying several strays.
22	"Return"; Transliteration: "Hōmukamingu" (Japanese: 帰還)	Hotline	Hiroshi Seko	Yasunori Watanabe	September 9, 2022
Shide notices that his armor and the Shadows attacked by Ushio are not regenerating, so he realizes that Ushio can erase Shadows just by touch now. After noticing the injuries Shinpei sustained from Ryuunosuke using his body, she lunges at Shide. Shadow-Mio, who was disguised as Shinpei's watch, stops her and shares the plan with her. Haine, using Shinpei's guise, tries to determine his plan, before telling Shide to stop Shinpei from shooting himself. Thanks to the two-second foresight of Ryuunosuke, Shinpei avoids Shide's attack, and kills himself, taking Ushio along into the next loop. Shinpei and Ushio loop back, and the group exits Guil, at which point Haine is reviled by the fact, that Shinpei really set the loop starting point to the group already inside Hiruko cave. Haine immediately sends "priest" Shide down to her real body in the cave, falling into Shinpei's plan to hold off the festival massacre. The group is held up by strays so Tokiko decides to stay and buy time for the others with Guil's help. However, further off, the group is stopped by a wall of Shadows, which is part of Hiruko's very body. Shinpei also reveals his secret weapon, copied fireworks from the festival which Shadow-Mio provided. While Shide and Haine - in Shinpei's form - hurry down to her real body, the fireworks break through the wall and the group proceeds. The second Shide catches up to them at the wall, so Nezu stays behind to hold him off. The group arrives at Hiruko's real body, where Haine and Shide strike from above. Ushio forces Shide on the defensive, but Shinpei can't use Ryuunosuke's ability for the killshot while Haine can relay it to Shide telepathically. However, Shadow-Mio startles Haine and she falls into the trap, her shadow pinned by Sou. Mio wounds Haine, and she can't relay info to Shide, allowing Ushio to punch his face off and kill him. Unfortunately, the second Shide - having absorbed tons of strays - is able to break through the shadow wall. Ushio wards off his attacks and is able to pummel Haine's giant shadow. Shide's shadow armor fades away and Shadow-Mio stabs him in the brain. Shinpei finds Ushio, as she displays Haine's red eye in her right eye once more. Both Shinpei and Ushio's right eyes bleed profusely, while Shadow-Mio is baffled by the fact that she and Ushio are still alive. Just then, the faceless Shide from the festival in the third loop emerges.
23	"Everlasting Night"; Transliteration: "Tokoyo" (Japanese: 常世)	Hanako Ueda	Hiroshi Seko	Hanako Ueda	September 16, 2022
The third Shide emerges with the mortally wounded Haine, reduced to a toddler form. He berates Haine, now useless to his goal. Shinpei voices his disgust of Shide, who promptly slices Haine's shadow open, revealing an entrance to the timeless world of Shadows. As he jumps in with what remains of Haine, Shinpei and Ushio follow suit, resolved to prevent his end goal. Shinpei awakens in the timeless world, separated from Ushio. Ryuunosuke takes control of his body to alleviate his pain and they bond during their search for Shide and Ushio. They follow Ushio's signal to the mirrored town on Hitogashima, finding her in the middle of a breakdown, surrounded by stray Shadows. Ushio realizes that she was born from the part of Hiruko which was originally Haine, the original human she copied and the one Hizuru befriended. The original Haine emerges from her and emphasizes that Shide is the one who forced Haine/Hiruko on his conquest, in order to gain her eyes, with which he could control space and time. Shinpei concludes that Shide has become obsessed with "pulling the plug" on the world, like a 2D character in a video game disconnecting the console in the 3D world, which is the "ending" he desires. Just then, a fleet of American B-29 fighter planes begin bombarding the whole of Wakayama, with Shide riding one of them, the remains of Hiruko's baby body tethered to his armor. Haine explains that the aerial fleet was forcefully summoned by Shide through Hiruko's memories. Haine stops the projectiles mid-air, creating a path for Ushio to reach Shide. As they engage in battle, Ushio is injured and is forced to use a younger copy of herself, but she manages to erase the left half of Shide's armor. To her shock, the armor is empty on the inside, and she realizes that Shide is still in the real world, remote-controlling the armor through Hiruko, having only baited them into the Shadow world so they could no longer have either a two second or loop advantage. The armor lunges for Ushio as she falls from the sky, unconscious.
24	"Summertime re-rendering"	Haru Shinomiya	Hiroshi Seko	Tetsuo Yajima	September 23, 2022
Ryuunosuke grabs Ushio from the sky, and Haine remarks that Ushio's body is in severe shape and she cannot fight anymore. Shinpei proposes that Ryuunosuke possess Shide's armor. Having gained telepathy akin to Hiruko, Ushio tells Shinpei and Ryuunosuke that she can turn herself into shotgun shells which would hack away the armor, but she needs time. Shide is shocked at Haine's betrayal, lunging at them. Ryuunosuke, using Shinpei's body, is able to fight on even terms with Shide for a while, using copies of Hizuru's shotgun and sledgehammer. Shide sacrifices one of his right arms to give himself a left one, in order to be able to shoot again. Shide attempts to reach Ushio, so Ryuunosuke is forced to punch him, breaking off a couple of Shinpei's fingers. Shide takes advantage of this and hurries behind Shinpei, cutting his left arm off in the process. After Shide gains the upper hand and keeps injuring the body, Shinpei convinces Ryuunosuke to try possessing Shide's armor. Shinpei collapses from the pain, while Ryuunosuke tries holding Shide down for Shinpei to shoot. Unfortunately for them, Shide has the memories from his initial fight with Hizuru, where she did the same thing to him, something which Shinpei hadn't witnessed. As such, Shide dispels Ryuunosuke and pins him down. Without a Shadow in his body, Shinpei starts to disintegrate. Shide starts crying, explaining that he originally wanted to live forever with Hiruko, before coming to terms with potential mortality. This is what drove him to want to become omnipotent and see the true "ending" of all life. While Shinpei limps to the shotgun, Ushio having provided the bullets, Shide moves to strike. Ushio and Haine are barely able to move the shotgun closer to Shinpei, who is able to dodge and shoot Shide's armor. As the armor disintegrates, Shide in the real world, revealed to be his wrinkled original body from three hundred years ago, also dies, since the armor had been keeping that body alive. When Ushio goes to erase baby Hiruko, they are transported to the memory of her arriving on the island as a whale. Shinpei realizes that Hiruko brought them there, not to loop again from the start as a whale, but to end it all. Shinpei sees the child Haine arrive and scares her away from approaching the whale, while Ushio erases it. As the Shadows begin disintegrating, Ushio attempts to return Shinpei to his body, but he is despondent. Shinpei wants to slowly fade away together with Ushio, since his body is mortally wounded. Having confessed their feelings to each other, Ushio sends Shinpei back to the moment he first bumped into Hizuru on the boat, while she delves even further into the collective timelines to the very beginning of the series to give Shinpei her right eye and Hizuru the message to come to the island before she ultimately vanishes.
25	"I'm Home"; Transliteration: "Tadaima" (Japanese: 「ただいま」)	Toshihiro Maeya	Hiroshi Seko	Ayumu Watanabe	September 30, 2022
Now in a timeline where Shadows no longer inhabit the world at the present day, Shinpei awakes on the boat with Hizuru, blurting out her real identity, but no longer remembering where he learned it from or why he was so concerned about her well being. Mio, Tokiko and Sou greet him on the pier, where he realizes he came back because Ushio called him a day before. As they begin walking home, they run into Ushio who attempts to punch Shinpei, since she is still angry about him leaving two years ago, before running off. Mio leads Shinpei to Alan's shop, where he catches up with Alan and Totsumura. Shinpei goes to the Hito shrine, where the elderly Karikiri Iwao and his son meet up with him. They tell Shinpei that Ushio has been searching for her seashell necklace non-stop for two days. He goes to her and they make up after he finds her the necklace once more. They talk about the fact that they both had the same strange dream. Back at Alan's, Shinpei sits down with Hizuru for an autograph, while also detailing his weird dream to her. Ryuunosuke shows up with Asako, and their children Shiori and Haine, with the latter being the birthday girl. The summer festival begins, wherein Hizuru begins writing haphazardly, since her discussion with Shinpei got her out of a writer's block; Sou attempts courting Mio again, while Tokiko secretly watches; Shinpei and Ushio go to watch the fireworks together down by the beach. Ushio asks Shinpei why he only bought her one Takoyaki before they both remember the promise they made, seemingly regaining a subconscious memory from the previous timelines. The next day on July 25, everyone celebrates Ushio's 18th birthday.
