= Saho Shirasu =

Japanese voice actress

- 白砂 沙帆
- Born: 19 August
- Occupation: Voice actress
- Years active: 2017–present
- Employer: Mausu Promotion
- Notable work: The Detective Is Already Dead as Charlotte Arisaka Anderson; Immoral Guild as Noma Rune; Summer Time Rendering as Mio Kofune; Xicatrice as Toma Asahi

Saho Shirasu (Japanese: 白砂 沙帆, Hepburn: Shirasu Saho; born 19 August) is a Japanese voice actress from Wakayama Prefecture, affiliated with Mausu Promotion. After making her 2017 debut as Ion Mirna in the video game Layered Stories Zero, she joined Mausu Promotion after entering their training school, and she has since starred as Charlotte Arisaka Anderson in The Detective Is Already Dead, Noma Rune in Immoral Guild, Mio Kofune in Summer Time Rendering, Toma Asahi in Xicatrice, and Yoko Shiraki in Time Patrol Bon.

== Biography ==
Saho Shirasu, a native of Wakayama Prefecture, was born on 19 August. In 2017, she made her voice acting debut as Ion Mirna in the video game Layered Stories Zero, after winning the Grand Prize of Bandai Namco Entertainment's tie-in audition "Min'na de Gēmu o Tsukurou: Project LayereD". She joined Mausu Promotion in 2020 after entering their training school in 2018.

In January 2021, it was announced that Shirasu would voice Charlotte Arisaka Anderson, a main character in The Detective Is Already Dead, and the next year she starred as Noma Rune in Immoral Guild and Mio Kofune in Summer Time Rendering. In 2023, she starred as Resna in Atelier Resleriana, Nagisa Amami in the broadcast version of Sazanami Sōshi ni Junketsu o Sasagu, and Toma Asahi in Xicatrice. In March 2024, she was cast as Yoko Shiraki in Time Patrol Bon.

Shirasu's hobbies and special skills include badminton. She speaks Kansai dialect.

== Filmography ==
=== Animated television ===
Year	Title	Role	Ref.
2018	As Miss Beelzebub Likes		
2019	Aikatsu Friends!		
2020	Dropout Idol Fruit Tart		
2020	Lapis Re:Lights		
2021	Build Divide	Rinfu Kanoki	
2021	The Detective Is Already Dead	Charlotte Arisaka Anderson	
2021	Dragon Goes House-Hunting	Tooth fairy	
2021	Otherside Picnic	Student, townsperson	
2022	Bocchi the Rock!		
2022	Idolish7: Third Beat!		
2022	Immoral Guild	Noma Rune	
2022	My Dress-Up Darling		
2022	Orient	Sanae Satsukigawa	
2022	Shadows House		
2022	Shikimori's Not Just a Cutie		
2022	Summer Time Rendering	Mio Kofune	
2022	The Yakuza's Guide to Babysitting		
2022	Yu-Gi-Oh! Go Rush!!		
2023	Ao no Orchestra	Iizuka	
2023	A Playthrough of a Certain Dude's VRMMO Life	Zephana	
2023	Campfire Cooking in Another World with My Absurd Skill	Rusalka	
2023	Chronicles of an Aristocrat Reborn in Another World	Enaku	
2023	Duel Masters Win Duel Wars	Aira	
2023	Fushigi Dagashiya Zenitendō	Natsume Sekinose	
2023	Gunma-chan	Haniwa E	
2023	Sazanami Sōshi ni Junketsu o Sasagu	Nagisa Amami (broadcast version)	
2023	Shimajirō no Wao!	Boy	
2024	Time Patrol Bon	Yoko Shiraki	
2025	Apocalypse Hotel	Yachiyo	
2025	Alma-chan Wants to Be a Family!	Hino	
2026	Ichijyoma Mankitsu Gurashi!	Rie Amamiya	

=== Animated film ===
Year	Title	Role	Ref.
2020	Neko Neko Nihonshi: Ryūma no Hachamecha Time Trouble ze yo!		
2023	Rakudai Majo: Fūka to Yami no Majo	Cecil	

=== Video games ===
Year	Title	Role	Ref.
2017	Layered Stories Zero	Ion Mirna	
2020	Black Star: Theater Starless		
2020	Blade & Soul		
2020	Kowloon High-School Chronicle Origin of Adventure		
2020	Tenka Hyakken: Zan		
2021	Blue Archive	Tsubaki Kasuga	
2021	Demon Slayer: Kimetsu no Yaiba – The Hinokami Chronicles	Town girl	
2021	Umamusume: Pretty Derby	Little Cocon	
2023	Atelier Resleriana	Resna	
2023	Girls' Frontline	MK3A1	
2023	Monster Strike	Ryō Ajimiya, Salem	
2023	Summer Time Rendering: Another Horizon	Mio Kofune	
2023	Xicatrice	Toma Asahi	
2024	Genshin Impact	Sorush	
2026	Path to Nowhere	Helix	
2026	100% Orange Juice	Kurie	
2026	Granblue Fantasy	Luathea	
2027	Romancing SaGa 3: Destinies United	Tatyana	
2027	Honkai: Nexus Anima	Nanafey	
