= Time Patrol Bon =

Japanese manga series

- First tankōbon volume cover

T・Pぼん (Taimu Patorōru Bon)
- Genre: Adventure; Science fiction
- Manga
- Written by: Fujiko Fujio (Note: Hiroshi Fujimoto alone. Fujimoto used the pen name "Fujiko F. Fujio" from 1989 onwards.)
- Published by: Ushio Publishing (former); Chūōkōron-sha (former); Shogakukan
- Magazine: Monthly Shōnen World; Monthly Comic Tom
- Original run: August 1978 – July 1986
- Volumes: 5 (first edition); 3 (later editions)
- Anime television film
- Directed by: Kunihiko Yuyama
- Written by: Shun'ichi Yukimuro
- Music by: Hiroshi Tsutsui
- Studio: Gallop
- Original network: Nippon TV
- Released: October 14, 1989
- Runtime: 94 minutes
- Original net animation

T・P BON
- Directed by: Masahiro Ando
- Produced by: Naoki Amano
- Written by: Yūko Kakihara
- Music by: Michiru Ōshima
- Studio: Bones
- Licensed by: Netflix
- Released: May 2, 2024 – July 17, 2024
- Runtime: 26–31 minutes
- Episodes: 24
- icon

Time Patrol Bon (Japanese: T・Pぼん, Hepburn: Taimu Patorōru Bon) is a Japanese manga series written and illustrated by Fujiko Fujio. It was serialized in Ushio Publishing's Monthly Shōnen World and Monthly Comic Tom from 1978 to 1986. An anime television special, animated by Gallop, was broadcast on Nippon Television in October 1989.

An original net animation (ONA) series, animated by Bones and consisting of two seasons of 12 episodes each, premiered on Netflix in May and July 2024, respectively.

== Plot ==
The story focuses on Bon Namihira, a teenager who becomes part of a team of time-traveling agents tasked with saving people's lives during major historical events that happen across different eras and locations around the globe.

== Characters ==
Bon Namihira (並平 凡, Namihira Bon)
Voiced by: Yūji Mitsuya (1989 special), Akihisa Wakayama (2024 ONA) (Japanese); Griffin Burns (English)
Ream Stream (リーム・ストリーム, Rīmu Sutorīmu)
Voiced by: Rei Sakuma (1989 special), Atsumi Tanezaki (2024 ONA) (Japanese); Erica Lindbeck (English)
Yumiko Yasukawa (安川 ユミ子, Yasukawa Yumiko)
Voiced by: Noriko Hidaka (1989 special), Tomoyo Kurosawa (2024 ONA) (Japanese); Tara Sands (English)
Tetsuo Shiraishi (白石 鉄男, Shiraishi Tetsuo)
Voiced by: Yoko Hikasa (2024 ONA) (Japanese); Ben Diskin (English)
Yanagisawa (柳沢)
Voiced by: Setsuo Itō (2024 ONA) (Japanese); David Errigo Jr. (English)
Buyoyon (ブヨヨン)
Voiced by: Mamoru Miyano (2024 ONA) (Japanese); David Errigo Jr. (English)
Yoko Shiraki (白木 陽子, Shiraki Yōko)
Voiced by: Saho Shirasu (2024 ONA) (Japanese); Erin Yvette (English)
Gayler (ゲイラ, Geira)
Voiced by: Yasuyuki Kase (2024 ONA) (Japanese); Michael Yurchak (English)

== Media ==
=== Manga ===
Written and illustrated by Fujiko Fujio, Time Patrol Bon was serialized in Ushio Publishing's Monthly Shōnen World (first part) and Monthly Comic Tom (second and third part); the first part was serialized from the August 1978 to the September 1979 issues; the second from the May 1980 to the June 1983 issues; and the third from the June 1984 to the July 1986 issues. Ushio Publishing released five tankōbon volumes from September 1979 to August 1985. The manga was re-published by Chūōkōron-sha in five volumes from November 1988 to January 1991, and three volumes in June 1995. Ushio Publishing re-published the series in three volumes from September to November 2008. It was re-published again by Shogakukan in three volumes from September 2011 to March 2012.

=== Anime ===
==== 1989 special ====
An anime television special, animated by Gallop, was broadcast on Nippon TV on October 14, 1989.

==== 2024 ONA ====
In October 2023, it was announced that the manga would be adapted into an original net animation (ONA) series. It is animated by Bones and was streamed for two seasons on Netflix, with the first premiering on May 2, 2024, and the second premiering on July 17 of the same year. The opening theme, "Bon Bon Bon", is performed by Ryan Brahms, while the ending theme, "Tears in the Sky", is performed by Lena Leon.

===== Episodes =====
No.	Title	Original release date
Season 1
1	"I Won't Be Erased!"; Transliteration: "Kesaretr Tamaru ka" (Japanese: 消されてたまるか)	May 2, 2024
2	"T・P Apprentice"; Transliteration: "Minarai T・P" (Japanese: 見ならいT・P)	May 2, 2024
3	"The Secret of the Pyramid"; Transliteration: "Piramiddo no Himitsu" (Japanese: ピラミッドの秘密)	May 2, 2024
4	"An Ancient Man Crosses the Pacific"; Transliteration: "Kodaijin Taiheiyō o Iku" (Japanese: 古代人太平洋を行く)	May 2, 2024
5	"Witch Hunt"; Transliteration: "Majokari" (Japanese: 魔女狩り)	May 2, 2024
6	"The Mountain of the Roaring White Dragon"; Transliteration: "Hakuryū no Hoeru Yama" (Japanese: 白竜のほえる山)	May 2, 2024
7	"The Dark Labyrinth"; Transliteration: "Ankoku no Dai Meikyū" (Japanese: 暗黒の大迷宮)	May 2, 2024
8	"The Beautiful Girl on the Battlefield"; Transliteration: "Senjō no Bishōjo" (Japanese: 戦場の美少女)	May 2, 2024
9	"Riding a Dinosaur on Vacation"; Transliteration: "Bakansu wa Kyōryū ni Notte" (Japanese: バカンスは恐竜に乗って)	May 2, 2024
10	"Gunfight on the O.K. Corral"; Transliteration: "OK Bokujō no Kinjo no Kettō" (Japanese: OK牧場の近所の決闘)	May 2, 2024
11	"The Marathon Battle"; Transliteration: "Maraton Taikai-sen" (Japanese: マラトン大会戦)	May 2, 2024
12	"Hyperspace Castaway"; Transliteration: "Chō Kūkan no Hyōryū-sha" (Japanese: 超空間の漂流者)	May 2, 2024
Season 2
1	"The Random Murders"; Transliteration: "Tōrima Satsujin Jiken" (Japanese: 通り魔殺人事件)	July 17, 2024
2	"The Sacrifice to Chacmool"; Transliteration: "Chaku・Mōru no Ikenie" (Japanese: チャク・モールのいけにえ)	July 17, 2024
3	"The Heike Fugitive"; Transliteration: "Heike no Ochiudo" (Japanese: 平家の落人)	July 17, 2024
4	"The Sumerian Boy"; Transliteration: "Shumēru no Shōnen" (Japanese: シュメールの少年)	July 17, 2024
5	"The First American" (Japanese: 最初のアメリカ人)	July 17, 2024
6	"The T・P Agent's Crime"; Transliteration: "T・P Taiin no Hanzai" (Japanese: T・P隊員の犯罪)	July 17, 2024
7	"The Beast Delb"; Transliteration: "Majū Derubu" (Japanese: 魔獣デルブ)	July 17, 2024
8	"The Day Troy Fell"; Transliteration: "Toroi ga Horobita Hi" (Japanese: トロイが亡びた日)	July 17, 2024
9	"The Grim Reaper's Horde"; Transliteration: "Shinigami no Taigun" (Japanese: 死神の大軍)	July 17, 2024
10	"The Wrath of the Gods"; Transliteration: "Kami no Ikari" (Japanese: 神の怒り)	July 17, 2024
11	"The Ruins Submerged in Rain"; Transliteration: "Ame ni Shizumu Iseki" (Japanese: 雨に沈む遺跡)	July 17, 2024
12	"Time Patrol Bon"; Transliteration: "Taimu Patorōru Bon" (Japanese: タイムパトロールぼん)	July 17, 2024
