= Immoral Guild =

Japanese manga series

- First tankōbon volume cover, featuring Hitamu Kyan

不徳のギルド (Futoku no Girudo)
- Genre: Erotic comedy
- Manga
- Written by: Taichi Kawazoe
- Published by: Square Enix
- English publisher: Square Enix (digital)
- Magazine: Monthly Shōnen Gangan
- Original run: June 12, 2017 – present
- Volumes: 18
- Anime television series
- Directed by: Takuya Asaoka
- Produced by: Takurō Hatakeyama; Satoshi Motonaga; Terushige Yoshie; Noritomo Isogai; Shōta Komatsu
- Written by: Kazuyuki Fudeyasu
- Music by: Ryō Shirasawa
- Studio: TNK
- Licensed by: Sentai Filmworks
- Original network: AT-X (uncensored); Tokyo MX, TVA, KBS Kyoto, SUN, BS11 (censored)
- Original run: October 5, 2022 – December 21, 2022
- Episodes: 12
- icon

Immoral Guild (Japanese: 不徳のギルド, Hepburn: Futoku no Girudo; lit. 'Guild of Depravity') is a Japanese manga series written and illustrated by Taichi Kawazoe. It has been serialized in Square Enix's shōnen manga magazine Monthly Shōnen Gangan since June 2017, with its chapters collected into 18 tankōbon volumes as of September 2026. An anime television series adaptation by TNK aired from October to December 2022.

== Plot ==
Kikuru Madan, the strongest hunter in the Mebuki Town Guild, is worried that he is wasting his youth hunting monsters. He plans on retiring from his current line of work in order to pursue college and relationships, but the guild receptionist, Enome, convinces him to go on a quest with a new martial artist named Hitamu Kyan. However, Hitamu proves to be unskilled in fighting monsters and is attracting them instead with her mana, which causes them to latch onto her in erotic ways. Kikuru decides to put his retirement on hold to train her and the others who join the party so that they can succeed him.

== Characters ==
Kikuru Madan (キクル・マダン)
Voiced by: Katsumi Fukuhara
Kikuru is a 20-year-old hunter. He is described as being an ace hunter within the Mebuki Town Guild, but he is insecure about the fact he has no experience dating women and decides to retire so that he can enroll in college and pursue love. Due to his lack of experience, he is socially awkward in his interactions with women. He uses a bow and arrow to fight, as well as a dagger.
Hitamu Kyan (ヒタム・キャン)
Voiced by: Karin Isobe
Nicknamed "Hitamuki" (ひたむき), Hitamu is a martial artist who has dog ears and a tail. She is a motivated learner who believes in hard work and has a positive and upbeat attitude, despite her tendency to be placed in embarrassing situations with the monsters. Her ability to constantly replenish her mana causes her to be the most frequent target of the monsters, to her dismay. Hitamu has an honest disposition, with a tendency to rush into danger without second thoughts.
Maidena Angers (メイデナ・アンジェ, Meidena Anje)
Voiced by: Ayano Shibuya
Maidena is a white mage prodigy who was hired by the guild due to her extraordinary talent, despite only being a high school student. She acts harsh and arrogant due to her skills and intelligence; however, during combat, she displays a fearful demeanor. She acts coldly towards Kikuru at the beginning, but gradually warms up to him.
Tokishikko Dana (トキシッコ・ダナー, Tokishikko Danā)
Voiced by: Yō Taichi
Tokishikko is a black mage who specializes in powerful damage-dealing magic such as fire, ice and lightning. She has a lazy and carefree personality, and suffers from low motivation. Due to her lack of coordination and precision, her attacks often end up unintentionally backfiring on her party. She is a childhood friend of Hanabata's.
Hanabata Nohkins (ハナバタ・ノーキンス, Hanabata Nōkinsu)
Voiced by: Yuna Kamakura
Hanabata is a warrior. Whenever she uses her Flower Frenzy skill, she enters an intoxicated state with tremendous power and speed. She is a childhood friend of Tokishikko's.
Noma Rune (ノマ・ルーン, Noma Rūn)
Voiced by: Saho Shirasu
Noma is a red mage. Due to his feminine appearance, he is often mistakenly believed to be a girl.
Enome (エノメ)
Voiced by: Rumi Okubo
Enome is the receptionist of Kikuru's guild, whom he has a crush on.
Eshune (エシュネ)
Voiced by: Yuyu Shoji
Eshune is Enome's daughter. She wants her mother and Kikuru to get married so the latter can be her new father.

== Media ==
=== Manga ===
Written and illustrated by Taichi Kawazoe, Immoral Guild began serialization in Square Enix's shōnen manga magazine Monthly Shōnen Gangan on June 12, 2017. As of September 2026, 18 tankōbon volumes have been released. Square Enix is publishing the series digitally in English in the global version of its Manga Up! service.

==== Volumes ====
No.	Japanese release date	Japanese ISBN
1	March 22, 2018	978-4-7575-5623-2
2	July 21, 2018	978-4-7575-5781-9
3	February 22, 2019	978-4-7575-6008-6
4	August 9, 2019	978-4-7575-6234-9
5	February 12, 2020	978-4-7575-6497-8
6	August 11, 2020	978-4-7575-6795-5
7	February 12, 2021	978-4-7575-7088-7
8	August 11, 2021	978-4-7575-7419-9
9	March 11, 2022	978-4-7575-7806-7
10	September 12, 2022	978-4-7575-8132-6
11	March 10, 2023	978-4-7575-8464-8
12	September 12, 2023	978-4-7575-8784-7
13	March 12, 2024	978-4-7575-9094-6
14	September 12, 2024	978-4-7575-9411-1
15	March 12, 2025	978-4-7575-9730-3
16	September 11, 2025	978-4-301-00051-8
17	March 12, 2026	978-4-301-00380-9
18	September 11, 2026	978-4-301-00754-8

=== Anime ===
An anime television series adaptation was announced on March 11, 2022. The series was produced by TNK and directed by Takuya Asaoka, with scripts written by Kazuyuki Fudeyasu, character designs handled by Hiraku Kaneko, and music composed by Ryō Shirasawa. It aired from October 5 to December 21, 2022, on AT-X and other networks. The opening theme song is "Never the Fever!!", performed by Sayaka Sasaki, and the ending theme song is "Sugar Sugar Spice" (シュガー・シュガー・スパイス, Shugā Shugā Supaisu), performed by Minami Kuribayashi. Three DVD and Blu-ray volumes, containing four episodes each, were released between December 23, 2022, and February 22, 2023. Sentai Filmworks licensed the series and streamed all the episodes on Hidive on February 18, 2023.

==== Episodes ====
No.	Title (Note: All English titles are taken from Hidive.)	Directed by	Storyboarded by	Original release date
1	"I'll Do My Best!"; Transliteration: "Hitamuki ni Ganbarimasu!" (Japanese: ひたむきに頑張ります！)	Takuya Asaoka	Takuya Asaoka	October 5, 2022
1	"Her First Step Into a New World"; Transliteration: "Shōjo no Shiranai Sekai" (Japanese: 少女の知らない世界)	Takuya Asaoka	Takuya Asaoka	October 5, 2022
2	"A Bolt from the Blue"; Transliteration: "Seiten no Hekireki" (Japanese: 晴天の霹靂)	Ryō Ōkubo	Yoshiko Saitō	October 12, 2022
2	"Hunter in Peril"; Transliteration: "Hinshi no Kariudo" (Japanese: 瀕死の狩人)	Ryō Ōkubo	Yoshiko Saitō	October 12, 2022
3	"Let's All Hang Out"; Transliteration: "Min'na de Asobō" (Japanese: みんなで遊ぼう)	Takahiko Usui	Katsuhiko Nishijima	October 19, 2022
3	"You're My First"; Transliteration: "Anata ga Hajimete Desu" (Japanese: あなたが初めてです)	Takahiko Usui	Katsuhiko Nishijima	October 19, 2022
4	"Doctor Murder"; Transliteration: "Dokutā Mādā" (Japanese: ドクター・マーダー)	Hodaka Kuramoto	Hodaka Kuramoto	October 26, 2022
4	"White and Black"; Transliteration: "Shiro to Kuro" (Japanese: 白と黒)	Hodaka Kuramoto	Hodaka Kuramoto	October 26, 2022
5	"The Secret of Berserk"; Transliteration: "Kyōka no Himitsu" (Japanese: キョウカのヒミツ)	Masahiko Suzuki	Masahiko Suzuki	November 2, 2022
5	"A Feast of Flesh"; Transliteration: "Niku no Utage" (Japanese: 肉の宴)	Masahiko Suzuki	Masahiko Suzuki	November 2, 2022
6	"Mayday"; Transliteration: "Mēdē" (Japanese: メーデー)	Shin'ya Kawabe	Motohiro Abe	November 9, 2022
6	"A New Family"; Transliteration: "Atarashii Kazoku" (Japanese: 新しい家族)	Shin'ya Kawabe	Motohiro Abe	November 9, 2022
7	"Impossible Game"; Transliteration: "Murigē" (Japanese: ムリゲー)	Taiga Sakakibara	Taiga Sakakibara	November 16, 2022
7	"Mint Ice"; Transliteration: "Minto Aisu" (Japanese: ミントアイス)	Taiga Sakakibara	Taiga Sakakibara	November 16, 2022
8	"Burn It All"; Transliteration: "Kanzen Nenshō" (Japanese: 完全燃焼)	Masahiko Suzuki	Ryō Tanaka & Takuya Asaoka	November 23, 2022
8	"Thank You"; Transliteration: "Arigatō" (Japanese: ありがとう)	Masahiko Suzuki	Ryō Tanaka & Takuya Asaoka	November 23, 2022
9	"The Golden Eggs"; Transliteration: "Kin no Tamago" (Japanese: 金のタマゴ)	Ryō Ōkubo	Katsuhiko Nishijima	November 30, 2022
9	"Something Soft"; Transliteration: "Yawarakai Mono" (Japanese: やわらかいもの)	Ryō Ōkubo	Katsuhiko Nishijima	November 30, 2022
10	"Wavering Feelings"; Transliteration: "Yureru Omoi" (Japanese: 揺れる思い)	Takahiko Usui	Hiroyuki Yamada	December 7, 2022
10	"A Great Father"; Transliteration: "Idai na Chichi" (Japanese: 偉大な父)	Takahiko Usui	Hiroyuki Yamada	December 7, 2022
11	"Passing the Burden"; Transliteration: "Shiwayose wa Hashitte Kuru" (Japanese: しわ寄せは走ってくる)	Hodaka Kuramoto	Yuki Ogawa	December 14, 2022
11	"New World"; Transliteration: "Nyū Wārudo" (Japanese: ニューワールド)	Hodaka Kuramoto	Yuki Ogawa	December 14, 2022
12	"I Don't Want to Come Home Today"; Transliteration: "Kyō wa Kaeritakunai" (Japanese: 今日は帰りたくない)	Ryō Ōkubo	Takuya Asaoka	December 21, 2022
12	"The Little Mystery Solver"; Transliteration: "Nazotoki Ritoru" (Japanese: 謎解きリトル)	Ryō Ōkubo	Takuya Asaoka	December 21, 2022

== Reception ==
By September 2023, the manga had sold over 1.75 million copies. Christopher Farris from Anime News Network gave the anime adaptation a C rating, opining that unless the audience is interested in the fanservice elements, "anything else Immoral Guild has to offer won't really work for you." However, he praised some of the comedic elements, calling it "surprisingly high-effort". He also praised the world-building for its "genuinely unique setup".
