= Nue's Exorcist =

Japanese manga series

- First tankōbon volume cover, featuring Nue (above) and Gakuro (below)

鵺の陰陽師 (Nue no Onmyōji)
- Genre: Comedy; Dark fantasy; Supernatural
- Manga
- Written by: Kōta Kawae
- Published by: Shueisha
- English publisher: NA: Viz Media
- Imprint: Jump Comics
- Magazine: Weekly Shōnen Jump
- Original run: May 15, 2023 – present
- Volumes: 17
- Anime television series
- Directed by: Hiroyuki Hashimoto
- Written by: Hiroshi Seko
- Music by: Monaca
- Studio: Studio Hibari
- Original network: ANN (TV Asahi)
- Original run: Q3 2027 – scheduled
- icon

Nue's Exorcist (Japanese: 鵺の陰陽師, Hepburn: Nue no Onmyōji) is a Japanese manga series written and illustrated by Kōta Kawae. It began serialization in Shueisha's Weekly Shōnen Jump magazine in May 2023. As of November 2026, seventeen tankōbon volumes have been released. An anime television series adaptation produced by Studio Hibari is set to premiere in Q3 2027.

== Plot ==
Ever since he was young, Gakuro Yajima has been able to see spirits, but is timid around them due to one malevolent spirit killing his father. One day, he meets Nue, a powerful spirit in the form of a young woman who lives in a secret room in his high school. After an event with a violent spirit causes Gakuro to be mortally wounded, he makes a contract with Nue where she lends him her power, but only on the condition that he help her vanquish evil spirits and work alongside local exorcists who are wary of her.

== Characters ==
=== Sixth Elimination Squad ===
The squad was created right after Nue revealed her true form, actual name, and the story behind Hyo to the rest of the Captains of the Elimination squads during a meeting. Gakuro Yajima was chosen to lead the squad due to his relationship with Nue, serving as her medium. At first, Nue suggested naming the squad "Origin," but Heiichi quickly rejected the name. Thus, the Sixth Elimination Squad came into existence.

==== Main characters ====
Gakuro Yajima (夜島 学郎, Yajima Gakuro)
Voiced by: Kaito Miura
A first-year student at North High, he was an ordinary, timid boy with nothing remarkable about him—except that he could see spirits. After encountering the mysterious spirit, Nue, and saving his classmate Zenno, he is drawn into the extraordinary world where Spirits and Exorcists collide. He is the captain of 6th Squad and have shadow based ability.
Nue (鵺)
Voiced by: Saori Ōnishi
Gakuro Yajima's partner, she is a spirit that resides at North High. She had been sealed in a room at the school for over 60 years, and it was only when the seal weakened that she happened to encounter Gakuro. Though she appears in the form of a human woman, her true form is believed to be that of a genuine spirit.

==== Combatant ====
Kazusa Suo (周防 七咲, Suo Kazusa)
Voiced by: Sayumi Suzushiro
A senior, known as one of the "Goddesses of North High," and a member of the exorcists gathered in Kagariya City. She recently helped Gakuro establish the Occult Club to deal with the spirits appearing at the school. She is also recognized as the fastest member of the 6th Squad.
Shiroha Fujino (藤乃 代葉, Fujino Shiroha)
An exorcist girl from one of the two powerful old families that wield great influence within the exorcist bureau. She transferred to North High, where Gakuro and Nue are, to help counter the increasing surge of spirits. Highly skilled as an exorcist and was considered as a genius by Nue.
Shitotsu Tomesode (留袖 四衲, Tomesode Shitotsu)
Gakuro's stepsister, separated from him seven years before the events of the series. She resents Gakuro for living an ordinary life instead of becoming an exorcist to avenge their father's death, and she initially declares that she will never obey his orders. However, it is later revealed that she actually cares deeply for him and is willing to do anything to protect him. Physically, she is the strongest member of the team.

==== Supporter ====
Natsuki Kuniruri (国瑠璃 拿月, Kuniruri Natsuki)
The Princess of the Exorcist Bureau and the Divine Child of the Suga Clan. Despite only recently joining North High, she has already become the president of the Disciplinary Committee. She possesses an inexhaustible supply of Command Energy and an extraordinary recovery ability that benefits not only the Sixth Squad but also the entire Exorcist Bureau.
Ishu Aramine (新峰 維朱, Aramine Ishu)
A new transfer student at North High, she is a Level 4 Spirit and the daughter of Hyo Suzaku. She has an intense romantic obsession with Gakuro and even goes as far as pretending to be his fiancée to trick her mother, Suzaku. She often serves as comic relief, frequently crying and trembling whenever a powerful opponent appears.
Reina Machida (町田 莉那, Machida Reina)
A girl from Gakuro's past, she was once saved by him during a swimming lesson and indirectly became the cause of his bullying. She is the reason Gakuro feels awkward around girls in swimsuits and is particularly bothered by being called a "Dirty Boy." A woman of few words, she has harbored feelings for Gakuro since middle school. She is capable of creating barriers.
Makoto Tsujita (辻田 誠乙, Tsujita Makoto)
A middle school girl who harbors feelings for Gakuro. She initially teased him after he accidentally touched her chest, but after Gakuro saved her, she developed a crush on him. As she got to know him better, her feelings gradually grew into genuine love.
Mio Koga (古賀 澪, Koga Mio)
A senior who is a close friend of Kazusa and served as the caretaker of Gakuro and Kazusa during their training. She tends to worry about others and sometimes accidentally says things she shouldn't. Despite being older, she acted like Gakuro's daughter during the summer festival, to the point that Gakuro ended up spoiling her.
Enri Tsukasane (寮子 燕梨, Tsukasane Enri)
A young girl in charge of managing the Sixth Squad's dormitory. She also takes care of Shuna Spider and affectionately refers to Gakuro as "Boss," often going out of her way to make him bento. Together with Shuna Spider, she is capable of teleporting members of the Sixth Squad.

==== Spirits ====
Kyokotsu (狂骨)
A battle-crazed maniac who lives for fighting strong opponents, with his excitement clearly showing whenever he battles someone like Nue or Hakutaku. Despite his wild nature, he is surprisingly caring toward Shiroha, often acting more like an older brother than a fellow fighter. He also places a great deal of trust in Gakuro.
Kathy (キャシー)
A close friend of Nue who often worries about her. She is the one who brings modern gadgets and other things to Nue's room to keep her entertained. She also has a fondness for alcohol. She is capable of locating and accessing otherwise inaccessible paths, allowing Enri and Shuna to use them for teleportation.
Karasu Tengu (鴉天狗)
A spirit whom Gakuro encounters in Mitori Village. She is talkative, cheerful, and caring toward her comrades. However, she also has quite a perverted side and is attracted to both men and women. She isn't shy about indulging her interests, whether it's using her Jutsu to spy on Nue while she's bathing or openly enjoying herself while hiding inside Gakuro's clothes.
Yozora (夜麤卵)
A girl who is the manifestation of the Nue energy accumulated within Gakuro's hollow weapon. She gains a physical form through a new ability, taking the appearance of Nue as a child. As the "daughter" of Yodama and Yokaku, two of Gakuro's abilities, Yozora is essentially Gakuro's "daughter."

=== Exorcists ===
==== First Elimination Squad ====
Yoshiya Sumeragi (皇善哉)
The Captain of First Squad.A gray-haired old man with a scar over his left eye. He is generally quiet and gives off the air of a strong, imposing man, but despite his appearance, he is surprisingly good-natured and gentle when he speaks.
Yamato Rido (吏童大和)
The Vice-Captain of the 1st Squad. A handsome man in his 20s and the ex-boyfriend of Mizuki Ashiya. He takes romance very seriously and is also very fond of Gakuro. However, his beloved Mizuki always comes first, and he would do anything for her, even betray his companions or friends.

==== Second Elimination Squad ====
Komiyako Shimaki (風巻弧宮子)
The Captain of the 2nd Squad. An outgoing woman with a playful and mischievous personality. She enjoys teasing others and rarely takes things too seriously, often carrying herself with a relaxed, confident attitude and a smug smile. She once kissed Gakuro to set an example for Natsuki.

==== Third Elimination Squad ====
Doryo Suga (菅道領)
The Captain of the 3rd Squad. A kind and caring man who genuinely looks out for those around him while always respecting their abilities. However, his personality changes completely when it comes to his niece, Natsuki. He often teases her and tries to hug her despite making her uncomfortable, and can become excessively overprotective of her.

==== Fourth Elimination Squad ====
Heiichi Igari (鶤狩兵一)
The Captain of the 4th Squad. A short, intimidating, and serious woman who takes her duties seriously and carefully considers the consequences of her actions. Despite her stern demeanor, she has a kind heart and is always willing to lend a hand. Around those she trusts, she has a surprisingly carefree and easygoing side, and she is especially fond of her coworkers and subordinates. She was also Takuro's mentee.

==== Fifth Elimination Squad ====
Itsuki Fujino (藤乃慈斬)
The Captain of the 5th Squad. A man who loves children's anime and can be quite talkative. Other than that, he is a man shrouded in mystery.
Yoshichi Kabane (卦羽洋七)
The Vice-Captain of the 5th Squad. A proud man who constantly tries to prove himself, especially to the squad captains, and openly dislikes people like Gakuro, whom he believes never had to struggle for their position. Despite this, he is completely obedient to his captain, Itsuki Fujino. He greatly values the "rules" of the exorcist world.

== Media ==
=== Manga ===
Written and illustrated by Kōta Kawae, the series began serialization in Shueisha's Weekly Shōnen Jump magazine on May 15, 2023. As of September 2026, the series' individual chapters have been collected into sixteen tankōbon volumes.

Viz Media and Manga Plus are publishing the series in English simultaneously with its Japanese release. In February 2024, Viz Media announced that it would publish the series as a digital exclusive, with the first volume being released on June 25, 2024. In October 2024, Viz Media announced a physical release, with the first volume being released on July 1, 2025.

==== Volumes ====
No.	Original release date	Original ISBN	English release date	English ISBN
1	October 4, 2023	978-4-08-883687-4	June 25, 2024 (digital); July 1, 2025 (print)	978-1-9747-4417-6 (digital); 978-1-9747-5615-5 (print)
1. "Portrait View of the Sky" (縦長の空, Tatenaga no Sora); 2. "Gakuro's Big Sister" (学郎の姉, Gakurō no Ane); 3. "Forgetting Beam" (忘れろビーム, Wasurero Bīmu); 4. "Senpai's Soul Gear" (先輩の霊衣, Senpai no Reii); 5. "The Three Goddesses of North High" (北校三天女, Kitakō Santennyo); 6. "The Scent of a Spirit" (幻妖のにおい, Gen'yō no Nioi); 7. "Road of Radiance" (ロードオブレディアント, Rōdo obu Redianto)
2	December 4, 2023	978-4-08-883788-8	September 24, 2024 (digital); September 2, 2025 (print)	978-1-9747-5034-4 (digital); 978-1-9747-5894-4 (print)
8. "Hollow Weapons" (盡器, Jingi); 9. "Provisional Club Enrollment" (オカルト部仮入部, Okaruto-bu Karinyūbu); 10. "Training Begins" (特訓開始, Tokkun Kaishi); 11. "Beach Memories" (海の思い出, Umi no Omoide); 12. "Shiroha's House" (代葉の家, Shiroha no Ie); 13. "Hollow Weapon Release" (盡器の解放, Jingi no Kaihō); 14. "Start of the Duel" (決闘開始, Kettō Kaishi); 15. "Shiroha's Rage" (代葉の怒り, Shiroha no Ikari); 16. "Gakuro's Shadow" (学郎の影, Gakurō no Kage)
3	February 2, 2024	978-4-08-883820-5	November 4, 2025	978-1-9747-5895-1
17. "I Was Afraid" (怖かった, Kowakatta); 18. "Nue and Shiroha" (鵺と代葉, Nue to Shiroha); 19. "Countertactics Against Nue" (鵺対策, Nue Taisaku); 20. "Rengo" (爛匣, Rengō); 21. "About Nue" (鵺について, Nue ni Tsuite); 22. "The Elimination Squad Captains" (討伐隊隊長, Tōbatsu-tai Taichō); 23. "Nue's Candidate" (鵺の推薦, Nue no Suisen); 24. "A Captain's Duty" (隊長の役目, Taichō no Yakume); 25. "The Sixth Branch" (第6支部, Dai-roku Shibu)
4	May 2, 2024	978-4-08-884025-3	January 6, 2026	978-1-9747-6265-1
26. "The Three's Secret" (3人の秘密, San-nin no Himitsu); 27. "Senpai's Honest Feelings" (先輩の本音, Senpai no Honne); 28. "The New Squad Member" (新しい隊員, Atarashii Taiin); 29. "The Siblings' Father" (学郎達の父, Gakurō-tachi no Chichi); 30. "The First Mission" (初任務, Hatsu Ninmu); 31. "Struggles in the Darkness" (黒闇奮闘記, Kuroyami Funtōki); 32. "Is This Really the Time to Be Doing Something Like That?!" (こんな事やってる時間ねーんじゃねーのか!?, Konna Koto Yatteru Jikan Nēn ja Nē no ka!?); 33. "The Village Abnormality" (村の異変, Mura no Ihen); 34. "The Rescue Plan" (救出作戦, Kyūshutsu Sakusen)
5	July 4, 2024	978-4-08-884113-7	March 3, 2026	978-1-9747-6266-8
35. "Shitotsu's Rage" (四衲の怒り, Shitotsu no Ikari); 36. "They Have a Shot at Victory" (勝機は十分にある, Shōki wa Jūbun ni Aru); 37. "Grime Blade" (淤刀, Otō); 38. "I Won't Let You Go" (だめだ行かせない, Dame da Ikasenai); 39. "Gakuro's Selection" (学郎の選択, Gakurō no Sentaku); 40. "Unreliable Older Brother" (頼りない兄, Tayorinai Ani); 41. "Protect Everyone Until the Very End" (必ず守り通します, Kanarazu Mamori Tōshimasu); 42. "I Will Exterminate You" (消滅させてやる, Shōmetsusasete Yaru); 43. "The Captain at Sunset" (夕暮れの隊長, Yūgure no Taichō)
6	September 4, 2024	978-4-08-884171-7	May 5, 2026	978-1-9747-6330-6
44. "Stepsister" (義理の妹, Giri no Imōto); 45. "Please Help Us Level Up!" (めっちゃ成長させてください, Metcha Seichōsasete Kudasai); 46. "Training's Supposed to Be Done Alone" (修行は1人でやるものさ, Shugyū wa Hitori de Yaru Mono sa); 47. "Senpai's Such an Adult" (先輩は大人過ぎる, Senpai wa Otona Sugiru); 48. "Potential" (育て代, Sodate Shiro); 49. "The Ritual Blade" (祭祀刀, Saishitō); 50. "Memento" (形見, Katami); 51. "Birthday and Senpai" (誕生日と先輩, Tanjōbi to Senpai); 52. "Respect" (敬意, Keii)
7	December 4, 2024	978-4-08-884287-5	July 7, 2026	978-1-9747-6460-0
53. "Resolution" (決断, Ketsudan); 54. "Gakuro and Senpai's Battle" (学郎と先輩の戦い, Gakurō to Senpai no Tatakai); 55. "Gakuro Back Then" (あの時の学郎, Ano Toki no Gakurō); 56. "Take a Gamble" (勝負に出ましょう, Shōbu ni Demashō); 57. "The Outcome" (決着, Ketchaku); 58. "Hollow Weapon Release" (盡器解放, Jingi Kaihō); 59. "Two Hollow Weapons" (2つの盡器, Futatsu no Jingi); 60. "Shiroha's Results" (代葉の成果, Shiroha no Seika); 61. "Nue's Ritual Blade" (鵺の祭祀刀, Nue no Saishitō)
8	February 4, 2025	978-4-08-884397-1	September 1, 2026	978-1-9747-6528-7
62. "Raisei" (儡脊); 63. "Limitless Energy" (無尽蔵の令力, Mujinzō no Reiryoku); 64. "Kasha" (火車); 65. "Defeat" (負け, Make); 66. "The Wrap Party" (打ち上げ, Uchiage); 67. "About the Enemy" (敵について, Teki ni Tsuite); 68. "The Vice Captain of the First Branch" (第1支部副隊長, Dai-ichi Shibu Fuku Taichō); 69. "Together" (2人で, Futari de); 70. "Introduction" (紹介, Shōkai)
9	April 4, 2025	978-4-08-884454-1	November 3, 2026	978-1-97-476549-2
71. "As His Big Sister" (お姉ちゃんとして, Onee-chan Toshite); 72. "Greeting" (挨拶, Aisatsu); 73. "Resolve" (覚悟, Kakugo); 74. "Yamato Rido" (吏董大和, Ridō Yamato); 75. "Gakuro's Strength" (学郎の力, Gakurō no Chikara); 76. "Please Stop Fighting" (もう戦わないで, Mō Tatakawanai de); 77. "Confession" (告白, Kokuhaku); 78. "I Hate You" (大嫌い, Daikirai); 79. "I'll Be Back" (行ってきます, Ittekimasu)
10	July 4, 2025	978-4-08-884570-8	—	—
80. "Please Don't Go" (行かんとって下さい, Ikantotte Kudasai); 81. "Invasion" (侵入, Shinnyū); 82. "Tendrils and Arms" (イトとカイナ, Ito to Kaina); 83. "I Won't Forgive You" (許さない, Yurusanai); 84. "Threat" (脅威, Kyōi); 85. "A Guy with No Actual Skill" (実力の無い奴, Jitsuryoku no Nai Yatsu); 86. "A New Mother" (新しい母親, Atarashii Hahaoya); 87. "The Hall of Sins" (科の院, Toga no In); 88. "Operation: Return Route" (帰り道の作戦, Kaerimichi no Sakusen)
11	September 4, 2025	978-4-08-884659-0	—	—
89. "Our Hollow Weapon" (二人の盡器, Futari no Jinki); 90. "Rapid Growth" (急成長, Kyū Seichō); 91. "Love Advice" (恋愛相談, Ren'ai Sōdan); 92. "Transfer Student" (転校生, Tenkō Sei); 93. "Egg" (卵, Tamago); 94. "Family" (家族, Kazoku); 95. "Big Sis" (姉, Ane); 96. "Greeting" (挨拶, Aisatsu); 97. "Greeting (Home Edition)" (挨拶（実家）, Aisatsu （Jikka）)
12	November 4, 2025	978-4-08-884749-8	—	—
98. "The Summer Festival" (夏祭り, Natsumatsuri); 99. "Spring at the Summer Festival" (夏祭りの春, Natsumatsuri no Haru); 100. "Snow and Fireworks" (雪と花火, Yuki to Hanabi); 101. "A Trip" (旅行, Ryokō); 102. "Childrearing" (育児, Ikuji); 103. "Sparring with the Captain" (隊長との手合わせ, Taichō to no Teawase); 104. "A Showdown with Nue" (鵺との対決, Nue to no Taiketsu); 105. "Croquette Roll" (コロッケパン, Korokke Pan); 106. "Wedding Showdown" (決戦結婚式, Kessen Kekkon Shiki)
13	February 4, 2026	978-4-08-884837-2	—	—
107. "A New Battlefield" (新たな戦場, Arata no Senjō); 108. "All Together" (皆で, Mina de); 109. "Tomboy Ishu" (お転婆維朱, Otenba Ishu); 110. "In the Ice" (水の中, Mizu no Naka); 111. "Aurora of Blazing Flame" (紅蓮の極光, Guren no Kyokkō); 112. "MVP" (MVP, Emubuipī); 113. "Pain" (痛み, Itami); 114. "Feathered Ties" (絆の羽, Kizuna no Hane); 115. "An Outrageous Man" (不埒な男, Furachi na Otoko)
14	April 3, 2026	978-4-08-885001-6	—	—
116. “A King-Sized Trial” (特大の試練, Tokudai no Shiren); 117. “A Far Too Outrageous Man” (不埒過ぎる男, Furachi Sugiru Otoko); 118. “Countermeasure” (対抗策, Taikō-saku); 119. “Power of the Contract” (契約の力, Keiyaku no Chikara); 120. “Corruption of Public Morals” (風紀の乱れ, Fūki no Midare); 121. “North High's Second Goddess” (北高三天女２, Kitakō Santen Nyo Ni); 122. “Cheer Battle” (応援合戦, Ōen Gassen); 123. “Soranaki Versus North High” (空亡対北高, Soranaki Tai Kita Kō); 124. “Power Identified” (力の正体, Chikara no Shōtai)
15	June 4, 2026	978-4-08-885099-3	—	—
125. “Nue's Memories” (鵺記憶, Nue no Kioku); 126. “Within Nue” (鵺の中に, Nue no Naka ni); 127. “Soranaki's Heart” (空亡の心, Soranaki no Kokoro); 128. “Soranaki's Island” (空亡の島, Soranaki no Shima); 129. “Reina Machida” (町田莉那, Machida Reina); 130. “In the Heart” (心の中, Kokoro no Naka); 131. “Waterslides” (ウォータースライダー, Wōtāsuraidā); 132. “Hair” (髪, Kami); 133. “Trust” (信頼, Shinrai)
16	September 4, 2026	978-4-08-885181-5	—	—
134. “Resurrection” (復活, Fukkatsu); 135. “The Abyss of Death” (死の淵, Shi no Fuchi); 136. “Moonlit Guidepost” (月明かりの道標, Tsuki Akari no Michishirube); 137. “An Opening!” (隙あり!, Suki Ari!); 138. “Promise” (約束, Yakusoku); 139. “I'm Home” (ただいま, Tadaima); 140. “Hup!” (押忍, Osu); 141. “It'll Be Fine” (大丈夫だ, Daijōbu da); 142. “The Dragon King” (龍王, Ryūō)
17	November 4, 2026	978-4-08-885240-9	—	—
143. "Nue's Contractors" (鵺の契約者達, Nue no Keiyakusha-tachi); 144. “Stagnation at the Root” (根源の淀み, Kongen no Yodomi); 145. “Nue and Tomonaki's Future” (鵺達の未来, Nue-tachi no Mirai); 146. “I'll Surpass You” (貴方を超える, Anata o Koeru); 147. “Nue's Hand” (鵺の手, Nue no Te); 148. “My Own Power” (自らの力で, Mizukara no Chikara de); 149. “The Path You Gave Me” (これた道, Koreta Michi); 150. “I'll Be Back” (行ってきます, Ittekimasu); 151. “A Shot at Victory” (勝算, Shōsan)

==== Chapters not yet in tankōbon format ====
These chapters have yet to be published in a tankōbon volume.

152. “Three Captains” (３人の隊長, San'nin no Taichō)
153. “I've Got It” (任せろ, Makasero)
154. “In That Case, We Were Right” (だったら僕らは正しい, Dattara Bokura wa Tadashī)
155. “Family Ties” (家族の絆, Kazoku no Kizuna)
156. “Anger” (いかり, Ikari)
157. “Enemy” (敵, Kataki)
158. “Is There A Girl You Like?” (好きな子はいるか?, Sukina Ko wa iru ka?)
159. “The Sixth Branch” (第6支部, Dai 6 Shibu)
160. “As A Senpai” (先輩として, Senpai Toshite)
161. “Time to Bloom” (咲く時, Saku Toki)
162. “Trump Card” (奥の手, Oku no Te)
163. “Alone” (１人, Hitori)

=== Anime ===
An anime television series adaptation was announced on October 12, 2026. It will be produced by Studio Hibari and directed by Hiroyuki Hashimoto, with series composition handled by Hiroshi Seko, characters designed by Shunpei Mochizuki, and music composed by Monaca. The series is set to premiere in Q3 2027 on TV Asahi and its affiliates.

=== Other media ===
A café collaboration with Nue's Exorcist at Bandai Namco Cross Store Tokyo was announced on May 27, 2024. The café booth was held from July 4 to August 4, 2024.

The series also received two pop-up stores, the first store being at AKIHABARA Gamers Main Store in Tokyo from August 16, 2025, to August 31, 2025. The second store was at Abeno Raku Bus in Osaka, and it ran from August 30, 2025, September 7, 2025.

Due to the success of the pop-up store, additional pop-up stores hosted by Crux were held under the name "Nue's Geeky Tour." The first store took place at Kobe Marui from November 21 to November 30, 2025. The second store was held at Tokyo Marui and ran from December 25, 2025, to January 5, 2026. A Pop-Up Store and Gallery was held by the SUKI+PLUS brand of DeNA, and ran from July 3 to July 12, 2026, on their Tokyo store, and July 24 to August 2, 2026 (Sun) in their online store. Online sales lasted until August 31, 2026.

On November 3, 2025, Shueisha released a web browser visual novel game titled Nue's Exorcist: Summer◇Memories. It was fully voiced and used to promote the release of Volume 12.

== Reception ==
The series was ranked eleventh in the Nationwide Bookstores Employees' Recommended Comics of 2024 list. The series ranked seventh in the print category at the tenth Next Manga Awards in 2024. The series topped AnimeJapan's "Manga We Want to See Animated" poll in 2025.

Popular authors such as Ryōgo Narita of Durarara!!, Yuuichirou Higashide of Fate/Apocrypha and Tappei Nagatsuki of Re:Zero have praised the series on social media even Kinoko Nasu best known for making iconic stories like The Garden of Sinners,Fate/Stay Night and Witch on the Holy Night is a big fan of the series. Manga artists such as Yukinobu Tatsu of Dandadan , Takuma Yokota of Destroy All Humans. They Can't Be Regenerated. and Shiro Usazaki of Ichi the Witch fame have created fanart of the series.

Jonathan Greenall of Comic Book Resources praised the story, artwork, and characters, as well as the character's designs. Rowan Grover of Multiversity Comics liked the artwork, though he criticized the humor and fan service, ultimately describing it as "forgettable to annoying".

By July 2025, the series had over 1.2 million copies in circulation. By October 2026, it had over 1.6 million copies in circulation.
