= Ghost Fixers =

Japanese manga series

- First tankōbon volume cover

ゴーストフィクサーズ (Gōsuto Fikusāzu)
- Genre: Science fiction
- Manga
- Written by: Yasuki Tanaka
- Published by: Shueisha
- Imprint: Jump Comics+
- Magazine: Shōnen Jump+
- Original run: March 22, 2024 – October 16, 2026
- Volumes: 7

Ghost Fixers (Japanese: ゴーストフィクサーズ, Hepburn: Gōsuto Fikusāzu) is a Japanese manga series written and illustrated by Yasuki Tanaka. It was serialized on Shueisha's Shōnen Jump+ web service from March 2024 to October 2026, and has been compiled into seven tankōbon volumes as of March 2026.

== Plot ==
The series is set in 2034 in the fictional place of Mikurigaoka New Town. Seven years prior, a phenomenon called Fafrotskies resulted in objects falling from the sky, as well as strange supernatural beings dubbed "Ghosts". Hifumi Kagome, a middle school boy, investigates and fights the ghosts, along with Moka Kirarazaka, a new arrival to Mikurigaoka New Town.

== Characters ==
Hifumi Kagome (籠目 ひふみ, Kagome Hifumi)
A second-year middle schooler. Although he initially did not get along with Moka, he learns to trust her after they fight against the Ghosts together. His Primary Gear, Iron Body, allows him to harden his body like steel, and his secondary gear, The Cut-All Blade, is a toy katana that can cut through anything, but only once. Afterwords, it has to be resheathed.
Moka Kirarazaka (雲母坂 最果, Kirarazaka Moka)
A second-year middle schooler who recently moved to Mikurigaoka New Town. She has a rough personality, which caused tension with Hifumi after they initially met. Her Primary Gear, Ghost Shift, allows her to become intangible, and her secondary gear, Gargantuan Stomach, is a special suitcase with infinite storage space inside.

== Publication ==
The series is written and illustrated by Yasuki Tanaka. It was serialized on Shueisha's Shōnen Jump+ web service from March 22, 2024, to October 16, 2026. The first tankōbon volume was released on June 4, 2024; seven volumes have been published as of March 2026. The series is also published in English on the Manga Plus service.

No.	Release date	ISBN
1	June 4, 2024	978-4-08-884080-2
2	September 4, 2024	978-4-08-884191-5
3	December 4, 2024	978-4-08-884382-7
4	March 4, 2025	978-4-08-884477-0
5	July 4, 2025	978-4-08-884582-1
6	November 4, 2025	978-4-08-884762-7
7	March 4, 2026	978-4-08-884892-1
8	December 4, 2026	978-4-08-885369-7

== Reception ==
The series was ranked tenth in the 2025 Next Manga Award in the web manga category.

== See also ==
- Summer Time Rendering, another manga series by Yasuki Tanaka
