= Attack on Titan: Lost Girls =

Japanese novel written by Hiroshi Seko

- The cover of the novel as published in Japan

進撃の巨人 LOST GIRLS (Shingeki no Kyojin: Rosuto Gāruzu)
- Video game

Lost in the Cruel World
- Developer: Nitroplus
- Designed by: Seko
- Genre: Visual novel
- Released: September 18, 2013
- Video game

Wall Sina, Goodbye
- Developer: Nitroplus
- Designed by: Seko
- Genre: Visual novel
- Released: December 18, 2013
- Novel
- Written by: Hiroshi Seko
- Published by: Kodansha
- English publisher: NA: Vertical
- Imprint: Kodansha Comics Deluxe
- Published: December 9, 2014
- Manga
- Written by: Ryōsuke Fuji
- Published by: Kodansha
- English publisher: NA: Kodansha Comics
- Magazine: Bessatsu Shōnen Magazine
- Original run: August 9, 2015 – May 9, 2016
- Volumes: 2
- Original animation DVD
- Directed by: Masashi Koizuka
- Produced by: Tetsuya Kinoshita; Kensuke Tateishi
- Written by: Hiroshi Seko
- Music by: Hiroyuki Sawano
- Studio: Wit Studio
- Licensed by: NA: Kodansha Comics
- Released: December 8, 2017 – August 9, 2018
- Runtime: 25 minutes
- Episodes: 3
- icon

Attack on Titan: Lost Girls (進撃の巨人 LOST GIRLS, Shingeki no Kyojin: Rosuto Gāruzu) is a Japanese novel written by Hiroshi Seko. The book is a spin-off of the manga series Attack on Titan by Hajime Isayama. A manga adaptation began serialization in August 2015 and ran until May 2016. A three-part original animation DVD adaptation was released on December 8, 2017, April 9, 2018, and August 9, 2018, with the 24th, 25th, and 26th limited edition volumes of the original manga, respectively.

== Plot ==
The stories are about two female characters in the series: Mikasa Ackerman and Annie Leonhart. "Lost in the cruel world" is about Mikasa and her relationship with Eren, featuring a vision in an alternative universe where her parents weren't murdered. "Wall Sina, Goodbye" is about Annie and her life as a member of the Military Police Brigade in the time before she attempts to capture Eren on a Survey Corps reconnaissance mission. "Lost Girls" is about their interaction during training and the reconnaissance mission.

== Media ==
=== Novel ===
The novel is based on two mini-visual novels from Nitroplus, which were included with the third and sixth volumes of the Attack on Titan anime Blu-ray release. The first, Lost in the Cruel World, was written by Seko and released on September 18, 2013. The second, titled Wall Sina, Goodbye, also by Seko, was released on December 18, 2013.

The novel is written by Hiroshi Seko, who worked as a scriptwriter for the anime. Kodansha published it in December 2014 under their Kodansha Comics Deluxe imprint. It consists of three short stories, titled "Lost in the cruel world", "Wall Sina, Goodbye", and "Lost Girls".

North American publisher Vertical announced their license to the novel at Anime Expo 2015 and released it on June 28, 2016.

No.	Original release date	Original ISBN	English release date	English ISBN
1	December 9, 2014	978-4-06-377096-4	June 28, 2016	978-1-942993-35-3
1. "Lost in the cruel world" 2. "Wall Sina, Goodbye"; 3. "Lost Girls"

=== Manga ===
A manga adaptation by Ryōsuke Fuji began serialization in Kodansha's magazine Bessatsu Shōnen Magazine on August 9, 2015. The series ended in the June 2016 issue of the magazine on May 9, 2016. Kodansha compiled it in two volumes in 2016.

In March 2016, Kodansha Comics announced that they had licensed the series, and they released it in English in 2016 and 2017.

==== Volumes ====
No.	Original release date	Original ISBN	English release date	English ISBN
1	April 8, 2016	978-4-06-395638-2	August 30, 2016	978-1-63236-385-5
Chapter 1: Wall Sina, Goodbye.: 1. "Carly Stratmann" (カーリー・ストラットマン, Kārī Sutorattoman); 2. "Wayne Eisner" (ウェイン・アイズナー, Wein Aizunā); 3. "Wald & Lou" (ウオルド&ルー, Uorudo & Rū); 4. "Coderoin" (コデロイン, Koderoin); 5. "Annie Leonhart" (アニ・レオンハート, Ani Reonhāto)
2	August 9, 2016	978-4-06-395722-8	February 28, 2017	978-1-63236-418-0
Chapter 2: Lost in the Cruel World.: 1. "Eren Yeager" (エレン・イェーガー, Eren Iēgā); 2. "Shiganshina" (シガンシナ, Shiganshina); 3. "Airplane" (ひこうき, Hikōki); 4. "Mirror Man" (鏡男, Kagami Otoko); Chapter 3: Lost Girls

=== Anime ===
The anime adaptation was released as three-part original animation DVD, along with the 24th, 25th, and 26th limited edition volumes of the original Attack on Titan manga, respectively. On December 15, 2021, it was announced that Attack on Titan's eight OADs would be released subtitled by Funimation and Crunchyroll on December 19, with the dubbed release following in 2022. On May 2, 2022, it was announced that the dub will be released weekly starting on May 8, 2022. The Lost Girls OADs were released from June 12 to 26.

==== Episodes ====
No. overall	No. in series	Title	Original release date	English release date
16.5A	1	"Wall Sina, Goodbye: Part One"	December 9, 2017	December 19, 2021 (subtitled); June 12, 2022 (dubbed)
At Stohess District Military Police base, Annie tells her roommate that she needs a day off. In return she agrees to help to do her roommate's assignment, find Carly Stratmann who is missing. Annie visits Carly's father, who appears to know very little about his daughter, but Annie suspects that he is withholding information. Stratmann owns the Marleen Company which used to trade between Wall Maria and Wall Sina, but now the company is on the brink of collapse although he appears wealthy. Annie traces Carly to the Pit Riddles bar where Carly appears to be a regular, with more money than she should have. There, Annie physically extracts information about Carly's boyfriend Kampfer Boltz from some regular customers. She investigates his accommodation, finding a large quantity of the illicit drug Codeloine and a body under the bed.
16.5B	2	"Wall Sina, Goodbye: Part Two"	April 9, 2018	December 19, 2021 (subtitled); June 19, 2022 (dubbed)
Annie confirms the body she found in the apartment is that of Kampfer Boltz, which places her in a difficult position since as a Military Police officer, she has to report the body. As she leaves, she is intercepted by two other investigators, Wald and his assistant Lou. They prepare to dispose of her, but she tricks Lou into triggering her Titan form, however when she returns to normal, Lou shoots both her and Wald. Annie recovers from the fatal shot and the wounded Wald reveals that Stratmann had also hired him to find Carly, and Stratmann knows all about her secret life. Before he dies, Wald tells Annie that Kampfer offered to hire them to blackmail Stratmann about his daughter's situation and demand a ransom for her return. Annie tracks down Lou, finds Carly and then discovers that she and her father are involved in manufacturing and distributing Codeloine. To cover her own involvement, Annie eventually arranges passage for Carly escape to Wall Rose and help her father by dumping Kemper's body. Annie's next task is to infiltrate the Survey Corps' 57th reconnaissance mission and capture Eren Jaeger.
???	3	"Lost in the Cruel World"	August 9, 2018	December 19, 2021 (subtitled); June 26, 2022 (dubbed)
At Wall Rose, Mikasa experiences an alternate vision of her early family life where her parents were not killed. She meets Eren, the son of Doctor Jaeger. Walking together in the woods, she and Eren encounter wolves eating the bodies of the would-be kidnappers, but when Eren approaches them, the wolves retreat. The two children gradually become friends and Eren tells Mikasa about his friend Armin and his dreams of joining the Survey Corps and visiting the outside world beyond the wall. Although she likes him, Eren is only fixated on his dreams, even after seeing Survey Corps casualties caused by encounters with Titans and injures he suffers fighting to defend their reputation. When Eren tells Mikasa that he and Armin plan to "jump" the wall in a hot air balloon she wants to go with them. However at the appointed time, she is held back by a masked "man of the mirror" masquerading as a magician, who says he will turn her into a killer and tells her that she cannot avoid Eren's death. Mikasa appears to kill the man, but it is revealed to be a magic trick done by the man, and she continues to the meeting place. Mikasa eventually finds Armin, who tells her that Eren sacrificed himself to save Armin when the hot air balloon crashed. Back in the present, Mikasa realizes that Eren will follow his destiny and that she will be by his side.

== Reception ==
Volume one of the manga reached fifteenth place on the weekly Oricon comic rankings, and sold a total of 80,619 copies.

== See also ==
- Shangri-La Frontier: the manga adaptation of which is illustrated by Ryōsuke Fuji
