= Katsumi Fukuhara =

Japanese voice actor

- 福原 かつみ
- Born: 24 August
- Occupation: Voice actor
- Years active: 2015–present
- Employer: Axl-One
- Notable work: In Another World with My Smartphone as Touya Mochizuki; W'z as Yukiya Araki; Immoral Guild as Kikuru Madan

Katsumi Fukuhara (Japanese: 福原 かつみ, Hepburn: Fukuhara Katsumi; born 24 August) is a Japanese voice actor from Ibaraki Prefecture, affiliated with Axl-One. He is known for voicing Touya Mochizuki in In Another World with My Smartphone, Yukiya Araki in W'z, and Kikuru Madan in Immoral Guild. He won the Seiyu Award for Best Rookie Actor in 2020.

== Biography ==
Katsumi Fukuhara, a native of Ibaraki Prefecture, was born on 24 August. His voice acting career started in 2015, appearing in the film Miss Hokusai and the video game Natsuiro High School: Seishun Hakusho. Educated at the training school Axl-Zero, he joined Axl-One in April 2016.

In May 2017, Fukuhara was cast as Touya Mochizuki, the main character of In Another World with My Smartphone. In March 2018, he was cast as Yukiya Araki, the main character of W'z. In April 2019, he was cast as Anthony in If It's for My Daughter, I'd Even Defeat a Demon Lord.

In March 2020, Fukuhara won the Seiyu Award for Best Rookie Actor at the 14th Seiyu Awards. In September 2020, he was cast as Hokuto Kurama in Scar on the Praeter and as Shark in Crunchyroll's adaptation of the manhwa Noblesse. In March 2021, he was cast as Toma Sobi in 86. In June 2022, he was cast as Kikuru Madan, the main character of Immoral Guild. In December 2023, he was cast as Kyle Morgan Crevary in 7th Time Loop.

In tokusatsu, he has voiced the Denpa Monster Reclaimer in Ultraman Taiga (2019) and the STORAGE AI in Ultraman Z (2020), as well as serving as the narrator of Ultraman Chronicle Z: Heroes' Odyssey (2021).

== Filmography ==
=== Animated television ===
2016

- Dream Festival!, classmate
- Puzzle & Dragons, dragon man

2017

- Alice & Zoroku, subordinate
- Anonymous Noise, youth
- Atom: The Beginning, onlooker
- Fox Spirit Matchmaker, Sekisakan, black demon fox
- In Another World with My Smartphone, Touya Mochizuki
- Masamune-kun's Revenge, student
- Sengoku Night Blood, soldier, vassal
- The Silver Guardian, zombie

2018

- Back Street Girls, fan
- Banana Fish, Sonny
- Cute High Earth Defense Club HAPPY KISS!, student
- Hug! Pretty Cure, Fumito Chise
- Iroduku: The World in Colors, male student
- Kiratto Pri Chan, staff
- Persona 5: The Animation, SP
- Hitori no Shita: The Outcast 2, Zhang Cai

2019

- Ace of Diamond Act II, Kengo Kawashima
- Hi Score Girl II, gamer
- High School Prodigies Have It Easy Even in Another World, Mash
- If It's for My Daughter, I'd Even Defeat a Demon Lord, Anthony
- Mayonaka no Boitore Danshi, Ōkaku Shinku
- We Never Learn, spectator B
- Wise Man's Grandchild, Knight Training Officer Academy student
- W'z, Yukiya Araki

2020

- A Certain Scientific Railgun, rival schoolboy
- Ahiru no Sora, Daiei member
- Black Clover, boy
- Case Closed, youth
- Darwin's Game, Ace member
- Higurashi When They Cry: Gou, Kōichi Kameda
- Noblesse, Shark

2021

- 86, Toma Sobi
- Amaim Warrior at the Borderline, Immovable Atsushi
- Demon Slayer: Kimetsu no Yaiba
- Super Cub, male student
- The Aquatope on White Sand, groom
- The Duke of Death and His Maid, youth
- The Vampire Dies in No Time, ghoul
- Charisma House, Iori Motohashi

2022

- Eternal Boys, Oda
- Is It Wrong to Try to Pick Up Girls in a Dungeon?, Turk's friends
- Orient, student
- Pop Team Epic, streamer, Yankee A
- Scar on the Praeter, Hokuto Kurama
- The Eminence in Shadow
- The Little Lies We All Tell

2023

- Cap Kakumei Bottleman DX, Goemon Ōi
- Cardfight!! Vanguard will+Dress, Tirnanog Youth member
- Immoral Guild, Kikuru Madan
- In/Spectre, Ryoma (reminiscence)
- Sacrificial Princess and the King of Beasts, soldier B
- Shy, passenger
- Skip and Loafer, Hashimoto
- The Angel Next Door Spoils Me Rotten, male student
- The Legend of Heroes: Trails of Cold Steel – Northern War
- The Yuzuki Family's Four Sons, student

2024

- 7th Time Loop, Kyle Morgan Crevary
- Love Is Indivisible by Twins, Toyoshige Moriwaki

2025

- Li'l Miss Vampire Can't Suck Right, Daichi Chiba

=== Animated film ===
2015

- Miss Hokusai

2017

- Black Butler: Book of the Atlantic
- Haikyu!! Sainō to Sense, first-year student

2019

- Weathering with You

2020

- Marudase Kintarō, Kijitani

2021

- Sing a Bit of Harmony

2022

- Suzume

2023

- Crayon Shin-chan Movie 31: Chounouryoku Daikessen - Tobe Tobe Temakizushi

=== Original net animation ===
2018

- B – The Beginning, Richard, Red, others

2019

- Gundam Build Divers Re:Rise, male G-CAFÉ customer

2020

- Cap Kakumei Bottleman, Goemon Ōi
- Zenonzard the Animation, youth

2021

- Beyblade Burst QuadDrive, Basara Suiryū
- Teach Me, Hokusai!, executive committee member, guest

2022

- The Missing 8, Rock

=== Tokusatsu ===
- Ultraman Taiga (2019), Denpa Monster Reclaimer (voice)
- Ultraman Z (2020), STORAGE AI (voice)
- Ultraman Chronicle Z: Heroes' Odyssey (2021), narration

=== Video games ===
2015

- Natsuiro High School: Seishun Hakusho

2016

- Gyakuten Othellonia, Almaguera
- White Cat Project, Roppenial

2018

- Naruto to Boruto: Shinobi Striker, Avatar Ninja

2020

- The Legend of Heroes: Trails into Reverie, Chanhoi

2021

- Eclipse Saga, Faust

2022

- Code Geass Lelouch of the Rebellion Lost Stories, Thomas Kimmel

2023

- Master Detective Archives: Rain Code, Yuma Kokohead
- Monster Strike, Tōgenkyō

== Awards ==
| Year | Award | Result | Ref. |
|---|---|---|---|
| 2020 | Seiyu Award for Best Rookie Actor | Won | |
