= W'z =

Japanese anime television series

- Key visual
- Created by: GoHands; Frontier Works
- Anime television series
- Directed by: Shingo Suzuki; Hiromitsu Kanazawa
- Produced by: Kazuhiko Hasegawa; Mitsuhiro Ogata; Fuminori Yamazaki; Hiroshi Kamei; Toshiyasu Hayashi; Tetsuya Kakita; Yoshinori Hasegawa; Kouhei Nagaoka
- Written by: GoHands (Note: Series composition); Tamazō Yanagi (Note: Screenplay)
- Music by: FABTONE; GOON TRAX
- Studio: GoHands
- Licensed by: NA: Sentai Filmworks
- Original network: MBS, Tokyo MX, TVQ, BS11
- Original run: January 5, 2019 – March 30, 2019
- Episodes: 13 + OVA

W'z is a 2019 anime television series produced by Frontier Works and animated by GoHands. A sequel of Hand Shakers, it aired from January 5 to March 30, 2019. The series stars Katsumi Fukuhara in the lead role, and features music by various EDM artists. From April 10 to 14, a live-action theatre stage was held in Tokyo.

== Plot ==
Shortly after the events of Hand Shakers, Tazuna, Koyori, Mayumi, and Nagaoka finally meet God, and their wish was later granted. However, they later disappear without a trace. This also results in Koyori losing her power. Tazuna decides to never stop searching for them.

Ten years later, Yukiya Araki – an irregular Hand Shaker – is introduced. Trying to become a DJ, Yukiya tries to avoid holding hands with other people, lest he turns them into Hand Shakers like him. One night, while trying to get more views for his music videos, Yukiya brings his friend Haruka into the Ziggurat, the alternate dimension that hosts battles for all Hand Shakers. Unfortunately, this brings the attention of other Hand Shakers, who want to defeat Yukiya and take his power.

== Characters ==
Yukiya Araki
Voiced by: Katsumi Fukuhara
The protagonist of the series. Yukiya has been instructed never to hold hands with anyone and he has tried to live a normal life, away from the Hand Shaker fights. He is a new kind of Hand Shaker called the irregular Hand Shaker. He wants to become a DJ and attempts to get more views for his music video by entering the Ziggurat and bringing his friend Haruka along. Unfortunately, this earns him some unwanted attention from other Hand Shakers and he is forced to defend Haruka from them. It was assumed that his irregularity was due to the fact of him being born and raised inside of the Ziggurat dimension. Former Hand Shakers, Reijiro & Yukine adopts him after being confronted by a mysterious couple. In the finale, Yukiya learns Nagaoka and Mayumi are his biological parents, who used their wish to God to conceive Yukiya inside the Ziggurat.
Midori Okuike
Voiced by: Toshiki Masuda
Midori is an heir of a prestigious company. He is a Hand Shaker, and his partner is his butler, Seba. He serves as the primary antagonist of the series, wishing to challenge Yukiya to obtain his powers. Back when he was a child, Midori wanted to help his father's company, so he wished to God for the ability to bring precious metals from the Ziggurat into the real world by tearing his own flesh. Although the Okuike Group prospered, Midori fell ill, as the ability to harvest metals in his body was starting to kill him. Midori's father still attempted to extract the metals from Midori's body until Seba killed him and rescued Midori. In the finale, Yukiya uses a wish to God to heal Midori and give him a chance for a normal life. With his body healthy, Midori chooses to call off his search for Yukiya.
Seba Suchan
Voiced by: Shunsuke Takeuchi
Seba Suchan is Midori's butler and Hand Shaker partner. His life before becoming Midori's partner is unknown, but Reijiro Araki says Seba is too rough to be a butler. Seba initially supported Midori's desire to help the Okuike group until he saw that Midori's father had been consumed by greed and began extracting the metals from Midori's body, risking his son's life in the process. To save Midori, Seba killed the elder Okuike and his associates. Since then, he has supported Midori's plans.
Gai Kishiwada
Voiced by: Takuya Eguchi
Gai Kishiwada is a stargazing enthusiast. Amazed by Yukiya's irregularity, he wishes to obtain his power to be able to live inside of Ziggurat. He is a Hand Shaker, paired with his friend Masataka. His Hand Shaker name is Rigel Pile. After being defeated Yukiya and Masarou Houjou, Gai agrees to help Yukiya's friends stop Midori.
Masataka Sakai
Voiced by: Yoshinosuke Yamagami, Misato Murai (childhood)
Masataka Sakai, is Gai's stargazing friend. He is a calm person who wishes to obtain Yukiya's power, in order to live inside Ziggurat. Masataka is Gai's Hand Shakers partner, bearing the name Betelgeuse Pile. After being defeated Yukiya and Masarou Houjou, Gai agrees to help Yukiya's friends stop Midori.
Fumiyuki
Voiced by: Daisuke Namikawa
Reijirō
Voiced by: Jun Fukuyama
Reijiro, also known as Reijiro Araki, is the adoptive father of Yukiya. He is a former Hand Shaker under the Hand Shakers team Chain and was paired with his wife, Yukine. His former Hand Shakers name was known as Break. Despite being hot headed, Reijiro is a caring and kind man. He wishes to raise Yukiya normally, making sure that he won't be burdened by his fate as an irregular Hand Shaker.
Haruka
Voiced by: Akane Fujita
Haruka, also known as Haruka Tosabori, is Yukiya's childhood friend. She attempts to help Yukiya with his music video and accepts his invitation into the Ziggurat, unaware he is a Hand Shaker. However, upon entering the Ziggurat, Haruka receives a strange vision.
Senri
Voiced by: Inori Minase
Senri is a bubbly girl who is Hana's girlfriend. She is a Hand Shaker, paired with Hana. Together, the duo becomes Team Connect. Senri is fond of her girlfriend, hoping to be able to hold hands with her without initiating the Ziggurat dimension.
Hana
Voiced by: Atsumi Tanezaki
Hana is a mature & goal-driven girl. She's Senri's girlfriend, and is her Hand Shakers partner. Together with Senri, the duo forms the Hand Shaker's team, Connect. Similar to Senri, Hana hopes to be able to hold hands with her girlfriend without initiating the Ziggurat dimension.
Tamari
Voiced by: Minami Takahashi
Tamari is a clothes store owner.
Yukine
Voiced by: Yōko Hikasa
Yukine, also known as Yukine Araki, is the adoptive mother of Yukiya. She is a former Hand Shaker under the team name Chain and was paired with her husband, Reijiro. Her former Hand Shakers name was Bind.

== Anime ==
The series aired from January 5 to March 30, 2019, on MBS, Tokyo MX, TVQ, and BS11. GOON TRAX will produce the series' music. Ryōhei Takenaka will perform the series' opening theme, while Fuki will perform the series' ending theme. The series ran for 13 episodes. W'z is a sequel to Hand Shakers.

No.	Title	Original release date
1	"Eye's Y's Shout"	January 5, 2019
Yukiya grows up with his father's instruction: to never let his hands touch with anyone. Doing so will only cause misfortune. 14 year old Yukiya Araki is an enthusiastic growing DJ using the pseudonym W'z. Concerned with the lack of viewers, he accepted the idea of his childhood friend, Haruka Tosaburi, to shoot a promotional video for his music. However by doing so, he must hold hands with her. Yukiya is an irregular Hand Shaker – just a touch on one's hand will be enough to enter a different dimension, the Ziggurat. In the late evening, Yukiya & Haruka enter Ziggurat & begin their live music streaming. While streaming & recording for his music video, Yukiya was confronted with a group of Hand Shakers who were interested with his ability.
2	"ShE SaW Soul"	January 12, 2019
Team Connect, Hana and Senri, as well as Team Pile, Gai and Masataka, are fighting against a single Hand Shaker, Yukiya. After successfully creating a diversion for him to flee, Yukiya brings Haruka back into the real world. Fortunately, Haruka was unable to remember anything during the Hand Shakers spar. On the next day, both Yukiya & Haruka attends Kita Asuka Academy open fair. Yukiya was told to meet with a person named Dr. Akutagawa by his father's acquaintance on the day prior. Heading to the research facility where the Doctor works, Yukiya and Haruka found out that the room was empty. Yukiya opens a door leading to an observation room. There he meets Dr. Koyori Akutagawa, a former Hand Shaker. Koyori requests for Yukiya to look for her elder sister altogether with her sister's Hand Shakers partner. Koyori also advises Yukiya to be careful, as due to the live stream, several group of Hand Shakers are now targeting him in order to obtain his power. As he arrives home, Yukiya's father, Reijiro, demands an explanation from him after knowing what has happened.
3	"Café CUP PUCk"	January 19, 2019
After considering the risk put onto him, Yukiya decides to delete the music video he shoot inside Ziggurat. The next day during school time, Yukiya begs Haruka to have a discussion with him, making her flustered. Hanging out at their favorite restaurant, Yukiya stated his concerns and informs that he have deleted the video. However, the video went viral & was spreading on the internet. On the same time, at a small calming cafe, a group of former Hand Shakers are gathering.
4	"FOuR FOR FORce"	January 26, 2019
5	"Turn Time gear"	February 2, 2019
6	"Cherry lily Cam"	February 9, 2019
7	"Get back boys"	February 16, 2019
8	"NO kNOw Noise"	February 23, 2019
9	"GReen GROss GROOvy"	March 2, 2019
10	"DUDDY bUDDY riDe"	March 9, 2019
11	"CHurch CHat Chat"	March 16, 2019
12	"Hi HOO HOOligan"	March 23, 2019
13	"My wish is surely"	March 30, 2019
