= Xicatrice =

- Developer: Nippon Ichi Software
- Publisher: Nippon Ichi Software
- Platforms: Nintendo Switch; PlayStation 4; PlayStation 5
- Release: JP: June 29, 2023
- Genre: Role-playing
- Mode: Single-player

Xicatrice is a Japanese role-playing video game developed and published by Nippon Ichi Software. It was released on June 29, 2023 for the Nintendo Switch, PlayStation 4, and PlayStation 5 platforms. No announcements on an English language release have been made.

== Story ==
The game takes place in an alternate history where, one hundred years prior to the present, humanity began developing various superpowers, that were used to both better and hurt society. To help control and deter the negative effects, a special forces enforcement group, "Anti Abnormal Unusual Talent Team" (AUT) was created. The game takes place in modern Japan and follows Renshi Kamiya, a special forces AUT member turned teacher after an incident in his past caused him to lose his superpowers. He joins a secondary group - "Reserve Anti Unusual Talent Team" (RAUT) - a group that watches over and trains students struggling to control their own developing superpowers.

Kamiya's class consists of seven core students: Haruki Suzuhira, who is enthusiastic but sometimes crumbles under pressure, Yuichi Kamishiro, who is blunt and distant, yet admired for his combat skills, Kei Namisaki, who is mature, yet at times overwhelming and indignant, Toma Asahi, who is a helpful and devoted honor student, Shiduru Nagamiya who is admired for her beauty, Wakaba Shinomori who is athletic and straight to the point, and Ichika Otoha, who is polite and reserved, but distant. Different endings arise depending on the player's efforts and decisions in guiding the students of the class.

== Gameplay ==
Xicatrice plays as a JRPG with turn-based battles with life sim elements. The player assumes the role of a teacher guiding students. In the life sim parts of the game, the player interacts with the students and creates a weekly lesson plan that develops them as fighters in the game's battle system, causing them to learn various skills and abilities that can be used in fighting and completing missions. Missions are graded on four different levels of quality in accomplishing them. Four difficulty options are available for the player to select. If the player does poorly and gets a bad ending, bonuses are awarded that help guide the player to better endings in subsequent playthroughs.

== Development ==
The game was first announced in February 2023, as a game being developed and published by Nippon Ichi Software The developers described it as a "superpowers x academy RPG". The title is a play on the French word "cicatrice", which means "healing scars", and ties into the game's themes of students working through their respective emotional scars. The game is another in Nippon Ichi's efforts to develop and publish role-playing games in a school setting, following Monark (2022).

The game was released in Japan on June 29, 2023, for the Nintendo Switch, PlayStation 4, and PlayStation 5. A decision on making a possible English localization has not been announced, though publications noted it seemed to be a likely candidate for it by Nippon Ichi's Western branch, NIS America.

== Reception ==
Famitsu's four reviewers, on a scale of 1 to 10, gave the game a score of 7/7/7/8 (29/40).
