= Ryan Brahms =

American singer

- Origin: New York, United States
- Genres: R&B; pop
- Occupation: Singer-songwriter
- Years active: 2013–present
- Labels: 3QProductions

Ryan Brahms is an American singer-songwriter and multi-instrumentalist, based in New York. His song "Love Dealer" has been successful, charting on the Dance Club Songs chart at 37.

== Career ==
HuffPost described Brahm's music as "[a blend of] elements of R&B and pop into a unique, powerful style of music full of emotion and energy."

In 2017, he released the single "Love Dealer", an R&B-inspired song which was produced by himself and David Wade. It was directed by David Montoya in Cartagena, Colombia.

== Discography ==
=== Charted singles ===
Title	Year	Peak chart positions	Album
Title	Year	US Club	Album
"Love Dealer"	2017	22	Non-album singles
