= Summer Time Rendering =

Japanese manga series by Yasuki Tanaka and its franchise

- First tankōbon volume cover, featuring Ushio Kofune (left) and Shinpei Ajiro (right)

サマータイムレンダ (Samā Taimu Renda)
- Genre: Mystery; Supernatural; Suspense
- Manga
- Written by: Yasuki Tanaka
- Published by: Shueisha
- English publisher: NA: Udon Entertainment
- Imprint: Jump Comics+
- Magazine: Shōnen Jump+
- Original run: October 23, 2017 – February 1, 2021
- Volumes: 13
- Anime television series
- Directed by: Ayumu Watanabe
- Written by: Hiroshi Seko
- Music by: Keiichi Okabe; Ryuichi Takada; Keigo Hoashi
- Studio: OLM Team Kojima
- Licensed by: Disney Platform Distribution
- Original network: Tokyo MX, BS11, Kansai TV, KBC
- Original run: April 15, 2022 – September 30, 2022
- Episodes: 25
- Manga

Summer Time Rendering 2026: The Room that Dreams of Murder
- Written by: Yasuki Tanaka
- Published by: Shueisha
- Imprint: Jump Comics+
- Magazine: Shōnen Jump+
- Original run: April 14, 2022 – April 15, 2022
- Volumes: 1
- Light novel

Summer Time Rendering 2026: Nagumo Ryūnosuke's 100 Views
- Written by: Hotori Handa
- Published by: Shueisha
- Imprint: Jump J-Books
- Published: October 4, 2022
- Video game

Summer Time Rendering: Another Horizon
- Developer: Mages
- Publisher: Mages
- Genre: Visual novel
- Platform: PlayStation 4; Nintendo Switch
- Released: JP: January 26, 2023
- Live-action film
- Directed by: Ken Ninomiya
- Released: 2027
- icon

Summer Time Rendering (Japanese: サマータイムレンダ, Hepburn: Samā Taimu Renda (Note: Summer Time Render)), also written as Summertime Rendering, is a Japanese manga series written and illustrated by Yasuki Tanaka. It was serialized on Shueisha's digital magazine Shōnen Jump+ from October 2017 to February 2021, with its chapters collected in thirteen tankōbon volumes. An anime television series adaptation produced by OLM aired from April to September 2022. A live-action film adaptation is set to premiere in 2027.

== Synopsis ==
=== Setting ===
Summer Time Rendering takes place in Hitogashima, a fictional island based on Tomogashima located in Kitan Strait in Wakayama Prefecture. While Tomogashima itself is an uninhabited island, Tanaka imagined how it might have been if it were an inhabited island.

In the story, Hitogashima is set as an island with a population of about 700 people. The village is depicted based on the Kada district of Wakayama City and Ogijima in Kagawa Prefecture. The places names in Hitogashima, such as "Takanosuyama" and "Torajima", are taken from the real Tomogashima.

The Shadows (影, Kage) are mysterious creatures similar to Doppelgängers, who act as the main antagonist of the story. They are able to copy the appearance and memories of humans, impersonate them, and then try to kill them and take their place. They are also able to copy inanimate objects, to some limitations. These creatures are led by Hiruko, a god enshrined in Hito Shrine that they call "mother".

=== Plot ===
Following the death of his parents, Shinpei Ajiro grew up with the Kofune sisters, Ushio and Mio, before heading to Tokyo to live alone. Two years later, on July 22, 2018, he returns to his hometown of Hitogashima to attend Ushio's funeral, following news of her drowning. However, Shinpei becomes suspicious when he receives news of strangle marks around Ushio's neck, implying that she was murdered. Mio confessed to Shinpei that a few days before Ushio's death, the sisters met Ushio's doppelgänger, something that the locals dub as "Shadow", a legend passed down at the island. Assisted by Mio, Shinpei tries to find the answers to what really happened to Ushio and possibly save the residents from a strange dark enigma.

== Characters ==
Shinpei Ajiro (網代 慎平, Ajiro Shinpei)
Voiced by: Natsuki Hanae (Japanese); Stephen Fu (English)
Shinpei is a 17-year-old kind-hearted teenager who once lived on Hitogashima with the Kofune family following the death of his parents. He later moved to Tokyo to become independent. His return to the island for Ushio's funeral draws him into uncovering the island's dark secrets. Shinpei has the habit of thinking objectively when he loses his composure or is upset. He is a fan of Ryūnosuke Nagumo, a writer who wrote mystery novel set in Wakayama. At some point before July 22, his right eye turned light blue, marking the beginning of his ability to loop by dying.
Ushio Kofune (小舟 潮, Kofune Ushio)
Voiced by: Anna Nagase (Japanese); Emi Lo (English)
Mio's older sister, as well Shinpei's adoptive sister who died by drowning after saving a little girl, her death prompts Shinpei's return to Hitogashima. Being half-French, her blond hair was often ridiculed when she was younger. She is bold, brazen, and hot-tempered, though this makes her capable of acting quickly and responding to sudden situations. After her death, a Shadow of her appeared in front of Shinpei. Other Shadows dub her as defective. Shadow Ushio is often seen with school swimsuit, as she copied her original while wearing one.
Mio Kofune (小舟 澪, Kofune Mio)
Voiced by: Saho Shirasu (Japanese); Merk Nguyen (English)
Mio is Ushio's younger sister who has a crush on Shinpei. Unlike Ushio, Mio is shy and meek, and it is these personality and physical differences that have led Mio to harbor much self-hatred. Her Shadow, unlike the human Mio, has few facial expressions. She has a cold and cruel personality. She always wears the sailor uniform that Mio was wearing when she was scanned, and she mainly uses a kitchen knife as a weapon.
Hizuru Minakata (南方 ひづる, Minakata Hizuru) / Ryūnosuke Nagumo (南雲 竜之介, Nagumo Ryūnosuke)
Voiced by: Yoko Hikasa (Japanese); Jenn Wong (English)
A horror-mystery writer under pen name Ryūnosuke Nagumo, Hizuru is intelligent and level-headed, capable of making accurate deductions and detailed planning. She is also a trained combatwoman and this skill is compounded by how the data of her younger twin brother, Ryūnosuke's, Shadow exists in her, allowing her to detect Shadows and move at their speed albeit with much strain on her body. She was a local of Hitogashima who left the island 14 years prior to the story after Ryūnosuke's death. She came back after receiving a mysterious voice note from Ushio. One of her novel, "Swamp Man", is actually based on Shadows.
Sō Hishigata (菱形 窓, Hishigata Sō)
Voiced by: Kensho Ono (Japanese); Jason Jin (English)
Shinpei's best friend on the island who is in love with Mio. He is the oldest child of the Hishigata family, who runs the Hishigata Clinic on the island. Sō is soft-hearted, passionate and cares deeply about human life, wanting to be a doctor to save people. He joins Shinpei in the fight against the Shadows.
Tokiko Hishigata (菱形 朱鷺子, Hishigata Tokiko)
Voiced by: Maki Kawase (Japanese); Jennie Kwan (English)
Sō's reserved little sister and Mio's close friend.
Ginjirō Nezu (根津 銀次郎, Nezu Ginjirō)
Voiced by: Jin Urayama (Japanese); Tim Dang (English)
An elderly hunter on the island and ally of Hizuru against the growing conflict on the island. Like Hizuru, he is skilled with the use of firearms, specifically with him being a talented sniper.
Masahito Karikiri (雁切 真砂人, Karikiri Masahito) / Shidehiko Hishigata (菱形秀彦, Hishigata Shidehiko)
Voiced by: Katsuyuki Konishi (Japanese); Kaiji Tang (English)
The local priest and one of Hizuru's childhood friends. In reality, he is the founder of the Hishigata clan from centuries ago, the first Shadow Haine has ever created and procreated with, making him a human–Shadow hybrid.
Shiori Kobayakawa (小早川 栞, Kobayakawa Shiori)
Voiced by: Rie Kugimiya (Japanese); Giselle Fernandez (English)
The suspicious young daughter of the Kobayakawa family whom Ushio saved from drowning.
Hiruko / Haine (ヒルコ / ハイネ, Hiruko)
Voiced by: Misaki Kuno (Japanese); Risa Mei (English)
The goddess of the island, Hiruko-sama, and the mother of all Shadows, who takes on the appearance of a young girl.
Ryūnosuke Minakata (南方 竜之介, Minakata Ryūnosuke)
Voiced by: Yūko Sanpei
Hizuru's younger twin brother who was murdered by Haine 14 years ago. When Haine tried to scan a Shadow for Ryunosuke, she went berserk and a chunk of his Shadow went to Hizuru, causing him to inhabit his older sister's body as a second personality as the fighter of the group and manifests whenever needed.
Tetsu Totsumura (凸村 哲, Totsumura Tetsu)
Voiced by: Yōji Ueda (Japanese); John Choi (English)
The local and only police officer on the island, the sleazy Totsumura is also a relative of the Kofune family.
Seidō Hishigata (菱形 青銅, Hishigata Seidō)
Voiced by: Akio Otsuka (Japanese); Sean Burgos (English)
Sō and Tokiko's father, the local doctor and coroner.
Alain Kofune (小舟 アラン, Kofune Aran)
Voiced by: Tesshō Genda (Japanese); Ping Wu (English)
Ushio and Mio's father who is French origin, as well as Shinpei's adoptive father. He runs a bistro called "Bistro Kofune". He lost his wife when giving birth to Mio.

== Media ==
=== Manga ===
Written and illustrated by Yasuki Tanaka, Summer Time Rendering, was serialized in Shueisha's digital magazine Shōnen Jump+ from October 23, 2017, to February 1, 2021. The series was also simultaneously published on the app and website Manga Plus. Shueisha collected its chapters in 13 individual tankōbon volumes, released from February 2, 2018, to April 2, 2021.

In North America, the manga was licensed for English release by Udon Entertainment. They released the series in a six-volume paperback omnibus edition from June 1 to September 6, 2022. They also announced a simultaneous hardcover edition which was delayed, and ultimately released on December 20, 2022.

A two-part spin-off, titled Summer Time Rendering 2026: The Room that Dreams of Murder (サマータイムレンダ2026 未然事故物件, Samā Taimu Renda 2026 Mizen Jikobukken), was published on Shōnen Jump+ on April 14–15, 2022. It was published in English on Manga Plus. Shueisha released the collected volume on July 4, 2022.

==== Volumes ====
===== Japanese release =====
No.	Release date	ISBN
1	February 2, 2018	978-4-08-881339-4
2	June 4, 2018	978-4-08-881554-1
3	September 4, 2018	978-4-08-881606-7
4	December 4, 2018	978-4-08-881654-8
5	February 4, 2019	978-4-08-881753-8
6	May 2, 2019	978-4-08-881837-5
7	August 2, 2019	978-4-08-882024-8
8	October 4, 2019	978-4-08-882126-9
9	January 4, 2020	978-4-08-882191-7
10	May 13, 2020	978-4-08-882291-4
11	August 4, 2020	978-4-08-882403-1
12	November 4, 2020	978-4-08-882513-7
13	April 2, 2021	978-4-08-882612-7

===== English release =====
No.	Release date	ISBN
1	June 1, 2022	978-1-77294-232-3
2	June 14, 2022	978-1-77294-233-0
3	June 14, 2022	978-1-77294-234-7
4	August 2, 2022	978-1-77294-235-4
5	September 6, 2022	978-1-77294-236-1
6	September 6, 2022	978-1-77294-237-8

=== Real escape game ===
A real escape game was announced at the end of the series' 139th and final chapter in February 2021. The game, produced by Scrap, took place on the island of Tomogashima, which inspired the setting of Summer Time Rendering, for one day only on July 22, 2021.

=== Anime ===
An anime adaptation was announced at the end of the series' 139th and final chapter in February 2021. It was later confirmed to be a 25-episode television series. The series was produced by OLM and directed by Ayumu Watanabe, with Hiroshi Seko overseeing the series' scripts, Miki Matsumoto designing the characters, and Kusanagi handling the art. Keiichi Okabe, Ryuichi Takada, and Keigo Hoashi composed the music at MONACA. It aired from April 15 to September 30, 2022, on Tokyo MX, BS11, and Kansai TV. (Note: Tokyo MX listed the series premiere on April 14 at 24:00, which is effectively April 15 at midnight.) The first opening theme is "Hoshi ga Oyogu" (星が泳ぐ; "The Stars Swim"), performed by Macaroni Enpitsu, while the first ending theme song is "Kaika" (回夏), performed by cadode. The second opening theme song is "Natsuyume Noisy" (夏夢ノイジー; "A Noisy Summer Dream"), performed by Asaka, while the second ending theme song is "Shitsuren Song Takusan Kiite Naite Bakari no Watashi wa Mō" (失恋ソング沢山聴いて 泣いてばかりの私はもう。; "I've Listened to Many Songs About Broken Hearts, It's Too Late For Me Who Only Cries"), performed by Riria.

Disney Platform Distribution acquired the series for global streaming; it became available in South Asia and Southeast Asia during 2022, and became available on Hulu in the United States, in Japanese with English subtitles and with an English dub, on January 11, 2023.

=== Light novel ===
Summer Time Rendering 2026: Nagumo Ryūnosuke's 100 Views (サマータイムレンダ2026 小説家・南雲竜之介の異聞百景, Samā Taimu Renda 2026 Nagumo Ryunosuke no Ibun Hyakkei), a light novel by Hotori Handa and a continuation of The Room that Dreams of Murder manga, was released on October 4, 2022, under Shueisha's Jump J-Books imprint.

=== Video game ===
A visual novel, titled Summer Time Rendering: Another Horizon (サマータイムレンダAnother Horizon, Samā Taimu Renda Anazā Horaizun) was announced by Mages in July 2022. The game retells the events of the anime, and also follows six original stories, with an original ending. In addition to the characters in the series, the game also features an original character designed by the series' author Yasuki Tanaka, named Kaori Koyuba (voiced by Yui Ogura). The cast members from the anime reprised their roles in the game. It was released for PlayStation 4 and Nintendo Switch in Japan on January 26, 2023. The limited edition of the game includes an official guidebook and an original soundtrack CD.

=== Live-action film ===
A live-action adaptation was announced at the end of the series' 139th and final chapter in February 2021. It was later revealed to be a film, which will be directed by Ken Ninomiya and is set to premiere in 2027.

== Reception ==
Kōhei Horikoshi, My Hero Academia's author and Tanaka's ex-assistant, made positive comments about the series.

In a review of the first volume, Erica Friedman, writing for Anime News Network called the series a "can't-put-down kind of read", praising its art and story, adding as well that it has a "nice balance between the people, the setting, the action, and the horror." Friedman, however, criticized its fanservice, stating that "[it] can be distracting".

== See also ==
- Ghost Fixers, another manga series by Yasuki Tanaka
