= Hiroshi Seko =

Japanese anime screenwriter

- 瀬古浩司
- Born: Nagoya, Japan
- Occupation: Anime screenwriter
- Years active: 2010–present
- Notable work: Attack on Titan, Mob Psycho 100, Vinland Saga, Jujutsu Kaisen, Chainsaw Man

Hiroshi Seko (Japanese: 瀬古浩司, Hepburn: Seko Hiroshi) is a Japanese anime screenwriter. After serving as an episode screenwriter, he was given the role of head screenwriter for Seraph of the End. Since then, he has done screenwriting for many other series, such as critically acclaimed titles Attack on Titan, Mob Psycho 100, Vinland Saga, Jujutsu Kaisen, and Chainsaw Man. He frequently collaborates with Wit Studio and MAPPA.

== Biography ==
Hiroshi Seko was born in Nagoya, Japan. After doing episode scripts for Panty & Stocking with Garterbelt, Attack on Titan and Terror in Resonance, Seko was put in charge of doing all the screenwriting in the anime adaptation of Seraph of the End. Seko also wrote the Attack on Titan: Lost Girls novel. In 2016, Seko did the screenwriting for the anime adaptation of Mob Psycho 100, which was nominated for Anime of the Year and won the award for Best Action at the Crunchyroll's inaugural Anime Awards.

In 2019, he did the screenwriting for the anime adaptation of Vinland Saga and the second season of Mob Psycho 100, both of which were nominated for Anime of the Year at the 4th Crunchyroll Anime Awards. Vinland Saga won the award for Best Drama. In 2020, he did the screenwriting for Jujutsu Kaisen and Dorohedoro. At the 5th Crunchyroll Anime Awards, the former won Anime of the Year, while the latter was nominated for the same top prize and Best Fantasy.

== Works ==
=== Television series ===
- Panty & Stocking with Garterbelt (パンティ&ストッキングwithガーターベルト, Panti ando Sutokkingu wizu Gātāberuto) (2010) (episode screenwriter)
- Attack on Titan (進撃の巨人, Shingeki no Kyojin) (2013–2023) (episode screenwriter (seasons 1–3); screenwriter (season 4))
- Terror in Resonance (残響のテロル, Zankyō no Teroru) (2014) (episode screenwriter)
- Seraph of the End (終わりのセラフ, Owari no Serafu) (2015) (screenwriter)
- Ajin: Demi-Human (亜人, Ajin) (2015–2016) (screenwriter)
- Mob Psycho 100 (モブサイコ100, Mobu Saiko Hyaku) (2016–2023) (screenwriter)
- Inuyashiki (いぬやしき) (2017) (screenwriter)
- Banana Fish (2018) (screenwriter)
- Vinland Saga (ヴィンランド・サガ, Vinrando Saga) (2019–2023) (screenwriter)
- Dorohedoro (ドロヘドロ, Doro-hedoro) (2020) (screenwriter)
- Deca-Dence (デカダンス, Dekadansu) (2020) (screenwriter)
- Jujutsu Kaisen (呪術廻戦) (2020–) (screenwriter)
- The Idaten Deities Know Only Peace (平穏世代の韋駄天達, Heion Sedai no Idaten-tachi) (2021) (screenwriter)
- Summer Time Rendering (サマータイムレンダ, Samā Taimu Renda) (2022) (screenwriter)
- Chainsaw Man (チェンソーマン, Chensō Man) (2022) (screenwriter)
- Zom 100: Bucket List of the Dead (ゾン100～ゾンビになるまでにしたい100のこと～, Zon 100: Zonbi ni Naru made ni Shitai 100 no Koto) (2023) (screenwriter)
- Wind Breaker (2024–2025) (screenwriter)
- Dandadan (ダンダダン) (2024–) (screenwriter)
- Gachiakuta (ガチアクタ) (2025–) (screenwriter)
- Rooster Fighter (ニワトリ・ファイター, Niwatori Faitā) (2026) (screenwriter)
- Witch Hat Atelier (とんがり帽子のアトリエ, Tongari Bōshi no Atorie) (2026) (screenwriter)
- Thunder 3 (サンダー3, Sandā Surī) (2026) (screenwriter)
- Nue's Exorcist (鵺の陰陽師, Nue no Onmyōji) (2027) (screenwriter)

=== Original net animations ===
- Levius (レビウス, Rebiusu) (2019) (screenwriter)
- Spriggan (スプリガン, Supurigan) (2022) (screenwriter)
- Gamera Rebirth (ガメラ-リバース-, Gamera-ribāsu-) (2023) (screenwriter)
- Star Wars: Visions (2025) (episode screenwriter, episode "The Bounty Hunters")

=== Films ===
- The Empire of Corpses (屍者の帝国, Shisha no Teikoku) (2015) (screenplay)
- Ajin: Demi-Human (亜人, Ajin) (live-action) (2017) (screenwriter)
- Twittering Birds Never Fly: The Clouds Gather (囀る鳥は羽ばたかない The clouds gather, Saezuru Tori wa Habatakanai: The Clouds Gather) (2020) (screenwriter)
- Jujutsu Kaisen 0 (劇場版 呪術廻戦 0, Gekijō-ban Jujutsu Kaisen 0) (2021) (screenwriter)
- Chainsaw Man – The Movie: Reze Arc (劇場版 チェンソーマン レゼ篇, Gekijō-ban Chensō Man Reze-hen) (2025) (screenwriter)

=== Novels ===
- Attack on Titan: Lost Girls (進撃の巨人 LOST GIRLS, Shingeki no Kyojin: Lost Girls) (2014)
