= Yoshimi Iwasaki =

Japanese singer and actress (born 1961)

Yoshimi Iwasaki 岩崎良美
- Born: Yoshimi Iwasaki; June 15, 1961 (age 65); Kōtō, Tokyo, Japan
- Genres: J-pop; Kayōkyoku
- Occupations: Singer; actress
- Instrument: Vocals
- Years active: 1978–present
- Label: Pony Canyon
- Website: iwasakiyoshimi.com

Yoshimi Iwasaki (岩崎良美, Iwasaki Yoshimi; born June 15, 1961) is a Japanese singer and actress.

== Career ==
Iwasaki is notable for singing most of the various theme songs for the anime television series Touch along with Yumekojo.

In 2008, she joined the fantasy band Sound Horizon for the release of their 6th story CD Moira. However, she left the band for undisclosed reasons prior to the 6th Story Concert and was subsequently replaced by Azumi Inoue. She appeared in the No Laughing Hotel Man special of the popular variety show Gaki no Tsukai which took place in 2009, performing a new version of the song Touch with slightly altered lyrics.

== Personal life ==
Her older sister Hiromi Iwasaki is also a singer.

== Discography ==
=== Albums ===
Studio Albums
Title	Details
Ring-a-Ding	Released: July 21, 1980; Label: Canyon; Format: LP, Cassette, CD (box-set), DD, Streaming
SAISONS	Released: December 12, 1980; Label: Canyon; Format: LP, Cassette, CD (box-set), DD, Streaming
Weather Report	Released: July 21, 1981; Label: Canyon; Format: LP, Cassette, CD (box-set then standalone CD with bonus tracks), DD, Streaming
心のアトリエ (Kokoro no Atelier)	Released: December 5, 1981; Label: Canyon; Format: LP (with bonus seven-inch record), Cassette, CD (box-set), DD, Streaming
Cecile	Released: June 21, 1982; Label: Canyon; Format: LP, Cassette, CD (first album to be pressed on the format by the label), DD, Streaming
唇に夢の跡 (Kuchibiru ni Yume no Ato)	Released: March 21, 1983; Label: Canyon; Format: LP, Cassette, CD (box-set), DD, Streaming
Save me	Released: November 21, 1983; Label: Canyon; Format: LP, Cassette, CD (box-set), DD, Streaming
Wardrobe	Released: September 5, 1984; Label: Canyon; Format: LP, Cassette, CD (box-set then standalone CD with bonus tracks), DD, Streaming
half time	Released: September 5, 1985; Label: Canyon; Format: LP, Cassette, CD, DD, Streaming
cruise	Released: July 21, 1986; Label: Canyon; Format: LP, Cassette, CD, DD, Streaming
bllizzard	Released: November 21, 1986; Label: Canyon; Format: LP, Cassette, CD, DD, Streaming
床に、シンデレラのTシャツ。 (Yuka ni, Shinderera no tīshatsu.)	Released: November 21, 1987; Label: Pony Canyon; Format: LP, Cassette, CD, DD, Streaming
月夜にGOOD LUCK (Tsukiyo ni Good Luck)	Released: September 21, 1989 (reissued and expanded on September 3, 2015); Label: CBS/Sony; Format: LP, Cassette, CD, DD, Streaming
La confusion	Released: March 30, 2000; Label: ファースト・パブリシティー (First Publicity); Format: CD
Qui est-ce?	Released: September 28, 2000; Label: ファースト・パブリシティー (First Publicity); Format: CD
岩崎良美ヴォーカルアルバム 赤と黒から...I (Yoshimi Iwasaki vu~ōkaruarubamu Aka to Kuro kara... I)	Released: December 5, 2009; Label: Merci beaucoup; Format: CD
岩崎良美ヴォーカルアルバム 赤と黒から...II あなた色のマノン (Yoshimi Iwasaki vu~ōkaruarubamu Aka to Kuro kara... II Anata Iro no Manon)	Released: October 6, 2010; Label: Merci beaucoup; Format: CD
岩崎良美ヴォーカルアルバム 赤と黒から...III 愛してモナムール (Yoshimi Iwasaki vu~ōkaruarubamu Aka to Kuro kara... III Aishite Mon Amour)	Released: April 10, 2013; Label: Merci beaucoup; Format: CD
My Life	Released: September 3, 2016; Label: Knockout inc.; Format: CD, DD, Streaming
Someday	Released: September 1, 2017; Label: Knockout inc.; Format: CD, DD, Streaming
Chanter chanter chanter	Released: April 3, 2020; Label: Yoshimi Iwasaki (Self-released); Format: CD, DD, Streaming

Cover Albums
Title	Details
色彩の主人公 (Shikisai no shujinkō)	Released: November 2, 2011; Label: Bellwood; Format: CD, DD, Streaming
THE REBORN SONGS〜シクラメン〜 (THE REBORN SONGS〜shikuramen〜)	Released: September 3, 2016; Label: Tokuma Japan Communications; Format: CD

Soundtracks
Title	Details
タッチ (Touch)	Released: November 21, 1985; Label: Canyon; Format: LP, Cassette, CD, DD, Streaming

Live Albums
Title	Details
LIVE〜女の子だけのコンサート〜 (LIVE ~ Girls Only Concert ~)	Released: September 5, 1983; Label: Canyon; Format: LP, Cassette, CD, DD, Streaming
岩崎良美ライヴアルバム 恋ほど素敵なショーはない Yoshimi Iwasaki Debut 30th Anniversary Concert (Yoshimi Iwasaki Raivu Arubamu Koi Hodo Suteki na Show wa Nai (Yoshimi Iwasaki Debut 30th Anniversary Concert))	Released: May 26, 2010; Label: Merci beaucoup; Format: CD+DVD

Compilations
Title	Details
SINGLES	Released: December 5, 1982; Label: Canyon; Format: LP, Cassette, CD
best Palette	Released: March 3, 1984; Label: Canyon; Format: LP
BEST SELECTION	Released: December 5, 1984; Label: Canyon; Format: CD
ベスト～Cologne (best cologne)	Released: March 5, 1985; Label: Canyon; Format: LP, CD
A面コレクション (A-Side Collection)	Released: June 21, 1985; Label: Canyon; Format: CD
カスタム (Custom)	Released: August 21, 1986; Label: Canyon; Format: CD
スーパーベスト (Super Best)	Released: January 21, 1987; Label: Canyon; Format: CD, Cassette
ノン・ストップ岩崎良美 (Non-Stop Yoshimi Iwasaki)	Released: March 5, 1987; Label: Canyon; Format: CD
岩崎良美ベスト (Yoshimi Iwasaki Best)	Released: January 21, 1988; Label: Pony Canyon; Format: CD, Cassette
フォーエヴァー・アイドル・ベスト・シリーズ 岩崎良美 (Forever Idol Best Series Yoshimi Iwasaki)	Released: August 21, 1989; Label: Pony Canyon; Format: CD
MY これ！クション 岩崎良美BEST (My This! Yoshimi Iwasaki Best)	Released: November 5, 2001; Label: Pony Canyon; Format: CD
りばいばる 岩崎良美 (Riba ibaru Yoshimi Iwasaki)	Released: January 17, 2007; Label: Pony Canyon; Format: CD
岩崎良美 SINGLESコンプリート (Yoshimi Iwasaki Singles Complete)	Released: August 17, 2007; Label: Pony Canyon; Format: 2xCD
Myこれ！チョイス 04 Weather Report+シングルコレクション (My This! Choice 04 Weather Report + Singles Complete)	Released: July 16, 2008; Label: Pony Canyon; Format: CD
Myこれ！チョイス 05 Wardrobe+シングルコレクション (My This! Choice 05 Wardrobe + Singles Complete)	Released: July 16, 2008; Label: Pony Canyon; Format: CD
Myこれ！Liteシリーズ 岩崎良美 (My This! Lite Series Yoshimi Iwasaki)	Released: April 21, 2010 / May 18, 2016 (UHQ-CD Reissue); Label: Pony Canyon; Format: CD, UHQ-CD
ザ・プレミアムベスト 岩崎良美 (The Premium Best Yoshimi Iwasaki)	Released: November 21, 2012; Label: Pony Canyon; Format: 2xCD
ゴールデン☆アイドル 岩崎良美 (Golden☆Idol Yoshimi Iwasaki)	Released: July 30, 2014; Label: Pony Canyon; Format: 3xHQCD

Box Sets
Title	Details
岩崎良美 CD-BOX 80-87 ぼくらのベスト (Yoshimi Iwasaki CD-BOX 80-87 Our Best)	Released: July 17, 2002 / March 24, 2021 (PCSC Exclusive); Label: Pony Canyon; Format: 5xCD
岩崎良美 CD-BOX 80-87 ぼくらのベスト2 (Yoshimi Iwasaki CD-BOX 80-87 Our Best 2)	Released: January 7, 2004 / March 24, 2021 (PCSC Exclusive); Label: Pony Canyon; Format: 8xCD
岩崎良美 CD-BOX 80-87 ぼくらのベスト3 (Yoshimi Iwasaki CD-BOX 80-87 Our Best 3)	Released: June 16, 2004 / March 24, 2021 (PCSC Exclusive); Label: Pony Canyon; Format: 5xCD
岩崎良美 debut 30th Anniversary CD-BOX (Yoshimi Iwasaki debut 30th Anniversary CD-BOX)	Released: February 17, 2010; Label: Pony Canyon; Format: 13xHQCD

=== Singles ===
1980s
Release date	A-Side	B-Side	Peak chart positions	Sales	Album
Release date	A-Side	B-Side	Oricon Singles Chart	Sales	Album
Canyon Records
February 21, 1980	"赤と黒" ("Aka to Kuro")	"クライマックス" ("Climax")	19th	116,000	Ring-a-Ding (A-side) SAISONS (B-side)
May 21, 1980	"涼風" ("Suzukaze")	"モーニング コール" ("Morning Call")	18th	157,000	Ring-a-Ding
August 21, 1980	"あなた色のマノン" ("Anata Iro no Manon")	"夏のたより" ("Natsu no Tayori")	22nd	110,000	SAISONS (A-side) Ring-a-Ding (B-side)
December 21, 1980	"I THINK SO"	"愛情物語" ("Aijou Monogatari")	23rd	111,000	Weather Report (A-side) SAISONS (B-side)
March 21, 1981	"四季" ("Shiki")	"今夜は私RICHな気分" ("Konya wa Watashi Rich na Kibun")	30th	62,000	Weather Report
June 5, 1981	"LA WOMAN"	"夏をひとりじめ" ("Natsu wo Hitorijime")	34th	59,000	Weather Report
September 5, 1981	"ごめんねDarling" ("Gomenne Darling")	"ふれて 風のように" ("Furete Kaze no Youni")	41st	56,000	心のアトリエ (Kokoro no Atelier)
January 21, 1982	"愛してモナムール" ("Aishite Mon Amour")	"雨の日曜日" ("Ame no Nichiyoubi")	25th	85,000	Cecile (A-side) Non-album track (B-side)
April 21, 1982	"どきどき旅行" ("Dokidoki Ryokou")	"私の恋は印象派" ("Watashi no Koi wa Inshouha")	34th	63,000	Cecile
July 21, 1982	"マルガリータ ガール" ("Margarita Girl")	"Vacance"	41st	36,000	Non-album track (A-side) Cecile (B-side)
October 5, 1982	"化粧なんて似合わない" ("Keshou Nante Niawanai")	"恋・あなただけに" ("Koi Anata Dake ni")	49th	27,000	Non-album single
January 21, 1983	"恋ほど素敵なショーはない" ("Koi Hodo Suteki na Show Wanai")	"まぶしい扉" ("Mabushii Tobira")	22nd	72,000	唇に夢の跡 (Kuchibiru ni Yume no Ato) (A-side) Non-album track (B-side)
April 21, 1983	"ラストダンスには早過ぎる" ("Last Dance ni wa Hayasugiru")	"波にさらわれた恋" ("Nami ni Sarawa Keta Koi")	44th	20,000	Non-album single
July 21, 1983	"月の浜辺" ("Tsuki no Hamabe")	"Dreaming World"	47th	24,000	Save me (A-Side) Non-album track (B-side)
October 21, 1983	"オシャレにKiss me" ("Oshare Kiss Me")	"風の影" ("Kaze no Kage")	68th	12,000	Save me (A-side) Non-album track (B-side)
January 5, 1984	"プリテンダー" ("Pretender")	"ハート美人よ" ("Heart Bijin Yo")	41st	45,000	Non-album single
April 21, 1984	"愛はどこに行ったの-Please Answer The Phone-" ("Ai wa Doko ni Itta No (Please Answer The Phone)")	"ジャスミンの頃" ("Jasmine no Koro")	86th	8,000	Wardrobe (A-side) Non-album track (B-side)
July 5, 1984	"くちびるからサスペンス" ("Kuchibiru Kara Suspense")	"Manhattan Morning"	73rd	10,000	Wardrobe (A-side) Non-album track (B-side)
October 21, 1984	"ヨコハマHeadlight" ("Yokohama Headlight")	"10月のフォト・メール" ("10 Gatsu no Photo Mail")	94th	2,000	Non-album track (A-side) Wardrobe (B-side)
March 21, 1985	"タッチ" ("Touch")	"君がいなければ" ("Kimi ga Inakereba")	12th	247,000	half time
October 16, 1985	"愛がひとりぼっち" ("Ai ga Hitoribocchi")	"青春" ("Seishun")	10th	160,000	Non-album single
June 5, 1986	"チェッ!チェッ!チェッ!" ("Che! Che! Che!")	"約束" ("Yakusoku")	15th	63,000	cruise
February 5, 1987	"情熱物語" ("Jonetsu Monogatari")	"野球" ("Baseball")	31st	23,000	Non-album single
March 21, 1987	"TOUCH (EXTENDED ENGLISH VERSION)"	"TOUCH (EXTENDED JAPANESE VERSION)" "TOUCH (DUB VERSION)"	-	N/A	Non-album maxi-single
August 5, 1987	"ONLY HE"	"オ・ニ・ヴァ" ("On Y Vas")	-	N/A	床に、シンデレラのTシャツ。 (Yuka ni, Shinderera no tīshatsu.)
CBS/Sony
July 1, 1989	"硝子のカーニバル" ("Glass Carnival")	"言い訳 -A Good Excuse-" ("Iiwake (A Good Excuse)")	-	N/A	月夜にGOOD LUCK (Tsukiyo ni Good Luck)

1990s-present
Release date	A-Side	B-Side
A&E
November 1, 1998	"Message"	"冷たい雨" ("Tsumetai Ame")
First Publicity
December 10, 2001	"風のささやき" ("Kaze no Sasayaki")	"鳥になって" ("Tori ni Natte") "夢見るシャンソン人形" ("Poupée de cire, poupée de son")
TEAM Entertainment
April 18, 2007	"タッチ（21st ver.）" ("Touch (21st ver.)")	"チェッ!チェッ!チェッ!（21st ver.）" ("Che! Che! Che! (21st ver.)") "青春（21st ver.）" ("Seishun (21st ver.)") "愛がひとりぼっち（21st ver.）" ("Ai ga Hitoribocchi (21st ver.)")
GROWING UP
November 1, 2009	"ココロの色" ("Kokoro no Ito")	"モノクローム" ("Monochrome")
Merci beaucoup
October 24, 2012	"涼風 2012" ("Suzukaze 2012")	"愛は風の中に 2012" ("Ai wa Kaze no Naka ni 2012")
October 24, 2012	"Hurry Up 2012"	"ふれて 風のように 2012" ("Furete Kaze no Youni 2012")
December 12, 2012	"愛がひとりぼっち 2012" ("Ai ga Hitoribocchi 2012")	"あの日のあなたに 2012" ("Anohi no Anata ni 2012")
Link rights
February 24, 2016	リボン ("Ribbon")	"リボン（オリジナル・カラオケ）" ("Ribbon (Original Karaoke)")

== Filmography ==
- Gekisou Sentai Carranger (1996); Yoshie Tenma (4 episodes)
- Belle (2021), Dr. Nakai (voice)
