= List of Sound Horizon band members =

This is a list of members and guests artists for the Japanese fantasy musical group Sound Horizon.

== Members ==
=== Current ===
Name	Years active	Instruments	Release contributions
Revo	2001 onward	vocals, composer, arranger, guitar, percussion, conductor, accordion, bagpipes, piano	All Sound Horizon releases
yokoyan	2001 onward	album artist	All Sound Horizon releases except Halloween to Asa no Monogatari (2024)
Jimang	2002 onward	vocals, narrator	All Sound Horizon releases from Lost (2002) to Halloween to Asa no Monogatari (2024), except Ido e Itaru Mori e Itaru Ido (2010), Halloween to Yoru no Monogatari (2013) and Ema ni Negai wo! (2023)
Ike Nelson	2006 onward	narrator	All Sound Horizon releases from Shōnen wa Tsurugi wo... (2006) to Halloween to Asa no Monogatari (2024), except Ido e Itaru Mori e Itaru Ido (2010) and Märchen (2010)
Takashi Utsunomiya	2008 onward	vocals	Moira (2008)
Kaori Oda	2006 onward	vocals	All Sound Horizon releases from Shōnen wa Tsurugi wo... (2006) to Triumph of Territorial Expansion III Celebration of Revo's Inception (2009)
Yuuki Yoshida	2006 onward	vocals, harmonica	All Sound Horizon releases from Shōnen wa Tsurugi wo... (2006) to Triumph of Territorial Expansion III Celebration of Revo's Inception (2009)
Remi Tanaka	2006 onward	vocals	All Sound Horizon releases from Shōnen wa Tsurugi wo... (2006) to Märchen (2010)
Miki Masuda	2008 onward	vocals	All Sound Horizon releases from Moira (2008) to Märchen (2010)
Mari Endo	2008 onward	vocals	All Sound Horizon releases from 6th StoryConcert: Moira~Soredemo oyukinasai kora yo (2008) to Triumph of Territorial Expansion III Celebration of Revo's Inception (2009)
Haruka Shimotsuki	2002 onward	vocals	Lost (2002), Pico Magic (2003), Chronicle 2nd (2004), Elysion ~Rakuen e no Zensōkyoku~ (2004), all Sound Horizon releases from Moira (2008) to Triumph of Territorial Expansion III Celebration of Revo's Inception (2009)
Azumi Inoue	2008 onward	vocals	Roman (2006), all Sound Horizon releases from Moira (2008) to Triumph of Territorial Expansion III Celebration of Revo's Inception (2009)
Minami Kuribayashi	2008 onward	vocals	All Sound Horizon releases from Moira (2008) to Märchen (2010)
Ritsuki Nakano	2006–2008 2009 onward	vocals	All Sound Horizon releases from Shōnen wa Tsurugi wo... (2006) to Triumph~Great Invasion of Territorial Expansion II (2008), Triumph of Territorial Expansion III Celebration of Revo's Inception (2009)
Joelle	2010 onward	vocals	Ido e Itaru Mori e Itaru Ido (2010), Märchen (2010), Nein (2015)
