= Book of the Dead (disambiguation) =

The Book of the Dead is an ancient Egyptian funerary text.

Book of the Dead or The Book of the Dead also may refer to:

== Film ==
- Book of the Dead, the working title of the 1981 American film The Evil Dead
- The Book of the Dead (film), a 2005 Japanese film
- The Mummy: Book of the Dead, an upcoming 2027 American film

== Television ==
- "Book of the Dead", a 1998 episode of Night Man
- "Book of the Dead", a 2002 unaired episode of Bram & Alice
- "Book of the Dead", a 2025 episode of Midsomer Murders

== Literature ==
- Book of the Dead (Art Institute of Chicago), an Ancient Egyptian papyrus depicting funerary spells
- Bandlet of Righteousness, also known as the Ethiopian Book of the Dead, an anonymous Ethiopic magico-religious funerary text
- Bardo Thodol, commonly known in the West as The Tibetan Book of the Dead, a terma text from a larger corpus of teachings revealed by Karma Lingpa
- Left Ginza, one of the two parts of the Ginza Rabba, the longest and the most important holy scripture of Mandaeism
- Nekyia, the rite by which ghosts were called up and questioned about the future in ancient Greek cult practice and literature
- Book of the Dead (anthology), a 1989 anthology series edited by John Skipp and Craig Spector
- Book of the Dead (memoir), a 2001 memoir collection by E. Hoffman Price
- Book of the Dead (Cornwell novel), a 2007 novel written by Patricia Cornwell
- The Book of the Dead (novel), a 2007 novel by Douglas Preston and Lincoln Child
- The Book of the Dead (Lee), a 1991 short story collective by Tanith Lee
- Necronomicon, a fictional grimoire by H. P. Lovecraft
- Book of the Dead (Angel novel), a 2004 novel by Ashley McConnell
- The Book of the Dead (poem), a 1938 poem by Muriel Rukeyser
- The QI Book of the Dead, a 2009 book by John Lloyd and John Mitchinson
- Agrippa (A Book of the Dead), a 1992 book by William Gibson
- Doktor Bey's Book of the Dead, a 1981 book by Derek Pell

== Music ==
- Book of the Dead (album), a 2007 album by Bloodbound
- The Book of the Dead (album), a 1998 album by Ars Nova

== See also ==
- List of Book of the Dead spells
- Totenpass, the "passport of the dead" in some ancient Greco-Roman religions
- "The Western Book of the Dead", a 2015 episode of True Detective
- The Genetic Book of the Dead, a 2024 book by Richard Dawkins
