= Märchen (album) =

Studio album by Sound Horizon
- Released: December 15, 2010
- Genres: Symphonic metal, metal opera, folk rock
- Label: King Records

Sound Horizon chronology
Moira (2008)	Märchen (2010)	-

Märchen is the seventh story CD, released by the fantasy symphonic rock band Sound Horizon on December 15, 2010, through King Records. The normal edition debuted No. 3 and peaked No. 2 on the Oricon weekly albums chart. A limited edition sold over 40,000 copies in its first two days, 24,816 copies on the first day and 15,833 copies on the next.

== Plot ==
Once upon a time, there was a woman named Therese von Ludowig who lived far from society in Thüringen with her sickly son, März von Ludowig. However, März, being too naive to be wary of strangers, leads two men in plague masks to their home in the forest, who then condemn Therese as a witch and attribute the spread of the Black Plague to her. Although Therese attempts to fight them off, she is captured whilst März is tossed into the well outside their home, and she curses the world in her final breath before her execution. An unspecified amount of time later, with his once white hair stained black - "the color of dusk" - and having no memory of who he was, the reborn März, now "Märchen von Friedhof", emerges from the well after being awakened by a living doll named Elise. Elise compels Märchen to aid seven "princesses" in taking revenge throughout seven tales as a means of achieving her and Märchen's own revenge against the world. Each tale revolves around a deadly sin.

=== The Song of Dusk ===
Märchen having awakened at the bottom of the well knows not who he is nor why he exists, merely that he has been wronged gravely and must seek revenge. Though he has vague memories of being loved once, and loving in return, he is met with insistence that it is merely his imagination at work and that there are more pressing matters at hand. With no clear target, he follows the insistence of his companion Elise, and seeks out the seven Corpse Princesses through whom the two will achieve revenge against the world.

=== The Witch at the Stake ===
The tale of gluttony begins with a mother and child living together in poverty. The husband, a money loaner unable to provide for his family, has abandoned them, while the mother and child are accused of being witches and shunned by society. Even if abused, the child is happy to live with her mother and the animals in the forest - her only friends. But when even her mother abandons her, the child was taken in by a monastery where she became a nun. The monastery was destroyed soon after she took her vows, and so she decided to return home to find the answer behind her mother's actions. Finding the deranged old woman her mother became, the nun offers her a piece of bread, that the old woman greedily devoured. The nun then asks her mother if she recognizes her, but the old woman, having gone mad due to hunger and fear of persecution, lashes out and crucifies her daughter's body on an inverted cross. Finding his first "princess", Märchen decides to use two children to deliver an ironic punishment to the nun's mother.

Hansel and Gretel are the young children of a poor woodcutter who find themselves lost in the woods and stumble upon the old woman's house. Having inherited her money-loaner husband's fortune, the old woman welcomes the children and feeds them out of regret for not having done so with her own daughter. Seeing Hansel gaining weight, Gretel deludes herself into thinking their hostess is a wicked witch who waylays children to cook and eat them. This results in the children shoving the woman into her oven, leaving her to die in the flames. The two leave to brag of their good deed to their friend Tom, as the three children take the old woman's house as their own.

The story comes to a close with Märchen asking Elise if any old woman in a forest can be declared a witch, to which the doll expresses her disdain for cruel and dishonest children.

=== The Dark Landlady's Inn ===
A tale of greed that begins with a somewhat dim country girl born in a poor farming village before it was invaded by General Gefenbauer. Like the other children in her village who were sold away, she came to work for the aged and enigmatic landlady of the Black Fox Inn known for its famous liver dish. Unbeknowsnt to the girl is that the landlady harvested her livers from human corpses rather than buy them from a butcher to maintain her expensive lifestyle. When supplies run low the landlady goes as far to eventually hang the servant girl in order to use her liver as the number of available corpses dwindle. Lamenting that the country girl served as an unwitting accomplice, Märchen reanimates her so she can take revenge by taking the greedy landlady's liver as compensation.

The story comes to a close with Märchen and Elise discussing the flaws of the landlady's get-rich quick scheme.

=== The Princess Sleeping in the Glass Coffin ===
A tale of envy that begins with the birth of a baby girl whose white skin, red lips, and black hair earned her the name of Snow White from her dying mother. Snow White's father, the king, eventually took for his new wife a cold-hearted and vain woman who possesses a magical mirror that attests she is the most beautiful in the land. But when Snow White reaches an age where her beauty overshadows that of her stepmother's, the jealous Queen has a huntsman take Snow White deep into the forest to kill her. As Snow White pleads for her life, the huntsman cannot bring himself to commit the deed and, taking the innards of a young boar to put the Queen's mind at rest, lets Snow White flee deep into the forest where she falls under the care of seven Dwarves. But the Queen having learned of the hunter's ruse, disguises herself as an old woman and convinces Snow White to eat a poisoned apple. While it is meant to kill her, Snow White merely falls into a deep slumber as she never swallows the bite of the apple, and it remains lodged in her throat. Coming across the glass coffin Snow White was laid to rest in by chance, noting she is not dead, Märchen bids the sleeping Snow White to wait for her fated love and the chance to take revenge. Time passes, and Prince Charming travels through the land before seeing Snow White in her glass coffin. Falling in love at first sight, the prince decides to take the coffin with him and orders the dwarves to carry it. But when the coffin is dropped due to careless handling, Snow White immediately wakes up as the piece of poisoned apple is dislodged from her throat. As she and Charming set up their wedding, Snow White decrees that her stepmother be punished by dancing until she drops dead in a pair of red-hot iron shoes.

The story ends with Elise asking Märchen who is the fairest of them all, to which he responds that it is none other than Elise.

=== The Old and Unused Well of the Boundary That Separates Life and Death ===
A tale of sloth begins with a girl who is forced to do all the housework work by her stepmother and lazy stepsister after her father passes. One day, after being ordered to spindle wool by a well, the stepdaughter pricks her finger and attempts to wash her wound in the well, only to drop the spindle into it by accident. After running home in tears, her stepmother and sister chastise her and demand she get the spindle back, so the girl, fearing retribution from her stepmother, dives into the well after it. Detecting the stepdaughter's hesitation at taking revenge, Märchen offers her more time to mull over her choices as she wanders into the world of Mother Hulda, who offers the girl happiness and a way home as long as she works hard on her behalf. Eventually, Mother Hulda honors her promise and awards the girl's hard work and kindness by covering her in gold. When the girl returns to her own world, the mother sends her lazy daughter down the well to work for Mother Hulda so that she may be showered in gold as well. But the lazy daughter refuses to help in the chores her stepsister did and justly is punished by being forever covered with pitch, the dirt never coming off no matter how hard she may try to remove it, her and her mothers cries being accompanied by the chittering of plague rats.

The story ends with Märchen describing it as the cutest revenge he's orchestrated thus far, Elise amusingly calls it a fate worse than death.

=== The Princess Sleeping in the Tower of Roses ===
A tale of pride begins with the birth of an infant girl, whose birth is commemorated with a grand ceremony to which many a fairy receives an invite. As the young princess receives numerous blessings from the attendants, one uninvited fairy, Alterose, arrives and curses the infant princess to die the moment she pricks her finger on a spinning wheel come the day of her 15th birthday. Luckily, the last of the fairy godmothers uses her magic to alter the curse into one of a deep sleep until awakened by a prince's kiss. Despite the king's attempt to thwart the spiteful fairy's curse, it comes to fruition years later when the naturally curious princess is drawn to a room where an old woman is working with her spinning wheel. Having listened to the princess's story, Märchen assures her that her prince will come. Years later, having heard the tale of the Wild Rose Princess, a prince comes across a tower covered in roses and reaches the chamber where the Princess lies asleep on her bed. Upon being revived by the prince's kiss, the princess orders for Alterose's banishment from the kingdom. Refusing to let the Princess have the last laugh, Alterose casts a final curse upon her, that she may abandon her future children in the wilderness.

The story ends on Märchen and Elise commenting that injuring a woman's pride is a dangerous thing to do.

=== The Blue Marquis' Castle ===
A tale of lust that begins with a girl who had fallen in love with and married a Marquis by the name of Bluebeard, however, it was clear her affections were not returned in kind. While questioning whether or not he was having an affair, she too began to see other men in an attempt to soothe her loneliness. Upon discovering his wife's unfaithful behaviour, Bluebeard murders her in a rage, and begins a cycle of taking new wives only to murder them when they discover his previous crimes. Upon hearing the original wife's recolletion of events, Märchen insists on repaying violence with violence. Guided on the path of vengeance, the voice of the original wife beckons to Bluebeard's current one, claiming that there lay treasure in the room Bluebeard forbade her from entering. Though she promised her husband she wouldn't, the girl enters the supposed "treasure room" only to find the murdered corpses of the Marquis's previous wives. Knowing of his wife's betrayal Bluebeard makes clear his intention of killing her as well, to which the girl begs that he allow her to pray one last time. As Bluebeard awaits outside her room for her to finish, the girl cries and screams for help until his patience runs thin. Just as he is about to strike, the girl's brothers arrive to rescue her, killing the Marquis and avenging his wives in the process.

The story ends with Märchen pondering if revenge might be its own form of love whilst Elise expresses disgust at humans inability to live without love or lust.

=== The Crucified Saint ===
Märchen happens upon a church and senses a restless spirit in the statue of Saint Solicitous, asking her to tell him her tale. Solicitous explains she was once a noblewoman named Elizabeth whose devotion to the boy she once loved was strong to the point of vowing before God that she would never marry another. Her brother however, attempted to arrange a political marriage for her regardless. Upon her refusal he instead decides to have her crucified for her insolence. Though Märchen sought to give Elizabeth a wrathful conclusion to her tale, she expresses having no intention for revenge and is only glad to see Märchen again as she reveals herself to be the childhood friend of his true self: März. Elizabeth's soul passes away peacefully, having fulfilled her wish to meet him once more and finding satisfaction in having lived and died herself and staying true to her love.

The story ends with Märchen shaken into silence, as Elise screams and begs that he ignore Elizabeth's words and continue their quest for vengeance for all eternity. Märchen finally speaks only to tell Elise that it's time they stop.

=== The Song of Twilight ===
With Märchen's lost memory restored, it causes his mother's enchantment to be undone as Elise, a doll he once cherished as a boy, becomes inanimate once more. As Märchen carries her lifeless body away the two return to his mother's hut. Märchen realizes that his life will also fade and he will cease to be as dawn rises on the beginning of an enlightened age. Many years later, a group of children would come to the ruined remains of the hut and find the only proof that Marchen lived: A book titled Fairy Tales of Light and Darkness.

== Track listing ==
All tracks composed and arranged and lyrics written by Revo.

No.	Title	Length
1.	"The Song of Dusk" (宵闇の唄 Yoiyami no Uta)	10:18
2.	"The Witch at the Stake" (火刑の魔女 Kakei no Majo)	9:18
3.	"The Dark Landlady's Inn" (黒き女将の宿 Kuroki Okami No Yado)	6:53
4.	"The Princess Sleeping in the Glass Coffin" (硝子の棺で眠る姫君 Garasu No Hitsugi De Nemuru Himegimi)	8:31
5.	"The Old and Unused Well of the Boundary That Separates Life and Death" (生と死を別つ境界の古井戸 Sei To Shi Wo Wakatsu Kyoukai No Furuido)	9:19
6.	"The Princess That Sleeps in the Tower of Roses" (薔薇の塔で眠る姫君 Bara No Tou De Nemuru Himegimi)	9:00
7.	"The Blue Marquis' Castle" (青き伯爵の城 Aoki Hakushaku no Shiro)	7:38
8.	"The Crucified Saint" (磔刑の聖女 Takkei no Seijo)	8:09
9.	"The Song of Dawn" (暁光の唄 Gyoukou no Uta)	4:31
10.	"Silence" (無音 [Bonus Track])	3:23
Total length:		1:17:00

== Personnel ==
=== Musician ===
- Revo - Composition, Lyrics, Arrangement
- Nishiyama Takeshi - Guitar, Steel Guitar (#1,5,8)
- Yuki - Guitar, Classical Guitar (#1,3,4,8)
- Saitō "Jake" Shingo - Guitar, Classical Guitar (#2,6)
- Marty Friedman - Guitar, Classical Guitar (#7)
- Hasegawa Atsushi - Bass
- Igarashi Kōji - Piano, Synthesizer, Organ, Cembalo (#1,3,4,7,8)
- Kawai Eiji - Piano, Synthesizer, Organ, Cembalo, Electronic Piano (#2,6)
- Matsumoto Keiji - Piano, Synthesizer, Organ (#5,9)
- Junji - Drum (#1,8)
- Ken☆Ken - Drum (#2,6)
- Abe Tōru - Drum (#3,4)
- Abe Kaoru - Drum (#5,9)

=== Vocal, Voice ===
- REVO: Märchen von Friedhof
- Miku Hatsune (Saki Fujita): Elize
- Ayano Kanami: The Nun
- MIKI: Therese/The Old Woman/The Queen/The Stepmother/Alte-Rose
- Kiriyama Kazuki: Hansel
- Kobayashi Sayumi: Gretel
- REMI: The Country Girl
- Jimang: The Landlady/The Magic Mirror/The Huntsman
- Tomoyo Kurosawa: Snow White
- Yume Suzuki: The Prince
- Ceui: The Stepdaughter
- Azumi Inoue: Mother Hulda/Aprikose
- Chinatsu Ishii: The Stepsister
- Mikuni Shimokawa: Rose Princess
- Minami Kuribayashi: The First Wife
- Akio Otsuka: Bluebeard
- Joelle: Elisabeth

=== Voice ===
- Idolfried Ehrenberg
- Nobuo Tobita
- Miyuki Sawashiro
- Asuka Tanii
- Tōru Ōkawa
- Yuichi Nakamura
- Saki Fujita
- Sascha

=== Illustration ===
- Yokoyan

== Trivia ==
The story of the album features fairy tale stories, exploring the darker aspects of it. Well-known fairytales such as Hänsel and Gretel, Snow White, Mother Hulda, Sleeping Beauty and Bluebeard etc. can be found in the album.

"Märchen" is German for fairytales.

The number "7" has been presented several times in the album. 7 Tragic Stories, 7 deadly sins, 7 victims, 28 bonus tracks of 7 seconds each making the album total duration of 77 minutes as well as the album designed to fold out creating "七" (Kanji for 7).

Excluding the bonus tracks, when written in Japanese the tracks lengths are symmetrical, giving the track listing the appearance of a church.

The lyric booklet is made to feel like an old book or a bible.

All the songs with tragic stories contain the identical verse, but arranged in different style representing the similarities of the stories, for instance the common theme of revenge.
