= Moira (album) =

Studio album by Sound Horizon
- Released: September 03, 2008
- Genre: Symphonic metal Metal Opera
- Length: 1:19:59
- Label: King
- Producer: Revo

Sound Horizon chronology
Roman (2006)	Moira (2008)	Märchen (2010)

Professional ratings
Review scores
Source	Rating
AllMusic	3/5 stars

Moira is the sixth story CD released by the Japanese fantasy band Sound Horizon. It was released on September 3, 2008 through King Records. This album is the first and only to feature vocalists Takashi Utsunomiya, Yoshimi Iwasaki and Ayaka Naito. It is also the first album with vocalists Miki Masuda and Minami Kuribayashi and the last to feature long time vocalists YUUKI, KAORI, and Haruka Shimotsuki. The album debuted at No. 3 on the Oricon weekly album charts, selling over 45,000 copies in its initial week.

Moira's plot and Greek setting is very loosely modeled after real-life Greek mythology, the Iliad, and Heinrich Schliemann's discovery of the lost city of Troy (Ilion) using the epic as his guide during the late 19th century.

== Plot ==
The album begins with Thanatos, the god of death, revealing his plan to overthrow his mother Moira, the goddess of destiny and creator of all life, whom he sees as cruel and merciless, by using a human who will become his vessel ("Lord of Hades – Thanatos").

The frame story concerns a Russian rags-to-riches billionaire named Alexei Romanovich Zvolinsky (based on the real-life Schliemann), who pursues his lifelong dream to unearth physical evidence of the Elefseya (ЭЛэфсеиа), an ancient epic he has read and held dear since childhood, despite mockery from his peers. Eventually, with the support of his wife Eirene and his men, Zvolinsky succeeds in discovering the ruins of the lost city of Ilion ("Life's like a Nesting Doll – Matryoshka").

The Elefseya begins with an account of Moira's creation of gods and men out of Chaos ("Myth – Mythos"), before moving on to the story of Elefseus (Elef) and his twin sister Artemisia (Misia), who grew up in the countryside of Arcadia without a care in the world until one day when their parents, Polydeuces and Elfina, were killed by a general named Scorpius ("The Fated Twins – Didymoi"), who sells them into slavery ("The Slave Market – Douloi"). Meanwhile, the crown prince of Arcadia, Leontius, son of King Demetrius, is concerned about the invading Barbaroi peoples in Anatolia and a certain prophecy that foretells the destruction of Ilion by "a beast clad in iron" ("The Hero of the Thunderer's Realm – Leontius"). It is revealed that Elef and Misia are Leontius' biological siblings who were adopted by Polydeuces after an oracle declared that "The one born when darkness (Erebos) devours the sun (Helios) will weave destruction."

Misia briefly becomes the apprentice of courtesans named Cassandra and Melissa, while Elef is placed among the workers building Ilion's wall, where he is physically abused and molested by the sadistic high priest Nestor. Elef discovers that he can see shadows swarming over those destined to die soon and soon grows to resent the gods and fate, thereby slowly molding him into a vessel fit for Thanatos. Eventually, Elef is reunited with Misia after rescuing her from Nestor. They and another slave child named Orion then escape captivity on a boat before the three are separated during a shipwreck ("Wind City of Death and Laments – Ilion").

While a blinded Misia ends up on the island of Lesbos and taken under the sibyl Sophia ("The Island of Holy Poets – Lesbos"), Elef becomes an apprentice to the blind poet Milos, joining him in his travels until they come upon the ruins of the youth's home. Milos then releases Elef from his service and advises him to go to Lesbos where "an old friend" resides who could ease his heart ("Towards the Other Side of the Distant Horizon – Horizontas").

Years later, Elef is still on his quest to find Misia. Arcadian troops defeat and conquer the Amazons ruled by Queen Alexandra; she is smitten with Leontius after he nobly refuses to kill her. Scorpius, resenting the fact that he is King Demetrius' illegitimate son born of a concubine, secretly plots to seize the throne ("The Chronicles of the Dying – Historia").

Under Sophia's guidance, Misia has grown into a young woman who can read the stars to foretell the future ("Sibyl of the Star Goddess – Artemisia"). Though concerned by foreboding events relating to herself and her brother, Artemisia accepts her fate has in store when she offers herself to Scorpius as a sacrifice to the water god Hydra in place of Sophia's assistant Phyllis. Elef arrives to Lesbos too late to find Artemisia already dead ("The Dying Virgin with the Moon's reflection in Her Hand – Parthenos"); consumed in grief and utter hatred, he embraces Thanatos's temptation to enact revenge on those who wronged him. Killing his former slave masters in Ilion, Elef – now going by the name of 'Amethystos' – allies himself with the Barbaroi and gathers an army of freed slaves. Orion, who had become a famed archer in the Arcadian army and (mistakenly) believed by many to be Leontius' lost sibling, is implied to have assassinated the aged Demetrius in the meantime; he is killed by Scorpius, who is in turn defeated by Leontius ("Hero of the Slaves – Elefseus").

As the battle between Elef/Amethystos and Leontius become inevitable, Queen Isadora (who knows the truth about Amethystos) unsuccessfully tries to dissuade her son from fighting his own brother, but Leontius leaves before she can divulge the truth. Amethystos and his army invade Ilion, thereby fulfilling the prophecies of its destruction. He then fights Leontius in single combat, but as he was about to launch the killing blow, Isadora steps in between them, resulting in both Leontius' and Isadora's deaths ("The Battle of the Dying Heroes – Heromachia"). Fulfilling Thanatos' prediction that he will be fully united with his human vessel once he slays his own mother, Elef/Amethystos – now fused with the god – opens the Gates of Hades before confronting Moira, at which point the Elefseya abruptly ends.

The album concludes with Alexei musing on how the battle between Thanatos and Moira may have ended, as Eirene arrives to reveal that she is pregnant with twins, implying that history is going to repeat itself ("The Myth Ends – Telos").

== Track listing ==
All tracks composed and arranged and lyrics written by Revo.

No.	Title	Length
1.	"Lord of Hades – Thanatos" (冥王 -Θανατος- Meiō – Thanatos)	8:09
2.	"Life's like a Nesting Doll – Matryoshka" (人生は入れ子人形 -Матрёшка- Jinsei wa Ireko-ningyō – Matryoshka)	7:19
3.	"Myth – Mythos" (神話 -Μυθος- Shinwa – Mythos)	4:45
4.	"The Fated Twins – Didymoi" (運命の双子 -Διδυμοι- Unmei no Futago – Didymoi)	5:01
5.	"The Slave Market – Douloi" (奴隷市場 -Δουλοι- Dorei Ichiba – Douloi)	4:11
6.	"The Hero of the Thunderer's Realm – Leontius" (雷神域の英雄 -Λεωντιυς- Raijin-iki no Eiyū – Leontius)	4:24
7.	"Wind City of Death and Laments – Ilion" (死と嘆きの風の都 -Ιλιον- Shi to Nageki to Kaze no Miyako – Ilion)	7:34
8.	"The Island of Holy Poets – Lesbos" (聖なる詩人の島 -Λεσβος- Seinaru Shijin no Shima – Lesbos)	5:20
9.	"Towards the Other Side of the Distant Horizon – Horizontas" (遥か地平線の彼方へ -Οριζοντας- Haruka Chiheisen no Kanata e – Horizontas)	5:06
10.	"The Chronicles of the Dying – Istoria" (死せる者達の物語 -Ιστορια- Shiseru Monotachi no Monogatari – Istoria)	5:42
11.	"Sibyl of the Star Goddess – Artemisia" (星女神の巫女 -Αρτεμισια- Hoshi Megami no Miko – Artemisia)	4:31
12.	"The Dying Virgin with the Moon's reflection in Her Hand – Parthenos" (死せる乙女その手には水月 u-Παρθενος- Shiseru Otome Sono Te ni wa Suigetsu – Parthenos)	5:28
13.	"Hero of the Slaves – Elefseus" (奴隷達の英雄 -Ελευσευς- Doreitachi no Eiyū – Elefseus)	5:09
14.	"The Battle of the Dying Heroes – Heromachia" (死せる英雄達の戦い -Ηρωμαχια- Shiseru Eiyūtachi no Tatakai – Heromachia)	5:17
15.	"The Myth Ends – Telos" (神話の終焉 -Τελος- Shinwa no Shūen – Telos)	2:05
16.	"Light of the Goddess – Moira" (神の光 -Μοιρα- Kami no Hikari – Moira (Bonus track))	7:06
Total length:		1:19:59

== Personnel ==
Band Members

- Revo – vocals, guitar, accordion
- Takashi Utsunomiya – vocals
- Jimang – vocals, narrator
- MIKI – vocals
- REMI – vocals
- Haruka Shimotsuki – vocals
- Ayaka Naitou – vocals
- KAORI – vocals
- YUUKI – vocals
- Yoshimi Iwasaki – vocals
- Minami Kuribayashi – vocals
- Ike Nelson – narrator
- Rika Fukami – narrator, voice
- Yuuichi Nakamura – voice
- Norio Wakamoto – voice
- Jake – guitar, concert master
- Atsushi Hasegawa – bass guitar
- Ken☆Ken – drums
- Eiji Kawai – keyboard
- yokoyan – cover designer

Guest Musicians

- Ryou Sakagami – flute
- Watanabe☆Fire – saxophone
- Gen Ittetsu Strings – orchestra
