= Saint Solicitous =

Story first published as no. 66 of Grimm's Fairy Tales

"Saint Solicitous" (German: Die heilige Frau Kümmernis, also translated as "Saint Kummernis"), is a story first published as no. 66 of Grimm's Fairy Tales. Although included in the first edition in 1815, it was dropped in the second edition (1819) because it bore too much resemblance to Ovum paschale Neugefärbte Oster-Ayer, a legend by Andreas Strobl. Strobl's legend appears to be based on the popular medieval cult of Saint Wilgefortis.

== Synopsis ==
A princess named Solicitous was very devoted to her religion and vowed to God that she would remain a virgin and never marry anyone. When her father the King became determined to marry her off, she prayed, wishing for a beard to grow on her face so that no man would wish to marry her. Her prayer was answered, and the King, indignant, decided to crucify her. She became a saint upon her death, and a statue of her was placed in a church.

One day, a poor musician knelt down to pray in front of the statue. St. Solicitous was very happy and gave him one of her golden shoes, which he happily took home. Later, however, a notice came out that one of the golden shoes was missing. When it was found on the musician, he was accused of theft and was arrested. He begged for his jailers to bring him to the church. When they arrived at the church, St. Solicitous gave him her other golden shoe, proving his innocence. The musician was set free.

== Cultural references ==
- The story of Saint Solicitous features in Polish Nobel laureate writer Olga Tokarczuk's 1998 novel, House of Day, House of Night (Polish: Dom dzienny, dom nocny).
- Solicitous is the subject of "The Crucified Saint", the 8th track of Japanese fantasy symphonic rock band Sound Horizon's 2010 album, Märchen.
