= Roman (album) =

Studio album by Sound Horizon
- Released: November 22, 2006
- Genres: Symphonic metal Metal Opera
- Label: King

Sound Horizon chronology
Seisen no Iberia	Roman (2006)	Moira (2008)

Roman (Note: "Roman" translated from French to "novel".) is the fifth story CD released by the fantasy band Sound Horizon. It was released on November 22, 2006 through King Records. From Roman Revo himself started singing in the songs. Katsura Yukimaru also made a manga inspired by Roman under the same name.

== Plot ==
Hiver Laurant, a child who died prematurely in the womb, was given a funeral that lasted from daybreak till dusk. To make sure Hiver would not be alone in his grave, his mother has him buried with twin dolls that were named Violette and Hortense. But Hiver's spirit gives the dolls life so they travel the world and can gather stories of the world that their owner would never come to know.

=== The Unseen Arm ===
There were two men both named Laurant: One with blond hair and one with red hair. Years ago, the two Laurants faced each other in battle and the redhead took the blonde Laurant's arm. The Blonde Laurant sworn revenge as his loss of arm and phantom pain lead to him losing his job and then his family. The blonde Laurant found the redhead Laurant at a local bar one day, only to find himself unable to kill the man upon seeing him drunk and without an eye. The two then realize that they both were living meaningless lives, before the blonde Laurant was awestruck to find his former enemy killed before his eyes by a revenge-driven youth named Laurencin. The Blonde Laurant did nothing but observe while eventually realizing that his arm being cut off had its own meaning along with his life.

=== Other Stories ===
4. 呪われし宝石 (Norowareshi Houseki - The Cursed Jewel) There existed a 30-carat diamond named "Reine Michèle" (Queen of Death Michèle). This jewel always curse its owner by evoking human greed. It had passed through countless owners and being stolen countless times.

There was a man named Hiver, presumably related to Hiver Laurant. He left home to the mines in order to find something valuable enough for his sister, Noël to be wed. But, right when Hiver dug up the diamond, while holding the jewel in his hands and trembling in happiness, he was hit over the head by the owner of the mine. He died immediately, and the mining crew killed each other for the diamond. Noël, seemingly unaware of what happened, refused to marry just to wait for her brother, who would never again have a chance to come back.

5. 星屑の革紐 (Hoshikuzu no Kawahimo - The Leash of Stardust) Etoile (whose name means "star" in French) is a blind little girl. One day, her father brought home a black dog named Pleut ("it's raining" in French), who would be her lifetime friend (it's a kind of guide dog for blind people). They lived together happily as a real family till one day, Pleut became so old, weak and couldn't even move. Etoile cried so much because she knew it was dying, but from Pleut's frozen cold body she could feel a warmth. She recognized that the dog was pregnant, and would soon give birth to many more little puppies.

6. 緋色の風車 (Hiiro no Fuusha - The Scarlet Windmill) A couple was escaping from their home, ravaged by war. Quickly pursued, they ran into the forest. The pursuers were able to catch up to them and take the girl. The boy ran away without her, her frightened eyes burning into his memory. The boy, regretting his actions, promises to stay by her side to the end if they were to be reborn.

While it is never stated who the boy is, it is implied that he is a younger Laurencin, the man who would come and kill the red haired Laurant.

7. 天使の彫像 (Tenshi no Chouzou - The Sculpture of Angel) Auguste Laurant is a famous artisan, and his last creation was an angel sculpture. He took inspiration from his deceased wife who had died when giving birth to their child. Auguste couldn't overcome such great loss, that's why he sent his child into an orphanage and sworn that they would never meet again. But in the end he couldn't take it, and he often secretly entered the orphanage just to be able to hear the innocent laughters of the children.

8. 美しきもの (Utsukushiki Mono - Beautiful Things) A girl was singing about her deceased little brother. According to her singing, the meaning of "being born" is to come to this world to search for "beauty" and the meaning of "death" is also to depart to another world to search for "beauty".

The "beauty" she was singing is the peaceful sceneries of her village, and the colors of each season that passed by. Her pure singing voice and her bright harmonica sound would forever continue her little brother's song.

The deceased little brother's name is Laurant.

9. 歓びと哀しみの葡萄酒 (Yorokobi to Kanashimi no Budoushu - The Wine of Joy and Sadness) Loraine de Saint-Laurent is the daughter of a noble family traditionally manufacturing grape wine. However, she fell in love with a servant whose name she didn't even know. Meanwhile, her stepmother only cared about fashions and banquets and didn't care at all about the family's future. To ensure the family's future, Loraine's father arranged a marriage between her and an even richer family. Unable to stand that, Loraine and her servant arranged an escape but they were caught. The servant was killed right away.

Back at home, Loraine escaped again, and on the way she found the person who killed her lover, and killed him. Since then, she spent the rest of her life taking care of the grape trees just like what her loved servant had done.

10. 黄昏の賢者 (Tasogare no Kenja - The Sage of Twilight) This song is about an encounter between Chloe, a young woman troubled over deciding whether or not to give birth, and a mysterious nobleman named "Savant" ("sage" in French). Savant's real name was Christophe Jean-Jacques Saint-Laurent. He gave her many hard-to-understand advices that were as mysterious as himself. Those advices are the key to solve Roman's "Dark" side. Could it be because twilight is the moment between Light and Darkness, and thus Savant is a wise man who stands in this interval and understands everything about all Roman regardless of "Light" and "Dark" sides?

"As the "Windmill" keeps revolving, quietly weaving "Beautiful" illusions Under the flickering "Flame" those fools who extended their "Arms" Trying to seize the "Jewel" but then kept wandering in the interval of "Morning and Night" Even though the "Stardust" glitters, the "Wine" continues to invoke people into its intoxicated dream From the cage in which the "Sage" escapes, the true meaning of the "Message" is being questioned As the "Angel" sings farewell song, the Fifth Roman will be explained by the "Horizon""

11. 11文字の伝言 (11 Moji no Dengon - The 11-letter Message) There are two explanations for this song. It could be about a mother singing for her deceased son, or about a mother who is already dead after giving birth to her son. Nevertheless, the setting is the same - a cold Winter morning ("Hiver" means "Winter" in French).

This song is the key to solve Roman's "Light" side.

== Track listing ==
All tracks composed and arranged and lyrics written by Revo.

No.	Title	Length
1.	"The Story of Day and Night" (朝と夜の物語 Asa to Yoru no Monogatari)	7:27
2.	"The Flame" (焔 Honoo)	5:33
3.	"The Unseen Arm" (見えざる腕 Miezaru Ude)	6:58
4.	"The Cursed Jewel" (呪われし宝石 Norowareshi Houseki)	6:21
5.	"The Leash of Stardust" (星屑の革紐 Hoshikuzu no Kawahimo)	6:22
6.	"The Crimson Windmill" (緋色の風車 Hiiro no Fusha)	6:00
7.	"Sculpture of an Angel" (天使の彫像 Tenshi no Chouzou)	6:54
8.	"Beautiful Things" (美しきもの Utsukushiki Mono)	6:33
9.	"The Wine of Joy and Sorrow" (歓びと哀しみの葡萄酒 Yorokobi to Kanashimi no Budoushu)	6:55
10.	"The Sage of Twilight" (黄昏の賢者 Tasogare no Savant)	7:35
11.	"11-lettered Message" (11文字の伝言 11-moji no Dengon)	7:08
Total length:		1:13:46

== Personnel ==
=== Band members ===
- Revo - vocals, guitar, accordion
- Jimang - vocals, narrator
- RIKKI - vocals
- REMI - vocals
- Ayaka Naitou - vocals
- KAORI - vocals
- YUUKI - vocals
- Inoue Azumi - vocals
- Ike Nelson - narrator
- Jake - guitar, concert master
- Atsushi Hasegawa - bass guitar
- Ken☆Ken - drums
- Kyouko - keyboard
- yokoyan - cover designer
