= Ars Nova (Japanese band) =

Japanese progressive rock band

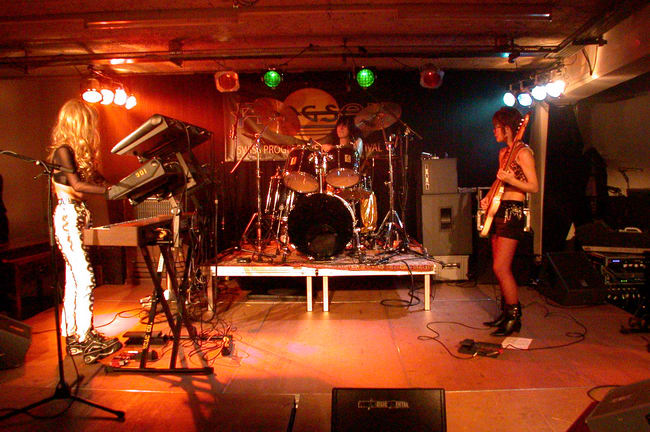
- Ars Nova at the ProgSol festival in 2003; from left to right : Keiko Kumagai, Masuhiro Goto and Shinko Shibata.

Background information
- Origin: Japan
- Genres: Progressive rock
- Years active: 1983–present
- Members: Keiko Kumagai; Shinko "Panky" Shibata; Hazime; Satoshi Handa
- Past members: Keiko Tsubata; Kyoko Kanazawa; Yumiko Saito; Akiko Takahashi; Naomi Miura; Mika Nakajima; Masuhiro Goto
- Website: http://www.arsnova-prog.com

Ars Nova is a Japanese progressive rock band. The band members are Keiko Kumagai (keyboards), Shinko "Panky" Shibata (bass guitar), Hazime (drums) and Satoshi Handa (guitar).

Ars Nova's music features a heavy use of keyboards — this was particularly true between 1998 and 2003 when the band had two keyboard players. Common sounds include the ubiquitous Hammond organ, as well as more recent digital sounds. Almost all of their music is instrumental.

The band's musical influences are ELP, Goblin, PFM, Rick Wakeman, Balletto di Bronzo and classical music. Kumagai, the keyboard player, writes all of the band's compositions. She has played on the Ayreon album Universal Migrator Part 2: Flight of the Migrator (2000). For much of its history (until Hazime and more recently Handa joined), the band was all female, unusual in the world of progressive rock.

== Band history ==
Ars Nova was formed in 1983 by Kyoko Kanazawa (bass guitar), Keiko Tsubata (keyboards) and Yumiko Saito (drums). The band covered bands such as ELP and Trace. In 1986, Tsubata left the band. Keiko Kumagai replaced her and played two gigs with the band before leaving for personal reasons.

In 1991, the band was reformed with Keiko Kumagai on the keyboards. In 1992, the band released Fear and Anxiety. The following year, Saito was replaced by Akiko Takahashi on the drums.

In 1994, their second album, Tränsi, was released. It allowed the band to be known outside Japan. In 1995, Ars Nova played a gig for the first time outside Japan, at the Prog Fest '95 festival in Los Angeles, USA.

In 1996, their third album, The Goddess of Darkness, was released and in 1997 they played their first gigs in Europe. Kyoko Kanazawa left the band in October.

In 1998, the album The Book of the Dead was released with guest bass guitarist Ken Ishita (ex-Deja Vu). A world tour began in October with Naomi Miura as a second keyboard player and bass guitar replacement.

Android Domina was released in 2001, with Mika Nakajima as a second keyboard player, followed in 2003 by Biogenesis Project, an album featuring numerous guest musicians, including Masuhiro Goto (Gerard, Ningen-Isu), who became the new drummer of the band, replacing Takahashi. Nakajima also left the band and was replaced by the bass guitarist Shinko Shibata. Satoshi Handa began playing as a guest for live gigs later in the year.

In 2005, drummer Goto left the band and was replaced by Hazime. Handa became a member of the band and played on the next studio album.

On 12 June 2022, the group announced on their website that a new album was in production. These are recordings already made in 1996 by the original trio (Kumagai, Kanazawa, Takahashi) and are complemented by current productions together with the two guest musicians Hitomi Iriyama (violin) and Zoltán Fábián (guitar). Other contributors are Sayuri Aruga (vocals), Mika Nakajima (keyboard), Satoshi Handa (guitar), Hazime (drums), and Akiko Takahashi (percussion). The new album is to be called Morgan 2021.

== Discography ==
- 1992: Fear and Anxiety
- 1994: Tränsi
- 1996: The Goddess of Darkness
- 1997: The Six Singular Impressions (compilation)
- 1998: The Book of the Dead (Reu Nu Pert Em Hru)
- 2001: Android Domina
- 2001: Lacrimaria (recorded 1992, released 2001)
- 2003: Biogenesis Project
- 2005: Chrysalis - Force for the Fourth
- 2009: Seventh Hell
- 2011: Official Bootleg Live Female Trio 1996-2010 (Live)
- 2011: Divine Night (Live 2010)
