= Kaori Oda =

Japanese pop singer

Kaori Oda 織田かおり
- Also known as: FictionJunction Kaori
- Born: May 11 1988
- Origin: Japan
- Genres: Anison, J-pop
- Occupation: Singer
- Instrument: Vocals
- Years active: 2005–present
- Labels: TEAM Entertainment; Space Craft (former)
- Member of: FictionJunction
- Formerly of: Sound Horizon
- Website: www.team-e.co.jp/sp/oda_kaori/

Kaori Oda (織田かおり, Oda Kaori; born May 5, 1988) is a Japanese pop singer. She is one of the long-time vocalists of the FictionJunction project started by Yuki Kajiura; joining the group in 2005. She has performed a number of theme songs for anime television series including Tsubasa: Reservoir Chronicle, Baccano! and Tenchi Muyo!; and for video games by Otomate including the Amnesia series. She has released five solo albums that have charted on Oricon.

== Biography ==
In 2005, Oda became involved in a music project called Harajuku BJ Girls, later named Chix Chicks. She also started collaborating with Yuki Kajiura under the project name FictionJunction Kaori. She sang on the insert songs "Tsubasa" and "Dream Scape" for the anime television series Tsubasa: Reservoir Chronicle. As part of FictionJunction, she has been a regular vocalist on their albums and concerts, and attended Anime Expo 2012 in the US as part of the group.

She also joined the Japanese fantasy music group Sound Horizon in 2006 and sang in their hit single "Shonen wa Tsurugi wo..." as well as tracks on their story CD albums Roman and Moira.

In 2007, she had her solo debut with the single "Brilliant World", which is the theme song for the video game Luminous Arc. Her second single, "Calling", was used as an ending theme to the anime television series Baccano! In 2011, she announced she had graduated from university.

She joined TEAM Entertainment in 2012. Her first solo album. Place, released on February 6, 2013, includes songs since "Brilliant World" as well as original works. She held her first solo live concert on April 14.

Her third single, "Akatsuki no Butterfly", released in 2013, was used in the Amnesia video game series title Amnesia Crowd. Her fourth single, "Reverberation" was used for Amnesia V Edition. Her fifth single, "Hana wa Utsutsu ni", was used as a theme song for the video game Shinobi, Koi Utsutsu. Her second album, Colors, was released in 2014 and reached No. 58 on the Oricon charts. She promoted the album by hosting a radio show called Colorful Mode Nippon Cultural Broadcasting's A&G Artist Zone network.

Oda released her sixth single "Tsuiso Kanon" later in 2014, and that contained more Amnesia theme songs including for Amnesia World. She performed at Connichi 2014, an anime convention in Germany. In 2015, she released her seventh single "Futari Ayatori" which was used for the video game Shinobi, Koi Utsutsu -Setsugetsuka Koi Emaki. Her single "Zero Tokei", released February 10, 2016, was used as the theme song for the Norn9 anime television series. She released her third album, Make It, in April, and held her 9th solo live concert in August. In September, she joined fellow Sound Horizon vocalist Haruka Shimotsuki on the latter's 10th Anniversary Live Tour in Taiwan.

Her single "Mugen no Dystopia" was released in 2016 and was the theme song for a smartphone video game Yodohoshi Dystopia. Her singles "Theatrium", "Run-Limit" were used as a character CDs of the similarly named series. She released her fourth album, Gift in 2017. and also had a 10th anniversary concert called 10th Birthday Solo Live. On radio, she promoted her works on the A&G Artist Zone show. In 2018, she released several songs "Suibi", "Towa no Yakusoku", and "Utakata", which were used in the Otomate video game Tensei ni mai, Sui na Hana. She released her compilation album The Best -Replay- which peaked at No. 66 on Oricon. On September 20, 2018, Oda announced on her Lineblog that she left the Space Craft agency, having been with them for 20 years including her time with Tokyo Children's Theater Company.

She sang the ending theme for the fifth Tenchi Muyo! Ryo-Ohki OVA series that was released in 2020. She also released her fifth solo album, Flowers, which reached No. 100 on Oricon.

== Discography ==
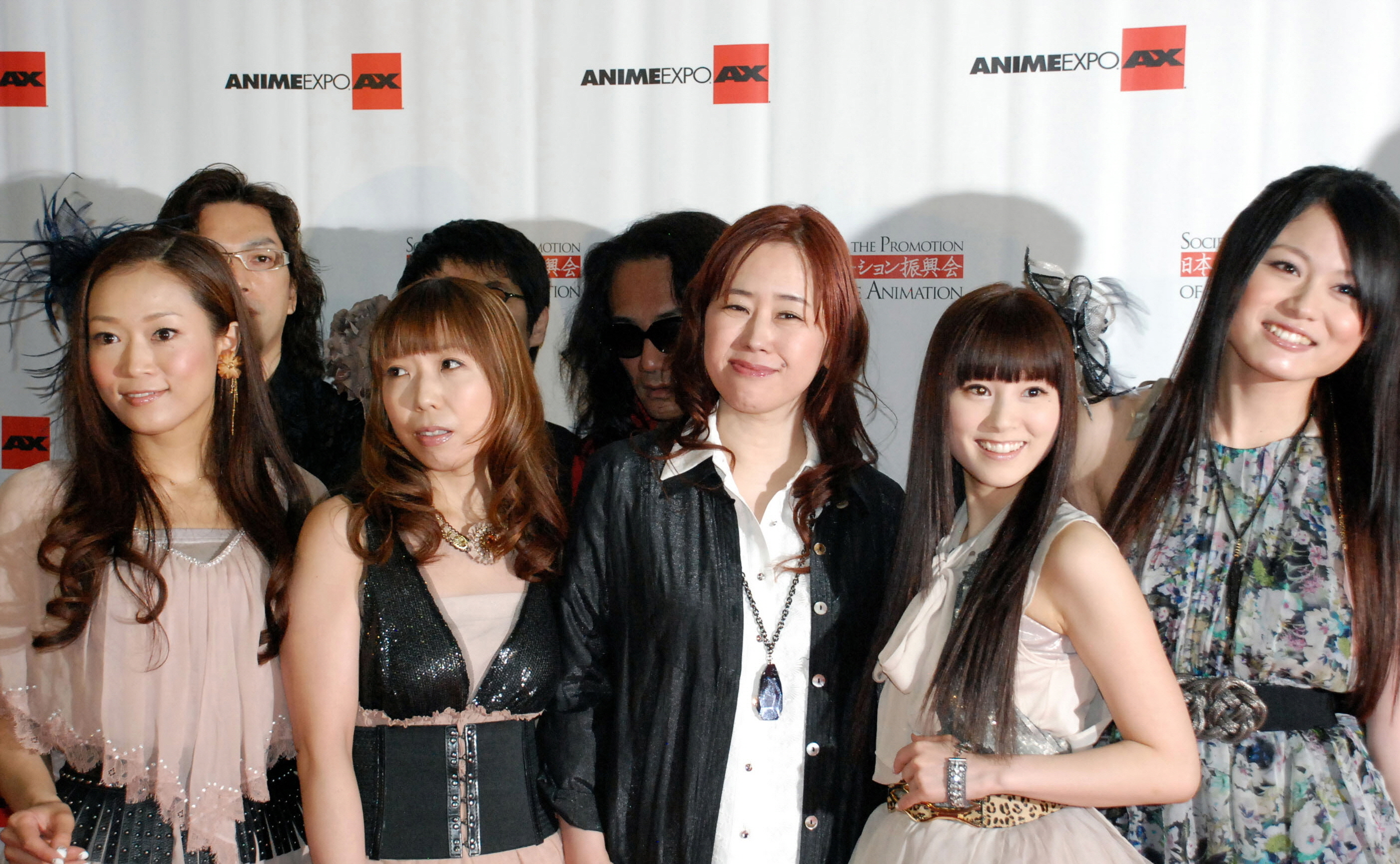
Kaori Oda (far right) with FictionJunction at Anime Expo, 2012

=== Solo singles ===
List of singles, with selected chart positions
Year	Title	Oricon		Album
Year	Title	Peak position	Weeks charted	Album
2007	"Brilliant World" theme song for Luminous Arc video game	88	2	Place
2007	"Calling" ending theme for Baccano! anime TV series	121	1	Place
2013	"Akatsuki no Butterfly" (暁のバタフライ) theme song for Amnesia Crowd video game	89	1	Colors
2013	"Reverberation"	154	1	Colors
2014	"Hana Wa Utsutsu ni" (花はうつつに)	127	1	Colors
2014	Tsuisou Kanon (追想カノン) theme song for video game Amnesia World	128	1	Make It
2015	"Futari Ayatori" (ふたり綾とり)	129	1	Make It
2016	"Zero Tokei" (ゼロトケイ) ending theme song for Norn9	53	3	Make It

=== Solo albums ===
List of albums, with selected chart positions
Title	Album information	Oricon	
Title	Album information	Peak position	Weeks charted
Place	Release date: February 6, 2013; Label: Team Entertainment; Catalog no.: KDSD-00611; Format: Digital download, CD	91	1
Colors	Release date: May 7, 2014; Label: Team Entertainment; Catalog no.: KDSD-00700/1 (ltd.), 00702 (reg.); Format: Digital download, CD	58	3
Make It	Release date: April 27, 2016; Label: Team Entertainment; Catalog no.: KDSD-00895/6 (ltd.) 00897 (reg.); Format: Digital download, CD	87	2
Gift	Release date: July 26, 2017; Label: Team Entertainment; Catalog no.: KDSD-00997/8 (ltd.), 00999 (reg.); Format: Digital download, CD	125	2
Flowers	Release date: February 26, 2020; Label: Team Entertainment; Catalog no.: KDSD-01040/1 (ltd.), 01042 (reg.); Format: Digital download, CD	100	1

=== Compilation albums ===
List of compilation albums, with selected chart positions
Title	Album information	Oricon	
Title	Album information	Peak position	Weeks charted
The Best -Replay-	Release date: July 25, 2018; Label: Team Entertainment; Catalog no.: KDSD-01013/4 (ltd.), 01015 (reg.); Format: Digital download, CD	66	1
