= Wilgefortis =

German Catholic folk saint

Saint Wilgefortis
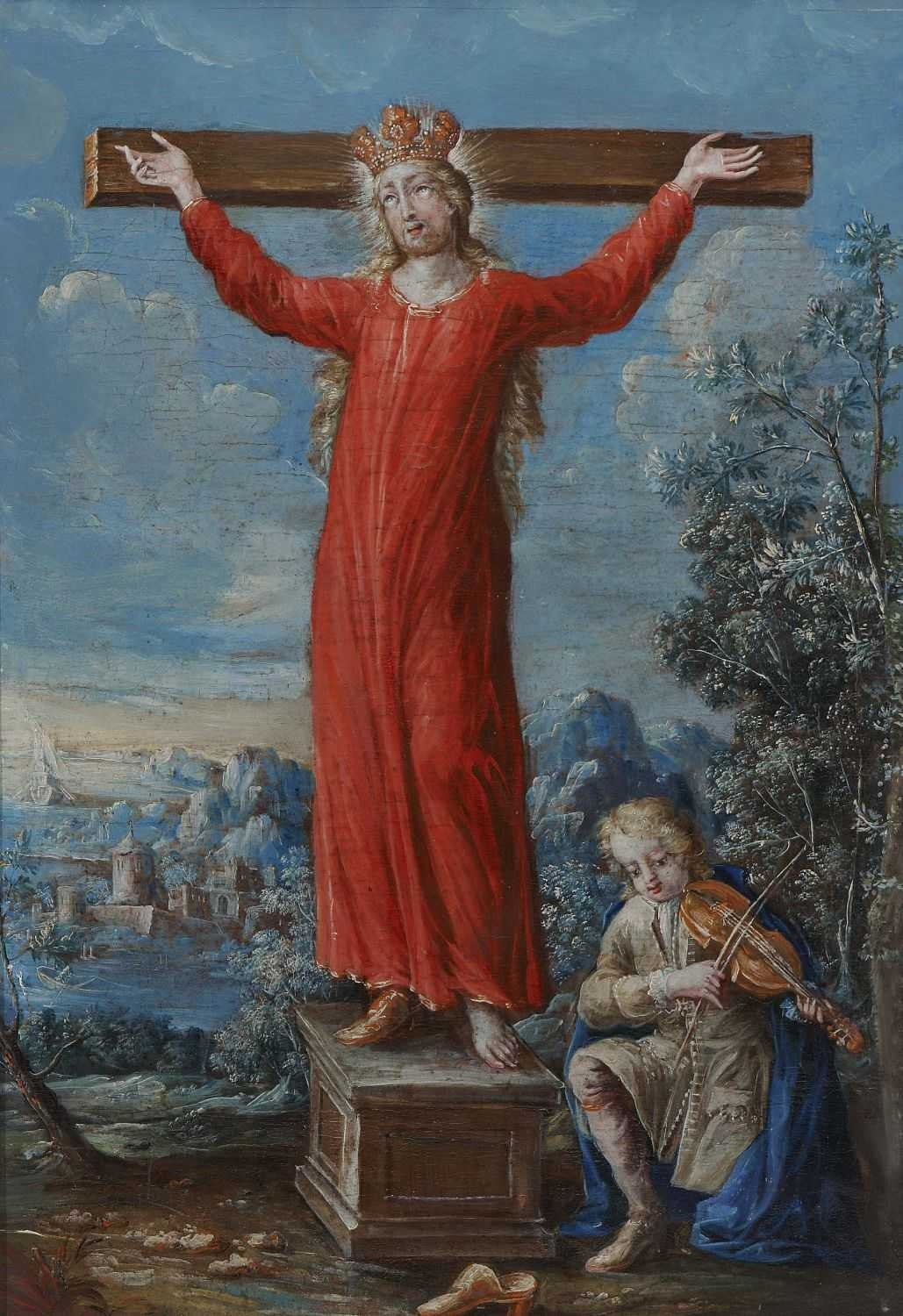
- Saint Wilgefortis, 18th century German painting

Virgin and martyr
- Venerated in: Folk Catholicism
- Canonized: Pre-Congregation
- Major shrine: Sigüenza Cathedral, Spain
- Feast: 20 July
- Attributes: Bearded woman; depicted crucified, often shown with a small fiddler at her feet, and with one shoe off
- Patronage: Relief from tribulations, in particular by women who wished to be liberated from abusive husbands

Wilgefortis (Portuguese: Vilgeforte) is a female folk saint whose legend arose in the 14th century, and whose distinguishing feature is a large beard. According to the legend of her life, set in Portugal and Galicia, she was a teenage noblewoman who had been promised in marriage by her father to a Moorish king. To thwart the unwanted wedding, she had taken a vow of virginity, and prayed that she would be made repulsive. In answer to her prayers she sprouted a beard, which ended the engagement. In anger, Wilgefortis' father had her crucified.

Her name is thought to have derived from the Latin "virgo fortis" ("courageous virgin"). In England her name was Uncumber, and in Dutch Ontkommer (meaning one who removes difficulties, specifically here from people who are suffering).

In German lands she was known as Kümmernis ("grief" or "anxiety"). In Poland she was called Frasobliwa ("sorrowful"), while in the Czech Lands she received the name Starosta ("sorrow" or "concern"). She was sometimes confused with a female martyr saint known as Liberata in Italy and Librada in Spain ("liberated") whose feast day is on July 10; while Saint Liberata is a crucified, beardless female usually with a crown, Wilgefortis is always depicted with a beard and generally crownless. In France, Wilgefortis is known as Débarras ("riddance"). The confusion between the martyr Saint Liberata and Wilgefortis extended to places such as Sigüenza, Spain, where Liberata was widely venerated.

While venerated by some Catholics, Wilgefortis was never officially canonised by the church, but instead was a popular intercessor for people seeking relief from tribulations, in particular by women who wished to be liberated ("disencumbered") from abusive husbands.

== History ==
"The martyrdom of St. Wilgefortis" by Hieronymus Bosch

Art historians have argued that the origins of artistic depictions of Wilgefortis can be found with Eastern-style representations of the crucified Christ, and in particular the Holy Face of Lucca, a large 11th-century carved wooden figure of Christ on the Cross (now replaced by a 13th-century copy), bearded like a man, but dressed in a full-length tunic that might have appeared to be like that of a woman instead of the loin cloth familiar and by the Late Middle Ages normal in depictions in the West.

The Holy Face is sometimes described as typical of early Byzantine robed crucifixes. But no comparable large carved figures formed part of Byzantine art, whilst there are several surviving from Germany. Any Byzantine influence is very remote, as the face and hair are typical of German crucifixes, and many Ottonian manuscripts show robes in crucifixions. The Byzantine examples are from icons, illuminations or small relief carvings.

The theory is that when the composition was copied and brought north of the Alps over the next 150 years, in small copies by pilgrims and dealers, this unfamiliar image led Northerners to create a narrative to explain the androgynous icon. Some older images of the crucified Christ were repurposed as Wilgefortis, and new images clearly intended to represent the saint created, many with female clothes and breasts. Some older images of Christ on the cross are argued to have already deliberately included hints at an androgynous figure for theological reasons. Single images normally showed Wilgefortis on her cross, but two prominent standing images where she carries a smaller cross as an attribute as part of a group of saints, are mentioned below. Images showing a set of scenes covering the whole legend are unusual, but a German one of 1513 is illustrated here.

== Veneration ==
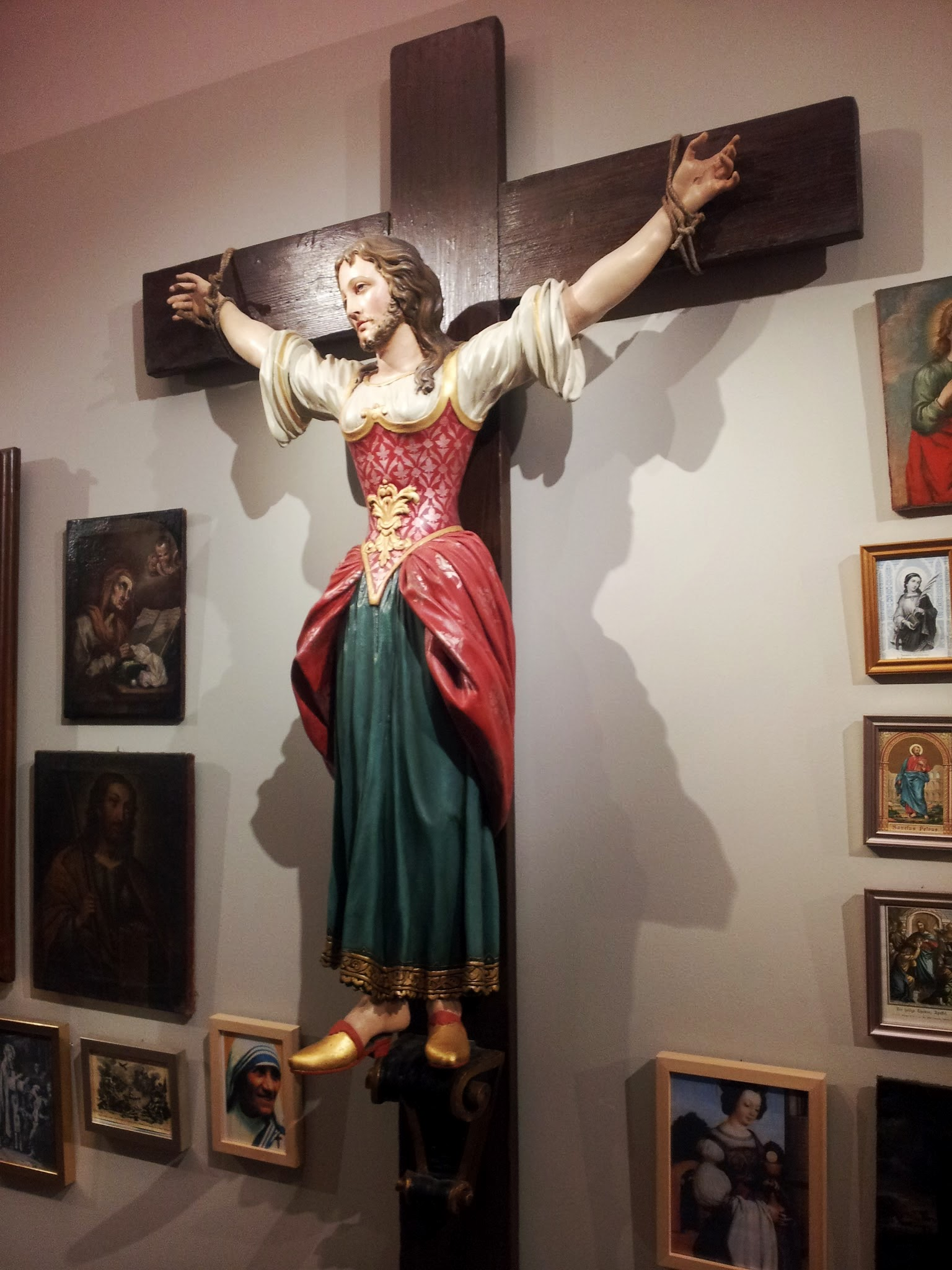
Saint Wilgefortis in the diocesan museum of Graz, Austria

The popularity of prayer in the period of the Middle Ages has been connected to the Devotio Moderna and related devotional movements, where meditation and identification with the sufferings of Christ was encouraged by writers such as Thomas à Kempis, author of The Imitation of Christ, or encouraged by Geert Groote to focus on simplicity, obedience, and following the book The Imitation of Christ, circulating from the 1420s.

St. Wilgefortis remained popular in the North of England until the end of the Gothic period; there is a carving of her in the Henry VII Chapel of Westminster Abbey, standing while holding a cross, with a very long beard. She also appears in a similar pose, very lightly bearded, on the outside of a triptych door by Hans Memling.

Her cult was decisively suppressed during the late 16th century (after a period in the 15th and 16th centuries in which she was popular), and thereafter disappears from high art, although lingering well into the 20th century in more popular forms, especially in Bavaria and Austria, but also in northern France and Belgium. In the 12th-century church of Saint-Étienne in Beauvais, there is a 16th-century wooden statue of Saint Wilgefortis on the cross. She is depicted in a full blue tunic with a substantial beard. She is venerated by the name of Santa Librada in Argentina and Panama.

She is often shown with a small fiddler at her feet, and with one shoe off. This derives from a legend, also attached to the Volto Santo of Lucca, of a silver shoe with which the statue had been clothed dropping spontaneously at the feet of a poor pilgrim. In Wilgefortis's version, the poor devotee became a fiddler, perhaps in the 13th century.

== See also ==
- Chastity
- Anorexia mirabilis
- Bearded lady
- Saint Solicitous
