= Gerard (band) =

Japanese progressive rock band

Gerard is a Japanese progressive rock band.

The current members are :

- Toshio Egawa : keyboards
- Kenichi Fujimoto (Ken☆Ken) : drums
- Atsushi Hasegawa : bass

== Biography ==
Gerard is led by the keyboardist Toshio Egawa. After being a member of Rumble in 1976, Fromage in 1976, Scheherazade from 1976, which became Novela in 1979 after a line-up change, he founded Gerard in 1983 with Yukihiro Fujimura (vocals and guitar), Masaki Tanimoto (drums), and Yasumasa Uotani (bass). The band made several gigs before recording their first album in spring 1984.

The band released a second album in 1985. In 1986, their label King Records stopped supporting progressive music, and the band dissolved. Toshio Egawa joined the hard rock band Earthshaker.

In 1990, Toshio Egawa reformed Gerard with Yukihiro Fujimura, Toshimi Nagai (bass) and Kota Igarashi (drums) for the album Irony of Fate.

After musical divergences with Yukihiro Fujimura, Toshio Egawa released, under the name "Tohio Egawa's GERARD", a solo album called Save Night by the Knight, with Toshimi Nagai, Kota Igarashi and Taku Sawamura (guitar).

After Earthshaker disbanded, Toshio Egawa decided to reform Gerard in late 1994. He recruited Masuhiro Goto (drums) from Ningen Isu, Atsushi Hasegawa (bass), both musicians from the metal scene, and Robin Suchy (vocal). They released The Pendulum in 1996 and Pandora's Box in 1997, before Robin Suchy's departure. The band released the following albums as a trio, the vocal parts being sung by Masuhiro Goto and guest musicians.

In 2003 and 2004, Atsushi Hasegawa joined progressive keyboardist and video game composer Motoi Sakuraba for two concerts, as well as performing on music for the Director's Cut of Star Ocean: Till the End of Time.

In 2004, after the release of Power of Infinity, Masuhiro Goto left the band to join Ars Nova; he was replaced by Kenichi Fujimoto.

Since 2006, Atsushi Hasegawa and Kenichi Fujimoto have performed with the band Sound Horizon.

== Discography ==
- 1984 : Gerard
- 1985 : Empty Lie, Empty Dream
- 1991 : Irony of Fate
- 1994 : Save Knight By The Night
- 1996 : The Pendulum
- 1997 : Pandora's Box
- 1997 : Evidence Of True Love
- 1998 : Meridian
- 1999 : Live in Marseille
- 2000 : The Ruins Of A Glass Fortress
- 2002 : Sighs of the Water
- 2004 : The Power Of Infinity
- 2010 : Ring Of Eternity
- 2011 : Visionary Dream
