= Bandlet of Righteousness =

Ethiopic magico-religious funerary text

The Bandlet of Righteousness (Ge'ez: Lefāfa Ṣedeḳ), also known as the Ethiopian Book of the Dead, is an anonymous Ethiopic magico-religious funerary text. It consists of a frame story about how God the Father revealed the secret names of God to his son, Jesus Christ, who then gave them to his mother, the Virgin Mary, who passed them on to her relatives. The names revealed in the work function as an amulet. When written out on a scroll and wrapped around the deceased, they will bring him to Heaven.

The text cannot be traced earlier than the sixteenth century. Two copies are known. It fuses Christian and non-Christian elements. Most notably, it has strong similarities to the Ancient Egyptian Book of the Dead.

== Origins and manuscripts ==
The Bandlet is anonymous and its date of composition is unknown. The existing redaction is probably not earlier than the sixteenth century.

It is a long text that "takes up an entire scroll". Two manuscripts are known to exist, both now in the British Library. The older is Add. 16204, which was copied between the first half of the seventeenth century and the first half of the eighteenth. The other is Oriental 551, copied in the second half of the eighteenth century.

The contents of the Bandlet would be copied onto strips of linen or parchment and wrapped around a body in preparation for burial. They had a protective and guiding function in the afterlife.

== Genre ==
Although the Bandlet "has a Christian veneer", it is a distinctly "unchristian" text. It has been called a "magic scroll" or a "book of magical texts". It may be classed with the "interdicted literature" or "forbidden scriptures" (orationes falsae), those that contravene the injunctions of the Council of Ephesus against amulets with names on them. Sevir Chernetsov notes that it is more a funerary than a magic scroll, since it was intended for the afterlife more than this life.

René Basset, the first scholar of the Bandlet, called it "Ethiopian apocrypha". Among Ethiopians themselves an etymologically similar term is used, Temhertä Hebuʾat, meaning secret knowledge. The Bandlet would only ever have been read by initiates into the magical tradition.

== Christian and pagan sources ==
In terms of content, the main sources of the Bandlet belong to Christian literature. Most notable among them are the so-called "homilies" to the archangels Michael, Gabriel, Raphael and Phanuel. Printed amulets with the names of these four can still be found for sale in Ethiopia today. Another Christian text closely related to the Bandlet is the Ethiopic Prayer of Our Lady after Her Departure from Jerusalem, which is also an unorthodox text.

The Bandlet, however, is most famous for its resemblance to the Ancient Egyptian Book of the Dead. This similarity was first noted by Boris Turaev in 1909; followed by Wallis Budge, who called it the "Ethiopian Book of the Dead" in 1929; and Sebastian Euringer, who pointed out the same similarities in 1940. Budge specifically linked it to the version of the Book of the Dead in use in Ptolemaic and Roman Egypt. Despite the similarities in both structure and content, which are sometimes labeled "influence", it is unlikely that there is any direct relationship between the two texts, separated by well over a millennium. Moreover, the Egyptian Book never circulated in the form of a book or scroll and never functioned as an amulet. The similarities between the two texts are nonetheless real.

Budge also discerned the influence of Gnostic texts and Jewish apocrypha on the Bandlet. A reference to priests making the Seal of Solomon with the scroll three times at the grave shows Talmudic influence, since in Giṭṭin 68 the king of the devils, Asmodeus, is captured by means of the Seal of Solomon.

== Contents ==
The Bandlet claims to have been written by God the Father himself with his own hands before the incarnation of Jesus. The story is that Jesus showed his mother, the Virgin Mary, her relatives suffering in Hell. Out of concern that they not perish everlastingly in the "River of Fire", Mary asked her son for the scroll with the secret names of God. Jesus at first refused, but Mary's weeping compelled him. He persuaded God to reveal to him the secret names. He then gave it to his mother with instructions on how to use it. Although Mary promised not to reveal it to "wicked evil people", it has apparently escaped tight control. In this narrative, Jesus plays the role of the Egyptian Thoth.

The Bandlet is formulated as a plea to Jesus: "when I die, and when my soul separates from my body". Yet it functions quite independently of the divinity. Through the "mighty secret name of a god" the reader may obtain power even over God. This assures his passage to Heaven:

The one, who obtains this book, will never fall into condemnation and hell. The one, who wears it and twists it round his neck, will be purified of the dirtiness of sin. The one, who will repeat it during the mess, will be free of sins. If it be made at one's funeral a Seal of Solomon by this book, angels will take him and bring before God in the Kingdom of Heaven.

== Editions ==
- Budge, E. A. Wallis, ed. (1929). The Bandlet of Righteousness—An Ethiopian Book of the Dead—The Ethiopic Text of the Lefâfa Ṣedeḳ. Luzac's Semitic Text and Translation Serie. Vol. 19. London: Luzac.

== Bibliography ==
- Chernetsov, Sevir B. (2005). "Ethiopian Magic Texts" (PDF). Forum for Anthropology and Culture. 2: 188–200.
- Chernetsov, Sevir B. (2009). "Ethiopian Magic Literature". In A. Mouraviev (ed.). Universum Hagiographicum. Gorgias Press. pp. 92–113. doi:10.31826/9781463216306-012. ISBN 9781463216306.
- Euringer, Sebastian (1940). "Die Binde der Rechtfertigung". Orientalia. 11: 76–99, 244–259.
- Gehman, Henry S. (1933). "Review of The Bandlet of Righteousness 1929". Journal of the American Oriental Society. 53 (3): 293–295. doi:10.2307/594408. JSTOR 594408.
- Lapchik, Mauricio (2015). "Resurrection in Ethiopian Christianity: A Comparative Study of the Characteristics and Development of Resurrection Beliefs in the Ethiopian Orthodox Church". Academia.edu.
- Skoss, Solomon L. (1933). "An Ethiopic Book of Magic". The Jewish Quarterly Review. 23 (4): 402–404. doi:10.2307/1451947. JSTOR 1451947.
- Stefanov, Pavel (2011). "Between Heaven and Hell: Toll-Houses of the Souls After Death in Slavonic Literature and Art". IKON. 4: 83–94. doi:10.1484/j.ikon.5.100685.
- Turaev, Boris A. (1909). "Svitok Opravdaniya" [The Scroll of Righteousness]. Zapiski Imperatorskogo Russkogo Geograficheskogo Obshchestva Po Otdeleniyu Etnografii. 34 (Sbornik v chest 70-letiya G. N. Potanina): 359–378.
