= The Book of the Dead (album) =

Studio album by Ars Nova
- Released: 1998
- Genre: Progressive rock
- Length: 44:13 (European), 45:09 (Japanese)
- Label: (Europe) Musea; Made In Japan

Ars Nova chronology
The Six Singular Impressions (1997)	The Book of the Dead (1998)	Android Domina (2001)

Japanese edition cover

The Book of the Dead (Reu Nu Pert Em Hru) is a 1998 album by Ars Nova. It had slightly different releases in the Japanese and European markets. It was generally well received.

== Track listing ==
1. "Prologue: Re" (1:35)
2. "Ankh" (5:11)
3. "Interlude 1:"
  1. Japanese: "Horus" (1:31)
  2. European: "Nut" (1:11)
4. "The 42 Gods" (5:15)
5. "Interlude 2: Anubis" (0:40)
6. "Held of Iaru" (10:43)
7. "Interlude 3:"
  1. Japanese : "Thoth" (1:27)
  2. European : "Sekhem" (1:03)
8. "The Judgement of Osiris" (7:41)
9. "Interlude 4:"
  1. Japanese : "Shu" (0:45)
  2. European : "Nephthys" (0:33)
10. "Ani's Heart and Maat's Feather" (9:20)
11. "Epilogue: Hapi" (1:01)

== Band ==
- Keiko Kumagai - keyboards
- Akiko Takahasho - drums

== Additional players ==
- Ken Ishita - bass
