= Azumi Inoue =

Japanese singer (born 1965)

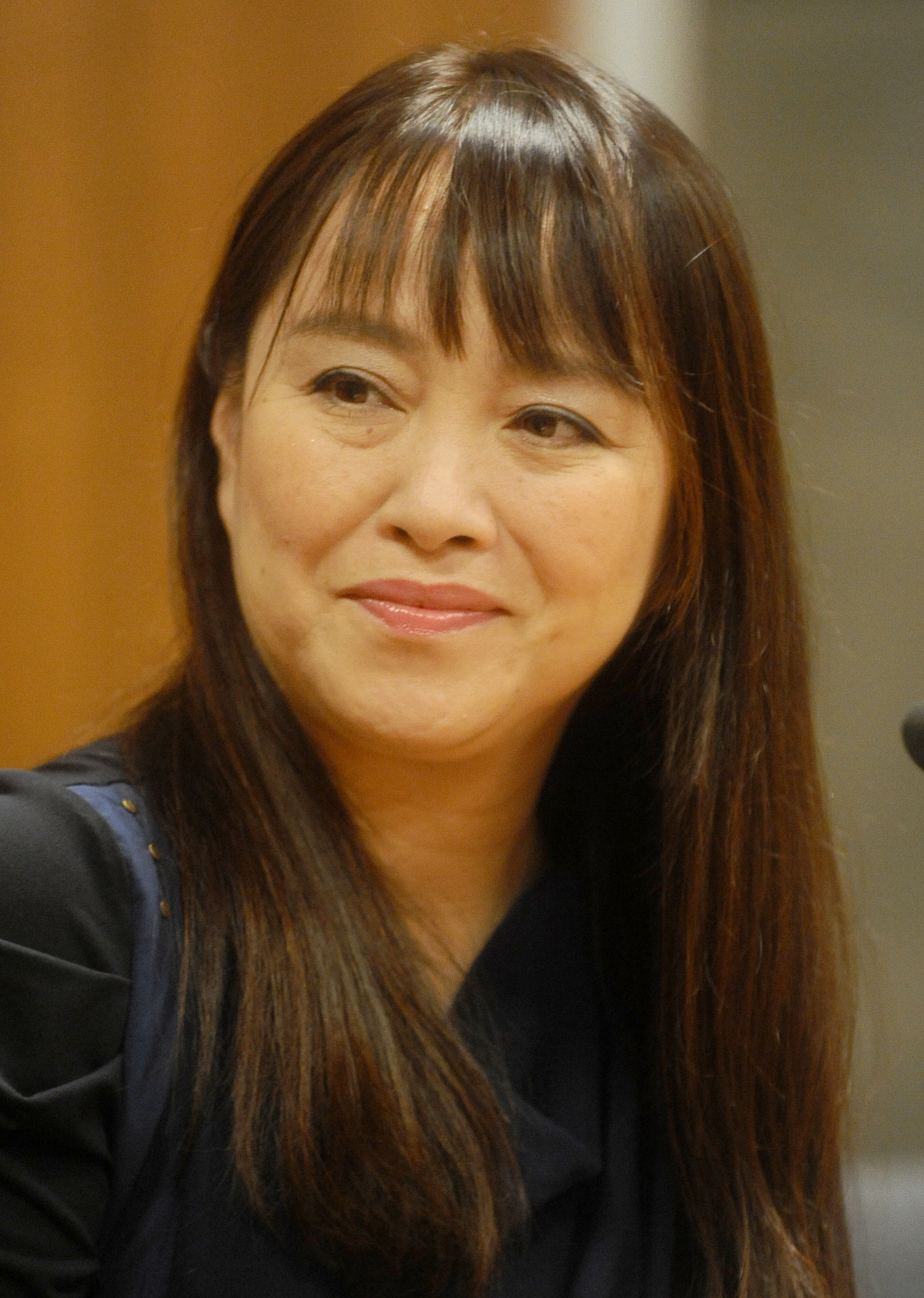
- Inoue in 2017
- Born: February 10, 1965 (age 61); Kanazawa, Japan
- Occupation: Singer
- Children: 1

Azumi Inoue (井上 あずみ or 井上杏美, Inoue Azumi; born February 10, 1965) is a Japanese singer. She graduated from Yugakkan High School in Kanazawa. She is best known for singing the opening and ending theme songs for the Hayao Miyazaki film My Neighbor Totoro: "Sanpo" and "My Neighbor Totoro". She is known for having a clear, light voice.

Inoue is managed by the talent management firm Doremi. She is married and has one child.

In 2011, she appeared in 7 out of 19 performances of "Sound Horizon Live Tour 2011 First Territorial Reconstruction Expedition". On November 11 of the same year, she performed with Kumiko and actress Chieko Baisho at the "38th Japan Singers Association Song Festival" held at Yu-Port in Gotanda, Tokyo. On November 26, she held a mini concert at Takaodai Junior High School in Kanazawa City, Ishikawa Prefecture, at the 30th Anniversary Ceremony Lecture.

== Works ==
Inoue has performed a large number of radio dramas themes, anime theme songs, and anime insert songs, including the following:

- Carrying You (君をのせて, Kimi o Nosete) (1986, Laputa: Castle in the Sky)
- My Neighbor Totoro (となりのトトロ, Tonari no Totoro) (1988, My Neighbor Totoro)
- Stroll (さんぽ, Sanpo) (1988, My Neighbor Totoro)
- Lost Child (迷子, Maigo) (1988, My Neighbor Totoro)
- Changing Seasons (めぐる季節, Meguru Kisetsu) (1989, Kiki's Delivery Service)
- I Can't Allow the Loneliness (悲しみが許せない, Kanashimi ga Yurusenai) (1989, Guyver: The Bioboosted Armor)
- Little Witch Lullaby (小さな魔女の子守歌, Chiisa na Majo no Komoriuta) (1992–1993, Yadamon)
- Let's Fly Yadamon (レッツ・フライ・ヤダモン, Rettsu Furai Yadamon) (1992–1993, Yadamon)
- The Earth in My Sight (瞳の中の地球, Hitomi no Naka no Chikyū) (1992–1993, Yadamon)
- Swirling Sakura Dance (桜、舞う, Sakura, Mau) (February–March 1992, Minna no Uta)
- Let's Go Searching!! (さがしにゆこうよ!!, Sagashi ni Yukō yo!!) (Suki Suki Kisugon)
- The Color of Wind within My Hands (てのひらに風の色, Te no Hira ni Kaze no Iro) (image song for TV Kanazawa)
- Song of Happiness: Strolling with the Wind (しあわせのうた ～風とおさんぽ～, Shiawase no Uta: Kaze to Osanpo) (August–September 2006, Minna no Uta)
- The Seed Of Light (ヒカリの種, Hikari no Tane) (2009, Hello, Anne: Before Green Gables)
- Alright March (やったね ♪ マーチ, Yattane March) (2009, Hello, Anne: Before Green Gables)

== Discography ==
=== Singles ===
Believe (ビリーヴ, Birīvu) / Message
2006-02-15, OWCR-1012, CD single, ¥1000, Rock Chipper Records, Japan
Lyrics by Ryūichi Sugimoto
Composed by Ryūichi Sugimoto
Believe is a cover.
Mie Television "Hello! M & Smile (三重テレビ「ハロー！エムっとスマイル」, Mie Terebi "Harō! Emutto Sumairu)
2008-05-21, KDSD-00207, CD single, ¥1050, Team Entertainment, Japan

=== Albums ===
Beyond the Beyond Image Vocal Tracks (その向こうの向こう側 イメージボーカルトラックス, Sono Mukō no Mukōgawa Imēji Bōkaru Torakkusu)
2005-11-16, KDSD-00082, CD, ¥2100, Team Entertainment, Japan
This is an image album with songs from the drama CD release based on the Beyond the Beyond manga by Yoshitomo Watanabe.
Song of Happiness: Strolling with the Wind (しあわせのうた ～風とおさんぽ～, Shiawase no Uta: Kaze to Osanpo)
2006-09-06, OWCR-2029, CD with DVD, ¥1500, Rock Chipper Records, Japan
Includes a bonus DVD with the Minna no Uta animation which goes with the title song.
Harmony
2008-07-23, KDSD-00225, CD, ¥1600, Team Entertainment, Japan

=== Compilations ===
Inoue performed one or more songs on these albums. The songs performed are indicated below the album entry.

Animation the Movie (アニメ・ザ・ムービー, Anime za Mūbī)
1988-06-25, 32ATC-167, CD, ¥2920, Tokuma Japan Communications, Japan
Inoue performs tracks 7–11.
Animage Best Collection (アニメ−ジュ・ベスト・コレクション, Animēju Besuto Korekushon)
1990-07-25, TKCA-30147, CD, ¥2427, Tokuma Japan Communications, Japan
Inoue performs tracks 2–3, 8, 10–11, and 13.
Animage Vocal Collection (アニメージュ・ヴォーカル・コレクション, Animēju Vōkaru Korekushon)
1990-09-25, TKCA-30147, CD, ¥2233, Tokuma Japan Communications, Japan
Inoue performs tracks 1, 3–5, 9, and 14.
Perfect of Animage (パ−フェクト・オブ・アニメ−ジュ, Pāfekuto obu Animēju)
1991-01-25, TKCA-30209, CD, ¥2427, Tokuma Japan Communications, Japan
Inoue performs tracks 8–10.
Animage Single (アニメージュ・シングルズ, Animēju Shinguruzu)
1991-12-21, TKCA-30488, CD, ¥1748, Tokuma Japan Communications, Japan
Inoue performs tracks 3, 5, 7, and 8.
Animage Complete Collection (アニメージュ・コンプリート・コレクション, Animēju Konpurīto Korekushon)
1992-11-25, TKCA-30706, CD, ¥2233, Tokuma Japan Communications, Japan
Inoue performs tracks 4, 9, 11, 13, and 16.
Studio Ghibli Songs (スタジオ・ジブリ ソングス, Sutajio Jiburi Songusu)
1998-05-21, TKCA-71381, CD, ¥2913, Tokuma Japan Communications, Japan
Inoue performs tracks 2–4.
Atelier Series Vocal Collection "Volkslied." (アトリエシリーズ・ボーカルコレクション「フォルクスリート～Volkslied.」, Atorie Shirīzu Bōkaru Korekushon "Forukusurīto.")
2005-04-20, KDSD-00067, CD, ¥2100, Team Entertainment, Japan
This is an album based on the Atelier series of video games from Gust. It contains theme songs from several of the games.
Vocal artists include Inoue, Miki Takahashi, Haruka Shimotsuki, Fukiko Ōta, Jun Kageie, and Taku Kitahara.

== Voice roles ==
- Tengai Makyō II: Manjimaru (1992-03-26, Kinu)
- Tengai Makyō: Fūun Kabukiden (1993-07-10, Kinu)
- Tengai Makyō: Dennō Karakuri Kakutōden (1995-07-28, Kinu)
- Tengai Makyō: Shinden (1995-07-28, Kinu)
