= Sound Horizon =

Japanese musical group

- Origin: Tokyo, Japan
- Genres: Sound Horizon: Symphonic rock; art rock; Linked Horizon: Symphonic metal
- Years active: 2001–present
- Labels: Bellwood Records (2004–2006); King Records (2006–2011); Pony Canyon (October 1, 2011–present)
- Members: Revo
- Past members: See Sound Horizon band members
- Website: soundhorizon.com

Sound Horizon is a Japanese symphonic rock musical group with composer Revo (Japanese pronunciation: [ɾebo]) as the leader and only permanent member. They describe themselves as a "fantasy band" and have released works that closely resemble classical suites. Their songs often revolve around historical events and classic fairytales. When creating music based on other people's stories, the band uses the name Linked Horizon.

== History ==
Logo of Sound Horizon

Sound Horizon began with Revo releasing his music creations on the internet on his website in the late 1990s. In 2001, Sound Horizon participated in Comic Market as part of a dōjin music circle and released their first story CD, Chronicle, an all-instrumental track CD, with occasional narration, background chorus and sound effects. The inclusion of actual singing began from their second release (Thanatos) onwards. Their subsequent works were released at Comic Market and M3.

Sound Horizon's first major release was in 2004, with the album Elysion ~Rakuen e no Zensōkyoku~ (lit. Elysion ~Prelude to Paradise~). Their first maxi-single, "Shōnen wa Tsurugi o...", which was released in 2006, includes "Shūtan no Ou to Isekai no Kishi ~The Endia & The Knights~", the theme for the PlayStation 2 simulation RPG Chaos Wars, and "Kamigami ga Aishita Rakuen ~Belle Isle~", the opening theme for the MMORPG Belle Isle.

Although Aramary was their main female singer through the Elysion album, her departure afterward led Sound Horizon's style to shift quite a bit, to having many vocalists, rather than just one main female one (previously Aramary) and one main male vocalist (Jimang). Revo himself also tended to sing more often in the later albums, beginning with Roman.

On September 3, 2008, Sound Horizon released the album Moira. The album featured Takashi Utsunomiya of TM Network as one of the vocalists. Moira debuted at No. 3 on the Oricon weekly album charts, selling over 45,000 copies in its initial week.

Sound Horizon released the single "Ido e Itaru Mori e Itaru Ido" on June 16, 2010. The single featured guitarist Marty Friedman and Vocaloid Hatsune Miku, along with a beta voicebank for Vocaloid known as "Junger März PROTOTYPE β".

In 2012, Revo began a new project called Linked Horizon, beginning with his work on the score for the Nintendo 3DS game Bravely Default: Flying Fairy, a series of EPs and album. In 2013 and subsequent years, Linked Horizon performed the first, second, third, fifth and eighth opening themes, as well as the fourth and series finale ending themes, for the anime adaptation of Attack on Titan along with a series of EPs and albums.

In June 2014, Revo also composed the first opening theme of Sailor Moon Crystal, "Moon Pride".

In September 2020, as part of their major debut's 15th anniversary projects, Sound Horizon announced a Blu-ray story album, Ema ni Negai wo!, which would allow listeners to make choices and experience the story differently depending on those choices. The "Prologue Edition" was released on January 13, 2021, and the "Full Edition" was originally scheduled for release on March 15, 2023, but was delayed to June 14 of the same year.

== Discography ==
Sound Horizon's main albums are called 'Stories' or 'Horizons' and are numbered, starting with Chronicle.

Pico Magic, Pico Magic Reloaded, Elysion ~Rakuen e no Zensōkyoku~ and Chronology are compilation albums and are not counted as story albums.

Chronicle 2nd is an expanded reissue of the first Chronicle album.

The ninth story Nein was released in 2015, even though the eighth story, with the working title Rinne, hasn't been released yet.

=== Doujin albums ===
Title	Album details
1st Story Chronicle	Released: December 30, 2001; Label: Self-released; Format: CD
2nd Story Thanatos	Released: August 11, 2002; Label: Self-released; Format: CD
3rd Story Lost	Released: December 30, 2002; Label: Self-released; Format: CD
Pico Magic	Released: May 4, 2003; Label: Self-released; Format: CD
Pico Magic Reloaded	Released: August 17, 2003; Label: Self-released; Format: CD
1st Story Chronicle 2nd	Released: March 19, 2004; Label: Self-released; Format: CD

=== Sound Horizon major releases ===
==== Albums ====
Title	Album details	Peak position	Sales	Certifications
Title	Album details	JPN	Sales	Certifications
Elysion ~Rakuen e no Zensōkyoku~ Elysion ～楽園への前奏曲～ (Elysion ~Prelude to Paradise~)	Released: October 27, 2004; Re:Master Production released: July 29, 2020; Label: Bellwood Records; Formats: CD, digital download	—	—N/a	
4th Story Elysion ~Rakuen Gensō Monogatari Kumikyoku~ Elysion ～楽園幻想物語組曲～ (Elysion ~Paradise Fantasy Story Suite~)	Released: April 13, 2005; Re:Master Production released: July 29, 2020; Label: Bellwood Records; Formats: CD, digital download	29	—N/a	
5th Story Roman	Released: November 22, 2006; Re:Master Production released: August 26, 2020; Label: King Records; Formats: CD, digital download	19	—N/a	
6th Story Moira	Released: September 3, 2008; Re:Master Production released: September 30, 2020; Label: King Records; Formats: CD, digital download	3	JPN: 45,000+	
7th Story Märchen	Released: December 15, 2010; Re:Master Production released: October 21, 2020; Label: King Records; Formats: CD, digital download	2	JPN: 100,000+	RIAJ: Gold
Chronology [2005–2010]	Released: April 13, 2012; Label: King Records; Formats: CD	4	JPN: 22,435+	
9th Story Nein	Released: April 22, 2015; Re:Master Production released: November 25, 2020; Label: Pony Canyon; Formats: CD, digital download	2	JPN: 59,669+	
7.5th or 8.5th Story Ema ni Negai wo! (Prologue Edition) (絵馬に願ひを! (Prologue Edition) "Wish on the Ema")	Released: January 13, 2021; App release: October 17, 2022; Label: Pony Canyon; Formats: Blu-ray, digital download, iOS, Android	1 (Blu-ray chart)	JPN: 19,469+	
7.5th or 8.5th Story Ema ni Negai wo! (Full Edition) (絵馬に願ひを! (Full Edition) "Wish on the Ema")	Released: June 14, 2023; Label: Pony Canyon; Formats: Blu-ray	5 (Blu-ray chart)	JPN: 11,532+	
"—" denotes a recording that did not chart or was not released in that territory.

==== Singles ====
Title	Details	Peak position	Sales	Album
Title	Details	JPN	Sales	Album
"Shōnen wa Tsurugi o..." (少年は剣を... "A Boy's Sword Is...")	Released: October 4, 2006; Re:Master Production released: August 26, 2020; Label: King Records; Formats: CD, digital download	9	—N/a	Non-album single
"Seisen no Iberia" (聖戦のイベリア "Holy War of Iberia")	Released: August 1, 2007; Re:Master Production released: September 30, 2020; Label: King Records; Formats: CD, digital download	8	—N/a	Non-album single
"Ido e Itaru Mori e Itaru Ido" (イドへ至る森へ至るイド "The Id That Leads to the Forest Leading to the Id")	Released: June 16, 2010; Re:Master Production released: October 21, 2020; Label: King Records; Formats: CD, digital download	2	JPN: 64,308+	Prologue to Märchen
"Halloween to Yoru no Monogatari" (ハロウィンと夜の物語 "The Story of Halloween and The Night")	Released: October 19, 2013; Re:Master Production released: October 30, 2020; Label: Pony Canyon; Formats: CD, digital download	3	JPN: 65,827+	Non-album single
"Vanishing Starlight" (ヴァニシング・スターライト)	Released: October 1, 2014; Re:Master Production released: November 25, 2020; Label: Pony Canyon; Formats: CD, digital download	3	JPN: 47,516+	Prologue to Nein
"Halloween to Asa no Monogatari" (ハロウィンと朝の物語 "The Story of Halloween and The Morning")	Released: November 13, 2024 (digital download, streaming), March 5, 2025 (CD); Label: Pony Canyon; Formats: digital download, CD	DL: 4 CD: 9	JPN: DL: 2,051+; CD: 12,741+	Non-album single

==== Live recordings ====
Story Concerts are a type of theatre concerts, that each reproduce a Story Album on stage, with the singers all in costumes and acting their roles in addition to singing.

(This list does not include live recordings released as extra content with albums)

Title	Details
4th Story Elysion ~ Welcome to the Paradise Parade ~ Elysion～楽園パレードへようこそ～ (Elysion - Rakuen Parade e Youkoso)	Released: March 8, 2006; Label: Bellwood Records; Format: DVD
5th Story Roman ~ The Stories that Connect Us ~ Roman～僕達が繋がる物語～ (Roman ~Bokutachi Ga Tsunagaru Monogatari~)	Released: April 25, 2006; Label: King Records; Format: DVD
Triumph of the Second Territorial Expansion ［Triumph］～第二次領土拡大遠征の軌跡～ (Triumph ~Daini ji Ryoudo Kakudai Ensei no Kiseki ~)	Released: February 8, 2008; Label: RAP PRODUCTS; Format: Photobook with a live DVD included
6th Story Moira 『Moira』～其れでも、お征きなさい仔等よ (Moira ~Soredemo Oyukinasai Korayo~)	Released: March 25, 2009; Label: King Records; Format: DVD
Triumph of the Third Territorial Expansion 第三次領土拡大遠征凱旋記念『国王生誕祭』 (Daisan ji Ryoudo Kakudai Ensei Kaeson Kinen "Kokuou Seitan Matsuri")	Released: December 9, 2009; Label: King Records; Format: Blu-ray, DVD
Across the Horizon - 5th Anniversary Movie	Released: March 24, 2010; Label: King Records; Format: Blu-ray, DVD
7th Story Märchen ~That Brightly Shining Era in Which You’re Smiling Even Now~ 『Märchen』 ～キミが今笑っている、眩いその時代に･･･～ (Märchen ~Kimi ga Ima Waratsu te Iru、Mabui sono Jidai ni...~)	Released: July 27, 2011; Label: King records; Format: Blu-ray, DVD
The Assorted Horizons - Treasured Blu-ray & DVD メジャーデビュー10周年記念作品 第1弾 (Mejā Debyū 10 Shūnenkinen Sakuhin Dai 1-dan)	Released: June 18, 2014; Label: Pony Canyon; Format: Blu-ray, DVD
9th Story Nein ~Welcome to the Western Antique Attic Shop 『Nein』〜西洋骨董屋根裏堂へようこそ〜 メジャーデビュー10周年記念作品 第1弾 (Nein ~Seiyou Kottou Yaneura Dou e Youkoso~ - Mejā Debyū 10 Shūnenkinen Sakuhin Dai 4-dan)	Released: January 20, 2016; Label: Pony Canyon; Format: Blu-ray, DVD
Revo's Halloween Party 2024	Released: October 31, 2025; Label: Pony Canyon; Format: Blu-ray

=== Linked Horizon ===
==== Albums ====
Title	Details	Peak position	Sales
Title	Details	JPN	Sales
Luxendarc Daikikō ルクセンダルク大紀行 (Large Diary of Luxendarc)	Released: September 19, 2012; Label: Pony Canyon; Formats: CD, digital download	15	—N/a
Shingeki no Kiseki 進撃の軌跡 (Trajectory of the Attack)	Released: May 17, 2017; Label: Pony Canyon; Formats: CD, digital download	2	JPN: 33,215+
Shingeki no Kioku Best Album 進撃の記憶 (Memory of the Attack)	Released: August 7, 2024; Label: Pony Canyon; Formats: CD	5	JPN: 10,818+

==== Singles ====
Title	Details	Peak position	Sales	Certifications	Album
Title	Details	JPN	Sales	Certifications	Album
"Luxendarc Shōkikō" ルクセンダルク小紀行 (Small Diary of Luxendarc)	Released: August 22, 2012; Label: Pony Canyon; Formats: CD, digital download	8	JPN: 20,454+		Luxendarc Daikikō
"Jiyū e no Shingeki" (自由への進撃 "March to Freedom")	Released: July 10, 2013; Label: Pony Canyon; Formats: CD, digital download	2	JPN: 250,000+	RIAJ: Platinum	Shingeki no Kiseki
"Seishun wa Hanabi no Yō ni" (青春は花火のように "Youth is Like Fireworks")	Released: October 5, 2015; Label: Pony Canyon; Formats: Digital download	—	N/A		
"Rakuen e no Shingeki" (楽園への進撃 "Attack on Paradise")	Released: September 19, 2018; Label: Pony Canyon; Formats: CD, digital download	5	JPN: 14,414		TBA
"Shinjitsu e no Shingeki" (真実への進撃 "Attack on the Truth")	Released: June 19, 2019; Label: Pony Canyon; Formats: CD, digital download	8	JPN: 12,915		TBA
"Nisennen... Moshiku wa... Nimannen Go no Kimi e" (二千年... 若しくは... 二万年後の君へ・・ "To You 2,000... or... 20,000 Years From Now...")	Released: November 5, 2023; Label: Pony Canyon; Formats: digital download	TBA	JPN:		Shingeki no Kioku
"Saigo no Kyojin" (最後の巨人 "The Last Titan")	Released: November 6, 2023; Label: Pony Canyon; Formats: digital download	TBA	JPN:		Shingeki no Kioku
"—" denotes a recording that did not chart or was not released in that territory.

==== Live recordings ====
Title	Details
A Travelogue of Luxendarc ルクセンダルク紀行 (Rukusendaruku Kikou)	Recording of the Revo Linked BRAVELY DEFAULT Concert; Released: March 20, 2013; Label: Pony Canyon; Format: Blu-ray, DVD
The Trails of the Advance 『進撃の軌跡』総員集結 凱旋公演 ("Shingeki no Kiseki" Souin Shuuketsu Gaien Kouen)	Recording from Linked Horizon's Shingeki no Kiseki tour; Released: December 26, 2018; Label: Pony Canyon; Format: Blu-ray, DVD

=== Revo ===
Title	Details	Peak position
Title	Details	JPN
Leviathan リヴァイアサン/終末を告げし獣 (Leviathan/The Beast That Foretells the End) image album	Released: March 2, 2005; Label: King Records; Formats: CD	-
Poca Felicità Gunslinger Girl image album	Released: December 21, 2005; Label: Marvelous Entertainment; Formats: CD	-
森雄介 (Yusuke Mori) ...for rest	Released: May 17, 2006; Label: Bellwood Records; Formats: CD	-
霜月はるか†Revo Schwarzweiß 霧の向こうに繋がる世界 (Worlds Connected Beyond the Mist)	Released: June 14, 2006; Label: TEAM Entertainment; Formats: CD	-
Revo＆梶浦由記 Collaborate Maxi Single Dream Port	Released: June 18, 2008; Label: King Records; Formats: CD	-
Bravely Default Original Soundtrack (ブレイブリーデフォルト フライングフェアリー オリジナル・サウンドトラック Bureiburī Deforuto Furaingu Fearī Orijinaru Saundotorakku)	Released: October 10, 2012; Label: Square Enix; Formats: CD, digital download	21
Moon Pride Sailor Moon Crystal opening theme	Released: July 30, 2014; Label: Evil Line Records; Formats: CD, digital download	3
Bravely Default II Original Soundtrack	Released: March 3, 2021; Label: Pony Canyon; Formats: CD, digital download	12 5819+ sold
白上フブキ (Fubuki Shirakami) Our Constellation 僕らの星座	Released: November 5, 2024; Label: Hololive Production; Formats: Digital download, CD (on Fubuki Shirakami's album Blessing)	DL: 24 1,197+ sold
"—" denotes a recording that did not chart or was not released in that territory.

== Awards and nominations ==
Year	Award	Category	Work/Nominee	Result
2013	Newtype Anime Awards	Best Theme Song	"Guren no Yumiya" (from anime Attack on Titan)	Won
2013	Animation Kobe Awards	Theme Song Award	"Guren no Yumiya" (from anime Attack on Titan)	Won
2013	Billboard Japan Music Awards	Animation Artist of the Year	Linked Horizon	Won
2017	Newtype Anime Awards	Best Theme Song	"Shinzō wo Sasageyo!" (from anime's second season Attack on Titan)	8th place
2018	2nd Crunchyroll Anime Awards	Best Opening	"Shinzō wo Sasageyo!" (from anime's second season Attack on Titan)	Nominated
2019	3rd Crunchyroll Anime Awards	Best Ending Sequence	"Akatsuki no Requiem" (from anime's third season Attack on Titan)	Won
